= Mashima Hero's =

Japanese manga series by Hiro Mashima

- Tankōbon volume cover, featuring (clockwise from top) Shiki Granbell, Natsu Dragneel, and Haru Glory
- Genre: Adventure, fantasy
- Manga
- Written by: Hiro Mashima
- Published by: Kodansha
- English publisher: NA: Kodansha USA
- Imprint: Shōnen Magazine Comics
- Magazine: Weekly Shōnen Magazine
- Original run: October 16, 2019 – December 25, 2019
- Volumes: 1

Mashima Hero's (stylized as Mashima HERO'S and formerly known as Hero's) is a Japanese manga series written and illustrated by Hiro Mashima. The series is a crossover between three of Mashima's previous works, Rave Master, Fairy Tail, and Edens Zero, drawn to mark the 60th anniversary of Weekly Shōnen Magazine.

== Plot ==
Natsu Dragneel visits True Island for a tropical vacation with his team from the wizard guild Fairy Tail. During an exploration, Natsu befriends Shiki Granbell and his crew from the spaceship Edens Zero, who are there searching for their crewmate Homura Kôgetsu following her detainment for pursuing a rumored location called Oasis. Meanwhile, Rave Master Haru Glory and his companions arrive on the island to destroy Oasis, which they identify as a Dark Bring—a corruptive, power-granting stone—that turns its user's imagination into reality. Haru discovers that Oasis's holder, Mashymre, has been using it to entertain the island's inhabitants, and persuades him to relinquish the stone. However, Mashymre is betrayed by his power-hungry disciple Shinra, who uses Oasis's power to reinvent himself as a god of creativity named Genesis.

Natsu and Shiki meet Haru and his partner Plue while their groups battle an army of monsters conjured by Genesis, who intends to take over the world. Genesis targets Haru and Plue for their power to destroy his Dark Bring, but dismisses them and retreats to his tower of Altairis after the three heroes fail to defeat him. The trio separate following an argument over their conflicting interests, but later reunite as Shiki's crewmate Weisz Steiner gathers Homura and the rest of the trio's companions with a navigation system of his invention, dubbed "HEROS". Shiki's off-world crewmates inform the group that Genesis's stone is a conduit for the real Oasis, which they surmise is located somewhere else on True Island. Overcoming their differences, the trio distract Genesis in a rematch atop Altairis while their companions search for Oasis amidst the growing monster army.

Reaching True Island's central cave, Elie, Lucy Heartfilia, and Rebecca Bluegarden encounter Mashymre, who reveals himself as a creator god who authored the three groups' existence as part of separate manga. Mashymre explains that the island itself is the true form of Oasis, which he had created along with Genesis and the other islanders after losing control of his powers. Elie pierces the island's center with Plue's nose horn before she, Lucy, and Rebecca channel their powers into him, which nullifies Oasis's power and allows Haru, Natsu, and Shiki to defeat Genesis. Oasis's destruction causes True Island to fade from existence, while Mashymre returns the groups to their respective worlds, though he deliberately sends the Butt Jiggle Gang, Ichiya Vandalay Kotobuki, and Mosco Versa-0 to the wrong worlds as a prank.

== Publication ==
The crossover series is written and illustrated by Hiro Mashima, who was approached by the staff of Weekly Shōnen Magazine to write a story commemorating the 60th anniversary of the magazine's publication. The manga was serialized in Weekly Shōnen Magazine from October 16 to December 25, 2019. The chapters were published in a single tankōbon volume, which was released on April 17, 2020. In the same month, the series was renamed from Hero's to Mashima Hero's so the series could rank higher in search engine results.

In March 2020, Kodansha USA announced they licensed the series for English publication. They released the volume on December 1, 2020.

No.	Original release date	Original ISBN	English release date	English ISBN
1	April 17, 2020	978-4-06-518523-0	December 1, 2020	978-1-64-651178-5
1. "Hero's"; 2. "Island"; 3. "Rebel" (Note: The title is written with furikanji reading 反逆者, meaning "traitor".); 4. "Oasis"; 5. "Mix"; 6. "Attack"; 7. "Session"; 8. "Heroine's"; 9. "Illusion"; 10. "Mate" (Note: The title is written with furikanji reading 仲間, meaning "companion".)

== Reception ==
Demelza from Anime UK News praised the series, calling it "entertaining" and suggesting that fans of Mashima's work would enjoy it. Erkael from Manga News also offered it praise as they felt that reading it was a fun experience. Christel Scheja of Splash Comics wrote positively about the series, while also stating it can be hard to understand for someone who hasn't read any of the works featured. Faustine Lillaz from Planete BD had similar feelings about the series, stating that while it is not a masterpiece, it had good artwork and a solid story.
