= Fairy Tail the Movie: Phoenix Priestess =

- Theatrical release poster
- Directed by: Masaya Fujimori
- Screenplay by: Masashi Sogo
- Based on: Fairy Tail by Hiro Mashima
- Produced by: Hideharu Gomi; Ryōichi Ishihara; Yōsuke Imai; Hiroshi Tsutsumi; Shinsuke Nomura; Hidemasa Tasaka
- Starring: Tetsuya Kakihara; Aya Hirano; Rie Kugimiya; Yuichi Nakamura; Sayaka Ōhara; Satomi Satō; Yui Horie; Aya Endō; Mika Kanai
- Cinematography: Yosuke Akimoto
- Edited by: Akinori Mishima
- Music by: Yasuharu Takanashi
- Production company: A-1 Pictures
- Distributed by: Shochiku
- Release date: August 18, 2012
- Running time: 86 minutes
- Country: Japan
- Language: Japanese
- Box office: $911,467

Fairy Tail the Movie: Phoenix Priestess (Japanese: 劇場版 FAIRY TAIL 鳳凰の巫女, Hepburn: Gekijō-ban Fearī Teiru: Hōō no Miko; lit. 'Theatrical Feature Fairy Tail the Movie: Phoenix Priestess') is a 2012 Japanese animated fantasy action comedy film and the first based on the manga series Fairy Tail by Hiro Mashima. It was directed by Masaya Fujimori, and its screenplay was written by anime staff writer Masashi Sogo, while Mashima was involved as the film's story planner.

Tetsuya Kakihara, Aya Hirano, Rie Kugimiya, Yuichi Nakamura, Sayaka Ōhara, Satomi Satō, and Yui Horie reprise their character roles from the anime series. The film also features Aya Endō as the titular priestess Éclair, and Mika Kanai as her birdlike companion Momon. The first film was released in Japan on August 18, 2012, and on Blu-ray and DVD in North America on December 10, 2013.

A first sequel, titled Fairy Tail: Dragon Cry, was released on May 6, 2017.

== Plot ==
Natsu Dragneel and his team from the Fairy Tail guild are dispatched to the port town of Negura so they can capture Geese and his bandits. Despite defeating the bandits, the team is unable to stop Geese's escape. As they return to Magnolia, Lucy Heartfilia meets Éclair, an amnesiac Fire Village priestess who possesses one half of the village's mythical Phoenix Stone and distrusts magic, along with her birdlike companion Momon. Éclair lets Natsu's team join her on her quest to bring her half of the stone to the wizard Kalard in the monster-filled Boundary Forest. Meanwhile, Duke Cream, the vain ruler of the neighboring country of Veronica who is in possession of the stone's other half, orders Dist and his henchmen from the Carbuncle guild to bring Éclair to him.

Once in the forest, Natsu's team and Éclair discover a holographic message from the long-deceased Kalard, revealing himself as Éclair's father who developed a spell to neutralize the stone's cursed magic. Éclair bonds with Lucy over their fathers' deaths and entrusts Fairy Tail with completing Kalard's final request. Natsu's team returns to Magnolia just as Dist's team destroys the Fairy Tail guildhall and captures Éclair. Makarov Dreyar, Gajeel Redfox, and Panther Lily warn the guild about Cream's intent on combining the two halves of the stone to summon a phoenix, thus granting him immortality. Natsu leads his team, accompanied by Momon, Gajeel, Lily, and Juvia Lockser, to rescue Éclair in Veronica.

As the group of friends fight Dist's team, Cream combines the stone halves and prepares to sacrifice Éclair in the town square, where the priestess finally regains her memories upon recognizing a phoenix-shaped idol from her village. Momon rescues Éclair, but is killed. Cream summons the phoenix, which takes the form of a giant, non-avian monster. During the chaos, Dist pushes the duke aside so he can personally obtain the phoenix's immortality, but Natsu intervenes and the two engage in a duel. Eventually, the phoenix begins absorbing the wizards' magic for a final, cataclysmic attack on the country.

Lucy discovers that Éclair is over four centuries old, having become immortal by drinking the phoenix's blood to survive the destruction of her village, which later became Veronica. Makarov and the rest of Fairy Tail arrive with an arrow created by Kalard and taken from the Magic Council to destroy the Phoenix Stone. Knowing that the arrow will kill both Éclair and the phoenix, Natsu and Erza use it to destroy the stone inside the phoenix's eye. With the cursed magic neutralized, Éclair's body disappears with the phoenix, and her spirit reunites with Momon's as they ascend to the sky. In the aftermath, Veronica is rebuilt, Carbuncle's members are captured, the Fairy Tail wizards return to Magnolia and reconstruct their guildhall, and Lucy smiles as she spots a young Éclair's spirit among the townsfolk.

== Voice cast ==
Character	Japanese	English
Natsu Dragneel	Tetsuya Kakihara	Todd Haberkorn
Lucy Heartfilia	Aya Hirano	Cherami Leigh
Happy	Rie Kugimiya	Tia Ballard
Gray Fullbuster	Yuichi Nakamura	Newton Pittman
Erza Scarlet	Sayaka Ōhara	Colleen Clinkenbeard
Wendy Marvell	Satomi Satō	Brittney Karbowski
Carla	Yui Horie	Jad Saxton
Gajeel Redfox	Wataru Hatano	David Wald
Panther Lily	Hiroki Tōchi	Rick Keeling
Juvia Lockser	Mai Nakahara	Brina Palencia
Éclair (エクレア, Ekurea)	Aya Endō	Jessica Calvello
Momon (モモン)	Mika Kanai	Tiffany Grant
Duke Cream (クリーム王子, Kurīmu-ōji)	Kōki Miyata	Scott Zenreich
Dist (ディスト, Disuto)	Showtaro Morikubo	Taliesin Jaffe
Cannon (キャノン, Kyanon)	Kōji Ishii	Kyle Hebert
Coordinator (コーディネーター, Kōdinētā)	Hitomi Nabatame	Shelley Calene-Black
Chase (チェイス, Cheisu)	Kōji Yusa	Jason Liebrecht
Mayor Dasuma (ダスマ町長, Dasuma-chōchō)	Hidehiko Masuda	Ian Ferguson
Geese (ギース, Gīsu)	Keisuke Okada	David Matranga

== Music ==
The film's soundtrack was composed and arranged by Yasuharu Takanashi. It was released on August 18, 2012, on Pony Canyon. The film's opening theme is "200 miles" by Jang Keun-suk. The ending theme is "Zutto Kitto" (ずっと きっと; lit. 'Surely Forever'), an image song performed by Aya Hirano as Lucy Heartfilia, composed by Nobuo Uematsu, and written by Gorō Matsui.

== Release ==
The film received a limited release in 73 Japanese theaters on August 18, 2012. Advance tickets were bundled with the 30-page short manga Prologue: The Sunrise (はじまりの朝, Hajimari no Asa; lit. 'The First Morning') drawn by Hiro Mashima to promote the film. It opened in 9th place at the Japanese box office, and received the highest per-screen average of any film shown that weekend. It held a top ten position until its second week. The film's DVD was bundled with a special edition release of Volume 36 of the manga on February 13, 2013, and included an animated adaptation of The Sunrise as a bonus extra. In Southeast Asia, the film was aired on Animax Asia on March 23, 2013, as The Phoenix Priestess. Funimation Entertainment licensed the film for a North American release in both English subtitled and dubbed versions, with The Sunrise (retitled The First Morning) exclusively in Japanese with English subtitles. The movie dub was screened at Nan Desu Kan on September 13, 2013, and was released on Blu-ray and DVD on December 10, 2013.

== Reception ==
Fairy Tail the Movie: Phoenix Priestess received positive reviews from critics and viewers, receiving an average of "4 out of 5 stars" from fans on Japan Yahoo! Movies. Travis Bruno of Capsule Computers gave the film a score of 8.5 out of 10, praising the development of the characters Lucy and Éclair, and favoring the film's faster-paced action sequences over the anime series' use of CGI magic circles. However, he criticized the animation for having "nosedives in mid-distance shots". Bruno was also critical towards the timing of the film's North American release with that of the anime, feeling that the movie's placement after the time skip in Fairy Tail's storyline would confuse viewers who only followed the English release of the anime up until then.

Kyle Mills of DVD Talk described the movie as "a great one off story that is well developed and fantastically executed", distinguishing it from "typical" shōnen films with "little real development". He also praised the English dub cast, singling out Jessica Calvello and Todd Haberkorn as giving "standout" performances as Éclair and Natsu, respectively. Mills felt that the character designs looked "off" compared to the anime series, but added that it "shouldn't detract, since the film still looks better than your standard episode from the series". On the DVD's bonus features, Mills noted the lack of an English dub for The First Morning short, calling it "an odd choice". Raymond Herrera of Examiner.com called the film "more of the same", but opined that he found little else wrong with it.

Carl Kimlinger of Anime News Network called the film "a compact, 85-minute action confection with all the heart and humor one associates with Hiro Mashima's manga and none of the bloat and apathy one associates with its TV adaptation". However, he considered the English dub to be "stoically, unenthusiastically professional", criticizing Cherami Leigh and Calvello's performances, but calling Haberkorn's "toned-down" Natsu "a relief".
