= Fairy Tail: Dragon Cry =

- Theatrical release poster
- Directed by: Tatsuma Minamikawa
- Screenplay by: Shōji Yonemura
- Based on: Fairy Tail by Hiro Mashima
- Produced by: Norio Yamakawa; Tetsuya Endō; Yōhei Itō; Noritoshi Satō; Yang Xinrui; Kazuo Ōnuki; Yūya Yoshida
- Starring: Tetsuya Kakihara; Aya Hirano; Rie Kugimiya; Yuichi Nakamura; Sayaka Ōhara; Satomi Satō; Yui Horie; Makoto Furukawa; Aoi Yūki; Jiro Saito; Chiaki Takahashi; Ryōta Takeuchi; Taku Yashiro
- Cinematography: Yoshiaki Kimura
- Music by: Yasuharu Takanashi
- Production company: A-1 Pictures
- Distributed by: Gaga
- Release date: May 6, 2017
- Running time: 85 minutes
- Country: Japan
- Language: Japanese
- Box office: $478,118 (Japan) $1.42 million (worldwide)

Fairy Tail: Dragon Cry (Japanese: 劇場版 FAIRY TAIL -DRAGON CRY-, Hepburn: Gekijō-ban Fearī Teiru: Doragon Kurai; lit. "Theatrical Feature Fairy Tail: Dragon Cry") is a 2017 Japanese animated fantasy action comedy film and the second based on the manga series Fairy Tail by Hiro Mashima. It is directed by Tatsuma Minamikawa based on a screenplay by Shōji Yonemura, both of whom worked on the anime series, and the film is the sequel to 2012's movie Fairy Tail the Movie: Phoenix Priestess. Mashima himself also created a storyboard for the second/sequel film and served as a chief producer.

Set between Fairy Tail's penultimate and final story arcs, Dragon Cry focuses on the members of the titular wizard guild infiltrating the Kingdom of Stella to recover a stolen staff of cataclysmic power. Tetsuya Kakihara, Aya Hirano, Rie Kugimiya, Yuichi Nakamura, Sayaka Ōhara, Satomi Satō, and Yui Horie all reprise their roles from the television series, with Makoto Furukawa, Aoi Yūki, and Jiro Saito co-starring as new characters designed by Mashima and Yūko Yamada. The second film was released in Japan on May 6, 2017. It received limited theatrical screenings worldwide, with Funimation releasing the second film in North American theaters in both Japanese and localized English-dubbed formats from August 14 through August 19, 2017.

== Plot ==
Following Fairy Tail's battle against Avatar, (Note: As depicted in Fairy Tail (2006)) Fiore's treacherous minister of state Zash Caine steals the Dragon Cry, a mystical staff discovered in the dragon graveyard beneath the capital city of Crocus. Fiore's royal family recruits Natsu Dragneel and his team to recover the staff, which is imbued with magical power capable of annihilating the kingdom. The wizards pursue Zash to Stella, whose ruler, King Animus, intends to use the staff for a ritual. Natsu inadvertently alerts Zash to their presence upon touching the staff, which eventually results in his team being captured by Zash and the kingdom's elite military unit, the Three Stars. The team flees Stella with the help of Sonya, Animus's aide and childhood friend. Despite Sonya noting that Animus's ritual could prevent Stella's destruction, Natsu warns her that the Dragon Cry contains the malicious intent of dragons killed by Acnologia.

Returning to Stella, Fairy Tail retrieves the staff and defeats the Three Stars in the process. Sonya touches the Dragon Cry, realizing Natsu's warning of its true nature, and refuses to give the staff to Animus. Natsu arrives and sees Sonya speaking to herself; possessing Sonya, Animus reveals himself to be a dragon who sealed himself within her body to cheat death, appearing to her in a human guise to deceive her. Unable to escape Sonya's body on his own, Animus performs the ritual to free himself using the staff's magic, but emerges in a weakened form after Zash steals the staff for himself, seeking revenge against Fiore for exiling him. Zash uses the staff to activate an army of artificial soldiers against Fairy Tail and tries destroying Fiore, but is killed by the staff's magic energy.

In a struggle over the staff, Animus impales Natsu on one of his spikes and finishes absorbing the staff's magic, regaining his full strength. Natsu survives his injury, with half of his body taking on the appearance of a dragon, and viciously attacks Animus; Animus recognizes Natsu as E.N.D., the "destroyer of all", before Natsu defeats him. Natsu is deeply shaken by his transformation upon returning to normal, but is comforted by Lucy Heartfilia. Sonya destroys the Dragon Cry, deactivating the soldiers and causing Animus to die peacefully. The broken staff reverts to its true form, a ribbon once belonging to Sonya, which flies away in the breeze.

Acnologia picks up the ribbon and remembers killing a group of dragons and mortally wounding Animus for attacking Sonya as a child, which led to Animus inhabiting Sonya's body; having lost his compassion for humanity, Acnologia destroys the ribbon. Zeref observes Acnologia from afar alongside Brandish μ and Invel Yura, declaring that his battle with Natsu is imminent.

== Voice cast ==
Character	Japanese	English
Natsu Dragneel	Tetsuya Kakihara	Todd Haberkorn
Lucy Heartfilia	Aya Hirano	Cherami Leigh
Happy	Rie Kugimiya	Tia Ballard
Gray Fullbuster	Yuichi Nakamura	Newton Pittman
Erza Scarlet	Sayaka Ohara	Colleen Clinkenbeard
Wendy Marvell	Satomi Satō	Brittney Karbowski
Carla	Yui Horie	Jad Saxton
Gajeel Redfox	Wataru Hatano	David Wald
Panther Lily	Hiroki Tochi	Rick Keeling
Makarov Dreyar	Shinpachi Tsuji	R. Bruce Rlliott
Juvia Lockser	Mai Nakahara	Brina Palencia
Levy McGarden	Mariya Ise	Kristi Kang
Hisui E. Fiore	Suzuko Mimori	Morgan Mabry
Animus (アニムス, Animusu)	Makoto Furukawa	Michael Sinterniklaas
Sonya (ソーニャ, Sōnya)	Aoi Yūki	Erica Mendez
Zash Caine (ザッシュ・ケイン, Zasshu Kein)	Jiro Saito	Ray Chase
Swan (スワン, Suwan)	Chiaki Takahashi	Cristina Vee
Doll (ドール, Dōru)	Ryōta Takeuchi	Bob Carter
Gapri (ガプリ, Gapuri)	Taku Yashiro	Nathan Sharp
Acnologia	Kōsuke Toriumi	J. Michael Tatum
Igneel	Hidekatsu Shibata	Jim White
Zeref	Akira Ishida	Joel McDonald

== Production ==
Production of a second/sequel Fairy Tail film was first announced in Kodansha's Weekly Shōnen Magazine in May 2015, with key and concept artwork illustrated by Hiro Mashima depicting the character Natsu Dragneel in a half-draconic form seen in the finished film. Mashima drew 193 pages of storyboards for the film, created rough sketches of its characters, and served as a chief producer. The Fairy Tail: Dragon Cry title was revealed on the first day of January 2017. The film's campaign promoted the climax of the Fairy Tail manga series, which concluded its run on July 26, 2017. The theme song for the film is "What You Are" by Polka Dots.

== Release ==
The second film was released in Japan on May 6, 2017, with an international release in select theaters scheduled the same month. Madman Entertainment announced plans to distribute the film theatrically in Australia and New Zealand. Anime Limited distributed and released the film on 17 May 2017 in the United Kingdom, with further screenings scheduled for 19 May 2017. The moviegoers who attend the movie screening had got a storyboard booklet by Hiro Mashima. Southeast Asian film distributor ODEX brought the film to Singapore on June 8, Indonesia, Malaysia on July 27, and the Philippines. German distributor KAZÉ Anime brought the film on June 27 and July 16, 2017, in cinemas in Germany and Austria. The film debuted and ranked #10 in the box office with 42,771 admissions. Anime Central later hosted the film premiere on May 20, 2017.

On July 14, 2017, Funimation announced limited theatrical screenings of the second film in North America. The second film was screened on August 14, 2017, in a subtitled-only format in the United States and Canada, and on August 16 and 19 in a dubbed format in the United States. Screenings for the dub were scheduled for August 17 in Canada.

The second film was released on DVD and Blu-Ray in Japan on November 17, 2017.

== Reception ==
Sarah Nelkin of Anime Now gave the film a positive review, calling it "a fun romp stuffed with all the elements Fairy Tail is known for that fans can enjoy, from visuals to music to characters". However, she did not recommend the film for newcomers to the franchise, and criticized the brevity of Natsu's character development, despite considering his struggle with his identity "a cool idea". Rebecca Silverman of Anime News Network gave the film an overall "B" rating, saying it "nicely builds up to the finale arc of the story" and praising its action, humor, and emotional effectiveness, while criticizing its underuse of characters such as Lucy, Sonya, Gajeel and Levy. Silverman also noted that the film's plot "absolutely assumes that you're familiar with the later events of the story", warning that it would result in fans being "either be mildly confused or very spoiled".
