= Farmagia =

2024 video game

- Developer: Marvelous
- Publishers: WW: Marvelous; NA: Marvelous USA
- Director: Hiromi Sakamoto
- Producers: Tsuyoshi Nagano; Toru Mase; Kenichiro Tsukuda
- Designer: Norikazu Miwa
- Programmer: Yoshiyuki Takahashi
- Artist: Hiro Mashima
- Writers: Hiromi Sakamoto; Makoto Sato
- Composers: Tetsuya Kobayashi; Shioto Hamasaki
- Engine: Unity
- Platforms: Nintendo Switch; PlayStation 5; Steam
- Release: WW: November 1, 2024
- Genres: Action role-playing, farm life sim
- Mode: Single-player

Farmagia (stylized in all caps) is a Japanese action role-playing video game developed and published by Marvelous, with character designs by manga artist Hiro Mashima. It was released worldwide for Nintendo Switch, PlayStation 5 and Steam on November 1, 2024. An anime television series adaptation produced by Bridge aired from January to March 2025.

== Gameplay ==

Top: Ten sows a seed that will grow into a "Fang" monster.
Bottom: Leii commands the party's monsters to attack an enemy.

Farmagia is a single-player action role-playing game and farm life sim in which the player grows monsters from seeds acquired from dungeons called mazes. On the player's farm, actions such as tilling and watering cost stamina called Farmagia Points (FP), which is replenished upon completing a maze. Fertilizers are purchased from the game's magic shop to improve monster growth and shorten the number of in-game days until harvest.

The player grows two types of monsters on the farm: Battle Buddies, which are used to battle enemies encountered in mazes; and Research Buddies, which award points used to purchase additional skills and benefits in farming and battle. Additionally, Agri-Buddies are crafted from the game's magic shop to perform farming actions without consuming FP or resources. Once harvested, Battle Buddies are trained on the player's ranch to boost their individual stats. The effectiveness of training depends on the monsters' motivation, which decreases with every stat increase, and is recovered by feeding the monsters with treats.

In mazes, the player controls a team of four characters with up to forty to sixty Battle Buddies divided among four different units: close-range attackers, long-range attackers, buffing and debuffing support units, and formation units focused on healing and protection. Each unit is assigned to a button that prompts them to attack a targeted enemy, decreasing their health and stamina. Besides attack and defense, Battle Buddies are used to perform various actions: Unite Blitzes, which combine one unit into a stronger United Buddy; Legion Attacks, during which all of the player's monsters attack a target simultaneously when its stamina is depleted; and Fusion Summons, which combine all units into a Fusion Buddy that damages all enemies on the battlefield. Player characters and monsters receive temporary benefits by equipping Fairy Skills, which are acquired from fairies found in fairy pods or purchased from the shopkeeper Charlot, and are reset after the player exits a maze.

The game's story is divided into twelve chapters, featuring 2D visual novel-style cutscenes. As the player progresses through the story, they form pacts with Elemental Spirits that unlock access to more Fusion Buddies. The game also features in an affection system in which the player upgrades their Fusion Buddies by deepening their relationships with each monster's corresponding Elemental Spirit.

== Plot ==
=== Setting and characters ===
Farmagia is set in Felicidad, a land in the underworld where its human-like denizens magically farm and grow monsters to use in battle and society, with these farmers known as Farmagia. Denizens live atop continent-sized monsters that serve as Felicidad's landmasses, with the town of Centvelt on the "continent" Avrion serving as the game's central hub. The continents are protected by the six Elemental Spirits, who strengthen any Farmagia with whom they form a pact.

The player characters are a party of young Farmagia orphans from Centvelt, consisting of Ten, their bold and reckless leader, and his childhood friends: Arche, a cheerful yet sickly girl; Leii, Ten's self-conscious best friend; Chica, Arche's pacifistic friend; Emero, Chica's older brother figure; and Anzar, the group's admired senior. A fairy named Lookie-Loo, who lacks conventional Fairy Skills, is also part of the group. They are guided by Nares, Avrion's altruistic ruling general, and Dentro, the orphanage's elderly caretaker.

The primary antagonists are Nares' fellow generals from the Oración Seis, who govern the other continents and oversee monster production on behalf of Felicidad's ruler, the Magus Diluculum. Its members are Glaza, a tyrannical archmage who rules the continent Nadeyat'sya; Manas, a mad scientist who rules Perfectus; Corpus, the brutish yet honorable ruler of Rahatluk; L'Oreille, the treacherous and sadistic ruler of Sonrisa; and Lisan, a bewitching newcomer to the group who rules no continent.

=== Story ===
Following Diluculum's death from old age, Glaza establishes an oppressive regime over Felicidad as its new Magus, while Nares leads Avrion in rebellion against him. Ten battles Glaza's legion when they invade Centvelt, but is defeated by their masked commander, Zanas. Nares rescues Ten and accepts him into Avrion's army alongside Leii, Arche, Chica, and Anzar, who help him drive Zanas' forces out of Avrion. Under Nares' command, Ten's party is tasked with freeing the other continents by securing their Elemental shrines and eliminating their Oración Seis generals, who have allied with Glaza. They also reunite with their missing friend Emero, now a soldier of Perfectus, who sides with Avrion after learning that Manas has been turning his subjects into mindless demi-beasts in experiments to produce the Farmagia Hyperion, the ultimate life form.

After killing Manas and Corpus, the party learns that Glaza has placed a deadly curse on Arche to blackmail her into deciphering Diluculum's grimoire, which is written in ancient Heavenly Scripts only she can read. Arche warns her friends that the grimoire contains knowledge of the Harvest Festival, a spell that reaps the souls of every denizen and monster on a continent. During the party's operation on Sonrisa, L'Oreille murders Lisan and betrays Glaza in an alliance with Zanas, leaving Glaza to be killed by the party, which lifts Arche's curse. In the process, Zanas is unmasked as Anzar, who has been working against Glaza and L'Oreille for his friends' protection. Despite Anzar securing the grimoire, L'Oreille reveals she has already learned the undeciphered spell and casts it on Nadeyat'sya, absorbing all its souls before being killed by the party.

In the aftermath, Diluculum reveals himself to have staged his own death and consumed the Oración Seis's souls to restore his youth. Abducting Nares and resurrecting the other generals, Diluculum transforms all but his knowing servant L'Oreille into demi-beasts and sends them to rampage across Felicidad. The party is forced to kill the generals while Diluculum prepares to reap all souls in Felicidad with the Grand Harvest Festival. Through clairvoyant dreams experienced by Arche, the party learns that the archangels Diluculum and Eleonora created Felicidad and its denizens alongside Dentro—their seraph friend—after a failed uprising against God, who would consume human souls to amass power; when God cursed Eleonora to rapidly age to death, Diluculum consumed her soul to preserve her vital connection to the Elemental Spirits, which also passed her curse onto him. Driven mad with grief, Diluculum intends to strengthen himself with Felicidad's souls to kill God, having created the Oración Seis and its candidates—including Ten and his friends—to advance his goal.

Diluculum successfully casts the Grand Harvest Festival after Dentro allows him to absorb his soul. Ten survives the spell by drawing strength from his friends, which awakens him as the Farmagia Hyperion; meanwhile, Diluculum's strength quickly deteriorates due to him consuming Dentro's soul, unaware that Dentro's old age was a slowed effect of God's curse. Ten revives his friends, and together they defeat Diluculum and restore Felicidad along with the souls lost in the Grand Harvest Festival. The party then become Felicidad's new leaders, the Dragons of Centvelt, returning the land to prosperity. Meanwhile, God's messenger Charlot—a cherub who had been controlling Lisan—chooses not to report Ten's awakening to God out of fondness for the party, sparing Felicidad from God's interference.

== Development and release ==
The game was announced at the Marvelous Game Showcase in May 2023 under the title Project Magia, with Hiro Mashima designing the characters and monsters. The current title was revealed at the following showcase in May 2024 along with the game's release year and opening sequence. The game's theme song is "dis-dystopia", an image song performed by Ayane Sakura and Inori Minase as the characters Arche and Chica, respectively.

Farmagia was released worldwide on November 1, 2024, published by Marvelous for the PlayStation 5, Nintendo Switch, and Steam, with Marvelous USA handling the game's release in North America. Following the game's launch, Marvelous released weekly "buddy skins" for in-game monsters as free downloadable content throughout November 2024.

== Reception ==
Reception

Aggregate scores
Aggregator	Score
Metacritic	NS: 64/100 (Note: Based on 7 reviews)
OpenCritic	33% recommend (Note: Based on 30 reviews)

Review scores
Publication	Score
Nintendo Life	7/10 stars
Nintendo World Report	6/10
RPGFan	75/100

The Nintendo Switch version of Farmagia launched at #8 on Japanese charts, selling 4,296 physical copies within its first three days of release, making it the only new release to chart in the top ten games sold that week.

The game received "mixed or average" reviews according to review aggregator Metacritic. Reviewing the Switch version, Paulo Kawanishi of Nintendo Life praised the character designs, writing, and technical performance. However, he criticized the farming aspect of the game, noting the lack of variety regarding the designs of its dungeons, monsters, and the farm itself. Leigh Price of Siliconera considered the game to be mediocre, calling its farming and training aspects "undercooked", but enjoyed the story and sidequests for their character writing. Abraham Kobylanski of RPGFan found the game's monster-farming premise to be bizarre, describing the story as both "strange but captivating" and "uneven", and praising the music and dating segments while criticizing the game's farming aspect as an "afterthought".

== Other media ==
- Farmagia
- Anime television series
- Directed by: Shinji Ishihira (chief); Toshihiko Sano
- Written by: Toshizō Nemoto
- Music by: Shūhei Mutsuki
- Studio: Bridge
- Licensed by: Crunchyroll (streaming); SA/SEA: Medialink
- Original network: Tokyo MX, MBS, BS11
- Original run: January 10, 2025 – March 28, 2025
- Episodes: 12
- icon

An anime adaptation was announced on June 20, 2024, and began development during the game's production. The television series is animated by Bridge and directed by Toshihiko Sano, with Shinji Ishihira serving as chief director, Toshizō Nemoto handling the series composition, Toshiomi Iizumi designing the characters, and Shūhei Mutsuki composing the music. The Japanese voice cast reprises their roles from the game. The anime's writing and direction is inspired by the style of Hiro Mashima, the game's character designer, including homages to Mashima's previous works Fairy Tail and Edens Zero.

It premiered on January 10, 2025, on Tokyo MX and other channels. The anime's opening theme is "Life is Beautiful" performed by Asian Kung-Fu Generation, while the ending theme is "miss-dystopia" performed by Sokoninaru. Crunchyroll is streaming the series. Medialink licensed the series in Southeast Asia and Oceania for streaming on Ani-One Asia's YouTube channel and other streaming platforms.

=== Episodes ===
No.	Title	Directed by (Note: Production staff information is taken from the ending credits of each episode)	Written by	Storyboarded by	Original release date
1	"The Seeds of War"; Transliteration: "Senran no Hajimari" (Japanese: 戦乱の始まり)	Toshihiko Sano	Toshizō Nemoto	Shinji Ishihira	January 10, 2025
In the underworld Felicidad, monsters are grown from seeds by farmers called Farmagia to serve as companions and other facets of society. Ten, a young Farmagia orphan who has not yet accepted a "buddy" monster of his own, strives to grow himself the strongest monsters and join the Oración Seis, six generals who govern Felicidad under its ruling Magus, Diluculum. When Diluculum suddenly dies, his position is assumed by his longest-serving general, Glaza, who proposes a caste system designed to purge Felicidad of its weakest denizens. That night, Glaza's army launches a surprise attack on Centvelt, Ten's hometown on the continent Avrion, which is ruled by Nares, the only general to reject Glaza's leadership. During the chaos, a masked Farmagia razes Centvelt's orphanage and monster farm, which only Ten's crops survive. Ten salvages one of his crops, which produces a pack of Fang buddies that he uses to challenge the masked Farmagia alongside his friend Leii.
2	"Avrion in Revolt"; Transliteration: "Hangyaku no Aurion" (Japanese: 叛逆のアウリオン)	Chako Sano	Toshizō Nemoto	Toshihiko Sano	January 17, 2025
Ten's Fangs and Leii's Arkies are able to injure the masked Farmagia, Zanas, but are outmatched by his Dubhalchan Tiarna. Nares rescues Ten and Leii after defeating Glaza's invasion force with her Leviathan Rosso, a powerful combination of her buddy monsters summoned through her Fusion technique. However, a strike team of Glaza's soldiers disconnects Avrion from the Neural Road, a system of portals between Felicidad's continents. After Zanas retreats, Nares declares rebellion against Glaza and the rest of the Oración Seis, who have allied with him. Nares devises a plan to capture the continent of Perfectus, Felicidad's center of transit; she sends Ten and Leii there with their friends Arche and Lookie-Loo as a commando squad to defeat its general, Manas, while their other friends Anzar and Chica join Avrion's main force to distract Manas' army. Anticipating Nares' strategy, Manas impedes Ten's party with his own subordinates, one of whom they recognize as their long-lost childhood friend Emero.
3	"Reunion in Enemy Territory"; Transliteration: "Tekichi no Saikai" (Japanese: 敵地の再会)	Yūto Nakamura	Toshizō Nemoto	Toshihiko Sano	January 24, 2025
Emero renounces his old friends as traitors, having pledged loyalty to Manas for saving him from his presumed death. After Ten's party defeats his attendants Zucchero and Gâteau, Emero escapes with them by performing a Unite Blitz—a Farmagia technique his friends have not mastered—to combine his Salamad buddies into a more powerful Salamander. Ten believes he can persuade Emero to switch sides by reuniting him with Chica, the only friend whom Emero still shows affection. Zanas attacks the team, but is forced to retreat upon the appearance of a demi-beast, an uncontrollable monster. When Ten kills the demi-beast with his Fangs, he and his friends have a sudden vision of Manas experimenting on Gâteau with a caterpillar-like monster in his palace orchard. Later, Gâteau is reported as one of several recently missing denizens after his earring is found covered in a Fang's claw marks. Manas presents the earring to Emero, who concludes that Ten has killed Gâteau.
4	"The Ties That Bind"; Transliteration: "Musubitsuku Kizuna" (Japanese: 結びつく絆)	Shigeki Awai	Toshizō Nemoto	Toshihiko Sano	January 31, 2025
Emero attacks Ten's party over Gâteau's death, but relents when they explain their vision from their recent demi-beast encounter. Suspecting that Manas is connected to the disappearances, Emero returns to the palace, where he and the party find Zucchero partially transformed into a demi-beast. Manas confirms that Gâteau and the other missing people became mindless "Lost" demi-beasts in his failed experiments to create the Farmagia Hyperion, the ultimate Farmagia, with Gâteau being the monster Ten killed; he forces Zucchero to complete his transformation by feeding on the souls of Myosotises, the caterpillar monsters grown in the orchard, which turns him Lost. Emero reluctantly kills Zucchero and turns against Manas, who becomes a Reaper—a sapient demi-beast—and battles the party. Inspired by the devotion of his party's monsters, Ten successfully unites his Fangs into a Cerberus, which aids Emero's Salamander in killing Manas. Emero leaves to process his thoughts, but not before Ten invites him to follow them to Rahatluk, Avrion's next target. After the party returns to Centvelt, Arche suddenly collapses from fatigue.
5	"To the City of Muscle"; Transliteration: "Kinniku no Miyako e" (Japanese: 筋肉の都へ)	Hiroshi Maezaki & Kayoko Suzuki	Junichirō Ashiki	Shinji Ishihira	February 7, 2025
The bedridden Arche remains behind on her team's mission to Rahatluk, which they infiltrate as merchants to defeat its battle-obsessed ruler, the Oración Seis general Corpus. After a visit from her friends, Arche is privately contacted by Glaza as a countermeasure against Avrion. Chica stows aboard the team's wagon, desperate to reunite with Emero, whom she believes will agree to Ten's invitation. When the team discovers her, their arguing over whether or not to look for Emero prompts her to search on her own, but she is quickly found and imprisoned by Corpus' guards. Corpus, who is eager to challenge Avrion's Farmagia following their defeat of Manas, is disappointed to learn that Chica was uninvolved and violently rebukes her for her submissive behavior. At Zanas' suggestion, Corpus takes her as a hostage to lure her friends into battle. The team happens across Emero while searching for Chica before they are attacked again by Zanas, who informs them of Chica's captivity.
6	"Over My Dead Body"; Transliteration: "Shikabane o Koete" (Japanese: 屍を越えて)	Fumio Itō	Junichirō Ashiki	Shinji Ishihira	February 14, 2025
After Zanas departs, Corpus' servant Sivan brings Ten's party to Corpus' arena, where they battle Corpus for Chica's freedom. Chica overcomes her passiveness and joins the fight, uniting her Ribbhet buddies into a Necroakmancer. The party struggles against Corpus' Reaper form until Ten declares his intent to protect Felicidad's denizens, momentarily assuming a green-haired form that increases his power. Reacting to his power, Ten's unborn monsters are sent to his side by Dentro, the caretaker of Centvelt's orphanage, arriving as fully grown Griffies, which unite into a Grifone. The party defeats Corpus, who allows himself to be dealt a fatal blow; he decrees Rahatluk's alliance with Avrion before dying, revealing that he joined Glaza for his people's protection and organized the battle to test the party's worth. The party returns with Emero to Centvelt, where Chica expresses concern over Corpus' knowledge of their plan, leading Nares to suspect the presence of a spy on Avrion.
7	"The Price of Truth"; Transliteration: "Shinjitsu no Daishō" (Japanese: 真実の代償)	Akira Tsunoda	Junichirō Ashiki	Toshihiko Sano	February 21, 2025
Arche goes missing during a homecoming celebration for Emero. Directed by the party's acquaintance Charlot, Leii finds Arche making a phonecall to Glaza in an alley. Arche confesses that Glaza is forcing her to decipher the continent-destroying Harvest Festival spell written in his grimoire, having placed a deadly curse on her that can only be broken by his death. Dentro recognizes the curse and prepares medicine to offset its effects, sending the party into the forest to retrieve a rare mandrake root as an ingredient. They are challenged over the root by Oración Seis member Lisan, who destroys all but one of the roots and seduces the party with a love charm. Reminded by Lookie-Loo of their bond, Ten negates the charm with the power of his green-haired form. Lisan surrenders the root and retreats after briefly battling the party in her Reaper form. Following her recovery, Arche is cleared of suspicion of being the spy, whom Dentro realizes is someone else. Meanwhile, Lisan is decapitated by her fellow general L'Oreille, who is targeting the rest of the Oración Seis; her death is sensed by Charlot, who is revealed to have been possessing Lisan.
8	"The Chosen One"; Transliteration: "Erabarashi Mono" (Japanese: 選ばれし者)	Yūto Nakamura	Toshizō Nemoto	Toshihiko Sano	February 28, 2025
Ten's party arrives at L'Oreille's continent of Sonrisa to defeat her with Anzar's support, but she, Zanas, and Glaza surround them during Anzar's absence. However, L'Oreille and Zanas betray Glaza and steal his grimoire, depriving him of much of his power. In retaliation, Glaza unmasks Zanas as Anzar, who is revealed to be the true spy. L'Oreille and Anzar trap Glaza inside a barrier with Ten's party before retreating. Glaza assumes his Reaper form and attacks the party with a swarm of magical eyeballs. Arche performs a Unite Blitz in defiance of Glaza, transforming her Turnie buddies into a Rad Turnie. Following Anzar's earlier advice, Arche fills the barrier with her monster's pollen to blind Glaza, allowing Lookie-Loo to use his sensory powers to guide the party in destroying the eyeballs. Ten then achieves a Fusion with his Cerberus and Grifone, which combine into a stronger monster (Note: Identified off-screen as a Tempest Unicorn) that destroys the barrier and kills Glaza, lifting Arche's curse. After Avrion captures L'Oreille's castle, L'Oreille offers to negotiate peace with Nares on Nadeyat'sya, Glaza's former continent. Nares tentatively accepts, attending with Ten's party in her bodyguard force.
9	"The Three Angels"; Transliteration: "Sannin no Tenshi" (Japanese: 三人の天使)	Hiroshi Maezaki & Kayoko Suzuki	Toshizō Nemoto	Shinji Ishihira	March 7, 2025
L'Oreille casts the Harvest Festival on Nadeyat'sya in a surprise attack against Nares. Anzar protects his friends before falling into a crevice, while Nares remains behind to hinder L'Oreille as Dentro teleports the others to Avrion. The souls of Nadeyat'sya's inhabitants are fed to the still-living Diluculum, who publicly announces his plan to kill God by reaping all of Felicidad's souls with the Grand Harvest Festival. En route to a Neural Road to the Magus' lair, Dentro tells Ten's party that he and Diluculum are angels who created Felicidad alongside Diluculum's lover, Eleonora, whom the malevolent God cursed to age rapidly as divine punishment after the three rebelled against Heaven; Diluculum suffers from the same curse due to absorbing Eleonora's soul in an attempt to save her. Seeking to become the Farmagia Hyperion, Diluculum has performed multiple Harvest Festivals to regain his youth, hastening the curse's effects with every casting. Dentro also reveals that Ten and his friends were created by Diluculum, reasoning that they were born inherently powerful to advance Diluculum's goals. When the group reaches the Neural Road, L'Oreille emerges through it.
10	"Through the Darkness"; Transliteration: "Yami o Nukete" (Japanese: 闇を抜けて)	Sumio Watanabe	Junichirō Ashiki	Shinji Ishihira	March 14, 2025
L'Oreille, who has allied with Diluculum to satisfy her sadistic urges, assumes her Reaper form and magically removes Ten and his friends' senses except for pain and hearing. Leii recognizes L'Oreille as the same monster that killed his childhood friend Anemone, whom he abandoned out of fear during the incident. Traumatized, Leii flees as L'Oreille attacks his crippled party. While reflecting on his cowardice, Leii realizes L'Oreille's sense-stealing ability comes from a mystical bell she carries. He rejoins his friends and summons a Cuckoo-Doodle from Centvelt's farm to dampen the bell's noise with its screeching, allowing his Arkies to destroy the bell. He then unites his Arkies into a Karkinos, which he and Ten fuse with the latter's Grifone into a Nova Phoenix, killing L'Oreille. Dentro sends the party to the Magus' lair, where they find the reanimated bodies of the other generals, including Nares, who all transform into demi-beasts.
11	"A Brother's Path"; Transliteration: "Ani no Michi" (Japanese: 兄の道)	Tomio Yamaguchi	Toshizō Nemoto	Shinji Ishihira	March 21, 2025
Ten's party battles the Oración Seis's Lost demi-beast forms, reluctantly killing Nares along with the others after accepting her last request for them to protect Felicidad. The party then rushes to battle Diluculum as he begins casting the Grand Harvest Festival, but they are stopped by Anzar, who has consumed the Oración Seis's souls to defeat Diluculum himself. However, Anzar's feeding also transforms him into a demi-beast, leading him to mindlessly attack his friends. The party realizes Anzar is not fully Lost when he yields after Ten calls out to him, causing them to experience Anzar's memories, which reveal his intentions to protect them while disguised as Zanas. Beckoned by his friends and encouraged by Nares' voice, Anzar returns to normal and joins the party against Diluculum.
12	"The Dragons of Centvelt"; Transliteration: "Sentoberuto Doragonzu" (Japanese: セントベルト・ドラゴンズ)	Yūto Nakamura	Toshizō Nemoto	Toshihiko Sano	March 28, 2025
Diluculum completes the Grand Harvest Festival after consuming the souls of the party's monsters and Dentro. Ten survives and restores his party with the power of his green-haired form, which Diluculum recognizes as that of the Hyperion. Diluculum attacks the party in his ultimate Reaper form, but is easily defeated by their enhanced Fusion monsters; as telepathically informed by Dentro before his death, the party reveals that Dentro secretly suffered the same divine punishment as Eleonora and sacrificed himself to weaken Diluculum. The party extracts Felicidad's souls from Diluculum, restoring the underworld and its denizens; Eleonora and Dentro's souls are also freed and reconcile with Diluculum as he dies. With the Oración Seis's deaths, the party is elected as Felicidad's new leaders, naming themselves the Dragons of Centvelt after their childhood playgroup. Meanwhile, Charlot flies away after pondering what to report to her superiors, revealing her to be an angel.
