= Haru Glory =

- Rave Master character
- Haru Glory as drawn by Hiro Mashima
- First appearance: Rave Master chapter 1: Opened Map (1999)
- Created by: Hiro Mashima
- Voiced by: Japanese Tomokazu Seki; English Yuri Lowenthal

In-universe information
- Alias: Rave Master
- Notable relatives: Gale Glory (father, deceased); Sakura Glory (mother, deceased); Cattleya Glory (sister); Elie (wife); Levin (son); Malakia Symphonia Glory (grandfather, deceased)

Haru Glory (Japanese: ハル・グローリー, Hepburn: Haru Gurōrī) is the main character of the manga Rave Master by Hiro Mashima. Born on Garage Island, Haru was left in the care of his older sister. In the beginning, Haru accidentally fishes his sidekick Plue up, and his owner, Shiba, encounters terrorists from the organization Demon Card. Shiba tells Haru that he has been chosen as his successor, Second Rave Master. Thus he is entrusted the sword Ten Commandments (テン・コマンドメンツ, Ten Komandomentsu; also "TCM", "Decaforce Sword", or "Ten Powers"), his pet dog Plue, and magical stone Rave (レイヴ, Reivu) to grant him power. Seeking power to defeat Demon Card, Haru and Plue set off on a journey to find the rest of the missing Rave stones.

Haru was created by Mashima before the series' beginning. His relationship with his family was explored earlier than planned in order to improve the series' popularity. The character is voiced by Tomokazu Seki and Yuri Lowenthal in Japanese and English, respectively.

Critical response to Haru was mixed, with several critics finding him a conventional hero often seen in series from the same genre. His portrayal in the anime adaptation was met with negative responses for how the localization changed Haru's characterization.

== Creation ==
The Rave Master protagonist, Haru Glory, was designed prior to developing the manga; author Hiro Mashima always wanted to draw him before the series' conception. His sidekick, Plue, was also designed much earlier when Mashima was in high school. In early drafts of the series, Haru was an alchemist able to control metal, but this idea was scrapped as the author found his attacks maniacal. This led to the new concept of Haru being a swordsman. Mashima later came up with the idea of a larger Ten Commandments Sword so that Haru could perform several types of attacks with the same weapon. Mashima decided on a caring personality while being open to the idea of Haru being violent.

Haru is the successor of the supporting character Shiba, who was planned to die in the first story arc. However, this idea was also discarded, as the author found it would negatively affect Haru and Plue's journey. Mashima wanted his readers to have familiar names for his protagonists: Haru's given name means spring to emphasize his warm personality. During production, Mashima considered Haru as the "angsty hard-working type". While writing his next work, Fairy Tail, Mashima made the new main character Natsu Dragneel calmer than Haru.

Early during publication, Rave Master almost faced cancellation due to complaints found in reader surveys. As a result, Mashima was forced to move the story to the parts he found more interesting, involving Haru's father, Gale, and his rival, King. King dies, leaving his son, Lucia, to be Haru's true final enemy. The second fight between Haru and Lucia serves as a halfway point of the Rave Master manga. From this point, the plot would focus on mysteries, most notably how Shiba knows of Haru or the connection between the protagonist and Lucia. During the finale, Mashima enjoyed the scene where Haru encourages Shuda to fight together in order to surpass Gale, which led to toning down the previous fight. Mashima had mixed feelings about the final fight between Haru and Lucia, as he wonders if he should have given it more chapters. The idea of Haru surviving the aftermath surprised several readers, though Mashima still suggests it was overshadowed by Elie's older appearance.

In Japanese, Haru is voiced by Tomokazu Seki. His replacement for the English adaptation is Yuri Lowenthal. Lowenthal said that Haru was one of his first leading roles, but expressed disappointment due to him being unable to finish the story.

== Appearances ==
=== Rave Master ===
At the series' beginning, Haru meets a creature known as Plue and meets the previous Rave Master Shiba, who realizes the youth to be his successor. After realizing the threat that the Demon Card organization poses to the world, Haru promises Shiba that he will find the Rave Stone and stop the Demon Card's evil with Plue by his side. Along the way, he is joined by allies that each have their own goals, yet they were bound together thanks to him and helping each other along the way. As the Rave Master, Haru carries a special sword called the Ten Commandments (TCM, "Ten Powers" in the English dub) that can change from its Eisenmeteor form to nine other forms once the Rave Stones are embedded into it. Later, he encounters Gale Raregroove, the king of the Raregroove Kingdom and leader of Demon Card. On the Tower of Din, Haru reunites with his absent father Gale Glory to defeat King and end Demon Card. Although they win, Gale sacrifices himself to save his son from Din's destruction.

Some time later, King's son, Lucia, appears and revives Demon Card. He wishes to capture Elie to use the magical energy known as Etherion hidden within her body. While facing Lucia and his forces, Haru's group learn of the mythical creature known as Endless, which threatens mankind by provoking another Overdrive and can only be destroyed with Etherion. In order to be the fully-fledged Second Rave Master, Haru has a ceremonial fight with a young Shiba. As Shiba fought for the sake of Resha, Haru decides his reason to fight is to protect Elie, which gives the strength to win the duel and becomes the heir of Rave. After Haru finds all of the Raves, Elie uses Etherion to combine them. In order to avoid another Overdrive, Haru and his friends oppose Lucia and his strongest enemies in the Star Memory. Although Haru defeats Lucia, he is absorbed by Endless and convinces Elie to destroy it, even if it means taking his life. One year later, Elie loses her memories of Haru, and she and the others visit his grave. Haru is revived due to the Star Memory's magic and reunites with Elie, who then remembers him. Haru and Elie return to Garage Island to live together with a final scene of the manga revealing they have a child named Levin, who inherited Elie's amnesia.

=== Other appearances ===
Haru appears in a manga omake crossover chapter of Fairy Tail titled "Fairy Tail × Rave Master", first published in Issue #5 of Magazine Special in 2011, and collected in the second volume of the compilation Fairy Tail S, released on September 16, 2016. The chapter was adapted into an original video animation of the same name released on August 16, 2013, with voice actor Tomokazu Seki reprising his role. Haru also appears in Mashima Hero's, a manga series crossover with Fairy Tail and Edens Zero that released from October 16 to December 25, 2019.

== Reception ==
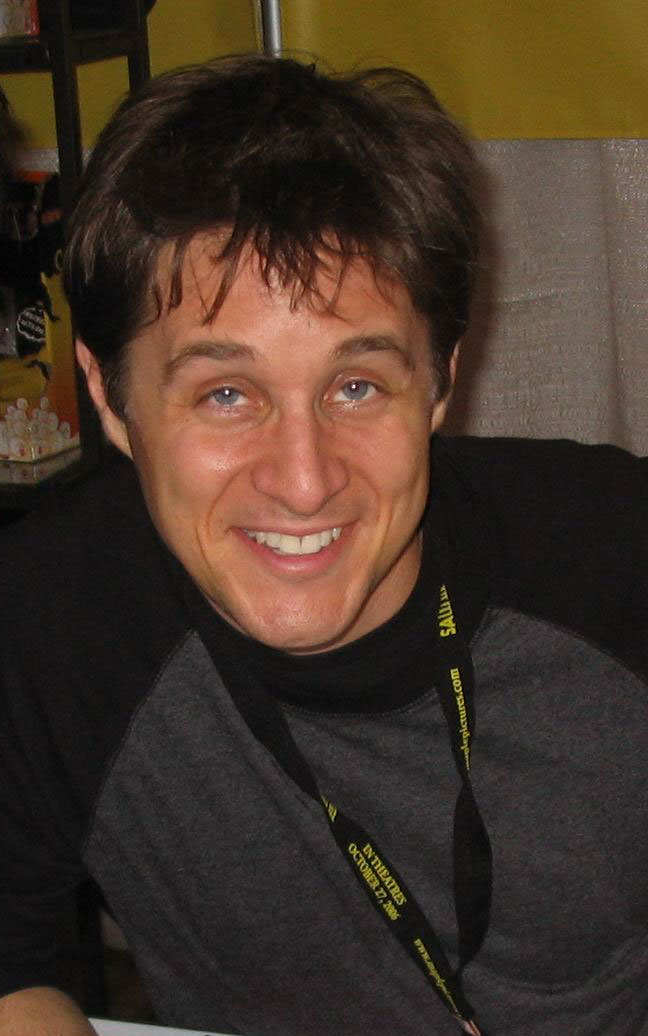
Lowenthal in 2007

Overall, there were mixed reviews on Haru's character. UK Anime Network said that there were major depths in his role in the story. Additionally, the review noted that his character felt influenced by Final Fantasy VII protagonist Cloud Strife due to how both wield oversized swords and have pointy hair, among other elements. Anime News Network criticized Haru's writing, finding it too simple, but praised that the character searched for his father. Similarly, Chris Beveridge from Mania Entertainment enjoyed the expansion of Haru's family story in the manga as he and his father become allies once the antagonists were established within the story. THEM Anime Reviews opined that Haru was too simple in regards to his design and role in the story. Manga News also found Haru conventional, but felt his execution to be properly made by the author, additionally noting that Mashima seemed to have made the character to rival the ones from the manga series One Piece.

The Haru from the anime adaptation received similar comments by Anime News Network, but had mixed feelings about his dynamics with Elie about whether or not they are more appealing when interacting. DVDTalk criticized his usage of a sword when compared with the villains who use more conventional weaponry and was bothered by how the protagonist did not care about his enemies' sins. While still finding him as a conventional protagonist, Anime News Network still felt that Haru's values and relationships made him more interesting as the narrative progresses. Yuri Lowenthal's performance as Haru was criticized for coming across as a cartoon character aimed at young children due to him yelling when fighting. However, Lowenthal's performance was noticed by director Marc Handler, leading to his eventual inclusion in the anime Naruto as the role of Sasuke Uchiha.

Erkael from Manga News seeing Haru fight alongside Shiki and Natsu in Mashima's Heros felt that it was fanservice. Haru and Elie inspired two types of perfume by Erie Eau de Parfum.
