= Dead Rock =

Japanese manga series by Hiro Mashima

- First tankōbon volume cover, featuring Yakuto (front) and his dragon form (back)
- Genre: Adventure; Dark fantasy
- Manga
- Written by: Hiro Mashima
- Published by: Kodansha
- English publisher: NA: Kodansha USA
- Imprint: Monthly Shōnen Magazine Comics
- Magazine: Monthly Shōnen Magazine
- Original run: July 6, 2023 – present
- Volumes: 8
- icon

Dead Rock (stylized in all caps) is a Japanese manga series written and illustrated by Hiro Mashima. It has been serialized in Kodansha's shōnen manga magazine Monthly Shōnen Magazine since July 2023, with its chapters collected in eight tankōbon volumes as of October 2026.

== Plot ==
Dead Rock is an academy in the demon world where students are trained to conquer the human world as demon rulers. Yakuto, a young demon descended from a black dragon, is one of seven applicants who pass the school's deadly special entrance exam into Class 1-F. On his first day of class, Yakuto murders his homeroom teacher and reveals his true objective is to kill the school principal, a supreme evil being who claims to be God. To this end, Yakuto involves his classmates in his plans as they fight to survive Dead Rock's brutal curriculum, murderous teachers, and ambitious rival students.

== Characters ==
Yakuto (ヤクト)
A demon boy who seeks revenge against God for exterminating his people, the Dragon Roots. He has the power to transform his arm or entire body into that of his "root" ancestor, a black dragon, the latter of which reduces his lifespan. His dragon form resembles Fairy Tail character Acnologia.
Frey (フレイ, Furei)
A battle enthusiast who manipulates fire with the power of her root, an ifrit. She enrolls in Dead Rock to surpass her older sister, who failed to graduate from the school.
Raizen (ライゼン)
A swordsman whose Orochi root allows him to split his weapon into eight copies. He seeks to rescue his kingdom's princess, whose soul is sealed within his broadsword.
Hien (ヒエン)
A wolf-eared demon with the root of Fenrir, capable of creating ice with his katana. He hails from a feudal clan rumored to have caused their homeland's eternal winter.
Mikoto (ミコト)
A necromancer whose lich root allows her to reanimate the dead as flesh-eating zombies. She is later revealed to be an agent of Ghost, the demon world's secret service.
Hani (ハニー, Hanī)
A living haniwa and descendant of Thor who wields a lightning-infused hammer. He is intelligent and analytical, desiring to study humans rather than conquer them.
Zelecia (ゼレシア, Zereshia) / Chako (チャコ)
A cat-eared girl with a black wizard root who often takes the form of a talking crow descended from Yatagarasu. She shares Yakuto's goal of killing God.
Elfed (エルフェド, Erufedo) / God (神, Kami)
A supreme deity who serves as principal of Dead Rock. He is suspected by Yakuto to be a fake who replaced a previous God.

== Publication ==
Written and illustrated by Hiro Mashima, Dead Rock started in Kodansha's shōnen manga magazine Monthly Shōnen Magazine on July 6, 2023. Mashima has stated that he had not intended for the manga to be a long series, but extended it due to positive reader reception. The series went on hiatus in May 2026, and is scheduled to resume publication in Q4 of the same year. Kodansha has collected its chapters into individual tankōbon volumes, with the first released on November 16, 2023. As of October 16, 2026, eight volumes have been released.

In July 2024, Kodansha USA announced that it had licensed the manga for English release in North America, with the first volume released on March 4, 2025. Five English volumes have been released as of September 15, 2026.

=== Volumes ===
No.	Original release date	Original ISBN	English release date	English ISBN
1	November 16, 2023	978-4-06-533310-5	March 4, 2025	979-8-88-877350-5
1. "God of the Demon World" (魔界の神, Makai no Kami); 2. "School Rule Number Three" (校則第三条, Kōsoku Daisanjō); 3. "Classroom Massacre" (皆殺しの教室, Minagoroshi no Kyōshitsu)
2	April 9, 2024	978-4-06-535370-7	June 10, 2025	979-8-88-877374-1
4. "Death Arena" (大闘技場(デスアリーナ), Desu Arīna); 5. "Fire Cry"; 6. "God Saves" (ゴッドセイブズ, Goddo Seibuzu); 7. "Curse Velocity" (カーズベロシティ, Kāzu Beroshiti)
3	August 7, 2024	978-4-06-536168-9	August 12, 2025	979-8-88-877478-6
8. "Yakuto vs. Cougar" (ヤクトvs.クウガ, Yakuto vs. Kūga); 9. "You Can't Have My Prey" (獲物は渡さない, Emono wa Watasanai); 10. "Slaughter" (惨殺, Zansatsu); 11. "Deep Cry" (ディープクライ, Dīpu Kurai); 12. "White Calamity" (白い厄災, Shiroi Yakusai)
4	February 7, 2025	978-4-06-537931-8	February 3, 2026	979-8-88-877511-0
13. "Class F vs. Bren" (F組vs.ブレン, Efu-gumi vs. Buren); 14. "Dead or Alive" (デッド・オア・アライブ, Deddo oa Araibu); 15. "Ghost" (ゴースト, Gōsuto); 16. "The Afternoon Portion" (午後の部, Gogo no Bu); 17. "Eiji and Dest" (エイジとデスト, Eiji to Desuto)
5	July 9, 2025	978-4-06-540094-4	September 15, 2026	979-8-88-877806-7
18. "The Slime vs. the Nine-Tailed Fox" (スライムvs.九尾の狐, Suraimu vs. Kyūbi no Kitsune); 19. "Words I'm Burning to Say" (伝えたい炎(ことば), Tsutaetai Kotoba); 20. "Hecatoncheire" (百手(ヘカトンケイル), Hekatonkeiru); 21. "The Rule Murmuring Death" (死を囁くルール, Shi o Sasayaku Rūru); 22. "A Rondo of Flame and Wolf" (炎と狼の輪舞曲(ロンド), Honō to Ōkami no Rondo)
6	December 9, 2025	978-4-06-541645-7	December 15, 2026	979-8-88-877985-9
23. "Ifrit" (炎王(イフリート), Ifurīto); 24. "A Class on Living" (生きる為の授業, Ikiru Tame no Jugyō); 25. "Consolation Prize" (残念賞, Zannenshō); 26. "Faith" (信仰, Shinkō); 27. "Elfed" (エルフェド, Erufedo)
7	May 8, 2026	978-4-06-541645-7	March 16, 2027	979-8-90-074255-7
28. "Sensei" (先生); 29. "The Hecatoncheire" (ヘカトンケイル, Hekatonkeiru); 30. "Underneath the Mask" (その仮面の下には, Sono Kamen no Shita ni wa); 31. "Reunion" (再会, Saikai)
8	October 16, 2026	978-4-06-544964-6	—	—
32. "What I'll Do" (僕のやる事, Boku no Yaru Koto); 33. "What You Believe In..." (信じるものは..., Shinjiru Mono wa...); 34. "All He Has Left" (残された時間, Nokosareta Jikan); 35. "God Fragment" (神の欠片, Kami no Kakera)

== Reception ==
Reviewing the first English volume for Anime News Network, Rebecca Silverman rated it three stars out of five, criticizing the large number of characters introduced in the first chapter, but expressing interest in its setting; MrAJCosplay wrote more positively, giving it four stars while praising the "air of mystery" surrounding the characters.
