= Jiro Saito (voice actor) =

Japanese voice actor

- 斉藤 次郎
- Born: 1965 (age 60–61); Tochigi, Japan
- Occupation: Voice actor
- Years active: 2002-present
- Agent: Kenyu Office

Jiro Saito (斉藤 次郎, Saitō Jirō) is a Japanese voice actor, specialising in anime films.

== Filmography ==
=== Television animation ===
- Gantz (2004), Adult Onion Alien
- Romeo × Juliet (2007), Camilo
- Hunter x Hunter (2011), Leol
- One-Punch Man (2015), Beast King
- Drifters (2016), Shimazu Yoshihiro
- This Art Club Has a Problem! (2016), Takeda
- Re:Zero − Starting Life in Another World (2016), Bordeaux Zellgef
- The Saga of Tanya the Evil (2017), Moritz Paul von Hans
- One Piece (2017), Charlotte Snack, Rampo, Orlumbus, Tacos, Uzuki Tempura and Benevolent King of the Waves
- Pocket Monsters: Sun & Moon (2019), Mohn
- Isekai Cheat Magician (2019), Dortesheim
- Attack on Titan: The Final Season (2020), Magath
- Peach Boy Riverside (2021), Dog
- Pocket Monsters (2022), Mohn
- Delicious Party Pretty Cure (2022), Matasaburou Asai
- Frieren (2024), Denken
- Bucchigiri?! (2024), Kenichiro
- Shinkalion: Change the World (2024), Tango Kawagoe
- My Deer Friend Nokotan (2024), Souichirou Kumatori
- The Rising of the Shield Hero Season 4 (2025), Jaralis
- Backstabbed in a Backwater Dungeon (2025), Santor

=== Original video animation (OVA) ===
- Detective Conan Magic File 3 "Shinichi and Ran — The Memories from Mahjong pieces and Tanabata (2009), Hasegawa

=== Original net animation (ONA) ===
- Steel Ball Run: JoJo's Bizarre Adventure (2026), Benjamin Boomboom

=== Animated films ===
- The Empire of Corpses (2015), Seigo Yamazawa
- Fairy Tail: Dragon Cry (2017), Zash Caine
- The Legend of the Galactic Heroes: Die Neue These Seiran (2019), Otho von Braunschweig

=== Video games ===
- Mobile Suit Gundam Unicorn (2012)
- Assassin's Creed: Brotherhood (2010)
- The King of Fighters All Star (2019)
- Fullmetal Alchemist Mobile (2022), Alex Louis Armstrong
- Magical Drop VI (2023), Emperor (DLC 1) and Father Strength (DLC 2)
- Final Fantasy XVI (2023), Otto

=== Dubbing ===
==== Live-action ====
- Idris Elba
  - Thor, Heimdall
  - Thor: The Dark World, Heimdall
  - Avengers: Age of Ultron, Heimdall
  - Bastille Day, Sean Briar
  - Molly's Game, Charlie Jaffey
  - Thor: Ragnarok, Heimdall
  - Avengers: Infinity War, Heimdall
  - The Harder They Fall, Rufus Buck
  - Beast, Dr. Nate Samuels
  - Extraction 2, Alcott
- 12 Strong, Chief Warrant Officer Hal Spencer (Michael Shannon)
- 30 Minutes or Less, King Dwayne (Danny McBride)
- Amsterdam, Det. Lem Getweiler (Matthias Schoenaerts)
- Batman Begins, Thomas Wayne (Linus Roache)
- Battleship, JPJ XO Mullenaro
- Beauty and the Beast, Perducas (Eduardo Noriega)
- Big Miracle, Colonel Scott Boyer (Dermot Mulroney)
- Bloodline, Danny Rayburn (Ben Mendelsohn)
- Brick Mansions, Lino Duppre (David Belle)
- Burlesque, Marcus Gerber (Eric Dane)
- Diary of a Wimpy Kid, Coach Malone (Andrew McNee)
- District 9, Christopher Johnson (Jason Cope)
- The Expendables 3, Goran Vata (Robert Davi)
- Fences, Lyons Maxson (Russell Hornsby)
- The Final Destination, George Lanter (Mykelti Williamson)
- Good People, Jack Witkowski (Sam Spruell)
- The Good, the Bad, the Weird, Byeong-choon (Yoon Je-moon)
- Hobbs & Shaw, Tsoi (Tom Wu)
- Houdini & Doyle, Horace Merring (Tim McInnerny)
- Ignition, Peter Scanlon (Nicholas Lea)
- John Q., Guard Max Conlin (Ethan Suplee)
- Kings of South Beach, Enrique (Ricardo Antonio Chavira)
- Kite, Detective Prinsloo (Deon Lotz)
- The Lucky One, Keith Clayton (Jay R. Ferguson)
- Made of Honor, Colin McMurray (Kevin McKidd)
- The Onion Movie, Kip Kendall (Scott Klace)
- The Passage, Jonas Lear (Henry Ian Cusick)
- Quarantine, George Fletcher (Johnathon Schaech)
- REC 2, Chief Fernández (Oscar Sánchez Zafra)
- Rocketman, Fred (Tom Bennett)
- The Shallows, Carlos (Óscar Jaenada)
- Transformers: Dark of the Moon, Soundwave
- Turistas, Finn (Desmond Askew)
- USS Indianapolis: Men of Courage, Lt. Adrian Marks (Thomas Jane)
- War for the Planet of the Apes, Maurice (Karin Konoval)
- Wild, Paul (Thomas Sadoski)
- Wolf Man, Grady Lovell (Sam Jaeger)

==== Animation ====
- Cars 2 (Victor Hugo)
- Klaus (Mogens)
- Madagascar 3: Europe's Most Wanted (Jonesy the Dog)
- Mary and Max (Damien Popodopoulos)
- Planes: Fire & Rescue (Ryker)
