= Chameleon (manga) =

Japanese manga series by Atsushi Kase

- First tankōbon volume cover, featuring Eisaku Yazawa

カメレオン (Kamereon)
- Genre: Action; Comedy; Yankī
- Manga
- Written by: Atsushi Kase
- Published by: Kodansha
- Imprint: Shōnen Magazine Comics
- Magazine: Weekly Shōnen Magazine
- Original run: April 11, 1990 – February 2, 2000
- Volumes: 47
- Original video animation
- Directed by: Mitsuo Hashimoto
- Written by: Takao Yotsuji
- Music by: Saburo Takada
- Studio: Studio Egg
- Licensed by: NA: ADV Films (#1 only)
- Released: August 16, 1992 – March 22, 1996
- Runtime: 50 min per episode
- Episodes: 6
- Manga

Kuro Ageha
- Written by: Atsushi Kase
- Published by: Kodansha
- Imprint: Monthly Shōnen Magazine Comics
- Magazine: Monthly Shōnen Magazine
- Original run: December 6, 2014 – December 6, 2022
- Volumes: 20
- icon

Chameleon (Japanese: カメレオン, Hepburn: Kamereon) is a Japanese manga series written and illustrated by Atsushi Kase. It was serialized in Kodansha's shōnen manga magazine Weekly Shōnen Magazine from April 1990 to February 2000, with its chapters collected in 47 tankōbon volumes. The series follows the antics of tenth-grade student Eisaku Yazawa who wants to become a bōsōzoku.

A six-episode original video animation produced by Studio Egg was released from August 1992 to March 1996. The first episode was released in North America by ADV Films (in Japanese with English subtitles), under the title Bite Me! Chameleon, in February 1999.

The manga has had over 30 million copies in circulation. It won the 23rd Kodansha Manga Award in the shōnen category in 1999.

== Media ==
=== Manga ===
Written and illustrated by Atsushi Kase, Chameleon was serialized in Kodansha's shōnen manga magazine Weekly Shōnen Magazine from April 11, 1990, to February 2, 2000. Kodansha collected its chapters in 47 tankōbon volumes, released from August 17, 1990, to March 16, 2000.

A one-shot chapter, titled Chameleon Seven Years After (カメレオン Seven Years After), was released in Kodansha's Monthly Shōnen Magazine on November 6, 2014; a manga sequel, titled Kuro Ageha (くろアゲハ; lit. "Black Swallowtail"), started in the same magazine on December 6 of the same year. It finished on December 6, 2022. Kodansha collected its chapters in 20 tankōbon volumes, released from May 16, 2014, to February 16, 2023.

=== Original video animation ===
A six-episode original video animation (OVA) adaptation, produced by Studio Egg, was released from August 16, 1992, to March 22, 1996. It is set to be released on Blu-ray on April 24, 2024.

The first OVA episode was released by ADV Films (in Japanese with English Subtitles), under the title Bite Me! Chameleon, on February 23, 1999.

=== Live-action film ===
A direct-to-video live action film adaptation, produced by Nihon Eizō, was released on February 23, 1996.

=== Other media ===
In 2008, Hiro Mashima illustrated a one-shot remake of Chameleon for the 50th anniversary of Weekly Shōnen Magazine.

A pachinko game, called CR Chameleon, was by Taiyo Elec in 2012.

== Reception ==
The manga has had over 30 million copies in circulation. It won the 23rd Kodansha Manga Award in the shōnen category in 1999.
