= Monster Soul =

Japanese manga series

- Cover of the first volume
- Manga
- Written by: Hiro Mashima
- Published by: Kodansha
- English publisher: NA: Kodansha USA
- Magazine: Comic BomBom
- Original run: January 2006 – August 11, 2007
- Volumes: 2

Monster Soul (stylized in all caps) is a Japanese manga series written and illustrated by Hiro Mashima. It was serialized in Comic BomBom from January 2006 to August 2007 and collected into two tankōbon volumes.

== Plot ==
Monster Soul is set in Elvenland, a fantasy world where humans and monsters live as segregated groups. The main characters are a group of monsters called the Black Airs, who are recorded as the strongest monster squadron in a war between the two races. The manga's "first stage" consists of episodic stories that focus on the Black Airs' fight to uphold peace and harmony between humans and monsters. In the "second stage", the Black Airs travel to Hell to help a human boy save his captured townspeople from the Drei Kommandos, a monster trio that aims to awaken a formidable evil.

== Characters ==
=== Black Airs ===
Aki (アキ)
A monster with the appearance of a hoodie-wearing human boy with two small horns on his head. Dismissed by poachers for his apparent weakness and low bounty, he is in reality a rare and powerful S-type monster who assumes his soul form, a horned lycanthrope called a dire wolf, when enraged. He immediately falls asleep whenever he uses up his power.
Tooran (トゥーラン, Tūran)
A golem who appears as a human girl. She is the self-described pop idol of the monster world, often behaving in a spoiled fashion. Her body is made of sand that she uses to attack or create a harp for musical enchantments. She has a human mother while her golem father died in a desert rainfall, which Tooran survived due to being half-human.
James (ジェームス, Jēmusu)
A robot monster called a frankenstein who possesses various weapons and mechanical functions within his body. He was constructed by humans to hunt other monsters, but was deemed defective and abandoned due to his kind nature. His face is prone to falling off.
Mummy (マミィ, Mamyi)
A mummy-woman dressed in pink bandages, which she manipulates as her weapons. She also carries a giant syringe containing healing liquid. She acts as the Black Airs' older sister figure, and is often embarrassed by their foolishness. She habitually attempts to strip for no apparent reason.
Joba (ジョバ)
An onion imp, a rare species of monster with an onion-shaped head. He serves as the Black Airs' mascot.

=== First Stage characters ===
Vulcan Brothers (バルカン・ブラザーズ, Barukan Burazāzu)
A human duo of poachers who hunt monsters for money.
Bacon (ベーコン, Bēkon)
A ghost monster with the power to turn invisible and brainwash others. He leads a revolutionary movement against humans to avenge his parents, who were killed in the human-monster war.
Kiyo (キヨ)
An elderly fairy who creates powder that puts others to sleep. She is a brainwashed member of Bacon's revolutionary army.
Jenny (ジェニー, Jenī)
Kiyo's daughter, a young and beautiful fairy who opposes Bacon for brainwashing her mother.
Garuelf (ガルエルフ, Garuerufu)
A three-headed chimaera. Two of his heads, a lion and goat, are situated between his shoulders and address each other as brothers; the third, a snake, serves as his tail. He is Aki's childhood bully who targets him to acquire his S-type soul.

=== Second Stage characters ===
==== Drei Kommandos ====
Blank (ブランク, Buranku)
A skeleton monster who leads the Drei Kommandos. He is an agile combatant who fires sticks of dynamite from the two holes in his skull.
Guyna (ガイナ, Gaina)
A rock ogre whose body is made of numerous rocks that he manipulates freely. His face falls off like James's.
Kiriko (キリコ)
A vampire with a second mouth on her neck that drains others' blood.

==== Others ====
Selsh (セルシュ, Serushu)
The young human prince of Diochram. He is prejudiced against monsters, which changes as he fights alongside the Black Airs to rescue his people from the Drei Kommandos.
Pooch (ポチ, Pochi)
A three-headed cerberus who guards the gate to Hell.
Jobo (ジョボ)
A diminutive ogre soldier who resembles Joba and reports to the Drei Kommandos.
Beluze (ベルーゼ, Berūze)
A "destroyer-class" monster called a Soul Eater who gains power by consuming the souls of humans and monsters alike. Formerly a human monster hunter whom Aki defeated as a child, he is reborn as a monster to take revenge against Aki.

== Publication ==
Written and illustrated by Hiro Mashima, the series was serialized in two stages in Kodansha's Comic BomBom magazine; the first was serialized from January to March 2006 and the second was serialized from May 15 to August 11, 2007. (Note: It began serialization in the June 2007 issue of Comic BomBom, which was released on May 15.)

=== Volumes ===
No.	Original release date	Original ISBN	English release date	English ISBN
1	January 17, 2007	978-4-06-332061-9	May 13, 2014	978-1-61-262589-8
1. "Here Come the Black Airs!!" (闇の翼(ブラックエアーズ)あらわる!!, Burakku Eāzu Arawaru!!); 2. "Monster Revolution!!" (魔物(モンスター)革命!!, Monsutā Kakumei!!); 3. "Turn Your Love Into Power!!" (思いを力に変えて!!, Omoi o Chikara ni Kaete!!)
2	September 14, 2007	978-4-06-332098-5	August 12, 2014	978-1-61-262590-4
1. "Hellions" (地獄の種族(ヘルタールーツ), Herutā Rūtsu); 2. "First Block of Hell" (地獄の1丁目, Jigoku no Ichi-chōme); 3. "The Kindhearted Weapon" (優しい兵器, Yasashii Heiki); 4. "Soul" (魂(ソウル), Sōru)

== Reception ==
Rebecca Silverman of Anime News Network praised the artwork and concept of the story, though she also felt it was generic and lacked plot. Danica Davidson of Otaku USA praised the flow and characters, though she also described their jokes as "crude". J. Caleb Mozzocco of School Library Journal felt that it contained similar elements to those in other Mashima works and recommended the manga to Mashima's fans.
