= Fairy Tail: 100 Years Quest =

Japanese manga series

- Cover of the first tankōbon volume of Fairy Tail: 100 Years Quest

FAIRY TAIL 100年クエスト (Fearī Teiru: Hyaku-nen Kuesuto)
- Genre: Adventure, fantasy
- Manga
- Written by: Hiro Mashima (Note: Credited as storyboarder)
- Illustrated by: Atsuo Ueda
- Published by: Kodansha
- English publisher: NA: Kodansha USA
- Imprint: Shōnen Magazine Comics
- Magazine: Magazine Pocket
- Original run: July 25, 2018 – present
- Volumes: 24
- Anime television series
- Directed by: Shinji Ishihira (Note: Credited as chief director (総監督, Sō Kantoku)); Toshinori Watabe
- Produced by: Yoshiyuki Shioya (Note: Credited as chief producer (チーフプロデューサー)); Yuri Terao; Yuzuru Saitō; Tetsuya Endo; Ryōsuke Ōno
- Written by: Atsuhiro Tomioka
- Music by: Yasuharu Takanashi
- Studio: J.C.Staff
- Licensed by: Crunchyroll (streaming); SEA: Muse Communication
- Original network: TXN (TV Tokyo)
- Original run: July 7, 2024 – January 5, 2025
- Episodes: 25
- icon

Fairy Tail: 100 Years Quest (Note: Alternatively subtitled Hyaku-nen Kuesuto (100年クエスト) for Japanese readers) (stylized in all caps) is a Japanese manga series written and storyboarded by Hiro Mashima, and illustrated by Atsuo Ueda. It is a sequel to Mashima's previous series, Fairy Tail. The manga was launched in Kodansha's Magazine Pocket manga app in July 2018, and is licensed by Kodansha USA for an English release in North America. As of August 2026, twenty-four tankōbon volumes have been released in Japan. An anime television series adaptation produced by J.C.Staff aired from July 2024 to January 2025.

== Plot ==
One year after the demise of Zeref and Acnologia, Natsu Dragneel and his team from the Fairy Tail wizard guild disembark to the continent of Guiltina for the 100 Years Quest, a mission that has been unaccomplished for over a century. Their client, the immortal Dragon Slayer Elefseria, reveals that the quest's purpose is to seal renegade dragons called the Five Dragon Gods—Ignia, Mercphobia, Aldoron, Selene, and Viernes—who threaten to cause worldwide destruction. Natsu subdues Mercphobia with aid from Ignia, Igneel's malicious biological son, who challenges Natsu to strengthen himself for a one-on-one battle.

Meanwhile, Fairy Tail recruits a new member, Touka, unaware that she is the host of another wizard named Faris. Claiming to be the White Wizard, the leader of a malevolent white magic cult, Faris takes control of Fairy Tail in a crusade to erase sources of powerful magic. Wendy Marvell separates Faris from Touka after Selene deceives Faris into awakening the slumbering Aldoron, who is killed by Natsu. Despite Faris's actions, the team saves her and Touka's endangered home, the parallel world of Elentear, after learning that Selene has been threatening Faris into defeating the other Dragon Gods for her own safety and amusement.

Selene seizes control of Diabolos—a Dragon Slayer guild that feuds with Fairy Tail over the 100 Years Quest—to retrieve knowledge of Athena, a weapon built by Elefseria's pupil as a deterrent against the Five Dragon Gods. However, Fairy Tail and Diabolos are forced to unite against Ignia's ally Dogramag, a sixth Dragon God believed to have been slain by Elefseria, who ends hostilities with Selene after Natsu kills Dogramag. Further investigation reveals Athena to be the true, mechanical White Wizard utilized by Gold Owl, an alchemist guild formed from Viernes's disembodied will. Persuaded by Lucy Heartfilia to rebel, Athena helps Natsu kill Viernes.

As the last remaining Dragon God, Ignia reveals his plan to destroy humanity by turning Guiltina's population into dragons and reenacting the Dragon King Festival, a historic event in which Acnologia exterminated much of the dragon race. Fairy Tail and Ignia's forces also clash with Faris' native Earthland counterpart, a black wizard imbued with Acnologia's power.

== Production ==
Development on a sequel for Fairy Tail began prior to the release of the original manga's final tankōbon volume following its end of publication in July 2017. Series creator and artist Hiro Mashima initially had no intention to continue the story himself, as the project's developers had decided that another artist would draw it. He was later asked by the manga's editor to be involved as the series storyboarder. Mashima revealed the sequel's development in a tweet on April 5, 2018. On June 27, Mashima announced that the manga was tentatively titled Fairy Tail Zokuhen (FAIRY TAIL続編; lit. 'Fairy Tail Sequel'), which was confirmed on July 4 to be drawn by Atsuo Ueda.

== Media ==
=== Manga ===
The manga was launched with two chapters in Kodansha's Magazine Pocket manga app on July 25, 2018, while the first chapter was simultaneously published in the 34th issue of Weekly Shōnen Magazine. The following chapters were released weekly until September 5, 2018, when they transitioned to a biweekly release schedule. The manga was published for an English language release by Kodansha USA in August 2019.

=== Anime ===
An anime television series adaptation was announced during the "Hiro Mashima Fan Meeting" livestream in September 2021. The anime series is produced by J.C.Staff and directed by Toshinori Watanabe, with Shinji Ishihira serving as chief director, Atsuhiro Tomioka supervising scripts, Yurika Sako designing the characters, and Yasuharu Takanashi composing the music. It aired from July 7, 2024, to January 5, 2025, on TV Tokyo and its affiliates. Crunchyroll streamed the series outside of Asia. Muse Communication licensed the series in Southeast Asia.

== Reception ==
The manga's first tankōbon volume debuted at the eleventh spot of Oricon's weekly Japanese sales charts for printed comics.

Anime News Network's Rebecca Silverman gave the first volume an overall "B" score, considering its two storylines to be a "promising start" to the series, and praising the setting for expanding the original story's mythology. However, she criticized its slow pace and inconsistencies to the previous series. Silverman opined that Ueda does a "very credible job" copying Mashima's artstyle, calling the differences "fairly negligible".
