= Monster Hunter Orage =

Japanese manga series

- Monster Hunter Orage promotional image

モンスターハンター オラージュ (Monsutā Hantā Orāju)
- Genre: Adventure, fantasy
- Manga
- Written by: Hiro Mashima
- Published by: Kodansha
- English publisher: NA: Kodansha USA
- Magazine: Monthly Shōnen Rival
- Original run: April 4, 2008 – May 2, 2009
- Volumes: 4

Monster Hunter Orage (Japanese: モンスターハンター オラージュ, Hepburn: Monsutā Hantā Orāju) is a Japanese manga series written and illustrated by Hiro Mashima. Loosely based on the Monster Hunter series of video games by Capcom, Monster Hunter Orage premiered in Kodansha's shōnen manga magazine Monthly Shōnen Rival in April 2008.

== Plot ==
The story takes place in a fictional world full of monsters and adventurers called Monster Hunters, who, as their name implies, hunt the monsters. The plot revolves around a young child, Shiki, who was taken in as an apprentice to a Monster Hunter named Greylee as a child. A few years after Greylee's death, which was due to a gunpowder incident, he returns to his master's residence, Akamaaya Town, to join the guild there. In that guild, he meets a girl called Ailee and after a series of events, he finds that she is the daughter of his master. From this point onwards, they form a party to find the legendary Myo Galuna, which was Greylee's lifelong ambition.

== Characters ==
Shiki Ryûhô (シキ・リュウホウ, Shiki Ryūhō)
Shiki is very cheerful and always puts his friends' well-being before his own. He has the 'Mark of the Forbidden/Sealed Hunter' which he presumably received from Greylee. This seal allows him access to all hunting grounds. Even after his master's death, he often talks to him as if speaking to his spirit, and it is evident that he truly cared for and respected his master. His dream is to hunt down the legendary Myo Galuna. He wields the twin wind swords Sou Kaze Ha / Sou Fuu Jin (Arashi) which are said to be made from the materials of Myo Galuna. He also has a pact with the ancient steel dragon Kushala that they would fight. This was made when Greylee had just met him.
Ailee Jeskar (アイリィ・ジェスカー, Airii Jesukā)
Ailee is the daughter of Greylee Jescar. She forms a party with Shiki to find the legendary Myo Galuna. She thinks that she does not need any friends because of what happened to her and a group of her "friends", who are illegally hunting monsters before the beginning of the series. As a result, she confesses to the authorities and suffers punishment as well, since they are comrades. Part of her punishment is a lifetime ban from taking the Forbidden Hunter exam. Later, a man named Gordon, from the Guild's poaching counter-measure department, tests Ailee by asking Shiki and Sakya to help him with illegal selling. Ailee slapped him and told him not to involve her partners in a crime. He later reports to the guild, and says that he has no objection with Ailee traveling with those forbidden hunters. She wields the long sword Iron Katana Gospel then Sakya improved it to The "Eager Cleaver" then later on to "The Devil Slicer" and her armor is said to be made from materials from Derumaiosu.
Sakya (サクヤ, Sakuya)
Sakya is the daughter to a blacksmith that crossed paths with Ailee's father long ago and just like Ailee she too lost her father at a young age. She thought that he had left her and her mother to live in some big city away from their swamp home, but he had been crystallized by a derumaisou that had plagued their home for a long time. Shiki and Ailee helped Sakya kill the derumaisou and afterwards she built Shiki and Ailee their new weapons "Arashi" and "Eager Cleaver" and joined them in their quest to find the Myo Galuna while also pursuing her father's dream of building the best weapon that could be built. She wields a light bowgun, the Beltines. She is uncomfortable with any exposure of her body. She develops apparent feelings for Shiki.
Greylee Jeskar (グレリィ・ジェスカー, Gurerii Jesukā)
Graylee is Shiki's master and father to Ailee. Years before the events of the series, he apparently dies due to a suspected incident with gunpowder, but has been hinted to not actually be the case. His life-long ambition is to hunt the legendary Myo Galuna. He had a 'Mark of the Sealed Hunter' and is said to be able to equip most weapons. His main weapon of choice is, however, the Great Sword Tsukai Teda.
Curlon Belusas (クーロン・ベルーサス, Kūron Berūsasu)
His weapon is Gunlance of the 'Guild Knight Series', and he is the leader of the Hunter group Hell Hounds. His nickname is 'The Prince' and he frequently gets his grammar and use of words wrong. He does not like Shiki and considers him a rival, and he also thinks Shiki took away the woman he loves, which is Ailee (although it is only one-sided love). As such, he wishes to become a Forbidden Hunter. He allies with Shadow in order to do so. In chapter 9, he finally became a forbidden hunter. He uses a Steel Gunlance as his weapon of choice.
Shadow (シャドウ, Shadō)
Shadow possesses an unusual weapon not shown in the Monster Hunter Series, the whip. He's quite a mysterious character who is willing to help Curlon become a Forbidden Hunter just like Shiki, but he must help Shadow get a hold of Shiki's rare Wind Element Dual Swords. He is a weapon creator studying to make Wind Element weapons, however Shiki beats him to it earning him Shadow's undying hatred. Curlon betrays him and has him arrested for ruining Ailee's life when she was younger.
Gordon (ゴードン, Gōdon)
Gordon is a man the Guild's poaching counter-measure department. He is sent to test if Ailee was involved with illegal selling that has already resulted in her being banned from taking the Forbidden Hunter exam. He later goes back to report that Ailee was not guilty and said that she has met some good friends. He also has no objection with her traveling with those forbidden hunters.

== Chapters ==
No.	Original release date	Original ISBN	English release date	English ISBN
1	August 4, 2008	978-4-06-380001-2	June 28, 2011	978-1-935429-49-4
01. "Monster Hunter" (モンスターハンター, Monsutā Hantā); 02. "A Chance Meeting Is an Opportunity" (世界をつくるのは出会い, Sekai o Tsukuru no wa Deai); 03. "The Things Three Can Do" (3人ならば出来ること, San-nin Naraba Dekiru Koto)
2	December 4, 2008	978-4-06-380017-3	August 23, 2011	978-1-935429-50-0
04. "Royal Paleontologist" (王立古生物書士隊, Ōritsu Koseibutsu Shoshi-tai); 05. "The Strength to Believe" (信じる心, Shinjiru Kokoro); 06. "I Can Do It On My Own!" (私一人で!, Watashi Hitori de!); 07. "The Final Star" (最後の星, Saigo no Hoshi)
3	April 3, 2009	978-4-06-380036-4	December 27, 2011	978-1-935429-51-7
08. "The Day It All Began" (始まりの日, Hajimari no Hi); 09. "Orage" (オラージュ, Orāju); 10. "Starcrusher" (星崩し, Hoshi Kuzushi); 11. "Reunion" (再会, Saikai)
4	August 4, 2009	978-4-06-380060-9	January 17, 2012	978-1-935429-52-4
12. "With Four" (4人なら, Yon-nin Nara); 13. "Myo Galuna, the Thunder Dragon" (輝龍ミオガルナ, Kiryū Mio Garuna); 14. "The Hunters" (ハンターたち, Hantā-tachi)
