= Natsu Dragneel =

Fictional character from Fairy Tail

- Fairy Tail character
- Natsu Dragneel as drawn by Hiro Mashima
- First appearance: Fairy Tail chapter 1: The Fairy's Tail (2006)
- Created by: Hiro Mashima
- Voiced by: Japanese Tetsuya Kakihara Mako (child); English Todd Haberkorn Luci Christian (child)

In-universe information
- Full name: Natsu Dragneel
- Aliases: Salamander; Etherious Natsu Dragneel (E.N.D.)
- Species: Demon (Etherious)
- Family: Unnamed parents (deceased); Zeref Dragneel (brother, deceased); August (nephew, deceased); Igneel (adoptive father, deceased); Ignia (adoptive brother); Wed (adoptive nephew)
- Guild: Fairy Tail
- Magic: Fire Dragon Slayer Magic

Natsu "Salamander" (Note: 火竜(サラマンダー), Saramandā; Japanese text translates as "Fire Dragon") Dragneel (Japanese: ナツ・ドラグニル, Hepburn: Natsu Doraguniru) is a fictional character and protagonist of the Fairy Tail manga series created by Hiro Mashima. First making his debut in Fairy Tail chapter #1, "The Fairy's Tail", (Note: 妖精の尻尾(フェアリーテイル), Fearī Teiru) originally published in Japan's Weekly Shōnen Magazine on August 2, 2006, Natsu is depicted as a member of the eponymous wizards' guild, who are notorious in the fictional Kingdom of Fiore for their numerous accounts of causing unintentional property damage with their magic. Being a Dragon Slayer, (Note: 滅竜魔導士(ドラゴンスレイヤー), Doragon Sureiyā; Japanese text translates as "dragon-slaying wizard") Natsu possesses the same abilities as his foster father, the dragon Igneel, namely the ability to consume and manipulate fire. Natsu's predominant role in the series is to reunite with Igneel, who has been missing for seven years by the story's outset. He appears in most Fairy Tail media, including both feature films, all original video animations (OVAs), light novels, and video games. He is voiced by Tetsuya Kakihara in Japanese, while Todd Haberkorn voices him in the English dub.

Mashima has considered Natsu to be among his favorite characters, and claimed that he based him on his own characteristics. Reviewers have largely praised Natsu's character, noting his action-packed combat scenes and upbeat demeanor throughout the series. His motion sickness has also been well-received as a humorous element within the story. Natsu has placed high in popularity polls, and many different pieces of merchandise related to him, such as action figures, have been released.

== Creation and conception ==
During the making of the series Rave Master, manga author Hiro Mashima considered the protagonist Haru Glory as the "angsty hard-working type". As a result, when writing Fairy Tail, Mashima made the new lead Natsu to be calmer than Haru. Natsu Dragneel was one of the first characters Hiro Mashima created during the development of Fairy Tail. He was conceptualized as a fire-using member of a courier guild who would suffer from motion sickness, a character trait the author based on one of his friends. Mashima implemented Natsu's motion sickness into the final version of the character, believing that this and his pink hair make the character unique. Mashima cited his own personality as a junior high school student as the inspiration for Natsu's personality, and his father's death as an influence for the relationship between Natsu and Igneel. Natsu's concept evolved in a one-shot short story titled Fairy Tale, where he is depicted as a spirit with horns. He is normally portrayed as wearing black-colored clothing, which Mashima chose in favor of his original choice of red to improve the contrast between the character's fire abilities and clothes. The author mentioned that Natsu had been designed to give the best of himself when it comes to everything. Mashima regarded Natsu's development throughout the story as great and stated that the series could easily progress because of it. The author also commented that Natsu is his favorite character.

Mashima named Natsu after the Japanese word for "summer" (夏, natsu) to avoid using Western fantasy names that would sound unfamiliar to the Japanese audience, and to follow up on the fact that the protagonist of his earlier work Rave Master is called Haru, which means "spring" (春, haru). Mashima also said that the names of both characters highlight their personality traits, with Natsu being "a fiery guy" as opposed to the "warm" Haru.

Natsu's age is left ambiguous throughout the series, with the character's age listed as "unknown" on the cover of chapter 23. A scene occurs during chapter 108 in which he is trapped behind a runic blockade designed to prevent those over the age of 80 from crossing; as a response to questions about the scene, which were submitted by readers for the "Emergency Request! Explain the Mysteries of Fairy Tail" section of the manga's volume 15 tankōbon release, it is asserted that the character's age is actually not over 80, and that "beyond that would be revealing an important plot point".

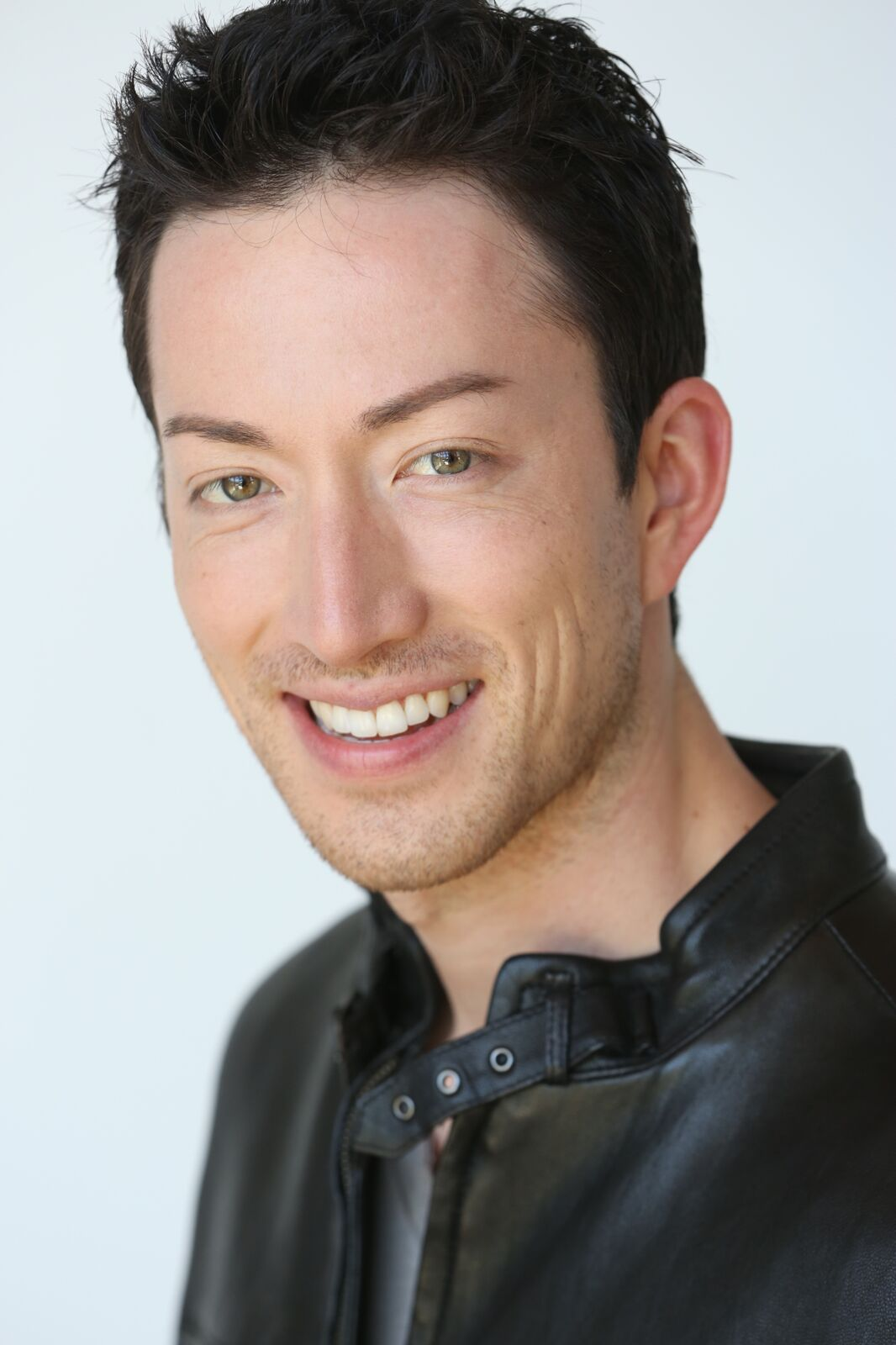
Todd Haberkorn voices Natsu in the English dub.

Regarding the anime adaptation of the series, Mashima commented that his favorite part is seeing Natsu and Happy move around, characterizing them as "fun". Mashima stated that he loves Natsu's voice from the anime. When the Fairy Tail anime started being released in North America, Mashima was concerned about actor Todd Haberkorn's voice since Natsu, the character he plays, often yelled across the story. Haberkorn mentioned that one of his favorite aspects of voicing Natsu was leaving the recording studio without a voice. Tetsuya Kakihara, Natsu's Japanese voice actor, said that while he had not initially wanted to voice Natsu and had instead hoped to voice the character Gray Fullbuster, he had come to love playing Natsu and thought he was meant to voice him. He further mentioned that Natsu is his favorite character and considered him "fantastic". He also described Natsu's character as difficult because he has exceptional gifts compared to his friends. Kakihara stated that each scene in which he voiced Natsu remained in his mind, adding that he regarded Happy as his own partner since he is Natsu's companion.

== Appearances ==
=== In Fairy Tail ===
Natsu first appears in Fairy Tail chapter #1, "The Fairy's Tail", which was originally released on August 2, 2006, in Weekly Shōnen Magazine. He is an orphan raised and trained by the dragon Igneel, whose disappearance Natsu notes on the date of July 7, X777, seven years before the beginning of the narrative. Upon introduction, Natsu is a famed member of the Fairy Tail wizards' guild who notoriously causes most of the collateral damage for which his guild is blamed. During the first chapter, Natsu and his Exceed companion, Happy, rescue celestial wizard Lucy Heartfilia from a criminal operating under Natsu's alias, "Salamander", whom Natsu confuses for Igneel, an actual salamander. The three form a team to perform missions together, later being joined by two of Natsu's childhood rivals, ice wizard Gray Fullbuster and armor wizard Erza Scarlet, becoming what their guildmates label as Fairy Tail's most powerful team.

Natsu is eventually selected to participate in Fairy Tail's S-Class promotional trial held on Sirius Island, the guild's sacred ground. The exam is interrupted when Natsu and his guildmates encounter Zeref, an immortal dark wizard who wishes to be killed by Natsu but is not recognized by him. After Natsu defeats Hades, master of the dark guild Grimoire Heart, the black dragon Acnologia assaults the Fairy Tail wizards, who are protected and placed into seven years of suspended animation within the magic Fairy Sphere cast by the spirit of Mavis Vermillion, Fairy Tail's founding guild master. Returning to find that Fairy Tail has fallen behind the other wizard guilds in the Kingdom of Fiore, Natsu participates in the Grand Magic Games tournament with his friends to regain their guild's prestige. Following Fairy Tail's victory in the tournament, the guild becomes embroiled in a war between Fairy Tail and Tartaros, a dark guild of Etherious demons created by Zeref that seek to summon E.N.D., Zeref's ultimate demon. When Acnologia appears and threatens both guilds, Igneel emerges from Natsu's body, revealed to have sealed himself within Natsu at the time of their apparent separation in order to inoculate him against dragonification, a Dragon Slayer affliction that transforms them into dragons similar to Acnologia. After his strength proves insufficient to prevent Acnologia from killing Igneel, Natsu embarks on a training journey with Happy to avenge Igneel.

One year later, a significantly strengthened Natsu reunites with Lucy and helps her reform the guild, which has disbanded in his absence. During Zeref's ensuing invasion with the militaristic Alvarez Empire, Zeref identifies Natsu as his younger brother and the true incarnation of E.N.D.—Etherious Natsu Dragneel—resurrected from death as a child to kill Zeref. It is further revealed that Igneel raised Natsu at Zeref's behest four-hundred years ago, sending him to July 7, X777 in the present era through Eclipse, Zeref's time travel gate, to secure Igneel's sealing technique and defeat Acnologia. After a failed attempt to kill Zeref, Natsu's demonic transformation is triggered, which manifests as a tumor-like "demon seed"; this, coupled with a similar "dragon seed" that induces dragonification, endangers his life. After falling into a coma following a rampage in his demon form, he recovers by asserting his humanity during a metaphysical dream, destroying both seeds. He subsequently defeats Zeref, acknowledging their brotherly bond, while Lucy edits the book containing Natsu's demonic essence to sever his connection to it. Natsu then kills Acnologia by destroying his disembodied spirit inside a space-time rift after his allies immobilize the dragon's body within Fairy Sphere. In the epilogue, Natsu and his team depart on a 100 Years Quest, a guild mission that has never been accomplished in under a century.

=== In other media ===
Natsu appears in both Fairy Tail films. In Fairy Tail the Movie: Phoenix Priestess (2012), Natsu defeats Dist, the leader of the Carbuncle guild. Natsu also makes an appearance in the one-shot prologue manga created by Hiro Mashima for this film and in its animated adaptation. In the sequel Fairy Tail: Dragon Cry (2017), he fights and wins against Animus, the ruler of the kingdom of Stella, while half of Natsu's body takes on the appearance of a dragon.

Natsu is also a character in all nine Fairy Tail original video animations (OVAs). In the first OVA, Natsu cleans a swimming pool alongside other Fairy Tail guild members; in the second, he is depicted as an academy student; in the third, he is sent to the past by a magic book; in the fourth, Natsu goes to a camp in order to train for the Grand Magic Games; in the fifth, he spends time at a water park; the sixth is a crossover OVA of Fairy Tail and Hiro Mashima's Rave Master series, where Natsu meets Rave Master protagonist Haru Glory and Rave Master heroine Elie; in the seventh, Natsu participates in a penalty game; in the eighth, he tries to cheer Mavis Vermillion up; and in the ninth, Natsu attends a Christmas party held at Lucy's house. He also appears in every light novel based on the series, including one where he is a samurai, and one which is inspired by the Alice in Wonderland novel. Natsu is also present in Fairy Tail: 100 Years Quest, the sequel to the Fairy Tail manga that directly continues the original story. He appears in several spin-offs from the original manga as well.

Natsu is a playable character in several Fairy Tail video games, such as the PlayStation Portable action video game Fairy Tail: Portable Guild (2010) developed by Konami and its two sequels — Fairy Tail: Portable Guild 2 (2011) and Fairy Tail: Zeref Awakens (2012). He is present in the multi-platform role-playing video game developed by Gust Co. Ltd. as well. Natsu also appears in crossover video games, including Sunday vs Magazine: Shūketsu! Chōjō Daikessen (2009) alongside Lucy.

== Powers and abilities ==
Natsu is a Dragon Slayer trained by Igneel to use Fire Dragon Slayer Magic, (Note: 火の滅竜魔法, Hi no Metsuryū Mahō) which grants him the ability to consume and create fire, and makes him immune to fire-based attacks. He also possesses other superhuman abilities such as immense strength, a heightened sense of smell and hearing, and resilience against otherwise lethal attacks. Because of his sharpened senses, however, he suffers from incapacitating motion sickness when riding transportation of any sort.

Over the course of the series, Natsu learns to use Dragon Force, (Note: ドラゴンフォース, Doragon Fōsu) a temporary form that increases his power to that of a real dragon, which he initially attains by consuming certain magic sources before learning to use it on command. He also augments his fire magic with Laxus Dreyar's lightning magic after consuming it during the battle with Hades, allowing Natsu to enter a form called Thunder-Fire Dragon Mode. (Note: モード雷炎竜, Mōdo Raien-ryū) His power further increases after the vigilante guild Crime Sorcière unlocks his Second Origin, a reserve of magic hidden within all wizards' bodies, which allows him to overpower wizards who have surpassed him in strength during Natsu's seven years of suspended animation. Eventually, following one year of training to defeat Acnologia, Natsu achieves greater power by entering Fire Dragon King Mode, (Note: モード炎竜王, Mōdo Enryūō) which uses a limited reserve of magic left within him by Igneel.

== Reception ==
=== Critical response ===
Critical reception of Natsu's character has generally been positive. Journalists have analyzed his characterization in the manga. While reviewing the manga series, Carl Kimlinger of Anime News Network (ANN) mentioned that the story usually followed the pattern where Natsu showed how strong he was every time he ended up in a bad situation. He also commented that Natsu has "strong principles, insane power", and a "wacky weakness", stating that all of these traits make him a model for characters from shōnen action manga. Kimlinger said that placing Natsu against dangerous villains managed to create real interest. He further characterized Natsu as "an often frightening force", but he also depicted him as being "little more than a short fuse" with a sense of humor and motion sickness. Carlo Santos of the same website thought that Natsu's fight against wind wizard Erigor, the acting leader of the dark guild Eisenwald, was the highlight of that particular volume. Santos further stated that Natsu being called a "flaming brat" added humor to the story. He also commented that Natsu had become a hero following the events from the Tower of Heaven. The writer described Natsu's battle cries as "fierce" and his "flamethrowing magic" as "intense". Rebecca Silverman of the same website wrote that Natsu proved to be both intelligent and creative during his fight with a villain from the Grimoire Heart guild. Silverman further added that Natsu had started being depicted as falling suggestively on Lucy more often, and she believed this highlighted the idea of love and romance in the manga. A. E. Sparrow of IGN mentioned that Natsu, being a fire wizard with motion sickness, is "a complex character", and he said that it would be fun to watch him throughout the series. David West of Neo felt that Natsu's fire-based abilities match his quick-tempered nature and said the character has a tendency to scuffle. The writer described Natsu as "reckless and wild", stating that the character's fire magic is destructive. Dale North of Japanator regarded Natsu as "one of the best and most powerful" Fairy Tail members and described his fighting skills as "incredible".

Critics have also provided comments in regard to Natsu based on how he was depicted in Fairy Tail's animated adaptation and feature films. Reviewing the anime, Carlo Santos felt that Natsu's abilities were not expanded on at the beginning of the story and said Natsu's fire magic was presented through mediocre animation. He further stated that Natsu's motion sickness produced "cheesy humor"; nonetheless, Santos considered Natsu "pumped-up" and energetic, and he praised Todd Haberkorn's role as Natsu's English voice actor. The reviewer said that Natsu's fight against Dragon Slayer Gajeel Redfox was "eye-catching". He elaborated on this by mentioning that Natsu's confrontation with Gajeel showed "pure fighting spirit", stating that he enjoyed "the clash of fire and metal" and "their intense Type-A personalities"; Santos described Natsu's final blow from this battle as "epic". He also stated that Natsu's fight against wizard Jellal Fernandes was one of the greatest confrontations in the series. He further mentioned that Natsu's acrobatic moves provided some "truly great visuals"; nevertheless, Santos felt that Natsu winning his fights in the same manner became a cliché in the story. Carl Kimlinger criticized Tetsuya Kakihara's role as Natsu's Japanese voice actor, but he approved of Haberkorn's voice acting. Kimlinger wrote that while Natsu's partnership with Happy and Lucy was bizarre, it represented the main part of the story. Rebecca Silverman praised Natsu's skill in taking care of children, stating that he proved to be "competent at something besides fighting"; she also said this was "a nice inversion" of the trope in which the heroine is the one showing her abilities when it comes to parenting. David West thought Natsu is "colorful and loud". Crystalyn Hodgkins of ANN wrote that Haberkorn was suitable for Natsu's voice, but she felt he could have sometimes sounded more enthusiastic. Andy Hanley of UK Anime Network described Natsu as one of "Fairy Tail's brightest young names", and Richard Gutierrez of The Fandom Post regarded Natsu's behavior as a form of humor. While reviewing Fairy Tail the Movie: Phoenix Priestess, Kimlinger praised that Natsu resembled his portrayal from the manga series, and he enjoyed Haberkorn's performance. Reviewing Fairy Tail: Dragon Cry, Silverman stated that the scenes in the opening sequence which depicted Natsu's childhood were "nice reminders of what brought him to where he currently is".

=== Popularity and merchandise ===
In a popularity poll published in the 26th issue of Weekly Shōnen Magazine, Natsu ranked second, obtaining a total of 7343 votes. Merchandise inspired by Natsu has been released, including action figures. Necklaces based on him have been produced. Badges inspired by him have also been created.

== See also ==
- List of Fairy Tail characters
