= Hiro Mashima's Playground =

Japanese manga anthology by Hiro Mashima

- Cover of the first volume

ましまえん (Mashima-en)
- Manga
- Written by: Hiro Mashima
- Published by: Kodansha
- English publisher: NA: Kodansha USA
- Magazine: Weekly Shōnen Magazine
- Published: December 16, 2003
- Volumes: 2

Hiro Mashima's Playground (Japanese: ましまえん, Hepburn: Mashima-en) is a Japanese anthology of manga written and illustrated by Hiro Mashima. It collects eight one-shots originally published in Kodansha's Weekly Shōnen Magazine between 1998 and 2003. The anthology was released as two volumes in Japan in December 2003, and as one volume in North America in 2018.

== Overview ==
Magician
Published in 1998's 51st issue of Kodansha's Weekly Shōnen Magazine. In order to save the school's Magician's Club, Aoi and his friends are tasked with rescuing the principal's dog.
Written while he worked part-time at an arcade, Magician won Mashima Weekly Shōnen Magazine's Rookie Prize and around $7,000. He said the "seed" for the story came from thinking how silly it would be if a hero saved himself by using sleight of hand. It also marks the debut of his character Plue. Mashima called Magician the worst story included in the first volume of Hiro Mashima's Playground, and questioned how it ever won a prize.
Fairy Tale
Published in the extra Fresh issue of Kodansha's Weekly Shōnen Magazine on September 3, 2002. In order to prove to his dad that he is an adult now, Silva, prince of the Fire Tribe, teams up with El, princess of the Water Tribe, to recover a stolen national treasure.
Mashima described Fairy Tale as a well-done story and relatively polished due to it originally being conceived as a serial he could start following completion of his then-ongoing Rave Master. When the short story he previously submitted to his editors was rejected, he decided to turn Fairy Tale into a short story, since he only had two days before the deadline.
Cocona
Published in 2003's 29th issue of Kodansha's Weekly Shōnen Magazine. Cocona, princess of devils, wants to become human so she can be with the man she loves.
Planning to make a romantic comedy, Mashima's first two drafts of Cocona were rejected. He felt the first, a "giant-robot fantasy" about a beautiful princess and her fighting robot, could potentially become a serial. The second rejected idea was about a beautiful princess and a gallant knight who travel through time. He then came up with the story where a devil princess falls in love, and wanted to include a cat because his previous two manga had dogs even though he prefers to draw cats.
Plue's Adventure II
Published in 2002's 6th issue of Kodansha's Weekly Shōnen Magazine. A gamebook, where Plue and Griffon Kato set out to recover the stolen Candy Orb.
Mashima described Plue's Adventure II as more of a "bonus piece" than a short story. Plue's Adventure I was included in volume 16 of Rave Master, and Mashima was surprised by its positive reception. He acknowledged the second would have been better in a Rave Master collection, but said it just did not work out that way.
Bad Boys Song
Published in August 1998's 31st issue of Kodansha's Weekly Shōnen Magazine, also known as Magazine Fresh. With three months until graduation, a group of delinquents want to leave their mark on high school.
Mashima said Bad Boys Song was a story he hesitated to include in Hiro Mashima's Playground. He wrote it while waiting for the results of the Rookie Prize that Magician would eventually win, but it was actually published first, so the author said he does not know which of the two manga is actually his debut work. He drew inspiration from his own high school days, and took its title from Hiroshi Tanaka's story Bad Boys.
Magic Party
Published in September 2000's 4th issue of Kodansha's Weekly Shōnen Magazine, also known as Magazine Fresh. In order to become a professional wizard, Elena is tasked with finding a spell book.
Mashima noted that Magic Party has some similarities to both Cocona and Magician, since he loves transformations and magic. Originally intended to be a serial where a magic-school dropout grew up over time, after Harry Potter came out, he dropped the wizard-school plot, kept the characters and world and turned it into a short story. Its title comes from the magical-power metric commonly found in role-playing games.
Xmas Hearts
Published in 2003's double 2/3 issue of Kodansha's Weekly Shōnen Magazine. Young Santa Claus Strat hates Christmas and plans to blow off his duties, until all the cakes on Earth are stolen.
After hearing that the magazine issue would be published around Christmas, Mashima decided to do something seasonal. Although he hoped for something "deep and moving," he called Strat his least favorite protagonist. Mashima does like his father though, whom he modeled after actor Mel Gibson around the time of Ransom.
Combo Squad Mixture
Published in 2003's 48th issue of Kodansha's Weekly Shōnen Magazine. The three worst-rated Heroes are given one last chance by being paired together and told they must reach a 90% approval rating in one month or they will be fired.
In reverse to most of the other manga in the collection, Combo Squad Mixture was conceived to be a short story before Mashima began to think about turning it into a serial as it grew. It was inspired by the sentai television series he watched a lot as a kid. Because of all the humor, the author made sure to note that the story is meant as an homage to those shows and is not making fun of them.

== Publication ==
The anthology contains eight one-shots by Hiro Mashima originally published in Kodansha's Weekly Shōnen Magazine between 1998 and 2003. The first volume contains Magician, Fairy Tale, Cocona, and Plue's Adventure II; the second contains Bad Boys Song, MP (Magic Party), Xmas Hearts, and Fighting Force Mixture. Both tankōbon volumes were released on December 16, 2003.

At Anime Expo 2018, Kodansha USA announced they licensed the anthology for English publication. They released both Japanese volumes in one volume on October 30, 2018.

=== Volume list ===
No.	Original release date	Original ISBN	English release date	English ISBN
1	December 16, 2003	978-4-06-334821-7	October 30, 2018	978-1-63-236759-4
Magician (マジシャン, Majishan); Fairy Tale (フェアリー・テール, Fearī Tēru); Cocona (ココナ, Kokona); Plue's Adventure II (プルーの冒険日記II, Purū Bōken Nikki II)
2	December 16, 2003	978-4-06-334822-4	October 30, 2018	978-1-63-236759-4
Bad Boys Song (バット ボーイズ ソング, Baddo Bōizu Songu); Magic Party (MP(マジックパーティー), Majikku Pātī); Xmas Hearts; Combo Squad Mixture (混合戦隊ミクスチャー, Kongō Sentai Mikusuchā)

== Reception ==
Ian Wolf from Anime UK News praised Mashima's artwork, though also stated that reading all the stories in the anthology at once can make them feel predictable. As part of Anime News Network's fall 2018 manga guide, Amy McNulty, Faye Hopper, Rebecca Silverman, and Teresa Navarro reviewed the anthology for the website. McNulty and Silverman praised the artwork and plot of the stories, while Hopper and Navarro were more critical of Mashima's stories. Takato from Manga News concurred with Wolf, McNulty, and Silverman, praising both the plot and artwork of the various one-shots. Nicholas Demay from Planete BD concurred with previous critics, calling the plot of the various stories "very entertaining".
