= Hiro Mashima =

Japanese manga artist

- 真島 ヒロ
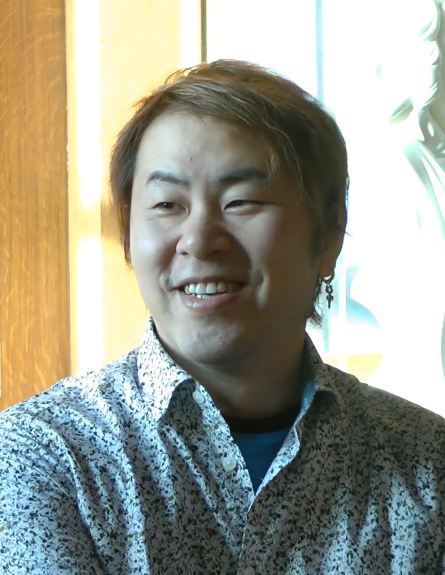
- Mashima in 2018
- Born: May 3, 1977 (age 49); Nagano, Japan
- Occupation: Manga artist
- Years active: 1998–present
- Employer: Kodansha
- Notable work: Rave Master; Fairy Tail; Edens Zero; Dead Rock; Farmagia
- Children: 1
- Awards: Kodansha Manga Award (2009)

Hiro Mashima (真島 ヒロ, Mashima Hiro; born May 3, 1977) is a Japanese manga artist. He gained success with his first serial Rave Master, published in Kodansha's Weekly Shōnen Magazine from 1999 to 2005. His best-selling work, Fairy Tail, published in the same magazine from 2006 to 2017, became one of the best-selling manga series with over 72 million copies in print.

Fairy Tail won the Kodansha Manga Award for shōnen manga in 2009, and Mashima was given the Harvey Awards International Spotlight award in 2017 and the Fauve Special Award at the 2018 Angoulême International Comics Festival.

== Early life ==
Mashima stated that he knew he wanted to be a manga artist for as long as he can recall. His father was an artist that aspired to turn professional, but died when Mashima was young. Living in the mountains as a child, his grandfather would bring him discarded manga that he found. After reading them, Mashima would draw from them. In middle school, he began to rebel and get into trouble, but still drew everyday. In high school, he became guitarist in a rock band named Night Meeting, which played a show every two or three months. Mashima was eventually indefinitely suspended from school due to his delinquency and, after reflecting during this time away, decided he would try to make it as a professional manga artist. Moving to Tokyo after graduating high school, he entered a school specializing in teaching manga artists, but left without completing the studies. He stated that while it taught him the basics, he felt it would not help as a professional.

== Career ==
In 1998, Mashima created the one-shot manga Magician while working part-time at an arcade, and entered it into a competition held by Kodansha's Weekly Shōnen Magazine. While waiting for the results, his one-shot Bad Boys Song was published in August 1998. When Magician was published in 1998's 51st issue of Weekly Shōnen Magazine, it won the Rookie Prize and earned Mashima around $7,000. He made his official serialization debut the following year with Rave Master in Weekly Shōnen Magazine. It ran until 2005 and was adapted into an anime titled Groove Adventure Rave from 2001 to 2002. In 2003, he collected some of his one-shot titles into the two volume Hiro Mashima's Playground, which was licensed for a North American release in 2018. After completing Rave Master, Mashima serialized Monster Soul in the monthly magazine Comic BomBom from 2005 to 2007.

Mashima began Fairy Tail in Weekly Shōnen Magazine in 2006 and it went on to become one of the best-selling manga series in history with over 72 million copies in print. It spawned a large franchise, including numerous spin-offs and adaptations, before ending in 2017. In 2011, Mashima created a crossover manga between Rave Master and Fairy Tail published in the May issue of Weekly Shōnen Magazine. It was adapted into an original video animation released in August 2013. A special 2013 issue of Weekly Shōnen Magazine featured a small crossover between Fairy Tail and Nakaba Suzuki's The Seven Deadly Sins, where each artist drew a yonkoma (four-panel comic) of the other's series. An actual crossover chapter between these two ran in December 2013. From July 17, 2014, to July 17, 2015, Fairy Tail had its own monthly magazine titled Monthly Fairy Tail Magazine, which included a prequel manga by Mashima himself titled Fairy Tail Zero.

In 2014, three spin-offs were started: Fairy Tail: Ice Trail by Yūsuke Shirato; Fairy Tail Blue Mistral by Rui Watanabe; and Fairy Girls by Boku. Another spin-off manga titled Fairy Tail Side Stories and created by Kyōta Shibano launched on July 30, 2015, in Kodansha's free Magazine Pocket mobile app. On July 25, 2018, Fairy Tail: 100 Years Quest began on Magazine Pocket as the official sequel to Fairy Tail. Mashima provides the original storyboards for the manga, which is illustrated by Atsuo Ueda. At the end of 2021, Mashima approached Kodansha Game Creators Lab to hold a contest looking for video game proposals based on Fairy Tail with the winning work receiving $132,300, $88,200 of which came from Mashima himself. The games would be created for platforms such as Steam, iOS and Android, and Kodansha would distribute the winner to be decided in April 2022, with the profits shared between Kodansha and the developers.

While creating Fairy Tail, Mashima serialized Monster Hunter Orage, an adaptation of the Monster Hunter video games, in Monthly Shōnen Rival from 2008 to 2009. Also in 2008, he drew a remake of Atsushi Kase's gag manga Chameleon for the 50th anniversary of Weekly Shōnen Magazine. Mashima's Japanese-style epic fantasy one-shot Hoshigami no Satsuki was published in the September 17, 2014 issue of Weekly Shōnen Magazine.

Mashima began the series Edens Zero in Weekly Shōnen Magazine on June 27, 2018, which ended on June 26, 2024. From October to December 2019, he created the mini-series Mashima Hero's in Weekly Shōnen Magazine for its 60th anniversary. It is a crossover between his three series Rave Master, Fairy Tail and Edens Zero. Mashima drew a one-shot manga adaptation of the video game Dragon Quest XI S: Echoes of an Elusive Age for the October issue of Shueisha's V Jump magazine, which was released on August 21, 2019. On December 17, 2021, Mashima announced that he was developing an Edens Zero video game by himself using RPG Maker. Describing it as a "hobby project" that he worked on in his free time, he released Rebecca to Kikai no Yōkan for free on PC on March 16, 2022.

During Edens Zero's run, Mashima began the series Dead Rock in Monthly Shōnen Magazine on July 6, 2023. Initially announced to be a short series, the manga was extended by Mashima due to positive reader reception. In May 2026, Dead Rock entered hiatus and Mashima announced the development of a Fairy Tail manga miniseries celebrating its 20th anniversary, released in Weekly Shōnen Magazine on July 29, 2026.

== Style and influences ==
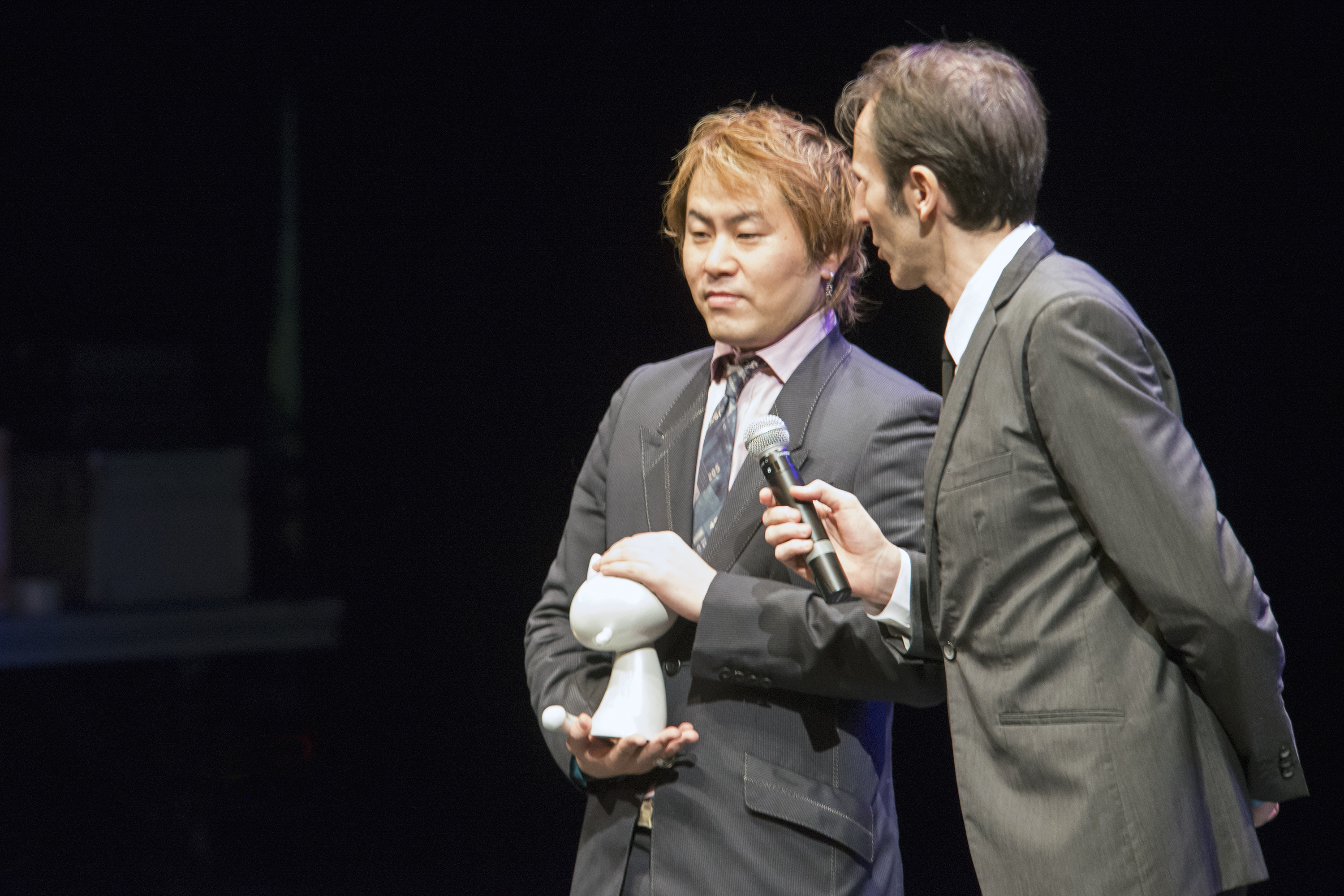
Mashima accepting the Fauve Special Award at the Angoulême International Comics Festival, 2018

Mashima listed Akira Toriyama's Dragon Ball as his favorite manga growing up, the video game series Dragon Quest, and Yudetamago's Kinnikuman as inspiring him to become an artist. He also read/watched several works by Hayao Miyazaki as a child. In 2008, when asked if there were any current things that inspired him, he gave Code Geass as a response. In 2011, Berserk was stated to be his favorite manga. Mashima speculated his desire to include strange and surreal mascot characters in his works, such as Happy, was influenced by Utsurun Desu author Sensha Yoshida. He also said he finds the visual contrast that such characters bring "beautiful". Following Toriyama's passing in March 2024, Mashima was among the many people to give his condolences to the late author, as it was Toriyama's work which helped him become a manga author.

For Rave, Mashima's inspiration was wanting to travel the world, while for Fairy Tail it was simply sitting in bars and partying with his friends, the community aspect, but is also about young people finding their calling. He stated that while he tries to consider both his own interests and the fans' on what will happen next in Fairy Tail, the fans take precedence.

Mashima has named his main characters after the seasons. In Rave, the main character is named Haru, which is Japanese for spring. In Fairy Tail, the main character is Natsu, which is the Japanese word for summer. In Monster Soul, the main character is Aki (Autumn), while both Monster Hunter Orage and Edens Zero have a character named Shiki, which is the Japanese word for seasons. He also named a character in Fighting Force Mixture Fuyu, which is Japanese for winter. Mashima said in an About.com interview that he did this because Japanese readers may not be familiar with western fantasy names. The main characters of both Rave and Fairy Tail do not have fathers, partly taken from Mashima's own experience of his father dying when he was young.

Mashima had six assistants in 2008 that worked in an 8,000 sq. feet area with seven desks, as well as a sofa and TV for video games. He revealed his schedule for Fairy Tail was script and storyboards on Monday, rough sketches the following day, and drawing and inking Wednesday through Friday. The weekend was for Monster Hunter; working on a quarter of the story each weekend and finishing by the end of the month. In 2011, he stated that he worked six days a week, for 17 hours a day. Mashima's assistants included Miki Yoshikawa, who has gone on to work on the romantic comedies Yankee-kun and Megane-chan (Flunk Punk Rumble) and Yamada-kun and the Seven Witches. In 2008, together they developed a crossover one-shot story called Fairy Megane where characters from Yankee-kun decide to find part-time jobs at the Fairy Tail guild. Other assistants who have gone on to work on projects of their own were Shin Mikuni, who published Spray King, and Ueda Yui, who published Tsukushi Biyori.

== Works ==
=== Manga ===
==== Serials ====
- Rave Master (Weekly Shōnen Magazine, 1999–2005, 35 volumes)
  - Plue's Dog Diaries (プルーの犬日記; 2002–2007)
- Monster Soul (Comic BomBom, 2005–2007, 2 volumes)
- Fairy Tail (Weekly Shōnen Magazine, 2006–2017, 63 volumes)
  - Fairy Tail Zero (Monthly Fairy Tail Magazine, 2014–2015, 1 volume)
  - Fairy Tail: 100 Years Quest (Magazine Pocket, 2018–present, 24 volumes) – writer/storyboarder
  - Fairy Tail Re:Fantasia (Weekly Shōnen Magazine, 2026)
- Monster Hunter Orage (Monthly Shōnen Rival, 2008–2009, 4 volumes)
- Edens Zero (Weekly Shōnen Magazine, 2018–2024, 33 volumes)
- Mashima Hero's (Weekly Shōnen Magazine, 2019, 1 volume)
- Gate of Nightmares (Weekly Shōnen Magazine, 2022, 2 volumes) – credited as original creator
- Dead Rock (Monthly Shōnen Magazine, 2023–present, 7 volumes)

==== Other manga ====
- Hiro Mashima's Playground (ましまえん, Mashima-en; 2003, 2 volumes) – collection of one-shots:
  - Bad Boys Song (バット ボーイズ ソング, Baddo Bōizu Songu; 1998)
  - Magician (マジシャン, Majishan; 1998)
  - MP (Magic Party) (MP（マジックパーティー）, Majikku Pātī; 2000)
  - Plue's Adventure II (プルーの冒険日記II, Purū Bōken Nikki II; 2002)
  - Fairy Tale (フェアリーテール, Fearī Tēru; 2002)
  - Xmas Hearts (クリスマス ハーツ, Kurisumasu Hātsu; 2003)
  - Cocona (ココナ, Kokona; 2003)
  - Fighting Force Mixture (混合戦隊ミクスチャー, Kongō Sentai Mikusuchā; 2003)
- Chameleon (Weekly Shonen Magazine, 2008) – one-shot remake of Atsushi Kase's title
- Nishikaze to Taiyō (西風と太陽; 2010)
- Hoshigami no Satsuki (星咬の皐月; 2014)
- Dragon Quest XI S: Tōzoku-tachi no Banka (ドラゴンクエストXI S 盗賊たちの挽歌; 2019)

=== Other works ===
- Sangokushi Taisen – Card illustration
- Respect Gundam – Contribution
- Bakemonogatari – End card – fifth story
- Gate of Nightmares – Character designs
- Rebecca to Kikai no Yōkan (レベッカと機械ノ洋館) – Game developer
- Farmagia – Character designs
- Marvel Tokon: Fighting Souls - Story artist - Fighting Avengers Story Episode
