= Fairy Tail =

Japanese manga series

- Cover of the first tankōbon volume, featuring Natsu Dragneel (upper right), Lucy Heartfilia (lower left), and Happy (upper left)
- Genre: Adventure; Fantasy
- Manga
- Written by: Hiro Mashima
- Published by: Kodansha
- English publisher: AUS: Penguin Books; NA: Del Rey Manga (former); Kodansha USA; UK: Turnaround
- Imprint: Shōnen Magazine Comics
- Magazine: Weekly Shōnen Magazine
- Original run: August 2, 2006 – July 26, 2017
- Volumes: 63
- Anime television series
- Fairy Tail (2009–2019)
- Anime films
- Fairy Tail the Movie: Phoenix Priestess (2012); Fairy Tail: Dragon Cry (2017)
- Related manga
- Fairy Tail Zero (2014–15); Fairy Tail: 100 Years Quest (2018–present)
- Video games
- Fairy Tail: Portable Guild (2010); Fairy Tail: Fight! Wizard Battle (2010); Fairy Tail: Portable Guild 2 (2011); Fairy Tail: Attack! Kardia Cathedral (2011); Fairy Tail: Zeref Awakens (2012); Fairy Tail: Hero's Journey (2018); Fairy Tail (2020); Fairy Tail 2 (2024)
- icon

Fairy Tail (stylized in all caps) is a Japanese manga series written and illustrated by Hiro Mashima. It was serialized in Kodansha's Weekly Shōnen Magazine from August 2006 to July 2017, with the individual chapters collected and published into 63 tankōbon volumes. The story follows the adventures of Natsu Dragneel, a member of the popular wizard (Note: According to the translation notes in the Del Rey edition of the manga's second volume, wizard is the translation of the Japanese word madōshi. However, the meaning of madōshi is similar to certain Japanese words that have been adopted by the English language, such as judo (the soft way) and kendo (the way of the sword). This translation took that as inspiration and translated the word madōshi as wizard. Madō is the way of magic, and madōshi are those who follow the way of magic. Although the word wizard is used, a Japanese reader would likely not think of traditional Western wizards, such as Merlin or Gandalf, but rather of martial artists.) guild Fairy Tail, as he searches the fictional world of Earth-land for the dragon Igneel.

The manga has been adapted into an anime series by A-1 Pictures, Dentsu Inc., Satelight, Bridge, and CloverWorks which aired on TV Tokyo from October 2009 to March 2013. A second series aired from April 2014 to March 2016. A third and final aired from October 2018 to September 2019. The series has also inspired numerous spin-off manga, including a prequel by Mashima, Fairy Tail Zero, and a sequel storyboarded by him, titled Fairy Tail: 100 Years Quest.

The manga series was originally licensed for an English release in North America by Del Rey Manga, which began releasing the individual volumes in March 2008 and ended its licensing with the 12th volume release in September 2010. In December 2010, Kodansha USA took over the North American release of the series. The manga was also licensed in the United Kingdom by Turnaround Publisher Services, and in Australia by Penguin Books Australia.

By February 2020, the Fairy Tail manga had over 72 million copies in print, making it one of the best-selling manga series of all time.

== Plot ==
The world of Earth-land is home to numerous guilds where wizards apply their magic for paid job requests. Natsu Dragneel, a Dragon Slayer wizard from the Fairy Tail guild, explores the Kingdom of Fiore in search of his missing adoptive father, the dragon Igneel. During his journey, he befriends a young celestial wizard named Lucy Heartfilia and invites her to join Fairy Tail. Natsu, Lucy, and the cat-like Exceed Happy form a team, which is gradually joined by other guild members: Gray Fullbuster, an ice wizard; Erza Scarlet, a magical knight; and Wendy Marvell and Carla, another Dragon Slayer and Exceed duo. The team embarks on numerous missions and misadventures, which include subduing criminals, illegal dark guilds, and ancient Etherious demons created by Zeref the Black Wizard.

Natsu and his companions eventually meet Zeref on Fairy Tail's sacred ground of Sirius Island. Cursed with immortality and deadly power for the past 400 years, Zeref wishes to die to atone for his atrocities. A battle over Zeref ensues between Fairy Tail and the dark guild Grimoire Heart, which attracts the attention of the evil black dragon Acnologia. The Fairy Tail wizards survive Acnologia's assault when the spirit of their guild's founder and Zeref's estranged lover, Mavis Vermillion, casts the defensive Fairy Sphere spell that places them into seven years of suspended animation. Following their victory in the Grand Magic Games tournament, Fairy Tail wages war against Tartaros, a dark guild of Etherious who aim to unseal a book believed to contain E.N.D., Zeref's ultimate demon. When Acnologia returns to annihilate both guilds, Igneel emerges from Natsu's body, having sealed himself within him in a bid to defeat Acnologia. However, Acnologia kills Igneel in front of a helpless Natsu, who departs on a training journey to avenge Igneel.

After Natsu returns one year later, Fiore is invaded by the Alvarez Empire, a military nation ruled by Zeref. Disillusioned with the conflicts performed in his name, Zeref decides to rewrite history and prevent his own rise to power; he intends to accomplish this by acquiring Fairy Heart, a wellspring of infinite magic power housed within Mavis's equally cursed body, which is preserved beneath Fairy Tail's guild hall. While battling Zeref, Natsu learns his own identity as both Zeref's younger brother and the true incarnation of E.N.D. (Etherious Natsu Dragneel), whom Zeref resurrected as a demon and sent 400 years through the time travel gate Eclipse in collusion with Igneel, all with the intention of being killed by Natsu. Natsu fails to do so, but manages to incapacitate Zeref to stop the drastic changes his actions would create, allowing Mavis to lift her and Zeref's curse by reciprocating his love, which kills them both.

Meanwhile, Fairy Tail and their allies detain Acnologia within a space-time rift created by the use of Eclipse. However, Acnologia consumes the rift's magic to escape, granting him godlike power, which he maintains by bringing the present Dragon Slayers into the rift with his disembodied spirit. Lucy and many other wizards across the continent immobilize Acnologia's body within Fairy Sphere, while Natsu accumulates the other Dragon Slayers' magic and destroys his spirit, killing Acnologia and freeing the Dragon Slayers. The following year, Natsu and his team depart on a century-old guild mission, continuing their adventures together.

== Production ==
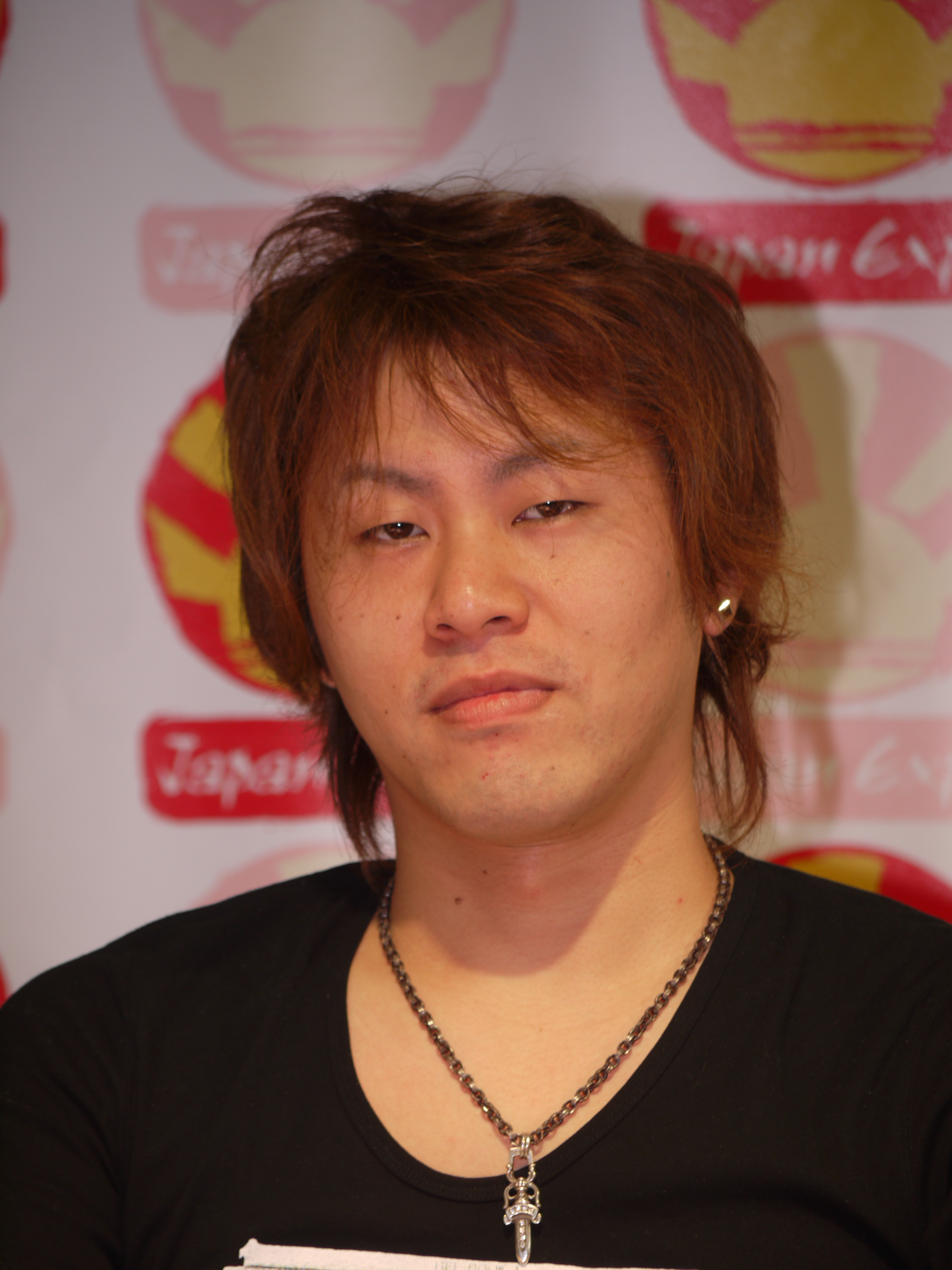
Author and illustrator Hiro Mashima

After finishing his previous work, Rave Master, Hiro Mashima found the story sentimental and sad at the same time, so he wanted the storyline of his next manga to have a "lot of fun." His inspiration for the series was sitting in bars and partying with his friends. He also described the series as being about young people finding their calling, such as a job. Mashima drew a one-shot titled Fairy Tale that was published in Magazine Fresh on September 3, 2002, which served as a pilot. Mashima's later concept for the serialized version involved Natsu as a fire-using member of a courier guild who carries various things on assignments. Mashima then came up with the idea to have different types of wizards hanging out in one place, and eventually coerced his editor into allowing him to change the concept to a wizard guild. The title was changed from "Tale" to "Tail" in reference to the tail of a fairy, which the author said may or may not prove to be a "pivotal point." Mashima stated that while he tried to consider both his own interests and the fans' on what would happen next in Fairy Tail, the fans' took precedence.

In the period between Rave Master and Fairy Tail, all but one of Mashima's assistants left, and the artist said making sure that the three new ones knew what to do was the hardest thing throughout the first year of serialization. Mashima described his weekly schedule for creating individual chapters of Fairy Tail in 2008: script and storyboards were written on Monday, rough sketches the following day, and drawing and inking were done Wednesday through Friday; time in the weekends was for Monster Hunter Orage, a monthly series Mashima was writing at the same time. He usually thought up new chapters while working on the current ones. Mashima had six assistants in 2008 that worked in an 8,000 square feet (740 m^{2}) area with seven desks, as well as a sofa and TV for video games. In 2011, he stated that he worked six days a week, for 17 hours a day.

For the characters of the series, Mashima drew people he had known in his life. In establishing the father-son relationship between Natsu and Igneel, Mashima cited his father's death when he was a child as an influence. He took Natsu's motion sickness from one of his friends, who gets sick when they take taxis together. When naming the character, the author thought western fantasy names would be unfamiliar to Japanese audiences, so he went with the Japanese name for summer; Natsu. Mashima based the reporter character Jason on American manga critic Jason Thompson, who interviewed him at 2008's San Diego Comic-Con, and another on an employee from Del Rey Manga, the original North American publisher of Fairy Tail. He based the humorous aspects of the series on his daily life and jokes his assistants would make.

== Media ==
=== Manga ===
Written and illustrated by Hiro Mashima, Fairy Tail was serialized in the manga anthology Weekly Shōnen Magazine from August 2, 2006, to July 26, 2017. The 545 individual chapters were collected and published into 63 tankōbon volumes by Kodansha between December 15, 2006, and November 17, 2017. An extra one-shot chapter was published in Weekly Shōnen Magazine on July 3, 2024.

In 2008, a special crossover one-shot between Fairy Tail and Miki Yoshikawa's Flunk Punk Rumble, titled Fairy Megane (FAIRYメガネ), was published in Weekly Shōnen Magazine. It was later included in Fairy Tail+, an official fanbook released on May 17, 2010. Another crossover with Mashima's first series Rave was published in 2011. A special issue of Weekly Shōnen Magazine, published on October 19, 2013, featured a small crossover between Fairy Tail and Nakaba Suzuki's The Seven Deadly Sins, where each artist drew a yonkoma (four-panel comic) of the other's series. An actual crossover chapter between these two was published in the magazine on December 25, 2013. A two-volume series called Fairy Tail S, which collects short stories by Mashima that were originally published in various Japanese magazines through the years, was released on September 16, 2016.

The series was licensed for an English-language release in North America by Del Rey Manga. The company released the first volume of the series on March 25, 2008, and continued until the release of the 12th volume in September 2010. After Del Rey Manga shut down, Kodansha USA acquired the license and began publishing Fairy Tail volumes in May 2011. They published the 63rd and final volume on January 23, 2018. Kodansha USA began publishing a larger omnibus version of the series in November 2015. Called Fairy Tail: Master's Edition, each installment corresponds to five regular-sized volumes. They published the first volume of Fairy Tail S: Tales from Fairy Tail on October 24, 2017.

The manga has also been licensed in other English-speaking countries. In the United Kingdom, the volumes were distributed by Turnaround Publisher Services. In Australia and New Zealand, the manga was distributed by Penguin Books Australia.

A miniseries to celebrate the 20th anniversary of Fairy Tail, titled Fairy Tail Re:Fantasia, was serialized in Weekly Shōnen Magazine from July 29 to September 30, 2026. Its chapters were collected in a single volume, released on October 16, 2026.

==== Spin-offs ====
Eight spin-off manga series based on Fairy Tail have been released. The first two series—Fairy Tail Zero by Mashima and Fairy Tail: Ice Trail by Yūsuke Shirato—began with the launch of a monthly magazine titled Monthly Fairy Tail Magazine on July 17, 2014, and ended in the magazine's thirteenth and final issue published on July 17, 2015. A third series, Fairy Tail Blue Mistral by Rui Watanabe, ran in Kodansha's shōjo manga magazine Nakayoshi from August 2, 2014, to December 1, 2015, while another, Fairy Girls by Boku, was released in Kodansha's Magazine Special from November 20, 2014, to August 20, 2015. Kyōta Shibano created a three-part meta-series titled Fairy Tail Gaiden, which was launched in Kodansha's free weekly Magazine Pocket mobile app. The series began in 2015 with Twin Dragons of Saber Tooth from July 30 to November 4, continued with Rhodonite from November 18, 2015, to March 30, 2016, and concluded with Lightning Gods in 2016 from May 4 to September 14. Fairy Tail: 100 Years Quest, a sequel to the original manga, began serialization on Magazine Pocket on July 25, 2018. It is storyboarded by Mashima and illustrated by Atsuo Ueda. Another spin-off, Fairy Tail: Happy's Heroic Adventure by Kenshirō Sakamoto, began on July 26 on the same app. On June 27, 2018, Mashima announced another spin-off manga for the app, Fairy Tail City Hero, written and illustrated by Ushio Andō.

All eight Fairy Tail spin-off manga, including all three installments of Gaiden, are licensed for English release by Kodansha USA.

=== Anime ===
An anime television series adaptation, produced by A-1 Pictures, Dentsu Entertainment, and Satelight, aired on TV Tokyo from October 12, 2009, to March 30, 2013.

A sequel, animated by A-1 Pictures and Bridge, was broadcast on TV Tokyo from April 5, 2014, to March 26, 2016.

A third and final series, animated by A-1 Pictures, CloverWorks, and Bridge, aired on TV Tokyo from October 7, 2018, to September 29, 2019.

=== Theatrical films ===
An anime film adaptation, Fairy Tail the Movie: Phoenix Priestess, premiered in Japan on August 18, 2012.

A second/sequel anime film, Fairy Tail: Dragon Cry, premiered in Japan on May 6, 2017.

=== Video games ===
An action video game for the PlayStation Portable, titled Fairy Tail: Portable Guild, (Note: フェアリーテイル ポータブルギルド, Fearī Teiru: Pōtaburu Girudo) was unveiled at the 2009 Tokyo Game Show. The game was developed by Konami and was released on June 3, 2010. Two sequels to Portable Guild have also been released for the PlayStation Portable—the first, subtitled Portable Guild 2, was released on March 10, 2011; the second, Fairy Tail: Zeref Awakens, (Note: フェアリーテイル ゼレフ覚醒, Fearī Teiru: Zerefu Kakusei) was released on March 22, 2012. The characters Natsu and Lucy also appeared as playable characters in the crossover video game Sunday VS Magazine: Shūketsu! Chōjō Daikessen for the PSP in 2009.

Two fighting games, Fairy Tail: Fight! Wizard Battle (Note: フェアリーテイル 激闘! 魔道士決戦, Fearī Teiru: Gekitō! Madōshi Kessen) and Fairy Tail: Attack! Kardia Cathedral, (Note: フェアリーテイル 激突! カルディア大聖堂, Fearī Teiru: Gekitotsu! Karudia Daiseidō) were released for the Nintendo DS on July 22, 2010, and April 21, 2011, respectively. In 2016, a browser game developed by GameSamba titled Fairy Tail: Hero's Journey was announced to be open for closed beta testing.

On September 5, 2019, it was announced that a role-playing video game titled Fairy Tail, developed by Gust and published by Koei Tecmo would be released for PlayStation 4, Nintendo Switch, and Steam on March 19, 2020, worldwide; the game was later delayed to June 25. The game was then delayed to July 30, 2020, in Japan and Europe, and in North America on July 31, 2020, due to the COVID-19 pandemic. A sequel, Fairy Tail 2, was announced for release in winter 2024.

At the end of 2021, Mashima approached Kodansha Game Creator's Lab to hold a contest looking for video game proposals based on Fairy Tail with the winning work receiving $132,300; $88,200 of which came from Mashima himself. The games had to be created for platforms such as Steam, iOS and Android, and Kodansha would distribute the winner, with the profits shared between Kodansha and the developers. In March 2023, it was announced that three titles were chosen as the winners. The roguelike deck-building game Fairy Tail: Dungeons was released via Steam on August 26, 2024. The sports action game Fairy Tail: Beach Volleyball Havoc followed on September 16, 2024. Details on the third, Fairy Tail: Birth of Magic, will be revealed at a later date.

== Reception ==
By February 2020, the Fairy Tail manga had 72 million collected volumes in circulation. In France, the series had sold over 7.7 million copies by 2018. According to Oricon, Fairy Tail was the eighth best-selling manga series in Japan for 2009, fourth best in 2010 and 2011, fifth best of 2012, dropped to ninth in 2013, to seventeenth in 2014, and was fifteenth in 2015. The fifth volume of Fairy Tail was ranked seventh in a list of the top ten manga, and the series once again placed seventh after the release of the sixth volume. About.com's Deb Aoki listed Fairy Tail as the Best New Shōnen Manga of 2008. Fairy Tail won Best Manga Series of 2008 at the 2009 Anime & Manga Grand Prix held by French magazine AnimeLand. It also won the 2009 Kodansha Manga Award for shōnen manga. At the 2009 Industry Awards for the Society for the Promotion of Japanese Animation, the organizers of Anime Expo, Fairy Tail was named Best Comedy Manga. It also won Best Shōnen Manga at the 2009 Japan Expo Awards. Volume 9 of the manga was nominated in the Youth Selection category at the 2010 Angoulême International Comics Festival. On TV Asahi's Manga Sōsenkyo 2021 poll, in which 150,000 people voted for their top 100 manga series, Fairy Tail ranked 65th.

Reviewing the first volume, Carl Kimlinger of Anime News Network (ANN) felt Fairy Tail followed standard shōnen action manga tropes, writing "the mix of goofy humor, face-crushing action, and teary-eyed sap is so calculated as to be mechanical." Carlo Santos, also of Anime News Network, agreed in his review of volume three; having positive views towards the art, particularly the action scenes, but citing a lack of story and character development. By volume 12 Santos suggested that Mashima's true talent lies in "taking the most standard, predictable aspects of the genre and somehow still weaving it into a fun, fist-pumping adventure." Reviewing the first 11 volumes, ANN's Rebecca Silverman wrote that while the art in the early arcs of Fairy Tail may not be its best, the stories arguably are. She also praised Lucy and Erza as strong female characters. Her colleague Faye Hopper was more critical, calling the manga a "somewhat mediocre shounen series [that] pushes enough buttons" so as to make her want to read more.

Kimlinger, Silverman, and A.E. Sparrow of IGN all felt Mashima's artwork had strong similarities to Eiichiro Oda's in One Piece. While Sparrow used the comparison as a compliment and said it had enough unique qualities of its own, Kimlinger went so far as to say it makes it difficult to appreciate Mashima's "undeniable technical skill."

== Notes ==
General

Translations
