= Lucy Heartfilia =

Fictional character from Fairy Tail

- Fairy Tail character
- Lucy Heartfilia as drawn by Hiro Mashima
- First appearance: Fairy Tail chapter 1: The Fairy's Tail (2006)
- Created by: Hiro Mashima
- Voiced by: Japanese Aya Hirano; English Cherami Leigh

In-universe information
- Family: Jude Heartfilia (father); Layla Heartfilia (mother)
- Relatives: Anna Heartfilia (ancestor)
- Guild: Fairy Tail
- Magic: Celestial Spirit Magic

Lucy Heartfilia (Japanese: ルーシィ・ハートフィリア, Hepburn: Rūshii Hātofiria) is a fictional character from Hiro Mashima's manga series Fairy Tail. Lucy first makes her debut in Fairy Tail chapter #1, "The Fairy's Tail", (Note: 妖精の尻尾(フェアリーテイル), Fearī Teiru) originally published in Japan's Weekly Shōnen Magazine on August 2, 2006, as a young wizard and aspiring novelist who joins the titular guild because of its popularity, despite its members' tendency to cause unintentional property damage. As a Celestial Wizard, (Note: 星霊魔導士, seirei madōshi) Lucy uses magical objects known as Gatekeys (Note: 門(ゲート)の鍵, Gēto no Kagi) to summon celestial spirits, beings from another world that possess various abilities, such as powerful zodiac spirits that she summons with rare golden keys. Lucy appears in most Fairy Tail media, including both feature films, all original video animations (OVAs), light novels and video games. She is voiced by Aya Hirano in Japanese, while Cherami Leigh voices her in the English dub.

Mashima stated that Lucy was designed with a serious personality and represents his artistic side. Lucy's character has received a mixed critical response. Journalists have praised some of her fight scenes and have regarded her as sympathetic, but they have found her early series development lacking and have generally criticized her relationship with the celestial spirits. Lucy has placed high in popularity polls, and many different pieces of merchandise related to her have been released, such as action figures.

== Creation and conception ==
Lucy Heartfilia was one of the first characters Hiro Mashima created during the development of Fairy Tail. In her earliest concept, Mashima designed an outfit with a ruffled dress, high heels, and curled pigtails. Three alternative hairstyles included a bun, a short haircut covering her right eye, and a side ponytail similar to the one Mashima ultimately picked for her. Lucy's design was eventually changed to a sleeveless shirt, a short skirt, and brown knee-high heeled boots. Mashima's original idea for Lucy's magic involved using cards in combat, which he changed to keys because of the repeated use of weaponized cards in other media. Mashima based Lucy's first name on the song "Lucy in the Sky with Diamonds" recorded by the Beatles.

When asked about his resemblance to his characters, Mashima stated that he is sometimes serious like Lucy. He further said that Lucy represents the artistic side of himself. He confirmed that Lucy is one of his favorite characters and mentioned that he wished to focus on her while developing the story. Mashima also commented that Lucy had been designed to always give the best of herself, and he felt that this characteristic gained the support of the fans. Mashima listed Lucy as one of the three Fairy Tail characters he would prefer to be on a team with.

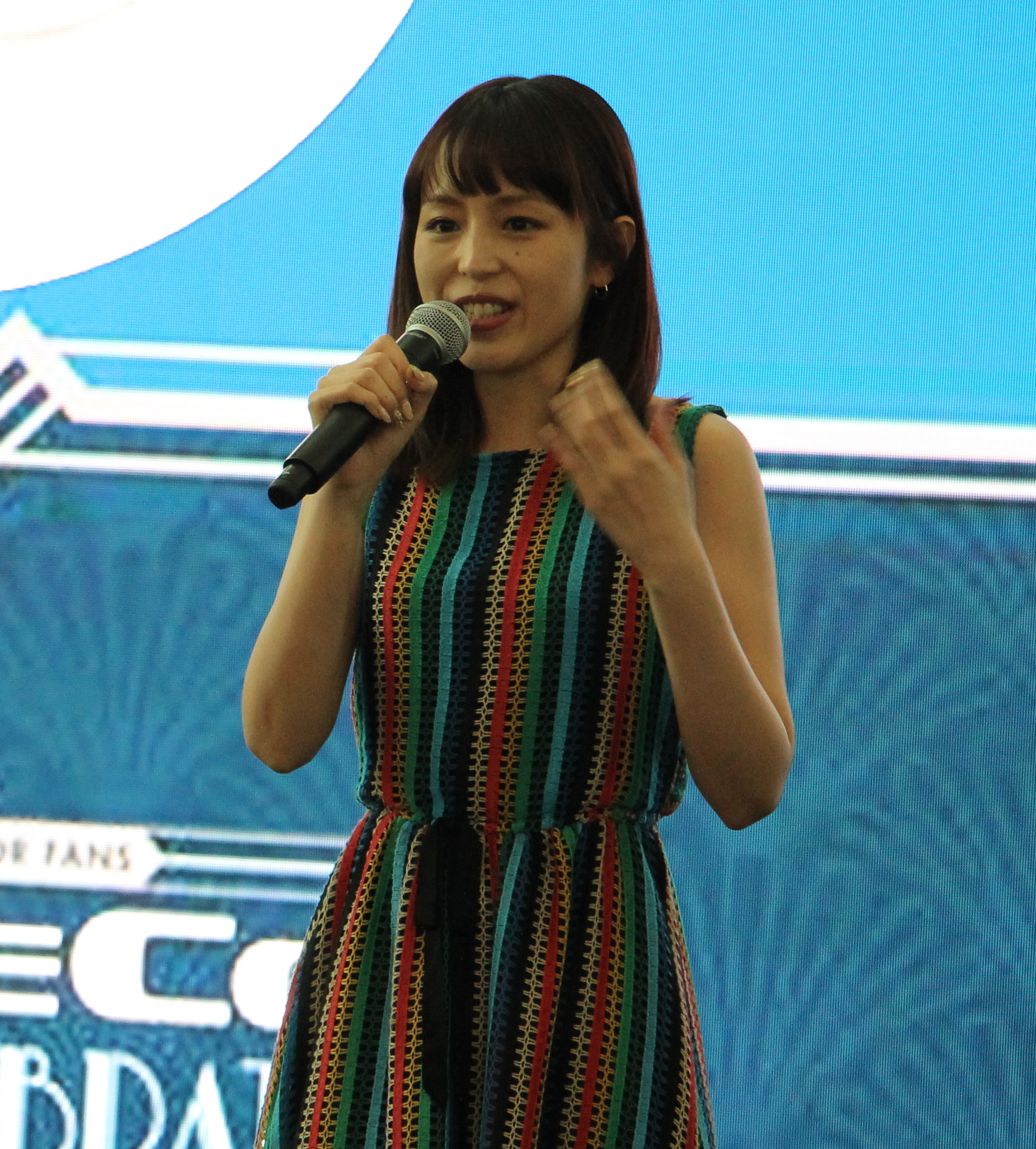
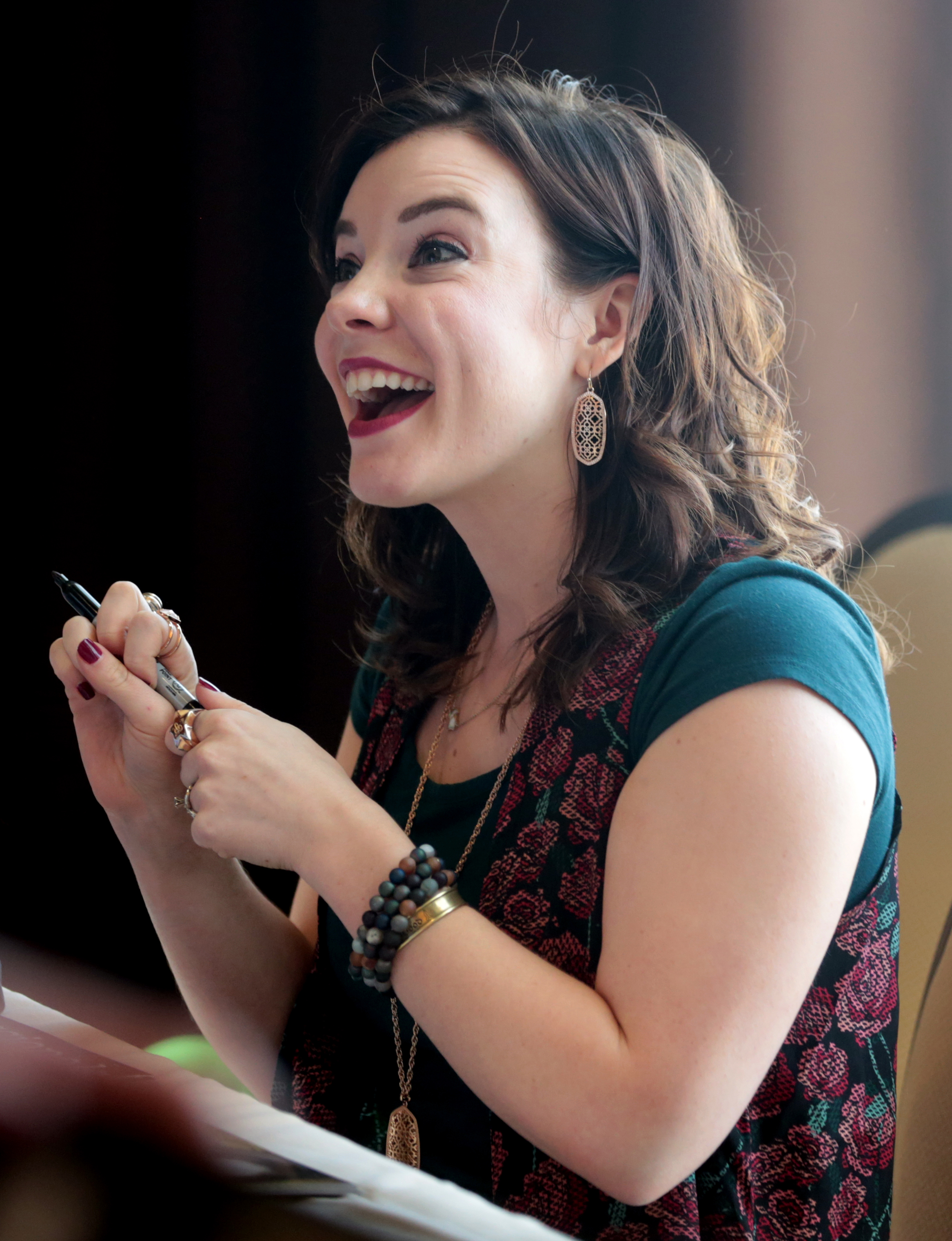
Lucy is voiced by Aya Hirano (left) in Japanese and by Cherami Leigh (right) in English.

Regarding the anime adaptation of the series, voice actress Aya Hirano, who plays Lucy in Japanese, stated that Lucy's potential romantic relationships were popular with fans, and she wondered whether Lucy would form a couple with protagonist Natsu Dragneel in the end. She further said that Mashima really enjoyed a scene from Fairy Tail the Movie: Phoenix Priestess, where Lucy is embraced by Natsu. Hirano also mentioned that Lucy's separation from the spirit Aquarius made her cry during the recording session, adding that Lucy is a character she can develop along with. Cherami Leigh voices Lucy in the English dub.

== Appearances ==
=== In Fairy Tail ===
Lucy first appears in Fairy Tail chapter #1, "The Fairy's Tail", which was originally released on August 2, 2006, in Japan's Weekly Shōnen Magazine. She is introduced as the seventeen-year-old daughter of business tycoon Jude Heartfilia and celestial wizard Layla Heartfilia. Following Layla's death and her own later estrangement from Jude, Lucy leaves her home to join the Fairy Tail guild, which she admires in spite of its members' inclination to cause unintended property damage. She is rescued from a criminal by members Natsu Dragneel, a fire wizard and Dragon Slayer, and Happy, his Exceed companion, who invite her into the guild after learning of her goal. Lucy partners with the two to pay the rent for her house in Magnolia, the city where Fairy Tail is located. The three later form a permanent team with ice wizard Gray Fullbuster and armor wizard Erza Scarlet, becoming what their guildmates regard as Fairy Tail's most powerful team despite Lucy's inexperience. Shortly into her membership, Lucy is abducted by Phantom Lord, a rival guild contacted by Jude with the intent to bring Lucy home for an arranged marriage, leading to a guild war that leaves the Fairy Tail guildhall demolished. Lucy renounces her family ties with Jude after Phantom Lord's defeat, although the two begin to mend their relationship after Jude goes bankrupt.

While Lucy is present on Sirius Island for Fairy Tail's S-Class promotional exam, former guild master Mavis Vermillion places the island in suspended animation within the defensive spell Fairy Sphere to protect the guild from the dragon Acnologia; Lucy regains her love for Jude after discovering his death from overwork shortly upon her release seven years later. During the Kingdom of Fiore's annual Grand Magic Games tournament, Lucy's future self uses the magical time travel gate Eclipse to return to the present and warn her friends of an impending assault conducted by dragons from the past, later dying while shielding her present self from fellow time traveler Rogue Cheney's attack. Lucy is then able to prevent the crisis by closing Eclipse using all twelve zodiac spirits belonging to her and fellow celestial wizard Yukino Agria. Later, when her guild is incapacitated by the dark guild Tartaros, Lucy is forced to destroy the key of her spirit Aquarius to temporarily summon the Celestial Spirit King, who saves her friends.

One year after Fairy Tail dissolves, Lucy reunites with Natsu and Happy, who help her reform the guild. She and the rest of Fairy Tail then participate in a war against the Alvarez Empire, which is led by Natsu's brother, the dark wizard Zeref. After a temporary reunion between Lucy and Aquarius, Lucy resolves to find the spirit's reforged key after the war to permanently reunite with her. Later, when Lucy discovers that Natsu is a demon called "Etherious Natsu Dragneel" (E.N.D.) who will die if Zeref is killed, she edits the book containing E.N.D.'s soul to sever Natsu's connection to the book, allowing him to survive his battle with Zeref. Following this, Lucy harnesses the magic of wizards across the continent to imprison Acnologia within Fairy Sphere, while the dragon's spiritual form is destroyed by Natsu, killing Acnologia. One year later, Lucy publishes an award-winning debut novel based on her adventures in the guild, after which she and her team embark on a "century quest", a guild mission that has never been accomplished in under 100 years.

=== In other media ===
Lucy is present in both Fairy Tail films. In first movie Phoenix Priestess (2012), Lucy befriends a girl called Éclair and helps her reach her destination. Lucy also makes an appearance in the one-shot prologue manga created by Hiro Mashima for this film and in its animated adaptation. In second movie/sequel Dragon Cry (2017), Lucy and other Fairy Tail members are assigned by the king of Fiore to bring back the stolen Dragon Cry staff.

Lucy is also a character in all nine Fairy Tail original video animations (OVAs). In the first OVA, she visits Fairy Hills, Fairy Tail's dormitory for girls; in the second, Lucy is portrayed as an academy student; in the third, she is sent to the past by a magical book; in the fourth, she attends a training camp to prepare for the Grand Magic Games; in the fifth, Lucy goes to a water park to have fun and relax; the sixth is a crossover OVA of the Fairy Tail series and Hiro Mashima's Rave Master series, in which Lucy and Rave Master heroine Elie search for Natsu and Rave Master protagonist Haru Glory, respectively; in the seventh, Lucy takes part in a penalty game; in the eighth, she and other guild members try to make Mavis Vermillion feel better; and in the ninth, the Fairy Tail members gather together in Lucy's house to celebrate Christmas. She also appears in every light novel based on the series, such as one in which her role is inspired by the character Alice from the Alice in Wonderland novel, and one where the Fairy Tail guild members are depicted as samurais. Lucy is also present in the sequel to the Fairy Tail manga, Fairy Tail: 100 Years Quest, which directly continues the original story. She appears in several spin-offs from the original series as well, including one regarding the female Fairy Tail members.

Lucy is a playable character in several Fairy Tail video games, such as the PlayStation Portable action video games developed by Konami Fairy Tail: Portable Guild (2010), Fairy Tail: Portable Guild 2 (2011), and Fairy Tail: Zeref Awakens (2012). She appears in the multi-platform role-playing video game developed by Gust Co. Ltd. as well. Lucy is also present alongside Natsu in the crossover video game Sunday vs Magazine: Shūketsu! Chōjō Daikessen (2009).

== Powers and abilities ==
Lucy is a Celestial Wizard, who uses magical Gatekeys to summon otherworldly beings called celestial spirits. Initially, Lucy possesses three gold keys that summon powerful zodiac spirits—Aquarius, Cancer, and Taurus—the former two of which are inherited from her deceased mother, Layla. Over the course of the story, Lucy contracts ten of the twelve zodiac spirits, including her guildmate and disgraced spirit Loke after persuading the Celestial Spirit King to rescind his exile from the spirit world. Her combat ability increases when she masters the powerful celestial spell Urano Metoria (Note: ウラノ・メトリア, Urano Metoria) and, during the year after Fairy Tail dissolves, learns how to magically change into Star Dresses (Note: 星霊衣(スタードレス), Sutā Doresu) that grant her personal access to her spirits' powers. Besides her magic, Lucy demonstrates proficiency with a whip with a heart-shaped extremity. After losing her initial whip, she receives a replacement with the extendable energy whip Fleuve d'étoiles. (Note: 星の大河(エトワールフルーグ), Etowāru Furūgu; French for "River of Stars")

== Reception ==
=== Critical response ===
Critical reception of Lucy's character has been mixed. Critics have commented on her characterization in the manga series. While reviewing the manga, Carl Kimlinger of Anime News Network (ANN) regarded Lucy's relationship with her celestial spirits as "awful". He considered Lucy "sympathetic", despite stating that her character development was lacking. Rebecca Silverman of the same website characterized Lucy as "kind of annoying". Nevertheless, the writer described Lucy's confrontation with one of Dragon Slayer Laxus Dreyar's allies as "breathtaking"; Silverman elaborated on this aspect by saying this battle had "a combination of emotion, intellect, and good old fashioned brawling to maximize the reader's involvement in the story", adding that no other major fight in the series contained the same mixture of elements. Silverman further wrote that Dragon Slayer Wendy Marvell took over Lucy's role as the main female character of the story for a limited amount of time. The writer enjoyed the "reaffirmation of Lucy's bond with her spirits" and stated that Lucy's role in her team-up with Natsu against a member of the dark guild Grimoire Heart was a bizarre yet major one. A. E. Sparrow of IGN compared the way Lucy was drawn with how the characters Nami and Vivi were portrayed by manga artist Eiichiro Oda in the One Piece series. The reviewer regarded Lucy's ability to summon celestial spirits as "great" and thought it would be fun to see what other keys she could collect in the future. Dale North of Japanator felt that Lucy had the widest variety of facial expressions among the Fairy Tail characters and described her as "cute". Richard Gutierrez of The Fandom Post said that Lucy had become a stronger person following Fairy Tail's fight against the Phantom Lord guild.

Journalists have also analyzed Lucy's character based on her portrayal in the animated adaptation of the series and feature films. While reviewing the anime, Carlo Santos of ANN praised Cherami Leigh's role as Lucy. Carl Kimlinger wrote that Aya Hirano's "dark timbre and self-conscious delivery" were a "poor fit for sunny Lucy", but he enjoyed Leigh's interpretation of Lucy. While the reviewer described Lucy's partnership with Natsu and Happy as odd, he thought of their teamwork as the main part of the story's "action ensemble". Crystalyn Hodgkins of ANN believed Leigh was suitable for Lucy's voice, stating that her performance was "full of enthusiasm". Rebecca Silverman viewed Lucy's family relationships as the central aspect of her character, and she said the relationship between Lucy and her father was handled better in the anime compared to the manga. The writer thought the introduction of Lucy's future self represented an important part of her story. Silverman mentioned that the anime missed an opportunity to explore Lucy's character further in the filler storyline where the celestial spirits started a rebellion against her, describing the emphasis on her relation with the spirit Virgo as unnecessary; she also expressed disappointment that Lucy's interactions with Loke and Aquarius, both of whom Silverman considered "far more integral to [Lucy's] character", were comparatively underplayed. Matt Kamen of Neo admired Lucy's ability to summon spirits, and Chris Beveridge of The Fandom Post referred to Lucy as one of his favorite Fairy Tail characters. Kevin Leathers of UK Anime Network regarded Lucy as "the representation of the viewer" and thought her contribution to the series was "decent". While reviewing Fairy Tail the Movie: Phoenix Priestess, Kimlinger mentioned that there were "little spikes of melancholy" in the story when the plot focused on Lucy; he praised Hirano's "emotional intensity" in the film and stated that Leigh's performance sounded "childish in comparison". Reviewing Fairy Tail: Dragon Cry, Silverman said Lucy fell into the damsel in distress trope since she was often captured and seemed "helpless", finding this disappointing as it had been shown in previous story arcs that Lucy can handle herself; nonetheless, the writer enjoyed the scene in which Lucy started wearing celestial clothing, and she described it as "beautifully done".

=== Popularity and merchandise ===
In a popularity poll published in the 26th issue of Weekly Shōnen Magazine, Lucy ranked first with a total of 8987 votes. Merchandise based on Lucy has been released, including action figures. Badges inspired by her have been produced, and necklaces based on her have been created as well.
