= List of Fairy Tail characters =

A selection of Fairy Tail's main and supporting characters, including members of the titular guild.

The Fairy Tail manga and anime series features an extensive cast of characters created by Hiro Mashima. The series takes place primarily in the Kingdom of Fiore, a country in the fictional universe Earth-land, where several of its residents perform various forms of magic. Those who practice magic as a profession, referred to as wizards (魔導士, madōshi),^{[vol. 2:193]} join guilds where they share information and do paid jobs for clients. The series' storyline follows a group of wizards from the rambunctious titular guild.

The main protagonists are Natsu Dragneel, a longtime Fairy Tail wizard with the powers of a dragon, and Lucy Heartfilia, a celestial wizard who joins the guild at the series' outset. In the early part of the series, they form a team including: Happy, a flying cat and best friend of Natsu; Gray Fullbuster, an ice wizard; and Erza Scarlet, a knight who specializes in using various magic weapons and armors. Throughout the series, Natsu and Lucy interact with and befriend other wizards and guilds in Fiore. They also encounter various antagonists from illegal "dark" guilds, and Zeref, an ancient wizard who is the series' main antagonist.

When creating the series, Mashima was influenced by Akira Toriyama, J.R.R. Tolkien and Yudetamago and based the guild on a local bar. He also used people as references in designing other characters. The characters have been well-received overall.

== Creation and conception ==
When Hiro Mashima was creating Fairy Tail, he cited Akira Toriyama, J. R. R. Tolkien, and Yudetamago as influences on his work. He based the titular guild on a local bar he was visiting at the time. He based Natsu Dragneel on his early years as a junior high school student. Natsu's motion sickness is based on one of his friends, who gets sick when they take taxis together. He has said that his father's death influenced the relationship between Natsu and the dragon Igneel.

Del Rey Manga, the original North American publisher of Fairy Tail, explained that Mashima provided them with official English spellings for "just about all" the characters in the series.^{[vol. 2:translation notes]} When Funimation Entertainment acquired the license to release the Fairy Tail anime in North America, Mashima was worried about actor Todd Haberkorn's voice since the Natsu character did a lot of yelling throughout the series. Tyler Walker, the voice director for Funimation's adaptation, revealed that there was a "Fairy Tail tea" that the voice actors drank after each recording session to protect their voices. Walker likens Fairy Tail to the Scooby-Doo franchise: "it's got a core group of characters, with one talking animal, sometimes two...they travel, it's episodic...you know, we've seen this kind of thing before with the core group that's affiliated in some way going through adventure after adventure".

== Fairy Tail ==
The series focuses on the titular guild, Fairy Tail (妖精の尻尾(フェアリーテイル), Fearī Teiru), with the main protagonists constituting what their fellow members regard to be the guild's most powerful team because of their high magical strength and teamwork.^{[ch. 22]} It initially consists of Lucy Heartfilia, Natsu Dragneel, and Happy at the suggestion of the celestial spirit Plue shortly after Lucy's induction into the guild,^{[ch. 4]} and later expands to include Gray Fullbuster and Erza Scarlet after several shared missions together.^{[ch. 69]} Wendy Marvell and Carla are also considered to be members of the team.

=== Team Natsu ===
==== Natsu Dragneel ====
Voiced by: Tetsuya Kakihara, MAKO (child) (Japanese); Todd Haberkorn, Luci Christian (young) (English)

Natsu Dragneel (ナツ・ドラグニル, Natsu Doraguniru) is the main pink-haired protagonist of the series. He is raised from a young age by the dragon Igneel to become a Dragon Slayer (滅竜魔導士(ドラゴンスレイヤー), Doragon Sureiyā), a wizard with dragon-like physiology whose powers are designed to combat dragons. Using his Fire Dragon Slayer Magic (火の滅竜魔法, Hi no Metsurū Mahō), Natsu is immune to flames and capable of consuming them to fuel his attacks, which include breathing fire and igniting any part of his body for use when striking; however, he suffers from motion sickness when he is in a vehicle of any sort.^{[ch. 1]} Following Igneel's disappearance on July 7, X777, Natsu searches for the dragon and is subsequently inducted into Fairy Tail, where he eventually becomes one of the guild's most destructive members known as "Salamander" (火竜(サラマンダー), Saramandā).^{[ch. 2]} Eventually, it is revealed that Natsu is a demon known as "Etherious Natsu Dragneel" (E.N.D.) who was sent 400 years from the past by his brother, Zeref Dragneel, as part of a larger conspiracy to kill both Zeref and the evil dragon Acnologia.^{[ch. 465]}

==== Lucy Heartfilia ====
Voiced by: Aya Hirano (Japanese); Cherami Leigh (English)

Lucy Heartfilia (ルーシィ・ハートフィリア, Rūshii Hātofiria) is the series' main female protagonist. She is the seventeen-year-old daughter of the wealthy Heartfilia family who embarks on a journey to join Fairy Tail, which she fulfills after Natsu Dragneel rescues her from a slave trader posing as a Fairy Tail member under his own moniker of "Salamander".^{[ch. 1]} She performs paid guild missions together with Natsu and Happy to fund her rented house in Magnolia,^{[ch. 4]} and is often exasperated when her teammates inadvertently reduce their reward due to their destructive antics.^{[ch. 70]} She is also an aspiring novelist who eventually publishes her debut novel based on her experiences at the guild at the end of the series.^{[ch. 9, 545]} As a celestial wizard (星霊魔導士, seirei madōshi), she uses magical keys that summon celestial spirits, collecting ten out of twelve rare golden keys that summon the powerful zodiac spirits as the series progresses. She is also proficient in battling alongside her spirits with a whip,^{[ch. 115]} and eventually gains the ability to don magical Star Dresses (星霊衣(スタードレス), Sutā Doresu) that give her direct access to her zodiac spirits' powers.^{[ch. 422]}

==== Happy ====
Voiced by: Rie Kugimiya (Japanese); Tia Ballard (English)

Happy (ハッピー, Happī) is a blue furred six-year-old anthropomorphic cat who is Natsu Dragneel's best friend and only traveling companion at the start of the series.^{[ch. 1]} Using a magic ability called Aera (翼(エーラ), Ēra), Happy can transform into a winged cat and fly at great speeds.^{[ch. 1, 17]} He uses this form to carry Natsu in the air, and is the only one Natsu rides without succumbing to motion sickness.^{[ch. 3]} Before the beginning of the series, Happy is hatched from an egg found by Natsu and Lisanna Strauss, who name him "Happy" after his birth quells an argument the rest of the guild were having.^{[vol. 15:omake]} Eventually, Happy discovers his origins as an Exceed from Edolas,^{[ch. 178]} where he is separated from his parents Lucky (ラッキー, Rakkī) and Marl (マール, Māru) before birth as part of their queen's plan to evacuate 100 Exceed children to Earth-land before their kingdom's destruction.^{[ch. 177, 198]}

==== Gray Fullbuster ====
Voiced by: Yuichi Nakamura, Eri Kitamura (child) (Japanese); Newton Pittman, Ryan Reynolds (child) (English)

Gray Fullbuster (グレイ・フルバスター, Gurei Furubasutā) is an eighteen-year-old ice wizard who is a brothers in arms with Natsu because of their same personalities and magical elements.^{[ch. 10]} Orphaned by the Etherious Deliora (デリオラ, Deriora) at age eight, Gray is tutored by Ur to use Ice Make (氷の造形魔法(アイスメイク), Aisu Meiku), which instantly produces ice in the form of any weapon or object he imagines;^{[ch. 21]} during his training to withstand cold temperatures, he also gains the habit of subconsciously stripping his clothes, something that Mashima based on a personal habit of his own. He joins Fairy Tail after Ur sacrifices herself to save his life when he recklessly attempts to kill Deliora. Later in the series, Gray inherits Ice Demon Slayer Magic (氷の滅悪魔法, Kōri no Metsuaku Mahō) from his reanimated father, Silver, becoming a Demon Slayer (滅悪魔導士(デビルスレイヤー), Debiru Sureiyā; lit. "Devil Slayer") to carry out Silver's will to destroy E.N.D. The corruptive influence of his demonic powers compels Gray to irrationally fight Natsu upon discovering his identity as E.N.D.,^{[ch. 449, 450]} but he ultimately uses his powers to help strip Natsu of his identity as an Etherious so he may live normally as a human.^{[ch. 538]}

==== Erza Scarlet ====
Voiced by: Sayaka Ohara, Aiko Ninomiya (baby) (Japanese); Colleen Clinkenbeard (English)

Erza Scarlet (エルザ・スカーレット, Eruza Sukāretto) is a nineteen-year-old red-haired S-Class swordswoman of Fairy Tail who is nicknamed "Titania" (妖精女王(ティターニア), Titānia) for her notoriety as the guild's most powerful female wizard,^{[ch. 14]} referencing the Fairy Queen from A Midsummer Night's Dream.^{[vol. 3:192]} She uses magic called "The Knight" (騎士(ザ・ナイト), Za Naito) to instantaneously "requip" (換装, kansō)—exchange and equip—various weapons and armors that alter her already tremendous strength and magic ability.^{[ch. 14]} Left at infancy by her mother, Irene Belserion,^{[ch. 519]} Erza is enslaved at the Tower of Heaven and befriends Jellal Fernandes, who gives her the surname "Scarlet" after her red hair.^{[ch. 77, 163]} She first activates her magic power while leading a slave revolt, only to be betrayed by a brainwashed Jellal and forced to escape from the tower alone.^{[ch. 81, 82]} Her experiences lead her to join Fairy Tail and become a serious-minded but compassionate disciplinarian who temporarily becomes the guild's seventh master in Makarov Dreyar's absence when the guild is reformed one year after Tartaros's demise. Over the course of Fairy Tail, Erza grows fond of her friends during their adventures.^{[ch. 104, 438]}

The character is named after Eru from Mashima's one-shot manga Fairy Tale, which served as a pilot for Fairy Tail.^{[vol. 2:190]} Mashima initially designed her to only shed tears from one eye due to a defect with her artificial eye, but he eventually abandoned this aspect after accidentally drawing some scenes where Erza has tears flowing from both eyes.^{[vol. 12:199]} He also said that he often forgets what Erza's armor looks like, and changes the design every time she appears.^{[vol. 18:187]}

==== Wendy Marvell ====
Voiced by: Satomi Satō (Japanese); Brittney Karbowski (English)

Wendy Marvell (ウェンディ・マーベル, Wendi Māberu) is a blue-haired young Dragon Slayer adopted and trained by the dragon Grandeeney (グランディーネ, Gurandīne; also "Grandine") to perform Sky Dragon Slayer Magic (天空の滅竜魔法, Tenkū no Metsuryū Mahō), which draws power from clean air to heal others' injuries and ailments,^{[ch. 135]} and can temporarily relieve Dragon Slayers' motion sickness.^{[ch. 144]} Together with Natsu, she is part of a group of Dragon Slayers sent 400 years from the past through Eclipse as children to combat Acnologia.^{[ch. 465]} When the group is scattered upon arrival, Wendy travels the world with Mystogan until he leaves her at the Cait Shelter (化猫の宿(ケット・シェルター), Ketto Sherutā) guild, where she comes to be known as the "Sky Dragon" (天竜, Tenryū) and "Priestess of the Sky" (天空の巫女, Tenkū no Miko).^{[ch. 135]} Seven years later, Wendy represents her guild in an alliance with Fairy Tail, Blue Pegasus, and Lamia Scale against the dark guild Oración Seis.^{[ch. 132]} After the Seis are defeated, Wendy discovers her guild's true nature as an illusion created by their master, the elderly spirit Robaul (ローバウル, Rōbauru), to care for her; she is then left to join Fairy Tail after her old guild vanishes.^{[ch. 164]} Wendy comes to admire Natsu as an older brother figure,^{[ch. 423]} inspiring her to use her magic's combative functions, which include manipulating wind and augmenting her and her allies' abilities through enchantment.^{[ch. 376]}

Mashima designed Wendy to be a 12-year-old girl after one of his staff members commented that young girls "just don't appear" in the series, and noted the character's popularity among his associates.^{[vol. 16:185]} His original concept for her was that of a "Water Dragon" based on the Japanese name for Wednesday (水曜日, Suiyōbi; lit. 'Water Day'), which Mashima derived her name from.^{[vol. 27:184]}

==== Carla ====
Voiced by: Yui Horie (Japanese); Jad Saxton (English)

Carla is a white-furred six-year-old Exceed who acts as Wendy Marvell's partner and caretaker;^{[ch. 133, 145]} her name is Charles (シャルル, Sharuru) in Japanese, spelled "Charle" in Funimation subtitles, which was changed to "Carla" in countries where readers would interpret "Charles" as a male name.^{[vol. 27:184]} Years before the series' present, she is evacuated to Earth-land as an egg along with Happy and 98 other unborn Exceed when her mother, the Exceed queen Chagot, has a premonition of their kingdom's destruction; to prevent a panic, the queen conceals the evacuation as a mission to kill Dragon Slayers.^{[ch. 198]} Carla is born with the unconscious power of precognition inherited from her mother, which causes her to misinterpret visions of Chagot's ruse as her real mission;^{[ch. 198]} despite this, Carla decides to protect Wendy. Although annoyed with Happy's obliviousness to their mission, Carla reconsiders after he ignores the Exceeds' orders.^{[ch. 165, 169 , 177]} Eventually, after realizing her precognitive ability, Carla practices to consciously control her visions and, during her one-year membership with Lamia Scale, assumes a humanoid form to further hone her powers.^{[ch. 198, 201, 421]}

=== Guild masters ===
==== Mavis Vermillion ====
Voiced by: Mamiko Noto (Japanese); Leah Clark (English)

Mavis Vermillion (メイビス・ヴァーミリオン, Meibisu Vāmirion) is the first and founding master of Fairy Tail,^{[ch. 203]} nicknamed the "Fairy Strategist" (妖精軍師, Yōsei Gunshi) as a child prodigy with vast military and illusory skill.^{[ch. 255]} Mavis also has knowledge of the Three Great Fairy Magics (妖精三大魔法, Yōsei San Dai Mahō), a trinity of spells that can only be used by members of her guild;^{[ch. 233]} besides Fairy Law, these spells include Fairy Glitter (妖精の輝き(フェアリーグリッター), Fearī Gurittā), an attack that eradicates any enemy,^{[ch. 232]} and Fairy Sphere (妖精の球(フェアリースフィア), Fearī Sufia), an impenetrable force field that suspends time for those inside.^{[ch. 255]} She is later revealed to possess the same immortality and life-stealing curse as series antagonist Zeref Dragneel, her former friend and lover, which also halts her outward physical maturity when she is first afflicted at thirteen years of age,^{[ch. 449]} but retains her physiology as an adult woman in later life.^{[ch. 526]}

Raised on Sirius Island by a harsh guild master who takes her shoes away, Mavis develops the habit of walking barefoot. At age 13, she encounters a group of treasure hunters who later become her co-founders of Fairy Tail. While accompanying them on a journey to recover a stolen artifact, Mavis befriends a wandering Zeref, who teaches her a forbidden prototype of Fairy Law that triggers her curse when she performs the spell to save her friends' lives.^{[ch. 449]} Eleven years later, Mavis continues to empathize with Zeref and falls in love with him, causing Zeref's curse to unwittingly send her into a deathlike state following a brief period of intimacy that results in the conception of a son, August.^{[ch. 450, 526]} Her body is preserved in a lacrima crystal beneath Fairy Tail's guild hall, where it produces a source of limitless magic known as Fairy Heart (妖精の心臓(フェアリーハート), Fearī Hāto),^{[ch. 451]} codenamed Lumen Histoire (ルーメン・イストワール, Rūmen Isutowāru),^{[ch. 258]} with Precht Gaebolg building a false grave on Sirius Island to hide this secret.^{[ch. 203]} Mavis consequently appears as an astral projection that can only be seen and heard by those marked with Fairy Tail's emblem.^{[ch. 268]} She is eventually revived by the destruction of her stasis crystal to personally confront Zeref, and lifts their mutual curse by accepting her love for him despite also hating him, which enables both of their deaths.^{[ch. 489, 537]} One year later, a girl who shares Mavis's appearance named Mio (ミオ) surfaces and encounters a young man named Alios, who resembles Zeref.^{[ch. 545]}

Mavis's background was included in the very first concepts of the series.^{[vol. 31:195]} Mashima conceived her as an elderly male character, later changing her into a young girl after being informed that "Mavis" was a female name. He also expanded the character's involvement in the story because of her "immense popularity", remarking that he had "no idea" she would become so popular.^{[vol. 32:191]} Mashima said that many readers were surprised by Mavis's relationship with Zeref, which he had decided on "quite a long time ago" before revealing it.^{[vol. 53:189]} He intended to draw a detailed kissing scene between the two characters, but amidst concerns regarding Mavis's appearance, he decided that depicting the scene in a silhouette would be "more beautiful and effective".^{[vol. 53:189]}

==== Precht Gaebolg ====
Voiced by: Masashi Hirose (2010–2014), Yutaka Aoyama (2015–present) (Japanese); John Swasey (English)

Precht Gaebolg (プレヒト・ゲイボルグ, Purehito Geiborugu), primarily known under the alias of Hades (ハデス, Hadesu),^{[ch. 214]} is one of Fairy Tail's co-founders and the master of Grimoire Heart. His first name is based on that of a literary scholar,^{[vol. 27:184]} while his surname comes from the mythical Irish spear Gáe Bolg.^{[vol. 53:194]} Succeeding Mavis Vermillion as second guild master upon her deathlike state caused by Zeref, Precht becomes engrossed in black magic when his attempts to resurrect her inadvertently produce Fairy Heart,^{[ch. 451]} which spurs him on a quest to uncover the source of magic power.^{[ch. 215]} Upon tracing the source back to Zeref, he becomes obsessed with obtaining this singularity for himself and founds Grimoire Heart, assuming that he must awaken Zeref's dormant power to achieve his goal.^{[ch. 249]} Hades practices powerful spells such as Grimoire Law (悪魔の法律(グリモアロウ), Gurimoa Rō), a dark version of Makarov Dreyar's Fairy Law,^{[ch. 214]} and the artificial Devil's Eye (悪魔の眼, Akuma no Me) beneath his eyepatch, which gives him access to even greater dark powers developed by Zeref when opened.^{[ch. 247]} His signature magic allows him to produce chains from his hands to grapple and throw opponents.^{[ch. 214]} Using a mechanical "heart" on board his guild's airship that is based on his knowledge of Fairy Heart,^{[vol. 53:189]} Hades overpowers Fairy Tail's attacks until the heart is destroyed by Happy and Carla.^{[ch. 248]} He is spared by Makarov upon his defeat, only to be killed by Zeref shortly afterward for summoning Acnologia through his actions.^{[ch. 250]}

==== Makarov Dreyar ====
Voiced by: Shinpachi Tsuji, Eri Inagawa (baby) (Japanese); R. Bruce Elliott, Brandon Acosta (young), Colleen Clinkenbeard (baby) (English)

Makarov Dreyar (マカロフ・ドレアー, Makarofu Doreā) is the son of guild co-founder Yuri Dreyar (ユーリ・ドレアー, Yūri Doreā), and serves as the third and incumbent master of the Fairy Tail guild throughout the series; Mashima came up with the character's name because he wanted it to sound Russian.^{[vol. 2]} He is an old, diminutive man who is registered as one of the Ten Wizard Saints (聖十大魔導, Seiten Daimadō), a title given to those recognized by the Magic Council for possessing the highest magical power and skill of any wizard on the continent of Ishgal.^{[ch. 47]} He has knowledge of numerous forms of magic, including the ability to vastly increase his size using the magic Giant (巨人(ジャイアント), Jaianto).^{[ch. 28]} He is a grandfatherly figure who looks upon his guild's members as his own children,^{[ch. 50]} although he is beleaguered by the problems they cause him with the council.^{[ch. 2]} A running gag in the series is Makarov's inability to secure a permanent successor,^{[ch. 69]} resulting in him holding the position of sixth and eighth guild master after Gildarts Clive and Erza Scarlet, respectively.^{[ch. 259, 448]} He eventually sacrifices his life to annihilate the Alvarez Empire's army using his ultimate technique, Fairy Law (妖精の法律(フェアリーロウ), Fearī Rō), which reduces the caster's lifespan to eliminate anyone they consider to be an enemy without harming their allies,^{[ch. 66, 505]} although Mavis Vermillion later resurrects him as a paraplegic upon her own death.^{[ch. 537, 545]}

=== S-Class wizards ===
Fairy Tail's S-Class wizards (S級魔導士, Esu-kyū madōshi) are the guild's highest-ranking members who are recognized by the master for their strength, skill, and conviction.^{[ch. 201]} Erza Scarlet, one of the protagonists, holds the S-Class rank at the start of the series.^{[ch. 24]} Mashima has stated that the "S" stands for words such as "super", "special", or the Japanese phrase "Soreya yabai zo!!" (それやヤバイぞ!!; "That's gotta be dangerous!!").^{[vol. 4:189]}

==== Mirajane Strauss ====
Voiced by: Ryōko Ono (Japanese); Monica Rial (English)

Mirajane Strauss (ミラジェーン・ストラウス, Mirajēn Sutorausu) is the guild's barmaid and administrator with white hair,^{[ch. 2]} who also works as a pin-up girl for the fictional Weekly Sorcerer (週刊ソーサラー, Shūkan Sōsarā) magazine.^{[ch. 1]} Gaining infamy as "Demon Woman" (魔人, Majin), Mirajane is the older sister of Lisanna and Elfman who use a variety of the transformation-based magic Takeover (接収(テイクオーバー), Teikuōbā). Her variety is called Satan Soul (サタンソウル, Satan Sōru), which allows her to assume the forms and powers of various demons she has defeated.^{[ch. 117]} Before the beginning of the series, Mirajane resents her magic after enduring constant ridicule, but reconsiders when her siblings learn their own Takeover varieties to comfort her. After her sister, Lisanna, disappears when she is 18 years old, she develops a cheerful personality while posing as a "pretty naive girl"^{[ch. 25]}because of the trauma she suffered from that incident. Mirajane also restricts her Takeover magic to only mimic others' physical appearances and voices, and retires from active S-Class work. She eventually regains her Satan Soul variety to rescue her brother, Elfman, during the Battle of Fairy Tail two years later.^{[ch. 52, 117]} Mashima named the character after the username of a friend he met in an online game. He also settled on her family's backstory "a very long time" before including it in the story, saying that "the chance to tell it just never seemed right", and that he was happy when the opportunity arose.^{[vol. 45:189]}

==== Mystogan ====
Voiced by: Daisuke Namikawa (Japanese); Robert McCollum, Terri Doty (child) (English)

Mystogan (ミストガン, Misutogan) is a masked Fairy Tail wizard who hails from the parallel universe of Edolas as the counterpart of Jellal Fernandes.^{[ch. 167]} Unable to use magic on his own, Mystogan employs staves infused with magic power for many effects, such as to create illusions and draw magic circles to attack his opponents.^{[ch. 120]} Before revealing his physical appearance, Mystogan usually casts sleeping spells on his guildmates whenever he visits, in order to prevent them from uncovering his identity.^{[ch. 24]} He originally arrives in Earth-land to close inter-dimensional anima portals used by Faust, his father and Edolas's king, to siphon magic energy from Earth-land and convert it into lacrima crystals.^{[ch. 190]} Unable to prevent Magnolia from being absorbed along with Fairy Tail,^{[ch. 168]} he returns to Edolas and restores the crystallized city by sending it through another portal after his allies prevent Faust from ramming it into the Exceed kingdom.^{[ch. 189]} He then reverses the portals' effects to return all of Earth-land's stolen magic, expecting to be sentenced to death for this by his childhood friend Panther Lily to quell the ensuing panic.^{[ch. 195]} When Natsu Dragneel takes responsibility instead, Mystogan earns his people's support by defeating him in a mock battle, and remains in Edolas to replace his father as king.^{[ch. 197]}

==== Laxus Dreyar ====
Voiced by: Katsuyuki Konishi (Japanese); Patrick Seitz (English)

Laxus Dreyar (ラクサス・ドレアー, Rakusasu Doreā) is Makarov Dreyar's grandson and heir to the position of guild master. The character's name is derived from the word "lux", a unit of measurement for light.^{[vol. 27:184]} He is an expert lightning wizard capable of generating and transforming into bolts of electricity. He is also a second generation Dragon Slayer whose father, Ivan Dreyar, implanted a lacrima crystal within him as a child that enables him to use Lightning Dragon Slayer Magic (雷の滅竜魔法, Kaminari no Metsuryū Mahō).^{[ch. 128]} As a teenager, Laxus feels overshadowed by his grandfather and eventually rebels following his father's expulsion from the guild,^{[ch. 106, 119]} growing into a strength supremacist at the start of the series.^{[ch. 24]} When Fairy Tail's reputation began to falter after the war with Phantom Lord, Laxus organized an intra-guild battle royal called the "Battle of Fairy Tail" in a bid to seize control of the guild from Makarov and reestablish its strength by rooting out the guild's "weaklings".^{[ch. 107]} After his plans fail, Makarov expels him for endangering his guildmates, although he leaves on friendlier terms with them.^{[ch. 128]} He later joins Fairy Tail's battle against Hades on Sirius Island,^{[ch. 244]} and is reinstated into the guild by Gildarts Clive during the latter's brief period as guild master.^{[ch. 260]} Laxus later joins the Grand Magic Games during the Grand Magic Games arc and is part of Team Fairy Tail B along with members Gajeel, Mirajane and Juvia.^{[ch. 268]}

==== Gildarts Clive ====
Voiced by: Kazuhiko Inoue (Japanese); Jason Douglas (English)

Gildarts Clive (ギルダーツ・クライヴ, Girudātsu Kuraivu) is an S-Class wizard who is regarded by Fairy Tail to be their most powerful member.^{[ch. 106]} He can break any object or spell he touches down into blocks using the magic Crush (クラッシュ, Kurasshu), which requires Magnolia's streets to reconfigure into a single, narrow path towards the guild to prevent him from stumbling into buildings by mistake.^{[ch. 166]} Because he embarks on missions that have never been completed for up to a century,^{[ch. 165]} he only visits the guild on rare occasions for short periods of time;^{[ch. 232]} during one failed mission, he loses his left limbs and several internal organs after getting mauled by Acnologia.^{[ch. 166]} He is also the widowed father of Cana Alberona,^{[ch. 232]} but is unaware of his relationship with his daughter due to his deceased wife Cornelia divorcing him and giving birth while he is away on a six-year mission.^{[ch. 251]} Gildarts discovers the truth from Cana twelve years later after Fairy Tail's battle with Grimoire Heart on Sirius Island, and subsequently begins doting on her in a comical fashion.^{[ch. 256]} After returning from the island, Gildarts is elected by Makarov as the guild's fifth master after Macao Conbolt,^{[ch. 258]} but resigns from the position almost immediately to leave on another journey.^{[ch. 259]} He returns one year later to participate in the war against the Alvarez Empire,^{[ch. 495]} remaining at the guild in the series epilogue.^{[ch. 545]} Mashima described the character as "a dumb-looking old guy", and considered his first appearance to be "a really big event" within the story.^{[vol. 20:188]}

=== Other members ===
==== Cana Alberona ====
Voiced by: Eri Kitamura (Japanese); Jamie Marchi (English)

Cana Alberona (カナ・アルベローナ, Kana Aruberōna) is an alcoholic woman who drinks entire barrels of liquor at a time,^{[ch. 2]} consuming 30% of the guild's alcohol.^{[ch. 38]} Her name is derived from the tarot term "arcana".^{[vol. 2:190]} She uses magic cards (魔法の札(マジックカード), majikku kādo) either as projectile weapons or to perform a variety of spells,^{[ch. 38]} including fortune-telling.^{[ch. 51]} As the most senior guild member of Lucy Heartfilia's generation,^{[ch. 201]} Cana joins Fairy Tail at the age of six after her mother's death to search for her father, Gildarts Clive. Unable to reveal her relationship to him because of her own timidity and his seldom presence, Cana motivates herself to become an S-Class wizard, but fails four qualification tests in a row and falls into depression.^{[ch. 232]} During her fifth test on Sirius Island twelve years later,^{[ch. 202]} Cana abandons her guildmates in Grimoire Heart's attack to complete the trial of finding Mavis Vermillion's grave, inadvertently endangering her test partner, Lucy.^{[ch. 225]} Upon realizing her own treachery, Cana rejects her chance for promotion in favor of saving her friends,^{[ch. 232]} and eventually reveals herself to Gildarts as his daughter after the trial's cancellation.^{[ch. 251]} Later, Cana becomes proficient at using the Fairy Glitter spell occasionally provided to her by Mavis,^{[ch. 285]} which she uses to revive her physical body by destroying her astral projection with the spell.^{[ch. 489]}

==== Loke ====
Voiced by: Daisuke Kishio (Japanese); Eric Vale (English)

Leo (レオ, Reo),^{[ch. 72]} better known as Loke (ロキ, Roki), is a humanoid celestial spirit and a playboy who is regarded as a popular bachelor in the wizard community;^{[ch. 2]} his name is derived from the Norse god Loki.^{[vol. 2:190]} His finger ring Regulus (王の光(レグルス), Regurusu) can generate blinding or damaging light at will.^{[ch. 115]} Under the ownership of Blue Pegasus member Karen Lilica (カレン・リリカ, Karen Ririka), Loke remains in the human world on behalf of his fellow spirit Aries to protect her from Karen's abuse. After Karen is killed by Oración Seis member Angel after Loke refuses to accompany her on a mission, the Celestial Spirit King permanently exiles Loke to the human world, where he relies on magic-infused finger rings besides Regulus to perform magic.^{[ch. 73]} When Loke is on the verge of dying three years later, Lucy Heartfilia convinces the king to let him return to the spirit world.^{[ch. 73]} Loke later serves as one of Lucy's contracted spirits, openly expressing romantic feelings for her after having avoided her out of guilt for Karen's death,^{[ch. 10]} and occasionally summoning himself through his own power to aid her and the rest of Fairy Tail.^{[ch. 114, 202]} Loke is also the leader of the twelve zodiacs as stated by himself and Gray.

==== Elfman Strauss ====
Voiced by: Hiroki Yasumoto (Japanese); Christopher Sabat, Anastasia Muñoz (child) (English)

Elfman Strauss (エルフマン・ストラウス, Erufuman Sutorausu) is the brother of Mirajane and Lisanna. Mashima developed his name to sound "somewhat cute".^{[vol. 2:190]} He is a hypermasculine, muscle-brained wizard who spouts nonsensical speeches about manhood,^{[ch. 2]} but is also kindhearted and emotionally sensitive.^{[ch. 51]} He employs the Takeover magic Beast Soul (獣王の魂(ビーストソウル), Bīsuto Sōru) to assimilate the powers and forms of monsters, although his transformations are limited to his right arm using the Beast Arm (ビーストアーム, Bīsuto Āmu) ability due to his lack of proficiency.^{[vol. 15:omake]} His first attempt at achieving a full-body transformation at age 13 causes him to go berserk and seemingly kill Lisanna in the process, resulting in him adopting his masculine personality to cope with his guilt.^{[ch. 54]} Two years later, Elfman gains control over his Beast Soul form to rescue Mirajane from Phantom Lord, after which he employs his full strength more frequently.^{[ch. 56]}

==== Levy McGarden ====
Voiced by: Mariya Ise (Japanese); Kristi Kang (2009-2019), Hannah Alyea (2024–present) (English)

Levy McGarden (レビィ・マクガーデン, Rebī Makugāden) is a cornflower blue-haired member of Shadow Gear (シャドウ・ギア, Shadō Gia), a three-wizard team that also includes Jet and Droy. She becomes one of Lucy Heartfilia's friends over their shared love of books, encouraging Lucy to let her be the first to read her novel.^{[ch. 48]} Using the magic Solid Script (立体文字(ソリッドスクリプト), Soriddo Sukuriputo), Levy transforms written words into three-dimensional objects that take on the attributes of whatever is written. She is also proficient at translating and decoding ancient languages and runic magic. Gajeel Redfox frightens Levy after he wounds her and her team during his membership in Phantom Lord, leading to a war between their guilds.^{[ch. 47]} She initially avoids Gajeel when he joins Fairy Tail, but reconsiders after he defends her from a disgruntled Laxus Dreyar.^{[ch. 105]} She subsequently begins to develop romantic feelings for Gajeel,^{[ch. 202]} with the two becoming temporary officers of the Magic Council's custody and arrest unit during Fairy Tail's one-year dissolution, and later committing themselves to each other while battling the Alvarez Empire. In the series epilogue, Levy is overheard by Lucy and Wendy Marvell telling Gajeel something about a baby.^{[ch. 545]} Mashima designed Levy to be a background character in the series, but grew to "really [like] her".^{[vol. 27:184]} He subsequently expanded her role in response to her rise in popularity, which he said defied his expectations.^{[vol. 32:191]}

==== Gajeel Redfox ====
Voiced by: Wataru Hatano (Japanese); David Wald (2012-2024), Phil Parsons (2024-present) (English)

Gajeel Redfox (ガジル・レッドフォックス, Gajiru Reddofokkusu) is a Dragon Slayer whose Iron Dragon Slayer Magic (鉄の滅竜魔法, Tetsu no Metsuryū Mahō) allows him to transform his limbs into iron weapons, cover his skin with impenetrable iron scales, breathe gusts of wind containing metal shrapnel, and consume iron objects for nourishment.^{[ch. 61]} Transported 400 years from the past through Eclipse as a child in the surviving dragons' plan to kill Acnologia,^{[ch. 465]} Gajeel is separated from his fellow Dragon Slayers and forgets his childhood besides being raised by the dragon Metalicana (メタリカーナ, Metarikāna).^{[ch. 510]} He resents Metalicana for his disappearance,^{[ch. 66]} becoming a delinquent member of Phantom Lord nicknamed "Kurogane" (鉄竜(くろがね); lit. 'Black Steel", written as "Iron Dragon'), whose act of defacing Fairy Tail's guildhall and assaulting Levy McGarden's team instigates a war between the two guilds.^{[ch. 48]} After Phantom Lord's dissolution, Gajeel reluctantly accepts Makarov Dreyar's offer of membership into Fairy Tail to atone for his actions,^{[ch. 212]} gaining the guild's trust and acceptance after helping Natsu Dragneel defeat Laxus Dreyar in the Battle of Fairy Tail.^{[ch. 126]} He subsequently develops protective feelings for Levy,^{[ch. 210]} eventually confessing his love for her while being nearly killed during the war with the Alvarez Empire.^{[ch. 488]} In the series epilogue, Gajeel has an implied conversation with Levy about a baby.^{[ch. 545]}

Gajeel was the first of several Dragon Slayers besides Natsu to be introduced in the series, an idea Mashima considered upon creating the "Dragon Slayer" concept, creating him to be an "extremely scary" rival for Natsu.^{[vol. 8:190]} The character's name is derived from the word kajiru (噛る; "to gnaw") and the onomatopoeia for eating, gaji-gaji (ガジガジ).^{[vol. 27:184]} Similar to Natsu, Gajeel's age is listed as "unknown",^{[ch. 105]} which became a subject of questions from readers following a scene where he and Natsu are caught in a runic trap designed to contain those over 80 years old, to which Mashima asserted that this was not their actual age.^{[vol. 15:188]} Gajeel's backstory with Magic Council member Belno was a "simplified" version of what Mashima had initially planned, with the author's original intent being that Belno would be Gajeel's catalyst for joining Fairy Tail before changing it to Makarov.^{[vol. 47:185]}

==== Juvia Lockser ====
Voiced by: Mai Nakahara (Japanese); Brina Palencia (English)

Juvia Lockser (ジュビア・ロクサー, Jubia Rokusā), spelled "Loxar" in the Funimation dub, is a blue-haired wizard originating from the Element 4, Phantom Lord's S-Class team that specializes in magic related to the four classical elements ^{[ch. 47, 56]}. Her magic, Water (水流(ウォーター), Wōtā), allows her to manipulate and turn her body into water at will, rendering her immune to physical damage, and gaining her notoriety as Juvia of the "Great Sea" (大海のジュビア, Taikai no Jubia).^{[ch. 56, 104]} She also speaks in third person; But in the English Dub, she speaks in first person. As a child, she is ridiculed as a "rain woman" because of the downpours she has caused.^{[ch. 48]} Her participation in the guilds' war over Lucy Heartfilia leads to an encounter with Gray Fullbuster. She duels with Gray, but loses and the rain around her stops for the first time in her life.^{[ch. 56-57]} After Phantom Lord dissolves, Juvia joins Fairy Tail in pursuit of Gray's affections, and considers anyone he interacts with to be a romantic rival.^{[ch. 256]} Eventually, Juvia becomes more cheerful and changes her appearance several times to suit her new personality, although her feelings for Gray remain unrequited for some time. After rescuing Gray at the cost of her own life, she is healed by Wendy Marvell.^{[ch. 499]} Mashima does not remember the origins of her name, but really loves it.^{[vol. 27:extra]}

==== Porlyusica ====
Voiced by: Shōko Tsuda (Japanese); Linda Young (English)

The human counterpart of Grandeeney from Edolas, Porlyusica (ポーリュシカ, Pōryushika; also "Poluchka") is Fairy Tail's elderly medicinal advisor who lives in the forest on the outskirts of Magnolia. She remedies all sorts of ailments and injuries, but resents humans and often forces visitors out of her house unless they are in need of help.^{[ch. 51]} She is a longtime friend of Makarov Dreyar, whom she nurses to health when he is drained of his magic, and later when he falls deathly ill during Laxus Dreyar's rebellion.^{[ch. 119]} Seven years after Sirius Island's disappearance, she meets Wendy Marvell and instructs her on advanced Sky Dragon Slayer Magic spells relayed to her by Grandeeney; she fails to teach them to Wendy before her disappearance.^{[ch. 260]}

==== Lisanna Strauss ====
Voiced by: Harumi Sakurai (Japanese); Carrie Savage (English)

Lisanna Strauss (リサーナ・ストラウス, Risāna Sutorausu) is the younger sister of Mirajane and Elfman who can shapeshift into different animals at will with her Animal Soul (動物の魂(アニマルソウル), Animaru Sōru) Takeover variety. She is one of Natsu Dragneel's childhood friends and also love interest who helps him hatch Happy's egg.^{[vol. 15:omake]} When Lisanna is 16 years old, she is seemingly killed by Elfman in his berserk full-body takeover form;^{[ch. 55]} in truth, Lisanna survives and is absorbed through an anima portal into the parallel world of Edolas, where she quietly assumes membership within Edolas's version of Fairy Tail after being mistaken for her own counterpart. Two years later, she is forced to return to Earth-land when Mystogan reverses Anima's effects, reuniting Lisanna with her siblings.^{[ch. 199]} Mashima conceived the character's name because he felt the suffix "-anna" made it sound cute.^{[vol. 27:184]}

==== Raijin Tribe ====
The Raijin Tribe (雷神衆, Raijinshū; "Thunder God Tribe"), renamed the "Thunder Legion" in Funimation's anime dub, is a trio of wizards who act as Laxus Dreyar's personal bodyguards and followers. They were created by Mashima after he "suddenly" thought the series' story arc focusing on Laxus.^{[vol. 13:afterword]} The three help carry out Laxus' plans to restructure the guild by participating in the Battle of Fairy Tail,^{[ch. 108]} but become friendlier towards their guildmates after his expulsion.^{[ch. 128]} Aside from their own unique abilities, the three members each share the ability to cast magic by making eye contact with their opponents.^{[ch. 115]}

===== Fried Justine =====
Voiced by: Junichi Suwabe (Japanese); John Burgmeier (English)

Fried Justine (フリード・ジャスティーン, Furīdo Jasutīn; spelled "Freed" in some of Del Rey's manga volumes), also called "Dark" Fried (暗黒のフリード, Ankoku no Furīdo), is the a color between pale green and green-haired founder and leader of the Raijin Tribe.^{[ch. 106]} He specializes in creating Jutsu-Shiki (術式; lit. 'technique style/ceremony'),^{[vol. 13:translation notes]} barriers formed by magic runes that cannot be passed unless those trapped inside follow what is written.^{[ch. 108]} He also uses the magic Dark Écriture (闇の文字(エクリテュール), Yami no Ekurityūru; French for "Dark Writing") to write runes on others' bodies with his rapier to inflict pain, ^{[ch. 117]} or on his own body to create wings and transform himself into a demon.^{[ch. 118]} He is characterized by his idolization of Laxus, and initially distances himself from the rest of his guild. He imposes the rules of the Battle of Fairy Tail with his Jutsu-Shiki,^{[ch. 108]} and reluctantly carries out Laxus' orders to kill their guildmates. This leads him to question Laxus' morality.^{[ch. 114]} After being overpowered by Mirajane Strauss' reawakened Satan Soul form, Fried temporarily shaves his long hair as a form of atonement for his misdeeds.^{[ch. 118, 129]} His name is derived from the Japanese phrase "Furui-zo" (古いぞ; lit. 'It's old'), reflecting the character's initial concept of attacking with archaic words.^{[vol. 27:extra]} His name was originally going to be Albion (アルビオン, Arubion), but Mashima shortened it to balance out his teammates' longer names.^{[vol. 27:extra]}

===== Evergreen =====
Voiced by: Saori Seto (Japanese); Caitlin Glass (English)

Evergreen (エバーグリーン, Ebāgurīn), named after the tree of the same name,^{[vol. 27:extra]} is a vain young woman, obsessed with fairies, who joins Fairy Tail because of the guild's name. She covets Erza Scarlet's title of "Fairy Queen, Titania". At some point, she joins the Raijin Tribe as its sole female member.^{[ch. 107,112]} Her primary magic is her Stone Eyes (石化眼(ストーンアイズ), Sutōn Aizu; Japanese text translates as "Petrifying Eyes"), with which she can petrify others through eye contact after removing her eyeglasses.^{[ch. 107]} She can also produce golden dust to cause explosions as well as an endless barrage of needles.^{[ch. 112]} During the S-Class qualification trial, she partners with Elfman Strauss, after being passed over by Fried Justine in favor of Bickslow, and gradually develops feelings for him.^{[vol. 202, 279]}

===== Bickslow =====
Voiced by: Yoshihisa Kawahara (Japanese); Scott Freeman (2012–2015), Tyler Walker (2016–present) (English)

Bickslow (ビックスロー, Bikkusurō), spelled "Bixlow" in the English dub, is a wizard who practices seith magic (セイズ魔法, seizu mahō) called Human Possession (人型憑, Hitotsuki) to implant up to five wandering souls within inanimate objects and control them.^{[ch. 108]} He refers to his puppets as his "babies" with the names: Pappa (パッパ), Pippi (ピッピ), Puppu (プップ), Peppe (ペッペ), and Poppo (ポッポ).^{[ch. 108]} His eye magic is called Figure Eyes (造形眼, フィギュアアイズ, Figyua Aizu; Japanese text translates as "Molding Eyes"), which allows him to take control of others' bodies through eye contact, wearing a grilled visor to contain this magic.^{[ch. 115]} According to Mashima, the character's name is a combination of the words "big" and "throw".^{[vol. 27:extra]}

==== Panther Lily ====
Voiced by: Hiroki Tōchi (Japanese); Rick Keeling (2011-2019), Gabe Kunda (2024–present) (English)

Panther Lily (パンサーリリー, Pansā Rirī), spelled "Pantherlily" in the Funimation version, is a black-furred Exceed born and raised in Edolas. While a division commander of the Edolas Royal Military, he is exiled from his homeland Extalia after rescuing a young Mystogan.^{[ch. 189]} As opposed to most Exceed, Lily has a large, humanoid body resembling an anthropomorphic panther. Using the magic sword Buster Marm (バスターマァム, Basutā Māmu), it can extend up to four times his size;^{[ch. 186]}^{[vol. 22:bonus]} after this sword is destroyed battling Gajeel, he replaces it with the similar Musica Sword (ムジカの剣, Mujika no Ken).^{[ch. 247]} that he steals from a member of Grimiore Heart. He duels with Gajeel Redfox while defending the lacrima crystal created from the residents of Magnolia as part of Faust's plan to exterminate the Exceed with it, but has a change of heart after seeing the Exceed gather to push the crystal away alongside Fairy Tail.^{[ch. 189]} After being sent to Earth-land through the reversed anima portal, he joins Fairy Tail as Gajeel's partner.^{[ch. 198]} In Earth-land, Lily's body shrinks to his species' typical small size, though he assumes his original form for limited periods of time in addition to using his Aera ability.^{[ch. 200]} Lily's name is a play on "a famous character from a certain fairy tale".^{[vol. 27:bonus]} Mashima commented on the character's popularity, saying, "I guess he's more popular now that he's small? Yeah."^{[vol. 32:afterword]}

==== Mest Gryder ====
Voiced by: Shūhei Sakaguchi (Japanese); Alex Organ (2014-2016), Christopher Wehkamp (2018–present) (English)

Mest Gryder (メスト・グライダー, Mesuto Guraidā) is a wizard who possesses a memory alteration charm called Memory Control (記憶操作, Kioku Sōsa), and the power to teleport across long distances with the spell Direct Line (瞬間移動(ダイレクトライン), Dairekuto Rain).^{[ch. 213, 215]} Initially depicted as an intelligence operative of the Magic Council named Doranbalt (ドランバルト, Doranbaruto),^{[ch. 223]} spelled "Doranbolt" in the English dub, he uses his Memory Control to disguise himself as Mystogan's disciple in Fairy Tail to search of incriminating evidence that may result in the guild's dissolution.^{[ch. 213]} Seven years after growing fond of the guild and allying himself with them against Grimoire Heart, however, Mest is informed by Makarov Dreyar of his true identity as a longtime Fairy Tail member who altered his own memories in a haphazard attempt to extract information on the Alvarez Empire from the council.^{[ch. 416, 439]} Upon remembering his past, Mest leaves the council's service and fully rejoins Fairy Tail.^{[ch. 438]} Before unveiling Mest's role as an undercover council agent, Mashima considered making the character a legitimate Fairy Tail member, as well as a member of Grimoire Heart or Tartaros.^{[vol. 24:172]} Mashima later said that the reveal of Mest's legitimate membership was planned long in advance, but he never had the opportunity to foreshadow it, receiving complaints from readers who felt the character was retconned.^{[vol. 49:190]}

==== Touka and Faris ====
Voiced by: Sayumi Suzushiro (Touka) (Japanese); Celeste Perez (Touka) (English)

Touka (トウカ, Tōka) and Faris (ファリス, Farisu) are members introduced in Fairy Tail: 100 Years Quest. Touka is an Exceed girl who is possessed by Faris, a human shrine maiden who pretends to be the White Wizard with her ability to steal others' magic and erase it or control their minds. Both Touka and Faris are originally from a parallel universe called Elentear, which Faris attempts to save from the dragon god Selene by erasing powerful sources of magic in Earth-land, including Fairy Tail and the Five Dragon Gods, using Touka's "Aqua Aera" magic to travel between worlds. Touka appears to be enamored with Natsu, who unknowingly saved her from bandits during his training journey, but is later revealed to be in love with Happy, having mistaken Natsu's name as his.

==== Minor members ====
Between the primary guild members' seven-year disappearance and return from Sirius Island, the guild is temporarily reduced from over 100 members at the beginning of the series to fourteen.^{[ch. 254]} Macao Conbolt (マカオ・コンボルト, Makao Konboruto) is a man who creates purple-colored flames that adhere to objects and cannot be doused by water or wind;^{[ch. 37]} he serves as the guild's fourth master in the interim of Makarov Dreyar's absence.^{[ch. 254]} Romeo Conbolt (ロメオ・コンボルト, Romeo Konboruto) is Macao's son who joins Fairy Tail over the course of the series, learning from Phantom Lord member Totomaru to produce up to seven colors of flame with varying properties.^{[ch. 256]} Wakaba Mine (ワカバ・ミネ, Wakaba Mine) is Macao's friend and eventual guild master advisor who manipulates smoke from a pipe.^{[ch. 61]} Alzack Connel (アルザック・コネル, Aruzakku Koneru; also "Connell") and Bisca Moulin (ビスカ・ムーラン, Bisuka Mūran; also "Mulan") are two western immigrants who later marry and have a six-year-old daughter, Asuka Connel (アスカ・コネル, Asuka Koneru; "Asca");^{[ch. 260]} Alzack uses guns that shoot magical bullets,^{[ch. 52]} while Bisca equips various firearms similarly to Erza Scarlet.^{[ch. 53]} Jet (ジェット, Jetto) and Droy (ドロイ, Doroi) are Levy McGarden's teammates from Shadow Gear, both of whom have unrequited feelings for her; Jet's magic gives him super speed,^{[ch. 43]} while Droy grows magic plants.^{[ch. 44]} Max Alors (マックス・アローゼ, Makkusu Arōze; also "Aloze") is the guild's public event manager who manipulates sand,^{[ch. 59]} and is friends with telepathic member Warren Rocko (ウォーレン・ラッコー, Wōren Rakkō; also "Rocco").^{[ch. 54]} Nab Lasaro (ナブ・ラサロ, Nabu Rasaro) is a procrastinator who never embarks on a mission for the entirety of the series, and can enhance his physical abilities using the spirits of animals.^{[ch. 35]} Vijeeter Ecor (ビジター・エコー, Bijitā Ekō) is a man who adjusts others' fighting power by dancing.^{[ch. 63]} Laki Olietta (ラキ・オリエッタ, Raki Orietta) is a girl with a bizarre vocabulary whose Wood Make (木の造形魔法(ウッドメイク), Uddo Meiku) produces wooden objects similarly to Gray Fullbuster's Ice Make.^{[ch. 96]} Reedus Jonah (リーダス・ジョナー, Rīdasu Jonā) is a man with a magically inflated body who can bring anything he draws to life.^{[ch. 36]} Kinana (キナナ) is the true form of Cobra's snake, Cubellios, who is restored to human form by Makarov Dreyar and becomes a guild employee and later wizard;^{[ch. 438]} she is based on Kina Kobayashi, one of Mashima's assistants.^{[vol. 21:187]}

== Villains ==
=== Zeref Dragneel ===
Voiced by: Akira Ishida, Aina Kusuda (child) (Japanese); Joel McDonald, Justin Briner (Ep. 311), Emily Fajardo (child) (English)

Zeref Dragneel (ゼレフ・ドラグニル, Zerefu Doraguniru) is the central antagonist of Fairy Tail who is mentioned early in the series as the most evil wizard in history called the "Black Wizard" (黒魔導士, Kuro Madōshi).^{[ch. 21]} He makes his first appearance at the end of volume 24, although he is not identified until the following volume.^{[ch. 200, 210]} Eventually, it is revealed that Zeref is Natsu Dragneel's centuries-old elder brother, made immortal and unaging by a curse called the Black Magic of Ankhselam (アンクセラムの黒魔術, Ankuseramu no Kuro Majutsu), which randomly kills everything around him whenever he cherishes the value of life. Years before the series' present, Ankhselam curses Zeref for trying to resurrect an infant Natsu, who is earlier killed with the rest of their family in a dragon attack. Becoming suicidal, Zeref eventually succeeds in reincarnating Natsu's dead body as a so-called demon dubbed "Etherious Natsu Dragneel" (E.N.D.) in the hope that Natsu would be capable of killing him.^{[ch. 436]} He then places Natsu under Igneel's tutelage and sends them 400 years forward to a magic-rich era through the time machine Eclipse in order to properly cultivate his powers.^{[ch. 465]} He eventually befriends Mavis Vermillion 300 years later, which develops into romance after she acquires the same curse until he inadvertently steals her life.^{[ch. 450]}

Living in solitude on Sirius Island, Zeref becomes disillusioned by the atrocities committed by Grimoire Heart in his supposed name as a mass-murdering embodiment of evil, leading him to spend the next seven years contemplating the eradication of humanity.^{[ch. 209, 250, 340]} One year later, he resurfaces as the emperor of the Alvarez Empire, a military nation he has constructed over a century under the alias of Spriggan (スプリガン, Supurigan) to counter the threat of Acnologia.^{[ch. 450]} Zeref leads a large-scale invasion of Ishgal in order to obtain Mavis's limitless power of Fairy Heart with which to perform Neo Eclipse (ネオ・エクリプス, Neo Ekuripusu), a spell that would enable him to relive his own life and undo the actions caused by himself and Acnologia, while also erasing the existence of countless people in the present.^{[ch. 530]} Zeref succeeds in absorbing Fairy Heart after Natsu's failure to kill him, but Natsu incapacitates him after negating his attacks with his own fire magic, after Mavis took the E.N.D. book away from Zeref and give the book to Lucy, Gray and Happy.^{[ch. 532, 536]} Zeref then dies after Mavis rekindles her love for him, allowing their mutual curse to kill them both.^{[ch. 537]} By the end of Fairy Tail, a young man identical in appearance to Zeref named Alios (アリオス, Ariosu) appears and encounters Mio, a girl who resembles Mavis.^{[ch. 545]}

Mashima had not given the character a name upon his first physical appearance in the story, and considered several possible choices before deciding to make him the previously unseen character Zeref;^{[vol. 24:172]} he intentionally avoided providing any hints to his identity beforehand, wanting it to be a "complete surprise" to the readers.^{[vol. 24:167]} Aiming to avoid portraying Zeref as "a typical bad guy", Mashima cultivated and inserted numerous elements into the character that made him "really highly complex". Mashima stated that Zeref "has really become a popular character" after the revelation of his identity, also calling him a "really dark" character who would "never make a silly face."^{[vol. 26:187]}

=== Acnologia ===
Voiced by: Kōsuke Toriumi (Japanese); J. Michael Tatum (English)

Acnologia (アクノロギア, Akunorogia) is one of the series' overarching antagonists, known as the "Dragon King" (竜の王, Ryū no Ō) for driving the dragon race to near extinction in Earth-land's historic Dragon King Festival (竜王祭, Ryūōsai).^{[ch. 301]} Originally a human Dragon Slayer who resents dragons for slaughtering his family and other innocents,^{[ch. 543]} he transforms into an immortal black dragon as a side effect of his magic;^{[ch. 301]} despite this, he is capable of alternating between his human and "dragonified" forms at will.^{[ch. 436]} Acnologia possesses no elemental Dragon Slayer trait, which grants him immunity to all forms of magic.^{[ch. 528]} Overtaken by bloodlust and considering himself to be invincible, he gains notoriety for the next four centuries as a harbinger of destruction who disregards all life,^{[ch. 252]} speaking only to those he acknowledges as his enemies.^{[ch. 405]} After nearly obliterating Sirius Island following Fairy Tail's battle with Grimoire Heart,^{[ch. 253]} and later losing an arm in a battle with Igneel that results in the latter's death,^{[ch. 414]} Acnologia participates in the war between Ishgal and the Alvarez Empire, aiming to achieve the extinction of dragons by killing the surviving Dragon Slayers.^{[ch. 470]} When he is lured by Blue Pegasus and Anna Heartfilia into a "space between time", a void dimension they attempt to permanently trap him In,^{[ch. 530]} Acnologia eats his way out and attains godlike power; this act also separates his human soul from his physical dragon body, which ravages Earth-land while the former imprisons the other Dragon Slayers in the void with himself to maintain his power.^{[ch. 540]} After Lucy Heartfilia seals his body within Fairy Sphere, Natsu Dragneel kills him by destroying his immobilized soul.^{[ch. 544]} Mashima regretted not giving more time to develop the character in the manga, envisioning a "deeper setting" that he felt unable to include from the protagonists' perspective, which he hoped he would have the opportunity to explore "at some point".

=== Phantom Lord ===
Phantom Lord (幽鬼の支配者(ファントムロード), Fantomu Rōdo; Japanese text translates as "Ruler of the Spirits") is an official wizard's guild of Fiore led by Jose Porla.^{[ch. 47, 52]} Jose boasts his guild's superior numbers and magical prowess, which includes a mechanized guildhall armed with the destructive magic cannon Jupiter (ジュピター, Jupitā),^{[ch. 52]} and which transforms into a mecha capable of casting Abyss Break (煉獄砕波(アビスブレイク), Abisu Bureiku; Japanese text translates to "Purgatory Break Wave"), a forbidden spell powered by magic of the four classical elements.^{[ch. 54, 57]} Other members of Phantom include Gajeel Redfox and the Element 4 (エレメント4, Eremento Fō), a quartet of wizards equivalent to Fairy Tail's S-Class wizards who each specialize in magic based on one of the four elements.^{[ch. 47]} Lucy Heartfilia's father Jude has Phantom retrieve her after she runs away from home.^{[ch. 50]} However, Jose is concerned about Fairy Tail's plans to monopolize the Heartfilia family's fortune and plots to hold Lucy for ransom.^{[ch. 64]} Deciding to demonstrate Phantom's supremacy to Fairy Tail, Jose sends Gajeel to destroy their guildhall and injure Levy McGarden's team, provoking them into an inter-guild war forbidden by the Magic Council.^{[ch. 47]} Eventually, Fairy Tail emerges victorious after Makarov Dreyar defeats Jose;^{[ch. 66]} Phantom is later disestablished by the council and Jose's title is revoked.^{[ch. 69]} Gajeel and Juvia leave following the guild's defeat and later join Fairy Tail.^{[ch. 48]}

Jose Porla (ジョゼ・ポーラ, Joze Pōra)
Voiced by: Takashi Matsuyama (Japanese); Ed Blaylock (English)
Jose is one of the Ten Wizard Saints who specializes in creating ghostly apparitions to act as soldiers.^{[ch. 47, 52]}
Aria (アリア; Italian for "Air")
Voiced by: Katsui Taira (Japanese); Chris Rager (English)
Aria, the leader of the Element 4, is a large man who uses air magic to produce invisible attacks and drain wizards of their magic;^{[ch. 49]} he wears a blindfold to keep his enormous power in check.^{[ch. 58]}
Sol (ソル, Soru; French for "Soil")
Voiced by: Eiji Sekiguchi (Japanese); Barry Yandell (English)
Sol is a French-speaking man who manipulates earth and can assume a malleable state.^{[ch. 55]}
Totomaru (兎兎丸)
Voiced by: Daisuke Endō (Japanese); Justin Cook (English)
Totomaru is a black-and-white-haired samurai who uses fire magic to manipulate any type of flame at will, and produces different-colored flames with varying properties.^{[ch. 53]}

=== Tower of Heaven ===
The Tower of Heaven (楽園の塔, Rakuen no Tō; lit. 'Tower of Paradise') is a tower designed to bring a deceased individual back to life through a form of magic called the Revive System (リバイブシステム, Ribaibu Shisutemu), also known simply as the R-System, which is activated after the Magic Council fires their ultimate weapon Etherion at the tower, which absorbs the attack's energy and reveals its true form as a giant lacrima crystal.^{[ch. 94]} It is originally built using slave labor by a cult of evil wizards for the purpose of resurrecting Zeref.^{[ch. 81]} Among the slaves forced to build the tower are Erza Scarlet and Jellal Fernandes. Jellal takes over construction of the tower while brainwashed by Ultear Milkovich, who poses as Zeref's spirit.^{[ch. 102]} Jellal tricks his friends into thinking that Erza betrayed them to save herself from the tower, but they turn on him after realizing his deception.^{[ch. 83]} Following Jellal's defeat, Erza's remaining friends decline her invitation to join Fairy Tail and go their separate ways.^{[ch. 102]}

Also serving Jellal at the tower are Trinity Raven (三羽鴉(トリニティレイヴン), Toriniti Reivun; Japanese text translates as "Three Ravens"), a trio of assassins from the Death's Head Caucus (髑髏会, Dokurokai) guild.^{[ch. 84,85]} Mashima introduced them "at the last moment" after he "started feeling really sorry for [Erza's childhood friends]" while planning their battles with Erza's group.^{[vol. 11:afterword]} Each member's is named after a different type of bird.^{[vol. 10:translation notes]}

Shō (ショウ)
Voiced by: Hiro Shimono (Japanese); Greg Ayres (English)
Shō is one of Ezra's former friends who wields a magic deck of cards containing pocket dimensions to trap others inside.
Simon (シモン, Shimon)
Voiced by: Yasuyuki Kase (Japanese); J. Michael Tatum, Kim Foster (child) (English)
Simon is a large man with a metal jaw who uses telepathy and shrouds areas in darkness. He harbors romantic feelings for Erza, remaining faithful to her despite Jellal's lies,^{[ch. 83]} and later dies while protecting her from him.^{[ch. 97]}
Wally Buchanan (ウォーリー・ブキャナン, Wōrī Bukyanan)
Voiced by: Kazuya Ichijō (Japanese); Chris Cason, Shelly Osterberger (child) (English)
Wally is a gangster-like gunslinger with an angular body that he can separate into blocks.

==== Trinity Raven ====
Ikaruga (斑鳩; lit. 'Japanese grosbeak')
Voiced by: Naomi Shindō (Japanese); Jennifer Seman (English)
Ikaruga is the leader of Trinity Raven. She speaks in haiku and wields a katana capable of cutting through any material.^{[ch. 91]}
Vidaldus Taka (ヴィダルダス・タカ, Vidarudasu Taka; "Taka" is Japanese for "hawk")
Voiced by: Hikaru Midorikawa (Japanese); Mike McFarland (English)
Vidaldus was originally introduced to his teammates as Jellal's stoic attendant,^{[ch. 76]} but is really a rock musician whose hair can absorb liquids. He uses an electric guitar to brainwash his opponents.^{[ch. 86]}
Fukuro (梟, Fukurō; lit. 'Owl')
Voiced by: Rikiya Koyama (Japanese); Daniel Penz (English)
Fukuro is a man with an owl's head and a jet pack who performs the same magic his opponents use by swallowing them.^{[ch. 88]}

=== Raven Tail ===
Raven Tail (大鴉の尻尾(レイヴンテイル), Reivun Teiru) is a dark guild that acts independently from the Balam Alliance,^{[ch. 131]} and becomes an official guild shortly after Fairy Tail's return from Sirius Island.^{[ch. 267]} The guild is led by Ivan Dreyar. Disguising himself as an armored wizard named Alexei (アレクセイ, Arekusei), Ivan leads a five-wizard team in the Grand Magic Games that consists of Obra, Flare Corona, Kurohebi, and Nullpudding. The five use underhanded tactics to win challenges and battles in the tournament, but are defeated single-handedly by Laxus and disqualified.^{[ch. 286]} Raven Tail dissolves entirely following the games.

Ivan Dreyar (イワン・ドレアー, Iwan Doreā; also "Iwan")
Voiced by: Masaharu Satō (Japanese); Bruce Carey (English)
Ivan is the leader of Raven Tail, Makarov Dreyar's estranged son, and Laxus Dreyar's father. He is obsessed with acquiring Lumen Histoire,^{[ch. 286]} an act resulting in his expulsion from Fairy Tail six years earlier.^{[ch. 119]}
Obra (オーブラ, Ōbura)
Voiced by: Yoshimitsu Shimoyama (Japanese); Tyler Walker (English)
Obra is an imp who operates a humanoid puppet and drains wizards of their magic.^{[ch. 272]}
Flare Corona (フレア・コロナ, Furea Korona)
Voiced by: Shizuka Itō (Japanese); Alex Moore (English)
Flare is a young woman with prehensile hair that can transform and ignite.^{[ch. 271]} After Raven Tail disbands, Flare makes amends with Fairy Tail and assists them in saving the Village of the Sun (太陽の村, Taiyō no Mura), her adopted hometown populated by giants.^{[ch. 347]}
Kurohebi (クロヘビ; lit. 'Black Snake')
Voiced by: Yoshimitsu Shimoyama (Japanese); Jessie James Grelle (English)
Kurohebi is a snake-like humanoid who mimics others' magic.^{[ch. 277]}
Nullpudding (ナルプディング, Narupudingu)
Voiced by: Eiji Miyashita (Japanese); Brad Jackson (English)
Nullpudding is a hunchback capable of growing spikes on his body.^{[ch. 269]}

=== Balam Alliance ===
The Balam Alliance (バラム同盟, Baramu Dōmei), translated as "Baram Alliance" in the English anime dub, is a triad of Fiore's most powerful dark guilds—Oración Seis, Grimoire Heart, and Tartaros—which control all other dark guilds in the series except the independent Raven Tail.^{[ch. 131]} The organization is described as a "non-aggression pact" whose guilds act independently from one another in spite of their designation as an "alliance".^{[ch. 200]} After all three guilds are defeated by Fairy Tail and their allies, the alliance is considered to have dissolved.

==== Oración Seis ====
Oración Seis (六魔将軍(オラシオンセイス), Orashion Seisu; Spanish for "Six Prayers") is a guild consisting of six members led by Brain that are considered to be no less dangerous for their command of multiple other dark guilds. Brain's followers are slaves from the Tower of Heaven whom Brain "adopts" to aid his plan to annihilate the world's official guilds using the morality-switching magic Nirvana (ニルヴァーナ, Niruvāna). Seven years after their arrest, the five are released from prison along with Brain, whom they leave for dead before Jellal convinces them to join Crime Sorcière.^{[ch. 364]}

The guild shares its name with a group of antagonists from Rave Master; Mashima originally used the name as a placeholder, which he ultimately kept by the release deadline.^{[vol. 16:185]} Mashima decided on the members' background as slaves early in their development, but struggled to incorporate it into the story.^{[vol. 19:186]} Mashima specified Cobra as one of the characters whose popularity defied his expectations, although he could not determine any reason why.^{[vol. 32:191]}

Brain (ブレイン, Burein) / Zero (ゼロ)
Voiced by: Tetsu Inada (Japanese); Philip Weber (English)
Brain is the leader of Oración Seis, a codenamed superintelligent wizard and Jellal Fernandes's mentor from the Tower of Heaven, who uses a sentient staff named Kurodoa (クロドア) to perform dark magic.^{[ch. 154]} Brain possesses an omnicidal split personality that serves as the guild's true master, Zero, which he suppresses with magic sealing marks on his body that are undone by the guild's defeat.
Erik (エリック, Erikku) / Cobra (コブラ, Kobura)
Voiced by: Atsushi Imaruoka (Japanese); Jarrod Greene (English)
Cobra is a second-generation Dragon Slayer with poisonous abilities and hyper-sensitive hearing; he commands a giant, winged snake named Cubellios (キュベリオス, Kyuberiosu).
Sawyer (ソーヤー, Sōyā) / Racer (レーサー, Rēsā)
Voiced by: Junji Majima (Japanese); Jeff Plunk (English)

A member of Oración Seis under the codename . He is a speed-maniac capable of slowing time around himself to appear faster than the naked eye.

Richard (リチャード, Richādo) / Hoteye (ホットアイ, Hottoai)
Voiced by: Kazuya Ichijō (Japanese); Chris Cason (English)
Hoteye is Wally Buchanan's money-obsessed older brother who can see through solid objects and liquify the ground around himself.
Sorano (ソラノ) / Angel (エンジェル, Enjeru)
Voiced by: Fuyuka Oura (Japanese); Lindsay Seidel (English)
Sorano is Yukino Agria's cruel older sister and a celestial wizard contracted with the zodiac spirits Gemini, Scorpio, and Aries; after her spirits abandon her, she gains the ability to summon angelic beings.^{[ch. 365]}
Macbeth (マクベス, Makubesu) / Midnight (ミッドナイト, Middonaito)
Voiced by: Kōki Uchiyama (Japanese); Micah Solusod (English)
Midnight is a lethargic wizard who can deflect others' magic, distort objects, and create illusions.

==== Grimoire Heart ====
Grimoire Heart (悪魔の心臓(グリモアハート), Gurimoa Hāto) is the most powerful guild of the Balam Alliance.^{[ch. 210]} Led by Hades,^{[ch. 215]} the guild assumes Zeref to be in a weakened "sleeping" state and aims to "awaken" him, which they erroneously believe would bring about an apocalyptic world where wizards may thrive while non-magic users—who make up over 90% of Earth-land's population—would be annihilated.^{[ch. 221]} They travel the world on their airship and commit countless atrocities to produce "keys" necessary to their goal,^{[ch. 102]} resulting in a war with Fairy Tail upon their discovery of Zeref on Sirius Island.^{[ch. 207]} Grimoire Heart ultimately disbands after Zeref kills Hades and condemns the guild for provoking his rage and summoning Acnologia through their actions.^{[ch. 250]}

The guild's sub-commander is Blue Note Stinger (ブルーノート・スティンガー, Burū Nōto Sutingā). Beneath Blue Note are the Seven Kin of Purgatory (煉獄の七眷属, Rengoku no Nana Kenzoku), an elite group of wizards who are trained by Hades in the use of Lost Magic (失われた魔法(ロストマジック), Rosuto Majikku),^{[ch. 217]} ancient spells that are noted as being lost to history because of their enormous power and terrible side effects when misused.^{[ch. 40]} Besides their leader Ultear Milkovich and her surrogate daughter, Merudy, the Seven Kin consist of Zancrow, Zoldio, Rustyrose, Kain Hikaru, Azuma. Other guild members include Kawazu and Yomazu.

Mashima revealed that Kain Hikaru's name is shared with one of his staff members' nicknames, while Rustyrose's name is derived from a cocktail, and Azuma's is based on television actor Azuma Mikihisa; he was "surprised" that he could not remember the origin of Zancrow's name.^{[vol. 27:184]} Mashima particularly pushed for Kain Hikaru's popularity among young readers, but was informed the character was disliked because "he isn't cool".^{[vol. 26:187]}

Blue Note Stinger (ブルーノート・スティンガー, Burū Nōto Sutingā)
Voiced by: Shirō Saitō (Japanese); Chuck Huber (English)
Blue Note is a man capable of generating powerful gravity fields and black holes.
Zancrow (ザンクロウ, Zankurō)
Voiced by: Tetsu Shiratori (Japanese); Ian Ferguson (English)
Zancrow is a God Slayer who uses divine black flames.^{[ch. 218]}
Zoldio (ゾルディオ, Zorudio)
Voiced by: Hiroki Yasumoto (Japanese); Marcus D. Stimac (English)
Zoldio is a human wizard who fused with the celestial spirit Capricorn. His original magic allows him to command human slaves.^{[ch. 224]}
Rustyrose (ラスティローズ, Rasutirōzu; also "Rusty Rose")
Voiced by: Kazuma Horie (Japanese); Justin Locklear (English)
Rustyrose is a wizard who can materialize anything from his imagination.^{[ch. 222]}
Kain Hikaru (華院 = ヒカル, Kain Hikaru)
Voiced by: Ryou Sugisaki (Japanese); Bryan Massey (English)
Kain is a sumo wrestler who practices the voodoo-like ushi no koku mairi.^{[ch. 226]}
Azuma (アズマ)
Voiced by: Hiroshi Shirokuma (Japanese); Ray Hurd (English)
Azuma is a wizard who harnesses magic power accumulated within the earth via his control of trees.^{[ch. 235]}
Kawazu (カワズ, Kawazu)
Voiced by: Yūichi Iguchi (Japanese); Ian Sinclair (English)
Kawazu is an anthropomorphic rooster who fires eggs from his mouth.^{[ch. 211]}
Yomazu (ヨマズ, Yomazu)
Voiced by: Daisuke Kageura (Japanese); Matt Thurston (English)
Yomazu is a doglike samurai who performs an Eastern variety of Levy McGarden's Solid Script with a katana.^{[ch. 211]}

==== Tartaros ====
Tartaros (冥府の門(タルタロス), Tarutarosu) is a guild consisting mostly of Etherious demons summoned from books written by Zeref. E.N.D., Zeref's ultimate demon and Natsu Dragneel's alter ego, is falsely purported to be the guild's master;^{[ch. 465]} the guild is secretly commanded by Mard Geer Tartaros. Their base is located inside the floating "Cube" (冥界島(キューブ), Kyūbu) headquarters, which transforms into the monster Pluto's Grim (冥王獣(プルトグリム), Puruto Gurimu) by Mard Geer's power.^{[ch. 382]} The guild's aim is to unseal E.N.D.'s soul from his book and exterminate humanity by detonating Face, the Magic Council's cross-continental pulse bomb network designed to neutralize Ishgal's magic, while having no effect on the demons' ability to use curses (呪法, juhō), a counterpart to magic that draws purely from negative emotions.^{[ch. 410]} Mard Geer commands the elite Nine Demon Gates (九鬼門, Kyūkimon) led by the avian demon Kyōka. The other Demon Gates include Jackal, Franmalth, Torafuzar, Ezel, Seilah, Keyes, Tempester, and Silver Fullbuster. After Tartaros is defeated by Fairy Tail, the surviving demons eventually die together with Zeref as part of a measure devised by the dark wizard.^{[ch. 465]}

Mashima stated that Kyōka was a character he "really [enjoyed]", and that she would do "a bunch of cruel things".^{[vol. 42:184]} He was surprised by Jackal's popularity among readers despite the character being "an awful guy", and added that he had difficulty writing Jackal's "half-baked Osaka-area accent".^{[vol. 45:189]} The story arc between Silver and Gray was something Mashima had determined before the former's appearance, yet Mashima had to change large portions of their planned battle scene upon noticing a "vital" setup mistake.^{[ch. 46:177]}

Mard Geer Tartaros (マルド・ギール・タルタロス, Marudo Gīru Tarutarosu)
Voiced by: Toshiyuki Morikawa (Japanese); Vic Mignogna (English)
Mard Geer is the commander of Tartaros. As "Underworld King" (冥王, Meiō), he is the keeper of E.N.D.'s book, whose curse powers include producing endless thorn brambles and deadly plants.^{[ch. 385]}
Kyōka (キョウカ)
Voiced by: Ai Kayano (Japanese); Janelle Lutz (English)
The leader of the Nine Demon Gates. She is a sadist who reinforces people's strength and increases their sensitivity to pain with her curse.
Silver Fullbuster (シルバー・フルバスター, Shirubā Furubasutā)
Voiced by: Kenjiro Tsuda (Japanese); Matthew Mercer (English)
A member of the Nine Demon Gates. He is Gray Fullbuster's deceased father and a Demon Slayer with ice magic, who is also included among the Demon Gates after being reanimated by Keyes and disguised as a human vessel for Deliora.
Jackal (ジャッカル, Jakkaru)
Voiced by: Takuma Terashima (Japanese); Ricco Fajardo (English)
A member of the Nine Demon Gates. He can detonate anything on contact and can assume a lycanthropic form.^{[ch. 360]}
Franmalth (フランマルス, Furanmarusu)
Voiced by: Yutaka Aoyama (Japanese); Jeremy Schwartz (English)
A member of the Nine Demon Gates. He is a cyclops who absorbs others' souls and copies their abilities.
Torafuzar (トラフザー, Torafuzā)
Voiced by: Masaki Terasoma (Japanese); Randy E. Aguebor (English)
A member of the Nine Demon Gates. He is an aquatic demon capable of flooding areas with poisonous water and turning his body harder than iron.^{[ch. 396-397]}
Ezel (エゼル, Ezeru)
Voiced by: Hiroshi Tsuchida (Japanese); Ben Bryant (English)
A member of the Nine Demon Gates. He can cut through anything with his multiple sword-like arms.
Seilah (セイラ, Seira)
Voiced by: Aki Toyosaki (Japanese); Michelle Rojas (English)
A member of the Nine Demon Gates. She can control people's bodies.
Keyes (キース, Kīsu)
Voiced by: Jouji Nakata (Japanese); Doug Jackson (English)
A member of the Nine Demon Gates. He is a skeletal necromancer who reanimates human corpses.
Tempester (テンペスター, Tenpesutā)
Voiced by: Takahiro Mizushima (Japanese); Ian Moore (English)
A member of the Nine Demon Gates. He is a bestial demon who utters imitative words that invoke natural disasters.
Lummy (ラミー, Ramī)
Voiced by: Momo Asakura (Japanese); Jill Harris (English)
A bunny girl demon who runs a facility where deceased members are resurrected and human recruits are transformed into demons, including Ziemma and Minerva Orland.

=== Alvarez Empire ===
The Alvarez Empire (アルバレス帝国, Arubaresu Teikoku; also "Albareth") is a massive military nation led by Zeref that is located in the continent of Alakitasia west of Ishgal.^{[ch. 444]} Having the strength of 730 guilds over Ishgal's 500,^{[ch. 439]} the empire's main objective is to forcibly obtain Mavis Vermillion's power of Fairy Heart to use against Acnologia.^{[ch. 445]} Zeref's personal guards, the Spriggan 12 (スプリガン12, Supurigan Tuerubu), possess powers that surpass Ishgal's supreme Wizard Saint, the eight-element Dragon Slayer God Serena, who defects to join the Spriggan 12 in a bid to fight Acnologia.^{[ch. 440]}

Mashima considered the Spriggan 12 to be the strongest characters in the series,^{[vol. 52:185]} describing their abilities as "cheating magic" that other authors would generally avoid using to preserve the framework of the story.^{[vol. 56:189]} While determining the number of members, Mashima argued against his editor's suggestion of using five or six members as opposed to twelve, citing "a bit of a secret reason for it".^{[vol. 52:185]} He designed Jacob after an actor he "really liked", and bemoaned that the character's role was smaller than he had initially planned.^{[vol. 56:189]} Mashima also commented on the popularity of the 12's female members, particularly Brandish, while considering Jacob to be his personal favorite.^{[vol. 60:185]} Irene's role as the "mother of Dragon Slayers" was determined by Mashima "well before" her debut, but he did not decide on her relationship with Erza until after the former's confrontation with Acnologia, which he noted created holes in the story.^{[vol. 60:188]} Following the conclusion of the series, Mashima specified Brandish as the character he would miss drawing the most.

August (オーガスト, Ōgasuto)
Voiced by: Yoshito Yasuhara, Natsumi Fujiwara (child) (Japanese); Bruce DuBose, Brittany Lauda (child) (English)
The Spriggan 12's elderly general and strongest member,^{[ch. 451, 493]} as well as Zeref and Mavis's unknown son who instantly acquires any "caster-type" spell he sees via copying magic.^{[ch. 526]}
Irene Belserion (アイリーン・ベルセリオン, Airīn Beruserion)
Voiced by: Takako Honda (Japanese); Rachel Robinson (English)
A member of the Spriggan 12. She is Erza Scarlet's centuries-old "dragonified" mother and the inventor of Dragon Slayer magic,^{[ch. 513, 514]} who infuses magic power into any object or person.^{[ch. 489]}
Larcade Dragneel (ラーケイド・ドラグニル, Rākeido Doraguniru)
Voiced by: Kenshō Ono (Japanese); Jason Liebrecht (English)
A member of the Spriggan 12. He is an Etherious convinced that he is Zeref's child,^{[ch. 526]} whose magic exploits humans' cardinal desires.^{[ch. 508-512]}
Brandish μ (ブランディッシュ・μ, Burandisshu Myū)
Voiced by: Manami Numakura (Japanese); Amber Lee Connors (English)
A member of the Spriggan 12. She is a young woman who can alter the size and mass of anything.^{[ch. 443]}
Invel Yura (インベル・ユラ, Inberu Yura)
Voiced by: Tomoaki Maeno (Japanese); Clay Wheeler (English)
A member of the Spriggan 12. He is an ice wizard who serves as the groups chief of staff and can "freeze" people's minds to control their thoughts.^{[ch. 494]}
DiMaria Yesta (ディマリア・イエスタ, Dimaria Iesuta)
Voiced by: Natsumi Fujiwara (Japanese); Meli Grant (English)
A member of the Spriggan 12. She is a swordswoman whose "God Soul" Takeover contains the form and time-stopping abilities of the god Chronos.^{[ch. 474]}
Ajeel Raml (アジィール・ラムル, Ajiīru Ramuru; also "Rommul")
Voiced by: Hiromichi Tezuka (Japanese); Josh Bangle (English)
A member of the Spriggan 12. He is a sand wizard who produces city-engulfing sandstorms.^{[ch. 446]}
Wall Eehto (ワール・イーヒト, Wāru Īhito)
Voiced by: Yō Kitazawa (Japanese); Derick Snow (English)
A member of the Spriggan 12. He is a robotic alchemist who constructs mechanical soldiers that exploit others' weaknesses.^{[ch. 459]}
Bloodman (ブラッドマン, Buraddoman; also "Bradman")
Voiced by: Kenichirou Matsuda (Japanese); Brad Hawkins (English)
A member of the Spriggan 12. He is a shinigami-like being who shares the same powers as the elite members of Tartaros.^{[ch. 452]}
Jacob Lessio (ジェイコブ・レッシオ, Jeikobu Resshio)
Voiced by: Makoto Tamura (Japanese); Bryan Massey (English)
A member of the Spriggan 12. He uses invisibility and spatial magic.^{[ch. 478]}
Neinhart (ナインハルト, Nainharuto)
Voiced by: Kōsuke Ōnishi (Japanese); Kyle Igneczi (English)
A member of the Spriggan 12. He is able to create lifelike fabrications of deceased people from others' memories.^{[ch. 481]}
God Serena (ゴッドセレナ, Goddo Serena)
Voiced by: Kazuyuki Okitsu (Japanese); David Matranga (English)
God Serena was a member of the Ten Wizard Saints, and was ranked first in terms of strength among the Four Gods of Ishgar, making him the strongest Mage on the entire continent. He later became a part of the Alvarez Empire, wherein he was one of the Spriggan 12, under the command of Emperor Spriggan. After dying at the hands of Acnologia, his corpse was re-animated as an Alchemical Doll by Duke Barbaroa of the guild Gold Owl. His epithet is Eight-Dragon God Serena (八竜のゴッドセレナ, Hachiryū no Goddo Serena), stemming from his use of eight different Dragon Slaying Lacrima.

=== Five God Dragons ===
The Five God Dragons (五神竜, Goshinryū); lit Five God Dragons are a group of dragons who survived the Dragon King Festival by fleeing to Guiltina to hide from Acnologia. Since then, they are each considered to have become as strong as Acnologia, and are viewed as deities by Guiltina's citizens. Several of the dragons have the ability to assume humanoid forms. To prevent them from causing a potential catastrophe, the object of the 100 Years Quest is for wizards to seal the dragons away.

Ignia (イグニア, Igunia)
Voiced by: Nobuhiko Okamoto (Japanese); Alejandro Saab (English)
The Fire Dragon God (炎神竜, Enjinryū) and Igneel's biological son, who is notorious in Guiltina for burning down countless countries. Having trained himself to defeat Acnologia as a test of strength, he becomes determined to turn Natsu into a worthy opponent for himself upon learning of his foster brother's victory over Acnologia, disappointed by Natsu's reliance on his friends' power.
Mercphobia (メルクフォビア, Merukufobia)
Voiced by: Yuichiro Umehara (Japanese); Aaron Campbell (English)
The Water Dragon God (水神竜, Suijinryū), worshiped by the people of the seaside town Ermina for his power over the ocean. He is a peaceful dragon who abandoned his cruel and violent nature after befriending a human girl named Karameel, whom he lives with. However, his diminishing control over his magic causes the tide to submerge Ermina at night, leading him to transform its citizens into fish to help them survive.
Aldoron (アルドロン, Arudoron)
The Wood Dragon God (木神竜, Mokushinryū), whose gargantuan body serves as the foundation of Drasil, (Note: The name is derived from "Draseal", a portmanteau of "dragon" and "seal".) Guiltina's largest city. Each of Drasil's five towns houses an orb that seals his destructive power, with Faris and Diabolos being misled by false claims that destroying the orbs would weaken him. He is protected by humanoid trees called "God Seeds" that possess various powers, with the strongest serving as Aldoron's brain and avatar.
Selene (セレーネ, Serēne)
Voiced by: Nana Mizuki (Japanese); Natalie Van Sistine (English)
The Moon Dragon God (月神竜, Gesshinryū), who possesses power over the moon and stars, as well as the ability to freely travel between different parallel worlds. She desires to be reborn as a human, and manipulates Faris and Diabolos into helping her eliminate the other Dragon Gods to achieve her goal, entertaining herself with the ensuing destruction in the process.
Viernes (ビエルネス, Bierunesu)
The Gold Dragon God (金神竜, Kinjinryū), who has the power to turn everything around him into gold. He exists as a concept after sacrificing his physical form to merge his will with the alchemist guild Gold Owl.
Dogramag (ドグラマグ, Doguramagu)
A sixth Dragon God whom Elefseria defeated prior to issuing the 100 Years Quest. As the Earth Dragon God (土神竜, Doshinryū), his remains are the source of an underground labyrinth called the Great Labyrinth of Dogra, which is made of indestructible stone.

=== Diabolos ===
Diabolos (ディアボロス, Diaborosu) is a guild of "fifth-generation" Dragon Slayers called Dragon Eaters who gain their abilities by consuming dragons. Their strongest force is the Dark Dragon Slayer Knights (黒滅竜騎団, Koku Metsuryū Kidan), a team of four Dragon Eaters who were given the powers of dragons killed by their master, Georg.

Georg Reizen (ゲオルグ・ライゼン, Georugu Raizen)
Voiced by: Yasuhiro Mamiya (Japanese); Marcus M. Mauldin (English)
The master of Diabolos.
Suzaku (スザク)
One of the Dark Dragon Slayer Knights. Suzaki is a swordsman with archaic speech patterns who uses sword techniques that move faster than the naked eye.
Misaki (ミサキ)
One of the Dark Dragon Slayer Knights. Misaki is a woman with the telekinetic ability to tear objects.
Haku (ハク)
One of the Dark Dragon Slayer Knights. Haku is a young boy who manipulates yarn and transforms others into plush dolls.
Kirin (キリン)
One of the Dark Dragon Slayer Knights. Kirin is a man who controls air and carries a coffin on his back.
Kiria (キリア)
Voiced by: Yumi Uchiyama (Japanese); Morgan Garrett (English)
A woman who creates magical blades that cut through anything.
Madmole (マッドモール, Maddomōru)
Voiced by: Itaru Yamamoto (Japanese); William Ofoegbu (English)
An armored man with an indestructible body.
Skullion Raider (スカリオン・レイダー, Sukarion Reidā)
Voiced by: Kenji Hamada (Japanese); Sean Letourneau (English)
A man who uses ash-based magic to create and disintegrate objects.
Nebaru (ネバル)
Voiced by: Yu Taniguchi (Japanese); Orion Pitts (English)
A bestial man with spider-like abilities.
Wraith (レイス, Reisu; also "Reiss")
Voiced by: Daiki Kobayashi (Japanese); Jessie James Grelle (English)
A spirit who is imperceptible to anyone except other Dragon Slayers.

=== Moonlight Divinities ===
The Moonlight Divinities (月下美神, Gekkabishin) are Selene's allies in the world of Elentear. They use an ability different from magic and curses known as Spirit Arts (霊術, Reijutsu), which cannot be countered by magic. The members include:

Yoko (ヨウコ, Yōko)
A young woman who can summon an infinite army of yōkai to fight for her. She is also able to turn others and herself into yōkai.
Mimi (ミミ)
A muscular woman with tremendous physical strength.
Hakune (ハクネ)
A woman who manipulates snow and is able to freeze anything, including the sources of other forms of power.

=== Gold Owl ===
Gold Owl (黄金の梟(ゴールドオウル), Gōrudo Ōru) is an alchemist guild founded by the real Duke which is later taken over by Viernes's disembodied will. Among its members is an alchemically created duplicate of God Serena.^{Ch. 114} Fire & Flame's Signario Sisters were made to serve as members of the Guild due to being mind controlled by Viernes, but were freed after his death.^{Ch. 153, 156} Additionally, the White Wizard Athena was convinced to join the Guild, in hopes of using her power against the other Dragon Gods.^{Ch. 136}

Duke Barbaroa (デューク・バルバロア, Dūku Barubaroa)
An apparition of Elefseria's apprentice Duke serves as Viernes's voice and the master of Gold Owl.
Gennai (ゲンナイ) and Kotetsu (コウテツ, Kōtetsu)
Two artificial humans who transmute materials into smoke and steel, respectively.
Sai (サイ)
A man who is capable of switching people's bodies with others' as a means of sealing their power.
Athena II (アテナⅡ, Atena Ⅱ)
An emotionless doll made by Duke to replace the original Athena using stolen Dragon Slayer Magic.^{Ch. 139}

=== Fire & Flame ===
Fire and Flame (炎神会(ファイア&フレイム), Faia & Fureimu) are a dark guild on Guiltina composed of fire wizards, their guild master being Ignia.^{Ch. 156, 157} They are seeking to carry out a "True Dragon King Festival", during which they will create a "Dragon World".^{Ch. 161, 162} This involves using roots created by Dogramag to awaken the previously suppressed full power of the Five Dragon Gods, reviving the deceased Aldoron and Viernes in the process, and to turn the people of Guiltina, including themselves, into Dragons.^{Ch. 163, 164, 165}

Bestia (ベスティア, Besutia)
Bestia is the leader of Fire & Flame below Ignia, who wields a unique type of fire and a handful of magic, including being able to teleport herself and others into another dimension, as well as being able to unleash a darkness which she says would be too dangerous to release outside of her dimension. Her fire is suspected to be able to awaken Natsu's own power were he to consume it.^{Ch. 177, 178}
Wed (ウェド, Wedo)
Ignia's armored second-in-command and Guiltina's strongest sword fighter who seeks to prove his strength against Erza.^{Ch. 158, 159} He's later revealed to be Ignia's son with a human, whose name stands for Warm Earth Dragon (暖かい・大地の・竜, Attakai Daichi no Ryū), who looks down on his humanity and sought to be a Dragon.^{Ch. 177}
Signario Sisters (シグナリオ姉妹, Shigunario Shimai)
A pair of Alchemist sisters, the younger sister named Luso (ルソー, Rusō) and the older sister named Ennie (エニー, Enī), who can transmute materials into fire.^{Ch. 184} They also wield a unique type of magic that, through Dogramag's roots, can turn people, including themselves, into dragons and allowed for the restoration of the Dragon Gods' full power. Ennie can also transmute her attire into armor and create weapons, similar to Requip Magic.^{Ch. 146, 184} While under Viernes' control, the sisters were shown to be able to transmute the world around them; Luso specializing in abstract psych pop locations and Ennie creating hellish landscapes.^{Ch. 132, 139}
Lecka (レッカ, Rekka)
A man who uses Fire Make Magic.^{Ch. 158}
Brian (ブライアン, Buraian)
A man who can sprout mouths on different parts of his body, allowing him to eat fire.^{Ch. 156, 158}
Raj (ラージュ, Rāju)
An illusionist who uses fire to create illusions.^{Ch. 159}
Misfortune (ミスフォーチュン, Misufōchun)
A fiery cat who can take on the appearance of a firebird. She has friendly interactions with Happy.^{Ch. 161, 162} She joined Fire & Flame since no one else could touch her fiery body without being harmed, but is convinced by Happy to help Fairy Tail against Ignia.^{Ch. 170}

=== Black Wizards ===
A group led by Earth Land's Faris (ファリス, Farisu), the counterpart of the Faris from Elentear, who gained power from Acnologia's left arm which Igneel had torn off; becoming the embodiment of Acnologia's will, the Black Wizard (黒魔導士, Kuro Madōshi).^{Ch. 162, 163} She seeks to eradicate all humans and dragons in order to replace them with Black Wizards.^{Ch. 165}

To assist her, she created the Oración Sechs (悪祈六書(オラシオンゼクス), Orashion Zekusu), demons from books she wrote, much like Zeref's Etherious.^{Ch. 164, 165, 174} Amongst their ranks is Zero, the former guild master of the Oración Seis, who survived his apparent death and was turned into a demon by absorbing magic from Nirvana.^{Ch. 165, 171}

Gaia (ガイア, Gaia)
A bulky, rocky demon who is fixated on love and is capable of detonating the earth to attack opponents.^{Ch. 165, 184}
Gate (ゲート, Gēto)
A horned, well-dressed demon who can open a gate through which horrifying creatures emerge.^{Ch. 165, 174, 185}
Daemon (デーモン, Dēmon)
A female demon who controls acid through cards and often says the word "melt".^{Ch. 165, 175}
Blade (ブレイド, Bureido)
A mind reading demon whose black magic allows him to slash his Demonic Blade, which can cut through anything, without making noise.^{Ch. 165, 175, 185}
Bird (バード, Bādo)
A bird-like demon who often incorporates bird-related puns in his speech and uses his bird body to attack opponents, while also using his magic to hide within darkness so he can perform sneak attacks.^{Ch. 165, 174, 175}

== Supporting characters ==
=== Blue Pegasus ===
Blue Pegasus (青い天馬(ブルーペガサス), Burū Pegasasu) is one of Fiore's official guilds consisting mostly of attractive men and women.^{[ch. 139]} Its master is a cross-dressing man named Bob (ボブ, Bobu).^{[ch. 15]} Blue Pegasus is usually represented by its ace member and black sheep, Ichiya Vandalay Kotobuki (一夜 = ヴァンダレイ = 寿, Ichiya-Vandarei-Kotobuki), a stout, handsome man who uses magical perfumes that produce a variety of effects such as superhuman strength and speed.^{[ch. 139, 161, 276]} He is joined by the Tri-men (トライメンズ, Toraimenzu; "Trimens"), a trio of host wizards who cater to women.^{[ch. 131]} Hibiki Lates (ヒビキ・レイティス, Hibiki Reitisu) uses magic resembling a computer terminal that can archive and telepathically transfer information to others;^{[ch. 139, 140]} Eve Tearm (イヴ・ティルム, Ivu Tirumu) can magically produce blizzards;^{[ch. 143]} and Ren Akatsuki (レン・アカツキ) is a tanned wizard who manipulates air and later marries the Lamia Scale member Sherry Blendy.^{[ch. 142, 421]} Ichiya and the Tri-men participate in the Grand Magic Games with two other members: Jenny Realite (ジェニー・リアライト, Jenī Riaraito),^{[ch. 279]} a fashion model capable of using a variety of Takeover magic called Machina Soul (機械(マキナソウル), Makina Sōru) to record machinery and transform into outfits with the same functions;^{[ch. 362]} and Nichiya (ニチヤ), an Exceed guard captain from Extalia and Ichiya's counterpart from Edolas.^{[ch. 293]} Other members of the guild include Laxus Dreyar and the Raijin Tribe, who temporarily join Blue Pegasus during Fairy Tail's dissolution;^{[ch. 443]} and Karen Lilica (カレン・リリカ, Karen Ririka), a celestial wizard and Loke's first owner, who is killed by the Oración Seis' member Sorano three years before he meets Lucy Heartfilia.^{[ch. 73]}

=== Lamia Scale ===
Lamia Scale (蛇姫の鱗(ラミアスケイル), Ramia Sukeiru) is one of Fiore's legal guilds, led by a cantankerous old woman named Ohba Babasaama (オーバ・バサーマ, Ōba Babasāma).^{[ch. 263]} It is famous in the kingdom for its ace member Jura Neekis (ジュラ・ネェキス, Jura Neekisu), a member of the Ten Wizard Saints who turns soil into iron-hard rock columns.^{[ch. 137]} A trio of defectors from the guild oppose Fairy Tail as Lyon Vastia's followers to take revenge against the demon Deliora for killing their families: the love-obsessed woman Sherry Blendy;^{[ch. 27]} Yuka Suzuki (ユウカ・スズキ, Yūka Suzuki; also "Yûka"), a man with large eyebrows who produces magic-nullifying pulses from his hands;^{[ch. 32]} and Toby Horhorta (トビー・オルオルタ, Tobī Oruoruta; also "Orrolta"), a dimwitted man dressed like a dog who has extendible, paralyzing claws.^{[ch. 33]} During Fairy Tail's disbandment, Wendy Marvell and Carla temporarily join Lamia Scale, with the former partnering with Sherry's God Slayer cousin Sherria Blendy (シェリア・ブレンディ, Sheria Burendi) as the Sky Sisters (天空シスターズ, Tenkū Shisutāzu).^{[ch. 420]}

==== Lyon Vastia ====
Voiced by: Yuki Kaji (Japanese); Jerry Jewell (English)

Lyon Vastia (リオン・バスティア, Rion Basutia), spelled "Bastia" in the English anime dub, is Gray Fullbuster's rival and senior disciple under Ur. He practices Ice Make magic like Gray, using a variation that produces "living" ice golems he controls on command.^{[ch. 30]} He initially uses a single-handed casting gesture that allows him to conjure ice faster,^{[ch. 30]} but makes it weaker and imbalanced.^{[ch. 41]} Lyon resents Gray for causing Ur's sacrifice against the demon Deliora, ruining his childhood dream of surpassing their teacher.^{[ch. 38]} Operating under the name "Reitei" (零帝; "Sub-zero Emperor"), Lyon brings Deliora to Galuna Island to release the demon, intending to defeat it and prove his superiority over Ur.^{[ch. 29]} After discovering Deliora's death upon its release,^{[ch. 43]} Lyon decides to move on by joining Lamia Scale,^{[ch. 46]} becoming a cornerstone member of the guild.^{[ch. 132]} He also adopts the two-handed casting gesture Ur and Gray use, as well as Gray's stripping habit.^{[ch. 139]} Seven years later, Lyon humorously falls in love at first sight with Juvia Lockser, forming a love triangle with her and Gray;^{[ch. 256]} he later concedes her feelings for Gray after the latter is killed and resurrected by Ultear Milkovich.^{[ch. 335, 338]} Following the character's initial role, Mashima commented that he enjoyed drawing Lyon again after his absence.^{[vol. 16:185]}

==== Sherry Blendy ====
Voiced by: Yuka Iguchi (Japanese); Trina Nishimura (English)

Sherry Blendy (シェリー・ブレンディ, Sherī Burendi), spelled "Blendi" in the English anime dub, is a love-obsessed woman whose romantic interest she feels for Lyon Vastia is unrequited.^{[ch. 33]} She also owns a giant rat named Angelica (アンジェリカ, Anjerika).^{[ch. 27]} Sherry's magic Doll Attack (人形撃, Ningyōgeki), renamed "Marionette Attack" in the English anime dub, allows her to manipulate non-human objects and beings, including Celestial spirits.^{[ch. 33]} Once a member of Lamia Scale, she leaves the guild to be one of Lyon's followers to take revenge against the demon Deliora for killing her family.^{[ch. 44]} Sherry later cleans up her act and rejoins Lamia Scale alongside Lyon,^{[ch. 132]} only to eventually leave again when she becomes engaged and then married to the Blue Pegasus' member Ren Akatsuki.^{[ch. 357, 421]}

=== Saber Tooth ===
Saber Tooth (剣咬の虎(セイバートゥース), Seibā Tūsu; also "Sabertooth") is a guild that replaces Fairy Tail during their seven-year disappearance as the most powerful guild in Fiore.^{[ch. 258]} Led by its master, Ziemma (ジエンマ, Jienma),^{[ch. 281]} the guild is represented by its five most powerful wizards for much of the Grand Magic Games: Minerva Orland, Ziemma's daughter;^{[ch. 281]} the Twin Dragons (双竜, Sōryū) team formed by Sting Eucliffe and Rogue Cheney, third generation Dragon Slayers who are raised by dragons and given lacrima implants;^{[ch. 265]} Olga Nanagia (オルガ・ナナギア, Oruga Nanagia), a God Slayer who produces black lightning similar to Laxus Dreyar;^{[ch. 273]} and Rufus Lore (ルーファス・ロア, Rūfasu Roa), a masked man who uses Memory Make (記憶造形, メモリーメイク, Memorī Meiku) to create new spells based on those he memorizes.^{[ch. 270]} After Saber Tooth is defeated by Fairy Tail in the Grand Magic Games, Sting replaces Ziemma as guild master.^{[ch. 338]} One year after the battle with the Alvarez Empire, Yukino's older sister and Oración Seis member Sorano joins Saber Tooth to reunite with Yukino.

==== Sting Eucliffe ====
Voiced by: Takahiro Sakurai (Japanese); Michael Jones (English)

Sting Eucliffe (スティング・ユークリフ, Sutingu Yūkurifu), also called "White Dragon" Sting (白竜のスティング, Hakuryū no Sutingu), is a Dragon Slayer and one of the Twin Dragons with Rogue Cheney.^{[ch. 258]} He performs White Dragon Slayer Magic (白の滅竜魔法, Haku no Metsuryū Mahō), which gives him the ability to produce attacks of sacred light and fire laser beams from his mouth. He can also activate Dragon Force at will.^{[ch. 294, 295]} He appears to use this magic to kill his dragon guardian, Weisslogia (バイスロギア, Baisurogia), at the dragon's behest, to prove himself a "true" Dragon Slayer;^{[ch. 265]} Weisslogia later appears alive with the other Dragon Slayers' guardians, explaining that Sting had been given false memories of killing him to provide him with experience.^{[ch. 415]} To fulfill a vow to his Exceed friend Lector (レクター, Rekutā), Sting aims to defeat Natsu Dragneel and prove to others that he killed a dragon.^{[ch. 295]} During their two-on-two fight alongside Rogue and Gajeel Redfox, Sting is defeated by Natsu and gains new respect for Fairy Tail,^{[ch. 296]} succeeding Ziemma as Saber Tooth's master to improve his guild's image.^{[ch. 338]} During the Alvarez war, Sting is revealed to be part of the five dragon slayers sent through Eclipse from four hundred years ago to defeat Acnologia.^{[ch. 465]}

==== Rogue Cheney ====
Voiced by: Kenichi Suzumura (Japanese); Garret Storms (English)

Rogue Cheney (ローグ・チェーニ, Rōgu Chēni), also known as "Shadow Dragon" Rogue (影竜のローグ, Eiryū no Rōgu), is Sting Eucliffe's partner.^{[ch. 258]} His Shadow Dragon Slayer Magic (影の滅竜魔法, Kage no Metsuryū Mahō) techniques include turning himself into a shadow to become intangible and firing shadows from his mouth.^{[ch. 294, 296]} Like Sting, Rogue can activate Dragon Force at will, and has false memories of killing his own dragon guardian, Skiadram (スキアドラム, Sukiadoramu). He is accompanied by Frosch (フロッシュ, Furosshu), a green Exceed who wears a pink frog costume.^{[ch. 258]} During Gajeel Redfox's membership in Phantom Lord, Rogue apprentices himself to him under the name Lios (ライオス, Raiosu) out of distaste for his own name, but becomes disillusioned when Gajeel joins Fairy Tail. After losing to Gajeel in the Grand Magic Games seven years later, Rogue acknowledges that Saber lacks the camaraderie Fairy Tail has, and joins Sting in improving his own guild.^{[ch. 338]}

During the tournament, a version of Rogue appears through the time travel gate Eclipse from an alternate future, corrupted by his inner evil after Frosch is killed by Gray Fullbuster in his timeline. "Future" Rogue combines his shadow magic with Sting's White Dragon Slayer Magic forcibly acquired after killing him in the future.^{[ch. 325]} He tricks Hisui E. Fiore by advising her to use the time travel gate Eclipse as a weapon to save the kingdom from a dragon invasion,^{[ch. 323]} setting the gate to allow seven dragons from the historical Dragon King Festival to appear in the present to be used against Acnologia.^{[ch. 326,328]} While Rogue's present self helps fight the dragons, Future Rogue's battle with Natsu ends with Eclipse's destruction, returning Rogue and the dragons to their original time periods, but not before Rogue helps Natsu avert his own future by warning him of Frosch's fate.^{[ch. 337]}

During the Alvarez war, Rogue is revealed to be part of the five dragon slayers sent through Eclipse from four hundred years ago to defeat Acnologia. ^{[ch. 465]}

==== Yukino Agria ====
Voiced by: Fuyuka Oura (Japanese); Mallorie Rodak (English)

Yukino Agria (ユキノ・アグリア, Yukino Aguria) is a novice Saber Tooth member and Celestial Wizard who owns the zodiac spirits Pisces, Libra, and Ophiuchus.^{[ch. 280]} She is humiliated and temporarily expelled from the guild by Ziemma after losing to Kagura Mikazuchi in the Grand Magic Games,^{[ch. 281]} but is reinstated by Sting after the tournament;^{[ch. 338]} in the interim, Yukino aids the kingdom's Eclipse Project as a provisional sergeant, hoping to prevent the childhood abduction of her older sister, Sorano.^{[ch. 303]} Yukino later reunites with Sorano during the war against the Alvarez Empire.

==== Minerva Orland ====
Voiced by: Kikuko Inoue (Japanese); Anastasia Muñoz (English)

Minerva Orland (ミネルバ・オーランド, Mineruba Ōrando) is Ziemma's daughter, who endures harsh training from her father at childhood to become Saber Tooth's most powerful wizard, giving her the same superiority complex as him.^{[ch. 388]} Her Territory (絶対領土(テリトリー), Teritorī) magic grants her the ability to teleport and attack anything in her field of vision;^{[ch. 321]} she also practices a set of highly destructive spells called the Magics of the Yakuma Eighteen Battle Gods (ヤクマ十八闘神魔法, Yakuma Jūhachi Tōjin Mahō).^{[ch. 312]} She leaves Saber Tooth to exact revenge against Erza Scarlet after losing to her in the Grand Magic Games,^{[ch. 343]} which eventually leads her to be inducted into Tartaros as a demon named Neo-Minerva (ネオ・ミネルバ, Neo Mineruba).^{[ch. 370]} After realizing the pointlessness of her rivalry with Erza, a reformed Minerva is rescued by Sting and Rogue, restored to her original form, and reinstated into Saber Tooth.^{[ch. 388, 416]}

=== Crime Sorcière ===
Crime Sorcière (魔女の罪(クリムソルシエール), Kurimu Sorushiēru; French for "Witch's Crime") is an independent guild formed during the disappearance of Sirius Island. Its stated goal is to root out Zeref, and suppress anyone who attempts to use his power for evil. It acts under the Magic Council's radar. It initially consists of its three founding members—Jellal Fernandes, Ultear Milkovich, and Merudy—as a means of atoning for their lifelong misdeeds.^{[ch. 263]} After Ultear's departure, the guild recruits Brain's followers from the Oración Seis as members.^{[ch. 339, 416]} The guild is later legally pardoned of their past crimes by Hisui E. Fiore following the battle with Alvarez Empire.^{[ch. 545]}

==== Jellal Fernandes ====
Voiced by: Daisuke Namikawa (Japanese); Robert McCollum, Terri Doty (child) (English)

Forced to work in the Tower of Heaven as a slave by a cult of Zeref worshipers who aim to revive the black wizard, Jellal Fernandes (ジェラール・フェルナンデス, Jerāru Ferunandesu) is manipulated by Ultear Milkovich into serving Zeref under the guise of his spirit,^{[ch. 102]} prompting Jellal to turn on his childhood friend Erza Scarlet and takes over the tower's construction.^{[ch. 83]} At some point, he is appointed a member of the Magic Council and one of the Ten Wizard Saints as Siegrain (ジークレイン, Jīkurein), a psychic projection of himself.^{[ch. 1, 48, 95]} Using Heavenly Body Magic (天体魔法, Tentai Mahō) techniques, Jellal can boost his speed to imperceptible levels, and produce powerful energy-based attacks akin to falling meteors.^{[ch. 96]} Masquerading as Jellal's good twin brother, "Siegrain" tricks the other Council members into firing Etherion at the tower, allowing it to absorb the weapon's magic energy to become operational.^{[ch. 94]} He then attempts to sacrifice Erza to reincarnate Zeref, killing their friend Simon in a duel against Natsu Dragneel. He is defeated after Natsu consumes Etherion's residual energy to achieve Dragon Force, and is seemingly killed after the tower's destruction.^{[ch. 97-101]} He is later found alive by the Oración Seis and revived to serve the dark guild, but suffers from amnesia and is shocked to learn of his past misdeeds from Erza.^{[ch. 136, 145]} Despite fighting the Seis with Fairy Tail to atone for his actions, Jellal is arrested by the Magic Council and detained.^{[ch. 162]} He eventually regains his memories before being liberated by Ultear and Merudy, who join him in penance by forming Crime Sorcière.^{[ch. 263]} Reconciling with Erza afterwards, she expresses her feelings for him which he does reciprocate. Jellal, however, decides to not enter a relationship with her as he believes he is unworthy of her due to his past sins. He is eventually pardoned of his fugitive status by Hisui. Hiro Mashima created Jellal as a "self-parody" of his previous series Rave Master, modeling the character's appearance after Sieg Hart.^{[vol. 3:afterword]}

==== Ultear Milkovich ====
Voiced by: Miyuki Sawashiro, Seirō Ogino (Zalty) (Japanese); Lydia Mackay, Kara Edwards (child), Mark Stoddard (Zalty) (English)

During her early childhood, Ultear Milkovich (ウルティア・ミルコビッチ, Urutia Mirukobitchi; named after "Ur's tear") is taken to a magic research facility by her mother Ur. She is subjected to unethical experiments and assumes that Ur has abandoned her, unaware that her mother thinks she has died.^{[ch. 46, 241]} Ultear joins forces with Grimoire Heart to modify her magic with Zeref's power to travel to the past and exact revenge on Ur.^{[ch. 240]} Ultear eventually gains infamy as the leader of the guild's Seven Kin of Purgatory and adopts Merudy. As part of Grimoire Heart's plan, she manipulates Jellal Fernandes into becoming the dark wizard's servant, feigning loyalty to him as a member of the Magic Council.^{[ch. 46]} Later, Ultear and Merudy capture Zeref on Sirius Island, and the two attempt to flee with the dark wizard.^{[ch. 239]} Eventually, Ultear realizes the truth about her mother while dueling with Gray Fullbuster, prompting her to help Fairy Tail defeat her master Hades and leave Grimoire Heart with Merudy.^{[ch. 241, 248, 250]} Seven years later, when Rogue Cheney's future self uses Eclipse to orchestrate a dragon attack, Ultear contemplates killing the present Rogue. However, she casts the forbidden time spell Last Ages (ラストエイジス, Rasuto Eijisu), which reverses time and allows her allies to foresee the dragons' moves within this critical time frame, preventing the deaths of several wizards.^{[ch. 333-335]} The spell also rapidly ages Ultear into an elderly woman, and she leaves Jellal and Merudy to assume that she has been killed in the attack.^{[ch. 339]}

==== Merudy ====
Voiced by: Saori Gotō (Japanese); Bryn Apprill (English)

Adopted and raised by Ultear Milkovich as a survivor of her hometown's destruction, Merudy (メルディ, Merudi), spelled "Meldy" in the English dub, becomes one of Grimoire Heart's Seven Kin of Purgatory.^{[ch. 230]} She uses the Lost Magic Magilty Sense (マギルティ = センス, Magiruti-Sensu) to synchronize the physical senses and emotions of two or more people,^{[ch. 229, 230]} and the spell Magilty Sodom (マギルティ = ソドム, Magiruti-Sodomu) to produce blades of light that directly affect their target's sense of pain.^{[ch. 225]} She participates in her guild's hunt for Fairy Tail's members on Sirius Island, making Gray Fullbuster her primary target, blaming him for hurting Ultear through Ur's death.^{[ch. 228]} After dueling Juvia Lockser to a stalemate, Merudy threatens suicide to kill Gray through her sensory link, but Juvia convinces her to stay alive for Ultear's sake.^{[ch. 230]} Merudy later learns of Ultear's role in her hometown's destruction from her guildmate Zancrow,^{[ch. 242]} After rescuing Ultear from attempting suicide, Merudy leaves Grimoire Heart with her.^{[ch. 250]} Mashima designed Merudy to be the weakest of the Seven Kin, and was surprised to find the character had become "extremely popular" with the series's younger readers.^{[vol. 26:afterword]} He wrote that the character's name "just sort of came to [him]"; he later realized that it was the same as a character from "an old RPG [he] used to play".^{[vol. 27:extra]}

=== Mermaid Heel ===
Mermaid Heel (人魚の踵(マーメイドヒール), Māmeido Hīru) is an all-female official guild in Fiore. The members of the guild include: the swordswoman Kagura Mikazuchi;^{[ch. 267]} the cat-lover Millianna (ミリアーナ, Miriāna), who befriends Erza Scarlet as a slave of the Tower of Heaven and can conjure magical ropes capable of incapacitating a person;^{[ch. 76]} Araña Webb (アラーニャ・ウェブ, Arānya Webu), a spider-themed wizard capable of generate webs from her hands;^{[ch. 273]} Lisley Law (リズリー・ロー, Rizurī Rō), an overweight woman who can alter her own gravity and body mass using her magic;^{[ch. 276]} and Beth Vanderwood (ベス・バンダーウッド, Besu Bandāuddo), a country girl whose magic allows her to sprout vegetables and fruits from the ground and fight with them.^{[ch. 370]}

==== Kagura Mikazuchi ====
Voiced by: Saori Hayami (Japanese); Jenny Ledel (English)

Kagura Mikazuchi (カグラ・ミカヅチ) is the most powerful member of Mermaid Heel.^{[ch. 280]} In her childhood, Kagura is rescued by Erza Scarlet during a raid on her hometown Rosemary Village (ローズマリーィ村, Rōzumarī Mura), caused by a bunch of Zeref's followers responsible for enslaving not only Erza but her older brother Simon at the Tower of Heaven.^{[ch. 314]} She deeply resents Jellal Fernandes for murdering Simon, and vows to avenge him by killing Jellal;^{[ch. 314]} she forges her katana Archenemy (不倶戴天, Fugutaiten) for the single purpose of assassinate him, as it can create shockwaves powerful enough to destroy landscapes.^{[ch. 315]} Kagura is also able to manipulate the gravity of an area with ease using her Gravity Change (重力変化, Jūryoku Henka) magic.^{[ch. 280]} During the battle with Alvarez Empire, Kagura abandons her resentment for Jellal and rescues him from drowning.^{[ch. 481]}

==== Millianna ====
Voiced by: Yukiyo Fujii (Japanese); Alexis Tipton (English)

Millianna (ミリアーナ, Miriāna) is a cat-loving girl who uses a rope to bind other wizards' magic.^{[ch. 76]} She joins Mermaid Heel to take revenge against Jellal and improve her magic skills. ^{[ch. 282]}^{[ch. 367]}

== Other characters ==
=== Kingdom of Fiore ===
The Kingdom of Fiore (フィオーレ王国, Fiōre Ōkoku) is a country in Ishgal that serves as the primary setting of Fairy Tail. Its king is Toma E. Fiore (トーマ・E・フィオーレ, Tōma Ī Fiōre), who also works incognito as "Mato" (マトーくん, Matō-kun), the pumpkin mascot of the kingdom's annual Grand Magic Games tournament.^{[ch. 325]} Toma's daughter, Princess Hisui E. Fiore (ヒスイ・E・フィオーレ, Hisui Ī Fiōre; hisui (翡翠) meaning jade), organizes the confidential "Eclipse Plan" that entails using Zeref's time travel gate Eclipse to travel back in time and kill him in his mortal state.^{[ch. 302]} Participating in Hisui's plan are Arcadios (アルカディオス, Arukadiosu), captain of the kingdom's Cherry Blossom Holy Knights, who publicly masquerades as the project's mastermind to protect Hisui; defense minister Darton (ダートン, Dāton), who opposes the plan for its ramifications on the timeline. Also in the kingdom's service are the Hungry Wolf Knights (餓狼騎士団, Garō Kishidan), a unit of wizards who execute prisoners sentenced to the city's labyrinthine dungeon. The designs for Hisui and the Hungry Wolf Knights sans their leader were submitted by readers as part of a character design contest in the book Chotto Moorimashita, with Hisui's design being the winner.^{[vol. 37:197]} Following Fairy Tail's battle with the Alvarez Empire, Hisui succeeds Toma as the kingdom's monarch.

=== Magic Council ===
The Magic Council (魔法評議院, Mahō Hyōgiin) is an organization that administers the legal guilds in Ishgal.^{[ch. 2]} Initially chaired by Crawford Theme (クロフォード・シーム, Kurofōdo Shīmu), the council's members have little tolerance for Fairy Tail's property-damaging tactics, despite their role in handling criminals and monsters that threaten the peace.^{[ch. 1]} Members of the council include Jellal Fernandes and Ultear Milkovich, two of its younger members.^{[ch. 1]} Another councilor, Yajima (ヤジマ), is Makarov Dreyar's longtime friend who speaks in Fairy Tail's defense.^{[ch. 69]} Other members include Org (オーグ, Ōgu), Michello (ミケロ, Mikero), Leiji (レイジ, Reiji), and Belno (ベルノ, Beruno). After Jellal and Ultear disgrace the council by tricking them into using the superweapon Etherion to activate the Tower of Heaven,^{[ch. 79]} the council is reformed under chairman Grand Doma (グラン・ドマ, Guran Doma; also "Gran Doma") to institute a tighter regime over the guilds.^{[ch. 200]} Members of the reformed council include Lahar (ラハール, Rahāru),^{[ch. 223]} an officer who commands one of the Rune Knights' custody units,^{[ch. 162]} and Mest Gryder, who operates under the name Doranbalt.^{[ch. 223]} Seven years later, Crawford betrays the council and informs Tartaros of Face, a cross-continental network of pulse bombs designed to eliminate all magic in Fiore.^{[ch. 363]} Tartaros assassinates most of the incumbent and retired councilors, three of whom serve as Face's unwitting wards; Crawford is killed after replacing Jellal as the last required seal. The open seats are filled by the Ten Wizard Saints, Makarov Dreyar and God Serena, consisting of vampiric wizard and chairman Draculos Hyberion (ドラキュロス・ハイベリオン, Dorakyurosu Haiberion); Wolfheim (ウルフヘイム, Urufuheimu), a diminutive man who turns into a hulking monster; Warrod Sequen; and Jura Neekis. Fairy Tail members Gajeel Redfox, Panther Lily, and Levy McGarden also enter the council's service as custody officers during the guild's temporary disbandment.

=== Celestial spirits ===
Celestial spirits (星霊, seirei) are beings that are contracted by celestial wizards to be summoned using enchanted keys called "Gatekeys" to battle and performed other tasks. They are governed by an all-powerful spirit called the Celestial Spirit King (星霊王, Seireiō), and are each named after and based on one of the 88 modern constellations. They are immortal and possess various magic powers and abilities, but lose their power when they remain outside their realm for extended periods of time, which is fatal to them.^{[ch. 72-74]}

Numerous spirits are summoned using store-bought silver keys,^{[ch. 4]} including Nikora (ニコラ, Nikora), a breed of "dog" spirits kept by celestial wizards as pets;^{[ch. 4]} Lucy keeps a Nikora that she names Plue (プルー, Purū), who is identical to the character of the same name from Hiro Mashima's earlier work, Rave Master. There are also twelve golden Gatekeys that summon more powerful spirits that are based on the zodiacal constellations,^{[ch. 4]} including Leo, the true form of Loke. Aquarius (アクエリアス, Akueriasu) is a cold mermaid who uses an urn that unleashes massive torrents of water on her target.^{[ch. 1]} Taurus (タウロス, Taurosu) is a perverted minotaur who wields a giant, double-edged battle axe and has superhuman strength.^{[ch. 4]} Cancer (キャンサー, Kyansā) is a humanoid hairdresser with six crab legs protruding from his back.^{[ch. 8]} Virgo (バルゴ, Barugo) is a masochistic woman dressed like a maid who burrows rapidly underground.^{[ch. 17]} Sagittarius (サジタリウス, Sajitariusu) is a tall man who wears a horse costume and possesses superb archery skills.^{[ch. 62]} Aries (アリエス, Ariesu) is a timid young woman with sheep horns who conjures wool clouds that subdue her opponents.^{[ch. 172]} Gemini (ジェミニ, Jemini) are small twin spirits who mimic the appearances and abilities of others,^{[ch. 133]} and can also read their minds.^{[ch. 143]} Scorpio (スコーピオン, Sukōpion) is a man with a scorpion tail-shaped cannon that produces gusts of sand.^{[ch. 172]} Capricorn (カプリコーン, Kapurikōn) is an anthropomorphic goat and martial artist who dresses like a butler.^{[ch. 248]} Pisces (ピスケス, Pisukesu) is a pair of mother and son fish who attack their opponent in tandem,^{[ch. 280]} and can assume a humanoid form.^{[ch. 310]} Libra (ライブラ, Raibura) is a belly dancer who manipulates gravity using a pair of weighing scales.^{[ch. 280]} Another spirit called Ophiuchus (オフィウクス, Ofiukusu), which takes the form of a giant mechanical snake, and is considered the "thirteenth" zodiac spirit.^{[ch. 280]}

=== Edolas ===
Edolas (エドラス, Edorasu) is a parallel universe that exists separately from Earth-land, the universe in which Fairy Tail takes place. It is inhabited by counterparts of Earth-land's residents, each with opposing personalities or traits such as age and species.^{[ch. 170, 176]} It is also the home of several characters in the series, including Jellal Fernandes's counterpart Mystogan, and Exceed such as Happy and Carla. As opposed to Earth-land, magic is a limited resource in Edolas and cannot be used as a natural ability by humans, who instead use items combined with magic-infused lacrima crystals;^{[ch. 172]} the Earth-land wizards are similarly only able to perform magic in Edolas after taking pills provided by Mystogan for this purpose.^{[ch. 180]}

The kingdom is ruled by King Faust (ファウスト, Fausuto), Mystogan's father,^{[ch. 190]} who replenishes his world's magic using inter-dimensional anima (アニマ, anima) portals that absorb magic power from Earth-land and crystallize it as lacrima.^{[ch. 169]} A version of Fairy Tail exists in Edolas as a dark guild because of Faust's abolition of wizard guilds. Among its members are Natsu Dragion (ナツ・ドラギオン, Natsu Doragion), Natsu Dragneel's timid counterpart and the guild's vehicle expert;^{[ch. 174]} Lucy Ashley (ルーシィ・アシュレイ, Rūshii Ashurei), a boyish and intimidating version of Lucy Heartfilia; Gray Sorloge (グレイ・ソルージュ, Gurei Sorūju), an overdressed version of Gray Fullbuster who harbors unrequited feelings for Juvia Lockser's counterpart; and a teenage version of Wendy Marvell.^{[ch. 170]} They are hunted by Edolas's royal military, which includes Panther Lily, commander of the first division; the second division's Erza Nightwalker (エルザ・ナイトウォーカー, Eruza Naitowōkā), Erza Scarlet's ruthless counterpart who wields a transforming spear based on Haru Glory's Ten Commandments sword from Rave Master;^{[ch. 180]} the third division's Hughes (ヒューズ, Hyūzu), who controls Faust's indoor amusement park attractions with a baton;^{[ch. 182]} the fourth division's Sugar Boy (シュガーボーイ, Shugā Bōi), whose sword can turn anything into liquid;^{[ch. 182]} chief of staff Byro (バイロ, Bairo), who carries various magical potions;^{[ch. 184]} and Coco (ココ, Koko), Byro's young, barefoot aide.^{[ch. 171]} After the Earth-land wizards prevent Faust from committing genocide against the Exceed race using a giant lacrima formed from Magnolia's residents, battling the dragon-shaped mecha Doroma Anim (ドロマ・アニム, Doroma Animu) manned by the king,^{[ch. 190]} Mystogan restores the city and reverses the anima's effects to return all of the stolen magic, permanently depleting Edolas's supply.^{[ch. 198]}

==== Exceed ====
The Exceed (エクシード, Ekushīdo) are a race of anthropomorphic cat-like beings from Edolas ruled by Queen Chagot (シャゴット, Shagotto), who has precognition. Residing on a floating island called Extalia (エクスタリア, Ekusutaria), they are the only residents of Edolas capable of possessing magic as a natural ability, which they use to produce wings and fly with the spell Aera. Because of this, they are seen as angels by the humans of Edolas, with Chagot revered as a god who passes judgment on humans.^{[ch. 176]} Most of the Exceed population resent humans, casting out any Exceed who sympathize with them or ignore their queen's orders.^{[ch. 185]} Despite this, they are actually a weak race with a history of being abused by humans, and their divinity is a ruse devised by Chagot's court to protect their people.^{[ch. 188]} Before their births, Happy and Carla's eggs are sent to Earth-land along with 98 other unborn Exceed under the pretense of hunting and killing Dragon Slayers,^{[ch. 176]} which is later revealed to be a cover for a discreet evacuation effort after Chagot foresees Extalia's eventual destruction caused by Edolas's loss of magic.^{[ch. 198]} The entire Exceed race is transported to Earth-land after Mystogan reverses Edolas's anima and, realizing their mistake in judging humans, decide to live in harmony with them whilst searching for the missing Exceed children.^{[ch. 197-198]}

=== Others ===
==== Igneel ====
Voiced by: Hidekatsu Shibata (Japanese); Bob Magruder (2011–2014), Jim White (2015–present) (English)

Igneel (イグニール, Igunīru), the Fire Dragon King (炎竜王, Enryūō), is a dragon and Natsu Dragneel's adoptive father. He raises Natsu from infancy, teaching him language, culture, and the ability to use Fire Dragon Slayer Magic.^{[ch. 2]} When Natsu witnesses Igneel's disappearance on July 7, X777, he begins a search for the dragon.^{[ch. 1, 66]} His search results in him encountering several other Dragon Slayers who have similarly lost their own dragon guardians on the same date. Fourteen years later, when Acnologia arrives at the battle between Fairy Tail and Tartaros, Igneel is revealed to have magically sealed himself inside Natsu's body all along,^{[ch. 400]} as are the other dragons with their respective children, for the triple purpose of preventing them from turning into dragons as a side effect of their Dragon Slayer Magic, waiting to personally eliminate Acnologia after the Dragon Slayers are fully inoculated,^{[ch. 414]} and prolonging their own lives since they have lost their souls to Acnologia.^{[ch. 415]} However, Igneel is brutally killed by Acnologia and ascends back to a higher plane of existence with his fellow dragons to watch over mankind. He also passes down the "Fire Dragon King Mode" to Natsu Dragneel after his death.^{[ch. 414, 415]}

==== Ur ====
Voiced by: Miyuki Sawashiro (Japanese); Kira Vincent-Davis (English)

Ur (ウル, Uru) is Ultear Milkovich's mother and Gray Fullbuster and Lyon Vastia's teacher. She is a renowned Ice Make wizard whose power is said to be worthy of the Ten Wizard Saints'.^{[ch. 46]} Before meeting Gray and Lyon, Ur brings her sickly daughter as a child to a magic research facility to save her life, only to later be told that Ultear has died while the doctors perform unethical, secret experiments on her.^{[ch. 241]} She then takes on Lyon and Gray as her pupils in an effort to move on. When Gray attempts to kill the Etherious Deliora, Ur sacrifices herself to save him by performing the forbidden spell Iced Shell (絶対氷結(アイスドシェル), Aisudo Sheru; Japanese text translates as "Absolute Freeze"), transforming her body into ice to permanently freeze the demon. She remains alive in this form until Lyon melts her with the Moon Drip spell to release Deliora, essentially killing her as she drifts out to sea as water. Later, Ultear falls into the sea while dueling with Gray, causing her to experience her mother's memories. She realizes the truth of what transpired at the research facility, and that her assumption that Ur had abandoned her there is wrong.^{[ch. 241]}

==== Jude Heartfilia ====
Voiced by: Banjō Ginga (Japanese); Bill Jenkins (English)

A wealthy business tycoon and president of the esteemed Heartfilia Konzern, Jude Heartfilia (ジュード・ハートフィリア, Jūdo Hātofiria) is Lucy Heartfilia's father. Like Lucy, his name is based on a Beatles song - in this case "Hey Jude". After Layla's death, Jude's relationship with Lucy becomes fractured, which eventually leads to Lucy running away from home.^{[ch. 50]} Years later, he recruits Phantom Lord to bring her home for a business opportunity. However, his actions inadvertently involve Fairy Tail in a guild war to protect her, resulting in Lucy breaking ties with her father.^{[ch. 67]} Shortly afterward, Jude becomes bankrupt and loses his estate, and takes up work at a merchant's guild, mending his relationship with Lucy.^{[ch. 130]} He dies toward the end of Lucy's seven-year disappearance, but demonstrates his love and faith in his daughter's well-being by leaving her seven years worth of rent money and birthday gifts.^{[ch. 258]}

==== Anna Heartfilia ====
Voiced by: Aya Endō (Japanese); Cherami Leigh (English)

Lucy and Layla's ancestor from 400 years in the past.

==== Elefseria ====
Voiced by: Mugihito

Elefseria (エレフセリア, Erefuseria) is the master of Magia Dragon (魔陣の竜(マギア・ドラゴン), Magia Doragon) Earth-land's first wizard guild, who appears in Fairy Tail: 100 Years Quest. He serves as Fairy Tail's client for the 100 Years Quest, which he issued following a failed attempt at defeating the Five Dragon Gods by teaching himself Dragon Slayer magic, resulting in his transformation into a dragon. As such, he has remained alive for the 160 years since making his request, using magic to assume his original human appearance. As the "Dragon of Law" (法竜, Hōryū), he possesses knowledge of all things in the world.

==== Karameel ====
Voiced by: Yōko Hikasa (Japanese); Molly Searcy (English)

Karameel (カラミール, Karamīru) is a resident of Ermina who was saved from a shipwreck by Mercphobia when she was young, serving as the latter's assistant. She has a close relationship with the Water Dragon God, and as such, is wary of any visitors out of concern for if they pose a threat to her master. In searching for a way to allow Mercphobia to live as a normal human, she made contact with the White Wizard.

==== Athena ====
Athena (アテナ, Atena) is a mechanical wizard created by Duke as a weapon against the Five Dragon Gods, becoming known as the Negative Legacy (負の遺産, Fu no Isan) of the Magic World for the destruction she caused. She is known in Ishgal as the White Wizard (白魔導士, Shiro Madōshi; also "White Mage"), the founder and figurehead of the white magic cult Rebellious, (Note: 白魔術教団(リベリアス), Riberiasu) for which she is thought to be as dangerous as Zeref, the Black Wizard.^{Ch. 9} Founding Rebellious was an unintentional impact of her travels to try to gain emotions and live as a human, a goal which also caused her to temporarily join Gold Owl when the fake Duke promised to help her achieve it in order to use her power for his own goals. ^{Ch. 137, 138}

==== Zalam and Iruha ====
Zalam (ザラーム, Zarāmu) is the Guild Master of the Alchemy Guild Lead Eagle (鉛の鷲リードイーグル, Rīdo Īguru).^{Ch. 142} His supposed father is a genius Alchemist named Iruha (イルハ, Iruha). The two can fuse into a young girl named Iruzala which boosts their Alchemy powers.^{Ch. 147} However, it is later revealed that Zalam is the real Duke Barbaroa, somehow surviving his apparent death, and Iruha disappears, making it unclear what he was.^{Ch. 149}

== Reception ==
The characters of Fairy Tail have received both praise and criticism from publications dedicated to anime, manga, and other media.

Carl Kimlinger of Anime News Network describes the characters' styles as having a "strong 'bite me' vibe" and compared the visual style to that of One Piece author Eiichiro Oda. In his review of the second volume, Kimlinger said that Cancer's fighting style "is a kick".

In reviewing the first DVD/Blu-ray volume of Fairy Tail, Carlo Santos of Anime News Network says "with a lead character as pumped-up as Natsu, it's hard not to get caught up in his energy". Santos also praises Happy, citing his character as an "entertaining diversion, proving that animal sidekicks can be fun to listen to and not just a necessary annoyance".

In his reviews of the Blu-ray/DVDs, Neil Lumbard of DVD Talk mentions the "strong likeability factor of each of the main characters".

Anime News Network writer Rebecca Silverman, in her review of the 20th volume, said, "Mashima still manages to get some action and laughs in as well, including one especially funny subplot involving Gajeel. Wendy takes over from Lucy as the primary female of the series for most of this volume, and how you feel about that will probably depend upon which character you prefer." Silverman also thought that readers "may have had mixed feelings about Jellal's return earlier in this arc, but the bond between him and Erza has been underlying their scenes for most of their page time together [in chapters 162 through 164]." However, she said that "for the romantics in the audience, Jellal is still a criminal, and the government wants him. And so they come for him," and pointed out that "Erza fans and detractors will find it deepens her character a little while still finding it sad."
