= Xeros =

Xeros may refer to:

- Xeros, Cyprus, a village
- Xeros family, Byzantine family
- Xeros washing machine, by Xeros Ltd.
- Subdesert toad, Amietophrynus xeros

== See also ==
- Xero (disambiguation)
- Zero (disambiguation)
- Xerox, an American corporation
