= Zero (disambiguation) =

Zero is a number.

Zero, Zeros, or Zeroes may also refer to:

== Arts, entertainment and media ==
=== Comics ===
- Zero (Marvel Comics), several characters in the Marvel Comics Universe
- Zero (manhwa), a Korean manhwa by Dall-Young Lim and Park Sung-woo
- Kenshiro "Zero" Cochrane, a character in Ghost Rider 2099
- Zero, a 2015 Image Comics publication
- Zero, a character in Beetle Bailey

=== Film and television ===
==== Films ====
- Zero (1928 film), a British silent drama film
- Zero (2009 film), a Polish action film
- Zero (2010 film), a stop-motion animation film
- Super (2010 Indian film), starring Upendra, officially known as 👌 (sometimes interpreted as Zero)
- Zero (2016 film), an Indian fantasy horror film
- Zero (2018 film), an Indian comedy film
- Zero (2024 film), an American action comedy film
- Zero (2021 TV series), an Italian TV series
- Zero (Singaporean TV series), a 2004 drama

==== Episodes ====
- "Zero", of Aika R-16: Virgin Mission (2009)
- "Zero", of Code Geass season 1 (2007)
- "Zero", of Crime and Justice Lagos (2022)
- "Zero", in the List of Emergency! episodes (1973)
- "Zero", of Fairy Tail season 2 (2011)
- "Zero", of HaShminiya season 4 (2013)
- "Zero", of Law & Order season 19 (2009)
- "Zero", in the List of Moving On episodes (2016)
- "Zero", of Numberblocks (2018)
- "Zero", in the List of Record of Ragnarok episodes (2023)
- "Zero", of Smallville season 1 (2002)
- "Zero", of The Net (1999)

==== Characters ====
- Zero (Hit the Floor character), from the TV series Hit the Floor
- Ultraman Zero, a character in Ultra Series
- Zero, a character in the miniseries Grimoire of Zero and in the spin-off The Dawn of the Witch
- Zero, a supporting character from the 2020 anime Yashahime: Princess Half-Demon
- Zero, a character from the 2021 animated series Tear Along the Dotted Line
- Zero, a character from the film John Wick: Chapter 3 – Parabellum
- Zero, a character in Star Trek: Prodigy
- Zero (Hector Zeroni), a character in the novel Holes

=== Games ===
- Zero (Drakengard), a character in the role-playing game Drakengard 3
- Zero (Mega Man), a character in Capcom's Mega Man video game franchise
- Major Zero, a character in the Metal Gear video game franchise
- ZeRo, the gamertag of Gonzalo Barrios, a former professional Super Smash Bros. player
- Zer0, the gamertag of Rhys Perry, a former Apex Legends player
- Zer0, a fictional character in Borderlands 2
- Zero, a recurring role in the Zero Escape series
- Zero (game engine), created by Pandemic Studios

=== Magazines ===
- Zero (video game magazine), a UK monthly magazine from 1989 to 1992
- Zero Magazine, a music magazine in San Francisco, US
- Zero (Spanish magazine), a Spanish gay-themed magazine

=== Music ===
==== Bands ====
- Zero (American band), a psychedelic rock band
- Zero (Brazilian band), a 1980s rock band
- Zero (Indian band), a rock band
- Zero Band, a Chinese rock band formed in 1998
- The Zeros (American band), a California punk rock band
- The Zeros (English band), a British punk band

==== Albums ====
- Zero (Dead End album), 1989
- Zero (Hawthorne Heights album), 2013
- Zero (KYPCK album), 2016
- Zeros (Declan McKenna album), 2020
- Zeros (The Soft Moon album), 2012
- Z.E.R.O, a 2012 mixtape by Kaaris
- Zer0, a 2020 album by Krewella

==== Songs ====
- "Zero" (Bump of Chicken song) (2011)
- "Zero" (Chris Brown song) (2015)
- "Zero" (B'z song) (1992)
- "Zero" (Fayray song) (2007)
- "Zero" (Hawk Nelson song) (2006)
- "Zero" (Imagine Dragons song) (2018)
- "Zero" (Mahmood song) (2021)
- "Zero" (NewJeans song) (2023)
- "Zero" (Alastair Riddell song) (1981)
- "Zero" (The Smashing Pumpkins song) (1996)
- "Zero" (Yeah Yeah Yeahs song) (2009)
- "Zero", a song from the 1992 album Souls at Zero by Neurosis
- "Zero", a song from the 2002 album Gaia by Janne Da Arc
- "Zero", a song from the 2004 album Occasus by The Amenta
- "Zero", a song from the 2010 album AB III (special edition) by Alter Bridge
- "Zero", a song from the 2014 EP Clear by Periphery
- "Zero", a song from the 2016 album Retrograde by Crown the Empire
- "Zero", a song from the 2024 album Ark by Crossfaith
- "Zeroes", a song from the 1987 album Never Let Me Down by David Bowie

=== Other arts, entertainment and media ===
- Zero (art), an international art movement; also the ZERO foundation, a German cultural institute supported by some Zero artists
- Zero, a character in the novel Holes
- Zero (Sapphire and Steel), an audio drama
- Zero: The Biography of a Dangerous Idea, a book by Charles Seife
- Zeroes (novel), a novel by Scott Westerfeld, Margo Lanagan, and Deborah Biancotti

== Cars ==
- Dome Zero, a 1978 concept car
- Fiat Zero, produced from 1912 to 1915
- Lancia Stratos Zero, first shown to the public at the Turin Motor Show in 1970
- Nikola Zero, a cancelled off-road side-by-side concept car

== Companies ==
- Zero Halliburton, a luggage company previously known as the Zero Corporation
- Zero Motorcycles, an electric motorcycle company
- Zero (corporation), a manufacturer of synthetic fuels
- Zero Skateboards, a company started by Jamie Thomas

== Computing ==
- AlphaGo Zero, edition of the Go software AlphaGo developed by DeepMind
- /dev/zero a special file in Unix-like operating systems that outputs null characters
- Zero client, a variant of the thin client computer type

== Mathematics ==
- Zero of a function, an element of the domain of a function, where the value of the function is zero
  - Zero (complex analysis), a zero of a holomorphic function
- Zero element, generalization of the number zero in algebraic structures
- Zero object (algebra), generalization of the number zero in algebraic structures
- Zero object, in a category
- Zero dagger (0^{†}), a particular subset of the natural numbers
- Zero sharp (0^{#}), a theoretical number relating to the consistency of set theory

== Places ==
- Zero, Mississippi, an unincorporated community, US
- Zero, Montana, an unincorporated community, US
- Zero Township, Adams County, Nebraska, US

== Other uses ==
- Zero, common marketing name for diet drinks
- Mitsubishi A6M Zero, a Japanese fighter aircraft used in World War II
- Zero (name), a surname, given name, or pseudonym
- Zero (linguistics), an element unrealized in speech, as in a zero article
- Zero bar, a candy bar manufactured by the Hershey Company
- Zero Emission Resource Organisation, a Norwegian environmental organization
- Zero, the default center of aim after sighting in (zeroing) a gun in shooting sports

== See also ==
- Zeero, a Tru64 UNIX command/utility
- Ziro, a town in India
- Ziro Province, in Burkina Faso
- 0 (disambiguation)
- Xero (disambiguation)
- Zero order (disambiguation)
- Sunyata (disambiguation)
