= Sunyata (disambiguation) =

Śūnyatā is an element in Buddhist philosophy.

Sunyata may also refer to:

- Sunyata (Robert Rich album), a debut album by Robert Rich
- Sunyata (VAS album), a debut album by Vas
- Sunyata Dance, 2011 work for clarinet and symphony orchestra composed by He Xuntian
- Alfred Sorensen (1890 – 1984), also known as Sunyata, Danish mystic, horticulturalist and writer

== See also ==
- Shoonya, a 2006 Bollywood film co-written by Anurag Kashyap
- Sundiata (disambiguation)
- Zero (disambiguation)
