= Fairy Tail Zero =

Japanese manga series by Hiro Mashima

- Tankōbon volume cover
- Genre: Adventure, fantasy
- Manga
- Written by: Hiro Mashima
- Published by: Kodansha
- English publisher: US: Kodansha USA
- Magazine: Monthly Fairy Tail Magazine
- Original run: July 17, 2014 – July 17, 2015
- Volumes: 1
- Anime television series
- Directed by: Shinji Ishihira (Note: Part of the main Fairy Tail series' anime, specifically the 2nd season)
- Produced by: Yoshikazu Beniya; Tetsuya Endō; Noritoshi Satō
- Written by: Masashi Sogo
- Music by: Yasuharu Takanashi
- Studio: A-1 Pictures; Bridge
- Licensed by: Crunchyroll (Note: In North America through Crunchyroll (formerly known as Funimation) and in Australia through Madman Anime.): UK: Anime Limited
- Original network: TXN (TV Tokyo), AT-X
- English network: SEA: Animax Asia; US: Funimation Channel
- Original run: January 9, 2016 – March 12, 2016
- Episodes: 10 (Note: The last two episodes of the 2nd season are an adaptation of the last two chapters of the 49th volume of the original manga, rather than Fairy Tail Zero)

Fairy Tail Zero (stylized as FAIRY TAIL ZERØ) is a Japanese manga series written and illustrated by Hiro Mashima. It is a prequel to Mashima's Fairy Tail manga, depicting the events leading to the formation of the titular wizards' guild. The manga was serialized in Monthly Fairy Tail Magazine from July 2014 to July 2015, with the 13 chapters collected into a single graphic novel by Kodansha. The collected volume was released in North America by Kodansha USA. The second season of the Fairy Tail anime television series included an adaptation of Fairy Tail Zero, which aired January to March 2016.

== Plot ==
In X679, six-year-old orphan Mavis Vermillion lives on Sirius Island as a servant at the wizards' guild Red Lizard. A violent skirmish breaks out between Red Lizard and the rival Blue Skull guild, leaving Mavis the apparent sole survivor alongside Zera, the Red Lizard guild master's daughter, who becomes her friend. Seven years later, a trio of treasure hunters – Yuri Dreyar, Precht Gaebolg, and Warrod Sequen – come to the island in search of its sacred relic, the Sirius Orb. Yuri contends with Mavis over ownership of the orb until they realize the long-neglected treasure has already been taken by Blue Skull. Mavis forms a truce with the treasure hunters to recover the orb; at her insistence, the hunters begrudgingly allow Mavis to bring Zera.

The group journeys to the city of Magnolia, where Blue Skull has established a brutal regime. Mavis attempts to bluff the guild into returning the orb by using her illusory magic, but fails to deceive the guild's master, Geoffrey. Outmatched, the group retreats into a nearby forest where Mavis encounters Zeref, an infamous dark wizard. Unaware of his identity, Mavis expresses sympathy for Zeref upon realizing he is afflicted with a curse that kills all life around him against his will. Grateful for her company, Zeref agrees to teach the treasure hunters how to use magic so they can combat Blue Skull, becoming friends with Mavis in the process.

After Mavis and her friends successfully overthrow Blue Skull and capture Geoffrey, she discovers that the orb has become contaminated with evil magic. Yuri ignores her warnings and takes the orb for himself, becoming possessed by its magic and unwillingly fusing with Blue Skull's massive skeletal dragon, which rampages mindlessly through the city. Mavis exorcises the magic from Yuri by casting Law, a prototype spell learned from Zeref, which permanently halts Mavis's physical age as a side effect.

Guilt-ridden over Mavis's sacrifice, Yuri dedicates his life to protecting her. After Mavis accepts his friendship, he confesses that no one can see or hear Zera besides her, revealing Zera to be a sentient illusion that Mavis subconsciously created in place of the real Zera, who died during Blue Skull's raid on Sirius Island. Mavis accepts Zera as an illusion with her encouragement, causing Zera to disappear. To protect and reassure the people of Magnolia, Mavis and the treasure hunters organize the Fairy Tail guild in Zera's memory, with Mavis serving as guild master.

== Production ==
In an interview included in the Fairy Tail Zero graphic novel, Hiro Mashima said he first rejected the idea of him creating a manga for Monthly Fairy Tail Magazine because he was so busy with the weekly Fairy Tail series and supervising its anime adaptation. After taking on a short job designing characters for a video game and deciding to focus on manga again, he planned a spin-off with Fairy Tail character Mavis Vermillion as the protagonist. Mavis was originally conceived for Fairy Tail as an old, grandfatherly character, but after Mashima realized that "Mavis" was a female name, and that his editors expected her to be female, he re-envisioned her as a young girl to surprise readers. Her popularity resulted in her making further appearances within the main story, and also inspired him to focus Fairy Tail Zero on how the guild was founded.

The chapters for the monthly series were 20 pages each, as with the weekly series, and spanned one year across 13 issues. Mashima had planned the story to involve Mavis overcoming a hatred of guilds, but dropped the idea due to page limitations. He designed the character Zera specifically for the series as a bully who becomes a kind person later in life, likening her to the character Éponine in Les Misérables. He designed thick, black eyebrows for her to contrast with Mavis's short, thin eyebrows. He also tried to keep Zera's identity a secret, although his editors already figured it out after reading the first chapter, and were surprised when she reappeared in the next one; however, he was able to fool Mavis's Japanese voice actor, Mamiko Noto.

== Media ==
=== Manga ===
Hiro Mashima began writing and illustrating the series in the first issue of Kodansha's Monthly Fairy Tail Magazine on July 17, 2014. The series ended in the magazine's 13th and final issue on July 17, 2015. The author stated that although the series was intended to be exclusive to the magazine, they received a lot of requests for a graphic novel version. The single collected volume was released on November 17, 2015.

The series is licensed in North America by Kodansha USA, who announced their license at an event at Books Kinokuniya in New York on November 15, 2015. They published the collected volume on July 12, 2016.

No.	Original release date	Original ISBN	English release date	English ISBN
1	November 17, 2015	978-4-06-395540-8	July 12, 2016	978-1-63236-284-1
1. "The Fairies in My Heart" (心の中の妖精, Kokoro no Naka Yōsei); 2. "The Truth Game" (真実のゲーム, Shinjitsu no Gēmu); 3. "The Night They Set Out" (旅立ちの夜, Tabitachi no Yoru); 4. "Dancing with Blades" (刃と踊る, Yaiba to Odoru); 5. "Moonlit Lake" (月明かりの湖, Tsukiakari no Mizuumi); 6. "Blue Skull" (青い髑髏(ブルースカル), Burū Sukaru); 7. "Black Wizard Mavis" (黒魔導士 メイビス, Kuro Madōshi Meibisu); 8. "Is Magnolia Burning Down?" (マグノリアは燃えているか, Magunoria wa Moeteiru ka); 9. "Treasure" (宝物, Takaramono); 10. "Law" (ロウ, Rō); 11. "That Which Vanishes" (消えゆくもの, Kieyuku Mono); 12. "Zera" (ゼーラ, Zēra); 13. "Eternal Adventures" (永遠の冒険, Eien no Bōken)

=== Anime ===
An adaptation of Fairy Tail Zero was announced for the Fairy Tail anime television series on the jacket bands of Fairy Tail volume 52 and on the single collected volume of the series. The adaptation premiered on January 9, 2016. Funimation simulcasted the series as part of the anime's second season with a broadcast dub in North America.

== Reception ==
The tankōbon of Fairy Tail Zero ranked 11th in sales by the end of its first week of release, selling approximately 104,878 copies. The volume ranked 21st on its second week, and 40th on the third week. The New York Times listed the North American release as the 10th best selling manga at the end of its first week, and 8th on the second week.
