= Xero (disambiguation) =

Xero is a New Zealand financial software company.

Xero may also refer to:

- Xero (band), an Australian punk band
- Xero (film), an experimental 2010 German film
- Xero (Linkin Park), an early name for the band Linkin Park, as well as a demo tape of the same name
- Xero (fanzine), American fanzine published from 1960 to 1963
- Xero (comics), comic book series and superhero created by Christopher Priest and ChrisCross
- Xero Shoes, a brand of minimalist footwear

== See also ==
- Xeros (disambiguation)
- Zero (disambiguation)
