= Xeros washing machine =

The Xeros Washing Machine is a clothes washing technology that cleans laundry using primary nylon polymer beads and very little water. The machine releases nylon polymer beads into a main compartment where laundry is washed. These beads are small and super absorbent which allows them to go through clothing to absorb dirt and stains. This technology is invented by University of Leeds professor Stephen Burkinshaw, who currently has partnership with Xeros Ltd. in perfecting this technology.

== Technology ==
The Washing Machine cleans using nylon polymer beads and one-tenth of the water used by traditional washing machine. Instead of cleaning clothes with water, the machine uses reusable nylon for its cleaning process. Nylon polymer beads are more absorbent than water, which allows them to absorb stains right into their core.

The Washing Machine creates a humid condition in the clothes compartment. This process causes the polymer chains in the nylon to separate slightly, making the beads absorbent. The beads then absorb and lock the stains in their core.

== Process ==
First, laundry is inserted into the compartment of the machine. The machine then releases nylon polymer beads and water containing detergent onto the garments. The washing cycle begins and the beads begin to absorb stains. After the cycle ends, the nylon polymer beads are then separated by a drum in drum separation process that is projected to remove 99.95% of the beads; any remaining beads can either be shaken off or removed with the use of a vacuum wand (included with the purchase of the machine).

== Inventor/Developer ==
The washing machine’s system is based on Professor Stephen Burkinshaw’s research. Burkinshaw spent his time at the University of Leeds focusing on the structure of nylon polymer beads. He discovered that nylon is the best material for absorbing tiny particles, and together with his team of researchers came up with the concept of using nylon beads to remove stains from clothes.

Professor Stephen Burkinshaw and his team of researchers partnered with Xeros Ltd. to commercially produce the waterless washing machines.

== Environmental and Energy Costs ==
According to Xeros Ltd., its technology uses 90% less water than the conventional washing machine. While a front-loading washer uses about 20–25 gallons of water, the Xeros Washing Machine is estimated to use as little as one gallon of water.

The machine was projected to save consumers up to 30% for operating costs in electricity and water.

== Ranking ==
The Xeros Washing Machine was ranked one of The 50 Best Inventions of 2010 by www.time.com.
