= Zero (name) =

Zero or Zéro is the surname, given name or pseudonym of:

== People ==
- Zero Mostel, stage name of American actor Samuel Joel Mostel (1915–1977)
- Gonzalo Barrios (gamer) (born 1995), professional Super Smash Bros. for Wii U player known by his alias ZeRo
- Karl Zéro, stage name of French filmmaker Marc Tellenne (born 1961)
- Renato Zero, stage name of Italian singer/songwriter Renato Fiacchini (born 1950)
- Zero, stage name of Japanese bass player of the former band D'espairsRay
- Zero (wrestler) or Lady Zero, briefly a ring name of Japanese professional wrestler Chigusa Nagayo (born 1964)
- Zer0, Australian professional Apex Legends player

== Fictional characters ==
- Mr. Zero or Mr. Freeze, a DC comic book supervillain
- Zero (Battle Arena Toshinden), in the Battle Arena Toshinden universe
- Zero (Beetle Bailey), in the Beetle Bailey universe
- Zero (Code Geass) or Lelouch Lamperouge, the main character in the Code Geass universe
- Zero (Digimon) or Zeromaru, in Digimon media
- Zero (Dragon Ball) or Son Goku, the main character in Dragon Ball media
- Zero (Drakengard), in Drakengard 3
- Zero (Grand Theft Auto), in the Grand Theft Auto universe
- Zero (Hit the Floor character), character from the basketball soap opera Hit the Floor
- Zero (Holes) or Hector Zeroni, in the Holes universe
- Zero (The King of Fighters), in The King of Fighters media
- Zero (Kirby), in Kirby media
- Zero (Marvel Comics), several characters in the Marvel Universe
- Zero (Mega Man), in Mega Man media
- Zero (The Nightmare Before Christmas), a ghost dog owned by Jack Skellington, the main character in The Nightmare Before Christmas media
- Zero (O-Parts Hunter), in the O-Parts Hunter universe
- ZERO (Sonic the Hedgehog) or E-100 Alpha, a robot in Sonic the Hedgehog media
- Zero (Tenchi Muyo!), in the Tenchi Muyo! universe
- Zero, an assassin in the 2012 2K / Gearbox game Borderlands 2
- Zero Kiryu, in Vampire Knight media
- Darryl Zero (Zero Effect), in the Zero Effect universe
- Kenshiro "Zero" Cochrane, a Marvel comic book superhero
- Zero (Cosmo Warrior Zero), in the Cosmo Warrior Zero universe
- Major Zero, in the Metal Gear Solid universe
- Sergeant Major Zero, in the Terrahawks universe
- Captain Zero, in the TUGS universe
- Zero, an assassin in the John Wick universe
- Zero, the main character in the Katana Zero universe
- Zero (Pokémon), in the Pokémon universe
- Zero Moustafa, in the 2014 film The Grand Budapest Hotel
- Agent Zero, a Marvel Comics character
- Miranda Zero, a major recurring character in the Global Frequency comic book series
- Ultraman Zero, an Ultra Warrior who is the son of Ultra Seven
- Numbuh 0, Monty Uno (father of Numbuh 1, Nigel Uno) when he was a member of the Kids Next Door

== See also ==
- Louise the Zero, a character in Zero no Tsukaima media
