= Fairy Tail season 2 =

Fairy Tail
- Season 2
- Promotional poster for the Tartaros Arc
- No. of episodes: 102

Release
- Original network: TV Tokyo
- Original release: April 5, 2014 – March 26, 2016

Season chronology
- ← Previous; Season 1 Next → Season 3

The second season of the Fairy Tail anime television series is directed by Shinji Ishihira and produced by A-1 Pictures and Bridge. Like the rest of the series, it follows the adventures of Natsu Dragneel and Lucy Heartfilia of the fictional guild Fairy Tail. The season contains three story arcs. The first 28 episodes continue the "Grand Magic Games" (大魔闘演武編, Dai Matō Enbu-hen) arc (episodes 202–203 filler), which adapts material from the beginning of the 36th to the middle of the 40th volume of the manga series Fairy Tail by Hiro Mashima. Focusing on Natsu and the others who have been frozen in time for seven years on Tenrou Island, the members continue to participate in the Grand Magic Games, an annual competition to decide the Kingdom of Fiore's strongest guild. However, they encounter a conspiracy involving a time machine called Eclipse and the imminent destruction of the kingdom. The next 22 episodes form an original storyline called "Eclipse Celestial Spirits" (日蝕星霊編, Nisshoku Seirei-hen) (episodes 219–226 filler), in which the twelve celestial spirits of the Zodiac rebel against their owners Lucy and Yukino after being transformed by Eclipse's black magic. The next 39 episodes contains the "Sun Valley" (サンバレー, Sanbarē) and the "Tartaros" (冥府の門(タルタロス)編, Tarutarosu-hen) arcs, which adapts material from the rest of the manga's 40th volume to the middle of the 49th volume, depicting Fairy Tail's battle with a dark guild of Zeref's demons who aim to resurrect E.N.D., their master and Zeref's ultimate creation. The following arc is a 10-episode adaptation of the spin-off manga series Fairy Tail Zero, also by Hiro Mashima. Fairy Tail Zero is a prequel which focuses on the adventures of the guild's first master, Mavis Vermillion. Finally, the remaining two episodes of the season are the beginning of the "Avatar" arc (アヴァタール編, Avatāru-hen), which adapts material from the last two chapters of the 49th volume of the original manga, and deal with Lucy Heartfilia reuniting with Natsu Dragneel and Happy one year later at the Grand Magic Games.

The season ran from April 5, 2014, to March 26, 2016, on TV Tokyo and its affiliates. The first DVD compilation was released with the first issue of Fairy Tail Monthly magazine on July 17, 2014, renumbered as "Vol. 1". The season was simulcast by its North American licensor Funimation Entertainment, subtitled in English on their website, and streamed English subtitled on Crunchyroll.

== Episodes ==
No. overall	No. in season	Title	Directed by	Written by	Animation directed by	Original release date
Grand Magic Games Arc (continued)
176	1	"King of the Dragons"; Transliteration: "Ryū no Ō" (Japanese: 竜の王)	Directed by : Kazunobu Fuseki; Storyboarded by : Shinji Ishihira	Masashi Sogo	Akihiko Sano & Hiroshi Imaoka	April 5, 2014
On the fourth night of the Grand Magic Games, Ziemma furiously tries expelling Sting Eucliffe and Rogue Cheney for losing to Natsu Dragneel. When Lector defends Sting, Ziemma seemingly kills him, only for Sting to blast the guild master through the chest. Meanwhile, Gajeel Redfox shows his guildmates the dragon graveyard he has discovered beneath the tournament arena. Using her Milky Way spell, Wendy Marvell summons the spirit of the dragon Zirconis, who tells the Fairy Tail wizards the history of dragons and Dragon Slayer magic—additionally revealing that Acnologia, the Dragon King, is a human Dragon Slayer who became a dragon after overusing his magic—before disappearing. The wizards then encounter Arcadios and Yukino Agria, who profess their plan to kill Zeref and Acnologia.
177	2	"The Eclipse Project"; Transliteration: "Ekuripusu Keikaku" (Japanese: エクリプス計画)	Directed by : Tokumoto Yoshinobu; Storyboarded by : Shinji Ishihira	Masashi Sogo	Yumiko Ishii, Miyuki Honda & Masato Hagiwara	April 12, 2014
Arcadios explains the details of the Eclipse Plan, revealing that the Grand Magic Games are designed to siphon the competitors' magic to power Eclipse, a gate that will allow them to travel 400 years into the past so they may kill Zeref in his mortal state; he further explains that the twelve zodiac celestial spirit keys owned by Lucy Heartfilia and Yukino are required to open the door. However, defense minister Darton opposes the plan for the radical changes it would have on the timeline, and he has Arcadios, Yukino, and Lucy imprisoned for their involvement. Darton offers to grant Lucy reprieve in exchange for Fairy Tail's victory in the Grand Magic Games, but the guild distrusts him. On the final day of the tournament, Makarov Dreyar has Juvia Lockser to take Natsu's place on their guild's team, allowing Natsu to join a second team with Wendy, Mirajane Strauss, Happy, Carla, and Panther Lily to rescue Lucy.
178	3	"Fairy Tactician"; Transliteration: "Yōsei Gunshi" (Japanese: 妖精軍師)	Directed by : Osamu Sekita; Storyboarded by : Shinji Ishihira	Shōji Yonemura	Masahiko Itoshima, Kenji Hattori, Yuji; Shibata, Eri Ishikawa & Isamu Fukushima	April 19, 2014
The guilds participate in a battle royal within the city for the games' final event. While the other teams eliminate Quatro Puppy's team and endanger Fairy Tail's lead, Fairy Tail's team remains motionless, to their guild's confusion. Mavis Vermillion reveals she is telepathically relaying a battle strategy to them, which she has formulated based on their opponents' behavior throughout the tournament, allowing her to predict their moves. After Fairy Tail eliminates Blue Pegasus under Mavis's direction, Gray Fullbuster faces Saber Tooth's Rufus Lore. Meanwhile, Natsu's team infiltrates the palace and rescues the celestial wizards, but Hisui E. Fiore, the kingdom's princess, drops the wizards down into the palace dungeon, the Palace of Hades.
179	4	"Gray vs. Rufus"; Transliteration: "Gurei bāsasu Rūfasu" (Japanese: グレイ vs. ルーファス)	Directed by : Kazunobu Shimizu; Storyboarded by : Shinji Ishihira	Atsuhiro Tomioka	Heo Gi Dong & Shoji Endo	April 26, 2014
Rufus overpowers Gray with his ability to memorize any form of magic and use it against him. Determined to win after suffering his earlier humiliation against Rufus, Gray overcomes Rufus's magic by conjuring different ice weapons faster than Rufus can memorize, lowering his guard long enough to defeat him. Meanwhile, Natsu's team tries escaping the dungeon by causing a ruckus to attract the guards' attention. They soon exhaust their ideas and press onward, unknowingly watched by a single-eyed flower.
180	5	"The Hungry Wolf Knights"; Transliteration: "Garō Kishidan" (Japanese: 餓狼騎士団)	Directed by : Akira Kato; Storyboarded by : Shinji Ishihira	Fumihiko Shimo	Akihiko Sano, Haruka Santo & Masahiko Inuzuka	May 3, 2014
Sting reflects on his resolve to win the tournament for Lector; in a flashback, Minerva Orland tells Sting that she has rescued Lector from Ziemma's attack, and is holding the Exceed hostage to motivate him. Back in the present, Natsu's team finds Arcadios seriously injured within the Palace of Hades. They are assaulted by the Hungry Wolf Knights, a five-man squadron of executioners loyal to the kingdom. Natsu and Wendy team up to battle the executioners Kamika, who uses paper magic, and Cosmos, who controls magic plants.
181	6	"Fairy Tail vs. Executioners"; Transliteration: "Fearī Teiru bāsasu Shokeinin" (Japanese: FT(フェアリーテイル) vs. 処刑人)	Directed by : Yoshitaka Fujimoto; Storyboarded by : Shinji Ishihira	Fumihiko Shimo	Shingo Fujisaki	May 10, 2014
Mirajane and Panther Lily join the fight against the Hungry Wolf Knights before a shockwave from one of Natsu's attacks separates both teams into five groups. While their friends engage each of the executioners in a one-on-one match, the defenseless Lucy and Yukino are left to face the executioner Uosuke, who uses his magic to transform the ground around them into a pool of lava. As the celestial wizards hang onto a sinking ledge, Arcadios wades through the lava to rescue them.
182	7	"Scorching Earth"; Transliteration: "Moeru Daichi" (Japanese: 燃える大地)	Directed by : Mitsuto Yamaji; Storyboarded by : Shinji Ishihira	Masashi Sogo	Yoshifumi Mori & Kazuko Tadano	May 17, 2014
Arcadios pushes Lucy and Yukino to safety on top of the ledge, telling them to escape and meet Hisui. He is then rescued from the lava by Lucy's spirit Horologium. Loke arrives with Lucy and Yukino's celestial spirit keys, allowing them to fight Uosuke, who alters the environment around them to counter the various spirits at their disposal. He eventually floods the tunnel with water, inadvertently allowing Lucy to summon Aquarius.
183	8	"Our Place"; Transliteration: "Ore-tachi no Iru Basho" (Japanese: オレたちのいる国(ばしょ))	Directed by : Tobita Tsuyoshi; Storyboarded by : Shinji Ishihira	Shōji Yonemura	Takashi Koizumi & Katsusuke Shimizu	May 24, 2014
Natsu, Lucy, Wendy, Mirajane, and Panther Lily each overcome their struggles against the Hungry Wolf Knights and defeat them. The force of their attacks sends the executioners crashing into each other, and the wizards quickly regroup as Natsu threatens the executioners to show them the dungeon's exit.
184	9	"The Kingdom 'til Tomorrow"; Transliteration: "Ashita Made no Kuni" (Japanese: 明日までの国)	Directed by : Fumio Ito; Storyboarded by : Shinji Ishihira	Atsuhiro Tomioka	Masahiko Itoshima, Masahiko Inuzuka & Haruka Saneto	May 31, 2014
Confronting Hisui for plotting Arcadios's rescue, Darton deduces that Arcadios has been covering for Hisui, who is the actual organizer of the Eclipse Plan. Hisui tells him about a new plan called Eclipse 2, which she has devised after being forewarned of the kingdom's destruction by a time traveling stranger from an apocalyptic future. She further explains that she has been told an "impossible" outcome of the Grand Magic Games by the stranger as a sign of trust. As this happens, Natsu and his friends encounter the hooded stranger at the dungeon's exit, where she reveals herself as Lucy from the future. Meanwhile, Erza enters a three-way battle between herself, Kagura Mikazuchi, and Minerva. Reaching a stalemate, Minerva shows them Millianna as her hostage.
185	10	"Erza vs. Kagura"; Transliteration: "Eruza bāsasu Kagura" (Japanese: エルザ vs. カグラ)	Directed by : Tokumoto Yoshinobu; Storyboarded by : Shinji Ishihira	Masashi Sogo	See note for the ADs (Note: Masato Hagiwara, Yumiko Ishii, Aki Yamauchi, Miki Takahashi, Yoshiko Takemoto & Mayumi Funakoshi)	June 7, 2014
Future Lucy collapses and is taken in by Natsu's team, while Princess Hisui and Jellal Fernandez ponder over the upcoming calamity. Meanwhile, as Gajeel and Laxus Dreyar square off against Rogue and Olga Nanagia, respectively, Minerva pits Erza and Kagura against each other before leaving with Millianna. Demonstrating her superiority over Erza with her sheathed sword, Kagura professes that she will only draw her weapon to kill Jellal. She reveals herself as the younger sister of Erza's friend Simon, and intends to exact revenge on Jellal for her brother's death. When Erza reveals that Simon sacrificed himself to save her and accepts responsibility for his death, Kagura furiously unsheathes her sword against her.
186	11	"A Future Racing Toward Despair"; Transliteration: "Zetsubō e Kasoku suru Mirai" (Japanese: 絶望へ加速する未来)	Directed by : Hiroshi Kimura; Storyboarded by : Kazunobu Fuseki	Fumihiko Shimo	Masahiko Matsuo & Natsuko Suzuki	June 14, 2014
During Kagura's attack, Erza rescues her from being injured by falling rubble. Kagura recognizes Erza as a girl from her past; a flashback shows Erza rescuing Kagura during a raid on their hometown, Rosemary Village, from the cult of Zeref worshipers responsible for enslaving her and Simon. In the present, Kagura cannot bring herself to kill Erza and prepares to surrender, but Minerva stabs her, bringing Saber Tooth to first place and enraging Erza. Meanwhile, Jura joins the fight between Laxus and Olga, while Gray and Juvia team up to fight Lyon Vastia and Sherria Blendy. In Mercurius, Future Lucy awakens and warns that after the Grand Magic Games, Fiore will be invaded and destroyed by a horde of 10,000 dragons.
187	12	"Frog"; Transliteration: "Kaeru" (Japanese: カエル)	Directed by : Kazunobu Shimizu; Storyboarded by : Shinji Ishihira	Atsuhiro Tomioka	Heo Gi Dong & Shoji Endo	June 21, 2014
After warning her friends, Future Lucy tells them that she used Eclipse to arrive in the present on the fourth day of the games, and she cannot stop the dragon attack. Arcadios notices a discrepancy between her statements and the counsel Hisui received on the Eclipse 2 Plan, which the princess describes as a weapon that fires the gate's accumulated magic energy on the dragons. The group continues to navigate the castle, but the kingdom's army boxes them in. Meanwhile, Rogue expresses his understanding of Gajeel's camaraderie in Fairy Tail and stops fighting. However, Rogue's shadow comes to life and possesses him, and tries killing Gajeel with his shadow magic. Gajeel infuses Rogue's shadow magic into his body, achieving his Iron-Shadow Dragon Mode.
188	13	"Roaring Thunder!"; Transliteration: "Gekirai!" (Japanese: 激雷!)	Directed by : Osamu Sekita; Storyboarded by : Shinji Ishihira	Shōji Yonemura	Masahiko Itoshima, Etsushi Okabe & Kenichi Takase	June 28, 2014
Gajeel single-handedly defeats the corrupted Rogue, which causes the shadow to release Rogue from its control and flee. In Mercurius, the Hungry Wolf Knights regroup with the army and battle Natsu and the others. Determining that Future Lucy cannot be lying about her traumatic experiences, Arcadios leaves the group to confront Hisui about the time traveler's statements. While Erza, Gray, and Juvia's battles continue, Jura takes out Olga with a single strike and attempts to do the same with Laxus. However, Laxus recovers quickly, and the two engage in a duel.
189	14	"Gloria"	Directed by : Yoshitaka Fujimoto; Storyboarded by : Masami Shimoda	Fumihiko Shimo	Shingo Fujisaki	July 5, 2014
Laxus defeats Jura after a heated battle, bringing Fairy Tail to first place. Gray and Juvia then defeat Lyon and Sherria, while Erza activates her Second Origin to don the invincible Nakagami Armor, allowing her to defeat Minerva as well. Sting, their last opponent, comes out of hiding and challenges Fairy Tail, intending to claim victory by taking out all five battle-weary wizards at once. However, seeing the five wizards' determination causes Sting to falter and forfeit to Fairy Tail, allowing them to win the Grand Magic Games. Millianna then reunites Sting with Lector, having found the Exceed during the games. When Hisui tells Darton that Sting's surrender is the outcome foretold to her, she initiates Eclipse 2, the Eclipse Cannon.
190	15	"The One Who Closes the Gate"; Transliteration: "Tobira o Shimeru Mono" (Japanese: 扉を閉めるもの)	Directed by : Fumio Ito; Storyboarded by : Shinji Ishihira	Atsuhiro Tomioka	Masahiko Inuzuka & Haruka Saneto	July 12, 2014
While celebrating their victory over Saber Tooth, Fairy Tail grows concerned for Natsu's team. In Mercurius, Arcadios confronts Hisui at Eclipse, where the princess reveals that her advisor from the future is not Lucy, but a man; the advisor reveals himself to be Rogue after using his shadow powers to wipe out the soldiers attacking Natsu's group. Future Rogue informs the group about the Eclipse Cannon, a weapon function of Eclipse that is capable of defeating the dragon horde, and that Lucy is responsible for closing Eclipse before the cannon could be fired in his timeline. He attempts to kill her with a magic blade, but Future Lucy jumps in the way and is killed instead. Grief-stricken by her sacrifice, Natsu engages Rogue in battle.
191	16	"Natsu vs. Rogue"; Transliteration: "Natsu bāsasu Rōgu" (Japanese: ナツ vs. ローグ)	Directed by : Daiki Fukuoka; Storyboarded by : Shinji Ishihira	Shōji Yonemura	Masanori Iizuka & Ryu Seizo	July 19, 2014
Lucy and her friends escape while Natsu battles with Rogue's future self. Rogue overpowers Natsu after activating his own White-Shadow Dragon Mode, but Ultear Milkovich and Merudy intervene and rescue Natsu before Rogue can kill him. After exiting the castle, Lucy and the others meet Hisui as the princess prepares to open Eclipse. Crocus is evacuated while Hisui's father, King Toma E. Fiore, requests that the wizards remain in the city to help fight any dragons that survive the Eclipse Cannon's attack. When Eclipse opens, Lucy suddenly says they must close the gate and moves to do so.
192	17	"For Me, Too"; Transliteration: "Atashi no Bun made" (Japanese: あたしの分まで)	Directed by : Akira Kato; Storyboarded by : Yasuhiro Tanabe	Masashi Sogo	Isamu Fukushima & Masahiko Itoshima	July 26, 2014
Lucy explains to Hisui that the Eclipse Cannon does not exist, having been telepathically informed of Eclipse's functions by her spirit Crux. To the horror of everyone present, dragons from the distant past suddenly begin to emerge from the gate, which has been sabotaged by Rogue's future self to remain open under the eclipsed moon. Lucy and Yukino summon the twelve zodiac spirits, who use their power to close Eclipse, leaving only seven dragons outside. Future Rogue takes command of the dragons and orders them to lay waste to Crocus; the wizard guilds fight the dragons, but are completely overpowered and unable to harm them with their magic. Recovering from his injuries, Natsu appears on the city rooftops to confront Rogue again.
193	18	"Seven Dragons"	Directed by : Mitsuto Yamaji; Storyboarded by : Jin Inai	Fumihiko Shimo	See note for the ADs (Note: Etsushi Mori, Mari Shirakawa, Toshiyoshi Sasaki, Yuri Yasuki, Takuro Sakurai & Minoru Okabe)	August 2, 2014
As the battle between the guilds' strongest wizards and the dragons continues, Sting and Rogue admit that they have no real experience in battling other dragons, as their dragon parents had actually requested to be killed by them. At Mercurius, Future Rogue tells Natsu of his intentions to use the seven dragons against Acnologia and become the new Dragon King. Realizing only Dragon Slayer magic can harm the dragons, Natsu calls out to the Dragon Slayers in the city to fight against them. At Jellal's request, Doranbalt releases the Oración Seis' Dragon Slayer Cobra from detainment to even out the numbers between dragons and Dragon Slayers.
194	19	"Zirconis' Magic"; Transliteration: "Jirukonisu no Mahō" (Japanese: ジルコニスの魔法)	Directed by : Yoshitaka Fujimoto; Storyboarded by : Shinji Ishihira	Atsuhiro Tomioka	Shingo Fujisaki	August 9, 2014
In Crocus, the dragon Motherglare lays multiple eggs that hatch into dragon-like offspring, which the other wizards fend off. As the Dragon Slayers fight each dragon, Wendy encounters Zirconis, whom she is reluctant to fight. However, after Zirconis mercilessly strips Lucy and the soldiers of their clothes in preparation of eating them, Wendy resolves to defeat him. Zirconis tosses Lucy away, sending her crashing into Natsu; when Lucy complains about the situation with Zirconis, Natsu gets an idea and immediately returns to the battle. Lucy discovers her future self's notebook among the rubble. Meanwhile, Jellal comes to Erza's aid in the city, but they are seen by a furious Millianna.
195	20	"People and People, Dragons and Dragons, People and Dragons"; Transliteration: "Hito to Hito, Ryū to Ryū, Hito to Ryū" (Japanese: 人と人､ 竜と竜､ 人と竜)	Directed by : Yuji Suzuki; Storyboarded by : Yasuhiro Tanabe	Shōji Yonemura	Masanori Iizuka, Masahiko Inuzuka & Haruka Saneto	August 16, 2014
Natsu jumps onto the back of the fire dragon Atlas Flame and begins eating the flames covering his body. While Atlas Flame attempts to shake him off, Natsu's technique reminds him of Igneel, whom Atlas Flame says is his friend. When Natsu reveals Igneel to be his adoptive father, Atlas Flame is freed from Future Rogue's control and assists Natsu in fighting him. Meanwhile, Rogue's present self is horrified to learn from the dragon Levia that his future self is responsible for the attack on Crocus. Ultear eavesdrops on them and decides to kill the present Rogue to undo his future self's plan.
196	21	"Sin and Sacrifice"; Transliteration: "Tsumi to Gisei" (Japanese: 罪と犠牲)	Directed by : Kazunobu Shimizu; Storyboarded by : Nobuhiro Kondo	Masashi Sogo	Heo Gi Dong, Shoji Endo & Mikio Shiiba	August 23, 2014
When Millianna confronts Erza and Jellal, Ultear intervenes and reveals herself to Millianna as the one responsible for Jellal's actions, including Simon's death; Millianna becomes uncertain about her desire for revenge, as does Kagura, who overhears. Ultear leaves to kill Rogue, who remains disheartened by his future self's actions until Sting arrives and reinvigorates him. Ultear loses her resolve and determines she no longer has the right to live for attempting to kill an innocent person. Meanwhile, the wizards continue to struggle against the miniature dragons. Gray rushes to shield Juvia from the dragons' blasts and is shot to death with lasers.
197	22	"Time of Life"; Transliteration: "Inochi no Jikan" (Japanese: 命の時間)	Directed by : Osamu Sekita; Storyboarded by : Tsukasa Sunaga	Fumihiko Shimo	Masahiko Itoshima, Minoru Okabe, Isamu Fukushima & Yuri Anki	August 30, 2014
As wizards across Crocus are cornered and killed by the dragons, Ultear recalls her forbidden Last Ages spell, which is capable of reversing time at the cost of the user's life. Ultear decides to atone for her lifelong misdeeds by using the spell to avert the dragons' arrival in the present. Although she discovers that only one minute has been reversed and collapses from exhaustion, the spell allows the wizards to foresee and avoid their own deaths, including Gray's. At Mercurius, Lucy reunites with her friends near Eclipse; using her future self's notebook, she reveals that they can return Future Rogue and the dragons to their respective time periods by destroying Eclipse.
198	23	"Fields of Gold"; Transliteration: "Ōgon no Sōgen" (Japanese: 黄金の草原)	Directed by : Tetsuya Endō; Storyboarded by : Masami Shimoda	Masashi Sogo	Shingo Fujisaki	September 6, 2014
Lucy and Yukino use their celestial spirits on Eclipse in a futile attempt to destroy it. In the sky, Natsu realizes that Frosch is dead in Future Rogue's timeline, which Rogue confirms is the cause of his own corruption. With Atlas Flame's help, Natsu rams Rogue and Motherglare into Eclipse, which destroys the gate. The dragons, Rogue, and Future Lucy's body disappear into their respective timelines as a result; Lucy awakens in a golden grassland and meets the spirits of her friends who were killed in her timeline. As he disappears, Rogue tells Natsu to protect Frosch in one year's time, shocking him with the mysterious name of Frosch's killer.
199	24	"The Grand Banquet"; Transliteration: "Dai Buyō Enbu" (Japanese: 大舞踊演舞)	Directed by : Hiroshi Kimura; Storyboarded by : Teika Sasaki	Shōji Yonemura	Natsuko Suzuki & Masahiko Matsuo	September 13, 2014
The wizard guilds celebrate their victory with a lavish ballroom party at Mercurius. While there, everyone is troubled when they realize Natsu's absence. Meanwhile, the Saber Tooth wizards reconcile with Yukino and offer to let her return to their guild. Fairy Tail and the other wizards begin to argue over letting Yukino join their respective guilds, resulting in a massive brawl. They calm down when Arcadios announces the king's appearance, only to discover Natsu impersonating the king as a practical joke. Later, Toma forgives Hisui for her role in the nearly causing Fiore's destruction after he punishes her to wear a pumpkin mask for one week.
200	25	"Droplets of Time"; Transliteration: "Seisō no Shizuku" (Japanese: 星霜の雫)	Directed by : Fumio Ito; Storyboarded by : Shinji Ishihira	Atsuhiro Tomioka	Etsushi Mori, Kenichi Watanabe & Eri Ishikawa	September 20, 2014
Jellal and Merudy search for Ultear, but the two are approached by Doranbalt, who reveals that he has wiped the Magic Council's memories of the dragon attack, as well as their encounter with Jellal at the tournament. He also reveals that Cobra has turned himself in, and forewarns them about the dark guild Tartaros. An aged Ultear gives a letter to Jellal and Merudy informing them about her sacrifice, but the two do not know that Ultear's magic has caused her to age rapidly. On his carriage ride back to Magnolia, Gray recognizes Ultear on the road and grieves for her, realizing that she is the one who rescued him. Feeling at peace with herself, Ultear privately bids her loved ones farewell.
201	26	"A Gift"; Transliteration: "Okurimono" (Japanese: 贈り物)	Directed by : Akira Kato; Storyboarded by : Teika Sasaki	Fumihiko Shimo	Masahiko Inuzuka, Haruka Saneto, Takuro Sakurai & Mari Shirakawa	September 27, 2014
After arriving in Magnolia, Fairy Tail is celebrated for their victory in the Grand Magic Games. As a gift, the city mayor unveils the guild's original guildhall, newly renovated. Afterwards, Natsu and his friends embark on a mission to save a village that has been flooded with mud by a "mole" (a giant mudskipper). Learning from the villagers that the monster is looking for a mate, the wizards trick Lucy into capturing it, after which Virgo finds a female "mole" (a giant crayfish) for the male to mate with. Later, Mavis finds Zeref at the forest near Magnolia, where he reveals that the conflict at the Grand Magic Games has inspired him to destroy mankind for their continuing conflicts; Mavis responds that Fairy Tail will destroy him instead.
Grand Magic Games Arc (Standalone side stories)
202	27	"Welcome Back, Frosch"; Transliteration: "Okaeri, Furosshu" (Japanese: おかえり､ フロッシュ)	Directed by : Suzuki Yuji; Storyboarded by : Shinji Ishihira	Shōji Yonemura	Masanori Iizuka & Hatsue Nakayama	October 4, 2014
Frosch wanders off while shopping with Lector in the city and becomes lost. Rogue desperately searches for Frosch alongside Sting, Lector, and Yukino, asking several wizards for Frosch's whereabouts. The group eventually finds Frosch trying to return to the Saber Tooth guildhall alone, and decide to follow in secret, averting various hazards to Frosch along the way. After spending the entire day searching, Frosch ends up at the Fairy Tail guildhall by mistake, to Rogue's dismay.
203	28	"Moulin Rouge"; Transliteration: "Mūran Rūju" (Japanese: ムーランルージュ)	Directed by : Teika Sasaki; Storyboarded by : Shinji Ishihira	Atsuhiro Tomioka	Shingo Fujisaki	October 11, 2014
After Fairy Tail gets a new pool table, Erza recalls the events surrounding her first experience with the game. In a flashback, Erza learns during the game that a bandit named Moulin Rouge has been posing as a member of Fairy Tail in order to commit crimes. Erza tracks down and subdues Moulin Rogue, who confesses that she is unable to find work to pay for medicine for her pet mouse, Sonny. After reprimanding Moulin Rouge for impersonating Fairy Tail, Erza offers her a job at the guild. Moulin Rouge reveals her real name, Bisca Moulin, and later joins Fairy Tail.
Eclipse Celestial Spirits Arc
204	29	"Full Effort Hospitality!"; Transliteration: "Omotenashi, Inochi Kaketemasu!" (Japanese: おもてなし､ 命かけてます!)	Directed by : Mitsuto Yamaji; Storyboarded by : Masami Shimoda	Masashi Sogo	Eri Ishikawa, Minoru Okabe, Takuro; Sakurai, Mari Shirakawa & Yuka Takemori	October 18, 2014
Lucy and Yukino offer favors to each of the twelve Zodiac spirits out of gratitude for their help in closing Eclipse. Each spirit's request gradually exhausts Lucy until she passes out from summoning all of her Zodiac spirits in a row after performing a comedy routine for an angered Aquarius.
205	30	"Signal of Rebellion"; Transliteration: "Hangyaku no Noroshi" (Japanese: 反逆の狼煙)	Directed by : Osamu Sekita; Storyboarded by : Shinji Ishihira	Fumihiko Shimo	Haruka Saneto, Etsushi Mori & Masahiko Inuzuka	October 25, 2014
A series of abnormal weather and natural disasters occurs across the world, keeping everyone in Fairy Tail busy. Natsu and Lucy embark on a job to investigate major changes in celestial bodies, but when they arrive at the supposed destination, they find that the job is a trap and are attacked by a giant sea slug. Lucy tries summoning her Zodiac spirits to fight, but they ignore her calls. Meanwhile, Yukino visits the Fairy Tail guildhall and reveals that she is unable to summon Libra and Pisces as well. The twelve Zodiac spirits appear before Lucy with their appearances and personalities drastically altered, and their memories of Lucy erased. Leo voids his and the other spirits' contracts with their owners, saying that they desire "complete freedom".
206	31	"Library Panic"; Transliteration: "Panikku obu Raiburarī" (Japanese: パニック・オブ・ライブラリー)	Directed by : Kazunobu Shimizu; Storyboarded by : Shinji Ishihira	Masashi Sogo	Heo Gi Dong, Shoji Endo & Mikio Shiiba	November 1, 2014
Lucy learns from her spirit Crux that the Zodiac spirits have laid waste to the celestial world, and that the Celestial Spirit King has disappeared. Researching a book brought by Yukino, Levy discovers that the spirits aim to perform a ritual called Liberam that will grant them complete freedom from their owners. Lucy, Yukino, and Levy visit the Magic Library in search of a globe required for the ritual, but are attacked by the corrupted Virgo. Meanwhile, Natsu enters the celestial world, convinced that fighting the spirits will return them to normal. He is forced out of the celestial world in battle against Taurus and crash lands into the library, allowing Virgo to escape with the globe while the others are distracted. Afterward, Levy reveals that the spirits will die twelve days after completing Liberam.
207	32	"Hisui Rises!"; Transliteration: "Hisui Tatsu!" (Japanese: ヒスイ立つ!)	Directed by : Daiki Fukuoka; Storyboarded by : Ryōji Fujiwara	Shōji Yonemura	Masahiko Itoshima, Joji Yanase & Kenichi Watanabe	November 8, 2014
The Fairy Tail wizards search for Astral Spiritus, the location where the Zodiac spirits intend to perform Liberam. They encounter Hisui and Arcadios, who reveal that the Zodiac spirits' change and weather phenomena are side effects of Eclipse's destruction. Feeling responsible for the situation, Hisui presents the wizards with a case containing magic keys that will allow them to forcibly close the spirits' gates. However, the case is stolen by the Eclipse form of Pisces, who appear as a mother shark and son kappa. After the group fails to recover the keys, Arcadios reveals the stolen case to be a decoy, and that he possesses the real keys.
208	33	"Astral Spiritus"; Transliteration: "Asutoraru Supiritasu" (Japanese: アストラル・スピリタス)	Directed by : Matsuo Asami; Storyboarded by : Masami Shimoda	Atsuhiro Tomioka	Satomi Miyazaki & Tomoaki Kado	November 15, 2014
Following Hisui's directions, Lucy and her friends reach Astral Spiritus and interrupt the Eclipse spirits' ritual. Lucy tries to reason with her spirits, but they refuse to relent despite knowing that their lives will be forfeit by performing Liberam. The rest of Fairy Tail arrives to fend off the spirits, who challenge the wizards to stop them. Armed with Hisui's gatekeys, the wizards each follow the spirits into a different pocket dimension, with Elfman battling and successfully sealing Taurus away.
209	34	"Wendy vs. Aquarius – Let's Have Fun in the Amusement Park!"; Transliteration: "Wendi bāsasu Akueriasu, Yūenchi de Asobo!" (Japanese: ウェンディ vs. アクエリアス､ 遊園地であそぼ!)	Directed by : Teika Sasaki; Storyboarded by : Ryōji Fujiwara	Masashi Sogo	Shingo Fujisaki	November 22, 2014
Wendy and Carla enter an amusement park dimension and attempt to gently subdue a young, lighthearted version of Aquarius, whose attempts to play with Wendy cause wanton destruction around the park. Midway through their battle, the two girls take a break and eat ice cream together, befriending each other before Aquarius resumes the fight. During his battle with Leo in another dimension, Natsu's is swallowed by a sudden wave of magic and falls into Aquarius's dimension, where he fights Aquarius on the park's Ferris wheel. Their attacks destroy the ride and cause Aquarius to fall, but Wendy saves her and convinces her to return to the spirit world.
210	35	"Guild Deck vs. Celestial Deck"; Transliteration: "Girudo Dekki bāsasu Seirei Dekki" (Japanese: ギルドデッキ vs. 星霊デッキ)	Directed by : Suzuki Yuji; Storyboarded by : Shinji Ishihira	Atsuhiro Tomioka	Takuro Sakurai, Yuka Takemori, Etsushi Mori & Mari Shirakawa	November 29, 2014
Capricorn challenges Levy to a trivia quiz, while Mirajane defeats Pisces in an underwater battle. Meanwhile, Cana faces off against Scorpio in a card battle game that pits simulacra of Cana's guildmates against the other Eclipse spirits. Cana struggles to grasp the rules of the game, but quickly discovers that both she and Scorpio make up the rules as they play eventually allowing her to play her strongest card, Gildarts.
211	36	"Gray vs. Cancer! Dance Battle!"; Transliteration: "Gurei bāsasu Kyansā, Dansu Batoru!" (Japanese: グレイ vs. キャンサー､ ダンスバトル!)	Directed by : Osamu Sekita; Storyboarded by : Yasuhiro Tanabe	Shōji Yonemura	Masahiko Inuzuka, Haruka Saneto & Minoru Okabe	December 6, 2014
Cana uses her Gildarts card to defeat Scorpio. Meanwhile, Cancer challenges Gray to a dance battle. When Gray admits he can't dance, Cancer gives him a pair of magic shoes and casts a spell on him that removes his inhibitions, turning Gray into a master dancer. This backfires when Gray infatuates Cancer with his dancing skills, allowing him to defeat the spirit while he is distracted. In Leo's dimension, Natsu, Wendy, Happy, and Carla enter a temple in search of Leo. After Natsu destroys a statue in the temple, a thirteenth gate appears in Astral Spiritus, which Hisui and Arcadios decide to investigate.
212	37	"Juvia vs. Aries! Desert Death Match!"; Transliteration: "Jubia bāsasu Ariesu, Sabaku no Shitō!" (Japanese: ジュビア vs. アリエス､ 砂漠の死闘!)	Directed by : Akira Kato; Storyboarded by : Ryōji Fujiwara	Fumihiko Shimo	Masahiko Itoshima, Isamu Fukushima & Kenichi Watanabe	December 13, 2014
Levy wins Capricorn's quiz in a tie-breaking match by revealing her romantic crush, while Natsu and the others encounter the thirteenth Eclipse spirit Ophiuchus in the form of a sadistic nurse. Meanwhile, Juvia searches for Aries in an arid desert realm. Aries attacks Juvia after her water magic is weakened by the heat, leaving her defenseless. However, Juvia senses a water coolant in Aries's magic four-wheeler and soaks herself in it, regaining her strength and defeating Aries.
213	38	"Erza vs. Sagittarius! Horseback Showdown!"; Transliteration: "Eruza bāsasu Sajitariusu, Bajō no Kessen!" (Japanese: エルザ vs. サジタリウス､ 馬上の決戦!)	Directed by : Kazunobu Shimizu; Storyboarded by : Takashi Ikehata	Fumihiko Shimo	Heo Gi Dong & Shoji Endo	December 20, 2014
Gajeel and Panther Lily are transformed into small animals by Gemini during their battle with the twin spirits, but Gajeel eventually discovers he can still use his magic and easily knocks them out. Meanwhile, Sagittarius challenges Erza to three horseriding contests: first an archery contest that Erza wins, and then a horse race won by Sagittarius. During their final match—a horseback battle on a minefield—Erza defeats Sagittarius by riding on his back and forcing him onto a cluster of mines. In Ophiuchus's dimension, Leo appears and reveals Ophiuchus's true form as a colossal serpent, and prepares to hold the Liberam ritual again.
214	39	"Natsu vs. Leo"; Transliteration: "Natsu bāsasu Reo" (Japanese: ナツ vs. レオ)	Directed by : Hiroshi Akiyama; Storyboarded by : Ryōji Fujiwara	Shōji Yonemura	Joji Yanase, Yuuki Morimoto & Yuji Shibata	December 27, 2014
Leo resumes Liberam with the constellations of the defeated Eclipse spirits overhead. Natsu battles Leo to interrupt him while Wendy, Happy, and Carla try in vain to retrieve the ritual globe. Leo weakens Natsu by absorbing his flames to strengthen his own dark magic, but Natsu eventually reverses the situation by consuming Leo's flames and using them against the spirit, defeating him. After Natsu returns Leo to the spirit world, the wizards discover Ophiuchus reciting a ritual chant in his place.
215	40	"Ophiuchus, the Snake Charmer"; Transliteration: "Hebitsukaiza no Ofiukusu" (Japanese: 蛇遣い座のオフィウクス)	Directed by : Teika Sasaki; Storyboarded by : Yasuhiro Tanabe	Atsuhiro Tomioka	Shingo Fujisaki	January 10, 2015
Hisui and Arcadios reach Ophiuchus's dimension and deduce that the snake spirit is acting on behalf of the Celestial Spirit King, who has also been corrupted by Eclipse. Meanwhile, Natsu falls ill as a result of harboring Leo's dark magic. He notices a weak spot on Ophiuchus's body and attacks it, causing the Eclipse spirits' realms to merge while Lucy and Yukino are battling Virgo and Libra, respectively. He holds the realm in place using the dark magic, allowing Lucy and Yukino to seal the two remaining Eclipse spirits away. However, Ophiuchus reveals this to be a part of her plan to sacrifice the Eclipse spirits to the Celestial Spirit King as part of a new ritual, Liberam Verus.
216	41	"When the Stars Fall"; Transliteration: "Hoshi Michite Nagaruru Toki" (Japanese: 星満ちて流るる時)	Directed by : Yuji Suzuki; Storyboarded by : Jin Inai	Masashi Sogo	Takuro Sakurai, Mari Shirakawa, Etsushi Mori & Kenichi Watanabe	January 17, 2015
Levy determines that they may stop Liberam Verus by destroying Ophiuchus, Astral Spiritus, and the celestial globe at the same time. The wizards inside Astral Spiritus begin demolishing everything around them while Natsu battles Ophiuchus and the others attack the globe outside. Ophiuchus plays her flute to turn Natsu's own attacks against him, but he overcomes her control and moves in to destroy her flute. Meanwhile, Hisui combines her powers with Lucy and Yukino to cast her ultimate celestial spell, Gottfried, in the hopes of destroying the globe.
217	42	"Celestial Spirit Beast"; Transliteration: "Seireijū" (Japanese: 星霊獣)	Directed by : Osamu Sekita; Storyboarded by : Shinji Ishihira	Masashi Sogo	Masahiko Inuzuka, Misa Okabe & Haruka Fuji	January 24, 2015
Although Natsu and the others defeat Ophiuchus and destroy the celestial globe, they are unable to prevent the Eclipse spirits from being absorbed by the Celestial Spirit King. Horologium appears and provides the wizards celestial clothing, allowing them to enter the celestial spirit world and confront the king, who appears as a giant, amorphous monster called the Celestial Spirit Beast. The beast uses its powers to transform the wizards into constellations, leaving only Natsu, Lucy, Happy, Gray, Erza, and Gajeel standing. Natsu senses that the Eclipse spirits are still alive inside the beast and enters its mouth with Happy to save them while the rest of his friends continue to fight the beast outside.
218	43	"Believe"	Directed by : Hiroshi Kimura; Storyboarded by : Shinji Ishihira	Masashi Sogo	Tomoaki Kado & Yoko Takanori	January 31, 2015
As Natsu searches for the Eclipse spirits inside the Celestial Spirit Beast, his friends outside manage to weaken the beast with their attacks. Natsu eventually finds the Celestial Spirit King's original form chained by the Eclipse spirits to a sphere of energy. By eating part of the sphere, Natsu is able to destroy it and free the spirit king. He returns to find their friends and the spirit world returned to normal, as well as the Zodiac spirits, who have lost their memories of their Eclipse selves. The wizards return to the human world while the Zodiac spirits renew their contracts with Lucy and Yukino.
Eclipse Celestial Spirits Arc (Standalone side stories)
219	44	"What a Pure Heart Weaves"; Transliteration: "Magokoro ga Tsumugu Mono" (Japanese: 真心が紡ぐもの)	Directed by : Hiroshi Akiyama; Storyboarded by : Ryōji Fujiwara	Shōji Yonemura	Yuki Morimoto, Hatsue Nakayama, Masahiko; Itoshima, Kenji Fukasawa & Yuka Takemori	February 7, 2015
Alzack and Bisca leave Natsu to babysit their daughter Asuka while they are away. Natsu loses to Asuka in a sharpshooting contest and is forced to fulfill her wishes for the day. Asuka takes Natsu, Lucy, and Happy to perform several odd jobs around town for her to afford a treasured snow globe lacrima that her parents were once forced to pawn off to pay for her medicine. Shortly after they buy the lacrima, it is stolen by a gang of sky pirates, but Natsu helps Asuka shoot them down by spitting fireballs along with her cork gun, revealing he had lost their contest on purpose. They return to the guildhall where Asuka gives her parents the lacrima after eating a cake that Erza, Wendy, Carla, and Lily have spent the day making for her.
220	45	"413 Days"	Directed by : Fumio Ito; Storyboarded by : Nobuhiro Kondo	Fumihiko Shimo	Hatsue Nakayama & Masanori Iizuka	February 14, 2015
Juvia decides to celebrate the 413th-day anniversary of her first meeting with Gray, and is encouraged by Erza to give him a present. After taking several suggestions from her friends, all of which end in failure, she settles on knitting him a scarf. However, Gray rejects the gift and asks to be left alone, despite Juvia's insistence. Lyon approaches Juvia and explains that Gray is mourning the anniversary of their teacher Ur's death. Feeling guilty for intruding on a such somber occasion for Gray, Juvia is comforted by Erza, who tells her that every day has a different meaning for everyone. Meanwhile, it begins to snow and Gray is reminded of Ur giving him a scarf, prompting him to recover Juvia's scarf. The next day, Juvia exchanges apologies with Gray and gives him a body pillow of herself as a 414th-day anniversary gift.
221	46	"The Labyrinth of White"; Transliteration: "Hakugin no Meikyū" (Japanese: 白銀の迷宮)	Directed by : Teika Sasaki; Storyboarded by : Masami Shimoda	Fumihiko Shimo	Shingo Fujisaki	February 21, 2015
Natsu, Lucy, and Happy set out on a mission to Mount Hakobe to collect magic ice with abnormal properties. They take refuge from a blizzard within a cave of living ice that closes behind them, trapping them inside. They quickly become lost for days in the labyrinthine cave with little food and sleep. They eventually find the magic ice at the cave's exit and retrieve a sample, only to be attacked by a giant octopus monster that they are too fatigued to fight. Lucy recalls that the ice has restorative properties and feeds it to Natsu, giving him the strength to defeat the monster. Exhausted, the group realizes that without the ice, they now have to start the mission over again.
222	47	"Transform!"; Transliteration: "Henshin!" (Japanese: 変身!)	Directed by : Kazunobu Shimizu; Storyboarded by : Shinji Ishihira	Shōji Yonemura	Heo Gi Dong, Shoji Endo & Mikio Shiiba	February 28, 2015
Mirajane teaches Natsu, Lucy, and Happy how to use transformation magic. Macao and Wakaba eavesdrop on the lesson so they can regain their youth and win over their estranged wives, but they strain their magic power after multiple failed attempts and transform into monsters that proceed to attack Magnolia. Meanwhile, Erza buys a superhero costume at a boutique and begins performing heroic deeds around town as "Fairy Woman". Upset that her heroics amount to little more than menial tasks, Erza encounters and defeats the rampaging Macao and Wakaba, returning them to normal. Afterward, she discovers that her face has inexplicably turned realistic while wearing her costume.
223	48	"It's Kemo-Kemo!"; Transliteration: "Kemokemo ga Kita!" (Japanese: ケモケモが来た!)	Directed by : Hiroshi Kimura; Storyboarded by : Norihiro Takamoto	Masashi Sogo	Kazuyuki Iizai & Tomoaki Kado	March 7, 2015
Natsu and Happy discover an egg that falls from the sky and hatches into a small, fire-breathing creature, which Natsu names Kemo-Kemo. Meanwhile, the Magic Council initiates a member exchange program between the guilds that participated in the Grand Magic Games; Natsu volunteers as one of the exchange members, interested in asking about Kemo-Kemo's origins across Fiore. As he and his friends visit the other guilds and cause problems for their respective members, they notice Kemo-Kemo growing larger and more powerful. When Fairy Tail visits Saber Tooth, the Council cancels the exchange program and requests the two guilds to investigate a mysterious island that has risen from the sea.
224	49	"The Place You Came To"; Transliteration: "Kimi no Kita Basho" (Japanese: 君の来た場所)	Directed by : Akira Kato; Storyboarded by : Nobuhiro Kondo	Masashi Sogo	Haruka Saneto, Minoru Okabe & Masahiko Inuzuka	March 14, 2015
While Fairy Tail and Saber Tooth explore the newly surfaced island, the two guilds are attacked by a giant sea serpent caught on the island. The serpent traps Natsu, Lucy, Happy, and Kemo-Kemo in the ruins on the island, while everyone else succumbs to a mysterious virus. Lucy deciphers the glyphs in the ruins and discovers Kemo-Kemo to be a guardian deity that protects those on the island from the virus. Kemo-Kemo grows into a giant and defeats the serpent alongside Natsu, curing everyone in the process. However, Kemo-Kemo merges with the island as it sinks into the ocean, leaving a seed behind that Natsu plants in front of his house in memory of Kemo-Kemo.
225	50	"Lightning Man"; Transliteration: "Ikazuchi no Otoko" (Japanese: いかづちの男)	Directed by : Yuji Suzuki; Storyboarded by : Yasuhiro Tanabe	Atsuhiro Tomioka	Etsushi Mori, Kenichi Watanabe & Yuji Shibata	March 21, 2015
Laxus and the Raijin Tribe accept a job requesting them to solve a series of never-ending lightning strikes around the city of Volwatt. The city mayor holds Laxus responsible for the phenomenon due to fighting a street gang prior to the Grand Magic Games. As Bickslow and Evergreen battle electric serpents in the city, Laxus and Fried find a lacrima charged with Laxus's lightning magic in the underground sewers. After Laxus neutralizes the lacrima, he and the Raijin Tribe discover that the mayor has deliberately set up Laxus to extort Fairy Tail. Laxus angrily confronts the mayor, but decides to spare him when he protects his granddaughter from the rampage. Laxus and the Raijin Tribe are hailed as the town heroes while the mayor secretly continues his extortion schemes.
226	51	"Fairy Tail of the Dead Meeeeeeeeen"	Directed by : Osamu Sekita; Storyboarded by : Shinji Ishihira	Atsuhiro Tomioka	See note for the ADs (Note: Masahiko Itoshima, Takuro Sakurai, Mari Shirakawa, Kazuzo Kobayashi, Hironori Hano & Hiroyuki Kamura)	March 28, 2015
Ichiya creates a handsomeness-enhancing magic perfume that spills into the sewers of Magnolia, where it transforms the townspeople and many of Fairy Tail's members into zombie-like Ichiya clones that spread its effects like a virus by sniffing others. Wearing a bunny costume that conceals her scent, Lucy evades detection from the clones and hides in the sewer together with Natsu and Happy, who accidentally destroy the costume and force the group to fly above the city, which quickly becomes overrun with Ichiya clones. Meanwhile, Romeo tells Wendy and Carla of the clones' weakness and sends her to meet Natsu before being infected as well. Natsu remembers a deodorant given to him by Erza and uses it to return everyone to normal. He and Happy then decide to take a bath at Lucy's house, not knowing that Happy has become infected.
Sun Valley Arc
227	52	"Morning of a New Adventure"; Transliteration: "Arata na Bōken no Asa" (Japanese: 新たな冒険の朝)	Directed by : Teika Sasaki; Storyboarded by : Shinji Ishihira	Masashi Sogo	Shingo Fujisaki	April 4, 2015
At their new bathhouse, the female members of Fairy Tail are approached by reformed Raven Tail wizard Flare Corona, who reveals that her guild has disbanded, leaving her with nowhere else to go; to the girls' bewilderment, however, she declines Lucy's invitation to join Fairy Tail. Later, Natsu and Gray receive a job request from Warrod Sequen, the fourth highest ranking Wizard Saint, asking them to save a frozen town known as Sun Village. Warrod explains that the village's Eternal Flame deity has also been frozen, and that the villagers are still alive inside the ice. He uses his magic to transport Natsu's team to the village on a moving tree, seeing them off as he remembers the formation of his original guild, Fairy Tail.
228	53	"Wizards vs. Hunters"; Transliteration: "Madōshi bāsasu Hantā" (Japanese: 魔導士 vs. ハンター)	Directed by : Yoshitaka Fujimoto; Storyboarded by : Takashi Ikehata	Shōji Yonemura	Watanabe Natsuki	April 11, 2015
Natsu's team arrive at the frozen Sun Village, discovering it to be the home of giants. While investigating the magic ice freezing the town, the wizards encounter a trio of treasure hunters from the Sylph Labyrinth guild, who plan to steal the Eternal Flame for themselves and warn Fairy Tail against interfering with them. The wizards chase after the treasure hunters for their bottle of liquified Moon Drip, believing the liquid can help save the village, but are shocked when the treasure hunters prove themselves to be capable fighters. Meanwhile, as Erza explores the village on her own in search of the Eternal Flame, she finds herself transformed into a child.
229	54	"Art of Regression"; Transliteration: "Taika no Hō" (Japanese: 退化ノ法)	Directed by : Hiroshi Akiyama; Storyboarded by : Yasuhiro Tanabe	Fumihiko Shimo	Hatsue Nakayama, Isamu Fukushima, Yuki Morimoto & Keita Watanabe	April 18, 2015
While struggling to adapt to her childlike body, Erza encounters Minerva, who reveals herself to have joined the dark guild Succubus Eye to take revenge against Erza for her humiliation at the Grand Magic Games. Meanwhile, the bottle of liquid Moon Drip accidentally breaks as the other Fairy Tail wizards fight Sylph Labyrinth over it, thawing out a small patch of ground. Natsu hears a familiar voice from the patch and sets off to find its source, only to run into Minerva's monstrous guildmate Doriate, who turns him into a child as well. Finding his physical and magical strength severely weakened, Natsu runs away. Elsewhere, Lucy and Wendy are separated from Gray and followed by Sylph Labyrinth. The girls are nearly killed by the treasure hunters until Flare arrives and rescues them, wearing a new emblem in place of her Raven Tail mark.
230	55	"The Demon Returns"; Transliteration: "Akuma Kaiki" (Japanese: 悪魔回帰)	Directed by : Fumio Ito; Storyboarded by : Ryōji Fujiwara	Fumihiko Shimo	Minoru Okabe, Kenichi Watanabe, Haruka Saneto & Masahiko Inuzuka	April 25, 2015
Flare reveals she is an adopted resident of Sun Village, evidenced by her new emblem. Angered by the village's frozen state and Sylph Labyrinth's callous effort to steal the Eternal Flame, Flare fights the treasure hunters alongside Lucy and Wendy. After the girls' attacks send the hunters flying out of the village, Lucy and Wendy accept Flare's offer to help guide them to the Eternal Flame. Later, Doriate finds Gray and turns him into a child, causing Gray to relive his traumatic memories of Deliora upon seeing the monstrous Doriate. While panicking, Gray hears Ultear's voice encouraging him and regains his composure, preparing himself to fight Doriate and save the village.
231	56	"Gray vs. Doriate"; Transliteration: "Gurei bāsasu Doriāte" (Japanese: グレイ vs. ドリアーテ)	Directed by : Kazunobu Shimizu & Umeko Tsujimura; Storyboarded by : Takashi Ikehata	Atsuhiro Tomioka	Shoji Endo, In Bum Hwang & Mikio Shiiba	May 2, 2015
Despite Gray's weakened magic in his childlike form, he outsmarts and humiliates Doriate with various pratfalls, determining that he is not the one responsible for freezing Sun Village. Enraged, Doriate transforms into a massive demon whose roar transforms everyone in the village into a child. Gray notices that the berserk Doriate instinctively avoids the ice freezing the village, which he deduces is harmful to the demon. Gray channels the ice's magic through his body to defeat Doriate, reversing his spell on everyone. Doriate is subsequently devoured by his and Minerva's giant, one-eyed bird mount. Meanwhile, Natsu meets with Lucy, Wendy, and Flare after tracing the voice to a frozen mountain, which Flare reveals to be the Eternal Flame. Gray arrives at the flame while pursued by the bird, which Natsu prepares to fight.
232	57	"Voice of the Flame"; Transliteration: "Honō no Koe" (Japanese: 炎の声)	Directed by : Yuji Suzuki; Storyboarded by : Akira Nishimori	Shōji Yonemura	Etsushi Mori, Yuji Shibata, Kenichi Watanabe & Yuka Takemori	May 9, 2015
Gray uses his newfound understanding of the magic ice to unfreeze the Eternal Flame. Upon doing so, the wizards find the flame burning faintly. Natsu uses his fire attacks to knock the one-eyed bird onto the flame's altar, reigniting the flame. Recognizing the flame as a dragon's spirit, Wendy uses her Milky Way spell and reveals the flame to be Atlas Flame, who recalls the village being frozen by a Demon Slayer wizard named Silver, one of the dark guild Tartaros's elite Nine Demon Gates. Atlas Flame uses the last of his strength to thaw out the rest of Sun Village, freeing the giants and forcing Minerva to flee. Before vanishing, Atlas Flame tells Natsu about E.N.D., Zeref's most powerful demon, and Igneel's inability to destroy it.
233	58	"Song of the Fairies"	Directed by : Yoshitaka Fujimoto; Storyboarded by : Shinji Ishihira	Masashi Sogo	Natsuki Watanabe & Shun Yamaoka	May 16, 2015
After Atlas Flame's disappearance, Fairy Tail celebrates their mission's success while Flare is welcomed back by the giants of Sun Village. Elsewhere, Minerva returns to the Succubus Eye guildhall to find her guildmates wiped out by Kyôka, one of the Nine Demon Gates. Kyôka notes that the rest of Succubus Eye have failed to withstand her power of strength enhancement, which she proceeds to use on Minerva to recruit her for Tartaros. Later, the Fairy Tail members make their way back to Warrod's house to collect their reward, which turns out to be a potato. After Warrod reveals his membership in Fairy Tail to the younger wizards, Natsu asks him about E.N.D., whom Warrod speculates is in Tartaros's possession.
Tartaros Arc (Prologue) (Note: Tarutarosu-hen (Joshō) (冥府の門(タルタロス)編【序章】))
234	59	"The Nine Demon Gates"; Transliteration: "Kyūkimon" (Japanese: 九鬼門)	Directed by : Hiroshi Akiyama; Storyboarded by : Shinji Ishihira	Masashi Sogo	Akihiko Sano, Yuuki Morimoto & Masahiko Itoshima	May 23, 2015
The Magic Council discusses Tartaros's recent activity and the decrease in dark guilds under its jurisdiction. When the council decides to take action, Jackal of the Nine Demon Gates uses his explosion-based powers to detonate the building, killing every councilor and several others, including Lahar. As news of the Magic Council's assassination spreads to Fairy Tail, Doranbalt, one of the attack's few survivors, goes to the council dungeon to extract information on Tartaros from Cobra. Cobra tells him that the dark guild is composed entirely of demons from the books of Zeref, with E.N.D. serving as their master. Later, Tempester, another of the Nine Demon Gates, hunts down retired councilor Yajima. The Raijin Tribe attempt to defend Yajima from Tempester's storm-based powers before Laxus arrives to battle the demon.
235	60	"Fairies vs. Netherworld"; Transliteration: "Yōsei bāsasu Meifu" (Japanese: 妖精 対 冥府)	Directed by : Teika Sasaki; Storyboarded by : Yasuhiro Tanabe	Atsuhiro Tomioka	Shingo Fujisaki	May 30, 2015
Laxus defeats Tempester before the demon can kill Yajima. Mortally injured, Tempester's body disintegrates to be reconfigured at Tartaros's headquarters, leaving behind a cloud of toxic Devil Particles. Laxus inhales most of the particles to keep his friends from being contaminated, but he is unable to save the town, which is quarantined. After Laxus and Raijin Tribe are brought to the guildhall to recover, Natsu furiously declares war on Tartaros to avenge their friends. The guild sends several teams to the surviving ex-council members' homes to protect them; Natsu's team meets Michello, who thinks that Tartaros is after something called "Face". Jackal detonates Michello's house, but Natsu consumes the explosion and faces the demon.
236	61	"The White Legacy"; Transliteration: "Shiroki Isan" (Japanese: 白き遺産)	Directed by : Akira Kato; Storyboarded by : Masami Shimoda	Fumihiko Shimo	Masahiko Inuzuka, Misa Okabe & Haruka Fuji	June 6, 2015
Natsu assails Jackal when the demon demolishes the city around them, but Jackal uses his curse power to turn Natsu into a living bomb, knocking him unconscious. Michello runs for his life, insisting he knows nothing of Tartaros's plans as Jackal chases him through the city. Lucy pursues Jackal as Wendy heals Natsu, but Jackal traps her in a land mine and threatens to kill Michello and a pregnant woman, forcing her to choose between whom to spare. Natsu recovers in time to save Lucy, having learned to eat Jackal's explosions without being damaged by them, and faces Jackal again.
237	62	"Natsu vs. Jackal"; Transliteration: "Natsu bāsasu Jakkaru" (Japanese: ナツ vs. ジャッカル)	Directed by : Kazunobu Shimizu & Umeko Tsujimura; Storyboarded by : Akira Nishimori	Shōji Yonemura	Shoji Endo, In Bum Hwang & Mikio Shiiba	June 13, 2015
Realizing his explosions no longer affect Natsu, Jackal assumes his demonic true form, but Natsu quickly defeats him. Jackal self-destructs in a final effort to kill the wizards, but Happy carries him above the city before he explodes, barely escaping the blast himself. Later, Fairy Tail's other teams find that their assigned council members have already been killed. Elfman and Lisanna encounter Seilah of the Nine Demon Gates, who takes control of Elfman's body to strangle Lisanna. Makarov interrogates Michello, who tells them that Face is a pulse bomb used by the Magic Council to eradicate all magic on the continent; this would leave humans defenseless against Tartaros, whose curse power would be unaffected. According to Michello, Face's seal is connected to the lives of three former council members whose identities are known only by the original chairman, whom Erza and Mirajane are dispatched to protect.
Tartaros Arc (Note: Tarutarosu-hen (冥府の門(タルタロス)編))
238	63	"Immorality and Sinners"; Transliteration: "Haitoku to Zainin" (Japanese: 背徳と罪人)	Directed by : Osamu Sekita; Storyboarded by : Shinji Ishihira	Masashi Sogo	Hatsue Nakayama, Takuro Sakurai, Mari; Shirakawa, Iseong Kim, Hyung Jun Heo	June 20, 2015
Erza and Mirajane arrive at the home of former council chairman Crawford Theme, who professes his ignorance of Face, before they are ambushed by henchmen from Tartaros. Meanwhile, Doranbalt releases the Oración Seis from prison under Jellal's watch. With Brain incapacitated by Cobra and Hoteye refusing to fight, the other four members battle Jellal. Later, Erza and Mirajane collapse and are captured by Crawford, who hands them over to Tartaros. Erza awakens in Tartaros's dungeon and is tortured by Kyôka, who demands to know Jellal's location, revealing that Jellal harbors the last remaining key to Face's seal. Natsu realizes Crawford is Tartaros's informant and traces his scent to Tartaros's headquarters to rescue his friends.
239	64	"Jellal vs. Oración Seis"; Transliteration: "Jerāru bāsasu Orashion Seisu" (Japanese: ジェラール vs. 六魔将軍(オラシオンセイス))	Directed by : Yuji Suzuki; Storyboarded by : Shinji Ishihira	Fumihiko Shimo	Etsushi Mori, Kenichi Watanabe & Yuji Shibata	June 27, 2015
Natsu attacks Franmalth, one of the Nine Demon Gates, until Silver arrives to deal with Natsu. When Natsu recognizes Silver's scent as similar to Gray's, Silver freezes him solid and imprisons him with Lisanna, leaving Happy to escape on his own. Meanwhile, Jellal continues to battle the Oración Seis, unaware as Zero's personality appears to take control of Brain. Happy later returns to Fairy Tail's guildhall to warn about what has happened, including the location of their base, a floating, cubical island. Elfman then returns, but unknown to anyone else, he is possessed by Seilah and has brought an explosive lacrima to destroy the guild.
240	65	"A Place Reached by Prayer"; Transliteration: "Inori ga Todoku Basho" (Japanese: 祈りが届く場所)	Directed by : Fumio Ito; Storyboarded by : Shinji Ishihira	Atsuhiro Tomioka	Masahiko Itoshima, Isamu Fukushima, Hatsue; Nakayama, Masanori Iizuka & Ken Itakura	July 4, 2015
As Crawford attempts to locate the final key to Face, Zero awakens and seemingly vaporizes Jellal. Realizing it is an illusion created by Midnight, Jellal maims his own eyes to break the illusion, and he defeats the Oración Seis. He then asks the defeated dark guild to join Crime Sorcière and aid in the battle against Zeref. Crawford transfers the final key to himself, but rather than allow him to transfer it to another sacrifice, Kyôka kills him immediately and unseals Face. Meanwhile, the Fairy Tail wizards discover that Tartaros's headquarters are directly above Magnolia. Before they can react, Elfman detonates Seilah's bomb, destroying their guildhall.
241	66	"The Demon's Rebirth"; Transliteration: "Akuma Tensei" (Japanese: 悪魔転生)	Directed by : Teika Sasaki; Storyboarded by : Masami Shimoda	Shōji Yonemura	Shingo Fujisaki	July 11, 2015
As the demons of Tartaros revel in Fairy Tail's destruction, they see Happy, Carla, and Lily flying towards Cube with Cana's magic card deck, which has their guildmates sealed safely inside. Cana unseals the guild and they begin their assault on Tartaros. Mirajane breaks free of Tartaros's demonic reincarnation facility, while Natsu and Lisanna escape their cell during the confusion and free Erza, who interrogates Kyôka over Tartaros's goals. The two fight, creating a hole in Tartaros's headquarters that allows the rest of Fairy Tail to enter. Natsu separates with Lisanna before time stops around him, and Zeref appears before him.
242	67	"To Let Live or Die"; Transliteration: "Ikasu ka Korosu ka" (Japanese: 生かすか殺すか)	Directed by : Hiroshi Akiyama; Storyboarded by : Akira Nishimori	Atsuhiro Tomioka	Masahiko Inuzuka, Misa Okabe & Haruka Fuji	July 18, 2015
Before disappearing, Zeref cryptically tells Natsu to choose whether to spare or kill E.N.D. As the rest of Fairy Tail invades Tartaros's base, Mirajane reunites with Lisanna and is confronted by Seilah, who wants to exact revenge for her failure to destroy the guild. Lucy, Wendy, Happy, and Carla reach Tartaros's control room to discover that Face has been set to detonate within 41 minutes. Chased by the Demon Gates Franmalth and Keyes, Lucy and Gray help hold the demons off to allow Wendy and Carla to find and deactivate Face. Natsu reunites with Lucy to battle Franmalth, who has the ability to absorb Lucy's spirits and mimic their powers. When Natsu overcomes his spirit forms, Franmalth assumes a powerful new form that shocks the wizards.
243	68	"Wendy vs. Ezel"; Transliteration: "Wendi bāsasu Ezeru" (Japanese: ウェンディ vs. エゼル)	Directed by : Akira Kato; Storyboarded by : Takashi Ikehata	Fumihiko Shimo	Mari Shirakawa, Takuro Sakurai, Ken; Itakura, Masanori Iizuka & Etsushi Mori	July 25, 2015
Franmalth takes on the comically distorted form of Hades, Grimoire Heart's master, using the dark wizard's formidable magic against Natsu and Lucy. Natsu finds that his magic has no effect on Franmalth, who is able to absorb his attacks. Meanwhile, Wendy and Carla reach Face, which is guarded by the multi-armed Ezel, one of the Nine Demon Gates. When Ezel brutally injures Wendy and prepares to eat Carla, Wendy consumes the Ether-nano in the air around Face, allowing her to activate Dragon Force.
244	69	"Friends Forever"; Transliteration: "Zutto Tomodachi de" (Japanese: ずっと友達で)	Directed by : Kazunobu Shimizu & Ayaka Tsujihashi; Storyboarded by : Shinji Ishihira	Shōji Yonemura	Shoji Endo, In Bum Hwang & Mikio Shiiba	August 1, 2015
Using her newly attained Dragon Force, Wendy simultaneously defeats Ezel in his powered up form and dismantles Face. To her dismay, the bomb continues its countdown and its imminent detonation is sensed by Fairy Tail and Tartaros. Using her clairvoyance, Carla reconfigures Face to self-destruct and tells Wendy to save herself from the explosion, but she declines and they activate the mechanism together. The bomb explodes, but Doranbalt saves the two and commends them for their heroism.
245	70	"Hell's Core"; Transliteration: "Heru'zu Koa" (Japanese: ヘルズ・コア)	Yoshitaka Fujimoto	Masashi Sogo	Watanabe Natsuki	August 8, 2015
Sensing that Face has been deactivated, Franmalth begins absorbing Natsu, Lucy, and Happy's souls in a fury. When Lucy attempts to de-summon her celestial spirits absorbed by Franmalth in order to save them, the demon is nearly sent to the celestial world with them and releases the spirits. Lucy tricks Franmalth into thinking Natsu is also one of her spirits, allowing Natsu to break free and defeat Franmalth by smashing him with giant rocks. Hades's soul is released form Franmalth, and he warns that detonating Face is not Tartaros's true objective. Meanwhile, Mirajane destroys Tartaros's laboratory in her fight with Seilah, preventing Ezel and Franmalth from being resurrected. Finding that her curse has no effect on Mirajane, Seilah unleashes her true power to overwhelm her.
246	71	"Underworld King"; Transliteration: "Mei-ō" (Japanese: 冥王)	Directed by : Yuji Suzuki; Storyboarded by : Shinji Ishihira	Masashi Sogo	Yi Sung Kim, Kenichi Watanabe & Yuji Shibata	August 15, 2015
Jellal, Merudy, and the Oración Seis encounter former Grimoire Heart member Rustyrose, who has survived a failed assault against Tartaros. Rustyrose warns that Mard Geer, the Underworld King who commands Tartaros on E.N.D.'s behalf, far surpasses the power of the Nine Demon Gates. Jellal and Merudy set out to face Tartaros, but the Oración Seis refuse to violate their non-aggression pact with the dark guild. Later, Rustyrose attacks Jellal and attempts to persuade Merudy to reform Grimoire Heart. Her refusal to obsess over the past inspires the Oración Seis to save her and Jellal, who regains his eyesight. Jellal leaves with his new allies after offering Rustyrose membership in Crime Sorcière.
247	72	"Alegria"; Transliteration: "Areguria" (Japanese: アレグリア)	Directed by : Yoshitaka Fujimoto; Storyboarded by : Akira Nishimori	Atsuhiro Tomioka	Shingo Fujisaki	August 22, 2015
Mirajane uses the last of her magic to absorb some of Seilah's abilities, which she uses to call Elfman to her rescue, defeating Seilah. As Warren telepathically contacts the rest of the guild, Happy relays Hades's message to Makarov, who determines he must activate Lumen Histoire. Mard Geer interrupts and casts the Alegria curse, which transforms the island cube into the flying monster Pluto's Grim. The wizards within its body are all absorbed into the creature's body except for Lucy, who miraculously escapes the curse.
248	73	"A Strike from the Stars"; Transliteration: "Hoshiboshi no Ichigeki" (Japanese: 星々の一撃)	Directed by : Osamu Sekita & Yuji Suzuki; Storyboarded by : Masami Shimoda	Shōji Yonemura	Masahiko Itoshima, Masanori Iizuka & Hatsue Nakayama	August 29, 2015
As Lucy looks for a way to release her friends from Pluto's Grim, she is pursued by the members of Tartaros, including the Demon Gates Torafuzar and a resurrected Jackal. Lucy exhausts herself summoning Leo, Virgo, and Aquarius to help fight off the demons. When Jackal corners Lucy, Aquarius advises her to summon the Celestial Spirit King, which requires her to destroy one of her golden Zodiac keys, thus making it impossible to summon that spirit again. Lucy reluctantly sacrifices Aquarius's key at the spirit's urging and summons the king, who cuts down Pluto's Grim and confronts Mard Geer.
249	74	"Celestial Spirit King vs. Underworld King"; Transliteration: "Seirei-ō bāsasu Mei-ō" (Japanese: 星霊王 vs. 冥王)	Directed by : Mitsuto Yamaji; Storyboarded by : Shinji Ishihira	Fumihiko Shimo	Masahiko Inuzuka, Misa Okabe & Haruka Fuji	September 5, 2015
The Celestial Spirit King attacks Mard Geer to avenge the sacrifice of Aquarius's key. During their battle, the king fits Lucy with clothes imbued with Aquarius's magic, giving her enough power to defeat Jackal. As Lucy's depletion of magic causes the king's strength to wane, he uses his remaining power to break Mard Geer's curse on Fairy Tail and encase the Underworld King in stone before returning to the spirit world. Torafuzar, Keyes, Silver, and Tempester arrive to kill Lucy, but Natsu, Gray, Gajeel, and Juvia come to her rescue.
250	75	"Erza vs. Minerva"; Transliteration: "Eruza bāsasu Mineruba" (Japanese: エルザ vs. ミネルバ)	Directed by : Akira Kato; Storyboarded by : Shinji Ishihira	Shōji Yonemura	Yuuki Morimoto, Eri Ishikawa & Yuka Takemori	September 12, 2015
Silver separates Gray from his friends as they fight against the remaining three demons, while Franmalth survives in the form of a mushroom attached to Happy's head. Elsewhere, Wendy and Carla awaken in Doranbalt's care to discover thousands of Face bombs have appeared in place of the one they have destroyed. Meanwhile, Erza battles with Minerva, who has been converted into a demon. During their fight, Minerva's memories of her father's abuse surface and she suffers an emotional breakdown, asking Erza to kill her. Mard Geer escapes his petrification and attempts to kill Minerva for her weakness, but she is rescued by Sting, Rogue, and their Exceed.
251	76	"The Boy's Tale"; Transliteration: "Shōnen no Monogatari" (Japanese: 少年の物語)	Directed by : Yoshitaka Fujimoto; Storyboarded by : Shinji Ishihira	Fumihiko Shimo	Shingo Fujisaki & Natsuki Watanabe	September 19, 2015
Sting and Rogue battle Mard Geer to cover for Erza and Minerva's escape. Erza and Minerva learn that Keyes is using Crawford's reanimated corpse to manually activate the Face bombs. They soon discover Franmalth embedded in Happy's head and force him to take them to Tartaros's main control room. Meanwhile, Silver separates Gray from the others for a private confrontation. Gray recognizes Silver as his father, who is supposedly dead, and denies his identity. Silver states that he is actually Deliora, the demon responsible for killing Silver, whose corpse he is currently possessing, enraging Gray.
252	77	"Gray vs. Silver"; Transliteration: "Gurei bāsasu Shirubā" (Japanese: グレイ vs. シルバー)	Directed by : Fumio Ito; Storyboarded by : Shinji Ishihira	Masashi Sogo	Tsutomu Ohno, Masahiko Itoshima, Takuro Sakurai & Mari Shirakawa	September 26, 2015
Gray furiously attacks Silver, whose Ice Demon Slayer powers make him immune to Gray's ice magic. Gray tries channeling Silver's magic against him as previously done against Doriate, but it also has no effect. With no other options, Gray contemplates using the same Iced Shell technique used by Ur to permanently freeze Deliora, despite needing to sacrifice his own body in order to do so. He reconsiders and ultimately grievously wounds Silver by hurling a cannonball through his chest. Gray refuses to kill Silver, however, reasoning that he is not Deliora as he claims to be. He is his actual father resurrected with ice demon slayer magic.
253	78	"A Silver Wish"; Transliteration: "Gin'iro no Omoi" (Japanese: 銀色の想い)	Directed by : Kazunobu Shimizu & Ayaka Tsujihashi; Storyboarded by : Shinji Ishihira	Atsuhiro Tomioka	Shoji Endo, Mikio Shiiba & Ki Yeop Kim	October 3, 2015
Silver reveals he is not Deliora, but rather the corpse of Gray's father, reanimated by Keyes's necromancy curse and driven by vengeance against Zeref's demons. He requests Gray to kill him, but Gray cannot bring himself to do so, despite the atrocities Silver has committed. As the two embrace, Silver telepathically contacts Juvia and instructs her to destroy Keyes and stop him from activating the Face bombs using Crawford's corpse. Juvia hesitates to do so, however, realizing that she would be separating Gray from his father forever. As Keyes taunts Juvia, she enters his body in the form of water and reluctantly destroys him from within. Before fading away, Silver bestows his Demon Slayer magic onto Gray, who promises to destroy E.N.D. as per Silver's request giving grey ice demon slayer magic.
254	79	"Air"	Directed by : Yoshitaka Fujimoto; Storyboarded by : Masami Shimoda	Fumihiko Shimo	Yusuke Isonai & Natsuki Watanabe	October 10, 2015
As the wizards continue to navigate Tartaros's headquarters, Torafuzar and Tempester assume their true "Etherious" forms to kill Natsu and Gajeel. The two Dragon Slayers activate their lightning and shadow powers, respectively, but their teamwork is hindered when they begin bickering over whose form is stronger. Their argument allows Torafuzar to flood the area with toxic water to kill the wizards. Gajeel quickly loses oxygen while fighting Torafuzar underwater, but Levy saves him from drowning by giving him air with a kiss.
255	80	"Steel"; Transliteration: "Hagane" (Japanese: 鋼)	Directed by : Yuji Suzuki; Storyboarded by : Akira Nishimori	Masashi Sogo	Yuji Shibata, Kenichi Watanabe, Yuji Ushijima & Katsunori Kikuchi	October 17, 2015
Gajeel tells Levy to use her magic to make oxygen for their drowning guildmates while he continues to battle Torafuzar. The demon hardens his body to neutralize Gajeel's attacks while Gajeel and Levy begin to succumb to Torafuzar's poison. However, Gajeel uses the carbon-rich water to furbish his iron body into steel, which cuts through Torafuzar's defenses and defeats him. Tempester attacks Gajeel after he is left weakened from the fight, but Laxus comes to Gajeel's rescue and faces Tempester in a rematch.
256	81	"Final Duels"; Transliteration: "Saigo no Ikkiuchi" (Japanese: 最後の一騎討ち)	Directed by : Akira Kato; Storyboarded by : Yasuhiro Tanabe	Masashi Sogo	Masahiko Itoshima, Masahiko Inuzuka & Haruka Saneto	October 24, 2015
Despite his ailing condition from their previous encounter, Laxus defeats Tempester and retrieves a sample of his blood, which he gives to Gajeel to deliver to Porlyusica and create an antidote for himself, the Raijin Tribe, and Yajima. Mortally wounded, Tempester turns into a cloud of Devil Particles again to kill the wizards, but Gray arrives and freezes the particles with his new Demon Slayer magic before his friends can be contaminated. Meanwhile, Erza and her allies reach the main control room to find Kyôka and Seilah successfully activating Face using Crawford's corpse. Mirajane arrives and defeats Seilah, leaving Erza to face Kyôka before the bombs detonate.
257	82	"Wings of Despair"; Transliteration: "Zetsubō no Tsubasa" (Japanese: 絶望の翼)	Yoshitaka Fujimoto	Atsuhiro Tomioka	Shingo Fujisaki	October 31, 2015
Erza and Kyôka's battle is interrupted when the wizards and demons hear a roaring sound in the distance. To their dread, they all recognize it as Acnologia, who wreaks destruction as he descends on the two guilds. Natsu, Gajeel, Wendy, Sting, and Rogue are immobilized as they begin to pulsate violently. Natsu suddenly hears Igneel's voice saying the time has come for him to stop Acnologia, and watches in awe as the missing fire dragon emerges from his body and battles Acnologia, revealed to have been inside him all along.
258	83	"Fire Dragon Iron Fist"; Transliteration: "Karyū no Tekken" (Japanese: 火竜の鉄拳)	Hiroshi Akiyama	Shōji Yonemura	Yuki Morimoto	November 7, 2015
Natsu intervenes between Igneel and Acnologia's battle, confused and angry over Igneel's unexplained return. Igneel tasks Natsu with stealing the book of E.N.D. from Mard Geer with the promise of answering Natsu's questions about his fourteen-year disappearance; however, he instructs Natsu to avoid opening or destroying it. Seeing the dragons as obstacles in his plans, Mard Geer telepathically orders Kyôka to hasten Face's detonation by merging with the control device. Kyôka complies, aware that this will end her own life, and assumes her Etherious form to kill Erza.
259	84	"00:00"	Directed by : Yuji Suzuki; Storyboarded by : Akira Nishimori	Atsuhiro Tomioka	Minoru Okabe, Masahiko Itoshima, Eri Ishikawa & Yuka Takemori	November 14, 2015
Kyôka uses her curse power to perpetually increase her own strength while maximizing Erza's sensitivity to pain and removing her senses; however, this causes Erza to develop a sixth sense, which she uses to defeat Kyôka. With Erza unable to continue fighting, Minerva stabs Kyôka with Erza's dropped sword, but not before the timer to Face's detonation reaches zero.
260	85	"The Girl in the Crystal"; Transliteration: "Suishō no Naka no Shōjo" (Japanese: 水晶の中の少女)	Sōichi Shimada	Fumihiko Shimo	Momoko Nagakawa	November 21, 2015
With twenty minutes remaining before Face's detonation, Natsu and Igneel fight Mard Geer and Acnologia, respectively. Sting and Rogue arrive on the battlefield and join Natsu, who reluctantly accepts and pushes Mard Geer back with their assistance. Enraged, Mard Geer places E.N.D.'s book down to use the full extent of his curse power to survive the Dragon Slayers' attacks. Meanwhile, Makarov telepathically contacts his guild to reveal their ultimate weapon, Lumen Histoire, which is revealed to be Mavis's body preserved in a crystal.
261	86	"Absolute Demon"; Transliteration: "Zettai no Akuma" (Japanese: 絶対の悪魔)	Directed by : Yoshitaka Fujimoto; Storyboarded by : Shinji Ishihira	Masashi Sogo	Shingo Fujisaki	November 28, 2015
Makarov instructs his guild to come to the ruins of their guildhall, privately requesting Doranbalt to erase their memories of Lumen Histoire after the battle. Meanwhile, Mard Geer reveals that the true purpose of the Etherious demons created by Zeref is to kill their creator, and that they aim to eradicate magic in Earth-land to lift the seal on E.N.D.'s book. Gray arrives and uses his demon-slaying magic on Mard Geer, which proves effective. Mard Geer summons a flower containing Ziemma, who has been transformed into a demon mightier than the Nine Demon Gates. Sting and Rogue fight their former master, allowing Natsu and Gray to focus on battling Mard Geer in his Etherious form.
262	87	"Memento Mori" (Japanese: メメント・モリ)	Directed by : Kazunobu Shimizu & Ayaka Tsujihashi; Storyboarded by : Akira Nishimori	Shōji Yonemura	Shoji Endo, Mikio Shiiba & Ki Yeop Kim	December 5, 2015
Sting and Rogue are able to destroy Ziemma, professing that Saber Tooth has improved since his removal from the guild. Meanwhile, Natsu and Gray continue their fight with Mard Geer, who performs his ultimate curse, Memento Mori, to erase the two from existence. With Natsu and Gray seemingly destroyed, Mard Geer declares that he will use the curse to kill Zeref.
263	88	"Soaring Above Ishgar"; Transliteration: "Ishugaru ni Mau" (Japanese: イシュガルに舞う)	Directed by : Yuji Suzuki; Storyboarded by : Masami Shimoda	Masashi Sogo	Yuji Shibata, Kenichi Watanabe, Takuro Sakurai & Masahiko Itoshima	December 12, 2015
Natsu and Gray emerge from the rubble left by Mard Geer's curse, having survived due to Gray taking on a partial demonic form and taking the brunt of the attack for Natsu. After Gray collapses, Natsu enters a natural Dragon Force state and performs one final onslaught on Mard Geer, but he runs out magic power to continue fighting the demon. However, Natsu reveals himself to be a decoy for Gray, who shoots Mard Geer down with an arrow of demon-slaying ice. Despite Igneel seemingly defeating Acnologia as well, Face's countdown reaches zero. With Fairy Tail's ally guilds unable to dismantle the bombs, the dragon guardians of Gajeel, Wendy, Sting, and Rogue emerge and destroy Face.
264	89	"Drops of Fire"; Transliteration: "Honō no Shizuku" (Japanese: 炎の雫)	Directed by : Fumio Ito; Storyboarded by : Shinji Ishihira	Masashi Sogo	Masahiko Inuzuka, Haruka Saneto & Yukiko Musa	December 19, 2015
After the dragons destroy the bombs across Ishgal, Face is deactivated, saving Earth-land from destruction. Acnologia gains a second wind and resumes his fight with Igneel, leaving Natsu and Gray to argue over whether to destroy E.N.D.'s book. However, Zeref arrives to retrieve the book and kills Mard Geer before vanishing. Igneel reveals that he and the other dragons sealed themselves within the Dragon Slayers to immunize them from becoming dragons like Acnologia, and to have the opportunity of killing Acnologia themselves. Igneel bites off Acnologia's arm, but Acnologia mercilessly kills the fire dragon, to Natsu's horror.
Tartaros Arc (Epilogue) (Note: Tarutarosu-hen (Shūshō) (冥府の門(タルタロス)編【終章】))
265	90	"Where the Power of Life Lies"; Transliteration: "Sore ga Ikiru Chikara da" (Japanese: それが生きる力だ)	Directed by : Yoshitaka Fujimoto; Storyboarded by : Shinji Ishihira	Masashi Sogo	Shingo Fujisaki	December 26, 2015
Following Igneel's death, the surviving dragons reveal that their souls have already been stolen by Acnologia, and so they pass on to the afterlife alongside Igneel. A heartbroken Natsu vows to become strong enough to kill Acnologia and avenge his father. During the following week, the wizards repair the damage left by their battle with Tartaros: Laxus and the Raijin Tribe return to full health; Gray forgives Juvia for her role in Silver's death; Erza is briefly visited by Jellal and Crime Sorcière, including the Oración Seis; and Minerva returns to Saber Tooth. After Doranbalt erases the guild's memories of Lumen Histoire, Makarov unveils an invisible Fairy Tail emblem on Doranbalt's shoulder, revealing him to be a guild member who erased his own memories to infiltrate the Magic Council. Makarov then decides to dissolve the guild. Lucy returns home to find a note from Natsu and Happy saying that they have begun an intense year-long training journey. Meanwhile, Zeref anticipates Natsu's next opportunity to defeat him, calling him Etherious Natsu Dragneel (E.N.D).
Fairy Tail Zero (Note: Stylized as FAIRY TAIL ZERØ)
266	91	"The Fairy in Your Heart"; Transliteration: "Kokoro no Naka no Yōsei" (Japanese: 心の中の妖精)	Directed by : Hiroshi Akiyama; Storyboarded by : Shinji Ishihira	Fumihiko Shimo	Masahiko Itoshima, Eri Ishikawa & Yuka Takemori	January 9, 2016
Natsu and Happy travel to Sirius Island to search for Mavis's grave, and discover the ruins of an abandoned village. In X679, a six-year-old Mavis lives in the village as a servant of the Red Lizard guild following the deaths of her parents. One day, the guild is destroyed in a turf war with the rival guild Blue Skull. Mavis rescues Zera, the daughter of Red Lizard's master Zeeself, and escapes into the forest with her; touched by her kindness, Zera offers her friendship to Mavis before collapsing. Seven years later, a trio of treasure hunters—Yuri Dreyar, Makarov's father; Precht Gaebolg, Hades' former identity; and Warrod Sequen—search for a coveted jewel called the Sirius Orb on Sirius Island, where Mavis continues to live.
267	92	"The Adventure Begins"; Transliteration: "Bōken no Hajimari" (Japanese: 冒険の始まり)	Directed by : Akira Kato; Storyboarded by : Takashi Ikebata	Shōji Yonemura	Minoru Okabe, Takuro Sakurai, Mari Shirakawa & Young Sang Kwon	January 16, 2016
The thirteen-year-old Mavis lives alone on Sirius Island with an older Zera, who has become close friends with her. Mavis meets Yuri as he searches the island for the Sirius Orb, which is the island's cherished relic. Yuri engages Mavis in a game of wits over the ownership of the treasure, but Mavis uses her tactical knowledge and loopholes in the game's rules to beat him. However, their game proves pointless when Precht and Warrod inform them that the orb is already missing. Mavis deduces that Blue Skull possesses the orb, and convinces the reluctant treasure hunters to take her and Zera with them to retrieve it.
268	93	"Treasure Hunt"; Transliteration: "Torejā Hanto" (Japanese: トレジャーハント)	Directed by : Masato Sato; Storyboarded by : Masami Shimoda	Masashi Sogo	Kumiko Shishido	January 23, 2016
Mavis pesters the treasure hunters with her curiosity during an oversea voyage, overhearing that they are in need of funds for their journey. While playing with dolphins in the ocean, Mavis discovers an underwater temple and, hoping to prove her usefulness, goes diving to explore it in search of treasure. She becomes trapped in a chamber with a monstrous fish, but Yuri and Warrod are alerted to her whereabouts and come to her rescue. Mavis finds what she believes to be a secret exit, only to inadvertently trigger a booby trap that demolishes the temple. Nevertheless, the three manage to escape with several pieces of treasure in tow.
269	94	"Dancing with Blades"; Transliteration: "Yaiba to Odoru" (Japanese: 刃と踊る)	Yoshitaka Fujimoto	Atsuhiro Tomioka	Shingo Fujisaki	January 30, 2016
Mavis and the others disembark at the port town of Hargeon. Following a sightseeing tour, Mavis accompanies Precht as he unsuccessfully attempts to gather information on Blue Skull from the townspeople, who avoid him due to his reticent and intimidating nature. After Precht saves a boy at risk of being crushed by a rotting tree, he and Mavis are directed to a bar that they quickly discover to be a branch of Blue Skull. Precht skillfully dispatches the hostile patrons and Mavis conjures an illusory wolf monster to threaten the bartender into revealing Blue Skull's base of operations, Magnolia. The two exit the bar to continue their search, unknowingly passing Zeref along the way.
270	95	"Moonlit Lake"; Transliteration: "Tsukiakari no Mizuumi" (Japanese: 月明かりの湖)	Directed by : Kazunobu Shimizu & Ayaka Tsujihashi; Storyboarded by : Akira Nishimori	Fumihiko Shimo	Shoji Endo, Mikio Shiiba & Kim Kiyeod	February 6, 2016
Mavis and the others set up camp in a forest en route to Magnolia. The group comes across a section of dead trees, which reminds the treasure hunters of an earlier treasure hunt through a poisonous valley. Precht recounts the adventure to Mavis and Zera, demonstrating the trio's strong sense of camaraderie despite their differences. Mavis and the treasure hunters discuss what to do with the Sirius Orb once they find it, with Mavis certain that Yuri will relinquish the treasure; Zera expresses her distrust of the hunters, resolving to learn magic and protect Mavis. Later, the group reaches Magnolia to find the city in a state of disrepair, with a blue, skeletal dragon looming over Kardia Cathedral.
271	96	"Blue Skull"; Transliteration: "Burū Sukaru" (Japanese: 青い髑髏(ブルースカル))	Directed by : Fumio Ito; Storyboarded by : Akira Nishimori	Shōji Yonemura	Masahiko Inuzuka, Haruka Saneto & Yukiko Musa	February 13, 2016
Mavis and the hunters wander the desolate Magnolia in search of information on Blue Skull and the Sirius Orb. They rescue a baker and her daughter named Mako and Miko from harassers from Blue Skull, learning about the oppressive regime the guild has imposed on the once thriving city. After witnessing an innocent bystander getting killed by Blue Skull wizards, the group fights the wizards and resolves to liberate the city. When Blue Skull's reinforcements arrive, Mavis conjures an illusory army of soldiers to intimidate them, but the guild's master, Geoffrey, recognizes her bluff. Outnumbered and overpowered, Yuri and Precht are injured and the group retreats into the forest to safety.
272	97	"Conveyer of Magic"; Transliteration: "Madō o Tsutaeru Mono" (Japanese: 魔道を伝える者)	Suzuki Yuji	Masashi Sogo	Kenichi Watanabe, Yuji Shibata & Masahiko Itoshima	February 20, 2016
While she and the others recuperate from their failed attack on Blue Skull, Mavis encounters Zeref alone in the forest. Oblivious to his identity as the infamous dark wizard, Mavis takes sympathy on him when she fathoms that he is cursed with black magic that kills everything around him against his will. After Mavis presents him a display of illusory animals in a show of friendship, Zeref agrees on a whim to assist her and her friends' fight against Blue Skull by teaching them magic. Over time, Yuri and Precht prove themselves naturally adept at using magic for combat, while Warrod discovers his talents are supportive and non-combative. As soon as the group feel confident in their abilities, Zeref departs and muses over the time he has cherished with Mavis, but concedes that he is also responsible for her eventual death.
273	98	"Treasure"; Transliteration: "Takaramono" (Japanese: 宝物)	Directed by : Yoshitaka Fujimoto; Storyboarded by : Takeshi Furuta	Atsuhiro Tomioka	Shingo Fujisaki & Natsuki Watanabe	February 27, 2016
Mavis and the treasure hunters rally the citizens of Magnolia to stage an uprising against Blue Skull while they enact their plan to save the city. Yuri and Precht defeat the wizards and find the Sirius Orb inside the cathedral, while Warrod lures Geoffrey towards an illusion of a burning Magnolia, where he is encaged by Mavis and Zera. Geoffrey warns that the orb is imbued with evil energy that could destroy the city when touched. Mavis attempts to stop Yuri from stealing the orb, but he dismisses her warning and takes hold of the treasure. He is overtaken by its power and merges with the skeletal dragon over the cathedral, rampaging through the city as a mindless monster.
274	99	"Law"; Transliteration: "Rō" (Japanese: ロウ)	Soichi Shimada	Atsuhiro Tomioka	Momoko Nagakawa	March 5, 2016
Mavis prepares to cast Law, a powerful magic spell learned from Zeref, to free Yuri from the blue dragon. Despite Zera's warnings of the spell's adverse effects, Mavis successfully performs the spell and destroys the Sirius Orb controlling Yuri, falling unconscious. Later, Yuri awakens and learns that Mavis's spell has permanently halted her physical maturity. He apologizes to Mavis and promises to protect her as a friend from now on. When she accepts his friendship, Yuri admits to her that neither he nor anyone but her can see or hear Zera, revealing Zera to be an illusion created by Mavis.
275	100	"Eternal Adventure"; Transliteration: "Eien no Bōken" (Japanese: 永遠の冒険)	Directed by : Hiroshi Akiyama & Ayaka Tsujihashi; Storyboarded by : Hiroshi Akiyama	Fumihiko Shimo	See note for the ADs (Note: Eri Ishikawa, Takuro Sakurai, Yuuki Morimoto, Mari Shirakawa, Masahiko Itoshima, Kiyoshi Matsushita & Kenichi Watanabe)	March 12, 2016
Zera confirms that she is an illusion Mavis subconsciously created after the real Zera died during Blue Skull's attack on Sirius Island. She encourages Mavis to move on, fading away permanently when Mavis tearfully accepts the truth about her. Yuri is able to see Zera as she vanishes, and she entrusts him with looking after Mavis. While Mavis contemplates what to do next, the people of Magnolia express their own anxiety for the future, as Blue Skull's regime had provided a certain degree of stability. Mavis decides to help the townspeople by establishing a wizard guild of her own, naming the guild Fairy Tail in Zera's memory. The treasure hunters resign from their old guild, Sylph Labyrinth, and join Fairy Tail with Mavis as guild master. In the epilogue, Makarov is born, Mavis and Yuri are dead, Precht becomes obsessed with dark magic, and Warrod departs from the guild, which dissolves in X791.
Avatar Arc (Prologue)
276	101	"Challenger"; Transliteration: "Chōsensha" (Japanese: 挑戦者)	Directed by : Yoshitaka Fujimoto; Storyboarded by : Akira Nishimori	Shōji Yonemura	Shingo Fujisaki	March 19, 2016
In X792, one year after Fairy Tail's disbandment, Lucy works as an editorial trainee for the Weekly Sorcerer magazine to keep track of her wayward friends in the hope of reuniting with them. While helping cover a match at the Grand Magic Games in Crocus, a cloaked stranger arrives and disrupts the proceedings after the final match. After announcing himself as a challenger, the stranger effortlessly overpowers the competition's winners with fire magic powerful enough to melt Domus Flau. To Lucy's shock, the stranger unveils himself as Natsu, having finished his training; he and Happy greet her as she expresses her newfound faith in Fairy Tail's return.
277	102	"Message of Flame"; Transliteration: "Honō no Messēji" (Japanese: 炎のメッセージ)	Shinji Ishihira	Masashi Sogo	Shinji Takeuchi, Akihiko Sano, Masahiko Inuzuka & Haruka Saneto	March 26, 2016
King Toma pardons Natsu for destroying Domus Flau on account of his repeated past efforts in saving the kingdom. While relating his training journey to Lucy, including a chance encounter with Gildarts, he and Happy are devastated to learn about Fairy Tail's dissolution, and that their sudden departure had greatly hurt Lucy. The two spend the night at her apartment and discover the detailed notes Lucy has made to keep track of their guildmates. Lucy awakens the next morning to see her home surrounded by the local army in search of Natsu. Natsu and Happy make a getaway with Lucy, revealing they have emblazoned Fairy Tail's name on the side of Toma's palace, signifying their intent to reunify the guild. After fleeing Crocus, the trio embark on a journey in search of their friends.

== Music ==
=== Opening themes ===
No.	Song Title	Artist	Episodes
15	"Masayume Chasing"	BoA	176–188
16	"Strike Back"	Back-On	189–203
17	"Mysterious Magic"	Do As Infinity	204–214
18	"Break Out"	V6	215–226
19	"Yume-iro Graffiti"	Tackey & Tsubasa	227–239
20	"Never-End Tale"	Tatsuyuki Kobayashi & Konomi Suzuki	240–252
21	"Believe in Myself"	Edge of Life	253–265
22	"Ashita wo Narase"	Kavka Shishido	266–277

=== Ending themes ===
No.	Song Title	Artist	Episodes
15	"Kimi to Kare to Boku to Kanojo to"	Breathe	176–188
16	"Kokoro no Kagi"	May J.	189–203
17	"Kimi no Mirai"	Root Five	204–214
18	"Don't Let Me Down"	Mariya Nishiuchi	215–226
19	"Never Ever"	Tokyo Girls' Style	227–239
20	"Forever Here"	Yoko Ishida	240–252
21	"Azayaka na Tabiji"	Megumi Mori	253–265
22	"Landscape"	Solidemo	266–277
