= List of Record of Ragnarok episodes =

Record of Ragnarok is an anime television series based on the manga series of the same title written by Shinya Umemura and Takumi Fukui and illustrated by Azychika. In December 2020, it was announced that the series would receive an anime series adaptation produced by Warner Bros. Japan and animated by Graphinica. It is directed by Masao Ōkubo, with series composition by Kazuyuki Fudeyasu, characters designs by Masaki Saito and music composed by Yasuharu Takanashi. Licensed by Netflix, the series premiered on June 17, 2021, on the streaming service. The opening theme is "Kamigami" (KAMIGAMI-神噛-; lit. "Gods" / "God Biting") performed by Maximum the Hormone, while the ending theme is "Fukahi" (不可避; lit. "Unavoidable") performed by SymaG. In North America, the first season has been licensed for home video release by Viz Media and was released on Blu-ray on April 4, 2023.

On August 17, 2021, it was announced that the series was renewed for a second season. The main staff returned from the first season, with Yumeta Company producing the series alongside Graphinica, and Yuka Yamada writing the scripts alongside Fudeyasu. The season consists of 15 episodes, with the first 10 episodes premiering on January 26, 2023, and the remaining five releasing on July 12 of the same year. The opening theme is "Rude, Loose Dance" (ルードルーズダンス, Rūdo Rūzu Dansu) performed by Minami, while the ending theme is "Inori" (祈; lit. "Prayer") performed by Masatoshi Ono.

In March 2025, it was announced that the series was renewed for a third season. The season features a different staff from previous seasons. It was animated by Yumeta Company and Maru Animation, and directed by Koichi Hatsumi, with Yasuyuki Mutō serving as the main writer, and Yōko Tanabe and Hisashi Kawashima as new character designers. Yasuharu Takanashi is returning to compose the music. The season premiered on December 10, 2025. The opening theme is "Dead or Alive", performed by Glay, while the ending theme is "Last Breath, Last Record", performed by Saori Hayami.

== Series overview ==
Series overview
Season	Episodes		Originally released
1	12		June 17, 2021
2	15	10	January 26, 2023
2	15	5	July 12, 2023
3	15		December 10, 2025

== Episodes ==
=== Season 1 (2021) ===
No. overall	No. in season	Title	Directed by	Written by	Storyboarded by	Original release date
1	1	"Ragnarok"; Transliteration: "Ragunaroku" (Japanese: ラグナロク)	Yasutaka Yamamoto	Kazuyuki Fudeyasu	Masao Ōkubo	June 17, 2021
At the Council of Valhalla, the gods gather and decide that humanity is irredeemable and must be destroyed. Brunhilde, leader of the Valkyries, objects to this decision, proposing that the gods demonstrate their mercy and power by testing mankind. She convinces the gods to hold Ragnarok, a competition in which thirteen humans and thirteen gods fight in duels to the death, the victor being the first side to achieve seven victories. Should they win, mankind will be spared for a thousand years. For the first match, the gods' representative is the Norse god Thor, while the human representative is the Chinese warlord Lü Bu.
2	2	"Worthy Opponent"; Transliteration: "Kōtekishu" (Japanese: 好敵手)	Hiroyuki Kitakubo	Kazuyuki Fudeyasu	Masao Ōkubo	June 17, 2021
Lü Bu's past is explored: contrary to recorded history, he surrendered to Cao Cao out of boredom after realizing his own strength was unparalleled. Lü Bu's ferocity forces Thor to fight seriously, making the gods realize the former is using a divine weapon (one that can hurt and even kill gods) to fight, courtesy of Brunhilde, who convinced her Valkyrie sisters to assist the humans.
3	3	"Killer Move"; Transliteration: "Hissatsu Waza" (Japanese: 必殺技)	Takushi Shikatani	Kazuyuki Fudeyasu	Masao Ōkubo	June 17, 2021
In a flashback to before the first match, Brunhilde summons the fourth of her sisters, Randgriz, and orders her to help Lü Bu by transforming into a sacred weapon for him in a process known as Völundr. In the present, Randgriz's assistance puts Lü Bu on even ground with Thor, who removes his restraints and unleashes his full power. Zeus, king of the gods, is thrilled by the Valkyries' involvement in Ragnarok.
4	4	"Joy"; Transliteration: "Kanki" (Japanese: 歓喜)	Hirokazu Yamada	Kazuyuki Fudeyasu	Kōjin Ochi	June 17, 2021
Thor shatters Lü Bu's legs, and the latter's horse, Red Hare, joins the fray to support him. However, Thor breaks Lü Bu's weapon, reverting Randgriz to her original form. Lü Bu rejoices at having finally fought a worthy opponent before being beheaded by Thor, sealing the first victory for the gods.
5	5	"File No.00000000001"	Yasutaka Yamamoto	Kazuyuki Fudeyasu	Yasutaka Yamamoto	June 17, 2021
Red Hare and Lü Bu's army, who had been watching the battle, charge at Thor, who kills them in respect for his fallen opponent. Brunhilde remains stoic despite knowing that Lü Bu and Randgriz's souls were permanently destroyed. Adam, the first man, is chosen as the human representative for the second match. The Hindu god Shiva is initially chosen as Adam's opponent, but Zeus takes the former's place, to Brunhilde's chagrin.
6	6	"Great Emulation"; Transliteration: "Karei Naru Mohō" (Japanese: 華麗なる模倣)	Kōjin Ochi	Kazuyuki Fudeyasu	Masao Ōkubo	June 17, 2021
Adam is equipped with a knuckleduster formed from the spirit of the seventh Valkyrie, Reginleif, while Zeus fights barehanded. Zeus has the advantage at first, but Adam is able to dodge and mimic the former's techniques, astonishing the crowd.
7	7	"Expelled from Paradise"; Transliteration: "Rakuen Tsuihō" (Japanese: 楽園追放)	Masahito Otani	Kazuyuki Fudeyasu	Kōjin Ochi	June 17, 2021
Adam's backstory is explained: he and his wife Eve lived in paradise until Eve refused the Serpent's advances, causing the latter to frame Eve for a heinous crime. A jury of gods ruled against Eve, who was banished from paradise. Adam killed the Serpent in revenge and left paradise with Eve, developing an intense hatred for the gods. In the present, Zeus assumes his true form, powering up significantly.
8	8	"Grace Abounding"; Transliteration: "Afureru Ai" (Japanese: あふれる愛)	Shin'ya Une	Kazuyuki Fudeyasu	Masao Ōkubo	June 17, 2021
Adam is able to adapt to Zeus' increase in strength, but begins to suffer from the physical and mental strain. He succumbs to exhaustion just before dealing the finishing blow, dying along with Reginleif. Despite another loss, the humans in the audience celebrate Adam's efforts and express their defiance against the gods. For the third match, the Greek god Poseidon is chosen to fight for the gods, while the famed Japanese swordsman Kojirō Sasaki steps up as his opponent.
9	9	"Tyrant of the Ocean"; Transliteration: "Taikai no Bōkun" (Japanese: 大海の暴君)	Hirokazu Yamada	Kazuyuki Fudeyasu	Masao Ōkubo	June 17, 2021
Poseidon begins the third match, armed with his trident, against Sasaki, who wields a sword formed from the spirit of the second Valkyrie, Hrist. After mentally simulating several possible approaches, Sasaki realizes making the first move may be futile. Poseidon's backstory is explored: he killed his own brother Adamas for amassing an army to rebel against Zeus, and has always been assured of his own perfection and infallibility.
10	10	"Greatest Loser"; Transliteration: "Saikyō no Haisha" (Japanese: 最強の敗者)	Akira Mano	Kazuyuki Fudeyasu	Yasutaka Yamamoto	June 17, 2021
While he was alive, Sasaki sought unconventional methods to improve his swordsmanship and analytical skills. In the present, Sasaki and Poseidon face off. The former is initially able to predict and dodge the latter's strikes, but Poseidon moves faster than Sasaki can anticipate, wounding him.
11	11	"The Swallow Gazes into the Abyss"; Transliteration: "Tsubame ga Mita Shin'en" (Japanese: 燕が見た深淵)	Kōjin Ochi	Kazuyuki Fudeyasu	Kōjin Ochi	June 17, 2021
Poseidon's assault breaks Sasaki's sword in two. After reminiscing about his death at the hands of fellow swordsman Miyamoto Musashi, Sasaki vows not to lose against the dispassionate and condescending Poseidon. With Hrist's assistance, Sasaki's broken weapon is reforged into two new swords, granting him a second wind.
12	12	"And Ragnarok Goes On"; Transliteration: "Soshite Ragunaroku wa Tsuzuku" (Japanese: そしてラグナロクはつづく)	Kōjin Ochi; Toshikatsu Tokoro	Kazuyuki Fudeyasu	Masao Ōkubo	June 17, 2021
Poseidon steps up his offense, putting pressure on Sasaki. However, thanks to the moral support of his fellow swordsmen in the audience, Sasaki is able to win the match. Zeus acknowledges mankind's strength, realizes Brunhilde truly intends to defeat the gods, and resolves to take Ragnarok seriously. Hercules is chosen as the gods' representative for the fourth match. In a move that shocks both sides, Brunhilde sends mankind's most devious murderer, Jack the Ripper, to fight.

=== Season 2 (2023) ===
No. overall	No. in season	Title	Directed by	Written by	Storyboarded by	Original release date
Part 1
13	1	"Good vs. Evil"; Transliteration: "Seigi VS Aku!" (Japanese: 正義VS悪!)	Yasutaka Yamamoto	Kazuyuki Fudeyasu	Masao Ōkubo	January 26, 2023
Before the fourth match, the partly human Hercules declares his intention to plead with the gods to spare humanity if he wins. In the interest of fairness, he agrees to Jack the Ripper's request to make the arena a replica of 19th century London. Hercules offers to spare Jack if he surrenders, but the latter refuses. He uses a variety of weapons and traps against Hercules, claiming his divine weapon to be a magic satchel that produces divine weapons. A furious Hercules channels the power of mythical creatures to land his first blow on Jack.
14	2	"The Indomitable War God"; Transliteration: "Fukutsu no Tōshin" (Japanese: 不屈の闘神)	Hiroyuki Kitakubo	Kazuyuki Fudeyasu	Masao Ōkubo	January 26, 2023
Hercules' incredible powers come at a cost: his tattoos grow and spread across his body as he uses them, threatening him with a painful death if he pushes himself too far. Born Alcides, he had a strong sense of justice despite his weak constitution. When Ares attempted to wipe out his hometown, Alcides resisted him with the godly strength he obtained by consuming ambrosia. Zeus stopped the fight and invited Alcides to join the gods. Alcides accepted the invitation on the condition that the gods would never bring down their wrath upon humanity again, renaming himself Hercules. In the present, the fourth match continues. Jack comments on Hercules' aura, wondering aloud what color it will turn when he dies.
15	3	"Birth of a Monster"; Transliteration: "Kaibutsu no Tanjō" (Japanese: 怪物の誕生)	Takushi Shikatani	Kazuyuki Fudeyasu	Masao Ōkubo	January 26, 2023
Jack's past is explained: he was born with a special ability allowing him to perceive others' auras and emotions. Despite living in poverty, Jack was comforted by the bright glow of his mother Mary's love. However, when Jack's father broke his promise to marry her, Mary stopped caring for Jack. He realized that the color of Mary's aura did not reflect her love for him, but rather her desire for the high life she had hoped to secure for herself by having Jack. He eventually killed Mary and become obsessed with the color of her fear, leading to his calling as a serial killer. In the present, Jack severely injures Hercules, revealing his true weapon to be his gloves, which turn ordinary objects into divine weapons on contact. In a flashback to before the fourth match, the eleventh Valkyrie, Hlökk, refused to work with Jack when Brunhilde asked, only for him to overpower her, forcing her cooperation.
16	4	"The Final Labor"; Transliteration: "Saigo no Miwaza" (Japanese: 最後の御業)	Hirokazu Yamada	Kazuyuki Fudeyasu	Kōjin Ochi	January 26, 2023
An injured Hercules sympathizes with Jack's painful past, declaring his love for humanity. He uses his most powerful technique, putting his life at risk in exchange for more power. Jack is gravely wounded in the ensuing melee, putting him at a great disadvantage. The humans in the audience are silent except for Anne, Jack's mother's former colleague whom he lived with as a child.
17	5	"Requiem"; Transliteration: "Chinkon" (Japanese: 鎮魂)	Yasutaka Yamamoto	Kazuyuki Fudeyasu	Yasutaka Yamamoto	January 26, 2023
Jack uses his gloves' power on his own blood and uses it to fatally impale Hercules. Hercules uses his final moments to reiterate his love for humanity. Göll, the youngest of the Valkyrie sisters, reprimands Brunhilde for not expressing emotion for their late friend, but she memorializes Hercules along with Ragnarok's other casualties in private. The Norse god Loki accuses ascended religious figure Buddha of teaching the Valkyries about Völundr. The Seven Lucky Gods appear, grateful for the excuse to kill Buddha. As they and Loki prepare to attack, Sasaki and other figures from Japanese history show up to defend Buddha.
18	6	"Conflicting Motives"; Transliteration: "Sorezore no Omowaku" (Japanese: それぞれの思惑)	Kōjin Ochi	Kazuyuki Fudeyasu	Masao Ōkubo	January 26, 2023
Zeus and the Norse god Odin stop the ensuing battle and unsuccessfully try to rein in Buddha's meddling. To capitalize on humanity's momentum, Brunhilde sends the most powerful sumo wrestler in history, Tameemon Raiden, to fight in the fifth match, with the assistance of the third Valkyrie, Thrud. His opponent is Shiva.
19	7	"Hundred Seals"; Transliteration: "Hyakuhei" (Japanese: 百閉)	Masahito Otani	Kazuyuki Fudeyasu	Kōjin Ochi	January 26, 2023
Raiden's past is explored: as a child, his congenital muscular hypertrophy caused him grievous injury until he found a way to seal his own strength. In the present, the fifth match begins. Raiden shocks Shiva by being strong enough to hurt him without a divine weapon. With a loincloth formed from Thrud's spirit protecting him from the backlash of his full strength, Raiden unseals his power, mangling one of Shiva's four arms.
20	8	"The Pinnacle of 1116"; Transliteration: "1116 no Teppen" (Japanese: 1116の天辺)	Shin'ya Une	Kazuyuki Fudeyasu	Masao Ōkubo	January 26, 2023
In Shiva's past, he lived an idyllic life until his best friend and fellow god Rudra asked him to join him on a pursuit of greatness. After taking down every other Hindu god together, Rudra challenged Shiva. Shiva reluctantly defeated him, becoming the strongest in the Hindu pantheon. It was the last time both friends saw each other. In the present, Shiva speeds up his movements, combusting from the air friction, and he lands a blow that disables one of Raiden's eyes.
21	9	"Resonance"; Transliteration: "Kyōmei" (Japanese: 共鳴)	Hirokazu Yamada	Kazuyuki Fudeyasu	Masao Ōkubo	January 26, 2023
More of Raiden's backstory is shown: growing up, he was inspired by his mother to use his strength to help others. He became a sumo wrestler to earn money for his starving village, eventually becoming a celebrated champion. However, when his prowess began to incite fear in the world of sumo wrestling, he suppressed his strength to avoid seriously harming or killing his opponents. In the present, Raiden strains and damages his muscles in the process of further injuring Shiva, leaving the latter with only one functional arm. Meeting for the first time in millennia, Rudra appears in the audience to cheer Shiva on, giving him the courage to consume his own life force to power up.
22	10	"The Brink"; Transliteration: "Gakeppuchi" (Japanese: 崖っぷち)	Akira Mano	Kazuyuki Fudeyasu	Yasutaka Yamamoto	January 26, 2023
The battle turns into one of endurance as Raiden's muscles deteriorate while Shiva's life force dwindles. Eventually, Shiva destroys Raiden's arm. Realizing his imminent death, Raiden asks Thrud to separate from him so she will not die, but she professes her love for him, vowing to share his fate. Shiva beheads him, killing Thrud as well, securing the gods' third victory. Buddha agrees to Zeus' request for him to fight in the sixth match, only to later declare that he is fighting on humanity's side.
Part 2
23	11	"Round Six"; Transliteration: "Dai 6-kaisen" (Japanese: 第6回戦)	Unknown	Unknown	TBA	July 12, 2023
Brunhilde reveals that she learned Völundr from Buddha just before Ragnarok. Realizing that he was manipulated into betraying the gods, Buddha threatened to retaliate against her. In the present, the Seven Gods appear as his opponents, fusing together into their original form: Zerofuku.
24	12	"Zero"; Transliteration: "Rei" (Japanese: 零)	Unknown	Unknown	TBA	July 12, 2023
Zerofuku was once a benevolent god, taking on mankind's misfortune to relieve them of suffering. However, the more he helped humans, the more they indulged in depravity and excess, leading him to have a mental breakdown. When a visiting Buddha told Zerofuku that happiness can't be forced upon others, the latter developed a hatred of humans, splitting into the Seven Lucky Gods to suppress his bloodlust. In the present, Buddha's clairvoyance allows him to avoid injury, but Zerofuku gains power as he experiences misfortune during the fight.
25	13	"The Strongest Puberty in History"; Transliteration: "Shijō Saikyō no Shishunki" (Japanese: 史上最強の思春期)	Unknown	Unknown	TBA	July 12, 2023
Buddha's past is explored: born Siddhartha Gautama, he lived a carefree life as a prince until a dying relative inspired him find his own path to happiness outside the destiny he was born into. Gautama abandoned his royal life to wander, amassing followers and eventually attaining enlightenment. In the present, Buddha convinces Zerofuku that he is the master of his own happiness, causing the latter to revert to his benevolent form. However, he is turned against his will into a massive demonic creature known as Papiyas.
26	14	"Legend of the Underworld"; Transliteration: "Meikai no Densetsu" (Japanese: 冥界の伝説)	Unknown	Unknown	TBA	July 12, 2023
The Greek god Hades identifies Papiyas as a monster capable of great destruction, speculating that his return was caused by experiments conducted by the greater demon Beelzebub. Papiyas claims that his emergence completely erased Zerofuku from the world. Buddha's clairvoyance is ineffective against him, and loses an eye to one of the Papiyas' blows. Despite his injuries, Buddha declares his resolve to kill any god who prevents him from saving mankind.
27	15	"The Way of Light"; Transliteration: "Hikari no Michi" (Japanese: 光の道)	Unknown	Unknown	TBA	July 12, 2023
Buddha is grievously injured and his weapon is broken. However, he realizes Zerofuku's soul still lingers, performing a Völundr with its remnants to create a new weapon. With it, Buddha overpowers Papiyas, winning the sixth round for mankind. Buddha makes peace with Zerofuku before the latter's soul disappears. With the gods and humans now tied at three wins each, Hades intends to fight in the next match. Odin admonishes Beelzebub for nearly ruining his secret plans. After learning of Hades' involvement, Brunhilde chooses the next fighter for humanity: Chinese emperor Qin Shi Huang.

=== Season 3 (2025) ===
No. overall	No. in season	Title	Directed by	Written by	Storyboarded by	Original release date
28	1	"Prologue: Recollections"; Transliteration: "Purorōgu: Tsuioku" (Japanese: プロローグ：追憶)	Unknown	Unknown	TBA	December 10, 2025
After the sixth match, an injured Buddha teases Brunhilde about her true desire from staging Ragnarök, and she ignores the statement when Göll questions her. Brunhilde later encounters an imposter, who she instantly addresses as Nostradamus, one of humanity's fighters. Nostradamus wants to go next, but Brunhilde denies his request. When he complains, she threatens to send him back to Helheim, where he became the first human imprisoned there after destroying part of Bifröst. Hermes and Brunhilde individually reflect on how the first six matches have gone so far, as the seventh match between Qin Shi Huang and Hades is set to begin.: This episode serves mostly as a quick recap of the featured matches portrayed in the first two seasons.
29	2	"King vs. King"; Transliteration: "Ō VS Ō" (Japanese: 王VS王)	Unknown	Unknown	TBA	December 10, 2025
Ares initially volunteers to fight, but Hades insists on avenging Poseidon. Brunhilde is informed of Hades' participation and opts to select Qin Shi Huang. Qin inadvertently enters the gods seating area and easily overpowers Ares after he attempted to make him leave. On a makeshift ramp held up by the former Emperors of China, Qin enters the arena and performs a Völundr with the tenth Valkyrie, Alvitr, to create divine vambraces. Hades meets with Poseidon's servant Proteus, who gives him his trident remnants to fuse with his bident. The match begins with Hades mimicking Poseidon's attacks and initially wounding Qin, before he himself is sent flying after Qin's armor deflects his attack.
30	3	"Chi You"; Transliteration: "Shi Yū" (Japanese: 蚩尤)	Unknown	Unknown	TBA	December 10, 2025
In Ancient China, Qin began his quest to unify China by challenging Chiyou, the demon god of military arts, and killing him after six days. Brunhilde explains the five tools of war that Qin has mastered in his martial arts. When Qin answers his question of what makes a king, Hades laughs at how he & Poseidon are alike. After Hades crushes him with his spear, Qin removes his blindfold and uses his Force of the Phoenix technique to reverse Hades' attack again, which Hades deduces as Qin's eyes and breath being able to locate and disrupt critical "star" points, though causing similar pain to himself. Abandoned as a child, Qin meets a mysterious woman while being held hostage.
31	4	"A Promise and an Oath"; Transliteration: "Yakusoku to Chikai" (Japanese: 約束と誓い)	Unknown	Unknown	TBA	December 10, 2025
Qin, Known as Ying Zheng as a boy, meets his new bodyguard Chun Yan, who learns of his ailment brought on by the Zhao people's hatred of Qin. Chun Yan berates him for holding in his emotional pain and comforts him when he finally lets it out. After becoming the crown prince, Chun Yan thwarts an assassination attempt, but dies in Ying Zheng's arms, promising to become the greatest of kings. Hades moves past Qin's "air bullets" and knees him directly in the chin, but is successfully countered by Qin's leg kick.
32	5	"Pride of the King of Helheim"; Transliteration: "Meiō no Kyōji" (Japanese: 冥王の矜持)	Unknown	Unknown	TBA	December 10, 2025
Hades gouges his chest and fuses his blood with his bident to form the spear Desmos, which he uses to break through Qin's defence and shatters his left spaulder. Ares recounts the Gigantomachy: Gaia's failed attempt to overthrow Zeus and Olympus with her Giants. After the Titans escaped Tartarus, Hades alone confronted and killed all of them, just to protect his younger siblings, confirmed by an alive Adamas, now going by Adamantine. With no other option, Qin commands Alvtir to change their Völundr into a sword. Though Hades severs his left arm, Qin refuses to back down.
33	6	"Return of the King"; Transliteration: "Ō no Kikan" (Japanese: 王の帰還)	Unknown	Unknown	TBA	December 10, 2025
Using Force of the Phoenix with his sword, Qin shatters Desmos and deals a fatal blow to Hades, stunning everyone as humanity wins the seventh round. Adamas confronts Brunhilde & Göll and demands Qin. After Brunhilde refuses to divulge his location, Adamas attacks them, only for Beelzebub to slice off his hand, causing him to leave with a threat, while Beelzebub warns Brunhilde that many gods feel the same as him. Buddha requests one of humanity's fighters, Sakata Kintoki, to investigate a hero named Siegfried. Beelzebub states to Hermes his intention to fight next, while Brunhilde enters the chambers of Nikola Tesla.
34	7	"Satan"; Transliteration: "Satan" (Japanese: サタン)	Unknown	Unknown	TBA	December 10, 2025
Tesla and the ninth Valkyrie sister Göndul perform a Völundr to create a mechanical exoskeleton. In heaven, Beelzebub was feared by other deities, but is befriended by the angels Lucifer, Azazel, and Samael and coerced into picking apples from Eden. After feeling happy, Beelzebub awakens one morning to find his friends dead, with the belief that Satan killed them. While researching how to seek revenge, Beelzebub is approached by Lilith, who offers her help. Beelzebub learns that Satan dwells within him, and kills Lilith due to his love for her. Lilith eases his pain and curses him so he can't die.
35	8	"Light vs. Shadow"; Transliteration: "Yami VS Hikari" (Japanese: 闇VS光)	Unknown	Unknown	TBA	December 10, 2025
The arena is remodeled for the eighth match between Beelzebub and Nikola Tesla. Tesla regals how creativity drives humanity forward, but Beelzebub shuns him away by cracking the ground with weaponized vibrations. By switching hands, Beelzebub uses his divine treasure staff to use sound vibrations for offense and defense, knocking Tesla back. Beelzebub is annoyed at Tesla's fascination with the vibrations he uses and dismisses him, only for Tesla to create an electrified cage he dubs "the Gematria zone". The cage implements an anti-gravity system, allowing Tesla to float and strike Beelzebub faster.
36	9	"A Curse and a Prayer"; Transliteration: "Noroi to Inori" (Japanese: 呪いと祈り)	Unknown	Unknown	TBA	December 10, 2025
Tesla makes use of the Gematria zone's anti-gravity to move quickly around Beelzebub, providing the latter no time to defend; after which he lands a hit after seemingly teleporting to behind Beelzebub. After Tesla died on Earth, the U.S. government used his notes to conduct the Philadelphia Experiment, which teleported a battleship 300 miles away; although the files were destroyed due to several casualties. Beelzebub quickly deduces the limits of Tesla's teleportation abilities. After Lilith's death, Beelzebub fails to die by Hades, who suggests that Lilith's curse was a prayer for the former to keep living, and gifts him the Staff of Apomyius.
37	10	"The Torch Passed On"; Transliteration: "Tsunagu Omoi" (Japanese: 繋ぐ想い)	Unknown	Unknown	TBA	December 10, 2025
Beelzebub activates the forbidden technique Chaos that destroys the arena and severely injures Tesla and himself. In his youth, Tesla admired the ingenuity of his older brother Dane. After getting frustrated with the designs of a new windmill, Nikola inspires to keep trying. On a stormy night while checking the windmill, Dane is struck by lightning and dies. Six years later, a working windmill is refined and finished by Nikola, who had carried on Dane's work. Beelzebub unleashes an onslaught of sonic attacks that destroy the Gematria zone, though Tesla is ecstatic about the knowledge learned from his techniques, as he brings an onslaught of his punches.
38	11	"Progress"; Transliteration: "Zenshin" (Japanese: 前進)	Unknown	Unknown	TBA	December 10, 2025
After a barrage of punches against Beelzebub, Tesla realizes that the Chaos sphere did more damage than he thought. In a last-ditch effort, he severs his own arm and teleports it behind Beelzebub, continuing the force of the punch. Beelzebub sacrifices his left hand to strike a mortal wound to Tesla through his heart. Tesla encourages humanity to keep growing as he and Göndul die, with the gods winning the eight match and tying Ragnarök at four wins each. While Brunhilde mourns the fallen champions, Buddha asks about Ragnarök and her imprisoned ex Siegfried, for which she denies any connection.
39	12	"The Sun God and the Rebellious Hero"; Transliteration: "Taiyō Shin to Hankotsu no Eiyū" (Japanese: 太陽神と反骨の英雄)	Unknown	Unknown	TBA	December 10, 2025
The Greek gods visit their next chosen fighter: Sun God Apollo, while Brunhilde & Göll visit a waiting room filled with Spartans to recruit King Leonidas. Leonidas initially declines, but reconsiders after Brunhilde reveals Apollo as his opponent and performs a Volundr with the fifth Valkyrie sister Geirölul. Leonidas attacks before the match officially starts, with Apollo mocking him while dodging all of his swings. Leonidas reiterates his hatred of Apollo, as in 480 B.C., the Spartan Elder council forbade any military action defending Sparta against Xerxes and the Persians, due to a festival honoring Apollo and an oracle decree, despite protests from younger councilors.
40	13	"Pride vs. Pride"; Transliteration: "Hokori VS Iji" (Japanese: 誇りVS意地)	Unknown	Unknown	TBA	December 10, 2025
Leonidas destroys the Apollo statue and marches with 300 Spartans to face Xerxes in a losing effort at the Battle of Thermopylae. Leonidas reveals his shield, which changes into a chain & sawblade that knocks Apollo back. Apollo gracefully dodges the second strike using his divine treasure: the thread of Artemis, which he uses to create a pair of gauntlets that land several direct hits. After overhearing the crowd question his fighting tactics, Apollo shortens the arena boundaries to taunt Leonidas into facing him head-on. Apollo uses his threads to ensnare Leonidas and delivers a finishing blow, but Leonidas survives and headbutts Apollo before smashing him into a kneeling position.
41	14	"Know Thyself"; Transliteration: "Nanji Jishin wo Shire" (Japanese: 汝自身を知れ)	Unknown	Unknown	TBA	December 10, 2025
After being banished from Valhalla for his appearance, the monster Python terrorizes Delphi citizens. Apollo confronts Python and beats him down easily, with Python refusing to give up and unsuccessfully challenging Apollo day-after-day. Python explains the treatment he received because of his looks, but Apollo calls his fighting spirit beautiful. Python breaks down from Apollo's kind words and builds a temple dedicated to him. Apollo admires Leonidas' attacks and unravels the threads to summon a giant golden Artemis statue, that weaves a giant bow with arrows of light that shoot through all of Leonidas' body. Shocking everyone, Leonidas ricochets an arrow back, piercing Apollo's chest.
42	15	"A Clash of Souls"; Transliteration: "Gekitotsu Suru Tamashī" (Japanese: 激突する魂)	Unknown	Unknown	TBA	December 10, 2025
Zeus deduces that Leonidas' instincts allowed him to deflect the light arrow. Leonidas changes his divine treasure into a basic red shield, relying on Sparta's Phalanx maneuver. Apollo transforms his bow into human slingshot. Both charge towards one another, with Apollo smashing the shield and fatally striking Leonidas, who throws one last punch. Apollo consoles a dying Leonidas as the gods win round 9. Brunhilde panics on who to choose next, until Sōji Okita volunteers. Buddha confronts Odin about his theory that Brunhilde only started Ragnarök to seek revenge on Odin for Siegfried's imprisonment. Odin becomes frustrated and attacks Buddha, who is aided by Beelzebub, unnerving Odin with the mention of Primordial gods. The arena is built to resemble 19th century Kyoto, where the tenth round begins between Okita and the Shinto god Susanoo-no-Mikoto.
