= Sundiata =

Sundiata may refer to:

- Sundiata Keita (c. 1217–1255), the king of the Mandinka people and founder of the Mali Empire, subject of the epic poem known as "Sundiata" or "Son Jara"
  - Epic of Sundiata, his story
- Sundiata Acoli (born 1939), African-American prisoner
- Sundiata Anderson (born 2000), American football player
- Sekou Sundiata (1948–2007), African-American poet and performer
- Daniel Sunjata (born 1971), American actor
- Sundiata Gaines (born 1986), American basketball player
- Ibrahim K. Sundiata, American historian
- Sundiata (album), a 1995 album by jazz saxophonist Chris Potter
