= Floater discography =

- Studio albums: 9
- Live albums: 4
- Compilation albums: 8
- Radio edits: 2
- Demos: 2
- Interactive media: 1

Floater is an American rock trio from Eugene, Oregon. The band's discography consists of eight studio albums, four live albums, eight compilation albums, two promotional CDs, two radio edits, two demo tapes, and one interactive media compact disc.

== Studio albums ==
- Sink (1994, CD & Cassette)
- Glyph (1995)
- Angels in the Flesh and Devils in the Bone (1998)
- Burning Sosobra (2000, digipak & jewel case versions)
- Alter (2002)
- Acoustics (2004)
- Stone by Stone (2006)
- Wake (2010, digipak)
- The Thief (2018)

== Live albums ==
- The Great Release (1999)
- Live at the Aladdin (2001)
- Floater Lives (2004 digipak)
- Acoustic Live at the WOW (2008 digipak)

== Other releases ==
- Stiff & Restless (Demo tape) (1994, 4 song demo tape)
- Sink (Demo tape) (1994, 9 song demo tape)
- Northwest Post-Grunge (1994, compilation disc - track "Godgun [post edit]")
- Hits Rock - New Sckoool, Volume I (1995 promotional CD - track "Kill the Girl")
- Danny Boy plus three (1996, three radio edits plus "Alcoholic" outtake)
- NAIL Fall/Winter 95/96 (1995, promotional CD - track "Thin Skin")
- Subject to Change (1996, compilation - track an early version of "America Theatric")
- Angels in the Flesh... Radio Edits (1998, radio edits)
- Launch CD no. 46 (2000, strictly an interactive media CD)
- Northwestern Presents... Rock Stars Attack! (2000, compilation, additionally an interactive media CD - track "[Marriage of the] Black Sheep")
- Eclectic Eugene - Eugene Weekly Celebrates 21 Years of Culture and Truth (2003 2-disc compilation - track "Rocking Horse")
- Promo Only: Modern Rock Radio - February 2008 (2008, promotional CD - track "An Apology")
- Burgerville presents: Rise & Shine (2012 2-disc compilation - track "Wondering")
