= Griff =

Griff may refer to:

== People ==
- Griff (name), a list of people with the given name or surname
- Griff (singer), stage name of English singer and songwriter Sarah Faith Griffiths (born 2001)
- Nickname of Guy Griffiths (1915–1999), British Second World War Royal Marine pilot and prisoner of war
- Professor Griff, stage name of American rapper Richard Griffin (born 1969)
- Emyr Morus Griffith (1923–1995), half of the Miki & Griff British country music duo
- Griff Rhys Jones, Welsh comedian, writer, actor and television presenter

== Fictional characters ==
- Griff Tannen, in the 1989 film Back to the Future Part II
- Griff, in the 2017 film Baby Driver
- Griff (Rave Master), in the Japanese manga and anime series Rave Master
- Griff, in the television series Married... with Children
- Griff, Gargoyles clan member in the Disney animated series Gargoyles
- Griff Reynolds, in British soap opera Coronation Street
- Griff, grifter epic brawler from mobile game Brawl Stars

== Places ==
- Griff, Warwickshire, England, a hamlet
- Griff Creek, California, United States

== Other uses ==
- Griff (TV series), an American television series (1973–1974) starring Lorne Greene
- Nuneaton Griff F.C., a football club based in Nuneaton, Warwickshire, England
- Griff., the botanical author abbreviation for William Griffith (botanist) (1810–1845), British botanist

== See also ==
- Griff's Hamburgers, an American regional fast food chain founded in 1960 by Griff's of America, Inc.
- Grif (disambiguation)
- Griffin (disambiguation)
- Groff (disambiguation)
- McGriff, a list of people with the surname
