= Concentration (disambiguation) =

Concentration, in chemistry, is the measure of how much of a given substance there is mixed with another substance.

Concentration may also refer to:

== Science, engineering, and technology ==
- Mass concentration (astronomy), a region of a planet or moon's crust that is denser than average
- Number density in physics, chemistry, and astronomy

== Entertainment ==
- Concentration (card game), the card game
- Concentration (game show), American television game show
- Concentration (album), an album by Machines of Loving Grace
- Concentration 20, an album by Namie Amuro

== Economics ==
- Market concentration, in economics, the number and production share of firms in a market (or industry)
- Concentration ratio, in economics, a measure of market concentration.

== Other uses ==
- Attentional control, the cognitive process of controlling the focus of attention
- Samadhi (Buddhism), mental concentration in Buddhism
- Concentration camp, a detention center created for specific groups of people, usually during wartime
- Concentration or academic concentration, a term used at some colleges and universities to refer to a type of academic major or specific focus within a major
- Force concentration, and concentrate, in military tactics, the practice of concentrating military units

== See also ==
- Concentrate (disambiguation)
