= Grif =

Grif may refer to:

- Dexter Grif, a character in Red vs. Blue
  - Grifball a Halo gametype named after the character
- Grif Italia, an Italian hang glider manufacturer
- o-aminophenol oxidase, an enzyme referred to as GriF
- Grif Teller (1899–1993), artist famous for his paintings for the Pennsylvania Railroad

== See also ==
- Griff (disambiguation)
- Gryph (disambiguation)
- Gryf
- Gryffe
