= List of Fairy Tail: 100 Years Quest chapters =

Cover of the first volume of Fairy Tail: 100 Years Quest as published by Kodansha on November 9, 2018

Fairy Tail: 100 Years Quest is a Japanese manga series written and storyboarded by Hiro Mashima, and illustrated by Atsuo Ueda. It is a sequel to Mashima's Fairy Tail manga series, focusing on Natsu Dragneel and his team from the titular wizard guild as they aim to complete an unfinished, century-old mission. It began serialization on Kodansha's Magazine Pocket manga app on July 25, 2018. The chapters have been collected in tankōbon volumes since November 2018, with twenty-four volumes released as of August 2026. The manga has also inspired a television anime adaptation.

The manga was published for an English language release by Kodansha USA in August 2019, with its chapters simultaneously published on Kodansha's K Manga service.

== Volumes ==
No.	Original release date	Original ISBN	English release date	English ISBN
1	November 9, 2018	978-4-06-513398-9	August 20, 2019	978-1-63236-892-8
1. "The First Guild and the Strongest Guild" ("最初"のギルドと"最強"のギルド, "Saisho" no Girudo to "Saikyō" no Girudo); 2. "The Dragon Slayers' Lineage" (滅竜の系譜, Metsuryū no Keifu); 3. "The Last Hope" (最後の希望, Saigo no Kibō); 4. "Amazing Ermina" (アメイジング・エルミナ, Ameijingu Erumina); 5. "The Sealing of the Five Dragon Gods" (五神竜を"封"じろ, Goshinryū o "Fū"jiro); 6. "The Slaying Blade" (滅する刃, Messuru Yaiba); 7. "The Sea of Dragons" (竜の海, Ryū no Umi); 8. "A Dragon God's Melancholy" (神竜の憂鬱, Shinryū no Yūutsu); 9. "Black or White?" (黒か白か, Kuro ka Shiro ka)
Natsu Dragneel's team embarks on the 100 Years Quest issued by the Magia Dragon guild on the northern continent of Guiltina. The guild's master, a formerly human Dragon Slayer named Elefseria, instructs the team to subdue the Five Dragon Gods, a group of dragons who are each rumored to rival Acnologia in power. The team travels to the city of Ermina in search of Mercphobia, the Water Dragon God, who is also being hunted by a trio of Dragon Eaters from the guild Diabolos – Kiria, Madmole, and Skullion Raider – who intend to steal Mercphobia's magic by devouring him. Mercphobia appears in a humanoid form and interrupts the guilds' fighting, revealing that a century-old witch called the White Wizard has already stolen much of his power, which he requests Natsu's team to recover before he loses control of his remaining magic. Meanwhile, Fairy Tail recruits a new member named Touka, whom Jellal Fernandes suspects is the White Wizard.
2	March 8, 2019	978-4-06-514119-9	November 19, 2019	978-1-63236-893-5
10. "Diabolos of the Cutting Heart" (斬心の悪魔(ディアボロス), Zanshin no Diaborosu); 11. "Blade, Armor, Ash" (刃､ 鎧､ 灰, Yaiba, Yoroi, Hai); 12. "Stars and Lightning" (星と雷, Hoshi to Ikazuchi); 13. "A Maritime Meeting" (水の巡り合わせ, Mizu no Meguriawase); 14. "Rain and Shadow" (雨と陰, Ame to Kage); 15. "Dyed White" (白く染まる, Shiroku Somaru); 16. "Ash and Dark Clouds" (灰と暗雲, Hai to An'un); 17. "The Holy Water Dragon" (水神竜, Suijinryū); 18. "A Bitter Choice" (苦渋の決断, Kujū no Ketsudan)
The Diabolos trio decide to target the White Wizard for Mercphobia's power, capturing Natsu's team and injuring Mercphobia. Lucy Heartfilia, Happy and Carla escape and encounter Brandish μ, who, like Lucy, is searching Guiltina for Aquarius's key. With Brandish's help, Fairy Tail forces Diabolos into retreat. Shortly afterward, Mercphobia loses self-control and transforms into a dragon, mindlessly attacking Ermina and overwhelming Natsu's team. Meanwhile, Jellal accuses Touka of being the White Wizard, but Laxus Dreyar defends her. When Fairy Tail begins to question Touka's background, the White Wizard reveals herself to be possessing Touka and attacks Jellal for his interference, only to be suppressed by Touka, who is captured by Gajeel Redfox. During an interrogation, Touka reveals that she joined Fairy Tail to seek Wendy Marvell's help in separating the White Wizard from her. However, the White Wizard takes over again and steals Fairy Tail and Jellal's magic.
3	July 9, 2019	978-4-06-515724-4	February 18, 2020	978-1-63236-947-5
19. "From the Depths" (深淵より, Shin'en yori); 20. "Lineage of Fire" (炎の系譜, Honō no Keifu); 21. "Burn It All" (全てを燃やす, Subete o Moyasu); 22. "Team Effort" (みんながいなきゃ, Minna ga Inakya); 23. "The Blessed Harbor Town" (祝福の港町, Shukufuku no Minatomachi); 24. "All's Well That Ends Well" (結果オーライ, Kekka Ōrai); 25. "Fairy Nail"; 26. "At Rainhill" (レインヒルにて, Reinhiru ni te); 27. "Aldoron, Wood Dragon God" (木神竜アルドロン, Mokushinryū Arudoron)
Natsu is rescued from Mercphobia by Ignia, the Fire Dragon God and Igneel's biological son. Intending to strengthen Natsu for a future confrontation, Ignia spreads his flames and coaxes Natsu into eating them before flying away. The flames imbue Natsu with enough power to defeat Mercphobia, but also nearly send Natsu on a rampage until Lucy calms him down. Mercphobia regains his sanity and is rendered powerless, which meets the requirements for Fairy Tail's mission. Out of gratitude, Mercphobia directs Fairy Tail to the city of Drasil to find Aldoron, the Wood Dragon God. En route, they visit a guild of Fairy Tail doppelgängers called Fairy Nail, with Juvia Lockser's doppelgänger encouraging Gray Fullbuster to be more forward in his love for Juvia. Upon reaching Drasil, the team reunites with Juvia, who has escaped from the White Wizard and warns them about her shortly before they discover the town to be built atop the gargantuan Aldoron's right hand.
4	November 8, 2019	978-4-06-517305-3	May 26, 2020 (digital); August 11, 2020 (print)	978-1-63236-948-2
28. "White Ascendent" (白の支配, Shiro no Shihai); 29. "Whiteout" (白滅(ホワイトアウト), Howaitoauto); 30. "Fun with Fighting" (ケンカ祭り, Kenka Matsuri); 31. "Fairy Face-Off" (対峙する妖精たち, Taiji suru Yōsei-tachi); 32. "Star Dress Mix" (星霊衣合成(スタードレスミックス), Sutā Doresu Mikkusu); 33. "Pain" (痛み, Itami); 34. "New Foes" (新たなる刺客たち, Arata naru Shikaku-tachi); 35. "Reiss, the Spirit Dragon" (Note: "Reiss" is an alternative spelling of "Wraith" used in Volume 4's English translation.) (霊龍のレイス, Reiryū no Reisu); 36. "Rumble in Drasil" (混戦のドラシール, Konsen no Dorashīru)
While exploring Drasil, Natsu's team encounters their guildmates and Jellal, who have been brainwashed by the White Wizard. Seeking to control Aldoron, the White Wizard sends the brainwashed wizards across the sleeping dragon's body to destroy five orbs that maintain his power, destroying the orb on Aldoron's right hand; Juvia, whom Touka has freed from the White Wizard's control, warns her friends of the plan. Natsu's team splits up to protect the remaining orbs, defeating several of their friends to have Wendy return them to normal. On Aldoron's right shoulder, Wendy finds several Fairy Tail members already incapacitated by Nebaru, a Dragon Eater from Diabolos, whose members are also in Drasil to destroy the orbs so they may eat Aldoron for themselves. Kiria interjects during a confrontation between Erza Scarlet, Jellal, and Laxus on Aldoron's left hand, while another Dragon Eater, a spirit named Wraith, defeats Natsu and steals his soul.
5	March 9, 2020	978-4-06-518450-9	October 27, 2020	978-1-63236-984-0
37. "Beta Heaven" (β天国(ベータヘヴン), Bēta Hevun); 38. "Synchro Rate" (シンクロ率, Shinkuro-ritsu); 39. "Coo-Coo, the Cocoon Dragon" (繭竜マユマユ, Mayuryū Mayumayu); 40. "Thicker Than Blood" (血よりも濃い, Chi yori mo Koi); 41. "A Card in the Hand" (反撃の切り札, Hangeki no Kirifuda); 42. "For the Guild, I Would" (ギルドの為なら, Girudo no Tame nara); 43. "Mistakes & Misapprehensions" (勘違い, Kanchigai); 44. "Scarlet Showdown" (紅の激闘, Kurenai no Gekitō); 45. "Crimson Conclusion" (紅の決着, Kurenai no Ketchaku)
Natsu has a near-death experience in which he reunites with the deceased Zeref Dragneel, Mavis Vermillion, their sons August and Larcade Dragneel, and Igneel. Receiving their guidance, Natsu turns his soul into a thought projection to battle the incorporeal Wraith. Wraith possesses Makarov Dreyar to overpower Natsu, but surrenders and ascends to the afterlife upon regaining his lost memories as Makarov's friend from Fairy Tail. When Nebaru destroys the orb on Aldoron's right shoulder, Natsu and Happy fly towards the orb on the dragon's backside and meet Touka, who reveals herself to be an Exceed possessed by the human White Wizard, before the White Wizard takes control again. Meanwhile, Lucy recruits Cana Alberona – whom she discovers is drunk rather than brainwashed – to seal their defeated friends within her cards, while Erza captures Jellal and duels Laxus to a draw, which allows Kiria to destroy the orb on Aldoron's left hand.
6	June 9, 2020	978-4-06-519429-4	December 15, 2020	978-1-64651-039-9
46. "White Will" (白の意志, Shiro no Ishi); 47. "Clinging Dragon Berserk" (暴虐の粘竜, Bōgyaku no Nenryū); 48. "Fifth-Generation Dragon Force" (第五世代ドラゴンフォース, Dai-go Sedai Doragon Fōsu); 49. "The Final Orb" (最後のオーブ, Saigo no Ōbu); 50. "The Secret of the Wood Dragon God" (木神竜の秘密, Mokushinryū no Himitsu); 51. "The Howling Earth" (轟く大地, Todoroku Daichi); 52. "Telepathic Trees" (読心の木々, Dokushin no Kigi); 53. "The Most Precious Curse" (尊き呪い, Tōtoki Noroi); 54. "God Seeds" (ゴッドシード, Goddo Shīdo)
Happy helps Natsu escape from the White Wizard by immobilizing her with one of the orbs, which he realizes she cannot touch. Nebaru ignores his orders to retreat and activates his Dragon Force, which rapidly transforms him into a dragon. Enchanting herself with Irene Belserion's residual power to fight back, Wendy unwittingly awakens a mental copy of Irene herself, who returns Nebaru to normal by separating his magic power from him. Mest Gryder destroys the remaining orbs, but instead of losing power, Aldoron absorbs the willing townsfolk into his body and awakens at full strength. The White Wizard – who realizes that Selene, the Moon Dragon God, has deceived her about the orbs – loses control over the wizards, allowing Wendy to separate her from Touka. To eliminate the wizards, Aldoron sprouts a God Seed legion named Wolfen that transforms into powerful figures from people's memories. When Natsu tricks one Wolfen into transforming into Zeref to kill Aldoron with Zeref's curse, the legion is replaced with three other God Seeds – Metro, Gears, and Doom – while Natsu is confronted by the God Seed embodiment of Aldoron himself.
7	October 9, 2020	978-4-06-521026-0	May 18, 2021	978-1-64651-152-5
55. "A Destiny of Death" (死の運命, Shi no Unmei); 56. "Friends You Can Count On" (頼れる仲間たち, Tayoreru Nakama-tachi); 57. "Strength to Live" (生きる力, Ikiru Chikara); 58. "Ice and Water" (氷と水, Kōri to Mizu); 59. "The Gears of Fate" (運命の歯車, Unmei no Haguruma); 60. "Gigantify" (巨大化, Kyodaika); 61. "Forest of Swords" (剣戟森森, Kengeki Shinshin); 62. "Burning Will" (燃ゆる意志, Moyuru Ishi); 63. "Celebration in Dramil" (ドラミールの宴, Doramīru no Utage)
Aldoron is gradually weakened as the other God Seeds are destroyed by the wizards: several of Fairy Tail's lesser members defeat Doom after receiving enchantments from Wendy, saving her and Carla from Doom's life-draining spores; Metro's attempt to absorb Juvia's watery form backfires when Gray confesses his feelings to her and magically turns her into ice, which he uses to defeat Metro; and Jellal overcomes Gears' power of mental blockage with the help of Ultear Milkovich's phantom, allowing him to accept his own feelings for Erza. Meanwhile, the visiting Brandish briefly turns Gajeel into a giant large enough to battle Aldoron's dragon form, further weakening him. Eventually, Natsu gains an advantage over Aldoron's inflammable body and destroys his avatar, which kills Aldoron. Over the next three days, Natsu's team celebrates their reunion with their friends in the neighboring city of Dramil while waiting for Touka and the White Wizard to recover from their separation.
8	February 9, 2021	978-4-06-522350-5	September 28, 2021	978-1-64651-233-1
64. "Aldo-no-Yu" (亜留土乃湯, Arudo no Yu); 65. "Elentear" (エレンティア, Erentia); 66. "In Edolas" (エドラスにて, Edorasu ni te); 67. "Aqua Aera" (水の翼(アクアエーラ), Akua Ēra); 68. "Selene, the Moon Dragon God" (月神竜セレーネ, Gesshinryū Serēne); 69. "The Hand" (手, Te); 70. "Spiria" (スピリア, Supiria); 71. "The Spirit Arts" (霊術, Reijutsu); 72. "The Moonlight Divinities" (月下美神, Gekka Bijin)
Touka and the White Wizard are revealed to be denizens of Elentear, a parallel world that suffers from an overabundance of magic. The White Wizard casts Touka's teleportation magic on Natsu's team to bring them to Elentear, but accidentally sends them and herself to Edolas instead. While trapped without the use of their magic, the group reunites with their acquaintances and counterparts from Edolas – meeting the children that Natsu and Gray's counterparts have had with Lucy and Juvia's counterparts, respectively – before Touka receives a spare X-Ball from Mystogan that restores her magic. Humbled by her mistakes, the White Wizard identifies herself as an imposter named Faris, a guardian shrine maiden of Elentear whom Selene forced into hunting the Five Dragon Gods under the threat of Elentear's destruction. Selene suddenly appears and sends the group to Elentear, where they are separated by a giant hand from under the world's surface. Despite their magic's enhancement in this world, Natsu's team is defeated by Selene's minions, the Moonlight Divinities.
9	July 9, 2021	978-4-06-524017-5	December 21, 2021	978-1-64651-306-2
73. "Moonlit Banquet" (月夜の宴, Tsukiyo no Utage); 74. "Nuré-Onna" (妖怪"濡れ女", Yōkai "Nure Onna"); 75. "Memories of Water" (水の記憶, Mizu no Kioku); 76. "Dance of the Twin Tigers" (双虎の陣, Sōko no Jin); 77. "Whiteout Village" (白滅の里, Hakumetsu no Sato); 78. "The Demons' Parade" (百鬼夜行, Hyakki Yakō); 79. "The Inhuman Path: Ohmagatoki" (外法・逢魔時, Gehō: Ōmagatoki); 80. "Suzaku" (スザク); 81. "Sword Saint" (剣聖, Kensei)
Holding Natsu and Gray captive for her own entertainment, Selene sends them to the caves of her mountain lair to battle a horde of yōkai, including their own teammates transformed by Yoko, one of the Moonlight Divinities. Aquarius summons herself through Lucy's enhanced magic, restores Lucy's memories, and tricks Wendy into undoing her own transformation, allowing Wendy to do the same for the rest of the transformed wizards. Selene dispatches Yoko to battle the team with her infinite yōkai, but Erza defeats Yoko and dispels the horde. Meanwhile, the chief shrine maiden of Faris's village magically summons Suzaku, one of Diabolos's elite Dark Dragon Slayer Knights, to kill Selene. Suzaku encounters Fairy Tail as they escape Selene's mountain and attacks them to avenge his guild, injuring Natsu and Erza. Selene appears before the wizards and duels Suzaku, while the other two Moonlight Divinities, Hakune and Mimi, pursue Fairy Tail to Faris's village.
10	November 9, 2021	978-4-06-525984-9	July 12, 2022	978-1-64651-422-9
82. "Rematch" (リベンジマッチ, Ribenji Matchi); 83. "Mimi the Immovable" (不動のミミ, Fudō no Mimi); 84. "Frozen Fantasy" (凍てつく夢幻, Itetsuku no Mugen); 85. "Ice Giants" (氷の巨人, Kōri no Kyojin); 86. "Abyss" (深淵, Shin'en); 87. "This Hideous World" (醜き世界, Minikuki Sekai); 88. "Alta Face" (アルタ・フェイス, Aruta Feisu); 89. "An Elentear Evening" (エレンティアの宵, Erentia no Yoi); 90. "Homecoming" (帰還, Kikan)
Lucy and Gray defeat Mimi and Hakune, respectively, while Suzaku injures Selene with magic gained from her son Kurunugi, a dragon slain by Diabolos's master, Georg Reizen. Natsu and Erza recover, but fail to stop Selene from fleeing Elentear with Suzaku in pursuit. Elentear becomes overrun with the giant hands of Alta Face, an underground monster provoked by Selene into causing the world's magic crisis. Natsu's team destroys Alta Face, allowing Faris and her fellow shrine maidens to vanquish its hands. With Elentear saved, the wizards forgive Faris and return to Earthland. Meanwhile, Suzaku brings a captive Selene to Georg, whom she effortlessly kills after breaking free, having feigned defeat to avenge Kurunugi's death.
11	March 9, 2022	978-4-06-527265-7	November 8, 2022	978-1-64651-573-8
91. "My World" (私の世界, Watashi no Sekai); 92. "The Great Labyrinth" (大迷宮, Daimeikyū); 93. "The Sixth of the Five Dragon Gods" (六頭目の五神竜, Roku-tōme no Goshinryū); 94. "Battle Dungeon" (バトルダンジョン, Batoru Danjon); 95. "Plush Doll" (プラッシュドール, Purasshu Dōru); 96. "Lightning and Air" (雷と大気, Ikazuchi to Taiki); 97. "Haku, the White-Tiger Dragon" (白虎竜のハク, Byakkoryū no Haku); 98. "Enchantment Magic" (付加(エンチャント)魔法, Enchanto Mahō) (Note: Originally titled "Enchant" (付加魔法(エンチャント), Enchanto) on Magazine Pocket.); 99. "Scarlet Rage" (緋色の怒り, Hiiro no Ikari)
Selene becomes Diabolos's new master to enlist Suzaku and his fellow Dark Dragon Slayer Knights – Kirin, Haku, and Misaki – in slaying the other surviving Dragon Gods. To accomplish this, she sends them to retrieve Elefseria's disembodied second heart from the Great Labyrinth of Dogra, a dungeon made from the remains of Dogramag, a sixth Dragon God slain by Elefseria. With Natsu's team visiting Elefseria for further information on their quest, Selene pits them, Gajeel, and Laxus against Diabolos's strongest members in a contest to find the heart. Wendy and Laxus duel Haku and Kirin, respectively, with Irene assisting Wendy in defeating Haku; meanwhile, Natsu, Erza, and Lucy are faced with Suzaku, Misaki, and Kiria after being separated.
12	July 8, 2022	978-4-06-528381-3	April 11, 2023	978-1-64651-693-3
100. "An Uninvited Guest" (招かざる客, Manekazaru Kyaku); 101. "Quintessence of Fire" (炎の神髄, Honō no Shinzui); 102. "Woman vs. Woman" (女と女の戦い, Onna to Onna no Tatakai); 103. "Friends Remembered" (仲間の記憶, Nakama no Kioku); 104. "Blue Dimension" (青き次元(ブルーディメンション), Burū Dimenshon); 105. "The Color Scarlet" (緋色, Hiiro); 106. "Fire & Moon" (炎と月, Honō to Tsuki); 107. "Dragon vs. Dragon" (双竜激突, Sōryū Gekitotsu); 108. "The Earth Awakes" (大地の目覚め, Daichi no Mezame)
While Lucy and Erza defeat Kiria and Misaki, respectively, Natsu and Suzaku's battle is interrupted by the arrival of Ignia, who is searching for Elefseria's heart. Forming a truce against Ignia, Natsu and Suzaku follow him to the base of the labyrinth, where they witness him destroying the heart and gravely injuring Selene in a duel. The heart's destruction revives Dogramag, who had stored his own life force within the heart to fake his own death as part of an unknown plan with Ignia. Before leaving, Ignia permits Dogramag to kill everyone in the labyrinth except for Natsu, whom Dogramag challenges to battle.
13	November 9, 2022	978-4-06-529716-2	July 18, 2023	978-1-64651-890-6
109. "A King's Soul" (王の魂, Ō no Tamashii); 110. "The Voice of a Grudge" (呪怨の声, Juon no Koe); 111. "The Howl of the Earth" (大地の叫び, Daichi no Sakebi); 112. "A Quiet Wish" (静かな願い, Shizukana Negai); 113. "The Alchemists' Guild" (錬金術士ギルド, Renkinjutsushi Girudo); 114. "A Guild's Bonds" (ギルドの繋がり, Girudo no Tsunagari); 115. "The Man the Dragon Deity Loved" (竜の神に愛された男, Ryū no Kami ni Aisareta Otoko); 116. "Iron's Revenge" (鉄のリベンジ, Tetsu no Ribenji); 117. "Sword of Flame" (炎の刃, Honō no Yaiba)
Laxus has a rematch with Kirin, learning that his lacrima implant is the crystallized heart of the dragon whose soul is contained within Kirin's coffin. Hindered by the lacrima's resonance with the soul, Laxus removes his implant to defeat Kirin. Meanwhile, Selene persuades Fairy Tail to help her defeat Dogramag by destroying magical cores scattered across the labyrinth, which make him impervious to Natsu and Suzaku's attacks. Gray and Gajeel prevent two of the cores from being stolen by Sai and a seemingly resurrected God Serena from the alchemist guild Gold Owl. After the cores are destroyed, Natsu performs a Unison Raid with Suzaku that kills Dogramag.
14	April 7, 2023	978-4-06-531285-8	October 10, 2023	978-1-64651-891-3
118. "The Collapsing Maze" (崩壊する迷宮, Hōkai suru Meikyū); 119. "Naked Bonding" (裸の付き合い, Hadaka no Tsukiai); 120. "A Guild's History" (ギルドの歴史, Girudo no Rekishi); 121. "Their Wishes" (二人の願い, Futari no Negai); 122. "Apology" (謝罪, Shazai); 123. "Back Home" (ただいま, Tadaima); 124. "Five Challenges" (五本勝負, Gohon Shōbu); 125. "The Saber Archive" (セイバー大書院, Seibā Daishoin); 126. "Firan Town" (フィランの街, Firan no Machi)
Fairy Tail and Diabolos escape from the labyrinth's collapse caused by Dogramag's death. Both guilds make peace with each other, as does Elefseria with Selene, who reveals herself to be mortally wounded from her battle with Ignia. Irene saves her by enchanting Selene's wound onto herself; with Selene's help, Irene reincarnates in Edolas as Mystogan and Erza Knightwalker's newborn daughter. Before Natsu's team returns to Magnolia, Elefseria and Selene reveal the existence of Athena, a weapon created by Elefseria's pupil, which is capable of killing Ignia and the other remaining Dragon God, Viernes. Back on Ishgal, Natsu's team and Jellal learn from Saber Tooth member Sorano Agria that Athena is the mechanical White Wizard whom Faris impersonated, as well as a member of Gold Owl. Joined by Jellal and members of Saber Tooth, Natsu's team travels to the city of Firan on Guiltina, where Natsu's friends are captured by locals under Gold Owl's orders.
15	August 8, 2023	978-4-06-532600-8	April 16, 2024	979-8-88877-035-1
127. "The Laws of the Miners' Guild" (炭鉱夫ギルドの掟, Tankōfu Girudo no Okite); 128. "Where Tigers Band Together" (共闘の虎, Kyōtō no Tora); 129. "Gennai and Koutetsu" (ゲンナイとコウテツ, Gennai to Kōtetsu); 130. "Alchemical Smoke" (錬金の煙, Renkin no Kemuri); 131. "The Signario Sisters" (シグナリオ姉妹, Shigunario Shimai); 132. "Dream Death World" (ドリームデスワールド, Dorīmu Desu Wārudo); 133. "God Worthless" (ゴッド残念, Goddo Zannen); 134. "Feelings Transmuted" (感情の錬成, Kanjō no Rensei); 135. "Tedious" (うんざり, Unzari)
Natsu teams with Saber Tooth to rescue his friends. Gray, Wendy, and Rogue Cheney meet Gold Owl's master and Athena's creator, Duke Barbaroa, who explains that he requires Dragon Slayer magic to perfect Athena, stealing Wendy and Rogue's magic for this purpose. Minerva rescues Erza and Jellal, evading Gold Owl's powerful Signario Sisters, Luso and Ennie, in the process. Athena steals Natsu and Sting Eucliffe's magic when they and Yukino Agria rescue Lucy and Happy, revealing her desire for human emotion through Dragon Slayer magic. Lucy helps Athena realize that her ability to feel already exists, convincing her to return the stolen magic and negotiate with Duke over a truce with Fairy Tail. However, Duke deems Athena to be a failure and disposes of her.
16	December 7, 2023	978-4-06-533891-9	September 10, 2024	979-8-88877-036-8
136. "God Trouble" (ゴッド迷惑, Goddo Meiwaku); 137. "Athena's Past" (アテナの過去, Atena no Kako); 138. "The Plan to Stop Viernes" (ビエルネス攻略作戦開始, Bierunesu Kōryaku Sakusen Kaishi); 139. "The Menace of Gold Owl" (黄金の梟(ゴールドオウル)の脅威, Gōrudo Ōru no Kyōi); 140. "Rival Bond Transmutation" (敵絆(ライバルボンド)錬成, Raibaru Bondo Rensei); 141. "Opposite Battle" (あべこべバトル, Abekobe Batoru); 142. "Their Respective Objectives" (それぞれの目的, Sorezore no Mokuteki); 143. "God-Battle" (ゴッドバトル, Goddo Batoru); 144. "Beyond the Guilt" (罪の先へ, Tsumi no Saki e)
Elefseria transports the wizards and Athena to safety at the Magia Dragon guildhall. Athena recovers and reveals Gold Owl to be a product of Viernes's disembodied will, with the current Duke being a figment modeled after the real, deceased Duke. She further explains that to defeat Viernes, they must separate his will from Gold Owl and use the mythical philosopher's stone to restore his physical form. Natsu's team, Jellal, and Athena return to Gold Owl to recover Wendy's magic, but are lured into a battle against Gold Owl's members, including Athena II, an emotionless version of Athena imbued with Wendy and Rogue's power. During the fight, Jellal destroys the fake God Serena and commits to absolving himself by joining Fairy Tail. Meanwhile, Saber Tooth searches for an alchemist capable of creating the philosopher's stone, eventually meeting an old man named Zalam, who directs them to a genius alchemist named Iruha.
17	April 9, 2024	978-4-06-535160-4	March 25, 2025	979-8-88877-376-5
145. "vs. A World" (vs.世界, vs. Sekai); 146. "A Hope for Peace" (平和への想い, Heiwa e no Omoi); 147. "Iruha" (イルハ); 148. "Bonds of Lightning" (雷の絆, Ikazuchi no Kizuna); 149. "Partings and Chance Meetinngs" (別れと邂逅, Wakare to Kaikō); 150. "The Metal Dragon God Viernes" (金神竜ビエルネス, Kinjinryū Bierunesu); 151. "Bearing Their Hopes" (思いを背負って, Omoi o Seotte); 152. "A Final Hope Entrusted" (託されたもう一つの思い, Takusareta Mō Hitotsu no Omoi); 153. "Love's Miracle" (愛の奇跡, Ai no Kiseki)
Fairy Tail defeats the fake Duke, Athena II and the Signario Sisters, returning all of the stolen Dragon Slayer magic. Saber Tooth acquires the philosopher's stone from Zalam and Iruha, unaware that they are the same person and the real, still living Duke. Using the stone, Athena sacrifices herself as material to restore Viernes, whom Natsu destroys after Wendy imbues him with his friends' magic. Gold Owl vanishes, its members having been figments created by Viernes; the only survivors are the Signario Sisters, who regain their memories as members of Fire & Flame, a group that serves Ignia. Athena also survives after her mind miraculously enters Athena II's body. With Ignia as the last Dragon God remaining, Fairy Tail parts with Saber Tooth to search for his lair, the Fire God's Castle.
18	August 7, 2024	978-4-06-536506-9; 978-4-06-536674-5 (SE)	August 5, 2025	979-8-88877-440-3
154. "The Cobra" (ザ・コブラ, Za Kobura); 155. "Ichiya's Woes" (一夜の悩み, Ichiya no Nayami); 156. "Brian" (ブライアン, Buraian); 157. "Fire & Flame" (ファイア&フレイム, Faia & Fureimu); 158. "Fire Dance" (火炎演武, Kaen Enbu); 159. "A Mad Feast of Illusory Flames" (炎幻の狂宴, Engen no Kyōen); 160. "Cats Are Wizards, Too!" (ネコだって魔導士, Neko datte Madōshi); 161. "A Blazing Reunion" (炎の再会, Honō no Saikai); 162. "A Dark Meeting" (黒きの出会い, Kuroki no Deai) (Note: Originally titled "Reunion...? (再会...?, Saikai...?) on Magazine Pocket.)
Jellal leaves for Ishgal after telling Erza his intention to join Fairy Tail. At a saloon, Natsu's team encounters Brian, a fire-eating member of Fire & Flame, which the team learns is a dark guild of fire wizards led by Ignia. Upon realizing Natsu's identity, Brian captures him with the assistance of his guildmates, illusionist Lage and Fire Make wizard Rekka. Meanwhile, Erza is challenged by Fire & Flame's second-in-command, the masked flame swordsman Wed, while Lage traps the rest of Natsu's team in illusory worlds populated by manga characters Nakajima, Griff, and Hien, though they escape and defeat Lage after Happy and Carla break the illusions. Brian brings Natsu to the Fire God's Castle to meet Ignia, who reveals his plan to start a "true" Dragon King Festival; he invites Natsu to join Fire & Flame, but is rejected. Their confrontation is interrupted by the arrival of a dark-skinned Faris, who introduces herself as the Black Wizard and declares her own participation in Ignia's festival.
19	December 9, 2024	978-4-06-537768-0	November 4, 2025	979-8-88877-573-8
163. "Black Will" (黒き意志, Kuroki Ishi); 164. "A Three-Way Standoff for the Fate of the World" (世界をかけた三つ巴, Sekai o Kaketa Mitsudomoe); 165. "Five Fairies" (五人の妖精, Go-nin no Yōsei); 166. "The Bond of the Key" (鍵の絆, Kagi no Kizuna); 167. "Friends Wait in the Raging Sea" (荒ぶる海に友は待つ, Araburu Umi ni Tomo wa Matsu); 168. "A Great Power Pierces Through Stone" (大いなる力は石を穿つ, Ōinaru Chikara wa Ishi o Ugatsu); 169. "The Bonds of Water" (水の繋がり, Mizu no Tsunagari); 170. "The Name Manifests the Form" (名は体を表す, Na wa Tai o Arawasu); 171. "Six Black Powers" (六つの黒き力, Muttsu no Kuroki Chikara)
The Black Wizard Faris reveals herself to be the Earthland counterpart of Elentear's Faris, imbued with Acnologia's dismembered left arm and powers. Ignia initiates his plan: using roots created by Dogramag, he produces lacrima crystals in his fellow Dragon Gods' lands that revive Aldoron and Viernes, drive the four dragons berserk, and turn Guiltina's citizens, including Fire & Flame, into humanoid dragons. Elefseria gathers Natsu's team to his guild, where they disperse to destroy the lacrima. In Ermina, Brandish aids Lucy in destroying Mercphobia's lacrima, which contains Aquarius' key; Brandish allows Lucy to keep the key, reuniting her with Aquarius. At the Fire God's Castle, Natsu defeats Brian while Happy convinces another Fire & Flame member, the fire cat Misfortune, to help Fairy Tail find Ignia, who has left to pursue Faris. At the ruins of Drasil, Erza finds that Aldoron has seemingly been slain and his lacrima destroyed by the Oración Sechs, Faris's demonic minions, which include a revived Zero, the Oración Seis' former master. The other five Seis members arrive to confront the Sechs, accompanied by a cloaked sixth figure.
20	April 9, 2025	978-4-06-539041-2	April 7, 2026	979-8-88-877674-2
172. "A Fierce Battle Amongst Demons" (魔と魔の激闘, Ma to Ma no Gekitō); 173. "A World in Turmoil" (動乱の世界, Dōran no Sekai); 174. "The Fastest Way to Live" (最速の生き様, Saisoku no Ikizama); 175. "The Essence of Evil Prayers" (悪しき祈りの真髄, Ashiki Inori no Shinzui); 176. "Shattered Hopes" (砕かれる希望, Kudakareru Kibō); 177. "An Invitation to Fairy Flame" (妖炎の誘い, Yōen no Izanai); 178. "The Key to a New Power" (新たな力への鍵, Aratana Chikara e no Kagi); 179. "The True Value of Gold" (黄金の真価, Ōgon no Shinka); 180. "To the Gentle Moon" (優しい月へ, Yasashii Tsuki e)
The Oración Seis—including Merudy, the cloaked figure—battle against the Oración Sechs, who each wield powerful black magic. Aldoron reemerges alive and separates the clash into six one-on-one battles. Erza heads to Dramil, where Ignia and Faris face each other amidst a battle between dragonized humans and those under Faris' control. The dragonized Wed intercepts Erza and is unmasked as the son of Ignia and a human. Natsu's group finds Ignia, but he ignores them and abandons his fight with Faris upon sensing an unknown power, leaving Faris to be transported to another dimension by Bestia, the leader of Fire & Flame. In Ermina, Mercphobia gives Lucy a key to summon him and use what remains of his magic power. At the ruins of Gold Owl, Gray finds Viernes' lacrima atop the dragon's back before Viernes absorbs it into his body by assuming his human form. Wendy and Carla follow after Selene as she arrives to do battle with Viernes, destroying her lacrima that she had similarly absorbed.
21	August 7, 2025	978-4-06-540351-8	September 8, 2026	979-8-88-877861-6
181. "The Possibilities of Ice" (氷の可能性, Kōri no Kanōsei); 182. "Black Ice" (黒き氷, Kuroki Kōri); 183. "Fairy vs. Flame" (妖精 vs. 炎, Yōsei vs. Honō); 184. "The Onslaught of Black and Flame" (黒と炎の猛攻, Kuro to Honō no Mōkō); 185. "Bonds of the Six Demons" (六魔の縁, Rokuma no En); 186. "The Meaning of Freedom" (自由の意味, Jiyū no Imi); 187. "A Ray of Light in a Desperate Situation" (窮地に差す光, Kyūchi no Sasu Hikari); 188. "The Mermaid's Romp" (人魚の戯れ, Ningyo no Tawamure); 189. "The Dragon's Feast" (竜の宴, Ryū no Utage)
Gray struggles against Viernes' ability to transmute his ice magic into gold with alchemy. Using his Devil Slayer magic imbued with Wendy's Dragon Slayer magic, Gray produces a form of ice that bypasses Viernes' alchemy and incapacitates the dragon, which allows Selene to destroy his lacrima. Selene transports Natsu's teammates to Dramil, where Wed is joined by the dragonized Lage, Rekka, and Signario Sisters. The two teams clash in a five-on-five battle, while Selene confronts Aldoron's God Seed within the wood dragon's body. Meanwhile, the Oración Seis members Erik and Sawyer kill the Oración Sechs members Blade and Bird, respectively, while the Seis' Richard, Sorano, Merudy, and Macbeth are defeated by the Sechs' Gaia, Daemon, Gate, and Zero. Several members of Fairy Tail arrive to assist the Seis: Juvia rescues Merudy from Gate, whom she vanquishes; Mirajane and Elfman Strauss face Daemon and Gaia, respectively; and Gajeel engages Zero in battle.
22	December 9, 2025	978-4-06-541885-7	December 8, 2026	979-8-88-877983-5
190. "For Those We Hold Dear" (大切なものの為に, Taisetsu na Mono no Tame ni); 191. "Real Dragons" (本物の竜(ドラゴン), Honmono no Doragon); 192. "A Greater Threat" (さらなる脅威, Sara naru Kyōi); 193. "Black Dragon's Successor" (黒竜を継ぐもの, Kokuryū o Tsugu Mono); 194. "True Aim" (真の狙い, Shin no Nerai); 195. "Love Is Man" (愛とは漢なり, Ai to wa Otoko nari); 196. "Full-Throttle Takeover!!" (接収(テイクオーバー)全開!!, Teikuōbā Zenkai!!); 197. "The Flames' Smell" (炎の匂い, Honō no Nioi); 198. "Bestia's Recollections" (ベスティアの追憶, Besutia no Tsuioku)
Natsu's team defeats Fire & Flame, returning them to their human forms. Elefseria teleports Natsu's team to face Ignia, who awakens the Calamity Bloods—five of the seven dragons that attacked Fiore around the Grand Magic Games, kept in stasis and strengthened by Dogramag—and casts the spell Universe Omega to spread the dragonization process across Guiltina. Faris escapes from Bestia's dimension to confront Aldoron, who is revealed to be the true source of the dragonization magic. Ignia immobilizes Natsu's friends to be dragonized, leaving Natsu trapped in Bestia's dimension to witness the unfolding battle, including Mirajane and Elfman defeating their opponents. Misfortune finds Laxus separated from Gajeel's team and brings him into Bestia's dimension to help Natsu. Natsu defeats Bestia after empowering himself with her flames, which he recognizes as Igneel's flames, restored by Bestia from the residual magic left from Natsu's first battle against Zeref. Falling unconscious from overexertion, Natsu is brought out of the dimension by Laxus, who vows to deal with Aldoron.
23	April 9, 2026	978-4-06-543304-1	March 2, 2027	979-8-90-074101-7
199. "Indestructible Resolve" (壊さぬ覚悟, Kowasanu Kakugo); 200. "Awakening Flames" (目覚める焱, Mezameru Honō); 201. "The Three-Way Fight Ignites" (激化する三つ巴, Gekika suru Mitsudomoe); 202. "All the Days We Lived" (積み重ねた日々, Tsumikasaneta Hibi); 203. "Lively Dragon Flight" (竜(ドラゴン)の躍動, Doragon no Yakudō); 204. "The Head of the Dragons" (竜(ドラゴン)の頂, Doragon no Itadaki); 205. "Black Flames of Destruction" (破壊の黒炎, Hakai no Kokuen); 206. "A Calamity of Dragons" (竜(ドラゴン)の禍, Doragon no Wazawai)
After Gajeel kills Zero, Misfortune brings Laxus and Natsu to Aldoron's body, where Ignia and Faris resume their duel. Aldoron nearly completes Universe Omega until Natsu reawakens and uses Igneel's power to cripple him, allowing Selene to defeat Aldoron's God Seed and reverse Fairy Tail's dragonization. Natsu joins Ignia and Faris's battle, during which Faris attempts to possess Ignia after he devours her. However, Ignia resists her control and merges with her, gaining a new Black Flame Dragon form. Accompanied by Faris's spirit, Ignia defeats Natsu and leaves him for dead. Meanwhile, the mortally wounded Aldoron spreads his and Dogramag's combined magic across Guiltina, which creates dragons from the earth and separates Natsu's allies. The scattered wizards are confronted by the humanoid Calamity Bloods: Erza faces Motherglare and her brood of miniature dragons; Gray and Juvia encounter Anchor, who transforms them into water; and Lucy and Wendy are cornered by Earth Build while attempting to revive Natsu.
24	August 7, 2026	978-4-06-544639-3	July 13, 2027	979-8-90-074335-6
207. "Confronting the Calamity" (禍との対峙, Wazawai to no Taiji); 208. "Ice Love" (氷の愛, Kōri no Ai); 209. "What I Want to Protect" (守りたいもの, Mamoritai Mono); 210. "The Flame's Meaning" (炎の意味, Honō no Imi); 211. "Trust Your Guildmates" (仲間を信じて, Nakama o Shinjite); 212. "The Dragons" (竜(ドラゴン)乱舞, Doragon Ranbu); 213. "Fighting Dragons with Dragons" (竜(ドラゴン)を以て竜(ドラゴン)を制す, Doragon o Motte Doragon o Seisu); 214. "Summoner" (召喚士, Shōkanshi); 215. "Water and Moon" (水と月, Mizu to Tsuki)
Gray and Juvia are changed back to normal by Juvia's water magic, which Gray enhances with his ice magic to freeze Anchor. Meanwhile, Natsu awakens with a split personality that is quickly revealed to be Igneel, who lends Natsu his power to seemingly defeat Earth Build. Natsu then departs to face Ignia, who begins creating an artificial sun with which to destroy Guiltina. However, the Calamity Bloods all assume their dragon forms and launch a counterattack against the wizards, with the exception of the dragon Levia, who steals and imprisons Laxus's soul. Selene aids Lucy against Earth Build and the vengeful Wed, dousing Wed's flames with a torrent of water that Lucy uses to summon Mercphobia. The two Dragon Gods bestow Lucy with their power, which allows her to defeat Wed but is insufficient against Earth Build. Under Selene's instruction, Wendy reaches Aldoron's underground core to enchant her scattered allies with Dragon Slayer magic through it, unaware that Aldoron's still-living God Seed is nearby.
25	December 9, 2026	978-4-06-546208-9	—	—

== Chapters not yet in tankōbon format ==
These chapters have yet to be published in a tankōbon volume. They were originally serialized in Kodansha's Magazine Pocket app from July to October 2026.

216. "Verdure" (翠, Midori)
217. "Verdure Envelops the World" (翠は世界を包む, Midori wa Sekai o Tsutsumu)
218. "Mother's Power" (母の力, Haha no Chikara)
219. "Scarlet Link" (緋色の繋がり, Hiiro no Tsunagari)
220. "Allies' Existence" (仲間の存在, Nakama no Sonzai)
221. "Life-Jail Dragon" (命牢竜, Meirōryū)
222. "Becoming a Man Who Can Protect" (守れる漢に, Mamoreru Otoko ni)
223. "The Essence of Takeover" (接収の真髄, Sesshū no Shinzui)
