= Glyph (disambiguation) =

A glyph is a type of mark.

Glyph may also refer to:

== Arts, entertainment and media ==
- Glyph (Transformers), a fictional character
- Glyph (album), by Floater
- Glyph (novel), 2026 novel by Ali Smith (sequel to her 2024 Gliff)
- Glyph Comics Awards, a comics award

== Science and technology ==
- Glyph (data visualization), any marker, such as an arrow or similar marking, used to specify part of a scientific visualization.
- Glyph (typography), a letterform

== See also ==
- Anaglyph 3D, Method of representing images in 3D
- Basic Glyphs for Arabic Language, Unicode code block Arabic Presentation Forms-B
- Builder's signature, Tradesperson's signature on constructed project
- Glyph Bitmap Distribution Format, a file format for computer fonts
- Hieroglyph (disambiguation)
- Maya script, also known as "Maya glyphs"
- Triglyph, an architectural term for the vertically channelled tablets of the Doric frieze in classical architecture
- Petroglyph – Images carved on a rock surface as a form of rock art
- Grapheme: in typpgraphy, a glyph is one physical expression of a grapheme.
  - Representative glyph: In material about a grapheme, the author must select one of the range of glyphs that could be used for it, without intending to convey any implication that it is the "correct" one. This choice is called a 'representative glyph'
- Gryph (disambiguation)
- Gliff, 2024 novel by Ali Smith (followed by her 2026 Glyph)
