= Anaglyph =

Anaglyph (Greek ana+gluphein - "to carve") may refer to:

- Anaglyph 3D, a method of encoding a three-dimensional image in a single picture by superimposing a pair of pictures
- Ornament (art) carved in low relief

== See also ==
- Glyph (disambiguation)
