= Gryph =

Gryph may refer to:

- Gryph (Dungeons & Dragons), a fictional monster in the role-playing game
- Marn "Gryph" Hierogryph, a fictional Star Wars character
- Gryph, the sports mascot of University of Guelph, Canada
  - Gryphs, nickname of the Guelph Gryphons athletics team

== See also ==
- Gryphon (disambiguation)
- Gryffe
- Gryf
- Grif (disambiguation)
- Glyph (disambiguation)
