= Concentrate (disambiguation) =

Concentrate may also refer to:

== Music ==
- Concentrated, an EP by Fear Zero
- Concentrate, a 2018 album by the Happy Fits
- "Concentrate", a song by Floater from their 2010 album Wake.
- "Concentrate", song by Aim Frying the Fat 1995
- "Concentrate", a song by Demi Lovato from her album Tell Me You Love Me
- "Concentrate", a song by Xzibit from his album Full Circle

== Other ==
- Concentrate (screenplay), a never-filmed 1958 screenplay by Russian film director Andrei Tarkovsky
- Ore concentrate, in extractive metallurgy, the product of benefaction with a higher grade than the feed.
