= Rave Master =

Japanese manga series

- Cover of the first North American volume, featuring Haru Glory (right) and Plue (left)
- Genre: Adventure; Fantasy
- Manga
- Written by: Hiro Mashima
- Published by: Kodansha
- English publisher: NA: Tokyopop (former); Del Rey Manga (former); Kodansha Comics (digital)
- Imprint: Shōnen Magazine Comics
- Magazine: Weekly Shōnen Magazine
- Original run: July 6, 1999 – July 27, 2005
- Volumes: 35
- Anime television series
- Directed by: Takashi Watanabe
- Music by: Kenji Kawai
- Studio: Studio Deen
- Licensed by: NA: Tokyopop
- Original network: TBS
- English network: SEA: AXN; UK: Toonami UK; US: Cartoon Network (Toonami), Syfy
- Original run: October 13, 2001 – September 28, 2002
- Episodes: 51
- Video game
- Developer: Konami
- Publisher: Konami
- Genre: Action, fighting
- Platform: GameCube
- Released: JP: March 20, 2002; NA: March 8, 2005
- Video game

Special Attack Force
- Developer: KCEJ
- Publisher: Konami
- Genre: Action, fighting
- Platform: Game Boy Advance
- Released: JP: September 29, 2002; NA: March 8, 2005
- icon

Rave Master, Rave, and alternatively, The Groove Adventure Rave in Japan, is a Japanese manga series written and illustrated by Hiro Mashima. The series follows Haru Glory, a teenager on a quest to find the five fragments of Rave, the sacred stone of light, to bring peace to the world by defeating the criminal group Demon Card. Mashima created this series with the idea of travelling around the world and was presented with difficulties in its serialization due to its considerable length.

The manga was serialized in Kodansha's Weekly Shōnen Magazine from July 1999 to July 2005, with its chapters collected in 35 tankōbon volumes. The manga series was licensed for an English release in North America by Tokyopop until Kodansha allowed their contract to expire. It was also adapted into a 51-episode anime television series by Studio Deen, which was broadcast on TBS from October 2001 to September 2002. Tokyopop also licensed the anime adaptation, which was broadcast in the United States on Cartoon Network from June 2004 to July 2005.

By 2020, the manga had 23.5 million copies in circulation.

== Plot ==
In 0015, the world is corrupted by Dark Brings, (Note: Known as "Shadow Stones" in the English anime dub.) evil stones that bestow powerful magic with different abilities to their owners. The Dark Brings are used by the Raregroove Kingdom, which is opposed by the Symphonia Kingdom with the five Rave stones. Shiba Roses, the Rave Master, attempts to destroy Sinclaire, the "mother" of all of the Dark Brings, with the Ten Powers Sword. (Note: Known as the "Ten Commandments" (テン・コマンドメンツ) in Japanese, and the "Decaforce Sword" in the English anime dub.) However, the aftermath causes a massive explosion known as Overdrive, destroying one-tenth of the known world. Shiba, protected from the disaster by his special guardian "dog" Plue, holds onto the Rave required to power his sword. Plue and the four remaining Raves, however, get scattered around the world.

Fifty years later, sixteen-year-old Haru Glory lives on the peaceful Garage Island with his older sister, Cattleya. Shortly after Haru accidentally fishes Plue up, Shiba arrives wishing to reclaim Plue, but a group from the terrorist organization Demon Card (Note: Known as the "Shadow Guard" in the English anime dub.) arrives to kill Shiba. Shiba recognizes Haru as the second Rave Master and entrusts the Ten Powers, Plue, and his Rave to him. Seeking power to defeat Demon Card, Haru and Plue set off on a journey to find the missing Rave stones. Upon arriving at the mainland, Haru gradually amasses a group of friends and allies, including a girl named Elie, who harbors a magical energy known as Etherion within her body. During his showdown with Demon Card's leader, Gale "King" Raregroove, Haru reunites with his absent father, Gale Glory, who helps him defeat King, but sacrifices himself to save his son from the destruction of King's headquarters.

Some time later, Demon Card is reestablished by King's son, Lucia, who wishes to capture Elie to use Etherion. While facing Demon Card, Haru's group learns of a mythical creature known as Endless, which threatens mankind by provoking another Overdrive, which can only be destroyed by Etherion. Using the Sinclaires, Lucia absorbs Endless with the goal of destroying the world, which is actually a parallel dimension created by his ancestor after the original was ruined by a plague, cursing his family as a result. To avoid another Overdrive, Haru and his friends oppose Lucia and his strongest forces at the mystical Star Memory. Although Haru defeats Lucia, he is absorbed by Endless and convinces Elie to destroy it at the apparent cost of his life. One year later, Elie has lost her memories of Haru, and she and the others visit his grave. Haru appears alive thanks to the Star Memory's magic and reunites with Elie, who then remembers him. The warriors go their separate ways, with Haru and Elie returning to Garage Island to live together.

== Development ==
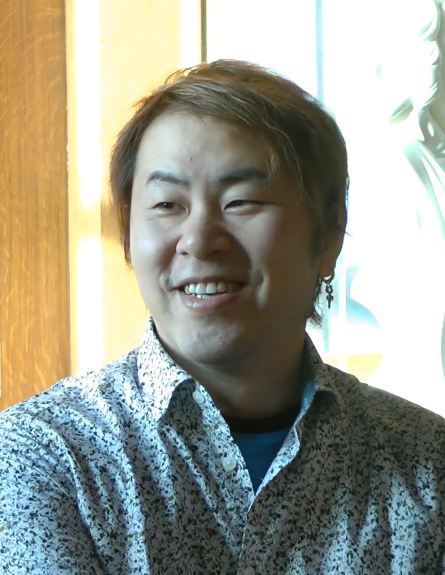
Manga author Hiro Mashima expressed both joy and difficulty in making the series due its themes.

Hiro Mashima created Rave Master with the idea of travelling around the world. Composed of thirty-five volumes, Mashima comments that although it was sometimes difficult to think of how to develop the storyline, he still remembers enjoying the making of Rave Master. Additionally, he regards that the series' end was "a little sentimental, a little sad." In early chapters Mashima had multiple difficulties with the series' backgrounds. Nevertheless, across the volumes Mashima realized how the art was evolving resulting in most appealing pages. During publication, Rave Master was supposed to end in its ninth volume with King and Demon Card's defeat and all of the plot's mysteries resolved. This was planned since Mashima had the desire to make a new manga. In the end, he decided to continue with Rave Master following King's arc after finding such an ending too contrived.

In both Rave Master and his other manga Fairy Tail, Mashima wants to make justice prevail but also make readers understand the villains' reasons to fight the main character in order to make them more complex characters. In some cases, Mashima admitted having writer's block as he did not plan the abilities of certain characters with some readers referring to the Dark Brings as "too convenient." The protagonist, Haru, was designed prior to developing the story as he was a male character Mashima always wanted to draw. His sidekick, Plue, was also designed much earlier when he was in high school. Plue was given his own sidestory much to Mashima's surprise because of the funny looking characters designed for a shonen magazine.

== Media ==
=== Manga ===
Written and illustrated by Hiro Mashima, Rave Master was serialized in Kodansha's shōnen manga magazine Weekly Shōnen Magazine from July 6, 1999, (Note: The series started in the magazine's 32nd issue of 1999 (cover date July 21), released on July 6 of the same year.) to July 27, 2005. (Note: The series finished in the magazine's 35th issue of 2005 (cover date August 10), released on July 27 of the same year.) Its 296 chapters were published in thirty-five tankōbon volumes by Kodansha, released from November 17, 1999, to September 16, 2005. The series was later rereleased in eighteen bunkoban volumes between August 10, 2006, and April 12, 2007.

Rave Master was licensed for an English release in North America by Tokyopop, which released 32 volumes of the series. On August 31, 2009, Tokyopop announced that they would not be completing the series as their licenses with Kodansha expired and Kodansha required that they immediately stop publication of all previously licensed series, including Rave Master. The next month, it was announced that Del Rey Manga had acquired the license and would begin publishing the remaining volumes in 2010. The last three volumes were published in a single omnibus volume. Del Rey never released the earlier volumes before their license expired. In 2017 Kodansha USA licensed the series for release in digital format, and released all volumes on October 3 of that same year. Rave Master was also one of the first manga series released in Spanish in North America by Public Square Books.

In 2011, Mashima authored a crossover one-shot between Rave Master and Fairy Tail. It was published in Kodansha's Magazine Special May issue. Another crossover manga between Rave Master, Fairy Tail, and Edens Zero was published in Weekly Shōnen Magazine from October 16 to December 25, 2019.

=== Anime ===
The series was adapted into a fifty-one episode anime series, entitled Groove Adventure Rave, by Studio Deen. It was directed by Takashi Watanabe and the music was composed by Kenji Kawai. The anime premiered on TBS on October 13, 2001, and ran until September 28, 2002. The anime series is based on the first twelve volumes of the manga series. The series was also collected in a total of seventeen DVD volumes between February 6, 2002, and June 4, 2003.

Tokyopop licensed the series for release and broadcast in North America. As with the manga, Tokyopop released the series under the name Rave Master. Rita Majkut produced the English-language version, which edited the series for its content and length and given an alternate musical score composed by Glenn Scott Lacey. The dub was recorded at Bill & Ted's Recording Studio in Burbank. The ADR writer was Bob Buchholz, and Marc Handler was the voice director for all of the episodes. The dub aired on Cartoon Network in the United States, premiering in June 2004 as part of the Toonami programming block. The series' second half began airing on January 22, 2005. It was also on the MiGUZi weekday afternoon after-school action block and its Sunday Morning daytime lineup of Summer 2005. Syfy would begun airing the series on March 16, 2009, as part of its "Ani-Monday" programming block, where it ran until its conclusion on September 21, 2009. Tokyopop released three DVD volumes of the series and in 2010 it collected the entire series.

The one-shot crossover between Rave Master and Fairy Tail was adapted into an original video animation with Mashima himself acting as supervisor to the project and had expanded the original chapter to include more characters from Rave Master. It was released on August 16, 2013, alongside the thirty-ninth volume of Fairy Tail.

=== CDs ===
The Japanese audio by Kenji Kawai was released in a total of four CD soundtracks by King Records. Geneon also published a CD based on the Japanese soundtrack for English release under the title of Rave Master: Music Side.

=== Video games ===
There are six video games based on Rave Master published by Konami. Three games were released for the PlayStation including the role-playing games Groove Adventure Rave and its sequel Groove Adventure Rave: Mikan no Hiseki (GROOVE ADVENTURE RAVE ～未完の秘石～), and platforming game Plue no Daibouken from Groove Adventure Rave.

For Nintendo's consoles Konami released both Groove Adventure Rave and Rave Master: Special Attack Force! (Groove Adventure Rave: Hikari to Yami no Daikessen 2), two fighting games for the Game Boy Advance, and Rave Master, which was released on the GameCube.

== Reception ==
The Rave Master manga has been well received with its Western release appearing in Diamond Comic Distributors's graphic novels charts. The manga and anime series also received positive impressions from Jason Thompson's book Manga: The Complete Guide, giving the series a positive review of 3 out of 4 stars. Chris Beveridge from Mania Entertainment also enjoyed the series recommending people to buy multiple volumes rather than one to enjoy the connected story arcs. He praised the series' fight scenes coupled with the emotional content that makes the series worth reading. UK Anime Network writer Rory Carlyle shared similar comments as he viewed the series to be "pretty good" despite having common standards seen in multiple shōnen manga. Carlyle was surprised by the multiple character designs that included humanoid and superdeformed characters besides common ones like Haru. The artwork was also praised by Anime News Network's Allen Divers who referred to the series as "a try before you buy" based on the simple storyline.

The anime series was praised by Anime News Network and DVDTalk for its animation, although its fight scenes received a negative response. In addition, Tokyopop's English dub for the series garnered significant criticism for its script rewrites, voice acting, and soundtrack. Both reviewers found that the series was better suited towards a young audience but expected an uncut version of the anime to attract older fans.

By 2020, the manga had 23.5 million copies in circulation.
