= Burning Sosobra =

Studio album by Floater
- Released: 2000
- Genre: Rock
- Label: Elemental Records
- Producer: Robert Wynia, Perter Cornett

Floater chronology
Angels in the Flesh and Devils in the Bone (1998)	Burning Sosobra (2000)	Alter (2002)

Burning Sosobra is the fourth studio album by American rock band Floater, released in July 2000. It featured eleven new songs, a cover of The Doors' "Waiting for the Sun", "Watched Over By Crows" (an older song that existed prior to the release Angels in the Flesh and Devils in the Bone), and a new recording of "Alcoholic", which previously appeared only as a radio edit on Danny Boy plus three. The first release of Burning Sosobra was a limited edition fold-out cardboard case with liner notes inserted inside. All subsequent releases have been in a jewel case.

== Track listing ==
1. "Here Comes the Dog" – 4:02
2. "Watched Over by Crows" – 3:24
3. "I Know" – 4:23
4. "Queen of the Goats" – 6:15
5. "Exiled" – 4:49
6. "Independence Day" – 3:44
7. "The Rabbit King" – 3:41
8. "Milk of Heaven" – 4:51
9. "Albatross" – 3:46
10. "The Marriage of the Black Sheep" – 3:36
11. "Colorblind" – 3:14
12. "Waiting for the Sun" – 3:35
13. "Alcoholic" – 4:42
14. "Equinox" – 4:23
