= McGruff (disambiguation) =

McGruff may refer to:

- McGruff the Crime Dog, an American fictional character appearing in public service announcements
- McGruff (truck), an American monster truck named after McGruff the Crime Dog

== See also ==
- McGriff (disambiguation)
