= Glyph (album) =

Studio album by Floater
- Released: May 1995
- Genre: Rock
- Length: 69:05
- Label: Elemental
- Producer: Floater

Floater chronology
| Sink (1994) | Glyph (1995) | Angels in the Flesh and Devils in the Bone (1998) |

Song sample
- 29 seconds of "The Sad Ballad of Danny Boy": file; help

Glyph is the second studio album by American rock band Floater, released in May 1995. The album was engineered and mixed by the Grammy-nominated Drew Canulette (Nirvana, Soundgarden, Neil Young). Glyph received a preliminary Grammy nomination in the category of Best Alternative Performance. The album was initially intended to be an EP featuring leftover songs that never made it onto the Sink album. Some of the tracks, such as "The Sad Ballad of Danny Boy", "The Face of Order", and "Dead", were previously recorded on the Sink demo tape prior to the release of the Sink album. Later, though, additional tracks were added, blending the entire album into one complete, seamless audio experience.

"The Sad Ballad of Danny Boy" received national radio play on Z Rock stations. The album is also the first time that Peter Cornett debuted a track featuring his vocals. "Bottle" would not be his last either, as he again appeared on the Acoustics album.

Two versions of Glyph are known to exist. The first press, which had a very limited release, has the same artwork as on both albums, but the fonts appear to be a white Arial, with "Floater" and "Glyph" on the cover, and no title on the disc. The disc artwork matches the artwork found on the cover. The inside tray also has the same artwork as the cover. The fourth track "Silt" was renamed "Midnight Ride" when released on the second pressing, and was six seconds longer than "Midnight Ride". The second press, which is the most common, has a yellow/gold font and shows an Egyptian hieroglyph which represents million, many or the Egyptian God "Heh", the same is on the disc art. The inside tray art is different and has the glyph symbol with a different background than the original release. Some of the earlier releases of the second press of Glyph also included a paper flyer (the same size as the cover) inserted with the disc promoting the previous album Sink. The original first pressing was of 500 copies.

== Track listing ==
1. "The Knowing Dirge" – 5:45
2. "... But the Rain Never Came" – 0:57
3. "Cinema" – 4:55
4. "Silt" – 2:58 (1st pressing) "Midnight Ride" – 2:52 (2nd pressing)
5. "All the Stories but One" – 6:41
6. "Dead" – 3:47
7. "Intermezzo" – 2:07
8. "Isolation" – 4:40
9. "Clean Plastic Baby" – 9:01
10. "The Face of Order" – 4:17
11. "Pet" – 4:45
12. "Persecutor" – 6:41
13. "Bottle" – 3:07
14. "The Sad Ballad of Danny Boy" – 3:17
15. "Crawl Into You" – 6:11
16. "Untitled" – 0:44
