= Floater (band) =

American rock band

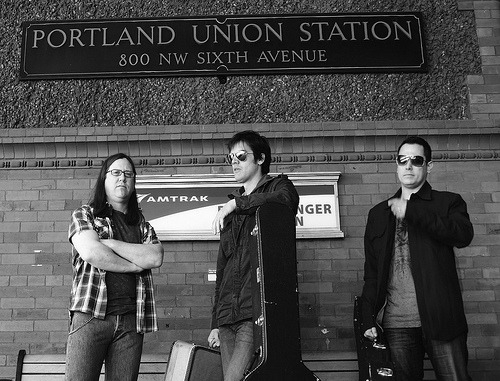
- Floater

Background information
- Origin: Eugene, Oregon, United States
- Genres: Rock, alternative rock
- Years active: 1993–present
- Labels: Elemental, Typhon
- Members: David Amador; Mark Powers; Robert Wynia
- Past members: Peter Cornett
- Website: www.floater.com

Floater is an American rock band based in Portland, Oregon. The band was started in 1993 by Robert Wynia, along with Peter Cornett and David Amador. They are known for their progressive concept albums, stylized storytelling, intense live performances, and devoted fanbase. The band was a musical guest for Live Wire Radio on OPB radio. The band was voted the "Best Band" in the Willamette Week "Best of Portland" reader's poll for 2009 and 2010.

== History ==
=== Formation, Sink & Glyph (1993-1997) ===
The seeds for Floater were planted when Robert Wynia placed a musician-wanted ad in Eugene, Oregon and it was answered by Cornett. By 1992, they had formed the band Henry's Child. Rob and Pete left Henry's Child after the musical direction was not what they wanted, and they formed a band called The Dog's. Sometime after, their guitarist got drunk and ruined a local gig and Dave Amador stepped in to replace him. The moniker of The Dog's was replaced with Floater. It was 1993 and they began playing small garage parties and eventually the University of Oregon. In early 1994, Floater recorded their first four-song demo tape Stiff & Restless at Pro-Arts studio. Later, in early 1994, Floater recorded a nine-song demo tape Sink, which was the four tracks off of Stiff & Restless, plus 5 new songs, which were recorded at the home of a friend in his studio. This tape impressed the indie record label Elemental when Rob and Pete handed Jonathan Boldt a copy, and they were signed a short time later. Floater's first full-length album, Sink, was released on September 9, 1994 and contained some songs from the demos. One year later in October 1995, a second full-length album was released, titled Glyph. This album increased the band's popularity in the Pacific Northwest and allowed tours further east, into Arizona, Utah and Texas as well as an excursion to New York in the fall of 1996.

"The Sad Ballad of Danny Boy"
"The Sad Ballad of Danny Boy" received nationwide radioplay on Z Rock.

With the popularity of their song "The Sad Ballad of Danny Boy" and the help of then soon-to-be defunct national Z Rock radio network, Floater's airplay increased greatly. The network shut down in late 1996, but not before acquiring scattered fans across the nation as in Georgia, Iowa, New Jersey, and even outside the U.S. in Quebec. In another deleted internet article, it was mentioned that Floater also received play via Digital Music Express circa 1996.

During these first few years, Floater received nominations to the preliminary level of the Grammy Awards from NARAS in 1995 under "Best Rock Performance" for Sink and in 1996 under "Best Alternative Performance" for Glyph. According to World Drum! a newsletter for CD World in Eugene and Corvallis, Floater sold 21,000 copies of Sink and Glyph combined. The newsletter also mentioned Floater ranked in the top 5 of Pandemonium's Annual Readers' Poll for "Best Northwest Band on an Independent Label", consistently in The Rocket's "Northwest Top Twenty Chart", and having garnered the esteemed "Gavin Rocks" selection of the best band of all 300 participating in the NXNW Music Festival conference. At this time, Floater was also playing popular venues like the WOW Hall in Eugene, and La Luna and the Crystal Ballroom in Portland.

=== Angels In the Flesh... / Burning Sosobra (1998-2001) ===
Just before Floater released their third album, Angels in the Flesh and Devils in the Bone in May 1998, the band moved to Portland, Oregon where they remain today. Coinciding with this move, the band's sound slightly changed with the release of Angels. In an article from The Rocket, it was mentioned the band was ready to "ditch some of [their more rude fans.]" The album is noted for the college radio single "Mexican Bus". Prior to and throughout this time, Floater was being visited by interested major labels including Zoo Records, but they would remain unsigned by a major label.

"Exiled"
"Exiled" from Burning Sosobra.

In September 2000, Burning Sosobra was released and it marked a shift in the use of samples that Floater was known for. Rather than sampling movies and television, the band began creating the majority of their own sounds for inclusion on their albums. Burning Sosobra represented a lifting of burdens for Floater, symbolized by the burning effigy on the cover of the album. With Sosobra, Floater moved into a new phase, having purged a dubious manager and beginning to work with Cassandra Thorpe, who bought Elemental Records on September 9, 1999. The sculpture in the cover photo was a collaboration between Floater and Mark Orme. "Exiled" is considered the single of Burning Sosobra. Other notable tracks include "Independence Day" and "Waiting for the Sun," a cover of The Doors.

=== Alter & Acoustics (2002-2006) ===
Floater experimented with acoustic in-store performances throughout the late 1990s, but around the time of their New Year's Eve show in 2000/2001 at the Aladdin Theater, Floater began including entire acoustic sets in their performances. A part of the Aladdin show would be released on their second live album, Live at the Aladdin. Floater subsequently released Alter, their fifth full-length album in July 2002. The album was noted as a first step in altering their sound; however, the shift in sound was markedly less than expected. Floater's sound shifted from a focus on heavy riffs to a well-rounded and eclectic sound.

The band's exploration in sound continued with their 2004 album Acoustics. This would coincide with an increase in acoustic performances abroad. Floater regularly plays back-to-back shows with one electric set and one acoustic set.

=== Stone By Stone (2006 to 2008) ===
Floater's 2006 release, Stone By Stone, is their most critically acclaimed record to date. The album bridged a familiar older Floater sound in the case of "An Apology" and coupled it with a new creativity infused in their songs like "Weightless," "Breakdown," and "Tonight No One Knows." "An Apology", considered the single of the album, has lyrical content suggesting a sarcastic apology: as one eye looks to the future and the other in the past.

"An Apology"
"An Apology" from Stone By Stone.

The album also marks a time of increased effort to tour more extensively in the western United States. Floater has expanded greatly, playing larger venues in some cities, like The Showbox in Seattle, Washington and the McDonald Theatre in Eugene, Oregon. They also began playing more cities along their tours through Idaho, Utah, Nevada, Arizona, and California.

=== Wake (2009 to present) ===
By 2009, Floater started work on recording their eighth full-length album. Some of the tracks that were expected to appear on the upcoming album were previously recorded during the Stone By Stone sessions.

By this time, Floater hired Alex Steininger as their new manager. The band set its sights on achieving national recognition. Floater released its eighth studio album, Wake in 2010 and paid for it out of their own pockets. The album received both positive and negative reviews from both the Willamette Week and The Portland Mercury. Already, Steininger's influence can be felt as Floater has made appearances on PDXposed and OPB's Live Wire program.

Floater was inducted into the Oregon Music Hall of Fame in 2017.

In the lead up to the band's ninth album, the band switched drummers. Mark Powers replaced Pete Cornett on December 31, 2017 when he made his debut at the Star Theater in Portland. Floater released their ninth album The Thief in May 2018 after an 8-year interval. Powers is also featured on this album. Willamette Week's "Best of Portland Reader's Poll" selected Floater as Best Local Musician/Musical Group for 2018.

On November 20, 2021, it was learned that Peter Cornett, the band's original drummer, had died.

== Discography ==
=== Studio albums ===
- Sink (1994)
- Glyph (1995)
- Angels in the Flesh and Devils in the Bone (1998)
- Burning Sosobra (2000)
- Alter (2002)
- Acoustics (2004)
- Stone By Stone (2006)
- Wake (2010)
- The Thief (2018)

== Live shows ==
Floater adds further variety to their live performances by adding various cover songs into their set list and integrating new verses into their own songs. They are also known for covering songs that do not necessarily coincide with their genre, such as:

- The Doors – "Waiting for the Sun" is featured on their album Burning Sosobra.
- U2 – "Seconds" – "Party Girl"
- Pink Floyd – "Run Like Hell"
- The Beatles – "Helter Skelter"
- The Fixx – "Red Skies" (partial - included with "Settling" live)
- Elton John – "Rocketman"
- Depeche Mode – "Personal Jesus"
- Traditional Irish ballad – "Wild Irish Rover"
- Pink Floyd – "Animals (Complete Work)"

=== Samples ===
Samples are used extensively in Floater's live performances and earlier albums, either from movies or created by the band and local actors. Their albums Sink and Glyph included samples from movies such as Apocalypse Now, THX 1138, One Flew Over the Cuckoo's Nest, The Shining, The Last Temptation of Christ, Nice Dreams, various episodes of The Twilight Zone and old radio programs.

== Associated personnel ==
Guest performers

- Keith Brown of Threscher, Two Minutes Hate, Drumattica, TV:616 and Sentenced To Life
- Pianist for Burning Sosobra CD release tour
- TV:616 for cover of Run Like Hell
- Jen Folker of Dahlia
- Jeff Chase; fire breather for 1998 performances of Mosquito
- King Black Acid for 2009 performances of the Beatles' Helter Skelter
- Unkle Nancy of Unkle Nancy and the Family Jewels
- Jesse (Juice) Fletcher Lighting and Live Samples

Anthropomorphic Personifications

- Omar – Omar

== Side projects ==
- Sentenced to Life – Sometime around the fall of 1995, Rob Wynia and Pete Cornett collaborated with Keith Brown to develop a short-lived side project. A cassette tape of this exists called Reminders of the Soul, with the first side being live tracks performed at the WOW Hall and the second side being studio demos. About 50 copies of the cassette tape were handed out according to Keith Brown, and around a dozen shows played in the Eugene area. At the time of this collaboration, Keith Brown was a part of the band Threscher. Keith would eventually go on to play several shows with Floater as a guest performer, filling in on acoustic guitar, bass and vocals.
- Drumattica – A tribal/dance electronic groove band featuring Robert Wynia and David Amador.
- Riverboat – Peter Cornett's solo project.
- Robert Wynia / Robert Wynia and The Sound – The spoken word and solo music of Rob Wynia.

== See also ==
- Jolly Mon
