= Stone by Stone (album) =

Studio album by Floater
- Released: October 31, 2006
- Genre: Rock
- Label: Typhon Records

Floater chronology
Acoustics (2004)	Stone by Stone (2006)	Wake (2010)

Stone by Stone is the seventh studio album by American rock band Floater, released on October 31, 2006. The first pressing of the compact disc included the Behind The Scenes DVD documentary capturing moments from the band’s nearly fourteen years together, focused mainly on the recording sessions of the Acoustics and Stone by Stone albums, and some older footage. The second pressing was the CD only. When the band played the CD release shows for the album, they played the "Behind the Scenes" DVD as their opening act in select markets such as Eugene at the McDonald Theater.

== Track listing ==
1. An Apology
2. Ghost in the Making
3. In America
4. Weightless
5. Breakdown
6. Helping Hands
7. Spaces In Between Us
8. The Wave
9. Everything Falls Our Way
10. My Burden
11. Proviso
12. In Transition
13. Tonight No One Knows
14. Home in the Sky
