= Angels in the Flesh and Devils in the Bone =

Studio album by Floater
- Released: April 7, 1998
- Genre: Rock
- Length: 62:38
- Label: Elemental Records
- Producer: Robert Wynia, Floater

Studio chronology
| Glyph (1995) | Angels in the Flesh and Devils in the Bone (1998) | Burning Sosobra (2000) |

2001 Reissue Cover

Angels in the Flesh and Devils in the Bone is the third studio album by American rock band Floater, released on April 7, 1998. It is a concept album that describes the birth, life, death, and rebirth of an unnamed person, presumed to be a religious figure. Angels was re-released in late 2001 with new artwork.

== Track listing ==
1. "Endless I" – 2:27
2. "The Watching Song" – 2:53
3. "American Theatric" – 6:32
4. "The Feast" – 4:24
5. "The Beast" – 1:37
6. "Minister" – 4:53
7. "Medicine Woman" – 3:19
8. "Nothing" – 1:49
9. "Mexican Bus" – 2:44
10. "The Invitation" – 5:08
11. "Golden Head" – 2:30
12. "Settling" – 3:45
13. "The Last Time" – 3:43
14. "Our Hero's Resolve" – 2:37
15. "Mosquito" – 7:40
16. "The Possum's Funeral" – 1:52
17. "Endless II" – 4:45

Tracks 14 and 8 were originally a single song called "Oof".
