= O-aminophenol oxidase =

o-Aminophenol oxidase

Identifiers
- EC no.: 1.10.3.4
- CAS no.: 9013-85-8

Databases
- IntEnz: IntEnz view
- BRENDA: BRENDA entry
- ExPASy: NiceZyme view
- KEGG: KEGG entry
- MetaCyc: metabolic pathway
- PRIAM: profile
- PDB structures: RCSB PDB PDBe PDBsum
Search
- PMC: articles
- PubMed: articles
- NCBI: proteins

o-Aminophenol oxidase (EC 1.10.3.4, isophenoxazine synthase, o-aminophenol:O_{2} oxidoreductase, 2-aminophenol:O_{2} oxidoreductase, GriF) is an enzyme with systematic name 2-aminophenol:oxygen oxidoreductase. This enzyme catalyses the following chemical reaction

4
2-Aminophenol
3 O_{2}
6 H_{2}O
2
2-aminophenoxazin-3-one

o-Aminophenol oxidase is a flavoprotein. The product phenoxazine derivative can be incorporated into natural products like grixazone and actinomycin.
