= Griff (name) =

Griff is a masculine given name and a surname.

Notable people with the given name include:

- Griff Allen, American motorsports broadcaster
- Griff Barnett (1884–1958), American actor
- Griff Rhys Jones (born 1953), British comedian, writer and actor
- Griff Norman (1926—2010), Welsh footballer
- Griff Whalen (born 1990), American National Football League player
- Griff Williams (painter) (born 1966), American painter

Notable people with the surname include:

- Elli Griff, British set decorator
- Ray Griff (1940-2016), Canadian country music singer and songwriter
- Stirling Griff (born 1957), Australian politician
- Zaine Griff (born 1957), New Zealand-born singer and songwriter
