= McGriff =

McGriff is a surname, which may refer to:

== People ==
=== Music ===
- Edna McGriff (1935–1980), American rhythm-and-blues singer
- Jimmy McGriff (born 1936), American hard-bop and soul-jazz organist and organ trio bandleader

=== Sports ===
==== Baseball ====
- Fred McGriff (born 1963), American baseball player
- Terry McGriff (born 1963), American baseball player

==== Basketball ====
- Cameron McGriff (born 1997), American basketball player
- Elton McGriff (1942–2011), American basketball player

==== Football (gridiron) ====
- Curtis McGriff (born 1958), American football player
- Lee McGriff (born 1953), American football player
- Travis McGriff (born 1976), American football player, son of Lee
- Tyrone McGriff (1958–2000), American football player

==== Other sports ====
- Hershel McGriff (born 1927), American stock car racing driver

=== Other ===
- Erline P. McGriff (1924–2004), American educator in nursing
- Kenneth McGriff (born 1960), American drug trafficker and organized crime figure
- Michael McGriff, 21st century American poet
- Perry McGriff (1937–2017), American politician and collegiate athlete

== Other uses ==
- McGriff Avenue, a 2001 album by Jimmy McGriff
- Selene McGriff, a fictional character from Mobile Suit Gundam SEED C.E. 73: Stargazer

== See also ==
- McGruff (disambiguation)
