= The Thief (album) =

Studio album by Floater
- Released: 18 May 2018
- Genre: Rock
- Length: 50:57
- Label: Stone Jumping Music (BMI)
- Producer: Robert Wynia, Floater

Floater chronology
| Wake (2010) | The Thief (2018) |

The Thief is the ninth studio album by American rock band Floater, released on May 18, 2018. The entire album was debuted live at the Wonder Ballroom on May 12.

== Track listing ==
1. Light it Up
2. Like a Landslide
3. Bring Me More
4. Interlude
5. Last Forever
6. Morning You
7. The Terminal
8. Here Comes the Night
9. What If
10. Handcuffs
11. The Thief
