= Alter (album) =

Studio album by Floater
- Released: 2002
- Genre: Rock
- Length: 57:58
- Label: Elemental Records

Studio chronology
Burning Sosobra (2000)	Alter (2002)	Acoustics (2004)

Alter is the fifth studio album by American rock band Floater, released in 2002.

== Track listing ==
1. "Zero Hour" – 6:18
2. "Come See Everything" – 5:11
3. "Crusatyr" – 4:36
4. "Alone" – 5:39
5. "Tracks Across the Snow" – 5:36
6. "Rocking Horse" – 5:39
7. "Safety" – 4:32
8. "Luddite" – 4:33
9. "Hollywood" – 2:52
10. "Long Gone" – 3:19
11. "Diamond" – 4:46
12. "4 Down (A Toast)" – 4:46
