= Hieroglyph (disambiguation) =

A hieroglyph is a character of the ancient Egyptian writing system.

Hieroglyph, hieroglyphs, hieroglyphic, or hieroglyphics may also refer to:

== Writing systems ==
- An informal term for a ideogram, lexigram, logogram, or pictogram, such as:
  - Anatolian hieroglyphs
  - Chinese characters
  - Cretan hieroglyphs
  - Mesoamerican writing systems
    - Aztec script
    - Isthmian script
    - Maya script
    - Mixtec writing
    - Olmec hieroglyphs
    - Zapotec script
  - Meroitic script
  - Mi'kmaw hieroglyphs
  - Muisca art § Hieroglyphs
  - Ojibwe writing systems § Anishinaabewibii'iganan
  - Rongorongo
  - Sitelen Pona

== Literature ==
- Hieroglyph: Stories and Visions for a Better Future, a 2014 book edited by Ed Finn and Kathryn Cramer
- Hieroglyphics: The Writings of Ancient Egypt, a 1996 book by Maria Carmela Betrò

== Music ==
- Hieroglyphics (group), an American hip-hop collective
- Hieroglyphics Imperium Recordings, an American record label
- "Hieroglyphic", a song by Decrepit Birth from the 2017 album Axis Mundi
- "Hieroglyphics", a song by the Vels from the 1984 album Velocity

== Other uses ==
- Hieroglyph (TV series), an American television series
- Hieroglyphic moth, a species of moth
- Hieroglyphic Mountains, a mountain range in Arizona, United States
- Project Hieroglyph, an American writing project
