= List of Rave Master characters =

Many of the main and supporting characters of Rave Master

The Rave Master manga and anime series features an extensive cast of characters created by Hiro Mashima. The series takes place in a fictional parallel world where humans along with species known as sentenoids and demonoids, fight using weapons, magic, and evil artifacts called Dark Brings (Shadow Stones in the anime's English dub). One of the primary users of Dark Brings is the evil terrorist organization known as Demon Card (Shadow Guard in the anime's English dub) which plans to use them to take over the world and plunge it into darkness.

The main character, Haru Glory, is chosen by the holy artifact known as Rave to wield the Ten Powers and embark on a quest with the strange dog-like creature Plue to find the remaining four Rave stones and end the use of Dark Brings thus bringing peace to the world. During his travels, he allies with a girl who has lost her memories and believes her name is Elie, unaware of her strong connection to the Rave stones. Along their journey, they gain allies known as the Rave Warriors. The Rave Warriors include Hamrio Musica, a thief who can manipulate silver, Griffon Katou, a strange blue creature and cartographer, Let Dahaka and Julia Dragoon, martial artists of the Dragon Race, Ruby, a wealthy penguin-like sentenoid; and Belnika a kind sorceress.

== Creation and design ==
When making the series Mashima wanted justice to prevail, but also wanted readers to understand the villains' reasons to fight the main character in order to make them more complex characters.

== Protagonists ==
The main characters are known as the Rave Warriors.

=== Haru Glory ===
Voiced by: Tomokazu Seki (Japanese); Yuri Lowenthal (English)

Haru Glory (ハル・グローリー, Haru Gurōrī) is the main protagonist of the series and the current Rave Master, never giving up in a fight and willing to protect others in spite of the circumstances. Born on Garage Island, Haru was raised by his older sister following their mother's death which occurred after their father departed in search of the Rave Stones. By chance, Haru pulled Plue from the ocean and met the previous Rave Master, Shiba who recognized him as his successor. After realizing the threat that the Demon Card organization posed to the world, Haru promised Shiba that he would recover the Rave Stones and defeat Demon Card with Plue by his side. Along the way, he is joined by many allies. Although each had their own goals, they were united through Haru and supported one another throughout the journey. He is very friendly and has a lot of energy. He is particularly protective of Elie and often prioritizes her safety. Haru also shows to develop a romantic interest in Elie progressively throughout the series, as it also becomes apparent in later chapters that among Haru's greatest motivations to keep fighting onward is in fact for Elie. At the end of the manga, they marry and then had a son.

As the Rave Master, Haru Glory wields a legendary weapon known as the Ten Commandments, often abbreviated as TCM. This extraordinary sword has the unique ability to transform from its base form, Eisenmeteor, into nine other distinct forms, each unlocked by embedding the mystical Rave Stones into it. These transformations make the TCM a versatile weapon in Haru's battles against Demon Card and other adversaries. During Haru's quest to obtain the final Rave Stone it is revealed that he cannot wield the sword's last form, the TCM was originally forged for Shiba, the previous Rave Master, making it incompatible with Haru for the final transformation.

=== Elie ===
Voiced by: Ayako Kawasumi (Japanese); Michelle Ruff (English)

Elie (エリー, Erī) is a mysterious girl with amnesia who uses tonfa-blasters as her primary weapon. After being saved by Haru in Georco, she travels with him to regain her memory. She is portrayed as lively and hot-tempered with a strong fondness for casinos, often using gambling to obtain funds for the group. It is later revealed that Elie harnesses the power of Etherion, an extremely destructive magic that transcends space and time. Etherion was also used by Resha Valentine (リーシャ・バレンタイン, Rīsha Barentain), a dancer from 50 years earlier who sacrificed her life to create the Rave Stones, to whom Elie is identical. After traveling to the past, Elie discovers that she is Resha Valentine, who had faked her death by encasing herself in magic to awaken in the future. Following this revelation, Elie recovers Resha's old staff and equips it in battle, which grants her the ability to summon and destroy Endless. Over the course of the story, Elie develops romantic feelings for Haru, which are reciprocated. They eventually marry and have a son at the end of the series.

=== Plue ===
Voiced by: Yukiji (Rave), Saori Goto (Fairy Tail) (Japanese); Mona Marshall (Rave), Majken Bullard (Fairy Tail, Season 1), Monica Rial (Fairy Tail, Season 2) (English)

Plue (プルー, Purū), despite his unusual appearance resembling a shivering snowman with a carrot-like nose, is the Rave Bearer and can sense the presence of the other Rave Stones. Plue's nose also has the ability to destroy Dark Bring. Plue is fond of sweets, particularly lollipops but dislikes pudding. He also likes wine and spiders. He has the ability to use the Rave of Combat, which enhances both his and Haru's strength. It is a running gag in the manga that no one is entirely sure what Plue is or even whether he is male. Most people think of him as a dinosaur, while Elie refers to him as a bug. Haru first names him "Sabutaro" which Let prefers to call him.

Plue made his debut in Mashima's 1998 one-shot Magician. In his series Fairy Tail, Plue is revised as a Nikora (ニコラ, Nikora) celestial spirit who serves as a pet for Lucy Heartfilia. In chapter 71 of Fairy Tail, Happy pulls a prank on Lucy by speaking as if he were Plue. He says he is a servant of a great hero with a sacred stone, referring to Haru. Plue has appeared in works by other authors. In chapter 22 of Air Gear, Ikki impersonates Plue by adopting his distinctive nose. In Pastel, Mugi gives Yuu a Plue doll.

=== Hamrio Musica ===
Voiced by: Showtaro Morikubo (Japanese); Doug Erholtz (English)

Hamrio Musica (ハムリオ・ムジカ, Hamurio Mujika; Hedara Musica in the anime's English dub) originally leader of a band of thieves called Silver-Rhythm, joins Haru on his journey and eventually becomes one of his closest allies. As a "Silver-Claimer", he can manipulate any silver object, such as the skull around his neck, into various forms or weapons. Later, Musica's necklace fuses with Reina's purified Dark Bring, White Kiss, upon her death, creating the weapon known as "Silver Ray". He later forges Haru the holy sword "Ravelt" (derived from "Rave" and "Welt", the German word for "World") for use in the final battle.

When he was young, Musica's family was killed by Lance of the Beast Sword, a member of Demon Card who wielded a sword forged by Musica's grandfather, Galein Musica. He was then taken in by Rize, a silver-claimer, who raised and taught him in the ways of silver-claiming. On his deathbed, Rize asked Musica to find and destroy Silver Ray, a request Musica accepted. Musica later discovered that the Oni Fortress "River Saly" was in fact Silver Ray. After a battle with the oni leader Ogre, Musica destroyed Silver Ray with Reina's help. The weapon was then reborn as an artifact, which Reina called the "Ocean-Rending Spear, Silver Ray". Musica subsequently carried both Silver Ray and Reina's silver, which had fused with his own.

=== Griffon Kato ===
Voiced by: Katsuya Shiga (Japanese); Tom Kenny (English)

Griffon Kato (グリフォン 加藤, Gurifon Katō), more commonly called Griff (グリフ, Gurifu) for short, is a strange, small blue creature who mostly praises Plue and calls him "Master Plue". Griff has limited shape-shifting abilities, such as inflating portions of his body and elongating his limbs. He is also a voyeuristic character and can often be seen spying on Elie. He is the cartographer of the group. He has a strange horse-like creature named Tanchimo (タンチモ), which he rides. Tanchimo is always seen moving its head rapidly from side to side.

=== Let Dahaka ===
Voiced by: Takehiro Murozono (Japanese); Doug Stone (English)

Let Dahaka (レット・ダハーカ, Retto Dahāka) is a member of the Dragon Race, a race of dragon people who reside in the Mystic Realm. When Let was first introduced, he was an evil warrior who worked for Demon Card as a guardian for King. He only wanted to fight until Haru defeated him and showed him the path of justice. His initial appearance in the story is of a human with a lizard-like face. In the fight against Jegan, he performs the Dragon trial and takes on the appearance of a human. Soon after, he joined Haru in hope of bringing peace to the world. He uses Dragon Roar of the Gods to defeat Jegan, which consumes one's life in return for the power. He manages to defeat Jegan and turn Julia back to normal using a potion given by Alice. He is saved by Julia, who kisses him with the potion in her mouth. In chapter 281, he is revealed to be the king of the Dragon Race, Jaava Let Dahaka (ジャヴァ・レット・ダハーカ, Java Retto Dahāka). During the fight against the Demon Card member Uta, Let turns into this form in order to kill him, but he dies in the process. He is revived by Star Memory at the end.

=== Ruby ===
Voiced by: Yukiji (Japanese); Bob Glouberman (English)

Ruby (ルビー, Rubī) is a pink penguin sentinoid who owns a massive floating casino. Ruby likes to use his wealth to buy rare treasures. When he learns Doryu is using his cash for evil ends, he is almost killed by Doryu, but Haru saves him, and he decides to join his side. He is the only person to have known who would be the third Rave Master if Haru died. Ruby also has a tendency to blab out plans that the Rave Warriors have decided on during battle, making them entirely useless. He recently learned how to use "Wind" magic from the bell given to him by his father, Pawl (パール, Pāru; "Pearl"). The bell was actually named "the Holy Bell" and it was a weapon used by Dalmatian of the Knights of the Blue Sky. It can turn into a magic sword, and use "Magic Reflection", "Twister", and "Air Ball" (from the videogame). In Chapter 75, the characters from Fairy Tail go to the casino owned by Ruby.

=== Julia ===
Voiced by: Kyoko Namikawa

Julia (ジュリア, Juria) is Let's girlfriend and fellow member of the Dragon Race. Having failed to pass the dragon trial, Julia was transformed into a dragon and tamed by Jegan of the Oracion Seis. She is saved by Let and turned back to normal using a potion given by Alice. Acting as a sisterly figure to the Rave Warriors, Julia is shown to be rowdy, violent, and somewhat of an exhibitionist. Her appearance gradually changed after her debut, from short hair to long, wavy hair.

=== Belnika ===
Belnika (ベルニカ, Berunika) is a kind girl with a shy personality. She was experimented on in an attempt to instill the power of Etherion within her. Having initially aligned herself with Blue Guardian, she was manipulated by Hardner into believing his plan would eliminate Endless. After discovering Hardner's true intentions, Belnika joins the Rave Warriors. However, it is later revealed that she never attained the power of Etherion, although she does possess a vast amount of magical power. She has the power to heal and also to negate any magic around her. She heals Haru's arm, which was in bad condition due to the effects of Sacrifar. Belnika is intensely loyal to Haru, who she seems to harbour feelings for, although she does not disrupt his relationship with Elie. She later dies from overuse of magic during the fight against the Demon Card member Jiero. She eventually comes back to life due to Star Memory.

== Supporting characters ==
=== Kingdom of Symphonia ===
==== Shiba Roses ====
Voiced by: Tomomichi Nishimura, Kouichi Toochika (younger version) (Japanese); Alan Shearman, Steven Blum (younger version) (English)

Shiba Roses (シバ・ローゼス, Shiba Rōzesu) is the first Rave Master. He acknowledged Haru as the second Rave Master when Rave chose Haru and tasked Haru with the responsibility of bringing peace to the world by gathering all the Raves. He stays behind on Garage Island while recovering from his injuries. As a final test to see if Haru is worthy of being the Rave Master, Shiba challenges him to a battle, reverting to his younger, more powerful self after drinking a special elixir from Alice. Only being able to sustain his younger body for 15 minutes, Shiba fought knowing that if he drank the elixir, he would use his remaining lifespan. Shiba, however, died happy in Elie's arms having recognised her as Resha, his "lost" and only love. In his time as Rave Master, he was known as the Sword Saint for his mastery of the sword. He is the original wielder and true master of the TCM; hence he could use all ten swords, including the self-harming ninth sword without succumbing to it as well as the original tenth sword Star Raver, while Haru couldn't even master the ninth and needed a new sword as his tenth sword.

==== Galein Musica ====
Galein Musica (ガレイン・ムジカ, Garein Mujika; "Garein Musica" in English dub) is Hamrio Musica's grandfather and the blacksmith who created the TCM during Symphonia's wars. He is renowned as the world's best blacksmith.

==== Malakia Glory ====
Malakia Symphonia Glory (マラキア・シンフォニア・グローリー, Marakia Shinfonia Gurōrī) is the deceased King of the former Symphonian Kingdom and father to Gale Glory and Grandfather of Haru. He existed in Resha's memories, having assisted her in traveling to the future, during which time he went under the alias of Kaim (カーム, Kāmu) and entrusted Evermary to take care of Gale. He is later tortured to death due to the curse placed on him by Shakuma.

==== Knights of the Blue Sky ====
The Knights of the Blue Sky (蒼天四戦士, Sōten Yosenshi) are the four strongest fighters of Symphonia that assisted Shiba during the war and died. Later they became the Guardians of the Rave stones. Deerhound (ディアハウンド, Diahaundo) is a huge brute of a warrior who seems to laugh at everything and uses a giant battle axe. After his death, he transformed into a bear, guarding the Rave of Knowledge and the graveyard of the warriors who fought for Symphonia. Clea Maltese (クレア・マルチーズ, Kurea Maruchīsu) is a dark-skinned female warrior who uses two giant knives. After death her soul was joined with an eagle and became the guardian of the Rave of Combat. Master Dalmatian (ダルメシアン, Darumeshian) is a master tactician who is almost always seen smoking a pipe. After death he borrowed the body of a walrus and became the guardian of the Rave of Destiny. He was also the original owner of the sword, Holy Bell, which is owned by Ruby in the present. Alpine Spaniel (アルパイン・スパニエル, Arupain Supanieru) is the leader of the Knights of the Blue Sky and the only one of the four who survived the war and Overdrive. He was the one that kept the other knights' souls in the borrowed bodies of animals. He guards the Rave of Truth and was the steward for Haru's final test to be the true Rave Master. He is also the most charismatic and strongest of the four and his weapon of choice is a spear. All four of the knights' surnames seem to be inspired by dog breeds.

=== Mildian ===
The citizens of Mildian (ミルディアン, Mirudian) are sorcerers tasked with the protection of time.

==== Sieghart Caesar ====
Voiced by: Masami Kikuchi (Japanese); Crispin Freeman (English)

Sieghart Caesar (ジークハルト・シーザー, Jīkuharuto Shizaa), or simply Sieg, is a 27-year-old elemental master and most powerful sorcerer from Mildian. Obsessed with upholding the time stream, he initially infiltrated Demon Card with the intention of eliminating King, and later attempts to kill Elie in order to erase the threat of Etherion. However, he later realizes that Elie's power can save the world, and aligns himself with the Rave Warriors in order to protect her. After he, Haru, and Elie are sent back 50 years in time, Sieg remains in the past in order to return the two to the present. He dies guarding Resha Valentine's grave, with Haru and Elie identifying his skeleton five decades later.

In Mashima's later work, Fairy Tail, Sieg's character design was reused as the character Jellal Fernandez, who was first introduced under the alias of Siegrain being a reference to Sieghart.

==== Miltz ====
Miltz (ミルツ, Mirutsu) is the village head of Mildian, with power considered second only to Sieghart. Widely respected by the citizens of Mildian, Miltz initially ran the village as a dictatorship, strictly punishing those who disobeyed the laws of time. He aligned himself with Haja of the Oracion Seis in order to obtain Star Memory, turning the village against Sieg as a result of his failure to eliminate Elie. However, after learning of Haja's loyalty to Demon Card, Miltz assists Sieg in the battle against him, later reforming Mildian values at Niebel's urging.

==== Niebel ====
Niebel (ニーベル, Nīberu) is a young mage from the village of Mildian who idolizes Sieghart. He is first introduced as an adolescent sorcerer specializing in illusion magic, and has stated that he was not born in Mildian. Prior to his debut, Niebel had protested Miltz's morally questionable actions, and as a result was a wanted fugitive until the years leading up to Sieg's return. He is later reaccepted into the village after the battle with Haja. It is stated by Sieg that Niebel has the potential to surpass his abilities. This theoretical power is shown during the battle against Jiero, when he uses a spell that giving him unlimited magical power, but rapidly aging him. This stalls Jiero long enough for Julia to kill her, but results in his death from old age. He is later revived by Star Memory.

=== Garage Island ===
==== Gale Glory ====
Gale Symphonia Glory VI (ゲイル・シンフォニア・グローリー六世, Geiru Shinfonia Gurōrī Rokusei) is the father of Haru and Cattleya. He is related to the first king of Symphonia, Gale "Symphonia" Glory I, who was his great-grandfather. Gale had an enchanted sword called the "Azure Sky Blade" or the "Sapphire Symphonia Sword". Gale was a former Shadow Guard or Demon Card leader. King (Gale Raregroove) was his best friend, but King obtained a shadow stone and went out of control. Glory quit Demon Card and became an Imperial. Unfortunately, King became angry with him, believing he was responsible for the death of his family, and killed Sakura, Gale's wife and Queen of Symphonia. He also slashed Gale's face and sealed a Shadow Stone inside of the newly created scar. Gale resolved to take revenge on King, and so as not to endanger the lives of his children, he never returned home. He reunites with Haru in the Tower of Din and helps him defeat King. Gale died after he protected Haru from falling rocks.

==== Cattleya Glory ====
Voiced by: Satsuki Yukino (Japanese); Cindy Robinson (English)

Cattleya Glory (カトレア・グローリー, Katorea Gurōrī) is Haru's older sister, and the self-proclaimed "Queen of "Karaoke". Since their parents were away, she had to take over in raising Haru on Garage Island. Although reluctant to let Haru leave, she eventually gives her consent. Haru often quotes things he should not do because his sister said so. She is revealed to be in a relationship with Shuda. After Haru's return, she welcomes him and Elie home and attends their wedding.

==== Branch ====
Branch (ブランチ, Buranchi) is Cattleya's ex-boyfriend who was abusive and beat her. He encountered Haru while preparing to enter a local dance competition with Nagisa, who entered as a cover to assassinate Iulius. He is later turned into a cyborg against his will by the Blue Guardians. After being strongly hated by Haru for his acts in the past, they get along moments before he died from a bomb planted by the Blue Guardians.

=== Shuda ===
Voiced by: Toshihiko Seki (Japanese); Crispin Freeman (English)

Shuda (シュダ) is the first member of Demon Card's Oracion Six to be introduced. He fought and lost to Haru Glory twice in the beginning of the series, and after his second defeat, he reforms and becomes an ally of Haru and his friends. He holds the utmost respect for Gale Glory. He uses the high six star Dark Bring Ballettänzer Zeffrea, which allows him to cause an explosion within a spherical targeting grid that manifests over a chosen point in space; it is later destroyed by Lucia. He also wields two swords: the ghost sword Entenka (which spews forth flames by cutting the wind), and the divine sword Heavenly Blossom, which is claimed to be a weapon of the gods. Shuda is also revealed to have a relationship with Haru's sister.

=== Solasido and Remi Sharpner ===
Solasido: Voiced by: Kenji Nojima (Japanese); Ping Wu (English)
Remi: Voiced by: Moyu Arishima (Japanese); Kari Wahlgren (English)

Solasido Sharpner (ソラシド・シャープナー, Sorashido Shāpunā) and Remi Sharpner (レミ・シャープナー, Remi Shāpunā) are siblings who live in Rabarrier, with Remi posing as a descendant of Clea Maltese. Musica develops an attraction towards Remi, much to Solasido's displeasure. Both of them, along with Fua (フーア, Fūa) one of the city's warriors, assisted the Rave Warriors during the battle at the Tower of Din.

=== Celia ===
Celia (セリア, Seria) is a beautiful young mermaid with long blue hair. She is the younger sister of the Queen of the underwater mermaid village, Mildesta. She falls deeply in love with Haru, much to Elie's displeasure. She is capable of using "Sea Magic", which is strong in water and can do things such as giving people the ability to breathe underwater for a limited time and can even take the form of a human on land for a certain amount of time. She teams up with the Rave Warriors for a short time to help stop the Onigami Forces and Doryu Ghost Squad who were terrorizing her people. She's voiced by Ryōka Yuzuki in some video games.

=== Alice ===
Alice (アリス, Arisu) the elixir maker is a medicine man met by Haru's gang during the journey to Southernberg island. He says "munya" a lot. Although simple-minded in appearance, usually wearing a bunny eared hat and a loincloth, he is over five hundred years old and 'wields' a giant syringe, containing various fluids that switched the souls of Haru, Elie, Musica, and Plue around, causing confusion. Alice later cured Elie's broken arm. Due to his age, he has potions with almost unbelievable effects such as enlarging a random part of a person (he used this as a gag), curing almost any wound and restoring a person to his/her true form. He also has a potion for restoring youth, in exchange for a portion of the drinker's remaining days. He was also a former classmate of Mummy of the Doryu Ghost Squad who he domineered over.

=== Saga Pendragon ===
Saga Pendragon (サガ・ペンドラゴン, Saga Pendoragon) is a prophet of Acapella Island, belonging to Nakajima's race. His poi was stolen by a tiny dandelion named "Dee Dee". He communicates with the Rave team through the power of the fourth rave. He was also the one to predict the appearance of Endless which caused Resha to fake her death so that she could fight it in the present day. In the past he was in human form and at the end of the series he is once again human. He has a maid named Sonia (ソニア) who is knowledgeable about flowers and very talkative. She was also human in the past.

=== Liberation Army ===
The Liberation Army (解放軍, Kaihōgun) is a resistance group against Demon Card and the Blue Guardians led by Yuma Ansecto (ユーマ・アンセクト, Yūma Ansekuto) and his adoptive daughter Nagisa Ansecto (ナギサ・アンセクト, Nagisa Ansekuto) who is a skilled assassin and really the biological daughter of the Blue Guardians leader Hardner. Their base of operations is an airship known as the Liberale Familia. Yuma's two best members, Mitsu and Nanahoshi, act as second-in-command during his absence and another member named Chaddock is the acting captain during their absence.

== Minor characters ==
=== Arcela Raregroove ===
Arcela Raregroove (アルセラ・レアグローブ, Arusera Reagurōbu) was the last survivor of humanity in the original timeline. Using Star Memory, she altered history in order to reverse the fate of mankind, although this resulted in the birth of Endless. Her actions supposedly cursed the Raregroove bloodline.

=== Bony the Starfish ===
Bony (ボニー, Bonī) the Starfish is a talking starfish who followed the Rave Warriors after leaving Southernburg. He is often eaten and vomited by Lazenby.

=== Chino ===
Chino (チーノ, Chīno) is a boy from Ska Village who blamed the constant raining caused by Go & Rosa on frogs and tried to hurt them. His mother Lasagna (ラザーニャ, Razānya) runs the hotel in Ska Village. An older version of him appears later on in one of the Rave 0077 mini chapters.

=== Evermary ===
Evermary (エバーマリー, Ebāmarī) is an elder who resided at the Star Vestige who enjoys eating apples. He was Gale Glory's adoptive father.

=== Feber ===
Feber (フェーベル, Fēberu) is probably the weakest named enemy in the series. He was the first Demon Card soldier Haru fought. He badly injured Shiba with a bazooka in Volume 1, but Haru punched him with the Rave and defeated him. Shuda later gave him the Dark Bring "Full Metal", which enabled him to turn his skin into metal. He went after Haru again, and was again defeated with the Explosion form of Ten Powers Sword. It is possible Gemma later hired him in Cafe Tsubomi.

=== Genma ===
Genma (ゲンマ) is the owner of Cafe Tsubomi on Garage Island. He is good friends with Gale and the rest of the Glory family and has a habit of laughing constantly. His parents were Shiba's good friends.

=== Georco ===
Georco (ジョーコ, Jōko) is the president of the dog racing track in Hip Hop Town, Georco possesses the Dark Bring Smoke Bay, enabling him to turn his body into smoke, and create a suffocating cloud of carbon monoxide. Haru was almost defeated by him in volume 2, but was defeated after Plue somehow managed to take his DB. In the manga, he is defeated the first Rave stone, but in the anime; it is the Ten Powers's first form. In the anime, it is hinted that Shuda had him killed after his defeat.

=== Go and Rosa ===
Go (ゴウ, Gō) and Rosa (ローザ, Rōza) are a couple who are involved in the film industry and former Demon Card members. Go is a movie director who uses a hammer combined with a Dark Bring that controls thunder. Rosa is an actress who uses a "Hunter Wolf" as a weapon which is a detachable sword that seeks their enemy and has a Dark Bring that makes men dance uncontrollably. Both of them appear during the final battle to help the Rave Warriors reach the star memory. In the Rave 0077 mini chapters it is revealed that they have a future daughter named Rose (ローズ, Rōzu) who is Levin Glory's romantic interest.

=== Hebi ===
Voiced by: Kousuke Okano (Japanese); Nicholas Guest (English)

Hebi (ヘビ) is Musica's right-hand man and second in command of the Silver-Rhythm gang, a motley crew of thieves and brigands, but are nonetheless loyal to Musica. He and the rest of the Silver-Rhythm gang occasionally join and help out Haru's group with their state-of-the-art air ship, the "Silver Knights" gained from ill-gotten wealth. He also knows a lot about animals. However, when questioned as to what Plue was, he was clueless and turned away. He has a tattoo on his head that says "snake". Hebi and the rest of the gang appear during the final fight to assist Haru and gang in reaching the Star Memory.

=== Jeid ===
Jeid (ジェイド, Jeido) is one of the four main generals in the Imperial Army and the older brother of Jegan of the Oracion Six. He convinces Jegan to live the right way and is distraught when the village they inhabit is destroyed and Jegan is killed attempting to protect the woman who saved him after his and let's battle. With that, he resolves to destroy Demon Card. He later assists the Rave Warriors in the final battle against Demon Card.

=== Jellybone ===
Jellybone (ジェリー・ボーン, Jerī Bōn) is a doctor who was the only person close to Belnika prior to meeting the Rave Warriors and looked after her during her Etherion experiments. After Hardner revealed his evil intentions to Belnika, he was taken hostage to force Belnika to cooperate with his plans.

=== Jiggle Butt Gang ===
Jiggle Butt Gang (ケツプリ団, Ketsupuri-dan; "Big Butt Bandits" in English dub) are three hopeless robbers who have absolutely no talent in robbing, they have comically large behinds which they jiggle when excited. Their leader, named Wonderful Gocch (ワンダフル・ゴッチ, Wandafuru Gotchi), has an affinity with Plue. In the Fairy Tail anime series, the Jiggle Butt Gang make appearances in the filler "Key of the Starry Sky arc". They also make a cameo appearance in Episode 37 of the anime series GetBackers without their trademark skintight suits and big butts as they wore Hawaiian collared suits and they are chasing Natsumi as a retrieval expert before they are later subdued by Kazuki Fuchouin with his strings to save Natsumi.

=== Lance ===
Lance (ランス, Ransu) is the Commander of the 17th unit of Demon Card soldiers, he wields the Beast Sword, forged by Galein Musica. It allows him to create illusions at his will. His Dark Bring (DB) allows him to make his illusions real. Somewhat of a psychopath, he captured Elie and injured Hamrio Musica in Volume 2, and was defeated by Haru in Volume 3. He was responsible for killing Musica's family.

=== Lazenby ===
Lazenby (レイゼンビー, Reizenbī) the White Flame was formerly a misguided member of the Imperial Guardians under Deep Snow. He wears a superhero mask and an accessory that makes him appear to have four arms and resembles the build of a typical superhero. He supports justice to his highest extent capable. When it comes to abilities, he can perform many white flame techniques and special punch moves. After being defeated by Shuda, he finds out that he was misguided by Demon Card to think the Rave Master is evil and becomes a comic ally to the Rave Warriors.

=== Levin Glory ===
Levin Glory (レビン・グローリー, Rebin Gurōrī) is the future son of Haru and Elie who looks a lot like them, he is featured in the Rave 0077 mini chapters of the manga. He is constantly left home alone and is often seen engaging in ridiculous antics with his babysitter Nakajima.

=== Nakajima ===
Voiced by: Kousuke Okano (Japanese); Randall Montgomery (English)

Nakajima (ナカジマ) is a strange lifeform that lives stuck to the outside wall of Cattleya and Haru's house. He looks like a flower, but claims that the petal-looking things ringing his round face are feathers. His favorite hobby is "golling".

=== Range and Sopra ===
Range (ランジュ, Ranju) and Sopra (ソプラ, Sopura) are two female members of Demon Card and are part of Reina's unit to help fight against the Onigami Forces. They later leave Demon Card and appear with many other allies of the Rave Warriors to help them get to Star Memory.

=== Rize ===
Rize (リゼ) is the man who taught Hamrio Musica Sliver-claiming. He was originally going to steal the Silver Ray because it was too dangerous to fall into the wrong hands but failed as someone already stole it before him. On his way back, he found and took Musica in after the rest of his family was slaughtered by Lance. Before he died from natural causes, Rize had Musica promise to destroy Silver Ray should he ever find it.

=== Roppen ===
Roppen (ロッペン) is a former Symphonian soldier who was under the command of Alpine. He wore leopard print armor. In the present his spirit lives in a leopard form and stays with Alpine at the shrine of the Rave of Truth.

=== Sakura Glory ===
Sakura Glory (サクラ・グローリー, Sakura Gurōrī) is the wife of Gale Glory and mother of Haru and Cattleya. After Gale departed from Garage Island to put an end to Demon Card, Sakura pursued him for one year before encountering him in a confrontation with King. However, she was murdered by King in front of her husband, as revenge for the deaths of his wife and child.

=== Unicorn Watanabe ===
Unicorn Watanabe (ユニコーン渡辺, Yunikōn Watanabe) called "Uni" (ユニー, Yunī) for short is a cook that formerly worked for the Onigami Forces. He seems to be a member of the same race as Griff but has a horn on his head that is identical to Plue's nose. He believes himself to be Plue's identical twin because of it despite resembling Griff more. He accompanies the Rave warriors while they fight the Onigami Forces and Doryu, after Doryu's defeat, he decides to stay with the mermaids.

== Antagonists ==
=== Demon Card ===
==== Gale Raregroove ====
Voiced by: Tesshō Genda (Japanese); Peter Lurie (English)

Gale Raregroove (ゲイル・レアグローブ, Geiru Reagurōbu), also known as King (キング, Kingu), is the initial ruler of Demon Card and a descendant to the former Raregroove kingdom. He founded Demon Card with Gale Glory but after Gale left due to their conflicting bloodlines, King became the sole leader. He quickly fell under the influence of the Dark Bring, whose power he used to strengthen the organization to become a powerful force for evil. Years later King is reported to the empire by Gale which causes his intentions misread and instead the empire commences a slaughter upon the forces of Demon Card, killing King's wife Emilia and presumably his son Lucia. King himself was taken into custody by the Empire but later broke out with the power of Dark Bring. In the present, Haru and Gale Glory fight King at the Tower of Din where the battle ends with King dying and Gale Glory dying in the aftermath of the fight. King is extremely strong and is often used as a reference to show the relative strength of other villains. Although he uses 5 dark bring, which is considered an extraordinary feat, he does not use any Sinclaire like the other main villains of the series. The fact he can still match them in combat is a testament to his strength. King's sword Decalogus is a dark bring which is the evil counterpart of the TCM. His Dark Bring, Black Zenith fires a huge black sphere that disintegrates anything that it touches. The Dark Bring, Gate which can open doors between worlds. King used this to summon his warriors, the 5 Palace Guardians, from the Mystic realm. Monster Prison is one of the "reverse" Dark Brings feared for their unchecked power, which seals the bearer's body and soul within it for all eternity, transforming them into a beast with just bestial instincts; in this form, he is immune to pain and can fire energy beams from the mouth. The last Dark Bring he possesses is Warp Road which has the power of teleportation which King used to extract the Dark Bring End of Earth from within Gale and teleport it to the distant Demon Card HQ, which was annihilated in the subsequent Overdrive.

==== Lucia Raregroove ====
Voiced by: Souichiro Hoshi (Japanese); Armando Valdes-Kennedy (English)

Lucia Raregroove (ルシア・レアグローブ, Rushia Reagurōbu) is the primary antagonist of the series. He is the son of King and was the heir to the throne of Demon Card and also the Raregroove Kingdom. During the Empire's infamous raid of Demon Card headquarters 10 years prior to the series present, Lucia was presumably killed in the slaughter along with his mother, Emilia. When he was seen to still be alive, he was imprisoned within the 66th basement of the maximum security desert prison Mega Unit where he became an infamous legend known among the Empire as the Blonde Demon, a boy whose power was so great and terrifying, he was a threat to the entire world. Sometime after the death of his father during the battle at the Tower of Din, he became powerful enough to violently break out of his imprisonment within Mega Unit. Much like Gale Glory and King were destined to oppose each other, Lucia is every bit the antithesis to the second Rave Master Haru Glory, as the self-proclaimed Dark Bring Master. Initially, he possessed Sinclair, the first piece of Endless, the mother of all Dark Brings, that was the main piece which has the power of creating a warped dimensional space that has enough pressure to annihilate anything. After having over 10 years of influence over him, Sinclair managed to bestow upon Lucia a high amount of superhuman strength, speed, stamina, endurance and durability as well as giving him knowledge. He also wields his father's former sword, Decalogue which has the same abilities as Haru's TCM. Although it was later destroyed by Haru and he received an enhanced version of it called Neo Decalogue where 10 Dark Brings were used to enhance all 10 swords.

==== Shakuma ====
Shakuma (シャクマ) is the most powerful mage in the world and Haja's master. He was recruited by Lucia to kidnap Elie to force her into becoming Lucia's bride. He is later revealed to be Shakuma Raregroove (シャクマ・レアグローブ, Shakuma Reagurōbu), the King of Raregroove, which makes him King's father and Lucia's grandfather. He was also the one who murdered the King of Symphonia, Haru's grandfather, in the past. He possessed high magical prowess, easily destroying a city with a high-level spell, killing all its inhabitants while searching for Ogre's piece of Sinclair. He was defeated by the power of Elie's Etherion. Before his death, he boasts that Lucia will rule all of time before he melts into a puddle. He had a solemn serious personality until after Elie hit him, when he reverted to a sadistic, disgusting old man.

==== Oracion Six ====
The Oracion Six (六祈将軍(オラシオンセイス), Orashion Seisu; lit. 'Oración Seis') are the six most powerful warriors and leaders in Demon Card. Shuda was originally one of the Oracion Six but after his defeat by Haru, he was replaced by Deep Snow. Quite possibly the Oracion Six's defining attribute, this set of special Dark Brings are considered to be the most powerful in the world, second only perhaps to the five pieces of the mother of all Dark Brings, Sinclair (which caused the Overdrive 50 years ago). The Six Star Dark Brings enable each member of the Oracion Six to bend a force of nature to their will. In Fairy Tail, the same concept was used to describe a dark guild composed of six powerful mages.

===== Haja =====
Haja (ハジャ) is the de facto leader of the Oracion Six and one of its most powerful members (second only to Berial, according to the author). He is one of the top mages in the world, second only perhaps to his master Shakuma (the world's greatest mage). His overwhelming might is primarily attributed to his ability to generate limitless quantities of mana, which gained him the title of "Haja the Infinite"; while this was seemingly a natural ability at first, it was later revealed to be derived from a Dark Bring implanted within him. Like the archmage Sieghart, he hails from the town of Mildian, the city of time. He was initially depicted as being one of Demon Card's most loyal members, but later events revealed him to be a highly devious and ambitious individual, who plotted to have the most powerful forces for both good and evil eliminated and coveted ultimate power to control the world and time itself. To that end, he returned to his hometown of Mildian to acquire the great power that dwelled beneath it, super magic Cronus, but was opposed and inevitably killed by Sieg, who was aided by the people of Mildian. It was revealed afterwards that Haja carried within him the essence of the Demon Card scientist Igor Kilkila, who was released after Haja was killed (Igor was subsequently defeated and imprisoned by Sieg and the people of Mildian).

===== Reina =====
Reina (レイナ) is a Silver Claimer, like Musica. She became a member of Demon Card to avenge the injustice done to her deceased father, as well as to find her father's greatest work, the ship Silver Ray, whose theft her father was unjustly accused of. She is initially spiteful towards Musica during their first encounter, as she believed his mentor Rize was the true culprit behind the Silver Ray's theft, and hence is privy to its location. She uses the Six Star Dark Bring White Kiss, which can create silver out of thin air and manipulate it to create silver weapons. In the battle against Ogre she teams up with Musica to defeat him. In this battle they use the Silver Bonds to defeat Ogre. She liked Musica and told him how she felt before destroying the Silver Ray. At the last moment, Reina pushed Musica off the Silver Ray and used Silver Bonds, causing an explosion in the sky. She died but her silver combined with Musica's and her soul merged with Musica's Silver Ray spear, which fell out of the heavens.

===== Jegan =====
Jegan (ジェガン) is a member of the Dragon Race in the Demon World, and the younger brother of Empire's Western General Jade. He is involved in a bitter feud with his former friend Let, because of Jegan's destruction of their home village and the massacre of their kind, in particular Julia, Let's girlfriend. In reality, however, Jegan faked Julia's death, and she became a full dragon who serves as his mindless companion and steed, after she purposely failed her dragon trial to spite him. He uses the "tree" Six Star Dark Bring Yggdrasil, which can absorb energy and manipulate plant life.

After his final battle and defeat at the hands of Let, Jegan realized that Julia still chose Let over him. Jegan would wash up on the beach of Wrist Dome, the Roofed City. He was found and then cared for by a girl named Janna, but by then he had lost all will to live. However, a conversation with his brother Jade, the Empire's Western General, caused him to rethink his decision and instead begin anew. Unfortunately, this was not to last, as the city is soon bombarded by meteors from space, courtesy of Shakuma and his apprentice Haja, who were out to retrieve the Sinclaire piece Last Physics and to eliminate Jegan for his failure and weakness. Jegan dies trying in vain to save Janna from the meteor shower, much to his brother Jade's grief and outrage.

===== Berial =====
Berial (ベリアル, Beriaru) is an archduke in the Demon World. A four-eyed demonic bat named Boi Boi often sits on his shoulder. He was the one who proposed to the Great Demon Lord Megido of the Lava and his peers for them to ally with Demon Card, as part of the organization's ambitious Project: Dark Rendezvous. He uses the Six Star Dark Bring G-Earth, which allows him to manipulate the ground. He appears again after The Blue Guardians are defeated and sends an army of insect monsters to kill Haru's friends while Haru was battling Shiba in his last trial. After Haru returns, he effortlessly kills Berial with a single hit.

===== Iulius =====
Iulius (ユリウス, Yuriusu) is an extremely vain individual, obsessed with beauty. He is arguably the weakest member of the Oracion Six, but can be considered dangerous in certain instances, particularly if his own beauty is threatened. Like Shuda, he was a villain in the beginning, but he was reformed to an extent and became an ally of Haru Glory and his friends. He loves dancing and his own beauty to the point that he's willing to betray Demon Card for them.

===== Deep Snow =====
Deep Snow (ディープスノー, Dīpu Sunō) is the Northern General of the Empire, but is in reality a double-agent working for Demon Card. He returned to the organization when Lucia became its new ruler, and was chosen as Shuda's replacement within the Oracion Six. He uses the "flow" Six Star Dark Bring Zero Stream, which allows him to control all that flows (water, wind, blood, etc.), and also has the Dark Bring Type 56 implanted within him when he was an infant, allowing him to tap into his latent power and enhance his physical abilities. He engages in an intense duel with Shuda but loses; however, Shuda lets him live and reveals that King had acted out of compassion for him, treating him like a son just as Snow had looked up to him like a father. His fate after the battle remains unknown.

=== Imperial Guardians ===
The Imperial Guardians (皇帝護衛部隊, Kōtei Goei Butai) are a set of four individuals that have served the late Imperial Headquarters. After the Imperial Headquarters was completely wiped out by Demon Card, these four imperial guardians joined Demon Card truly under Deep Snow because they had nothing better to do. Dalton (ダルトン, Daruton) the Chrysalis also known to be the weakest of the four is an insect like creature that has a body completely covered with armor. Dalton is usually seen flying due to his wings, and specializes in forming varied traps via his spider web like techniques. Moore (ムーア, Mūa) the Full Moon is a human who possesses extraordinary abilities with the chakram, which is the reason for his title. When it comes to appearance, Moore is seen wearing a hat that possesses many outer eyes and an overall clownish like garb. Golden-eye Brosnan (ブロスナン, Burosunan) who is easily seen as the largest of the four is a large monster like human that is seen wearing a giant suit of knight armor over his body and long golden hair who wields a great sword. Lazenby the White Flame was initially one of them and misdirected by Demon Card as well but after being knocked out ends up assisting the Rave Warriors for a while as a comedic ally.

Each of the Guardians is named after an actor who has portrayed James Bond on screen: Timothy Dalton, Roger Moore (who starred in Moonraker), Pierce Brosnan (who starred in GoldenEye), and George Lazenby.

=== Four Great Demon Lords ===
The four lords of the Demon World, the Four Great Demon Lords (四天魔王, Shitenmaō) were all recruited by Lucia for Demon Card's DR (Dark Rendezvous) plan. In a way, these four are the incarnation of the original demon guard of King, both of which were used to delay the heroes. Megido (メギド) is a massive humanoid lion, he was the first to join Lucia during the Dark Rendezvous recruiting process due to his desire to gain more power. He drives a flying coach, and breathes massive blasts of fire capable of damaging even Endless. He kills himself after being mortally wounded by Shuda, thinking that he'll take Shuda with him. Jiero (ジェロ, Jero) also known as Jiero of Despair is a Demon Goddess resembling a scantily-clad woman, and also said to be the former queen of the makai world. While human in appearance, her body is made of ice, allowing her to regenerate herself, and she controls magic and despair which somewhat fuels. She is killed by the combined effort of Julia, Belnika, and Niebel. This however results in the deaths of Niebel and Belnika, who are later revived by the Memory of the Star. Uta (ウタ) also called "Uta the Eternal", is a Demon War God used to defend Lucia as he prepared the second Overdrive. He was a human-like demon who possessed inhuman strength, wielding a hundred-foot longsword with incredible ease. He has a second form where 2 horns grow from his head, giving him increased combat abilities. He is killed by Let turning into his true Dragon King form, killing himself in the process before the Memory of the Star revives him as well. Asura (アスラ) also known as Asura of Darkness, while normally small and implike, it is merely to conceal his true form which is a gargantuan Satanic demon with a countless amount of Dark Bring embedded into its body. He has the ability to use any Dark Bring in the world and also can combine Dark Bring to produce effects. He is killed by the combined efforts of Plue and Haru.

=== Endless ===
Endless (エンドレス, Endoresu), also known as the King of Star Memory, is a monstrous entity born as the result of the alternate timeline, in which history was reconstructed to ensure the survival of mankind. Endless gains power through the accumulation of negative emotions, making its growth virtually unstoppable. Its infinite power is capable of eradicating dimensions. However, it can be destroyed by the power of Etherion, and summoned by the staff of Resha Valentine or assembly of the five Sinclaires. Endless is later revealed to be a dark bring itself, or the true origin of all dark brings, with its real appearance being a black orb made from the five Mother Dark Brings. Endless is used by Lucia Raregroove in an attempt to restore the original timeline, but is ultimately destroyed by Elie's Etherion.

=== Five Palace Guardians ===
The Five Palace Guardians (王宮守五神, Ōkyōmori Gokami) are five warriors from other dimensions, brought together by one of King's Dark Brings, the Gate. They guard the Tower of Din as well as being non-humans of unparalleled strength. The leader and most powerful of the guardians is Ltiangle (ルチアングル, Ruchianguru) with his Dark Bring, "Transparent", which allows him to turn objects as well as himself invisible. He also has a power unrelated to his Dark Bring that enables him to seal opponents within the landscape of their memories. Rionette (リオネット, Rionetto) is recognizable due to his tallness, long neck, and penchant for speaking in rhyme. Despite these oddities, Rionette is easily the most sadistic of the group; using his Dark Bring, "Shadow Doll", to warp to wherever his opponent's shadow is and render them unable to move by standing on it. Racas (ラカス, Rakasu) is a yellow demonoid with horseshoe-shaped hair that carries a pair of maracas and is constantly seeking the approval of Ltiangle. He cannot help dancing and his Dark Bring, "Rhythm Counter", allows him to reflect attacks back at the sender but with far greater power. He can also possess the ability to read the thoughts of others. Ron Glace (ロン・グラッセ, Ron Gurasse) is the largest, but also the weakest and dumbest member of the Palace Guardians. Despite being a massive suit of armor, Ron is a coward at heart and fights with underhanded tactics. His main weapons are a huge shield and spear, the latter of which he uses as a medium for his Dark Bring, "Spikes", that allows him to generate metal spikes from directly beneath his opponent(s) feet whenever he stabs the ground. Let Dahaka was initially the second most powerful of the Palace Guardians but, after his defeat to Haru, later changes his ways and becomes a central ally and good friend to the Rave Warriors.

Like several villains leading up to them, their names are in reference to something (or someone) in real life if you add the word "ma" to the beginning of their name. This is also a play on the fact that they're all Majin ("Ma" meaning demon and "jin" denoting a person. Translated as "demonoid" in the English manga). All their names origins are maltiangle (Ltiangle), marionette (Rionette), maracas (Racas), Marron glacé (Ron Glace), and mallet (Let). According to the author, Ltiangle was the hardest character to draw in the entire series due to his detailed armor and tower shaped head.

=== Blue Guardians ===
The Blue Guardians (ブルーガーディアンズ, Burū Gādianzu) are an organization of sky pirates who are just as powerful as Demon Card and even form an alliance with them. They are led by Captain Hardner and travel in the giant flying ship Albatross and therefore, they have no permanent base. The first mate, Lunar (ルナール, Renāru; "Renard") is exceptionally loyal to Hardner has dark skin and wields an enormous axe. Her Dark Bring allows her to change into Light granting her possibly light speed.

Among the Blue Guardians are their elite force known as Six Guard (六つの盾(シックス・ガード), Shikkusu Gādo) that is said to match Demon Card's Oracion Six. Lukan (ルカン, Rukan; "Requin"), the leader of the Six Guard has short, dark hair with a symbol tattooed onto his head has some alligator-looking animal skin over his head and a long cape. His Dark Bring allows him to change into acid and burn enemies who come into contact with him, granting him virtual immunity to physical attacks and also wields a scythe shaped like an anchor for armed combat. Koala (コアラ, Koara) is a small koala looking guy with extremely long sleeves who says "yes" at the end of all of his sentences and is also a sadist. He has his Dark Bring hanging around his neck which allows him to create and modify machinery. He has many machine types such that if one gets destroyed it rebuilds into a stronger one. Giraffe (ジラフ, Jirafu; "Girafe"), bears a slight resemblance to Elvis and has a similar haircut and wears giraffe-patterned pants while he also says things like "lame-o" and "daddy-o" like a jazz poet. His Dark Bring allows him to twist any object that he touches, no matter how hard. Leopard (レオパール, Reopāru; "Léopard"), the only female member in the Six Guard, bears a slight resemblance to a leopard. Her Dark Bring allows her to wear anything as an armor, including wind which grants her increased speed and agility, bullets, Julia's fire breath, electricity, and metal (which she considers her strongest form and only uses on people she hates). Reevil (リエーヴル, Riēvuru; "Lièvre"), the largest member is perverted and looks like a large mustachioed bunny with a wrestling outfit. His Dark Bring allows him to blow things away, but it also tears things apart and is incredibly smelly. Sean Vivera (シアン・ヴィヴェラン, Shian Viveran; "Chien Viverrin"), the first Blue Guardian to be introduced, and a rather fat member who totes a giant club and has bags under his eyes and wears something that resembles a leaf on his head. His Dark Bring allows him to put people to sleep, leaving them at the mercy of his attacks. He can also put himself to sleep to awaken a fighting technique that makes him even stronger.

==== Captain Hardner ====
Captain Hardner (ハードナー, Hādonā) is the leader of the Blue Guardians. He was recruited by Iulius for Demon Card's DR (Dark Rendezvous) plan. His Mother DB Anastasia allows him to "restore" anything, including his missing arm, ruined buildings that had long since been leveled, the atmosphere after Haru tried a smoke screen, and all his opponents old wounds which they have ever suffered and is usually fatal (although it appears he has to touch the subject). He also carries a sword with a blunted tip since he prefers to slash off heads instead of stabbing people, thus earning the nickname "Executioner".
He aims to merge with Endless, to forget the incident that killed all of his comrades, wife, and unborn child, which made him and his best friend the only survivors. Unknown to him, his unborn child was alive and raised up by his best friend. Hardner also tried all means to torture his daughter to reveal the hideout of which hid an ancient staff deep underground. Realizing what he had done to his own flesh and blood, Hardner broke down in defeat as Haru spares him, only to be stabbed in the back by Lucia to retrieve the mother DB piece in volume 28. It is later revealed he survived the attack.

=== Doryu Ghost Squad ===
The Doryu Ghost Squad (ドリュー幽撃団, Doryū Yūgekidan; "Doryu Raid Squad" in English dub), is a criminal organization led by Pumpkin Doryu consisting of Halloween themed monsters. When Demon Card briefly disbanded after King's defeat, they were one of the several smaller groups that emerged in an attempt to take the top spot in the criminal underworld. They become Haru's new nemesis while on his way to Symphonia and later after allying with the Onigami Forces, battle the Rave Warriors at Southernberg. Franken Billy (フランケン・ビリー, Furanken Birī), a Frankenstein-esque member, wields a dark bring, called Giant which allows him to enlarge his arms at will. Lilith (リリス, Ririsu) is a presumably young woman with a slight resemblance to Medusa and uses the Dark Bring North Wind which enables her to manipulate and become physically one with the wind. It also allows her to breathe in and move freely through large bodies of water. She is exceptionally glib with her tongue and does not hesitate to lie to get her way and Ruby remarked that she always bullied him. Mummy (マミー, Mamī) is a corrupt scientist with an affinity for werewolves as he created a breed of bipedal wolves with three eyes and machine guns imbued into their right arms. Mummy also turned the defeated Musica into a powerful lycanthropic creature and sent the beast against the Rave warriors, but Haru returned Musica to his normal state. Mummy also possesses a reversal dark bring, Bone Knight (a dark bring that throws away the wielder's soul to transform them, similar to King's Monster Prison). Cookie (クッキー, Kukkī) was a mass murderer executed by the Empire fifteen years ago because of his crimes but was brought back as a zombie by Doryu's use of Necromancy. His dark bring, All Crush, allowed him to automatically destroy anything that he touches or what touches him. Orochi (オロチ) was the most powerful member of the Doryu Ghost Squad but was killed very quickly by Jegan's Dark Bring, Yggdrasil.

==== Pumpkin Doryu ====
Pumpkin Doryu (パンプキン・ドリュー, Panpukin Doryū) is the founder of the Doryu Ghost Squad and holder of its top position. He holds one of the five mother DB, Vampire, which gives him complete control over the forces of gravity and repulsion which enables him, at its most extreme, to pull physical matter into darkness (which he did to Musica). He first fought Haru in Volume 15, and he nearly killed Haru with the Twilight sword. The second time they fought in Volume 17, Haru seemed to have gained some new strength (he may have grown stronger as a result to losing the first match), and he destroyed the Twilight sword and the Jet Black sword. Haru also received some help from his friends, but it ended up being a one on one fight between Haru and Doryu. Haru was able to overcome the pain of his earlier injuries, destroyed Doryu's most powerful spell (which would have killed Haru and all of his friends), broke through the Vampire's power of repulsion, and he killed Doryu with the Million Suns. After this point, Haru was stronger than Doryu. Haru nearly died after using all his power to defeat Doryu, but he was saved by Dalmatian in Volume 18. He's voiced by Koji Ishii in some video games.

=== Onigami ===
Onigami (鬼神) is made up of a large amount of onis (similar to demonoids, but more humanlike) led by Ogre, they sided with the Doryu Ghost Attack Squad to pose a threat to the newly reformed Demon Card. Their leader Ogre (オウガ, Ōga) is a brutish oni with a notable lust for women. He possesses the Last Physics one of the mother DB which grants him immunity to physical attacks and most magic which operates in the physical dimension. Ogre is also a "Gold-Claimer" which is a more advanced technique than the silver claiming done by Musica and Reina. It was revealed that he was the one who stole the Silver Ray. Ogre is voiced by Hiroshi Matsumoto in some video games. Gobu (ゴブ) is Ogre's right hand Onigami ally and the chief of maintenance and technology. He uses the Sky High dark bring which grants him telekinetic control to any surrounding weapons. Gok (ゴッコ, Gokko) is the Onigami Gunnery Chief who has the "Through the Wall" dark bring which allows him to transport through walls. Yanma (ヤンマ), the Onigami Chief Engineer who uses the all-seeing Double Vista dark bring which are in the form of glasses and can see through anything. Gawara (ガワラ) is the leader over the Onigami Raiding Party who uses the Stone Roses dark bring which turns anything it touches into stone. Initially, their cook was Unicorn Watanabe, the same species as Griffon Kato, but he later joined the Rave Warriors.
