= Acoustics (Floater album) =

Studio album by Floater
- Released: August 3, 2004
- Recorded: ??
- Genre: Rock
- Length: 66:23
- Label: Elemental Records
- Producer: Diogenes Alexander Xenos

Floater chronology
Alter (2002)	Acoustics (2004)	Stone by Stone (2006)

Acoustics is the sixth studio album by American rock band Floater, released on August 3, 2004, and consisting entirely of original acoustic songs. Drummer Peter Cornett sang lead vocals on Invisible, which also featured guitarist Dave Amador on trumpet.

== Track listing ==
1. "On the Table" – 3:33
2. "Lost Patience" – 2:11
3. "Time Marches On" – 4:27
4. "Out of Sight" – 4:27
5. "Hard Parting" – 1:36
6. "The Golden Age" – 2:40
7. "Accepted" – 2:47
8. "Invisible" – 1:55
9. "Bound for Glory" – 3:52
10. "Strychnine" – 3:46
11. "The Misfit's Song" – 4:42
12. "Evangeline" – 4:01
