= Wake (Floater album) =

Studio album by Floater
- Released: 2010
- Genre: Rock
- Label: Typhon Records
- Producer: Diogenes Alexander Xenos, Robert Wynia

Floater chronology
Stone by Stone (2006)	Wake (2010)	The Thief (2018)

Wake is the eighth studio by American rock band Floater, released in June 2010. Some of the tracks on this album ("Leave a Light On", "Wondering" and "White Dress") were also recorded during the studio sessions for previous album Stone by Stone. It is Floater's first self-financed and self-released album.

== Track listing ==
1. "Concentrate"
2. "Cannonball"
3. "Wondering"
4. "Broken Toy"
5. "Simplest Way of Life"
6. "White Dress"
7. "Matadors"
8. "Leave a Light On"
9. "Enough"
10. "You Taught Me"
11. "Killing Time"
12. "Let it Go"
