= Otome Yōkai Zakuro =

Japanese manga series

- First volume cover

おとめ妖怪 ざくろ
- Genre: Historical, supernatural
- Manga
- Written by: Lily Hoshino
- Published by: Gentosha
- Magazine: Comic Birz
- Original run: November 30, 2006 – present
- Volumes: 10
- Anime television series
- Directed by: Chiaki Kon
- Written by: Mari Okada
- Studio: J.C.Staff
- Licensed by: NA: NIS America
- Original network: TV Tokyo
- Original run: October 5, 2010 – December 28, 2010
- Episodes: 13

Otome Yōkai Zakuro (おとめ妖怪 ざくろ; lit. "Maiden Spirit Zakuro") is a Japanese manga series written and illustrated by Lily Hoshino. It has been serialized in Gentosha's seinen manga magazine Comic Birz since November 2006; its chapters have been collected in ten tankōbon volumes as of March 2015. The series was put on hiatus in October 2016 and resumed in January 2024. A 13-episode anime television series adaptation produced by J.C.Staff and directed by Chiaki Kon aired from October to December 2010.

== Plot ==
During the Westernization of an alternate Japan, humans and spirits coexist. To maintain harmony between the two, the Ministry of Spirits is established and humans and spirit representatives are chosen. Lieutenants Kei Agemaki, Riken Yoshinokazura, and Ganryu Hanakiri are chosen to be the human representatives and are partnered with Zakuro, Susukihotaru, and Bonbori and Hozuki, respectively. However, Zakuro cannot stand humans who accept Jesuit practices so easily and Agemaki has a severe fear of spirits.

== Characters ==
=== Main characters ===
Zakuro (西王母桃)
Voiced by: Mai Nakahara
Zakuro is an impulsive and assertive half-spirit girl who looks like a beautiful girl with fox ears atop her head. She is chosen to be a spirit representative in the Ministry of Spirit Affairs. However, she is opposed to the idea of forming the Ministry and believes that allowing humans and their Jesuit ideas into the manor is disgusting. Despite this, she becomes smitten with Agemaki Kei shortly after the two are partnered. Once she learns that he is afraid of spirits, her opinion of him is greatly diminished and she constantly calls him a coward. She dislikes how easily humans accept Westernization and hates the changes it brings, such as drinking milk, as a result. Zakuro is upset by how spirits are being driven out of their homes because of Westernization when humans had respected the spirits in the past. It is revealed that when pregnant human girls are spirited away, they return carrying half-spirit infants. The girls, said to be possessed by fox spirits, are shunned and are immediately taken away or killed at birth. Zakuro's mother, Tsukuhane, was spirited away twice, once before Zakuro was born and again when Zakuro was older. Zakuro's mother never returned the second time. Because of this, Zakuro passionately investigates cases where girls have been spirited away, hoping that she can learn something about her mother. In addition, Kushimatsu states that because Zakuro was shunned at birth, she is seeking acceptance from Agemaki, whom she trusts. As the series progress she falls in love with Kei but doesn't know how to express her feelings. When she fights spirits, Mamezo provides her with a branch of cherry blossoms that turns into a knife.
Kei Agemaki (総角 景, Agemaki Kei)
Voiced by: Takahiro Sakurai
Agemaki is a second lieutenant in the imperial army. He is chosen to be a human representative in the Ministry of Spirit Affairs and is partnered with Zakuro. However, he has a severe fear of spirits and a fear of heights. He tries to hide the fact that he is afraid of spirits because of what his father might say about it. When Agemaki expressed his fear of spirits as a child, his father yelled at him. In addition, shortly after seeing a spirit, he learned that his cat Itsue disappeared, leading Agemaki to believe that the spirit caused Itsue's disappearance. It is also alluded to that his mother and sister have some kind of spiritual power (or possibly being spirits themselves) since they can see spirits that humans do not and Kei's mother knew that Zakuro was a half-spirit even though she hid her ears. At the start of the series, he panics upon seeing full-blooded spirits, such as Amaryōju and Mamezo, and becomes so afraid, he asks Zakuro, who is easier to accept because of her more human appearance, to accompany him to the outhouse. Afterward, he makes an effort to understand Zakuro and other spirits, although this causes him to make the wrong conclusions, like offering the half-fox spirit Zakuro a candle to eat when he does not realize fox spirits do not actually eat candles. As the series progress he begins to fall in love with Zakuro and even confessed to her in the last episode. He begins to accepts spirits and is later able to play with Sakura and Kiri even though they scared him at the beginning of the series.
Susukihotaru (薄蛍)
Voiced by: Kana Hanazawa
Susukihotaru is a beautiful and shy half-spirit girl. She is chosen to be a spirit representative in the Ministry of Spirit Affairs and is partnered with Yoshinokazura Riken. Initially, she wants to be partnered with someone else, as she thought Yoshinokazura is big and scary. Upon hearing this, he crouches down and asks her if he is still scary. After this, their relationship greatly improves. When Susukihotaru was first brought to the manor by Kushimatsu, Susukihotaru did not have the power to fight, but once she met Zakuro she realized the spiritual power she possessed. Because of this, Zakuro means the world to her. Susukihotaru is able to empathize with objects and other people through physical contact. When she is possessed by a sword, she cuts Yoshinokazura's hand and can sense his concern for her. She feels that she is undeserving of this concern. When she learns that he appreciates her ability to know what he is feeling, she tells him that she hopes he knows what she is feeling too. She looks at the ground when surrounded by people because she is afraid to look humans in the eye, but she later says that she is no longer bothered by the people around her because she is with Yoshinokazura. When Zakuro fights, Susukihotaru assists her by singing and waving a branch of cherry blossoms provided by Sakura and Kiri.
Riken Yoshinokazura (芳野葛 利剱, Yoshinokazura Riken)
Voiced by: Satoshi Hino
Riken is a straight-faced and stoic second lieutenant in the imperial army. He is chosen to be a human representative in the Ministry of Spirit Affairs and is paired with Susukihotaru. When he overhears that she is afraid of him because of his height, he crouches down and asks her if he is still scary. After this, their relationship greatly improved. He cares for Susukihotaru greatly, and she senses this when she injures his hand while she is possessed by a sword. He describes himself as a man of few words and does not have a problem with Susukihotaru reading his emotions.
Bonbori (雪洞) and Hozuki (鬼灯, Hōzuki)
Voiced by: Aki Toyosaki, (Bonbori), Yui Horie (Hozuki)
Bonbori and Hozuki are beautiful and cheerful half-spirit girls. They are chosen as spirit representatives in the Ministry of Spirit Affairs and are partnered with Hanakiri Ganryu. They think the idea of a Ministry of Spirit Affairs sounds like fun and are delighted to be working with humans. They immediately take a liking to Hanakiri and tease him about many things he says. They become extremely excited and happy when they learn Hanakiri can tell them apart despite the fact that they are exactly identical except for their voices. When Zakuro fights, they assist by singing and waving a branch of cherry blossoms provided by Sakura and Kiri.
Bonbori and Hozuki specialize in magic petals, which they attach to people and use to sense the presence of that person. However, the petals only work when one of the twins is singing. When a petal is destroyed, the singing twin is injured because they put part of their soul into the petals.
When they were children, the twins lived alone is a dark cave. From time to time, a woman would bring them food and clothing. She called them Bonbori and Hozuki and told them to stay in the cave during the day and to never approach any other humans. They obeyed and only went outside at night, playing and searching for fruit and roots to eat. One day, the woman stopped coming, and they searched for her every night. They did not find her, but they found something they never saw before, other humans. One of the humans, upon hearing them mention the woman, blamed Bonbori and Hozuki for his wife's death. In his rant, it's revealed that the woman visiting them was their mother, but they themselves do not seem to be aware of this. The pair tried to run away and soon found themselves on Kushimatsu's back.
Ganryu Hanakiri (花桐 丸竜, Hanakiri Ganryū)
Voiced by: Yūki Kaji
Ganryu is a proud second lieutenant in the imperial army. He is chosen to be a human representative in the Ministry of Spirit Affairs and is partnered with Bonbori and Hozuki. He is able to tell the twins apart while they were trying to confuse him despite the fact that they are exactly identical except for their voices. It's indicated that for his age, he is advanced in terms of intelligence and skill.
Mamezo (豆蔵, Mamezō)
Voiced by: Nobuhiko Okamoto
Zakuro's artifact spirit who appears as a sandy colored rabbit with fangs. He is able to talk. However, when Bonbori and Hozuki first arrived at the house, he only repeated everything he heard. When Zakuro refuses to work with Agemaki, Mamezo acts as Agemaki's partner instead. Mamezo provides Zakuro a branch of cherry blossoms which can be used as a knife by pulling one out of his mouth.
Kushimatsu (櫛松)
Voiced by: Kazue Komiya
Kushimatsu is a full-blooded fox spirit, with a head resembling a cartoonish weasel, that receives cases from those seeking aid from the Ministry of Spirit Affairs. She is also the one who brought Bonbori, Hozuki, Suskihotaru, and Zakuro from different regions to live together and takes care of them.
Amaryoju (雨竜寿, Amaryōju)
Voiced by: Akihiko Ishizumi
Amaryoju is a spirit who is similar to a baku. He chose Zakuro, Susukihotaru, Bonbori and Hozuki as representatives for the spirits because they are half-spirits who are neither human nor spirit.
Sakura (桜) and Kiri (桐)
Voiced by: Yuka Iguchi (Sakura), Mutsumi Tamura (Kiri)
Sakura and Kiri are playful pumpkin-headed spirits. They are extremely small in size. They provide Susukihotaru, Bonbori, and Hozuki branches of cherry blossoms which are used as weapons by pulling the branches out of their mouths.

=== Antagonists ===
Takatoshi Hanadate (花楯 鷹敏, Hanadate Takatoshi)
Voiced by: Takayuki Kondō
Hanadate is a lieutenant. He assists the Ministry of Spirit Affairs on their first assignment by compromising between the client and the Ministry. Zakuro is smitten with him after, and she tries to make a good impression on him and appears to take a great interest in her appearance during times when he visits. It is revealed that his name Hanadate is a fake, with his real name being Omodaka. While using his real persona, he is seen wearing a yukata and a mask. He is manipulating the twins, Rangui, and the Ministry of Spirit Affairs for his own agenda, which involves Zakuro, whom he claims is perfect to "bear his child". For this reason he is obsessed with her to the point of harassing Byakuroku sexually after she was given some of Zakuro's powers, and eventually mistreats Rangui despite her crush on him.
It is later shown that lieutenant Hanadate is, in fact, Zakuro's older half brother. He is indirectly the reason Zakuro's father is dead, since when looking for his mother he witnessed Enaga (Zakuro's father) and Tsukuhane kissing and told his father which made his father furious. He would not even allow his mother to speak his name when she called to him. He kept telling her that she had no right to use his name, for she was a disgrace in his eyes, and his father's eyes. However, this was due to his want for his mother's attention, his jealousy of Enaga, and his lonely upbringing.
Daidai (橙橙) and Byakuroku (百緑)
Voiced by: Minako Kotobuki (Daidai), Haruka Tomatsu (Byakuroku)
Daidai and Byakuroku are sisters who serve under Rangui. In the military gala case they helped Rangui to stop the Ministry of Spirit Affairs members from interfering with her plans, and in episode 8 they capture Suskihotaru and Agemaki and locked them in an earthen cellar to lure Zakuro to a trap. They envy Zakuro for growing up in a happy home, having people to love and protect, and they envy her freedom.
Byakuroku and Daidai work as servants in the Village of the Oracles, where Byakuroku makes great efforts and overworks her body's resistance so she can protect her younger sister Daidai, who is more ignorant of the fact that they are being used and harbors some jealousy of what she thinks is favoritism of her older sister.
Rangui (乱杭)
Voiced by: Kikuko Inoue
Rangui is one of the main villains of the series who keeps targeting Zakuro. The sisters Daidai and Byakuroku serve her. Rangui thinks Daidai is just a dirty little half-spirit and a failure, but Rangui told Byakuroku that as long as she continues to serve her then Daidai will be treated the same way Byakuroku is. Rangui is able to use sorcery through paper, and is capable of transforming into a large and hideous spider-like monster. It is shown that Rangui has feelings for lieutenant Hanadate, but she soon learns that Hanadate is only using her to get what he wants. He wants Zakuro to bear his child, and when Rangui learns this she is furious and attacks Zakuro.

== Media ==
=== Manga ===
Written and illustrated by Lily Hoshino, Otome Yōkai Zakuro started in Gentosha's seinen manga magazine Comic Birz on November 30, 2006. The author announced in October 2016 that she was putting all her manga on hiatus to take care of her newborn son. The series resumed serialization on the Comic Boost website on January 26, 2024. Gentosha has collected its chapters into individual tankōbon volumes, with the first one released on January 24, 2008; as of March 24, 2015, ten volumes have been released.

==== Volumes ====
No.	Japanese release date	Japanese ISBN
01	January 24, 2008	978-4-344-81187-4
Chapters 1 - 7
02	September 24, 2008	978-4-344-81411-0
03	April 24, 2009	978-4-344-81622-0
04	March 24, 2010	978-4-344-81907-8
05	September 24, 2010	978-4-344-82037-1
06	July 23, 2011	978-4-344-82263-4
07	April 24, 2012	978-4-344-82458-4
08	March 23, 2013	978-4-344-82761-5
09	March 24, 2014	978-4-344-83010-3
10	March 24, 2015	978-4-344-83290-9

=== Anime ===
An anime television series adaptation, produced by J.C.Staff and directed by Chiaki Kon, aired on TV Tokyo from October 5 to December 28, 2010. The opening theme song is "Moon Signal", performed by Sphere.

The series was simulcast by Crunchyroll. NIS America licensed the series in North America and released it on DVD on June 12, 2012.

==== Episodes ====
No.	Title	Original release date
1	"Prepare to Be Bewitched"; Transliteration: "Iza, Yōyō to" (Japanese: いざ、妖々と)	October 5, 2010
During the Westernization of an alternate Japan, humans and spirits coexist. However, some spirits have been causing trouble, and the Ministry of Spirit Affairs is established to maintain harmony. Lieutenants Kei Agemaki, Riken Yoshinokazura, and Ganryu Hanakiri are chosen to represent the humans. They are introduced to their female half-spirit partners: Zakuro, Susukihotaru, and twins Bonbori and Hozuki, respectively. While Susukihotaru, Bonbori, and Hozuki are delighted, Zakuro is disgusted with humans and their acceptance of Jesuit ideas. However, she becomes smitten with Agemaki. Shortly after, spirits Sakura and Kiri play around Agemaki, who immediately becomes nauseous and faints. In private, Yoshinokazura advises Agemaki against working with spirits as Agemaki's fear of spirits is severe. Agemaki believes that he has no alternative because of what his father might say. That night, Agemaki walks through the manor and is frightened by the spirits. He runs into Zakuro and hugs her. She interprets this as a romantic gesture. However, he asks her to accompany him to the outhouse because he is too scared to go alone. She becomes angry and wonders how she became smitten with a coward. In the morning, the representatives attend a flower viewing. While they are walking, a crowd stares at the spirits and whispers behind their backs. Zakuro points out that they are used to this and tells Agemaki that he is no different from the crowd. Lightning strikes the ground, and the lightning beast Raiju appears. Because Raiju is well-behaved, the spirits are unconcerned. However, Raiju attacks. Agemaki rescues Sakura and Kiri, but is too frightened to run away. The girls fight and return Raiju to a calm state. As the representatives continue their party, the spirits wonder why Raiju lost control.
2	"Crimson Brilliance"; Transliteration: "Aka, Kōkō to" (Japanese: あか、煌々と)	October 12, 2010
Zakuro has a dream that she is climbing a persimmon tree. When she picks the fruit, the tree is surrounded by spirits and she falls into a pool. Her mother's voice tells her that she should not climb persimmon trees because they are connected to the underworld. At breakfast, Agemaki offers Zakuro a candle to eat, believing that fox spirits eat candles, however, this enrages Zakuro and she leaves. Agemaki tells Kushimatsu that he was researching spirits because he wanted to understand Zakuro so he could help her as a partner. The representatives are sent to investigate a hotel construction site. However, construction has stopped because a spirit is scaring the workers. Although talking to the spirit is sufficient, the hotel's owner requests that the spirit be exterminated. Reluctantly, they begin searching for the spirit. However, Zakuro leaves Agemaki by himself. While looking for Zakuro, Agemaki runs into a large, shadow-like spirit. It attacks him, but stops short when it sees he is afraid. The other representatives arrive and pursue the spirit. Zakuro tells the spirit that she wants to talk. However, it does not cooperate. Zakuro slices the column, causing the hotel to collapse. Outside, Zakuro explains that the spirit's true, small form is revealed with light. Because of Westernization, the area is illuminated at night. In addition, the spirit's shrine was destroyed by the construction, so it tried to scare the humans away. She laments the loss of human respect for spirits. However, the hotel's owner is upset that the spirit was not exterminated and his hotel is ruined. To compromise, Lieutenant Hanadate offers to restore the shrine and have the hotel built on military land. He thanks a smitten Zakuro for reminding him to remember the important things.
3	"Tragic Past"; Transliteration: "Kako, Aiai to" (Japanese: かこ、哀々と)	October 19, 2010
Zakuro and Agemaki are left alone in the house while the others are out on investigations, and because of this Zakuro is bored and irritated. Before too long, a client comes to see Kushimatsu about a job that he wants done. Zakuro jumps at the chance of taking the case because it is about girls that have been spirited away. Though she is reluctant, Kushimatsu allows Zakuro and Agemaki to take the case of the client's village. Before they leave, Kushimatsu lets Agemaki know why Zakuro is so impatient about the case by telling him about how half-spirits are born and the connection to Zakuro. During the investigation, Zakuro begins to hear voices calling her and realizes that this is the same voice that lured the girl away from the village to be spirited away. That night, Zakuro and Agemaki are asked to sleep in the same room, and unlike Agemaki, Zakuro is surprised an embarrassed by the idea. When they finally settle down to sleep, Zakuro asks why Agemaki has been so cautious around her and Agemaki tells her about what Kushimatsu told him. Zakuro tells him about her mother and why she cannot let these kinds of cases go. As they sleep Agemaki is awakened by Zakuro leaving the room. He realizes that she is unconscious and is being led by the voice so he follows her. When she finally awakens, they are in front of a dark cave where a demon resides. They find out that the girls are not being spirited away, but being eaten by the demon. Zakuro defeats the demon and they both leave the cave by morning. Agemaki starts to feel guilty about having her always save him from the demons and Zakuro quietly disagrees with him.
4	"Timid Distance"; Transliteration: "Kyori, Kowagowa to" (Japanese: きょり、怖々と)	October 26, 2010
Yoshinokazura, Susukihotaru, Hanakiri, Bonbori and Hozuki investigate about a sword in Aya Orikata's possession. Orikata explains that a customer obtained it through "a secret channel" and later noticed everyone around her met with unfortunate events. She gave the sword to Orikata, who refuses to sell it. When Orikata shows them the sword, Susukihotaru begins to breathe heavily and sweat. Afterwards, Hanakiri, Bonbori and Hozuki try to locate the customer and leave Yoshinokazura and Susukihotaru to take the sword home. The twins believe the sword was affecting Susukihotaru because she can empathize with objects and other people. At the shop, Mugi, a spirit working for Orikata, shows Susukihotaru a comb. Susukihotaru touches it and sees Mugi and her mother attacked by a swordsman. Susukihotaru learns Mugi does not remember this and tells Mugi that her mother will come if she is good. When Yoshinokazura asks Susukihotaru how she knew Mugi's mother, Susukihotaru admits that she was hiding something for fear of what he might say. Before she can elaborate, Mugi falls trying to take the sword off of a dresser. The sword falls into Susukihotaru's hands, and she sees the sword killing spirits. She draws the sword and attacks. As Orikata protects Mugi, Mugi remembers her mother dying. Yoshikazura catches the blade and cuts his hand, causing Susukihotaru to regain control. Later, Susukihotaru says she does not deserve the concern Yoshinokazura has for her. He realizes her ability to empathize, and tells her that because he does not say much, he appreciates her knowing what he is feeling. She cries and tells him that she hopes he knows what she is feeling. Hanakiri and the twins return unsuccessful, and the group leaves for home. That night, Kushimatsu and Amaryoju wonder if the incident was a coincidence or orchestrated.
5	"Sticky Trap"; Transliteration: "Wana, Nebaneba to" (Japanese: わな、粘々と)	November 2, 2010
Soldiers have been lured away by a beautiful woman who transforms into a spider and kills them, earning her the nickname the Black Widow. Hanadate requests that representatives attend that night's military gala and pinpoint the killer. At the gala, the representatives pair off and split up. Hanadate immediately asks Zakuro to dance with him, telling her that it will be easier to watch the women while dancing. On the balcony, Agemaki tries to hide his jealousy while the twins attach magical petals to the women. They explain that they can sense the presence of anyone a petal is attached to when a twin is singing. When the dance is over, Zakuro is left by herself. She is approached by two soldiers who wish to touch her ears. Although she protests, they tell her that causing a scene will hurt the reputation of the Ministry of Spirit Affairs. Before the soldiers can touch her ears, Agemaki intervenes. As Zakuro cries, Agemaki tries to comfort her. The twins notice that Hanadate is leaving the ballroom with a mysterious woman. Shortly after, a petal has been destroyed. Hanakiri and the twins track the destroyed petal and discover Hanadate is trapped in a giant web. The other representatives are confronted by a pair of cloaked figures, but the figures are quickly overpowered. The Black Widow attacks Hanakiri and the twins with her spider form. Hozuki protects Hanakiri while Bonbori fights. However, the twins are only at half of their power when separated, and Bonbori is easily defeated. Before the Black Widow kills her, Zakuro arrives and stabs the Black Widow, who reverts to her human form. The Black Widow tells Zakuro that everything will be explained soon and reveals that she knows Zakuro's mother. Before Zakuro can question her, the Black Widow disappears.
6	"Onward Together"; Transliteration: "Yukite, Kotogoto to" (Japanese: ゆきて、事々と)	November 9, 2010
Zakuro asks Kushimatsu about her mother, but is told that she will not know about her mother until the time is right. Susukihotaru tells Agemaki about how Zakuro and the others met, and how she looked at them when they first met. After that Agemaki asks if he could go to her room. She thinks it's just so he can look at a girl's room, but he actually wants to get to the kite stuck on the tree near her window that he could not reach earlier. Zakuro asks why he did not climb the tree, and he tells her that he is afraid of heights. She climbs up the tree and grabs the kite, then suddenly hears her mother's voice, causing her to climb higher until she fell. She breaks the pendant her mother gave her, so Agemaki fixes it. When he puts it on her, Susukihotaru is shocked, because no one but Zakuro has touched the pendant.
7	"A Feline House"; Transliteration: "Uchi, Nyannyan to" (Japanese: うち、猫々と)	November 16, 2010
Tae, a servant in the Agemaki household, comes to the Ministry to bring Agemaki home. He agrees to go, but begs Zakuro to come with him. However, she must hide her ears. As compensation, Agemaki must buy her candy later. Once at the house, Zakuro asks Agemaki if he brought her to the house to investigate a spirit. Agemaki is surprised that a spirit still resides in the house. The pair are called down to dinner, where Zakuro learns that Agemaki's father wholeheartedly supports Westernization and is greatly prejudiced against spirits. She notices that Agemaki's sister is feeding a cat. He explains that when he was younger, a spirit frightened him. His father scolded him for being afraid. Later, Agemaki noticed that his cat, Itsue, was missing. Although he promised to apologize for whatever he did wrong or give up some other treasure, Itsue never returned. Zakuro tells Agemaki that Itsue has always been in the house. She asks Itsue to change form and appear to Agemaki. When Agemki can see Itsue, he finds that she was the spirit that frightened him. Zakuro explains that when a cat is loved, it becomes a cat demon. Itsue simply wanted to thank Agemaki for being kind. She notes that most humans cannot see Itsue in her original form, but there seems to be an exception. The next morning, Agemaki's mother apologizes for her husband's discourtesy, hinting that she realizes Zakuro is a spirit.
8	"Fickle Rain"; Transliteration: "Ame, Adaada to" (Japanese: あめ、徒々と)	November 23, 2010
While buying a present for Zakuro, Agemaki runs into Susukihotaru, who is returning Orikata's enchanted sword by herself because Yoshinokazura is cleaning shelves. Outside of Orikata's shop, the two cloaked figures they encountered at the gala appear and use sleeping powder on the pair. At the ministry, Orikata and Mugi tell the representatives that they found Agemaki's gift and the sword outside her shop. Zakuro wants to rescue them, but Kushimatsu refuses to let her go and locks Zakuro in her room. Lord Amaryoju tells Kushimatsu that she can do nothing against the Village of Oracles and orders her to let Zakuro leave. Meanwhile, the rest of the representatives let Zakuro free, and she and Yoshinokura set out. Agemaki and Susukihotaru wake up and learn that their captives are luring Zakuro out on the orders of Lady Rangui, the Black Widow. Zakuro and Yoshinokazura find where Agemaki and Susukihotaru are being held and are attacked by the cloaked figures. The figures reveal their identity as half-spirits. They tell Zakuro that the rain will soon flood the basement her "loved ones" are being held in, drowning them. Infuriated, Zakuro gravely injures the twin with markings. A magic seal bearing Rangui's image appears and takes the twins away. Zakuro and Yoshinokazura are able to rescue Agemaki and Susukihotaru before they are killed. Upon returning home, Agemaki apologizes for making Zakuro worry. Although she claims she was not worried, she cannot stop crying. The twins return home with Rangui. When the twin without markings, Daidai, is gone, Rangui expresses her disgust for her. As she treats the other, Byakuroku, she states that as long as Byakuroku serves her, Daidai will be treated the same as Byakuroku. As she is healing, Byakuroku expresses her anger at the freedom and happiness that Zakuro has.
9	"Joy of Love"; Transliteration: "Sachi, Koikoi to" (Japanese: さち、恋々と)	November 30, 2010
The three maids are curious about the relationships between the representatives. The twins tell them that human girls play kokkuri to answer such questions. At the same time, Hanadate reports that a strange spirit appears whenever kokkuri is played. Although it has not harmed anyone, he wishes to prevent future damage. So, the group decides to play the game. When they begin, a spirit-like being appears. However, it is just a visualization of the feelings of humans who mistook it for the kokkuri's appearance. The maids and the twins immediately ask it questions about Agemaki's romantic interests. Zakuro does not want to know the answer and tries to stop the kokkuri, causing it to flee. In the courtyard, she attacks it with her blade with no effect. Before it escapes, they hear a voice asking about love. Lord Amaryoju believes that the kokkuri will disappear after witnessing a demonstration of love. However, the love does not have to be genuine. Feeling that he must help, Hanadate accompanies Zakuro and Agemaki. The three of them find the kokkuri. Agemaki begins to say he loves someone, however Zakuro stops him because she does not want him to say something he does not mean. Impatient, the kokkuri charges toward Hanadate. He professes his love for Zakuro. She replies that she loves him, and the kokkuri disappears. Zakuro thanks Hanadate for lying, but he insists that he is a poor liar. Later, Susukihotaru and the maids ask Zakuro if she loves Hanadate or Agemaki. Angry, Zakuro states she is confused because of them. Agemaki realizes Zakuro does not mean what she said to the kokkuri, but he does not understand why he is depressed. Elsewhere, Rangui tells a masked man that he is lying when he describes himself as a poor liar.
10	"Creeping Shadows"; Transliteration: "Kage, Oioi to" (Japanese: かげ、追々と)	December 7, 2010
At a festival, the representatives pay their respects to Lords A and Um, a pair of komainu-like spirits. When A and Um ask if Zakuro and Agemaki are lovers, she denies it. After, the representatives race each other through the festival's maze. Zakuro refuses to go with Agemaki, but they run into each other in the maze. Agemaki wants to apologize for making Zakuro angry, but she insists that she is not angry. Eventually, Zakuro admits that she does not hate humans. Agemaki takes her hand and leads her. When he asks her if she knows how he feels about her, she runs away. Soon after, she is surrounded by light. Elsewhere, Rangui tells the masked man that she captured Zakuro. Zakuro dreams that she is in a flower field with her mother, who is taken away by small, black spirits. She awakens to find she is shackled to a bed. The masked man enters and reveals himself to be Hanadate, whose true name is Omodaka. He tries to kiss her, but she pushes him away. Zakuro wishes to return home, angering Byakuroku and causing her to cough violently. Zakuro learns that Byakuroku's body suffers when she uses her powers and gives some of her powers to restore Byakuroku's health. Later, Omodaka, sensing that Byakuroku has Zakuro's power, kisses and embraces her. He is confident that Zakuro is perfect for bearing his child. The representatives learn Zakuro is at the Village of the Oracles. However, they cannot enter the Village because it hovers outside reality. Rangui, infuriated that Omodaka prefers Zakuro, tries to kill Zakuro, breaking the shackles and allowing Zakuro to escape. Upon locating Zakuro, Byakuroku tells her that many female half-spirits are imprisoned because they resemble a powerful half-spirit, Zakuro.
11	"Hollow Touch"; Transliteration: "Furete, Karakara to" (Japanese: ふれて、殻々と)	December 14, 2010
As Zakuro tries to escape, she finds her mother and once touching her sees into her memories. Back at the Ministry of Spirit Affairs, Kushimatsu tells the other representatives the truth about Zakuro and the Village of Oracles. In the past, Zakuro's mother; Tsukuhane, was wed to the chief of the Village of Oracles, who sought her for her powers. Soon after she gave birth to an heir (Omodaka), she met a human named Enaga, and fell in love with him. She attempted to escape from the village, but Enaga catches up to her and tells her that he will come with her. Unfortunately, they are caught, and Enaga is killed, but before he dies, Tsukuhane tells him she's carrying their child (Zakuro). It is revealed that Omodaka was the one who told the Chief what happened between his mother and Enaga. Tsukuhane is put through a fox spirit ritual to turn her unborn child into a half spirit. When the child is born, they realize she has incredible powers. Tsukuhane is fearful that the Village will use her child for their own gain, so she escapes with the help of Kushimatsu. Back in the present, Kushimatsu explains that the pendant Zakuro's mother had given to her acts as a seal to keep her powers restrained and to keep the Village of Oracles from finding her. Agemaki vows that he and the others will rescue Zakuro.
12	"Looming Crisis"; Transliteration: "Kiki, Jirijiri to" (Japanese: きき、焦々と)	December 21, 2010
Zakuro finally learns the reason of her birth and of half-spirits. She is captured by Omodaka again, and is forced to act against her own will. Meanwhile, Agemaki and the other representatives dash off to save Zakuro, armed with only the slightest of clues. With the guidance of Lords A and Um, they reach the Village of Oracles, but the group finds that they are separated from Agemaki. Agemaki hears Tsukuahne's voice and listens to the message she wants him to give to her children. The others find Zakuro with Omodaka in a marriage ritual that they stop, so he orders his men dispose of them, while he and Byakuroku try to bring Zakuro to the place where his mother and Enaga met. Before he does so, he is confronted by Agemaki. The others arrive as they battle, and Agemaki notices Zakuro's pendant but allows it to stay. Agemaki tells Omodaka how his mother felt, but Omodaka refuses to accept it. Suddenly, the group sees the Village of Oracles in flames. Omodaka runs to the village, carrying Zakuro, with Byakuroku, Agemaki, and the others following him.
13	"Brilliant Finale"; Transliteration: "Owari, Sansan to" (Japanese: おわり、燦々と)	December 28, 2010
With Byakuroku leading the way, the Spirit Affairs agents arrive at the Village of Oracles. It is revealed that Rangui has manipulated Daidai; taking advantage of the envy she has for her older sister's "favoritism", and causing Daidai to burn the village. As Byakuroku searches for Daidai, she is shocked to discover that her sister has been fatally wounded by Rangui. As she dies, Daidai tells Byakuroku how much she envied her. Byakuroku attacks Rangui out of anguish, but her attacks are useless, because Rangui is more powerful than before. With Omodaka's help, the representatives battle Rangui. Rangui attacks Zakuro, but Agemaki shields her, and they are both trapped in Rangui's web with Zakuro still unconscious. Agemaki, refusing to give up since he has yet to tell her how he feels, hugs Zakuro and tells her he loves her. Zakuro wakes after she hears this, and releases her true power to destroy Rangui. As the village burns down, Omodaka goes to the room where Tsukahane's body is. He wishes to remain with his mother, and Byakuroku, having nowhere else to go, stays with him too. Zakuro, Agemaki and the others flee the village. Back at the manor, Kushimatsu tells the representatives that the Ministry of Spirit Affairs will be terminated. As everyone says their goodbyes, Agemaki tells Zakuro once again that he loves her, and Zakuro, reluctant at first, says that she loves him, too. They kiss (though it is off-screen). In the epilogue, things look well for humans and spirits, and it seems Omodaka and Byakuroku survived. In the end, the Ministry of Spirit Affairs has been reinstated, since Agemaki and the other lieutenants pleaded with their general, who agreed. Everyone is back together.
