= Lily Hoshino =

Japanese manga artist

- 星野 リリィ
- Born: December 17, 1978 (age 47); Nagano Prefecture, Japan
- Occupation: Manga artist
- Spouse: Unnamed husband (m. 2016)
- Children: 2

Lily Hoshino (星野 リリィ, Hoshino Riryi; born December 17, 1978) is a Japanese manga artist. She is known for her extremely cute art style featured in her many published manga, some of which are boys' love (BL) series.

On January 25, 2016, Hoshino announced that she had gotten married. In September 2016, she gave birth to her first child, a son. In March 2019, she gave birth to her second son.

== Works ==
=== Manga ===
Release date	Japanese title	Romanized title	Notes
July 2000	奥サマは女子高生!?	Oku-sama wa Joshi-kōsei!?	
September 2001	抱きごこちはいかが？	Daki-gogochi wa Ikaga?	
November 2001	ほしいほしい君がほしい	Hoshii Hoshii Kimi ga Hoshii	
September 2002	あいしちゃったの	Ai shichatta no	
October 2002	欲ばりはダメなの	Yokubari wa Dame nano	
August 2003 – May 2007	都立魔法学園	Toritsu Mahō Gakuen	Three volume series
November 2003	ミックス・ミックス・チョコレート	Mix Mix Chocolate	Released in English as Chocolate Surprise by Aurora Publishing
December 2003	かわいがって下さい	Kawaigatte Kudasai	
February 2004	花嫁くん	Hanayome-kun	Released in English as Mr. Flower Bride by Yen Press
June 2004	ハレムでひとり	Harem de Hitori	Released in English as Alone in My King's Harem by Digital Manga Publishing
August 2004	ボクだけの王さま	Boku dake no Ō-sama	Released in English as My Only King by Digital Manga Publishing
September 2004	ナースがお仕事	Nurse ga Oshigoto	Released in English as The Nurse's Job by Digital Manga Publishing
February 2005	スーパーダブル	Super Double	
August 2005	花ムコさん	Hanamuko-san	Released in English as Mr. Flower Groom by Yen Press
March 2006	魔法細工	Mahō Saiku	
August 2006	私と王子様	Watashi to Ōji-sama	
August 2006	ラブクエ	Rabu Kue	Released in English as Love Quest by Yen Press
January 2008 – hiatus	おとめ妖怪ざくろ	Otome Yōkai Zakuro	Adapted into an anime series in 2010; licensed in English by NIS America in 2012
February 2008	ハート貫いて	Heart Tsuranuite	One-shot published in Monthly Comic Avarus
August 2008	夢見る古都	Yumemiru Koto	Released in English as Romance of an Ancient Dreaming City by Digital Manga Publishing
December 2009	夜に生まれた	Yoru ni Umareta	
2013 – hiatus	きぐるみ防衛隊	Kigurumi Gādianzu	Released in English as Kigurumi Guardians by Kodansha Comics

=== Anime ===
- Mawaru Penguindrum (2011) – Original character design
- A Certain Magical Index: The Movie – The Miracle of Endymion (2013) – guest character design
- Tsukumogami Kashimasu (2018) – Original character design
- The Stories of Girls Who Couldn't Be Magicians (2024) – Original character design
