= My Only King =

Japanese manga series

- Cover of My Only King as published by Digital Manga Publishing

ボクだけの王さま (Boku Dake no Ousama)
- Genre: Fantasy, Yaoi
- Manga
- Written by: Lily Hoshino
- Published by: Kousai Shobou
- English publisher: NA: Digital Manga Publishing
- Published: August 28, 2004

My Only King (ボクだけの王さま, Boku Dake no Ousama) is a Japanese manga series written and illustrated by Lily Hoshino. It was released in English by Digital Manga Publishing on March 15, 2006.

== Reception ==
Julie Rosato viewed Hoshino's feminine uke designs as a flaw, and thought that each of the stories weren't given enough space to develop properly. Phil Guie was confused as to what the theme of the anthology was, but noted that most of the stories are lighthearted. Joanna Draper Carlson thought the main story of the volume ended too "abruptly", and also criticised the feminine uke designs.
