= Isekai Onsen Paradise =

Japanese light novel series

- First light novel volume cover

名湯『異世界の湯』開拓記～アラフォー温泉マニアの転生先は、のんびり温泉天国でした～ (Meitō "Isekai no Yu" Kaitaku-ki: AraFō Onsen Mania Tensei-saki wa, Nonbiri Onsen Tengoku Deshita)
- Genre: Isekai
- Novel series
- Written by: Konao Menrui
- Published by: Novel Up Plus
- Original run: September 6, 2019 – present
- Light novel
- Written by: Konao Menrui
- Illustrated by: Yoshitake
- Published by: Hobby Japan
- Imprint: HJ Novels
- Original run: August 19, 2021 – present
- Volumes: 3
- Manga
- Written by: Konao Menrui
- Illustrated by: Masahito Sasaki
- Published by: Hobby Japan
- Imprint: HJ Comics
- Magazine: Comic Fire
- Original run: November 19, 2021 – December 25, 2023
- Volumes: 2
- Anime television series
- Directed by: Tomonori Mine
- Written by: Yōhei Kashii
- Studio: BloomZ; Wolfsbane; Gekkou (production assistance)
- Licensed by: Ascendent Animation / Coolmic
- Original network: Tokyo MX, BS Fuji
- Original run: January 12, 2024 – March 29, 2024
- Episodes: 12
- icon

Isekai Onsen Paradise (Japanese: 名湯『異世界の湯』開拓記～アラフォー温泉マニアの転生先は、のんびり温泉天国でした～, Hepburn: Meitō "Isekai no Yu" Kaitaku-ki: AraFō Onsen Mania Tensei-saki wa, Nonbiri Onsen Tengoku Deshita; 'Pioneer Log of the Storied Hot Springs "Alternate World's Springs": The Reincarnation Destination of an Onsen Fan (Who's Around 40) Was a Relaxing Hot Spring Paradise') is a Japanese light novel series written by Konao Menrui and illustrated by Yoshitake. It began serialization online in September 2019 on Hobby Japan's user-generated novel publishing website Novel Up Plus. It was later published by Hobby Japan with three volumes since August 2021 under their HJ Novels imprint. A manga adaptation with art by Masahito Sasaki was serialized online via Hobby Japan's Comic Fire website from November 2021 to December 2023 and was collected in two tankōbon volumes. A short-form anime television series adaptation produced by BloomZ and Wolfsbane aired from January to March 2024.

== Plot ==
Kōzō Yukawa is an avid hot springs enthusiast. While searching for a hot spring in the mountains, he falls off a cliff and dies. An Inari spirit reincarnates him in a fantasy world. Retaining his passion, he quickly finds a hot spring and entices various ladies, including the Inari's messenger, Mayudama, and some elves, to bathe with him.

== Characters ==
Kōzō Yukawa (湯川好蔵, Yukawa Kōzō)
Voiced by: Shōhei Tokiwa (Japanese); Christopher Escalante (English)
Mayudama (繭玉)
Voiced by: Marie Miyake (Japanese); Diana Garnet (English)
Ririumu (リリウム)
Voiced by: Ria Koito
Ōhendeku (オーヘンデック)
Voiced by: Kyōko Kuramoto (Japanese); Laura K. Welsh (English)
Ruirui (ルイルイ)
Voiced by: Akari Miyazaki (Japanese); Katlyn Dannes (English)
Komachi (小町)
Voiced by: Mariko Miyase (Japanese); Betty BAT (English)

== Media ==
=== Light novel ===
Written by Konao Menrui, Isekai Onsen Paradise began serialization on Hobby Japan's user-generated novel publishing website Novel Up Plus on September 6, 2019. It later began being published, with illustrations by Yoshitake, under Hobby Japan's HJ Novels imprint in August 2021. Three volumes have been released as of August 19, 2022.

No.	Release date	ISBN
1	August 19, 2021	978-4-79-862573-7
2	December 18, 2021	978-4-79-862697-0
3	August 19, 2022	978-4-79-862899-8

=== Manga ===
A manga adaptation illustrated by Masahito Sasaki was serialized on Hobby Japan's Comic Fire manga website from November 19, 2021, to December 25, 2023. Its chapters were collected into two tankōbon volumes from August 2022 to December 2023.

No.	Release date	ISBN
1	August 1, 2022	978-4-7986-2894-3
2	December 28, 2023	978-4-7986-3391-6

=== Anime ===
A short-form anime television series adaptation was announced on November 26, 2023. The series is produced by BloomZ and Wolfsbane with production assistance by Gekkou. Tomonori Mine directed the anime, with Yōhei Kashii writing series scripts, Minori Homura handling the character designs, and YAB EntertainMent credited for music production. It aired on Tokyo MX and BS Fuji from January 12 to March 29, 2024, with the AnimeFesta service streaming an explicit and "steam-less" version of the anime. The series' theme song "Baby love! Baby please!" is performed by GuilDrops. The series was licensed by the manga and anime platform, Coolmic, and an English-subtitled version of the anime was released on their website. A Blu-ray box of the anime was released by Gekkou on May 29, 2024, through Pixiv's BOOTH e-commerce platform.
