= Akihiko Ishizumi =

Japanese stage actor and voice actor

- 石住 昭彦
- Born: October 25, 1961 (age 65); Ehime Prefecture, Japan
- Occupations: Stage actor, voice actor
- Years active: 1986–present

Akihiko Ishizumi (石住 昭彦, Ishizumi Akihiko; October 25, 1961) is a Japanese stage actor and voice actor from Ehime Prefecture. He is attached to Engekishūdan En.

He is best known for his roles in The Powerpuff Girls (as the Mayor) and Hi Hi Puffy AmiYumi (as Kaz). He often voices middle-aged or elderly characters and has an extensive career in dubbing Western works.

== Filmography ==
=== Anime television ===
- One Piece (1999) (Bluejam)
- Turn A Gundam (1999) (Mottokee)
- Naruto (2002) (Suiko)
- Inuyasha (2004) (Ongokuki)
- Ergo Proxy (2006) (Empty man)
- Le Chevalier D'Eon (2006) (Duc de Broglie)
- Les Misérables: Shōjo Cosette (2007) (Pontmercy)
- Nodame Cantabile (2007) (James DePreist)
- Asura Cryin' (2009) (Old Man Shioizumi)
- Umineko no Naku Koro ni (2009) (Terumasa Nanjo)
- Otome Yōkai Zakuro (2010) (Amaryōju)
- Ping Pong the Animation (2014) (Taku Kazama)
- Classroom Crisis (2015) (Takehiko Sonozaki)
- Gintama (2015) (Kozou Etekichi)
- Cautious Hero: The Hero Is Overpowered but Overly Cautious (2019) (Carlo)
- Drops of God (2026) (Kawarage)

=== Theatrical animation ===
- Ponyo on the Cliff by the Sea (2008) (Additional voices)

=== Video games ===
- Onimusha 2: Samurai's Destiny (2002) (Ankokuji Ekei)
- Onimusha Blade Warriors (2003) (Ankokuji Ekei)
- Yoshitsune Eiyūden (2005) (Kichiji Kaneuri)
- Yoshitsune Eiyūden Shura (2005) (Kichiji Kaneuri)
- Layton-kyōju to Saigo no Jikan Ryokō (2008) (Bill Hawk)
- Suikoden Tierkreis (2008) (Sotah, Doga, Rajimu)
- Umineko When They Cry (2010) (Terumasa Nanjo, Masayuki Nanjo)
- Death Stranding (2019) (Deadman)
- Return to Shironagasu Island (2022) (Thomas Harrington)

=== Radio drama ===
- Moribito (2006) (Torugaru)

=== Dubbing ===
==== Live action ====
- Philip Seymour Hoffman
  - The Big Lebowski (Blu-Ray edition) (Brandt)
  - 25th Hour (Jacob Elinsky)
  - Along Came Polly (Sandy Lyle)
  - Moneyball (Art Howe)
  - The Hunger Games: Catching Fire (Plutarch Heavensbee)
  - A Most Wanted Man (Günther Bachmann)
  - The Hunger Games: Mockingjay – Part 1 (Plutarch Heavensbee)
  - The Hunger Games: Mockingjay – Part 2 (Plutarch Heavensbee)
- Alfred Molina
  - The Da Vinci Code (2009 Fuji TV edition) (Bishop Aringarosa)
  - An Education (Jack Mellor)
  - Abduction (Frank Burton)
  - Message from the King (Mike Preston)
  - Don't Let Go (Howard Keleshian)
- Oliver Platt
  - Year One (High Priest)
  - 2012 (Carl Anheuser)
  - X-Men: First Class (Man in Black Suit)
  - Chef (Ramsey Michel)
- 28 Days Later (Frank (Brendan Gleeson))
- 30 Days of Night (Beau Brower (Mark Boone Junior))
- 9/11 (Eddie (Luis Guzmán))
- American Beauty (TV edition) (Buddy Kane (Peter Gallagher))
- Angela's Ashes (Mister Benson)
- Australia (Magarri (David Ngoombujarra))
- Babylon A.D. (Gorsky (Gérard Depardieu))
- Basic (Sergeant Mueller (Dash Mihok))
- Batman v Superman: Dawn of Justice (General Swanwick (Harry Lennix))
- The Bay (DI Anthony 'Tony' Manning (Daniel Ryan))
- The Beach (Gregorio)
- Black Hawk Down (Michael D. Steele (Jason Isaacs))
- The Butler (Cecil Gaines (Forest Whitaker))
- Catch .44 (Ronny (Forest Whitaker))
- Charlotte's Web (Homer L. Zuckerman (Gary Basaraba))
- The Closer (Commander Russell Taylor (Robert Gossett))
- Cold Case (Detective Nick Vera (Jeremy Ratchford))
- Concussion (Mike Webster (David Morse))
- Constantine (2008 TV Asahi edition) (Father Hennessy (Pruitt Taylor Vince))
- Daddy Day Camp (Phil Ryerson (Paul Rae))
- Domino (Alf (Riz Abbasi))
- The Drop (Cousin Marv (James Gandolfini))
- Enchanted (Nathaniel (Timothy Spall))
- Eragon (Sloan (Steve Speirs))
- Final Cut (Philippe (Grégory Gadebois))
- Flightplan (Obaid (Michael Irby))
- Frequency (Satch DeLeon (Andre Braugher))
- The Game Plan (Travis Sanders (Morris Chestnut))
- Get Smart (Vice President (Geoff Pierson), Agent 13 (Bill Murray))
- Ghost Rider (Mack (Donal Logue))
- Godzilla (Boyd (Eric Keenleyside))
- Green Book (Rudy Vallelonga (Frank Vallelonga))
- Guardians of the Galaxy (The Collector (Benicio del Toro))
- Gutshot Straight (Lewis (Ted Levine))
- Hercules (Sitacles (Peter Mullan))
- Holmes & Watson (Dr. John Watson (John C. Reilly))
- John Q. (Steve Smith (Troy Winbush))
- Kong: Skull Island (Bill Randa (John Goodman))
- Law & Order: Criminal Intent (Robert Goren (Vincent D'Onofrio))
- Le Concert (Sacha Grossman (Dmitry Nazarov))
- Lessons of a Dream (Dr. Roman Bosch (Thomas Thieme)
- Live by Night (Dion Bartolo (Chris Messina))
- The Lookout (Robert Pratt (Bruce McGill))
- Love Happens (Lane "Goddamn" Marshall (Dan Fogler))
- Lucy in the Sky (Dr. Will Plimpton (Nick Offerman))
- Malcolm in the Middle (Craig Feldspar (David Anthony Higgins))
- Marmaduke (Bosco (Kiefer Sutherland))
- The Matrix Reloaded (Vector)
- Missing (Doctor Raymond Sims (Geraint Wyn Davies))
- Mission: Impossible – Dead Reckoning Part One (Jasper Briggs (Shea Whigham))
- The Monuments Men (Major Fielding (Miles Jupp))
- Murder on the Orient Express (Edward Beddoes (John Gielgud))
- One Battle After Another (Sergio St. Carlos (Benicio del Toro))
- The Outfit (Roy Boyle (Simon Russell Beale))
- Pain & Gain (Victor Kershaw (Tony Shalhoub))
- Puzzle (Louie (David Denman))
- Resident Evil: Apocalypse (Doctor Charles Ashford (Jared Harris))
- Rules of Engagement (Jimmy)
- The Salton Sea (Holland Dale "Pooh-Bear" Monty (Vincent D'Onofrio))
- Saving Mr. Banks (Ralph (Paul Giamatti))
- The Secret Life of Walter Mitty (Hernando (Adrian Martinez))
- Sharp Objects (Bill Vickery (Matt Craven))
- Shèdiāo Yīngxióngzhuàn (Ouyang Feng)
- Shutter Island (Deputy Warden McPherson (John Carroll Lynch))
- Spider-Man (Robbie Robertson (Bill Nunn))
- Spider-Man 2 (Robbie Robertson (Bill Nunn))
- Spider-Man 3 (Robbie Robertson (Bill Nunn))
- Super 8 (Sal Kaznyk (Joel McKinnon Miller))
- Survival of the Dead (Seamus Muldoon (Richard Fitzpatrick))
- Tale of Tales (King of Longtrellis (John C. Reilly))
- Texas Chainsaw Massacre (Leatherface (Mark Burnham))
- Warm Bodies (M (Rob Corddry))
- Zack Snyder's Justice League (J'onn J'onzz / Calvin Swanwick / Martian Manhunter (Harry Lennix))

==== Animation ====
- 101 Dalmatian Street (Doug)
- Atomic Betty (Doctor Cerebral, Max Sr.)
- The Batman (Count Vertigo)
- Finding Nemo (Anchor)
- Flushed Away (Sid)
- Hi Hi Puffy AmiYumi (Kaz)
- Isle of Dogs (Boss)
- RWBY (Leonardo Lionheart)
- The Mighty B! (Happy the Dog)
- The Powerpuff Girls (Mayor)
- The Powerpuff Girls Movie (Mayor, Ojo Tango)
- The Princess and the Frog (Lawrence)
- Teamo Supremo (Chief)
- Teen Titans: Trouble in Tokyo (Brushogun, Tokyo Mayor)
- Victor and Valentino (Julio "Don" Jalapeño)

=== Other ===
- Cartoon Network commercials (Kaz Harada, Townsville Mayor)
