= Peter Grill and the Philosopher's Time =

Japanese fantasy manga series and its franchise

- First tankōbon volume cover, featuring (from left to right) Lisa Alpacas, Peter Grill, and Mimi Alpacas

ピーター・グリルと賢者の時間 (Pītā Guriru to Kenja no Jikan)
- Genre: Fantasy comedy; Harem
- Manga
- Written by: Daisuke Hiyama
- Published by: Futabasha
- English publisher: NA: Seven Seas Entertainment
- Magazine: Monthly Action (2017–2024); Web Action (2024)
- Original run: August 25, 2017 – August 27, 2024
- Volumes: 15
- Anime television series
- Directed by: Tatsumi
- Produced by: Ryuutarou Usukura; Yoshinobu Iwatani; Masaki Ishii; Sumire Itou; Kazuhiro Nagasawa; Hiroshi Nishiyama
- Written by: Nora Mōri
- Music by: Music Planet
- Studio: Wolfsbane; Seven (season 2)
- Licensed by: NA: Sentai Filmworks; SEA: Muse Communication
- Original network: Tokyo MX, GYT, BS Fuji (censored); AT-X (uncensored)
- Original run: July 11, 2020 – December 26, 2022
- Episodes: 24
- icon

Peter Grill and the Philosopher's Time (ピーター・グリルと賢者の時間, Pītā Guriru to Kenja no Jikan) is a Japanese fantasy manga series by Daisuke Hiyama. It was serialized in Futabasha's seinen manga magazine Monthly Action from August 2017 to February 2024 before being transferred to the Web Action manga website, where it finished serialization in August 2024. It has been collected in fifteen tankōbon volumes. The manga is licensed in North America by Seven Seas Entertainment. An anime television series adaptation by Wolfsbane aired from July to September 2020. A second season by Wolfsbane and Seven aired from October to December 2022.

== Plot ==
Peter Grill, warrior of the Brave Swordsmen's Guild, has emerged victorious at an international fighting tournament and is crowned the strongest man in the world. Peter uses this victory to gain permission from Guildmaster Sanctos to marry Sanctos' beloved daughter and fellow Guildmember, Luvelia. However, women from other races have heard of Peter's exploits and seek the "seed" of the strongest man to continue their respective bloodlines, with or without his consent. Meanwhile, the Guildmaster's obsession with his own daughter drives him to find a way to end Luvelia's relationship, as Peter tries to hide his new lovers from them both.

== Characters ==
Peter Grill (ピーター・グリル, Pītā Guriru)
Voiced by: Hiro Shimono (Japanese); Joe Daniels (English)
Peter is a warrior who is crowned the strongest man in the world. With his victory, he plans on marrying Luvelia Sanctos. However, this catches the attention of women from other races who want to be with him.
Luvelia Sanctos (ルヴェリア・サンクトゥス, Ruveria Sankutusu)
Voiced by: Yui Ninomiya (Japanese); Savanna Menzel (English)
Luvelia is Peter's fiancée and Guildmaster Sanctos' daughter. Peter has been dating Luvelia for two years and he wants to take their relationship to the next level. However, thanks to her father's overprotective personality, they have never gone beyond the act of holding hands and she is naive in terms of where babies come from.
Lisa Alpacas (リサ・アルパカス, Risa Arupakasu)
Voiced by: Hibiku Yamamura (Japanese); Delilah Jones (English)
Lisa is the princess of the ogre tribe. She wants to sleep with Peter in order to produce strong offspring.
Mimi Alpacas (ミミ・アルパカス, Mimi Arupakasu)
Voiced by: Ayana Taketatsu (Japanese); Holly Segarra (English)
Mimi is Lisa's younger sister. Like Lisa, Mimi wants to sleep with Peter in order to produce strong offspring.
Vegan Eldoriel (ビーガン・エルドリエル, Bīgan Erudorieru)
Voiced by: Akari Uehara (Japanese); Joslin Johnson (English)
Vegan is an arrogant elf who places a curse on Peter in order to force him to mate with her and produce stronger elvish offspring.
Piglette Pancetta (ピグリット・パンチェッタ, Piguretto Panchetta)
Voiced by: Sayaka Senbongi (Japanese); Shelby Blocker (English)
Piglette is a female orc who is considered to be ugly by Orcish standards due to her human-like appearance. After getting the chance to mate with Peter, she decides to stay with him in order to get revenge on her clansmen in Orcland who debased her.
Tim Robinson (ティム・ロビンソン, Timu Robinson)
Voiced by: Kentarō Asami (Japanese); Benjamin McLaughlin (English)
Tim is Peter's guildmate and confidant who keeps Peter's infidelity a secret.
Gobuko Ngière (ゴブコ・ンギエール, Gobuko Ngiēru)
Voiced by: Mikoi Sasaki (Japanese); Katelyn Barr (English)
Gobuko is a female goblin who is Peter's long-lost childhood friend and adopted sister. She later joins his harem.
Lucy Grill (ルーシー・グリル, Rūshī Guriru)
Voiced by: Suzuna Kinoshita (Japanese); Maggie Flecknoe (English)
Lucy is Peter's younger sister, a frighteningly strong warrior who wields two broadswords.
Fruitalia Eldoriel (フルタリア・エルドリエル, Furutaria Erudorieru)
Voiced by: Kana Yūki (Japanese); Olivia Swasey (English)
Fruitalia is Vegan's younger sister who hopes to steal Peter's seed for herself using magical enhancements.
Mithlim Nezarant (ミスリム・ネザーラント, Misurimu Nezāranto)
Voiced by: Shiori Izawa (Japanese); Brittney Karbowski (English)
Mithlim is a dwarven inventor who demands Peter's seed to test her inventions in exchange for repairing a sacred sword.

== Media ==
=== Manga ===
Written and illustrated by Daisuke Hiyama, Peter Grill and the Philosopher's Time was serialized in Futabasha's Monthly Action magazine from August 25, 2017, to February 24, 2024. It was subsequently transferred over to the Web Action manga website, where it finished serialization on August 27, 2024. Futabasha collected its chapters in fifteen tankōbon volumes, released from January 12, 2018, to October 10, 2024. The manga is licensed in North America by Seven Seas Entertainment.

==== Volumes ====
No.	Original release date	Original ISBN	English release date	English ISBN
1	January 12, 2018	978-4-57-585094-9	June 23, 2020 (digital); August 4, 2020 (print)	978-1-64-505847-2
1. "Peter Grill and the Ogre Sisters" (ピーター・グリルとオーガの姉妹, Pītā Guriru to Oga no Shimai); 2. "Peter Grill and the Future Father-in-Law" (ピーター・グリルと未来の義父, Pītā Guriru to Mirai no Gifu); 3. "Peter Grill and the Elf-cident" (ピーター・グリルとエルフの関係, Pītā Guriru to Erufu no Kankei); 4. "Peter Grill and the Testament to his Strength" (ピーター・グリルと最強の証明, Pītā Guriru to Saikyō no Shōmei); 5. "Peter Grill and the Proper Way to Take a Bath" (ピーター・グリルと入浴の作法, Pītā Guriru to Nyūyoku no Sahō)
2	July 12, 2018	978-4-57-585183-0	September 8, 2020 (digital); September 22, 2020 (print)	978-1-64-505848-9
6. "Peter Grill and the Fateful Battle" (ピーター・グリルと因縁の戦い, Pītā Guriru to In'nen no Tatakai); 7. "Peter Grill and the New Arrangement" (ピーター・グリルと新たなる「枠組み」, Pītā Guriru to Aratanaru "Wakugumi"); 8. "Peter Grill and the Orc's Proposal" (ピーター・グリルとオークの縁談, Pītā Guriru to Ōku no Endan); 9. "Peter Grill and the Orc-ward Situation" (ピーター・グリルとオークの事情, Pītā Guriru to Ōku no Jijō); 10. "Peter Grill and the Orc's Awakening" (ピーター・グリルとオークの覚醒, Pītā Guriru to Ōku no Kakusei)
3	January 12, 2019	978-4-57-585256-1	December 8, 2020	978-1-64-505849-6
11. "Peter Grill and the Secret Treaty" (ピーター・グリルと秘密の条約, Pītā Guriru to Himitsu no Jōyaku); 12. "Peter Grill and the Fate of the Treaty" (ピーター・グリルと条約の行方, Pītā Guriru to Jōyaku no Yukue); 13. "Peter Grill and the Megaton Axe of Rage" (ピーター・グリルと怒りのメガトンアックス, Pītā Guriru to Ikari no Megaton'akkusu); 14. "Peter Grill and the Principles of Battle" (ピーター・グリルと決闘の心得, Pītā Guriru to Kettō no Kokoroe); 15. "Peter Grill and the Warrior who Cried Love" (ピーター・グリルと愛を叫んだ戦鬼, Pītā Guriru to Ai o Sakenda Senki)
4	July 12, 2019	978-4-57-585330-8	March 9, 2021	978-1-64-505996-7
16. "Peter Grill and the Monster Apocalypse" (ピーター・グリルと小鬼の黙示録, Pītā Guriru to Saki no Mokushiroku); 17. "Peter Grill and the Constellation of Hell" (ピーター・グリルと地獄の三連星, Pītā Guriru to Jigoku no Sanrensei); 18. "Peter Grill and the Feast of Despair" (ピーター・グリルと絶望の宴, Pītā Guriru to Zetsubō no Utage); 19. "Peter Grill and the Goblin's Gratitude" (ピーター・グリルとゴブリンの恩返し, Pītā Guriru to Goburin no Ongaeshi); 20. "Peter Grill and the Only Proper Thing to Do" (ピーター・グリルとたったひとつの冴えたやり方, Pītā Guriru to Tatta Hitotsu no Saeta Yarikata)
5	January 10, 2020	978-4-57-585404-6	June 1, 2021	978-1-64-827235-6
21. "Peter Grill and the Strongest Little Sister on Earth" (ピーター・グリルと最強の妹, Pītā Guriru to Saikyō no Imōto); 22. "Peter Grill and the Dwarven Pact" (ピーター・グリルとドワーフの盟約, Pītā Guriru to Dowāfu no Meiyaku); 23. "Peter Grill and the No-good Blacksmith" (ピーター・グリルとごくつぶしの職人, Pītā Guriru to Gokutsubushi no Shokunin); 24. "Peter Grill and the Room of No Escape" (ピーター・グリルと絶対に出られない部屋, Pītā Guriru to Zettai ni Derarenai Heya)
6	June 12, 2020	978-4-57-585458-9	October 19, 2021	978-1-64-827356-8
25. "Peter Grill and the Pact Ceremony" (ピーター・グリルと盟約の儀式, Pītā Guriru to Meiyaku no Gishiki); 26. "Peter Grill and Qualifying as a Dependent" (ピーター・グリルと被扶養者の資格, Pītā Guriru to Hi Fuyōsha no Shikaku); 27. "Peter Grill and the Law of the Lucky Pervert" (ピーター・グリルとラッキースケベの法則, Pītā Guriru to Rakkīsukebe no Hōsoku); 28. "Peter Grill and the Revealed Truth" (ピーター・グリルと明かされた真実, Pītā Guriru to Akasaretashinjitsu)
7	November 12, 2020	978-4-57-585523-4	February 8, 2022	978-1-63-858124-6
29. "Peter Grill and the Once-Noble House" (ピーター・グリルと堕ちた名家, Pītā Guriru to Ochita Meika); 30. "Peter Grill and Sisterly Feud" (ピーター・グリルと姉妹の確執, Pītā Guriru to Shimai no Kakushitsu); 31. "Peter Grill and the Trick to Apologizing" (ピーター・グリルと謝罪の極意, Pītā Guriru to Shazai no Gokui); 32. "Peter Grill and the Golden Inheritance" (ピーター・グリルと黄金の遺産, Pītā Guriru to Kogane no Isan)
8	May 12, 2021	978-4-57-585578-4	July 19, 2022	978-1-63-858374-5
33. "Peter Grill and the Spa Resort" (ピーター・グリルとエンジョイ・ザ・スパリゾート, Pītā Guriru to Enjoi za Suparizōto); 34. "Peter Grill and the Stickler for Purity" (ピーター・グリルと純潔にこだわるモノ, Pītā Guriru to Junketsu ni Kodawaru Mono); 35. "Peter Grill and the Strongest Hangover in the World" (ピーター・グリルと地上最強の二日酔い, Pītā Guriru to Chijō Saikyō no Futsukayoi); 36. "Peter Grill and the Eight Brides" (ピーター・グリルと八等分の花嫁, Pītā Guriru to Hachi-Tōbun no Hanayome); 37. "Peter Grill and the Ancient Treasure" (ピーター・グリルと古代の秘宝, Pītā Guriru to Kodai no Hihō)
9	November 11, 2021	978-4-57-585655-2	November 29, 2022	978-1-63-858802-3
38. "Peter Grill and the Dragon's Contract" (ピーター・グリルと竜の契約, Pītā Guriru to Ryū no Keiyaku); 39. "Peter Grill and the Strongest Property in the World" (ピーター・グリルと最強の物件, Pītā Guriru to Saikyō no Bukken); 40. "Peter Grill and the Walking Nightmare" (ピーター・グリルと徘徊する悪夢, Pītā Guriru to Haikai Suru Akumu); 41. "Peter Grill and the Door to Tomorrow" (ピーター・グリルと明日への扉, Pītā Guriru to Asuhenotobira); 42. "Peter Grill and the Fearsome Tiger's Attack" (ピーター・グリルと猛虎の襲来, Pītā Guriru to Mōko no Shūrai)
10	May 12, 2022	978-4-57-585716-0	July 18, 2023	978-1-68-579614-3
43. "Peter Grill and the Duel" (ピーター・グリルと「最強流」決闘法, Pītā Guriru to "Saikyō-ryū" Kettōhō); 44. "Peter Grill and the Perverted Peach Blossom Spring" (ピーター・グリルとドスケベ桃源郷, Pītā Guriru to Dosukebe Tōgenkyō); 45. "Peter Grill and the Fierce Warriors of the Perverted School" (ピーター・グリルと「ドスケベ流」の猛者たち, Pītā Guriru to "Dosukebe-ryū" no Mosa-tachi); 46. "Peter Grill and the Inherited Idea" (ピーター・グリルと受け継がれしイデア, Pītā Guriru to Uketsuga Reshi Idea)
11	September 12, 2022	978-4-57-585758-0	December 12, 2023	979-8-88-843076-7
47. "Peter Grill and the Mysterious Attacker" (ピーター・グリルと謎の襲撃者, Pītā Guriru to Nazo no Shūgekisha); 48. "Peter Grill and the Assassin from the Future" (ピーター・グリルと未来からの刺客, Pītā Guriru to Mirai Kara no Shikaku); 49. "Peter Grill and the Flight Game" (ピーター・グリルとフライト・ゲーム, Pītā Guriru to Furaito Gēmu); 50. "Peter Grill and the Day Too Late" (ピーター・グリルとあとのまつり, Pītā Guriru to Ato no Matsuri); 51. "Peter Grill and the Time-Honored Tradition" (ピーター・グリルと由緒ある伝統, Pītā Guriru to Yuisho Aru Dentō)
12	March 9, 2023	978-4-57-585820-4	May 7, 2024	979-8-88-843626-4
52. "Peter Grill and the Gambling Apocalypse" (ピーター・グリルと賭博黙示録, Pītā Guriru to Tobaku Mokushiroku); 53. "Peter Grill and the Shadow Game" (ピーター・グリルと闇のゲーム, Pītā Guriru to Yami no Gēmu); 54. "Peter Grill and the Logic of a Scumbag" (ピーター・グリルとクズの論法, Pītā Guriru to Kuzu no Ronpō); 55. "Peter Grill and the Rock" (ピーター・グリルと心の拠り所, Pītā Guriru to Kokoro no Yoridokoro); 56. "Peter Grill and the Audience with the Queen" (ピーター・グリルと女王への謁見, Pītā Guriru to Joō e no Ekken); 57. "Peter Grill and the Banquet of Love" (ピーター・グリルと色欲の宴, Pītā Guriru to Shikiyoku no Utage)
13	November 9, 2023	978-4-57-585908-9	October 22, 2024	979-8-89-160507-7
58. "Peter Grill and the Loop of Pleasure" (ピーター・グリルと快楽のループ, Pītā Guriru to Kairaku no Rūpu); 59. "Peter Grill and the Awakening of the Ogres" (ピーター・グリルとオーガの覚醒, Pītā Guriru to Ōga no Kakusei); 60. "Peter Grill and the Path of Enlightenment" (ピーター・グリルと悟りへの道, Pītā Guriru to Satori e no Michi); 61. "Peter Grill and the Paradise Lost" (ピーター・グリルと失楽の園, Pītā Guriru to Shitsuraku no En); 62. "Peter Grill and the Ruler of Lewd Dreams" (ピーター・グリルと淫夢の支配者, Pītā Guriru to Inmu no Shihai-sha)
14	April 11, 2024	978-4-57-585959-1	March 18, 2025	979-8-89-373162-0
63. "Peter Grill and the Pact with the Devil" (ピーター・グリルと淫魔の約束, Pītā Guriru to Inma no Yakusoku); 64. "Peter Grill and the Cleaning Up After the Dream" (ピーター・グリルと夢の後始末, Pītā Guriru to Yume no Atoshimatsu); 65. "Peter Grill and the Aura of Life" (ピーター・グリルと生命のオーラ, Pītā Guriru to Seimei no Ōra); 66. "Peter Grill and the Companion on the Journey to Hell" (ピーター・グリルと地獄への道連れ, Pītā Guriru to Jigokuhenomichi-dzure); 67. "Peter Grill and the Proud Bloodline" (ピーター・グリルと誇り高き血統, Pītā Guriru to Hokori Takaki Kettō)
15	October 10, 2024	978-4-57-586016-0	October 28, 2025	979-8-89-373954-1
68. "Peter Grill and the Trick to Being a Bodyguard" (ピーター・グリルと護衛のメソッド, Pītā Guriru to Goei no Mesoddo); 69. "Peter Grill and the Last Holy War" (ピーター・グリルと最後の聖戦, Pītā Guriru to Saigo no Seisen); 70. "Peter Grill and the Wedding Ceremony" (ピーター・グリルと婚姻の儀, Pītā Guriru to Kon'in no Gi); 71. "Peter Grill and the True Love" (ピーター・グリルと真実の愛, Pītā Guriru to Shinjitsu no Ai); 72. "Peter Grill and the Fate of His Blood" (ピーター・グリルとその血の定め, Pītā Guriru to Sono Chi no Sadame)

=== Anime ===
An anime television series adaptation was announced in the November 2019 issue of Monthly Action on September 25, 2019. The series was animated by Wolfsbane and directed by Tatsumi, with Nora Mōri writing the scripts and Rui Ishige designing the characters. It aired from July 11 to September 26, 2020, on Tokyo MX, AT-X, and GYT. (Note: Tokyo MX listed the series premiere at 25:35 on July 10, 2020, which is effectively July 11 at 1:35 a.m. JST.) The opening theme song, "Tsuranuite Yūtsu" (つらぬいて憂鬱; "Piercing Melancholy"), was performed by Yui Ninomiya as her character Luvelia Sanctos. The ending theme song, "Yoridokoro" (ヨリドコロ; "A Shoulder to Lean On"), was performed by Hilcrhyme. Shusei's Project performed an insert song titled "Ti amo". Sentai Filmworks has licensed the series and streamed it on Hidive. Crunchyroll also streamed the series.

On August 13, 2020, Hidive announced that the series would receive an English dub.

On November 11, 2021, it was announced that a second season had been greenlit. The second season, titled Peter Grill and the Philosopher's Time: Super Extra (ピーター・グリルと賢者の時間 Super Extra), features returning staff and cast, with Seven involved as the secondary studio. It aired from October 10 to December 26, 2022, on Tokyo MX, AT-X, and BS Fuji. (Note: Tokyo MX listed the season premiere at 25:15 on October 9, 2022, which is effectively October 10 at 1:15 a.m. JST.) The opening theme song, "Kurenazumu Yakusoku" (暮れなずむ約束; "A Promise Lingering Like Twilight"), was performed by Isekaijoucho. The ending theme song, "Koigokoro" (コイゴコロ; "Heart in Love"), was performed by Hilcrhyme.

==== Episodes ====
===== Peter Grill and the Philosopher's Time =====
Story	Episode	Title (Note: English translated titles are taken from Hidive.)	Original release date
1	1	"Peter Grill and the Ogre Sisters"; Transliteration: "Pītā Guriru to Oga no Shimai" (Japanese: ピーター・グリルとオーガの姉妹)	July 11, 2020
After being crowned the strongest man in the world, Peter Grill plans to marry Luvelia Sanctos and remain pure for her. However, the ogre sisters Mimi and Lisa Alpacas want his seed in order to give birth to strong offspring.
2	2	"Peter Grill and the Future Father-in-Law"; Transliteration: "Pītā Guriru to Mirai no Gifu" (Japanese: ピーター・グリルと未来の義父)	July 18, 2020
Luvelia tells her father about her engagement to Peter, who is less than pleased about the situation. At the guild's party that night, Mimi and Lisa blackmail Peter into mating with them until they get pregnant, taking his pants off. An embarrassing moment ensues when Luvelia, and then her father, show up. The next day, Peter, Mimi, and Lisa are in his room when a female elf looks at him from a rooftop.
3	3	"Peter Grill and Relationships with Elves"; Transliteration: "Pītā Guriru to Erufu no Kankei" (Japanese: ピーター・グリルとエルフの関係)	July 25, 2020
When Peter wakes up from a nightmare involving Luvelia and her father, he discovers an intruder is straddling him. Said intruder is an arrogant female elf named Vegan Eldoriel. After Peter rejects her, she places a curse on him. Meanwhile, Luvelia is captured by a monster she was hunting.
4	4	"Peter Grill and Bathing Etiquette"; Transliteration: "Pītā Guriru to Nyūyoku no Sahō" (Japanese: ピーター・グリルと入浴の作法)	August 1, 2020
Peter rescues Luvelia from the monster that captured her. Later that night at a hot spring, Peter notices that he still has an erection hours after the battle. Vegan then appears and she tells him that she placed a curse on him called "The Eternal Erection". She taunts him saying this curse will cause him to have an erection for so long it will destroy his ability to ever have one again, and the only way to break the curse is to have sex with the one who cast it. Luvelia hears Peter and offers him the chance to join her. Forced to make a decision, Peter chooses to be with Vegan.
5	5	"Peter Grill and a Blind Date with an Orc"; Transliteration: "Pītā Guriru to Ōku no Endan" (Japanese: ピーター・グリルとオークの縁談)	August 8, 2020
Luvelia's possessive father receives a missive from the Great Orcland and the Southern Pork Pie Kingdom. Seeing an opportunity to get Luvelia back, he schemes to make Peter marry Piglette Pancetta, a female orc.
6	6	"Peter Grill and the Orc's True Character"; Transliteration: "Pītā Guriru to Ōku no Kakusei" (Japanese: ピーター・グリルとオークの覚醒)	August 15, 2020
Despite his best effort to avoid falling into the trap, Peter ends up sleeping with Piglette due to the orcs giving her an aphrodisiac and then locking them in a bedroom together. The next morning, he attempts to get out of the situation by asking her what she truly desires. At the dinner table, Piglette lies and says that she and Peter did not have sex. She then requests to be transferred to the guild so she can remain by his side. While she is alone with Peter, Piglette reveals she desires to conceive his child so she can some day exact revenge against the Orcland.
7	7	"Peter Grill and the Battle of the Fates"; Transliteration: "Pītā Guriru to In'nen no Tatakai" (Japanese: ピーター・グリルと因縁の戦い)	August 22, 2020
Peter finds himself surrounded by Mimi, Lisa, Vegan, and Piglette. Since they all want to be with him, the girls agree to have a contest to see who can get him the most excited. As they continue to fight among themselves, a drunk Tim walks in and offers everyone a drink. The girls are successfully able to seduce Peter after they get drunk. The next morning, they decide that they must agree to a set of terms in order to ensure that this situation does not happen again.
8	8	"Peter Grill and the Secret Treaty"; Transliteration: "Pītā Guriru to Himitsu no Jōyaku" (Japanese: ピーター・グリルと秘密の条約)	August 29, 2020
The girls agree to a treaty where Peter is allowed to fulfill his rigorous duties on a daily basis. On a rest day, Peter decides to go on a date with Luvelia. Later that night, as Peter is enjoying his dinner with Luvelia, Mimi shows up. A worried Peter leaves with Mimi where they have sex. When he returns to his table, he sees Vegan eating with Luvelia. He then has sex with Vegan as well. This is followed by Lisa showing up. While Peter is away, Luvelia reminisces when she fell in love with him. Once the date is over, Peter is concerned about the situation he finds himself in.
9	9	"Peter Grill and the Treaty's Aftermath"; Transliteration: "Pītā Guriru to Jōyaku no Yukue" (Japanese: ピーター・グリルと条約の行方)	September 5, 2020
Peter is despondent after he slept with Mimi, Vegan, and Lisa during the rest day. Piglette comforts him and they end up sleeping together. When Mimi, Vegan, and Lisa confront Piglette, Peter realizes they refuse to take responsibility for breaking the treaty. The girls then sleep with him. Afterwards, Peter runs away when he learns the girls are able to break the treaty with impunity. While he is alone, he meets an ogre who gives him some encouraging advice about love. He then reveals that he looking for the woman he loves. When Peter asks who he is looking for, the ogre reveals he is looking for a princess named Lisa Alpacas. This revelation stuns Peter.
10	10	"Peter Grill and the Angry Megaton Axe"; Transliteration: "Pītā Guriru to Ikari no Megaton'akkusu" (Japanese: ピーター・グリルと怒りのメガトンアックス)	September 12, 2020
Peter confronts Lisa where she admits that she is indeed the crown princess of Ogrestan. Meanwhile, the ogre Peter met, Antonio Spartokos, approaches the reception desk of the guild. There, he runs into Mimi. When Lisa attempts to seduces Peter, Spartokos catches them in the act. A furious Spartokos then attacks Peter before Lisa orders him to stop, which he reluctantly does. Afterwards, Spartokos asks Lisa to come back home. However, she reveals that she will not return home until she conceives Peter's child. Spartokos then challenges Peter to a duel for Lisa's affection.
11	11	"Peter Grill and Dueling Manners"; Transliteration: "Pītā Guriru to Kettō no Kokoroe" (Japanese: ピーター・グリルと決闘の心得)	September 19, 2020
At the arena, Peter decides that he is going to throw the match against Spartokos. However, his plan is thwarted when Lisa blackmails him. Peter then reluctantly defeats Spartokos. After the duel, Lisa gives Spartokos one last chance when she challenges him herself. Peter agrees to take on Spartokos as his apprentice after some convincing from Vegan and Piglette. During the training, Peter and Piglette notice that Mitchy Peligrima, the guild receptionist, has fallen in love with Spartokos. A week later, Lisa and Spartokos' duel takes place.
12	12	"Peter Grill and the Warrior that Shouted Love"; Transliteration: "Pītā Guriru to Ai o Sakenda Senki" (Japanese: ピーター・グリルと愛を叫んだ戦鬼)	September 26, 2020
During the duel between Lisa and Spartokos, Lisa uses her breasts to distract Spartokos, which allows her to defeat him. Afterwards, when Mitchy shows up to visit Spartokos, Peter realizes what Spartokos' problem is. When Peter tells him that he is too focused on chasing after Lisa, Spartokos is surprised until Mitchy confesses that she loves him. The next morning, Spartokos reveals to a stunned Peter that he has moved on from Lisa. Just then, Lisa expresses her gratitude to Peter for helping Spartokos and offers him the chance to join her. When Luvelia shows up, she tells him about the Goblin Invasion. Heading to the goblins' location, he vows to protect her. Meanwhile, they are being followed by Lisa, Mimi, Vegan, and Piglette.

===== Peter Grill and the Philosopher's Time: Super Extra =====
Story	Episode	Title	Original release date
13	1	"Peter Grill and the Goblin Apocalypse"; Transliteration: "Pītā Guriru to Saki no Mokushiroku" (Japanese: ピーター・グリルと小鬼の黙示録)	October 10, 2022
Peter and several members of the Brave Swordsman's Guild rush to fight off the Goblin Invasion. Peter manages to save the town from the horny goblins, but is informed that Luvelia was captured by elite hobgoblins who look more human. Peter reluctantly gives himself up to save Luvelia's life. As he is taken to the Goblin Queen, one of the hobgoblins thinks he looks familiar. Peter is shocked to discover that the Goblin Queen is not another sexy humanoid but a large monster.
14	2	"Peter Grill and the Goblin Who Returned the Favor"; Transliteration: "Pītā Guriru to Goburin no Ongaeshi" (Japanese: ピーター・グリルとゴブリンの恩返し)	October 17, 2022
As Tim leads Peter's harem on a rescue mission, Peter is locked in a cage after being raped by the Goblin Queen. The hobgoblin from before lets him out and reveals she is his childhood friend, Gobuko. He remembers raising her alongside his sister until she was seemingly killed. She goes into heat and tries to seduce him, but they meet Tim and his harem, then meet Kenji the Goblin Hunter, who gets knocked out. As Tim and the harem fight off the goblins, Peter and Gobuko try to release Luvelia from her cage, but the Goblin Queen shows up and reprimands Gobuko for betraying her.
15	3	"Peter Grill and the Only Neat Thing to Do"; Transliteration: "Pītā Guriru to Tatta Hitotsu no Saeta Yarikata" (Japanese: ピーター・グリルとたったひとつの冴えたやり方)	October 24, 2022
Peter, Gobuko, and Luvelia fight off the Goblin Queen's forces as he remembers not being strong enough to save Gobuko from goblin hunters as a child and vows not to fail her again. Meanwhile, Peter's sister wanders while also remembering Gobuko. The Guild members arrive and capture all the goblins. The goblins are sentenced to execution, but Peter deduces Kenji's message and says ingesting semen can calm the goblins down, so the men reluctantly allow the goblins to give them oral sex. Gobuko is exiled from the goblin lands, so she lives with Peter. At a party, Peter gets drunk and wakes up to find he slept with Gobuko and the rest of his harem. He then receives a letter from his sister saying she is coming to visit him.
16	4	"Peter Grill and the World's Strongest Little Sister"; Transliteration: "Pītā Guriru to Saikyō no Imōto" (Japanese: ピーター・グリルと最強の妹)	October 31, 2022
Peter's sister, Lucy, immediately arrives and Peter asks his harem to hide. Lucy works as a monster hunter and terrifies Peter by revealing she hunted down and murdered their father for abandoning the family. She suddenly notices a pair of panties, some women's accessories, and long hair and angrily attacks Peter for cheating on Luvelia. With little options, Peter reveals Gobuko and explains he recently found her and was helping her adjust to society. Lucy calms down and she and Gobuko tearfully hug. Lucy then asks why Gobuko is naked, making Peter panic again.
17	5	"Peter Grill and Family Ties"; Transliteration: "Pītā Guriru to Kazoku no Kizuna" (Japanese: ピーター・グリルと家族の絆)	November 7, 2022
While Peter, Lucy and Gobuko are eating, Lucy wonders who cooked the food. Piglette comes out claiming to be Peter's servant, then invites Lucy to join the Guild. Lucy and Gobuko go to the Guild so the former can sign up while Peter's harem seduces him. Luvelia challenges Lucy to a spar, which Lucy wins. Noticing Luvelia was sluggish, Lucy asks if she is pregnant, but she has no idea what that means and thinks babies come from storks. When Gobuko innocently says Mimi asked her to distract Lucy, the latter angrily rushes back to Peter's home just as Peter and his harem finish getting dressed, reveals she hid a recording device, and plays back their innuendo. Enraged, Lucy attacks them and tears the building apart. She then reveals to Peter that she castrated their father before killing him and intends to do the same thing to her brother. Everyone manages to convince her that they were only playing chess, making her stop and apologize. Peter decides he needs to do something about Lucy.
18	6	"Peter Grill and the Enjoyment of the Spa Resort"; Transliteration: "Pītā Guriru to Enjoi za Suparizōto" (Japanese: ピーター・グリルとエンジョイ・ザ・スパリゾート)	November 14, 2022
Peter's harem tries to seduce him while Lucy sleeps, but due to his stress and fear of Lucy, he is unable to get an erection. They decide to take him to a hot spring resort to help him relax. Meanwhile, Lucy is busy with a Guild mission. Peter invited Luvelia to come with them, but she is unable to stand up to her disapproving father and declines while lamenting her cowardice. The harem gives him an oil massage, only to traumatize him by using a dildo on him. Vegan later starts to confide in him, only for the two of them to be knocked out by a drugged fog. Peter wakes up in the Elf village of Minestrone and is introduced to Fruitalia Eldoriel.
19	7	"Peter Grill and a Family Disgraced"; Transliteration: "Pītā Guriru to Ochita Meika" (Japanese: ピーター・グリルと堕ちた名家)	November 21, 2022
Fruitalia tries to seduce Peter, but he refuses. Angered, she uses a spell to make his body incredibly sensitive, but is shocked when he does not have an erection. Her ailing grandmother soon walks in and they stop out of respect. Meanwhile, the harem finds and wakes up Vegan, who explains that her sister Fruitalia abducted Peter and insists that she will save him alone, but they head for Minestrone anyway. Back in Minestrone, the servants explain to Peter that the Eldoriel family is destitute, but their debts will be forgiven if one of the sisters is impregnated by the world's strongest man. The sisters have a massive inheritance, but the magic vault can only be opened if they work together, and they hate each other. When the debt collectors give Fruitalia one more day to get pregnant, she desperately uses a spell to make Peter hallucinate her as Luvelia. He finally gets an erection.
20	8	"Peter Grill and the Sisterly Feud"; Transliteration: "Pītā Guriru to Shimai no Kakushitsu" (Japanese: ピーター・グリルと姉妹の確執)	November 28, 2022
Peter sees through the illusion and loses his erection. Vegan arrives and uses the sensitivity spell on Fruitalia. Their grandmother walks up and Vegan greets her before she and Peter escape. Meanwhile, the harem gets lost and arrives near a volcano. While hiding in the woods, Vegan seduces Peter, then explains only the caster can remove a spell, meaning only Fruitalia can remove the sensitivity spell on him. She explains that during one of their fights, she accidentally flooded Minestrone with pudding and the Eldoriel family became destitute paying for the damages. She then confesses that she wanted to have Peter's baby to spare her sister that burden. Peter orders her to apologize and reveal that tidbit to her sister so they can make up. They go back and Fruitalia asks Vegan to remove the sensitivity spell on her. While Vegan bows, she refuses to apologize and challenges Fruitalia to a fight, much to Peter's disappointment.
21	9	"Peter Grill and the Essence of an Apology"; Transliteration: "Pītā Guriru to Shazai no Gokui" (Japanese: ピーター・グリルと謝罪の極意)	December 5, 2022
Fruitalia is at a disadvantage in the fight due to the sensitivity spell. When Vegan tries to blast her, Peter deflects it and the blast knocks out the debt collector. Peter and their grandmother force them to stop and Vegan finally apologizes. Peter tells them to open the vault and use the inheritance to pay off the debt. However, the vault is empty except a hologram recording of their great-great-grandfather, Vegetalia, who says the real treasure is their family bonds. Angered that there was no money, the sisters seduce Peter together. The harem arrives and they also seduce Peter. Meanwhile, while eating with Luvelia, her father plans to send Peter on a mission meant to get him killed.
22	10	"Peter Grill and the Dwarven Alliance"; Transliteration: "Pītā Guriru to Dowāfu no Meiyaku" (Japanese: ピーター・グリルとドワーフの盟約)	December 12, 2022
A long time ago, the humans saved the dwarves from monsters called cicada-moles with an orichalcum sword called Shiratikmaru. Every year, they celebrate their alliance by sending a human with the sword to the dwarf lands to symbolically destroy a statue of a cicada-mole. Luvelia's father orders Peter to be the representative this year. While training with the sword, it breaks and he realizes her father sabotaged it. He goes to the dwarf lands to find a blacksmith to repair it, but the only one who knows how to forge orichalcum is Mithlim Nezarant, who is lazy and prefers to be a researcher instead of a blacksmith. He finds her just as she is kicked out of her home for her laziness. She takes him to her laboratory and agrees to repair the sword if he will provide semen as fuel for her robots. She unleashes a robot to extract his semen, but when he fights back, it malfunctions and chases them into a room that will only unlock if the people inside have sex.
23	11	"Peter Grill and the Inescapable Room"; Transliteration: "Pītā Guriru to Zettai ni de Rarenai Heya" (Japanese: ピーター・グリルと絶対に出られない部屋)	December 19, 2022
The Guild arrives at the dwarf lands and Mithlim's father, Lord Gordo, invites them to a feast. Luvelia's father gloats that his sabotage paid off because Peter will get in trouble if he is late to the ceremony. Luvelia tells her father how Gordo wants to dissolve their alliance because cicada-moles have not been seen in a century, but her father, wanting the money their alliance brings, says the dwarves still need protection from other threats. Meanwhile, Peter and Mithlim agree to have sex to get the door open, but since she is a virgin and her body is so small, their attempts are painful. He promises to take care of her and fund her research for the rest of her life, relaxing her enough for them to have sex. The ceremony begins and Peter does not appear. Suddenly, a gigantic cicada-mole emerges from the ground.
24	12	"Peter Grill and the Future Legacy"; Transliteration: "Pītā Guriru to Miraihenoisan" (Japanese: ピーター・グリルと未来への遺産)	December 26, 2022
Lisa, Mimi, Vegan, and Fruitalia battle the cicada-mole, but it is impervious to their attacks. Peter and Mithlim arrive, having reforged Shiratikmaru into an axe, and he slices the monster in half. He tells everyone to make the alliance mutually beneficial by helping the dwarves relearn how to forge orichalcum. Luvelia's father is furious that Peter is more popular than ever. Gordo is proud of his daughter for making the axe and saving them, and when she tells him what she and Peter did, he orders him to take care of her and eventually marry her. Luvelia asks her father for permission to go on a vacation with Peter. When he refuses, she finally stands up to him and says she is going with Peter regardless. The harem is jealous that Mithlim is joining them. Luvelia arrives on horseback, says she is running away from home, and invites Peter to join her. He gets on her horse and they ride away to his harem's chagrin. Peter thinks as long as he has Luvelia, he can deal with anything.

=== Games ===
A mobile RPG of the series titled Pītā Guriru to Kenja no Jikan Teisō no Mamoribito (ピーター・グリルと賢者の時間貞操の守り人) was released on October 11, 2022.

A browser game, titled Peter Grill and the Philosopher's Time: Defender of Virtue, was released on the HTML5 game platform G123 published by CTW in October 2022.
