= Banished from the Hero's Party =

Japanese light novel series

- Banished from the Hero's Party, I Decided to Live a Quiet Life in the Countryside
- First light novel volume cover

真の仲間じゃないと勇者のパーティーを追い出されたので、辺境でスローライフすることにしました (Shin no Nakama ja Nai to Yūsha no Pātī o Oidasareta no de, Henkyō de Surō Raifu Suru Koto ni Shimashita)
- Genre: Fantasy, slice of life
- Novel series
- Written by: Zappon
- Published by: Shōsetsuka ni Narō
- Original run: October 2017 – present
- Light novel
- Written by: Zappon
- Illustrated by: Yasumo
- Published by: Kadokawa Shoten
- English publisher: NA: Yen Press
- Imprint: Kadokawa Sneaker Bunko
- Original run: June 2018 – July 2025
- Volumes: 15 (Note: Sixteen volumes in total have been released including Volume 0.)
- Manga
- Written by: Zappon
- Illustrated by: Masahiro Ikeno
- Published by: Kadokawa Shoten
- English publisher: NA: Yen Press
- Magazine: Monthly Shōnen Ace
- Original run: May 2018 – July 26, 2024
- Volumes: 14
- Anime television series
- Directed by: Makoto Hoshino (Note: Credited as Chief Director (総監督, Sō Kantoku) for the second season); Satoshi Takafuji (S2)
- Written by: Megumi Shimizu
- Music by: Yukari Hashimoto
- Studio: Studio Flad; Wolfsbane (S1)
- Licensed by: Crunchyroll
- Original network: AT-X, Tokyo MX, BS NTV, KBS Kyoto, SUN
- Original run: October 6, 2021 – March 24, 2024
- Episodes: 25
- Manga

Rejected by the Hero's Party, a Princess Decided to Live a Quiet Life in the Countryside
- Written by: Zappon
- Illustrated by: Mutsuki Higashioji
- Published by: Kadokawa Shoten
- English publisher: NA: Yen Press
- Magazine: Shōnen Ace Plus
- Original run: October 20, 2021 – January 24, 2024
- Volumes: 3
- icon

Banished from the Hero's Party, I Decided to Live a Quiet Life in the Countryside (Note: Japanese: 真の仲間じゃないと勇者のパーティーを追い出されたので、辺境でスローライフすることにしました, Hepburn: Shin no Nakama ja Nai to Yūsha no Pātī o Oidasareta no de, Henkyō de Surō Raifu Suru Koto ni Shimashita) (Note: The English subname of the original Japanese light novel version is Banished from the brave man's group, I decided to lead a slow life in the back country.) is a Japanese light novel series written by Zappon and illustrated by Yasumo. It began serialization online in October 2017 on the user-generated novel publishing website Shōsetsuka ni Narō. It was later acquired by Kadokawa Shoten, who published the series from June 2018 to July 2025 under their Kadokawa Sneaker Bunko imprint.

A manga adaptation with art by Masahiro Ikeno was serialized in Kadokawa Shoten's shōnen manga magazine Monthly Shōnen Ace from May 2018 to July 2024. Both the light novel and manga are licensed in North America by Yen Press. An anime television series adaptation produced by Wolfsbane and Studio Flad aired from October to December 2021. A second season by Studio Flad aired from January to March 2024.

== Synopsis ==
In a world whose inhabitants find their destinies dictated by the Divine Blessings they receive upon birth, Gideon Ragnason was a member of the Hero's Party, a powerful group led by his sister Ruti destined to save the world from evil. His Blessing gave him the common ability to survive any terrain, and he proves that additional skills can go beyond the limit. That is, until one day, Ares, the Party's second-in-command, considers him a dead weight to the party members and banishes him from the group. Gideon heeds Ares' words and leaves without telling Ruti.

Hoping to live an easy life on the frontier, Gideon moves to a borderland town and opens an apothecary, changing his name to Red. However, keeping his former status a secret may not be as simple as he thinks, especially when Rit, a beautiful young adventurer and his previous crush, shows up and asks to move in with him!

== Characters ==
Red (レッド, Reddo) / Gideon Ragnason (ギディーオン・ラグナソン, Gidīon Ragunason)
Voiced by: Yūichirō Umehara (Drama CD), Ryōta Suzuki (anime) (Japanese); Aaron Campbell (English)
Red is an apothecary residing in the town of Zoltan. His real name is Gideon Ragnason, formerly known as a knight and member of The Hero's Party, who was banished from the group for "being a liability". His Divine Blessing is "Guide", which gives him the ability to survive in any terrain and is important for his knowledge of herbs. To be more useful to his party members, he has learned a number of additional skills beyond the limits of his Blessing; in times of need, he proves to be a skilled combatant, tactician, and leader. Reserved and humble, but with a noble heart, he was much beloved by most of his party, and his leaving has caused much resentment against Ares, who facilitated his resignation. He runs his apothecary shop in Zoltan with his beautiful wife, Rit, who is a former adventurer and princess of Loggervia, whom he fell in love with at first sight, and only grew closer to her. During Season 2, he is now living with most of his old friends including his sister Ruti.
Rit (リット, Ritto) / Rizlet of Loggervia (リーズリット・オブ・ロガーヴィア, Rīzuritto obu Rogāvia)
Voiced by: Yumiri Hanamori (Drama CD), Kanon Takao (anime) (Japanese); Dani Chambers (English)
Rit is a beautiful young B-ranked adventurer and Red's wife, who resides with Red in his home beside the apothecary shop he runs. She is the princess of the Duchy of Loggervia, a military power. She actually came to live with Red both to escape a power struggle within her family, and because she has developed a crush on him while they worked together for a time before his retirement. Her Divine Blessing is "Spirit Scout". Her weapons of choice are two miniature shotels, one on each hip in custom scabbards.
Ruti Ragnason (ルーティ・ラグナソン, Rūti Ragunason)
Voiced by: Ayana Taketatsu (Drama CD), Naomi Ōzora (anime) (Japanese); Tia Ballard (English)
Ruti is a powerful but emotionless girl and Red's younger sister, who happens to be the Hero. The Party she leads is the major thorn in the side of The Demon Lord's Army. Her Hero's Blessing bestows her with incredible resistance to physical discomforts; however, it also makes her indifferent to emotional extremes. Due to this, her love for her brother is Ruti's most important anchor, and she misses him terribly after Ares' scheming drove him away. As a result, she begins fighting her Blessing in order to be reunited with Gideon. She eventually develops a new Blessing called "New Truth", which has the ability to control and dominate other Blessings; eliminating her Hero Blessing's negative effects and giving Ruti her self back. While Ruti becomes close friends with Rit, and genuinely likes and accepts her as her sister-in-law, she has an extreme brother complex for Red. After deciding to abandon her role as "The Hero", Ruti and Tisse have started an herb farm in Zoltan, that will eventually supply Red and Rit's apothecary, as well as sell to others in the area. Despite wanting to lead a quiet life in Zoltan, and hide her former Hero status, Ruti often demonstrates her OP abilities while performing simple tasks, much to Tisse's chagrin.
Yarandrala (ヤランドララ, Yarandorara)
Voiced by: Sora Amamiya (Japanese); Alexis Tipton (English)
Yarandrala is a former comrade of Red's who is still on good terms with him. She is a beautiful high elf with the Divine Blessing of "Forest Speaker", which allows her to talk to and control plants. She was the first to leave the Hero's Party in outrage over Ares' scheme driving Red away. Initially, a jealous Rit mistakes Yarandrala for Red's lover when she sees them hugging each other during their reunion. However, as the girls become more friendly, Yarandrala tells Rit that she only ever saw Red as a close friend, not as a lover, and encourages Rit to accept her true feelings for Red and confess to him. During Season 2, she has moved to Zoltan after reuniting with Rit and Red.
Ares Srowa (アレス・スロワ, Aresu Surowa)
Voiced by: Taku Yashiro (Japanese); Brandon McInnis (English)
Ares is a psychotic mage with the Divine Blessing of "Wise Man". His duty is being the second-in-command of The Hero's Party, but develops a dangerous obsession with Ruti early on. He is responsible for banishing Gideon/Red from the party because he is obsessively jealous of Gideon's personal closeness to Ruti. The entire reason Ares was even in the party was the delusional plan to marry Ruti once she won, in order to realized his ambition for world domination. When Ruti leaves to find Red, he does all he can to stop her while slowly losing his sanity and refusing to acknowledge his own flaws. In the end, he betrays the Heroes' Party and aligns with a demon to kill Red, but their fight ends with his name tarnished and his death at Red's hands.
Albert Leland (アルベール・リーランド, Arubēru Rīrando)
Voiced by: Kōhei Amasaki (Japanese); Aaron Roberts (English)
Albert is a former comrade of Red's with an attitude who now lives in Zoltan. He has the Divine Blessing of "The Champion", which pushes him into an obsession to succeed. His greatest ambition is to become a member of The Hero's Party.
Gonz (ゴンズ, Gonzu)
Voiced by: Masahiro Yamanaka (Japanese); Kyle Phillips (English)
Gonzu is a half-elf and a close friend of Red's. He is also a carpenter by trade. He lives with his sister and her family very close to Red's house/shop.
Nao Stow (ナオ・ストー, Nao Sutō)
Voiced by: Sora Tokui (Japanese); Sarah Roach (English)
Nao is a half-elf and Gonz's sister. She is married to Mido and is Tanta's mother.
Mido (ミド, Mido)
Voiced by: Takeru Mishina (Japanese); Ivan Jasso (English)
Mido is a human and is married to Nao. He helps his brother-in-law Gonz with his carpentry business.
Tanta Stow (ターンター・ストー, Tāntā Sutō)
Voiced by: Yu Serizawa (Japanese); Kristen McGuire (English)
Nao and Mido's son, Gonz's nephew and is a friend of Red's.
Megria (メグリア, Meguria)
Voiced by: Nao Tōyama (Japanese); Marisa Duran (English)
The clerk at Zoltan's Adventurers Guild.
Dir (ディル, Diru)
Voiced by: Kentaro Tone (Japanese); Jessie James Grelle (English)
An adventurer from Loggervia that can use fire magic.
Newman Winters (ニューマン・ウィンターズ, Nyūman U~intāzu)
Voiced by: Ken Uo (Japanese); Doug Jackson (English)
One of the local doctors that do business with Red.
Stormthunder (ストームサンダー, Sutōmusandā)
Voiced by: Yōji Ueda (Japanese); Jordan Dash Cruz (English)
Zoltan's resident furniture shopkeeper and a goblin with the Divine Blessing of a "Craftsman". He has a bit of a beef with Red for haggling with him over the cheapest bed in the shop.
Danan LeBeau (ダナン・レボー, Danan Rebō)
Voiced by: Kenta Miyake (Japanese); Chris Rager (English)
Danan is a member of The Hero's Party, gifted with the Divine Blessings of the "Martial Arts". He knows the reason why Ares banished Gideon from the party. He loses his right hand but retrains himself to compensate. He is obsessed with fighting because of his blessing, which he accepts and as a result he communicates and understands people's actions by fighting them better than talking.
Theodora Dephilo (テオドラ・デフィロー, Teodora Defirō)
Voiced by: Aya Uchida (Japanese); Dawn M. Bennett (English)
Theodora is a member of The Hero's Party, gifted with the Divine Blessings of the "Crusader". After Ares' death, she left for the frontlines once again with Albert, rejoining the fight against the Demon King. In the second season she has changed her name to Escarlata/Esta and has joined Vans heroes party to guide him, but becomes horrified at his heartless nature of killing anyone he believes is evil to get stronger, after he killed a simple conman instead of arresting him.
Tisse Garland (ティセ・ガーランド, Tise Gārando)
Voiced by: Rie Kugimiya (Japanese); Jad Saxton (English)
Tisse is the newest member and Gideon's replacement in The Hero's Party, gifted with the Divine Blessings of the "Assassin". She is accompanied by her pet spider Mister Crawly Wawly. Contrary to her skill, she is shy and has trouble making friends; leading to her and Ruti being besties.
Van (ヴァン)
Voiced by: Yumiri Hanamori (Japanese); Comona Lewin (English)
Van is the new bearer of the Hero's Blessing after Ruti rejected her role. He is incredibly egotistical and sees the world in black and white, believing anyone who does not conform to his standards must die. He comes to seek a mystic shield with brainwashing powers to force the citizens of Zoltan whom he sees as heretics for their laid back lifestyle to fight and die for him. When Ruti and Red stop him, he loses his Blessing and becomes obsessed with killing Ruti which he believes is the only way to get it back.
Lavender (ラベンダ, Rabenda)
Voiced by: Ai Kakuma (Japanese); Macy Anne Johnson (English)
Cardinal Lub (リュブ枢機卿, Ryubu Sūkikyō)
Voiced by: Satoshi Mikami (Japanese); Kent Williams (English)
Esther (エスタ, Esuta)
Voiced by: Aya Uchida (Japanese); Dusty Feeney (English)
Godwin (ゴドウィン, Godōin)
Voiced by: Toshiki Iwasawa (Japanese); Eric Vale (English)
Godwin was an alchemist operating in and around Zoltan. An associate of Bighawk and the Thieves Guild, he was the one who created and perfected the Devil's Blessing. Originally a minor antagonist, his role slowly expands into that of a supporting character over time.
Mystorm (ミストーム, Misutōmu)
Voiced by: Yuriko Fuchizaki (Japanese); Wendy Powell (English)
Mystorm is former mayor of Zoltan, who is respected by the guild executives. She is a top-class magician, and even after retiring from active duty, it is rumored that she can claim to be Zoltan's strongest. Placing the peace of the town above all else, they also carry out support activities for children who have no relatives.
Mogrim (モグリム, Mogurimu)
Voiced by: Daisuke Hatooka (Japanese); Ian Sinclair (English)
Ademi (アデミ)
Voiced by: Shoko Yuzuki (Japanese); Nazeeh Tarsha (English)

== Media ==
=== Light novels ===
Series is written by Zappon and illustrated by Yasumo. It began serialization online in October 2017 on the user-generated novel publishing website Shōsetsuka ni Narō. It was later acquired by Kadokawa Shoten, who published fifteen volumes under their Kadokawa Sneaker Bunko imprint. The series ended with the release of its fifteenth volume on July 1, 2025. The light novel series is licensed in North America by Yen Press.

No.	Original release date	Original ISBN	English release date	English ISBN
1	June 1, 2018	978-4-04-106858-8	September 22, 2020	978-1-9753-1245-9
2	September 1, 2018	978-4-04-106861-8	March 2, 2021	978-1-9753-1247-3
3	January 1, 2019	978-4-04-106862-5	May 18, 2021	978-1-9753-1249-7
4	May 1, 2019	978-4-04-108254-6	October 12, 2021	978-1-9753-1251-0
5	September 1, 2019	978-4-04-108258-4 (regular edition); 978-4-04-108522-6 (special edition)	February 22, 2022	978-1-9753-3342-3
6	February 1, 2020	978-4-04-108259-1	July 12, 2022	978-1-9753-4324-8
7	July 1, 2020	978-4-04-109659-8	November 8, 2022	978-1-9753-4326-2
0	December 1, 2020	978-4-04-109660-4	—	—
8	March 31, 2021	978-4-04-109661-1	March 21, 2023	978-1-9753-4328-6
9	October 1, 2021	978-4-04-111748-4	July 25, 2023	978-1-9753-5053-6
10	April 1, 2022	978-4-04-111749-1	January 23, 2024	978-1-9753-6765-7
11	November 1, 2022	978-4-04-112782-7	May 21, 2024	978-1-9753-9342-7
12	April 28, 2023	978-4-04-112783-4	September 17, 2024	978-1-9753-9344-1
13	December 28, 2023	978-4-04-114179-3	April 8, 2025	979-8-8554-0534-7
14	May 1, 2024	978-4-04-114916-4	August 12, 2025	979-8-8554-1683-1
15	July 1, 2025	978-4-04-115991-0	August 11, 2026	979-8-8554-3401-9

=== Manga ===
A manga adaptation with art by Masahiro Ikeno was serialized in Kadokawa Shoten's shōnen manga magazine Monthly Shōnen Ace from May 2018 to July 26, 2024. It has been collected in fourteen tankōbon volumes as of August 2024. The manga series is also licensed in North America by Yen Press.

A spin-off manga illustrated by Mutsuki Higashioji and centering around Rit, titled Rejected by the Hero's Party, a Princess Decided to Live a Quiet Life in the Countryside (真の仲間になれなかったお姫様は、辺境でスローライフすることにしました, Shin no Nakama ni Narenakatta Ohime-sama wa, Henkyou de Slow Life Suru Koto ni Shimashita), was serialized on Kadokawa Shoten's Shōnen Ace Plus website from October 20, 2021, to January 24, 2024. The spin-off was collected in three tankōbon volumes. The spin-off was also licensed in North America by Yen Press.

No.	Original release date	Original ISBN	English release date	English ISBN
1	December 25, 2018	978-4-04-107729-0	April 5, 2022	978-1-9753-4118-3
2	August 26, 2019	978-4-04-108486-1	July 19, 2022	978-1-9753-4153-4
3	January 24, 2020	978-4-04-109046-6	October 18, 2022	978-1-9753-4155-8
4	June 26, 2020	978-4-04-109632-1	February 21, 2023	978-1-9753-4157-2
5	November 25, 2020	978-4-04-109633-8	July 18, 2023	978-1-9753-4159-6
6	June 25, 2021	978-4-04-111484-1	November 21, 2023	978-1-9753-4280-7
7	September 25, 2021	978-4-04-111581-7	April 16, 2024	978-1-9753-6301-7
8	December 25, 2021	978-4-04-112120-7	July 23, 2024	978-1-9753-6303-1
9	July 26, 2022	978-4-04-112637-0	November 19, 2024	978-1-9753-7095-4
10	November 25, 2022	978-4-04-113266-1	April 22, 2025	978-1-9753-7679-6
11	May 26, 2023	978-4-04-113708-6	September 23, 2025	978-1-9753-9446-2
12	December 26, 2023	978-4-04-114438-1	April 28, 2026	979-8-8554-0648-1
13	February 26, 2024	978-4-04-114672-9	February 23, 2027	979-8-8554-2616-8
14	August 26, 2024	978-4-04-115297-3	—	—

==== Spin-off manga ====
No.	Original release date	Original ISBN	English release date	English ISBN
1	July 26, 2022	978-4-04-112638-7	August 20, 2024	978-1-9753-7139-5
2	May 26, 2023	978-4-04-113824-3	March 18, 2025	978-1-9753-9448-6
3	February 26, 2024	978-4-04-114673-6	July 22, 2025	979-8-8554-1534-6

=== Anime ===
An anime television series adaptation was announced on November 17, 2020. The series is animated by Wolfsbane and Studio Flad and directed by Makoto Hoshino, with Megumi Shimizu handling the series' scripts, Ruriko Watanabe designing the characters, and Yukari Hashimoto composing the music. The series marked the first time Ryōta Suzuki had been cast in a leading voice role. It was originally scheduled to premiere in July 2021, but was delayed to October 2021 due to "various circumstances", and eventually aired from October 6 to December 29, 2021, on AT-X and other networks. The opening theme song is "Iki o Sū Koko de Sū Ikiteku" (息を吸う ここで吸う 生きてく, "Beautiful Day") by Yui Nishio, while the ending theme song is "Minna Onaji" (みんなおなじ, "All the Same") by Jyocho. Funimation licensed the series outside of Asia. On October 19, 2021, Funimation announced that the series would receive an English dub, which premiered the following day.

A second season was announced on October 31, 2022. It was directed by Satoshi Takafuji, with Makoto Hoshino serving as chief director, and Studio Flad returning as the production studio. The second season aired from January 7 to March 24, 2024. The opening theme song is "routine life", performed by Nishio, while the ending theme song is "Michibiki, Sasagete" (導き、捧げて, "Guide and Devote"), performed by Jyocho.

==== Season 1 (2021) ====
No. overall	No. in season	Title (Note: All English titles are taken from Funimation.)	Directed by	Written by	Storyboarded by	Original release date
1	1	"You're Not a True Comrade"; Transliteration: "Ore wa Shin no Nakama ja Nai Rashii" (Japanese: 俺は真の仲間じゃないらしい)	Makoto Hoshino	Megumi Shimizu	Makoto Hoshino	October 6, 2021 (Note: This episode was pre-screened on September 29, 2021 on dAnimeStore.)
Red, an apothecary residing in the frontier town of Zoltan, is popular but keeps his past hidden. He was formerly Gideon, brother to the current Hero, his sister Ruti, and a member of her Hero's Party. Because of his inability to improve his combat skills, Ares, the sub-leader, banished Gideon for being a liability. Being a knight of Bahamut, it will be a disgrace if he returns to his order, so Ares allows him to leave all the items that he got from the party, simply disappear and start a new life. Red meets Albert, an adventurer seeking to defeat a dangerous Owlbear that appeared nearby and requiring a guide through the forest. Hoping to keep his past and abilities hidden, Red refuses. Red's young friend, Tanta, is afflicted by an illness that will render him blind. Risking punishment from the adventurer's guild, Red enters the closed-off forest to gather medicinal plants needed to cure him. Albert sets the forest aflame to drive the Owlbear out and Red is forced to secretly kill it. Albert is suspicious but claims he killed the Owlbear to collect the reward. Tanta is saved, and Gonz, his carpenter uncle, builds Red his own house and apothecary, allowing Red to start the quiet life he desires.
2	2	"The Princess Who Didn't Join the Hero's Party"; Transliteration: "Yūsha no Nakama ni Naranakatta Ohime-sama" (Japanese: 勇者の仲間にならなかったお姫様)	Yasuhiro Minami	Megumi Shimizu	Makoto Hoshino	October 13, 2021
A familiar person enters Red's store. Rit, short for Rizlet, Princess of the Duchy of Loggervia, a major military power. She fled to Zoltan to escape a power struggle within her family and intends to live with Red, which he reluctantly accepts, though he still harbors feelings for her. As Rit settles in with Red, his former Hero Party acquire a new recruit named Tisse Garland, gifted with the Divine Blessing of The Assassin. This episode includes flashbacks of Red and Rit's past. The Hero's party affiliated themselves with the Duchy of Loggervia. Rit was Loggervia's princess and a brash B-Rank adventurer who claimed the Duchy didn't need the Hero. Rit had suggested to her master/teacher, Lord Gaius, that she raid the food stores of the Demon Lord's Army. During the failed raid Rit discovered her "master" was dead and had been impersonated by Shisandan, a general of the Demon Lord's Army. She was nearly killed but was saved by Gideon while Ruti slew Shisandan. Traumatised by the death of her master, Rit became depressed until Gideon - who had fallen in love with her - renewed her will to fight and eventually defeat the Demon Lord's Army. It was shortly afterwards that Gideon was banished by Ares and settled in Zoltan as Red the apothecary.
3	3	"Let's Start Our Quiet Life Together"; Transliteration: "Futari de Surō Raifu o Hajimeyō" (Japanese: 2人でスローライフを始めよう)	Hisanori Kobayashi	Megumu Sasano	Tetsuji Nakamura	October 20, 2021
After shopping for a bed for Rit she and Red successfully have a painkiller Red concocted approved for sale. It is angrily refused at first by Dan, the one in charge of approvals, because of a similar medicine with addictive properties he approved months earlier, and he was blamed for its impact. Rit uses her connections to get their painkiller approved. To accompany this new product, the two then make and sell a health supplement/cold and fever remedy in the form of a cookie (to eliminate the bitter taste which repulses most customers) which sells out in hours. Meanwhile, Danan becomes sick of Ares, as their mission to locate the Demon Lord's weapon, with help from the Desert People, has failed. Ares is furious at the suggestion they only failed due to his poor leadership and Red's absence. Knowing that Ares really only banished Red out of envy, Danan, with the approval of Ruti, leaves to find Red. This episode also explains the Blessing Skill System, which can only be leveled up by killing another sentient living being with a Blessing Skill. Blessings can also affect personality, for example having a combat Skill can actually make people more prone to violent behavior.
4	4	"Of Mead and Motives"; Transliteration: "Hachimitsushu no Riyū" (Japanese: 蜂蜜酒の理由)	Osamu Honma	Megumi Shimizu	Osamu Honma	October 27, 2021
Many are shocked that Rit, Zoltan's most formidable adventurer, is working and living with Red. Rit has a craving for mead and leaves to buy some. Albert visits the store and accuses Red of killing the Owl-Bear. Red denies any involvement, provoking Albert to attack him, but is foiled by Rit's return. Albert is shocked at Rit working in Red's store, as well as Red's speed, moving across the room to catch the mead Rit dropped before it could hit the floor. Red and Rit visit Zeff's sauna and notice a lack of customers due to a competing bath-house built by nobles that includes a restaurant and massage parlor. Zeff is certain he will go out of business, prompting Nao to scold his defeatist attitude. Red suggests using a potpourri of medicinal herbs in the sauna itself to tempt customers back. Later, Rit revealed the reason for her wanting mead: it reminded her of a tradition in Loggervia about newly married couples drinking mead together. Meanwhile, Theodora asks Tisse if she feels joining the party was a mistake as The Hero's Party is encountering failure after failure, causing squabbles among themselves, something that never happened when Gideon (Red) was still around.
5	5	"The Amber Bracelet"; Transliteration: "Kohaku no Naka no Yubiwa" (Japanese: 琥珀の中の指輪)	Hoe Won Kim; Hibiki Yasui	Rie Koshika	Tomoyuki Munehiro	November 3, 2021
The Adventurer's Guild attempts to bribe Rit to return to adventuring, but Rit refuses. Red refuses a similar bribe from the Thieves' Guild. Red gives Rit an amber bracelet and hints his next gift will contain a gemstone. The Thieves' Guild is afraid Rit might view them as an enemy and sends Dia to blackmail her by threatening to reveal her location to her royal family, but this fails as Rit doesn't care about her royal status. Rit remembers before the Hero Party vanquished the Demon Lord's Army: she and the Party wanted to ask the Duchy of Sunland for help, but had to cross the Bewitching Woods, a dangerous magical area, with the help of Red's friend Yarandrala, a High Elf immune to the magical effects of the woods. Rit thought Yarandrala liked Red, but was surprised when Yarandrala told her to pursue Red herself. However, seeing how close Red was to Ruti, Rit decided not to come between them and left the Party to rebuild her homeland. Ruti misses Red terribly and remembers shortly after Red left, she became aware that Ares did something to make him leave, causing her to beat Ares almost to death.
6	6	"The Rampage Begins"; Transliteration: "Hajimari no Kyōkō" (Japanese: 始まりの凶行)	Yūsaku Saotome	Megumi Shimizu	Shōgo Arai	November 10, 2021
While on a medicine delivery to Dr. Newman's clinic, Red saves Jackson, a victim of poisoning, which the doctor diagnoses as a narcotic drug overdose caused by the recently approved painkiller. Red decides against investigating. After taking a swimming picnic break with Rit by the river, which is a chance for them to get closer. Al, Tanta's friend, reveals that he has unlocked his Blessing, that of the Weapon Master. Several members of Albert's Party, gone berserk, attack Rit until Albert kills them. Meanwhile, Danan reaches Zoltan looking for Red, and meets a man named Bui, who is also looking for Red. Red remembers how, as a kid, he would invent reasons to hold Ruti's hand and promised to become a knight so he could adventure with her. Dr. Newman suddenly arrives with an injured Al. Meanwhile, as The Hero's Party is resupplying at an oasis in the Bloodsand Desert in preparation for another quest, Tisse learns of Ruti's lingering misery caused by her brother's absence.
7	7	"The Chaos After the Storm"; Transliteration: "Arashi no Nochi ni Kusuburu Hi" (Japanese: 嵐の後に燻る火)	Tetsuji Nakamura	Rie Koshika	Tetsuji Nakamura	November 17, 2021
When Al recovers, he says that Ademi came to their house and attacked him and his parents with an axe; but luckily, Al's parents are found alive by Red and Dr. Newman. News that Ademi vanished after the attack rouse the people of Southmarsh in protest, claiming he's being sheltered by the townguard led by Moen, Ademi's father. After they hear the that Tanta was taken away by the townguard for questioning, Red and Rit pull strings to arrange a meeting with Moen and Tanta. Moen apologizes for Tanta's treatment, but vehemently refuses to consider that his son might have become a potential murderer due to the urges of his Blessing, and commissions Rit to find the source of the drug. While Al is in the apothecary, a stranger arrives to give him a red-bladed shotel enchanted with a Locate spell. On Moen's request, Rit catches a drug dealer but is caught in an ambush from which Danan saves her. Danan respects Gideon's desire for a quiet life and thus tells Rit to keep quiet about his presence. It is revealed that he is not the real Danan, but a fake one. They also discover that the assailants are disguised minor demons. As Red and Rit later go into town to find Al a weapon suitable for his Blessing, protests against the townguard are heating up, likely staged by Bighawk himself. Meanwhile, The Hero's Party has found one of the weapons of the former Demon Lord: an airship. During the fight with its demon guardians, Ares proves his inadequacy as a party member, but refuses to acknowledge his shortcomings. While the airship gives Ruti the chance to retrieve her brother, she refrains from doing so.
8	8	"The Man Who Would Be a Hero"; Transliteration: "Eiyū ni Narō to Shita Otoko" (Japanese: 英雄になろうとした男)	Yasuhiro Minami	Megumu Sasano	Yasuhiro Minami	November 24, 2021
As Rit deals with Dio and the people who sent the red shotel, Bighawk's henchmen kidnap Al. Al finds out that Bighawk is responsible for distributing the Devil's Blessing, the narcotic plaguing Zoltan. Bighawk wants to use Al for his own agenda by having him execute Ademi, whom he has in his custody. Al instead frees Ademi, and they are rescued by Red. Red confronts Albert and Bighawk's gang, and finds out that Bighawk has been taken over by a contract demon named Belial. Albert, consumed by his ambitions to become a member of The Hero's Party, tries to attack Red, but Red cuts off his swordhand. Albert and Bighawk are arrested by the townguard, and Al and Ademi reveal Bighawk's plan to the public, alleviating the crisis. A few days later, Red and Rit's relationship grows stronger, as he confesses to Rit that he loves her. Al has not only decided to start adventuring but has also joined a party. However, Bui visits the possessed Bighawk in prison, revealing himself as Shisandan, the Demon Lord's general supposedly slain by Ruti, who scolds Belial for making humans aware of the hidden potentials that the Devil's Blessing could unleash in them. After making a new contract with Albert, Belial breaks them both out of jail to join The Hero's Party, only to have Ruti drawing her sword at them.
9	9	"Days of Peace and Ease"; Transliteration: "Odayaka na Hibi" (Japanese: 穏やかな日々)	Satoshi Takafuji	Yōhei Kashii	Satoshi Takafuji	December 1, 2021
As Rit and Red starts marketing hand warmers for the winter, Bui applies as a B-ranked adventurer in Zoltan. Ruti receives some Devil's Blessing from Belial, and, wanting more, abandons the Hero's Party and departs for Zoltan in the airship with Tisse, masquerading as simple adventurers. Tisse chances upon Red at a roadside food stall; they recognize each other as seasoned adventurers, which Tisse reports to Ruti. Later, Red and Rit are led to a fairy dragon hamlet to see a patient, an archfay named Undine, who is affected by a magical drain spreading in Zoltan due to the presence of a very powerful entity. Ruti and Tisse break Godwin, the creator of the Devil's Blessing, out of prison, and in order to treat the injuries he sustained in the process, they seek out the local apothecary - which leads to an unexpected reunion with her beloved brother.
10	10	"Saving the Hero"; Transliteration: "Kore wa Yūsha o Sukuu Monogatari" (Japanese: これは勇者を救う物語)	Yoshinobu Tokumoto	Megumi Shimizu	Yoshinobu Tokumoto	December 8, 2021
As Red and Ruti catch up, Ares' treachery comes to light, and Ruti announces that she wants to stay with Red, thus giving up on her being the Hero. As she returns to the inn, Ruti experiences a sudden spell of sickness, compelling her to look for a set of elven ruins rumored to be in the area to serve as a secret laboratory for making the Demon's Blessing. Bui is revealed to be responsible for the recent magic drainage in the area through the use of an enchanted crystal heart. Ruti tries to settle in Zoltan, but her formidable personality hampers her attempts at inconspicuousness. While taking a bath together, Ruti explains to Rit and Tisse how much of an emotional support her brother is for her, especially since her Blessing as a Hero has made her inured to feeling any joy. Tisse quietly resolves to save Ruti from her forced destiny in the Hero's role. Meanwhile, Ares and Theodora use Albert to track Ruti down. During a break, Theodora explains to Albert that people are not shackled by their Blessings from determining their own destiny.
11	11	"A Gathering of Champions"; Transliteration: "Eiyū-tachi wa Zorutan ni Tsudou" (Japanese: 英雄達はゾルタンに集う)	Yūsaku Saotome	Megumi Shimizu	Tomoyuki Munehiro	December 15, 2021
Tisse shares what she has learned about Ruti with Red and Rit, who conclude that, while Ruti's immunities protect her from the Devil's Blessing for now, she will eventually succumb to it if she continues to take it to negate her Hero Blessing. While Red and Rit prepare to travel to the elven ruins to interrogate Godwin, he encounters Danan, who is ecstatic to see him; but another, fake Danan also makes an appearance, who is revealed to be Shisandan, and was the one Rit encountered before. Meanwhile, Ares demolishes Red's shop in his obsessive jealousy of Red. Red travels to the elven ruins (actually an abandoned base of a more advanced, long-gone civilization), where he meets Ruti and Godwin and encourages his sister to live her life as she wants, not as her Blessing dictates. As they later discuss the effects of Devil's Blessing, Ruti notes that an unprecedented Blessing Without Name seems to have emerged in her. Right afterwards, Ares attacks them, but Ruti defies and abandons him. Ares is then met by Bui, an Asura demon; Bui reveals that the ruins shelter an artefact left behind by the first Hero, which Ares could use to win Ruti back to his side. Meanwhile, the real Danan meets up with Theodora and Albert, and they continue to hurry to catch up to Red and Rit.
12	12	"A Parting of Ways"; Transliteration: "Wakaremichi" (Japanese: 別れ道)	Makoto Hoshino	Megumi Shimizu	Makoto Hoshino	December 22, 2021
Upon discovering what Ares is up to, the heroes converge upon his position. Bui is attacked by Danan, whom he critically wounds with Ares' help, and reveals himself as Shisandan. They reach the chamber containing the artefact they're looking for: Five sword blades, siblings of the Sacred Sword wielded by Ruti and - like Ruti - remnants from the time of the first Hero. When Red's group reaches them, the two attack, attempting to kill Red and use the Sacred Swords to sway Ruti back to her role as the Hero. Theodora appears and attacks Ruti to steer her back onto the Hero's path. Rit protests against this, pointing out that the one carrying the Hero's Blessing is not the world's sole savior, but it is really the will of the people that makes somebody - anybody - a hero. Red, Ruti, Rit, Tisse and Godwin rise against their enemies; Red kills Ares, but Shisandan tricks Ruti into touching one of the Sacred Blades, subjecting her to her Blessing's compulsions and then proceeds to cut Shisandan into pieces, killing him. Under this urge, she attacks Red, but her blow is taken by Tisse, critically wounding her.
13	13	"The Guide"; Transliteration: "Michibikite" (Japanese: 導き手)	Tetsuji Nakamura	Megumi Shimizu	Kei Oikawa; Makoto Hoshino	December 29, 2021
Red manages to disarm Ruti, freeing her from the Sacred Blade's influence, but her Blessing has been nullified and is unable to heal Tisse. As an act of repentance for her stubborn adherence to her belief in the Hero's Blessing, Theodora heals Tisse's mortal wound, and all assembled come to the realization that being the Hero is not dictated by one's Blessing, but their own choices. In the aftermath, Ruti and Tisse relocate to Zoltan, where Ruti has been bestowed with a new Blessing which suppresses her previous Hero's Blessing. Red now fully accepts Rit as his wife, and they consummate their relationship. His life in Zoltan returns to normal, except for the occasional emergency which Ruti chooses to resolve. And somewhere in the wilderness, Yarandrala encounters Godwin, who tells her about Red and Ruti's whereabouts, prompting her to rejoin them in Zoltan.

==== Season 2 (2024) ====
No. overall	No. in season	Title (Note: All English titles are taken from Crunchyroll.)	Directed by	Written by	Storyboarded by	Original release date
14	1	"Let's Go On a Quiet Little Journey"; Transliteration: "Surō Raifuna Tabi o Shiyō" (Japanese: スローライフな旅をしよう)	Makoto Hoshino	Megumi Shimizu	Makoto Hoshino	January 7, 2024
15	2	"The Gem Beast"; Transliteration: "Hōseki no Kemono" (Japanese: 宝石の獣)	Yusaku Saotome	Megumu Sasano	Satoshi Takafuji	January 14, 2024
16	3	"Zoltan's Solstice Festival"; Transliteration: "Zorutan no Shukusaijitsu" (Japanese: ゾルタンの祝祭日)	Ryu Yajima	Rie Koshika	Tomoyuki Munehiro	January 21, 2024
17	4	"The Daily Life of the Former Hero and the Assassin"; Transliteration: "Moto Yūsha to Ansatsusha no Nichijō" (Japanese: 元勇者と暗殺者の日常)	Fumito Yamada	Zappon	Makoto Hoshino	January 28, 2024
18	5	"The Man Who Doesn't Get Chill Living"; Transliteration: "Surō Raifu ga Rikai Dekinai Otoko" (Japanese: スローライフが理解できない男)	Daisuke Kurose	Megumu Sasano	Ichizō Kobayashi	February 4, 2024
19	6	"A Long Vacation"; Transliteration: "Rongu Bākasshon" (Japanese: ロングバーカション)	Ryu Yajima	Rie Koshika	Satoshi Takafuji	February 11, 2024
20	7	"The Two Heroes"; Transliteration: "Futari no Yūsha" (Japanese: 二人の勇者)	Yusaku Saotome	Megumi Shimizu	Ichizō Kobayashi	February 18, 2024
21	8	"All for Blessings and Faith"; Transliteration: "Subete wa Kago to Shinkō no Tame ni" (Japanese: すべては加護と信仰の為に)	Fumito Yamada	Megumu Sasano	Tetsuya Miyanishi	February 25, 2024
22	9	"Take Out the Fairy in Love and the Greedy Cardinal"; Transliteration: "Koisuru Yōsei to Gōyokuna Sūkikyō o Nerai Ute" (Japanese: 恋する妖精と強欲な枢機卿を狙い撃て)	Masahito Yutani	Megumu Sasano	Tetsuji Nakamura	March 3, 2024
23	10	"The Hero and the Guide"; Transliteration: "Yūsha to Michibikite" (Japanese: 勇者と導き手)	Ryu Yajima	Rie Koshika	Makoto Hoshino	March 10, 2024
24	11	"The Hero's Challenge"; Transliteration: "Yūsha no Chōsen" (Japanese: 勇者の挑戦)	Makoto Hoshino	Megumi Shimizu	Makoto Hoshino	March 17, 2024
25	12	"The Conclusion and the Start of a New Journey"; Transliteration: "Kecchaku, Tsugi no Tabi e" (Japanese: 決着、次の旅へ)	Satoshi Takafuji	Megumi Shimizu	Makoto Hoshino; Satoshi Takafuji	March 24, 2024

=== Game ===
The video game adaptation is called "Slow living with Princess" and stars Gideon.

It was released in 2023 on Steam.

== Reception ==
The light novel series has over 1,000,000 copies in print as of November 2020, when the anime adaptation was announced.

== See also ==
- Farming Life in Another World – Another light novel illustrated by Yasumo
