= Penguindrum =

Japanese anime television series

- Key visual of the series, featuring the main characters: (from left to right) Himari, Kanba, and Shōma.

輪るピングドラム (Mawaru Pingudoramu)
- Genre: Mystery; Psychological; Supernatural
- Created by: Ikunichawder (creative group centered on Kunihiko Ikuhara)
- Anime television series
- Directed by: Kunihiko Ikuhara; Shouko Nakamura (Note: Chief Director (チーフディレクター))
- Produced by: Hiroo Maruyama; Shinichi Ikeda
- Written by: Kunihiko Ikuhara; Takayo Ikami
- Music by: Yukari Hashimoto
- Studio: Brain's Base
- Licensed by: AUS: Siren Visual; NA: Sentai Filmworks (expired); Discotek Media; UK: Kazé UK (DVD) (Note: Although Kazé had the license to the series, Manga Entertainment was responsible for its marketing and distribution, due to Kaze's French-based operations.); Anime Limited (Blu-ray)
- Original network: MBS, TBS, TVA, AT-X, BS11
- Original run: July 8, 2011 – December 23, 2011
- Episodes: 24
- Novel series
- Written by: Kunihiko Ikuhara; Kei Takahashi
- Illustrated by: Lily Hoshino
- Published by: Gentosha
- Original run: July 4, 2011 – February 29, 2012
- Volumes: 3
- Manga
- Written by: Ikunichawder
- Illustrated by: Isuzu Shibata
- Published by: Gentosha
- English publisher: NA: Seven Seas
- Imprint: Byrds Comics
- Magazine: Comic Birz
- Original run: May 30, 2013 – January 30, 2017
- Volumes: 5
- Anime film

Re:cycle of Penguindrum
- Directed by: Kunihiko Ikuhara
- Produced by: Masakazu Watanabe; Saori Tadokoro
- Written by: Kunihiko Ikuhara; Takayo Ikami
- Music by: Yukari Hashimoto
- Studio: Lapin Track
- Licensed by: NA: Sentai Filmworks; UK: Anime Limited
- Released: April 29, 2022 (part 1); July 22, 2022 (part 2)
- icon

Penguindrum, known in Japan as Mawaru Penguindrum (輪るピングドラム, Mawaru Pingudoramu; lit. "Spinning Penguindrum"), is a Japanese anime television series produced by Brain's Base. It was written by Kunihiko Ikuhara and Takayo Ikami, was co-directed by Ikuhara along with Shouko Nakamura, with character designs by Lily Hoshino, and was broadcast in Japan from July through December 2011. It follows the efforts of two brothers, Kanba and Shouma, as they attempt to save their sickly little sister Himari from death by cooperating with a magical penguin hat. In the process, they confront their family's dark past.

A two-part compilation film titled Re:cycle of Penguindrum premiered in 2022, with the first part premiering in April and the second part in July.

== Plot ==
A terminally ill girl named Himari Takakura is miraculously saved from death by a strange spirit who resides in a penguin-shaped hat. However, in exchange for extending her life, the spirit tasks Himari's brothers, Kanba and Shoma, to seek out an elusive item known as the Penguindrum with the assistance from a trio of strange penguins.

== Production ==
Penguindrum was released in 2011, and has a message about "one of the most bizarre and traumatic events in modern Japanese history", the Tokyo subway sarin attack perpetrated on 20 March 1995, in Tokyo, Japan, by members of the cult movement Aum Shinrikyo. The anime was described as a "tale of a Tokyo still picking up its pieces after this horrific turn of events". Two of Penguindrum's characters, doctor Sanetoshi Watase and a schoolgirl Momoka Oginome, are reflections of the terrorist doctor Ikuo Hayashi who was spotted by a schoolgirl right before the attack. Other characters, such as Shoma, Kanba and Himari Takakura, are children of the terrorists who performed the 1995 attack; in the story "they will be forced to account for the crimes of their parents".

Penguindrum was inspired by Japanese classical book Night on the Galactic Railroad by Kenji Miyazawa.

== Characters ==
Shoma Takakura (高倉 晶馬, Takakura Shōma)
Voiced by: Ryōhei Kimura (Japanese); Blake Shepard, Jack Stansbury (Re:Cycle) (English)
The middle child of the Takakura siblings and the only biological child in the Takakura family. He is uneasy at thoughts of performing any morally ambiguous deeds. He is assigned to obtain Ringo's diary, believing that it is the Penguindrum, and hesitates after being told to obtain it by any means necessary. He accompanies Ringo as she follows their teacher, and the two become close.
In the novel adaptation, Shoma is the narrator.
Kanba Takakura (高倉 冠葉, Takakura Kanba)
Voiced by: Subaru Kimura (Japanese); Illich Guardiola, Jeremy Gee (Re:Cycle) (English)
The more serious and experienced of the brothers who has a history as a playboy, dating girls only to dump them soon after. He has several angry girls that pursue him, with Masako Natsume being the most aggressive. He cares a lot for Himari and will go to great lengths for her happiness and safety. As the oldest member of the Takakura siblings, he is responsible for maintaining his family's finances and livelihood. He takes his duty to obtain the Penguindrum and Himari's medicine very seriously, willing to resort to any method to obtain them. Kanba does not consider legality or self-preservation when it comes to saving his family. He was adopted by Takakura family to become the brother for both Himari and Shōma. His biological twin sister is Masako.
Himari Takakura (高倉 陽毬, Takakura Himari)
Voiced by: Miho Arakawa (Japanese); Monica Rial, Donna Bella Litton (Re:Cycle) (English)
The brothers' younger, cheerful sister. She loves her brothers very much, and is constantly smiling so that they will worry less about her health. After being discharged from the hospital, she visits the city aquarium but then loses consciousness and dies. She is revived by a penguin hat bought at the aquarium's souvenir shop. When she wears the penguin hat, her appearance and personality changes to that of the Princess of the Crystal (プリンセス·オブ·ザ·クリスタル, Purinsesu Obu Za Kurisutaru), an idol, donning a skintight costume and ordering the brothers to obtain the Penguindrum in order to extend her life. When she was a child, she was part of the aspiring idol group "Triple H" with her friends Hibari and Hikari, but their friendship weakened after she left school. She and Shoma met as children. Shoma convinced his parents to adopt Himari, making them siblings.
Ringo Oginome (荻野目 苹果, Oginome Ringo)
Voiced by: Marie Miyake (Japanese); Emily Neves, Margaret McDonald (Re:Cycle) (English)
The target the brothers are ordered to watch. She was born on the same day that her sister Momoka died and believes that she is Momoka's reincarnation. The death of her sister caused her family to fall apart; her parents divorced and she lives with her busy mother. She possesses Momoka's diary, the entries of which she follows religiously for the purpose of "destiny". It is because of these entries that she stalks Keiju Tabuki, who was very close to Momoka. She believes that by replacing her sister, she will be able to bring her family back together. This includes fulfilling Momoka's wish to have children with her boyfriend.
Keiju Tabuki (多蕗 桂樹, Tabuki Keiju)
Voiced by: Akira Ishida (Japanese); Mike Yager (Ep. 1–13), Andrew Love (Ep. 14–24), Brandon Hernsberger (Re:Cycle) (English)
The teacher that Ringo stalks. He is the science teacher of Shoma and Kanba and the advisor of a bird-watching club. He was Momoka's close friend and narrowly missed being with her at the incident that took her life. As a child, he was abandoned by his mother after she remarried and gave birth to a child that surpassed his skill at playing the piano. Ringo tries to get impregnated by Tabuki, to fulfill her late sister's wish, and goes to extreme lengths to achieve this, even attempted rape and sperm theft.
Yuri Tokikago (時籠 ゆり, Tokikago Yuri)
Voiced by: Mamiko Noto (Japanese); Shelley Calene-Black, Patricia Duran (Re:Cycle) (English)
A famous actress belonging to the Sunshiny Theatre Takarazuka troupe. She is introduced as Tabuki's girlfriend and later becomes engaged to him. Although she is regarded as beautiful and elegant by others, she considers herself and her body to be ugly. She was a close friend of Keiju and Momoka in elementary school. She became attracted to Momoka because Momoka was the only person to ever call her beautiful and is willing to do anything to bring Momoka back to life. She often describes things as "fabulous" or "fabulous max".
Masako Natsume (夏芽 真砂子, Natsume Masako)
Voiced by: Yui Horie (Japanese); Maggie Flecknoe, Genevieve Simmons (Re:Cycle) (English)
A wealthy young woman obsessed with Kanba. She is the current heir to the Natsume corporation. She possesses a laser slingshot that is capable of selectively erasing memory with red projectiles shot at the forehead and blue projectiles that allow memory to be restored. Like each of the Takakura siblings, she has a penguin accomplice named Esmeralda. Her primary goals are to possess Kanba and gain the Penguindrum in order to ensure her brother Mario's survival, paralleling the Takakura brothers' goal to save Himari's life. She is later revealed to be Kanba's biological twin sister.
Sanetoshi Watase (渡瀬 眞悧, Watase Sanetoshi)
Voiced by: Yutaka Koizumi (Japanese); Adam Gibbs, Dickie Sanders (Re:Cycle) (English)
A cloying man that harbors an interest in Himari. He first appears as an all-knowing librarian working at the Central Library's "Hole in the Sky" branch, assisting Himari with books filled with memories of her past. He is the one to place the penguin hat on her. When Himari dies for a second time, he appears as a doctor that demands large sums of money for the dark pink medication keeping her alive. Himari often goes to him for advice, though she is usually troubled by what she hears and is cold towards him. He claims to be from "the destination of Fate", and is accompanied by two black rabbit underlings, Shirase (シラセ) and Sōya (ソウヤ).
Souya (ソウヤ, Sōya)
Voiced by: Motoki Takagi (Japanese); Hilary Haag (English)
One of the two Black Bunnies boys that always accompanies Sanetoshi and acts as his assistant. It's later revealed that he is a half of Sanetoshi's soul due to the spell of Momoka. Souya represents Sanetoshi's manipulative and vigilant personality.
Shirase (シラセ, Shirase)
Voiced by: Megumi Iwasaki (Japanese); Hilary Haag (English)
One of the two Black Bunnies boys that always accompanies Sanetoshi and acts as his assistant. It's later revealed that he is a half of Sanetoshi's soul due to the spell of Momoka. Shirase represents Sanetoshi's wishes and his will.
Momoka Oginome (荻野目 桃果, Oginome Momoka)
Voiced by: Aki Toyosaki (Japanese); Brittney Karbowski, Olivia Swasey (Re:Cycle) (English)
Ringo's older sister who died in a subway explosion on the day of Ringo's birth. She was close friends with both Tabuki and Yuri, whose lives were both saved by her. Her diary is allegedly one that can transfer the fate of individuals at a cost; it can even prevent someone from dying. Thus, others compete for its possession.
Hibari Isora (伊空 ヒバリ, Isora Hibari) and Hikari Utada (歌田 光莉, Utada Hikari)
Voiced by: Yui Watanabe (Hibari), Marie Miyake (Hikari) (Japanese); Brittney Karbowski (Hibari), Cynthia Martinez (Hikari), Kira Vincent-Davis (Hibari; Re:Cycle), Alyssa Marek (Hikari; Re:Cycle) (English)
Himari's best friends in elementary school. The three of them aspired to be idols, so they formed their own group called Triple H, but because of her poor health, Himari had to leave school, and Hibari and Hikari went on to become famous idols under the group name Double H. They are featured on advertisements found on Tokyo Sky Metro trains that show that day's slogan. In the show's production, the real-life called Triple H made up of the voice actresses of Hibari, Hikari and Himari. They sing many of the insert songs and ending themes. Their names are thinly-veiled references to Hibari Misora and Hikaru Utada, respectively.
Takakuras' Penguins #1, #2, & #3 (高倉家のペンギン 1号、2号、3号, Takakura-ke no Pengin Ichigō, Nigō, Sangō)
Voiced by: Subaru Kimura, Ryōhei Kimura, and Miho Arakawa (Japanese); Blake Weir, Greg Cote, and Christina Kelly (Re:Cycle) (English)
A mysterious trio of blue penguins that arrived at the Takakura siblings' doorstep after Himari's resurrection. Only the Takakura siblings can see them. For the sake of convenience, Kanba named his penguin #1, Shoma's #2, and Himari's #3. These numbers are written on the back of the penguin. Each has its own traits based on its master. #1 has pronounced eyebrows and likes looking up women's skirts, #2 is often seen spraying bugs or eating voraciously, and #3, who sports a ribbon on its head, keeps Himari company.
Esmeralda (エスメラルダ, Esumeraruda)
Voiced by: Yui Horie (Japanese); Sophie Marcelle (Re:Cycle) (English)
Masako's penguin. Unlike the Takakura siblings' penguins, Esmeralda is black with a heart-shaped face. It has a more menacing appearance than the others. Esmeralda holds an infatuation with Kanba's penguin that mirrors Masako's interest in Kanba.
Mario Natsume (夏芽 マリオ, Natsume Mario)
Voiced by: Kazusa Aranami (Japanese); Hilary Haag (English)
Masako's younger brother. Just like Himari, he also serves under the influence of a penguin hat that looks identical to hers.
Kenzan Takakura (高倉 剣山, Takura Kenzan)
Voiced by: Takehito Koyasu (Japanese); David Matranga, Scott Gibbs (Re:Cycle) (English)
The father of Kanba, Shouma, and Himari.
Chiemi Takakura (高倉 千江美, Takura Chiemi)
Voiced by: Kikuko Inoue (Japanese); Brittney Karbowski, Allison Sumrall (Re:Cycle) (English)
The mother of Kanba, Shouma, and Himari.

== Media ==
=== Anime ===
The production of the series was announced in February 2011 in the magazine Kera, before being formalized in April of the same year. The series was produced by Brain's Base, written by Kunihiko Ikuhara and Takayo Ikami, and was co-directed by Ikuhara along with Shouko Nakamura, with character designs by Lily Hoshino. Consisting of twenty-four episodes, the series aired from July 8 to December 23, 2011. Eight DVDs and Blu-ray box sets were released between October 2011 and May 2012.

Sentai Filmworks has licensed the series for North America, while Kazé UK has licensed the series in the United Kingdom, Siren Visual has licensed the series in Australia and New Zealand, and Dynit licensed the series in Italy.

Penguindrum's two opening themes are performed by Etsuko Yakushimaru. "Nornir" (ノルニル, Noruniru), is used for episodes 1–14, and "Boys, Come Back to Me" (少年よ我に帰れ, Shōnen yo Ware ni Kaere) from episode 15 onwards. Eight pieces of music are used for ending themes. "Dear Future" by Coaltar of the Deepers is used for episodes 1–12, with a special performance by Yui Horie for episode 10. Episodes 13 onwards use several covers of ARB performed by Marie Miyake, Yui Watanabe and Miho Arakawa as the fictional band "Triple H": "Grey Wednesday" (灰色の水曜日, Hai-iro no Suiyōbi) is used for episodes 13, 15 and 18; "Bad News (Kuroi Yokan)" (Bad News (黒い予感)) for episodes 14 and 17; and "Ikarechimattaze!!" (イカレちまったぜ!!) for episode 16, "Hide and Seek" for episode 19, "Private Girl" for episode 20, "Tamashii Kogashite" (魂こがして; "Scorching Soul") for episode 21 and "Heroes ~Eiyū-tachi~" (HEROES ～英雄たち~) for episode 23.

=== Films ===
A two-part compilation film produced by Lapin Track titled Re:cycle of Penguindrum premiered in 2022, with the first part premiering on April 29, and the second part on July 22. Sentai Filmworks screened both films at Anime Boston 2023, and released them on Blu-ray (with an English dub) on July 4 of the same year.

=== Manga ===
Almost two years after the premiere of the anime series, a manga adaptation by Isuzu Shibata began serialization in the monthly magazine Comic Birz on May 30, 2013. The manga ended serialization on January 30, 2017. The first volume was released on September 24, 2014, and the fifth and last one on April 24, 2017. It was licensed for an English release by the Seven Seas Entertainment and published between 2019 and 2021.

== Reception ==
Penguindrum was part of the Jury Selections at the 15th Japan Media Arts Festival in the Animation category in 2011. The series was nominated for the 43rd Seiun Award in the Best Media category in 2012. In 2019, Polygon named Penguindrum as one of the best anime series of the 2010s.
