= Love Quest =

Japanese manga

- Cover of Love Quest as published Yen Press

ラブクエ
- Genre: Fantasy, Yaoi
- Manga
- Written by: Lily Hoshino
- Published by: Houbunsha
- English publisher: NA: Yen Press
- Published: August 29, 2006
- Volumes: 1

Love Quest (Japanese: ラブクエ, Hepburn: Rabu Kue) is a Japanese boys love manga written and illustrated by Lily Hoshino. It was released in English by Yen Press in October 2008.

== Reception ==
Anime News Network said that Love Quest is a "serious stinker", but Mania Entertainment found it "surprisingly entertaining", regarding Hoshino's art as redeeming the story. Deb Aoki for About.com felt that Hoshino's sense of humour was the saving grace of Love Quest, and described it as "disposable BL fun". PopCultureShock describes the story as being quite good for a oneshot, and roughly equivalent to a romance novel.
