= Wolfsbane (animation studio) =

Japanese animation studio

Wolfsbane Co., Ltd.
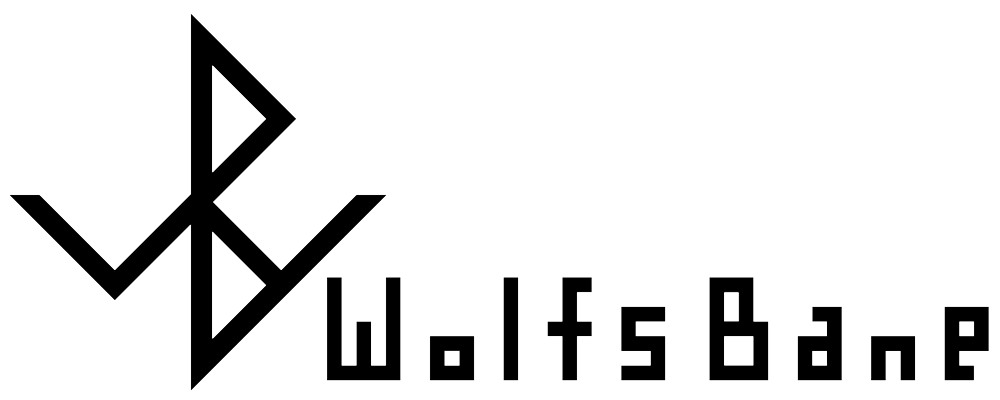
- Native name: 株式会社ウルフズベイン
- Romanized name: Kabushiki-gaisha Urufuzubein
- Type: Kabushiki gaisha
- Industry: Animation studio
- Founded: 2017
- Headquarters: Nishi-Shinjuku, Shinjuku, Tokyo, Japan
- Website: wolfsbane.co.jp

Wolfsbane Co., Ltd. (Japanese: 株式会社ウルフズベイン, Hepburn: Kabushiki-gaisha Urufuzubein) is a Japanese animation company founded in 2017 and based in Tokyo. The company has produced; Peter Grill and the Philosopher's Time, Peter Grill and the Philosopher's Time: Super Extra, Banished from the Hero's Party and Isekai Onsen Paradise.

== Works ==
=== Television series ===
| Title | Director(s) | First run start date | First run end date | Eps | Note(s) | Ref(s) |
|---|---|---|---|---|---|---|
| Peter Grill and the Philosopher's Time | Tatsumi | July 11, 2020 | September 26, 2020 | 12 | Based on a manga written by Daisuke Hiyama. | |
| Banished from the Hero's Party | Makoto Hoshino | October 6, 2021 | December 29, 2021 | 13 | Based on a light novel written by Zappon. Co-production with Studio Flad. | |
| Peter Grill and the Philosopher's Time: Super Extra | Tatsumi | October 10, 2022 | December 26, 2022 | 12 | Sequel to Peter Grill and the Philosopher's Time. Co-production with Seven. | |
| Isekai Onsen Paradise | Tomonori Mine | January 12, 2024 | March 29, 2024 | 12 | Based on a light novel written by Konao Menrui. Co-production with BloomZ. | |
| My Sword Saint Master Is Too Cute to Live With! | Masayoshi Nishida | January 2027 | TBA | TBA | Based on a manga written by Kennoji. Co-production with Lightbox. | |

== Partners ==
Wolfsbane Co., Ltd. is partnered with the following people.

| Company | Note(s) |
|---|---|
| THINKR Inc. | Thinkr is a firm that focuses on Design, Production, animation, AR, and more. |
| Starry Cube Co., Ltd | Produce and distribute animations, most of them being Japanese. |
| CTW Corporation | Produce animated games, this place is all about tech. |
| Futabasha Corporation | Publish books, comics, and magazines. |
| KADOKAWA Inc. | Creates Japanese books, movies, video games, and animation. |
| Hotarubi Inc. | Creates music for Japanese intellectual property. |
| Bandai Namco Music Live Inc. | Produces music and create experiences between the audience and entertainment. |
| Bushiroad Creative Inc. | Manufacture and organize publications. |
| Universal Music LLC | Focuses on everything regarding music. (Recording, Management, and Publishing) |
| Nippon Columbia Co., Ltd | Produce and sell audio and software for video games. |
| Gekkō, LLC. | Company founded in 2017 which operates as both an animation production company and as a voice acting agency. |

== Bibliography ==
- THINKR company description. THINK R is a company partnered with Wolfbane Co., Ltd
  - This is a company partnered with Wolfbane Co.
- Starry Cube Co., Ltd company description.
  - This is a company partnered with Wolfbane Co.
- CTW Corporation company description.
- Futabasha Corporation description
- Kadokawa Corporation description
- Hotarubi Inc description
- BANDAI NAMCO Music Live Inc description
- Bushiroad Creative Inc. description
- Universal Music LLC description
- Nippon Columbia Co., Ltd description
