= Marie Miyake =

Japanese voice actress

Marie Miyake 三宅 麻理恵
- Born: June 7, 1985 (age 41); Osaka Prefecture, Japan
- Occupation: Voice actress
- Call sign: JI1GMS
- Website: https://www.raccoon-dog.co.jp/talent/r06-miyake.html

Marie Miyake (三宅 麻理恵, Miyake Marie; born June 7, 1985) is a Japanese voice actress from Osaka Prefecture, Japan. She is affiliated with Raccoon Dog.

== Voice roles ==
Bold denotes leading roles.

=== Anime ===
2007

- Gakuen Utopia Manabi Straight! as Taikai Uehara

2011

- Sket Dance as Saori Yasuda (eps 28, 33)
- Mashiroiro Symphony as Mitsuko Yukimori (ep 3)
- Penguindrum as **Ringo Oginome**, Hikari Utada

2012

- Acchi Kocchi as Ami Kirino
- Hiiro no Kakera as **Tamaki Kasuga**
- Pretty Rhythm: Dear My Future as So Min
- Saki as Kei Arakawa
- Jewelpet Kira☆Deco! as Chocolat Roco

2013

- Pretty Rhythm: Rainbow Live as Ms. Umeda (ep3-4)
- Rescue Me! as **Anna Ozono**
- Silver Spoon as **Aki Mikage**
- Love Live! as Hideko

2014

- Silver Spoon 2 as **Aki Mikage**
- Saki: The Nationals as Kei Arakawa
- Monthly Girls' Nozaki-kun as Mamiko
- No-Rin as Kanae Sato
- Nobunaga Concerto as Mori Bōmaru

2015

- The Idolmaster Cinderella Girls as Nana Abe
- Seraph of the End as Ako
- The Idolmaster Cinderella Girls 2nd Season as Nana Abe
- Gatchaman Crowds insight as Kuu-sama

2018

- Amai Chōbatsu: Watashi wa Kanshu Senyō Pet as Hina Saotome

2020

- Super HxEros as Minyarin

2022

- Utawarerumono: Mask of Truth as Shichiriya

2024

- Isekai Onsen Paradise as **Mayudama**
- The Elusive Samurai as Homare

2026

- Hell Mode as Thomas Granvelle

2027

- In a World Full of Zombies I'm the Only One Who Doesn't Get Attacked as Sayaka Makiura

=== Films ===
2022

- Re:cycle of Penguindrum as **Ringo Oginome**

=== Video games ===
- Arknights as Purestream
- Azur Lane as Avrora, ROC Ning-Hai
- Miracle Snack Shop as **Philia Salis**
- Final Fantasy XIV: Stormblood as Cirina
- The Idolmaster series as Nana Abe
- World's End Harem VR as **Akira Todo**
- Octopath Traveler II as Mahima
- Fire Emblem Engage as Jade & Abyme
- Umamusume: Pretty Derby as Marvelous Sunday
