= Monthly Birz =

Japanese manga magazine

- Categories: Seinen manga
- Frequency: Monthly
- Founded: 1986
- Final issue: 2018
- Company: Schola/Kodansha (1986–1999); Sony Magazines (1999–2001); Gentosha (2002–2018)
- Country: Japan
- Based in: Tokyo
- Language: Japanese
- Website: www.gentosha-comics.net/birz/

Monthly Birz (Japanese: 月刊バーズ, Hepburn: Gekkan Bāzu) was a Japanese seinen magazine published on a monthly basis by Gentosha's imprint Birz Comics from 1986 until 2018. The magazine was called Comic Burger (コミックバーガー), until it was renamed in 1996. Several manga that were being published in the magazine were moved to the Denshi Birz website after its cancellation in 2018.

== Serializations ==
=== 1986–1989 ===
- Cosmos Rakuenki by Hiroshi Masumura (1986–1989)
- Take It Easy by Kyoko Okazaki (1986–1987)

=== 1990–1999 ===
- Onmyōji by Reiko Okano (1993–1999)
- Atagoul by Hiroshi Masumura (1994–1996)
- Lament of the Lamb by Kei Toume (1995–2002)
- Taimashin by Hideyuki Kikuchi and Misaki Saitoh (1995–2001)
- Garōden by Baku Yumemakura and Keisuke Itagaki (1996-1999)
- Arm of Kannon by Masakazu Yamaguchi (1998–2003)
- Beast of East by Akihiro Yamada (1998–2011)
- The Sword of Shibito by Hideyuki Kikuchi and Missile Kakurai (1999–2002)

=== 2000–2009 ===
- The Music of Marie (Marie no Kanaderu Ongaku) by Usamaru Furuya (2000–2001)
- Blood Sucker by Aki Shimizu and Saki Okuse (2000–2007)
- Kanpai! by Maki Murakami (2000–2001)
- Subete ga F ni Naru by Torao Asada and Hiroshi Mori (2001)
- Karasuma Kyoko no Jikenbo by Yūsuke Kozaki and Oji Hiroi (2002–2012)
- Category: Freaks by Ashika Sakura (2002–2009)
- Rozen Maiden by Peach-Pit (2002–2007)
- Imperfect Hero by Nankin Gureko (2003–2004)
- Tokyo Red Hood by Benkyo Tamaoki (2003–2004)
- 888 by Noriko Kuwata (2003–2005)
- Red Garden by Kirihito Ayamura (2006–2009)
- Otome Yōkai Zakuro by Lily Hoshino (2006–2016)
- Hetalia: Axis Powers by Hidekazu Himaruya (2006–2013)
- Chibisan Date by Hidekaz Himaruya (2009–2010)

=== 2010–2018 ===
- Yurikuma Arashi by Kunihiko Ikuhara and Akiko Morishima (2014–2016)
- Konohana Kitan by Sakuya Amano (2015–2018)

=== Not yet sorted ===
- Bushidō
- Butterfly
- Chalk
- Chi to Hone
- Doro Neko 9
- Drug-On
- Garakua Street
- Genei Hakurankai
- Giga Tokyo Toy Box
- Hakase no Sekai
- Hinata no Ookami - Shinsengumi Kidan
- Kachikujin Yapō
- Kirikiritei no Buraun Sensei
- Kochūdou Nidaime Shujin Monogatari Tenjou no Me
- Kyosūrei
- Kyou Kara Yonshiami
- Meikyuu Hyakunen no Suima
- Mikoto to Miko to
- Mimitsuki
- Monochrome Cube
- Necromanesque
- Opera no Kaijin
- Pied Piper
- Quo Vadis
- Rappa - Rannami
- Rasu Bosu
- Ringlet
- Sengoku Zombie
- Senome
- Shakkin Kanojo
- Shikao Ao ni Yoshi
- Souldrop no Yuutai Kenkyuu
- Tōkei Ibun
- Tumetai Misshitsu to Hakasetachi
- Under the Rose - Haru no Sanka
- Wizards Nation
