= 888 (manga) =

Japanese manga series by Noriko Kuwata

- Cover of 888 volume 1.

スリーエイト (Surii Eito)
- Genre: Mystery, comedy
- Manga
- Written by: Noriko Kuwata
- Published by: Gentosha
- English publisher: NA: ComicsOne
- Magazine: Comic Birz
- Original run: September 2003 – April 23, 2005
- Volumes: 5

888 (Japanese: スリーエイト, Hepburn: Surii Eito), or Three Eight, is a Japanese comedy manga series written and illustrated by Noriko Kuwata.

== Story ==
The newly opened Suehiro Detective Agency is composed of laid-back manager Hisago, dog-loving chief investigator Shimeki and administrator Tsukumo. With very few paying customers, the three protagonists are free to spend their time bickering with and teasing one another, setting each other up in matchmaking schemes and looking for lost pets. Shimeki also has to contend with his knife-wielding ex-wife and the overly dependent little brother he has just been re-united with.

== Manga ==
=== Volume list ===
No.	Release date	ISBN
01	September 24, 2003	4-344-80289-6
02	April 24, 2005	4-344-80549-6
03	June 23, 2007	978-4-344-81012-9
04	November 22, 2008	978-4-344-81480-6
05	May 24, 2010	978-4-344-81955-9

== Critical response ==
IGN gave the first volume of 888 a rating of "Pass It", complaining that "nothing happens, and it keeps on not happening for eight chapters".
