= Akazukin =

Akazukin (赤ずきん) is the Japanese name of the fairy tale story Little Red Riding Hood.

Akazukin may refer to:

- Akazukin Chacha, shōjo manga series by Min Ayahana
- Otogi-Jūshi Akazukin, anime series also known as "Fairy Musketeers Little Red Riding Hood"
- Tokyo Red Hood, seinen manga series by Benkyo Tamaoki, also known as "Tokyo Akazukin"
