= Imperfect Hero =

Japanese comedy manga series

- Cover of the first volume

あかてん★ヒーロー! (Akaten Hīrō!)
- Genre: Comedy
- Manga
- Written by: Nankin Gureko
- Published by: Gentosha
- English publisher: Drmaster
- Magazine: Comic Birz
- Original run: 2003 – 2004
- Volumes: 3

Imperfect Hero (あかてん★ヒーロー!, Akaten Hero!) is a Japanese manga series written and illustrated by Nankin Gureko (南京ぐれ子).

== Reception ==
A. E. Sparrow, writing for IGN, described Imperfect Hero as being a parody of the Super Sentai genre. Ed Chavez, writing for Mania.com, described the plot as being like a sitcom.
