= Taimashin =

Japanese Manga

- Cover of the first Japanese volume

退魔針
- Genre: Horror, Supernatural
- Manga
- Written by: Hideyuki Kikuchi
- Illustrated by: Misaki Saitoh
- Published by: Scholar; Sony Magazines; Gentosha
- English publisher: NA: ADV Manga
- Magazine: Comic Birz
- Original run: 1995 – 2001
- Volumes: 11

Masatsu Note: Taimashin (Japanese: 魔殺ノート 退魔針, Hepburn: Masatsu Noto Taimashin), also known as Taimashin (退魔針) is a Japanese manga written by Hideyuki Kikuchi and illustrated by Misaki Saitoh.

== Plot ==
It centers around special needles named after its series' title—Taimashin—that can control the flow of qi and exorcise evil spirits. The protagonist and a possessor of the ability to control the needles is the acupuncturist Dr. Taima, a long and red-haired Japanese man. He works with his female assistant, Maki Tagetsu, and is combating a series of paranormal events; ordinary people are being possessed and turned into demons. Taima eventually travels to the United States to discover the origins of the demonic powers but find another needle wielder, Kyogo Ayakashi.

== Release ==
Taimashin was first published by Scholar under the Scholar Comics Burger imprint from November 1995 to January 1999 into seven volumes. After Scholar's bankruptcy, the series was republished by Sony Magazines under Birz Comics imprint in July 1999. The eighth volume was also published in July 1999, and the series was concluded between April 2000 and April 2001 with the publication of three more volumes. Currently, the series rights are held by Gentosha that rereleased it between 2001 and 2002 into seven volumes with the subtitle "Special Ban". In 2007 and 2008 it was rereleased into seven bunkoban volumes.

The manga was licensed in the United States by ADV Manga under the title Notebook of a Demon Killer, Taimashin. The first volume of the English edition was released on November 9, 2004, before the license was cancelled. The manga is licensed for a French-language release in France by Taifu Comics and in Russia by Comics Factory.

A sequel series, Masatsu Note Taimashin Mashin Taidō-hen (魔殺ノート退魔針 魔針胎動篇), was published by Gentosha between 2001 and 2004 into six volumes. Later, it was republished into bunkoban format; three volumes were released in 2008.

A related series with a new protagonist, Taimashin: The Red Spider Exorcist (退魔針 紅虫魔殺行, Taimashin Akamushi Masatsukou), was illustrated by manhwa artist Shin Yong-Gwan. It was published by Media Factory's magazine Comic Flapper and between December 22, 2006, and November 21, 2009, six volumes were published in Japan. Two volumes of the series were published in English by Digital Manga Publishing on December 16, 2009, and May 10, 2010.

== Reception ==
Mania.com's Eduardo M. Chavez criticized the manga for its art and for the manga trying to be "too much at once." Manga-News criticized the series for being too cliché. They also pointed out that the action scenes are often confusing, but praised the manga for defusing its scariness through its omnipresent humor. However, they found the second set of volumes to be more effective and cited the refreshing shift in the manga's main character as a positive. Liann Cooper of Anime News Network was more positive, praising the non-clichéd characters, the artwork, character development, and "attention to detail [that] really set this one in a league of its own." Despite affirming the plot is not that good, Cooper was ultimately favorable to the series.

Manga critic Jason Thompson compared the Red Spider Exorcist unfavorably to Demon City Hunter, saying both are "nonsensical" but the fact the latter is directed towards children "makes it more enjoyable" in contrast to "a 'serious' seinen horror manga with glossy art and bare breasts and dominatrixes."
