= Hidekaz Himaruya =

Japanese manga artist

Hidekaz Himaruya 日丸屋秀和
- Born: May 8, 1985 (age 41) Kōriyama, Japan
- Area: Manga artist
- Notable works: Hetalia: Axis Powers

Hidekazu Himaruya (Japanese: 日丸屋秀和, Hepburn: Himaruya Hidekazu; born May 8, 1985), also romanized as Hidekaz Himaruya, is a Japanese manga artist best known for his manga series Hetalia: Axis Powers.

He emigrated to the United States to study at the Parsons School of Design, but dropped out. He currently lives in Japan, and is best known for writing and illustrating the web manga series Hetalia: Axis Powers, which has been adapted into manga and an anime with seven released seasons.

== Works ==
- Chibisan Date (ちびさんデイト, Chibi-san Deito) (Comic Birz → Comic Spica, Gentosha)
- Hetalia: Axis Powers (Axis Powers ヘタリア, Akushisu Pawāzu Hetaria) (Gentosha (former), Shueisha (current))
- Sōri Club (Shueisha)
