= Chibisan Date =

Japanese manga series

- Cover of the first volume

ちびさんデイト (Chibisan Deito)
- Genre: Slice of life, drama comedy
- Manga
- Written by: Hidekaz Himaruya
- Published by: Gentosha
- Magazine: Comic Birz (2009–2010); Comic Spica (2011–2013)
- Original run: February 28, 2009 – April 26, 2013
- Volumes: 4

Chibisan Date (Japanese: ちびさんデイト, Hepburn: Chibisan Deito) is a Japanese manga series written and illustrated by Hidekaz Himaruya. The series chronicles the story of Seiji Chiga, a young man from Japan studying to become an artist on the island of Nantucket, Massachusetts, and his interactions with his new friends, during the 1960s (the Shōwa period in Japan).

Chibisan Date is the second manga by Himaruya to be published, the first being Hetalia: Axis Powers, and four tankōbon were published by Gentosha Comics: the first on November 24, 2009, the second on February 24, 2012, and the third on December 24, 2012, and the fourth on June 24, 2013. In addition, it had been serialized in Comic Birz since the April 2009 issue. The series went on a year-long unannounced hiatus, with no new chapters serialized after the August 2010 issue. The series relaunched on October 28, 2011, in the first issue of Comic Spica. The series ended in the April 2013 issue of Comic Spica.

== Plot ==
Chibisan Date focuses on Seiji Chiga, a young artist studying under Mr. Suehiro, a potter, on the island of Nantucket during the 1960s. A pessimist who doubts his abilities constantly, Seiji puts pressure on himself to place better in an art competition, and as a result suffers a creative block. Passing his time with his new friends - including a young girl known only as "Chibi-san", two teenage girls from Boston, and the son of a local fisherman – Seiji faces each day overcoming some small obstacle to reach a brighter outlook on life.

== Characters ==
Seiji (セージ)
Full name Seiji Chiga (千賀星治, Chiga Seiji). The primary protagonist, he is a worrier and pessimist, though a very talented artist who likes to draw. He is also a bit eccentric.
Mr. Suehiro (末広さん, Suehiro-san)
Seji's mentor and also a potter, having immigrated to the United States from Kagoshima Prefecture. He takes care of Seiji and is a calm, hardworking man.
Chibi-san (ちびさん)
The title character of the series. A mysterious and mischievous young girl whose backstory and significance to the story remains unknown. She loves to draw.
Margaret (マーガレット, Māgaretto)
Full name Margaret Baker, Nicknamed "Meg". She is the younger of the Baker sisters. She is childish and cute, though more of a tomboy than Candy.
Candy (キャンディ, Kyandi)
Full name Candy Baker. The elder of the two Baker sisters. She is reserved and somewhat snobby, but also quite cowardly and emotional.
Fischer (フィッシャー, Fisshā)
Full name Reinhard Fischer. Seiji's best friend, who is described as understanding and caring. Though the two are total opposites in personality, their friendship seems to be quite strong.
Sujanta (スジャンタ)
Full name Rani Sujanta Sachdeva. The worker at a bookstore in Nantucket, run by Rocket's grandfather. She is a cheerful girl, yet also quite scatterbrained. Her dream is to become a successful picture book artist.
Rocket (ロケット, Roketto)
Real name Robert Wedgewood. A young boy who moved with his parents to Boston, though he currently lives at his grandparents' home. He has not shown up in the published manga yet, but in some exclusive strips of the series posted to Hidekaz Himaruya's blog. It is said that he is nicknamed Rocket due to his anger problems.
Crumb (クラム, Kuramu)
An eccentric illustrator that came from Brooklyn who is very fond of alcohol and women.

== Media ==
=== Manga ===
Written and illustrated by Hidekaz Himaruya, the Chibisan Date chapters are serialized in Comic Birz. Gentosha has collected the chapters into one bound volume so far, published on November 24, 2009. Shortly after the first chapter was released, an online-exclusive chapter entitled "Questionably Cloudy Chibi-san Came Home with a Strange Picture Book" (「微妙に曇り。ちびさんが変わった絵本持って帰ってきた」, Bimyō ni Kumori Chibi-san ga Kawatta Ehon Motte Kaettekita), focusing on the supporting character Sujanta, was posted on Hidekaz Himaruya's blog.

In January 2009, Anime News Network reported that the series would also begin serialization in Gentosha's seinen manga magazine Comic Birz starting in the April issue, though it was initially reported that Himaruya's other series Hetalia: Axis Powers would be serialized. After a year-long hiatus from 2010 to 2011, it resumed serialization with the launch of the new magazine Comic Spica. Amazon.com has listed Chibisan Date as being licensed by Tokyopop for a North American release, with the first volume released on June 28, 2011, however Tokyopop has announced the shutdown of its US publishing operations at the end of May 2011.

No.	Release date	ISBN
1	November 24, 2009	978-4-344-81806-4
1. "Clear Some of the Verbena in the Garden Have Flowered" (「晴れ。庭のバーベナが部咲いた。」, Hare Niwa no Bābena ga Busaita); 2. "Clear I Stocked Up on Paints While I Was Out" (「晴れ。ついでに絵の具補充しておいた。」, Hare Tsuide ni Enogu Honshū Shite Oita); 3. "Today I Made Cookies and Tried My Hardest Just One More" (「今日はクッキー作って、あとがんばりました。もう一個。」, Kyō wa Kukkī Tsukutte, Ato Ganbarimashita Mō Ikko); 4. "Clear the Plovers Built a Nest" (「晴れ。フエコチドリが巣を作っていた。」, Hare Fuekochidori ga su o Tsukutteita); 5. "Cloudy I'm Embarrassed I Want to Hide Somewhere" (「曇り。恥ずかしい。どこかに隠れたい。」, Kumori Hazukashii Doko ka ni Kakuretai); 6. "Clear with Occasional Rain I Want to Believe in Myself" (「晴れ時々雨が降った。自信がほしい。」, Hare Tokidoki ame ga Futta Jijin ga Hoshii); 7. "The Story of the Day I Arrived" (「来た日の話。」, Kita Hi no Hanashi)
2	February 24, 2012	978-4-344-82432-4
8. "A Day Different from the Usual" (「いつもと違うの日。」, Itsumo to Chigau no Hi); 9. "I Saw the Traveling Moon, a Happy Rabbit" (「旅生のお月様で見た、幸せなうさぎ。」, Tabi Sei no O-tsuki-sama de Mita, Shiawase na Usagi); 10. "What Kind of Person Is a Mysterious Person?" (「不思議な人ってどんなひと?」, "Fushigi na hito tte donna hito?"); 11. "Sleepless Day What to Do About My Sketchbook?" (「寝不足な日。スケッチブック、どうしよう？」, "Nebusoku na Hi Sukecchibukku, Doushiyō?"); 12. "Clear Then Cloudy I Found it Somewhat Frustrating" (「晴れのち曇り。少し悔しいと思った。」, "Hare Nochi Kumori Sukoshi Kuyashii to Omotta"); 13. "Clear I Gathered My Courage and Took a Step" (「晴れ。勇気を出して一歩進んでみる。」, "Hare Yuuki o Dashite Ippo Susundemiru")
3	December 24, 2012	978-4-344-82687-8
4	June 24, 2013	978-4-344-82855-1

=== Drama CD ===
In the July 2010 issue of Comic Birz it was announced that there would be a drama CD adaptation of Chibisan Date. However, at the time of the manga's conclusion in 2013, no further news on the CD has materialized.

== See also ==
- Hetalia: Axis Powers
