= Hetalia: Axis Powers =

Japanese manga series/anime

- Cover of the first manga volume featuring (from foreground to background): Italy, Germany, and Japan

ヘタリア Axis Powers (Hetaria Akushisu Pawāzu)
- Genre: Comedy, historical
- Manga
- Written by: Hidekazu Himaruya
- Published by: Gentosha
- English publisher: NA: Tokyopop (2010–2011); Tokyopop and Right Stuf Inc. (2012–present)
- Imprint: Birz Extra
- Magazine: Comic Birz
- Original run: 2006 – 2013
- Volumes: 6
- Manga

Hetalia: World Stars
- Written by: Hidekaz Himaruya
- Published by: Shueisha
- Imprint: Jump Comics+
- Magazine: Shōnen Jump+
- Original run: September 22, 2014 – present
- Volumes: 8
- Original net animation
- Directed by: Bob Shirohata
- Studio: Studio Deen
- Licensed by: Crunchyroll
- Released: January 24, 2009 – March 5, 2010
- Runtime: 5 minutes
- Episodes: 52
- Original net animation

Hetalia: World Series
- Directed by: Bob Shirohata
- Studio: Studio Deen
- Licensed by: Crunchyroll
- Released: March 26, 2010 – February 21, 2011
- Runtime: 5 minutes
- Episodes: 48 (plus 4 OVAs)
- Anime film

Hetalia: Axis Powers – Paint it, White!
- Directed by: Bob Shirohata
- Studio: Studio Deen
- Licensed by: Crunchyroll
- Released: June 5, 2010
- Runtime: 77 minutes
- Video game

Gakuen Hetalia Portable
- Developer: Otomate
- Publisher: Idea Factory
- Genre: Adventure game, Slice-of-life
- Platform: PlayStation Portable
- Released: March 24, 2011
- Original net animation

Hetalia: The Beautiful World
- Directed by: Hiroshi Watanabe
- Studio: Studio Deen
- Licensed by: Crunchyroll
- Released: January 25, 2013 – June 21, 2013
- Runtime: 5 minutes
- Episodes: 20
- Original net animation

Hetalia: The World Twinkle
- Directed by: Hiroshi Watanabe
- Studio: Studio Deen
- Licensed by: Crunchyroll
- Released: July 3, 2015 – October 2, 2015
- Runtime: 5 minutes
- Episodes: 15
- Original net animation

Hetalia: World Stars
- Directed by: Hiroshi Watanabe
- Written by: Kazuyuki Fudeyasu
- Studio: Studio Deen
- Licensed by: Crunchyroll
- Released: April 1, 2021 – June 17, 2021
- Episodes: 12

Hetalia: Axis Powers (Japanese: ヘタリア Axis Powers, Hepburn: Hetaria Akushisu Pawāzu) is a Japanese webcomic written and illustrated by Hidekaz Himaruya. It was adapted as a manga series, which was serialized in Comic Birz from 2006 to 2013. A dark humor genre anime adaptation, produced by Studio Deen, premiered in 2009. The series' main presentation is as a comedic allegory of political and historic events as well as more general cultural comparisons. Characters are mostly male personifications of countries, regions, and micronations, with both positive and negative cultural stereotypes forming part of each character's personality. Hetalia (ヘタリア) is a portmanteau combining hetare (ヘタレ; 'useless' or 'pathetic' in a cute or endearing way) and "Italia" (イタリア, Itaria; 'Italy').

The series started with a focus on World War II, although it has broadened beyond that. Most of the comics take place during other historical events, modern holidays, or at no specific time whatsoever. The manga and most recent season of the anime are titled Hetalia: World Stars. The series often uses satire and light-hearted comedy to reinterpret well-known events as well as less common historical and cultural trivia. Historical, political, economic, and military interaction between countries is generally represented in Hetalia as social interactions and misunderstandings between the characters.

Himaruya originally created Hetalia as a webcomic, and so far six tankōbon have been published by Gentosha Comics. The series was later adapted into drama CDs and an anime series produced by Studio Deen.

== Premise ==
Hetalia: Axis Powers draws from historical events, particularly those following World War II. It frequently reflects a Japanese perspective on political and historical matters and cultural comparisons.

The manga portrays personifications of nations and regions. Over 60 countries and territories have been depicted. These depictions draw from positive and negative cultural stereotypes.

There have also been historical figures depicted, such as (but not limited to) Maria Theresa, Roman emperors, Napoleon Bonaparte, Leonardo da Vinci and Jeanne d'Arc. There are also personifications of other figures, like General Winter, the United Nations, Italy's tanks and every country's Mr. Newspaper.

== Characters ==
=== Axis powers ===
The Axis Powers group of characters consists primarily of Germany, Italy, and Japan (the Axis powers of World War II)

- Italy Veneziano (イタリアヴェネツィアーノ, Itaria Veneziāno), usually shortened to just Italy (イタリア, Itaria) is the primary protagonist and the title character, portrayed as a bright, energetic, and mostly sweet young man. In the series, he is depicted at various points as the infant grandson of the Roman Empire and is recognized as one of the weakest characters in the series as well as a carefree and cowardly soldier who often surrenders without a fight, usually by waving a white flag. His artistry and love of pasta/pizza, and womanizing are references to stereotypical Italian culture. He is portrayed as a "loveable loser". Despite looking weak and helpless, Italy is viewed as being strong as a child, being able to defeat Turkey single-handedly during his golden days. According to Himaruya, Italy is strong, but does not show his strength because of his cowardice. In 2007, he received the name Feliciano Vargas (フェリシアーノ・ヴァルガス, Ferishiāno Varugasu). Italy Veneziano represents the northern half of the country, while his older brother Romano represents the southern half. Hence, their full character names are Italy Veneziano and Italy Romano respectively. In the anime series, both Veneziano and Romano are voiced by Daisuke Namikawa in Japanese. In English, Veneziano is voiced by Todd Haberkorn and Romano is voiced by Ian Sinclair. Young Italy, from a common segment on the show called Chibitalia, is voiced by Aki Kanada in Japanese and Brina Palencia in English.
- Germany (ドイツ, Doitsu) is portrayed as hard-working, efficient, bureaucratic, and serious. In the series Germany is depicted as the leader of the Axis Powers, and takes responsibility for the training of Italy and Japan. He is tall, muscular (Though this varies throughout the seasons.), with blond hair and blue eyes and usually wears military fatigues, uniforms, formal wear, or a collared shirt. Although he has a tendency to act aggressively to other characters he encounters (in particular Italy and Japan), he can sometimes show a kinder side to his personality. He is also an established baker. Another aspect of his character is his relative inexperience with relationships, leading him to be very by-the-book as a result of the belief that things will go wrong if he does not follow instructions to the letter. Despite this, as the series progresses, he establishes friendship with Italy and Japan. In the anime series, he is voiced by Hiroki Yasumoto in Japanese and Patrick Seitz in English. In 2007, he received the name Ludwig (ルートヴィッヒ, Rūtovihhi). It is notable that he is the only character with only a first name given out to him, although fans tend to give him the same surname (Beilschmidt) as his brother Prussia.
- Japan (日本, Nihon) is a reclusive and hard-working man. He seems to have a problem with others being in his personal space, for he gets uncomfortable if anyone touches him or gets too close, though he does seem to have gotten used to this to some extent. In the series, he is shown to be inexperienced with the Western world, and prone to culture shock; but he also finds fascination in the ways of other nations since he takes photographs of cultural oddities in other countries' lands. His character design features dark brown eyes and black hair, common physical traits among Japanese people; and has the attire of an officer of the Japanese Navy. He often tries to adopt the cultures of other countries he meets such as France, or when other countries meet him (such as America). He "senses the mood and refrains from speaking". Generally quiet, he is often depicted with the attitude of a businesslike old man. In the anime series, he is voiced by Hiroki Takahashi in Japanese and Christopher Bevins in English. Young Japan is voiced by Alexis Tipton in English. In 2007, he received the name Kiku Honda (本田 菊, Honda Kiku).

=== Allied Forces ===
The Allied Powers consist primarily of the characters America, England, France, Russia, Canada, and China. These characters are often depicted as comically failing to reach consensus in their war meetings. The representations of countries that were also part of the historical Allies of World War Two make additional appearances.

- America (アメリカ, Amerika) is an energetic young man. In the series, he was found by France and England (at first) before France left him in England's care after America chose the latter over the former, then later grows distant from him which eventually leads to him fighting for his independence. America is very similar in appearance to his brother, Canada, who is often mistaken for America. America has blond hair, starry blue eyes, glasses representing Texas, and a noticeable cowlick representing Nantucket. In the World War II sections of the anime and manga, America wears an American Army Air Force Officer uniform, and a vintage leather flight jacket. He is the self-proclaimed leader of the Allied Forces, and his catchphrase is "I'm the hero!" Although his ideas for solving international problems are often absurd, and he is usually oblivious to the opinions of others, it has been stated that he acts this way purposely. America's ideas and inventions are grand, but rarely go anywhere. He is often portrayed as loud, obnoxious, egotistical, immature, childlike and interfering with other characters' businesses with little regard for whom his actions affect. Yet despite his misgivings, he is shown to be a kind-hearted person who cares deeply for his friends. He is also shown to be extremely intelligent in several fields. He is a brave adventurer and natural explorer, wanting to try things no one has ever done before, and he usually spends his free time either trying new foods, being around friends, or making movies and has a fascination with superheroes which he aspires to be himself. He has a prominent case of phasmophobia, which is ironic considering his friendly acquaintance with an alien named Tony, who lives in his house. America is frequently seen clutching a hamburger or eating while speaking, yet he is self-conscious of his unhealthy habits and tries several yet ineffective diets to stay healthy. He also has uncanny superhuman strength, being able to lift objects several times his size. In the anime series, his voice actor is Katsuyuki Konishi in Japanese and Eric Vale in English, both of whom also voice Canada. As a child, America's voice actress is Ai Iwamura in Japanese and Luci Christian in English. In 2007, he received the name Alfred F. Jones (アルフレッド・F・ジョーンズ, Arufureddo F. Jōnzu).
- United Kingdom (イギリス, Igirisu) More commonly known as England or Britain is the personification of England and acting representation of the United Kingdom. He is depicted as an irritable man with big, bushy eyebrows drawn with five lines. While before he was a zealous privateer, he is now a cynical and sharp-tongued gentleman whose notable character traits include terrible cooking skills, inability to hold liquor, foul mouth, ability to see supernatural creatures, and (in)ability to perform magic curses. He is usually recognized for his rather large eyebrows, blond hair (more in a punk-like style), green eyes, and his green Royal Artillery Officer's uniform. In the English release of the anime, when asked why they opted to choose the name "Britain" over "England", Funimation explained that it was a request from the Japanese studio. Tokyopop, the English publisher of the manga, refers to him as "England." Britain is most antagonistic towards France, with whom he shares a long rivalry, and has strong mixed feelings towards America, whom he raised from a small child. Any matter related to the American independence makes him sick and is shown to cough up blood. In one strip, he notes that he has an older brother named Scotland. Himaruya has confirmed that England represents both the United Kingdom and England, while Scotland, Northern Ireland, and Wales are his siblings. Among England's other "relations" are Sealand, a micronation whom England considers to be an annoying little brother due to his continued attempts to get other countries to recognize him as an independent country. England's voice actor is Noriaki Sugiyama, and his English voice actor was Scott Freeman but due to sex offences, Funimation cut off all ties with him. He was replaced by Taliesin Jaffe in The World Twinkle. Taliesin did not reprise his role in the later season of "Hetalia World Stars" and the voice actor was changed to Steven Kelly. In 2007, he received the name Arthur Kirkland (アーサー・カークランド, Āsā Kākurando).
- France (フランス, Furansu) is an overly-romantic, carefree man. In the series, he is shown to have a long-held rivalry with England. He makes sexual and romantic passes at many characters. France explains away his long history of military defeats as a joke from God, but he believes he is gifted with his "charms" and his "supreme cooking skills." He regards himself as the eldest brother among the European nations and is referred to as such by some of them, though he calls Spain his elder brother in turn. Most of the time, he does not bother remembering to speak English, instead using French, the "Language of Love". He has long blond hair, clear blue eyes, and usually wears a purple cathedral cloak. In the anime series, he is voiced by Masaya Onosaka in Japanese and J. Michael Tatum in English. In 2007, he received the name Francis Bonnefoy (フランシス・ボヌフォア, Furanshisu Bonufoa).
- Russia (ロシア, Roshia) is the tallest of all the nations, and has a thick muscular body. He has short, wavy, silver hair, purple eyes, a large nose, and wears a thick winter coat and a silk scarf. Russia has a seemingly kind demeanor, but has suffered mental trauma following the strain of his bloody history, and as a result he has the innocence and cruelty of a child; sometimes he casts an aura of pure evil around him whenever such malicious thoughts enter his mind. He often terrifies the other countries without even trying, especially when he was the Soviet Union. He would abuse the Baltics and still stalks them in the modern day, especially Lithuania. Occasionally, he stalks China, while in a panda costume; and he holds a subtle rivalry with the Western nations, especially America. His primary target of resentment is General Winter, because despite using the cold to his advantage in war, he is also attacked by him every year. Russia has also been known to want Lithuania and other countries to become one with him. Russia also has two sisters: his older sister, Ukraine and his younger sister, Belarus. He becomes gloomy and depressed when either of them are on his mind, because Ukraine left him to try to make friends in the EU, and Belarus is obsessed with the idea of forcing him to marry her. Belarus seems to be the only other country which Russia fears. Russia happily promises that eventually "all will become one with Russia". He dreams of living in a warm place surrounded by sunflowers, and vodka is his fuel. He says "kolkolkol" to threaten his subordinates when he is angered. Russia is often seen carrying a metal faucet pipe. In the anime series, he is voiced by Yasuhiro Takato in Japanese and Jerry Jewell in English. In 2007, he received the name Ivan Braginsky (イヴァン・ブラギンスキ, Ivan Buraginsuki).
- China (中国, Chūgoku) is the oldest nation in the Allies, being depicted as immortal as well as being over four or five thousand years old, and is regarded as the eldest sibling among the East Asian nations. He claims he is the big brother of Japan and often he is depicted with his companion, who is a panda. His boss was introduced as a green Chinese dragon with an intimidating appearance. During the fight between the Axis and Allies, he fights Germany and Japan with a wok and ladle, which became his weapon of choice which also serves as a stereotype that China serves good food. He is a big fan of Hello Kitty and tends to end his sentences with the suffix -aru, the Japanese pronunciation of "er", a phrase sometimes added to the end of words in Chinese (see Kyowa-go). However, he replaces the customary -aru with the suffix -ahen, which means opium, when speaking to England, as a reference to the Opium Wars. He is a bit disturbed by and distrustful of Russia, reflecting Tsarist Russia invaded China and occupied Vladivostok before. In the anime series, he is voiced by Yuki Kaida (who also voices Taiwan) in Japanese and Clarine Harp in English. In 2007, he received the name Wang Yao (Chinese: 王耀; pinyin: Wáng Yào).
- Canada (カナダ, Kanada) is a part of the Allies, and he is usually forgotten about within the show. When characters notice him, they tend to think that he is his brother, America, which mostly does not end up well due to the fact that many countries dislike him. To avoid getting confused, he tattooed a maple leaf to his head, but America put an American flag on his head instead. He has a polar bear, named Kumajiro (くまじろう, translates to: white bear) who also forgets who he is. In return, Canada can never remember his bear's name, calling it other names such as Kumachika. On the Christmas special, his bear remembers his name and he states that he might have already received his gift. He is voiced by Katsuyuki Konishi in Japanese, and Eric Vale in English. In 2008, he received the name Matthew Williams (マシュー・ウィリアムズ, Mashū Wiriamuzu).

== Media ==
=== Manga ===
The original Hetalia: Axis Powers webcomic was reworked and expanded into six tankōbon and published by Gentosha Comics under the manga imprint Birz Extra. The first volume was released on March 28, 2008, the second on December 10, 2008, the third on May 20, 2010, the fourth on June 30, 2011, and the fifth on July 31, 2012. There is soon to be a seventh volume of the Hetalia manga books, although this seventh book will be the first volume of Hetalia: World Stars. Every tankōbon except the first were released as a standard edition and a special edition that included an extra small booklet. The first two volumes sold over a million copies by late 2009.

In January 2009, Anime News Network reported that the series would also begin serialization in Gentosha's seinen manga magazine Comic Birz starting in the April issue, but this was later announced to be a publishing error. The Gentosha press release on which ANN had based their article actually referred to a new series by Himaruya, Chibisan Date. Amazon.com has listed Hetalia: Axis Powers as being licensed by Tokyopop for a North American release, with the first volume released on September 21, 2010. After Tokyopop withdrew from the English language market in 2011, Right Stuf has been publishing the Hetalia manga in English since May 2012. On July 7, 2013, Tokyopop announced via their Facebook page that Tokyopop and Right Stuf are teaming up to release Hetalia Volumes 4 and 5 in Q1 2013.

No.	Original release date	Original ISBN	English release date	English ISBN
1	March 28, 2008	978-4-3448-1275-8	September 21, 2010 (NA); October 12, 2010 (UK)	978-1-4278-1876-8
2	December 10, 2008	978-4-3448-1514-8 (regular edition); ISBN 978-4-344-81535-3 (special edition)	December 28, 2010 (NA); January 11, 2011 (UK)	978-1-4278-1887-4
3	May 20, 2010	978-4-3448-1938-2 (regular edition); ISBN 978-4-344-81939-9 (special edition)	June 26, 2012	978-1-4278-5649-4
4	June 30, 2011	978-4-3448-2233-7 (regular edition); ISBN 978-4-344-82234-4 (special edition)	December 10, 2013	978-1-5703-2150-4
5	July 30, 2012	978-4-344-82563-5 (regular edition); ISBN 978-4-344-82564-2 (special edition)	December 10, 2013	978-1-5703-2151-1
6	October 31, 2013	978-4-344-82867-4 (regular edition); ISBN 978-4-344-82868-1 (special edition)	May 13, 2014	978-1-570-32152-8

=== Drama CDs ===
Hetalia: Axis Powers has been adapted into a series of drama CDs, and so far nine have been released. An independently produced CD that was recorded prior to voice casting of the anime (Axis Powers Hetalia: The CD) was released on September 14, 2008. The first official CD (Hetalia Drama CD: Prologue) was released on August 29, 2008, the second (Hetalia Drama CD: Volume 1) on October 24, 2008, the third (Hetalia Drama CD: Prologue 2) on December 29, 2008, the fourth (Hetalia Drama CD: Volume 2) on June 3, 2009, the fifth (Hetalia Drama CD Interval Vol.1: The CD Of The Awesome Me) on August 15, 2009, the sixth (Hetalia Fantasia) on August 27, 2009, the seventh (Hetalia Drama CD Interval Vol.2: Boss CD) on December 8, 2010, and the eighth (Hetalia Fantasia 2) on December 10, 2010. A ninth official drama CD based on the Gakuen Hetalia PSP game was released in 2011.

=== Anime ===
An anime adaptation of Hetalia: Axis Powers was announced on July 24, 2008. It is directed by Bob Shirohata (Gravitation, Diamond Daydreams) and is animated by Studio Deen. It was originally scheduled for broadcast on Kids Station on January 24, 2009, but was later canceled. The cancellation only affected the Kids Stations broadcasts; plans to make the series available through mobile phone and Internet streaming were not affected. The controversies arose when numerous Korean protesters called for the cancellation of the series, claiming that the personified character of Korea was an insulting representation of Koreans. Kids Station claimed that the Korea character does not appear in the anime and that it was "unaware of the criticism in Korea," and cited "various circumstances" as being behind the decision to cancel its airing of the anime, but they did not provide further information as to the nature of these circumstances.

A second 26-episode season of Hetalia: Axis Powers was announced on April 16, 2009, and a third was announced on December 10, 2009. As of March 7, 2010, the title of the anime has been changed to Hetalia: World Series. A fourth season had been announced for Hetalia and premiered on September 10, 2010. This season featured the new characters Denmark and Norway.

On January 8, 2010, Funimation announced it had acquired the rights to release the first and second seasons of Hetalia in North America. Funimation later began streaming Hetalia on their website, Hulu, and YouTube with Japanese audio and English subtitles and announced that characters would have accents in the English dub. Via Twitter, Funimation clarified that the series was rated TV-MA due to "some instances of profanity, crude humor and adult situations", and that they base ratings on entire series rather than individual episodes. The first DVD was released on September 14, 2010. Funimation have announced at Otakon 2010, that they have the license the Hetalia: World Series and will simulcast the episodes and release them on DVD in 2011. In the UK, the series will be distributed by Manga Entertainment.

Certain Animate stores will carry Hetalia-themed Purikura booths for a limited time, with a total of 10 anime sticker options.

The series has made its North American television debut on December 23, 2010, on the Funimation Channel.

The fifth season of Hetalia, titled Hetalia: The Beautiful World, was announced in the September 2012 edition of Comic Birz. It was announced that it would be produced by a new staff and utilize a new illustrative style. Romania also appeared as a new character. On June 21, 2013, Hetalia: The Beautiful World concluded. It was released in an English dubbed version on July 22, 2014, by Funimation.

A sixth season of Hetalia, titled Hetalia: The World Twinkle, was announced in the January 2015 edition of Comic Birz. It began airing in July 2015 and concluded in October 2015. It was released with an English dub on November 8, 2016, by Funimation.

An original net anime (ONA) adaptation of the Hetalia: World Stars side story manga was announced in October 2020. It aired from April 1 to June 17, 2021. Funimation licensed the series.

=== Film ===
A feature-length animated film adaptation was announced on September 23, 2009, and was released on June 5, 2010. The film is entitled Paint it, White! and the eight main characters as well as supporting characters such as Liechtenstein, Sealand, Prussia, Finland, Cuba, Hungary, Austria, Switzerland, Romano, Belarus, Ukraine, Greece, Poland, Canada, Iceland, Spain and Baltics appear throughout the film. The main plot of the movie involves a vast majority of characters being transformed into grey-white faceless aliens called Pictonians. At Otakon 2010, Funimation Entertainment announced the license of the film. The English dubbed version made its premiere at the Anime Weekend Atlanta convention, taking place from September 30 to October 2, 2011. It was released on November 22, 2011, and each DVD came with a green bandana as a bonus.

=== Video games ===
A single-player video game based on the anime titled Gakuen Hetalia Portable (学園ヘタリア Portable; lit. Academy Hetalia Portable) of the action/adventure-comic genre was released on March 24, 2011, on the PlayStation Portable in Japan. It was developed by Otomate and published by Idea Factory. A spin-off mobile game, Hetalia Chibi Carnival, was released for the iOS App Store on December 20, 2010.

=== Musical ===
A musical called "Hetalia ~Singin' in the World~" based on the manga series ran from December 24–29 at the Zepp Blue Theater Roppongi. The script was written by Yūsei Naruse, and the play was directed by Kōtarō Yoshitani. The cast included Ryōki Nagae (Legend of the Galactic Heroes, Satomi Hakkenden) as Italy, Yūichirō Ōmi (D-BOYS) as Germany, Keisuke Ueda (Yowamushi Pedal) as Japan, Ryūko Isogai as America, Daisuke Hirose as England, Juri Aikawa as France, Yūki Yamaoki as Russia, Taishi Sugie as China and Takuya Kikuchi as Austria. Another musical titled "Hetalia The Great World" ran from November 10–20, 2016, at Theatre 1010, Tokyo and November 26–27 at the Morinomiya Piloti Hall, Osaka. The "Hetalia ~Singin' in the World~" cast returned except for Yūichirō Ōmi, who was replaced by Yūsuke Ueda, and Takuya Kikuchi, whose role as Austria did not appear. The original writer, director, and composer also returned for the new production.

== Reception ==
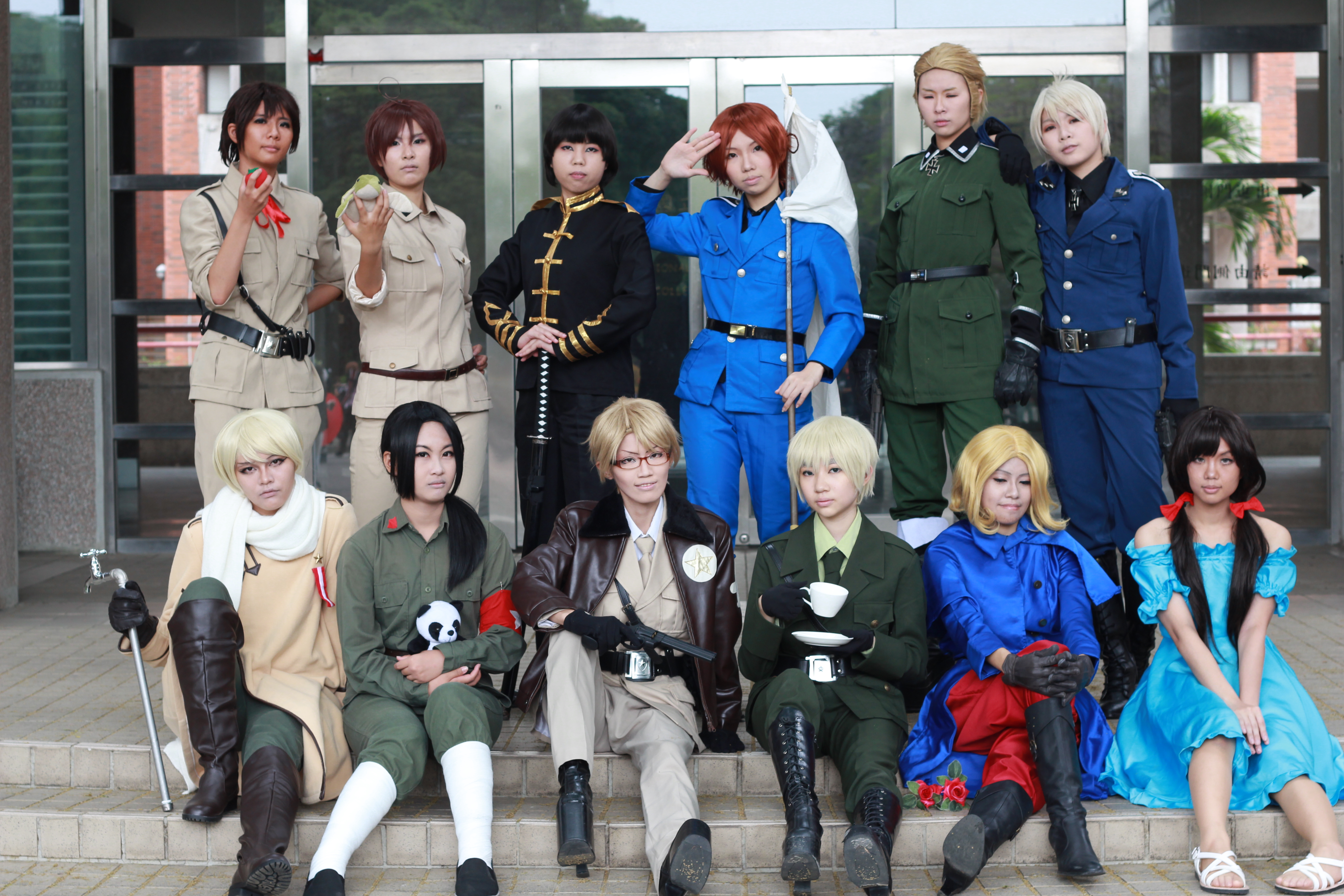
Cosplayers dressed as assorted Hetalia characters

Both volumes of the printed manga version of Hetalia: Axis Powers have topped The New York Times manga best seller list. Volume 1 topped the list on October 10, 2010, and Volume 2 topped the list on January 16, 2011. Volume 1 has been in the top ten for twenty-one weeks and Volume 2 for fourteen weeks.

Readers reviews of the British magazine NEO gave positive to mixed reviews for the anime version.

A review for the second season of Hetalia, also in NEO, by Matt Kamen gave the DVD of the season four stars, each for the program and the DVD extras. Kamen wrote that "[D]espite its risqué jokes and abundance of national stereotypes, Hetalia thankfully manages to stay on just the right side of casual comedy racism—maybe that's why we don't feel too bad laughing uproariously at the dub, particularly Japan's heavy 'Engrish' accent! It's best not to ask too many questions of this show—instead, just sit back and enjoy while Hetalia conquers your world".

Hetalia won the 2011 NEO Award for "Best Manga" in a public vote.

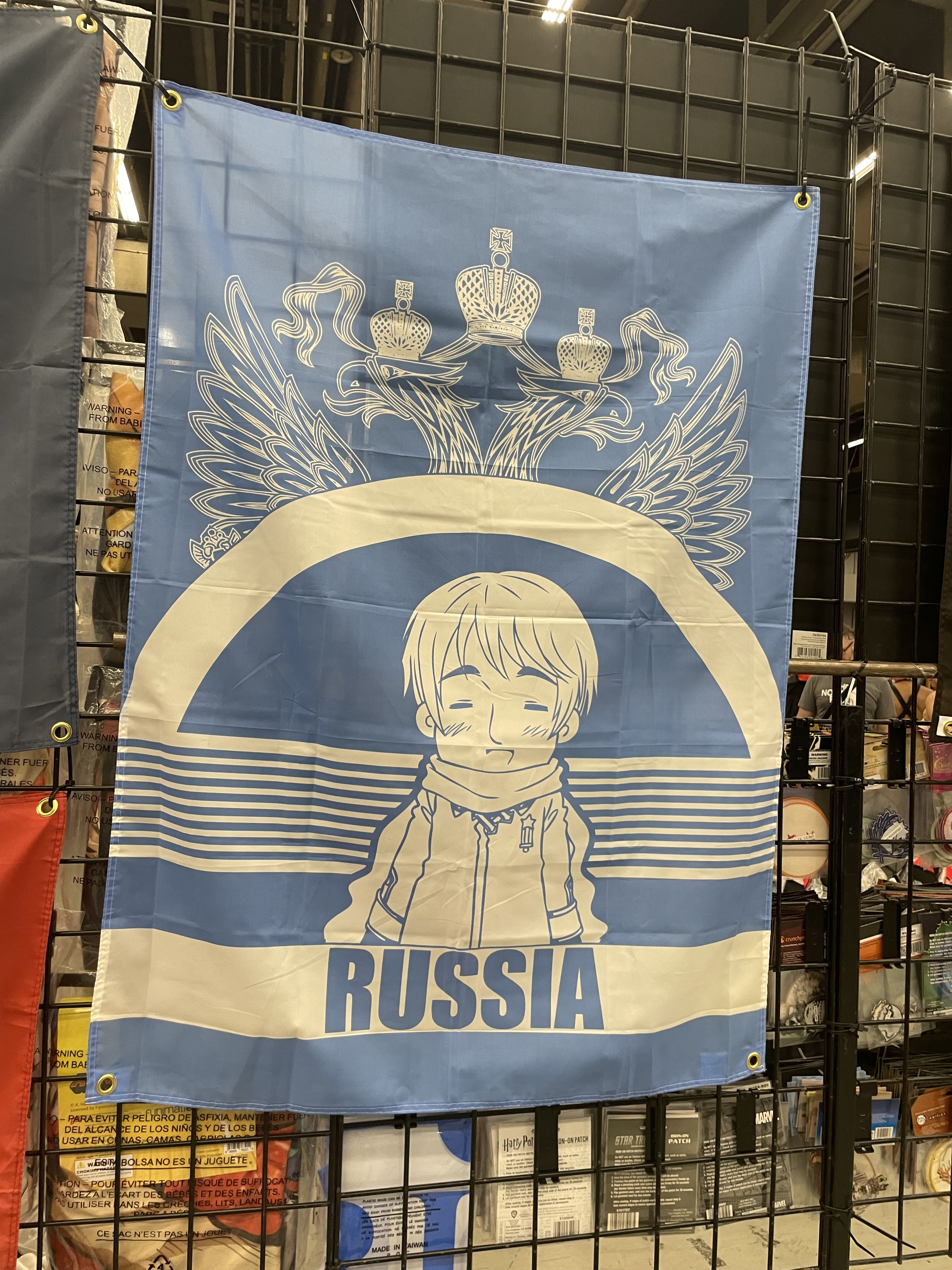
Hetalia character Russia merchandising at Otakuthon, 2023.

Fans of the series have spawned a yearly meetup titled "Hetalia Day" where fans gather at various locations to celebrate the series. The meetup started in 2009 and every year since then, coinciding with United Nations Day (October 24) or the weekend closest to it if UN Day falls on a weekday. These meetups are often found on their website, as advertised by Hetalia's official Twitter account. As of October 20, 2025, the @HetaliaOfficial Twitter account has 17.2k followers, though as of this date the account has been inactive; its last tweet was posted in 2015, and it was operated by the now defunct company Funimation.

== Controversies ==
The Hetalia fandom as well as the manga have spawned several controversies, and has received criticism from both fans and people unfamiliar with it, most notably due to the "moe" and stereotyping of countries.

The largest controversy has revolved around the Korean character. Several strips portrayed him sexually assaulting others, especially Japan. He also was portrayed as constantly copying Japan, and claiming anything he liked originated in Korea.

On January 11, 2009, in response of the anime being slated to air, and the release of promotional material with the Korean character, a petition was posted on the portal Daum calling for the anime's cancellation. It received over 12,000 signatures on the first day. Congresswoman Jeong Mi-Kyeong commented on the manga during a meeting of the Special Assembly Committee on Defensive Measures for the Liancourt Rocks. She called it a "crime against Koreans" and called for diplomatic action against Japan.

In response, the television station Kids Station claimed that the Korean character does not appear in the anime and that it was "unaware of the criticism in Korea," and cited "various circumstances" as being behind the decision to cancel its airing of the anime, but they did not provide further information as to the nature of these circumstances. Hetalia released digitally. Despite claiming Korea was not in the anime, animation errors included him.

The Korea character did not appear for 13 years after the controversy. However, in 2021, he was included in the Hetalia Collezione.

The personification of Germany has received mixed opinions from the public and fans alike, mostly being criticized for being ignorant to the country's actions or making a joke of them. In the English dub of Episode 7 by Funimation, when given a "surprise" by South Italy, Germany asks, "What is it, another Jew?" This joke does not appear in the original Japanese. There are multiple instances of similar jokes throughout the English dub. Many also disliked the representation of the other Axis powers, Italy and Japan, because they believed much of their history was glossed over, glorified, or incorrect.

There has also been an incident caused by Hetalia fans at Anime Boston 2010 relating to a group of Germany and Prussia cosplayers posing with a Nazi salute. This had sparked outrage within the fandom due to the picture allegedly being taken in the vicinity of a Holocaust memorial site, and changed many people's perception on the series itself. The organizer of this photoshoot issued an apology on the Hetalia LiveJournal group.

On 20 September 2023, Comic Book Resources ranked Hetalia: Axis Powers as the 10th most controversial anime series of all time.

== See also ==
- Afghanis-tan
- Polandball
- Patalliro!
- Year Hare Affair
- National personification
