= Tamaoki =

Tamaoki (written: 玉置) is a Japanese surname. Notable people with the surname include:

- Benkyo Tamaoki (玉置 勉強, born 1973), Japanese manga artist
- Momo Tamaoki (玉置 桃, born 1994), Japanese judoka
