= The Sword of Shibito =

Japanese manga series

- Cover of the first Japanese volume

しびとの剣 (Shibito no Ken)
- Genre: Fantasy
- Manga
- Written by: Hideyuki Kikuchi
- Illustrated by: Missile Kakurai
- Published by: Gentosha
- English publisher: NA: Central Park Media
- Magazine: Comic Birz
- Original run: 1999 – 2002
- Volumes: 8
- Manga

The New Sword of Shibito (新 しびとの剣)
- Written by: Hideyuki Kikuchi
- Illustrated by: Shiro Ohno
- Published by: Gentosha
- Original run: 2003 – 2004
- Volumes: 2

The Sword of Shibito (Japanese: しびとの剣, Hepburn: Shibito no Ken) is a manga series written by Hideyuki Kikuchi and illustrated by Missile Kakurai (加倉井ミサイル). It was serialized in the Japanese seinen manga magazine Comic Birz from 1998 until 2002. Originally, the series was released by Schola, however, the company went bankrupt in 1999. The Sword of Shibito was also licensed in English by Central Park Media and in French by 12 Bis.

The manga takes place in the Edo period of Japan.

== Characters ==
Saezuki Shibitei (冴月紫靡帝)
Resurrected from eternal slumber during the Sengoku period, Shibitei is the central figure of the saga. Initially emotionless and amnesiac, he gradually regains his memories and seeks to reshape history as a ruler.
Kinzō (金蔵)
A wandering medicine merchant who accompanies Shibitei in the early volumes. He serves as a guide and caretaker, helping Shibitei navigate the world while lacking human thought.
Yurihime (百合姫)
Shibitei's fated partner. Her presence is key to his emotional awakening. She vanishes with him into the flames at the end of the original saga, only to reappear in the sequel.
Ranken (蘭剣)
A manipulative puppeteer who revives historical figures using mechanical sorcery. He orchestrates schemes to eliminate Shibitei, including the resurrection of Oda Nobunaga.
Oda Nobunaga (織田信長)
Revived as a demonic entity by Ranken's sorcery. He becomes a major antagonist and engages in a climactic battle with Shibitei.
Takeda Shingen (武田信玄)
A powerful warlord who hosts Shibitei in Kai Province. In the sequel, he returns as a demonic adversary, confronting Shibitei once more.
Tobi Katō (飛び加藤)
A legendary ninja who joins Shibitei in the sequel series to help quell the chaos of the Sengoku era.
Sarutobi Sasuke (猿飛佐助)
Another ninja companion introduced in the sequel. He fights alongside Shibitei against supernatural threats.
Katagiri (片桐)
A wandering ronin who receives a promised land from Shibitei. He travels with a group of children and parts ways with Shibitei in Volume 5.
Two Monks (二人の僧)
Mysterious figures who obstruct Shibitei's journey. Their true identities are revealed during a pivotal confrontation.

== Media ==
=== Original Series ===
Originally, the series was published by Schola, however, the company went bankrupt in 1999, publishing only one volume, Gentosha began to publish the series from then on in Comic Birz.

#	Original release date	ISBN
1	16 September 1998	ISBN 978-4796297417 (Scholar); ISBN 978-4789781398 (Gentosha)
2	29 July 1999	ISBN 978-4789781404
3	29 January 2000	ISBN 978-4789782258
4	29 August 2000	ISBN 978-4789782913
5	27 February 2001	ISBN 978-4789783408
6	29 August 2001	ISBN 978-4789783743
7	23 March 2002	ISBN 978-4344800410
8	21 November 2002	ISBN 978-4344801561

=== The New Sword of Shibito ===
A sequel series titled The New Sword of Shibito (新 しびとの剣, Shin Shibito no Ken) was released by Gentosha and serialised in Comic Birz.

Vol.	Release date	ISBN
1	August 24, 2003	ISBN 9784344802629
2	March 24, 2004	ISBN 9784344803800

== Reception ==
Mania.com's Jarred Pine criticises the manga for its art, which is "a horrible mess". Animefringe's authors agreed and noted that "the cover art looks great and you get two pages in the manga that look excellent so it's upsetting to see this".
