= Arm of Kannon =

Japanese manga series

バース (Birth)
- Genre: Horror, sci-Fi
- Manga
- Written by: Masakazu Yamaguchi
- Published by: Gentosha
- English publisher: AUS: Madman Entertainment; NA: Tokyopop
- Magazine: Comic Birz
- Original run: 1998 – 2003
- Volumes: 9

Arm of Kannon, originally titled Birth (バース, Bāsu) in Japan, is a manga by Masakazu Yamaguchi (山口 譲司, Yamaguchi Masakazu). The series was licensed in English by Tokyopop; their version of the manga is out of print as of August 2009.

== Story ==
The "Arm of Senju Kannon" (千獣観音の触手, Senjū Kannon no Shokushu; lit. 'Tentacle of Thousand-Beasts Kannon') is a holy relic of the buddhist goddess Kannon (Kanzeon bosatsu); after the archeologist Tozo Mikami discovered it, he disappeared for three years. When he returns, his son, Mao, starts noticing something strange about him, and soon discovers that a secret military organization, Garama, is trying to unveil the secrets of the artifact to use it as a weapon.

The first four volumes of the series see Mao infected by the Arm and his rapid growth in relation to the Arm's effects. He is captured by Garama and subsequently escapes to the surrounding forest which has also been affected by Garama. Several parties try to achieve different things in the forest. The first is Mao's sister Mayo, the swordsman from Isurugi, and a monk called Kakujo. These three try to find Mao to help him overcome the Arm's infection and release him. The second group following Mao is a group called the "SDF" who are employed by the government to capture Mao alive. This group consists of four people; a male cyborg, a female soldier, a male with cybernetic eyes and sonic abilities, and a psychic man. The third group is the Manma, these are four mutants who are to kill Mao. These four are a male illusionist, a mysterious female, a man wrapped in bandages, and a gremlin-like man. These three groups face off in the forest in a race to reach Mao first.
