= Masakazu Yamaguchi =

Japanese manga artist

Masakazu Yamaguchi 山口 譲司
- Born: Fukuoka, Japan
- Area: Manga artist
- Notable works: Arm of Kannon

Masakazu Yamaguchi (Japanese: 山口 譲司, Hepburn: Yamaguchi Masakazu; born December 12) is a Japanese manga artist from Fukuoka, Fukuoka Prefecture.

== Works ==
- 0→1Rebirth (Monthly Shōnen Sirius, Kodansha)
- Arm of Kannon (Comic Birz, Gentosha)
- Blue Scanner (ブルースキャナー, Burū Sukyanā) (Scola)
- Boing (Weekly Young Jump, Shueisha)
- Butt Attack Punisher Girl Gautaman (臀撃おしおき娘 ゴータマン, Dengeki Oshioki Musume Gōtaman) (Weekly Shōnen Champion, Akita Shoten)
- Company Girl (カンパニーがぁる, Kanpanī Gāru) (Scola)
- Edogawa Rampo Ijinkan (江戸川乱歩異人館) (Business Jump→Grand Jump Premium→Grand Jump, Shueisha)
- Ex Taxi (エクスタクシー, Ekusu Takushī) (Monthly Kissca, Takeshobo)
- Fechi no Ana (フェチの穴) (Nihon Bungeisha)
- Flehmen (Kindai Mahjong Original, Takeshobo; with Nenji Miyajima)
- Fudeoroshi (筆下ろし) (Weekly Young Jump, Shueisha)
- Furin Shokudō (不倫食堂) (Grand Jump, Shueisha)
- Heart Boiled Papa (ハートボイルドパパ, Hāto Boirudo Papa) (Weekly Young Jump, Shueisha; co-work with Tadashi Ikuta)
- Joō no Ana: Queen's Hole (女王の穴 ～クイーンズ・ホール～, Joō no Ana ~Kuīnzu Hōru~)
- Keishichō Bijinkyoku (警視庁美人局) (Super Jump, Shueisha)
- Kunoichi Mahōden (くノ一魔宝伝) (Business Jump, Shueisha)
- Matakara de Sudden Death (魔宝DEサドンデス, Matakare de Sadon Desu) (Weekly Shōnen Champion, Akita Shoten)
- My My Mai (その気にさせてよmyマイ舞, Sono Ki ni Sasete yo My Mai Mai) (Weekly Shōnen Champion, Akita Shoten)
- Mystery Minzoku Gakusha Yakumo Itsuki (ミステリー民俗学者 八雲樹, Misuterī Minzoku Gakusha Yakumo Itsuki) (Weekly Young Jump→Business Jump, Shueisha; co-work with Yōzaburō Kanari)
- Seijo no Himegoto (聖女のヒメゴト) (Jitsugyo no Nihon Sha)
- Netsuretsu-teki How to Girl (熱烈的喰好ガール, Netsuretsu-teki Hauto Gāru) (Scola)
- Nishiten: Birth (螺天－BIRTH－) (Genzo, Web Spica, Gentosha)
- Oedo Honey (大江戸ハニー, Ōedo Hanī) (one-shot; Grand Jump, Shueisha)
- Okusama wa Jo Supai (奥さまは女スパイ) (Weekly Manga Goraku, Nihon Bungeisha)
- Okusama Yobikō (おくさま予備校) (Super Jump, Shueisha)
- Oshitone Tenzen (おしとね天繕) (Super Jump, Shueisha)
- Seigi no Tobira (セイギのトビラ) (Business Jump, Shueisha)
- Shake Hip (シェイク・ヒップ, Sheiku Hippu) (Mister Magazine, Kodansha)
- Shinobi Inu Zubimaro (忍犬ずびまろ) (Weekly Shōnen Champion, Akita Shoten)
- Taiyō ga Ippai (太陽がいっぱい) (Shueisha)
- To Heaven (トゥ・ヘヴン, Tou Hevun) (Kodansha)
