= Kyle Rea =

American actor

- Born: Kyle Evan Rea; September 4, 1981 (age 45); Warrenton, Oregon
- Known for: Voice acting
- Notable work: Fist of the North Star, Ultraman
- Website: kylerea.net

Kyle Evan Rea (born September 4, 1981) is an American actor, voice-actor, filmmaker and producer, known for his voice-over roles in Fist of the North Star, Ultraman, Gaiking, Dangard Ace, and Space Pirate Captain Harlock. He's acted in over 20 films, voice-acted in over 35 anime, live action and motion comic titles.

== Career ==
Rea took initial acting classes under the guidance of Amy Lyndon. In 2006, Rea won finalist recognition in the WILDsound screenplay competition for his screenplay "The Last One". In 2007, he founded Clockwork Mind Pictures, a genre production company in Los Angeles, California. Current titles under the company's belt include Good Day L.A., Egg in a Shell, Tiger Play, Billy Boy: Clown of Many Mysteries, and The Hollywood Devil, and Blood Redd which was a ShockerFest winner.

In 2009, Rea was cast in his first major voice-over role for the American dub of a Fist of the North Star anime titles by Toei Animation which was produced and directed by William Winckler Productions. Following these breakout voice-over roles, Rea was cast as several lead characters in other American dub anime films such as GeGeGe no Kitarō, Space Pirate Captain Harlock, Dangard Ace, The Adventures of Nadja, Gaiking and Starzinger.

Rea also voiced roles for the motion comic titles Karasuma Kyoko no Jikenbo and The Mythical Detective Loki. In 2017, Rea was in Japanese live action features Ultraman Zero: The Revenge of Belial for which he voiced Belial and Ultra Fight Victory for which he voiced Yapool. He also dubbed Ultraman 80 in Mega Monster Battle: Ultra Galaxy.

== Filmography ==
List of voice performances and production work in films
Year	Title	Role	Notes
2007	Twins	Johnnie Finklestein	Short Film
2007	Timothy's Fable	Troll	Short Film
2007	Opening Night	Sleeping Guy	Short Film
2007	Good Day LA	Jack	Lead actor, Co-producer
2008	The 7th Claus	Barfly	Short film
2008	Corpse Run	Kyle	Feature film
2008	Necessary Evil	Drooling Mental Patient	Feature Film
2009	Spicy Mac Project	SWAV Bread Soldier Evan	Feature Film
2009	Mega Monster Battle: Ultra Galaxy	Ultraman 80	Voice dub
2010	Zombrex: Dead Rising Sun	Additional Voices	Live action
2010	Ultraman Zero: The Revenge of Belial	Belial, Ultraman 80	Voice dub
2011	Karma	Dark Figure	Short Film
2012	The Dark Ages	Caldonia	Short Film
2012	Billy Boy: Clown of Many Mysteries	Billy Boy the Clown	Writer, director, producer
2014	Glory Days	Paramedic 1	Feature Film

== Animation ==
List of voice performances and production work in anime television series and OVAs
Year	Title	Role	Notes
2009	GeGeGe no Kitarō	Hangyojin, Youaltepuztli, Koumori Neko, Azu	Anime Feature
2009	Fist of the North Star Shin Saga	Shin	Anime Feature
2010	Space Pirate Captain Harlock	Tochiro	Anime Feature
2010	Wakusei Robo Danguard Ace	Bunta, Futoshi, Azuma, Taro	Anime Feature
2010	Wakusei Robo Danguard Ace 2	Bunta, Futoshi, Azuma, Taro	Anime Feature
2010	Wakusei Robo Danguard Ace 3	Bunta, Futoshi, Azuma, Taro	Anime Feature
2011	Yes! PreCure 5	Tiger	TV series
2011	Digimon Fusion	Carlton	TV series
2011	The Adventures of Nadja	Leonardo, Rosso	Anime Feature
2011	The Adventures of Nadja 2	Leonardo, Rosso	Anime Feature
2011	Gaiking	Yamagatake, Dankel, Bunta, Zelans	Anime Feature
2011	Gaiking 2	Yamagatake, Dankel, Bunta, Zelans	Anime Feature
2011	Gaiking 3	Yamagatake, Dankel, Bunta, Zelans	Anime Feature
2011	Starzinger	Bricke, Spider, Wolfman	Anime Feature
2011	Starzinger 2	Bricke, Spider, Wolfman	Anime Feature
2011	Starzinger 3	Bricke, Spider, Wolfman	Anime Feature
2011	GeGeGe no Kitarō 2	Azuki Togi, Koumori Neko, Poltergeist, Youalteputzli	Anime Feature
2011	Fist of the North Star The Toki Saga	Shin, Souther, Toki	Anime Feature
2011	Fist of the North Star The Souther Saga	Shin, Souther, Toki	Anime Feature
2011	Fist of the North Star The Ray Saga	Shin, Souther, Toki	Anime Feature
2011	Fist of the North Star The Raul Saga	Shin, Souther, Toki	Anime Feature
2011	Fist of the North Star The Kaioh Saga	Shin, Souther, Toki	Anime Feature
2012	Karasuma Kyoko no Jikenbo	Oni	Motion Comic
2013	The Mythical Detective Loki Ragnarok	Misao Daidouji, Nagakura the Butler	Motion Comic
2013	Otogi Zoshi (anime)	Tatsu Gaeru	Motion Comic
