= Yurikuma Arashi =

Japanese anime television series

- Promotional artwork

ユリ熊嵐
- Genre: Fantasy; Science fiction; Yuri
- Created by: Kunihiko Ikuhara; Ikuni Gomamonaka
- Manga

Yuri Bear Storm
- Written by: Kunihiko Ikuhara
- Illustrated by: Akiko Morishima
- Published by: Gentosha
- English publisher: NA: Tokyopop
- Magazine: Comic Birz
- Original run: February 28, 2014 – April 30, 2016
- Volumes: 3
- Anime television series
- Directed by: Kunihiko Ikuhara
- Produced by: Toshihiro Maeda; Oshi Yoshinuma; Yōhei Hayashi; Hayato Kaneko; Satoshi Fukao; Mari Okamoto
- Written by: Kunihiko Ikuhara; Takayo Ikami
- Music by: Yukari Hashimoto
- Studio: Silver Link (Note: Production assistance (制作協力) for all episodes provided by Lapin Track.)
- Licensed by: AUS: Madman Entertainment; NA: Funimation
- Original network: Tokyo MX, MBS, TVA, BS11, AT-X
- Original run: January 5, 2015 – March 30, 2015
- Episodes: 12
- Light novel
- Written by: Kunihiko Ikuhara; Takayo Ikami
- Illustrated by: Akiko Morishima
- Published by: Gentosha Comics
- Original run: January 19, 2015 – March 31, 2015
- Volumes: 2

Yurikuma Arashi (Japanese: ユリ熊嵐; lit. "Lesbian Bear Storm") is a Japanese yuri anime television series produced by Silver Link and directed by Kunihiko Ikuhara. The series was first announced via a website in August 2012, where it was referred to as the "Kunihiko Ikuhara/Penguinbear Project." The series first aired in Japan between January 5, 2015, and March 30, 2015, and is licensed in North America by Funimation. A manga adaptation illustrated by Akiko Morishima was serialized in Gentosha's Comic Birz magazine between February 2014 and April 2016 and has been licensed in English by Tokyopop under the title Yuri Bear Storm. The name appears to be a reference to Akira Yoshimura's novelization of the Sankebetsu brown bear incident, The Bear Storm (羆嵐, Kuma Arashi), though any more concrete link besides the presence of human-attacking bears is only speculated.

== Plot ==
The manga and anime versions have significantly different plotlines.

In the manga version, the shy Kureha meets the transfer student Ginko, who appears in her dreams as a bear princess. As Kureha becomes friends with Ginko and gets to know her, she learns that Ginko is wrapped up in her own world in which she believes everything is made up of bears.

In the anime version, humans have created a Wall of Severance to separate themselves from the bears, who grew violent and attacked humans after a far-off planet known as Kumaria exploded, turning into a meteor shower that fell upon earth. Two bears, Ginko Yurishiro and Lulu Yurigasaki, sneak through the Wall of Severance and disguise themselves as humans, enrolling in the prestigious Arashigaoka Academy and taking an interest in Kureha Tsubaki, a human girl who despises bears after her mother was killed and eaten by one.

== Characters ==
Ginko Yurishiro (百合城 銀子, Yurishiro Ginko)
Voiced by: Miho Arakawa (Japanese); Monica Rial (English)
The first titular heroine and a bear who takes human form and transfers to Arashigaoka Academy, where she sets her sights on Kureha. It is later revealed that, as a bear, she was once friends with Kureha and her mother. At the end of the story, Kureha gives Ginko her promise kiss, and the two head on a journey beyond severance; Lulu states that no one knows what has happened to them afterwards.
In the manga, Ginko sees every living thing as bears, believing Kureha to be her fated one, as Kureha is the only one who appears human to her. Ginko assumes this is because the entire world is made up of bears and only she, her mother, and Yurika can see the world for what it truly is, being descended from the royal family of the forest. However, it is later revealed that the "bear universe" is just a delusion implanted into her by her mother, Kale. She later regains her memories, remembering that Kale was responsible for the death of Reia, and tries to distance herself from Kureha.
Lulu Yurigasaki (百合ヶ咲 るる, Yurigasaki Ruru)
Voiced by: Yoshiko Ikuta (Japanese); Jamie Marchi (English)
The second titular heroine and another bear who transferred in alongside Ginko. She was once the princess of a kingdom of bears, but after her jealousy drove her little brother to his death, she decided to help Ginko fulfill her quest for the promised kiss. She is killed by the Invisible Storm while defending Ginko and reunited with her brother in the afterlife.
In the manga, she introduces herself as Ginko's childhood friend and alleged "lover" who once served under her as a maid, but Ginko apparently has no memory of this. Lulu is much more eccentric in the manga, and views Kureha as a rival for Ginko's love, though the two become friends anyway. Similar to her anime counterpart, she feels burdened over the death of her brother.
Kureha Tsubaki (椿輝 紅羽, Tsubaki Kureha)
Voiced by: Nozomi Yamane (Japanese); Alexis Tipton (English)
The main protagonist and a second year student at Arashigaoka Academy, who is in love with her friend Sumika and devastated when she is eaten by a bear. Even prior to this incident, Kureha harbors a strong hatred of bears, after her mother, Reia, was also killed by one. She is befriended by Lulu and Ginko, eventually falling in love with the latter. She and Ginko eventually share a Promise Kiss and head out on a journey beyond severance; Lulu states that no one knows what has happened to them afterwards.
In the manga, she is a shy girl who wears glasses and a ponytail. She opens up more and abandons the glasses and ponytail after meeting Ginko, who shows up frequently in her dreams as a bear person after her transfer to Arashigaoka Academy. She soon falls in love with Ginko and becomes determined to help find the cause of her suffering, while also figuring out how her mother died.
Life Sexy (ライフ·セクシー, Raifu Sekushī)
Voiced by: Junichi Suwabe (Japanese); J. Michael Tatum (English)
The presiding judge of the Life Judgement Guys, a group of bears who reside in the Severance Court (断絶のコート, Danzetsu no Kōto) between the human and bear worlds, where they hold yuri trials (ユリ裁判, yuri saiban) for Ginko and Lulu, which allow them to undergo yuri approval. He always speaks in a seductive manner, and his favourite catchphrase is "That is sexy. Shabadadoo." (それがセクシー。シャバダドゥ。, Sore ga sekushī. Shabadadu.)
In the manga, he is the student council president of Arashigaoka Academy, who is an infamous womanizer who is in love with Ginko. He, along with the other Life Judgement Guys, also appear in bear form, first in Kureha and Ginko's dreams, and later as Sumika's house. According to the second volume's omake, he and the others share the same names as their anime counterparts.
Life Cool (ライフ·クール, Raifu Kūru)
Voiced by: Mitsuki Saiga (Japanese); Christopher Bevins (English)
The bespectacled prosecutor of the Life Judgement Guys. He always speaks in a calm and collected manner, but is often flustered by the behavior of Life Beauty. His catchphrase is "[That is] cool." (何てクール, Nante kūru.)
Life Beauty (ライフ·ビューティー, Raifu Byūtī)
Voiced by: Kazutomi Yamamoto (Japanese); Jessie James Grelle (English)
The defense attorney of the Life Judgement Guys. Looking younger than the others, he speaks in a childish manner and values cuteness above everything else. His catchphrase is "Sparkle!" (キラキラァ〜, Kirakiraa~).
Sumika Izumino (泉乃 純花, Izumino Sumika)
Voiced by: Yui Ogura (Japanese); Lindsay Seidel (credited as Elaine Wagner) (English)
Kureha's classmate, friend, and lover. Her refusal to exclude Kureha along with the rest of the Invisible Storm, a group of schoolgirls who exclude those who do not follow social cues that they consider evil, gets her excluded as well. Sumika is eaten by Mitsuko early on in the story, with Mitsuko stealing her glasses as a souvenir. Later, she appears before Kureha as Lady Kumaria to turn Kureha into a bear and send Kureha and Ginko on a journey beyond severance.
In the manga, Sumika is a girl with a collection of stuffed bears who has romantic feelings for Kureha, but decides to stay her friend and aids her in helping Ginko. She is rumored to be an alleged "bear witch" who summons the souls of the dead to create living bears. When Lulu visits her, she uses some form a magic to allow Lulu to make her peace with Milne.
Yurika Hakonaka (箱仲 ユリーカ, Hakonaka Yurīka)
Voiced by: Kikuko Inoue (Japanese); Colleen Clinkenbeard (English)
A teacher at Arashigaoka Academy, who was a close friend of Reia. Yurika was a bear who grew up in Arashigaoka Academy and was befriended by Reia, but felt betrayed by Reia giving other people, especially Kureha, love, and thus ate her out of anger and jealousy after Reia lent her star pendant, the symbol of their friendship, to Ginko. Since eating Reia did not satisfy Yurika, she presently plans to thus make Kureha her "bride-in-the-box" and eat her, and manipulates several of the students to achieve this end. Though Yurika gets close to success, she ends up foiled at the last minute, killed by the Invisible Storm.
In the manga, Yurika is Ginko's paternal aunt, and the two live together. She cares a lot for Ginko's mother, and though she is frustrated by her forgetfulness and eccentricity, will use any excuse to go and visit her. She is also in a sexual relationship with Ginko's mother.
Mitsuko Yurizono (百合園 蜜子, Yurizono Mitsuko)
Voiced by: Aoi Yūki (Japanese); Caitlin Glass (English)
The class representative of Kureha and Sumika's class, and also a member of the Invisible Storm. In reality, Mitsuko is a bear as well as the one who ate Sumika, stealing her glasses as a memoir of her kill. Mitsuko is incredibly manipulative, and often uses sexual domination to get her way. She attempts to eat Kureha, but is shot by her and killed. She later appears before Ginko as the personification of her desire and attempts to seduce her into eating Kureha, but is rejected.
Mitsuko is also the class representative in the manga series. She was in middle school with Sumika and believes rumors that she is a bear witch after her friend disappeared while visiting her house.
Konomi Yurikawa (百合川 このみ, Yurikawa Konomi)
Voiced by: Ami Koshimizu (Japanese); Anastasia Muñoz (credited as Staci Moon) (English)
Kureha's classmate, another bear, who is in a relationship with Mitsuko, and also a member and the first-seen leader of the Invisible Storm. Her catchphrase, only said when she is a bear, is "Nasty!" She attempts to attack Kureha out of jealousy, but is killed after Mitsuko shoots her in the head. Her corpse is later remodeled as a cyborg by the Invisible Storm to power a large cannon. After Kureha's and Ginko's escape, she is rejected by the Invisible Storm and labelled as "defective", but is found by Uchiko, and forms a friendship together.
Katyusha Akae (赤江 カチューシャ, Akae Kachūsha)
Voiced by: Miku Itō (Japanese); Mariela Ortiz (English)
Kureha's classmate, a member and one of the leaders of the Invisible Storm. Katyusha is seen putting down with bear warning signs during an alarm in the first episode. She is later killed and eaten by Ginko and Lulu, with her iconic headband preserved, and is used to lure Eriko to the flowerbed for eating. Katyusha was the Invisible Storm leader who outed Sumika for refusing to exclude Kureha.
In the manga, she works under Yurika as a maid.
Eriko Oniyama (鬼山 江梨子, Oniyama Eriko)
Voiced by: Mariya Ise (Japanese); Felecia Angelle (English)
Kureha's classmate and a member of the Invisible Storm, as well as the second leader of the Storm, appointed as leader after Konomi's death. She is seduced and manipulated by Mitsuko into becoming the leader in order to ensure Kureha's exclusion so Mitsuko can target and eat her; however, Ginko and Lulu lure Eriko to the flowerbed and eat her as part of a plan to protect Kureha.
Eriko makes a minor appearance in the manga, having a friendly conversation with Kureha post-makeover.
Kaoru Harishima (針島 薫, Harishima Kaoru)
Voiced by: Yōko Hikasa (Japanese); Jad Saxton (English)
Kureha's classmate, a member and the third leader of the Invisible Storm. Kaoru wishes to become an important person who won't be excluded. Upon appointment as leader of the Storm, Kaoru formulates a plan to manipulate and torment Kureha, and is later revealed to have manipulated Sumika as a part of this plan, but her plan is foiled by the interference of Ginko. It is later revealed that Yurika was manipulating Kaoru to her own ends, with the two apparently also engaging in sexual activities. Yurika ends up eating Kaoru after Kaoru outlives her perceived usefulness.
So far, Kaoru has only appeared in the manga as a cameo alongside Mitsuko, where she on Lulu's bathing antics.
Choko Oki (大木 蝶子, Ōki Chōko)
Voiced by: Rie Murakawa (Japanese); Leah Clark (English)
Kureha's classmate and the fourth and final leader of the Invisible Storm, who heads up an anti-bear organization known as the KMTG to eliminate the bears. She is not beyond outright lying to get her way. She has a tendency to emphasize her words using "way" in place of "very" or "really".
Uchiko Ai (亜依 撃子, Ai Uchiko; "Uko Ai" in the Fumination sub)
Voiced by: Aina Yasukuni (Japanese); Brina Palencia (English)
Kureha's classmate and a member of the Invisible Storm, who arms and controls the beam cannon used to shoot bears. At the end of the series, she witnesses Kureha and Ginko's escape to beyond severance, thus quitting the Invisible Storm after Choko lies and tells the other Invisible Storm members of their deaths. Uchiko later finds Konomi rejected in a box by the flowerbed, labelled as "defective", and the two form a friendship. During the Invisible Storm's exclusion sessions, Uchiko is frequently seen near the top of the list.
Reia Tsubaki (椿輝 澪愛, Tsubaki Reia)
Voiced by: Aya Endō (Japanese); Cynthia Cranz (English)
Kureha's late mother, who attended Arashigaoka Academy. Reia was a kind woman who shared her love with bears as well, and encouraged her daughter to do the same. Reia was killed by Yurika after giving Ginko the star pendant that Yurika gave her as a symbol of their bond. Her death is what led to Kureha developing her present hatred of bears. Reia was also an author of picture books, one of which plays an important role in the story and Kureha's and Ginko's relationship.
In the manga, she was apparently killed and eaten by Ginko's mother.
Milne (みるん, Mirun)
Voiced by: Rie Kugimiya (Japanese); Lara Woodhull (English)
Lulu's younger brother and prince of the Bear Kingdom. Milne automatically replaced Lulu as heir of the kingdom after his birth, much to Lulu's shock and hatred, thus leading to her making several attempts on his life to reclaim the attention of the kingdom and title as immediate heir all for herself. Milne ended up dying after being stung by bees while trying to get his sister a promise kiss, but despite Lulu getting everything she wanted, she felt empty and miserable inside because of it.
In the manga, he lived with Lulu, who always looked to protect her, but was killed in a traffic accident while trying to follow her one night. He later reappears before Lulu again as a result of Sumika's magic.
Kumaria (クマリア)
Voiced by: Yui Ogura (Japanese); Lindsay Seidel (credited as Elaine Wagner) (English)
A goddess presiding over both humans and bears, taking the form of a meteor. When the meteor was destroyed, the bears rose up against the humans and her role was taken over by the Life Judgement Guys. She is once again reformed when Kureha affirms her love for Ginko, taking the form of Sumika, and turns Kureha into a bear, before sending Kureha and Ginko off onto a journey beyond severance.
Kale Yurishiro (百合城 カレ, Yurishiro Kare)
Voiced by: Mamiko Noto (Japanese); Clarine Harp (English)
Ginko's mother in the manga version. She is an eccentric and forgetful woman who lives in a foreign country due to her poor health. She is in a sexual relationship with Yurika. She is also the author of The Moon Girl and Forest Bear in the manga version. She implanted the idea of a "bear universe" inside Ginko's head for unknown reasons, and tries to encourage Ginko to eat Kureha, having apparently eaten Reia herself. She was apparently in love with Reia, allegedly killing her after she married a man.
In the anime, Kale is an allegedly male character portrayed as being played by a female actress, referred to as simply "Him" (彼, Kare) by Yurika, who looked after Yurika when she was a young cub and was killed by her upon trying to abandon her.

== Media ==
=== Printed media ===
The manga adaptation illustrated by Akiko Morishima began serialization in Gentosha's Comic Birz magazine on February 28, 2014, featuring a completely different plot to the anime series, and ended on April 30, 2016. The series was compiled into three tankōbon volumes released between November 21, 2014, and May 24, 2016. Tokyopop will release the manga adaptation in North America from January 22, 2019.

A novelization of the series, written by Ikuhara, Takayo Ikami, and Kei Takahashi and illustrated by Morishima, has been published by Gentosha Comics. The first novel was released on January 19, 2015, while the second novel was released on March 31, 2015.

==== Volumes ====
No.	Japanese release date	Japanese ISBN
1	November 21, 2014	978-4-344-83256-5
Kureha Tsubaki has strange dreams about her new classmate, Ginko Yurishiro, who she initially believes to be a bear but is proven wrong. As Ginko strives to do anything to keep Kureha safe, Kureha gets a new roommate, Lulu Yurigasaki, who claims to be Ginko's childhood friend and alleged lover, though Ginko doesn't appear to remember anything about it. Later, Ginko, who believes that the entire world is made up of bears with Kureha being the only human girl, is pressured by her mother into attempting to eat Kureha, but she finds herself unable to go through with it. After Ginko explains her situation to Kureha, Lulu reveals to Kureha that the "bear world" is a delusion placed into Ginko by her mother.
2	July 24, 2015	978-4-344-83480-4
While searching through her mother's bedroom, Ginko discovers a pendant that causes her dormant memories to reawaken. Fearing what she has learned, Ginko decides to distance herself from Kureha, who reveals she is in love with her. Kureha soon meets a bear fanatic named Sumika Izumino who, despite her own feelings for Kureha, decides to help her look into a teddy bear given to Ginko by her mother in order to find the cause of her suffering. Meanwhile, Lulu tries to make a move on Ginko but is stopped when she remembers her little brother Milne, who died in a traffic accident. Lulu soon comes across Sumika, who uses some sort of magic to reunite her with Milne and remind her of her childhood spent with Ginko. Spurred on by this meeting, Lulu goes to confront Ginko's mother, Kale, who was allegedly responsible for the death of Kureha's mother, Reia.
3	May 24, 2016	978-4-344-83711-9
Lulu decides to bring Yurika and Kale back to Japan to meet with Sumika. Along the way, Yurika and Kale recall how they both came to love Reia, only for her to wind up marrying a man she had just met. Upon arriving at Sumika's house, Yurika and Kale are met with a vision of Reia, who reminds them to keep on living, revealing that Kale was not actually responsible for Reia's death. Later, Mitsuko Yurizono confronts Sumika about the disappearance of her friend, learning that it was her own attitude that drove her away. Meanwhile, it is revealed that back when Kureha and Ginko first met, Ginko shot Reia after mistaking her for an attacker. Unable to pull Ginko out of her bear world, Kureha decides to join Ginko in her delusion. Upon learning that Reia may still be alive somewhere, Kureha and Ginko set forth on a new adventure.

=== Anime ===
Yurikuma Arashi, also referred to as the "Penguinbear Project", was first revealed by Kunihiko Ikuhara at an event held on March 23, 2013, in which brief footage was shown behind closed doors. On August 24, 2014, the official website revealed the anime would be produced by Silver Link, with character designs adapted by Etsuko Sumimoto from Akiko Morishima's originals. The series aired in Japan between January 5, 2015, and March 30, 2015. The series was licensed in North America and the United Kingdom by Funimation, who simulcast the subtitled version as it aired and streamed a broadcast dub version from March 16, 2015. The opening theme is "Ano Mori de Matteru" (あの森で待ってる, I've Been Waiting in that Forest) by Bonjour Suzuki, and the ending theme is "Territory" by Miho Arakawa, Yoshiko Ikuta, and Nozomi Yamane. The anime soundtrack was released on April 24, 2015.

==== Episodes ====
All episodes were co-written by Kunihiko Ikuhara and Takayo Ikami, who had previously collaborated on Penguindrum.

No.	Title	Storyboarder(s)	Directed by	Animation supervisor(s)	Chief animation supervisor	Original release date
1	"Never Back Down on Love" "Watashi wa Suki o Akiramenai" (私はスキをあきらめない)	Kunihiko Ikuhara, Tomohiro Furukawa	Takao Abo	Masahiro Aizawa	Etsuko Sumimoto	January 5, 2015
A long time ago, a far off planet known as Kumaria exploded, resulting in its shards falling upon Earth and causing the bears to attack the humans, resulting in a large wall being erected to separate them from the humans. In the present day, two bears, Ginko Yurishiro and Lulu Yurigasaki, disguise themselves as humans and enrol in Arashigaoka Academy, where Ginko takes an interest in a girl named Kureha Tsubaki, becoming jealous of her relationship with Sumika Izumino. When their favorite lily garden is butchered, the class president Mitsuko Yurizono offers to help Kureha and Sumika, who all become cautious when they are attacked by a brick out of nowhere. The next day, as Sumika mysteriously disappears, Kureha receives an anonymous call asking if her love for Sumika is real, leading Kureha to the rooftop where she is attacked by bears. Meanwhile, Ginko and Lulu undergo a "yuri trial" held by the mysterious Life Judgement Guys of Severance Court, who grant them "yuri approval", in which they transform into half-bear half-human form and lick nectar from a lily flower growing from Kureha's chest. As Kureha recovers, wondering if what she saw was a dream, Mitsuko discovers Ginko and Lulu in their bear forms eating a girl behind the lily garden.
2	"I Will Never Forgive You" "Kono Mi ga Tsukitemo Yurusanai" (このみが尽きても許さない)	Kunihiko Ikuhara, Tomohiro Furukawa	Yorihisa Koyada	Satomi Kurita	Etsuko Sumimoto	January 12, 2015
Sumika is declared dead, much to the shock of Kureha, while Mitsuko remains suspicious of Ginko and Lulu. Later, Ginko and Lulu show up at Kureha's house, where Ginko starts making a move on Kureha until Mitsuko shows up, aiming her gun at Ginko and Lulu. As Mitsuko chases after them, Kureha receives another anonymous call calling her to the rooftop, where another bear — who is secretly her classmate Konomi Yurikawa — attacks her, being jealous of Mitsuko's closeness to Kureha. After another yuri trial, during which Ginko and Lulu once again lick nectar from Kureha's lily, Mitsuko shows up to shoot the attacking bear. While Kureha rests from the experience, it is revealed that Mitsuko is actually a bear herself, the one who killed Sumika, and is now targeting Kureha.
3	"Invisible Storm" "Tōmei na Arashi" (透明な嵐)	Kazuo Sakai	Ayako Kawano	Mika Saitō, Yayoi Takano	Masahiro Aizawa	January 19, 2015
Kureha speaks with her teacher, Yurika Hakonaka, who was a friend of her late mother, Reia, stating her worries that there's another bear around. Meanwhile, Mitsuko sways another girl, Eriko Oniyama, into becoming the leader of a group of students known as "The Invisible Storm" to further her schemes to ensnare Kureha. As Kureha becomes determined not to forget her love for Sumika, she receives another summon to the school roof. There, she is confronted by Mitsuko, who reveals her identity as the bear who killed Sumika. With Kureha backed into a corner, Ginko and Lulu undergo yet another yuri trial in order to save her from Mitsuko, giving her the strength to shoot Mitsuko down. Later that night, Ginko and Lulu bring Eriko to the lily garden in order to eat her.
4	"I Can't Get a Kiss" "Watashi wa Kisu ga Moraenai" (私はキスがもらえない)	Katsunori Shibata	Mitsue Yamazaki	Satomi Kurita, Kaori, Kazuyuki Yamayoshi, Kazuya Hirata, Yuki Sawari	Masahiro Aizawa	January 26, 2015
The Life Judgement Guys of Severance Court explain how Lulu was once the princess of a kingdom of bears. One day, when the Kumaria meteor shower fell upon Earth, Lulu received a younger brother named Milne who took her place as first in line for the throne. Wanting to be the kingdom's favorite again, Lulu made several attempts to get rid of Milne, only for him to return each time, bringing her a "promise kiss" in the form of a jar of honey, which she would then throw away. One day, however, Milne died after being stung by bees whilst trying to get more honey, which left Lulu unhappy despite getting what she wanted. Several years later, Ginko appeared before Lulu, bringing her the honey that Milne had previously tried to give her and reminding her not to forget what she has lost. Hearing about her mission to cross the Wall of Severance and deliver her love to someone, Lulu decided to help Ginko fulfill her promise kiss and accompanied her on her journey. Back in the present, Kureha rejects Lulu's offer to look after her, stating her only friend is Sumika, while Ginko is seen with a necklace that belonged to Reia.
5	"I Want to Have You All to Myself" "Anata o Hitorijime shitai" (あなたをヒトリジメしたい)	Tōru Takahashi	Tōru Takahashi	Taketomo Ishikawa, Wakako Yoshida	Etsuko Sumimoto	February 2, 2015
As Kureha continues to reject offers of friendship from Ginko and Lulu, who move into her house, Yurika, who refuses to believe her story that Mitsuko was a bear, tells her about the necklace she once gave to Reia. Later, as Ginko recalls that 11 years ago, she was rescued by a young Kureha, Kureha shoots down another offer of friendship from her classmate, Kaoru Harishima. The next day, Kaoru offers to make things up to Kureha by getting all of her classmates to repair the lily garden for her birthday. However, Ginko and Lulu overhear Kaoru and the Invisible Storm once again plotting against Kureha. After undergoing another yuri approval, Ginko and Lulu chase after Kaoru, but Ginko gets caught by a bear trap that Kaoru had laid out in advance.
6	"The Moon Girl and the Forest Girl" "Tsuki no Musume to Mori no Musume" (月の娘と森の娘)	Takao Abo	Risako Yoshida	Miki Takihara	Etsuko Sumimoto	February 9, 2015
In a flashback, Sumika is seen writing a letter to be opened by Kureha on her birthday, reflecting on their relationship together and a book that Reia was writing before she died. Having been excluded from the Invisible Storm after not voting for Kureha to be excluded, Sumika was coerced by Kaoru to write a letter to Kureha announcing Kaoru as her new friend to protect her from the Invisible Storm. Back in the present, Lulu helps Ginko escape from Kaoru, who is seen collaborating with a secret partner who had informed her of the bears' identities. The next day, at Kureha's birthday party, Kaoru reveals she had tricked both Kureha and Sumika, setting fire to her flowerbed and throwing Sumika's letter into it. However, Ginko, despite still being injured, risks her life to protect the letter from the fire. Upon reading the letter that Ginko rescued out of love, Kureha finds new meaning in Sumika's words which tell her that the people in front of her are her new friends. At the very end, a flashback shows that Ginko was present when Mitsuko attacked Sumika, and didn't help her.
7	"The Girl that I Forgot" "Watashi ga Wasureta Ano Musume" (私が忘れたあの娘)	Kunihiko Ikuhara, Tomohiro Furukawa	Yoshiko Mikami	Yayoi Takano (humans), Yuri Nakajima (bears)	Masahiro Aizawa	February 16, 2015
Kaoru's partner turns out to be a bear, who betrays and kills her. Meanwhile, as Kureha looks after an injured Ginko, she has a strange vision about her, which leads her to recall having a friend that she had completely forgotten about. Kureha tries asking Yurika about it, learning that this friend is the one who inspired Reia's book. Meanwhile, Ginko recalls her past, in which she was an orphaned cub who was drafted into a war against the humans. After being critically injured by a gunshot and abandoned by her fellow bears, she was rescued by a young Kureha, who she called Lady Kumaria, a name also used in Reia's book. As Kureha comes to realise that Ginko was her friend that she had forgotten about, Lulu finds a threatening letter addressed to Ginko describing what crime she had committed.
8	"Bride-in-the-Box" "Hako no Hanayome" (箱の花嫁)	Shingo Kaneko	Shingo Kaneko	Mutsumi Sasaki	Etsuko Sumimoto	February 23, 2015
Twenty years ago, Yurika, revealed to be a bear, was taken in as a cub by a man only known as "Him", who taught her that she must box up her important things lest they become sullied. Eventually, Yurika ended up killing him when he tried to leave her for another unsullied thing. Having lived alone at Arashigaoka Academy since, Yurika was eventually befriended by Reia, becoming close to her and giving her a pendant as a sign of their love. However, she felt betrayed when Reia eventually gave birth to Kureha, and a few years later, Yurika killed and ate Reia after she gave her pendant to Ginko, feeling that Reia had thrown her love away. Back in the present, Kureha, who had heard Reia's pendant was taken by the bear who killed her, is shocked to find Ginko wearing it. The next day, Yurika reveals to Kureha that Ginko and Lulu are bears, claiming they were the ones who killed Reia. Later, the Life Judgement Guys call Kureha, Ginko, and Yurika to the rooftop, where Yurika tries to coerce Kureha into killing Ginko, who denies killing Reia but is willing to be shot if it will satisfy Kureha, thinking that way she will receive Kureha's love. Just as Kureha is about to give up on shooting Ginko, thinking about all the things Ginko has done for her, Lulu appears and tells Kureha about the crime that Ginko had committed concerning Sumika, prompting Kureha to shoot Ginko.
8.5	"I Want To Meet You Right Now! Growl!" "Ima Sugu, Anata ni Aitai! Gau Gau!~" (今すぐ、あなたに会いたい！ガウガウ！)	—	—	—	—	March 2, 2015
A special program hosted by voice actresses Miho Arakawa (for Ginko), Yoshiko Ikuta (for Lulu), and Nozomi Yamane (for Kureha) as they discuss their favorite moments from the previous episodes. The program also features an interview between director Kunihiko Ikuhara and theme song artist Bonjour Suzuki, as well as a preview of episode 9.
9	"The Future of the Girls" "Ano Musume-tachi no Mirai" (あの娘たちの未来)	Mitsue Yamazaki	Mitsue Yamazaki	Miki Takihara, Yuka Kudō	Masahiro Aizawa	March 9, 2015
Mitsuko, who claims to be a ghost of desire, appears before Ginko at a place known as the Door to Friendship. There they recount the events surrounding Sumika's death, in which Ginko had the chance to warn Sumika about Mitsuko's impending attack, but was held back by jealousy after hearing about her relationship with Kureha and let her die. After telling her about how Yurika manipulated Lulu into betraying her and plans to target Kureha, Mitsuko merges herself into Ginko's body, taking control of her. Meanwhile, the Invisible Storm, who have learned that Konomi was a bear and accepted Kureha into their group, suspect that there is another bear among their class. As Kureha, who shot Ginko after Lulu revealed she was Mitsuko's accomplice, is uncertain about whether Ginko was telling the truth about killing Sumika, Yurika impersonates the Life Judgement Guys to summon Kureha to the flowerbed, where she attempts to eat Kureha to fill the emptiness left inside her after eating Reia, only to be shot by the Invisible Storm students. Mistaking her for Reia in her dying breath, Yurika points Kureha towards the missing pages of Reia's picture book that she had stolen previously.
10	"The Door to Friendship" "Tomodachi no Tobira" (ともだちの扉)	Koji Sawai	Koji Sawai	Satomi Kurita, Mutsumi Sasaki, Kazuyuki Yamayoshi, Kazuya Hirata, Yuki Sawari, Kaori Satō	Etsuko Sumimoto	March 16, 2015
As the Invisible Storm convert Konomi's body into a cyborg to aid in their bear hunt, Kureha reads the rest of Reia's story, in which the moon girl and forest girl managed to meet and fulfill their love for each other. Later, Lulu comes around to bring Kureha her mother's pendant and explains why Ginko blamed herself for Sumika's death, stating it was because of her own jealousy that she betrayed Ginko. The pendant turns out to be a key which reveals a photo of Kureha, Reia, and Ginko together. As Kureha ponders why she can't remember being friends with Ginko, and whether or not she can forgive her, she and Lulu are forced to go on the run when the Invisible Storm learn Lulu is a bear and go on the hunt for her. Along the way, Lulu explains the nature of the yuri trials to Kureha, explaining that Kureha's memories of her was a price Ginko paid in order to undergo yuri approval. As punishment for revealing the secret behind her transformation, the Life Judgement Guys terminate Lulu's yuri approval, turning her back into a bear, but Kureha nonetheless remains determined to protect her. Recalling the Door of Friendship at the lily garden, which is how she first came to meet Ginko all those years ago, Kureha helps Lulu escape back to the bear world before being caught by the Invisible Storm.
11	"What We Hope For" "Watashi-tachi no Nozomu Koto wa" (私たちの望むことは)	Masayuki Kurosawa	Yūki Yase	Yuri Nakajima, Yū Shindō, Yayoi Takano, Masahiro Aizawa	Miki Takihara	March 23, 2015
Ginko recalls when she was first met Kureha. When Kureha passed out due to the cold, a mysterious being gave her a lily, encouraging Ginko to take her the rest of the way. As Kureha and Ginko spend their days being friends with each other, Kureha was bullied by her peers for her affinity towards bears. Wanting to protect Kureha, Ginko made a deal to become a human girl in exchange for Kureha's memories of her. After being sent back to the bear world by Reia, Ginko was exiled by her peers for being in love with a human, and so waited until the day she met Lulu and crossed the Wall of Severance with her. Back in the present, the Invisible Storm hold Kureha captive in order to lure out Ginko, who is being driven by Mitsuko's influence to eat Kureha. However, Ginko manages to reject Mitsuko, and thus her desire to eat Kureha, in favor of true love. On the rooftop, Kureha tries to turn Ginko away in order to protect her from snipers, but just as the sniper fires, Lulu steps in to take the hit instead, sacrificing herself to protect Ginko.
12	"Yuri Kuma Arashi" "Yuri Kuma Arashi" (ユリ熊嵐)	Kunihiko Ikuhara, Tomohiro Furukawa, Kōichi Kikuta	Tomohiro Furukawa	Etsuko Sumimoto, Masahiro Aizawa, Satomi Kurita, Daisuke Endō	Etsuko Sumimoto	March 30, 2015
The Invisible Storm prepare a public execution of Ginko using their beam cannon as a way of punishing Kureha. Kureha, understanding that Ginko was her friend all along, is summoned to Severance Court, remembering that she was the one who requested that Ginko be turned into a human on the condition that she relinquish her love of Ginko by experiencing temporary amnesia in order to prove that her crime of being prideful was false all along. As Kureha approaches Ginko and prepares to give her the promise kiss, Lady Kumaria appears from the heavens and turns out to actually be Sumika, who taught her true love for Ginko was allowing her to withstand the exclusion ceremony. Realizing her true love for Ginko, Kureha calls out to Kumaria, who acknowledges Kureha's love as the true thing and turns her into a bear so that she can confess her love to Ginko. The Invisible Storm attempts to fire upon them, but they escape beyond the Wall of Severance. Having observed what had happened, the manager of the beam cannon, Uchiko, decides to go against the Invisible Storm and becomes friends with the abandoned Konomi. It is shown that Lulu and Milne have reunited in the afterlife, and Lulu explains to Milne the ending of the storybook; then, to her surprise, Milne gave her a kiss on the cheek. Nobody has seen Kureha and Ginko since they have begun their new life together.

== Reception ==
The series has been praised as tackling the "prejudice facing gay people in Japan" while simultaneously being a "moving tale of prejudice and fear and love" which focuses on cultural treatment of all women, especially those who are lesbians, criticizes the "idealization of female innocence and purity," and serves as a study of bigotry. Further reviews praised as a well-written drama which is "densely packed with social commentary, multivalent symbolism, and references to historical events, [and] literature," is LGBT-friendly, and is "all about lesbians."
