= Tokyo Red Hood =

Japanese manga series

- Cover of first volume of Tokyo Akazukin manga

東京赤ずきん (Tokyo Akazukin)
- Genre: Ero guro, Action, Lolicon, Psychological Horror
- Manga
- Written by: Benkyo Tamaoki
- Published by: Gentosha
- Magazine: Comic Birz
- Original run: 2003 – 2004
- Volumes: 4

Tokyo Red Hood (東京赤ずきん, Tokyo Akazukin) is a Japanese manga written and illustrated by Benkyo Tamaoki. Its serialization began in the monthly Comic BIRZ in 2003. The manga is popular for its over-the-top gore and violence, and for the young main character and the different sex acts she partakes in.

== Plot overview ==
Tokyo Red Hood is about an eleven-year-old girl who usually just goes by the name of Akazukin (Little Red Riding Hood). She has a sick obsession with a being known only as Mr. Wolf and wants nothing more than to be eaten by him to end her "immortal" life. Akazukin has lost all of her memories and doesn't even know who she really is. Her reason to want to be eaten by Mr. Wolf is not even known to her, instead it's a desire that is locked deep within her consciousness.

The beings of the world are mainly made up of two forces. The people who aid Akazukin in her search for Mr. Wolf, and the people who try to keep Akazukin away from Mr. Wolf. The people of the church and disciples of God try to keep Akazukin from completing her mission to meet Mr. Wolf. Their reason for doing this is because if Akazukin is eaten by the Wolf, it would bring along an end to the world and humankind as it exists in the present day. The people whose origins are from the underworld aid Akazukin to find Mr. Wolf so the fate of the world being destroyed can be fulfilled. They mainly do this discreetly and behind the shadows.

Akazukin works as an organ harvester for an Italian butcher named Marco. From there she hunts new bodies for him and all the while trying to find Mr. Wolf. Along the way she meets villains who stand in her way from fulfilling her wish to be eaten by Mr. Wolf.

== Characters ==
Akazukin

Akazukin (Little Red Riding Hood) is a mysterious girl who considers herself immortal. She wants to be eaten by a being known as "Mr. Wolf" though it seems as if she doesn't even know what Mr. Wolf looks like. Akazukin works as an organ harvester for Marco, an Italian butcher. The police inspector noted that Akazukin killed 10 known victims in a year alone and harvested their organs. She works for Marco in exchange for a place to stay. Her powers as a whole are a mystery, but she seems to have many different kinds of powers at her arsenal. She's a good shot with a gun as she's demonstrated quite a few times throughout the manga. She can also bring people into her dream world and transform others' bodies (see: Luca). Her hair seems to be a weapon of its own as well. It can extend at will and has the power to crush a human whole. In reality, she's Astarte, the princess of the Demon World. She is also the mother of Mr. Wolf, who had been conceived as a project to restore balance in the world. Her current childlike form (when she was Astarte, she had a more adult body) is the result of being thrown out from the Demon World after Bettega tricked her and stole her son. She dies in the final pages of the story after sustaining injuries (i.e. losing her left arm and the lower half of her body) during her descent back to Earth after a confrontation with Bettega/Theos.

- Akazukin seems to be turned on by pain, making her a masochist, until she turns the tables on whoever hurts her (case in point comes during the 2nd chapter, where she kills the policemen who shot at her face and killed them with her hair).

Vivian

Vivian (more commonly Vivi) is a four armed assassin who was originally hired by Inspector Gentile to murder Akazukin. During their fight she realized she couldn't defeat Akazukin, so she instead decides to join forces with her. She takes up residence at Marco's butcher shop and accompanies Akazukin on body hunting missions. She notes that before she met Akazukin no one has ever laid eyes on her four arms. Vivi also boasts a flawless record as an assassin, although that was before she fought Akazukin. She's referred to as an "artifact" by other worldly beings. The title "artifact" is given to certain people who were failed experiments in creating an artificial host for the being Mr. Wolf. Vivian's name and occupation are contradictions in that her name means "vibrant and full of life" while her job is to take life. She would represent the hunter in the original story.

Luca

Luca was formerly an Incubus before Akazukin transformed him into a cat. As an Incubus he was flying through the skies looking for a woman to have sex with, but was having no luck because all he could find were people who already were having sex and he is only into virgins. He found Akazukin sleeping and thought she was a virgin, so he tried sleeping with her, but instead got sucked into her dream world. In Akazukin's dream world she had her way with him and after it was done, transformed him into a cat. She eventually changes him back to human form.

- Luca isn't his real name; it was a name given to him by Akazukin. His real name is unknown. He would represent a version of the Wolf in the original story, due to his constant sexual harassment/provocation of Akazukin, although the tables are always turned on him.

Asbeel

Astarte's loyal servant. When she lost her memories, Asbeel felt sad for her, and thus is forced to walk the Earth. Thanks to him, however, Astarte (as Akazukin) manages to get her memories back after she was shot in the head by Veruno. He remains loyal to her until she dies.

Lupo

A young orphan who lives in a convent. In reality, he's Astarte's son, Wolf, who Bettega had kidnapped from her. He and his mother (still in her Akazukin form) are finally re-united nearing the end of the story, where she commands her son to eat her (this coming after Lupo kills his friends and other people in the orphanage), thus becoming a huge wolf-like beast. However, this was playing right into the hands of Bettega/Theos, who wanted to create a new world. As a result, Akazukin/Astarte attacks her son, saying "You do not belong here, but don't worry; Mama will take care of it"; however, Lupo begs his mother not to leave him. During the confrontation, Lupo/Wolf, seeing his mother jump to her certain death, jumps in to try to save her, but ends up dying himself. She and her son are reunited in death in the last pages of the comic. He represents an unwitting version of the Wolf in the original story.

Bettega

Real name: Theos (God). The one responsible for Astarte being in her current form, and the one who kidnapped her son, Wolf. He's also very manipulative. At the end of the story, he dies in his car from injuries he sustained after descending to Earth. He would represent a much more crueler version of the hunter in the original story.

Marco

Marco is an Italian butcher who runs his own meat shop called Stomaco Di Ferro (Iron Stomach). He has Akazukin go out and kill people for him for their bodies and organs. This job he gave her pays off her room and board. It seems he sells the meat for it to be eaten like a normal butcher shop, but he also has various body parts decorating the walls of his shop. Marco has many different piercings and tattoos covering his body. He also has a fetish for monsters, which is confirmed when he fell in love with Vivi. He dies after an attack by a squad from heaven. He would represent the Grandmother in the story, except that Marco died without even meeting Lupo/Wolf.

Arosa

Not much is known about Arosa beside the fact that she's described as a witch and a guru by Mr. Bettega. Marco also calls her a demon in the same ranks as Akazukin. Arosa also seems to be having a budding love relationship with Mr. Bettega. She's the founder of an uprising cult that uses sacrifices from Marco's butcher shop. It's also known that she has some knowledge of magic, through which she created Veruno from various body parts. She is killed by Bettega after it was revealed that he was only using her.

Veruno

A girl necromancer created by Arosa to be her servant. She makes puppets out of human parts. She was sent to kill Akazukin, but failed and was forced to escape, but not before encountering Bettega, who blinds her. She is killed by Bettega/Theos while she was trying to protect her mistress, Arosa.

- Her name comes from a character in the Shiawase no katachi OVA called Beruno Honda.

Inspector Gentile

Inspector Fabrizio Gentile is a man who is obsessed with capturing Akazukin. He works for the police department and is always pressured for her capture because of all the crimes she has committed throughout the city. After Akazukin gives him the slip one too many times he calls in for Vivi, a four armed professional assassin to murder her. While watching their fight he realizes it's impossible to kill Akazukin and commits suicide. He is later made into a living dead puppet by the necromancer Veruno and told to fight Akazukin (ultimately used as a decoy by her to hold Akazukin down, while Veruno lines up a shot to blow Akazukin's head off; he's also rigged with explosives to incinerate Akazukin after Veruno had blown her head off), but is ultimately defeated by Asbeel. He's last seen near the end of the story in Theos's dream world, behind another door, using a self-made doll in the likeness of Akazukin/Astarte like a sex doll. Like Bettega, he would represent a much more sinister version of the hunter in the original story.

Kisa Vanitas

An intersex angel sent down with the mission to kill Akazukin (or "The girl with the black wings", as Kisa refers to her). Kisa wears wings on her arms, which are used as weapons, throwing their feathers as knives, cutting anything it touches. When she faces Akazukin, she and Luca take Kisa into Akazukin's dream world, where they rape her, thus weakening her and then transforming her into a white cat. When Luca asks if their new pet should get a name, Astarte/Akazukin responds that they don't need another pet, and that Luca would do. Having said this, Astarte proceeded to stomp on her in front of everyone, killing Kisa. She's last seen near the end of the story, trying to convince Akazukin/Astarte of Theos's intentions for his world (she says, "If you ask me, I'm fine with a world like this", whereupon Astarte, with a sneaking suspicion of what Theos is planning to do, responds "I don't want that!", and slaps her hand away, thus becoming another portal).

Dantarian

The King of the Demon World (he'd represent the Devil). The one who conceived the "Wolf" plan. He ends up being killed by Asbeel in the final chapter, this coming after several personality clashes with him.
