= Sōri Club =

Japanese manga series

- First wideban volume cover

総理倶楽部 (Sōri Kurabu)
- Genre: Comedy
- Manga
- Written by: Hidekaz Himaruya
- Published by: Shueisha
- Imprint: Jump Comics SQ.
- Magazine: Jump Square
- Original run: January 4, 2021 – October 4, 2023
- Volumes: 7

Sōri Club (総理倶楽部, Sōri Kurabu; lit. 'Prime Minister Club') is a Japanese manga series written and illustrated by Hidekaz Himaruya with storyboard composition by Ken'ichi Sakura. It was serialized in Shueisha's shōnen manga magazine Jump Square from January 2021 to October 2023.

== Synopsis ==
Daigo Hinata is concerned about his future. One day, a mysterious person invites him to the National Diet Building in Tokyo to join a secret club called the "Prime Ministers Club", where he interacts with various prime ministers across time and space.

== Characters ==
Daigo Hinata (日向大悟, Hinata Daigo)
Voiced by: Yuuki Shin (drama CD)
Itō Hirobumi (伊藤博文)
Voiced by: Yuma Uchida (drama CD)
Kuroda Kiyotaka (黒田清隆)
Voiced by: Shunsuke Takeuchi (drama CD)
Yamagata Aritomo (山縣有朋)
Voiced by: Wataru Komada (drama CD)
Matsukata Masayoshi (松方正義)
Voiced by: Atsushi Tamaru (drama CD)
Ōkuma Shigenobu (大隈重信)
Voiced by: Shin'ichiro Kamio (drama CD)
Katsura Tarō (桂太郎)
Voiced by: Soma Saito (drama CD)
Saionji Kinmochi (西園寺公望)
Voiced by: Shun'ichi Toki (drama CD)
Megane-san (メガネさん)
Voiced by: Kaito Ishikawa (drama CD)

== Media ==
=== Manga ===
Written and illustrated by Hidekaz Himaruya with storyboard composition by Ken'ichi Sakura, Sōri Club was serialized in Shueisha's shōnen manga magazine Jump Square from January 4, 2021, to October 4, 2023. Its chapters were compiled into seven wideban volumes released from April 2, 2021, to January 4, 2024.

No.	Release date	ISBN
1	April 2, 2021	978-4-08-882627-1
2	November 4, 2021	978-4-08-882827-5
3	May 2, 2022	978-4-08-883089-6
4	September 2, 2022	978-4-08-883251-7
5	January 4, 2023	978-4-08-883341-5
6	June 2, 2023	978-4-08-883546-4
7	January 4, 2024	978-4-08-883775-8

=== Other ===
A drama CD adaptation with character songs was released from October 2022 to January 2023.

== Reception ==
The series was nominated for the seventh Next Manga Awards in 2021 in the print category and was ranked 18th out of 50 nominees.
