= Furin Shokudō =

Japanese manga series

- First tankōbon volume cover

不倫食堂
- Genre: Comedy; Gourmet
- Manga
- Written by: Masakazu Yamaguchi
- Published by: Shueisha
- Magazine: Grand Jump
- Original run: April 6, 2016 – June 15, 2022
- Volumes: 21
- Television drama
- Directed by: Kensaku Sawada (S1); Tomonobu Moriwaki (S2); Toshiyuki Mitsuhashi (S2); Yuta Shimohata (S2); Toshifumi Kunitake (S2)
- Written by: Tatsuya Kanazawa
- Music by: Kenji Ise
- Original network: FOD
- Original run: March 7, 2018 – August 7, 2019
- Episodes: 8
- icon

Furin Shokudō (不倫食堂; lit. 'The Adultery Diner') is a Japanese manga series written and illustrated by Masakazu Yamaguchi. It was serialized in Shueisha's seinen manga magazine Grand Jump from April 2016 to June 2022, with its chapters collected in 21 tankōbon volumes. A web drama series, consisting of two seasons of four episodes each, premiered its first season in March 2018, and the second one from July to August 2019.

== Media ==
=== Manga ===
Written and illustrated by Masakazu Yamaguchi, Furin Shokudō was first published as a one-shot in Shueisha's seinen manga magazine Grand Jump Premium on June 24, 2015, and was later serialized in Grand Jump from April 6, 2016, to June 15, 2022. (Note: It finished in the magazine's 14th issue of 2022, released on June 15 of that same year.) Shueisha collected its chapters in 21 tankōbon volumes, released from July 19, 2016, to August 19, 2022.

==== Volumes ====
No.	Release date	ISBN
1	July 19, 2016	978-4-08-890476-4
2	November 18, 2016	978-4-08-890528-0
3	March 17, 2017	978-4-08-890669-0
4	June 19, 2017	978-4-08-890693-5
5	September 19, 2017	978-4-08-890733-8
6	February 19, 2018	978-4-08-890850-2
7	March 19, 2018	978-4-08-890871-7
8	July 19, 2018	978-4-08-891080-2
9	November 19, 2018	978-4-08-891168-7
10	March 19, 2019	978-4-08-891249-3
11	July 19, 2019	978-4-08-891332-2
12	October 18, 2019	978-4-08-891422-0
13	January 17, 2020	978-4-08-891471-8
14	May 19, 2020	978-4-08-891580-7
15	August 19, 2020	978-4-08-891633-0
16	December 18, 2020	978-4-08-891741-2
17	March 18, 2021	978-4-08-891825-9
18	July 16, 2021	978-4-08-892091-7
19	November 19, 2021	978-4-08-892153-2
20	February 18, 2022	978-4-08-892234-8
21	August 19, 2022	978-4-08-892347-5

=== Drama ===
A web drama series adaptation, starring Kei Tanaka as Ryūichi Yamadera, premiered four episodes on FOD from March 7–28, 2018. A second four-episode season, starring Shinji Takeda as Akira Hibino, premiered from July 17 to August 7, 2019.
