= Christopher Bevins =

American voice actor

- Occupations: Voice actor; ADR director; ADR script writer
- Spouse: Rachel Robinson (m. 2019)

Christopher Bevins is an American voice actor, ADR director, and scriptwriter who has worked on English language adaptations of Japanese anime shows. He dubbed roles in anime including Yasuhiro Hagakure in the Funimation dub of the Danganronpa series, Kenji from Initial D, Mercutio from Romeo × Juliet, Joe from Prison School, Life Cool from Yurikuma Arashi, Japan from the Hetalia series, Hanta Sero/Cellophane from My Hero Academia, and Shishiwakamaru from Yu Yu Hakusho.

== Personal life ==
Bevins was engaged to voice actress Rachel Robinson on October 26, 2018. They married on October 5, 2019.

== Filmography ==
=== Anime ===
List of English dubbing performances in anime
| Year | Series | Role | Crew role | Notes | Source |
|---|---|---|---|---|---|
| 2002 | Dragon Ball Z | Bee | | | |
| 2003 | Initial D | Kenji | | | |
| 2004 | Dragon Ball Z - Movie: Bojack Unbound | Bujin | | | |
| 2004 | Dragon Ball GT | Naturon Shenron | | | |
| 2004 | Dragon Ball GT | Baby Bear | | | |
| 2006 | Dragon Ball Z - Movie: Fusion Reborn | Dictator, Hitler | | | |
| | Beck: Mongolian Chop Squad | | ADR Director | | |
| | Big Windup! | Yoshiro Hamada | | | |
| | Yu Yu Hakusho | Shishiwakamaru | | | |
| | Romeo x Juliet | Mercutio | Line producer | | |
| | Witchblade | Hiroki Segawa | ADR Director | | |
| | One Piece | Laffitte, Various characters | ADR Director | | |
| | El Cazador de la Bruja | Dr. Heinz Schneider | ADR Director | | |
| | Hetalia: Axis Powers | Japan | | | |
| 2010 | Fullmetal Alchemist: Brotherhood | Ridel, Young King Bradley | | | |
| 2011 | Princess Jellyfish | Hanamori | ADR Director, ADR script writer | | |
| | Fullmetal Alchemist: The Sacred Star of Milos | Tony | | | |
| 2011 | .hack//Quantum | | ADR Director | | |
| 2011 | Rideback | Sato | | | |
| 2012 | Cat Planet Cuties | | Co-Director | | |
| 2012 | Tales of Vesperia: The First Strike | Ivan | | | |
| 2012 | King of Thorn | Peter Stevens | ADR Director | | |
| 2012 | Sengoku Basara: The Last Party | Azai Nagamasa | ADR script writer | | |
| 2012 | Shakugan no Shana | Kasha | ADR Director, Line Producer | Season 2 and S OVAs | |
| 2013 | Last Exile: Fam, the Silver Wing | | ADR Director | | |
| 2013 | Michiko and Hatchin | Hiroshi Morenos | ADR Director | | |
| 2012 | Panty & Stocking with Garterbelt | Fastener | | | |
| | Spiral: The Bonds of Reasoning | Kanone Hilbert | | | |
| 2013 | Jormungand series | Akihiko Tojo | ADR Director, Line Producer | | |
| 2013 | Aquarion Evol | Amata Sora | ADR Director | | |
| 2014 | Karneval | Yogi | ADR Director | | |
| 2014 | The Devil Is a Part-Timer! | | ADR Director | | |
| 2015 | Unbreakable Machine-Doll | Cruel | ADR Director | | |
| 2015 | Nobunagun | | ADR Director | | |
| 2015 | Mikagura School Suite | Tonkyun | | | |
| 2015 | Yurikuma Arashi | Life Cool | ADR Director | | |
| 2015 | Ping Pong the Animation | | ADR Director | | |
| 2015 | Danganronpa: The Animation | Yasuhiro Hagakure | ADR Director | | |
| 2015 | The Heroic Legend of Arslan | Narsus | ADR Director | | |
| 2015 | Yona of the Dawn | Gang Tae-jun | | | |
| 2015 | Gangsta. | Ivan Glaziev | ADR Director | | |
| 2015 | Harmony | Elijah Vashlov | | | |
| 2015 | Heavy Object | | ADR Director | | |
| 2016 | Terror in Resonance | Arata "Nine" Kokonoe | ADR Director | | |
| 2016–2025 | My Hero Academia | Hanta Sero | | | |
| 2016 | Endride | Ralph | | | |
| 2016 | Trickster | Kaijin Nijuu Mensou | | | |
| 2016 | Drifters | Grigori Rasputin | | | |
| 2016 | Alderamin on the Sky | Bada Sankrei | | | |
| 2016 | Aquarion Logos | Chinosuke Domon | | | |
| 2016 | Tokyo ESP | Washibana | | | |
| 2016 | Grimgar of Fantasy and Ash | Hayashi | | | |
| 2016 | Garo: The Animation | Capi | | | |
| 2016 | Servamp | Misono Alicein | | | |
| 2017 | Dragon Ball Z Kai | Bee | | | |
| 2017 | Dragon Ball Super | Bee, Dr. Paparoni, Agnilasa | | | |
| 2018 | JoJo's Bizarre Adventure: Diamond is Unbreakable | Tonio Trussardi, Kira's colleague | | | |
| 2019 | The Disastrous Life of Saiki K.: Reawakened | Takumi Iguchi | | | |
| 2020 | Case Closed Episode One: The Great Detective Turned Small | Wataru Takagi | | | |
| 2021 | Magatsu Wahrheit Zuerst | Fritz | | | |

=== Video games ===
List of English dubbing performances in video games
| Year | Series | Voice role | Crew role | Notes | Source |
|---|---|---|---|---|---|
| 2004 | Dragon Ball Z: Budokai 3 | Bee | | | |
| 2009 | Street Fighter IV | Dhalsim | | | |
| 2010 | Super Street Fighter IV | Dhalsim | | | |
| 2012 | Street Fighter X Tekken | Dhalsim | | | |
| 2016 | Street Fighter V | Dhalsim | | | |
| 2018 | Fire Emblem Heroes | Legault, Dieck | | | |
| 2019 | Pokémon Masters | Koga, Brycen, Swimmer | | | |
| 2020 | Dragon Ball Z: Kakarot | Bee | | | |
| 2021 | Dragon Ball Legends | Bujin | | | |
| 2021 | Scarlet Nexus | Additional voices | | | |
