= Darkside Blues =

Manga and anime

- DVD cover of Darkside Blues

ダークサイド・ブルース (Dākusaido Burūsu)
- Genre: Action, Fantasy, Science fiction
- Manga
- Written by: Hideyuki Kikuchi
- Illustrated by: Yuho Ashibe
- Published by: Akita Shoten
- English publisher: NA: ADV Manga
- Magazine: Candle
- Original run: September 1988 – December 1988
- Volumes: 2
- Anime film
- Directed by: Nobuyasu Furukawa
- Written by: Mayori Sekijima
- Music by: Kazuhiko Toyama
- Studio: J.C.Staff
- Licensed by: NA: ADV Films (expired), Central Park Media (former)
- Released: October 8, 1994
- Runtime: 83 minutes

Darkside Blues (Japanese: ダークサイド・ブルース, Hepburn: Dākusaido Burūsu) is a manga series by Hideyuki Kikuchi. The story has been adapted into an anime film directed by Yoshimichi Furukawa. The film was originally licensed by Central Park Media and then later licensed by ADV Films.

== Storyline ==
The story involves the town of Kabuki-cho, home of a resistance faction called Messiah. In the futuristic setting, Kabuki-cho is one of the last places of freedom because the Persona Century Corporation has taken control of the majority of the Earth. Kabuki-cho is hence known as "The Dark Side of Tokyo". Furthermore, a mysterious stranger called Darkside appears to protect the citizens of Kabuki-cho.

== Characters ==
Dark Side (ダークサイド, Dāku Saido)
When he meets Mai and the others, he asks about the name of the place, and is told it is Shinjuku Kabukicho, also known as "Dark Side," so he calls himself Dark Side.
He opens a clinic that he calls "Dream Treatment." However, he says it is not treatment but "correction."
Katari (カタリ)
A resident of Kabukicho. He treasures a small sphere that looks like crystal, and rarely speaks. It seems that he has been corrected by the Dark Side, and Mai had never seen his bright expression when he left. Mai calls him "the kid next door."
In the last scene of the movie, he shows a sinister expression that suggests a sequel, but this is not depicted in the original manga.

=== Messiah ===
A "delinquent group" that makes Kabukicho, Shinjuku Ward its base.

Mai (舞衣)
Leader of Messiah. He moves at super high speeds that leave afterimages, and uses a high-powered laser bracelet.
He was once raped by Guren. He denied the trauma and even tried to convince himself that it was love. And that wound was not a target for Dark Side's "fixing".
Kenzo (ケンゾー, Kenzō)
He looks like a big man with a good physique (the person whose face is the most different between the original manga and the movie), but his specialty is electronics. In the story, he makes missile launchers from cardboard and missiles (with anti-sensor systems) from tin. He is also good at fighting and uses bone magic.
He is actually in love with Mai. He calls Dark Side "Kabukicho".
Chris (クリス, Kurisu)
A knife user. He has a technique called "Dead Man's Knife" that allows him to deflect incoming anti-personnel missiles with a knife and send them back.
Celia (セリア, Seria)
A former nurse. She was a member of Messiah but left. While hiding Tatsuya, she is drawn to his passion and beliefs. She has a past where she suffered the loss of her family when her father was a more active AP member and her family home was targeted from orbit.

=== P.C ===
Persona Century (ペルソナ・センチュリー, Perusona Senchurī)
A megacorporation that owns 90% of the land on Earth. At the end of the story, they purchase the Himalayan mountain range from the United Nations and destroy the AP base hidden there along with the surrounding residents as part of a "terrain modification project."
Houzuki Lando (法月蘭土(ほうづき らんど), Hōdzuki Rando)
President of P.C., known as the Demon King (Lucifer).
Houzuki Guren (法月紅蓮(ほうづき ぐれん), Hōdzuki Guren)
The eldest son of the Houzuki family, known as the Evil Man.
Houzuki Enji (法月炎血(ほうづき えんじ), Hōdzuki Enji)
The second son of the Houzuki family, known as the Crusher.
Can eat earth and turn living things around him to stone. Purely loves fighting, and challenges the dark side to a fight.
Hozuki Tamaki (法月たまき, Hōdzuki Tamaki)
Miss Strangler
She tortures the terrorists (AP) she catches to make them talk.
Hozuki Sayo (法月小夜, Hōdzuki Sayo)
She is said to be the only "sane" member of the Hozuki family.
Kuroumi (黒海(くろうみ), Kuroumi)
She is in charge of the P.C. Japan branch. She is rumored to wear a suit and a pitch black mask because her skin melts when exposed to sunlight.
In the movie version, this was a disguise for Kuren.

=== AP ===
It is pronounced "AP" literally. It stands for Anti-Persona Century. They do not approve of the rule of the P.C. and conduct a resistance. The members are called AP men. It seems to have a long history, and the song sung by Yumeyo Old Man in the movie is well known as an anti-persona song.

Tatsuya (達也)
Although they infiltrated the "P.C" headquarters, it was a trap, and the other members were either killed or captured, leaving only Tatsuya behind.
His body is covered in countless scars from his fight with P.C. that never heal.
He has vowed not to shed a tear, even if his family is killed, until he has defeated P.C.

== Release ==
The manga was published by Akita Shoten into two volumes between September 1988 and December 1988. The series was rereleased three times in special one-volume editions: on November 22, 1993; on May 10, 2002; and on March 16, 2012.

Darkside Blues was adapted into a film by J.C. Staff under the direction of Yoriyasu Kogawa and based on a script by Mayori Sekijima. It was released theatrically by Toho on October 8, 1994. U.S. Manga Corps. licensed it for a North American audience and first released it in VHS on May 6, 1997.

== Reception ==
Helen McCarthy in 500 Essential Anime Movies calls the film "one of the most atmospheric films" of the 1990s. She praises the design, but states that "the luxuriant designs are almost outdone by the well-crafted background track, with some superior foley editing and jazzy, atmospheric music".
