= Karasuma Kyoko no Jikenbo =

Japanese manga series

- Second volume cover of Karasuma Kyoko no Jikenbo

烏丸響子の事件簿 (Karasuma Kyōko no Jikenbo)
- Genre: Detective, science fiction, supernatural
- Manga
- Written by: Oji Hiroi
- Illustrated by: Yūsuke Kozaki
- Published by: Gentosha
- Magazine: BStreet; Monthly Comic Birz
- Original run: 2002 – February 29, 2012
- Volumes: 10

Karasuma Kyoko no Jikenbo (Japanese: 烏丸響子の事件簿, Hepburn: Karasuma Kyōko no Jikenbo; lit. "The Case Files of Karasuma Kyoko") is a Japanese manga series written by Oji Hiroi and illustrated by Yūsuke Kozaki. The series follows the detective of the same name as she faces supernatural cases. It was originally serialized by Gentosha in the magazines BStreet and Monthly Comic Birz from 2002 to 2012. The series was collected into ten volumes and was published in several countries. In 2013, an English-language motion comic adaptation was produced and released online.

== Plot ==
Karasuma Kyoko no Jikenbo is set in Asakusa, Tokyo in the year 2050, where entities known as Oni, ogres of Japanese mythology, live alongside humans. Once worshiped by people, these creatures were relegated to live in the margin of society. However, as they get tired of such life they start to live among humans, becoming influential economic and political leaders. With power and anger accumulated, the Oni united under the OOO (Organization of Ogrecide), decide to break a millennial pact signed with humans, and declare war on them.

The main character of the series is the 16-year-old detective of the same name, Kyoko Karasuma (烏丸響子, Karasuma Kyōko), who has supernatural powers, including superhuman speed. She works for the Asakusa Police Department's special unit that investigates supernatural cases and combats the Oni along with Raymond Kumano (レイモンド 熊野, Reimondo Kumano).

== Release ==
Written by Oji Hiroi and illustrated by Yūsuke Kozaki, Karasuma Kyoko no Jikenbo was first published as part of Gentosha's BStreet manga anthology in 2002. It was then serialized in Gentosha's Monthly Comic Birz seinen magazine from 2003 to February 29, 2012. Gentosha compiled all individual chapters and published into ten tankōbon volumes from September 24, 2003, to March 30, 2012.

Outside Japan, the serie was also published in Czech Republic by Zoner Press, France by Taifu Comics, in Germany by Carlsen Comics, in Italy by Ronin Manga, in Indonesia by Elex Media, in Russia by Comix-ART, and in Taiwan by Ever Glory Publishing.

=== Volume list ===
No.	Japanese release date	Japanese ISBN
1	September 24, 2003	978-4-344-80286-5
2	August 24, 2004	978-4-344-80441-8
3	April 24, 2005	978-4-344-80548-4
4	January 24, 2006	978-4-344-80674-0
5	December 22, 2006	978-4-344-80883-6
6	December 22, 2007	978-4-344-81162-1
7	December 24, 2008	978-4-344-81504-9
8	December 24, 2009	978-4-344-81799-9
9	December 24, 2010	978-4-344-82106-4
10	March 30, 2012	978-4-344-82462-1

== Motion comic ==
In February 2013, Karasuma Kyoko no Jikenbo was adapted by Happinet and the Inception Media Group into a "Manga 2.5"—a motion comic with English voice acting, sound effects, animation, motion, and coloring. Along with The Mythical Detective Loki, it was the first Manga 2.5, which were released to the iTunes Store in the United States, Canada, the United Kingdom, Australia, New Zealand, Hong Kong, and South Africa. Directed by Keiji Korogi and produced by Haruo Kawashima, the series was released into 8 chapters for a total of 86 minutes. Crunchyroll announced they would make the motion comic available on its streaming site in May 2014.

=== Cast ===
- Alexa Kahn as Kyoko Karasuma
- Nate Joyner as Raymond Kumano
- Larry Butler as Kozo Mitamura
- Bryan Forrest as Kirio Uchida
- Caleb Pearson as Shoichi Ise
- David Gerrold as Vice chief Kunimitsu

=== Episode list ===
No.	Title
1	"The Oni Feast (1)"; Transliteration: "Oni Matsuri (1)" (Japanese: 鬼祭り(1))
2	"The Oni Feast (2)"; Transliteration: "Oni Matsuri (2)" (Japanese: 鬼祭り(2))
3	"Kamikakushi (1)" (Japanese: 神隠し(1))
4	"Kamikakushi (2)" (Japanese: 神隠し(2))
5	"Shadow of Decadence (1)"; Transliteration: "Kire yo, Waizatsuna Yami o (1)" (Japanese: 斬れよ、猥雑な闇を(1))
6	"Shadow of Decadence (2)"; Transliteration: "Kire yo, Waizatsuna Yami o (2)" (Japanese: 斬れよ、猥雑な闇を (2))
7	"Invasion of Abnormalities"; Transliteration: "Itan-tachi no Shinkō" (Japanese: 異端たちの侵攻)
8	"The Second Defeat"; Transliteration: "Nidaime no Haiboku" (Japanese: 二度目の敗北)
