= Hideyuki Kikuchi =

Japanese novelist

- Born: 25 September 1949 (age 77); Chōshi, Chiba, Japan
- Occupation: Author
- Writing career
- Genres: Horror, fantasy

Hideyuki Kikuchi (菊地 秀行, Kikuchi Hideyuki; born September 25, 1949) is a Japanese author known for his horror novels. His most famous works include the Vampire Hunter D series, Darkside Blues and Wicked City.

== Biography ==
Kikuchi was born in Chōshi, Japan on September 25, 1949. He attended Aoyama Gakuin University and was trained as a writer by famed author Kazuo Koike. His first novel, Demon City Shinjuku, was published in 1982. While his first novels are typical novel prose, as he gained fame, he adopted a more terse writing style.

Kikuchi became close friends with writer and director Yoshiaki Kawajiri during his adaption of Wicked City and the two have since collaborated on Vampire Hunter D: Bloodlust and the OVA of Demon City Shinjuku.

== Works ==
=== Novels ===
==== Demon City Shinjuku series ====
The series takes place in a world where Shinjuku has been turned into a city of demons and monsters, and follows a young man named Kyoya Izayoi, user of the mystical art of Nempo, who must discover how the disaster relates to his own family.

1. Demon City Shinjuku (魔界都市＜新宿＞, Makai Toshi Shinjuku) (published September 30, 1982)
2. Demon Palace Babylon (魔宮バビロン, Mamiya Babiron)
3. Trickster Johnny (騙し屋ジョニー, Damashiya Jyoni)
4. The Fang Family's Hunter (牙一族の狩人, Kiba Ichizoku no Karyudo)
5. Underground City Shinjuku (地底都市〈新宿, Chitei Toshi Shinjuku)
6. The Legend of the Mad Soldier (狂戦士伝説, Kyo Senshi Densetsu)
7. Demon Doctor Mephisto (魔界医師メフィスト, Makaishi Mefisuto) (published May 11, 1988)

==== Demon City Nowaru series ====
This story follows Fuyuharu Aki, Setsura Aki's cousin.

1. Flattery Goku King (媚獄王, Kobi Goku O)
2. Demon Incense Transcript (魔香録, Ma Ko Roku)
3. Evil Moon Mask (兇月面, Warugetsu Men)

==== Treasure Hunter series ====
A series of young adult fiction novels (also called the Alien Series for use of "alien" in each title), the story follows a seemingly ordinary high schooler named Dai Yagashira, who journeys around the world collecting rare and supernatural treasures. A member of ITHA (International Treasure Hunters Association) and heir to a family of treasure hunters, Yagashira fights soldiers, private militia, and fellow treasure hunters using both high-tech weapons and powerful artifacts. While the original illustrations were provided by Yoshitaka Amano (with the exception of the illustrations by Masahiro Shibata for "Black Death Empire"), the illustrations in the bound volumes are by Koichiro Yonemura.

1. Alien‐Hidden Treasure Town (エイリアン秘宝街)
2. Alien‐Monster Zone 1 (エイリアン魔獣境1)
3. Alien‐Monster Zone 2 (エイリアン魔獣境2)
4. Alien‐Apocalypse Record (エイリアン黙示録)
5. Alien‐Monster Cat Tale (エイリアン怪猫伝)
6. Alien‐Otherworldly Journey by Sea (エイリアン魔界航路)
7. Alien‐Mystic Mountain Chronicle (エイリアン妖山記)
8. Alien‐Treacherous Sea Tale (エイリアン邪海伝)
9. Alien‐Luoyang Strange Tales (エイリアン京洛異妖編)
10. Alien‐God's Country (first volume) (エイリアン魔神国 上巻)
11. Alien‐God's Country (second volume) (エイリアン魔神国 中巻)
12. Alien‐God's Country (third volume) (エイリアン魔神国 下巻)
13. Alien‐God's Country (Conclusion 1) (エイリアン魔神国 完結編1)
14. Alien‐God's Country (Conclusion 2) (エイリアン魔神国 完結編2)
15. Alien‐God's Country (Conclusion 3) (エイリアン魔神国 完結編3)
16. Alien‐Noble God's Castle (エイリアン蒼血魔城)
17. Alien‐Black Death Empire (first volume) (エイリアン黒死帝国 上巻)
18. Alien‐Black Death Empire (second volume) (エイリアン黒死帝国 下巻)

==== Others ====
- Invader Summer (インベーダー・サマー) (published August 30, 1983, with illustrations by Yoshitaka Amano)
- A Wind Named Amnesia (風の名はアムネジア) (published October 31, 1983, with illustrations by Yoshitaka Amano)
- Evil Deity Gourmet (妖神グルメ) (published on June 30, 1984, with illustrations by Yoshitaka Amano, republished in February 2000)
- Meiji Dorakyuu Den (published in United States as Dark Wars: The Tale of Meiji Dracula)

Invader Summer and A Wind Named Amnesia were republished together in one volume in August 2005, with illustrations by Eiji Kaneda.

=== Manga ===
- Darkside Blues
- Demon Palace Babylon
- Vampire Hunter D
- Taimashin
- Taimashin – Masatsu Note
  - Masatsu Note Taimashin Toudouhen (sequel to Taimashin – Masatsu Note)
- Taimashin: Akamushi Masatsukou
- Shibito no Ken
  - Shin Shibito no Ken (sequel to Shibito no Ken)
- Makai Toshi Hunter
  - Makai Toshi Hunter Series: Makyuu Babylon (side story)
  - Makai Toshi <Shinjuku> (side story)
- Blue Rescue
- Alien Hihouden
- Jashin Sensen Risutora Boy
- Makai Ishi Mephisto
- Majin Keiji
- Makai Gakuen
- Mokushiroku Senshi
- Rappa (SASAKURA Kou)

=== Novelizations ===
- Leda: The Fantastic Adventure of Yohko (幻夢戦記レダ Genmu Senki Leda)

=== Short stories ===
- D – Armageddon
- Portrait of Ixobel
- D – Village in the Fog
- D – Castle Dweller
- D – Night on the Highway
- A Message from Cecil
- D – Throng of Heretics

== See also ==
Category:Novels by Hideyuki Kikuchi
