= Benkyo Tamaoki =

Japanese manga artist

Benkyo Tamaoki (玉置勉強, Tamaoki Benkyō) is a Japanese manga artist. He was born in Shinjuku. His books The Sex Philes, Blood the Last Vampire 2000, and Tokyo Akazukin have all been translated into English (although one of these is a fan translation).

== Works ==
- The Sex Philes (Eros Comix)
- Blood the Last Vampire 2000 (Kadokawa, Viz)
- Tokyo Red Hood (Gentosha)
- Necromanesque (Gentosha)
