= Gentosha =

Japanese publishing company

Gentosha Inc. (株式会社幻冬舎, Kabushiki-gaisha Gentōsha) is a Japanese publisher, headquartered in Shibuya, Tokyo. Gentosha publishes manga magazine Monthly Birz, web comic magazines GENZO, SPICA, Comic MAGNA, literary magazines Lynx, Papyrus, as well as business magazine GOETHE.

== Publications ==
- GOETHE, business magazine geared towards men.
- Papyrus, literary and cultural magazine.
- Monthly Birz, monthly seinen manga magazine published by Gentosha Comics, a subsidiary of the company.
- GENZO, monthly seinen web comic published by Gentosha Comics on the 28th of each month.
- SPICA, monthly shōjo web comic published by Gentosha Comics.
- Comic MAGNA, monthly shōnen web comic published by Gentosha Comics on the 28th of each month.
- Lynx, bi-monthly literary magazine published by Gentosha Comics on the 9th of every odd month.
