= Kakeru Kobashiri =

Japanese light novelist

Kakeru Kobashiri 虎走 かける
- Born: 1986 (age 39–40); Tokyo
- Education: The Open University of Japan
- Occupations: Novelist, video game scenario writer
- Writing career
- Period: Since 2014
- Genres: Fantasy, light novel
- Notable work: Grimoire of Zero series
- Notable awards: 20th Dengeki Novel Prize (2013)
- Website: ちらうら

Kakeru Kobashiri (虎走かける Kobashiri Kakeru, born 1986) is a Japanese novelist and game scenario writer. She is from Tokyo, Japan and graduated from the Open University of Japan. In 2013, she won the 20th Dengeki Novel Prize for the Grimoire of Zero.

== Career ==
Kobashiri grew up in downtown Tokyo. In Japanese class in elementary school, she was assigned to read Hideyuki Kikuchi's novel Demon City Blues which inspired her to start writing. From a young age, she was deeply fascinated by medieval European paraphernalia, and with the influence from foreign juvenile novel series such as the Bartimaeus Sequence, The Saga of Darren Shan, and The Seventh Tower, Kobashiri decided to become a fantasy novelist.

When she submitted her work for the 15th Dengeki Novel Prize, it reached the second round before being rejected. A few years later, Kobashiri's submission to a female-orientated label reached the final round. Under the name Koketa Kobashiri (虎走こけた, Kobashiri Koketa), she submitted Grimoire of Zero for the 20th Dengeki Novel Prize and won it. After changing her pen name to Kakeru Kobashiri, she debuted as a novelist under this name on 10 February 2014. Grimoire of Zero received a manga adaptation in December of the same year, in October 2015 a spinoff manga started publishing, and the series received an anime adaptation in 2017. Grimoire of Zero finished publishing in December 2017 with 11 volumes.

In August 2018, under Kodansha's LIGHT NOVEL imprint, Kobashiri started publishing a sequel to her previous work called The Dawn of the Witch. Just like its predecessor, it received a manga adaptation and an anime adaptation was announced in 2021.

In 2019, she was in-charge of writing the main scenario for the mobile game Kurosu × Rogusu (クロス×ロゴス).

== Personal life and writing style ==
Kobashiri has said she enjoys classic adventure stories and romantic comedies, and that Grimoire was her way of writing a combination of both. Being that Grimoire had a therianthropic protagonist and her work generally being filled with such characters, many speculate that Kobashiri particularly enjoys kemonomimi. However, she denies this rumor, stating "what interests her most is the dynamic found in human-nonhuman relationships" which she says extends to human-robot and human-monster relationships also. Kobashiri likes video games, and reading children's literature, picture books, manga, and movies, and has stated that Grimoire was influenced by novels such as The Lord of the Rings, The Saga of Darren Shan, Kino's Journey, and Slayers, as well as manga such as Bastard!! and Berserk. As a technical high school graduate, where she was the only female student in her class, she says she cannot write novels based on school life.

In describing her how she writes, Kobashiri says that she first creates the characters before molding the setting and storyline around them. In addition, she says she is always conscious of her prose's rhythm and the tempo of her story, being careful not to distract the reader with minutiae, especially during dialogue, and avoids using difficult words and kanji as much as possible.

== Works ==
=== Novel series ===
- Grimoire of Zero (ゼロから始める魔法の書) (Illustrated by Yoshinori Shizuma, published by Dengeki Bunko, 11 volumes, 2014–2017)
- The Dawn of the Witch (魔法使い黎明期) (Original characters by Yoshinori Shizuma, illustrated by Takashi Iwasaki, published by Kodansha LIGHT NOVEL, 4 volumes, 2018–2022)

==== Other ====
- World End Eclipse ~Chops no Yūtsū~ (ワールド エンド エクリプス 〜チョップスの憂鬱〜) (Online short story, February 2016)
- Faust 8: Eien no Eliza (永遠のエリザ) (Kodansha KC Deluxe, September 2018)
- Succubus Idol no Keiyakusha Bokkuko Succubus to Himitsu no Roomshare (サキュバスアイドルの契約者 ボクっ娘サキュバスと秘密のルームシェア) (Published by Kodansha LIGHT NOVEL, October 2019)

=== Game Scenarios ===
- Yuiitsusei Million Arthur (唯一性ミリオンアーサー) (Social network game, some scenarios, 2013)
- Tokyo Afterschool Summoners (東京放課後サモナーズ) (Social network game, some scenarios, 2018)
- Kurosu × Kogosu (クロス×ロゴス) (Social network game, main scenario, 2019)

== See also ==
- Dengeki Bunko
- Dengeki Novel Prize
