= Demon City Shinjuku =

1982 novel by Hideyuki Kikuchi

- Cover art for the novel

魔界都市 (新宿) (Makai Toshi: Shinjuku)
- Genre: Fantasy horror
- Novel
- Written by: Hideyuki Kikuchi
- Published by: Asahi Sonorama
- English publisher: NA: Digital Manga Publishing
- Published: 1982
- Original video animation
- Directed by: Yoshiaki Kawajiri
- Produced by: Kenji Kurata; Makoto Seya
- Written by: Kaori Okamura
- Music by: Motokazu Shinoda
- Studio: Madhouse
- Licensed by: NA: Discotek Media (digital & home video); Sentai Filmworks (digital)
- Released: 25 October 1988
- Runtime: 80 minutes
- Manga
- Written by: Hideyuki Kikuchi
- Illustrated by: Shinichi Hosama
- Published by: Akita Shoten
- English publisher: NA: ADV Manga
- Original run: 27 June 2002 – 26 September 2002
- Volumes: 2
- icon

Demon City Shinjuku (Japanese: 魔界都市〈新宿〉, Hepburn: Makai Toshi: Shinjuku) is a novel by Hideyuki Kikuchi that was adapted into an original video animation (OVA) in 1988, directed by Yoshiaki Kawajiri. The title has also been translated as Hell City Shinjuku and Monster City. It was also released as two manga by ADV Manga in 2003 and 2004. The novel was also released in English in 2011 by Digital Manga Publishing, compiled with its sequel Demon Palace Babylon.

The film was released in North America by Central Park Media in 1993. Portions of the opening fight scene were featured in the 1995 cyberpunk film Johnny Mnemonic.

== Plot ==
Demon City Shinjuku begins with a battle between former friends, the evil Rebi Ra (known in Japan as Levi Ra) versus the short-lived hero Genichirou. Rebi Ra has allowed himself to be possessed in order to gain the incredible powers of evil and plans to summon demons to conquer the world. Defeating Genichirou and destroying Shinjuku, a part of Tokyo, with a devastating earthquake, the area becomes a demon-haunted wilderness. The novel does not have a fight scene between Genichirou and Rebi Ra. It opens with a quiet time in Shinjuku and then in a sudden change the Demon Quake hits only Shinjuku.

Ten years later, the World President, put in place to uphold world peace, is attacked by Rebi Ra with cursed plants indirectly to keep his old master, Aguni Rai, as the protector of the president, occupied. However, Rebi Ra did not know that Genichirou had a son who inherited his powers and more. After an emotional plea from the president's daughter, Sayaka Rama, the unlikely hero Kyoya Izayoi follows her deep into the heart of the evil city, finding new allies and terrifying enemies along the way. In the novel Aguni Rai asks the Information Bureau Japan Section Chief to look for Kyoya as the only one who could stop Rebi Ra.

The Section Chief tests Kyoya with a commando cyborg and then relates to Kyoya that the president is in a life-threatening curse and only has three days to defeat Rebi Ra before the president is killed as the ritual sacrifice to bring the Demon Realm to Earth, which he failed to do years prior, causing the Demon Quake. During the course of explanation Aguni Rai uses a doppelganger to communicate to Kyoya from New York in hopes of convincing him to save the world. Sayaka soon enters and pleads with him to do so as well. Kyoya finally decides to help because of Sayaka's pleas.

== Cast ==
Character	Japanese	English
Kyōya Izayoi	Hideyuki Hori	Bradley Lavelle
Sayaka Rama	Hiromi Tsuru	Teresa Gallagher
Rebi Ra / Levi Ra	Kiyoshi Kobayashi	Bob Sessions
Chibi	Kyoko Tongu	Alex McSweeney
Mephisto	Yusaku Yara	Gareth Armstrong
Master Rai	Ichirō Nagai	George Little
President Kozumi Rama	Osamu Saka	Brian Note
Genichirō Izayoi	Banjo Ginga	Unknown
Hag	Takeshi Aono	Sharon Holm
Rapist	Koji Totani	Unknown
Yin	Asami Mukaidono	Unknown
Water Demon	Naoki Tatsuta	Unknown
Earth Demon	Hirohiko Kakegawa	Unknown
TV Anchor	Kazumi Tanaka	Harry Ditson
Waitress	Arisa Ando	Sharon Holm
Little Girl	Junko Hagimori	Teresa Gallagher

== Production ==
The film took two years to produce and had a budget of 130 million yen. It was also additionally screened in movie theaters in Hong Kong.

== Reception ==
Hyper's Daniel Wilks criticised the film for having "only vaguely interconnected action scenes punctuated by some rather dull talkiness marred by horrible accents (the heroine is unconvincingly British and the childish sidekick speaks with a mangled Mexican drawl)".

== Related works ==
Demon Palace Babylon is the direct sequel to Demon City Shinjuku written six years later in 1988 and follows Kyoya, Sayaka, and Mephisto as they battle against King Nebachanezzar and his four knights. This was released in the United States in a complete edition with Demon City in 2011. It was also released as two manga by ADV Manga back in 2003 and 2004. 7 novels have been published in Japan as of 2017.

Demon City Hunter is a series of 17 manga released in Japan that follows Kyoya, Mephisto, and Sayaka after the events of Demon City Shinjuku. ADV Manga published two of these in English but did not finish them.

Demon City Blues is a set of five novels that is based in the Demon City universe and has Mephisto reappearing but with a new hero, Setsura Aki. Setsura is a P.I. specializing in missing persons, but now he and Mephisto must go up against a group of vampires, led by a "Demon Princess", who plan on making Shinjuku a vampire metropolis.

The Demon City Shinjuku Role-Playing Game was published by Guardians of Order in 2000. It uses the Tri-Stat System and was written by David L. Pulver.
