= Masaaki Mizunaka =

Japanese voice actor

- 水中 雅章
- Born: 20 January 1990 (age 36)
- Occupation: Voice actor
- Years active: 2014–present
- Employer: Production Baobab
- Notable work: How Not to Summon a Demon Lord as Diablo; Namu Amida Butsu! Rendai Utena as Taishakuten; Raven of the Inner Palace as Kōshun Ka; Sugar Apple Fairy Tale as Shalle Fen Shalle; The Café Terrace and Its Goddesses as Hayato Kasubake

Masaaki Mizunaka (水中 雅章, Mizunaka Masaaki; born 20 January 1990) is a Japanese voice actor. He is affiliated with Production Baobab. He is known for starring as Koreo in Brave Beats, Kakeru Ryūen in Classroom of the Elite, Diablo in How Not to Summon a Demon Lord, Taishakuten in Namu Amida Butsu! Rendai Utena, Kazami in Gundam Build Divers Re:Rise, Keisuke Baji in Tokyo Revengers, Poncho Panacotta in How a Realist Hero Rebuilt the Kingdom, Kōshun Ka in Raven of the Inner Palace, Shalle Fen Shalle in Sugar Apple Fairy Tale, Hayato Kasukabe in The Café Terrace and Its Goddesses, and Zion Alster in Wistoria: Wand and Sword.

== Biography ==
Mizunaka, a native of Iwakuni, Yamaguchi Prefecture, was born on 20 January 1990. He was captain of the basketball team in junior high school despite being only 138cm. He considered working at a zoo during his youth, but after seeing Hōchū Ōtsuka's performance of Danny Tanner in the Japanese dub of the American sitcom Full House, he became interested in a voice acting career. He then graduated from Yoyogi Animation Academy's Hiroshima campus.

In 2014, Mizunaka starred as Choreo in Brave Beats. He later starred as Kakeru Ryūen in Classroom of the Elite, Diablo in How Not to Summon a Demon Lord, Taishakuten in Namu Amida Butsu! Rendai Utena, and Kazami in Gundam Build Divers Re:Rise. In 2021, he played Keisuke Baji in Tokyo Revengers and Poncho Panacotta in How a Realist Hero Rebuilt the Kingdom, and in 2022, he was cast as Kōshun Ka, a main character in Raven of the Inner Palace. In 2023, he starred as Shalle Fen Shalle in Sugar Apple Fairy Tale and Hayato Kasubake in The Café Terrace and Its Goddesses, and in 2024, he was cast as Zion Alster in Wistoria: Wand and Sword and Divock in Code Geass: Rozé of the Recapture.

Mizunaka speaks the Yamaguchi dialect. He is a friend of Brave Beats co-star Kōdai Sakai.

== Filmography ==
=== Anime series ===
| Year | Title | Role(s) | Ref |
|---|---|---|---|
| 2014 | Case Closed | Emergency personnel | |
| 2014 | Nisekoi | Male student | |
| 2015 | Brave Beats | Choreo | |
| 2015 | Haikyu!! | Kazumitsu Akiu | |
| 2015 | Shin Atashin'chi | Handsome manga man | |
| 2016 | Alderamin on the Sky | Shishindi | |
| 2016 | B-Project | Cameraman | |
| 2016 | Drifters | Carneades soldier | |
| 2016 | Heybot! | Gakran | |
| 2016 | Lostorage Incited WIXOSS | Male student | |
| 2016 | Mobile Suit Gundam: Iron-Blooded Orphans | Tekkadan member | |
| 2017 | Alice & Zoroku | Subordinate | |
| 2017 | Classroom of the Elite | Kakeru Ryūen | |
| 2017 | Sword Oratoria | Blacksmith | |
| 2017 | Tomica Hyper Rescue Drive Head Kidō Kyūkyū Keisatsu | Shou | |
| 2018 | How Not to Summon a Demon Lord | Diablo | |
| 2018 | Phantom in the Twilight | Subordinate B | |
| 2018 | Rascal Does Not Dream | Yōsuke Maezawa | |
| 2018 | Sword Art Online Alternative Gun Gale Online | Lux | |
| 2019 | Bungo Stray Dogs | Shirase | |
| 2019 | Kengan Ashura | Ryō Himuro | |
| 2019 | Namu Amida Butsu! Rendai Utena | Taishakuten | |
| 2020 | Ahiru no Sora | Hiroshi Usami | |
| 2020 | Is It Wrong to Try to Pick Up Girls in a Dungeon? | Lido | |
| 2020 | Noblesse | Urokai Agbain | |
| 2021 | How a Realist Hero Rebuilt the Kingdom | Poncho Panacotta | |
| 2021 | Skate-Leading Stars | Rui Renjō | |
| 2021 | That Time I Got Reincarnated as a Slime | Roy Valentin | |
| 2021 | Tokyo Revengers | Keisuke Baji | |
| 2022 | The Dawn of the Witch | Priest | |
| 2022 | Golden Kamuy | Private First Class Ariko | |
| 2022 | Raven of the Inner Palace | Kōshun Ka | |
| 2023 | Giant Beasts of Ars | Clunes | |
| 2023 | Sacrificial Princess and the King of Beasts | Gleipnir | |
| 2023 | Sugar Apple Fairy Tale | Shalle Fen Shalle | |
| 2023 | The Café Terrace and Its Goddesses | Hayato Kasukabe | |
| 2023 | The Duke of Death and His Maid | Zachou | |
| 2023 | The Vexations of a Shut-In Vampire Princess | Belius Innu Cerberus | |
| 2024 | Cardfight!! Vanguard DivineZ 2nd Season | Kyohma Kurosaki | |
| 2024 | Failure Frame | Takuto Kirihara | |
| 2024 | Wind Breaker | Yukinari Arima | |
| 2024 | Wistoria: Wand and Sword | Zion Alster | |
| 2024 | Goodbye, Dragon Life | Geolude | |
| 2024 | Trillion Game | Nagase | |
| 2025 | Sakamoto Days | Lu Wutang | |
| 2025 | The Brilliant Healer's New Life in the Shadows | Aston | |
| 2025 | Can a Boy-Girl Friendship Survive? | Hibari Inuzuka | |
| 2025 | Night of the Living Cat | Kunagi | |
| 2025 | The Banished Court Magician Aims to Become the Strongest | Ornest Rain | |
| 2025 | Reincarnated as the Daughter of the Legendary Hero and the Queen of Spirits | Raviselle | |
| 2025 | My Status as an Assassin Obviously Exceeds the Hero's | Kyosuke Asahina | |
| 2026 | Tamon's B-Side | Wataru Fujita | |
| 2026 | Hana-Kimi | Megumi Tennōji | |
| 2026 | Petals of Reincarnation | Pol T. | |
| 2026 | Overgeared | Toban | |
| 2026 | Full Clearing Another World Under a Goddess with Zero Believers | Michio Fujiwara | |
| 2027 | Nabe ni Tama o Ukenagara | Juntarō (male) | |
| 2027 | Tsugumi Project | Leon | |

=== Anime films ===
| Year | Title | Role(s) | Ref |
|---|---|---|---|
| 2018 | Maquia: When the Promised Flower Blooms | Jack | |
| 2024 | Code Geass: Rozé of the Recapture | Divock | |

=== Original net animation ===
| Year | Title | Role(s) | Ref |
|---|---|---|---|
| 2019 | Gundam Build Divers Re:Rise | Kazami | |
| 2026 | Steel Ball Run: JoJo's Bizarre Adventure | Sandman | |

=== Video games ===
| Year | Title | Role(s) | Ref |
|---|---|---|---|
| 2016 | Afterlost | Kuro Coat | |
| 2018 | A3! | Suga, pursuer, theatre police officer | |
| 2018 | Atelier Online: Alchemists of Bressisle | Silverbirch | |
| 2019 | Fire Emblem Heroes | Rutger | |
| 2019 | Namu Amida Butsu! Rendai Utena | Taishakuten | |
| 2021 | Granblue Fantasy | Wilnas | |
| 2023 | Helios Rising Heroes | Luca Reinhart, Kai Reinhart | |
| 2025 | Fatal Fury: City of the Wolves | Cristiano Ronaldo | |
| 2027 | Honkai: Nexus Anima | Hyperius | |
