= Raven of the Inner Palace =

Japanese light novel series

- First light novel volume cover

後宮の烏 (Kōkyū no Karasu)
- Genre: Historical fantasy; Mystery; Supernatural
- Light novel
- Written by: Kōko Shirakawa
- Illustrated by: Ayuko
- Published by: Shueisha
- English publisher: NA: Seven Seas Entertainment
- Imprint: Shueisha Orange Bunko
- Original run: April 20, 2018 – April 21, 2022
- Volumes: 7
- Anime television series
- Directed by: Chizuru Miyawaki
- Written by: Satomi Ooshima
- Music by: Asami Tachibana
- Studio: BN Pictures
- Licensed by: Crunchyroll
- Original network: Tokyo MX, GYT, GTV, BS11, Kansai TV
- English network: US: Crunchyroll Channel
- Original run: October 1, 2022 – December 24, 2022
- Episodes: 13
- icon

Raven of the Inner Palace (Japanese: 後宮の烏, Hepburn: Kōkyū no Karasu) is a Japanese light novel series written by Kōko Shirakawa and illustrated by Ayuko. Shueisha have published seven volumes from April 2018 to April 2022 under their Shueisha Orange Bunko imprint. The series is set in a fictional world based on ancient China.

An anime television series adaptation produced by BN Pictures aired from October to December 2022.

== Characters ==
Liu Shouxue (柳 寿雪, Ryū Jusetsu)
Voiced by: Saku Mizuno (Japanese); Alexis Tipton (English)
At sixteen years of age, she is the latest successor to the title of "Raven Consort." She lives at the Ye Ming Palace deep in the inner palace; and despite her title of Consort, she does no nighttime duties, and has no contact with the Emperor. She uses mysterious arts to perform things such as calling forth spirits of the deceased and exorcising and purifying them to rest in peace in Paradise. Despite the fact that she should live her days in seclusion with only her niaobu (familiar), a golden-yellow chicken named Xing-Xing (she calls him the "Watchman of Niao Lian"), she is accompanied by a lady-in-waiting and a few servants inside her residence. And despite her tsundere attitude, she cannot resist when being served baozi, her favorite food.
She is the last surviving member of the Luan Family, the previous dynasty known for their silver hair. A powerful man named Yandi had them exterminated due to false accusations of treason, including her mother, who had her dye her silver hair black; and their ghosts haunted him until he died. Orphaned, she was driven into slavery until the previous Raven Consort chose her and groomed her to be her successor. Only Emperor Gaojun, Wei Qing, and the people inside Ye Ming Palace know she dyes her hair black, and keep it secret as Emperor Gaojun promised not to kill her. Eventually, the death warrant on all survivors of the Luan is repealed. She learns she harbors the very essence of "the Raven" herself deep within her and she is gradually becoming consumed by her deep pain and rage.
Emperor Xia Gaojun (夏 高峻, Ka Kōshun)
Voiced by: Masaaki Mizunaka (Japanese); Christopher Wehkamp, Reshel Mae (young) (English)
The current emperor. After being disinherited as a child after his mother was murdered, he seized power in an uprising against the corrupt Empress Dowager and had her executed later. He has a semi-cordial relationship with Shouxue, vowing to protect her and release her from such a fate by any means. In the anime he is implied to have romantic feelings for her.
Wei Qing (衛青, Ei Sei)
Voiced by: Taku Yashiro (Japanese); Lee George (English)
Emperor Gaojun's attendant. He is a bit callous when talking to Shouxue but nevertheless treating her with respect and changed later on.
Formerly known as Que Er, who was orphaned when his mother committed suicide, and was tricked into a life of a male prostitute after trying to become an eunuch. Running away, the young Gaojun sheltered him and took him in as his attendant, and gave him his new name.
Jiu-jiu (九九)
Voiced by: Marika Kōno (Japanese); Bryn Apprill (English)
The cheerful lady-in-waiting to the current Raven Consort. Shouxue met her while snooping around in disguise outside of the Ye Ming Palace while working on a case, and later took her in as her lady-in-waiting.
Wen Ying (温螢, On Kei)
Voiced by: Nobunaga Shimazaki (Japanese), Alejandro Saab (English)
An eunuch assigned by Wei Qing to protect Shouxue. He made himself known to her when she and Jiu-jiu were attacked by the former Empress Dowager's men.
Dan Hai (淡海, Tan Kai)
Voiced by: Nobuhiko Okamoto
Another of Emperor Gaojun's assistants, but acting as his eyes and ears outside of the inner palace. He is laid-back most of the time, but is competent in his duties.
Yisiha (衣斯哈, Ishiha)
Voiced by: Mana Hirata (Japanese); Hayden Daviau (English)
A new eunuch from Feiyan Palace with which Jiu-jiu is acquainted with. He is later taken in by the Raven Consort after being dismissed by his former master.
Yun Huaniang (雲花娘, Un Kajō)
Voiced by: Reina Ueda
Known as the "Flower Princess," she is the consort from Yuanqian Palace—actually the Second Consort, in charge of looking after the inner palace. She becomes acquainted with Shouxue after she had helped her with a case concerning her lover, and considers her as her "younger sister."

== Media ==
=== Light novel ===
At Anime Expo 2022, Seven Seas Entertainment announced that they licensed the series for English publication.

No.	Original release date	Original ISBN	English release date	English ISBN
1	April 20, 2018	978-4-08-680188-1	January 5, 2023 (digital); February 14, 2023 (print)	978-1-68579-716-4
2	December 18, 2018	978-4-08-680225-3	April 13, 2023 (digital); June 6, 2023 (print)	978-1-68579-717-1
3	August 21, 2019	978-4-08-680267-3	August 3, 2023 (digital); September 26, 2023 (print)	978-1-68579-928-1
4	April 17, 2020	978-4-08-680314-4	September 28, 2023 (digital); December 19, 2023 (print)	978-1-68579-954-0
5	December 18, 2020	978-4-08-680353-3	January 11, 2024 (digital); April 2, 2024 (print)	979-8-88843-436-9
6	August 20, 2021	978-4-08-680400-4	June 27, 2024 (digital); July 2, 2024 (print)	979-8-88843-657-8
7	April 21, 2022	978-4-08-680441-7	September 19, 2024 (digital); October 22, 2024 (print)	979-8-89160-267-0

=== Anime ===
On December 14, 2021, an anime adaptation was announced. It was later confirmed to be a television series produced by BN Pictures and directed by Chizuru Miyawaki, with Satomi Ooshima overseeing the scripts, Shinji Takeuchi adapting Ayuko's character designs for animation, and Asami Tachibana composing the music. It aired from October 1 to December 24, 2022, on Tokyo MX, GYT, GTV, BS11 and Kansai TV. Crunchyroll streamed the series, and have premiered an English dub starting on October 22, 2022. In Southeast Asia, Plus Media Networks Asia licensed the series and aired on Aniplus Asia. The opening theme song is "Mysterious" by Queen Bee, while the ending theme song is "Natsu no Yuki" (夏の雪; "Summer Snow") by Krage.

No.	Title	Directed by	Written by	Storyboarded by	Original release date
1	"The Jade Earring, Part 1"; Transliteration: "Hisui no Mimikazari Zenpen" (Japanese: 翡翠の耳飾り 前篇)	Yasuhiro Minami	Satomi Ōshima	Chichi Miyawaki	October 1, 2022
Emperor Gaojun ascends to the throne by seizing power from the empress dowager who had his mother killed, resulting in him being disinherited. Shortly after claiming his rule, he approaches the Raven Consort Shouxue inquiring about the owner of a jade earring was apparently dropped by a spirit, but she summarily dismisses him. Upon further persuasion Shouxue agrees to help, using mystical powers to reveal the spirit of a court lady who died from strangulation. Gaojun requests she help free the spirit. Dressing as a palace attendant, Shouxue is aided by a young attendant, Jiujiu, on information regarding the case: a consort, Ban Yingnü, had hanged herself ten years ago after being accused of poisoning the Third Consort, who was allegedly unfaithful. Meanwhile, Gaojun seeks evidence to prosecute the empress dowager for his mother's death, only to inadvertently stumble upon Shouxue in the river — With the silver-white hair of a certain family from the previous dynasty.
2	"The Jade Earring, Part 2"; Transliteration: "Hisui no Mimikazari Kōhen" (Japanese: 翡翠の耳飾り 後篇)	Gorō Kuji	Satomi Ōshima	Gorō Kuji	October 8, 2022
Shouxue learns the owner of the earring was Ban Yingnü, whose spirit remains unable to rest in peace. With Jiujiu now appointed as her lady-in-waiting, the two head to the wash house where Ban Yingnü's former maid, Su Hongqiao, now resides. Despite having her tongue cut out, Hongqiao manages to explain, in writing, how Ban Yingnü had been falsely accused, and hence she subsequently hanged herself in despair. The real culprit is actually the Empress Dowager, who killed the Third Consort due to the latter's pregnancy, giving Gaojun the evidence he wanted. The earring is handed to Ban Yingnü's lover, a court official Guohao who possesses the other half, allowing the spirit to pass on peacefully. Gaojun reveals to Shouxue Ban Yingnü had once given him the earring to comfort him as a child. The following morning, Gaojun executes the empress dowager, who is charged with murders of the Third Consort, Gaojun's own mother, and one of his faithful friends, and attempted murder on him, the new emperor.
3	"The Whistle"; Transliteration: "Hanabue" (Japanese: 花笛)	Yasuhiro Minami	Satomi Ōshima	Yasuhiro Minami	October 15, 2022
Shouxue recalls how her mother was murdered trying to protect her, and she was sold into slavery before being found by the previous Raven Consort. Since then, she has dyed her hair black to prevent herself from persecution, although Gaojun promises her he will not kill her. In the morning, the highest-ranking concubine of the inner palace, Yun Huanniang, pays a visit to Shouxue, curious about Gaojun's frequent visits. Jiujiu informs Shouxue how Huanniang is known not merely for her position as consort and childhood friend of the emperor, but also for how she wears a flower flute perpetually around her sash, with such flower flutes being traditionally hung at the end of winter to mourn for the dead. It is then said the dead return with the spring wind and sound the flute. Huanniang requests Shouxue investigate why her flute does not sound — a flute she had specially made for her lover, Ou Xuanyou, following his death. To her surprise, Shouxue cannot summon Xuanyou's soul, as it has been trapped by a sorcerer with the same silver hair as her. The sorcerer taunts Shouxue, cryptically telling her the Raven Consort is capable of having everything she desires. With Xuanyou's spirit freed, Huanniang's flute finally sings.
4	"The Skylark Princess"; Transliteration: "Hibari Hime" (Japanese: 雲雀公主)	Daisuke Nakajima	Masaki Tachihara	Daisuke Nakajima	October 22, 2022
Jiujiu, feeling pity for the ghost of a skylark, asks Shouxue help it pass on. Shouxue investigates Princess Hibari, a former member of the inner palace and a sickly, isolated princess known for her pet skylark. Being inexperienced with social interaction, Shouxue mistakenly believes some small talk from the maids for a consort's palace to be considered a good place for work, their workers must receive fine clothes. Her attempt to gift Jiujiu clothes though, only angers the latter. Returning to the case, Shouxue learns of Princess Hibari's close relationship with a court lady Yang Shiniang, who returns to the river where the Princess had drowned to lay flowers frequently. Yang Shiniang explains she does so out of guilt, for the day the Princess drowned had been the day they had had an argument, and even as the Princess's skylark called for her to help she had chosen not to return. Shouxue deduces the Princess, due to her condition, was knowledgeable in medicines and had been trying to harvest fritillaria, a plant which could drive off Yang Shiniang's seasonal cough, only to fall into the river. Using the sculpture of a swallow made by Gaojun, Shouxue brings it to life to guide the skylark's ghost to paradise. Later, Jiujiu apologizes for overstepping her boundaries as a lady-in-waiting, and Shouxue apologizes for not understanding her feelings of wanting to serve out of pure loyalty. Jiujiu, Shouxue and Hongqiao then share some sweets together.
5	"Confidant"; Transliteration: "Futokorogatana" (Japanese: 懐刀)	Ryō Yasumura	Masaki Tachihara	Akira Nishimori	October 29, 2022
Gaojun awakens from a nightmare about Ding Lan and his mother appearing in front of him in his bedroom. When Wei Qing suggested he should ask Shouxue about it, he tells him not to. Gaojun comes to Ye Ming Palace, anyway, and asks Shouxue about a ghost with silver hair haunting the inner palace, under the willow tree south of Huaniang's palace. Shouxue thinks it is Luan Bingyue, the grandson of the previous emperor known for his skills in sorcery. It is around this time that Qing snapped at Shouxue for how she speaks with Gaojun, even going as far as warning her that he also knows of her secret. The next day, Dan Hai reports to Gaojun about Luan Bingyue's adopted father Feng Yixing, a sorcerer. Qing volunteers to help look into the matter. Meanwhile, Shouxue finds out that the unsettled spirit under the willow tree is not that of Bingyue, but that of a woman with an agate ornament. Gaojun granted her permission to check the storehouse for something similar, and in secret, as only eunuchs and the Emperor are allowed inside it. Qing found himself in the red-light district looking for Yixing, where he faced his past. He runs away from the place and eventually going back to Emperor Gaojun's palace, where he sees him facing the ghosts of Ding Lan and his mother. After Gaojun asks him to make some tea, he reports that he was unable to find the sorcerer. Gaojun says he's done enough. The next day Qing comes to apologize to Shouxue, though she apologizes herself. It is here that Qing asks for help about the apparitions haunting Emperor Gaojun in his bedroom. And on her way to the storehouse in Ningguang Palace, she smells something familiar.: This episode also reveals Qing's sorrowful and tormented past. After his mother committed suicide, he decided to become an eunuch, but was tricked into becoming a male prostitute. escaping the brothel where he was, he met a young Gaojun, who sheltered him and appointed him as his assistant, as well as giving him his current name and surname.
6	"The Summer King and the Winter King"; Transliteration: "Natsu no Ō, Fuyu no Ō" (Japanese: 夏の王、冬の王)	Hisaya Takabayashi	Satomi Ōshima	Hisaya Takabayashi	November 5, 2022
Yuyi, the storehouse keeper, shows her a red jade pendant, that of Princess Mingzhu, the beautiful second princess of the former dynasty, which is the same pendant she saw on the ghost under the willow tree. According to Yuyi, she refused to be taken alive by imperial guards wanting to kill her by committing suicide under a willow tree. Yuyi also shows the dagger Mingzhu used to kill herself, and a portrait of Mingzhu beside that of Luan Bingyue. Shouxue notices a glass comb on the portrait which, according to Yuyi, was never found. Gaojun is informed of this. He also thinks Qing told her of the apparitions in his bedroom, but Shouxue lied her way through by saying its because of a strange odor coming from his bedroom. After asking Xue Yuyong about a document containing information related to the Raven Consort, written by a certain Baiyan, which is falsified by the first Luan Emperor, Gaojun demands the truth, and finds out that there's another "shuangtongdian" (historical records) passed down from one emperor to another which contains the one true origins of the Raven Consort. A part of the true record is being kept by the Raven Consort herself committed to memory, and he asks that she shows him. Though offended when she finds out that Gaojun does this out of pity for her, she shows him the record, anyway: it involves the goddess Niao Lian, and her choosing of two of the people where she rested to become the king of summer and the king of winter; as well as Luan Xi, a general who is the ancestor of the Luan Dynasty, and Xiang Qiang, the new Winter King and the very first Raven Consort, who has protected Niao Lian at Ye Ming Palace, built for her by Luan Xi. Xi had refused to recognize Qiang as the Winter King for fear that another war would break out, which plagued the first Summer and Winter Kings. Practically the reason why the Raven Consort existed, and the reason she cannot leave the palace, as Shouxue says that Niao Lian "sank her talons into her" on the night her mother was murdered, as it was a moonlit night, the time said to be when the goddess slips out of Ye Ming and becomes the Yeyoushen, the kidnapper of children; and ties her to the palace so that she can't leave the palace, else she dies. Just then, Bingyue possesses Jiu-Jiu and threatens to physically harm her with a shard of a cup she threw to the floor in rage.
7	"Glass Prayer"; Transliteration: "Hari ni Inoru" (Japanese: 玻璃に祈る)	Gorō Kuji	Satomi Ōshima	Gorō Kuji	November 12, 2022
After disarming the shard out of the possessed Jiu-jiu's hands, Shouxue tears Bingyue out of her and almost exterminated him with her powers when Gaojun stopped her, and eventually listened to what he says. Bingyue asks for Shouxue's help with the ghost of his aunt Mingzhu, his lover (because they are of different fathers). When he was beheaded by Yandi during the Luan purge, he was doomed to wander as a ghost. He sees the ghost of Mingzhu, but as if she can't hear him and can't talk to her, preventing her from sending her to Paradise. Failing to find his master Feng and Yandi, he possessed many sorcerers in an attempt to communicate with Mingzhu until he hears there is a new Raven Consort and a Luan at that. On the way to the willow tree, Shouxue asks Bingyue about a glass comb, which he says is a symbol of his engagement to her, and that it's lost. Shouxue finds the comb buried under the willow tree, probably buried by Mingzhu herself. Through Shouxue's powers, she returned the comb on Mingzhu's hair, and that enables Bingyue to talk to her, and goes into Paradise together. The next night, Shouxue escapes out of Ye Ming Palace and head out to Ningguang to exorcise the monster hiding in Gaojun's bedchamber—the reason why the ghosts of Ding Lan and his mother are there. It is said that the scent is that of a curse cast using a beast, which was left by the corrupt Empress Dowager moments before getting beheaded. Later, as Shouxue is getting dressed for tea with Huaniang, she remembers Li Niang, her predecessor who taught her to leave in strict seclusion. On the way back from Huaniang's place, she finds Gaojun at the door with news about him repealing the death warrant imposed on the Luans for merely being born with silver-white hair. Gaojun also made Shouxue swear on an oath, as between the Summer King and the Winter King, symbolized by two fish amulets: an oath for Gaojun not to kill her, for them not to fight each other, for him to treat her as the Winter King (as well as respect for all the other Ravens Consort before her)...and for his wish to be her friend.
8	"Blue Swallow"; Transliteration: "Ao Tsubame" (Japanese: 青燕)	Yasuhiro Minami	Masaki Tachihara	Akira Nishimori	November 19, 2022
After a mysterious veiled woman with a scent worn by a mourning person came to Shouxue asking in vain if she could resurrect someone, a Hadan eunuch named Yi Siha came to ask for help about a ghost that appears at Feiyan palace, that of a young eunuch. Siha came to Shouxue as a last resort since no one would believe him, and also caused him to be caned. She paid a visit to the palace, dropping by the scaredycat Swallow Consort Chang Huangying for permission, careful not to scare her. The ghost, standing on a bridge, seems to be apologizing with a blue feather in hand. Sensing the sadness in the ghost, she wondered if Siha's master knows of something. She caught Kang Lang, Siha's master, caning Siha, for simply saying he saw a ghost. She then asks him about a Hadan eunuch who died at Feiyan Palace and whose ghost is roaming around the place. Denying it at first for fear of upsetting the Swallow Consort, he said something out of fear when he saw something in Shouxue's eyes. It is about a eunuch who fell in love with a consort. She then scolded him for using harsh punishments. She asked Gaojun about it that night, as well as the dead eunuch's master; and talked to him about the harsh punishments doled out to erring new eunuchs. It is later revealed that the ghost is that of Yuisha, an executed eunuch. His friend Shiyan reveals the details: Yuisha offered a blue swallow's feather to the consort of Feiyan Palace, which was periodically followed by more but the consort got bored of it. Obsessed, Yuisha began to pluck every bird he caught in his traps. A blue swallow accidentally died in one of his traps, which is punishable by death if it happened within the palace walls. Yuisha showed the bird to the Swallow Consort in order to apologize, which scared her. He was executed shortly, while Shiyan hid in fear because he helped him set the trap up. Using the blue swallow feather that Shiyan still has in his possession, Shouxue helps Yuisha in entering paradise, with Yuisha forgiving Shiyan. Somehow that gave Shouxue an insight as to what friendship is all about. Meanwhile, Yi Siha, being kicked out by his master, is vouched in by Wen Ying for her to take him in as a servant, for he sees a rarity in her, who has compassion for eunuchs, like him, punished for defending a lute player who was assaulted in an acrobatic troupe he was once a part of. At night, Shouxue has a nightmare involving the almighty avian goddess Niao Lian herself who had chosen her, implying greater mysteries and dangers personally regarding Shouxue.
9	"Water's Voice"; Transliteration: "Mizu no Koe" (Japanese: 水の聲)	Daisuke Nakajima	Masaki Tachihara	Daisuke Nakajima	November 26, 2022
During dark, moonless nights, it is usual for Shouxue to sleep in tearing pain as she is unable to keep Niao Lian within her body. On that same night, after seeing Niao Lian flying in the sky, Feng Xiao Xue, a student of Master Feng Xiying, wanted to go to the inner palace. He promised to introduce him to a connection, not knowing that Xiao Xue has plans to kill the Raven Consort. Meanwhile, as she recovers from that night by teaching Yi Siha, her new stead, how to write, Gaojun gets suspicious about the reason why she forbade him from visiting that night, and asks Xue Yuyong about her. The next night, a court lady named An Huilan comes to ask Shouxue help about hearing voices from within the water, that of Xi Wanlin, dubbed the Magpie Princess, and the consort she once served who, on the day before the emperor is to visit her, she finds her slippers by the lake and assumed that she drowned in it, and that she started hearing the voices after being sent to the wash house as a laundry woman. After a little background investigation of her own, Shouxue visits Quechao Palace, and finds Huilan at the edge of the lake. She says that Huilan did not really like Wanlin because of what really happened: Huilan's lover, a young visiting bookseller, broke into her room, was arrested, and beheaded on the spot. Wanlin then kept a bag containing dirt with the beheaded man's blood in it, which Huilan, out of her strictness, threw away, driving Wanlin to drown herself, and so Huilan greatly fears her grudge. Also, at that time, Shouxue was talking to the spirit of Huilan, as she had died the night before of a lung disease, saying that Huilan fears herself for driving Wanlin to her death. Shocked upon glimpsing her ghoulish reflection, Huilan slips into the waters, as Shouxue throws in a wreath with a spell to keep her essence confined there, as Wanlin is already in paradise. She admits Li Niang could have handled it better. That night as she receives a gift from Gaojun after agreeing to an invitation from him to meet with the Ministry of Works, she felt pain. Rushing back to the edge of the lake, she finds the wreath torn to pieces by someone, whom she comes to recognize to be the very same "owl" she saw that moonless night. Meanwhile, Feng Xiao Xue visits someone; presumably the woman who desperately requested that Shouxue return her lover to life earlier.
10	"The Masked Man"; Transliteration: "Kamen no Otoko" (Japanese: 仮面の男)	Yoshifumi Sasahara	Masaki Tachihara	Yoshifumi Sasahara	December 3, 2022
News of a cursed cloth mask which enables a person to see a ghost that turns around with the sound of a five-stringed lute comes to the attention of Gaojun through a scholar named He Mingyun, just as he hears of news from Chancellor Yun Yongde that a eunuch from Feiyan Palace (which could probably be Yi Siha's former master, after seeing that "monster" in her eyes) claims to be cursed by the Raven Consort. Gaojun leaves as Yongde warns him about associating with the Raven Consort. Meanwhile, Yue Yuyong comes to tell Shouxue of not doing as she is told, though she defends herself, saying it's not as if she likes it. That night, Gaojun comes to show the cursed cloth mask, which he purchased, to Shouxue. She did a little investigation, which involved asking Wen Ying to summon the Red Sparrow troupe, but they already left the capital. Gaojun, however, says that there's a five-stringed lute in the imperial archives, handled by a musician named Zuoqiu Yao. He identified the ghost as that of Qifu Shicui, a musician obsessed with the five-stringed lute who got less and less performance requests due to his selfish behavior. He then spent his days playing in the Baoer Workshop until he grew emaciated and his fingers bleeding from playing it. Yao had stopped him by taking his lute away and locking him in, only to find him dead hanging from the ceiling the next day. The sound of his lute was heard even after his funeral, which stopped when he burned the lute. Shouxue is able to send him to paradise by using her skills while asking Yao to play the lute no matter what. When Shicui crossed over, Shouxue burned the mask and the lute, the latter being a national treasure. As he, Dan Hai and Wei Qing escorts Shouxue home after that, she expresses her worries over Gaojun to Wen Ying about his reason for marrying Huaniang. On their way back to Ningguang Palace after escorting Shouxue home, Qing was about to scold Ying and remind him of the reason why he was sent to Ye Ming Palace, when Dan Hai alerts them to trouble. The three eunuchs are shocked to find the body of a recently murdered woman at the foot of a fallen tree somewhere in the forest.
11	"Groundwork"; Transliteration: "Fuseki" (Japanese: 布石)	Shigeru Ueda	Satomi Ōshima	Akira Nishimori	December 10, 2022
A court lady runs for her life, away from an unknown creature that killed her later. The next day, news of the dead woman on the foot of a fallen tree, that of the court lady from Quechao Palace, reaches Shouxue, and, after asking Dan Hai, deduced it was a human who did it. Meanwhile over a board game, Gaojun talks to Xue Yuyong on how to break the Raven Consort's constraints when Shouxue, in eunuch garb, arrives, and knows of Yuyong's plans to retire from his position. When she asks Gaojun about the slain court lady, Wei Qing mentions the name Xue Cheng, which leads to the Magpie Consort, who has been mourning the loss of her brother, and Gaojun is considering sending her back to her parents, but hesitates because of the politics behind it. After words of warning from Yuyong not to be too friendly with the Emperor, Shouxue asks Wen Ying to look into the Magpie Consort. After helping Xue Cheng's ghost to cross into paradise, Wen Ying comes to report, and finds out that the Magpie Consort is bedridden and allows no one but a chosen eunuch and certain person to enter. Shouxue is shocked to find out that the person is that "owl" she saw on the night Niao Lian roamed freely, and knows of his name. Qing also reports of strange slurping, groaning noises coming out of the Magpie Consort's bedchamber. Asking to be alone, she knows the "owl" is out there, ready to kill her, and is causing her to feel down, even with Huanniang coming to visit, offering her support. She reveals this to Emperor Gaojun when she meets him on the way to go looking for Wen Ying, who didn't return by nightfall (actually, he was caught sneaking into Quechao by Feng Xiao Xue, who attacked him). She reveals she sent Ying out because of her fear of being killed, as she felt she has become weak. But Gaojun reassures her that it is alright to feel weak and to rely on others. Gaojun accompanies Shouxue to Quechao, where they find the Magpie Consort in her bedchamber, the thick smell of xiangfu incense in the air, and that of another smell—that of Feng Xiao Xue himself—standing at the foot of the bedridden consort. Upon seeing that the Raven Consort has finally arrived, he smiles evilly.
12	"Siblings"; Transliteration: "Kyōdai" (Japanese: 兄妹)	Yasuhiro Minami	Satomi Ōshima	Akira Nishimori; Gorō Kuji	December 17, 2022
Shouxue came to return the shawl to Qin Huiyao, the Magpie Consort, as Feng Xiao Xue simply vanished into a room. According to her, after failing to ask that favor from Shouxue, Xiao Xue appeared before her and allegedly was able to fulfil her wish of bringing her dead elder brother to life by the use of some sorcery involving a bit of her brother's hair and some dirt. Searching for the clay doll which Huiyao thinks is her brother, they enter a room and come across buckets of what looks like human blood; and find Wen Ying inside, unconscious but alive. Huiyao tries in vain to stop them simply because she's weak and Shouxue can smell him, or rather his clay doll zombie. The zombie appears, nearly attacking Shouxue, but Ying and an entering Dan Hai try to subdue it. It's actually going berserk because, according to Huiyao, it will return to a clump of dirt if not given human blood, which Huiyao readily gives it by slashing her arm and allowing it to suck her blood, and the reason why she is weak and emaciated. Huiyao later admits that it was her "brother" who attacked and killed the court lady who was found dead in the forest after she came across them by accident on the night when it went full berserk. Shouxue says Xiao Yue didn't bring him to life, but merely created a soulless moving clay doll. Further denial costs her her life when the zombie bites her in the neck. Shouxue uses her powers to stab the zombie with a magical arrow and pulls the clump of hair from the clay doll, which promptly crumbles afterwards. Dan Hai later reports to Shouxue that Xiao Xue is nowhere to be found. Gaojun promises Shouxue to find him. On the way back to Ningguang, Gaojun suddenly turns around and returns. The reason: at that time, Shouxue goes to confront Xiao Xue, or rather, his vessel. The vessel was actually sent by the real Xiao Xue from The Palace of Seclusion, from the land across the sea where the gods are said to reside, as an executioner of the "thing" inside of Shouxue (referring to Niao Lian), and is here to execute his "sister", namely what is inside of her. He also introduces Simalu, said to be the Raven's original niaobu (familiar). He is actually watching her for a long time because any direct interference on that island, a place where those banished from the Palace of Seclusion are exiled, by him is forbidden. He also says that the Owl and the Raven were originally one but split in two from a bubble, one became the Executioner and the other became the Guide for the Spirits of the Dead. Apparently the guide was tempted by the dead to call a soul back to the mortal world and revive it, which is a grave sin. He waited for a thousand years to find the perfect time to slay the Raven and finds it, but this means killing the vessel (Shouxue). Emperor Gaojun comes in for the save, along with Wei Qing and the others. Overwhelmed but not beaten yet, Xiao Xue blames Xiang Qiang, the original Raven Consort, for her suffering—the result of her sealing Niao Lian inside her and every succeeding Raven Consort, up to Shouxue herself, which he thinks is a criminal act, hence his hatred for the first Raven Consort. He also explains the painful moonless nights—it's allegedly her soul being nearly torn by the Raven trying to escape, and Shouxue is halfway towards becoming the Raven without her realizing it. Also, the flowers she was offering Niao Lian is actually a poison, causing her to be gradually intoxicated, causing the pain she suffers during the new moon (the Raven herself actually screaming in pain and rage). As Xiao Xue tries to execute Shouxue again, Gaojun saves her again, as Xing-Xing, Shouxue's niaobu, enters the scene. Taking some of his feathers and turning them into arrows, she destroys Xiao Xue's clay vessel. It mutters something as it turns into brown owl feathers.
13	"Xiangfu Incense"; Transliteration: "Sōfukō" (Japanese: 想夫香)	Ryō Yasumura	Satomi Ōshima	Chizuru Miyawaki	December 24, 2022
Shouxue fainted after the encounter with Xiao Xue, where Gaojun had a light scratch after saving her. While unconscious, Xiao Xue appeared, telling that she's already halfway to becoming the Raven, and about the "poisonous" flowers Xiang Qiang had been feeding them. She awakens when Yi Siha appears calling her a "monster," and Xue Yuyong repeating his warning to her. Before leaving, Gaojun gives Shouxue a wooden replica of the fish amulet to stand by as a substitute. As Xing-Xing returns, Shouxue remembers the name Xiao Xue mentioned, implying that Xing-Xing was once called "Halala." As they mourned the death of the Magpie Consort at Quechao, Gaojun asks Huaniang to look after the other consorts, so that it will never happen again. Later, at Ningguang, Wei Qing returns to report to Gaojun about Xiao Xue's collaborator. Gaojun is shocked to find out his identity, as eunuchs looked for him at Xianghao. At the same night Xue Yuyong goes to Ye Ming to chat with Shouxue. After reminiscing his days with Li Nang, Shouxue asks when will Yuyong draw the blade he's been hiding—Yuyong came to Ye Ming to kill her. She is bracing for the stab when Emperor Gaojun grabs him from behind, revealing that he is the collaborator who snuck Xiao Xue's animated clay doll into the inner palace. But Yuyong says it is not for him to decide, but rather it is fate that dictated him to kill her, even if Gaojun says she saw him as a friend. He eventually reveals part of the reason why he wanted to kill her, and that is because of his jealousy towards Shouxue, who is blessed with companions, unlike his best friend Li Niang, the previous Raven Consort. Emperor Gaojun corrected his claim of Li Niang spending her days alone, because, with Shouxue around, she really was not. Gaojun allowed him to leave as a retired person. Tending to his undone bandages, Shouxue says to Gaojun that Yuyong entered the Ministry of Works in the hope of researching a way of setting the Raven Consort free from such a cruel fate. She is later asked by Gaojun if she would accept getting killed by Yuyong, replying that her old self would. It was Gaojun's image and words that became her salvation. As she massaged his palms because Gaojun is sleeping at Ye Ming that night, Shouxue asked him to burn a silk feather to mourn the loss of the Magpie Princess. Shouxue burned a silk feather for the Magpie Princess and writes a letter to her parents before meeting Huaniang for tea. As Gaojun is readying himself to meet Qin Xiaojing, the Magpie Princess' father, at the lotus pond gazebo, Wei Qing finds bruising around Emperor Gaojun's closed wound, but thought little of it. He expressed his feeling of deep sympathy for his daughter in Shouxue's words, saying she and him are kind people; as Emperor Gaojun joins him in mourning for her. Meanwhile, in her thoughts, soaring into the sky with her hair its natural silver and voices calling her "Raven", and with Gaojun—the wings of a brown owl appearing on where the bruising in his arm is, Shouxue awaits the day when she will be herself again.

== Reception ==
Raven of the Inner Palace was awarded the Grand Prize of the 22nd Sense of Gender Awards in 2022. The series had over 1.2 million copies in circulation by 2023.

== See also ==
- The Earl and the Fairy, a light novel series whose manga adaptation was illustrated by Ayuko
