= My Status as an Assassin Obviously Exceeds the Hero's =

Japanese light novel series and its adaptations

- First light novel volume cover

暗殺者である俺のステータスが勇者よりも明らかに強いのだが (Ansatsusha de Aru ore no Sutētasu ga Yūsha Yori mo Akiraka ni Tsuyoi Nodaga)
- Genre: Fantasy, isekai
- Novel series
- Written by: Matsuri Akai
- Published by: Shōsetsuka ni Narō
- Original run: January 26, 2017 – present
- Light novel
- Written by: Matsuri Akai
- Illustrated by: Tōzai
- Published by: Overlap
- English publisher: NA: Seven Seas Entertainment
- Imprint: Overlap Bunko
- Original run: November 25, 2017 – present
- Volumes: 6
- Manga
- Written by: Matsuri Akai
- Illustrated by: Hiroyuki Aigamo
- Published by: Overlap
- English publisher: NA: Seven Seas Entertainment
- Imprint: Gardo Comics
- Magazine: Comic Gardo
- Original run: July 10, 2018 – present
- Volumes: 7
- Anime television series
- Directed by: Nobuyoshi Habara
- Written by: Kunihiko Okada
- Music by: Satoshi Igarashi
- Studio: Sunrise (animation) (Note: Planning cooperation (企画協力) by Sunrise Beyond); TMS Entertainment (production and planning) (Note: Under the "Unlimited Produce by TMS" label)
- Licensed by: Crunchyroll; SEA: Muse Communication
- Original network: TV Tokyo, BS Fuji, Animax
- Original run: October 7, 2025 – December 22, 2025
- Episodes: 12
- icon

My Status as an Assassin Obviously Exceeds the Hero's (暗殺者である俺のステータスが勇者よりも明らかに強いのだが, Ansatsusha de Aru no Sutētasu ga Yūsha Yori mo Akiraka ni Tsuyoi Nodaga) is a Japanese light novel series written by Matsuri Akai and illustrated by Tōzai. It began serialization on the user-generated novel publishing website Shōsetsuka ni Narō in January 2017. It was later acquired by Overlap who began publishing the series under its Overlap Bunko imprint in November 2017. A manga adaptation illustrated by Hiroyuki Aigamo began serialization on Overlap's Comic Gardo website in July 2018. An anime television series adaptation produced by TMS Entertainment and animated by Sunrise aired from October to December 2025.

== Plot ==
After a class of Japanese high school students is magically summoned to the Retice Kingdom within a world similar to that of a role-playing video game, they are told that they are meant to save the humans' continent from demons. However, a student named Akira Oda who was given the assassin character class quickly realizes that his stats are much higher than those of the supposed hero, and that the king of Retice is hiding information from the students.

== Characters ==
Akira Oda (織田 晶, Oda Akira)
Voiced by: Takeo Ōtsuka (Japanese); Austin Tindle (English)
Amelia Rosequartz (アメリア・ローズクォーツ, Ameria Rōzukwōtsu)
Voiced by: Saku Mizuno (Japanese); Sarah Wiedenheft (English)
Yoru (夜)
Voiced by: Sanae Kobayashi (Japanese); Anastasia Munoz (English)
Lia Lagoon (リア・ラグーン, Ria Ragūn)
Voiced by: Konomi Tamura (Japanese); Dani Chambers (English)
Saran Mithray (サラン・ミスレイ, Saran Misurei)
Voiced by: Junichi Suwabe (Japanese); James Cheek (English)
Tsukasa Satō (佐藤司, Satō Tsukasa)
Voiced by: Ayato Morinaga (Japanese); Mark Allen Jr. (English)
Kyosuke Asahina (朝比奈京介, Asahina Kyosuke)
Voiced by: Masaaki Mizunaka (Japanese); Garret Storms (English)

== Media ==
=== Light novel ===
Written by Matsuri Akai, My Status as an Assassin Obviously Exceeds the Hero's began serialization on the user-generated novel publishing website Shōsetsuka ni Narō on January 26, 2017. It was later acquired by Overlap who began publishing the series with illustrations by Tōzai under its Overlap Bunko light novel imprint on November 25, 2017. Six volumes have been released as of September 20, 2026. The series is licensed in English by Seven Seas Entertainment.

No.	Original release date	Original ISBN	North American release date	North American ISBN
1	November 25, 2017	978-4-86554-280-6	July 8, 2021 (digital); September 7, 2021 (print)	978-1-64827-658-3
1. Prologue; 2. Chapter 1: "Summoned to Another World?!"; 3. Chapter 2: "The Trap"; 4. Intermission: "Commander Sara"; 5. Chapter 3: "The Labyrinth"; 6. Chapter 4: "A New Companion"; 7. Chapter 5: "The Elven Domain"
2	March 25, 2018	978-4-86554-327-8	October 14, 2021 (digital); November 9, 2021 (print)	978-1-64827-659-0
1. Chapter 1: "A New Adventure Begins"; 2. Chapter 2: "The Land of Beasts"; 3. Chapter 3: "Crisis"; 4. Chapter 4: "The Great Labyrinth of Brute"; 5. Chapter 5: "Demons"
3	January 25, 2019	978-4-86554-376-6	December 2, 2021 (digital); January 11, 2022 (print)	978-1-64827-660-6
1. Chapter 1: "The Ring"; 2. Chapter 2: "The Beauty Pageant"; 3. Chapter 3: "Uruk, the City of Water"; 4. Chapter 4: "New Revelations"; 5. Chapter 5: "A Chance Encounter"; 6. Epilogue: "The Kill"
4	February 25, 2021	978-4-86554-845-7	March 24, 2022 (digital); April 12, 2022 (print)	978-1-63858-195-6
1. Prologue: "A Glimpse of the Future"; 2. Chapter 1: "In Vengeance's Wake"; 3. Chapter 2: "Changes"; 4. Chapter 3: "Home Base"; 5. Chapter 4: "Unprepared"; 6. Chapter 5: "The Final Ingredient"
5	September 25, 2025	978-4-8240-1336-1	May 21, 2026 (digital); July 7, 2026 (print)	978-1-63858-633-3
1. Prologue: "The Uruki Assassin"; 2. Chapter 1: "Departure"; 3. Chapter 2: "The Wyvern Attack"; 4. Chapter 3: "Taboo"; 5. Chapter 4: "The Demon Realm"; 6. Chapter 5: "Landfall"
6	September 20, 2026	978-4-8240-1843-4	June 8, 2027 (print)	979-8-89863-992-1

=== Manga ===
A manga adaptation illustrated by Hiroyuki Aigamo began serialization on Overlap's Comic Gardo website on July 10, 2018. The manga's chapters have been collected into seven tankōbon volumes as of July 8, 2026. The manga adaptation is also licensed in English by Seven Seas Entertainment.

No.	Original release date	Original ISBN	North American release date	North American ISBN
1	January 25, 2019	978-4-86554-443-5	March 10, 2020	978-1-64505-289-0
1. "Summoned to Another World?!"; 2. "The Trap I"; 3. "The Trap II"; 4. "The Trap III"; 5. "The Trap IV"; Bonus: "The Worst Circumstances"
2	August 25, 2019	978-4-86554-537-1	July 21, 2020	978-1-64505-492-4
6. "Labyrinth I"; 7. "Labyrinth II"; 8. "Labyrinth III"; 9. "A New Companion I"; 10. "A New Companion II"; Bonus: "Until My Long-Awaited Guest Arrives"
3	March 25, 2020	978-4-86554-669-9	December 22, 2020	978-1-64505-809-0
11. "A New Companion III"; 12. "A New Companion IV"; 13. "The Elf Domain I"; 14. "The Elf Domain II"; 15. "The Elf Domain III"; 16. "The Elf Domain IV"; 17. "The Elf Domain V"; Bonus: "Call My Name"
4	March 25, 2022	978-4-8240-0033-0	April 25, 2023	978-1-64827-914-0
18. "The Elf Domain VI"; 19. "The Elf Domain VII"; 20. "A New Journey I"; 21. "A New Journey II"; 22. "A New Journey III"; Bonus: "On the Sea, Taking Stock"
5	September 25, 2023	978-4-8240-0615-8	May 7, 2024	978-1-64827-352-0
23. "Brute, the Beastfolk Domain I"; 24. "Brute, the Beastfolk Domain II"; 25. "Brute, the Beastfolk Domain III"; 26. "Brute, the Beastfolk Domain IV"; 27. "Brute, the Beastfolk Domain V"; 28. "Brute, the Beastfolk Domain VI"; Bonus: "I Like That You Eat So Much"
6	February 25, 2025	978-4-8240-1096-4	November 25, 2025	979-8-89373-308-2
29. "Brute, the Beastfolk Domain VII"; 30. "Brute, the Beastfolk Domain VIII"; 31. "The Brute Labyrinth I"; 32. "The Brute Labyrinth II"; 33. "The Brute Labyrinth III"; Bonus: "Walking Side by Side"
7	July 8, 2026	978-4-8240-1709-3	June 1, 2027	979-8-89765-351-5

=== Anime ===
An anime television series adaptation was announced on February 18, 2025. It is produced by TMS Entertainment, animated by Sunrise and directed by Nobuyoshi Habara, with Kunihiko Okada handling series composition and scripts, Hirona Okada and Kaori Saito designing the characters, Masahiro Yamane designing the monsters, and Satoshi Igarashi composing the music. The series aired from October 7 to December 23, 2025, on TV Tokyo and other networks. (Note: TV Tokyo listed the series premiere on October 6 at 25:30, which is effectively October 7 at 1:30 a.m. JST.) The opening theme song is "Issen" (一閃; 'Flash of Light'), performed by Vesperbell, while the ending theme song is "Like Gravity", performed by Bonnie Pink. Crunchyroll is streaming the series. Muse Communication licensed the series in Southeast Asia.

==== Episodes ====
No.	Title	Directed by	Storyboarded by	Original release date
1	"The Assassin Eats Bread"; Transliteration: "Ansatsusha wa Pan o Kū" (Japanese: 暗殺者はパンを食う)	Nobuyoshi Habara & Akira Yamada	Nobuyoshi Habara & Mitsuru Ishihara	October 7, 2025
An entire class of high school students are summoned to Retice Kingdom in the world of Morrigan. As the human continent is under attack by demons they have been summoned by the King in hopes one of them is the Hero. Class loner Akira Oda discovers he holds the title Assassin and his stats far exceed his classmates, even President Tsukasa, the Hero. Akira uses a concealment skill to avoid being assessed and learns the King is untrustworthy. Knight Commander Saran and his subordinate Gilles begin training them for a dungeon raid. Saran sees through his concealment and offers to train Akira secretly as an assassin. Saran and Giles are surprised Akira was summoned with an already max level Concealment as the only other person with the same skill was the first Hero. Akira discovers Saran is plotting to overthrow the corrupt King. As the class prepares to raid the dungeon Akira spots a woman watching them and tells him to find her again after he learns what the King had sacrificed to summon them. In the dungeon, a tool given to Tsukasa to deter monsters seemingly summons a Minotaur that breaks his arms. Akira is forced to take over, making Tsukasa jealous. It is discovered a curse is affecting Tsukasa's mind.
2	"The Assassin Takes Care of the Wounded"; Transliteration: "Ansatsusha wa Kanbyō Suru" (Japanese: 暗殺者は看病する)	Tomo Ōkubo	Susumu Nishizawa	October 14, 2025
Akira uses Shadow Magic to sever the minotaur's head, but it exhausts him. Saran gives him the black katana "Yato-no-Kami", which was forged by the first hero. Akira infiltrates the Princess's bedroom and destroys the crystal she used to curse Tsukasa, but it is shown the Princess has further crystals for his classmates. Saran has been found dead next morning and his cursed classmates accuses Akira. The King demands his execution but Akira escapes and managed to make contact with Gilles who was certain that Saran was murdered by the King's Night Raven Assassins. Akira flees soon after so the King sends the Night Ravens after him while preparing to use the cursed students to declare war on the Eastern kingdoms. Akira hides in the Kantinen dungeon and begins hunting monsters to increase his assassination level. Meanwhile, Gilles uses a secret mind manipulation skill to free six others from the Princess's curse and together with Tsukasa they leave the castle, claiming they are journeying to defeat the demon lord for the King. One of them, Kyosuke, feels guilty for not helping Akira. He is also unsure why he suddenly possesses a white katana. On floor 75, Akira rescues an elf princess named Amelia Rosequartz from a dark slime and helps her recover. Teaming up, they reach floor 80 and take down a dragon.
3	"The Assassin Plays With A Cat"; Transliteration: "Ansatsusha wa Neko to Fureau" (Japanese: 暗殺者は猫と触れ合う)	Akie Ishii	Akie Ishii	October 21, 2025
The dragon transforms into a Black Cat. Having been defeated it passes them a message from the Demon Lord to visit Volcano, land of the demons, and fight the Demon King. Akira decides to make Black Cat his familiar and names him Night for his dark fur. Elsewhere, Tsukasa leads his party to the Yamato Kingdom resembling feudal Japan, having been founded by the first hero. Tsukasa decides they need to defeat the Demon Lord, after which they can ask the King to send them home. Kyosuke points out if they want victory they need Akira. Tsukasa doubts Akira would join them unless they were already strong enough, so the decision is made to stay in Yamato and train while earning a living as adventurers. Amelia tells Akira about her being driven out from the village by her younger sister Kilika, and while escaping she was swallowed by the dark slime and didn't regain consciousness until Akira rescued her. Akira advises her to reconciling with Kilika if they ever meet again, since he misses his own sister Yui. They leave the dungeon via teleportation circle but Amelia's strong feelings warp their destination and they appear in the forest continent of the elves. They are immediately surrounded by archers led by Kilika, who refers to Amelia as Child of Blight.
4	"The Assassin Calls Her Name"; Transliteration: "Ansatsusha wa Namae o Yobu" (Japanese: 暗殺者は名前を呼ぶ)	Kōji Sasaki	Akinori Kageyama & Mizuki Aoba	October 28, 2025 (Note: This episode aired at 2:00 a.m. JST, 30 minutes after the regular air time on TV Tokyo.)
Akira knocks out several elves, including Amelia's former fiancé Liam. Kilika uses Mesmerize to hypnotize Akira. However, Akira is unaffected and accuses Kilika of using Mesmerize to turn the elves against Amelia. The King arrives and welcomes Amelia home but she insists on leaving with Akira, so the King challenges Akira to duel Kilika. Akira wins the duel and Kilika claims Amelia ruined her life as when they were children, Amelia was revealed as a Spirit Medium. Afterwards, Kilika was overlooked constantly until she grew to hate Amelia. Amelia removes Mesmerize from all the elves. The King takes the blame and reveals he had sealed away some of Kilika's memories. He returns them and Kilika remembers as a child an evil mage tricked her into summoning monsters that murdered Liam. As a Spirit Medium, Amelia resurrected him but Kilika's guilt was so great the King erased her memories. As the only one who didn't know the truth, a distance regrettably developed between Kilika and the other elves, which she blamed on Amelia. Liam admits that in his love for Kilika, he helped exile Amelia, hoping Kilika's heart would recover if Amelia was gone. Kilika reconciles with Amelia and is able to reconnect with her people. The King decides Amelia can continue travelling with Akira. Akira decides to visit the Beast-folk continent. By coincidence, Tsukasa and his party also decide to visit the beast-folk continent.
5	"The Assassin Sleeps in a Bed"; Transliteration: "Ansatsusha wa Beddo de Nemuru" (Japanese: 暗殺者はベッドで眠る)	Mizuki Aoba	Shigeru Ikeda	November 4, 2025
Night admits the Demon Lord knows Akira used Shadow Magic. Bandits employed by Lord Gram attack them but are captured by Akira. The guards explain Gram is a beastfolk royal behind numerous kidnappings. They board a ship to the port city Ur where Akira finds humans are treated as second class citizens by the beastfolk. They also have a cultural phobia of black cats. Amelia plans to seduce Akira, but he pretends to be asleep. The next morning Night invites Crow, a blacksmith and former member of the Hero party, to meet Akira. He offers to repair Yato-no-Kami if Akira finds the materials. He also makes it clear Akira lacks experience with swords. Akira decides to raid Ur's dungeon for materials. Amelia asks Crow to teach her to fight so she can be useful to Akira. Crow reveals the beastfolk's black cat phobia was caused by Night 100 years ago when he destroyed the beastfolk city, Adlea. Crow never blamed Night as he was merely a servant of the demon lord. Instead, he blames Gram, who murdered dozens of beastfolk in his desperation to escape Adlea, including Crow's sister. The evil mage who tricked Kilika suddenly attacks the city and introduces himself as Aurum Tres, a servant of the demon lord under orders to wipe out the city and leave only Amelia alive. Akira uses Shadow Magic to kill Aurum's monsters, though the strain makes him pass out.
6	"The Assassin Fights a Demon"; Transliteration: "Ansatsusha wa Mazoku to Tatakau" (Japanese: 暗殺者は魔族と戦う)	Akie Ishii	Akie Ishii, Mitsuru Ishihara & Seiji Okuda	November 11, 2025
Night is confused Akira's Shadow Magic activates on its own to prevent his death. Crow presents him with Yato-no-kami he has turned into two short swords. He also gives him a ring made by a previous hero that can guide its wearer to what they seek. The ring proves Amelia is in the labyrinth. Meanwhile, Aurum explains he can't teleport, so he needs to wait for his master to collect them. The woman Akira met back in Retice reveals herself as Lia Lagoon, Princess of Uruk, who reveals the Demon Lord wants Amelia's Resurrection magic. Aurum is confused by this since demons have almost infinite lifespans. Lia explains she was adopted into the royal family after a Dark Slime consumed everyone in her village. Using her royal authority she discovered Dark Slimes are tools used by Retice's King and Princess to kidnap people as sacrifices for the spell that summons heroes. Night helps Akira and Lia pass through the dungeon to reach Amelia. Night reveals the first Demon Lord did wage wars against the other races for banishing him to Volcano Continent, but demons haven't waged war in over 100 years and it is possible the current Demon Lord desires peace. They reach Amelia and Akira uses Shadow Magic to wound Aurum and defeat his monsters with help from Lia's Barrier Magic. Aurum's master Mahiro suddenly arrives, with Akira unsure how they will survive.
7	"The Assassin Makes A Vow"; Transliteration: "Ansatsusha wa Chikau" (Japanese: 暗殺者は誓う)	Hitoshi Okabe	Susumu Nishizawa	November 18, 2025 (Note: This episode aired at 1:36 a.m. JST, 6 minutes after the regular air time on TV Tokyo.)
Night advises Akira to stay alert when dealing against Mahiro. Mahiro puts Aurum behind his cover while dispels Lia's barrier effortlessly. When Akira was about to defend Mahiro's next attack, it shifts away from him and knocks Amelia out instead. Akira was angered by it but then cools himself down to ensures Amelia's survival. Mahiro then puts up a barrier to prevent them from escaping. Throughout their conversation, Akira found out that Mahiro was also a Japanese before he turn heels to Demon Lord's side. Akira barely stand his ground when engaging fight with Mahiro and Night proposes to cancel their master-servant pact in order to defeat Mahiro. Akira refuses and convinces Night to fight together. Then, Night transforms as Saran and launches numerous attacks on Mahiro but manages to land minor injuries only. Mahiro secretly creates a sneak attack by controlling Amelia to pierces through Akira's body barehanded. Upon regained her senses, Amelia freaked out when saw Akira's unconscious state caused by herself. The shadow system within Akira heals him while controlling his body to overpowers Mahiro briefly. Angered by the provocation from the system, Mahiro launch an attack on Amelia and Akira who regained senses dashes to shield her. Fortunately, Crow arrives to cancel Mahiro's attacks and causes Mahiro to retreat alongside Aurum. Akira wakes up after recovering for days and glad to see Amelia was fine. Crow shows up and reunites Akira with his classmates and Gilles surprisingly. He found out from Gilles that he was fired to ensure nobody will poses a threat to Retice Kingdom. Throughout their conversation, Amelia found out about their wish to go back to Japan and walks out from the room feeling down. Akira catches up to Amelia after their conversation and listen to her worries. Akira reassures Amelia by confessing his love to her and she reciprocates by confessing her love back to him. They each carved a ring mark on their ring finger as a couple vow and shared their first kiss together.
8	"The Assassin is Enchanted"; Transliteration: "Ansatsusha wa Mitoreru" (Japanese: 暗殺者は見蕩れる)	Kōji Sasaki	Takeshi Mori	November 25, 2025
Akira's classmates takes him to Mali City for its annual beauty pageant where several past winners have disappeared. Akira encounters demon girl Latticenail "Latty" who enters the pageant with the help of Amelia. Crow presents Akira an adventurer's badge, revealing he has been promoted to Yellow Rank. By contrast, Amelia is Silver and Kilika is one of only three Gold Ranks in the world. Crow admits despite appearances he is an old man, so killing Gram will be difficult as he employs powerful mercenaries. As Akira owes him a favor, Crow makes a request. In the pageant Amelia and Latty tied for first place. Night worries Latty's behaviour will upset her father, who he reveals as the Demon Lord. As Akira hasn't slept in days, Amelia uses a spell forcing him to sleep then confronts Crow about asking Akira to kill someone. Crow believes Akira's decision to never kill anyone is foolish but also claims if Akira were to kill someone; it would be to protect her. As predicted, Amelia and Latty are attacked by Gram's kidnappers. Amelia subdues them and forces them to admit the previous winners had their organs harvested. Amelia decides to kill them but Latty stops her as she considers killing an unforgivable crime. Trapped in sleep but watching through Amelia's eyes, Akira is glad he didn't have to see Amelia commit murder. He also worries how Amelia would react if he ever had to kill someone.
9	"The Assassin Goes Sightseeing"; Transliteration: "Ansatsusha wa Kankō Suru" (Japanese: 暗殺者は観光する)	Satoshi Toba	Akinori Kageyama, Mizuki Aoba & Iwao Teraoka	December 2, 2025
Akira meets with Gilles who reveals Crow was his father-figure. Gilles takes the classmates to the demon border while Akira heads to Uruk City to find Gram. Amelia asks Crow to train her, hoping Akira will never have to kill if she can protect herself. During their journey, Crow admits Amelia is uniquely skilled to keep up with his lessons and might even be able to master the Hero Spell Inversion, which not only cancels out opponent's spell but reflects it back at them. Crow admits thanks to his mother's experiments he has lived almost 400 years, twice as long as other beastfolk, and he is ready for it to be over once he has avenged his sister. Latty reappears to help Night spy on Gram for Akira. In Uruk Amelia is invited to meet King Igsam, Lia's foster father. Lia is shocked Crow is finally trying to pass Inversion to a worthy heir. Igsam attempts to hire Akira to assassinate Gram, but he refuses. For daring to refuse a royal request, Akira is challenged to a duel by the head of Igsam's royal knights, whom Akira defeats easily. Igsam spitefully insults his relationship with Amelia, pointing out Amelia will outlive Akira by centuries. Amelia is deeply upset by this. Crow tells Akira it was Gram that arranged Saran's assassination for the King of Retice.
10	"The Assassin Gazes Upon the River's Surface"; Transliteration: "Ansatsusha wa Kawamo o Mitsumeru" (Japanese: 暗殺者は川面を見つめる)	Shinnosuke Itō	Takeshi Mori	December 9, 2025
Crow demands Akira kill Gram or he will not guide them through the Demon Realm. Akira begins to consider killing Gram. Crow reveals Gram's secret is drugs that make his men stronger, so he is able to trade with demons, growing richer and expanding his army even more. Lia apologises for her father's behaviour. Everyone goes shopping but Amelia insists on going off with Akira, pointing out Lia is in love with Crow. Night and Latty learn Gram has stopped letting merchants transport goods to other cities and instead pays adventurers to do it, probably to make smuggling easier. Crow takes Lia to a field of Red Spider Lillies. As they represent the afterlife he felt it necessary to show their beauty to someone. Lia asks him about marriage but he claims he has dedicated his life to revenge and deserves nothing else. Tsukasa admits to Kyosuke his frustration about being heroes when they are barely stronger than normal humans, whereas Akira has real power and always seems in control. Akira fears Amelia won't love him if he kills Gram, but Amelia fears if he does it he will hate himself. Akira remembers his father leaving when he was young, so he became the main support for his sick mother and Yui. He fears if he becomes a murderer then returns to Japan he won't be able to face his family. Meanwhile, Yui and her mother worry about Akira and his classmates who have been missing for a month.
11	"The Assassin Browses"; Transliteration: "Ansatsusha wa Tachiyomi o Suru" (Japanese: 暗殺者は立ち読みをする)	Lee Ji-Hyang	Lee Ji-Hyang	December 16, 2025
Night and Latty arrive in Uruk. Akira sends them to the adventurer's guild to find evidence. Night discovers a secret room and recovers papers on the drug Gram gives his soldiers as well as records for illegal slavery and demons. Akira doesn't like how easy it was to find the evidence and Crow suggests Gram wanted them to be found. Gram, who did want the documents to be found, accuses four of his own men, executes one of them as a traitor and demands the others find the thief. Crow reveals the King of Retice is trying to start a war so the victims can be used to fuel the forbidden spell Equivalent Exchange, which would allow him to completely resurrect his deceased wife. Latty and Amelia get lunch while Night and Akira visit a book shop. Akira is so distracted a thief actually manages to steal his bag. Night retrieves the bag and Akira admits he can't bear the thought of ending someone's life, not even if it will prevent a war. Night admits murder is a burden to the soul, and if you do it often enough your soul starts to wear out. Akira decides to meet Gram and then decide if he deserves to die. He and Amelia visit the guild to wait for him. They meet Raul the adventurer, a fan of Akira's, and disabled guild secretary Kerria. Gram appears with four guards.
12	"Akira Oda Will Become an Assassin"; Transliteration: "Oda Akira wa Ansatsusha ni Naru" (Japanese: 織田晶は暗殺者になる)	Nobuyoshi Habara	Shigeru Ikeda	December 23, 2025
Gram orders Amelia kidnapped and Akira killed. Latty helps them escape the enhanced guards by revealing she can fly but then leaves the city, unwilling to witness the coming violence. Gram reveals he will sell Amelia to the demons for even rarer materials to make even stronger soldiers. Akira decides to kill Gram to protect Amelia. While preparing he discovers a crystal in his bag Gilles gave him from Saran, which reveals a message from Saran, reminding him returning home should be his goal, not revenge. Akira leaves, promising Crow to do what must be done, and asking Amelia to forgive him if she can. Akira infiltrates the mansion and kills Gram. Afterwards, he returns to Amelia and admits what scared him most was that he didn't feel anything while committing murder. He also hates that if he had accepted himself as an assassin earlier and killed the King of Retice, then Saran would still be alive. Amelia forgives him and promises to stay no matter what. With a psychic skill Kyosuke senses something has fundamentally changed within Akira's soul. Latty decides to continue towards her goal of confronting her father. Crow keeps his promise to guide them through the Demon realm. Akira vows to protect Amelia and bring his classmates back to Japan, even if he has to kill more people to do it.

=== Web game ===
A web game titled My Status as an Assassin Obviously Exceeds the Hero's Shadow Break (暗殺者である俺のステータスが勇者よりも明らかに強いのだが シャドウブレイク, Asashin de Aru no Sutētasu ga Yūsha Yori mo Akiraka ni Tsuyoi Nodaga Shadow Break), developed and published by CTW, was announced on February 18, 2025, concurrent with the anime's announcement.

== Reception ==
By July 2026, the series had over 1.7 million copies in circulation.

== See also ==
- Saving 80,000 Gold in Another World for My Retirement, another light novel series illustrated by Tōzai
- The Eminence in Shadow, another light novel series illustrated by Tōzai
- Accel World, another light novel series whose manga adaptation is illustrated by Hiroyuki Aigamo
