= Grimoire of Zero =

Japanese light novel series

- The cover of the first light novel, featuring the character Zero.

ゼロから始める魔法の書 (Zero kara Hajimeru Mahō no Sho)
- Genre: Fantasy
- Light novel
- Written by: Kakeru Kobashiri
- Illustrated by: Yoshinori Shizuma
- Published by: ASCII Media Works
- Imprint: Dengeki Bunko
- Original run: February 8, 2014 – December 10, 2017
- Volumes: 11
- Manga
- Written by: Kakeru Kobashiri
- Illustrated by: Takashi Iwasaki
- Published by: ASCII Media Works
- Magazine: Dengeki Maoh
- Original run: December 27, 2014 – December 10, 2017
- Volumes: 6
- Manga

Zero kara Hajimeru Mahō no Sho Nano!
- Written by: Yasuoka
- Published by: ASCII Media Works
- Magazine: Dengeki Maoh
- Original run: October 27, 2015 – March 27, 2017
- Volumes: 2
- Anime television series
- Directed by: Tetsuo Hirakawa
- Produced by: Hitoshi Kawamura; Yusuke Yoshioka; Koji Hyakutake; Fumiki Yamazaki; Mika Shimizu; Hirotaka Kaneko; Takema Okamura
- Written by: Tetsuo Hirakawa; Tatsuya Takahashi; Eiji Umehara; Akira Suzufuji
- Music by: Akito Matsuda
- Studio: White Fox
- Licensed by: AUS: Madman Entertainment; NA: Sentai Filmworks; SEA: Muse Communication; UK: MVM Films
- Original network: AT-X, Tokyo MX, Sun TV, KBS, BS Fuji
- Original run: April 10, 2017 – June 26, 2017
- Episodes: 12
- Related
- The Dawn of the Witch (sequel)

Grimoire of Zero (Japanese: ゼロから始める魔法の書, Hepburn: Zero kara Hajimeru Mahō no Sho; lit. 'Starting the Magical Book from Zero') is a Japanese light novel series written by Kakeru Kobashiri and illustrated by Yoshinori Shizuma. The light novel won the Grand Prize at the 20th annual Dengeki Novel Awards. ASCII Media Works has published it in eleven volumes from February 2014 to December 10, 2017. The series has received a manga adaptation illustrated by Takashi Iwasaki. A spin-off manga series, Zero kara Hajimeru Mahō no Sho Nano! (ゼロから始める魔法の書なの) has also been published and illustrated by Yasuoka. An anime television series adaptation by White Fox aired between April 10, 2017, and June 26, 2017.

== Plot ==
It is the year 526 of the Liturgical calendar. Witches and their sorcery are notorious throughout the land, though knowledge of the existence of magic remains elusive. A half-man, half-beast mercenary, his kind scorned by the populace, dreams day and night of becoming a human. However, his fateful encounter one day with a witch by the name of Zero turns his dreams into reality. She offers to turn him human if he will escort her as her guard on her search for a magical tome, one that possessed powerful knowledge which could wreak havoc in the wrong hands. The two begin their travels with this agreement binding them together, with the mercenary serving as Zero's protector, though he despises her kind.

== Characters ==
Zero (ゼロ)
Voiced by: Yumiri Hanamori (Japanese); AmaLee (English)
The title character. She is a witch, child-like in appearance, but presumably much older. She is proficient in both sorcery and magic, having created the latter by writing her very own spellbook called the "Grimoire of Zero". Despite her immense knowledge, she is clueless with regards to basic knowledge, such as the value of gems and monetary transactions. Situations that may normally embarrass others, hold no problem for her. She employed the Mercenary, after promising to grant him his true human form. Zero has shown an interest in growing closer to him as the series progresses. At the end of the novel series, the two of them help build a new town on the ruins of Mercenary's home village, opening a tavern and a fortune telling shop. She also seems to prefer the comfort of Mercenary's stomach fur to that of a real bed. She is the younger sister of Thirteen.
Mercenary (傭兵, Yōhei)
Voiced by: Tsuyoshi Koyama (Japanese); Jason Douglas (English)
He is a Beastfallen; people who are born cursed with the appearance of an animal. In his case it is a white tiger. It is revealed early on that Beastfallen were created by witches as soldiers. Whenever they were killed, the power that created them would return to the witch. However, if the witch was dead, it would pass on to her descendants making them Beastfallen. He is extremely proficient in fighting as well as cooking. The Mercenary has stated that it is his dream to one day open a tavern when he is human. Physically, he can outweigh most humans as well as even several Beastfallen. Despite being mistreated in his life, he has maintained himself as a better person. He has a gruff attitude, but is in fact a very kind person. He maintains this gruff demeanor and in a few cases, amplifies it, to make sure people remain wary of him and other Beastfallen who are not as kind as they have likely suffered abuse. His name remains unknown, as he was warned by Zero not to give his name out to witches who could use his name to control him. Since then, he has been referred to simply as Mercenary.
Albus (アルバス, Arubasu)
Voiced by: Yō Taichi (Japanese); Chelsea McCurdy (English)
A young girl who is a strong witch from the Mooncaller Clan. She is the late Sorena's granddaughter who had disguised herself as a boy to conceal her lineage. She initially attempted to try and kill Mercenary in order to take his head for a ritual that would increase her power. However, Albus was stopped by Zero and has since joined them. Despite this she occasionally jokes that she'll take Mercenary's head only to draw the latter's ire. She idolizes Zero as she is the one who wrote the legendary Grimoire of Zero, a small spellbook that harbors the very secrets of magic, a new, different and efficient form of power utilized by sorcerers and witches who cast powerful feats of sorcery.
Holdem (ホルデム, Horudemu)
Voiced by: Masayuki Kato (Japanese); David Wald (English)
A wolf Beastfallen. He was originally a prince who ran away from his family when he was caught having an affair and ended up living with Sorena. He asked Sorena to make him a Beastfallen to hide his royal lineage so that he could live out his life in peace. He was entrusted with taking care of Sorena's granddaughter (later revealed to be Albus) after Sorena was executed.
Thirteen (十三番, Jūsanban)
Voiced by: Takehito Koyasu (Japanese); Ian Sinclair (English)
The main antagonist of the first volume. He is an old associate of Zero's, later revealed to be her older brother, who was the only other survivor aside from Zero of the massacre that led to the theft of the Grimoire of Zero. Alike Zero and Albus, Thirteen does not use his real name and opts for his alias. Thirteen's main personality trait is his deadpan face and low voice. Despite this, he shares Zero's mannerisms when it comes to food including being punctual about meals. Since leaving the cave behind, he has become a Court Mage for a local kingdom in hopes of squashing the rogue mages who have learned magic from the Grimoire. However, his motives have come into question as he is manipulating the people in the kingdom he works for.
Sorena (ソーレナ)
Voiced by: Yoshiko Sakakibara (Japanese); Melissa Pritchett (English)
Sorena was the representative of the Mooncaller lineage and a great witch. While she used her power to help others, she was wrongly burned at the stake after humans mistakenly blamed her for spreading a plague. Her death triggered the rebellion by the witches in the Kingdom of Wenias, causing humanity to hunt the Witches. It was later revealed by Thirteen that the plague that Sorena was blamed for was actually started by accident thanks to an unnamed novice witch.

== Media ==
=== Light novels ===
The light novels were written by Kakeru Kobashiri and illustrated by Yoshinori Shizuma. The series won the grand prize at the 20th Dengeki Novel Awards in 2013. ASCII Media Works published the series in eleven volumes under its Dengeki Bunko imprint from February 8, 2014, to December 9, 2017.

No.	Title	Japanese release date	Japanese ISBN
1	Zero kara Hajimeru Mahō no Sho (ゼロから始める魔法の書)	February 8, 2014	978-4-04-866312-0
2	Akudiosu no Seijo (Jō) (アクディオスの聖女〈上〉)	November 8, 2014	978-4-04-866649-7
3	Akudiosu no Seijo (Ge) (アクディオスの聖女〈下〉)	February 10, 2015	978-4-04-869256-4
4	Kokuryū Tō no Maki (黒竜島の魔姫)	August 8, 2015	978-4-04-865306-0
5	Rakuen no Hakamori (楽園の墓守)	December 10, 2015	978-4-04-865565-1
6	Yomitsuki no Majo (Jō) (詠月の魔女〈上〉)	April 9, 2016	978-4-04-865913-0
7	Yomitsuki no Majo (Ge) (詠月の魔女〈下〉)	August 10, 2016	978-4-04-892276-0
8	Kinshokan no Shisho (禁書館の司書)	December 10, 2016	978-4-04-892539-6
9	Zero no Yōhei (Jō) (ゼロの傭兵〈上〉)	April 8, 2017	978-4-04-892824-3
10	ゼロから始める魔法の書X −ゼロの傭兵〈下〉	August 10, 2017	978-4-04-893274-5
11	ゼロから始める魔法の書XI ―獣と魔女の村づくり―	December 9, 2017	978-4-04-893521-0

=== Manga ===
A manga adaptation by Takeshi Iwasaki was serialized in ASCII Media Works' seinen manga magazine Dengeki Maoh from December 27, 2014, to December 10, 2017, and was collected into six volumes.

No.	Japanese release date	Japanese ISBN
1	May 9, 2015	978-4-04-865235-3
2	October 10, 2015	978-4-04-865433-3
3	March 10, 2016	978-4-04-865849-2
4	August 10, 2016	978-4-04-892271-5
5	January 10, 2017	978-4-04-892618-8
6	June 27, 2017	978-4-04-892975-2

Yasutake launched a spin-off manga, titled Zero Kara Hajimeru Mahō no Sho nano! (ゼロから始める魔法の書 なの！), in Dengeki Maoh on October 27, 2015. It finished on March 27, 2017, and was collected into two volumes.

=== Anime ===
An anime television series adaptation was announced at the Dengeki Fall Festival on October 2, 2016. The series is directed by Tetsuo Hirakawa and animated by the studio White Fox. Ryosuke Kimiya and Daisuke Mataga provided character designs for the anime. The series aired from April 10, 2017, to June 26, 2017. It ran for 12 episodes. The opening theme titled "Hakken-sha wa Watashi" (発見者はワタシ) is performed by Tapimiru and the ending theme titled "Hajimari no Shirushi" (はじまりのしるし) is performed by Chima. Sentai Filmworks have licensed the anime and it was streamed on Amazon's Anime Strike. MVM Films released the series in the United Kingdom.

No.	Title (Note: All English titles are taken from Amazon Video.)	Original release date
1	"The Witch and the Beastfallen"; Transliteration: "Majo to Kemono Ochi" (Japanese: 魔女と獣堕ち)	April 10, 2017
The Mercenary, an unnamed white tiger Beastfallen, finds himself constantly on the run from bounty hunters and witches. He stumbles across a hungry little girl, who traps his latest attacker in a mud prison and reveals herself as a witch. Despite his initial suspicions of her, the Mercenary decides to share his soup and join her quest as her bodyguard to find a grimoire from a mage named Thirteen. The witch, later recognized as Zero, draws up a blood contact as a promise to return the Mercenary as a human after her quest is complete. However, the Mercenary tears up the contact and initiates a blood oath using their thumbs. The next day, Zero shows the Mercenary the difference between "sorcery" and "magic" against a boar in a forest, in which sorcery requires a magic circle while magic does not. Zero uses her knowledge to negate the spell of a boy who attacks them. Zero is revealed to be the one who wrote the grimoire that the boy and his comrades used to learn magic.
2	"Witch-Hunting"; Transliteration: "Majogari" (Japanese: 魔女狩り)	April 17, 2017
The boy, recognized as Albus, accepts his defeat and joins Zero and the Mercenary on their trip. When they stop at a nearby spring to rest, Albus spots a ring in the water and decides to keep it. As the three head to a nearby village, a farmer gives them each a tomato and the mayor shows them to their lodge. The villagers hostilely accuse Albus of stealing the ring from a granny with a long braid, but Albus responds by defending an infamous witch named Sorena, who was burned at the stake for using sorcery. Not wanting to get the higher authorities involved, the Mercenary runs away, carrying the two witches with him to their lodge to hide. Zero tells the Mercenary that Sorena, who was a Mooncaller, was wrongfully accused for spreading a rat plague in the village. The villagers hunt down and eventually corner Zero, the Mercenary and Albus in the forest. The granny helps them escape, revealing herself to be a witch who gave up her powers to marry a normal human, with the ring as a wedding gift from Sorena shortly before her death sentence.
3	"Duel"; Transliteration: "Kettō" (Japanese: 決闘)	April 24, 2017
Zero and Albus act as concubines of the Mercenary in order to be allowed inside the gates of Formicum, much to the Mercenary's embarrassment. The Mercenary demands that Zero should buy herself a new outfit. The Mercenary and Albus help pick out Zero's attire at a clothing store, but the Mercenary quickly throws Zero into the changing room for briefly being immodest. The fat bald tailor gleefully yet creepily accepts Zero's old robe as payment for new outfit. The trio struggles to find lodging at an inn for the night. After the Mercenary rescues a lady from a bear Beastfallen in an alley, a werewolf Beastfallen points the Mercenary towards an inn that accepts non-humans. At night, the Mercenary sneaks out to a bar, but Zero follows him there. The werewolf Beastfallen, later recognized as Holdem, reappears and offers to trade his three "witches" for Zero. The Mercenary refuses, suspecting that they are just normal slave ladies, and instead follows Holdem back home to free them. However, Holdem spots the Mercenary and challenges him to a duel. The Mercenary knocks Holdem unconscious and frees the slave ladies, while Zero strips Holdem of the fur on his torso and tail.
4	"The Road to Latette"; Transliteration: "Ratetto e no dōchū" (Japanese: ラテットへの道中)	May 1, 2017
After Zero assists the Mercenary in taking a bath, the trio continue on their journey. As Zero sees a couple kissing, the Mercenary teaches her that a "kiss" is a way to show love, not some sort of ritual. Outside the gates, the trio witnesses a badger Beastfallen being a jerk to a female kid with dark red hair, who has a wound on her ankle. Zero orders the Mercenary to treat the kid's wound with ointment and bandage it up, while Zero herself discreetly uses healing magic. During their travel to Latette, they eventually stop at a stream. Zero explains that her grimoire is divided into four books, them being hunting, capture, harvest and protection, while a practitioner's personality and emotions are directly related to magic proficiency. With that in mind, Albus is able catch fish using magic. At night, the Mercenary discusses his dream of opening a tavern after becoming a human. Albus mentions that his parents died in a witch hunt, while Zero barely remembers her parents from spending her life in a cave studying sorcery. As the group finally reaches Latette by daybreak, they are shocked to discover all the townspeople appear to be dead.
5	"The Sorcerers of Zero"; Transliteration: "Zero no majutsu shidan" (Japanese: ゼロの魔術師団)	May 8, 2017
As the trio surveys the dead townspeople of Latette, Zero notes that multiple types of classical element magic were used against the townspeople, but most of the buildings were left standing. Zero prevents Albus from attacking a looter with a scar on his face, who tells the Mercenary about a hooded mage who is impervious to magic attacks. After the trio is unable to locate the grimoire in the library of a church, Albus finds and tries to heal an old man sorcerer nearly dead meat. Before dying, the sorcerer tells Albus that the hooded mage caused other sorcerers to disintegrate when they used magic bows and arrows. As there are also dead mages who had their magic stolen, Albus deduces that the one behind this is none other than Thirteen. The Mercenary is suddenly trapped in a forced summoning spell until Zero wakes him up. The trio ends up in a dungeon, where Thirteen appears and tells them that he was hired by the king to kill a town full of rebellious mages in exchange for help in searching for the grimoire. Zero and Thirteen then engage in a magic battle, with the Mercenary unable to interfere.
6	"Thirteen"; Transliteration: "Jūsanban" (Japanese: 十三番)	May 15, 2017
Zero and Thirteen abruptly stop their fight when they hear a dinner bell. Thirteen leads the trio to the dining hall, revealing that the forced summoning spell transported them inside the palace of the royal capital Plasta. After their meal, Zero and Thirteen discuss that they are both searching for the grimoire that Zero wrote in the caves, since it was stolen by their master who killed all of the other witches who lived there. Disagreeing with Thirteen's views of justice, Albus is offered one night to choose between joining Thirteen or being burned at the stake. Zero confirms that she and Thirteen were the only two survivors in the caves. She wrote the grimoire so that witches and humans can live in harmony, but she should have heeded Thirteen's warning and burned the grimoire before incurring any damage. Later that night, Thirteen summons the Mercenary and offers a potion that could turn him into a human. Thirteen tells the Mercenary to leave the castle, claiming that Zero is ultimately using him for a sacrifice. When the Mercenary runs into Zero on his way out of the castle, she berates him for being deceived by Thirteen and terminates their contract.
7	"Plasta, the Royal Capital"; Transliteration: "Ōto purasuta" (Japanese: 王都プラスタ)	May 22, 2017
As Plasta prepares for a festival, the Mercenary knocks out a drunken pig Beastfallen, who tries to steal liquor from a salesmen. Rochelle, a girl who works at an empty tavern, enlists the Mercenary since she is temporarily understaffed. He impresses her with his cooking skills and tells her that he plans to open a tavern of his own when he becomes a human. After he leaves upstairs, a deer Beastfallen, a frog Beastfallen and a cow Beastfallen annoy Rochelle and her father for their poor customer service. When the Mercenary hears the commotion, he knocks out the other Beastfallen before leaving the tavern. Later in the forest, the Mercenary is attacked by witches led by Holdem, who momentarily gets shot in the back. The Mercenary takes out the witches until he gets shot in the stomach. Back at the dungeon, Zero prepares to fight Thirteen until she suddenly coughs up blood as the Mercenary is magically healed. The Mercenary prepares to feast on the remaining witch but stops himself. He comes across the wounded Holdem, who begs him for help for the sake of the great witch Sorena's granddaughter, who might hold the grimoire.
8	"Sorena's Granddaughter"; Transliteration: "Sōrena no magomusume" (Japanese: ソーレナの孫娘)	May 29, 2017
While recovering from his injuries, Holdem tells the Mercenary that he used to be a noble knight as a human who fled his position after being caught having an affair with his brother's infidels. After encountering Sorena in a forest, Holdem asked her to transform him into a werewolf Beastfallen so he could stay with her and her granddaughter. Although Holdem tried to save Sorena from being captured by the villagers from before, Sorena gave herself up and entrusted Holdem with her granddaughter. However, Sorena's granddaughter left Holdem in search for answers. Back at the castle, Zero finds herself unable to escape her room, while Albus continues to refuse Thirteen's offer to join his cause. The Mercenary overhears from a traveling man with stupid facial hair that Albus is going to be burned at the stake. As the Mercenary and Holdem rush to the palace square, Holdem is shocked to discover that Albus is actually Sorena's granddaughter. The Mercenary and Holdem rescue Albus from the stake and steal a carriage, but Thirteen sends knights after them outside the castle. After the Mercenary, Albus and Holdem fall off a cliff, Thirteen is convinced that the three are still alive.
9	"Reunion"; Transliteration: "Saikai" (Japanese: 再会)	June 5, 2017
After the Mercenary, Albus and Holdem recover, the Mercenary learns from Albus that Thirteen plans on killing all the rogue witches and the sorcerers. Since all the sorcerers signed a blood contract with Thirteen, Albus proposes to draw five magic circles that would connect into a larger magic circle, thus cancelling the magic of sorcerers without killing them. Albus mentions that while he was locked in an underground cell, Zero collapsed and was taken away somewhere by Thirteen. The Mercenary, Albus and Holdem escape from six assassin servants sent by Thirteen. They decide to head back to Formicum so Albus can use Zero's old robe to pinpoint Zero's current location. As Albus says that Zero is being held in a tower inside the castle back in Plasta, the Mercenary sets off to rescue Zero by climbing the steep cliff, while Albus and Holdem begin to set up the magic circles. However, some surviving sorcerers stop Albus as she finishes the second magic circle, inspired by her words during the execution before she was rescued. After Albus announces her intent to end magic forever, the sorcerers decide to put her on trial.
10	"The Truth Revealed"; Transliteration: "Akasa re ta shinsō" (Japanese: 明かされた真相)	June 12, 2017
The Mercenary finally infiltrates the tower where Zero is being held, and they embrace upon their reunion. However, they fall into another forced summoning spell set by Thirteen. Meanwhile, Albus and Holdem are held captive by the surviving sorcerers, who receive word from their leader to prepare a spell powerful enough to kill Thirteen. As Holdem tries to untie himself, a braided-haired female sorcerer and a brown-haired male sorcerer order the other sorcerers to take Holdem to be sacrificed. The Mercenary awakens back in the dungeon with Thirteen, while Zero is trapped in a magic-sealed cage. Thirteen, who actually was carrying the grimoire this entire time, acted as both an official state sorcerer and the leader of the sorcerers in a plot to destroy all the sorcerers for supposedly choosing to use their powers against humans. After forcing the Mercenary to grovel before him, Thirteen claims that his plot would ultimately bring about the "perfect world" that Zero wanted. As the Mercenary provokes Thirteen into anger, the former uses the potion to destroy the cage holding Zero. An old male sorcerer sympathetically frees Holdem, who then prepares to rescue Albus before the other sorcerers carry out their attack.
11	"The Witch and The Sorcerer"; Transliteration: "Majo to majutsu shi" (Japanese: 魔女と魔術師)	June 19, 2017
Zero and Thirteen face off casting identical ghost spells, with the Mercenary witnessing the battle. As Zero is about to hit to by Thirteen's ghost spell, the Mercenary takes the attack, but Zero gets injured due to the blood oath that she secretly implemented during his bath earlier. Meanwhile, Albus continues to urge the sorcerers to follow his cause of erasing all magic. When Zero regains consciousness, she reveals that her spells appear to be different because she intentionally put subtle errors in the grimoire as a protection measure in case it fell into the wrong hands. Realizing that he will never surpass Zero, Thirteen gives up on his ambition and decides to help Zero seal the magic. Albus is rescued by Holdem, and the two escape from the sorcerers, meeting up with Zero, the Mercenary and Thirteen in the forest. Having learned the truth that Thirteen is the revered state sorcerer, Albus tries to kill Thirteen, not realizing that killing him means that she disappears due to her blood contract. Thirteen nullifies the contract, allowing her to kill him, but he asks Albus to give him a chance to fix the problems that he caused.
12	"The Grimoire of Zero"; Transliteration: "Zero kara hajimeru mahō no sho" (Japanese: ゼロから始める魔法の書)	June 26, 2017
Thirteen theorizes that Sorena's sacrifice started a war of witches against humans. The Mercenary's group splits up, drawing one of five magic circles at a designated point and meeting up in the center. While Zero and Thirteen perform the ritual, the Mercenary and Holdem protect them from the sorcerers. As Albus arrives to help with the final part of the ritual, the Mercenary's body is used as a vessel to seal the magic in the Kingdom of Wenias, ending the war. Three days later, the Mercenary wakes up and is still a Beastfallen because Zero's magic has weakened. Zero finally has her grimoire back from Thirteen. Albus, now the official state sorcerer, has Thirteen burned at the stake in the palace square in order to unite humanity, but the stake is set up so that Thirteen can secretly escape while the flames obscure the vision of the crowd. Before Zero and the Mercenary depart, Albus kisses the Mercenary on the cheek, much to Holdem's chagrin. Zero not only reveals that Thirteen is her older brother, but also considers about having a romantic relationship with the Mercenary. However, the Mercenary insists that he is only there for her protection.
