= The Dawn of the Witch =

Japanese light novel series

- First light novel volume cover

魔法使い黎明期 (Mahōtsukai Reimeiki)
- Genre: Fantasy
- Light novel
- Written by: Kakeru Kobashiri
- Illustrated by: Takashi Iwasaki
- Published by: Kodansha
- English publisher: NA: Kodansha USA
- Imprint: Kodansha Ranobe Bunko
- Original run: August 31, 2018 – July 1, 2022
- Volumes: 6
- Manga
- Written by: Kakeru Kobashiri
- Illustrated by: Tatsuwo
- Published by: Kodansha
- English publisher: NA: Kodansha USA
- Magazine: Monthly Shōnen Sirius
- Original run: July 26, 2019 – May 25, 2023
- Volumes: 7
- Anime television series
- Directed by: Satoshi Kuwabara
- Produced by: Atsushi Aitani; Maya Fujino; Makoto Furukawa; Shinji Kawaguchi; Nobuhiko Kurosu; Takaaki Nakaome; Tomoyuki Oowada; Junichirou Tanaka
- Written by: Satoshi Kuwabara
- Music by: Tatsuhiko Saiki
- Studio: Tezuka Productions (Note: Animation production assistance (アニメーション制作協力) for all episodes provided by DR Movie.)
- Licensed by: Crunchyroll (streaming); SA/SEA: Muse Communication
- Original network: TBS, BS11
- Original run: April 8, 2022 – July 1, 2022
- Episodes: 12
- Related
- Grimoire of Zero (prequel)
- icon

The Dawn of the Witch (魔法使い黎明期, Mahōtsukai Reimeiki) is a Japanese fantasy light novel series written by Kakeru Kobashiri and illustrated by Takashi Iwasaki, with partial character designs by Yoshinori Shizuma, and a spinoff sequel of Kobashiri's earlier series Grimoire of Zero. Kodansha have published six volumes since August 2018 under their Kodansha Ranobe Bunko imprint. A manga adaptation with art by Tatsuwo was serialized in Kodansha's shōnen manga magazine Monthly Shōnen Sirius from July 2019 to May 2023. It was collected in seven tankōbon volumes. The light novel and manga are licensed in North America by Kodansha USA. An anime television series adaptation by Tezuka Productions aired from April to July 2022.

== Premise ==
Following the global chaos caused by the Grimoire of Zero and a subsequent great calamity, a fragile peace exists in the realm of Wenias, where Headmaster Albus strives for human-witch coexistence. As part of these efforts, the amnesiac and failing student Saybil is sent on a special training program to a remote witches' village, escorted by the witch Loux Krystas and other students, including the honor student Holt.

Their journey is immediately imperiled by an attack from fiends, during which Holt is revealed to be a collaborator. In the ensuing confrontation, Holt ultimately turns on the fiends, and Saybil unlocks a latent power within Loux's staff to save them. The group survives this betrayal and attack, and continues its fraught journey toward the village.

== Characters ==
=== Main ===
Saybil the Abyss Sorcerer (セービル, Sēbiru)
Voiced by: Shūichirō Umeda (Japanese); Travis Mullenix (English)
Saybil is a struggling student at the Royal Academy of Magic in the realm of Wenias, with no memories of his boyhood past other than a silver-haired witch with eyes the same as his. He claims that he can wield powerful magic but chooses not to use it, as he is afraid of his infinite magical powers going out of control, all of which is inherited from his long-lost father the infamous high sorcerer Thirteen who had "stolen" the Grimoire of Zero and was supposedly executed for instigating war between witches and humans more than a decade ago. He earns his title as "Abyss Sorcerer" from his aunt Zero as a reference to his boundless magic being like a bottomless pit, which is one of the meanings of "abyss". He ends up leaving with Kudo and Holt upon finally graduating and has accepted a job on gathering more information on Remnants of Disaster at the Forbidden Library.
Professor Loux Krystas Laos the Dawn Witch (ロー・クリスタス, Rō Kurisutasu)
Voiced by: Miho Okasaki (Japanese); Monica Rial (English)
A three hundred-year-old witch girl with a semi-sentient mystical staff of Luden that can take on different forms and supposedly eats other witches who touch it by absorbing all of their uniquely powerful magic into itself, thus killing them in the process. Professor Loux agrees to escort Saybil on his mission, in hopes of getting to read the renowned yet dangerous Grimoire of Zero, or meet Zero herself. How she was given longevity and perpetual youth remains a mystery. She was great friends with Sorena the most high Mooncaller Witch until her wrongful demise by pyre. After exposing Bishop Edmeanor's plot in inciting further war against witches, sorcerers and humans by using his own miniature Remnant of Disaster against him, she goes to be rewarded by finally reading the legendary Grimoire of Zero at the Forbidden Library.
Holt the Deer Beastfallen Witch (ホルト, Horuto)
Voiced by: Sayumi Suzushiro (Japanese); Kimmie Britt (English)
A sixteen-year-old fourth-year student at the Academy, making her somewhat more experienced in magic than Saybil. In contrast to him, Holt is a top student in her class. She was born a beastfallen deer, but is capable of maintaining her humanoid looks, much unlike Mercenary, Holdem or Kudo. According to Zero's extensive expertise, she will be strong enough to lay waste to dozens of armies in mere seconds with her magic alone in the next decade. She ends up leaving with Kudo and Saybil upon finally graduating and has accepted a job on gathering more information on Remnants of Disaster at the Forbidden Library.
Kudo the Lizard Beastfallen Sorcerer (クドー, Kudō)
Voiced by: Taku Yashiro (Japanese); Joe Cucinotti (English)
A lizard beastfallen student at the Academy with a brusque demeanor, but deep down, cares for his friends and tries to protect them in his own way. He is adept at protection magic, being able to become a long-lived sorcerer and most powerful physician if he continues developing and perfecting his magical talents in healing spells from the chapter of Protection from the legendary Grimoire of Zero. He ends up leaving with Saybil and Holt upon finally graduating and has accepted a job on gathering more information on Remnants of Disaster at the Forbidden Library.

=== Recurring ===
Zero the Mud-Black Witch (泥闇の魔女, Doro Yami no Majo)
Voiced by: Yumiri Hanamori (Japanese); AmaLee (English)
Zero was the main female protagonist/titular character of the prequel series, Grimoire of Zero. She originally traveled with a half man/half beast called Mercenary in search of a book called the Grimoire of Zero that hides a mighty magical power that can destroy the world in its entirety. Over the next decade, she has grown into a tall, beautiful and captivating woman with even greater magical ability than ever before, though not as powerful as Saybil's. She reveals herself to be the paternal aunt of Saybil. For quite some time, she has been suffering a severe case of magical reduction due to sacrificing a vast amount of her mana to revive her lover, Mercenary, from death in the previous series, leaving her quite vulnerable to her adversaries and from dying, which was the very reason why her elder brother, Thirteen, had sired Saybil for the boy's limitless powerful magic to be transferred to her. This is indeed done as a last resort for his famous aunt to become strong to defend everyone from the imminent massacre approaching the village.
Mercenary the Tiger Beastfallen (傭兵, Yōhei)
Voiced by: Masaaki Yano (Japanese); Jason Douglas (English)
The white tiger beastfallen who was the main protagonist of the prequel series, Grimoire of Zero. In the next decade his face has grown rounder, and he has managed to fulfill his dream of owning a tavern for beastfallen, witches and humans alike. He continues to be fiercely loyal to the teenage Zero, now his wife, and will do whatever is necessary to ensure the severely magically depleted Mud-Black Witch's safety those she cherishes such as Saybil, for being her nephew.
Shinpu the Blind Priest (神父, Shinpu)
Voiced by: Masaaki Mizunaka (Japanese); Christopher Wehkamp (English)
Formerly a killer and member of the Church who recently reformed who debuted in Episode 3 "Beyond the Steam". Due to photosensitivity, he dons a black material over his eyes which he removes only at night; revealing them to gray. He is quite calm and levelheaded regardless of his former status as a ruthless murderer. He is an expert at detecting lies from others by overseeing their micro-expressions.
Albus the Mooncaller Witch (アルバス, Arubasu)
Voiced by: Yō Taichi (Japanese); Chelsea McCurdy (English)
The Headmaster of the very first Royal Magic Academy and a very powerful witch in her own right, as the only descendant/grandchild of the renowned Mooncaller Witch Sorena. Her blonde hair is now waist-length but her feminine name is still unknown, despite her true gender as female has been known for one whole decade.
Holdem the Wolf Beastfallen (ホルデム, Horudemu)
Voiced by: Masayuki Katō (Japanese); David Wald (English)
A wolf Beastfallen and swordsman who sees his duty as serving Headmistress Albus since the vow he had made to her deceased grandmother Sorena of the Moon Caller Witch Clan. His face is quite different from the original anime, being more whitish and rounder.
Lilly the Mouse Beastfallen (リーリ, Rīri)
Voiced by: Manaka Iwami (Japanese); Macy Anne Johnson (English)
A white mouse beastfallen with a squeaky voice and a child-like appearance but is, in truth, more than two decades old. She is very timid and does not like crowds. She is quite incredible at cooking.

=== Supporting ===
Laios
Laios is a young human boy who befriends the amnesic Saybil once he has lived in his home village for two months as a way to replenish the strong magic of those who have used it for too long. He knows the forest well, but ends up getting hurt badly by encountering a Remnant of Disaster, and is saved by the renowned Mud-Black Witch and Dawn Witch.
Uls
Uls is the father of Laois who helped with the test by staying home with his wife and young son. He then joined at the Mercenary's bar for a drink in celebration for Saybil Kudo and Holt for passing with flying colors as students in the field program.
Kady
Kady was a penniless boy whom the Anti-Witch Church had recruited as an assassin to eradicate "evil" witches. He was found by the immortal Dawn Witch, Professor Loux Krystas, with his face swollen by bees. He is then interrogated by Shinpu, who utilized his unique ability of lie detection, to ascertain whether more Remnants of Disaster had come with him. While enjoying himself with Mrs. Hearthful and her young students, which had included Laois, he became possessed by another rouge Remnant of Disaster and was ultimately killed from its malevolent influence and Holt's stronger Flagis spell. He was buried outside the village church.
Ms. Heartful (ハルスフル)
Voiced by: Saori Ōnishi
A redheaded bespectacled woman who teaches at the village school for human children, such as Laios, who debuted in Episode Nine. She was from the north and came to live in a village for both witches and humans, even though her home and family was attacked by a witch. The Tyrant himself seems to develop a crush on her, despite his strong feeling bloodlust.

== Production ==
Kodansha Ranobe Bunko imprint sent their invitation to Kakeru Kobashiri for writing a sequel of Grimoire of Zero around November to December in 2017, and the publishment was confirmed in February 2018. It was announced in her blog in March 2018. She finished writing Volume 1 and revealed the synopsis of the sequel at that time. Although some main characters in Grimoire of Zero would be included, the protagonist would be someone else.

== Media ==
=== Light novels ===
The light novel series is written by Kakeru Kobashiri and illustrated by Takashi Iwasaki, with partial character designs by Yoshinori Shizuma. Kodansha have published six volumes since August 2018 under their Kodansha Ranobe Bunko imprint. In March 2022, Kodansha USA announced they licensed the novels for English publication.

No.	Original release date	Original ISBN	English release date	English ISBN
1	August 31, 2018	978-4-06-513295-1	October 25, 2022	978-1-64-729185-3
2	March 1, 2019	978-4-06-515377-2	January 31, 2023	978-1-64-729186-0
3	May 6, 2021	978-4-06-523116-6	June 2, 2023	978-1-64-729187-7
4	November 2, 2021	978-4-06-526017-3	October 17, 2023	978-1-64-729188-4
5	April 1, 2022	978-4-06-527823-9	February 13, 2024	978-1-64-729231-7
6	July 1, 2022	978-4-06-528852-8	June 11, 2024	978-1-64-729348-2

=== Manga ===
A manga adaptation with art by Tatsuwo was serialized in Kodansha's shōnen manga magazine Monthly Shōnen Sirius from July 26, 2019, to May 25, 2023. Its chapters were collected in seven tankōbon volumes, released from January 9, 2020, to July 7, 2023. The manga is licensed in North America by Kodansha USA.

No.	Original release date	Original ISBN	English release date	English ISBN
1	January 9, 2020	978-4-06-518250-5	March 23, 2021	978-1-63-699009-5
2	August 6, 2020	978-4-06-520485-6	April 27, 2021	978-1-63-699064-4
3	March 9, 2021	978-4-06-522628-5	July 13, 2021	978-1-63-699222-8
4	October 7, 2021	978-4-06-525122-5	March 15, 2022	978-1-63-699608-0
5	April 7, 2022	978-4-06-527575-7	September 13, 2022	978-1-68-491441-8
6	December 8, 2022	978-4-06-530084-8	May 9, 2023	978-1-68-491934-5
7	July 7, 2023	978-4-06-532390-8	December 12, 2023	979-8-88-933292-3

=== Anime ===
In April 2021, an anime television series adaptation was announced. It is produced by Tezuka Productions and directed by Satoshi Kuwabara, who will also handle the series' scripts. Kakeru Kobashiri, the original writer, and Mayumi Morita are credited for literature, while character designs are provided by Reina Iwasaki. Tatsuhiko Saiki is composing the music. It aired from April 8 to July 1, 2022, on TBS and BS11. (Note: TBS lists the series premiere at 25:58 on April 7, 2022, which is effectively 1:58 a.m. JST on April 8.) The opening theme song is "Dawn of Infinity" by fripSide, while the ending theme song is "Imprinting" by ▽▲TRiNITY▲▽. Crunchyroll streamed the series outside of Asia. Muse Communication licensed the series in South and Southeast Asia.

On April 11, 2022, Crunchyroll announced that the series will receive an English dub, which premiered on April 21.

No.	Title	Directed by (Note: Information is taken from the ending credits of each episode.)	Storyboarded by	Original release date
1	"The Remedial Student and the Witch of the Staff"; Transliteration: "Rettōsei to Tsue no Majo" (Japanese: 劣等生と杖の魔女)	Yuri Uema	Satoshi Kuwabara	April 8, 2022
Saybil is a student with the lowest grade in Wenias Royal Magic of Academy. For an unknown reason, he has lost all his memories before entering the academy and that has led to an empty life while he was there. One day, the headmaster, Albus, called for Saybil and instructed him to participate in a special training in which he must spread awareness of useful magic in a region where witch hunts are still happening. In order to achieve his goals, Saybil started his journey to the village along with his guide professor, Loux Krystas.
2	"Don't Call Me a Traitor"; Transliteration: "Uragirimono to Yobanaide" (Japanese: 裏切り者と呼ばないで)	Fumio Maezono	Satoshi Kuwabara	April 15, 2022
Saybil started his journey together with Professor Loux and the talented fellow student, Holt, to their special training place. Unfortunately, they are being targeted by people who are still resentful of the witches. Meanwhile, Kudo, the Beastfallen that went separately from Saybil fell into a predicament as he was attacked by the Arbitrator of Dia Ignis. Loux went alone in order to rescue her student, but Saybil and Holt couldn't simply stay and do nothing, especially after hearing Kudo's scream.
3	"Beyond the Steam"; Transliteration: "Yukemuri no Mukōgawa" (Japanese: 湯けむりの向こうがわ)	Masahiko Suzuki	Satoshi Kuwabara	April 22, 2022
After managing to repel the Arbitrator of Dia Ignis, Kudo now joins Saybil's group on their journey to the special training village. Along the way, Saybil, Holt and Kudo learned many things from Loux. As all of them shared their past and origin, a bond between each and all of them starts to grow. After further travels, the group arrives at a large town. While they wash away their exhaustion from their trip in a large public bath, someone unexpectedly shows up in front of Saybil and Kudo.
4	"I'm Not Afraid to Die"; Transliteration: "Boku wa Shinu no wa Kowaku Nai" (Japanese: 僕は死ぬのは怖くない)	Taiji Kawanishi	Satoshi Kuwabara	April 29, 2022
After saving the young boy, Laios, from the fierce-looking Beastfallen, Saybil and his friends finally reached the special training village. At a church on the edge of the village, they met Shinpu the Blind Priest who have both of his eyes covered with an eyepatch. According to him, the supervising witch is no longer there and the village has been under control of another witch since the last two years. Shinpu told them to turn back and as the students were about to lose hope, Loux suspected Shinpu to be the witch's underling.
5	"I Decide Who's Worthy"; Transliteration: "Fusawashii ka wa Jibun de Kimeru" (Japanese: ふさわしいかは自分で決める)	Masami Hata	Satoshi Kuwabara	May 6, 2022
Saybil and Loux went inside a cave in order to rescue Hort. In there, Saybil met the only person he knew from his previous memory, Zero. She shows a heavy obsession towards Saybil, saying that he is a very special existence and that she took over the village for him. After being told that she hurt his friends for his sake, Saybil is filled with rage. As he faced her together with Loux, another layer of truth about the special training was then revealed.
6	"Knowledge of Ignorance"; Transliteration: "Muchi no Chi" (Japanese: 無知の知)	Isamu Yamaguchi	Satoshi Kuwabara	May 13, 2022
Saybil, Holt and Kudo managed to pass the special training test. Now, under Zero's guidance, they started working on their special training. Now, they are instructed to help the village by using magic. Holt started working as the village's handyman while Kudo works as an assistant at the clinic. Saybil started working as a magic resupplier, but he ends up staying inside his shop all the time. Worried about Saybil's situation, Loux sent Saybil outside the shop on an errand.
7	"I Can't Save Anything"; Transliteration: "Boku ni wa Nani mo Sukuenai" (Japanese: 僕には何も救えない)	Yūji Kanzaki	Satoshi Kuwabara	May 27, 2022 (Note: This episode was originally scheduled to air on May 20, 2022, but it was delayed to May 27, 2022.)
Holt hit Mercenary with her magic and Kudo collapsed after running out of magic. While they felt down, they wish to improve and seek advices from Zero. However, as Saybil has done nothing but simply act as a magic depot, Zero told him cold and harshly that if he has no intention of becoming a mage, then there is nothing for him to learn in the village. As Saybil was thinking about which path he should take while exploring the forest together with Laios, they faced an incredible danger.
8	"Respective Costs"; Transliteration: "Sorezore no Daishō" (Japanese: それぞれの代償)	Fumio Maezono	Seiji Handa	June 3, 2022
Saybil and Laios were attacked by a Remnant of Disaster in the forest. With such dangerous being on the loose in the forest by someone, everyone in the village is in high alert. At that moment, Holdem from Royal Magic of Academy arrived at the village. While he claims that he is there just for an inspection, the students find it hard to trust him. Meanwhile, after failing to protect Laios, Saybil renewed his determination to learn magic and become a proper mage. However, the Tyrant managed to slip into the village and managed to kidnap Saybil.
9	"A Stone Cast in the Pond"; Transliteration: "Nagekomareta Ishi" (Japanese: 投げ込まれた石)	Yuri Uema	Wataru Chihara	June 10, 2022
Saybil has regained his lost memory, but he still doesn't understand what it means to love someone. After consulting about it with Holt, Saybil seems to start to believe that he loves Professor Loux. Meanwhile, Zero tells Saybil about her brother and Saybil's father, the sorcerer Thirteen.
10	"Snack Time"; Transliteration: "Oyatsu no Jikan" (Japanese: おやつのじかん)	Fumio Maezono	Satoshi Kuwabara	June 17, 2022 (Note: This episode aired at 2:30 a.m. JST, 32 minutes after the original air time on TBS.)
Kudo and the others are watching over Kady, the boy that was sent by the Anti-Witch Faction side of the Church into the Witch's village. He has been brainwashed to regard Witches and Beastfallens as enemies. However, after tasting Lilly's delicious food and peaceful days in the village, his obstinate heart is starting to mellow out. Meanwhile, Saybil and Loux are experimenting on magic potions. In the midst of that, Saybil shoved his affection toward Loux in a very straightforward way that overwhelms Loux. Unfortunately, the peaceful days are about to end abruptly.
11	"Determination to Kill"; Transliteration: "Korosu Ketsui" (Japanese: 殺す決意)	Taiji Kawanishi	Seiji Handa	June 24, 2022
Holt, Kudo and Tyrant risked their life to stop Kady. Saybil regretted not being able to help his friends. Meanwhile, news that the Anti-Witch faction is about to turn the witch village into a battlefield and the students are ordered to return to the academy. The students wished to stay and help in the battle, but they are threatened with expulsion if they don't return to the academy.
12	"The Beginning of the Adventure"; Transliteration: "Bōken no Makuake" (Japanese: 冒険の幕開け)	Masami Hata	Satoshi Kuwabara	July 1, 2022
An army of 10,000 advanced toward the village, but the traps that Saybil and the others made have successfully driven away much of the enemies. However, a group of Beastfallen mercenaries manages to skilfully avoid the traps and continue advancing. Saybil, Holt and Kudo prepare to fight the enemy head-on to protect the place dear to them.
