= Demon City Blues =

Japanese novel series by Hideyuki Kikuchi

- Author: Hideyuki Kikuchi
- Translator: Eugene Woodbury
- Illustrator: Jun Suemi
- Country: Japan
- Language: Japanese
- Genre: Horror
- Publisher: Shodensha
- Published: 1986 - 2012
- Media type: Print (Paperback)

Demon City Blues (Japanese: 魔界都市ブルース, Hepburn: Makai Toshi Burusu) is a Japanese novel series written by Hideyuki Kikuchi and illustrated by Jun Suemi. The story takes place in Demon City Shinjuku's universe and features common characters.

== Plot ==
As told in the events of Demon City Shinjuku, a devastating earthquake caused by supernatural forces left most of Japan in ruins, turning the Shinjuku district into a zone suspended between the mortal world and Hell. The district has become an isolated slum in which humans struggle to cohabit with monsters and demons every day. In this dark place, a young private investigator specialized in missing people, named Setsura Aki, gets routinely tasked with dangerous missions that pit him against the worst entities of the netherworld.

== Characters ==
Setsura Aki (秋せつら, Aki Setsura)
The protagonist of the story, the young, handsome owner of a senbei shop in West Shinjuku who moonlights as a private investigator. He specializes in missing person cases and is considered the best manhunter in the business, although he often finds himself forced to team up with Mephisto to solve his missions. Always clad a black longcoat, his signature weapon is the "devil wires" (妖糸, yokata), a string of 1 nanometer titanium wires which allows him to slice his enemies and perform multiple tasks in combat. He has two personalities, expressed distinctly as "boku" and "watashi", with the latter being much darker. His father, Renjo Aki, was a famous manhunter as well.

Mephisto (メフィスト, Mefisuto)
Known as a "Demon Doctor" (魔界医師, Makaiishi), Mephisto is a mysterious physician and private clinic director in the Shinjuku zone. He is an expert in a wide variety of disciplines, including medicine, chemistry, history, technology and magic, to the point that he is rumored to be able to give life back to the dead (an ability he denies to have). Very much as Setsura, he is skilled at fighting with metal wires, and also utilizes traps and special concoctions. He hates women, though it is revealed he loved a vampire woman.

Mephisto originally appeared in Demon City Shinjuku, and also has his own stand alone novel in Demon Doctor Mephisto.

Ryoko Sototani (外谷良子, Sototani Ryoko)
An obese information broker and shopkeeper. He often introduces Setsura to clients.

Galeen Nuvenberg (ヌーレンブルグ, Garen Nurenburugu)
An old witch from Czech Republic living in the Takadanobaba. She has influence over the community of wizards and occultists of Shinjuku, and is aided by a doll girl and an intelligent crow created by her. Although she is a major character for most of the series, she is murdered during the Demon Princess arc while protecting Setsura.

== Publication story ==
The series had its first installment published in 1986. It was divided in two blocks: the Nonnoberu short story collection and the longer Chohen arcs, both started the same year and finished in 2012. The latter's Demon Princess arc was published in English speaking countries by Digital Manga in 2009. Another episode of the series, Maohden, was published in 2012.

== List of chapters ==
- Nonnoberu
  1. Demon City Blues 1: Enchanting Beauty (魔界都市ブルース1 妖花の章, Makai Toshi Burūsu 1: Yōka no Shō) (April 1986, Shōdensha, ISBN 4-396-20206-7)
  2. Demon City Blues 2: Elegy (魔界都市ブルース2 哀歌の章, Makai Toshi Burūsu 2: Aika no Shō) (January 1989, Shōdensha, ISBN 4-396-20280-6)
  3. Demon City Blues 3: Shadow Blossom (魔界都市ブルース3 陰花の章, Makai Toshi Burūsu 3: Inka no Shō) (July 1992, Shōdensha, ISBN 4-396-20396-9)
  4. Demon City Blues 4: Firefly Glow (魔界都市ブルース4 蛍火の章, Makai Toshi Burūsu 4: Keika no Shō) (February 1993, Shōdensha, ISBN 4-396-20418-3)
  5. Demon City Blues 5: Hidden Princess (魔界都市ブルース5 幽姫の章, Makai Toshi Burūsu 5: Bukaki no Shō) (July 1996, Shōdensha, ISBN 4-396-20560-0)
  6. Demon City Blues 6: A Child's Dream (魔界都市ブルース6 童夢の章, Makai Toshi Burūsu 6: Dōmu no Shō) (December 1998, Shōdensha, ISBN 4-396-20648-8)
  7. Demon City Blues 7: Bewitching Moon (魔界都市ブルース7 妖月の章, Makai Toshi Burūsu 7: Yōgetsu no Shō) (July 1999, Shōdensha, ISBN 4-396-20665-8)
  8. Demon City Blues 8: Lonely Figure (魔界都市ブルース8 孤影の章, Makai Toshi Burūsu 8: Koei no Shō) (September 2001, Shōdensha, ISBN 4-396-20722-0)
  9. Demon City Blues 9: Lamenting Demon (魔界都市ブルース9 愁鬼の章, Makai Toshi Burūsu 9: Shūki no Shō) (May 2004, Shōdensha, ISBN 4-396-20778-6)
  10. Demon City Blues 10: Illusory Dance (魔界都市ブルース10 幻舞の章, Makai Toshi Burūsu 10: Genbu no Shō) (February 2007, Shōdensha, ISBN 978-4-396-20829-5)
  11. Demon City Blues 11: Beloved Prison (魔界都市ブルース11 恋獄の章, Makai Toshi Burūsu 11: Rengoku no Shō) (September 2010, Shōdensha, ISBN 978-4-396-20879-0)
  12. Demon City Blues 12: Grieving Wail (魔界都市ブルース12 愁哭の章, Makai Toshi Burūsu 12: Shūkoku no Shō) (February 2012, Shōdensha, ISBN 978-4-396-20895-0)
- Chohen
  1. The Legend of the Devil King 1 (魔王伝1, Mao Den 1) (May 1986, Shōdensha, ISBN 4-396-32494-4)
  2. The Legend of the Devil King 2 (魔王伝1, Mao Den 2) (July 1986, Shōdensha, ISBN 4-396-32502-9)
  3. The Legend of the Devil King 3 (魔王伝1, Mao Den 3) (September 1987, Shōdensha, ISBN 4-396-32518-5)
  4. Shu Guan (双貌鬼, Shu Guan) (January 1988, Shōdensha,ISBN 4-396-20254-7)
  5. Demon Princess 1 (夜叉姫伝1, Yashakiden 1) (July 1989, Shōdensha, ISBN 4-396-20294-6)
  6. Demon Princess 2 (夜叉姫伝2, Yashakiden 2) (October 1989, Shōdensha, ISBN 4-396-20303-9)
  7. Demon Princess 3 (夜叉姫伝3, Yashakiden 3) (January 1990, Shōdensha, ISBN 4-396-20312-8)
  8. Demon Princess 4 (夜叉姫伝4, Yashakiden 4) (July 1990, Shōdensha, ISBN 4-396-20324-1)
  9. Demon Princess 5 (夜叉姫伝5, Yashakiden 5) (November 1990, Shōdensha, ISBN 4-396-20341-1)
  10. Demon Princess 6 (夜叉姫伝6, Yashakiden 6) (April 1991, Shōdensha, ISBN 4-396-20351-9)
  11. Demon Princess 7 (夜叉姫伝7, Yashakiden 7) (July 1991, Shōdensha, ISBN 4-396-20360-8)
  12. Demon Princess 8: Final Volume (夜叉姫伝8 完結編, Yashakiden 8: Kanketsuhen) (January 1992, Shōdensha, ISBN 4-396-20381-0)

== See also ==
- Demon City Shinjuku
- Hideyuki Kikuchi
