= Brittney Karbowski filmography =

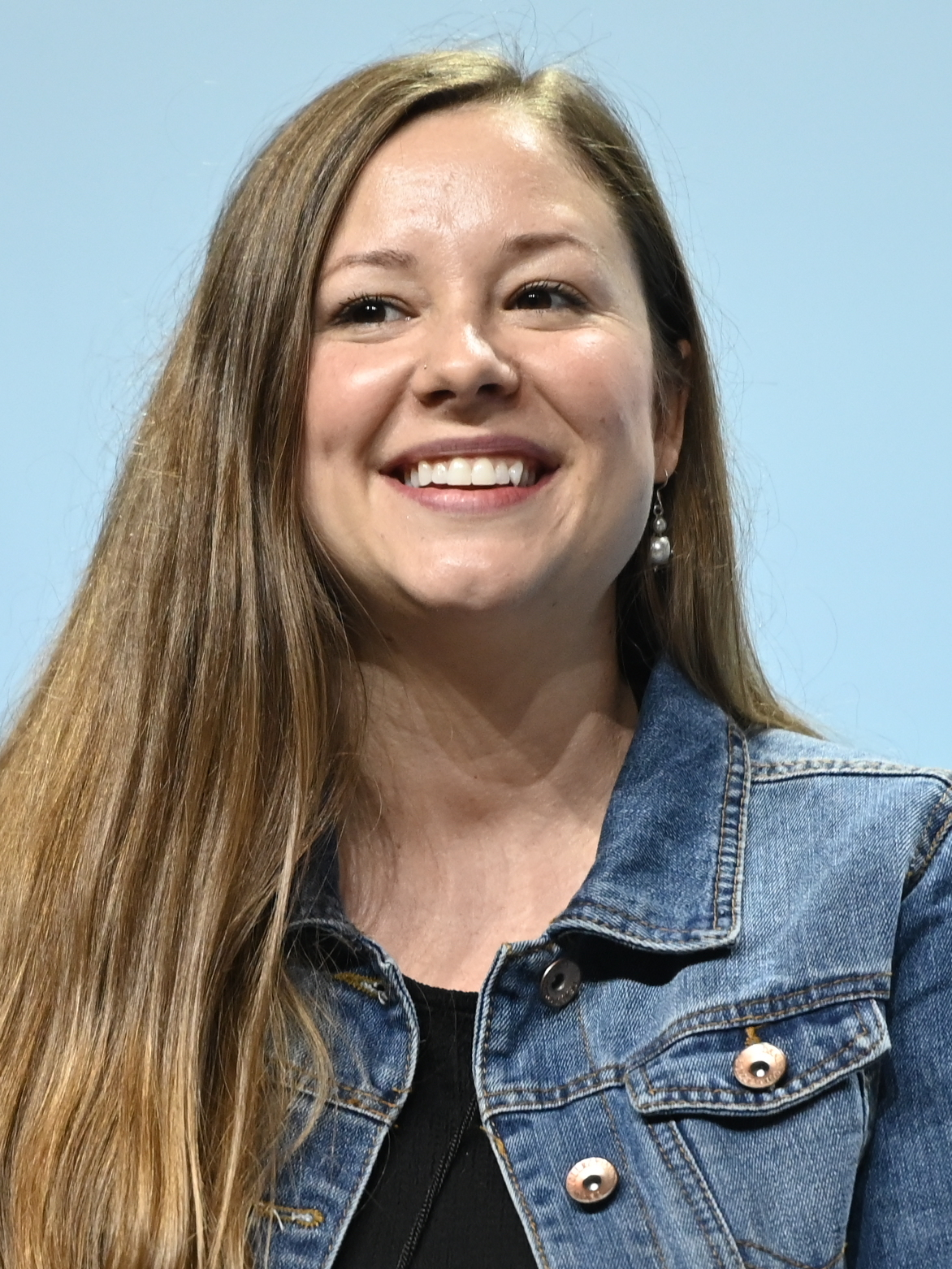
Brittney Karbowski at GalaxyCon in 2023.

Brittney Karbowski is an American voice actress who has appeared in numerous anime films, television series and video games.

Along with her voice over work since her debut in 2004, Karbowski is known for her roles as Mikoto Misaka in A Certain Magical Index, Rimuru Tempest in That Time I Got Reincarnated as a Slime, Black Star in Soul Eater, Sanae Dekomori in Love, Chunibyo & Other Delusions, Camie Utsushimi in My Hero Academia, Wendy Marvell in Fairy Tail and Nanachi in Made in Abyss. This list is exclusive to either main characters she has played, or minor characters with recurring roles.

== Anime ==
=== 2003–2010 ===
Year	Title	Role
2003–2005	Mermaid Melody Pichi Pichi Pitch	Hanon Hōshō
2004	Chrono Crusade	Sister Anna
2005	Madlax	Nakhl
2005	Gilgamesh	Fuko Omuro
2005	Yumeria	Mone
2006	Le Chevalier D'Eon	Anna Rochefort
2006	Jinki: Extend	Aoba Tsuzaki
2006	Pani Poni Dash!	Himeko Katagiri
2007	Air Gear	Reng Fa
2007	Coyote Ragtime Show	Franca
2007	Itsudatte My Santa!	Mai
2007	One Piece (Note: Funimation dub)	Apis, Going Merry
2007	Red Garden	Rose Sheedy
2007	Shin-Chan	Ryuuko
2008	Best Student Council	Mayura Ichikawa
2008	Claymore	Riful
2008	Darker than Black	Kiko Kayanuma
2008	Kanon (Note: The 2006 anime version of Kanon was licensed and dubbed in English by ADV Films in 2008, where Karbowski dubs her character.)	Ayu Tsukimiya
2008	Ouran High School Host Club	Hinako Tsuwabuki
2008	Sasami: Magical Girls Club	Anri Misugi
2008	Shattered Angels	Ku Shiratori
2008	Shuffle!	Sia
2008	Tokyo Majin	Kyoko "Anko" Tohno
2008	The Wallflower	Laseine
2009	Kiba	Roya
2009	Druuga no Tuo: Sword of uruk	Henaro
2009	Murder Princess	Milano
2009	Negima!?	Anya
2009	Save Me! Lollipop	Nina Yamada
2010	Clannad	Ryou Fujibayashi
2010	Master of Martial Hearts	Yu Daimonji
2010	Sekirei	Hikari
2010	Soul Eater	Black Star

=== 2011–2015 ===
Year	Title	Role
2011	Angel Beats!	Yuri Nakamura
2011	Blue Drop	Tsubael
2011	Chaos;Head	Nanami
2011	Fullmetal Alchemist: Brotherhood	Selim Bradley / Pride
2011	Heaven's Lost Property	Ikaros
2011	Highschool of the Dead	Alice Maresato
2011	Maken-ki!	Furan Takaki
2011	MM!	Noa Hiiragi
2011	Needless	Eve Neuschwanstein
2011	Night Raid 1931	Yukina Sonogi
2011	Phantom ~Requiem for the Phantom	Cal "Drei" Devens
2012	A Certain Magical Index	Mikoto Misaka, Last Order, Misaka sisters
2012	B Gata H Kei: Yamada's First Time	Yamada
2012	Btooom!	Himiko
2012	Campione!	Athena
2012	Ef: A Fairy Tale of the Two	Kei Shindou
2012	Fairy Tail	Wendy Marvell
2012	Freezing	Ingrid Bernstein
2012	Hakuoki	Chizuru Yukimura
2012	Infinite Stratos (Note: Karbowski dubbed her character which spanned 2 seasons, she also did the OVAs for Infinite Stratos)	Cecilia Alcott
2012	Is This a Zombie? (Note: Karbowski only dubbed her character in the second season and OVA)	Yuki "Tomonori" Yoshida
2012	Shakugan no Shana (Note: Karbowski dubbed Matake Ogata in season 2/3, and also portrayed her in the film and OVAs)	Matake Ogata
2012	The World God Only Knows (Note: Karbowski only dubbed her character in the second season)	Kanon Nakagawa, Chihiro Kosaka
2013	A Certain Scientific Railgun	Mikoto Misaka
2013	AKB0048	Orine Aida
2013	Another	Yukari Sakuragi
2013	Bodacious Space Pirates	Mami Endo
2013	Cat Planet Cuties	Manami Kinjou
2013	Dusk Maiden of Amnesia	Momoe Okonogi
2013	Hiiro no Kakera	Kiyono Takara
2013	Kokoro Connect	Rina Yaegeshi
2013	Maria Holic	Dorm Supervisor "God"
2013	Nakaimo – My Sister Is Among Them!	Miyabi Kannagi
2013	Phi Brain: Puzzle of God	Ana Gram
2013	Say I Love You	Nagi Kurosawa
2013	We Without Wings	Ai Kohda
2014	A Certain Scientific Railgun S	Mikoto Misaka, Misaka sisters
2014	The Ambition of Oda Nobuna	Takenake Hanbe
2014	Chaika - The Coffin Princess	Chaika Bohdan
2014	Attack on Titan	Hitch Dreyse
2014	Diabolik Lovers	Christa, Young Kou
2014	Fate/kaleid liner Prisma Illya	Mimi Katsura
2014	Jormungand series	Schokolade
2014	Problem Children Are Coming from Another World, Aren't They?	Kusakabe Yō
2014	Rozen Maiden Zurücksplen	Suiseiseki
2014	Tamako Market (Note: Also appears in the film Tamako Love Story.)	Anko Kitashirakawa
2014	Upotte!!	Ichiroku (M16A4)
2015	Beyond the Boundary	Ai Shindo
2015	Black Bullet	Yuzuki Katagiri
2015	Date A Live	Kaguya Yamai
2015	Leviathan: The Last Defense	Jormungandr
2015	Love, Chunibyo & Other Delusions	Sanae Dekomori
2015	Dog & Scissors	Maxi Akizuki
2015	Magical Warfare	Futaba Ida
2015	Muv-Luv Alternative: Total Eclipse	Inia Sestina
2015	Parasyte	Migi
2015	Akame Ga Kill	Aria
2015	Selector Infected WIXOSS	Piruluk

=== 2016–2020 ===
Year	Title	Role
2016	Cross Ange	Vivian
2016	Dennō Coil	Fumie Hashimoto
2016	Shimoneta	Otome Saotome
2016	Hanayamata	Sachiko Yamanoshita
2016	Wizard Barristers	Cecil Sudo
2016	Monster Hunter Stories: Ride On	Lute
2016	Trinity Seven	Selina Sherlock
2017	Valkyrie Drive	Meifon
2017	Alice & Zoroku	Asahi Hinagiri
2017	Amagi Brilliant Park	Shiina Chujo
2017	Chihayafuru	Nayuta Amakusu/Nene Hayasaka
2017	Classroom of the Elite	Chiaki Matsushita
2017	Food Wars!: Shokugeki no Soma	Hisako Arato
2017	Gamers!	Karen Tendō
2017	Gate	Lelei La Lalena
2017	KanColle	Sendai
2017	Monster Musume	Papi
2017	School-Live!	Yuki Takeya
2017	Space Patrol Luluco	Luluco
2017	Squid Girl	Kiyomi Sakura
2017	Ushio and Tora	Yu/Omamori/ Tokisaka/Lei Xia
2017	WorldEnd	Ithea-Myse-Valgulious
2017	Tanaka-Kun is Always Listless	Rino Tanaka
2018	Death March to the Parallel World Rhapsody	Pochi
2018	Angels of Death	Eddie
2018	Anonymous Noise	Young Yuzu
2018	Armed Girl's Machiavellism	Koharu Narukami
2018	Bloom Into You	Koyomi Kanou
2018	Doreiku	Machi Machiya
2018	Flip Flappers	Papika
2018	Haikyu!!	Hitoka Yachi
2018	My Hero Academia	Camie Utsushimi
2018	Hitorijime My Hero	Ryoko, Young Kensuke
2018	Land of the Lustrous	Zircon
2018	Made in Abyss	Nanachi
2018	Revue Starlight	Karen Aijo
2018	Scum's Wish	Noriko "Moka" Kamomebata
2018	The Seven Heavenly Virtues	Metatron
2018	UQ Holder!	Tota
2018–present	That Time I Got Reincarnated as a Slime	Rimuru Tempest
2019	A Certain Scientific Accelerator	Last Order, Misaka sisters
2019	Boogiepop and Others	Rika
2019	Ensemble Stars!	Hajime Shino
2019	Hakumei and Mikochi	Hakumei
2019	Just Because!	Ena Komiya
2019	Kämpfer	Akane Mishima
2019	Love Stage!!	Kasumi Shino/Gaga-Ruru
2019	Mitsuboshi Colors	Kotoha
2019	Waiting in the Summer	Remon Yamano
2019	Assassins Pride	Melida Angel
2019	Ahiru no Sora	Sora Kurumatani (young)
2019	To Love Ru	Mikan Yuuki
2019	O Maidens in Your Savage Season	Kazusa Onodera
2020	Sorcerous Stabber Orphen	Volkan
2020	BanG Dream!	Rokka Asahi
2020	Bofuri: I Don't Want to Get Hurt, so I'll Max Out My Defense	Kanade
2020	The Pet Girl of Sakurasou	Yūko Kanda
2020	Peter Grill and the Philosopher's Time	Mitchi
2020	Rifle Is Beautiful	Hikari Kokura
2020	Gleipnir	Claire Aoki

=== 2021–present ===
Year	Title	Role
2021	Kandagawa Jet Girls	Emily Orange
2021	Combatants Will Be Dispatched!	Grimm
2021	Mother of the Goddess' Dormitory	Koshi Nagumo
2021	Kakegurui (Note: Sentai Filmworks dub)	Runa Yomozuki
2021	Shikizakura	Kakeru Miwa (child)
2022	Tribe Nine	Saori Arisugawa
2022	Sabikui Bisco	Tirol Ōchagama
2022	The Executioner and Her Way of Life	Menou (young)
2022	Iroduku: The World in Colors	Asagi Kazeno
2022	The Slime Diaries: That Time I Got Reincarnated as a Slime	Rimuru Tempest
2022	The Greatest Demon Lord Is Reborn as a Typical Nobody	Lemming
2022	Black Summoner	Ange
2023	The Eminence in Shadow	Sherry Barnett
2023	Ningen Fushin: Adventurers Who Don't Believe in Humanity Will Save the World	Curran
2023	Mobile Suit Gundam: The Witch from Mercury	Chuatury
2023	Farming Life in Another World	Lees
2023	Management of a Novice Alchemist	Sarasa
2023	The Kingdoms of Ruin	Adonis (young)
2023	Love Flops	Amelia
2023	Shangri-La Frontier	Oikatzo/Kei Uomi
2023	Shy	Kufufu Kekerakera
2024	Tales of Wedding Rings	Saphir Maasa
2024	The Witch and the Beast	Helga Velvette
2024	The Vexations of a Shut-In Vampire Princess	Terakomari Gandesblood
2024	The Most Heretical Last Boss Queen	Tiara Royal Ivy
2024	Fairy Tail: 100 Years Quest	Wendy Marvell
2024	Chained Soldier	Ginna
2024	Level 1 Demon Lord and One Room Hero	Demon Lord
2024	I Parry Everything	Noor (young)
2024	Insomniacs After School	Kanikawa
2024	Dungeon People	Light Spirit
2025	Loner Life in Another World	Fukunuki
2025	Plus-Sized Elf	Kobo
2025	From Bureaucrat to Villainess: Dad's Been Reincarnated!	Josette, Orion
2025	I'm a Behemoth, an S-Ranked Monster, but Mistaken for a Cat, I Live as an Elf Girl's Pet	Vulcan
2025	Detective Conan	Mitsuhiko Tsuburaya (Note: Karbowski dubs the character in the English redub produced by Studio Nano.)
2025	Rock Is a Lady's Modesty	Aki
2025	Bad Girl	Rura Ruriha
2026	Kirio Fan Club	Seira Tashiro
2026	Yowayowa Sensei	Yūki Yukishita
2026–present	Marriagetoxin	Mei Kinosaki

== Film ==
List of voice performances in direct-to-video, feature and television films
Year	Title	Role
2011	Summer Wars	Yuhei Jinnouchi
2012	Gintama: The Movie	Tetsuko Murata, Kyubei Yagyu
2013	Colorful	Shoko Sano
2013	Fairy Tail the Movie: Phoenix Priestess	Wendy Marvell
2016	The Boy and the Beast	Jirōmaru (Young)
2017	Fairy Tail Movie 2: Dragon Cry	Wendy Marvell
2020	Made in Abyss: Dawn of the Deep Soul	Nanachi
2021	Gintama: The Very Final	Kyubei Yagyu
2021	The Island of Giant Insects	Ayumi Matsuoka

== Video games ==
List of voice performances in video games
Year	Title	Role
2017	Onigiri	Ibaraki-doji
2017	Akiba's Beat	Pinkun
2021	World's End Club	Chuko
2021	Tales of Luminaria	Charles
2023	Fire Emblem Engage	Citrinne
2024	Unicorn Overlord	Mercenaries (Type B), additional voices
2025	Goddess of Victory: Nikke	Bready

== Live-action roles ==
List of acting performances in film
Year	Title	Role
2011	Puncture	Susie
2013	The Starving Games	Backpack Girl
