= List of Jormungand episodes =

The DVD cover of Jormungand as released in Japan. Koko Hekmatyar and Jonathan "Jonah" Mar are featured on the cover.

Jormungand (ヨルムンガンド, Yorumungando) is a 2012 anime based on the manga by Keitaro Takahashi. The anime is produced by White Fox studios and directed by Keitaro Motonaga, produced by Gaku Iwasa, script by Yousuke Kuroda and music by Taku Iwasaki under the Jormungand Production Partners team. The series centers on Koko Hekmatyar, the only daughter of business tycoon Floyd Hekmatyar and the head of HCLI's Europe/African Weapons Transport Division. At the start of the series, she recruits Jonathan "Jonah" Mar, an experienced child soldier who had once fought in West Asia, as one of her bodyguards. The show then follows Koko's encounters and dealings with governments, private clients, rival arms dealers, and any and all sorts of the trouble she gets into in the course of her line of work as she sells weapons – from small arms, to military vehicles, to fighter aircraft upgrade kits. Because of the hazards involved, Koko relies on Jonah and her other bodyguards to ensure her safety.

The anime began airing on April 10, 2012, on Tokyo MX, Television Kanagawa, TV Aichi and KBS and on later dates on Sun TV, BS11 and AT-X. The show will also be seen online in Showtime, NicoNico, Bandai Channel and GyaO. A second season of the series, Jormungand: Perfect Order, was also announced and slated to be released in October 2012, which began broadcasting on Japanese TV on October 9, 2012. The two seasons aired on Japanese TV at 12:30 AM.

Funimation has licensed the series for the North American market with the French market under the license of Dybex. A sneak preview of the anime was held on March 31 to April 1, 2012, at the Anime Contents Expo at the Makuhari Messe in Chiba.

The first release of Jormungand on DVD and Blu-ray was officially released by Geneon Universal in Japan on June 27, 2012, with the first two episodes, "Gun Metal, Calico Road" and "Pulsar" included. Subsequent releases followed with two episodes each on both Blu-rays and DVDs on July 25, August 29 and September 26 of 2012. The Perfect Order DVD/Blu-rays was first released in Japan on December 21, 2012.

Both the opening and ending theme songs for the first season were produced by I've Sound. The opening song is "Borderland" by Mami Kawada, and the ending theme is "Ambivalentidea" by Nagi Yanagi. Both songs will be released as singles by the record label Geneon Universal Entertainment.

For the second season, the opening is "UNDER/SHAFT" by Maon Kurosaki, while the ending is "Laterality" by Nagi Yanagi. On the seven episode of the second season, "UNDER/SHAFT" was used at the ending song.

== Episode list ==
=== Jormungand ===
No.	Title	Original release date
1	"Gunmetal Calico Road"; Transliteration: "Gan metaru Kyariko Rōdo" (Japanese: ガンメタル・キャリコロード)	April 10, 2012 (Note: Tokyo MX, TV Kanagawa, TV Aichi and KBS were the first TV stations to air the episode on April 10, 2012. Sun TV and BS11 aired the episode on April 11, 2012 and AT-X being the last station to air the episode on April 13, 2012.)
Koko Hekmatyar personally recruits Jonathan "Jonah" Mar before they travel en route to Eastern Europe, where a local government official has kept a shipment of HCLI MiG-29 fighter upgrades under lockdown from his country's air force for fear it would lead to regional tension with its neighbors. Jonah protects Koko from the government's elite Voshkod 6 unit, with Sofia "Valmet" Velmer and Lehm Brick backing them up, as Koko heads to the harbor to secure the MiG-29 upgrades which forces the official to give up. Later, Koko is informed by HCLI that a rival arms dealer named Kloshkin is trying to sell Hind-D's to the air force. Koko and Jonah, pretending to be the former's younger brother, visits Kloshkin to dissuade him. In truth, the meeting is a diversion to allow Valmet and Akihiko Tojo to convince the air force to cancel Kloshkin's deal while Lehm, Mao, Ugo and Lutz kill the snipers protecting him. As Kloshkin realizes too late that he has been fooled, Koko orders Jonah to kill him. Koko celebrates with her bodyguards over dinner where they welcome Jonah into their group. However, everyone except Jonah gets sick after eating his scrambled eggs.
2	"Pulsar"; Transliteration: "Parusā" (Japanese: パルサー)	April 17, 2012
Koko and her team are en route to deliver weapons to a country south of Russia, but discover that the nation's forces led by Major Pollack and the Russians are fighting over the country's oil pipeline. Koko is dismayed when Curry and his team from CCAT, Koko's rival weapons dealer, swing by as well. Koko wants to get out of the country as soon as possible since she does not deal with clients who pay on credit. However, Pollack wants her to deliver antiaircraft weaponry for his army, and he will not take no for an answer. Left with no other choice, she agrees but secretly tells her bodyguards they will rendezvous with Tojo and Valmet and escape through the border. Koko is forced to work with Curry after his bodyguards Mildo and Lu kill Pollack's escorts. When Pollack's mountain infantry unit surrounds everyone in the building they are hiding, Koko and her team decides to face the unit, but she betrays Curry by telling the unit that the people who murdered Pollack's escorts are inside the building before the group flees. Despite Koko's escape, Pollack manages to build a fake SAM truck to fool the Russian military thanks to Koko's delivery. Two days later, Koko and Curry, and their respective teams, manage to flee the country, where Koko watches a news report at the airport of the war having a quick conclusion just as she predicted.
3	"Musica ex Machina phase.1" Transliteration: "Mujika Ekusu Makīna phase.1" (Japanese: ムジカ・エクス・マキーナ phase.1)	April 24, 2012
In Dubai, Koko tells Tojo to give Jonah a math lesson and then decides to go out shopping with Valmet. However, the assassin group Orchestra, composed of teenage girl Chinatsu and her mentor Maestro, are hired to assassinate Koko. Jonah, who skips Tojo's lesson, saves Koko and Valmet from Orchestra. As a gunfight ensues in downtown Dubai, Jonah and Valmet protect Koko from Orchestra, while the latter easily kills Dubai Police Force officers responding to the shootout. Valmet is shot in the leg, to which Jonah responds by engaging Maestro in an open gunfire confrontation in order for Valmet to escape with Koko. However, Lehm drags Jonah back using a hook and rope, chastising the boy for needlessly sacrificing his life. While Jonah escapes with Koko, Lehm holds off Orchestra, who soon runs out of ammo and retreat to their pickup truck armed with an M2 Browning machine gun. Lehm and Valmet, who conclude that Chinatsu has great observation skills and natural instincts and is able to control the wild Maestro, rendezvous with the rest of the team and try to separate the duo before they reach Koko. Meanwhile, Jonah tells Koko how he thinks guns make people into monsters, and she thanks him for opening up to her.
4	"Musica ex Machina phase.2" Transliteration: "Mujika Ekusu Makīna phase.2" (Japanese: ムジカ・エクス・マキーナ phase.2)	May 1, 2012
A flashback reveals that Chinatsu was a survivor of a killing spree at an opera caused by Maestro, who was impressed when she shot him from behind. Back in the present, Koko's bodyguards continue to protect Koko and Jonah when Orchestra performs a drive-by using the M2 Browning machine gun in their pickup truck. The team manages to destroy the truck, forcing Chinatsu and Maestro out into the open, where Lutz snipes down Maestro after he refuses to heed Chinatsu's warning. Chinatsu vows revenge against Koko before she escapes. Meanwhile, a CIA agent named Scarecrow, who has been hunting down Koko for weapons dealing, tries to have her arrested and deported, but due to her father's connections, the Dubai Police Force instead releases Koko and covers up the shootout. The chief of police tells Koko that she and her team are to be confined to their hotel for the time being. As she and Jonah return to their hotel, they have an in-depth discussion about arms dealing. Three days later, Koko catches Chinatsu trying to infiltrate into the hotel. During their conversation, Koko offers Chinatsu to join her team, but Chinatsu refuses and tries to kill Koko. However, Chinatsu is shot to death by Lehm with his sniper rifle from a distance. As Koko closes the eyes of the dead girl, Koko calls the chief of police to cover up Chinatsu's death, while a hidden Jonah is listening.
5	"Vein"; Transliteration: "Jōmyaku" (Japanese: 静脈)	May 8, 2012
While on a HCLI-owned cargo ship en route to Africa from Dubai, Jonah watches Lutz and Renato "R" Socci test fire a XM8 rifle when Koko is informed that her older brother Kasper Hekmatyar will be arriving to see her from another HCLI-owned cargo ship. When William "Wilee" Nelson is instructed to take Jonah away by teaching him a grammar lesson, the latter heads to the restroom to relieve himself. However, Kasper heads to the restroom as well where Jonah attempts to kill him, but Kasper's bodyguard Chequita stops Jonah and disarms him. Three months ago in Western Asia, Jonah was a child soldier in an infantry base where he took care of four orphans. He later learned that Malka, one of the orphans, died being used as a human probe to clear a path filled with land mines, sending him on a rampage and killing everyone in the base, including an arms dealer named Yusuf Gasud. Jonah is soon surrounded and disarmed by Chequita, and Kasper later told Jonah that Malka was sacrificed to build a road for profitable reasons. Jonah was then locked up in an empty cargo container for days. In the present, Koko makes Kasper leave her ship after hearing about what happened in the restroom, having to apologize to Jonah for this. A few days later, Jonah wanders to the crow's nest of the ship, recalling that Kasper, who was responsible for selling weapons that killed Jonah's parents, promised to send the orphans to Japan to live peaceful lives in exchange that Jonah would become one of Koko's bodyguards in Europe.
6	"African Golden Butterflies phase.1" Transliteration: "Afurikan Gōruden Batafuraizu phase.1" (Japanese: アフリカン・ゴールデン・バタフライズ phase.1)	May 15, 2012
Koko and her team are en route to South Africa when they are ambushed by Somali pirates. After her bodyguards defeat them, Koko heads to DIESA, a local arms fair, to meet with Dr. Minami "Miami" Amada, who does not show up. Koko learns from Dr. Miami's assistant Malin that Dr. Miami and her bodyguard Mokoena have gone off to the mountains to find butterflies. Later, Koko meets with Guoming Chen, the head of the Daxinghai Company, and accepts his invitation to dinner, with Ugo accompanying her. Meanwhile, the rest of Koko's bodyguards head to the mountains to locate and protect Dr. Miami and Mokoena. On the other hand, Karen Low of the Daxinghai Company is covertly deployed to the mountains with a small team of Daxinghai contractors to abduct Dr. Miami due to her extensive knowledge of robotics. Jonah starts the battle when he ruins the ambush of the Daxinghai faction by randomly firing his assault rifle, causing a Daxinghai contractor to panic and return fire. This gives Koko's bodyguards the advantage over Karen's group. When Karen executes her subordinate for panicking, Valmet recognizes her combat stance and weapons of choice and has a flashback of the time when she was still a UN peacekeeper.
7	"African Golden Butterflies phase.2" Transliteration: "Afurikan Gōruden Batafuraizu phase.2" (Japanese: アフリカン・ゴールデン・バタフライズ phase.2)	May 22, 2012
While Ugo watches Koko and Chen having dinner in Port Elizabeth, Valmet engages Karen in close quarters combat with Jonah and Lehm taking on the surviving Daxinghai contractors. Valmet eventually gains the upper hand, seeing Karen as a reminder of herself when she had been severely wounded in Africa as a UN peacekeeper. Lehm intervenes to stop Valmet from further harming Karen. Eventually, Koko's bodyguards secure Dr. Miami and Mokoena, who are found in a field in the mountains full of butterflies. Furious that his Daxinghai contractors were defeated by Koko's bodyguards, Chen orders the assassination of Koko and Ugo in Port Elizabeth but Scarecrow's assistant Schokolade manages to persuade her boss to help them escape on a SuperHind Mk.V helicopter after Koko talked to her. Koko is dismayed the next day when Malin informs her that Dr. Miami and Mokoena went out to scavenge shellfish at a beach. Koko and her bodyguards eventually arrives at Heathrow airport in London, but not before having a minor problem with an airport security metal detector when Jonah insist to the guard that he had been shot in the butt a long time ago.
8	"Mondo Grosso"; Transliteration: "Mondo Gurosso" (Japanese: モンド・グロッソ)	May 29, 2012
Jonah easily beats Lutz in a game of paintball. With tension rising between Middle Eastern Country A and European Country B, Koko attends Country B's Embassy in London, where a contract bid is being held to decide which UAVs their country's military will buy, either HCLI's American Predators or Euro Group's French Neurons. However, Amalia Torohovsky, a former actress and arms dealer for Euro Group, gets a head start on Koko when she manages to convince almost all of Country B's delegates to side with Euro Group. Furious, Koko later meets with Schokolade and ask her to deliver some documents to her friends in the German military. With Koko doing nothing for two days, Amalia and Euro Group, who have tapped Koko's phone and computer, believe they have won until they learn news that both the German and Spanish military have decided to buy HCLI's Predators, which convinces Country B to follow suit. Meanwhile, Koko has formed a front company that is purchasing Euro Group stocks as part of a hostile takeover. Realizing Koko has played them, Amalia has a secret meeting with her, unaware that Euro Group mercenary snipers have followed them and are planning to kill Koko. After talking about the similarities and differences between them, Amalia concedes defeat over the contract bid while Koko agrees to sell back Euro Group stocks to her at a five percent premium, but not before Valmet, Lutz and Wilee non-lethally neutralize the mercenary snipers.
9	"Dragon Shooter phase.1" Transliteration: "Doragon Shūtā phase.1" (Japanese: ドラゴン・シューター phase.1)	June 5, 2012
The team has some rest and recuperation at the beach near the Adriatic Sea. Later during a science lesson, Mao shares with Jonah that he is married with children, and he was discharged from his artillery unit before being hired as one of Koko's bodyguards, something his children does not know. HCLI assigns Koko and her bodyguards to deliver artillery to the T Republic army at the Balkans. Much to her annoyance, she is also tasked to sneak in ten doctors from the humanitarian organization, Outspoken Doctors for Humanity, led by Leon Riviere. He wants to treat the country's ethnic cleansing victims and expose the crimes of warlord Dragan "Baldra" Nikolaevich, leader of the Balkan Dragons militia, who has a strong influence over the nation's army due to his connections. The team's An-12 cargo airplane arrives at their location and delivers the artillery to the army without problems. However, Baldra and his militia arrive, tipped off about the doctors and demands Koko to give them up. Koko refuses, leading to a standoff between the two sides. Hoping to settle things peacefully, Riviere comes out and tries to talk to Baldra. But Baldra shoots Riviere and tries to kill him until Lehm disarms Baldra. Left with no choice, Koko orders her team to kill the Balkan Dragons at Planina Airport.
10	"Dragon Shooter phase.2" Transliteration: "Doragon Shūtā phase.2" (Japanese: ドラゴン・シューター phase.2)	June 12, 2012
Koko's team eliminates the Balkan Dragons except Baldra who escapes and takes Riviere hostage. Knowing Baldra's militia will try to shoot them down once they leave the airport, Koko takes Mao's advice to take one of the artillery cannons into their plane. Once their plane leaves, the team manages to evade the militia's anti-air weaponry and destroy them thanks to Mao shooting them with a flechette round. Koko calls and makes a deal with Scarecrow and Schokolade that they get to capture Baldra in exchange for his $5 million bounty. She also realizes this was part of her father's plan to win favor with the Outspoken Doctors for Humanity and the CIA. After safely delivering the rest of the doctors to their destination near a refugee camp, Koko sends Lehm, Mao and Wilee to ambush Baldra's convoy, rescuing Riviere, capturing Baldra and giving his location to Scarecrow and Schokolade, who sends a US Marine SOR commando team to get him. With their job done, Koko's team flies out of the country.
11	"Hill of Doom phase.1" Transliteration: "Horobi no Oka phase.1" (Japanese: 滅びの丘 phase.1)	June 19, 2012
Koko's team prepare for their next deal with some members of the Italian Mafia in Alexandria, but Valmet leaves, wishing to take revenge on the man who gouged her right eye and killed her subordinates when she was an UN peacekeeper in Africa. After Schokolade reveals to her that Chen is this man, Valmet leaves the group unnoticed to confront Chen at his headquarters in North Africa, only to later learn that Jonah tailed her under Koko's orders. Meanwhile, Dominique, the leader of his crew of assassins, expresses to his companions Liliane and Grégoire his plan to leave the contract killing business and open a restaurant. Both agree with the idea, but first they must take one last job assigned to them, which is to assassinate Koko. While Valmet and Jonah get close to the Daxinghai Company base, the assassins decide to take down the members of Koko's team one by one starting with Ugo, whom they label as the easiest target among them. Schokolade informs Koko that Chen was crippled after stepping on a land mine in the past, which explains why he prematurely aged. Later on, Koko's deal with the mafia ends with her clients killed after they tried to pay her with cocaine. Dominique's crew take advantage of Valmet and Jonah's absence to start their plan by having Liliane distracting the others while Grégoire knocks out Lehm and is about to decapitate Ugo.
12	"Hill of Doom phase.2" Transliteration: "Horobi no Oka phase.2" (Japanese: 滅びの丘 phase.2)	June 26, 2012
Ugo manages to hold off Grégoire long enough for Lehm to knock him out. Koko and her bodyguards manages to subdue Dominique's crew and agrees to let them go if they reveal who hired them. Back in North Africa, Valmet drugs Jonah and heads towards the Daxinghai Company base alone. As she kills the Daxinghai contractors protecting the base, she is saved from a sniper by Jonah, who manages to fight off the effects of the drug. Valmet finally confronts Chen, where they share some words before she kills him, finally avenging the deaths of her subordinates. But as Valmet and Jonah returns to Koko, a vengeful Karen shoots Valmet, who shields Jonah before Jonah guns down Karen. After waking up from the hospital several days later, Valmet learns Karen survived as well but mysteriously disappeared. Koko comforts Valmet by telling her that she was able to put the souls of her subordinates at ease. As they take a walk together, Koko talks to Jonah about the attempted hit on her and the team. Meanwhile, George "Bookman" Black, the CIA Chief of the European Division, flies to Paris from Langley to meet up with his contact, who is none other than R.

=== Jormungand: Perfect Order ===
No.	Title	Original release date
13	"The Snake that Admires the Heavens"; Transliteration: "Ten o Aogu Hebi" (Japanese: 天を仰ぐ蛇)	October 9, 2012
In Port Elizabeth, Dr. Minami "Miami" Amada has an encounter with Karen Low, and by learning that she is unemployed, she decides to hire her as a bodyguard. Some time later, the duo has a meeting with Koko Hekmatyar and her bodyguards at the Solomon Islands to oversee the launch of the final item of HCLI's satellite network designed to give the company and their affiliated arms dealers an upper hand against their opponents. On a later occasion, Renato "R" Socci has a meeting with George "Bookman" Black and informs him that Koko knows that Dominique's crew was hired by the CIA. Black claims that it was not his doing, as his true intention is to make Koko a tool at the behest of the U.S. as part of his plan called "Operation Undershaft", which involves R's undercover assignment. Meanwhile, Hex, the CIA Special Activities Division operative behind the assassination attempt in Alexandria, seduces a fellow CIA agent named Spin into giving her the details about Operation Undershaft. Hex plans to find out what hurts Koko the most before destroying it.
14	"Dance with Undershaft phase.1" Transliteration: "Andāshafuto to Dansu phase.1" (Japanese: アンダーシャフト・とダンス phase.1)	October 16, 2012
In the past, R met Black in the 1990s with the Balkans under UN intervention before working with him to infiltrate HCLI after the two worked together to hunt down war criminals. Furthermore, Hex was discharged from the disbanded Wide Range Communications Platoon and recruited to the Special Operations Group of the SAD, leading black ops missions against arms dealers, including Echo, one of Koko's subordinates. In the present, Koko has a private meeting with Amalia Torohovsky about Black and his quest to put arms dealers under his thumb for the CIA. Koko later gives her team new weapons to replace their personal weapons while conducting VIP protection exercises. Koko asks R about Black, which R tries to tell Koko a little bit of the truth to hide his cover. R tries to contact Black in order to persuade him to remove Hex from the operation since Jonathan "Jonah" Mar is confirmed to be her next target. However, Black wants to keep Hex under his control, even if that means having to sacrifice Jonah in the process.
15	"Dance with Undershaft phase.2" Transliteration: "Andāshafuto to Dansu phase.2" (Japanese: アンダーシャフト・とダンス phase.2)	October 23, 2012
R convinces Black to tell him the location of Hex and her SOG team and rushes to help Koko and Jonah, finding them already under attack from them. After revealing to Koko that he is a spy under Black, he manages to have both evacuate to safety and confronts Hex head on. When the two exchange shots, R and Hex manage to hit each other's left eyes, with R's wound being fatal. After the rest of Koko's team reaches the scene and takes down the snipers giving support to Hex, she is forced to give the order to retreat. Upon learning of R's death, an enraged Koko contacts the HCLI and demands them to track down Hex's location. Some time later, Hex and her two remaining men, sheltered in a cave in Northern Iraq, see a B-52 bomber sent by Koko that carpet bombs the area. R is buried on a scenic view near the coast, and Black appears to pay his respects, having a short meeting with Koko and her team in the occasion. Just after leaving, Black learns of Hex's apparent suicide and decides not to give up on Koko, after being reminded by the voices of R and Hex, who warn him not to underestimate Koko.
16	"Kasper and Jonah"; Transliteration: "Kyasupā to Yona" (Japanese: キャスパーとヨナ)	October 30, 2012
In Jakarta, Kasper Hekmatyar and his team find themselves once again outsmarted by a rival Japanese company, and he decides to take the fight to them with Koko's help. While Koko and her party travel to Japan, Jonah recalls the events that led to him being recruited as one of Koko's bodyguards. Meanwhile, Kasper sends a message to the Japanese company by having some of their men killed. When Koko makes the rendezvous with her brother in Japan, Jonah asks Kasper to show him how the three children he asked to give shelter are doing. Kasper brings Jonah to the dormitory where the three are living, but Jonah decides to not meet them, being satisfied for just knowing they are doing well. As the Japanese company learns about the death of their comrades, Kasper questions Akihiko Tojo about Colonel Yosuke Hinoki, an officer of the Japanese Ground Self-Defense Forces who commanded the Special Research Unit of the Defense Intelligence Headquarters, since Tojo was formerly one of Hinoki's subordinate.
17	"Castle of Lies phase.1" Transliteration: "Uso no Shiro phase.1" (Japanese: 嘘の城 phase.1)	November 6, 2012
As Kasper returns to Jakarta, Tojo debriefs his comrades at the Narita International Airport and informs them that the SR Unit is responsible for harassing Kasper's operations in Southeast Asia. He also informs them that the unit was created due to American requests during the Vietnam War, which evolved into a dummy corporation named Ganville Trading. Hinoki informs Koko of a rendezvous point for the two parties to meet with the pretense of discussing a mutual agreement, but Koko warns her team to prepare themselves for the worst. In Jakarta, Kasper meets with one of Ganville Trading's employees named Kurosaka, who takes the opportunity to attempt to kill him, but she is stopped and killed by Chequita. Now knowing that the enemy set a trap to them, Kasper and his squad make their way to evacuate, confronting the SR Unit commandos along the way.
18	"Castle of Lies phase.2" Transliteration: "Uso no Shiro phase.2" (Japanese: 嘘の城 phase.2)	November 13, 2012
Jonah escapes death after informing Koko that the supposed rendezvous point was empty at Tokyo Bay Aqua Line's Umihotaru, avoiding an ambush after Tojo finds him. Koko and the others were able to get away, managing to defeat the remaining SR Unit operatives. When Jonah, Koko and Tojo meet with Hinoki at the Bahamas, Hinoki tells Tojo that he allowed the remaining SR Unit operatives to take on HCLI because he noted that they needed to fight one good battle against Koko and Kasper. Hinoki also explained that the unit was becoming arms dealers themselves, something that he did not wish to happen as circumstances gave him no choice but to let the unit destroy itself as they lost its true purpose, which was to be a black ops unit of the DIH. In a flashback, Tojo remembers leaving the SR Unit because the unit was turning its back on its Cuban agents during a black operation, which made Tojo resign after returning to Jakarta. This eventually led to his recruitment to HCLI under Kasper before he joined up with Koko.
19	"Pazuzu"; Transliteration: "Pazuzu" (Japanese: パズズ)	November 20, 2012
While Koko's team drives a convoy through Iraq, Jonah hears the story of how William "Wilee" Nelson met Lehm Brick and the Delta Force in Iraq during the first Gulf War before he got hired by Koko. The members of the private military company named Excalibur are fired by Koko for shooting a passing vehicle without even checking if it was a threat or not, but their interpreter Nazal offers himself to accompany them on their Iraqi trip. Wilee makes use of his demolitions expertise to figure out a trap set by Excalibur and the team successfully repels their pincer attack and defeat the enemy with the help of Nazal, who was supposedly working with them but switched sides, collaborating with Koko instead.
20	"NEW WORLD phase.1" Transliteration: "Nyū Wārudo phase.1" (Japanese: ニュー・ワールド phase.1)	November 27, 2012
Koko's team has a meeting in England with Dr. Miami to debut the grand opening of a toy factory in South Africa, which brings up the attention of Schokolade, who contacts Jerry "Scarecrow" Schatzberg to inform Black about it. While Dr. Miami takes Jonah and Karen for a butterfly hunt, Jonah fails to get Dr. Miami to tell him what she and Koko are truly planning. As she bids farewell to Dr. Miami, Koko agrees with her idea to give a name to their plan which from then on is called "Jormungand". Later, Curry has dinner with Dr. Miami to discuss having CCAT play a role in this new developing enterprise, but Dr. Miami refuses the offer and has Curry consider quitting the arms dealing business and opening up a restaurant. Some time later, Amalia visits Koko, hoping to collaborate with her, and displays the newest UAV technology recently obtained. Kasper makes an announcement in the Philippines of HCLI's satellite network, the "Hekmatyar-Global Grid" (or simply "Hek-GG"). According to Kasper, it will help their clients around the world to greatly improve their military logistics. Black and Hinoki react coldly to the announcement, and Jonah realizes that Koko has no interest in this at all when she briefly discusses it with Amalia. Jonah ponders that despite having traveled with her for so much time, he has not yet realized her true character.
21	"NEW WORLD phase.2" Transliteration: "Nyū Wārudo phase.2" (Japanese: ニュー・ワールド phase.2)	December 4, 2012
In the Caucasus, quantum optics expert Elena Baburin is kidnapped by Koko's bodyguards and brought before her. Meanwhile, Scarecrow is informed that Koko has been secretly pooling all her resources in the toy factory in South Africa, a move she is concealing even from HCLI. After closing some deals around the world, Koko and her team is approached by Hinoki and Black at the Dulles Airport to remind her that she is being watched. When Schokolade informs Scarecrow that she had lost track of Koko, Black realizes that Koko's next move is to extract Leila Ibrahim Faiza (aka "Chatty" Rabbit's Foot), a quantum physicist, hacker and online activist from the Guantanamo Bay detention camp. According to the intel about their recent activities, Koko and Dr. Miami's secret project involves building a quantum supercomputer, something Leila will be needed to help complete. Meanwhile, as Koko's team is preparing themselves for the kidnapping, Lutz questions Koko about her true intentions. Although she refrains from answering, all her bodyguards including Lutz reaffirm their commitment to her. In the National Security Agency Headquarters, Officer Torrey Plame discusses the planned kidnapping with Hinoki, informing him that Leila will be transferred to another detention facility with the U.S. Navy SEAL Platoon "Night Nine" on standby, ready to kill whoever tries to rescue her.
22	"NEW WORLD phase.3" Transliteration: "Nyū Wārudo phase.3" (Japanese: ニュー・ワールド phase.3)	December 11, 2012
After successfully managing to kidnap Leila and flee to the woods near the Cuban border, Koko's team find themselves in a pinch against the Night Nine, who is dispatched after them, until Koko manages to shoot down their surveillance UAV. She make use of her new system to hack into the U.S. military to feed their enemies with false info which guides them near a Cuban base, providing an opening for her comrades to escape. While traveling in a freight to South Africa to rendezvous with Dr. Miami and Elena, Koko convinces Leila to work for her and upon arriving there, and she finally reveals to Jonah and the others the true nature of her plan. According to Koko, the quantum supercomputer and HCLI's satellite network together form the Jormungand system, which she will use to take control of the world to prevent further wars. She also confirms that her next step is to make use of Jormungand to impose a worldwide aerial blockade, disabling all civilian and military aircraft along with all air weaponry. However, after Koko reveals that all airplanes in midair will inevitably crash when that happens, causing hundreds of thousands of deaths, a desperate Jonah draws his gun in an attempt to dissuade her.
23	"Warmonger"; Transliteration: "Wōmongā" (Japanese: ウォーモンガー)	December 18, 2012
Claiming that her plan is already past the point of no return even if he kills her, Koko convinces Jonah to put down his gun, but because he cannot decide whether or not to join her, he flees away instead. Jonah, who is later found by Kasper, asks him for a place in his team. Black is contacted by Koko, who asks him to meet her in North Africa, but he is ambushed by a local Islamic extremist group just as he arrives there. He is rescued by the U.S. Marine Corps in the nick of time, realizing that it was all orchestrated by Koko, so she can demonstrate the true range of her newfound power. The police department arrests Plame for being the reason behind the ambush, although this also was set up by Koko. As Jonah travels around the world with Kasper and Chequita, now as part of their squad, he wonders about what to do next.
24	"Century of Shame"; Transliteration: "Haji no Seiki" (Japanese: 恥の世紀)	December 25, 2012
Two years have passed and wars have spread throughout the world, all predicted by Koko, who still has not activated Jormungand just yet. Already aware of her plans and instead of stopping her, Kasper agrees to protect Koko as she launches into orbit a compact version of the quantum supercomputer at a cosmodrome in a restored Soviet Union, putting it out of reach from her enemies. Just as he is departing with his team, Kasper permits Jonah to leave the team. Kasper claims that he will keep his part of the bargain of protecting Jonah's friends in Japan, while giving Jonah a passport and a Swiss Bank account as a parting gift. Four days later, Jonah wanders through Azerbaijan, where he is found by Koko and her team. Having welcomed Jonah back into her party, Koko activates Jormungand.
