= Anastasia Muñoz =

American voice actress

- Other names: Staci Moon; Tasia Moon
- Education: University of Alabama
- Occupation: Actress
- Years active: 2009–present
- Spouse: Seth Magill (m. 2018)
- Children: 2

Anastasia Muñoz is an American actress. She has provided voices for a number of English-language versions of Japanese anime films and television series. Her major characters include Tobias in .hack//Quantum, Koko Hekmatyar in Jormungand, Shiena Kenmochi in Riddle Story of Devil, Aria in The Sacred Blacksmith, and Minna-Dietlinde Wilcke in Strike Witches.

== Filmography ==
=== Anime ===
List of voice performances in anime
Year	Title	Role	Notes	Source
2009	Baccano!	Jacuzzi Splot (child)		
2009	Save Me! Lollipop	Forte (young)		
2010	Fullmetal Alchemist: Brotherhood	Gracia Hughes		
2010–present	Strike Witches series	Minna-Dietlinde Wilcke		
2010	Summer Wars	Yukiko Shinohara		
2010	The Sacred Blacksmith	Aria		
2011–2013	Baka and Test series	Hiromi Nakabayashi		
2011	Boku wa Tomodachi ga Sukunai	Asada		
2011	Ga-Rei: Zero	Ayame Jinguji		
2011	Rosario + Vampire	Keito	Ep. 11	
2012	Cat Planet Cuties	Qoone	credited as Staci Moon	
2012	.hack//Quantum	Tobias		
2012	Fafner in the Azure: Heaven and Earth	Jeremy Lee Marcy		
2012	Freezing	Aika Takeuchi	credited as Staci Moon	
2012	Sekirei: Pure Engagement	Ichiya		
2012	Shangri-La	Sayoko		
2012	King of Thorn	Laura Owen		
2012	Okami-san and Her Seven Companions	Nanako Shirayuki	Eps. 9–10	
2013	Last Exile: Fam, the Silver Wing	Sophia Forrester, Fritz (child)		
2013	A Certain Scientific Railgun	Harumi Kiyama		
2013	Aesthetica of a Rogue Hero	Loutier Trum		
2013	High School DxD	Karawarner, others		
2013	Michiko & Hatchin	Anastacia, Satoshi Batista (young)		
2014–present	Date A Live series	Tamae Okamine		
2014	Jormungand series	Koko Hekmatyar		
2014	Kamisama Kiss	Kamehime (Dragon King's Wife)	Ep. 9	
2014	Karneval	Miné	Ep. 1	
2014	Hetalia: The Beautiful World	Female Prussia (Nyotalia), Main Protagonist's Wife		
2015	Death Parade	Quin		
2015	Assassination Classroom	Mary Anne Cooper	Ep. 10	
2015	Ben-To	Kyo Sawagi		
2015	Nobunagun	Mary	Ep. 13	
2015–present	One Piece	Cosmos, Stussy (young), Époni		
2015	Riddle Story of Devil	Shiena Kenmochi		
2015–2016	selector infected WIXOSS	Iona Urazoe/Yuki	also selector spread WIXOSS	
2015	Wanna Be the Strongest in the World	Chinatsu Suzumoto		
2015	Yona of the Dawn	Daseot's Wife		
2015	Yurikuma Arashi	Konomi Yurikawa	credited as Staci Moon	
2016	Dimension W	Tsubaki Azumaya	Eps. 6–7, 12	
2016	Danganronpa 3: The End of Hope's Peak High School: Future Arc	Monomi		
2016–present	Fairy Tail	Elfman Strauss (child), Minerva Orland, others		
2016	The Disastrous Life of Saiki K.	Kaido's Mother	Eps. 10, 12	
2016	Garo: The Animation	Anna Luís		
2016	Keijo!!!!!!!!	Kyoko Shirayuki	credited as Staci Moon	
2016	Overlord	Narberal Gamma / Nabé		
2016	Puzzle & Dragons X	Valkyrie		
2016	Tōken Ranbu: Hanamaru	Imanotsurugi		
2016	Aokana: Four Rhythm Across the Blue	Misaki Tobisawa		
2017	Dragon Ball Super	Tights		
2017	ACCA: 13-Territory Inspection Dept.	Kelly		
2017	Alice & Zōroku	Shizuku Ichijō		
2017	D.Gray-man	Kawamura		
2017	Garo: Crimson Moon	Kosode	Ep. 5	
2017	Gosick	Jacqueline de Signore		
2017	Hyōka	Kimura	Eps. 12–13	
2017	Joker Game	Miyoko Yasuhara	Ep. 12	
2017	Knight's & Magic	Kerhild Hietakangas		
2017	Love Tyrant	Seiji's Grandmother		
2017	Restaurant to Another World	Tiana Silvario XVI	Ep. 10	
2017	Saiyuki Reload Blast	Sharak	Ep. 7	
2017	Sakura Quest	Izumi Koyama	Ep. 10	
2017	Space Patrol Luluco	Sucy Manbavaran	Ep. 8	
2017	Taboo Tattoo	Aisha	Eps. 10–11	
2018	Ace Attorney	Wendy Oldbag		
2018	Concrete Revolutio series	Emi Kino		
2018	Magical Girl Raising Project	Cranberry		
2019	A Certain Magical Index III	Silvia	Ep. 26	
2019–2021	Fruits Basket	Mayuko Shiraki	2019 reboot	
2020	Our Last Crusade or the Rise of a New World	Millavair Lou Nebulis VIII		
2020	Nekopara	Maple		
2021	Full Dive	Hiro's Mother		
2021	How a Realist Hero Rebuilt the Kingdom	Elisha Elfrieden		
2022	Sabikui Bisco	Pawoo Nekoyanagi		
2022	Girls' Frontline	Helian		
2022	Tomodachi Game	Yuichi's Mother		
2022	Raven of the Inner Palace	Qiurong		
2023	Sugar Apple Fairy Tale	Emma Halford		
2023	The Aristocrat's Otherworldly Adventure: Serving Gods Who Go Too Far	Sarah		
2023	Frieren	Serie		
2023	A Returner's Magic Should Be Special	Azest Kingscrown		
2025	Yakuza Fiancé: Raise wa Tanin ga Ii	Tsubaki		
2025	Anne Shirley	Mrs. Spencer		
2025	To Be Hero X	Ken		
2025	Bogus Skill "Fruitmaster"	Signe		
2026	The Daily Life of a Middle-Aged Online Shopper in Another World	Old Lady Mage		

=== Video games ===
List of voice performances in video games
Year	Title	Role	Notes	Source
2012	Borderlands 2	Bard, Karima, Penny, Security Officer Booth	As Tasia Munoz	
2013	Aliens: Colonial Marines	Marines		
2014	Smite	Kali		
