= .hack//Quantum =

Japanese animated video series, 2010–2011

- Promotional artwork for .hack//Quantum.

クワンタム
- Genre: Action, Adventure, Fantasy, Science fiction
- Original video animation
- Directed by: Masaki Tachibana
- Written by: Tatsuya Hamazaki
- Music by: Kow Otani
- Studio: Kinema Citrus
- Licensed by: AUS: Madman Entertainment; NA: Funimation; UK: MVM Entertainment
- Released: December 27, 2010 – March 25, 2011
- Episodes: 3
- Manga
- Written by: Tatsuya Hazmazaki
- Published by: Kadokawa Shoten
- Magazine: Comp Ace
- Original run: 2011 – present
- Volumes: 1
- Manga
- Illustrated by: SOGA Atsushi
- Published by: Bandai Visual
- Magazine: Comic Gekkin
- Original run: 2011 – present
- Volumes: 3 (Online); 1 (Printed)

.hack//Quantum is an animated three episode OVA series for the .hack franchise, produced by Kinema Citrus and presented by Bandai Visual. It was initially scheduled to be released in November 2010, but it was later changed. The first episode was released on January 28, 2011, with the following two episodes to be released in one month intervals. Excluding the all-CGI animation movie .hack//G.U. Trilogy, it is the first animated OVA project not to be produced by Bee Train. It is not related to a planned CGI movie tie-in to the newest game in the .hack series, .hack//Link. Masaki Tachibana of Tokyo Magnitude 8.0 directed the OVA project and .hack// writer Tatsuya Hamazaki scripted. Kinema Citrus animated the series and Kow Otani composed the music. Yuuka Nanri performed the theme song for the series. At Anime Weekend Atlanta 2011, Funimation announced that it had licensed the series and it was released on DVD and Blu-ray on February 14, 2012, making it the first in the franchise not to be licensed by Bandai Entertainment. The UK release was published by MVM Entertainment on July 9, 2012.

== Story ==
In 2022, Sakuya, Tobias and Mary, play the latest version of the world's largest MMORPG: "The World R:X", created by Cyberconnect Corporation. As they take on a quest, they become caught in strange circumstances.

=== Characters ===
Asumi Aida (相田 亜澄, Aida Asumi) / Sakuya (サクヤ, Sakuya)
Voiced by: Kana Hanazawa (Japanese); Trina Nishimura (English)
A high school student living in Aomori, who formed a party with three of her friends in "The World R:X". Her player character, Sakuya, is based on Kite. She says "Look before you jump", before charging off into dangerous places, and has a habit of picking up any items. Both Asumi and Sakuya share the same cheerful personality.
Iori Ikuta (生田 衣織, Ikuta Iori) / Tobias (トービアス, Tōbiasu)
Voiced by: Miyuki Sawashiro (Japanese); Anastasia Muñoz (English)
Asumi and Eri's schoolmate. Her player character, Tobias, is based on Balmung. Also known as "Tobias the Informant", she adventures with Sakuya with a pretty-boy look. She has a cool and calculating-nihilistic personality. In reality, Iori has an air of adulthood around her; and, unlike Tobias, she is not picky about clothes, choosing practical wear over what is in-style.
Eri Etou (江藤 衿, Etō Eri) / Mary (メアリ, Meari)
Voiced by: Ayumi Fujimura (Japanese); Lara Woodhull (English)
The schoolmate of both Asumi and Iori. Asumi is the one who got Eri into playing "The World". Her player character, Mary, is based on BlackRose. She adventures with Sakuya and Tobias. Her personality runs in contrast to the wild look of the Edge Punisher class. She would many times be misled into doing their task. In reality, she is much more serious than her in-game counterpart.

== Episodes ==
Pre-orders of the theatrical release on Amazon.co.jp and animate come with a bonus Original Drama CD.

#	Title	Original release date
1	"WALKING PARTY"	November 11, 2010 (airdate), January 1, 2011 (sale date)
2	"WIRED PRISONER" "Wired Prisφner"	February 25, 2011 (sale date)
3	"The World-end Pallbearer" "the ωorldend Pallbearer"	March 25, 2011 (airdate); April 7, 2011 (sale date)

== Manga ==
The series is serialized in Comp Ace as ".hack//Quantum+" (pronounced "Quantum Plus"). Illustrated by Nao Mitaka (三鷹ナオ), and will follow the story as written for the anime by Kinema Citrus.

- Another manga was released in March 2011, titled (.hack//Quantum introduction) (.hack//Quantum I (イントロダクション)), and it was illustrated by SOGA Atsushi. The manga is a prologue to the events of the OVA series, and the first two chapters can be accessed freely in the Comic Gekkin website (owned by Bandai Visual). The third chapter was released on NTT DoCoMo phone. A printed version was released by Emotion Comics.
