= Jinki: Extend =

Japanese manga series

- North American cover of the first DVD volume

ジンキ・エクステンド
- Genre: Mecha
- Manga

Jinki
- Written by: Shirō Tsunashima
- Published by: Square Enix
- English publisher: NA: ADV Manga
- Magazine: Monthly Gangan Wing
- Original run: January 26, 2000 – September 29, 2001
- Volumes: 4
- Manga
- Written by: Shirō Tsunashima
- Published by: Mag Garden
- English publisher: NA: ADV Manga
- Magazine: Monthly Comic Blade
- Original run: February 28, 2002 – June 30, 2006
- Volumes: 9
- Anime television series
- Directed by: Masahiko Murata
- Produced by: Schreck Hedwick; Makoto Takigasaki; Shigeru Tateishi
- Written by: Naruhisa Arakawa
- Music by: Kenji Kawai
- Studio: Feel
- Licensed by: NA: Funimation
- Original network: TV Asahi
- English network: UK: Propeller TV
- Original run: January 5, 2005 – March 23, 2005
- Episodes: 13

Jinki: Extend (Japanese: ジンキ・エクステンド, Hepburn: Jinki Ekusutendo) is a Japanese manga series written and illustrated by Shirō Tsunashima. The story revolves around two girls who end up piloting giant humanoid robots called "Jinki" (which translates to "man-machine") and the manipulation behind the scenes that drew them inexorably together in a final battle. It takes place in two parts, in Venezuela during 1988 (Jinki), and in Tokyo, Japan in 1991 (Jinki: Extend). An anime television series adaptation animated by Feel aired from January to March 2005. The 13th episode never aired on television and was released as an OVA. This title was picked up in North America by ADV Films for $91,000, who released the series in three volumes and box set. However, in 2008, the title along with over thirty other ADV titles were transferred to Funimation.

== Plot ==
Aoba loves to make model robots. However, she is taken to a secret base where she discovers a new mecha, designed to fight the Ancient Jinki.

== Characters ==
=== "Angel" Members ===
Aoba Tsuzaki (津崎 青葉, Tsuzaki Aoba)
Voiced by: Fumiko Orikasa (Japanese); Brittney Karbowski (English)
Main pilot of Moribito Type-02 during the Venezuela arc and the protagonist of the original Jinki manga series and the Jinki: Extend anime. An avid plastic modeler and only daughter of Tsuzaki Shizuka. She would be "kidnapped" by Ryouhei Ogawara of the special "Angel" unit in Venezuela and join it to combat the Kodai-Jinki (Ancient Jinki) that were appearing rapidly all over the Table Mountain. In the manga, she and Ryouhei are childhood friends from many years earlier, while in the anime they apparently are not.
Ryouhei Ogawara (小河原 両兵, Ogawara Ryōhei)
Voiced by: Takuma Takewaka (Japanese); Jason Douglas (English)
One of the members of "Angel" and a former Jinki pilot. He is the only son of Genta Ogawara and is rash and short-tempered. His loyalty to his family and friends however, is second to none. When Genta was slain by Kokushou, Ryouhei vowed to avenge his father, and as seen in the J:E arcs, he would be traveling around searching for a "Katana user". During J:E, he would replace Genta as the leader of "Angel". During the Lost Years arc, Ryouhei would pilot the Moribito Type-0 in search of his father's slayer. In the manga, he and Aoba are childhood friends from many years earlier, while in the anime they apparently are not. It is also notable that while in the anime Ryouhei seemed to play only a support role, in the manga he plays a much larger role in the story.
Akao Hiiragi (柊赤緒, Hiiragi Akao)
Voiced by: Yūna Inamura (Japanese); Jessica Boone (English)
Main pilot of Moribito Type-02 during the Tokyo arc and is the protagonist for the J:E manga series. She is a serious girl that made her a group of hitojyogi. Akao is an amnesiac and does not remember anything from before 3 years ago, which was about the same time the events of the Venezuela arc happened. Akao is in fact a clone of Genta's late wife Akana Ogawara, created by Kokushou out of spite for his former mentor.
Shizuka Tsuzaki (津崎 静花, Tsuzaki Shizuka)
Voiced by: Satsuki Yukino (Japanese); Monica Rial (English)
Leader of "Angel". Shizuka leads the members of Angel against the mysterious Kodai-Jinki, and she is also the mother of Aoba. Shizuka ordered Aoba's kidnapping because she believed Aoba's cognate abilities would benefit Angel. Her true intentions however, was to turn Aoba into a killing machine that would follow her and Kokushou in destroying the world. The reasons behind this weren't explained in the anime, but was elaborated in detail in the manga series, specifically in volume 7 of Jinki: Extend. After the events in the Venezuela arc, the trauma dealt to her during the conflict turned her into a human vegetable, and her life was eventually used to create the clone, Shiva.
Genta Ogawara (小河原 現太, Ogawara Genta)
Voiced by: Rokurō Naya (Japanese); John Swasey (English)
Leader of "Angel" after Shizuka, and former Jinki pilot as well as having first rate skills with the sword. He trains Aoba seriously. Genta is Ryouhei's father and close acquaintance of Shizuka. Genta would later die from a mortal wound caused by his former student, Kokushou, once known as Hino Hakuya, in a duel. Genta also once piloted the Moribito Type-0, prototype of Moribito Type-01.
Elny Tachibana (エルニィ立花)
Voiced by: Tomoko Kawakami (Japanese); Cynthia Martinez (English)
A young tomboy genius with IQ over 300 and grand-daughter to one of Angel's former Jinki scientists. Elny is a budding Jinki technician as well as an able Jinki pilot. Her favorite sport is soccer. Elny first met Aoba and Ryouhei in Venezuela when they were escaping from the military with Moribito's core. With Elny's help, the two were able to rebuild Moribito and fight again. In J:E, Elny pilots the Brocken Touja.
Satsuki Kawamoto (川本 さつき, Kawamoto Satsuki)
Voiced by: Ai Nonaka (Japanese); Allison Sumrall (English)
A young Cognate who works at an Inn and makes her debut in the J:E arc. Satsuki is the young sister of Jinki technician Kawamoto Hiroshi, and loves her brother dearly. Being weak and pacifistic, Satsuki would almost fall prey to the efforts of the predatory Karis Nohman of the Hachishoujin although she would be rescued by Ryouhei and members of the Tokyo division of Angel. Satsuki would later pilot the jinki Nana-Two Light.
Mel J. Vanette (メル・J・ヴァネット)
Voiced by: Junko Minagawa (Japanese); Christine Auten (English)
A mysterious woman bent on revenge. In the anime, she was after J. Harn, a member of the Hachishoujin, to avenge the death of her younger brother, Cecil. In the manga however, she was also after J. Harn, but as revenge for the betrayal he wrought on her (as she does not have a younger brother in the manga). Her true name is Michelle E. Harn. Mel J. is an expert marksman whose skills were taught by her former mentor J. Harn. In the manga, Mel J. has the ability to regenerate wounds and damage at an accelerated rate. She pilots the silver-plated Schneigar Touja.
Minami Kousaka (黄坂 南, Kōsaka Minami)
Voiced by: Yoshino Takamori (Japanese); Shelley Calene-Black (English)
During Jinki, Minami was the chief of Heavens' recovery team in Kanaiman Angel. In J:E, she was "Angel"'s representative and helps coordinate everything. The more playful Minami of the Jinki arc was replaced with the more serious and responsible adult that she becomes in the J:E arc. During the Venezuela arc, Minami was the upper operator of the Nana-Two Way Custom.
Rui Kousaka (黄坂 ルイ, Kōsaka Rui)
Voiced by: Yukari Tamura (Japanese); Luci Christian (English)
A "cool" girl is the best way to describe her. Although Rui bears the same surname as Minami, they are in fact not at all related. Rui was put into Minami's care when her father Cole Window, former chief of Heavens' recovery team, lost his life to avenge his friends. Minami treats Rui as if she was her own daughter. When Rui first appeared in the Venezuela arc, she would challenge Aoba many times to become the main pilot of the Moribito. The two would become friends through the process, but their rivalry never ends. Rui pilots the Nana-Two Way Custom with Minami during the Venezuela arc, but she will switch to the Nana-Two Mild in the Tokyo arc.
Hiroshi Kawamoto (川本 宏, Kawamoto Hiroshi)
Voiced by: Daisuke Hirakawa (Japanese); Chris Patton (English)
One of the many technicians of Angel's Kanaiman branch "Heavens".
Kouse (こうせ, Kōse)
Voiced by: Mamoru Miyano (Japanese); Blake Shepard (English)
In the anime Kouse is an orphan who, under Shizuka's care, is trained to be a Jinki pilot and cold-blooded killer. She would send him to "test" Aoba in the anime. In the manga however, Kouse was not related to Shizuka in any way, and although he was still an orphan, he was a member of the military, and worked with Shouse (who did not appear in the anime) to stop the autonomous actions of "Angel" in Venezuela. In either case, Aoba befriends him and they work together to stop Kokushou in the manga. In the anime, he would be shot by Shizuka and although he was wounded he does not die from it. Kouse pilots with Shouse, the Jinki "Schneigar CX". In J:E, Kouse is a Jinki test-pilot as well as regular member of "Angel". In what little appearances he made in J:E, he was last seen piloting the prototype flight/transformation-capable Jinki called D-77 Masamune.
Shouse (しょうせ, Shōse)
Shouse appears only in the manga. He is a red-headed member of the Venezuelan military, and is Kouse's partner as a Jinki operator. He too would later join "Angel", but would leave the battlefield, and acts as Angel's Uliman branch's intelligence operative; basically a spy.

=== Kyomu ===
Kokushou
Voiced by: Daisuke Namikawa (Japanese); John Gremillion (English)
Formerly known as Hino Hakuya. Former student of Ogawara Genta, pilot of the Moribito Type-01 as well as leader of Kyomu and Aoba's father. Kokushou (meaning Dark General), wasn't always so hating of the world.

Kokushou in anime
As a child, Hakuya was in love with Akana. Later in jealous rage he tried to kill Genta. Instead, Akana threw herself to stop Hakuya, dying in the process. This drives Hakuya on a nihilistic quest to destroy the world. Soon after killing Akana accidentally, Hakuya rapes Shizuka.
Kokushou in manga
As a young boy, Hino Hakuya lead a bright and happy life as a Jinki test pilot, and with the love of his life, Tsuzaki Shizuka by his side, nothing was better. However, he would one day be scarred when the Venezuelan military holds Shizuka hostage so that he would crush a peaceful riot with the brutal murderous force of a Jinki, the Moribito Type-01. When he returned to base, he learns that Shizuka had been raped by the soldiers, and in his rage, slaughtered everyone else he saw. Hakuya would come to the conclusion that Jinki are evil, and he set out to kill every living Jinki scientist to cleanse the world of it. In the ensuing chaos, Hakuya would kill many, until he faced his former mentor, Ogawara Genta, in a Jinki battle. Hakuya would be blinded in that battle and though he lost, he would from then on curse the living and promised the destruction of all.

Thus Kokushou was born. Kokushou would gather a group of elite soldiers, and create the Hachishoujin. He created the clones, Shiva, and Akao, and with aid from unknown benefactors, he was supplied with many Jinki and bio soldiers to achieve his ends. Kokushou pilots the Moribito Type-01 in the manga. In the anime however, he was seen only to have piloted the Kiribito Core.
Shiva
Voiced by: Akiko Hiramatsu (Japanese); Kira Vincent-Davis (English)
The apparent leader of the Hachishoujin as well as a member herself. She serves Kokushou without question and is in fact, the clone of the late Tsuzaki Shizuka. In the anime, she pilots a black Moribito Type-01, but in the manga, she pilots the Kiribito Core (and thus possibly the Kiribto Zai as well, but that has yet to be revealed.) During the Lost Years arc, Shiva pilots the jinki called Black Rondo. In this arc, Shiva is gravely wounded in combat against Ogawara Ryouhei in the Moribito Type-0, suffering severe damage to her reproductive organs. Whether or not these injuries will have any effect on the plot or story is unknown, although a comment made by Yao after he rescues Shiva suggests this. According to official sources, "Shiva", is the correct spelling of her name, though the more popular version "Shiba" is used by many fans.
Karis Nohman
An enhanced human and extreme woman hater. He is sadistic to no end and would go into a frenzy if his target is female. He pilots the customized Bargoil Scissor.
Hamad
Voiced by: Shinji Kawada (Japanese); Greg Ayres (English)
In the anime and manga, Hamad is a member of the Hachishoujin. In the anime however, he was just a simple sex lusting pervert who disobeyed Shiva's commands and was killed for it. In the manga he was a bit more, though still not far from being his anime counterpart. Hamad excels at hypnotism and combat with cloth, and often teams up with Karis. Hamad's Jinki is called K-Ma.
Cecil
A young boy genius and a member of the Hachishoujin. He feels an affinity for Elny, who like himself, is a young genius, who feels alone and misunderstood in the world of adults. Although Elny would persuade him to change sides, he would refuse the offer and leave. His Jinki is able to transform into a helicopter-esque flying machine, but has yet to be named. Cecil appears in the anime with the same character design but only in Mel's flashback memories as her younger brother, and not as a member of the Hachishoujin. It is suggested that Cecil will later become Dr. Over from LIFE:ERRORS, which is one of Tsunashima-sensei's earlier works.
Barkus Vogeil
A giant of a man and another member of the Hachishou. He holds the belief that only those who win are those who are allowed to rule, and those who lose are doomed to follow. When he was defeated by Akao in volume 2 of the manga, his heart was changed and he decides to once again head back into the baseball field. He pilots the Jinki called O-Jaoga. Barkus does not appear in the anime.
Julie
Julie makes her appearance in volume 4 of the manga, and is yet another member of the Hachishoujin. She first appears as a new teacher at the school where Akao goes to, but later reveals to the party that she is in fact, a member of Kyomu. Julie's Jinki is the feminine figured Co-Shaparl. She also appears only in the manga.
Yao
The oldest Hachishoujin member who once fought against a younger Ogawara Genta when he lived as a hermit. His Jinki, has only shown appearance once in the Lost Years arc in Chapter 47 where it fires some sort of flash grenade to blind Ogawara Ryouhei and rescue a wounded Shiva. Outside of a Jinki, Yao attacks with taoist magic. Yao does not appear in the anime.
J. Hearn
Voiced by: Takaya Kuroda (Japanese); Jay Hickman (English)
In the anime, J. Hearn is a member of the Hachishoujin, and is the man responsible for Mel J.'s young brother, Cecil's, death. In the manga, he is also a member of the Hachishou. J. Hearn was once Mel J's surrogate brother, and taught her everything he knew. One day 3 years ago in Venezuela, he betrayed her, and left her for dead. This has led to Mel J's obsessive search for him. J. Harn pilots a black Schneigar Touja called Dark Schneigar.

=== Others ===
Arma Jirou
Jirou is the armadillo that Aoba befriends in the manga. In the anime, it can be seen at the beginning of each episode where it tells the viewers not to watch anime too close to the TV.
Daving Soule
A Lieutenant General of the Venezuelan military who oversaw Rui's Cognate training after Angel was disbanded after the events in 1988. He takes a fancy to Minami, but isn't very good with the words for it. He also took part in the creation of the Hachishoujin and Kyomu after he was approached by Tsuzaki Shizuka and Kokushou. It is also revealed in the manga that Daving was present at both the original testing of the prototype Jinki models, as well as the incident where Tsuzaki Shizuka was taken hostage by the military to force Hino Hakuya into piloting Moribito Type-2. After proposing to Kousaka Minami, Daving was killed in battle in the operation to hold off Kyomu's initial advance towards Caracas in the Lost Years Arc when he used his own Jinki, the White Rondo, as a marker beacon for a nuclear strike which leveled the city and eliminated Kyomu's Jinki forces.
Akana Ogawara
Voiced by: Yuuna Inamura (Japanese); Jessica Boone (English)
One of a team of developers responsible for the creation of Jinki. She and Ogawara Genta would fall in love upon meeting and the two would be married soon after. However, when Hino Hakuya started killing everyone involved with Jinki, Ogawara Genta would step in to defend his wife. Though he was successful at defeating Hakuya's Moribito Type-01, Hakuya would attack him from behind and Akana, who saw what Genta could not, stepped in between to protect him. Hakuya would kill Akana before leaving a wounded and grieving Genta.

== Media ==
=== Manga ===
In early 2007, the series was dropped from the pages of its publisher, Mag Garden, for many reasons, one of which was Tsunashima disagreeing with the editor-in-chief of Monthly Comic Blade regarding the mecha of the manga. The series eventually restarted in the Dengeki Moeoh magazine published by MediaWorks.

=== Anime ===
An anime television series adaptation animated by Feel aired from January to March 2005. The 13th episode never aired on television and was released as an OVA. This title was picked up in North America by ADV Films for $91,000, who released the series in three volumes and box set. However, in 2008, the title along with over thirty other ADV titles were transferred to Funimation.

=== Video games ===
Giga would go on to create multiple adult games in the franchise on PC, complete with art by Tsunashima himself. They include 2010's Jinki Extend Re:Vision, a retelling of the Extend manga, 2020's Jinki Resurrection, a sequel to the Extend manga's Complete Edition, and 2022's Jinki Unlimited.

== Reception ==
"If you have the same strange urge for girls and robots that I do, you're all but guaranteed to enjoy this one." — Kevin Gifford, Newtype USA.
