= Brittney Karbowski =

American voice actress (born 1986)

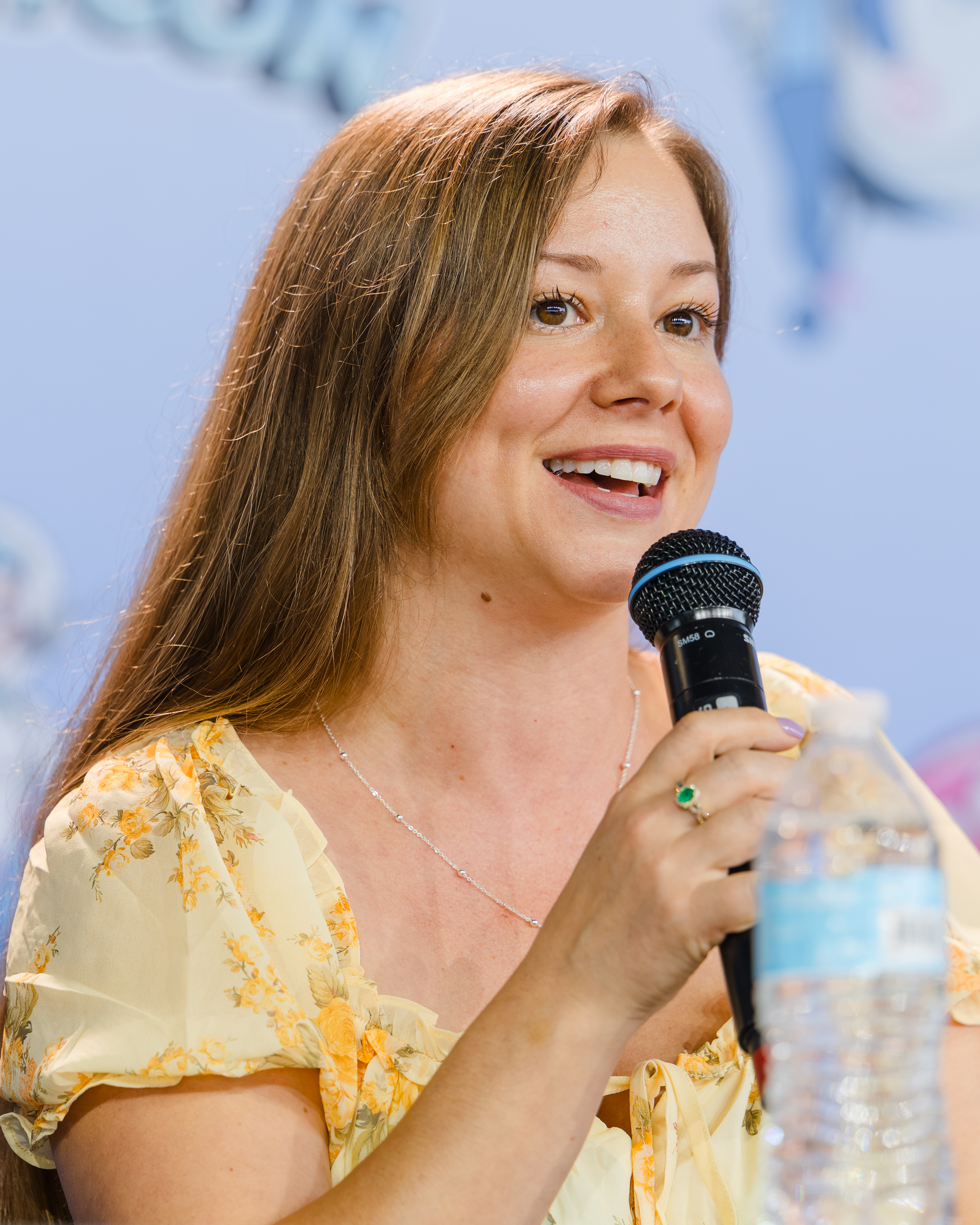
- Karbowski at GalaxyCon Nashville in 2026
- Born: Brittney Marie Karbowski; June 26, 1986 (age 40); Sugar Land, Texas, U.S.
- Education: University of Houston
- Occupation: Voice actress
- Years active: 2004–present
- Works: Full list
- Spouse: Matthew Hernandez (m. 2013)
- Children: 2
- Website: brittneykarbowski.com

Brittney Marie Karbowski ([karˈbaʊski]; born June 26, 1986) is an American voice actress who has voiced in a number of English-language versions of Japanese anime series.

Karbowski was born in Sugar Land, a suburb of Houston. Her career began in 2004, and she has since voiced Mikoto Misaka in A Certain Magical Index and A Certain Scientific Railgun, Black Star in Soul Eater, Migi in Parasyte, Rimuru Tempest in That Time I Got Reincarnated as a Slime, Katsuragi from Senran Kagura, Lute in Monster Hunter Stories: Ride On, Sanae Dekomori in Love, Chunibyo & Other Delusions, Yuki Takeya in School-Live!, Nanachi in Made in Abyss, Zircon in Land of the Lustrous, Sarasa Feed in Management of a Novice Alchemist, Mikan Yuuki in To Love Ru, Wendy Marvell in Fairy Tail, Yamada in B Gata H Kei, Camie Utushimi in My Hero Academia, Saori Arisugawa in Tribe Nine, and Mei Kinosaki in Marriagetoxin.

In addition to her voice acting career, Karbowski has starred in numerous films such as Puncture and The Starving Games.

== Early life ==
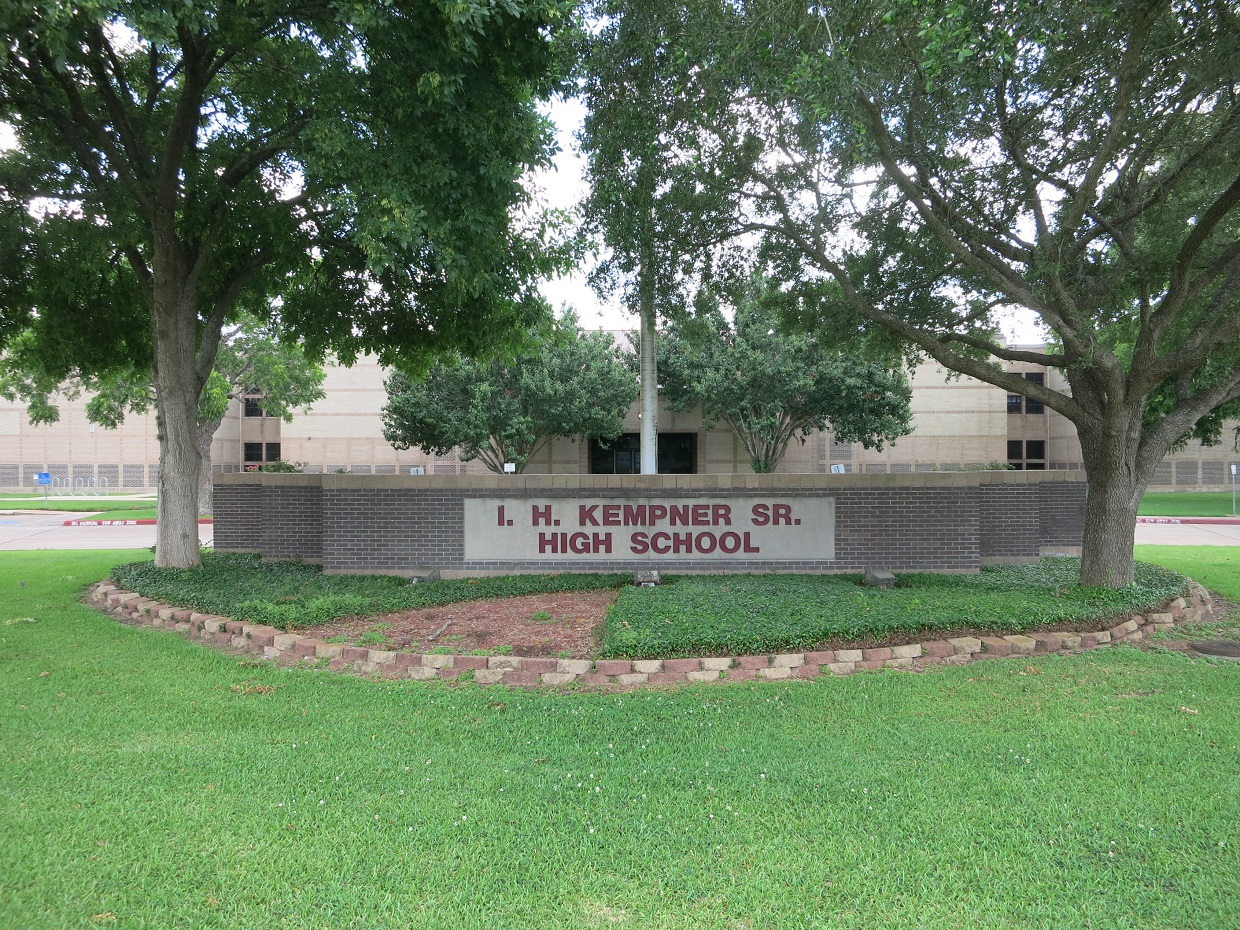
Karbowski attended Kempner High School from 2000 to 2004.

Brittney Marie Karbowski was born on June 26, 1986, in Sugar Land, Texas. She attended Kempner High School (where fellow graduate Ashley Spillers also attended) and later the University of Houston School of Theatre and Dance briefly where she majored in theater.

== Career ==
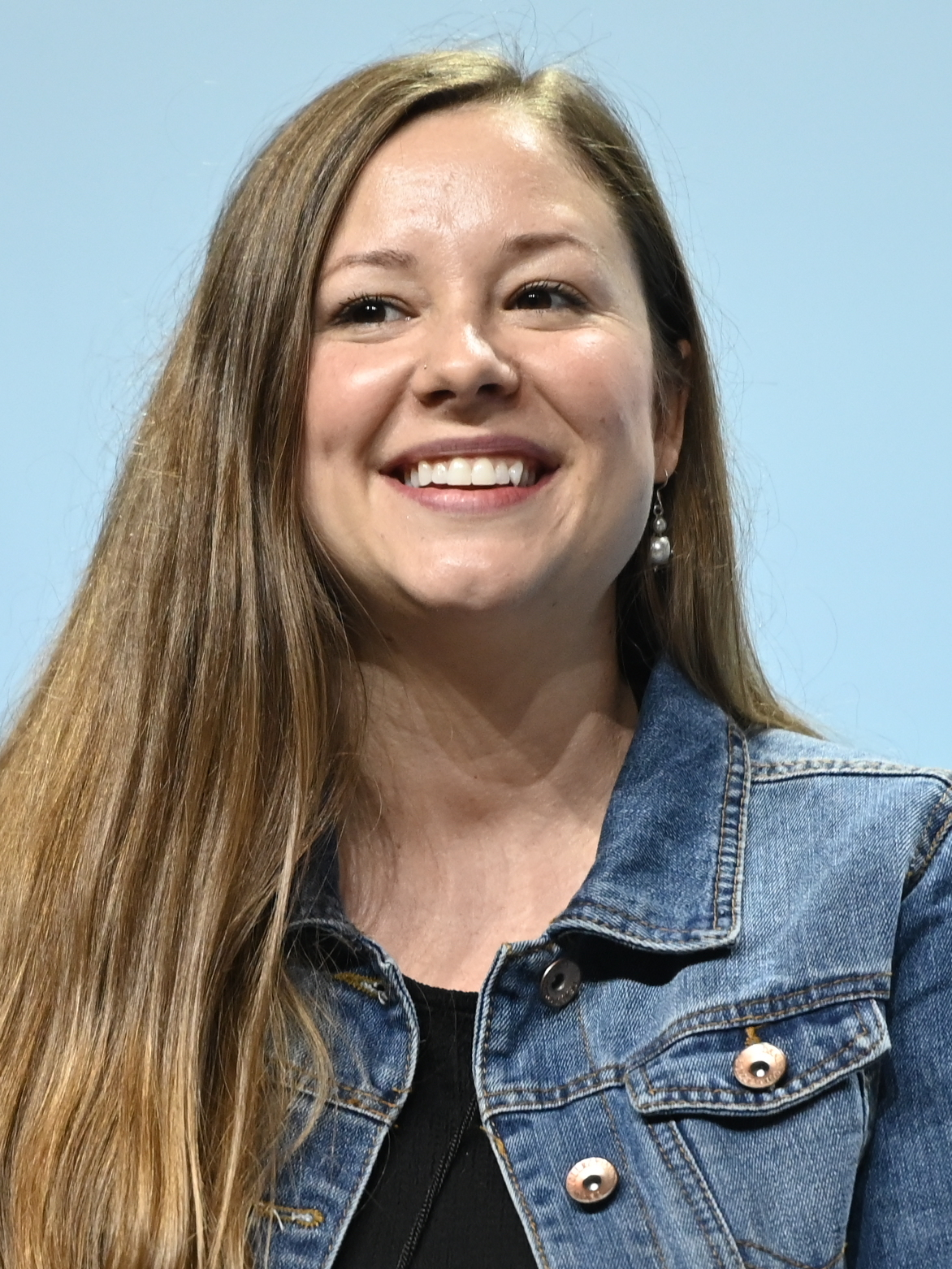
Karbowski in 2023.

Karbowski started her acting career in theater productions such as Little Shop of Horrors, Seussical, and Pirates of Penzance in Houston, Texas. While playing Janet in a local stage production of The Rocky Horror Show, she was noticed by a director from ADV Films. Her start into the anime business occurred in 2004, when she was asked to be an extra in the series Gantz. By December 2006 she stated that Fuko from Gilgamesh was her favorite dub as she thought the character was "cute and wicked, but wicked in a good way". She eventually received starring roles as Himeko Katagiri in Pani Poni Dash and as Aoba Tsuzaki in Jinki: Extend through her work at ADV Films.

Karbowski started voicing for Funimation in 2007 with a starring role as Mai in Itsudatte My Santa!. She also expanded her voice acting to other venues when she voiced her first video game character in 2007 as Pinkun in Akiba's Beat. ADV Films ultimately ceased operations in 2008, and several properties were transferred to Funimation. It was also during this time that she voiced the lead heroine Ayu Tsukimiya in Kanon after the title transfer had taken place. Karbowski has since dubbed dozens of characters including both major and minor roles through Funimation.

Karbowski has also had roles in films such as Celie in Up & Down, Susie in Puncture and a backpack girl in The Starving Games. She was slated to be a lead character Zax in the science fiction Code of Evil. Karbowski starred in the 2014 horror film Atrocity.

== Personal life ==
Karbowski was briefly hospitalized with a broken neck in 2010 due to a car accident.

She married Matthew Hernandez on October 11, 2013. They have two children.
