= List of Jormungand characters =

Jormungand (ヨルムンガンド, Yorumungando) is a manga series by Keitarou Takahashi, which was serialized in Monthly Sunday Gene-X magazine and published in North America by Viz Media. An anime television series produced by White Fox was broadcast between April and June 2012. A second season titled Jormungand: Perfect Order aired from October to December 2012. Both seasons have been licensed by Funimation in North America and Manga Entertainment in the United Kingdom.

== Main characters ==
The protagonists of Jormungand. From left to right: William "Wiley" Nelson, Lehm Brick, Mao, Sofia "Valmet" Velmer, Koko Hekmatyar, Lutz, Akihiko Tojo, Renato "R" Socci, Ugo and Jonathan "Jonah" Mar.

Koko Hekmatyar (ココ·ヘクマティアル, Koko Hekumatiaru)
Voiced by: Marina Inoue (Drama CD), Shizuka Itō (Anime) (Japanese); Anastasia Muñoz (English)
The protagonist. A young arms dealer and the daughter of Floyd Hekmatyar, a global shipping magnate. Officially she leads the HCLI's European and African Logistics Division. She is physically attractive, with long silver-white hair, pale alabaster skin, striking blue eyes and her trademark smile, which is present even under dire circumstances. She is extremely charismatic and bold, which earned her great success in her business as well as the fierce loyalty of her subordinates. While generally behaving in a bubbly and slightly childish manner, Koko is actually rather ruthless and has been called a 'monster' by various characters. She claims that she sells weapons for world peace, but there seem to be an ulterior motive that she keeps as a secret to everyone except Minami Amada and Chinatsu (who was killed shortly after learning Koko's secret plan). She is very attached to Jonah and is very affectionate towards him, wanting him to experience life as a normal boy when not in combat.
Jonathan Mar (ジョナサン・マル, Jonasan Maru) / Jonah (ヨナ, Yona)
Voiced by: Mie Sonozaki (Drama CD), Mutsumi Tamura (Anime) (Japanese); Micah Solusod (English)
The supporting protagonist. A child soldier of Western Asian origin. After being orphaned, he joined the mountain infantry and was then assigned to a military base along with four other orphans. However, after Malka, his friend, was killed when made to probe for landmines, he annihilated the base single-handedly in order to avenge her and protect the other children. He was disarmed by Chiquita and met Kasper Hekmatyar for the first time. He learned that the base was actually intended to be destroyed anyway because it was in the way of the construction of a road that would benefit Kasper's arms trading business in Asia, and that in fact Malka had died for nothing but a road. As the punishment for killing his men as well as a test to examine Jonah's character, Kasper locked him up in a container for days with nothing but water. After Jonah was released, Kasper revealed himself to be the one who sold the weapons that destroyed Jonah's village, making him indirectly responsible for the death of Jonah's parents. Kasper made him a deal and promised Jonah that he would ensure the three orphans live a peaceful life in Japan. In return, Jonah would be employed as a bodyguard to protect Koko, his sister. Since the encounter with Kasper, Jonah has harbored a strong hatred for him and arms dealers in general. After joining Koko's crew, his sentiment towards weapons has not changed. However, he finds himself growing a soft spot for Koko, even though Koko always makes him feel that he is being played the fool. He is often portrayed as the straight man of the series, pulling the rest of the crew down to earth during some of their flightier moments.

=== Koko's Bodyguards ===
Sofia Velmer (ソフィア・ヴェルマー, Sophia Vueruma) / Valmet (バルメ, Barume)
Voiced by: Ayumi Fujimura (Drama CD), Sayaka Ohara (Anime) (Japanese); Carli Mosier (English)
An ex-jäger major of the Finnish Rapid Deployment Force who is skilled with knives. She is in love with Koko, but it is unknown whether Koko returns her feelings. Valmet comes from a military family and served as a UN peacekeeping officer in Africa. Her entire Finnish-led UN squad was annihilated by Chan Guoming and she herself lost an eye in that attack. Since then Valmet feels uneasy and even frightened whenever she sets foot on African soil. Her love of Koko is often used for comedic effect, as she will often blush when Koko is physically intimate with her and will even go so far as to take advantage of Koko during moments when the latter is drunk (showering with her, getting into bed with her, etc.)
Lehm Brick (レーム, Rēmu)
Voiced by: Unshō Ishizuka (Japanese); Christopher Smith (English)
The oldest member of Koko's crew and the second in command. A former Delta Force officer who was active in the Somali Civil War during the 1990s, he is a veteran mercenary with strong leadership skills. He first met Wiley during the Gulf War when he recruited him to assist Delta Force in blowing up an Iraqi chemical weapons facility; it was through Lehm that Wiley would go on to join Koko's unit. He acted as Floyd Hekmatyar's bodyguard together with Chiquita, his ex-wife, before joining Koko's squad. Lehm also does sniper work either alone or together with Lutz.
Mao (マオ, Mao)
Voiced by: Hidenori Takahashi (Drama CD), Go Shinomiya (Anime) (Japanese); Patrick Seitz (English)
A former artillery officer from an Asian country, he was discharged from the military after a deadly training accident and was later recruited by Koko. He is the only member on Koko's team that has a family which consists of a wife and two children. His family is completely unaware of his current work as a mercenary. His son and daughter are younger than Jonah and are said to look like their mother. He is put in charge of giving Jonah science lessons.
Renato Socci (レナート・ソッチ, Renāto Sotchi) / R (アール, Āru)
Voiced by: Tomoyuki Higuchi (Drama CD), Katsuyuki Konishi (Anime) (Japanese); Ian Sinclair (English)
A former Italian Army Bersaglieri intelligence officer. He had served in the Bosnian War as a UN peacekeeper. Later, he is revealed to be a CIA spy infiltrated on Koko's team. He claims to have a different girlfriend waiting for him at every major port in the world. While he was working against Koko by relaying information about her to the CIA, he still respects her and cares for her like everyone else on the team. He sacrifices himself to save Koko and Jonah from Hex's ambush; he is shot in the head in episode 15 of the anime. Koko would avenge his death by arranging the bombing of Hex's position in the mountains of Turkey via a B-52.
Ugo (ウゴ, Ugo)
Voiced by: Yūki Ono (Drama CD), Kiyoshi Katsunuma (Anime) (Japanese); Cris George (English)
A former mafia driver, Ugo was recruited by Koko after the mafia organization he worked for was wiped out by Koko's team for trying to make their payment with drugs. Ugo was spared as he was the only one disgusted because his younger brother died from drugs. He serves the group as Koko's personal driver and has excellent driving skills.
Lutz (ルツ, Rutsu)
Voiced by: Takuya Eguchi (Drama CD), Wataru Hatano (Anime) (Japanese); Greg Ayres (English)
A former sniper from GSG9. He serves as the team's main sniper. Because of his background in law enforcement, he is sometimes apprehensive about the enemies that the group faces; for example, he was unable to bring himself to shoot Chinatsu (of Orchestra) because he was not trained to neutralize such a young opponent. While many of Koko's bodyguards are former soldiers with experience fighting all sorts of wars and adversaries, he was a police officer who only ever dealt with criminals.
Akihiko Tojo (東條秋彦, Tōjō Akihiko)
Voiced by: Kazuyuki Okitsu (Drama CD), Hitoshi Yanai (Anime) (Japanese); Christopher Bevins (English)
A former operator of the Japanese Ministry of Defense's secret SR unit. Tojo had seen action in several black ops operations, including Cuba. Prior to his work in the SR, he worked in intelligence and was the kind of soldier who never saw action. He left the SR unit after their mission in Cuba went awry; they were forced to abandon some of their allies, disillusioning him. After abandoning the SR, he was recruited by Kasper within 20 minutes. He is put in charge of giving Jonah Math lessons.
William Nelson (ウィリアム・ネルソン, Uiriamu Neruson) / Wiley (ワイリ, Wairi)
Voiced by: Kazuhisa Tanaka (Drama CD), Kenji Nomura (Anime) (Japanese); Akron Watson (English)
An African American explosives expert and ex-lieutenant of the 20th Engineer Brigade of the XVIII Airborne Corps in the U.S. Army. He graduated from University of Virginia School of Architecture. His father and grandfather were both architects, thus it could be inferred that he planned to follow in their footsteps. Wiley met Lehm and Echo during the first Gulf War when Lehm recruited him to help blow up an Iraqi chemical weapons factory. Wiley both admired and feared the lethal effectiveness of Delta Force, and so he joined the unit shortly after Lehm left the military to work for the Hekmatyar family. After several years, Wiley paid Lehm a visit and met Koko. He is put in charge of giving Jonah English lessons. Usually making use of his demolitions expertise to turn the enemies' bombs against them, he is the only person on the team aside from Koko who is blacklisted by the FBI.

== HCLI Corporation ==
Also known as H&C Logistics Incorporated, HCLI is an American-based shipping company that secretly deals in weapons trade.

Floyd Hekmatyar (フロイド·ヘクマティアル, Furoido Hekumatiaru)
Koko and Kasper's father. Head of the HCLI and a global shipping magnate.
Kasper Hekmatyar (キャスパー·ヘクマティアル, Kyasupā Hekumatiaru)
Voiced by: Masaya Matsukaze (Japanese); Eric Vale (English)
Koko's elder brother. Belongs to HCLI's Asian Logistics Division. He is the one who sold the weapons responsible for the deaths of Jonah's parents, and also the reason Jonah joined up with Koko. He and Koko were born on a container ship at sea so they had no real nationality or homeland despite owning numerous fake passports. He is noted for his strong physical resemblance with Koko, with the same silver-white hair, pale skin and blue eyes, even though they are not twins. Personality-wise, his resourcefulness and craftiness seems to be on par, if not superior to, that of Koko's. He is quite affectionate towards and protective over Koko, but when doing business, he puts on a more professional air.
Chiquita (チェキータ, Chekīta)
Voiced by: Yumi Tōma (Japanese); Clarine Harp (English)
Kasper's ruthless head of security and Lehm's ex-wife. Both Chiquita and Lehm used to serve as Floyd Hekmatyar's bodyguards. Chiquita refers to Jonah as "My Mishka" and grows quite attached to him, to the point of being openly affectionate.

== CCAT ==
Currie's Company Aerial Transport is a British-based corporation and Koko's rival weapons dealer.

Curry (カリー, Karē)
Voiced by: Katsuhisa Hōki (Japanese); Kent Williams (English)
A weapons dealer and head of CCAT. A former Royal Air Force pilot. He has a short fuse and enjoys manipulating situations to Koko's disadvantage. Near the end of the series, Miami jokingly advises him to leave the arms trade and open a restaurant since Koko's plan will render the entire industry obsolete. During the end of the series, it is shown that he actually did open a restaurant with Mildo and Lu.
Mildo (ミルド, Mirudo)
Voiced by: Ayumi Tsunematsu (Japanese); Caitlin Glass (English)
One of Curry's bodyguards. She has an obsessive crush on Valmet, who she admires as a fellow warrior. She is amazed by Valmet's skills, especially considering that she only has one eye but is still capable of defeating her in the dark. They have fought many times, but Mildo has never won. Mildo is a knife-trained mercenary and as such, prefers using combat knives and machetes as her primary weapons. She has a short temper and will kill anyone who annoys her, even if it interferes with her boss's plans. However, even though she seems to be heartless, she once told Valmet that she believes soldiers are hollow and she hopes that if she can become as strong as Valmet, she might find something to fill the void. During the end of the series, it is shown that Curry quit the arms trade to open a restaurant, with Mildo and Lu continuing to work for him in this new capacity.
Lu (ルー, Rū)
Voiced by: Manabu Sakamaki (Japanese); Jeremy Inman (English)
Curry's other bodyguard. Unlike Mildo, Lu is much calmer and doesn't really say much. He stated that he enjoys cooking. During the end of the series, it is shown that Curry abandoned the arms trade and opened a restaurant, with Mildo and Lu continuing to work for him. It can be presumed that Lu will act as a chef.

== CIA ==
Jerry Schatzberg (ジェリー・シャッツバーグ, Jerī Shattsubāgu) / Scarecrow (スケアクロウ, Sukeakurō)
Voiced by: Yūki Ono (Drama CD), Tōru Nara (Anime) (Japanese); Robert McCollum (English)
A CIA agent who hunts down Koko and other arms dealers. With good instincts on shady deals, he is attempting to track down and seize the dirty money from arms trade for the CIA. Unfortunately, due to his clumsiness or unexpected factors, not everything works as he plans, which is why Koko is able to escape from him many times.
Schokolade (ショコラーデ, Shokorāde)
Voiced by: Ami Koshimizu (Japanese); Brittney Karbowski (English)
A CIA asset in South Africa assigned to work with Scarecrow. She's more sympathetic to Koko and secretly works as Koko's informant. She is often portrayed as being incompetent, easily losing track of Koko and her unit, much to Scarecrow's annoyance. She is also a voracious eater, always making sure to sample as many delicacies from wherever she happens to be.
George Black (ジョージ·ブラック, Jōji Burakku) / Bookman (ブックマン, Bukku Man)
Voiced by: Tsutomu Isobe (Japanese); Mark Stoddard (English)
Creator of "Operation Undershaft", a plan to 'tame Koko Hekmatyar' and gain access to HCLI's enormous logistics network. R and Hex's superior. He is a man with many aliases and is most commonly known as "Bookman". He was addressed as "Burattinaio" (puppeteer) during his time in Bosnia. R calls him "Saw", but George refuses to be called that after R's death.
Hex (へックス, Hekkusu)
Voiced by: Aya Hisakawa (Japanese); Jamie Marchi (English)
A jingoistic patriot. Ex-member of the female Wide Range Communications Platoon and a CIA Special Activities Division operative. Stationed in Afghanistan after her fiance was killed in the September 11 attacks, she was later discharged for her radical counter-terrorist methods that violated international law. Hex was later recruited by Bookman to crack down on arms dealers. Koko bears a grudge against her because she killed Echo, one of Koko's subordinates, a few years ago. She later goes against Bookman's order and repeatedly attempts to kill Koko, killing R when he buys time for Koko to escape. It is implied that she commits suicide when she sees the B-52 sent by Koko coming for her in the mountainous region of Iraq, though her ultimate fate is left somewhat ambiguous.

== Daxinghai Company ==
Officially, the Daxinghai Company (大星海公司) is a Hong Kong-registered company that handles shipping and trading of machine parts and natural resources. In reality, the company is a front for the Chinese government to develop oil and gas resources in third world countries as well as handling illegal arms trading and providing securities. All its paramilitary personnel were officially discharged from the People's Liberation Army (PLA) first before "joining" the company as civilian security contractors.

Chen Guoming (陳国明, Chen Guoming)
Voiced by: Takaya Hashi (Japanese); Jerry Russell (English)
The Head of Daxinghai who is always seen with a cane. Under his polite and well-mannered appearance is a ruthless man willing to do anything for the interest of China. Held the rank of major general in the PLA. He is the target of Valmet's revenge as her unit was killed by Chen and his men during a UN peacekeeping mission. Eventually, Valmet gets her revenge and kills him after finding the main Daxinghai headquarters in northern Africa.
Karen Lo (カレン・ロウ, Karen Rō)
Voiced by: Saori Kato (Japanese); Shelley Calene-Black (English)
A former lieutenant in the PLA. Officially she is Chan's secretary but actually she serves as his bodyguard as well as the commander of his soldiers. She tries to avenge Chan after his death, but is injured by Jonah. Homeless in South Africa, she is later recruited by Minami Amada and becomes her assistant.

== Orchestra ==
The Orchestra (オーケストラ, Ōkesutora) is a group of eight assassins with the metaphor of believing that weapons are instruments. Maestro and Chinatsu are the only known surviving members of the group.

Maestro (師匠, Shishō)
Voiced by: Tsuyoshi Koyama (Japanese); Christopher Sabat (English)
One of the last surviving members of Orchestra after the other seven lineup were wiped out. A ruthless assassin noted for his razor-sharp teeth and tendency to engage in gun fights. He and Chinatsu were ordered to track down a mafioso situated in Dubai. Their next target was Koko who was also in Dubai. After a fierce gun fight between Orchestra and Koko's group, Maestro was ultimately killed by Lutz after recklessly attempting to attack the group despite Chinatsu's warning.
Chinatsu (チナツ)
Voiced by: Ai Shimizu (Japanese); Lindsay Seidel (English)
One of the last surviving members of Orchestra and the only female member of the group. She is a young woman who is always found working with Maestro together. During the events of Musica Ex Machina, Chinatsu sought revenge after Koko's group killed Maestro. Tracking them in a hotel, she was caught by Koko on a rooftop who shows interest and offers her to join her cause. Chinatsu adamantly refuses and attempted to kill her, only to get mortally wounded by Lutz's sniper rifle. In the anime, it was also revealed that Maestro orchestrated a massacre that killed Chinatsu's parents. Maestro was in complete surprise that she didn't leave or run away and still shot him in the shoulder, he approaches Chinatsu who was dazed in fear and gave her a kiss in the face before she was trained by the latter as an assassin, forming a Stockholm syndrome.

== Others ==
Minami Amada (天田 南, Amada Minami) / Miami ((マイアミ, Maiami)
Voiced by: Megumi Toyoguchi (Japanese); Gwendolyn Lau (English)
Koko's best friend and a Japanese expert of robotics. She is a butterfly fanatic. When she decided to chase after butterflies in the mountains she cried and begged Koko for her forgiveness since she was going to end up missing their meeting which Miami had been looking forward to for a year. There is a secret plot between her and Koko, codenamed "Jormungand". Like Koko, Miami also has a habit of rolling around on nearby surfaces when she's upset.
Elena Baburin (エレナ·バブーリン, Erena Babūrin)
Voiced by: Reina Ueda (Japanese); Kristi Kang (English)
An expert of quantum optics that is held custody by a military body in an unnamed Caucasian country. She is later abducted by Koko and assigned to work on "Jormungand" along with Minami Amada.
Leyla Ibrahim Faiza (レイラ・イブラヒム・ファーイザ, Reira Iburahimu Fāiza) / "Big Mouth" Rabbit Foot (おしゃべりラビット・フット, Oshaberi Rabitto Futto)
Voiced by: Aki Kanada (Japanese); Martha Harms (English)
Labeled as the "second coming of Julian Assange", Leyla is a quantum physicist, hacker and online activist, illegally detained in the Guantanamo Bay detention camp with her true name and sex kept in secret from the public. She is later rescued by Koko and recruited to work on "Jormungand" along with Minami and Elena.
Amalia Torohovsky (アマーリア・トロホブスキー, Amāria Torohobusukī)
Voiced by: Gara Takashima (Japanese); Lydia Mackay (English)
A Russian arms dealer and former actress stationed in France. She started her own arms dealing business with her late husband's connections. She is on friendly terms with the DGSE.
