= Itsudatte My Santa! =

2005 manga and anime

- English release cover of the DVD

いつだってMyサンタ!
- Genre: Christmas, romantic comedy
- Manga
- Written by: Ken Akamatsu
- Published by: Kodansha
- Magazine: Weekly Shōnen Magazine
- Published: December 24, 1997
- Volumes: 1
- Original video animation
- Directed by: Noriyoshi Nakamura
- Written by: Koichi Taki; Shoichi Sato
- Music by: Hiroshi Sakamoto
- Studio: TNK
- Licensed by: NA: Funimation
- Released: December 8, 2005
- Episodes: 2

Itsudatte My Santa! (いつだってMyサンタ!; lit. 'Always My Santa!') is a Japanese manga written and illustrated by Ken Akamatsu. It ran in Weekly Shōnen Magazine in 1997, before Akamatsu's Love Hina. A two-episode anime OVA adaptation was released in Japan on December 8, 2005. The OVA was licensed for North America by Funimation. Funimation's 2007 DVD release was recalled over a content-rating misprint, and the OVA received mixed reviews.

== Plot ==
In the story, a girl called Mai appears before a boy who happens to dislike Christmas. As it turns out he was born on December 24 and thus was named Santa, causing him to hate the holiday. Moreover, as a child, he never had any festive occasions, such as birthday parties. With the power of Christmas, Mai is given the mission to improve his luck and change his views for the better.

== Characters ==
Santa (参太)
Voiced by: Jun Kamei (Japanese); Chris Burnett (English)
A lonely boy who dislikes Christmas. He is often teased for his odd name. As he grew up, his parents were never there for him. His view of Christmas changes when he meets Mai.
Mai (マイ)
Voiced by: Aya Hirano (Japanese); Brittney Karbowski (English)
A student at the Santa Claus Academy that has problems using her magic. She can only conjure up things that start with "san" (サン) in the Japanese language. She was sent to San-chan to cheer him up as her mission but eventually falls in love with him in the process. Mai first appears to San-chan as a junior high school student. Later when San-chan starts to believe in Santa Claus, Mai gains enough Christmas powers to change into her grown-up form. In adult form, Mai oddly enough uses the hyper-masculine "Ore" (as opposed to the traditionally feminine "Atashi") when referring to herself, despite the feminine appeal that she gains with her transformation.
Sharry (シャリー, Sharī) (aka Shirley) (OVA anime only)
Voiced by: Yu Kobayashi (Japanese); Alison Viktorin (English)
Mai's best friend and rival. Unlike Mai, she is an elite in Santa Claus Academy. She says "Gorgeous" whenever she uses her magic, which can make any objects present to her grow to very large proportions. She was sent back to retrieve Mai in order for her to finish up her studies at the academy.
MaiMai (マイマイ, Maimai) (OVA anime only)
Voiced by: Yukari Tamura (Japanese); Colleen Clinkenbeard (English)
Mai's little sister who came to live with Mai. She has the tendency to tag along with her big sister (onee-chan) wherever she goes. She also slaps anyone that interferes with her spending some time with her onee-chan. At the end of the OVA, it is revealed that MaiMai snuck away from the Santa Claus Academy and is, in fact, the one that Sharry was supposed to retrieve.
Noel-sensei (ノエル, Noeru) (aka Miss Noel) (OVA anime only)
Voiced by: Tomo Sakurai (Japanese); Kelly McHalen (English)
A teacher from the Santa Claus Academy. She is the one that tells Mai that she has to say good-bye to San-chan because she has to go back home and continue her studies. Although, Mai might have misunderstood her when she told her this.

== Release ==
Itsudatte My Santa! ran in Weekly Shōnen Magazine in 1997 and was collected in a single volume by Kodansha. It was later published in German by Egmont Manga & Anime and in French by Pika.

The OVA, directed by Noriyoshi Nakamura at the studio TNK, was released in Japan on December 8, 2005. Funimation released it in the United States on December 11, 2007, but recalled the DVD after a printing error labeled it TV-PG instead of the intended TV-MA rating.

== Reception ==
Reviews of the OVA were mixed. Writing for Anime News Network, Theron Martin gave the Funimation DVD an overall C− for the English dub and C for the Japanese version, judging it too flawed "to be worth watching it even as part of the Christmas spirit"; he praised Aya Hirano's voice acting and songs but criticized the forced sentiment, the verbose dialogue, the frenetic pacing, and a weak musical score, and considered it inferior to the Christmas-themed bonus episode of Ai Yori Aoshi. John Sinnott of DVD Talk was more favorable, calling the two episodes "fun, light shows that are very enjoyable to watch" with "so much humor and wacky action that it's well worth picking up", and rated the disc Recommended. N. S. Davidson of IGN rated the DVD 7 out of 10.
