= List of Darling in the Franxx episodes =

- The logo of Darling in the Franxx.
- Starring: Yūto Uemura; Haruka Tomatsu; Yūichirō Umehara; Daiki Hamano (Note: Yūichirō Umehara was replaced by Daiki Hamano for the final two episodes due to a health issue.); Kana Ichinose; Mutsumi Tamura; Nanami Yamashita; Aoi Ichikawa; Saori Hayami; Hiroki Gotō; Shizuka Ishigami
- No. of episodes: 24

Release
- Original network: Tokyo MX, GYT, GTV, BS11, ABC, Mētele, HOME, BSS, BBC, AT-X
- Original release: January 13 – July 7, 2018

Darling in the Franxx (Japanese: ダーリン・イン・ザ・フランキス, Hepburn: Dārin In Za Furankisu) is a 24-episode anime series co-produced by A-1 Pictures, Trigger, and CloverWorks. It was directed by Atsushi Nishigori, with Nishigori and Naotaka Hayashi handling series composition, Masayoshi Tanaka providing the character designs, Shigeto Koyama acting as mechanical designer, Hiroyuki Imaishi serving as action animation director and Asami Tachibana composing the music. The streaming service Crunchyroll internationally simulcast the series, with Aniplus Asia simulcasting the series in Southeast Asia. Service partner Funimation began the dubbed release of the series in February 2018.

Darling in the Franxx is set in a dystopian future where children are artificially created and indoctrinated solely to defend the remnants of civilization. The story follows a squad of ten pilots, particularly focusing on the partnership between Hiro, a former prodigy, and Zero Two, a hybrid human and elite pilot who aspires to become entirely human.

The opening theme song, titled "Kiss of Death", is sung by Mika Nakashima and produced by Hyde, while the several ending themes, titled "Torikago" (トリカゴ) (ep 1–6), "Manatsu no Setsuna" (真夏のセツナ) (ep 7), "Beautiful World" (ep 8–12, 14), "Hitori" (ひとり) (ep 13), "Escape" (ep 16–20), and "Darling" (ep 21–23), are performed by XX:me (read as "Kiss Me"), a unit consisting of the series' main female casts—Haruka Tomatsu (Zero Two), Kana Ichinose (Ichigo), Nanami Yamashita (Miku), Saori Hayami (Kokoro), and Shizuka Ishigami (Ikuno). Crunchyroll is simulcasting the series, while Funimation is streaming it with an English dub. Aniplus Asia is simulcasting the series in South East Asia.

== Episodes ==
No.	Title (Note: All English titles are taken from Crunchyroll.)	Directed by	Written by	Studio (Note: The first half of the anime was produced by Trigger and A-1 Pictures' Kōenji Studio, while the second half is produced by Trigger and CloverWorks, Aniplex Inc.' subsidiary studio, rebranded from Kōenji Studio.)	Original release date	Ref.
1	"Alone and Lonesome"; Transliteration: "Hitori to Hitori" (Japanese: 独りとヒトリ)	Atsushi Nishigori; Toshifumi Akai	Atsushi Nishigori	CloverWorks (Note: Credited as A-1 Pictures Kōenji Studio (A-1 Pictures高円寺スタジオ))	January 13, 2018	
In the 22nd Century, humanity is forced to reside in massive, mobile fortress cities due to fear of attack by giant monsters called Klaxosaurs. Klaxosaurs can only be fought by Franxx, giant robots that require artificially created male and female pilots, termed "Parasites", to operate in unison. Dr. Franxx and Zero Two (Code:002) arrive in one such city to develop his latest Franxx. Hiro (Code:016), meanwhile, is left depressed after failing his test to become a Franxx pilot and synchronize with his partner, Naomi (Code:703). He encounters Zero Two by chance, who briefly flirts with him when he shows no fear of her horns. As Hiro's classmates attend the welcoming ceremony to become official Franxx pilots, Hiro debates leaving the city when a Mohorovičić-class Klaxosaur attacks. Zero Two deploys in her Franxx, Strelizia, to fight it, but ends up getting injured, and her partner is mortally wounded. Hiro volunteers to become Zero Two's partner, and she kisses him in response, activating Strelizia's true form. Strelizia effortlessly defeats the Klaxosaur, and it is revealed that Zero Two is a human-Klaxosaur hybrid, known as the "Partner Killer" for her reputation in killing her partners.
2	"What It Means to Connect"; Transliteration: "Tsunagaru to Iu Koto" (Japanese: 繋がるということ)	Shōko Nakamura	Naotaka Hayashi	CloverWorks	January 20, 2018	
Despite being able to pilot Strelizia with Zero Two, Hiro has no memories of what happened in the cockpit, leading some of his fellow pilots to be skeptical about what really happened since the rumored Zero Two is capable of piloting a Franxx on her own. Hiro's fellow pilots are also wary of Zero Two due to her unsavory reputation, especially Ichigo (Code:015), who is concerned about Hiro's safety. Meanwhile, the leadership of APE decide to test Hiro's abilities further and instruct him to participate in a mock Franxx battle. However, he is forbidden from partnering with Zero Two or using Strelizia. Ichigo volunteers to partner with him in Delphinium. Argentea pilots, Zorome (Code:666) and Miku (Code:390), volunteer to be their opponents. During the mock battle, Hiro is briefly able to connect with Ichigo and pilot Delphinium but suddenly loses his connection with her and is unable to restart it, breaking Hiro's confidence in himself and leaving Ichigo frustrated that she can't do anything to help Hiro.
3	"Fighting Puppet"; Transliteration: "Tatakau Ningyō" (Japanese: 戦う人形)	Toshifumi Akai	Masahiko Ōtsuka	CloverWorks	January 27, 2018	
Following the mock battle, Hiro's fellow pilots are assigned to their first sortie, with the task of defeating a Conrad-class Klaxosaur under the city. As they are about to leave, however, the connection between Chlorophytum pilots Ikuno (Code:196) and Mitsuru (Code:326) falters, thus the pilots of Delphinum, Argentea, and Genista proceed without them. The situation turns to the worst when they end up surrounded by a horde of Klaxosaurs and are forced to flee. Zero Two asks to assist them on Strelizia, but she is not allowed to sortie with Hiro until Mitsuru, determined to prove he is a better pilot than Hiro, offers himself to pair up with Zero Two. Together, Mitsuru and Zero Two defeat the enemies with ease and rescue the others, but when they return, they find a heavily wounded Mitsuru, as a consequence of pairing up with Zero Two, who reaffirms her claim that Hiro is the only pilot compatible with her.
4	"Flap Flap"; Transliteration: "Frappu Frappu" (Japanese: フラップ・フラップ)	Yuichi Shimohira	Naotaka Hayashi	Trigger	February 3, 2018	
Mitsuru begins to recover but is traumatized from his experience with Zero Two. In fear of what happened in the last battle, Zero Two is called back by the authorities to return to the front lines. As Zero Two is escorted to a transport with Strelizia, a Klaxosaur appears and attacks. The other pilots are dispatched to face it, but are overpowered by the enemy. Seeing Zero Two being taken away, Hiro finally makes up his mind and urges her not to leave and become his partner instead. Zero Two then disobeys her orders and boards Strelizia with Hiro, which he manages to successfully pilot. The two then help the others to defeat the klaxosaur. Afterward, Plantation 13 lifts off to rendezvous with Plantation 26, and Hiro resolves that he will pilot Strelizia with Zero Two, even if it kills him.
5	"Your Thorn, My Badge"; Transliteration: "Kimi no Toge, Boku no Shirushi" (Japanese: キミの棘、ボクのしるし)	Noriko Takao	Naotaka Hayashi	CloverWorks	February 10, 2018	
Plantation 13 links up with Plantation 26 in order to transfer much-needed magma fuel. However, since the process is likely to attract klaxosaurs, the Franxx pilots of both Plantations will have to work together. Meanwhile, Hiro becomes an accepted member of the Squad, but Goro (Code:056) notices that Hiro's health has been declining significantly with a blue tumor-like growth growing on his chest ever since he rode with Zero Two. Hiro manages to convince Goro to keep quiet about his condition. Klaxosaurs are detected heading for the Plantation, and a plan to defend against them is made. However, the pilots of Plantation 26 express their misgivings about Zero Two and Strelizia being involved due to their suffering losses in a past mission due to Zero Two's actions two years prior. That night, Ichigo confronts Zero Two in an attempt to convince her not to put too much of a burden on Hiro's body, but fails. Ichigo and Goro are then both left feeling frustrated over how neither of them can help Hiro. Hiro meets Zero Two the next morning, and despite her warning that this would be his third ride with her, which may result in his death, Hiro reaffirms his desire to ride with her, much to her joy.
6	"DARLING in the FRANXX"; Transliteration: "Dārin in za Furankusu" (Japanese: ダーリン・イン・ザ・フランクス (Note: The Japanese title of episode 6 is somewhat different from that of episode 23 in spelling.))	Yoshihiro Miyajima	Naotaka Hayashi	Trigger	February 17, 2018	
As the horde of Conrad-class Klaxosaurs, accompanied by a massive cube-shaped structure, approach the Plantations, the Parasites make a line of defense with Squad 26 on the front, Squad 13 in the middle, and Strelizia on the rear guard. After the minor Klaxosaurs are defeated, the structure reveals itself as a giant Gutenberg-class Klaxosaur that overpowers Squad 26. Squad 13 then rescues and joins them for a combined attack to give an opening for Strelizia to give the final blow. However, Strelizia fails to destroy the enemy, and Hiro collapses from exhaustion. He then accepts his death until he sees Zero Two fighting back desperately and decides not to give up, recovering from his tumor and joining his companions to destroy the Gutenberg Klaxosaur. As the pilots celebrate, Dr. Franxx rejoices at the prospect that Hiro may one day realize Zero Two's wish. Zero Two, on the other hand, affirms that there are many more Klaxosaurs for her to kill in order to attain it.
7	"Shooting Star Moratorium"; Transliteration: "Ryūsei Moratoriamu" (Japanese: 流星モラトリアム)	Tōko Yatabe	Rino Yamazaki	CloverWorks	February 24, 2018	
Due to their achievements in the previous battle, Zero Two is permanently assigned to Squad 13, and Hiro is officially recognized as a Franxx pilot. Squad 13 is then rewarded with a vacation to a nearby beach. As Squad 13 plays around, they observe Hiro's relationship with Zero Two and begin wondering what exactly a "kiss" and "love" are. They then stumble upon the ruins of a town nearby and begin exploring. They are perplexed at the existence of the town since they initially believed civilization only existed in the Plantations. Zero Two explains to them that humans used to live on the surface but were forced to abandon it for the Plantations after Klaxosaurs started appearing. While exploring, Kokoro (Code:556) finds a book about human reproduction. Zero Two questions Ichigo about her knowledge of kissing. Later that night, Zero Two decides to go for a swim while Hiro and Ichigo walk on the beach and admire the stars. Ichigo is about to confess her feelings to Hiro, only to be interrupted by a stream of shooting stars, so she holds off for now.
8	"Boys × Girls"; Transliteration: "Otokonoko × Onnanoko" (Japanese: 男の子×女の子)	Tensai Okamura	Naotaka Hayashi	Trigger	March 3, 2018	
The female pilots get into a fallout with the males after a battle where the females' clothes are destroyed by the enemy Klaxosaur's acid, much to the boys' enjoyment and the girls' dismay. The girls then set a line across the dorms and forbid the boys from crossing over. Zero Two ignores the fight and willingly and consistently crosses back and forth to get close to Hiro and even feigns joining in to set up a trap for the boys, who end up seeing the girls naked in the bath by accident. With the situation out of control, Nana steps in and reprimands the pilots for their behavior. While the boys and the girls discuss the situation separately, Miku decides to flee, and the others grow worried, so they set out to find her. They find her in one of the sealed-off rooms in the dorm, where they discover items related to the previous members of Squad 13, who were presumably killed in battle long ago. Realizing the risk to their lives, the boys and the girls finally make amends and resume their duties together.
9	"Triangle Bomb"; Transliteration: "Toraianguru Bomu" (Japanese: トライアングル・ボム)	Ryūta Ono	Rino Yamazaki	CloverWorks	March 10, 2018	
Squad 13 is dispatched to take down another Gutenberg-class Klaxosaur en route of collision with the Plantation. During the battle, Delphinium is caught by the enemy, and Goro ejects Ichigo to save her, but becomes trapped inside the creature while the others are ordered to retreat. Once back at the base, the others contact Goro, who affirms that he has a plan to take down the creature himself, while the other pilots are informed that despite Goro's situation, they will fire on the Klaxosaur should it approach the Plantation. The others then decide to fight the enemy again, but Ichigo insists on coming with them, fearing for Goro's safety. Just as Goro is about to activate the self-destruct sequence to Delphinum's energy tank, sacrificing himself to destroy the enemy core, Ichigo dives inside the creature and reaches him, allowing Delphinium to escape to a safe distance as the energy tank destroys the creature. After the battle, Goro confesses his feelings for Ichigo but claims that he is not in a hurry to hear an answer from her.
10	"The City of Eternity"; Transliteration: "Eien no Machi" (Japanese: 永遠の街)	Masato Nakazono	Masahiko Ōtsuka	Trigger	March 17, 2018	
The Seven Sages decide to reward the members of Squad 13 for their numerous victories against the Klaxosaurs, and they are briefly allowed into the city to be awarded with medals. The ceremony is short and sweet, but on the way back, Zorome drifts away from the rest and falls after seeing one of the few residents. When Zorome awakens, he is greeted by the woman who saved him, and he questions her about adult life. Her life seems worlds away from his experience and it is implied that the Parasites will never become adults as their physiology is completely different from that of normal humans because she had to use diagnostic instruments for animals to analyze his injuries. As they talk, Zorome can't shake the feeling that they have met before, but the woman denies it. The authorities arrive to pick him up and treat him as if he carries an infection, quickly sending him back to the dorm. Zorome spends the following days wondering why the woman was so familiar to him but immersed in his activities, his memory of her gradually fades.
11	"Partner Shuffle"; Transliteration: "Pātonā Shaffuru" (Japanese: パートナーシャッフル)	Takahiro Shikama	Hiroshi Seko	CloverWorks	March 24, 2018	
Squad 13 guards one of the facilities for the top-secret S-Planning when Mitsuru collapses in the middle of battle. As he is treated, it is revealed that he underwent a dangerous procedure with only a 15% survival rate to become a Parasite when he was a child. Later, due to Mitsuru's incompatibility with Ikuno, Nana asks the Parasites if they want to switch partners. Ikuno asks Ichigo to partner with her, but the two girls fail to synchronize. Kokoro offers to partner with Mitsuru, breaking a promise she made to Futoshi (Code:214) to stay together, much to Futoshi's despair. When a massive Klaxosaur appears, the Parasites dispatch with Mitsuru and Kokoro piloting Genista and Futoshi piloting Chlorophytum with Ikuno. During the battle, the pilots decide to use Genista's close-range attack to open a break for them, but cannot reach the core. Mitsuru gives up, still disheartened about Hiro forgetting the promise he made to him that they would pilot together in the past. Kokoro attempts to cheer him up before unsuccessfully and dangerously trying to pilot Genista by herself. Regaining control, Mitsuru and Kokoro manage to synchronize and open a big hole in the enemy to expose the core for Strelizia to destroy it. After the battle, Futoshi reprimands Mitsuru for his behavior, but Mitsuru promises that he will protect Kokoro in the future.
12	"The Garden Where It All Began"; Transliteration: "Gāden/ Hajimari no Niwa" (Japanese: ガーデン / 始まりの庭)	Yoshihiro Miyajima	Naotaka Hayashi	Trigger	March 31, 2018	
Squad 13 is sent back to The Garden to undergo some tests, the place where they were raised. They are greeted by the Nines, Zero Two's former Squad, and their leader, Nine Alpha, who wonders what Zero Two, formerly coded Nine Iota, saw in them. Disobeying orders, Hiro and the others visit the old facilities where they used to live, hoping to meet Naomi again. However, she is nowhere to be seen, and the adults refuse to tell them where she is. They also discover that the children from the Garden are being developed into Parasites at a much earlier age than Squad 13 did in response to the increased number of Klaxosaur attacks. When a group of Klaxosaurs attack the Garden, Squad 13 is dispatched, and Hiro notes that Zero Two's horns and canines have grown further. During the battle, a desperate Zero Two ignores orders and attacks alone, claiming that she must kill more Klaxosaurs in order to become truly human. After the battle, Hiro asks what her words mean, but she refuses to answer. Meanwhile, Ichigo eavesdrops on a conversation between Nana and Hachi in which they affirm that the Saurification process in Zero Two and Hiro is accelerating, much to her horror. When a second wave of Klaxosaurs attacks, Squad 13 sorties again, and once more, Zero Two turns rogue. She starts attacking Hiro when he attempts to stop her, causing Hiro to have visions of a past he had long forgotten.
13	"The Beast and the Prince"; Transliteration: "Mamono to Ōji-sama" (Japanese: まものと王子様)	Manabu Okamoto	Naotaka Hayashi	CloverWorks	April 7, 2018	
Hiro and Zero Two recall their childhoods in the Garden. Hiro was a successful but curious subject of the Parasite program who quickly befriended his peers, giving them names instead of numbers and promising Mitsuru that they would pilot together before his Elixir injection. Meanwhile, Zero Two was an experimental subject with animal features undergoing painful research into her regenerative abilities, her only source of comfort being a picture book called "The Beast and the Prince". After encountering Zero Two, Hiro was horrified when he discovered her tortured treatment and eventually broke her out of her cell and convinced her to escape with him. Unable to comprehend language, Zero Two saw a parallel between the storybook and her time with Hiro, vowing to become human and be with him. They are eventually hunted down and captured by security forces. Their memories are erased, including Hiro's promise to Mitsuru, leading to his anger toward Hiro, feeling betrayed. Back in the present, Ichigo in Delphinium warns Hiro to get away from Zero Two as she will consume his energy, but Hiro suddenly remembers that Zero Two is the girl from his past. The end credits reveal page by page the contents of Zero Two's cherished picture book.
14	"Punishment and Confession"; Transliteration: "Tsumi to Kokuhaku" (Japanese: 罪と告白)	Hiroyuki Kaneko	Hiroshi Seko	Trigger	April 14, 2018	
After the battle, Zero Two recalls her memories, realizing Hiro was her "darling" from their childhood experience. Meanwhile, Hiro is hospitalized while Ichigo and her friends forbid Zero Two from seeing him. As Hiro rests, Squad 13 is informed that they will take part in a large-scale operation to seize a fortress called Gran Crevasse, involving the Nines and squads from various Plantations. Additionally, the squad is informed that Zero Two will be transferred back to the Nines. Before the operation begins, Squad 13 works to prevent Hiro and Zero Two from meeting. She finally convinces them to let her see him, but Hiro has already left the room on his own to meet her and finds it empty. Believing that the others are deceiving her, Zero Two attacks them. When Hiro returns and sees Zero Two's behavior, he reprimands her, calling her a monster. Contrite, Zero Two believes this is her punishment for her past deeds and accepts she must leave his side. As the operation is about to begin, Zero Two leaves the dorm to rejoin the Nines, but when Hiro decides to go after her, Ichigo holds him back with a kiss and confesses her feelings for him, but he's in clear emotional turmoil over Zero Two leaving to even care.
15	"Jian"; Transliteration: "Hiyoku no Tori" (Japanese: 比翼の鳥)	Toshifumi Akai	Hiroshi Seko	CloverWorks	April 21, 2018	
Hiro stays behind while the rest of Squad 13 take part in the operation against the massive Klaxosaur horde at Gran Crevasse. Led by the Nines, the human forces appear to be defeating the Klaxosaurs until a gigantic, Super-Lehmann-class Klaxosaur emerges and obliterates Plantation 26 on a collision course with Plantation 13. In an attempt to halt its progress, the members of Squad 26 are ordered to mount a potentially fatal assault on the creature, but fail. The Klaxosaur stops and disgorges a horde of small Conrad-class Klaxosaurs, whom Ichigo and the others begin fighting until Hiro joins them in a training unit. Ichigo connects with Hiro and sees that his thoughts are all about Zero Two. She realizes that he has no room in his heart for her and cries. Nevertheless, Hiro reaches Zero Two aboard Strelizia with Ichigo's help, but finds her almost losing her sanity from operating alone until he confesses his love for her, and they synchronize. Together, they power up Strelizia to the point of single-handedly destroying the Super-Lehmann Klaxosaur and breaking open the doorway to the Gran Crevasse with help from the Nines. However, the Super-Lehmann's cores are still active and about to explode when a colossal hand emerges from the Gran Crevasse and retrieves the cores, astonishingly sparing the lives of Squad 13 and the residential area of Plantation 13.
16	"Days of Our Lives"; Transliteration: "Bokutachi no Hibi" (Japanese: ぼくたちの日々)	Yuuki Itoh	Rino Yamazaki	CloverWorks	May 5, 2018	
A month after the battle at the Gran Crevasse, the members of Squad 13 are left on standby at Mistilteinn in the ruins of Plantation 13. They do not realize that their new environment is part of an experiment by Dr. Franxx. Most of the services are suspended except for a weekly delivery of supplies, and they have no external contact, forcing the Parasites to manage by themselves. Despite their new responsibilities and hardships, they enjoy their new life together, especially Zero Two, who is more relaxed and warmly welcomed back into the Squad. Kokoro gives Mitsuru a haircut and then unexpectedly kisses him. The Squad works together to cook dinner for themselves. Later, Hiro and Zero Two spend more time together, and Zero Two shows him that she is rewriting her picture book, only for her to have a foreboding of something lurking outside the plantation.
17	"Eden"; Transliteration: "Rakuen" (Japanese: 楽園)	Ryōji Masuyama	Naotaka Hayashi	CloverWorks	May 12, 2018	
The Nines visit Squad 13 on Mistilteinn, causing them to feel less abandoned. Meanwhile, Hiro starts growing horns, which makes him more like his beloved. The Nines discover a book on human reproduction that Kokoro had been hiding. Meanwhile, Kokoro makes a pass at Mitsuru, which confuses him, though a talk with Hiro helps him realize his feelings for her. Later, when the Nines question Kokoro about possessing forbidden knowledge, she expresses the desire to bear a child, suggesting that they may not be creations of Papa and exist for more than fighting Klaxosaurs. Later, while Hachi and Nana interview Kokoro, Nana collapses, which Nine Alpha claims is a symptom of a regression into puberty. Hachi then informs Dr. Franxx, who decides to terminate the experiment of leaving the Parasites alone. Meanwhile, members from APE meet with the Princess of the Klaxosaurs (Code:001), demanding her surrender, but she slays them instead, calling them "human wannabes." (Note: Wannabe: a person who tries to be like someone else or to fit in with a particular group of people) Back in Mistilteinn, as Squad 13 debates Kokoro's ideas, Mitsuru visits Kokoro that night, and after he expresses affection for her, they consummate their relationship. Meanwhile, at APE, Papa discusses his plans to wipe out all Klaxosaurs when the Nines appear with news from their visit to Mistilteinn.
18	"When the Sakura Blooms"; Transliteration: "Sakura no Hana ga Saku Koro ni" (Japanese: 桜の花が咲く頃に)	Shigeki Kawai	Naotaka Hayashi	A-1 Pictures	May 19, 2018	
Ichigo is informed by Hachi that Squad 13 is about to be transferred from Mistilteinn to a special facility where the rest of the Parasites are stationed. The Squad decides to hold a wedding ceremony for Kokoro and Mitsuru. Ichigo visits Ikuno, who is recovering from a fever, and Ikuno confesses she is in love with Ichigo, as the latter gave Ikuno her name. During the wedding, the Nines invade Mistilteinn with a team of soldiers, taking both Kokoro and Mitsuru into custody. In a flashback, Nana is shown emotionally distraught at the death of her partner in a Franxx. Weeks later, at the Birds Nest camp for children, Mitsuru and Kokoro are reunited with Squad 13, but the others are shocked to see that they have no recollection of each other. Both Zero Two and Hiro realize that Mitsuru and Kokoro have had their memories erased, just as they had in the past.
19	"Inhumanity"; Transliteration: "Hito Narazaru Mono-tachi" (Japanese: 人ならざるモノたち)	Takahiro Harada	Masahiko Otsuka	CloverWorks	May 26, 2018	
The APE supreme commanders justify wiping the memories of Mitsuru and Kokoro in the interest of achieving their objectives. Dr. Franxx remembers back in 2025 when, as the scientist Werner Frank, he was hired by APE to research human immortality and his success five years later, albeit at the cost of human reproductive processes. He recalls how heavy mining of the magma energy on the planet led to rapid desertification and the appearance of the Klaxosaurs in 2037 and the consequent creation of the autonomous Plantations. He developed the Franxx units to combat the Klaxosaurs but at a considerable loss of life for their human pilots, including his fiancée, Karina Milsa. This led to the creation of children who would later become Parasites. In 2042, an expedition including Werner Frank was sent to meet the Klaxosaur Princess. The humanoid princess captivated him, but she then tore off his arm as punishment for destroying her Klaxosaurs. However, he returned to APE with a sample of her hair, from which he extracted the DNA to create Zero Two. Back in the present, Hiro and the others demand that Papa restore Kokoro and Mitsuru's memories but are told that their memories were erased and that restoring them is impossible. When Squad 13 realizes that they will never become "adults", Papa agrees to release them from duty once their next mission against the Klaxosaurs is over.
20	"A New World"; Transliteration: "Atarashī Sekai" (Japanese: 新しい世界)	Miyoki Kuroki	Naotaka Hayashi	CloverWorks	June 9, 2018	
The Parasites gather at the site of the Gran Crevasse for the final battle against the Klaxosaurs. As the others confront a huge army of Klaxosaurs attacking the base, Hiro and Zero Two are tasked to use Strelizia to control the "Star Entity", a massive weapon stored inside the Gran Crevasse. Amid the battle, Kokoro and Mitsuru are struck with pain at hearing their names. The Klaxosaur Princess sneaks past security and assumes control of Strelizia by violently dragging Zero Two out of the cockpit and forcibly synchronizing with Hiro. After the Parasites learn the truth behind the Franxx, an armada of spaceships suddenly appears in Earth's orbit, and the Klaxosaurs stop fighting the Parasites to attack it. Papa then reveals that he and his companions are actually members of "VIRM", an alien race that once attacked Earth but was defeated by the Klaxosaurs; all of APE's actions were part of their plan to use mankind against them. Having predicted the Princess' attempt to take control of the Star Entity, the VIRM triggers a self-destruct mechanism installed on it, with the intent of wiping out both the Klaxosaurs and Earth.
21	"For You, My Love"; Transliteration: "Daisukina Anata no Tame ni" (Japanese: 大好きなあなたのために)	Manabu Okamoto	Naotaka Hayashi	CloverWorks	June 16, 2018	
As the VIRM use their powers to upload the consciousness of the humans from the Plantation into their system, Hiro uses his connection with the Klaxosaur Princess to delay the explosion of the Star Entity while the rest of Squad 13 rushes back to the Gran Crevasse to help their friends. Delta and Epsilon, two members of the Nines, are killed by VIRM, sending Alpha into a rage and fracturing his belief in Papa. Meanwhile, a wounded Zero Two meets with Dr. Franxx, who explains that she and the rest of the Nines were created by cloning the Princess' cells, but she was the only one of them who inherited her powers. Determined to rescue Hiro, Zero Two then rushes back to Strelizia, assisted by Dr. Franxx and her friends. Upon reuniting with Hiro, who is bloodied and close to death, Zero Two and the Princess use all their energy to restore him and take back control of the Star Entity, which transforms into the gigantic Strelizia Apus and defeats the invaders. The VIRM then decide to retreat, promising to return with their entire armada to wipe out Earth. Just as Hiro celebrates their victory, he finds that Zero Two is not responding.
22	"Stargazers"; Transliteration: "Sutāgeizā" (Japanese: スターゲイザー)	Noriko Takao	Hiroshi Seko	CloverWorks	June 23, 2018	
The Klaxosaurs depart for space to fight VIRM, taking Strelizia Apus with them, while the surviving Parasites work together to ensure their survival, led by Squad 13. Zero Two is still in a catatonic state, and Hiro is puzzled by a series of wounds appearing on her body. After experiencing symptoms, the new Nana informs the others that Kokoro is pregnant with Mitsuru's child and are confused on what to do following the revelation. Meanwhile, Hachi and the original Nana locate the facility where the discarded Parasites are being held, including Naomi. They read a message left by Dr. Franxx before his death instructing them to take care of the Parasites. Desperate about Zero Two's condition, Hiro realizes that her consciousness is still inside the Strelizia Apus, fighting VIRM with the other Klaxosaurs in the orbit of Mars. He decides to leave for space to reunite with her despite his friends' protests. In the end, the other members of Squad 13 agree to accompany Hiro in an abandoned Klaxosaur spaceship and are joined by the surviving members of the Nines. However, Mitsuru stays behind, concerned for the pregnant Kokoro.
23	"DARLING in the FRANXX"; Transliteration: "Dārin in za Furankisu" (Japanese: ダーリン・イン・ザ・フランキス (Note: The Japanese title of episode 23 is somewhat different from that of episode 6 in spelling.))	Yoshihiro Miyajima	Naotaka Hayashi	CloverWorks	June 30, 2018	
Leaving Mitsuru, Kokoro, and Zero Two's bodies behind, Squad 13 departs into space to join the fight against VIRM. With help from the others, Nine Alpha partners with Hiro, who safely enters Strelizia Apus before Nine Alpha goes on to sacrifice himself in the battle. The VIRM offers humans perpetual tranquility and peace, but Nana and Hachi reject it as an unacceptable option. Meanwhile, back on Earth, Kokoro initially refuses Mitsuru's support, but he convinces her that despite losing their memories, they share a common bond through their unborn child, and they reconcile with an embrace. Aboard Strelizia Apus, Hiro slowly reunites with Zero Two's consciousness, and they agree to fight together again, converting the Strelizia Apus into the more powerful Strelizia True Apus, which obliterates VIRM's forces. After doing so, a warp gate appears, created a long time ago by the Klaxo sapiens. Hiro and Zero Two enter the warp gate, carrying a massive bomb created by the Klaxosaurs to destroy VIRM, promising their friends they will return home.
24	"Never Let Me Go"; Transliteration: "Watashi o Hanasanaide" (Japanese: わたしを離さないで)	Atsushi Nishigori; Manabu Okamoto; Miyoki Kuroki	Atsushi Nishigori; Naotaka Hayashi	CloverWorks	July 7, 2018	
Two months after Hiro and Zero Two leave through the warp gate to fight the VIRM in space, the surviving Parasites work together to rebuild society from scratch. Much later, Kokoro gives birth to a baby girl, whom she and Mitsuru name Ai. Naomi is rescued along with other missing children. Goro leaves to travel the world in search of other survivors and resources, but not before kissing Ichigo, which surprises her immensely. After two years in space, just as the Strelizia True Apus reaches the VIRM homeworld, Hiro and Zero Two's connection is cut off by VIRM's interference, leaving them vulnerable. Realizing that something is wrong by Ai's intuition, the members of Squad 13 join together to pray for their safety, and their thoughts reach Hiro, allowing him to reconnect with Zero Two. Together, they sacrifice themselves to destroy the VIRM homeworld, liberating all the souls trapped there. Despite that, the VIRM declare that they will return one day. With the war over, the remaining Klaxosaurs return to Earth's underground, restoring nature with their energy, and the Parasites declare that they will never use Magma Energy again. Eight years later, the world is restored to a prosperous state thanks to the Parasites' hard work. The former Squad, now in their mid-20s, reunites during their children's school entrance ceremony and remember Hiro and Zero Two. A thousand years later, after the rebuilding of modern civilization, Hiro and Zero Two's souls reincarnate as a pair of children who meet each other again.
