= List of Darling in the Franxx characters =

Below is a list of characters in the Japanese anime & movie television series Darling in the Franxx by Code:000.

== Squad 13 ==
A squad of ten Parasites who are the main characters of the series. The Squad is based out of Plantation 13, living within their home area, Mistilteinn (ミストルティン, Misutorutin), colloquially referred to as the Birdcage. Squad 13 is unique, most notably for their individually designed Franxx. The squad is also notable for referring to each other by names rather than their code numbers. These names are based on Japanese readings of their code numbers.

=== Pilots of Strelizia ===
Strelizia (ストレリチア, Sutorerichia) is the Franxx piloted by the series' two protagonists Hiro and Zero Two. It is equipped with a giant spear called "Queen Pike" to battle with klaxosaurs. Although humanoid in appearance when piloted by a male-female pair, Strelizia takes the form of a quadruped beast when piloted by Zero Two alone.

Code:016 (コード:016, Kōdo:016) / Hiro (ヒロ)
Voiced by: Yūto Uemura, Ami Koshimizu (childhood) (Japanese); Matt Shipman, Mikaela Krantz (childhood) (English)
Once called a prodigy, he is now a dropout pilot cadet after "losing" his ability to synchronize with his partner in the Franxx. So far, he is the only male able to pilot Strelizia with Zero Two without taking damage. It is revealed that Hiro was once a leader among the children and the one responsible for naming them, as well as asking the adults a lot of questions, although they never give an answer; he also witnessed Zero Two undergoing painful testing and the two ran away together as children, even going as far as to make a promise to get married when they become adults. Before they were captured and separated, Hiro licked Zero Two's blood from a cut, affecting his aptitude performance and making him incompatible with anyone except for Zero Two. He also slowly grows horns and develops other klaxosaur characteristics. Their memories of each other were then erased.
Although regarded as a genius, Hiro was looked down upon as a disappointment until he reunited with Zero Two and became the Strelizia's official stamen after being the only partner to survive riding with her three times. Hiro gradually recovered his memories of their past. Hiro admits to Zero Two that he has always been in love with her and they begin a relationship, as well as vowing to fulfill their promise. In the final battle against the klaxosaurs, Hiro is forcibly connected with the Klaxosaur Princess and finds out the true enemy is VIRM, led by Papa, which intends to destroy the planet if necessary to eliminate the klaxosaurs. Zero Two saves Hiro and they join forces with the klaxosaurs to force the VIRM to retreat. However, he finds that Zero Two is catatonic because she mentally linked with Strelizia to battle the VIRM in space. He makes the choice to join the battle to rescue her. After they reconnect, they overpower VIRM, who retreats again, and the two leave in a warp gate but promise to return to their friends. To defeat the VIRM and protect the future of their friends, they sacrifice themselves and detonate the VIRM home planet. At some point in the future, Hiro and Zero Two are reincarnated into two children who meet in the final episode.
Code:002 (コード:002, Kōdo:002) / Zero Two (ゼロツー, Zero Tsū) / 9'℩ (ナインイオタ, Nain Iota; Nine Iota)
Voiced by: Haruka Tomatsu (Japanese); Tia Ballard (English)

An elite pilot belonging to APE's special forces, Zero Two is a mysterious and rebellious girl often referred to as a monster due to her red horns and klaxosaur blood. She is also known as the "partner killer" as all partners who pilot Strelizia with her always die after riding three times with her at most, with Hiro being the only exception. She always refers to Hiro as her "darling". Her true age is unknown but her ultimate wish is to become fully human so she can reunite with an important person from her past, which turned out to be Hiro. Since she was a child, she was inspired by a book called "The Beast and the Prince", which she notes is similar to the circumstances of her and Hiro. She begins creating her own version of the story, but intentionally leaves the last page blank because of the likelihood she may have to part ways with Hiro.
She later finds out she is a clone of the Klaxosaur Princess created by Dr. Franxx. When Hiro is forced to link with the princess, Zero Two is able to mentally connect with Strelizia to save him and stop VIRM from destroying the planet but this left her body catatonic. Mentally, she continued fighting VIRM in a galactic battle in space. She and Hiro reconnect, allowing Zero Two to merge with Strelizia, becoming the Strelizia True Apus, and overpower the VIRM. She and Hiro then part ways with their friends but promise to return. In the final episode, Zero Two and Hiro are nearly defeated but they sacrifice themselves to destroy the VIRM home planet and free the souls trapped by VIRM. At some point in the future, they are reincarnated into two children.

=== Pilots of Delphinium ===
Delphinium (デルフィニウム, Derufiniumu) is the Franxx piloted by Goro and Ichigo. As the Franxx for the squad leader, it is armed with two sword type weapons named "Envy Shop."

Code:056 (コード:056, Kōdo:056) / Goro (ゴロー, Gorō)
Voiced by: Yūichirō Umehara (ep. 1-22), Daiki Hamano (ep. 23-24), (Note: Yūichirō Umehara was replaced by Daiki Hamano in last two episodes due to health problem.) Natsumi Fujiwara (childhood) (Japanese); Austin Tindle, Morgan Berry (childhood) (English)
A level-headed and optimistic boy. He is Hiro and Ichigo's childhood friend. He has been in love with Ichigo since childhood when she helped defend him from bullies. However, he keeps this to himself due to her feelings for Hiro. He is considered as the second unofficial leader of the squad and is more mature than the other boys. He is deeply concerned for Hiro when he pairs up with Zero Two but shows support for their relationship as Hiro began smiling after meeting her. After the final battle, he travels the world to gather supplies needed to help the parasites survive. Ten years later, Goro and Ichigo are married and expecting their first child.
Code:015 (コード:015, Kōdo:015) / Ichigo (イチゴ)
Voiced by: Kana Ichinose (Japanese); Brittany Lauda (English)
The emotionally blunt leader of Squad 13. She is Hiro and Goro’s childhood friend. She has been in love with Hiro since they were children when he named her. She is concerned with his well-being due to the risks involved in being Zero Two's partner. She later behaves jealously as Hiro and Zero Two become romantically involved, but fearing Zero Two will devour Hiro's humanity, she separates Zero Two from Hiro. She confesses her love to him but he rejects her and she realizes his mind and heart are so captivated by Zero Two that there is no space for her. After this, she recognizes the two's importance to each other, and accepts their relationship. After she is kissed by Goro, she ends up entering in a relationship with him. Ten years later, they are married and expecting their first child.

=== Pilots of Argentea ===
Argentea (アルジェンティア, Arujentia) is the Franxx piloted by Zorome and Miku. As a Franxx that specializes in close combat and speed, it is loaded with a fist claw type weapon called "Night Claw".

Code:666 (コード:666, Kōdo:666) / Zorome (ゾロメ)
Voiced by: Mutsumi Tamura (Japanese); Ryan Reynolds (English)
A loud, obnoxious, and somewhat lecherous boy. He greatly admires adults and aspires to become one someday. He has a disdain towards the "elites" with teen and single digit code numbers. He often argues with his partner, Miku, and serves as a comic relief for the squad. In the ten year timeskip, he and Miku become teachers for the new generation.
Code:390 (コード:390, Kōdo:390) / Miku (ミク)
Voiced by: Nanami Yamashita (Japanese); Bryn Apprill (English)
A loud, obnoxious, and direct girl. She is Kokoro’s childhood friend and Miku often clashes with her partner, Zorome, but cares deeply for him. While she is brash, she has a softer side and serves as a support system for her teammates. In the ten year timeskip, she and Zorome become teachers for the new generation.

=== Pilots of Genista ===
Genista (ジェニスタ, Jenisuta) is a heavy weapon Franxx originally piloted by Futoshi and Kokoro, until Futoshi and Mitsuru switch partners. It is covered with heavy armor and is loaded with a fist bayonet type artillery named "Rook Sparrow," which can cause great damage at close distances.

Code:326 (コード:326, Kōdo:326) / Mitsuru (ミツル)
Voiced by: Aoi Ichikawa, Saori Hayami (childhood) (Japanese); Bryson Baugus, Emily Neves (childhood) (English)
A quiet but cynical boy who has been with Hiro, Ichigo and Goro since childhood. He underwent a special, risky procedure to increase his abilities as a Parasite, but becomes disheartened upon knowing that Hiro forgot his promise to pilot a Franxx with him, unaware that Hiro's memories were erased. After discovering the truth, he became friendlier towards Hiro and the others. Later on he developed feelings for Kokoro and they began a romantic relationship. They got married but were captured by the APE and their memories of each other was altered. Mitsuru later learns Kokoro is pregnant with his child and he admits he wants her to keep the baby, to the point he gives up being a parasite to be a father to their child and he says she and their child are his reason to live. They reconcile and become a couple again. Their daughter, Ai, is later born. In the ten year timeskip, they are still happily married and have four children.
Code:556 (コード:556, Kōdo:556) / Kokoro (ココロ)
Voiced by: Saori Hayami (Japanese); Jeannie Tirado (English)
A meek yet kind-hearted girl who enjoys tending to the greenhouse in the Birdcage. After finding a baby book, she becomes fascinated with it and yearns to have a child to leave a mark for the future before she dies. She gets close to Mitsuru upon knowing his suffering and decides to become his partner. She falls in love with him and the two eventually began a romantic relationship and got married. Their memories of each other were erased by APE after being captured during their wedding. Kokoro later discovers she is pregnant and is faced with the choice of having an abortion or keeping the baby and lose her place as a parasite. However, hearing Mitsuru say he wants her to keep the baby and rebuild their relationship, they reconcile and become a couple again. She later gives birth to a girl named Ai. In the ten year timeskip, they are still happily married and have four children.

=== Pilots of Chlorophytum ===
Chlorophytum (クロロフィッツ, Kurorofittsu) is a support type Franxx for long distance attacks originally piloted by Mitsuru and Ikuno, until Futoshi and Mitsuru switch partners. Its arms are equipped with the heat sink called "Wing Span."

Code:214 (コード:214, Kōdo:214) / Futoshi (フトシ)
Voiced by: Hiroki Gotō (Japanese); Blake Shepard (English)
A portly and kind boy, who eats constantly and is infatuated with his partner, Kokoro. He sees himself as her protector and wishes for her to be his partner forever. However, he gets devastated once Kokoro decides to become Mitsuru's partner instead. Although initially jealous of Mitsuru because of this, he accepts their relationship because he wishes to see them happy and he even acts as the priest at their wedding. In the ten year timeskip, he becomes a baker. He marries and has two children with a third on the way.
Code:196 (コード:196, Kōdo:196) / Ikuno (イクノ)
Voiced by: Shizuka Ishigami (Japanese); Leah Clark (English)
A calm and insightful girl. She is the best friend of Ichigo and is one-sided in love with her. She used to be partners with Mitsuru, with whom she had a tumultuous partnership due to their mutual dislike of each other. After their synchronization is lost, she is paired with Futoshi. She later confesses her feelings to Ichigo but admits how shameful she feels about being attracted to girls and Ichigo comforts her. After the VIRM invades the planet, Ikuno overuses her strength and this permanently damages her health, including turning her hair white. In the final episodes she later works as a doctor and develops a cure for the accelerated aging process of the parasites, allowing them to properly grow into adults but is bedridden and sickly due to her keeping her accelerated aging process.

== APE ==
APE is the organization that rules over the Plantations, the last bastions of humanity. The Seven Sages of APE are heavily worshipped as deities by humanity.

Nana (ナナ)
Voiced by: Marina Inoue (Japanese); Michelle Rojas (English)
APE combat headquarters' parasite manager. She is in charge of the parasites in Mistilteinn and acts as a surrogate mother to them, as she has cared for them since infancy. However, she is strict with them and is capable of making difficult decisions about them. In the past, she was in a relationship with her partner but her memories were erased due to her despair after his death. She is set aside when she experiences repressed puberty but is brought back to look after the children following Dr. Franxx’s death.
Hachi (ハチ)
Voiced by: Katsuyuki Konishi (Japanese); Eric Vale (English)
APE combat headquarters' defense operation commander who oversees Squad 13 along with Nana. He is stoic and blunt with the parasites, and takes his duties serious. However, he truly cares about the parasites and helps look after them. In the past, he was a member of the same squad as Nana and seems to have feelings for her despite his lack of emotions.
Dr. Franxx (フランクス博士, Furankusu Hakase) / Werner Frank (ヴェルナー・フランク, Verunā Furanku)
Voiced by: Kenyuu Horiuchi (Japanese); Kent Williams (English)
Real name Werner Frank. He is a cyborg-human scientist who developed the Franxx units. He also is credited for the creation of the parasites via his cloning research. In the past, he was infamous for his unethical experiments with cloning but it earned him a partnership with APE. Although he is infatuated with the beauty of his work, he is curious of the previous civilization customs, and hastily arranged Squad 13 to serve as an experimental unit for that purpose. He created Zero Two and subjected her to torturous experiments. He is very concerned about the klaxosaurs and believes that Hiro and Zero Two's partnership have a key role in defeating them. He is killed during the battle between the klaxosaurs and VIRM but not before reconciling with Zero Two in episode 21.
Papa (パパ)
Voiced by: Nobuo Tobita (Japanese); Christopher R. Sabat (English)
The chairman of APE. He is the leader of Seven Sages and is publicly regarded as a god. All of humanity is loyal and obedient towards him, but fear him due to the severe consequences should any rule of APE’s be broken. He oversees the development and actions of all the parasites, and all decisions related to their health and upbringing are left up to him. He is later revealed to be the leader of an alien race known as VIRM, the true antagonists of the series which invaded Earth many eons ago. To overthrow the Klaxosaur Princess and kill the parasites, he sends VIRM to try to destroy them and absorb their souls. Papa goes as far as to demand the surviving members of humanity to merge with VIRM to eliminate further discrimination and hatred, but everyone rejects this. He is seemingly destroyed when Strelizia True Apus destroys VIRM's fleet near Mars, but returns in the final episode near VIRM's home planet, using his powers to disrupt Hiro's connection with Zero Two. VIRM loses the battle and their planet is destroyed, releasing the souls assimilated into VIRM throughout time to return to their bodies. However, Papa and the Vice Chairman survive and vow that VIRM will return one day at the peak of evolution.
Vice Chairman
Voiced by: Mitsuo Yokoi (Japanese); Brian Mathis (English)
The vice chairman of APE and second in-command of Seven Sages, next to Papa. He is revealed to be an alien called VIRM just like Papa.
007 / Nana (Newly Appointed) (新ナナ, Shin Nana; New Nana)
Voiced by: Shizuka Ito (Japanese); Kristen McGuire (English)
A woman appointed to oversee Squad 13 after the original Nana is set aside. Unlike the original Nana, she does not display any concern or compassion towards the Parasites. She later takes on a caretaker role alongside Hachi and the original Nana in assisting the new society built by the surviving Parasites.

== The Five Sages ==
The five supreme commanders of the human dominion organization, APE. They wear white clothes and metal masks, and are led by an individual called "Papa" (パパ).

Character	Japanese voice actor	English dubbing actor
Marmoset	Makoto Furukawa	Casey Casper
Baboon	Makoto Furukawa; Tessho Genda	David Wald
Gorilla	Makoto Furukawa; Tessho Genda	Ray Hurd
Lemur	Makoto Furukawa; Tessho Genda	Randy Pearlman
Tarsier	Makoto Furukawa; Tessho Genda	Aaron Roberts

== Nines ==
Nines is a special and defense force directly subordinate to APE and Zero Two's former unit, which originally appeared as a result of attempts to create functional pairs from her DNA. In their pairs, pistils and stamens change places, which together with their "genderness" means them as an alternative to traditional heterosexual relationships in other pairs. In this regard, all members of the squad have an underlined androgynous appearance and fundamentally avoid any gender roles in their behavior.

9'α (ナインアルファ, Nain Arufa; Nine Alpha)
Voiced by: Sōma Saitō (Japanese); Justin Briner (English)
The narcissistic and mischievous leader of the Nines. He often smiles but he is brutally honest and lacks empathy for others but his unit. He is interested in Hiro for being the sole partner to survive riding with Zero Two. He is also interested in Ichigo for her pride and dignity. He believes that humans don't need either genders or emotions, and finds procreation to be repulsive. He is fiercely loyal to Papa and looks down upon Squad 13, to the point he causes trouble for them to disrupt their happiness and form a rift with Zero Two. When Papa reveals his true identity and betrays everyone by trying to kill them, Alpha becomes ill due to “lack of maintenance” and begins to question Papa’s intentions. He decides to aid Squad 13 in the final battle against VIRM and sacrifices himself to save Hiro, whom he credits for teaching him what it means to be human.
9'β (ナインベータ, Nain Bēta; Nine Beta)
Voiced by: Toshiki Masuda (Japanese); Daman Mills (English)
A stamen who serves in Nines. He dies in the galactic battle with VIRM in episode 23.
9'γ (ナインガンマ, Nain Ganma; Nine Gamma)
Voiced by: Takuya Eguchi (Japanese); Ricco Fajardo (English)
A stamen who serves in Nines. He dies in the galactic battle against VIRM in episode 23.
9'δ (ナインデルタ, Nain Deruta; Nine Delta)
Voiced by: Ayane Sakura (Japanese); Alexis Tipton (English)
A pistil who serves in Nines. She is the only girl in the squad who participates in the story besides the boys. She and her partner, Epsilon, are killed by VIRM in episode 21.
9'ε (ナインイプシロン, Nain Ipushiron; Nine Epsilon)
Voiced by: Atsushi Tamaru (Japanese); Alejandro Saab (English)
A stamen who serves in Nines. He and Delta are killed by VIRM in episode 21.
9'ζ (ナインゼータ, Nain Zēta; Nine Zeta)
A pistil who serves in Nines. She is Alpha’s partner. She dies from lack of maintenance after the battle in episode 21.
9'η (ナインエータ, Nain Ēta; Nine Eta)
A pistil who serves in Nines. She is Beta’s partner. She dies in episode 23.
9'θ (ナインテータ, Nain Tēta; Nine Theta)
A pistil who serves in Nines. She is Gamma’s partner. She dies in episode 23.

== Other characters ==
Code:703 (コード:703, Kōdo:703) / Naomi (ナオミ)
Voiced by: Ami Koshimizu (Japanese); Megan Shipman (English)
Hiro's former partner who was hospitalized after a klaxosaur attack in which she loses an arm. After disbanding from Hiro, she was said to have disappeared. In episode 22, it is revealed she has been kept in a cryogenic state along with other children deemed unfit to pilot, looked after by Dr. Franxx. She is later released and is shown taking care of an aging Ikuno at the end of the series.
Code:081 (コード:081, Kōdo:081)
Voiced by: Takanori Hoshino (Japanese); Jeff Johnson (English)
Zero Two's former partner who is killed in a klaxosaur attack.
Code:090 (コード:090, Kōdo:090)
Voiced by: Makoto Furukawa (Japanese); Josh Grelle (English)
The squad leader of Plantation 26. He lost his former partner two years ago because of Zero Two's poor combat composure. Because of this, he holds a deep grudge towards Zero Two. He and his squad die in a suicide attack in an attempt to stop a Lehmann class Klaxosaur that destroyed their Plantation.
The Woman (オトナ 女性, Otona Josei)
Voiced by: Kikuko Inoue (Japanese); Linda Leonard (English)
The woman who rescues and tends to Zorome after he gets lost in the city. He senses a familiarity with her but the exact nature of their relationship is unknown. Based on their identical eye color and her behavior towards him, it is speculated she is biologically related to him.
Karina Milsa (カリナ・ミルザ, Karina Miruza)
Voiced by: Yuuko Kaida (Japanese); Stephanie Young (English)
A scientist who discovers a way to regenerate telomeres (thought to cause aging by modern scientists). She was Dr. Franxx's past fiancée and greatly admired him. She was involved in his research of the Franxx and immortality. She died in an accident in 2042 while first testing the prototype Franxx and reproductive procedures.
Ai (アイ)
Voiced by: Saya Hirose (Japanese); Emily Fajardo (English)
Kokoro and Mitsuru's daughter. She is the first natural child to be born to parasites. She is a cheerful and precocious child, and is loved dearly by her parents.
Code:001 (コード:001, Kōdo:001)
Voiced by: Rie Kugimiya (Japanese); Luci Christian (English)
The Princess of the Klaxosaurs and last of the Klaxo Sapien race. Many eons ago, her people refused a peace talk with VIRM to surrender their souls, leading to an intergalactic war and extinction. They hide underground to prepare for a final battle against VIRM, until humanity discovers magma energy and begins excavating it, prompting her and the klaxosaurs to invade the Plantations. She's the one who ripped Dr. Franxx's arm off when the latter was sent to meet with her by APE. In the final battle between the klaxosaurs and humanity, the Klaxosaur Princess forcibly links with Hiro and steals Strelitzia for use, to Zero Two's dismay. After being caught in a deadly trap set by Papa, she transfers her remaining energy to Hiro and Zero Two to intercept VIRM and bring peace to Earth, deciding to put her faith in humanity to save Earth from VIRM.
