= Shizuru =

- Gender: Female

Origin
- Origin: Japanese
- Meaning: Different meanings depending on the kanji used

Shizuru (written: 静流 or 志弦) is a feminine Japanese given name. Notable people with the name include:

- Shizuru Hayashiya (林家 志弦), Japanese manga artist
- Shizuru Seino (清野 静流; born 1976), Japanese manga artist

== Fictional characters ==
- Shizuru Fujino (藤乃 静留), a character in the anime series My-HiME
- Shizuru Hibara (檜原 静流), a character in the manga series Mokke
- Shizuru Imawano (忌野 静流), a character in the manga series Ga-Rei
- Shizuru Kamura (禿羅 志鶴), a character in the manga series Tenjho Tenge
- Shizuru Kuwabara (桑原 静流), a character in the manga series Yu Yu Hakusho
- Shizuru Migiwa (汀 紫鶴), a character in the visual novel Nil Admirari no Tenbin: Teito Genwaku Kitan
- Shizuru Taneomi (種臣 静流), a character in the anime series BBK/BRNK
