= Alexis Tipton =

American voice actress

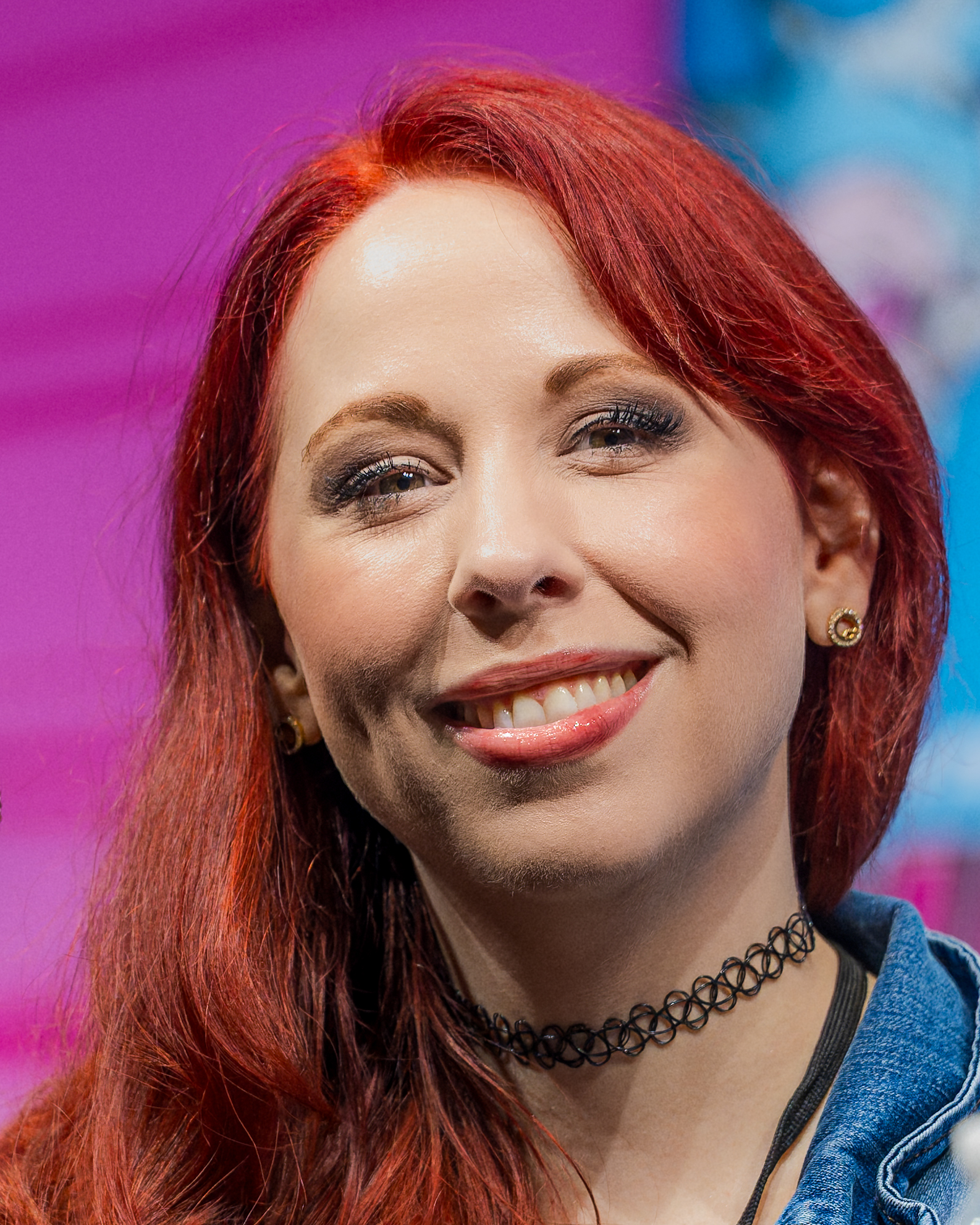
- Tipton at Animate! Orlando in 2026
- Born: August 11, 1989 (age 37); Wichita, Kansas, U.S.
- Education: Texas Tech University; University of North Texas (BA)
- Occupations: Voice actress; ADR director
- Years active: 2008–present
- Website: www.alexistipton.com

Alexis Tipton (born August 11, 1989) is an American voice actress and ADR director. She has provided voices for English-language versions of anime series, films and video games, primarily for Crunchyroll. Some of her roles include Sun Seto in My Bride Is a Mermaid, Musubi in Sekirei, Reze in Chainsaw Man and Chainsaw Man - The Movie: Reze Arc, Yomi Isayama in Ga-Rei: Zero, Mizuki Himeji in Baka and Test, Millianna in Fairy Tail, Moka Akashiya in Rosario + Vampire, Saya Kisaragi in Blood-C, Rika Shiguma in Haganai, Amelia Rose in The Iceblade Sorcerer Shall Rule the World, Honey in Space Dandy, Yuki Funahara in Psycho-Pass, Irina Avalon in Aokana: Four Rhythms Across the Blue, Feles in Estab Life, Mina Carolina in Attack on Titan, Kurumi Tokisaki in Date A Live, Kofuku in Noragami, Lupusregina Beta in Overlord, Kid Trunks in Dragon Ball Super, Mei Hatsume in My Hero Academia, and Kaguya Shinomiya in Kaguya-sama: Love Is War.

In video games, she voices Lucina in Fire Emblem, Sunna in Zenless Zone Zero, Pascal in Nier: Automata, Minerva Victor in Valkyria Chronicles 4, Musse Egret in The Legend of Heroes and Odette in Genshin Impact.

== Filmography ==
=== Film ===
List of voice performances in feature films
Year	Title	Role	Notes	Source
2019	Dragon Ball Super: Broly	Trunks		
2022	Sing a Bit of Harmony	Aya		
2025	Chainsaw Man – The Movie: Reze Arc	Reze		

=== Direct-to-video films ===
List of voice performances in direct-to-video and television films
Year	Title	Role	Notes	Source
2012	Fullmetal Alchemist: The Sacred Star of Milos	Julia Crichton		
2012	King of Thorn	Shizuku Ishiki		
2013	Wolf Children	Sōko		
2013	Blood-C: The Last Dark	Saya Kisaragi		Resume
2016	Strike Witches: The Movie	Martina Crespi		
2024	Digimon Adventure: Our War Game!	Additional Voices		
2024	Digimon Adventure 02: Digimon Hurricane Touchdown!! / Transcendent Evolution! The Golden Digimentals	Little Boy 3C, Additional Voices		

=== Anime ===
List of voice performances in anime
Year	Title	Role	Notes	Source
2009	Bamboo Blade	Yuri Ando		Resume
2009	Kaze no Stigma	Mie Sugino	Ep. 17	
2010	Linebarrels of Iron	Emi Kizaki		Resume
2010	My Bride is a Mermaid	Sun Seto		Resume
2010	Master of Martial Hearts	Miko Kazuki		
2010	Casshern Sins	Niko		Facebook
2010	Corpse Princess	Flesh Backbone		Facebook
2010	Sekirei	Musubi, Yume	Also Pure Engagement in 2012	
2010–14	Hetalia: Axis Powers	Kumajiro; Little Japan; Female Japan (Nyotalia)		Facebook
2011	The Sacred Blacksmith	Charlotte E. Firobisher		Resume
2011	Hero Tales	Laila Seiren		
2011	Ga-Rei: Zero	Yomi Isayama	Also Tokyo ESP in 2016	Resume
2011	Dance in the Vampire Bund	Yuki Saegusa		Resume
2011	Rideback	Megumi Kamiyama	Ep. 1	
2011	Rosario + Vampire	Moka Akashiya	2 seasons	
2011–12	Black Butler	Queen Victoria (Young), Jill Peasant		Facebook
2011–13	Baka and Test	Mizuki Himeji		
2011–19	Fairy Tail	Millianna		Facebook
2012	B Gata H Kei: Yamada's First Time	Yamada's Eros-Deity		
2012	Princess Jellyfish	Kuranosuke Koibuchi (Young)		Facebook
2012	Ōkami-san and her Seven Companions	Suzume Shitagiri		
2012	The Legend of the Legendary Heroes	Eslina Folkel		Facebook
2012	Shiki	Kaori Tanaka		
2012–19	A Certain Magical Index	Hyoka Kazakiri	3 seasons	
2013	Blood-C	Saya Kisaragi		
2013	Tenchi Muyo! War on Geminar	Lapis Larz		
2013	Guilty Crown	Inori Yuzuriha, Mana Ouma		
2013	Last Exile: Fam, the Silver Wing	Cecily		
2013	Robotics;Notes	Hayakawa		
2013	Aquarion Evol	Mix	Also Genesis of Aquarion Love in 2016	
2013	Aesthetica of a Rogue Hero	Haruka Nanase		
2013–14	Haganai series	Rika Shiguma	2 seasons	
2013; 2016	Maken-ki!	Kimi Sato	2 seasons	
2013–present	One Piece	Fukurou, Vinsmoke Reiju		Resume
2014	Space Dandy	Honey		
2014	Psycho-Pass	Yuki Funahara		Facebook
2014	Attack on Titan	Mina Carolina	Also Junior High in 2015	
2014	Senran Kagura	Ikaruga		
2014–15	Kamisama Kiss	Ami Nekota	2 seasons	
2014–present	Date A Live series	Kurumi Tokisaki		
2015	The Rolling Girls	Mamechiyo		Facebook
2015	World Break: Aria of Curse for a Holy Swordsman	Sofia Mertesacker		
2015	Unbreakable Machine-Doll	Irori		
2015	Yurikuma Arashi	Kureha Tsubaki		
2015	Yona of the Dawn	Yuno	Ep. 16	Tweet
2015	Maria the Virgin Witch	Maria		
2015	D-Frag!	Fukuko Nishinaga	Ep. 12	
2015	Seraph of the End	Kōta Hyakuya, Mahiru Hīragi		
2015	Ninja Slayer From Animation	Asari		
2015	Nobunagun	Galileo Galilei		Resume
2015	Show by Rock!!	Chuchu		
2015	Mikagura School Suite	Mewmirin		
2015	Michiko & Hatchin	Bebel Feng-Yi		Facebook
2015	BlazBlue Alter Memory	Platinum the Trinity		
2015	Noragami	Kofuku	Also Aragoto	
2015	Soul Eater Not!	Anya Hepburn		
2015	Sky Wizards Academy	Sasha Nielsen	Ep. 8	
2015	Gangsta	Loretta Cristiano Amodio		Tweet
2015	Prison School	Hana Midorikawa		
2015	Shomin Sample	Maya Mibu		
2015	Heavy Object	Milinda Brantini		
2015	Dragonar Academy	Rebecca Randall		
2015	Riddle Story of Devil	Haru Ichinose		
2015–16	Selector Infected WIXOSS series	Mayu	Also spread	Resume
2015–18	Overlord	Lupusregina Beta	Assistant ADR director (season 2)	
2016	Snow White with the Red Hair	Rona Shenazard		Tweet
2016	Divine Gate	Midori		
2016	No-Rin	Alegssis	Ep. 6	
2016	Dimension W	Sophia Tyler	Ep. 9	
2016	Rage of Bahamut: Genesis	Gabriel		Tweet
2016	Garo: The Animation	Irene	Ep. 8	
2016	Three Leaves, Three Colors	Yōko Nishikawa		
2016	Handa-kun	Yōko Ikeuchi	Eps. 2–4, 7–12	
2016	Puzzle & Dragons X	Tamazō		
2016	Love Live! Sunshine!!	—N/a	Assistant director	
2016	Tales of Zestiria the X	Alisha Diphda		
2016	Danganronpa 3: The End of Hope's Peak High School	Komaru Naegi	Both Future Arc and Hope Arc	
2016	The Vision of Escaflowne	Merle	Funimation dub	
2016	Yuri on Ice	Yūko Nishigōri		
2016	Keijo!!!!!!!!	Kazane Aoba		
2016	ReLIFE	Rena Kariu		
2016	Touken Ranbu: Hanamaru	Midare Tōshirō	Ep. 2	
2016	Chaos Dragon	Ulrika Ledesma		
2016	Castle Town Dandelion	Sachiko Yonezawa		
2016	Aquarion Logos	Kokone Kikogami		
2016	Bikini Warriors	Paladin		
2016	Rampo Kitan: Game of Laplace	Hoshino	Ep. 2	
2017	Dragon Ball Z Kai	Erasa; Gotenks (Trunks-half); West Supreme Kai		
2017	ACCA: 13-Territory Inspection Dept.	Lotta Otus		
2017	ēlDLIVE	Nina Mikhailovna Pavlova	Ep. 6	
2017	Masamune-kun's Revenge	Aki Adagaki (Young)	ADR director Solo directorial debut	
2017	Chain Chronicle: The Light of Haecceitas	Veinta		
2017	Luck & Logic	Athena		
2017	Valkyrie Drive: Mermaid	Hibiki Kenjō		
2017	Akashic Records of Bastard Magic Instructor	Sara Silver		
2017	WorldEnd	Nephren Ruq Insania	ADR director	
2017	Sakura Quest	Yoshino Koharu		
2017	Hyouka	Fuyumi Irisu		
2017	18if	Lily		Tweet
2017	Restaurant to Another World	—N/a	ADR director	
2017	KanColle: Kantai Collection	Kongō		
2017	In Another World With My Smartphone	Charlotte	Ep. 4	
2017	Knight's & Magic	Ernesti Echavellia (Child)		
2017	King's Game The Animation	Chiemi Honda		
2017	Blood Blockade Battlefront	Neyka	Season 2	
2017	Dies irae	Beatrice von Kircheisen		
2017	Urahara	Mari Shirako		
2017	Tsuredure Children	Ayane Matsuura		
2017	Taboo Tattoo	Yumi	Ep. 10	
2017	Hundred	Nakri Olfred		
2017	Myriad Colors Phantom World	Ayumi Kitajima	Ep. 9	
2017–19	Dragon Ball Super	Kid Trunks, Gotenks		
2017–25	My Hero Academia	Mei Hatsume		
2018	Yamada-kun and the Seven Witches	Noa Takigawa		
2018	Junji Ito Collection	Riko Tokura	Ep. 5b	
2018	Katana Maidens ~ Toji No Miko	Erin Kohagura		
2018	Death March to the Parallel World Rhapsody	Nadi	Ep. 6	
2018	Hakyu Hoshin Engi	So Dakki		
2018	Basilisk: The Ōka Ninja Scrolls	Narrator		
2018	Cardcaptor Sakura: Clear Card	Nakuru Akizuki / Ruby Moon	Assistant ADR director (Ep. 19)	
2018	Pop Team Epic	Popuko	Ep. 9	
2018	Steins;Gate 0	Kagari Shīna	Assistant ADR director (Ep. 12)	
2018	Ace Attorney	Pearl Fey		Tweet
2018	Darling in the Franxx	9'δ (Nine Delta)		
2018	Kakuriyo no Yadomeshi	Suzuran		
2018	Aokana: Four Rhythm Across the Blue	Irina Avalon		Tweet
2018	Zombie Land Saga	Ukawa	Ep. 9	
2018	Conception	—N/a	ADR director	
2019	Magical Girl Spec-Ops Asuka	Chisato Yonamine	ADR director	
2019	Endro!	Elnowar "Seira" Seiran		
2019	My Roommate Is a Cat	Nana Ōkami		
2019	Boogiepop and Others	Noriko Hazuki	Ep. 14	
2019	Million Arthur	Danchō Arthur		
2019	Fire Force	Iris		
2019	How Heavy Are the Dumbbells You Lift?	Gina Boyd	Assistant ADR co-director	
2019	Kemono Friends	Fennec		
2019	Azur Lane	Unicorn, Hiryū		
2019	After School Dice Club	Miki Takekasa		
2020	Toilet-Bound Hanako-kun	Yako		
2020	Darwin's Game	Karino Shuka		
2020	Plunderer	Mizuka Sonohara		
2020	To Love Ru	Lala Satalin Deviluke		
2020–22	Kaguya-sama: Love Is War	Kaguya Shinomiya		
2021	Gleipnir	Honoka		
2021	Sleepy Princess in the Demon Castle	—N/a	Assistant ADR director	
2021	Suppose a Kid from the Last Dungeon Boonies Moved to a Starter Town	Selen		
2021	Adachi and Shimamura	Tarumi		
2021	Back Arrow	Elsha Lean		
2021	Dragon Goes House-Hunting	—N/a	ADR director	
2021	Vinland Saga	Hordaland, Faxi	Sentai Filmworks dub	
2021	Moriarty the Patriot	Madame Penieres		
2021	The Case Study of Vanitas	Dominique de Sade		
2021	Banished from the Hero's Party, I Decided to Live a Quiet Life in the Countryside	Yarandrala	2 seasons	
2021	Mieruko-chan	Miko	Assistant ADR director	
2021–present	That Time I Got Reincarnated as a Slime	Hinata Sakaguchi	Season 2 onwards	
2022	Girls' Frontline	ST AR-15		
2022	The Genius Prince's Guide to Raising a Nation Out of Debt	Lowellmina		
2022	Estab Life: Great Escape	Feles		
2022	Takt Op. Destiny	Anna Schneider		
2022	Black Summoner	Sera		
2022	Natsume's Book of Friends	Reiko Natsume		
2022	I'm the Villainess, So I'm Taming the Final Boss	Aileen		
2022	Raven of the Inner Palace	Shouxue		
2022	The Devil Is a Part-Timer!	Rika Suzuki	Season 2	
2023	Chainsaw Man	Reze		
2023	Mobile Suit Gundam: The Witch from Mercury	Felsi		
2023	Nier: Automata Ver1.1a	Pascal		
2023	The Ancient Magus' Bride	Veronica Rickenbacker		
2023	The Legendary Hero Is Dead!	Yuna		
2023	The Kingdoms of Ruin	Doroka		
2023–present	The Iceblade Sorcerer Shall Rule the World	Amelia Rose		
2024	The Wrong Way to Use Healing Magic	Suzune Inukami / Suzune		
2024	Makeine: Too Many Losing Heroines!	Karen		
2024	No Longer Allowed in Another World	Annette		
2025	Zenshu	Memerun		
2025	Dragon Ball Daima	Trunks, Gotenks		
2025	Dr. Stone: Science Future	Luna Wright		
2025	Detective Conan	Ai Haibara / Shiho Miyano		
2025	To Be Hero X	Wang Nuonuo		
2026	Overgeared	Irene		

=== Other dubbing ===
List of voice performances in other dubbing
Year	Title	Role	Notes	Source
2016	Rurouni Kenshin: Origins	Kamiya Kaoru		
2016	Rurouni Kenshin: Kyoto Inferno	Kamiya Kaoru		
2017	Rurouni Kenshin: The Legend Ends	Kamiya Kaoru		

=== Video games ===
List of voice performances in video games
Year	Title	Role	Notes	Source
2011	The Gunstringer	Additional Voices		
2012	Borderlands 2	Molly Barrow, Tamara Freeborn, Generic Female #2		Resume
2015	Dragon Ball: Xenoverse	Gotenks (Trunks-half)		Resume
2015	Lord of Magna: Maiden Heaven	Beatrix, Sarina		Tweet
2015	Tales of Zestiria	Alisha Diphda		Resume
2015	Stella Glow	Bubu, Rena, Kaede		Tweet
2015	Xenoblade Chronicles X	Hope		
2016	Dragon Ball Xenoverse 2	Gotenks (Trunks-half)		
2017	Fire Emblem Heroes	Lucina, Clair, Palla	Roles shared with Laura Bailey	
2017	Nier: Automata	Pascal		
2017	Akiba's Beat	Hazuki Aihara, Moe Suzumori		
2017	Fire Emblem Echoes: Shadows of Valentia	Clair, Palla		
2018	Dragon Ball FighterZ	Kid Trunks, Gotenks		
2018	BlazBlue: Cross Tag Battle	Platinum the Trinity		
2018	Valkyria Chronicles 4	Minerva Victor	Uncredited	
2018	Dragon Ball Legends	Kid Trunks, Gotenks		
2019	The Legend of Heroes: Trails of Cold Steel III	Musse Egret		Tweet
2020	Dragon Ball Z: Kakarot	Kid Trunks, Gotenks, Erasa		
2020	The Legend of Heroes: Trails of Cold Steel IV	Musse Egret, Sully Atraid		
2021	Akiba's Trip: Hellbound & Debriefed	Additional Voices		
2022	Rune Factory 5	Radea		
2022	Goddess of Victory: Nikke	Yan, Yuni, Pascal	Credited in-game	
2022	RWBY Arrowfell	Bianca Prisma		
2023	Fire Emblem Engage	Lucina		
2023	The Legend of Heroes: Trails into Reverie	Musse Egret, Sully Atraid, Soldiers & Citizens of Zemuria		
2023	Honkai: Star Rail	Qingyue, Elaine, Pamela, Pascal		
2023	Tower of Fantasy	Huang		
2023	Disgaea 7: Vows of the Virtueless	Yayaka		
2024	Unicorn Overlord	Millé, Ridiel		
2024	Path to Nowhere	L.L.		
2025	Digimon Story: Time Stranger	Mirei Mikagura		
2026	Code Vein II	Iris MagMell		
2026	Zenless Zone Zero	Sunna	Self-announcement	Tweet
2026	Neverness to Everness	Haniel	Credited in-game	
2026	Genshin Impact	Odette		
