= Leah Clark =

American voice actress

- Clark at GalaxyCon San Jose in 2026
- Occupations: Voice actress; ADR director; ADR script writer
- Years active: 1999–present

Leah Clark is an American voice actress, ADR director and script writer. She has provided voices for Japanese anime series and video games. Some of her major roles include Mavis Vermillion in Fairy Tail, Suzuka Asahina in Suzuka, Saki Morimi in Eden of the East, Kagura Tsuchimiya in Ga-Rei: Zero, Eri Sawachika in School Rumble, Mio Naganohara in Nichijou, Blair in Soul Eater, Minami Shimada in Baka and Test, Kobayashi in Miss Kobayashi's Dragon Maid, Himiko Toga in My Hero Academia, and Noah in Fullmetal Alchemist the Movie.

== Personal life ==
Clark has post-traumatic stress syndrome & depression disorder.

== Filmography ==
=== Anime ===
List of voice performances and production work in anime
Year	Title	Role	Crew role, Notes	Source
2017	18if	Momoka Sakurai	Ep. 6	
2014	A Certain Magical Index II	Vasilisa		
2013	A Certain Scientific Railgun	Miho Jufuku	Eps. 3, 14	
2014	A Certain Scientific Railgun S	Frenda Seivelun		
2017	Akashic Records of Bastard Magic Instructor	Re=L Rayford		
2016	Alderamin on the Sky	Haroma Becker		
2012	Aria the Scarlet Ammo	Aria H. Kanzaki	Also Aria the Scarlet Ammo AA	
2015	Assassination Classroom	Yukiko Kanzaki	Also Koro-sensei Q!	
2012	B Gata H Kei Yamada's First Time	Kanejo's Eros Deity, others	Script Writer	
2009	Baccano!	Sylvie Lumiere		
2011–13	Baka and Test	Minami Shimada		
2009	Bamboo Blade	Miyako Miyazaki		
2016	Barakamon	Kentarō Ōhama		
2008	Black Blood Brothers	Kotaro Mochizuki		
2016	Chaos Dragon	Inori		
2011	Chrome Shelled Regios	Meyshen Torinden		
2017–present	Classroom of the Elite	Airi Sakura		
2008	Claymore	Noel		
2015	D-Frag!	Shinsen, Isle		
2015	Daimidaler: Prince vs Penguin Empire	Sewashiko Goya		
2018	Darling in the Franxx	Ikuno		
2008	Darker than Black	Mayu Otsuka		
2014–16	Date A Live series	Mai Hazakura		
2012	Deadman Wonderland	Minatsuki Takami		
2015	Death Parade	Mayu Arita		
2024	Delico's Nursery	Lucia Lorca		
2016	Divine Gate	Lisa		
2018	Dragon Ball Super	Ogma		
2003–05	Dragon Ball Z	Maron		
2015	Dragonar Academy	Orletta Blanc		
2010	Eden of the East	Saki Morimi		
2012	Fafner in the Azure: Heaven and Earth	Sakura Kaname		
2014–2019	Fairy Tail	Mavis Vermillion, Mio		
2019	Fairy Gone	Lily Heineman		
2016	Fairy Tail Zero	Mavis Vermillion		
2012	Freezing	Miyabi Kannazuki		
2019–2021	Fruits Basket	Megumi Hanajima, Takemura	2019 reboot	
2013	Future Diary	Murmur		
2011	Ga-Rei: Zero	Kagura Tsuchimiya	Also Tokyo ESP	
2008	Ghost Hunt	Naoko Suzuki	Eps. 18–19	
2016	Gonna be the Twin-Tail!!	Anko Isuna / Dark Grasper		
2013	Guilty Crown	Yu		
2007	Hell Girl	Junko Kanno, Yumi	Assistant ADR Director	
2018	High School DxD Hero	Asia Argento		
2017	Hina Logi ~from Luck & Logic~	Nina Alexandrovna		
2019	How Heavy Are the Dumbbells You Lift?	Satomi Tachibana	ADR Script Writer	
2018	How Not to Summon a Demon Lord	Sylvie		
2017	In Another World With My Smartphone	Elze Silhoueska		
2016	Izetta: The Last Witch	Elisabeth		
2018	Junji Ito Collection	Kana	Ep. 9	
2014	Kamisama Kiss	Koume	Ep. 5	
2017	KanColle: Kantai Collection	Yūdachi		
2009	Kaze no Stigma	Tsui-Ling		
2016	Keijo!!!!!!!!	Ayako Sakashiro		
2019	Kemono Michi	Misha		
2009	Kenichi: The Mightiest Disciple	Chihiro Takashima		
2017	Konohana Kitan	Kozue		
2013	Last Exile: Fam, the Silver Wing	Gieslle Collette Vignt		
2012	Level E	Taiyo Akagawa / Red Ranger		
2013	Lupin the Third: The Woman Called Fujiko Mine	Angelica	Ep. 6	
2015	Maria the Virgin Witch	Ezekiel		
2010	Master of Martial Hearts		ADR Script Writer	
2017	Miss Kobayashi's Dragon Maid	Kobayashi		
2017	Monster Hunter Stories: Ride On	Pansy		
2007	Mushishi	Michihi, others	Assistant ADR Director	
2017–2024	My Hero Academia	Himiko Toga		
2009	Nabari no Ou	Hanabusa Seki	ADR Script Writer (Eps. 3–5, 8–9)	
2024	Natsume's Book of Friends	Aiko		
2008	Negima!	Nodoka Miyazaki	Also Negima!?	
2017	New Game!	Yun Ījima		
2019	Nichijou	Mio Naganohara		
2015	Noragami series	Mayu		
2010	Oh! Edo Rocket	Tenho		
2012	Okami-san and her Seven Companions	Rokuro Shirayuki, Reiko Kokonoo	Eps. 9–10 (Rokuro Shirayuki); Eps. 10–12 (Reiko Kokonoo)	
2008–present	One Piece	Young Coby, Paula, others	ADR Script Writer; Theme song performance ("You Got Me", "Fish") (Funimation dub)	
2008	Ouran High School Host Club	Seika Ayanokoji		
2016	Pandora in the Crimson Shell: Ghost Urn	Bunny		
2012	Panty & Stocking with Garterbelt	Barby	ADR Script Writer	
2007	Peach Girl	Kako, Yoko	ADR Script	
2011	Pokémon: Black & White	Doyle	Ep. 35	
2018	Pop Team Epic	Pipimi	Ep. 8a	
2012	Princess Jellyfish	Jiji		
2016	Rage of Bahamut: Genesis	Cerberus		
2009–21	Rebuild of Evangelion series	Hikari Horaki		
2014	Red Data Girl	Jean Honoka Kisaragi		
2010	Rin: Daughters of Mnemosyne	Yoshie Shimizu (Young), Hanna	Credited as Lauryn Clarkson; Ep. 3 (Yoshie), Ep. 4 (Hanna)	
2014	Robotics;Notes	Frau Kojiro / Kona Furugori		
2011	Rosario + Vampire series	Rubi Tojo		
2006	Rumbling Hearts	Akane Suzumiya		
2017	Sakura Quest	Maki Midorikawa		
2017	Samurai Warriors	Lady Hayakawa		
2010	Sands of Destruction	Bel	Ep. 6	
2008	Sasami: Magical Girls Club	Asami, others	ADR Director; ADR Script Writer; 2 seasons	
2007	School Rumble series	Eri Sawachika	Assistant ADR Director	
2010	Sekirei series	Homura	ADR Script Writer	
2018	Senran Kagura: Shinovi Master	Shiki		
2015–16	Seraph of the End	Chihiro Hyakuya	Eps. 1–3, 6	
2009	Sgt. Frog	Fuyuki Hinata, Lavie		
2008–11	Shin-chan	Paris	Funimation dub	
2016	Shōnen Maid	Miyako Ōtori		
2016	Show by Rock!!#	Ailane		
2008	Shuffle!	Momiji Fuyo	ADR Director (Eps. 5–8)	
2010	Soul Eater	Blair		
2021	Sleepy Princess in the Demon Castle		Script Writer	
2009	Spice and Wolf	Nora Arendt		
2009	Strain: Strategic Armored Infantry	Lavinia Reberth	Assistant ADR Director (Eps. 1–5); ADR Director (Eps. 6–13)	
2010	Strike Witches		ADR Script Writer	
2007	Suzuka	Suzuka Asahina	Also Fūka; ADR Script Writer (Eps. 13–26)	
2018	Teasing Master Takagi-san	Mina Hibino	season 1	
2013	Tenchi Muyo! War on Geminar	Angela		
2017	The Ancient Magus' Bride	Beana	Ep. 3	
2015	The Rolling Girls	Chiaya Misono		
2010	The Sacred Blacksmith	Fio Atkins		
2009	The Tower of Druaga series	Ki, Neeba (Young)	ADR Director	
2016	Tōken Ranbu: Hanamaru	Gokotai		
2015	Tokyo Ghoul √A	Ruizawa	Ep. 7	
2015	Tokyo Ravens	Kyoko Kurahashi		
2012	Toriko	Rin		
2007	Tsubasa: Reservoir Chronicle	Kotoko		
2017	Tsugumomo	Kokuyō		
2015	Ultimate Otaku Teacher	Moemi Kushinada		
2018	Ulysses: Jeanne d'Arc and the Alchemist Knight	Astaroth		
2017	Valkyrie Drive: Mermaid	E9		
2015	Wanna Be the Strongest in the World	Misaki Toyoda		
2007	Witchblade	Satomi	Ep. 16	
2015	World Break: Aria of Curse for a Holy Swordsman	Arlene Highbury		
2017	WorldEnd	Rhantolk-Ytri-Historia		
2008	xxxHolic	Maru		
2016	Yuri!! on Ice	Mari Katsuki		
2015	Yurikuma Arashi	Choko Oki		
2025	Zenshu	Boy		

=== Film ===
List of voice performances in direct-to-video, feature and television films
Year	Title	Role	Crew role, Notes	Source
2009	Case Closed: Captured in Her Eyes	Sara Santos	ADR Director	
2010	Case Closed: The Phantom of Baker Street		ADR Director	
2006	Fullmetal Alchemist the Movie: Conqueror of Shamballa	Noah		
2020	My Hero Academia: Heroes Rising	Himiko Toga		
2011	Pokémon the Movie: Black—Victini and Reshiram and White—Victini and Zekrom	Carlita		
2016	Psycho-Pass: The Movie	Yeo		
2012	Tales of Vesperia: The First Strike	Chastel Aiheap		
2013	Wolf Children	Shino		

=== Video games ===
List of voice performances and production work in video games
Year	Title	Role	Crew role, Notes	Source
2012	Borderlands 2	Lindy Archman, Ellen Hayle, Felicia Sexopants, Mushy Snugglebites		
2014	Borderlands: The Pre-Sequel!	Tassiter's Secretary		
2009	Case Closed: The Mirapolis Investigation	Emily Hill		
2011	Dragon Ball Z: Ultimate Tenkaichi	Hero (Teenager)		
2011	Monster Tale	Deanu		
2014	Smite	Bastet		
