= Zero Two =

Fictional character in Darling in the Franxx

- Darling in the Franxx character
- Zero Two depicted in the Darling in the Franxx key visual
- First appearance: "Alone and Lonesomе" (2018)
- Created by: Code:000
- Designed by: Masayoshi Tanaka
- Voiced by: Japanese; Haruka Tomatsu; English; Tia Ballard

In-universe information
- Aliases: The Partner Killer; Code:002; Nine Iota
- Species: Klaxosaur (Can syncretize herself into a human gradually over time)
- Gender: Female
- Occupation: Special forces mecha pilot
- Spouses: Hiro 016
- Hair color: Pink
- Eye color: Green

Zero Two (Japanese: ゼロツー, Hepburn: Zero Tsū), also called Code:002 (コード:002, Kōdo:002) and 9'℩ (ナインイオタ, Nain Iota; "Nine Iota") is a fictional character in the Japanese anime television series Darling in the Franxx by A-1 Pictures, Trigger, and CloverWorks. She was designed as the most prominent character and icon of the series. Zero Two is an artificially-created life form who aspires to become fully human, and an elite pilot with an infamous reputation as the "Partner Killer". She is well known for addressing Hiro, the protagonist, by the eponymous term "darling".

== Creation and design ==
Concept art of Zero Two in her pilot suit

Zero Two had the most labor-intensive design process and was designed to be an iconic character to act as a flagship for Darling in the Franxx. The series' creative staff came to the consensus she should be the most eye-catching character. The inspiration for Zero Two's anime design came from character designer Masayoshi Tanaka and director Atsushi Nishigori. Tanaka explained that the design team was more concentrated on "what sort of existence Zero Two had", rather than her appearance, beginning with a vague image of a "badass transfer student". The initial design concepts of Zero Two were substantially subdued in comparison to her final appearance, appearing as a small, quiet, dark-haired character, before the design team decided that the design did not work with the intended personality. Her originally dark hair was exchanged for pink to assist in marketing her as the series' icon. Tanaka adapted the original design for the queen of the Klaxosaurs. The creative team considered their goal to make Zero Two an iconic character as a success, citing the abundance of cosplay and fanart. When asked by fans, Nishigori stated that Zero Two was his favorite character in the series but expressed that he was more "attracted to her charismatic personality" rather than her romantic appeal.

Zero Two is an elite pilot originally belonging to the special forces unit with an infamous reputation as the "Partner Killer" due to none of her previous co-pilots having survived past three rides. As an artificially-created hybrid between humans and Klaxo sapiens (a cybernetic dinosaur-like species which inhabited the Earth millions of years ago), she possesses superhuman abilities such as increased strength and rapid regeneration. Commonly viewed by others as a monster, Zero Two possesses bestial physical characteristics such as two small red horns and fangs. She began to pursue her ambition to become fully human after meeting the protagonist Hiro in her youth, and frequently questions the meaning of humanity. Zero Two has a confident and assertive personality, as well as being consistently rebellious towards the collectivist, quasi-theocratic world government depicted in the series.

As a child, she was significantly more bestial in nature with red skin, blue blood, longer horns, sharper teeth, and described as having eyes "filled with hatred for the world". Growing up, Zero Two took on a significantly more humanoid-like appearance, with red blood and light skin.

== Appearances ==
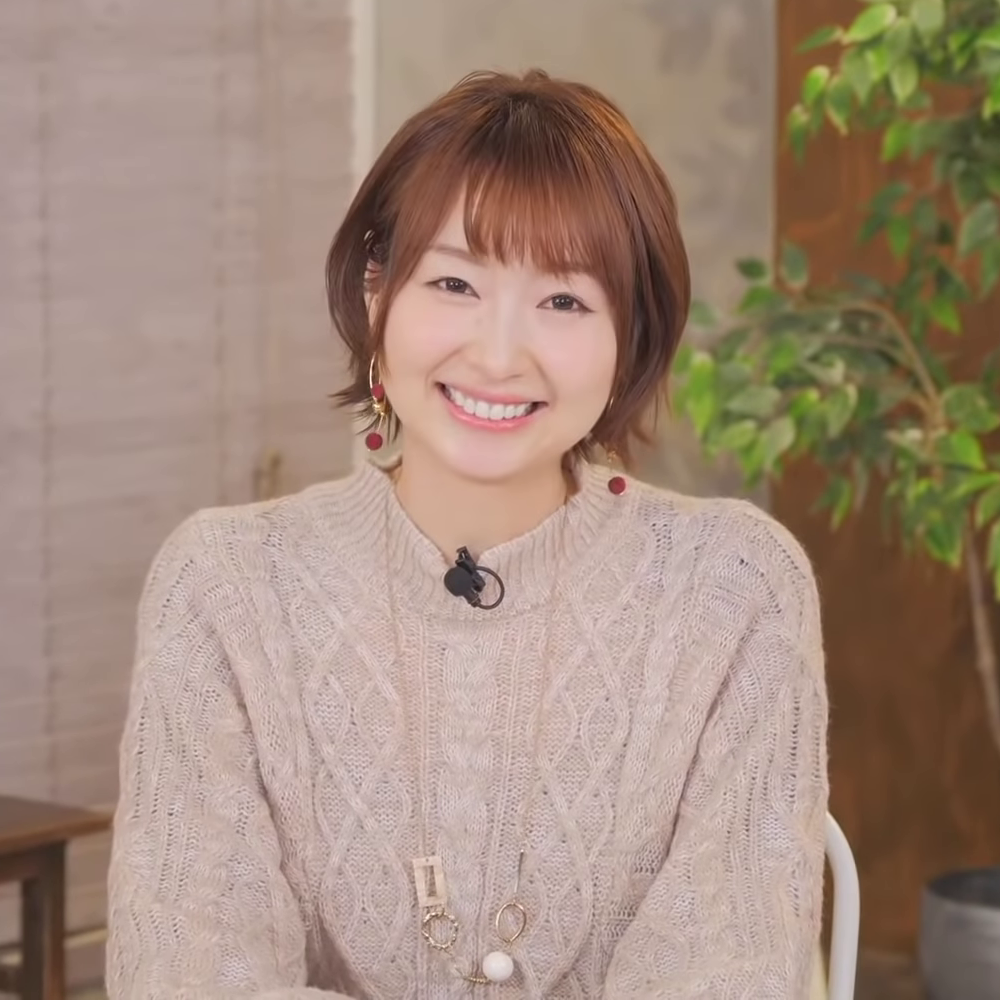
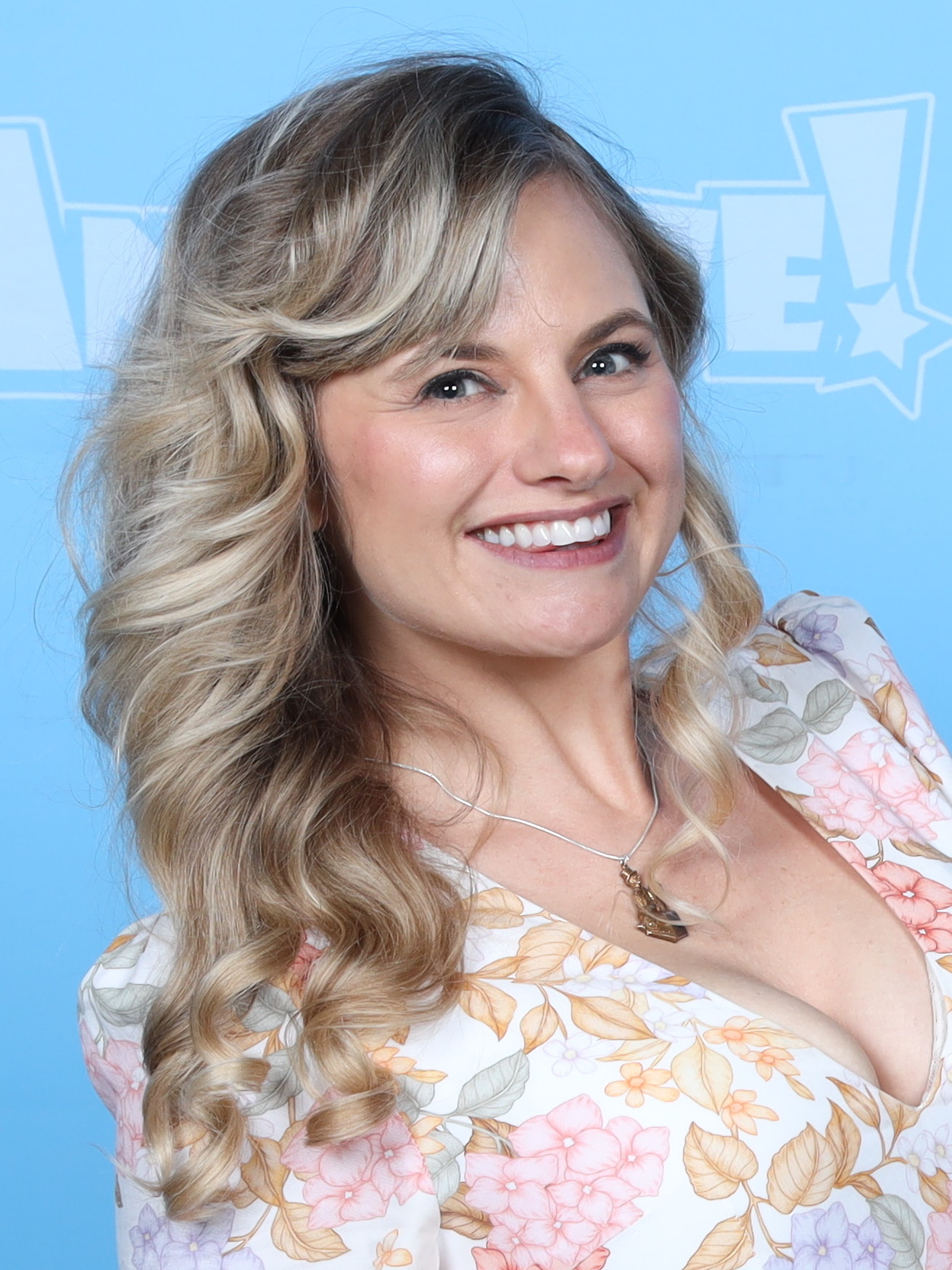
In most media, Haruka Tomatsu (Japanese, left) and Tia Ballard (English, right) provide the voice of Zero Two in their respective languages.

An elite pilot belonging to APE's special forces, Zero Two is a mysterious and rebellious girl often referred to as a monster due to her red horns and klaxosaur blood. She is also known as the "partner killer" as all partners who pilot Strelizia with her always die after riding three times with her at most, with Hiro being the only exception. She always refers to Hiro by the eponym "darling". Her true age is unknown but is clearly around Hiro's age. Her ultimate wish is to become fully human so she can reunite with an important person from her past, which turned out to be Hiro. Since she was a child, she was inspired by a book called "The Beast and the Prince", which she notes is similar to the circumstances of her and Hiro. She begins creating her own version of the story but intentionally left the last page blank because of the likelihood she may have to part ways with Hiro.

She later finds out she is a clone of the Klaxosaur Princess created by Dr. Franxx. When Hiro is forced to link with the princess, Zero Two is able to mentally connect with Strelizia to save him and stop VIRM from destroying the planet but this left her body catatonic. Mentally, she continued fighting VIRM in a galactic battle in space. She and Hiro reconnect, allowing Zero Two to merge with Strelizia, becoming the Strelizia True Apus, and overpower the VIRM. She and Hiro then part ways with their friends but promise to return. In the final episode, Zero Two and Hiro are nearly defeated but they sacrifice themselves to destroy the VIRM home planet and free the souls trapped by VIRM. At some point in the future, they are reincarnated into two children.

== Reception ==
=== Merchandise ===
Zero Two Nendoroid

Zero Two Kotobukiya figure

Several pieces of merchandising action figures based on Zero Two have been announced. A Nendoroid, a brand of figures manufactured by Good Smile Company that typically feature exchangeable faces and body parts, was released in December 2018. Other figures from Kotobukiya and S.H. Figuarts were released by the end of 2018.

=== Awards and nominations ===
At Newtype Anime Awards 2017–2018, Zero Two ranked second for Best Female Character. Eric Van Allen of Kotaku describes Zero Two as "much a protagonist as Hiro" and considers her character arc as "one of the show's best parts". Skyler Allen notes that Zero Two's energetic nature "lets her steal pretty much every scene she's in". Tokyo Otaku Mode News ranked Zero Two twice as the best Winter 2018 character in both male and female polls.

On March 5, 2018, Kim Kardashian posted a picture of Zero Two on her Instagram profile, stating that the character was the inspiration for her hairstyle.

Zero Two became the subject of many internet memes. One scene of an emotional conversation between Zero Two and Hiro became a meme when fans realized that the animation made their mouth movements easy to manipulate and dub over with nonsensical audio. Popular edits involved audio such as dial-up modem connection sounds or popular music. The meme began when a Tumblr user posted an edit with barking noises over the two characters. The scene originates from episode 15 of Darling in the Franxx. In November 2020, a video edit of Zero Two dancing to a remix version of "2 Phút Hơn" by Pháo became viral. The dance itself was taken from "ME!ME!ME!" The trend originated in China when TikTokers began mimicking the dance. The song and the associated clip of Zero Two appeared in popular memes.

Year	Award	Category	Recipient(s)	Result	Ref.
2018	8th Newtype Anime Awards	Best Character (Female)	Zero Two	Runner-up	
2018	8th Newtype Anime Awards	Best Voice Actress	Haruka Tomatsu as Zero Two	Nominated	
2019	3rd Crunchyroll Anime Awards	Best Voice Artist Performance (English)	Tia Ballard as Zero Two	Nominated	
2019	Funimation	Best Girls of the Decade	Zero Two	Won	

== See also ==
- List of Darling in the Franxx characters
- Rei Ayanami (from the Neon Genesis Evangelion franchise)
- Asuka Langley Soryu (from the Neon Genesis Evangelion franchise)
- Lacus Clyne (from the Gundam Seed franchise)
- Lum (from the Urusei Yatsura franchise)
