= Happy Life =

Single by Mika Nakashima and Salyu
- Released: May 12, 2017
- Genre: Pop
- Length: 3:42
- Label: Sony Music Associated Records
- Songwriters: Takeshi Kobayashi; Yuko Ando
- Producer: Takeshi Kobayashi

Mika Nakashima singles chronology
"Koi o Suru" (2017)	"Happy Life" (2017)	"A or B" (2017)

Salyu singles chronology
"What a Wonderful World" (2016)	"Happy Life" (2017)

Audio sample
- "Happy Life": file; help

"Happy Life" is a song recorded by Japanese singers Mika Nakashima and Salyu. It was released as an exclusively digital single by Sony Music Associated Records on May 12, 2017. It was co-written by Takeshi Kobayashi and Yuko Ando and composed, arranged and produced by Kobayashi. The song was subsequently included as a B-side on the single "A or B". "Happy Life" was used in Tokyo Metro's televised commercial campaign Find My Tokyo, starring actress Satomi Ishihara.

== Composition ==
Kobayashi wrote the song with an image in mind of a woman working in the urban area of Tokyo. Salyu was invited to be a featured artist on the song because Kobayashi wanted the song to represent friendship among women; he thought having two unique voices rather than one would better symbolize this theme. Yuko Ando also co-wrote the lyrics to "Happy Life", adding a third female creative voice to the mix.

== Critical reception ==
"Happy Life" was praised for the "peaceful quality" of the song. CDJournal critics also praised the combination of Nakashima and Salyu's voices, describing it as a duet that leaves you "basking in the afterglow".
