= Hiroki Gotō =

Japanese voice actor

- 後藤 ヒロキ
- Born: Saitama Prefecture, Japan
- Other name: Hiroki Gotou
- Occupation: Voice actor
- Years active: 2009-present

Hiroki Gotō (後藤 ヒロキ, Gotō Hiroki) is a Japanese voice actor who was previously affiliated with Across Entertainment. He has been voice acting since 2009. He has often performed voices for minor and guest roles, as well as supporting character roles.

== Filmography ==
=== Anime television ===
2011

- Hunter × Hunter (2011 series) - Boatsman B (episode 1)

2012

- Sword Art Online - player (episodes 1 and 4)

2013

- Log Horizon - Michitaka

2014

- Space Dandy - Register (episode 13)
- D-Frag! - Yokoshima
- Hozuki's Coolheadedness - Kakisuke

2015

- One-Punch Man - Zeniru, Ancient King, Geryuganshoop
- Yu-Gi-Oh! Arc-V - Duel Chaser 227

2017

- ACCA: 13-Territory Inspection Dept. - Pochard
- Tsugumomo - Kazuaki Kagami

2018

- Darling in the Franxx - Code:214 / Futoshi

2019

- Vinland Saga - Torgrim

2020

- In/Spectre - Bake-danuki
- Tsugu Tsugumomo - Kazuaki Kagami
- Log Horizon: Destruction of the Round Table - Michitaka

2021

- Sonny Boy - Rajdhani

2022

- Made in Abyss: The Golden City of the Scorching Sun - Majikaja
- Spy × Family - Orphanage owner, Spy Wars announcer, Brennan, Thomas Austin, WISE veteran agent, Jack Glooman

2023

- The Diary of Ochibi-san - Jack

Unknown date

- The Everyday Tales of a Cat God - Makitarō Komiya (episodes 4, 6)
- Fairy Tail - Bozu, Gatou, Martam, Bob, Nadal, Wang Chanji
- Honto ni Atta! Reibai-Sensei - Cat Sensei; Principal
- Humanity Has Declined - as shed owner
- Jormungand Perfect Order - Kowit Nualkhair (episode 16)
- Majikoi - Oh! Samurai Girls - undersecretary (episodes 8, 10)
- Night Raid 1931 - additional voice (episode 2)
- Okamikakushi - Masque of the Wolf - Sabu (episode 12)
- Sket Dance - male student B (episode 14)

=== Video games ===
- Ace Combat: Joint Assault (2010) - additional voices
- E.X. Troopers (2012) - Max
- Gachitora: The Roughneck Teacher in High School (2011) - additional voices
- Overwatch, Junkrat
- Tokyo Afterschool Summoners (2016) - Shiro Motoori
- Trek to Yomi (2022) - Sadatame
- Mario + Rabbids Sparks of Hope (2022) - Beep-0

=== Dubbing roles ===
==== Live-action ====
- Charlie Countryman – Karl (Rupert Grint)
- Cuban Fury – Gary (Rory Kinnear)
- Divergent – Peter Hayes (Miles Teller)
- The Divergent Series: Insurgent – Peter Hayes (Miles Teller)
- The Divergent Series: Allegiant – Peter Hayes (Miles Teller)
- Doctor Sleep – Charlie (George Mengert)
- Dracula Untold – Shkelgim (Zach McGowan)
- Final Cut – Armel (Sébastien Chassagne)
- House of Cards – Peter Russo (Corey Stoll)
- Hummingbird – Billy (Dai Bradley)
- Lovelace – Gerry Damiano (Hank Azaria)
- Smash – Dev Sundaram (Raza Jaffrey)
- Son of a Gun – Wilson (Damon Herriman)
- Sushi Girl – Francis (James Duval)
- Transcendence – Heng (Fernando Chien)

==== Animation ====
- The Amazing World of Gumball – Tobias, Leslie, Bobato, Rocky Robinson, Laurence "Larry" Needlemeyer, Anton, Bobert
- Hazbin Hotel – Valentino
- Helluva Boss – Striker (season 1), Collin, Vassago
- Hotel Transylvania – Zombie Mask
- Lego Monkie Kid – Pigsy
- Skylanders Academy – Kaos
