= Kiss of Death (song) =

Single by Mika Nakashima

from the album Yuki No Hana 15th Anniversary Best Bible and Joker
- B-side: "Glamorous Sky"
- Released: March 7, 2018
- Genre: Pop rock; electropop
- Length: 4:10
- Label: Sony Music Associated Records
- Songwriter: Hideto Takarai
- Producer: Hyde

Mika Nakashima singles chronology
"A or B" (2017)	"Kiss of Death" (2018)	"Sairen" (2018)

Audio sample
- "Kiss of Death": file; help

"Kiss of Death" (stylized in all caps) is a song recorded by Japanese singer Mika Nakashima, released as a single by Sony Music Associated Records on March 7, 2018. It was written and produced by L'Arc-en-Ciel's Hyde. The song marks the first collaboration between Nakashima and Hyde in thirteen years, since "Glamorous Sky". "Kiss of Death" is the opening theme to the Tokyo MX anime series Darling in the Franxx. The title track was released digitally in advance after premiering on the series' second episode, on January 20, 2018.

== Chart performance ==
Upon being released digitally, "Kiss of Death" charted at number 12 on the weekly RecoChoku Singles Chart and at number 6 on the weekly Mora Singles Chart. It also debuted on several Billboard Japan charts: at number 81 on the Hot 100, number 19 on Hot Animation and number 23 on Download Songs. "Kiss of Death" entered the weekly Oricon Digital Singles Chart at number 22, selling 5,000 copies in its first charting week. The song stayed at number 22 the following week, bringing its total reported digital sales figure to 10,000 copies.

The physical release of "Kiss of Death" entered the daily Oricon Singles Chart at number 16. It peaked at number 9 the following day. The single debuted at number 17 on the weekly Oricon Albums Chart, with 7,000 copies sold in its first week.

== Track listing ==
No.	Title	Writer(s)	Arranger(s)	Length
1.	"Kiss of Death"	Hyde	Hyde; Carlos K.	4:09
2.	"Glamorous Sky" (Re:Present 2018)	Ai Yazawa; Hyde	Hyde; K.A.Z	4:29
3.	"Kiss of Death" (Instrumental)	Hyde	Hyde; Carlos K.	4:09
4.	"Glamorous Sky" (Re:Present 2018) (Instrumental)	Hyde	Hyde; K.A.Z	4:26
Total length:				17:15

Limited anime edition 'A'
No.	Title	Writer(s)	Arranger(s)	Length
1.	"Kiss of Death"	Hyde	Hyde; Carlos K.	4:09
2.	"Glamorous Sky" (Re:Present 2018)	Yazawa; Hyde	Hyde; K.A.Z	4:29
3.	"Kiss of Death" (TV Size)	Hyde	Hyde; Carlos K.	1:32
4.	"Kiss of Death" (Instrumental)	Hyde	Hyde; Carlos K.	4:08
Total length:				14:19

Limited anime edition 'A' DVD
No.	Title	Length
1.	"Darling in the Franxx" (Opening Sequence) (「ダーリン・イン・ザ・フランキス」OP映像, "Dārin In Za Furankisu" OP Eizō)

Limited edition 'B' DVD
No.	Title	Director(s)	Length
1.	"Kiss of Death" (Music Video)	Takashi Tadokoro
2.	"Kiss of Death" (Making of Music Video)

== Charts ==
Chart (2018)	Peak position
Japan Daily Singles (Oricon)	9
Japan Weekly Singles (Oricon)	17
Japan Weekly Digital Singles (Oricon)	22
Japan Hot 100 (Billboard)	27
Japan Hot Animation (Billboard)	7
Japan Download Songs (Billboard)	23
Japan Weekly Singles (Mora)	6
Japan Weekly Singles (RecoChoku)	12

== Accolades ==
Year	Award	Category	Result	Ref.
2018	8th Newtype Anime Awards	Best Theme Song (from anime Darling in the Franxx)	3rd place	
2019	3rd Crunchyroll Anime Awards	Best Opening Sequence	Won	
