= List of Ga-Rei characters =

This is a list of characters from the manga series Ga-Rei by Hajime Segawa, included the characters from the anime adaptation directed by Ei Aoki.

== Main characters ==
Kensuke Nimura (弐村 剣輔, Nimura Kensuke)
Voiced by: Minoru Shiraishi (Japanese); Todd Haberkorn (English)
The protagonist, an ordinary high school student who has had the ability to see ghosts ever since he was a child. Because of this, he always felt different, but things changed after meeting Kagura. He started practicing kendo from a young age, being the son of a kendo instructor and utilizes his skills during missions. When fighting, he sometimes dons a pair of sunglasses. The story-line concerns his growth as a spirit-user, his main weapon being swords. He initially wields Michael #12, but after breaking it in a battle, is given the sword Michael Revolution in its place. He supports Kagura during her emotional lows and a bond develops between them.
Kensuke has the same sesshōseki that transformed Yomi into an evil spirit, embedded near his heart. According to Yomi, the sesshōseki itself wished to be placed there. The stone gives him partial memories of Yomi's past, as well as allowing his sword techniques to become radically more powerful. This stone was later removed when Imawano Setsuna forcefully tore it from his body in the Garden of Tamamo, fatally damaging his body in the process. He survived after Kagura defeated Setsuna and revived the Kyuubi, using its powers to restore his body from the brink of death. After firming his resolve to save Kagura from being controlled by the Kyuubi, he unleashes the true power of the Michael Revolution, the ability to cut through dimensions.
Kagura mentions that Kensuke has a unique presence which puts spirits at ease and even Byakuei feels more secure when Kensuke is near.
Kagura Tsuchimiya (土宮 神楽, Tsuchimiya Kagura)
Voiced by: Minori Chihara (Japanese); Leah Clark (English)
Always smiling, Kagura is the heroine of the story. She is feisty and ambitious and can put up a good fight with her spiritual beast, the Ga-Rei Byakuei (nicknamed Shirō), an inugami who resembles a large white dragon. She controls Byakuei from the seal on her back and a long chain that connects her soul to his, so any damage Byakuei receives also damages her as well. Over time, she becomes stronger and more motivated because of the support that Kensuke gives her. She shows signs of having feelings for Kensuke, as she gets jealous when Shizuru and Kensuke are spotted alone together and is shocked when Kyouko tells her that she should go out with Kensuke if she's worried about him. Although she initially treats Shizuru as a rival, they become closer as events in the manga progress.
The anime shows a younger Kagura. Originally a shy, dutiful and sad young girl, her meeting with Yomi after her mother's death changed her life. She came to love Yomi, who treated her like a sister and was under great emotional stress when she found out that Yomi had turned against the Agency and all of humanity.
Yomi Isayama (諫山 黄泉, Isayama Yomi)
Voiced by: Kaoru Mizuhara (Japanese); Alexis Tipton (English)
Sister-figure of Kagura Tsuchimiya who turned evil because of the power of the sesshōseki. Also, she was the person who killed Kagura Tsuchimiya's father. She was killed by Kagura herself and has turned completely evil in her afterlife. She was extraordinarily talented when alive and slaughtered over 70 ministry agents by herself and defeated the head of the Tsuchimiya clan and his spirit beast, Byakuei. As an evil spirit, she becomes even more powerful. She tries to awaken a great demon sealed in Tokyo and seals a piece of the sesshōseki in Nimura Kensuke. For this, she incurs Kazuhiro's wrath and he takes away her own sesshōseki.
Yomi's past is prominently revealed in Ga-Rei: Zero, where she is shown to be more of a tragic heroine. She lost her parents at a young age to specters and was taken in by Isayama Naraku, then head of the Isayama family. Yomi grew to love and respect her foster-father and polished her skills to repay him for his kindness. Her efforts led to her inheritance of the prized Isayama heirloom, the sword Shishio, which held the spiritual beast Nue in it. Before Naraku's death, she was betrothed to Izuna Noriyuki and would have succeeded Naraku as the next Isayama head. However, Naraku's death at the hands of her cousin Mei, who was jealous of her good fortune, and the alteration of Naraku's will, resulted in her being stripped of her position in the family and therefore her entire inheritance. Yomi eventually found out the truth behind her father's death, revealed by Mei herself after the latter lured her out in order to kill her. Partly in self-defense, she killed Mei and avenged Naraku, but was ambushed by Mitogawa Kazuhiro, who wounded her so badly that she became hospitalized, her throat and most of the tendons in her body cut and unrepairable, unable to talk or move. This, in addition to the suspicion that she had murdered Mei, led to a series of events that caused her to succumb to Mitogawa's temptation to accept the sesshōseki. Though Yomi managed to retain some control over her mind, she had nonetheless fallen under the destructive influence of the stone, causing her to kill many members of the Agency. Ultimately, it was her love and desire to protect Kagura that caused her death at Kagura's hands, in a desperate wish that she could remove anything that would harm Kagura, including herself.
Tsuina Takiguchi (滝口 ツイナ, Takiguchi Tsuina)
The main character in Ga-Rei: Tsuina no shou and appears in vol. 8 of the main series. She is a girl possessed by a curse that brings misfortune upon all those she falls in love with, if she even thinks about love it weakens those around her. Her ability is absorbing and purifying Spirit Energy. She fell in love with Mikado at first sight.
In Ga-Rei, she appears in Vol. 8 alongside of Mikado after one year of training overseas, presumably America, and is more confident, cheery, as well as skilled enough to absorb Miasma and discharge it into a spear to destroy a huge spirit. She then asks if Kensuke wants to rejoin the Counter-Measure department if it is rebuilt. She can also fight using a Robot-like suit, Vandam. She is an escort of the White Priestess, Kagura.

== The Agency ==
Noriyuki Izuna (飯綱 紀之, Izuna Noriyuki)
Voiced by: Shinya Takahashi (Japanese); Jason Liebrecht (English)
An old friend of Kagura and ex-fiancée of Isayama Yomi. He uses Kudagitsune, or spirit pipe foxes, to spy on people and fight. He's very perverted and constantly tries to grope Kagura, with painful results. He is part of the information department.
Underneath his perverted and cheerfully helpless facade, Izuna is very powerful, able to fight on equal terms with Yomi. He is very knowledgeable on the subject of spirits and is skilled in hojutsu. He treats Kagura like a little sister and demonstrates concern for Kensuke. As Yomi's ex-fiance, he still had feelings for her. Behind all of his jokes and lecherous acts lies a man full of pity and self-loathing. After the Kyuubi arc, he tagged along with Imawano Shizuru to find her sister, Setsuna, but it is still unknown if they managed to locate her. He meets up with Kensuke and Kagura on the mountain and mistakes Izumi for Yomi. Izuna sees a lot of himself in Kensuke, which is why he wants to help Kensuke become stronger so that Kagura won't share the same fate as Yomi. It is revealed that he was blinded when he was poisoned by Mitogawa: now relying on his Kudagitsune to see. He is fatally wounded when he protects Yomi from a stab meant for her. As of chapter 48, Yomi had one of her protectors sacrifice the remaining power of his soul to save Noriyuki. He is seen later defending her from Mine, Sharing the same Evil spirit state Yomi is in.
Ga-Rei: Zero reveals how different Noriyuki was before the events of the manga. He was more of a playboy rather than a pervert, which angers his fiancée, Yomi, even though it is shown he does care about her.
Ga-Rei: Tsuina no shou reveals he saved Tsuina from an evil spirit and fought Mikado when he was planning to kill her to stop a spirit, claiming "Pretty girls are the country's treasure" and took her under his wing for training. He claims to be interested in her but given his nature he could be joking.
Kyōko Mikado (帝 京子, Mikado Kyōko)
An agent of the Ministry and heir of her clan. She controls paper spirits, or shikigami. She gets along well with Kagura and often tries to get her and Kensuke together. She is very proud and went to fight Kidoumaru when he broke through her shikigami barriers. She ended up badly injured, but landed a critical blow on him. Usually, she is amiable and friendly. She is currently back in her parents' home in Kyoto.
Fujiko Mine (峰 不死子, Mine Fujiko)
Minister of the Environment as well as Kyouko Mine's grandmother. Her name is written as "Immortal Child". She may be old but she's not a person to mess with. In the events of Ga-Rei: Zero, she retired from her position and gave it to her other granddaughter, Ayame Jinguuji. After Yomi's attack on Ayame and Kiri, she left retirement to resume her former duties in Ayame's place. After the agency was disbanded she watches over Kagura.
A side-chapter featuring an 18-year-old Fujiko reveals that she took care of Kagura's grandmother, Ruri, before the formation of the Agency after WWII.
Koji Iwahata (岩端 晃司, Iwahata Kōji)
Voiced by: Tetsu Inada (Japanese); Phil Parsons (English)
An agent of the Ministry. He is very tall and muscular, as well as a powerful spirit-user. He uses guns to fight. Some of the more comical moments in the manga suggest that he may be homosexual (which is confirmed in the anime). He is an ex-soldier and was hired by a mercenary corporation until the Agency recruited him for his ability to sense spirits. After the department breaks up he disappears until chapter 38. In the anime, he was attracted to both Kensuke and Kazuki, which made them both uncomfortable.
Ayame Jingūji (神宮寺 菖蒲, Jingūji Ayame)
Voiced by: Mai Aizawa (Japanese); Anastasia Muñoz (English)
The Minister of Environment during the events of Ga-Rei: Zero and Fujiko Mine's other granddaughter. This character uses a wheelchair. She is nice and kind-hearted person with a relaxed air. While likable, she is very serious and earns her respect from her subordinates. Her personal assistant is Kiri Nikaidou who she affectionately calls "Kiri-chan".
She confronts Yomi and is later presumed to be unknown, thus explaining why her grandmother, Mine Fujiko, returns to take her place as the Minister of the Environment. In the last episode, she is seen alive and well in a hospital talking with Kiri.
It is hinted in episode 11 that Ayame may be married (thus suggesting that Jinguji may actually be her husband's family name). She is shown taking out a ring and a photograph of her before she became crippled, holding onto a man whose face is not shown. During her confrontation with Yomi, Ayame states that she once killed someone more important to her, hinting that her husband may have suffered corruption himself and was killed by her.
Ayame is also the only person who addresses the spiritual beasts (chiefly Ranguren) with nicknames that end in "-chan" (e.g. Ranguren as Ran-chan). The wheels on her wheelchair are inscribed to ward off spirits and it is shown she fights quite well, having been able to combat Yomi briefly.
Kiri Nikaidō (二階堂 桐, Nikaidō Kiri)
Voiced by: Maki Tsuchiya (Japanese); Trina Nishimura (English)
Ayame's personal assistant who helps her in her duties as minister. She has a serious work attitude and is very loyal to her boss, Ayame, as well as doesn't hesitate to scold others who disrespect her boss. She serves as the disciplinarian and the harsh voice of the Agency, in contrast to Ayame's friendly attitude. She is last seen in hospital talking with Ayame about Yomi's attack on HQ two years ago. She appears to have suffered mental damage due to her ordeal with Yomi, becoming childlike and addressing Ayame as "onee-chan" (elder sister).
Kazuki Sakuraba (桜庭 一騎, Sakuraba Kazuki)
Voiced by: Minoru Shiraishi (Japanese); Scott Freeman (English)
An agent of the Ministry. He is a young and sarcastic, annoying yet talented man around the same age as Noriyuki during the events of Ga-Rei: Zero. His weapons are two suitcases that open up at the bottom to reveal rows of muzzles, a kind of multi-row gatling gun, which he also uses as melee weapons. Later in the anime, Yomi tortures him to death with Noriyuki looking on, blaming himself for his (Noriyuki's) inability to kill her, explaining why Kazuki does not appear in the manga.
Nabū Brothers (ナブー兄弟)
Voiced by: Norio Wakamoto (Japanese); Bob Carter (English)
Two large twin brothers who both have the same name, as they come from a culture that give twins the same name. Both brothers tend to finish each other's sentences. Because they look identical, it leads some of their teammates to confusion. In the manga, only one of the Nabu brothers appears (as a minor character with no lines) since the other brother was killed by Ranguren in Ga-Rei: Zero. The surviving Nabu was later killed during the Juugondō's attack on the Agency, after trying to protect Fujiko Mine from enemy fire.
An omake in volume 5 of the manga states that the Nabus are part of the San people from Southern Africa, further confirmed in their character page on the anime's official website. According to the omake, they lost their home and family to war.
Michael Kohara (小原 マイケル, Kohara Maikeru)
Voiced by: Hirokazu Hiramatsu (Japanese); J. Michael Tatum (English)
A large man from Australia who speaks bad Japanese with a foreign accent, frequently mixing in some English words. He is Iwahata's master and the creator of most of the Ministry of Environment's weapons from the practical guns and swords, to the often bizarre irons and boilers. Because of his appearance, he tends to be arrested by the police for indecent exposure. Despite being outlandish, he is greatly respected in the Agency for his skill, his creations famed for their ability to augment the user's spiritual output by several times. He possesses mid-tier spiritual abilities.
Souzaemon Mikado (帝 綜左衛門, Mikado Souzaemon)
A main character in Ga-Rei: Tsuina no shou and appears in vol. 8 of the main series. An Exorcist for the Kyoto division of the Counter-measure department. He uses a shikigami called "Shuwarutsu" and he's skilled with Fuda to the point he can make a road in the sky. He takes his duties seriously and if killing someone to protect the greater good is needed he'll try to go through with it.
In Ga-Rei he appears once in Vol. 7 when Kagura is possessed and states that she must be killed. In Vol. 8 he appears with Tsuina and helps with the plan to purify Naraku. He also informs Kagura she was once a member. At the end of the series he proposes to Tsuina.

== Juugondō ==
Shizuru Imawano (忌野 静流, Imawano Shizuru)
A mysterious girl who first encounters Kensuke at school and then corners him in the bathroom. She demonstrates knowledge of the sesshōseki and threatens him with a gun, but then flirts with him. She reveals she has a sesshōseki of her own on a necklace. She is a lively and flirtatious girl but is emotionally closed-off and gets angry with herself when she gets closer to Kagura and Kensuke, as she is afraid of becoming too involved. She has been forced to kill from a young age and feels that there is no way out of the path set for her as heir to a criminal organization, explicitly shown after her elder sister, Setsuna, kills their father. This is something Kagura sympathizes with and is a key factor why she wants to help Shizuru.
There is a competition between her and Kagura to obtain the most sesshōseki, with Kensuke as the prize, but after the Kyuubi arc it is shown that Shizuru accepts the close bond Kagura and Kensuke share and bows out. She left Tokyo with Izuna to look for her own path and to find her sister, who disappeared from the hospital after the battle, but it is still unknown if they managed to locate her. She reappears with Izuna to rescue Kagura from the daidarabochi.
Shizuru is very competent with a gun and is shown to have excellent marksmanship from when she silenced Kensuke by intentionally shooting at his forehead in an instant with her arms chained together and only causing a presumably shallow wound on the side of his head. Shizuru's hand-to-hand combat ability is equal to Kagura, as the two passed out simultaneously after defeating each other. She is shown to be ambidextrous, alternating a gun and her knife between her left and right hands respectively.
Setsuna Imawano (忌野 刹那, Imawano Setsuna)
Shizuru's sister, who used to be very close with her. She was a genius of the Juugondō, which made the head of the Juugondō, her father, feel threatened. He tried to have her assassinated and used Shizuru as a hostage and so she disappeared, leaving Shizuru distraught but safe. She turns up when her father comes to Tokyo and kills him immediately with the other members in a coup, leaving her in control of the Juugondō. She later attacks the Agency and kills most of the agents, except for Kagura, Kensuke, Kyouko and Iwahata.
Setsuna is a skilled fighter, able to easily toy with Kensuke. She has the "Eye of Satori," a telepathic ability that enables her to read minds. As a consequence, one of her eyes is remarkably different from the other. She has a spirit beast, a water-using ogre-like creature called Suiko (Water Tiger). She is ruthless and ambitious, willing to kill her own sister and subordinates. Her goal was to set the planet into eternal war.
During the fight in Tamamo's garden she killed Kensuke: however, after using the power of the Kyuubi, Kagura revived him. During the cataclysmic event when the Kyuubi came into being again, Setsuna lost an arm to protect Shizuru. She has disappeared from the hospital and since then Shizuru and Izuna have been tracking her down.

== Judgement Day ==
This group is of characters trying to bring about the end of the planet; they nearly were all exorcist of the past. They sought to escort the Priestesses of Dark (Yomi) to Naraku. Their reason for being born in this era is to destroy it.

Okama Zankurou
A cross-dressing samurai, his swordsmanship easily surpasses Kensuke's and he can completely hide his presence. He was an exorcist living during the Sengoku Jidai and took under his wing a boy who resembled Kensuke (and whom he claims to be Kensuke's previous incarnation), orphaned by a spectre attack. Unfortunately Okama fell under the spell of the Sesshouseki and was ultimately killed by his own student (whom Kensuke believes was his ancestor).
Hattori Naizou
A masked and cloaked ninja who uses Kunai. He too was an exorcist who for unrevealed reasons abandoned his duty and became a nuke-nin. His design resembles Batman but with a top-knot on his head instead of the bat-ears. After Izuna Noriyuki was mortally wounded, Hattori offered to revive him by combining his essence with the former, which turned Noriyuki into a spectre and supposedly caused Hattori to disappear.
God of the Land
A tanned old man, in the past he was known as the "God of the Land", he is the same as the Kyuubi and Tengu, a body born of a pure soul and ancient earth. He is completely neutral stating that as a "God" he is part of the "Decimation Plan", he gives advice to Kensuke to protects Kagura as her Escorts and awakens her memories.

== Antagonists ==
Kidōmaru (鬼童丸)
A spirit who helps Yomi. He is a swordsman in samurai attire and is very powerful. He is critically injured by Kyouko, but not before he almost kills her. Later, he is finished off by Kagura.
Kazuhiro Mitogawa (三途河 カズヒロ, Mitogawa Kazuhiro)
Voiced by: Megumi Matsumoto (Japanese); Brina Palencia (English)
A boy who used to belong to the Agency. He was enthralled by the sesshōseki, hoping to use the Kyuubi's powers to revive his mother, an exorcist who had been previously killed in action. When Lord Tamamo appeared to him in the Vatican's library, he willingly became one of her minions, sparking off the events in Ga-Rei: Zero and the first 7 volumes of the manga. He was the one who gave Yomi her sesshōseki and later took it away after he was displeased with Yomi giving one to Kensuke. He mentions a "Lord Tamamo" as his overlord, the former mistress of the Kyuubi before its sealing. After Yomi's demise, he is next seen participating in the Juugondō coup as Setsuna's underling. He removes Kagura and Kensuke's souls from their bodies and takes them to a spirit dimension he calls "Tamamo Garden", where they encounter Lady Tamamo.
He uses insect-related magic and seems to have powers related to the sesshōseki, such as being able to remove the souls of people who possess them. One of his eyes contains a sesshōseki. He was later killed by his resurrected mother, before Izuna could avenge Yomi. He wanted to expose the world they live in to the public, in a way he succeeded since the Kyuubi was seen around the planet.
Lord Tamamo
The successor to the Kyuubi, she is the mastermind behind the sesshōseki-related incidents that have occurred and Kazuhiro's overlord. She used to be a demon-user who became an evil spirit of incredible power after death. She is first identified in chapter 19, when Kazuhiro removes Kagura's and Kensuke's souls and takes them to Tamamo Garden. When Kagura attacks him, Tamamo intervenes and reveals herself. Tamamo tells them to fight and search for the ten sesshōseki and that the one who collects them all will control the Kyuubi and be its true successor.
Lord Tamamo doesn't seem to have a discernible personality and appears quite inhuman.

== Spiritual Beasts ==
Byakuei (白叡)
Kagura's beast, the titular Enchained Spirit Beast of the series. A dragon-like inugami with chains wrapped around it. The chains connect its soul to Kagura's and whenever Byakuei gets injured, Kagura will get hurt as well. He is one of the most powerful spirit beasts on earth. He was sealed in ancient times and has been passed down to the head of the Tsuchimiya family for generations. A lengthy ritual is required to seal Byakuei inside the recipient and Byakuei is never completely released, as he would break free of the seal and devour his owner.
In the fight against the immortal demon, Kagura tried to fully release Byakuei as she thought she was going to die. While she didn't, Byakuei's seal had been weakened and he started going out of control. Kagura initially wanted to kill him with the power of the Kyuubi, but has rejected that notion, as he is the only family she has.
In actuality, Byakuei is a wolf-like beast in his uncursed form and unlike his dragon and twin-head dragon forms, he has only one set of eyes, instead of two sets on each head.
After the incident with the Kyuubi and to the due loss of spirit energy he became a puppy version of himself. He gains a wolf like form while fighting Kirin but soon shrinks once it disappears. He carries a sword in his tail and Mikado believes his puppy form may be temporary. He can now transform at will.
Byakuei has the ability to absorb and convert another spiritual body into his own, an ability he demonstrated in the Garden of Tamamo against Setsuna and during the end of the Kyuubi arc, where he "ate" the Kyuubi's form. The full extent of this ability is shown in chapter 52, where he merged with the Tengu, which was released due to the weakening of his seal and took over the latter's body and powers.
Ranguren (乱紅蓮)/Nue (鵺)
Yomi's spirit beast, below Shizuru's Kuroford on the Spirit Beast Rankings. Nue is the japanese equivalent term for chimera, a mythical beast having different animals as its body parts, like a lion for its head and snakes as tails.
Kuroford (黒四駑, Kurofōdo)
Shizuru's spirit beast, the second strongest after Byakuei. Kuroford was originally sealed within an iron knife, but Shizuru drew him out. He utilises lighting-based attacks. After Shizuru lost her Sesshoseki to Setsuna, she could not unleash Kuroford. However, her willpower finally drew him out when attacked by the Juugondo in the haunted house.
Tanuki (狸)
A bake-danuki (raccoon-dog with spiritual powers) that can transform into a metal wall with a human face. It is introduced in chapter 16 of the manga, where it protected Kensuke from its mate, which was corrupted by a Sesshouseki, hoping to prevent her from killing anyone. Unfortunately, the extraction of its Sesshouseki resulted in the demise of its mate. Since then, Tanuki has stuck on to Kensuke, becoming a loyal sidekick of sorts to the latter. Tanuki's wall form is surprising sturdy, capable of withstanding even a missile and even laser emitting from the Kyuubi's defense system, QB9. It has a pouch and bell resembling that of Doraemon from the anime of the same name, with a similar facial structure. In later chapters, Tanuki dons a cape as well. It also encourages Kensuke to keep going after Kagura. In chapter 52, Kensuke calls Tanuki "Boko" to which it responded, suggesting that this might be the name that Kensuke has decided for it.
Kakushigami
A peculiar black square-shaped creature kept in a cage with protruding spikes. It has the ability to turn people near it invisible and was first introduced in the 22nd chapter of the manga. While Kagura and the others were in hiding, it hid them from their pursuers and subsequently came to live with them during their exile.
Kirin
A black-wolf from Naraku who acts as Byakuei's opposite, it emits a large amount of miasma and is extremely violent. It is revealed in chapter 52 to be the incarnation of the Kyuubi. In the final battle, Kirin burst through Byakuei and snapped the chain that bound Kagura's soul to Byakuei. If the chain were snapped, it is like tearing your soul in half. Kagura was later saved by Yomi when she used her remaining soul to seal the gap in Kagura's. Kirin was killed after one of the Black Priestess's guardians reached down its throat and tore out its black heart.
Kyuubi (Nine-Tailed Fox)
A large monster the size of a city created when the ten pieces of the Seshouseki came together. The might of the Kyuubi was unimaginable and therefore could be seen by ordinary citizens. Anything that touches the Kyuubi would desintigrate into nothing with an exception of Kensuke, for he was infused with the Kyuubi's power to be resurrected. Upon its back lies the host, in this case, Kagura, a single individual with their heart infused with the Kyuubi's own feelings and therefore will show no facial emotions. The might of the creature also grants the host unlimited power to grant their hearts deepest wish no matter how impossible it was, in Kagura's case it was the resurrection of Yomi as Izumi. The host is surrounded by several masks, which are the guardians of the host firing energy out of their eyes at any threat. Their faces are indestructible and provide the perfect defense system. After Kensuke found himself on the Kyuubi's back twenty feet from Kagura, he was forced to engage the masks in combat with his Michael Revolution. His primary goal was to slice the cocoon which held Kagura but could not reach her due to the masks' lasers and blocks. In the end, he willed enough love into his sword and unlocked the power to slice through space extending his attack behind the masks and destroying the cocoon freeing Kagura and defeating the Kyuubi.
