= Darling in the Franxx =

Japanese anime television series

- Key visual featuring squad 13

ダーリン・イン・ザ・フランキス (Dārin In Za Furankisu)
- Genre: Mecha; Romantic drama
- Created by: Code:000
- Anime television series
- Directed by: Atsushi Nishigori
- Produced by: Yōsuke Toba; Mikio Uetsuki; Eiichi Kamagata
- Written by: Atsushi Nishigori; Naotaka Hayashi
- Music by: Asami Tachibana
- Studio: A-1 Pictures (Note: A-1 Pictures was on the Production (制作) team and Production Committee (製作) throughout the series' entire run, and they, separate from the Kōenji Studio, are credited for Animation Production (アニメーション制作) for episode 18.); Trigger (Note: Trigger is credited for Animation Production (アニメーション制作) for episodes 4, 6, 8, 10, 12, and 14, and the studio stayed on the Production (制作) team throughout the series' run.); CloverWorks (Note: A-1 Pictures' subsidiary Kōenji Studio rebranded to CloverWorks during production. CloverWorks, as an independent company and as the former Kōenji Studio, is credited for Animation Production (アニメーション制作) for episodes 1–3, 5, 7, 9, 11, 13, 15–17, and 19–24.)
- Licensed by: Crunchyroll (streaming); SEA: Plus Media Networks Asia
- Original network: Tokyo MX, GYT, GTV, BS11, ABC, Mētele, HOME, BSS, BBC, AT-X
- English network: SEA: Aniplus Asia
- Original run: January 13, 2018 – July 7, 2018
- Episodes: 24
- Manga
- Written by: Code:000
- Illustrated by: Kentaro Yabuki
- Published by: Shueisha
- English publisher: NA: Seven Seas Entertainment
- Imprint: Jump Comics+
- Magazine: Shōnen Jump+
- Original run: January 14, 2018 – January 26, 2020
- Volumes: 8
- Manga

Darling in the Franxx!
- Written by: Mato
- Published by: Shueisha
- Magazine: Shōnen Jump+
- Original run: January 14, 2018 – July 11, 2018
- Volumes: 1
- icon

Darling in the Franxx (Japanese: ダーリン・イン・ザ・フランキス, Hepburn: Dārin In Za Furankisu; stylized as DARLING in the FRANXX), abbreviated as DarliFra (ダリフラ, DariFura), is a Japanese science fiction mecha romance anime television series co-produced by A-1 Pictures and Trigger and animated by Trigger and CloverWorks that premiered in January 2018. The series was announced at Trigger's Anime Expo 2017 panel in July 2017. A manga adaptation by Kentaro Yabuki and another four-panel comic strip manga began serialization in January 2018.

Darling in the Franxx is set in a dystopian future where children are artificially created and indoctrinated solely to defend the remnants of civilization. The story follows a squad of ten pilots, particularly focusing on the partnership between Hiro, a former prodigy, and Zero Two, a hybrid human and elite pilot who aspires to become entirely human.

== Synopsis ==
=== Setting ===
Darling in the Franxx takes place in a dystopian post-apocalyptic 22nd century where the remnants of human civilization have abandoned the surface. Adults and children exist in contrasting environments from each other. Adults live in technologically advanced mobile fortress-cities known as Plantations and are immortal, but procreation and relationships among them have become obsolete and undesirable. Artificially-created children, termed "parasites," are deprived of individuality and are educated only for piloting Franxx in pairs to defend humanity. The children are kept in isolation from adult society in environments nicknamed "birdcages," which emulate that of a bygone era so that they can develop the emotional responses required to pilot Franxx.

In the early 21st century, the progress of human civilization was accelerated by ground-breaking discoveries in mining technology, allowing the extraction of magma energy for a new low-cost, all-encompassing energy source. Scientists contributing to the breakthrough form "APE," an organization that would significantly influence world politics and the global economy as a result of their discoveries. After discovering human immortality, much of mankind opted to become immortal despite the side effect of losing their reproductive functions. A cult of personality surrounds Papa, the chairman of the APE, which all humans come to worship akin to a god. Now governing the remnants of civilization, APE leads humanity to abandon Earth's now desolate surface for the relative safety of the Plantations.

=== Plot ===
In a post-apocalyptic world, humanity is pushed to the brink of extinction by the constant threat of giant creatures known as klaxosaurs (叫竜, kyoryū), which are subdivided into at least four categories based on their size: "Conrad," (Note: Miniature klaxosaurs (few meters large) are called "Conrad" level, originally from Conrad discontinuity named after Austria-Hungarian seismologist Victor Conrad.) "Mohorovičić," (Note: Midsize klaxosaurs (dozens of meters large) are called "Mohorovičić" level, originally from Mohorovičić discontinuity named after Croatian seismologist Andrija Mohorovičić.) "Gutenberg," (Note: Giant klaxosaurs (hundreds of meters large) are called "Gutenberg" level, originally from Core–mantle boundary named after German seismologist Beno Gutenberg.) and "(Super) Lehmann." (Note: The largest klaxosaur class first seen in episode 15, spanning kilometers, originally from Lehmann discontinuity named after Danish seismologist Inge Lehmann.) Parasites are raised to pilot giant mecha known as Franxx (Note: It has a nickname of "Steel maiden.") (フランキス, Furankisu) in boy-girl pairs. A male parasite is termed a "stamen," and a female parasite is referred to as a "pistil" (the male and female reproductive parts of a flower, respectively). Parasites are artificially created and have short lifespans.

A team of ten parasites is assigned to the experimental Squad 13 of Plantation 13. One of them, Hiro (Code:016), is a former pilot-candidate prodigy who can no longer synchronize with his partner, resulting in their failure to complete the training program. While skipping his squad's graduation ceremony, Hiro encounters Zero Two (Code:002), an elite Franxx pilot with klaxosaur blood, red horns, and an infamous reputation as the "Partner Killer." It is rumored that none of Zero Two's partners have survived pairing with her more than three times. Shortly after, a Klaxosaur attacks, disrupting Hiro's graduation ceremony and resulting in Zero Two's partner being killed in action. Zero Two, left without a partner, allows Hiro to ride with her and Hiro becomes Zero Two's "darling". Later in the series, he becomes her partner.

== Media ==
=== Anime ===
Atsushi Nishigori directed the 24-episode anime series with Nishigori and Naotaka Hayashi handling series composition, Masayoshi Tanaka designing the characters, Shigeto Koyama acting as a mechanical designer, Hiroyuki Imaishi serving as action animation director and Asami Tachibana composing the music. The opening theme song, titled "Kiss of Death," was performed by Mika Nakashima and produced by Hyde, while the ending themes titled "Torikago" (トリカゴ) (ep. 1–6), "Manatsu no Setsuna" (真夏のセツナ) (ep 7), "Beautiful World" (ep 8–12, 14), "Hitori" (ひとり) (ep 13), "Escape" (ep 16–20), and "Darling" (ep. 21–23) were performed by XX:me (read as "Kiss Me"), a unit consisting of the series' main female castmembers, Zero Two, Ichigo, Miku, Kokoro, and Ikuno. Crunchyroll streamed the series with original Japanese version and English subtitles, while Funimation has licensed the series, and it was premiered with an English dub. Aniplus Asia simulcast the series in Southeast Asia.

=== Manga ===
A manga adaptation written by Code:000, illustrated by Kentaro Yabuki and another four-panel comic strip spinoff manga by Mato started their serialization on the Shōnen Jump+ website on January 14, 2018. The manga adaptation from volume 4 onwards differs significantly from the original anime. As of May 2, 2018, the manga has sold 400,000 copies in Japan.

On July 1, 2021, Seven Seas Entertainment announced they licensed the manga for North American publication.

No.	Original release date	Original ISBN	English release date	English ISBN
1	February 2, 2018	978-4-08-881454-4	March 29, 2022	978-1-63858-143-7
2	May 2, 2018	978-4-08-881493-3	March 29, 2022	978-1-63858-143-7
3	October 4, 2018	978-4-08-881620-3	June 7, 2022	978-1-63858-297-7
4	February 4, 2019	978-4-08-881752-1	June 7, 2022	978-1-63858-297-7
5	May 2, 2019	978-4-08-881854-2	September 20, 2022	978-1-63858-674-6
6	September 4, 2019	978-4-08-882048-4	September 20, 2022	978-1-63858-674-6
7	January 4, 2020	978-4-08-882196-2	December 6, 2022	978-1-63858-852-8
8	April 3, 2020	978-4-08-882277-8	December 6, 2022	978-1-63858-852-8

Mato's four-panel spinoff manga ended on July 11, 2018, and was compiled into a full-color physical book released on October 4, 2018.

No.	Japanese release date	Japanese ISBN
1	October 4, 2018	978-4-08-881621-0

=== Soundtrack ===
Darling in the Franxx Original Soundtrack

Soundtrack album by Asami Tachibana
- Released: April 25, 2018 (volume 1); July 25, 2018 (volume 2); August 29, 2018 (volume 3); March 27, 2019 (digital)
- Genre: Soundtrack
- Length: 51:38 (volume 1); 48:34 (volume 2); 1:06:40 (volume 3); 2:46:52 (total)
- Label: Aniplex
- Producers: Asami Tachibana; Yasushi Horiguchi (co-producer)

The series' soundtrack is composed by Asami Tachibana and published by Aniplex. The first disc containing 21 tracks is enclosed with the first home video release volume of the anime which was released on April 25, 2018. The second disc also containing 21 tracks is enclosed with the fourth home video release volume which was released on July 25, 2018. The third disc containing 22 tracks is enclosed with the fifth home video release volume which was released on August 29, 2018. All three soundtrack volumes were released digitally on various online music stores on March 27, 2019.

All music is composed by Asami Tachibana.

Darling in the Franxx Original Soundtrack Volume 1
No.	Title	Lyrics	Performer(s)	Length
1.	"cÅGE"	cAnON.	Anna Pingina	4:56
2.	"Vanquish"	Benjamin, mpi	Monique Dehaney	2:40
3.	"Odds and ends"			2:23
4.	"o-DOR"			1:48
5.	"Dino-S"			2:01
6.	"BEAST"			2:46
7.	"Counterattack"			3:03
8.	"Operation"			3:04
9.	"Reversal"			2:47
10.	"In the FRANXX"			2:09
11.	"Trente"			1:51
12.	"Distopia"			1:52
13.	"Godliness"			2:20
14.	"Aile"			2:24
15.	"Clarity"			2:29
16.	"Nuance"			1:50
17.	"Miel"			1:30
18.	"Dropping"			2:08
19.	"CODE:002"			2:36
20.	"VICTORIA"			3:06
21.	"Torikago (BGM-Rearrange)" (composed by Katsuhiko Sugiyama, arranged by Kohta Yamamoto)			1:55
Total length:				51:38

Darling in the Franxx Original Soundtrack Volume 2
No.	Title	Lyrics	Performer(s)	Length
1.	"FUSE"	Benjamin, mpi	Claudia Vazquez	3:01
2.	"Battle Cry"	Dj L-Spade	Dj L-Spade	3:30
3.	"Your smile"			2:17
4.	"Abandoned Places"			1:41
5.	"The Seven Sages"			1:43
6.	"Klaxosaur"			2:23
7.	"Gutenberg"			2:23
8.	"Shady History"			2:37
9.	"ADuLt"			1:35
10.	"One's Word"			1:52
11.	"Vita"			1:53
12.	"CHiLDRen"			1:31
13.	"CODE:015"			2:52
14.	"Lilac"			1:52
15.	"Red Hibiscus"			2:28
16.	"The Sands"			2:09
17.	"Boys×Girls"			1:44
18.	"VICTORIA -piano ver.-"			3:10
19.	"Lilac -guitar ver.-"			1:51
20.	"Mistilteinn"			2:30
21.	"D#regards"	cAnON.	Anna Pingina	4:12
Total length:				48:34

Darling in the Franxx Original Soundtrack Volume 3
No.	Title	Length
1.	"CODE:016"	2:29
2.	"RoCco"	1:59
3.	"Lotus"	1:59
4.	"CODE:001"	2:26
5.	"CoiL"	3:16
6.	"DESPAIR"	2:25
7.	"InVaDeR"	2:44
8.	"GLADIOLUS"	3:52
9.	"JUSTICE"	2:20
10.	"Requiem"	2:55
11.	"Cherry blossoms"	2:23
12.	"HIRO and ZERO TWO"	3:41
13.	"cÅGE -piano ver.-"	1:57
14.	"JUSTICE -Epiano ver.-"	2:28
15.	"Pray for.."	5:49
16.	"cÅGE -SPS ver.-"	2:43
17.	"FUSE -instrumental-"	3:01
18.	"Battle Cry -instrumental-"	3:30
19.	"Vanquish -instrumental-"	2:40
20.	"D#regards -instrumental-"	4:12
21.	"cÅGE -instrumental-"	4:55
22.	"Torikago (BGM-Rearrange) -guitar ver.-" (composed by Katsuhiko Sugiyama, arranged by Kohta Yamamoto)	2:56
Total length:		1:06:40

== Reception ==
=== Critical response ===
Reception to Darling in the Franxx in English-language media was mixed. Some reviews praised the large focus of the series on its coming-of-age and romance elements. Other themes with a more mixed or negative reception involved the heavy sexual innuendos of teenagers, the lack of plot development regarding the alien species VIRM, the plot twists of the second half of the series, and the rushed pacing of the storyline following episode 15. Eric Van Allen of Kotaku described the series as having "moments of brilliance" with solid work on the early mech fights and the character of Zero Two, but disliked the plot developments in the second half of the series and the ending. Kyle Rogacion of Goomba Stomp called the series "an endearing character-driven coming-of-age story" but criticized it for having by the end "eschewed everything that made it great and settled for the easy way out." Random Curiosity voiced a more positive opinion to its ending, stating the series will be "well-remembered for seasons to come" and "kept us all fixated and eagerly anticipating every episode set to air."

=== Awards and nominations ===
At Newtype Anime Awards 2018, Shigeto Koyama was awarded Best Mechanical Design, with Zero Two and the series itself being runners-up for Best Female Character and Best TV Anime, respectively.

Year	Award	Category	Recipient(s)	Result	Ref.
2018	8th Newtype Anime Awards	Best TV Anime	Darling in the Franxx	Runner-up	
2018	8th Newtype Anime Awards	Best Character (Male)	Hiro	Nominated	
2018	8th Newtype Anime Awards	Best Character (Female)	Zero Two	Runner-up	
2018	8th Newtype Anime Awards	Best Voice Actor	Yūto Uemura as Hiro	Nominated	
2018	8th Newtype Anime Awards	Best Voice Actor	Yūichirō Umehara as Goro	Nominated	
2018	8th Newtype Anime Awards	Best Voice Actress	Haruka Tomatsu as Zero Two	Nominated	
2018	8th Newtype Anime Awards	Best Theme Song	"Kiss of Death" by Mika Nakashima	Nominated	
2018	8th Newtype Anime Awards	Best Soundtrack	Asami Tachibana	Nominated	
2018	8th Newtype Anime Awards	Best Director	Atsushi Nishigori	Nominated	
2018	8th Newtype Anime Awards	Best Screenplay	Atsushi Nishigori and Naotaka Hayashi	Nominated	
2018	8th Newtype Anime Awards	Best Character Design	Masayoshi Tanaka	Nominated	
2018	8th Newtype Anime Awards	Best Mechanical Design	Shigeto Koyama	Won	
2019	3rd Crunchyroll Anime Awards	Best Opening Sequence	"Kiss of Death" by Mika Nakashima x Hyde	Won	
2019	3rd Crunchyroll Anime Awards	Best Voice Artist Performance (English)	Tia Ballard as Zero Two	Nominated	
2019	Funimation	Best Girls of the Decade	Zero Two	Won	

== See also ==
- Mecha anime and manga
