= List of Baka and Test episodes =

Baka and Test Japanese DVD volume 1 cover

Baka and Test, known in Japan as Baka to Test to Shōkanjū, is an anime series produced by Silver Link based on the light novel series by Kenji Inoue. In a school in which students are able to summon beasts powered by their test scores, with higher scores resulting in ritzier lifestyles, the series revolves around a group of students stuck in the lowest-ranked F class. The first season aired in Japan between January 7 and March 31, 2010. On March 4, 2010, Funimation Entertainment announced that it had acquired the anime and streamed simulcast subtitled episodes days after they aired in Japan under the title Baka and Test – Summon the Beasts. Two OVA episodes under the title Baka to Test to Shoukanjuu: Matsuri. were released in two BD/DVD volumes: the first on February 23, 2011, and the second on March 30, 2011. Both OVA come with 2-3 different ending sequences. A second anime season under the title Baka to Test to Shoukanjuu Ni! began airing in Japan on July 8, 2011.

The first anime season had three pieces of theme music: one opening theme and two ending themes. The opening theme is "Perfect-area Complete!" by Natsuko Aso, composed by Kenichi Maeyamada. The first ending theme is "Baka Go Home" by Milktub and BakaTest All Stars. The second ending theme is "Hare Tokidoki Egao" by Hitomi Harada, Kaori Mizuhashi, Emiri Katou and Tomomi Isomura. The Matsuri OVAs had one opening theme and one ending theme. The opening theme is "Ren'ai Kōjō Committee" (恋愛向上committee) by Natsuko Aso, and the ending theme is "Getsuyō wa Kirai" (月曜はキライ) by Milktub. The second anime season has one opening theme and one ending theme. The opening theme is "Kimi+Nazo+Watashi de Jump!!" (君+謎+私でJUMP!!) by Larval Stage Planning, made up of I've Sound singers Airi Kirishima, Nami Maisaki, and Rin Asami. The ending theme is "Eureka Baby" (エウレカベイビー) by Natsuko Aso. Funimation has also licensed the second season and the Matsuri OVA's, as with the first, they will simulcast the second series, followed by a Blu-ray and DVD release in 2012. The second season by Funimation was initially released on January 15, 2013; however, an error on the box art caused a recall and a rerelease date. The official release date of the Funimation DVD/Blu-ray box set was January 29, 2013.

== Episodes ==
=== Baka to Test to Shōkanjū (2010) ===
No.	Title	Original release date
1	"Idiots, Classes, and a Summoning War"; Transliteration: "Baka to Kurasu to Shōkan Sensō" (Japanese: バカとクラスと召喚戦争)	January 6, 2010
Mizuki Himeji, whose intellect could make her the second most intelligent student in the school, appears in Class F. Akihisa Yoshii worries for her fragile state of health and plans with Yūji Sakamoto to defeat Class A, but in order to do that, they have to fight the lower classes, and they start with Class E.
2	"Lilies, Roses, and Physical Education"; Transliteration: "Yuri to Bara to Hoken Taiiku" (Japanese: ユリとバラと保健体育)	January 13, 2010
Class A calls out Class F, and there is some bad blood in the past between members of the groups. Shōko Kirishima, the Class A's representative, demands that the losing class would do one single thing for the winning class, to which Yūji agrees. However, before she voices her demand, she moves closer to Mizuki.
3	"Food Expenses, Dates, and Stun Guns"; Transliteration: "Shokuhi to Dēto to Sutangan" (Japanese: 食費とデートとスタンガン)	January 20, 2010
Akihisa, Mizuki, and Minami go to the movies, only to bump into Yūji and Shōko doing the same, although Yūji himself cannot escape due to her tazing him every chance he gets to escape. Next Sunday they go again to the movies, again bumping with Yūji and Shōko. At the crepe shop, both Mizuki and Minami try to feed Akihisa with their crepes, but Miharu Shimizu, a girl who has a lesbian attraction to Minami, does not take it facing down.
4	"Love, Spice, and Boxed Lunches"; Transliteration: "Ai to Supaisu to Obentō" (Japanese: 愛とスパイスとお弁当)	January 27, 2010
After supplementary lessons in a Sunday morning, Minami claims to have made too much lunch (actually she woke up early and made it) when her younger sister, Hazuki Shimada, brought with to school to share with Akihisa, Mizuki also has made a boxed lunch for him to try, much to the angst of the FFF Inquisition. And as they are sitting at the rooftop, Yūji, Kōta and Hideyoshi try her cooking, only to go nearly out cold due to her food.
5	"Map, Treasures, and Striker Sigma V"; Transliteration: "Chizu to Takara to Sutoraikā Shiguma Faibu" (Japanese: 地図と宝とストライカー・シグマV)	February 3, 2010
Kaoru Tōdō, the principal of Fumizuki Academy, initiates a treasure hunting event in which the grand prize is a mystery item. Each class is divided into groups of three. Akihisa is paired up with Yūji and Hideyoshi, and teams must solve all papers that have the coordinates. Akihisa then solely relies on his coded pencils and a certain pencil. There are features from Gundam Seed and Gundam Seed Destiny shown in this episode(When Kōta Tsuchiya is in SEED mode).
6	"Me, the Pool, Swimsuit Paradise...and..."; Transliteration: "Boku to Pūru to Mizugi no Rakuen――to" (Japanese: 僕とプールと水着の楽園――と、)	February 10, 2010
Yūji visits Akihisa, only to have a skirmish and finally tries to bathe in the pool, but was stopped by Sōichi Nishimura. As they were told to clean the pool next Saturday, Yūji invites Mizuki, Minami, Hideyoshi, and Kōta to help along. He also invites Shōko, out of fear of what she will do to him when she learns of their event, and also, Hazuki, Minami's little sister, decides to tag along as well (and later, Aiko and Miharu). Hilarity and chaos ensues in the swimming pool and the outdoor baths ensues as the idiots irrevocably cause the eruption of embarrassing and disturbing mishaps and accidents.
7	"Me, Shōko, and Kisaragi Grand Park"; Transliteration: "Ore to Shōko to Kisaragi Gurando Pāku" (Japanese: 俺と翔子と如月グランドパーク)	February 17, 2010
Shōko appears in Yūji's bedroom to convince him to go with her to the Kisaragi Grand Park, or rather forcing him into going by burning all of his adult magazines, in order to participate in the mock wedding event by showing him the premium ticket. Yūji, on the other hand, isn't so willing and curses Akihisa for giving her the ticket. As they go to the park, the group of friends are there to support them by working part time. Worse yet, an obnoxious couple keeps annoying Yūji and Shōko with their stupid tricks, and the other idiots as well.
8	"Runaway, Mazes, and the Summoned Beast Instrumentality Project"; Transliteration: "Bōsō to Meikyū to Shōkanjū Hokan Keikaku" (Japanese: 暴走と迷宮と召喚獣補完計画)	February 24, 2010
The first we have Minami fussing over a photo in Akihisa's hand, then challenging him to a mock ESB, but the ESB field glitches, and the beings are acting weird, especially Akihisa's, and have taken adult versions of themselves. Kaoru sends Akihisa in, with his friends in the control room guiding him. But little did he know what he was going to face as his shōkanjū clambers up the vent entrance. This episode pays homage to the popular Neon Genesis Evangelion series. This is evident in the episode's name, the mock command center, and other various features (along with a Code Geass reference).
9	"Kisses, Busts, and Ponytails"; Transliteration: "Kisu to Basuto to Ponītēru" (Japanese: キスとバストとポニーテール)	March 3, 2010
Akihisa's sister, Akira Yoshii, comes to his house to check up on him, and checking to see if there are evidences of any girls in his life besides her, much to his angst. Things go from bad to worse for him when his friends suspect him of hiding something, and Mizuki, who now was acting strange after Kōta stated that he might have a girlfriend, wants to enter his room. Then as they reach the door, a surprise awaits them which can test both Mizuki and Minami's denial.
10	"Mock Exams, Phantom Thieves, and Love Letters"; Transliteration: "Moshi to kaitō to Rabu Retā" (Japanese: 模試と怪盗とラブレター)	March 10, 2010
Mizuki tries to give Akihisa her love letter, but complications arise when things go wrong when she tries. It gets worse when her love letter, along with the inner circle's own belongings are stored along with the mock tests in the vault. Then Kyōji Nemoto appears to help them in their time of need, but ends up mocking the students of F class.
11	"Rivals, Love Poems, and Blitzkrieg"; Transliteration: "Shukuteki to Koibumi to Dengeki Sakusen" (Japanese: 宿敵と恋文と電撃作戦)	March 17, 2010
Class F begins to strike by fighting Class D, only to win and is pitted against Class B. Nemoto, the Class B's representative, resorts to sneaky underhanded tactics to try to win, by demoralizing Class F through trashing their room and affect Mizuki by tearing open her love letter. Akihisa, now enraged, attempts a stunt that could change the outcome of the war between Classes B and F through his being.
12	"Love, Courage, and Our Battle Has Just Begun! (Temporary)"; Transliteration: "Ai to yūki to Oretachi no Tatakai wa Kore kara da! Kakko Kari" (Japanese: 愛と勇気と俺達の戦いはこれからだ!(仮))	March 24, 2010
Class F created a plan to defeat Class A, which involves the other classes wearing down Class A.. After running around, they went to the roof, but it got damaged and half of the roof got destroyed. Mizuki hugged Akihisa after saving her from falling. But the moment ended when Yuko, appeared after falling and defeat Yuuji's avatar, leaving class A the victor.
13	"Idiots, Tests, and Summoned Beasts"; Transliteration: "Baka to Tesuto to Shōkanjū" (Japanese: バカとテストと召喚獣)	March 31, 2010
After the events in the previous episode, Akihisa manages to convince the principal to change Mizuki's class, but before he was about to be rejected, Shōko and Yūko appear to ask for a rematch since the victory was cheap. Akihisa decides to fight alone, but this time, it's for Mizuki. Shōko has other plans for Yūji if she wins through a marriage contract.

=== Baka to Test to Shōkanjū Matsuri (OVA) ===
No.	Title	Original release date
1	"Day 1: Me, Maids, and a New Chapter"; Transliteration: "Ichinichime Boku to Meido to Aratanaru Tabidachi" (Japanese: 1日目「僕とメイドと新たなる旅立ち」)	February 23, 2011
Class F works on a Chinese maid café for the school's cultural festival. At first, the plan works out okay, but soon the Tonkonatsu duo come along and accidentally eat one of the sample sesame balls, which were made by Himeji's terrible cooking skills. Accusing them of trying to kill them, Yūji uses "Persuasive Negotiations" in the forms of "Persuasive Negations using Fists", "Persuasive Negations using Kicks" and "Persuasive Negations using Wrestling", which drives away the duo. After their departure, business starts to fail. Minami's little sister arrives, promising to help. She tells them that while she was looking Akihisa, people tell her bad rumors about the Chinese cafe. Yūji deducts that the failure of their business is because the Tonkonatsu duo is spreading ill rumors about them. This is confirmed with a visit to class A's Maid Cafe, while watching the Tonkonatsu duo shouting out the rumors. Akihisa and Yūji hatch a plan to ruin the duo's image, (which involves Akihisa wearing a maid costume) and works greatly. The duo does not appreciate this, and kidnap Hideyoshi. Akihisa misinterprets and thinks they kidnapped Himeji and Minami. The Duo states that they are going to "have their fun with them". They then use Kōta's various hidden cameras and audio cameras to find the duo in the athletic's storage. Akihisa storms toward the storage still in the maid outfit, and punches the duo. He awkwardly finds Hideyoshi playing a board game (she also explains that Minami and Himeji are at the cafe). At the end of the day, their Chinese Cafe earns enough money to buy the equipment they want (with the help of Kōta and his "deluxe photo collection"), but they can only buy the equipment under one condition: they must win a Summoning Contest. Kōta announces the favorite maid of the day, and it was Akihisa. Both Himeji, Minami and Hideyoshi ponder over this, while Akihisa freaks out over the said results.
2	"Day 2: Idiots, Fireworks, and the Summoning Contest"; Transliteration: "Futsukame Baka to Hanabi to Shōkan Taikai" (Japanese: 2日目「バカと花火と召喚大会」)	March 30, 2011
Class F enters a summoned beast tournament in the hopes of winning better desks for their classroom. As they progress in the Summoning Tournament, they use tricks to win most of their battles, such as when they attempt to force Yūji into admitting he loves Shōko, but Yūji's resistance leads to his eventual unconsciousness and Akihisa using him as a puppet, with Hideyoshi using a voice muzzler to imitate Yūji's voice. Throughout the course of the tournament, Yūji suspects that someone is sabotaging the tournament, leading them to battle Classes B & A. In the end, The Tonkonatsu Duo are revealed to be the ones committing the said sabotage. Yūji secretly calls Pervert to cheat as well, changing the subject from the intended English to Japanese History, the only subject Akihisa studied hard for. They soon defeat them, but they run of to the PA system to reveal each other's cheating to change the win of Akihisa and Yūji into a stalemate, which defeats the purpose of them entering the tournament. Akihisa then runs after them, using a firework launcher to try and shoot them down. In the end, he accidentally bumped one of the other firework launchers, ending the night in a fiery blaze while Iron Man takes them both to their punishment. In the end, they had exhausted all their money compensating for the damage, and are saddened also since Mizuki will transfer to another school. However, when Mizuki reveals that she will not transfer, the entire gang, including Akihisa, are relieved.

=== Baka to Test to Shōkanjū Ni! (2011) ===
No.	Title	Original release date
1	"Me, Everyone, and Swimming in the Ocean!"; Transliteration: "Boku to Minna to Kaisuiyoku!" (Japanese: 僕とみんなと海水浴っ!)	July 8, 2011
Akihisa, Mizuki, Minami, Yūji, Hideyoshi, Kōta, Shōko, Aiko, and Akira head to the beach for an overnight stay after Akihisa finally convinces his sister to let the girls go along. Soon after, Akihisa and Yūji attempt to hit on girls...that would affect what would happen to them later.
2	"Me, a Yukata, and Festivities!"; Transliteration: "Boku to Yukata to Omatsurisawagi!" (Japanese: 僕と浴衣とお祭り騒ぎっ!)	July 15, 2011
The group then goes to the ongoing festival held, and Akihisa notices the yukata contest that is to happen. The girls take this opportunity to punish the boys fully... by letting them enter the contest while crossdressing.
3	"Me, That Girl, and a Stuffed Toy!"; Transliteration: "Boku to Ano Ko to Nuigurumi!" (Japanese: 僕とあの娘とぬいぐるみっ!)	July 22, 2011
Hideyoshi and Yūko decide to switch roles for the time being since she cannot sing, and various rumors and suspicions are spread at the end of the day. The second part rolls back on how Akihisa met Hazuki, became the Punishment Inspector, and getting the affections of both Minami and Hazuki.
4	"Me, My True Colors, and a Man's Dignity!"; Transliteration: "Boku to Honne to Otoko no Songen!" (Japanese: 僕と本音と男の尊厳っ!)	July 29, 2011
In the first part, Akihisa, Yūji, Kōta and Hideyoshi play a customized version of doubt. Mizuki arrives to talk with the guys but to no avail and eats a chocolate that she received, then starts acting very strange while still smiling... to the point of scaring Akihisa. Second part has the shōkanjūs become sentient, but the chibis also reveal exactly what their summoners are thinking...
5	"Me, Peeking, and Training Camp!"; Transliteration: "Boku to Nozoki to Kyōka Gasshuku!" (Japanese: 僕とのぞきと強化合宿っ!)	August 5, 2011
Blackmailed by an unknown assailant, Akihisa and Yūji decide to find the culprit among the girls with the help of Kōta and Hideyoshi, their only clue being that of a burn left by culprit's mother's punishment. Before the group could continue further, a group of girls arrive in their room and say THEY installed a micro videocam in the girls' changing room.
6	"Me, Peeking, and Male Friendship!"; Transliteration: "Boku to Nozoki to Otoko no Yūjō!" (Japanese: 僕とのぞきと男の友情っ!)	August 12, 2011
Failing in the previous encounter due to the strong defense, Akihisa, Yūji, Kōta and Hideyoshi plan another breakthrough by inspiring the males of both their own and the other classes to reach the girls bathroom. However, the quartet was able to get classes D and E to help out, and the plan would ultimately backfire once again.
7	"Me, Peeking, and a Far Away Paradise!"; Transliteration: "Boku to Nozoki to Harukanaru Tōgenkyō!" (Japanese: 僕とのぞきと遥かなる桃源郷っ!)	August 19, 2011
On the last night of the training camp after failing to peep on the girls bath yet again, the boys have one last hope to do it. They enlist the boys of every other class by giving them pictures of Himeji in her bath robe, inciting them with enough lust to get them on their side. Meanwhile, Akihisa accidentally sends Minami a text message that appears to be a love confession. Akihisa fights Iron Man and finds out the blackmailer was Miharu. The battle is won, but after only seeing the principal washing herself, all 2nd year boys are suspended for a period of one week. On the returning day of school, Minami kisses Akihisa to his and Himeji's shock without any warning.
8	"Me, Japan, and the Language I`m Unfamiliar With"; Transliteration: "Uchi to Nippon to Shiranai Kotoba" (Japanese: ウチと日本と知らない言葉)	August 26, 2011
In this episode Minami tells her story, and how she met Akihisa, At first she doesn't understand a lot of Japanese, but she tries her best to understand it. When Akihisa first walks up to her in class he asks her to be friends in French, mixing up French for German, but Minami jumps to conclusions and misunderstands him. At the end of the episode Minami finds out what he is saying and tell him that Minami and Akihisa can be friends.
9	"Me, Romance, and Diplomacy!"; Transliteration: "Boku to Koiji to Kōshō-jutsu!" (Japanese: 僕と恋路と交渉術っ!)	September 2, 2011
The episode kicks off after Minami kisses Akihisa in front of Mizuki, and things get complicated in their relationship. Meanwhile, there is evidence that there may by a war between classes F, D, and B, as Miharu is jealous of Akihisa's and Minami's "relationship", and Nemoto wanting revenge on Class F for humiliating him.
10	"Me, Romance, and the Art of Love!"; Transliteration: "Boku to Koiji to Ren'ai-jutsu!" (Japanese: 僕と恋路と恋愛術っ!)	September 9, 2011
After the turbulence between Akihisa and Minami, Miharu is confronted by Akihisa (in hopes to anger her for an ESB). Akihisa successfully enrages Miharu for a battle on the school roof. After Akihisa gains the upper hand, he is "betrayed" by his classmates and attacked. Yūji strikes a truce with Miharu. It is revealed in the epilogue, Akihisa admits his true feelings about Minami through a tape Voyeur secretly recorded. Minami overhears this tape outside the classroom and later admits to her sister "Your sister has fallen hard for someone...".
11	"Yūji, Shōko, and their Childhood Memories"; Transliteration: "Yūji to Shōko to Osanai Omoide" (Japanese: 雄二と翔子と幼い思い出)	September 16, 2011
Yūji and Shōko reminisce about an elementary school (5th grade) memory. Yūji, at the time, was considered a genius, surpassing 6th graders, and was very overconfident and selfish. A trio of jealous 6th graders try to blackmail Yūji by writing "I cheated on all of my tests" on his P.E. uniform. Shōko, already in love with Yūji, tries to stop them. However, she fails and is bullied. Yūji notices them, and decides to save Shōko, by fighting the 6th graders. Later that day, Yūji comes home beaten, and Shōko explains to his mother. Yūji's mother then lets little Shōko know that she is rooting for Shōko to gain Yūji's love.
12	"Idiots, Fools, and Requiem!"; Transliteration: "Baka to Dōke to Rekuiemu!" (Japanese: バカと道化と鎮魂歌っ!)	September 23, 2011
The enemies from the past return to have a little revenge. Being embarrassed by students a year lower than them some time ago, the Tokonatsu duo somewhat thought of a little way to get some payback. The system in the school, already being a little broken again for the third time, gave their principal an idea to give the students a way to settle their little fight. They decided to have a little RPG like game, on where a pair of two each time enters areas where they have to defeat the enemies en route to the final destination. The episode ends with an unfinished game and Tsunemura confessing to Hideyoshi, who screams and gets his team disqualified.
13	"Idiots, Tests, and Summoned Beasts!"; Transliteration: "Baka to Tesuto to Shōkanjū!" (Japanese: バカとテストと召喚獣っ!)	September 30, 2011
As the 2nd years' forces are dwindling, Minami and Akihisa enter the battlefield. After escaping from Miharu, Minami faints from fear. As a result, Akihisa lets her rest and goes with Mizuki. As Mizuki is telling off Akihisa for calling her a princess, the room becomes pitch black and Akihisa then pairs with Yuuji, while Mizuki finds Shōko. As the Tokonatsu duo prepare to battle the pair of girls, Mizuki screams at the seniors for degrading Akihisa and Yuuji, causing the girls to get eliminated. After hearing Mizuki, Akihisa and Yuuji battle the Tsunemura and Natsukawa. After outwitting the Todonatsu duo, Akihisa and Yuuji win. Afterwards, Akihisa apologizes to Mizuki, who forgives him, requests that he calls her by first name, and kisses his cheek, telling him that her crush from season 1 (Akihisa himself) is still strong. Afterwards, Minami comes and asks why Akihisa didn't stay with her, causing misunderstanding and confusion, and Akihisa is chased by the girls. Yuuji also runs away from Shōko, who demands marriage for not finishing the challenge with her. Then, all the students and Iron Man run outside in a circle.
