= List of Baka and Test characters =

The characters of the Baka and Test series were created by Kenji Inoue, with illustration and character design by Yui Haga. The story centers on a boy named Akihisa Yoshii, also known as the idiot or "baka" of the title. He attends Fumizuki Academy, a school where the staff rigidly divides its students based on the results of their academic scores.

== Second-Year Students ==
=== Class F ===
The worst class with the worst facilities, including decrepit tables (later changed into upturned cardboard boxes then to large clipboards with rope to hold them up), tatami mats and under-stuffed sitting cushions; 47 males, 2 females, and Hideyoshi make up the class. There is a total of 149 boys enrolled in the second-year class, so approximately one-third are in Class 2-F.

Akihisa Yoshii (吉井 明久, Yoshii Akihisa)
Voiced by: Hiro Shimono (Japanese); Jessie James Grelle (English)
Akihisa Yoshii is the protagonist of the story and acts as the first-person narrator in the novels. He is portrayed as the Ultimate Idiot (Baka among all Baka) and is implied to have the worst grades among his peers of the same level. In the novels, his friends make fun of his idiocy by turning his name, by appending the suffix "-ful", into an English adjective; "He is so Akihisaful" essentially means "He is so stupid" in the context of the novels. Because of his absolute idiocy, he is also given the title of Punishment Inspector (Probationary Student in the English Dub of the Anime) (観察処分者, Kansatsu Shobunsha) and his Shōkanjū (Summoned Being) is the only Shōkanjū given the ability to touch corporeal objects in order to help the teachers with chores as punishment for being the Ultimate Idiot. Because Shōkanjū are many times stronger than humans, Akihisa can help the teachers perform tasks that would normally require the strength of many people. The flip side to this "special ability" is the "feedback", which means that any damage taken by his Shōkanjū will be transmitted to himself as well (so if the Shōkanjū ("Avatar") was punched in the gut, he would feel the same pain there). Thus, he is always reluctant to fight Shōkanjū battles due to the pain he would receive during battle. However, because he is accustomed to controlling his Shōkanjū, compared to the other students, his Shōkanjū is unmatched in speed, is more agile, and can execute many unorthodox moves (such as sliding attacks), and this has enabled him to win battles otherwise thought to be impossible due to his poor grades.
His Shōkanjū's ability to touch corporeal objects is also instrumental in helping his class defeat Class 2-B in Volume 1. Despite being an idiot, Akihisa is generally polite and well mannered among his friends. Yuuji is Akihisa’s closest guy friend and confidant, though they also share a rivalry with one another and tend to play tricks on each other. Akihisa's parents are on long-term overseas work assignments and send money back regularly. However, he always spends this money on the latest games, and as a result, he has to live on merely salt, sugar, and water. In the anime, he is depicted to survive on a sub-divided piece of cup noodles which can be as small as 1/64 of the entire piece. Akihisa has many romantic admirers both female and male, including Mizuki Himeji, Minami Shimada, Hazuki Shimada, Toshimitsu Kubo, and Akira Yoshii (his sister), but is oblivious to this due to his idiocy. Everyone around him is aware of this, as shown when his older sister showed the two girls his fetish and Mizuki tried to attract him by tying her hair, but he still was thickheaded about her feelings. It is also suggested in the anime that both Mizuki and Minami are acting like his girlfriends, unbeknownst to him, and as they do they will try to burn any R18+ magazines he has. A running gag throughout the series is that he is attracted to Hideyoshi Kinoshita due to Hideyoshi's very feminine appearance, going so far as to frequently fawn over him and comment about how hot he is. Despite the fact that they always sabotage each other's reputation, Akihisa has a close friendship with Yūji and can communicate with him just by glances and without any words. Akihisa is also the class ambassador of Class 2-F, appointed by Yūji.
Akihisa also has excellent cooking skills, as a result of having to fend for himself because he lives alone, and is good at housework. His favorite dish to make and eat is paella. After the tournament in Volume 2, Akihisa acquired the platinum bracelet that lets him perform dual summons, allowing him to have two Shōkanjū in a battle. Since Akira started living with Akihisa, his grades have seen a significant improvement from what they were before since he has more incentive to study. His Shōkanjū wears a school uniform and wields a bokken. During the ESB field error, his Shōkanjū was unaffected, but it multiplied enough to literally flow out of the school itself.
Mizuki Himeji (姫路 瑞希, Himeji Mizuki)
Voiced by: Hitomi Harada (Japanese); Alexis Tipton (English)
Mizuki Himeji is the principal female character and one of the smartest students in Fumizuki Academy and would have probably ranked second in her level if not for her inability to finish her placement exam due to her fever. In Fumizuki Academy, leaving in the middle of an exam gets a student zero, regardless of the reason. As a result, Mizuki was placed in the worst class, Class 2-F. Despite the poor conditions of her class which were unfavourable to her fragile health, she claims to be happy because her love interest, Akihisa Yoshii, is in the same class. Mizuki is also portrayed as a shy, timid, innocent, yet ambitious young girl, with a very well-developed bust size (an 'F-Cup' in Japan; equivalent to a 'DD-Cup' in the US). Akihisa and Mizuki used to be in the same elementary school, and since then, she has long admired Akihisa for his thoughtfulness and caring personality. Mizuki also finds Akihisa cute, especially in maid costumes, and was overcome by some sort of weakness when she first saw him wearing a maid costume (when he was chased by Miharu and bumped into Hideyoshi who had some costumes with him). Towards the end of Volume 2, Mizuki changes her way of addressing Akihisa from Yoshii-kun (吉井くん) to Akihisa-kun (明久くん). At the end of Volume 8, Mizuki kisses Akihisa to get him to stay home while he is sick, despite Classes F and C having an exam war that day.
Even though she has both brains and beauty, Mizuki's cooking is lethal, and in the novel anyone who eats her handmade cooking goes into a coma, including Hideyoshi Kinoshita who is known for his strong stomach. However, she is completely oblivious to the lethality of her own cooking because she does not taste her cooking, and as stated in the novels she adds several chemicals that will create even more potent acids such as the Aqua Regia and hydrochloric acid, also when asked by Yoshii when Yūji, Hideyoshi and Kōta went nearly out cold due to her cooking. She is on particularly good terms with Minami, calling her Minami-chan (美波ちゃん) (by her given name), despite the fact that they are love-rivals. Often, she will emit a killing intent aura and yandere-like eyes whenever she hears that Akihisa is with some other woman, like when Yūji claimed that Akihisa was with a college girl. She will also exhibit extreme denial if she finds any evidence of a girl in his life, such as when she saw his sister's clothes hanging in his apartment—saying that they were "not his size"; to her claiming that a make-up removing cotton puff on his table was a fish cake. This side of her tends to increase more and more as the series goes on. In the anime, it is sometimes suggested that she acts like Akihisa's girlfriend and will try to burn any R18+ magazines he has, along with the aid of Minami.
Her Shōkanjū is clad in heavy armor and wields a large sword. During the ESB field error, her Shōkanjū looks like an adult version of herself, while wearing the costume resembling Morrigan Aensland from Darkstalkers. Not to mention that her Shōkanjū's older version is displaying a noticeable exceptional growth in her bust size, which to Mizuki, embarrasses her to no end. Also, in the first theme song, she is holding a six-sided die in mid-air. The kana on its sides spell out "バカとテスト", or "Baka to Tesuto", which is the name of the show.
Minami Shimada (島田 美波, Shimada Minami)
Voiced by: Kaori Mizuhashi (Japanese); Leah Clark (English)
Minami Shimada is one of the two female students in Class 2-F. She is Japanese but spent most of her life in Germany before coming to Fumizuki Academy, and as a result she is especially weak in kanji. Because of this handicap, the only exam in which she can do well in is math (which still isn't as good as Class 2-A's, due to the presence of word problems). She will also revert to speaking German whenever she's in shock. Minami is the tsundere of the series. Physically, she is slim and has long legs, and can be considered pretty attractive. However, she's somewhat lacking in the 'chest department' (an 'A-Cup' in Japan {she has stated, if they're lifted, they're probably a 'B-Cup'}; equivalent to a 'AA-Cup' in the US {or as she stated, probably an 'A-cup' in US}) and isn't a Valley Girl at all. Due to this, she's often being envious of Mizuki's large bust size, showing an inferiority complex about it (in the anime). Like Mizuki, she too is in love with Akihisa, but due to her inability to express herself and her tsundere nature, she acts violently towards him, often leading him to misunderstand her intentions. During the class battles in Volume 1, while executing a delay tactic, Akihisa indirectly defamed Minami and landed herself in the list of "Top Ten Women Not To Date" among the guys in Fumizuki.
In the novel and manga, during a battle in which Akihisa's survival depended on Minami, he was blackmailed to address Minami by her given name, and from then onwards, she started calling him Aki (アキ), instead of Yoshii (吉井), while he would refer to her by her given name as well. Whereas, in the anime, this took place when she threatened to break his bones. It is a running gag in the light novel series that whenever Minami expresses genuine concern for Akihisa through her actions or words, Akihisa always draws the conclusion that he is going to be killed or sabotaged by her in some obscure way. Even though they are love-rivals, Minami is on good terms with Mizuki, the only other girl in Class 2-F, and calling her by her given name as well. She's also good at cooking, due to the fact that her parents are not at home most of the time. Like Mizuki (in the anime), it is also suggested that she acts like Akihisa's girlfriend and will try to burn any pornographic magazines that he has. In Episode 7 of Season 2, Akihisa accidentally sends her what appears to be a confession of love through texting, this later causes her to attack him in his sleep, and she ambushes him with a kiss at the end of the credits.
Her Shōkanjū is clad in a blue naval military uniform and wields a saber. During the ESB field error, her Shōkanjū looks like an adult version of herself, while wearing a costume similar to Lilith's. Unfortunately, her Shōkanjū's older version still lacks in the bust size, which Akihisa points out (that nothing has really changed).
Yūji Sakamoto (坂本 雄二, Sakamoto Yūji)
Voiced by: Tatsuhisa Suzuki (Japanese); Scott Freeman (English)
Yūji Sakamoto is a red-haired boy, the class representative of Class 2-F, and, together with Yoshii, make up the main comedic duo of the series. In the series, the class representative position is assigned to Yuji as he is the smartest student of that class. He is cool, collected, and exhibit surprisingly high intelligence and foresight unexpected of a student from Class 2-F. A master strategist, Yuji generally comes up with the battle plans during class wars. In Volume 1, his strategies and tactics helped Class 2-F to attain victory after victory, until the duels with Class 2-A in which he overestimated his ability in elementary school-level Japanese history. Yūji was once known as a child prodigy in his childhood. The only reason he ended up in Class F was that he did not study at all and he holds the strong belief that grades are not everything. However, due to the consequences he 'suffered' from his defeat from Shōko Kirishima(his childhood friend and the top student of his level), he became motivated to study again. In the later volumes, his Shōkanjū became reasonably strong in just a few months due to his test scores improving by leaps and bounds. It is implied that he is actually smarter than his childhood friend, Shōko but shows little to no interest in advancing to a higher ranked class.
After the tournament in Volume 2, he acquires a platinum bracelet which allows him to control the size of the force field of his Shōkanjū, allowing him to form a one-man army since humans cannot pass through this force field. He bears no ill intention towards Shōko, but due to Shōko's unyielding obsession with marrying Yūji since their childhood days, he sees her as having a few loose screws in her mind, and fears to even think of his future if he did marry her. In the anime, it is suggested that they act like a married couple though she tends to treat him as a slave in order for him not to escape her. Despite this, he does actually think well of Shōko and it is implied to have feelings for her himself, although he denies this. Yūji is close to Akihisa to the point where they can actually communicate without any words. A gag in the series is that Yūji will attempt to decipher a complicated expression on Akihisa and comment on a series of events that must have taken place. While he meant it as a joke, he is always a spot-on when this happens.
His Shōkanjū wears a long trench coat that makes it look like a punk, and is armed with brass knuckles. During the ESB field error, his Shōkanjū becomes a handsome adult version of himself, wearing a school uniform with an open collar, much to Shōko's delight.
Hideyoshi Kinoshita (木下 秀吉, Kinoshita Hideyoshi)
Voiced by: Emiri Katō (Japanese); Brina Palencia (English)
Hideyoshi Kinoshita is a chilled and very feminine-looking bishōnen and is the younger twin brother of Yūko Kinoshita of Class 2-A. Despite being a fraternal twin, except for his male body, he looks almost identical to his twin sister. Because of that, his male peers, and many of his female peers, see him as a female, which upsets him though he doesn't express it strongly. In the anime, his feminine looks are often the subject of fanservice, going so far as to make him strongly appear as a female. In one episode, he was found to have his own school locker room, and even a separate bathhouse due to society acknowledging him as his own gender. Hideyoshi has a helpful personality and is willing to support any activity his friends embark on. He uses the term 'Washi (儂)', used by old venerable men to describe himself. While he is bad in academics, he has unquestionable talent in acting, and can not only replicate the behavior and mannerisms of other people but also their voices as well. He also can dress instantly on the spot. In Volume 2, he was instigated by Akihisa to mimic Yūji's voice to propose to Shōko during their tournament, confusing her and ultimately setting up the stage for a win for Akihisa-Yūji Team, but this move caused Yūji all manner of problems later on.
His Shōkanjū is clad in Hakama and wields a Naginata. During the ESB field error, his Shōkanjū turns into an adult version of 'himself', but changes gender and wears a dress that parodies Little Red Riding Hood.
On a side note, he had appeared in the top 10 popular characters in Kono Light Novel ga Sugoi! for both male and female category in the 2009-2010 listings, having been ranked in first place for the male category two years in a row, while placing tenth place for the female category in the 2009 listing and seventh place the following year.
Kōta Tsuchiya (土屋 康太, Tsuchiya Kōta)
Voiced by: Kōki Miyata (Japanese); Greg Ayres (English)
Kōta Tsuchiya is the ultimate ecchi in Fumizuki. He has a dark taciturn personality, and as such, he's given the nickname Morose Pervert Muttsurīni (ムッツリーニ), implicitly derived from Muttsuri (むっつり) to form a parody for Benito Mussolini (ムッソリーニ). It has been shown in one of the episodes of season one that he sells copies of pictures of the girls and Hideyoshi, with Akihisa being his "Loyal customer". But even though he is very perverted, nobody, even the girls, seem to mind this side of him. While Kōta is uncommunicative by nature, he is part of Class 2-F's inner circle group of Yūji, Akihisa, Mizuki, Minami, and Hideyoshi. He is terrible at all subjects except for Health Education, in which few students, if any, could come close. Because of Kōta's extreme high score in Health Education, partly attributed to his wealth of knowledge of the human anatomy, especially that of females, his Shōkanjū carries an accessory, during battles in Health Education, that allows the Shōkanjū to perform an accelerated move. During Season 2 he is also shown to have achieved a score (774) higher than the Health Education teacher's. In the novel, he is also shown to be an expert in sneaking, gathering information, cunning, and many forms photography, whether it be hidden or not. In the anime, he has a habit of taking panty shots whenever the opportunity arises and to record all the girls' bust sizes in Fumizuki Academy. A running gag is, despite his perverse nature, if he even sees or hears something that might be perverted (such as his panty shots or Aiko's teasing) his nose will spontaneously bleed often ludicrous amounts, sometimes causing him to pass out. Despite being a pervert, he tends to avoid and feels uncomfortable around Aiko and her assertiveness; yet, he will still suffer from massive nosebleeds whenever she sexually teases him though. In the light novels, it's shown that he has two older brothers and a younger sister; regretfully after their appearance, they consume an imitation of Mizuki's cooking and were never seen again, suggesting that they died.
His Shōkanjū wears a ninja outfit and dual-wields Kodachi. During the ESB field error, his Shōkanjū wears a modified hakama and sports a short ponytail.
Ryō Sugawa (須川 亮, Sugawa Ryō)
Voiced by: Keisuke Goto (Japanese); Chris Burnett (English)
Ryō Sugawa is a minor supporting character in Class 2-F. He is the only Class 2-F student outside of the 'inner circle' whose Shōkanjū is described in the novel. He is also the leader of the FFF Inquisition, but ended up on the run during the third episode of the second season. Sugawa is also confident and full of himself; he prides himself for "protecting his first kiss" for sixteen years, and writes help guides on how to be "popular" and "reject girls" like him, despite being a loser unable to get dates himself.
His Shōkanjū wears a martial-arts robe and wields a staff.
FFF Inquisition
An organization in Class 2-F who once punished Akihisa for getting attention from the girls, to the extent of 'sentencing him to death'. Their clothing is based on those of the Ku Klux Klan, and their actions are based on the Spanish Inquisition. They also seem to be Hideyoshi's fans. When agitated, like when they learned of Class B's representative having a girlfriend, they would turn into "Messengers of Genocide", using their Shōkanjū as sacrifice, "suicide bombing" their opponents effectively.

=== Class A ===
Class A consists of 50 students, including 24 males and 26 females. It is regarded as the school's best equipped class. The top 10 in Class 2-A are considered exceptionally strong compared with other students in Class 2-A.

Shōko Kirishima (霧島 翔子, Kirishima Shōko)
Voiced by: Tomomi Isomura (Japanese); Jamie Marchi (English)
Shōko Kirishima is the childhood friend of Yūji Sakamoto. She is the top student in her level and the class representative for Class 2-A. In the story, she is portrayed as a soft-spoken, but highly assertive and intelligent girl. In the novel, her dialog always starts with ellipses. She is described as elegantly beautiful and very popular, like a typical Yamato Nadeshiko, but yet has no boyfriend, which initially created the impression to others that she is a lesbian. Later, it was revealed that the reason for this is because she is madly in love with Yūji since childhood and acts possessively towards him, to the point of frequently poking his eyes in order to prevent him from seeing other girls' underwear or swimsuits, applying locks and chains while they are together, using a handheld taser if he is being 'unfaithful' to her, and even attempted to submit a marriage certificate to the civil registrar (but fails in the anime, due to them being underage). She has stated to Yūji that she's a 'C-Cup' (bust size in Japan; which is a 'B-Cup' in the US). Despite being tricked multiple times, she still shows a trusting nature towards Yūji and practically believes everything he says, such as the date of the Taika Reform. Shōko is also shown to be someone who is a very long-term thinker, and has already decided on her children's names (Shoyū for a girl, and Koshō for a boy). She is also "hopeless when it comes to gadgets" (機械音痴) and is known to spoil any electronic gadget that falls into her hands, although in the novels she brings one that contains Yūji's supposed voice proposing to her and claims its 'normal music'. While she is a part of Class 2-A, Shōko often hangs around Akihisa's inner circle of Class 2-F, only because she wants to be around Yūji.
Her Shōkanjū is clad in Samurai armor and wields a Japanese longsword. During the ESB field error, her Shōkanjū also becomes an adult version of herself, wearing only an apron and lingerie underneath.
Aiko Kudō (工藤 愛子, Kudō Aiko)
Voiced by: Yoshino Nanjō (Japanese); Trina Nishimura (English)
Aiko Kudō is another elite student in Class 2-A. She is portrayed as a green-haired, friendly, easy-going, and mischievous girl. She uses 'Boku (僕)', commonly used by boys or young men, to address herself. She is extremely skilled in electronic gadgets and carries a micro-recorder for recording lessons, which she also uses to cause mischief to other people by recording, cutting and re-joining parts of their conversations, creating many misunderstandings and woes to others, especially towards Akihisa. She especially likes to mess around with Akihisa and Kōta often stating perverted things to arouse them and cause them to nosebleed. It is highly implied that she likes Kōta due to her messing with him at times.
Her Shōkanjū is clad in a schoolgirl sailor uniform and wields a battle axe.
Toshimitsu Kubo (久保 利光, Kubo Toshimitsu)
Voiced by: Takuma Terashima (Japanese); Joel McDonald (English)
Toshimitsu Kubo is a calm and cool man with glasses and the second-ranked student in his level. He lives in a relatively tight and structured schedule which is reflected in his high grades. However, he easily misinterprets situations and because of this, he thinks that Akihisa was trying to hit on him. As a result, he ends up having a homoerotic crush on him. When it comes to Akihisa, he can be just as crazy as Mizuki and Minami when Akihisa is implied to be involved with other women OR with other men.
His Shōkanjū uses dual scythes.
Yūko Kinoshita (木下 優子, Kinoshita Yūko)
Voiced by: Emiri Katō (Japanese); Brina Palencia (English)
Yuuko Kinoshita is the class ambassador of Class 2-A. She's also the attractive twin sister of Hideyoshi Kinoshita, older of the two by three minutes. Due to their disparity in academic abilities, she feels superior to her younger brother, whom she thinks is trash. Yuuko's is also very prideful, arrogant and easily agitated unlike Hideyoshi who is always calm. During the classroom wars in Volume 1, Hideyoshi, while acting on a strategy of Yūji, masqueraded as his sister and branded the whole of Class 2-C as filthy pigs, sowing discord between Class 2-C and Class 2-A, saving Class 2-F from a potential alliance between Class 2-C and Class 2-B. And the proud Yuuko bears a deep grudge against Hideyoshi and Class F for the incident. In episode three of season two, she forced Hideyoshi to switch roles with her for a day, where she begrudgingly learned that Akihisa finds her brother more feminine and attractive than her. In Episode 12 of the anime, it is revealed her weakness is yaoi manga. However, in the last episode, it is shown that she can be honorable as well, refusing to acknowledge their victory and that it was 'cowardly'. It may be hinted that she, along with Shōko and Aiko are already in Akihisa's inner circle of friends in the school.
Her Shōkanjū uses a jousting lance and wears heavy armor.

=== Class B ===
Kyōji Nemoto (根本 恭二, Nemoto Kyōji)
Voiced by: Hiromu Miyazaki (Japanese); Todd Haberkorn (English)
Kyōji Nemoto is the class representative for Class 2-B. He is devious, scheming, and does not hesitate to use underhanded tricks to win (including cheating). He's going out with Yūka Koyama, the class representative for Class 2-C, and which whom he attempted to set up an alliance with during the class war with Class 2-F in Volume 1. This was later foiled by Yūji's contingency plan, and after Kyōji was defeated in the Summoned Being Exam War, he was forced to wear a female school uniform. In the novel, photographs are taken of him, which was used as blackmailing leverage by Yūji. Yūka then discovers the photographs of him wearing the female school uniform and, of course, dumps him instantly. In the anime, photographs aren't taken, instead, Kyōji is forced to keep on wearing the female school uniform throughout the day and on the Mock Summoned Being Battle with Class 2-A, which later Yūka runs into Kyōji wearing it, and quickly dumps him due to believing it is some type of fetish of his.
His Shōkanjū wears priest robes and a beaded necklace and wields a scythe.
Ritsuko Iwashita (岩下 律子, Iwashita Ritsuko)
Voiced by: Mana Hirata (Japanese); Sarah Sullivan (English)
Ritsuko Iwashita is a female student in Class 2-B. In her debut appearance in Volume 1, she seems strong at Mathematics, but Mizuki defeats her through the use of a special bracelet she acquired thanks to her own high score. She also makes a brief appearance in Episode 1 of the Baka to Test to Shoukanjuu: Matsuri OVA, helping out her classmates with preparing for the school festival. During the Summoned Being Tournament, she and Mayumi fight as a team against Akihisa Yoshii and Yuuji Sakamoto in the first round. Despite their combined 100-point lead, they are defeated.
Her Shōkanjū differs the most amongst the series' media. In the manga adaptation, it wears a black ninja uniform and wields a katana. In the anime adaptation, it wears Western-style armor and wields a sword. In Episode 2 of the Baka to Test to Shoukanjuu: Matsuri OVA, it wears a normal girls' clothing with bunny ears, and wields a giant hammer.
Mayumi Kikuiri (菊入 真由美, Kikuiri Mayumi)
Voiced by: Ikumi Nakagami (Japanese); Brittney Karbowski (English)
Mayami Kikuiri is a female student in Class 2-B in Fumizuki Academy. She's good friends with her classmate Ritsuko Iwashita. During the Summoned Being Tournament, she and Ritsuko fight as a team against Akihisa Yoshii and Yuuji Sakamoto in the first round. Despite their combined 100-point lead, they are defeated.
Her Shōkanjū has a squirrel-like tail, wears armor, and wields a mace.
Miku Hatsune (初音ミク, Hatsune Miku)
Voiced by: Saki Fujita (Japanese)
Miku Hatsune made a cameo appearance in Episode 11 of the anime where she is seen helping defending Class B from Class F.

=== Class C ===
Yūka Koyama (小山 友香, Koyama Yūka)
Voiced by: Hiromi Igarashi (Japanese); Terri Doty (anime), Becca Shivers (OVA) (English)
Yūka Koyama is the class representative for Class 2-C, and going out with Kyōji Nemoto. However, in the novel, when she discovers the photographs of him wearing the female school uniform, which he was forced to wear and pose for photographs, she immediately dumps him. In the anime, he's forced to wear the female school uniform throughout the day and during the Mock Summoned Being Battle with Class 2-A, which Yūka runs into him on her way to also battle Class 2-A, and sees him wearing the female school uniform, and quickly dumps him, believing it is some type of fetish of his.
Her Shōkanjū wears a kimono and a skirt that wields a trident.
Tōru Kurosaki (黒崎 トオル, Kurosaki Tōru)
Voiced by: Kazuya Kaichi (Japanese); Ben Bryant (English)
His Shōkanjū wears the same turban, jacket, and pants as the generic Class 2-C Beings and wields a scimitar.
Sumire Niino (新野 すみれ, Shin'no Sumire)
Voiced by: Mana Hirata (Japanese)
Sumire Niino is a female student in Class 2-C and a school broadcaster in Fumizuki Academy, whose only voiced appearance in the series is in the Baka and Test Special Baka-Only Cross-Dressing Contest. In Episode 1 of the Baka to Test to Shoukanjuu: Matsuri OVA, she can be seen in Class 2-C sewing costumes alongside her classmates in preparation for the school festival.

=== Class D ===
Genji Hiraga (平賀 源二, Hiraga Genji)
Voiced by: Nobuhiko Okamoto (Japanese); Micah Solusod (English)
Genji Hiraga is the class representative for Class 2-D. A cool-headed individual with a decent strategical mind, he vows to not repeat Hiromi's mistake in underestimating the students of Class 2-F after they challenged his class to a Summoning Being Exam War. Unfortunately, in the end, he and his class still lose the match. Later in Episode 12 of Season 2, there's a spark formed between him and Yoshiko from Class 2-E.
His Shōkanjū wears a military general uniform and wields a sword.
Miharu Shimizu (清水 美春, Shimizu Miharu)
Voiced by: Ayana Taketatsu (Japanese); Kristi Kang (English)
Miharu Shimizu is the class ambassador for Class 2-D. She holds an extreme lesbian attraction to Minami Shimada, whom she addresses as onee-sama (お姉さま), and acts extremely possessive over her, especially if Minami is in the presence of boys, just like Shouko towards Yūji. On several occasions, she's been revealed to be a sociopath.
Her Shōkanjū is clad in a Roman legionary's armor and wields a spatha.
Miki Tamano (玉野 美紀, Tamano Miki)
Miki Tamano is just another class student in Class 2-D. In the novel of Volume 8, she addresses Akihisa by Aki-chan, but Akihisa doesn't like this. Miko is the first person to confess to Akihisa, who's the opposite gender of him, but unfortunately she's only attracted to him when he's dressed like a girl. She also thinks Akihisa likes Yuuji.
Her Shōkanjū wears a Kyudo uniform and wields a bow.

=== Class E ===
The second worst class in terms of grades next to Class 2-F. However, unlike Class 2-F, which is populated primarily by idiots, Class 2-E's students are mostly athletes, meaning that they can last longer in a summoning battle than most other students.

Hiromi Nakabayashi (中林 宏美, Nakabayashi Hiromi)
Voiced by: Yūko Takayama (Japanese); Anastasia Muñoz (English)
Hiromi Nakabayashi is the class representative for the Class 2-E. She has a crush on Kubo, which her avatar revealed in Episode 4 of Season 2. After she realizes Kubo holds feelings for Akihisa, she develops a grudge against him, even going far enough to deliberately hit him with a baseball pitch in the light novels.
Her Shōkanjū appears as a baseball player.
Yoshiko Mikami (三上 美子, Mikami Yoshiko)
Voiced by: Keiko Manaka (Japanese); Ryan Reynolds (English)
Yoshiko Mikami is the class ambassador of Class 2-E. She's the first character in the anime to be sent to remedial classes during the first Summoning Being Exam War of the new school year, challenged by Class 2-F.
Her Shōkanjū wears a white wizard robe and sports a small clover hairpin, while carrying a pink bag with a sling over its right shoulder, and wields a large spell book that can summon pink lasers and be used to smack other Summoned Beings.
Ayumi Furukawa (古川 あゆみ, Furukawa Ayumi)
Voiced by: -unavailable-
Ayumi Furukawa is another female student in Class 2-E.

== Third Year Students ==
Yūsaku Tsunemura (常村 勇作, Tsunemura Yūsaku)
Voiced by: Kōsuke Okano (Japanese); Corey Cleary-Stoner (English)
Yūsaku Tsunemura is a student of Class 3-A in Fumizuki Academy. He is good friends with his classmate Shunpei, and they were called the Tokonatsu duo. He has appeared in the OVA (Baka to Test to Shōkanjū: Matsuri) of the series, where he and Shunpei went to the Chinese cafe of Class 2-F and ate the sesame dumpling Himeji made. After complaining about the business, he was kicked by Yūji and spread some false rumors regarding the Class 2-F's business. In the tournament, they faced Akihisa and Yūji and he was teamed up with Shunpei. Although the Tokonatsu duo got the upper hand, they were defeated by the combined efforts of the Akihisa and Yūji. He later appears in the second season with Shunpei.
His Shōkanjū is clad in a red, heavy armor and wields a spiked ring.
Shunpei Natsukawa (夏川 俊平, Natsukawa Shunpei)
Voiced by: Yūki Ono (Japanese); Austin Tindle (English)
Shunpei Natsukawa is a student of Class 3-A in Fumizuki Academy. He is good friends with Yūsaku, forming the Tokonatsu duo. He has appeared in the OVA of the series along with Yuusaku, where he ate the sesame dumpling Himeji made and was hit twice with German Suplex. Although they spread some false rumors about Class 2-F's business, Akihisa and Yūji managed to set them up by framing Shunpei as a pervert for making "lewd" moves in public. In the tournament, he, alongside Yusaku, managed to face Akihisa and Yūji in the finals tournament (and still wearing the bra Akihisa had put him). He cheated by throwing an eraser on Akihisa's Shōkanjū as a distraction, giving him an advantage. Although the duo got the upper hand, they were defeated by the combined efforts of Akihisa and Yūji. He and Yusaku later appears in the second season.
His Shōkanjū wears a kimono under a coat with six feathers and wields a giant pipe.
Masaharu Takashiro (高城 雅春, Takashiro Masaharu)
Masaharu Takashiro is the class representative of Class 3-A, he is incredibly handsome and has multiple girlfriends, but is extremely gullible and will listen to anything anyone says. While this makes him appear to be stupid, he's actually very smart and can read Yuji's thoughts. He is even the one who planned the strategy that cornered Class 2-F during their Summoning Being Exam War against Class 2-C, which was completely out of Yuji expectations. He is also in love with Mizuki and tries to confess his love to her, even abusing his class rep status for love. As he tries to kiss Mizuki, Akihisa pushes her out of the way, which causing Masaharu and Akihisa to accidentally kiss.
Aoi Kogure (小暮 葵, Kogure Aoi)
Voiced by: Kotono Mitsuishi (Japanese); Martha Harms (English)
Aoi Kogure is a female student of Class 3-A in Fumizuki Academy, a tall girl with bluish hair and big breasts. She's also a member of the Tea Ceremony Club and the Rhythmic Gymnastics Club. It appears that she might have a crush on Masaharu Takashiro.
Kenichi Nanami (名波 健一, Nanami Kenichi)
Kenichi Nanami is a student in Class 3-A in Fumizuki Academy.
His Shōkanjū takes the form of Frankenstein's monster, which can be seen during the Test of Courage in Episode 12 of Season 2.
Ryōjirō Ichihara (市原 両次郎, Ichihara Ryōjirō)
Ryōjirō Ichihara is a student in Class 3-A in Fumizuki Academy.
His Shōkanjū takes the form of a mummy, which can be seen during the Test of Courage in Episode 12 of Season 2.

== Fumizuki's Teachers ==
Kaoru Tōdō (藤堂 カヲル, Tōdō Kaoru)
Voiced by: Kaori Nakamura (Japanese); Wendy Powell (English)
Kaoru Tōdō is the Principal of Fumizuki Academy. Her name is never spoken in the Japanese version of the anime.
Shin Fukuhara (福原 慎, Fukuhara Shin)
Voiced by: Kenjiro Tsuda (Japanese); Anthony Bowling (English)
Shin Fukuhara was the first homeroom teacher of Class 2-F, who in the anime became the narrator after the first classroom wars, and was replaced by Nishimura.
Sōichi Nishimura (西村 宗一, Nishimura Sōichi)
Voiced by: Akio Ohtsuka (Japanese); Kent Williams (English)
Sōichi Nishimura is Fumizuki Academy's Disciplinary Supervisor, who becomes homeroom teacher for Class 2-F after their loss to Class 2-A. Nicknamed Iron Man (鉄人) or Tetsujin because of his hobby of participating in triathlons, he is extremely strict and possesses prodigious physical abilities, like being able to jump with the best of them. He also supervises remedial classes, dragging students off for supplementary lessons regardless of their location whenever the points of their Summoned Beings reaches zero, declaring, "Those who are KIA must receive supplementary lessons!" He can permit the summoning for any subject.
Yōko Takahashi (高橋 洋子, Takahashi Yōko)
Voiced by: Yumi Kakazu (Japanese); Colleen Clinkenbeard (English)
Yōko Takahashi is the Head Teacher of Year 2 and the homeroom teacher of Class 2-A. She is bespectacled, probably the smartest person in Fumizuki Academy, but is really bad at baseball. Her total score on all subjects is 7800, nearly twice as much as Shōko.
Her Shōkanjū is clad in a black military officer's uniform that resembles a bit of a German officer of World War I and armed with a whip.
Hasegawa (長谷川, Hasegawa)
Voiced by: Daisuke Kageura (Japanese); Ian Sinclair (English)
Hasegawa is the Mathematics teacher.
Takeshi Ōshima (大島 武, Ōshima Takeshi)
Voiced by: Masayuki Tanaka (Japanese); Andrew Chandler (English)
Tekeshi Ōshima is the Physical Education teacher. He is jealous of Kōta for having a high score than him in his own subject.
Fumihiro Fuse (布施 文博, Fuse Fumihiro)
Voiced by: Eiichiro Tokumoto (Japanese); Eric Vale (English)
Fumihiro Fuse is the Chemistry teacher. He is shown to have a quiet and placid demeanor.
Takenaka (竹中, Takenaka)
Voiced by: Shinya Takahashi (Japanese); Sonny Strait (English)
Takenaka is the Classic Literature teacher.

== Students' Families ==
Hazuki Shimada (島田 葉月, Shimada Hazuki)
Voiced by: Mana Hirata (Japanese); Lindsay Seidel (English)
Hazuki Shimada is Minami's younger sister, and is in the fifth grade. She addresses Akihisa as Stupid Brother (バカなお兄ちゃん, Baka na Oniichan), but means it in a loving manner. She routinely expresses her love for Akihisa and desire to become his wife in the future.
Yukino Sakamoto (坂本 雪乃, Sakamoto Yukino)
Voiced by: Yoriko Nagata (Japanese); Lydia Mackay (English)
Yukino Sakamoto is Yūji's mother. Her looks do not match her actual age and is often mistaken as Yūji's older sister instead. She's also an airhead, as to make a Nikujaga without meat or potatoes (because she forgot to buy it), much to Yūji's dismay.
Akira Yoshii (吉井 玲, Yoshii Akira)
Voiced by: Kikuko Inoue (Japanese); Carli Mosier (English)
Akira Yoshii is Akihisa's busty, elder sister. She is 23 years old and a Harvard graduate. She seems to have little to no regard for social decency. She is poor at cooking. She seems to have a brother-complex, and often behaves in a manner which implies that she harbors romantic feelings for Akihisa, inducing great stress in him. Potential romantic feelings aside, she loves her brother dearly and her primary motivation is her concern about his lifestyle and maturation.
Yoshimitsu Kubo (久保 良光, Kubo Yoshimitsu)
Yoshimitsu Kubo is Toshimitsu's younger brother.
Mr. Shimizu
Voiced by: Takashi Matsuyama (drama CD)
Full name unknown. He is Miharu's father, who runs a popular coffee shop at the train station.
Mr. Himeji
Full name unknown. He is Mizuki's father, who's a 40+ year-old man and, as Akihisa calls him, a "lolicon" (this is due to his wife's height being "slightly bigger than Hazuki-chan"). Apparently he has a 'weak' heart and is often mistaken as an offender due to his wife's appearance. He appears at the end of Volume 9, alongside his wife.
Mizuho Himeji (姫路 瑞穂, Himeji Mizuho)
Mizuho Himeji is Mizuki's mother, who's 41 years old, but looks only slightly taller than Hazuki, and can be mistaken for Mizuki's younger sister. She recognizes Akihisa as "the one on [Mizuki's] cushion and bed sheet." She is apparently perfectly fine with talking about her husband's and daughter's underwear in public, and has weird taste (she bought her husband kitty boxers that "got lots of weird looks from his colleagues at his workplace"). She said to Akihisa that he should come over to their house someday, so she can show him Mizuki's embarrassing photos. She appears at the end of Volume 9, alongside her husband.
