= Kristi Kang =

American voice actress

- Born: Kristi Lynn Bingham; March 24, 1984 (age 42)
- Education: University of Texas at Arlington
- Occupation: Voice actress
- Years active: 2004-2019
- Spouse: Joseph Kang (m. 2011)

Kristi Lynn Kang (née Bingham, born March 24, 1984) is a former American voice actress. She has provided voices for a number of English-language versions of Japanese anime films and television series. She voiced Kyoka Kanejo in B Gata H Kei Yamada's First Time, Levy McGarden in Fairy Tail, Shoko Uemura in Rideback, and Miharu Shimizu in Baka and Test. Besides having been a voice actor, she is a yoga instructor in the Arlington and Mansfield, Texas area.

== Filmography ==
=== Anime ===
List of voice performances in anime
Year	Title	Role	Notes	Source
	A Certain Scientific Railgun series	Kinuho Wannai		
2019	Ace Attorney	Vega Mytonbred		
2017	Aria the Scarlet Ammo AA	Raika Hino		
2015	Assassination Classroom	Yuzuki Fuwa	also Koro-sensei Q!	
2012	B Gata H Kei: Yamada's First Time	Kyoka Kanejo		
	Baka and Test series	Miharu Shimizu		
	Bamboo Blade	Suzushiro	Eps. 12-13	
	Big Windup!	Suzune Miyashita, Keiko Izumi (Izumi's Mother)	Eps. 16, 21 (Keiko Izumi)	
2017	Black Clover	Lou	Ep. 9	
	Cat Planet Cuties	Maya		
2017	Chaos;Child	Uki Yamazoe		
2017	Chronos Ruler	Wendy	Ep. 6	
	Claymore	Katea, Veronica, Zelda	Ep. 15 (Katea), Ep. 23 (Zelda)	
	Darker than Black	Yuka	Eps. 3-4	
2016	Dimension W	Ichigo Yurizaki, Kiyomi Katō	Ep. 2 (Ichigo Yurizaki), Eps. 3-5 (Kiyomi Katō)	
	Divine Gate	Odin		
	Eureka Seven: AO	Maeve McCaffrey		
	Fafner in the Azure: Heaven and Earth	Tsubaki Minashiro		
2011-2019	Fairy Tail	Levy McGarden	Name change during series (Note: The English voice for Levy is credited as Kristi Bingham for Fairy Tail DVD Part 1, and as Kristi Kang for Fairy Tail DVD Part 2 (episode 19-).)	
	Freezing series	Cathy Lockharte		
2016	Garo: The Animation	Amalia		
	Good Luck Girl!	Non-Chan	Ep. 5	
	Haganai series	Maria Takayama		
2014-2018	High School DxD series	Irina Shido	New, BorN and Hero	
	Jormungand: Perfect Order	Elena "Babs" Baburin		
2018	Junji Ito Collection	Miyoko Watanabe	Ep. 11	
2014	Kamisama Kiss	Kei Ueshima	Eps. 6–8, 10, 13	
2017	KanColle: Kantai Collection	Atago		
2018	Katana Maidens ~ Toji No Miko	Rui Onda		
	Kaze no Stigma	Yui	Ep. 17	
	Level E	Satomi	Eps. 8-9	
2017	Luck & Logic	Pieri Saotome		
	Master of Martial Hearts	Rin Hiroishi		
	Nabari no Ou	Subaru Fushita		
2015	Ninja Slayer From Animation	Bunako	Ep. 3	
2012	Okami-san and Her Seven Companions	Gretel, Futaba Shirayuki	Eps. 9-10 (Futaba Shirayuki)	
	One Piece	Tamachibi	Funimation dub	
2017	One Piece Film: Gold	Lepre		
2014	Psycho-Pass	Kagami Kawarazaki	Eps. 6-8	
	Puzzle & Dragons X	Angelion		
2014	Red Data Girl	Mayura Soda		
2011	Rideback	Shoko Uemura		
2010	Rin: Daughters of Mnemosyne	Yuria Takimoto	Ep. 3	
	Robotics;Notes	Rosetta Yuki		
2011	Rosario + Vampire series	Tonko Oniyama		
2011	Sekirei	Yomi	Ep. 3	
	Sgt. Frog	Yayoi Shimotsuki		
	Shin-chan	Aria, Tammy	Ep. 53 (Aria), Ep. 65 (Tammy)	
2014	Space Dandy	Maker, Miranda	Ep. 13 (Maker), Ep. 22 (Miranda)	
2013	Tenchi Muyo! War on Geminar	Yukine Mare, Koro		
	The Legend of the Legendary Heroes	Fahile	Eps. 2-3	
	The Rolling Girls	Yumi, Kosuzu		
	The Tower of Druaga series	Kai, Oro	Eps. 11-12 (Kai, The Aegis of Uruk), Eps. 1–2, 5, 9-10 (Oro, The Sword of Uruk)	
2017	Tsuredure Children	Ayaka Kamine		
2015	Ultimate Otaku Teacher	Matome Nishikujo, Midori	Ep. 16 (Matome Nishikujo), Ep. 6 (Midori)	
2017	Valkyrie Drive: Mermaid	Futaba Kirii		
	We Without Wings	Yu Yoneda		
	Wolf Children	Keno		
