= B Gata H Kei =

Japanese manga series by Yoko Sanri

- First tankōbon volume cover, featuring Yamada

B型H系 (Bī Gata Etchi Kei)
- Genre: Coming-of-age; Romantic comedy; Sex comedy
- Manga
- Written by: Yōko Sanri
- Published by: Shueisha
- Imprint: Young Jump Comics
- Magazine: Weekly Young Jump
- Original run: April 15, 2004 – February 3, 2011
- Volumes: 9
- Anime television series
- Directed by: Yūsuke Yamamoto
- Produced by: Kentarō Kai; Shigehiro Kurita; Satoshi Matsui; Satoru Yoshida; Ryōsuke Mori
- Written by: Satoru Nishizono
- Music by: Hitoshi Fujima; Junpei Fujita
- Studio: Hal Film Maker (Note: Animation production assistance (アニメーション制作協力) for all episodes provided by Digital Network Animation.)
- Licensed by: NA: Crunchyroll
- Original network: KBS, Tokyo MX, tvk, TV Wakayama, AT-X, Chiba TV, Mie TV, Nara TV
- English network: NA: Funimation Channel
- Original run: April 2, 2010 – June 18, 2010
- Episodes: 12
- icon

B Gata H Kei (Japanese: B型H系, Hepburn: Bī Gata Etchi Kei; lit. "Type: B; Style: H") is a Japanese four-panel manga series by Yōko Sanri. It was published by Shueisha and ran in Weekly Young Jump from 2004 to 2011. The story focuses on the salacious wishes of a high school girl, whose perceived drawback of being a virgin leads to her lusting after and pursuing a rather average and unremarkable boy in her class.

A 12-episode anime television series was broadcast on KBS, Tokyo MX, and other networks from April to June 2010. Funimation (later Crunchyroll LLC), has licensed the anime series with the title Yamada's First Time: B Gata H Kei, and released the series on DVD and Blu-ray in January 2012. A drama CD has also been released.

== Plot ==
B Gata H Kei follows lascivious 15-year-old high school student Yamada, who makes it a goal to have sexual relations with 100 different guys, although her insecurities as a virgin herself lead her to reject every chance to do so. To overcome this mental barrier, she searches for a "cherry boy," an inexperienced guy who will be her first. She makes a rather plain classmate of hers, Takashi Kosuda, the target of her seductions for the sole purpose of achieving this goal; however, she ultimately falls for him.

== Characters ==
Yamada (山田)
Yamada is a high school girl who is best described as oversexed, flirtatious and lustful. She is particularly vain and is unabashed in flaunting her looks in public. Her goal in high school is to have sex with 100 guys; however, her insecurities as a virgin causes her to turn down any advances. She believes the first step towards realizing her dreams is to lose her virginity to an inexperienced boy; this leads her to pursue Takashi Kosuda after she accidentally falls on him at the bookstore.^{[ch. 1]} Through the course of the series, Yamada tries to make advances on Kosuda, and becomes overly jealous whenever other girls interact with him. She eventually acknowledges she has feelings for him. Despite living at home with her younger sister, Yamada is unashamed in her licentious habits. She is an excellent student,^{[ch. 11]} although that is partly attributed to her ability to read and memorize articles about sex.^{[ch. 253]} At the conclusion of the manga series, author Yoko Sanri noted that she never managed to reveal Yamada's given name.^{[ch. 300:author's notes]} Yamada is voiced by Yukari Tamura in Japanese, and by Brittney Karbowski in English.
Takashi Kosuda (小須田 崇, Kosuda Takashi)
Takashi Kosuda is Yamada's classmate and the target of her lust and affections. He is perceived by Yamada and their classmates as being nothing special, even "plain and ordinary".^{[ch. 3]} When Yamada makes advances on him, he is initially taken in, but becomes confused and anxious because of her mixed signals. His hobby is landscape photography.^{[ch. 8]} Over the course of the story, he develops feelings for Yamada while being totally oblivious that she only wants to be with him in order to lose her virginity. He is voiced by Atsushi Abe in Japanese, and by Scott Freeman in English.
Miharu Takeshita (竹下 美春, Takeshita Miharu)
Miharu Takeshita is Yamada's best friend and classmate. She is described as "dry and sarcastic", and a "foil for the loud, sex-obsessed Yamada". Despite Yamada's prurient interests, she tries her best to help, even going so far as to invite Takashi and Yamada on a double date at the water park.^{[ch. 15]} Yamada gives her the moniker "F-shita" as a reference to her cup size. Although she has a boyfriend who is a college student, she rarely talks about him because of Yamada's lewd prying,^{[ch. 15]} and hinting that she lost her virginity after junior high school graduation.^{[ch. 79]} Miharu is voiced by Yui Horie in Japanese, and by Cherami Leigh in English.
Mayu Miyano (宮野 まゆ, Miyano Mayu)
Mayu Miyano is the childhood friend of Kosuda, who lives directly across the street from her house. She is depicted as a shy, clumsy, yet busty girl with glasses.^{[ch. 20,22]} Mayu has feelings for Kosuda but doesn't have the courage to confess to him, instead she tends to revert to cooking.^{[ch. 37]} Because of her close history with Kosuda and her relatively large bust size, she is perceived by Yamada as a rival,^{[ch. 21,22]} although Kosuda considers her totally sexually innocent^{[ch. 37]} and a virgin.^{[ch. 73]} By the series' end she has come to terms with Kosuda dating Yamada and has chosen to study at a college in another town in order to become more independent, unaware that a secret admirer has chosen to follow her to university in order to remain near her. She is voiced by Kana Hanazawa in Japanese, and by Jad Saxton in English.
Kyoka Kanejo (金城 京香, Kanejō Kyōka)
Kyoka Kanejo is a returning transfer student from America who joins Yamada's class in their second year. She is extremely wealthy,^{[ch. 52]} and classifies herself as a perfectionist who can do everything, including modeling,^{[ch. 51]} cooking^{[ch. 74]} and sports.^{[ch. 46]} After she finishes as a runner-up to Yamada in the school's beauty pageant,^{[ch. 29,45]} she becomes obsessed with Yamada as a rival,^{[ch. 75,76]} and declares to her that she will still steal her boyfriend,^{[ch. 76,101]} However, she has an excessive complex over her brother Keiichi, and harbors a secret room full of pictures and objects that sport his image.^{[ch. 72-75]} Kyoka is voiced by Yū Kobayashi in Japanese, and by Kristi Kang in English.

=== Supporting characters ===
- The Eros Deities (エロ神様, erogami-sama) act as the character's libido. Yamada's Eros Deity takes on the appearance of a super deformed version of Yamada, but she has a white mustache, and floats on a pink cloud.^{[ch. 36]} She occasionally narrates and recaps past events as well as breaks the fourth wall to address the audience. She is voiced by Rumi Shishido and English dubbed by Alexis Tipton. Eros Deities are also depicted for the other characters: Kosuda's Eros Deity wears a bathrobe, has a laid back attitude, and gives ineffective advice such as telling Kosuda to give up and go to bed,^{[ch. 96]} but in the anime he more often stands in whenever Kosuda has an erection; Mayu's Eros Deity is dressed like a magical girl and gives innocent love advice such as suggesting that Mayu "indirectly kiss" Takashi with her cookies;^{[ch. 96]} Kyoka's Eros Deity is a noblewoman with a fan; Miharu has two deities to represent her serious and her wild side; Chika's Eros Deity appears like a motion blur which indicates they are in sync with each other.^{[vol. 3:extra chapter]}
- Chika Yamada (山田 千夏, Yamada Chika) is Yamada's little sister. She is unaffected by Yamada's perverted nature. She is very popular, and often receives affections and gifts from boys because of her cuteness,^{[ch. 9,43]} a trait she inherited from her mother.^{[ch. 60]} This experience allows her to clearly see what is going on in Yamada's love life. Although she is visited by many boyfriends, when Yamada asks her to teach her how to have sex without fail, Chika replies that she cannot give an answer as she does not know how.^{[ch. 176]} Chika is voiced by Asami Shimoda, and English dubbed by Emerick Jade.
- Kazuki Kosuda (小須田 香月, Kosuda Kazuki) is Takashi's older sister; she is a college student who lives with him at home.^{[ch. 13]} Though she often teases her brother, she deeply cares for him. She is not shy, and often walks around the house barely dressed despite her brother's presence, much to his objection.^{[ch. 16,26,130]} She recognizes Yamada has interest in Takeshi early on when Yamada visits,^{[ch. 13]} and helps them with advice throughout the series. Kazuki is voiced by Mamiko Noto, and English dubbed by Martha Harms.
- Keiichi Kanejo (金城 圭一, Kanejō Keiichi), is Kyoka's brother and a student at Harvard Business School.^{[ch. 116]} He is the object of every woman's infatuation that even a noblewoman could not withstand his charm.^{[ch. 114]} When he visits Japan, he takes an interest in Yamada because she does not instantly fawn over him.^{[ch. 132]} When Yamada asks about his virginity, he affirms he is one, although he is unaware that his sister has secretly eliminated his potential girlfriends.^{[ch. 139]} He later becomes a guest English teacher at Yamada's school,^{[ch. 258]} and pursues her relentlessly, until she affirms that she finally likes Kosuda.^{[ch. 280]} At the end of the series, Keiichi becomes a "legendary teacher" and the Minister of Science and Education.^{[ch. 289]} Keiichi is voiced by Tomoaki Maeno, and English dubbed by Eric Vale.
- Daisuke Matsuo (松尾 大祐, Matsuo Daisuke) is Miharu's boyfriend who attends a nearby college. He occasionally appears in the story as he offers advice to Kosuda concerning his relationship with Yamada, and appears to be composed and insightful, although it is because he has previously heard the details from Miharu.^{[ch. 17]} He is voiced by Yutaka Koizumi, and English dubbed by Ian Sinclair.
- Miss Akai (赤井先生, Akai-sensei) is Yamada's homeroom and P.E. teacher.^{[ch. 118]} She initially pairs Kosuda and Yamada as representatives for their school's sports festival^{[ch. 118]} after hearing that Kosuda announced that he likes Yamada during an informal beauty poll by the guys.^{[ch. 109]} In the anime, she pairs them up for library duty. She becomes concerned that Yamada and Kosuda might be fooling around after she finds them alone in the storeroom.^{[ch. 121]} In the manga, during Christmas, while out jogging, she finds a distressed Yamada^{[ch. 184]} and listens to her problems, but becomes shocked about her candid talk about sex.^{[ch. 186]} Her anxieties of being single^{[ch. 97]} and in her mid-20s^{[ch. 122]} are compounded when she overhears Kosuda proposition Yamada at the school stairs,^{[ch. 198]} and when Yamada writes that she wants to lose her virginity on her career counseling form.^{[ch. 230,231]} Akai is voiced by Yūko Gibu, and English dubbed by Cynthia Cranz.
- Mami Misato (三郷 まみ, Misato Mami) is Yamada's classmate with the petite figure and hair buns. She is as boy obsessed as Yamada. She's the first one to fall for Keiichi Kanejo when he returns to Japan, even snapping a picture of him at the airport,^{[ch. 115]} picking him as a "hot guy" at the sports day scavenger hunt,^{[ch. 131]} making moves on him during the Christmas party,^{[ch. 165]} and even goes as far as break into his estate sometime afterwards.^{[ch. 219]} Later on, she becomes interested in an effeminate looking guy named Kawai Mizuki,^{[ch. 245]} and even gets a brief makeover to look mature.^{[ch. 248-250]} Mami is voiced by Megumi Iwasaki, and English dubbed by Lara Woodhull.
- Aoi Katase (片瀬 葵, Katase Aoi) is Misato's friend and classmate; she watches over her in case she gets out of control. She has been looking after her since elementary school.^{[ch. 71]} She has a sour attitude towards boys^{[ch. 175,183]} after being in a relationship where her boyfriend cheated on her.^{[ch. 174,248]} Shunichi develops a liking for her.^{[ch. 193]} Aoi is voiced by Izumi Kitta, and English dubbed by Trina Nishimura.
- Yamada and Kosuda's other classmates had originally been referred to only by family name in the manga; they were given first names for the anime. The boys include: Kouta Akimoto has a light tuft of hair in front like Yamada, and has a crush on a rich girl at the Christmas party;^{[ch. 172]}; Shuinichi Kudou develops a liking for Katase; ^{[ch. 193]} Futoshi Kurokawa is the overweight guy.^{[ch. 189,191]} Besides Mami Misato and Aoi Katase, the girls that are involved in the story are: Kaori Sakai, who has light hair like Yamada and who hosts a party at her place with the guys and girls following the Kanejo Christmas Party;^{[ch. 190]} Maki Kobayashi, who during the Christmas party, is determined to find a rich boyfriend;^{[ch. 162]} and Ishibashi, who has short dark hair.^{[ch. 127,191]}

== Media ==
=== Manga ===
Written and illustrated by Yōko Sanri, B Gata H Kei debuted with one-shot chapters published in Shueisha's Young Jump Zōkan Mankaku and Weekly Young Jump in 2003 and 2004. It started a regular serialization in the latter magazine on April 15, 2004, and finished on February 3, 2011. Shueisha collected its chapters in nine tankōbon volumes, released from February 18, 2005, to March 18, 2011.

A drama CD was released on September 14, 2007. Outside Japan, the series is licensed in Traditional Chinese by Sharp Point Press.

==== Volumes ====
No.	Release date	ISBN
1	February 18, 2005	978-4-08-876756-7
2	January 19, 2006	978-4-08-877021-5
3	October 19, 2006	978-4-08-877154-0
4	June 19, 2007	978-4-08-877278-3
5	April 23, 2008	978-4-08-877411-4
6	April 22, 2009	978-4-08-877613-2
7	March 22, 2010	978-4-08-877742-9
8	July 16, 2010	978-4-08-877899-0
9	March 18, 2011	978-4-08-879114-2

=== Anime ===
An anime television series adaptation was announced in December 2009. It was broadcast for 12 episodes on KBS, Tokyo MX, and other networks from April 2 to June 18, 2010. The opening song is "Oshiete A to Z" (おしえて A to Z) and its ending theme is "Hadashi no Princess" (裸足のプリンセス). Both theme songs are performed by Yukari Tamura, and a maxi single containing the two themes was released on April 28, 2010. An internet radio show was produced by Hibiki Radio to go with the anime.

Funimation licensed the series with the title Yamada's First Time: B Gata H Kei, and released it on DVD and Blu-ray on January 31, 2012. Funimation also released a Blu-ray limited edition that has a mousepad of Yamada.

== Reception ==
Anime News Network reviewed the first episode of the series as a preview for the spring 2010 anime season. Carl Kimlinger initially assessed the series as having "real promise", and Theron Martin felt the comedy was on how Yamada focused on the sex side of a relationship rather than the emotional side, finding the first episode "fanboy-pandering", but somehow reticent about showing fanservice. Tim Maughan noted that although the premise could be interpreted as a "ballsy teen-sex comedy" about the pressures teens feel about becoming sexually active, but noted that due to the 1 am screening time, the audience was "otaku men-children" rather than teens. Zac Bertschy regarded it as "yet another in a long line of crappy anime sex comedies". It fared well in an ANN review of the Complete Series Collection, Rebecca Silverman commented that although it was a "bit tasteless" it is "also a surprisingly clean, very funny show about one girl's realization that sex and emotion aren't totally divorced from each other."

In July 2010, the anime team for the series posted a notice that they had received multiple threatening letters concerning the content and presentation of the anime. The team responded that the studio and its writers are not solely responsible for the content, the anime was handled by the production committee, and that they have reported the threats to the police.
