= Mana Hirata =

Japanese actress

- 平田 真菜
- Born: April 19, 1985 (age 41); Tokyo, Japan
- Occupations: Actress; voice actress
- Years active: 2009–present
- Agent: Production Baobab

Mana Hirata (平田 真菜, Hirata Mana; born April 19, 1985) is a Japanese actress and voice actress. She is affiliated with Production Baobab.

== Filmography ==
=== Anime ===
2017

- Two Car (Nene Itagaki)

2020

- Cap Kakumei Bottleman (Kōta Kōga)

2022

- Cap Kakumei Bottleman DX (Kōta Kōga)
- Raven of the Inner Palace (Ishiha)

2026

- Hell Teacher: Jigoku Sensei Nube (Mamoru Kazama)

=== OVA ===
- Baka and Test: Matsuri (Hazuki Shimada, Ritsuko Iwashita)
- Hime Gal Paradise (Masumi)
- Otome wa Boku ni Koishiteru (Yū Kashiwagi)
