= Lotte no Omocha! =

Japanese manga series by Yui Haga

- Astarotte no Omocha!
- Astarotte (left) and Naoya (right) on the cover of the first volume

ロッテのおもちゃ!
- Genre: Comedy, harem
- Manga
- Written by: Yui Haga
- Published by: ASCII Media Works
- Imprint: Dengeki Comics
- Magazine: Dengeki Maoh
- Original run: June 27, 2007 – December 27, 2013
- Volumes: 9
- Anime television series

Astarotte's Toy
- Directed by: Fumitoshi Oizaki
- Produced by: Gorō Shinjuku; Jun Fukuda; Naoki Iijima; Takashi Kikuya; Tatsuya Ishiguro
- Written by: Deko Akao; Akiyuki Shinbo (Note: Credited as 構成協力 (Composition Assistant).)
- Music by: Twinpower
- Studio: Diomedéa
- Original network: Chiba TV, tvk, Sun Television, TV Saitama, Tokyo MX, KBS Kyoto, TV Aichi, Nico Nico Channel, Bandai Channel, AT-X
- Original run: April 10, 2011 – June 26, 2011
- Episodes: 12 + OVA

Lotte no Omocha! (ロッテのおもちゃ!, Rotte no Omocha!; "Lotte's Toy!") is a Japanese manga series written and illustrated by Yui Haga. The narrative centers on Naoya, a man brought to a magical realm to become part of Princess Astrarotte's harem. Lotte no Omocha! was serialized in July 2007 issue of Dengeki Maoh, and later compiled into nine volumes republished by ASCII Media Works. In 2011, the manga series was adapted into an anime television series titled Astarotte no Omocha! (アスタロッテのおもちゃ!; "Astarotte's Toy!"), produced by Diomedéa under the direction of Fumitoshi Oizaki, the series aired from April 10 to June 26, 2011

== Plot ==
In the fantastical realm of Álfheimr, 10-year-old succubus princess Astaratte Ygvar, the heir to the kingdom of Ygvarland (ユグヴァルランド, Yuguvarurando). In succubus society, age ten marks a critical turning point: it is when a young succubus is expected to begin forming a male harem. Unlike vampires who rely on blood, succubi sustain their body and preserve their beautiful appearance by absorbing male essence. In early puberty, a simple light kiss is sufficient; however, as they mature into young adulthood, they come to require a substance known as "sáðfryma," better known as semen, to sustain themselves. The harems they form ensure a steady and readily available source of the liquid.

The princess is a paradoxical figure. Despite the societal expectation to develop a harem, she exhibits a strong disdain for men. Determined to subvert tradition, she decrees that her harem must include a human male, an almost impossible condition given that widespread belief that humans have long been extinct. Contrary to these legends, her loyal followers manage to locate Naoya Tohara, who is brought into the monster realm together with his daughter Asuha, This unexpected encounter sets off a chain of events that challenges both social norms and the nature of identity within a multicultural, magical setting.

== Characters ==
=== Main characters ===
Astarotte "Lotte" Ygvar (アスタロッテ・ユグヴァール, Asutarotte "Rotte" Yuguvāru)
Voiced by: Rie Kugimiya
The protagonist of the series. A young succubus who is only 10 years old when she learns of an ancient tradition: upon reaching full maturity, she will require a unique form of nourishment derived from male essence - much like a vampire requires blood - to sustain her life and magical powers. However, due to negative experiences with members of her mother's harem, Astarotte developed an intense hatred and aversion towards men. Her disdain is so profound that she decides to leave the main palace and live a separate residence, choosing to work exclusively with female companions - with the sole exception of the elderly Olav, whom she permits to remain with her.
In an effort to avoid the impending obligation altogether, Astarotte devises an ingenious plan: she declares that the first member of her harem must be a human male, reasoning that such a candidate would be impossible to find in Álfheimr where humans are believed to be extinct. Undeterred by the seemingly impossibility, her chief adviser travels through Yggdrasill, the legendary World Tree that connects all realms, and locates a suitable candidate in the human world. Much to Astrotte's initial chagrin, he is brought to Álfheimr along with his daughter.
Though at first dismissive of Naoya—the human man who fulfills this unlikely criterion—Astarotte gradually grows fond of him, even as she is frequently caught off guard by the unexpected situations their interactions generate. Complicating her journey is her physical development; as a late bloomer, she sometimes struggles with issues that arise from her being less physically mature compared to her fully developed mother. In the manga, there is even a suggestion that a recessive gene inherited from a distant female ancestor might prevent her from reaching the same level of physical maturity as her mother, Mercelída Ygvar, who still resides and rules from the main palace. Over time, Astarotte’s evolving relationship with Naoya leads her to a deep personal transformation. In the anime adaptation, she eventually comes to recognize that she has developed genuine love for him, while in the manga their bond culminates in marriage. A further twist in Astarotte’s story involves a sensitive family revelation. Initially unaware, she later learns that Naoya’s daughter—her close friend Asuha—is, in fact, her half-sister, known as Asuhariet. Although this discovery initially angers her due to the secrecy surrounding it, she ultimately finds it within herself to forgive those who withheld the truth. Additionally, the narrative touches upon her past, mentioning that her father succumbed to an illness.

Naoya Tohara (塔原 直哉, Tōhara Naoya)
Voiced by: Rina Satō
The hero of the series. When the Yggdrasill tree reactivates, one of Lotte's servants travels to the human realm, where Naoya is discovered and subsequently chosen as the first member of Lotte’s harem. His connection with Lotte's family stretches back many years. He first encountered Lotte’s mother when he was approximately 12 or 13, and about three years later, she returned accompanied by Asuha—Naoya’s daughter born from that early meeting—to live with him. Despite the expectations of harem dynamics, Naoya consistently resists these advances. He understands that Astarotte, given her tender age and the weight of her past experiences, requires genuine emotional support rather than being thrust into premature romantic entanglements.
After Ashua grows her wings Naoya is compelled to reveal a long-hidden truth to Astarotte: Ashua is, in fact, her half-sister. This revelation, though initially causing tension due to its secrecy, eventually leads to understanding and reconciliation. There is also a suggestion, voiced by Judit, that Naoya might possess part incubus heritage. This possibility is raised as an explanation for why the dormant Yggdrasill tree responded to him and reactivated its connection to the human world. Naoya’s early life was marked by isolation; his parents eloped, leaving him without close ties, and after their untimely death three years later, he descended into a deep depression. The discovery of his daughter during the funeral helped him begin to heal and find hope again. In the course of the anime, when circumstances force them apart, Naoya finally acknowledges his true feelings for Lotte. In contrast, the manga concludes with Naoya and Lotte marrying, cementing their bond and offering a resolution to their intertwined destinies.

Asuha Tohara (塔原 明日葉, Tōhara Asuha) / Asuhariet Ygvar (アスハリート・ユグヴァール, Asuharīto Yuguvāru)
Voiced by: Yukari Tamura
Asuha is 10 years old, like Lotte. She is the child that came of the encounter between Naoya and then Princess Mercelída, when the latter fled Álfheimr for a time. She is, in actuality, the rumored "dead princess" Asuhariet, and as it turns out, Astarotte's older half-sister (they are the same age because succubus pregnancies are 4 months shorter than human pregnancies). The reason Mercelida gave her up to Naoya after 3 years (knowing she might never see her daughter again) is implied to be an attempt to prevent her daughters from being caught up in a conflict for the throne, in fear that such a conflict would only bring pain for both of them. She is energetic and outgoing, and quickly befriends Lotte and the other girls at school. As part of her cambion heritage, she has an aversion to wearing underwear, which becomes a running theme with her, much to her father's exasperation. This also add the irony to the fact that though not a full-blooded succubus, she acts like it far more than her half-sister. Being older, she is the first of Queen Mercelída's daughters to grow her wings.

In the anime adaptation, Asuha is aware of her cambion heritage and, after a chance encounter with her mother, the Queen, her half-sister relationship to Astarotte. However, as instructed by her father and Judit, she keeps the matter secret. In the manga she is aware that her mother is the Queen and, after her wings finally grow, she and Naoya tell Astarotte the truth of her heritage. Shocked and angry that it was kept a secret from her while everyone else knew the truth, Lotte ordered the two to leave though Asuha declared that she still loves Lotte regardless if she was hated but Lotte would forgive them the next day.

=== People of Ygvarland ===
==== Lotte Castle ====
Judit Snorrevík (ユーディット・スノーレヴィク, Yūditto Snōrevikku)
Voiced by: Hitomi Nabatame
Lotte's head of staff and lady-in-waiting. Judit is duly concerned about Lotte's strong dislike for men because it might also affect the Princess's future health. Because of this, she is overjoyed when Lotte demands a human male for her harem. Even though Lotte was disingenuous, Judit perseveres and brings Naoya to the demon world via the World Tree. As head of Lotte's staff, Naoya usually comes to Judit for advice or general information in the demon realm. She is also constantly reminding Naoya of the reason he has been hired and to "let her (Astarotte) suck out the life seed". It is heavily implied that Judit has exotic tastes in matters relating to sex and that she even keeps a room full of S&M paraphernalia. She was assigned as Lotte's lady-in-waiting by Mercelida 10 years ago when Lotte was just a year old. At the time, she was pregnant with a baby but did not know who the father was as she has had relationships with several men. Despite being prepared to give birth to her child, her family made her abandon this desire thus causing her to transfer her parental love to Lotte. As the years pass, however, Judit would come to love Lotte as a person and not just as a daughter figure.

Olav Friðmar (オラフ・フリズマール, Orafu Furizumāru)
Voiced by: Chō
Lotte's aging butler, who was her former head of staff before being replaced by Judit. Olav was the only male staff in Lotte's castle before Naoya came to serve Lotte in her harem. Lotte allows him to work at the castle as a sinecure (partly because he is like a grandfather to her but mainly because he's old enough to be a grandfather but refuses to admit it). This is shown when he becomes injured while doing something such as hurting his back while gardening and requiring immediate bed rest. He is as concerned about Lotte's dislike for men as Judit is. Olav acts like a very proud grandfather towards Lotte and becomes very emotional whenever Lotte tries to act mature.

Griselda Reginhard (グリゼルダ・レギンハルト, Gurizeruda Reginharudo)
Voiced by: Ayumi Fujimura
Shortened to Zelda (ゼルダ, Zeruda), she is the current head of security at Lotte's manor. Like all the other staff serving Lotte, she is concerned about Lotte's dislike for men, although she prefers sympathizing with the princess rather than reprimanding her. She usually acts as Lotte's confidante or adviser whenever Lotte is troubled. Griselda's subordinates often wear very revealing outfits, to her extreme embarrassment. In the manga, Griselda seems to harbor a grudge against Naoya from their first encounter but is implied to have developed a small crush on him (therefore acting as a tsundere, similar to Lotte), although her abuse of Naoya takes the form of slandering or badmouthing him in letters to her master. She is very insecure with her flat chest. Griselda is usually seen watching over the princess, Asuha, and Naoya together with Effie or Judit.
In Chapter 21 of the manga, Zelda likens the relationship between Naoya and Astarotte as one akin to that of "a father and a spoiled daughter", which is a far cry from their official roles as servant and mistress.

Elfreda Mirjasdottír (エルフレダ・ミルヤスドッティル, Erufureda Miruyasudottiru)
Voiced by: Yui Horie
Nicknamed Effie (エフィ, Efi) for short, Elfreda is also part of Lotte's female-only staff. She's very notable for her very huge breasts, which made Naoya blush when he first met her. Effie is also one of Lotte's confidantes, the other one being Griselda. Effie hails from a noble bovine-like race and, as a female, she's able to produce as much milk as she desires even without having given birth. Her milk is of the highest quality and the only milk Lotte drinks. Effie is usually seen wearing a maid outfit, along with a bell around her neck (a nod to her bovine heritage) and is in charge of maintaining the castle's milk supply. Effie is generally nice, but can be slightly perverted at times, and was easily embarrassed around Naoya until she became used to his presence. Effie is usually seen together with Griselda or Judit, watching over the princess, Asuha, and Naoya. In Chapter 20 of the Manga, Effie stated that her older sister, Edda, was Mistrune's former wet-nurse.

Cuthfreda (クートフレダ, Kūtofureda)
Voiced by: Misaki Suzuki
Cuthfreda, shortened to Cú (クー, Kū), is a maid in Lotte's employ. She appears less frequently than the other servants, but she seems to be the only one in the castle who usually acts normally. She comes from the same country of night elves as Prince Sigurd. She came into Lotte's employ when a slave merchant tried to sell her to the princess, not realizing that the noble in the carriage was actually Lotte, who was very upset that her country's anti-slave law was being violated. Cu was a slave because the Alfur (High Elf) and Nott Alfur (Night Elf) races abhor the existence of half-breed children between the two even more than members of the other race (with a few notable exceptions – see below). Cu's skin color being intermediate between Alfur and Nott Alfur is evidence of her mixed parentage. After being rescued Cu decided to stay and work for Lotte because the princess and the castle staff valued her for herself and didn't care about her parentage.

Críet Trédís (クリエート・トレイディス, Kuriēto Toreidisu)
She is hired as one of the castle's maids in an attempt to help Prince Sigurd in sabotaging Lotte's relationship with Naoya. Like Cu, she is the daughter of an Alfur and a Nott Alfur, although this is evident as patchwork of lighter and darker skin in the form of a 'swimsuit tanline' rather than intermediate coloration like Cu's. It is later revealed that she is Nott Alfur King Sveinn's illegitimate daughter, whom Helga and Sigurd are not only aware of, but openly treat as their little sister. Part of the reason Criet wants a job is to be self-reliant rather than living solely on her allowance after her mother died one year prior. After her mixed parentage is revealed, she finds out that Judit and Lotte already knew about her parentage (including being Sveinn's daughter) when they hired her, but didn't have a problem with it. She decides to continue working at the castle as she feels it's "warm" (Naoya saying that her skin looked beautiful didn't hurt either). As such she no longer hides her mixed parentage and seems to have taken up teasing Naoya occasionally. How Helga and Sigurd's mother feels about her is unknown. However, Criet has painful memories of traveling with her mother while hiding her mixed parentage and that, while her siblings and father accepted her, her hometown didn't.

She is a character exclusive to the manga and does not appear in the anime.

==== Ivory Tower ====
Ingrid Sorveig Sorgríms (イングリッド・ソルヴェイク・ソルグリムス, Inguriddo Soruveiku Sorugurimusu)
Voiced by: Chiwa Saito
Nicknamed Ini (イニ) by Asuha, Ingrid is the most intelligent being in the Monster Realm even though she is only 7 years old. Her father, the world-renowned 300-year-old sage, died five years prior to the story. In the manga she explains that her father performed a memory transfer when she was younger, giving her all of his accumulated knowledge. As such, she knows almost everything since she is always reading books and discovering new things. However, she has lived a very secluded life, and her common sense and social skills tend to be lacking.
She is introduced when Naoya and Asuha travel to her tower in search of help to return Lotte to the Monster Realm. Her tower has a rabbit door hanger and a mail slot and in order to obtain access to her a supplicant has to supply an answer that solves a provided riddle. Asuha managed to "solve" the riddle by answering in such a non-standard way that it got Ini's attention.
She later appears to have developed a crush on Naoya, as shown when she kisses him in chapter 9. After she moves her tower closer to Lotte's castle, Ini introduces herself as his lover much to his confusion and Lotte's annoyance.

Sorveig Otto Sorgríms (ソルヴェイク・オットー・ソルグリムス, Soruveiku Ottō Sorugurimusu)
The former Great Sage of the Ivory Tower and Ingrid's father who died five years ago. He had collected almost all of the knowledge in the world, and he transferred this knowledge to his young daughter before his apparent death. He was known to be 300 years old, and was the one whom Naoya and Asuha initially searched for.

==== Rinhird Castle ====
Mercelída Ygvar I (メルチェリーダ・ユグヴァール, Merucherīda Yuguvāru)
Voiced by: Yuko Minaguchi
The mother of Lotte and Asuha who is a buxom woman. Mercelída is extremely promiscuous, even for a succubus; she started consuming male essence at age 10, and her harem contains over 3000 men of various races that also acts as her own private army. She has bisexual tendencies as well, such as when she and Ursula intimately flirt and nearly kiss at the beach. She once slept with a man from her harem while Lotte (who was 5 at the time) was in bed with her, having forgotten that Lotte was asleep nearby. This is slightly changed in the anime, so that instead of the man coming uncalled when Lotte was already in bed with her mother, he came when Astarotte was heading to her mother's room, so that her mother did not know she was there. Either way, the shock of this experience was the origin of Astarotte's hatred toward men. Because of her constantly busy schedule, she has little to no time to spend with Astarotte causing her to label herself as a bad mother. Despite this, she learns that she is very much loved by her daughters and thus she tries her best to make time for them especially now that Asuha has returned.

It is shown in flashbacks that Mercelída did not wish to become Queen, but was forced to ascend to the throne when her two elder sisters poisoned one another. At age 18, she traveled to the human world to avoid her responsibilities but discovered that the human realm (and humanity as a whole) is fairly mana-poor, leaving her without a source of life energy and no way to return home. Fortunately she met a 12-year-old Naoya, who even then possessed an overwhelming amount of magical power, which she was able to consume while using magic to make him sleep through the entire event. Unfortunately, in her haste she did not set up a contraception spell, and she became pregnant with Asuhariet. 3 years later she brought Asuha to live with Naoya on Earth in order to avoid her two daughters from engaging in a similar conflict. When she learns that Naoya is living in the Monster Realm, it is revealed that she still has feelings for him and affectionately calls him "Darling". She would also attempt to seduce him whenever they meet but is often rebuffed.

Úrsúla Sumarliði (ウルスラ・シュマルリージ, Urusura Shumarurīji)
Voiced by: Yuko Kaida
Mercelida's friend and bodyguard. In the manga and anime, it is implied that she has feelings for the Queen. In the manga, during the beach chapter, she is seen naked by Sigvaldi and revealed to be a hermaphrodite. This revelation never happens in the anime, which has a slightly different history, and thus may not be canon in the anime. In the anime, however, it is implied that she already managed to subtly reveal her feelings to Mercelida (who eagerly reciprocates them) when the latter confides to the former about how the Queen's personal romantic life is stuck in a rut despite the existence of the harem, as the two share an almost-kiss before they are suddenly interrupted. Ursula is from the Varhund (were-dog) race.

Isold (イソルド, Isorudo)
Voiced by: Nao Tōyama

Kilik Sigvaldi (キリク・シグヴァルディ, Kiriku Shiguvarudi)
A manga-only character, Kilik is a Colonel in the military. However he is weak, cowardly and woefully incompetent (something which he completely acknowledges). He got to his current rank by sleeping with his female superior officers and the wives of the male ones. But this practice has gotten him as far as he can go and he attempted to step up higher by seducing Lotte, which failed miserably due to her hatred of men. He could easily live a life of luxury if he joined the queen's harem, but he desires authority much more than wealth (due to being born a peasant rather than a noble). Despite his raunchy lifestyle he has been characterized as having a small penis, at least in comparison to Naoya and Ursula.

Eldor Emilson (エルドール・エミルソン, Erudōru Emiruson)
Eldor is Kilik's first lieutenant. Despite being actually competent in his job and embarrassed by his superior's nature, he seems to have no problem with aiding Kilik in his schemes or serving out punishments with him when they fail (though he does try to be a voice of reason to Kilik). Ursula is Eldor's older cousin and he refers to her as "sis," implying a relatively close relationship.

==== Royal Academy ====
Eríka Drakul Draupnils (エリカ・ドラクール・ドレイプニルス, Erika Dorakūru Doreipunirusu)
Voiced by: Yuko Goto
Erika is the daughter of a baron and hails from the high noble race of vampires. She is one of Lotte's and Asuha's friends, although Eríka and Lotte are more akin to rivals, where as she and Asuha often look after Lotte or scheme together. During the Ygvarland festivities, she joins Lotte and Asuha's friends in cheering on Lotte and Asuha's performance. Although Eríka is very proud of her vampire lineage, she also truly cares for her friends, even though she vehemently denies this. In this she is similar to Lotte in that both of them have tsundere tendencies, although, since Eríka is older, they are not as pronounced. As a maturing vampire, Eríka will soon need to start consuming blood on a regular basis in order to sustain herself, although the manga claims that she can still resort to drinking tomato juice for a while longer.
For unknown reasons, Eríka gets extremely jealous and frustrated when she hears that Astarotte and Naoya going out on a date or furthering their relationship.

Místrúne Ásgrím (ミストルーン・アウスグリム, Misutorūn Ausugurimu)
Voiced by: Miyu Matsuki
Místrúne, nicknamed Mist (ミスト, Misuto) for short, is one of Lotte and Asuha's friends. She is the daughter of a viscount and notable for having the biggest bust among Lotte's group of friends, including Eríka. Místrúne and her friends were initially reluctant to approach Lotte due to her royal status, but, through Asuha's intervention, became friends with Lotte at last. At fourteen years-old, Mist is the oldest of her group of friends, and her maturing figure earns her the jealousy of the other girls. The other girls are under the misapprehension that Mist's large bust is due to her having been nursed by Edda, Effie's older sister. Místrúne is also the most perverted one among the girls, although she usually manages to keep this side of hers hidden. She once had a crush on Naoya after he visited the girls' school.

Unnbjörg Signar (ユンビョルク・シグナル, Yunbyoruku Shigunaru)
Voiced by: Ryo Hirohashi
Unnbjörg, nicknamed Yuna (ユナ) for short, is one of Lotte and Asuha's friends. She has short green hair and a tall, slim figure. Unnbjörg is generally the most level-headed one of Lotte's friends, although she tends to go berserk whenever someone comments on her flat chest. She was the first to incorrectly believe that drinking directly from a dairy fairy's chest after a bath will make one's chest grow bigger. It has been hinted that Yuna is of the race of noble elves.
Yuna is also the subject of an artistic inconsistency between the manga and the anime; she sports navy blue hair in the former, while her anime counterpart is depicted with green hair.

Lucca Austri (リュッカ・エイストリ, Ryukka Eisutori)
Voiced by: Yui Hatano
Lucca is one of Lotte and Asuha's friends. She is a young princess from Northern Dvergur Kingdom (Northern Dwarf Kingdom). Her notable features include a small figure (even smaller than Asuha and Lotte) and brown hair with matching thick eyebrows. It is possible that Lucca comes from a wild tribe since she has admitted that she never wore panties before she came to Ygvarland. She also tends to always believe most of Asuha's white lies (For example, Asuha said that when wearing yukatas, one should not wear panties and when Eríka passes by, Lucca flips up Eríka's skirt, to Naoya's chagrin and Asuha's feigned ignorance). Unnborg has mentioned that Lucca stays over at her mansion. Lucca hails from a noble race of Dvergur (which explains her small figure and unconventional dining mannerisms), and that Yuna's mother enjoys dressing her up in frilly outfits as a "pastime".

Enja Níuhali (エンヤ・ニウハーレ, En'ya Niuhāre)
Voiced by: Naomi Shindō
Enja is the school's principal who looks as young as when Mercelida was her student. This is due to her being a Vartófa (were-fox) as heir species adolescence lasts 30 years.

Mina (ミーナ, Mīna)
Voiced by: Tetsuharu Ōta

=== People of Svarthæð ===
The people of Svarthæð are Nótt Álfur (night-elves) who originally also came from another world, Svartálfheimr, which was linked in the past with Álfheimr.

Sveinn Svarthæð (スヴェイン・スヴァルトヘイズ, Suvein Suvarutoheizu)
Sveinn Svarthæð is the king of the country of Svarthæð and father of Rúrik, Helga, Sigurð and Criet.

Rúrik Sveinnsson Svarthæð (ルーリック・スヴェインソン・スヴァルトヘイズ, Rūrikku Suveinson Suvarutoheizu)
Rúrik is the first prince of Svarthæð and seems to have been kept on a short leash due to his hobbies which seem to be even more offensive than Sigurð's attitude and partying. His relationship with Criet is unknown but during a party, he is shown to be sexually molesting his sister Helga before Naoya 'accidentally' fires a champagne cork in his direction interrupting his fun. In the manga his personality comes across as a pervert with a sadistic streak.

Þorhelga Svarthæð (ソルヘルガ・スヴァルトヘイズ, Soruheruga Suvarudoheizu)
Voiced by: Ryōko Shiraishi
Þorhelga, nicknamed Helga for short, is the princess of Svarthæð and is Sigurð's worrisome older sister. Like Sigurð she knows how to fight and defend herself, but unlike him takes herself and her responsibilities more seriously. She spends much of her time keeping him from causing too much trouble. She developed a huge crush on Naoya after he saved her from Rúrik's molestation at a party without making a big scene or creating an incident. Her feelings were further inflamed when she saw how strongly he held to his ideals even when tested, so much so that Criet was shocked upon seeing her behaving like a love sick teenager before composing herself. Helga becomes very depressed when she finds out that he has a daughter.

Sigurð Sveinnsson Svarthæð (シグルド・スヴェインソン・スヴァルトヘイズ, Shigurudo Suveinson Suvarutoheizu)
Voiced by: Hiroyuki Yoshino
Sigurð is the second prince of Svarthæð. Prior to his transfer to Lotte's academy, Sigurð spent his time and money on drinking and girls. He first meets Lotte at a street corner, falling in love with her at first sight, but Asuha immediately disapproves of him. He is often regarded as a wolf due to his mannerisms. The school put up warning signs of "Pervert" with his face on them at the girls' side, courtesy of Dóra, one of Sigurð's worrisome bodyguards. When Sigurð does sneak over to the girls' side, he meets Asuha again, who calls him a pervert. When Sigurð discovers Naoya is part of Lotte's harem, he immediately declares himself to be Naoya's rival for Lotte's hand. Aside from his perverted tendencies, Sigurð is a famous and well-respected general in battle. Ironically, although he was trained in a strict military academy, Sigurð continues to act by his own rules and uses the skills he learned at the military mostly for stalking Lotte's group or escaping Dóra's oversight. Despite all this, he is a surprisingly good cook as he was constantly told that quickly replenishing one's body is important to victory. In the manga Helga puts a special ring on him that Dóra can activate if she feels he is getting too wild and needs to be reigned in.

Ísadóra Finnsdottír (イサドーラ・フィンスドッティル, Isadōra Finsudottiru)
Voiced by: Kana Asumi
Ísadóra, nicknamed Dóra for short, is a chamberlain working under Sigurð. She is distantly related to Sigurð and Helga and is under orders from Helga to monitor and restrain Sigurð as needed based on her own judgement. If she feels it necessary she can chant an incantation that activates a ring Sigurð is wearing to forcibly restrain him. She is about Lotte's height but, based on her level of maturity in reigning in Sigurð's antics, is likely a few years older. She always wears an eyepatch, as it's a present from Sigurð which she treasures.

== Media ==
=== Manga ===
The original manga by Yui Haga was serialized in Dengeki Maoh magazine from July 2007 to December 2013.

No.	Release date	ISBN
1	February 1, 2008	978-4840242219
2	November 27, 2008	978-4048674379
3	August 27, 2009	978-4048680318
4	February 26, 2010	978-4048684293
5	November 27, 2010	978-4048689823
6	May 27, 2011	978-4048704922
7	June 27, 2012	978-4048866668
8	February 27, 2013	978-4048913614
9	January 27, 2014	978-4048662505

=== Video games ===
Lotte appears in Disgaea 4: A Promise Unforgotten as the cameo character for the spell, Omega Ice.

=== Anime ===
An anime adaptation under the title Astarotte no Omocha! (アスタロッテのおもちゃ！) began airing on Chiba TV and tvk on April 10, 2011, with subsequent broadcasts on Sun Television, TV Saitama, Tokyo MX, KBS Kyoto, TV Aichi, Nico Nico Channel, Bandai Channel, and AT-X. Produced by Diomedéa, the series is directed by Fumitoshi Oizaki, series composition by Deko Akao, music by Twinpower, character design by Mai Otsuka, and produced by Gorō Shinjuku, Jun Fukuda, Naoki Iijima, Takashi Kikuya and Tatsuya Ishiguro, respectively. An OVA episode was released on August 26, 2011. The opening theme is "Tenshi no CLOVER" (天使のCLOVER) by Aimi, and the ending theme is "Manatsu no Photograph" (真夏のフォトグラフ) by Azusa.

The anime adaption altered the sequence of some of the events as compared to the manga, for example, among others, moving the theme park visit later and introducing Lotte's classmates far earlier in the storyline, as well as adding a subplot about Lotte gaining a magical tattoo on her back revealing she is about to undergo puberty. This subplot was later retconned into the manga.

==== Episode list ====
No.	Title	Original release date
1	"The Exclamation of Our Meeting"; Transliteration: "Deai no Ekusukuramēshon" (Japanese: 出会いのエクスクラメーション)	April 10, 2011
Succubi are a race of beings who survive by having a harem of men from which they can suck 'life essence' from. However, Astarotte Ygvar, the crown princess, hates men. Under relentless pressure from Judit, her chief of staff, to grow up and start building her harem, she agrees to start but only with a human male. In the Creature World, humans are considered mythical creatures, with none having been seen in a thousand years. To her dismay, Judit manages to travel to the human realm and return with a 23-year-old human male named Naoya Tōhara, who accepts the offer to found Astarotte's harem.
2	"The First Semicolon"; Transliteration: "Hajimete no Semikoron" (Japanese: 初めてのセミコロン)	April 17, 2011
Naoya is introduced to Astarotte, but she refuses to get along with him. Naoya learns that when Astarotte was young, she witnessed her mother, Mercelída Ygvar I, engage in intimate acts with a member of her harem. From this, she developed a dislike for men and grew distant from her mother. Wanting to be able to make her feel less alone, Naoya makes a replica of Astarotte's favourite doll. The next day, Astarotte agrees to accept Naoya into her harem, on the condition that he be her "toy".
3	"Parentheses of Passing"; Transliteration: "Sure Chigai no Pāren" (Japanese: すれ違いのパーレン)	April 24, 2011
Naoya brings his ten-year-old daughter, Asuha, to the Creature World. Upon learning their ages, Astarotte grows upset since it would mean he had an affair when he was thirteen, though Asuha is quick to jump to Naoya's defense. Wanting to apologise to her, Asuha enrolls into Astarotte's school, where she makes some new friends, Mist, Yuna and Lucca, who mention they haven't had the courage to be friends with Astarotte. As Asuha makes up with Astarotte, rumours spread about a 'human male' on campus, which turns out to be a rampaging llama from a zoo. As it goes wild, Mist, Yuna and Lucca step in to defend Astarotte before Naoya manages to calm it down. Afterwards, Astarotte manages to make friends with the other girls, who affectionately call her 'Lotte'.
4	"Ampersand of the Party"; Transliteration: "Pātī no Anpasando" (Japanese: パーティーのアンパサンド)	May 1, 2011
The school's students receive invitations for their parents to attend a parent-teacher party. Astarotte states her mother, Mercelida, would be too busy to attend, but Asuha insists that she go ask her in person to be sure. She and Zelda visit Mercelída's palace, but after hearing the muttered complaints of palace staff, Astarotte returns home, leaving the invitation behind. At the party, Astarotte teases her rival, Elika, about Astarotte's alleged relationship with Naoya, but later becomes saddened when Mercelída doesn't show to the party. Her mother, who had come late to the party was returning to her own palace after missing her daughter, decides suddenly to see Astarotte anyway and flies to Astarotte's palace, only to encounter Naoya and Asuha, who is revealed to be her daughter, also known as Asuhariet.
5	"Quotation of Crossing"; Transliteration: "Kōsa no Kuōtēshon" (Japanese: 交差のクォーテーション)	May 8, 2011
Naoya feels conflicted by the appearance of Mercelida, who three years after their chance fling left Asuha with him and disappeared, with Mercelida immediately running off before listening to what Naoya has to say. Judit reveals to Naoya that Mercelida is the queen, making Asuha and Astarotte half-sisters, and asks him to keep it a secret from Astarotte. Wanting to speak with Mercelida, Naoya and Asuha sneak into the palace dressed as maids. They are discovered by one of the queen's servants but is coincidentally chosen to be an escort based on Mercelida's requests. Upon meeting her, Naoya gives his thanks to Mercelida for bringing Asuha into his life. As Naoya talks with Mercelida, it is revealed she hid Asuha in the human realm to avoid the same battle against sisters for the throne that she faced. Noticing Astarotte is still downhearted, Naoya asks Mercelida to visit her class for the day, making it a day where everyone's parents could visit. Afterwards, Astarotte and Mercelida manage to reconcile with each other.
6	"Caret of Being Lost"; Transliteration: "Tomadoi no Karetto" (Japanese: 戸惑いのカレット)	May 15, 2011
As Astarotte receives tickets to an amusement park, she becomes irritated with everyone making use of Naoya. Later that night, Astarotte goes missing before Naoya finds her by the World Tree. As Astarotte yells at Naoya, she accidentally activates the gate and is sent to the human world. Trying to think of a way to get her back, Naoya and Asuha go to seek out a sage named Sorveig that could help them. In order to see her, they have to solve a riddle, which Asuha manages to answer with her undies. There, they meet the sage, Ingrid Sorveig Sorgrims, who reveals the gate is linked to the Succubus race. As Ingrid agrees to help them, she soon learns that, due to the lack of magic in the Human World, Astarotte doesn't have enough magic to activate the gate.
7	"Secret Apostrophe"; Transliteration: "Naisho no Aposutorofi" (Japanese: 内緒のアポストロフィ)	May 22, 2011
Naoya travels to the human world in order to replenish Astarotte's magic so that she can return. However, Astarotte is still mad at him and tries to lock him out of his house, though this ultimately fails. After making up with her, Naoya kisses Astarotte on her forehead, allowing her to regain her magic and return to the demon world. As Naoya takes Astarotte to an amusement park as way of apology, Elika decides to take Asuha with her to the same park. To test her alleged 'adulthood', Elika suggests Astarotte go inside a haunted house, where she becomes so scared that she wets herself. As she becomes upset about it, Naoya reveals he didn't stop wetting the bed until he was 12. Upon returning home, they find Ingrid has moved her tower closer to the castle and become shocked when Ingrid suddenly kisses Naoya on the lips.
8	"Forceful Comma"; Transliteration: "Tsuyoki no Kanma" (Japanese: 強気のカンマ)	May 29, 2011
A prince from the Svarthæð empire, Sigurð Sveinnsson Svarthæð, bumps into Astarotte in town and falls in love at first sight. He sneaks into school and confesses his desire to marry Astarotte in front of her and her friends. Afterwards, Astarotte gets annoyed with Naoya for not saying anything when that happened. Later one night, Sigurð sneaks Astarotte out of the castle, hoping to receive an answer to his question, but Naoya appears and manages to convince Astarotte to come back with him after evading Sigurð's attack.
9	"Slight Fever Backslash"; Transliteration: "Binetsu no Bakkusurasshu" (Japanese: 微熱のバックスラッシュ)	June 5, 2011
Astarotte and the others go to a private beach for some fun. Mercelida is also visiting another part of the beach and ends up meeting with Astarotte, hearing about how she's becoming friends with Asuha. After they part ways, Naoya catches a fever and seems to be uncomfortable around a 'certain area'. As Astalotte and her friends work on some get well food with help from Sigurð, Judit pressures Naoya to make more progress with the sexual nature of his relationship with Astarotte.
10	"Adjacent Fist"; Transliteration: "Tonari Dōshi no Fisuto" (Japanese: 隣同士のフィスト)	June 12, 2011
A festival celebrating the World Tree is taking place and Astarotte's friends help her prepare for a singing performance. After some training and a bath, the girls, along with Naoya, head to the festival, where they have a brief run in with Sigurð. With Astarotte still nervous when it's time for her performance, Asuha helps her out by joining in the singing. After the festival, Asuha brings up the question of what Naoya intends to do after summer vacation ends.
11	"A Full Stop for the Two of Us"; Transliteration: "Futarikkiri no Furu Sutoppu" (Japanese: 二人っきりのフルストップ)	June 19, 2011
Astarotte gets a red clover-shaped mark on her back, allegedly a sign that she is becoming an adult, and Judit tries to push Naoya into fulfilling his job description. As Judit later finds out it is not the same mark, but instead related to the leaves on the World Tree turning red, Naoya and Asuha start feeling weird. Ini theorises that the magical balance between worlds is destabilising and the World Tree is attempting to eliminate foreign objects from the Demon World, namely Naoya and Asuha. Soon, Naoya and Asuha become unable to hear the others and vice versa, and they also discover the entries in Asuha's diary are disappearing. With Astarotte potentially at risk from the World Tree as well, Naoya and Asuha decide they need to return to the Human World. The castle holds a farewell party, where Astarotte exchanges gifts with Asuha before asking Naoya on a date.
12	"An Asterisk Beyond the Sky"; Transliteration: "Sora-goshi no Asutarisuku" (Japanese: 空越しのアスタリスク)	June 26, 2011
Astarotte and Naoya have their date at the amusement park where she finally manages to convey her feelings to him. The two promise to meet again while Mercelida pays a visit to Asuha. Some time after Naoya and Asuha return to the human realm, Ini makes use of Naoya's cellphone and the World Tree sapling at their house to establish communications with them, and the duo learns that the clover-shaped mark on Lotte's back was actually a bug bite and Judit gets some "punishment" for her mistake. Soon after Ini manages to stabilize the World Tree's magic to create a proper portal between the worlds, Naoya and Asuha use it to return to the monster realm and rejoin Lotte, whose growth marks finally appeared on her back.
OVA	August 26, 2011	
Tasked with homework based on self-research, Asuha decides to do her research on underwear whilst Astarotte decides to research on a dragon egg found in the World Tree. When the nest falls and breaks, Asuha makes a substitute nest out of everyone's underwear, allowing the egg to hatch. Later, Judit tells of four years ago when Astarotte first met Zelda, who had been training under her master, Attley Reginhard. When a stray alpaca tries to attack Astarotte, Zelda awakens her senses as a guardian, deciding to become Astarotte's bodyguard. Eleven years ago, Mercelida, who wasn't ready to become queen, escaped from the castle and ended up in the human world, where she met Naoya. As Mercelida lamented how her coming into royalty meant the death of her sisters, Naoya gives her comfort. That night, Mercelida decided to have sex with Naoya to restore her magical energy before returning home. And as a result becomes pregnant with Asuha, though it's not shown in the OVA.
