= Yui Haga =

Japanese manga artist and illustrator

Haga Yui
- 葉賀
- Known for: Anime, Manga, Light novels
- Notable work: Astarotte no Omocha!, Baka to Test to Shoukanjuu
- Website: hagayui.sakura.ne.jp

Yui Haga (葉賀ユイ, Haga Yui) is a Japanese light novel, manga, and anime artist. His most famous work is Baka and Test, which inspired a two series anime and a video game for the PlayStation Portable. He is also responsible for Astarotte no Omocha! and Sakura*Nadeshiko. Additionally, he was responsible for the ending illustrations in Nisemonogatari.
