= Baka and Test =

Japanese light novel series

- Cover of Baka and Test light novel volume one as published by Enterbrain featuring Akihisa Yoshii, Hideyoshi Kinoshita (left), Mizuki Himeji (center), Minami Shimada and Kouta Tsuchiya (right)

バカとテストと召喚獣 (Baka to Tesuto to Shōkanjū)
- Genre: Fantasy comedy
- Light novel
- Written by: Kenji Inoue
- Illustrated by: Yui Haga
- Published by: Enterbrain
- Imprint: Famitsu Bunko
- Original run: January 29, 2007 – March 30, 2015
- Volumes: 18
- Manga
- Written by: Kenji Inoue
- Illustrated by: Mosuke Mattaku; Yumeuta
- Published by: Kadokawa Shoten
- English publisher: NA: Yen Press
- Magazine: Shōnen Ace
- Original run: April 25, 2009 – July 26, 2016
- Volumes: 15
- Manga

Baka to Test to Shōkanjū Spinout! Sore ga Bokura no Nichijō
- Written by: Kenji Inoue
- Illustrated by: Namo
- Published by: Enterbrain
- Magazine: Famitsu Comic Clear
- Original run: October 30, 2009 – June 22, 2012
- Volumes: 6
- Manga

Baka to Test to Shōkanjū Ja
- Written by: Koizumi
- Illustrated by: Koizumi
- Published by: Kadokawa Shoten
- English publisher: JManga
- Magazine: Shōnen Ace
- Original run: August 26, 2010 – January 25, 2014
- Volumes: 4
- Anime television series
- Directed by: Shin Oonuma
- Written by: Katsuhiko Takayama
- Music by: Nijine
- Studio: Silver Link
- Licensed by: Crunchyroll (Note: In North America through Crunchyroll, LLC (formerly known as Funimation).); SEA: Muse Communication
- Original network: TV Tokyo
- English network: SEA: Animax Asia; US: Funimation Channel
- Original run: January 7, 2010 – March 31, 2010
- Episodes: 13
- Original video animation

Baka to Test to Shōkanjū: Matsuri
- Directed by: Shin Oonuma
- Written by: Katsuhiko Takayama
- Music by: Nijine
- Studio: Silver Link
- Licensed by: Crunchyroll; SEA: Muse Communication
- Released: February 23, 2011 – March 23, 2011
- Episodes: 2
- Anime television series

Baka to Test to Shōkanjū: Ni!
- Directed by: Shin Oonuma
- Written by: Katsuhiko Takayama
- Music by: Nijine
- Studio: Silver Link
- Licensed by: Crunchyroll; SEA: Muse Communication
- Original network: TV Tokyo
- English network: SEA: Animax Asia; US: Funimation Channel
- Original run: July 8, 2011 – September 30, 2011
- Episodes: 13
- Video game

Baka to Test to Shōkanjū Portable
- Developer: Kadokawa Games
- Genre: Board/Adventure
- Platform: PlayStation Portable
- Released: December 13, 2012
- icon

Baka and Test (Japanese: バカとテストと召喚獣, Hepburn: Baka to Tesuto to Shōkanjū; lit. "Idiots, Tests, and Summoned Beasts"), also known as Baka and Test: Summon the Beasts, is a Japanese light novel series written by Kenji Inoue with illustrations by Yui Haga. The series revolves around Akihisa Yoshii, the titular baka (idiot) and his friends at Fumizuki Academy, a school where students are sorted into classes based on their entrance exam test grades. The top classes receive better classroom equipment and benefits, while the bottom classes receive very little. Class F, the lowest class in the school, are angered by this injustice and vow to fight the higher-level classes for better equipment and respect. Baka and Test was published by Enterbrain, with a total of 18 novels published from January 2007 to March 2015 under its Famitsu Bunko imprint.

A 13-episode anime television series was produced by Silver Link, broadcasting from January to March 2010. This was quickly followed by a two-episode original video animation series in February 2011 titled Baka to Test to Shōkanjū: Matsuri, and a second 13-episode anime television series titled Baka to Test to Shōkanjū: Ni! broadcasting from July to September 2011. Baka and Test additionally received three manga adaptations published by Enterbrain in Famitsu Comic Clear and Kadokawa Shoten in Shōnen Ace, and a PlayStation Portable video game in December 2012.

== Synopsis ==
=== Setting ===
Baka and Test takes place at a fictitious preparatory school called Fumizuki Academy in Japan, said to implement "the finest and most unique systems." Its students are rigidly divided into classes based on their results in an entrance exam. Class A contains the highest scoring students, while Class F contains the lowest scoring students. In addition to this, the classes are given different perks and equipment based on this division. The higher the class, the better the benefits; Class A is filled with prestigious items like air conditioners, fancy seats, laptops, a free snack bar, etc. Meanwhile, Class F is forced to work in a dusty, broken classroom with mats and low wooden tables.

Additionally, Fumizuki Academy has a special system whereby all students are able to call forth Summoned Beings (Shōkanjū, or "Avatars" in the official English translation.) These Beings are able to fight when a teacher gives their approval - their strength depends on their most recent test scores in the approving teacher's subject (i.e. Math, History, etc.) The Being will lose points when struck by an opponent, and should their score reach zero, they are disqualified and must take remedial classes with the strict Soichi Nishimura, (nicknamed "Iron Man") which the students dread. If a student is able to leave the battle without their points reaching zero, they can take a supplemental exam to replenish their score, and return to battle. The primary function of these battles is the "Summoner Test War," where two classes fight with their Beings. The war ends when one class's Representative, the highest scoring student in the class, is defeated in a battle. If a lower ranked class is able to defeat a higher ranked class, they have the option to switch classroom facilities, giving the lower ranked classes a chance to prove themselves and earn better equipment.

=== Plot ===
On the day of the placement test, Mizuki Himeji suffers from a fever and cannot complete it, and is thus given a score of zero, despite her intelligence. She is put into Class F, alongside the rest of the main characters - Akihisa Yoshii (the titular baka), Yuuji Sakamoto (the class representative), Hideyoshi Kinoshita (the bishōnen actor), Kouta Tsuchiya (the perverted photographer, sometimes known as Silent Ninja Pervert, Muttsurīni) and Minami Shimada (a transfer student from Germany who cannot read kanji.)

Akihisa is frustrated by the school's decision to place Himeji in Class F, believing she should've been given another chance at the placement test. He speaks to Yuuji, who also feels unfairly treated by the school's rigid system. They vow to prove to everyone that there's more to life than just test scores by taking down Class A and taking their classroom for themselves. This results in several Summoner Test Wars against higher-ranked classes. The show also loosely follows the love triangle consisting of Minami, Himeji and Akihisa, their crush. Meanwhile, Yuuji is targeted by Shouko Kirishima, a Yandere Class A student who fell in love with Yuuji when they were children.

== Media ==
=== Light novels ===
Baka and Test began as a light novel series written by Kenji Inoue, with illustrations by Yui Haga. Enterbrain published 18 volumes from January 29, 2007, to March 30, 2015, under its Famitsu Bunko imprint; 12 comprise the main story, while the other six are side story collections.

=== Manga ===
A manga adaptation titled Baka to Test to Shōkanjū (バカとテストと召喚獣), illustrated by both Mosuke Mattaku and Yumeuta, began serialization in Kadokawa Shoten's Shōnen Ace with the June 2009 issue sold on April 25, 2009, and ended in the September 2016 issue sold on July 26, 2016. Kadokawa Shoten published 15 tankōbon volumes from December 19, 2009, to November 26, 2016. The English version of the manga adaptation is available on BookWalker. Another manga adaptation, titled Baka to Test to Shōkanjū Ja (バカとテストと召喚獣ぢゃ) and illustrated by Koizumi, was serialized between the February 2010 and January 2014 issues of Shōnen Ace. Kadokawa Shoten published four volumes between August 26, 2010, and January 25, 2014. A third manga adaptation, titled Baka to Test to Shōkanjū Spinout! Sore ga Bokura no Nichijō (バカとテストと召喚獣 SPINOUT! それが僕らの日常。) and illustrated by Namo, was serialized in Enterbrain's online magazine Famitsu Comic Clear between October 30, 2009, and August 12, 2012. Enterbrain published six volumes between May 15, 2010, and August 10, 2012.

=== Anime series ===
A 13-episode anime television series adaptation produced by the animation studio Silver Link, written by Katsuhiko Takayama, and directed by Shin Oonuma aired in Japan between January 7 and March 31, 2010. A two-episode original video animation (OVA) series titled Baka to Test to Shōkanjū: Matsuri were released on Blu-ray and DVD from February 23, 2011, to March 30, 2011. A second anime television series titled Baka to Test to Shōkanjū: Ni! aired in Japan between July 8 and September 30, 2011. Funimation licensed both seasons and the OVAs for distribution in North America. Both seasons have appeared on the Funimation Channel. Muse Communication licensed the series in Southeast Asia and streamed on Muse Asia YouTube channel.

The first anime season's opening theme is "Perfect-area Complete!" by Natsuko Aso, composed by Kenichi Maeyamada. The first ending theme is "Baka Go Home" by Milktub and BakaTest All Stars and the second ending theme is "Hare Tokidoki Egao" by Hitomi Harada, Kaori Mizuhashi, Emiri Katou and Tomomi Isomura. For the Matsuri OVAs, the opening theme is "Ren'ai Kōjō Committee" (恋愛向上committee) by Aso, and the ending theme is "Getsuyō wa Kirai" (月曜はキライ) by Milktub. For the second anime season, the opening theme is "Kimi+Nazo+Watashi de Jump!!" (君+謎+私でJUMP!!) by Larval Stage Planning, and the ending theme is "Eureka Baby" (エウレカベイビー) by Aso.

=== Video game ===
A PlayStation Portable video game titled Baka to Test to Shōkanjū Portable was released on December 13, 2012, in a regular edition and a limited edition box set, both in Japan only. The game is styled like a board game. There are nine characters to choose from—Akihisa, Mizuki, Minami, Yuuji, Hideyoshi, Kouta, Shouko, Yuuko and Miharu—with individual storylines of their own. In the beginning, only Akihisa, Yuuji, Hideyoshi and Kouta can be chosen by default. To unlock the other five characters, the other four characters must first be played in story mode.

In Baka to Test to Shōkanjū Portable, the principal of Fumizuki Academy, Tōdo Kaworu, has implemented a new summoning system in which students put their luck and skills to the test. If one student can win three stages in a row, they may choose a prize of their choice.

== Reception ==
The Baka and Test anime television series has received positive reviews, from fans and critics. Writing for Anime News Network, Carl Kimlinger gave both seasons of the anime a B−, praising the series' sharp comedy and style, while criticizing the writing of its female characters.

== See also ==
- Grand Blue Dreaming, a manga series written by Kenji Inoue
