= Eric Vale =

American voice actor (born 1974)

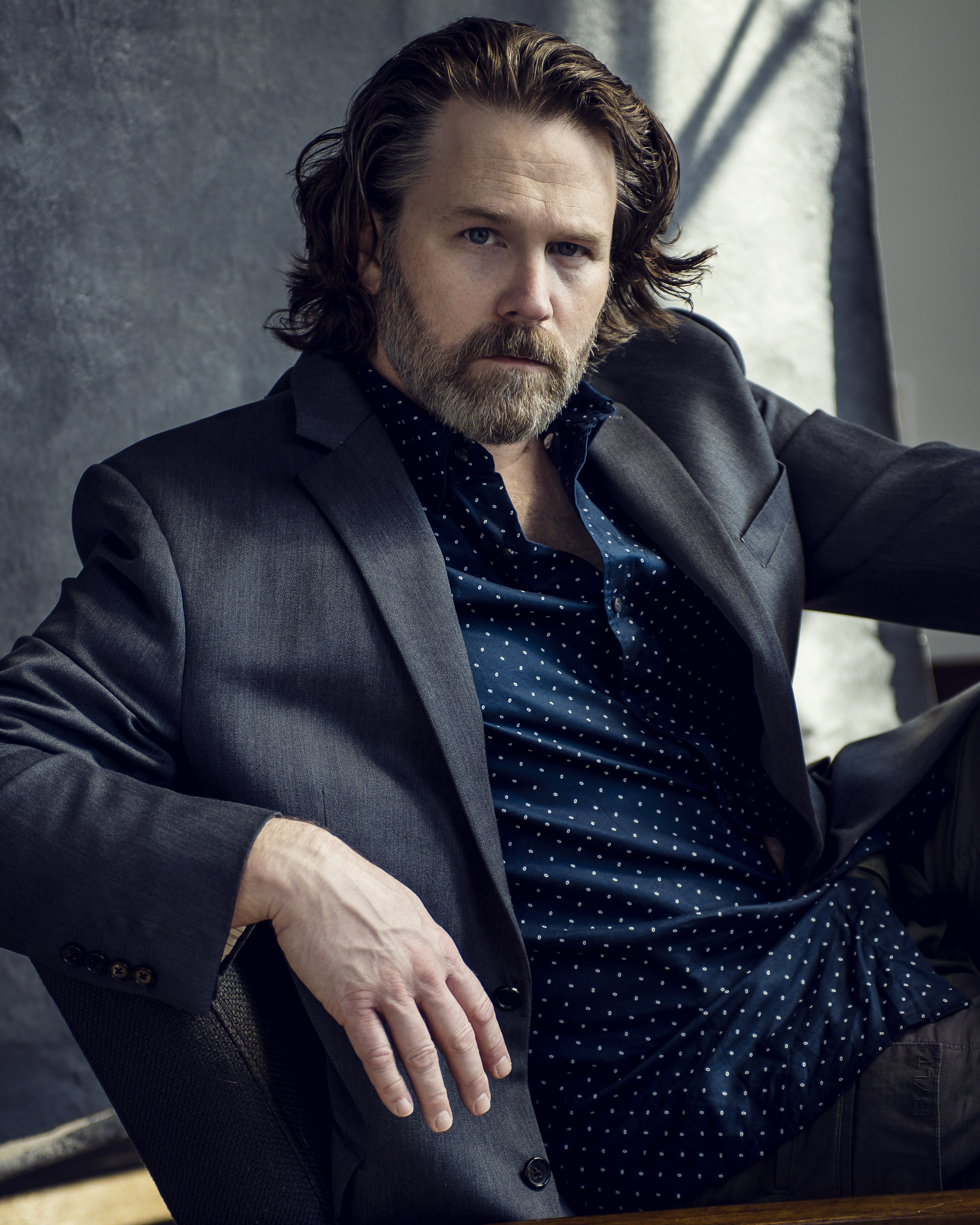
- Vale in 2021
- Born: Christopher Eric Johnson; Grand Prairie, Texas, United States
- Occupations: Voice actor; director; writer; producer
- Years active: 1999–present
- Agent: Mary Collins
- Spouse: Alese Watson (m. 2003)
- Children: 2
- Website: www.therealericvale.com

Christopher Eric Johnson, better known as Eric Vale, is an American voice actor featured in numerous English versions of Japanese anime series. Some of these include Yuki Soma from Fruits Basket, Sanji from One Piece, Tomura Shigaraki from My Hero Academia, Canada and America from Hetalia: Axis Powers, and Future Trunks from Dragon Ball Z.

== Career ==
He is known for voicing Koichiro Iketani in the Initial D series, Trunks in the Dragon Ball series, Sanji in One Piece, Kogoro Akechi in Trickster, Keisuke Umehara in Big Windup!, Huey Laforet in Baccano!, Tobari Durandal Kumohira in Nabari no Ou, Jean Croce in Gunslinger Girl series, Kisumi Shigino in Free! series, Kakeru Ryuen in Classroom of the Elite, Solf J. Kimblee in Fullmetal Alchemist, Kazuma in Noragami series, Tsunenaga Tamaki in Deadman Wonderland, Qisha Tianling in Chaos Dragon, Akechi in Rampo Kitan: Game of Laplace, Casshern in Casshern Sins, Hayato Kujo in Aquarion Logos, America and Canada in the Hetalia: Axis Powers series, Ferid Bathory in the Seraph of the End series, Yuki Soma in Fruits Basket series, Tenko "Tomura Shigaraki" Shimura in My Hero Academia, Loke in Fairy Tail and Phoenix Wright from Ace Attorney.

== Personal life ==
Vale's daughter is on the autism spectrum.

== Filmography ==
=== Anime ===
List of voice performances in anime
Year	Title	Role	Crew role, notes	Source
1999–present	Dragon Ball series	Future Trunks, Adult Present Trunks, World Martial Arts Tournament Announcer, Dr. Flappe	Funimation dub	
2001	YuYu Hakusho	Sakyo, Rando, Kokoda Hatanaka		
2002	Fruits Basket	Yuki Soma	also 2019 reboot	
2003	Blue Gender	Yuji Kaido		
2004	Fullmetal Alchemist	Solf J. Kimblee		
2005	Desert Punk	Kanta Mizuno		
2005	Gunslinger Girl series	Jean Croce		
2006	Mamotte! Lollipop	Zero	Funimation dub	
2007	B't X	Teppei Takamiya	Illumitoon dub	
2007–present	One Piece	Sanji, World Tournament Announcer (Ep. 590)	Funimation dub	
2007	School Rumble series	Oji Karasuma		
2008	Hetalia: Axis Powers series	America, Canada	Funimation dub	
2008	Blassreiter	Alvin "Al" Lutz		
2009	Kenichi: The Mightiest Disciple	Hermit	Season 2 only	
2009	D.Gray-man	Arystar Krory III	also Hallow	
2009	Nabari no Ou	Tobari Durandal Kumohira		
2009	Spice and Wolf	Weiz		
2010	Initial D	Koichiro Iketani	Funimation dub	
2010	Soul Eater	Justin Law		
2010	Casshern Sins	Casshern		
2011	Dance in the Vampire Bund	Akira Kaburagi Regendorf	Credited as Alpha Lagrange	
2011	Fullmetal Alchemist: Brotherhood	Solf J. Kimblee		
2011–2019	Fairy Tail	Loke		
2012	Deadman Wonderland	Tsunenaga Tamaki		
2012	Is This a Zombie?	King of the Night		
2013	We Without Wings	Hariu Kurodo		
2013	Aesthetica of a Rogue Hero	Akatsuki Ousawa		
2013	Last Exile: Fam, the Silver Wing	Victor		
2013	Maken-ki! Battling Venus series	Akaya Kodai		
2014	Ghost in the Shell: Arise	Tsumugi		
2014	Jormungand series	Kasper Hekmatyar		
2014	Robotics;Notes	Ko Kimijima		
2014–2018	Tokyo Ghoul	Nishiki Nishio		
2014	Attack on Titan	Luke Cis	season 1	
2014	Sengoku Basara: Judge End	Keiji Maeda		
2015	Assassination Classroom	Kensaku Ono	Funimation Dub Eps. 1, 3, 6, 7	
2015	Death Parade	Takashi	Eps. 1–2	
2015	Gangsta	Barry Abbott	Eps. 1, 4	
2015	Noragami	Kazuma		
2015	Ping Pong: The Animation	Egami		
2015	Prison School	Takehito "Gakuto" Morokuzu		
2015	Seraph of the End	Ferid Bathory		
2015	Yona of the Dawn	Sinha		
2016	Aquarion Logos	Hayato Kujo		
2016	Brothers Conflict	Iori Asahina		
2016	Chaos Dragon	Qisha Tianling		
2016	Dimension W	Albert Schuman		
2016	First Love Monster	Kanade Takahashi		
2016–2025	My Hero Academia	Tomura Shigaraki		
2016	Snow White with the Red Hair	Izana Wisteria		
2016	Terror in Resonance	Kato		
2016	Joker Game	Jiro Gamo		
2016	Trickster	Kogoro Akechi		
2016	Rampo Kitan: Game of Laplace	Akechi		
2016	The Vision of Escaflowne	Dryden Fassa	Funimation dub	
2016, 2022	Overlord	Pandora's Actor		
2017	Knight's & Magic	Tsubasa Kurata		
2017	Sakura Quest	Soichiro Koharu	Episode: "The Queen, Convicted"	
2017–present	Classroom of the Elite	Kakeru Ryuen		
2017	A Sister's All You Need	Kenjiro Toki		
2018–2019	Ace Attorney	Phoenix Wright	anime adaptation	
2018	Darling in the Franxx	Hachi		
2018	Hakata Tonkotsu Ramens	Yamato		
2018	Junji Ito Collection	Makoto Tokura	Ep. 5B	
2018	B't X	Teppei Takamiya	Anime Midstream dub	
2018–2021	How Not to Summon a Demon Lord	Takuma Sakamoto/Diablo		
2018–2019	Black Clover	Fanzell Kruger		
2018–present	That Time I Got Reincarnated as a Slime	Kurobe		
2018–2020	Radiant	Grim		
2019	Boogiepop and Others	Kentarou Habara	5 episodes	
2019	YU-NO: A Girl Who Chants Love at the Bound of this World	Takuya Arima		
2019–present	Fire Force	Arthur Boyle		
2020	Plunderer	Licht Bach		
2021	Moriarty the Patriot	Marquis Glover		
2021	Life Lessons with Uramichi Oniisan	Tekito Derekida		
2021	The World Ends With You: The Animation	Eiji Oji		
2022	Kakegurui	Ibara Obami	Sentai Filmworks dub	
2022	Aoashi	Tatsuya Fukuda		
2022	Spy × Family	Zachry Feiss	Episode: "Will They Pass or Fail"	
2022	Shinobi no Ittoki	Kidou Minobe		
2023	Mobile Suit Gundam: The Witch from Mercury	Nuno		
2023	Tengoku Daimakyo	Robin		
2023	My Home Hero	Yoshitatsu		
2023–present	Shangri-La Frontier	Rakuro/Sunraku		
2024	Banished from the Hero's Party	Godwin	Season 2	
2024	Metallic Rouge	Gene Junghardt		
2024–present	Spice and Wolf: Merchant Meets the Wise Wolf	Weiz		
2024–2025	Go! Go! Loser Ranger!	Eigen Urabe		
2025	Wind Breaker	Kongo	Season 2	
2025	To Be Hero X	Vortex		
2026	Daemons of the Shadow Realm	Hayato Shingo	Eps. 12–13	

=== Films ===
List of dubbing performances in anime films
Year	Title	Role	Crew role, notes	Source
2009	One Piece Film: Strong World	Sanji		
2010	Hetalia: Axis Powers – Paint It, White!	America		
2012	Sengoku Basara: The Last Party	Keiji Maeda		
2012	Mass Effect: Paragon Lost	Essex		
2014	One Piece Film: Z	Sanji		
2016	The Boy and the Beast	Kyuta		
2017	One Piece Film: Gold	Sanji		
2019	One Piece: Stampede	Sanji		
2022	Fruits Basket: Prelude	Yuki Soma		
2022	Dragon Ball Super: Super Hero	Trunks, Fat Gotenks		
2022	One Piece Film: Red	Sanji		

=== Video games ===
List of dubbing performances in video games
Year	Title	Role	Crew role, notes	Source
2002	Dragon Ball Z: Budokai	Future Trunks		
2003	Dragon Ball Z: Budokai 2	Future Trunks, World Martial Arts Tournament Announcer		
2004	Seven Samurai 20XX	Additional voices		
2004	Dragon Ball Z: Supersonic Warriors	Future Trunks		
2004	Dragon Ball Z Budokai: 3	Future Trunks, World Martial Arts Tournament Announcer		
2005	Dragon Ball Z: Sagas	Future Trunks		
2005	Spikeout: Battle Street	Additional voices		
2005	Dragon Ball Z: Budokai Tenkaichi	Future Trunks, World Martial Arts Tournament Announcer		
2006	Dragon Ball Z: Shin Budokai	Future Trunks		
2006	Super Dragon Ball Z	Future Trunks		
2006	Dragon Ball Z: Budokai Tenkaichi 2	Future Trunks		
2007	Dragon Ball Z: Shin Budokai – Another Road	Future Trunks, World Martial Arts Tournament Announcer		
2007	Dragon Ball Z: Budokai Tenkaichi 3	Future Trunks		
2008	One Piece: Unlimited Adventure	Sanji		
2008	Dragon Ball Z: Burst Limit	Future Trunks		
2008	Dragon Ball Z: Infinite World	Future Trunks		
2009	Dragon Ball: Revenge of King Piccolo	World Martial Arts Tournament Announcer		
2009	Dragon Ball: Raging Blast	Future Trunks		
2010	Dragon Ball Z: Tenkaichi Tag Team	Future Trunks		
2010	Dragon Ball: Raging Blast 2	Future Trunks		
2011	Dragon Ball Z: Ultimate Tenkaichi	Future Trunks		
2012	Borderlands 2	Boom Bewm, Will the Bandit, McNally		
2012	Dragon Ball Z: For Kinect	Future Trunks		
2014	Dragon Ball Z: Battle of Z	Future Trunks		
2015	Dragon Ball Xenoverse	Future Trunks		
2016	Dragon Ball Xenoverse 2	Future Trunks		
2018	Dragon Ball FighterZ	Future Trunks, World Martial Arts Tournament Announcer		
2018	Dragon Ball Legends	Future Trunks, Trunks (adult)		
2020	Dragon Ball Z: Kakarot	Future Trunks, World Martial Arts Tournament Announcer		
2020	My Hero One's Justice 2	Tomura Shigaraki		
2021	Tales of Luminaria	Hugo Simon		
