= List of Deadman Wonderland characters =

The principal characters of Deadman Wonderland. From left to right: Tamaki, Yō, Makina, Ganta, and Shiro.

This is a list of fictional characters appearing in the Japanese manga series Deadman Wonderland as well as its anime adaptation.

== Main characters ==
=== Ganta Igarashi ===
Voiced by: Romi Park (Japanese); Greg Ayres (English)

Ganta Igarashi (五十嵐 丸太, Igarashi Ganta) / Woodpecker is the main protagonist of the story. He is a seemingly harmless, ordinary middle school boy until the Wretched Egg slaughters his entire class, yet spares him and infuses him with a shard of red crystal. Posing as Ganta's appointed lawyer, Tsunenaga Tamaki rigs evidence at his trial to make it look like he murdered his classmates on a whim. Ganta is sentenced to death at Deadman Wonderland. Initially confused and frightened, Ganta resolves to endure the heinous prison so he can prove his innocence and avenge his friends by tracking down and confronting their murderer, the Wretched Egg, whom Ganta refers to as the 'Red Man'. During his stay, Ganta meets a mysterious girl named Shiro and is perplexed that she seems to know him, but eventually begins to remember her as a childhood friend. While the extent of his feelings for her are unclear in the anime, he later falls in love with her in the manga. Ganta learns that the crystal implanted into his chest by the Wretched Egg has turned him into a "Deadman" empowered with a Branch of Sin, which is later christened the Ganta Gun by Senji. This Branch of Sin enables Ganta to gather variable quantities of his blood in the palm of his hand and shoot them like bullets. While advantageous as a long-range attack, due to Ganta's small size, this strategy puts him at risk of experiencing symptoms of excessive blood loss. Ganta later joins up with the Scar Chain and participates in their attempt to break out of Deadman Wonderland and expose the prison's illegal actions, but chooses to remain behind to settle his score with the Wretched Egg. Shortly after these events, learning that Shiro is the Wretched Egg, Ganta's power began to change, evident by a strange tattoo-like mark radiating out from the crystal in his chest. His Ganta Gun now emits a much more powerful blast than before, though it is much less controllable and causes him physical pain. Following the defeat of Genkaku, Ganta ends up in solitary confinement for withholding information about the escape of the surviving Scar Chain members. Eventually, the truth about Deadman Wonderland is made public. When Deadman Wonderland is shut down, Ganta is exonerated of the false charges put upon him at his retrial. With nowhere else to go after his name is cleared, Ganta ended up in Minori Garden orphanage which is run by nuns. He then joins forces with the former prison's Chief Guard Makina, Senji, and several other Deadmen, and return to the prison to locate and stop Shiro (who has now been completely "consumed" by her Wretched Egg persona). By that time, Ganta learns that his mother Sorae Igarashi was the one who turned Shiro into the Wretched Egg for the Chief Director of Deadman Wonderland and that his Branch of Sin is "key" that can unlock the Mother Goose system and unleash Shiro's full power. He also learns from Shiro that it also has the power to kill her. She also reveals that he was the one originally selected to be experimented on, but his mother chose to spare him, and experimented on Shiro instead. This led to her transformation into the "Wretched Egg". The reason she killed his classmates and implanted the gem in him is that she wants to be killed by the one she has always loved. Upon learning of Shiro's true self and intentions, he agrees to kill her, leading to their final confrontation. In the final battle, the crystals within Ganta and Shiro explode upon overusing their powers. Sometime later, Ganta visits a comatose Shiro in the hospital and later reminisces about his past with Shiro and his mother. When Ganta asks Shiro if she wants to hear how the lullaby his mother wrote for her goes on, Shiro wakes up with a smile.

=== Shiro ===
Voiced by: Kana Hanazawa (Japanese); Monica Rial (English)

Shiro (シロ) / Wretched Egg is a mysterious albino girl and Hagire Rinichirō's test subject that Ganta encountered during his first days as an inmate: Ganta mistook her for his dead friend Mimi due to Shiro resembling her. Clothed only in a skin-tight bodysuit (though her heels and toes stick out in the foot areas) and large gloves which help conceal her heavily scarred skin, Shiro stands out among the other prisoners due to her bizarre appearance and mannerisms along with lacking a prison number. To Ganta, Shiro's manner of speaking and behavior remind him of a small child, even though Shiro is in fact a year older than him. However, Shiro possesses inhuman physical abilities and has an intimate knowledge of the prison, having lived there most of her life. From the beginning of the story it is made clear that, as children, Shiro and Ganta were close friends with the latter having no memories of his childhood, which greatly saddens and annoys Shiro. Shiro was infected with a mysterious virus that gave her abilities which was being researched by Ganta's mother Sorae Igarashi, making her the test subject instead of Ganta. Over the next several years, Shiro was subjected to barbaric experiments, including being dismembered while awake, all in an effort to force her body and the virus inside it to "evolve" into the first Deadman.

The trauma of this torturous treatment caused Shiro to create a second personality called Wretched Egg a homicidal maniac capable of mass slaughter and causing an earthquake in Tokyo. Unaware of Shiro's alter ego when she framed him after butchering his class, Ganta knew her as the "Red Man" due to basing her heavy masculine full body clothing after the Aceman character she and Ganta watched and played with as children. Shiro is placed within Deadman Wonderland in comfortable quarters due to being the "source" of the Branches of Sin, the Mother Goose mainframe playing a lullaby audible only to Shiro in order to repress her second personality. Eventually revealing her feelings of love and resentment for Ganta, Shiro reveals that her personalities have merge once the Mother Goose system's lullaby is destroyed. She also explains that she orchestrated Ganta's incarceration and Branch of Sin implant so he can kill her rather than continue living as a Deadman. In the final battle, the crystals within Ganta and Shiro explode upon overusing their powers with Shiro ending up in a coma before she awakens in the final scene.

== Deadman Wonderland staff ==
=== Rinichirō Hagire ===
Voiced by: Hiroshi Naka (Japanese); R. Bruce Elliott (English)

Rinichirō Hagire (剥切 燐一郎, Hagire Rinichirō) is the main antagonist of the series. He is the one who created Deadman Wonderland and orchestrated the creation of Shiro's Wretched Egg persona in the experiments he conducted with Sorae Igarashi back when he was a doctor at a Medical Center. After the Great Tokyo earthquake, Hagire used the Branch of Sin of Chan and En to enter the body of the man who would become the Director of Deadman Wonderland so he can gather Deadmen for further experimentation with Carnival Corpse as a means to select a new stronger body to occupy. As the story opens, Hagire's vessel has become terminally ill, with Tsunenaga Tamaki running the prison in the hope that when he dies, he can rule Deadman Wonderland unopposed. However, presumed to have been killed by the Wretched Egg, Hagire transferred his consciousness into the body of Toto and proceeded to undermine Tamaki's agenda. Following Hagire's "death," Tamaki salvaged his head and used it for his personal bowling game. As a result, Hagire gained Toto's Love Labyrinth ability and uses it to find the ideal Deadman whose Branch of Sin can unlock the Mother Goose system in order to release the Wretched Egg's full powers to recreate the events of the Great Tokyo earthquake. When Tamaki's plans were thwarted, Hagire revealed himself in Toto's body much to the dismay of Tamaki who then kills himself claiming that Deadman Wonderland is his "game". Afterwards, Hagire escapes deep into Deadman Wonderland with Shiro as its prison part closes. Finding Ganta to be the ideal specimen yet unable to bypass the Mother Goose system's lock via Toto's ability, Hagire attempts to get transferred into the boy's body when Senji manages to arrive in time to stop it. He is eventually defeated and killed by Ganta shortly after the Mother Goose system was unlocked.

=== Tsunenaga Tamaki ===
Voiced by: Junichi Suwabe (Japanese); Eric Vale (English)

Tsunenaga Tamaki (玉木 常長, Tamaki Tsunenaga) is a major antagonist of the first half of the story. He is the Chief Warden and de facto tyrant of Deadman Wonderland with a fox or weasel-like appearance who also serves as the prison's promoter. In the English dub of the anime, he is the son of the Prison Director whom Rinichirō Hagire transferred his being into. Under his calm, almost idiotic attitude, he is something of a sadist with connections to the Japanese government and is not above butchering dozens of prisoners every day for the sole purpose of profit, science, and mainly for his own twisted amusement. Before the Great Tokyo earthquake, Tamaki was an indifferent otaku and a recluse who secluded himself in his room to play video games on his computer without a care. He went insane when the earthquake destroyed his computer and badly injured his mother (who Tamaki let die because he was too busy mourning his computer), which led to him engineer Deadman Wonderland as a gigantic game to keep playing as he did before the earthquake. He posed as a lawyer to rig evidence that would get Ganta sentenced to Deadman Wonderland. In the anime, he posed as a judge at Minatsuki's trial to get her sent to Deadman Wonderland. When it came to Ganta's first fight in the Carnival Corpse, Tamaki revealed to Ganta that he rigged the evidence at his trial and even tortures him by showing him footage of the different Carnival Corpse fights. While running Deadman Wonderland, Tamaki devoted much of his time with studying and experimenting with the Branch of Sin, invented the Worm Eater which he gave to the Undertakers to neutralize the Deadman's Branch of Sin, received funding from Major Aohi for the Forgeries, and made different plans to kill the Wretched Egg. Ultimately, Tamaki's schemes fall apart thanks to Ganta, his allies, and Makina. Tamaki and those present are then confronted by Toto (now a vessel of Rinichirō Hagire). Refusing to accept himself as Hagire's pawn, Tamaki commits suicide by shooting himself in the head as an ultimate assurance (but mostly delusion) that this was his, and only his, game.

=== Makina ===
Voiced by: Takako Honda (Japanese); Colleen Clinkenbeard (English)

Makina (マキナ, Makina) is a harsh and cold chief of the prison guards. She serves as the chief enforcer which does not hesitate in punishing, often brutally, the prison's population. Before Deadman Wonderland, Makina was in the Special Forces. Known for her demeanor and her large breasts (G-cup size), Makina is infamous for carrying a decorated sword on her person at all times, and also for using it to cut whoever breaks the prison's rules (like she did when Yō Takami "stole" antidote candy from Ganta and she cut him with her sword when he wouldn't return it), acts that almost always result in bloodshed. When Ganta commented that Makina was insane after she slashed Yō Takami, Makina quotes that reality is made to be unfair and unjust. Despite her brutality, Makina is far less twisted than Tamaki (whom she is greatly suspicious of) especially after discovering that her authority is limited. Eventually, after learning Tamaki's agenda, Makina forfeits her position to hunt him down with the aid of some allies in Ganta and the other Deadmen. When it came to Makina hunting for Tamaki, she had previously met Karako after her escape and had the Worm Eater technology embedded in her sword. After the suicide of Tamaki, she came into possession of the data regarding the Wretched Egg, the Deadmen, and the Forgeries and then oversaw the shutdown of Deadman Wonderland's prison area. When it came time to confront the Wretched Egg after an earlier military attack failed that had her recuperating in a wheelchair, Makina led the Deadmen in a fight against the Wretched Egg and Hagire.

=== Kyoko Kasuga ===
Voiced by: Chika Horikawa (Japanese); Mary Morgan (English)

Kyoko Kasuga is a prison guard in Deadman Wonderland who was the personal assistant of Makina. She holds a large sense of admiration for Makina, which is implied to be romantic. Though it is unknown whether Makina reciprocates or is even aware of her feelings, she apparently has strong feelings of trust towards Kyōko. Enough to bring her along while searching for top secret information relating to G-Ward. Kyōko is occasionally used as a comic relief character.

=== Rei Takashima ===
Voiced by: Mina (Japanese); Lydia Mackay (English)

Dr. Rei Takashima is a physician who works at Deadman Wonderland. She was charged with the duty of removing the specific parts of the Deadmen that lose in Carnival Corpse and had survived (she removes the parts without applying anesthetic to the Deadman) where she shows off a sadistic side when doing it. Of course Rei also becomes enraged when she doesn't get to remove a non-regenerative organ. Rei was the one who told Ganta about the live-saving candy after Tamaki collapsed the tower on Ganta and Rei patched Ganta up. After Senji was defeated by Ganta, Rei showed off her sadistic side when she was ordered to remove Senji's right eye while even licking her lips at the same time. She later got frustrated when Nagi rigged the macabre slot machine so that she would only cut off Minatsuki's hair. Rei later helped Tamaki with his experiment that involved the Forgeries where she gave Azami Midō her Snake Branch of Sin, making her a Forgery. She even experimented on Ganta after Tamaki had the Forgeries bring Ganta to him. While in her laboratory near the end of the "Revolt Arc," Rei is killed by an unknown being (most likely the Wretched Egg).

=== Chan and En ===
Chan Voiced by: Shohei Kajikawa (Japanese); Micah Solusod (English)
En Voiced by: Yuka Saitō (Japanese); Apphia Yu (English)

Chan and En (チャン & エン) are Hagire's twin albino bodyguards, respectively male and female, who are like-minded and see Hagire as a father figure that they cherish deeply to the point of killing anyone who insults him. The two, however, were forced to make an exception in Tamaki when he becomes the new Chief Warden of Deadman Wonderland and celebrated his promotion by using the head of the previous director, Hagire's previous body, as a bowling ball. The twins both share the Branch of Sin known as Hollow Swallow, a means that Hagire uses to transfer his conscious mind into a new body while erasing the victim's mind. When the two attempt to transfer Hagire into Ganta, the process is interrupted by Senji who kills them with an attack meant for Hagire.

They are named after Chang and Eng Bunker, the original Siamese Twins.

=== Necro Macro ===
The Necro Macro is a robot that was built in Deadman Wonderland. The Necro Macros are used for battling and capturing powerful prisoners such as Deadmen. A Necro Macro was once used to capture Senji Kiyomasa with 24 prisoners killed in the process. A Necro Macro was used to capture Ganta (who was seen with Shiro and Yō at the time). The Necro Macro followed Ganta, Shiro, and Yō into the ventilation system and was about to fire at Ganta when Yō ripped off one of the wires around its neck, causing the Necro Macro having a short circuit. It recovered and stopped the group again at the entrance of G Ward. It was about to fire its cannon at Ganta and the others when Shiro kicked the robot and sent it flying. It came back and grabbed Shiro. But then, strings of blood came from the entrance and destroyed the Necro Macro. It appears that Senji broke out and saved Ganta. He also did it to get even to the Necro Macro. A second Necro Macro model was seen when Scar Chain triggered the floor sensors on their way to the elevator. This model can shoot highly corrosive acidic fluids. It spat some acid at Kōmoto and then ran over him. The Necro Macro was destroyed by Karako.

== Deadman Wonderland inmates ==
=== Kiyomasa Senji ===
Voiced by: Masayuki Katou (Japanese); Patrick Seitz (English)

Kiyomasa Senji (千地 清正, Senji Kiyomasa) / Crow is the first Deadman (other than Shiro) that Ganta encounters while held as an inmate in Deadman Wonderland. He is a tall and powerfully built man who revels in battle, allowing him to enjoy prison life and Carnival Corpse matches. Often, Senji gets flustered or starts blushing whenever women with a big breast size, nice body, etc. are around him, telling them to "Put some clothes on!" He especially acts this way towards Shiro regarding her skin tight body suit. His Branch of Sin power is the Crow Claws, creating scythe blades on his forearms to attack at a speed of sound he dubs Invisible Black. Originally a police officer, less crazy at that time, Senji used his Branch of Sin to fight criminals, encountering a fellow Deadman named Keigo Ugachi and later Ikazuchi Akatsuki. Losing his teammates Shindō, Momoi, Kan and his mentor Domon to Akatsuki before killing him, Senji had first letters of his teammates' names tattooed on the right side of his forehead in memory of them. At some point after his fight with Ikazuchi Akatsuki, Senji was remanded to Deadman Wonderland. Being Ganta's first opponent, he apparently dominates their entire battle until Ganta suddenly defeats him. Though losing his right eye in the penalty game and now wearing a black eyepatch, Senji respected Ganta since their fight and supported him as a rival, demanding of him that he not be defeated by anyone before rematch. When it came to the "Revolt Arc," Senji helps Ganta in his fight against the Forgeries where he managed to defeat Ikazuchi Akatsuki. After being released from Deadman Wonderland, Senji tries to apply for a job at a corporation. Senji joins forces with Makina to help destroy/suppress the Wretched Egg. In the process, Senji saves Ganta from Hagire by killing off Chen and En at the cost of his right arm. Some time later after Ganta's fight with the Wretched Egg, Senji was seen in the mountains practicing some mountain climbing with an unnamed Deadman.

=== Yō Takami ===
Voiced by: Yūki Kaji (Japanese); Aaron Dismuke (English)

Yō Takami (鷹見 羊, Takami Yō), a habitual thief and an informant to Tamaki, Yō was hired to watch over Ganta in return of large amounts for Cast Points. Though apparently friendly and polite, in truth he is ruthless, scheming and somewhat paranoid, given his position as a spy for the prison's staff. A rarity among the prison population, Yō willingly became a prisoner of Deadman Wonderland in hopes of finding his sister Minatsuki and buying her freedom with the accumulated Cast Points he got from Tamaki. Yō Takami once tried to steal Ganta's life-saving candy only to be caught by Makina who decided to overlook it if he gives the candy back. When Yō refused, Makina slashed him. He cares deeply about his sister Minatsuki so much so that he is often thought of suffering from a sister complex much to Minatsuki's disgust. Ganta and Yō eventually manage to forge an estranged relationship. When he confronted Tamaki with a deal to let him use Cast Points to get his sister pardoned from Deadman Wonderland, Tamaki states that Cast Points don't work that way. Before Yō can retaliate, he is badly wounded by Azumu Genkaku who then dropped his body to where Nagi and Karako were meeting with Ganta. Minatsuki later tended to Yō's wounds. After being released from Deadman Wonderland, Yō is later offered to help Makina destroy/suppress the Wretched Egg.

=== Minatsuki Takami ===
Voiced by: Iori Nomizu (Japanese); Leah Clark (English)

Minatsuki Takami (鷹見 水名月, Takami Minatsuki) / Hummingbird is Yō Takami's younger sister, a Deadman whose mind was warped on the day of the Great Tokyo earthquake when her mother died after she left Minatsuki to die. Since then, Minatsuki became a sociopathic liar who gets sexually aroused from others' suffering as she later developed the Branch of Sin called Whip Wing, taking the form of blood-made whips which extend from her hair and can deliver immensely quick blows or restrain her opponent. Having manipulated Yō to think that their father was physically abusing her, Minatsuki eventually murders him with her powers. Ending up at G-Ward soon after, Minatsuki made herself appear as an extremely shy and gentle girl to mask her true nature and lower opponents' guard until she fights them in Carnival Corpse. She lost more than once while fighting in the Carnival Corpse, losing half of her stomach and a kidney. Encountering Ganta with knowledge that he is to be her opponent, Minatsuki played on his sympathy to catch him off guard when their match begins. Though intending to play Yō when he appears during the match, Minatsuki is shocked to learn that her brother knows the truth about her killing their father as she uses him as a shield before Ganta defeats her using the ricochet from his shots followed by a head-butt. After the fight, Minatsuki is taken to the medical care prior to Hagire's fight with Wretched Egg nearly causing Minatsuki to get crushed by class closet when Yō risks his well-being to save her after everything she had done to him. When it came to the penalty, the slot machine was rigged by Nagi and some Scar Chain members so she would only have her hair cut off much to the dismay of Dr. Rei Takashima (who disliked removing regenerating organs). Minatsuki reconciled with Yō, though she still violently lashes out on occasion. Minatsuki later tended to Yō after he was attacked by Azumu Genkaku. When it came to the "Revolt Arc," Minatsuki is among the Deadmen that helps Ganta in his fight with the Forgeries. She and Chaplin fight against Uzume Sumeragi and managed to defeat her. After being released from Deadman Wonderland, Minatsuki is transferred into a regular prison before later offering to help Makina destroy/suppress the Wretched Egg.

=== Toto Sakigami ===
Voiced by: Miyuki Sawashiro (Japanese); Ryan Reynolds (English)

Toto Sakigami (咲神 トト, Sakigami Toto) / Mockingbird is a mysterious Deadman feared even by Senji, Toto is a mysterious boy dressed similarly to Shiro and is the strongest Deadman as well as the most psychotic. Prior to his imprisonment, Toto had an older sister who had died protecting him in the big earthquake. His power, Love Labyrinth, allows him to copy and use the abilities of other Deadmen. Toto is said to have been the only person to have fought the Wretched Egg and lived. But in reality, Toto's body is occupied by Hagire, pretending to be Toto until he reveals himself to Tamaki. Toto dies when Hagire is killed by Ganta.

=== Masaru "Chaplin" Sukegawa ===
Masaru "Chaplin" Sukegawa (チョップリン 助川, Choppurin Sukegawa) / Peacock is an announcer for most of the "Carnival Corpse" duels. She is often found around Minatsuki, Itadaki "Masu" Kazuya, and Hitara. Her card is Peacock and her Branch of Sin Peacock Peak allows her to create what appear to be bramble-like constructs that can be used to trap and pierce opponents. Before being imprisoned, she was a salaryman who awoke to her Deadman powers after finding her lover with a woman, she then broke down and killed her lover with one of her thorns. She is shown as having been presenting as male before the murder, indicating that she transitioned whilst at Deadman Wonderland. Ganta first encountered her in the G-Ward at the time when Senji was having his right eye surgically removed by Rei Takashima. When it came to the "Revolt Arc," Chaplin is among the Deadmen that helps Ganta in his fight with the Forgeries. She and Minatsuki fight against Uzume Sumeragi and managed to defeat her. After being released from Deadman Wonderland, she is put into a regular prison. Later, she joins forces with Makina to help destroy/suppress the Wretched Egg. Chaplin only appears in the manga.

=== Idaki Hitara ===
Idaki Hitara (火多良 懐, Hitari Idaki) / Condor is an old man who always claims to be talking to his daughter through his distinctive headset. He wears a headband over his eyes and underneath his headset. As we learn through a flashback, Hitara was a teacher whose daughter Yuki (once a beautiful TV starlet) was horribly disfigured during the Great Tokyo earthquake and committed suicide by setting herself on fire. Hirata claimed responsibility for the fact and was thus imprisoned. His Branch of Sin is called Condor Candle and enables him to ignite his blood into flames "that can burn ice." When it came to the "Revolt Arc," Hitara is among the Deadmen that helps Ganta in his fight with the Forgeries. His complete Forgery opponent's were a pair of 30-year-old twins who appeared in the form of toddlers. The twins "sleep inducing" blood poison did not seem to affect Hitara, and he was able to finish them off, after spreading his blood all around them during a seemingly losing battle. After being released from Deadman Wonderland, Idaki visited his daughter's grave telling her that it's a beautiful day. Idaki joins forces with Makina to help destroy/suppress the Wretched Egg. Hitara only appears in the manga.

=== Itadaki Kazuya ===
Voiced by: Akira Harada (Japanese); Keith Kubal (English)

Itadaki Kazuya is a large Deadman who is known for eating a lot and eating anything that wasn't food. It wasn't revealed how Itadaki ended up in Deadman Wonderland. He was first seen welcoming Ganta to G-Ward following Senji's defeat and was unbothered when Senji's right eye was surgically removed. He once tried to eat Minatsuki's flowers only for Ganta to intervene and offer up his breakfast. After Deadman Wonderland was exposed and shut down, Itadaki was transferred to a normal prison where he was granted a re-trial. Itadaki was seen eating his urinal and the cell walls.

=== Kōzuji Kazumasa ===
Voiced by: Takeshi Maruyama (Japanese); Lee Murphy (English)

Kōzuji Kazumasa is a mixed martial artist and an inmate at Deadman Wonderland. In the anime, his history stated that he was sentenced to Deadman Wonderland for attacking an actress on a variety show when she wouldn't give him her E-Mail. Ganta first encounters him in the cafeteria where he forces him to laugh at the prisoner he was harassing. Ganta encountered him again at the Dog Race where he tried to threaten Shiro and nearly attacked Ganta until Makina stops them. During the whole Dog Race, he tried hard to stay alive and win by cheating and tells his minions to kill Ganta, which they failed. During the final round, it was him, Ganta, Shiro and other prisoners. He tries a direct attack on Ganta, but fails after the panels collapsed. While falling, he kicks the ball from Ganta's hands and throws a knife at him which Shiro blocks with her body. In the manga, Kōzuji survived the fall at the end with minor wounds. He was approached by Makina who states her knowledge of how he cheated and gives him a choice between either being stabbed in the heart by Makina using his own knife on him or serving a year in solitary confinement. Kōzuji chooses solitary confinement. When Deadman Wonderland was exposed and shut down, Kōzuji was among the prisoners that were transferred to another prison. In the anime, Kōzuji dies upon getting impaled by the spikes below the platform.

=== Yosuga Mitsuzaki ===
Yosuga Mitsuzaki (密崎 ヨスガ, Mitsuzaki Yosuga) is a mysterious girl who claims to have known and loved Toto before he "changed." While not actually appearing until after its closing, she is an inmate at Deadman Wonderland. After the Great Tokyo earthquake, Yosuga was arrested for a crime that she didn't commit and was sentenced to Deadman Wonderland. She seems to doubt herself repeatedly and speaks in third person. Later, it is shown that she was friends with Toto before he was taken over by Rinichirō Hagire. Although they are not related and he is older than Mitsuzaki, Toto refers to her as his older sister. Mitsuzaki and Toto promised that they would be the ones to kill each other. Due to this, Mitsuzaki saves Toto after he is defeated by Ganta and attempts to revive him so that she may "Shoot him full of holes." She later defends him using her Branch of Sin, a shield, before Hagire kills her. Mitsuzaki is revealed to be 17, one year younger than Toto. Mitsuzaki only appears in the manga.

=== Scar Chain ===
Scar Chain (自由の鎖, Sukā Chein) is a prison gang consisting of Deadmen that opposes Tamaki's corruption and plan to leak the truth to the rest of the world. They believe in each individual's own personal definition of freedom. Ganta later sided with them to help expose the prison. However, only three managed to escape Deadman Wonderland while most of the others were killed off by the Undertakers.

==== Nagi Kengamine ====
Voiced by: Daisuke Ono (Japanese); J. Michael Tatum (English)

Nagi Kengamine (剣ヶ峰 凪, Kengamine Nagi) / Owl is the leader of Scar Chain, possessing the Branch of Sin called Bloodshot Eyes of the Owl (Owl's Eyeball in the Manga and Japanese anime) which allows him to generate blood spheres that detonate with tremendous force. Before he formed Scar Chain, he had a relationship with a female Deadman while in G-Ward. They eventually were parents-to-be before being put into a Carnival Corpse against each other where he pleaded with Tamaki to not let any harm come to her if anything happened to him. Kengamine intentionally lost due to his lover being pregnant at the time. His defeat gave way to his Penalty Game in which he lost his vocal cords. In a show of cruelty, Tamaki went back on his deal with Nagi and had Genkaku kill Nagi's lover so as to punish his dishonesty. This act prompted Nagi to slaughter the Undertakers almost to the last man in a fit of bloody rage. Due to the loss of his vocal cords, Nagi speaks through a voice box. Two years later, he formed Scar Chain with Karako to help reach his own hope of holding his child, whom he believes to be alive on the surface. While recruiting Ganta to his group, Nagi revealed to Ganta that he had the slot machine rigged so that Minatsuki Takami would only have some of her hair cut off in the Penalty Game. Later while being converted into an Undertaker by Genkaku, Nagi is forced to accept that his child had actually died the day his wife was, preserved with other Deadmen body parts as a valuable specimen due to being the offspring of two Deadmen. Acknowledging his hope of seeing his child again as a mere delusion that kept him sane, Nagi loses his mind and goes on a bloody rampage, killing friend and foe alike until Ganta and Karako snap him out of his despair prior to him being mortally wounded by a disappointed Genkaku. However, helping Ganta defeat Genkaku, Nagi gives Ganta his candy before dying.

==== Karako Koshio ====
Voiced by: Kumiko Itō (Japanese); Jamie Marchi (English)

Karako Koshio (興緒 唐子, Koshio Karako) / Gamefowl is the second-in-command of Scar Chain who is secretly in love with Nagi and fights for his sake. She originally worked as a nurse at a hospital. At some point, Karako ended up in Deadman Wonderland. She is able to use her Branch of Sin called Fists of Blood to coat part of or all of her body in blood, reinforcing her natural strength and durability. While Ganta stays behind to protect her friends, Karako escapes with what remained of Scar Chain from Deadman Wonderland after Nagi's death with her attempt to expose Deadman Wonderland with footage of the Deadmen worsening matters for those still trapped there. She later returns with Makina to help destroy/suppress the Wretched Egg.

==== Bundō Rokuro ====
Voiced by: Jun Fukuyama (Japanese); David Trosko (English)

Bundō Rokuro (六路 文堂, Rokuro Bundō) is a chief of intelligence of Scar Chain and also a Deadman, Rokuro was actually a spy and double agent for Tamaki and the Undertakers whose unnamed Branch of Sin enables him to make a blood shield. Rokuro has an apathetic personality with a manic demeanor bordering on psychosis that draws from his obsession of predicting the probability of different outcomes of courses of events that earned him the moniker "human calculator". Also skilled in digital manipulation, Rokuro was the one who helped Tamaki frame Ganta at his trial by faking a video of Ganta confessing the massacre. Though Rokuro revealed his betrayal during Scar Chain's plan to escape Deadman Wonderland, his attempts to kill the group with a bomb disguised as a data chip failed. When Gazuchi Mōzuri and Shinagaw Dōkoku are slain by Senji Kiyomasa before they can kill Ganta, he is forced to reveal what he knew about the Undertakers' location. After Deadman Wonderland closes, Rokuro was among the prisoners that were transferred to another prison.

==== Kosugi ====
Voiced by: Masaaki Itatori (Japanese); Newton Pittman (English)

Kosugi is a Deadman who is a member of Scar Chain and is the group's bartender. In the anime, he has a prosthetic right arm which contains a hidden knife. In the manga, he fought with a sharp metal bar. Kosuji fights an Undertaker soldier which ends in a mutual kill.

==== Kōmoto ====
Voiced by: Takao Mizuno (Japanese); Chris Cason (English)

Kōmoto is a Deadman in a black hat who is a member of Scar Chain. In the anime, he sports a prosthetic left leg. Kōmoto was killed by the Necro Macro robot (partly from this model having acidic fluid and partly from it crushing Kōmoto).

==== Miya ====
Voiced by: Saeko Zōgō (Japanese); Kelly McHalen (English)

Miya is a Deadman who is a member of Scar Chain. Her unnamed Branch of Sin enables her to fire circles of blood. In the anime, she was named Harumi. Miya is decapitated by an Undertaker soldier and Genkaku hangs her head on his Buddha statue.

==== Wakabayashi ====
Voiced by: Shohei Kajikawa (Japanese); Austin Tindle (English)

Wakabayashi is a paraplegic Deadman who is a member of Scar Chain. He resides in a wheelchair after losing his left leg. During the second fight with the Undertakers, Wakabayashi was among those killed by Genkaku.

==== Ueshima ====
Voiced by: Masayoshi Sugawara (Japanese); Scott Freeman (English)

Ueshima is a Deadman who is a member of Scar Chain. His unnamed Branch of Sin enables him to fire bear traps made of blood. In the manga, Ueshima was killed by the Undertaker soldiers. In the anime, he was killed by Genkaku's gunfire before he can attack with his Branch of Sin.

==== Miyako ====
Voiced by: Kaoru Katakai (Japanese); Juli Erickson (English)

Miyako is a short elderly Deadman who is a member of Scar Chain. When Scar Chain was planning on finding possible recruits after the first breakout attempt fails, Miyako was the one who suggested that they recruit the Deadman with the codename "Albatross" only for Karako to mention that he is too old. Following Genkaku's defeat, Miyako's fate was not shown as she was not seen amongst Genkaku's victims or escaping with the surviving members of Scar Chain.

==== Kazu ====
Voiced by: Ben Charlson

Kazu is mouth mask-wearing Deadman who is a member of Scar Chain. He was burned to death by the flamethrowers used by the Undertaker soldiers. It was this fire that Shiro threw the data chip rigged to explode into.

==== Fujiyoshi ====
Voiced by: David Goodwin

Fujiyoshi is a Deadman who is a member of Scar Chain. In the anime, he was named Matayoshi. He was killed by Genkaku's fire and Genkaku hangs his head on his Buddha statue.

==== Endō ====
Voiced by: Kozo Dozaka (Japanese); Christopher Sabat (English)

Endō is a Deadman who is a member of Scar Chain. His unnamed Branch of Sin enables him to throw spears made of blood. When Scar Chain was planning on finding possible recruits after the first breakout attempt fails, Endō was the one who suggested that they recruit the Deadman with the codename "Kingfisher" only for Karako to reveal that he died in the last Penalty Game. All Endō can comment is that "Kingfisher" was good man. Endō was among the surviving Scar Chain members that escaped from Deadman Wonderland.

==== Ohara ====
Voiced by: Ayumi Yonemaru (Japanese); Terri Doty (English)

Ohara is a Deadman who is a member of Scar Chain. She was among the surviving Scar Chain members that escapes from Deadman Wonderland.

==== Yamazaki ====
Voiced by: Kazutomi Yamamoto (Japanese); Josh Grelle (English)

Yamazaki is a Deadman who is a member of Scar Chain. His unnamed Branch of Sin enables him to create a net made of blood that he can attach to anything. In the manga, Yamazaki is killed by Genkaku who blows off his limbs with his machine guns. In the anime rather than rescuing Karako, he and the other members attempt to escape to the surface. He is shown lying dead amongst a pile of Undertakers on the outskirts of G Wing.

==== Akiyama ====
Voiced by: Charlie Campbell

Akiyama is a Deadman of African origin who is a member of Scar Chain. In the manga, he was among the surviving Scar Chain members that escapes from Deadman Wonderland. In the anime, Akiyama was gunned down by the Undertaker soldiers.

==== Ōshima ====
Voiced by: Linda Leonard

Ōshima is a large middle-age Deadman who is a member of Scar Chain. She uses steel bats in battle and was seen using them to take down some Undertaker soldiers. In the manga, Ōshima was killed upon getting caught in the crossfire. In the anime, Ōshima was found lying dead on the bodies of the Undertaker soldiers.

=== Undertakers ===
The Undertakers (墓守, Andāteikā) (AKA Anti-Deadmen Corps) are Tsunenaga Tamaki's special law enforcement group, his personal secret police composed of some of the worst criminals in Deadman Wonderland that are beyond redemption and are conditioned to become "Anti-Deadmen" with any compassion and morality purged from their minds. The Undertakers possess technology called Worm Eater (which was invented by Tsunenaga Tamaki) that allows them to nullify a Deadman's Branch of Sin ability such that any blood constructs created by Deadmen will revert to normal blood upon contact with their weapons and armor. After Karako and what remained of Scar Chain escaped with some of the Worm Eater technology along with Genkaku slaughtering most of the Undertakers before his defeat at the hands of Ganta, Tamaki replaced the Undertakers with the Forgeries.

==== Azuma Genkaku ====
Voiced by: Toshiyuki Morikawa (Japanese); Jason Douglas (English)

Azuma Genkaku (東 弦角, Genkaku Azuma) is the leader of the 1st Undertaker Platoon, a self-proclaimed "Super Monk" (Uber Monk in English dub) who wields an electric guitar that can split into two machine guns. Before arriving to Deadman Wonderland, Genkaku lived at Buddhist Temple where he suffered various forms of severe physical and sexual abuse from other monks-in-training (including being repeatedly gang-raped), slaughtering his tormentors during the earthquake's aftermath after reaching the conclusion that salvation is in death, he then fashioned a macabre statue of Buddha from their bodies as a symbol of his new belief. Two years before the main storyline, Genkaku murdered Nagi's wife on Tamaki's orders, developing an interest in Nagi after he slaughtered his twenty-two subordinates soon after he killed Nagi's wife. Though getting Nagi into becoming a mindless monster, Genkaku is mortified of his work undone and proceeds to slaughter all his men before eventually being hit by Ganta's Ganbare Gun with the help of Nagi, ending up in a critical comatose state. At Ganta's retrial, it is revealed that Genkaku is still in a coma and in critical condition.

==== Gazuchi Mōzuri ====
Voiced by: Paul Giovanni Ramirez

Gazuchi Mōzuri (Mōzuri Gazuchi) is the leader of the 2nd Undertaker Platoon, a wild man abandoned by his mother and raised by bears. During his time in the woods, he befriended Shinagawa Dōkoku who assisted Gazuchi in the killings before they were caught. He and Shinagawa were sentenced to Deadman Wonderland for the murder of several hunters and campers at age ten. Tamaki enlisted both of them to be in the Undertakers. In the end when sent to Scar Chain's base to hold the group hostage, Gazuchi was easily disemboweled by Senji when he was about to kill Ganta.

==== Shinagawa Dōkoku ====
Voiced by: Scott Freeman

Shinagawa Dōkoku (Dōkoku Shinagawa) is a snake-like serial killer who was Gazuchi's second-in-command. They formed a mutual partnership in their earlier life when he skinned women to make dresses from their hair and scalps while aiding Gazuchi in his killing. They were eventually caught and sentenced to Deadman Wonderland where Tamaki ended up enlisting them to be in the Undertakers. In the end when sent to Scar Chain's base to hold the group hostage, Shinagawa was easily disemboweled by Senji when he and Gazuchi were about to kill Ganta.

==== Hibana Daida ====
Voiced by: Natsumi Takamori (Japanese); Tia Ballard (English)

Hibana Daida (橙 火花, Daida Hibana) is the leader of the 3rd Undertaker Platoon, a seemingly polite and well-mannered young girl who was warped by the abuse heaped upon her by her mother, such as suspending her in the air with hooks embedded in her skin and making her solve complex math problems or problems dealing with theoretical physics, for minor things such as bed wetting and vomiting as a form of behavior modification. However, it turned Hibana into a psychopath who punishes bad people via inhuman torture. She ended up in Deadman Wonderland after she tortured and dismembered several boys in her kindergarten class for flipping her skirt, burying them in a shallow grave in the school's garden. It is later discovered that her mother had been dead for some time before the incident, having hanged herself and that Hibana was keeping her alive in her mind. Despite her diminutive size, she is absurdly strong and wields a massive, sectioned sword longer than she is tall. Though she aided Genkaku in his plans, Hibana became disturbed by his methods and ran away as he turns on her and their men. However, Hibana meets her end when killed by Toto as he used his newly gained Crow Claws to slice her in self-defense.

==== Undertaker Foot Soldiers ====
The Undertaker Foot Soldiers are the full-armored foot soldier of the Undertakers armed with anti-Deadman mundane weaponry such as blades and firearms. The foot soldiers of the Undertakers are shown to be not only murderous, but completely immoral as shown when they attempted to gang-rape Shiro and Karako when they were both captured by Azuma Genkaku. Most of the Undertaker Foot Soldiers were killed by either members of Scar Chain or killed when Azumu Genkaku opened fire on them.

=== Forgeries ===
The Forgeries are artificial Deadman that were created by Tsunenaga Tamaki in order to inspire fear in the people outside of Deadman Wonderland as well as defeating the Wretched Egg. At the time, Deadman Wonderland's Carnival Corpse was seen as inhumane. But by putting his Forgeries into the ring, Tamaki starts to convince people that Deadmen are monsters that deserve to be treated the way they currently are if not worse. All Forgeries wear special masks that keep them hypnotized in a state of euphoria, allowing them to withstand even the most grievous injuries or obey the most irrational orders without a thought. Tamaki's Forgery project was funded by Major Aohi and Tamaki was assisted in their creation by Rei Takashima. These man-made Deadmen have the unique ability to create large snake-like tendrils out of their blood, to be forced out of their arms where they receive this ability with a special poison called Snake. Any bodily contact with the snakes will cause one's muscles to swell up to the point where, if touched or left for a long period of time, they will burst. It has been seen that the swelling can be cut off at early stages, thus preventing more fatal injuries. It is unclear how Tamaki gave them powers without Deadman Worms. The most likely theory is that he studied what the Deadman Worms did to the human body and copied it. When Deadman Wonderland was exposed and shut down, the bodies of the Forgeries were confiscated by the Japanese government to be buried. Due to the anime stopping production before the Revolt Arc, the Forgeries only appeared in the manga.

==== Complete Forgeries ====
The Complete Forgeries are Forgeries who have poison that has evolved. They are supposed to be stronger than even the Deadmen. They are eventually defeated by Ganta, Senji, Minatsuki, Chaplin, and Hitara.

===== Shishito Madoka =====
Shishito Madoka is the leader of the Forgeries' First Unit and is the strongest of the Complete Forgeries. His father had died in the Great Tokyo earthquake and he was severely bullied as a child. It was at that time that he decided that he should be unhappy to make others happy. It is unknown why he was sent to Deadman Wonderland since he didn't have a Branch of Sin to begin with. When he became a Complete Forgery, Shishito gained the Jūshin Shinjū ability which enables his blood to become claws where its poison affects his opponent's senses. Shishito first appeared where he pretended to be shy upon encountering Ganta while hiding his intent to torture and kill him. When Madoka discovers Shiro's life means more to Ganta than his own, he decides to torture Shiro in an iron maiden. Fortunately, Ganta and Shiro are able to defeat him in a combined attack.

===== Ikazuchi Akatsuki =====
Voiced by: Kenji Hamada (Japanese); Bill Jenkins (English)

Ikazuchi Akatsuki is a Complete Forgery who was formerly assigned to the First Unit. He didn't appear in the anime, but he was in the OVA. After the Great Tokyo earthquake, Ikazuchi wandered the ruins of Tokyo and joined the thugs into committing vandalism, rape, and so on. He later had a run in with Senji Kiyomasa (who was still a police officer at the time). Ikazuchi gathered the other criminals and challenged him to a fight. Sometime later, Ikazuchi was apprehended and incarcerated in Deadman Wonderland where Tamaki chose him to be one of his First Unit Forgeries. His Rari Ranshin ability enables him to form a scorpion-like tail from his blood where anyone injected with it gets affected by a poison that is similar to doping. Ikazuchi was later killed by Senji.

===== Azami Midō =====
Azami Midō (御堂 アザミ, Midō Azami) is a resident of C-Ward. Azami Midō is one of the first inmates that Ganta meets and later becomes a friend of Ganta. She owns a pet armadillo named Kincho. Although she came off as rude in her first appearance, she was still very kind when she gave Ganta half of her sandwich after teaching him about Cast Points, scolding him because he didn't read the rule book. There are times when she can be meek, but she seems quick to anger if one pushes the right buttons. After Azami met Ganta, Makina used her as a spy upon snooping through Tamaki's stuff. During her mission in G-Ward, she became a Forgery and is forced to fight as Tamaki bids. Azami was first seen as a Forgery killing an unnamed Deadman in the Carnival Corpse with her Snake ability. Ganta manages to help Azami regain her mentality that the poison masks stole from her. After a battle with Madoka, she stays behind with Shiro while Ganta goes on ahead. However, Hagire (in possession of Toto's body) decapitates Azami when she refuses to help him and Wretched Egg find Ganta. Following Azami's death, Kincho ends up in Yō Takami's custody.

===== Ichi and Hajime Mikawa =====
Ichi and Hajime Mikawa are identical twins in the Complete Forgeries that are members of the First Unit and are also known as Snake Eyes. They appear to be children, but are actually adults trapped in children bodies. In their early life, Ichi and Hajime killed people who brought them food. When they were apprehended, they told the court that they did nothing wrong. Upon Ichi and Hajime being remanded to Deadman Wonderland, Tamaki selected them to become Complete Forgeries. Their Sōrin Musō ability enables them to form screws from their blood that affect anyone hit with them with a sleeping poison. Ichi and Hajime faced off against Idaki Hitara. At first, it looked like Idaki was being overwhelmed by Ichi and Hajime's powers. It turned out that Idaki was spreading his blood around the area which he used to kill them with his "Condor Candle" move.

===== Uzume Sumeragi =====
Uzume Sumeragi is a Complete Forgery in the First Unit. It wasn't revealed why she was sent to Deadman Wonderland. When Uzume became a Complete Forgery, she gained the butterfly-themed Nanairo Chōchō ability that enables anyone hit by it to be affected by a hallucinative poison. She first appears together with Ikazuchi Akatsuki and Ichi and Hajime Mikawa where they were charged with the duty of stopping Ganta from getting to the controlling device. She was about to attack Ganta when they were all stopped by Minatsuki's Whip Wing. Chaplin and Senji also appear. Ganta eventually leaves the Forgeries to them and leaves. Uzume is attacked by Minatsuki Takami and Chaplin Sukegawa. Uzume demonstrated the ability to use her poison that caused Minatsuki and Chaplin to hallucinate. Minatsuki and Chaplin managed to overcome the poison and defeat her. Uzume is then shown unconscious and heavily wounded (Minatsuki commented that her face became ugly), but it appears that she survived unlike the other forgeries.

== Other characters ==
=== Domon ===
Voiced by: Unshō Ishizuka (Japanese); Kent Williams (English)

Appearing in the OVA, Domon is a police officer that Senji Kiyomasu worked for following the Great Tokyo earthquake. He was killed in battle against Ikazuchi Akatsuki.

=== Sorae Igarashi ===
Sorae Igarashi is a cold and callous doctor who is Ganta's mother, having intentionally conceived him for human experimentation to create the first Deadman. But her maternal instincts caused her to replace the newborn with another baby, Shiro. While she despised herself for the horrific things she and Hagire put Shiro through while developing the Mother Goose system to keep Shiro's bloodlust in check, she was a loving mother towards both her son and Shiro. Sorae eventually shot herself in the head when she could no longer bear the guilt of turning Shiro into a monster and unable to end the girl's life, but developed the means to kill Shiro which end up in Ganta's possession. In the anime, Ganta explains that his mother had died ten years before going into Deadman Wonderland.

=== Major Aohi ===
Voiced by: Hiroto Kazuki (Japanese); Greg Dulcie (English)

Major Aohi is in the National Defense Ministry. He was Tsunenaga Tamaki's silent partner in his creation of the Forgeries. Major Aohi first appears in the Scar Chain arc where he arrives to inspect Deadman Wonderland. While the other inspectors are going through Deadman Wonderland, Major Aohi met with Tamaki to discuss about the Forgeries. Tamaki gives Aohi feedback about the manufacture saying they're in the middle of researching the Nameless Worm. Aohi tells him he doesn't want uncontrollable soldiers to which Tamaki replies that he can't back down now. Aohi concludes by saying that the budget stays the same. Sometime after Deadman Wonderland was shut down, Major Aohi allowed Makina to use his submarine Walfisch in exchange that she doesn't tell his superiors about his cooperation with Tamaki.

=== Keigo Ugachi ===
Voiced by: Kishō Taniyama (Japanese); Jerry Jewell (English)

Keigo Ugachi is an OVA-exclusive character and the former leader of Goreless Peace. He tries to get Senji Kiyomasa to join his gang (Goreless Peace), but Senji refuses. Keigo is infuriated by this and commences an attack on Senji's friends, killing Izuru and Hinata. Senji then goes after him and eventually is trapped in his Branch of Sin. Senji attempted to get free, only to be caught once again. Domon then entered to assist Senji, but Keigo trapped him as well, wounded him critically in the process. Angered by this, Senji manages to extend his Crow Claw and stabs Keigo through the chest. Keigo tells Senji to finish him off, which Senji is glad to comply with, however Domon interrupts, telling Senji that he cannot kill Keigo as then he'd be no better than him. Senji raises his Crow Claw to bring down on Keigo, but stops at the last second as he notices Keigo fearfully flinch. Senji passes out and Keigo is arrested.

=== Ekō Kaidō ===
Ekō Kaidō is an ex-Defense Force soldier who was an acquaintance to Makina. He now works as a journalist which helps Makina overthrow Tsunenaga Tamaki and expose Deadman Wonderland. Ekō Kaidō only appeared in the manga.

=== Kashima Toraichi ===
Kashima Toraichi is an ex-Defense Force soldier who was an acquaintance to Makina. He helped Makina overthrow Tsunenaga Tamaki and expose Deadman Wonderland. Kashima Toraichi only appeared in the manga.

=== Bonbu ===
Bonbu is an ex-Defense Force soldier who was an acquaintance to Makina. He helped Makina overthrow Tsunenaga Tamaki and expose Deadman Wonderland. Bonbu only appeared in the manga.
