= Fade (band) =

Japanese-American rock band

- Origin: Tokyo, Japan (Fade); New York City, New York, U.S. (pre-Fade)
- Genres: Alternative rock; hard rock; post-grunge; pop rock; instrumental rock (Note: Pre-Fade years.)
- Years active: 1999–2014 (Pre-Fade: 1991–1999)
- Labels: Universal Music Japan (2002–2014)
- Past members: Kansei Miyagi; Rui Watanabe; Noriyuki Hashimoto; Godo; Jon Underdown

Fade (stylized as fade) was a Japanese-American rock band formed in 1991. Fade released five mini-albums, two full-length studio albums, and two singles. On April 9, 2014, Fade announced an indefinite hiatus, in effect after the completion of their June tour. They were with Universal Music Japan for their final 12 years.

== History ==
=== Pre-Fade and Formation (1991–2002) ===
the band's roots began in 1991 with an instrumental band formed by drummer Rui Watanabe and guitarist Kansei Miyagi, both of whom attended the same Japanese secondary school in New York City. After several bassist changes in the band's early years, Noriyuki Hashimoto joined the group in 1994. In 1999 the members relocated to Tokyo, Japan to form a new band, there they met guitarist Shingo Terasawa (alias 5°, pronounced Godo) who became the band's second guitarist. In 2001, vocalist Jon Underdown, who at the time was an exchange student from Seattle, Washington, joined the band solidifying the line-up. The following year, 2002, the group officially decided on the band name Fade. Jon, Rui and Kansei were born in the United States but only Jon is without Japanese ancestry, while Noriyuki and Godo were born in Japan.

=== Fade and A Moment of Truth (2003–2005) ===
The band's debut mini-album, Fade, was released nationwide in Japan in 2003. It ranked third on Japan Countdown, a weekly countdown chart of album sales nationwide in Japan. Following their debut mini-album, while working with Markku Lappalainen (ex. Hoobastank), Erik Gregory (programming for Linkin Park’s first remix album Reanimation), and Jason C. Miller (gODHEAD) in 2005, Fade released their second mini-album entitled A Moment of Truth. “Beautiful”, the album's third track, was featured in the 2006 Shunji Iwai film, Rainbow Song.

=== Under the Sun and To Find A Better Tomorrow (2005–2008) ===
A Moment of Truth was shortly followed by the release of Under the Sun, the band's third mini-album, a few months later. The band's fourth mini-album release, To Find A Better Tomorrow, on which they worked with Ted Jensen, was released in 2008 ranking ninth on the Western Music chart of USEN Japan. The album's sixth track, “Slitting Regret”, features additional vocals from Toyo of Japanese industrial metal band Newbreed.

=== Age of Innocence and Kings of Dawn (2009–2011) ===
2009 marked Fade's fifth release and first full-length studio album, Age of Innocence. It included songs that were featured on numerous marketing campaigns including ABC-Mart, and popular video games series' Drum Mania and Guitar Freaks.

Concurrently, the singles "One Reason" and "Cosmicalism" (コズミカリズム, Kozumikarizumu) were also released in April 2011. The song "One Reason" by Fade featuring Deadman Wonder Band (DWB), was the opening theme song to the Japanese anime Deadman Wonderland. A limited edition of "One Reason" was also released in 2011, which included a bonus DVD of Deadman Wonderland. The song "One Reason" ranked fourth on the Independent Label music chart.

Fade's sixth release, Kings of Dawn, arrived in 2011, which featured Koie Kenta, of Japanese industrial metal band Crossfaith, on the intro track "Born Ready". This was also the first album featuring Jon singing in Japanese in addition to being the first album which the band hired producer, Hajime Okano (L'Arc-en-Ciel). An iTunes version of Kings of Dawn was released which included a cover of Bon Jovi's "Livin' on a Prayer" (1986). In addition, a European edition of Kings of Dawn was also released in December 2011 through Gan-shin Records.

"In the End" by the band is the theme song for the Japanese version of the film Shark Night.

=== Ten and Crossroad: History of Fade (2012–2014) ===
Ten (天; lit. "Heaven"), the band's seventh album (second full-length) was released in July 2012. The band once again collaborated with producer Hajime Okano, and featured Toyo from Newbreed on the album's second track, "Chase for Daylight", Jon once described the concept of TEN as “ROCK with pop sensibility” and commented “I think we went to the poppyest we’ve ever been on one side, and we went to the heaviest we’ve ever been, too”. A limited-edition of TEN was also released which included a bonus DVD featuring selected live concert footage and music videos.

The band's eighth album, Crossroad: History of Fade, released on 26 February 2014, features seventeen tracks of which three are new. The band worked with Akira Yamaoka on the new track "One Shot Dealer". Mixing for the album was done in L.A. by Jay Baumgardner.

=== Hiatus (2014-present) ===
On April 9, 2014, fade announced an indefinite hiatus, in effect after the completion of their June tour.

Since their hiatus, the band members are still in the spotlight to some extent. The vocalist Jon is co-founder of 'Funtime Productions' with Victor Newman, a music production company. Jon also still contributes his vocals to various games and soundtracks in Japan. The drummer Rui continues to work as a music producer for various artists such as Reona, as well as becoming a Twitch streamer and occasionally reminiscing about his times in Fade. And guitarist Godo has now devoted his time to painting, as well as occasionally continuing his work as a musician, being a guitar support artist and posting his own solo acoustic works, more notably on SoundCloud.

== Discography ==
=== Mini-album ===
- Fade (January 8, 2003)
- A Moment of Truth (March 23, 2005)
- Under the Sun (July 27, 2005)
- To Find A Better Tomorrow (August 6, 2008)
- Kings of Dawn (April 4, 2011)

=== Studio albums ===
- Age Of Innocence (November 11, 2009)
- Ten (June 6, 2012)

=== Compilation albums ===
- Crossroad: History of Fade (February 26, 2014)

=== Singles ===
- Black Hearts & Dollar Signs (2009)
- One Reason (2011)
- Cosmicalism (2011)
- Cross Road (EN) (2013)
- Cross Road (JP) (2013)

== Band members ==
Former members

- Kansei Miyagi − guitars, backing vocals (1991–2014)
- Rui Watanabe − drums, bandleader (1991–2014)
- Noriyuki Hashimoto − bass, backing vocals (1994–2014)
- Shingo "Godo" Terasawa − guitars, backing vocals (1999–2014)
- Jonathan Matthew "Jon" Underdown − lead vocals (2001–2014)
