= Funkist =

Japanese rock band formed in 2001

FUNKIST
- Origin: Japan
- Genre: Rock
- Years active: 2001 – present
- Label: Pony Canyon (2008–2012)
- Members: Saigō Someya (vocal); Taiji Miyata (guitar); Yoshirō (guitar); Jotaro (bass); Ogachi (percussion)
- Past members: Yōko Kasugai (flute); Jūshaku (drums)
- Website: funkist.info

Funkist, stylized as FUNKIST, is a Japanese rock band signed to the Powerplay label. The band is best known for performing two opening theme songs, "Snow Fairy" and "Ft.", for the anime series Fairy Tail.

== History ==
Funkist was formed in 2001 as a trio consisting of vocalist Saigo Someya, guitarist Miyata Taiji, and guitarist Yoshiro.

In 2005, Funkist toured Tokyo, Okinawa, and Macau.

In 2006, the band held multiple major live tours, including a tour in South Africa and another covering all 47 prefectures of Japan.

In 2007, the single "White World" reached number one on the Tower Records Shibuya J-INDIES chart for two consecutive weeks, and ranked 14th on the Oricon Indie chart. That year, they also toured China and Macau, and performed at Shibuya O-East.

In 2008, Funkist performed at Shibuya-AX. In May, they participated in the Global Article 9 Conference to Abolish War held in Tokyo. In July, they signed with Pony Canyon. As a model for the item, "Artist" in the "Images Ashinaru" Images site offers live photos.

In the same year, Funkist released the single "All Together," which gained prominence as the theme song for the "All-Star Charity Pro Wrestling" event supporting the Tohoku earthquake relief efforts.

On October 13, 2011, at 12:17 p.m., the band's flutist, Yōko Kasugai, died at the age of 35 while recuperating from an illness.

== Members ==
=== Current members ===
- Saigō Someya (染谷西郷) – lead vocals (2001–present)
- Miyata Taiji (宮田泰治) – guitar (2001–present)
- Yoshirō (ヨシロウ) – guitar (2001–present)
- Jotaro (ジョウタロウ) – bass guitar (2001–present)
- Ogachi (オガチ) – percussion (2001–present)

=== Former members ===
- Jūshaku (住職) – drums, percussion (2001–2023)
- Yōko Kasugai (春日井陽子) – flute (2001–2009; died 2011)

== Discography ==
=== Indie releases ===
==== Singles ====
1. Okinawa (沖縄)
  1. Okinawa (沖縄)
  2. Rasta in the Moonlight (月下のラスタカラー)
  3. Smirk (つくり笑い)
  4. 〜Border〜
2. Japarikan Soul (ジャパリカンSOUL) – January 16, 2006
  1. Japarikan Soul (ジャパリカンSOUL)
  2. The Spring Dance Season
  3. Earth House
  4. Baby Cool
3. White World — February 7, 2007
  1. White world
  2. Winter skier
4. The Love Song
  1. The Love Song
  2. Blue breeze
  3. SOS (※ Live ver.)
  4. Light (※ Live ver.)

==== Albums ====
1. Thankist
2. Resort
3. Record Prayer – December 19, 2007

=== Major releases ===
==== Singles ====
1. My Girl – July 16, 2008
2. White World (Live at Shibuya-AX) — April 29, 2008
3. Border — December 3, 2008 (TBS CDTV opening theme for December)
4. Moonrise Carnival — September 2, 2009
5. Snow Fairy — December 2, 2009 (Opening theme for TV Tokyo anime Fairy Tail)
6. Mama Africa" — March 10, 2010 (Puma "Africa Celebration" theme song)
7. Rising Hope — 2010
8. Ft. / Peace Ball — April 28, 2010
9. All Together — August 24, 2011 (Official theme song for the "All Together" charity wrestling event)
10. Shine — February 22, 2012 (Opening theme for PSP game Tales of the Heroes: Twin Brave)

==== Albums ====
1. Sunrise 7 — February 18, 2009
2. Funkist Cup — June 16, 2010
3. 7 — April 11, 2012

=== Major mini-albums ===
1. Pieceful — February 2, 2011

=== Live albums ===
1. Dawn Dawn Dawn Dawn Dodon Welcome to Japan (Live tour 2010–2011 limited edition) — May 8, 2011
2. Live Venue Limited Edition Funkist Live: Revolution Tour 2011 — October 29, 2011
3. Live Venue Limited Edition Funkist Live Tour 2011 "Collavolution Tour 2011" — April 21, 2012

=== DVD ===
1. Colors
2. The Thank You Tour to South Africa

=== Notes ===
Some releases, such as "Song of Love," "Brave," "New Days," and "Only Waiting for Your Call," are tied to media collaborations, including TV dramas and games.

Several live albums include recordings from specific venues and dates, noted in their track listings.

== Tie-up list ==
1. "Border" – CDTV opening theme song for December 2008 (TBS network)
2. "Snow Fairy" – first opening theme song for the anime series Fairy Tail (TV Tokyo)
3. "Mama Africa" – theme song for Puma's "Africa Celebration" campaign
4. "Ft." – third opening theme song for the anime series Fairy Tail (TV Tokyo)
5. "Peace Ball" – ending theme for Super Soccer (TBS network)
6. "All Together" – official theme song for the "All Together" charity pro wrestling event supporting Tohoku earthquake relief efforts
7. "Shine" – opening theme for the PSP game Tales of the Heroes: Twin Brave
8. "New Days" – ending theme for the PSP game Tales of the Heroes: Twin Brave
9. "Brave" – insert song for the PSP game Tales of the Heroes: Twin Brave

=== Radio ===
1. Lucky 7 to Even Funkist Radio-time – aired every Thursday from 25:40 to 26:00 as part of Strobe Night! on FM Nack5
