= Newton Pittman =

American voice actor

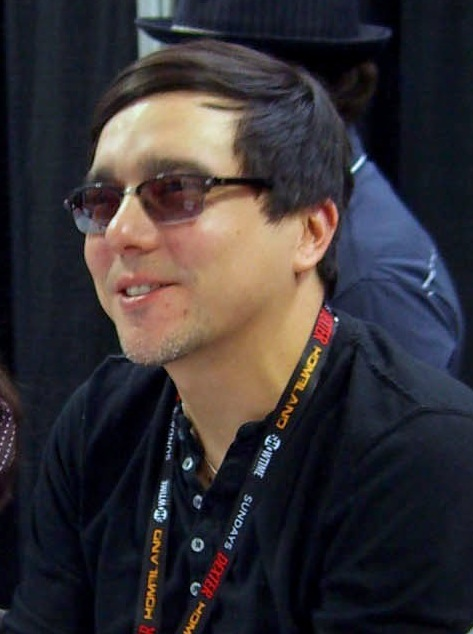
- Pittman at the New York Comic Con in 2011
- Born: Newton Brandburn Pittman; August 29, 1976 (age 50); Maspeth, Queens, New York
- Other name: Paul Stevenz
- Occupation: Voice actor
- Years active: 2004–present
- Agent: Mary Collins Agency
- Notable credits: Fairy Tail as Gray Fullbuster; My Hero Academia as Jin Bubaigawara

Newton Brandburn Pittman (born August 29, 1976) is an American voice actor working for Funimation, best known for playing Gray Fullbuster in Fairy Tail, Zwei in Phantom: Requiem for the Phantom, and Panties in Eden of the East. Pittman lived in New York City for eight years, before returning to the Dallas-Fort Worth Metroplex area.

== Filmography ==
=== Films ===
Year	Title	Role	Notes
2009	Evangelion: 2.0 You Can (Not) Advance	Additional Voices (voice)	
2009	Tales of Vesperia: The First Strike	Chris (English version, voice)	
2009	Eden of the East the Movie 1: The King of Eden	Yutaka 'Panties' Itazu (English version, voice)	
2010	Eden of the East the Movie 2: Paradise Lost	Yutaka 'Panties' Itazu (English version, voice)	
2010	Trigun: Badlands Rumble	Mechio (English version, voice)	
2010	Hetalia: Axis Powers - Paint It, White!	Additional Voices (English version, voice)	
2011	Fullmetal Alchemist: The Sacred Star of Milos	Additional Voices (English version, voice)	
2012	Fairy Tail the Movie: Phoenix Priestess	Gray Fullbuster (English version, voice)	
2013	A Certain Magical Index: The Movie – The Miracle of Endymion	Motoharu Tsuchimikado (English version, voice)	
2014	Black Butler	Aoki Munemitsu (English version, voice)	
2014	Rurouni Kenshin: The Legend Ends	Police Officer (English version, voice)	
2015	Maid	Officer Two	Short
2017	Fairy Tail: Dragon Cry	Gray Fullbuster (English version, voice)	

=== Television ===
Year	Title	Role	Notes
2004	Initial D	Additional Voices (English version, voice)	Guest role (4 episode)
2004–2005	Sgt. Frog	Additional Voices (English version, voice)	Guest role (10 episodes)
2007	Oh! Edo Rocket	Heels (English version, voice)	Recurring role (20 episodes)
2007–2008	Hero Tales	Taito Shirei (English version, voice)	Main role (26 episodes)
2008	Blassreiter	Additional Voices (English version, voice)	Guest role (10 episodes)
2008	Ga-Rei: Zero	Additional Voices (English version, voice)	Episode: "Above Aoi"
2008–2009	Soul Eater	Additional Voices, Arachnophobia Fighter (English version, voice)	Guest role (12 episode)
2008–2009	Birdy the Mighty Decode	Georg Gomez (English version, voice)	Recurring role (9 episodes)
2008; 2018–2019	A Certain Magical Index	Motoharu Tsuchimikado (English version, voice)	Recurring role (15 episodes)
2009	Chrome Shelled Regios	Dinn Dee (English version, voice)	Guest role (3 episodes)
2009	Black Butler	Harold West (English version, voice)	Guest role (2 episodes)
2009	RideBack	Additional Voices (English version, voice)	Guest role (3 episodes)
2009	Eden of the East	Yutaka 'Panties' Itazu (English version, voice)	Guest role (3 episodes)
2009	Phantom: Requiem for the Phantom	Reiji "Zwei" Azuma (English version, voice)	Main role (26 episodes)
2009	To	Additional Voices (English version, voice)	Guest role (2 episodes)
2009–2010	Sengoku Basara	Additional Voices (English version, voice)	Guest role (13 episodes)
2009–2010	Fullmetal Alchemist: Brotherhood	Heath, Additional Voices (English version, voice)	Guest role (8 episodes)
2009–2015; 2018–2019	Fairy Tail	Gray Fullbuster (English version, voice)	Main role (260 episodes)
2010	Shiki	Tsurumi, Additional Voices (English version, voice)	Guest role (2 episodes)
2010	The Good Guys	Tommy	Episode: "Hunches & Heists"
2010	Sekirei	Tanigawa (English version, voice)	Episode: "A Multitude of Bonds"
2010	Okami-san and Her Seven Companions	Additional Voices (English version, voice)	Guest role (4 episodes)
2010	Jerry Bruckheimer's Chase	Fashion Photographer	Episode: "Above the Law"
2010	The Legend of the Legendary Heroes	Lir Orla (English version, voice)	Guest role (3 episodes)
2011	Fractale	Additional Voices (English version, voice)	Guest role (2 episodes)
2011	Level E	Lafferty (English version, voice)	Recurring role (5 episodes)
2011	Deadman Wonderland	Kosugi (English version, voice)	Episode: "Chains of Freedom (Scar Chain)"
2011	C	Takazawa, Additional Voices (English version, voice)	Guest role (5 episodes)
2011	One Piece	Magra (English version, voice)	Guest role (7 episodes)
2011	Fairy Tail	Gray Surge (English version, voice)	Guest role (4 episodes)
2012	Hyouka	Additional Voices (English version, voice)	Guest role (23 episodes)
2013	Attack on Titan	Additional Voices (English version, voice)	Guest role (3 episodes)
2014	D-Frag!	Sou Kameyamagami, Additional Voices (English version, voice)	Guest role (3 episodes)
2014	Soul Eater Not!	Additional Voices (English version, voice)	Guest role (2 episodes)
2014	Space Dandy	Additional Voices, Operator (English version, voice)	Guest role (2 episodes)
2014	Yona of the Dawn	Additional Voices (English version, voice)	Episode: "Shaking Resolve"
2015	Ninja Slayer	Warlock (English version, voice)	Episode: "Born in Red Black"
2015	Seraph of the End	Nagai (English version, voice)	Episode: "Vampire Attack"
2015	Yamada-kun and the Seven Witches	Ryu Yamada (English version, voice)	Main role (12 episodes)
2015	Gangsta	Colt (English version, voice)	Episode: "Absence"
2015	Noragami	Abe (English version, voice)	Episode: "The Sound of a Thread Snapping"
2016	Orange	Additional Voices (English version, voice)	Guest role (2 episodes)
2016	First Love Monster	Arashi Nagasawa (English version, voice)	Recurring role (10 episodes)
2016	Danganronpa 3: The End of Hope's Peak Academy	Additional Voices (English version, voice)	Guest role (11 episodes)
2017	Miss Kobayashi's Dragon Maid	Additional Voices (English version, voice)	Guest role (2 episodes)
2017	Kino's Journey: The Beautiful World - the Animated Series	Bandit Boy (English version, voice)	Episode: "Various Countries"
2017	Blood Blockade Battlefront	Additional Voices (English version, voice)	Guest role (2 episodes)
2018	Hina Festival	Taxi Driver (English version, voice)	Episode: "Three Heads Are Better than One"
2018	Full Metal Panic!	Kaew (English version, voice)	Guest role (3 episodes)
2018	Dances with the Dragons	Remedius (English version, voice)	Guest role (5 episodes)
2018	Overlord	Barbro, Additional Voices (English version, voice)	Guest role (3 episodes)
2018	Hinomaru Sumo	Additional Voices (English version, voice)	Episode: "The Kusanagi Sword"
2018–2022	My Hero Academia	Jin "Twice" Bubaigawara (English version, voice)	Recurring role
2019	Boogiepop and Others	Additional Voices (English version, voice)	Episode: "VS Imaginator 4"
2024-	Fairy Tail 100 Years Quest	Gray Fullbuster (English version, voice)	Main Role

=== Video games ===
Year	Title	Role	Notes
2012	Borderlands 2	Rat (voice)	
