= Fairy Tail (TV series) =

Japanese anime television series

- Genre: Adventure; Fantasy
- Based on: Fairy Tail by Hiro Mashima
- Developed by: Masashi Sogo
- Directed by: Shinji Ishihira
- Voices of: Tetsuya Kakihara; Aya Hirano; Rie Kugimiya; Yuichi Nakamura; Sayaka Ohara; Satomi Satō; Yui Horie
- Music by: Yasuharu Takanashi
- Country of origin: Japan
- Original language: Japanese
- No. of seasons: 3 (Note: Before being folded into Crunchyroll, LLC in March 2022, Funimation had previously listed the series as consisting of 9 seasons. This has since been largely disregarded and replaced with the original 3-season production cycle used back in Japan.)
- No. of episodes: 328 + 9 OVAs (Note: OVA count does not include the bonus extra "The First Morning", (Note: はじまりの朝, Hajimari no Asa) which serves as a promotional tie-in to Fairy Tail the Movie: Phoenix Priestess.) (list of episodes)

Production
- Producers: List: Yoshikazu Beniya (S1–2); Tomonori Ochikoshi (#1–226); Taihei Yamanishi (#1–48); Yōsuke Imai (#49–214); Yōhei Itō (chief; S2–3); Junichirou Tsuchiya (chief; #176–226); Tetsuya Endo (#215–277); Naritoshi Sato (#227–328); Osamu Takesue (#227–328); Aya Yoshino (S3); Akiko Nabeiwa (S3)
- Cinematography: Atsushi Iwasaki (S1/3); Satoru Kuroiwa (S2)
- Animators: A-1 Pictures; Satelight (S1); Bridge (S2–3); CloverWorks (S3)
- Editors: Yūji Oka (S1); Toshio Henmi (S2–3)
- Running time: 24 minutes (S1–2); 23 minutes (S3)
- Production companies: TV Tokyo; Dentsu; A-1 Pictures (S1–2); CloverWorks (S3)

Original release
- Network: TV Tokyo
- Release: October 12, 2009 – September 29, 2019

Related
- Fairy Tail the Movie: Phoenix Priestess (2012); Fairy Tail: Dragon Cry (2017); Fairy Tail: 100 Years Quest (2024–2025)

Fairy Tail is a Japanese anime television series produced by A-1 Pictures, Dentsu, Satelight, Bridge, and CloverWorks. Based on the manga series Fairy Tail by Hiro Mashima, the series aired for 328 episodes on TV Tokyo and its TXN affiliates from October 12, 2009, to September 29, 2019. The series follows the journeys of Natsu Dragneel, Lucy Heartfilia and the wizard (Note: According to the translation notes in the Del Rey edition of the manga's second volume, wizard is the translation of the Japanese word madōshi. However, the meaning of madōshi is similar to certain Japanese words that have been adopted by the English language, such as judo (the soft way) and kendo (the way of the sword). This translation took that as inspiration and translated the word madōshi as wizard. Madō is the way of magic, and madōshi are those who follow the way of magic. Although the word wizard is used, a Japanese reader would likely not think of traditional Western wizards, such as Merlin or Gandalf, but rather of martial artists.) guild, Fairy Tail. A sequel series, titled Fairy Tail: 100 Years Quest, aired from July 2024 to January 2025.

== Plot ==
The world of Earth-land is home to numerous guilds where wizards apply their magic for paid job requests. Natsu Dragneel, a Dragon Slayer wizard from the Fairy Tail guild, explores the Kingdom of Fiore in search of his missing adoptive father, the dragon Igneel. During his journey, he befriends a young celestial wizard named Lucy Heartfilia and invites her to join Fairy Tail. Natsu, Lucy, and the cat-like Exceed Happy form a team, which is gradually joined by other guild members: Gray Fullbuster, an ice wizard; Erza Scarlet, a magical knight; and Wendy Marvell and Carla, another Dragon Slayer and Exceed duo. The team embarks on numerous missions and misadventures, which include subduing criminals, illegal dark guilds, and ancient Etherious demons created by Zeref the Black Wizard.

Natsu and his companions eventually meet Zeref on Fairy Tail's sacred ground of Sirius Island. Cursed with immortality and deadly power for the past 400 years, Zeref wishes to die to atone for his atrocities. A battle over Zeref ensues between Fairy Tail and the dark guild Grimoire Heart, which attracts the attention of the evil black dragon Acnologia. The Fairy Tail wizards survive Acnologia's assault when the spirit of their guild's founder and Zeref's estranged lover, Mavis Vermillion, casts the defensive Fairy Sphere spell that places them into seven years of suspended animation. Following their victory in the Grand Magic Games tournament, Fairy Tail wages war against Tartaros, a dark guild of Etherious who aim to unseal a book believed to contain E.N.D., Zeref's ultimate demon. When Acnologia returns to annihilate both guilds, Igneel emerges from Natsu's body, having sealed himself within him in a bid to defeat Acnologia. However, Acnologia kills Igneel in front of a helpless Natsu, who departs on a training journey to avenge Igneel.

After Natsu returns one year later, Fiore is invaded by the Alvarez Empire, a military nation ruled by Zeref. Disillusioned with the conflicts performed in his name, Zeref decides to rewrite history and prevent his own rise to power; he intends to accomplish this by acquiring Fairy Heart, a wellspring of infinite magic power housed within Mavis's equally cursed body, which is preserved beneath Fairy Tail's guild hall. While battling Zeref, Natsu learns his own identity as both Zeref's younger brother and the true incarnation of E.N.D. (Etherious Natsu Dragneel), whom Zeref resurrected as a demon and sent 400 years through the time travel gate Eclipse in collusion with Igneel, all with the intention of being killed by Natsu. Natsu fails to do so, but manages to incapacitate Zeref to stop the drastic changes his actions would create, allowing Mavis to lift her and Zeref's curse by reciprocating his love, which kills them both.

Meanwhile, Fairy Tail and their allies detain Acnologia within a space-time rift created by the use of Eclipse. However, Acnologia consumes the rift's magic to escape, granting him godlike power, which he maintains by bringing the present Dragon Slayers into the rift with his disembodied spirit. Lucy and many other wizards across the continent immobilize Acnologia's body within Fairy Sphere, while Natsu accumulates the other Dragon Slayers' magic and destroys his spirit, killing Acnologia and freeing the Dragon Slayers. The following year, Natsu and his team depart on a century-old guild mission, continuing their adventures together.

== Voice cast ==
Character	Japanese	English
Natsu Dragneel	Tetsuya Kakihara	Todd Haberkorn; Luci Christian (young)
Lucy Heartfilia	Aya Hirano	Cherami Leigh
Happy	Rie Kugimiya	Tia Ballard
Gray Fullbuster	Yuichi Nakamura	Newton Pittman; Ryan Reynolds (young)
Erza Scarlet	Sayaka Ohara	Colleen Clinkenbeard
Wendy Marvell	Satomi Satō	Brittney Karbowski
Carla	Yui Horie	Jad Saxton
Gajeel Redfox	Wataru Hatano	David Wald
Panther Lily	Hiroki Tochi	Rick Keeling
Makarov Dreyar	Shinpachi Tsuji	R. Bruce Rlliott
Mirajane Strauss	Ryōko Ono	Monica Rial
Elfman Strauss	Hiroki Yasumoto	Christopher Sabat
Lisanna Strauss	Harumi Sakurai	Carrie Savage
Juvia Lockser	Mai Nakahara	Brina Palencia
Levy McGarden	Mariya Ise	Kristi Kang
Cana Alberona	Eri Kitamura	Jamie Marchi
Mavis Vermillion	Mamiko Noto	Leah Clark
Zeref	Akira Ishida	Joel McDonald
Acnologia	Kōsuke Toriumi	J. Michael Tatum

== Production ==
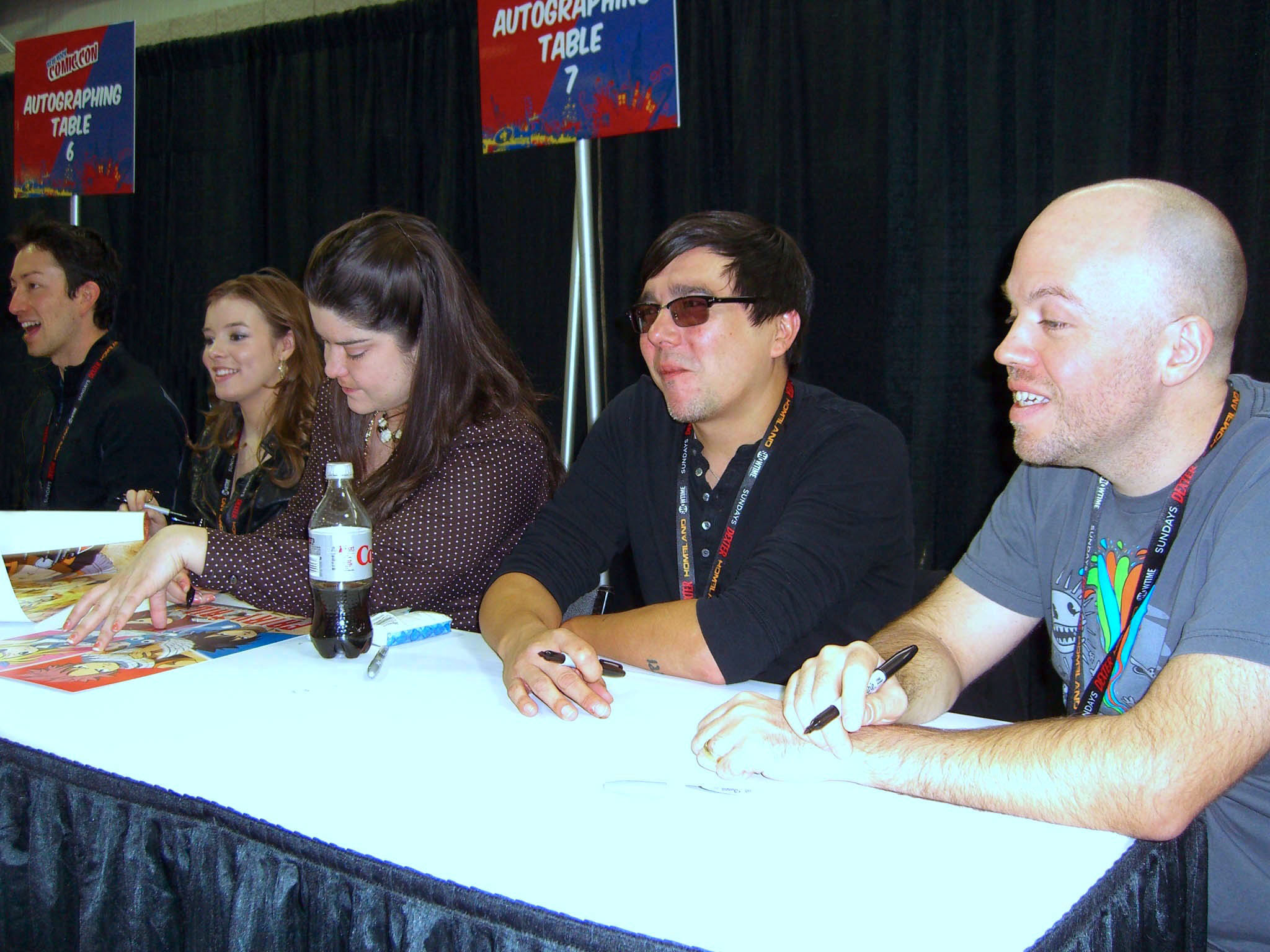
The Funimation staff and voice cast of the anime at the 2011 New York Comic Con, from left to right: Todd Haberkorn (Natsu), Cherami Leigh (Lucy), Colleen Clinkenbeard (Erza), Newton Pittman (Gray), and Tyler Walker (ADR director).

The production of the Fairy Tail anime is notable for its shifts in animation studios across three distinct "Series" cycles. Season 1 (2009–2013): A collaboration between A-1 Pictures and Satelight. This era featured a lighter color palette and the consistent use of "Magic Circles" (Mahōjin) during combat, a visual trope later phased out. Season 2 (2014–2016): Following a hiatus, the show returned as Fairy Tail (2014). Bridge replaced Satelight as the co-animation studio. This run introduced a darker, more saturated color scheme and sharper character designs to better reflect the manga's evolving art style. Final Season (2018–2019): CloverWorks (a former subsidiary of A-1 Pictures) joined the production to finish the series. This era utilized advanced digital lighting and cinematic effects for the final war against the Alvarez Empire.

A-1 Pictures, Dentsu, and Satelight produced the anime adaptation of the manga. The anime, also titled Fairy Tail and directed by Shinji Ishihira, premiered on TV Tokyo on October 12, 2009; it was simulcast on Crunchyroll the following day. The series ended its run on March 30, 2013, with reruns beginning to air on April 4, 2013, under the title Fairy Tail Best!. Forty-one DVD volumes containing four episodes each have been released. The Southeast Asian network Animax Asia aired the series locally in English. On January 18, 2011, British anime distributor Manga Entertainment announced on Twitter that the company would release the anime series in bilingual format at the end of the year. On April 21, 2011, they had confirmed that the first volume with 12 episodes would be released in February 2012; however, they later announced that the first volume would be released on March 5, 2012. In 2011, North American anime distributor Funimation Entertainment announced that they had acquired the first season of the ongoing series. The series made its North American television debut on November 22, 2011, on the Funimation Channel. The anime is also licensed by Madman Entertainment, who streamed and simulcasted the series on AnimeLab in Australia and New Zealand Melanesian Region (Fiji, Papua New Guinea, Solomon Islands and Vanuatu), Polynesian Region (Cook Islands, Niue, Samoa, Tonga, and Tuvalu). Funimation announced that the ninth installment would get the DVD/Blu-ray release on March 25, 2014.

On March 4, 2013, Mashima announced on his Twitter account that the anime would not end yet, and confirmed on July 11 that a sequel series was greenlit. The sequel series was officially confirmed in Weekly Shonen Magazine on December 28, 2013, with a special edition chapter. The sequel is produced by A-1 Pictures and Bridge, featuring character designs by Shinji Takeuchi; the original series' voice actors also returned to the project along with director Shinji Ishihira and writer Masashi Sogo. The official website for the sequel was launched on January 7, 2014. The series premiered on TV Tokyo on April 5, 2014, and was being simulcast by Funimation Entertainment. The second series concluded its run on March 26, 2016.

On March 22, 2016, Mashima announced via Twitter that another Fairy Tail series was being developed. On July 20, 2017, Mashima confirmed on Twitter that the final season of Fairy Tail would air in 2018. The final season of Fairy Tail aired from October 7, 2018, to September 29, 2019. A-1 Pictures, CloverWorks, and Bridge produced and animated the final season, which ran from October 7, 2018, to September 29, 2019. for 51 episodes.

Following Sony's acquisition of Crunchyroll, the dub was moved to the streaming service.

=== Original video animations ===
Nine original video animations (OVAs) of Fairy Tail have been produced and released on DVD by A-1 Pictures and Satelight, each bundled with a limited edition tankōbon volume of the manga. The first OVA, "Welcome to Fairy Hills!!" (Note: ようこそフェアリーヒルズ!!, Yōkoso Fearī Hiruzu) is an adaptation of the manga omake of the same name, and was released with the 26th volume on April 15, 2011. The second, "Fairy Academy: Yankee-kun and Yankee-chan", (Note: 妖精学園 ヤンキー君とヤンキーちゃん, Yōsei Gakuen: Yankī-kun to Yankī-chan) is also an adaptation of the omake of the same name, and was released together with the 27th volume on June 17, 2011. The third, "Memory Days", (Note: メモリーデイズ, Memorī Deizu) was released together with the 31st volume on February 17, 2012, and features an original story written by series creator Hiro Mashima. The fourth, "Fairies' Training Camp", is based on chapter 261 of the manga, and was released with the 35th volume on November 16, 2012. The fifth, "Exciting Ryuzetsu Land", (Note: ドキドキ・リュウゼツランド, Dokidoki Ryuzetsu Rando) is based on chapter 298 of the manga and was released with the 38th volume on June 17, 2013. A sixth OVA, titled "Fairy Tail x Rave" (Note: フェアリーテイル x レイヴ, Fearī Teiru x Reivu) is an adaptation of the omake of the same name and was released on August 16, 2013, with the 39th volume.

=== Theatrical films ===
A first anime film adaptation, titled Fairy Tail the Movie: Phoenix Priestess, was released on August 18, 2012. It was directed by Masaya Fujimori, and its screenplay was written by anime staff writer Masashi Sogo. Series creator Hiro Mashima was involved as the film's story planner and designer for guest characters appearing in the film. To promote the film, Mashima drew a 30-page prologue manga "The First Morning" (はじまりの朝, Hajimari no Asa), which was bundled with advance tickets for the film. The DVD was bundled with a special edition release of the 36th volume of the manga on February 13, 2013, and included an animated adaptation of "Hajimari no Asa" as a bonus extra. The film was aired on Animax Asia on March 23, 2013. Funimation has licensed North American distribution rights to the film. The English dub premiered at Nan Desu Kan on September 13, 2013, and was released on Blu-ray/DVD on December 10, 2013.

A second/sequel anime film was announced on May 15, 2015. On December 31, 2016, the official title of film was revealed as Fairy Tail: Dragon Cry, which was released on May 6, 2017, in Japan.

== Music ==
=== Audio ===
The music for the anime was composed and arranged by Yasuharu Takanashi. Four original soundtrack CDs have been released, containing music from the anime: the first soundtrack volume was released on January 6, 2010, the second volume on July 7, 2010, the third soundtrack volume on July 6, 2011, and the fourth soundtrack volume on March 20, 2013. Character song singles were also produced; the first single, featuring Tetsuya Kakihara (Natsu) and Yuichi Nakamura (Gray) was released on February 17, while the second single, featuring Aya Hirano (Lucy) and Rie Kugimiya (Happy), was released on March 3, 2010. Another character song album, entitled "Eternal Fellows," was released on April 27, 2011. Two of the songs from the album, performed by anime cast members Tetsuya Kakihara (Natsu) and Aya Hirano (Lucy), were used for both OVAs as the opening and ending themes, respectively. Other songs on the volume are performed by Yuichi Nakamura (Gray), Sayaka Ohara (Erza), Satomi Satō (Wendy), Wataru Hatano (Gajeel), and a duet by Rie Kugimiya (Happy) and Yui Horie (Carla).

An internet radio program began airing on HiBiKi Radio Station on February 11, 2012, featuring anime voice actors Tetsuya Kakihara (Natsu) and Mai Nakahara (Juvia) as announcers.

=== Opening themes ===
No.	Song Title	Artist	Episodes
1	"Snow Fairy"	Funkist	1–14
2	"S.O.W. Sense of Wonder"	Idoling!!!	15–24
3	"ft."	Funkist	25–35
4	"R.P.G. ~Rockin' Playing Game"	SuG	36–48
5	"Egao no Mahou"	Magic Party	49–60
6	"Fiesta"	+Plus	61–72
7	"Evidence"	Daisy x Daisy	73–85
8	"The Rock City Boy"	JAMIL	86–98
9	"Towa no Kizuna"	Daisy x Daisy feat. Another Infinity	99–111
10	"I Wish"	Milky Bunny	112–124
11	"Hajimari no Sora"	+Plus	125–137
12	"Tenohira"	HERO	138–150
13	"Breakthrough"	Going Under Ground	151–166
14	"Yakusoku no Hi"	Chihiro Yonekura	167–175
15	"Masayume Chasing"	BoA	176–188
16	"Strike Back"	Back-On	189–203
17	"Mysterious Magic"	Do As Infinity	204–214
18	"Break Out"	V6	215–226
19	"Yume-iro Graffiti"	Tackey & Tsubasa	227–239
20	"Never-End Tale"	Tatsuyuki Kobayashi & Konomi Suzuki	240–252
21	"Believe in Myself"	Edge of Life	253–265
22	"Ashita wo Narase"	Kavka Shishido	266–277
23	"Power of the Dream"	lol	278–290
24	"Down by Law"	The Rampage from Exile Tribe	291–303
25	"No-Limit"	Osaka Shunka Shuto	304–315
26	"MORE THAN LiKE"	BiSH	316–328

=== Ending themes ===
No.	Song Title	Artist	Episodes
1	"Kanpeki gu~no ne"	Watarirouka Hashiritai	1–14
2	"Tsunaide Te"	Chihiro Yonekura	15–24
3	"Gomen ne, Watashi"	Shiho Nanba	25–35
4	"Kimi ga Iru Kara"	Mikuni Shimokawa	36–48
5	"Holy Shine"	Daisy x Daisy	49–60
6	"-Be As One-"	w-inds.	61–72
7	"Lonely Person"	ShaNa	73–85
8	"Don't think. Feel!!!"	Idoling!!!	86–98
9	"Kono Te Nobashite"	Hi-Fi Camp	99–111
10	"Boys Be Ambitious!!"	Hi-Fi Camp	112–124
11	"Glitter (Starving Trancer Remix)"	Another Infinity feat. Mayumi Morinaga	125–137
12	"Yell: Kagayaku Tame no Mono"	Sata Andagi	138–150
13	"Kimi ga Kureta Mono"	Shizuka Kudo	151–166
14	"We're the Stars"	Aimi	167–175
15	"Kimi to Kare to Boku to Kanojo to"	Breathe	176–188
16	"Kokoro no Kagi"	May J.	189–203
17	"Kimi no Mirai"	Root Five	204–214
18	"Don't Let Me Down"	Mariya Nishiuchi	215–226
19	"Never Ever"	Tokyo Girls' Style	227–239
20	"Forever Here"	Yoko Ishida	240–252
21	"Azayaka na Tabiji"	Megumi Mori	253–265
22	"Landscape"	Solidemo	266–277
23	"Endless Harmony"	Beverly feat. Lullaby	278–290
24	"Pierce"	EMPiRE	291–303
25	"Boku to Kimi no Lullaby"	Miyuna	304–315
26	"Exceed"	Miyuna	316–328

=== Notable Insert Songs ===
Insert songs in Fairy Tail are often used to underscore high-emotional moments or final battle sequences. Most are composed by Yasuharu Takanashi and performed by the cast or featured artists.

Song Title	Artist	Usage / Context
"Main Theme"	Yasuharu Takanashi	Recurring battle theme; various versions used throughout the series
"Pastel"	Aya Hirano (Lucy)	Played during sentimental moments in season 1
"Snow Fairy (Acoustic)"	Funkist	Used during the emotional conclusion of the Phantom Lord arc
"Dragon Slayer"	Yasuharu Takanashi	Primary theme for Natsu, Gajeel, and Wendy's combat scenes
"Lightning Flame Dragon"	Yasuharu Takanashi	Used when Natsu combines his magic with Laxus's lightning
"Strike Back"	Back-On	Instrumental version used during the Grand Magic Games final day

== Reception ==
Fairy Tail has received a positive response from critics and viewers alike. In Southeast Asia, Fairy Tail won Animax Asia's "Anime of the Year" award in 2010. In 2012, the anime series won the "Meilleur Anime Japonais" (best Japanese anime) award and the best French dubbing award at the 19th Anime & Manga Grand Prix in Paris.

In reviewing the first Funimation Entertainment DVD volumes, Carlo Santos of Anime News Network praised the visuals, characters, and English voice acting, as well as the supporting characters for its comedic approach. However, Santos criticized both the anime's background music and CGI animation. In his review of the second volume, Santos also praised the development of "a more substantial storyline," but also criticized the inconsistent animation and original material not present in the manga. In his review of the third volume, Santos praised the improvements of the story and animation, and said that the volume "finally shows the [anime] series living up to its potential." In his reviews of the fourth and sixth volumes, however, Santos praised the storyline's formulaic pattern, though saying that "unexpected wrinkles in the story [...] keep the action from getting too stale," but calling the outcomes "unpredictable".
