= Deadman Wonderland =

Japanese manga series

- First tankōbon volume cover, featuring Ganta Igarashi (above) and Shiro (below)

デッドマンワンダーランド (Deddoman Wandārando)
- Genre: Action thriller; Dystopian; Post-apocalyptic
- Manga
- Written by: Jinsei Kataoka; Kazuma Kondou
- Published by: Kadokawa Shoten
- English publisher: NA: Tokyopop (former); Viz Media
- Magazine: Monthly Shōnen Ace
- Original run: April 26, 2007 – July 26, 2013
- Volumes: 13
- Anime television series
- Directed by: Kōichirō Hatsumi
- Produced by: Hisashi Imamoto; Takashi Kōchiyama
- Written by: Yasuyuki Mutō
- Music by: Narasaki
- Studio: Manglobe
- Licensed by: AUS: Madman Entertainment; NA: Crunchyroll; UK: Manga Entertainment
- Original network: tvk, GBS, TVQ, SUN, TVS, Tokyo MX, MTV, CTC, BS Nittele
- English network: US: Adult Swim (Toonami)
- Original run: April 17, 2011 – July 3, 2011
- Episodes: 12 + OVA
- icon

Deadman Wonderland (Japanese: デッドマンワンダーランド, Hepburn: Deddoman Wandārando) is a Japanese manga series written and illustrated by Jinsei Kataoka and Kazuma Kondou. It was serialized in Kadokawa Shoten's Monthly Shōnen Ace from April 2007 to July 2013, with its chapters collected in 13 tankōbon volumes. Tokyopop acquired the licensing rights to distribute the manga in English and released the first five volumes before the company shut down its North American publishing division in 2011. The series was later licensed by Viz Media, who published the 13 volumes from February 2014 to February 2016.

A 12-episode anime television series adaptation produced by Manglobe aired between April and July 2011, pulling content from the first 21 chapters of the manga. The anime is licensed by Funimation and aired on Adult Swim's newly revived Toonami programming block between May and August 2012.

== Plot ==
A massive anomaly caused a great earthquake that ravaged Japan's mainland and destroyed most of Tokyo, sinking three-quarters of the city into the Pacific Ocean.

Ten years later, Ganta Igarashi is a seemingly ordinary ninth grader attending Nagano Prefecture's middle school who survived the great earthquake, leaving him with a normal life and no memories of the tragedy. This all changes when a mysterious person covered in blood and crimson armor floats through his classroom windows and massacres his entire class, but spares Ganta and embeds a red crystal shard into his chest. Within days of the massacre, Ganta is placed on trial as a suspect. Due to evidence rigged against him, he is sentenced to death at Deadman Wonderland, a prison that doubles as a theme park run by warden Tsunenaga Tamaki (who posed as Ganta's lawyer and was secretly responsible for the manipulated evidence).

At the prison, Ganta is fitted with a special collar that monitors his location and vital signs. A lethal poison is constantly injected into his bloodstream through the collar, but it can be neutralized by consuming a peculiar candy-like medicine every three days, which can be acquired through various activities in the prison, such as performing for audiences, working backstage, and purchasing with Cast Points (a form of currency among inmates at Deadman Wonderland). To gather Cast Points, an inmate must participate in the facility's lethal games and survive. Fortunately for Ganta, he is aided by a mysterious albino girl named Shiro, who appears to know Ganta, and Yoh Takami, a fellow prisoner hoarding Cast Points to free his sister, who was imprisoned for murder after their mother neglected to protect her during the earthquake.

While trying to survive as an inmate on death row, Ganta intends to find the "Red Man" to clear his name. In a bizarre twist, Ganta develops the ability to manipulate his blood, eventually becoming able to turn it into a weapon. Unbeknownst to Ganta, he has become one of the prison's "Deadmen," an isolated group of prisoners possessing the Branches of Sin, the capability to control their blood. After discovering his ability, Ganta is forced to participate in brutal gladiatorial death matches known as Carnival Corpse, whose anonymous spectators pay large amounts of money to watch. In his long struggle to survive, he manages to befriend some of those he fought in the arena and with their help, Ganta continues his quest to uncover the identity of the 'Red Man', why he turned into a Deadman, and the dark secrets the prison authorities are hiding.

== Media ==
=== Manga ===
Written and illustrated by Jinsei Kataoka and Kazuma Kondou, Deadman Wonderland was serialized in Kadokawa Shoten's shōnen manga magazine Monthly Shōnen Ace from April 26, 2007, to July 26, 2013. Kadokawa Shoten collected its chapters in 13 tankōbon volumes, released from September 21, 2007, to August 21, 2013.

In North America, the manga was first licensed for English release by Tokyopop. The publisher released five volumes from February 9, 2010, to May 3, 2011, before ceasing its publication. The manga was later licensed by Viz Media, and the 13 volumes were released from February 11, 2014, to February 9, 2016.

==== Volumes ====
No.	Original release date	Original ISBN	English release date	English ISBN
1	September 21, 2007	978-4-04-713974-9	February 9, 2010 (Tokyopop); February 11, 2014 (Viz Media)	978-1-42-781741-9 (Tokyopop); 978-1-42-155548-5 (Viz Media)
1. "Who Killed Cock Robin"; 2. "Rule of Rules"; 3. "Dying Happy Dog Race"; 4. "Slayer's Slave"
2	December 20, 2007	978-4-04-715014-0	June 8, 2010 (Tokyopop); April 8, 2014 (Viz Media)	978-1-42-781742-6 (Tokyopop); 978-1-42-156410-4 (Viz Media)
5. "Necro Macro"; 6. "Crow Claw"; 7. "Carnival Corpse"; 8. "Bloodthirsty Majesty"
3	May 22, 2008	978-4-04-715065-2	October 12, 2010 (Tokyopop); June 10, 2014 (Viz Media)	978-1-42-781743-3 (Tokyopop); 978-1-42-156411-1 (Viz Media)
9. "Liar Flower"; 10. "Big Bad Bingo"; 11. "Past Time, Tight End"; 12. "Scar Chain"
4	October 22, 2008	978-4-04-715126-0	February 8, 2011 (Tokyopop); August 12, 2014 (Viz Media)	978-1-42-781744-0 (Tokyopop); 978-1-42-156412-8 (Viz Media)
13. "Cloudy After Sunny"; 14. "Ring Her Bell"; 15. "Man is the Archenemy of Man"; 16. "Salty Cookies"
5	April 23, 2009	978-4-04-715207-6	May 3, 2011 (Tokyopop); October 14, 2014 (Viz Media)	978-1-42-781790-7 (Tokyopop); 978-1-42-156413-5 (Viz Media)
17. "Loser's Answer"; 18. "Chain Gang"; 19. "Bloody Rainy Day"; 20. "Relief to Nirvana"; 21. "Ghost in the Sun"
6	August 22, 2009	978-4-04-715279-3	December 9, 2014	978-1-42-156414-2
22. "Tongue and Every Day"; 23. "The Fake Face"; 24. "Anger Song, Under Peace"; 25. "Failure Firing"; 26. "Blue Sky with Blue Devils"
7	January 22, 2010	978-4-04-715365-3	February 10, 2015	978-1-42-156415-9
27. "All Right All Night"; 28. "Mask or Mind"; 29. "Never Say Never Again"; 30. "Stupendous Stupid"; 31. "Although Ganta Tries To Stop Forgeries"
8	August 24, 2010	978-4-04-715506-0	April 14, 2015	978-1-42-156416-6
32. "Dog Eat Dog"; 33. "Beaming Beauty-badass"; 34. "Bare Fire"; 35. "Dice with Death"; 36. "Bye Bye, Baby"
9	March 24, 2011	978-4-04-715652-4	June 9, 2015	978-1-42-156417-3
37. "Finish Everything"; 38. "End Game - A Flame"; 39. "Despotic Despair"; 40. "The Beginning of the Ending"
10	May 24, 2011	978-4-04-715699-9	August 11, 2015	978-1-42-156418-0
41. "Freedom of Martyrdom"; 42. "Kill My Will"; 43. "Storm Center"; 44. "Faced with Fate"
11	October 22, 2011	978-4-04-715802-3	October 13, 2015	978-1-42-156528-6
45. "Past the Passion"; 46. "Whacked Wicked"; 47. "Sing a Sin"; 48. "Aboveground Abortive Flower"
12	May 22, 2013	978-4-04-120730-7	December 8, 2015	978-1-42-156420-3
49. "Head-to-Head"; 50. "Toy Gun & Toy Town Trust"; 51. "Die in a Diamond"; 52. "Haggard Absurd"
13	August 21, 2013	978-4-04-120777-2	February 9, 2016	978-1-42-156419-7
53. "Love Phobe"; 54. "The Shut-Up Reason"; 55. "A Foolish Wish"; 56. "Last Dance"; 57. "But the Parade Will Go On"

=== Anime ===
On July 30, 2009, a retailers' solicitation sheet reported that an anime adaptation had been green-lit. It is animated by Manglobe and aired in Japan from April 17 to July 3, 2011. An original video animation episode was released on October 8, 2011, alongside the eleventh manga volume. The opening theme is "One Reason" by Fade and the ending theme is "Shiny Shiny" by Nirgilis. The series was licensed by Funimation in 2011. The anime was broadcast on the revived Toonami block from May 27 to August 12, 2012. The anime aired in North America on the Funimation Channel on December 1, 2012.

==== Episodes ====
No.	Title	Original release date	English air date
1	"Death Row Inmate"; Transliteration: "Shikeisyuu" (Japanese: 死刑囚)	April 17, 2011	May 27, 2012
As Ganta Igarashi and his classmates plan for a class trip to Deadman Wonderland, a privately owned prison that also serves as an amusement park, a mysterious "Red Man" appears, killing his entire class and thrusting a red stone into Ganta's chest. Being the only survivor out of the entire class, Ganta is charged with mass murder and, due to the overwhelming and doctored evidence against him with no way to prove his innocence, he is sentenced to death and sent to Deadman Wonderland's prison. As some of the higher ups plot to kill Ganta in an "accident", Ganta meets a strange white-haired girl named Shiro, who manages to read his heart and understand him. When a bunch of bullies start attacking Ganta and Shiro, an explosion causes a large object to fall towards Ganta. However, Ganta's desire to keep living so he can kill the Red Man activates the powers that were implanted in him, allowing him to control his blood to save himself as well as Shiro.
2	"Antidote (Candy)"; Transliteration: "Gedokuzai (Kyandi)" (Japanese: 解毒剤 (キャンディ))	April 24, 2011	June 3, 2012
Ganta learns from a fellow inmate, Yō Takami, that in order to have a decent meal in the prison, he needs to earn "cast points". He learns of a "dog race" in which he can win a big prize, which he and Shiro decide to enter. In the locker room, they encounter a fierce inmate named Kazumasa Kouzuji who drives fear into the others until Makina, the prison warden, silences him. Ganta soon learns that in order to avoid being killed by a poison, he needs to eat an antidote known as "candy", which was secretly stolen from his bag by Yō the other day. Ganta realizes that in order to survive, he needs to win the race in order to purchase a new one, but he soon learns the course is littered with actual death traps. Thanks in part to Shiro's innocent manner, Ganta and Shiro make it to the final stage against Kasumasa, where they have to hold onto a ball and avoid falling into a spike pit. Ganta decides to stand up to Kazumasa, who eventually falls to his death. In the closing moments of the round, Ganta is forced to sacrifice the ball, and the prize money, in order to keep Shiro from falling and keep their promise of eating the runner up prize together.
3	"G Block"; Transliteration: "Jī tō" (Japanese: G棟)	May 1, 2011	June 10, 2012
Put in charge of observing him by the promoter Tsunenaga Tamaki, Yō gives Ganta a piece of candy so he can keep living, unaware that Yō is putting him in his debt. Meanwhile, the Red Man, now known as the Wretched Egg, breaks loose and appears before Ganta. Then, Ganta tries attacking the Wretched Egg using his own abilities, but the Wretched Egg escapes not long before Ganta falls unconscious. After waking up, Ganta hears from the other witnesses that they keep the Wretched Egg locked up in the G-Block of the prison, so he and Shiro head towards there. Deeming him dangerous, Makina puts the facility on lock-down and sends a fierce security robot after Ganta. As it approaches them, Ganta and Yō follow Shiro into a secret passage leading to the G-Block. As Shiro confronts the robot, it is destroyed by the arrival of another inmate with the same powers as Ganta.
4	"Crow Claw"; Transliteration: "Kurō Kurō" (Japanese: クロウ・クロウ)	May 8, 2011	June 17, 2012
Believing him to be the Red Man, Ganta attacks the strange inmate known as Senji Kiyomasa, but falls at a disadvantage against the blades Senji can form with his blood. After learning the nature of his power called the Branch of Sin, Ganta launches a counterattack. Ganta soon realizes that Senji is not the Wretched Egg, but one of several "deadmen" with the Branch of Sin. Senji tries to attack Ganta again, but finds himself weak against Shiro before a special unit appears, tranquilizing Ganta and Senji and taking Shiro and Yō to an empty corridor. As Ganta is examined, he comes face to face with Tamaki who reveals he rigged Ganta's jury verdict to get him sent to Deadman Wonderland before revealing Ganta will face off against Senji in a battle the next day, tempting him with the prospect of coming face to face with the Wretched Egg. As Ganta is tortured with footage of what a "carnival corpse" entails, Makina decides to confront the chief director concerning the mysteries of G-Block.
5	"Carrion Festival (Carnival Corpse)"; Transliteration: "Shiniku-sai (Kānibaru Kōpusu)" (Japanese: 死肉祭(カーニバル・コープス))	May 15, 2011	June 24, 2012
Makina is halted by Chan and En, bodyguards of the chief director, preventing her from entering his office. Ganta is thrust into his carnival corpse match with Senji and is at a disadvantage as his projectiles use too much blood and cause him to develop anemia. As he becomes helpless, he recalls memories of Shiro and manages to stand back up, using the environment to get a hit on Senji. After escaping from the corridor, Shiro and Yō head towards G-Block after Yō hears the whereabouts of a woman he is searching for. After Ganta recovers from his victory, he is horrified to find that Senji is forced to have one of his eyes removed as a result of losing. As Yō uses Shiro as a diversion so he can escape on his own, he bears witness to her true destructive ability, as she herself has the Branch of Sin.
6	"Hummingbird"; Transliteration: "Hamingu Bādo" (Japanese: ハミング・バード)	May 22, 2011	July 1, 2012
As Shiro falls unconscious and is picked up by Chan and En while Yō continues his way to G-Block, Ganta meets a girl named Minatsuki Takami, another deadman who had killed her abusive father. Ganta offers to help Minatsuki escape, but soon learns she is his opponent in the next carnival corpse match. When the match begins, Minatsuki's personality changes completely and attacks with her whip-like Branch of Sin, revealing she had manipulated him into taking an injury prior to the match. However, Yō appears, revealing Minatsuki to be his little sister, saying that he plans to gain enough cast points to buy her freedom before entering the arena. Minatsuki tries to manipulate Yō against Ganta, but he turns on her instead, having learned the truth behind his father's death. Minatsuki captures Yō and uses him as a human shield against Ganta, revealing she has shown hatred ever since her mother left her for dead during the Red Hole incident. Ganta manages to disable one of her whips and free Yō, before knocking her out with a headbutt, winning the match.
7	"Original Sin (Wretched Egg)"; Transliteration: "Genzai (Rechiddo Eggu)" (Japanese: 原罪(レチッド・エッグ))	May 29, 2011	July 8, 2012
After a strange quake occurs during which Yō rushes to keep Minatsuki from harm, Ganta starts to remember things about Shiro, who is revealed to be the Wretched Egg. As Ganta recalls his childhood with Shiro, Yō cannot bring himself to mention what he had seen her do. As Yō goes to recover the casts that were stolen from him, he learns from Tamaki that casts cannot be used to reduce the sentences on G-Block inmates and is attacked by Azuma Genkaku, part of an anti-deadman force known as the Undertakers. Meanwhile, Ganta meets Nagi Kengamine and Karako Koshio, members of a deadman prison gang known as Scar Chain wanting to destroy Deadman Wonderland. Nagi and Karako invite Ganta to join their gang. As Minatsuki goes through her penalty game, Nagi arranges it so that she only loses her hair. Just then, Genkaku appears and attacks Ganta and the others.
8	"Chains of Freedom (Scar Chain)"; Transliteration: "Jiyū no Kusari (Sukā Chein)" (Japanese: 自由の鎖(スカーチェイン))	June 5, 2011	July 15, 2012
Ganta is saved by the arrival of Shiro, who is back under control by the lullaby, to which Genkaku decides to retreat. Afterwards, Ganta is introduced to the other members of Scar Chain, who oppose the prison and are plotting to expose Deadman Wonderland's secrets on inspection week. Makina also plans to take advantage of to find out what secrets are being hidden from her. However, Ganta becomes a little distrustful when his claims of his Branch of Sin being stopped by Genkaku differ from what the security cameras show and takes his leave. Ganta later learns from Senji about how Genkaku killed Nagi's wife, also hearing from Nagi about how each member of Scar Chain has their own ideas of freedom. As Ganta promises to take Shiro on a Ferris wheel when they escape someday, it is shown that one of Scar Chain's members named Bundō Rokuro is a double agent for the Undertakers. Ganta decides to join Scar Chain, who begin their operation to leak information about the deadmen to the outside world. As Nagi and Rokuro go to the security room, Ganta and the others are chased by an acid spewing robot, to which Karako opts to stay behind to save the others.
9	"Pro-oxidant (Worm Eater)"; Transliteration: "Sanka Sokushin-zai (Wāmu Ītā)" (Japanese: 酸化促進剤(ワームイーター))	June 12, 2011	July 22, 2012
After recalling the time she joined Scar Chain, Karako defends herself from the acid spewing robot and destroys it, falling down with it. Meanwhile, Nagi is betrayed by Rokuro and confronted by an Undertaker named Hibana Daida, who uses a special weapon to neutralize his Branch of Sin. As Hibana starts slicing off bits of Nagi's flesh, he provokes her into chopping off his arm by mentioning of her abusive mother, giving him the opportunity to activate the elevator Ganta's group needs to take. However, Ganta's group is confronted by Genkaku and his men, leaving only Ganta and a few others left alive to carry the chip containing the information. While bleeding to death, Nagi makes a call to the hideout, which is heard by Shiro who catches up to Ganta and throws the chip into a fire.
10	"Caretaker (Undertaker)"; Transliteration: "Hakamori (Andāteikā)" (Japanese: 墓守(アンダーテイカー))	June 19, 2011	July 29, 2012
Ganta becomes angry at Shiro for throwing away the data chip, telling her he never wants to see her again and proceeded to punch her. Meanwhile, Makina investigates Tamaki's office, overhearing a conversation between him and the defense secretary concerning the deadmen. As Karako and the others discuss their next plan, Rokuro appears and reveals the data chip was actually a bomb he had made before announcing that the group is being held hostage unless Nagi agrees to become an Undertaker. As Rokuro decides to execute Ganta first, Senji appears on the scene, managing to fight back against the Undertakers using sonic blasts. As Shiro laments her situation with Ganta, she meets Toto Sakigami, the one who told her about the bomb.
11	"GIG of Despair"; Transliteration: "Zetsubō no GIG" (Japanese: 絶望のGIG)	June 26, 2011	August 5, 2012
Detesting his weak self, Ganta asks Senji to teach him how to use his Branch of Sin to fight. Meanwhile, Karako attempts to infiltrate the Undertakers by disguising herself as a guard. As Toto appears before Ganta and Senji during their training session, Shiro, who gets drunk off of liquor sweets, appears before Genkaku, who also discovers Karako. Just as Ganta manages to produce a blood bullet that can break the sound barrier, Genkaku announces his capturing of Shiro and Karako. Despite being low on blood, Ganta rushes to where Genkaku is keeping them, but is confronted by Nagi, who had been mentally broken by Genkaku and turned into a raging demon.
12	"Relief (Grateful Dead)"; Transliteration: "Kyūsai (Gureitofuru Deddo)" (Japanese: 救済(グレイトフルデッド))	July 3, 2011	August 12, 2012
As Nagi goes on a rampage on all the guards, Ganta stands to protect Shiro, taking all of his punches and trying to reason with him. Then, as Nagi starts to come to his senses thanks to the bell Karako wears reminding him of his friends, Karako is suddenly stabbed by Genkaku. Nagi stands to protect his friends but is shot by Genkaku, who begins killing the other guards, while Ganta starts being poisoned due to not having any candy in a while. Hibana tries to escape but is killed by Toto, who had managed to obtain Senji's abilities after drinking his blood. As Shiro enters the Wretched Egg mode, the stone in Ganta's chest glows and blasts a powerful shot, with Nagi holding Genkaku in place as they are both mortally wounded. Before dying, Nagi gives Ganta his last piece of candy. As Karako and some others escape, Ganta decides to stay behind so he can protect his friends. Toto becomes fascinated with Ganta's Branch of Sin, eager to know how it tastes. At the end of the episode Shiro sings a lullaby to Ganta, who remarks that he last heard the lullaby just before his classroom was attacked by the Red Man.
OVA	"Wielder of the Red Knife"; Transliteration: "Akai Naifu Tsukai" (Japanese: 赤いナイフ使い)	October 8, 2011 (DVD/Blu-Ray Only)	October 9, 2012 (DVD/Blu-Ray Only)
Set two years after the Red Hole incident, Senji is a police officer using his Branch of Sin to fight criminals, but has little temper. One day, he rescues a boy named Izuru who stole from a gang called Goreless Peace. After returning him to Hinata, the caretaker of an orphanage, Senji encounters Goreless Peace's leader, Keigo Ugachi, who also possesses the Branch of Sin. When Senji refuses to join him, he burns down the orphanage and kills everyone in it, including Izuru and Hinata. Devastated, Senji goes to confront Keigo, gaining some support from his police colleagues. However, Senji finds himself in a giant spider web formed from Keigo's powers. When Keigo injures Senji's superior, Senji manages to break the sound barrier to break through Keigo's ability, barely holding back enough to not kill him.

=== Music ===
Two pieces of theme music are used for the episodes: one opening theme and one ending theme. The opening theme is "One Reason" by Deadman Wonder Band (DWB) feat. Fade, while the ending is "Shiny Shiny" by DWB feat. NIRGILIS. The two themes are used in all 13 episodes. Certain characters also have their own image songs: Ganta, Shiro, Genkaku and Minatsuki all have songs; these songs are created by DWB and NIRGILIS, with each character's voice actor serving as vocalist.

=== Other media ===
Shiro's costume is featured in the video game Lollipop Chainsaw. It can be unlocked during gameplay by using the coins at the closet menu.

== Reception ==
On June 12, 2015, the Chinese Ministry of Culture listed Deadman Wonderland among 38 anime and manga titles banned in China.

== See also ==
- Eureka Seven, an anime series whose manga adaptation was written and illustrated by the same authors
