= List of Sekirei episodes =

Sekirei
- The first DVD volume of Sekirei released in Japan by Aniplex on October 22, 2008.
- Native name
- Japanese: セキレイ
- No. of episodes: 25

Release
- Original network: Chiba TV, KBS Kyoto, Nagoya Broadcasting Network, Sun TV, Tokyo MX, TV Hokkaido, TV Kanagawa, TV Saitama, AT-X, TVQ
- Original release: July 2, 2008 – September 26, 2010

Sekirei is an anime series based on the manga of the same title by Sakurako Gokurakuin. Produced by Aniplex and Seven Arcs and directed by Keizō Kusakawa, the story revolves around a college student named Minato Sahashi, whose entire life changes when he meets a Sekirei named Musubi, and later gets involved in a deadly survival game between Sekireis and their masters, or Ashikabis, called the Sekirei Plan.

Sekirei was broadcast in Japan on Tokyo MX from July 2 and September 17, 2008. The anime adapts the first fifty chapters of the series. Six uncut DVDs of the first season were released between October 22, 2008 and March 25, 2009. The sixth DVD volume features an original video animation episode titled "The First Errand", which involves Kusano in a shopping race between Musubi and Tsukiumi. A Blu-ray box set of the first season was released on June 30, 2010, with three Blu-ray discs and one additional CD.

A second season, titled Sekirei: Pure Engagement, aired in Japan from July 4 to September 26, 2010, on Tokyo MX with subsequent runs on AT-X, KBS Kyoto, Nagoya Broadcasting Network, Sun TV, TV Hokkaido, and TVQ Kyushu Broadcasting. The limited edition of the Hakuyoku no Seiyaku ~Pure Engagement~/Onnaji Kimochi CD single came bundled with a special three-minute OVA, classified as episode 0, titled "Two Topic Gossip". The full 28-minute version of the OVA was released with the first BD/DVD volume of the second season on August 25, 2010. Both anime seasons are licensed by Funimation for distribution in North America. A DVD box set of first season was released on November 23, 2010.

The opening theme in the first season is "Sekirei" and the ending theme is "Dear sweet heart"; both songs are performed by Saori Hayami (#88 Musubi), Marina Inoue (#9 Tsukiumi), Kana Hanazawa (#108 Kusano), Aya Endo (#2 Matsu). The ending theme used for episode 11 is "Kimi o Omou Toki" (きみを想うとき; "When I Think of You") by Saori Hayami. The opening and ending themes were released as part of the Sekirei Original Soundtrack, released on July 23, 2008. The opening theme for Pure Engagement is "Hakuyoku no Seiyaku ~Pure Engagement~" (白翼ノ誓約～Pure Engagement～) while the ending theme is "Onnaji Kimochi" (おんなじきもち), both of them sung by Saori Hayami, Marina Inoue, Kana Hanazawa and Aya Endo, as it was in the first season. The ending theme for episode 10 is "Oboeteiru kara" (おぼえているから; "Remembering You") by Saori Hayami. The tracks are released in the Hakuyoku no Seiyaku ~Pure Engagement~/Onnaji Kimochi CD and the Sekirei Sound Complete CD.

Individual episodes of the series are called feathers (羽, hane), in reference to birds and the winging process of the Sekireis.

== Series overview ==
Season	Episodes	Originally released	
Season	Episodes	First released	Last released
1	12+OVA	July 2, 2008	September 17, 2008
2	13+OVA	July 4, 2010	September 26, 2010

== Episode list ==
=== Sekirei (2008) ===
No.	Title	Original release date
1	"Sekirei"; Transliteration: "Sekirei" (Japanese: セキレイ)	July 2, 2008
After finding out that he failed the entrance exams to Shinto Teito/Tokyo University for the second time, Minato Sahashi, a typical ronin student, finds his life suddenly changed after meeting a strange girl named Musubi. In very dramatic circumstances, Minato discovers that she is a "Sekirei" and that he is her "Ashikabi" (ie. partner/Master). However, after Musubi moves in with Minato, he gets into trouble with the landlord because he violated the landlord's rules about living in the apartment, and the two are evicted. He and Musubi search for a new place to live, but have no luck in finding a place to stay due to Minato's non-university student status. While Minato is utterly disheartened, Musubi encourages him and, using her Norito, sends them both soaring into the night sky.
2	"The Door to a New Residence"; Transliteration: "Shin'ya no Tobira" (Japanese: 新屋の扉)	July 9, 2008
Because of Musubi's lack of foresight in knowing how to safely land, she and Minato crash down into the back yard of a house, where they encounter a young woman named Miya Asami, who runs a boarding house called Izumo Inn and who treats them kindly. They learn that Izumo Inn is looking for new boarders, and are allowed to stay after Miya hears them out.
3	"The Green Girl"; Transliteration: "Midori no Shōjo" (Japanese: 緑ノ少女)	July 16, 2008
After he and Musubi finish moving into Izumo Inn, Minato takes a job at a local construction site where he meets another Ashikabi, Kaoru Seo. Drawn by visions of a young Sekirei girl named Kusano, Minato infiltrates a nearby botanical garden with Seo's help after Seo and his Sekirei Hikari and Hibiki eliminate a MBI roadblock in front of the garden. Racing to find Kusano, Minato finds her about to be abducted by another Sekirei whose Ashikabi wants Kusano for himself. Musubi, who's been looking for Minato, arrives just in time and defeats the Sekirei. Minato brings Kusano to Izumo Inn, and she later makes Minato her Ashikabi.
4	"The Strange Tale of Maison Izumo"; Transliteration: "Izumosō Kidan" (Japanese: 出雲荘奇談)	July 23, 2008
Minato, Musubi and Kusano are startled by the mysterious appearances of a ghost-like figure at Izumo Inn. Unknown to him, Minato is being secretly monitored by a mysterious girl. When Musubi leaves to buy groceries, she is attacked by a satellite weapon controlled by the mysterious girl, who then ambushes Minato in the Bath. Minato's younger sister Yukari meets Sekirei Shina for the first time when she rescues him from two Sekirei, and takes him back to her apartment.
5	"The Water Sekirei"; Transliteration: "Mizu no Sekirei" (Japanese: 水ノ鶺鴒)	July 30, 2008
The mysterious girl turns out to be Matsu, a Sekirei who has been hiding at the Inn, and she later becomes Minato's third Sekirei. Minato has dreams of another Sekirei, later identified as Tsukiumi. Despite the fact that Tsukiumi despises Ashikabi, Matsu convinces Minato that Tsukiumi would be a valuable addition to his team, and he, with Kusano as his "bodyguard", goes looking for her (minitored via satellite by Matsu). Minato and Kusano encounter Seo, and Hikari and Hibiki soon arrive chased by Tsukiumi, whom they had provoked into fighting. When Tsukiumi realizes that Minato is her potential Ashikabi, she immediately attacks him.
6	"Maison Izumo's Flower War"; Transliteration: "Izumosō Hana Ikusa" (Japanese: 出雲荘花軍)	August 6, 2008
Tsukiumi attacks Minato to prove that she does not need an Ashikabi, but she cannot release her full power. Hibiki and Hikari show her the power of fully winged Sekirei using their Norito, but Minato shields her from the attack. Finally understanding Minato's feelings after he saves her from being "molested" by Seo, Tsukiumi becomes his newest Sekirei (although she is not pleased to find that he has other Sekirei), leading to a comical homecoming.
7	"The Black Sekirei"; Transliteration: "Kuro no Sekirei" (Japanese: 黒ノ鶺鴒)	August 13, 2008
Karasuba, a dangerous and lethal Sekirei who is the leader of MBI's Disciplinary Squad, pays Musubi a visit at Izumo Inn and reaffirms a promise the two made in the past. MBI Director Hiroto Minaka initiates the second phase of the Sekirei Plan and blockades Tokyo with armed personnel from MBI's Security Services. Miya establishes new sleeping arrangements at the Inn, to the displeasure of Minato's Sekirei. Yukari and Shina (disguised by Yukari in female clothing) go shopping, but attract the attention of another Ashikabi.
8	"The Closed Capital"; Transliteration: "Tojita Teito" (Japanese: 閉ジタ帝都)	August 20, 2008
Sekirei #95, Kuno, and her Ashikabi Haruka Shigi attempt to escape Tokyo despite the lockdown, but are pursued by MBI soldiers and members of the Disciplinary Squad. While Uzume visits her Ashikabi Chiho in the hospital, Yukari resolves to help Shina search for Kusano. Matsu uncovers information about Sekirei being defeated by an unidentified assailant, leading Tsukiumi and Musubi to go out to find the "veiled" Sekirei (unaware that it is Uzume) and find her after she has cornered Kuno and her Ashikabi.
9	"The Veil and the Wind"; Transliteration: "Hire to Kaze" (Japanese: 比礼ト風)	August 27, 2008
The fight between Tsukiumi and the "veiled" Sekirei (Uzume) ends abruptly due to the interference of Sekirei #03, Kazehana, who escapes with Uzume. Musubi takes Minato to meet Kuno and Shigi, who explains that since Kuno is too weak to battle, they've decided to escape from the city, but there are too many obstacles. With Musubi's encouragement, Minato agrees to help them. That night, Kazehana and Uzume stumble into Minato's room in a drunken stupor (while he's asleep in it), causing Minato much grief with his Sekirei (and Landlady Miya) in the morning.
10	"The Night Before the Escape"; Transliteration: "Dasshutsu Zen'ya" (Japanese: 脱出前夜)	September 3, 2008
Kazehana finds herself being drawn to Minato. Shigi tells the others about how he and Kuno first met. Minato and Musubi take them to see Seo, who gives them information about the Disciplinary Squad and other dangerous Ashikabi in the city. After some telephonic "prompting" from Miya (courtesy of Minato), Seo agrees to help them escape the city. Later that evening, a party is held at Izumo Inn. Despite knowing that her absence would greatly weaken their chances of success, Tsukiumi refuses to help Shigi and Kuno escape, believing their actions to be cowardly.
11	"The Sekirei Symbol Disappears"; Transliteration: "Sekireimon Shōshitsu" (Japanese: 鶺鴒紋消失)	September 10, 2008
The escape plan commences, and while Matsu blocks satellite surveillance, Kusano causes mayhem with her giant growing plants and Seo and his Sekirei shut down a power plant (i.e., blow it up), Minato and the others race along the planned escape route. Matsu, leaving the safety of Izumo Inn for the first time, rushes to the scene via motorcycle and saves Kusano after she becomes surrounded by MBI Security Service soldiers. The group makes it to the railway bridge that leads to freedom, but are confronted by Benitsubasa and Haihane, members of the Disciplinary Squad with orders to prevent Kuno and Shigi from leaving Shinto Teito at all costs. Kuno uses her Norito, a pacifying song, to try and stop the Disciplinary Squad, but collapses. Musubi battles Benitsubasa, but is brutally beaten down. As Minato watches in horror, Musubi's Sekirei crest vanishes, meaning she has been Terminated.
12	"The Sekirei of Fate"; Transliteration: "Enishi no Sekirei" (Japanese: 縁ノ鶺鴒)	September 17, 2008
Minato is in despair at Musubi's Termination, but refuses to give up, much to Benitsubasa's irritation, who proceeds to deal with him. Tsukiumi arrives and, grief-stricken at Musubi's fate, battles Haihane. Elsewhere, Yukari and Shina are cornered by another Ashikabi and his Sekirei and decide to become winged, thus unleashing Shina's full power and repulsing the attack. But in a twist of fate, someone from Karasuba's past comes to Minato's aid in assisting Kuno and Shigi.
OVA	"Kusano's First Shopping Trip"; Transliteration: "Hajimete no Otsukai" (Japanese: 初メテノオツカイ)	March 26, 2009
Musubi and Tsukiumi have another shopping race, with the winner allowed to sit at Minato's side during dinner on a permanent basis. Kusano decides to participate in the race, but does not do well due to the fact that she frequently becomes lost and is easily distracted from her task. Musubi and Tsukiumi appreciate the effort and determination that Kusano puts into a race that she has no chance of winning; they decide to take pity on her and team up with Matsu to secretly help her.

=== Sekirei: Pure Engagement (2010) ===
No. overall	No. in season	Title	Original release date
13	1	"Silent Omen"; Transliteration: "Shizunaru Yochō" (Japanese: 静ナル予兆)	June 13, 2010 (pre-release); July 4, 2010 (TV)
Things calm down at Izumo Inn (for the most part) as tensions rise for MBI with Sekirei and Ashikabi from all over Shinto Teito trying to escape. Something big is surely set to happen. Meanwhile, Benitsubasa plots her revenge on Musubi, but the information she needs cannot be accessed and Karasuba (who knows more than she's telling) isn't talking.
14	2	"The Wind Blows"; Transliteration: "Kaze Tachinu" (Japanese: 風立チヌ)	July 11, 2010
Tensions in the city continue to escalate. Minato and Tsukiumi are going to meet up with his sister Yukari when they are attacked by Haihane, who draws Tsukiumi away. With Minato left alone, Benitsubasa captures him and attempts to draw Musubi out with a series of phone calls that start out threatening but end comically. While Matsu and the others try to determine Minato's location, Kazehana manages to track him to a sake warehouse, but must face both Benitsubasa and Haihane in order to rescue Minato.
15	3	"The Wind's Answer"; Transliteration: "Kaze no Irae" (Japanese: 風ノ答エ)	July 18, 2010
Kazehana begins fighting a losing battle, but when Minato protects her from certain danger, she kisses him to acquire her wings, then easily defeats the Disciplinary Squad duo. Musubi and Tsukiumi arrive, and while Musubi is pleased at Minato's acquiring a new Sekirei Tsukiumi is not. A squabble is averted when they realize Minato has been severely injured, and they take Minato to an MBI hospital. There, he learns his mother, Takami, is part of MBI, and the visiting Karasuba reminds Musubi of what is between them. A few days later, Minato is released from the hospital and returns to Izumo Inn, where his new Sekirei Kazehana has moved in. Meanwhile, Uzume receives new instructions from her blackmailing control about targeted Sekirei.
16	4	"The Final Feather"; Transliteration: "Saigo no Hitoha" (Japanese: 最後ノ一羽)	July 25, 2010
Uzume starts to feel the weight of eliminating other Sekireis to make sure her Ashikabi is safe and leaves Izumo Inn. Kagari starts reacting more to Minato, furthering his disgust of having a male Ashikabi. In a moment of weakness, he faints in Minato's arms, but after recovering himself tries to kill Minato, only to find that his flame power won't obey him, and a water deluge from Tsukiumi makes him comes to his senses. Kagari plans to leave Izumo Inn to try and kill Minaka. Meanwhile, Minaka sends out another message to all Ashikabi that one last unwinged Sekirei remains in the north, meaning Kagari.
17	5	"The Sekirei of Flame"; Transliteration: "Honō no Sekirei" (Japanese: 炎ノ鶺鴒)	August 1, 2010
Minato realizes that Kagari is a Sekirei, #06 Homura, and tells him about Minaka's message, and despite the danger to himself Homura heads out and try to kill Minaka, but runs into other Sekirei wishing to capture him for their Ashikabi. Minato receives a call on Homura's phone from Minato's mother telling him of Homura's danger. Minato's Sekirei all encourage him to help Homura emerge, and despite his own feelings about winging a male Sekirei he and his Sekirei set off to defend Homura before other Sekireis and their Ashikabi arrive. However, Homura has already been cornered by both Uzume and Akitsu, who begin battling each other for Kagari's possession.
18	6	"Words of Binding"; Transliteration: "Kunagu Kotoba" (Japanese: 婚グ言葉)	August 8, 2010
Akitsu continues to fend off Uzume while Homura begins to lose control of his powers. Then, when Mikogami orders Mutsu to interfere in the fight between Akitsu and Uzume and capture Homura, Izumi Higa's secretary Kakizaki appears with some of Higa's Sekireis. Realizing it would be useless to fight against Kakizaki, Higa's Sekireis and the other Sekireis gathering around, Mutsu retreats along with Mikogami and Akitsu. Before she leaves, Akitsu explains to Homura why she has a master and tells him that she envies him because he can still be winged. Right after, just as Homura is about to destroy himself rather than be captured and winged, Minato and the other arrive. Musubi defeats one of Higa's Sekirei, Kazehana battles Uzume and Tsukiumi battles Higa's other Sekirei. Homura tries to kill himself again, but is stopped by Minato and winged. The other Sekirei and Ashikabi retreat and the unconscious Homura is brought home to Izumo Inn. Nursed by both Minato and Miya, Homura begins to recover and to also come to terms with his new relationship with Minato.
19	7	"A Faraway Tale"; Transliteration: "Tōi Monogatari" (Japanese: 遠イ物語)	August 15, 2010
Relieved that Homura has now recovered, Minato asks Matsu to explain the history of the Sekirei so he can further understand what is going on. Along with Musubi, Kusano and Tsukiumi (with Miya, Kazehana and Homura eavesdropping), Matsu tells Minato the story of Minaka and Takami finding the vessel from space containing the Sekirei and founding MBI. Since the Sekirei Plan has reached a standstill, Minaka sends a message to all Ashikabi: "All Ashikabi who still have yet to get something in this game, are no longer recognized as having the desire to participate in the game and all of the Sekirei in their possession will cease to function."
20	8	"Kusa's Play"; Transliteration: "Kusa no Yūgi" (Japanese: 草ノ遊戯)	August 22, 2010
While out shopping, Minato and Musubi are confronted by an Ashikabi and Sekirei, who ask him to help with a mass escape plan for Sekirei and Ashikabi. Because the Ashikabi mocked Minato's friend Shigi and Shigi's Sekirei Kuno, Minato refuses to help. MBI forces pursue the pair, along with Karasuba. Later on, a day with Minato becomes the stakes in a card game between Minato's Sekirei, with Kusano winning. On their way home the next day, she gets distracted by a cat and runs off. Following the cat to a hospital, she meets Chiho, Uzume's Ashikabi.
21	9	"A Multitude of Bonds"; Transliteration: "Amata no Kizuna" (Japanese: 数多ノ絆)	August 29, 2010
Kusano becomes friends with Chiho, but runs off when she hears Minato calling for her, leaving her stuffed bear behind. While out looking for Minato and Kusano, Tsukiumi witnesses an encounter between Yukari and Shina and Sekirei #84, Yashima, and her very abusive Ashikabi. Shina defeats Yashima, and Yukari's perverted behavior towards Tsukiumi scares her off. The next day, while at the hospital looking for Kusano's stuffed bear, Minato and his Sekirei run into Uzume and through her meet Chiho. Uzume lures Musubi and Tsukiumi outside and reveals herself as their enemy, the Veiled Sekirei. Meanwhile, Minato overhears a phone conversation between Kakizaki and his employer Higa and, realizing the truth about Uzume, races to warn his Sekirei.
22	10	"Far-Reaching Sky"; Transliteration: "Hatsuru Sora" (Japanese: 果ツル空)	September 5, 2010
Uzume challenges both Tsukiumi and Musubi as part of her obligations to Higa in order to keep Chiho alive. Musubi steps up to the challenge, and she and Uzume fight to a draw. Kakizaki sends in two more Sekirei, but Kagari and Kazehana arrive to even the odds. One of Higa's Sekirei tries to impale Musubi, but Uzume throws herself on top of Musubi and takes the fatal blow. Before her Termination, Uzume begs Minato to save Chiho. Minato and the Sekirei privately mourn Uzume. Chiho's condition began to deteriorate, leading to a confrontation between Minato and Higa.
23	11	"Preparations for the Festival"; Transliteration: "Matsuri no Junbi" (Japanese: 祭ノ準備)	September 12, 2010
Minato asks Takami for help to cure Chiho after secretly receiving data from Higa that can only stabilize her condition, but she refuses (supposedly as an act of "tough love"). However, Minaka decided to use the situation as part of the Sekirei Plan and contacts Minato, telling him that he (Minaka) will provide Chiho's cure...if Minato can get a certain place by a certain time. He them notifies all remaining active Sekirei and Ashikabi to take out Minato and his Sekirei. The next day, Minato, Musubi, Tsukiumi and Kazehana make their way to the MBI Tower, while Matsu leads Kusano and Homura to infiltrate the tower via the botanical gardens and seize the server room. Minato's group is surrounded by Ashikabis and Sekireis, but Sanada (the Western Ashikabi) decides to fight another Ashikabi for insulting and hitting him, setting off a major free-for-all and giving Minato and the others the opportunity to slip away and reach the Tower. In the botanical gardens, Matsu's group is ambushed by Sekirei led by Mikogami.
24	12	"Tower of Confusion"; Transliteration: "Rangi no Tō" (Japanese: 乱戯ノ塔)	September 19, 2010
Minato and his Sekirei find that they have to reach the top of the MBI Tower by a certain time to get the data for the antidote to help cure Chiho of her condition. Minaka hinders the team by activating anti-personnel traps and deploying the Disciplinary Squad to attack Minato's Sekirei before announcing the activation of hidden explosive charges throughout the building. This forces Minato and Musubi to run harder towards the upper floors of the MBI Tower while Tsukiumi and Kazehana remain behind to separately fight off Benitsubasa and Haihane. Outside, Homura's controlled fire attacks drive off Mikogami's Sekirei, while Matsu and Kusano try to reach the server room, barely managing to avoid a sword-to-sword confrontation between former original Disciplinary Squad members Karasuba and Mikogami's Mutsu (Sekirei #05).
25	13	"Bonds of Truth"; Transliteration: "Shinjitsu no Kizuna" (Japanese: 真実ノ絆)	September 26, 2010
Seo aids Matsu in securing MBI data for Higa while Minato and Musubi confront Minaka, who gives them the needed data before he escapes in a rocket pod, leaving the MBI Tower as it is destroyed. Minato and his Sekirei manage to escape, but not without injury. Karasuba appears and engages Musubi after threatening to kill Minato's other Sekirei. Using her Norito, Musubi is able to hold off Karasuba, but her power fades and although injured the others confront Karasuba. Since their combined powers could possibly defeat her, Karasuba withdraws. With the tower destroyed (and a new one being planned), everyone begins to return to their normal lives. Higa finds that the data Seo supposedly stole from MBI for him is fake; thanks to Minaka's data Chiho is successfully cured; and Minaka, originally trapped in his orbiting escape pod, regains control and vows to return.
OVA–2	OVA	"Two Gossip Topics"; Transliteration: "Kanwa Ni Dai" (Japanese: 閑話弐題)	July 21, 2010 (3 minutes, Limited edition); August 21, 2010 (28 minutes, BD/DVD edition)
These stories take place between Seasons One and Two. 1) All of the Sekirei are required to take their measurements for Diagnostics Day, which leads to some amusing situations; 2) Both Minato and Seo are invited to a private beach and spa exclusive for all Sekirei and their Ashikabi. In both occasions, Benitsubasa demolishes both the examination room and the bathhouse out of frustration at being ridiculed for her Size-A chest. Also, it is noted that Homura had pondered upon choosing between the male and female entrances for both of these events; however, because Benitsubasa destroys both buildings Homura no longer has to choose. The episode ends with several of the characters telling of the new second season and asked what they want the show to have.
