= List of Cat Planet Cuties characters =

This is a list of characters from the light novel and anime series Cat Planet Cuties.

== Characters ==
=== Main characters ===
Kio Kakazu (嘉和 騎央, Kakazu Kio)
Voiced by: Yuuko Sanpei (drama CD), Mutsumi Tamura (anime) (Japanese); Aaron Dismuke (English)
Kio is a kindhearted, yet sophisticated 16-year-old boy. Kio is easily able to accept the proof that his new friend is an alien, and that both his other friends are secret agents. He knows how to handle firearms, though he is not sure what business his Uncle Yuichi is in to have them. He displays a strong sense of justice, and is willing to take action when he feels it is needed. This sense, and his treatment of others, draws the attention of his female friends. He is unsure about his reaction to all that interest, and their attention begins to cause complications for Kio. Eris the Catian, in particular, has decided that she wishes to be his mate as she is about to come into her first heat. In the final episode of the anime, he temporarily transforms into a catboy.
Eris (エリス, Erisu)
Voiced by: Ayako Kawasumi (drama CD), Kanae Itō (anime) (Japanese); Tia Ballard (English)
Eris is a 16-year-old scout for the Catian people exploring Earth. Tall and well endowed, she has easily befriended many people, as well as regular cats she has met on Earth. Initially most do not believe her to be an alien, but she shows Kio the proof directly with her technology, ears, and tail. While she is learning the ways of Earth, she is also a competent fighter who employs strategies and technologies not seen on Earth. Her interactions with Kio are closer and more emotional, potentially due to the fact she is 16 and about to enter her first heat. With the kindness and interest he has shown, she has selected him as a mate. Eris was forced to take chemicals to end her first heat prematurely as it was causing disruption to her duties as an ambassador and representative of Catians on Earth, with high expectations for her second heat and another chance to mate with Kio. She develops feelings for Kio after she found out he risked his life to save her when she was captured. When Aoi and later Manami both admits that they were jealous of her closeness to Kio, Eris says she would go with the Catian law that places no restriction on the number of lovers rather, so they can all fall in love with Kio, instead of following earthling law that says a person can have only one mate. Eris, Aoi and Manami eventually kisses Kio in the anime adaptation's final episode. With that, she did not bear any ill will towards Aoi or Manami and is happy that they both share the same feelings as she does.
Aoi Futaba (双葉 アオイ, Futaba Aoi)
Voiced by: Mamiko Noto (drama CD), Kana Hanazawa (anime) (Japanese); Monica Rial (English)
Aoi is a teenage girl who worked for the Immigration Bureau of Japan as one of their top agents before helping save Eris. She is now seen as a traitor so she lives at the Catian Embassy under its diplomatic immunity. She has the ability to teleport objects to her that lie within a 50m radius. Because of this ability her parents left her to grow up on what she states is "the other side of society". She also makes use of a technologically advanced battlesuit and weaponry, (unknowingly provided by the Dogisians). She has a noticeable crush on Kio due to the fact he is the only person who ever treated her like a normal girl, but feels he would not like her due to her ability and is too shy to attempt any of the ideas Manami suggest to "get him" (such as suggesting pushing him to the ground and giving him a big kiss). In the anime, she drives a blue Ford Shelby GT500 KR equipped with hidden gadgets such as a smokescreen and capture net. Due to Manami's suggestion, she changes her way of addressing Kio, from "Kakazu-kun" to "Kio-kun" (which in Japan signifies that one is close to a person). Aoi and Manami later get into a big argument when the latter pushes Aoi to telling Kio how she feels because she doesn't want her to lose him to Eris, but Aoi deduces that she's in love with Kio too, and accuses her of being a coward for hiding her feelings away for her sake. Eris manages to resolve this dispute by revealing that according to Catian's law, they could all be Kio's lovers instead of choosing one or the other. Aoi, along with Manami and Eris, kisses Kio in the anime adaptation's final episode.
Manami Kinjou (金武城 真奈美, Kinjō Manami)
Voiced by: Megumi Toyoguchi (drama CD), Haruka Tomatsu (anime) (Japanese); Brittney Karbowski (English)
Manami is a tomboy, childhood friend, and next door neighbor of Kio. Since she was young she wanted to join the CIA, where her room is filled with listening equipment and guns. She was in the CIA recruitment program operating under the supervisor codenamed JACK, but thinks that she is no longer a candidate after helping rescue Eris. She also lives at the Catian Embassy under its diplomatic immunity. She has feelings for Kio, but believes he sees her as just one of the guys and that she "let her chance slip by", so she roots for Aoi to get him before "that alien steals him away". She wears a watch with a scratch on it, which it got the day she realized she was in love with Kio; she will often rub the scratch when nervous. She has a noticeable fascination with guns, to the point where Kio refers to her as a gun otaku. She is often very pushy when it comes to helping Aoi make progress with her relationship with Kio, because she does not wish to see Aoi's chance to slip by as she believes hers has. However, they end up fighting over it when Aoi confronts her that she's in love with Kio, but is too scared to act on her true feelings. During the final episode, she eventually admits her love for Kio, but believes she can't compete with Eris, blaming her for stealing Kio away from her ever since she came into his life and she only pushed Aoi so she could have a chance with Kio, but feels her actions pushed him away. After learning her true feelings, Eris reveals that due to Catian law they could all be Kio's lovers, Manami, along with Aoi and Eris kisses Kio in the anime adaptation's final episode, confirming her feelings for him.

=== Recurring characters ===
==== Humans ====
JACK (ジャック, Jakku)
Voiced by: Yukiko Monden (Japanese); Jamie Marchi (English)
Despite the name, JACK is actually a woman. Her real name is: Janis Alectos Carotenas Karinato. She works for the CIA and is acting supervisor of Manami. She has noticeably long blond hair, is barely dressed (usually seen wearing a cowboy hat, denim shorts with a belt, cowboy boots, and a tank top) and is often seen eating fast food, appealing to the Japanese stereotype of American women. She drives a 1963 Chevrolet Corvette Stingray as her personal vehicle.
Maki Itokazu (糸嘉州 マキ, Itokazu Maki)
Voiced by: Saeko Chiba (drama CD), Hiromi Hirata (anime) (Japanese); Martha Harms (English)
Maki is Kio's teacher and leader of Beautiful Contact Japan Sect. Due to the fact that Eris does not represent the stereotypical alien (tentacles, green skin, etc), she firmly believes that Eris, despite the obvious, is not really an alien. Even after the public meeting between the Earth and the Catians, Maki still holds to her beliefs that aliens are supposed to look like those found in movies, manga and other sci-fi media.
Yuichi Miyagi (宮城 雄一, Miyagi Yūichi)
Voiced by: Ryotaro Okiayu (drama CD), Fumihiko Tachiki (anime) (Japanese); Sonny Strait (English)
Yuichi is Kio's uncle. He seems to be involved with movie industry, though he also displays some skills with firearms.
Antonia Morfenoss (アントニア)
Voiced by: Ayaka Saito (drama CD), Iori Nomizu (anime) (Japanese); Luci Christian (English)
Antonia Lirimonie Norfedras Papanorgas Arecroteles Cnorses Morfenoss is a wealthy 12-year-old, leader of the Underside of Kitten Paw cult and rarely seen without wearing a pair of cat ears. She grows attached to Kio in the last episode due to him becoming a cat boy.
Sara (サラ, Sara)
Voiced by: Yuko Sato (drama CD), Akeno Watanabe (anime) (Japanese); Clarine Harp (English)
Sara is one of Antonia's personal maids. She has short, blonde hair and an eyepatch over her right eye. She has an undeniable weakness toward anything cute and catlike and forms an attachment toward one of Eris' Assist-A-Roids. Apparently, it was because of this weakness that she was unable to maintain her former job as a mercenary soldier.
Maya (摩耶, Maya)
Voiced by: Sanae Kobayashi (drama CD), Sayori Ishizuka (anime) (Japanese); Kristi Kang (English)
Maya is another one of Antonia's personal maids. She had long, reddish hair and a small scar on her lower-left cheek. Not much is known about her, but she apparently has some connections with the KGB as she was able to procure ICBMs to be made into a spacecraft.
Aiko Ishimine (石嶺愛子, Ishimine Aiko)
Voiced by: Eri Sendai (Japanese); Madeleine Broseh (English)
Aiko is one of Kio's classmates and a member of the film club.
Arisa Oshiro (大城アリサ, Ōshiro Arisa)
Voiced by: Mai Aizawa (Japanese); Kara Edwards (English)
Arisa is another one of Kio's classmates and a member of the film club.
Souken Nakamura (中村宗弦, Nakamura Sōken)
Voiced by: Keigo Manaka (Japanese); Josh Grelle (English)
Souken is another one of Kio's classmates and the president of the film club.
Satoshi Fukuhara (普久原聡, Fukuhara Satoshi)
Voiced by: Yuta Kasuya (Japanese); Orion Pitts (English)
Satoshi is another one of Kio's classmates and a member of the film club.

==== Catia ====
Qoone (クーネ, Kūne)
Voiced by: Eri Nakao (drama CD), Kikuko Inoue (anime) (Japanese); Anastasia Muñoz (English)
Qoone is the Catian Starship captain. She is in charge of the contingent responsible for establishing diplomatic relations with Earth's leaders.
Melwin (メルウィン, Meruwin)
Voiced by: Yuka Iguchi (drama CD), Aki Toyosaki (anime) (Japanese); Lara Woodhull (English)
Melwin is the Catian Starship First Officer.
Chayka (チャイカ, Chaika)
Voiced by: Reiko Takagi (drama CD), Minako Kotobuki (anime) (Japanese); Cherami Leigh (English)
Chayka is a member of the Catian Starship Crew. She stands guard over the Catian Embassy whenever Eris and company are out.
Durel (デュレル, Dureru)
Voiced by: Shizuka Ito (drama CD), Naomi Shindō (anime) (Japanese); Aleisha Force (English)
Durel is the Catian Starship Doctor. Her personality is reminiscent of Star Trek's Mr. Spock as she views things in a calm, rational, and logical manner. Her comment about Eris being fortunate in having a partner (Kio) for her first heat leads to Manami becoming extremely flustered and jealous.
Luros (ルーロス, Rūrosu)
Voiced by: Iori Nomizu (Japanese); Majken Bullard (English)
Luros is the computer AI of Eris' personal ship and is able to fly on her own. Her outer shell was later destroyed in a Dogesian attack, though her computer core escaped intact. Her outer shell was presumably rebuilt after the crisis was over.

==== Dogisia ====
Janes (ジェンス, Jensu)
Voiced by: Akeno Watanabe (drama CD), Yui Horie (anime) (Japanese); Colleen Clinkenbeard (English)
Janes is a Dogisian in charge of the underground relations between her home planet and governments through Earth. After knowing about the arrival of Catians on the planet, she devises schemes to prevent establishment of official diplomatic relations between them, including trying to eliminate Eris and her friends.

==== Other characters ====
Ichika (いちか, Ichika)
Voiced by: Tomoko Kawakami (drama CD), Ayahi Takagaki (anime) (Japanese); Lindsay Seidel (English)
Ichika appeared for the first time in episode 7. She's shown to have some sort of connection with Jen and the Dogisians. Furthermore she can use power cards to improve abilities, whether they are hers or of someone else. In the post-credits scene of the anime adaptation's final episode, it is revealed that she is a "sage" Catian and discusses other lifeforms over the phone to an unidentified male.
Lawry (ラウリィ, Raurī)
Voiced by: Minori Chihara (Japanese); Caitlin Glass (English)
Lawry is the first Catian Assist-a-roid. Unlike the current models, she is modeled after the Catians themselves and appears more like an android. After her master had died during the first attempt to reach Earth 1,000 years earlier, she comes to the planet in order to fulfill his final wish and ceases to function soon after.
Matrey (マットレイ, Mattorei)
Voiced by: Hironori Kondō (Japanese); Jason Douglas (English)
Matrey is Janes's personal dog-like assist-a-roid. Its appearance and laughter are an homage to Muttley.
Narrator
Voiced by: Ayahi Takagaki (Japanese); Cynthia Cranz (English)
Assistroids
Assistroids are small, anthropomorphic robots used by both the Catians and the Dogisians. The Catian versions are considered more advanced with their own self-repair systems, while the Dogisian assist-a-roids must steal electronic equipment to repair themselves. With the exception of Matrey, the Dogisian assistroids are considered expendable. The Catian assist-a-roids can be personalized to suit their owners. Kio is given an assistroid named Sarokichi that is modeled after a movie director. Aoi is given a pair named Chiba and Nakamura that resemble samurai, while Manami has a gun-wielding, gangster-looking one named Yun-Fat, a nod to Hong Kong Action Movie Star Chow Yun Fat.

== Factions ==
Catia (キャーティア, Kyātia)
An alien race. They look and speak just like humans, except they have cat ears and tails. They currently are using Kio's house as their Embassy. Due to their society reaching its apex 70,000 years ago, (having done everything possible on their planet), they interact with other species for new experiences. Since males of their race are exceedingly rare, Catian Law does allow for polygamous couplings. Catians go into periods of extreme sexual behavior or mating seasons, with their first time at age 16. Normally they have stimulus devices to satisfy their desire to procreate, though Eris wishes to have Kio as her mate.
Dogisia (ドギーシュア, Dogīshua)
Another alien race similar to the Catians, except they have dog ears and tails. They seem to be bitter enemies, similar to a relationship of a cat and dog. They had arrived on Earth a while before the Catians, but kept their arrival in secret and made connections with the various military organizations, including Japan. Their main goal is to prevent any collaborations between Earth and the Catians, as they would lose control. Furthermore, due to a total embargo placed on their planet to interact with other species, they are technically not supposed to be on Earth and are illegally trading advanced weaponry.
Orsonians (オルソニア人, Orusoniajin)
A highly evolved society of aliens that compose the Universal Regulations Government. They are considered extremely powerful and oversee the interactions between other races. They forbid attempts at conquest and have placed an embargo on Dogisia, thereby preventing them from making any public contact with other species.
Beautiful Contact
A terrorist group dedicated to the welcoming of the first intergalactic species to Earth. However, they are very particular about what they wish the aliens to look like. When they saw Eris they felt she was unacceptable for the human race's first alien encounter and planned to get rid of her before her presence became public knowledge. Maki Itokazu is the leader of the Japanese sect. With the Catians later making public interactions and peace treaty negotiations with the Japanese Government, the group's main goals are no longer valid.
Intelligence Agencies
Some of the US intelligence agencies are represented in the series, including the CIA, DIA. Manami aspires to join the CIA.
Underside of Kitten Paw (子猫の足裏, Koneko no Ashiura)
A large, nearly worldwide cult dedicated to worshipping cat ears and cat tails. It is led by Antonia. They considered Eris to be their Savior and Goddess. By the eighth episode, Eris and Antonia began work to slowly secularize the group into more of a fan club. The people of Dogisia are against this organization due to their relationship with Catia and the fact that they represent a huge financial asset.
