= Tia Ballard =

American voice actress

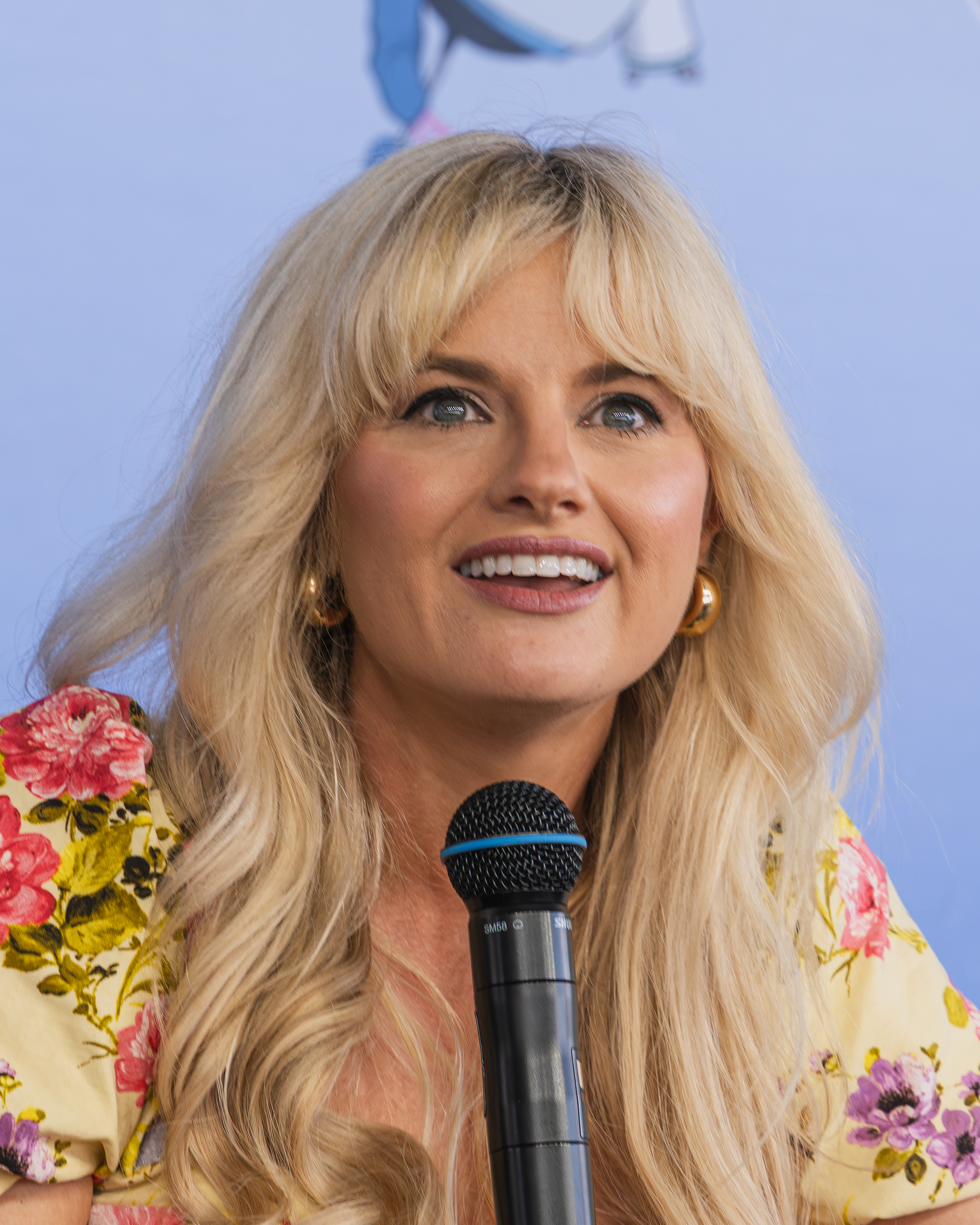
- Ballard at GalaxyCon Nashville in 2026
- Born: 1985 or 1986 (age 40–41); Paris, Texas, U.S.
- Other names: Abigail Hartman; Mikala Vallemo
- Education: Paris Junior College
- Occupations: Voice actress; ADR director
- Years active: 2009–present

Tia Lynn Ballard (born 1985 or 1986) is an American voice actress and ADR director. Some of her notable roles are Kusano in Sekirei, Mizore Shirayuki in Rosario + Vampire, Rin Ogata in Rideback, Happy in Fairy Tail, Eris in Cat Planet Cuties, Nanami Momozono in Kamisama Kiss, Kokomi Teruhashi in The Disastrous Life of Saiki K., Zero Two in Darling in the Franxx, Itsuki Nakano in The Quintessential Quintuplets and Yashiro Nene in Toilet-Bound Hanako-kun.

== Biography ==
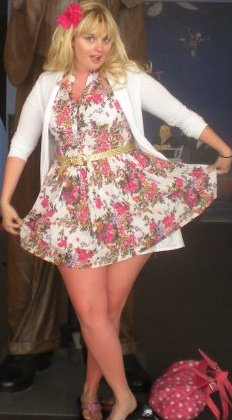
Ballard in 2010

Ballard was born and grew up in Paris, Texas. She developed an interest in voice acting when she attended a local anime convention, seeing the panel of voice actors, and learned that Funimation was only two hours from her hometown. While attending Paris Junior College, she was a participant in the Disney College Program, after which she changed her major to theatre. Ballard graduated in 2006 with an associate degree in theatre and art.

Ballard's first voice acting gig was at Funimation where she worked with Monica Rial. She played Young Asim in Dragonaut: The Resonance. She later had a larger role as Rachel Calvin in Linebarrels of Iron.

Outside of voice acting, Ballard has co-created a Super Mario Bros.-themed online comic called Koopasta.

== Filmography ==
=== Anime ===
List of voice performances in anime
Year	Title	Role	Notes	Source
2008	Rosario + Vampire series	Mizore Shirayuki		
2010–12	Sekirei	Kusano		
2010	Rin: Daughters of Nmenosyne	Ruon Kamiyama		
2010	Strike Witches	Amaki Suwa		
2011	Chaos;Head	Young Takumi		
2011	Rideback	Rin Ogata		
2011	Fullmetal Alchemist: Brotherhood	Shao May, Young Trisha Elric		
2011–19	Fairy Tail	Happy		
2012	Cat Planet Cuties	Eris		
2012	Tenchi Muyo! War on Geminar	Maria Nanadan		
2012	Shiki	Megumi Shimizu		
2012	Freezing	Elizabeth Mably, Ticy Phenyl	As Abigail Hartman	
2012–present	One Piece	Porche, Carrot		
2013	Shangri-La	Tomoka Yamazaki		
2013	Last Exile: Fam, the Silver Wing	Alvis Hamilton		
2013	Sankarea: Undying Love	Rea Sanka		
2013	Maken-ki! series	Inaho Kushiya		
2013	Little Busters!	Komari Kamikita		
2013	Aquarion Evol	Sazanka Bianca		
2013–18	High School DxD	Serafall Leviathan		
2014–15	Kamisama Kiss series	Nanami Momozono		
2014	Attack on Titan	Hannah Diamant	Also Junior High	
2014–present	Date A Live series	Yoshino		
2014	WIXOSS series	Hitoe Uemura	Assistant ADR director	
2014	Karneval	Eleska		
2014–present	The Devil Is a Part-Timer!	Chiho Sasaki		
2014–16	Log Horizon series	Nureha		
2015	Blood Blockade Battlefront	Aligula		
2015	Ben-To	Ume Shiraume		
2015	World Break: Aria of Curse for a Holy Swordsman	Maya Shimon		
2015	D-Frag!	Takao		
2015	Hyperdimension Neptunia: The Animation	Peashy	Replacing Sandy Fox	
2015	Gangsta	Arthur		
2015	Ultimate Otaku Teacher	Kotaro Araki		
2015	Prison School	Mari Kurihara		
2015	Sky Wizards Academy	Misora Whitale		
2015	Seraph of the End	Taichi Hyakuya	Eps. 1–3, 10	
2015–18	Free!	Chigusa Hanamura		
2016	Lord Marksman and Vanadis	Titta	Assistant ADR co-director	
2016	No-Rin	Natsumi "Becky" Bekki		
2016	Dimension W	Mana Ayukawa	Ep. 6	
2016	Black Butler: Book of Circus	Beast		
2016	And You Thought There Is Never a Girl Online?	Nanako Akiyama / Sette		
2016	Aokana - Four Rhythms Across the Blue	Reiko Satoin		
2016	Rage of Bahamut: Genesis	Amira		
2016	Garo: The Animation	Garm	Assistant ADR director	
2016	Gonna be the Twin-Tail!!	Mega Neptune Mk. II		
2016	Puzzle & Dragons X	Devi		
2016	The Disastrous Life of Saiki K.	Kokomi Teruhashi		
2016	Alderamin on the Sky	Hisha	Ep. 9	
2016	Love Live! Sunshine!!	—N/a	ADR script writer	
2016	Orange	Rio Ueda	Ep. 3	
2016	Danganronpa 3: The End of Hope's Peak High School: Future Arc	Daisaku Bandai		
2016	Monster Hunter Stories: Ride On	Avinia		
2016	Kiss Him, Not Me	—N/a	ADR director Script writer	
2016	Castle Town Dandelion	Aoi Sakurada		
2016	Chaos Dragon	Kōkaku		
2016	Aquarion Logos	Shoko Iwagami		
2016	My Love Story!!	Rinko Yamato		
2017	Dragon Ball Z Kai	Marron		
2017	Dragon Ball Super	Marron, Caway		
2017	Hand Shakers	Tazuna's Mother		
2017	Fuuka	Tomomi		
2017–26	The Saga of Tanya the Evil	Mary Sioux		
2017	Chaos;Child	Yui Tachibana		
2017	WorldEnd	Phyracorlybia-Dorio		
2017	Masamune-kun's Revenge	Sonoka Kaneko	Ep. 1	
2017	Myriad Colors Phantom World	Kurumi Kumamakura		
2017	Chain Chronicle: The Light of Haecceitas	Pirika	ADR director	
2017	The Royal Tutor	—N/a	ADR director	
2017	Convenience Store Boy Friends	Kokono Minowa		
2017	Alice & Zoroku	Sanae Kashimura		
2017	Sakura Quest	Shiori Shinomiya		
2017	KanColle: Kantai Collection	Akagi		
2017	In Another World with My Smartphone	Ellen Urnea Ortlinde	ADR director	
2017	Juni Taisen: Zodiac War	—N/a	Assistant ADR director (Ep. 4)	
2017	Gamers!	Aguri		
2017	New Game	Hajime Shinoda		
2017	A Centaur's Life	Michi Inukai		
2017–21	Black Clover	Sylph (Bell)		
2017	Konohana Kitan	Iori (Weaving Girl)		
2017	Urahara	Sayumi		
2018	Magical Girl Spec-Ops Asuka	Abby		
2018	Darling in the Franxx	Code:002 / Zero Two		
2018	Overlord	Entoma Vasilissa Zeta		
2018	Bloom Into You	Yuu Koito		
2018	Harukana Receive	Haruka		
2018	Space Battleship Tiramisu	PAC2-AR		
2018	UQ Holder!	Shinobu Yuuki, Misa Kakizaki		
2018–24	My Hero Academia	Tomoko Shiretoko / Ragdoll		
2018	Kakuriyo: Bed and Breakfast for Spirits	—N/a	Co-ADR director	
2018	Magical Girl Raising Project	Sister Nana		
2018	The Master of Ragnarok & Blesser of Einherjar	Efil, Epheria		
2018	B't X	J'Taime	2018 dub	
2018	Lord of Vermilion: The Crimson King	Julia Ichijo		
2018	Cardcaptor Sakura: Clear Card	Fanren Li		
2018–present	That Time I Got Reincarnated as a Slime	Shuna		
2018	Zombie Land Saga	—N/a	Assistant ADR director	
2019	The Quintessential Quintuplets	Itsuki Nakano		
2019	My Roommate Is a Cat	—N/a	Assistant ADR director (Ep. 9)	
2019–21	Fruits Basket (2019)	Kagura Sohma		
2019	Kono Oto Tomare! Sounds of Life	—N/a	ADR director	
2019	Nichijou	—N/a	Assistant ADR director	
2019–present	Arifureta: From Commonplace to World's Strongest	Yue		
2019	Cautious Hero: The Hero Is Overpowered but Overly Cautious	Tiana	Assistant ADR director	
2019	Azur Lane	Laffey		
2019	Kemono Michi	—N/a	Assistant ADR director	
2020	Bofuri	Kasumi		
2020	ID - Invaded	Muku		
2020	Kaguya-sama: Love Is War	Tsubame Koyasu		
2020	Darwin's Game	Rein		
2020	Toilet-Bound Hanako-kun	Nene Yashiro		
2020	Grisaia: Phantom Trigger	Izumi Yamamoto		
2020	Uzaki-chan Wants to Hang Out!	—N/a	ADR director As Mikala Vallemo	
2020	Warlords of Sigrdrifa	Sonoka Watarai		
2020	Our Last Crusade or the Rise of a New World	Shanorotte Gregory		
2021	Wave, Listen to Me!	Mizuho Nanba		
2021	Sakura Wars the Animation	Komachi Oba		
2021	Wandering Witch: The Journey of Elaina	Selena		
2021	Full Dive	Melissa	Ep. 5	
2021	Edens Zero	Happy, Icchi		
2021	The Case Study of Vanitas	Naenia		
2021	Sonny Boy	Mizuho		
2021	Banished from the Hero's Party	Ruti		
2021	Irina: The Vampire Cosmonaut	Irina		
2021	Rumble Garanndoll	Musashi		
2022	Akebi's Sailor Uniform	Kao		
2022	Aharen-san Is Indecipherable	Miyahira		
2022	Spy × Family	Karen	Episode: "Operation Strix"	
2022	Tsukimichi: Moonlit Fantasy	Emma		
2022	Shoot! Goal to the Future	Ayaka		
2022	The Slime Diaries: That Time I Got Reincarnated as a Slime	Shuna		
2022	Black Summoner	Melfina		
2023	Heavenly Delusion	Mimihime, Additional Voices	11 episodes	
2024	The Ancient Magus' Bride	Jade Ariel		
2024	Fairy Tail: 100 Years Quest	Happy		
2024	I'll Become a Villainess Who Goes Down in History	Layla		
2025	The Gorilla God's Go-To Girl	Sophia		
2025	Bogus Skill "Fruitmaster"	Flower Hat		
2025	Let This Grieving Soul Retire!	Tino		
2025	Gachiakuta	Cthoni Andor		
2026	Tune In to the Midnight Heart	Nene		
2026	The Daily Life of a Middle-Aged Online Shopper in Another World	Melissa		

=== Film ===
List of voice performances in direct-to-video, feature and television films
Year	Title	Role	Notes	Source
2010	Summer Wars	Kana Jinnouchi		
2012	Fullmetal Alchemist: The Sacred Star of Milos	Karina		
2012	Fafner in the Azure: Dead Aggressor: Heaven and Earth	Miwa Hino		
2012	Blood-C: The Last Dark	Hiro "Tsuki" Tsukiyama		
2012	Evangelion: 3.0 You Can (Not) Redo	Midori Kitakami		
2013	Shakugan no Shana: The Movie	Marianne		
2013	Fairy Tail the Movie: Phoenix Priestess	Happy		
2014	One Piece Film: Z	Young Z		
2015	Dragon Ball Z: Resurrection 'F'	Marron		
2016	Escaflowne	Sora		
2017	Fairy Tail: Dragon Cry	Happy		
2019	One Piece: Stampede	Porche		
2022	The Quintessential Quintuplets Movie	Itsuki Nakano		
2023	Black Clover: Sword of the Wizard King	Bell, Millie		

=== Video games ===
List of voice performances in video games
Year	Title	Role	Notes	Source
2010	Comic Jumper: The Adventures of Captain Smiley	Geisha Puppets, Hent High Students, "I Love U" (Vocals)		
2011	Monster Tale	Priscilla		
2012	Borderlands 2	Generic Female #3		
2015	Dragon Ball Xenoverse	Time Patroller		
2016	Street Fighter V	Jianyu, Telephone Voice, Marlowe		
2016	Dragon Ball Xenoverse 2	Time Patroller		
2017	Orcs Must Die! Unchained	Ivy		
2017	Akiba's Beat	Riyu Momose		
2018	Them's Fightin' Herds	Velvet		
2019	Borderlands 3	Killavolt Fangirl		
2020	Dragon Ball Z: Kakarot	Marron		
2021	Muv-Luv: Project Mikhail	Haruko Kashiwagi		
