= List of Sekirei characters =

The Sekirei manga features an extensive cast of characters created by Sakurako Gokurakuin. The story centers on Minato Sahashi, a rōnin (high school graduate trying to get into college), who becomes involved with Musubi, one of 108 Sekirei: super-powered humanoids (predominantly beautiful women) with unique powers who must fight in a battle royal called the Sekirei Plan. He becomes her Ashikabi, a human with special genes that allow him to activate a Sekirei's powers through "winging", which is performed via a mouth-to-mouth kiss. Minato soon leads a team of Sekirei residing at Izumo Inn, a boarding house in the northern district of Teito, and must face opponents in the form of other Sekirei, many of whom have teamed with other Ashikabi and are spread throughout the other districts of Teito. Overseeing the Plan is a corporation called Mid Bio Informatics (MBI). New Sekirei and characters are also introduced in the media adaptations including the anime series and the video game series. Sekirei characters have had mixed reception among the Japanese and international anime communities.

== Main characters ==
The protagonists are residents of Izumo Inn (出雲荘, Izumo-sō), a boarding house in the northern sector of Teito built by Takehito Asama and Kaoru Seo or people/Sekirei closely connected with them. Miya Asama is the current owner and landlady.

=== Minato Sahashi ===
Minato Sahashi's Sekireis (from left to right): Musubi, Matsu, Homura, Kazehana, Kusano, and Tsukiumi.

Voiced by: Shinnosuke Tachibana (Japanese); Joel McDonald (English)

Minato Sahashi (佐橋 皆人, Sahashi Minato) is a high school graduate who has failed the college entrance exams twice. His known family consists of: his mother Takami, his grandmother (whom Minato's mother stated could live another 100 years) and his younger sister Yukari. After meeting Musubi at the start of the series, he becomes an Ashikabi.^{Ch. 0} Over the course of the story, he "wings" several Sekirei and they share a residence in Izumo Inn where he has his own room. Originally he has a passive and somewhat cowardly personality, but over time, due to the kindness, trust and love of his Sekirei and his desire to protect them, he becomes more confident. He often places himself in danger to protect his Sekirei from harm and avoids situations that pose a high risk of danger to prevent his Sekirei from fighting needlessly. Although many of his Ashikabi peers consider these actions cowardly, Minato finds that these traits endear his Sekirei to him even more. It is later revealed that Hiroto Minaka, MBI's chairman and founder, is Minato's natural father.^{Ch. 100, 102}

Minato has "winged" six Sekirei, each of whom physically reacted to him prior to winging, with the first five actively choosing him as their Ashikabi. Musubi, Kusano and Matsu were winged in the game's "First Stage", and Tsukiumi, Kazehana and Homura were winged in the "Second Stage", earning him recognition as the strongest Ashikabi in the northern part of the city. Because of this (and as a result of his living at the "Northern Hannya"'s location and therefore being seen as "allied" with her), he received the title "Northern Ashikabi" (北の葦牙, Kita no Ashikabi), with few using his given name as a result of Minato being mistakenly described as an Ashikabi with a "shady" background. Many individuals think that Minato is somehow the key to foiling MBI's ultimate plans for the Sekirei. By the end of the Third Stage, Minato is seen with some advantages against the other remaining contestants as he is the only Ashikabi with two Jinki in his possession, one having been stolen by Matsu and the other won in battle, and for having winged the most single-numbered Sekirei, totaling four (not including Musubi who inherited the powers of Yume, another single number), while receiving guidance from Matsu and Miya (who, despite not participating in the Sekirei Plan, is known as the strongest Sekirei of all). During the final stage, Minato is the Ashikabi representing them in the final match on Kouten to save all Sekirei and their Ashikabi. He and Musubi journey to Kouten to fight Miya for the prize; the rest of his Sekirei join their life-forces with Musubi, enabling Musubi to defeat Miya. After the final battle, Musubi becomes the new Guardian of Kouten and Minato must return without her. In the year that follows, Minato finally passes the entrance examination to the university, has a part-time job at MBI (now run by his mother Takami in Minaka's absence) and is determined to learn as much about Sekirei as he can in order to "destroy this system binding these Sekirei and remove the leash on these girls." In Sekirei - 365 Days Without Her, he states his intention to finish college in possibly two years and one day "take over MBI". He continues to live at Izumo Inn with his other Sekirei, finally reuniting with Musubi. In Sekirei - 365 Days Without Her's epilogue, which takes place a few years after Musubi's return, he has become the new Director of "the New Sekirei Project" at MBI and is responsible for Takehito Asama's revival and reunion with Miya.

=== Musubi ===
Voiced by: Ayako Kawasumi (Drama CD), Saori Hayami (Anime) (Japanese); Alexis Tipton (English)

Musubi (結; Sekirei #88) is the main heroine of the series. She met Minato when she literally fell out of the sky onto him while being chased by Hikari and Hibiki. Musubi specializes in hand-to-hand combat which utilizes her greatly enhanced strength, reinforced by the heavy combat gloves she always wears. Musubi's outfit consists of a short red skirt and upper clothing resembling the robe traditionally worn by mikos (possibly passed on to her from Yume). She is quite naive, often saying things she doesn't understand, and is the most innocent of Minato's Sekirei (even more so than Kusano), yet at times can be insightful (even if she herself doesn't realize it). Musubi is the most "competitive" of Minato's Sekirei, often showing great eagerness to fight other Sekirei, but never fails to be polite, usually introducing herself and then asking for permission first before fighting them. Two running gags in the story are how her clothing always ends up in tatters, and how she seems unable to land on her feet after leaping from a great height but always crash-lands on top of Minato. After hearing Tsukiumi say that she is Minato's wife, she decides that she is his wife too.^{Ch. 24} She eats a lot and is a fairly decent cook (but only curry in large amounts). Because Musubi eats so much food to maintain her energy level, Miya's nickname for Musubi is "Airheaded Glutton".^{Ch. 54} During moments of extreme emotion (such as anger or jealousy), the image of a ferocious black bear appears behind her, causing some (mostly Benitsubasa) to refer to her as "The Bear". Musubi's known attacks are the Bear Fist (熊拳, Kuma-ken) ^{Ch. 66} and Bear Meteor (熊拳, Kuma Ryūsei) ^{Ch. 87} and her Norito is "By the fists of my contract, shatter the perils of my Ashikabi!" After all the Ashikabi collapse on Kamikura Island, Musubi is chosen from among Minato's Sekirei to represent them in the final fight on Kouten against Miya in order to save all the Sekirei and their Ashikabi. After accomplishing this, she stays to become the new controller of Kouten in order to restore all of the fallen Sekirei, but her "bear" side still emerges at moments of extreme jealousy whenever any of Minato's adult Sekirei get too close. She returns to Minato's side a year later.

=== Kusano ===
Voiced by: Yukari Tamura (Drama CD), Kana Hanazawa (Anime) (Japanese); Tia Ballard (English)

Kusano (草野; Sekirei #108), commonly referred to as "Kuu-chan" or "Ku", is the youngest of Minato's Sekirei, and is also known as the "Green Girl" (緑の少女, Midori no Shōjo) by other Sekirei due to her having the power to control plants, making them grow at an accelerated rate and to unnaturally large proportions, and typically using them to ensnare or disable her opponents without hurting them. At the beginning of the story, she was hiding in a Arboretum after being traumatized by Mikogami's attempting to forcibly wing her. Kusano communicated with Minato telepathically and led him through the garden until he found her. Kusano refers to Minato as Onii-chan (big brother), and is the most attached to him. She does not like fighting or quarreling and she can be seen stopping them when they start. She is also very impressionable and often copies Musubi, Tsukiumi and Kazehana's mannerisms. She is extremely determined to be Minato's wife when she grows up, and is highly possessive of him at times, even hissing at her fellow Sekirei when they start to get too close to him ^{Ch. 30} (and on occasion biting Minato himself when she thinks he is paying more attention to others of his Sekirei). Her Norito is: "By the life of my contract, awaken the stars of my Ashikabi!" In Sekirei: 365 Days Without Her, Matsu states that Kusano grows and ages at a slower rate than other Sekirei and estimates that "her life span will be twice that of a human."

At the Final Match of Stage Three on board the ship Minaka, she becomes good friends with Sanada's Sekirei Kujika, Kuzuri and Shijime^{Ch. 119} and now she is considered their best friend.

Kusano's use of various plants is highly imaginative and extremely effective, but her MBI adjustments were never completed, which is why her powers rage out of control whenever she's sad or upset. She has a sibling-like relationship with #107 Shiina, despite the fact that his power is the natural opposite of hers. When Minato initially brought her to Izumo Inn, Miya, believing that he had kidnapped her, drew and pointed a sword at Minato's face (a detail not used in the anime); however, Kusano's growling stomach and later falling asleep at the dinner table brought out her motherly instincts, and Miya insists that Kusano share her room to ensure (per her wicked sense of humor) that Minato doesn't do anything indecent with Kusano; however, Kusano often sneaks into Minato's room to share his futon with him and any of his other Sekirei who have done likewise. Her name literally means "A Grass Field", and Miya's nickname for Kusano is "Little Foster Daughter".^{Ch. 54} In the epilogue of Sekirei and in Sekirei - 365 Days Without Her, it is shown that she has taken on a large share of the household duties in tandem with Tsukiumi in Miya's place.

=== Matsu ===
Voiced by: Yuki Matsuoka (Drama CD), Aya Endo (Anime) (Japanese); Colleen Clinkenbeard (English)

Matsu (松; Sekirei #02) is a bespectacled Sekirei with long braided red hair wearing a light peach dress that closely resembles a cheongsam. Matsu has the power to access and analyze any electronic device on a telepathic level,^{Ch. 72} but does not yet have the power to control them.^{Ch. 73} Matsu has genius-level computer and hacking skills, and utilizes a vast network of satellites and spying devices to gather large amounts of information, once even succeeding in hacking MBI's mainframe computer;^{Ch. 17, 21} in Episode 10 of the anime's 2nd season after Uzume's "termination", when Minato asks her to force a meeting between himself and Higa (the Eastern Ashikabi), she goes wild on her computer terminal and unleashes a complex viral attack on the Higa Corporation's mainframe and stock market value. Matsu refers to herself as the "Sekirei of Perceptiveness" and addresses everyone using the "-tan" suffix (i.e. Minato→Mina-tan). However, in sharp contrast to her high intellect, Matsu is very perverted, often using her resources to peep on people and often tries to "experiment" (implicit sexual acts) with Minato, ^{Ch. 16} with most calling her the "Shameless" Sekirei or "the pervert" as a result. One of her favorite hobbies is watching the daily "soap opera" at Izumo Inn, i.e. the mayhem Minato and his other Sekirei cause every day. Matsu serves as Minato's strategist and tactician, using her vast network of information to aid him but rarely venturing outside of the Inn. Her name literally means "Pine" and Miya's nickname for her is "Perverted Four-Eyes".^{Ch. 54}

Prior to the beginning of the story, Matsu was a member of the first Disciplinary Squad led by Miya. ^{Ch. 71} Later, she stole Jinki #8, leading her to live in a secret room at Izumo Inn to avoid being captured by MBI.^{Ch. 79} Her Jinki (numbered #2) was a prize for the winner of the second match of the Third Stage, and ended up in the hands of the Eastern Ashikabi after the winner was attacked.^{Ch. 80}

=== Tsukiumi ===
Voiced by: Rie Tanaka (Drama CD), Marina Inoue (Anime) (Japanese); Lydia Mackay (English)

Tsukiumi (月海; Sekirei #09) is a Sekirei with a tsundere personality and a Western appearance who first appeared to Minato in a dream saying that she would kill him.^{Ch. 19} She is a statuesque blonde woman wearing a black and white dress and brown boots over black thigh-high stockings with brown garters. Tsukiumi's initial resentment is a result of her desire to be the strongest without the need to be winged by an Ashikabi. She was originally under the false belief that "winging" means having sex with an Ashikabi; this misunderstanding is cleared up after the two finally meet and she decides to become his Sekirei.^{Ch. 23}. Her unusual views on this subject are explained in Sekirei: 365 Days Without Her, when she tells Minato that she was traumatized by nearly being sexually molested after running away from her modifier Professor Miyajima when she was a child. The most aggressive of Minato's Sekirei, she refers to herself as Minato's "true wife" and is very possessive of him; she is also very quick to nearly drown Minato over trifling matters. Tsukiumi has a very short temper and rarely smiles; she does, however, have an honorable side, and is a strong adherent to the fundamental rule that Sekirei combat is one-on-one. She also goes to great lengths to prevent innocent civilians or bystanders from getting caught up in Sekirei fights. Tsukiumi's speech differs from the other Sekirei in Minato's party, as she speaks old-style Japanese; this was mirrored in the English dub of the anime by having her speak Shakespearian English. Minato's feelings for her are quite complex: he tells her at one point that to him she is "so beautiful, so strong, so stylish...[he] thought that you were too good for someone pathetic like me" and that he's "working hard to become an Ashikabi...a person worthy of you".^{Ch. 136}

In the beginning of the series, Tsukiumi has a one-sided rivalry with Homura stemming from her defeat by him when they first met. Homura always refuses a rematch, saying that she should be concentrating on finding her Ashikabi. Since being winged by Minato, Tsukiumi looks forward to a rematch with Homura.^{Ch. 14} Tsukiumi once confided to Miya that she still wants to be the strongest, but now it's so she can be with Minato forever.^{Ch. 36} After Musubi's ascension to Kouten and Miya's physical collapse, she takes over most of the household duties at Izumo Inn under the title of "bride training".

Tsukiumi has the ability to control and manipulate water, as well as the ability to gather large quantities of water out of the air. Her name literally means "Moon Sea" (not to be confused with lunar mare (月の海, Tsuki no Umi)), and Miya's nickname for Tsukiumi is "Faucet with Legs".^{Ch. 54} Her known attacks are Yamata no Orochi (ヤマタノオロチ; "Eight-Headed Snake"), ^{Ch. 66} Water Arrow (水の矢, Mizu no Ya), ^{Ch. 47} Hydra Blast, ^{Ch. 46} Water Blade (水ノ劔, Mizu no Tsurugi), ^{Ch. 46} Water Celebration (水祝, Mizu Iwai), ^{Ch. 37} Water Dragon (水龍, Suiryū), ^{Ch. 32} and Steam Dragon (with Homura).^{Ch. 87} Her Norito is "By the waters of my contract, purify the ills of my Ashikabi!"

=== Kazehana ===
Voiced by: Yukana (Japanese); Kelly McHalen (English)

Kazehana (風花; Sekirei #03) is a tall, dark-haired and buxom Sekirei who wears a tight-fitting and revealing purple dress with a hemline that ends just below the tops of her thighs (Miya's nickname for Kazehana is "Obscene Exhibitionist"^{Ch. 54}). Her first encounter with Minato was to stumble into his room and bed in a drunken stupor. She takes an immediate interest in Minato, surmising that he could be Hiroto Minaka's son because Minato possesses the same hand shape and cheek bones, but keeps this belief to herself. Despite experiencing physical reactions to Minato, Kazehana initially keeps her distance, hoping that Minato will display some "manliness". After witnessing Minato's concern and love for his Sekirei, Kazehana chooses him as her Ashikabi.^{Ch. 50}

Kazehana displays an extremely relaxed personality, preferring to spend most of her time lounging and drinking sake, and often becomes giddy when discussing matters of love. However, when she becomes serious she displays a lot of power, is a skilled fighter and lets nobody (with the exception of Minaka and Miya) talk down to her. Kazehana knew Uzume's secret, and while she didn't condone Uzume's actions she understood Uzume's motivations (love for her Ashikabi).^{Ch. 67} Along with Matsu, Kazehana was a member of the First Disciplinary Squad.^{Ch. 71, pages 15-16} Prior to meeting Minato, she had an unrequited love for Minaka, but was rejected because he loved someone else.^{Ch. 50} Her relationship with Miya is complex (it appears that Miya is the only one able to keep Kazehana in line), and she falls into a serious depression after Miya's collapse, which is lightened when Minato promises her that he will find a way to reunite Miya and Takehito.^{Ch. 186}

Kazehana has the ability to control and manipulate wind, which also grants her a limited ability of flight; her name literally means "Wind Flower". Her Jinki (numbered #3) was a prize for the winner of the third match of the Third Stage and ended up in Minato's hands (his second Jinki). ^{Ch. 95} Her known attacks are Flower Whirlwind (花旋風, Hana Senpū), ^{Ch. 72} Flower Dance (花の舞, Hana no Mae), Flower Feast (花宴), Long Sword of Wind (風の大刀, Kaze no Tachi),^{Ch. 106} and Cherry Flower (花桜), and her Norito is "By the wind of the contract, blow away the dark clouds of my Ashikabi!"

=== Homura ===
Voiced by: Hiromi Hirata (Drama CD), Yuki Kaida (Japanese); Leah Clark (English)

Homura (焔; Sekirei #06) was the self-titled "Sekirei Guardian" who protected unwinged Sekirei during the first two stages (this mission was given to him by Takami), usually from Hikari and Hibiki.^{Ch. 0, page a13} Prior to being winged, Homura's power and gender were unstable. Even after his body started becoming female (called "feminization" in the manga), Homura continued to think and act as a man.

For a long time, Homura lived under the alias Kagari (篝) and worked as a host club entertainer in an effort to find a "female Ashikabi" and few knew his real identity. Homura began reacting to Minato just before Kazehana became his fifth Sekirei, but it became more obvious afterward. This caused Homura a great deal of stress over his potential Ashikabi being a male.^{Ch. 18} At the end of the Second Stage, it was revealed that he was the last unwinged Sekirei.^{Ch. 60} Homura left the Inn to kill Minaka in order to bring an end to the Sekirei Plan; however, before he could reach the MBI Tower he was attacked by multiple Sekirei attempting to capture him. Refusing to be a trophy in Minaka's "Game", Homura attempted to commit suicide through self-immolation just before Minato and his Sekirei arrived.^{Ch. 64} Refusing to let Homura sacrifice himself, Minato winged him, saving his life and causing his power to finally stabilize. As a result, Minato received the power to determine Homura's gender and mentality, but chose to let Homura remain who he is and what he wanted to be, earning Homura's respect.^{Ch. 68} After the final battle, Homura, due to his/her hermaphroditic body, is no longer a "host", and is instead a part-time bartender at a small bar (where he is as popular as ever with the female clientele even though he no longer dates them); he is also once again the Sekirei Guardian, but is at peace with himself to the point where he is finally able to tell Minato that he (Minato) really is Homura's chosen Ashikabi.^{Ch. 186}

Homura has the ability to control and manipulate fire and has a habit of smoking when anxious (he lights his cigarettes with his own power). He is quite powerful, as Tsukiumi speculates him to be the strongest unwinged Sekirei prior to being winged by Minato. His name literally means "flame", referring to his element, and his known attacks are Fire Dragon (炎龍, Enryū), Steam Dragon (スチームドラゴン, Suchīmu Doragon; with Tsukiumi),^{Ch. 87} Sword of Flame (炎の剣, Honoo no Tsurugi),^{Ch. 106} Fire Snake (蛇炎, Jaen), and Fire Wall (炎の壁, En no Yan). His Norito is "By the flames of my contract, incinerate the karma of my Ashikabi!"

=== Miya Asama ===
Voiced by: Sayaka Ohara (Japanese); Monica Rial (English)

Miya Asama (浅間 美哉, Asama Miya; Sekirei #00, renumbered #01) is the landlady of Izumo Inn and the eldest Sekirei. Takehito, her (possibly common-law) husband, worked at MBI as one of the chief researchers, but was killed. She also stated that she left MBI due to the events that caused his death. She states she never refuses anyone needing shelter; however, she prohibits fighting and obscenity in her house, although she passively does eavesdropping using a rubber duck speaker with glasses and a #2 on its forehead that she refers to as "Duck-san" (made by Matsu). Currently, only Kusano, Matsu, Kazehana and Homura know of Duck-san, but they have all been "warned" (i.e. threatened) by her not to tell the others of it. She trains both Musubi and Tsukiumi to help them win Sekirei battles. Whenever she becomes angry, annoyed, if any person breaks the house rules or when she is making threats, a demonic visage appears behind her, frightening enough to scare even Homura and Tsukiumi into submission; it is possible that she learned this technique from seeing Takehito doing it first, which made her smile at him for the first time. She is the only Sekirei who was never winged because Takehito, the man she loved, wasn't an Ashikabi.^{Ch. 139} It is shown in a flashback that Seo interrupted her just before she was about to kiss Takehito while he was napping and possibly had interrupted at other times too, which would explain why she despises him. However, because he was Takehito's friend and had taught her household skills (such as cooking delicious food), she tolerates him and allows him to visit, eat free meals and sponge off supplies. Minaka hasn't tried to get her winged due to honoring a last request by Takehito (also, he might be too scared to trifle with her or Izumo Inn for fear of her wrath).

It is strongly implied that Miya is the strongest Sekirei, even referred to by #4 Karasuba as "another dimension". Miya was the leader of the First Disciplinary Squad (known as the "S-Plan Guardians") and displayed the power to sink several large warships. She is a swordswoman of unrivaled skill, with the ability to produce powerful directed shock waves with a swing of her sword. Due to her fearsome reputation, which has earned her the title "Northern Hannya" (北の般若, Kita no Hannya), no Ashikabi or Sekirei has dared to attack Izumo Inn (at least, not when she is there). She firmly conceals her true identity and past from others, with only members of the First Disciplinary Squad and Homura knowing the truth before she shares her secret with Minato. When Minato originally asked about Sekirei #01, Miya cryptically responded by saying that "she" died along with Takehito. Her Jinki (numbered #1) was a prize for the winner of the first match of the Third Stage and it is currently in the hands of the Southern Ashikabi. During the last stage, Miya reappears at the top of Kouten as the final opponent of the Sekirei Plan, claiming that the winners of the Last Stage, i.e. Minato and Musubi, can only obtain the prize by proving themselves in combat and defeating her. She is defeated by Musubi (thanks to Minato's other Sekirei joining their life-forces with her) and replaced by Musubi as the Guardian of Kouten. She returns to Izumo Inn, but because of the severing of her long-term connection with Kouten she is an invalid and still unwinged; however, her old personality is temporarily re-asserted by a burst of energy from Kouten to prevent a violent quarrel over Minato between Musubi and Kazehana. Minato hopes that one day he will be able to revive Takehito so that Miya can be reunited with (and "winged" by) her "true" Ashikabi ... a dream he achieves a few years after Musubi's return, and Miya and Takehito are tearfully reunited.

=== Uzume ===
Voiced by: Yu Kobayashi (drama CD), Hitomi Nabatame (Japanese); Jamie Marchi (English)

Uzume (鈿女; Sekirei #10) is a Sekirei originally living at Izumo Inn when Minato and Musubi first arrived. Uzume's Ashikabi is Chiho Hidaka (日高 千穂, Hidaka Chiho) (see below). Uzume shows deep love towards Chiho, which is entirely reciprocated. After Minato and Musubi moved into Izumo Inn, Musubi shared the same bath with her, with Uzume seeing Musubi's Sekirei crest and revealing to her that she is also a Sekirei. This turned out to be a bad move, since Musubi was taught to immediately challenge another Sekirei as soon as she encounters one, and resulted in Musubi attacking first before Uzume managed to escape and find Minato; the "fight" was eventually broken up by Miya. Uzume has a large collection of costumes at the Inn, which she made herself and wore to entertain Chiho. Higa, who is using Chiho's medical treatment as leverage for Uzume's cooperation, blackmails her into using her powers to eliminate other Sekirei. She develops a friendly rivalry with Kazehana, whom Uzume refers to as "Nee-san" ("Big Sis").

Near the end of the Second Stage, Uzume leaves Izumo Inn, realizing she can no longer be friends with Minato's group. She unwillingly fights Minato and his Sekirei in the hunt for Sekirei #06 (Homura) and when she is forced to try and steal Minato's Jinki after the 3rd match in Phase Three she is visibly upset. She visits Chiho a few times after she leaves Izumo Inn, in tears because she is being forced to fight her friends. She is with Higa's Sekirei when they attack Izumo Inn in a second attempt to steal Minato's Jinki, but deserts her erst-while "comrades" after she learns of Minato's Sekirei's successful "rescue" of Chiho, and sacrifices herself in order to save Minato, getting stabbed in the back by Sekirei #31 (Sai) and eventually dying in Minato's arms; similarly in the anime, she sacrifices herself to save Musubi. In both the manga and anime, before her termination is complete she begs Minato to look after and protect Chiho, and Minato tearfully promises to do so. Her termination devastates Minato and his Sekirei but also motivates Minato to win the Sekirei Plan in order to restore her to life.^{Ch.111} Uzume's spirit appears idly sitting on the afterlife Izumo Inn's rooftop when Minato is temporarily "terminated" during the Kamikura Island battle and tells him he is not supposed to be there yet, questioning why Minato's Sekirei are letting their Ashikabi be in such a place. She also tells him that he can only bring one Sekirei to the final battle at Kouten.^{Ch.177} A year after the final battle, she is restored along with all of the other fallen Sekirei, but because of the long period of time she spent "terminated" she awakens without her memories. Minato's plan is to reunite Uzume with Chiho (who is coming to Izumo Inn after her complete cure), but Uzume prematurely sneaks out of the MBI facility and makes her own way to Izumo Inn (which Minato had told her about), where she and Chiho are joyfully reunited ^{Ch.184} and continue to happily live together.

Uzume fights using a costume composed of long strips of cloth, which also serves to hide her face and identity, earning her the nickname "The Veiled Sekirei" (比礼の鶺鴒, Hire no Sekirei). She is very swift in terms of fighting, being able to dodge continuous attacks from the likes of Musubi (though she still wasn't properly trained at the time) along with the other Sekirei she bested on Higa's orders. Uzume primarily uses her veil to increase the range of her attacks, giving her a tremendous advantage over many melee-type fighters, but is fairly useless against Sekirei with abilities of elemental manipulation like Kazehana and Tsukiumi. Her known attack is Shawl Lance (ショールランス, Shōru Ransu) and her Norito is "By the veil of my contract, destroy the nightmare of my Ashikabi!"

=== Chiho Hidaka ===
Chiho Hidaka (日高 千穂, Hidaka Chiho)
Voiced by: Sayori Ishizuka (Japanese); Kara Edwards (English)

A young girl staying at the Hiyamakai Hospital owned by Izumi Higa, who is suffering from an aggressive virus which she has apparently suffered from since early childhood or even birth and which will eventually kill her if it continues to spread. Her disease crippled her to the point where she had to be confined to bed, but on occasion she is allowed to move about in a wheelchair, and the medication that she takes merely prevents the spreading of the virus but doesn't heal her; this fact is used as leverage against Uzume by Higa, who continually threatens to discontinue Chiho's treatment if Uzume does not obey him.

Chiho is an orphan, her parents having been killed in an accident when she was very young, and she does not appear to have any close family. Her condition rendered her suicidal until she met Uzume, who encouraged her to continue living. In the manga, she met Uzume after illicitly sneaking out of her hospital room to watch the birds in a field next to the hospital, and initially mistook Uzume, who was newly on the run from MBI and hiding in the branches of a large tree, for a "pretty bird".^{Ch.99} After their initial conversation, during which Uzume became aware that her crest was reacting to Chiho, they met several more times, becoming each time more emotionally connected, until Uzume finally asked Chiho to bond with her and Chiho joyfully agreed and became her Ashikabi.^{Ch.99} In the anime, Chiho mistakenly thought Uzume was about to commit suicide by jumping off the hospital roof and tried to stop her, causing them both to fall; Uzume saved them both, but realized that Chiho was her destined Ashikabi and allowed Chiho to "wing" her. Chiho shows deep love towards Uzume and admits this openly, with her feelings being entirely reciprocated; she deeply cares for Uzume and admits this openly, revealing that she has romantic feelings for Uzume, but feels ashamed that due to her illness she can't do anything as an Ashikabi for Uzume.

Chiho had no idea that she was being used by Higa to force Uzume to work for him, and Uzume deliberately kept the truth hidden from her in order to protect her, stating multiple times that Chiho didn't need to know. However, Matsu uncovered the truth and Chiho's identity, and Minato and his Sekirei began a secret operation to rescue Chiho and free Uzume from Higa's control.^{Ch.105} Once she understood, Chiho willingly allowed herself to be transported to an MBI medical facility,^{Ch.106} where she remained until MBI was able to eventually completely cure her. Unfortunately, during the rescue operation, Uzume was terminated and Chiho, although far away, was aware of it, feeling and grieving at Uzume's termination.^{Ch. 107}

Minato's plan was to reunite Chiho with Uzume by bringing her to live at Izumo Inn after her complete cure (as Uzume has once hoped would happen); a year after the Final Battle, she was released from the facility and the revived Uzume prematurely sneaked out of the same facility on the same day, and both made their own way to Izumo Inn where they were joyfully reunited ^{Ch.184} and continue to happily live together. In Sekirei - 365 Days Without Her, it is suggested that she is talented at confectionery cooking and hopes to one day become a pâtissière.

=== Yukari Sahashi ===
Voiced by: Kana Asumi (Japanese); Jasmine Mendigo (English)

Yukari (Yukari Sahashi (佐橋 ユカリ, Sahashi Yukari)) is Minato's younger sister and a college student who is enrolled in Shinto Women's University. Unlike her older brother, Yukari has a very strong and confident personality and came to Tokyo to attend university and be closer to her mother and brother. She has a strong interest in handsome men, especially bishōnen; this interest, however, is mostly a result of her hidden feelings for Minato, whom she cares for deeply (although she'll never openly express or even admit to it). There are quite a few times when she displays an extremely perverted nature (such as wanting to fondle Musubi's chest every time they meet and [in the anime] Tsukiumi's). She is Shiina's Ashikabi and is helping him search for Kusano. Her forceful reputation and merciless attack style as well as a penchant for displaying a demonic facial visage have earned her the title of "Demon Ashikabi" (悪魔の葦牙, Akuma no Ashikabi). Together she and Shiina are known as the "most evil" pair and are the second-most feared after "the Northern Hannya", carrying a bounty of 1,000,000 Yen from a vengeful Ashikabi whose Sekirei had fought them and lost^{Ch. 25} ^{Ch. 47}. Yukari was later taken prisoner by Izumi Higa in order to use Shiina's power for himself.^{Ch. 70} Originally unaware of what Shiina was being made to do in her absence, she later escaped Higa's clutches by starting a fire in the room where she was being held and jumping through a smashed-open window before being rescued by Shiina, at which time she confessed her true feelings for him. During the final match of Stage Three, Yukari discovers that Minato is not only also an Ashikabi but also "the Northern Ashikabi" and that Kusano is his Sekirei (although at first she mistook him for a pedophile that was molesting Kusano and intended to kill him herself);^{Ch. 131} curiously, she once wished for such a pairing to occur, that Kusano would find an Ashikabi as kind and caring as her older brother. With the third stage ended, Yukari and Shiina opt out of the Plan and lie low to evade the Disciplinary Squad, who by that time have been ordered to terminate all Sekirei not qualified for the final stage, but she and Shiina return in Chapter 163 to defend the MBI headquarters from invasion by armed troops.

=== Shina ===
Voiced by: Sayori Ishizuka (Japanese); Maxey Whitehead (English)

Shina (Shiina (椎菜; Sekirei #107)) is Yukari's Sekirei. He is originally searching for Kusano, with whom he has a very close, sibling-like relationship, despite the fact that his power is the natural opposite of hers.^{Ch. 14} His power, while not officially named, allows him to emit an energy wave that instantly disintegrates most forms of matter, including metal, wood, fabric, and even human flesh to a limited degree. He met Yukari after he was attacked by Mikogami's Sekirei and was saved by her with assistance from Homura; later, he was finally "winged" by Yukari when Mikogami tried to force him to emerge. He shudders at the idea of almost being Mikogami's Sekirei and thinks of Yukari as a bright shining light in his life. Like Kusano, Shiina dislikes violence and has expressed extreme remorse for hurting Sekirei he has defeated. Due to the overwhelming power of his ability, he is called the "Death God Sekirei" (死神のセキレイ, Shinigami no Sekirei), and he and Yukari are ironically considered to be the "most evil pair" in the city. Shiina and Yukari's reputation and power have become so fearsome that they attract the attention of Izumi Higa, who encountered them shortly after they arrived in the North attempting to find the last unwinged Sekirei, hoping it would turn out to be Kusano (who, unknown to them, already had an Ashikabi in Minato), but was later revealed to be Kagari/Homura. Higa captured them and tried to coerce Shiina into working for him by making Shiina believe that Yukari loved Higa and not him, but they both escaped. His only known attack is World's End Garden (ワールド・エンド・ガーデン, Wārudo Endo Gādin) and his Norito is "By the corpse of my contract, rot away the cross of my Ashikabi." His name means "Chinquapin Greens", sharing the same plant motif with Kusano. He and Kusano finally are reunited during the Third Stage battle for the jinki^{Ch. 131} (with both Minato and Yukari shocked at finding out that they are both Ashikabis), and he and Yukari decide to quit the Sekirei Plan and escape.^{Ch. 133} In the course of his relationship with Yukari, he becomes less retiring and more of an equal with her, in effect becoming, in her view, "cool".

== Mid Bio Informatics ==
Mid Bio Informatics (MBI) is a powerful conglomerate founded by Hiroto Minaka, with their headquarters in Teito Tower (帝都塔, Teitō-tō).

=== Hiroto Minaka ===
Voiced by: Toshihiko Seki (Japanese); Chuck Huber (English)

Hiroto Minaka (御中 広人, Minaka Hiroto) is the eccentric chairman and founder of MBI, with his motto being: "Fight & fight until one is left". He, along with Takami, discovered the Sekirei and because of this, he feels that this entitles him to be the "Game Master" of the Sekirei Plan. Takami states that he has always been thought of as a "super genius", but her own view is that he is deranged, and his actions throughout the story seem to support this. It is hinted by Seo that he might have had something to do with Takehito's death, or at the very least did nothing to prevent it (although this is not the case, as Takehito sacrificed himself saving MBI and the unreleased Sekirei, which Minaka was helpless to prevent). In chapter 100 of the manga, it is revealed that Minaka is the illegitimate father of Minato (and of Yukari in chapter 102), but only because Takami refuses to allow him into her family. In the final stage, Hiroto is revealed to be an Ashikabi too, using his powers to fill the quota of Ashikabi needed to activate the Jinki before all the others die, by taking Minato's second Jinki with him. However, he apparently has not winged any Sekirei. During the final battle, he is aboard the Sekirei Ark when he is knocked unconscious; he is utterly disconsolate when he wakes up and finds out that the game has finished without his having seen it, and he remains in total seclusion and completely incommunicado aboard the ship on Kamikura Island for an entire year, leaving Takami totally in charge of MBI operations. In the final chapter, he finally snaps out of his funk, completely repairs the Ark's systems and pilots the ship to Kouten, where he is able to release Musubi (using the Ark's jinki to take over her duties as controller) so she can return to Minato. A few years later, he works with Minato to revive Takehito.

=== Takami Sahashi ===
Voiced by: Miki Itō (Japanese); Shelley Calene-Black (English)

Takami Sahashi (佐橋 高美, Sahashi Takami) is the mother of Minato and Yukari, MBI's head researcher, and the person in charge of the Sekirei Plan. Before the beginning of the series, Takami, along with Hiroto, discovers the Sekirei Ark and later gives birth to Minato and Yukari out of wedlock with Minaka due to her refusal to allow Minaka to be part of their family. She later reveals that she lied about working at a pharmaceutical company to Minato when she takes him in temporary custody after the escape plan. Whenever she is angry or making jokes, she makes a demonic facial visage, a trait that is shared with Yukari. She is also the modifier of Homura (together with Takehito), Musubi, Shiina and Kusano, possibly out of shame as she frequently expresses doubt and disgust at Hiroto for what he is doing. She has a long scar over her left eye, received from Yomi while trying to protect Kusano. Her relationship with her children is somewhat unclear, as Minoto says that when he and Yukari were younger Takami was always busy at her job and never around much, and she frequently gives him "tough love" most of the time, such as cutting down his allowance when he is moving from his old apartment and lecturing him over the phone, but there seems no doubt that she does care deeply for her children and it is possible that she has always seen great potential in Minato, as when just before Kusano's emergence she told Homura (with a faint smile) that she knew Kusano's Ashikabi better than anyone else^{Ch. 10} and her acceptance of Minato's decision to join MBI and learn everything about Sekirei so that he can one day free them all, although she warns him to never become like Minaka.^{Ch. 185}

=== Takehito Asama ===
Voiced by: Susumu Chiba (Japanese); John Burgmeier (English)

Takehito Asama (浅間 建人, Asama Takehito) is Miya's late husband who was friends with Seo. An MBI researcher, he was the discoverer of the winging system, the Norito, and the existence of the Ashikabi. Together with Takami, he was the adjuster of the First Disciplinary Squad, consisting of Miya, Matsu, Kazehana, Karasuba and Mutsu. He once confessed to Homura that he believed an Ashikabi's power is the power of fate. He was against Hiroto's idea of the Sekirei Plan. He also designed Izumo Inn, which Seo helped him build. It is implied by Miya that his death may have something to do with her leaving MBI. Takehito was the first to use a "Demonic Visage" while talking to Seo over the phone, which made Miya smile for the first time.

In the manga, it was revealed that Takehito died sacrificing himself to protect all the Sekirei from a failed experiment of the Jinki. Because Karasuba was the one who convinced Takehito to sacrifice himself, Miya blamed Takehito's death partially on Karasuba and nearly killed her, thus creating the tension between the two Sekirei. He remained in the MBI laboratory in a state of suspended animation, and Minato hopes that he will one day be able to revive Takehito so he can be reunited with Miya, which, with Minaka's assistance, he accomplishes a few years after Musubi's return (to Seo's shock).

=== Natsuo Ichinomiya ===
Voiced by: Kousuke Toriumi (Japanese); Anthony Bowling (English)

Natsuo Ichinomiya (壱ノ宮 夏朗, Ichinomiya Natsuo) is the Ashikabi of all three members of the third Disciplinary Squad and works as a clerk in MBI's pharmaceutical department. During the start of the escape plan, he was expecting something exciting; Karasuba stated he's never been wrong with his intuitions. During the Third Battle of Phase Three, He explains to Minato why it is forbidden for Sekirei to attack an Ashikabi and what will happen if an Ashikabi dies (but knows that Haihane and Benitsubasa would attack an Ashikabi regardless of the consequences); he then tells Minato that if he (Natsuo) were to be killed, it would eliminate the whole Disciplinary Squad. Natsuo appears to be a carefree person, and even his Sekirei say so, but this appears to be a front, as he had been considering suicide after his lover, a doctor, had volunteered to serve in a war zone and was killed. He changed his mind after meeting Karasuba and agreeing to become her Ashikabi, sensing that she shared the same internal emptiness as himself. After the third stage is completed, Minaka presents the last remaining Jinki to him for his services in enforcing the Sekirei Plan, thus qualifying him and his Sekirei for the fourth and final stage. During the final battle on Kamikura Island, thanks to the devotion of Benitsubasa and Haihane, he realizes that he is not so empty as he had thought and tries to make Karasuba realize this, but she rejects him and deliberately severs her connection with him. As of the events of the epilogue of Sekirei - 365 Days Without Her, he has found peace with himself (although he is still searching for evidence of his lover's death in the area where his lover had been killed) and hopes that Karasuba will allow herself to eventually be revived.

=== Professor Miyajima ===
Professor Miyajima, Tsukiumi's modifier, is the special advisor to MBI and, according to all accounts, is more of a mad scientist than Minaka. Tsukiumi came to live with her as a small child after a foiled kidnap attempt from MBI and refers to her as "baa-san" ("hag"), although in softer moments she calls her "Granny". She, like Miya and Takehito, can make a demonic facial visage and was extremely strict, making Tsukiumi tremble with fear every day, but although strict she cared deeply about her "precious tomboy" and continues to do so. She is very young-looking despite her age (stated to be 70), the result of MBI's technology. She made her first appearance in a flashback to Tsukiumi's childhood in the Special Chapter of Volume 9, in which Minato and his Sekirei asked Tsukiumi about her. It was originally hinted that she was Minato's grandmother due to her personality and age, but never verified and finally disproved in Sekirei - 365 Days Without Her when she invited Minato and Tsukiumi to visit her.

=== Disciplinary Squad ===
The members of the 3rd Disciplinary Squad, as "noted" by Minato. Background, from left to right: Benitsubasa, Karasuba, and Haihane.

The Disciplinary Squad (懲罰部隊, Chōbatsu Butai) is an elite group of Sekirei in charge of preventing any Sekirei or Ashikabi from withdrawing or escaping from the Sekirei Plan. The First Disciplinary Squad, known as the "S-Plan Guardians", was initially formed by the MBI from the first five awoken Sekirei to protect the Sekirei that had yet to mature and awaken from enemy forces. Miya was the group's leader, with Matsu, Kazehana, Karasuba, and Mutsu following her. After its break-up, the Second Disciplinary Squad was formed with Yume as the leader and Karasuba, with the same goals. After Yume's death, the Third (and current) Disciplinary Squad, consisting of Karasuba, Haihane and Benitsubasa and headed by Natsuo (the Ashikabi to all three), was formed. After Karasuba's defeat on Kamikura Island by Musubi and her self-imposed coma, Benitsubasa and Haihane were joined, at Minato's recommendation, by #87 Kaho and her Ashikabi Oosumi.

==== Current members ====
Karasuba (鴉羽; Sekirei #04)
Voiced by: Romi Park (Japanese); Christine Auten (English)
Known as the "Black Sekirei" (黒い鶺鴒, Kuroi Sekirei) and "MBI's dog" (M・B・Iの狗, MBI no Inu), Karasuba is the leader of the Third Disciplinary Squad, wielding a nodachi and the oldest active member. In the past, Karasuba was a member of the First Disciplinary Squad and was joined by Yume to form the Second Disciplinary Squad. It is later revealed that Karasuba wanted to fight and defeat Yume and, as a result, resents Yume for "disappearing" before the one-sided rivalry could be settled. ^{Ch. 52} This unsettled matter appears to have heavily influenced Karasuba's actions throughout the story. In the past, Karasuba seemed to bear a contempt for humans, deeming them an "unnecessary species", evidenced when she killed numerous soldiers during her mission to rescue Musubi; this outlook continues with the current storyline, though at a much lesser extent. She maintains a "friendly" relationship with Musubi (whom she calls "Mū-chan"), and the two have made a promise to be the last two Sekirei standing; however, because Yume had voluntarily given her Sekrei "core" to Musubi, Karasuba is obsessed with forcing Yume to emerge so that she can finally battle and kill her. Karasuba and Miya do not associate well with each other (Miya, who blames her for Takehito's death, refuses to allow her to even set foot in Izumo Inn) and tend to come close to fighting each other at the mere appearance of the other. Her name means "Raven Feather", and her Norito is "By the blade of my contract, exterminate the sworn enemies of my Ashikabi!"^{Ch. 147} Karasuba and Musubi have their long awaited face-off in the Final Stage of the Sekirei Fight, but Karasuba, who had been hoping to draw out Yume so that she can kill her, is almost shattered at learning that Yume and Musubi have permanently merged and therefore Yume effectively no longer exists. Accusing Minato and Musibi of "killing" Yume, she deliberately tears off her own Sekirei wings and severs her connection with her Ashikabi Natsuo. The battle ends with Musubi victorious and Karasuba believing that she has lost all reason to live, until Yume's spirit makes her realize that she still has a life to live. She is currently still in suspended animation at MBI Headquarters.
Haihane (灰翅; Sekirei #104)
Voiced by: Mitsuki Saiga (Japanese); Clarine Harp (English)
Known as the "Blue Sekirei" (蒼い鶺鴒, Aoi Sekirei), Haihane is a member of the third Discipline Squad, with her weapons being her gauntlets that have scythe-like claws for fingers. After her fight with Tsukiumi, she develops a hatred for her because she almost drowned (as she cannot swim). She wears a tattered kimono over her bandaged body, giving her a Grim Reaper-like appearance. She is also prone to laughing to the point that it hurts her stomach, and loves to tease Benitsubasa about her small breast size. She is also forgetful, once forgetting that she had her claws on while trying to block her ears, resulting in her stabbing herself in the head. She attacked Shigi, even though the rules say not to attack an Ashikabi. Her name means "Ash Feather" and her attacks are Zankako no Tsume ("Talons of Execution") and Seikei no Tsume ("Claws of Execution").
Benitsubasa (紅翼; Sekirei #105)
Voiced by: Shizuka Itō (Japanese); Anita Neukar (English)
Known as the "Red Sekirei" (緋い鶺鴒, Akai Sekirei), Benitsubasa is another member of the third Discipline Squad and the most aggressive and hotheaded of the three. Like Musubi, she is a hand-to-hand fighter, but as stated by Haihane they are complete opposites. After her fight with Yume (believing her to still be Musubi), she conceives a deep hatred for Musubi after she was almost thrown across the border (which was actually Yume's doing); she currently refers to Musubi as "The Bear" after having seen Musubi's "inner bear image" during the Third Match of Stage Three^{Ch. 91} and is determined to someday defeat her.^{Ch. 185} She has a habit of sticking her tongue out while fighting, and hates people she believes are stupid. She wears a kimono-like shirt with one sleeve missing and has pink hair in a side ponytail with two daisy clips. She also has an inferiority complex about her small breast size (Size A), which would often be the butt of Haihane's jokes (the fact that most of Minato's Sekirei are extremely busty doesn't help any and causes her to go berserk, as seen in the OVA). Out of the three Discipline Squad members, she is the only one who "loves" her Ashikabi, as she wants Natsuo to "open his eyes" (make him like women), then kill both Haihane and Karasuba so she can have him all to herself. Although the rules say not to attack Ashikabi, she attacked Minato because she thinks that "it'll be better to get rid of him". Her name means "Crimson Wings" and her attacks are Shock Wave, Pulverizer (粉☆砕), Gekishin (激☆震; "Extreme Quake"), and Blood Festival (血☆まつり, Chi Matsuri).

==== Former members ====
Yume (結女; Sekirei #08)
Voiced by: Saori Hayami (Japanese); Alexis Tipton (English)
Yume was the leader of the Second Disciplinary Squad, partnered with Karasuba in the past. ^{Ch. 72} She rescued Musubi and Kaho as children after they had been kidnapped and saved Musubi's life by giving her "Tama", the core which gives the Sekirei life and use their powers. Yume bears an uncanny resemblance to Musubi as seen in Karasuba's memories, and her original clothing is identical to Musubi's current outfit (she stated that upon joining the Disciplinary Squad, her clothing would be passed on to the next generation).^{Ch. 172} Yume refers to herself as the Sekirei of Fate (縁の鶺鴒, Enishi no Sekirei), and is a "Defender of Love". Yume possessed light-based powers used in conjunction with her super strength and hand-to-hand combat.
When Musubi lost her Sekirei crest fighting Benitsubasa, Yume's soul temporarily took control of her body, beat the Discipline Squad, and was able to restore Musubi's crest. In the anime, she asked Minato to "teach love to these little birds" (a reference to the Sekirei), and said that she was awakened by Minato's warm and gentle spirit. Her Jinki (numbered #8) was stolen by Matsu from the MBI and was handed to Minato later, ^{Ch. 79} with Homura currently holding it for him for the time being. When Minato holds her Jinki, he sees what he believes to be Musubi (in reality, Yume) in a revealing pose saying "I will always protect you". After, when Musubi and Minato were alone, Yume took over and explained it was "an ancient memory carved into your genes". Yume then tells Minato that she will always protect him before releasing her control. Her name (結女) means "Woman of Bonds", and Musubi (結, meaning 'union') inherited part of her name. Yume's Sekirei crest is unique, as it does not appear on her back, rather it appears on her exposed torso with her number on it. In the final battle between Musubi and Karasuba on Kamikura Island, Musubi reveals that she and Yume had finally merged and that Yume's personality is gone, which completely devastates Karasuba.

== South ==
=== Hayato Mikogami ===
Voiced by: Jun Fukuyama (Japanese); Todd Haberkorn (English)

Hayato Mikogami (御子上 隼人, Mikogami Hayato), the son of a mother who runs a large agency, is a 15-year-old Ashikabi controlling the southern part of the city. Until he met Mutsu (Sekirei #05, who became his first Sekirei), he was, while scholastically extremely advanced, emotionally a very lonely boy who had no interest in making friends with boys his own age. He is one of the more complex characters, with his personality being fairly different with each of his appearances. In his first appearance, he seemed to be very cruel, only caring about "winging" Kusano and calling Yomi useless after her termination, whereas in his second appearance he seemed easygoing and carefree. Like Tsukiumi, Mikogami also strongly follows the rules for the Sekirei Plan. Even though he does not personally like Minato for his Sekirei having terminated some of Mikogami's, he appeared with his Sekirei and chased off Uzume when she attempted to take the Jinki Minato won in the third match of the Third Stage. He made no attempt to take it from Minato either, stating that he will take it in a fair match. He enjoys the Sekirei Project for the game which Hiroto Minaka has made it, and when Higa sends his Sekirei to attack Izumo Inn he lectures Higa about his "grown-up" attitude; surprisingly, Higa listens and withdraws both himself and his remaining Sekirei from the fight (even though he does not like being lectured by a 13-year-old, referring to Mikogami as a "brat"). He seems to be a collector of rare items, like getting rare-ability Sekirei and getting all excited when the Jinki were called extremely valuable. He also shows that while he likes collecting Sekirei, he hates losing them, as when they are terminated they leave him, making him lonely, claiming that having Sekirei by his side is far more interesting than other humans. To that purpose, he states that his wish is to bring back #43 and #38, and make all the terminated Sekirei his. After the Game ends, he embarks on a world-wide journey with his Sekirei to learn more about them and discover more of their artifacts; he also seems to be on better terms with Minato, who understands that Mikogami, in his own way, loves his Sekirei.

=== Southern Sekirei ===
Mutsu (陸奥; Sekirei #05)
Voiced by: Daisuke Matsubara (Japanese); Robert Howard (English)
One of the few male Sekirei seen other than Shiina and Homura. He was once a member of the First Discipline Squad, but left for undisclosed reasons. Mutsu carries a sword with him as his weapon, but seldom draws it. The few times he has been in action, he has been shown to slam the butt of the scabbard to the ground, creating shockwaves and large fissures, suggesting that he may possess earth-based powers. His only attack shown is Hasaiten (破砕点; "Smashing Point"). Although at times he does wish he had been winged by a young, attractive female, there is no doubt he cares deeply about Mikogami.
Akitsu (秋津; numberless Sekirei, former Sekirei #07)
Voiced by: Yu Kobayashi (Japanese); Jenny Jaffe (English)
A "disused" Sekirei with the Sekirei crest appearing on her forehead instead of her back, with Homura referring to her as "Discarded Number". Like her power, Akitsu has a very cold and melancholic personality. She appears to be forgetful; at one point it was noticed she didn't wear any panties and while it was first assumed she was ordered to do so by Hayato, she later revealed it was simply because she forgot to put them on. A recent flashback chapter revealed that Akitsu was originally Sekirei #07, but her MBI modification failure, caused by a secondary MBI technician, resulting in her crest appearing on her forehead. Because of this, she can't be winged by an Ashikabi or use the Norito (it is useless from the MBI's point of view). Akitsu's power is very strong, allowing her to fight on par with Sekirei like Homura, whom she has encountered 3 times so far. Despite the fact that she can't be winged, she considers Mikogami her Ashikabi because he took her in, and she fears being thrown away again, later showing true loyalty in the final battle on Kamikura Island when he asks her to flee and abandon him for her own safety, refusing and staying to protect him instead. Mikogami proclaimed his love for her and she did likewise for him, making her Sekirei mark disappear from her forehead and causing her to become a true Sekirei, allowing him to finally wing her. Soon after she uses all her strength to eliminate three of Sanada's most violent Sekirei. Her name means "Autumn Port". Her norito is "By the ice of my pledge, shatter the misfortunes of my Ashikabi!"
Himeko (日姫子; Sekirei #15)
A Sekirei dressed in a kimono that made her debut in chapter 76 during the first round of the Third Stage. She is very compassionate, crying at the Thunder Twins' troubled life. She uses a large double-sided blade as a weapon.
Mitsuha (蜜羽; Sekirei #38)
A Sekirei that made her debut in chapter 13, chasing Shiina with Akitsu.^{Ch. 13} She uses a whip as her weapon, and threatens to take Homura to Mikogami to be winged when he prevents her from getting Shiina.^{Ch. 14} She was terminated by Karasuba/the Disciplinary Squad at some point before the Third Stage.^{Ch. 153}
Mitsuki (蜜姫; Sekirei #39)
A Sekirei that made her debut in chapter 76 during the first round of the Third Stage. She bears a striking resemblance to Mitsuha (#38), which even surprised Hikari and Hibiki when they first met. She uses multiple strings made by the MBI to constrict her opponents.
Taki (多姫; Sekirei #65)
Voiced by: Ao Takahashi (Japanese); Elizabeth Evans (English)
A Sekirei that made her debut in chapter 76 during the first round of the Third Stage. She has the power to create a smoke screen out of mist, causing confusion to her opponents. Her known attack is Kiri no Tobari (氷霧; "Curtain of Mist")
Yomi (夜見; Sekirei #43)
Voiced by: Kana Ueda (Japanese); Kristi Kang (English)
A Sekirei ordered by Mikogami to "retrieve" the "Green Girl" (Kusano). She was defeated by Musubi in the fight over Kusano at the arboretum, and lost her Sekirei crest. Homura refers to her as "Pest"^{Ch. 07} and Mikogami called her "useless" after her termination. She uses a surprisingly brittle death scythe as her weapon (Musibi easily snapped it during their fight), and can create a vacuum using a blade even with her scythe broken. She seems to have a rather perverted and sadistic nature, as demonstrated when she systematically strips Musubi's clothes off before becoming Musubi's first vanquished opponent, and when she mercilessly attacked Takami and injured her left eye when she first tried to acquire Kusano for her Ashikabi.^{Ch. 08}
Juuza (銃左; Sekirei #103)
A Sekirei who made her debut in Chapter 152. She wears a kimono, and carries a gun. She is terminated (along with Mitsuki) by Yune on Kamikura Island,^{Ch. 152} but is later resurrected by Kusano's norito. Her norito is "By the gun of my pledge, shoot down and kill the target of my Ashikabi".^{Ch. 175}
Momo (Sekirei #?)
A Sekirei who made her debut in Chapter 152. She was terminated by Chiyo on Kamikura Island,^{Ch. 152} but is later resurrected by Kusano's norito. Her norito is "By the dagger of my pledge, slaughter the enemy of my Ashikabi".^{Ch. 175}

== East ==
=== Izumi Higa ===
Voiced by: Takuma Takewaka (Season 1), Junichi Suwabe (Season 2) (Japanese); Jerry Jewell (English)
Izumi Higa (氷峨 泉, Higa Izumi) is the manipulative Ashikabi controlling the eastern part of the city. He is shown to be rather amoral, having no qualms about forcing other Sekirei into obeying him and turning them against each other with carefully constructed lies. His motives hint that he may be intending to take over MBI. He apparently doesn't tolerate his Sekirei disobeying him. He appears to be blackmailing Uzume, forcing her to do his bidding by holding her Ashikabi Chiho hostage. In addition, there are rumors suggesting that he has a large number of Sekireis at his disposal. Higa also has several Ashikabis (with their own respective Sekirei) that serve under him. At one time, Higa confronts Yukari and Shiina with several of his Sekirei and Ashikabi, incapacitating Shiina and taking Yukari prisoner, also asking her to marry him. When Yukari berates him for breaking the rules of the Sekirei Plan, Higa simply remarks that he has no interest in being associated with such a "farce".^{Ch. 70} He meets Minato during the third match of the Third Stage and asks him to join forces against the MBI, which Minato soon declines, with Higa stating that they're both "too stubborn" (referring to both Minato and Yukari). It is later revealed that he is the heir to a powerful rival pharmaceutical company competing against MBI, and that his family owns the hospital where Chiho is being treated.

=== Kakizaki ===
Voiced by: Kenji Takahashi (Japanese); Eric Vale (English)
Kakizaki (柿崎, Kakizaki) is a bespectacled man who serves as Higa's "secretary" and is also an Ashikabi. He attempts to claim Homura so that Higa can wing him and is accompanied by two of Higa's Sekirei. During the battle for Homura, Kakizaki is restrained by Kusano's vines. Kakizaki also serves as Uzume's "handler", relaying orders from Higa and continually reminding her that Chiho's life is at stake if she fails.

=== Eastern Sekirei ===
Kochou (胡蝶, Kochōu; Sekirei #22)
Kochou is Kakizaki's Sekirei.^{Ch. 134} In chapter 126, Homura hints that she possesses the same hacking ability as Matsu does, which is later confirmed during the second stage battles on Kamikura Island.

Higa's Sekirei include:

- Toyotama (豊玉; Sekirei #16) - She uses a spear as her weapon.^{[ch. 81,82]} In the anime, she assumes Sai's role of eliminating Uzume from the Sekirei Plan. Toyotama is voiced by Eimi Okada in Japanese and Maeghan Albach in English.
- Ichiya (壱哉; Sekirei #18) - ^{[ch. 81,82]} Ichiya is voiced by Tomoko Nakamura in Japanese and Anastasia Muñoz in English.
- Katsuragi (葛城; Sekirei #86) wears a tight-fitting leotard and speaks in a melancholic voice. She fights Musubi when the Sekirei try to acquire Homura for Higa, but is defeated by Musubi's Bear Fist, and loses her Sekirei crest. Katsuragi is voiced by Hisako Kanemoto in Japanese and Luci Christian in English.
- Kujo (九条, Kujō; Sekirei #??) appears in the third match of the Third Stage but is terminated by Homura.^{[ch. 88]}
- Oshino (Sekirei #85) is defeated by Benitsubasa with a single punch.^{Ch. 88}
- Oriha (織刃; Sekirei #101) speaks in a sing-song voice and fights using several bladed disks. She fights Tsukiumi when her group tries to acquire Homura for Higa. In the Third Stage, she is knocked down by Haihane but appears later to attack Minato.^{Ch. 93} She later faces Tsukiumi but loses to her Norito attack.^{Ch. 94} Her catchphrase is "These flying gears represent my pledge! Cut away the enemies before my Ashikabi!" Oriha is voiced by Yuka Iguchi in Japanese and Katie Caruso in English.
- Kaie (Sekirei #62) fights Kazehana in the attack against Maison Izumo during the Final Match.^{Ch. 127}
- Kaiha (Sekirei #??) first appears in chapter 127, fighting Homura during the attack against Maison Izumo during the Final Match,^{Ch. 127} and then is named in chapter 157, during the fight on Kamikura Island.^{Ch. 157} Her weapons are two huge blades.^{Ch. 127}
- Sai (紗緯; Sekirei #31) is one of the two who attack Izumo Inn during the rescue of Chiho.^{Ch. 104} She fights with a blade attached to a long thread.^{Ch. 106} Sai terminates Uzume when Uzume moves to prevent her from killing Minato.^{Ch. 106} Then she loses her crest, between the damage Homura did to her and the effort it took to throw her blade.^{Ch. 107}
- Shitodo (鵐; Sekirei #40) is the other who attacks Izumo Inn during the rescue of Chiho.^{Ch. 104} She fights using long, thick blades and is terminated by Kazehana during the fight.^{Ch. 106}
- ?? (Sekirei #79) is terminated by Tsukiumi during the rescue of Chiho; she is attacked so suddenly that she has no time to draw or even reveal her weapon.^{Ch. 105}
- ?? (Sekirei #??) is terminated by Tsukiumi during the rescue of Chiho; she uses tonfa.^{Ch. 105}

== West ==
=== Nishi Sanada ===
Voiced by: Kisho Taniyama (Japanese); Charles Baker (English)

Nishi Sanada (真田 西, Sanada Nishi) is the Ashikabi controlling the western part of the city. His first name literally means "West" and it is his real name, not a nickname. ^{Ch. 76} Despite his rough appearance, he is shown to be overly emotional and protective around his Sekirei almost to the point of embarrassment. His appearance and personality are similar to that of Seo's and their similarities resulted in them getting into a comical fist fight during the first match of the Third Stage, after which they gained some respect for each other. He manages to secure one Jinki during the final match of the Third Stage, thus qualifying him and his Sekirei for the Final Stage. He rides a motorcycle. He's also nineteen years old, according to Mikogami's sources ^{Ch. 152} - the same age as Minato.

=== Western Sekirei ===
Kujika (くじか; Sekirei #48)
Voiced by: Hilary Couch (English)
A dark-skinned Sekirei with blonde hair wearing a leather swimsuit with two white stars on her bra. She debuts in chapter seventy-four.
Kuzuri (くずり; Sekirei #??)
Voiced by: Madeleine Broseh (English)
A dark-skinned Sekirei with dark hair. She debuts in chapter seventy-five during the first round of the stage three battle of the Sekirei Plan.
Shijime (しじめ; Sekirei #106)
Voiced by: Lindsay Seidel (English)
A Sekirei mentioned in chapter 77 as "that child" by Kujika and Kuzuri and the third Sekirei in Sanada's party.^{Ch. 77}

During the Fourth Match of Stage Three on board the ship Minaka, Kujika, Kuzuri and Shijime become good friends with Kusano ^{Ch. 119} and now consider her their best friend.

Chiyo (Sekirei #14)
Wielding a scythe, she is a Sekirei kept concealed by Sanada until the Final Round. She fights with a vicious and bloody demeanor, much to her Ashikabi's chagrin.
Yuna (Sekirei #17)
Wielding a whip, she is a Sekirei kept concealed by Sanada until the Final Round. Just like Chiyo, her bloodlust is a source of concern for him.
Hatae (Sekirei #20)
Wielding short blades, she is the third of Sanada's secret Sekirei and is just as vicious as the other two.

== Other characters ==
Kaoru Seo (瀬尾 香, Seo Kaoru)
Voiced by: Nakai Kazuya (drama CD), Katsuyuki Konishi (Japanese); Ian Sinclair (English)
Seo is the Ashikabi of Hikari and Hibiki. He was Takehito Asama's friend.^{Ch. 21} Miya apparently has a very low opinion of him, easily referring to him as "trash" or "scum" right in front of his face; a perfect example of why is the fact that shortly after winging both Hibari and Hibiki he blew all of the money in their MBI Cash Card (a total of 10,000,000 yen) mostly on buying information but also on gambling.^{Ch. 149} He works as a freelancer, whose motto is "We'll solve your problem for a price", and also takes various odd jobs and manual labor. He detests how MBI works and its CEO (Minaka) and sometimes eats for free at Izumo Inn when he is low on money (for which his Sekirei constantly apologize). Seo has a gruff, wild look, but he is a very good man to rely on. He has a special "ability" given to him (against his will) by Takehito,^{Ch. 22, 74, 150} the cancellation of a Sekirei's abilities, as shown during his encounter with Tsukiumi^{Ch. 22} and during his meeting with Sanada; we learn later that he doesn't actually need physical contact with the Sekirei to use his power, during the Final Match of the Third Stage.^{Ch. 122} While Seo is aware that Minato is an Ashikabi, he makes no aggressive action against him and they remain on friendly terms, with Seo saying "I liked you from the start" for some reason. He is able to tell the number of Sekirei a person has by his "strong nose", which may be an element of the power.^{Ch. 21} He mentioned that he built Matsu's secret room for Takehito.^{Ch. 21} Seo is the one who finds the last remaining Jinki thus ending the Third Stage, qualifying him and his Sekirei for the Final Stage. However, Seo and his Sekirei end up against Musubi, Tsukiumi and Matsu in the first match, but, as part of Matsu's plan, they are hurled off the island by Musubi to a nearby MBI observation boat, thus disqualifying them from the Sekirei Fight. After the final battle, he proves that Ashikabis and Sekireis are inter-fertile as he becomes the father of two sets of male twins. ^{Ch. 185}
Hikari (光; Sekirei #11) and Hibiki (響; Sekirei #12)
Hikari Voiced by: Yuko Kaida (Japanese); Brittney Karbowski (English)
Hibiki Voiced by: Michiko Neya (Japanese); Cherami Leigh (English)
Twin sisters that have power over electricity and Seo's Sekirei. In the First and Second stages, they seek to fight unwinged Sekirei. It is later stated by Homura that, although they are the constant underdogs, they have more expertise in fighting. In the anime, Hikari is seen wearing violet or blue outfits (darker ones in the manga), while Hibiki is seen wearing purple or pink outfits (brighter ones in the manga). Hikari is more emotional and has a short temper (and larger breasts), unlike her sister who is practically the leader of the pair. They are aware that Seo is not the most impressive Ashikabi especially since he blew all of the money in their MBI Cash Card shortly after their being winged (which gives them the reputation of being the Sekirei of the "Loser/Trashy Ashikabi") and they are constantly apologizing to Miya for Seo's sponging meals and food off of her, but despite their constant exasperation with Seo they both care for him and are willing to defend him. Ironically, they refuse to let Seo wing any other Sekirei (their method of prevention being to zap him with lightning). They are nicknamed the "Lightning Twins", in reference to their names (their names can also mean "light and sound" allegorically), and their Norito is "By the thunderclap of our contract, destroy the disasters that befall our Ashikabi!" Both are eliminated from the Sekirei Fight when they are thrown off Kamikura island with their Ashikabi by Musubi, and a year later are each the mother of male twins (it is never specified which set of twins belongs to which mother) named Raimei, Raigou, Raizou and Raiden, all of whom have inherited their mothers' powers of lightning (usually electrocuting their father Seo). ^{Ch. 185}
Haruka Shigi (鷸 ハルカ, Shigi Haruka) and Kuno (久能; Sekirei #95)
Shigi Voiced by: Nobuhiko Okamoto (Japanese); Jessie James Grelle (English)
Kuno Voiced by: Satomi Akesaka (Japanese); Kate Bristol (English)
Haruka Shigi is a 19-year-old ronin college student who, like Minato, wishes to enroll in Tokyo University but has failed the entrance examination twice. Kuno, his Sekirei, is a weak, klutzy crybaby whose main ability is her voice, using it to either confuse their enemy or block their attacks. With her Norito, she can drain the energy from her enemies while putting them to sleep, but it seems to have a weak effect from a long distance. Shigi desires to defend her and wants to withdraw from the Game by leaving Tokyo before MBI's soldiers could capture them, and sought Minato and Kaoru's help to escape Tokyo, which eventually succeeded despite being injured along with Kuno during an encounter with the Disciplinary Squad. Before the final stage begins, Minato receives a letter from them, learning that they are now living with Shigi's parents in Kyoto and are rooting for him to win. They return in Chapter 163 to defend the MBI headquarters from invasion by armed troops. In the year after the final battle, Shigi and Kuno return to Tokyo and Shigi passes the university entrance examination.^{Ch. 185} Kuno's Norito is "By the song of my contract, light the path of my Ashikabi!"
Kaho (Sekirei #87)
A Sekirei who takes part in the final match of the third stage along her Ashikabi Orihiko Oosumi (Oosumi Orihiko). She survives the final match when the Jinki obtained by Minato rolls over to Kaho and she grabs it, thus making her immune to the special wavelength created by Minaka to terminate all disqualified Sekirei at the place. Kaho is known for being very strong and her weapon of choice is a naginata. She was rescued by Yume along with Musubi when they were children. Just like Musubi, she vows to defeat Karasuba by herself, thus she refuses to return the Jinki to Minato, as it qualifies her to confront Karasuba in the Final Stage. In the first match of the Final Stage, Kaho is defeated by Karasuba and entrusts Musubi with their dream of one of them winning the Sekirei Fight and releasing the others. Her Norito is "By the dance of my contract, mow down the troubles of my Ashikabi!"^{Ch. 147} A few years after Musubi's return from Kouten, she and her Ashikabi Oosumi, at Minato's recommendation, join the Discipline Squad.
Narashino (習志野; Sekirei #74)
Voiced by: Mikako Takahashi (drama CD)
A Sekirei whose Ashikabi is Osamu Tsudanuma (津田沼修, Tsudanuma Osamu). Her only appearance so far is in an Omake, where she convinces her Ashikabi that they should go after Yukari and Shiina for the 1,000,000 yen bounty. Her power remains a mystery, since she was blown away (but not terminated) by just one attack from Shiina. Later it is revealed that both Narashino and Osamu managed to flee Tokyo just like Shigi and Kuno.
Saki (サキ; Sekirei #55)^{Vol. 7, p.181}
A Sekirei that only appeared in the manga with a one page of profile on her.
Yashima (八嶋; Sekirei #84)
Voiced by: Yōko Hikasa (Japanese); Lindsay Seidel (English)
A Sekirei who wields a massive hammer as her personal weapon. Her Ashikabi is Junichi Tanigawa (谷川 じゅんいち, Tanigawa Jun'ichi; Voiced by: Shunzo Miyasaka (Japanese); Newton Pittman (English)), who treated her as nothing more than a possession, both verbally and physically abusing her. Despite using a Norito to power up, she was defeated by Shiina's Death Garden and lost her Sekirei crest. Her Norito is "The hammer of my pledge! Shatter the enemy of my Ashikabi!", enabling her to use her Gravity Hammer (グラビティーハンマー, Gurabitī Hanmā) attack. After the final battle and all of the fallen Sekirei have been restored, she refuses to immediately return to her former Ashikabi despite his attempts, telling Homura that she probably will be winged again by Junichi but "instead of getting winged without reason and offering [herself] like a slave, this time [she wants] to do it properly or it will have no meaning" and she wants to make Junichi think hard about it this time.^{Ch. 186}
Natsu (夏; Sekirei #72)
The third Sekirei defeated by Uzume on the instructions of Higa.
Ikki (伊岐; Sekirei #19)
A Sekirei who wielded dual kodachi as weapons. She was defeated and nearly killed by Karasuba with a sword thrust through her chest. She only appears on one page of chapter 53.
Namiji (波路; Sekirei #73)
Voiced by: Ayumi Fujimura (Japanese); Dana Schultes (English)
A Sekirei wielding a massive halberd. She and her Ashikabi Koji Takano (高野 広次, Takano Kōji; Voiced by: Atsushi Abe (Japanese); Viktor Walker (English)) were winners of the second match of the Third Stage. She was defeated by Shiina and Uzume on the instructions of Higa.
Nanaha (七葉; Sekirei #78)
A Sekirei whose Ashikabi, Yoichi Himura (日村 容一, Himura Yōichi; Voiced by: Kazuyuki Okitsu (Japanese); Brandon Potter (English)), went to Minato for help in escaping the city. After Minato, who is insulted by Himura's condescending attitude towards Shigi and Kuno, refuses to help them, she is soon defeated by Karasuba.

=== Video game characters ===
Kuruse (来瀬; Sekirei #54)
Voiced by: Haruka Tomatsu
A young Sekirei who is a trident-based fighter. She has the ability to use multiple tridents by conjuring them in order to launch them as projectiles. Eventually becomes an ally of Minato and his Sekirei.
Yahan (夜半; Sekirei #57)
Voiced by: Ayahi Takagaki
A black-haired, dark-skinned Sekirei who uses teleportation to help her fight as her unarmed combat skills are considered to be average. She uses a dagger when fighting in conjunction with her abilities. Her Ashikabi is Reiji Koya (甲屋 玲治, Koya Reiji; Voiced by Yuichi Nakamura).
Aka-chan (赤ちゃん)
Voiced by: Haruka Tomatsu
An abandoned baby found by Minato and his Sekirei, she is the target of the two Sekirei due to an unknown ability.

== Works cited ==
- "Ch." is shortened form for chapter and refers to a chapter number of the Sekirei manga
- "Ep." is shortened form for episode and refers to an episode number of the Sekirei anime
