= Sayori Ishizuka =

Japanese voice actress

Sayori Ishizuka (石塚 さより, Ishizuka Sayori; born August 30, 1977) is a Japanese voice actress. She has voiced in many popular anime series, such as MÄR and To Heart 2.

== Roles ==
- Asobi ni iku yo! as Maya
- Bleach as Franceska Mila Rose, Lisa Yadomaru
- D.C. ~Da Capo~ as Sa-chin
- Danball Senki Wars as Hikaru Hoshihara
- Futari wa Precure Splash Star as Ayano Takeuchi
- Magical Kanan as Miyuri Suzuhara
- MÄR as Ginta's mother; Reginleif Princess
- Mekakucity Actors as Young Kousuke Seto
- Mermaid Melody: Pichi Pichi Pitch as Izul
- Ouran High School Host Club as Hitachiin's Helper; Ruri Karasuma
- Soul Eater Monotone Princess (video game) as Ponera
- Sekirei as Shiina, Chiho
- To Heart 2 as Sango Himeyuri
- Windy Tales as Miasa
- Wings of Rean as Sere
- Asura Cryin' as Susugihara Yo
- Sono Kuchibiru ni Yoru no Tsuyu Drama CD as Bus Announcer
- Bleach: Thousand-Year Blood War as Franceska Mila Rose, Lisa Yadomaru
