= Huyền Chi =

Vietnamese voice actress

Võ Huyền Chi
- Born: Ho Chi Minh City, Vietnam
- Occupations: Voice actress, dubbing director, singer, lyricist
- Years active: 2003–

Võ Huyền Chi is a Vietnamese voice actress based in Ho Chi Minh City.

== Career ==
She worked at TVM Corp and is known for roles in movies, Vietnamese song lyrics for films on HTV3 and voice acting the character Sakura Kinomoto in Cardcaptor Sakura and Ran Mori in Detective Conan. She also wrote the Vietnamese lyrics to the song Let It Go from the 2013 Disney film Frozen, whose music video attracted over 20 million views on YouTube.

== Dubbing roles ==
=== Drama ===
- Smile Again (2010 TV series) (Bong Yi)
- Painter of the Wind (Shin Yoo Bok)
- Loving You a Thousand Times (Go Eun Nim)
- Tazza (Lee Nan-sook / Mi-na)
- The 1st Shop of Coffee Prince (Go Eun Chan)
- You're Beautiful (TV series) (Go Mi Nam)
- High Kick! (Shin Ji)
- High Kick! (season 2) (Hae Ri and Hwang Jung Eum)
- Phantom (TV series) (Yoo Kang Mi)
- Missing You (2013 TV series) (Lee Soo Yoen)
- Kimchi Cheese Smile (Wuldo)
- Dream High (Go Hye Mi)
- Giant (TV series) (Lee Mi Joo)
- Brilliant Legacy (Go Eun Sung)
- The Heirs (Eun Sang)
- The Queen's Classroom (2013 TV series) (Oh Dong-gu)
- Reply 1997 (Sung Shi-won)

=== Cartoons and anime ===
- Olive and The Rhyme Rescue Crew (Olive)
- Cardcaptor Sakura (Sakura Kinomoto)
- Tsubasa: Reservoir Chronicle (Clone Sakura)
- Detective Conan (Ran Mori)
- Ben 10 (Xylene)
- Teletubbies (Po)
- Doraemon (Dorami and Shizuka's mother)
- The Snow Queen (Yohanna, Amore the monkey)
- The Legend of Nezha (Nezha)
- Bubu Chacha (Bu Bu)
- Tiểu long A Bố (A Bố)
- Cậu bé Tuyết (Bé Tuyết)
- Absolute Boy (Wakkun)
- Xiaolin Showdown (Kimiko)
- Suite PreCure (Kanade Minamino / Cure Rhythm)
- Kobato. (Chise Mihara)
- Cyborg Kuro-chan (Kotaro)
- Samurai 7 (Kirara)
- Azumanga Daioh (Tomo)
- Fruits Basket (Kagura)
- Anastasia (Anastasia)
- Rio (Jewel)
- Smile PreCure! (Yayoi Kise / Cure Peace)
- Winx Club (Flora)
- Fairy Tail (Lucy Heartfilia (first 48 episodes), Porlyusica)
- Naruto (Konohamaru)
- Barbie: Life in the Dreamhouse (Barbie)
- Shugo Chara! (Utau Hoshina)
- Pokémon: XY (Jessie, Bonnie), B&W (Officer Jenny, Jessie), Sun & Moon (Lilie, Lana)
- Pokémon the Movie: The Power of Ours (Margo, Harriet)
- Yo-kai Watch (Fumi)
- Pokémon Horizons: The Series (Liko)

=== OST ===
- Doraemon (Doraemon)
- Chính là Na Tra (The legend of Nezha)
- Winx Club
- Thiên Trúc vạn dặm (Journey to the west)
- Không thể rời xa (Absolute Boy)
- Đông tan (Fruit Basket)
- Hương xuân nhẹ nhàng (Fruit Basket)
- Mơ khúc bên người (Hongmao and Lantu)
- Mơ khúc (Hongmao and Lantu 2)
- Dừng chân (Hongmao and Lantu 3)
- Mãi vui (Cardcaptor Sakura)
- Phút giây tuyệt vời (Cardcaptor Sakura 2)
- Kẹo thơm muôn màu (Cardcaptor Sakura 2)
- Nắm giữ ước mơ (Kobato)
- Chiếc bóng ký ức (Kobato)
- Niềm tin (Kobato)
- Kuro đã đến đây (Cyborg Kuro-chan)
- Thiên đường ngọt ngào (Azumanga Daioh)
- Đi tìm ước mơ (Bubu Chacha)
- Giấc mơ thần tiên (Doraemon)
- Hãy ôm chặt tay nhau (Doraemon)
- Xin luôn có nhau (Doraemon movie 2007)
- Cứ vui thôi (Doraemon movie 2009)
- Let It Go (Frozen)
- Crayon Shin-chan

=== Live action films ===
- Harry Potter film series - Hermione Granger (Emma Watson)
