= Fairy Tail season 1 =

First season of Fairy Tail

Fairy Tail
- Season 1
- Cover of the first home media volume released by Pony Canyon in Japan on January 29, 2010, featuring Natsu Dragneel and Happy
- No. of episodes: 175

Release
- Original network: TV Tokyo
- Original release: October 12, 2009 – March 30, 2013

Season chronology
- Next → Season 2

The first season of the Fairy Tail anime television series was directed by Shinji Ishihira and produced by A-1 Pictures and Satelight. The season adapts the first 35 volumes of the manga series Fairy Tail by Hiro Mashima. It follows the first adventures of Natsu Dragneel and Lucy Heartfilia of the fictional guild Fairy Tail. Natsu befriends Lucy who joins the titular guild and later goes on missions with her to earn money along with fellow wizards Gray Fullbuster and Erza Scarlet, as well as Natsu's flying cat, Happy.

The season ran from October 12, 2009, to March 30, 2013, on TV Tokyo and its affiliates. It was later released on home media in 44 DVD compilations, each containing four episodes, by Pony Canyon between January 29, 2010, and September 4, 2013. Crunchyroll streamed the season's episodes subtitled in English on its website. The season was streamed as a simulcast one hour after each aired on TV Tokyo. The season was licensed by Animax Asia for a Southeast Asian broadcast. Their adaptation aired from September 30, 2010, to April 9, 2014. DVDs of their adaptations were not released. In 2011, Funimation Entertainment licensed the series for an English DVD release in North America. The season was released in multiple compilations between November 22, 2011, and October 28, 2014. The series also aired English dubbed in North America on the now-defunct Funimation Channel from November 22, 2011, to January 26, 2016.

== Episodes ==
No. overall	No. in season	Title	Directed by	Written by	Animation directed by	Original release date	English air date
Prologue
1	1	"The Fairy Tail"; Transliteration: "Yōsei no Shippo" (Japanese: 妖精の尻尾)	Directed by : Hiroyuki Fukushima; Storyboarded by : Shinji Ishihira	Masashi Sogo	Tomoaki Chishima & Kenji Hattori	October 12, 2009	November 22, 2011
Lucy Heartfilia, a celestial wizard who wants to join the Fairy Tail wizards' guild, is nearly hypnotized by a flirtatious wizard named Salamander into becoming one of his admirers. She is inadvertently saved when Natsu Dragneel and his cat-like partner Happy approach him, mistaking "Salamander" for Igneel, a fire dragon they are searching for. Although Lucy buys the two travelers a meal as thanks, they feel indebted and promise to properly repay her. Later, Salamander lures Lucy to a yacht party in exchange for membership into Fairy Tail, intending to smuggle her and other young girls he has kidnapped. Natsu and Happy rescue Lucy again and expose Salamander as an imposter named Bora. Natsu uses his Fire Dragon Slayer magic to defeat Bora, revealing himself to be the real Salamander and unwittingly destroying the port in the process. He then invites Lucy to join Fairy Tail, which she happily accepts as they flee from the intervening army.
2	2	"Fire Dragon, Monkey, and Bull"; Transliteration: "Karyū to Saru to Ushi" (Japanese: 火竜と猿と牛)	Directed by : Kiichi Suzuno; Storyboarded by : Shinji Ishihira	Atsuhiro Tomioka	Kazuyuki Ikai	October 19, 2009	November 29, 2011
Natsu and Happy bring Lucy to the Fairy Tail guildhall in Magnolia, where she officially joins the guild. Lucy overhears the guild master Makarov Dreyar argue with the young boy Romeo Conbolt over the boy's father, Macao, who has disappeared on a mission at Mount Hakobe. Sympathizing with Romeo due to the disappearance of Igneel, his own adoptive father, Natsu sets out to find Macao, with Lucy and Happy accompanying him. At the mountain, the three encounter a monkey-like Vulcan monster that kidnaps Lucy. Natsu follows the Vulcan to its cave, but is thrown outside into a crevice. Lucy summons her bull celestial spirit Taurus to fight the Vulcan, but Natsu re-enters the cave and knocks out Taurus, whom he mistakes for another monster. Natsu defeats the Vulcan and discovers it to be Macao, who had been possessed by the monster. After Macao is healed, Natsu, Lucy, and Happy reunite him with Romeo.
3	3	"Infiltrate the Everlue Mansion"; Transliteration: "Sennyū Seyo!! Ebarū Yashiki" (Japanese: 潛入せよ!! エバルー屋敷)	Directed by : Yusaku Saotome; Storyboarded by : Shinji Ishihira	Shōji Yonemura	Teruhiko Yamazaki & Akiko Matsuo	October 26, 2009	December 6, 2011
Natsu and Happy appear uninvited within Lucy's new apartment while she is settling in. Lucy demonstrates her magic by summoning a celestial spirit that she names Plue, who suggests that the three wizards form a team. Natsu tricks Lucy into accepting a job to steal a book titled Daybreak from its repulsive owner, Duke Everlue, which requires her to be hired as his maid. They arrive at the town of Shirotsume and learn that their client, Kaby Melon, has changed the job to destroying the book and greatly increased the reward to 2 million jewels. When Everlue rejects Lucy and insults her appearance, the three infiltrate his mansion and steal the book. However, Everlue and his maids attack the three. Lucy flees into the sewers and discovers the book's hidden secrets before Everlue catches her, while Natsu defeats Everlue's bodyguards, the Vanish Brothers.
4	4	"Dear Kaby" (Note: Stylized in all caps in the original Latin script); Transliteration: "Shin'ai Naru Kābii e" (Japanese: 親愛なるカービィへ)	Directed by : Naomichi Yamato; Storyboarded by : Shinji Ishihira	Masashi Sogo	Tomoki Mizuno	November 2, 2009	December 13, 2011
Lucy learns that Daybreak's deceased author, Kemu Zaleon, was blackmailed by Everlue into writing the book in solitary confinement for three years. Lucy summons her crab spirit Cancer against Everlue, prompting the duke to summon Virgo, his monstrous maid spirit; to the shock of both, Natsu appears alongside Virgo after grabbing onto her from upstairs. After Natsu and Lucy defeat Everlue and Virgo, they return Daybreak to Kaby, Kemu's son, who intends to preserve his father's honor by burning the book. However, Lucy reveals that the book is secretly Kemu's memoir written for Kaby, persuading him to keep the book. To Lucy's dismay, Natsu realizes that Kaby has no money and declines the 2 million jewel reward. On their way home, the three defeat a band of dark wizards alongside their guildmate Gray Fullbuster; one of the dark wizards utters "Lullaby" before a magic shadow engulfs them.
Eisenwald Arc
5	5	"The Wizard in Armor"; Transliteration: "Yoroi no Madōshi" (Japanese: 鎧の魔導士)	Directed by : Shigeru Yamazaki; Storyboarded by : Shinji Ishihira	Fumihiko Shimo	Jōji Yanase	November 9, 2009	December 20, 2011
Erza Scarlet, Fairy Tail's strongest female wizard and disciplinarian, returns to the guild after an extended absence. To the guild's shock, Erza recruits Natsu and Gray to help her stop the dark guild Eisenwald from acquiring Lullaby, a demon flute that kills all who hear its music; the guild's administrator, Mirajane Strauss, implores Lucy to keep Natsu and Gray from fighting and angering Erza. Arriving at the town of Onibas, Natsu is accidentally left on the train and assaulted by Kageyama, a shadow wizard from Eisenwald. Unable to fight back due to his motion sickness, Natsu catches a glimpse of Lullaby before his friends rescue him. Kageyama delivers Lullaby to Eisenwald's leader, Erigor, who plans to use the flute for an assassination plot.
6	6	"Fairies in the Wind"; Transliteration: "Yōsei-tachi wa Kaze no Naka" (Japanese: 妖精たちは風の中)	Directed by : Kiichi Suzuno; Storyboarded by : Shinji Ishihira	Fumihiko Shimo	Kazuyuki Ikai	November 16, 2009	January 10, 2012
The Fairy Tail wizards chase Eisenwald to a train station in Oshibana, believing that Erigor intends to broadcast Lullaby's song through the station's speaker system to kill innocent civilians. While Natsu and Gray follow Erigor, Erza single-handedly defeats most of the remaining wizards with her magic weaponry and armor. After Erza evacuates the city, Erigor traps her and the other wizards inside an impenetrable wind barrier before flying away. Meanwhile, Gray learns from the Eisenwald wizard Rayule that Erigor's true targets are Makarov and the other legal guild masters at a conference in the nearby town of Clover.
7	7	"Flame and Wind"; Transliteration: "Honō to Kaze" (Japanese: 炎と風)	Directed by : Yoshiyuki Asai; Storyboarded by : Shinji Ishihira	Atsuhiro Tomioka	Tomohiro Koyama	November 23, 2009	January 17, 2012
Natsu defeats Kageyama, whom Erza determines has the ability to dispel the wind barrier trapping them inside Oshibana Station. Before she can threaten Kageyama into cooperating, he is seriously injured by his guildmate Karacka in an attempt to silence him. As the group thinks of another way out, Happy remembers that Virgo had given him her key to relay to Lucy, who summons Virgo and uses the spirit's power to burrow out from beneath the barrier; the Fairy Tail wizards take pity on Kageyama and bring him along as well. Natsu and Happy catch up with Erigor as he flies towards Clover and battle him. Erigor surrounds himself with a barrier of wind to negate Natsu's attacks.
8	8	"The Strongest Team"; Transliteration: "Saikyō Chīmu!!!" (Japanese: 最強チーム!!!)	Directed by : Kyōhei Ishiguro; Storyboarded by : Shinji Ishihira	Shōji Yonemura	Asako Inayoshi	November 30, 2009	January 24, 2012
Angered by his inability to breach Erigor's wind armor, Natsu intensifies his flames and dissipates Erigor's spell with the heat, defeating him. When Natsu's friends catch up with him, Kageyama takes Lullaby from Erigor and escapes to Clover on their magically fueled car to carry out Eisenwald's plot. As he prepares to kill the guild masters outside the conference hall, he is found by Makarov, who persuades him to surrender. However, the flute is revealed to contain a gigantic demon created by the ancient dark wizard Zeref, which emerges from the flute and attempts to kill the guild masters on its own. Natsu, Gray, and Erza vanquish the demon and rescue the guild masters, but accidentally demolish the conference hall in the process.
9	9	"Natsu Devours a Village"; Transliteration: "Natsu, Mura o Kū" (Japanese: ナツ、村を食う)	Directed by : Mitsuhiro Yoneda; Storyboarded by : Shinji Ishihira	Masashi Sogo	Masaki Inada	December 7, 2009	January 31, 2012
While returning home from Clover, the starving Fairy Tail wizards stumble upon a deserted village with freshly prepared meals lying about. Erza suspects something amiss and sends the others to find mushrooms in the nearby forest, resulting in giant mushrooms sprouting from Natsu, Gray, and Happy's heads after the three eat them. Meanwhile, Erza and Makarov discover a magic circle that transforms everything in the village into giant monsters, which the wizards attempt to eat, only to find them inedible. As they are nearly devoured, Makarov lifts the spell and frees the villagers trapped inside the monsters.
10	10	"Natsu vs. Erza"; Transliteration: "Natsu bāsasu Eruza" (Japanese: ナツ vs. エルザ)	Hiroyuki Fukushima	Masashi Sogo	Kenji Hattori	December 14, 2009	February 7, 2012
After returning to Magnolia, Natsu duels Erza as a test of strength. However, an emissary from the Magic Council interrupts the duel and arrests Erza for the damages caused during Fairy Tail's conflict with Eisenwald. Siegrain, a council member, warns that Erza should keep their shared past a secret. Macao disguises himself as Natsu as a favor for saving his life, allowing Natsu to storm the council headquarters and rescue Erza. However, he discovers that Erza is merely standing a mock trial for the council to assert their authority, and the two are forced to spend the night in a cell. Natsu tries to resume their match at the guild the next day, but she quickly defeats him with a single punch. Still determined to prove himself, Natsu takes an S-Class job request with Happy against Makarov's permission; Lucy joins them after discovering that the reward includes a zodiac key that she wants to collect.
Galuna Island Arc
11	11	"The Cursed Island"; Transliteration: "Norowa-reta Shima" (Japanese: 呪われた島)	Directed by : Satoshi Shimizu; Storyboarded by : Mashu Itō	Fumihiko Shimo	Satoru Minowa	December 21, 2009	February 14, 2012
Natsu, Lucy, and Happy embark on the S-Class quest to lift a curse on Galuna Island that turns its residents into demons when they are exposed to moonlight. Gray tracks the three down to return them to the guildhall, but Natsu knocks him unconscious and takes him with them, believing they can avoid punishment if they fulfill the mission. After the ferryman of their boat mysteriously disappears mid-route, the wizards are shipwrecked on the island and witness the local villagers transform into demons firsthand. While exploring, the wizards discover the frozen body of Deliora—a demon whom Gray's magic teacher, Ur, sacrificed herself for to seal away—and a cult of wizards who are attempting to resurrect the demon.
12	12	"Moon Drip"; Transliteration: "Mūn Dorippu" (Japanese: 月の雫(ムーンドリップ))	Directed by : Yusaku Saotome; Storyboarded by : Hiroyuki Fukushima	Atsuhiro Tomioka	Akiko Matsuo & Yuji Ushijima	January 4, 2010	February 21, 2012
Galuna Island's cult perform a ceremonial spell called Moon Drip in order to melt the permanent ice freezing Deliora, which the Fairy Tail wizards surmise to be the cause of the island's curse. Gray recognizes the cult's leader "Reitei" as Lyon Vastia, another one of Ur's former students, who resents Gray for Ur's death. After Lyon freezes most of Natsu's body in unmeltable ice, Gray kicks Natsu down a hill to protect him and prepares to fight Lyon. Meanwhile, Erza commandeers a pirate ship to take her to Galuna Island, intent on retrieving her guildmates for punishment over their disobedience.
13	13	"Natsu vs. Yuka the Wave User"; Transliteration: "Natsu bāsasu Hadō no Yūka" (Japanese: ナツ vs. 波動のユウカ)	Naomichi Yamato	Shōji Yonemura	Tomoki Mizuno	January 11, 2010	February 28, 2012
Lyon reveals his plan to fight and kill Deliora, something Ur failed to accomplish, thereby achieving his dream of surpassing his teacher. Gray is badly injured, but a partially frozen Natsu finds him and returns him to the village, where Natsu finally thaws out. Three of Lyon's followers—Sherry Blendy, Yuka Suzuki, and Toby Orrolta—arrive atop Angelica, Sherry's gargantuan-sized rat, who pours a flume of acidic jelly on the village to destroy it, but Natsu protects the villagers by dispersing the jelly with his fire magic. After Natsu defeats Yuka and Toby, Lucy battles Sherry, who has the power to control Lucy's celestial spirits.
14	14	"Just Do Whatever!!"; Transliteration: "Katte ni Shiyagare!!" (Japanese: 勝手にしやがれ!!)	Directed by : Shigeru Yamazaki; Storyboarded by : Hiroyuki Fukushima	Fumihiko Shimo	Jōji Yanase	January 18, 2010	March 6, 2012
Lucy uses Aquarius to sweep Sherry away in a tidal wave and easily defeats her. Erza finally arrives on Galuna Island and quickly defeats Angelica before escorting Lucy and Happy to the village, where Gray is recovering. Uninterested in the islanders' situation and disappointed with Gray's failure to return the others to Fairy Tail, Erza attempts to convince Gray to help her search for Natsu. After hearing Gray's resolve to defeat Lyon, however, Erza reconsiders and joins the wizards to complete their quest. While Natsu duels with Lyon to prevent Deliora's resurrection alone, Gray tells his friends that Ur is still alive.
15	15	"Eternal Magic"; Transliteration: "Eien no Mahō" (Japanese: 永遠の魔法)	Directed by : Masaomi Andō; Storyboarded by : Shinji Ishihira	Atsuhiro Tomioka	Asako Inayoshi	January 25, 2010	April 3, 2012
In a flashback, an eight-year-old Gray is found by Ur and Lyon as the sole survivor of one of Deliora's attacks. Seeking revenge against Deliora for killing his family, Gray becomes Ur's student in order to learn magic to defeat it. When Deliora reappears, Gray recklessly attempts to fight the demon and is easily overpowered. Ur arrives and casts the forbidden spell Iced Shell, which transforms her body into the ice that freezes Deliora. Although Ur explains that she will remain alive in this form, she has Gray inform Lyon that she has died so he will not waste his life trying to return her to normal, which sparks Lyon's resentment towards Gray. Back in the present, Gray engages Lyon again and prepares to use Iced Shell on his rival.
16	16	"The Final Showdown on Galuna Island"; Transliteration: "Garuna-tō - Saishū Kessen" (Japanese: ガルナ島 最終決戦)	Yoshiyuki Asai	Shōji Yonemura	Tomohiro Koyama	February 1, 2010	April 10, 2012
Natsu realizes Gray plans to sacrifice himself and stops him from casting Iced Shell. Realizing the pointlessness of his attempted sacrifice as Lyon's followers would be able to restore him with Moon Drip, Gray tells Lyon about Ur's survival; however, Lyon reveals he already knows the truth and still intends to melt Ur's former body, which would kill her. Enraged, Gray defeats Lyon, but is too late to stop Deliora from stirring as Toby continues the Moon Drip ceremony. Meanwhile, Natsu fights with Lyon's henchman Zalty, who has the power to control the time of objects around them.
17	17	"Burst"	Directed by : Mitsuhiro Yoneda; Storyboarded by : Touma Shirakawa	Masashi Sogo	Masaki Inada	February 8, 2010	April 17, 2012
Natsu and Erza defeat Zalty and Toby, but fail to stop the Moon Drip ceremony in time. Natsu, Gray, and Lyon prepare to fight Deliora, only for the demon to disintegrate, revealing that it could not survive being frozen for ten years. Despite Deliora's death, the Fairy Tail wizards realize they have yet to lift the island's curse; Lyon disproves Moon Drip as the cause, as he and his cult have remained unaffected over their years of performing the spell. The wizards return to the village to find that it has been repaired by Zalty, who reveals himself to be Ultear Milkovich, Ur's daughter and Siegrain's associate. Determining the true cause of the curse, Erza declares that she will lift it by destroying the moon itself as per the village chief's suggestion.
18	18	"Reach the Sky Above"; Transliteration: "Todoke - Ano Sora ni" (Japanese: 届け あの空に)	Directed by : Satoshi Shimizu; Storyboarded by : Mashu Itō	Fumihiko Shimo	Toshiko Sasaki & Satoru Minowa	February 15, 2010	April 24, 2012
Natsu and Erza aim their attacks at the moon to lift the curse, destroying a magical membrane cast over the island by Moon Drip, which turns out to be the direct cause of the curse. When the villagers do not change from their demonic forms, Erza explains that the villagers were always demons with the ability to shapeshift into humans, and that the "curse" affected their memories of it. The missing ferryman also returns, revealing himself to be a demon who avoided the curse, and thanks Fairy Tail for returning his village to normal. The celebration is joined by Sherry and Yuka, who make peace with the villagers; freed from his obsession with Deliora, Lyon considers joining a guild himself. After the villagers repay Fairy Tail with the promised zodiac key of Sagittarius, Erza takes the team home to be punished by Makarov.
Standalone side stories
19	19	"Changeling"; Transliteration: "Chenjiringu" (Japanese: チェンジリング)	Hiroyuki Fukushima	Masashi Sogo	Takashi Uchida	February 22, 2010	May 1, 2012
While waiting for Makarov to return from an errand, Natsu is intrigued by an unfamiliar request on the job board and recites the ancient words written on it, causing him, Lucy, and Happy to switch bodies with Loke, Gray, and Erza, respectively. With thirty minutes to reverse the spell before its effects remain permanent, the group's guildmate Levy McGarden uses her linguistic skills to decode and undo the spell. However, she only restores Lucy and Gray to normal, and moreover causes everyone else in the guild to switch bodies as well.
20	20	"Natsu and the Dragon Egg"; Transliteration: "Natsu to Doragon no Tamago" (Japanese: ナツとドラゴンの卵)	Directed by : Yusaku Saotome; Storyboarded by : Shinji Ishihira	Shōji Yonemura	Akiko Matsuo & Yuji Ushijima	March 1, 2010	May 8, 2012
After Natsu and Happy argue with each other, Lucy finds a six-year-old painting of the guild that depicts Happy as a dragon. She shows the painting to Mirajane, who tells Lucy the story behind it. In a flashback, Natsu discovers what he assumes to be a dragon's egg, and Mirajane's younger sister, Lisanna, helps him care for it. When the egg goes missing, Natsu and his friends accuse each other of stealing it until it is returned by Elfman, Mirajane and Lisanna's brother, who confesses that he wanted to feel useful by helping them in secret. The egg suddenly hatches into Happy, whose birth breaks the tension within the guild and prompts Natsu to give him his name. Back in the present, as Lucy meets up with a reconciled Happy and Natsu, she realizes that she has never met Lisanna and wonders what became of her.
Phantom Lord Arc
21	21	"The Phantom Lord"; Transliteration: "Yūki no Shihaisha" (Japanese: 幽鬼の支配者)	Directed by : Shunichi Yoshizawa; Storyboarded by : Shinji Ishihira	Atsuhiro Tomioka	Atsushi Aono	March 8, 2010	May 15, 2012
Natsu and his friends return from a mission to find their guildhall damaged by Gajeel Redfox, a Dragon Slayer from the rival Phantom Lord guild. Makarov willingly ignores the situation to maintain the law of neutrality between guilds, but when Gajeel brutally assaults Levy, Jet, and Droy, a furious Makarov declares war on Phantom Lord and leads a counterattack on their guildhall. Lucy stays behind to visit Levy and her friends at the hospital, but is abducted by Juvia Lockser and Sol, two members of Phantom Lord's S-Class equivalent team, the Element 4.
22	22	"Lucy Heartfilia"; Transliteration: "Rūshii Hātofiria" (Japanese: ルーシィ・ハートフィリア)	Directed by : Eisuke Hayashi; Storyboarded by : Shinji Ishihira & Touma Shirakawa	Atsuhiro Tomioka	Toshiharu Murata	March 15, 2010	May 22, 2012
Makarov confronts Phantom Lord's master, Jose Porla, but Element 4 member Aria drains his magical powers, forcing Fairy Tail to retreat. Realizing that Lucy has been kidnapped, Natsu infiltrates one of their tower headquarters to rescue her. Meanwhile, Lucy learns that her father, Jude Heartfilia, has ordered her capture, with Phantom Lord's attacks done while carrying out his request of returning her to the Heartfilia family estate after she ran away from home. Desperate to escape, Lucy jumps from her tower window and Natsu rescues her.
23	23	"15 Minutes"; Transliteration: "Jūgo-fun" (Japanese: 15分)	Directed by : Kyōhei Ishiguro; Storyboarded by : Shinji Ishihira	Masashi Sogo	Yousuke Kabashima	March 22, 2010	May 29, 2012
As the injured Makarov is left with Fairy Tail's medical advisor Porlyusica to recover, Jose uses Phantom Lord's mechanized guildhall and fires on Fairy Tail with its magic energy super cannon, Jupiter. Erza shields everyone else from the blast, leaving her wounded. After the guild refuses Jose's order to surrender Lucy, he prepares to fire Jupiter again after a recharge time of 15 minutes, conjuring an army of phantom soldiers to keep the guild occupied. Mirajane sends Lucy away for safety while Natsu enters Jupiter to destroy its lacrima crystal core, but Element 4 member Totomaru uses his own fire powers to thwart Natsu.
24	24	"To Keep From Seeing Those Tears"; Transliteration: "Sono Namida o Minai Tame ni" (Japanese: その涙を見ない為に)	Directed by : Mitsuhiro Yoneda; Storyboarded by : Shinji Ishihira	Shōji Yonemura	Masaki Inada	March 29, 2010	June 5, 2012
Natsu successfully destroys Jupiter, while Gray and Elfman arrive and defeat Totomaru. In response, Jose reconfigures the Phantom Lord guildhall into a giant robot, which begins casting the forbidden spell Abyss Break to wipe out the city. Mirajane offers herself to Phantom Lord while disguised as Lucy, but Jose sees through her disguise and captures her. Elfman is confronted by Sol, who uses mental manipulation to force Elfman to relive his guilt of killing Lisanna, whom he attacked in a mindless rampage after attempting a full-body Takeover spell on a giant monster. Upon seeing Mirajane in danger, however, Elfman uses the same spell to transform into the monster again and fight Sol.
25	25	"A Flower Blooms in the Rain"; Transliteration: "Ame no Naka ni Saku Hana" (Japanese: 雨の中に咲く花)	Yoshiyuki Asai	Fumihiko Shimo	Toshiharu Murata	April 12, 2010	June 12, 2012
Elfman defeats Sol and apologizes to Mirajane for failing to protect Lisanna. Mirajane realizes that the casting of Abyss Break has slowed down, and deduces that they can stop the spell by defeating the remaining Element 4 members. Meanwhile, Gray encounters Juvia, who immediately falls in love with him. Impervious to Gray's attacks due to her ability to turn into water, Juvia urges Gray to surrender Lucy peacefully, but Gray refuses, which Juvia misinterprets to be out of romantic love for Lucy. Juvia continues to attack Gray when she is hurt by his comment on the "depressing" rain she is causing, but regains her love for him when he defeats her and saves her from falling to her death, leading the rain to clear away for the first time in her life. Meanwhile, Natsu confronts the final member of Element 4, Aria.
26	26	"Wings of Flame"; Transliteration: "Honō no Tsubasa" (Japanese: 炎の翼)	Directed by : Noriaki Saito; Storyboarded by : Shinji Ishihira & Touma Shirakawa	Atsuhiro Tomioka	Sunghoo Park & Young-Beom Kim	April 19, 2010	June 19, 2012
The injured Erza joins the fight against Aria easily defeats him, which successfully deactivates Abyss Break. Meanwhile, Lucy is kidnapped from Fairy Tail's safehouse by Gajeel, despite Loke's efforts to save her in time. Erza tells Natsu to save Lucy before Jose enters the battle to kill Erza, Gray, Elfman, and Mirajane.
27	27	"The Two Dragon Slayers"; Transliteration: "Futari no Doragon Sureiyā" (Japanese: 二人の滅竜魔導士(ドラゴンスレイヤー))	Directed by : Tetsuya Watanabe; Storyboarded by : Shinji Ishihira	Masashi Sogo	Tomoshige Inayoshi	April 26, 2010	June 26, 2012
To save Lucy, Natsu engages in a duel with Gajeel, whose Dragon Slayer magic allows the two to fight on even grounds until Gajeel gains the upper hand by eating iron to regain his energy, leaving Natsu weak without any fire to eat. Meanwhile, Jose's Shadows finally destroy the Fairy Tail guildhall. Lucy helps Natsu by summoning Sagittarius, the only celestial spirit currently in her possession, who is able to start a fire by shooting an arrow at a set of machinery, allowing Natsu to feed and continue fighting.
28	28	"Fairy Law"; Transliteration: "Fearī Rō" (Japanese: フェアリーロウ)	Hiroyuki Fukushima	Shōji Yonemura	Tomohiro Koyama	May 3, 2010	July 3, 2012
Natsu launches his full strength and finally defeats Gajeel while Erza continues dueling with Jose, who reveals his intention to hold Lucy hostage until he is able to completely monopolize her family's wealth, allowing Phantom Lord to prove its superiority over Fairy Tail. However, Makarov returns fully recovered and casts the legendary spell Fairy Law on Jose, finally ending the war between Fairy Tail and Phantom Lord.
29	29	"My Resolve"; Transliteration: "Atashi no Ketsui" (Japanese: あたしの決意)	Directed by : Yusaku Saotome; Storyboarded by : Shinji Ishihira	Fumihiko Shimo	Yuji Ushijima & Akiko Matsuo	May 10, 2010	July 10, 2012
Following Jose's defeat, Lucy realizes that Jude will do anything to have her return home and leaves for her family estate. Fearing that she will leave them, Natsu, Erza, Gray and Happy follow her. When Jude offers Lucy to accept the vast wealth at her disposal, she informs him that her home is with Fairy Tail and she must leave, renouncing her family ties in the process. Lucy reunites with her friends and they all return to Fairy Tail.
Loke Arc
30	30	"Next Generation"	Directed by : Takahiro Majima; Storyboarded by : Mashu Itō	Masashi Sogo	Miyuki Koga	May 17, 2010	July 17, 2012
The Magic Council dissolves Phantom Lord and disapproves of Fairy Tail's actions, but is unable to force them to disband. Makarov's friend from the council, Yajima, suggests that Makarov retire and choose a successor. However, Makarov refuses upon hearing the destruction caused by Natsu and his friends on their latest mission. Meanwhile, the heroes are forced to perform a play for a failing theater. Though they seemingly ruin the play and destroy the theater with their antics, it greatly entertains the audience and becomes a success.
31	31	"A Star Removed from the Sky"; Transliteration: "Sora ni Modorenai Hoshi" (Japanese: 空に戻れない星)	Directed by : Masaomi Andō; Storyboarded by : Hiroyuki Fukushima	Shōji Yonemura	Satoshi Kimura	May 24, 2010	July 24, 2012
Loke begins acting strangely around Lucy, whom Loke has always avoided in the past. After Loke breaks up with all his girlfriends and disappears, Lucy becomes concerned and investigates Loke's past. She discovers him to actually be the celestial spirit Leo, an exile from the spirit world.
32	32	"Celestial Spirit King"; Transliteration: "Seirei Ō" (Japanese: 星霊王)	Directed by : Kyōhei Ishiguro; Storyboarded by : Shinji Ishihira	Fumihiko Shimo	Asako Inayoshi	May 31, 2010	July 31, 2012
In a flashback, Leo stops his master Karen Lilica from bullying his friend Aries. However, he accidentally stops her from summoning other spirits to protect herself, indirectly leading to her death. Back in the present, Loke's three-year exile from the spirit world is causing him to gradually fade away and die. Lucy challenges the law Loke had broken to save him, causing the Celestial Spirit King to appear before them. The Celestial Spirit King reconsiders Loke's exile when Lucy summons her spirits simultaneously to support her, allowing Loke to return to the spirit world.
Tower of Heaven Arc
33	33	"The Tower of Heaven"; Transliteration: "Rakuen no Tō" (Japanese: 楽園の塔)	Directed by : Hazuki Mizumoto; Storyboarded by : Shinji Ishihira	Atsuhiro Tomioka	Tomohiro Koyama	June 7, 2010	August 7, 2012
Loke gives Lucy and the others passports to the Fiore Kingdom's best resort as thanks for saving him. While on vacation there, Erza is haunted by glimpses from her past as a slave forced to build the Tower of Heaven. She and Happy are later abducted by Erza's former friends from the tower, who believe that she had betrayed them, and are taken to the tower to meet Jellal.
34	34	"Jellal"; Transliteration: "Jerāru" (Japanese: ジェラール)	Directed by : Eisuke Hayashi; Storyboarded by : Shinji Ishihira	Masashi Sogo	Takashi Uchida	June 21, 2010	August 14, 2012
As a huge battle begins in the darkness of the Tower of Heaven, Erza's past begins to unfold and the mysterious R-system is revealed.
35	35	"Voice of Darkness"; Transliteration: "Yami no Koe" (Japanese: 闇の声)	Directed by : Masaomi Andō; Storyboarded by : Shinji Ishihira	Shōji Yonemura	Kanta Suzuki	June 28, 2010	August 21, 2012
Erza and Jellal's pasts and their connection is revealed, along with why Erza gained her skills as a wizard.
36	36	"Heaven's Game"; Transliteration: "Rakuen Gēmu" (Japanese: 楽園ゲーム)	Directed by : Shunichi Yoshizawa; Storyboarded by : Hiroyuki Fukushima	Atsuhiro Tomioka	Shinako Okayama	July 5, 2010	August 28, 2012
Following the revolt against Jellal, it is revealed that two of his "comrades" have turned on Erza. Meanwhile, Lucy and Juvia encounter one of Jellal's assassins, Vidaldus Taka, while Natsu fights with another assassin, Fukuro.
37	37	"Armor of the Heart"; Transliteration: "Kokoro no Yoroi" (Japanese: 心の鎧)	Kyōhei Ishiguro	Fumihiko Shimo	Yousuke Kabashima & Aki Nishizaki	July 12, 2010	September 4, 2012
Juvia reaches out to Lucy while being controlled by Vidaldus, inspiring Lucy to defeat their opponent by summoning Aquarius inside Juvia's body to pin him down while they perform a Unison Raid on him. Meanwhile, Fukuro devours Natsu to gain his powers but Gray defeats him, while Siegrain reveals Jellal's plan to resurrect Zeref to gain the Magic Council's support in firing Etherion.
38	38	"Destiny"; Transliteration: "Desutinī" (Japanese: 運命(デスティニー))	Directed by : Yusaku Saotome; Storyboarded by : Shinji Ishihira	Shōji Yonemura	Yuji Ushijima & Teruhiko Yamazaki	July 19, 2010	September 11, 2012
Sho is attacked by Ikuruga, the leader of Trinity Raven, but her attacks release Erza from her card prison. After most of her armors are destroyed by Ikaruga, Erza realizes that wearing armor had been a form of weakness for her, so she dons an outfit of ordinary cloth and strikes Ikaruga down. She then climbs to the top of the Tower of Heaven and, after a brief battle, pins Jellal down. Concerned that Erza won't have it in her heart to kill her childhood friend, Simon sends Natsu to save her.
39	39	"Give Our Prayers to the Sacred Light"; Transliteration: "Sei Naru Hikari ni Inori o" (Japanese: 聖なる光に祈りを)	Hiroyuki Fukushima	Fumihiko Shimo	Toshiharu Murata	July 26, 2010	September 18, 2012
Erza confronts Jellal with the fact that the Tower of Heaven cannot be completed without a massive amount of magic energy, leading Jellal to seemingly concede defeat. Soon after, the Etherion fires on the tower which, to everyone's shock, is absorbed by the tower's true form, an enormous lacrima crystal, preventing the attack from killing anyone. Jellal reveals that he had disguised himself as Siegrain using a magical projection of himself to coerce the Magic Council into firing Etherion at the tower, thereby completing it. He tries using Erza as a sacrifice to resurrect Zeref, but Natsu arrives and rescues her. Natsu fights Jellal, but Jellal outmatches him, so Natsu decides to aim his attacks at the tower and destroy it instead.
40	40	"Titania Falls"; Transliteration: "Titānia, Chiru" (Japanese: 妖精女王(ティターニア)、散る)	Takahiko Kyōgoku	Atsuhiro Tomioka	Satoshi Kimura	August 2, 2010	September 25, 2012
Enraged at the damage done to his tower, and deciding he no longer needs Erza as a sacrifice, Jellal tries to kill both Natsu and Erza, but Simon arrives and defends the two from Jellal's attack, killing him. Natsu becomes infuriated with Jellal at the sight of Erza crying over Simon's death and eats a chunk of lacrima containing Etherion, which greatly increases his physical and magical power, allowing him to defeat Jellal and destroy the tower. Realizing that the tower's remains have now become unstable and threaten to explode, Erza sacrifices herself when she merges with the tower lacrima to rescue Natsu.
The Battle of Fairy Tail Arc
41	41	"Home"	Directed by : Eisuke Hayashi; Storyboarded by : Yoshiyuki Asai	Masashi Sogo	Kan Min Lee	August 9, 2010	October 2, 2012
Erza has a vision of her friends' sadness at her own funeral and regrets her sacrifice. She awakens alive in Natsu's arms, having been rescued from the tower by him. Erza offers her old friends membership in Fairy Tail, but the three decline so they can experience the world without weighing her down, so Erza and her guildmates hold a farewell ceremony for them. The wizards return to Magnolia to find their newly renovated guildhall, with Juvia now a member; to their chagrin, they discover that Gajeel has also joined Fairy Tail at Makarov's request. While attempting to integrate himself into the guild, Gajeel is pestered by Jet and Droy to atone for attacking them as a member of Phantom Lord. He is also attacked by Laxus, who blames Fairy Tail's recent changes for the guild's faltering reputation. After Gajeel defends Levy from Laxus's backlash, Laxus decides to take over the guild by force.
42	42	"Battle of Fairy Tail"; Transliteration: "Batoru obu Fearī Teiru" (Japanese: バトル・オブ・フェアリーテイル)	Kyōhei Ishiguro	Shōji Yonemura	Asako Inayoshi	August 16, 2010	October 9, 2012
The members of Fairy Tail celebrate Magnolia's annual harvest festival, which includes a beauty contest in which Lucy, Erza and other female Fairy Tail members participate. The festival is interrupted by Laxus and his personal bodyguards, the Raijin Tribe, who turn the contest participants into stone and force the other members into joining a battle royale where they must defeat one another to save the girls. To ensure Makarov doesn't interfere, they create a runic barrier around the guildhall which prevents people over 80 years of age from leaving, which somehow affects Natsu as well.
43	43	"Defeat Your Friends to Save Your Friends"; Transliteration: "Tomo no Tame ni Tomo o Ute" (Japanese: 友の為に友を討て)	Directed by : Daisuke Tsukushi; Storyboarded by : Hiroyuki Fukushima	Fumihiko Shimo	Mariko Ito	August 23, 2010	October 16, 2012
The members of Fairy Tail defeat everyone in their guild outside of the guild hall until only Natsu and Gajeel, who remain trapped inside the Fairy Tail guild hall, remain. Fortunately, the petrification spell lifts on Erza faster than normal thanks to her artificial right eye, and Mystogan enters the competition, giving Fairy Tail the chance they need to defeat Laxus.
44	44	"Thunder Palace"; Transliteration: "Kaminari Den" (Japanese: 神鳴殿)	Directed by : Mamoru Enomoto; Storyboarded by : Hiroyuki Fukushima	Atsuhiro Tomioka	Tomoki Mizuno	August 30, 2010	October 23, 2012
Erza battles and defeats Evergreen of the Raijin Tribe, returning the other girls to normal. In retaliation, Laxus surrounds the entire town with Thunder Palace, a cluster of lightning-infused lacrima orbs that threaten to destroy the town, and damage anyone who attacks them. The rescued girls enter the competition, with Lucy facing off against Bickslow of the Raijin Tribe with the assistance of Loke.
45	45	"Advent of Satan"; Transliteration: "Satan Kōrin" (Japanese: サタン降臨)	Directed by : Hazuki Mizumoto; Storyboarded by : Shinji Ishihira	Masashi Sogo	Tomohiro Koyama	September 6, 2010	October 30, 2012
Lucy and Loke defeat Bickslow, leaving only the leader of the Raijin Tribe, Fried Justine, remaining. Cana and Juvia find him but are forced by his rune magic to battle each other until one of them falls first. Believing it to be an act to earn Fairy Tail's complete trust, Juvia instead attacks one of the Thunder Palace lacrima, sacrificing herself so Cana can fight Fried. However, Fried defeats Cana and Elfman. Mirajane's distress over her brother's suffering causes her to activate her latent magic power, Satan Soul, which she uses to defeat Fried in a fury. However, she regains control of herself and convinces him to stop fighting his friends so both members decide to forfeit. Meanwhile, Levy breaks the enchantment preventing Natsu and Gajeel from leaving the guild and the two leave to find Laxus.
46	46	"Clash at Kardia Cathedral!"; Transliteration: "Gekitotsu! Karudia Daiseidō" (Japanese: 激突! カルディア大聖堂)	Directed by : Yusaku Saotome; Storyboarded by : Hiroyuki Fukushima	Shōji Yonemura	Yuji Ushijima & Erika Arakawa	September 13, 2010	November 6, 2012
Porlyusica arrives at Fairy Tail to examine Makarov and remarks that he is close to death, ordering Levy to summon Laxus. Mystogan arrives at Kardia Cathedral and battles Laxus until Natsu and Erza arrive, distracting Mystogan. Laxus blasts his mask off to reveal Jellal's face; however, Mystogan tells Natsu and Erza he is a different person from Jellal, and he disappears. Natsu says he will duel with Laxus instead of Erza, who sets out to destroy all of the Thunder Palace's lacrima crystals at once.
47	47	"Triple Dragons"; Transliteration: "Toripuru Doragon" (Japanese: トリプル ドラゴン)	Directed by : Masaomi Andō & Kyōhei Ishiguro; Storyboarded by : Kyōhei Ishiguro	Fumihiko Shimo	Hirokazu Hisayuki	September 20, 2010	November 13, 2012
Gray contacts the rest of the guild through his telepathic guildmate Warren Rocko so they can help Erza destroy the Thunder Palace. However, the other members are resentful over the Battle of Fairy Tail and argue with each other until Lucy pleads with them to set their fighting aside. After the wizards break the lacrima crystals, getting electrocuted in the process, Gajeel saves Natsu from Laxus, whom they reluctantly team up against. When their attacks prove ineffective, Laxus reveals himself to be a Dragon Slayer and incapacitates them. Frustrated by his plans' failure, Laxus prepares to use Fairy Law to destroy everyone in the city. Levy arrives and tells Laxus about Makarov's condition, but Laxus coldly dismisses her and casts the spell anyway.
48	48	"Fantasia"; Transliteration: "Fantajia" (Japanese: 幻想曲(ファンタジア))	Directed by : Hiroyuki Fukushima; Storyboarded by : Shinji Ishihira	Masashi Sogo	Toshiharu Murata	September 27, 2010	November 20, 2012
After casting Fairy Law, Laxus is shocked to find that Natsu and Gajeel are still alive. Fried confirms that everyone in Magnolia has been unaffected by the spell, signifying that Laxus does not truly hate anyone. In denial of this revelation, Laxus continues to fight Natsu, who finally defeats him after Gajeel takes one of Laxus's attacks for him; the battle is observed from a volcanic region by Igneel, who is chastised by the dragon Grandeeney for allowing Natsu to be seriously injured. Afterwards, a humbled Laxus visits Makarov, who has fully recovered under Porlyusica's care. Makarov reluctantly expels Laxus for endangering the lives of his guildmates, which Laxus accepts. Elsewhere, Ultear contacts her master, Hades, revealing herself to have been the one manipulating Jellal while posing as Zeref's spirit. Fairy Tail resumes their harvest festival celebration by participating in the Fantasia parade, where Makarov and the rest of the guild send a tearful Laxus off with their signature hand gesture, which Laxus first came up with as a child.
49	49	"The Day of the Fateful Encounter"; Transliteration: "Unmei no Deai no Hi" (Japanese: 運命の出会いの日)	Naomichi Yamato	Masashi Sogo	Tomohiro Koyama	October 11, 2010	September 3, 2013
Lucy Heartfilia receives a premonition from Cana Alberona that she will have a "fateful encounter" in the near future. She initially believes this to mean the guild's upcoming interview with Weekly Sorcerer magazine, which she anticipates will lead to a lucrative modeling gig for her, but she is overlooked by the interviewer. In the meantime, she meets an author who asks her to show him around town for inspiration for a novel, and later invites her out to dinner. When her teammates Natsu Dragneel and Happy tell her they have chosen a guild mission specially suited for her, however, she ultimately skips the date to go with her friends; in her place, she sends the boyfriend-seeking Cana, with whom the author becomes smitten. On the train ride, she briefly crosses paths with a blue-haired girl, unaware that this is the fateful encounter Cana prophesied.
50	50	"Special Request: Watch Out for the Guy You Like!"; Transliteration: "Tokubetsu Irai. Kininaru Kare ni Chūi Seyo!" (Japanese: 特別依頼。気になる彼に注意せよ!)	Directed by : Yūji Yanase; Storyboarded by : Hiroyuki Fukushima	Masashi Sogo	Atsushi Soga	October 18, 2010	September 10, 2013
After Mirajane Strauss playfully suggests that Lucy and Natsu would make a good couple, Lucy becomes increasingly paranoid that Natsu has secret feelings for her. When Natsu invites her to the park that evening, she is convinced he will give her a love confession and prepares accordingly. Upon arrival, she is mortified to learn that Natsu simply wants her to summon her celestial spirit Virgo to help him dig up buried treasure. Meanwhile, Juvia Lockser buys a potion that she believes will gain her Gray Fullbuster's full attention, mistaking it for a love potion. The potion instead causes Gray and several other wizards to declare rivalries with the first people and inanimate objects they see. When the effects eventually wear off, Juvia thinks she has not given Gray enough of the potion and makes him drink the entire bottle, causing him to declare rivalry with the horizon itself and run off towards it.
51	51	"Love & Lucky"	Directed by : Masaomi Andō; Storyboarded by : Hirokazu Hisayuki	Masashi Sogo	Hirokazu Hisayuki	October 25, 2010	September 17, 2013
Lucy is stalked by a hooded man whom she quickly recognizes as her estranged father, Jude. Having gone bankrupt after Lucy cut her ties with him, Jude tells her he is planning to start over by finding work at the Love & Lucky trade guild. When he demands an unreasonable sum of money from her, however, she is convinced he has not changed his uncaring behavior and rebuffs him. The next day, Lucy hears news that Love & Lucky is being robbed by the dark guild Naked Mummy. Lucy rushes to the guild to save Jude, single-handedly defeating all of the Naked Mummy wizards there. When she cannot find Jude, she sees him arriving late on foot, having been unable to afford a carriage ride following their fight. Jude is humbled to realize that Lucy still cares about him, and after he divulges how he and her mother named Lucy after the Love & Lucky sign with the missing letter "K", the two part on friendlier terms.
Nirvana Arc
52	52	"Allied Forces, Assemble!"; Transliteration: "Rengōgun, Shūketsu!" (Japanese: 連合軍、集結!)	Yusaku Saotome	Masashi Sogo	Yuji Ushijima & Masanori Iizuka	November 1, 2010	September 24, 2013
In response to an increase in dark guild activity, Makarov Dreyar announces that Fairy Tail is to coalesce with three other official guilds—Blue Pegasus, Lamia Scale, and Cait Shelter—in an alliance against the Oración Seis, one of the three Balam Alliance guilds with jurisdiction over the kingdom's dark guild network. Natsu and his team are selected to represent their guild, and they rendezvous with their allies from Blue Pegasus and Lamia Scale: Ichiya Vandalay Kotobuki and his entourage, the Tri-men, the former of whom Erza Scarlet is repulsed by; and Lyon Vastia and Sherry Blendy, two of Fairy Tail's old enemies, who are accompanied by the legendary Wizard Saint Jura Neekis. The delegates learn that Cait Shelter has only sent a single representative: the blue-haired girl, Wendy Marvell, whose name Natsu recognizes.
53	53	"Enter the Oración Seis!"; Transliteration: "Orashion Seisu Arawaru!" (Japanese: 六魔将軍(オラシオンセイス)現る!)	Directed by : Eisuke Hayashi; Storyboarded by : Shinji Ishihira	Masashi Sogo	Kan Min Lee	November 8, 2010	October 1, 2013
Wendy meekly introduces herself to the rest of the alliance, while Happy instantly becomes smitten with her companion and caretaker Carla, a female talking cat similar to himself. The alliance reviews the six Oración Seis' intention to uncover Nirvana, an ancient destructive spell, before discussing their own attack strategy using Blue Pegasus's bomber airship Christina. However, their plan is undermined by Oración Seis member Angel, who incapacitates Jura and Ichiya, while she and the rest of her guild blow up Christina and defeat the remaining alliance members in a one-sided fight. The Seis' leader, Brain, prepares to annihilate the alliance members, but halts his attack upon recognizing Wendy.
54	54	"Maiden of the Sky"; Transliteration: "Tenkū no Miko" (Japanese: 天空の巫女)	Directed by : Noriaki Saito; Storyboarded by : Hiroyuki Fukushima	Fumihiko Shimo	Kang Won Kim & Jung-Duk Seo	November 15, 2010	October 8, 2013
Brain kidnaps Wendy, unwittingly taking Happy as well, before Jura returns in time to prevent him from killing the other alliance members. The allies tend to Erza, who has been bitten by Oración Seis member Cobra's venomous snake, Cubellios. As the alliance argues over her request to sever her infected arm, Carla reveals Wendy to be a dragon slayer who specializes in healing magic that can save Erza's life. The allies prepare to infiltrate the Oración Seis' base and rescue Wendy. While Natsu and Gray are inhibited by vengeful members of Naked Mummy, Wendy is instructed by Brain to revive a comatose Jellal Fernandez, whom Brain identifies as a benefactor from Wendy's past.
55	55	"The Girl and the Ghost"; Transliteration: "Shōjo to Bōrei" (Japanese: 少女と亡霊)	Mamoru Enomoto	Shoji Yonemura	Takashi Uchida	November 22, 2010	October 15, 2013
Despite being aware of Jellal's past, Wendy reluctantly revives him because she mysteriously confesses she owes him her life. Nearing the base, Gray stays behind to fight Oración Seis wizard Racer while Natsu and Carla goes on to rescue Wendy and Happy. Though shocked to find Jellal alive, Natsu and his friends leave in order to save Erza.
56	56	"Dead Grand Prix"; Transliteration: "Deddo Guran Puri" (Japanese: デッドGP(グランプリ))	Directed by : Yusaku Saotome; Storyboarded by : Shinji Ishihira	Atsuhiro Tomioka	Yuji Ushijima & Masayuki Tanaka	November 29, 2010	October 22, 2013
Hibiki directs Natsu on how to find Erza. Gray faces off against Racer with difficulty, despite help from Lyon and Sherry. When Lyon sacrifices himself to ensure Racer's defeat, Sherry is left heartbroken. Meanwhile, Brain senses the loss of Racer and awakens the wizard Midnight.
57	57	"Darkness"; Transliteration: "Yami" (Japanese: 闇)	Naomichi Yamato	Masashi Sogo	Tomohiro Koyama	December 6, 2010	October 29, 2013
While Jura fights Hot Eye, Cobra follows Jellal, whose mind he cannot read, in hopes of finding Nirvana. Erza secretly goes off to find Jellal after she is healed by Wendy, prompting Natsu to find Jellal to prevent him from meeting Erza. Hibiki reveals that Nirvana has the power to invert light and dark within people, thus people of light who feel powerful negative emotion fall into darkness. Unfortunately, Nirvana has already begun to affect everyone in the area, including Wendy, Sherry, Hot Eye, Ren, Midnight, and Eve.
58	58	"Celestial Skirmish"; Transliteration: "Seirei Gassen" (Japanese: 星霊合戦)	Directed by : Masayuki Ōzeki; Storyboarded by : Shinji Ishihira	Fumihiko Shimo	Atsushi Soga	December 13, 2010	November 5, 2013
Lucy, Hibiki, Wendy, Happy, and Carla pursue Natsu, who has been defeated by an uncharacteristic Gray - who turns out to be the Celestial Spirit Gemini, contracted to Oración Seis wizard Angel. Angel's knowledge of Celestial Spirit relationships trumps Lucy's attempts to protect her friends, until Hibiki provides Lucy with the powerful Urano Metria spell.
59	59	"Jellal of Days Gone By"; Transliteration: "Tsuioku no Jerāru" (Japanese: 追憶のジェラール)	Directed by : Eisuke Hayashi; Storyboarded by : Hiroyuki Fukushima	Masashi Sogo	Kan Min Lee	December 20, 2010	November 12, 2013
Angel is defeated and Natsu together with Lucy end up falling down a giant waterfall, where they reunite with Gray, Lyon, and Sherry. Wendy reveals to Carla her past concerning Jellal and how she came to Cait Shelter. Meanwhile, Erza finds an amnesiac Jellal at the site of Nirvana. Seeing the pain he has caused her, Jellal places a self-destructive magic upon himself.
60	60	"March of Destruction"; Transliteration: "Hametsu no Kōshin" (Japanese: 破滅の行進)	Directed by : Masaomi Andō; Storyboarded by : Yoshiyuki Sanami	Shoji Yonemura	Hirokazu Hisayuki	December 27, 2010	November 19, 2013
Despite Jellal's attempts to end everything with his death, Brain takes control of Nirvana and activates its second stage - an ancient city that begins marching at his order towards Cait Shelter. Natsu, Lucy, Happy, and Gray rush off to defeat it. When Natsu and Happy try to get ahead, they are forced into an aerial battle against Cobra. Meanwhile, Erza saves Jellal and convinces him to live for the future, and they begin to devise a plan to destroy Nirvana.
61	61	"Super Aerial Battle: Natsu vs. Cobra!"; Transliteration: "Chōkūchūsen! Natsu bāsasu Kobura" (Japanese: 超空中戦! ナツ vs. コブラ)	Directed by : Hazuki Mizumoto; Storyboarded by : Shinji Ishihira	Atsuhiro Tomioka	Hiroki Ikeshita	January 10, 2011	November 26, 2013
Because Cobra can predict all his moves, Natsu can't gain the upper hand until he fights instinctively, where it is revealed that Cobra is a Dragon Slayer. Midnight shows up in front of Lucy, Gray, Jura and Hot Eye. Concluding that Hot Eye betrayed his father, Midnight engages in a fight with him. In a last ditch attempt, Natsu uses his scream to defeat Cobra because of his pride in his hearing skills.
62	62	"Wizard Saint Jura"; Transliteration: "Seiten no Jura" (Japanese: 聖十(せいてん)のジュラ)	Yusaku Saotome	Masashi Sogo	Yuji Ushijima & Masanori Iizuka	January 17, 2011	December 3, 2013
Cobra is injured by Brain for his failure, while Jura demonstrates his power as one of the Ten Wizard Saints and defeats Brain, whose final prayer is for Midnight not to fall. Natsu and the others continue their efforts to stop Nirvana's advance on Cait Shelter, not realizing that Nirvana will not stop as long as Midnight is there.
63	63	"Your Words"; Transliteration: "Kimi no Kotoba koso" (Japanese: 君の言葉こそ)	Directed by : Hiroshi Kimura; Storyboarded by : Hiroyuki Fukushima	Masashi Sogo	Seiji Kishimoto	January 24, 2011	December 10, 2013
The staff Brain had before reveals his identity as the last member of Oracion Seis - the 7th, much to their confusion - and the reason behind their intentions of destroying the Cait Shelter Guild. Erza determines the true form of Midnight's magic and prepares to fight him again. Meanwhile, Wendy searches for Jellal in order to find the necessary information that will help Natsu and the others stop Nirvana.
64	64	"Zero" (Japanese: ゼロ)	Directed by : Yasuo Iwamoto; Storyboarded by : Shinji Ishihira	Masashi Sogo	Ryo Haga & Yūya Takahashi	January 31, 2011	December 17, 2013
Erza manages to overcome Midnight's illusory magic, while Natsu, Lucy, Happy, and Gray confront Brain's staff, Klodoa. Realizing Midnight's defeat, Klodoa explains that Brain has an alternate destructive personality called Zero that was kept sealed by the members of the Oración Seis using body link magic. Erza, Jellal, Wendy and Carla make haste as Zero initiates Nirvana to fire upon Cait Shelter.
65	65	"From Pegasus to Fairies"; Transliteration: "Tenma kara Yōsei-tachi e" (Japanese: 天馬から妖精たちへ)	Directed by : Masayuki Ōzeki; Storyboarded by : Hiroyuki Fukushima	Atsuhiro Tomioka	Atsushi Soga	February 7, 2011	December 24, 2013
As Zero fires on Cait Shelter, Blue Pegasus's ship Christina, held together by Lyon, Sherry, and Ren, destroy one of Nirvana's legs and cause it to miss. Hibiki relays the details of the plan to stop Nirvana: within 20 minutes, the six legs of Nirvana must be destroyed at the same time. As Natsu goes to the location of first Lacrima to fight Zero, Jellal follows him after regaining some of his memory.
66	66	"The Power of Feelings"; Transliteration: "Omoi no Chikara" (Japanese: 想いの力)	Naomichi Yamato	Fumihiko Shimo	Tomohiro Koyama	February 14, 2011	December 31, 2013
Having told Wendy to destroy the sixth Lacrima in his place, Jellal appears at the first Lacrima and gives Natsu the "Flame of Rebuke". Natsu consumes the flame and enters Dragon Force for his fight against Zero and they power up for the final blow. Meanwhile, everyone reaches their respective destinations and wait for the right moment to strike.
67	67	"I'm With You"; Transliteration: "Watashi ga Tsuiteiru" (Japanese: 私がついている)	Directed by : Eisuke Hayashi; Storyboarded by : Shinji Ishihira	Shoji Yonemura	Kan Min Lee	February 21, 2011	January 7, 2014
As everyone gathers their strength for the final blow, Natsu is consumed by Zero's "Genesis Zero" attack. As he floats in the world of nothing, Igneel's voice speaks to him and he breaks free, defeating Zero and manages to destroy Nirvana's legs along with his allies, resulting in Nirvana's destruction.
68	68	"A Guild for One"; Transliteration: "Tatta Hitori no Tame no Girudo" (Japanese: たった一人の為のギルド)	Yusaku Saotome	Masashi Sogo	Yuji Ushijima & Akiko Matsuo	February 28, 2011	January 14, 2014
Agents from the Magic Council dispatched to the site of Nirvana's fall arrest Jellal; when everyone else resists, Erza stops them and urges the officials to take Jellal away, though she is devastated by the outcome. As everyone recovers at Cait Shelter, it is revealed that the entire guild was an illusion created by the spirit of its guild master for Wendy's sake. With Nirvana's destruction, the spirit has fulfilled its purpose and Cait Shelter vanishes. As Wendy is left behind crying, Erza invites her to join Fairy Tail.
Daphne Arc
69	69	"Call of the Dragon"; Transliteration: "Ryū no Izanai" (Japanese: 竜の誘い)	Directed by : Noriaki Saito; Storyboarded by : Hiroyuki Fukushima	Atsuhiro Tomioka	Seok Pyo Hong	March 7, 2011	January 21, 2014
Everyone returns to their respective guilds, and Wendy and Carla officially become members of Fairy Tail. When Gray tells Natsu rumours of a woman, Daphne, who claims to have met a dragon, Natsu and Wendy set off to find her. However, they are dismayed that it is a trap and that Gray is inexplicably in league with Daphne. Meanwhile, Erza encounters a monster that uses the same kind of magic as her.
70	70	"Natsu vs. Gray!!"; Transliteration: "Natsu bāsasu Gurei!!" (Japanese: ナツ vs. グレイ!!)	Directed by : Mamoru Enomoto; Storyboarded by : Hiroyuki Fukushima	Fumihiko Shimo	Hiroki Ikeshita	March 14, 2011	January 28, 2014
Natsu fights with Gray, who refuses to explain why he helped Daphne capture him. Lucy and Erza set off to save Natsu and Wendy, but encounter more Lizardmen, artificial monsters created by Daphne to mimic their opponents' magic. Eventually Natsu is subdued and used by Daphne to power her artificial dragon, the Dragonoid.
71	71	"Friendship Overcomes the Dead"; Transliteration: "Tomo wa Shikabane o Koete" (Japanese: 友は屍を越えて)	Masaomi Andō	Shoji Yonemura	Noriko Ogura	March 21, 2011	February 4, 2014
Elfman, Macao and Wakaba arrive to subdue Gray and bring him back to Fairy Tail, while Daphne flies towards Magnolia in her fully powered Dragonoid, intending to destroy the city. The members of Fairy Tail all fight against the Dragonoid before Natsu tells them to destroy him with it.
72	72	"A Fairy Tail Wizard"; Transliteration: "Fearī Teiru no Madōshi" (Japanese: フェアリーテイルの魔導士)	Directed by : Yasuo Iwamoto; Storyboarded by : Shinji Ishihira	Masashi Sogo	Yūya Takahashi & Kiryou Iwamoto	March 28, 2011	February 11, 2014
Gray explains to Makarov that he helped Daphne capture Natsu so that Natsu could destroy her Dragonoid from within and fulfill a forgotten promise to lift a curse Daphne cast to make the inhabitants of a town invisible. With help from the wizards of Fairy Tail, Natsu overloads the Dragonoid and defeats Daphne, lifting the curse she placed on the city.
Standalone side stories
73	73	"Rainbow Cherry Blossoms"; Transliteration: "Niji no Sakura" (Japanese: 虹の桜)	Directed by : Naomichi Yamato; Storyboarded by : Shinji Ishihira	Masashi Sogo	Tomohiro Koyama	April 4, 2011	May 13, 2014
When Lucy Heartfilia catches a cold after a mission in the mountains with Natsu Dragneel and their friends, she is unable to go to Fairy Tail's annual flower watching. Because Natsu can't have fun knowing Lucy has been left out, he and Happy uproot a cherry tree so that Lucy can see it.
74	74	"Wendy's First Big Job!?"; Transliteration: "Wendi, Hajimete no Ōshigoto!?" (Japanese: ウェンディ、初めての大仕事!?)	Yusaku Saotome	Fumihiko Shimo	Yuji Ushijima & Masayuki Tanaka	April 11, 2011	May 20, 2014
For Wendy's first job chosen by Mirajane, she finds work at the theatre troupe that once hired Natsu, Lucy, Happy, Gray, and Erza. However, an argument with Carla means that she is going to Onibus alone but under Makarov's guidance, Happy and Fried joins in her journey. When Erza and Lucy, then later Natsu (oblivious) learn the train to Onibus isn't working, everyone rushes to help Wendy. However, when they all arrive in Onibus, they learn that their services were not needed and collapse in despair; Wendy's first big job instead is moving her friends out of the way.
75	75	"24-Hour Endurance Road Race"; Transliteration: "Nijūyon Jikan Taikyū Rōdo Rēsu" (Japanese: 24時間耐久ロードレース)	Directed by : Nanako Shimazaki; Storyboarded by : Hiroyuki Fukushima	Atsuhiro Tomioka	Karuta Sorashima	April 16, 2011	May 27, 2014
A 24 hour race begins as all the Fairy Tail members race to get Wyvern Scales from the top of Mt. Ivor and return to the starting line. No one is allowed to drop out and flying magic is not permitted, though that doesn't dampen Happy's determination to win.
Edolas Arc
76	76	"Gildarts"; Transliteration: "Girudātsu" (Japanese: ギルダーツ)	Directed by : Masaomi Andō; Storyboarded by : Shinji Ishihira	Shoji Yonemura	Satoshi Hata	April 23, 2011	June 3, 2014
Gildarts has finally come back to Fairy Tail after three years on a hundred-year quest and has news for Natsu concerning Igneel.
77	77	"Earth Land"; Transliteration: "Āsu Rando" (Japanese: アースランド)	Directed by : Tsuyoshi Tobita; Storyboarded by : Hiroyuki Fukushima	Masashi Sogo	Nobuharu Ishido	April 30, 2011	June 10, 2014
Wendy finally meets Mystogan, whom she had known as Jellal in her childhood. In spite of his best efforts, he reveals he is unable to stop Anima, a powerful magic that will destroy all of Magnolia. As Wendy warn Fairy Tail of its impending demise, a vortex appears from the sky and the city is sucked into it, leaving only Wendy, Natsu, Happy, and Carla behind.
78	78	"Edolas"; Transliteration: "Edorasu" (Japanese: エドラス)	Directed by : Kazunobu Fuseki; Storyboarded by : Shinji Ishihira	Masashi Sogo	Hiroki Ikeshita	May 7, 2011	June 17, 2014
After the disappearance of Magnolia and Fairy Tail, Carla reveals that everything has been taken to an alternate world - Edolas, where she and Happy originally came from. Because Natsu and Wendy are Dragonslayers, they were immune to the Anima and were regarded as a threat to Edolas; thus, Carla and Happy were sent to destroy them. Determined to rescue their friends, Natsu, Wendy, and Happy follow Carla's lead to reach Edolas, where they discover the Edolas version of Fairy Tail.
79	79	"Fairy Hunter"; Transliteration: "Yōsei Gari" (Japanese: 妖精狩り)	Directed by : Masaomi Andō; Storyboarded by : Shinji Ishihira	Masashi Sogo	Hirokazu Hisayuki	May 14, 2011	June 24, 2014
Natsu, Wendy, Carla and Happy are stunned to discover a very different version of Fairy Tail in Edolas, but it is clear that they are not the same Fairy Tail they know and love. However, before any questions can be answered, the Edolas Fairy Tail is attacked by the "Fairy Hunter", Erza Nightwalker.
80	80	"Key of Hope"; Transliteration: "Kibō no Kagi" (Japanese: 希望の鍵)	Naomichi Yamato	Shoji Yonemura	Tomohiro Koyama	May 21, 2011	July 1, 2014
After narrowly fleeing from Erza Nightwalker, Natsu's group decides to head to the capital of Edolas on their own to save their friends, despite warnings from the Edolas Fairy Tail. However, they soon find themselves guided by Lucy Ashley, Lucy's Edolas counterpart, and Natsu and Wendy are shocked to discover that their magic does not work in Edolas. Instead, they are forced to use magic weapons that's forbidden by the king that the Fairy Tail use in Edolas.
81	81	"Fireball"; Transliteration: "Faiabōru" (Japanese: ファイアボール)	Directed by : Noriaki Saito; Storyboarded by : Hiroyuki Fukushima	Fumihiko Shimo	Suk Pyo Song & Ryo Haga	May 28, 2011	July 8, 2014
In the capital, Natsu and Wendy are surprised to find their Lucy alive and fully capable of using her magic. After Edolas Lucy and Earth-land Lucy become acquainted with one another, Natsu's group escapes from the Royal Army and takes refuge in a hotel. When their plan to sneak aboard a Royal Army airship fails, they are saved by the timely arrival of the driver of a 4-wheeled vehicle: the Edolas version of Natsu.
82	82	"Welcome Home"; Transliteration: "Okaerinasaimase" (Japanese: おかえりなさいませ)	Kan Min Lee	Atsuhiro Tomioka	Toshiharu Murata	June 4, 2011	July 15, 2014
Natsu and his friends reach the Royal City, where an enormous lacrima made of the magical energy of Magnolia is on display. To save their friends, Carla reveals that she has had information about Edolas flowing into her head since they arrived, and the group devises a plan based on getting close to the Edolas king, Faust, and having Lucy use Gemini to learn how to transform the lacrima back. Their plan is foiled when they are ambushed by Nightwalker, whose forces exalt Happy and Carla as beings known as "Exceed".
83	83	"Extalia"; Transliteration: "Ekusutaria" (Japanese: エクスタリア)	Directed by : Hiroshi Kimura; Storyboarded by : Hiroyuki Fukushima	Masashi Sogo	Eiichi Tokura & Hiromi Sakamoto	June 11, 2011	July 22, 2014
Because Natsu and Wendy are Dragonslayers, they are detained and wind up discovering a secret about the Exceed. Happy and Carla are brought to Extalia, the home of the Exceed, and learn the reason why they were actually sent to Earth-land. Meanwhile, Edolas Gajeel plans a distraction so Earth-land Gajeel can attempt to destroy the lacrima that holds his friends.
84	84	"Fly, to Our Friends!"; Transliteration: "Tobe! Tomo no Moto ni!" (Japanese: 飛べ! 友のもとに!)	Directed by : Yusaku Saotome; Storyboarded by : Shinji Ishihira	Masashi Sogo	Yuji Ushijima & Akiko Matsuo	June 18, 2011	July 29, 2014
After hearing about their mission, Happy and Carla flee Extalia and end up with two mysterious cats, Lucky and Marl, whose egg has previously been taken by the queen to be used in the Dragonslayer Extermination Project. Though they are shaken by what they think they have done, they resolve to save their friends.
85	85	"Code ETD"; Transliteration: "Kōdo Ī-Tī-Dī" (Japanese: コードETD)	Directed by : Nanako Shimazaki; Storyboarded by : Susumu Nishizawa	Fumihiko Shimo	Seiji Kishimoto	June 25, 2011	August 5, 2014
When Lucy tries appealing to Nightwalker to save her friends, she instead attempts to drop Lucy out of a tower, though Lucy is rescued by Happy and Carla's timely arrival. Meanwhile, Faust activates Code ETD (Exceed Total Destruction) to trap the Exceeds that were pursuing Carla and Happy in Lacrima and declares war on Extalia. Nightwalker ambushes Lucy, Happy, and Carla, but the Earth-land Erza and Gray suddenly appear to rescue their comrades.
86	86	"Erza vs. Erza"; Transliteration: "Eruza bāsasu Eruza" (Japanese: エルザ vs. エルザ)	Directed by : Mamoru Enomoto; Storyboarded by : Hiroyuki Fukushima	Atsuhiro Tomioka	Satoshi Hata	July 2, 2011	August 12, 2014
While Erza Scarlet holds off Erza Nightwalker, Lucy and the others go to rescue Natsu and Wendy, while Happy is sent to find Gajeel, as dragon slayers can inherently reverse the magic that transformed everyone else into lacrima. However, Gajeel's attempt to free everyone is hindered by the Exceed Panther Lily, a captain of the Edolas Army. Faust begins his plan to use the Dragon Chain Cannon to fuse the Magnolia lacrima into Extalia and destroy them together so that magic can rain upon Edolas forever.
87	87	"We're Talking About Lives Here!!!!"; Transliteration: "Inochi Darō ga!!!!" (Japanese: 命だろーが!!!!)	Directed by : Tsuyoshi Tobita; Storyboarded by : Hiroyuki Fukushima	Shoji Yonemura	Nobuharu Ishido	July 9, 2011	August 19, 2014
Natsu, Gray, and Lucy's attempt to reach the Faust is held up by the Royal Army Captains Hughes and Sugarboy. When the servant Coco steals the key to the Dragon Chain Cannon to save Pantherlily and Extalia, she is pursued by the Royal Army's Chief of Staff Byro and runs into Lucy, fleeing from monsters. As Coco considers giving the key to Lucy, Lucy and Byro engage in battle due to a simple misunderstanding over her keys.
88	88	"For Pride's Sake, the River of Stars"; Transliteration: "Hoshi no Taiga wa Hokori no Tame ni" (Japanese: 星の大河は誇りの為に)	Directed by : Kazunobu Fuseki; Storyboarded by : Shinji Ishihira	Masashi Sogo	Hiroki Ikeshita	July 16, 2011	August 26, 2014
After Lucy calls multiple spirits in a row to fight Byro, her magic is quickly drained, though Virgo gives Lucy a Spirit World whip that can extend and contract to help in the fight as Byro turns into an octopus. When Byro is defeated by the timely arrival of Natsu, Coco gives the key to Lucy, but it is stolen by Sugarboy, forcing Gray to pursue him. Gray defeats Sugarboy and destroys the key after learning its purpose, as he can create another key from ice.
89	89	"The Apocalyptic Dragon Chain Cannon"; Transliteration: "Shūen no Ryūsahō" (Japanese: 終焉の竜鎖砲)	Directed by : Yasuo Iwamoto; Storyboarded by : Shinji Ishihira	Masashi Sogo	Kiryou Iwamoto & Seok Pyo Hong	July 23, 2011	September 2, 2014
Nightwalker captures both Gray and Natsu and brings them before Faust, whom she quickly takes hostage, revealing herself as Erza Scarlet. Erza's plan to force the guards to redirect the cannon goes awry when the real Nightwalker appears.
90	90	"The Boy Back Then"; Transliteration: "Ano Toki no Shōnen" (Japanese: あの時の少年)	Masaomi Andō	Masashi Sogo	Kenji Hattori	July 30, 2011	September 9, 2014
On Extalia, Chagot - the queen of the Exceeds - reveals that her divine image was a lie perpetuated by the Elders to protect the Exceeds from humans, but her inner strength persuades the Exceeds to try saving Extalia with their own strength. When the lacrima suddenly disappears, Mystogan arrives to explain that he has restored Magnolia and thanks Panther Lily for saving his life while Lily reveals Mystogan is Prince Jellal of Edolas.
91	91	"Dragon Sense"	Directed by : Yoshitaka Makino; Storyboarded by : Shinji Ishihira	Shoji Yonemura	Jun Hanzawa, Osamu Ōkubo & Masahiro Sekiguchi	August 6, 2011	September 16, 2014
The Earth-land wizards succeed in preventing Extalia's destruction, but the battle is not over. Nightwalker leads an ambush by the Edolas Royal Army, while Faust unleashes a super-powerful mechanical dragon, Droma Anim. The dragon slayers confront the king, Scarlet faces off against Nightwalker, the others battle the army while Mystogan and Panther Lily attend to other matters.
92	92	"O Living Ones"; Transliteration: "Ikiru Monotachi yo" (Japanese: 生きる者たちよ)	Directed by : Hiroshi Tamada; Storyboarded by : Hiroyuki Fukushima	Fumihiko Shimo	Hyung Woo Shin & Michinori Shiga	August 13, 2011	September 23, 2014
The battles against the Edolas Royal Kingdom rages on. The army, Nightwalker and the king himself are fighting against the Earth-land wizards who wish to recover their friends. Meanwhile, Edolas Fairy Tail tries to come to a decision on which side they will choose.
93	93	"I'm Standing Right Here"; Transliteration: "Ore wa Koko ni Tatteiru" (Japanese: オレはここに立っている)	Naomichi Yamato	Atsuhiro Tomioka	Tomohiro Koyama	August 20, 2011	September 30, 2014
In the midst of the exhausting battle between the Edolas army and the members of Fairy Tail in both worlds, the Edolas combatants panic upon realizing their magic is disappearing thanks to Mystogan reversing Anima. However, to ensure the stability of Edolas, Mystogan declares himself a villain to Edolas and orders Panther Lily to kill him and emerge as a hero amongst the people.
94	94	"Bye-Bye Edolas"; Transliteration: "Baibai Edorasu" (Japanese: バイバイ エドラス)	Directed by : Mamoru Enomoto; Storyboarded by : Yoshiyuki Asai	Masashi Sogo	Satoshi Hata	August 27, 2011	October 7, 2014
Out of devotion, Panther Lily refuses to accept Mystogan's plan, but they soon find that Natsu, Wendy, and Gajeel have captured Faust and begun a riot. When Mystogan confronts Natsu and defeats him, Mystogan is revealed to be the Prince of Edolas to the people. As the reversed Anima successfully teleports the Earth-land wizards and the Exceed to Earth-land, everyone says their goodbyes and disappears, while Mystogan stays behind, heralded as the new leader of Edolas.
95	95	"Lisanna"; Transliteration: "Risāna" (Japanese: リサーナ)	Directed by : Kazunobu Fuseki; Storyboarded by : Shinji Ishihira	Masashi Sogo	Hiroki Ikeshita	September 3, 2011	October 14, 2014
After returning to Earth-land, the Fairy Tail wizards discover that Magnolia has been restored and the Exceed have followed them as well. Chagot and her court explain to the wizards that the queen, who possesses precognitive powers, had visions of Extalia's destruction and evacuated 100 eggs to Earth-land for protection, revealing Carla and Happy's "mission" to be a cover-up based on future events to prevent a panic. Chagot further reveals that Carla possesses the same powers, which her memories of her "mission" are derived from, although Chagot withholds telling Carla that she inherited these powers from her as her daughter. Carla reluctantly forgives the Exceed, who go their separate ways to find the remaining Exceed children. Panther Lily appears in a shrunken form and is accepted into the guild; to the wizards' surprise, he has Lisanna from Edolas as a captive. The wizards realize she is actually their guildmate Lisanna Strauss from Earth-land; she reveals that she actually survived when she was caught in an Anima portal, living in Edolas with the guild until the reversal of Anima forced her to return. Lisanna later reunites with Mirajane and Elfman.
Tenrou Island Arc
96	96	"He Who Extinguishes Life"; Transliteration: "Inochi o Kesumono" (Japanese: 生命(いのち)を消す者)	Directed by : Tsuyoshi Tobita; Storyboarded by : Shinji Ishihira	Masashi Sogo	Nobuharu Ishido	September 10, 2011	October 21, 2014
The people of Edolas rebuild their kingdom to accommodate for the loss of magic; Edolas's Fairy Tail decides to relocate closer to the kingdom, towing their guildhall by hand, while Mystogan exiles Faust and sentences the military commanders to aid in the repair effort. In Earth-land, Lisanna's return is celebrated by the rest of Fairy Tail, while Natsu and his friends recount their experiences in Edolas to their guildmates. Meanwhile, a black-robed youth is attacked by a pack of wolves, but he unwillingly kills them along with every living thing around himself; the youth then sorrowfully says he wants to see Natsu.
97	97	"Best Partners"; Transliteration: "Besuto Pātonā" (Japanese: ベストパートナー)	Directed by : Shunichi Yoshizawa; Storyboarded by : Shinji Ishihira	Masashi Sogo	Takashi Uchida	September 17, 2011	October 28, 2014
Natsu, Gray, Juvia, Elfman, Cana, Fried, Levy, and Mystogan's disciple Mest are selected to participate in Fairy Tail's annual S-Class promotion exam, and are instructed to choose a partner to accompany them during the exam. Natsu partners with Happy, Gray with Loke, Juvia with Lisanna, Elfman with Evergreen, Fried with Bickslow, Levy with Gajeel, and Mest with Wendy. During this time, Cana tells Lucy that she intends to leave the guild if she fails the upcoming exam. After learning of Cana's reasons for doing so, Lucy offers to become Cana's partner. Meanwhile, Carla experiences disturbing visions.
98	98	"Who's the Lucky One?"; Transliteration: "Ungaii no wa Dare?" (Japanese: 運がいいのは誰?)	Directed by : Yusaku Saotome; Storyboarded by : Hiroyuki Fukushima	Masashi Sogo	Yuji Ushijima & Akiko Matsuo	September 24, 2011	November 4, 2014
Having traveled to Sirius Island, Fairy Tail's sacred ground, the exam participants each take one of eight routes that will lead to the next stage of the exam. Most of these routes either pit the participants against each other or one of Fairy Tail's S-Class wizards, who they must defeat in order to advance. Lucy and Cana are pitted against Fried and Bickslow, whom they fear they stand no chance against. However, Fried throws the battle by pretending to be distracted by their swimsuits, allowing Cana to defeat him using illusions of scantily dressed women. Meanwhile, Natsu takes the route he believes will pit him against Erza, but is ecstatic to find Gildarts waiting for him instead.
99	99	"Natsu vs. Gildarts"; Transliteration: "Natsu bāsasu Girudātsu" (Japanese: ナツ vs. ギルダーツ)	Directed by : Noriaki Saito; Storyboarded by : Shinji Ishihira	Masashi Sogo	Kōsuke Yoshida & Ryo Haga	October 1, 2011	November 11, 2014
Juvia and Lisanna are pitted against Erza, while Elfman and Evergreen are pitted against Mirajane. Meanwhile, Natsu enthusiastically fights Gildarts, with a series of flashbacks detailing how Natsu has never defeated him since childhood. Just when Natsu believes he has gained the upper hand, Gildarts unleashes an immense aura of magical power, prompting Natsu to surrender in fear. Gildarts teaches Natsu the benefits that fear has in order for him to grow stronger, and allows him to pass.
100	100	"Mest"; Transliteration: "Mesuto" (Japanese: メスト)	Directed by : Yasushi Muroya; Storyboarded by : Hiroyuki Fukushima	Shoji Yonemura	Shiori Mikuni	October 8, 2011	November 18, 2014
After being defeated by Gray and Loke, Mest convinces Wendy to help him look for a secret he says is hidden on the island. Worried about Wendy, Carla arrives on Sirius Island together with Panther Lily, who doubts Mest's claims of being Mystogan's disciple and suspects that Mest is not a member of Fairy Tail. Meanwhile, Levy and Gajeel pass through the only route devoid of opponents, Elfman and Evergreen defeat Mirajane, and Juvia and Lisanna lose against Erza. For the second part of the exam, the remaining participants are instructed by Makarov to search the island for the grave of Fairy Tail's founding master Mavis. During their search, Elfman and Evergreen are seriously injured by the black-robed youth, though Natsu arrives in time to save his friends.
101	101	"Black Wizard"; Transliteration: "Kuro Madōshi" (Japanese: 黒魔導士)	Directed by : Hiroshi Kimura; Storyboarded by : Shinji Ishihira	Fumihiko Shimo	Seiji Kishimoto	October 15, 2011	November 25, 2014
Natsu Dragneel encounters the black-robed wizard, who is interrupting Fairy Tail's S-Class promotional trial on Sirius Island. However, Zeref defeats Natsu in a duel, leaving him wounded. Despite the encounter, the participants resolve to continue their exam and split up. Meanwhile, Grimoire Heart travels to Sirius Island in search of the wizard in black, who is revealed to be the infamous dark wizard Zeref. After separating from Gajeel Redfox because of an argument, Levy McGarden is attacked by Grimoire Heart members Yomazu and Kawazu. Gajeel rescues her, and the two prepare to engage in a duel.
102	102	"Iron Soul"; Transliteration: "Tetsu no Tamashii" (Japanese: 鉄の魂)	Masaomi Andō	Atsuhiro Tomioka	Masanori Iizuka	October 22, 2011	December 2, 2014
Gajeel and Levy fight Yomazu and Kawazu, who are scouting the island to kill Fairy Tail wizards. After being seriously wounded, Gajeel sends Levy to warn their guildmates of Grimoire Heart's attack. Remembering Fairy Tail master Makarov Dreyar's willingness to guide him despite his bringing harm to Fairy Tail, Gajeel gains morale and defeats the two scouts. Meanwhile, Erza Scarlet and Juvia Lockser find Levy and interrogate Yomazu, who warns them about Grimoire Heart's intentions. Erza lights a beacon signifying the exam's suspension and the enemy attack, but Yomazu tells her that one of the Seven Kin of Purgatory, Grimoire Heart's elite team, is already on the island. Meanwhile, Carla and Panther Lily find Wendy Marvell and her exam partner, Mest Gryder, whom Lily deduces is not a member of Fairy Tail as he claims to be.
103	103	"Makarov Charges"; Transliteration: "Shingeki no Makarofu" (Japanese: 進撃のマカロフ)	Naomichi Yamato	Masashi Sogo	Tomohiro Koyama	October 29, 2011	December 9, 2014
While Lily confronts him over his identity, Mest rescues Wendy from an attack by Azuma, one of the Seven Kin. Mest reveals himself to be a Magic Council agent named Doranbalt, who is searching for incriminating evidence against Fairy Tail to disband the guild. After Azuma destroys the fleet of council ships summoned by Doranbalt for support, Wendy demands Doranbalt's assistance in defeating him; however, they and Lily are overpowered and nearly killed. Makarov prepares to repel Grimoire Heart by casting his ultimate Fairy Law spell, but the dark guild's master, Hades, threatens to counter with the similar Grimoire Law spell. To his horror, Makarov recognizes Hades as Precht Gaebolg, his predecessor as Fairy Tail's master.
104	104	"Lost Magic"; Transliteration: "Rosuto Majikku" (Japanese: 失われた魔法(ロスト・マジック))	Directed by : Hirokazu Yamada; Storyboarded by : Shinji Ishihira	Atsuhiro Tomioka	Jun Hanzawa	November 5, 2011	December 16, 2014
Makarov is defeated and gravely wounded in his battle against Hades, which is sensed by the wandering Laxus. Meanwhile, the other members of Fairy Tail battle Grimoire Heart's army. Joining the battle are the Seven Kin of Purgatory, each of whom practices an ancient form of magic called Lost Magic. Natsu faces Zancrow, one of the Seven Kin and a god slayer who can create black flames Natsu is unable to eat.
105	105	"Fire Dragon vs. Flame God"; Transliteration: "Karyū bāsasu Enjin" (Japanese: 火竜 vs. 炎神)	Directed by : Tsuyoshi Tobita; Storyboarded by : Shinji Ishihira	Fumihiko Shimo	Nobuharu Ishido	November 12, 2011	December 23, 2014
Natsu is overwhelmed by Zancrow's god slayer magic, which proves superior to his own dragon slayer magic. Upon finding Makarov badly injured during his fight, Natsu regains his resolve and defeats Zancrow by nullifying his own magical power, allowing him to eat Zancrow's flames and combine their power with his own. Meanwhile, Lucy Heartfilia, Cana Alberona, Gray Fullbuster, and Loke fight Caprico, another member of the Seven Kin, while sisters Mirajane and Lisanna Strauss fight Azuma.
106	106	"Grand Magic World"; Transliteration: "Dai Mahō Sekai" (Japanese: 大魔法世界)	Directed by : Kazunobu Fuseki; Storyboarded by : Yoshiyuki Asai	Shoji Yonemura	Hiroki Ikeshita	November 19, 2011	December 30, 2014
Azuma learns of Mirajane's former identity as the "Demon Woman" and straps Lisanna to a time bomb so he can fight Mirajane at full strength. Unwilling to lose Lisanna again, Mirajane sacrifices herself to defend Lisanna from the explosion. The remaining members of Fairy Tail learn from the Seven Kin their true goal: to "awaken" Zeref's full power and bring about the World of Great Magic, where only wizards would thrive while the remaining 90% of humanity would perish. Meanwhile, Seven Kin leader Ultear Milkovich finds Zeref and easily defeats him.
107	107	"Arc of Embodiment"; Transliteration: "Gugen no Āku" (Japanese: 具現のアーク)	Masaomi Andō	Atsuhiro Tomioka	Masanori Iizuka	November 26, 2011	January 6, 2015
Elfman Strauss and Evergreen are overwhelmed and defeated by Rustyrose's Arc of Incarnation, which gives him the power to create anything from his imagination. Meanwhile, Loke realizes Caprico is the celestial spirit Capricorn, and that he has the power to take control of humans. He sends Lucy, Gray, and Cana away while he fights Caprico, who recognizes Lucy as the daughter of celestial wizard Layla Heartfilia and declares that he must kill her.
108	108	"Human Gate"; Transliteration: "Ningen no Tobira" (Japanese: 人間の扉)	Directed by : Yusaku Saotome; Storyboarded by : Shinji Ishihira	Fumihiko Shimo	Yuji Ushijima, Takahisa Ichikawa & Naomi Yoshida	December 3, 2011	January 13, 2015
Caprico reveals himself to be a human named Zoldio who fused with Capricorn using his Human Subordination magic. He possesses Loke and plans to kill Lucy to regain a human form, but Loke gives his Regulus ring to the newly freed Capricorn, who uses it to free Loke and destroy Zoldio. Meanwhile, Cana suggests to Lucy and Gray that they split up to search for the Seven Kin and defeat them so they can resume the exam. After Lucy determines the location of Mavis Vermillion's grave, Cana knocks her out with a sleeping spell and abandons her to find the grave, leaving her to be found by Kain Hikaru of the Seven Kin.
109	109	"Lucy Fire"; Transliteration: "Rūshii Faia" (Japanese: ルーシィファイア)	Directed by : Yasuo Iwamoto; Storyboarded by : Shinji Ishihira	Shoji Yonemura	Yūya Takahashi	December 10, 2011	January 20, 2015
Lucy and Hikaru's battle starts out as her celestial spirits is unable to get the best of him. As Lucy is near defeated, Natsu's battle with Ultear is interrupt which he inadvertadly kicked Hikaru's head just in time. Natsu decides to help Lucy and reform their old team while Ultear leaves with Zeref. Hikaru takes control of Lucy's body using his voodoo-like cursing magic, using her to beat up Natsu. However, Natsu and Happy turns the table once they obtain Hikaru's voodoo doll but Hikaru hits Natsu into a pile of rocks, stuck in despair. As Hikaru is about to squeeze Lucy's head, Natsu gains the upper hand once more by controlling Lucy attacking Hikaru, giving a voodoo doll's hand fire and he tells Happy to go full speed, turning her into a living flying fireball, aiming directly at Hikaru with her kick, defeating him.
110	110	"Dead-End of Despair"; Transliteration: "Zetsubō no Fukurokōji" (Japanese: 絶望の袋小路)	Directed by : Qzo; Storyboarded by : Hiroyuki Fukushima	Masashi Sogo	Atsushi Soga	December 17, 2011	January 27, 2015
Doranbalt tries to help Natsu and his friends evacuate the island, warning that the Magic Council plans to fire their Etherion weapon on them, but they refuse to leave. Meanwhile, Juvia is nearly defeated during her and Erza's battle against Seven Kin member Merudy, but she regains her will to fight upon hearing Merudy say she wants to exact revenge on Gray for hurting Ultear, and dispatches Erza to search for Gray and their friends. Seeing Juvia's determination to fight for Gray leads Merudy to link both of their physical senses to Gray's to ensure that he dies no matter who is killed in their battle.
111	111	"Tears of Love and Vitality"; Transliteration: "Ai to Katsuryoku no Namida" (Japanese: 愛と活力の涙)	Directed by : Hirokazu Yamada; Storyboarded by : Hiroyuki Fukushima	Atsuhiro Tomioka	Jun Hanzawa & Masahiro Sekiguchi	December 24, 2011	February 3, 2015
Refusing to kill Merudy, Juvia instead tries stopping her from committing suicide. In doing so, Juvia witnesses Merudy's happy memories with Ultear through their connected senses, and persuades her to stop fighting. Meanwhile, Gray encounters Ultear, who says that he is her ally and that her plans for Zeref are part of her mother, Ur's, will. The other members of Fairy Tail encounter Grimoire Heart's remaining forces: Erza faces off against Azuma; a weakened Levy, Lisanna, and Panther Lily against Rustyrose; and Natsu, Lucy, and Wendy against Grimoire Heart's massively powerful deputy commander, Blue Note Stinger.
112	112	"The One Thing I Couldn't Say"; Transliteration: "Ienakatta Hitokoto" (Japanese: 言えなかった一言)	Directed by : Mamoru Enomoto; Storyboarded by : Shinji Ishihira	Shoji Yonemura	Tomohiro Koyama	January 7, 2012	February 10, 2015
Having found Mavis's grave, Cana reflects on her reasons for becoming an S-Class wizard. Her father is revealed to be Gildarts, who is unaware of his relationship with her, leading Cana to decide to become an S-Class wizard and bolster her own confidence to reveal the truth to him. Realizing that she has betrayed Lucy in her determination to become S-Class, a distraught Cana takes the Fairy Glitter spell from the grave and uses an enchanted card leading her to Lucy as she and her friends are attacked by Blue Note. She unsuccessfully attempts to perform the spell on Blue Note. However, Gildarts finally arrives and strikes Blue Note to rescue Cana.
113	113	"Tenrou Tree"; Transliteration: "Tenrōju" (Japanese: 天狼樹(てんろうじゅ))	Tsuyoshi Tobita	Fumihiko Shimo	Nobuharu Ishido & Kazuyuki Ikai	January 14, 2012	February 17, 2015
Gildarts fights Blue Note while Fried and Bickslow, having returned to Tenrou Island together with him, help Levy, Lisanna, and Panther Lily to fight Rustyrose. Meanwhile, Azuma reveals to Erza that he has used his magic, the Arboreal Arc, to absorb the magic-giving energy of the island's giant Sirius Tree, destroying it and draining the strength of all the Fairy Tail members on the island except Erza.
114	114	"Erza vs. Azuma"; Transliteration: "Eruza bāsasu Azuma" (Japanese: エルザ vs. アズマ)	Directed by : Masaomi Andō; Storyboarded by : Yoshiyuki Asai	Masashi Sogo	Hiroki Ikeshita	January 21, 2012	February 24, 2015
Erza makes Azuma promise to return her guild's magical power if she defeats him. She herself is nearly defeated when Azuma uses the Sirius Tree's magic, but receives her second wind upon hearing Natsu's voice and, drawing power from the tree's magic, cuts Azuma down.
115	115	"Freezing Fighting Spirit"; Transliteration: "Kogoeru Tōshi" (Japanese: 凍える闘志)	Directed by : Yūsuke Onoda; Storyboarded by : Hiroyuki Fukushima	Masashi Sogo	Shinya Ojiri	January 28, 2012	March 3, 2015
Azuma transforms into a tree as a result of overusing his Arboreal Arc, but makes good on his promise to Erza and returns the guild's magical power, giving Gildarts, Fried and Bickslow enough strength to defeat Blue Note and Rustyrose. Meanwhile, Ultear tells Gray that the only spell that can defeat Hades is Iced Shell. She then takes Zeref and returns to Merudy, revealing to her that she is actually trying to trick Gray into defeating Hades for her so she can keep Zeref for herself. However, Gray is not fooled by her deception and, catching onto her true motives, engages her in a duel.
116	116	"Power of Life"; Transliteration: "Seinaru Chikara" (Japanese: 生なる力)	Directed by : Noriaki Saito; Storyboarded by : Shinji Ishihira	Masashi Sogo	Seok Pyo Hong & Won Hee Cho	February 4, 2012	March 10, 2015
As their battle continues, Ultear tells Gray that Ur took her to a magic facility, where she was cruelly experimented on. Ultear eventually escaped to return to her mother, only to find that she has seemingly replaced her with Gray and Lyon. Gray eventually overpowers Ultear and the two fall into the ocean, where Ur's ice body had drifted out from Galuna Island. Ultear experiences her past from her mother's memory: Ur had actually left Ultear at the facility to save her life, but the facility's corrupt doctors tricked Ur by telling her that her daughter had died. Realizing that her mother truly loved her, Ultear admits defeat.
117	117	"Rolling Thunder"; Transliteration: "Raimei Hibiku" (Japanese: 雷鳴響く)	Directed by : Yusaku Saotome; Storyboarded by : Hiroyuki Fukushima	Masashi Sogo	Yuji Ushijima & Naomi Yoshida	February 11, 2012	March 17, 2015
Juvia chases Merudy as she carries Zeref before they run into Zancrow, who takes Zeref and cruelly reveals to Merudy that Ultear was responsible for destroying her home. Suddenly, Zeref awakens, utters the name "Acnologia", and unleashes a deadly wave of magic that kills Zancrow and knocks out Juvia and Merudy. Overhearing the commotion, Doranbalt warns the rest of the Magic Council troops, who retreat from the island. Meanwhile, Natsu, Lucy, Wendy, Happy, Carla, and Lily regroup with Gray and Erza. The exceeds infiltrate the Grimoire Heart airship to destroy its power source while the others take on Hades directly. Despite them fighting at full strength, Hades is unfazed by their attacks and prepares to kill Natsu, but is stopped by the timely arrival of Laxus.
118	118	"The Man Without an Emblem"; Transliteration: "Monshō o Kizamanu Otoko" (Japanese: 紋章を刻まぬ男)	Directed by : Hazuki Mizumoto; Storyboarded by : Shinji Ishihira	Masashi Sogo	Tomohiro Koyama	February 18, 2012	March 24, 2015
Laxus furiously battles Hades to avenge Makarov. Their fight rages until Hades gravely injures Laxus, so he transfers his own lightning magic to Natsu and tells him to defeat Hades. Meanwhile, the rest of the uninjured Fairy Tail members defend their wounded master and friends from Kain Hikaru, Kawazu, and Yomazu.
119	119	"Realm of the Abyss"; Transliteration: "Shin'en no Ryōiki" (Japanese: 深淵の領域)	Directed by : Yasuo Iwamoto; Storyboarded by : Hiroyuki Fukushima	Masashi Sogo	Kōsuke Yoshida & Ryo Haga	February 25, 2012	March 31, 2015
Despite using Laxus's lightning power to its fullest, Natsu's attacks continue to have no effect on Hades. Rather, Hades awakens the true depths of his magic power before the powerless Fairy Tail wizards, immobilizing them with fear. However, Natsu bolsters his friends with the same words of courage Gildarts had given them during the exam, and leads them in one final assault against Hades. Meanwhile, Happy, Carla, and Panther Lily stumble across a mechanical heart on the ship and try to destroy it.
120	120	"Daybreak on Tenrou Island"; Transliteration: "Akatsuki no Tenrō Jima" (Japanese: 暁の天狼島)	Directed by : Qzo; Storyboarded by : Shinji Ishihira	Masashi Sogo	Atsushi Soga	March 2, 2012	April 7, 2015
The mechanical heart Happy and Carla destroy turns out to be giving Hades his power. Ultear uses her magic to return the Sirius Tree to its original state, allowing Natsu, Lucy, Gray, Erza, Wendy, and Laxus to finally defeat the now powerless Hades. Makarov and the other injured guildmates return and order Grimoire Heart to leave Sirius Island. As the Fairy Tail wizards celebrate and recover from their fight, Hades and the other defeated Grimoire Heart members discover Zeref on their ship.
121	121	"The Right to Love"; Transliteration: "Aisuru Shikaku" (Japanese: 愛する資格)	Directed by : Hirokazu Yamada; Storyboarded by : Hiroyuki Fukushima	Masashi Sogo	Jun Hanzawa	March 9, 2012	April 14, 2015
Zeref reveals to Hades that his power had never been sealed to begin with, making Grimoire Heart's efforts to reawaken him pointless. Accusing Hades of summoning the dragon called Acnologia through his guild's actions, Zeref kills him. Ultear, meanwhile, confesses to Merudy about destroying her hometown and attempts suicide out of guilt, but Merudy rescues and forgives her. On Sirius Island, Makarov postpones the S-Class exam because of the battle, and Cana finally tells Gildarts that she is his daughter. As this happens, Acnologia forebodingly flies towards Sirius Island as Zeref watches in alarm.
122	122	"Let's Hold Hands"; Transliteration: "Te o Tsunagō" (Japanese: 手をつなごう)	Masaomi Andō	Masashi Sogo	Masanori Iizuka	March 16, 2012	April 21, 2015
Acnologia appears on Sirius Island and begins destroying everything in sight. Makarov tries to hold Acnologia off for his guild to escape, but they refuse to let their master die and help him fight the dragon. Everyone holds hands with one another to try and cast a defensive spell against Acnologia's breath attack, which seemingly obliterates the island. With the disappearance of the Fairy Tail members on the island, they are thought to be dead.
Key of the Starry Heavens Arc
123	123	"Fairy Tail, Year X791"; Transliteration: "Nanahyaku-kyūjūichi-nen: Fearī Teiru" (Japanese: X791年・妖精の尻尾(フェアリーテイル))	Directed by : Mamoru Enomoto; Storyboarded by : Shinji Ishihira	Masashi Sogo	Hiroki Ikeshita	March 23, 2012	April 28, 2015
Seven years have passed since the incident at Sirius Island and the Fairy Tail guild has become the weakest wizards' guild in Fiore, indebted to Twilight Ogre, a new local guild. The remaining Fairy Tail members are visited by Ichiya and the Tri-men of Blue Pegasus, who tell them that they have recently discovered a change in the magical energy around the waters where Sirius Island once stood. There they discover that the island was protected against Acnologia's attack by the spirit of Mavis Vermilion, who used her power to help everyone on the island cast the defensive Fairy Sphere spell that inadvertently caused them to be frozen in time for seven years. The missing members return to their guild, just in time to stop Twilight Ogre from hurting Romeo as Macao defends his son, forcing them to flee and the missing members celebrate their return from Sirius Island.
124	124	"The Seven Year Gap"; Transliteration: "Kūhaku no Nana-nen" (Japanese: 空白の7年)	Directed by : Kazunobu Fuseki; Storyboarded by : Shinji Ishihira	Masashi Sogo	Tomohiro Koyama	March 31, 2012	May 5, 2015
The members of Lamia Scale visit Fairy Tail as they celebrate their friends' return. Gray learns from Lyon what had happened to Ultear and Merudy over the past seven years, while Erza learns the same about Jellal. Makarov, Erza, and Mirajane later visit the Twilight Ogre guild and take revenge for being bullied by them. Meanwhile, Lucy is kicked out of her house for being unable to pay her rent for seven years. She decides to visit her father Jude, only to learn he had died one month before she and her friends returned from Sirius Island. She is allowed to return to her house by her landlady, who reveals to her seven years worth of birthday presents and rent money from her father, who had also left a letter detailing his unwavering hope that she was alive. Realizing her father truly loved her, Lucy admits her own love for her father.
125	125	"The Magic Ball"; Transliteration: "Mahō Butōkai" (Japanese: 魔法舞踏会)	Directed by : Tsuyoshi Tobita; Storyboarded by : Hiroyuki Fukushima	Shoji Yonemura	Nobuharu Ishido	April 7, 2012	May 12, 2015
Natsu, Lucy, and their friends take a job to capture Velveno, an escaped convict with the power to transform into other people and mimic their magic, who plans to attend a ball held by the wealthy Count Balsamico for his daughter Aceto to find a husband. It is assumed by the count that Velveno is there to steal the valuable Balsamico family ring. The Fairy Tail members fail to capture him before he obtains the ring, but he instead confesses his love for Aceto and uses it to propose to her. Aceto accepts his proposal on the condition that he turn himself in for his crimes, which he does at the cost of Fairy Tail's reward for the job.
126	126	"True Scoundrels – The Butt Jiggle Gang"; Transliteration: "Shin no Waruketsupuri-dan" (Japanese: 真の悪(ワル)ケツプリ団)	Directed by : Yasuyuki Fuse; Storyboarded by : Yoshiyuki Asai	Atsuhiro Tomioka	Tatsunori Sakamoto & Kōsuke Yoshida	April 14, 2012	May 19, 2015
Natsu Dragneel, Lucy Heartfilia, and Wendy keep watch over a gold-carrying train, which is hijacked by a trio of large-buttocked thieves called the Butt Jiggle Gang. The three use Natsu's motion sickness to their advantage to get rid of Lucy, Happy, and Carla, leaving Wendy the only one able to defend the train's cargo. She manages to impress them with her powers and tries to talk them out of their thieving ways, but once the train stops and Natsu recovers, Natsu sends them flying before she has a chance.
127	127	"The Terror of Invisible Lucy!"; Transliteration: "Tōmei Rūshii no Kyōfu!" (Japanese: 透明ルーシィの恐怖!)	Directed by : Noriaki Saito; Storyboarded by : Hiroyuki Fukushima	Fumihiko Shimo	Kōsuke Yoshida	April 21, 2012	June 2, 2015
Lucy bathes with a magical potion she created seven years ago, only to find that its effects have changed over the years to turn her entire body invisible. She turns to her friends for help, but their attempts to make her visible again fail. Eventually the potion's effects become so severe that they cause Lucy to disappear together with everyone's memories of her as if she had never existed. Fortunately, Natsu is able to remember his friendship with Lucy, allowing everyone to recall her back into existence. As Happy hugs Lucy in joy, however, she accidentally spills the potion bottle over everyone else, turning all of them invisible.
128	128	"Father's Memento"; Transliteration: "Chichi no Ihin" (Japanese: 父の遺品)	Directed by : Hitomi Ezoe; Storyboarded by : Shinji Ishihira	Atsuhiro Tomioka	Emi Honda & Nobuhiko Kawakami	April 28, 2012	June 9, 2015
Michelle, a girl claiming to be Lucy's relative, visits Fairy Tail and gives Lucy a briefcase containing a large relic, which she says is a memento from Lucy's late father. Because Michelle is an orphan and has nowhere else to go, Lucy takes Michelle in and suggests she start working at Fairy Tail. While adjusting to life at the guild, Michelle suggests that Lucy send a request to investigate the key. After Michelle accidentally drops the relic, it levitates into the air and a set of glowing symbols appears upon it. Makarov becomes suspicious and warns Lucy not to involve herself with the relic any further, though Lucy remains determined to find out what her father asked of her.
129	129	"Turbulent Showdown! Natsu vs. Laxus"; Transliteration: "Dotō no Taiketsu! Natsu bāsasu Rakusasu" (Japanese: 怒涛の対決! ナツ vs. ラクサス)	Directed by : Yūsuke Onoda; Storyboarded by : Hiroyuki Fukushima	Shoji Yonemura	Shigenori Taniguchi & Mikio Fujiwara	May 5, 2012	June 16, 2015
Natsu and Gajeel challenge the still-exiled Laxus to a fight. Wendy suggests they have a showdown the next day in the hopes that they will calm down and lose interest, but it only excites the rest of the guild, who hold a festival for it. Almost as soon as their battle starts, however, Laxus beats Natsu with a single punch and Gajeel runs away in fear. While the rest of the town searches for Gajeel, the guild is visited by three figures resembling Hughes, Sugar Boy, and Coco from Edolas. Meanwhile, Lucy decodes the writing on the relic with Levy's help and discovers that it is the hand of a legendary clock.
130	130	"Target: Lucy"; Transliteration: "Nerawa-reta Rūshii" (Japanese: 狙われたルーシィ)	Directed by : Yasuo Iwamoto; Storyboarded by : Shinji Ishihira	Fumihiko Shimo	Yūya Takahashi & Kōsuke Yoshida	May 12, 2012	June 23, 2015
The three visiting wizards, who turn out to be the Earth-land counterparts of Hughes (a woman named Mary Hughes), Sugar Boy, and Coco, battle Fairy Tail and demand to hand Lucy over to them. Michelle passes herself off as Lucy to protect her, prompting the rest of the guild to confuse the three into thinking that all of the females at Fairy Tail are Lucy so she and Michelle can escape. However, Hughes chases the two and forces them off the edge of a cliff.
131	131	"The Fury of Legion"; Transliteration: "Region no Mōi" (Japanese: レギオンの猛威)	Directed by : Naomichi Yamato; Storyboarded by : Yoshiyuki Asai	Masashi Sogo	Masanori Iizuka	May 19, 2012	June 30, 2015
Byro Cracy and his team are revealed to be members of the Legion Platoon, a group of crusaders who seek the clock hand in Lucy's possession for the Archbishop of Zentopia. Gray, Erza, and Gildarts help their guildmates friends battle the Legion Platoon, but Mary Hughes manages to obtain the clock hand from Lucy and lights a signal for her team to retreat.
132	132	"Key of the Starry Heavens"; Transliteration: "Hoshizora no Kagi" (Japanese: 星空の鍵)	Directed by : Kazunobu Fuseki; Storyboarded by : Shinji Ishihira	Atsuhiro Tomioka	Tomohiro Koyama	May 26, 2012	July 7, 2015
Fairy Tail goes to the Heartfilia mansion in search of clues for what Legion wants with the clock hand. They learn that Legion is searching for pieces of the mystical clock following clues from two myths—one myth is the book from which Lucy learned about the clock hand, and the other is an enchanted picture book titled Key of the Starry Heavens. Before they can leave with the book, they are attacked by Legion's Exceed leader Samuel and his spearman Dan Straight, who shrink Natsu to minuscule size, obtain the book, and memorize its contents before leaving. Meanwhile, Lahar and his men encounter Jackpot, a serial arsonist who is burning down churches.
133	133	"Travel Companions"; Transliteration: "Tabi no Nakama-tachi" (Japanese: 旅の仲間たち)	Directed by : Yoshihisa Matsumoto; Storyboarded by : Hiroyuki Fukushima	Masashi Sogo	Kenichiro Suzuki	June 2, 2012	July 14, 2015
Following clues from the picture book, the members of Fairy Tail split into groups to search for the remaining pieces of the mystical clock before Legion does. Lucy's team is approached by a group of archaeologists interested in the clock, who have heard rumors of Fairy Tail's journey and try to dissuade her. Upon learning her identity and her resolution in following her father's dying wish, the head archaeologist, who is familiar with Lucy's father, has a change of heart and uses his team's magic to return Natsu to his original size. Meanwhile, Lyon also learns of Fairy Tail's exploits and joins Gray and Juvia.
134	134	"Labyrinth Capriccio"; Transliteration: "Meikyū Kyōsōkyoku" (Japanese: 迷宮狂想曲)	Directed by : Yusaku Saotome; Storyboarded by : Shinji Ishihira	Shoji Yonemura	Sadahiko Sakamaki, Kenji Hattori & Yuji Ushijima	June 9, 2012	July 21, 2015
Natsu and Lucy's team finds an underground labyrinth in the middle of the desert. They make their way past several booby traps as they descend until they reach a crypt at the bottom, where they encounter Coco and Dan. Meanwhile, Gray's team uncovers a parallel dimension where one of the clock parts is hidden. Sugar Boy appears before them to take the part, but Gray's team defeats him.
135	135	"Footprints of the Myth"; Transliteration: "Shinwa no Ashiato" (Japanese: 神話の足跡)	Directed by : Mamoru Enomoto; Storyboarded by : Hiroyuki Fukushima	Fumihiko Shimo	Hiroki Ikeshita	June 16, 2012	July 28, 2015
Natsu and Lucy's team battles Dan and Coco as they search for the clock part in the underground crypt. During their fight, Lucy and Coco are separated from the others, but help each other until they reunite with their comrades. Meanwhile, Gajeel helps Levy and her team search for one of the clock parts in the mountains, while Erza's team enters an old library where they encounter the Butt Jiggle Gang.
136	136	"True Scoundrels, Once Again"; Transliteration: "Shin no Waru, Futatabi" (Japanese: 真の悪(ワル)、ふたたび)	Noriaki Saito	Atsuhiro Tomioka	Emi Kōno & Ryo Haga	June 23, 2012	August 4, 2015
Natsu has difficulty battling Dan alone due to the power and skill Dan accumulated over seven years. With the help of his friends, however, he defeats Dan and uncovers the clock part in an underground church. Meanwhile, Erza tries disciplining the Butt Jiggle Gang while her teammates find the clock part in the library, and defeats the gang after their flatulence ruins a flower she picked earlier. Concurrently, Samuel confronts Gajeel and his team as they search for the next clock part.
137	137	"Defying Calculation"; Transliteration: "Keisan o Koeru Mono" (Japanese: 計算をこえるもの)	Directed by : Tsuyoshi Tobita; Storyboarded by : Hiroyuki Fukushima	Fumihiko Shimo	Nobuharu Ishido	June 30, 2012	August 11, 2015
Panther Lily battles and defeats Samuel as Gajeel's team retrieves the clock part from an underground chamber. Meanwhile, the Strauss siblings find another clock part and encounter Mary Hughes, while Byro appears before Natsu's team with the clock hand in his possession.
138	138	"The Course of the Holy War"; Transliteration: "Seisen no Yukue" (Japanese: 聖戦のゆくえ)	Directed by : Masaomi Andō; Storyboarded by : Shinji Ishihira	Shoji Yonemura	Masanori Iizuka	July 7, 2012	August 18, 2015
Mary Hughes uses her powers to extract Mirajane's Satan Soul transformation from her body and uses it against her siblings. However, Mirajane uses her forbidden "Halphas" transformation against Satan Soul and defeats Mary Hughes. Meanwhile, Byro reveals to Natsu's team that Legion is under orders from the archbishop of Zentopia to gather and safeguard the clock parts from a magical guild that seeks to assemble it and form the Infinity Clock. However, Natsu's team find their motives suspicious and continue to battle him.
139	139	"Time Begins to Tick"; Transliteration: "Ugoki Hajimeta Toki" (Japanese: 動き始めた刻(とき))	Directed by : Yasuyuki Fuse; Storyboarded by : Shinji Ishihira	Masashi Sogo	Hyun Woo Ju & Won Hee Cho	July 14, 2012	August 25, 2015
Byro overpowers Natsu with his ability to nullify all forms of magic, though Natsu and his friends' determination moves Coco into betraying Legion. Before Byro can defeat Natsu, the rest of the guild members arrive with the remaining clock parts, guided to the crypt when the parts react to each other. However, gathering all six parts in one place causes the Infinity Clock to assemble itself, with a reformed Oración Seis appearing alongside it.
140	140	"Enter the Neo-Oración Seis!"; Transliteration: "Shinsei Orashion Seisu Genru!" (Japanese: 新生六魔将軍(オラシオンセイス)現る!)	Directed by : Yūsuke Onoda; Storyboarded by : Shinji Ishihira	Atsuhiro Tomioka	Mikio Fujiwara & Masatsugu Yamamoto	July 21, 2012	September 1, 2015
Led by Midnight, now calling himself Brain II, the members of the reborn Oración Seis use their new powers to defeat both Fairy Tail and Legion. Fairy Tail is rescued by Blue Pegasus while the Oración Seis disappear with the Infinity Clock. Lucy rereads Key of the Starry Heavens and realizes that her father entrusted her with the clock hand to prevent the clock from being constructed. Realizing that they were not supposed to collect the clock parts, Fairy Tail sets out to stop both the Oración Seis and the Infinity Clock.
141	141	"Get the Infinity Clock!"; Transliteration: "Mugen Tokei o Oe!" (Japanese: 無限時計を追え!)	Directed by : Yoshihisa Matsumoto; Storyboarded by : Hiroyuki Fukushima	Fumihiko Shimo	Konomi Sakurai	July 28, 2012	September 8, 2015
Fairy Tail learns that the Oración Seis are destroying churches as part of their plan to complete the Infinity Clock's power. Using Cana's divination, the members of Fairy Tail split into new groups and head out to undestroyed churches where they find members of Legion and the Oración Seis waiting for them. Meanwhile, Gildarts and Laki investigate the long-abandoned plantation of Michelle's family, Legion adds the convict Guttman to their ranks, and Lahar interrogates the Zentopia cardinal Lapointe about Oración Seis's recent escape from prison.
142	142	"Dissonance of Battle"; Transliteration: "Tatakai no Fukyōwaon" (Japanese: 戦いの不協和音)	Directed by : Hitomi Ezoe; Storyboarded by : Hiroyuki Fukushima	Masashi Sogo	Tomohiro Koyama	August 4, 2012	September 15, 2015
Lahar enlists the help of Doranbalt, who has retired out of depression over his inability to help Fairy Tail on Sirius Island. Meanwhile, Natsu and Wendy's teams face off against Oración Seis' Jackpot and Grim Reaper (formerly Erigor of Eisenwald), respectively, and Gajeel and Juvia find Guttman and Mary Hughes attacking a church, while Gildarts and Laki investigate a church filled with artificial priests and nuns.
143	143	"Anti-Link"; Transliteration: "Anchi Rinku" (Japanese: アンチリンク)	Directed by : Yasuo Iwamoto; Storyboarded by : Shinji Ishihira	Shoji Yonemura	Hiroko Kūrube	August 11, 2012	September 22, 2015
Lahar and Doranbalt meet Katja, one of many celestial wizards tasked with guarding an unknown force that the Oración Seis are hunting. Racer appears before them and, after fighting Doranbalt, uses a spell called "Anti-Link" to permanently sever Katja's power, weakening the seal to their target. Meanwhile, Wendy defeats the brainwashed Erigor and restores his memories, Gray and Erza's teams battle Angel and Cobra, respectively and Gildarts and Laki discover the comatose body of a girl named Michelle, bringing the identity of the "Michelle" with Natsu's group into question.
144	144	"Despair Unleashed"; Transliteration: "Tokihanata-reta Zetsubō" (Japanese: 解き放たれた絶望)	Directed by : Kazunobu Fuseki; Storyboarded by : Shinji Ishihira	Fumihiko Shimo	Masato Numazu	August 18, 2012	September 29, 2015
The members of the Oración Seis stop fighting Fairy Tail and resume their mission of casting Anti-Links on the celestial wizards hidden in churches, completely lifting the seal on the Infinity Clock's true form, a massive, clockwork dreadnought. Byro, meanwhile, tells Natsu's team of his orders from Lapointe to bring Lucy to Zentopia's archbishop. With Oración Seis's plan complete, "Michelle" reveals her true identity as a member of Oración Seis, Imitatia, who posed as Lucy's relative to manipulate Fairy Tail into helping them. She also reveals her authority as archbishop given to her by the real one, forcing Byro to follow her orders, and kidnaps Lucy.
145	145	"Real Nightmare"; Transliteration: "Riaru Naitomea" (Japanese: リアルナイトメア)	Directed by : Mamoru Enomoto; Storyboarded by : Hiroyuki Fukushima	Atsuhiro Tomioka	Hiroki Ikeshita	August 25, 2012	October 6, 2015
Natsu is imprisoned in Zentopia Cathedral along with the Butt Jiggle Gang, but later manages to break free and brings Coco along as well. Meanwhile, Lucy is pinned onto a device while the Oracion Seis prepare to activate Real Nightmare, the magic that the Infinity Clock contains. The group of archaeologists that Lucy previously encountered, whose leader revealed to be the descendant of Will Neville and an acquaintance of Jude Heartfilia, show up at the guild and ask Fairy Tail to stop the clock. Later, Ichiya comes with the redesigned Christina to bring Erza, Gray, Elfman, Mirajane, Wendy, and Warren to Zentopia Cathedral. Racer appears in the airship and Mirajane decides to battle him.
146	146	"Time Spiral"; Transliteration: "Toki no Supairaru" (Japanese: 時のスパイラル)	Noriaki Saito	Shoji Yonemura	Ryo Haga & Jiemon Futsuzawa	September 1, 2012	October 13, 2015
The Infinity Clock turns out to be affecting the time state of humans. Mirajane defeats Racer and Ichiya fights Kanaloa, which Byro sends out just as the airship arrives at the Zentopia Cathedral. Natsu and Coco encounter Guttman, but Mary Hughes comes to aid them and decides to take him on by herself. Gildarts and Laki get to the archbishop's room first and find out that the archbishop is being controlled by Cardinal Lapointe. Byro overhears this and rushes to face off with Lapointe.
147	147	"To the Infinity Castle!"; Transliteration: "Mugenjō e!" (Japanese: 無限城へ!)	Directed by : Tsuyoshi Tobita; Storyboarded by : Hiroyuki Fukushima	Shoji Yonemura	Nobuharu Ishido	September 8, 2012	October 20, 2015
The reason why Lucy is kidnapped is that since the Infinity Clock needs celestial wizards to seal it, the one that can control it should be a celestial wizard as well. Led by Coco, Natsu, Gray, Erza, Gajeel, and Elfman set off to the Infinity Castle to defeat the Oracion Seis in order to change the ownership of the clock, so they can stop it and save Lucy. However, Cobra, Angel, and Midnight interfere, causing Erza, Gray, and Gajeel take on each of them respectively. Lapointe is actually a doll created by Personification Magic using Master Zero's hair. Gildarts somehow manage to defeat Byro.
148	148	"Angel Tears"; Transliteration: "Tenshi no Namida" (Japanese: 天使の涙)	Directed by : Yūsuke Onoda; Storyboarded by : Shinji Ishihira	Atsuhiro Tomioka	Mikio Fujiwara & Masatsugu Yamamoto	September 15, 2012	October 27, 2015
As Lucy is slowly being sucked within the Infinity Clock, Imitatia faces off against Natsu, Elfman and Coco. In addition, every other member of Fairy Tail starts working to stop the Infinity Clock from bringing forth chaos and to find the runaway Kinana. Erza and Cobra continue their match. Gray and Dan Straight face off against Angel, whose self-titled Magic proves to be more dangerous for her than it is for her opponents.
149	149	"I Hear the Voice of My Friend"; Transliteration: "Tomo no Koe ga Kikoeru" (Japanese: 友の声が聴こえる)	Directed by : Yasuyuki Fuse; Storyboarded by : Shinji Ishihira	Fumihiko Shimo	Hiroko Kūrube	September 22, 2012	November 3, 2015
While Erza concludes her battle with Cobra, Lucy is slowly becoming part of the Infinity Clock. The process has already begun and hope is lost, until the Archbishop, who regains consciousness, comes up with a way to slow down the process: destroying the chains linking to Earth Land. Legion and Fairy Tail cooperate in order to stop Brain II and destroy the Clock's chains. Meanwhile, Brain II tells Imitatia that should Lucy be fully merged with the clock, all memory of Lucy will vanish. Horrified, Imitatia rushes to save Lucy, only to be reverted by Brain II into her true form: a doll Lucy owned as a child.
150	150	"Lucy and Michelle"; Transliteration: "Rūshii to Missheru" (Japanese: ルーシィとミッシェル)	Directed by : Junichi Wada; Storyboarded by : Shinji Ishihira	Masashi Sogo	Masanori Iizuka	September 29, 2012	November 10, 2015
Natsu finally manages to defeat Midnight when the wizard overestimates his ability to control the entirety of the Infinity Clock by himself. As the dark guild's possession of the Clock is revoked, Lucy floats inside the golden liquid of the clock, remembering her childhood and connection to Michelle. As she hears her friends calling her, Lucy tries to escape the clock, and is able to do so with the help of Jean-Luc and the others at the Fairy Tail guild. Sending out blue shooting stars to find and return those affected by Anti-Link to their normal selves, Lucy is separated from the clock and falls from the sky, being caught by Natsu and reuniting with her guild.
Grand Magic Games Arc
151	151	"Sabertooth"; Transliteration: "Seibātūsu" (Japanese: 剣咬の虎(セイバートゥース))	Directed by : Kazunobu Fuseki; Storyboarded by : Shinji Ishihira & Hiroyuki Fukushima	Masashi Sogo	Tomohiro Koyama	October 6, 2012	November 17, 2015
The Legion Platoon is tasked by Zentopia's archbishop to retrieve the missing pieces of the Infinity Clock and seal them again. Before embarking on their mission, they visit Fairy Tail and make amends with the guild for their previous hostility against them. It is later discovered that Fairy Tail has lost their title as the strongest guild in Fiore to the Saber Tooth guild over the past seven years. Two of the strongest wizards in the guild include a pair of Dragon Slayers named Sting and Rogue, who are obsessed with fighting Natsu Dragneel and Gajeel, respectively. Meanwhile, Makarov brings Gildarts to their abandoned guildhall and shows him Lumen Histoire, a light that Makarov says is Fairy Tail's greatest secret. Makarov then tells Gildarts that he has been chosen to become the next master of Fairy Tail.
152	152	"And So We Aim for the Top"; Transliteration: "Soshite Ore-tachi wa Chōjō o Mezasu" (Japanese: そしてオレたちは頂上を目指す)	Directed by : Shigetaka Ikeda; Storyboarded by : Hiroyuki Fukushima	Masashi Sogo	Yuji Ushijima & Katsunori Kikuchi	October 13, 2012	November 24, 2015
Natsu and his friends discover that a power gap has developed between them and the rest of the guild members who were not on Sirius Island. The group meets with Porlyusica for medicine to strengthen their magic, but are unsuccessful. Wendy recognizes Porlyusica's voice and scent as those of Grandeeney, the dragon who raised her. Porlyusica reveals herself as the Edolas counterpart of Grandeeney, and gives Wendy written instructions for two advanced spells that Grandeeney failed to teach her. Meanwhile, Makarov announces Gildarts' succession as master to the rest of the guild, only to find he has gone on a journey, leaving a letter of resignation behind. In the letter, Gildarts reinstates Laxus into the guild, returns mastership to Makarov, and tells him to make Fairy Tail the strongest guild in Fiore again. Romeo suggests they participate in the Grand Magic Games, an annual festival designed to determine the guild rankings in Fiore.
153	153	"Song of the Stars"; Transliteration: "Hoshiboshi no Uta" (Japanese: 星々の歌)	Directed by : Yoshihiro Takamoto; Storyboarded by : Hiroyuki Fukushima	Masashi Sogo	Noriko Ogura	October 20, 2012	December 1, 2015
With the Grand Magic Games occurring in three months time, Natsu and his friends train at a beach resort. On their second day of training, Virgo appears and tells the wizards that the Celestial Spirit World is in danger of destruction. When the wizards arrive, they instead find a surprise party held by the Celestial Spirit King celebrating their return from Sirius Island after seven years. They spend the day in the spirit world partying with the spirits. Before they leave, however, Virgo informs them that one day in the spirit world equals three months in the human world, and they find the Grand Magic Games are upon them.
154	154	"For All the Time We Missed Each Other"; Transliteration: "Surechigatta Jikan no Bun Dake" (Japanese: すれ違った時間の分だけ)	Noriaki Saito	Shoji Yonemura	Masaaki Yamamoto & Jiemon Futsuzawa	October 27, 2012	December 8, 2015
While mulling over their lost training time, the Fairy Tail wizards receive a message via carrier pigeon requesting a private meeting in the forest nearby. There they meet a runaway Jellal, Ultear, and Merudy, who have formed their own guild, Crime Sorcière, to defeat Zeref and any dark guilds that try to use his power. The three ask Fairy Tail for their help in determining the source of a magical anomaly similar to Zeref's magic that they have sensed around the Grand Magic Games arena, Domus Flau. In exchange, Ultear uses her magic to invoke their Second Origin in order to double their magic power. As the others undergo the painful process of awakening their Second Origin, Erza talks with Jellal over his regained memories. The two nearly kiss, but Jellal tells Erza that he has a fiancée (deciding he cannot fall in love with those who walk the path of light). Erza quickly picks up on this and respects his decision but they both still have feelings for each other, seeing Crime Sorcière off as they leave.
155	155	"Crocus, the Flower-Blooming Capital"; Transliteration: "Hanasaku Miyako: Kurokkasu" (Japanese: 花咲く都・クロッカス)	Mamoru Enomoto	Shoji Yonemura	Hiroki Ikeshita	November 3, 2012	December 15, 2015
Natsu, Lucy Heartfilia, Gray, Erza, and Wendy are chosen to represent their guild in the Grand Magic Games, which are to be held in Fiore's capital, Crocus. As they tour the city, Natsu and Happy encounter the twin dragon slayers, Sting and Rogue, who mock Natsu for not being able to kill Acnologia, and boast of becoming true dragon slayers by killing the dragons who raised them. At midnight, Fairy Tail and the other participating guilds are put through a preliminary event—a race through a massive floating labyrinth—designed to narrow the number of participating guilds down to eight teams.
156	156	"Sky Labyrinth"; Transliteration: "Sukai Rabirinsu" (Japanese: 空中迷宮(スカイラビリンス))	Directed by : Tsuyoshi Tobita; Storyboarded by : Shinji Ishihira	Atsuhiro Tomioka	Nobuharu Ishido	November 10, 2012	December 22, 2015
Natsu's team notices that Wendy has gone missing, so Elfman replaces her to keep them from being eliminated. As they make their way through the enchanted labyrinth, the five encounter various other guilds and steal the maps made by the other guilds to better navigate the maze. They manage to reach the end of the maze and pass the elimination round, confident they have arrived first, only to discover they have barely taken last place. Meanwhile, Happy, Lisanna, and the rest of the guild search for Wendy and Carla. They eventually find the two in the garden of the king's palace, Mercurius, with their magic power depleted.
157	157	"New Guild"; Transliteration: "Shinki Girudo" (Japanese: 新規ギルド)	Directed by : Yūsuke Onoda; Storyboarded by : Susumu Nishizawa	Atsuhiro Tomioka	Masatsugu Yamamoto & Mikio Fujiwara	November 17, 2012	December 29, 2015
Wendy's body is weakened as a result of losing her magic power. As Porlyusica helps her recover, she formally requests Elfman to take her place in the Grand Magic Games. Fairy Tail steps into the arena with a negative audience reception, but they are bolstered by their guild mates and the spirit of Mavis, whom only the Fairy Tail guild members can see. The next four participating teams are revealed to be Quatro Cerberus, Mermaid Heel, Blue Pegasus, and Lamia Scale. Following them is Raven Tail, a former dark guild led by Makarov's son Ivan, who confess to attacking Wendy and Carla. To everyone's shock, the next team is revealed to be a second team from Fairy Tail composed of Gajeel, Juvia, Mirajane, Laxus, and Jellal (disguised as Mystogan to help investigate the arena). The final guild to be announced is Saber Tooth, much to the joy of the audience. With all eight teams announced, they each send out one member to participate in the first contest of the games, with Gray and Juvia representing their teams.
158	158	"Night of Shooting Stars"; Transliteration: "Hoshifuru Yoru ni" (Japanese: 星降(ホシフ)ル夜ニ)	Directed by : Kazunobu Shimizu; Storyboarded by : Hiroyuki Fukushima	Fumihiko Shimo	Masakazu Yamagishi	November 24, 2012	January 5, 2016
The games' first contest, "Hidden", requires the eight participants to score points by finding and attacking each other in a virtual city filled with copies of themselves. Raven Tail member Nalpudding repeatedly targets Gray, who scores last place in the contest while Saber Tooth's Rufus scores first by using his Memory-Make magic to attack all the other participants at once. Humiliated, Gray swears revenge against Raven Tail and Saber Tooth. Afterwards, Lucy is chosen to fight Raven Tail member Flare in the tournament's first battle round.
159	159	"Lucy vs. Flare"; Transliteration: "Rūshii bāsasu Furea" (Japanese: ルーシィ vs. フレア)	Directed by : Kazunobu Fuseki; Storyboarded by : Shinji Ishihira	Fumihiko Shimo	Tomohiro Koyama	December 1, 2012	January 12, 2016
Lucy displays tremendous skill in her battle against Flare by being able to summon two spirits simultaneously. As Lucy gains the upper hand, Flare cheats by using her magic hair to hold Alzack and Bisca's daughter Asuka as a hostage, blackmailing Lucy into not fighting back to keep her from harming Asuka. Natsu is able to sense the danger and rushes to Asuka to incinerate Flare's hair, allowing Lucy to counterattack with her Urano Metria spell in combination with Gemini. However, before the spell fully activates, Flare's teammate Obra nullifies Lucy's magic, causing her to collapse and lose the match.
160	160	"Portent"; Transliteration: "Kyōzui" (Japanese: 凶瑞)	Yasuo Iwamoto	Atsuhiro Tomioka	Hiroko Kūrube	December 8, 2012	January 19, 2016
Blue Pegasus' Ren defeats Mermaid Heel's Araña during the games' second match, while Saber Tooth's Orga effortlessly defeats Quatro Cerberus' War Cry in the third match. For the day's fourth and final match, Jellal is pitted against Lamia Scale's Jura, intending to avenge the humiliated Fairy Tail members. He mimics Mystogan's magic to keep up his disguise, but he finds it ineffective to use against Jura and is forced to use his own magic instead. Before he can cast a spell that will expose his true identity, Ultear uses Merudy's sensory to force Jellal into submission. Meanwhile, the hospitalized Carla awakens after having a troubling premonition of the future.
161	161	"Chariots"; Transliteration: "Chariotto" (Japanese: 戦車(チャリオット))	Directed by : Shigetaka Ikeda; Storyboarded by : Hiroyuki Fukushima	Shoji Yonemura	Yuji Ushijima, Katsunori Kikuchi & Kenji Hattori	December 15, 2012	January 26, 2016
Fairy Tail is undaunted by their poor performance on the first day. As the guild celebrates, they are visited and taunted by Bacchus, Erza's rival from Quatro Cerberus, who has come to replace War Cry. Carla relays her premonition to Porlyusica, saying that she saw Mercurius collapsing around what appeared to be a tearfully singing Lucy. The second day of the tournament begins with a footrace atop a train of moving chariots, causing the participants Natsu, Gajeel, and Sting to suffer from motion sickness as a side effect of their Dragon Slayer magic. As Natsu and Gajeel force themselves forward, Sting inquires about their determination to which Natsu responds that it is as a result of the strength of Fairy Tail's bonds. Sting eventually throws the race while Natsu and Gajeel manage to finish as sixth and seventh placers, respectively, earning Fairy Tail the audience's respect.
162	162	"Elfman vs. Bacchus"; Transliteration: "Erufuman bāsasu Bakkasu" (Japanese: エルフマン vs. バッカス)	Directed by : Yoshihisa Matsumoto; Storyboarded by : Shinji Ishihira	Masashi Sogo	Masanori Iizuka	December 22, 2012	—
Due to a miscommunication between the king and his knight Arcadios, Elfman is chosen as Bacchus' opponent instead of Erza. Before the match commences, the two opponents make a wager: if Bacchus wins, he will court Elfman's sisters, and if Elfman wins, Bacchus' team name will be changed to "Quatro Puppy" for the rest of the games. Bacchus ruthlessly attacks Elfman with his bare palms, who manages to damage Bacchus with his defensive Lizardman transformation. Elfman manages to outlast Bacchus as he exhausts himself, winning the match and forcing Bacchus' team to be renamed. Meanwhile, Natsu finds Wendy, Carla, and Porlyusica being kidnapped by a group of masked men. Upon being caught, the men claim they were hired to kidnap Lucy by Raven Tail. They are soon revealed to have actually been sent by Arcadios, who intends to sow discord between the guilds as he plots to use Lucy for his "Eclipse Project".
163	163	"Mirajane vs. Jenny"; Transliteration: "Mirajēn bāsasu Jenī" (Japanese: ミラジェーン vs. ジェニー)	Noriaki Saito	Fumihiko Shimo	Jiemon Futsuzawa & Masaaki Yamamoto	January 5, 2013	—
The second day of the Grand Magic Games continues, with Mirajane of Fairy Tail Team B fighting against Jenny Realite of Team Blue Pegasus. Since the two competitors are well-known for being magazine models, their battle consists almost entirely of a fashion showdown, much to the pleasure of the audience. Eventually, as the showdown becomes redundant, Jenny proposes a wager: the loser must pose nude for the Weekly Sorcerer magazine, which Mirajane accepts. Jenny then transforms into her battle armor while Mirajane shifts into her Satan Soul "Sitri" form and easily defeats Jenny. The final match of the day is announced, with Kagura Mikazuchi of Mermaid Heel pitted against Yukino Aguria of Saber Tooth. Yukino proposes to Kagura that they wager their lives on their battle. Meanwhile, Arcadios is confronted by Darton, the kingdom's defense minister, about his "Eclipse Project".
164	164	"Kagura vs. Yukino"; Transliteration: "Kagura bāsasu Yukino" (Japanese: カグラ vs. ユキノ)	Directed by : Kazunobu Fuseki; Storyboarded by : Shinji Ishihira	Shoji Yonemura	Masato Numazu	January 12, 2013	—
Yukino is revealed to be a celestial spirit wizard when she summons Libra and Pisces to attack Kagura. Using her gravity-altering magic, Kagura defeats the two spirits, thus forcing Yukino to use a Gatekey that summons Ophiuchus, which is regarded as the strongest among the Celestial Spirits. However, Kagura slays Ophiuchus with her sword still sheathed and easily defeats Yukino. Later, Jellal discusses the fact that he has not sensed the evil power similar to Zeref's even though the second day of the Grand Magic Games has ended. Erza reunites with Milliana, who is revealed to be a member of Mermaid Heel. Meanwhile, Saber Tooth's master Ziemma is dissatisfied with his guild's performance. Though Sting is given another chance, Ziemma humiliates Yukino for her failure.
165	165	"Hatred at Nightfall"; Transliteration: "Urami wa Yoru no Tobari ni Tsutsumarete" (Japanese: 怨みは夜の帳に包まれて)	Directed by : Tsuyoshi Tobita; Storyboarded by : Hiroyuki Fukushima	Masashi Sogo	Nobuharu Ishido	January 19, 2013	—
After Yukino is expelled from Saber Tooth, she offers her two golden Gatekeys to Lucy to complete the latter's collection of the Zodiac Gatekeys, stating that when the twelve Zodiac Gatekeys are all gathered, a gateway that changes the world will open; however, Lucy turns down the offer. Meanwhile, Milliana tells Erza that Kagura's sword, Archenemy, is intended to kill Jellal, and that she and Kagura share the same resentment towards Jellal. Natsu and Happy run after Yukino in an attempt to apologize; however, Natsu realizes that Yukino had been expelled, and infiltrates the Crocus Garden to fight Ziemma.
166	166	"Pandemonium"; Transliteration: "Pandemoniumu" (Japanese: 伏魔殿(パンデモニウム))	Hiroyuki Fukushima	Fumihiko Shimo	Hiroki Ikeshita	January 26, 2013	—
After Natsu punches out Dorvengal, the guild member summoned to fight him, he and Ziemma engage in a duel. However, the guild master's daughter Minerva appears, ends their duel and, taking Happy hostage, convinces Natsu to settle their dispute in the Grand Magic Games. As Natsu leaves, he states that Saber Tooth will never surpass Fairy Tail because they care for their friends, words that are echoed by Rogue, while Sting is left in awe at Natsu's strength. The following day as the Grand Magic Games continue, an event called "Pandemonium" begins. It involves the participants entering a magical citadel filled with 100 monsters of varying strengths and individually doing battle with any number of monsters they choose. Representing Fairy Tail Team A, Erza requests the 100 monsters as her opponents.
167	167	"100 Against 1"; Transliteration: "Hyaku tai Ichi" (Japanese: 100対1)	Directed by : Kazunobu Shimizu; Storyboarded by : Shinji Ishihira	Atsuhiro Tomioka	Masakazu Yamagishi	February 2, 2013	—
Erza kills the 100 monsters using various types of armor to match their strength and weaknesses. As a result, the crowd praises Fairy Tail, and the guild is awarded with 10 points. Moreover, the game officials decided to determine the ranks of the remaining participants by means of a device called "Magic Power Finder" (sometimes abbreviated as MPF). Using this tool, participants must attack it with their magic power, which will, in turn, calculate and display their equivalent scores depending on the extent of power used. In the end, Cana of Fairy Tail Team B dominates the event by using the Fairy Glitter spell lent to her by Mavis, much to Makarov's surprise. With Cana's victory, Fairy Tail Team B receives 8 points, and the audience began to burst once more into a resounding swarm of cheers and claps due to the finish of the two Fairy Tail teams. Meanwhile, the Raven Tail team somehow managed to get an insider information regarding the battle matchups for the day, so the masked leader Alexei tells his subordinates Flare, Obra, Nalpudding, and Kurohebi that it's about time to proceed with their true mission.
168	168	"Laxus vs. Alexei"; Transliteration: "Rakusasu bāsasu Arekusei" (Japanese: ラクサス vs. アレクセイ)	Directed by : Yoshihisa Matsumoto; Storyboarded by : Hiroyuki Fukushima	Shoji Yonemura	Tomohiro Koyama	February 9, 2013	—
In the battle portion of the Grand Magic Games' third day, Milliana of Mermaid Heel beats Semmes of Quatro Puppy while Saber Tooth's Rufus swiftly defeats Blue Pegasus' Eve. For the third match, Laxus of Fairy Tail Team B is chosen to battle against Alexei of Team Raven Tail. Since the opponent is from a suspicious guild, the Fairy Tail members take extra precautions by watching the actions of Ivan Dreyar as well as the other four Raven Tail members. However, as the match commences, the spectators are shocked to see Laxus being beaten by Alexei, although no cautious movements can be seen from the Raven Tail team. It turns out that the two dueling people are just illusions created by Alexei in order for him to have a talk with Laxus. Also, the other Raven Tail members being monitored by Fairy Tail are just lifelike illusions, for in reality they are with Alexei in the battlefield. Alexei reveals himself to be Ivan Dreyar. Unable to interrogate Laxus of the Lumen Histoire's location, Ivan and the Raven Tail members are forced to fight him. Before their battle begins, Ivan declares that Raven Tail is an anti-Fairy Tail guild.
169	169	"Wendy vs. Shelia"; Transliteration: "Wendi bāsasu Sheria" (Japanese: ウェンディ vs. シェリア)	Directed by : Yasuo Iwamoto; Storyboarded by : Shinji Ishihira	Atsuhiro Tomioka	Hiroko Kūrube	February 16, 2013	—
After Laxus defeats Ivan and the four Raven Tail elite members, Ivan's illusions disappear to the shock of everyone in the stadium. The game officials declare Laxus the victor, and Ivan tells him that Lumen Histoire is Fairy Tail’s 'darkness'. Due to the infraction of the rules, the Raven Tail team is disqualified for the remainder of the Games, and its members are captured by the soldiers. Later, Wendy of Fairy Tail Team A and Sherria Blendy of Team Lamia Scale face off to compete for the final match of the day. As the two exchange attacks, gusts of wind surround the arena since Sherria is revealed to be a Sky God Slayer. Wendy employs an advanced Sky Dragon Slayer attack much to Porlyusica's astonishment, causing Sherria to fall on the ground. Wendy is about to be announced as the winner of the bout when Sherria suddenly stands up with her wounds fully healed. Meanwhile, the Crime Sorcière guild senses the nefarious aura, and Jellal proceeds to the Domus Flau audience, oblivious that he bumped into Doranbolt, who, in turn, wonders what is Mystogan doing in Earthland.
170	170	"Small Fists"; Transliteration: "Chiisana Kobushi" (Japanese: 小さな拳)	Directed by : Hazuki Mizumoto; Storyboarded by : Hiroyuki Fukushima	Masashi Sogo	Futoshi Higashide	February 23, 2013	—
With Sherria being fully healed and Wendy being almost depleted of magic power, their battle continues, with the former casting a high-level spell towards the latter. However, it seems that Wendy enhances Sherria's physical strength, causing the attack to gain much force and thus missing Wendy. The two competitors then engage in a hand-to-hand combat, but due to the time limit and neither side is giving up, their battle resulted in a draw, giving both teams 5 points. Meanwhile, Jellal manages to track the sinister aura among the crowd in the form of a hooded stranger. Jellal is about to confront the aura source, but he is abruptly cornered by Doranbolt, Lahar, and other Rune Knights. Doranbalt then interrogates Jellal, and as his cover was blown, the Rune Knights, as well as Kagura and Milliana glancing nearby, are startled to see the true identity of Mystogan. Yajima convinces the Rune Knights that Mystogan is Jellal's Edolas counterpart, prompting Lahar to release the fugitive. Meanwhile, Laxus and Makarov have a small conversation regarding Lumen Histoire when Mavis appears and explains that Lumen Histoire is the ‘light’ of Fairy Tail.
171	171	"Naval Battle"; Transliteration: "Nabaru Batoru" (Japanese: 海戦(ナバルバトル))	Noriaki Saito	Fumihiko Shimo	Jiemon Futsuzawa	March 2, 2013	—
As the jubilant Fairy Tail members celebrate their victories, the other people, such as Sting, Kagura, and Milliana, are contemplating on their own concerns, while Yukino is enlisted as a sergeant under Arcadios' command. Meanwhile, the fourth day of the competitions comes to a start with an event, "Naval Battle", which involves the participants swimming in a giant water sphere and knocking the other competitors out. After the other participants fall out of the aquatic sphere, a five-minute battle between Lucy and Minerva ensues. However, Minerva quickly attacks Lucy, and she manages to steal the keys of the Celestial Spirit mage. Regardless of this, Lucy refuses to surrender. After hearing Lucy's intentions, Minerva stops from attacking up to the extent that the five-minute mark was reached. However, Minerva resumes attacking Lucy until the game officials decide to halt the match. The Fairy Tail members snap, and Minerva dangles Lucy out of the sphere while the others rush to her aid.
172	172	"A Parfum for You"; Transliteration: "Kimi ni Sasageru Parufamu" (Japanese: 君に捧げる香り(パルファム))	Directed by : Mamoru Enomoto; Storyboarded by : Hiroyuki Fukushima	Shoji Yonemura	Tomohiro Koyama	March 9, 2013	—
While Lucy is hospitalized and taken to the infirmary, the Fairy Tail members warn Saber Tooth that they have angered the worst possible guild to do so. Later, Makarov announces that the two Fairy Tail teams must merge as a result of the disqualification of Raven Tail and to compensate for the odd number of teams for the battle round. He also reveals that the new team will have the former Team A's 35 points to start with. The new Fairy Tail team, consisting of Natsu, Gray, Erza, Gajeel, and Laxus, are well-received as they enter the field. The second part of the tournament begins with a tag battle between Blue Pegasus' Ichiya and "Rabbit" and Quatro Puppy's Rocker and Bacchus. To everyone's shock, it is revealed that "Rabbit" is actually Nichiya in disguise, and after the Exceed is punched by Bacchus, Ichiya bulks up to defeat the Quatro Puppy opponents, awarding Blue Pegasus with 10 points.
173	173	"Battle of Dragon Slayers"; Transliteration: "Batoru obu Doragon Sureiyā" (Japanese: バトル・オブ・ドラゴンスレイヤー)	Junichi Wada	Fumihiko Shimo	Masanori Iizuka	March 16, 2013	—
Mermaid Heel's Kagura and Milliana and Lamia Scale's Lyon and Yuka face off for the second tag battle of the games. The two teams struggle to earn a victory, only to have their battle ending in a draw due to the time limit. For the third and final match of the day, the spectators look on in silence as Natsu and Gajeel of Team Fairy Tail and Sting and Rogue of Team Saber Tooth enter the field. As the battle commences, Sting and Rogue were about to take the initiative when they were suddenly attacked by Natsu and Gajeel. The four mages then exchange attacks; however, the audience watches in shock as the Fairy Tail Dragon Slayers overpower the Saber Tooth Dragon Slayers. Unable to keep themselves on par with their adversaries, Sting activates 'White Drive' while Rogue powers up using 'Shadow Drive'.
174	174	"Four Dragons"; Transliteration: "Yonin no Doragon" (Japanese: 四人の竜(ドラゴン))	Directed by : Tsuyoshi Tobita; Storyboarded by : Shinji Ishihira	Atsuhiro Tomioka	Nobuharu Ishido	March 23, 2013	—
The tag battle continues, with Sting and Rogue beginning to attack Natsu and Gajeel with their powers being increased. After receiving heavy blows from the Saber Tooth Dragon Slayers, Natsu and Gajeel manages to hold them off, thus forcing Sting and Rogue to activate "Dragon Force" on their own will, to the shock of the Fairy Tail audience. Sting decides to finish the Fairy Tail Dragon Slayers alone, for he held a promise to his Exceed friend Lector many years ago. As the three mages fight, the tide turns in favor of Sting as he unleashes a powerful attack on Natsu and Gajeel, resulting in the collapse of the arena floor, and after a hand-to-hand combat underground, Sting was seemingly the victor of the match. However, the Fairy Tail duo stands up, comments on Sting’s strength, and argues about his position while attacking, thereby causing Natsu to drag Gajeel on a mining cart and send it away. While Gajeel is left incapacitated due to motion sickness, Natsu challenges the Twin Dragons of Saber Tooth alone, in retribution to what Sting did earlier on them.
175	175	"Natsu vs. the Twin Dragons"; Transliteration: "Natsu bāsasu Sōryū" (Japanese: ナツ vs. 双竜)	Directed by : Kazunobu Fuseki; Storyboarded by : Shinji Ishihira	Masashi Sogo	Hiroki Ikeshita	March 30, 2013	—
The tag battle of the Dragon Slayers comes to a close, with Natsu overpowering the combined attacks of Sting and Rogue. The Saber Tooth members watch in dismay, while Ziemma seethes in anger over the defeat of the Twin Dragons, frightening the nearby spectators away. The rest of Fairy Tail celebrates in joy as its team receives 10 points, finally surpassing Team Saber Tooth by a single point. Meanwhile, Gajeel, back to his senses after being dragged by Natsu into a cart earlier, stumbles upon a cave full of dragon skeletons. During that night, Jellal manages to corner the source of the dark aura, standing in disbelief at the identity of the stranger.

== Music ==
=== Opening themes ===
No.	Song Title	Artist	Episodes
1	"Snow Fairy"	Funkist	1–14
2	"S.O.W. Sense of Wonder"	Idoling!!!	15–24
3	"ft."	Funkist	25–35
4	"R.P.G. ~Rockin' Playing Game"	SuG	36–48
5	"Egao no Mahou"	Magic Party	49–60
6	"Fiesta"	+Plus	61–72
7	"Evidence"	Daisy x Daisy	73–85
8	"The Rock City Boy"	JAMIL	86–98
9	"Towa no Kizuna"	Daisy x Daisy feat. Another Infinity	99–111
10	"I Wish"	Milky Bunny	112–124
11	"Hajimari no Sora"	+Plus	125–137
12	"Tenohira"	HERO	138–150
13	"Breakthrough"	Going Under Ground	151–166
14	"Yakusoku no Hi"	Chihiro Yonekura	167–175

=== Ending themes ===
No.	Song Title	Artist	Episodes
1	"Kanpeki gu~no ne"	Watarirouka Hashiritai	1–14
2	"Tsunaide Te"	Chihiro Yonekura	15–24
3	"Gomen ne, Watashi"	Shiho Nanba	25–35
4	"Kimi ga Iru Kara"	Mikuni Shimokawa	36–48
5	"Holy Shine"	Daisy x Daisy	49–60
6	"-Be As One-"	w-inds.	61–72
7	"Lonely Person"	ShaNa	73–85
8	"Don't think. Feel!!!"	Idoling!!!	86–98
9	"Kono Te Nobashite"	Hi-Fi Camp	99–111
10	"Boys Be Ambitious!!"	Hi-Fi Camp	112–124
11	"Glitter (Starving Trancer Remix)"	Another Infinity feat. Mayumi Morinaga	125–137
12	"Yell: Kagayaku Tame no Mono"	Sata Andagi	138–150
13	"Kimi ga Kureta Mono"	Shizuka Kudo	151–166
14	"We're the Stars"	Aimi	167–175
