= List of Edens Zero chapters =

Cover of the first volume of Edens Zero as published by Kodansha on September 14, 2018

Edens Zero is a Japanese shōnen manga series written and illustrated by Hiro Mashima. It was serialized in Kodansha's Weekly Shōnen Magazine from June 27, 2018, to June 26, 2024. The story follows a boy named Shiki Granbell who embarks on a voyage aboard the titular starship across different planets in search of a cosmic goddess known as "Mother". The chapters have been collected in thirty-three tankōbon volumes from September 2018 through June 2024. The manga has also inspired a television anime and video game adaptation.

The series is published simultaneously in six different languages: English, French, Chinese, Korean, Thai, and Brazilian Portuguese. North American publisher Kodansha USA has released chapters of the series on digital platforms such as Crunchyroll Manga, ComiXology, and Amazon Kindle. The English tankōbon volumes were released from November 2018 through September 2025.

== Volumes ==
| No. | Title | Original release date | English release date |
|---|---|---|---|
| 1 | Into the Sky Where Cherry Blossoms Flutter; Sakura Mau Sora ni (桜舞うソラに) | September 14, 2018; 978-4-06-513234-0; 978-4-06-513235-7 (SE) | November 6, 2018; 978-1-63-236756-3 |
1. "Into the Sky Where Cherry Blossoms Flutter" (桜舞うソラに, Sakura Mau Sora ni); 2. "A Girl and Her Blue Cat" (少女と青猫, Shōjo to Ao Neko); 3. "Adventurers" (冒険者たち, Bōkensha-tachi); 4. "Norma" (ノーマ, Nōma)
A human boy named Shiki is raised by a community of robots at the Granbell Kingdom, an abandoned theme park. The park is visited by two content-creating B-Cubers—Rebecca Bluegarden and her robotic cat, Happy—whom Shiki befriends. When the park's robots turn hostile and declare revenge against humans for their neglect, Shiki rescues Rebecca with his gravity Ether Gear, a power taught to him by the park's deceased Demon King robot, Ziggy. Rebecca and Happy help Shiki escape the planet Granbell aboard their ship, the Aqua Wing, revealing themselves as space travelers. The robots break down from old age shortly afterwards, having staged their rebellion to save Shiki from solitude. Arriving at the planet Blue Garden, the three register Shiki into the adventurers guild Shooting Starlight, where he learns of a seemingly mythical goddess called Mother. Deciding to find Mother after the guild ridicules Shiki for claiming he has seen her before, the three travel to the planet Norma to acquire a more spaceworthy ship from Rebecca and Happy's benefactor, Professor Weisz Steiner. At Weisz's house, they are confronted by an unfamiliar youth with the professor's name.
| 2 | Iron Tears; Tetsu no Namida (鉄の涙) | November 16, 2018; 978-4-06-513249-4 | February 5, 2019; 978-1-63-236757-0 |
5. "A Man Named Weisz" (ワイズという男, Waizu to Iu Otoko); 6. "Thief" (盗賊(シーフ), Shīfu) (Note: The kanji 盗賊, glossed with furigana as Shīfu (シーフ), are normally read as Tōzoku ("thief").); 7. "Iron Tears" (鉄の涙, Tetsu no Namida); 8. "Clash!! The Sibir Family" (激突!! シビルファミリー, Gekitotsu!! Shibiru Famirī); 9. "Vs. The Foote Brothers" (vs. フットブラザーズ, vs. Futto Burazāzu); 10. "We're Friends, Aren't We?" (友達だろ, Tomodachi Daro); 11. "Machina Maker" (マキナ・メイカー, Makina Meikā); 12. "The Skull Fairy" (スカルフェアリー号, Sukaru Fearī-gō); 13. "Shiki vs. Elsie" (シキ vs. エルシー, Shiki vs. Erushī); 14. "Born Again" (もう一度生まれる, Mō Ichido Umareru)
Shiki and his friends discover that they have traveled fifty years to Norma's past, recognizing the youth as Weisz's younger self, who has stolen a briefcase from the criminal Sibir. The briefcase contains E.M. Pino, an android from the present era whose memory has been erased by Sibir, who has been using her EMP to commit crimes. After Shiki defeats Sibir and rescues Pino, the group takes her off Norma with the help of the younger Weisz, whose "Machina Maker" Ether Gear modifies the Aqua Wing to bypass a spacetime barrier surrounding the planet. The present-day Weisz contacts the group, explaining that the "past" they experienced was an alternate history created by the Chronophage, a space monster that devoured fifty years of Norma's time. The group is suddenly captured by the space pirate Elsie Crimson, whose ship, the Skull Fairy, is infested with alien parasites mimicking Elsie and her crew. When the group defeats the parasites, Elsie rewards them with the Skull Fairy, which she reveals to be Shiki's inheritance from Ziggy, Pino's creator.
| 3 | Warship of the Demon King; Maō Senkan (魔王戦艦) | February 15, 2019; 978-4-06-513875-5 | June 4, 2019; 978-1-63-236758-7 |
15. "Warship of the Demon King" (魔王戦艦, Maō Senkan); 16. "Sister" (シスター, Shisutā); 17. "The Collection" (コレクション, Korekushon); 18. "Wind Howls on the Highway" (風の鳴くハイウェイ, Kaze no Naku Haiwei); 19. "Geniuses at Coming Up with Fun Ideas" (楽しい事を考える天才, Tanoshii Koto o Kangaeru Tensai); 20. "Planet Guilst" (惑星ギルスト, Wakusei Girusuto); 21. "Soul Blade" (ソウルブレイド, Sōru Bureido); 22. "The Great Naked Escape" (裸の脱出作戦, Hadaka no Dasshutsu Sakusen); 23. "Million Bullets" (ミリオンバレット, Mirion Baretto)
Shiki's group activates an android woman aboard the Skull Fairy named Witch Regret, a former crewmate of Ziggy who reverts the ship to its true form, the battleship Edens Zero. Witch advises the crew to reassemble her group, the Demon King's Four Shining Stars, to prepare for the voyage beyond Dragonfall, a swarm of dragons separating the Sakura Cosmos from the outer regions of space. While revisiting Blue Garden to investigate Sister Ivry, one of the Shining Stars, Shiki saves Rebecca's B-Cube rival Labilia Christy from being kidnapped by Jinn, a cyborg mercenary and wind Ether Gear user from Sister's mercenary squad, Rogue Out. During Shiki's absence, Rebecca is kidnapped by Rogue Out and sold to the lawless planet Guilst. To help rescue Rebecca, Weisz enlists Homura Kōgetsu, a wandering Ether Gear user and swordswoman who is familiar with Edens Zero. Shiki's crew follows Rebecca to Sister's headquarters on Guilst, where Rebecca rallies her fellow captives to escape and reunites with Shiki. As Shiki battles with Rogue Out, Witch detects the Chronophage approaching Guilst.
| 4 | New Friends; Arata na Nakama-tachi (新たな仲間たち) | April 17, 2019; 978-4-06-514881-5 | September 10, 2019; 978-1-63-236824-9 |
24. "Sister Ivry" (シスター・イヴリィ, Shisutā Ivurii); 25. "Take Aim" (狙いをさだめて, Nerai o Sadamete); 26. "Two Sisters" (二人のシスター, Futari no Shisutā); 27. "The Great Guilst Escape" (ギルスト脱出作戦, Girusuto Dasshutsu Sakusen); 28. "New Friends" (新たな仲間たち, Arata na Nakama-tachi); 29. "Iron Hill" (アイアンヒル, Aian Hiru); 30. "The Super Virtual Planet" (超仮想惑星, Chōkasō Wakusei); 31. "The People of Digitalis" (デジタリスの民, Dejitarisu no Tami); 32. "Mass Murderer Jamilov" (殺人鬼ジャミロフ, Satsujinki Jamirofu)
Weisz and Homura discover that Rogue Out's leader has been impersonating Sister when they find the real Sister trapped beneath Rogue Out's headquarters. After Shiki defeats Rogue Out, Sister ousts her imposter and recovers her stolen healing powers. Alerted to the Chronophage's approach by Witch, Shiki's crew leaves Jinn with the imposter, whom he kills for her deception, having sought Sister out to treat his younger sister, Kleene. Edens Zero and the captives escape with Sister and her servant Mosco Versa-0 before Guilst's time is consumed by the Chronophage. The crew quickly finds another of the Four Shining Stars, Hermit Mio, who has secluded her mind within the virtual planet Digitalis, a server for the simulated reality game Rogue Fantasia. Shiki's team enters the game to search for Hermit, but are impeded by Jamilov, a mass murderer and Rogue Fantasia player who works for Drakken Joe, one of six intergalactic outlaws called the Oración Seis Galáctica.
| 5 | Fireworks; Hanabi (花火) | June 17, 2019; 978-4-06-515677-3 | December 10, 2019; 978-1-63-236788-4 |
33. "The Girl on the Hill" (丘の上の少女, Oka no Ue no Shōjo); 34. "Survive the Night" (この夜を生き抜け, Kono Yoru o Ikinuke); 35. "The Girl and the Monster" (怪物と少女, Kaibutsu to Shōjo); 36. "The G.I.A." (Note: "GIA" in the original Japanese release.); 37. "Great Kaiju Shiki" (大怪獣シキ, Daikaijū Shiki); 38. "22 Hits" (22発, Nijūni-hatsu); 39. "Spider the Genius Hacker" (天才ハッカー・スパイダー, Tensai Hakkā Supaidā); 40. "Operation C7" (C7号作戦, Shī-nana-gō Sakusen); 41. "Fireworks" (花火, Hanabi)
Shiki's group avoids being killed by Jamilov, who uses cheats to make himself invincible. They soon find Hermit and attempt to recruit her, but she rejects them out of hatred for humans, having been deceived and tortured by cruel human scientists in the past. Homura appears to betray the crew by allying with Jamilov, but is exposed as an imposter, the shapeshifting government spy Amira, who is chased away by the real Homura. Hermit begrudgingly helps Shiki defeat Jamilov with her own cheats, and is surprised by Shiki's compassion for Digitalis' sentient NPCs when Jamilov spitefully attempts to delete them, prompting her to save the NPCs. After Hermit agrees to tentatively exit the game, Edens Zero is hacked by Jamilov's real-life persona, Spider, who begins destroying the ship from the inside. With Shiki's encouragement, Hermit accepts the crew's friendship and restores Edens Zero's security systems, humiliating Spider and saving the ship.
| 6 | Words Will Give You Strength; Kotoba wa Tsuyosa o Ataeru (言葉は強さを与える) | September 17, 2019; 978-4-06-516233-0 | February 18, 2020; 978-1-63-236833-1 |
42. "Pino's Dream" (ピーノの夢, Pīno no Yume); 43. "Smells Like Money" (金の匂い, Kane no Nioi); 44. "The Temple of Knowledge" (知識の宮殿, Chishiki no Kyūden); 45. "The Battle Coliseum" (バトルコロシアム, Batoru Koroshiamu); 46. "Footsteps of the Warrior Maiden" (戦乙女の足音, Ikusa Otome no Ashioto); 47. "Words Will Give You Strength" (言葉は強さを与える, Kotoba wa Tsuyosa o Ataeru); 48. "From the Planet of Eternity" (永永無窮の星より, Eiei Mukyū no Hoshi Yori); 49. "Captain Connor" (キャプテン・コナー, Kyaputen Konā); 50. "Madame Kurenai" (紅婦人, Kurenai Fujin)
Drakken has Spider executed for his incompetence against the Edens Zero crew. Seeking to recuperate his lost wealth from the destruction of Guilst, Drakken contacts Noah Glenfield, Shooting Starlight's master, for information on Edens Zero. Meanwhile, the crew travels to the planet Mildian to consult the oracle Xiaomei over the whereabouts of Valkyrie Yuna, the last of the Four Shining Stars and Homura's mentor. After winning a series of battles for Xiaomei's amusement, including a duel between Homura and a training robot disguised as a replica of Valkyrie, the crew is directed to the planet Sun Jewel. Along the way, the crew rescues Connor, the shipwrecked captain of a spaceship called Edens One, who navigates a hazardous debris field to bring them to Sun Jewel. After thwarting a robbery attempt on the planet, Shiki and Homura witness the robbers' immediate execution by the planet's ruler, Madame Kurenai, using her Satellite Blaze weapon.
| 7 | I Know You Can Keep Pressing On; Kitto Mae e Susumeru (きっと前へ進める) | November 15, 2019; 978-4-06-516893-6 | April 7, 2020; 978-1-63-236981-9 |
51. "Stones" (鉱石生命体(ストーンズ), Sutōnzu) (Note: The kanji 鉱石生命体, glossed with furigana as Sutōnzu (ストーンズ), are normally read as Kōseki Seimeitai ("mineral lifeform").); 52. "Kurenai's Gauntlet" (紅の籠手, Kurenai no Kote); 53. "Wibble Wobble Ruby Bobble" (ポヨポヨ ルビーちゃん, Poyo Poyo Rubī-chan); 54. "The Truth Is in the Cube" (真実はキューブの中に, Shinjitsu wa Kyūbu no Naka ni); 55. "Black Rock" (ブラックロック, Burakku Rokku); 56. "Reset" (リセット, Risetto); 57. "My Mother, the Machine" (機械の母, Kikai no Haha); 58. "A Silent Reunion" (沈黙の再会, Chinmoku no Saikai); 59. "I Know You Can Keep Pressing On" (きっと前へ進める, Kitto Mae e Susumeru)
Madame Kurenai's emissaries condemn Shiki and Homura for their violence against the robbers, using Satellite Blaze to send them to Sun Jewel's labor district to mine precious metals from ferocious monsters called Stones. After being publicly humiliated by Labilia, who falsely offers her help as repayment for Shiki saving her, Rebecca is guided to the labor district by Nino, a friendly subordinate of Kurenai. Rebecca's group meets Valkyrie's disciple Paul, who reunites them with Shiki and Homura, allowing the group to slay a massive Stone. Through a B-Cube recording belonging to Paul, it is revealed that Valkyrie left Homura in search of Kurenai, Homura's mother, who abandoned her daughter and betrayed Valkyrie to rise to power. Shiki's team finds Valkyrie's remains afterwards, learning that she died protecting the laborers from a Stone horde provoked by Kurenai. While Homura mourns, Shiki confronts Kurenai to fulfill Valkyrie's promise and have Homura determine her mother's fate.
| 8 | Someone to Love; Aisuru Mono (愛する者) | February 17, 2020; 978-4-06-517355-8 | June 9, 2020 (digital); August 4, 2020 (print); 978-1-63-236982-6 |
60. "Until the Day It Turns to Strength" (いつか強さに変わるまで, Itsuka Tsuyosa ni Kawaru Made); 61. "Enter Arsenal" (アーセナル参上, Āsenaru Sanjō); 62. "The Legend of Me" (オレの伝説, Ore no Densetsu); 63. "Taking Up the Torch" (意志を継ぐ者, Ishi o Tsugu Mono); 64. "Leaper" (跳躍者(リーパー), Rīpā) (Note: The kanji 跳躍者, glossed with furigana as Rīpā (リーパー), are normally read as Chōyakusha ("leaper").); 65. "The Swordswoman Incapacitated" (剣士は動けない, Kenshi wa Ugokenai); 66. "Gravity's Gonna Crush You" (重力がおまえを潰す, Jūryoku ga Omae o Tsubusu); 67. "Someone to Love" (愛する者, Aisuru Mono); 68. "Valkyrie" (ヴァルキリー, Varukirī)
Drakken confiscates Kurenai's Satellite Blaze for her attempts to double-cross him in a dispute over Edens Zero. In response, Kurenai activates her Knight Gear mech, the Kurenai Dragoon, which she uses to battle Shiki. She sends her elite minions, the Zaiten Three, to quell the laborers' uprising, but they are each defeated by Shiki's friends: Weisz uses his newly completed "Arsenal" battle suit to defeat Baku; Rebecca subdues Nino after awakening her speed-enhancing Ether Gear, "Leaper", oblivious to its ability to reverse time; and Homura impales Garrot with Valkyrie's sword, reinvigorated by her friends' support. Upon destroying the Kurenai Dragoon, Shiki brings Kurenai to Homura, who declares Valkyrie to be her true mother and renounces Kurenai. Attempting to flee, Kurenai is captured by a gang of delinquents led by a vengeful man whose face she disfigured. The team returns to Edens Zero to report Valkyrie's death to the other Shining Stars, who mournfully accept Homura's offer to become the new Valkyrie.
| 9 | Don't Shed a Tear; Nami o Nagasu na (涙を流すな) | April 17, 2020; 978-4-06-518522-3 | September 15, 2020; 978-1-63-236983-3 |
69. "Rebecca's Nightmare" (レベッカの見た夢は…, Rebekka no Mita Yume wa...); 70. "Belial Goer" (ベリアル・ゴア, Beriaru Goa); 71. "The Steel Sorceress" (鋼鉄の魔女, Kōtetsu no Majo); 72. "The Element 4" (エレメント4, Eremento Fō); 73. "Don't Shed a Tear" (涙を流すな, Nami o Nagasu na); 74. "Weisz vs. Laguna" (ワイズ vs. ラグナ, Waizu vs. Raguna); 75. "A Wind Blows Through the Sakura Cosmos" (桜宇宙(サクラコスモス)に吹く風, Sakura Kosumosu ni Fuku Kaze) (Note: The kanji 桜宇宙, glossed with furigana as Sakura Kosumosu (サクラコスモス), are normally read as Sakura Uchū ("cherry blossom cosmos").); 76. "Rebecca vs. Sylph" (レベッカ vs. シルフ, Rebekka vs. Shirufu); 77. "The Winds That Bind" (風の絆, Kaze no Kizuna)
Rebecca falls asleep in Edens Zero's bath and dreams of herself and an older Shiki battling an army of machines, during which Shiki informs her that Happy is long dead. Upon awakening, Rebecca discovers that Shiki has led their friends aboard Drakken's space fortress, the Belial Goer, to investigate his pursuit of their ship. The group is quickly discovered and publicly exposed by Drakken, who sends a trio of infiltrators aboard Edens Zero. When Witch defeats the infiltrators, Drakken dispatches his element-wielding special forces, the Element 4, and initiates a manhunt for Shiki's team. Weisz defeats the Element 4's water user, Laguna Husert, but is shot by the fire user, Fie. The team is sheltered by Sibir's present-day counterpart, who works as a bartender aboard the Belial Goer. Attempting to deliver medicine for Weisz, Rebecca and Happy are captured and brought before Drakken by Kleene Rutherford, the emotionally-suppressed wind user and younger sister of Jinn, who serves as her assistant.
| 10 | Our Future; Ore-tachi no Mirai (オレたちの未来) | June 17, 2020; 978-4-06-519436-2 | February 2, 2021; 978-1-64-651037-5 |
78. "No. 29" (29号, Nijūkyū-gō); 79. "That Which Obstructs and That Which Steals" (拒む者と奪う者, Kobamu Mono to Ubau Mono); 80. "60-Day Commemorative Coin" (60日記念コイン, Rokujū-nichi Kinen Koin); 81. "Intercession" (仲裁, Chūsai); 82. "Scolding" (説教, Sekkyō); 83. "The Shot Heard Round the Underworld" (地下道に響く銃声, Chikadō ni Hibiku Jūsei); 84. "A World Without Shiki" (シキがいない世界, Shiki ga Inai Sekai); 85. "Our Future" (オレたちの未来, Ore-tachi no Mirai); 86. "EZ-Attack!!"
Drakken invites Rebecca to join his group so that he can extract her Ether Gear, which he redubs "Cat Leaper". To Rebecca's horror, Drakken reveals he has had Labilia captured and brutally beaten as a token of goodwill, and leaves them in a cell under the watch of Daichi, the Element 4's earth user. Eventually, Shiki's team is captured by Drakken and the rest of the Element 4, while Sibir is killed by Fie for harboring the team. Drakken intimidates the group into submission, persuading Rebecca to join him for their release and having Weisz's arm severed as a warning, while Edens Zero is seized by his infiltration team, who are revealed to have faked their earlier defeat. Refusing to surrender, Shiki is executed by Drakken. After one week under Drakken's captivity, the traumatized Rebecca unwittingly activates her Cat Leaper in the shower, causing her to travel back in time to the moment before her friends leave to infiltrate the Belial Goer. Using Rebecca's knowledge of the future, the crew thwarts Drakken's infiltrators and directly attacks the Belial Goer to rescue Labilia.
| 11 | Shiki vs. Drakken; Shiki vs. Dorakken (シキ vs. ドラッケン) | August 17, 2020; 978-4-06-520331-6 | May 4, 2021; 978-1-64-651038-2 |
87. "4 on 4" (Note: "4 vs. 4" in the original Japanese release.); 88. "Eye of God" (ゴッドアイ, Goddo Ai); 89. "Hermit vs. Fie" (ハーミット vs. ファイ, Hāmitto vs. Fai); 90. "Sister vs. Daichi" (シスター vs. ダイチ, Shisutā vs. Daichi); 91. "Homura vs. Sylph" (ホムラ vs. シルフ, Homura vs. Shirufu); 92. "The Sword of Edens" (エデンズの剣, Edenzu no Tsurugi); 93. "The Execution Site" (処刑場, Shokeijō); 94. "Shiki vs. Drakken" (シキ vs. ドラッケン, Shiki vs. Dorakken); 95. "Kris Rutherford" (クリス・ラザフォード, Kurisu Razafōdo)
The Four Shining Stars defeat the Element 4, with Homura discovering that Kleene suffers from a fragile mental state that causes severe nervous meltdowns whenever she experiences emotion. Meanwhile, Shiki's team is contacted by Noah, who explains that he has been using Rebecca's time-leaping ability as part of a plan to defeat Drakken. After freeing Labilia, the team is guided to a safe location by Sibir, who reveals that Drakken has been absorbing others' life force to maintain his youth for over 200 years; Rebecca deduces that Drakken needs Cat Leaper because he is overtaxing his body. Labilia suddenly reveals herself to be a disguised Amira, having long-rescued the real Labilia as part of an undercover mission to thwart Drakken. Discovered by Drakken, Shiki battles him as a distraction while Amira directs the others in reversing Drakken's life-support machine to weaken him, gaining Jinn's cooperation when Amira explains the machine's threat to Kleene's life.
| 12 | Advent of the Demon King; Maō Kōrin (魔王降臨) | October 16, 2020; 978-4-06-521010-9 | September 28, 2021; 978-1-64-651151-8 |
96. "A Young Man's Memories" (少年の記憶, Shōnen no Kioku); 97. "The Time Is Now" (今がその時, Ima ga Sono Toki); 98. "Advent of the Demon King" (魔王降臨, Maō Kōrin); 99. "The Pendant" (ペンダント, Pendanto); 100. "Edens One"; 101. "Singularity" (シンギュラリティ, Shingyurariti); 102. "Time to Say Goodbye" (別れの時, Wakare no Toki); 103. "Clash of the Cosmos" (激闘の宇宙(ソラ), Gekitō no Sora) (Note: The kanji 宇宙, glossed with furigana as Sora (ソラ; "sky"), are normally read as Uchū ("space").); 104. "The Woman They Called Pirate" (海賊と呼ばれ女, Kaizoku to Yobare Onna)
The Edens Zero crew reverses Drakken's life-draining machine, but the process mutates Drakken into a rampaging monster. Shiki regains some of his memories from the previous timeline and enters Overdrive, a state of heightened power that allows him to defeat Drakken, while Edens Zero destroys Drakken's Satellite Blaze before it can annihilate Blue Garden. Jinn and Kleene become passengers aboard Edens Zero for Sister to treat Kleene's mental disorder, while Rebecca notices Connor's absence from the ship, with no one else remembering his existence. Deciding to revisit Granbell before leaving the Sakura Cosmos, Shiki discovers his robots friends' deaths before being attacked by a reactivated Ziggy, who declares his intent for machines to rule humankind and destroys Granbell. The crew battles Ziggy and his ship, Edens One, which has not been destroyed in the current timeline and is helmed by Connor. Edens One is driven back by Elsie, who leaves to pursue Ziggy, allowing Edens Zero to resume their voyage and reach Dragonfall.
| 13 | Dragonfall; Doragonfōru (ドラゴンフォール) | January 15, 2021; 978-4-06-521480-0 | October 19, 2021; 978-1-64-651223-2 |
105. "Dragonfall" (ドラゴンフォール, Doragonfōru); 106. "Prayer Council" (祈りの間, Inori no Ma); 107. "A Planet Where Stars Fall Like Rain" (星降る惑星, Hoshi Furu Wakusei); 108. "Nadia, Love of My Life" (我が最愛のナディア, Waga Saiai no Nadia); 109. "Red Cave" (赤い洞窟(レッドケイブ), Reddo Keibu) (Note: The kanji 赤い洞窟, glossed with furigana as Reddo Keibu (レッドケイブ), are normally read as Akai Dōkutsu ("red cave").); 110. "A Robot in Love" (恋する機械, Koisuru Kikai); 111. "The Sky of Days Long Past" (いつか見たあの空を, Itsuka Mita Ano Sora o); 112. "When You Live Life on a Ship" (船で生きる者, Fune de Ikiru Mono); 113. "In the Doghouse" (犬になる, Inu ni Naru)
Edens Zero crosses Dragonfall into the Aoi Cosmos, where the crew investigates the oceanic planet Red Cave for clues about Mother's location. Following a downed spaceship with human remains inside, the crew finds an underwater ruin inhabited by Nadia, the dead human's android lover, who guards a volcanic tunnel containing a beacon to Mother. Witch warps to Blue Garden to recruit Laguna, who has been in hiding since Drakken's arrest, promising him safe passage from the Sakura Cosmos in exchange for his aid. Laguna's water Ether Gear allows Shiki to safely reach the end of the tunnel, where he collects a leftover supply of Mother's Ether from a mystical relic imbued with it. After helping Nadia cope with her lover's death, the crew traces the Ether to another relic on the planet Foresta, where its human population has been subjugated by the local robots. Shiki's group is aided by Rebecca's traveling B-Cuber friend Couchpo, who informs them that the robots have fallen under Ziggy's control.
| 14 | Star Drain; Sutā Dorein (スタードレイン) | March 17, 2021; 978-4-06-521639-2 | December 21, 2021 (digital); January 4, 2022 (print); 978-1-64-651285-0 |
114. "Glue" (接着剤, Setchakuzai); 115. "The Battle of Foresta" (フォレスタの戦い, Foresuta no Tatakai); 116. "The Sky Sweeper" (空中の掃除人, Kūchū no Sōjinin); 117. "Shiki vs. Orc" (シキ vs. オーク, Shiki vs. Ōku); 118. "Star Drain" (スタードレイン, Sutā Dorein); 119. "Homura vs. Mora" (ホムラ vs. モラ); 120. "Rebecca vs. Britney" (レベッカ vs. ブリトニー, Rebekka vs. Buritonī); 121. "Darling Little Piece of Junk" (愛しいガラクタちゃん, Itoshii Garakuta-chan); 122. "Titan of Victory" (勝利の巨人, Shōri no Kyojin)
Hermit determines that Foresta's robots have been infected by a computer virus transmitted from a giant server satellite, which risks spreading to the Four Shining Stars. Shiki's team comes into conflict with the commando team Beast, who are indiscriminately targeting infected and uninfected robots as ordered by the Aoi Cosmos' emperor, Poseidon Nero of the Oración Seis Galáctica. After Shiki's team defeats Beast's "Squad 6", they are saved from the more powerful "Squad 1" by Justice, Victory, and Creed, a trio of officers from the Interstellar Union Army. Justice becomes hostile upon realizing Shiki's familiarity with Elsie—his nemesis and another of the Galáctica—and uses his authority as one of the army's elite Oración Seis Interstellar to fight Shiki to the death. Meanwhile, Hermit brings Weisz to the server to help reverse the virus' effects, but finds the satellite guarded by a cybernetically enhanced Müller, the mad scientist responsible for torturing Hermit in the past.
| 15 | So We Can Smile Brighter; Takusan Warau Tame ni (たくさん笑う為に) | May 17, 2021; 978-4-06-523141-8 | February 22, 2022; 978-1-64-651286-7 |
123. "The Light of Justice" (正義の光, Seigi no Hikari); 124. "Kiss & Die"; 125. "Heart of Gravity" (重心, Jūshin); 126. "The Doctor, Armed and Dangerous" (その博士､ 狂暴につき, Sono Hakase, Kyōbō ni Tsuki); 127. "The Doomsday System" (終末システム, Shūmatsu Shisutemu); 128. "What's Important" (大切なもの, Taisetsu na Mono); 129. "So We Can Smile Brighter" (たくさん笑う為に, Takusan Warau Tame ni); 130. "Oceans 6" (オーシャンズ6, Ōshanzu Shikkusu); 131. "VR-C" (Note: Read as "VR-Sync")
Shiki is rescued from Justice by Elsie, who duels Justice to a stalemate, and Xenolith, Ziggy's robotic mentor, who uses his gravity abilities to immobilize everyone on Foresta. Meanwhile, Müller boasts his responsibility for Jinn's cybernetic conversion and Kleene's mental trauma, having experimented on them as children in a vendetta against their family. When Kleene suffers a near-fatal breakdown over Müller's presence, Sister uncovers and erases her suppressed memories of the event, curing Kleene of her condition. Weisz defeats Müller with Laguna's help, which allows Hermit to free the planet's robots from Ziggy's control. Jinn and Kleene permanently join the Edens Zero crew out of gratitude while Couchpo remains aboard the ship after being impressed by its kitchen. Xenolith trains the crew to prepare them against Ziggy, who continues to incite robot uprisings across the Aoi Cosmos. Meanwhile, Nero entrusts control of the situation to his adoptive human son, Poseidon Shura, a sadistic gravity Ether Gear user.
| 16 | Prelude to the Aoi War (Note: Stylized as "Prelude to the AOI War".); Aoi Taisen no Jokyoku (葵大戦の序曲) | July 16, 2021; 978-4-06-524027-4 | April 26, 2022; 978-1-64-651445-8 |
132. "Chrono Witch" (時の魔女, Toki no Majo); 133. "Following Ziggy's Path" (ジギーの軌跡, Jigī no Kiseki); 134. "Judgment Day" (ジャッジメント・デイ, Jajjimento Dei); 135. "Desert Oasis" (砂漠のオアシス, Sabaku no Oashisu); 136. "Goodwin" (グッドウィン, Guddowin); 137. "Empire Dice" (帝国歴程(エンパイアダイス), Enpaia Daisu) (Note: The kanji 帝国歴程, glossed with furigana as Enpaia Daisu (エンパイアダイス), are normally read as Teikoku Rekitei ("imperial route").); 138. "Prelude to the Aoi War" (葵大戦の序曲, Aoi Taisen no Jokyoku); 139. "White Flash" (白い閃光, Shiroi Senkō); 140. "Charge!! To Planet Nero 66" (突入!! 惑星ネロ66, Totsunyū!! Wakusei Nero Shikkusutī Shikkusu)
After the crew completes their week-long training under Xenolith, Edens Zero leaves Foresta to continue their search for Mother's relics on other planets. They are interrupted when Shura publicly broadcasts his plan to retaliate against Ziggy by eliminating all robots in the Aoi Cosmos, using falsified reports of uprisings on peaceful planets as justification. To stop Shura, Laguna brings the crew to his estranged allies in Oasis, a rebel army that opposes Nero's empire. Oasis informs the crew of the All-Link System, a network that would give Shura influence over all machinery in the Aoi Cosmos when its planets are submerged in the cosmic ocean's high tide. After gaining Oasis' trust by helping them thwart an imperial raid on their hideout, the crew proceeds to the All-Link System's location on the planet Nero 66, where much of its imperial blockade is destroyed by Eraser, one of the Oración Seis Interstellar.
| 17 | A World of Ash; Haiiro no Sekai (灰色の世界) | September 17, 2021; 978-4-06-524836-2 | July 5, 2022; 978-1-64-651472-4 |
141. "A World of Ash" (灰色の世界, Haiiro no Sekai); 142. "Shiki vs. Shura" (シキ vs. シュラ); 143. "You Didn't Do Anything to Deserve This" (おまえたちは悪くねェ, Omaetachi wa Warukunee); 144. "Through the Looking Glass" (鏡世界, Kagami Sekai); 145. "Homura vs. Mirrani" (ホムラ vs. ミラーニ, Homura vs. Mirāni); 146. "Before We Part" (散りゆく前に, Chiriyuku Mae ni); 147. "Rage, Fear, and Grief" (怒りと恐怖と悲しみ, Ikari to Kyōfu to Kanashimi); 148. "Eye of Horus" (アイ・オブ・ホルス, Ai obu Horusu); 149. "Powers Lost" (失った力, Ushinatta Chikara)
Shiki battles Shura on the surface of Nero 66 as a diversion for his crewmates to find the All-Link System. Shura is impressed by Shiki's skill and offers his friendship, but Shiki rejects him for refusing to end his genocidal plans. In retribution, Shura decides to torment Shiki by forcing him to battle an army of robots he has programmed to self-destruct. After the robots defiantly shield Shiki from the explosion for his compassion towards them, Shiki returns to Edens Zero and discovers that Shura has abducted Witch to torment him further, prompting Shiki to go rescue her. Meanwhile, Shiki's friends face members of Oceans 6, the empire's elite special forces; Homura defeats the mirror-controlling member Mirrani Lucra after achieving her own Overdrive form, while the rest of Homura's friends encounter Mirrani's hypnotist teammate Nasseh. While under hypnosis, Rebecca briefly experiences an alternate future in which she has lost her legs, robbing her of her Cat Leaper ability.
| 18 | The False Five; Itsuwari no Go (偽りの5) | November 17, 2021; 978-4-06-525998-6 | August 23, 2022 (digital); September 27, 2022 (print); 978-1-64-651570-7 |
150. "Weisz vs. Nasseh" (ワイズ vs. ナセ, Waizu vs. Nase); 151. "Handprints" (手形, Tegata); 152. "Lost Card" (ロストカード, Rosuto Kādo); 153. "The False Five" (偽りの5, Itsuwari no Go); 154. "Skymech Ninjutsu" (天械流忍術, Tenkai-ryū Ninjutsu); 155. "The Winds of Rutherford" (ラザフォードの風, Razafōdo no Kaze); 156. "The Beast Lord" (獣神, Jūshin); 157. "The Red String of Destiny" (運命の赤い糸, Unmei no Akai Ito); 158. "The Madness of a Man Who Knows No Love" (愛を知らぬ男の狂, Ai o Shiranu Otoko no Kyōki)
Weisz overcomes Nasseh's hypnosis and enters his Overdrive state to defeat him. Shiki attempts to save Rebecca when she is forced into a high-stakes card game against the Ocean 6's Lyra, but is stopped by her teammate Callum Steelford, Jinn's childhood rival. Using her Cat Leaper, Rebecca avoids having her legs severed and stalls Lyra long enough for the arrival of Jinn and Kleene, who defeat Callum and Lyra with their Overdrive forms. Continuing on, Shiki and Rebecca are brainwashed into fighting each other to the death by Ijuna, Shura's secretary. Laguna rescues the pair and recognizes Ijuna as a former Oasis member, who is revealed to have developed Stockholm syndrome for Shura after years of torture and humiliation under his captivity. Meanwhile, the Interstellar Union Army and Oasis unite against the empire as Ziggy, Nero, and Jaguar—one of the Oración Seis Interstellar—converge at the Temple, the imperial capital planet.
| 19 | Scattering in the Starry Aoi Sea (Note: Stylized as "Scattering in the Starry AOI Sea".); Aoi no Umi ni Chiru (葵の宇宙(うみ)に散る (Note: The kanji 宇宙, glossed with furigana as Umi (うみ; "sea"), are normally read as Uchū ("space").)) | February 17, 2022; 978-4-06-526892-6 | October 18, 2022 (digital); November 15, 2022 (print); 978-1-64-651571-4 |
159. "The Strings of Unbreakable Bonds" (絆の糸, Kizuna no Ito); 160. "Scattering in the Starry Aoi Sea" (葵の宇宙(うみ)に散る, Aoi no Umi ni Chiru); 161. "Life Continues to Fade" (さらに命は消えてゆく, Sara ni Inochi wa Kiete Yuku); 162. "Ziggy vs. Nero" (ジギー vs. ネロ, Jigī vs. Nero); 163. "Wormhole" (ワームホール, Wāmuhōru); 164. "Downpour of the Black Heavens" (黒い天空が降り注ぐ, Kuroi Tenkū ga Furisosogu); 165. "Fork in the Road" (分岐点, Bunkiten); 166. "I Love You" (大好き, Daisuki); 167. "Proof in Our Hearts That She Lived" (生きた証を胸に, Ikita Akashi o Mune ni)
Laguna defeats Ijuna while the Interstellar Union Army and Oasis suffer heavy casualties, including Creed, who is accidentally shot by his companion Jesse for allying with Homura, and Jaguar, who is killed by Nero after damaging Ziggy's minions Brigandine and Killer. While Shiki's friends recover the heavily damaged Witch, Shura prepares to use the All-Link System against Ziggy and Nero by obliterating the Temple with its own stockpile of 20,000 anti-matter bombs. Nero, having anticipated Shura's betrayal, uses his secret wormhole Ether Gear to transport the bombs to Nero 66. Shiki defeats Shura while Ziggy kills Nero and absorbs his Ether Gear, which he uses to activate the bombs. Shiki attempts to disarm the bombs, but with Xiaomei's intervention, he opts to evacuate his crew instead. Ijuna leaves Laguna's care to die together with Shura on Nero 66, while Witch perishes after using her force shield to protect Edens Zero from the explosion.
| 20 | 3 Years Later | April 15, 2022; 978-4-06-527525-2 | December 27, 2022; 978-1-64-651572-1 |
168. "The Sea of Stars" (星の海, Hoshi no Umi); 169. "Declaration" (宣言, Sengen); 170. "3 Years Later"; 171. "Wander in Space"; 172. "Universe 3" (ユニバース3, Yunibāsu Surī); 173. "Feather Alighting" (舞い降りる羽, Maioriru Hane); 174. "Mind Getting Out of the Way?" (そこ､どいてくれ, Soko, Doitekure); 175. "The Man, the Captain" (その男､キャプテン, Sono Otoko, Kyaputen); 176. "The Planet Dahlia" (惑星ダリア, Wakusei Daria)
Recovering from Witch's death, Shiki postpones Edens Zero's voyage for Mother to focus on defeating Ziggy. The crew spends the next three years freeing numerous planets in the Kaede Cosmos from Ziggy's influence while searching for him. Alarmed by Shiki's vigilantism and growing strength, the government brands him as one of the Oración Seis Galáctica. Rebecca learns from Noah that her Cat Leaper has been sending her to parallel universes when the crew encounters an alternate version of Connor who is on the run from Ziggy, revealing Ziggy's base of operations to be on the industrial planet Lendard. The crew ferries Connor to Blue Garden to send him into hiding, but when they are ambushed by the Interstellar Union Army, Connor returns and helps them avoid capture by the Oración Seis Interstellar member Feather. While resting at the planet Dahlia, the crew is approached by Feather's teammate Holy, who proposes an alliance with Shiki.
| 21 | Operation Planet Eater; Hoshigami Sakusen (星咬作戦) | June 17, 2022; 978-4-06-528179-6 | February 28, 2023; 978-1-64-651690-2 |
177. "Holy Judgment" (聖なる裁き, Sei naru Sabaki); 178. "Rebecca and Labilia" (レベッカとラビリア, Rebekka to Rabiria); 179. "Deadend Crow" (デッドエンド・クロウ, Deddoendo Kurō); 180. "Operation Planet Eater" (星咬作戦, Hoshigami Sakusen); 181. "Prelude to the Kaede War" (楓大戦の序曲, Kaede Taisen no Jokyoku); 182. "Warrior Maid 95" (戦乙女九五式, Ikusa Otome Kyūjūgo-shiki) (Note: The kanji 九五, glossed in furigana as Kyūjūgo (キュウジュウゴ; "ninety-five"), are normally read separately as kyū ("nine") and go ("five"), respectively.); 183. "Le Lendard" (ル = レンダード, Ru Rendādo); 184. "Elsie vs. Ziggy" (エルシー vs. ジギー, Erushī vs. Jigī); 185. "Corroded Arena" (侵食の闘技場, Shinshoku no Tōgijō)
Shiki accepts Holy as a temporary crew member after she informs him of Ziggy's alliance with her enemy Deadend Crow, one of the Oración Seis Galáctica. Rebecca also rekindles her friendship with Labilia, who is brought aboard Edens Zero as a patient after revealing herself to have an incurable illness. Partnered with Elsie, Edens Zero plans to eliminate Ziggy and Crow by using Rebecca's time-distorting power to lure the Chronophage to Lendard, which is guarded by a dragon swarm controlled by God Acnoella, another Galáctica member aligned with Ziggy. Elsie bypasses the dragons and nearly defeats Ziggy, but is distracted when he briefly returns to his original self, leading Justice to save Elsie before Ziggy can kill her. Meanwhile, Shiki's team faces the Demon King's Four Dark Stars, Edens One's enhanced counterparts to the Four Shining Stars.
| 22 | The Ether of All Things; Banbutsu no Ēteru (万物のエーテル) | August 17, 2022; 978-4-06-528658-6 | April 25, 2023; 978-16-4-651691-9 |
186. "The Subdimension Program" (亜空間プログラム, Akūkan Puroguramu); 187. "Shiki vs. Wizard" (シキ vs. ウィザード, Shiki vs. Wizādo); 188. "One Tenth" (1割, Ichiwari); 189. "Rebecca vs. Clown" (レベッカ vs. クラウン, Rebekka vs. Kuraun); 190. "The Greatest Show from Hell" (地獄のサーカス, Jigoku no Sākasu); 191. "Zombie Nurses" (ゾンビナース, Zonbi Nāsu); 192. "Weisz vs. Killer" (ワイズ vs. キラー, Waizu vs. Kirā); 193. "A Good Boy" (やさしい子, Yasashii Ko); 194. "The Ether of All Things" (万物のエーテル, Banbutsu no Ēteru)
While the rest of the Edens Zero crew and Holy battle Crow, with whom Holy has a personal vendetta, the Four Dark Stars separate Shiki's team across digital dimensions to fight them individually. Shiki defeats Wizard, Witch's Dark Star counterpart, but Rebecca and Weisz are defeated by Clown and Killer – Sister and Hermit's counterparts, respectively – while Homura struggles against Brigandine, Valkyrie's counterpart. Throughout the battle, Shiki's gravity draws the Dark Stars' lost memories into his mind, leading him to discover that they were once closely acquainted with their Shining Star counterparts. Afterwards, Clown and Killer infiltrate Edens Zero to eliminate Sister and Hermit.
| 23 | Alternative | October 17, 2022; 978-4-06-529414-7 | June 27, 2023 (digital); July 4, 2023 (print); 978-16-4-651692-6 |
195. "Fictitious Story" (偽りのストリー, Itsuwari no Sutorī); 196. "The Four Shining Stars Extinguished" (四煌星全滅, Shikōsei Zenmetsu); 197. "Confidence" (自信, Jishin); 198. "Nightmare" (悪夢, Akumu); 199. "Saintfire Nox" (セントファイア・ノックス, Sentofaia Nokkusu); 200. "Alternative"; 201. "Melt" (メルト, Meruto); 202. "Unmasked" (素顔, Sugao); 203. "Ziggy" (ジギー, Jigī)
Hermit and Homura destroy Killer and Brigandine, while Sister captures Clown and prevents him from stealing Etherion, Edens Zero's secret weapon. As the rest of the crew assists Holy when she becomes trapped inside Crow's body, Shiki's team reaches the center of Lendard, where Ziggy has gathered the bodies of countless human mothers in a plan to locate Mother through their Ether; the only living captive is Saintfire Nox, one of the Oración Seis Galáctica, who is revealed to be Rebecca's long-lost mother. Beginning their final battle, Shiki destroys Ziggy's mask and discovers him to be an alternate version of himself from 20,000 years in the future.
| 24 | Point Zero; Genten Zero (原点0) | December 16, 2022; 978-4-06-529939-5 | August 29, 2023; 978-16-4-651887-6 |
204. "Point Zero" (原点0, Genten Zero); 205. "3173"; 206. "Traitor" (裏切り者, Uragirimono); 207. "To Shine" (輝く為に, Kagayaku Tame ni); 208. "Dead End" (デッドエンド, Deddo Endo); 209. "Renewed Time" (動き出した時間, Ugokidashita Jikan); 210. "The True Enemy" (真の敵, Shin no Teki); 211. "Tragedy" (惨劇, Sangeki); 212. "Möbius" (メビウス, Mebiusu)
Ziggy reveals the origins of himself and Edens Zero, which was built for him to return to the present using the power of Etherion taken from the future Rebecca's body. Pino notices that Ziggy has secretly unlocked her ability to Overdrive, which she uses to restore his original, kind personality. Ziggy explains that he has been controlled by a greater evil presently on Lendard, but is unable to reveal the enemy's identity, and requests Shiki to kill him before he can lose control of himself again. Meanwhile, Holy discovers Crow's power source and creator to be her teammate Cure, whom she helps Edens Zero eradicate along with Crow. Elsewhere, Elsie prepares to seize the source of Ziggy and Acnoella's robotic armies after destroying Acnoella, her mother, in a rage.
| 25 | The Final World; Saigo no Sekai (最後の世界) | February 17, 2023; 978-4-06-530529-4 | October 31, 2023; 978-16-4-651888-3 |
213. "If We Don't Have to Fight..." (戦わずに済むのなら, Tatakawazu ni Sumu no Nara); 214. "As One..." (一つに…, Hitotsu ni...); 215. "From the Depths of the Earth" (地の底より出る, Chi no Soko yori Izuru); 216. "Within the Fading Years" (失われた時の中で, Ushinawareta Toki no Naka de); 217. "Father, Mother, and Daughter" (父と母と娘, Chichi to Haha to Musume); 218. "Saintfire" (セントファイア, Sentofaia); 219. "The Final World" (最後の世界, Saigo no Sekai); 220. "Etherion" (エーテリオン, Ēterion); 221. "Back in the Sky Where Cherry Blossoms Dance" (桜舞うソラの頃に, Sakura Mau Sora no Koro ni)
Elsie deactivates Acnoella's dragons, while Ziggy provokes Shiki into destroying him by pretending to be controlled again by the true enemy, revealed to be Edens One, which is artificially intelligent. The Edens Zero crew escapes with their mothers' bodies before the Chronophage consumes Lendard along with Elsie and Justice, who willingly remain behind after losing their will to fight. Rebecca discovers Connor to be her father, and reunites with her mother, Rachel. Rachel explains that Mother is dying, which will result in humankind's extinction, and can only be saved in Universe Zero, the convergence point of all parallel worlds, where she warns that further time travel will be impossible. The crew uses Etherion to enter Universe Zero, where they relive their entire lives without any knowledge of the future. When Shiki meets Rebecca and Happy on Granbell, the three regain their memories of the previous world and happily reunite.
| 26 | A Happy World; Shiawase na Sekai (幸せな世界) | April 17, 2023; 978-4-06-531238-4 | December 26, 2023; 978-16-4-651889-0 |
222. "A Happy World" (幸せな世界, Shiawase na Sekai); 223. "Memories and Abilities" (記憶と能力, Kioku to Nōryoku); 224. "The Planet Guilst (Universe Zero)" (惑星ギルスト(U0(ユニバースゼロ)), Wakusei Girusuto (Yunibāsu Zero)); 225. "Moscoy Heaven" (モスコイ天国(ヘブン), Mosukoi Hebun) (Note: The kanji 天国, glossed with furigana as Hebun (ヘブン), are normally read as "Tengoku" ("heaven").); 226. "Sea God" (海神, Kaishin); 227. "Power and Strength" (力と体, Chikara to Karada); 228. "Gunner" (ガンナー, Gannā); 229. "Sniper" (狙撃者, Shogekisha); 230. "The Shape of Ether" (エーテルの形, Ēteru no Katachi)
Shiki, Rebecca, and Happy find their lives in Universe Zero altered for the better, with Ziggy having prevented the Granbell robots' deaths and left Edens Zero on Granbell for Shiki. Joined by a past version of Witch, they revisit old planets to restore their crewmates' memories, culminating in another battle with Drakken Joe's forces on Guilst. In the process, several other drastic changes to history are revealed, including Homura's indebtedness to Drakken, Poseidon Nero's replacement of Laguna in the Element 4, and Shura's succession as emperor of the Aoi Cosmos. Nero guides Shiki on how to access his future strength, which he achieves by entering a new form of Overdrive that resembles Ziggy. When Nero explains his intention for Shiki to stop Shura, Shiki decides to befriend Shura and Drakken.
| 27 | Crimson Tears; Kurenai no Namida (紅の涙) | July 14, 2023; 978-4-06-531893-5 | February 20, 2024; 979-88-8-877032-0 |
231. "What Makes a Hero" (英雄の条件, Eiyū no Jōken); 232. "Sun Jewel (Universe Zero)" (サンジュエル(U0(ユニバースゼロ)), San Jueru (Yunibāsu Zero)); 233. "Sword Flash" (剣閃, Kensen); 234. "Crimson Tears" (紅の涙, Kurenai no Namida); 235. "Over Nu Etherion" (オーバーνエーテリオン, Ōbā Nyū Ēterion); 236. "1 + 4 + 6"; 237. "The Lost Planet" (消えた惑星, Kieta Wakusei); 238. "Encounter on the Sands" (砂上の邂逅, Sajō no Kaikō); 239. "It's Him!!" (Note: Stylized as "It's HIM!!".) (出た!!, Deta!!)
Shiki persuades the more humane Drakken to evacuate Guilst's population before the Chronophage's arrival. Homura regains her memories after reuniting with a living Valkyrie and reconciling with a heroic version of Madame Kurenai on Sun Jewel. The crew learns from Pino's restored memories that Edens One has built an android vessel for itself named Over Nu Etherion Void, and is served by a revised Oración Seis Galáctica that includes Xenolith, who is blamed for destroying Foresta. The crew reunites with Laguna on Sandra, where he opposes Shura and Xenolith as Oasis' leader, while Shura leads a manhunt for Xenolith, whom he accuses Oasis of sheltering. Xenolith suddenly appears in the body of a local girl's robot companion, revealing that he was stripped of his gravity powers and framed by Müller.
| 28 | Like the Deep Blue Sea; Fukaki Umi no Gotoku (深き海の如く) | September 14, 2023; 978-4-06-532890-3 | April 30, 2024; 979-88-8-877033-7 |
240. "The Doctor's Deviant Disposition" (博士の異常な感情, Hakase no Ijōna Kanjō); 241. "Flight of the Valkyrie" (ヴァルキリー出撃, Varukirī Shutsugeki); 242. "Müller's Trap" (ミュラーの罠, Myurā no Wana); 243. "Where Did That Cat Come From?" (その猫はどこから来たのか, Sono Neko wa Doko kara Kita no ka); 244. "Iron Rain" (鉄の雨, Tetsu no Ame); 245. "Like the Deep Blue Sea" (深き海の如く, Fukaki Umi no Gotoku); 246. "Reina and Hamrio" (レイナとハムリオ, Reina to Hamurio); 247. "To the Field of Battle" (戦いの舞台へ, Tatakai no Butai e); 248. "The Yukino Cosmos" (雪宇宙(ユキノコスモス), Yukino Kosumosu) (Note: The kanji 雪宇宙, glossed with furigana as Yukino Kosumosu (ユキノコスモス), are normally read as Yuki Uchū ("snow cosmos").)
Shiki and Shura join forces against Müller, who has fused himself with a robotic copy of Xenolith. Müller kidnaps Rebecca in a bid to harness her time powers, but Shiki and Shura thwart him with the help of the Oración Seis Interstellar, who have learned of the previous world's existence from Rachel, one of the army's directors in Universe Zero. After a celebratory gala, the Edens Zero crew meets with Rachel and the other directors – Noah, Nadia, and Elsie – who enlist the crew's aid in stopping Edens One. The crew travels to the Yukino Cosmos, bringing the Mother Ether they have retained from the previous world to obtain a waymark to Mother on Rachel's homeworld of Miltz. During the process, a masked intruder stops time for everyone except Rebecca.
| 29 | From Eternity Long Past; Yūkyū no Toki yori (悠久の時より) | November 16, 2023; 978-4-06-532890-3 | June 25, 2024; 979-88-8-877034-4 |
249. "Within the Stillness of Time" (静かなる時の中で, Shizuka naru Toki no Naka de); 250. "Joker" (ジョーカー, Jōkā); 251. "Escape from Planet Miltz" (惑星ミルツ脱出編, Wakusei Mirutsu Dasshutsu-hen); 252. "Game Start"; 253. "Stage 1"; 254. "Stage 2"; 255. "An Unexplored Cosmos" (未開の宇宙, Mikai no Uchū); 256. "From Eternity Long Past" (悠久の時より, Yūkyū no Toki yori); 257. "Leonard" (レナード, Renādo)
Escaping the field of frozen time, Rebecca is aided by the elderly Professor Weisz against the intruder, the Oración Seis Galáctica member Joker Helix. Once an AI-powered game engine developed by Professor Weisz for Rebecca as a child, Joker traps Rebecca in a series of video game-like dimensions to play with her while attempting to steal the Mother Ether. With Shiki and the professor's help, Rebecca overcomes Joker's games and convinces her to surrender peacefully. Before leaving, Professor Weisz gives Pino a flash drive containing her deleted memories about the Four Shining Stars' creation. Edens Zero follows the waymark into uncharted space, where they are followed and attacked by God Acnoella and the Four Dark Stars. Meanwhile, Pino short-circuits after installing her memories and learning that human versions of the Shining Stars and Dark Stars have lived 20,000 years ago on a dying, modern-day Earth.
| 30 | Just Beyond This Point... Tadori Tsuita Saki ni wa... (辿り着いた先には…) | January 17, 2024; 978-4-06-534178-0 | November 26, 2024; 979-88-8-877310-9 |
258. "The Shape of a Planet" (星の形, Hoshi no Katachi); 259. "Storming the Edens One!!" (エデンズ ワン突入!!, Edenzu Wan Totsunyū!!); 260. "Cosmo" (コスモ, Kosumo); 261. "Life/Death" (生 / 死, Sei/Shi); 262. "Just One More Time"; 263. "Luna" (ルナ, Runa); 264. "Override" (オーバーライド, Ōbāraido); 265. "Just Beyond This Point" (辿り着いた先には…, Tadori Tsuita Saki ni wa...); 266. "Soldier of Love" (愛の戦士, Ai no Senshi)
Killer uploads a self-destruct program into Edens Zero's computer systems. Hermit works to resolve the issue by overriding the ship's systems with the other Shining Stars' authorization. However, the crew is preoccupied by Edens One's forces, with Mosco defeating Clown by changing into Cosmo, his overly dominant alter ego triggered by his forbidden button. Meanwhile, Shiki infiltrates Edens One to confront Void, but is killed by Lightning Law, one of Void's Oración Seis Galáctica. Discovering she can still reverse time in Universe Zero by becoming naked, Rebecca averts Shiki's death and contacts Laguna, who enters Overdrive and defeats Law. Shiki and Rebecca pursue Void as he approaches Mother to kill her. When Shiki fails to defeat Void, Ziggy returns alive to battle Void himself.
| 31 | Mother... Haha naru... (母なる…) | March 15, 2024; 978-4-06-534866-6 | April 29, 2025; 979-88-8-877445-8 |
267. "Mother and Child" (母と子, Haha to Ko); 268. "Ziggy vs. Void" (ジギー vs. ヴォイド, Jigī vs. Voido); 269. "Dance of Swords" (剣の舞, Tsurugi no Mai); 270. "The Hermit Special" (ハーミットスペシャル, Hāmitto Supesharu); 271. "Their Lives or the Future?" (命か未来か, Inochi ka Mirai ka); 272. "Mother..." (母なる…, Haha naru...); 273. "Purification" (自浄, Jijō); 274. "Earth's Destruction" (地球崩壊, Chikyū Hōkai); 275. "Birth of the Four Shining Stars" (四煌星誕生, Shikōsei Tanjō)
Witch, Valkyrie, Homura, and Weisz defeat the remaining Dark Stars and Acnoella, preventing Edens Zero's self-destruction. Ziggy sends Shiki to save Mother while he distracts Void, whom Ziggy recognizes as his and Rebecca's son from the future. Shiki's group finally reaches Mother, who offers Shiki a choice between saving her, which would cause all those who died in previous universes to die in Universe Zero, or preventing these deaths while guaranteeing Mother's death. To aid his decision, Mother reveals herself to be the transformed state of planet Earth, which the Shining Stars' and Dark Stars' human models—including Shiki's parents, the models for Witch and Wizard—sent into Overdrive to save the planet from destruction at the cost of their lives 20,000 years ago. She further explains that she had been temporarily reverted to her planetary form by the Chronophage fifteen years earlier, an event that led Ziggy to rescue the infant Shiki before Mother's rebirth.
| 32 | In the Belly of Time; Toki no Naka (時の体内(なか) (Note: The kanji 体内, glossed with furigana as naka (なか; "inside"), are normally read as Tainai ("interior of the body").)) | June 17, 2024; 978-4-06-535505-3 | July 29, 2025; 979-88-8-877446-5 |
276. "Shiki's Choice" (シキの決断, Shiki no Ketsudan); 277. "Fading Mother" (消えゆくマザー, Kieyuku Mazā); 278. "B-Cubers" (B・キューバー, Bī Kyūbā); 279. "Super Ziggy" (スーパージギー, Sūpā Jigī); 280. "Spear of the Wind" (風の槍, Kaze no Yari); 281. "Lady Freyja" (レディ・フレイヤ, Redi Fureiya); 282. "Homura, the Flame" (焔, Homura); 283. "In the Belly of Time (時の体内(なか), Toki no Naka); 284. "Xenoflare" (ゼノフレア, Zenofurea)
Shiki chooses to let Mother disappear to preserve his friends' lives, but intends to save her by having the Chronophage revert her back into Earth and preventing its destruction before she completely vanishes. The Edens Zero crew lures the Chronophage by transmitting their time-displaced Ether across B-Cube, restoring Labilia and Couchpo's memories to assist them. The crew is hindered by Cure and Lady Freyja, the last remaining members of the Oración Seis Galáctica, who are defeated by Jinn and Homura, respectively. To hasten the process, Shiki enlists the help of Xiaomei, who reveals her own identity as Earth's Moon. Xiaomei uses her powers to send Shiki directly into the Chronophage's path, where he enters the creature's stomach and encounters its true form: a masked female figure who demands the return of her stolen "time". Meanwhile, Ziggy enters Overdrive and severs Void's legs, ridding Void of his time powers inherited from Rebecca.
| 33 | Friends; Tomodachi (友達) | August 16, 2024; 978-4-06-536511-3 | September 30, 2025; 979-88-8-877485-4 |
285. "Zero vs. One" (0対1, Zero Tai Wan); 286. "Chrono Children" (時の子, Toki no Ko); 287. "10^{72} Joules" (Note: "10^{72}J" in the original Japanese release.); 288. "If We Could Be Friends" (友達になれたら, Tomodachi ni Naretara); 289. "Re-Creation" (再生, Saisei); 290. "The Girl Who Ate Through Time" (時を食べる少女, Toki o Taberu Shōjo); 291. "My Role" (私の役目, Watashi no Yakume); 292. "Friendship Never Ends" (友達は終わらない, Tomodachi wa Owaranai); 293. "Friends" (友達, Tomodachi)
Edens Zero's allies arrive and wipe out Void's armada after being contacted by Labilia, allowing Ziggy and Edens Zero to destroy Void and Edens One. Meanwhile, the Chronophage prepares to annihilate the universe with a Big Bang, but Shiki absorbs the attack's energy with his gravity, strengthening him enough to force the Chronophage into eating Mother, which restores Earth. The Chronophage resumes her attack after finding her "time" within Rebecca and possessing her, revealing the monster to be Rebecca's amnesiac future self from Ziggy's timeline, who escaped her comatose body to follow Ziggy into the past. When Shiki desperately reminds the future Rebecca of their friendship, she regains her memories and peacefully fades away, releasing the present Rebecca. Pino deems her own role complete and quietly deactivates, while the Four Shining Stars supply their human selves with technology to help them properly revitalize Earth. Years later, the crew gathers on Granbell for the birth of Shiki and Rebecca's daughter. In limbo, Mother offers Pino a chance to be reincarnated as this child to fulfill her dream of becoming human, but Pino instead chooses to be reactivated as an android and reunites with her friends.
