= List of Edens Zero episodes =

Key visual of the series

Edens Zero is a Japanese anime television series based on the manga series of the same name, written and illustrated by Hiro Mashima. The anime television adaptation by J.C.Staff was first announced by Mashima on Twitter on June 12, 2020. Shinji Ishihira serves as chief director, with Mitsutaka Hirota overseeing scripts, Yurika Sako designing the characters, and Yoshihisa Hirano composing the music. The story follows Shiki Granbell, a boy with gravity powers who inherits the titular spaceship from his adoptive grandfather, the mechanical "Demon King" Ziggy, which he and his crew use to explore the universe in search of Mother, the goddess of the cosmos.

The first season aired on Nippon TV and other channels from April 11 to October 3, 2021, (Note: The series premiered on April 10, 2021 at 24:55 (effectively, April 11 at 12:55 a.m. JST).) and was directed by Yūji Suzuki until his death on September 9, 2021. The second season aired from April 2 to October 1, 2023, (Note: The season premiered on April 1, 2023 at 24:55 (effectively, April 2 at 12:55 a.m. JST).) with Toshinori Watanabe replacing Suzuki as director.

Netflix acquired streaming rights for the first season, globally releasing the first twelve episodes outside Japan on August 26, 2021, and the remaining thirteen episodes on November 24 the same year. The second season was licensed internationally by Mediatoon Distribution, and streamed in various regions by Crunchyroll.

== Series overview ==
Season	Episodes	Originally released	
Season	Episodes	First released	Last released
1	25	April 11, 2021	October 3, 2021
2	25	April 2, 2023	October 1, 2023

== Episodes ==
=== Season 1 (2021) ===
No. overall	No. in season	Title (Note: All English titles are taken from Netflix.)	Directed by	Written by	Storyboarded by	Original release date
1	1	"Into the Sky Where Cherry Blossoms Flutter"; Transliteration: "Sakura Mau Sora ni" (Japanese: 桜舞うソラに)	Katsushi Sakurabi	Mitsutaka Hirota	Shinji Ishihira	April 11, 2021 (Note: Episodes 1 and 2 were pre-screened on March 29, 2021.)
2	2	"A Girl and Her Blue Cat"; Transliteration: "Shōjo to Ao Neko" (Japanese: 少女と青猫)	Yoshihiro Mori	Mitsutaka Hirota	Yūji Suzuki	April 18, 2021
3	3	"Adventurers"; Transliteration: "Bōkensha-tachi" (Japanese: 冒険者たち)	Tsuneo Tominaga	Mitsutaka Hirota	Toshinori Watanabe	April 25, 2021
4	4	"A Man Named Weisz"; Transliteration: "Waizu to Iu Otoko" (Japanese: ワイズという男)	Kazuma Satō	Mitsutaka Hirota	Shinji Ishihira	May 2, 2021
5	5	"Clash!! The Sibir Family"; Transliteration: "Gekitotsu!! Shibiru Famirī" (Japanese: 激突!!シビルファミリー)	Katsushi Sakurabi	Mitsutaka Hirota	Yūji Suzuki	May 9, 2021
6	6	"The Skull Fairy"; Transliteration: "Sukaru Fearī-gō" (Japanese: スカルフェアリー号)	Tsuneo Tominaga	Mitsutaka Hirota	Toshinori Watanabe	May 16, 2021
7	7	"Warship of the Demon King"; Transliteration: "Maō Senkan" (Japanese: 魔王戦艦)	Yoshihiro Mori	Mitsutaka Hirota	Shinji Ishihira	May 23, 2021
8	8	"Wind Howls on the Highway"; Transliteration: "Kaze no Naku Haiwei" (Japanese: 風の鳴くハイウェイ)	Kazuma Satō	Mitsutaka Hirota	Yūji Suzuki	May 30, 2021
9	9	"Planet Guilst"; Transliteration: "Wakusei Girusuto" (Japanese: 惑星ギルスト)	Kiyoshi Murayama	Mitsutaka Hirota	Toshinori Watanabe	June 6, 2021 (Note: This episode aired at 1:00 a.m. JST, 5 minutes after the original air time on Nippon TV.)
10	10	"The Great Naked Escape"; Transliteration: "Hadaka no Dasshutsu Sakusen" (Japanese: 裸の脱出作戦)	Yoshiaki Iwasaki	Mitsutaka Hirota	Shinji Ishihira	June 13, 2021
11	11	"Sister Ivry"; Transliteration: "Shisutā Ivurii" (Japanese: シスター・イヴリィ)	Yoshihiro Mori	Megumu Sasano	Shinji Ishihira	June 20, 2021
12	12	"New Friends"; Transliteration: "Arata na Nakama-tachi" (Japanese: 新たな仲間たち)	Hiroaki Takagi	Mitsutaka Hirota	Toshinori Watanabe	June 27, 2021 (Note: This episode aired at 1:10 a.m. JST, 15 minutes after the original air time on Nippon TV.)
13	13	"The Super Virtual Planet"; Transliteration: "Chōkasō Wakusei" (Japanese: 超仮想惑星)	Katsushi Sakurabi	Mitsutaka Hirota	Yūji Suzuki	July 4, 2021 (Note: This episode aired at 1:05 a.m. JST, 10 minutes after the original air time on Nippon TV.)
14	14	"The Girl on the Hill"; Transliteration: "Oka no Ue no Shōjo" (Japanese: 丘の上の少女)	Kiyotaka Ōhata	Megumu Sasano	Kiyotaka Ōhata	July 11, 2021
15	15	"Great Kaiju Shiki"; Transliteration: "Daikaijū Shiki" (Japanese: 大怪獣シキ)	Yoshihiro Mori	Mitsutaka Hirota	Toshinori Watanabe	July 18, 2021 (Note: This episode aired at 1:35 a.m. JST, 40 minutes after the original air time on Nippon TV.)
16	16	"Fireworks"; Transliteration: "Hanabi" (Japanese: 花火)	Kazuma Satō	Mitsutaka Hirota	Shinji Ishihira	July 25, 2021
17	17	"The Temple of Knowledge"; Transliteration: "Chishiki no Kyūden" (Japanese: 知識の宮殿)	Yoshiyuki Nogami	Megumu Sasano	Kiyoko Sayama	August 1, 2021
18	18	"Words Will Give You Strength"; Transliteration: "Kotoba wa Tsuyosa o Ataeru" (Japanese: 言葉は強さを与える)	Tsuneo Tominaga	Mitsutaka Hirota	Toshinori Watanabe	August 8, 2021 (Note: This episode aired at 2:00 a.m. JST, an hour and 5 minutes after the original air time on Nippon TV.)
19	19	"From the Planet of Eternity"; Transliteration: "Eiei Mukyū no Hoshi yori" (Japanese: 永永無窮の星より)	Yoshiaki Iwasaki	Mitsutaka Hirota	Shinji Ishihira	August 15, 2021
20	20	"Stones"; Transliteration: "Sutōnzu" (Japanese: 鉱石生命体(ストーンズ))	Yoshihiro Mori	Megumu Sasano	Yūji Suzuki	August 29, 2021
21	21	"Reset"; Transliteration: "Risetto" (Japanese: リセット)	Kiyoshi Murayama	Mitsutaka Hirota	Toshinori Watanabe	September 5, 2021
22	22	"My Mother, the Machine"; Transliteration: "Kikai no Haha" (Japanese: 機械の母)	Kazuma Satō	Mitsutaka Hirota	Shinji Ishihira	September 12, 2021
23	23	"Until the Day It Turns to Strength"; Transliteration: "Itsuka Tsuyosa ni Kawaru Made" (Japanese: いつか強さに変わるまで)	Yūji Suzuki, Yūsuke Onoda	Megumu Sasano	Toshinori Watanabe	September 19, 2021
24	24	"Taking Up the Torch"; Transliteration: "Ishi o Tsugu Mono" (Japanese: 意志を継ぐ者)	Yūji Suzuki	Megumu Sasano	Yūji Suzuki	September 26, 2021
25	25	"Someone to Love"; Transliteration: "Aisuru Mono" (Japanese: 愛する者)	Yūji Suzuki, Yoshiyuki Nogami	Mitsutaka Hirota	Yūji Suzuki, Shinji Ishihira	October 3, 2021

=== Season 2 (2023) ===
No. overall	No. in season	Title (Note: All English titles are taken from Crunchyroll.)	Directed by	Written by	Storyboarded by	Original release date (Note: The season premiered on April 1, 2023 at 24:55 (effectively, April 2 at 12:55 a.m. JST).)
26	1	"Belial Gore"; Transliteration: "Beriaru Goa" (Japanese: ベリアル・ゴア)	Yoshiyuki Nogami	Mitsutaka Hirota	Shinji Ishihira	April 2, 2023
27	2	"Element 4"; Transliteration: "Eremento Fō" (Japanese: エレメント4)	Hidehiko Kadota	Mitsutaka Hirota	Takeshi Mori	April 9, 2023
28	3	"A Wind Blows Through the Sakura Cosmos"; Transliteration: "Sakura Kosumosu ni Fuku Kaze" (Japanese: 桜宇宙(サクラコスモス)に吹く風)	Toshinori Watanabe	Mitsutaka Hirota	Toshinori Watanabe	April 16, 2023
29	4	"No. 29"; Transliteration: "Nijūkyū-gō" (Japanese: 29号)	Yoshiyuki Kumeda, Kōichirō Kuroda	Megumu Sasano	Takeshi Mori	April 23, 2023
30	5	"Intercession"; Transliteration: "Chūsai" (Japanese: 仲裁)	Shigeru Ueda	Mitsutaka Hirota	Shinji Ishihira	April 30, 2023
31	6	"Our Future"; Transliteration: "Ore-tachi no Mirai" (Japanese: オレたちの未来)	Yoshiyuki Nogami	Mitsutaka Hirota	Shinji Ishihira	May 7, 2023
32	7	"4 VS 4"	Hidehiko Kadota	Megumu Sasano	Takeshi Mori	May 14, 2023
33	8	"The Sword of Edens"; Transliteration: "Edenzu no Tsurugi" (Japanese: エデンズの剣)	Yoshihiro Mori	Mitsutaka Hirota	Takeshi Mori	May 21, 2023
34	9	"Shiki vs. Drakken"; Transliteration: "Shiki bāsasu Dorakken" (Japanese: シキ vs ドラッケン)	Yoshiyuki Kumeda, Kōichirō Kuroda	Mitsutaka Hirota	Takeshi Mori	May 28, 2023
35	10	"Advent of the Demon King"; Transliteration: "Maō Kōrin" (Japanese: 魔王降臨)	Toshinori Watanabe	Megumu Sasano	Toshinori Watanabe	June 4, 2023
36	11	"Edens One"	Yūsuke Onada	Mitsutaka Hirota	Shinji Ishihira	June 11, 2023
37	12	"Clash of the Cosmos"; Transliteration: "Gekitō no Sora" (Japanese: 激闘の宇宙(ソラ))	Yoshiyuki Nogami, Momo Shimizu	Mitsutaka Hirota	Shinji Ishihira	June 18, 2023
38	13	"The Woman They Called Pirate"; Transliteration: "Kaizoku to Yobare Onna" (Japanese: 海賊と呼ばれ女)	Yoshihiro Mori	Mitsutaka Hirota	Takeshi Mori	June 25, 2023
39	14	"Nadia, Love of My Life"; Transliteration: "Waga Saiai no Nadia" (Japanese: 我が最愛のナディア)	Yoshihiro Mori	Mitsutaka Hirota	Takeshi Mori	July 2, 2023
40	15	"A Robot in Love"; Transliteration: "Koisuru Kikai" (Japanese: 恋する機械)	Toshinori Watanabe	Megumu Sasano	Toshinori Watanabe	July 9, 2023
41	16	"In the Doghouse"; Transliteration: "Inu ni Naru" (Japanese: 犬になる)	Yūsuke Onoda	Mitsutaka Hirota	Toshinori Watanabe	July 16, 2023
42	17	"The Battle of Foresta"; Transliteration: "Foresuta no Tatakai" (Japanese: フォレスタの戦い)	Yoshiyuki Nogami, Momo Shimizu	Mitsutaka Hirota	Takeshi Mori	July 23, 2023
43	18	"Star Drain"; Transliteration: "Sutā Dorein" (Japanese: スタードレイン)	Yoshihiro Mori	Megumi Sasano	Takeshi Mori	July 30, 2023
44	19	"Darling Little Piece of Junk"; Transliteration: "Itoshii Garakuta-chan" (Japanese: 愛しいガラクタちゃん)	Shigeru Ueda	Mitsutaka Hirota	Shinji Ishihira	August 6, 2023
45	20	"Kiss & Die"	Toshinori Watanabe	Megumu Sasano	Shinji Ishihira	August 13, 2023
46	21	"The Doomsday System"; Transliteration: "Shūmetsu Shisutemu" (Japanese: 終末システム)	Yoshihiro Mori	Mitsutaka Hirota	Shinji Ishihira	August 20, 2023
47	22	"Oceans 6"; Transliteration: "Ōshanzu Shikkusu" (Japanese: オーシャンズ6)	Shigeru Ueda	Mitsutaka Hirota	Takeshi Mori	September 3, 2023
48	23	"Judgment Day"; Transliteration: "Jajjimento Dei" (Japanese: ジャッジメント・デイ)	Yoshiyuki Nogami, Momo Shimizu	Mitsutaka Hirota	Yoshiyuki Nogami	September 10, 2023
49	24	"Desert Oasis"; Transliteration: "Sabaku no Oashisu" (Japanese: 砂漠のオアシス)	Toshinori Watanabe	Megumu Sasano	Toshinori Watanabe	September 17, 2023
50	25	"Prelude to the Aoi War"; Transliteration: "Aoi Taisen no Jokyoku" (Japanese: 葵大戦の序曲)	Toshinori Watanabe	Mitsutaka Hirota	Shinji Ishihira	October 1, 2023

== Compilation film ==
No.	Title	Original release date (Note: The video streamed on April 1, 2023 at 24:55 (effectively, April 2 at 12:55 a.m. JST).)
1	"Edens Zero Season 1 Recap Movie"; Transliteration: "Edenzu Zero: Dai-Ikki (Sōshūhen)" (Japanese: 「EDENS ZERO」第1期【総集編】)	April 2, 2023
A 72-minute recap compilation of events from the first season, narrated by Shiki and Pino.

== Home media release ==
Region 2 — Japan
Vol.	Episodes	Cover character(s)	Release date	Ref.
Season 1
1	1–3	Shiki Granbell	August 4, 2021	
2	4–6	Rebecca Bluegarden & Happy	September 8, 2021	
3	7–9	Weisz Steiner & E.M. Pino	October 6, 2021	
4	10–12	Homura Kōgetsu	November 3, 2021	
5	13–16	Witch Regret	December 1, 2021	
6	17–19	Sister Ivry & Mosco Versa-0	January 12, 2022	
7	20–22	Hermit Mio	February 2, 2022	
8	23–25	Valkyrie Yuna	March 2, 2022	
Season 2
1	26–38	Shiki Granbell, Rebecca Bluegarden, Four Shining Stars, Drakken Joe & Element 4	November 22, 2023	
2	39–50	Shiki Granbell, Rebecca Bluegarden, Happy, Weisz Steiner, E.M. Pino, Homura Kōgetsu, Ziggy, Elsie Crimson & Justice	December 27, 2023	
