= Happy (manga character) =

Fictional character from Fairy Tail and Edens Zero

- Fairy Tail and Edens Zero character
- Happy as drawn by Hiro Mashima in Fairy Tail
- First appearance: Fairy Tail chapter 1: The Fairy's Tail (2006)
- Created by: Hiro Mashima
- Voiced by: Japanese Rie Kugimiya; English Tia Ballard

In-universe information
- Species: Exceed
- Gender: Male
- Occupation: Wizard
- Family: Lucky (father); Marl (mother)
- Guild: Fairy Tail
- Magic: Aera

Happy (Japanese: ハッピー, Hepburn: Happī) is a fictional character who appears in the manga series Fairy Tail and Edens Zero created by Hiro Mashima. He is depicted throughout his appearances as an anthropomorphic blue cat who accompanies the main protagonists on their adventures, often providing comic relief. In Fairy Tail, Happy is a member of the magical Exceed race who possesses the ability to transform into a winged cat with white, feathered wings and serves as a friend and partner of Natsu Dragneel. For Edens Zero, the character is re-envisioned as an alien android and companion of the female protagonist Rebecca Bluegarden, for whom he also functions as a convertible pair of blaster weapons.

Happy has made appearances in various media related to Fairy Tail, including an anime adaptation, feature films, original video animations (OVAs), light novels, and video games. He is voiced by Rie Kugimiya in Japanese media, while Tia Ballard voices him in the English anime dub.

== Creation and conception ==
Following the completion of Rave Master, Hiro Mashima's initial idea for Happy was to create a "very chatty" mascot character that would contrast with Plue, Rave Master's mascot, whom he had difficulty with writing as Plue did not speak. In the pre-production stage of Fairy Tail, Mashima drew an illustration depicting two cat-like creatures resembling Happy with bird-like feet and feathered wings for arms. Mashima initially named the character after the Norse god Freyr, which he felt was "too much" for the character and changed to something "more suitable". When asked about the creation of his characters, Mashima replied that each character embodies a part of his own personality, with Happy representing how he acts when slacking off, later stating that Happy was based on his fondness of cats. Upon the introduction of Carla, Happy's female counterpart, Mashima's original concept for Happy, underwent "a huge change", which inspired the author to write a character arc for him shortly afterward. Mashima also mentioned that Natsu and Happy's midair battle against Cobra was "something [he] always wanted to do", commenting that it was the first time Happy had been directly involved in one of the series' battle scenes.

Regarding the anime adaptation of Fairy Tail, Mashima commented that he enjoyed seeing Natsu and Happy "move around", stating, "There's a limit to the effects I can draw regarding the depiction of the magic in the manga, so seeing that in the anime is so much fun, and it looks very beautiful onscreen. It made me realize how fun my characters are when I saw them moving around." He considers Happy to have the best portrayal in the anime out of all the manga's characters. Yohei Ito, the producer of the film Fairy Tail: Dragon Cry, described Happy as both "funny" and "really useful", as he "works in cute scenes and serious scenes." Happy is voiced by Rie Kugimiya in Japanese media and by Tia Ballard in the English dub.

While developing Edens Zero, Mashima decided to reuse Happy as a stand-in for the series' primary mascot character, E.M. Pino, who was originally intended to debut in the manga's first chapter until further development led Mashima to delay her appearance. Before settling on Happy, Mashima drew various concepts of different animal characters, which he described as a futile attempt as he felt the character was bound to become Happy. This iteration of the character has a black-tipped tail, as opposed to a white-tipped one in Fairy Tail, and wears a collar with a heart-marked "B-Cube" instead of a green satchel. Kugimiya and Ballard reprise the role in Japanese and English media, respectively.

== Appearances ==
=== In Fairy Tail ===
Fairy Tail depicts Happy as a sardonic member of the titular wizards' guild, and as a companion of the "Dragon Slayer" wizard Natsu Dragneel, with their partnership eventually expanding to include the newcomer Lucy Heartfilia and two childhood friends, Gray Fullbuster and Erza Scarlet. He is a feline creature called an Exceed that has the ability to fly by producing white, feathered wings on his back with a spell called Aera. (Note: 翼(エーラ), Ēra; Japanese text translates to "Wings") He is capable of carrying others in flight, and never triggers Natsu's motion sickness while carrying him, as Natsu does not consider him to be a mere mode of transportation. In his backstory, most of which is presented in an omake chapter, Happy is laid as an egg by the Exceed couple Lucky and Marl, which is discovered and hatched by Natsu six years before the series' narrative begins; his birth immediately quells an argument the rest of the guild have over the egg, which inspires Natsu to give Happy his name as a symbolic bluebird of happiness.

Later in the series, Happy encounters a female Exceed named Carla, who reveals that she and Happy originate from Edolas, a parallel world to the series' primary setting of Earth-land where Exceed are revered as divine beings for their innate magical power, which the other inhabitants of Edolas lack. Happy is shocked to be told that 100 unborn Exceed, including himself and Carla, were transported to Earth-land by their kind with the directive of killing Dragon Slayers such as Natsu; the two later learn that the mission is actually a cover story for an evacuation effort arranged by Queen Chagot, the Exceed's precognitive leader, following her prediction of their kingdom's destruction, with the pretense of hunting Dragon Slayers derived from her visions of future events. Happy continues to support Natsu and the guild for the duration of the series, which eventually results in Happy helping Natsu become human upon the discovery that he is an Etherious demon created by the dark wizard Zeref, and later assisting Fairy Tail and their allies' efforts to trap and eventually kill the evil dragon Acnologia within the defensive spell Fairy Sphere. By the end of Fairy Tail, Happy accompanies his team on a "century quest", a guild mission that has never been accomplished in less than 100 years.

=== In Edens Zero ===
Happy
- Edens Zero character
- First appearance: Edens Zero chapter 1: Into the Sky Where Cherry Blossoms Flutter (2018)
- Created by: Hiro Mashima
- Voiced by: Japanese Rie Kugimiya; English Tia Ballard

In-universe information
- Species: Feline alien/android
- Gender: Male
- Occupation: Adventurer; B-Cuber
- Affiliation: Edens Zero crew (member); Shooting Starlight (member); Aoneko Channel (co-host)
- Ability: Happy Blaster mode
- Homeworld: Blue Garden (home); Excede (birthplace)

Within the setting of Edens Zero, Happy is a feline alien from the planet Excede. (Note: エクシド星, Ekushido-sei) He is the lifelong friend and partner of Rebecca Bluegarden, who gives him his name upon finding him as an orphan. After Happy is run over by a drunk driver during Rebecca's childhood, the machinist Professor Weisz Steiner transfers his consciousness into an advanced android body to revive him. Happy's robotic features allow him to reconfigure himself into a pair of rayguns that Rebecca wields in battle called Happy Blasters, (Note: ハッピーブラスター, Happī Burasutā) which fire rounds of non-lethal "Ether" bullets to incapacitate targets. He demonstrates other functions as the series progresses, including an assault rifle mode, a laser blade form for his tail, and a "solo mode" cannon protrusion on his back.

Together, Happy and Rebecca manage an account called "Aoneko Channel" on the online video platform B-Cube, with the pair's goal being to obtain one million subscribers by uploading videos of different planets they visit as members of Shooting Starlight, an adventurers' guild. Shortly into the series, Happy and Rebecca join the crew of the titular warship Edens Zero, captained by Shiki Granbell, to search for the cosmic goddess Mother as a way to achieve their goal.

As with most of the cast, multiple versions of Happy appear throughout the story's multiverse setting; one version in Universe 1 is permanently separated from Rebecca and sold to a junk shop by the crime lord Drakken Joe, and another version from Universe 2 perishes in an antimatter explosion that the crew survives in Universe 3. Immediately before the final story arc, the crew activates their ship's time travel function, Etherion, which imparts their memories onto their past selves in Universe Zero, the convergence point of all universes. In this world, Happy avoids the traffic accident that leads to his mechanization, remaining flesh and blood but losing all of his previous abilities as a result.

=== In other media ===
In addition to the manga and its anime adaptation, Happy makes appearances in various other media related to Fairy Tail. In the 2012 film Fairy Tail the Movie: Phoenix Priestess, Happy joins his team in helping a priestess called Éclair reach her destination; he also makes an appearance in the one-shot prologue manga created by Hiro Mashima for the film, as well as its animated adaptation. In the 2017 film Fairy Tail: Dragon Cry, Happy and other Fairy Tail members are assigned by the king of Fiore to recover the stolen Dragon Cry staff from another kingdom; Happy's fur turns red for a portion of the film as a side effect of eating one of the local fruits, which persists until he breathes fire.

Happy is also a character in all nine Fairy Tail original video animations (OVAs). In the first OVA, he gives a tour of the guild's all-female dormitory to Wendy Marvell and Carla; in the second, he is depicted as an academy professor; in the third, he is sent six years into the past by a magic book; in the fourth, Happy goes to a camp to support his friends' training for the Grand Magic Games; in the fifth, he spends time at a water park; the sixth is a crossover OVA of Fairy Tail and Hiro Mashima's Rave Master series, where Happy meets Rave Master protagonists Haru Glory and Elie; in the seventh, Happy participates in a penalty game; in the eighth, he tries to cheer Mavis Vermillion up by finding one of her missing belongings; and in the ninth, Happy attends a Christmas party held at Lucy's house. He also appears in every light novel based on the series, including one set in the Edo period, as well as one which is inspired by the Alice in Wonderland novel.

Happy makes a minor appearance in the Fairy Tail spin-off manga Fairy Tail Blue Mistral, which focuses on the characters Wendy and Carla in their early membership of the guild. He also features as the main protagonist of the manga Fairy Tail: Happy's Heroic Adventure, written and illustrated by Kenshirō Sakamoto.

Happy is a playable character in several Fairy Tail video games, such as the 2010 PlayStation Portable action video game Fairy Tail: Portable Guild developed by Konami, and its two sequels: Fairy Tail: Portable Guild 2, released in 2011, and Fairy Tail: Zeref Awakens, released in 2012.

== Reception ==
Happy has received positive comments from critics reviewing the Fairy Tail manga and its related media. Carl Kimlinger of Anime News Network (ANN) described Happy as "a misbegotten offspring of an alley cat and a bobblehead" in his review of the first manga volume, and called him "an excellent stooge" in the second volume. Dale North of Japanator praised the character's humor, commenting, "Happy's background gags will have you giggling chapter after chapter." For the anime adaptation, Carlo Santos of ANN called Happy "an entertaining diversion", praising his role as an animal sidekick that is "fun to listen to and not just a necessary annoyance". The reviewer found the story of Happy's birth in the anime to be "entertaining", but commented that it "could have been inserted anywhere in the series". Kimlinger praised Happy's role alongside Carla in the Edolas story arc, in which their status as Natsu and Wendy Marvell's respective sidekicks is deconstructed, with the reviewer calling them "the arc's emotional lynchpin". While Kimlinger wrote that while Happy's partnership with Natsu and Lucy was bizarre, he felt that their "oddball teamwork" represented the core part of the series' ensemble. Rebecca Silverman of ANN praised Happy's moments of heroism and being underestimated by the series' villains, saying, "For a character who usually plays the comic relief, this is a good change and a nice way to make him more relevant as a character than just being Natsu's transportation." In a review of the film Fairy Tail: Dragon Cry, Robert Prentice of Three If by Space considered the portion where Happy's fur turns red to be a "funny little side note".

In a Fairy Tail popularity poll published in the 26th issue of Weekly Shōnen Magazine, Happy ranked fourth with a total of 4238 votes. Merchandise based on Happy has been released, including a pin and café memo set.
