= List of Edens Zero characters =

Some of the main characters of Edens Zero, who constitute the crew of the titular spaceship. Clockwise from bottom-center: Shiki, Witch (bottom-left), Homura (front), Hermit (background), Happy, Rebecca, Pino, Sister, Weisz, and Mosco.

The main characters of Edens Zero depicted as three years older in the manga's second half. Clockwise from center: Shiki, Homura, Laguna, Mosco, Pino, Sister, Jinn, Kleene, Rebecca, Connor, Hermit, Weisz, and Happy.

The Edens Zero manga series features an extensive cast of characters created by Hiro Mashima. The story is set in a fictional universe called the Grand Shiki Cosmos (四季大宇宙, Shiki Daiuchū; lit. "Four Seasons Macrocosm"), which comprises multiple planetary systems called "cosmoses" that the protagonists navigate using the titular starship. The characters consist mainly of humans, robots, and aliens, the majority of which inhabit the "Sakura Cosmos".

Described as a "space fantasy" series by Mashima, Edens Zero depicts several characters that use a magic-like technique called Ether Gear (エーテルギア, Ēteru Gia) to harness their bodies' Ether—a magical power source—like the machines of their universe. Other characters include B-Cubers (B・キューバー, Bī Kyūbā), which are users of an online video platform based on YouTube, and cyborgs, alternatively called O-Tech (半分機械(オーテック), Ō Tekku) in the series. Multiple iterations of the same characters from alternate histories also feature prominently throughout the story, particularly those created by a time-devouring space monster called the Chronophage, and others who inhabit parallel universes across the multiverse.

Critics and readers have compared the characters' designs and attributes to those from Mashima's earlier series Fairy Tail, some of which they noted were intentionally derivative.

== Creation and conception ==
When developing Edens Zero, author Hiro Mashima wrote several characters' storylines to tie closely to the foundation of the story, which Mashima stated would "almost never change mid-series", amidst those he introduced and changed during the story's progression;^{[vol. 5]} he described his storytelling method as falling "somewhere in between" his previous works Rave Master, whose stories and characters he had largely worked out by the series' midway point, and Fairy Tail, where the only predetermined aspect was the backstory of protagonist Natsu Dragneel.^{[vol. 3]} Mashima's writing approach led him to include new characters to the main cast who were not originally planned to be, while several planned characters such as Homura and the Four Shining Stars were introduced earlier than intended, resulting in a majority of female characters joining the main cast over male characters.^{[vol. 4]}

A number of characters are modeled after characters from Rave Master and Fairy Tail, including Happy,^{[vol. 3]} Elsie Crimson (Erza Scarlet),^{[vol. 9]} and Justice (Sieg Hart and Jellal Fernandes). Plue, another recurring character in Mashima's manga who featured prominently in Rave Master, makes a minor appearance as well. The manga also includes fictionalized versions of YouTubers whom Mashima has met.^{[vol. 7]}

When discussing the series' villains, Mashima stated that his personal theme for Edens Zero was to make them "the absolute worst kind of trash possible" so that readers could look forward to their downfalls, while also giving them their own convictions that would lead them to battle the protagonists. He was influenced to do so after receiving comments from those who sympathized with villains that he intended to be "real [pieces] of garbage" in his previous works.^{[vol. 5]}

For the manga's second half, which advances the story by three years, Mashima deliberately gave minor visual changes to most of the characters' designs apart from Shiki, whom he wanted to "stand out"; he added that, with the exception of Hermit and Jinn's redesigns, there "wasn't really any thought" put into these changes.^{[vol. 20]}

== Edens Zero crew ==
The primary characters of the series are the crew of the Edens Zero (エデンズ ゼロ, Edenzu Zero)—Edens being an acronym for "Ether Drive Eternal Navigation System"—an interstellar warship left by Ziggy as inheritance to his adoptive grandson, Shiki.^{[ch. 15]} The crew's goal is to navigate the universe in search of Mother, both to prove her existence and have their wishes granted by her.^{[ch. 3, 48]}

In the story's second half, the Edens Zero is revealed to have come from 20,000 years in the future of Universe 3173, a parallel universe where androids suffer an Ether shortage due to Mother's disappearance and humankind's ensuing extinction. To prevent this, the ship was built on the planet Eden for Ziggy to travel to Universe Zero, a temporal convergence point that influences all other universes in the multiverse, using the power of Etherion (エーテリオン, Ēterion) to travel through time.^{[ch. 204, 205]} The crew uses Etherion to reach Universe Zero for the final story arc, where they regain their memories of past universes after living altered, often idyllic lives, while also retaining their experiences in the new world.^{[ch. 221, 222]}

=== Shiki Granbell ===
Voiced by: Takuma Terashima (Japanese); Sean Chiplock (English)

Shiki Granbell (シキ・グランベル, Shiki Guranberu) is the sole human denizen of Granbell, a theme park planet inhabited by robots.^{[ch. 1]} Shiki uses Gravity Ether Gear, "Satan Gravity" (サタングラビティ, Satan Gurabiti), to freely manipulate gravity for himself and others,^{[ch. 1, 82]} a power learned from his surrogate grandfather, Ziggy, who found the infant Shiki on a voyage for Mother beyond the Sakura Cosmos.^{[ch. 13]} He is characterized by his obsession with making friends, as well as a paralyzing fear of bugs.^{[ch. 87]} After Granbell's dying robot community chases him away with Rebecca to save him from solitude on their planet, Shiki searches for Mother to fulfill his goal of making 100 new friends across the universe.^{[ch. 1, 3]} In the process, he receives the Edens Zero from Elsie Crimson and inherits Ziggy's title of "Demon King" as the ship's captain.^{[ch. 14, 15]} Eventually, Shiki discovers his origins as the sole survivor of a dying planet Earth, Mother's original form 20,000 years in the past, who is first brought into the present era after the Chronophage briefly returns Mother to her planetary state.^{[ch. 272-275]} After recreating this event to save Earth, he and Rebecca settle on Granbell and have a daughter.^{[ch. 289, 293]}

Continuing his theme of naming protagonists after seasons, Mashima chose the Japanese word meaning "four seasons" (四季, shiki) for the main character of Edens Zero to represent the culmination of his previous works.^{[vol. 9]} The series' second half features the character's transition into a young man, which was planned early in development. Mashima hesitated to incorporate the change due to concerns of negative reactions from "fans of the boyishly cute Shiki"; he left traces of his old design to alleviate this, describing the change as "shifting him from cute to cool".^{[vol. 20]}

=== Rebecca Bluegarden ===
Voiced by: Mikako Komatsu (Japanese); Kira Buckland (English)

Rebecca Bluegarden (レベッカ・ブルーガーデン, Rebekka Burūgāden) is a B-Cuber and Shooting Starlight member from the planet Blue Garden,^{[ch. 1, 2]} where she lives after being separated from her parents, Connor and Rachel, during her childhood.^{[ch. 199, 209]} She aspires to attain one million subscribers for her B-Cube account, Aoneko Channel (AONEKOチャネル, Aoneko Chaneru; lit. "Blue Cat Channel"), which suffers from low viewership due to poor-quality content.^{[ch. 1, 4]} She is an expert markswoman who acquired her skills from playing first-person shooters.^{[ch. 2, 88]} After stimulating her Ether through repeated baths in the Edens Zero's spa, Rebecca develops her own Ether Gear called "Cat Leaper" (キャットリーパー, Kyatto Rīpā),^{[ch. 84]} which enhances her jumping power and agility,^{[ch. 64, 76]} and allows her to rewind time and mentally "leap" into parallel universes at different points in time;^{[ch. 85, 172]} this power serves as the basis of Etherion in the distant future, where she transforms into the Chronophage.^{[ch. 205, 291]} Mashima named the character after the Japanese band Rebecca, drawing inspiration from their song "Friends" to compliment Shiki's friend-obsessed personality.^{[vol. 9]}

=== Happy ===
Voiced by: Rie Kugimiya (Japanese); Tia Ballard (English)

Happy (ハッピー, Happī) is Rebecca's best friend and partner, based on the character of the same name from Fairy Tail.^{[vol. 2]} He is a feline alien from the planet Excede who was fatally injured in a traffic accident during Rebecca's childhood, leading their benefactor, Professor Weisz, to transfer Happy's mind into an identical android body to help him survive.^{[ch. 2, 11]} Happy can transform into a pair of firearms called Happy Blasters (ハッピーブラスター, Happī Burasutā), which fire non-lethal Ether bullets.^{[ch. 2]} He loses his mechanical abilities in Universe Zero, where he never experiences his accident and remains flesh and blood.^{[ch. 222]}

=== Weisz Steiner ===
Voiced by: Hiromichi Tezuka (Japanese); Ray Chase (young), Brook Chalmers (old) (English)

Weisz Steiner (ワイズ・シュタイナー, Waizu Shutainā) is a man from the planet Norma who practices the Ether Gear "Machina Maker" (マキナ・メイカー, Makina Meikā), which allows him to instantly remodel machines to improve their performance, deconstruct them, and create weapons.^{[ch. 11, 27]} As a result of Weisz fleeing Norma before the Chronophage rewinds fifty years of its history,^{[ch. 11]} there are two alternate versions of him that co-exist as separate people: his adolescent self, an amoral but good-natured criminal who joins the crew after betraying his gang leader, Sibir (シビル, Shibiru); and his elderly, present-day self, who has since matured into an esteemed robotics professor.^{[ch. 6, 11]} The young Weisz assumes a superhero identity named Arsenal (アーセナル, Āsenaru) using a powered exoskeleton that he customizes with his Machina Maker,^{[ch. 61, 62]} built with the help of Hermit Mio, with whom he eventually pursues a relationship in Universe Zero.^{[ch. 50, 256]}

Mashima described Weisz as "one of the good guys, but still a scumbag", which he noted is an uncommon character type among his works. He also said that Weisz's role in the story was "pretty clearly laid out", which made it "fairly easy to get [him] to do what I want".^{[vol. 2]}

=== E.M. Pino ===
Voiced by: Shiori Izawa (Japanese); Sarah Anne Williams (English)

E.M. Pino (EMピーノ, Ī Emu Pīno) is a miniature "anti-bot" android who generates an electromagnetic pulse (EMP) that disables machinery and Ether Gear within range for short periods of time.^{[ch. 7, 10]} Pino was built by Ziggy to become the "Light of Edens" (エデンズの光, Edenzu no Hikari), the "next generation" of androids to the Four Shining Stars,^{[ch. 19]} but had her memory erased by Weisz's gang when she arrived on Norma for maintenance from the present-day Weisz.^{[ch. 7]} She joins Shiki after assigning him as her new master,^{[ch. 10, 16]} later desiring to be reborn as a human through Mother.^{[ch. 42, 48]} During the crew's battle with Ziggy on Lendard, he restores some of Pino's memory while struggling against the Edens One's control, which allows her to fulfill her purpose of freeing him through her ability to Overdrive.^{[ch. 209]} In Universe Zero, she suffers a malfunction over learning the origins of the Four Shining Stars,^{[ch. 255, 256]} which leads to her eventual deactivation.^{[ch. 291]} She is later revived by Mother, deciding against being reincarnated as Shiki and Rebecca's human newborn and accepting her identity as a machine.^{[ch. 293]}

Mashima created Pino to serve as the mascot character of the series, but during development of the manga, he found it increasingly difficult to include her within the first chapter, where he incorporated Happy to stand in for her. As with Weisz, Mashima said that he found it "fairly easy" to write for Pino due to her established role in the story.^{[vol. 2]} He later called Pino his favorite character in the series, adding that he worked out "a lot" of story details for her, and that she would "probably" become an important character.^{[vol. 3]} Her name comes from Mashima's attempt to make the term "EMP" sound "cute".^{[vol. 9]}

=== Homura Kôgetsu ===
Voiced by: Shiki Aoki (Japanese); Laura Stahl (English)

Homura Kôgetsu (ホムラ・コウゲツ, Homura Kōgetsu) is a young swordswoman from Oedo, a planet styled after Edo period Japan.^{[ch. 57]} She is trained by Valkyrie Yuna to use the Ether Gear "Soul Blade" (ソウルブレイド, Sōru Bureido), which creates swords and bladed weapons made of solid Ether.^{[ch. 21]} Homura has the habit of voicing her inner thoughts by mistake, stemming from Valkyrie's encouragement for Homura to overcome her quiet nature as a child.^{[ch. 19, 47]} She first joins the crew to search for Valkyrie, who had gone missing for five years, and whom she regards as a mother figure after being abandoned ten years earlier by her uncaring biological mother, Kurenai.^{[ch. 57, 67]} After discovering Valkyrie's death on Sun Jewel,^{[ch. 58]} Homura takes her place in the Four Shining Stars as "Valkyrie Homura".^{[ch. 68, 69]} In Universe Zero's renewed history, she leads a miserable life in debt to Drakken Joe after witnessing Valkyrie's decapitation over Homura's accidental injuring of Seiji Hôjô, but recovers upon learning of Valkyrie's survival and reconciling with the now loving Kurenai.^{[ch. 232-234]} Mashima chose the character's name, which means "flame" (炎, homura), to give an impression of the color red and fire.^{[vol. 9]}

=== Four Shining Stars ===
The Demon King's Four Shining Stars (魔王四煌星, Maō Shikōsei) are a group of female androids created by Ziggy to serve aboard the Edens Zero.^{[ch. 15]} Its members possess functions that improve the ship's travel capacity,^{[ch. 16]} with all four required to authorize the use of Etherion.^{[ch. 69]} They also each possess a Battle Dress (バトルドレス, Batoru Doresu) that enhances their combat skills.^{[ch. 71]} The four are eventually revealed to be modeled after deceased humans from Earth who aided in the planet's transformation into Mother, and were given false memories as Ziggy's companions to function as Shiki's caretakers.^{[ch. 272-275]}

==== Witch Regret ====
Voiced by: Kiyono Yasuno (Japanese); Laura Post (English)

Witch Regret (ウィッチ・リグレット, Witchi Riguretto) is the "Shield of Edens" (エデンズの盾, Edenzu no Tate), a masked sorceress who protects and manages the Edens Zero.^{[ch. 15]} She is modeled after Shiki's biological mother, a defense attorney from New York City named Regret.^{[ch. 273, 275]} Witch manipulates her own Ether in a fashion similar to magic, using Shield Ether (シールドエーテル, Shīrudo Ēteru) to generate force fields, and Element Ether (属性エーテル, Zokusei Ēteru) to perform elemental attacks such as ice, air, and lightning.^{[ch. 71, 93]} She is portrayed as kind and gentle, yet ruthless towards those who threaten her crewmates.^{[ch. 93]} She is killed during the Aoi War, with Universe 2's version of her perishing with the rest of the crew against Shura's antimatter bombs, while Universe 3's version sacrifices herself to shield the ship from the explosion.^{[ch. 165, 166]} Her death is eventually undone when the crew travels to Universe Zero's past,^{[ch. 222]} although she does not regain her memories of previous worlds due to her absence during Etherion's activation.^{[ch. 222, 224]}

==== Sister Ivry ====
Voiced by: Yukiyo Fujii (Japanese); Allegra Clark (English)

Sister Ivry (シスター・イヴリィ, Shisutā Ivurii) is a dominatrix nun who serves as the ship's medic, the "Life of Edens" (エデンズの命, Edenzu no Inochi).^{[ch. 26, 88]} Her model, named Ivry, suffered an illness that plagued Earth before its destruction.^{[ch. 272]} Sister uses an ability called "Heal Atomizer" (ヒールアトマイザー, Hīru Atomaizā) that instantly heals wounds, cures afflictions, and repairs "living" machines such as herself and other androids.^{[ch. 19, 40]} She is described as "scary" and "foul-mouthed",^{[ch. 94]} and uses the masculine pronoun ore in Japanese.^{[ch. 26]} Sister is introduced as a hostage of the leader of Rogue Out (ローグアウト, Rōgu Auto), a mercenary squad on the planet Guilst, who had impersonated her for ten years to monopolize her healing powers.^{[ch. 20, 26]} In Universe Zero, her imposter's absence on Guilst leads Sister to form Rogue Out as a vigilante corps that opposes Drakken Joe.^{[ch. 224, 225]} When talking about Sister's full name, Mashima said that it had no particular meaning, choosing it because he "liked the sound of it".^{[vol. 9]}

==== Hermit Mio ====
Voiced by: Kanon Takao (Japanese); Xanthe Huynh (English)

Hermit Mio (ハーミット・ミオ, Hāmitto Mio) is a programmer android with the appearance and behavior of a young tsundere girl,^{[ch. 95]} modeled after a schoolgirl from Japan named Mio.^{[ch. 194, 272]} As the "Mind of Edens" (エデンズの心, Edenzu no Kokoro), she uses the hacking ability "Master Code" (マスターコード, Masutā Kōdo) to manage the ship's computer security and reprogram networked technology to her liking.^{[ch. 37, 89]} When first introduced, Hermit suffers from mental trauma due to being cruelly exploited and experimented upon fifteen years earlier by human researchers led by Müller,^{[ch. 40, 41]} causing her to isolate her mind within the virtual planet Digitalis.^{[ch. 30]} She initially rejects Shiki's friendship out of hatred for humans,^{[ch. 33]} but overcomes her mistrust after being moved by crew's kindness towards machines.^{[ch. 41]} In Universe Zero, she avoids her traumatic experience altogether due to Müller's absence from her life.^{[ch. 228, 232]}

Mashima originally named the character "Hermit Milon" (ハーミット・ミロン, Hāmitto Miron) in her profile, but changed it after realizing he had already used the name for another character in the manga. He derived the name "Mio" from the Japanese word miotsukushi (澪標; "channel marker"), which is used in waka as a pun on the phrase mi o tsukushi (身を尽くし; "to give one's all"), something that Mashima felt reflected her personality.^{[vol. 13]} When redesigning the character for the three-year time skip, Mashima changed Hermit's hairstyle due to her resemblance to Hatsune Miku, which he stated was not intentional.^{[vol. 20]}

==== Valkyrie Yuna ====
Voiced by: Miyuki Sawashiro (Japanese); Rebeka Thomas (English)

Valkyrie Yuna (ヴァルキリー・ユナ, Varukirī Yuna) is the "Sword of Edens" (エデンズの剣, Edenzu no Tsurugi), the manager of the Edens Zero's armaments,^{[ch. 69]} modeled after the American surfer and physicist Yuna.^{[ch. 257, 272]} She is also Homura's childhood guardian and Soul Blade mentor.^{[ch. 28]} Valkyrie is first mentioned as having been missing for five years, leading Homura to join the Edens Zero crew in search of her.^{[ch. 28, 47]} On Sun Jewel, Valkyrie is revealed to have been dead for three years after perishing against a horde of monsters unleashed by Kurenai, Homura's mother, whom Valkyrie freed from slavery in a misguided effort to reunite Homura with her biological family.^{[ch. 58, 59]} In Homura's revised childhood in Universe Zero, Valkyrie is decapitated for her student's injuring of Seiji Hôjô, but survives because of her android nature. She waits on Sun Jewel together with Kurenai for Homura, who aimlessly searches for her mother after mistaking Valkyrie for dead, allowing Valkyrie to reunite with her student and crewmates.^{[ch. 232-235]} Mashima chose the character's full name because he wanted her to be "a darker-skinned character with a classically Japanese name".^{[vol. 9]}

=== Other crew members ===
==== Mosco Versa-0 ====
Voiced by: Mitsuo Iwata (Japanese); Brock Powell (English)

Mosco Versa-0 (モスコ = ヴェルサー零, Mosuko Verusā Rei) is a white-colored sumo android who works aboard the Edens Zero as its caretaker and Sister's verbally and physically abused servant.^{[ch. 28]} He specializes in tsuppari techniques, which allow him to fly.^{[ch. 22, 96]} He also has a button on his belly that Sister forbids anyone from pressing;^{[ch. 28]} it is eventually revealed that doing so transforms him into Cosmo (コスモ, Kosumo), a handsome butler who exerts total dominance over Sister.^{[ch. 260]} Debuting as a member of Rogue Out who is reprogrammed to follow Sister's imposter, Mosco resumes his original duties after the real Sister restores him.^{[ch. 19, 28]} In Universe Zero's revised history, he returns to being a Rogue Out member under the real Sister as a vigilante with dozens of identical robotic copies.^{[ch. 225]}

Mashima did not originally plan to include Mosco in the Edens Zero crew, making the decision after he "took a liking" to the character while drawing him.^{[vol. 4]} The author based Mosco's name on the character's predetermined catchphrase, "Moscoy" (モスコイ, Mosukoi),^{[vol. 9]} which comes from the sumo term dosukoi.^{[ch. 18]}

==== Jinn ====
Voiced by: Yuuki Shin (Japanese); Jonah Scott (English)

Jinn (ジン, Jin), truly named Kris Rutherford (クリス・ラザフォード, Kurisu Razafōdo),^{[ch. 95]} is an O-Tech ninja who first appears as part of the mercenary squad Rogue Out,^{[ch. 17]} and later as a minion of Drakken Joe.^{[ch. 77]} He uses the Ether Gear "Wind Rage" (ウィンドレイジ, Windo Reiji) to perform ninjutsu techniques that produce winds with typhoon-like force.^{[ch. 18, 144]} During his childhood, Jinn is made into a cyborg by Müller, who orphaned and dismembered him in front of his younger sister, Kleene, as revenge against their parents for withdrawing their financial support.^{[ch. 18, 126]} Jinn seeks Sister out to cure Kleene's mental trauma from the incident,^{[ch. 126]} which allows Rogue Out's leader to deceive him by impersonating Sister until he kills the imposter upon her exposure.^{[ch. 26]} He boards the Edens Zero after gaining the real Sister's cooperation,^{[ch. 95]} remaining distant from the crew until Sister successfully treats Kleene.^{[ch. 129, 130]} In Universe Zero's altered history, Jinn willingly becomes an O-Tech as part of his home planet's culture, but is forced into Drakken's service with Kleene after coming to Guilst by mistake while studying abroad.^{[ch. 226, 232]}

The code name "Jinn" is taken from the wind spirit of the same name.^{[vol. 9]} Mashima gave the character "a lot more hair" to make him easier to draw during the series' second half, citing difficulties of drawing him consistently in the first half.^{[vol. 20]}

==== Kleene Rutherford ====
Voiced by: Rumi Okubo

Kleene Rutherford (クリーネ・ラザフォード, Kurīne Razafōdo) is Jinn's younger sister, introduced as Sylph (シルフ, Shirufu), the Element 4's representative of wind.^{[ch. 74, 77]} Her Ether Gear, "Wind Snatch" (ウィンドスナッチ, Windo Sunatchi), creates air currents capable of absorbing objects, redirecting projectiles, and trapping people in wind cages.^{[ch. 75]} She suffers from mental breakdowns whenever she experiences any emotion, caused by a repressed memory of Müller forcing her to watch Jinn's dismemberment during their childhood, which requires her to wear emotion-suppressing devices on her head that also indicate her mood.^{[ch. 92, 126]} She joins the crew with Jinn after Sister cures her condition by erasing her memories of the event.^{[ch. 129, 130]} She avoids her traumatic experience in Universe Zero due to Müller's absence, although she becomes Drakken Joe's minion anyway along with Jinn after coming to Guilst by mistake.^{[ch. 226, 232]}

==== Laguna Husert ====
Voiced by: Taku Yashiro

Laguna Husert (ラグナ・ヒューゼルト, Raguna Hyūzeruto) is a cross-dressing man who uses the water-manipulation Ether Gear "Tears Lover" (ティアーズラバー, Tiāzu Rabā), which he combines with Empire Ether (Note: Empire Ether (エンパイアエーテル, Enpaia Ēteru) is a skill used by natives of the Aoi Cosmos that allows the user's Ether Gear to influence others' bodies in addition to or in place of their own.^{[ch. 157]}) to transform others into water whenever they cry.^{[ch. 72, 157]} Originally a stage actor, he suffers from an inability to cry naturally due to his over-commitment to his roles, which has led to his retirement.^{[ch. 169]} He first appears as the Element 4's representative of water,^{[ch. 72]} later to be inducted into the Edens Zero crew by Witch after proving himself to be among his team's more humane members.^{[ch. 110]} He is later revealed to be an estranged member of Oasis (オアシス, Oashisu), a rebel faction opposing the Nero Empire, who deserted in pursuit of greater power to avenge his best friend's death from an imperial raid.^{[ch. 140, 169]} In Universe Zero, Laguna is Oasis's leader and a film actor.^{[ch. 226, 227]}

==== Couchpo ====
Voiced by: Satomi Arai (Japanese); Janice Kawaye (English)

Couchpo (カウチポ, Kauchipo) is a famous B-Cube personality and gourmand who produces food videos and reviews for her account, MoguMogu Channel (モグモグch., Mogumogu Chaneru);^{[ch. 19]} her real name is Chloé Françoise Ai (クロエ・フランソワーズ・愛, Kuroe Furansowāzu Ai).^{[ch. 147]} First meeting Rebecca when they and several other B-Cubers are abducted by Rogue Out,^{[ch. 18]} Couchpo joins the crew during another encounter on the planet Foresta after being enamored with the ship's kitchen,^{[ch. 133]} and provides critiques that help bolster Rebecca's popularity.^{[ch. 134, 171]} After traveling to Universe Zero, she uses her online influence to assist in luring the Chronophage to restore Mother to her original form as Earth.^{[ch. 220, 278]}

==== Connor ====
Voiced by: Kenta Sasa (Japanese); Paul St. Peter (English)

Captain Connor (キャプテン・コナー, Kyaputen Konā) is a spaceship captain from the Aoi Cosmos.^{[ch. 49]} He appears as a pompous and eccentric middle-aged man with expert piloting skills, using unorthodox methods to push ships beyond their usual capabilities.^{[ch. 175]} As the story transitions through different universes, the crew meets alternate versions of Connor that only Rebecca remembers: the original Connor from Universe 1 is the Edens One's shipwrecked captain whom the Zero crew rescues en route to Sun Jewel;^{[ch. 49]} in Universe 2, he is a reluctant servant of Ziggy who is hired as the One's pilot;^{[ch. 102]} and in Universe 3, he is an escaped worker from Ziggy's robot factory on Lendard who has no knowledge of the One.^{[ch. 171]} He is eventually confirmed to be Rebecca's father, whose wife, Rachel, left him with their newborn daughter to protect him from being killed by her church for their forbidden marriage,^{[ch. 209]} with Universe 3's Connor joining the Zero crew and reuniting with his family after discovering his relationship with Rebecca.^{[ch. 175, 217]} In Universe Zero, he declines returning to the crew to remain with Rachel on planet Miltz.^{[ch. 251]}

The character's design underwent multiple changes during development, all depicting him as thinner and more attractive than the finished version as an overweight old man, with different hairstyles varying from a receding hairline to "silky smooth" hair. After storyboarding Connor's debut appearance, Mashima received input from his editor that Connor's feats were "not very interesting" for a "good-looking" character to perform. According to Mashima, the final design received complaints from his female staff over the change.^{[vol. 6]}

== Supporting characters ==
=== Edens One crew ===
The Edens One (エデンズ ワン, Edenzu Wan) is a more advanced successor to the Edens Zero, which serves as its prototype.^{[ch. 102, 103]} Initially helmed by Connor, it is destroyed prior to the Zero crew's voyage to Sun Jewel in Universe 1,^{[ch. 49]} but is undamaged in all subsequent universes.^{[ch. 100]} The ship is commanded by Ziggy after his resurrection, with the ship's crew becoming the primary antagonistic group faced by the Zero crew as they seek the extinction of humanity.^{[ch. 101, 104]} Following Ziggy's destruction, he is revealed to have been controlled by the Edens One itself, which possesses the time-displaced consciousness of Shiki and Rebecca's unborn child from Universe 3173,^{[ch. 267]} making the ship artificially intelligent and the true main antagonist of the series.^{[ch. 215]}

==== Ziggy ====
Voiced by: Hōchū Ōtsuka (Japanese); John Eric Bentley (English)

Ziggy (ジギー, Jigī) is Shiki's adoptive grandfather, an android who portrays the "Demon King" (魔王, Maō) at the Granbell Kingdom theme park.^{[ch. 1]} Introduced as a good and kind figure who broke down from old age ten years before the series' beginning, Ziggy discovered Shiki at the end of his voyage for Mother, raising him to use his own Satan Gravity ability.^{[ch. 1, 14]} When Shiki revisits Granbell in the present day, Ziggy reactivates with a malevolent personality that desires Shiki's death and the dominance of machines over humans.^{[ch. 101]} During his and Shiki's final battle on Lendard, Ziggy reveals himself to be a mechanized version of Shiki from Universe 3173, where he was sent 20,000 years into the future by a spacetime distortion on Nero 66 before using Etherion to travel back in time to save humankind from extinction, gaining amnesia in the process.^{[ch. 203-205]} Upon discovering the One's control over Ziggy, Shiki is forced to destroy him to break his connection to the ship.^{[ch. 214, 215]} In Universe Zero, Ziggy prolongs his life and avoids falling under the ship's control.^{[ch. 266, 267]}

Mashima named the character after the song "Ziggy Stardust" by singer David Bowie, which the author listened to frequently during the manga's production; the name "Ziggy" was originally given to Shiki in the story's earliest draft.^{[vol. 9]} Mashima noted that several readers were able to predict the character's backstory before it was revealed, although he stated that there would be "at least one" element to surprise readers due to the backstory's "complex" nature.^{[vol. 20]}

==== Over Nu Etherion Void ====
Over Nu Etherion Void (ONE・ヴォイド, Ōbā Nyū Ēterion Voido) (Note: The letters "ONE" are glossed with furigana as オーバー・ニュー・エーテリオン.) is the Edens One's android host in Universe Zero, built using God Acnoella's Möbius System.^{[ch. 235, 236]} As an avatar for Shiki and Rebecca's disembodied child, his body allows him to use his powers of Satan Gravity and Cat Leaper inherited from his parents,^{[ch. 267]} while his face strongly resembles Shiki, simulating the child's hypothetical appearance as a grown man.^{[ch. 268, 271]} Despite being designed to have superior armor and Ether to Ziggy,^{[ch. 235]} Void is eventually destroyed in battle alongside the One by Ziggy and the Edens Zero, respectively.^{[ch. 285]} In the final chapter, the child's alternate self, a girl, is born on Granbell.^{[ch. 293]}

==== Four Dark Stars ====
The Demon King's Four Dark Stars (魔王四黒星, Maō Shikokusei) are a group of four male androids built as the Edens One's successors to the Four Shining Stars.^{[ch. 103]} Like the Shining Stars, the Dark Stars are modeled after humans from Earth, each of whom is acquainted with his respective Shining Star counterpart's model.^{[ch. 272-275]}

- Wizard (ウィザード, Wizādo) is a magician who performs magic-like Ether attacks.^{[ch. 187]} His human model, Leonard (レナード, Renādo), is the judicial colleague and husband of Witch's model, Regret, as well as Shiki's biological father.^{[ch. 257, 273]} He is voiced by Taishi Murata in Japanese.
- Clown (クラウン, Kuraun) is an effeminate clown who generates poison and afflicts others with traumatic nightmares.^{[ch. 190]} His human model, Cooper (クーパー, Kūpā), is a surgeon who treated Sister's model, Ivry.^{[ch. 217]} He is voiced by Junichi Yanagita in Japanese.
- Brigandine (ブリガンダイン, Burigandain) is a hulking warrior with a nearly indestructible body.^{[ch. 197]} His human model, Howard (ハワード, Hawādo), is a surfer friend of Valkyrie's model, Yuna.^{[ch. 274]} He is voiced by Shōta Yamamoto in Japanese.
- Killer (キラー, Kirā) is an assassin and programmer who creates holographic dimensions and illusions.^{[ch. 186, 192]} His unnamed human model is the senpai of Hermit's model, Mio.^{[ch. 194]} He is voiced by Aoi Ichikawa in Japanese.

=== Oración Seis Galáctica ===
The Oración Seis Galáctica (Spanish for "Galactic Prayer Six"), known in Japanese as Ginga Rokumashō (銀河六魔将, lit. "Galactic Six Demon Generals"), are a group of six powerful, intergalactic outlaws who are described as being capable of "crushing" planets.^{[ch. 32]} Over the course of the story, Shiki and Ziggy are branded as members following the defeats of Drakken Joe and Poseidon Nero.^{[ch. 170, 199]} In Universe Zero, the Galáctica are a faction of androids commanded by Void.^{[ch. 236]}

==== Elsie Crimson ====
Voiced by: Sayaka Ohara (Japanese); Colleen Clinkenbeard (English)

Elsie Crimson (エルシー・クリムゾン, Erushī Kurimuzon) is an armored warrior who uses the Ether Gear "Star Drain" (スタードレイン, Sutā Dorein) to absorb planetary Ether and convert it into battle gear or energy attacks.^{[ch. 2, 118]} Introduced as a benevolent space pirate captain who is notorious for conquering the "seven cosmic seas", Elsie delivers the Edens Zero to Shiki to repay a debt to Ziggy, her childhood benefactor.^{[ch. 12, 103]} Her true identity is later revealed to be Elsie Le Lendard (エルシー = ル = レンダード, Erushī Ru Rendādo), the planet Lendard's crown princess, who unintentionally caused a civil war while opposing her corrupt parents during her childhood, orphaning herself and her arranged fiancé, James Holloway.^{[ch. 124, 183]} After dying with James on Lendard when the planet is consumed by the Chronophage,^{[ch. 216]} Elsie appears in Universe Zero as Lendard's queen and the Interstellar Union Army's director of operations in the Kaede Cosmos.^{[ch. 247]}

The character is modeled after Fairy Tail character Erza Scarlet, with her name being a portmanteau of "Erza" (エルザ, Eruza) and the word "sea" to reflect her role as a pirate.^{[vol. 9]} Mashima commented on her and Justice's relationship, which he described as "a very star-crossed destiny".^{[vol. 15]}

==== Drakken Joe ====
Voiced by: Taiten Kusunoki (Japanese); Armen Taylor (English)

Drakken Joe (ドラッケン・ジョー, Dorakken Jō), named after the video game Drakkhen,^{[vol. 9]} is a loan shark who controls the Sakura Cosmos's criminal underworld.^{[ch. 28, 70]} He uses the Ether Gear "Alchemist" (アルケミスト, Arukemisuto) to transmute anything into different materials and forms of matter.^{[ch. 43, 79]} Raised as a test subject with a fifteen-year life expectancy,^{[ch. 98]} Drakken sustains his youth for over 200 years with a machine that steals people's life force, but also deteriorates his physical health.^{[ch. 91, 96]} He targets the Edens Zero to extract Rebecca's Cat Leaper for himself, viewing her mental time travel ability as a more efficient means of immortality.^{[ch. 97]} Following an encounter with Drakken that results in Shiki's death in Universe 1,^{[ch. 83]} Rebecca escapes to the parallel Universe 2, where the crew is able to reverse his life-support system, aging him into a feeble old man.^{[ch. 96-99]} In Universe Zero's altered history, Drakken possesses a stronger moral code and sustains himself on the life energy of animals instead of people.^{[ch. 231]}

==== Poseidon Nero ====
Voiced by: Takaya Hashi

Poseidon Nero (ポセイドン・ネロ) is a cephalopod-like alien who possesses the Empire Dice (帝国歴程(エンパイアダイス), Enpaia Daisu), a set of dice Relics (Note: A "Relic" (遺物(レリック), Rerikku) in Edens Zero refers to any object imbued with Mother's Ether, some of which possess mystical powers.^{[ch. 111, 162]}) that foretell favorable outcomes at a personal cost.^{[ch. 162]} He also uses the Ether Gear "Wormhole" (ワームホール, Wāmuhōru) to create portals that instantly transport himself and others to different locations in the universe.^{[ch. 163]} Nero first appears as the emperor of the Aoi Cosmos, who sacrificed his friends, family, and species to build the Nero Empire.^{[ch. 106, 162]} His former friend Ziggy kills him after destroying his dice and absorbing his Ether Gear,^{[ch. 164, 167]} which he imparts onto Shiki three years later.^{[ch. 215]} In Universe Zero, Nero is Drakken Joe's business partner and the Element 4's representative of water after abdicating to Shura, his adoptive son.^{[ch. 226, 227]}

==== Deadend Crow and Cure ====
Voiced by: Seiichiro Yamashita (Cure)

Deadend Crow (デッドエンド・クロウ, Deddoendo Kurō) is a 420-meter-tall (1380 ft.) android and mass murderer of over one million humans on the Yukino Cosmos planet Swan in an event called the "Bloody Atmos Day" incident.^{[ch. 177, 179]} He partners with Ziggy on Lendard in exchange for dominion over the Kaede Cosmos.^{[ch. 180]} Crow is later revealed to be a creation and alter ego of Cure (キュアー, Kyuā), a regenerating android and treacherous officer of the Interstellar Union Army who obsesses over cosmic balance between good and evil.^{[ch. 207]} In Universe Zero, Cure appears as a Galáctica member named "Deadend Cure", but is permanently destroyed by Jinn.^{[ch. 236]} The reveal of Cure's villainous nature was a spontaneous decision Mashima made during the weekly writing phase of the manga, as Mashima was looking to reduce the number of characters involved at the time, despite feeling the character should have played a more active role.^{[vol. 24]}

==== God Acnoella ====
God Acnoella (ゴッド・アクネラ, Goddo Akunera) is an android woman who commands a swarm of cybernetic dragons that she "births" on the Kaede Cosmos planet Lendard.^{[ch. 182, 212]} She allies with Ziggy in his conquest of humanity,^{[ch. 181]} loaning him Möbius (メビウス, Mebiusu), the perpetual motion machine that produces her dragons, to expand his army.^{[ch. 212]} She is destroyed by Elsie Crimson immediately upon revealing her true identity as Shaya Le Lendard (シャイア = ル = レンダード, Shaia Ru Rendādo), Elsie's formerly human mother and Lendard's ruthless queen.^{[ch. 124, 212]} She appears again in Universe Zero as the only Galáctica member to retain her position from the previous world,^{[ch. 236]} but is defeated by Homura Kôgetsu.^{[ch. 269]} Mashima decided on Acnoella's true identity some time before revealing it in the story; due to the story's pacing, her battle with Elsie was simplified from its originally planned version.^{[vol. 24]}

==== Saintfire Nox ====
Saintfire Nox (セントファイア・ノックス, Sentofaia Nokkusu) is an alias used by the archbishop of the Church of Saintfire, a cult with jurisdiction over time.^{[ch. 200, 218]} At the beginning of the series, the name belongs to Rebecca Bluegarden's mother and Connor's wife, Rachel (レイチェル, Reicheru), who is forced into the position after the death of her own mother, the previous Nox.^{[ch. 218]} Around Rebecca's birth, Rachel abandons her family to prevent her church's fanatics from killing them for their forbidden relationship, exhausting her Cat Leaper's time-reversing ability after thousands of attempts to avoid their deaths.^{[ch. 218]} She is captured by Ziggy to extract her Ether and locate Mother in Universe 3,^{[ch. 199]} allowing Rachel to reunite with her family after being rescued by the Edens Zero.^{[ch. 218]} In Universe Zero, Rachel becomes the Interstellar Union Army's director of operations in the Yukino Cosmos, who fosters the army's support of the Edens Zero after regaining her memories of the previous world.^{[ch. 247]}

==== Müller ====
Voiced by: Yōhei Tadano (Japanese); John Snyder (English)

Müller (ミュラー, Myurā) is a human mad scientist introduced as Hermit's primary abuser who manipulates her into destroying the robot planet Hook, an event leading to his arrest.^{[ch. 40, 41]} He appears in the series' present as an O-Tech employed by the Edens One after losing his original body in a botched prison escape,^{[ch. 121]} conducting torturous experiments on Jinn and Kleene during their childhood to perfect his cybernetic body,^{[ch. 126]} which Weisz destroys.^{[ch. 127]} In Universe Zero, Müller is the head of Poseidon Shura's imperial science department who fuses with a robotic duplicate of Xenolith to serve Void as one of the Oración Seis Galáctica,^{[ch. 239, 240]} but is destroyed by Shiki.^{[ch. 244]}

==== Joker Helix ====
Joker Helix (ジョーカー・ヘリックス, Jōkā Herikkusu) is one of the Galáctica members in Universe Zero.^{[ch. 236]} Originating as an AI-powered game engine developed by Professor Weisz Steiner, she becomes self-aware and gains an android body capable of creating video game-like dimensions. She is equipped with a Delta Time Reactor (Δtリアクター, Deruta Taimu Riakutā) that slows time within a certain radius until it is nearly frozen.^{[ch. 249-252]} She obsesses over playing with Rebecca Bluegarden, the first person to play her games, which allows Rebecca to convince Joker to abandon Void; afterward, she leaves for parts unknown.^{[ch. 254, 255]}

==== Lightning Law ====
Lightning Law (ライトニング・ロー, Raitoningu Rō) is an android monk and one of the Galáctica members in Universe Zero.^{[ch. 236]} He manipulates electricity and other androids using his "Metal Gore Hypnos" (メタルゴアヒプノス, Metaru Goa Hipunosu) technique.^{[ch. 259, 261]} He is destroyed by Laguna Husert after momentarily succeeding in killing Shiki Granbell, whose death is averted by Rebecca Bluegarden.^{[ch. 261-263]}

==== Lady Freyja ====
Lady Freyja (レディ・フレイヤ, Redi Fureiya) is an android soldier and Galáctica member in Universe Zero.^{[ch. 236]} She is programmed with mastery of every known armament, which she wields using the Hundred Arms (百武芸, Hyaku Bugei), a pair of swords that mechanically transform into different weapons.^{[ch. 279, 282]} She follows Void with the intent to die by his hand, having become suicidal after rebelling against her creators and failing to find anyone who could match her strength. Her lack of will to live allows her to be bested in combat and destroyed by Homura Kôgetsu during a suicide mission aboard the Edens Zero.^{[ch. 281, 282]}

=== Shooting Starlight ===
Shooting Starlight (流星の灯, Ryūsei no Tomoshibi) is an adventurers' guild on the planet Blue Garden that Shiki joins, with Rebecca, and Happy beginning as members.^{[ch. 2, 3]}

==== Noah Glenfield ====
Voiced by: Nobuhiko Okamoto (Japanese); Billy Kametz (English)

Noah Glenfield (ノア・グレンフィールド, Noa Gurenfīrudo) is Shooting Starlight's guild master,^{[ch. 43]} which serves as a front for his role as director of the Galactic Intelligence Agency's Sakura Cosmos branch; in Universe Zero, he is instead the Interstellar Union Army's director of operations for the Sakura Cosmos.^{[ch. 100, 247]} He uses the Ether Gear "Eye of God" (ゴッドアイ, Goddo Ai; lit. "God Eye") to observe any non-mechanical being's position across space and time, which leads him to discover Rebecca's time-leaping ability during her childhood.^{[ch. 88, 173]}

==== Labilia Christy ====
Voiced by: Ayumi Ayano (Japanese); Lizzie Freeman (English)

Labilia Christy (ラビリア・クリスティ, Rabiria Kurisuti), whose name is derived from the word "lovely",^{[vol. 9]} is a Shooting Starlight member and highly popular B-Cuber in the Sakura Cosmos.^{[ch. 3]} Depicted as a former friend to Rebecca, whose videos inspired Labilia to become a content creator as a means of coping with a terminal illness,^{[ch. 178]} she bullies Rebecca and produces videos mocking her content out of disdain for her lack of talent.^{[ch. 16, 53]} In Universe 3, three years after her channel loses its popularity, she reconciles with Rebecca and is taken aboard the Edens Zero to be treated for her illness.^{[ch. 176, 178]} She subsequently travels back in time with the crew to Universe Zero,^{[ch. 220]} where she uses her online influence to help them lure the Chronophage to restore Mother to her original form as Earth.^{[ch. 278]}

=== Interstellar Union Army ===
The Interstellar Union Army (星系連盟軍, Seikei Renmeigun) is the cosmic government's military and peacekeeping force.^{[ch. 13]} Its six elite officers form an organization called the Oración Seis Interstellar (Note: Written as "Oración Seis Interestelar" (Spanish for "Interstellar Prayer Six") in the digital simulpub release.)—simply called the Oración Seis (星系六祈将(オラシオンセイス), Orashion Seisu) in Japanese—to combat the Oración Seis Galáctica.^{[ch. 106]} The team's initial members are Justice, Jaguar, Holy, Eraser, Feather, and Cure;^{[ch. 106]} in Universe Zero, Victory and Amira take Justice and Cure's places.^{[ch. 244]} Another army faction is an intelligence service called the Galactic Intelligence Agency (銀河系諜報機関, Gingakei Chōhō Kikan; "G.I.A."),^{[ch. 36]} with Noah Glenfield acting as director of its Sakura Cosmos branch.^{[ch. 100]}

==== Justice ====
Voiced by: Daisuke Namikawa (Japanese); Robert McCollum (English)

Justice (ジャスティス, Jasutisu) is the code name for James Holloway (ジェームス・ホロウェイ, Jēmusu Horowei), a prince and Elsie Crimson's childhood fiancé from the planet Lendard.^{[ch. 124]} Like Elsie, he uses Star Drain to absorb and manipulate the Ether of planets.^{[ch. 123]} He debuts as an Interstellar Union Army officer who vengefully pursues Elsie for inciting the war that destroyed their home nation and families, antagonizing the Edens Zero crew for their association with her.^{[ch. 122-124]} However, he loses his hatred for Elsie after realizing her regret for her actions, and allows himself to be erased from existence with her on Lendard when the Chronophage rewinds the planet's time.^{[ch. 213, 216]} In Universe Zero, where the war is averted, James remains happily engaged to Elsie and never joins the army.^{[ch. 247]}

Mashima modeled Justice after the character Sieg Hart from his earlier manga Rave Master, following a "tradition" of using such characters that includes Jellal Fernandes from Fairy Tail, reflected by the character's blue hair color and markings around his right eye when his Ether Gear is active. The character's code name was selected to reflect his sense of justice.^{[vol. 9]}

==== Victory and Creed ====
Voiced by: Yūki Sanpei (Victory), Yūdai Mino (Creed) (Japanese); Joe Hernandez (Victory), Shannon McKain (Creed) (English)

Victory (ビクトリー, Bikutorī) and Creed (クリード, Kurīdo) are Justice's subordinates aboard his commando carrier, the Angel Feather,^{[ch. 13]} which is captained by Victory in Universe Zero.^{[ch. 244]} Victory is burly man who uses the Ether Gear "Titan's Arm" (タイタンズアーム, Taitanzu Āmu) to become a powerful giant,^{[ch. 13, 122]} while Creed—whose true identity is Seiji Hôjô (セイジ・ホウジョウ, Seiji Hōjō), a member of Oedo's shogunate family^{[ch. 159]}—is a bespectacled man who shrinks others and encages them with his "Ether Lock" (エーテルロック, Ēteru Rokku) ability.^{[ch. 13, 122]}

==== Jaguar ====
Voiced by: Atsushi Ono (Japanese); Jason Marnocha (English)

Captain (Note: The title is the navy rank equivalent of taisa (大佐), which is alternatively translated as the army rank "colonel" in the series.) Jaguar (ジャガー, Jagā) is Justice's superior officer and a reformed member of the Oración Seis Galáctica, notorious for his uncontrollable nature.^{[ch. 106, 161]} He uses Ether Gear to assume a humanoid jaguar form capable of tearing humans apart with a single blow.^{[ch. 156]} He is killed by Poseidon Nero during battle against him and Ziggy on the planet Nero 1, which he avoids in Universe Zero.^{[ch. 160, 244]}

==== Amira ====
Voiced by: Megumi Satō (Japanese); Emi Lo (English)

Amira (アミラ) is a G.I.A. agent who uses the shapeshifting ability "Mirror Face" (ミラーフェイス, Mirā Feisu) to copy others' appearances and memories.^{[ch. 36]} She impersonates Homura Kôgetsu on Digitalis in an attempt to infiltrate Drakken Joe's syndicate,^{[ch. 37]} later allying with the Edens Zero crew to defeat Drakken.^{[ch. 93]} In Universe Zero, she uses the code name "Face" (フェイス, Feisu) as one the Oración Seis Interstellar.^{[ch. 243, 244]} Mashima designed Amira "real quick" while developing the identity of Homura's imposter on Digitalis, deciding that a new character would be more interesting than Justice, his original choice.^{[vol. 5]}

==== Holy ====
Voiced by: Aya Endō

Holy (ホーリィ, Hōrii) is a woman who uses the Ether Gear "Melt" (メルト, Meruto) to dissolve any person or substance.^{[ch. 106, 201]} She is a survivor of the Bloody Atmos Day mass murder performed by Deadend Crow, against whom she seeks revenge for publicly crucifying her and killing her younger sister, Sara (サラ),^{[ch. 177, 202]} a fate they avoid in Universe Zero.^{[ch. 280]} She tentatively joins the Edens Zero crew in Universe 3, intending to apprehend them afterwards,^{[ch. 179]} but spares them after being moved by their emotional support and betrayed by her teammate Cure, Crow's creator.^{[ch. 207, 217]} Her real name is Reina (レイナ),^{[ch. 246]} taken from the Rave Master character Reina. Mashima noted the character's popularity among readers, and hoped to "do her justice" when developing her.^{[vol. 21]}

==== Eraser ====
Voiced by: Masaya Matsukaze

Eraser (イレイサー, Ireisā) is a man with the ability to erase people and objects from existence.^{[ch. 139, 168]} His real name is Hamrio (ハムリオ, Hamurio), shared with the Rave Master character Hamrio Musica. Mashima reused Eraser's name and design for an antagonist in the Fairy Tail mini-series Re:Fantasia.

==== Feather ====
Feather (フェザー, Fezā) is a woman who commands the army's fastest fleet, composed of Racer-class warships.^{[ch. 168, 175]} She uses an Ether Gear similar to Noah Glenfield's "Eye of God" called the "Eye of Venus" (ヴィーナス・アイ, Vīnasu Ai; lit. "Venus Eye"), which allows her to observe any person's location in the universe and anticipate their movements.^{[ch. 174]} In Universe Zero, she serves as Saintfire Nox's assistant on planet Miltz.^{[ch. 248]}

=== Nero Empire ===
The Nero Empire (ネロ帝国, Nero Teikoku) is a militant galactic empire governed by Poseidon Nero that spans the entire Aoi Cosmos.^{[ch. 106]} The empire has influence over the Aoi Cosmos's machinery through the All-Link System (オールリンクシステム, Ōru Rinku Shisutemu), a network on the planet Nero 66 that activates when all Aoi planets are submerged in the cosmic ocean's high tide.^{[ch. 136]} In Universe Zero, Shura reestablishes the empire as a republic after succeeding Nero.^{[ch. 245]}

==== Poseidon Shura ====
Voiced by: Kenichi Suzumura

Poseidon Shura (ポセイドン・シュラ) is Nero's adoptive human son and heir, and a Satan Gravity user who was briefly tutored by Ziggy as a child.^{[ch. 131]} First appearing as a brutal and insane prince neglected by his father,^{[ch. 158]} Shura wages war against Ziggy in a conspiracy to eliminate him, Nero, and the Aoi Cosmos's robot population with the All-Link System;^{[ch. 136]} he simultaneously torments Shiki after the latter spurns his friendship for his genocidal plans.^{[ch. 142, 143]} He is killed when Ziggy attempts to create a time loop by destroying the planet with Nero's supply of 20,000 antimatter bombs, thereby causing the spacetime distortion that would transform Shiki into Ziggy.^{[ch. 166, 204]} Shura reappears in Universe Zero as a compassionate figure who befriends Shiki after allying with him against Müller.^{[ch. 230, 245]}

==== Oceans 6 ====
The Oceans 6 (オーシャンズ6, Ōshanzu Shikkusu) are Nero's special forces team.^{[ch. 130, 145]} Besides veteran members Cyca (サイカ, Saika) and Fabiano (ファビアーノ, Fabiāno), the four younger members are Empire Ether users;^{[ch. 147]} their designs and abilities were included in the series as four of the five winning entries of an official "original Ether Gear" contest held on Twitter between September 26 and October 31, 2020.

- Callum Steelford (カルム・スティールフォード, Karumu Sutīrufōdo) is Jinn's childhood rival who controls mist and disintegrates his opponents through his Ether Gear, "Carburetor" (キャブレター, Kyaburetā).^{[ch. 154]} He is voiced by Shūhei Iwase in Japanese.
- Lyra (リラ, Rira) is a card player who uses the Ether Gear "Gambler's Rush" (ギャンブラーラッシュ, Gyanburā Rasshu) to alter the values of playing cards and perform random elemental attacks.^{[ch. 153, 155]} She is voiced by Ikumi Hasegawa in Japanese.
- Nasseh (ナセ, Nase) is a man who creates electric signals through his Ether Gear, "Eye of Horus" (アイ・オブ・ホルス, Ai obu Horusu), to perform hypnosis.^{[ch. 148]} He is voiced by Shōmaru Zōza in Japanese.
- Mirrani Lucra (ミラーニ・ルクラ, Mirāni Rukura; also "Milani") is a woman whose Ether Gear, "Mirror Trick" (ミラートリック, Mirā Torikku), allows her to travel between mirrors and control others' reflections.^{[ch. 144, 145]} She is voiced by Ayumi Mano in Japanese.

==== Ijuna ====
Voiced by: Hisako Kanemoto

Ijuna (イジューナ, Ijūna) is Shura's secretary and a former Oasis member whose Ether Gear, "Red Destiny" (レッドデスティニー, Reddo Desutinī), creates red strings that influence others' love and hatred for each other.^{[ch. 157]} She develops Stockholm syndrome for Shura after suffering numerous tortures and humiliations under his captivity,^{[ch. 158]} leading her Ether Gear to romantically attach her to Shura when he unknowingly falls in love with her himself.^{[ch. 159, 166]} Despite being freed by Laguna Husert, she remains devoted to Shura and dies with him in Nero 66's destruction.^{[ch. 166]} She appears again in Universe Zero, where she is Shura's fiancée following a healthier relationship.^{[ch. 238, 240]} Mashima included the character as the overall winner of the "original Ether Gear" contest on Twitter.

=== Other characters ===
==== Mother ====
Voiced by: Kikuko Inoue (Japanese); Colleen Clinkenbeard (English)

Mother (マザー, Mazā) is the creator of the Grand Shiki Cosmos,^{[ch. 48]} worshiped by space explorers as a mythical goddess of the cosmos.^{[ch. 3, 4]} She is depicted as a gargantuan woman larger than any planet,^{[ch. 3]} and is capable of granting any wish to those who find her.^{[ch. 48]} Shiki makes it his objective to prove her existence when he is disbelieved for his familiarity with her,^{[ch. 3]} while the Edens One seeks to ensure her death, which guarantees the extinction of humankind in the future of every parallel universe.^{[ch. 204, 218]} Upon being found, Mother reveals herself as the Overdrive state of planet Earth, Shiki's homeworld, transformed to replenish its Ether after constant warfare and deforestation led to the planet's ruin twenty-thousand years earlier in 2025.^{[ch. 272, 273]} Shiki saves her in Universe Zero by using the Chronophage to return her to her planetary form, allowing Earth to be revitalized with the Grand Shiki Cosmos' advanced technology.^{[ch. 289, 292]}

==== Xiaomei ====
Voiced by: Honoka Inoue (Japanese); Jenny Yokobori (English)

Xiaomei (シャオメイ, Shaomei) is the series' metafictional narrator, who breaks the fourth wall to provide context and meta-commentary to the story.^{[ch. 5]} She appears within the story itself as the "Time Oracle" (時読み, Tokiyomi; lit. "Time-reading"), a resident of the rogue planet Mildian with powers of omniscience granted to her by Mother, whose location is the only thing outside of Xiaomei's knowledge.^{[ch. 48]} To avoid boring herself with complete knowledge of the future, she limits her power so that she cannot know the outcome of any battles beyond multiple possibilities.^{[ch. 45]} She is eventually revealed to be the personification of Earth's Moon named Luna (ルナ, Runa),^{[ch. 263, 283]} and returns to her original form after Mother's own form as Earth is restored.^{[ch. 289]} Mashima noted that he had to be careful adding Xiaomei into the main storyline due to her conceived role as an omniscient narrator, but found that because she "knows everything in the entire world", he was able to include her "without too much trouble".^{[vol. 6]}

==== Chronophage ====
The Chronophage (時食み, Tokihami; lit. "Time-devouring") is a space monster that consumes the time of planets and reverts them to earlier points in history, for which it is described as a great cosmic evil.^{[ch. 11]} Its true nature is the bodiless form of Rebecca Bluegarden from Ziggy's timeline,^{[ch. 290]} where she is sent 20,000 years into the future by a spacetime distortion caused by her and Shiki Granbell during the Aoi War.^{[ch. 204]} Her extracted time Ether is the source of Etherion, the Edens Zero's time travel function.^{[ch. 205]} The Chronophage's identity is revealed after Shiki battles the creature's "heart", an amnesiac woman searching for her stolen "time".^{[ch. 283, 287]} This leads her to possess her present day self's body until Shiki reminds her of her past, causing her to vanish peacefully.^{[ch. 290, 291]}

==== Madame Kurenai ====
Voiced by: Mie Sonozaki (Japanese); Michelle Ruff (English)

Madame Kurenai (紅婦人, Kurenai Fujin; lit. "Crimson Lady") is the moniker of Kurenai Kôgetsu (クレナイ・コウゲツ, Kurenai Kōgetsu), Homura's mother from Oedo.^{[ch. 57]} She first appears as the tyrannical ruler of the mining planet Sun Jewel who uses Satellite Blaze (サテライトブレイズ, Sateraito Bureizu), a laser satellite, to execute criminals or teleport them to the labor district as slave workers.^{[ch. 50, 51]} Prior to rising to power, she is enslaved for amassing debt at the casinos before being freed by Valkyrie Yuna, from whom Kurenai hides her selfish and greedy nature, allowing her to marry and assassinate the planet's previous ruler while betraying Valkyrie to her death.^{[ch. 58, 59]} Kurenai is rejected by Homura after being deposed in the laborers' uprising, leaving her to be captured by a vengeful man whom she previously disfigured.^{[ch. 67]} She dies after a year in captivity, with Ziggy using her preserved body's Ether to locate Mother.^{[ch. 199, 200]} In Universe Zero, a heroic version of Kurenai befriends Valkyrie and leads a defense force that protects Sun Jewel.^{[ch. 232-234]}

Mashima named the character after the Japanese word for "crimson" (紅, kurenai) in response to Homura's name, meaning "flame", as he associated both names with fire and the color red. He admitted that he did not remember the inspiration for adding "Madame" (婦人, Fujin) to her title.^{[vol. 7]}

==== Element 4 ====
The Element 4 (エレメント4, Eremento Fō) are Drakken Joe's special forces team who maintain his Ether's balance due to his unnaturally advanced age, with each member using Ether Gear with power over one of the classical elements.^{[ch. 72, 110]} Laguna Husert and Kleene Rutherford first appear as members of the team, representing water and wind, respectively;^{[ch. 72, 75]} in Universe Zero, Laguna's position is filled by Poseidon Nero.^{[ch. 226]}

- Fie (ファイ, Fai) is a long-range sniper who represents fire.^{[ch. 75]} His Ether Gear, "Flame Ammo" (フレイム・アンモ, Fureimu Anmo), allows him to ignite his bullets, manipulate flames, and transform into fire and smoke.^{[ch. 76, 89]} He is voiced by Toshiki Masuda in Japanese.
- Daichi (ダイチ) is an alien and torture addict who represents earth.^{[ch. 79]} He uses the Ether Gear "Pain's Tree" (ペインズ・ツリー, Peinzu Tsurī) to inflict torture on others by growing roots and branches inside their bodies.^{[ch. 80, 90]} He is voiced by Atsushi Imaruoka in Japanese.

==== Xenolith ====
Voiced by: Kazuhiko Inoue

Xenolith (ゼノリス, Zenorisu) is Ziggy's mentor and the founder of the Magimech School of Gravity Martial Arts (魔械流重術, Makai-ryū Jūjutsu), a set of techniques performed by Satan Gravity users. His prowess allows him to control gravity in conceptual senses, such as "lightening" others' pain and causing their thoughts to "fall" into him.^{[ch. 112, 125]} Previously a human member of the Heavenly Knights of the Dancing Sakura (桜舞星騎士団, Ōbu Seikishidan), a historic group stated to have guarded the Sakura Cosmos during the universe's Dark Ages,^{[ch. 29]} Xenolith has since transferred his mind into a robotic body to survive one thousand years after his death.^{[ch. 126]} In Universe Zero, Müller steals Xenolith's powers to create a replica of him for the Oración Seis Galáctica, forcing Xenolith to inhabit the body of a small helper robot to survive.^{[ch. 236-239]}

== Reception ==
In her review of the manga's first volume for Anime News Network (ANN), Amy McNulty praised the trio of Shiki, Rebecca, and Happy, noting that "Rebecca, who initially comes across as vapid, reveals some depth by volume's end", and that Happy "rounds out the trio nicely, though the manga could use more of his humorous commentary throughout to add more levity." ANN's Faye Hopper described Shiki as "more Tarzan than Luffy", feeling that his unambitious goal of exploring the universe and making friends helped enrich the story, though she added that his act of groping Rebecca "really does a number on [Shiki's] likability". In contrast, ANN's Teresa Navarro found Shiki to be archetypal of other shōnen protagonists. Twinfinite's Carlton McGrone praised the characters' designs for being "meticulously sketched and detailed". In a review of the first twelve episodes of the anime, John Serba from Decider considered Shiki and Rebecca to be "very thin characters—naif and non-naif, possibly both quite airheaded—in sincere need of substantial development", and criticized the vague establishment of their goals, but determined them to be "blank slates just [ripe] for whatever the universe throws at them". ANN's MrAJCosplay commented on the series' villains, opining that Mashima's decision to have the series' villains represent "the worst humanity has to offer" was a "double-edged sword"; he considered the majority of villains to be "boring" for their overly simplistic motivations, but noted exceptions such as the "fun sub-villain" Spider, and commented on the setup for Drakken Joe as "[leaning] into a balance of interesting and despicable".

Several reviews for Edens Zero have commented on the characters' similar designs and personalities to those from Hiro Mashima's previous manga Fairy Tail, with comparisons to Natsu Dragneel and Lucy Heartfilia being drawn from Shiki and Rebecca, respectively, while acknowledging that the similarities between characters such as Elsie Crimson and Erza Scarlet, as well as both series' versions of Happy, are intentional. Early online commenters have also likened Shiki's design to that of a "child" of Natsu and Gray Fullbuster. Multiple reviewers felt the tie-ins to Fairy Tail suggested potentially deeper connections between both series. Rebecca Silverman from ANN considered Shiki and Rebecca to be distinct characters from Natsu and Lucy, calling the former "a lot more aware of girls", and the latter "more cautious in her relationships". Ian Wolf from Anime UK News criticized the manga's lack of original designs compared to Fairy Tail, but felt that the similarities would help readers accept the "weirder aspects of the story".
