= Scum's Wish (TV series) =

Television drama series based on the manga series of the same name

- Genre: Romantic drama Drama
- Based on: Scum's Wish by: Mengo Yokoyari
- Written by: Yoshihiro Izumi
- Directed by: Shogo Miyaki; Shunsuke Shinada
- Starring: Miyu Yoshimoto; Dori Sakurada; Sarii Ikegami
- Music by: Yui Koichi
- Country of origin: Japan
- Original language: Japanese
- No. of episodes: 12

Production
- Running time: 24 min

Original release
- Network: Fuji TV
- Release: January 18 – April 5, 2017

Scum's Wish (Japanese: クズの本懐 Kuzu no Honkai) is a Japanese television drama series based on the manga series of the same name by Mengo Yokoyari. The drama premiered on Fuji TV on January 18, 2017.

== Plot ==
Hanabi Yasuraoka (Miyu Yoshimoto) and Mugi Awaya (Dori Sakurada) look an ideal high school couple, but, they both like someone else. Hanabi Yasuraoka has liked Narumi Kanai (Kouki Mizuta) since she was a kid and Mugi Awaya likes his private tutor Akane Minagawa (Rina Aizawa).

As a couple, Hanabi Yasuraoka and Mugi Awayai have 3 conditions: they are not supposed to like each other, they will break up if either of them succeed in love with their secret crush and they will fulfill their physical desires.

== Cast ==
- Miyu Yoshimoto as Hanabi Yasuraoka
- Dori Sakurada as Mugi Awaya
- Sarii Ikegami as Sanae Ebato
- Kouki Mizuta as Narumi Kanai
- Rina Aizawa as Akane Minagawa
- Hiroki Ino as Takuya
- Shiori Yoshida as Mei
- Shiho as Moka Kamomebata
- Misato Kawauchi as Misato
- Momo Ogata

== Production ==
=== Development ===
A live-action TV series adaptation was announced in December 2016.

=== Writing ===
Ere Hagiwara and Motoko Takahashi were both hired to write the script

=== Casting ===
It was announced Miyu Yoshimoto was cast as Hanabi Yasuraoka and Dōri Sakurada has been cast as Mugi Awaya.

== Release ==
The series was released on January 18, 2017.
