= Edens Zero season 1 =

Season of television series

Edens Zero
- Season 1
- Cover art for the first home media volume of the season, featuring Shiki Granbell
- No. of episodes: 25

Release
- Original network: NNS (Nippon TV)
- Original release: April 11 – October 3, 2021

Season chronology
- Next → Season 2

The first season of the Edens Zero anime television series was announced on Twitter by Hiro Mashima on June 12, 2020. It is produced by J.C.Staff and directed by Yūji Suzuki, who died on September 9, 2021, before its broadcast ended. Shinji Ishihira served as chief director, with Mitsutaka Hirota overseeing scripts, Yurika Sako designing the characters, and Yoshihisa Hirano composing the music. Covering the first eight volumes (chapters 1–68) of Mashima's original manga series of the same name, the plot follows Shiki Granbell, a boy with gravity powers who inherits the titular spaceship from his adoptive grandfather, the mechanical "Demon King" Ziggy, and assembles its crew in search of a cosmic goddess known as Mother.

The season aired on Nippon Television and other channels from April 11 to October 3, 2021, (Note: The series premiered on April 10, 2021 at 24:55 (effectively, April 11 at 12:55 a.m. JST).) and was released on DVD and Blu-ray in eight compilations by Aniplex between August 4, 2021, and March 2, 2022. Netflix acquired streaming rights to the season, globally releasing the first twelve episodes outside Japan on August 26, 2021, and the remaining thirteen episodes on November 24 the same year.

For the first twelve episodes, the opening theme is "Eden through the rough" by Takanori Nishikawa, and the ending theme is "Bōken no Vlog" (冒険のVLOG; lit. 'A Vlog of the Journey') by Chico with HoneyWorks. For the remainder of the season, the opening theme is "Forever" by L'Arc-en-Ciel, and the ending theme is "Sekai no Himitsu" (世界の秘密; lit. 'Secret of the World') by Sayuri.

== Episodes ==
No. overall	No. in season	Title (Note: All English titles are taken from Netflix.)	Directed by	Written by	Storyboarded by	Original release date
1	1	"Into the Sky Where Cherry Blossoms Flutter"; Transliteration: "Sakura Mau Sora ni" (Japanese: 桜舞うソラに)	Katsushi Sakurabi	Mitsutaka Hirota	Shinji Ishihira	April 11, 2021 (Note: Episodes 1 and 2 were pre-screened on March 29, 2021.)
A human boy named Shiki is raised from infancy by robots at the Granbell Kingdom, an abandoned theme park on a remote island. Years after the death of Ziggy, the "Demon King" robot who adopted Shiki, the travelers Rebecca Bluegarden and Happy come to record online B-Cube videos of the park. Shiki frightens Rebecca with his attempts at befriending her, but she warms to him upon witnessing his friendship with the other robots. The next morning, the robots become aggressive towards Shiki and Rebecca, seemingly influenced by a virus to rebel against humans. When Rebecca cries in sympathy for Shiki, he uses Ziggy's gravity Ether Gear ability against the robots to rescue her, earning her friendship. Rebecca and Happy help him escape on their spaceship, the Aqua Wing, revealing themselves to be from another planet in the Sakura Cosmos. The robots break down from old age shortly afterwards, having staged their infection to save Shiki from solitude on planet Granbell.
2	2	"A Girl and Her Blue Cat"; Transliteration: "Shōjo to Ao Neko" (Japanese: 少女と青猫)	Yoshihiro Mori	Mitsutaka Hirota	Yūji Suzuki	April 18, 2021
Rebecca and Happy take Shiki to the planet Blue Garden to register him into Shooting Starlight, an adventurers' guild. There Shiki recognizes a hologram of Mother, a cosmic entity who is regarded as a mythical goddess that exists beyond the Sakura Cosmos. The guild members do not believe him when he feels he claims to have seen Mother despite remembering nothing beyond his life on Granbell. After Rebecca takes Shiki outside in embarrassment, Happy is captured by a street gang member. While Shiki battles the gang, Happy is freed and transforms into a pair of blasters that Rebecca uses to defeat the gang's leader, revealing that Happy was given a mechanical body to survive a traffic accident from Rebecca's childhood. Meanwhile, the space pirate Elsie Crimson learns of Shiki's departure from Granbell and prepares to visit Blue Garden.
3	3	"Adventurers"; Transliteration: "Bōkensha-tachi" (Japanese: 冒険者たち)	Tsuneo Tominaga	Mitsutaka Hirota	Toshinori Watanabe	April 25, 2021
Shiki continues to face ridicule at Shooting Starlight, while Rebecca is treated similarly by her guildmate Labilia Christy, a more popular B-Cuber. Disillusioned with the guild after defending Rebecca, Shiki proposes that he and his friends find Mother and record a video to prove her existence. The three travel to planet Norma to obtain a more spaceworthy ship from Professor Weisz Steiner, Rebecca and Happy's benefactor. They are missed by Elsie, who recognizes Norma as a dead planet. Upon arriving in Weisz's house, the three are held at gunpoint by an unfamiliar young man who introduces himself as Weisz. Twenty-thousand years in the future, two androids discover a pair of human remains on a barren world along with Rebecca's recording device, which is inscribed with the words "Edens Zero".
4	4	"A Man Named Weisz"; Transliteration: "Waizu to Iu Otoko" (Japanese: ワイズという男)	Kazuma Satō	Mitsutaka Hirota	Shinji Ishihira	May 2, 2021
At Weisz's house, the stranger escapes from an ambush arranged by the crime boss Sibir, from whom the stranger has stolen a briefcase. Rebecca deduces that her group has traveled fifty years back in time, and that the stranger is Weisz's past self. After encountering Weisz again while hiding from Sibir, Shiki accidentally opens the briefcase and finds a small android inside named E.M. Pino, whose electromagnetic pulse disables machinery and Ether Gear. Pino identifies Sibir as her master and fearfully returns to him, leaving behind a B-Cube recording of Sibir mistreating her and erasing her memory of her previous master. Learning from her briefcase's maintenance log that she comes from the present era, Shiki and his friends agree to rescue her and stop Sibir from altering history with her technology.
5	5	"Clash!! The Sibir Family"; Transliteration: "Gekitotsu!! Shibiru Famirī" (Japanese: 激突!!シビルファミリー)	Katsushi Sakurabi	Mitsutaka Hirota	Yūji Suzuki	May 9, 2021
Shiki's group arrives at Sibir's factory base to rescue Pino, but Weisz takes her for himself and hijacks their motorcycle to escape. Sibir attacks Shiki with a hydraulic press before chasing after Weisz with his Knight Gear. Shiki survives and is sent falling into the factory basement, where he witnesses the death of a robot resembling his friend Michael from Granbell amidst countless other identical robots that Sibir has tortured and discarded. Shiki is enraged by Sibir's cruelty towards robots and defeats him, which inspires Pino to disable the Knight Gear's self-destruct mechanism when Sibir's bird companion activates it, saving Shiki and reciprocating his friendship.
6	6	"The Skull Fairy"; Transliteration: "Sukaru Fearī-gō" (Japanese: スカルフェアリー号)	Tsuneo Tominaga	Mitsutaka Hirota	Toshinori Watanabe	May 16, 2021
Shiki's group takes Pino to have her memory repaired by the present-day Weisz, believing him to be her original master. They attempt to leave Norma, but the Aqua Wing is blocked by an energy field surrounding the planet. Weisz, who has stowed aboard the Aqua Wing to evade the police, helps them bypass the field by using his "Machina Maker" Ether Gear to upgrade the ship. The group is contacted by the present-day Weisz, who reveals Pino's master to be Ziggy. He further explains that the group did not travel to the past, but entered an alternate history created by the Chronophage, a time-eating space monster that reversed fifty years of Norma's time, making himself and the young Weisz separate individuals. The Aqua Wing is suddenly captured by Elsie and brought aboard her ship, the Skull Fairy. Shiki challenges Elsie over the ownership of the Skull Fairy, which is infested with alien parasites mimicking human forms. Upon reaching the ship's bridge, Shiki is startled to see a skull-faced Elsie.
7	7	"Warship of the Demon King"; Transliteration: "Maō Senkan" (Japanese: 魔王戦艦)	Yoshihiro Mori	Mitsutaka Hirota	Shinji Ishihira	May 23, 2021
After a struggle with Elsie, Shiki enters a new form and overpowers her upon learning of Ziggy's failure to find Mother, which gives him the resolve to achieve Ziggy's dream. Elsie suddenly changes into a small alien creature, revealed to be a parasite mimicking her. The real Elsie congratulates Shiki from her nearby fleet and rewards him with the Skull Fairy, having been entrusted by Ziggy to deliver it to Shiki from the beginning. Engaged in a battle with the Interstellar Union Army, Elsie provides cover for Shiki's group as Weisz activates the ship's warp drive and sends them near Blue Garden. The group cleans and explores the ship, during which time Rebecca finds a bath that grants her powers similar to Ether Gear. In Ziggy's chamber, Shiki unwittingly activates an android named Witch Regret, who reverts the ship to its original form, the warship Edens Zero.
8	8	"Wind Howls on the Highway"; Transliteration: "Kaze no Naku Haiwei" (Japanese: 風の鳴くハイウェイ)	Kazuma Satō	Mitsutaka Hirota	Yūji Suzuki	May 30, 2021
Witch advises Shiki's group to gather her fellow androids, the Demon King's Four Shining Stars, to ensure Edens Zero's passage through Dragonfall, a dragon swarm which borders the Sakura Cosmos. After Weisz leaves to indulge in the present era, Shiki's group visits Shooting Starlight to investigate Sister Ivry, one of the missing androids. While Rebecca attends a meeting with the guild master, Shiki saves Labilia from being abducted by Jinn, a cyborg and wind Ether Gear user who works for Sister. Shiki and Jinn battle each other until Jinn receives orders to retreat, inviting Shiki to a rematch on the lawless planet Guilst. Later, Shiki finds Happy damaged from an assault on Rebecca, who has gone missing, followed by a news report about several B-Cuber abductions. Realizing Jinn's involvement, Shiki's group prepares to disembark to Guilst, overheard by a kimono-wearing girl who is familiar with Edens Zero.
9	9	"Planet Guilst"; Transliteration: "Wakusei Girusuto" (Japanese: 惑星ギルスト)	Kiyoshi Murayama	Mitsutaka Hirota	Toshinori Watanabe	June 6, 2021 (Note: This episode aired at 1:00 a.m. JST, 5 minutes after the original air time on Nippon TV.)
Rebecca and the other captured B-Cubers are delivered to Guilst by Rogue Out, Sister's mercenary squad. Rogue Out's patron Illega, a collector of petrified women, prepares the B-Cubers for petrification by flooding their cell with a foam that dissolves their clothing. Meanwhile, Weisz returns to Edens Zero with the kimono-wearing girl, Homura Kōgetsu, with whom he has made a deal to grant her access to the ship after learning of Rebecca's abduction. Homura offers to help rescue Rebecca in exchange for the opportunity to duel Shiki, revealing herself to possess an Ether Gear that Witch recognizes. Shiki's team reaches Rogue Out's headquarters, where they are confronted by Sister.
10	10	"The Great Naked Escape"; Transliteration: "Hadaka no Dasshutsu Sakusen" (Japanese: 裸の脱出作戦)	Yoshiaki Iwasaki	Mitsutaka Hirota	Shinji Ishihira	June 13, 2021
Homura uses her "Soul Blade" Ether Gear to defeat Sister's soldiers, allowing Shiki and Pino to stow beneath Sister's ship as she disembarks to Illega's tower. Weisz becomes wary of Homura's power and threatens her by shooting Mosco Versa-0, an intervening Rogue Out member, with a battery of turrets. Meanwhile, Rebecca rallies the other B-Cubers to form a human pyramid and help her reach their cell's elevated glass window, using the clothes-dissolving foam to melt the window and escape. Illega corners Rebecca, but Shiki finds them and violently assails Illega. Pino calms Shiki by using her EMP to deactivate his Ether Gear, which unlocks the B-Cubers' cell. Jinn locates Shiki, who fends him off as Pino leads the B-Cubers to safety. Aboard Edens Zero, Witch detects the Chronophage approaching Guilst.
11	11	"Sister Ivry"; Transliteration: "Shisutā Ivurii" (Japanese: シスター・イヴリィ)	Yoshihiro Mori	Megumu Sasano	Shinji Ishihira	June 20, 2021
Jinn is approached by Sister and her minion Ganoff during his battle with Shiki, who challenges all three at once. As this happens, Homura finds a different android named Sister captive beneath Rogue Out's headquarters and convinces Weisz to release the android. After Shiki defeats Rogue Out, the second Sister exposes their leader as an imposter who kept her imprisoned for ten years to harness her healing powers. Sister revives Illega's petrified victims before joining Shiki's group to escape from the Chronophage. Jinn kills the imposter, accusing her of falsely promising to save his younger sister, Kleene. Meanwhile, Rebecca defeats Illega to rescue a B-Cuber who had fallen behind during their escape. Rebecca allows the revived girls to evacuate while she waits for Shiki, with ten minutes remaining until the Chronophage's arrival.
12	12	"New Friends"; Transliteration: "Arata na Nakama-tachi" (Japanese: 新たな仲間たち)	Hiroaki Takagi	Mitsutaka Hirota	Toshinori Watanabe	June 27, 2021 (Note: This episode aired at 1:10 a.m. JST, 15 minutes after the original air time on Nippon TV.)
Shiki reunites with Rebecca and Pino in the chaos surrounding the Chronophage's approach, using his gravity to drop his group directly onto Edens Zero to escape. The Chronophage consumes 1,200 years of Guilst's time, killing most of the planet's population while restoring its pristine nature; among those who escape is Drakken Joe of the Oración Seis Galáctica, a group of six intergalactic outlaws. Aboard Edens Zero, Homura reveals herself to be a pupil of Valkyrie Yuna, one of the missing Shining Stars. Homura and Weisz are accepted as permanent crew members, as is a reprogrammed Mosco, who is revealed to be from the ship's original crew. Following Sister's intuition, the crew visit the monument Iron Hill orbiting Blue Garden, where they immediately find Hermit Mio, another of the Four Shining Stars.
13	13	"The Super Virtual Planet"; Transliteration: "Chōkasō Wakusei" (Japanese: 超仮想惑星)	Katsushi Sakurabi	Mitsutaka Hirota	Yūji Suzuki	July 4, 2021 (Note: This episode aired at 1:05 a.m. JST, 10 minutes after the original air time on Nippon TV.)
The Edens Zero crew learn that Hermit is in a catatonic state caused by psychological trauma. Witch determines that Hermit's mind is secluded within Digitalis, a virtual planet and server for the massively multiplayer online role-playing game Rogue Fantasia. Shiki's team enters the game by uploading their consciousness into digital avatars, warned by Witch that any injuries and death sustained in the virtual world will affect their physical bodies. After interrogating the game's sentient NPCs, the team travels to the city near Hermit's location and encounters Jamilov, a player and affiliate of Drakken Joe who is notorious for killing NPCs and other players without being banned from the game.
14	14	"The Girl on the Hill"; Transliteration: "Oka no Ue no Shōjo" (Japanese: 丘の上の少女)	Kiyotaka Ōhata	Megumu Sasano	Kiyotaka Ōhata	July 11, 2021
After Jamilov logs out to attend a meeting with Drakken, Shiki's team reaches Hermit and tries persuading her to return to Edens Zero, but she sends them away out of hatred for humans. Returning to the city, the team witnesses an oncoming siege of enemy monsters that have been reprogrammed by Jamilov to kill the surviving NPCs. Shiki rescues Hermit from the monsters while his teammates help protect the city. Meanwhile, Homura appears to betray the Edens Zero crew by allying with Jamilov, intent on joining Drakken's ranks. As Homura openly reveals her intentions to the team, a second Homura arrives and saves Shiki from being killed by the monster army.
15	15	"Great Kaiju Shiki"; Transliteration: "Daikaijū Shiki" (Japanese: 大怪獣シキ)	Yoshihiro Mori	Mitsutaka Hirota	Toshinori Watanabe	July 18, 2021 (Note: This episode aired at 1:35 a.m. JST, 40 minutes after the original air time on Nippon TV.)
The traitor Homura unmasks herself as Amira, a shapeshifting government agent who is investigating Drakken, and flees after failing to kill the real Homura. Finding that Jamilov is using cheats to gain advantages over Shiki, Hermit begrudgingly helps Shiki fight through her own cheats, using the willing Weisz's account to avoid being banned. Driven to frustration, Jamilov enters a computer code that begins deleting the game world and characters. Hermit is initially indifferent towards the NPCs, but is swayed into undoing the code when Shiki declares them to be living beings. After Shiki defeats Jamilov, Hermit agrees to temporarily exit the game, but continues to isolate herself. Edens Zero's computer systems are then hacked by Jamilov's real-world persona, Spider, who gains full control over the ship.
16	16	"Fireworks"; Transliteration: "Hanabi" (Japanese: 花火)	Kazuma Satō	Mitsutaka Hirota	Shinji Ishihira	July 25, 2021
As Spider destroys Edens Zero from within, Hermit tells the crew to evacuate without her, reflecting on the incident that disillusioned her from humans. Fifteen years in the past, Hermit assists the human Dr. Müller in developing a machine to provide energy to the dying robot planet Hook, hoping to befriend humans. To her horror, the machine obliterates Hook and the robot scientists stationed there while Müller and his human colleagues celebrate, revealing they engineered the disaster out of contempt towards robots. Müller conducts torturous experiments on Hermit for the next two years until he and his team are arrested, leaving Hermit traumatized. Back in the present, the crew refuses to abandon Hermit against her objections, leading her to realize that she still desires friendship with humans. Assured by Shiki, Hermit restores the ship's systems and humiliates Spider with a prank missile attack, returning to her old, cheerful self.
17	17	"The Temple of Knowledge"; Transliteration: "Chishiki no Kyūden" (Japanese: 知識の宮殿)	Yoshiyuki Nogami	Megumu Sasano	Kiyoko Sayama	August 1, 2021
Spider seeks for Drakken to retaliate against the Edens Zero crew, but Drakken has him executed for his incompetence. Believing he can profit off of Edens Zero, Drakken contacts Shooting Starlight's master, Noah Glenfield, for information on the ship. Meanwhile, suspecting Noah to be involved with Rebecca's abduction in the events surrounding Guilst, the crew travel to consult an omniscient fortune-teller on the planet Mildian over Valkyrie's whereabouts, spending the voyage modeling costumes in the ship's dress factory as part of Weisz's deal with Homura. They then meet the fortune-teller, Xiaomei, who sends Shiki's team to a battle coliseum within her temple to compensate for her knowledge.
18	18	"Words Will Give You Strength"; Transliteration: "Kotoba wa Tsuyosa o Ataeru" (Japanese: 言葉は強さを与える)	Tsuneo Tominaga	Mitsutaka Hirota	Toshinori Watanabe	August 8, 2021 (Note: This episode aired at 2:00 a.m. JST, an hour and 5 minutes after the original air time on Nippon TV.)
Xiaomei challenges Shiki's group to a series of duels to indulge her obsession with battles, as she has restricted her powers to avoid foreseeing their outcomes. Shiki immediately defeats the first opponent, a metallic warrior, with a single punch; Rebecca wins the second match against a B-Cuber, easily bypassing his bullet-resistant force field with an ordinary kick; and Weisz exploits a loophole in the rules to use Pino's EMP against the third opponent, an Ether Gear user with superhuman speed. For the final match, Homura is pitted against a supposed replica of Valkyrie, whom she discovers to actually be a training robot programmed by Xiaomei to act the part after defeating her. Satisfied, Xiaomei reveals the real Valkyrie to be on the planet Sun Jewel and warns the crew of future confrontations against others who seek Mother.
19	19	"From the Planet of Eternity"; Transliteration: "Eiei Mukyū no Hoshi yori" (Japanese: 永永無窮の星より)	Yoshiaki Iwasaki	Mitsutaka Hirota	Shinji Ishihira	August 15, 2021
The crew anticipate a three-day voyage to Sun Jewel to avoid a hazardous debris field near the planet. En route, they rescue a shipwrecked space captain named Connor from a passing school of fish in space. Connor exhausts the crew's hospitality with his intrusive behavior and poor manners, but when the crew confront him for unauthorized piloting of the ship, they find that he has safely brought them to Sun Jewel through the debris field within the first day of the voyage; he remains aboard the ship, withholding the name of his original ship, Edens One. Weisz remains behind to construct a new weapon while Shiki's group investigates Sun Jewel, where Shiki and Homura thwart a casino robbery. Madame Kurenai, the planet's ruler and an associate of Drakken, publicly executes the robbers with a laser-mounted satellite called Satellite Blaze. For their use of violence against the robbers, Shiki and Homura are branded as criminals by Kurenai's emissaries, who fire the same laser on them.
20	20	"Stones"; Transliteration: "Sutōnzu" (Japanese: 鉱石生命体(ストーンズ))	Yoshihiro Mori	Megumu Sasano	Yūji Suzuki	August 29, 2021
Shiki and Homura are transported to Sun Jewel's labor district, where they are sentenced to harvest precious metals from alien monsters called Stones alongside the planet's impoverished citizens. The two run afoul of Garrot, the district's cruel warden, who lashes Homura with his paralyzing whip and takes her away. Ignoring Garrot's threats against the other laborers, Shiki confronts him to rescue Homura. In the rich sector, Labilia offers to help Rebecca's group enter the labor district in exchange for a B-Cube collaboration as repayment for Shiki rescuing her from Jinn. However, the video is revealed to be a malicious prank on Rebecca, and Labilia reneges her promise after publicly humiliating her. Rebecca gains the sympathy of Nino, a fellow B-Cuber in the video's audience, who offers to guide her to the labor district himself.
21	21	"Reset"; Transliteration: "Risetto" (Japanese: リセット)	Kiyoshi Murayama	Mitsutaka Hirota	Toshinori Watanabe	September 5, 2021
Nino reveals himself to be a benign agent of Madame Kurenai and allows Rebecca's group to access the labor district. The group meets Paul, a disciple of Valkyrie with a B-Cube that contains the truth of her circumstances. Meanwhile, Garrot transports Shiki and Homura to the den of Black Rock, Sun Jewel's most powerful and valuable Stone, where they reunite with Rebecca's group. The group defeats Black Rock and fulfills the quotas displayed on Shiki and Homura's slave collars, expecting this to free them, but the quotas immediately reset to their original values. Convinced of Homura's resolve, Paul removes the collars with his thievery Ether Gear and gives her the B-Cube. In the rich sector, having decided to double-cross Drakken by claiming Edens Zero for herself, Kurenai readies her satellite to eradicate the labor district.
22	22	"My Mother, the Machine"; Transliteration: "Kikai no Haha" (Japanese: 機械の母)	Kazuma Satō	Mitsutaka Hirota	Shinji Ishihira	September 12, 2021
Homura finishes watching the video on Valkyrie's B-Cube and runs to her in distress. Ten years in the past, Valkyrie raises an orphaned Homura on the planet Oedo, where they face disapproval from natives who are prejudiced against machines. Five years into her training, Homura is reprimanded by a local magistrate when she attacks his son for insulting Valkyrie. The magistrate convinces Valkyrie that Homura needs her biological mother, who is revealed to be Kurenai. Finding Kurenai enslaved in debt at Sun Jewel's labor district, Valkyrie takes her place so that Kurenai may reunite with Homura. Two years later, Valkyrie learns that Kurenai has instead usurped Sun Jewel's previous ruler, having never intended to return to Homura. After Kurenai provokes a horde of Stones into attacking the district, Valkyrie slays the horde to defend the other laborers, but perishes. Back in the present, Homura finds her teacher's remains and is devastated when Pino confirms that Valkyrie is beyond repair. Shiki consoles Homura and leaves her to grieve while he confronts Kurenai, resolving to bring her to Homura for judgement in Valkyrie's stead.
23	23	"Until the Day It Turns to Strength"; Transliteration: "Itsuka Tsuyosa ni Kawaru Made" (Japanese: いつか強さに変わるまで)	Yūji Suzuki, Yūsuke Onoda	Megumu Sasano	Toshinori Watanabe	September 19, 2021
Drakken steals the Satellite Blaze as retribution for Kurenai's betrayal and prepares to seize Edens Zero in combat. Kurenai sends Garrot, a reluctant Nino, and their companion Baku to attack the labor district while she battles Shiki with her Knight Gear, the Kurenai Dragoon. Rebecca tries recruiting Homura to aid the laborers against Kurenai's forces, but decides against it upon finding her still processing Valkyrie's death and offers her own words of encouragement instead. Weisz joins the battle under a superhero alter ego named "Arsenal" with his completed weapon, a mechanical suit that he modifies with his Ether Gear, which he uses to defeat Baku.
24	24	"Taking Up the Torch"; Transliteration: "Ishi o Tsugu Mono" (Japanese: 意志を継ぐ者)	Yūji Suzuki	Megumu Sasano	Yūji Suzuki	September 26, 2021
As Shiki brings his battle with Kurenai into the labor district, Rebecca is forced to fight Nino when he traps her group during a supply run. After Nino defeats Rebecca, she notices several parallels between the crew's battles on Sun Jewel and Mildian, discovering hints that allow her to manifest an Ether Gear in her legs. Her Ether Gear rewinds time to the moment before her defeat, allowing her to subdue Nino; she names her Ether Gear "Leaper" after her newly enhanced speed, unaware of its true power. Meanwhile, Homura notices the laborers' battle and attempts to join her allies, but is paralyzed as a delayed effect from Garrot's earlier lashing. Angered when Garrot desecrates Valkyrie's remains, Homura musters the strength to dislodge Valkyrie's sword with her own energy blades and impale him with it. She recovers and reunites with Rebecca's group afterward, thanking her friends for helping her overcome her grief.
25	25	"Someone to Love"; Transliteration: "Aisuru Mono" (Japanese: 愛する者)	Yūji Suzuki, Yoshiyuki Nogami	Mitsutaka Hirota	Yūji Suzuki, Shinji Ishihira	October 3, 2021
Shiki uses the Kurenai Dragoon's missiles to strengthen his powers and destroy the mech. After Nino deactivates Kurenai's robot army, Shiki and Paul elect Homura to decide Kurenai's fate. Kurenai feigns compassion for Homura to gain her forgiveness, but Homura determines Valkyrie to be her true mother and sends Kurenai into exile; Kurenai is assaulted and taken captive by one of her previous victims shortly afterwards. Shiki's team leaves Valkyrie enshrined on Sun Jewel and returns to Edens Zero, which has evaded Drakken, to inform the crew of Valkyrie's death. Witch and Sister argue over recreating Valkyrie from her backup data, which would result in a different android lacking the original's emotional ties to Homura. Agreeing with Shiki that they must accept their loss, Homura offers herself as Valkyrie's substitute in the Four Shining Stars. The Shining Stars welcome Homura and mourn for Valkyrie before the crew continue on their journey, pursued by Drakken.

== Home media release ==
Region 2 — Japan
Vol.	Episodes	Artwork	Release date	Ref.
Season 1
1	1–3	Shiki Granbell	August 4, 2021	
2	4–6	Rebecca Bluegarden & Happy	September 8, 2021	
3	7–9	Weisz Steiner & E.M. Pino	October 6, 2021	
4	10–12	Homura Kōgetsu	November 3, 2021	
5	13–16	Witch Regret	December 1, 2021	
6	17–19	Sister Ivry & Mosco Versa-0	January 12, 2022	
7	20–22	Hermit Mio	February 2, 2022	
8	23–25	Valkyrie Yuna	March 2, 2022	
