= Sanketsu Shōjo =

Studio album by Sayuri
- Released: August 10, 2022
- Genres: J-pop, rock
- Length: 49:54
- Label: Ariola Japan
- Producers: Eiji Nishikara, Ryo Kato

Sayuri chronology
Me (2020)	Sanketsu Shōjo (2022)

Singles from Sanketsu Shōjo
- 1. "Tsuki to Hanataba" Released: February 28, 2018; 2. "Reimei" Released: December 5, 2018; 3. "Kōkai no Uta" Released: November 27, 2019; 4. "Sekai no Himitsu" Released: September 8, 2021; 5. "Hana no Tō" Released: July 3, 2022

Sanketsu Shōjo (酸欠少女, Hypoxia Girl) is the second and final studio album by Japanese singer-songwriter Sayuri. It was released on August 10, 2022, five years after her previous album, Mikazuki no Koukai. It was Sayuri’s final album released during her lifetime, before her death in 2024.

Several songs featured on this album have been used as opening or ending themes for anime productions.

== Background and production ==
On June 10, 2022, the release of Sayuri's sophomore album was announced for August 10 of the same year under the title Sanketsu Shōjo. The album's tracklist was revealed two weeks after its initial release announcement. Her singles "Tsuki no Hanabata", "Kōkai no Uta" and "Sekai no Himitsu", which were officially released between 2018 and 2022 are featured on the album. Several songs featured on the album have been used for anime productions such as Edens Zero, My Hero Academia, Sing "Yesterday" for Me and Lycoris Recoil. Another song on the album is "Reimei", which was co-produced with Japanese pop punk band My First Story. The co-produced song served as the opening theme song for the second season of the anime television series Golden Kamuy.

All songs except for "Reimei" were written and composed by Sayuri while Shō Tsuchiya and Hiro were cited as co-authors on "Reimei". The album was mastered by Mitsuyasu Abe at Sony Music Studios.

== Releases ==
In November 2017, it was revealed that Sayuri's song "Tsuki to Hanataba" would be used as ending theme song for the anime series Fate/Extra Last Encore. The song was released as a physical single on February 28 the following year. In August 2018, during her appearance at Rock in Japan festival Sayuri announced that the song "Reimei", which was co-created with Japanese rock band My First Story would receive a physical release. In November 2019, Sayuri released the song "Kōkai no Uta", which serves as ending theme song for the fourth season of My Hero Academia anime series.

In April 2020, a music video for the song "Nejiko" was released. The song was featured in a television commercial for Asahi Foods company. The song received a digital single release. In the beginning of 2021, the track "Kamisama" was officially released and used as opening theme for the dorama series Tokyo Kaiki Zake. In September 2021, Sayuri released her song "Sekai no Himitsu". The song served as ending theme song for the anime series Edens Zero.

The album itself was officially announced for an August 10, 2022 release date on June 10, 2022. The album features all singles released between 2018 and 2021 as well as the song "Hana no Tō", which was used as ending theme song for the original anime series Lycoris Recoil. The song was released on streaming platforms on July 3, 2022.

== Commercial performance ==
Sanketsu Shōjo peaked at no. 13 on the Japanese Albums Chart published by Oricon and stayed on the chart for 16 weeks in total. On the Japanese Hot Albums Chart published by Billboard Japan, the album peaked at no. 8 and stayed for a total of ten weeks on the chart.

Her single "Hana no Tō" received a nomination for Ending Theme Song of the Year at the ninth installment of the Anime Trending Awards and was voted into sixth place. "Hana no Tō" won the audience award category and Grand Prix at the Anime Song Awards. The song has been certified Gold by the Recording Industry Association of Japan (RIAJ) for 100,000 digital copies sold and 50 million on-demand streams.

== Track listing ==
All tracks are written by Sayuri, except "Reimei" (co-written and composed by Shō Tsuchiya and Hiro of My First Story).

Sanketsu Shōjo track listing
No.	Title	Length
1.	"Sanketsu Shōjo" (酸欠少女; Hypoxia Girl)	4:08
2.	"Hana no Tō" (花の塔; Flower Tower) (Ending theme from the anime Lycoris Recoil)	4:35
3.	"Kōkai no Uta" (航海の唄; Song about a Voyage)	4:42
4.	"Dawn Dance"	4:24
5.	"Sekai no Himitsu" (世界の秘密; World Secret)	5:48
6.	"Aoibashi" (葵橋; Blue Bridge)	3:50
7.	"Tsuki to Hanataba" (月と花束; Moon and Bouquet)	4:36
8.	"Kamisama" (かみさま; God(s))	4:37
9.	"Summer Bug"	3:30
10.	"Reimei" (レイメイ; Dawn) (featuring My First Story)	5:14
11.	"Nejiko" (ねじこ; Nejiko)	4:30
Total length:		49:54
