= Edens Zero season 2 =

Season of television series

Edens Zero
- Season 2
- Japanese cover art for the first home media box set of the season, featuring Shiki Granbell and the Four Shining Stars (left) faced up against Drakken Joe and the Element 4 (right) with Rebecca Bluegarden in the center
- No. of episodes: 25

Release
- Original network: NNS (Nippon TV)
- Original release: April 2 – October 1, 2023

Season chronology
- ← Previous; Season 1

The second season of the Edens Zero anime television series was confirmed through the franchise's official Twitter account on February 9, 2022. It is produced by J.C.Staff, with Toshinori Watanabe replacing Yūji Suzuki as director following Suzuki's death in September 2021. Returning staff include Shinji Ishihira as chief director, Mitsutaka Hirota as script overseer, Yurika Sako as character designer, and Yoshihisa Hirano as music composer.

Based on Hiro Mashima's manga series of the same name, the season adapts the ninth through sixteenth volumes (chapters 69–140) of the source material, following protagonist Shiki Granbell and the crew of the titular spaceship on their voyage for Mother, the goddess of the cosmos. The first half of the season focuses on the crew's confrontation with the intergalactic crime lord Drakken Joe, while the second half focuses on the sudden resurrection and betrayal of Shiki's grandfather, the robotic Demon King Ziggy, who wages war on humanity.

The second season aired from April 2 to October 1, 2023, on Nippon Television and other networks. Mediatoon Distribution licensed the season for worldwide distribution, with Crunchyroll streaming the series in various regions.

For the first thirteen episodes, the opening theme is "Never say Never" performed by Takanori Nishikawa, while the ending theme is "Rinne" (リンネ; lit. 'Reincarnation Cycle') performed by Asca. For the remainder of the season, the opening theme is "Kaibutsu" (械物; a Japanese portmanteau of kai (械; "machine") and kaibutsu (怪物; "monster")) performed by Tani Yuuki, and the ending theme is "My Star" performed by Lozareena.

== Episodes ==
No. overall	No. in season	Title (Note: All English titles are taken from Crunchyroll.)	Directed by	Written by	Storyboarded by	Original release date (Note: The season premiered on April 1, 2023 at 24:55 (effectively, April 2 at 12:55 a.m. JST).)
26	1	"Belial Gore"; Transliteration: "Beriaru Goa" (Japanese: ベリアル・ゴア)	Yoshiyuki Nogami	Mitsutaka Hirota	Shinji Ishihira	April 2, 2023
Rebecca Bluegarden passes out in Edens Zero's bath, dreaming of a battle against robots where her friend Shiki Granbell is several years older and her companion Happy is dead. Awakening in the ship's infirmary, Rebecca learns that Shiki has led their friends Weisz Steiner, E.M. Pino, and Homura Kôgetsu aboard the space fortress Belial Gore to investigate its leader, Drakken Joe, who has been pursuing their ship. Shiki's team encounters an elderly version of Sibir from the present timeline, where he now works as a bartender. Sibir briefly reconnects with Weisz, his former friend, but inadvertently frightens Pino, who was mistreated by his alternate self. Shortly afterwards, Drakken publicly exposes the team's presence aboard his ship, trapping them and sending three of his operatives—Maria Slime, Seth Anderson, and Diego Reyes—to raid Edens Zero.
27	2	"Element 4"; Transliteration: "Eremento Fō" (Japanese: エレメント4)	Hidehiko Kadota	Mitsutaka Hirota	Takeshi Mori	April 9, 2023
Witch Regret single-handedly defeats Drakken's infiltration team; the androids Seth and Diego self-destruct while Maria is kept for interrogation. In response, Drakken dispatches his special forces, the Element 4, and issues a station-wide manhunt for Shiki's team. The team attempt to disguise themselves with a holographic app invented by Weisz, but they are found by one of the Element 4, Laguna Husert, whose Ether Gear turns people into water when they shed tears. Using various methods to force them to cry, Laguna liquefies most of the team except for Weisz, who uses his app to disguise himself as water before donning his Arsenal suit to fight Laguna.
28	3	"A Wind Blows Through the Sakura Cosmos"; Transliteration: "Sakura Kosumosu ni Fuku Kaze" (Japanese: 桜宇宙(サクラコスモス)に吹く風)	Toshinori Watanabe	Mitsutaka Hirota	Toshinori Watanabe	April 16, 2023
Weisz defeats Laguna with remote assistance from crewmate Hermit Mio, restoring his teammates, but is shot by Fie, the Element 4's fire-using sniper. Sibir helps Shiki's team escape from Fie and shelters them in his bar, where they request medical treatment for Weisz. Due to Sister Ivry's preoccupation with interrogating Maria, Rebecca and Happy are sent to deliver medicine made from Sister's healing Ether. They are intercepted in space by Sylph, the Element 4's wind user, whom Rebecca evades by channeling her "Leaper" Ether Gear's speed into her starfighter. However, Sylph follows them to the Belial Gore's loading dock and immediately traps them inside a wind cage.
29	4	"No. 29"; Transliteration: "Nijūkyū-gō" (Japanese: 29号)	Yoshiyuki Kumeda, Kōichirō Kuroda	Megumu Sasano	Takeshi Mori	April 23, 2023
Rebecca alerts Shiki's team to her capture, leading them to find Weisz's medicine in the loading dock. There they are attacked by Sylph and her assistant, Shiki's rival Jinn, revealing Sylph to be Jinn's sister, Kleene Rutherford. Jinn overpowers Shiki after entering Overdrive, a state of heightened power, while Kleene corners Homura as she escapes with the medicine. Meanwhile, Rebecca is brought before Drakken, who explains that he is pursuing Edens Zero to recruit her based on information betrayed to him by her guild master, Noah Glenfield, addressing Rebecca as "No. 29". As a gesture of goodwill, Drakken shows her a cell containing her injured bully Labilia Christy, horrifying Rebecca. Drakken leaves Rebecca trapped in the cell, which is guarded Daichi, the Element 4's earth user and Labilia's assailant.
30	5	"Intercession"; Transliteration: "Chūsai" (Japanese: 仲裁)	Shigeru Ueda	Mitsutaka Hirota	Shinji Ishihira	April 30, 2023
Laguna liquefies Rebecca to stop Daichi from torturing her with his tree Ether Gear. Homura and Weisz are captured by Kleene and Fie, while Fie kills Sibir for harboring the crew. Shiki enters Overdrive to match Jinn, but Drakken intervenes, stating that neither Shiki's nor Jinn's forms are "true" Overdrives, and uses his alchemy Ether Gear to temporarily turn Shiki into stone. Gathering the team to punish them for their actions, Drakken destroys Weisz's medicine and reveals Happy and Pino have been sold to a junk shop. Rebecca submits herself to Drakken for her friends' safety; as a warning, Drakken has one of Weisz's arms amputated before revealing Edens Zero has been seized by Maria's team, whose android members had faked their earlier destruction. Shiki defiantly promises to defeat Drakken someday, but is fatally shot in the head by Drakken.
31	6	"Our Future"; Transliteration: "Ore-tachi no Mirai" (Japanese: オレたちの未来)	Yoshiyuki Nogami	Mitsutaka Hirota	Shinji Ishihira	May 7, 2023
In the week following Shiki's death, Drakken confines Rebecca to extract her Ether Gear, "Cat Leaper", once it fully activates. When she wishes to see her friends again, her Ether Gear suddenly sends her falling into her infirmary bed aboard Edens Zero, where Shiki and the rest of the crew are unharmed. Rebecca believes the past week to have been a dream until she learns her friends are disembarking to the Belial Gore as they did before. After Rebecca stops them, Hermit reasons that Rebecca has made a time leap to the past with her Ether Gear, which Rebecca proves by finding evidence of Labilia's captivity. Using Rebecca's knowledge of the future, the crew thwarts Maria's infiltration team and directly crashes Edens Zero through the Belial Gore to rescue Labilia. Drakken furiously prepares to kill the Edens Zero crew except for Rebecca, whom he calls "No. 30".
32	7	"4 VS 4"	Hidehiko Kadota	Megumu Sasano	Takeshi Mori	May 14, 2023
The Demon King's Four Shining Stars engage the Element 4 in combat, with Hermit defeating Fie, allowing the rest of the crew to reach Drakken's headquarters. The crew is contacted by a hologram of Noah, who reveals his awareness of Rebecca's time leap through his observational Ether Gear "Eye of God". He reveals that "No. 29" and "No. 30" refer to two of several alternate timelines Rebecca has created since her childhood traffic accident, which subconsciously triggered her power, and that his true intention is to defeat Drakken in the current timeline, World No. 30. Noah further explains that Drakken is allegedly undead and uses a life support machine to maintain his youth, but his transmission signal is lost before he can elaborate on Drakken's weakness.
33	8	"The Sword of Edens"; Transliteration: "Edenzu no Tsurugi" (Japanese: エデンズの剣)	Yoshihiro Mori	Mitsutaka Hirota	Takeshi Mori	May 21, 2023
Sister and Witch defeat Daichi and Laguna, respectively, while Homura negates Kleene's wind Ether Gear by generating her own winds with her Soul Blade. Kleene suffers a nervous breakdown over Drakken "absorbing" her for her failure; her emotions are briefly suppressed by her hair accessories before Homura defeats her. Meanwhile, Shiki's team rescues Labilia, whom Rebecca finds mysteriously unharmed despite appearing to have been tortured for some time in World No. 29. Sibir guides the group to safety, revealing that Drakken has remained young for over 200 years. Rebecca deduces that Drakken wants her Cat Leaper to transfer his mind into his past body because his life support machine is losing its effectiveness. Labilia suddenly decides to assist the crew in defeating Drakken, unveiling herself as an imposter.
34	9	"Shiki vs. Drakken"; Transliteration: "Shiki bāsasu Dorakken" (Japanese: シキ vs ドラッケン)	Yoshiyuki Kumeda, Kōichirō Kuroda	Mitsutaka Hirota	Takeshi Mori	May 28, 2023
Labilia's imposter reveals herself as the shapeshifting Galactic Intelligence Agency agent Amira, who has safely hidden the real Labilia in a wardrobe near where Homura battled Kleene. Drakken uncovers the group to capture Rebecca, but Shiki sends his friends away while he battles Drakken. The group finds Drakken's life support machine guarded by Jinn, who relents when Amira explains that the machine absorbs the life force of everyone around it, including Kleene, potentially killing them. Weisz is enraged by the revelation and storms off against Amira's wishes for him to reverse the machine's effects and weaken Drakken. Hermit offers to reprogram the machine once its security device is destroyed, which Jinn does after Sister agrees to treat Kleene for her mental illness. Meanwhile, Drakken enters Overdrive and nearly turns Shiki into stone, but is interrupted by Weisz, who accuses Drakken of killing someone precious to him.
35	10	"Advent of the Demon King"; Transliteration: "Maō Kōrin" (Japanese: 魔王降臨)	Toshinori Watanabe	Megumu Sasano	Toshinori Watanabe	June 4, 2023 (Note: This episode aired at 1:00 a.m. JST, 5 minutes after the original air time on Nippon TV.)
Weisz reveals his mother to have been a victim of the life-draining machine during Drakken's operation on Norma. Drakken succumbs to his machine's reversal, but is mutated into a tentacled monstrosity that spreads through the building, attempting to absorb Rebecca and activating his superweapon, the Satellite Blaze, to kill Noah for his betrayal. Before Drakken can kill Shiki to trigger Rebecca's power, Shiki's gravity draws in his memories of his final moments in the previous timeline, causing him to achieve a complete Overdrive. Pino's memory is likewise affected, allowing her to forgive Sibir when she recalls his friendship with Weisz. While the Shining Stars destroy the Satellite Blaze with Edens Zero's Star Bringer cannon, Shiki also gains Drakken's childhood memories, witnessing how Drakken's obsession with immortality began as a means of making friends due to his shortened lifespan. Pitying Drakken, Shiki declares himself to be his friend before defeating him.
36	11	"Edens One"	Yūsuke Onada	Mitsutaka Hirota	Shinji Ishihira	June 11, 2023
The effects of Drakken's machine wear off, reverting him into a decrepit old man. Despite Drakken's lack of remorse, Weisz spares him to be arrested by Amira and settles his differences with Sibir. Rebecca notices their passenger Connor's absence and is shocked that her friends have never encountered him in World No. 30. Joined by Jinn and Kleene, the crew travels to planet Blue Garden to meet Noah, who reveals his secret identity as a G.I.A. director to regain their trust, while Labilia begrudgingly thanks Rebecca before resuming their rivalry. Shiki decides to revisit his home planet, Granbell, still believing the robots there to be infected with a virus that causes hostility towards humans; Connor also travels to Granbell in his ship, Edens One, which has not been destroyed in World No. 30. Upon arrival, Shiki's group discovers the robots' deaths by Ether depletion, as well as video evidence that their infection was an act devised for Shiki to escape with Rebecca and Happy. The group is suddenly approached by Demon King Ziggy, Shiki's adoptive grandfather, who has mysteriously reactivated despite his own death ten years earlier.
37	12	"Clash of the Cosmos"; Transliteration: "Gekitō no Sora" (Japanese: 激闘の宇宙(ソラ))	Yoshiyuki Nogami, Momo Shimizu	Mitsutaka Hirota	Shinji Ishihira	June 18, 2023
Shiki is overjoyed by Ziggy's revival, but Ziggy promptly attacks Shiki, disowning him and renouncing his own faith in humans. Edens One descends over Ziggy, who declares his intent for machines to rule over humanity. Ziggy beckons Pino to join him, forcing her to begin deleting her memories while he destroys the Granbell Kingdom with his gravity, but she stops herself when Shiki persuades her to make her own decisions. Shiki's crew escapes Granbell as Ziggy boards Edens One and crushes the island. Ziggy introduces his new android crew, the Demon King's Four Dark Stars, and orders Connor, his reluctant human servant, to destroy Edens Zero. Edens Zero is outdone by Connor and one of the Dark Stars, Wizard, but Shiki's crew is rescued by their ally, space pirate Elsie Crimson.
38	13	"The Woman They Called Pirate"; Transliteration: "Kaizoku to Yobare Onna" (Japanese: 海賊と呼ばれ女)	Yoshihiro Mori	Mitsutaka Hirota	Takeshi Mori	June 25, 2023
Elsie's arrival allows Edens Zero to dodge Edens One's Star Bringer. Ziggy acknowledges Elsie as one of the Oración Seis Galáctica, six powerful warriors that include Drakken, and retreats. Elsie boards Edens Zero to discuss Ziggy's change, revealing her past as a war refugee whom Ziggy rescued and entrusted with delivering Edens Zero to Shiki. She also reveals that she had been monitoring Ziggy since her last encounter with Shiki, having detected a dark, unfamiliar Ether from his remains, leading to her discovery that Ziggy is seeking Mother again. After Elsie departs, Shiki affirms his crew's goal to find Mother and defeat Ziggy. Resuming their voyage, Edens Zero crosses through Dragonfall and emerges in the Aoi Cosmos, an ocean-filled sector ruled by another of the Oración Seis Galáctica, Emperor Poseidon Nero. Hermit reviews the ship's deleted logs and finds leftover data on the fire planet Red Cave, where she suspects they will find a clue to Mother.
39	14	"Nadia, Love of My Life"; Transliteration: "Waga Saiai no Nadia" (Japanese: 我が最愛のナディア)	Yoshihiro Mori	Mitsutaka Hirota	Takeshi Mori	July 2, 2023
The Interstellar Union Army officer Justice prepares to go to the Aoi Cosmos to capture and kill Elsie, whom he blames for destroying his life. Meanwhile, Edens Zero arrives at Red Cave, which the crew is surprised to find is an oceanic paradise, contrary to its description as a "fire planet". While relaxing at a beach, the crew witnesses a spacecraft crash into the ocean. Shiki's group investigates the craft and finds a human skeleton inside, with Rebecca noticing a message on the control panel reading "Nadia, love of my life". They also find a nearby underwater city littered with deactivated robots, along with a temple bearing a relief of Mother. After being attacked by a monster octopus, the group escapes into the waterless temple, where they are greeted by its guardian, an android woman named Nadia.
40	15	"A Robot in Love"; Transliteration: "Koisuru Kikai" (Japanese: 恋する機械)	Toshinori Watanabe	Megumu Sasano	Toshinori Watanabe	July 9, 2023
Nadia leads Shiki's group to a volcanic cave containing a beacon to Mother left over from the temple's stolen treasure. With the crew unable to cross, Witch enlists the help of Laguna, who has been hiding on Blue Garden since Drakken's defeat. Meanwhile, Nadia talks about her human mechanic and lover, Andrew, who left 200 years earlier to recover the treasure, the theft of which has deactivated Red Cave's other robots and flooded the planet, leaving Nadia sustained by an energy cable. Rebecca realizes the skeleton outside is Andrew's, but withholds the truth to spare Nadia's feelings, as Nadia believes humans to be as long-lived long as androids. Witch and Laguna's powers allow Shiki to safely to obtain the beacon, a trace of Mother's Ether from a Relic, one of several artifacts imbued with her energy. Before the crew leaves in search of more Relics, Witch informs Nadia of Andrew's death by an asteroid collision that trapped his ship in orbit during his return with the Relic. Nadia severs her cable in her grief, but regains her will to live when the Relic's power saves her, revives the other robots, and restores the planet to its original state.
41	16	"In the Doghouse"; Transliteration: "Inu ni Naru" (Japanese: 犬になる)	Yūsuke Onoda	Mitsutaka Hirota	Toshinori Watanabe	July 16, 2023
Elsie's crew is faced with an ambush by Justice's fleet, but escapes to the jungle planet Foresta after exposing her crewman Jesse as a spy in league with the Interstellar Union Army. Meanwhile, Laguna is accepted as a tentative crew member aboard Edens Zero, much to the protest of Weisz, who resents him, Jinn, and Kleene for their servitude to Drakken. The crew detects a Relic on Foresta, but when Shiki's group searches the planet for it, they find a town where robots have rebelled against humans and taken them as pets, leaving many dead. The group is sheltered by Rebecca's visiting friend Couchpo, who explains that Ziggy is responsible for the uprising, having taken control of robots across the planet. Surrounded by a robot mob, Shiki reluctantly leads his friends in fighting them off.
42	17	"The Battle of Foresta"; Transliteration: "Foresuta no Tatakai" (Japanese: フォレスタの戦い)	Yoshiyuki Nogami, Momo Shimizu	Mitsutaka Hirota	Takeshi Mori	July 23, 2023
Edens Zero is attacked by robot drones, rousing Jinn, Kleene, and Laguna to defend the ship. Hermit determines a server is spreading a virus to influence the robots, and that the Four Shining Stars are at risk of being infected as well. Meanwhile, an uninfected robot warns Shiki's team that Nero has sent his commando team, Beast, to purge all robots on Foresta for the safety of humans. Immediately after befriending Shiki, the robot is destroyed by Mora, one of Beast's members. A fight breaks out between Shiki's team and Beast, which leads to members from both sides being separated during an aerial bombardment from the drones. Hermit calls Weisz back to the ship to help disable Ziggy's server, while Shiki, Rebecca, and Homura are faced by Beast members Orc, Britney, and Mora, respectively.
43	18	"Star Drain"; Transliteration: "Sutā Dorein" (Japanese: スタードレイン)	Yoshihiro Mori	Megumi Sasano	Takeshi Mori	July 30, 2023
Shiki enters Overdrive and defeats Orc, who predicts that Shiki and Ziggy will face Shura, another gravity user. Homura defeats Mora after covering him in forest debris to overcome his ability to change into liquid glue, tricking him into returning to a vulnerable solid form. Rebecca is unable to harm Britney, who transforms into a cloud of smoke. Forced to escape, Rebecca runs through a burning portion of the jungle to hinder Britney with its hot air current. Meanwhile, Elsie uses her "Star Drain" Ether Gear to subdue a mob of infected robots, which attracts Justice's attention, while Hermit accompanies Weisz to modify Ziggy's server, a giant satellite.
44	19	"Darling Little Piece of Junk"; Transliteration: "Itoshii Garakuta-chan" (Japanese: 愛しいガラクタちゃん)	Shigeru Ueda	Mitsutaka Hirota	Shinji Ishihira	August 6, 2023 (Note: This episode aired at 1:05 a.m. JST, 10 minutes after the original air time on Nippon TV.)
Rebecca enters an appliance store to use a vacuum cleaner against Britney's smoke form, but Britney floods the building with corrosive mist before Rebecca can bypass the vacuum's user lock. However, Rebecca's Ether Gear reverses time and allows her to activate the vacuum, trapping Britney. Rebecca experiments with her power, discovering its limitations and dangerous effects on her body when overused, and concludes it is a different ability from her previous time leap. Aboard Ziggy's satellite, Weisz and Hermit find it being operated by Hermit's past abuser, the mad scientist Müller, who has become a cyborg and allied with Ziggy. Müller paralyzes Weisz and restrains Hermit to continue experimenting on her, while the nearby Kleene goes into severe mental shock from a malevolent presence. Meanwhile, Shiki and Homura face Beast's most powerful squad, but the squad is easily apprehended by Justice's subordinates Victory and Creed. Justice recognizes Shiki as an inheritor of Ziggy's power and has his men arrest Homura while he prepares to kill Shiki for his open association with Elsie.
45	20	"Kiss & Die"	Toshinori Watanabe	Megumu Sasano	Shinji Ishihira	August 13, 2023
Justice overpowers Shiki with his "Star Drain" Ether Gear, but Elsie rescues Shiki. Fighting each other to the death, Elsie and Justice are revealed to be royalty from a planet where Elsie betrayed their corrupt government and incited a civil war that killed their families. Having been arranged to marry since childhood, the two pretend to rekindle their romance by sharing a kiss as a distraction to stab each other. Meanwhile, Weisz manipulates his Arsenal suit to move his paralyzed body and release Hermit. Enraged, Müller remotely commands the infected robots to kill all humans. Shiki is treated by an uninfected robot with the same gravity powers as him, which the robot uses to immobilize all other machines on the planet. The robot then reveals himself as Xenolith, Ziggy's mentor and the inventor of gravity Ether Gear.
46	21	"The Doomsday System"; Transliteration: "Shūmetsu Shisutemu" (Japanese: 終末システム)	Yoshihiro Mori	Mitsutaka Hirota	Shinji Ishihira	August 20, 2023
The injured Elsie retreats after Xenolith's gravity disrupts her battle with Justice, while Homura escapes with Rebecca after Creed releases Homura to save her from being unwittingly crushed by Victory's giant form. Meanwhile, Müller reveals himself to have dismembered and rebuilt Jinn in front of Kleene during their childhood, making him the source of Kleene's trauma. Overhearing this, Sister erases Kleene's memory of the event to save her life. Müller activates Foresta's self-destruct system before destroying Weisz's Arsenal suit to immobilize him. Laguna arrives and uses his water to maneuver Weisz, who destroys Müller's cybernetic body. Reduced to a living head, Müller pleads for Hermit's forgiveness, but Hermit discards him after using his retinal scan to unlock the server's security system, allowing her to disarm the virus and the self-destruct system. Although the planet's robots return to normal, the crew is unsure if the humans and robots will ever reconcile.
47	22	"Oceans 6"; Transliteration: "Ōshanzu Shikkusu" (Japanese: オーシャンズ6)	Shigeru Ueda	Mitsutaka Hirota	Takeshi Mori	September 3, 2023
The Edens Zero crew recuperates aboard the ship with Couchpo, Xenolith, and a rescued human girl who was friends with the robot destroyed by Mora. Weisz makes peace with Jinn and Kleene, who remain with the crew out of gratitude for Sister curing Kleene. Under the guidance of his prophetic dice, Nero places Shura, his adoptive son, in charge of the response to Foresta's devastation. Shura is given command of Oceans 6, the empire's strongest fighting force, but destroys the team's robotic member, Cyca, out of prejudice towards robots. Meanwhile, Xenolith intensively trains the crew in the ship's virtual reality facility to prepare them for battle against Ziggy. During an escape training session where the crew is helplessly restrained, Ziggy appears to infiltrate the virtual reality through Xenolith's body.
48	23	"Judgment Day"; Transliteration: "Jajjimento Dei" (Japanese: ジャッジメント・デイ)	Yoshiyuki Nogami, Momo Shimizu	Mitsutaka Hirota	Yoshiyuki Nogami	September 10, 2023
Shiki breaks free of his restraints to attack Ziggy when he threatens Rebecca, but discovers Ziggy's invasion to be a hologram Xenolith created as part of their training. Following the session, Xenolith gives the crew a bottle cap Relic, revealing the artifacts to be ordinary items that were on Mother. One week later, the crew completes their training and leaves Foresta to search for more Relics, finding one in the form of a tall building. The search is interrupted by a news broadcast of Shura announcing his intent to eliminate all robots within the Aoi Cosmos in response to the revolts on Foresta and other planets. Meanwhile, Ziggy affirms his mission to destroy Shiki, whom he declares a threat to the universe, and vows to conquer the Aoi Cosmos by seizing Nero's empire.
49	24	"Desert Oasis"; Transliteration: "Sabaku no Oashisu" (Japanese: 砂漠のオアシス)	Toshinori Watanabe	Megumu Sasano	Toshinori Watanabe	September 17, 2023
Shiki resolves to defeat Shura after Hermit discovers the reports of machine rebellions outside Foresta were falsified to justify the robot extermination. Laguna brings the crew to the desert planet Sandra to enlist the help of Oasis, a rebel organization that opposes Nero, revealing himself to be a former member who abandoned the group. The crew learns from Oasis that Shura plans to control the robots through the All-Link System, a network on the planet Nero 66 that only functions when the planets are submerged by the Aoi Cosmos' ocean during high tide. Oasis' leader, Goodwin, initially rejects the crew's help out of hostility towards Laguna, but reconsiders when the crew demonstrates their greatly improved power and skill against a sudden imperial raid.
50	25	"Prelude to the Aoi War"; Transliteration: "Aoi Taisen no Jokyoku" (Japanese: 葵大戦の序曲)	Toshinori Watanabe	Mitsutaka Hirota	Shinji Ishihira	October 1, 2023
The Edens Zero crew sets out to rescue a neighboring city from an attack led by Orc, who has installed a bomb with the capacity to destroy half of Sandra. Orc triggers the bomb after being defeated by Shiki again, but Shiki safely elevates the bomb into the air before it explodes, gaining Oasis' respect. Edens Zero and Oasis travel to Nero 66, where its imperial blockade is preoccupied by the Interstellar Union Army. En route, Laguna reconnects with his former teammates, who tell him that the daughter of Oasis' previous leader was killed by Shura. Weisz confronts Laguna for involving Edens Zero in his vendetta against Nero and threatens to kill him if anything happens to them. While Oasis distracts the imperial fleet, Edens Zero enters the atmosphere of Nero 66, where Shura senses Shiki's darkening Ether.

== Home media release ==
Aniplex+ (Japan – Region 2/A)
Box	Episodes	Artwork	Release date	Ref.
1	26–38	Shiki Granbell, Rebecca Bluegarden, Four Shining Stars, Drakken Joe & Element 4	November 22, 2023	
2	39–50	Shiki Granbell, Rebecca Bluegarden, Happy, Weisz Steiner, E.M. Pino, Homura Kōgetsu, Ziggy, Elsie Crimson & Justice	December 27, 2023	
