= Mikazuki no Koukai =

Studio album by Sayuri
- Released: May 17, 2017
- Genre: J-pop
- Length: 63:52
- Label: Ariola Japan

Sayuri chronology
Mikazuki no Koukai (2017)	Me (2020)

Singles from Mikazuki no Koukai
- 1. "Mikazuki" Released: August 25, 2015; 2. "Sore wa Chiisana Hikari no Youna" Released: February 24, 2016; 3. "Ru-Rararu-Ra-Rurararu-Ra-" Released: June 23, 2016; 4. "Furaregai Girl" Released: December 7, 2016; 5. "Parallel Line" Released: March 1, 2017

Mikazuki No Koukai (ミカヅキの航海, Crescent Moon Voyage) is the debut studio album by Japanese pop singer and songwriter Sayuri. It was released on May 17, 2017, by Ariola Japan.

== Release ==
The album was released on May 17, 2017, in Japan. The album was also available as a limited edition Blu-ray/DVD combination, the Blu-ray edition featured all music videos and the DVD edition featured a live digest video. All singles, except "Ru-Rararu-Ra-Rurararu-Ra-", were available on CD and DVD (containing the music video for the single). Singles were released in different editions, consist of three editions: regular edition, limited edition type A & B and limited anime edition.

Three songs were used as ending theme songs for anime, "Mikazuki", "Sore wa Chiisana Hikari no Youna" and "Parallel Line" for Rampo Kitan: Game of Laplace, Erased and Scum's Wish respectively. The first single from the album was "Mikazuki" and it was released on August 25, 2015. The single reached number 20 in the Oricon Chart. The single was followed by "Sore wa Chiisana Hikari no Youna", "Ru-Rararu-Ra-Rurararu-Ra-", "Furaregai Girl" and "Parallel Line". "Parallel Line" reached number 10 in the Oricon and Japan Hot 100, making it the highest-charting single in both chart for her to date. The album itself charted at number 3 in the Oricon chart and 4 in the Japan Hot Album.

== Track listing ==
All tracks are written by Sayuri, except "Furaregai Girl" by Yojiro Noda and "Sore wa Chiisana Hikari no Youna" by Yuki Kajiura

Regular edition
No.	Title	Length
1.	"Mikazuki" (ミカヅキ Crescent Moon)	4:21
2.	"Parallel Line" (平行線 Heikousen)	4:58
3.	"Juu Oku nen" (十億年 A Billion Year)	5:23
4.	"Cake o Yaku" (ケーキを焼く Bake a Cake)	3:37
5.	"Furaregai Girl" (フラレガイガール Girl Who Should Be Rejected)	6:07
6.	"Hachi to Misemono" (蜂と見世物 A Bee and Circus)	4:03
7.	"Ru-Rararu-Ra-Rurararu-Ra-" (るーららるーらーるららるーらー)	3:18
8.	"Eyes Mismatched in Colour" (オッドアイ Oddo Ai)	4:54
9.	"Sore wa Chiisana Hikari no Youna" (それは小さな光のような It's Like a Small Light)	4:32
10.	"Raise de Aou" (来世で会おう See You In The Afterlife)	4:40
11.	"Knot"	4:42
12.	"Anonymous" (アノニマス Anonimasu)	4:31
13.	"Natsu" (夏 Summer)	3:29
14.	"Birthday Song"	5:17
Total length:		63:52

Blu-ray edition
No.	Title	Length
1.	"Mikazuki" (music video)	4:30
2.	"Sore wa Chiisana Hikari no Youna" (music video)	4:32
3.	"Raise de Aou" (music video)	4:47
4.	"Furaregai Girl" (music video)	6:07
5.	"Anonymous" (music video)	4:29
6.	"Parallel Line" (music video)	5:08
7.	"Birthday Song" (music video)	3:17

DVD edition
No.	Title	Length
1.	"Live from Tokyo Cinema Club (2016/6/24) and Shinjuku ReNY (2016/11/3)"

== Charts ==
Year	Chart	Peak positions
2017	Oricon	3
2017	Japan Hot Album	4

== Release history ==
Region	Date	Label	Format	Catalog
Japan	May 17, 2017	Ariola Japan	CD	BVCL-795
Japan	May 17, 2017	Ariola Japan	CD+Blu-ray	BVCL-791
Japan	May 17, 2017	Ariola Japan	CD+DVD	BVCL-793
