= I'm Home =

2015 Japanese drama TV series

- Genre: Drama
- Written by: Kōji Hayashi
- Starring: Takuya Kimura; Aya Ueto
- Country of origin: Japan
- Original language: Japanese
- No. of series: 1
- No. of episodes: 10

Production
- Producers: Tatsuki Ōe; Seiji Kawashima; Masaharu Ōta
- Running time: 54 minutes

Original release
- Network: TV Asahi
- Release: 16 April – 18 June 2015

アイムホーム (I'm Home) is a Japanese television drama series based on the manga by Kei Ishizaka. It premiered on TV Asahi on 16 April 2015, starring Takuya Kimura and Aya Ueto. The drama received a viewership rating of 14.8% on average, and it was the highest rating for any other television drama in April–June term 2015. There is the NHK adapted version titled アイ'ムホーム (I'm Home) in 2004.

== Plot ==
Hisashi Ieji (Takuya Kimura), a successful securities' company employee gets injured in an explosion. The accident causes him amnesia, deleting last 5 years from his memory. He doesn't recognize his current family, seeing their faces as emotionless masks but remembers well his ex-wife and their daughter. On top of that his former aggressive and selfish personality disappears giving way to a considerate and caring man. The company higher-ups transfer Hisashi to a marginal, "drop-outs" department but instead of neglecting him closely watch his every move.

== Cast ==
=== Main ===
- Takuya Kimura as Hisashi Ieji
- Aya Ueto as Megumi Ieji
- Miki Mizuno as Kaoru Nozawa
- Kei Tanaka as Tsuyoshi Honjō
- Miyu Yoshimoto as Yua Takanashi
- Toshiyuki Nishida as Yukio Kozukue

=== Guest ===
- Teruyuki Kagawa as Masao Takeda (ep.1)
- Saki Takaoka as a hostess at a bar in Ginza (ep.1)
- Akiko Hinagata (ep.4)
- Jun Fubuki as Azusa Ieji (ep.5)
- Kin'ya Kitaōji as Yōzō Kitaōji (ep.7)
- Yūsuke Santamaria (ep.9)
- Nozomi Sasaki (ep.10)

== Episodes ==
| No. | Title | Directed by | Original release date | Ratings (%) |
|---|---|---|---|---|
| 1 | "ただいま!壊れかけた家族…仮面の妻との夫婦生活!?" | Gō Shichitaka | April 16, 2015 | 16.7 |
| 2 | "仮面の妻と結婚した理由…親友に暴かれた僕の正体!?" | Gō Shichitaka | April 23, 2015 | 14.0 |
| 3 | "僕は義父を殺した!?苦いワインの秘密…" | Naoki Tamura | April 30, 2015 | 13.5 |
| 4 | "僕が"熟年離婚"させた夫婦!?単身赴任のあやまち…" | Naoki Tamura | May 7, 2015 | 12.6 |
| 5 | "母への詫び状…僕の二人の妻たちの闘い" | Gō Shichitaka | May 14, 2015 | 14.5 |
| 6 | "最後の家族旅行で…よみがえる記憶!!妻に仮面の告白" | Naoki Tamura | May 21, 2015 | 13.2 |
| 7 | "母と僕を捨てた男…愛憎の果て" | Kazunari Hoshino | May 28, 2015 | 13.1 |
| 8 | "最終章戻れない二人…仮面の夫婦が、W不倫!?" | Naoki Tamura | June 4, 2015 | 13.4 |
| 9 | "最終章離婚届!!家族との別れ逮捕と、監視の理由" | Gō Shichitaka | June 11, 2015 | 16.5 |
| 10 | "すべての謎が明らかに!!仮面の妻との別離…涙の結末!" | Gō Shichitaka | June 18, 2015 | 19.0 |

| Preceded by Doctors 3: Saikyō no Meii (8 January 2015 - 5 March 2015) | TV Asahi Thursday Dramas; Thursdays 21:00 - 21:54 (JST) | Succeeded by Age Harassment (9 July 2015 - ) |
