= Parallel Line (Sayuri song) =

Song by Sayuri

- Cover of regular single

Single by Sayuri

from the album Mikazuki no Koukai
- Released: March 1, 2017
- Genre: J-pop
- Length: 4:58
- Label: Ariola Japan
- Songwriter: Sayuri

Sayuri singles chronology
"Furaregai Girl" (2016)	"Parallel Line" (2017)	"Tsuki to Hanataba" (2018)

Alternative cover
- Limited edition cover

Music video
- "Parallel Line" on YouTube

"Parallel Line" (平行線, Heikousen) is a song by Japanese pop singer Sayuri. It was released as the fifth single of her debut studio album, Mikazuki no Koukai, on March 1, 2017. It reached number 10 on Oricon and Japan Hot 100, making her enter Top 10 for first time in both charts. It was used as the ending for the anime Scum's Wish.

== Release ==
On 15 December 2016, Fuji TV's Noitamina revealed that Sayuri would perform "Parallel Line" as ending theme song for Scum's Wish. Parallel Line was released as a single on 1 March 2017 on three edition; Regular edition, Limited edition and Limited anime edition. The single reached number 10 on Oricon and Japan Hot 100 and 4 on Japan Hot Animation with spent 8, 5 and 6 weeks respectively.

== Music video ==
The music video for "Parallel Line" was directed by Yasuhiro Arafune and the storyboards were created from Scum's Wish's author Mengo Yokoyari. The video features Sayuri singing in front of mirrors with night sky and cracked glass effect. Sometimes scene shifts to a classroom and a white background. It was also mixed with the scene from anime Scum's Wish.

== Track listing ==
All tracks written by Sayuri.

=== Regular edition ===
CD
No.	Title	Length
1.	"Parallel Line" (平行線 Heikousen)	4:58
2.	"Bandage"	3:07

=== Limited edition ===
CD
No.	Title	Length
1.	"Parallel Line" (平行線 Heikousen)	4:58
2.	"Anonymous" (アノニマス Anonimasu) (Hikigatari version)	4:26
3.	"Neverland" (ネバーランド Nebārando)	5:48

DVD
No.	Title	Length
1.	"Parallel Line" (music video)	5:08

=== Limited anime edition ===
CD
No.	Title	Length
1.	"Parallel Line" (平行線 Heikousen)	4:58
2.	"Suicide Fish" (スーサイドさかな Sūsaido sakana)	3:51
3.	"Parallel Line" (Scum's Wish's ending version)	2:00

DVD
No.	Title	Length
1.	"Parallel Line" (Scum's Wish's ending version without credit)	1:41

== Personnel ==
- Sayuri - music, lyrics
- Eiji Nishihara - producer
- Hidehiro Kawai - arranger, bass, keyboard
- Haruka - guitar
- Tsukasa Inoue - drums
- Ayaka Toki - recording engineer
- Masayoshi Sugai - mixing engineer
- Mitsuyasu Abe - mastering engineer

== Charts ==
Year	Chart	Peak position
2017	Oricon	10
2017	Japan Hot 100	10
2017	Japan Hot Animation	4

== Release history ==
Region	Date	Label	Format	Catalog
Japan	1 March 2017	Ariola Japan	CD	BVCL-782
Japan	1 March 2017	Ariola Japan	CD+DVD	BVCL-780
Japan	1 March 2017	Ariola Japan	CD+DVD	BVCL-783
