= Furaregai Girl =

Single by Sayuri

from the album Mikazuki no Koukai
- Released: December 7, 2016
- Genre: J-pop
- Length: 6:07
- Label: Ariola Japan
- Songwriter(s): Yojiro Noda
- Producer(s): Yojiro Noda

Sayuri singles chronology
"Ru-Rararu-Ra-Rurararu-Ra-" (2016)	"Furaregai Girl" (2016)	"Parallel Line" (2017)

"Furaregai Girl" (フラレガイガール, Girl Who Should Be Rejected) is a song by Japanese pop singer Sayuri. It was released as the fourth single of her debut studio album, Mikazuki no Koukai, on December 7, 2016. It was written and produced by Radwimps's vocalist and guitarist, Yojiro Noda. About the song, Yojiro said, "I had already composed the song and created the lyrics, but I knew that I couldn't sing it. For a while, I searched for the true owner of the song. Then, by chance, I was in the recording studio next to Sayuri. I listened to her CD, and in that moment, something that was only a vague silhouette of a song became crystal clear. It was a song that she was meant to sing."

== Music video ==
The music video for "Furaregai Girl" was directed by Nao Yoshigai. The video features Makoto Tanaka as a girl who has just been dumped depressed with the reality and Sayuri singing in the black background.

== Track listing ==
=== Regular edition ===
CD
No.	Title	Length
1.	"Furaregai Girl" (フラレガイガール Girl Who Should Be Rejected)	6:07
2.	"Anonymous" (アノニマス Anonimasu)	4:31
3.	"Anonymous" (アノニマス Anonimasu) (sanketsu remix)

=== Limited edition type A ===
CD
No.	Title	Length
1.	"Furaregai Girl" (フラレガイガール Girl Who Should Be Rejected)	6:07
2.	"Anonymous" (アノニマス Anonimasu)	4:31
3.	"Proust" (プルースト Purūsuto) (hikigatari version)	4:27
4.	"Rura" (ルラ)	4:02

DVD
No.	Title	Length
1.	"Shibuya WWW One-Man Live "Mikazuki no Koukai" Live Digest Video (2016/4/23)"

=== Limited edition type B ===
CD
No.	Title	Length
1.	"Furaregai Girl" (フラレガイガール Girl Who Should Be Rejected)	6:07
2.	"Anonymous" (アノニマス Anonimasu)	4:31
3.	"Niche to Kimi" (ニーチェと君 Nietzsche and You) (hikigatari version)	3:33

DVD
No.	Title	Length
1.	"Anonymous" (music video)	4:29

== Personnel ==
Credits are adapted from the album's liner notes.

- Sayuri - vocals
- Yojiro Noda - lyrics, music, arranger, producer, programming, chorus
- Sae Konno - piano
- Natsuki Sakamoto - guitars
- Katsuhiro Mafune - bass
- Mizuki Mori - drums
- Masayoshi Sugai - recording engineer, mixing engineer
- Dick Beetham - mastering engineer

== Charts ==
Year	Chart	Peak position
2016	Oricon	17
2016	Japan Hot 100	22

== Release history ==
Region	Date	Label	Format	Catalog
Japan	7 December 2016	Ariola Japan	CD	BVCL-767
Japan	7 December 2016	Ariola Japan	CD+DVD	BVCL-763
Japan	7 December 2016	Ariola Japan	CD+DVD	BVCL-765
