= Is There a Vet in the House? =

- Genre: Drama
- Written by: Mitsuru Tanabe
- Directed by: Tatsuya Ikezawa; Hiroyuki Muramatsu; Daisuke Itō
- Starring: Takanori Jinnai; Miyu Yoshimoto; Yōko Nogiwa
- Ending theme: "Always with You" by Generations from Exile Tribe
- Country of origin: Japan
- Original language: Japanese
- No. of seasons: 1
- No. of episodes: 12

Production
- Producers: Yoshitsugu Nishikawa; Daisaku Yamada; Miho Takenaka

Original release
- Network: Yomiuri TV; Nippon TV
- Release: 3 July – 18 September 2014

Is There a Vet in the House? (獣医さん、事件ですよ, Jūi-San, Jiken Desu yo) is a Japanese television drama series. It premiered on 3 July 2014 and is broadcast on Yomiuri TV and on Nippon TV. It's streamed on Crunchyroll in several territories since 4 July 2014.

== Plot ==
The series is set in Tokyo.

== Cast ==
=== Main ===
- Takanori Jinnai as Kentarō Shiba, a director of the hospital
- Miyu Yoshimoto as Hinako Shiba, Kentarō's non-blooded daughter
- Yōko Nogiwa as Hanae Shiba, a nurse
- Tetsuya Makita as Shinya Tamaki, a veterinary

=== Guest ===
- Yumiko Shaku as Hitomi Asano (Ep.1)
- Akiko Hinagata as Rina Koizumi (Ep.4)
- Yoko Minamino as Yuki Tamaki (Ep.9)
- Mako Ishino as Tōko Mizusawa (Ep.10)
- Guts Ishimatsu as Tatsuo (EP.10)
- Yūko Asano as Nanako Sakura (Ep.12)
