= Sore wa Chiisana Hikari no Youna =

- The regular edition cover

Single by Sayuri

from the album Mikazuki no Koukai
- Released: February 24, 2016
- Genre: J-pop
- Length: 4:32
- Label: Ariola Japan
- Songwriter: Yuki Kajiura

Sayuri singles chronology
"Mikazuki" (2015)	"Sore wa Chiisana Hikari no Youna" (2016)	"Ru-Rararu-Ra-Rurararu-Ra-" (2016)

Alternative cover
- The limited pressing edition cover

"Sore wa Chiisana Hikari no Youna" (それは小さな光のような, It's Like a Small Light) is a song by Japanese pop singer Sayuri. It was released as the second single of her debut studio album, Mikazuki no Koukai, on February 24, 2016. It was used as the ending for the anime Erased.

== Music video ==
The music video for "Sore wa Chiisana Hikari no Youna" was directed by YKBX.

== Track listing ==
=== Regular edition ===
CD
No.	Title	Length
1.	"Sore wa Chiisana Hikari no Youna" (それは小さな光のような It's Like a Small Light)	4:32
2.	"Raise de Aou" (来世で会おう See You In The Afterlife)

=== Limited edition type A ===
CD
No.	Title	Length
1.	"Sore wa Chiisana Hikari no Youna" (それは小さな光のような It's Like a Small Light)	4:32
2.	"Raise de Aou" (来世で会おう See You In The Afterlife)
3.	"Hikari to Yami" (光と闇 Light and Darkness)

DVD
No.	Title	Length
1.	"Sore wa Chiisana Hikari no Youna" (music video)	4:32

=== Limited edition type B ===
CD
No.	Title	Length
1.	"Sore wa Chiisana Hikari no Youna" (それは小さな光のような It's Like a Small Light)	4:32
2.	"Raise de Aou" (来世で会おう See You In The Afterlife)
3.	"Suicide Fish" (スーサイドさかな Sūsaido sakana) (hikigatari version)

DVD
No.	Title	Length
1.	"Raise de Aou" (music video)	4:48

=== Limited pressing ===
CD
No.	Title	Length
1.	"Sore wa Chiisana Hikari no Youna" (それは小さな光のような It's Like a Small Light)	4:32
2.	"Raise de Aou" (来世で会おう See You In The Afterlife)
3.	"Fūsen" (ふうせん Balloon) (hikigatari version)

DVD
No.	Title	Length
1.	"Sore wa Chiisana Hikari no Youna" (Erased's ending version without credit)

== Personnel ==
Credits are adapted from the CD liner notes

- Sayuri - vocals
- Yuki Kajiura - lyrics, music
- Ryo Eguchi - arranger, all instrument, recording engineer
- Ayaka Toki - recording engineer
- Masashi Uramoto - mixing engineer, mastering engineer

== Charts ==
Year	Chart	Peak position
2016	Oricon	17
2016	Japan Hot 100	15
2016	Japan Hot Animation	1

== Release history ==
Region	Date	Label	Format	Catalog
Japan	24 February 2016	Ariola Japan	CD	BVCL-700
Japan	24 February 2016	Ariola Japan	CD+DVD	BVCL-696
Japan	24 February 2016	Ariola Japan	CD+DVD	BVCL-698
Japan	24 February 2016	Ariola Japan	CD+DVD	BVCL-701
