= Miyu Yoshimoto =

Japanese actress, idol, and tarento (born 1996)

- 吉本 実憂
- Born: 28 December 1996 (age 29); Kitakyushu, Fukuoka Prefecture, Japan
- Occupations: Actress; idol; tarento
- Years active: 2012–present
- Agent: Shortcut
- Website: miyu-yoshimoto.com

Miyu Yoshimoto (吉本 実憂, Yoshimoto Miyu; born December 28, 1996) is a Japanese actress, idol, and tarento. She is the winner of the 13th Japan Bishōjo Contest in 2012, and the leader of the Japanese idol group X21.

== Biography ==
=== Early life ===
Yoshimoto was born on December 28, 1996, in Kitakyushu, Fukuoka Prefecture.

=== Career ===
In 2012, Yoshimoto won the 13th Japan Bishōjo Contest, then entered entertainment industry. In January 2013, with the other twenty contest participants, she formed idol group unit X21. On September 3, 2013, she won the "Best of Beauty 2013" for the teens category.

Yoshimoto made her screen debut in the YTV's midnight drama Is There a Vet in the House? in July 2014, and made her film debut in the 2014 film Yumeharuka in a lead role. In June 2015, she received "E-Line Beautiful Award" from the Japan Association of Adult Orthodontics.

== Appearances ==
=== TV dramas ===
- Is There a Vet in the House? (YTV, 2014), Hinako Shiba
- Taiga drama Gunshi Kanbei Episode 46-50 (NHK, 2014), Eihime
- I'm Home (TV Asahi, 2015), Yua Takanashi
- High School Chorus (TBS, 2015), Yuria Tani
- From Five To Nine (Fuji TV, 2015), Kaori Ashikaga
- The Girl Who Leapt Through Time (NTV, 2016), Zoy
- Honto ni Atta Kowai Hanashi Natsu no Tokubetsu-hen 2016 - Ryūdō Suru Wazawai (Fuji TV, 2016)
- Daddy Sister (NHK, 2016), Tamaki Mizuta
- Scum's Wish (Fuji TV, 2017), Hanabi Yasuraoka

=== Film ===
- Yumeharuka (2014), Haruka Honda
- The Edge of Sin (2015), Saki Kiba
- High&Low The Red Rain (2016)
- Lady in White (2018)
- Mentai Piriri (2019)
- JK Rock (2019)
- Mystic Shrine Maiden (2020)
- Angry Rice Wives (2021)
- Dreaming in Between (2023)
- Muromachi Outsiders (2025)
- Shinpei (2025), Sumako Matsui

=== Radio ===
- X21 Miyu Yoshimoto Gozen 4-ji no Cinderella (6 April 2014 -, Nippon Cultural Broadcasting)
- X21 Miyu Yoshimoto Colorful Box (6 April 2013 -, Radio Nippon)
- X21 Yoshimoto Miyu to Igashira Manami no Bishōjo X2 (7 April 2013 -, Nippon Broadcasting System)

== Bibliography ==
=== Photobooks ===
- Miyu Yoshimoto Photobook (Wani Books, May 2013) ISBN 9784847045431

== Awards ==
- The 13th Japan Bishōjo Contest (2012): Grand Prix
- The 11th Clarino Beautiful Legs Award (2013): Won(Teens category)
- The Best of Beauty 2013: Won(Teens category)
- E-Line Beautiful Award (2015): Won
