= Sayuri (musician) =

Japanese musician (1996–2024)

- さユり
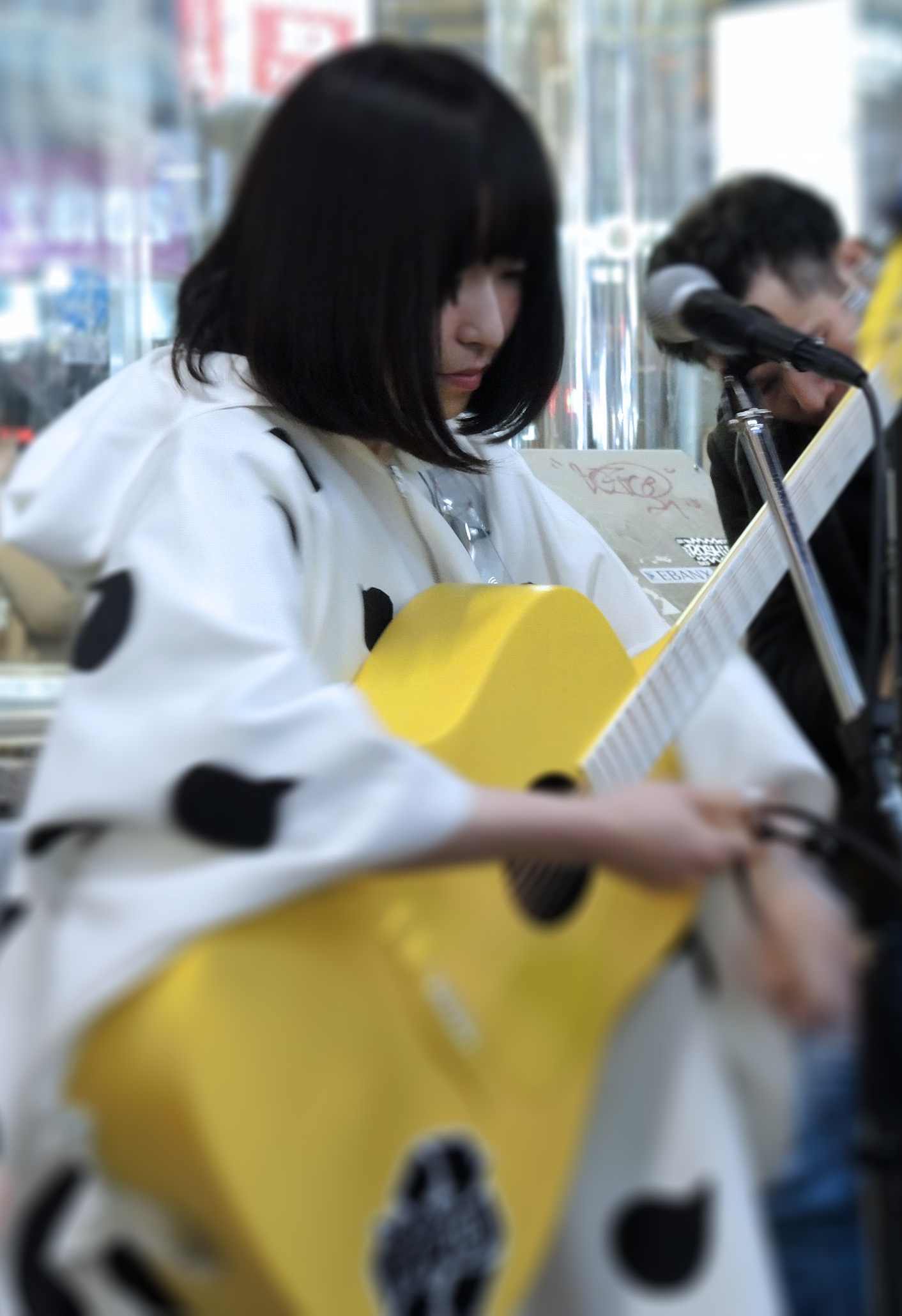
- Sayuri performing in 2016
- Born: June 7, 1996; Fukuoka, Japan
- Died: September 20, 2024 (aged 28)
- Other name: Sanketsu Shōjo Sayuri (酸欠少女さユり)
- Occupations: Musician; singer; songwriter
- Years active: 2010–2024
- Height: 149 cm (4 ft 11 in)
- Musical career
- Genres: J-pop; pop; rock; acoustic
- Instruments: Vocals; guitar
- Label: Ariola Japan
- Website: www.sayuri-official.com

Sayuri (Note: Her family name is publicly unknown.) (さユり (Note: While Sayuri's stage name uses the katakana character ユ for stylistic effect, her real name is spelled with the hiragana character ゆ. They are both pronounced as [jɯ]. In full, her name is transcribed [sajɯɾi].); June 7, 1996 – September 20, 2024) was a Japanese musician, singer and songwriter. After winning the Music Revolution Grand Prix in 2012, she left school and started her music career. In 2015, she released her debut single "Mikazuki", the ending theme of Rampo Kitan: Game of Laplace, and she later sang theme songs for the anime series Erased, Scum's Wish, Fate/Extra Last Encore, Golden Kamuy, My Hero Academia, Sing "Yesterday" for Me, Edens Zero, and Lycoris Recoil.

== Biography ==
=== 1996–2015: Early life, Music Revolution, "Mikazuki" ===
Sayuri, a native of Shika Island in Higashi-ku, Fukuoka, was born on June 7, 1996. Inspired by the idol boy band Kanjani Eight, Sayuri took up guitar as a hobby and began composing music during her second year of middle school. Afterwards, she performed in the band Muu (as guitarist and vocalist) and the acoustic duo Longtal (under the name Asuka), and she did street performances and live house appearances in places like Hiroshima, Osaka, and Nagoya.

In 2012, Sayuri won the Grand Prix at the 5th Music Revolution finals, where she was their youngest contestant. She left school and moved to Tokyo the next year; despite dropping out of high school, she later tweeted in January 2015 that she took the exam for the Certificate for Students Achieving the Proficiency Level of Upper Secondary School Graduates. Despite performing at live houses, she preferred performing on the more-open streets for a more diverse range of people; she said in an interview with Kai-You that these street performances were originally intended for training. In March 2015, Sayuri held her first solo concert, "Yoake no Shitaku", at Tsutaya O-East in Tokyo. On August 26, 2015, she released her first single "Mikazuki", making her major debut at 19; the song was also the ending theme for the anime series Rampo Kitan: Game of Laplace.

=== 2016–2017: "Sore wa Chiisana Hikari no Youna", "Parallel Line", Mikazuki no Koukai ===
She sang "Sore wa Chiisana Hikari no Youna", the ending theme of the Erased anime; composed and written by Yuki Kajiura, it was released as her second single on February 24, 2016. On April 23, 2016, she held a solo concert "Mikazuki no Koukai" at the Shibuya WWW; tickets were sold out only seconds after they went on sale. On June 3, 2016, she re-released her Music Revolution song "Ru-Rararu-Ra-Rurararu-Ra" as her digital-only third single; the song was later included in a four-track EP of the same name, released on June 24. On December 7, 2016, she and Yojiro Noda of Radwimps collaborated for her fourth single "Furaregai Girl". On March 1, 2017, Sayuri released her fifth single "Parallel Line," which was featured as the ending song to both the anime and live-action adaptations of Scum's Wish, becoming her first Japanese television drama ending song.

On March 23, 2017, it was announced that she would release her first album Mikazuki no Koukai on May 17. The day after her album was released, it reached first on Oricon's Daily Album Chart, and it later ranked third on the weekly Oricon Albums Chart. On August 23, the full-length music video for one of the album's songs, "Jū-oku-nen" (十億年; lit. 'A Billion Years'), was released. On May 19, 2017, she held her first street performance in over a year in Shinjuku, with approximately 2,000 fans in attendance. On November 24, 2017, Sayuri's solo concert at Tokyo Dome City Hall became her largest up to this point.

=== 2018–2021: "Tsuki to Hanataba", "Reimei", "Kōkai no Uta" ===
Sayuri released her sixth single "Tsuki to Hanataba" (月と花束; lit. 'Moon and Bouquet') on February 28, 2018; the song was the ending theme of the anime Fate/Extra Last Encore. She performed at Anisong World Matsuri at Anime Expo on July 6, 2018, in Los Angeles, California. She collaborated with My First Story for the song "Reimei" (レイメイ; lit. 'Dawn'), released on November 27, 2018; the song is used as the second opening theme of the anime series Golden Kamuy. Sayuri was featured on Hiroyuki Sawano's song "Me & Creed <nZkv>", which was originally planned to be the theme song for the mobile game Blue Exorcist: Damned Chord before being cancelled in 2020.

Between August 2–4, 2019, Sayuri performed two concerts in Mannheim during AnimagiC convention which marked her first concerts in Germany and her European concert debut. Later that month, on August 25 it was announced that she will perform the ending theme song for the anime My Hero Academia season 4 with her song "Kōkai no Uta" (航海の唄; lit. 'Song of the Voyage'); it was released as a single on November 27, 2019. Milan Records released an eponymous "World Edition" EP on digital platforms on November 29, serving as Sayuri's international debut. On May 22, 2020, her new song "Aoibashi", the theme song for the anime Sing "Yesterday" for Me, was released digitally; it was named after the former Keiō Line station. Sayuri released the hikigatari album Me on June 3, 2020, consisting of acoustic renditions of her previous songs; she later embarked on the 12-show Nejikoboreta Bokura no "Me" tour in 2022 to promote the album. On August 1, 2020, she released another digital single "Summer Bug". On October 24, 2020, Sayuri announced that she would be signing with iTony Entertainment. She released the song "Kamisama" on March 5, 2021; it was used as the opening theme for the drama series Tokyo Kaiki Zake. On September 8, 2021, she released the song "Sekai no Himitsu" (世界の秘密; lit. 'World Secret'), which served as the second ending theme of the anime series Edens Zero.

=== 2022–2024: "Hana no Tō", marriage, and death ===
On July 3, 2022, "Hana no Tō" (花の塔; lit. 'Tower of Flower'), the ending theme to the anime series Lycoris Recoil, was released the day after the series premiere. On August 10, 2022, she released her second album Sanketsu Shōjo. In October 2023, Sayuri was featured on the song "Akuma no Uta" (アクマノウタ; lit. 'Devil's Song') by BAK. On March 18, 2024, she announced that she had been married to Amaarashi, one half of the J-pop duo Misekai.

On July 25, 2024, she announced that she would take a hiatus from singing to recover from functional dysphonia. On September 27, 2024, Amaarashi released a statement announcing that Sayuri had died on September 20 at age 28. A private funeral was held by her relatives and close friends. It was stated that she had been suffering from a chronic illness.

== Musical style ==
She used the monikers "Sanketsu Shōjo" (酸欠少女; lit. 'Hypoxia Girl') and "2.5D Parallel Singer-Songwriter" (2.5次元パラレルシンガーソングライター, 2.5-jigen Parareru Shingāsonguraitā). She normally performed in a poncho while barefoot because, as she revealed in an interview with JaME she felt she is "one with the land when I'm standing there". Her musical image would depict her real self as a "floating presence" between her "2D" online career and "3D" live career. Yukako of TicketJam said that Sayuri "has a wide range of charm as a singer-songwriter, such as her overwhelming singing voice and singing ability that captivates not only listeners but also fellow artists, and her unique songwriting sense".

== Discography ==
=== Studio albums ===
List of studio albums, showing selected details and chart positions
Title	Album details	Peak chart positions	
Title	Album details	JPN	JPN Hot
Mikazuki no Koukai (ミカヅキの航海; lit. 'Crescent Moon Voyage')	Released: May 17, 2017; Label: Ariola Japan; Formats: CD, CD+DVD, CD+BD, digital download	3	4
Sanketsu Shōjo (酸欠少女; lit. 'Hypoxia Girl')	Released: August 10, 2022; Label: Ariola Japan; Formats: CD, digital download	13	8

=== Remix album ===
List of remix albums, showing selected details and chart positions
Title	Album details	Peak chart positions	
Title	Album details	JPN	JPN Hot
Me (め)	Released: June 3, 2020; Label: Ariola Japan; Formats: CD, CD+DVD	3	2

=== Extended plays ===
List of extended plays, showing selected details
Title	EP details
Ru-Rararu-Ra-Rurararu-Ra (るーららるーらーるららるーらー)	Released: June 24, 2016; Label: Ariola Japan; Formats: Digital download, streaming
About a Voyage (World Edition)	Released: November 29, 2019; Label: Milan Records; Formats: Digital download, streaming

=== Singles ===
==== CD singles ====
List of CD singles, showing year released, selected chart positions, certifications, and associated album
Title	Year	Peak chart positions		Certifications	Album
Title	Year	JPN	JPN Hot	Certifications	Album
"Mikazuki" (ミカヅキ; lit. 'Crescent Moon')	2015	20	14	RIAJ: Gold (download)	Mikazuki no Koukai
"Sore wa Chiisana Hikari no Youna" (それは小さな光のような; lit. 'It Is Like a Small Light')	2016	17	15		Mikazuki no Koukai
"Furaregai Girl" (フラレガイガール; lit. 'Girl Who Should Be Rejected')	2016	17	22		Mikazuki no Koukai
"Parallel Line" (平行線, Heikousen)	2017	10	10		Mikazuki no Koukai
"Tsuki to Hanataba" (月と花束; lit. 'Moon and Bouquet')	2018	10	10		Sanketsu Shōjo
"Reimei" (レイメイ; lit. 'Dawn') (with My First Story)	2018	7	10		Sanketsu Shōjo
"Kōkai no Uta" (航海の唄; lit. 'Song of the Voyage')	2019	12	34		Sanketsu Shōjo
"Sekai no Himitsu" (世界の秘密; lit. 'World Secret')	2021	10	— (Note: "Sekai no Himitsu" did not enter the Billboard Japan Hot 100, but peaked at number 80 on the Download Songs chart.)		Sanketsu Shōjo
"—" denotes a single that did not chart.

==== Digital singles ====
===== As lead artist =====
List of digital singles as lead artist, showing year released, selected chart positions, certifications, and associated album
Title	Year	Peak chart positions		Certifications	Album
Title	Year	JPN Dig.	JPN Hot	Certifications	Album
"Ru-Rararu-Ra-Rurararu-Ra" (るーららるーらーるららるーらー)	2016	—	—		Mikazuki no Koukai
"Nejiko" (ねじこ)	2020	—	— (Note: "Nejiko" did not enter the Billboard Japan Hot 100, but peaked at number 58 on the Download Songs chart.)		Sanketsu Shōjo
"Aoibashi" (葵橋)	2020	34	— (Note: "Aoibashi" did not enter the Billboard Japan Hot 100, but peaked at number 37 on the Download Songs chart.)		Sanketsu Shōjo
"Summer Bug"	2020	—	— (Note: "Summer Bug" did not enter the Billboard Japan Hot 100, but peaked at number 69 on the Download Songs chart.)		Sanketsu Shōjo
"Kamisama" (かみさま)	2021	—	— (Note: "Kamisama" did not enter the Billboard Japan Hot 100, but peaked at number 87 on the Download Songs chart.)		Sanketsu Shōjo
"Hana no Tō" (花の塔; lit. 'Flower Tower')	2022	5	52	RIAJ: Gold (download); RIAJ: Platinum (streaming)	Sanketsu Shōjo
"—" denotes a single that did not chart.

===== As featured artist =====
List of digital singles as featured artist, showing year released
Title	Year
"Akuma no Uta" (アクマノウタ; lit. 'Devil's Song') (BAK featuring Sayuri)	2023

=== Guest appearance ===
List of guest appearances, showing year released and associated album and artist
Song	Year	Album	Album artist
"Me & Creed <nZkv>"	2019	Remember	SawanoHiroyuki[nZk]

== Music videos ==
List of music videos, showing year released and directors
Title	Year	Director(s)	Ref.
"Mikazuki"	2015	YKBX	
"Raise de Aou"	2016	YKBX	
"Sore wa Chiisana Hikari no Youna"	2016	YKBX	
"Anonymous"	2016	Yasuhiro Arafune	
"Furaregai Girl"	2016	Nao Yoshigai	
"Parallel Line"	2017	Yasuhiro Arafune	
"Birthday Song"	2017	Atsushi Tani	
"Jū-oku-nen"	2017	Tsuyoshi Inoue	
"Tsuki to Hanataba"	2018	Atsushi Tani	
"Reimei"	2018	—N/a	
"Kōkai no Uta"	2019	Kōsuke Sugimoto	
"Nejiko"	2020	Kozue Satō	
"Summer Bug"	2020	—N/a	
"Kamisama"	2021	Shusshin Katsushika	
"Sekai no Himitsu"	2021	Udon (original); Tsutomu Mita (collaboration)	
"Sanketsu Shōjo"	2022	Afghan Ray	

== Awards and nominations ==
Awards and nominations received by Sayuri
Award	Year	Category	Nominee	Result	Ref.
CD Shop Awards	2018	Grand Prize	Mikazuki no Koukai	Nominated	
Music Revolution	2012	Grand Prix	"Ru-Rararu-Ra-Rurararu-Ra"	Won	
Music Revolution	2012	Minister of Education, Culture, Sports, Science and Technology Award	"Ru-Rararu-Ra-Rurararu-Ra"	Won	
Newtype Anime Awards	2023	Best Theme Song	"Hana no Tō"	5th place	
Reiwa Anisong Awards	2022	Anime Song Grand Prize	"Hana no Tō"	Won	
Reiwa Anisong Awards	2022	Artist Song Award	"Hana no Tō"	Nominated	
Reiwa Anisong Awards	2022	User Vote Award	"Hana no Tō"	Won	
Space Shower Music Awards	2018	Best Breakthrough Artist	Sayuri	Nominated	
