= Scum's Wish =

Japanese manga series and its franchise

- Cover of the first manga volume, featuring Hanabi Yasuraoka

クズの本懐 (Kuzu no Honkai)
- Genre: Psychological; Romantic drama
- Manga
- Written by: Mengo Yokoyari
- Published by: Square Enix
- English publisher: NA: Yen Press
- Magazine: Monthly Big Gangan
- Original run: September 25, 2012 – March 25, 2017
- Volumes: 8
- Anime television series
- Directed by: Masaomi Ando
- Produced by: Naokado Fujiyama; Gō Wakabayashi; Shōta Komatsu
- Written by: Makoto Uezu
- Music by: Masaru Yokoyama
- Studio: Lerche
- Licensed by: AUS: Madman Entertainment; NA: Sentai Filmworks; UK: MVM Films
- Original network: Fuji TV, Kansai TV (Noitamina)
- Original run: January 12, 2017 – March 30, 2017
- Episodes: 12
- Television drama
- Directed by: Shogo Miyaki; Shunsuke Shinada
- Written by: Ere Hagiwara; Motoko Takahashi
- Music by: Yui Koichi
- Studio: Fuji Television
- Original network: Fuji TV
- Original run: January 18, 2017 – April 5, 2017
- Episodes: 12
- Manga

Kuzu no Honkai décor
- Written by: Mengo Yokoyari
- Published by: Square Enix
- Magazine: Big Gangan
- Original run: November 25, 2017 – May 25, 2018
- Volumes: 1
- icon

Scum's Wish (Japanese: クズの本懐, Hepburn: Kuzu no Honkai) is a Japanese manga series by Mengo Yokoyari. It was serialized in Square Enix's seinen manga magazine Monthly Big Gangan from September 2012 to March 2017, and has been collected in eight tankōbon volumes. An anime television series adaptation produced by Lerche aired between January and March 2017 on Fuji TV. A live-action television series aired from January to April 2017.

== Plot ==
High school student Hanabi Yasuraoka has been in love with Narumi Kanai, her older childhood friend who is now her homeroom teacher. But from the look in Narumi's eyes when he sees the new music teacher Akane Minagawa, Hanabi realizes that he is in love with Akane and not her. Hanabi meets Mugi Awaya, another student who is in love with Akane, who was his tutor when he was in middle school. Hanabi and Mugi make a pact and begin a fake relationship to satisfy each other's loneliness from their respective unrequited loves, both sexually and emotionally. They agree to not fall in love with each other and end the relationship if their love is returned from the people they are in love with.

== Characters ==
=== Main characters ===
Hanabi Yasuraoka (安楽岡 花火, Yasuraoka Hanabi)
Voiced by: Chika Anzai (Japanese); Avery Smithhart (English)
Played by: Miyu Yoshimoto
A high school student who is in love with Narumi. After finding out that Narumi is in love with Akane, Hanabi begins a fake relationship with Mugi to satisfy their mutual loneliness. She later enters into a physical relationship with her best friend Sanae, but the relationship ends after Sanae decides to give up on Hanabi. Hanabi then decides to quit her fake relationship with Mugi and goes on a different path to find her true love. In Décor, Hanabi hasn't moved on from her feelings of Mugi—despite being with lots of friends during their time apart—she still loves him. While working as a staff member at a concert venue, she sees Mugi again and the two of them accept each other's love and hold hands, possibly starting the genuine relationship the both of them had hoped for.
Mugi Awaya (粟屋 麦, Awaya Mugi)
Voiced by: Nobunaga Shimazaki (Japanese); Greg Cote, Katelyn Barr (young) (English)
Played by: Dori Sakurada
A high school student who is in love with Akane. He and Hanabi begin a fake relationship to satisfy each other's desires. In middle school, Mugi had already been in a secret relationship with his senior, Mei Hayakawa, who took his virginity since he was not able to confess his love to Akane. Mugi had always been aware of what kind of person Akane is, but loved her nevertheless. Later in the series, Mugi confesses to Akane and they go on a date. However, after the date, Mugi realizes that he cannot hold on to his ideal image of Akane he had and bids farewell to Akane with the hopes that he can finally move on from her. Later on, he's shown to have moved on after coming to a conclusion to end everything with Hanabi in order to pursue a better life and find true love. In Décor, Mugi still hasn't gotten over Hanabi despite having a multitude of sexual encounters with different women over the course of their time apart. Eventually, while daydreaming about Hanabi, he declines an invitation to have sex from a woman who approached him at his job, where he comes to the conclusion that Hanabi is the girl he wants. When he finally sees Hanabi again at a concert, he asks God to please let his relationship with her last this time and the two of them hold hands, possibly signifying that the two of them will start the relationship they had wanted.
Narumi Kanai (鐘井 鳴海, Kanai Narumi)
Voiced by: Kenji Nojima (Japanese); Adam Noble (English)
Played by: Kouki Mizuta
Hanabi's older childhood friend and neighbor who becomes her homeroom teacher in high school. His mother died when he was young, so he usually went to Hanabi's home for homemade meals. He is attracted to women with long hair, as they remind him of his mother. Even after knowing Akane's true nature, Narumi does not seem to mind and asks her to marry him, which she accepts.
Akane Minagawa (皆川 茜, Minagawa Akane)
Voiced by: Aki Toyosaki (Japanese); Maggie Flecknoe (English)
Played by: Rina Aizawa
A new music teacher who arrives at the school during Hanabi's freshman year. On the outside, she is a nice, well-behaved woman who is adored by her students, but she actually loves the feeling of winning a man's heart while directly hurting someone else who is in love with that man. She can also be considered a lonely person and a nymphomaniac. She attempts to seduce Narumi like her previous relationships, but she notices that Narumi refrains from touching her, unlike the men in her past, later realizing that he loves her. After Narumi asks her to marry him despite knowing her true nature, Akane begins to take interest in him.
Sanae Ebato (絵鳩 早苗, Ebato Sanae)
Voiced by: Haruka Tomatsu (Japanese); Molly Searcy (English)
Played by: Sarii Ikegami
Hanabi's friend and classmate. Sanae has been in love with Hanabi since she saved Sanae from a train molester. When Sanae has a sleepover at Hanabi's house, she impulsively kisses her and confesses her love in the process. The two then begin a physical relationship. Atsuya then questions Sanae on whether she is actually in love with Hanabi or just sexually attracted to her. After consideration, Sanae then gives up on Hanabi and attempts to end their friendship, although Hanabi refuses and says she wants to keep their friendship and will give Sanae space and time until she is ready to be friends again. Sanae later tells Atsuya that while she loves Hanabi, she is giving up on her and will start to trust him more. Later on, it is shown that Hanabi and Sanae reunite and get back to being mutual friends. Although the end of the original manga subtly hints that she may return the feelings of Atsuya someday, in Décor she has fully realized her homosexuality and begins a relationship with her university teacher Yuka.
Noriko Kamomebata (鴎端 のり子, Kamomebata Noriko)
Voiced by: Shiori Izawa (Japanese); Brittney Karbowski (English)
Played by: Shiho
Mugi's childhood friend who has been in love with him ever since someone told her that she and Mugi looked like a "prince" and "princess". She has been pursuing Mugi and trying to act and look like a princess because of the comment. She hates her own name and prefers to be called "Moka," abbreviated from "most kawaii." When she confesses her feelings to Mugi, Mugi takes advantage of her to pursue a physical relationship without returning her feelings. However, Mugi later realizes that Moka is special to him and he does not want to ruin her for his selfish needs; thus, their relationship ends.

=== Others ===
Atsuya Kirishima (桐嶋 篤也, Kirishima Atsuya)
Voiced by: Shintarō Asanuma (Japanese); Joe Daniels (English)
Played by: Takuya Negishi
Sanae's cousin who has romantic feelings for her. He questions Sanae about her relationship with Hanabi, asking her if she is really in love with Hanabi or is only sexually attracted to her. After Sanae decides to give up on Hanabi, she tells Atsuya that she will trust him more. In Décor, he again confesses his love for her after graduation and promises to be her support even if she rejects him, which makes Sanae depressed, since she highly appreciates his support, but can not reciprocate because of her lesbian orientation.
Mei Hayakawa (早川 芽衣, Hayakawa Mei)
Voiced by: Yukiyo Fujii (Japanese); Christina Kelly (English)
Played by: Shiori Yoshida
Mugi's senior at middle school. Mugi turned to her after being unable to initially confess to Akane and they had sex. Afterwards, Mei apologizes to Mugi for rushing him into having sex.
Takuya Terauchi (寺内 タクヤ, Terauchi Takuya)
Voiced by: Yūsuke Kobayashi (Japanese); Gabriel Regojo (English)
Played by: Hiroki Ino
One of Akane's former students who is in a physical relationship with her. Hanabi approaches him in an attempt to make Akane jealous, but she realizes that she is unable to repeat Akane's behavior.

== Media ==
=== Manga ===
Scum's Wish, written and illustrated by Mengo Yokoyari, began in Square Enix's Big Gangan magazine on September 25, 2012, and finished on March 25, 2017. That same day Square Enix simultaneously released the eighth and final tankōbon in a regular and a limited first edition.

The series was published digitally in English by Crunchyroll Manga and in print by Yen Press.

A spin-off manga titled Kuzu no Honkai décor ran in Big Gangan from November 25, 2017, to May 25, 2018. It was collected into one volume.

==== Volume list ====
No.	Original release date	Original ISBN	English release date	English ISBN
1	February 19, 2013	978-4-7575-3887-0	October 25, 2016	9780316463720
1. May My Wish Be Granted; 2. Only One; 3. Youth Survival Game; 4. High School Girl Lullaby; 5. Dreaming Girl; Side Story: Meow Meow Prelude
2	October 25, 2013	978-4-7575-4103-0	January 24, 2017	9780316463775
6. Your Warmth Is What I Seek; 7. Unhappy Refrain; 8. Prisoner of Love; 9. One-Sided Love, Finally; 10. Youthful Days; Side Story: Little Little Princess; Side Story: Meow Meow Serenade
3	April 25, 2014	978-4-7575-4264-8	April 18, 2017	9780316463782
11. No Way Out; 12. Show Me Love (Not a Dream); 13. Bad Apple!!; 14. Pure Love Delusion; 15. The Willful, Self-Indulgent Joke Called Love; 16. More Than Words; Side Story: Meow Meow Oratorio
4	November 19, 2014	978-4-7575-4467-3	July 18, 2017	9780316463799
17. Holiday; 18. Destruction Baby; 19. Romantic City Streets; 20. Night by Night by Night; 21. The Sparkle of Youth; 22. Somebody, the Sea; Side Story: Meow Meow Cantata
5	June 25, 2015	978-4-7575-4678-3	October 31, 2017	9780316463805
23. Fake It; 24. I Am a Musical Instrument; 25. Welcome to Dimension X 26. You and a Movie; 27. Helpless, My Love; 28. Laterality; Side Story: Meow Meow Andante
6	March 25, 2016	978-4-7575-4895-4	February 27, 2018	9780316416344
29. Lots of Love; 30. That Person You Love; 31. Sweet Refrain; 32. Ultra Soda; 33. Love Message; 34. It's Hell, but Who Cares?; 35. Everybody Is Lonely
7	December 24, 2016	978-4-7575-5199-2	May 22, 2018	9781975300173
36. Butterfly Swimmer; 37. Window; 38. Abandoned Ship; 39. You Become Either a Devil or a Girl; 40. Patchwork; 41. Not Yet Real Love
8	March 25, 2017	978-4-7575-5235-7	August 21, 2018	9781975300203
42. Fragrance and Shadow; 43. A Benevolent God; 44. Digital God; 45. Touch A 46. Paradoxical Zoo; 47. The Couple's Story

Volume 7.5, a fan book titled Ambivalent, covering the manga and the anime, was released by Square Enix on December 24, 2016.

=== Anime ===
An anime television series adaptation was announced in March 2016 to air on Fuji TV's Noitamina block beginning on January 12 and concluded on March 30, 2017. It was streamed exclusively by Amazon Prime Video in Japan and worldwide. The series is directed by Masaomi Andō and is animated at the studio Lerche with series composition by Makoto Uezu, character designs by Keiko Kurosawa and music by Masaru Yokoyama. The series ran for 12 episodes released across six Blu-ray/DVD volumes. The opening song is titled "Uso no Hibana" (嘘の火花; "Spark of A Lie") and is sung by 96neko (who later voiced Anne Faulkner in Paradox Live). The ending theme titled "Parallel Line" (平行線; "Heikousen") is sung by Sayuri. The anime has been licensed by Sentai Filmworks for digital and home video release. Madman Entertainment released the series on home video in Australia and New Zealand. MVM Entertainment acquired the series for home video in the United Kingdom and Ireland.

==== Episode list ====
No.	Title	Directed by	Original release date
1	"Make a Wish"; Transliteration: "Nozomi kanae tamae" (Japanese: 望み叶え給え)	Masaomi Andō	January 12, 2017
2	"I'm Here for That Warmth"; Transliteration: "Sono nukumori ni yō ga aru" (Japanese: そのぬくもりに用がある)	Yōhei Fukui	January 19, 2017
3	"Show Me Love (Not A Dream)"	Eiichi Kuboyama	January 26, 2017
4	"Bad Apple!!"	Yoshifumi Sasahara	February 2, 2017
5	"DESTRUCTION BABY"	Yasuhiro Minami	February 9, 2017
6	"Welcome to the X-Dimension"; Transliteration: "X jigen e yōkoso" (Japanese: X次元へようこそ)	Yoshito Hata	February 16, 2017
7	"LOTS OF LOVE"; Transliteration: "Ai wa Takusan (LOTS OF LOVE)" (Japanese: 愛はたくさん (LOTS OF LOVE))	Takuma Suzuki	February 23, 2017
8	"Sweet Refrain"	Toshiyuki Marukawa	March 2, 2017
9	"Butterfly Swimmer"	Yōhei Fukui	March 9, 2017
10	"Fragile and Empty"; Transliteration: "Kara no waremono" (Japanese: カラノワレモノ)	Yū Kinome	March 16, 2017
11	"A Kind God"; Transliteration: "Yasashii kami-sama" (Japanese: やさしいかみさま)	Yoshinaru Suzuki	March 23, 2017
12	"A Story of Two"; Transliteration: "Futari no Sutōrī" (Japanese: 2人のストーリー)	Yoshifumi Sasahara; Masaomi Andō	March 30, 2017

=== Live-action TV ===
A live-action TV series adaptation was announced in December 2016 and aired in twelve episodes on Fuji TV between January 18 and April 5, 2017.

== Reception ==
The manga had 1.9 million copies in print by November 2017.

The series ranked eleventh in the first Next Manga Award in the print manga category.
