= Tani Yuuki =

Japanese singer (born 1998)

- Born: November 9, 1998 (age 28); Chigasaki, Kanagawa, Japan
- Occupations: Singer; songwriter
- Musical career
- Origin: Japan
- Genre: J-pop
- Instruments: Vocals, guitar
- Years active: 2015–present
- Label: Valley Records
- Website: taniyuuki.com

Tani Yuuki (たにゆうき, Tani Yuuki; born November 9, 1998) is a Japanese male singer-songwriter from Chigasaki, Kanagawa.

== Early life and education ==
He started music activities in August 2015 after receiving an acoustic guitar from his grandfather when he was a junior high school student. In 2018, he became a member of the online Japanese musical group "Whitebox". He graduated from vocational school in March 2019.

== Career ==
Afterwards, he began posting songs mainly on social media platforms such as TikTok and YouTube. "Myra", which was posted in May 2020, gained a total number of streaming plays exceeding 100 million times. Tani was the featured artist of May 2021 for Billboard Japan and Tiktok's 'Next Fire' and invited to perform for their first episode.

In November 2022, he was nominated for the 'Best Newcomer Award' during the 64th Japanese Record Awards (supported by the Japanese Composers Association).

Tani Yuuki's 2022 album W/X/Y achieved 270 million streaming playbacks on TikTok. It has spent a consecutive 102 weeks on Billboard Japan's Hot 100 charts, peaking at number 3. It also spent 80 weeks on the Oricon Digital single charts, reaching a top ranking of 13.

Tani Yuuki recorded the new opening theme song for Edens Zero season 2, titled "Kaibutsu".

== Discography ==
=== Albums ===
- Memories (2021)
- Tamentai (多面態) (2023)
- Koukaishi (航海士) (2025)

=== Extended plays ===
- W/X/Y Remixes (2023)

=== Singles ===
- "Life Is Beautiful" (2020)
- "Myra" (2020)
- "Unreachable Love Song" (2021)
- "Night Butterfly" (2021)
- "W/X/Y" (2021)
- "Over the Time" (2021)
- "Freya" (2021)
- "Hyakki Yakou" (百鬼夜行) (2021)
- "Jibun Jishin" (自分自信) (2022)
- "Baku" (夢喰) (2022)
- "Mō Ichido" (もう一度) (2022)
- "Okaeri" (おかえり) (2022)
- "Sansantaruya" (燦々たるや) (2023)
- "W/X/Y – From The First Take" (2023)
- "Aikotoba – From The First Take" (愛言葉 – From The First Take) (2023)
- "Wonderland" (ワンダーランド) (2023)
- "Cheers" (2023)
- "Unmei" (運命) (2023)
- "Kaibutsu" (械物) (2023)
- "The Final Magic" (最後の魔法) (2023)

== Tours ==
- Tani Yuuki Tour 2021 "Over The Time" (2021)
- Tani Yuuki史上初の Hall Tour "kotodama" (2023)
