= Sarii Ikegami =

Japanese actress, model and idol

- 池上 紗理依
- Born: 19 October 1995 (age 29); Niigata Prefecture, Japan
- Occupations: Gravure idol; actress; model
- Agent: Anthem
- Height: 158 cm (5 ft 2 in)
- Awards: 2012 Miss Young Champion

Sarii Ikegami (池上 紗理依, Ikegami Sarii; born 19 October 1995) is a Japanese actress, model, and gravure idol who has acted in a number of films, television series, radio and theatre productions, as well as modelling for magazines and videos.

Born in Niigata Prefecture, she is represented with Anthem.

== Biography ==
She started acting from the age of nine. Since then, she belongs to her office from 2009 and made full-scale tarento activities. From 2011 she enrolled as a member of the idol group "Bless" until April 2013.

She won the 2012 Miss Young Champion Grand Prix.

After that she moved her activities to female magazines and served as a regular model of Tokuma Shoten's Larme.

She resumed gravure activities at the 49th issue of Weekly Playboy in 2016. In the same year Weekly Young Magazine's No. 51 was published, in which she appeared in a youth manga magazine for the first time in four years. In 2017, she appeared in the cover and top gravure of the ninth issue of Weekly Young Magazine. In both magazines she was published as a newcomer, but since her junior idol era and Miss Young Champion era, she has been analysed as a late bloom gravure idol.

She appeared on Young Champion's No. 8 cover in March 2017. It was written on the page as a "triumphant appearance."

== Personal life ==
She is good friends with Miyu Inamori and Ami Tomite, and they often appear on their blogs as well.

She has two elder brothers (six and three years older).

== Works ==
=== Image videos ===
- Hajimemashite Sarii Ikegami desu! (5 Feb 2010, Shibuya Music)
- Marshmallow Kinenbi 14-sai-chū 2 (4 Jun 2010, Shibuya Music)
- Boku no Taiyō (24 Dec 2010, Spice Visual)
- Boku no Kōhai wa Sarii-chan Sarii Ikegami 15-sai-chū 3 (14 Apr 2011, Silk)
- white -Menazashi- (24 Dec 2011, Orstack Soft Hanbai)
- Anniversarii (5 Feb 2010, BNS)
- Miss Young Champion 2012 (5 Feb 2010, E-Net Frontier)
- Sarii Smile (5 Feb 2010, Shinyusha)

== Appearances ==
=== Dramas ===
- 2015; CX Yōkoso, Wagaya e as Nakano Electronic Parts employee (regular)
- 2016; Hulu Debusen as Yaku Kan (regular); television version broadcast at NTV (Kanto Local)
- 2017; FOD Kuzu no Honkai as Sanae Ebato (regular); broadcast at Fuji TV (Kanto Local)
- 2017; EX Kyotaro Nishimura Travel Mystery 67 Hakone Kōyō—Satsui no Tabi as Sanae Sakagami
- 2018; Bungaku Shojo; as Tanizaki Kyoka
- 2018; Silent Voice; as Mari Kido

=== Films ===
- Kuchisake Onna; Director: Koji Shiraishi
- 2010; Hatano-gumi SP: Episode V
- 2013; Miss Yang Chang Academy - Iidabashi Girls High School ~Todoke! Otome no Omoi~ Kiss-bu; Director: Yoji Unno (as Sarii)
- 2017; Itazurana Kiss The Movie: Campus; as Ayako Matsumoto
- 2018; Soratobu Tire; as Kadota's girlfriend
- 2018; Inuyashiki; as Misaki Matsubara

=== Radio ===
- 3 Apr 2017 –; FM-Niigata77.5 Pikaichi presents Beauty Diary (Mon–Thu 21:55– (5-minute programme) OA!)

=== Television ===
- 19 Apr, 16 May 2016; EX Zenryoku-zaka Awajizaka; Kichirōzaka
- 24 Apr 2017; CX Tsūkai TV Sukatto Japan Mune Kyuns Sukatto ~Hoshi ni Negai o…~ as Terumi Sakamoto
- 29 May 2017; CX Tsūkai TV Sukatto Japan Mune Kyuns Sukatto ~Jibun ni Uchikate! Kyūdō-bu~ as Misaki Hamada

=== Theatre ===
- Happy Go Unlucky: Tsuki-gumi as Shinju Nogura (12–16 Oct 2011; Ikebukuro Theater Kassai)
- Pajama de Ojama~Kōshū Joshi Ryō Monogatari (28–30 Apr 2012; Takadanobaba Rabinest)
- Utsuke: Kako-hen: Ichiya as Garasha Hosokawa (12–15 Feb 2015; Ikebukuro Theatre Green Big Tree Theatre)
- Happy Go Unlucky as Ruri (17–22 Jun 2015; Geki Underground Liberty)
- Kokoro wa Kodokuna Atom; starring: as Girl Ayako (22, 24, 25 Oct 2015; Ikebukuro Theatre Green Big Tree Theatre/14, 15 Nov 2015 Osaka ABC Hall)

=== Magazines ===
- Fashion magazine Larme regular model
- Free newspaper Midka; front page; 1 Feb 2015
- Released 17 Mar 2015 No. 15—Regular Larme ~Sweet Girl Artbook~
- Released 17 Mar 2015 No. 15 Larme ~Sweet Girl Artbook~ Hair Arrange plan–Beauty feature
- Released 17 Mar 2015 No. 16 Larme ~Sweet Girl Artbook~ New Models–Yukata Hair Arrange
- Released 17 Mar 2015 No. 17 Larme ~Sweet Girl Artbook~ Hair Catalogue plan–Prefecture Snap plan
- 20 Jun, 20 Sep 2015 Digital Camera Magazine Issues July, September
- 23 Jun, 23 Jul 2015 Soup Issues August, September
- 20 Nov 2015 LuRe First Issue
- 20 Dec 2015 Photo Technique Digital January Issue
- 20 Jan 2016 Photo Technique Digital February Issue
- 19 Mar 2016 Young Magazine No. 16; End Gravure
- 9 May 2016 Young Magazine No. 23; End Gravure
- 20 May 2016 Monthly Young Magazine No. 6; End Gravure
- 1 Aug 2016 Young Magazine No. 35; End Gravure
- 21 Nov 2016 Young Magazine No. 51; End Gravure
- 21 Nov 2016 Weekly Playboy No.49; Gravure
- 28 Nov 2016 #girl Magazine
- 30 Jan 2017 Young Magazine No. 9; Cover & Top Feature Gravure
- 17 Feb 2017 Young Gangan Gravure in progress
- 25 Feb 2017 Big Gangan gravure
- 19 Jun 2017 Weekly Playboy No.27; Gravure
- 20 Jun 2017 Digital Camera Magazine: Weekend Girl July Issue

=== Stage shows ===
- 5th Teens Collection; Maihama Amphitheater; 23 Mar 2015; Fashion show appearance .
- 2nd Flying summer; KFC; 2 May 2015; Fashion show appearance

=== Others ===
- Daiichi Kosho Company "Karaoke Sentai Utaunger"

== Publications ==
=== Calendars ===
- Sarii Ikegami 2018-Nen Calendar (2017, Try-X)
