= Edens Zero =

Japanese manga series by Hiro Mashima

- First tankōbon volume cover, featuring Shiki Granbell (right), Rebecca Bluegarden (lower left), and Happy (upper left)
- Genre: Adventure; Science fantasy
- Manga
- Written by: Hiro Mashima
- Published by: Kodansha
- English publisher: NA: Kodansha USA
- Imprint: Shōnen Magazine Comics
- Magazine: Weekly Shōnen Magazine
- Original run: June 27, 2018 – June 26, 2024
- Volumes: 33
- Anime television series
- Directed by: Shinji Ishihira (Chief); Yūji Suzuki (S1); Toshinori Watabe (S2)
- Written by: Mitsutaka Hirota
- Music by: Yoshihisa Hirano
- Studio: J.C.Staff
- Licensed by: Netflix (streaming rights; S1); Mediatoon Distribution (S2)
- Original network: NNS (Nippon TV)
- Original run: April 11, 2021 – October 1, 2023
- Episodes: 50
- Video games
- Edens Zero Pocket Galaxy (2022); Rebecca and the Mechanical Mansion (2022); Edens Zero (2025)
- icon

Edens Zero (stylized in all caps) is a Japanese manga series written and illustrated by Hiro Mashima. It was serialized in Kodansha's Weekly Shōnen Magazine from June 2018 to June 2024, with its chapters collected into thirty-three tankōbon volumes. Set in a fictional spacefaring universe, the story follows Shiki Granbell, a boy with gravity powers who embarks on a voyage aboard the titular starship in search of a cosmic entity named Mother.

The manga was published digitally in six other languages as they were released in Japan, with Kodansha USA licensing the series for English publication in North America on Crunchyroll Manga, Comixology, Amazon Kindle, and K Manga. An anime television series adaptation produced by J.C.Staff aired from April to October 2021. A second season aired from April to October 2023. A video game adaptation by Konami was also released in July 2025.

== Plot ==
Shiki Granbell, a human boy, lives among robots on the deserted theme park planet Granbell in the Sakura Cosmos. His adoptive grandfather, the benevolent "Demon King" robot Ziggy, teaches him to control gravity with a superhuman power called Ether Gear. Ten years after Ziggy's death, the park is visited by spacefaring content creators Rebecca Bluegarden and Happy, whom Shiki befriends when the dying robots force the three off Granbell before expending their vital Ether energy.

Seeking new friends and adventure, the three set out in search of Mother, the fabled goddess of the cosmos. Early in Shiki's voyage, the space pirate Elsie Crimson gifts him with Ziggy's interstellar warship, Edens Zero. Shiki assembles a crew from Ziggy's android companions, the Four Shining Stars, as well as others he befriends: Weisz Steiner, a criminal and technopath from an alternate history created by a time-eating Chronophage; E.M. Pino, Ziggy's memory-impaired EMP android; and Homura Kôgetsu, a young swordswoman and pupil of the deceased Shining Star Valkyrie Yuna. Meanwhile, Rebecca discovers her own Ether Gear ability to reverse time and travel between parallel universes, which she uses to save Shiki after he is killed by the crime lord Drakken Joe.

Before leaving the Sakura Cosmos, the Edens Zero crew encounters a revived, malevolent Ziggy, who wishes for machines to rule the universe by ensuring Mother's death in the near future, which would trigger an extinction event for all human life. Captaining Edens One, an upgraded version of Edens Zero, Ziggy draws Shiki's crew into a war with the neighboring Aoi Cosmos's empire, where he detonates the empire's arsenal of 20,000 antimatter bombs to kill them. Shiki leads his crew to escape, although the Shining Star Witch Regret sacrifices herself to shield Edens Zero from the explosion.

Following a three-year conflict in the Kaede Cosmos, Shiki discovers Ziggy's identity as his own alternate self who tried stopping the bombs, an act resulting in his and Rebecca's Ether Gear creating a spacetime distortion that sent them 20,000 years into the future. Ziggy reveals that Edens Zero was built for him to prevent Mother's multiversal deaths by using Etherion—the ship's secret time travel function made from the future Rebecca's Ether—to reach Universe Zero, the convergence point of all universes. Pino realizes Ziggy is being controlled when he discreetly repairs her memory, allowing her to access an empowered Overdrive state and free him with her EMP. At Ziggy's urging, Shiki destroys him to thwart his controller, the artificially intelligent Edens One.

With Mother's death imminent, the crew activates Etherion, which imparts their memories and abilities onto their past selves in Universe Zero. Upon recalling their future, they find Universe Zero to be an idyllic world where Witch, Valkyrie, Ziggy, and many other deceased figures are alive, and various misfortunes such as the Granbell robots' Ether shortage have never occurred. Edens Zero traces Mother from the Yukino Cosmos into uncharted space, where Ziggy aids the crew in battle against Edens One and its new android host, Over Nu Etherion Void.

When Shiki reaches Mother, she reveals herself as the Overdrive form of planet Earth, Shiki's homeworld, which was transformed to prevent the planet's ruin 20,000 years ago. Learning that simply restoring Mother's power would undo the survival of those who died in previous universes, including himself, Shiki instead lures the Chronophage to revert Mother to her planetary state, inspired by an identical event that allowed Ziggy to discover the infant Shiki on Earth. While Edens Zero and Ziggy destroy Edens One and Void, Shiki successfully restores Earth and vanquishes the Chronophage by appeasing the monster's true form, the amnesiac future Rebecca. The crew disbands after helping revitalize Earth with their technology, later gathering on Granbell for the birth of Shiki and Rebecca's daughter.

== Production ==
Following the conclusion of his series Fairy Tail on July 26, 2017, Hiro Mashima posted a Tweet on December 31, 2017, promising to start a new series sometime in 2018. After his visit to the Angoulême International Comics Festival in France, Mashima revealed that the new series would be "a new form of fantasy", and that the character Plue from his earlier series Rave Master would appear in the manga. On May 14, 2018, Mashima commented on Twitter that he was becoming "a little confused" due to working simultaneously on this series, a Fairy Tail continuation, and another "secret" project. He also stated that he was coming up with new ideas for the series "one after another". On May 30, 2018, Weekly Shōnen Magazine revealed that the series was tentatively titled Eden's Zero. Although the title is the name of the main characters' spaceship, Mashima revealed that he thought of a deeper meaning for it, but that its usage would depend on future developments of the story.

When developing the idea for his next series, Mashima originally anticipated using another sword and sorcery setting similar to his previous manga, but decided on creating a "space fantasy" adventure due to a lack of such contemporary shōnen manga; he coined the term "space fantasy" from his own misinterpretation of "SF", the abbreviation of science fiction in Japan, as a child. He also cited the genre's unpopularity in shōnen manga as an influence, viewing it as a challenge he wanted to overcome. Mashima has described his approach to writing Edens Zero as being in between those of Rave Master and Fairy Tail, combining predetermined story elements with ideas that he draws "just from momentum" while writing on a weekly basis to give the manga a "real time" feeling. He also expressed an intention to end Edens Zero when its number of collected volumes is in between those of the two previous series. In 2021, Mashima stated that Edens Zero would continue the themes of friendship, family, and battles from Fairy Tail, but that it may change slightly by the end when the mystery of the character Mother is revealed.

== Media ==
=== Manga ===
Edens Zero is written and illustrated by Hiro Mashima. The series began in Kodansha's shōnen manga magazine Weekly Shōnen Magazine on June 27, 2018, and ended on June 26, 2024. Kodansha has collected its chapters into thirty-three individual tankōbon volumes released from September 14, 2018, through August 16, 2024.

The series was published simultaneously in seven languages: English, French, Chinese, Korean, Thai, German and Brazilian Portuguese. North American publisher Kodansha USA has released chapters of the series on digital platforms such as Crunchyroll Manga and Amazon Kindle. This was replaced with the K Manga app service that was released on May 10, 2023.

=== Anime ===
On June 12, 2020, Mashima announced on Twitter that the manga would be adapted into an anime television series. At the Tokyo Game Show livestream on September 26, 2020, it was revealed that the anime would be produced by J.C.Staff and directed by Yūji Suzuki, with Shinji Ishihira serving as chief director, Mitsutaka Hirota overseeing scripts, Yurika Sako designing the characters, and Yoshihisa Hirano composing the music. The series aired on Nippon Television and other channels from April 11 to October 3, 2021. (Note: The series premiered on April 10, 2021, at 24:55 (effectively, April 11 at 12:55 a.m. JST).) Netflix acquired streaming rights to the series, which was released globally on August 26, 2021. The opening theme is "Eden Through the Rough" by Takanori Nishikawa, and the ending theme is "Bōken no Vlog" (Note: 冒険のVLOG; lit. "A Vlog of the Journey") by CHiCO with HoneyWorks. The second opening theme is "Forever" by L'Arc-en-Ciel, and the second ending theme is "Sekai no Himitsu" (Note: 世界の秘密; lit. "Secret of the World") by Sayuri.

Director Yūji Suzuki died on September 9, 2021, before the series' broadcast was completed. Although he had worked in the industry as a key animator and episode director since the mid-2000s, Edens Zero was the first and only full series Suzuki directed.

On February 9, 2022, it was announced that the series would receive a second season, which aired from April 2 to October 1, 2023, (Note: The series premiered on April 1, 2023, at 24:55 (effectively, April 2 at 12:55 a.m. JST).) with Toshinori Watanabe replacing Suzuki as the director. The opening theme is "Never say Never" by Takanori Nishikawa, and the ending theme is "Rinne" (Note: リンネ; lit. "Reincarnation Cycle") by Asca. The second opening theme of season 2 is "Kaibutsu" (Note: 械物; a Japanese portmanteau of kai (械; "machine") and kaibutsu (怪物; "monster")) performed by Tani Yuuki, and the second ending theme is "My Star" by Lozareena. The second season was licensed internationally by Mediatoon Distribution and streamed by Crunchyroll in various regions. A 72-minute recap original net animation of the first season aired in Japan on the same day as the second-season premiere, and was streamed by Crunchyroll on April 29, 2023.

=== Video games ===
On September 16, 2020, Konami announced that they were developing an Edens Zero video game. It was later revealed at the Tokyo Game Show 2020 livestream that two separate action role-playing games were being developed, one being a 3D game for consoles, and the other being a top-down game for mobile devices. In February 2022, the latter was revealed as Edens Zero Pocket Galaxy and was released on February 24 for iOS and Android. The game ended its service on February 29, 2024. In October 2024, the 3D game for consoles was revealed and titled Edens Zero. The game was released for PlayStation 5, Windows, and Xbox Series X/S on July 15, 2025.

On December 17, 2021, Mashima announced that he was developing an Edens Zero video game by himself using RPG Maker. Describing it as a "hobby project" that he worked on in his free time. He released the game, Rebecca and the Mechanical Mansion, (Note: レベッカと機械ノ洋館, Rebekka to Kikai no Yōkan) for free on PC on March 16, 2022.

== Reception ==
=== Sales ===
In Japan, the first volume of Edens Zero reached 13th place on the weekly Oricon chart with 30,178 copies sold. The second volume ranked 16th with 41,506 copies sold, and the third volume at 18th place with 31,316 copies.

=== Critical response ===
The first volume received a mixed response from critics on Anime News Network, where it was rated on a 1 to 5 scale. Amy McNulty gave the volume a 3.5 rating, calling it a "solid start" and praising the story's pacing, characters, and art, while adding that it "may not blow anyone away". McNulty also commented on Mashima's similar visual and design choices to Fairy Tail – which she noted could be taken negatively – but opined that the manga could benefit from readers' familiarity with Fairy Tail, and found it accessible to new readers of Mashima's work. Rebecca Silverman, who also rated it 3.5, considered the manga to be Mashima's darkest work, and praised him for using themes that "helped make his previous series Fairy Tail work so well", citing Shiki and Rebecca's complementary backgrounds as orphans as an example. However, she expressed slight concerns over the story potentially becoming confusing for readers with the volume's implications of time travel and flash-forward cliffhanger. Faye Hopper, who gave the volume a 3 rating, found that the shift from "high fantasy pastiche to Star Wars reminiscent sci-fi" helped enrich the story, but criticized Mashima's humor and adherence to shōnen manga conventions. Teresa Navarro gave it a 2 rating, finding the characters and art style to be nearly identical to those in Fairy Tail, but considering its potential to gain a cult following from fans of the shōnen genre.

== Notes ==
General

Translations
