= The World God Only Knows season 1 =

The World God Only Knows
- Season 1
- No. of episodes: 12

Release
- Original network: TV Tokyo
- Original release: October 6 – December 22, 2010

Season chronology
- Next → Season 2

The World God Only Knows is an anime series based on the manga series of the same name by Tamiki Wakaki. It was produced by Manglobe and directed by Shigehito Takayanagi. The series follows the exploits of Keima Katsuragi, an intelligent, gloomy teenager who is known on the Internet as "The God of Conquest" for his legendary skills to "conquer" any girl in Bishōjo games, yet does not like girls in real life, where he is known as the Otamegane (オタメガネ), a derogatory portmanteau of the two words otaku (オタク) and Megane (メガネ, lit. glasses). One day, out of pride, he accidentally accepts what he assumes to be a challenge for a Bishōjo game when in reality he has accepted a contract from a bumbling demoness named Elsie who asks for his help in capturing runaway spirits from Hell who are hiding in the hearts of girls. The only way to force the spirits out of the girls hearts is by replacing the spirits in the girls' hearts with himself (metaphorically speaking) by making the girls fall in love with him, much to Keima's horror. With the threat of death for both of them should he refuse, Keima has no choice but to help Elsie. Together with his intelligence and knowledge of the dating sim genre and Elsie's magical powers, Keima is about to embark on his greatest challenge. It aired from October 6, 2010 to December 22, 2010.

Four pieces of theme music were used for the first season. The opening theme, titled "God Only Knows", is performed by Elisa under the name "Oratorio The World God Only Knows" and the ending theme song is "Koi no Shirushi" (コイノシルシ, lit. "The Proof of Love") by "The Groove Party God Only Knows" (神のみぞ知り隊, Kami nomi zo Shiri-tai) which is composed of the first season's voice actresses, Kanae Itō, Ayana Taketatsu, Aoi Yūki, Nao Tōyama and Kana Hanazawa, who each sing a solo version of the ending theme song with the rest as back-up. Additionally, three special ending theme songs were used, the first, "Tatta Ichi Do no Kiseki" (たった一度の奇跡, lit. "Just One Miracle at a Time") by Tomo Sakurai in episode 4, the second, "Happy Crescent" by Nao Tōyama in episode 7, and the third, "Shūseki Kairo no Yume Tabibito" (集積回路の夢旅人, lit. "The Dream Traveler of the Integrated Circuit") by Hiro Shimono and Oratorio The World God Only Knows in episode 12.

== Episodes ==
| No. | Title (Note: Title of the episode: literally translated, romanized using Hepburn romanization, and in kanji form) | Original release date (Note: Date the episode originally aired on TV Tokyo) |
|---|---|---|
| 1 | "Flag.1.0 Love Makes the World Go 'Round"; Transliteration: "Sekai wa ai de Ugoite Iru" (Japanese: Flag.1.0 世界はアイで動いている) | October 6, 2010 |
Keima Katsuragi is known on the internet for his ability to capture any girl in any bishōjo game, although the girls in real life do not appeal to him. He accidentally accepts a contract with a demon named Elcea de Rux Ima, or Elsie, who wants his help in capturing evil spirits that have escaped from hell and have hidden themselves in girls' hearts. Keima must find a way to make girls fall in love with him in order to force these spirits out, or else both of them will be killed by the magical collars on their necks if the contract is broken. His first target is his classmate named Ayumi Takahara, training for the upcoming track-and-field race. Keima cheers her on by displaying banners using Elsie's magical raiment at the school field each day. When Ayumi is annoyed by his actions, Keima believes she will eventually grow to like him. After a confrontation with jealous upperclasswomen, Ayumi sprains her leg the day before the meet. However, this injury was realized to be a fake since she has doubted her confidence. Keima consoles Ayumi, saying for her to believe in herself. They kissed when Ayumi helps Keima from falling down the stairs, forcing the loose spirit out of her body and allowing Elsie to capture it. Ayumi won the race but lost all of her memories with Keima, she blushes when Keima congratulates her. Much to his confusion, Elsie has transferred to his school, claiming to be his sister.
| 2 | "Flag.2.0 Demon of a Sister"; Transliteration: "Akumademo Imouto desu" (Japanese: Flag.2.0 あくまでも妹です) | October 13, 2010 |
Keima is dismayed upon learning from Elsie that there are many more runaway spirits within the city. After meeting Mari Katsuragi, Keima’s mother, Elsie claims to be her “husband’s illegitimate daughter”, though this causes Mari to snap during a phone conversation with her husband for his “infidelity”. Keima refuses to accept Elsie as his little sister, since she does not fit the criteria in his view. However, upon hearing her story on wanting to be successful just like her older sister, Haqua, Keima reluctantly accepts Elsie as his sister. During lunch at a popular sobawa sandwich stall, Keima and Elsie found their next target, Mio Aoyama, a rich girl who proceeds to buy all of the yakisoba sandwiches. Keima believes she is an easy target as she has all the characteristics of a tsundere, and a love confession might break her hard shell. Unfortunately, the confession does not work as planned, and Mio has her chauffeur to beat Keima. As Keima and Elsie follow Mio to her home, they are surprised to learn Mio was poor as she lives in a shabby apartment.
| 3 | "Flag.3.0 Drive My Car"; Transliteration: "Doraivu Mai Kā" (Japanese: Flag.3.0 ドライヴ・マイ・カー) | October 20, 2010 |
Keima and Elsie overhear from the chauffeur that Mio is no longer rich since her father has died and her mother has been working hard to make ends meet. The chauffeur leaves in disgust after the proud Mio refuses to stop pretending to be rich. Mio catches Keima snooping around and quickly goes back to her apartment. Since Keima is the only one to know her secret, he can use it to get closer with her. Keima becomes Mio's new chauffeur by biking her to school in various elaborate bike carriages made by Elsie’s raiment each day. As he eventually gets tired of driving her to school, Mio almost tempts to whip him, briefly making her smile, but quickly reverts to her cold expression and goes home. Keima now begins the next stage of his plan by bringing her to a grand ball by invitation. At the ball, Mio is upset that Keima brought them to the mansion gardens, but Keima gets her to teach him how to dance. However, after encountering a few noblemen who look down on Mio’s current status, Keima finally tells her that she should stop pretending to be rich as an act to look up to her deceased father, convincing her to let go of the past and move on and live her own life. Keima kisses Mio and the spirit from her body is captured by Elsie. The next day, Keima and Elsie meet Mio, now without any memories of Keima, who has a change of attitude and has accepted her family's status and burns incense for her late father. However, she still acts proud.
| 4 | "Flag.4.0 On a Crusade"; Transliteration: "Ima Soko ni Aru Seisen" (Japanese: Flag.4.0 今そこにある聖戦) | October 27, 2010 |
Keima attempts to finish and get the heroine, Sora Asuka from a bishōjo game named "Crayon". But the game has many bugs, including one that loops a previous scene over and over again. Not making things any better is the fact saving the game only crashes it and the game company that made it is now bankrupt thus there are no patches to fix the game. In order to avoid the bug loop and finish the game, Keima forcefully enlists a reluctant Elsie to help record the choices that he made in the game. Elsie is at first confused on why Keima takes the game seriously but soon respect his dedication to help the girls in his games just like the girls he helps in real life. After many attempts, Keima finally manages to avoid the loop bug and goes to the next scene but unexpectedly gets into another bug, resolving him to try again much to Elsie's horror. An article about "Crayon" reveals a rumor that someone managed to get the ending, hinting that Keima was able to finish the game.
| 5 | "Flag.5.0 IDOL BOMB!!" | November 3, 2010 |
Elsie has become a fan of the popular teen idol Kanon Nakagawa. However, Keima shows no interest in her, explaining the flaws of idols in real life compare to video game heroines. Unknown to both of them, Kanon just so happens to be a classmate of their class and is coming back to school. When Kanon meets Keima on the school roof garden, she is shocked and depressed to learn Keima has no idea who she is and proceeds to tase him repeatedly. Elsie detects an evil spirit inside of Kanon, being Keima's next target. Kanon vows to make Keima acknowledge her and make him her fan by holding a private concert just for him, but Keima ignores her, as he believes it is a trap as boys should be chasing girls and not the other way around. The next day, Kanon holds another concert for Keima which he ignores again. A sad Kanon suddenly starts to disappear in front of Keima and Elsie.
| 6 | "Flag.6.0 I’m Ordinary?"; Transliteration: "Watashi Heibon?" (Japanese: Flag.6.0 ワタシ平凡?) | November 10, 2010 |
Keima and Elsie realize that Kanon is actually turning invisible because of the spirit inside of her and manages to stop Kanon from tasing him again by praising her song. As Keima sends Elsie to investigate, they learn Kanon was once a member of the pop idol group Citron before they disbanded and has never played any songs from her old band. Kanon's need for attention was the result of people not noticing her in the past. Keima later receives an email from Kanon and cheers up the depressed Kanon at her television shoot. Kanon continues sending Keima an obsessive number of emails to visit her whenever she feels down. With the relationship going smoothly, Keima agrees to come to Kanon's Christmas Eve concert at Narusawa Seaside Hall, where she will perform in front of 10,000 people. On the day of the concert, Kanon is again nowhere to be found, and Keima knows it is time to go to the final stage of his plans to capture Kanon's heart.
| 7 | "Flag.7.0 Shining Star" | November 17, 2010 |
As Kanon prepares for her concert, she soon gets second thoughts and fears that she will mess up and be forgotten again causing her to turn invisible. She leaves the stadium which sends the backstage staff looking for her. As the concert draws near, Keima finally finds Kanon at a nearby building. Keima knows why Kanon fears being unnoticed, telling her not to seek attention as proof as an idol, since her hard work to become one was the proof all along. With his encouragement and her fans cheering for her, Kanon kisses Keima, which causes the loose spirit in her to leave and be captured by Elsie. Kanon returns to the stadium and receives letters of congratulations for her progress thus far from her two former bandmates, Yuri and Lime. She goes up on stage and gives an amazing performance to the large crowd. As Keima and Elsie leave, he tells her his views on idols has not changed, but said Kanon not as an idol, but a shining star.
| 8 | "Flag.8.0 Coupling With, With, With..." | November 24, 2010 |
This episode features four different perspectives happening on the same day. Elsie is angry that Keima called her useless for making his "lunch", due to having bizarre ingredients that are still alive. After her friend Chihiro Kosaka advises her on how to impress Keima, Elsie decides to make a strawberry cake for him. Unfortunately, she misunderstands the recipe instructions and mistakenly uses hellish ingredients instead of normal ones, causing many accidents including releasing a mandragon and blowing up the home economics classroom. At the same time, Keima irritates his English teacher Ichiro Kodama, who dislikes the fact Keima constantly plays games during class yet still manages to get perfect scores on tests. After getting into an argument with Keima about this at gym class, Kodama is chased by the mandragon. The mandragon eventually arrives at the Katsuragi residence, where it drops Elsie's cake. Keima returns home and finds Elsie's cake and eats it out of guilt. However, because he was hiding, Mari mistakes him for a thief and hits him on the head with a vase. Kodama arrives at the Katsuragi residence for his meeting with Mari, but sees the mandragon get eaten by the "lunch" that Elsie made earlier, scaring him away. Elsie returns home and vows to make another cake for Keima. Despite having eaten the cake, he tells her that he does not like sweets, much to her chagrin.
| 9 | "Flag.9.0 Inside & Outside the Big Wall"; Transliteration: "Ōki na Kabe no Naka to Soto" (Japanese: Flag.9.0 大きな壁の中と外) | December 1, 2010 |
Keima orders Elsie to go to the school library to learn modern human history after learning her knowledge about human history is two centuries out of date. Instead, she becomes fascinated on a book about fire trucks. When she looks for more books about fire trucks, she asks one of the librarians, Shiori Shiomiya and detects a spirit inside of her. After bringing Keima to the library, the two are amazed that Shiori managed to find 458 books related to fire trucks. While Keima thinks Shiori used the library index, Shiori, deep in thought, wants to tell him she was able to find them as she remembered all the books she reads in the library but is too shy to speak up. The next day, Shiori arranges the books in the library and explains her love for books. Keima is aware how shy librarian girls like her are easy to figure out as they are a common character in games, but unlike games where he can read what the character is thinking, finding out what Shiori is thinking might be more difficult. As Shiori removes some books to be disposed of and laments to herself about their fate, Keima helps her get one book she cannot reach. Shiori tries to think on how to thank him but fumbles in her words while thanking him.
| 10 | "Flag.10.0 Inside of Me..."; Transliteration: "Atashi no Naka no ......" (Japanese: Flag.10.0 あたしの中の……) | December 8, 2010 |
Shiori is embarrassed on what she said and tries to leave, but when Keima comments on why books are useless nowadays, with much courage and anger, she verbally calls him stupid before quickly leaving. Keima later reveals to Elsie that he is purposely angering Shiori in order for her to speak up. It is revealed Shiori has been unable to speak normally to people due to her shyness, so she has been exploring various books to compensate for this. The next day, the library committee has decided to add a media room to the library. Shiori tries to give her opinion to the committee but is too shy to speak up. Later, she catches Keima writing in one of the library books which he justifies that he was making corrections and comments how books cannot instantly be corrected, upsetting Shiori. The next afternoon, she catches Keima doing it again only to realize he is scribbling in his own book. In anger and confusion, she starts thinking out loud without realizing it until Keima points it out. The next day after that, Keima introduces himself to Shiori and talks about the library, now that she is speaking normally to him. With Shiori now speaking up, Keima decides it is time to capture her heart after finding a library notice to dispose library books for the media room.
| 11 | "Flag.11.0 The Last Day"; Transliteration: "Oshimai no Hi" (Japanese: Flag.11.0 おしまいの日) | December 15, 2010 |
Shiori locks herself in and barricades the library to prevent the library committee from disposing of books for the media room. As the committee tries to get inside, Shiori falls asleep and dreams how her love for books began until she is awoken by Keima, who manages to enter the library through a hole at the rooftop made by Elsie with her raiment. Keima has come to support Shiori in her protest and stays close to her. The library committee cuts the electricity to the library, surprising Shiori and causes some books to fall over them. As she hugs Keima, Shiori tells him that only he understands her love for books and reasons for protecting them. However, Keima calls her a liar, saying that she did not barricade herself to protect her books, instead herself to the world. Keima already knew that she always wanted to socialize, but her fears of being misunderstood prevented that, which is why she reads books as an escape from the real world. Troubled with this revelation, Shiori feels unsure on what to do until Keima drags her out of the rubble of books, telling her that he will give her courage and kisses her, which releases the loose spirit from her body allowing Elsie to capture it. As the library committee enters the library, Shiori finally speaks up for herself and explains her reasons which the committee agrees to have a meeting. In the epilogue, Shiori feels like she has forgotten someone who was with her during her protest so she writes a story on what she remembers.
| 12 | "Flag.12.0 More Than a God, Less Than a Human"; Transliteration: "Kami Ijou, Ningen Miman" (Japanese: Flag.12.0 神以上、人間未満) | December 22, 2010 |
Due to helping Elsie capture spirits, Keima has gathered a large backlog of new games he has not played yet. During the weekend, he plans to finish all the games in his room by playing six games at the same time, doing so with impressive speed while still managing to logically make the right choices and enjoy each game individually, but he suffers from burnout later on. Elsie finds this shocking yet bewildering and leaves him alone. Realizing he cannot finish all of his games at this pace, Keima decides to up the ante by playing twenty-four games at once. Keima finally manages to finish all of his backlog games except one as he is too tired to continue, but he soon starts hallucinating that all of the game girls he captured are encouraging him to not give up. Rejuvenated, he finally finishes the last game and "follows" his game girls into the game world where they all sing and dance together. The episode ends with an announcement for the second season of the anime and a new character introduced.
