= The World God Only Knows II =

- No. of episodes: 12

Release
- Original network: TV Tokyo
- Original release: April 11 – June 28, 2011

Season chronology
- ← Previous; Season 1 Next → Season 3

The second season of The World God Only Knows, titled The World God Only Knows II, is an anime series based on the manga series of the same name by Tamiki Wakaki. It was produced by Manglobe and directed by Satoshi Ōsedo. The series follows the exploits of Keima Katsuragi, an intelligent, gloomy teenager who is known on the Internet as "The God of Conquest" for his legendary skills to "conquer" any girl in Bishōjo games, yet does not like girls in real life, where he is known as the Otamegane (オタメガネ), a derogatory portmanteau of the two words otaku (オタク) and Megane (メガネ, lit. glasses). One day, out of pride, he accidentally accepts what he assumes to be a challenge for a Bishōjo game when in reality he has accepted a contract from a bumbling demoness named Elsie who asks for his help in capturing runaway spirits from Hell who are hiding in the hearts of girls. The only way to force the spirits out of the girls hearts is by replacing the spirits in the girls' hearts with himself (metaphorically speaking) by making the girls fall in love with him, much to Keima's horror. With the threat of death for both of them should he refuse, Keima has no choice but to help Elsie. Together with his intelligence and knowledge of the dating sim genre and Elsie's magical powers, Keima is about to embark on his greatest challenge. It aired from April 11, 2011, to June 28, 2011.

Three pieces of theme music are used for the second season. The opening theme is titled "A Whole New World God Only Knows" and is performed by Elisa and LIA under the name "Oratorio The World God Only Knows" and the ending theme song is "Ai no Yokan" (アイノヨカン, lit. "Premonition Of Love") performed by "The Groove Party God Only Knows" which this time is composed of the second season's voice actresses, Itō, Saori Hayami, Ami Koshimizu, Kana Asumi and Aki Toyosaki. A special version of "Ai no Yokan" (アイノヨカン, lit. "Premonition Of Love") performed by Itō and Hayami is used as the ending theme for episodes 16 and 20. For the 24th episode uses the first season's theme song as its ending theme.

== Episodes ==
| No. overall | No. in season | Title (Note: Title of the episode: literally translated, romanized using Hepburn romanization, and in kanji form) | Original release date (Note: Date the episode originally aired on TV Tokyo) |
|---|---|---|---|
| 13 | 1 | "Flag.1.0 Flower in Bloom"; Transliteration: "Ikka Ryōran" (Japanese: Flag.1.0 一花繚乱) | April 12, 2011 |
After a brief recap of the first season, Keima Katsuragi theorized to Elsie on why the spirits are attracted to the girls he helped before until they get into an altercation with group of delinquents but Kusunoki Kasuga, the captain of the girls karate club, intervenes. As Kusunoki lectures Keima for his weakness, Elsie detects a spirit inside her. Despite learning from Elsie that most of the members of the girls karate club had quit due to Kusunoki's harsh attitude, Keima asks her to make him her apprentice to learn more about her. She refuses at first but reluctantly agrees due to Keima's bishōnen looks. Keima has no leads on how she really acts, until he sees her cuddling a cat, revealing that she has a soft side. Embarrassed and angry, Kusunoki tries to throw the cat out from the balcony but a manifestation of her appears and saves the cat. Keima realizes that this manifestation shows her soft side whenever she sees cute things. To fully draw out her feminine side by doing the most girly thing, Elsie tells Kusunoki to go on a date with Keima much to their embarrassment as they both reluctantly agree.
| 14 | 2 | "Flag.2.0 Problem Solved by the Fist"; Transliteration: "Ikken Rakuchaku" (Japanese: Flag.2.0 一挙落着) | April 19, 2011 |
Kusunoki is embarrassed on her date with Keima but still continues it hoping it will draw her feminine side out. After failing to connect themselves in their date, Keima and Kusunoki decide to eat an ice cream together, being the most romantic thing to do. After overcoming their embarrassments of doing so, the feminine side finally detaches from her and the two go head to head to fight for dominance. As they battle over inheriting the family dojo or living a life as a woman, Keima intervenes, telling them that they can just choose both and not sacrifice one for the other, in which he alludes to saying that a cat can be considered both cute and strong. Kusunoki admits from her feminine side that she enjoyed her date with Keima despite her earlier denial. The feminine side takes control of Kusunoki's body to kiss Keima as a last act to be remembered, which then releases the spirit inside of her and is captured by Elsie. Kusunoki still continues her martial arts and now accepts her femininity. Later, Elsie tries to explain to Keima the powers of the evil spirits. However, she is inadvertently sucked into a spirit capturing bottle belonging to her friend and fellow spirit hunter named Haqua du Lot Herminium.
| 15 | 3 | "Flag.3.0 The Section Chief Cometh"; Transliteration: "Chikuchō, Kitaru." (Japanese: Flag.3.0 地区長、来たる。) | April 26, 2011 |
Elsie is glad to meet her friend Haqua, a genius who was one of the best students in their class and is now the section chief of her division. Haqua says she has captured 10 spirits, but she initially disbelieves Elsie having captured five of them already. A spirit is reported to be on the loose in the area due to a failure of another spirit hunter. Keima, already aware that Haqua was the spirit hunter who failed to capture the spirit, offers to find the spirit at school in exchange for telling him what the evil spirits are. Haqua explains the spirits are the souls of the demons who were overthrown and sealed by demons who opposed their wicked ways. However, they managed to escape and hide in the hearts of young girls, by which the spirit hunters are tasked to capture them before they are reincarnated as demonic children. Deducing that the spirit feeds on negative emotions, Keima leads Haqua to the school theater, the most depressing place on campus. Keima decides to leave everything to Haqua, but she confesses that she has yet to capture a spirit and lied about it to save face. Elsie confirms to Haqua that the spirit has been found inside the school theater.
| 16 | 4 | "Flag.4.0 The Section Chief Regains Her Pride"; Transliteration: "Chikuchō, Hokori o Torimodosu." (Japanese: Flag.4.0 地区長、誇りを取り戻す。) | May 3, 2011 |
The spirit has gotten powerful from feeding on the negative emotions of the unconscious students around them, which it then escapes to the roof by possessing the students to stop Haqua and Elsie. Haqua is distraught as she has failed to live up to her expectations, which allows the spirit to possess her. By the time Keima and Elsie reach the roof, Haqua is under the control of the spirit, and it uses her and the possessed students to capture them. The only way for Haqua to be freed from its control is to calm the negative emotions in her heart. Haqua is ashamed for having lied to Elsie, inasmuch as to be thought of as a role model. Despite what she did, Elsie embraces her, still looking up to her as the greatest spirit hunter in her eyes. Haqua is finally able to break free from the control of the spirit. Haqua fends off the possessed students, and the spirit is then captured by Elsie. Haqua thanks Keima for his help and for not revealing her ruse to Elsie earlier. Keima congratulates Elsie on a good job, leading her to buy both Keima and Haqua lunch to celebrate.
| 17 | 5 | "Flag.5.0 It Always Raining When We Get There"; Transliteration: "Tadoritsuitara Itsumo Ame Furi" (Japanese: Flag.5.0 たどりついたらいつも雨ふり) | May 10, 2011 |
After learning there are still 60,000 spirits to be captured before his contract is finished, Keima goes into a depression, not helping matters when his classmate the cheerful Chihiro Kosaka makes fun of him. Elsie later detects a spirit nearby, and it just so happens to be inside Chihiro, much to Keima's horror. Keima refuses to assist Elsie this time since Chihiro has no known unique traits that stand out. However, they watch her confessing to a boy, only to see her get rejected. The next day, Keima attempts to console Chihiro, only for her to revert to her old self, revealing that she has been getting turned down by many guys she fancies. Keima scolds Chihiro for playing around with love, but she strikes back with his obsession with bishōjo games, which strikes a deep cord within him. An even more depressed Keima locks himself in his room for days until he decides to come back to school but refusing to speak with anyone. Worried about him, Ayumi Takahara visits Keima, who has fainted from not eating.
| 18 | 6 | "Flag.6.0 10% Chance of Rain"; Transliteration: "10% no Ameyohou" (Japanese: Flag.6.0 10%の雨予報) | May 17, 2011 |
Ayumi, after hearing about their argument, tells Keima to make up with Chihiro. After Ayumi shares lunch with him, Keima learns that all the girls he has helped in the past still have remnants of their feelings for him. Ayumi later tricks both Keima and Chihiro to do cleaning duty together, where Chihiro is truly sorry for insulting him. Keima soon discovers by chance that Chihiro now has a crush on a boy named Yuta. Chihiro asks Keima to teach her some techniques to win over her new crush, since she admits that she does not take love seriously. The following morning, Elsie indirectly points out to Keima that he would not have to be directly involved with Chihiro in filling the emptiness in her heart if he were to help her. Overjoyed by this revelation, he gathers information on Yuta which he then formulates into a plan, where he helps Chihiro get a notable impression from Yuta. As Keima teaches Chihiro in his final plan to get her to confess to Yuta tomorrow, Chihiro start to take an interest with Keima.
| 19 | 7 | "Flag.7.0 Singing in the Rain" | May 24, 2011 |
As Keima prepares Chihiro to finally confess to Yuta, it is then that Chihiro, beginning to have second thoughts, realizes her feelings for Keima and decides to call off the confession. However, Keima is angry that all his effort into this preparation was for naught, but Chihiro leaves with saying that she will never be special like the other girls. Since he never considered her feelings and focused primarily on the confession, Keima decides to make amends in order to capture her heart. By the time he finds Chihiro on a ship, she confesses that she started liking him for also being disappointed with the real world. He then corrects her that he never has given up on himself, despite his dislike with the real world, thereby she should do the same. When Chihiro tries protest that someone as average as her can never be special, Keima kisses her by surprise and tells her as long as she truly wants it, nothing can stop her from becoming special. This forces the spirit out, which is then captured by Elsie. With the spirit gone, Chihiro becomes more cheerful and confident, motivated to start her own rock band. As for Keima, he starts to question his life after remembering the girls he helped before.
| 20 | 8 | "Flag.8.0 Her First Errand"; Transliteration: "Hajimete no☆Otsukai" (Japanese: Flag.8.0 はじめての☆おつかい) | May 31, 2011 |
Keima learns that a rare first edition of a bishōjo game called "Love Tears" will be on sale at another town, so he goes there the next morning with Elsie tagging along. After teaching Elsie the history of bishōjo games and difference between many editions of the same game, Keima tasks Elsie to buy the game while he goes to a game fair. When she finally finds it, she discovers three different editions of "Love Tears" and correctly chooses the expensive one. Unfortunately, Elsie instead buys the anime version of "Love Tears" by mistake, which Keima suspected so he bought the game at the game fair just in case. Later, Haqua arrives at the Katsuragi residence and asks for their assistance for a report of the capture of the spirit that fed on negative emotions at the academy. They use a magical scale model of the school, including autonomous dolls of them and the students that follow their command by a mic. After Keima helps complete her report, Haqua purposely changes the event of when they had arrived at the theater, saying that he clung to her instead of the other way around. Haqua destroys the mic to prevent Keima from changing her version of the incident. She unfortunately reported beforehand that Keima harassed her during that time, which is displayed by their respective dolls. Much to Haqua's embarrassment and Elsie's anger, they attack him in misunderstanding, accidentally letting the dolls loose. After helping recover the dolls, Haqua thanks them for their help, yet Elsie wonders if Haqua used the report as an excuse to visit Keima.
| 21 | 9 | "Flag.9.0 Class 2-B Miss Nagase"; Transliteration: "2-Nen B-gumi Nagase-sensei" (Japanese: Flag.9.0 2年B組長瀬先生) | June 7, 2011 |
Jun Nagase, idealistic and upbeat, is assigned as a new student teacher for the class taught by Yuri Nikaidō. Jun, at first bewildered that everyone is indifferent to Keima playing video games during class, believes that he is a problem child, after all the other teachers explain their issues with him. She leaves with fear after trying to talk to him about it, but a spirit later enters her body when she had the resolve to help him open up. When Keima and Elsie learn about this, Keima finds his next target difficult since he is aware that a teacher cannot easily fall in love with a student unless they eventually see each other as equals. As Keima leaves the campus to figure out his plan, Jun catches sight of him, thinking he is ditching school. After dragging him to have lunch with her, she offers him to talk to her about his assumed problems. However, Keima does not like this unprecedented event since it will take too long for him to capture her heart.
| 22 | 10 | "Flag.10.0 School☆Wars"; Transliteration: "Sukūru☆Uōzu" (Japanese: スクール☆ウォーズ) | June 14, 2011 |
Keima has an idea to quickly grow his relationship with Jun by forcing her to hate him and then turning those feelings into love, though this plan backfires as it only causes her to be more concerned about him. After finally getting him alone in class, Jun tell Keima her belief of him using video games as a form of escape from reality, but he scolds her for judging him by her own standards. With no other choice and a change of plans, Keima asks Nikaidō for more information about Jun, which she agrees to in exchange for helping her in her schoolwork. Meanwhile, Jun still affected by what Keima told her earlier, decides to help his class in their schoolwork after Ichiro Kodama insults them as failures. But when the students tell her that they do not have the zeal to improve themselves, a frustrated Jun inadvertently berates them before storming out the classroom. Keima later finds out that Jun and Nikaidō were both on the girls basketball team before it disbanded over an incident in the past.
| 23 | 11 | "Flag.11.0 There's Always a Sun in Your Heart"; Transliteration: "Itsumo Kokoro ni Taiyō o" (Japanese: いつも心に太陽を) | June 21, 2011 |
Jun, going to a professional wrestling match, finds Keima sitting in her seat, thanks to Elsie discreetly duplicating her ticket, and is forced to sit with him during the match. After she wonders why her students had refused her help, Keima asks Jun why the girls basketball team was disbanded when she was captain. He then concludes that it was her selfish idealism that forced the other members to quit, despite her claiming her focus on perfecting their teamwork. She leaves the stadium in anger after hearing his words. The next day, Jun enters the class in a marathon race in hopes to help them bond, but, as the students feel pressured by this, Jun runs away after calling them all selfish. Keima then unexpectedly calls out their behavior before suddenly disappearing from the classroom. As Jun arrives at the old girls basketball team locker room, Keima confronts her for still remaining the same way since her team disbanded. Going into the school gymnasium, Keima consoles and convinces her never to give up and to try as hard as she can to make her students accept her ideals. Jun cheers up when the whole class comes to find her to apologize, much to her joy. Jun is unaware that Keima predetermined the events, purposely having the students start to dislike him then having them worry about her. As her internship comes to a finish, Keima asks Jun to return to the school someday, in which Jun promises to become a much better teacher by then. She then kisses him, finally expelling the spirit inside of her.
| 24 | 12 | "Flag.12.0 Summer Wars"; Transliteration: "Samā Uōzu" (Japanese: サマーウォーズ) | June 28, 2011 |
Though with its poor character design, Keima plays a bishōjo game called "One Leaf", yet quickly falls in love with heroine Yotsuba Sugimoto, believing she is his ideal game heroine. Keima enjoys the game so much, that he decides to play it at a slow pace, ignoring everyone throughout the whole day, much to Elsie's chagrin and Haqua's confusion. Later that night, Keima receives an email from its game studio, who asks Keima to help them create a bishōjo game under his direction. As Keima thinks of ideas for the game, his inner minds soon start arguing over what is ideal and perfect. However, this war finally stops when all of them remember the importance of a bishōjo game. With that in mind, Keima contacts the game studio to tell them to make a good game. As the season finale comes to an end, including a preview of the new cast of heroines for Keima in the next season, Keima ends the episode saying that although he does not accept reality, he can still discover a way to be a part of it.
