= The World God Only Knows: Goddesses =

- No. of episodes: 12

Release
- Original network: TV Tokyo, TVO, TSC, TVQ, TVh, TV Aichi
- Original release: July 8 – September 23, 2013

Season chronology
- ← Previous; Season 2

The third season of The World God Only Knows, titled The World God Only Knows: Goddesses (神のみぞ知るセカイ 女神篇), is an anime series based on the manga series of the same name by Tamiki Wakaki. It was produced by Manglobe and directed by Satoshi Ōsedo. The series follows the exploits of Keima Katsuragi, an intelligent, gloomy teenager who is known on the Internet as "The God of Conquest" for his legendary skills to "conquer" any girl in Bishōjo games, yet does not like girls in real life, where he is known as the Otamegane (オタメガネ), a derogatory portmanteau of the two words otaku (オタク) and Megane (メガネ, lit. glasses). One day, out of pride, he accidentally accepts what he assumes to be a challenge for a Bishōjo game when in reality he has accepted a contract from a bumbling demoness named Elsie who asks for his help in capturing runaway spirits from Hell who are hiding in the hearts of girls. The only way to force the spirits out of the girls hearts is by replacing the spirits in the girls' hearts with himself (metaphorically speaking) by making the girls fall in love with him, much to Keima's horror. With the threat of death for both of them should he refuse, Keima has no choice but to help Elsie. Together with his intelligence and knowledge of the dating sim genre and Elsie's magical powers, Keima is about to embark on his greatest challenge. It aired from July 8, 2013, to September 23, 2013.

Five pieces of theme music are used for third season. The opening theme, titled "God only knows -Secrets of the Goddess- (Extract)", and is performed by Saori Hayami under the name "Oratorio The World God Only Knows" and the ending theme song is "Kizuna no Yukue" (キズナノユクエ, "The Way of the Bonds") by "The Jupiter Sisters" (ユピテルの姉妹, Jupiter no Shimai) which is composed of the third season's voice actresses, Kaori Nazuka, Nao Toyama, Yuka Iguchi, Ayahi Takagaki, Kana Hanazawa and Ayana Taketatsu, who each sing a solo version of the ending theme song in different episodes. Additionally, three special ending theme songs were used. The first song, "Hitomi Kara Snow" (瞳からスノー, lit. "A Pupil from the Snow") by Nao Tōyama was used for the 32nd episode, the second song, "With...You..." by Saori Hayami was used in the 34th episode and the third song use for the 36th episode was "Hajimete Koi wo Shita Kioku" (初めて恋をした記憶, lit. "The Memory of My First Love") by Kana Asumi and Nao Tōyama under the name the 2B PENCILS and Kanon Nagakawa.

== Episodes ==
No. overall	No. in season	Title (Note: Title of the episode: literally translated, romanized using Hepburn romanization, and in kanji form)	Original release date (Note: Date the episode originally aired on TV Tokyo)
25	1	"Flag. 1.0 When the Sun Goes Down"	July 8, 2013
Keima explains to the audience how he has captured five girls and three unique girls after the last season. Meanwhile, Kanon is preparing for her school tests, but ends up talking with her split personality, Apollo, who claims to be a goddess. The next day, Keima and Elsie meet up with Tenri and within her, Diana. Diana wants Keima to marry Tenri as Tenri's love for Keima increases her powers, which he refuses. When asked to explain what she is, Diana reveals she is a goddess, one of the Jupiter Sisters, who helped the New Demons of Hell against the Weiss, when they attempted to take over the three realms of Earth, Heaven and Hell, and control all souls. After defeating them, the Jupiter Sisters sacrificed themselves by sealing themselves together with the Weiss, but they escaped ten years ago. Diana asks Keima to help find her sisters and reveals they reside in his past conquests, who did not forget their memories with him. At the same time, Kanon is stalked by a hooded stranger much to her worry. When Kanon spots her stalker during her test, she runs into Keima's arms. Kanon reveals to him she still remembers her time with him and declares she loves him much to their class' shock. Realizing Kanon has a goddess inside of her, he drags her away from everyone, only for Apollo to take over Kanon and run away, believing Keima is an innocent bystander. However, as she attempts to find a place to hide, Apollo is attacked and stabbed by her stalker who reveals herself to be Lune of Vintage.
26	2	"Flag. 2.0 Scrambled Formation"; Transliteration: "Sukuranburu Fōmēshon" (Japanese: スクランブルフォーメーション)	July 15, 2013
Apollo casts a warning in the sky to her sisters to trust no one before succumbing to her wounds. Lune attempts to finish her but is stopped by Nikaidō. Keima, Diana, Elsie and Haqua have Apollo taken to the Katsuragi household where they discover the magic dagger used on Apollo and Kanon is ancient Weiss magic and the culprits are Vintage, a group of demons who wish to resurrect the Weiss. With Kanon having a week to live, Keima must find the other four goddesses to heal her before Vintage gets them. To accomplish this without incident, Elsie disguises herself as Kanon and Keima tricks his mother to go to South America. Partnering with Haqua who is disguised as Elsie, Keima uses the rumor of Kanon's confession to see the reactions of his prior conquests, who will act jealous if they remember falling in love with him. Keima narrows his suspects to Ayumi, Chihiro, Shiori and Tsukiyo Kujyo, who were all embarrassed around him. When he at first thinks Yui Goido is not a goddess host due to not remembering him, a confused Keima is surprised when Yui confesses her love for him, which Shiori and Haqua mistake the cross-dressing Yui as a boy who is being intimate with Keima. With his five suspects, Keima must now make them fall in love with him again which will fuel the goddesses' powers and determine if they're a host.
27	3	"Flag. 3.0 5 Home"	July 22, 2013
Keima plans to spend an hour each with the girls to raise their affection for him without any of them encountering each other with Haqua's help. He manages to succeed with Tsukiyo on the bus but compilations occur when the 2B-Pencils finish band practice early which leaves Haqua with Chihiro. As a result, he misses Yui but continues by walking home with Ayumi and Miyako. Unfortunately, Haqua and Chihiro are heading in the same direction which prompts him to take Ayumi and Miyako inside the mall. After making sure Chihiro is busy with Haqua, he has a private talk with Ayumi that he won't give up on her. Next, he meets up with Chihiro at the music store where he praises a song she wrote. Later, he heads towards the library to meet with Shiori where he finds a story written about them that resembles her conquest with the roles reversed but his character is killed due to the rumors with Kanon. Shiori spots him reading her story but Keima uses this to make additions to her story which serves as a medium to convey their feelings to each other. Outside, Keima spots Yui who has been following him and much to his discomfort, Yui is hitting on him despite knowing Keima's a playboy and wants him to crossdress as a girl. The next day, Nora arrives with orders from their higher ups that the spirit hunters are to find goddesses from Heaven. Suspicious, Keima has Haqua get more information from Nora while he continues his conquests.
28	4	"Flag. 4.0 Doll Roll Hall"	July 29, 2013
Keima arrives at the library whereupon Shiori allows him to read her story while being watched. Meanwhile, Nora discovers Kanon and demands an explanation from Haqua. In the library Keima discovers that Luna, Tsukiyo's doll, is Vulcanus who warns Keima never to approach Tsukiyo again. Attempting to stop Vulcanus from being discovered, he approaches Tsukiyo not realizing she is in fact truly Vulcanus controlling objects. With both Vulcanus and Tsukiyo mad at Keima for cheating on her, he makes Tsukiyo remember the promise he made to her. Succumbing to her pity for his injury, Tsukiyo kisses Keima whereupon she grows wings. Nora explains to Haqua that Vintage have infiltrated the spirit hunters and the search order for the goddesses is a plot to capture them. Reunited, Diana and Vulcanus combine their powers to remove the cursed dagger but Apollo turns Kanon's body into a liquid state as a preservation measure. After making a deal with Nora to help them, Haqua expresses her feelings for Keima only to be interrupted by Diana. Diana is angry that Vulcanus manage to regain her wings while she hasn't despite Tenri having loved Keima longer. After Keima calms her, Diana realizes her hatred for Keima is preventing the restoration of her powers and tries to accept him. As Tenri heads home, Diana's wings appear.
29	5	"Flag. 5.0 Punch and Date"; Transliteration: "Panchi de Dēto" (Japanese: ぱんちDEでーと)	August 5, 2013
Keima sends Tsukiyo home warning Vulcanus not to reveal herself while he searches for the other goddesses. Unexpectedly, Yui has come to Keima's home to ask him out. Keima explains to Haqua he must now conquer Yui before Vintage realizes she has a goddess. The next day, Keima crossdress as a girl which gains Yui interest to awaken her past memories while unknowingly being overseen by Shiori. After Keima asks her out for a date, the goddess Mars finally awakens inside of Yui. As the crossdressing couple spend time together on their date at an amusement park, Keima is kidnapped by a Vintage agent. Wishing to save Keima, Yui's love for him finally restores Mars' powers which she defeats the agent who is revealed to be Haqua which was a part of Keima's plan to awaken her powers. Yui proclaims her love for Keima and kisses him, which restore Mars' wings. After explaining everything to Yui and Mars and warning them to be careful, Keima and Haqua head home only to encounter one of Elsie's live ingredients. As Keima, Elsie and Haqua have dinner, Nikaidō watches over them.
30	6	"Flag. 6.0 About me" Transliteration: "Watashi ni Tsuite." (Japanese: 私について。)	August 12, 2013
Shiori is having trouble finishing her novel for the Mai High Festival due to her conflicting feelings for Keima. She then notices a young girl, who is actually her goddess, and chases after only to meet up with a crossdressing Keima. As she inquires his crossdressing and eat at a Ramen shop, Shiori tells Keima that she wants to make a story of him. Keima explains to Haqua that with Shiori's boosted confidence after their talk, she can now finish writing her novel. But the next day, Shiori is suffering writer's block so Keima decides to stay with her at the library to help her. After several drafts and procrastination by reading books, Keima eventually tells Shiori to write about herself especially when they both lock themselves in the library. Realizing Keima was there and kissed her during that time, Shiori starts writing. The next morning, Keima reads her story about her life at the library which ends with her declaring she loves Keima. The goddess Minerva involuntarily reveals herself to Keima and immediately reverts to Shiori as Keima rewards her hard work with a kiss on the cheek, causing her to grow wings. After Keima leaves, Minerva introduces herself to her host and Shiori contemplates that she has found her voice and is eager to finish her novel.
31	7	"Flag. 7.0 Bad Medicine"	August 19, 2013
Keima gets sick from a cold so Nora's partner Ryo is ordered to watch over him. With two targets left, Keima decides to use his cold to get Ayumi to visit him by calling her while he calls Chihiro not to come so both of them won't visit at the same time. At his home, Ayumi decides to stay to take care of Keima after seeing him sick. Just when things were going according to his plan, Chihiro unexpectedly visits no thanks to Ryo letting her in. With no choice, Keima hides Ayumi under his bed as Chihiro takes care of him while trying to simultaneously raise both girls affection. After Chihiro leaves the bedroom after singing her song for him, Keima tries to explain to an angry Ayumi nothing is going on between him and Chihiro. But Chihiro knocks on the door and confesses to Keima which he feigns ignorance before she leaves. Keima tries to call Chihiro but Ayumi contacts her first where she admits she heard Chihiro's confession and supports her. Keima's is bewildered when Ayumi is no longer angry and leaves but not before telling him to be nice to Chihiro.
32	8	"Flag. 8.0 Goddess Mix"; Transliteration: "Megami Mikkusu" (Japanese: めがみみっくす)	August 26, 2013
While attending a meeting between the section chiefs in New Hell, Haqua questions Dokuro Skull if Vintage have infiltrated the spirit hunters which the latter denies. However, Haqua is arrested by Public Safety which she later learns to her shock from Nora that Vintage have also infiltrated the highers ups and Dokuro Skull was the one who ordered her arrest. Back at Earth, Keima gathers all the awakened goddesses at his house in order to undo the spell cast on Kanon and awaken Apollo. During the ritual, Keima is brought to Apollo's realm. There, Apollo reveals she cannot leave now as she stopping the power of the Weiss from spreading the city but can only do so for three more days. Kanon and Apollo put their faith on him and grow their wings before he returns home. While Majima High prepares for their upcoming festival, Ayumi becomes a participant of a pageant as Chihiro invites Keima on a date. On their date, Keima plans to kiss Chihiro as he suspects she has a goddess to awaken her powers. As Keima looks for a perfect spot to be alone, Chihiro agrees with Keima to look for one where there aren't any people around. Back in New Hell, Lune searches for more information about Haqua.
33	9	"Flag. 9.0 Absent Lovers"	September 2, 2013
Chihiro and Keima head to the rooftop to continue their date. As they are about to kiss, Chihiro asks him to be gentle as this is her first time, which leads Keima to realize that Chihiro doesn't have a goddess as she does not remember her first kiss with him. Also, she confesses that she was in love with him long before her conquest. Chihiro asks him if he loves her and kisses him but Keima, knowing he must now conquer Ayumi, lies to her saying he doesn't and only dated her as revenge for making fun of him. A heartbroken Chihiro runs away where-after an angry Ayumi, who witnessed what Keima did, kicks him and leaves, later crying while her goddess scolds her for falling in love with him. At home, Keima gets depressed about what he did to Chihiro but is later cheered up by Tenri. The next day, the Mai High Festival begins and Keima learns from Elsie that the festival existed long before the Academy's founding after which Keima notices the Academy's emblem is a goddess. Seeing a connection, Keima heads to the theater where he discovers the entry and exit of the tunnel has been sealed. Keima and Elsie then head to the sea to Point Rock, while being watched by Akari Kurakawa, one of his past conquest and Nikaidō, his homeroom teacher. There, Keima and Elsie discover that inside Point Rock is a lair where Vintage are raising Weiss in eggs to be reborn. Despite what he uncovered, Keima decides not to intervene as it is not his battle and chooses to continue his conquest of Ayumi.
34	10	"Flag. 10.0 Labyrinth"; Transliteration: "Rabirinsu" (Japanese: ラビリンス)	September 9, 2013
Ayumi is still angry with Keima but is forced to work with him after he becomes the 2-B Class Cafe barista. Keima tries to talk with Ayumi but her anger and Chihiro being there doesn't help. Meanwhile, Lune orders Vintage to target all of Keima's past conquests. At the forest, Keima tries to stop Ayumi from revealing to Chihiro that she's also in love with Keima but the three of them are captured by agents of Vintage until Haqua saves them. It is revealed Dokuro Skull had to arrest Haqua or Vintage would have killed her so now she frees her and tells Haqua to help Keima and stop Vintage's plans. After defeating the Vintage agents, Haqua and Keima lie to Ayumi and Chihiro what happen earlier was part of Special Effect Film Society. As Haqua reveals to Keima that all of his past conquests where captured by Vintage after they correctly suspect the Goddesses were hiding in them, Ayumi heads home as Nora offers her assistance to watch her. As Chihiro is dragged to his home, Keima, Diana and Haqua realize Vintage plan is to release the Weiss on Earth by killing the goddesses at Point Rock which will open a gate from New Hell. Knowing he must awaken Mercurius inside of Ayumi so the goddesses combine powers can stop Vintage, Keima heads to Ayumi's home with Haqua and Chihiro, who overheard his plans.
35	11	"Flag. 11.0 SHOW ME"	September 16, 2013
As Ayumi contemplates on what Keima said to her, Keima ask her to meet him at Kozue River. Haqua explains to Chihiro why Keima has to make Ayumi fall in love with him as he tries to make her like him again. However, their date is constantly interrupted by Vintage which Chihiro suggests she, Keima and Ayumi stay at Miyako's home. However, Chihiro seemingly reveals Keima's plans to Ayumi, causing Ayumi to slap him and storm off. Akari and Nikaidō assess their failed efforts to protect the Goddesses and decide to put their trust on Keima. Meanwhile, Chihiro reveals she told Ayumi the truth so that Keima would love Ayumi genuinely and Ayumi would no longer worry about her. To see if Keima is honestly in love with her, Ayumi asks that he marry her which Keima agrees, even in front of her parents. Given a wedding dress while being proposed to, Ayumi declines all of Keima's confessions as unsatisfactory and runs off telling him she'll be waiting for him at the harbor. As Nora watches over Ayumi and Ryō places decoys around town to fool Vintage, Keima and Chihiro head to Ayumi's location as Haqua defends them against Lune.
36	12	"Flag. 12.0 The Memory of My First Love"; Transliteration: "Hajimete Koi o Shita Kioku" (Japanese: 初めて恋をした記憶)	September 23, 2013
As they head to Ayumi's location, Chihiro tells Keima he should tell the truth to Ayumi as unknown to Keima, she already told Ayumi that he was trying to win her heart for something important. At the harbor, Keima tell Ayumi he will honestly tell the truth if she ask anything before continuing their wedding. When she ask if he really loves her, Keima answers he doesn't. After some bickering between the two, Ayumi tells Keima no one should manipulate her feelings as she does love him before kissing him, finally awakening Mercurius' powers. Just when it seems Vintage will capture them, Diana flies and rescues Mercurius and loyalist spirit hunters led by Akari battle Vintage at Point Rock which Akari tells Keima his work is done and he may leave. As the Goddesses and spirit hunters rescue Keima's former conquests, fight Vintage and destroy Point Rock, Keima and Chihiro heads to his home to get her guitar. Chihiro ask Keima if there was something special in her that he tried to conquer her which he lies there wasn't which she also lies she's ok before they say goodbye. On the night of the concert, the 2B Pencils and Kanon sing Chihiro's song as Keima watches. As the credits roll, Keima's past conquest enjoy the festival while the Goddesses spread their wings which only Chihiro sees. Keima heads to the roof tops and cries, apologizing to Chihiro for hurting her while Chihiro struggles to hold her tears to finish her song after remembering her love for Keima. In the epilogue, Mari returns from her trip to South America, all of Vintage were captured and their plans to resurrect the Weiss have been foiled, Haqua is reinstated as spirit hunter while Nora is promoted to Head Section Chief thanks to Keima's deal for her to take credit in finding the Goddesses. As for Keima, everything became normal again but his feelings changed while playing his games because of what happened to Chihiro.
