= Maggie Flecknoe =

American voice actress (born 1983)

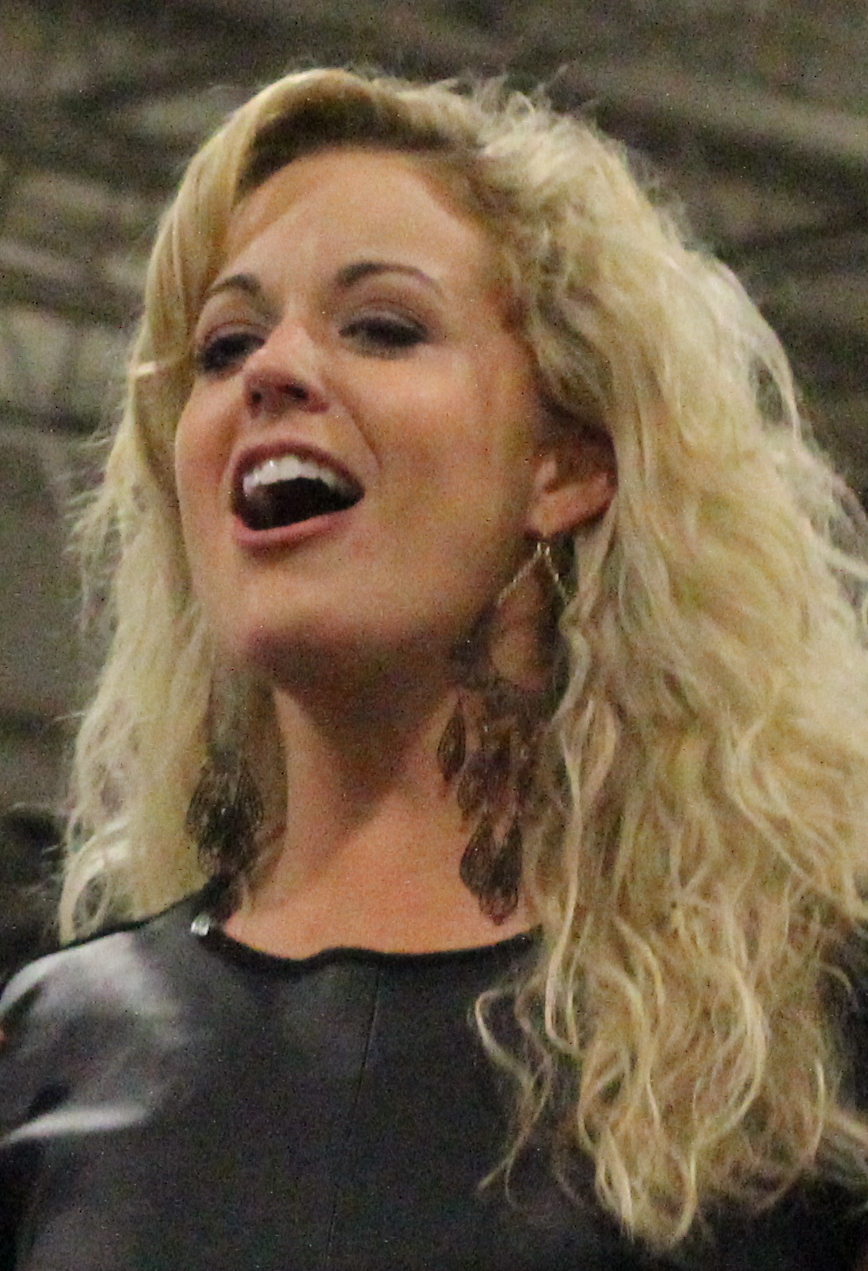
- Flecknoe at Animate Miami in 2013
- Born: Marguerite Kathryn Flecknoe; April 17, 1983 (age 43); Aurora, Colorado, U.S.
- Education: University of Colorado, Boulder (BA); Harvard University (MFA)
- Occupations: Voice actress; radio personality; television host; producer
- Years active: 2009–present
- Employer: Nexstar Media Group
- Notable work: Shinka Nibutani in Love, Chunibyo & Other Delusions!; Saya Takagi in High School of the Dead; Kana Kojima in Why the Hell are You Here, Teacher!?; Meroune Lorelei in Monster Musume; Bai Mongfa in Love Flops; Marielle in Log Horizon
- Spouse: Jeff
- Children: 1
- Website: maggieflecknoe.com

Marguerite Kathryn Flecknoe (born April 17, 1983) is an American voice actress, radio personality, television host and producer.

Flecknoe was born in Aurora, Colorado, and began pursuing a career of voice over work in 2009. Since that time, she provided characters of several anime series distributed by Houston-based Sentai Filmworks and Dallas-based Funimation such as Shinka Nibutani in Love, Chunibyo & Other Delusions!, Saya Takagi in High School of the Dead, Kana Kojima in Why the Hell are You Here, Teacher!?, Meroune Lorelei in Monster Musume, Marielle in Log Horizon, and Bai Mongfa in Love Flops.

Outside of voice acting, Flecknoe serves as the host of Houston Happens morning show on Houston The CW affiliate KIAH-TV.

== Biography ==
Flecknoe was born on April 17, 1983, in Aurora, Colorado. She graduated with honors and a Bachelor of Science degree in Journalism and Broadcast News, and a minor in Theatre from the University of Colorado at Boulder in May 2005. That summer she started graduate studies at Harvard University and the Moscow Art Theatre School where she earned a master's degree in theater.

== Career ==
Flecknoe has done a variety of work from appearing in a commercial with Yao Ming, to doing voiceover work for Japanese anime. In 2009, she played the role of Mrs. Elizabeth Corban in a local production of Catch Me If You Can. Flecknoe is also known for providing the voice for several characters for ADV Films and Sentai Filmworks/Seraphim Digital. She has also worked as an entertainment, news, and traffic reporter for Newsradio 740 KTRH and 790 ESPN Radio, the Sports Animal. Currently, she produces and hosts a regular online segment on KIAH-TV (CW affiliate in Houston) called the Online Dish and has also helped with their morning news program No Wait Weather + Traffic.

== Filmography ==
=== Anime roles ===
- 7 Seeds - Kurumi Shikano
- Akame ga Kill! – Kijie (Bols' Wife, Ep. 13), Mez (Ep. 18)
- After the Rain – Yui Nishida
- Amnesia – Heroine
- Another – Tomoka Inose (Ep. 7), Additional Voices
- Babylon – Ai Magase
- BanG Dream! 2nd Season – Arisa Ichigaya
- Battle Girls: Time Paradox – Yoshimoto Imagawa
- Best Student Council – Mami Aoki
- Bodacious Space Pirates – Belinda Percy
- Broken Blade – Lee
- Btooom! – Shiki Murasaki
- Campione! – Lucrezia Zora
- Chained Soldier – Shikoku
- Clannad – Yukine Miyazawa
- Comic Party Revolution – Sawada
- Demon King Daimao – Korone
- Devil May Cry: The Animated Series – Cindy
- Dream Eater Merry – Ichima, Nao Horie
- Diabolik Lovers – Yui Komori
- Farming Life in Another World – Roaju
- Fate/kaleid liner Prisma Illya – Irisviel von Einzbern
- The Garden of Words – Yukari Yukino
- Ghost Hound – Aya Komagusu,
- Girls und Panzer – Piyotan, Yuuki Utsugi
- Haikyuu!! – Yui Michimiya
- Heaven's Memo Pad – Miku Kimura
- Highschool of the Dead – Saya Takagi
- Horizon in the Middle of Nowhere – Kimi Aoi, Naomasa (Season 2)
- ICE – Aoi
- Kakegurui – Yumemi Yumemite (Sentai Filmworks dub)
- Kamisama Dolls – Kuko Kawahari
- Kanon – Shiori Misaka
- Kiba – Aisha
- Kids on the Slope – Yurika Fukahori
- La storia della Arcana Famiglia – Meriella
- Land of the Lustrous – Aculeatus
- Legends of the Dark King – Isabella
- Level 1 Demon Lord and One Room Hero – Mizuhara/Yosuke's Mother
- Log Horizon – Marielle
- Love, Chunibyo & Other Delusions – Shinka Nibutani
- Love Flops – Mongfa
- MM! – Yumi Mamiya
- Majestic Prince – Teoria
- Majikoi! – Oh! Samurai Girls – Ami Itagaki, Tsubame Matsunaga
- Medaka Box – Mogana Kikajima
- My Youth Romantic Comedy Is Wrong, As I Expected - Mori-chan
- Momo: The Girl God of Death – Eko Miyazaki (Ep. 5)
- Nakaimo - My Sister is Among Them! – Rinka Kunitachi
- Needless – Aruka Schild, Seto
- Night Raid 1931 – Lili (Ep. 3), Shunyo Akitsuki (Ep. 0), Additional Voices
- Nyan Koi! – Kanako Sumiyoshi
- Pani Poni Dash! – Ichijo
- Parasyte – Kana Kimishima
- Penguindrum – Masako Natsume
- Peter Grill and the Philosopher's Time - Lucy
- Phi Brain: Puzzle of God – Miharu Sakanoue
- Project Blue Earth SOS – Maggie
- Red Garden – Rachel Benning
- Revue Starlight – Mahiru Tsuyuzaki
- Rifle Is Beautiful – Misa Kuroi
- Samurai Girls – Hanzo Hattori (credited as Ophelia Cox) (Note: The voice actor closing credits for Samurai Girls have joke pseudonyms such as Eileen Dover, Ophelia Cox, and Hasaan Chop.)
- The Seven Heavenly Virtues - Gabriel
- Shattered Angels – Setsuna
- Shining Hearts: Shiawase no Pan – Amil
- To Love Ru – Saki Tenjōin
- Tokyo Majin – Hinano Oribe, Sera Rikudo
- Tsuritama – Misaki Shimano
- Tokyo Magnitude 8.0 – Masami Onozawa, Megu
- Un-Go – Kumi Yasuda (Ep. 0)
- Upotte!! – Sako
- Venus Versus Virus – Risa
- Wasteful Days of High School Girls – Minami "Yamai" Yamamoto
- Waiting in the Summer – Mio Kitahara
- Why the Hell are You Here, Teacher!? – Kana Kojima
- When Supernatural Battles Became Commonplace – Sayumi Takanashi
- The World God Only Knows – Kusunoki Kasuga, Miss Nikido (Seasons 2-3, OVAs), Nora
- Xam'd Lost Memories – Prois Sukakki

== Awards and nominations ==
Year	Award	Category	Role	Result
2013	2nd Annual Behind the Voice Actors (BTVA) Anime Dub Awards	Best Female Lead Vocal Performance in an Anime Movie/Special	Yukari Yukino (The Garden of Words)	Won
