= Krystal LaPorte =

American voice actress

- Education: University of Illinois Urbana-Champaign; University of Houston Law Center
- Occupations: Voice actress; attorney
- Years active: 2013–present
- Partner: Christopher Ayres
- Website: www.krystallaporte.com

Krystal LaPorte is an American voice actress and lawyer, best known for her work on English dubs of Japanese anime series.

== Early life and career ==
LaPorte was raised in a suburb of Chicago, where from a young age she was active in local theater; and became interested in poetry and music. She intended to take a theater program with the aim of a career as an opera singer, instead taking the path to become an attorney. She graduated with a Bachelor of Science in Philosophy, Political Science and Psychology from the University of Illinois Urbana-Champaign, and went on to study at the University of Houston Law Center. During her three years in law school, she pursued a voice acting career, after studying acting theory and improv in her free time during her Bachelor's program. Since passing the bar, LaPorte primarily works as a criminal defense attorney, with voice acting sessions occupying her evenings.

== Personal life ==
LaPorte initially met Christopher Ayres through voice acting in anime, but credited their bond to a variety of common interests. LaPorte and Ayres were in a relationship for nine years, until his death in 2021.

== Filmography ==
=== Anime series ===
List of voice performances in anime series
Year	Title	Role	Notes	Ref.
2014	Tamako Market	Shiori Asagiri		
2014	Log Horizon	Misa, Ivan	Seasons 1 and 3	
2014	Diabolik Lovers	Shu Sakamaki (young)		
2014	The Ambition of Oda Nobuna	Akechi Mitsuhide		
2015	Muv-Luv Alternative: Total Eclipse	Yui	Main role	
2015	The World God Only Knows: Goddesses	Yui Goido/Mars		
2015	Nobunaga the Fool	Himiko		
2015	Parasyte	Misaki's Mom		
2015	Beyond the Boundary	Mirai Kuriyama	Main role	
2015	Black Bullet	Kohina Hiruko		
2015	Chaika: The Coffin Princess	Dominca Skoda, Frederica, Cat		
2016	Wizard Barristers	Tsunomi Kabutohara		
2017	Brave Witches	Flight Sergeant Nikka Edvardine "Nipa" Katajainen	Main role	
2018	Overlord	Tina	Season 2	
2019	Dragon Ball Super	Rylibeu		
2019	Kemono Friends	Lion		
2021	Suppose a Kid from the Last Dungeon Boonies Moved to a Starter Town	Marie	Main role	
2021	Full Dive	Martin (young)		
2022	She Professed Herself Pupil of the Wiseman	Lyrica		
2022	Gekidol	Yasuko		
2022	Girls' Frontline	Kawasaki		
2022	Skeleton Knight in Another World	Lauren		
2022	Gunbuster	Reiko		
2022	Smile of the Arsnotoria	Perdura		
2023	PuraOre! Pride of Orange	Atsumi Kawakami		
2023	Handyman Saitō in Another World	Lafanpan		
2023	Reign of the Seven Spellblades	Esmeralda		
2024	Tales of Wedding Rings	Peridot (The Elder)	Supporting Character	
2024	Tales of Wedding Rings	The Oracle	Minor Character	
2025	The Red Ranger Becomes an Adventurer in Another World	Emily Tobihoshi/Kizuna Yellow		
2025	Shangri-La Frontier	Akane		
2025	Tales of Wedding Rings	Peridot (The Elder)	Supporting Character	
2025	May I Ask for One Final Thing?	Rosa		
2026	Roll Over and Die	Cyrill		

=== Film ===
List of voice performances in film
Year	Title	Role	Notes	Ref.
1995	Memories (1995 film)	Miki	Supporting Character	
2015	Aura: Koga Maryuin's Last War	Hino		
2016	Strike Witches: The Movie	Nikka Edvardine Katajainen		
2019	Chuck Shimezou	Chie	Main Character	
2020	Goblin Slayer: Goblin's Crown	Female Warrior		

=== Animation ===
Year	Title	Role	Notes	Ref.
2019	Hazbin Hotel	Cherri Bomb	Pilot only	

=== Live Action ===
Year	Title	Role	Notes	Ref.
2023	Ultraman Z	Ruri Inaba	English Dub	
