= List of The World God Only Knows characters =

The heroines from The World God Only Knows series.

The World God Only Knows manga and anime series features an extensive cast of characters created by Tamiki Wakaki.

The main protagonist is Keima Katsuragi, a video game player who teams up with Elsie, a Spirit Hunter Demon, to capture spirits hiding in girls at his high school, Maijima High. Fourteen of the characters were named after stations in the Kintetsu train system. In September 2014, Kintetsu had a promotion where they issued special tickets bearing the characters' images.

== Main characters ==
=== Keima Katsuragi ===
Voiced by: Hiro Shimono (Japanese); Chris Patton (English)

Keima Katsuragi (桂木 桂馬, Katsuragi Keima), a 17-year-old high school student at Maijima Academy, is known on the Internet and in gaming circles as The Capturing God (落とし神, Otoshi-gami) because of his exceptional skills and experience in "capturing" (winning over) virtual girls in dating sims and gal games (galge) (ギャルゲーム, gyaru gēmu) However, in real life, he is called otamegane (オタメガネ) (a portmanteau of otaku (オタク) and megane (メガネ, glasses)), where he immerses himself in the game world and declares that he is only attracted to the virtual games within it. Whenever he faces danger, he prioritizes saving his game.^{[ch. 1]} At the start of the series, he accepts a request to help conquer girls, and inadvertently finds himself contractually bound to capture Loose Souls (駆け魂, Kaketama; spirits),^{[ch. 1]} which reside in the hearts of real girls, or he will be beheaded.^{[ch. 1]} The bulk of the series follows his adventures in capturing such girls, where he tries different scenarios from his girl games. After Keima has captured over a dozen girls, he is asked by Diana to find her sisters among the girls, with the incentive that they can re-seal the Loose Souls and fulfill his otherwise impossible contract.^{[ch. 80,81]} His search is accelerated when his classmate Kanon Nakagawa is injured by a Vintage assassin.^{[ch. 118,119]} He eventually fall in love with Chihiro, although he coldly rejects her. He tearfully apologizes later about rejecting her though not to her face. In the last chapter, he finally reveals his true feelings to her.

Wakaki depicts Keima as good at all sorts of games, some of which is due to the fact that many of them are mini-game subsets of his girl games.^{[ch. 20,47,77,104]}. Although he rarely pays attention in class, and has low physical endurance, he scores top marks, much to his teachers' frustrations.^{[ch. 11,12]} Wakaki notes that Keima's name is derived from the term "gamer".

=== Elsie ===
Voiced by: Kanae Itō (Japanese); Luci Christian (English)

Elcea de Rux Ima (エリュシア・デ・ルート・イーマ, Eryushia de Lūte Īma; also Elysia de Lute Ima), known mainly as Elsie (エルシィ, Erushii), is a Spirit Hunter demon (Note: Elsie is considered a demon in the Sentai Filmworks English dub. In some of the manga translations, Elsie and the folks from New Hell are referred to as devils instead of demons.) assigned to Keima to capture loose souls.^{[ch. 1]} In order to watch over him, she pretends to be Keima's illegitimate sister.^{[ch. 2,6]} She wears a skull-shaped hair ornament that alerts her to the presence of loose souls.^{[ch. 1]} She wears a hagoromo (羽衣), a multi-purpose shawl-like raiment that she can use to change her appearance,^{[ch. 1]} turn herself and others invisible,^{[ch. 19]} or reshape objects.^{[ch. 3,44]} She travels with a broom, and prides herself on her cleaning abilities, which she learned prior to joining the squad.^{[ch. 2]} Like Keima, she wears a collar and is also bound to Dokuro Skull's contract conditions.^{[ch. 1]}

Despite being over 300 years old, she has a sweet, pure and innocent personality and often acts childishly. She is clumsy and easily distracted, especially by fire trucks, so Keima considers her unreliable.^{[ch. 1,23,24]} However, her friendliness and cheerful nature allows her to make friends with the girls.^{[ch. 42,54]} In the final story arc, she reveals that she is the "final boss", a powerful monster that was periodically awakened in the past to spread mayhem. New Hell's rebel faction wanted to use her to once again to wreak havoc on the Earth and Satyr desired to control her. However, Dokuro hid her from the enemy factions by giving her a human body and assigning her to Earth, where she grew to love the human world.^{[ch. 266]} After Keima saves the world, he tells her to do as she wishes. Wanting to stay with Keima, she chooses her "true ending" and becomes his real sister.^{[ch. 267]}

=== Haqua ===
Voiced by: Saori Hayami (Japanese); Jessica Boone (Season 2), Jessica Calvello (Season 3, OVAs) (English)

Haqua du Lot Herminium or Haqua d'rot Herminium (ハクア・ド・ロット・ヘルミニウム, Hakua do Lotto Heruminiumu)^{[vol. 4:omake]}, (Note: angelfrench [@angelfrench] (June 2, 2010). "今はHAQUAが正式みたいです。どうも混乱させて申しわけないです" (Tweet) – via Twitter.(in Japanese) - "HAQUA is official now seems. It is not so much sorry for the confusion") a former classmate of Elsie's and the District Chief Spirit Hunter of Area 32 in Nagumo City.^{[ch. 22]} She has a strong academic background,^{[ch. 22]} but has found the professional world extremely difficult to dominate in the same way. She is introduced in a story where she is hunting down a Loose Soul that she was responsible for unleashing. She becomes frustrated in her efforts to capture it and the Loose Soul possesses her. Fortunately Elsie is able to free her, after some encouragement from Keima.^{[ch. 24-26]} As a Spirit Hunter, she has a skull-shaped hair ornament and magical raiment like Elsie's, but instead of a broom, she wields a 'Scythe of Testament', an award for being valedictorian of her class.^{[ch. 25]} Her human partner, much to her dismay when compared to Keima, is Yukie Marui, a 54-year-old saleswoman.^{[ch. 47,48]}

Keima occasionally uses Haqua to get a better understanding of demons, their history, and his own plight^{[ch. 47,105]} and occasionally entrusts her with confidential information that Elsie would not understand. Although she is annoyed by Keima's odd behavior and personality, Haqua seems to develop feelings for him. In a 2012 Biglobe poll of favorite tsundere characters, Haqua ranked 15. When she is embarrassed by Keima, she usually retaliates with physical harm.^{[ch. 25,26]} One of the recurring gags with Haqua is that Keima has walked in on her while she is in the bathroom or vice versa,^{[ch. 48,73,121]} which results in Keima being hurt.^{[ch. 73,121]} While Elsie pretends to be Kanon Nakagawa during the search for the Jupiter Sisters, Haqua teams up with Keima and pretends to be Elsie at school.^{[ch. 118]}

In a meeting of Spirit Hunter district chiefs, Haqua raises a question regarding the mandate to capture the Goddesses, and then asks Dokuro Skull for help.^{[ch. 150-151]} She is then arrested by Vintage loyalists,^{[ch. 152]} who interrogate her then detain her for treason.^{[ch. 156]} She is removed from her position as district chief position which is given to Lune. Haqua is rescued by Dokuro, who smuggles her back to the human world to help Keima.^{[ch. 160,161]} She saves Keima, Ayumi, and Chihiro from a Vintage attack^{[ch. 175,176]} and then fights Lune to give Keima time to complete his conquest of Ayumi.^{[ch. 184-187]} After the Jupiter Sisters are all revealed, and Apollo is revived, she is reinstated as a district chief.^{[ch. 191]}

Wakaki originally planned for Haqua to be more overbearing, but changed it so she "encourages the low-ranking girl". Wakaki based her on his experiences as a high school upperclassman: the academic struggles and pressures faced by honor students of becoming number one, staying there, and facing other number ones.^{[vol. 3:extras]} He named her after the "Cretaceous (白亜, Hakua)" period; he also considered Jura from the Jurassic period.

=== Tenri Ayukawa ===
Voiced by: Kaori Nazuka (Japanese); Juliet Simmons (English)

Tenri Ayukawa (鮎川 天理, Ayukawa Tenri)^{[vol. 7:omake]} is a shy 17-year-old girl who was a childhood best friend and neighbor of the Katsuragis ten years ago.^{[ch. 57]} When she and her mother visit, Keima does not remember her.^{[ch. 57]} In a confrontation with Keima, Tenri responds angrily as if she has another personality.^{[ch. 58,59]} Both Elsie and Nora detect a Loose Spirit within her,^{[ch. 57,58]} but it is actually a Goddess named Diana.^{[ch. 64]} Ten years previously, during a school trip, Keima and Tenri were stranded on an island. In a cave passage that they discovered, they witnessed the Loose Spirits known as Weiss escape from Hell.^{[ch. 62,63]} Tenri accepts Diana's spirit in order to save herself and Keima.^{[ch. 63]} In order to save Diana from Nora's wrath, Tenri agrees to stage a fake capture by falling in love with Keima.^{[ch. 64]} Soon after, she and her mother move next door to the Katsuragis.^{[ch. 64]}

Tenri talks with Diana by using reflective surfaces.^{[ch. 59]} On occasion, she lets Diana take over, which gives her the ability to leap from great heights and other superhuman powers,^{[ch. 58,61]} However, she refuses to flirt with Keima, despite Diana's urgings.^{[ch. 65]} She enjoys popping sheets of bubble wrap,^{[ch. 57]} and performing magic tricks.^{[ch. 65]}

Wakaki has mentioned that Tenri resembles Diana Barry, from the Anne of Green Gables anime. (Note: lc_bot [@lc_bot] (August 13, 2010). "お母様と一緒に、赤毛のアンというアニメを見ましたー。ダイアナさんが天理さんにそっくりですー。" (Tweet) – via Twitter.(in Japanese)) She is named after Tenri Station in Tenri, Nara.

== Supporting characters ==
=== Targets ===
The human girls who house the spirits known as loose souls that Keima must capture range in demographics from juniors and schoolmates to university students and career women. Each girl has a personal problem that the spirit feeds on, and unconsciously taps into the spirit's energy to manifest supernatural powers that are reflective of their personalities.^{[ch. 8]} If the loose soul is not removed by the time it reaches its full power, it will take over its host,^{[ch. 18]} and eventually the spirit is reborn as the girl's child.^{[ch. 3]} To expel the spirit, Keima must make the girl fall in love with him; this is signified by a kiss.^{[ch. 1]} After the loose soul is free, the girl no longer remembers Keima as her memories are edited so that she remembers doing activities with someone else,^{[ch. 87,92,101]} however, some of the girls continue to have feelings for Keima,^{[ch. 1,55]} especially those who are involved with the Jupiter Sisters.

The human girls that Keima has helped are listed in order of first capture.

==== Ayumi Takahara ====
Voiced by: Ayana Taketatsu (Japanese); Kaytha Coker (Season 1), Elizabeth Bunch (Seasons 2-3) (English)

Ayumi Takahara (高原 歩美, Takahara Ayumi)^{[vol. 1:extra]} is Keima's classmate on the school's track team. Wakaki chose Ayumi for the first chapter because, when he was in school, he always had a crush on sports girls; his previous work also featured one.^{[vol. 1:extra]} She is named after Takanohara Station in Nara, Nara.

In her storyline, Keima tries to cheer her on, but when she fakes an ankle injury to appease some jealous seniors, Keima encourages her to compete. She thus becomes Keima's first capture, although after the Loose Soul is freed, she has no memory of what happened.^{[ch. 1]} She and Chihiro are friends, and they form a band called 2B Pencils, where she plays guitar.^{[ch. 54]} In later chapters, she continues to greet Keima in a friendly, but sometimes violent manner.^{[ch. 80,90,119]}

Ayumi appears in various storylines, but becomes a target again during Keima's hunt for the Jupiter Sisters, After seeing that Chihiro likes Keima, she offers her support,^{[ch. 153-157]}, but becomes furious when Keima rejects her.^{[ch. 167,172,173]} When Keima tries to confess to Ayumi instead,^{[ch. 179-182]} she questions his motives, having learned that Keima has been using pre-fabricated game lines to woo her.^{[ch. 181-182]} She eventually relents and agrees to participate in a "wedding ending", which consists of saying vows and a kiss, the latter of which frees Mercury, the goddess that has been residing in her and who has been driving much of her conflicting feelings towards Keima.^{[ch. 183-187]}

==== Mio Aoyama ====
Voiced by: Aoi Yūki (Japanese); Hilary Haag (English)

In Wakaki's preceding one-shot story Make Love?! God!! (恋して?! 神様！!, Koishite?! Kami-sama!!)^{[vol. 1:omake]}, Mio serves as the heroine: a wealthy daughter whose surname is Tsumagawa, whom Keima tries to woo by persistently showing up in front of her home. She is won over when he presents her with a toy ring that she had lost; the ring, although worth only 100 yen, had sentimental value.

In the series, Mio Aoyama (青山 美生, Aoyama Mio)^{[vol. 1:omake]} is an elitist daughter of a company president. Keima considers her an easy capture because she displays 99% tsundere (hard exterior, sensitive interior) characteristics such as cat-like eyes, bright hair parted into twin tails, and a prominent forehead.^{[ch. 3]} After Keima learns that she is no longer wealthy, he woos her by acting as her chauffeur after her butler Morita had quit. At a society party, Keima encourages her to let go of her past and move on as her father would wish. After being freed from the loose soul, she acts more humbly, but slightly friendlier towards him.^{[ch. 4]} She later works at a bakery with her mother,^{[ch. 86]} She is childhood friends with Yui Goido and Urara Shiratori.^{[ch. 216-217]} Mio is named after Aoyamachō Station in Iga, Mie.

==== Kanon Nakagawa ====
Voiced by: Nao Tōyama (Japanese); Brittney Karbowski (English)

Kanon Nakagawa (中川 かのん, Nakagawa Kanon)^{[vol. 2:omake]} (Note: In the magazine serialization, Kanon's original last name was Nishihara (西原, Nishihara), but was corrected to Nakagawa in the tankōbon. - Wakaki, Tamiki (June 20, 2008). "6/20:FLAG10「Shining Star」". HoneyDipped (in Japanese).. Kanon's 4-panel comic also discusses the change.^{[vol. 2:omake]}) is a 16-year-old idol who wears glasses. Wakaki created her in response to a comeback trend on idols from Morning Musume and The Idolmaster game. He considers her storyline traditional and "a tribute to the old days when there was a professional idol".^{[vol. 2:extras]}, and describes her as a "yan-idol" (an idol with yandere tendencies) as she zaps Keima with a taser.^{[ch. 7]}^{[vol. 2:author's notes]}

In her scenario, she makes it her goal to win Keima over, even forcing him to listen to her sing.^{[ch. 8]} But when he ignores her advances, she becomes despondent and turns invisible, prompting Keima to support her. She then contacts him regularly, but on the day of her big concert, she is overwhelmed by fear and fades again.^{[ch. 9]} Keima encourages her to believe in herself (which Wakaki notes is contrary to the typical idol nurturing game pattern^{[vol. 2:author's notes]} ) and to not depend on others' affirmations, including his own.^{[ch. 10]} In the anime, Kanon's worry is changed to failing in public. Two years before, she was part of a pop idol group, Citron, but her rising popularity resulted in their disbandment, giving her lots of guilt since. She learns that her former bandmates hold no animosity against her, and want her to do well.^{[vol. 2:omake]}

Though her memories were altered, Kanon begins to remember her time with Keima because she is the host of the Goddess Apollo. However, she becomes suspicious of some mysterious stalkers where she becomes paranoid and then confesses her love for Keima in front of their class. Apollo takes over her body, and retreats, however, she is stabbed by Fiore with a demon-enchanted dagger and placed in a coma.^{[ch. 114-118]} Although Vulcan and Diana remove the dagger, she remains comatose as Apollo has placed a protection spell that encases Kanon's body.^{[ch. 136]} With the help of four of the Jupiter Sisters, Keima manages to contact Kanon within her dream world where both she and Apollo warn Keima of an upcoming threat.^{[ch. 158-160]}

Kanon is featured in a three chapter spinoff titled Magical Star Kanon 100% in Shogakukan's Weekly Shonen Sunday magazine, in which she plays a magical girl. She is named after Ise-Nakagawa Station in Matsusaka, Mie.

==== Shiori Shiomiya ====
Voiced by: Kana Hanazawa (Japanese); Hilary Haag (English)

Shiori Shiomiya (汐宮 栞, Shiomiya Shiori)^{[vol. 2:omake]} is a shy and reticent student librarian;^{[ch. 13]} Wakaki comments that her character type is a main property of girl games,^{[vol. 2:extras]} (Note: Wakaki's editor is also a big fan of Shiori Shiomiya.^{[vol. 2:extras]}) and created her to represent and "to cheer for those eloquent people who don't speak."^{[vol. 2:extras]}

Shiori, like Keima, escapes from reality, but uses books instead of games. She keeps to herself, and hides behind her book to avoid eye contact with Keima, but when she sees Keima scribble in a library book, she confronts him and calls him "stupid" much to her shock. When the Library Committee threatens to get rid of books in order to make a media center, she becomes silently frustrated but locks herself in the library in protest. Keima helps her by exposing her conflict between wanting to speak out to others and being afraid of offending people, and by vowing to support her. After they kiss, Shiori confidently speaks her mind to the Library Committee.^{[ch. 13-16]} (Note: In the 4-panel bonus comics, Shiori states that they saved a number of the books and she kept some of them for herself.^{[vol. 2:omake]}) With her faint memories of Keima, she writes a short story.^{[vol. 2:omake]}

Shiori returns to the series when Keima notices her return to her shy ways, and suspects that she may be harboring a Jupiter sister.^{[ch. 124]} After Keima makes edits and additions to one of her stories she is writing,^{[ch. 128]} Shiori asks him to help with a submission for the school festival. However, she is shocked when he makes a romantic move on a boy (actually Yui Goido) and cross-dresses, and then discovers a shy bookworm girl in the library.^{[ch. 145]} She wants to write about Keima but suffers a major case of writer's block.^{[ch. 146,147]} Keima encourages her to write about herself, and she is able to finish her submission.^{[ch. 148,149]} He praises her work, and gives her a kiss, after which the bookworm girl introduces herself properly as the Jupiter sister Minerva, who resides in her.^{[ch. 150]}

She is named after Shionomiya Station in Kawachinagano, Osaka.

==== Kusunoki Kasuga ====
Voiced by: Ami Koshimizu (Japanese); Maggie Flecknoe (English)

Kusunoki Kasuga (春日 楠, Kasuga Kusunoki)^{[vol. 3:omake]} is an 18-year-old third-year Majima Academy student, and sole member of the school's Girls Karate Club.^{[ch. 18]} A practitioner of her family's Ancient Martial Arts, Kasuga-Style, Life And Death Technique (古式武術 春日流 羅新活殺術, Koshikibujutsu Kasugaryuu Rashinkassatsujutsu) Kenpō, Kusunoki is the heir to her father's dojo since childhood, after her older sister Hinoki left.^{[ch. 19]} The resulting need to prove herself and be like Hinoki causes Kusunoki to desire becoming stronger while disregarding her femininity as a weakness.

Kusunoki is introduced when she saves Keima and Elsie from some delinquent boys.^{[ch. 18]} Though she sees Keima as a weakling, she accepts his request to become her disciple in the Girls Karate Club as most of the members had quit. When Keima and Elsie spot her petting a cat, Kusunoki tries to throw it off the building, but her feminine side manifests as a spirit and saves it. Although she is shocked at the spirit's appearance, Kusunoki desires to separate from her feminine side to finally defeat her personified weakness.^{[ch. 19]} Elsie suggests that Kusunoki date Keima to draw out the spirit; they spend the day out when Kusunoki suggests a kiss, which draws out her feminine side who reveals her own desire to become the dominant aspect.^{[ch. 20]} After the two Kusunokis fight, Keima convinces Kusunoki to accept her other self. The feminine Kusunoki agrees, and fuses back into Kusunoki, momentarily controlling her body so she can kiss Keima which forces the Loose Spirit out.^{[ch. 21]} (Note: Since Kusunoki has embraced her feminine side, she has adopted the cat that frequented her club.^{[vol. 3:omake]} In the final episode of the second anime season, Kusunoki works out with some new girls who have joined her karate club.)

Later on, Kusunoki is heading a group of students at the family dojo, and receives a visit from Hinoki, as well as Keima and Elsie. Keima requests to join the dojo; she remembers that Keima did that before, but assumed that she did not date him, and she went to the amusement park with her students instead.^{[ch. 90-92]} Keima learns that Kusunoki's struggle with her femininity came because her sister, whom she admired the most, left for America after middle school over a disagreement with their father regarding inheriting the dojo. She spars with Hinoki but thinks she lost. Keima surprises her in the bath twice, but the second time, he asks for her help to confront her sister who has become a giant. She and Keima go into Hinoki's heart where she fights a possessed Hinoki. She eventually defeats the spirit that possesses her sister; she tells her she never wanted her sister to be perfect, and that she loves her. Afterwards, she does not remember the events but her relationship with her sister is better, that is, until her sister french kisses Keima.^{[ch. 95-101]}

Wakaki based many of the girls after people he was close to in high school, but developed Kusunoki from the mother of main character Yuuki of his previous work, Holy Crystal Albatross (聖結晶アルバトロス, Seikesshō Arubatorosu), speculating what the mom would be like when she was younger. He wanted to combine a motherly and masculine character, with aspects of self-sacrifice, compassion, and extension of motherhood.^{[vol. 3:extras]} She is named after Kusu Station in Yokkaichi, Mie.

==== Chihiro Kosaka ====
Voiced by: Kana Asumi (Japanese); Serena Varghese (Season 1), Brittney Karbowski (Season 2), Cynthia Martinez (Season 3, OVAs) (English)

Chihiro Kosaka (小阪 ちひろ, Kosaka Chihiro; also Chihiro Kosaka)^{[vol. 4:omake]} is a 17-year-old classmate, and friend of Ayumi and Elsie. Wakaki's theme for the series has been "looking at the reality in gaming terms" so "it was inevitable a normal girl would eventually become a target". He originally wanted to build her supporting role slowly but his staff wanted her to be spotlighted, so he developed the storyline. She represents "the other girls who do not get the spotlight in girl games."^{[vol. 4:extras]} But while she acts "like a background character with no defining characteristics," Chihiro actually has an inferiority complex and prefers running from the reality of her status.^{[ch. 28]}

She has a casual habit of confessing to boys, being rejected, and cheerfully moving to another guy, which irritates Keima.^{[ch. 29]} However, Ayumi tricks both of them into doing cleaning duty together with Chihiro making her peace with Keima as he offers his services to help her win the heart of a boy named Yuta. ^{[ch. 30]} However, by the day of the confession, Chihiro pulls out at the last second and walks off. ^{[ch. 31]} Realizing he focused more on the romance than the girl, Keima finds Chihiro and convinces her that as long as she wants it, nothing can stop her from becoming special. Soon after the Loose Soul inside her is purged by Keima's kiss, Chihiro gathered enough confidence to start the music band 2B Pencils with herself as lead singer and guitarist.^{[ch. 32]} Her group's membership includes Ayumi on guitar, Elsie on bass, and Miyako Terada on keyboards/synthesizers, and later Yui Goido on drums.^{[ch. 54, 90]}

After learning that Kanon Nakagawa confessed to Keima, Chihiro acts a little jealous, which leads Keima to believe she may be hosting one of Jupiter Sisters.^{[ch. 119]} Later in Keima's "sick play" scenario, Chihiro, after performing her little made up tune, confesses to Keima.^{[ch. 156,157]} Chihiro asks Keima out for the school festival, and they go to a secluded building rooftop, but Keima realizes that Chihiro has no memory of her previous kiss (i.e. she is not hosting a Jupiter Sister). Although Chihiro has liked Keima before he started conquering real girls, Keima rejects her harshly, and says he only likes game girls.^{[ch. 166]} Later Chihiro is dragged into Keima's effort to conquer Ayumi, and despite learning that he must win her heart as fast as possible, she disapproves of his game-related schemes; she reveals the fake scheming to Ayumi so that Keima must conquer Ayumi with his "true feelings", but also joins him to witness the event as Vintage has been targeting her.^{[ch. 182-187]} After Ayumi's goddess is empowered and the Jupiter Sisters prevail over Vintage, Chihiro returns to the festival to play with 2B Pencils; she plays the song that she wrote, a song about a lost first love, and has tearful memories of Keima.^{[ch. 188,189]} (Note: In the epilogue, Keima sits on a school rooftop bench by himself crying and he says to the absent Chihiro (who, ironically, is on-stage performing her song right at that moment) that he did not mean his harsh words to her.^{[ch. 189]}) At the end of the manga, Keima confesses his love for her,^{[ch. 267]} and she initially rejects him but she eventually accepts his feelings.^{[ch. 268]}

She is named after Kawachi-Kosaka Station in Higashiosaka, Osaka.

==== Jun Nagase ====
Voiced by: Aki Toyosaki (Japanese); Cynthia Martinez (English)

Jun Nagase (長瀬 純, Nagase Jun)^{[vol. 5:omake]} is a 21-year-old Narusawa University student who returns to Maijima Academy for two weeks to teach Keima's class.^{[ch. 36]} Wakaki paired her story with Tsukiyo Kujyo's since both girls struggle with pursuing ideals and applying them to reality.^{[vol. 5:extras]}

Although she is liked by many students, Jun is bothered by Keima's gaming, and after a Loose Spirit enters her, (Note: In the manga, Jun Nagase is the first girl in the series where the Loose Spirit is shown physically entering its target.^{[ch. 36]} Previously Haqua’s Loose Spirit was shown in frame just outside her. ^{[ch. 25]}) makes it her personal agenda to reform him.^{[ch. 36]} She foils Keima's "teacher route" strategy by socializing with him during school hours, (Note: According to Keima, the teacher route is a difficult strategy where the student has to meet the teacher outside of school, or eventually graduate for the relationship to progress.^{[ch. 37]}) but starts to waver when Keima tells her not to look at people using her own standards.^{[ch. 38]}

Jun loses her temper on her unmotivated students, but runs away. She is surprised to find that she and Keima have the same seat at a pro wrestling event. (Note: Jun Nagase's favorite wrestler is Jumbo Tsuruma, whom the students have not heard of and the teachers hardly remember; he is based on pro wrestler Jumbo Tsuruta, who won the first ever All Japan Pro Wrestling Triple Crown Heavyweight Championship. In the story, there is a picture of Jumbo bearing three championship belts.^{[ch. 36]}) She expresses her frustration over Keima's stubbornness, but he counters by saying her zeal is what caused her basketball team to disband.^{[ch. 40]} (Note: Yuri Nikaido reveals that she and Jun were on the high school basketball team.^{[ch. 39]}) The next day, Jun tries to have her students participate in a marathon, but explodes in anger again when they do not care, and she runs away.^{[ch. 40]} In her old locker room, she is surprised again by Keima, who confronts her about forcing ideals on people. Just as she is about to give up, he comforts her and tells her not to give up so easily, even when faced with opposition, after all she is a teacher; the students then arrive and apologize.^{[ch. 41]} On the last day of her teaching assignment, he tells her to come back, and she gratefully kisses him.^{[ch. 41]}

At university, Jun encounters Keima, who claims he has become a better student. When Keima introduces Haqua as his "girlfriend", Jun congratulates him without showing any signs of jealousy. She recalls the wrestling event but does not remember Keima there; Keima thus concludes she does not host one of the Jupiter Sisters.^{[ch. 120]}

She is named after Nagase Station in Higashiosaka, Osaka.

==== Tsukiyo Kujo ====
Voiced by: Yuka Iguchi (Japanese); Caitlynn French (English)

Tsukiyo Kujō (九条 月夜, Kujō Tukiyo)^{[vol. 5:omake]} is a short, blonde 17-year-old Majima Academy student who frequently sits on the school rooftop in an "observatory" (a rug that covers a bench) where she watches the moon through a telescope with her doll, Luna.^{[ch. 43]} Wakaki paired her story with Jun Nagase's as both girls struggle with pursuing ideals and having them clash with reality.^{[vol. 5:extras]} She meets Keima when he accidentally steps into her domain, and they have an argument over what is "true beauty". Tsukiyo wishes to be beautiful like Luna, but then discovers she has shrunk to the size of her doll.^{[ch. 43]} She enjoys life as a doll; Keima arrives and tries to accommodate her.^{[ch. 44,45]} She then finds that she shrank again, except that she overhears that Keima and Elsie have tricked her by resizing the room. She escapes to the roof.^{[ch. 45,46]} Keima convinces her that beauty does exist in the real world, and should be enjoyed with others. She accidentally falls off the roof, but Keima jumps to save her; she apologizes and they kiss.^{[ch. 46]} Afterwards, Tsukiyo still goes to her observatory with Luna, but without the rug that blocked her from the real world; she watches Keima through her telescope while she blushes slightly.^{[ch. 46]}

After hearing that Kanon Nagakawa and Keima are a couple, Tsukiyo reappears at her observatory with the rug.^{[ch. 123]} She becomes furious when Keima invades her space and when he tries to shush her from Ayumi.^{[ch. 123]} The next day, Keima apologizes for the Kanon rumors.^{[ch. 126]} Later, Luna sees Keima is interacting with Shiori at the library; she attacks him and tells him to leave Tsukiyo alone.^{[ch. 131,132]} Keima finds Tsukiyo on the school rooftop, but she is possessed by the goddess Vulcan, who also possesses Luna.^{[ch. 131-133]} But when Vulcan is about to finish off Keima, Tsukiyo stops her, and reveals she trusts Keima's caring words. After a kiss, she enables Vulcan to manifest her wings and to recover her powers.^{[ch. 135]}

She is named after Kujō Station in Yamatokoriyama, Nara.

==== Minami Ikoma ====
Voiced by: Satomi Akesaka

Minami Ikoma (井駒 みなみ, Ikoma Minami)^{[vol. 6:omake]} is a 15-year-old Majima Academy Middle School student and member of their Swim Club.^{[ch. 50]} (Note: Minami is nicknamed "Bird Nest", because of her messy hair that does not straighten due to the chlorine from swim practice.^{[ch. 51]}) Wakaki wrote her story near the first anniversary of the series, and mostly from her perspective, to make it different from the others. He also wrote the story when he was playing an old wandering-type gal game where the player had to chase down a target instead of choosing from an abundance of girls. The final scene at the festival was based on his personal experiences.^{[vol. 6:extras]}

As the third alternate for the school team's final meet, Minami talks with her friends who are alternates on what they will do; Minami takes it very hard that her swimming career might be over.^{[ch. 50]} When she visits the high school, she encounters Elsie briefly, who is looking for a boy with glasses (Keima).^{[ch. 50]} One evening after practice, Minami returns to the pool and sees a handsome boy with tremendous swimming ability, but her friends tell her that he is Keima, an extremely weird boy who always plays games.^{[ch. 51]}

As Minami stalks Keima, she gets strong feelings in her chest. On their second encounter on the bus, Keima asks her out to the local Tanabata Festival.^{[ch. 52]} They have a good time, but when the festival ends, she begins to panic. When she sees Keima leave, she chases after him. Keima tells her that moving on and accepting the past is a part of growing up, but no matter what happens, she will always have memories in her heart; he kisses her.^{[ch. 53]} Afterwards, Minami decides to continue swimming, and her friends remark that she seems mature.^{[ch. 53]}

Minami learns of the rumor that Keima is dating Kanon Nakagawa, but when Keima shows up in her class, she does not remember who he is. Before leaving, Keima asks Minami if she is still practicing swimming, and wishes her luck.^{[ch. 120]}

She is named after Ikoma Station in Ikoma, Nara.

==== Rieko Hinaga ====
Rieko Hinaga (日永 梨枝子, Hinaga Rieko)^{[vol. 8:omake]} is a neighbor of Keima's grandparents. Wakaki originally planned the story to be about a hospitalized girl and her grandmother, but the idea was shelved as he could not persuade his staff. He changed the story to reflect his experiences in visiting his grandparents when he was a child, seeing the next generation, and pondering the meaning of life.^{[vol. 8:extra]}

While visiting his grandparents to celebrate the Obon festival with the rest of the Katsuragi family, Keima and Elsie meet Rieko and her granddaughter Airi, a little girl with "large fish eyes" who makes scary remarks such as "I want to cut your head off."^{[ch. 67]} At night, an apparition of Airi appears in the graveyard.^{[ch. 66,67]} The next night, Keima confronts the ghost, who is actually Rieko's spirit as a child; she changes her form to a teenager, and talks about how she misses her family and friends who have departed. However, both she and Keima agree that she was able to live a long and happy life, which fills the gap in her heart.^{[ch. 68]}

==== Sumire Uemoto ====
Sumire Uemoto (上本 スミレ, Uemoto Sumire)^{[vol. 8:omake]} is a 17-year-old girl whom Keima and Elsie encounter when they look for a ramen place. She beats them to ordering the last bowl, until Elsie interferes.^{[ch. 69]} She works at a small restaurant called Uemoto-ya where her father is the chef. They have a thorny relationship where she wants to be a chef, but her father refuses.^{[ch. 70]}

Sumire is shocked that her father offers Keima a job at the restaurant, but is accepting of his hard work and dedication.^{[ch. 70]} She tells Keima that she wants to run the store and is developing a unique recipe of Sweet Ramen.^{[ch. 71]} Keima, at first, dislikes the sweet food, but agrees to taste test her trials.^{[ch. 71]} They eventually present one to Sumire's father, but he refuses it.^{[ch. 71]} Keima realizes the root of the problem: both have the same goal of wanting the other person to be happy.^{[ch. 71,72]} Later, Sumire's father tries another bowl of ramen, but this time, it tastes exactly like his; Sumire explains that she learned it from being in the family business for so long, and states she is happy with staying in it. Sumire's father relents; he renames the restaurant "Sumire-ya", and makes her an owner. After Keima resigns, Sumire asks him to come back as a customer, and thanks him with a bowl of donburi and a kiss. The store later becomes popular because of its Sweet Ramen.^{[ch. 72]}

Wakaki focused on theme of winning over the girl's father rather than the girl itself. He was inspired by a recent event involving a parent who interfered with his child's life. He originally had Sumire be more like a princess who wanted to live among commoners but shelved that idea for a later story.^{[vol. 8:extras]}

She is named after Uehonmachi Station (上本町駅) in Osaka, Osaka.

==== Nanaka Haibara ====
Nanaka Haibara (榛原 七香, Haibara Nanaka)^{[vol. 9:omake]} is a 17-year-old red haired student from Maijima Municipal Misato East High School, and an expert shogi player. Wakaki developed her story around the concept of winning, and fit it in with the Diana story.^{[vol. 9:extras]} She speaks with a Kansai dialect and has returned from overseas.^{[ch. 76,77]} (Note: Wakaki has mentioned that Nanaka Haibara is the kind of character he likes, and that he enjoys her Kansai dialect.^{[vol. 9:extras]}) Keima and Elsie encounter her as she searches for Keima (the knight piece), and she then defeats the Maikou shogi club leader.^{[ch. 76]} Nanaka's goal is to beat her rival, who is revealed to be her classmate, Tenri Ayukawa (actually Diana, who took over Tenri's body)^{[ch. 76,77]}

Nanaka tracks down Tenri and challenges her to a match, but Keima intervenes and tells her to play him first.^{[ch. 77]} Although he does not know the initial placement, Keima wins the game.^{[ch. 77]} (Note: Keima has played shogi through his gal games.^{[ch. 77]}) She later arrives to hear about Tenri and the girls argue over kissing Keima, but also sees that Tenri beat Keima in a match.^{[ch. 77,78]} Keima offers to help Nanaka train; they engage in some practice games where Keima initially beat her, but eventually they end up about even.^{[ch. 78]} Keima arranges for a final match between Nanaka and Tenri. Nanaka is about to lose, but when Tenri makes a mistake on her drop piece, Nanaka counters with a winning move.^{[ch. 79]} She thanks her "Third Knight" Keima with a kiss.^{[ch. 79]} Afterwards, Nanaka still continues to play shogi with Tenri, but in one of her matches, she confuses the Knight piece for the King piece much to her bewilderment.^{[vol. 9:omake]}

She is named after Haibara Station in Uda, Nara.

==== Yui Goido ====
Voiced by: Ayahi Takagaki (Japanese); Krystal LaPorte (English)

Yui Goidō (五位堂 結, Goidō Yui)^{[vol. 10:omake]} is a 16-year-old Majima Academy student who loves to play the drums.^{[ch. 81]} The second daughter of the Goidōs, one of the oldest and richest families in Majima City, Yui's life has always been ruled by her parents who insist that she becomes a proper lady. However, Yui wishes to have more freedom in her life but is unable to voice her complaint to her parents, especially her overbearing mother. After she is forced to quit the Music Instrument club, she accidentally slips on the stairs and falls on Keima; her mother rushes in to protect her and thinks Keima assaulted Yui.^{[ch. 81]}

Yui bumps into Keima at the stairs the next day; Keima attempts to charm her, but Yui's mother interferes again. That night, Keima plans to visit Yui, but both Keima and Yui suffer a headache and collapse; when they come to, they realize they have switched bodies.^{[ch. 82]} (Note: The cause of the body swap between Keima and Yui is the Loose Spirit which tries to fulfill Yui's desires.^{[ch. 83]}) With Elsie as the only other person to know their predicament, Keima promises Yui that he will try to find a way to fix it.^{[ch. 83]} At first both of them wanted to get back to their original bodies but soon they started feeling comfortable with their new bodies with Yui enjoying her new freedom of being a boy and talking like one,^{[ch. 83,84]} and she takes an interest in Chihiro's 2-B Pencils band.^{[ch. 85]}. Keima (as Yui) becomes attracted to otome games (games for girls, where the theme is about falling in love with men) much to his horror.^{[ch. 84-86]} But after his encounter with Mio lifts his spirits, Keima figures out how to force Yui's spirit out.^{[ch. 87]} Thanks to his new knowledge from Otome games, Keima decides to become a "Damsel in Distress" in order to make her "Prince Charming", Yui, rescue him. Using her feelings for him, Keima pretends to be sick to make Yui worry about him which finally gives her the courage to sneak into her home to stand up to her mother and be with Keima who she loves and kisses him which forces the spirit out. However, Elsie is unable to catch the spirit as it has become a Level 4 and is too powerful, but thanks to the help of mysterious ally, Yui's spirit is finally captured.^{[ch. 87-89]}

After getting back to their original bodies, Yui becomes more independent from her family by becoming a tomboy and dressing in boys clothes,^{[ch. 89]} which gains her a huge popularity at school with both boys and girls.^{[ch. 141]} With her love of playing drums, she becomes the drummer of the 2-B Pencils with her new friends.^{[ch. 90]}

Soon after the big confession to Keima by Kanon Nakagawa, Yui approaches Keima at the library and confesses her love for him, which shocks Shiori and Haqua, who thought she was a boy.^{[ch. 124,125]} She then waits for him at the school gate and wants him to go on a date with her where he cross-dresses as a girl.^{[ch. 129]} When Keima does so and asks her out, Yui retreats to the restroom where she meets the awakened Goddess Mars.^{[ch. 141,142]} During their date, Keima is kidnapped by a Vintage member^{[ch. 142]} (Haqua in disguise) which prompts her to rescue Keima.^{[ch. 143]} Keima then kisses her, which restores Mars's wings.^{[ch. 143]} Afterwards, Keima tells both Mars and Yui to lie low and be careful about Vintage.^{[ch. 144]}

Wakaki originally had Sumire Uemoto be the princess who wanted to live among commoners but shelved that idea until this storyline.^{[vol. 8:extras]} Inspired by older gender bender manga where girls act like guys and vice versa, he wanted to do a similar story. He contrasts the reluctantly ladylike Yui with the reluctantly manly Kusunoki.^{[vol. 10:extras]} She is named after Goidō Station in Kashiba, Nara.

==== Hinoki Kasuga ====
Hinoki Kasuga (春日 檜, Kasuga Hinoki)^{[vol. 11:omake]} is 20-year-old eccentric fashion designer, and older sister of Kusunoki Kasuga.^{[ch. 90,91]} She first meets Keima and Elsie when she saves them from some delinquents.^{[ch. 90]} (Note: Hinoki's introduction is similar to her sister Kusunoki's introduction as both of them save Keima and Elsie from some delinquents.^{[ch. 18,90]}.) She has a loud, adventurous and ambitious personality; she drives a Mitsuoka Himiko sports car and uses a megaphone.^{[ch. 90]} She has returned to Japan after being in the United States for five years where she has also worked as actress and artist.^{[ch. 90-92]} She is not embarrassed by any of Keima's romantic schemes such as planting his face in her breasts, or trying to peep on her in the bath.^{[ch. 91]} At first, Keima is unable to find anything negative about her but, when she talks about having big dreams, she appears to him as a giant.^{[ch. 92]} She later tries to recruit Keima away from Kusunoki, and beats her in a sparring match, where Keima notices she is a giant again.^{[ch. 93]} Keima tries another peep on her in the bath, but after she foils his attempt, she realizes she has become a giant, and this time she cannot return to normal.^{[ch. 95,96]}

Hinoki tells Keima that when she was overseas, she noticed one part of her body grew big, but others could not see that, and when her whole body became big, she returned to Japan to rest.^{[ch. 96]} After taking care of her, Keima learns that Hinoki wanted to keep up her image of being bigger and better than her sister, but it causes a considerable amount of stress and pressure to Hinoki.^{[ch. 96]} After Keima leaves, Hinoki goes into town when she sees Kusunoki (Fiore in disguise), who shames her and tells her she should die; this shocks her and she grows even bigger, and becomes visible to everyone in the city.^{[ch. 97]} Keima arrives and has her swallow a pill (Kusunoki in disguise).^{[ch. 98]} Inside Hinoki's heart, Keima and Kusunoki confront a possessed Hinoki who has been envious that Kusunoki has become strong while she continued to wander and try different things.^{[ch. 99]} The Loose Soul becomes stronger in hatred, but Kusunoki is able to subdue her by telling her that she never wanted her to be perfect, but would still admire Hinoki no matter what. That finally calms her heart and forces the Loose Soul out.^{[ch. 100]} Afterwards, she decides to return to the US to continue her job and find her own path, but not before giving a french kiss to Keima, much to Kusunoki's anger and embarrassment.^{[ch. 101]} In the 4-panel section, Hinoki tries to make her sister more daring by changing out her underwear, and orders her to confess to Keima.^{[vol. 11:omake]}

Wakaki developed Hinoki's character during an appreciation ceremony for the finalists of the Shogakukan Manga Awards where his editor requested that Keima try to conquer a "flashy and sexy woman". Wakaki originally intended that to be Yui Goido's older sister, but she already made a minor appearance in that story, so he planned the woman for the next storyline. He called Hinoki and Kusunoki the "Giant Tree Sisters";^{[vol. 11:extra]} as Hinoki stands for Japanese cypress, and Kusunoki stands for camphor laurel.^{[vol. 11:extra]}

Although he considers Hinoki's flashy or sexy exterior a bit shallow in development, Wakaki based Hinoki's interior character on his deeply personal experience of coming out of college where he did not try anything, and was unemployed at age 30.^{[vol. 11:extra]}

==== Akari Kurakawa ====
Voiced by: Ai Shimizu (Japanese); Tiffany Terrell (English)

Akari Kurakawa (倉川 灯, Kurakawa Akari) is a petite girl from Majima Academy and a member of the Biology Club who is obsessed with the idea of creating the perfect human.^{[ch. 109,110]} At first, Keima assumes she has a Loose Soul, because she triggers Elsie's skull badge detector. When he tries to help her with the robot and gives her a kiss, no spirits are freed.^{[ch. 110,111]} Instead, Akari becomes curious about kissing; she kisses him multiple times to see if she can make her robot more human, but then discards him altogether, as he is imperfect, which leaves him flustered.^{[ch. 111]} Keima debates with her about research and reality, but she then thinks of him as a lost puppy.^{[ch. 112]} Keima continues to talk with her about perfection and love, and eventually she responds that she finds his conversations interesting, and after a kiss, she disappears.^{[ch. 113]} She discusses with Nikaidō-sensei about the events. Her actual name is Rimyuel (リミュエル, Rimyueru), and she has been working with her on using a fake Loose Spirit signal as a lure.^{[ch. 109]}

Wakaki developed Akari's story as an example of "mutual agreement through discussion" and considered Akari to be the same type as Keima as she is "smart, eccentric, and intent on pursuing her ideals." He also uses Akari to show how Keima has changed over time because of his interaction with the real girls.^{[vol. 13:extras]}

==== Urara Shiratori ====
Urara Shiratori (白鳥 麗, Shiratori Urara) is Keima's kindergarten classmate from ten years ago.^{[ch. 204]} She tries to act like an adult by playing with make up (actually her mother's^{[ch. 219]}) and shuns childlike activities such as Keima's video games.^{[ch. 204-205]} She is the granddaughter of Shoutaro Shiratori who is in charge of a construction project at the site where the Loose Souls are to escape.^{[ch. 205]} Her desires to become an adult are realized by a Loose Soul^{[ch. 218,219]} who had possessed her mother.^{[ch. 221]}

==== Kaori Yuuzaki ====
Kaori Yuuzaki (結崎 香織, Yūzaki Kaori) is a sixth grader from Maijima East Elementary School. She was well liked among her schoolmates due to her charisma, mature attitude and helpful personality, and thus ranks number one in the popularity rankings.^{[ch. 230]} However, Keima later learns this is image is a facade, and the real Kaori is a selfish, egotistical girl who looks down on everyone. She makes a deal with the demons to use the popularity ranking scheme to capture girls that would be suitable for housing the Loose Souls.^{[ch. 231,233]}

=== Supernatural beings ===
Long ago, the realms of Heaven, Earth and the Underworld maintained a harmonious relationship. When a human dies on Earth, its soul would be ferried to the Underworld, some of its energy would be shared among the realms, and the soul would be placed in a new human body.^{[ch. 80]} Some of the Underworld demons became greedy for energy; these Old Hell demons filled humans with wickedness, and conspired to take over both Heaven and Earth. Other demons were against the idea, and about 300 years before the start of the series, they allied with the forces of Heaven to seal away the Old Hell demons.^{[ch. 80]} The New Hell regime took over the Underworld and introduced many changes in demon society, including democracy, ending barbarism and an energy efficient society. However, ten years ago, runaway spirits, called Loose Souls or Weiss, escaped from the Underworld and came to Earth. In order to stop the Weiss from possessing human girls, the Spirit Hunter squads were created to capture them. Yet unknown to most New Hell demons, the Weiss are in fact the souls of the Old Hell demons who are using their hosts in order to be reincarnated within their children.

==== Spirit Hunter Squad ====
The Spirit Hunter Squad consists of Spirit Hunters, who are demons, and their partners, who are humans. Their objective is to capture the Loose Spirits. The partners are apparently not chosen by the Spirit Hunter.^{[ch. 48]}

===== Dokuro Skull =====
Voiced by: Kujira (Japanese); Samuel Roman (Seasons 1-2), Mark X. Laskowski (Season 3) (English)

Dokuro Skull (ドクロウ・スカール, Dokurō Sukāru) (Note: Dokuro ドクロ translates to "skull") is the Section Chief of Counter Measures of the Far East branch, and a former heroine, who in her fights for the New Demons, loses her flesh,^{[ch. 201]} and appears mainly as a short, skeletal figure in a black cloak.^{[ch. 1]} The boss of Elsie, Haqua, and Nora, she is the one who assigned their human partners. Although the rival organization Vintage has taken much of the power in New Hell, she still believes the future belongs to the New Demons like Haqua.^{[ch. 161]}

She becomes a central character in the storyline following the revival of the Jupiter sisters. After being framed and killed for being the leader of Vintage,^{[ch. 192-193]} she leaves a sphere for Nora so that Keima can travel to the past.^{[ch. 193]} As a teenage girl incarnation in the past timeline,^{[ch. 203,216]} she helps Keima choose events to ensure Keima's present timeline will happen, and resets the scenario if he fails.^{[ch. 201,216]} In her human form, when she is weak or dying, she regresses in age to a baby which causes the scenario to "fail",^{[ch. 198]} but is restored when Keima kisses her.^{[ch. 200-201]} As Keima tries to complete his mission in his past, it is revealed that the teenage incarnation has grown up to be Keima's teacher Yuri Nikaidō.^{[ch. 250,254]}

===== Yukie Marui =====
Voiced by: Yoko Gibu (Japanese); Cara Duncan (English)

Yukie Marui (丸井 雪絵, Marui Yukie)^{[vol. 6:omake]} is a plump 54-year-old saleswoman with an afro, dotted eyes and big cheeks who is the human partner of Haqua. She sells Gokult (a parody of Yakult) by making deliveries and by going door-to-door around the neighborhood. Although she started partnering with Haqua around the same time Keima did with Elsie, (Note: In chapter 48, Keima meets Spirit Hunter partner Yukie Marui, who has also been working in that capacity for three months.^{[ch. 48]}) Yukie has located fifteen Loose Spirits in her area, but has only captured one, thus Haqua thinks Yukie is useless since she only just visits people daily for months and nothing more.^{[ch. 48]} However, Keima explains that Yukie's method is working, albeit slowly, as she tries to get to know each girl; she frees a Loose Spirit from a shut-in girl who helped Yukie when she tripped. Haqua then captures four Loose Spirits within the next week.^{[ch. 49]} Yukie also treats Haqua like her daughter by teaching her how to cook human food.^{[ch. 125]}

===== Nora =====
Voiced by: Megumi Toyoguchi (Japanese); Maggie Flecknoe (English)

Nora Floriann Leoria (ノーラ・フロリアン・レオリア, Nōra Furorian Reoria)^{[vol. 7:omake]} is a Spirit Hunter who is introduced during their biannual assembly; she is ten years older than Elsie and Haqua.^{[ch. 56]} She is arrogant and disdainful; she looks down on younger demons.^{[ch. 56]} Although she has a human partner, Ryo Asama^{[ch. 59]}, she sometimes tries to force Loose Spirits out without his help. Her preferred method of capturing Loose Spirits is to fulfill the target's desire: (e.g. riches for those who want money, suitable partners for those who desire love, death to her enemies for those who desire revenge).^{[ch. 59]} Due to her impulsive nature, she sometimes assumes the target's strong emotion to be hate instead of love,^{[ch. 59]} and attacks the target's person of affection; in Tenri's case, she fights Keima.^{[ch. 60]}

After some personnel changes, Nora is promoted to District Chief and serves as Elsie's superior.^{[ch. 74]} Despite looking down on them, Nora does care about her colleagues and refrains from killing them outright.^{[ch. ??]} She later joins Keima's quest to find and protect the Jupiter Sisters after she is given an incentive that she will receive all the credit for doing so.^{[ch. 131]} It is shown that she is quite shrewd with a keen intuition when she manages to trap Fiore after Haqua released her, knowing what both of them would do.^{[ch. 134]} Most recently, Nora has decided to join Vintage to act as a double agent to protect the goddesses;^{[ch. 151]} she sends Ryo to help Keima.^{[ch. 152]} Following the events concerning the reunion of the Jupiter Sisters and the disbandment of Vintage, Nora is promoted to Head District Chief.^{[ch. 191]}

===== Ryo Asama =====
Voiced by: Takuma Terashima (Japanese); Blake Shepard (English)

Ryō Asama (浅間 亮, Asama Ryō) is Nora's human partner. A good-looking 18-year-old guy who attends a private high school, Ryō acts like Casanova as he typically carries flowers and tries to charm girls.^{[ch. 59,60]} In reality, he forgets his lines and has to use a crib sheet.^{[ch. 59]} He has horrible writing; in the Tenri storyline, he signs a letter Bald (禿, hage) instead of his name Ryō (亮).^{[ch. 60]} On another occasion, he cannot even differentiate his left hand from his right hand, so he writes the words "left" and "right" on his hands to remind himself.^{[ch. 152]} It is because of these faults that Nora sees Ryō as useless and will beat him whenever he fails her or annoys her. While Nora acts as a double agent with Vintage, Ryo helps Keima a little with finding the last Jupiter Sister.^{[ch. 152,153]}

===== Shalia =====
Shalia Frey Amon (シャリア・フレイ・アモン, Sharia Furei Amon), also known as Shali (シャリィ, Sharī), was Elsie's supervisor and the District Chief of Area 30-2 before being transferred to become the District Chief of Area 30–4.^{[ch. 73,98]} Later, Shalia admits to Nora that she was the one who reported Haqua to the Public Security Force as she was suspicious of Haqua's behavior and Vintage had threatened her.^{[ch. 161]}

===== Fiore =====
Fiore Loderia Lavigneri (フィオーレ, Fiōre) is a Spirit Hunter, introduced as a former classmate of Haqua and Elsie.^{[ch. 129]} (Note: Fiore also ranked second in the graduating class, behind Haqua.^{[ch. 129]}) She is secretly a member of Vintage, an organization of New Hell era demons who intend to bring the era of Old Hell back to the Underworld.^{[ch. 116]} She initially appears as a figure who reports that Yui Goido's Loose Soul became a strong Level 4, and it was only a matter of time before a fully revived Weiss would manifest.^{[ch. 89]} After she disguises herself as Kusunoki Kasuga to manipulate Hinoki and make Hinoki's Loose Soul more powerful, Fiore is then shown as a Spirit Hunter with glasses.^{[ch. 97]} But she is shocked when the spirit is defeated and captured.^{[ch. 101]}

She returns to hunt down the Jupiter Sisters. By using a modified spirit sensor, she manages to find Apollo hidden inside of Kanon Nakagawa and stabs her with an enchanted dagger.^{[ch. 116]} She transfers to Nora's district,^{[ch. 129]} and, along with Nora, visits Keima, where she attempts to recover her modified spirit sensor, but is caught in Keima's trap.^{[ch. 130]} She manages to convince Haqua to release her despite Keima's instructions not to.^{[ch. 134]} She then traps Haqua and Nora in a spirit catcher bottle and creates magical doppelgängers of them to take over their districts for Vintage.^{[ch. 135]} When Keima returns, she traps him as well but Keima tricks her into exposing Vintage's goals and the true purpose of the Spirit Hunter Squad. Unknown to her and her minions, Tsukiyo, who Keima earlier discovered was host to the Goddess Vulcan, was secretly listening to the conversation.^{[ch. 136,137]} Vulcan, angered by the revelations, decides to make Fiore and her minions suffer her wrath.^{[ch. 137]} Currently, Fiore is held captive by Keima in his home.^{[ch. 137]}

===== Lune =====
Voiced by: Haruka Tomatsu (Japanese); Tiffany Grant (English)

Lune (リューネ, Ryūne) is an executive Vintage agent who has infiltrated the Spirit Hunters; she oversees other fellow Vintage agents. She is a very moody person as she can easily switch from quiet to happy to angry. She despises humans but is not allowed to harm them, so she instead scares them by stabbing her own hand which she seems to enjoy doing.^{[ch. 152]} Vintage has Lune take over Haqua's position as District Chief of Area 32 during Haqua's arrest.^{[ch. 161]} In the anime, she is the one who stabs Apollo instead of Fiore.

=== Jupiter Sisters ===
The Jupiter Sisters (left to right): Mercury, Minerva, Mars, Diana, Apollo, and Vulcan.

About 300 years before the start of the series, the six daughters of the god-king Jupiter sacrificed themselves to seal the Old Demons in the Underworld.^{[ch. 80]} Ten years before the series, the seal is broken; the Old Demons, known as Loose Souls or Weiss, escape to Earth.^{[ch. 65]} The Sisters are also freed but are in a weakened state because they used their power for the sealing.^{[ch. 80]} They take residence in the hearts of girls and can co-exist with the Weiss, but unlike the Weiss, who feed on negative emotions, the Sisters feed on love.^{[ch. 65,81]} One of the key indicators that a girl is hosting a Sister is that she remembers her relationship with Keima even after she is freed of the Loose Soul.^{[ch. 80,81]}

The Sisters communicate with other humans by possessing their host (indicated by a halo over her head),^{[ch. 65]} or by speaking from a reflective surface.^{[ch. 65]} They can also manifest themselves outside the host when strong enough.^{[ch. 80]} When a Sister's powers are restored, she can manifest wings.^{[ch. 135]}

Diana employs Keima to find her Sisters.^{[ch. 80,81]} After Vintage's plans are foiled, the Sisters continue to cause trouble for Keima as they plot for their hosts to continue to pursue Keima, and poke fun that Diana herself has fallen for him too.^{[ch. 190]}

==== Diana ====
Voiced by: Kaori Nazuka (Japanese); Juliet Simmons (English)

Based on the Roman goddess of "the hunt and the moon", Diana (ディアナ, Diana) is the third-born sister who resides in the body of Tenri Ayukawa and the first of the Sisters to be introduced in the series. At first, Keima believed her to be a Loose Spirit, but Tenri explains that Diana saved them both ten years ago from the Weiss.^{[ch. 62-64]} Keima visits her when he wants to know more about the relationship between Heaven and the Underworld.^{[ch. 65]} When Diana takes over Tenri's body, she appears with slanted eyes in contrast to Tenri's rounded eyes. Diana acts cold, selfish, and thoughtless most of the time which tends to irk some people, yet she is very supportive of Tenri's love for Keima. She wishes for Tenri and Keima to be a couple as it would restore her powers, although she is disgusted that Keima has made other girls fall in love with him. Diana asks Keima to find her sisters,^{[ch. 80]} in exchange, the Sisters can seal the Weiss again, and that would free Keima from the contract.^{[ch. 81]} Later on in the series, after Keima apologizes to her for his indecisiveness, Diana regains more of her powers and now can use her wings.^{[ch. 139]} Even though her wings grew, she did not notice it and feels that the reason her wings didn't grow is that she too, has feelings for Keima.^{[ch. 139,158]} Feeling bad for Tenri, she tries to push Tenri with Keima even more.^{[ch. 167,168]}

==== Apollo ====
Voiced by: Nao Toyama (Japanese); Brittney Karbowski (English)

Based on the Greek and Roman god of "music, poetry and the arts", Apollo (アポロ, Aporo) is the second-born sister who resides in the body of Kanon Nakagawa. Unlike Diana, Apollo admits she is an idiot, and that she does not remember much except that she and her sisters previously sealed the Weiss. She regains some of her powers because of Kanon's songs that are filled with love and appear to Kanon after her encounter with Keima. When she takes over Kanon, she exhibits markings on her face. Like her sister, she wants her host and Keima to become a couple.^{[ch. 114]}

After sensing that she is being targeted, Kanon confesses to Keima in the middle of the exam but Apollo takes over and makes her retreat.^{[ch. 115,116]} However, Fiore of Vintage arrives and stabs her with a dagger, enchanted with the dark magic of Old Hell.^{[ch. 116]} She sends a message into the sky to warn her sisters to trust no one and tries to fight off the curse that leaves Kanon comatose and possibly dead in a week.^{[ch. 118]} Diana and Vulcan combine their efforts and remove the dagger, but Kanon remains in a suspended state because Apollo cast a protection spell on herself and submerged her consciousness in the process.^{[ch. 138]} After Keima manages to contact her and Kanon within a dream world thanks to four of the Jupiter Sisters, she warns him of an upcoming danger in the future.^{[ch. 158-160]}

==== Vulcan ====
Voiced by: Yuka Iguchi (Japanese); Caitlynn French (English)

Named after the Roman god of fire, Vulcan (ウルカヌス, Urukanusu) is the self-proclaimed goddess of "love and justice", ^{[ch. 133]} she is the first-born sister who resides in the body of Tsukiyo Kujyō, though more often personified in the form of her doll, Luna.^{[ch. 133]} Unlike her sisters, Vulcan has bad eyesight and hearing, and can not walk, but can instead possess an object. When Vulcan takes over Tsukiyo's body, her hair becomes darker.^{[ch. 133]}

Vulcan appears at the library by possessing Luna. She is upset that Keima is wooing Shori Shiomiya and had wooed Kanon Nakagawa, even though he shows interest in Tsukiyo again.^{[ch. 133]} Luna attacks Keima, and warns him not to come near Tsukiyo.^{[ch. 131]} Despite this, Keima still manages to evade her attacks and confronts Tsukiyo herself, who chooses to believe in his sincerity.^{[ch. 134]} This causes Vulcan to reluctantly cease her attacks, and after Tsukiyo kisses Keima on the cheek, Vulcan manifests a pair of wings.^{[ch. 135]} Keima takes her to his house where Luna observes Fiore, who reveals Vintage's plan of using the Spirit Hunters to capture the sisters.^{[ch. 136]} She easily defeats Fiore and her doppelgänger minions.^{[ch. 137]} With Diana's help, she removes the dagger and curse on Apollo/Kanon, leaving just Apollo's self-preservation spell.^{[ch. 138]}

==== Mars ====
Voiced by: Ayahi Takagaki (Japanese); Krystal LaPorte (English)

Named after the Roman god of war, Mars (マルス, Marusu) is the fourth-born sister who resides in the body of Yui Goidō. When Mars takes over Yui's body, her hair becomes lighter, tied into a braid while wearing a ringed headband. She awakens after Yui and Keima agree to go on a date at an amusement park.^{[ch. 141]} As a goddess of war, she is very cautious about going into any new situation and always suggests that Yui bring a weapon with her as a safety precaution.^{[ch. 142]} Mars is just a little confused by Yui and Keima's cross-dressing and at first, mistakes them for a boy and girl respectively, but while she has only just got to know Yui recently, Mars fully supports Yui's love for Keima.^{[ch. 142]} After saving Keima from a Vintage assassin (actually Haqua in disguise) who threatens Keima, Yui, and Keima kiss, and Mars manifests her wings.^{[ch. 143]}

==== Minerva ====
Voiced by: Kana Hanazawa (Japanese); Hilary Haag (English)

Based on the goddess of wisdom and poetry, Minerva (ミネルヴァ, Mineruva) is the fifth-born sister. With Shiori Shiomiya as her host, Minerva first appears in the library in the form of a young girl who looks similar to Shiori. She holds a book in her hand but shyly looks at Shiori from behind a bookshelf.^{[ch. 145]} As Keima repairs his relationship with Shiori by helping her write a story for the school festival, Minerva secretly helps her as well. When Keima finishes reading her story, while Shiori is sleeping, Minerva takes over her body and meets Keima for the first time. But because of Apollo's warnings, she is unwilling to talk to him. Nevertheless, after his relationship with Shiori improves, Keima kisses her on the cheek, which restores Minerva's powers including her wings, after which Minerva properly introduces herself to Shiori.^{[ch. 145-150]} After the sisters reunite, Minerva tries to prevent her older sisters from claiming Keima, as she believes he belongs to Shiori.^{[ch. 190]}

==== Mercury ====
Voiced by: Ayana Taketatsu (Japanese); Elizabeth Bunch (English)

Based on the Roman god of trade, Mercury (メリクリウス, Merikuriusu) is the sixth and final sister to be introduced and her host was revealed to be Ayumi Takahara.^{[ch. 165]} She is known to know exotic spells and throughout the Goddess arc, her sisters kept commenting that she may be able to break Apollo's hydration spell.^{[ch. ??]} Whenever Mercury takes over her host, her skin becomes darker and her hair turns lighter with bangs covering her left eye. She also has two small face marks underneath her eye.^{[ch. 165]} Her personality is the opposite of Ayumi—She has a detached personality while Ayumi has a caring personality. She seems to find human behavior interesting.^{[ch. 173]} Like the other goddesses, she cares very much about her host but unlike them, she's not afraid to tell Ayumi what's on her mind and even criticizes her like when Ayumi followed Keima and saw him dump Chihiro, with Mercury saying "you reap what you sow", and is often seen sleeping.^{[ch. 167]}

=== Other characters ===
==== Mari Katsuragi ====
Voiced by: Ryōka Yuzuki (Japanese); Shelley Calene-Black (English)

Mari Katsuragi (桂木 麻里, Katsuragi Mari) is introduced as Keima's mother, the owner of "Cafe Grandpa". At first she appears to be cheerful and loving, but after Elsie reveals she is the illegitimate daughter of her husband, Mari reveals her violent personality, having been a member of a biker gang. Despite these events, she treats Elsie lovingly as her child and worries about Keima's future.^{[ch. 2]} She rides a Ducati 1098 which she still maintains at home.^{[ch. ??]}

==== Yuri Nikaidō ====
Voiced by: Atsuko Tanaka (Japanese); Elizabeth Bunch (Season 1), Maggie Flecknoe (Seasons 2-3) (English)

Yuri Nikaidō (二階堂 由梨, Nikaidō Yuri) (Note: angelfrench [@angelfrench] (October 29, 2010). "秘密じゃないですよ。二階堂由梨です。これ実は1話が始" (Tweet) – via Twitter.(in Japanese)) is Keima's 22-year-old homeroom and Japanese language teacher. Many students fear her, as she has no qualms about beating her students if they don't pay attention in class, although Keima does not seem to mind.^{[ch. 1]} She was Jun Nagase's senior in Maijima High; they were both on the basketball team.^{[ch. 38]}

When Hinoki Kasuga's Loose Soul becomes too powerful for the Spirit Hunters to capture, Nikaidō secretly helps them by singlehandedly capturing it in a special containment jar. She laments that New Hell's demons are weak, but also puts away her skull badge to get back to a teacher conference.^{[ch. 101]} She is also in cahoots with Akari Kurakawa, where they had devised a fake Loose Soul signal to lure their enemies out.^{[ch. 113]} In the storyline where Keima travels back in time, it is revealed that she is the incarnation of Dokuro Skull.^{[ch. 250,254]}

She is named after Nikaidō Station in Tenri, Nara.

==== Ichiro Kodama ====
Voiced by: Ryūsei Nakao (Japanese); Chris Ayres (Seasons 1-2), David Wald (Season 3) (English)

Ichirō Kodama (児玉 一郎, Kodama Ichirō) (Note: angelfrench [@angelfrench] (October 28, 2010). "あれ、今キャラ表みたら、児玉先生にも下の名前あった。" (Tweet) – via Twitter.(in Japanese)) is Maijima High's English teacher^{[ch. 11,12]} and the advisor for the Arts clubs.^{[ch. 54]} Kodama is a strict teacher like Nikaidō, except that he exaggerates his speech when he speaks English. Kodama views Keima as a delinquent because of his gaming habits, but cannot punish him because he still gets the top scores in his class.^{[ch. 11,12]}

==== Miyako Terada ====
Voiced by: Nozomi Chikamura (Japanese); Nancy Novotny (English)

Miyako Terada (寺田 京, Terada Miyako) is a 17-year-old Maijima High School Academy student in Keima's class with long hair and freckles on her cheeks. She is introduced as the keyboard player for Chihiro's band, 2B Pencils. She attends cram school.^{[ch. 54]} She is also on the track team with Ayumi.^{[ch. 107]}

==== Fujidera ====
Voiced by: Ai Nonaka (Japanese); Monica Rial (Uncredited, Season 1), Allison Sumrall (Season 3) (English)

Fujidera (藤井寺, Fujidera) is a girl who ties her hair to two long braids and wear Hexagonal glasses. She is the committee chairman of the Majima Academy Library Committee with Shiori Shiomiya. Her personality is aggressive and straight forward (as can be seen when she talks with Shiori about the library changes and the deadline of Shiori's novel.) Wakaki never officially announced her full name and is only known as Fujidera.

==== Hiroko Matsumiya ====
Voiced by: Mayuki Makiguchi

Hiroko Matsumiya (松宮 宏子, Matsumiya Hiroko) is a short-haired girl with glasses attending Maijima High. Nicknamed "Mappy", she is a character from the manga "Holy Crystal Albatross", a previous work of Tamiki Wakaki. Her nickname is derived from Mappy.

==== Morita ====
Voiced by: Shōto Kashii (Japanese); Kalob Martinez (English)

Morita (森田) (Note: angelfrench [@angelfrench] (October 28, 2010). "これは本当にないね。森田は昔ボツったマンガのなかで岸" (Tweet) – via Twitter.(in Japanese)) is Mio Aoyama's chauffeur. He used to work for Mio's father before he died and stayed to serve Mio as an act of loyalty to his late boss.^{[ch. 3]} However, he leaves her after the prideful Mio refuses to stop living a lie that she is still rich^{[ch. 3]} but later returns after Mio has accepted her family situation.^{[vol. 1:omake]} He is modeled after late actor Shin Kishida.

==== Hiyori Sakurai ====
Hiyori Sakurai (桜井 ひより, Sakurai Hiyori) is a 17-year-old Maijima High School student and a member of the swimming club.^{[ch. 50]} She appears in the 2008 issue 38, Weekly Shōnen Sunday extra sugoroku game, Kami nomi zo Shiru Sekai -A One Summer Experience-

Lime

Voiced by: Rina Hidaka (Japanese); Serena Varghese (English)

Lime (らいむ Raimu) is the former leader of Citron and an old friend of Kanon. Her actual name is unknown, for "Lime" is more-likely her stage name.

Yuri

Voiced by: Maaya Uchida (Japanese); Monica Rial (English)

Yuri (ゆり Yuri) is the former member of Citron and an old friend of Kanon. Her actual name is unknown, for "Yuri" is more-likely her stage name.

==== Mobuko Ikarino ====
Voiced by: Yuko Gibu

Mobuko Ikarino (怒野 モブ子, Ikarino Mobuko) is a background character. In his blog, Wakaki stated that he has not decided on the character's name yet, and calls her Ikarino Mobuko. Although she was seen distributing fliers or doing chores for class in school's seasonal events, she is not actually the class rep or secretary, she is doing it because it's her day assignment that day. Probability of her becoming capture target is 0%. Ikarino is derived from Dōkyūsei 2's Ikarino Botsuko, a rejected heroine character who downgraded into support character, while Mobuko is derived from mob, as mob character.

== Original characters ==
=== Game characters ===
==== Sora Asuka ====
Voiced by: Tomo Sakurai (Japanese); Melissa Davis (English)

Sora Asuka (飛鳥 空, Asuka Sora) is the heroine of the PFP game Crayon – Sora no Art. The game has a large number of bugs, and lacked technical support, so no one has ever been able to see the ending. Keima decides to play through her storyline no matter what, as she cannot be blamed that the game is no good. After numerous tries, he eventually reaches the end of the game, only to see the final picture corrupted in static.^{[ch. 17]}

==== Yotsuba Sugimoto ====
Voiced by: Sakura Tange (Japanese); Hilary Haag (English)

Yotsuba Sugimoto (杉本 四葉, Sugimoto Yotsuba), nicknamed Yokkyun, is Keima's favorite game girl, despite being poorly drawn, which Keima says is not her fault.^{[ch. 43]} The final episode of the second season anime devotes much focus on their "relationship". In the Tenri storyline, Nora discovers she is Keima's most precious person so she destroys the image, however, this causes Keima to go berserk and attack Nora.^{[ch. 60]}

=== Novel characters ===
The following characters appear in the light novels.

==== Tooru Amami ====
Tooru Amami (天美 透, Amami Tōru) is a girl who cosplayed as an angel who rescued Keima from fire in a cafe. Her speech and conduct is the so-called day-dreamer (電波系, denpakei) (which Keima categorized as flower field-type (お花畑タイプ, ohanabatake-type)), going around stores' neon signs calling it "Star Pilgrim Quest", searching for "Eternal Plus" and saying other incomprehensible things. Has a nice body style and sharp intuition. Sometimes shows a cold expression.

Born in a rich family, she received a strict management education and special education at home and goes to a special school for the riches. She almost has no time for herself and her parents prohibit her hobby for picture book. Her family policy imposes a subtraction system called "Minus Check", every time she does something that considered not good she will get subtraction, and after reaching some point she will be punished. Oppressed by the constrained life, she imagines a fiction world inside her head and often make an eccentric actions.

==== Asami Yoshino ====
Voiced by: Youko Hikasa (Japanese)

Asami Yoshino (吉野 麻美, Yoshino Asami) is a 17-year-old Majima Academy student and Keima's classmate. A quiet girl, in the class she usually reading alone and does not actively interact with other. From the start, she already have an interest on Keima and always looking at him.

Different with her sister, she is not good socializing with people, to fix it she joins tea ceremony club and always participates in the class activity. But it doesn't go well and talking with others too much makes her want to puke. She can talk normally with her family.

==== Ikumi Yoshino ====
Ikumi Yoshino (吉野 郁美, Yoshino Ikumi) is Asami's twin sister who goes to a different high school. Opposites with her sister, sociable and really active. Approaches Keima while pretending as Asami to know more about him because Asami shows interest on Keima.

==== Shino Akuragawa ====
Shino Akuragawa (阿倉川 紫埜, Akuragawa Shino) is a miko from Toyoboshi-jinja, Mt. Uryu. In her middle twenties, she has a mature beauty although she does not really take concern about it. Talks exaggeratedly like a samurai. Dignified and diligent, easy to hang out with and cares for others. She also handles domestic chores flawlessly, but in the other side she is a klutz. Has mysterious ability to create barrier etc. In pursuit of Akuoni (あくおに) that released by Mogami in the past. Mogami was a gal game programmer, scenario writer and artist who renowned for the horror games. To make an ultimate horror game, he released Akuoni from Toyoboshi-jinja and accomplished on inserting it to the last game he made, Saiontourou (西恩灯籠).

==== Aoba Fuse ====
Aoba Fuse (風瀬 青羽, Fuse Aoba) is a 17-year-old genius from Maijima High School student. Has no interest on anything, even herself. Almost never show any emotion. Has a great talent that if she wants to, she can get excellent grades for everything, whether it's sport or science. Even Keima acknowledged her as a genius. But, because of her talent, there is nothing that truly interest her and thus creates a gap in her heart.

After she is captured by Keima, from the sequent of events, she becomes addicted to gal games and becomes famous in gal game world as "Mai(jima) Princess (舞姫, Maihime)".

== See also ==
- List of The World God Only Knows chapters
