= Serena Varghese =

American voice actress (born 1981)

- Born: October 10, 1981 (age 44); Houston, Texas, U.S.
- Other name: Serena Gonzalez
- Occupation: Voice actress
- Spouse: Jorge Alberto Gonzalez
- Children: 1

Serena Varghese (born October 10, 1981) is an American voice actress of Indian descent. She is best known as the voice of Chihiro Kosaka and Lime from The World God Only Knows, Mei Sunohara from the Clannad series, Michiru from Air, Hinako from Sister Princess, Kamyuu from the Utawarerumono series, Yun Yun from Canaan, Rein Tsunomoto from Best Student Council, and Minato Kisaragi from Dream Eater Merry. In 2007, she was one of the hosts of the American Anime Awards presentation ceremony in New York Comic Con.

== Biography ==
Serena and her husband Jorge Alberto Gonzalez live in Los Angeles, California.

== Filmography ==
=== Anime ===
Year	Title	Role	Notes	Source
2004	Sister Princess	Hinako		
2007	Air	Michiru	also season 2 and OVA	
2007	Best Student Council	Rein Tsumomoto		
2007	Utawareumono	Kamyuu	also season 2 and OVA	
2008	5 Centimeters Per Second	Kanae Sumida	original ADV Films dub	
2010	Canaan	Yun Yun		
2011	Clannad	Mei Sunohara	also season 2	
2012	Dream Eater Merry	Minato Kisaragi		
2012	The World God Only Knows	Chihiro Kosaka, Lime		
2015- 2020	Is It Wrong to Try to Pick Up Girls in a Dungeon?	Asfi Al Andromeda	Also seasons 2, 3, and Sword Oratoria	
