= Manglobe =

Japanese animation studio

Manglobe Inc.
- Native name: 株式会社マングーブ
- Romanized name: Kabushiki-gaisha Mangurōbu
- Type: Kabushiki gaisha
- Industry: Japanese animation
- Founded: February 7, 2002; 24 years ago
- Founder: Shinichirō Kobayashi; Takashi Kochiyama
- Defunct: September 29, 2015; 11 years ago
- Successor: Geno Studio
- Headquarters: Suginami, Tokyo, Japan
- Key people: Shinichirō Kobayashi (President & CEO)

Manglobe Inc. (Japanese: 株式会社マングローブ, Hepburn: Kabushiki-gaisha Mangurōbu) was a Japanese animation studio based in Suginami, Tokyo and formed on February 7, 2002, by Sunrise producers Shinichirō Kobayashi and Takashi Kochiyama. Manglobe filed for bankruptcy in September 2015, having accumulated an estimated debt of ¥350 million.

== Studio production ==
Manglobe made its name producing original shows such as Samurai Champloo and Ergo Proxy, rather than adaptations of existing works. Since 2010, the studio had been responsible for multiple seasons of the anime adaptation of The World God Only Knows. Writer of The World God Only Knows manga Tamiki Wakaki became good friends with Manglobe's managing director Takashi Kochiyama during this period, and had stated that working closely with Manglobe's staff resulted in "a truly fortunate work."

== Bankruptcy ==
On September 29, 2015, the studio filed for bankruptcy and removed its website. The Anime! Anime! Biz website reported that the studio had been insolvent for some time, and it had considered options such as debt consolidation before deciding to file for bankruptcy. According to a report by Teikoku Databank, Manglobe had an estimated debt of 350 million yen. Manglobe's bankruptcy resulted in a delay of the theatrical release of the film Genocidal Organ, which had been slated to open on November 13, 2015, and a 16-month long delay of the home video release of Gangsta from Volume 3 onwards in Japan.

== Works ==
=== TV series ===
Title	Director	Episodes	Airdate
Samurai Champloo	Shinichirō Watanabe	26	May 20, 2004 – March 19, 2005
Ergo Proxy	Shūkō Murase	23	February 25, 2006 – August 12, 2006
Michiko & Hatchin	Sayo Yamamoto	22	October 15, 2008 – March 18, 2009
The Sacred Blacksmith	Masamitsu Hidaka	12	October 3, 2009 – December 19, 2009
House of Five Leaves	Tomomi Mochizuki	12	April 15, 2010 – July 1, 2010
The World God Only Knows	Shigehito Takayanagi	12	October 6, 2010 – December 22, 2010
Deadman Wonderland	Kōichirō Hatsumi	12	April 17, 2011 – July 3, 2011
The World God Only Knows II	Shigehito Takayanagi	12	April 12, 2011 – June 28, 2011
Mashiroiro Symphony	Eiji Suganuma	12	October 5, 2011 – December 21, 2011
Hayate the Combat Butler: Can't Take My Eyes Off You	Masashi Kudō	12	October 4, 2012 – December 20, 2012
Unlimited Psychic Squad	Shishō Igarashi	12	January 7, 2013 – March 25, 2013
Karneval	Eiji Suganuma	13	April 3, 2013 – June 26, 2013
Hayate the Combat Butler: Cuties	Masashi Kudō	12	April 8, 2013 – July 1, 2013
The World God Only Knows: Goddesses	Satoshi Ōsedo	12	July 8, 2013 – September 23, 2013
Samurai Flamenco	Takahiro Omori	22	October 10, 2013 – March 27, 2014
Gangsta	Shūkō Murase; Kōichi Hatsumi	12	July 1, 2015 – September 27, 2015

=== Others ===
- Trip Trek (ONA, 2003)
- Sengoku BASARA (Game – Cut scenes, 2005)
- Dante's Inferno: An Animated Epic (Film – Segment "Limbo", 2010)
- Hayate the Combat Butler: Heaven is a Place on Earth (Film, 2011)
- Shinken Zemi Kōkō Kōza (OVA, 2012)
- Genocidal Organ (Film, 2017; production taken over by Geno Studio after bankruptcy)
