= Tamiki Wakaki =

Japanese manga artist

- Born: 若木 民喜; May 9, 1972 (age 54) Ikeda, Japan
- Area: Manga artist
- Notable works: The World God Only Knows

Tamiki Wakaki (若木 民喜, Wakaki Tamiki; born May 9, 1972) is a Japanese manga artist, notable for his manga series, The World God Only Knows.

== Works ==
Title	Year	Notes	Refs
Holy Crystal Albatross (ja:聖結晶アルバトロス, Seikesshō Arubatorosu)	2006	Serialized in Weekly Shōnen Sunday; Published by Shogakukan in 5 volumes	
The World God Only Knows	2008–14	Serialized in Weekly Shōnen Sunday; Published by Shogakukan in 26 volumes	
Nanoha Yōgashiten no Ii Shigoto (なのは洋菓子店のいい仕事; also Le travail de qualité de la pâtisserie Nanoha; A Great Job at Nanoha Western Sweets Shop)	2015–16	Serialized in Weekly Shōnen Sunday; Published in 7 volumes	
Neji no hitobito (ねじの人々; "The Screw People")	2015–16	Serialized in Shogakukan's Ura Sunday website Published in 3 volumes	
16bit Sensation	2016–present	Self-published doujinshi, later compiled and published by Kadokawa Shoten in 2020; Published in 7 doujinshi volumes / 2 tankōbon volumes (ongoing)	
King of Idol (キング・オブ・アイドル)	2017–18	Serialized in Weekly Shōnen Sunday; Published in 6 volumes	
365 Days to the Wedding (結婚するって、本当ですか, Kekkon Surutte, Hontō desu ka)	2020–2023	Serialized in Big Comic Spirits; Published in 11 volumes	
Yoshida Lemon Drops (ヨシダ檸檬ドロップス)	Aug 5, 2024–present	Serialized in Big Comic Spirits	

== Other works ==
Wakaki collaborated on Team Ninja's Dead or Alive 5 Last Round to create some original costume designs for its characters.
