= The World God Only Knows =

Japanese manga series

- First tankōbon volume cover, featuring Keima Katsuragi

神のみぞ知るセカイ (Kami Nomi zo Shiru Sekai)
- Genre: Harem; Romantic comedy; Supernatural
- Manga
- Written by: Tamiki Wakaki
- Published by: Shogakukan
- Imprint: Shōnen Sunday Comics
- Magazine: Weekly Shōnen Sunday
- Original run: April 9, 2008 – April 23, 2014
- Volumes: 26
- Light novel
- Written by: Mamizu Arisawa
- Illustrated by: Tamiki Wakaki
- Published by: Shogakukan
- Imprint: Gagaga Bunko
- Published: May 19, 2009
- Anime television series
- Directed by: Masato Takayanagi (S1–2); Satoshi Ōsedo (S3)
- Written by: Hideyuki Kurata
- Music by: Hayato Matsuo
- Studio: Manglobe
- Licensed by: AUS: Madman Entertainment; NA: Sentai Filmworks; UK: Manga Entertainment; US: Crunchyroll
- Original network: TV Tokyo, TVO, TSC, TVQ, TVh, TV Aichi
- English network: SEA: Animax Asia
- Original run: October 6, 2010 – September 23, 2013
- Episodes: 36
- icon

The World God Only Knows (Japanese: 神のみぞ知るセカイ, Hepburn: Kami Nomi zo Shiru Sekai), abbreviated as Kaminomi (神のみ), (Note: As seen in Weekly Shōnen Sunday. The author also acknowledged Kamishiru (神しる), Misoshiru (みそしる), Kamiseka (神セカ) as alternative abbreviation.) is a Japanese manga series written and illustrated by Tamiki Wakaki. It was originally serialized in Shogakukan's Weekly Shōnen Sunday from April 2008 to April 2014, with its chapters collected in 26 tankōbon volumes. The manga was adapted into three anime television series by Manglobe, which were broadcast in Japan from October 2010 to September 2013. In North America, the anime series were licensed for English release by Sentai Filmworks.

== Plot ==
Keima Katsuragi, a second-year high school student, is an avid player of gal games (video games that involve interactions with anime-styled pretty girls). He is known on the Internet as "The God of Conquests" (落とし神, Otoshi-gami) for his legendary skills to be able to "conquer" any 2D girl in games. However, in his actual school life, Keima is called otamega (オタメガ), a derogatory portmanteau of the two words otaku (オタク) and megane (メガネ, glasses).

At the start of the series, Keima receives an e-mail offering him a contract to "conquer" girls and, thinking it is an invitation to a game challenge, he accepts. In response, a cute demon from Hell named Elsie appears: a Spirit Hunter. She asks for his cooperation to help her in catching the evil spirits that have escaped to the Human Realm: the "Loose Souls", which were once Old Demons from Hell. These evil spirits hide themselves inside the hearts of girls, feeding off the hosts' negative emotions to replenish their power and strength, thus becoming whole demons once again (and in turn, the host becomes an empty shell of a person). Elsie suggests that the only method to force the evil spirits out is by "conquering" the girls' hearts, making them fall in love with him and filling up the gaps which the escaped evil spirits hide in, in which she is then able to capture them. Interested only in video game girls, however, Keima is appalled by the idea, and refuses the assignment as he has no romantic real life experiences whatsoever. Nevertheless, with the contract already agreed, Keima has no choice but to help Elsie no matter what, as they will be beheaded by an invisible (to others) purple collar around their necks if they fail.

After winning the hearts of fourteen girls (and capturing the spirits residing in them), Keima and Elsie are given an even greater mission: to awaken the six goddesses known as the Jupiter Sisters. Each sister is dormant in the heart of a girl among those they have previously helped, thus Keima must locate them and conquer their hearts a second time. This time however, they remember the encounters he has had with them already, due to the goddesses inside them, causing high tension and constant possible failure as he tries to conquer the girls simultaneously. However, his time is limited as a rebel demon faction called "Vintage" is planning to capture the goddesses and take over the world. After Vintage's plans are thwarted, Keima starts seeing visions of a child who is somewhat familiar to him. The goddesses send Keima and Elsie to the past with the task of helping her. Upon arriving, they team up with a mysterious girl who apparently has some connection with Dokuro, Elsie's superior in the underworld, and Keima discovers that several occurrences in the past are different from what he remembers, leading to a tragic chain of events that he must avert to ensure that the present stays unaltered, as well as another demon faction which releases giant humanoid monsters. As Keima completes his final mission, he discovers the truth about one of the giants and is able to reconcile with it. He is relieved from the collar and returns to his normal life in the real world.

== Development ==
The World God Only Knows was authored by Tamiki Wakaki. He cited the 1996 visual novel YU-NO: A Girl Who Chants Love at the Bound of this World as an influence on the manga.

== Media ==
=== Manga ===
Written and illustrated by Tamiki Wakaki, The World God Only Knows was serialized in Shogakukan's shōnen manga magazine Weekly Shōnen Sunday from April 9, 2008, to April 23, 2014. Wakaki created a prototype version of the story which debuted as a one-shot in Weekly Shōnen Sunday in 2007, titled, "Koishite!? Kami-sama!!" (恋して!? 神様!!). Shogakukan compiled its 268 chapters in twenty-six tankōbon volumes, released from July 11, 2008, to June 18, 2014.

The series is licensed in South Korea by Haksan Culture Company, and the first two volumes of the series were simultaneously released in August 2009 with a limited edition supplement for each.

A 3-chapter spin-off series, titled Magical Star Kanon 100% (マジカル☆スターかのん100%), portraying Kanon Nakagawa as a magical girl, ran in Weekly Shōnen Sunday from March 13 to March 27, 2013. The series was published along with additional chapters in a book, bundled with the limited edition of the 21st volume of the main series, released on April 16, 2013. Another spin-off series, titled Kami Nomi zo Shiru Sekai On the Train (神のみぞ知るセカイ on the train), was serialized on the Club Sunday website in 2014. It was later released into a single volume with three additional previously published chapters on July 17, 2015.

=== Light novel ===
A light novel entitled The World God Only Knows―God and the Devil and an Angel (神のみぞ知るセカイ―神と悪魔と天使, Kami nomi zo Shiru Sekai Kami to Akuma to Tenshi), written by Mamizu Arisawa and illustrated by Tamiki Wakaki, was released on May 19, 2009, published by Shogakukan under their Gagaga Bunko label. The novel features a completely original story, disparate from the series, with original novel characters. A second light novel entitled The World God Only Knows 2 Prayer and Curse and Miracle (神のみぞ知るセカイ 2 祈りと呪いとキセキ, Kami nomi zo Shiru Sekai Inori to Noroi to Kiseki) was released on May 18, 2010.

=== Anime ===
An anime television series adaptation was officially announced by Weekly Shōnen Sunday in April 2010. The series was produced by Manglobe, and directed by Masato Takayanagi, with series composition in charge of Hideyuki Kurata, character designs by Akio Watanabe, and music composed by Hayato Matsuo. Crunchyroll streamed the series. The anime aired on TV Tokyo from October 6 to December 22, 2010, with a second season airing from April 11 to June 28, 2011. The third season, titled The World God Only Knows: Goddesses (神のみぞ知るセカイ 女神篇, Kami Nomi zo Shiru Sekai: Megami-Hen), aired on TV Tokyo from July 8 to September 23, 2013, and was simulcast on Crunchyroll.

At Anime Weekend Atlanta 2011, Sentai Filmworks announced that they have licensed both seasons of the anime in North America and released the first season on DVD and Blu-ray Disc in January 2012.

=== Original video animations ===
A prologue OVA episode was released and bundled together with the tenth manga volume on September 17, 2010. A second OVA episode, titled Kami Nomi zo Shiru Sekai: 4-nin to Idol (神のみぞ知るセカイ 4人とアイドル; "The World God Only Knows: 4 Girls and an Idol"), was released on a DVD, bundled together with the fourteenth manga volume on September 16, 2011. A third OVA, titled Kami Nomi zo Shiru Sekai: Tenri-Hen (神のみぞ知るセカイ 天理篇; "The World God Only Knows: Tenri Arc"), was released in two parts with the 19th and 20th volumes of the manga, on October 16 and December 18, 2012. A spin-off OVA based on the character Kanon was announced in the 2013 combined #2–3 issue of Shogakukan's Weekly Shōnen Sunday magazine. The spin-off is titled Magical Star Kanon 100% (マジカル☆スター かのん100%) and was released bundled with the 22nd volume of the manga on June 18, 2013.

== Reception ==
The third volume of The World God Only Knows was the fourth highest-selling tankōbon in Japan on the Oricon Comic Chart for the week of January 13 and January 19, 2009, with over 50,500 copies sold that week. The following week, it was the twenty-first highest-selling manga volume in Japan, having sold 30,600 copies the week of January 20 and January 26, 2009. As of January 2009, the third manga volume have sold about 81,100 copies.

Carlo Santos of Anime News Network reviewed the anime's first season and gave it a B where he was surprised how much he enjoyed the great storyline despite its plot description alone might be off putting to some saying, "By most expectations, anything involving ditzy demon girls and gaming-obsessed geekboys and a rotating lineup of high school beauties should have been the stuff of critical derision. Yet the show's sharp sense of humor, honest emotions, and polished production values prove that working with the right prodding and poking, any anime series can indeed become greater than the sum of its parts." In a 2019 Forbes article about the best anime of the 2010s decade, Lauren Orsini considered it to be one of the five best anime of 2010; she wrote, "What makes this show a standout of its genre is Keima's individuality; he's not a viewer stand-in, but an interesting and flawed character in his own right. Sharp production values and creative character design make this show a visual and audio treat".
