= List of The World God Only Knows chapters =

The World God Only Knows (神のみぞ知るセカイ; Kami nomi zo Shiru Sekai) is a manga series written and illustrated by Tamiki Wakaki, and serialized by Shogakukan in the manga magazine Weekly Shōnen Sunday since April 9, 2008, until its finale at chapter 268. The series follows high school student Keima Katsuragi, who unknowingly accepted a contract with the Demons of Hell, and is now forced to capture escaped spirits in the city. The chapters have been compiled into 26 tankōbon volumes, published in Japan by Shogakukan. The first volume was released on July 11, 2008, and the last one on June 18, 2014. The series is licensed in South Korea by Haksan Culture Company. The first two volumes were released simultaneously in August 2009, with a limited edition supplement for each.

== Volumes list ==
No.	Japanese release date	Japanese ISBN
1	July 11, 2008	978-4-09-121430-0
001. "The World is Moving Because of Love" (世界はアイで動いてる, "Sekai wa Ai de Ugoiteru"); 002. "A Devilish Little Sister" (あくまでも妹です, "Akumade mo Imōto desu"); 003. "Baby You are a Rich Girl" (ベイビー・ユー・アー・ア・リッチ・ガール, "Beibī Yū Ā A Ritchi Gāru"); 004. "Drive My Car" (ドライヴ・マイ・カー, "Doraivu Mai Kā"); 005. "I Don't Want to Spoil the Party" (パーティーはそのままに, "Pātī wa Sonomama ni"); 006. "More Than a God, Less Than a Human" (神以上、人間未満, "Kami Ijō Ningen Miman"); Spot The Difference; Bonus Illustration; Character Profiles (with author's memo); Character 4-koma; Early Character Designs; Omake
Keima Katsuragi, a seventeen-year-old high school student of Maijima Academy known for his in-game name as "The Capturing God" due to his expertise in "capturing" girl characters in dating sims, meets a demon from New Hell named Elsie after he signed a contract sent to his PFP (a nod to PSP), which sought his gaming skills to capture runaway spirits hidden in girls' hearts by making them fall in love with him. His mission begins when Elsie detected a runaway spirit from Ayumi Takahara, his classmate and a member of the school's track team. Keima successfully purges the hidden spirit from Ayumi after he cheered for her to win the tracking event. Afterward, Elsie transfers to Keima's school posing as his sister to continue hunting runaway spirits with him. Despite his protest, Keima reluctantly accepts her as his sister for the time being until the end of his contract with her. During the lunch break, Elsie detects another runaway spirit from Mio Aoyama, an elitist high school student who addressed her schoolmates as commoners. Keima and Elsie later follow Mio on her way home and the two discover her poor status in reality. Keima begins his conquest of Mio by becoming her new chauffeur after her previous one quit. A few days later, Keima brings Mio to the high-class party held in the mansion nearby using an invitation letter he found in her mailbox. He successfully purges the runaway spirit from her after he convinced her to start to live on her own instead of pretending like a rich individual. Afterward, Keima shuts in his room and plays games he missed for the past two weeks due to recent events.
2	October 17, 2008	978-4-09-121497-3
007. "IDOL BOMB!!" (IDOL BOMB!!, "Aidoru Bomu"); 008. "UP TO BOY" (UP TO BOY, "Appu Tu Bōi"); 009. "Am I Ordinary?" (ワタシ平凡?, "Watashi Heibon"); 010. "Single Star" (Single Star, "Shinguru Sutā"); tankōbon: "Shining Star" (Shining Star, "Shainingu Sutā"): 011. "Ellie SO SWEET" (エリー SO SWEET, "Erī Sō Suīto"); 012. "Coupling/With" (Coupling/With, "Kappuringu Wizu"); 013. "The Inside and Outside of a Big Wall" (大きな壁の中と外, "Ōkina Kabe no Naka to Soto"); 014. "Inside of Me......" (あたしの中の......, "Atashi no Naka no"); 015. "Open the Door" (扉を開けて, "Tobira o Akete"); 016. "The Last Day" (おしまいの日, "Oshimai no Hi"); @. "Changing World" (変わるセカイ, "Kawaru Sekai"); Character Profiles (with author's memo); Character 4-koma; Omake
Keima unrecognizably meets an idol named Kanon Nakagawa at the school's rooftop, causing him to be tased by her with stun guns. Elsie informs Keima that she detected a runaway spirit from Kanon, who recently returned to school to continue her study and became their classmate. The following days, Keima gets invited by Kanon to listen to her performance exclusively for him at the rooftop so that he would recognize her popularity but he ignores her while she sings, resulting in her becoming transparent. He ends up praising her voice instead, causing her to blushingly run away. The following days, Keima meets up with Kanon to listen to her predicaments since she valued him as her friend. On the day of her big event, Kanon goes missing. Keima finds her and convinces her to shine on her own instead of getting affected by people's view of her. The two end up kissing, purging the runaway spirit from Kanon. She then successfully performs in her concert. The next day, Elsie gets scolded by Keima for making a Hell-inspired bento. Later at school, Elsie's classmate named Chihiro Kosaka advises her to bake a cake for him. Her baking ends up disastrously but Keima praises her instead after he tasted her cake. The following day, Elsie visits a library and detects a runaway spirit from the reticent student librarian named Shiori Shiomiya. Keima begins his conquest of Shiori by engaging with her to make her talk. One day, Keima and Elsie overhear the library club meeting about building an audio-visual booth inside the facility but Shiori struggles to voice her opinion. The following day, Shiori decides to protest by locking herself inside the library. Keima joins her and inspires her to make conversation with others. He then kisses her, purging the runaway spirit from her. Shiori finally expresses her opinion to the library club president about their plan to discard books.
3	January 16, 2009	978-4-09-121570-3
017. "The Crusade that is Happening There" (今そこにある聖戦, "Ima Soko ni Aru Seisen"); 018. "A Lone Flower Blooming" (一花繚乱, "Ikkaryōran"); 019. "Between Heart and Duty" (以心分心, "Ishinbunshin"); 020. "Survival of the Kindest" (優勝烈敗, "Yūshōreppai"); 021. "Settled With a Fist" (一拳落着, "Ikkenrakuchaku"); 022. "The District Chief Comes!" (地区長、来たる。, "Chikuchō Kitaru"); 023. "To Threaten the District Chief" (地区長、脅迫される。, "Chikuchō Kyōhakusareru"); 024. "District Chief, Narration of Hell" (地区長、地獄を語る。, "Chikuchō Jigoku o Kataru"); 025. "District Chief, To Borrow Something" (地区長、捕りモノをする。, "Chikuchō Torimono o Suru"); 026. "District Chief, Regain Your Pride" (地区長、誇りを取り戻す。, "Chikuchō Hokori o Torimodosu"); Play Field Personal Information; Character Profile (with author's memo); Character 4-koma; Omake
Keima spends his whole day playing a bug dating sim that kept on looping titled "Ardent☆Tears". The following day, Keima is saved by Kusunoki Kasuga, the sole member of the girls' karate club who hated weak and cute things, from delinquent students. Elsie detects a runaway spirit from Kusunoki, pushing Keima to join the club as her disciple to begin his conquest of her. He finds her petting a stray cat, causing her to throw it out but her maiden personality manifests and saves the animal. Elsie then suggests the two go on a date to completely separate the feminine spirit from Kusunoki. It finally splits from her after she and Keima shared an ice cream. The two fight but Keima convinces them that being strong and cute were both good at the same time. The feminine Kusunoki agrees and concedes in her fight with the masculine Kusunoki but she pushes the latter to kiss Keima as a parting token, causing the runaway spirit to be purged from her. The next day, Keima and Elsie meet Haqua, Elsie's demon classmate and friend from New Hell who led Nagumo City's Area 32 as its district chief. Elsie then receives an order from Dokurō Skull to capture a runaway spirit that a certain district chief failed to contain. Keima deduces Haqua is the district chief that Dokurō Skull pertained to and offers his assistance to her in exchange for information about runaway spirits. Keima, Elsie, and Haqua later find the runaway spirit that had grown large from feeding on the negative energies of students in the school's theater building. The two demons struggle to capture it, earning Elsie a scolding from Haqua for being incompetent. Haqua continues to chase the escaped runaway spirit alone but she becomes frustrated about her poor work performance despite being a valedictorian, causing the runaway spirit to feed on her negative energy. Elsie tells Haqua that she would always be her inspiration, cutting her off from the runaway spirit's bond. The two successfully capture the runaway spirit and reconcile.
4	April 17, 2009	978-4-09-122004-2
027. "Tea for Three" (3人でお茶を。, "Sannin de Ocha o"); 028. "Rainy Days and Mondays" (雨の日と月曜日は, "Ame no Hi to Getsuyōbi wa"); 029. "If You Find Your Ways, It Always Rains" (たどりついたらいつも雨ふり, "Tadoritsuitara Itsumo Amefuri"); 030. "If the Rain Stopped" (雨がやんだら, "Ame ga Yandara"); 031. "10% Expected Rainfall" (10%の雨予報, "Jippāsento no Ame Yohō"); 032. "Singing in the Rain" (Singing in the Rain, "Shingingu In Za Rein"); 033. "God's Dynamic Shopping" (神様のダイナミックショッピング, "Kamisama no Dainamikku Shoppingu"); tankōbon: "First☆Errand" (はじめての☆おつかい, "Hajimete no Otsukai"): 034. "Brick☆Destruction" (つみき☆くずし, "Tsumiki Kuzushi"); 035. "Dawn☆of Something" (なにかの☆よあけ, "Nanika no Yoake"); 036. "24 Bit Eyes" (24ビットの瞳, "Nijūyonbitto no Hitomi"); Setting Information & Map; Bonus Illustration; Character Profile (with author's memo); Character 4-koma; Omake
Haqua visits the Katsuragi household to seek help from Keima and Elsie for writing a report about the recent event. At school, Keima becomes worried about the remaining 60,000 runaway spirits that they needed to capture when Elsie detected a runaway spirit from Chihiro, who got rejected by the captain of the soccer club for her love confession to him. The next day, Keima and Chihiro have a fallout due to his comment on her quick-moving to different guys after each of the previous rejections. A depressed Keima is approached by Ayumi then she convinces him to reconcile with Chihiro. While cleaning their classroom, Keima and Chihiro reunite then she seeks help from him on how to successfully confess her love to Yūta, the next guy she found. A few days later, Chihiro decides not to confess despite the preparations Keima made for her, causing him to become enraged at her. She runs away from him but he manages to find her at the beach park and convinces her to believe in herself to achieve what she desired then he kisses her, purging the runaway spirit from her. The following day, Chihiro decides to form a band as its vocalist and invites Elsie to be the guitarist. Sometime later, Keima and Elsie visit the next town to purchase the game titled "Love Tear~s". On her birthday, Keima's mom named Mari Katsuragi visits a mall with her son to bond with him. Back in the Katsuragi household, Mari and Elsie watch a TV show about how the Fallen God website that Keima ran saved the dating sim industry. A few days later, an optimistic student-teacher named Jun Nagase introduces herself to Keima's class and finds him playing games during class. While contemplating her plan for Keima, Jun unknowingly gets possessed by a runaway spirit.
5	July 17, 2009	978-4-09-121709-7
037. "Nagase Sensei of 2nd Year Class B" (2年B組長瀬先生, "Ninen Bīgumi Nagase Sensei"); 038. "School☆Wars" (スクール☆ウォーズ, "Sukūru Wōzu"); 039. "Eager Times" (熱中時代, "Netchū Jidai"); 040. "Scrapped Teacher" (スクラップト・ティーチャー, "Sukurapputo Tīchā"); 041. "In the Heart, the Sun Will Always..." (いつも心に太陽を, "Itsumo Kokoro ni Taiyō o"); 042. "A Demon that's Tiny = the Little Devil" (悪魔が小さいと書いて小悪魔なのダ, "Akuma ga Chiisai to Kaite Koakuma nano da"); 043. "Moon Child" (Moon Child, "Mūn Chairudo"); 044. "The Half Moon is the Color of Love" (ハーフムーンはときめき色, "Hāfu Mūn wa Tokimeki Iro"); tankōbon: "Half Moon of Love" (恋のハーフムーン, "Koi no Hāfu Mūn"): 045. "The Moon and a Glove" (月とテブクロ, "Tsuki to Tebukuro"); 046. "Mr. Moonlight" (Mr.ムーンライト, "Misutā Mūnraito"); School Map; Bonus Illustration; Character Profiles (with author's memo); Character 4-koma; Omake
Jun begins to approach Keima to help him enjoy attending school instead of playing games, which caused his conquest of her to become difficult. He changes his strategy by making her angry at him but he fails in his attempts. At the end of their class, Jun invites Keima to play PFP with her but she makes him angry instead over her comment about how he used games to escape reality. Keima plans to get close to her homeroom teacher named Yuri Nikaidō to gather information about Jun. He then discovers that she was part of the women's basketball club along with Yuri in their high school days. While watching a wrestling match, Keima confronts Jun about how her forcible ideals caused the club to get suspended indefinitely. Back in school, Jun runs away from her class when her students declined her invitation to join Maijima Marathon and began to voice their opinion about her serious approach towards them. Keima finalizes his conquest of Jun by convincing her to uphold her beliefs and instructing Elsie to bring the class to the gym where she was for them to reconcile. At the end of her two-week training, Jun promises Keima that she would become a better teacher and kisses him, purging the runaway spirit from her. Meanwhile, the section chiefs in New Hell meet up to observe Elsie's daily routine to see if she deserves to receive the Great Demon medal and become their poster girl for recruitment. Back in school, Keima encounters Tsukiyo Kujō, the astronomy club president who only wished to gaze at beautiful things, viewing the Moon with a telescope alongside her doll named Luna. Later night, Tsukiyo's body shrinks into doll size. The next day, Keima finds Tsukiyo in the astronomy club room and offers help to bring her back to the rooftop to view the Moon. He continues to assist in her daily routines the following days since she found living like a doll beautiful. Keima then asks Elsie to make everything bigger for Tsukiyo to think that she shrunk little by little as part of his conquest but she overhears them and flees to the rooftop. Keima jumps off from it to rescue a falling Tsukiyo and tells her that beauty could be found in the real world then they share a kiss, purging the runaway spirit from her and returning her body size to normal.
6	October 16, 2009	978-4-09-121788-2
047. "The Girl's Her" (彼女の彼女, "Kanojo no Kanojo"); 048. "Her and Her Circumstances" (彼女彼女の事情, "Kanojo Kanojo no Jijō"); 049. "Her, Her and Him" (彼女×彼女×彼, "Kanojo Kanojo Kare"); 050. "H2O" (H2O, "Eichitsūō"); 051. "Touch" (TOUCH, "Tatchi"); 052. "Slow Step" (スローステップ, "Surō Suteppu"); 053. "Sunlight All Around" (陽当たり良好, "Hiatari Ryōkō"); 054. "Four Girls and an Idol" (「4人とアイドル」, "Yonin to Aidoru"); 055. "HELP!" (HELP!, "Herupu"); 056. "Re 'Clean' Ion" (同"掃"会, "Dōsōkai"); Runaway Spirit Squad Equipment Information; Bonus Illustration; Character Profiles (with author's memo); Character 4-koma; Omake
Haqua visits the Katsuragi household and invites Keima to play Neo-Hellian Almagemachina, a game based on Battleship, but she gets defeated by him. Every time he wins, Keima asks Haqua questions about other methods of capturing runaway spirits aside from making the victim fall in love with him. He later meets Yukie Marui, a 54-year-old saleswoman and Haqua's buddy in searching runaway spirits, and decides to follow them. He then visits Yukie's house and converses with her about their latest search for runaway spirits, totaling 15. The next day, Keima joins Yukie in delivering Gokult (a nod to Yakult) to houses where runaway spirits possessed its residents. They meet a resident who was afraid of getting picked up named Asari and as Yukie interacts with her, Keima tells Haqua that Yukie's tiny encounters with victims would slowly help in their capture of runaway spirits. Back in his house, Keima ponders on Yukie's method and compares it to a wandering-type game. A week later, a still unconvinced Haqua shows Keima and Elsie her recent 4 captured runaway spirits. At school, Elsie detects a runaway spirit from Minami Ikoma, a fifteen-year-old student of Maijima Middle School and member of its swimming club. Keima purposefully swims in the pool for Minami to see his positive side as part of his conquest of her. Because of his plan, she begins stalking him and realizes that she fell in love with him. When they met on the bus, Keima invites Minami to join him in celebrating Tanabata. As they enjoy the festival, Minami opens up to Keima about how she felt about the end of her swimming career because she fails to be at the swim meet. He tells her to keep moving forward since every ending would make her strong then the two kiss, purging the runaway spirit from her. Sometime later, Elsie, Ayumi, Chihiro, and Miyako Terada begin to practice as a band but their song ends up horrible. Elsie suggests forming a light music club for them to continue practicing even at school but their English teacher who handled club formation named Ichiro Kodama tells them to get a perfect score in the upcoming exam first. Elsie brings Keima to tutor her, Ayumi, and Chihiro then Kanon suddenly showed up and joined them as well. During their tutoring session, Kanon asks Keima if they have met somewhere before, which made him worry since their memories should have lost after the runaway spirits purged from them. At the end of the exam, the band members (except Elsie) receive perfect scores but they still receive permission to form their club because Ichiro feels delighted that Keima only got a score of 99. Afterward, Elsie and Haqua return to New Hell to attend the biannual general meeting and reunite with their senpai named Nora. During the meeting, Dokurō Skull acknowledges Elsie for her effort in capturing 9 runaway spirits.
7	January 16, 2010	978-4-09-122137-7
057. "Reunion" (再会, "Saikai"); 058. "Metamorphosis" (変身, "Henshin"); 059. "Crisis" (危機, "Kiki"); 060. "Karma" (業果, "Gōka"); 061. "Two People" (二人, "Futari"); 062. "Encounter I" (邂逅I, "Kaikō Ichi"); 063. "Encounter II" (邂逅II, "Kaikō Ni"); 064. "Turnabout" (転結, "Tenketsu"); 065. "Girls Next Door" (ガールズ・ネクスト・ドア, "Gāruzu Nekusuto Doa"); 066. "Nights In White Satin" (Nights In White Satin, "Saten no Yoru"); Building Schematics & Exterior Illustration of Katsuragi's House; Character Profiles (with author's memo); Character 4-koma; Omake
In his summer vacation, Keima reunites with his childhood friend named Tenri Ayukawa but he vaguely remembers her. When she returned home from New Hell, Elsie's runaway spirit sensor goes off a bit in front of Tenri. The following day, Tenri tries to involve Keima in minor incidents as he goes to the mall. He realizes that her personality suddenly changed up. Nora and her buddy named Ryō Asama later find Tenri at the beach park to capture a runaway spirit from her. Nora scans her inner thoughts and finds Keima to be the cause of her heart's gap. She then decides to kill him to complete her task. As he received a warning from Tenri, Keima gets abducted by Nora to be executed at the beach park but she fails to do so. When Nora and Ryō left them, Tenri's other personality emerges and asks Keima and Elsie for protection. While they plan their next move, Keima and Tenri suddenly get attacked by Nora but they manage to escape and hide inside the school's theater building, where Tenri showed Keima a cave that they used to explore together in their childhood. Keima begins to recall his memories with her when they both got stuck inside it after an earthquake hit the beach park that their school used for their summer camping. Tenri tells him further that they encountered a group of runaway spirits while he was unconscious and she merged with an entity who helped them escape the cave, thus explaining her other personality. The entity emerges and explains to him that she was the one who ended Old Hell and sealed the runaway spirits. Their conversation is interrupted by Nora's sudden arrival but they still able to get away from her and reach the beach park. As he prepares his plan to fool Nora, Keima learns the entity's name is Diana. Nora arrives then Keima kisses Tenri, signaling Elsie to release the runaway spirit that Diana kept for herself to make Nora capture it instead of the entity. A few days later, Tenri moves next door to Keima's house. Diana then tells Keima she is a goddess from heaven and needs the host (Tenri) to fall in love to regain her power. Sometime later, the Katsuragi family visits their relative in the countryside to celebrate Obon. During their stay, Keima and Elsie hear a singsong voice warning them to play with her or their body parts will cut off.
8	April 16, 2010	978-4-09-122266-4
067. "Ride My See-Saw" (Ride My See-Saw, "Raido Mai Shīsō"); 068. "Every Good Girl Deserves Favour" (Every Good Girl Deserves Favour, "Dōmu"); 069. "Uneasiness Charsiu" (胸さわぎチャーシュー, "Munasawagi Chāshū"); 070. "Selfish Meatball" (勝手にミートボール, "Katte ni Mītobōru"); 071. "Effort Rice Cake" (努力もち, "Doryoku Mochi"); 072. "A Ramen Called Youth" (青春という名のラーメン, "Seishun to Iu Na no Rāmen"); 073. "Escape from the Seraglio" (後宮よりの逃走, "Kōkyū yori no Tōsō"); 074. "The Magic Flute" (魔笛, "Mateki"); 075. "Summer Wars" (サマーウォーズ, "Samā Wōzu"); 076. "A Flying Knight Falls Prey to a Pawn" (桂の高飛び歩の餌食, "Kei no Takatobi Fu no Ejiki"); Cafe Grandpa Interior Illustration; Character Profiles (with author's memo); Character 4-koma; Omake
Keima and Elsie play with Airi, their neighbor's granddaughter. Later night, they hear the voice again coming from the ghost that resembled Airi. Keima confronts the ghost who turned out to be the manifestation of their neighbor named Rieko Hinaga while Elsie persuades the runaway spirit to come out of Rieko. Keima and the spirit Rieko come to an understanding that she already lived a wonderful life despite becoming alone as time passes by, closing the gap in the actual Rieko's heart and purging the runaway spirit from her. Upon returning home, Elsie eagers to eat ramen with Keima but every time they visit ramen shops, a girl wearing China dress purchases their remaining stock of ramen shortly. Since they detected a runaway spirit from the girl named Sumire Uemoto, Keima and Elsie follow her inside a ramen shop and discover that she worked there with her father being the owner and cook. Keima begins his conquest of Sumire by becoming a part-timer in their shop. As he helps the place, Keima learns that Sumire wanted to surpass her father by creating her version of ramen, thus explaining her frequent visit to other ramen shops for research. She decides to make him her food sampler but her father pleads her to stop making ramen because he sees no future for her in it. Keima helps Sumire's father to understand that Sumire found happiness being the daughter of a ramen chef. He then decides to hand over the shop to his daughter. As gratitude for helping her reconcile with her father, Sumire gives Keima donburi and kisses him, purging the runaway spirit from her. After the recent event, Keima has one day left before the end of his summer vacation to play games but he gets disturbed by the sudden visit of Tenri and Haqua. Elsie then panicky informs him that Nora would be transferred to their area as its district chief. Nora tells Haqua and Tenri a rumor about new demons plotting to revive Old Hell and gods living among humans. After Nora left them, Diana thanks Haqua for not revealing her existence. Later night, Keima receives an email from a game developer asking for his ideas to make a perfect gal game. Back in school, Chihiro's band named "2B Pencils" struggles to find their drummer. As she tries to recruit Keima to be their drummer, Elsie detects a runaway spirit from a second-year high school student and shogi player named Nanaka Haibara, who visited their school and defeated its shogi club representative. As he thinks of a way to meet Nanaka because she attends a different school, Keima sees Tenri wearing the same uniform as her and hiding from someone.
9	June 18, 2010	978-4-09-122329-6
077. "Don't Let King and Rook Get Close Together" (王飛近づくべからず, "Ō Hi Chikazukubekarazu"); 078. "All is Fair in the Endgame" (寄せは俗手で, "Yose wa Zokute de"); 079. "With Three Knights There Must Be a Mate" (三桂あって詰まぬことなし, "Sankei Atte Tsumanu Koto Nashi"); 080. "An Intrusion in Pajamas" (パジャマでおじゃま, "Pajama de Ojama"); 081. "Young Girl, Young Boy" (少女・少年, "Shōjo Shōnen"); 082. "My And Her Eye-to-Eye " (僕と彼女の目×目, "Boku to Kanojo no Ai Tū Ai"); 083. "The Changelings" (とりかへばや, "Torikaebaya"); 084. "Pretty Faces" (プリティフェイシズ, "Puriti Feishizu"); 085. "Twinkle Trickster" (♂ティンクル^{2}♀トリックスター, "Tinkuru Tinkuru Torikkusutā"); 086. "I'm Her and the Heroine is in the Hero" (おれがあいつでヒロインがヒーローインで, "Ore ga Aitsu de Hiroin ga Hīrō In de)"); Class 2B Seating Arrangement (with author's memo); Character Profile (with author's memo); Character 4-koma; Omake
Tenri reveals to Keima that she defeated Nanaka in shogi with the help of Diana. Nanaka finds Tenri and demands a rematch since she never had lost until now. Keima challenges Nanaka instead as part of his conquest and wins against her. Diana becomes ragefully jealous when Elsie mentioned Keima kissing victims to purge runaway spirits from them and challenges him for a real shogi match instead of going along with his plan of intentionally making him lose in front of Nanaka. After he got defeated, Keima starts to train Nanaka to win her next match. On the day of their game, Nanaka finally defeats Tenri. Later night, Nanaka tells Keima that getting defeated could be a great experience then she kisses him, purging the runaway spirit from her. Back in his room, Keima is visited by Diana to ask for help in finding her siblings called Jupiter Sisters. She tells him a hint that if one of his previous conquested girls could remember him then she might harbor one of her sisters. The following day, Keima bumps into an ojōsama and a member of the wind instrument music club named Yui Goidō and clashes with her high-class mother who accompanied her to force her to quit the club. Back in her manor, Yui wishes to become free of her parents' radical upbringing. Keima begins his conquest by getting closer to Yui for her to see him as a hero who could save her from her parents' shackles. At night, Keima and Yui realize they switch bodies. They agree to behave according to their swapped bodies for the time being. A few days later, Yui (in Keima's body) joins 2B Pencils as their drummer while Keima (in Yui's body) becomes addicted to otome games. As he ponders about his personality slowly changing into feminine, Keima bumps into Mio who worked in a bakery shop to help her mother with their financial needs. He then discovers in their conversation that she could not forget about a certain boy who accompanied her at the high-class party before, suggesting a goddess possibly resides in her.
10	September 15, 2010 (limited edition); September 17, 2010 (regular edition)	978-4-09-941700-0 (limited edition); 978-4-09-122522-1 (regular edition)
087. "Princess Doubt" (プリンセス・ダウト, "Purinsesu Dauto"); 088. "Bodyjack" (ボディジャック, "Bodijakku"); 089. "Turn A" (ターンA, "Tān Ē"); 090. "SISTER GENIUS" (SISTER GENIUS, "Shisutā Jīniasu"); 091. "SISTER GLAMOROUS" (SISTER GLAMOROUS, "Shisutā Guramarasu"); 092. "SISTERS SCHEME" (SISTERS SCHEME, "Shisutāzu Sukīmu"); tankōbon: "SISTER SCHEME" (SISTER SCHEME, "Shisutā Sukīmu"): 093. "SISTER GIANT" (SISTER GIANT, "Shisutā Jaianto"); 094. "Teach Us!! Kami-nii~sama!!" (おしえて!! 神に~さま!!, "Oshiete Kaminīsama"); 095. "SISTER NAKED" (SISTER NAKED, "Shisutā Neikiddo"); tankōbon: "SISTER SECRET" (SISTER SECRET, "Shisutā Shīkuretto"): 096. "SISTER GIANT" (SISTER GIANT, "Shisutā Jaianto"); tankōbon: "SISTER NAKED" (SISTER NAKED, "Shisutā Neikiddo"): Maijima School Uniform (winter and summer version) Illustration; Character Profiles (with author's memo); Character 4-koma; Omake; Box cover (limited edition); Flag. 0 DVD (limited edition)
Keima concludes Mio is not possessed by a goddess based on how she described her memories of him at the high-class party. He decides to avoid Yui in the meantime for her to feel a need to rescue him. A few days later, Keima tells Yui to meet him at her manor. As she rescues Keima from her family, Yui voices out to her mother about how she should have free will instead of a lifestyle being controlled by them then she kisses him, reverting them to their original bodies and purging the runaway spirit from her. Elsie struggles to contain it that turned into a giant spider with Yui's form but someone lurking behind manages to capture it for her. The next day, Keima and Elsie find Yui dressing and acting masculinely as she tells Chihiro and Ayumi about her interest to join 2B Pencils as their drummer. Sometime later, Keima and Elsie detect a runaway spirit from a fashion designer who recently saved them from delinquents. They track her location at Kusunoki's dojo and learn the fashion designer named Hinoki Kasuga is her older sister. Keima begins his conquest of Hinoki by joining the dojo. He later finds Kusunoki recognizing him as the one who joined her girls' karate club before and deduces that a goddess might be within her but he eventually refutes it because her memory of him at the end is altered. As she tells her childhood to Keima, Hinoki's body suddenly becomes huge but it turns out to be an illusion only he can see. The following day, Hinoki invites Keima to join her dojo faction but he declines because he finds Kusunoki stronger than her, causing Hinoki to spar with her sister to showcase her strength. Back in school, Kusunoki approaches Keima to know if her older sister is hiding something but their conversation is interrupted when he received a letter from Weekly Shōnen Sunday editor-in-chief Masaki Nawata instructing him to teach manga readers methods of capturing girls for the new school term and learned about the anime adaptation of The World God Only Knows. Afterward, Keima and Elsie conclude that Hinoki's huge desires could be the cause of her gigantic appearance. As he tries to peep on Hinoki while she bathes, Keima witnesses her body growing large and learns that she knew about it. He offers help to return her to normal since they were the only ones who could see her transformation. The next day, Keima learns in their conversation at the beach that Hinoki was fixated on her pride as an older sister.
11	December 17, 2010	978-4-09-159079-4 (limited edition); 978-4-09-122679-2 (regular edition)
097. "SISTER PANIC" (SISTER PANIC, "Shisutā Panikku"); 098. "SISTER PANIC 2" (SISTER PANIC2, "Shisutā Panikku Ni"); 099. "SISTER SISTER" (SISTER SISTER, "Shisutā Shisutā"); 100. "SISTER SISTER 2" (SISTER SISTER2, "Shisutā Shisutā Ni"); 101. "SISTER STANDING" (SISTER STANDING, "Shisutā Sutandingu"); 102. "Devil May Cry" (Devil May Cry, "Debiru Mei Kurai"); 103. "Devil May Try" (Devil May Try, "Debiru Mei Torai"); 104. "First of All a Triage" (とりあえずトリアージ, "Toriaezu Toriāji"); 105. "Triangle Love Letter" (トライアングルラブレター, "Toraianguru Rabu Retā"); 106. "Three of A Perfect Pair" (Three of A Perfect Pair, "Surī Obu A Pāfekuto Pea"); Hell Setting; Character Profile (with author's memo); Character 4-koma; Omake; Calendar (limited edition)
Keima returns to the dojo to seek help from Kusunoki. Meanwhile, the gigantic Hinoki encounters her younger sister at the top of a building and regrets to hear it is her fault that Kusunoki abandoned her femininity to take over the dojo since she left the place. Her huge form suddenly becomes visible to residents and destroys some parts of Maijima City. It turns out that a renegade from Runaway Spirit Squad took Kusunoki's form to taunt Hinoki for her runaway spirit to evolve. District chiefs Haqua, Nora, and Shalia witness the chaos in the city. Keima brings Kusunoki to the beach where Hinoki was then they get swallowed by her and reach the "gap" of her heart. Kusunoki encounters painful memories of Hinoki while exploring the gap and learns that she got envied by her older sister because she surpasses her. Kusunoki tells Hinoki that she would always love her as her younger sister, purging the runaway spirit from her. The district chiefs struggle to contain the huge runaway spirit until Yuri, who turned out to be a demon that captured Yui's runaway spirit back then, intervenes and captures it for them. Before leaving Japan, Hinoki kisses Keima in front of Elsie and Kusunoki. After the event, Elsie becomes depressed because she fails to capture the recent runaway spirit. Chihiro and Ayumi then help Keima to cheer up Elsie by sending them on a date. Keima and Elsie visit an amusement park and a fire station where she mostly became excited because she gets to see her favorite firetrucks. Sometime later, Keima visits a batting center while trying to narrow down gal game genres he should only play. Back in the Katsuragi household, Tenri visits Keima to give him a souvenir. Diana then takes the opportunity to bring Keima and Tenri together for a date in an amusement park when he wanted to cooperate with her in finding her siblings. Haqua, who also visited the household, gets invited by Keima as well because her knowledge of New Hell is also needed. As they go on date, Keima tells Diana and Haqua that he would utilize the upcoming two-day cultural festival in finding goddesses within his previous conquested girls.
12	April 18, 2011	978-4-09-159093-0 (limited edition); 978-4-09-122792-8 (regular edition)
107. "RUN RUN RUN" (RUN RUN RUN, "Ran Ran Ran"); 108. "Venus in Furs" (Venus in Furs, "Bīnasu In Fāzu"); 109. "Miss Robot" (ミス ロボット, "Misu Robotto"); 110. "Do Androids Dream of Chicken Cutlets?" (アンドロイドはチキンカツの夢を見るか?, "Andoroido wa Chikinkatsu no Yume o Miruka"); 111. "Mannequin" (マネキン, "Manekin"); 112. "Absolute Girlfriend" (絶対彼女, "Zettai Kanojo"); 113. "AI" (A・I, "Ē Ai"); 114. "Apollo" (アポロ, "Aporo"); 115. "Fragments of the Sun" (太陽の破片, "Taiyō no Hahen"); 116. "When the Sun Goes Down" (When the Sun Goes Down, "Fen Za San Gōzu Daun"); Stainless Bookmark (limited edition)
Keima and Chihiro join the three-legged race for the upcoming sports festival. Ayumi helps Keima practice, causing Chihiro to question him if he has a history with her. Presuming that there might be a goddess in Chihiro, Keima asks her instead if she remembers him kissing her before but she awkwardly denies it. On the day of the sports festival, Keima and Chihiro manage to run in the race and their class wins the championship at the end. The following day, Keima and Elsie detect a runaway spirit from Akari Kurakawa, a biology club member who built a cardboard box robot to turn it into a human and present it during the cultural festival. He helps her to make her robot approachable for students and tells her that love could transform robots into humans then he kisses her but she gives no response. Afterward, Keima visits her in the biology club and receives kisses frequently from Akari since she found it useful for her creation of a human. His conquest of Akari becomes troublesome because she wants to create a perfect human while she sees him as imperfect. They discuss the difference between having a perfect or imperfect world, which she enjoyed. Akari kisses Keima as a farewell and disappears. She then meets up with Yuri at the school's theater building to discuss the failure of her fake runaway spirit that Elsie detected earlier to lure out The Prey. On the other hand, the renegade from Runaway Spirit Squad enrolls at Maijima Academy. Meanwhile, Kanon befriends a Jupiter Sister residing in her named Apollo, who restored her memories with Keima. She is being stalked by the renegade demon, who believed in the rumor about the presence of goddesses, and decides to approach Keima for help then she confesses her love to him. Apollo suddenly takes over Kanon's body and thanks Keima for helping her regain a bit of her power before leaving. Later, the renegade demon introduces herself to a fleeing Apollo as a member of Vintage named Fiore and stabs her.
13	June 17, 2011	978-4-09-159100-5 (limited edition); 978-4-09-123139-0 (regular edition)
117. "CUE" (CUE, "Kyū"); 118. "Scramble Formation" (スクランブルフォーメーション, "Sukuranburu Fōmēshon"); 119. "Look Back in Anger" (Look Back in Anger, "Rukku Bakku In Angā"); 120. "PEACE" (PEACE, "Pīsu"); 121. "Cast Off" (キャストオフ, "Kyasuto Ofu"); 122. "Confession 2/5" (告白 2/5, "Kokuhaku Gobun no Ni"); 122b. "The World The Little Demon Only Knows" (コアクマのみぞ知るセカイ, "Koakuma nomi zo Shiru Sekai"); 123. "Profect A" (Project A, "Purojekuto Ē"); 124. "Loverary" (Loverary, "Raburarī"); 125. "Autumn Tale of Six Boys and Girls" (男女6人秋物語, "Danjo Rokunin Aki Monogatari"); 126. "5 HOME" (5 HOME, "Go Hōmu"); Digital Clock (limited edition)
A wounded Kanon is brought to Keima's house. Haqua and Diana attempt to remove the impaled dagger but they fail because of its powerful assassination spell. They deduce that she would die in a week. Keima begins to plan on finding the Jupiter Sisters by making Elsie disguise as Kanon temporarily, sending his mother away for safety, and partnering with Haqua. The following day, Keima and Haqua, disguising as Elsie, take advantage of the rumor about Kanon's love confession to him to determine if his conquered girls with goddesses in them will react to it. Keima concludes Jun and Minami are not possessed by goddesses when the former did not get jealous of his fake introduction of Haqua as his girlfriend and the latter could not remember him. He further crosses out on his list the conquered girls that he could not stumble upon, ending up with 5 girls remaining to check if they harbor hidden Jupiter Sisters: Ayumi, Chihiro, Tsukiyo, Shiori, and Yui. On the second day of his goddess search, Keima plans to confess his love to the girls to draw out goddesses from them and help them regain their powers at the same time, starting with Ayumi and Chihiro. Meanwhile, Elsie performs her duty as an idol on behalf of Kanon. Back in school, Keima visits Tsukiyo and confirms her anger towards him due to the rumor. He then drops by the library to check on Shiori but he is suddenly approached by Yui and hears her love confession for him. On the third day of his goddess search, Keima follows the after-school event schedule he created to deepen his relationship with the 5 girls. He accompanies Tsukiyo first on her way home to earn her trust while Haqua tries to keep Ayumi and Chihiro from going home until either of them becomes next in his schedule. Afterward, Keima returns to school and sees Yui leaving the school already but he encounters Ayumi, who left Haqua and Chihiro behind.
14	September 14, 2011 (limited edition); September 16, 2011 (regular edition)	978-4-09-941711-6 (limited edition); 978-4-09-123237-3 (regular edition)
127. "Twin Booking" (ツインブッキング, "Tsuin Bukkingu"); 128. "Collaboration" (コラボレーション, "Koraborēshon"); 129. "Close to the Edge" (Close to the Edge, "Kurōzu Tu Ji Ejji"); 130. "Cheap Trick" (Cheap Trick, "Chīpu Torikku"); 131. "Multiple Simultaneous Developments" (同時多発的展開, "Dōji Tahatsuteki Tenkai"); 132. "Doll Roll Hall" (Doll Roll Hall, "Dōru Rōru Hōru"); 133. "Canon doll" (Canondoll, "Kyanondōru"); 134. "Strike Witches" (Strike Witches, "Sutoraiku Witchizu"); 135. "Mission Incomplete" (Mission in complete, "Misshon In Konpurīto"); 136. "War by Proxy" (代理戦争, "Dairi Sensō"); OVA (limited edition)
Keima's next girl on his after-school event schedule is Ayumi but he struggles to accompany her because Miyako tags along. The situation becomes worse when he saw Haqua and Chihiro walking in the same direction as theirs. Keima brings Ayumi and Miyako inside a mall while Haqua, upon seeing him as well on their way to an instrument shop, keeps Chihiro away from Ayumi. Keima switches place with Haqua to accompany Chihiro next in the shop. Afterward, Keima and Haqua visit the school's library to check on Shiori next. While Haqua lures her away from the reception, Keima reads Shiori's unfinished sci-fi novel with settings similar to his conquest of her before and adds his version on the story until she returns and counters his revisions by writing back different scenes. As he waits for Shiori to leave the library to go home with her, Keima encounters Yui outside and receives a girl's school uniform as a gift from her for their date. The following day, Nora visits Keima's house to introduce Fiore as a new spirit hunter assigned in her district. Keima becomes suspicious of Fiore so he sets trap for her by using the goddess sensor he found at the school's theater where Kanon got stabbed. He then sees her taking the bait and tells Nora that she might be a member of Vintage. Keima begins to interrogate a captured Fiore and offers Nora to work with him in exchange for her to take all the credit once New Hell is saved. He leaves to visit Shiori again in the library to continue his reconquest of her. After he read Shiori's historical novel and earned her trust, Keima suddenly gets attacked by Luna, who turned out to be under control from a goddess named Vulcan, and receives a warning from it to not come near Tsukiyo. Meanwhile, Haqua brings Nora into Keima's room to show her a wounded Kanon and they see miasma continuously growing from her. On the other hand, Keima reaches the school's rooftop to talk to a jealous Tsukiyo while evading Vulcan's attacks. Back in Keima's house, Fiore manages to escape her imprisonment and subdues Haqua and Nora. Meanwhile, Keima manages to regain Tsukiyo's trust and receives a kiss from her, reviving the Jupiter Sister within her. Afterward, he returns home and sees the situation between the demons then he gets imprisoned by Fiore alongside Haqua and Nora. Vulcan comes to aid when Keima brought her back home as well and she heard from Fiore about Vintage's plan of capturing the Jupiter Sisters.
15	December 16, 2011	978-4-09-159107-4 (limited edition); 978-4-09-123429-2 (regular edition)
137. "Capture" (捕獲, "Hokaku"); 137b. "The World The Little Demon Only Knows" (コアクマのみぞ知るセカイ, "Koakuma nomi zo Shiru Sekai"); 138. "One Difficulty After Another" (一難去って, "Ichinan Satte"); 139. "Case By Case By Case" (ケース・バイ・ケース・バイ・ケース, "Kēsu Bai Kēsu Bai Kēsu"); 140. "Perfect Heroine" (パーフェクトヒロイン, "Pāfekuto Hiroin"); 141. "Mr. Lady Ms. Gentleman" (Mr.レディ Ms.ジェントルマン, "Misutā Redi Misu Jentoruman"); 142. "Punch DE Date" (パンチDEデート, "Panchi de Dēto"); 143. "Knight in Night" (ナイトinナイト, "Naito In Naito"); 144. "Fleeting Get-Together" (一過団欒, "Ikkadanran"); 145. "Close Romantic Encounters of the Third Kind" (第三種恋愛接近遭遇, "Daisanshu Ren'ai Sekkin Sōgū"); 146. "Text Adventure" (テキスト・アバンチュール, "Tekisuto Abanchūru"); Glowing Figure Strap (limited edition)
Vulcan manages to defeat Fiore and save Keima, Haqua, and Nora. Diana arrives and sees her sister's wings from behind, making her jealous because it is a sign of true power whereas she only has a halo. Meanwhile, Elsie continues her life as an idol for Kanon's sake. She prepares to perform for a concert near Maijima Station and sees Chihiro among the crowd then she chats with her since she missed her already but Chihiro unable to identify her as Elsie. Back in Keima's house, Diana and Vulcan successfully pull out the dagger from Apollo, freeing her from curse and death, but her unconscious body activates a hydration spell as her countermeasure. To break Apollo free of her spell, the goddesses mention another of their sisters named Mercury as the one who could help them. As Haqua privately asks Keima for forgiveness due to her failure to keep Fiore in check, Diana barges in to ask him for a kiss but she finds it difficult. Keima apologizes for being a burden to her goal of regaining her power but Diana begins to trust him even more. As she walks back home, Tenri feels a sensation of Diana's wings growing from behind. Keima sends Tsukiyo home for safety as he continues to find the other Jupiter Sisters. He encounters Yui and goes on a date with her while acting as the heroine but he finds being conquered by her difficult because it will not increase her love, thus unable to revive the goddess within her. The next day, Keima dresses up as a girl in the school uniform that Yui gave to him to attract her attention and stimulate her love affection towards him then he invites her for a date but she blushingly runs away instead. As she calms down in a toilet room, Yui meets for the first time a goddess named Mars reflecting on the mirror. After school, Keima and Yui go on a date at the amusement park while a member of Vintage sneakily watches them. Inside a castle attraction, Yui finds Keima unconscious and being held hostage by the stalking Vintage agent. Mars takes over Yui's body to save him and defeats the Vintage operative, who turned out to be Haqua in disguise as part of Keima's plan of using a fake crisis to stimulate the Jupiter Sister residing in her. Yui kisses Keima after she found him safe, reviving the goddess within her. Afterward, Keima and Haqua return home then they meet Elsie preparing for dinner and taking a break before she returns to work. The following day, Shiori tries to understand her feelings towards Keima and has another encounter with a goddess roaming around the library. After she visited Keima's class, Shiori meets him cross-dressing in the library. They later walk home together and visit a ramen shop, where she decided to write a novel based on him. The next day, Keima finds Shiori unable to write a novel.
16	March 16, 2012	978-4-09-159112-8 (limited edition); 978-4-09-123563-3 (regular edition)
147. "Elopement" (逃避行, "Tōhikō"); 148. "The Long Confinement" (かくも長き籠城, "Kakumo Nagaki Rōjō"); 149. "About Me." (私について。, "Watashi ni Tsuite"); 150. "Welcome Hell" (Welcome to Hell, "Werukamu Tu Heru"); 151. "Arrested Development" (Arrested Development, "Aresuteddo Diveroppumento"); 152. "Brand new Guests" (Brand new Guests, "Burando Nyū Gesutsu"); 153. "I, Me, Mine" (アイ・みー・まいン, "Ai Mī Main"); 154. "PLAY THE GAME" (PLAY THE GAME, "Purei Za Gēmu"); 155. "Silhouette Romance" (シルエット・ロマンス, "Shiruetto Romansu"); 156. "I Heard You" (聞いてたんだよ, "Kiitetan dayo"); Scythe Shaped Mechanical Pencil (limited edition)
Keima decides to hole up in the library with Shiori until she finishes writing her novel. Haqua leaves him to attend a meeting between district chiefs. Keima tells a struggling Shiori to write a story about herself instead. Because of his encouragement and another encounter with her goddess, Shiori finally writes a novel about her life as a student librarian. After he read her love confession for him at the end of her novel, Keima meets the goddess within Shiori named Minerva. Meanwhile, Haqua raises concern about the sudden order of searching goddesses during the meeting in New Hell. Afterward, she secretly meets up with Dokurō Skull to talk about Vintage. As she prepares to depart New Hell, Haqua is confined by members of the Public Safety Department for violating her duties. Nora then visits her to inform her about the involvement of higher-ups in her arrest, a plan to search for missing Fiore, and her desire to join Vintage. Back in his house, Keima suddenly collapses due to cold. Lune, an executive member of Vintage, checks on other members by sending a test call in their goddess sensors. She has not received a response from Fiore so she prepares to visit her location but she eventually gets a response when Ryō arrived at Keima's house and pressed Fiore's skull sensor upon Nora's orders. Keima calls Ayumi to give her a hint about her cold for her to visit him as part of his last search for the remaining Jupiter Sister. As Ayumi attends to Keima in his room, Chihiro suddenly arrives to hand over Elsie's music sheet. He quickly hides Ayumi on his bed to avoid them meeting each other. Chihiro plays a tune on her guitar for him before leaving. As they were left alone again, Keima and Ayumi hear Chihiro's love confession for him by the door. Back in New Hell, the Public Safety Department begins their interrogation of Haqua but she refuses to cooperate because she assumes they are part of Vintage. On the other hand, Ayumi calls Chihiro to confirm her confession.
17	July 18, 2012	978-4-09-123696-8
157. "Flag ∞ Propagation" (フラグ∞増殖, "Furagu Zōshoku"); 158. "Goddess Mix" (めがみみっくす, "Megami Mikkusu"); 159. "Aqua Lung" (アクアラング, "Akua Rangu"); 160. "Drop Out" (ドロップアウト, "Doroppu Auto"); 161. "Break-out" (脱出, "Dasshutsu"); 162. "The Eve" (前夜祭, "Zen'yasai"); 163. "Scramble Crossing" (スクらんぶる交差点, "Sukuranburu Kōsaten"); 164. "It's Alright" (いいよ, "Ii yo"); 165. "Rooftop" (屋上, "Okujō"); 166. "Absent Lovers" (Absent Lovers, "Abusento Rabāzu"); 167. "WHAM" (ゴズ, "Gozu")
Ayumi gives support to Chihiro's genuine love for Keima. He plans to play games to regain strength when Diana interrupted and asked him to summon the Jupiter Sisters he had found so far. Elsie manages to bring the 3 goddesses into Keima's house, where they scuffled to win over him for their hosts' sake. The goddesses then begin to call out Apollo to disable her hydration spell and come out from sleeping. Keima is suddenly transported to Apollo's divination world hovering above Maijima City and is told by Apollo herself that she needed three days to pray for the city's purification. Upon returning to his room, Keima's cold is healed. The Jupiter Sisters fail to summon back Apollo and heed Keima's instruction to go home for now. Back in New Hell, Haqua is tortured by the Public Safety Department and is informed that she was relieved of her duty as a district chief by Dokurō Skull. As she is about to get her memories erased, Haqua is saved by Dokurō Skull, who admitted her allegiance to Vintage. She helps Haqua to escape New Hell and asks her to stop Vintage. On the other hand, Shalia admits to Nora that she informed the Public Safety Department about Haqua. With Haqua's removal from her position, Lune becomes the new district chief and requests Haqua's activity logs. Back in school, Chihiro invites Keima to dance with her at the campfire on the eve of the cultural festival. He then approaches Ayumi for advice in making his date with Chihiro successful. While taking out the trash together, Keima receives a guitar pick from Chihiro. Afterward, he tells Ayumi that he would kiss Chihiro later to make her jealous as a means of confirming a goddess within her but Ayumi seems supportive of his plan. On the eve of the cultural festival, Keima and Chihiro go on a date. They arrive at a rooftop and as he prepares to kiss Chihiro, Keima discovers that she could not remember his conquest of her because she mentions it will be her first kiss from him. Chihiro tells him that she was in love with him before the time of his conquest of her. Because there is no goddess in Chihiro, Keima declines her love confession while Ayumi overhears them afar. Ayumi then confronts him for hurting Chihiro's feelings. Back in Keima's house, Diana visits him while he is taking a bath and admits that she seemed to fall in love with him.
18	July 18, 2012	978-4-09-123710-1
168. "Bath Stop" (バス・ストップ, "Basu Sutoppu"); 169. "Abyss" (淵, "Fuchi"); 170. "Holes" (穴, "Ana"); 171. "For a Few Lovers More" (For a Few Lovers More, "Fō A Fyū Rabāzu Moa"); 172. "The Good, The Bad, and The Ugly" (The Good, The Bad, and The Ugly, "Za Guddo Za Baddo Ando Zi Agurī"); 173. "Punish Vanish" (Punish Vanish, "Panisshu Banisshu"); 174. "Labyrinth" (ラビリンス, "Rabirinsu"); 175. "Riot" (RIOT, Raiotto); 176. "Wicked Genius" (Wicked Genius, "Wikiddo Jīniasu"); 177. "Evil Flowers" (悪の華, "Aku no Hana"); 178. "Unique Spot" (特異点, "Tokuiten")
Diana pushes Tenri to love Keima before she completely falls in love. After his bath, Keima watches Tenri perform her magic tricks as her way of cheering him up. The following day, Elsie arrives for their band practice and discusses with Keima about the school's emblem, leading him to ask Shiori for help in finding books and documents related to the school's foundation because he finds it connected to current events. He investigates the theater building, the oldest building in school history, and finds the hole that led to the cave sealed. Keima and Elsie then visit the other end of the cave located at an artificial beach but they find it closed as well. They see a rock formation at the sea near the area and upon reaching its underground, find a nest of matured runaway spirits. They manage to flee the place while Yuri and Akari, who sealed off the cave's entrances, observe them from a distance. Keima continues to reconquer Ayumi by helping the class in their cafe booth during the cultural festival's opening day as its barista while she serves as its waitress. Chihiro later tells Ayumi about being dumped by Keima and requests to not mention her if she talks with him. Meanwhile, Lune requests additional troops for her hunting of goddesses. Keima bumps into Sumire, who set up a ramen booth in the school, and Chihiro, whom he requested a team up to complete his reconquest of Ayumi. Vintage begins their move by capturing Sumire and the other Keima's conquered girls, along with the Jupiter Sisters. Keima, Ayumi, and Chihiro are attacked by Vintage when Haqua showed up and saved them. To cover up the incident, Keima and Haqua pretend to be part of a special effects club. Nora arrives and offers help in keeping Ayumi safe. Back in Keima's house, Diana appears safe from Vintage's attacks. Haqua informs Keima about the objective of the group to build Old Hell in the human world while Chihiro eavesdropping on their conversation. She further explains the rock formation will serve as the "gate" between Hell and Earth for the main force and the Vintage will open it by tomorrow. Keima reaffirms his plan to reconquer Ayumi to bring out the last Jupiter Sister within her. He later finds Chihiro eavesdropping on them when her phone call from Ayumi rang then he answers it to inform the latter that he would confess his love for her.
17+18	July 18, 2012	978-4-09-941802-1
A combined issue of volumes 17 and 18, bundled with a limited edition art book, titled Every Lovely Angel.
19	October 16, 2012 (limited edition); October 18, 2012 (regular edition)	978-4-09-941803-8 (limited edition); 978-4-09-123885-6 (regular edition)
179. "One Night Gigolo" (ONE NIGHT GIGOLO, "Wan Naito Jigoro"); 180. "The Young Lady of the Fire-Crackling Summer" (飛んで火に入る夏の令嬢, "Tonde Hi ni Hairu Natsu no Reijō"); 181. "Cheers" (かんぱい, "Kanpai"); 182. "True Love" (TRUE LOVE, "Turū Rabu"); W. "Once Upon a Time in Maijima" (ONCE UPON A TIME IN MAIJIMA, "Wansu Apon A Taimu In Maijima"); 183. "Embracing Tonight" (抱きしめてTONIGHT, "Dakishimete Tunaito"); 184. "Show Me" (SHOW ME, "Shō Mī"); 185. "Shadow City" (シャドーシティ, "Shadō Shiti"); 186. "ff" (ff, "Forutesshimo"); 187. "Wedding Bells" (ウエディング・ベル, "Uedingu Beru"); 188. "It's All Right" (It's All Right, "Ittsu Ōru Raito"); 189. "The Memory of My First Love" (初めて恋をした記憶, "Hajimete Koi o Shita Kioku")
Keima visits Ayumi's house while Haqua, Chihiro, and Nora observe afar then awkwardness ensues when he found her taking a bath and her panties got involved. He invites him to meet him by the riverbank. Haqua briefly explains to Chihiro how he would help them in saving the world from Vintage. Keima meets Ayumi at the location but they immediately leave the place when Vintage tracked them. They arrive at a playground park but his confession for Ayumi gets interrupted when Vintage arrived. They flee the area and take a break near a convenience store where Lune found them but Nora intercepts her. Chihiro offers a place to hide from Vintage. They arrive at Miyako's place where Chihiro revealed to Ayumi about Keima's deception, causing the latter to become pissed off at him and run away. Chihiro explains to Keima she exposes him to make him fall in love with Ayumi instead of conquering her based on games. He later picks up Ayumi while riding a horse and confesses he will stay true to himself as he conveys his feelings towards her. Ayumi suggests marriage to him to prove his love for her then she brings him to her parents to introduce him as her groom, making her father furious at him. Keima proposes to her in front of her parents as he presents her with a wedding gown. Hilarity follows when Ayumi pushed him to say he loves her with heart's intent and her parents decided to go back to sleep. She tells him to meet her by the ocean and leaves him behind. Nora's henchmen Camry and Cresta arrive to inform Haqua about their current task of interrupting Vintage's search party by placing Keima and Ayumi's puppets around the city then they give Keima and Chihiro celestial robes to make them invisible. Lune suddenly shows up, forcing Haqua to stay behind and confront her. As they run towards the seaside park, Chihiro tells Keima to become true to his feelings towards Ayumi and sneakily confiscates from him the guitar pick she gave to him. Keima arrives at the location of their marriage. Ayumi confesses to him it is her choice for falling in love with him and kisses him, bringing out Mercury. A winged Diana arrives to pick up Mercury and save their sisters. Akari and the Runaway Spirit Squad then show up to fight the Vintage. The Jupiter Sisters are saved, along with Keima's conquered girls, and destroy the gate, preventing Vintage's plan. Lune retreats after she fought Haqua. On the day of 2B Pencils and Kanon's performances, Chihiro witnesses the Jupiter Sisters while Keima laments the night that he rejected her feelings for him.
20	December 18, 2012	978-4-09-941806-9 (limited edition); 978-4-09-124037-8 (regular edition)
190. "Distant Thunder" (遠雷, "Enrai"); 191. "A Girl" (A GIRL, "A Gāru"); 192. "Hi-Ordinary" (Hi-日常, "Hinichijō"); 193. "Key" (KEY, "Kī"); 194. "Worry Bomb" (Worry Bomb, "Wōrī Bomu"); 195. "Beyond the Flag" (Beyond the FLAG, "Biyondo Za Furagu"); 196. "Child in Time" (Child in Time, "Chairudo In Taimu"); 197. "Steering Wheel" (操舵輪, "Sōdarin"); 198. "Fallen Devil" (Fallen Devil, "Fōrin Debiru"); 199. "Stop It" (STOP IT, "Sutoppu Itto"); 200. "New Order" (New Order, "Nyū Ōdā")
The Jupiter Sisters attend a slumber party to discuss who among their hosts will become Keima's lover while waiting for his return from a "journey". Five days after the goddess search, Mari returns home from her trip to South America and Keima comes out of his room to attend school after he confined himself in his room to play games. Tenri accompanies him on his way to school. As he tries to find out from Tenri how Diana brought out her wings, Keima is transported in a realm where he found a short-haired girl under a tree. While staying in Keima's house, Haqua receives a notice from New Hell about Dokurō Skull's reveal as the leader of Vintage. The newly-appointed head district chief Nora arrives and further explains that Dokurō Skull resisted her arrest, resulting in her death. Back in school, Keima is shocked to hear that Ayumi could not recognize him and the school became all-girls. Outside the premise, Diana sees a tremendous amount of miasma from his school. Meanwhile, Keima experiences alternate realities where the Jupiter Sisters' hosts were extremely possessive of him, he became part of a 2D game world, the school became all-boys, and Elsie tasked him to purge out runaway spirits from boys using love. Haqua and Nora arrive at his school to hand over him an orb that Dokurō Skull left behind for him to use as the "key" in saving the world. As he tries to exit the parallel worlds, Keima sees the future where the world got destroyed and encounters the short-haired girl who turned into a baby. Elsie, Haqua, Nora, and the Jupiter Sisters find Keima's unconscious body near the school's theater building as the source of the miasma. Upon inspection, Tenri tells the rest that he needed to go on a journey to the city's past 10 years ago. Once he wakes up, Tenri tells Keima to save the short-haired girl, and his rescue will affect everyone's future. Using the orb, the Jupiter Sisters send Keima and Elsie back to the past and his consciousness is placed in his ten-year-old body. They arrive in his old house and he bonds with his mother while pondering the reason behind their time travel. Meanwhile, the orb that Elsie held beams light in a certain direction. They follow it and arrive at the ship anchored in the seaside park. The orb opens a hatch inside the wheelhouse, where they found a table with two holes atop. Suddenly, they find the short-haired girl fell from the mast along with another orb and detect a runaway spirit from her. As he tries to communicate with the girl, Keima witnesses her becoming a baby. Back in the present, the Jupiter Sisters, who were in the middle of their slumber party, find that Keima failed in his mission. Keima returns to the same spot where they arrived after they traveled back in time, indicating the events repeat if he fails to save the girl. They arrive back at the ship and he tries to convince the girl to not commit suicide but he still fails to do so. Keima manages to learn her name is Dokurō before she turns back as a baby. On the next loop, he briefly meets ten-year-old Tenri before going back to the ship. He manages to save her from her suicidal thoughts by kissing her and telling her that he would do something about her despair.
21	April 16, 2013 (limited edition); April 18, 2013 (regular edition)	978-4-09-941815-1 (limited edition); 978-4-09-124198-6 (regular edition)
201. "A New Career in a New Flag" (A New Career in a New Flag, "A Nyū Kyaria In A Nyū Furagu"); 202. "Summer Sister" (サマーシスター, "Samā Shisutā"); 203. "There is a Will..." (There is a will..., "Zea Izu A Wiru"); 204. "A Caged Little Bird" (籠の中の小鳥, "Kago no Naka no Kotori"); 205. "Trick and Treat" (Trick and Treat, "Torikku Ando Torīto"); 206. "Adult's Prescription" (大人の処方箋, "Otona no Shohōsen"); 207. "Sorry to Disturb You Every Time" (毎度おさわがせします, "Maido Osawagaseshimasu"); 208. "A Game That Doesn't Want to Be Prohibited" (禁じられたくない遊び, "Kinjiraretakunai Asobi"); 209. "The Shiratori Household!" (白鳥家, "Shiratorike"); 210. "The Present Time Kanon 1" (The Present Time "Kanon"全編, "Za Purezento Taimu Kanon Zenpen"); 211. "The Present Time Kanon 2" (The Present Time "Kanon"後編, "Za Purezento Taimu Kanon Kōhen")
Despite saving Dokurō, Keima and Elsie are unable to return to the present. They find her body regressing but it returns to normal when he kissed her. Keima decides to live together with Dokurō to continue his mission of conquering her. He deduces that Dokurō Skull reincarnated as the current girl, based on Elsie's description of her supervisor. Keima teaches Dokurō how to eat breakfast and use a toilet, causing her to call him her big brother. He learns that two days from now there would be a summer camp he and Tenri would attend, which led to their discovery of a group of runaway spirits inside a cave. Back in the present, Haqua and Nora listen to the final message of Dokurō Skull before her death instructing them to protect the Jupiter Sisters at all cost because New Hell plans to capture them to be used for their fight against the ghosts of Old Hell. Back in the past, Keima attends elementary school and meets his classmate who behaved like an adult named Urara Shiratori. During class, he learns that the summer camp got canceled due to construction done by Shiratori Construction near the beach. Keima's orb suddenly beams a light towards her, suggesting she is his next mission to conquer. During swim class, Keima kisses Dokurō when her body began to regress while Urara witnesses them afar. Keima, Elsie, and Dokurō visit the construction site to know its goal and find Urara demanding its halt because the summer camp she secretly looked forward to gets canceled by it. He manages to befriend her by helping her to take revenge on her caretaker she hated named Yanagi and running around the site with her. Urara tells Keima about the secret she found in her grandfather's room, attracting his curiosity because it might be connected to the cause of the construction. It turns out to be a pornographic magazine that she wanted to read with him while hiding in the school's science laboratory. Keima begins to realize her surname is related to Shōtaro Shiratori, the owner of the land Maijima Academy built upon, whom he found on documents during his search of school history with Shiori in the library. Urara begins to imitate what they read in the magazine until they are found by their teacher. Yanagi fetches them to meet Urara's grandfather. It turns out that they planned the scandal to meet Shōtaro. They arrive at Shiratori household and visit her parents' grave while waiting for them to meet him. Keima finally meets the young-looking grandfather and deduces that he planned to construct a fortress to fend off devils. Back in the present, Vulcan explains Keima's body is possessed by his seven-year-old self from the past because the latter's body is currently inheld the seventeen-year-old consciousness. Apollo will first take care of his body according to the lottery the Jupiter Sisters made. The seven-year-old Keima wakes up inside Kanon's dressing room. To cover up his childish behavior, Apollo tells Kanon he experiences amnesia. She brings him to a game shop, the school, and the rooftop where they first met to help him remember her but her time is up when Yui arrived to take care of seven-year-old Keima next.
22	June 18, 2013	978-4-09-941814-4 (limited edition); 978-4-09-124321-8 (regular edition)
212. "Flashpoint"; 213. "Alarm a la Mode"; 214. "Until Today and Since Yesterday" (今日までそして昨日から, Kyō Made Soshite Kinō Kara); 215. "Turbulent Laws of Cause and Effect" (因果律タービュランス, Ingaritsu Tābyuransu); 216. "E.T."; 217. "Space is Big Trouble" (宇宙は大へんだ, Uchū wa Taihen da); 218. "The Ghost" (亡霊, Bōrei); 219. "Ooh La La"; 220. "The Present Time Yui"; 221. "The Pleasure Land"; 222. "Owner of a LONELY HEART"
Shōtaro confirms Keima's hunch about the fortress. During their conversation, the construction site is attacked by Vintage. He renders Keima unconscious to keep him away from danger. Shōtaro then heads to the site and finds his hired soldiers dead. A Vintage operative finds Keima when Elsie and Dokurō showed up to look for him. Elsie manages to defeat the operative. They arrive at the site and find a wounded Shōtaro, who revealed his grudge against devils for killing his children. Vintage members suddenly show up but Dokurō kisses Keima to proceed in defeating them with her superhuman strength. Dokurō wants to avoid death so she sends him back to the time when he saved her from suicide. She still retains the previous memory and requests him to save Shōtaro and the others. Dokurō explains to Keima her desire to have the peaceful future where he came from. Keima mentions time paradox but she states that their current timeline would serve as the present to create a new future. Keima and Dokurō arrive at Shiratori estate to befriend Urara again by pretending to be an alien who crash-landed on Earth. Urara agrees to help him and brings young Mio and Yui, both her friends, to assist him. They manage to bring him inside Urara's room to hide him. Keima then eavesdrops on their parents' conversation about the construction site and learns that Shoōtaro's daughter got possessed by a runaway spirit, hence his grudge against devils. Dokurō visits the grave of Urara's parents while Yanagi finds him and recognizes him as Urara's classmate. After he talked with Mio and Yui's fathers, Shōtaro tells Urara the summer camp will be postponed. As he tries to get away from Yanagi, Keima suddenly sees a grown-up Urara. Dokurō arrives and informs him a hole is opened on the grave, indicating a runaway spirit from Urara's mother escapes and possesses Urara. Keima instructs Dokurō to pick up Elsie and Shōtaro as part of his conquest of Urara then he accompanies her while she enjoys being an adult. Dokurō picks up Shōtaro when a ghost of his daughter named Kayoko suddenly showed up. Back in the present, Yui struggles to communicate with the seven-year-old Keima because he keeps on playing games but she manages to help him complete them when her mother and her bodyguards caused a power interruption. In the end, the seven-year-old Keima sees her as a man due to her male school uniform outfit while he appreciates her help. Back in the past, Keima accompanies Urara inside a virtual amusement park she created. On the other hand, Kayoko blames Shōtaro for keeping her isolated all this time and detects a gap in Urara's heart due to her loneliness. She then appears in front of her daughter and prevents Keima from approaching them as the two enjoy the park together. Dokurō and Shōtaro arrive at Keima's location after they evaded the ghost's attacks. The bonding between the mother and daughter gets interrupted when Shōtaro showed up in front of them, causing Kayoko to attack him. Urara becomes mad at her and proceeds to defeat her while mentioning how she would like to become an adult to help her grandfather whom she felt his loneliness instead of her. Shōtaro pacifies her and tells her to not rush to become an adult because he will enjoy her childhood together. They then make peace with Kayoko as the virtual amusement park collapses.
23	September 18, 2013	978-4-09-124381-2
223. "Boy Meets Chief"; 224. "Twice in a Lifetime"; 225. "Cooperation"; 226. "No Man's Land"; 227. "The Legend of A Hero Without a Cause" (無目的救世主伝説, Mumokuteki Kyūseishu Densetsu); 228. "On-Air Queen Battle"; 229. "You Are More Beautiful Than A Rose" (君はバラより美しい, Kimi wa Bara Yori Utsukushii); 230. "Close to You"; 231. "Evil Angel"; 232. "The Present Time Shiori & Tsukiyo"; 233. "Raising the Curtain" (開幕, Kaimaku)
Keima and Dokurō head first on the ship docked on the seaside park before going back to Shiratori estate. Using their glowing orbs, they communicate with Dokurō Skull who instructed Keima to protect the Jupiter Sisters from a secret society within New Hell called "Satyr". He realizes his arrival in the past means he is preparing for his future conquest. Keima and Dokurō then visit Shōtaro to request him to call off the construction and resume the summer camp to make way for the arrival of the Jupiter Sisters, which he happily obliged. They return to school filled with miasma and find the boys being imprisoned by girls who took over the place. Elsie saves Keima from pursuing girls and explains they have numbers on their hands to indicate their popularity ranking. He saves Tenri from bullying girls and finds her hand with no numbers. Outside the school, Dokurō makes contact with Keima to relay the message from Dokurō Skull about Vintage's plan to use the girls as hosts for the runaway spirits. To control the situation, Keima plans to make Tenri the queen of the school. With Elsie's celestial robe, Tenri defeats a third-grader with brute strength named Arita and takes her number 10 spot. This causes her to have a conflict with the comedic duo called "C-Dash" for the same ranking. Keima disguises himself as a girl and teams up with her to defeat them in the comedy contest. He then challenges the girls for a queen contest with voting to take place during the summer camp. Keima helps Tenri win the adorability contest against a six-grader student and model named Hana who ranked 7. He meets the rank 1 named Kaori Yūzaki and instructs Elsie to follow her. She then finds unconscious girls with "reserved" Hellian tags on them and encounters a Vintage member putting a collar around their necks. In front of the board with the names of participants for the queen contest, Keima finds Ayumi on the list while Tenri is lured out by an imposter of him. Kaori converses with Keima about how she caused the chaos in the school because of the deal she made with Vintage to offer them human sacrifices in exchange for them giving her control over the city. Meanwhile, Tenri runs away from the imposter who was revealed to be under Kaori's instruction to accompany her for ten minutes while she talks with Keima. Back in the present, Shiori and Tsukiyo find ways to make the others start a conversation as they wait outside Yui's manor for seven-year-old Keima to come out. Back in the past, Keima plans to conquer Kaori by challenging her for the number 1 spot. After he and Tenri won the limbo dancing contest to defeat the rank 5, Keima invites Kaori for a duel when a giant timer orb appeared at the top of the school building.
24	December 18, 2013	978-4-09-159172-2 (limited edition); 978-4-09-124511-3 (regular edition)
234. "Noise at the Top" (頂上発止, Chōjō Hasshi); 235. "Girls Talk"; 236. "Love is a Smoke"; 237. "Romeo's Cloudy Skies"; 238. "Smiles and Villains"; 239. "Not to be"; 240. "The Present Time Tsukiyo & Shiori"; 241. "Love's Labour's Lost"; 242. "Tempest"; 243. "Love's not Time's Fool"; 244. "Much Ado About "Something""
On top of the school building, Kaori explains to Keima the timer orb will open the gaps in girls' hearts once it reaches zero. He tells her the plan will fail but he will protect her from Vintage. Kaori makes her move by telling Tenri, whom she followed inside a restroom using the perfume she sprayed on her, about how Keima rejected her and his plan to marry her instead. Kaori decides to hold a Romeo and Juliet play instead of participating in the queen contest. With Elsie's help, Keima provokes her using a fake psychic ability while they are by the swimming pool. He and Tenri begin to practice the play inside the school's gym alongside Kaori's class. Kaori tells her followers to support Tenri's love affection for Keima. During their practice, Keima and Tenri discover they need to kiss at the end of the play, causing him to visit Kaori to object. Tenri follows him and sees him and Kaori sharing a kiss, which turned out to be Kaori's doing. Kaori notices her watching them and tells her Keima is not in love with her, causing Tenri to run away. Keima follows her to try to uplift her but he decides to not involve her anymore with his plan and walks away, which turned out to be a ruse to make her be worried at him as part of his ongoing conquest. He later bumps into young Ayumi and Chihiro, causing him to become depressed because he remembers his time with them in the future. Meanwhile, Tenri decides to look for Keima but she is unable to find him on the rooftop where Elsie said he will be at per his instruction. Back in the present, Shiori and Tsukiyo gaze on the moon while taking care of seven-year-old Keima when the former invited the latter to investigate the Jupiter Sisters. Meanwhile, a member of the Public Safety Department spies on them but Ayumi unknowingly bumps into her. Back in the past, Tenri finds Kaori outside the room, where Keima hid and planned to go back in time to get away from the current one, talking about an ideal world but he tells her they are real idiots, causing her to become furious and attempt to enter the closed room. Elsie and Tenri manage to stop her and upon her leaving the place, find the room collapsing through spacetime. Keima tells them he will find a different route where he would shoulder the burden by himself but Tenri chases him to talk with him. She agrees to help him with his terrible tasks. They are saved by Elsie before they are sent back in time. They return inside the gym to prepare for the Romeo and Juliet play when Elsie informed Keima about collars around the victims' necks, causing him to instruct her to bring Ayumi to Dokurō because he sees a collar around her neck as well. Keima and Tenri perform the play but he acts as a time traveler instead.
25	March 18, 2014	978-4-09-159189-0 (limited edition); 978-4-09-124579-3 (regular edition)
245. "As You Like"; 246. "Nicely Tangled Threads, Badly Tangled Threads" (良い縒り糸、悪い縒り糸, Yoi Yori Ito, Warui Yori Ito); 247. "The Taming of the Shrew" (じゃじゃ馬ならし, Yoi Yori Ito, Warui Yori Ito); 248. "The Better for My Enemy"; 249. "A Settlement"; 250. "A Settlement 2"; 251. "A Settlement 3"; 252. "The Present Time Ayumi"; 253. "All Together Flag"; 254. "To the Destiny"; 255. "A Settlement 4"; 256. "From Beyond"
Keima's version of Romeo and Juliet changes into a sci-fi setting. During the act, Tenri reads a note telling her that he came from the future and instructing her of his plans for tomorrow's summer camp. Kaori plans to sabotage their performance but Vintage abducts her. Elsie manages to acquire Vintage's collar tagging device. She uses it to replicate collars that she would place on dummies while she saves the targets with actual collars to fool Vintage. Dokurō joins Keima and Tenri in saving Kaori. Inside a room, Kaori demands Keima to remove the collar or else she will reveal his plan to Vintage. He scolds her for her view of happiness by sacrificing other people and pretends to be an ally of Vintage. They left her but the collar around her neck is successfully removed without her knowing it. The timer orb reaches zero but Vintage's plan is already thwarted, saving the school and returning everyone to normal. Later night, Dokurō says goodbye to Keima but she brings him back to the ship anchored on the seaside park to give him instruction on how he could return to his original timeline. She wraps a collar around her neck, causing Keima to discover she is Yuri in the future. Dokurō explains she will serve as a decoy for girls for Vintage to target her instead of them and hands him over a machine that could open gaps in girls' hearts. The following day, Keima asks Shōtaro, who visited the cave, for a favor then he and Tenri explore the area. He tells her that he would open gaps in the hearts of girls whom he conquered in the future as his final task upon arriving in the past. Back in the present, Ayumi joins Shiori and Tsukiyo inside the school's library to investigate the history of Maijima City while taking care of seven-year-old Keima when a Colossus attacked the place. Shōtaro arrives to save them and brings them to his estate. He instructs Yanagi to pick up Yui and Kanon. Shōtaro explains that their powers were needed to bring back seventeen-year-old Keima. Meanwhile, Dokurō/Yuri instructs Haqua to return to New Hell. She then brings Tenri to Shiratori estate. Back in the past, Keima and Tenri exit the cave and meet up with Shōtaro who gave him a list of the future hosts of Jupiter Sisters. Elsie returns after she clashed with Akari, who turned out to be her "big sister" in an orphanage. She reveals that her parents died during the war in Hell but she is already happy to be part of the Katsuragi household. Back in the present, Tenri tells the rest about the note that Keima gave to her during their Romeo and Juliet play. Meanwhile, Lune discovers the wheelhouse containing a table for two orbs as Keima from the past waits for either Dokurō/Yuri or the Jupiter Sisters to do something for his return in the proper timeline.
26	June 18, 2014	978-4-09-159193-7 (limited edition); 978-4-09-124666-0 (regular edition)
257. "Under Cover of the Night"; 258. "Let's Spend the Night Together"; 259. "Shattered"; 260. "Paint It Blank"; 261. "No Expectations"; 262. "Heart of Stone"; 263. "You Can't Always Get What You Want"; 264. "Shine a Light"; 265. "World Fortune"; 266. "Romantic ☆ 2Night"; 267. "A Token of Love"; 268. "Door to Tomorrow"
Dokurō/Yuri attacks Lune but she struggles to defeat her, alerting Shōtaro to escape his estate along with seven-year-old Keima and the Jupiter Sisters' hosts and head towards the ship docked at the seaside park. Haqua and Nora encounter Akari, who explained Satyr's scheme to resurrect a "weapon". Meanwhile, Dokurō/Yuri manages to defeat Lune but the Colossi appear and destroy the ship when the magical barrier that covered the wheelhouse vanished. This results in the gateway between the past and the future being destroyed and Keima unable to return. Suddenly, Tenri is left alone in a colorless and formless world but she finds her fellow Jupiter Sisters' hosts and an unconscious seven-year-old Keima. Vulcan then instructs the girls to lend her their powers to reconstruct the destroyed orb. Back in the past, Keima's time freezes and Elsie disappears. His time resumes and he manages to make contact with the Jupiter Sisters' hosts from the future. Ayumi decides not to help him but Tenri tells her Keima is on a mission to open a gap in her heart and gives her the notes she received from him ten years ago. Back in the past, he starts to visit the Jupiter Sisters' hosts, starting with young Ayumi, but he encounters young Chihiro instead. He finally completes his final task by placing collar tags around their necks. Keima returns to the ship and instructs the Jupiter Sisters' hosts from the future to summon him back. They return to the moment Colossi destroyed the ship, indicating the past and future successfully connected, and the seven-year-old and seventeen-year-old Keima's are returned to their corresponding timelines. The Jupiter Sisters defeat them but they find Keima still unconscious. He appears in a dream world and finds Elsie, who was revealed to be the final "boss" and Satyr's weapon. She finds her life upon being resurrected by Dokurō Skull and sent to the human world fulfilling. Before the dream world completely collapses, Elsie requests Keima to accept her as his real sister. Keima agrees and is released from the contract he signed from the beginning. The next day, Haqua and Nora discuss over breakfast how Satyr's plan got foiled but they show no sign of remembering Elsie. It turns out Elsie reincarnated as Eri Katsuragi to officially become Keima's younger sister, thus disassociating herself to New Hell. Keima visits Chihiro to confess his feelings for her. He meets up with Dokurō/Yuri, who returned his game consoles she confiscated and told him her plan to quit teaching. She assures him that his feelings reached Chihiro and leaves him after she thanked him for being her big brother. The Jupiter Sisters' hosts return to their normal lives with lingering feelings for Keima. Meanwhile, Tenri converses with Diana about how she knew it all along with his plan to confess to Chihiro since it is included in the notes she received from him ten years ago but she still has a little hope for her feelings to reach him. Diana assures she will stay by her side until she finds happiness as they look forward to their future.

== See also ==
- List of The World God Only Knows characters
- List of The World God Only Knows episodes
