= Kim Young-oh =

South Korean manhwa writer (born 1976)

Kim Young-oh 김영오
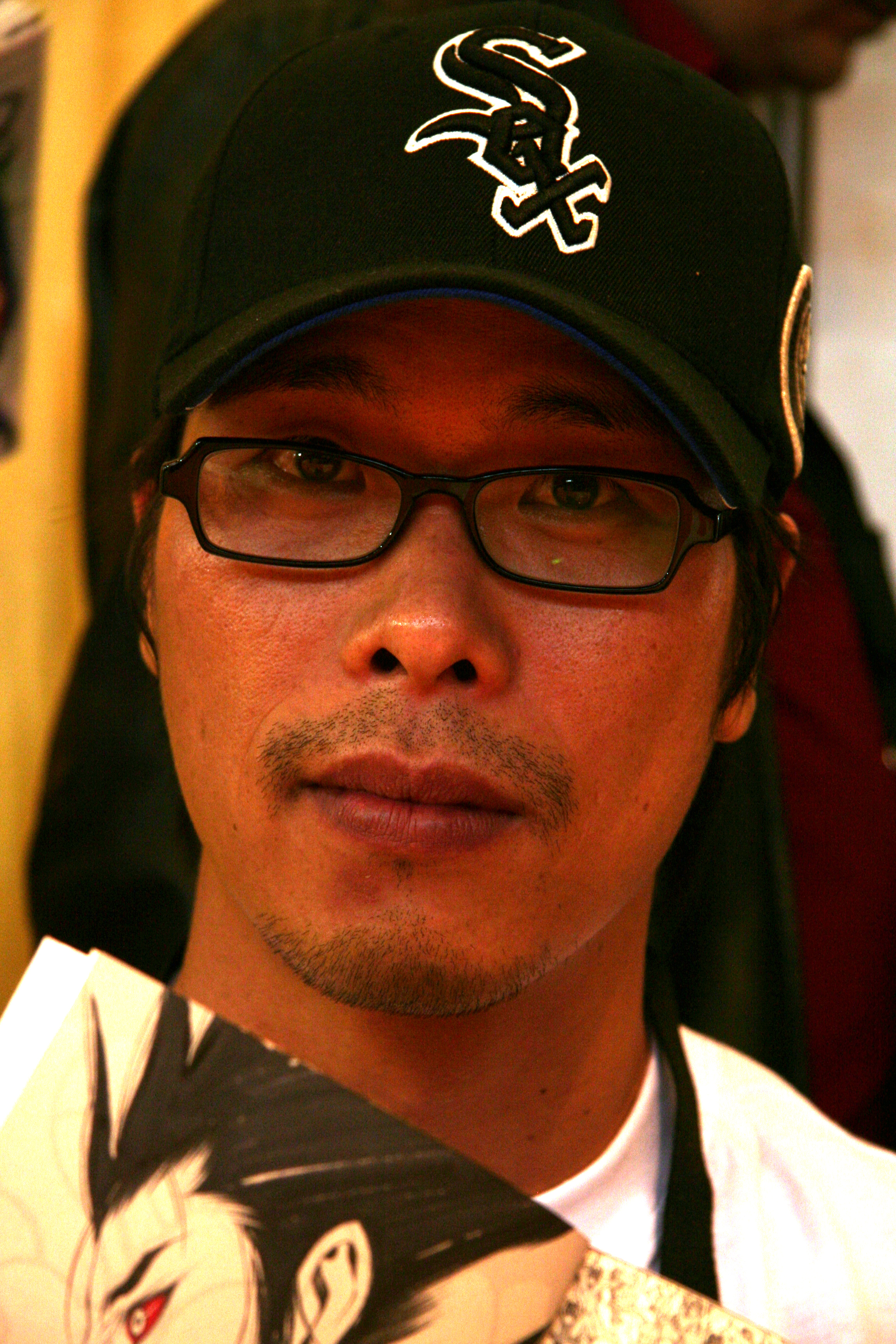
- Kim at Japan Expo in 2007
- Born: 1976 (age 49–50)
- Areas: Writer, Artist
- Notable works: Banya: The Explosive Delivery Man

Korean name
- Hangul: 김영오
- Hanja: 金榮五
- RR: Gim Yeongo
- MR: Kim Yŏngo

Kim Young-oh (Korean: 김영오; born 1976) is a South Korean manhwa writer and illustrator. He is best-known for creating Banya: The Explosive Delivery Man, which was published in five volumes from 2004 to 2006.

== Biography ==
Kim was born in South Korea in 1976. Growing up, Kim was fond of drawing and drew comics to earn some money. He decided to draw comics professionally after winning a competition. His first full-length work, Bal Jak, written by Sang Young Jeon, began serialization in Haksan Publishing's magazine Booking in 2000. It was completed in 2004 with 12 volumes.

Kim's next series, Banya: The Explosive Delivery Man, was also serialized in Booking. Its individual chapters were collected into five volumes, which were published from August 11, 2004, to March 6, 2006. His next work, Gui, written by Orebalgum, was serialized in Booking and published in five volumes from 2006 to 2008.

== Influences ==
Kim likes to draw action comics in a martial arts or heroic fantasy setting. When illustrating, he does not pay too much attention to small details and instead prefers to follow the action scenes. Kim has cited both manga and American comics as sources of inspiration, particularly Vagabond, Hellboy, and Spawn.

== Works ==
- Bal Jak (발작) (2000–2004; written by Sang Young Jeon)
- Banya: The Explosive Delivery Man (폭주배달부 반야) (2004–2006)
- Gui (귀) (2006–2008; written by Orebalgum)
