= Veritas (manhwa) =

Manhwa by Kim Dong-hoon and Yoon Joon-shik

- First volume of Veritas, released in Korea.

베리타스 RR: Beritaseu MR: Perit'asŭ
- Genre: Action, Martial arts
- Author: Yoon Joon-sik [윤준식]
- Illustrator: Kim Dong-hoon [김동훈]
- Publisher: Haksan Publishing
- Magazine: Booking (manhwa)
- Original run: 2005–2010
- Collected volumes: 10

Veritas (Korean: 베리타스) is a manhwa written by Yoon Joon-shik (윤준식) and illustrated by Kim Dong-hoon (김동훈). Its first chapter was released in 2005, and it was produced until 2010. The story is of a middle-schooler named Gangryong Ma, who is saved one day by a remarkably strong man, Lightning Tiger, who becomes his master, and teaches him a martial art known as the Enlightenment Of Thunder and Lightning (or EOTL), thereby introducing him to a world of power that will change his life forever.

== Plot ==
Gangryong Ma was the boss of his middle school, getting in fistfights almost every day. He thought that winning those fistfights was what it meant to be strong. That all ended when he met Lightning Tiger, a man whose power dwarfed that of any man Gangryong had ever met before. After arguing, begging, and jumping through hoops for a year to prove his loyalty, Gangryong convinced Lightning Tiger to be his master.

For two months, Lightning Tiger taught Gangryong the secret of ki manipulation by way of the Enlightenment Of Thunder and Lightning (EOTL), a traditional Korean martial art passed on through the centuries to one student at a time. By properly refining and focusing his Ki, Gangryong learned not only to increase his overall physical strength, but he gained the ability to create devastatingly powerful lightning attacks. When the two months were up, Lightning Tiger left Gangryong, warning him of an inevitable battle against a strong enemy and hoping that they might one day see each other.

Months later, Gangryong was approached by an ominous group of men. He was presented with a box, and was told that it contained the arm of Lightning Tiger, whom they had supposedly killed. These men were from Reunion, a multinational organization whose main goals were the collection, evolution and eventual perfection of traditional martial arts and the creation of artificial ki, or natural energy, which could be used to make people more powerful. They forced Gangryong to enter a special school designed to train suitable fighters in the fighting styles that had been collected and created by Reunion.

Now, within Reunion, Gangryong finds himself a flash-point for controversy. As student of a sworn enemy of Reunion, there are many who want him dead. As the sole practitioner of EOTL, there are many who desire to see his success, so that they may use his techniques. All the while, Gangryong must work to uncover the secrets in the training he was given, so that he may achieve the power he seeks, and finally avenge the presumed deceased Lightning Tiger.
