= Banya: The Explosive Delivery Man =

South Korean manhwa series

- Cover of the first volume

^폭주배달부 ^반야
- Genre: Action/adventure
- Author: Kim Young-oh
- Publisher: Haksan Publishing
- English publisher: NA: Dark Horse Comics
- Magazine: Booking
- Original run: August 11, 2004 – March 6, 2006
- Collected volumes: 5

Banya: The Explosive Delivery Man (Korean: 폭주배달부 반야; lit. 'Hell's Angel Delivery Man Banya') is a South Korean manhwa series written and illustrated by Kim Young-oh. It was serialized in Haksan Publishing's magazine Booking and published in five volumes from August 2004 to March 2006.

== Plot ==
With a widespread war raging between humans and the monstrous Torren, the young delivery men of the Gaya Desert Post Office do not pledge allegiance to any country or king. They are banded together by the pledge to deliver "Fast. Precise. Secure." Throughout a variety of missions and adventures in the face of overwhelming odds, it is Banya's ingenuity, flexibility and resourcefulness that carries them to successful outcomes.

== Publication ==
Written and illustrated by Kim Young-oh, the series was serialized in Haksan Publishing's magazine Booking. Its individual chapters were collected into five volumes, which were published from August 11, 2004, to March 6, 2006.

At Sakura-Con 2006, Dark Horse Comics announced that they licensed the series for English publication.

=== Volumes ===
No.	Original release date	Original ISBN	English release date	English ISBN
1	August 11, 2004	978-8-95-295881-5	September 20, 2006	978-1-59-307614-6
1. A Man With a Job; 2. Boy and Girl; 3. The Messenger; 4. Trackers; 5. Separation; 6. Gorigon Woods
Banya agrees to complete a wounded soldier's mission to transport a parcel of great importance.
2	January 10, 2005	978-8-95-296377-2	December 20, 2006	978-1-59-307688-7
7. Mei's Rescue, Part 1; 8. Mei's Rescue, Part 2; 9. Work Accomplished!; 10. Motherhood, Part 1; 11. Motherhood, Part 2; 12. Motherhood, Part 3; 13. Indomitable
Young Kong, Banya's offsider, is entrusted with a delivery of great importance, and Banya schemes to free Mei from her captors, setting monsters against each other. Transporting a rare artifact or reuniting a mother with her long-lost son, Banya speeds through war-torn deserts and mysterious forests, relying on flexibility, daring and wits to complete his missions.
3	May 10, 2005	978-8-95-296840-1	March 14, 2007	978-1-59-307705-1
14. In the Heart of the Mountains; 15. Battle at Chamhwe Temple; 16. The Breaking of the Seal; 17. Return of the Summoned; 18. A Kid Named Mido; 19. The Road Home; 20. Save Mido!; 21. Awakening
The delivery crew find themselves in the middle of a mysterious dispute at the heart of a sacred temple, trapped between devout warrior-priests and the vicious, ruthless Torren.
4	November 14, 2005	978-8-95-297364-1	June 20, 2007	978-1-59-307774-7
22. People from the Past, Part 1; 23. People from the Past, Part 2; 24. Crossroads of Fate; 25. Attack, Part 1; 26. Attack, Part 2; 27. To Protect; 28. Omen; 29. Man and Sword; 30. Company
Banya is enraged and frustrated by the events of the last volume. The desert deliverymen are in serious danger in a desert on the brink of an outbreak of violence as Banya fights off more monsters.
5	March 6, 2006	978-8-95-298171-4	September 19, 2007	978-1-59-307841-6
31. Omens; 32. Crisis; 33. Hard Journey; 34. Entrance to the Black Mountain; 35. Reunion; 36. Attacker; 37. Awakening; 38. Truth of the Dragon
Banya delivers his most important "package" — the powerful summoner Jiahn — to the "Land of Death". Jiahn must reach her destination before an extraordinary evil is unleashed upon Gaya, but is opposed by a vicious pack of warriors and monsters, led by the villain Kamutu. Banya has lost his memory and the tension lies in what he will choose when he regains it: to join Kamutu or return to his friends at the Gaya Desert Post Office.

== Reception ==
Jarred Pine of Mania felt the story was similar to those from Shōnen manga. He compared the artwork to the works of Takehiko Inoue. Katherine Dacey of Pop Culture Shock also praised the story and artwork, describing the former as "a cross between Dune, Mad Max, and Lord of the Rings".
