= Jack Frost (manhwa) =

2005–2014 manwha by Jinho Ko

- Cover of the Yen Press edition of Jack Frost vol. 1 (2009), art by Jinho Ko

잭 프로스트 Jaek Peuroseuteu
- Genre: Action/adventure, horror, humor/comedy
- Author: Jinho Ko
- Publisher: Haksan Culture Company (South Korea)
- English publisher: Yen Press (U.S.)
- Magazine: Booking (South Korea); Yen Plus (U.S.)
- Original run: 2005–2014
- Collected volumes: 11

Jack Frost (잭 프로스트) is a complete manhwa series by Jinho Ko (고진호). In May 2009, the first volume of Jack Frost was released by Yen Press in English.

== Plot ==
Jack Frost follows the story of Noh-A Joo, the new student at Amityville High School. Things start off rather poorly for Noh-A as she quickly comes to realize that the school is not as it appears. Caught in an interschool war between vampires, monsters, and other creatures, she must quickly learn what her new role is as the "mirror image," and how to handle the mysterious Jack Frost.

What is known about Amityville; There have been 13 wars/classes, only Jack survived the latest. There are 4 districts North, East, South, West, and of them, North is smallest. The combined population of the four districts is equal to a country in the living world. Those who come there are removed from the karmic cycle of death and rebirth, thus death is truly final there with no hope of any reincarnation or afterlife. There have been multiple statements hinting that the mirror image is somehow able to change this.

=== Characters ===
Noh-A Joo

Noha-A Joo is a new student at Amityville High School. She is known as a "mirror-image"; a person who has died but becomes immortal. Her blood has the ability to heal wounds. Noh-A is excited to learn that she is a mirror image, and does not show any signs of unhappiness at her new role in Amityville. She is quite naive and manages, somehow, to get her head cut off several times, usually by Jack.

Jack Frost

Jack Frost is a sinister and mysterious student. He is able to inflict and withstand large amounts of damage, and is shown to be a skilled and legendary fighter. Jack declares himself to be both the strongest in Amityville and the death incarnate that nothing can kill. Helmina has stated that he is able to continuously kill, and then just smile.

He appears to be in some way tied to Noh-A, through a doll given to her by her father (presumably before he was killed), who also bears the same name. He was asked by Helmina to protect the mirror image, and even to 'take her as a lover', though he declines, still wearing his smile. Jack declares that the mirror image is just a tool and, in the English version, says she should concern herself with his "home work." Noh-A nicknames him Nasty-Smile or Smirky, due to not knowing his name throughout the first few scenes. His smile seems too wide for his face. He seems to respect, though slightly indifferently, Helmina and treats everyone else as inferior.

An interesting point is his full length coat, which is torn and shredded at the edges. This appears to heal his body when he is injured as well as rebuild itself. Also, his main weaponry is his lightning fast reactions, and also blades and armored gauntlets which appear from his lower arms. In Violence 14 it is revealed that the coat is called Devil Thread and once belonged one of the "Immortalizer" Ji-Hon

Hansen

Hansen is the former Head Guidance Counselor of the West District. He originally went to the North District to kill Jack, but was defeated and joined the North District afterwards. Hansen wields a gun with a cross emblazoned on it that fires silver bullets, which he says is the only weapon able to kill a vampire zombie or return it to a zombie or human. He claims to know much about vampires because he was saved from one. When he first joined the North District, Hansen was assigned to perform cleaning and maintenance, though he wasn't very apt.

According to Hansen himself, he likes his women with glasses, long hair and "a voluptuous body", to which Helmina fits the bill.

Helmina

Helmina is a tall woman and Head of the North District. She appears to know secrets about Jack and often acts sadistically towards him and others. She is shown to have a huge flower garden growing on the graves of students.

Jin

Jin is the Nurse of the North District and the first person Noh-A befriends after being beheaded. Jin is the only teacher to have been replaced after a fire several years ago. She displays the ability to hack into and control the school. She has a calm and quiet demeanor, is very efficient with her work and is able to "repair" almost any injury.

Avid

Avid, also known as "Blood Pirate Avid", is a treasure-hunting vampire. Avid came from the South District to drink the blood of Noh-A, but soon after seeks Jack's blood. Avid bites Jack and briefly controls him using fear, but Jack breaks through the commands and decapitates him. Afterward, Avid is still alive and a black wings sprout from his eyepatch (which has the symbol of a wing on it), flying him away.

Lucy

Lucy used to be a 'meal' (zombie) under the control of Avid but was saved by Hansen. She is neither a living object nor human. She follows Hansen's every will, but clings to him constantly.

Chief Teacher

The skeletal remains of a teacher brought to life by Helmina. He wears a black, hooded cloak and is often seen sweeping the floor with a broom.

== Reception ==
Jack Frost has received mixed reviews among Western critics. PopCultureShock's Ken Haley graded Jack Frost with a B−, praising the illustrations as "slick and stylish", but criticizing the characters as being "almost all one-note". Snow Wildsmith of School Library Journal reviewed the chapter placed in Yen Press's Yen Plus magazine She criticised it as having not "much plot to tie it together", and that the "combination of fan service and gruesome decapitations" made reading "uncomfortable".

== See also ==
- List of Jack Frost chapters
