= XS (manhwa) =

South Korean manhwa series

XS엑세스
- Genre: science fiction
- Author: Song Ji-Hyung
- Publisher: Haksan
- English publisher: Dark Horse
- Magazine: Booking
- Collected volumes: 5

XS (Korean: XS엑세스) is a manhwa by Song Ji-hyung (송지형) that was serialized in Booking by the Haksan Culture Company and licensed by Dark Horse Comics.

== Volumes ==
No.	Title	Original release date	English release date
1	Hybrid	September 2003; 9788952945853	June 6, 2007; 978-1-59307-628-3
2	Angel Virus	January 2004; 9788952949905	September 5, 2007; 978-1-59307-757-0
3	Guardian	May 2004; 9788952955333	December 5, 2007; 978-1-59307-758-7
4	Disillusion	August 25, 2004; 9788952958792	
5	Decent of Goddess	December 25, 2004; 9788952963765	
