= List of Fairy Tail chapters (volumes 16–30) =

The cover of the sixteenth volume of Fairy Tail as published by Kodansha on July 17, 2009, in Japan

Fairy Tail is a Japanese manga series written and illustrated by Hiro Mashima that has been translated into various languages and spawned a substantial media franchise. The series follows the adventures of the dragon-slayer Natsu Dragneel, as he is searching for the dragon Igneel and partners with seventeen-year-old celestial wizard Lucy Heartfilia, who joins the titular guild. In Japan, the series has been published by Kodansha in Weekly Shōnen Magazine since the magazine's issue of August 23, 2006, and in tankōbon format since December 15, 2006. Fairy Tail has 63 volumes and 545 chapters.

In North America, Kodansha USA and Random House currently publishes its English language adaptation of the series. The English-language adaptation was originally published by the now-defunct Del Rey Manga beginning in March 2008 and ending with their 12th volume in September 2010. Since then, Kodansha USA and Random House replaced Del Ray with the 13th volume in May 2011, reprinting the earlier 12 volumes under their name, and also publishes them digitally. In Australia and New Zealand, the English volumes are distributed by Random House Australia. All 63 English volumes have been released.

== Volume list ==
No.	Original release date	Original ISBN	North American release date	North American ISBN
16	July 17, 2009	978-4-06-384158-9	November 8, 2011	978-1-935429-35-7
127. "Sacrifice for Justice" (涙を揮って馬謖を斬る, Namida o Furutte Bashoku o Kiru); 128. "Fantasia" (幻想曲(ファンタジア), Fantajia); 129. "Even So, I..." (それでも あたしが・・・・, Soredemo, Atashi ga....); 130. "Love & Lucky"; 131. "Nirvana" (ニルヴァーナ, Niruvāna); 132. "Allies, Unite!" (連合軍、集結!, Rengōgun, Shūketsu!); 133. "12 vs. 6" (12対6, Jū-ni Tai Roku); 134. "Oración Seis Appears!" (六魔将軍(オラシオンセイス)現る, Orashion Seisu Arawaru)
Makarov Dreyar is brought back to full health thanks to his healer, Porlyusica, and expels Laxus from Fairy Tail for his actions. During the Fantasia parade, he and the rest of the guild bid Laxus farewell, indicating that they will always look over him. Later, Lucy Heartfilia meets with her father Jude, who has lost his company and fortune. Lucy initially refuses to forgive him, but reconciles with him after fighting off a dark guild that takes his new workplace hostage. Afterwards, Fairy Tail organizes an alliance with other official guilds to stop the Oración Seis, one of Fiore's strongest dark guilds, from activating the ancient destructive spell Nirvana. Natsu Dragneel, Lucy, Happy, Gray Fullbuster, and Erza Scarlet are chosen to represent their guild and meet with the other guilds: Blue Pegasus, represented by Ichiya Vandalay Kotobuki and the Tri-men; Lamia Scale, represented by Jura Neekis and two of Gray's nemeses, Lyon Vastia and Sherry Blendy; and Cait Shelter, represented by the young Wendy Marvell and her cat partner, Carla. Before they can take action, the alliance is ambushed and overpowered by the Oración Seis.
17	September 17, 2009	978-4-06-384185-5	January 24, 2012	978-1-61262-054-1
135. "Priestess of the Sky" (天空の巫女, Tenkū no Miko); 136. "Coffin" (棺桶, Kan'oke); 137. "The Girl and the Ghost" (少女と亡霊, Shōjo to Bōrei); 138. "Didn't Count On..." (計算外, Keisan-gai); 139. "Dead Grand Prix" (デッドGP(グランプリ), Deddo Guran Puri); 140. "Slow Speed World" (低速の世界, Teisoku no Sekai); 141. "Light" (ヒカリ, Hikari); 142. "Darkness" (闇, Yami); 143. "Celestial Spirit Brawl" (星霊合戦, Seirei Gassen)
The Oración Seis' leader, Brain, forces Wendy to use her Sky Dragon Slayer magic to revive Brain's former student and Natsu's old nemesis, Jellal Fernandez, who has the ability to find and unseal Nirvana. Wendy recognizes Jellal as someone she is indebted to and, despite learning of his villainous actions, reluctantly complies. Natsu arrives to rescue her and Happy, and brings Wendy to heal a poisoned Erza. Meanwhile, Gray and Lyon battle and defeat Oración Seis member Racer, but Lyon is seemingly killed in the attempt. Jellal unseals Nirvana around this time, leading it to take its effect of inverting the good and evil emotions within people: Sherry turns evil in her despair towards Lyon's apparent death and tries to kill Gray, while the Oración Seis' Hoteye turns good after questioning his own motives and befriends Jura. Natsu tries to stop Jellal him from meeting Erza, only to fall into a trap set by the Oración Seis' celestial wizard Angel, who battles Lucy.
18	November 17, 2009	978-4-06-384211-1	March 6, 2012	978-1-61262-055-8
144. "Pretty Voice" (きれいな声, Kireina Koe); 145. "Memories of Jellal" (追憶のジェラール, Tsuioku no Jerāru); 146. "You Are Free" (君は自由だ, Kimi wa Jiyū da); 147. "Guild of Hope" (希望のギルド, Kibō no Girudo); 148. "March of Destruction" (破滅の行進, Hametsu no Kōshin); 149. "The Super Aerial Battle!! Natsu vs. Cobra" (超空中戦!! ナツ vs. コブラ, Chōkūchūsen!! Natsu vs. Kobura); 150. "Dragon's Roar" (ドラゴンの咆哮, Doragon no Hōkō); 151. "Annihilation of Six Demons?!" (六魔壊滅！？, Rokuma Kaimetsu!?); 152. "Jura of the Ten Saints" (聖十のジュラ, Seiten no Jura)
With help from the Tri-men's Hibiki Lates, Lucy defeats Angel. Erza finds Jellal and discovers he cannot remember anything but her name and Nirvana's location. After Erza reminds him of his past actions, Jellal tries to atone by sacrificing himself with a self-destruction spell to destroy Nirvana. However, Brain appears and deactivates Jellal's spell, activating Nirvana's true form as a giant walking city, which he steers towards the Cait Shelter guildhall. Natsu and Lucy are attacked by Sherry, but she returns to her senses after Lyon reappears alive. Natsu battles Oración Seis member Cobra, the Poison Dragon Slayer, and defeats him with a deafening roar that overwhelms his heightened sense of hearing. Hoteye assists Fairy Tail by battling his own guildmate Midnight, but is defeated. Jura defeats Brain, but it does nothing to stop Nirvana from moving towards his intended destination.
19	January 15, 2010	978-4-06-384233-3	May 29, 2012	978-1-61262-056-5
153. "Counter Attack in the Middle of the Night" (僕の夜空に輝く星は, Boku no Yozora ni Kagayaku Hoshi wa); 154. "Your Words Especially" (君の言葉こそ・・・・, Kimi no Kotoba koso....); 155. "Last Man"; 156. "Zero" (ゼロ); 157. "From Heaven's Steed to the Fairies" (天馬から妖精たちへ, Tenma kara Yōsei-tachi e); 158. "The Door to Memory" (記憶の扉, Kioku no Tobira); 159. "The Flame of Guilt" (咎の炎, Toga no Honō); 160. "The Power of Emotion" (想いの力, Omoi no Chikara); Omake. "Side Story: The Day of the Fateful Encounter" (運命の出会いの日, Unmei no Deai no Hi)
With the last of his strength, Brain leads the heroes into a trap that gravely injures Jura. Meanwhile, Erza defeats Midnight, the last remaining member of the Oración Seis. This, however, awakens Brain's destructive alternate personality, Zero, whom Brain had sealed away with a spell that could only be lifted with the six's defeat. Zero pilots Nirvana to destroy Cait Shelter. The members of Blue Pegasus and Lamia Scale attack Nirvana on board Blue Pegasus's damaged airship, the Christina, saving the guildhall. Hibiki relays the information to stop Nirvana by simultaneously destroying the lacrima crystals powering its legs. Natsu chooses to destroy the crystal guarded by Zero, but is too injured to fight properly. Jellal regains his memories of Natsu and decides to help him while sending Wendy to destroy one of the crystals in his place. Natsu is initially hostile towards him, but Jellal gains his trust by defending him from one of Zero's attacks. He then gives Natsu a golden flame, the Flame of Guilt, which gives Natsu the ability to use Dragon Force and fight Zero.
20	March 17, 2010	978-4-06-384266-1	July 10, 2012	978-1-61262-057-2
161. "Fight for Right" (破邪顕正, Haja Kensei); 162. "I'm by Your Side" (私がついてる, Watashi ga Tsuiteru); 163. "The Scarlet Sky" (緋色の空, Hiiro no Sora); 164. "A Guild of One" (たった一人の為のギルド, Tatta Hitori no Tame no Girudo); 165. "Wendy the Fairy Girl" (妖精少女のウェンディ, Yōsei Shōjo no Wendi); 166. "Black Dragon" (黒竜, Kokuryū); 167. "The Vanishing Town" (消えゆく街, Kieyuku Machi); 168. "Earth-land" (アースランド, Āsu Rando); 169. "Edolas" (エドラス, Edorasu)
Natsu defeats Zero and destroys one of the lacrima crystals powering Nirvana at the same time as his friends do, destroying Nirvana. Jura and Hoteye help Natsu, Wendy, and Jellal escape the collapsing Nirvana with their friends. Shortly after, the Rune Knights arrest the members of the Oración Seis and Jellal. Natsu and his friends protest Jellal's arrest, but Erza respects Jellal's decision to turn himself in. The next day, the grateful members of Cait Shelter reveal themselves to be an illusion created by the guild's master, Robaul, to care for Wendy. Robaul explains he is a spirit from the ancient tribe that created Nirvana, which he wished to destroy to atone for creating it. With the alliance's mission complete, the Cait Shelter guild fades away, leaving Wendy to join Fairy Tail. While adjusting to life at her new guild, Wendy meets Mystogan, whom she realizes is the Jellal from her childhood. Mystogan warns Wendy of Magnolia's imminent destruction by a portal in the sky called anima, which later causes the city and most its inhabitants except Natsu, Wendy, Happy, and Carla to disappear. Carla explains that the portal leads to Edolas, where she and Happy were sent from as eggs for a mission only she knows. Determined to restore the city, the four enter Edolas through the portal and encounter doppelgangers of their guildmates who behave in opposite manners from their missing friends.
21	May 17, 2010	978-4-06-384296-8	September 25, 2012	978-1-61262-058-9
170. "Fairy Hunting" (妖精狩り, Yōsei Gari); 171. "Faust" (ファウスト, Fausuto); 172. "The Key to Hope" (希望の鍵, Kibō no Kagi); 173. "Fireball" (ファイアボール, Faiabōru); 174. "Revelation" (啓示, Keiji); 175. "Welcome Home" (おかえりなさいませ, Okaerinasaimase); 176. "Extalia" (エクスタリア, Ekusutaria); 177. "Fly to Your Friends!" (飛べ！友のもとに！, Tobe! Tomo no Moto ni!); 178. "Because I'm By Your Side" (となりにいるから, Tonari ni Iru kara)
Natsu, Wendy, Happy, and Carla learn that the Fairy Tail guild in Edolas is being hunted by the Edolas Kingdom's Royal Military; one of the military's commanders is a counterpart of Erza named Erza Nightwalker. They also hear that the king of Edolas, Faust, is using the anima portals to absorb magic and wizards from Earth-land and transform it into lacrima with which to replenish Edolas's dwindling magic resources. En route to the capital of Edolas, the four discover they cannot use their magic. The four gain the support of Lucy and Natsu's counterparts to reach the capital where they reunite with Earth-land's Lucy, who had avoided being absorbed through the anima thanks to her spirit Horologium, and is still able to use her magic. Carla guides her friends to the castle to interrogate Faust, but inadvertently leads them into a trap set by Nightwalker. Natsu, Lucy, and Wendy are detained while Happy and Carla are escorted to Extalia, a city on a floating island and the home of their race, the Exceed, who are revered in Edolas for their magical abilities, with their queen Chagot considered to be a god. Realizing that their mission to Earth-land entails hunting and killing dragon slayers, Happy flees the city with Carla. The two are sheltered by a kindly Exceed couple; Happy is unaware that they are his parents. With Lucy's death sentence imminent, Happy and Carla's resolve to save their friends causes them to regain their powers and save Lucy.
22	August 17, 2010	978-4-06-384346-0	November 27, 2012	978-1-61262-059-6
179. "Code ETD" (コードETD, Kōdo Ītīdī); 180. "Erza vs. Erza" (エルザ vs. エルザ, Eruza vs. Eruza); 181. "Full Out Attack of the Edolas Royal Forces" (エドラス王都総力戦!!, Edorasu Ōto Sōryokusen!!); 182. "It's People's Lives, Right?!!!" (命だろーか!!!!, Inochi Darō ka!!!!); 183. "Monster Academy" (モンスターアカデミー, Monsutā Akademī); 184. "For the Pride of the Great Celestial River" (星の大河は誇りの為に, Hoshi no Taiga wa Hokori no Tame ni); 185. "Ice Boy" (アイスボーイ, Aisu Bōi); 186. "My Cat" (オレのネコ, Ore no Neko); 187. "Chain Cannon of the Doomsday Dragon" (終焉の竜鎖砲, Shūen no Ryūsahō)
Aiming to bestow eternal magic to Edolas by colliding Extalia with the giant lacrima containing the residents of Earth-land, Faust transforms the Exceed army chasing Happy and Carla into a giant lacrima crystal. Before Nightwalker can capture Lucy, Happy, and Carla, the three are rescued by Earth-land's Gray and Erza Scarlet, who have been restored by Gajeel through the use of his dragon slayer magic. Scarlet and Nightwalker engage in a duel while Gray rescues Natsu and Wendy, who have been drained of their magic by Faust to power a magic cannon with which to carry out his plan. Gray gives them medicine that allows them to use their magic again. Wendy and Carla arrive in Extalia and fail to convince the Exceed of Faust's plan. Meanwhile, Gajeel goes to the giant lacrima crystal and is confronted by Panther Lily, an Exceed and a captain of the Edolas army, whom Gajeel decides to make his partner. After defeating Faust's minions, Natsu, Gray, and Scarlet attempt to use the cannon's ability to fire concentrated dragon slayer magic to return their friends to normal, but are distracted by Nightwalker and watch as the weapon fires a chain latching onto the floating island the giant lacrima is on.
23	October 15, 2010	978-4-06-384379-8	January 29, 2013	978-1-61262-060-2
188. "One Wing" (方翼, Katayoku); 189. "The Boy from Back Then" (あの時の少年, Ano Toki no Shōnen); 190. "Dragon Sense"; 191. "Three-Man Cell" (スリーマンセル, Surī Man Seru); 192. "Won't Run Anymore" (もう逃げない!, Mō Nigenai!); 193. "To Be Alive" (生きる者たちよ, Ikirumono-tachi yo); 194. "I'm Standing Right Here" (オレはここに立っている, Ore wa Koko ni Tatte Iru); 195. "King of a New World" (新しい世界の王, Atarashii Sekai no Ō); 196. "Demon God Dragneel" (大魔王ドラグニル, Daimaō Doraguniru)
Chagot appears before Wendy, Carla, and her people, and confesses that the Exceed's assumed divinity is a ruse to hide their true, weak nature. Carla's resolve to save Extalia inspires the Exceed to rally around her. The Exceed push the giant lacrima away from Extalia when Mystogan—revealed to be Edolas's prince and Faust's son—sends the lacrima through an anima portal, returning everyone trapped in it to Earth-land. The military arrives and boxes the Exceed in, transforming them into lacrima. Natsu, Gajeel, and Wendy defeat Faust in his mechanical, dragon-shaped robot, Droma Anim; Scarlet defeats Nightwalker; and Lucy and Gray defend the Exceed, with the Fairy Tail guild from Edolas rallying their support. To prevent another conflict over Edolas's dwindling magic power, Mystogan reverses the anima portals to return all of their world's magic taken from Earth-land, planning to take responsibility for the ensuing panic in the capital. However, Natsu poses as a villainous demon king so Mystogan can "defeat" him and take his rightful place as the ruler of Edolas.
24	December 17, 2010	978-4-06-384416-0	March 26, 2013	978-1-61262-266-8
197. "Bye-Bye Fairy Tail" (バイバイ 妖精の尻尾(フェアリーテイル), Baibai, Fearī Teiru); 198. "The Wings to Tomorrow" (明日への翼, Asu e no Tsubasa); 199. "Lisanna" (リサーナ, Risāna); 200. "He Who Snuffs Out Life" (生命を消す者, Inochi o Kesumono); 201. "Trial" (トライアル, Toraiaru); 202. "Best Partner" (ベストパートナー, Besuto Pātonā); 203. "Eight Paths" (8つの道, Yatsu no Michi); 204. "Who Is the Lucky One" (誰がラッキーですか?, Dare ga Rakkī desu ka?)
With Edolas saved, the Earth-land wizards and the Exceed return to Earth-land, where they find that Magnolia has been restored. Chagot explains that the Exceed's "mission" to kill dragon slayers is actually a cover story for the evacuation of 100 Exceed eggs, including Happy and Carla's, witnessed by Carla through her precognitive powers. Chagot and the other Exceed go their separate ways to search for their missing children and decides not to tell her daughter about her family ties. Panther Lily is accepted into Fairy Tail; the members also discover that Mirajane and Elfman's younger sister, Lisanna Strauss, has followed them back from Edolas after having been trapped in the parallel world and believed dead. After Lisanna rejoins Fairy Tail, the guild prepares for an examination held on Sirius Island, the guild's sacred ground, that will allow the one who passes to become an S-Class wizard. Cana Alberona is chosen as one of the exam's eight participants, and contemplates leaving the guild if she fails. Lucy decides to act as Cana's partner in the exam after hearing her reasons. With Lucy's help, Cana beats fellow examinee Fried Justine and his partner Bickslow in the exam's preliminary trial.
25	February 17, 2011	978-4-06-384442-9	April 23, 2013	978-1-61262-267-5
205. "Natsu vs. Gildarts" (ナツ vs. ギルダーツ, Natsu vs. Girudātsu); 206. "To Continue Down This Path" (この道を進む為に, Kono Michi o Susumu Tame ni); 207. "Mest" (メスト, Mesuto); 208. "Predator of Death" (死の捕食, Shi no Hoshoku); 209. "The Black Wizard" (黒魔導士, Kuro Madōshi); 210. "Stupid Gajeel" (ガジルのバカ, Gajiru no Baka); 211. "Kawazu and Yomazu" (カワズとヨマズ, Kawazu to Yomazu); 212. "Soul of Iron" (鉄の魂, Tetsu no Tamashii); 213. "One of the Seven Kin" (七眷属の一人, Nana Kenzoku no Hitori)
Natsu battles Gildarts Clive, Fairy Tail's strongest S-Class wizard, for his preliminary trial, which he passes after Gildarts causes him to surrender the match to teach him the benefits that fear has in helping him grow stronger. Natsu, Cana, and the other examinees who passed the preliminary trial are then instructed to search for the grave of Mavis Vermillion, the founder of Fairy Tail. However, Grimoire Heart, the strongest dark guild in Fiore, arrives at Sirius Island in search of the still-living dark wizard Zeref, whom Natsu briefly encounters. Gajeel is injured after fighting two of Grimoire Heart's forces, while Wendy and Doranbalt, an agent of the Magic Council posing as an exam participant named Mest Gryder, are attacked by Azuma, one of the dark guild's strongest group of wizards called the Seven Kin of Purgatory.
26	April 15, 2011	978-4-06-384473-3	May 28, 2013	978-1-61262-268-2
214. "Makarov on the Attack" (進撃のマカロフ, Shingeki no Makarofu); 215. "Makarov vs. Hades" (マカロフ vs. ハデス, Makarofu vs. Hadesu); 216. "The Essence of Magic" (魔道の真髄, Madō no Shinzui); 217. "Lost Magic" (失われた魔法(ロストマジック), Rosuto Majikku); 218. "Fire Dragon vs. Flame God" (火竜 vs. 炎神, Karyū vs. Enjin); 219. "The Dragon God's Gleaming Flame" (竜神の煌炎, Ryūjin no Kōen); 220. "Fairy Sisters" (妖精姉妹, Yōsei Shimai); 221. "The Great Magic World" (大魔法世界, Dai Mahō Sekai); 222. "Arc of Incarnation" (具現のアーク, Gugen no Āku)
Makarov tries to fend off Grimoire Heart by fighting against the dark guild's master Hades, whom he recognizes as Precht Gaebolg, his predecessor as Fairy Tail's master. However, Makarov is utterly defeated, leaving the rest of Fairy Tail to deal with Grimoire Heart's forces, including the Seven Kin, who reveal their guild's plan to awaken Zeref's power to create a new world where only wizards can survive while the rest of the human population would be annihilated. Natsu defeats Zancrow of the Seven Kin, but Mirajane and Lisanna are defeated by Azuma, and Elfman and Evergreen by Rustyrose. Meanwhile, Ultear Milkovich, the Seven Kin's leader, discovers and captures the weakened Zeref.
27	June 17, 2011	978-4-06-384502-0	June 25, 2013	978-1-61262-269-9
223. "The Human Gate" (人間の扉, Ningen no Tobira); 224. "The Ambition of Zoldio" (ゾルディオの野望, Zorudio no Yabō); 225. "The Open Seam" (綻び, Hokorobi); 226. "A Curse of Vengeance" (丑の刻参り, Ushi no Koku Mairi); 227. "Lucy Fire" (ルーシィファイア, Rūshī Faia); 228. "Rain Soaked the 13th Woman" (13の女は雨に濡れて, Jū-san no Onna wa Ame ni Nurete); 229. "Dead End of Despair" (絶望の袋小路, Zetsubō no Fukurokōji); 230. "Tears of Love and Vitality" (愛と活力の涙, Ai to Katsuryoku no Namida)
Loke defeats Capricorn, a celestial spirit possessed by Zoldio of the Seven Kin, releasing the spirit and allowing him to join Lucy. Still determined to find Mavis' grave and pass the exam, Cana puts Lucy to sleep and abandons her, leaving her to be attacked by Kain Hikaru. Natsu rescues Lucy and the two defeat Hikaru, after which they regroup with Wendy. Erza and Juvia Lockser confront Merudy, who holds Gray responsible for the death of Ultear's mother, Ur, and wishes to kill him. Juvia sends Erza to regroup with their friends while she faces Merudy alone. Merudy uses her magic to synchronize her own physical senses with Juvia and Gray to ensure Gray's death regardless of the fight's outcome. However, Juvia talks Merudy out of committing suicide, causing her to surrender.
28	August 17, 2011	978-4-06-384533-4	July 30, 2013	978-1-61262-270-5
231. "The One Who Ends It" (終わらせる者, Owaraserumono); 232. "The Word I Couldn't Say" (言えなかった一言, Ienakatta Hitokoto); 233. "Fairy Glitter" (妖精の輝き(フェアリーグリッター), Fearī Gurittā); 234. "The Boy Who Watches the Sea" (海を見つめる少年, Umi o Mitsumeru Shōnen); 235. "Sirius Tree" (天狼樹, Tenrō-ju); 236. "Erza vs. Azuma" (エルザ vs. アズマ, Eruza vs. Azuma); 237. "What Kind of Guild Is This" (なんてギルドだ, Nante Girudo da); 238. "At One Time"; 239. "The Freezing Warrior" (凍える闘志, Kogoeru Tōshi)
Cana finds Mavis' grave and contemplates her decision to become an S-Class wizard to reveal to Gildarts that she is his daughter. She is devastated when she realizes she has betrayed Lucy and, taking the powerful Fairy Glitter spell from the grave, returns to save her, Natsu, and Wendy from Hades' subordinate, Blue Note Stinger. Cana is unable to defeat Blue Note, but Gildarts arrives to battle him, as do Fried and Bickslow to help Levy and Lisanna fight Rustyrose. Azuma destroys the massive tree on Sirius Island that increases the strength of all the Fairy Tail wizards on the island, weakening them. When Erza defeats Azuma and restores some of the tree's magic, the others defeat their respective opponents. Meanwhile, Gray meets Ultear, who tries tricking him into defeating Hades using the self-sacrificing spell Iced Shell so she can keep Zeref for herself. Unfooled by Ultear's deception, Gray fights her.
29	October 17, 2011	978-4-06-384563-1	August 27, 2013	978-1-61262-406-8
240. "Gray vs. Ultear" (グレイ vs. ウルティア, Gurei vs. Urutia); 241. "The Power of 'Life'" ("生"なる力, "Sei" Naru Chikara); 242. "Acnologia" (アクノロギア, Akunorogia); 243. "Errors and Experience" (過ちと経験, Ayamachi to Keiken); 244. "The Peal of Thunder" (雷鳴響く, Raimei Hibiku); 245. "The Man Without the Mark" (紋章を刻まぬ男, Monshō o Kizamanu Otoko); 246. "The Region of the Depths" (深淵の領域, Shin'en no Ryōiki); 247. "Just Look How Close" (こんなに近くにいる, Konna ni Chikaku ni Iru); 248. "Dawn on Sirius Island" (暁の天狼島, Akatsuki no Tenrō-jima)
Ultear plans to use Zeref's power to exact revenge on her mother for apparently abandoning her to be experimented on by unethical physicians as a child. During her battle with Gray, Ultear experiences flashbacks of Ur's memories in the ocean; witnessing the doctors deceiving Ur with false news of her daughter's death, Ultear understands and accepts her mother's love. Gray defeats Ultear and regroups with Erza, Natsu, Lucy, and Wendy to confront Hades. Despite battling at full strength and being assisted by the return of Laxus, Hades's power continues to increase to the point where he becomes invincible. During their search for the power source of Hades's airship, however, Happy, Carla, and Panther Lily instead find and destroy the machine that gives Hades his magic power. With Hades weakened and the destroyed Sirius Tree restored by Ultear, the Fairy Tail wizards defeat Hades.
30	December 16, 2011	978-4-06-384597-6	September 24, 2013	978-1-61262-407-5
249. "Magic Is Alive" (魔法は生きている, Mahō wa Ikiteiru); 250. "Zeref Awakened" (ゼレフ覚醒, Zerefu Kakusei); 251. "The Right to Love" (愛する資格, Ai Suru Shikaku); 252. "To You Prideful Brats" (誇り高きクソガキどもへ, Hokori Takaki Kusogaki-domo e); 253. "Let's Join Hands" (手をつなごう, Te o Tsunagō); 254. "Fairy Tail, X791" (X791年・妖精の尻尾(フェアリーテイル), Nana-hyaku Kyūjū-ichi-nen Fearī Teiru); 255. "Fairy Sphere" (妖精の球(フェアリースフィア), Fearī Sufia); 256. "Seven Empty Years" (空白の7年, Kūhaku no Nana-nen); 257. "Father's Seven Years" (父親の7年, Chichioya no Nana-nen)
Makarov allows Hades to flee the island alive, but Hades is killed inside his airship by Zeref, who reveals Grimoire Heart's efforts at reviving him to have been for naught. Elsewhere, Ultear attempts suicide out of guilt for her past actions, but Merudy rescues her, and they decide to live together. On the island, Makarov suspends the S-Class trial, and Cana reveals to Gildarts their relationship. As a result of Grimoire Heart's attempts to capture Zeref, the dragon Acnologia appears and seemingly destroys Sirius Island, causing the Fairy Tail members to disappear. Seven years later, the rest of the Fairy Tail guild has fallen into disrepair, becoming the weakest guild in Fiore. However, the missing members return, having been protected by the Fairy Sphere spell cast by Mavis' spirit. The guild celebrates their return while Lucy discovers that Jude has died, but finds herself fully at peace with him upon finding seven years worth of gifts from him, proving that he truly loved her.
