= List of Jack Frost chapters =

This is a list of chapters of the Jack Frost manhwa. When naming the individual chapters, instead of the word chapter, this manhwa consistently uses the word violence.

== List of chapters ==
=== Volumes 1-5 ===
No.	Title	Original release date	English release date
1	Jack frost (잭 프로스트)	—	May 12, 2009; 978-0-7595-2954-0
Violence 1 - "Amityville"; Violence 2 - "Scissors"; Violence 3 - "Arvid"; Violence 4 - "Night of Crescent"; Violence 5 - "Genie and Hansen"; Violence 6 - "Declaration of War"; Violence 7 - "Jack's Death"
"Any high schooler on a nerve-wracking first day at a new school is apt to lose his or her head a little, but in Noh-A’s case, she literally does! When she wakes up in one piece with a little help from a mysterious doctor, Noh-A quickly realizes that nothing is as it seems at Amityville High, where paranormal creatures battle for supremacy. Caught in the crossfire, Noh-A may have to rely on the unlikely (and possibly unreliable) aid of the most sinister student at Amityville…the deadly Jack Frost!"
2	Jack frost (잭 프로스트)	—	November 17, 2009; 978-0-7595-2953-3
Violence 8 - "14th Requiem"; Violence 9 - "Lost Lake"; Violence 10 - "Immortalizer"; Violence 11 - "Forest of Unicorn"; Violence 12 - "Kite Clan"; Violence 13 - "Loyalty"; Violence 14 - "Repeat"; Violence 15 - "Devil Thread"
"All hell breaks loose when gangs from schools all over Amityville erupt into an all-out war for supremacy. But even as they battle one another, these powerful warriors from the South, East, and West Districts all have the same goal — to be the brave soul who defeats Jack Frost and claims to the title of greatest fighter Amityville has ever seen. Jack has a mission of his own: escorting Noh-A, the much sought-after Mirror Image, to a place where a great evil was sealed many years ago."
3	Jack frost (잭 프로스트)	—	July 13, 2010; 978-0-316-07786-6
Violence 16 - "The Antler of The Unicorn"; Violence 17 - "Coexistence With The Other Side"; Violence 18 - "Awakening"; Violence 19 - "Flashback"; Violence 20 - "Pause"; Violence 21 - "The Second Mission"; Violence 22 - "Flashback I"; Violence 23 - "Flashback II"
"Noh-A watches in fear as Omu strikes down Maru, the last offspring of the Unicorn. With the last obstacle removed and Jack fighting elsewhere in the forest, Omu seizes the Antler of the Unicorn. In an effort to snatch Noh-A’s immortality for himself, Omu plunges the Antler deep into her chest. But as the sharp horn pierces her heart, Noh-A is greeted not by death, but by life. Her real life — the life she had before she found herself in Amityville. Though she has longed to uncover the mystery of her forgotten past, nothing could have prepared Noh-A for what she sees…"
4	Jack frost (잭 프로스트)	—	December 21, 2010; 978-0-316-12674-8
Violence 24 - "Provoction"; Violence 25 - "Non Dream"; Violence 26 - "Der Freischütz - Part I"; Violence 27 - "Der Freischütz - Part II"; Violence 28 - "Der Freischütz - Part III"; Violence 29 - "Der Freischütz - Part IV"
"Siegfried of the South District makes his move against the North, and his weapon of choice is…Jin? But despite the fact that this latest threat to her power bears the countenance of her associate, Helmina does not hesitate to unleash her terrible strength against Jin. With Siegfried successfully removed from the good doctor’s mind, Helmina plots her next strategy…Will even Jack Frost be able to counter the devils she is prepared to release?"
