= Booking (manhwa) =

South Korean manhwa magazine

- Categories: Manhwa
- Frequency: Monthly
- Publisher: Haksan Publishing
- First issue: December 1998
- Country: South Korea
- Language: Korean
- Website: Booking

Booking (Korean: 부킹) is a monthly manhwa anthology published by the South Korean Haksanpub. The magazine was created by editor-in-chief Park Seong-sik.

== Currently running manhwa titles ==
- Aflame Inferno
- Witchcraft Troops
- Street Jam
- Yongbi Bulpae Oejeon
- The Phantom King
- Beast 9

== Currently running manga titles ==
- Fullmetal Alchemist
- Inuyasha
- Vagabond
- Hatsukoi Limited

== Published manhwa ==
- Aflame Inferno
- ChunChu (on hiatus)
- Banya: The Explosive Delivery Man
- Shaman Warrior
- Ghost
- Aspirin
- Smacker
- XS
- High School
- Veritas
- Jack Frost

== Published manga ==
- Hunter × Hunter
- Kamen Teacher
