= List of The World God Only Knows episodes =

The World God Only Knows (神のみぞ知るセカイ; Kami nomi zo Shiru Sekai) is an anime series based on the manga series of the same name by Tamiki Wakaki serialized in Weekly Shōnen Sunday magazine. The anime is produced by Manglobe, directed by Masato Takayanagi, series composition by Hideyuki Kurata, character design by Akio Watanabe, art direction by Ayumi Satō and Kayoko Tokō and sound directed by Yoshikazu Iwanami. The first season aired from October 6, 2010, to December 22, 2010, on TV Tokyo, TV Hokkaido and TV Setouchi and on later dates on TV Aichi, TV Osaka and TVQ Kyushu. A second season titled The World God Only Knows II aired from April 11, 2011, to June 28, 2011. A third season, titled The World God Only Knows: Goddesses (神のみぞ知るセカイ 女神篇), aired from July 8, 2013, to September 23, 2013.

The series follows the exploits of Keima Katsuragi, an intelligent, gloomy teenager who is known on the Internet as "The God of Conquest" for his legendary skills to "conquer" any girl in Bishōjo games, yet does not like girls in real life, where he is known as the Otamegane (オタメガネ), a derogatory portmanteau of the two words otaku (オタク) and Megane (メガネ, lit. glasses). One day, out of pride, he accidentally accepts what he assumes to be a challenge for a Bishōjo game when in reality he has accepted a contract from a bumbling demoness named Elsie who asks for his help in capturing runaway spirits from Hell who are hiding in the hearts of girls. The only way to force the spirits out of the girls hearts is by replacing the spirits in the girls' hearts with himself (metaphorically speaking) by making the girls fall in love with him, much to Keima's horror. With the threat of death for both of them should he refuse, Keima has no choice but to help Elsie. Together with his intelligence and knowledge of the dating sim genre and Elsie's magical powers, Keima is about to embark on his greatest challenge.

An OVA episode, titled 4 girls and an Idol (4人とアイドル, Yonin to Aidoru), was released with the limited edition of the 14th manga volume on September 16, 2011. The episode's opening theme song is "Natsu Iro Surprise" (夏色サプライズ, lit. "Surprise Summer Colors") which is once again performed by Tōyama and the ending theme song, "Hajimete Koi o Shita Kioku" (始めて恋をした記憶, lit. "Memories of First Love") is performed by Kana Asumi. It is based on chapters 54–55 of the manga, in which Chihiro Kosaka forms a band called the "2B Pencils".

A two-episode OVA, based on the character Tenri Ayukawa and titled Tenri Arc (天理篇, Tenri-Hen), was released together with the limited editions of the 19th and 20th manga volumes on October 16, 2012, and December 18, 2012, respectively. The ending theme songs, "Hikari no Kiseki" (ヒカリノキセキ, lit. "Miracle of Light") and "Mirai e no Tobira" (未来への扉, lit. "Door to the Future"), are both performed by Eyelis.

A fourth OVA episode, featuring the character Kanon Nagakawa becoming a magical girl and titled Magical Star Kanon 100% (マジカル☆スターかのん100%) was released together with the limited edition of the 22nd manga volume on June 18, 2013. The episode's opening theme song is "Kanon 100%" (かのん100%) and the ending theme "Kimi-iro Love Song" (君色ラブソング, lit. "Your Multicolor Love Song") are again performed by Tōyama.

== Series overview ==
Season	Episodes	Japanese airdates	
Season	Episodes	First aired	Last aired
1	12	October 6, 2010	December 22, 2010
2	12	April 11, 2011	June 28, 2011
3	12	July 8, 2013	September 23, 2013

== Episodes ==
=== The World God Only Knows (2010) ===
No.	Title (Note: Title of the episode: literally translated, romanized using Hepburn romanization, and in kanji form)	Original release date (Note: Date the episode originally aired on TV Tokyo)
1	"Flag.1.0 Love Makes the World Go 'Round"; Transliteration: "Sekai wa ai de Ugoite Iru" (Japanese: Flag.1.0 世界はアイで動いている)	October 6, 2010
2	"Flag.2.0 Demon of a Sister"; Transliteration: "Akumademo Imouto desu" (Japanese: Flag.2.0 あくまでも妹です)	October 13, 2010
3	"Flag.3.0 Drive My Car"; Transliteration: "Doraivu Mai Kā" (Japanese: Flag.3.0 ドライヴ・マイ・カー)	October 20, 2010
4	"Flag.4.0 On a Crusade"; Transliteration: "Ima Soko ni Aru Seisen" (Japanese: Flag.4.0 今そこにある聖戦)	October 27, 2010
5	"Flag.5.0 IDOL BOMB!!"	November 3, 2010
6	"Flag.6.0 I’m Ordinary?"; Transliteration: "Watashi Heibon?" (Japanese: Flag.6.0 ワタシ平凡?)	November 10, 2010
7	"Flag.7.0 Shining Star"	November 17, 2010
8	"Flag.8.0 Coupling With, With, With..."	November 24, 2010
9	"Flag.9.0 Inside & Outside the Big Wall"; Transliteration: "Ōki na Kabe no Naka to Soto" (Japanese: Flag.9.0 大きな壁の中と外)	December 1, 2010
10	"Flag.10.0 Inside of Me..."; Transliteration: "Atashi no Naka no ......" (Japanese: Flag.10.0 あたしの中の……)	December 8, 2010
11	"Flag.11.0 The Last Day"; Transliteration: "Oshimai no Hi" (Japanese: Flag.11.0 おしまいの日)	December 15, 2010
12	"Flag.12.0 More Than a God, Less Than a Human"; Transliteration: "Kami Ijou, Ningen Miman" (Japanese: Flag.12.0 神以上、人間未満)	December 22, 2010

=== The World God Only Knows II (2011) ===
No. overall	No. in season	Title	Original release date
13	1	"Flag.1.0 Flower in Bloom"; Transliteration: "Ikka Ryōran" (Japanese: Flag.1.0 一花繚乱)	April 12, 2011
14	2	"Flag.2.0 Problem Solved by the Fist"; Transliteration: "Ikken Rakuchaku" (Japanese: Flag.2.0 一挙落着)	April 19, 2011
15	3	"Flag.3.0 The Section Chief Cometh"; Transliteration: "Chikuchō, Kitaru." (Japanese: Flag.3.0 地区長、来たる。)	April 26, 2011
16	4	"Flag.4.0 The Section Chief Regains Her Pride"; Transliteration: "Chikuchō, Hokori o Torimodosu." (Japanese: Flag.4.0 地区長、誇りを取り戻す。)	May 3, 2011
17	5	"Flag.5.0 It Always Raining When We Get There"; Transliteration: "Tadoritsuitara Itsumo Ame Furi" (Japanese: Flag.5.0 たどりついたらいつも雨ふり)	May 10, 2011
18	6	"Flag.6.0 10% Chance of Rain"; Transliteration: "10% no Ameyohou" (Japanese: Flag.6.0 10%の雨予報)	May 17, 2011
19	7	"Flag.7.0 Singing in the Rain"	May 24, 2011
20	8	"Flag.8.0 Her First Errand"; Transliteration: "Hajimete no☆Otsukai" (Japanese: Flag.8.0 はじめての☆おつかい)	May 31, 2011
21	9	"Flag.9.0 Class 2-B Miss Nagase"; Transliteration: "2-Nen B-gumi Nagase-sensei" (Japanese: Flag.9.0 2年B組長瀬先生)	June 7, 2011
22	10	"Flag.10.0 School☆Wars"; Transliteration: "Sukūru☆Uōzu" (Japanese: スクール☆ウォーズ)	June 14, 2011
23	11	"Flag.11.0 There's Always a Sun in Your Heart"; Transliteration: "Itsumo Kokoro ni Taiyō o" (Japanese: いつも心に太陽を)	June 21, 2011
24	12	"Flag.12.0 Summer Wars"; Transliteration: "Samā Uōzu" (Japanese: サマーウォーズ)	June 28, 2011

=== The World God Only Knows: Goddesses (2013) ===
No. overall	No. in season	Title	Original release date
25	1	"Flag. 1.0 When the Sun Goes Down"	July 8, 2013
26	2	"Flag. 2.0 Scrambled Formation"; Transliteration: "Sukuranburu Fōmēshon" (Japanese: スクランブルフォーメーション)	July 15, 2013
27	3	"Flag. 3.0 5 Home"	July 22, 2013
28	4	"Flag. 4.0 Doll Roll Hall"	July 29, 2013
29	5	"Flag. 5.0 Punch and Date"; Transliteration: "Panchi de Dēto" (Japanese: ぱんちDEでーと)	August 5, 2013
30	6	"Flag. 6.0 About me" Transliteration: "Watashi ni Tsuite." (Japanese: 私について。)	August 12, 2013
31	7	"Flag. 7.0 Bad Medicine"	August 19, 2013
32	8	"Flag. 8.0 Goddess Mix"; Transliteration: "Megami Mikkusu" (Japanese: めがみみっくす)	August 26, 2013
33	9	"Flag. 9.0 Absent Lovers"	September 2, 2013
34	10	"Flag. 10.0 Labyrinth"; Transliteration: "Rabirinsu" (Japanese: ラビリンス)	September 9, 2013
35	11	"Flag. 11.0 SHOW ME"	September 16, 2013
36	12	"Flag. 12.0 The Memory of My First Love"; Transliteration: "Hajimete Koi o Shita Kioku" (Japanese: 初めて恋をした記憶)	September 23, 2013

=== OVAs ===
No.	Title	Original release date
0	"Flag.0"	September 17, 2010
A preview OVA that was released together with Volume 10 of the manga. Hosted by Hiro Shimono and Kanae Itō who voice Keima and Elsie respectively, the hosts introduce and talk about the series, the anime and their characters. Included in the end is a short animated prologue which introduces Elsie and her induction as a spirit hunter.
1	"4 Girls and an Idol"; Transliteration: "Yonin to Aidoru" (Japanese: 4人とアイドル)	September 16, 2011
Chihiro forms a rock band with her friends Elsie, Ayumi and Miyako. But their music is horrible and needs more practice; Elsie suggests forming a light music club after viewing an anime about it. They seek a club room, however, Mr. Kodama, the head of the arts clubs, gives them a challenge: If they can get 100% on their next English tests, they will get a club room, otherwise they will have extra class work. Chihiro at first wants to give up on the club idea but when Kanon comes back to school to take her tests and tells the band that she will be performing for the school fall dance festival, she changes her mind and wants the band to be on stage together with Kanon. In order to help them, Elsie drags Keima to help teach her, Chihiro, Ayumi and later Kanon for their English test. Keima refuses since most of the girls were his past conquest but reluctantly agrees after Elsie assures him that they don't remember that. However, Chihiro, Ayumi and Kanon acts awkward and embarrass every time he teaches them but he manages to give them helpful tips for their tests. By the time their results are out, Miyako, Chihiro and Ayumi manage to get 100% except Elsie but a joyful Kodama allows the club to be formed because Keima got 99% as the latter was bothered by the girls behavior. Kanon also got 100% as well but was more happy to have made new friends. Now with their own club room, Chihiro's band, The 2-B Pencils starts practicing.
2	"Reunion"; Transliteration: "Saikai" (Japanese: 再会)	October 16, 2012
Part 1 of the Tenri Arc. Summer Vacation begins, but Keima's plan of nonstop gaming is interrupted by his mother to meet her friend Mrs Ayukawa and her shy daughter Tenri, his childhood friend from ten years who Keima doesn't remember. Elsie's detects a spirit inside Tenri, but Keima isn't interested and just wants to play games. But both of them see Tenri at the mall with a different, colder personality, which Keima reluctantly accepts to capture her heart. Meanwhile, Tenri is lectured by Diana, her other personality who, despite her dislike for him, Diana suggests Tenri should try to rekindle her relationship with Keima but the latter is too shy. Tenri is confronted by Nora, a Spirit hunter and her human partner Ryō Asama. Nora, who is known to force spirits out from humans by violent means, reads Tenri mind and thinks Keima is the cause of her possession and plans to kill him. But after Nora captures Keima and Elsie explains that he is her partner, Nora decides torture his mind instead. Keima has a dream of being with Yokkyun which Nora "kills" her which angers Keima that he breaks free from Nora's restrains and scares her away. As Nora plans to kill Keima despite knowing Elsie will die as well, Keima, Elsie and Tenri hides at the school theater. Concluding Diana is not like other spirits, Keima tasks Elsie to find another spirit to fool Nora. Alone with Tenri, Diana corrects Keima that she is not a spirit. When Tenri shows Keima a secret tunnel under the theater, he starts to remember his past with Tenri.
3	"Chance Meeting"; Transliteration: "Kaikō" (Japanese: 邂逅)	December 18, 2012
Part 2 of the Tenri Arc. As they journey through the tunnel, Keima remembers an incident ten years ago during a field trip at the beach. While he and Tenri were on a sailing ship, an earthquake struck which stranded the ship off the coast. Hoping to find a way back to the mainland, they went into a tunnel under the ship where Tenri falls for Keima due to his bravery and giving her his lunch. However, another earthquake struck which knocked out Keima. Tenri and Diana reveal after that happened, creatures called Weiss (which Keima later realizes are the evil spirits) appeared surrounding him and Tenri until Diana helped them escape to the theater after the former agreed to let Diana take over her body. Realizing there's a connection between Diana and the spirits, she reveals she was the one who sealed the spirits in Hell. Unfortunately, Nora and Ryō find them. Knowing Nora will keep chasing them until she captures a spirit, Keima has a plan. They fool Nora into believing a weak spirit that Diana captured is Tenri's spirit by having Elsie release it after Tenri stands up to Nora's accusations that she hates Keima and confesses she loves him. Keima kisses her in front of Nora to make it look real. With Nora no longer after them, Keima wants to know more about the Weiss but Diana tells him she will give him the answers the next time they meet. The next day, Keima and Elsie are surprised to discover the Ayukawas are their new neighbors. As the credits roll with scenes of the current and new characters of the series, Elsie announces the third season of the anime and a new OVA.
4	"Magical Star Kanon 100%"; Transliteration: "Majikaru Sutā Kanon 100%" (Japanese: マジカル☆スターかのん100%)	June 18, 2013
Elsie heads for an audition where the winner gets to play as Kanon's little sister on her kid TV show Weather Girl Magical Girl Kanon. As she is refused entry for being too old, Elsie detects a spirit and heads into the TV Station to find Kanon, who has been turned into a child. As Elsie decides to capture the spirit herself, Kanon is mistaken by her manager Okada for one of the young girls here for the audition and is brought into the studio. Using the alias, Maron Nakagawa, she befriends a shy girl named Kozue, who's a fan of hers. When Kanon sees another person who looks like her coming to the studio, Elsie realizes it is the spirit in disguise who is using the audition to find a host. Kanon manages to prove she is the real one by singing one of her songs which the impostor reacts negatively and reveals its true form while knocking out the adults and kidnapping the girls. Realizing her songs, which are filled with positive energy affects the spirit, Kanon is determined to save her fans which turns her into a real Magical girl. As she flies to the roof and confronts the spirit, she sings her songs which turns her body back to normal and weakens the spirit which Elsie is able to capture it. Relieved, Kanon passes out and later wakes up to find herself back in the studio. Believing at first everything was just a dream, Kozue reveals she remembers everything which Kanon tells her to keep it a secret and selects her as her little sister. Elsie heads home with the spirit only to chase another one who has turned her into a child as well.
