= Omake =

Japanese meaning "extra", referring to additional anime, manga and DVD content

Omake (御負け, usually written おまけ) means extra in Japanese. Its primary meaning is general and widespread. It is used as an anime and manga term to mean "extra or bonus". In the United States and United Kingdom, anime fans generally use the term in a narrow sense to describe special features on DVD releases: deleted scenes, interviews with the actors, "the making of" documentary clips, outtakes, amusing bloopers, and so forth. However, this use of the term predates the DVD medium by several years. For at least the past fifty years in Japan, omake of small character figurines and toys have been giveaways that come with soft drinks and candy, and sometimes, the omake is more desired than the product being sold.

In English, the term is often used with this meaning, although it generally only applies to features included with anime, tokusatsu, and occasionally manga. Therefore, it is generally limited to use among fans of Japanese pop culture (sometimes called otaku), and like many loanwords from Japanese, omake is both the singular and plural form.

== Description ==
Omake often include comedy sketches where the characters behave out of character, break the fourth wall, or subtly address opinions of the fandom known to the writers. Sometimes scenes from the TV show or OVA are humorously re-dubbed. One example, included on the Video Girl Ai DVD, replays scenes from the OVA series with new voice-acting in a rural accent. Other times, the same actors voice a new script that is more sexually suggestive, often ludicrously so. Omake can also consist of non-canonical, and often comedic crossover clips that sometimes occur at the end of episodes of two shows airing concurrently from the same studio, such as recent Kamen Rider and Super Sentai programs.

A screenshot of an anime omake, taken from Gunbuster. Here, chibi versions of the main characters attempt to explain the concept of "Ice II".

For anime, these are often presented in super deformed style, in the same way manga omake often is. For example, the anime OVA Gunbuster features super deformed characters trying to explain what the writers know to be mostly pseudo-science, or talking about their relationships with each other in a way they do not in the series itself. In the anime series Reborn!, one of the characters named Haru Miura has an interview with each of the characters of the anime in chibi forms, and the characters' answers to the questions are often something they would never say in the anime or the manga. For live action programs, although not animated, the expressions and sound effects used for comedic purposes can often be inspired by the omake found in the animated mediums.

The term "omake" has use also in video games; the Sega game Shenmue II for the Dreamcast had a hidden folder on the game disc labelled "Omake", found by placing the disc into a computer, containing exclusive wallpapers and conception art.

Another example of an omake in popular culture is related to Square's Final Fantasy IX. The secret "Blackjack" minigame after completion of the game is accessed by means of a button combination. The Final Fantasy "Playonline" site has a secrets section for Final Fantasy IX, requiring passwords given in the official Piggyback guide to enter. The password needed to reveal the button combination for the Blackjack minigame is E-OMAKE. The minigame itself is an omake.

In some fiction writing communities based on forum sites, the term "omake" refer to derivative stories posted in a story thread, usually by users other than the author of the thread, and as a general rule are non-canonical by default. Members of these communities occasionally refer to having written or posted an omake with the term "omaked".

Omake occasionally appears in fanfiction about anime or manga, after the story itself, usually as a humorous "alternative ending". An example of this is that at the end of each episode of Dance in the Vampire Bund is a 20–30 second chibi skit called "Dance with the Vampire Maids".

== See also ==
- Easter egg (media)
- Lagniappe
