= Haksan Publishing =

South Korean publishing company

Haksan Publishing Co., Ltd.
- Type: Subsidiary
- Industry: Comics, Animation, Books
- Founded: 1995; 31 years ago
- Headquarters: Seoul, South Korea
- Parent: Daewon Media

Haksan Publishing Co., Ltd. (Korean: 학산문화사; RR: Haksan Munhwasa; lit. 'Haksan Culture (company)') is a South Korean publisher known for its large selections of domestic and imported comics (manga/manhwa) and light novels. It was established in Seoul in 1995 and is a subsidiary of Daewon Media. In 2018, Haksan Publishing, along with Seoul Media Comics and Daewon C.I., made up 49 percent of the print comic book market in South Korea.

In 2018, KakaoPage acquired 19.8 percent of the company.

== Publishing ==
=== Magazines ===
- Chance (찬스; Chanseu) – Monthly comics magazine for boys.
- Booking – Bi-weekly comics magazine for boys.
- Party (파티; Pa-ti) – Monthly comics magazine for girls.

=== Collected volumes imprints ===
- Chance Comics (찬스 코믹스; Chanseu Komikseu)

=== Light novels ===
- May Queen Novel (메이퀸 노벨; Meikwin Nobel) – Translated version of Kadokawa Beans Bunko and Cobalt Bunko.
- Extreme Novel (익스트림 노벨; Ikseuteurim Nobel) – Translated version of Kadokawa Sneaker Bunko, Dengeki Bunko, Fujimi Mystery Bunko, Famitsu Bunko, and EX Novels.
- Carnival Novel (카니발 노벨; Kanibal Novel) – Original South Korean light novels.

=== Manhwa ===
- Rure, a manhwa by Da-Mi Seomoon serialized in Party. It was licensed by Tokyopop in the United States and by Saphira in France.
