= List of Gangan Comics manga franchises =

Gangan Comics ガンガンンコミックス
- Parent company: Enix (1991–2003); Square Enix (present)
- Status: Active
- Founded: 1991
- Country of origin: Japan
- Headquarters location: Japan
- Distribution: Japan
- Publication types: Manga, Japanese Magazines, Japanese light novels, graphic novels
- Official website: gangan.square-enix.co.jp

Gangan (ガンガン, Gangan) is a manga imprint owned by Square Enix. It publishes manga in several magazines aimed at different reader demographic groups in the Japanese market. Its magazines are home to some popular Square Enix manga series which were adapted into anime series, like Fullmetal Alchemist, Moribito: Guardian of the Spirit, Nabari no Ou, Inu x Boku SS, and Soul Eater. The comics are later collected in paperback volumes under brand names such as Gangan Comics (ガンガンコミックス, Gangan Komikkusu), Gangan Comics Joker (ガンガンコミックスJOKER, Gangan Komikkusu Jōkā) and Young Gangan Comics (ヤングガンガンコミックス, Yangu Gangan Komikkusu), which identify the magazine of serialisation. This list contains notable manga franchises published by Gangan.

== Manga and anime franchises owned by Square Enix ==
Franchise	Date established and imprint	Total sales of franchise	Content	Author(s)	Total ep(s) and OVA (Note: Total number of episodes including OVAs)	Ongoing?
Fullmetal Alchemist	2001, Monthly Shōnen Gangan	70,300,000 (as of 2018)	1 manga series, 2 anime series, 2 movies, 5 games	Hiromu Arakawa	119	No
Black Butler	2006, Monthly GFantasy	28,000,000 (as of 2019)	1 manga series, 3 anime series, 2 movies, 1 game	Yana Toboso	55	Yes
Dragon Quest Retsuden: Roto no Monshō	2004, Monthly Shōnen Gangan	20,900,000 (as of 2018)	1 manga series, 1 movie	Chiaki Kawamata, Junji Koyanagi, Kamui Fujiwara	21	No
Soul Eater	2004, Monthly Shōnen Gangan	19,600,000 (as of 2019)	2 manga series (1 original, 1 spin off), 2 anime series, 3 games	Atsushi Ōkubo	51	No
A Certain Magical Index	2007, Monthly Shōnen Gangan	14,000,000 (light novel only, as of 2013)	6 manga series (3 canon, 3 spin off), 2 light novel series, 3 anime series, 4 spin off anime, 1 movie, 3 games	Various	74	No
Magical Circle Guru Guru	1992, Monthly Shōnen Gangan	13,100,000 (as of 2018)	1 manga series, 2 anime series, 1 anime film, 4 games	Hiroyuki Etō	83	No
The Irregular at Magic High School	2008, Monthly GFantasy	10,000,000 (light novel only, as of 2019)	7 manga series, 1 light novel, 1 anime series, 1 anime movie, 2 games	Tsutomu Satō	26	Yes
Violinist of Hameln	1991, Monthly Shōnen Gangan	6,800,000 (as of 2018) (Note: The Japanese title of this is Hamerun no Baiorin Hiki, the reference provided uses the Japanese name and provides sales data of 6.8 million.)	2 manga series, 1 anime series, 1 movie, 1 game	Michiaki Watanabe	25	No
Arakawa Under the Bridge	2004, Young Gangan	6,400,000 (as of 2018)	1 manga series, 2 anime series, 1 movie, 1 drama series	Hikaru Nakamura	26	No
Barakamon	2008, Gangan Online	6,200,000 (as of 2018)	1 manga series, 1 spin-off manga series, 2 anime series	Satsuki Yoshino	24	No
Papuwa	1991, Monthly Shōnen Gangan	6,000,000 (as of 2018)	1 manga series, 2 anime series, 2 games	Ami Shibata	68	No
Saki	2006, Young Gangan	5,700,000 (as of 2018)	5 manga series, 3 anime series, 2 games, 1 ova	Ritz Kobayashi	55	Yes
Monthly Girls' Nozaki-kun	2008, Gangan Online	5,600,000 (as of 2018)	1 manga series, 1 anime series, 1 OVA, 1 audio drama	Izumi Tsubaki	20	Yes
Pandora Hearts	2006, Monthly GFantasy	5,400,000 (as of 2018)	1 manga series, 1 anime series, 1 OVA	Jun Mochizuki	34	No
Spiral: The Bonds of Reasoning	2006, Young Gangan	5,200,000 (as of 2018)	2 manga series, 1 anime	Kyou Shirodaira, Eita Mizuno	25	No
Inu x Boku SS	2009, Gangan Joker	5,100,000 million (as of 2018)	1 manga series, 1 anime series, 1 ova	Cocoa Fujiwara	13	No
Durarara!!	2009, Monthly GFantasy	5,000,000 (light novel only, as of 2014)	2 manga series, 2 anime series, 2 light novels, 2 games	Ryohgo Narita, Akiyo Satorigi	65	Yes
Kakegurui	2014, Gangan Joker	5,000,000 (as of 2019)	4 manga series, 2 anime series, 2 TV Dramas, 1 live action movie	Homura Kawamoto, Tōru Naomura	24	Yes
Working!!	2004, Young Gangan	4,500,000 (as of 2018)	2 manga series, 4 anime series	Karino Takatsu	53	No
Haré+Guu	1997, Monthly Shōnen Gangan	3,900,000 (light novel only, as of 2015)	2 manga series, 1 anime series, 2 OVA	Renjuro Kindaichi	39	No
Kimi to Boku	2008, Monthly GFantasy	3,800,000 (as of 2018)	1 manga series, 2 anime series	Kiichi Hotta	26	Yes
Nagasarete Airantō	2004, Monthly Shōnen Gangan	3,700,000 (as of 2018)	1 manga series, 1 anime series, 1 light novel	Takeshi Fujishiro	26	Yes
Sekirei	2004, Young Gangan	3,400,000 (as of 2018)	1 manga series, 2 anime series, 1 game	Sakurako Gokurakuin	27	No
Bamboo Blade	2004, Young Gangan	3,300,000 (as of 2018)	4 manga series, 1 anime series, 1 game	Masahiro Totsuka, Aguri Igarashi	26	Yes
Akame ga Kill!	2010, Gangan Joker	3,200,000 (as of 2018)	3 manga series, 1 anime series	Takahiro, Tetsuya Tashiro	24	No
Nabari no Ou	2004, Monthly GFantasy	3,000,000 (as of 2018)	1 manga series, 2 anime series, 1 game	Yuhki Kamatani	26	No
Saiyuki	1997, Monthly GFantasy	5,084,000 (first 8 volumes)	4 manga series, 3 anime series, 4 ovas, 1 film, 2 games	Kazuya Minekura	109	Yes
Space Dandy	2013, Young Gangan		1 manga series, 1 anime series, 1 game	Masafumi Harada, Park Sung-woo, Red Ice	26	No
Hero Tales	2006, Monthly Shōnen Gangan	270,000	1 manga series, 1 anime series, 1 cancelled rpg game	Huang Jin Zhou, Hiromu Arakawa	26	No
Lagrange: The Flower of Rin-ne	2006, Young Gangan		1 manga series, 2 anime series, 1 OVA, 1 game	Shotaro Suga, Kimitake Yoshioka	26	No
Daily Lives of High School Boys	2009, Gangan Online	2,300,000	1 manga series, 1 anime series, 1 movie	Yasunobu Yamauchi	19	No
Blast of Tempest	2013, Monthly Shōnen Gangan	1,600,000	1 manga series, 1 anime series	Kyō Shirodaira, Arihide Sano, Ren Saizaki	24	No
Corpse Princess	2005, Monthly Shōnen Gangan	2,000,000	1 manga series, 1 anime series	Yoshiichi Akahito	26	No
Moribito: Guardian of the Spirit	1996, Monthly Shōnen Gangan		1 manga series, 1 anime series, 1 novel	Nahoko Uehashi, Kamui Fujiwara	26	Yes
Heroman	2009, Monthly Shōnen Gangan		1 manga series, 1 anime series, 1 novel	Stan Lee, Tamon Ohta	26	No
High School! Kimengumi	2001, Monthly Shōnen Gangan		4 manga series, 1 anime series, 1 novel, 1 movie	Motoei Shinzawa	86	No
Mamotte Shugogetten	1996, Monthly Shōnen Gangan	5,292,000 (as of 2016)	2 manga series, 1 anime series, 1 OVA	Minene Sakurano	30	No
The Mythical Detective Loki Ragnarok	2002, Monthly Shōnen Gangan	555,000 (first 4 volumes)	2 manga series, 1 anime series	Sakura Kinoshita	26	No
Ninpen Manmaru	1995, Monthly Shōnen Gangan	948,000 (first 6 volumes)	1 manga series, 1 anime series, 1 OVA, 1 Audio Drama	Mikio Igarashi	20	No
Peacemaker Kurogane	1999, Monthly Shōnen Gangan	5,000,000 (first 11 volumes)	2 manga series, 1 anime series	Nanae Chrono	24	Yes
The Comic Artist and His Assistants	2008, Monthly Shōnen Gangan	1,000,000	1 manga series, 1 anime series, 1 OVA, 1 Audio Drama	Hiroyuki	20	No
Tokyo Underground	1998, Monthly Shōnen Gangan	3,080,000 (first 9 volumes)	1 manga series, 1 anime series	Akinobu Uraku	26	No
Twin Signal	1992, Monthly Shōnen Gangan	1,304,000	1 manga series, 1 OVA	Sachi Oshimizu	3	No
UFO Ultramaiden Valkyrie	2002, Monthly Shōnen Gangan		1 manga series, 1 anime series, 1 OVA	Kaishaku	33	No
Umineko When They Cry	2007, Monthly Shōnen Gangan	6,000,000	4 manga series, 1 anime series, 1 OVA, 2 games	Various	26	Yes
Aoharu x Machinegun	2013, Monthly GFantasy		1 manga series, 1 anime series	NAOE	12	Yes
Cuticle Detective Inaba	2008, Monthly GFantasy	700,000	1 manga series, 1 anime series	Mochi	12	Yes
Dazzle	1999, Monthly GFantasy	1,000,000	1 manga series, 1 anime series	Minari Endoh	10	Yes
Devil Survivor 2: The Animation	1999, Monthly GFantasy		1 manga series, 1 anime series, 1 light novel	Makoto Uezu, Haruto Shiota	10	No
E's	1997, Monthly GFantasy	1,900,000 (first 13 volumes)	1 manga series, 1 anime series, 2 light novels	Satoru Yuiga	26	No
Gestalt	1997, Monthly GFantasy		1 manga series, 1 OVA	Yun Kōga	3	No
Higurashi When They Cry	2005, Monthly GFantasy	10,000,000	1 manga series, 2 anime series, 1 game, 1 light novel, 1 live action movie, 3 OVAs, 2 TV Dramas	Various	28	No
Hori-san to Miyamura-kun	2007, Monthly GFantasy	2,440,000 (first 8 volumes)	2 manga series, 1 anime series	HERO, Daisuke Hagiwara	3	Yes
Pani Poni	2009, Monthly GFantasy	1,256,000 (first 9 volumes)	1 manga series, 1 anime series, 1 OVA	Hekiru Hikawa	27	No
Switch	2002, Monthly GFantasy	277,000	1 manga series, 1 OVA	Saki Otoh, Tomomi Nakamura	2	No
Zombie-Loan	2007, Monthly GFantasy	1,000,000	1 manga series, 1 anime series	Peach-Pit	13	No
He Is My Master	2002, Monthly Shōnen Gangan	704,000	1 manga series, 1 anime series	Mattsu, Asu Tsubaki	12	No
Doubt	2007, Monthly Shōnen Gangan	704,000	3 manga series, 1 live-action film	Yoshiki Tonogai	0	No
Astro Fighter Sunred	2005, Young Gangan	1,600,000	1 manga series, 2 anime series	Makoto Kubota	52	No
Black God	2005, Young Gangan	1,600,000	1 manga series, 1 anime series	Lim Dall-young, Park Sung-woo	24	No
Black God	2007, Young Gangan		2 manga series, 2 anime series, 1 ova	Tensai Okamura	42	No
Dimension W	2011, Young Gangan		1 manga series, 1 anime series	Tensai Okamura	13	No
Black God	2006, Young Gangan		1 manga series, 1 anime series	Yuto	12	No
Mononoke	2007, Young Gangan		2 manga series, 1 anime series	Ninagawa Yaeko	12	No
Is It Wrong to Try to Pick Up Girls in a Dungeon?	2007, Young Gangan		3 manga series, 1 anime series, 2 light novel, 1 ova	Fujino Ōmori, Kunieda, Masaya Takamura	14	Yes
Sumomomo Momomo	2004, Young Gangan	219,8000	1 manga series, 1 anime series, 1 ova	Shinobu Ohtaka	24	No
Aria the Scarlet Ammo	2010, Young Gangan	7,000,000	2 manga series, 2 anime series, 1 light novel, 1 ova	Shogako Tachibana	25	Yes
Day Break Illusion	2013, Gangan Online		1 manga series, 1 anime series, 1 light novel	sole;viola, Kōki Katō	14	No
Chronicles of the Going Home Club	2011, Gangan Online		1 manga series, 1 anime series	Kuroha	12	No
The Morose Mononokean	2011, Gangan Online		1 manga series, 1 anime series	Kiri Wazawa	13	Yes
WataMote	2011, Gangan Online	1,960,000 (first 5 volumes)	2 manga series, 1 anime series	Nico Tanigawa	12	Yes
The Witch's Servant and the Demon Lord's Horns	2014, Monthly Shōnen Gangan		2 manga series, 1 novel	Mochi	0	Yes
Chivalry of a Failed Knight	2013, Gangan Online	1,300,000	2 manga series, 1 anime series	Various	12	Yes
Tanaka-kun is Always Listless	2014, Gangan Online	1,500,000	1 manga series, 1 anime series, 1 ova	Nozomi Uda	14	No
Book Girl	2006, Gangan Joker		3 manga series, 2 ova, 1 light novel, 1 movie	Mizuki Nomura, Rito Kōsaka, Akira Hiyoshimaru	4	No
Dusk Maiden of Amnesia	2008, Gangan Joker		1 manga series, 1 anime series	Maybe	13	No
Grimgar of Fantasy and Ash	2013, Gangan Joker		1 manga series, 1 anime series, 1 ova	Mutsumi Okubashi	13	Yes
Gugure! Kokkuri-san	2011, Gangan Joker	1,740,000 Gugure!	1 manga series, 1 anime series	Midori Endō	12	No
Natsu no Arashi!	2006, Gangan Joker		1 manga series, 2 anime series	Jin Kobayashi	26	No
One Week Friends	2012, Gangan Joker	1,500,000	1 manga series, 1 anime series, 1 movie	Matcha Hazuki	12	No
Oreshura	2011, Gangan Joker		4 manga series, 1 anime series, 1 light novel	Various	13	Yes
My Bride is a Mermaid	2002, Gangan Joker	1,600,000 (first 12 volumes)	1 manga series, 1 anime series, 1 ova	Tahiko Kimura	28	No
ACCA: 13-ku Kansatsu-ka	2013, Monthly Big Gangan		1 manga series, 1 anime series	Natsume Ono		No
Servant × Service	2011, Monthly Big Gangan	640,000	1 manga series, 1 anime series	Natsume Ono	13	No
Scum's Wish	2011, Monthly Big Gangan	1,000,000	1 manga series, 1 anime series	Mengo Yokoyari	12	No
Mahoraba	2000, Monthly Gangan Wing	1,694,000	1 manga series, 1 anime series	Akira Kojima	26	No
Undefeated Bahamut Chronicle	2013, Gangan Online	1,000,000	1 manga series, 1 anime series	Senri Akatsuki, Itsuki Watanabe, Fumi Tadaura	12	Yes

== Square Enix manga with no anime ==
- I Think Our Son Is Gay
