= Gangan Comics =

Manga imprint by Square Enix

Gangan Comics ガンガンコミックス
- Parent company: Enix (1991–2003); Square Enix (2003–present)
- Status: Active
- Founded: 1991; 35 years ago
- Country of origin: Japan
- Headquarters location: Tokyo, Japan
- Distribution: Japan
- Publication types: Manga, magazines, light novels, graphic novels
- Fiction genres: Shōnen manga, seinen manga
- Official website: magazine.jp.square-enix.com/gangan/

Gangan (ガンガン, Gangan) is a manga imprint owned by Square Enix. It originated as a manga imprint for Enix before the company merged with Square to form Square Enix. It publishes manga in several anthologies aimed at different reader demographic groups in the Japanese market. Its anthologies are home to some popular Square Enix manga series which were adapted into anime series, like Fullmetal Alchemist, Moribito: Guardian of the Spirit, Nabari no Ou, Inu x Boku SS, The Case Study of Vanitas and Soul Eater. The comics are later collected in paperback volumes under brand names such as Gangan Comics (ガンガンコミックス, Gangan Komikkusu), Gangan Comics Joker (ガンガンコミックスJOKER, Gangan Komikkusu Jōkā) and Young Gangan Comics (ヤングガンガンコミックス, Yangu Gangan Komikkusu), which identify the anthology of serialisation. These paperback brand names are formed by omitting any gekkan (月刊; monthly publication) or shōnen (少年; boy) in the magazine name and inserting Comics (コミックス, Komikkusu) directly after the word Gangan.

== Anthologies ==
=== Monthly Shōnen Gangan (since 1991) ===
Monthly Shōnen Gangan
- Monthly Shōnen Gangan (08/2021 issue)
- Categories: Shōnen manga
- Frequency: Monthly
- First issue: March 12, 1991 (April 1991)
- Company: Enix (1991–2003); Square Enix (2003–present)
- Country: Japan
- Language: Japanese
- Website: gangan.square-enix.co.jp

Monthly Shōnen Gangan (月刊少年ガンガン, Gekkan Shōnen Gangan) is a monthly manga anthology that regularly has over 600 pages. Shōnen Gangan was launched by Enix (now Square Enix) in 1991, to compete with other magazines such as Monthly Shōnen Magazine, Monthly Shōnen Jump and Shōnen Sunday Super, and is targeted toward the same young teen male demographic (shōnen means "young boy"). It features manga with much action and adventure; science fiction and fantasy elements in the stories are very common. Square Enix also publishes the related Gangan YG and Monthly Gangan Wing.

==== Series ====
Manga	First Issue	Author
Eiyū Kyōshitsu (英雄教室)	September 2016	Shin Araki, Koara Kishida
Final Fantasy Lost Stranger (ファイナルファンタジー ロスト・ストレンジャー)	July 2017	Hazuki Minase, Itsuki Kameya
Futoku no Guild (不徳のギルド)	June 2017	Taichi Kawazoe
Nagasarete Airantō (ながされて藍蘭島)	January 2002	Takeshi Fujishiro
Ojisama to Neko (おじさまと猫)	April 2019	Umi Sakurai
Sentai Red Isekai de Boukensha ni Naru (戦隊レッド 異世界で冒険者になる)	October 2020	Koyoshi Nakayoshi
Toaru Majutsu no Index (とある魔術の禁書目録)	April 2007	Kazuma Kamachi, Chuya Kogino
Ura Sekai Picnic (裏世界ピクニック)	February 2018	Iori Miyazawa, Eita Mizuno
Yomi no Tsugai (黄泉のツガイ)	December 2021	Hiromu Arakawa

Manga and series featured:

- 666 Satan (O-Parts Hunter) (Seishi Kishimoto) (completed)
- Akuma Jiten (Shinya Suyama)
- Beelzebub-jou no Oki ni Mesu mama. (matoba)
- B. Ichi (Atsushi Okubo)
- Blade Sangokushi (Ryuunosuke Ichikawa, Taiyou Makabe)
- Blast of Tempest (Kyō Shirodaira, Ren Saizaki) (completed)
- Bloody Cross (Shiwo Komeyama)
- Choko Beast!! (Rin Asano)
- Code Age Archives (Yusuke Naora)
- Corpse Princess (Yoshiichi Akahito)
- Crimson Prince (Souta Kuwahara)
- Doubt (Yoshiki Tonogai) (completed)
- Dragon Quest: Eden no Senshitachi (Kamui Fujiwara)
- Dragon Quest Monsters + (Mine Yoshizaki)
- Dragon Quest Retsuden: Roto no Monshō (Kamui Fujiwara)
- Evil Crusher Maya (Masami Kurumada)
- Final Fantasy Crystal Chronicles: Hatenaki Sora no Mukou ni (Ryunosuke Ichikawa)
- Final Fantasy Type-0 (Takatoshi Shiozawa)
- Final Fantasy Type-0 Gaiden: The Icy Blade of Death (Takatoshi Shiozawa)
- Fullmetal Alchemist (Hiromu Arakawa) (completed)
- Guardian Eito (Mine Yoshizaki)
- Guardian of the Spirit (Nahoko Uehashi, Kamui Fujiwara) (completed)
- Handa-kun (Satsuki Yoshino) (completed)
- Happy Boy (Tatsuya Egawa)
- Haré+Guu (Jungle wa Itsumo Hare nochi Gū & Hare Guu) (Renjuro Kindaichi)
- Hazama no Uta (Kaishaku)
- Heroman (Stan Lee, Tamon Ōta)
- Jūshin Enbu (Hiromu Arakawa) (originally Gangan Powered) (completed)
- Hidamari no Pinyu (Misaki Ogawa)
- Flash! Funny-face Club (Motoei Shinzawa)
- Higurashi no Naku Koro ni: Himatsubushi-hen (Yoshiki Tonogai, Ryukishi07)
- It's a Wonderful World (Shiro Amano)
- Im: Great Priest Imhotep (Makoto Morishita)
- Judge (Yoshiki Tonogai)
- Kingdom Hearts (Shiro Amano)
- Kingdom Hearts: Chain of Memories (Shiro Amano)
- Kingdom Hearts 358/2 Days (Shiro Amano)
- Kingdom Hearts II (Shiro Amano)
- Kurenai Ouji (Souta Kuwahara)
- Luno (Kei Toume)
- Maboroshi no Daichi (Masomi Kanzaki)
- Mahōjin Guru Guru (Hiroyuki Etou)
- Mamotte Shugogetten (Minene Sakurano)
- Material Puzzle (Masahiro Totsuka) (completed)
- Matantei Loki (Sakura Kinoshita) (completed)
- Megalomania (Daisuke Hiyama)
- Meteo Emblem (Park Sung-woo)
- Miss Shachiku and the Little Baby Ghost (Imari Arita)
- Ninpen Manmaru (Mikio Igarashi) (completed)
- Onikiri-sama no Hakoiri Musume (Akinobu Uraku)
- Ousama no Mimi Okonomimi (Kei Natsumi)
- Ore no Kanojo ni Nanika Youkai (Karino Takatsu)
- Papuwa & Nangoku Shōnen Papuwa-kun (Ami Shibata)
- Peace Maker (Nanae Chrono) (completed)
- Phantom Dead or Alive (Michiaki Watanabe)
- Red Raven (Shinta Fujimoto)
- Rokushou! (Sakurako Gokurakuin)
- Saga of Queen Knight (Tomohiro Shimomura)
- Shugen Byakuryū Rubikura (Ryūsuke Mita)
- Soul Eater (Atsushi Ōkubo) (completed)
- Soul Eater Not! (Atsushi Ōkubo) (completed)
- Spiral: Suiri no Kizuna (Eita Mizuno, Kyo Shirodaira)
- Spiral Alive (Eita Mizuno, Kyo Shirodaira)
- Star Ocean: Blue Sphere (Aoi Mizuki)
- Star Ocean: The Second Story (Mayumi Azuma)
- Star Ocean: Till the End of Time (Akira Kanda)
- Straykeys (Tarō Yuzunoki)
- Talentless Nana (Looseboy, Iori Furuya)
- The Comic Artist and Assistants (Hiroyuki) (completed)
- Today's Cerberus (Ato Sakurai) (completed)
- Tokyo Fantasy Gakuen Yuushaka: Rua no Noel (Kaishaku)
- Tokyo Underground (Akinobu Uraka) (completed)
- Totsugeki! Papparatai (Natsuki Matsuzawa)
- Tozasareta Nerugaru (Rumi Aruma)
- Tripeace (Maru Tomoyuki)
- Twin Signal (Sachi Oshimizu) (completed)
- UFO Ultramaiden Valkyrie (Kaishaku) (completed)
- Umineko no Naku Koro Ni: Episode 07 - Requiem of the Golden Witch (Ryukishi07, Eita Mizuno) (completed)
- Vampire Juuji Kai (Yuri Kimura, Kyo Shirodaira) (completed)
- Val × Love (Ryosuke Asakura) (completed)
- Vermeil in Gold (Kouta Amana, Youko Umezu)
- Violinist of Hameln (Michiaki Watanabe) (completed)
- Watashi no Messiah-sama (Suu Minazuki) (completed)
- Z MAN (Hideaki Nishikawa)

=== Monthly GFantasy (since 1993) ===
Monthly GFantasy (月刊Gファンタジー, Gekkan Jī Fantajī), also known as Gangan Fantasy, is a Japanese shōnen manga magazine. It launched in 1992 as a special issue of Shounen Gangan under the name Fantastic Comic (ファンタスティックコミック). In 1993 it became its own magazine under the name of Monthly Gangan Fantasy (月刊ガンガンファンタジー). In the April 1994 issue it was renamed to GFantasy. The manga tend to be set in a fantasy setting with large amounts of supernatural themes and a fair amount of action and/or horror scenes. Additionally, the publisher has indicated on its Manga Up! website that certain series published within the magazine are aimed at girls.

Manga featured:

- 10-4 (Hashiba Maki)
- A Terrified Teacher at Ghoul School! (Mai Tanaka)
- Aoharu × Machinegun (NAOE)
- Assistant Teacher at a Girls Magic Academy (Go Todo, Sakura Fujimoto)
- Black Butler (Yana Toboso) (ongoing)
- Crimson-Shell (Jun Mochizuki)
- Cuticle Detective Inaba (Mochi)
- D-Drops (Seana)
- Daisuke! (Hasu Kikuzuki)
- Devil Survivor 2: The Animation (Makoto Uezu)
- Disney Twisted-Wonderland The Comic: Episode of Heartslabyul (Wakana Hazuki, Sumire Kowono)
- Disney Twisted-Wonderland The Comic: Episode of Savanaclaw (Suzuka Oda) (ongoing)
- Durarara!! (Ryōgo Narita, Akiyo Satorigi (volumes 1–10), Aogiri (volume 11-present)
- E's (Satoru Yuiga)
- Fire Emblem: Ankoku Ryū to Hikari no Ken (Maki Hakoda)
- Fire Emblem: Gaiden (Maki Hakoda)
- Fire Emblem: Seisen no Keifu (Nattu Fujimori)
- Fire Emblem: Thracia 776 (Yūna Takanagi)
- From the Red Fog (Mosae Nohara) (ongoing)
- Gestalt (Yun Kōga)
- Graineliers (Rihito Takarai)
- Higurashi no Naku Koro ni: Minagoroshi-hen (Hinase Momoyama, Ryukishi07)
- Higurashi no Naku Koro ni: Tatarigoroshi-hen (Jiro Suzuki, Ryukishi07)
- Higurashi no Naku Koro ni: Yoigoshi-hen (Side Story) (Mimori, Ryukishi07)
- Horimiya (HERO, Daisuke Hagiwara)
- I, Otaku: Struggle in Akihabara (Sōta-kun no Akihabara Funtōki) (Jiro Suzuki)
- The Irregular at Magic High School (Fumino Hayashi)
- The Beautiful Deity (Yomoko Yamamoto)
- Kamiyomi (Ami Shibata)
- Kimi to Boku (Kiichi Hotta)
- Lammermoor no Shōnen Kiheitai (Nana Natsunishi)
- The Legend of Zelda: A Link to the Past (Ataru Cagiva)
- The Legend of Zelda: Link's Awakening (Ataru Cagiva)
- Monokuro Kitan (Kusu Rinka)
- Nabari no Ou (Yuhki Kamatani)
- Pandora Hearts (Jun Mochizuki)
- Pani Poni (Hekiru Hikawa)
- Revenger (Ryūsei Yamada)
- Rust Blaster (Yana Toboso)
- Skate-Leading Stars (Chiaki Nagaoka, Sumika Sumio)
- Tales of Reincarnation in Maydare: This World's Worst Witch (Midori Yuma, Nana Natsunishi) (ongoing)
- The Daily Life of a Middle-Aged Online Shopper in Another World (Hifumi Asakawa, Umiharu) (ongoing)
- The Royal Tutor (Higasa Akai)
- Toilet-Bound Hanako-kun (Iro Aida) (ongoing)
- Tokyo Aliens (NAOE) (ongoing)
- Saiyuki (Kazuya Minekura)
- Saiyuki Gaiden (Kazuya Minekura) (2002, moved to Monthly Comic Zero Sum)
- Switch (naked ape)
- Teiden Shōjo to Hanemushi no Orchestra (Ninomiya Ai)
- Torikago Gakkyuu (Shin Mashiba)
- Yumekui Kenbun (Shin Mashiba)
- Zombie-Loan (Peach-Pit)

=== Young Gangan (since 2004) ===
Young Gangan (ヤングガンガン, Yangu Gangan) is a Japanese seinen manga magazine published by Square Enix every other week on Friday. The magazine was first published on December 3, 2004.

Manga featured:

- Amigo x Amiga (Takahiro Seguchi)
- Arakawa Under the Bridge (Hikaru Nakamura) (completed)
- Astro Fighter Sunred (Makoto Kubota)
- Bamboo Blade (Aguri Igarashi, Masahiro Totsuka) (completed)
- Beauty and the Feast (Satomi U) (completed)
- Bitter Virgin (Kei Kusunoki) (completed)
- Black God (Park Sung-woo, Dall-Young Lim) (completed)
- Darker than Black: Shikkoku no Hana (Yūji Iwahara)
- Dead Mount Death Play (Ryohgo Narita, Shinta Fujimoto)
- Dimension W (Yūji Iwahara) (switched over to Monthly Gangan in November 2015)
- Dōsei Recipe (Towa Oshima)
- Donyatsu (Yūsuke Kozaki)
- Drop Kick
- Front Mission Dog Life and Dog Style/Front Mission The Drive (Yasuo Ohtagaki)
- Fudanshism (Morishige)
- Goodbye, Eden (Zero Ainan) (completed)
- Hanamaru Kindergarten (Yuto) (completed)
- Hohzuki Island (Sanbe Kei) (completed)
- Iroha-saka, Agatte Sugu (Yuto)
- Jackals (Kim Byung Jin, Shinya Murata) (completed)
- Kiba no Tabishounin (Park Joong-Gi), (Nanatsuki Kyouchi)
- Manhole (Tsutsui Tetsuya) (completed)
- Mononoke (Ninagawa Yaeko) (completed)
- Mouryou no Yurikago (Kei Sanbe)
- My Awkward Senpai (Makoto Kudo)
- My Dress-Up Darling (Shinichi Fukuda)
- Nikoichi (Renjuro Kindaichi)
- Rinne no Lagrange - Akatsuki no Memoria (Yoshioka Kimitake)
- Saki (Ritsu Kobayashi) (ongoing)
- Sekirei (Ashika Sakura) (completed)
- Shishunki no Iron Maiden (Watanabe Shizumu) (ongoing)
- Space☆Dandy (Masafumi Harada), (Park Sung-woo), (RED ICE)
- Sumomomo Momomo (Shinobu Ohtaka) (completed)
- The Comic Artist and Assistants (Hiroyuki) (completed)
- The Comic Artist and Assistants 2 (Hiroyuki) (completed)
- The Executioner and Her Way of Life (Mato Sato, Ryo Mitsuya)
- The iDOLM@STER Cinderella Girls Ensemble!, Sadoru Chiba & Haruki Kashiba (ongoing)
- Übel Blatt (Etorouji Shiono)
- Übel Blatt Gaiden (Etorouji Shiono)
- Umeboshi (Maya Koikeda)
- Until Death Do Us Part (DOUBLE-S, Hiroshi Takashige) (completed)
- Violinist of Hameln: Shchelkunchik (Michiaki Watanabe) (completed)
- Working!! (Karino Takatsu)

=== Gangan Online (since 2008) ===
Gangan Online (ガンガンオンライン, Gangan Onrain) is a free manga and light novel web magazine and smartphone app published and updated by Square Enix. The online web magazine was activated on October 2, 2008.

Manga featured:

- Adachi to Shimamura (Author:Mani, artist: Non) (manga adaption started in 2016)
- Ai wa Noroi no Nihon Ningyou (Kiki Suihei)
- Alba Rose no Neko (KARASU)
- Asao-san to Kurata-kun (Hero)
- Amanonadeshiko (Haruka Ogataya)
- Aphorism (Karuna Kujo) (originally Gangan Wing)
- Are You Okay With a Slightly Older Girlfriend? (Kota Nozomi, Enya Uraki)
- Assassin & Cinderella (Yuzo Natsuno)
- Barakamon (Satsuki Yoshino) (completed)
- Buyuuden Kita Kita (Hiroyuki Etou)
- Chokotto Hime (Ayami Kazama) (originally Gangan Wing)
- Cyoku! (Nico Tanigawa)
- Daily Lives of High School Boys (Yamauchi Yasunobu) (completed)
- Day Break Illusion (Kōki Katō) (completed)
- En Passant (Taro Yuzunoki)
- Esoragoto (usi)
- Gōkon ni Ittara Onna ga Inakatta Hanashi (Nana Aokawa)
- Hayachine! (Aiko Fukumorita) (completed)
- Higurashi no Naku Koro ni Rei: Oniokoshi-hen (completed) and Higurashi no Naku Koro ni Rei: Irotoutoshi-hen (completed) (Kei Natsumi, Ryukishi07)
- Hori-san to Miyamura-kun Omake (HERO) (completed)
- How I Attended an All-Guy's Mixer (Nana Aokawa) (ongoing)
- Hyakuen! (Ema Tōyama)
- I'm a Maid, but I've Pulled Out the Holy Sword?! (Midori Akino, Genen, Fua Yamazaki)
- I'm Glad They Kicked Me From The Hero's Party... But Why're you following me, Great Saintess? (Renge Hatsueda, Pinko Kurimoto)
- Life is Money (author Asaniji Teru, artist Yaguraba Tekka)
- Karasu-tengu Ujyu (Iwanosuke Neguragi)
- Kitakubu Katsudō Kiroku (Kuroha)
- Kyou mo Machiwabite (Ichi Saeki)
- Kyousou no Simulacra (Hideaki Yoshimura)
- Monthly Girls' Nozaki-kun (Izumi Tsubaki) (ongoing)
- The Morose Mononokean (Kiri Wazawa) (completed)
- My Happy Marriage (Rito Kousaka, Akumi Agitogi) (ongoing)
- No Matter How I Look at It, It's You Guys' Fault I'm Not Popular! (Nico Tanigawa) (ongoing)
- Oji-chan Yuusha (Tarou Sakamoto)
- Pochi Gunsō (Mao Momiji, Akira)
- Princess of Mana (Seiken Densetsu: Princess of Mana) (Satsuki Yoshino) (originally Gangan Powered) (completed)
- RealPG (Yuki Domoto)
- Reincarnation of the Unrivalled Time Mage (Shusui Hazuki, Yui Sakumi) (ongoing)
- Ryuushika Ryuushika (Yoshitoshi ABe)
- Seitokai no Wotanoshimi. (Marumikan)
- Sengoku Sukuna (Nekotama)
- Shikisou (Akira Kanda)
- Shougakusei Host Pochi (SAORI)
- Sougiya Riddle (Akai Higasa)
- Suppose a Kid From the Last Dungeon Boonies Moved to a Starter Town
- The Gender of Mona Lisa (Tsumuji Yoshimura)
- The Ice Guy and His Cool Female Colleague (Miyuki Tonogaya) (ongoing)
- The iDOLM@STER Cinderella Girls Shuffle!! (Kouka Mijin) (ongoing)
- The Lady Likes a Nerd over Princes (Yuma Tosaka, Noyama Carpaccio)
- The Newbie Princess Doesn't Want a Game Over! (Shūmai Kogeta, Kensuke Koba, Omiomi) (ongoing)
- The Villainess' Butler: Death Flag Destroyer at Your Service (Hiironoame, Shobu, Yuichi Murakami)
- Tokyo Innocent (Naru Narumi) (originally Gangan Wing)
- Wa! (Akira Kojima)
- You Were Experienced, I Was Not: Our Dating Story (Makiko Nagaoka, Naoyama Carpaccio) (ongoing)

Light Novels featured:

=== Gangan Joker (since 2009) ===
Monthly Gangan Joker (月刊ガンガンJOKER, Gekkan Gangan Joker) is a Japanese shōnen manga anthology that was launched by Square Enix on April 22, 2009.

Manga featured:

- Akame ga Kill! (Takahiro, Tetsuya Tashiro) (completed)
- Book Girl and the Famished Spirit (Rito Kōsaka)
- Book Girl and the Suicidal Mime (Rito Kōsaka) (originally Gangan Powered)
- Bottom-tier Character Tomozaki (Eight Chida)
- Corpse Party: Blood Covered (Team Guriguri, adapted by Toshimi Shinomiya) (originally Gangan Powered)
- Dusk Maiden of Amnesia (Maybe) (completed)
- Damekko Kissa Dear (Ryōta Yuzuki)
- Dragon and Chameleon (Ryo Ishiyama)
- Eighth (Izumi Kawachi)
- Grimgar of Fantasy and Ash (Mutsumi Okubashi)
- Gugure! Kokkuri-san (Midori Endō) (completed)
- Hanasaku Iroha (Author:P.A. Works, artist: Eito Chida) (completed)
- Happy Sugar Life (Tomiyaki Kagisori) (completed)
- Himawari (Blank-Note, adapted by Daisuke Hiyama)
- Inu x Boku SS (Cocoa Fujiwara) (completed)
- The Great Jahy Will Not Be Defeated! (Wakame Konbu) (ongoing)
- Kakegurui - Compulsive Gambler (Tōru Naomura, Homura Kawamoto) (ongoing)
- Love x Rob x Stockholm (Hiroki Haruse)
- Manabiya (Akira Kojima)
- Miss Miyazen Would Love to Get Closer to You (Akitaka)
- My Bride Is a Mermaid (Tahiko Kimura) (originally Gangan Wing) (completed)
- My Clueless First Friend (Taku Kawamura) (ongoing)
- My First Times with Suwa-san (Yasuka Manuma)
- Natsu no Arashi! (Jin Kobayashi) (originally Gangan Wing) (completed)
- NEET Princess Terrass (Tomohiro Shimomura)
- One Week Friends (Matcha Hazuki) (completed)
- Ore no Kanojo to Osananajimi ga Shuraba Sugiru (Nanasuke)
- Prunus Girl
- Ragna Crimson (Daiki Kobayashi)
- rail aile bleue (Kazuyoshi Karasawa)
- Satsui no Senki (Kobayashi Daiki)
- Sengoku Strays (Shingo Nanami) (originally Gangan Wing)
- Shibuya Goldfish (Hiroumi Aoi)
- Shinigami-sama ni Saigo no Onegai wo (YAMAGUCHI Mikoto)
- Shitsurakuen (Tōru Naomura) (completed)
- The Case Study of Vanitas (Jun Mochizuki) (ongoing)
- The Girl I Like Forgot Her Glasses (Koume Fujichika) (completed)
- The iDOLM@STER Cinderella Girls New Generations, namo (ongoing)
- The Maid I Hired Recently Is Mysterious (Wakame Konbu)
- Today's Great Satan II (Yūichi Hiiragi)
- Umineko no Naku Koro ni (Kei Natsumi, Ryukishi07) (originally Gangan Powered)
- Watashi no Tomodachi ga Motenai no wa dō Kangaetemo Omaera ga Warui. (Nico Tanigawa)
- Yandere Kanojo (Shinobi)
- Yowai 5000-nen no Sōshoku Dragon, Iwarenaki Jaryū Nintei (Kōichi Muro) (completed)

=== Monthly Big Gangan (since 2010) ===
Monthly Big Gangan is a seinen manga publication entry in Square Enix's Gangan imprint.

Manga featured:

- ACCA: 13-Territory Inspection Dept. (Natsume Ono) (completed)
- Akame ga Kill! Zero (Toru Kei) (artist) (Takahiro) (writer) (completed)
- Bamboo Blade C (Takao Jingu) (artist) (Totsuka Masahiro) (writer) (completed)
- Candy Pop Nightmare (Hikawa Hekiru) (completed)
- Deep Insanity: Nirvana (Etorouji Shiono) (artist) (Norimitsu Kaihō and Makoto Fukami) (writer) (completed)
- Dimension W (Yūji Iwahara) (switched over from Monthly Gangan in November 2015) (completed)
- Goblin Slayer (Kurose Kousuke) (artist) (Kumo Kagyu) (writer) (ongoing)
- Gokusotsu Kraken (Toru Kei) (artist) (Takahiro) (writer) (ongoing)
- Ginsai no Kawa (Kurata Uso) (artist) (Kayashima Nozomi) (writer) (completed)
- High Score Girl (Rensuke Oshikiri) (completed)
- Higurashi no Naku Koro ni Rei: Hoshiwatashi-hen (Seigo Tokiya, Ryukishi07) (completed)
- Magical Girl Spec-Ops Asuka (Seigo Tokiya) (artist) (Makoto Fukami) (writer) (completed)
- MonsTABOO (TALI) (artist) (Yuya Takahashi) (writer) (completed)
- Moscow 2160 (Kotaro Sekine) (artist) (Noboru Kannatsuki) (character designs) (Kumo Kagyu) (ongoing)
- Reincarnated as the Daughter of the Legendary Hero and the Queen of Spirits (Yutaka Ohhori) (artist) (Matsuura) (writer) (ongoing)
- Shimekiri Mae ni wa Yuri ga Hakadoru (Saki Sakida) (artist) (Manatsu Suzuki) (writer) (ongoing)
- Shiori Experience (Yu-ko Osada) (Artist) (Machida Kazuya) (Writer) (ongoing)
- Smoking Behind the Supermarket with You (Jinushi) (ongoing)
- Songuri! (Fujisaki Yuu) (completed)
- Star Wars: Visions (Kamome Shirahama, Haruichi, Yusuke Õsawa, Keisuke Sato)
- Tales of Wedding Rings (Maybe) (completed)
- The Apothecary Diaries (Nekokurage) (artist) (Hyūganatsu and Ikki Nanao) (writers) (ongoing)
- The Greatest Demon Lord Is Reborn as a Typical Nobody (Misuho Kotoba) (artist) (Myōjin Katō) (writer) (completed)
- The Mandalorian (Yusuke Ōsawa) (ongoing)
- Tohyo Game: One Black Ballot to You (Tatsuhiko) (artist) (G.O. and Chihiro) (writers) (completed)
- Übel Blatt (Etorouji Shiono) (completed)
- The Vexations of a Shut-In Vampire Princess (Riichu) (artist) (Kotei Kobayashi) (writer)

=== Gangan Pixiv (since 2017) ===
On February 22, 2017, Gangan Pixiv was launched as a collaboration between Pixiv and Square Enix.

- A Man and His Cat
- Cherry Magic! Thirty Years of Virginity Can Make You a Wizard?! (ongoing)
- I Think Our Son Is Gay
- Mr. Villain's Day Off (ongoing)
- One Room of Happiness
- Play It Cool, Guys (ongoing)
- The Ice Guy and His Cool Female Colleague (ongoing)
- Demon and Song

=== Manga UP! (since 2017) ===
Like Gangan Online, Manga Up! is a manga app and website which serializes a lot of popular media mix works with manga adaptations of novels exclusively published on the service. In July 2022, Square Enix launched an English version of the Manga UP! featuring titles from Manga UP! and other Square Enix magazines.

- A Dating Sim of Life or Death
- Academia Eorzea
- Always a Catch
- Beast Tamer
- By the Grace of the Gods
- Cheat Mode Farming in Another World
- Chitose is in the Ramune Bottle
- Demoted to a Teacher, the Strongest Sage Raises an Unbeatable Class
- Do It Yourself!!
- Engage Kiss
- Final Boss Fake-out: The Protagonist Thinks He Killed Me So Now I'm Free!
- From Leveling Up the Hero to Leveling Up a Nation
- How to Survive a Thousand Deaths: Accidentally Wooing Everyone as an Ex-gamer Made Villainess!
- I Became a Legend After My 10 Year-Long Last Stand
- I Got Reincarnated as a Son of Innkeepers!
- I Kissed My Girlfriend's Little Sister?!
- I Lost My Adventurer's License, but It's Fine Because I Have an Adorable Daughter Now
- I Time-Traveled and Confessed to My Teacher Crush
- I'm an Alchemist Who Doesn't Know How OP I Am
- I'm Not Even an NPC in This Otome Game!
- In Her Fifth Life, the Villainess Lives With the Evil Dragon -The Evil Dragon of Ruin Wants to Spoil His Bride-
- Ketsugō Danshi: Elements with Emotions
- Killer Alchemist -Assassinations in Another World-
- Level 0 Demon King Becomes an Adventurer in Another World
- My Adventurer Life: I Became the Strongest Magic-Refining Sage in a New World
- My Friend's Little Sister Has It In for Me!
- My Isekai Life
- Revolutionary Restart for The Blue Rose Princess
- Sabikui Bisco
- Sakugan
- Selection Project
- The Amazing Village Creator: Slow Living with the Village Building Cheat Skill
- The Angel Next Door Spoils Me Rotten
- The Diofield Chronicle
- The Genius Prince's Guide to Raising a Nation Out of Debt
- The Girl I Saved on the Train Turned Out to Be My Childhood Friend
- The Greatest Magicmaster's Retirement Plan: The Alternative
- The Isekai Returnee is Too OP for the Modern World
- The Misfit of Demon King Academy
- The Perks of Working in the Black Magic Industry
- The Reincarnated Prince Becomes an Alchemist and Brings Prosperity to His Country
- The Strongest Sage With the Weakest Crest
- The Strongest Swordsman Has Zero Equipment Slots, but He Can Equip up to 9999 Items if It's (Cute) Cursed Equipment
- The Strongest Tank's Labyrinth Raids
- The Strongest Wizard Making Full Use of the Strategy Guide -No Taking Orders, I'll Slay the Demon King My Own Way-
- Wandering Witch: The Journey of Elaina
- YoRHa – Pearl Harbor Descent Record – A NieR:Automata Story

=== Gangan BLiss (since 2021) ===
In September 2021, Square Enix launched Gangan BLiss, a manga label dedicated to publishing boy's love manga. The manga published under this label are serialized on the CMOA website.

- Love in the Palm of His Hand
- Mobsters in Love
- Ōkami wa Tantei wo Tabetai
- Ore no Hanamuko wa Omae Janai
- Shota Oni (ongoing)

== Discontinued magazines ==
=== Gangan Powered (2001–2009) ===
Gangan Powered (ガンガンパワード, Gangan Pawādo) was a Japanese shōnen/seinen manga magazine published by Square Enix. The last release of the magazine was with the April 2009 issue sold on February 21, 2009, and it was subsequently replaced by Gangan Joker.

Manga featured:

- Blan no Shokutaku ~Bloody Dining~ (Tsubasa Hazuki, Shogo Mukai) (completed)
- Book Girl and the Suicidal Mime (Miho Takeoka)
- Final Fantasy XII (Gin Amou)
- Jūshin Enbu (Hiromu Arakawa)
- HEAVEN (Aoi Nanase) (completed)
- Higurashi no Naku Koro ni: Onikakushi-hen (completed), Tsumihoroboshi-hen (completed), and Matsuribayashi-hen (Karin Suzuragi, Ryukishi07)
- He Is My Master (Asu Tsubaki, Mattsu)
- Kimi to Boku (Kiichi Hotta)
- Nusunde Ri-Ri-Su (Tinker)
- Princess of Mana (Seiken Densetsu: Princess of Mana) (Satsuki Yoshino)
- Shining Tears (Akira Kanda) (completed)
- Superior (Ichtys)
- Umineko no Naku Koro ni (Kei Natsumi, Ryukishi07)

=== Monthly Gangan Wing (1996–2009) ===
Monthly Gangan Wing (月刊ガンガンWING, Gekkan Gangan Wing) was a Japanese shōnen manga magazine published by Square Enix. The last release of the magazine was with the May 2009 issue sold on March 21, 2009, and it was subsequently replaced by Gangan Joker.

Manga featured:

- Alice on Deadlines (Shiro Ihara)
- Brothers (Yoshiki Naruse)
- Aphorism (Karuna Kujo)
- Ark (Nea Fuyuki)
- dear (Cocoa Fujiwara)
- Chokotto Hime (Ayami Kazama)
- Enchanter (Izumi Kawachi)
- Fire Emblem Hikari wo Tsugumono (Nea Fuyuki)
- Higurashi no Naku Koro ni: Watanagashi-hen and Meakashi-hen (Yutori Hōjō, Ryukishi07)
- Ignite (Sasa Hiiro)
- Kon Jirushi (Toyotaro Kon)
- Mahoraba (Akira Kojima)
- Majipikoru (Kanoto Kinatsu)
- Natsu no Arashi! (Jin Kobayashi)
- NecromanciA (Hamashin)
- Otoshite Appli Girl (Kako Mochizuki)
- Sai Drill (Izumi Kawachi)
- Sengoku Strays (Shingo Nanami)
- My Bride Is a Mermaid (Tahiko Kimura)
- Stamp Dead (Kanoto Kinatsu)
- Shyo Shyo Rika (Takumi Uesugi)
- Tales of Eternia (Yoko Koike) (completed)
- Tenshou Yaoyorozu (Kanoto Kinatsu)
- Tokyo Innocent (Naru Narumi)
- Vampire Savior: Tamashii no Mayoigo (Mayumi Azuma) (completed)
- Warasibe (Satoru Matsuba)
- Watashi no Messiah-sama (Suu Minazuki)
- Watashi no Ookami-san (Cocoa Fujiwara)

== See also ==
- List of manga magazines
- List of Square Enix manga franchises
