= Aikawa (surname) =

Aikawa (written: 相川, 愛川, 愛河, 哀川, 會川 or 鮎川) is a Japanese surname. Notable people with the surname include:

- Kanata Aikawa (相川奏多; born 2004), Japanese voice actress
- Haruka Aikawa (相川 春香; born 1994), Japanese women's professional shogi player
- Hiroki Aikawa (愛川 ヒロキ; born 1963), male Japanese popular music artist and composer
- Nanase Aikawa (相川 七瀬; born 1975), Japanese musician
- Rikako Aikawa (愛河 里花子; born 1967), Japanese voice actress (real name is Honami Iwata)
- Ryoji Aikawa (相川 亮二; born 1976), Japanese baseball player
- Show Aikawa (哀川 翔; born 1961), Japanese composer and actor (also known as Sho Aikawa)
- Sho Aikawa (screenwriter) (會川 昇; born 1965), Japanese screenwriter (born Noboru Aikawa)
- Tetsuro Aikawa (相川 哲郎; born 1954), Japanese businessman
- Yoshisuke Aikawa (鮎川 義介; 1880–1967), Japanese businessman, founder and first of the president of Nissan zaibatsu (a.k.a. Gisuke Ayukawa)
- Yuzuki Aikawa (愛川 ゆず季; born 1983), Japanese gravure idol and professional wrestler

== Fictional characters ==
- Akane Aikawa (愛川 茜), from the anime/OVA series Magic User's Club
- Ayumu Aikawa (相川 歩), the main protagonist in the manga/anime series Is This a Zombie?
- Chocola Aikawa (哀川 ショコラ), the female chocolatier from the manga and anime series Chocolat no Mahō
- Eri Aikawa (相川 絵理), a character in the anime/manga Junjo Romantica
- Hajime Aikawa (相川 始), human guise of Kamen Rider Chalice from the Tokusatsu TV series Kamen Rider Blade
- Hinako Aikawa (藍川 雛子), from the manga series Bitter Virgin
- Hiroya Aikawa (相川 ひろや), from the anime/manga series Fancy Lala
- Jun'ichi Aikawa / Green Sai (相川 純一 / グリーンサイ), from the Super Sentai series Choujuu Sentai Liveman
- Kazuhiko Aizawa (哀川 和彦), from the manga/anime series Dear Boys
- Kizuna Aikawa (藍川 絆), from the manga series Prunus Girl
- Love Aikawa (愛川 羅武(ラブ)), a Vizard in Bleach
- Maki Aikawa (相川 摩季), from the manga/anime series Air Master
- Makoto Aikawa (愛川 誠), from the anime series Machine Robo Rescue
- Mari Aikawa (相川 麻理), from the Super Sentai series Choujuu Sentai Liveman
- Rumi & Madoka Aikawa, from the video game series Metal Slug series
- Shinichirō Aikawa (相川 真一郎), from the hentai video game Triangle Heart
