= Rena Ryūgū =

Higurashi When They Cry character

- Higurashi When They Cry character
- Rena as seen in Higurashi no Naku Koro ni Sui
- First appearance: Higurashi no Naku Koro ni Onikakushi-hen (2002)
- Created by: Ryukishi07
- Designed by: Ryukishi07
- Voiced by: English: Mela Lee (2006 anime); Emi Lo (2020 anime); Japanese: Mai Nakahara
- Portrayed by: Minami Kato (drama); Airi Matsuyama (film)

In-universe information
- Alias: Reina Ryūgū
- Nationality: Japanese

Rena Ryūgū (Japanese: 竜宮 レナ, Hepburn: Ryūgū Rena) is a fictional character in the Higurashi When They Cry series. Born as Reina Ryūgū (Japanese: 竜宮 礼奈, Hepburn: Ryūgū Reina), she adopts the name "Rena" upon moving back to her hometown of Hinamizawa from Ibaraki Prefecture following a mental breakdown that led to self-harm.

Whilst on the surface, she adopts a naive, cheerful, and innocent persona, Rena is perceptive, strong-willed, and reacts strongly to being lied to. In some arcs, her traumatic background and staunch belief in the curse of Oyashiro culminate in her committing violent crimes.

Rena is regarded as a mascot character for 07th Expansion. Her image, which merges kawaii culture with elements of horror and violence, has substantially inspired the moe genre, as well as menhera and yandere.

== Development and design ==
According to series creator Ryukishi07, Rena "embodies the world of the story like no other character, a girl trying to be normal in a world that won't allow it". Scarred by her parents' traumatic divorce, she suffers from acute maternal and self-abjection, a trait reflected in both her fascination with the town's illegal garbage dumping site, where she passes her time "treasure-hunting" for cute things. Rena wears a Lolita-style white dress. She will kill if she believes she has no choice and is capable of deflecting suspicion under an innocent façade. When Rena is lied to, or when the validity of the curse of Oyashiro is questioned, she becomes hostile and prone to violence. Ryukishi07 said he made Rena weird and close to a pervert on purpose. In a famous scene named the "door scene" by fans, from Keiichi's perspective, Rena tries to force her way into his house to feed him, ferociously screaming with a crazed look in her eyes, all while trying to force her way beyond the chained door.

At certain points in the story, specifically when discussing Oyashiro-sama or when calling out a lie, the light in Rena's eyes disappears and takes on an uncanny appearance, an effect which has become synonymous with the series. Yatazakura, character designer of 07th Expansion, created Rena's original sprites after studying other games and discovering that the sudden cloudy-eyed effect was a subtle yet powerful way to evoke fear. Ichijinsha noted that, in 2D art, attention is naturally drawn towards the eyes, resulting in an especially unsettling effect when coupled with the shock factor. In the anime, this shift is done through uncomfortably angled framing, as well as a gradual increase in the use of blackout shadows to obscure half of Rena's face.

Rena's signature weapon is a cleaver (more accurately, a Japanese gardening tool called a Nata). Originally an axe, the design was changed during development in favor of a more "stylish" weapon. Ryukishi07 described it as "a recurring theme to show on the cover a girl and kyoki (Note: A pun of "dangerous weapon" (凶器, kyoki) and "insanity" (狂気, kyoki).)". To "impress the reader with the unique personality of each character", Ryukishi07 developed Rena's use of the word kana? kana in dialogue, a special way of repeating the interrogative particle kana twice that is not encountered in the real world.

Rena is voiced by Mai Nakahara in Japanese and Mela Lee and Emi Lo in English. Nakahara describes Rena as a diverse character. Rena is portrayed by Airi Matsuyama in the live-action film series, and by Minami Kato in the TV drama. Matsuyama had worried about her performance, and portrayed her in a more realistic way. Asahi, the illustrator of Higurashi no Naku Koro ni Oni, described Rena as the cutest character overall and praised her charm and realism.

== Appearances ==
Rena originally appeared as the mascot of 07th Expansion on its homepage and card illustrations, and her name is a variant of Ryukishi07. She was officially introduced in Higurashi no Naku Koro ni Onikakushi-hen and has appeared in most installments across the series. Her real name is Reina Ryūgū. In Tsumihoroboshi-hen, the player sees the story from Rena's perspective for most of the arc. It is revealed that, due to her mother's affair and consequent pregnancy, she begins to detest her position with her mother and insists on being called "Rena". She blames herself for her parents' divorce, becoming mentally unstable and despondent, attacking three of her male classmates with a baseball bat and smashing all the windows in her school. She was then diagnosed with dysautonomia and hospitalized, during which she attempted to slit both her wrists. She believed that "Oyashiro-sama" was punishing her for leaving the village by destroying her family and making maggots live in her blood. However, the true reason for the latter actually is that she suffers from Hinamizawa Syndrome, a fictional disease based on schizophrenia and delusional parasitosis. After moving back to Hinamizawa, she develops a fixation on cute things and tries to take things she finds cute home. She also attributed the disappearance of Satoshi Hojo to Oyashiro-sama's curse. Her best friend is Keiichi Maebara, and she has a crush on him. Although she is aware that Mion Sonozaki has feelings for Keiichi, she does not change the way she treats him. She can weakly perceive alternate realities. Rena serves as both the protagonist and villain of Tsumihoroboshi-hen, the sixth installment of the original games.

The expanded arcs of Higurashi no Naku Koro ni Kizuna includes Rena being involved in a series of murder cases investigated by Tomoe Minai. Victims in the case include the boyfriend of Ozaki Nagisa, Rena's childhood friend, who was wounded in Rena's attacks in Ibaraki Prefecture, and Nagisa herself.

In Higurashi: When They Cry – Gou, the sequel to the series, Rena was present for the Three Families announcing that Oyashiro-sama's curse is no more, and entered university as she grown-up. One of the main characters in Higurashi no Naku Koro ni Rei which is set in 2019, Kihiro, is mentioned as Rena's son.

She made a guest appearance in a crossover manga with Ryukishi07's other work, Umineko When They Cry. Rena has also appeared in Trickster Online, Super Heroine Chronicle, Last Period, SINoALICE, Ao Oni Online, Elemental Story, and PUBG Mobile as part of a collaboration event. She also appeared in the official illustrations of Grisaia: Phantom Trigger the Animation Stargazer and A Couple of Cuckoos. SoulStudio announced in April 2026 that it would adapt Higurashi series as part of its Line-based chatbot service, SoulChat, which allows users to interact with Rena Ryūgū and other characters.

== Reception and legacy ==
The scene of "Uso Da!" jumpscare is received generally positive reception and identified as a fan favorite

Rena was selected in the best 4 in the 2007 Anime Saimoe Tournament. In a 2013 poll by BIGLOBE, Rena was ranked as the 5th most popular "yandere" character. In a 2015 poll held by Kaga Create, Rena was voted the most popular Higurashi When They Cry character with 2,973 votes. To celebrate this result, PlayStation Vita and PlayStation 3 released the Rena Ryūgū theme. According to a survey in August 2015, Rena was considered one of the most typical "menhera" anime and manga characters. In a Netorabo poll, Rena was the most popular Higurashi When They Cry character in 2020, polling 19.6%. In its 2021 poll, Rena was the second-most frightening Higurashi When They Cry character, polling 22.5%, and the second-most character on the classmate list. At the same year, Rena was voted the fan-favorite character amongst the Higurashi When They Cry cast with 5,515 votes in a MyAnimeList poll. Numerous figures of Rena have been created. Other merchandise, including acrylic stands and watches, have been modeled after Rena, including cushion replicas of her cleaver.

She has been well received by critics. APGNation's Nicole Seraphita praised the character development of Rena as "perhaps the best of the lot", pointing out she comes across as a rather generic girl-next-door type at first, but she evolves into something far more interesting as more of her background is revealed. Marcus Estrada from Hardcore Gamer praised Rena's role characterization in Tsumihoroboshi-hen that "Rena is a much stronger, deeper character than anyone may have expected". Hinamizawa Shūichi of Netorabo described Rena as synonymous with the psychological horror part of the series, and praised the horror and contrast of the scenes involving her. Jenni Lada for Siliconera also pointed out that the shift of Rena is especially evocative due to she was set up as the "cutest" character at the beginning of the story. Sarah Fimm from The Mary Sue said Rena is "especially scary", and called her the "demonic little sister". The Capsule Computers reviewer Luke Halliday praised Rena's Japanese voice actor Mai Nakahara for "doing a great job with the character", though he thought Rena's character molding is slightly stereotypical. Theron Martin of Anime News Network praised Rena's English voice actor Mela Lee for performing sufficiently close to the original. Rebecca Silverman from the same website criticized Rena's role in the When They Cry: Rei episode "Hirukowashi-hen" for she was used to make an "uncomfortable" lesbian joke, and the THEM Anime Reviews thought this episode shows that Rena is "perhaps the least feminist of the girls". Anime Feminist writer Lilith Miao stated that Rena was the first character with "multiple personalities" that she got invested in, but she criticized the inaccurate portrayal of Rena's split personality in the plot.

Rena's line, "Uso Da!" (嘘だ!; lit. 'That's a lie!'), first appears in Higurashi no Naku Koro ni Onikakushi-hen as a sudden charged response to what appears to be a minor lie from Keiichi. The scene is regarded as the moment the series tone shifts towards psychological horror. Episode 3 of Higurashi: When They Cry – Gou reproduced this scene. The phrase went on to be featured in official merchandise, such as a nendoroid figure of Rena with an interchangeable "Uso Da" face, a mug, a theme hoodie, and Line stickers.

While the Higurashi franchise was successful in the doujin circle, the series also gained widespread public attention due to mass media reports speculating on its potential influence on juvenile crime, which tend to associate murders by youth, especially girls, with Rena. In 2007, the 12th episode of When They Cry: Kai was temporarily removed from broadcasting because Rena's use of an axe weapon bore similarities to a real-life murder in Kyoto, where a female minor killed her father with an axe as he slept. During the Osaka city mayor election in 2014, the candidate Shigeo Ninomiya cited Rena's word on Twitter to express his enthusiasm for the election. In 2017, the Ogawa Junior High School in Nakagawa, Tochigi found 12 glass doors were broken and the word "Higurashi" written in red spray paint across the windows in the staff room, which was thought to be a reference to Rena. Silent Hill f director Al Yang revealed that the iconic cleaver of Rena Ryūgū was originally supposed to be one of Hinako's combat weapons as a reference to When They Cry series

== Footnotes ==
Notes
