= Aikawa =

Aikawa may refer to:

== People ==
- Aikawa (surname)

== Places ==
- Aikawa, Akita, a former town in Kitaakita District, Akita Japan; it was merged with other towns to form Kitaakita
- Aikawa, Kanagawa, a town in Aiko District, Kanagawa, Japan
- Aikawa, Niigata, a former town on Sado Island, Niigata Prefecture, Japan, famous for its former gold mines

== See also ==
- 合川 (disambiguation)
