= Material Puzzle =

Japanese manga series

- First tankōbon volume cover

マテリアル・パズル (Materiaru Pazuru)
- Genre: Fantasy
- Manga
- Written by: Masahiro Totsuka
- Published by: Square Enix (former); Kodansha (current; digital)
- Magazine: Monthly Shōnen Gangan
- Original run: January 12, 2002 – September 12, 2008
- Volumes: 22
- Series titles
- 1. Material Puzzle (2002–2008, (Note: Including a series of gaiden chapters serialized in 2007–08) 20 volumes); 2. Material Puzzle: Saikō Shōnen (2008, 2 volumes)
- Manga

Material Puzzle: Zero Kreuz
- Written by: Masahiro Totsuka
- Illustrated by: Kimitake Yoshioka
- Published by: Square Enix (former); Kodansha (current; digital)
- Magazine: Monthly Shōnen Gangan (2008–2009); Gangan Online (2009–2012)
- Original run: October 11, 2008 – March 22, 2012
- Volumes: 9
- Manga

Material Puzzle: Kaminaki Sekai no Mahoutsukai
- Written by: Masahiro Totsuka
- Published by: Kodansha
- Magazine: Morning Two
- Original run: May 22, 2018 – December 22, 2022
- Volumes: 10
- icon

Material Puzzle (Japanese: マテリアル・パズル, Hepburn: Materiaru Pazuru) is a Japanese manga series written and illustrated by Masahiro Totsuka. It was serialized in Square Enix's shōnen manga magazine Monthly Shōnen Gangan from 2002 to 2007, followed by gaiden chapters and a short series subtitled Saikō Shōnen, published from 2007 to 2008. A prequel series by Kimitake Yoshioka, titled Material Puzzle: Zero Kreuz, was serialized in Monthly Shōnen Gangan and Gangan Online from 2008 to 2009. Nine years after the original series' finale, Totsuka started another series, titled Material Puzzle: Kaminaki Sekai no Mahoutsukai, in Kodansha's seinen manga magazine Morning Two, which ran from 2018 to 2022.

== Plot ==
Set in a fictional world where magic is used, Mikaze is sent by the two elders of his village to ask the 3 great immortal magicians to help his village from being overtaken by a large fungi called the Yamakuidake (Mountain eating Mushroom). So he starts his quest and climbs up the mountain that the Three Magicians live on to ask, but upon meeting the 3 Magicians, he learns that the other two are gone and he is left with Aqua, a young girl who uses candy as a wand. Eventually, they agree: she will go and help his village as long as he brings her back safe and sound to the mountain afterwards. The only problem is that, as a sign of their agreement, he has to wear a mask until the agreement is fulfilled.

== Publication ==
Written and illustrated by Masahiro Totsuka, Material Puzzle started in Square Enix's shōnen manga magazine Monthly Shōnen Gangan on January 12, 2002. (Note: The series started in the February 2002 issue. The magazine is generally published on the 12th of the month preceding the one indicated by the issue.) The main series finished on June 12, 2007. A gaiden story started on August 11, 2007, and finished on March 12, 2008. A four-chapter story, titled Material Puzzle: Saikō Shōnen (マテリアル・パズル〜彩光少年〜), was published in the same magazine from June 12 to September 12, 2008. Square Enix collected the Material Puzzle chapters in 20 tankōbon volumes, released from June 22, 2002, to September 22, 2007, and the Material Puzzle: Saikō Shōnen chapters were collected in two tankōbon volumes, released from September 22, 2008, to February 21, 2009. In 2018, Kodansha started re-releasing the manga volumes in a new edition as ebooks, which were numbered 1–22.

A prequel manga by Kimitake Yoshioka, titled Material Puzzle: Zero Kreuz (マテリアル・パズル ゼロクロイツ), started in Monthly Shōnen Gangan on October 11, 2008. The series was later moved to Gangan Online in 2009 and finished on March 22, 2012. Square Enix collected its chapters in nine tankōbon volumes, released from September 22, 2008, to May 22, 2012. In 2018, Kodansha republished the series in 10 ebooks.

Nine years after the original series finale, Totsuka published a gaiden chapter in Kodansha's seinen manga magazine Morning Two on January 22, 2018, and another series, titled Material Puzzle: Kaminaki Sekai no Mahoutsukai (マテリアル・パズル 〜神無き世界の魔法使い〜), started in the same magazine on May 22 of that same year. The magazine ceased print publication and move to a digital release starting on August 4, 2022. The series finished on December 22 of that same year. Kodansha collected its chapters in ten tankōbon volumes, released from February 22, 2019, to February 21, 2023.
