= Mela Lee =

American voice actress

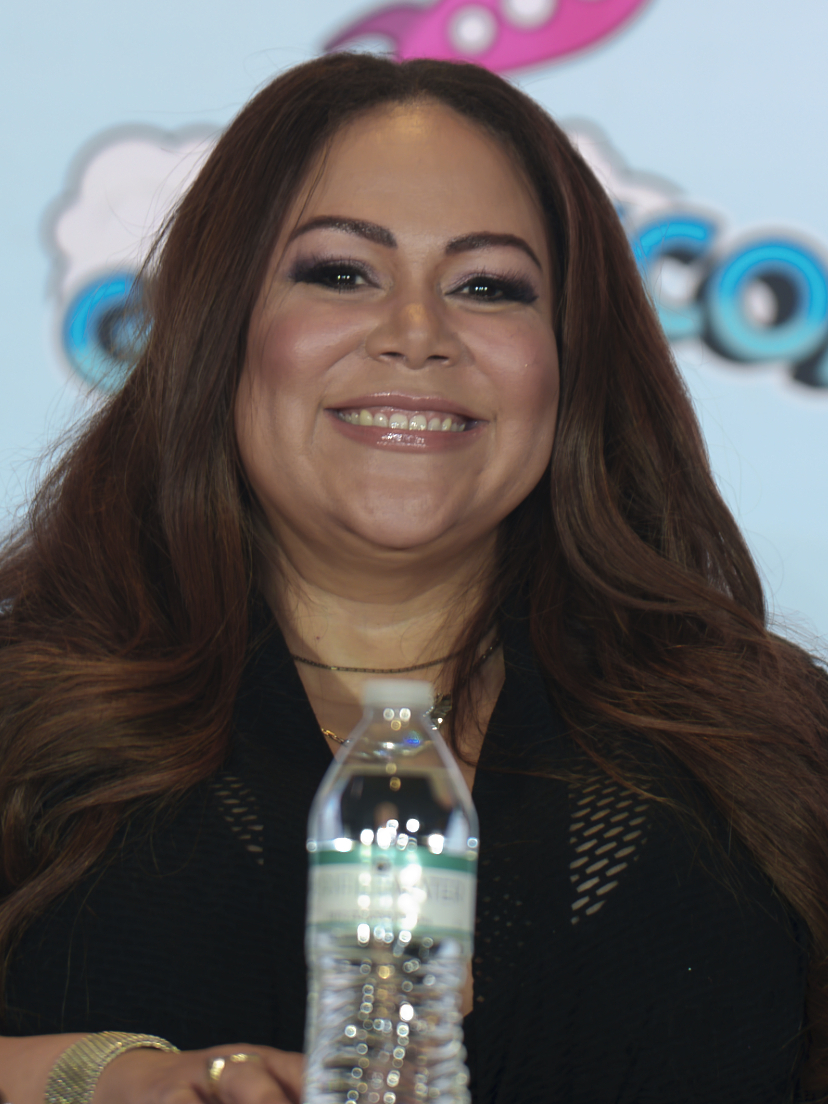
- Lee at GalaxyCon Richmond in 2024
- Education: Pepperdine University
- Occupation: Voice actress
- Website: melalee.com

Mela Lee is an American voice actress based in Los Angeles who voices characters on a number of animated series, films, television shows and video games. She is best known as the voice of Jade in Mortal Kombat 11. In anime, she voices lead characters Rin Tohsaka in Fate/stay night as well as Fate/stay night: Unlimited Blade Works and the film trilogy Fate/stay night: Heaven's Feel; Yuki Cross in Vampire Knight; Shinku the fifth Rozen Maiden doll in Rozen Maiden; and Erika Karisawa in the Durarara!! series, which was broadcast on Adult Swim. In animation, she is the voice of Tikki in Miraculous: Tales of Ladybug & Cat Noir, which airs on Disney Channel, Disney+ and Netflix, and Kikimora in The Owl House. In video games, she voices Lifeline in Apex Legends, Rena Ryūgū in Higurashi When They Cry, Rachel Alucard in the BlazBlue series, Tiki in the Fire Emblem series and Super Smash Bros. Ultimate, and Sharon Kreuger and Scarlet in The Legend of Heroes: Trails of Cold Steel series.

== Career ==
Lee first got into voice acting when she auditioned for Vampire Princess Miyu, but the director had her read for Saint Tail, and she was cast as the title character Meimi Haneoka, whom assumes the secret identity of Saint Tail. She would later land the vampire role of Yuki Cross in the Vampire Knight series and Rin Tohsaka, the heroine of the Fate/stay night series. She also played the lead heroine in Rozen Maiden. Lee has also served as an ADR voice replacement specialist in over 100 projects, including Suicide Squad, Gotham, Detroit, Zero Dark Thirty, Atlanta, and The Good Wife.

In addition to voice acting, Lee is the lead singer, composer, and lyricist for her band Magnolia Memoir. She and fellow voice actress Erica Lindbeck host their own web series called Lindbeck and Lee with voice actor guests.

== Filmography ==
=== Anime ===
List of English dubbing performances in anime
Year	Title	Role	Notes	Source
2001	Saint Tail	Meimi / St. Tail		
2006	Immortal Grand Prix	Max Erlich		
2006	Kannazuki no Miko	Kyoko		
2006	Fate/stay night	Rin Tohsaka		
2007–11	Rozen Maiden series	Shinku	Also Trumend, Ouverture	
2007	Higurashi: When They Cry	Rena Ryūgū		Press
2008	Gurren Lagann	Darry		
2008–09	Tweeny Witches	Eva		Resume
2009	Blade of the Immortal	Rin Asano		Press
2010–11	Vampire Knight series	Yuki Cross	Also Guilty	Press
2011	Durarara!!	Erika Karisawa		
2012	Nura: Rise of the Yokai Clan series	Kana Ienaga	as Kayla Yesratsian	
2013	Fate/Zero	Rin Tohsaka		
2015–16	Durarara!!×2	Erika Karisawa		
2015	BlazBlue Alter Memory	Rachel Alucard		
2015	Aldnoah.Zero	Orlane		
2015–16	Fate/stay night: Unlimited Blade Works	Rin Tohsaka	TV series	
2018–20	The Seven Deadly Sins	Melascula		
2016; 2019	Hunter × Hunter	Canary, others	2011 series	
2016	The Asterisk War	Sylvia Ryuneheim		Press
2016	Erased	Misato Yanagihara		
2017	Mob Psycho 100	Rei Kurosaki		Tweet
2017	Berserk	Schierke	2016 series	
2018	Sword Gai: The Animation	Mina Haraya		
2018	Fate/Extra: Last Encore	Rin Tohsaka		
2019	Cannon Busters	Dex		Tweet
2019	Demon Slayer: Kimetsu no Yaiba	Kanata Ubuyashiki		Facebook
2019–20	Fate/Grand Order - Absolute Demonic Front: Babylonia	Ishtar, Ereshkigal		
2021	Yashahime: Princess Half-Demon	Tamano		
2023	My Happy Marriage	Hana Kanao		

=== Animation ===
List of voice performances in animation
Year	Title	Role	Notes	Source
2015–present	Miraculous: Tales of Ladybug & Cat Noir	Tikki, Aurore Beauréal/Stormy Weather, Penny Rolling/Troublemaker, Mireille Caquet		
2018–19	Avengers Assemble	Princess Zanda		Website
2018–19	RWBY	Caroline Cordovin		
2020–present	The Loud House	Principal Rivers		
2020–23	The Owl House	Kikimora		
2021–24	The Ghost and Molly McGee	Atomic Pink lead singer, Linda		
2022	Samurai Rabbit: The Usagi Chronicles	Lady Fuwa, Kaiyo, Toshiko, Fumiko, Hana, Kana, Warbotto, and Sawaguchi		
2022	Barbie: It Takes Two	Simone Roberts		

=== Films ===
List of voice and English dubbing performances in feature films
Year	Title	Role	Notes	Source
2010	Alpha and Omega	Candy		
2018	Fate/stay night: Heaven's Feel I. presage flower	Rin Tohsaka	English dub; Limited theatrical release	
2023	Suzume	Miki	English dub	
2023	Ladybug & Cat Noir: The Movie	Tikki	English dub	

List of voice and English dubbing performances in direct-to-video and television films
Year	Title	Role	Notes	Source
2008	Strait Jacket	Minea	English dub	
2012	Fate/stay night: Unlimited Blade Works	Rin Tohsaka		
2014	Alpha and Omega 3: The Great Wolf Games	Agnes		
2015	Alpha and Omega: Family Vacation	Agnes		
2015	Madea's Tough Love	Old Lady		
2016	Alpha and Omega: The Big Fureeze	Agnes		
2017	Alpha and Omega: Journey to Bear Kingdom	Agnes		
2019	Fate/stay night: Heaven's Feel II. lost butterfly	Rin Tohsaka	English dub	
2021	Fate/stay night: Heaven's Feel III. spring song	Rin Tohsaka	English dub	
2021	Case Closed: The Fist of Blue Sapphire	Rechel Cheong		

=== Video games ===
List of voice and English dubbing performances in video games
Year	Title	Role	Notes	Source
2008	Castle of Shikigami III	Nagino Ise, Emilio Stanburke, Freedom Wind		
2009–present	BlazBlue series	Rachel Alucard	English dub	Press
2013	Fire Emblem Awakening	Tiki	English dub	Press
2014	Digimon All-Star Rumble	Biyomon, Hououmon	English dub	
2015	Xenoblade Chronicles X	Celica	English dub	
2015	The Legend of Heroes: Trails of Cold Steel	Sharon Kreuger, Scarlet	English dub	
2016	The Legend of Heroes: Trails of Cold Steel II	Sharon Kreuger, Scarlet	English dub	
2017	Fire Emblem Heroes	Tiki	English dub	
2018	BlazBlue: Cross Tag Battle	Rachel Alucard	English dub	Tweet
2018	Super Smash Bros. Ultimate	Tiki	English dub	
2019	Apex Legends	Lifeline		
2019	Mortal Kombat 11	Jade		Tweet
2019	Pokémon Masters	Karen	English dub	Tweet
2019	Daemon X Machina	Sif, Ayer		
2019	Phantasy Star Online 2	Sukunahime	English dub	
2020	Granblue Fantasy Versus	Zeta	English dub	
2020	Deadly Premonition 2: A Blessing in Disguise	Aaliyah Davis		
2020	Guardian Tales	Miya		
2020	The Legend of Heroes: Trails of Cold Steel IV	Sharon Kreuger		
2021	Demon Slayer: Kimetsu no Yaiba – The Hinokami Chronicles	White-Haired Guide		
2022	Rune Factory 5	Hina		
2023	Fire Emblem Engage	Tiki		
2023	The Legend of Heroes: Trails into Reverie	Sharon Kreuger, Wendy		
2023	Mortal Kombat: Onslaught	Jade		Tweet
2023	Granblue Fantasy Versus: Rising	Zeta		
2024	Granblue Fantasy: Relink	Zeta		
2025	Rune Factory: Guardians of Azuma	Hina		
2025	Date Everything!	Betty		

== Awards and nominations ==
In 2015, Lee was nominated for the BTVA Anime Dub Award for Best Female Lead Vocal Performance in an Anime Television Series/OVA for her role as Rin Tohsaka in Fate/stay night: Unlimited Blade Works.
