= 合川 =

合川 is an Asian place name meaning "combined, river".

It may refer to locations:

- Aikawa, Akita, Japan
- Aikawa Station (Akita), railway station located in the city of Kitaakita, Akita Prefecture, Japan
- Hechuan District, district in the Chongqing, China

== See also ==
- Aikawa (disambiguation)
- Hechuan (disambiguation)
