= Crimson Prince =

Japanese manga series

- First tankōbon volume cover

紅心王子 (Kurenai Ōji)
- Genre: Fantasy
- Manga
- Written by: Souta Kuwahara
- Published by: Square Enix
- English publisher: NA: Yen Press (digital)
- Magazine: Monthly Shōnen Gangan
- Original run: April 12, 2007 – September 12, 2020
- Volumes: 18

Crimson Prince (Japanese: 紅心王子, Hepburn: Kurenai Ōji) is a Japanese manga series written and illustrated by Souta Kuwahara. It was serialized in Square Enix's Monthly Shōnen Gangan from April 2007 to September 2020 and published in 18 volumes.

== Publication ==
The series is written and illustrated by Souta Kuwahara. It started serialization in Monthly Shōnen Gangan on April 12, 2007. In March 2015, it was announced the series would be going on hiatus due to the author's health. Five years later, the series finished on September 12, 2020, with the release of the last two chapters in the final volumes.

In July 2015, Yen Press announced they licensed the series for English publication digitally.

=== Volume list ===
No.	Original release date	Original ISBN	English release date	English ISBN
1	November 22, 2007	978-4-75-752161-2	November 24, 2015	978-0-31-635499-8
2	March 22, 2008	978-4-75-752240-4	January 26, 2016	978-0-31-639599-1
3	July 22, 2008	978-4-75-752326-5	March 29, 2016	978-0-31-627518-7
4	December 22, 2008	978-4-75-752441-5	May 31, 2016	978-0-31-627520-0
5	June 22, 2009	978-4-75-752580-1	July 26, 2016	978-0-31-650265-8
6	December 22, 2009	978-4-75-752718-8	September 27, 2016	978-0-31-650597-0
7	June 22, 2010	978-4-75-752900-7	November 29, 2016	978-0-31-643858-2
8	December 22, 2010	978-4-75-753085-0	January 31, 2017	978-0-31-655985-0
9	April 22, 2011	978-4-75-753192-5	March 28, 2017	978-0-31-655986-7
10	August 22, 2011	978-4-75-753360-8	May 30, 2017	978-0-31-655988-1
11	January 21, 2012	978-4-75-753472-8	July 25, 2017	978-0-31-655989-8
12	July 21, 2012	978-4-75-753661-6	September 26, 2017	978-0-31-655990-4
13	February 22, 2013	978-4-75-753874-0	November 28, 2017	978-0-31-655992-8
14	August 22, 2013	978-4-75-754033-0	January 30, 2018	978-0-31-655995-9
15	February 22, 2014	978-4-75-754218-1	March 27, 2018	978-0-31-655997-3
16	August 22, 2014	978-4-75-754387-4	May 29, 2018	978-0-31-655998-0
17	September 12, 2020	978-4-75-756844-0	April 27, 2021	978-1-97-533429-1
18	September 12, 2020	978-4-75-756845-7	May 25, 2021	978-1-97-533430-7

== Reception ==
Pilau Daures from Du9 praised the series for its unique style and artwork. Koiwai from Manga News was more critical, stating that the series was "nice but lackluster [overall]". Unlike Koiwai, Faustine Lillaz from Planete BD was more positive, calling the series "simple but charming".
