= Bloody Cross =

Japanese manga series

- First tankōbon volume cover

ブラッディ・クロス (Buraddi Kurosu)
- Genre: Action; Fantasy; Romantic thriller
- Manga
- Written by: Shiwo Komeyama
- Published by: Square Enix
- English publisher: NA: Yen Press
- Magazine: Monthly Shōnen Gangan
- Original run: February 12, 2009 – July 10, 2015
- Volumes: 12

Bloody Cross (Japanese: ブラッディ・クロス, Hepburn: Buraddi Kurosu) is a Japanese manga series written and illustrated by Shiwo Komeyama. It originated as a one-shot published in 2007. It later became a full series, which was serialized in Square Enix's Monthly Shōnen Gangan from February 2009 to July 2015. The chapters of the series were collected into twelve volumes.

== Publication ==
The series is written and illustrated by Shiwo Komeyama. It started as a one-shot published by Komeyama, under the pen name Aoi Mizuki, in Square Enix's Monthly Shōnen Gangan magazine on June 12, 2007. The manga was serialized in the same magazine from February 12, 2009, to July 10, 2015. The series was collected into twelve tankōbon volumes.

In April 2013, Yen Press announced they licensed the series for English publication.

=== Volume list ===
No.	Original release date	Original ISBN	English release date	English ISBN
1	June 22, 2009	978-4-75-752584-9	December 17, 2013	978-0-31-632238-6
2	November 21, 2009	978-4-75-752721-8	March 25, 2014	978-0-31-637115-5
3	April 22, 2010	978-4-75-752844-4	June 24, 2014	978-0-31-637116-2
4	October 22, 2010	978-4-75-753023-2	September 23, 2014	978-0-31-637117-9
5	April 22, 2011	978-4-75-753195-6	December 16, 2014	978-0-31-637118-6
6	October 22, 2011	978-4-75-753387-5	March 24, 2015	978-0-31-637119-3
7	April 21, 2012	978-4-75-753550-3	June 23, 2015	978-0-31-637120-9
8	November 22, 2012	978-4-75-753779-8	September 22, 2015	978-0-31-637121-6
9	July 22, 2013	978-4-75-754000-2	December 15, 2015	978-0-31-635216-1
10	March 22, 2014	978-4-75-754241-9	March 22, 2016	978-0-31-639357-7
11	November 22, 2014	978-4-75-754411-6	June 28, 2016	978-0-31-639360-7
12	September 19, 2015	978-4-75-754735-3	October 25, 2016	978-0-31-654537-2

== Reception ==
Rebecca Silverman from Anime News Network praised the first volume for its action and plot, while criticizing the art for being "too bright" and stating that it "lacks backgrounds". Reviewing for Otaku USA, Jason Thompson also praised the action and compared it to that of D.Gray-man, while criticizing the story and character, calling the story "repetitive" and stating the characters "[only have] four moods: snark, angst, fighting, and making out". Like Silverman and Thompson, Sean Gaffney from A Case Suitable for Treatment also praised the action, while also criticizing the plot, stating that he "couldn't get a handle on the story". Contrary to other reviewers, Mathew Warner from The Fandom Post praised the plot, stating it "can be a lot of fun" and calling the series over a "fairly enjoyable read". Erkael from Manga News also offered praise for the action, while also criticizing the art for being generic.
