= Shibuya Goldfish =

Japanese manga series by Hiroumi Aoi

- Cover of the first volume

渋谷金魚
- Genre: Horror
- Manga
- Written by: Hiroumi Aoi
- Published by: Square Enix
- English publisher: NA: Yen Press
- Magazine: Gangan Joker
- Original run: September 21, 2016 – April 22, 2021
- Volumes: 11

Shibuya Goldfish (Japanese: 渋谷金魚, Hepburn: Shibuya Kingyo) is a Japanese manga series written and illustrated by Hiroumi Aoi. It was serialized in Square Enix's Gangan Joker from September 2016 to April 2021 and published in 11 volumes.

== Premise ==
The series centers on Hajime Tsukiyoda, a high school film student who finds himself in the middle of a terrifying event where giant goldfish suddenly descend on the populace of Shibuya and begin feeding on people. Hajime meets with popular classmate Fukakusa whom he immediately crushes on and tries to save. However, she is revealed to be deranged and unsympathetic to his plight and, in an effort to have him "sacrifice" himself, ends up getting killed by the goldfish. Hajime tries to kill himself by jumping from a building, but ends up killing several goldfish on the way down and survives. He is soon rescued by several survivors who inform him that a giant glass bowl has been placed over Shibuya and now they must try to escape.

== Publication ==
The series is written and illustrated by Hiroumi Aoi, and began serialization in Gangan Joker on September 21, 2016. In November 2019, it was revealed the series would enter its final arc after a one-month break. The series ended in Gangan Joker on April 22, 2021. The series individual chapters were collected into eleven tankōbon volumes.

At Anime NYC 2017, Yen Press announced they licensed the series for English publication.

=== Volume list ===
No.	Original release date	Original ISBN	English release date	English ISBN
1	February 22, 2017	978-4-75-755253-1	June 26, 2018	978-1-97-532744-6
2	June 22, 2017	978-4-75-755387-3	October 30, 2018	978-1-97-535407-7
3	December 22, 2017	978-4-75-755557-0	February 19, 2019	978-1-97-538214-8
4	May 22, 2018	978-4-75-755724-6	May 28, 2019	978-1-97-538419-7
5	October 22, 2018	978-4-75-755884-7	August 27, 2019	978-1-97-538505-7
6	March 22, 2019	978-4-75-756067-3	December 24, 2019	978-1-97-538758-7
7	August 22, 2019	978-4-75-756249-3	March 17, 2020	978-1-97-539954-2
8	February 22, 2020	978-4-75-756528-9	November 17, 2020	978-1-97-531734-8
9	August 21, 2020	978-4-75-756803-7	June 1, 2021	978-1-97-532462-9
10	January 22, 2021	978-4-75-757040-5	March 22, 2022	978-1-97-533570-0
11	June 22, 2021	978-4-75-757328-4	August 23, 2022	978-1-97-534541-9

== Reception ==
Katherine Dacey from The Manga Critic criticized the first volume for its characters and artwork. Manga artist Hiroya Oku recommended the series. At San Diego Comic-Con, Deb Aoki picked the series as the worst manga for anyone of any age.
