= Tohyo Game: One Black Ballot to You =

Japanese manga series

- First tankōbon volume cover

投票げぇむ あなたに黒き一票を (Tōhyō Gēmu: Anata ni Kuroki Ippyō o)
- Genre: Horror
- Manga
- Written by: Chihiro; G.O.
- Illustrated by: Tatsuhiko
- Published by: Square Enix
- English publisher: NA: Yen Press
- Imprint: Gangan Comics
- Magazine: Monthly Big Gangan
- Original run: April 25, 2014 – August 25, 2015
- Volumes: 3
- icon

Tohyo Game: One Black Ballot to You (Japanese: 投票げぇむ あなたに黒き一票を, Hepburn: Tōhyō Gēmu: Anata ni Kuroki Ippyō o) is a Japanese manga series written by Chihiro and G.O. and illustrated by Tatsuhiko. It was serialized in Square Enix's seinen manga magazine Monthly Big Gangan from April 2014 to August 2015, with its chapters collected in three tankōbon volumes. It was licensed for English release in North America by Yen Press.

== Publication ==
Written by Chihiro and G.O. and illustrated by Tatsuhiko, Tohyo Game: One Black Ballot to You was serialized in Square Enix's seinen manga magazine Monthly Big Gangan from April 25, 2014, to August 25, 2015. Square Enix collected its chapters in three tankōbon volumes, released from November 25, 2014, to October 24, 2015.

In North America, the manga was licensed for English release by Yen Press. The three volumes were released from October 25, 2016, to April 18, 2017.

== Reception ==
Rebecca Silverman from Anime News Network wrote that the plot of the manga looks borrowed from successful series like Another, Arisa and Secret; which unfortunately makes it less scary. Although, she noted that the characters are highly individual, and praised Tatsuhiko for his interesting approach in character design. She found death images very impressive but said that the characters' death itself didn't look any special to her. In a review of the first English volume, Cain Walter from Fandom Post wrote that the death scenes are well executed in the manga, which makes it above than the average manga of the same genre. He appreciated that the author didn't waste time introducing characters. He further mentioned that the English translation by Yen Press looks smooth and modern to him.
