= The Beautiful Deity =

Japanese manga series

- First tankōbon volume cover

美しいばけもの (Utsukushii Bakemono)
- Genre: Adventure; Fantasy
- Manga
- Written by: Yomoko Yamamoto
- Published by: Square Enix
- Magazine: Monthly GFantasy
- Original run: November 18, 2022 – February 18, 2025
- Volumes: 3

The Beautiful Deity (Japanese: 美しいばけもの, Hepburn: Utsukushii Bakemono) is a Japanese manga series written and illustrated by Yomoko Yamamoto. It was serialized in Square Enix's shōnen manga magazine Monthly GFantasy from November 2022 to February 2025, with its chapters collected in three tankōbon volumes.

== Plot ==
In a remote mountain village, harsh weather and endless winter lead the villagers to revive an ancient tradition of offering sacrifices to the Great Wolf God in order to prevent disaster. A young orphan boy, mistreated and abandoned by the villagers, is chosen as a human sacrifice, but instead of being killed, he begins a mysterious journey with the wolf deity that slowly turns their loneliness into a deep bond.

== Publication ==
Written and illustrated by Yomoko Yamamoto, The Beautiful Deity was serialized in Square Enix's shōnen manga magazine Monthly GFantasy from November 18, 2022, (Note: It started in the magazine's December issue of 2022 (cover date), which was released on November 18.) to February 18, 2025. (Note: It ended in the magazine's March issue of 2025 (cover date), which was released on February 18.) Square Enix collected its chapters into three tankōbon volumes, released from June 27, 2023. to April 25, 2025.

=== Volumes ===
No.	Japanese release date	Japanese ISBN
1	June 27, 2023	978-4-7575-8631-4
2	July 26, 2024	978-4-7575-9321-3
3	April 25, 2025	978-4-7575-9827-0
