= Hechuan (disambiguation) =

Hechuan may refer to these places in China:

- Hechuan District (合川区), Chongqing
- Hechuan Township (河川乡), in Guyuan, Ningxia

== Towns ==
- Hechuan, Jiangxi (禾川), in Yongxin County, Jiangxi
- Hechuan, Shanxi (和川), in Anze County, Shanxi

== See also ==
- 合川 (disambiguation)
