= Hiroki Aikawa =

Japanese popular music artist and composer

Aikawa Hiroki (愛川 ヒロキ) is a male Japanese popular music artist and composer. He was born in Iwaki City, Fukushima Prefecture on June 24, 1963. He made his debut with the band remote on 1988. After "remote" broke up, he wrote songs for other artists as well as playing for various artists. Currently, he is also working as a member of the band The Bean'S he created himself.

== Works ==
=== By Artists ===
- Don't Worry! 4L
- a abel
- Feinto Gachine Chiba Mika
- CANDY DOLL Emina Mako
- Muga HOLY NOIZ
- MiYOU Ikeda Kizoku
- I WISH Kirino Kanna
- innocence Kuno Sayaka
- NO Kamiyama Minori
- MIDNIGHT BLUE Mita Airi
- SECRET HEART MODE
- Kizu, Shinjitsu Natsuko
- EL AMOR Noah
- Yojo Robotomi
- Kurutta Tokei Shudo Kaori
- HOTMILK Takeda Aika
