= Violinist of Hameln =

Japanese manga series

- First tankōbon volume cover

ハーメルンのバイオリン弾き (Hamerun no Baiorin Hiki)
- Genre: Adventure; Fantasy comedy; Dark fantasy (Note: TV series only)
- Manga
- Written by: Michiaki Watanabe
- Published by: Enix
- Imprint: Gangan Comics
- Magazine: Monthly Shōnen Gangan
- Original run: March 1991 – January 2001
- Volumes: 37
- Video game
- Developer: Daft
- Publisher: Enix
- Genre: Side-scrolling platform game
- Platform: Super Famicom
- Released: September 29, 1995
- Anime film
- Directed by: Takashi Imanishi
- Produced by: Kenji Kume; Masahiko Kobayashi; Tsuyoshi Yoshida
- Written by: Takashi Imanishi
- Music by: Kohei Tanaka
- Studio: Nippon Animation
- Released: April 20, 1996
- Runtime: 30 minutes
- Anime television series
- Directed by: Junji Nishimura
- Produced by: Takashi Watanabe
- Written by: Yasuhiro Imagawa
- Music by: Kohei Tanaka
- Studio: Studio Deen
- Original network: TV Tokyo
- Original run: October 2, 1996 – March 26, 1997
- Episodes: 25
- Manga

Violinist of Hameln: Shchelkunchik
- Written by: Michiaki Watanabe
- Published by: Square Enix
- Magazine: Young Gangan
- Original run: January 18, 2008 – October 21, 2011
- Volumes: 8
- Manga

Zoku Violinist of Hameln
- Written by: Michiaki Watanabe
- Published by: Ringo Promotion (collected volumes)
- Imprint: Cocokara Comics
- Original run: February 17, 2012 – present
- Volumes: 22
- icon

Violinist of Hameln (Japanese: ハーメルンのバイオリン弾き, Hepburn: Hamerun no Baiorin Hiki) is a Japanese manga series written and illustrated by Michiaki Watanabe. It was serialized by Enix (later Square Enix) in its shōnen manga magazine Monthly Shōnen Gangan from March 1991 to January 2001, with its chapters collected in 37 tankōbon volumes. The story follows adventurers Hamel, Flute, Raiel, Trombone, and Sizer as they journey to the demon continent to prevent a catastrophe. Hamel wields a magical violin, using its music to compel monstrous foes to repent—by taking their own lives.

An anime film adaptation produced by Nippon Animation was released in April 1996. A 25-episode anime television series adaptation, produced by Studio Deen, was broadcast on TV Tokyo from October 1996 to March 1997; the TV series adopts a darker, more dramatic tone than the original work and film adaptation. A manga sequel, titled Violinist of Hameln: Shchelkunchik, was serialized in Square Enix's seinen manga magazine Young Gangan from January 2008 to October 2011. In February 2012, Watanabe started a self-published series titled Zoku Violinist of Hameln.

== Synopsis ==
=== Background ===
The world is divided between two dominant races: humans and Mazoku, a demonic species that once ruled unchallenged until their imprisonment five centuries ago at the hands of a heroic angel. Freed from Mazoku oppression, humanity entered an era of prosperity, establishing cities and nations while advancing both science and magic. This peace was shattered when a woman named Pandora inadvertently released the Mazoku from their confinement, plunging the world back into darkness. In response, the Demon King Chestra, who had also escaped from Pandora's Box, was forcibly resealed within it to prevent further devastation.

Pandora's twin children, fathered by Chestra, were separated shortly after birth. One was taken by the Mazoku, while the other remained with Pandora. To safeguard the world, the box containing the Demon King—now known as Pandora's Box—along with its key, was sent far beyond reach. The Mazoku retreated north, founding their capital, Hameln, on the northernmost continent, and an endless war erupted between the two races for survival.

Raised among humans yet despised for their heritage, one of Pandora's children grows under the weight of hatred, while the other, living among the Mazoku, knows no kindness. Their fates remain intertwined, destined to reunite and determine the outcome of the conflict, whether through destruction or reconciliation.

=== Plot ===
Hamel travels north toward the demon-continent, wielding a magical violin said to compel evildoers to repent and take their own lives. In reality, he is a deceitful, greedy coward who extorts those he supposedly saves. After liberating the village of Staccato from demons, he demands an orphan girl, Flute, as payment, forcibly taking her with him. Accompanied by his talking crow, Oboe, they begin their treacherous journey, marked by Hamel's constant scheming and mockery.

Their path soon crosses with Raiel, the noble Hero of Love and Hamel's childhood friend, who wields a massive golden piano capable of summoning spirits and bending wills. Their reunion erupts into a violent but inconclusive clash. Later, they encounter Trombone, the young prince of Dal Segno, a warrior kingdom annihilated by demonic forces. Witnessing his parents' murder, Trombone swears vengeance and joins the group.

As they press onward, their struggles escalate into battles against formidable foes, culminating in a confrontation with Sizer, the Hell Hawk King and one of the demonic Lords of Hell. Hamel's violin is shattered in the fight, revealing his true lineage—he is the son of the Demon King Chestra, and his quest is not for glory but to confront his father and rescue his mother, Pandora.

Their journey leads them to Sforzando, a powerful kingdom renowned for its magical knights and healing arts, ruled by Queen Horn, the world's strongest woman. There, Flute discovers she is the lost princess of Sforzando, abandoned as an infant to protect her during wartime. Though briefly reunited with her mother, Flute struggles with resentment and confusion. Meanwhile, Hamel departs to repair his violin, only for Sforzando to come under siege by the demonic forces of Drum, the Dragon King, and Guitar, the King of Beasts—both Lords of Hell. A brutal battle ensues, ending in Drum's defeat after transforming into a monstrous hydra.

With Sforzando saved, the group prepares to resume their journey. Queen Horn reveals her life is dwindling due to the toll of her barrier magic. Flute, torn between staying with her mother or following Hamel, ultimately chooses the latter, her feelings for him growing despite his cruelty. The party then scatters—Raiel returns to Staccato, Trombone visits his fallen kingdom, and Hamel, Flute, and Oboe continue northward, joined by Cornet, the younger sister of Clarinet.

In later events, a new tale follows a boy named Schel, an aspiring wizard who crosses paths with Great, Hamel's son, though their story unfolds separately.

== Characters ==
=== Main party ===
Hamel (ハーメル, Hāmeru)
Voiced by: Kazuki Yao (film), Yūji Ueda (TV series)
A self-proclaimed hero and the son of the Demon King Chestra and the holy maiden Pandora. Though greedy and prone to exploiting his companions—such as forcing Flute to wear costumes for profit or pushing them to physical and mental limits—he possesses a fundamentally kind nature. He wields a massive violin capable of playing demonic melodies that enhance and manipulate allies in battle against the Demon Army. His journey to the northern capital is driven by the goal of defeating the Demon King and rescuing his mother. Normally concealing it under a hat, he bears a single horn that, when emotionally provoked, triggers his demonic bloodlust, causing uncontrollable rampages.
Oboe (オーボウ, Ōbou)
Voiced by: Masaharu Satō (film), Shigeru Chiba (TV series)
A talking black crow who accompanies Hamel. Though non-combative, he serves as a paternal figure and mediator for the group, despite frequently being thrown at enemies or otherwise mistreated by Hamel.
Flute (フルート, Furūto)
Voiced by: Chisa Yokoyama (film), Mayumi Iizuka (TV series)
A righteous and cheerful village girl from Staccato Village. After being saved from a Demon Army attack by Hamel, she joins his travels—though she often endures mistreatment, such as being forced into costumes or enhanced against her will in battle through his melodies.
Raiel (ライエル, Raieru)
Voiced by: Toshihiko Seki (film), Kōji Tsujitani (TV series)
A self-styled "hero of love" and Hamel's childhood friend. Consumed by vengeance after Hamel killed his parents, he initially opposes Hamel's journey before reconciling and joining him. Kind-hearted but hopelessly flustered around women, he fights using a 500 kg golden piano, summoning firebirds and manipulating allies with his melodies.
Trombone (トロン・ボーン, Toron Bōn)
Voiced by: Tomoko Kojima (TV series)
The young prince of Dal Segno Kingdom, an ally of Sforzando Duchy. After losing his homeland and parents to the Demon Army, he seeks revenge and crosses paths with Hamel. Though brash and immature, he wields his father's sword technique, "Lion's Fury Slash" (Caesar Slash).
Sizer (サイザー, Saizā) / Hawk King Sizer (妖鳳王サイザー, Yōhō Ō Saizā)
Voiced by: Rei Sakuma (film), Megumi Ogata (TV series)
A winged executioner feared as the "Red Witch of Hamln". She wields a scythe-flute hybrid to summon Valkyries. She is later revealed to be Hamel's younger twin sister.
Ocarina (オカリナ, Okarina)
Voiced by: Mifuyu Hiiragi (TV series)
Sizer's deputy and maternal figure, who often takes the form of a crow.

=== Sforzando ===
Queen Horn (ホルン, Horun)
Voiced by: Sumi Shimamoto (TV series)
The queen of Sforzando Duchy. Beloved for her benevolence, she possesses healing magic at the cost of her lifespan, further shortened by past wars where she lost her son, Lute.
Clary Ned (クラーリィ・ネッド, Kurārī Neddo)
Voiced by: Mitsuaki Madono (TV series)
Leader of Sforzando's Magic Corps. Rescued by Horn and Lute in his youth, he repays his debt by serving the kingdom but holds disdain for Hamel's group. Obsessively protective of his sister, Cornet.
Cornet (コル・ネッド, Koru Neddo)
Voiced by: Chinami Nishimura (TV series)
A "Magic Brawler" and Clarinet's sister. While posing as Flute's magic instructor, she secretly schemes to eliminate Flute and win Hamel's affection. Deceptively sweet in appearance but cunning.
Percuss (パーカス, Pākasu)
Horn's butler, a skilled strategist and mage. He mistrusts Hamel's group and seeks to distance Flute from them.
Lute (リュート, Ryūto)
Voiced by: Kōki Miyata (TV series)
The elder brother of Flute and Sforzando's former crown prince, revered as humanity's guardian. After slaying the Hell King Bass in battle, his corpse is reanimated by Bass's surviving head, turning him into a puppet.
Chamberlain XV (チェンバレン15世, Chenbaren 15-sei)
The deceased king of Sforzendo and the father of Flute and Lute.

=== Antagonists ===
Hell King Bass (冥法王ベース, Meihō Ō Bēsu)
Voiced by: Kenichi Ogata (film), Unshō Ishizuka (TV series)
The Demon Army's supreme commander. A cunning and ruthless tactician, he manipulates Lute's corpse to move his own disembodied head. He orchestrates the Demon Army's efforts to revive Chestra.
Dragon King Drum (幻竜王ドラム, Genryū Ō Doramu)
Voiced by: Kiyoyuki Yanada (TV series)
The Demon Army's second-in-command, a dimwitted, two-headed dragon obsessed with usurping Chestra.
Warrior King Guitar (超獣王ギータ, Chōjū Ō Gīta)
Voiced by: Takashi Matsuyama (TV series)
A treacherous swordsman who preys on the weak.
Orgel (オル・ゴール, Oru Gōru)
Bass's deputy, a sadistic jester who manipulates souls with a harp-scythe. Tasked with inciting Hamel's demonic rampages.
Demon King Chestra (大魔王ケストラー, Daimaō Kesutorā)
Voiced by: Yūji Ueda (TV series)
The tyrannical progenitor of demons, sealed within Pandora's Box. He engineers Hamel's birth as a vessel for his resurrection.
Vocal (ヴォーカル, Vōkaru)
A former Demon King imprisoned for rebellion against the authority of Chestra. He is a nihilistic sadist who drains life force.

=== Other characters ===
Pandora (パンドラ)
Voiced by: Naoko Miura (TV series)
Hamel's mother, a half-angel saint. Tricked into unsealing Chestra, she is later frozen and imprisoned.
Vi Olin (ヴァイ・オリン, Vai Orin)
A reclusive inventor who crafted Pandora's Box and Hamel's violin.

== Media ==
=== Manga ===
Written and illustrated by Michiaki Watanabe, Violinist of Hameln was serialized by Enix (later Square Enix) in its shōnen manga magazine Monthly Shōnen Gangan from March 1991 to January 2001. Its chapters were collected in 37 tankōbon volumes, released from September 20, 1991, to April 22, 2001. A special chapter, titled Violinist of Hameln Gaiden: Sorekara... (ハーメルンのバイオリン弾き 外伝 それから…), was published in Square Enix Zōkan Young Gangan on November 30, 2007.

A sequel series, titled Violinist of Hameln: Shchelkunchik (ハーメルンのバイオリン弾き ～シェルクンチク～), was serialized in Square Enix's seinen manga magazine Young Gangan from January 18, 2008, to October 21, 2011. Square Enix collected its chapters in eight tankōbon volumes, released from August 25, 2008, to January 25, 2012. The sequel to the original story is set 20 years after the war against the Mazoku, following the children of Violinist of Hameln's protagonists.

Watanabe started a self-published digital series titled Zoku Violinist of Hameln (続ハーメルンのバイオリン弾き) on February 17, 2012. Ringo Promotion collects and publishes its chapters in print, under the Cocokara Comics imprint, with the first volume released on August 10, 2013. As of April 14, 2025, 22 volumes have been released.

=== Anime ===
An anime film adaptation produced by Nippon Animation was released by Shochiku on April 20, 1996.

A 25-episode anime television series, animated by Studio Deen, was broadcast on TV Tokyo from October 2, 1996, to March 26, 1997. Unlike the original manga and film, the television series adopts a darker, more dramatic tone.

=== Video game ===
A video game for the Super Famicom was released by Enix on September 29, 1995.

== Reception ==
The Violinist of Hameln manga has had over 6.8 million copies in circulation.
