= Tokyo Underground =

Japanese manga series

- Volume 1 cover

東京アンダーグラウンド (Tōkyō Andāguraundo)
- Manga
- Written by: Akinobu Uraku
- Published by: Enix
- Magazine: Monthly Shōnen Gangan
- Original run: 1997 – 2005
- Volumes: 14
- Anime television series
- Directed by: Hayato Date
- Produced by: Fukashi Azuma; Tahei Yamanishi; Ken Hagino; Naoji Hōnokidani
- Written by: Katsuyuki Sumisawa
- Music by: Akifumi Tada
- Studio: Pierrot
- Licensed by: AUS: Tokyo Night Train; Madman Entertainment; NA: Geneon Entertainment (2006–2007); Discotek Media (2018–present); UK: Manga Entertainment
- Original network: TV Tokyo
- English network: AUS: Adult Swim; CA: G4techTV (Anime Current); PH: ABS-CBN, Hero
- Original run: April 2, 2002 – September 24, 2002
- Episodes: 26

Tokyo Underground (Japanese: 東京アンダーグラウンド, Hepburn: Tōkyō Andāguraundo) is a Japanese manga series by Akinobu Uraku and published by Square Enix. It was adapted into an anime television series by Pierrot and directed by Hayato Date. It was broadcast on TV Tokyo from April to September 2002. The anime series was released on DVD by Geneon Entertainment in North America and released by Manga Entertainment in the UK and by Tokyo Night Train in Australia. It aired in Canada on the digital channel G4techTV, starting on July 22, 2007. It was also aired on ABS-CBN and Hero TV in the Philippines and Adult Swim in Australia.

== Plot ==
Under Tokyo's underground railway system is a world called Underground (地下世界(アンダーグラウンド), Andāguraundo), populated by Elemental Users, people who can manipulate various elements. When the Maiden of Life, Ruri Sarasa, and her bodyguard, Gravity User Chelsea Rorec escape to the surface, they take refuge with swordsman Rumina Asagi and his bespectacled best friend Ginnosuke Isuzu. During a battle with the flame-using Seki, Rumina is killed and then resurrected by Ruri. The revived Rumina finds he now has the power to manipulate air, a rare talent amongst the Underground people. Realizing Ruri is in danger, Rumina vows to protect her, even if it means going to the Underground to rescue her from her eventual captors before she gets sacrificed.

Rumina eventually goes to the Underground with Chelsea and Ginosuke after Ruri is kidnapped. As soon as they arrive they encounter a genetic experiment from The company but manage to escape.

== Characters ==
Rumina Asagi (浅葱 留美奈, Asagi Rumina)
Voiced by: Tomokazu Seki (Japanese); Brad Swaile (English)
Rumina is a high school student, who dreams of having a pretty girl, but ends up finding himself speechless when confronted with them. As the series begins, he is starting a new school year and wants to avoid continuing his reputation as a fighter. But he still fought with 3 boys at high school. However, as it made him appear to be scary and dangerous, his dream was crushed. One day he encounters two strange girls who change his life forever. In an effort to protect the cute Ruri from harm, Rumina fights hard, but eventually loses. Ruri's powers of life revive him, and with new life comes the amazing ability to control wind powers. Rumina joins Chelsea in protecting Ruri and joins their battle in the Tokyo Underground. He falls in love with Ruri and has some sort of romantic feelings for Chelsea as well.
Ruri Sarasa (ルリ・サラサ)
Voiced by: Haruhi Nanao (Japanese); Chantal Strand (English)
Ruri is known as the "Shrine Maiden of Life" (生命の巫女, Inochi no Mikō). She is very polite and kind, and is the type to address everyone with the honorific "-sama." She's very compassionate and shows signs of affection to Rumina. Ruri used her life powers to bring back Rumina from death when he is killed trying to protect her and Chelsea. Her unusual powers make her a target for evil forces in the Underground. The Company wants Ruri so that she can use her power to bring the dragons back to life and then use them to attack the surface world. She falls in love with Rumina. In the final volume, it is revealed that Ruri is actually a clone of Sarasa, Kashin's older sister and the original Maiden of Life. When the attempt to use Sarasa to awaken the Ron failed, Ruri was cloned to perform the task.
Chelsea Rorec (チェルシー・ローレック, Cherushī Rōrekku)
Voiced by: Kaoru Morota (Japanese); Rebecca Shoichet (English)
Chelsea is Ruri's bodyguard/tutor, and accompanies her when escaping from the Underground. Chelsea controls powers related to gravity and has a personality to match. She is very dedicated to her task of protecting Ruri, and would gladly lay down her life – in fact she spends much of the early episodes bashing Rumina on the head for being too familiar with Ruri. Chelsea's gravity-power is very strong, and she is a tough opponent. She always argues with Rumina, and the two always get into fights with each other. However, she later respects him and also develops feelings for him.
Ginnosuke Isuzu (五十鈴 銀之助, Isuzu Ginnosuke)
Voiced by: Sōichirō Hoshi (Japanese); Gabe Khouth (English)
Ginosuke is Rumina's best friend since childhood. He has no special elemental powers, but he is very intelligent although he isn't exactly what one would refer to as 'street smart'. He later uses a very useful weapon that fires elemental attacks. His personality is somewhat timid, but he has a lot of common sense, and can be very fierce if he has to be. Ginosuke always wears his very thick glasses that change his appearance so much that his friends can't recognize him without them.

=== Allies ===
Sui (翠(スイ))
A rebel against the company who uses an Aerogun. Referred to Ginnosuke as "Master Sui" after he saved him from Company agents. Hates the Company after they took his lover away and destroyed the village they were living in. Joins in on the fight again Pairon's Fang and discovers his lover was a mind-control puppet of Sound. He is able to restore her memories after the fight. Later searches for Rumina's group in the slums and joins Ginnosuke's team in the Tournament.
Shiel Messiah (シエル・メサイア, Shieru Mesaia)
Shiel is an Electric User who is first seen as a Company Agent sent out to confirm Rumina's elemental powers. Following the recapturing of Ruri by Company agents Pairon and Teil, she is assigned as her replacement bodyguard. As their relationship deepens, Shiel undergoes a change of heart (much like Chelsea) and helps Ruri escape for a second time. She views Ruri as a sister following their time together.
Emily Ronolf (エミリア・ルナリーフ, Emiria Runarīfu; Emilia Lunareef)
Member #2 of the Rorec Fan Club, helps Rumina's group for the sake of Chelsea. Beings to notice the Company's corruption after seeing Pairon's look upon Rumina. After falling to the slums, she becomes part of Ginnosuke's team in the tournament in hopes to find Rumina and Chelsea.
Jilherts Micheat (ジルハーツ・ミセット, Jiruhātsu Misetto)
Member #3 of the Rorec Fan Club; she can be found to be violent when someone insults Chelsea, such as Rumina calling Chelsea "blondie". After falling to the slums, she becomes part of Ginnosuke's team in the tournament in hopes to find Rumina and Chelsea.
Kourin (高(コウ)麗(リン), Kōrin; "Goryeo")
A Magnetism User and younger brother to Rou. Desires to be an A-Class Soldier to the company, better than Kashin and Seki. When Pairon gave him the opportunity by killing Rumina's group, he took it with his brother joining him in the effort. When he lost, as Pairon foresaw, he was sent down to the slums with Rumina's group, Rou, and Shamuri. Despite his differences, he joins Rumina's team in the Tournament to get out of the slums and find his brother. Uses metal yo-yos as his weapons. He seems to have concerns and feelings for a beast-hybrid girl, 04.
04(レイヨン) (Reiyon)
A hybrid-beast girl who rounds up Rumina, Chelsea, and Kourin to participate in the Tournament, in order to gain a wish from the Slum's mysterious leader. Wants to get out of the slums so she kind find info on helping her with her condition: if she fights too much she can get feral, resulting in using too much energy and might die. Kourin knows of her condition and promises to help her out.

=== The Company ===
The Company (公司(カンパニー)) contains thousands of elemental users, and most are hostile. They wish to bring complete destruction to those who dwell on the surface. Their hatred for the surface world stems from the belief that they were abandoned by them, which really isn't true since only the scientists actually knew of their existence underground. They are also the people who want to awaken the dragons (called "ron") to complete their revenge and are willing to sacrifice Ruri to accomplish their goal. Chelsea and Shiel both turn against the company in order to get Ruri (Maiden of Life) to safety and away from the company.

Lord Kashin (華(カ)泰(シン))
The leader/founder of the Company, ranked #1. He organized the Company to make the Underground a better place. He strongly desires to take revenge on the surface, after he was forced to kill his sister who was attached to a machine by the scientists. Because of how Ruri remind Kashin of his sister, he's shown to be very caring toward her; he even was very upset at Pairon for upsetting her. Also, Seki is his long-time friend. It is later revealed that Kashin's sister was actually the original Maiden of Life, and Ruri was cloned from her when the attempt to use her to revive the Ron failed.
Pairon (白(パイ)龍(ロン); Bailong) "White Dragon"
Ranked #2 in the Company and has Ruri's custody in his jurisdiction. Proven to be the most sinister and cunning member in the Company. Pairon is a "Pure" Water user, permitting him to be unaffected by electricity and subdue people by their blood (a person's body is 80% made of water). Compared to everyone in the Underground, he has no background information, which gave Seki concerns. Has a hatred toward Kashin, especially when he gave him the scars on his face.
Kasagami (崇(スイ)神(ジェン), Suijen)
Ranked #3 in the Company, a scientist in charge of finding where the Ron are sealed. Reports to Pairon on his efforts.
Seki (赤(セキ); "Red")
Ranked #5 in the Company, a Fire user, one of the 8 A-class warriors, and co-founder/long-time friend of Kashin. The first Company agent sent after Ruri and Chelsea and originally killed Rumina. Impressed of Rumina's wind powers after being revived by Ruri. Suspicious of Pairon methods and activities as he has no background info left behind by the scientists.
Tailor Ashford (テイル・アシュフォード, Teiru Ashufōdo)
The highest-ranked soldier of the Company. A reckless Water-user who loves a challenge. Went with Pairon to capture Ruri at Rumina's school. After being defeated by Rumina, he was determined for a rematch, which he did at the Underground Hole. When Rumina tried to save him, Tailor told him about the Underground's bitterness toward the surface, especially when his poor parents sold him to the scientists. He removed Rumina's grip and fell down the Underground Hole, claiming he will not die and will cross paths with Rumina again. Also, referred to by Rumina as "pony-tail".
Rou (羅(ロウ), Rō)
A large magnetism-user. Fought Chelsea and Rumina in an Underground village and lost. Later, joined his younger brother Kourin(another magnetism user) to fight Rumina and the others, but lost again. After being thrown to the Slums, join Ginnosuke's group in the Tournament in hopes to find his younger brother.
Sharma Rufus (シャルマ・ルフィス, Sharuma Rufisu)
A female ice-user who wields a whip. Fought Chelsea at the Underground Hole and lost. Been spying on Rumina's group afterwards, planning a rematch with Chelsea, but ends up in the Slums. Found by Shiel and joins Rumina's team in the Tournament in hopes of getting out of the slums.
Pairon's Fang
A band of highly or death-sentenced criminals who help Pairon keep the "peace" and search for power-users. Sent after Ruri during her second escape and kill Rumina's group. They were all defeated before Ruri was re-captured by Pairon. Members: Heat, a big guy who uses heat energy for explosions and superstrength (defeated by Chelsea); Smoke, a swordsman with smoke generating powers and multiple bladed weapons (defeated by Rumina); Sound Illusion; a sadistic child who uses sound vibration attacks and a flute to mind control people into his slaves, like Sui's lover (defeated after being fooled by Jilherts that she was under his control); and Shadow, a female who uses nerve gas to fool people she can move between shadows (defeated by Ginnosuke with his aerogun).

=== The Ron ===
Like the elemental power user humans, the Ron were created by the same scientists. According to Chelsea, they physically resemble dragons of mythology but are merely artificial forms of life. The Ron lie dormant, but the Company intends to use Ruri's power of life to revive them and set them upon the surface world to punish those who had wronged them so many years ago. The Ron share the same bitterness as most of the Underground humans. When they are finally seen, it is revealed that in their dormant state the Ron resemble dolphins, and only become the dragon-like life forms through the Maiden's power.
