= Akira Kojima =

Japanese manga artist

Akira Kojima (小島 あきら, Kojima Akira) is a Japanese manga artist from Ibaraki Prefecture, Japan, who works for Square Enix. He is best known for Mahoraba, which was published in Gangan WING and adapted as an anime television show broadcast on TV Tokyo. He often represented himself in Mahoraba as a monolith with eyes and limbs.

== Works ==
- Mahoraba
- Manabiya
- Seiken Shōjo Maniacs
- Wa!
- Yonakano Reijini Haremu Wo!
- Mahou moto Shoujo Meruhen Kururu
