= Haruichi =

Haruichi is a Japanese given name. Notable people with the name include:

- Haruichi Furudate (古舘 春一; born 1983), Japanese manga artist
- Haruichi Shindō (新藤 晴一; born 1974), Japanese musician and guitarist for Japanese rock band Porno Graffitti
- Haruichi Izumo (出いず雲も ハルイチ), scion of Izumo Tech
