= Switch (manga) =

Shōnen manga and anime series

- English cover of the first manga volume
- Genre: Adventure, thriller
- Manga
- Written by: Otoh Saki
- Illustrated by: Tomomi Nakamura
- Published by: Square Enix
- English publisher: NA: Viz Media
- Magazine: Monthly GFantasy
- Original run: 2002 – October 2008
- Volumes: 13
- Original video animation
- Directed by: Oohira Naoki
- Studio: Actas
- Released: October 24, 2008 – February 25, 2009
- Runtime: 30 minutes each
- Episodes: 2

Switch (stylized as switch) is a Japanese manga series written by Otoh Saki and illustrated by Tomomi Nakamura. It was serialized in Square Enix's GFantasy from 2002 to October 2008. The individual chapters were collected and published in 13 tankōbon volumes by Square Enix, with the first volume released on June 21, 2002, and the final volume released on December 27, 2008. The manga focuses on the lives of two Japanese undercover narcotic police, Eto Kai and Kurabayashi Hal.

Switch was animated as 2 OVAs by Actas. Square Enix released a series of 4 vocal CDs for Switch.

== Story ==
Two new investigators at the Narcotics Control Department in Japan, Kurabayashi Hal and Eto Kai, struggle against drug dealers, gangs, murderers, psychopaths, and mysterious organizations, in particular the notorious drug ring known as Ryuugen. But the gentle and caring one of the group, Kai, has problems of his own: he can become a cold-blooded, killing machine under certain scenarios. As the NCD works toward bringing down Ryuugen, however, answers began to arise, threatening to reveal the truth behind Kai's alter ego and exactly who the young criminal investigator is.

== Characters ==
Kai Etō (衛藤 快, Etō Kai)
Voiced by: Jun Fukuyama
A 22-year-old new criminal investigator for Kanto Region's Narcotic Control Department. When conflicted with anything that involves pain or extreme emotional hurt to him, Kai might switch to a violent alter ego who has no problem in harming others, though Kai himself is gentle and reluctant to do anything dangerous or hurtful to others. When Kai was 6 years old, his parents were killed by Sawaki. Kai's violent persona awoke to protect him, and it was due to Hal's father's hypnotic signal that his violent persona sank, bringing with it his memories of the murder and of the mysterious drug "switch". When Kai is in his usual caring self, he doesn't remember anything about "switch" or his parents' murder. Kai's aunt adopted him, thus changing his family name from Kosaka to Etō. Kai is extremely caring and loyal towards Hal, even to the point of being willing to die for him. He gets very worried whenever Hal is on a dangerous mission.
Hal Kurabayashi (倉林 春, Kurabayashi Haru)
Voiced by: Sakurai Takahiro
A new investigator and he works with Kai Etō as partners. Known as the "brilliant new investigator" to most of the Drug Enforcement Division of the Kantō region, he is almost always focused on his work. He also often uses his charm and good looks to his advantage to gather information, whether from men or women. Despite being rather stoic and seemingly uncaring, he is very protective of Kai.
Masataka Hiki (比企 真孝, Hiki Masataka)
Voiced by: Junichi Suwabe
The director of the Drug Enforcement Division of the Kantō region. He is a young director, being only 32 years old, the same age as Kajiyama. Despite his cheerful and easygoing demeanor, he is actually extremely analytical and a brilliant detective.
Keigo Kajiyama (梶山 慶護, Kajiyama Keigo)
Voiced by: Kazuya Nakai
The Chief of Investigations for the Kanto Narcotics Department. He is 32 years old, and tends to be rash in his decisions.
Sawaki (澤木, Sawaki)
A higher-up of Ryuugen, a Chinese smuggling drug ring. He is "The Left Arm of Ryuugen" (this position stands for the gang's no.3 leader).
Akaha (赤羽 アカハ, Akaha)
The personal assistant/subordinate to Sawaki. In addition, he is the "Right Arm of Ryuugen" (stands for the gang's no.2 leader). When he is absent from Ryuugen, Sawaki protects him by giving orders as the Right Arm and confuses the NCD to buy time for Akaha to complete his mission. When Akaha was a child, his parents were killed by Sawaki, but Sawaki spared Akaha. In Volume 13, Akaha died in an attempt to protect Sawaki.
Akimune Narita (成田, Narita)
A detective from the Meguro Department, 38 years old. He has been known to be a sort of rival for the NCD, constantly in a game of who can catch the bad guy first. Compared to many in the NCD who take their work seriously, Narita is more laid back while doing his work.
Kuzui Mari (マリ, Kuzui Mari)
A 28-year-old narcotics control officer. She is an expert researcher of drugs and has also proven to be helpful in investigating cases. She likes small, cute things and has a significant crush on Kai, of which everyone in the NCD (excluding Kai himself) is aware of.

== Media ==
=== Manga ===
No.	Original release date	Original ISBN	English release date	English ISBN
1	June 21, 2002	978-4-7575-0744-9	March 11, 2008	978-1-4215-1764-3
2	December, 2002	978-4-7575-0851-4	May 13, 2008	978-1-4215-1765-0
3	July 26, 2003	978-4-7575-0988-7	July 8, 2008	978-1-4215-1766-7
4	November 27, 2008	978-4-7575-1075-3	September 9, 2008	978-1-4215-1767-4
5	March 27, 2004	978-4-7575-1171-2	November 11, 2008	978-1-4215-1768-1
6	September 27, 2004	978-4-7575-1285-6	January 13, 2009	978-1-4215-1769-8
7	February 26, 2005	978-4-7575-1377-8	March 10, 2009	978-1-4215-1770-4
8	August 18, 2005	978-4-7575-1513-0	May 12, 2009	978-1-4215-2230-2
9	February 26, 2006	978-4-7575-1634-2	July 14, 2009	978-1-4215-2231-9
10	August 26, 2006	978-4-7575-1754-7	September 15, 2009	978-1-4215-2232-6
11	August 27, 2007	978-4-7575-2093-6	November 10, 2009	978-1-4215-2924-0
12	March 27, 2008	978-4-7575-2258-9	January 12, 2010	978-1-4215-2931-8
13	December 27, 2008	978-4-7575-2451-4	March 9, 2010	978-1-4215-3271-4

=== OVAs ===
It was announced in June 2008 that an animated adaptation of the manga series would be produced. The first original animated video, directed by Oohira Naoki, was released by Actas on October 24, 2008, and the second due to be released on February 25, 2009.

The opening theme is "Find Out" and the ending theme is "Your Hand". Both are performed by MIRANOSAND.

=== Character songs ===
Square Enix released a series of four vocal CDs for Switch. The first CD, character song for Kai Etō (衛藤 快, Etō Kai), Come up smiling, was released on October 22, 2004. The second CD, character song for Masataka Hiki (比企 真孝, Hiki Masataka), Believe in Love, was released on November 25, 2004. The third CD, character song for Mamoru Kei Kajiyama (梶山 慶護, Kajiyama Keigo), Wild beast, was released on December 22, 2004. The final CD, character song for Hal Kurabayashi (倉林 春, Kurabayashi Hal), Somewhere, was released on January 26, 2005.

== Reception ==
Anime News Network's Carlo Santos praised Switch Volume 1 for "occasional wordless scenes help to create some strong emotional moments" but he criticized the manga for having "awkward plotting and confusing action scenes". Anime News Network's Casey Brienza criticized Switch Volume 2 for having "confusing, poorly considered artwork and mediocre story lines". IGN's A.E. Sparrow commends the manga for its "clean linework".
