= Akinobu Uraku =

Japanese manga artist (born 1977)

Akinobu Uraku 有楽 彰展
- Born: September 22, 1977 (age 49); Hyōgo Prefecture, Japan
- Occupation: Manga artist
- Writing career
- Period: 1997–present
- Genre: Fiction
- Subject: Shōnen manga

Akinobu Uraku (有楽 彰展, Uraku Akinobu; born September 22, 1977) is a Japanese manga artist best known for creating Tokyo Underground. Uraku won one of two grand prizes (the other winner being Diachiken Ise) at the 4th Enix 21st Century Manga Awards in 1997 for his work Yojō Mahō Shoriban. This story was later published in the February 1997 issue of Monthly G Fantasy.

In 2002, Tokyo Underground was adapted into an anime television series aired on TV Tokyo. Uraku made a cameo appearance as a student in the first episode of that series.

== Works ==
- Yojō Mahō Shoriban (余剰魔法処理班) (1997, Monthly G Fantasy)
- Tokyo Underground (14 volumes, January 1998 – March 2005, Monthly Shōnen Gangan)
- Onikirisama no Hakoirimusume (four volumes, July 2006 – November 2010, Monthly Shōnen Gangan)
