= Mahoraba =

Japanese manga series

- Cover of the first manga volume

まほらば
- Genre: Romance, slice of life
- Manga
- Written by: Akira Kojima
- Published by: Enix (2000–03); Square Enix (2003–06)
- Magazine: Monthly Gangan Wing
- Original run: November 2000 – July 2006
- Volumes: 12
- Anime television series

Mahoraba ~Heartful Days
- Directed by: Shinichiro Kimura
- Music by: bice
- Studio: J.C.Staff
- Licensed by: NA: Discotek Media
- Original network: TV Tokyo
- Original run: January 10, 2005 – June 26, 2005
- Episodes: 26

Mahoraba (まほらば; lit. 'Splendid Place') is a Japanese manga series by Akira Kojima. It was serialized in Square Enix' Monthly Gangan WING manga magazine between November 2000 and July 2006, spanning a total of 12 tankōbon volumes. An anime television series adaptation titled Mahoraba: Heartful Days (まほらば〜Heartful days), was animated by J.C.Staff, aired on TV Tokyo from January 10, 2005, to June 26, 2005, spanning a total of 26 episodes.

== Plot ==
Ryushi Shiratori wants to become a children's picture book writer, and he moves to an apartment, Narutaki-Sou (Narutaki Villa), in order to go to an art school in Tokyo. Narutaki-Sou is an old Japanese style one-story house which doesn't fit in urban scenery. The complex is owned by his mother's cousin and the manager of the apartment is his second cousin, Kozue Aoba. They met each other when they were children, but Shiratori does not remember much of it. Unbeknownst to her eccentric personality, Ryushi moves to Narutaki-Sou to realize his dream.

== Characters ==
=== Narutaki-sou residents ===
- Kozue Aoba (蒼葉 梢, Aoba Kozue) is the landlady of Narutaki-sou and Ryūshi's 16-year-old second cousin. She attends the same high school as Tamami. Kozue has several different personalities that come out when she experiences different emotions, but returns to her original one after sleeping or passing out.
- Saki Akasaka (蒼葉 梢, Akasaka Saki) is a caring and tough girl who appears when Kozue is surprised or angered. She is an extreme lightweight, and unable to tolerate anything but umeshu (in the manga), in the anime she can't even smell liquor without passing out.
- Nanako Kanazawa (金沢 魚子, Kanazawa Nanako) is a curious and playful residence of Narutaki-sou.
- Chiyuri Midorikawa (緑川 千百合, Midorikawa Chiyuri) is a girl who loves cosplay.
- Natsume Konno (紺野 棗, Konno Natsume) is a shy girl who initially avoided speaking to people. She is skilled at sleight of hand and card tricks.

==== By room number ====
- Tamami Chanohata (茶ノ畑 珠実, Chanohata Tamami) is Kozue's close classmate who always has a camera and likes to take pictures of Kozue in embarrassing situations. She is also an inactive member of the occult club with her.
- Ryūshi Shiratori (白鳥 隆士, Shiratori Ryūshi) is the main protagonist of the series who is an aspiring children's book author. Ryūshi moved into Narutaki Sou so he could attend the Sumeragi Design School in Tokyo.
- Megumi Momono (桃乃 恵, Momono Megumi) is a student of Washida University for one year, but it turned out to be too expensive, so she took a year-off.
- Sayoko Kurosaki (黒崎 沙夜子, Kurosaki Sayoko) is an irresponsible girl from a wealthy family whose father is a talented sculptor. Despite her evident uselessness throughout the series, she cares for Asami.
- Asami Kurosaki (黒崎 朝美, Kurosaki Asami) is a girl who lives in room 5 with only her adopted mother since her adopted father died when she was younger. She keeps things together despite her mother's problems, pulling most of the workload at home and keeping track of expenses.
- Yukio Haibara (灰原 由起夫, Haibara Yukio) is a boy with ventriloquism to speak through his puppet, Johnny.
- Johnny Ryūsei (流星 ジョニー, Ryūsei Jonī) is Yukio Haibara's hand-puppet of a brown dog through whom the latter speaks using ventriloquism. They both act as if the puppet were really the one speaking; Johnny often "speaks" as if Haibara is the extra part. It is revealed near the end of the manga that Johnny was "born" when Haibara was at a loss as to how to get the sad and lonely Kozue to talk to him after her parents left her.

=== Sumeragi (Imperial) Design School ===
- Miyabi Shirogane (銀 雅, Shirogane Miyabi) is Shiratori's teacher. Students who are disobedient or forget their homework are subjected to "the mysterious closet", which apparently is a frightful ordeal. She has a habit of having her eyes half open and talking happily.
- Tsubasa Yamabuki (山吹 翼, Yamabuki Tsubasa) is Shiratori's classmate who is always trying to impress young women.
- Risona Aizawa (藍沢 理想奈, Aizawa Risona) is Shiratori's classmate who wears glasses and is a devoted fan of manga.
- Mizuho Amane (亜麻根 瑞穂, Amane Mizuho) is Shiratori's classmate who uses her batting skills to punish Tsubasa for his womanizing. She normally uses a spiked baseball bat, but because of the adults' circumstances, it was taken away and replaced with a plastic megaphone.

=== Seika Tandai Fuzoku High School ===
- Erika Vermilion (エリカ·バーミリオン, Erika Bāmirion) is head of the occult research lab, where Tamami and Kozue are technically members.
- Hiro Utsugi (空木 尋, Utsugi Hiro) is Sakura's younger sister who serves as club president and conductor.

=== Asami's Classmates ===
- Satsuki "Sa-chan" Matsuba (松葉 五月, Matsuba Satsuki) is Asami's classmate who speaks in Kansai dialect. She tries to keep control of Michiyo's haughty attitude, often using heavy texts such as dictionaries or telephone books as punishment.
- Michiyo Asagi (浅葱 三千代, Asagi Michiyo) is Asami's rich and slightly snobby classmate. She is often seen with old-fashioned poses with her fan.

=== Futaba Ginza shops ===
- Asahi Chigusa (千草 旭, Chigusa Asahi) is a baker whose bakery is famous for its taiyaki.
- Huang Youli (黄有麗(ホァンヨウリー), Hwang Youli) is one of the bakers who is known for going through several unrelated jobs in quick succession.

=== Minazuki residence ===
- Ushimitsu Minazuki (水無月 丑三, Minazuki Ushimitsu) is Sayoko's father who works as a sculptor and tends to be controlling.
- Yu Minazuki (水無月 夕, Minazuki Yū) is Sayoko's mother who cannot stand sunlight, thus much more active at night. Yū walks with a cane, which she applies to her husband's feet when he is rude.
- Mahiru Minazuki (水無月 まひる, Minazuki Mahiru) is Sayoko's younger sister and Asami's aunt. Having lived in Italy since childhood, she is somewhat awkward at speaking Japanese.
- Tachibana (タチバナ) is the senior maid of the Minazuki household. Despite her tough appearance, she has a soft spot for things like teddy bears. Tachibana is conscious of her height, thinking herself to be too tall (at the shrine, her wish is to shrink). She is over-protective of Mahiru.
- Sakura Utsugi (空木 桜, Utsugi Sakura) is one of the maids of the Minazuki household. Sakura's careless and clumsy personality often lands her in trouble.

== Manga ==
Manga volumes
Name	Date published	ISBN	Name	Date published	ISBN
Mahoraba volume 1	July 2001	4-7575-0501-9	Mahoraba volume 7	September 2004	4-7575-1278-3
Mahoraba volume 2	January 2002	4-7575-0625-2	Mahoraba volume 8	December 2004	4-7575-1329-1
Mahoraba volume 3	July 2002	4-7575-0750-X	Mahoraba volume 8	December 2004	4-7575-1329-1
Mahoraba volume 4	December 2002	4-7575-0848-4	Mahoraba volume 9	March 2005	4-7575-1415-8
Mahoraba volume 5	September 2003	4-7575-1039-X	Mahoraba volume 10	October 2005	4-7575-1531-6
Mahoraba volume 5	September 2003	4-7575-1040-3	Mahoraba volume 11	April 2006	4-7575-1675-4
Mahoraba volume 6	December 2003	4-7575-1115-9	Mahoraba volume 12	July 2006	4-7575-1728-9

== Anime ==
=== Episodes ===
No.	Title
1	""Welcome to Narutaki-sou" (ようこそ鳴滝荘へ, Yōkoso Narutaki-sō e)"
2	"The Landlady's Secret" (大家さんのひみつ, Ōka-san no Himitsu)"
3	""The Precious Place" (たいせつな場所, Taisetsuna Basho)"
4	""Warm and Fuzzy" (ぬくぬく, Meku-meku)"
5	""Nega-Posi" (ネガポジ, Nega-Poshi)"
6	""Tama Check" (珠チェック, Tama Chekku)"
7	""Hide and Seek" (かくれんぼ, Kakurenbo)"
8	""Shopping" (おかいモノ, Okaimono)"
9	""Correct-o" (これくと, Korekuto)"
10	""Sketch" (スケッチ, Suketchi)"
11	""Affection" (想い。。。, Omoi...)"
12	""Summer! Swimsuits! Beach Time!" (夏だ！水着だ！海水浴だ！, Natsuda! Mizugi da! Kaisuiyoku da!)"
13	""Narutaki-sou's Treasure" (鳴滝荘のタカラモノ, Narutaki-sō no Takaramono)"
14	""At the End of Summer" (夏の終わりに, Natsu no Owari ni)"
15	""...Maybe" (。。。かも, ...Kamo)"
16	""Guests After Guests" (千客万来, Senkyakubanrai)"
17	""Color of the Sky" (そらのいろ, Sora no Iro)"
18	""Meow Meow Meow" (にゃーにゃーにゃー, Nyā Nyā Nyā)"
19	""Everyone's Day" (みんなの一日, Minna no Ichinichi)"
20	""School Festival" (学園祭にて, Gakuen-sai ni te)"
21	""Mother and Daughter" (親·子, Oyako)"
22	""Important..." (大事..., Daiji)"
23	""Among the Red Leaves" (紅葉の中で, Kōyō no Naka de)"
24	""Bells" (すず, Suzu)"
25	""Night of Revelation" (告げる夜, Tsugeru Yoru)"
26	""Heartful Days""
