= Prunus Girl =

Japanese manga series

- Volume 1 cover

プラナス・ガール (Puranasu Gāru)
- Manga
- Written by: Tomoki Matsumoto
- Published by: Square Enix
- Magazine: Gangan Joker
- Original run: 22 April 2009 – 22 April 2013
- Volumes: 6

Prunus Girl (Japanese: プラナス・ガール, Hepburn: Puranasu Gāru) is a Japanese shōnen manga series by Tomoki Matsumoto. After two pilot chapters published in 2008 and 2009, the series began publication in Square Enix's Gangan Joker magazine in 2009. and was compiled into six volumes. Soleil Productions licensed the series for publication in France.

== Synopsis ==
While looking at the high school entrance exam results, Maki meets his future classmate Aikawa Kizuna, who he thinks is a beautiful woman but who turns out to really be a cross-dressing man.

== Volumes ==
The series has been compiled into six tankōbon volumes.

No.	Release date	ISBN
1	22 August 2009	978-4-7575-2656-3
2	20 March 2010	978-4-7575-2825-3
3	22 November 2010	978-4-7575-3069-0
4	22 August 2011	978-4-7575-3338-7
5	22 May 2012	978-4-7575-3603-6
6	22 August 2013	978-4-7575-4013-2
