= List of Higurashi When They Cry titles =

The Japanese series logo

The Higurashi When They Cry visual novel series is originally produced by the Japanese dōjin soft maker 07th Expansion, but features games produced in collaboration with Alchemist and Twilight Frontier. The games take place in the fictional Japanese town of Hinamizawa, and the stories revolve around a group of young friends and the strange events that occur in the village. The games have been released for Microsoft Windows PCs, the PlayStation 2, and the Nintendo DS handheld console. Higurashi no Naku Koro ni is a series of murder mystery visual novels that requires relatively little player interaction as most of the gameplay is composed of reading text which signifies either dialogue between characters or the inner thoughts of the protagonist who the player assumes. The games utilize intermissions where the player can obtain several TIPS which allow the player to read various supplementary information that may or may not be useful in solving the mystery.

The series debuted in Japan on August 10, 2002, with Onikakushi-hen, the first in a series of eight original games divided into the "question arcs" consisting of the first four games, and the "answer arcs" consisting of the latter four. The answer arcs shared the common title Higurashi no Naku Koro ni Kai. An additional fandisc known as Higurashi no Naku Koro ni Rei followed, and was the final game in the series produced by 07th Expansion. The eight original PC games were released in English by MangaGamer with the first four games released in December 2009. The last four games, however, were released individually starting with Meakashi-hen in February 2010. Alchemist has released six more games based on the original series, two for the PlayStation 2 and four for the Nintendo DS. Twilight Frontier produced a dōjin game 3D versus third-person shooter game entitled Higurashi Daybreak which was later ported to the PlayStation Portable by Cavia and Alchemist.

== Original releases ==
=== Higurashi no Naku Koro ni ===
Title	Details
Higurashi no Naku Koro ni Onikakushi-hen Original release date(s): JP: August 10, 2002; WW: December 15, 2009; FRA: October 31, 2009	Release years by system: 2002—Microsoft Windows PC
Higurashi no Naku Koro ni Onikakushi-hen Original release date(s): JP: August 10, 2002; WW: December 15, 2009; FRA: October 31, 2009	Notes: Published and developed by 07th Expansion; English localization by MangaGamer; French localization by Saffran Prod
Higurashi no Naku Koro ni Watanagashi-hen Original release date(s): JP: December 29, 2002; WW: December 15, 2009; FRA: October 31, 2009	Release years by system: 2002—Microsoft Windows PC
Higurashi no Naku Koro ni Watanagashi-hen Original release date(s): JP: December 29, 2002; WW: December 15, 2009; FRA: October 31, 2009	Notes: Published and developed by 07th Expansion; English localization by MangaGamer; French localization by Saffran Prod
Higurashi no Naku Koro ni Tatarigoroshi-hen Original release date(s): JP: August 15, 2003; WW: December 15, 2009; FRA: July 1, 2010	Release years by system: 2003—Microsoft Windows PC
Higurashi no Naku Koro ni Tatarigoroshi-hen Original release date(s): JP: August 15, 2003; WW: December 15, 2009; FRA: July 1, 2010	Notes: Published and developed by 07th Expansion; English localization by MangaGamer; French localization by Saffran Prod
Higurashi no Naku Koro ni Himatsubushi-hen Original release date(s): JP: August 13, 2004; WW: December 15, 2009; FRA: July 1, 2010	Release years by system: 2004—Microsoft Windows PC
Higurashi no Naku Koro ni Himatsubushi-hen Original release date(s): JP: August 13, 2004; WW: December 15, 2009; FRA: July 1, 2010	Notes: Published and developed by 07th Expansion; English localization by MangaGamer; French localization by Saffran Prod

=== Higurashi no Naku Koro ni Kai ===
Title	Details
Higurashi no Naku Koro ni Kai Meakashi-hen Original release date(s): JP: December 30, 2004; WW: February 28, 2010; FRA: May 21, 2011	Release years by system: 2004—Microsoft Windows PC
Higurashi no Naku Koro ni Kai Meakashi-hen Original release date(s): JP: December 30, 2004; WW: February 28, 2010; FRA: May 21, 2011	Notes: Published and developed by 07th Expansion; English localization by MangaGamer; French localization by Saffran Prod
Higurashi no Naku Koro ni Kai Tsumihoroboshi-hen Original release date(s): JP: August 14, 2005; WW: April 15, 2010; FRA: May 21, 2011	Release years by system: 2005—Microsoft Windows PC
Higurashi no Naku Koro ni Kai Tsumihoroboshi-hen Original release date(s): JP: August 14, 2005; WW: April 15, 2010; FRA: May 21, 2011	Notes: Published and developed by 07th Expansion; English localization by MangaGamer; French localization by Saffran Prod
Higurashi no Naku Koro ni Kai Minagoroshi-hen Original release date(s): JP: December 30, 2005; WW: May 31, 2010; FRA: May 25, 2012	Release years by system: 2005—Microsoft Windows PC
Higurashi no Naku Koro ni Kai Minagoroshi-hen Original release date(s): JP: December 30, 2005; WW: May 31, 2010; FRA: May 25, 2012	Notes: Published and developed by 07th Expansion; English localization by MangaGamer; French localization by Saffran Prod
Higurashi no Naku Koro ni Kai Matsuribayashi-hen Original release date(s): JP: August 13, 2006; WW: July 15, 2010; FRA: May 25, 2012	Release years by system: 2006—Microsoft Windows PC
Higurashi no Naku Koro ni Kai Matsuribayashi-hen Original release date(s): JP: August 13, 2006; WW: July 15, 2010; FRA: May 25, 2012	Notes: Published and developed by 07th Expansion; English localization by MangaGamer; French localization by Saffran Prod

=== Higurashi no Naku Koro ni Rei ===
Title	Details
Higurashi no Naku Koro ni Rei Original release date(s): JP: December 31, 2006; WW: June 3, 2022	Release years by system: 2006—Microsoft Windows PC
Higurashi no Naku Koro ni Rei Original release date(s): JP: December 31, 2006; WW: June 3, 2022	Notes: Published and developed by 07th Expansion; English localization by MangaGamer

== Expanded releases ==
=== Higurashi no Naku Koro ni Matsuri ===
Title	Details
Higurashi no Naku Koro ni Matsuri Original release date(s): JP: February 22, 2007	Release years by system: 2007—PlayStation 2
Higurashi no Naku Koro ni Matsuri Original release date(s): JP: February 22, 2007	Notes: Published and developed by Alchemist
Higurashi no Naku Koro ni Matsuri: Kakera Asobi Original release date(s): JP: December 20, 2007	Release years by system: 2007—PlayStation 2
Higurashi no Naku Koro ni Matsuri: Kakera Asobi Original release date(s): JP: December 20, 2007	Notes: Published and developed by Alchemist

=== Higurashi no Naku Koro ni Kizuna ===
Title	Details
Higurashi no Naku Koro ni Kizuna: Daiichikan Tatari Original release date(s): JP: June 26, 2008	Release years by system: 2008—Nintendo DS
Higurashi no Naku Koro ni Kizuna: Daiichikan Tatari Original release date(s): JP: June 26, 2008	Notes: Published and developed by Alchemist
Higurashi no Naku Koro ni Kizuna: Dainikan Sō Original release date(s): JP: November 27, 2008	Release years by system: 2008—Nintendo DS
Higurashi no Naku Koro ni Kizuna: Dainikan Sō Original release date(s): JP: November 27, 2008	Notes: Published and developed by Alchemist
Higurashi no Naku Koro ni Kizuna: Daisankan Rasen Original release date(s): JP: May 28, 2009	Release years by system: 2009—Nintendo DS
Higurashi no Naku Koro ni Kizuna: Daisankan Rasen Original release date(s): JP: May 28, 2009	Notes: Published and developed by Alchemist
Higurashi no Naku Koro ni Kizuna: Daiyonkan Kizuna Original release date(s): JP: February 25, 2010	Release years by system: 2010—Nintendo DS
Higurashi no Naku Koro ni Kizuna: Daiyonkan Kizuna Original release date(s): JP: February 25, 2010	Notes: Published and developed by Alchemist

=== Higurashi no Naku Koro ni Hō ===
Title	Details
Higurashi no Naku Koro ni Hō Original release date(s): JP: August 17, 2014; WW: November 9, 2023	Release years by system: 2014—Microsoft Windows PC 2018—Nintendo Switch 2019—PlayStation 4
Higurashi no Naku Koro ni Hō Original release date(s): JP: August 17, 2014; WW: November 9, 2023	Notes: Published and developed by 07th Expansion; English localization by MangaGamer; Console ports published by Entergram; Console versions include all content from Sui, in addition to three Hō-exclusive arcs updated with the same presentation.
Higurashi no Naku Koro ni Hō + Original release date(s): JP: January 28, 2022; WW: November 9, 2023	Release years by system: 2022—Microsoft Windows PC
Higurashi no Naku Koro ni Hō + Original release date(s): JP: January 28, 2022; WW: November 9, 2023	Notes: Published and developed by 07th Expansion; English localization by MangaGamer

=== Higurashi no Naku Koro ni Sui ===
Title	Details
Higurashi no Naku Koro ni Sui Original release date(s): JP: March 12, 2015	Release years by system: 2015—PlayStation 3, PlayStation Vita
Higurashi no Naku Koro ni Sui Original release date(s): JP: March 12, 2015	Notes: Published by Kaga Create; Includes all 19 chapters of the console ports previously included in the Kizuna series, and also the drama CD arc, Hajisarashi-hen. All the arcs are now fully voiced.

== Other series ==
=== Higurashi Daybreak ===
Title	Details
Higurashi Daybreak Original release date(s): JP: August 13, 2006	Release years by system: 2006—Microsoft Windows PC
Higurashi Daybreak Original release date(s): JP: August 13, 2006	Notes: Published and developed by Twilight Frontier
Higurashi Daybreak Kai Original release date(s): JP: April 22, 2007	Release years by system: 2007—Microsoft Windows PC
Higurashi Daybreak Kai Original release date(s): JP: April 22, 2007	Notes: Published and developed by Twilight Frontier
Higurashi Daybreak Portable Original release date(s): JP: November 27, 2008	Release years by system: 2008—PlayStation Portable
Higurashi Daybreak Portable Original release date(s): JP: November 27, 2008	Notes: Published by Alchemist and developed by Cavia
Higurashi Daybreak Portable Mega Edition Original release date(s): JP: November 26, 2009	Release years by system: 2009—PlayStation Portable
Higurashi Daybreak Portable Mega Edition Original release date(s): JP: November 26, 2009	Notes: Published by Alchemist and developed by Cavia
