= I Think Our Son Is Gay =

Japanese manga series

- Volume 1 cover art

うちの息子はたぶんゲイ (Uchi no Musuko wa Tabun Gei)
- Genre: Comedy, slice of life
- Manga
- Written by: Okura
- Published by: Square Enix
- English publisher: NA: Square Enix
- Magazine: Gangan Pixiv
- Original run: August 16, 2019 – June 2, 2023
- Volumes: 5

I Think Our Son Is Gay (Japanese: うちの息子はたぶんゲイ, Hepburn: Uchi no Musuko wa Tabun Gei; lit. 'Our Son Is Probably Gay') is a Japanese manga series written and illustrated by Okura. The series was initially serialized on Twitter from November 2018 to December 2022. It was serialized on the Gangan Pixiv website from August 2019 to June 2023. Its chapters have been collected in five tankōbon volumes.

== Plot ==
The manga follows Tomoko Aoyama and her eldest son, Hiroki. Hiroki is secretly gay, but is embarrassed to reveal his sexuality, unaware that his own mother already knows it. While Tomoko has accepted her son and supports him, she refuses to out her son as she wants Hiroki himself to admit his sexuality by his own accord. Other supporting characters including Yuri, Tomoko's younger son and Hiroki's brother, who despite having no interest in romance, has attracted the attention of many girls and is also aware of his brother's sexuality; Akiyoshi, Tomoko's husband and the boys' father, who is constantly traveling for work and loves his sons but sometimes unintentionally hurts Hiroki's feelings due to his negative and outdated views on homosexuality; Daigo, Hiroki's classmate and his secret crush; and Asumi, Hiroki's childhood friend who develops feelings for Hiroki, but is unaware of his sexuality.

== Publication ==
The series is written and illustrated by Okura. It was initially serialized on Twitter from November 2018 to December 2022. It started serialization on the Gangan Pixiv service on August 16, 2019, with more chapters added between the original ones. Its serialization completed on Gangan Pixiv on June 2, 2023. Square Enix collected its chapters into five tankōbon volumes, released from August 22, 2019, to February 21, 2023.

In July 2020, Square Enix announced they would also be publishing the series in English.

=== Volume list ===
No.	Original release date	Original ISBN	English release date	English ISBN
1	August 22, 2019	978-4-75-756233-2	May 11, 2021	978-1-64-609092-1
2	March 21, 2020	978-4-75-756585-2	November 23, 2021	978-1-64-609112-6
3	November 21, 2020	978-4-75-756943-0	July 18, 2022	978-1-64-609126-3
4	November 22, 2021	978-4-75-757580-6	November 8, 2022	978-1-64-609162-1
5	February 21, 2023	978-4-75-758413-6	February 20, 2024	978-1-64-609257-4

== Reception ==
Ash Brown of Manga Bookshelf praised the first volume, calling it an "absolute delight". Danica Davidson of Otaku USA also praised the first volume, calling it "endearing". Lynzee Loveridge of Anime News Network rated the first volume an A, praising the characters, plot, and artwork. Sarah of Anime UK News also praised the first volume, stating it "delivers an entertaining and feel-good read". Like previous critics, Takato of Manga News also praised both the plot and artwork.
