= Manga Up! =

Japanese manga service

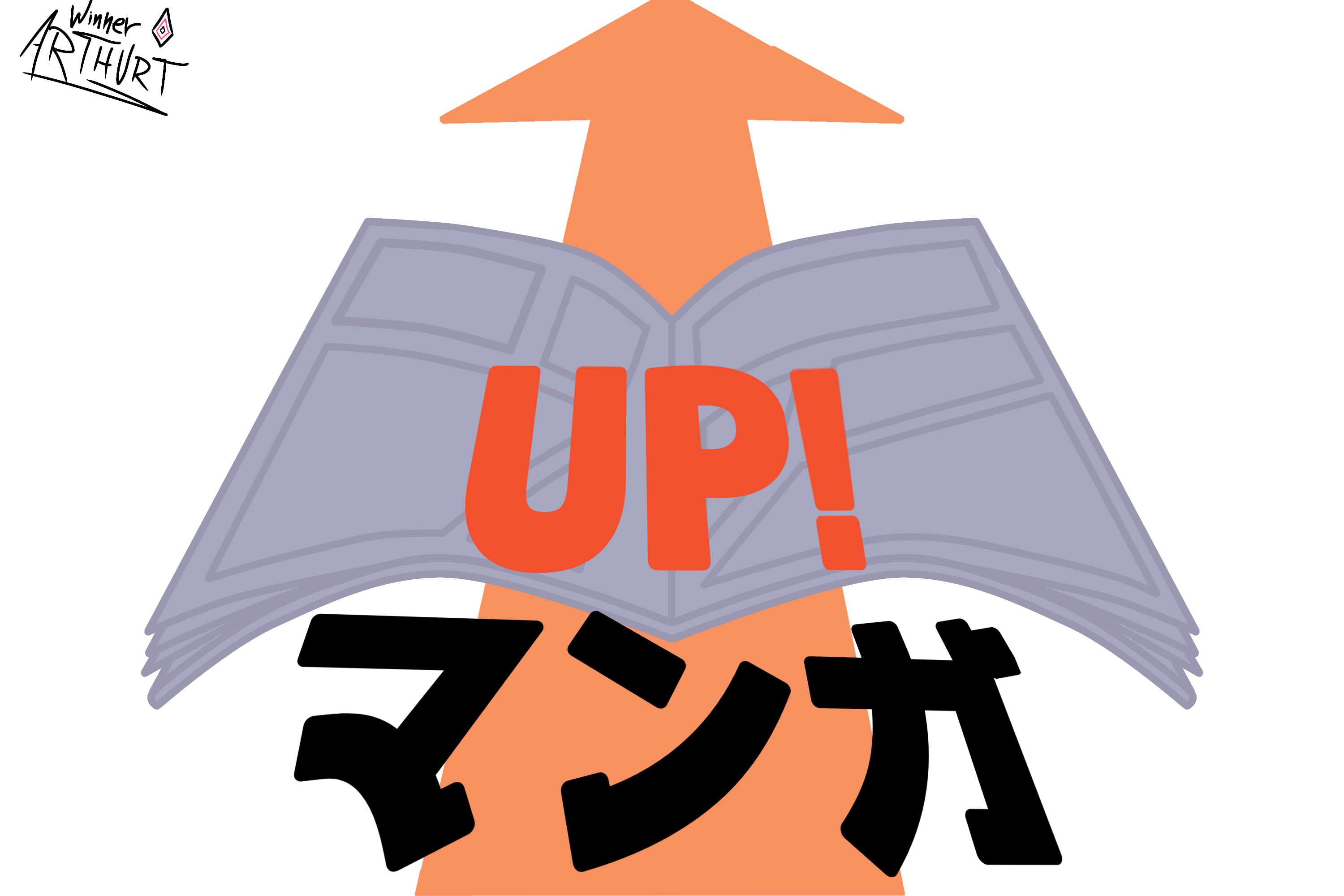
- Fan art of the online manga (Manga Up!)
- Website type: Digital manga
- Available in: Japanese, English
- Owner: Square Enix
- Website: www.manga-up.com global.manga-up.com
- Commercial: Yes
- Registration: Optional
- Launched: January 7, 2017
- Current status: Active

Manga Up! (マンガUP!) is a Japanese manga service. Originally launched in January 2017, the service hosts manga series published by Square Enix. The service also serializes original works, many of which are derived from other media. In July 2022, the website launched internationally in English.

== History ==
The service originally launched in Japan on January 7, 2017, with an Android and iOS app and website.

An English-language version of the service was launched on July 25, 2022. It featured mostly titles published by Square Enix's manga publishing division, along with series from other publishers that were published by Square Enix in Japan and series that had not been published in English at the time.

== Serializations ==
In addition to previously published works, the service also serializes works. Many of these works are adaptations of other media, such as video games, multimedia franchises, and light novels.

=== Manga Up! Global titles ===
- 100 Things the Sheltered Lady and This Commoner Want to Do
- 25 Years in a Dungeon: A Suspicious Man Returns as a Dungeon Streamer!
- 404 Demons
- The 6-Year-Old Sage Wants to Hide in the Shadows
- The 6th Loop: I'm Finally Free of Auto Mode in this Otome Game
- The Abandoned Tamer Signs a Deal With a Devilishly Beautiful Dragon
- ACCA: 13-Territory Inspection Dept.
- After Getting the Crap Skill "Poison Immunity," I Ate the Toxic Meat of a Dead SSS-Rank Monster and Awakened an OP Ability
- The After-School Bullying Trial is Now in Session!
- AGERECO! Getting Into the Voice Acting Spirit!
- Aizawa-san Multiplies
- Akame ga Kill!
  - Akame ga Kill! Zero
  - Hinowa ga Crush!
- The Alexis Empire Chronicle
- Always a Catch!
- Always Second but Actually Invincible
- The Amazing Village Creator: Slow Living with the Village Building Cheat Skill
- The Angel Next Door Spoils Me Rotten
  - The Angel Next Door Spoils Me Rotten: After the Rain
- Anything's Possible with Ultimate Alchemy
- Aoharu × Machinegun
- Aoi-kun Wants This Muscular Girl to Flex!
- Aphorism
- The Apothecary Diaries
  - The Apothecary Diaries: Xiaolan's Story
- Arachnid
- Arakawa Under the Bridge
- Are You Okay with a Slightly Older Girlfriend?
- As Miss Beelzebub Likes
- Asahina Wakaba & Her Chubby-Chubby Boyfriend
- Assassin & Cinderella
- Assistant Teacher at a Girls Magic Academy
- At Home with a Girl in Her Cute Pajamas
- B. Ichi
- The B-Class Mage of Unrivaled Speed
- Backyard Junk Universe
- The Banished Saint's Pilgrimage: From Dying to Thriving
- Barakamon
- The Baron's Daughter's Childish Transformation: An Envious Princess's Curse and the Platinum Knight's Proposal?!
- The Beast King Ouma Reconquers the World
- Beast Tamer
- Beauty and the Feast
- Betrothed to a Fox Demon
- Bitter Knight in My Sweet Café
- Birdcage Castle
- Black Butler
- The Black Witch Runs Her Own Boarding House in Another World
- Blast of Tempest
- Bloody Cross
- Blue Archive: The Grand Adventure of the Game Development Department
- Born with the Weakest Job, I Worked My Hardest to Become the Strongest Tamer with the Weakest Skill: Fist Punch!
- Bottom-tier Character Tomozaki
- The Bound Hero Knows No Fear
- Boyish Girlfriend
- Bride of the Death God
- By the Grace of the Gods
- Can't Stop Cursing You
- The Carefree Journey of the Reincarnated Hero
- The Case Study of Vanitas
- Cast-off Magic Tool Researcher is Actually an S-rank Mage
- Caterpillar
- Celebrity Family's Ex-Backstage Son Wants a Normal Youth
- A Certain Magical Index
- Charlotte: The Tale of a Castle Maid
- Cheat Mode Farming in Another World
- Cherry Magic! Thirty Years of Virginity Can Make You a Wizard?!
- Chitose Is in the Ramune Bottle
- Chiyo Kuno the Psychic
- Code of Misconduct
- The Commander Sorcerer's Contract Marriage
- Corpse Party: Blood Covered
- The Corrupt Guildmaster Is Beloved by the Banished
- The Crafty Mage: Frontier Settling Made Easy
- Crimson Prince
- The Cruel King I'm Marrying as a Substitute Bride Is My First Love?!
- Cuticle Detective Inaba
- The Cynical Knight and Gentle Princess: Building Fairy Homes and a Life Together
- Daemons of the Shadow Realm
- The Daily Life of a Middle-Aged Online Shopper in Another World
- Daily Lives of High School Boys
- A Dating Sim of Life or Death
- Daughter of the Dragon God
- The Days After the Hero's Return
- Dead Mount Death Play
  - Dead Mount Death Play: Phantom Solitaire's Supernatural Impersonation
- A Defeated Saint's Gonna Topple a Kingdom!
- A Delinquent's Life Hacks
- Demon and Song
- Demoted to a Teacher, the Strongest Sage Raises an Unbeatable Class
- The Dependable Delinquents' Daily Lives
- The Diary of a Middle-Aged Teacher's Carefree Life in Another World
- Died a Slave, Reborn a Noble: Becoming the Strongest With a Daughter Who's Older Than Me
- Dimension W
- Do It Yourself!!
- Do You Like Baby-faced Bosses?
- Don't Pry Into People's Genders in Online Games!
- Donyatsu
- Doubt
- Dragon and Chameleon
- Dragon and Flower: The Timid Princess and the Ice Sword's Loyalty
- Dragon Quest: The Mark of Erdrick
- The Dragon's Sacrificial Bride: A Cursed Girl Beloved as a Soulmate
- Drawn to My Bad-Boy Assistant
- Drunken D-Rank Pulls Out the Legendary Sword
- Dualing Fighters
- The Duke's Daughter Drops Her Engagement and Facade
- The Duke's Daughter Tiaresia Takes Revenge
- Dungeon Farm: Kicked Out of My Home, So I'm Homesteading in a Dungeon!
- Durarara!!
- Dusk Maiden of Amnesia
- Eighteen
- The Elf and the Hunter's Item Atelier
- The Emperor's Caretaker: I'm Too Happy Living as a Lady-in-Waiting to Leave the Palace
- Emperor's Mark to Rule the Monsters: Reborn Sage to Strongest Adventurer
- The Emperor's Shaman
- Escape from the Seventh Night
- Escaping Overwork Via My Stalker
- Even Monsters Like Fairytales
- Even the Elf Captain Wants to be a Maiden
- The Evil Princess Will Kill No More
- The Ex-Villainess's Unsightly Daughter: A Beady-Eyed Commoner's Journey to the Top
- The Executed Sage Who Was Reincarnated as a Lich Started an All-Out War
- The Executioner and Her Way of Life
- Exquisite Blood: The Heretic Onmyoji
- Fake It to Break It! I Faked Amnesia to Break off My Engagement and Now He's All Lovey-Dovey?!
- Falling for Her Secret Side
- False Child
- Fantasy Gourmet
- Fenrir
- Final Boss Fake-out: The Protagonist Thinks She Killed Me So Now I'm Free!
- Final Fantasy Lost Stranger
- Final Fantasy XIV: Eorzea Academy
- The Free Life of the Forlorn Lady: Shining On as a Gem Appraiser After Getting Dumped
- From Betrayed Hero to Invincible Demon King
- From Old Country Bumpkin to Master Swordsman: The Mage Knight's Origin
  - From Old Country Bumpkin to Master Swordsman: The Twin Dragonblade's Journey to the Top
- From Leveling Up the Hero to Leveling Up a Nation
- From Overshadowed to Overpowered: Second Reincarnation of a Talentless Sage
- From Superfan to Stepsister
- From the Red Fog
- Frontier Life with a Weird Dragon and an Errand Boy
- Fullmetal Alchemist
- The Gender of Mona Lisa
- The Genius Prince's Guide to Raising a Nation Out of Debt
- The Girl I Like Forgot Her Glasses
- The Girl I Saved on the Train Turned Out to Be My Childhood Friend
- Girl Meets Dragon: The Sacrificial Maiden's Happily Ever After
- Goblin Slayer
  - Goblin Slayer Side Story: Year One
  - Goblin Slayer Side Story II: Dai Katana
  - Goblin Slayer: Brand New Day
  - Goblin Slayer: A Day in the Life
- The God-Slaying Demon King: Reincarnated as a Mere Mortal to Become the Strongest in History!
- Goinda's Naughty Secret
- The Good Deeds of Old Adventurer Kane
- Goodbye, Eden
- The Great Jahy Will Not Be Defeated!
- The Greatest Demon Lord Is Reborn as a Typical Nobody
- The Greatest Magicmaster's Retirement Plan – The Alternative -
- The Grim Reaper and an Argent Cavalier
- Grimgar of Fantasy and Ash
- Gugure! Kokkuri-san
- Haimiya Is Scary Cute
- Happy Sugar Life
- Have a Great Trip After the End Credits
- The Healer Consort
- Hebigami Transforms When He's Cold
- A Herbivorous Dragon of 5,000 Years Gets Unfairly Villainized
- The Hero and the Sage, Reincarnated and Engaged
- Hero Classroom
- High School Prodigies Have It Easy Even in Another World
- The Holy Grail of Eris
- Homeland Dropout: The Time I Was Reincarnated as the Fourth Enchanter in the Entire World
- Horimiya
- How a Country Girl Reincarnated as a Villainess Tries to Avoid a Bad Ending: I Don't Want to Die So I Need to Become Stronger than the Final Boss
- How a Single Gold Coin Can Change an Adventurer's Life
- How Four Negative Skills = Unrivaled Synergy
- How I Attended an All-Guy's Mixer
- How to Feed a Delinquent Boy
- How to Survive a Thousand Deaths: Accidentally Wooing Everyone as an Ex-gamer Made Villainess!
- A Howl of the Heart
- I Became a Legend after My 10 Year-Long Last Stand
- I Became a Saint to Support My Idol!
- I Can Go Adventuring by Myself, Mom!: The Son Raised by the Strongest Overprotective Dragon-Mom
- I Can't a Choose a Childhood Friend
- I Got Pregnant With His Majesty's Child -A Biography of Queen Berta-
- I Got Reincarnated as a Son of Innkeepers!
- I Grew the Greatest Home Garden with my OP Cultivation Skill?
- I Lost My Adventurer's License, but It's Fine Because I Have an Adorable Daughter Now
- I Need to Quit this Antique Store
- I Think I'll Cheat to Become a Spellsword in Another World
- I Think Our Son Is Gay
- I Time-Traveled and Confessed to My Teacher Crush
- I Was Called Inept at Home, but Turns Out I'm Super Adept Compared to the Rest of the World
- I Was Sacrificed to a Vampire, But He Spoils Me Instead!
- I Was Summoned to Be a Saint, but Was Robbed of the Position
- I... Don't Want to Work Anymore. I Quit Being an Adventurer For Good and You Can't Stop Me.
- I'll Become an Elegant Villainess!
- I'm a Maid, but I've Pulled Out the Holy Sword?!
- I'm an Alchemist Who Doesn't Know How OP I Am
- I'm Glad They Kicked Me From The Hero's Party... But Why're you following me, Great Saintess?
- I'm Happily Married to a Lord with the Worst Reputation
- I'm No Hero in the Shadows!
- I'm Not Even an NPC In This Otome Game!
- I'm Now the Princess of Spring in Another World
- I'm the Catlords' Manservant
- I'm the Only Monster Tamer in the World and Was Mistaken for the Demon Lord
- I've Been Killing Slimes for 300 Years and Maxed Out My Level
  - I Was a Bottom-Tier Bureaucrat for 1,500 Years, and the Demon King Made Me a Minister
  - Red Dragon Women Academy
- Ibitsu
- The Ice Guy and His Cool Female Colleague
- The Ice Mage's Unrequited Love was Me in Disguise
- If Witch, Then Which?
- Im: Great Priest Imhotep
- Immoral Guild
- The Imperial Court's Floral Stylist
- The Impregnable Demon King's Castle and the Expelled Black Mage of the Hero's Party
- In Her Fifth Life, the Villainess Lives With the Evil Dragon -The Evil Dragon of Ruin Wants to Spoil His Bride-
- Inu × Boku SS
- Inuta: My Canine Classmate
- Is It My Fault That I Got Bullied?
- Is It Wrong to Try to Pick Up Girls in a Dungeon?
  - Is It Wrong to Try to Pick Up Girls in a Dungeon? Familia Chronicle Episode Lyu
  - Is It Wrong to Try to Pick Up Girls in a Dungeon? Four-Panel Comic: Days of Goddess
  - Is It Wrong to Try to Pick Up Girls in a Dungeon? Four-Panel Comic: Odd Days of Goddess
  - Is It Wrong to Try to Pick Up Girls in a Dungeon? II
  - Is It Wrong to Try to Pick Up Girls in a Dungeon? On the Side: Sword Oratoria
- The Isekai Returnee is Too OP for the Modern World
- It's Not Easy Being Cute
- Jackpot Sisters
- The Journey of the Half-Elf Dwarven Master Blacksmith
- Judge
- Kakegurui
  - Kakegurui Twin
- KasuRich
- Kijima-san & Yamada-san
- Killer Alchemist -Assassinations in Another World-
- Killer's Familia
- Killing My Sensei Softly
- The Kind Adventurer and the Reincarnated Girl
- Knight's & Magic
- Kuzumi-kun, Can't You Read the Room?
- La La La
- The Lady Likes a Nerd over Princes
- Learning to Love My Cat-like Classmate
- The Legendary Dragon-armored Knight Wants to Live a Normal Life In the Countryside
- The Lesser Irregular Returns From the Demon World
- Let Me Be Single in Peace!
- Level 0 Demon King Becomes an Adventurer in Another World
- Lily of the High Seas
- Living a Laid-Back Second Life on the Island of the Strongest Species
- Living With My Brother's Wife
- Local Farmer Kills Dragon, Outs Himself as The Strongest in the Land!
- Lockdown Life with the Class Beauty
- Lofty Flower, fall for me!!
- The Lonely King and His Sunshine Bride's Happily Ever After
- Love in the Palm of His Hand
- Love Unseen Beneath the Clear Night Sky
- Love's Just an Act
- The Magic Swordsmith
- The Magical Girl and The Evil Lieutenant Used to Be Archenemies
- Magical Girl Recruiter Puicho!
- Magical Girl Spec-Ops Asuka
- The Maid I Admire Looks Good with a Cigarette
- The Maid I Hired Recently Is Mysterious
- Making Magic: The Sweet Life of a Witch Who Knows an Infinite MP Loophole
- A Man and His Cat
- The Marriage of the Unseen Duke
- The Marquis and His Second Wife's Idea of a Peaceful Family Dinner Table
- Mechanical Buddy Universe
  - Mechanical Buddy Universe 1.0
- The Mercenary and the Novelist
- Miss Shachiku and the Little Baby Ghost
- Mobsters in Love
- Moimon
- Monster Eater
- Monthly Girls' Nozaki-kun
- The Morose Mononokean
- Mr. Villain's Day Off
- Mushoku Tensei: Jobless Reincarnation ~Eris Sharpens Her Fangs~
- My Adventurer Life: I Became the Strongest Magic-Refining Sage in a New World
- My Awkward Senpai
- My Blade Will Lead the Way! Abandoned in a Labyrinth as a Directionally Challenged S-Rank Swordsman
- My Boss Only Gets Flustered Around Me
- My Classmate James
- My Clueless First Friend
- My Dear, Curse-Casting Vampiress
- My Dress-Up Darling
  - My Dress-Up Darling XOXO
- My Ex-Boyfriend Loves Boys' Love!
- My Faceless Classmate, Wakao
- My Favorite VTuber Is Scary IRL
- My First Times with Suwa-san
- My Friend's Little Sister Has It In for Me!
- My Happy Marriage
- My Housemate Sano-kun Is Just My Editor!
- My Isekai Life
- My Magical Career at Court: Living the Dream After My Nightmare Boss Fired Me from the Mages' Guild!
- My Not-So-Fair Lady is Doomed! (But Not If I Can Help It)
- My Pampering Turned the Cool Goddess Into a Clumsy Spoiled Girl
- My Poison Princess Is Still Cute
- My Return to the Imperial Harem: The Tale of Snow White Sow
- My Shady Little Brother, Gyomei
- My Spooky Storyteller Is an Adorable Klutz
- My Unexpected Marriage
- A Mysterious Job Called Oda Nobunaga
- The Necromancer Maid
- The Newbie Princess Doesn't Want a Game Over! Survive Through the Power of Simping
- Nia Liston: The Merciless Maiden
- Nina Is Plotting Daddy's Death
- No Matter How I Look at It, It's You Guys' Fault I'm Not Popular!
- Noble Reincarnation: Born Blessed, So I'll Obtain Ultimate Power
  - Noble Reincarnation: Side Story: 14-year-old Noa's Unparalleled Journey
- The Noble Unlocker's Ascendancy
- Not Quite Love
- Notorious No More: The Villainess Enjoys Feigning Incompetence
- On and Off: Work-Life Imbalance
- One Room of Happiness
- One Week Friends
- Only My Undesirable Translation Talent Can Change the World
- Otaku × Gal
- The Otaku Love Connection
- Otherside Picnic
- Overpowered and Underpaid: An OP Swordmaster Turns Hit Streamer
- Pandora Hearts
- Paranormal Agent Adashino
- The Perfect Cross-Dressing Couple
- The Perks of Working in the Black Magic Industry
- Play It Cool, Guys
- Please Put Them On, Takamine-san
- Porter of Heroes
- The Prince's Keeper: The Cursed Prince is Too Fluffy to Resist!
- The Princess Groom
- Princess of Desert Rain: Once a Mage, Now a Farmer's Daughter
- Programmed for Heartbreak: Sartain in Love
- Proud to Be the Villainess: I'm Doomed After Stealing my Half-Sister's Fiancé and Having Her Banished
- The Quest for the Luxury Liner: Seize the Rich Life with a Ship-Summoning Skill in Another World
- Ragna Crimson
- The Re-Reincarnated Boy Lives Peacefully as an S-Rank Adventurer ~ I, a Sage and Hero in My Previous Lives, Will Live a Simple Life in My Next ~
- Re:Zero – Starting Life in Another World, Chapter 2: One Week at the Mansion
  - Re:Zero – Starting Life in Another World, The Frozen Bond
- Reading Our Way to a Happy New World
- Reborn as a Feudal Lord Gathering a Talented Elite So This Land Can Thrive by Employing My Past Life Experiences as an Overworked White-Collar Worker
- The Record of a Fallen Vampire
- The Red Ranger Becomes an Adventurer in Another World
- Reincarnated as a 15-Year-Old Queen: I'm an Ex-office Worker, but the Young King Is Interested in Me?!
- Reincarnated as an Eight-Year-Old Apostle of the Gods
- Reincarnated as the Daughter of the Legendary Hero and the Queen of Spirits
- The Reincarnated Prince Becomes an Alchemist and Brings Prosperity to His Country
- Reincarnation of the Unrivalled Time Mage: The Underachiever at the Magic Academy Turns Out to Be the Strongest Mage Who Controls Time!
- Repeated Vice: I Refuse to Be Important Enough to Die
- Restaurant to Another World
- Reto the Protector
- Revolutionary Restart for The Blue Rose Princess
- Rokurei: The Anti-Exorcism Division
- Rooming with a Gamer Gal
- The Royal Tutor
- Ruby on the Cake: Feast of the Man-Eating Witches
- Rust-Eater Bisco
  - Rust-Eater Bisco 2
- The Sacrificial Witch and the Lovelorn King
- The Saint's Modern Recipes for Survival: Cooking to Avoid Death by My Husband's Fans!
- The Saintess Recruited a Doting King Husband
- Saki
  - Saki & Final Fantasy XIV
- School Submarine Fleet: MERMAID GIRLS
- Schoolteacher to Swordmaster
- Scum's Wish
- The Secret of my Brother's Friend
- See Only Me Me Me Me Me..
- Sekirei
- She's Drop Dead Drunk
- Shibuya Goldfish
- Shut Up, Takamori!
- Since I Was Confessed To, Milady Has Been Acting Strange
- Slasher Maidens
- Smoking Behind the Supermarket with You
- Soul Eater
  - Soul Eater Not!
- Spiral: The Bonds of Reasoning
- The Spirits I Saved Adore Me in This Life Too
- Stalker Stalks Stalker
- A Starlit Darkness
- Strawberry Love
- The Strongest Hero: Envoy of Darkness -Betrayed by His Comrades, the Strongest Hero Joins Forces with the Strongest Monster-
- The Strongest Middle-Aged Hunter Goes to Another World: This Time, He Wants to Have a Simple Life
- The Strongest Sage with the Weakest Crest
  - The Strongest Sage: The Story of a Talentless Man Who Mastered Magic and Became the Best
- The Strongest Swordsman Has Zero Equipment Slots, but He Can Equip up to 9999 Items if It's (Cute) Cursed Equipment
- Strongest Swordsman's Magic Training: Reincarnated with Level 99 Stats, He Gets to Start Over from Level 1
- The Strongest Tank's Labyrinth Raids -A Tank with a Rare 9999 Resistance Skill Got Kicked from the Hero's Party-
- The Strongest Wizard Becomes a Countryside Guard After Taking an Arrow to the Knee
- The Strongest Wizard Making Full Use of the Strategy Guide -No Taking Orders, I'll Slay the Demon King My Own Way-
- Studio Apartment, Good Lighting, Angel Included
- Suicide Notes Laid on the Table
- Sukedachi Nine
- Sunbeams in the Sky
- Supervillain Boy
- Suppose a Kid from the Last Dungeon Boonies Moved to a Starter Town
- Sweet & Tart Boyfriend
- The Swordsman Dubbed the Sorcerer of Countless Swords
- Takahashi-san Is listening
- Talentless Nana
- Tales of Reincarnation in Maydare: This World's Worst Witch
- Tales of Wedding Rings
- Tanaka-kun Is Always Listless
- Teacher, We Will Destroy the World!
- A Terrified Teacher at Ghoul School!
  - A New Student at Ghoul School!
- The Teen Web Novelist is a Girl Magnet: Now My Crush Feels Bad for Rejecting Me!
- That Inferior Knight, Level 999
- That Second-Rate Warrior Is Now an Overpowered Mage!
- Today's Cerberus
- Toilet-bound Hanako-kun
  - After-school Hanako-kun
- Tokyo Aliens
- Trained to be the Ultimate Anti-magic Spellblade
- Transmigrated to the Northern Frontier
- Trapped as the Villain in My Favorite Dating SIM: But I Know How to Win over All the Heroines!
- Trinity of the Royal Palace
- Trying Out Alchemy After Being Fired as an Adventurer!: Frontier Settling? No Problem, Leave It to Me!
- Tsukimi Is All Dolled Up
- Übel Blatt
  - Übel Blatt II
- Uglymug, Epicfighter
  - Uglymug, Epicfighter SSS
- Underdog Idol
- The Unholy Paladin
- The Unrivaled Reincarnated Sage of Another World -The Strongest in Another World Through Game Knowledge-
- Unwinding with the Aloof Girl at the Standing Bar
- Val × Love
- VAMPXIA
- Venus in December
- Vermeil in Gold: The Failing Student and the Strongest Scourge Plunge Into the World of Magic
- The Vexations of a Shut-In Vampire Princess
- Victoria's Electric Coffin
- The Villainess Stans the Heroes
- The Villainess' Butler: Death Flag Destroyer at Your Service
- The Villainess's Guide to (Not) Falling in Love
- The Viscount's Porky Portrait: I Married the Knight My Sister Rejected
- VTuber Shigemi Kusamura: I'm My Oshi's Favorite
- Wandering Witch: The Journey of Elaina
- Wash It All Away
- We Are All D***
- Welcome to the Yandere Cafe
- When a Magician's Pupil Smiles
- When I Tried Strengthening a Rusty Sword, It Turned into an OP Magic Sword
- Why She Loves Scum
- Wildcard Alchemist: Building the Ultimate Guild With a Divine Fluffy Beast and Random Alchemy Skill
- Witch Life in a Micro Room
- The Witch of Dawn
- The Witch's Servant and the Demon Lord's Horns
- Working seems Pointless After the Hero Labeled Me as a Coward and Kicked Me From His Party
- The World is Full of Monsters, So I Want to Live as I Wish
- Wrapping up the Imperial Harem
- Yang Can't Live Alone
- YanOta: The Delinquent and the Otaku
- YoRHa – Pearl Harbor Descent Record – A NieR:Automata Story
- Yoshi no Zuikara
- You Were Experienced, I Was Not: Our Dating Story
- Your Castle's Little Helper
- Yuko, the Ghost in My Room

== Reception ==
Japanese website Appmedia praised the works and free content of the app. The app was nominated for the 2017 Google Play Awards in Japan. The app has 20 million downloads as of November 2022.

=== Global ===
Upon the service's international release, many users criticized its censorship. In particular, some critics pointed out that the censorship included knees and elbows. Jason Faulkner from GameRevolution also noted that risqué series like My Dress-Up Darling had characters that were mostly obscured. He also felt the censorship was likely done by a machine.

Criticism was also directed at the service's monetization model. Isaiah Colbert of Kotaku unfavorably compared the monetization to microtransactions in video games. Faulkner described the monetization as "nonsensical" and criticized the pricing as overly expensive.

On July 27, 2022, Manga Up! issued a response to the censorship complaints. The response cited censorship policies in non-English countries like Indonesia as the reasoning for the censorship. On September 4, 2022, Square Enix announced that all the censorship via black bars had been removed and replaced with less-intrusive censorship methods.
