= List of Is It Wrong to Try to Pick Up Girls in a Dungeon? chapters =

The manga series Is It Wrong to Try to Pick Up Girls in a Dungeon? is written by Fujino Ōmori and illustrated by Kunieda. The manga is an adaptation of Fujino Ōmori's Is It Wrong to Try to Pick Up Girls in a Dungeon? light novel series published by Square Enix. The series started serialization in Square Enix's seinen manga magazine Young Gangan from August 2, 2013. It has been collected in ten tankōbon volumes. Yen Press announced at their New York Comic Con 2014 panel the rights to publish the manga in North America.

A four-panel manga series titled Dungeon ni Deai o Motomeru no wa Machigatteiru Darō ka 4-koma: Kamisama no Nichijō (ダンジョンに出会いを求めるのは間違っているだろうか4コマ【神様の日常】) by Masaya Takamura began serialization in Square Enix's online manga magazine Gangan Online from August 14, 2014.

A manga series titled Dungeon ni Deai o Motomeru no wa Machigatteiru Darō ka: ～Memoria Freese～ Seiya no Musō Uta (ダンジョンに出会いを求めるのは間違っているだろうか ～メモリア・フレーゼ～ 聖夜の夢想歌) by Yu Shiomura began serialization in Square Enix's online manga app Manga UP! from December 25, 2021.

== Volume list ==
=== Is It Wrong to Try to Pick Up Girls in a Dungeon? ===
A manga adaptation with art by Kunieda began serialization in Square Enix's seinen manga magazine Young Gangan from August 2, 2013. It has been collected in ten tankōbon volumes. Yen Press announced at their New York Comic Con 2014 panel the rights to publish the manga in North America.

No.	Original release date	Original ISBN	English release date	English ISBN
1	December 13, 2013	978-4-7575-4166-5	May 19, 2015	978-0-316-30217-3
1. "World, Reality, and Desire" (世界と現実と憧憬, "Sekai to Genjitsu to Dōkei"); 2. "That's why I Run" (だから僕は走る, "Dakara Boku wa Hashiru"); 3. "Night Before Awakening" (覚醒前夜, "Kakusei Zen'ya"); 4. "That's why I Want to Help" (だから僕は力になりたい, "Dakara Boku wa Chikara ni Naritai"); 5. "The Goddess's Prank" (女柚のいたずら, "On'na Yuzu no Itazura"); 6. "Monsterphilia Begins" (怪物祭(モンスターフィリア)開幕, "Monsutā Firia Kaimaku"); 7. "The fair, the Date, the Search" (祭りとデー卜と人捜し, "Matsuri to Dētā to Hito Sagashi")
2	May 14, 2014	978-4-7575-4304-1	August 18, 2015	978-0-316-34591-0
8. "The Goddess's Favor" (女神の寵愛, "Megami no Choai"); 9. "The Courage it Takes" (ありつたけの男気, "Aritsu Take no Otokogi"); 10. "Family" (家旅, "Tatabi"); 11. "The Divine Knife" (神様のナイフ, "Kamisama no Naifu"); 12. "Bump of Chicken" (パンプ.オブ.チキン, "Panpu. Obu. Chikin"); 13. "Roar" (雄たけび, "Otakebi"); 14. "A Chance Meeting" (出会い, "Deai")
3	November 13, 2014	978-4-7575-4464-2	November 17, 2015	978-0-316-35207-9
15. "A Shopping Mishap??" (お買い物は災いのもと??, "O Kaimono wa Wazawai no Moto??"); 16. "The Supporter's Situation" (サポーターのお仕事事情, "Sapōtā no Oshigoto Jijō"); 17. "A Thief's Dungeon Trap" (迷宮に潜む罠?, "Meikyū ni Hisomu Wana?"); 18. "Fiasco and Miscalculation" (大失態と大誤算, "Dai Shittai to Dai Gosan"); 19. "A Big Misunderstanding!?" (大いなる勘違い!?, "Ōinaru Kanchigai!?"); 20. "Jealousy, Joy, and a Bath??" (嫉妬と歓喜と入浴??, "Shitto to Kanki to Nyūyoku?"); 21. "Calm Before the Storm!?" (嵐の前の静けさ!?, "Arashi no Mae no Shizukesa!?"); 22. "Reckless!?" (油断大敵!?, "Yudantaiteki!?")
4	March 25, 2015	978-4-7575-4592-2	February 23, 2016	978-0-316-27000-7
23. "Manifestation" (発現, "Hatsugen"); 24. "Magic Summons That?" (魔法はアレを喚ぶ?, "Mahō wa Are o Yobu?"); 25. "Divine Wine" (神洒, "Kami Sake"); 26. "Level 10" (10階層, "10 Kaisō"); 27. "Betrayal?" (裏切り?, "Uragiri?"); 28. "Death" (死, "Shi"); 29. "Trust" (信頼, "Shinrai"); 30. "Restart" (リスタート, "Risutotā")
5	June 25, 2015	978-4-7575-4673-8	May 24, 2016	978-0-316-27225-4
31. "The Boy and the Sword Princess" (少年と剣姫, "Shōnen to Kenki"); 32. "Training with the Sword Princess" (剣姫の特訓, "Kenki no Tokkun"); 33. "The Scheme Commences" (策謀の始まり, "Sakubō no Hajimari"); 34. "Party Play" (パーティプレイ, "Pātīpurei"); 35. "Surging Crusade" (聖戦勃発, "Seisen Boppatsu"); 36. "Assault" (強襲, "Kyōshū"); 37. "To New Heights" (高みへ, "Takami e")
6	March 25, 2016	978-4-7575-4925-8	November 22, 2016	978-0-316-55260-8
38. "Fear" (恐怖, "Kyōfu"); 39. "A Premonition?" (虫の知らせ??, "Mushi no Shirase?"); 40. "Affinity" (因縁, "In'nen"); 41. "The Making of a Hero" (英雄たるもの, "Eiyūtaru Mono"); 42. "The Brink of Despair" (絶望の果て, "Zetsubō no Hate"); 43. "Awakening" (覚醒, "Kakusei"); 44. "Argonaut" (英雄願望(アルゴノゥト), "Arugonoto"); 45. "Resolution" (決着, "Ketchaku"); 46. "Adventurers" (冒険者, "Bōken-sha"); 47. "The Secret Connection Between Leveling Up and a Conference of Deities" (ランクアップと神会の密接な関係, "Ranku Appu to Kami-kai no Missetsuna Kankei")
7	October 13, 2016	978-4-7575-5120-6	July 18, 2017	978-0-316-43978-7
48. "The Deities Convene" (神会(デナトゥス)開幕, "Denatusu Kaimaku"); 49. "Primed for a New Encounter" (出会いの呼び水, "Deai no Yobimizu"); 50. "Deeper Connections" (加わる関係, "Kuwawaru Kankei"); 51. "Benefits of Leveling Up" (レベルアップの恩恵, "Reberuappu no Onkei"); 52. "The Smith's Skills" (鍛冶師の腕前, "Tan'ya-shi no Udemae"); 53. "Ignition" (発動, "Hatsudō"); 54. "Truth" (真実, "Shinjitsu"); 55. "Fiery Passion" (熱き想い, "Atsuki Omoi"); 56. "A New Conquest" (新たな進撃, "Aratana Shingeki"); 57. "Signs of Things to Come" (予兆の前触れ, "Yochō no Maebure")
8	March 23, 2017	978-4-7575-5287-6	November 14, 2017	978-0-316-41190-5
58. "Foreboding Entanglements" (縺れの予感, "Motsure no Yokan"); 59. "Pass Parade" (怪物進呈(パス・パレード), "Pasu Parēdo"); 60. "Suggestion and Decision" (決断と提案, "Ketsudan to Teian"); 61. "The God's Decision" (神々の決断, "Kamigami no Ketsudan"); 62. "Gale Wind Returns" (疾風参戦, "Hayate Sansen"); 63. "Departure" (出立の刻, "Shuttatsu no Koku"); 64. "Another Confrontation" (再びの対峙, "Futatabi no Taiji"); 65. "Hero's Wild Dance" (英雄乱舞, "Eiyū Ranbu"); 66. "A New Conquest" (決死, "Kesshi"); 67. "Arrival" (たどり着いた場, "Tadoritsuita Ba")
9	September 25, 2017	978-4-7575-5368-2	May 22, 2018	978-1-9753-2651-7
68. "Miraculous Encounter" (奇跡の対面, "Kiseki no Taimen"); 69. "Relationship Difficulties" (修羅場, "Shuraba"); 70. "The Incident Happened Like This" (事件はこうして起こった, "Jiken ha Kōshite Okotta"); 71. "The Incident Developed into Trouble" (事件は難儀な展開に, "Jiken ha Nangi na Tenkai ni"); 72. "Past and Present" (過去と現在, "Kako to Genzai"); 73. "A Sudden Incident" (突然の出来事, "Totsuzen no Dekigoto"); 74. "Tested Resolve" (試される決意, "Tamesareru Ketsui"); 75. "Outbreak" (開戦, "Kaisen"); 76. "Omen" (兆し, "Kizashi"); 77. "Divinity" (神威, "Shini")
10	June 25, 2018	978-4-7575-5763-5	January 22, 2019	978-1-9753-8358-9
78. "An Unprecedented Disaster" (未曾有の惨事, "Mizou no Sanji"); 79. "All-out Attack" (総攻撃, "Sōkōgeki"); 80. "Resuscitation" (起死回生, "Kishi Kaisei"); 81. "An Attack With All of One's Might" (渾身の一撃, "Konshin no Ichigeki"); 82. "The Abyss" (過去と現在, "Kako to Genzai"); 83. "Pride and Companions" (意地と仲間, "Iji to Nakama"); 84. "Hero's Strike" (英雄の一撃, "Eiyū no Ichigeki"); 85. "Delight" (歓喜, "Kanki"); 86. "Conflict" (紛紜, "Fun'un")

==== Chapters not in tankōbon format ====
- Step 87. Shōtaijō (招待状)
- Step 88. "Party Night" Pātī Naito (パーティーナイト)
- Step 89. (Shall We Dance?)
- Step 90.

=== Is It Wrong to Try to Pick Up Girls in a Dungeon? II ===
A 2nd season has started and already been collected into six volumes.

The events of the 6th book of the light novel were skipped for an unknown reason starting immediately with the 7th book instead.

No.	Original release date	Original ISBN	English release date	English ISBN
1	July 22, 2020	978-4-7575-6769-6	November 16, 2021	978-1-9753-3807-7
1. "The Goddess' Campanella" (女神のカンパネラ, "Megami no Kanpanera"); 2. "Smooth Sailing?" (順風満帆？, "Junpuu Manpo"); 3. "Run Cranel" (走れクラネル, "Hashire Kuraneru"); 4. "Run Cranel 2" (走れクラネル 2, "Hashire Kuraneru 2"); 4. "Run Cranel 3" (走れクラネル 3, "Hashire Kuraneru 3"); 5. "Run Cranel 4" (走れクラネル 4, "Hashire Kuraneru 4"); 6. "Run Cranel 5" (走れクラネル 5, "Hashire Kuraneru 5")
2	March 25, 2021	978-4-7575-7169-3	May 3, 2022	978-1-9753-4206-7
7. "The Anguish of the Fox and Rabbit 1" (狐兎憂悶, "Kitsune Usagi Yūmon"); 8. "The Anguish of the Fox and Rabbit 2" (狐兎憂悶 2, "Kitsune Usagi Yūmon 2"); 9. "The Anguish of the Fox and Rabbit 3" (狐兎憂悶 3, "Kitsune Usagi Yūmon 3"); 10. "The Anguish of the Fox and Rabbit 4" (狐兎憂悶 4, "Kitsune Usagi Yūmon 4"); 11. "Yoshiwara x Utakata 1" (ヨシワラxウタカタ 1, "Yoshiwara x Utakata 1"); 12. "Yoshiwara x Utakata 2" (ヨシワラxウタカタ 2, "Yoshiwara x Utakata 2"); 13. "Yoshiwara x Utakata 3" (ヨシワラxウタカタ 3, "Yoshiwara x Utakata 3")
3	December 25, 2021	978-4-7575-7647-6	March 21, 2023	978-1-9753-6131-0
14. "Killing Stone 1" (殺生石 1, Sesshōseki 1); 15. "Killing Stone 2" (殺生石 2, Sesshōseki 2); 16. "Killing Stone 3" (殺生石 3, Sesshōseki 3); 17. "Killing Stone 4" (殺生石 4, Sesshōseki 4); 18. "Killing Stone 5" (殺生石 5, Sesshōseki 5); 19. "Yearning to Be a Hero 1" (英雄切望 1, Eiyū Setsubō 1); 20. "Yearning to Be a Hero 2" (英雄切望 2, Eiyū Setsubō 2); 21. "Yearning to Be a Hero 3" (英雄切望 3, Eiyū Setsubō 3)
4	January 25, 2023	978-4-7575-8354-2	October 17, 2023	978-1-9753-7543-0
22. "Yearning to Be a Hero 4" (英雄切望 4, Eiyū Setsubō 4); 23. "Yearning to Be a Hero 5" (英雄切望 5, Eiyū Setsubō 5); 24. "Yearning to Be a Hero 6" (英雄切望 6, Eiyū Setsubō 6); 25. "Yearning to Be a Hero 7" (英雄切望 7, Eiyū Setsubō 7); 26. "Yearning to Be a Hero 8" (英雄切望 8, Eiyū Setsubō 8); 27. "Yearning to Be a Hero 9" (英雄切望 9, Eiyū Setsubō 9); 28. "Goddess War 1" (ゴッデス・ウォー 1, Goddesu Wō 1); 29. "Goddess War 2" (ゴッデス・ウォー 2, Goddesu Wō 2); 30. "Goddess War 3" (ゴッデス・ウォー 3, Goddesu Wō 3); 31. "Goddess War 4" (ゴッデス・ウォー 4, Goddesu Wō 4)
5	November 25, 2023	978-4-7575-8912-4	October 8, 2024	979-8-8554-0219-3
32. "Rakia 1" (ラキア 1, Rakia 1); 33. "Rakia 2" (ラキア 2, Rakia 2); 34. "Rakia 3" (ラキア 3, Rakia 3); 35. "Rakia 4" (ラキア 4, Rakia 4); 36. "Rakia 5" (ラキア 5, Rakia 5); 37. "Rakia 6" (ラキア 6, Rakia 6); 38. "Rakia 7" (ラキア 7, Rakia 7); 39. "Rakia 8" (ラキア 8, Rakia 8); 40. "Rakia 9" (ラキア 9, Rakia 9)
6	February 25, 2025	978-4-7575-9689-4	December 16, 2025	979-8-8554-2461-4
41. "Rakia 10" (ラキア 10, Rakia 10); 42. "Rakia 11" (ラキア 11, Rakia 11); 43. "Rakia 12" (ラキア 12, Rakia 12); 44. "Rakia 13" (ラキア 13, Rakia 13); 45. "Rakia 14" (ラキア 14, Rakia 14); 46. "Rakia 15 – A Certain Goddess's Love Song 1" (ラキア１５ −とある女神の愛歌１−, Rakia 15 −To aru Megami no ai Uta 1−); 47. "Rakia 16 – A Certain Goddess's Love Song 2" (ラキア１６ −とある女神の愛歌２−, Rakia 16 −To aru Megami no ai Uta 2−); 48. "Rakia 17 – A Certain Goddess's Love Song 3" (ラキア１７ −とある女神の愛歌３−, Rakia 17 −To aru Megami no ai Uta 3−); 49. "Rakia 18 – A Certain Goddess's Love Song 4" (ラキア１８ −とある女神の愛歌４−, Rakia 18 −To aru Megami no ai Uta 4−); 50. "Rakia 19 – A Certain Goddess's Love Song 5" (ラキア１９ −とある女神の愛歌５−, Rakia 19 −To aru Megami no ai Uta 5−); 51. "The Neighborhood Girl's Secret 1" (街娘の秘密 1, Machi Musume no Himitsu 1)
7	July 24, 2026	978-4-3010-0651-0	—	—
52. TBD (街娘の秘密 2, Machi Musume no Himitsu 2); 53. TBD (街娘の秘密 3, Machi Musume no Himitsu 3); 54. TBD (街娘の秘密 4, Machi Musume no Himitsu 4); 55. TBD (街娘の秘密 5, Machi Musume no Himitsu 5); 56. TBD (街娘の秘密 6, Machi Musume no Himitsu 6); 57. TBD (異形の少女 1, Igyō no Shōjo 1); 58. TBD (異形の少女 2, Igyō no Shōjo 2); 59. TBD (異形の少女 3, Igyō no Shōjo 3); 60. TBD (竜娘のいる日常 1, Ryū Musume no Iru Nichijō 1); 61. TBD (竜娘のいる日常 2, Ryū Musume no Iru Nichijō 2)

==== Chapters not in tankōbon format ====
62. TBD (竜娘のいる日常 3, Ryū Musume no Iru Nichijō 3)
63. TBD (世界と現実と怪物, Sekai to Genjitsu to Kaibutsu)
64. TBD (世界と現実と怪物 2, Sekai to Genjitsu to Kaibutsu 2)
65. TBD (世界と現実と怪物 3, Sekai to Genjitsu to Kaibutsu 3)
66. TBD (世界と現実と怪物 4, Sekai to Genjitsu to Kaibutsu 4)
67. TBD (世界と現実と怪物 5, Sekai to Genjitsu to Kaibutsu 5)

=== Episode Lyu ===
The Episode Lyu manga series is a special story focused on character Lyu Lion from the main series.

No.	Title	Original release date	English release date
1	Episode Lyu; Episode Ryu (Episodeリュー)	March 13, 2017; 978-4-7575-5270-8	November 13, 2018; 978-1-9753-0146-0
2	Episode Lyu; Episode Ryu (Episodeリュー)	July 22, 2017; 978-4-7575-5401-6	February 19, 2019; 978-1-9753-0149-1
3	Episode Lyu; Episode Ryu (Episodeリュー)	November 22, 2017; 978-4-7575-5518-1	May 21, 2019; 978-1-9753-0152-1
4	Episode Lyu; Episode Ryu (Episodeリュー)	March 22, 2018; 978-4-7575-5656-0	August 20, 2019; 978-1-9753-8484-5
5	Episode Lyu; Episode Ryu (Episodeリュー)	July 21, 2018; 978-4-7575-5784-0	November 26, 2019; 978-1-9753-3186-3
6	Episode Lyu; Episode Ryu (Episodeリュー)	December 13, 2018; 978-4-7575-5908-0	February 18, 2020; 978-1-9753-3189-4

=== Episode Freya ===
The Episode Freya manga series is a special story focused on the goddess Freya and the executives of her familia.

No.	Title	Original release date	English release date
1	Familia Chronicle Episode Freya 1 Episode Freya 1 (Episodeフレイヤ 1)	December 25, 2021; 978-4-7575-7649-0	April 18, 2023; 978-1-9753-6654-4
2	Familia Chronicle Episode Freya 2 Episode Freya 2 (Episodeフレイヤ 2)	July 22, 2022; 978-4-7575-8033-6	September 19, 2023; 978-1-9753-7169-2
3	Familia Chronicle Episode Freya 3 Episode Freya 3 (Episodeフレイヤ 3)	January 25, 2023; 978-4-7575-8355-9	February 20, 2024; 978-1-9753-7545-4
4	Familia Chronicle Episode Freya 4 Episode Freya 4 (Episodeフレイヤ 4)	July 12, 2023; 978-4-7575-8669-7	November 19, 2024; 979-8-8554-0217-9
5	Familia Chronicle Episode Freya 5 Episode Freya 5 (Episodeフレイヤ 5)	March 22, 2024; 978-4-7575-9086-1	April 22, 2025; 979-8-8554-1009-9

=== Is It Wrong to Try to Pick Up Girls in a Dungeon? 4-koma: Days of Goddess ===
No.	Original release date	Original ISBN	English release date	English ISBN
1	May 15, 2015	978-4-7575-4639-4	March 20, 2018	978-0-316-48013-0
2	May 23, 2017	978-4-7575-5356-9	September 18, 2018	978-1-9753-8227-8

=== Is It Wrong to Try to Pick Up Girls in a Dungeon? Memoria Freese ===
No.	Original release date	Original ISBN	English release date	English ISBN
1	December 25, 2021	978-4-7575-7648-3	June 20, 2023	978-1-9753-6653-7
2	July 22, 2022	978-4-7575-8034-3	December 12, 2023	978-1-9753-7171-5
3	February 7, 2023	978-4-7575-8382-5	September 17, 2024	979-8-8554-0221-6
4	November 25, 2023	978-4-7575-8913-1	December 10, 2024	979-8-8554-0241-4
