= My Dear, Curse-Casting Vampiress =

Japanese manga series

- First tankōbon volume cover

僕の呪いの吸血姫 (Boku no Noroi no Kyūketsuki)
- Genre: Dark fantasy; Romance; Vampire
- Manga
- Written by: Chisaki Kanai
- Published by: Square Enix
- English publisher: NA: Yen Press
- Magazine: Monthly Shōnen Gangan
- Original run: July 12, 2021 – present
- Volumes: 10
- icon

My Dear, Curse-Casting Vampiress (Japanese: 僕の呪いの吸血姫, Hepburn: Boku no Noroi no Kyūketsuki) is a Japanese manga series written and illustrated by Chisaki Kanai. It has been serialized in Square Enix's shōnen manga magazine Monthly Shōnen Gangan since July 2021.

== Publication ==
Written and illustrated by Chisaki Kanai, My Dear, Curse-Casting Vampiress started in Square Enix's shōnen manga magazine Monthly Shōnen Gangan on July 12, 2021. Square Enix has collected its chapters into individual tankōbon volumes. The first volume was released on February 13, 2022. As of November 12, 2026, ten volumes have been released.

In November 2022, Yen Press announced that they had licensed the manga for English release in North America. The first volume was released on May 23, 2023. Square Enix started publishing the series' chapters in English on its Manga Up! global service in July 2023.

=== Volumes ===
No.	Original release date	Original ISBN	English release date	English ISBN
1	February 12, 2022	978-4-7575-7741-1	May 23, 2023	978-1-9753-6490-8
2	June 10, 2022	978-4-7575-7960-6	September 19, 2023	978-1-9753-6492-2
3	November 11, 2022	978-4-7575-8249-1	January 23, 2024	978-1-9753-7535-5
4	June 12, 2023	978-4-7575-8609-3	June 18, 2024	978-1-9753-8907-9
5	November 10, 2023	978-4-7575-8898-1	December 10, 2024	979-8-8554-0229-2
6	June 12, 2024	978-4-7575-9241-4	August 26, 2025	979-8-8554-1462-2
7	December 12, 2024	978-4-7575-9565-1	March 24, 2026	979-8-8554-2471-3
8	August 8, 2025	978-4-301-00003-7	August 25, 2026	979-8-8554-3610-5
9	April 11, 2026	978-4-301-00471-4	—	—
10	November 12, 2026	978-4-301-00874-3	—	—
