= Boyish Girlfriend =

Japanese manga series

- First tankōbon volume cover

ボーイッシュ彼女が可愛すぎる (Bōisshu Kanojo ga Kawaii Sugiru)
- Genre: Romance
- Manga
- Written by: Gyūnyūmugigohan
- Published by: Square Enix
- English publisher: NA: Square Enix Manga & Books
- Imprint: Gangan Comics Pixiv
- Magazine: Gangan Pixiv; (March 15, 2025 – present)
- Original run: August 29, 2024 – present
- Volumes: 6

Boyish Girlfriend (ボーイッシュ彼女が可愛すぎる, Bōisshu Kanojo ga Kawaii Sugiru) is a Japanese manga series written and illustrated by Gyūnyūmugigohan. It began serialization on the author's Twitter account in August 2024. It was later acquired by Square Enix who began serializing on the Pixiv Comic website under their Gangan Pixiv brand in March 2025.

== Synopsis ==
Akira and Daichi have been friends since preschool. When they start going to separate high schools, they make the decision to start dating. One day, as Daichi visits Akira's school, he sees Akira in a maid outfit with cat ears on her head. Despite knowing that Akira is a tomboy who isn't fond of girly clothing, he finds it cute, much to Akira's dismay.

== Publication ==
Written and illustrated by Gyūnyūmugigohan, Boyish Girlfriend began serialization on the author's Twitter account on August 29, 2024. It was later acquired by Square Enix who began serializing it on the Pixiv Comic website under their Gangan Pixiv brand on March 15, 2025. Its chapters have been compiled into six tankōbon volumes as of August 2026.

The series is published in English on Square Enix's Manga Up! Global app. In February 2026, Square Enix Manga & Books announced that they had licensed the series for English publication, with the first volume set to release in September later in the year.

No.	Original release date	Original ISBN	North American release date	North American ISBN
1	March 22, 2025	978-4-7575-9755-6	September 22, 2026	979-8-89910-024-6
1. "My Boyish Girlfriend Is Too Cute"; 2. "My Boyish Girlfriend's Casual Clothes Are Too Cute"; 3. "My Boyish Girlfriend's Casual Clothes Are Too Loose"; 4. "Holding Hands with My Boyish Girlfriend Is Too Hard"; 5. "My Boyish Girlfriend's Sports Day Outfit Is Too Cute"; 6. "My Boyish Girlfriend's Work Uniform Is Too Cute"; 7. "My Boyish Girlfriend's Gyaru Getup Is Too Cute"; 8. "My Boyish Friend's Love Life Is Too Irritating"; 9. "My Boyish Girlfriend's Halloween Costume Is Too Cute"; 10. "My Boyish Girlfriend's Grown-up Clothes Are Too Cute"; 11. "My Boyish Girlfriend's Overalls Are Too Cute"; 12. "My Boyish Girlfriend's Date Outfit Is Too Cute"; 13. "My First Date with My Boyish Girlfriend Is Too Awkward"; Bonus: "My Boyish Girlfriend's Underwear Is Too Cute"
2	May 22, 2025	978-4-7575-9865-2	December 22, 2026	979-8-89910-025-3
3	August 21, 2025	978-4-301-00020-4	—	—
4	November 20, 2025	978-4-301-00182-9; 978-4-301-00183-6 (SE)	—	—
5	April 22, 2026	978-4-301-00469-1; 978-4-301-00470-7 (SE)	—	—
6	August 21, 2026	978-4-301-00715-9; 978-4-301-00716-6 (SE)	—	—

== Reception ==
The series was ranked fourth in the Nationwide Publishers Recommended Comics list of 2026.
