= VTuber Shigemi Kusamura: I'm My Oshi's Favorite =

Japanese manga series

- First tankōbon volume cover

VTuber草村しげみ～遠くに行ってしまった気がした推しが全然遠くに行ってくれない話～ (Buichūbā Kusamura Shigemi: Tōku ni Itte Shimatta Ki ga Shita Oshi ga Zenzen Tōku ni Itte Kurenai Hanashi)
- Genre: Romantic comedy
- Manga
- Written by: Sakamegane
- Published by: Square Enix
- English publisher: NA: Square Enix
- Imprint: Gangan Comics Pixiv
- Magazine: Gangan Pixiv; (April 5, 2025 – present)
- Original run: November 26, 2023 – present
- Volumes: 3

VTuber Shigemi Kusamura: I'm My Oshi's Favorite (VTuber草村しげみ～遠くに行ってしまった気がした推しが全然遠くに行ってくれない話～, Buichūbā Kusamura Shigemi: Tōku ni Itte Shimatta Ki ga Shita Oshi ga Zenzen Tōku ni Itte Kurenai Hanashi) is a Japanese manga series written and illustrated by Sakamegane. It began serialization on the author's Twitter account in November 2023. It was later acquired by Square Enix who began serializing it on the Pixiv Comic website under their Gangan Pixiv brand in April 2025.

== Synopsis ==
The series is centered around VTuber Shigemi Kusamura, and her first fan Nanashino. Shigemi Kusamura has a following of 1.3 million subscribers, and while Nanashino is proud of her reaching that milestone, he does feel that due to the growth of the channel he isn't worth Shigemi's time. However, Shigemi, who has strong romantic feelings for him, still holds Nanashino in high regard as she replies to all of his comments on her streams.

== Publication ==
Written and illustrated by Sakamegane, VTuber Shigemi Kusamura: I'm My Oshi's Favorite began serialization on the author's Twitter account on November 26, 2023. It was later acquired by Square Enix who began serializing it on the Pixiv Comic website under their Gangan Pixiv brand on April 5, 2025. Its chapters have been compiled into three tankōbon volumes as of October 2026.

The series' chapters are published in English on Square Enix's Manga Up! Global app.

No.	Release date	ISBN
1	April 22, 2025	978-4-7575-9812-6
2	December 22, 2025	978-4-301-00233-8
3	October 22, 2026	978-4-301-00827-9

== Reception ==
The series was nominated for the 10th Next Manga Awards in 2024 in the web category and was ranked third.
