= My Shady Little Brother, Gyomei =

Japanese manga series

- First tankōbon volume cover

妖しいね☆わたしの弟ギョーメイくん (Ayashii ne ☆ Watashi no Otōto Gyōmei-kun)
- Genre: Comedy, slice of life
- Manga
- Written by: Rocomi Maruo
- Published by: Square Enix
- English publisher: NA: Square Enix
- Imprint: Gangan Comics Joker
- Magazine: Nico Nico Seiga
- Original run: November 7, 2023 – present
- Volumes: 3

My Shady Little Brother, Gyomei (妖しいね☆わたしの弟ギョーメイくん, Ayashii ne ☆ Watashi no Otōto Gyōmei-kun) is a Japanese manga series written and illustrated by Rocomi Maruo. It was originally published as a webcomic on the author's Twitter account in September 2023. It later began serialization on the Nico Nico Seiga website in November 2023, with its volume releases handled by Square Enix.

== Synopsis ==
Due to his narrow-eyed appearance, most people suspect that Akiharu is a delinquent up to no good. However, in reality, he is a humble young man who deeply adores his older sister.

== Characters ==
Akiharu (暁明) / Gyomei (ギョーメイ, Gyōmei)
Voiced by: Kengo Kawanishi (PV)

== Media ==
=== Manga ===
Written and illustrated by Rocomi Maruo, My Shady Little Brother, Gyomei was originally published as a webcomic on the author's Twitter account on September 1, 2023. It later began serialization on the Nico Nico Seiga website on November 7, 2023. Its chapters have been compiled into three tankōbon volumes under Square Enix's Gangan Comics Joker imprint as of November 20, 2026.

The series' chapters are published in English on Square Enix's Manga Up! Global app.

No.	Release date	ISBN
1	June 20, 2024	978-4-7575-9267-4
2	May 22, 2025	978-4-7575-9858-4
3	November 20, 2026	978-4-301-00893-4

=== Other ===
A promotional video was uploaded to Square Enix's YouTube channel on June 19, 2024. It featured voice acting from Kengo Kawanishi.

== Reception ==
The series was nominated for the tenth Next Manga Awards in the web category in 2024.
