= Why She Loves Scum =

Japanese manga series

- First wideban volume cover

彼女がクズを愛するワケは。 (Kanojo ga Kuzu o Aisuru Wake wa)
- Genre: Romantic comedy
- Manga
- Written by: Rui Ikeda
- Published by: Square Enix
- English publisher: NA: Square Enix
- Imprint: Gangan Comics Pixiv
- Magazine: Gangan Pixiv
- Original run: November 2, 2024 – present
- Volumes: 4

Why She Loves Scum (彼女がクズを愛するワケは。, Kanojo ga Kuzu o Aisuru Wake wa) is a Japanese manga series written and illustrated by Rui Ikeda. It began as a webcomic published on author's Twitter account in March 2024. It was later acquired by Square Enix who began serializing it on the Pixiv Comic website under their Gangan Pixiv brand in November 2024.

== Plot ==
The series is centered around Hiro, a broke, unemployed, and non-committed man, and Mi, a woman who has only dated men who are not fully committed to her. Hiro has dated Mi for a week, and Mi feels grateful to see how committed he is to their relationship. In reality, Hiro is actually of taking advantage of Mi's kindness, and looking for the perfect opportunity to dump her.

== Publication ==
Written and illustrated by Rui Ikeda, Why She Loves Scum initially began as a webcomic published on the author's Twitter account on March 1, 2024. It was later acquired by Square Enix who began serializing it on the Pixiv Comic website under their Gangan Pixiv brand on November 2, 2024. Its chapters have been compiled into four wideban volumes as of August 2026.

The series' chapters are published in English on Square Enix's Manga Up! Global website and app.

No.	Release date	ISBN
1	November 21, 2024	978-4-7575-9480-7
2	May 22, 2025	978-4-7575-9863-8
3	January 22, 2026	978-4-301-00289-5
4	August 21, 2026	978-4-301-00717-3

== Reception ==
The series was nominated for the 10th Next Manga Awards in 2024 in the web category and was ranked sixth.
