= The Newbie Princess Doesn't Want a Game Over! =

Japanese manga series

- The Newbie Princess Doesn't Want a Game Over! Survive Through the Power of Simping
- Cover of the first volume

ザコ姫さまは生きのびたい! 〜処刑の危機は、姫プレイで乗り切ります〜 (Zako Hime-sama wa Ikinobitai! 〜 Shokei no Kiki wa, Hime Purei de Norikirimasu 〜)
- Genre: Isekai; Romance
- Manga
- Written by: Shūmai Kogeta; Kensuke Koba (composition)
- Illustrated by: Omiomi
- Published by: Square Enix
- English publisher: NA: Square Enix
- Imprint: Gangan Comics Online
- Magazine: Gangan Online
- Original run: January 10, 2023 – present
- Volumes: 4
- icon

The Newbie Princess Doesn't Want a Game Over! Survive Through the Power of Simping (Note: Japanese: ザコ姫さまは生きのびたい! 〜処刑の危機は、姫プレイで乗り切ります〜, Hepburn: Zako Hime-sama wa Ikinobitai! 〜 Shokei no Kiki wa, Hime Purei de Norikirimasu 〜) is a Japanese manga series written by Shūmai Kogeta and illustrated by Omiomi, with composition by Kensuke Koba. It began serialization on Square Enix's Gangan Online manga website in January 2023.

== Plot ==
One day, Princess Ceslia's memories of her previous life come back to her, and she remembers that she was a high school girl and a gamer. She realizes that she is reincarnated as a character in the game "Resonant Fantasia" and remember that it is a scenario where he will be executed three years later. Struggle using game skills and "Princess Play" to avoid the fate of execution.

== Publication ==
Written by Shūmai Kogeta and illustrated by Omiomi with composition by Kensuke Koba, The Newbie Princess Doesn't Want a Game Over! Survive Through the Power of Simping began serialization on Square Enix's manga website Gangan Online on January 10, 2023. The first volume was released on April 12, 2023. As of December 11, 2025, the manga has four volumes.

The series is published in English on Square Enix's Manga Up! Global app since February 13, 2024.

No.	Japanese release date	Japanese ISBN
1	April 12, 2023	978-4-7575-8530-0
2	October 12, 2023	978-4-7575-8858-5
3	August 9, 2024	978-4-7575-9361-9
4	December 11, 2025	978-4-301-00222-2
