= Proud to Be the Villainess =

Japanese light novel series

- First light novel volume cover

悪役令嬢の矜持～婚約者を奪い取って義姉を追い出した私は、どうやら今から破滅するようです。～ (Akuyaku Reijō no Kyōji: Konyakusha o Ubaitotte Gishi o Oidashita Watashi wa, Dōyara Ima kara Hametsu suru Yō desu)
- Genre: Fantasy; Romance; Suspense
- Novel series
- Written by: Mary Doe
- Published by: Shōsetsuka ni Narō
- Original run: June 4, 2022 – present
- Light novel
- Written by: Mary Doe
- Illustrated by: Kuga Huna
- Published by: Square Enix
- English publisher: NA: J-Novel Club
- Imprint: SQEX Novel
- Original run: March 7, 2023 – present
- Volumes: 8
- Manga

Proud to Be the Villainess: I'm Doomed After Stealing my Half-Sister's Fiancé and Having Her Banished
- Written by: Mary Doe; Yume (composition) (ch. 17–)
- Illustrated by: Suzuka Stellagi (chs. 1–16); Medamayaki (ch. 17–)
- Published by: Square Enix
- English publisher: NA: Square Enix
- Imprint: Gangan Comics UP!
- Magazine: Manga Up!
- Original run: October 15, 2023 – present
- Volumes: 4

Proud to Be the Villainess (悪役令嬢の矜持～婚約者を奪い取って義姉を追い出した私は、どうやら今から破滅するようです。～, Akuyaku Reijō no Kyōji: Konyakusha o Ubaitotte Gishi o Oidashita Watashi wa, Dōyara Ima kara Hametsu suru Yō desu) is a Japanese light novel series written by Mary Doe and illustrated by Kuga Huna. It began serialization as a web novel published on Shōsetsuka ni Narō in June 2022. It was later acquired by Square Enix who began publishing it under their SQEX Novel imprint in March 2023. A manga adaptation illustrated by Suzuka Stellagi began serialization on Square Enix's Manga Up! manga service in October 2023.

== Synopsis ==
Wellmy Ernest, a daughter of a commoner becomes a member of an Earl's family as her mother marries the Earl. She becomes sisters with the Earl's daughter Iora, and makes her life a nightmare, taking her love interest and her position as heir to her family. She later attempts to marry Iora off to Aides Ormirage, a Lord of Magic who is said to be cruel, and it leads to her and her parents getting tried for their abuse of Iora, just as Wellmy had planned.

== Media ==
=== Light novel ===
Written by Mary Doe, Proud to Be the Villainess began serialization as a web novel published on Shōsetsuka ni Narō on June 4, 2022. It was later acquired by Square Enix who began publishing it with illustrations by Kuga Huna under their SQEX Novel light novel imprint on March 7, 2023. Eight volumes have been released as of October 7, 2026.

In February 2026, J-Novel Club announced that they had licensed the series for English publication.

No.	Title	Original release date	North American release date
1	If My Doom Can Be Her Happily Ever After, So Be It! 私の破滅を対価に、最愛の人に祝福を。	March 7, 2023; 978-4-7575-8462-4	May 11, 2026; 978-1-7183-9634-0
My Doom; 1. "Wellmy and Iora"; 2. "A Perfectly Calculated Condemnation Scene"; 3. "The Scheme Collapses"; 4. "Wellmy's Defeat"; 5. "After the Party"; 6. "The Doom Known as Love"; Her Happily Ever After; 1. "Rescuing the Maidens"; 2. "Iora and Wellmy"; 3. "The Lord of Magic's Past"; 4. "The Fool's End"; 5. "The Lord of Magic and the Villainess; the Prince and Cinderella" (Extra story); Extra: "Journey Up North"
2	Upon the Despair You Face Blooms the Wicked Flower of Hope あなたが臨む絶望に、悪の華から希望を。	October 6, 2023; 978-4-7575-8845-5	August 12, 2026; 978-1-7183-9636-4
Upon the Despair You Face; 1. "The Villainess Uses Her Charm"; 2. "Wellmy's Resturn"; 3. "Darristea's Mad Scheme"; 4. "Theresalo's Repentance"; 5. "Wellmy, the Villainess's Scheme"; 6. "The Villains' Foolish Sincerity"; 7. "Abducted"; 8. "His Jewel"; Blooms the Wicked Flower of Hope; 1. "The King's Orders"; 2. "The Prince's Decision"; 3. "The Saint's Turmoil"; 4. "The Swordsman's Visit"; 5. "The Villainess Worries"; 6. "Wellmy's Scheme" (Exclusive story)
3	From the Hollow Abyss Onward to a Tranquil Future 深淵の虚ろより、遥か未来の安寧を。	March 7, 2024; 978-4-7575-9089-2	December 16, 2026; 978-1-7183-9638-8
4	— 四花の憂う先行きに、朱瞳が齎す最善を。	September 6, 2024; 978-4-7575-9409-8	—
5	— 導くは朱紫の双玉、其は森羅にして万象故に。	April 7, 2025; 978-4-7575-9787-7	—
6	— 色は匂へど散りぬるを、浅き夢見し酔ひもせず。	September 5, 2025; 978-4-301-00045-7	—
7	— 貴女を蝕む冤罪に、わたくしからの贖罪を。	April 7, 2026; 978-4-301-00251-2	—
8	— 淀んだ過去の亡霊に、濯ぐ手向けの花束を。	October 7, 2026; 978-4-301-00799-9	—

=== Manga ===
A manga adaptation illustrated by Suzuka Stellagi, titled Proud to Be the Villainess: I'm Doomed After Stealing my Half-Sister's Fiancé and Having Her Banished, began serialization on Square Enix's Manga Up! manga service on October 15, 2023. Stellagi would serialize the manga until its 16th chapter, afterwards she was replaced by Yume handling composition and Medamayaki handling illustrations from chapter 17 and onwards. The manga's chapters have been compiled into four tankōbon volumes as of June 2026.

The manga's chapters are published in English on Square Enix's Manga Up! Global app.

No.	Release date	ISBN
1	March 7, 2024	978-4-7575-9082-3
2	September 6, 2024	978-4-7575-9405-0
3	October 7, 2025	978-4-301-00094-5
4	June 5, 2026	978-4-301-00558-2

== Reception ==
The manga adaptation was ranked 8th in the sixth Sanyodo Bookstore Comic Awards in 2025.
