= Monster Eater =

Japanese light novel series

- First light novel volume cover

魔物喰らいの冒険者 (Mamonogurai no Bōkensha)
- Genre: Fantasy; Gourmet
- Novel series
- Written by: Renkinō
- Published by: Shōsetsuka ni Narō
- Original run: March 31, 2023 – present
- Light novel
- Written by: Renkinō
- Illustrated by: Kawaku
- Published by: Earth Star Entertainment
- Imprint: Earth Star Novel
- Original run: August 18, 2023 – January 17, 2024
- Volumes: 2
- Manga
- Written by: Renkinō
- Illustrated by: Kei Ichimatsu; Tanako Tanao
- Published by: Line Corporation
- English publisher: Webtoon
- Imprint: Line Comics
- Magazine: Line Manga
- Original run: June 29, 2024 – present
- Volumes: 4
- Manga
- Written by: Renkinō
- Illustrated by: TATE
- Published by: Square Enix
- English publisher: NA: Square Enix
- Imprint: Gangan Comics UP!
- Magazine: Manga Up!
- Original run: August 21, 2024 – present
- Volumes: 3
- Anime television series
- Directed by: Hikaru Satō
- Music by: onoken
- Studio: Imagica Infos; Imageworks Studio
- Licensed by: Remow: SEA: Medialink
- Original network: Tokyo MX
- Original run: April 3, 2026 – June 19, 2026
- Episodes: 12

Monster Eater (Japanese: 魔物喰らいの冒険者, Hepburn: Mamonogurai no Bōkensha) is a Japanese light novel series written by Renkinō and illustrated by Kawaku. It began serialization online in March 2023 on the user-generated novel publishing website Shōsetsuka ni Narō. It was later acquired by Earth Star Entertainment, who published two volumes between August 2023 and January 2024 under their Earth Star Novel imprint. A webtoon adaptation illustrated by Kei Ichimatsu and Tanako Tanao and produced by whomor has been serialized online via Line Corporation's Line Manga website since June 2024 and has been collected in four digital volumes. A manga adaptation with art by TATE has been serialized online via Square Enix's Manga Up! manga website since August 2024 and has been collected in three tankōbon volumes. A "light anime" television series adaptation produced by Imagica Infos and Imageworks Studio aired from April to June 2026.

== Plot ==
Despite being an adventurer, Rudd has little combat experience and only possesses one skill: Status Abnormality Nullification. To make a living, he gathers medicinal herbs in miasma-filled dungeons, which earns him the scorn of many other adventures. In order to change that, he explores a new labyrinth, but is betrayed by his companion and is caught up in the labyrinth's collapse. Without supplies, he finds himself eating monster meat, despite the strong taboos associated with it. But he realizes that the more he eats, the more powerful he becomes and the more skills he knows.

== Characters ==
Rudd (ルード, Rūdo)
Voiced by: Makoto Furukawa
Rudd is the protagonist of the series, who was born with the "Status Ailment Immunity" skill that made him invincible against all types of debuffs and status ailments. But Rudd was looked down on and ridiculed as his skill is unsuitable for combat, as a result he was forced to make his living by picking herbs for the Adventurer's Guild. This all changed when his first party members betrayed him by using him as bait for some monsters and left him to die in a dungeon. Out of desperation, he was forced to eat some monsters to survive and learned that his skill nullfies the negative effects of monster meat and allowed him to gain their skills simultaneously. After escaping the dungeon, Rudd exposed his former party's misdeeds and demonstrated his newfound strength and earned the respect and fear of the other adventurers. Eventually, he met the Adventurer Elyssia who he rescued and formed a party with, the two would continue to travel and find new monsters for Rudd to eat and gain skils from.
Elyssia (エリシア, Erishia)
Voiced by: Yuki Nakashima
Elyssia was a former S-Rank Adventurer who was forced to temporarily retire after she was inflicted with a curse that caused her levels to decrease and weakened her as time passed. Elyssia was ambushed in a dungeon by some corrupt adventurers who wanted to capture and sell her into slavery, but was luckily saved by Rudd who removed her curse by using his "Status Ailment Immunity" skill. Elyssia then formed a party with Rudd as thanks for his help, she eventually learned about his true capabilities and accepted that part of him. The two continued to travel together and help Rudd find new monsters to eat and gain abilities from. Elyssia is shown to have a high tolerance to alcohol and is able beat just about anyone in a drinking match.

== Media ==
=== Light novel ===
Written by Renkinō, Monster Eater initially began serialization on the user-generated novel publishing website Shōsetsuka ni Narō on March 31, 2023. It was later acquired by Earth Star Entertainment who published the series with illustrations by Kawaku under their Earth Star Novel light novel imprint in two volumes from August 18, 2023, to January 17, 2024.

No.	Release date	ISBN
1	August 18, 2023	978-4-8030-1823-3
2	January 17, 2024	978-4-8030-1896-7

=== Webtoon ===
A webtoon adaptation illustrated by Kei Ichimatsu and Tanako Tanao and produced by whomor began serialization on Line Corporation's Line Manga website on June 29, 2024. Four digital volumes have been released as of April 3, 2026. The webtoon is published in various languages (including English) by Webtoon.

No.	Release date	ISBN
1	January 15, 2026	—
2	January 15, 2026	—
3	April 3, 2026	—
4	April 3, 2026	—

=== Manga ===
A manga adaptation illustrated by TATE began serialization on Square Enix's Manga Up! manga service on August 21, 2024. The manga's chapters have been collected into three tankōbon volumes as of March 2026.

The manga's chapters are published in English on Square Enix's Manga Up! Global service.

No.	Release date	ISBN
1	December 6, 2024	978-4-7575-9557-6
2	July 7, 2025	978-4-7575-9944-4
3	March 6, 2026	978-4-301-00374-8

=== Anime ===
A "light anime" television series adaptation was announced on January 13, 2026. The series is produced by AnimationID, animated by Imagica Infos and Imageworks Studio and directed by Hikaru Satō. It aired on Tokyo MX from April 3 to June 19, 2026. The opening theme song is "Shōki no Sata" (正気の沙汰; 'Insane') performed by NEE, while the ending theme song is "STORY" performed by niina. Remow licensed the series for streaming on the "It's Anime" free ad-supported streaming television (FAST) channel on Samsung TV Plus. Medialink licensed the series for streaming on Ani-One Asia's YouTube channel.
