= Miss Miyazen Would Love to Get Closer to You =

Japanese manga series

- First tankōbon volume cover

お近づきになりたい宮膳さん (Ochikadzuki ni Naritai Miyazen-san)
- Genre: Romantic comedy
- Manga
- Written by: Akitaka
- Published by: Square Enix
- English publisher: NA: Kodansha USA
- Imprint: Gangan Comics Joker
- Magazine: Monthly Gangan Joker; (February 22, 2020 – August 20, 2021)
- Original run: April 4, 2019 – August 20, 2021
- Volumes: 4

Miss Miyazen Would Love to Get Closer to You (お近づきになりたい宮膳さん, Ochikadzuki ni Naritai Miyazen-san) is a Japanese manga series written and illustrated by Akitaka. It was initially published on the author's Pixiv account from April 2019 to August 2021. It was later acquired by Square Enix who published the series in their shōnen manga magazine Monthly Gangan Joker from February 2020 to August 2021.

== Synopsis ==
The series is centered around the characters, Sakura Miyazen and Shota Matsuyabashi. Miyazen and Matsubayashi are polar opposites, with Miyazen being an upper-class girl and Matsubayashi being a delinquent. The two are oblivious to each other's feelings, and want to communicate with each other, but are not sure where to start.

== Publication ==
Written and illustrated by Akitaka, Miss Miyazen Would Love to Get Closer to You was published on the author's Pixiv account from April 3, 2019, to August 20, 2021. It was also serialized in Square Enix's shōnen manga magazine Monthly Gangan Joker from February 22, 2020, to August 20, 2021. The series' chapters were collected into four tankōbon volumes from February 22, 2020, to January 21, 2022.

During their Anime NYC panel, Kodansha USA announced that they licensed the manga for English publication.

No.	Original release date	Original ISBN	North American release date	North American ISBN
1	February 22, 2020	978-4-7575-6532-6	September 27, 2022	978-1-6472-9141-9
1. "A Pair Who Would Love to Get Closer"; 2. "Shootin'"; 3. "Responsibility"; 4. "Cat"; 5. "Shiv"; 6. "Friends"; 7. "Mixed Up"; 8. "I'll Do My Best"; 9. "Marathon"; 10. "Big Fight"; 11. "Cats and Dogs"; 12. "Broad"; 13. "Thanks"; 14. "Studying"; 15. "Closer"
2	September 19, 2020	978-4-7575-6853-2	November 8, 2022	978-1-6472-9142-6
16. "Bump"; 17. "Little Sister"; 18. "Secret"; 19. "Overthinking"; 20. "Small Perks"; 21. "Team Building"; 22. "Guilt"; 23. "Rain"; 24. "Bug"; 25. "Cool"; 26. "Encounter 1"; 27. "Encounter 2"
3	May 21, 2021	978-4-7575-7260-7	February 21, 2023	978-1-6472-9173-0
28. "Texting 1"; 29. "Texting 2"; 30. "Dozing Off"; 31. "One More Sip"; 32. "Assumption"; 33. "Short Jacket"; 34. "Tip Your Hand"; 35. "Master and Student"; 36. "Hairstyle"; 37. "Water Play"; 38. "Hiccups"; 39. "Cute 1"; 40. "Cute 2"; 41. "All of It"; 42. "Getting Weapons"; 43. "Summer Break, Part 1"; 44. "Summer Break, Part 2"; 45. "Your World"
4	January 21, 2022	978-4-7575-7693-3	May 23, 2023	978-1-6472-9213-3
46. "Excitement"; 47. "Back from Break"; 48. "Names"; 49. "Game"; 50. "Guess Who"; 51. "Anything"; 52. "Gofer"; 53. "Sneaky"; 54. "Update"; 55. "Raid"; 56. "Movie"; 57. "Favorite Things"; 58. "The Date"; 59. "The Date Continues"; 60. "I Want to Talk"; 61. "The Two Who Have Gotten Closer"; Bonus: "Getting Even Closer"

== Reception ==
The series was nominated for the sixth Next Manga Awards in the print category, and was ranked twelfth out of fifty nominees.

== See also ==
- Witch Life in a Micro Room, another manga series by the same author
