= The Cynical Knight and Gentle Princess =

Japanese manga series

- The Cynical Knight and Gentle Princess: Building Fairy Homes and a Life Together
- First tankōbon volume cover

ひねくれ騎士とふわふわ姫様 古城暮らしと小さなおうち (Hinekure Kishi to Fuwafuwa Hime-sama: Kojō-gurashi to Chiisana Ouchi)
- Genre: Fantasy; Romance
- Manga
- Written by: Umetaro Aoi
- Published by: Square Enix
- English publisher: NA: Square Enix
- Imprint: Gangan Comics
- Magazine: Monthly Shōnen Gangan
- Original run: November 10, 2023 – present
- Volumes: 4

The Cynical Knight and Gentle Princess: Building Fairy Homes and a Life Together (ひねくれ騎士とふわふわ姫様 古城暮らしと小さなおうち, Hinekure Kishi to Fuwafuwa Hime-sama Kojō-gurashi to Chiisana Ouchi) is a Japanese manga series written and illustrated by Umetaro Aoi. It began serialization in Square Enix's shōnen manga magazine Monthly Shōnen Gangan in November 2023.

== Synopsis ==
The series is centered around the relationship between the knight Lux and the betrothed princess Cronya. Lux, a cynical knight who has been treated horribly since his childhood due to him being able to see fairies that others can't, initially plans to decline Cronya's proposal for marriage due to his belief that because she's royalty she would have a rotten personality. However, when he happens upon a mysterious girl who later turns out to be the princess herself, he finds out that she, like Lux, can also see fairies thus finding common ground and leading him to change his mind about the proposal. Together they start building appropriately-sized homes for fairies.

== Publication ==
Written and illustrated by Umetaro Aoi, The Cynical Knight and Gentle Princess: Building Fairy Homes and a Life Together began serialization in Square Enix's shōnen manga magazine on November 10, 2023. Its chapters have been compiled into four tankōbon volumes as of March 2026.

The series' chapters are published in English on Square Enix's Manga Up! Global manga service.

No.	Release date	ISBN
1	May 11, 2024	978-4-7575-9185-1
2	November 12, 2024	978-4-7575-9512-5
3	July 11, 2025	978-4-7575-9951-2
4	March 12, 2026	978-4-301-00383-0

== Reception ==
The series was ranked 10th in the sixth Sanyodo Bookstore Comic Awards in 2025.
