= Love in the Palm of His Hand =

Japanese manga series

- First tankōbon volume cover

カメレオンはてのひらに恋をする。 (Kamereon Hate no Hirani Koi o Suru.)
- Genre: Boys' love
- Manga
- Written by: Teku Rin
- Published by: Square Enix
- English publisher: NA: Square Enix
- Imprint: Gangan Comics BLiss
- Magazine: Gangan BLiss
- Original run: January 1, 2023 – present
- Volumes: 4

Love in the Palm of His Hand (カメレオンはてのひらに恋をする。, Kamereon Hate no Hirani Koi o Suru.) is a Japanese manga series written and illustrated by Teku Rin. It began serialization on NTT Solmare's Comic CMoa website under Square Enix's Gangan BLiss boy's love manga brand in January 2023.

== Synopsis ==
The series is centered around the relationship between struggling actor and third year university student Fujinaga and deaf freshman Keito. Fujinaga was at the brink of giving up acting until he met Keito and saw him perform sign language, and eventually becomes fascinated with it.

== Publication ==
Written and illustrated by Teku Rin, Love in the Palm of His Hand began serialization on NTT Solmare's Comic CMoa website under Square Enix's Gangan BLiss boy's love manga brand on January 1, 2023. Its chapters have been collected in four tankōbon volumes as of February 2026.

The series' chapters are published in English on Square Enix's Manga Up! Global app. During their panel at Anime Expo 2024, Square Enix Manga & Books announced that they would begin releasing volumes of the series in 2025.

No.	Original release date	Original ISBN	North American release date	North American ISBN
1	September 21, 2023	978-4-7575-8751-9	May 20, 2025	978-1-64609-364-9
1. "An Unexpected Meeting"; 2. "Racing Heart"; 3. "The Heat Burning in His Palm"; 4. "Can't Go Back to Being Friends"; 5. "To My Beloved Precious One"; Special side story: "Can't Go Back to Being Friends (Keito's POV)"
2	June 20, 2024	978-4-7575-9261-2	October 7, 2025	978-1-64609-387-8
6. "Kisses and Promises"; 7. "What Keito Observed"; 8. "All of It, Even the Things I Can't See"; 9. "The Same Sounds, the Same Feelings"; Special side story: "I Want to Know More (Keito's POV)"; Special side story: "Keito's Everyday Life"
3	April 22, 2025	978-4-7575-9813-3; 978-4-7575-9814-0 (SE)	April 7, 2026	978-1-64609-460-8
10. "Who's the Most Important to Me"; 11. "Awkward and in Love"; 12. "What Are You Like When You're in Love"; 13. "Say My Name with Your Hands"; Special side story: "Jealousy"
4	February 20, 2026	978-4-301-00335-9	—	—

== Reception ==
The series ranked fifth at the 3rd Late Night Manga Awards in 2024 hosted by Bungeishunjū's Crea magazine.
