= My Ex-Boyfriend Loves Boys' Love! =

Japanese manga series

- First wideban volume cover

元カレが腐男子になっておりまして。 (Motokare ga Fudanshi ni Natte Orimashite)
- Genre: Comedy
- Manga
- Written by: Mugimo
- Published by: Square Enix
- English publisher: NA: Square Enix
- Imprint: Gangan Comics Pixiv
- Magazine: Gangan Pixiv; (January 20, 2018 – January 22, 2022)
- Original run: June 1, 2017 – January 22, 2022
- Volumes: 7

My Ex-Boyfriend Loves Boys' Love (元カレが腐男子になっておりまして。, Motokare ga Fudanshi ni Natte Orimashite) is a Japanese manga series written and illustrated by Mugimo. It was initially serialized on the author's Pixiv account from June 2017 to January 2022. It was later acquired by Square Enix who serialized it on the Pixiv Comic website under its Gangan Pixiv brand from January 2018 to January 2022.

== Plot ==
Momo, a fan of boys' love manga, discovers the same applies to her ex-boyfriend and they renew their relationship because of it.

== Characters ==
Momo Akado (赤土桃, Akado Momo)
Voiced by: Atsumi Tanezaki (drama CD)
Suzuya Katakura (片倉錫也, Katakura Suzuya)
Voiced by: Daisuke Hirose (drama CD)

== Media ==
=== Manga ===
Written and illustrated by Mugimo, My Ex-Boyfriend Loves Boys' Love was initially serialized on the author's Pixiv account from June 1, 2017, to January 22, 2022. It was later acquired by Square Enix who serialized it on the Pixiv Comic website under their Gangan Pixiv brand from January 20, 2018, to January 22, 2022. Its chapters were compiled into seven wideban volumes from January 22, 2018, to April 21, 2022.

The series is published in English on Square Enix's Manga Up! Global app. In February 2026, Square Enix Manga & Books announced that they had licensed the series for English publication, with the first volume set to release in September later in the year.

No.	Original release date	Original ISBN	English release date	English ISBN
1	January 22, 2018	978-4-7575-5611-9	September 8, 2026	979-8-89910-047-5
Chapters 1–7; Chapters 2.5–5.5
2	September 21, 2018	978-4-7575-5850-2	December 15, 2026	979-8-89910-048-2
3	June 22, 2019	978-4-7575-6162-5	—	—
4	February 22, 2020	978-4-7575-6525-8	—	—
5	September 19, 2020	978-4-7575-6850-1	—	—
6	April 21, 2021	978-4-7575-7205-8	—	—
7	April 21, 2022	978-4-7575-7889-0	—	—

=== Other ===
A drama CD adaptation produced by Frontier Works was released on October 15, 2020.

== Reception ==
In 2017, the series was ranked third in the indie category of Pixiv and Nippon Shuppan Hanbai's "Web Manga General Election" contest. In 2018, the series was the second most read series on Pixiv Comic.
