= Demon and Song =

Japanese manga series

- First tankōbon volume cover

悪魔さんとお歌 (Akuma-san to Outa)
- Genre: Dark comedy; Drama; Fantasy
- Manga
- Written by: Makoto Morishita
- Published by: Square Enix
- English publisher: NA: Comikey (digital)
- Imprint: Gangan Comics Pixiv
- Magazine: Gangan Pixiv; Manga Up!
- Original run: September 14, 2019 – October 17, 2020
- Volumes: 2

Demon and Song (悪魔さんとお歌, Akuma-san to Outa; lit. 'Devil and Song') is a Japanese manga series written and illustrated by Makoto Morishita. The manga was first initially release on author's Twitter account from April 2017 to November 2018. It was then serialized in Square Enix's Gangan Pixiv manga website from September 2019 to October 2020, with its chapters collected in two tankōbon volumes as of October 2020.

== Plot ==
After a young boy is abandoned by the demon-slaying Children's Choir for being tone-deaf, a demon reluctantly becomes his caretaker and vocal coach.

== Publication ==
Written and illustrated by Makoto Morishita, Demon and Song initially began its release on author's Twitter account from April 11, 2017, to November 24, 2018. The series was serialized on Square Enix's Gangan Pixiv manga website from September 14, 2019, to October 17, 2020. Square Enix collected its chapters in two tankōbon volumes, released the first on September 21, 2019, and the second on October 22, 2020.

Demon and Song has also been serialized on Square Enix's Manga Up! app in December 2020, and in English on Manga Up! Global from August 2022 to October 2022. The manga is published digitally in English on Kadokawa's BookWalker website, and Comikey has licensed the series in North America.

=== Volume list ===
No.	Japanese release date	Japanese ISBN
1	September 21, 2019	978-4-7575-6274-5
2	October 22, 2020	978-4-7575-6910-2
