= Learning to Love My Cat-like Classmate =

Japanese manga series

- First tankōbon volume cover, featuring Mugi Nekozane (front) and Minato Seno (back)

となりの猫と恋知らず (Tonari no Neko to Koi Shirazu)
- Genre: Romantic comedy
- Manga
- Written by: Akinoko
- Published by: Square Enix
- English publisher: NA: Square Enix (digital) Yen Press
- Imprint: Big Gangan Comics
- Magazine: Monthly Big Gangan; (April 25, 2024 – present)
- Original run: November 21, 2023 – present
- Volumes: 7

Learning to Love My Cat-like Classmate (Japanese: となりの猫と恋知らず, Hepburn: Tonari no Neko to Koi Shirazu), also known as The Deskmate Cat and the Love Novice, is a Japanese manga series written and illustrated by Akinoko. It initially began serialization on the author's Twitter account in November 2023. It later began a parallel serialization in Square Enix's seinen manga magazine Monthly Big Gangan in April 2024.

== Synopsis ==
Minato Seno is a shy and lonely high school student. One day, he is told by his teacher to wake up his classmate Mugi Nekozane from her slumber. He later befriends Nekozane due to their shared interests in cats and photography, and they slowly start to develop feelings for each other.

== Characters ==
Minato Seno (瀬野 湊, Seno Minato)
A first-year high school student. Even though he is shy and introverted, he still hopes to become friends with his classmate sitting next to him, Nekozane. He eventually develops feelings for her.
Mugi Nekozane (猫実 むぎ, Nekozane Mugi)
Voiced by: Tomori Kusunoki (PV)
A first-year high school student. She spends most of the time sleeping and considers cats to be superior beings in the world, showing little interest in humans.

== Publication ==
Written and illustrated by Akinoko, Learning to Love My Cat-like Classmate began serialization on the author's Twitter account on November 21, 2023. It later began a parallel serialization in Square Enix's seinen manga magazine Monthly Big Gangan on April 25, 2024. Its chapters have been compiled into seven tankōbon volumes as of October 2026.

The series is published in English on Square Enix's Manga Up! Global service. During their panel at San Diego Comic-Con 2026, Yen Press announced that they had licensed the series for English publication under the title The Deskmate Cat and the Love Novice.

No.	Original release date	Original ISBN	English release date	English ISBN
1	March 25, 2024	978-4-7575-9126-4	January 26, 2027	979-8-8554-3618-1
Chapters 1–6; Kakioroshi (描き下ろし)
2	April 25, 2024	978-4-7575-9164-6	—	—
Chapters 7–12; Kakioroshi (描き下ろし)
3	October 25, 2024	978-4-7575-9488-3	—	—
Chapters 13–17; Kakioroshi (描き下ろし)
4	April 24, 2025	978-4-7575-9823-2	—	—
Chapters 18–22; Kakioroshi (描き下ろし)
5	October 24, 2025	978-4-301-00131-7	—	—
Chapters 23–27; Kakioroshi (描き下ろし)
6	April 24, 2026	978-4-301-00481-3	—	—
Chapters 28–32; Kakioroshi (描き下ろし)
7	October 23, 2026	978-4-301-00836-1; 978-4-301-00837-8 (SE)	—	—
Chapters 33–37; Kakioroshi (描き下ろし)

== Reception ==
The series was ranked thirteenth in the Nationwide Bookstore Employees' Recommended Comics list of 2025. The series was nominated for the 11th Next Manga Awards in the print category in 2025, and was ranked seventeenth.
