= My Favorite VTuber Is Scary IRL =

Japanese manga series

- First tankōbon volume cover

配達先のお姉さんが怖すぎる (Haitatsu-saki no Onee-san ga Kowa Sugiru)
- Genre: Comedy; Slice of life
- Manga
- Written by: Riyo Yorima
- Published by: Square Enix
- English publisher: NA: Square Enix; Comikey (digital)
- Imprint: Gangan Comics Pixiv
- Magazine: Gangan Pixiv
- Original run: June 8, 2024 – present
- Volumes: 5
- icon

My Favorite VTuber Is Scary IRL (配達先のお姉さんが怖すぎる, Haitatsu-saki no Onee-san ga Kowa Sugiru) is a Japanese manga series written and illustrated by Riyo Yorima. It began publication as a webcomic published on the author's Pixiv account in June 2023. It was later acquired by Square Enix, who began serializing it on the Pixiv Comic website under their Gangan Pixiv brand in June 2024.

== Synopsis ==
The series is centered around an unnamed deliveryman and an unnamed woman with social anxiety. The deliveryman tends to have a hard time having to deliver food to the woman due to her tall, intimidating appearance, but finds solace due to watching streams of Hanae Fuwari, his favorite VTuber. One day, when he arrives at the same woman's apartment, he hears her voice and wonders if it could be the person behind his favorite VTuber. The woman later reaches out to the deliveryman asking him to help her overcome her social anxiety.

== Publication ==
Written and illustrated by Riyo Yorima, My Favorite VTuber Is Scary IRL began publication as a webcomic published on the author's Twitter and Pixiv accounts on June 16, 2023. It was later acquired by Square Enix, who began serializing it on the Pixiv Comic website under their Gangan Pixiv brand on June 8, 2024. Its chapters have been compiled into five tankōbon volumes as of October 2026.

The series is published in English on Square Enix's Manga Up! Global app and website. During their panel at Anime Expo 2025, Square Enix Manga & Books announced that they had licensed the series for English publication beginning in February 2026.

No.	Original release date	Original ISBN	North American release date	North American ISBN
1	June 20, 2024	978-4-7575-9258-2	February 10, 2026	978-1-64609-477-6
1. "My Favorite VTuber Is Scary IRL" (配達先のお姉さんが怖すぎる, Haitatsu-saki no Onee-san ga Kowa Sugiru); 2. "She's Simply Too Powerful" (お姉さんの力が強すぎる, Onee-san no Chikara ga Tsuyosugiru); 3. "Compensating Someone That Way Is Too Scary" (課金の仕方が怖すぎる, Kakin no Shikata ga Kowa Sugiru); 4. "It's Too Soon to Enter Her Home" (家に入るのは急すぎる, Ie ni Hairu no wa Kyū Sugiru); 5. "Her Sense of Personal Space Is Too Nonexistent" (お姉さんとの距離感が近すぎる, Onee-chan to no Kyorikan ga Chika Sugiru); 6. "Her Nighttime Aura Is Too Intimidating" (夜のお姉さんの迫力がありすぎる, Yoru no Onee-san no Hakuryoku ga Ari Sugiru); 7. "Late-Night Shopping at the Corner Store Is Too Challenging" (深夜コンビニでの買い物がムズすぎる, Shinya Konbini de no kaimono ga Muzu Sugiru); Bonus chapters: 1. "It's Been Too Long Since I Spoke to Anyone" (人と話すのが久しぶりすぎる, Hito to Hanasu no ga Hisashiburi Sugiru); 2. "I'm Too Good at Communicating" (わたしのコミュ力が高すぎる, Watashi no Komyuryoku ga Taka Sugiru); 3. "Comments from Chat Are Too Persuasive" (コメントの説得力がありすぎる, Komento no Settokuryoku ga Ari Sugiru); 4. "I've Put Too Much on My Plate" (わたしのごはんが多すぎる, Watashi no Gohan ga Ōsugiru); 5. "He's Too Tactful" (お兄さんが遠慮しすぎる, Onii-san ga Enryo Shisugiru); 6. "Her Going-Out Clothes Are Too Tight" (外に出る服がキツすぎる, Soto ni Deru Fuku ga Kitsu Sugiru); Chapter 0: "Special Feature: The Real World Is Too Scary" (描きおろし リアルの世界が怖すぎる, Kakioroshi Riaru no Sekai ga Kowa Sugiru)
2	January 21, 2025	978-4-7575-9632-0	June 9, 2026	978-1-64609-478-3
8. "It's Too Awkward After Being Mistaken for a Couple" (カップルと間違えられた後が気まずすぎる, Kappuru to Machigae Rareta Nochi ga Kimazu Sugiru); 9. "The New Delivery Girl Is Too Scary" (新しい配達員が怖すぎる, Atarashii Haitatsuin ga Kowa Sugiru); 10. "Going Downtown Is Too Big a Difficulty Spike" (繁華街はハードルが高すぎる, Hankagai wa Hādoru ga Taka Sugiru); 11. "I'm Too Self-Conscious About Her at the Manga Café" (漫画喫茶でお姉さんを意識しすぎる, Manga Kissa de Onee-san o Ishiki Shisugiru); 12. "It's Too Tricky to Pretend I'm Not Here with Her" (お姉さんといるのをごまかすのがムズすぎる, Onee-san to Iru no o Gomakasu no ga Muzu Sugiru); 13. "The Lady I Deliver to Worries Too Much" (配達先のお姉さんが心配すぎる, Haitatsu-saki no Onee-san ga Shinpai Sugiru); Chapter 8.5: "Special Feature: I'm Too Ignorant About His Taste in Clothing" (描きおろしお兄さんの好きな服がわからなすぎる, Kakioroshi Onii-san no Suki na Fuku ga Wakarana Sugiru)
3	July 22, 2025	978-4-7575-9970-3	October 13, 2026	979-8-89910-000-0
14. "There's Too Little Distance Between Me and the Talent Behind My Oshi" (推しの中の人との距離感が近すぎる, Oshi no Naka no Hito to no Kyorikan ga Chika Sugiru); 15. "We're Too Far Removed from the Notion of 'Youth'" (青春とは何かがわからなすぎる, Seishun to wa Nanika ga Wakaranasugiru); 16. "This New Would-Be VTuber Is Too Out-of-Pocket" (新人VTuberの中の人がヤバすぎる, Shinjin VTuber no Naka no Hito ga Yaba Sugiru); 17. "Her in a Maid Costume Is Too Scary" (お姉さんのメイド姿が怖すぎる, Onee-san no Meido Sugata ga Kowa Sugiru); 18. "Riding a Jam-Packed Train with Her Is Too Major a Trial" (お姉さんと乗る満員電車が難関すぎる, Onee-san to Noru Manin Densha ga Nankan Sugiru); Chapter 17.5: "Special Feature: Photo Shoots Are Too Uncomfortable" (描きおろし 写真撮影が苦手すぎる, Kakioroshi Shashin Satsuei ga Nigate Sugiru)
4	March 21, 2026	978-4-301-00406-6	February 9, 2027	979-8-89910-074-1
19. Onee-san to Issho ni Itai Riyū ga Nazo Sugiru (お姉さんと一緒にいたい理由が謎すぎる); 20. Onee-san e no Kimochi ga Afure Sugiru (お姉さんへの気持ちがあふれすぎる); 21. Onee-san no Korabo Aite ga Kodomo Sugiru (お姉さんのコラボ相手が子供すぎる); 22. Haitatsu-saki no Onee-san no Korabo ga Tanan Sugiru (配達先のお姉さんのコラボが多難すぎる); 23. Haitatsu-saki no Onee-san to Issho ni Narita Sugiru (配達先のお姉さんと一緒になりたすぎる); 24. Onee-san to no Shūgakuryokō ga Shinzō ni Waru Sugiru (お姉さんとの修学旅行が心臓に悪すぎる); Chapter 23.5: Kakioroshi Mizume-san to no Kankei ga Kimazu Sugiru (描きおろしミズメさんとの関係が気まずすぎる)
5	October 22, 2026	978-4-301-00826-2	—	—
25. Ojisan to no Aibeya wa Sasuga ni Mazu Sugiru (お姉さんとの相部屋は流石にまずすぎる); 26. Onee-san to Onaji Kūkan ga Kimazu Sugiru (お姉さんと同じ空間が気まずすぎる); 27. Onee-san no Sekkyaku ga Gachi Sugiru (お姉さんの接客がガチすぎる); 28. Onee-san no Baito no Mensetsu ga Jigoku Sugiru (お姉さんのバイトの面接が地獄すぎる); 29. Onee-san no Hatsu Baito ga Tanan Sugiru (お姉さんの初バイトが多難すぎる)
