= On and Off: Work-Life Imbalance =

Japanese manga series

- First wideban volume cover, featuring Soutaro Amada (back) and Akira Hanku (front)

会社と私生活－オンとオフ－ (Kaisha to Shiseikatsu: On to Ofu)
- Genre: Romance; Slice of life
- Manga
- Written by: Shinnosuke Kanazawa
- Published by: Square Enix
- English publisher: NA: Square Enix
- Imprint: Gangan Comics Pixiv
- Magazine: Gangan Pixiv; (December 9, 2023 – present)
- Original run: May 12, 2023 – present
- Volumes: 6
- icon

On and Off: Work-Life Imbalance (Japanese: 会社と私生活－オンとオフ－, Hepburn: Kaisha to Shiseikatsu: On to Ofu) is a Japanese manga series written and illustrated by Shinnosuke Kanazawa. It began publication as a webcomic published on the author's Twitter account in April 2023. It later began serialization on the author's Pixiv account the following month. It was later acquired by Square Enix who began to serialize it on the Pixiv Comic website under their Gangan Pixiv brand in December that same year.

== Synopsis ==
Soutaro Amata and Akira Hanku are employees of the same company with contrasting personalities and reputations; Amata is sociable and considered popular, while Hanku is reserved and considered unapproachable. However, what the two have in common is when they're not working they indulge in the subculture they're most interested in; Amata is interested in lolita fashion, while Hanku is interested in punk fashion. After a chance encounter while indulging in their respective favorite fashion, the two become friends and then almost immediately learn about each other's identity.

== Publication ==
Written and illustrated by Shinnosuke Kanazawa, On and Off: Work-Life Imbalance initially began publication as a webcomic published on the author's Twitter account on April 25, 2023. It later began serialization on the author's Pixiv account on May 12, 2023. It was later acquired by Square Enix who began to serialize it on the Pixiv Comic website under their Gangan Pixiv brand on December 9, 2023. Its chapters have been compiled into six wideban volumes as of November 2026.

The series is published in English on Square Enix's Manga Up! Global website and app. During their panel at Anime Expo 2024, Square Enix Manga & Books announced that they would begin releasing volumes of the series in 2025.

No.	Original release date	Original ISBN	North American release date	North American ISBN
1	December 21, 2023	978-4-7575-8969-8	June 3, 2025	978-1-64609-367-0
1. "My Cute Work-Life Balance"; 2. "My Cool Work-Life Balance"; 3. "In Each Other's Orbits"; 4. "Unexpected Contact"; 5. "Plans to Meet Again"; 6. "The Rendezvous"
2	June 20, 2024	978-4-7575-9256-8	September 16, 2025	978-1-64609-390-8
7. "My Buddy Tamotsu"; 8. "My Weird Work-Life Balance"; 9. "A Maiden's Pure Heart"; 10. "Return to Happiness"; 11. "Little Mitsu"; 12. "After Work"; Special Chapter: "Finding Punk Rock"
3	January 21, 2025	978-4-7575-9630-6; 978-4-7575-9631-3 (SE)	March 17, 2026	978-1-64609-447-9
13. "Resolve"; 14. "Realization"; 15. "Inkling"; 16. "Normal"; 17. "Outing"; 18. "Hanku's Place"; Special Chapter: "Meeting Little Mitsu"
4	June 20, 2025	978-4-7575-9924-6	November 3, 2026	979-8-8991-0001-7
19. "Trio"; 20. "Their Relationships"; 21. "Confirming Feelings"; 22. "From Now On"; 23. "Obon Plans"; Special Chapter: "What Is Love?"; Special Chapter: "What Will Amata Do?"
5	March 21, 2026	978-4-301-00404-2; 978-4-301-00405-9 (SE)	—	—
6	November 20, 2026	978-4-301-00895-8	—	—

== Reception ==
The series was nominated for the tenth Next Manga Awards in the web category, and ranked 18th. It was also nominated for the eleventh and twelfth edition in the same category, with it being ranked tenth in 2026. The series was ranked sixth in AnimeJapan's "Manga We Want to See Animated" poll in 2026.
