= Overpowered and Underpaid: An OP Swordmaster Turns Hit Streamer =

Japanese light novel series

- First light novel volume cover

社畜剣聖、配信者になる ～ブラックギルド会社員、うっかり会社用回線でS級モンスターを相手に無双するところを全国配信してしまう～ (Shachiku Kensei, Haishin-sha ni Naru: Burakku Girudo Kaishain, Ukkari Kaisha-yō Kaisen de S-kyū Monsutā o Aite ni Musō Suru Tokoro o Zenkoku Haishin Shite Shimau)
- Genre: Adventure, fantasy
- Novel series
- Written by: Genkotsu Kumano
- Published by: Shōsetsuka ni Narō; Kakuyomu
- Original run: May 13, 2023 – present
- Light novel
- Written by: Genkotsu Kumano
- Illustrated by: Ryūshi Tajima
- Published by: Square Enix
- Imprint: SQEX Novel
- Original run: January 6, 2024 – present
- Volumes: 6
- Manga
- Written by: Genkotsu Kumano
- Illustrated by: Jojo Ueyama
- Published by: Square Enix
- English publisher: NA: Square Enix
- Imprint: Gangan Comics UP!
- Magazine: Manga Up!
- Original run: June 7, 2024 – present
- Volumes: 4

Overpowered and Underpaid: An OP Swordmaster Turns Hit Streamer (社畜剣聖、配信者になる ～ブラックギルド会社員、うっかり会社用回線でS級モンスターを相手に無双するところを全国配信してしまう～, Shachiku Kensei, Haishin-sha ni Naru: Burakku Girudo Kaishain, Ukkari Kaisha-yō Kaisen de S-kyū Monsutā o Aite Musō Suru Tokoro o Zenkoku Haishin Shite Shimau) is a Japanese light novel series written by Genkotsu Kumano and illustrated by Ryūshi Tajima. It began serialization as a web novel on Shōsetsuka ni Narō and Kakuyomu in May 2023. It was later acquired by Square Enix who began publishing the series under their SQEX Novel imprint in January 2024. A manga adaptation illustrated by Jojo Ueyama began serialization on Square Enix's Manga Up! manga service in June 2024.

== Synopsis ==
Makoto Tanaka is an overworked employee of a black guild. He dives into dungeons, and records his activities as private streams as part of his work. However, one day while working he accidentally sets his stream to public and becomes a viral sensation overnight. Upon finding out about his new found fame, he is advised by one of his friends to quit his job with the guild to become a full-time streamer.

== Media ==
=== Light novel ===
Written by Genkotsu Kumano, Overpowered and Underpaid: An OP Swordmaster Turns Hit Streamer began serialization as a web novel on Shōsetsuka ni Narō and Kakuyomu on May 13, 2023. It was later acquired by Square Enix who began publishing the series with illustrations by Ryūshi Tajima under their SQEX Novel light novel imprint on January 6, 2024. Six volumes have been released as of September 7, 2026.

| No. | Release date | ISBN |
|---|---|---|
| 1 | January 6, 2024 | 978-4-7575-9000-7 |
| 2 | June 7, 2024 | 978-4-7575-9238-4 |
| 3 | December 6, 2024 | 978-4-7575-9561-3 |
| 4 | July 7, 2025 | 978-4-7575-9946-8 |
| 5 | February 6, 2026 | 978-4-301-00315-1 |
| 6 | September 7, 2026 | 978-4-301-00749-4 |

=== Manga ===
A manga adaptation illustrated by Jojo Ueyama began serialization on Square Enix's Manga Up! manga service on June 7, 2024. The manga's chapters have been compiled into four tankōbon volumes as of October 2026.

The manga's chapters are published in English on Square Enix's Manga Up! Global app. During their panel at Anime Expo 2026, Square Enix Manga & Books announced that they had licensed the manga for English publication, with the first volume set to release in April 2027.

| No. | Original release date | Original ISBN | English release date | English ISBN |
|---|---|---|---|---|
| 1 | December 6, 2024 | 978-4-7575-9549-1 | April 13, 2027 | 979-8-8991-0092-5 |
| 2 | July 7, 2025 | 978-4-7575-9936-9 | — | — |
| 3 | February 6, 2026 | 978-4-301-00309-0 | — | — |
| 4 | October 7, 2026 | 978-4-301-00743-2 | — | — |

== Reception ==
The manga adaptation won the "Exhilarating Battle Manga Award" in the Isekai Division of the 2025 Renta Manga Awards.
