= Perfectly Fine on My Own, So My Fiancé Can Twist in the Wind =

Japanese web novel series

- First tankōbon volume cover of the manga adaptation

おひとり様には慣れましたので。 婚約者放置中！ (Ohitori-sama ni wa Naremashita node, Konyakusha Hōchi-chū!)
- Genre: Fantasy; Romantic comedy
- Novel series
- Written by: Yahiro Arase
- Published by: Shōsetsuka ni Narō
- Original run: December 14, 2022 – December 22, 2022
- Manga
- Written by: Yahiro Arase
- Illustrated by: Jun Hareta
- Published by: Ichijinsha
- English publisher: NA: Kodansha USA
- Magazine: Comic Lake
- Original run: March 29, 2024 – present
- Volumes: 4

Perfectly Fine on My Own, So My Fiancé Can Twist in the Wind (おひとり様には慣れましたので。 婚約者放置中！, Ohitori-sama ni wa Naremashita node, Konyakusha Hōchi-chū!) is a Japanese web novel series written by Yahiro Arase. It was serialized on Shōsetsuka ni Narō in December 2022. A manga adaptation illustrated by Jun Hareta began serialization on the Pixiv Comic website under Ichijinsha's Comic Lake label in March 2024.

== Premise ==
Noble young lady Nicole has had her heart broken more times that she can count. Her fiancé Keios ignores her, and is attentive to his childhood friend Princess Caroline. Tired of waiting around and conforming to his needs, Nicole decides their marriage will be white and that she'd be content doing things on her own.

As a twist, Keios is just as sympathetic; he alienated Nicole out of sheer stupidity. It became a habit of his to spend his free time with Carolina, who used to be a tomboy; forgetting he was trying to figure out how to act with a proper lady like Nicole. Even Carolina is exasperated by Keios' lack of awareness that he destroyed the love he wanted.

== Publication ==
Written by Yahiro Arase, Perfectly Fine on My Own, So My Fiancé Can Twist in the Wind was serialized on Shōsetsuka ni Narō between December 14 and 22, 2022. A manga adaptation illustrated by Jun Hareta began serialization on the Pixiv Comic website under Ichijinsha's Comic Lake brand on March 29, 2024. The manga's chapters have been compiled into four tankōbon volumes as of May 2026.

During their panel at Anime Expo 2025, Kodansha USA announced that they had licensed the manga for English publication beginning in Q2 2026.

No.	Original release date	Original ISBN	English release date	English ISBN
1	July 26, 2024	978-4-7580-1917-0	March 3, 2026	978-1-6472-9559-2
1. "No More Expectations"; 2. "Carefree Days"; 3. "A Beautiful Spring, Defiled"; 4. "Misunderstandings and Missteps"; 5. "In Hindsight"; Bonus Story: "How It All Began"
2	January 31, 2025	978-4-7580-1962-0	May 12, 2026	978-1-6472-9596-7
6. "Further Misunderstandings"; 7. "A Dog Would Be Preferable"; 8. "Ideals and Reality"; 9. "A New Path"; 10. "I'm Perfectly Fine On My Own"; Bonus Story: "Wonderful Life On My Own"; Extra: "After-Hours Lessons in Love and Ladies"
3	September 26, 2025	978-4-7580-8775-9	August 11, 2026	978-1-6472-9634-6
10.5. "In His Defense"; 11. "Prejudice and Promise"; 12. "Who I Was Then, Who I Am Now"; 13. "Secret Lessons"; 14. "A Love Left Behind"; Bonus Story: "In Any Dress"; Extra: "Please Don't Read This On Your Own"
4	May 29, 2026	978-4-7580-9869-4	—	—

== Reception ==
The series was ranked seventeenth in the 2025 edition of Takarajimasha's Kono Manga ga Sugoi! guidebook for the best manga for female readers. The series topped the Nationwide Bookstore Employees' Recommended Comics list of 2025. The series was ranked 3rd in the sixth Sanyodo Bookstore Comic Awards in 2025. The series, alongside The Princess Groom, won the Women's Comic Prize at the 2026 Digital Comic Awards. The series won the grand prize of the 2026 EbookJapan Manga Award.
