= Unwinding with the Aloof Girl at the Standing Bar =

Japanese web novel series

- First tankōbon volume cover of the manga adaptation

立ち飲み居酒屋でクーデレダウナー系女子大生が隣に来る話 (Tachinomi Izakaya de Kuudere Daunā-kei Joshidaisei ga Tonari ni Kuru Hanashi)
- Genre: Romantic comedy
- Novel series
- Written by: Sorinokoshi
- Published by: Kakuyomu
- Original run: March 31, 2024 – present
- Manga
- Written by: Sorinokoshi
- Illustrated by: Taichi Ōkubo
- Published by: Square Enix
- English publisher: NA: Square Enix
- Imprint: Gangan Comics Up!
- Magazine: Manga Up!
- Original run: August 22, 2025 – present
- Volumes: 2

Unwinding with the Aloof Girl at the Standing Bar (立ち飲み居酒屋でクーデレダウナー系女子大生が隣に来る話, Tachinomi Izakaya de Kuudere Daunā-kei Joshidaisei ga Tonari ni Kuru Hanashi) is a Japanese web novel series written by Sorinokoshi. It began serialization on Kadokawa Corporation's Kakuyomu website in March 2024. A manga adaptation illustrated by Taichi Ōkubo began serialization on Square Enix's Manga Up! manga website in August 2025.

== Synopsis ==
Seiya Tonami is an office worker who routinely gets drinks at his favorite standing bar on Fridays. One day, he helps out a female college student named Ryou Himi from unwanted sexual advances, and they end up becoming drinking buddies.

== Publication ==
Written by Sorinokoshi, Unwinding with the Aloof Girl at the Standing Bar began serialization on Kadokawa Corporation's Kakuyomu website on March 31, 2024. A manga adaptation illustrated by Taichi Ōkubo began serialization on Square Enix's Manga Up! manga website on August 22, 2025. The manga's chapters have been compiled into two tankōbon volumes as of June 2026.

The series' chapters are published in English on Square Enix's Manga Up! Global app.

No.	Release date	ISBN
1	February 6, 2026	978-4-301-00310-6
2	June 5, 2026	978-4-301-00560-5

== Reception ==
The series was ranked 20th in the web category at the twelfth Next Manga Awards in 2026.
