= The Princess Groom =

Japanese light novel series

- First light novel volume cover

ベル・プペーのスパダリ婚約～「好みじゃない」と言われた人形姫、我慢をやめたら皇子がデレデレになった。実に愛い！ (Beru Pupē no Supadari Konyaku: "Konomi ja nai" to Iwareta Ningyō Hime, Gaman o Yametara Ōji ga Deredere ni Natta. Jitsu ni Ui!)
- Genre: Romantic fantasy
- Novel series
- Written by: Asaki Asagiri
- Published by: Shōsetsuka ni Narō
- Original run: January 1, 2023 – April 3, 2023
- Light novel
- Written by: Asaki Asagiri
- Illustrated by: selen
- Published by: Square Enix
- Imprint: SQEX Novel
- Original run: March 7, 2024 – present
- Volumes: 1
- Manga
- Written by: Asaki Asagiri
- Illustrated by: selen
- Published by: Square Enix
- English publisher: NA: Square Enix
- Imprint: Gangan Comics UP!
- Magazine: Manga Up!
- Original run: October 28, 2024 – present
- Volumes: 2

The Princess Groom (ベル・プペーのスパダリ婚約～「好みじゃない」と言われた人形姫、我慢をやめたら皇子がデレデレになった。実に愛い！, Beru Pupē no Supadari Konyaku: "Konomi ja nai" to Iwareta Ningyō Hime, Gaman o Ōji ga Deredere ni Natta. Jitsu ni Ui!) is a Japanese light novel series written by Asaki Asagiri and illustrated by selen. It was originally serialized as a web novel on Shōsetsuka ni Narō between January and April 2023. It was later acquired by Square Enix who began releasing it under their SQEX Novel imprint in March 2024. A manga adaptation also illustrated by selen began serialization on Square Enix's Manga Up! manga service in October 2024.

== Plot ==
Leticia Orlesian is the daughter of a duke who is admired for her doll-like appearance, deep blue eyes, and silver hair. Nicknamed "the Belle Poupée", she is engaged to the second prince Gilbert, who is said to be cursed. When the two meet, Leticia is excited but Gilbert is not thrilled, treating her coldly initially. However, unbeknownst to most people, Leticia is actually a skilled magician with ice powers and can also change her appearance to that of a man. When Gilbert gets attacked by thugs, Leticia defends him and vows to protect him in the future.

== Media ==
=== Light novel ===
Written by Asaki Asagiri, The Princess Groom was originally serialized as a web novel on Shōsetsuka ni Narō from January 1, to April 3, 2023. It was later acquired by Square Enix who are releasing the series with illustrations by selen under their SQEX Novel light novel imprint. A single volume has been released as of March 7, 2024.

No.	Release date	ISBN
1	March 7, 2024	978-4-7575-9090-8

=== Manga ===
A manga adaptation also illustrated by selen began serialization on Square Enix's Manga Up! manga service on October 28, 2024. The manga's chapters have been compiled into two tankōbon volumes as of October 2025.

The manga's chapters are published in English on Square Enix's Manga Up! Global app. In February 2026, Square Enix Manga & Books announced that they had licensed the manga for English publication, with the first volume set to release in August 2026.

No.	Original release date	Original ISBN	English release date	English ISBN
1	February 6, 2025	978-4-7575-9656-6	August 4, 2026	978-1-64609-497-4
1. "The True Face of the Beautiful Doll"; 2. "My Darling Husband"
2	October 7, 2025	978-4-301-00097-6	January 5, 2027	979-8-89910-036-9

== Reception ==
The series won the gold prize at Square Enix's 1st SQEX Novel Award in 2023.

The manga adaptation was ranked 21st in Da Vinci's 2025 Book of the Year ranking. The manga topped the Nationwide Bookstore Employees' Recommended Comics list of 2026. The manga, alongside Perfectly Fine on My Own, So My Fiancé Can Twist in the Wind, won the Women's Comic Prize at the 2026 Digital Comic Awards.
