= Teacher, We Will Destroy the World! =

Japanese manga series

- First tankōbon volume cover

先生！ 僕たちが世界を滅ぼします (Sensei, Boku-tachi ga Sekai o Horoboshimasu)
- Genre: Fantasy
- Manga
- Written by: Kina Kobayashi
- Published by: Square Enix
- English publisher: NA: Square Enix
- Imprint: Gangan Comics UP!
- Magazine: Manga Up!
- Original run: November 26, 2022 – present
- Volumes: 10

Teacher, We Will Destroy the World! (先生！ 僕たちが世界を滅ぼします, Sensei, Boku-tachi ga Sekai o Horoboshimasu) is a Japanese manga series written and illustrated by Kina Kobayashi. It began serialization on Square Enix's Manga Up! manga service in November 2022.

== Synopsis ==
The series is centered around an unnamed assassin who goes by Mr. Zero. He's a top ranked assassin in his association, and has been assigned a task to take out targets involved in the magic school, Orion Academy. He disguises himself as a teacher named Solo Pastry who is then assigned to supervise Class 2-D, a class of underperforming or dysfunctional students. It proves to be a more challenging task than he had imagined. Solo later finds out that the students in Class 2-D are his targets, and the task requires him to kill all of them in a practice known as "egg-smashing" to rid the future of "evil wizards". Solo is against this practice and saves a student in Class 2-D from their mistake, and is told that his actions changed the future. Solo decides to take his role as a fake teacher seriously to save the students and prevent a bad future.

== Characters ==
Solo Pastry (ソロ・ペイストリー, Soro Peisutorī) / No. 0
A top-ranked assassin from Chronos who disguises himself as a teacher in order to find his target in Orion Academy. Once he finds out that his targets are the students in class 2-D, he goes against this and saves a student from their mistake and in doing so changes the future.
He was born into an abusive household, never went to school as a child, and was later abandoned by his mother. Afterwards, he was taken in by Chronos.
Ibuki Brown (イブキ・ブラウン, Ibuki Buraun)
An underling from the Magic Bureau who is a big fan of No. 0. He disguises himself as a transfer student to provide assistance to No. 0.
Miiko Cecilia (ミーコ・セシリア, Mīko Seshiria)
An underperforming student in Class 2-D who specializes in transformation magic.
Xiao Shahar (シャオ・シャヘル, Shao Shaharu)
A high-performing student in Class 2-D who specializes in wind magic. He also suffers from survivor's guilt over the loss of his childhood friend. He's also fascinated with cats, and ironically scared of mice.
Totory Leander (トトリー・レアンデール, Totorī Reandēru)
An underperforming student in Class 2-D who specializes in plant magic. She was raised on a farm and intends on taking care of it once she graduates from school. She is childhood friends with Rex.
Rex Red (レックス・レッド, Rekkusu Reddo)
A high-performing student who is a beastman. He's childhood friends with Totory and it's been hinted that he has feelings for her.
Kai Alvern (カイ・アルヴァーン, Kai Aruvuān)
A student who enjoys cooking as a hobby.
Azu Merci (アズ・メルシィ, Azu Merushī)
An underperforming student in Class 2-D who has an obsession with potions.
Dante Dalton (ダンテ・ダルトン, Dante Daruton)
A student who has an inferiority complex with regards to his classmate Xiao.
Panni Rau (パニー・ラウ, Panī Rau)
A high-performing student in Class 2-D who prefers partying than studying.
Noel Campbell (ノエル・キャンベル, Noeru Kyanberu)
An underperforming student in Class 2-D who has chūnibyō.
Nanato Mikazuki (ナナト・ミカヅキ)
A student who's friends with Noel.
Cattleya Berry (カトレア・ベリー, Katorea Berī)
A high-performing student who is known for her physical strength, but prefers to appear ladylike.
Nagisa Snow (ナギサ・スノー, Nagisa Snow)
A mysterious student in Class 2-D who's known to sleep in class and not much else.

== Production ==
Kina Kobayashi had always wanted to create a series that combined her interest in fantasy with school settings. After discussions with her editor, they settled on a magic school setting for the series. She also wanted to show the growth Solo displays as he helps his students overcome their problems.

== Publication ==
Written and illustrated by Kina Kobayashi, Teacher, We Will Destroy the World began serialization on Square Enix's Manga Up! manga service on November 26, 2022. Its chapters have been compiled into ten tankōbon volumes as of October 2026.

The series' chapters are published in English on Square Enix's Manga Up! Global app.

No.	Release date	ISBN
1	February 7, 2023	978-4-7575-8396-2
2	July 6, 2023	978-4-7575-8652-9
3	December 7, 2023	978-4-7575-8947-6
4	May 7, 2024	978-4-7575-9179-0
5	October 7, 2024	978-4-7575-9460-9
6	February 6, 2025	978-4-7575-9662-7
7	July 7, 2025	978-4-7575-9942-0
8	December 5, 2025	978-4-301-00212-3
9	May 7, 2026	978-4-301-00506-3
10	October 7, 2026	978-4-301-00796-8

== See also ==
- Nameless Asterism, another manga series by the same creator
