= Assassin & Cinderella =

Japanese manga series

- First tankōbon volume cover

アサシン&シンデレラ (Asashin & Shinderera)
- Genre: Romance
- Manga
- Written by: Yuzo Natsuno
- Published by: Square Enix
- English publisher: NA: Square Enix
- Imprint: Gangan Comics Online
- Magazine: Gangan Online
- Original run: August 22, 2022 – present
- Volumes: 6

Assassin & Cinderella (アサシン&シンデレラ, Asashin & Shinderera) is a Japanese manga series written and illustrated by Yuzo Natsuno. It began serialization on Square Enix's Gangan Online manga website in August 2022.

== Plot ==
Neneko is a spy on a mission to seduce Omi, an assassin who works for an enemy organization. Having figured out her true motive, Omi proposes marriage to prevent Neneko's employer from learning that she failed to deceive him.

== Characters ==
Neneko Sato (佐藤 寧々子, Satō Neneko)
Voiced by: Saori Ōnishi (voice comic)
Omi Amai (甘井 緒臣, Amai Omi)
Voiced by: Yūichirō Umehara (voice comic)

== Media ==
=== Manga ===
Written and illustrated by Yuzo Natsuno, Assassin & Cinderella began serialization on Square Enix's Gangan Online manga website on August 22, 2022. Its chapters have been collected into six tankōbon volumes as of August 2026.

The series is published in English on Square Enix's Manga Up! Global app. During their panel at Anime Expo 2024, Square Enix Manga & Books announced that they would begin releasing volumes of the series in English in March 2025.

==== Volumes ====
No.	Original release date	Original ISBN	North American release date	North American ISBN
1	February 10, 2023	978-4-7575-8409-9	March 11, 2025	978-1-64609-349-6
Chapters 1–4; Bonus
2	September 12, 2023	978-4-7575-8796-0	September 2, 2025	978-1-64609-350-2
Chapters 5–9; Bonus
3	May 11, 2024	978-4-7575-9189-9	March 3, 2026	978-1-64609-351-9
Chapters 10–13; Bonus
4	January 10, 2025	978-4-7575-9616-0	October 6, 2026	978-1-64609-443-1
5	October 10, 2025	978-4-301-00118-8	January 12, 2027	979-8-89910-021-5
6	August 10, 2026	978-4-301-00707-4; 978-4-301-00708-1 (SE)	—	—

=== Other ===
In commemoration of the release of the series' third volume on May 11, 2024, a voice comic adaptation was released on the Square Enix Japanese YouTube channel that same day. It featured the voices of Yūichirō Umehara and Saori Ōnishi.

== Reception ==
The series was nominated for the ninth Next Manga Awards in the web category.
