= The Otaku Love Connection =

Japanese manga series

- First tankōbon volume cover

オタクも恋も連鎖する (Otaku mo Koi mo Rensa Suru)
- Genre: Romantic comedy
- Manga
- Written by: Chiyu Amairo
- Published by: Square Enix
- English publisher: NA: Square Enix
- Imprint: Gangan Comics Pixiv
- Magazine: Gangan Pixiv
- Original run: April 8, 2023 – present
- Volumes: 5
- icon

The Otaku Love Connection (オタクも恋も連鎖する, Otaku mo Koi mo Rensa Suru) is a Japanese manga series written and illustrated by Chiyu Amairo. It initially began publication as a webcomic on the author's Twitter account in June 2022. It was later acquired by Square Enix who began serializing it on the Pixiv Comic website under their Gangan Pixiv brand in April 2023.

== Plot ==
Wataru Otonari is a high school student who ships two students in his classroom, Yuzuru Kakoi and Chihiro Kawai, because of their beauty. Wataru later encounters people who share the same ship as him, albeit from different points of view.

== Publication ==
Written and illustrated by Chiyu Amairo, The Otaku Love Connection began publication as a webcomic on the author's Twitter account on June 18, 2022. It was later acquired by Square Enix who began serializing it on the Pixiv Comic website under their Gangan Pixiv brand on April 8, 2023. Its chapters have been compiled into five tankōbon volumes as of July 2026.

The series is published in English on Square Enix's Manga Up! Global app and website. During their panel at Anime Expo 2024, Square Enix Manga & Books announced that they had licensed the series for English publication beginning in February 2025.

No.	Original release date	Original ISBN	North American release date	North American ISBN
1	April 21, 2023	978-4-7575-8481-5	February 11, 2025	978-1-64609-369-4
Chapters 1–10
2	November 21, 2023	978-4-7575-8909-4	June 10, 2025	978-1-64609-370-0
Chapters 11–19
3	July 22, 2024	978-4-7575-9277-3	October 21, 2025	978-1-64609-391-5
Chapters 20–25; Bonus
4	June 20, 2025	978-4-7575-9910-9	May 19, 2026	978-1-64609-492-9
Chapters 26–29; Bonus
5	July 22, 2026	978-4-3010-0648-0	—	—

== Reception ==
The English release translation of the series by minami won the Japan Society and Anime NYC's second American Manga Award for Best Translation in 2025.
