= Nameless Asterism =

Japanese manga series

- First tankōbon volume cover

ななしのアステリズム (Nanashi no Asterism)
- Genre: Romance, slice of life, yuri
- Manga
- Written by: Kina Kobayashi
- Published by: Square Enix
- English publisher: NA: Seven Seas Entertainment
- Magazine: Gangan Online
- Original run: 2015 – 2017
- Volumes: 5

Nameless Asterism (Japanese: ななしのアステリズム, Hepburn: Nanashi no Asterism) is a Japanese yuri manga written and illustrated by Kina Kobayashi. It was serialized online via Square Enix's Gangan Online website from 2015 to 2017, and is licensed for English-language release by Seven Seas Entertainment.

== Synopsis ==
Tsukasa, Nadeshiko, and Mikage have been best friends since they began junior high, however Tsukasa she has been keeping secret for almost a year; she has a crush on Nadeshiko. Not wanting to disrupt the group, Tsukasa resigns to keep her crush a secret but the situation becomes more complex when she discovers that Nadeshiko actually has a crush on Mikage. Tsukasa struggles with her desire to support her friend as it conflicts with her own feelings. All the while Mikage too has a secret of her own that she can't share with anyone.

== Characters ==
Tsukasa Shiratori

The series protagonist, Tsukasa is a cheerful girl who does not want anything to change in her current friendship group. This has become a problem for her as she has developed a crush on Nadeshiko. She also has a twin brother.

Nadeshiko Washio

Tsukasa and Mikage's best friend. She is caught by Tsukasa trying to kiss Mikage while she is asleep, revealing that she has a crush on Mikage. Tsukasa promises support her with this crush.

Mikage Kotooka

Tsukasa and Nadeshiko's best friend. She enjoys making sweets and often bakes treats for Tsukasa and Nadeshiko. She often quickly begins dating and then breaks up with boys to the point of her relationships not being seen as serious by her friends.

== Media ==
=== Manga ===
No.	Original release date	Original ISBN	English release date	English ISBN
1	March 25, 2016	9784757548626	February 13, 2018	978-1-626927-44-5
2	March 25, 2016	9784757549357	May 1, 2018	978-1-626927-45-2
3	June 22, 2016	9784757550124	October 23, 2018	978-1-626928-92-3
4	November 22, 2016	9784757551541	September 24, 2019	978-1-626929-50-0
5	April 22, 2017	9784757553217	April 28, 2020	978-1-642750-97-3

== Reception ==
Nameless Asterism generally received positive reviews. Otaku USA recommended the first volume, praising its strong start and noting that "drama arises naturally and nothing feels forced." Anime News Network gave volume's 1 and 2 an overall B+ rating, noting that the series was off to good start and that it really understood its characters and setting, as well as praising the Kina Kobayashi for avoiding melodrama as they "shows a clear understanding of the fact that what seems ridiculous in hindsight at the time is actually of the utmost importance."

In 2019, it was included in the Young Adult Library Services Association's list of "Great Graphic Novels for Teens".

== See also ==
- Teacher, We Will Destroy the World!, another manga series by the same creator
