= Haimiya Is Scary Cute =

Japanese manga series

- First tankōbon volume cover, featuring Mio Haimiya

灰宮先輩は怖くてかわいい (Haimiya-senpai wa Kowakute Kawaii)
- Genre: Romantic comedy
- Manga
- Written by: Sumu Kamiyama
- Published by: Square Enix
- English publisher: NA: Square Enix
- Imprint: Gangan Comics Up!
- Magazine: Manga Up!
- Original run: November 6, 2025 – present
- Volumes: 4

Haimiya Is Scary Cute (Japanese: 灰宮先輩は怖くてかわいい, Hepburn: Haimiya-senpai wa Kowakute Kawaii; lit. 'Haimiya-senpai Is Scary but Cute') is a Japanese manga series written and illustrated by Sumu Kamiyama. It was originally posted as a series of illustrations on Kamiyama's X and Pixiv accounts, before beginning serialization in Square Enix's Manga Up! web service in November 2025. The series has been compiled in four tankōbon volumes as of November 2026.

== Plot ==
Ao Kurose, a member of the health committee, gains the attention of his upperclassman Mio Haimiya. Haimiya, who has a flashy gyaru-like appearance, is infamous in school for having a scary demeanor. However, Haimiya gradually cultivates a remarkably friendly and genuine interest toward him given that he is employed within the infirmary and furthermore has been assigned there from the very beginning. Kurose, having no other friends and spending his days helping out at the infirmary, he develops an authentic bond with Haimiya, with the two becoming friends. With time, Kurose finds himself falling in love with Haimiya.These two embark upon quite an extraordinary adventure as the primary question arises whether these two people might eventually become one romantically or if their paths may be split instead.

== Characters ==
Ao Kurose (黒瀬 蒼, Kurose Ao)
A high school student and a member of the health committee. He has an introverted personality, leading to him not being a member of any clubs nor having any friends. However, he gains the attention of his fellow health committee member Haimiya, who sheds her usual scary personality whenever he is with her. As they bond, Kurose finds himself falling in love with her, though at first, he doesn't understand it. He has an older sister and a younger sister. He was previously interested in music but quit over high expectations. He later joins a band at school.
Mio Haimiya (灰宮 美桜, Haimiya Mio)
Voiced by: Yūko Natsuyoshi (PV)
Kurose's upperclassman and a fellow member of the health committee. She has a reputation in school due to her scary aura but with her gyaru like appearance. However, she really is a kind and caring girl with a good heart, and acts especially sweet around Kurose. Soon enough Haimiya manages to make friends alongside Kurose, and eventually, she develops feelings for him as well. She speaks bluntly with a Kansai dialect that makes her even more intimidating, and is seen as someone who looks down on others and often even as a delinquent.
Ms. Aya (あや先生, Aya-sensei)
The school nurse, whom Kurose and Haimiya help with.She is also a supporter in the cute bond with Haimiya and Kurose.
Sora Kurose (黒瀬 そら, Kurose Sora)
Kurose's 20-year-old older sister.
Umi Kurose (黒瀬 うみ, Kurose Umi)
Kurose's 14-year-old younger sister. Played a pivotal role in changing the outlook for Kurose.
Touya Tanzaki (丹崎 搭弥, Tanzaki Tōya)
Kurose's classmate and a member of the basketball club. Despite being seatmates, the two had barely interacted prior to a certain incident. However, the two become friends after Kurose offered him a sandwich. After the two become friends, Haimiya becomes jealous of their relationship, something Kurose does not notice.
Shiu Koyuki (紫羽 小雪, Koyuki Shiu)
She’s a classmate of Haimiya whose personality completely revolves around cute things. Being totally obsessed with them, she picks Haimiya and blackmails her into working in her place at a daycare. However, Koyuki soon confesses that she actually wants to get closer to her. Out of deep empathy for Haimiya's frequent absences, Koyuki had secretly been leaving her motivating sticky notes. Thanks to Koyuki’s earlier helpful actions and heartfelt compliments, Haimiya looks past the complicated scheme, and the two eventually become genuine friends.
Shiu Mashiro (紫羽 真白, Mashiro Shiu)
Koyuki Shiu's little brother, At the daycare, Mashiro initially acts as a massive troublemaker who loves to tease and provoke Haimiya. He pushes her buttons constantly, testing her patience despite her intimidating looks. However, as the arc unfolds, he realizes that his own struggles with his family and with attending school,perfectly mirrors Haimiya's history of skipping classes. Upon discovering this shared vulnerability,Haimiya changes his outlook by telling her own experience and how she manages to break out of it,which the kindred spirit in Haimiya plays a pivotal role in transforming his outlook. Mashiro softens up and sincerely apologizes to her. The two form a deeply sweet, empathetic bond rooted in mutual understanding.

== Development ==
Sumu Kamiyama originally planned to create a one-shot manga featuring a senior and an underclassman. In the original draft, Kurose was the upperclassman while Haimiya was a junior, and Haimiya was intended to be male. However, being unsatisfied with the draft, Kamiyama swapped their roles, with Haimiya now being female and the senior, and Kurose being the underclassman. Kamiyama gave Haimiya a Kansai dialect because they saw Kansai women as tough, but also because the Kansai dialect had a reputation for being intimidating. They also wanted Haimiya to have the contrast between being intimidating and cute, with the dialect itself adding to that feeling.

== Publication ==
Kamiyama originally began posting the series as a webcomic on their X and Pixiv accounts on May 14, 2025. After going viral on social media, it was picked up for serialization by Square Enix, which began serializing it on their Manga Up! web service on November 6, 2025. The first tankōbon volume was published on February 6, 2026; Four volumes have been released as of November 2026. A promotional video featuring Yūko Natsuyoshi as Haimiya was posted on YouTube to coincide with the volume's release.

The series is published in English on Square Enix's Manga Up! Global app and website.

| No. | Release date | ISBN |
|---|---|---|
| 1 | February 6, 2026 | 978-4-301-00313-7 |
| 2 | May 7, 2026 | 978-4-301-00508-7 |
| 3 | August 6, 2026 | 978-4-301-00692-3 |
| 4 | November 6, 2026 | 978-4-301-00866-8; 978-4-301-00867-5 (SE) |

== Reception ==
The series was ranked third in the web category at the twelfth Next Manga Awards in 2026.
