= Not Quite Love =

Japanese manga series

- First tankōbon volume cover

恋と呼ぶにはささやかですが (Koi to Yobu ni wa Sasayaka Desu ga)
- Genre: Romance
- Manga
- Written by: Daisuke Hagiwara
- Published by: Square Enix
- English publisher: NA: Square Enix Manga & Books
- Imprint: Gangan Comics
- Magazine: Monthly Shōnen Gangan
- Original run: October 10, 2025 – present
- Volumes: 2

Not Quite Love (Japanese: 恋と呼ぶにはささやかですが, Hepburn: Koi to Yobu ni wa Sasayaka Desu ga) is a Japanese manga series written and illustrated by Daisuke Hagiwara. It began serialization in Square Enix's shōnen manga magazine Monthly Shōnen Gangan in October 2025.

== Synopsis ==
High school student Umi Sayama suddenly moves into the household of her neighbors, the Hiroi family. While there she reunites with her childhood crush Shoya, who is eight years her senior, after seven years. When she gets to meet him, she discovers that Shoya's appearance has changed drastically from when she last saw him, and that he also works as an erotic manga artist.

== Publication ==
Written and illustrated by Daisuke Hagiwara, Not Quite Love began serialization in Square Enix's shōnen manga magazine Monthly Shōnen Gangan on October 10, 2025. Its chapters have been compiled into two tankōbon volumes as of September 2026.

During their panel at Anime Expo 2026, Square Enix Manga & Books announced that they had licensed the series for English publication, with the first volume set to release in April 2027.

No.	Original release date	Original ISBN	North American release date	North American ISBN
1	March 12, 2026	978-4-301-00390-8	April 6, 2027	979-8-8991-0093-2
2	September 11, 2026	978-4-301-00758-6	—	—

== Reception ==
The series was ranked eighth in the print category at the twelfth Next Manga Awards in 2026.
