= YanOta: The Delinquent and the Otaku =

Japanese manga series

- First tankōbon volume cover

ヤンキーショタとオタクおねえさん (Yankī Shota to Otaku Onē-san)
- Genre: Romantic comedy
- Manga
- Written by: Yumi Hoshimi
- Published by: Square Enix
- English publisher: NA: Square Enix
- Imprint: Gangan Comics Online
- Magazine: Gangan Online
- Original run: September 26, 2016 – present
- Volumes: 7

YanOta: The Delinquent and the Otaku (ヤンキーショタとオタクおねえさん, Yankī Shota to Otaku Onē-san) is a Japanese manga series written and illustrated by Yumi Hoshimi. It began serialization on Square Enix's Gangan Online manga website in September 2016.

== Synopsis ==
Kazuko Saeki is an office worker who is also an otaku for 2D boys' love and shotacon content. However, she is not good at dealing with men in real life, and becomes frightened when she comes across Ryūō Aikawa, a young yankī boy with a intimidating appearance. Unbeknownst to her, Ryūō has strong romantic feelings for Kazuko.

== Character ==
Kazuko Saeki (佐伯かづ子, Saeki Kazuko)
Voiced by: Yoko Hikasa (drama CD)
Ryūō Aikawa (愛川龍桜, Aikawa Ryūō)
Voiced by: Mutsumi Tamura (drama CD)
Tomomi Tomoda (巴田智美, Tomoda Tomomi)
Voiced by: Mayumi Shintani (drama CD)
Shizuka Otohana (乙花静, Otohana Shizuka)
Voiced by: Mikako Komatsu (drama CD)
Rinko Himeno (姫野りんこ, Himeno Rinko)
Voiced by: Nao Tōyama (drama CD)
Panpanman (パンパンマン)
Voiced by: Kishō Taniyama (drama CD)
Rui (ルイ)
Voiced by: Ayumu Murase (drama CD)

== Media ==
=== Manga ===
Written and illustrated by Yumi Hoshimi, YanOta: The Delinquent and the Otaku began serialization on Square Enix's Gangan Online manga website on September 26, 2016. Its chapters have been compiled into seven tankōbon volumes as of July 2022.

The series' chapters were published in English on Crunchyroll Manga from September 2018, up until the app's closure in December 2023.

No.	Release date	ISBN
1	March 22, 2017	978-4-7575-5281-4
2	July 22, 2017	978-4-7575-5409-2
3	January 22, 2018	978-4-7575-5593-8
4	August 22, 2018	978-4-7575-5833-5
5	March 22, 2019	978-4-7575-6058-1
6	February 22, 2020	978-4-7575-6457-2; 978-4-7575-6458-9 (SE)
7	July 22, 2022	978-4-7575-8038-1

=== Other ===
A drama CD adaptation was released on January 31, 2018. It featured performances from Mutsumi Tamura, Yoko Hikasa, Mikako Komatsu, Mayumi Shintani, Yū Shimamura, Yuri Amano, Kishō Taniyama, Nao Tōyama, Ayumu Murase, and Yamato Kinjo.

== Reception ==
The series was ranked seventh in the web category at the 3rd Next Manga Awards in 2017. It was also ranked sixth in the Web Manga General Election in 2017.
