= Exquisite Blood: The Heretic Onmyoji =

Japanese manga series

- First tankōbon volume cover, featuring Fuzuki

雅血の陰陽師 (Miyabichi no Onmyōji)
- Genre: Adventure; Fantasy; Supernatural
- Manga
- Written by: Sakura Fujimoto
- Published by: Square Enix
- English publisher: NA: Square Enix Manga & Books
- Imprint: G Fantasy Comics
- Magazine: Monthly GFantasy
- Original run: November 18, 2021 – present
- Volumes: 9

Exquisite Blood: The Heretic Onmyoji (Japanese: 雅血の陰陽師, Hepburn: Miyabichi no Onmyōji) is a Japanese manga series written and illustrated by Sakura Fujimoto. It has been serialized in Square Enix's shōnen manga magazine Monthly GFantasy since November 2021, with its chapters collected in nine tankōbon volumes as of September 2026.

== Premise ==
In an ancient and fantastical world, a world of chaos where evil spirits abound. a time when demons roam about disasters all over the land and coexist with humans in an era where chaos has spread everywhere. the ten sacred items (Jingi) of the emperor, which were kept secretly in the Mikado's Treasury, have been stolen by demons, and in order to return the ten sacred items, the emperor calls the strongest onmyoujis in the country, those who exorcise them and vow to be loyal to mikado they are called onmyouji. Fuzuki, from the black castle, an onmyouji known as The Heretic. a man whose reputation for occult practices has spread everywhere and everyone is afraid of him enters into an extremely tough battle with demons along with Hakuro, in search of the first Jingi, he encounters a young boy named Ranmaru who is half-demon, half-human, rejected by everyone around him and who is at the center of the chaos.

== Characters ==
Fuzuki (文月)
An onmyoji who is considered a heretic and shunned. He uses a technique that uses his own blood.
Hakuro (白露)
A swordsman who has animal characteristics such as ears and tail of a dog(?) who easily wields a long sword and works with Fuzuki as his subordinate.
Ranmaru (嵐丸)
Itachi's half-demon child. A Jingi entered his head.

== Publication ==
Written and illustrated by Sakura Fujimoto, Miyabichi no Onmyouji was serialized in Square Enix's shōnen manga magazine Monthly GFantasy since November 18, 2021. (Note: It started in the magazine's December issue of 2021 (cover date November 27), which was released on November 18.) Square Enix has collected its chapters into individual tankōbon volumes. The first volume was released on June 27, 2022. As of September 26, 2026, nine volumes have been released.

In October 2024, Square Enix Manga & Books announced that they had licensed the manga for English release in North America, starting in August 2025. In France, the manga is licensed by Doki-Doki.

=== Volumes ===
No.	Original release date	Original ISBN	English release date	English ISBN
1	June 27, 2022	978-4-7575-7994-1	August 12, 2025	978-1-64609-409-7
2	November 26, 2022	978-4-7575-8279-8	November 11, 2025	978-1-64609-410-3
3	June 27, 2023	978-4-7575-8629-1	February 10, 2026	978-1-64609-411-0
4	March 27, 2024	978-4-7575-9128-8	September 15, 2026	978-1-64609-412-7
5	July 26, 2024	978-4-7575-9318-3	May 11, 2027	978-1-64609-413-4
6	March 27, 2025	978-4-7575-9773-0	—	—
7	August 27, 2025	978-4-7575-9980-2	—	—
8	March 26, 2026	978-4-301-00419-6	—	—
9	September 26, 2026	978-4-301-00781-4	—	—

== Reception ==
Manga Sanctuary describes Fujimoto's manga as a mixture of fantasy and Japanese folklore, finds the revelations about the main character interesting, a well-paced narrative, lovable characters, and fairly exceptional in design, and praises the drawings and fights, describing them as well mastered and dynamic. Manga News considers the manga story to be very classic and praises the designs and main characters of the manga, and stating that "we are facing the beginning of a series that does not seek originality at all, but is sufficiently scribbled, rhythmic and equipped with sufficiently attractive elements."

The manga was nominated for the tenth Next Manga Award in the print category in 2024.
