= Witch Life in a Micro Room =

Japanese manga series

- First tankōbon volume cover

六畳一間の魔女ライフ (Rokujō Hitoma no Majo Life)
- Genre: Fantasy comedy
- Manga
- Written by: Akitaka
- Published by: Square Enix
- English publisher: NA: Yen Press
- Magazine: Monthly Gangan Joker
- Original run: February 22, 2020 – June 22, 2022
- Volumes: 5

Witch Life in a Micro Room (六畳一間の魔女ライフ, Rokujō Hitoma no Majo Life) is a Japanese manga series written and illustrated by Akitaka. It was serialized in Square Enix's Monthly Gangan Joker magazine from February 2020 to June 2022.

== Synopsis ==
The series is centered around Madge and Ririka, two C-class witches who live in a one-room apartment. The duo work together for insufficient pay, but continue dreaming of living better lives for each other.

== Publication ==
Written and illustrated by Akitaka, A Witch's Life in a Micro Room was initially published as a one-shot in Square Enix's Monthly Gangan Joker magazine on March 22, 2019. It was later serialized in the same magazine from February 22, 2020, to June 22, 2022. Its chapters were compiled into five tankōbon volumes from September 19, 2020, to August 22, 2022.

During their panel at Anime Expo 2023, Yen Press announced that they licensed the series for English publication.

No.	Original release date	Original ISBN	North American release date	North American ISBN
1	September 19, 2020	978-4-7575-6775-7	January 23, 2024	978-1-9753-7422-8
1. "Madge and Ririka"; 2. "Our Way"; 3. "Acting Wishy-Washy Again"
2	November 21, 2020	978-4-7575-6952-2	May 21, 2024	978-1-9753-7424-2
4. "We're a Team, So"; 5. "Both of Us!!"; 6. "Just for Today"; 7. "It's About Trying Your Very Best"; 8. "You Two Make a Good Team"
3	May 21, 2021	978-4-7575-7261-4	August 20, 2024	978-1-9753-7426-6
9. "I Don't Want to Lose That"; 10. "I'm Leaving This to You, Okay?"; 11. "No Fair"; 12. "I'm Sure It'll Work Out"; 13. "Let's Fly the Shout of Victory"
4	January 21, 2022	978-4-7575-7692-6	February 18, 2025	978-1-9753-7428-0
14. "Disband!?"; 15. "We Decided To Go With MadgRika"; 16. "You Just Wanted Praise"; 17. "Aloella's Big Adventure 1"; 18. "Aloella's Big Adventure 2"
5	August 22, 2022	978-4-7575-8085-5	August 26, 2025	978-1-9753-7430-3
19. "MadgRika!!"; 20. "Aloella's Secret 1"; 21. "Aloella's Secret 2"; 22. "A Real Ancient Witch...!?"; 23. "Doesn't That Just Get You Excited !?"; 24. "Believe in Your Own Passion"; 25. "I'm Here for You"; 26. "So Brilliant"; 27. "Madge and Ririka"

== Reception ==
The series was nominated for the eighth Next Manga Awards in the print category.

== See also ==
- Miss Miyazen Would Love to Get Closer to You, another manga series by the same author
