= Fenrir (manga) =

Japanese manga series

- First tankōbon volume cover

フェンリル (Fenriru)
- Genre: Historical
- Manga
- Written by: Chūgaku Akamatsu
- Illustrated by: Mioko Onishi
- Published by: Square Enix
- English publisher: NA: Comikey
- Magazine: Monthly Big Gangan
- Original run: August 25, 2018 – November 25, 2021
- Volumes: 4

Fenrir (Japanese: フェンリル, Hepburn: Fenriru) is a Japanese manga series based on a novel by Chūgaku Akamatsu and illustrated by Mioko Onishi. It was serialized in Square Enix's seinen manga magazine Monthly Big Gangan from August 2018 to November 2021, with its chapters collected in four tankōbon volumes.

== Plot ==
The manga is set in 12th-century Mongolia. The Mongols are divided in several tribes and Temjin, whose father is the chief of the Kiyat clan, meets a mysterious girl by chance. Their meeting will affect the whole world.

== Characters ==
=== Main ===
- Temjin (テムジン, Temujin): The son of a chieftain of the Kiyat; he works hard and has a kind heart.
- Behter (ベクテル, Bekuteru): He is the half brother of Temjin. Behter is elected the new chief of his and his brother's clan.
- Börte (ボルテ, Borute): Temjin's love interest and future wife. She is from the Ongirat tribe.

== Publication ==
Fenrir is based on an original novel by Chūgaku Akamatsu and illustrated by Mioko Onishi. It was serialized in Square Enix's seinen manga magazine Monthly Big Gangan from August 25, 2018, to November 25, 2021. Square Enix collected its chapters in four tankōbon volumes, released from November 25, 2019, to January 25, 2022.

In November 2021, Comikey announced that they licensed the series for English publication.
