= List of Umineko When They Cry chapters =

The cover of the first volume of the Umineko: When They Cry manga released by Gangan Comics on June 21, 2008, in Japan.

The manga series Umineko When They Cry is written by Ryukishi07 and illustrated by six different manga artists working separately on different story arcs based on the Umineko: When They Cry visual novel series by 07th Expansion. The first manga, an adaptation of Legend of the Golden Witch illustrated by Kei Natsumi, began serialization in Square Enix's Gangan Powered magazine in the January 2008 issue. After Gangan Powered was discontinued, the manga was transferred to Square Enix's Monthly Gangan Joker magazine with the debut May 2009 issue, and continued until the publication of the September 2009 issue. Jirō Suzuki drew the adaptation of Turn of the Golden Witch which was serialized between the August 2008 and October 2010 issues of Square Enix's GFantasy. The manga adaptation of Banquet of the Golden Witch is illustrated by Kei Natsumi and was serialized between the October 2009 and July 2011 issues of Gangan Joker. Sōichirō drew the adaptation of Alliance of the Golden Witch, which was serialized in Square Enix's Internet-based magazine Gangan Online between October 1, 2009, and February 2, 2012.

The manga adaptation of End of the Golden Witch is illustrated by Akitaka and was serialized between the November 2010 and December 2012 issues of Gangan Joker. Hinase Momoyama drew the adaptation of Dawn of the Golden Witch, which was serialized between the December 2010 and December 2012 issues of GFantasy. The manga adaptation of Requiem of the Golden Witch is illustrated by Eita Mizuno and started serialization in the May 2011 issue of Square Enix's Monthly Shōnen Gangan. The manga adaptation of Twilight of the Golden Witch is drawn by Kei Natsumi and started serialization in the February 2012 issue of Gangan Joker. A manga titled Umineko: When They Cry Tsubasa, illustrated by Fumi Itō, began serialization in Square Enix's Young Gangan Big on June 25, 2011 and concluded in Big Gangan on April 25, 2013. Four tankōbon volumes of Legend of the Golden Witch were released in Japan between June 2008 and December 2009 under Square Enix's Gangan Comics imprint. 53 volumes have been released over the entire series. Yen Press licensed the series and began releasing omnibuses of two or three volumes in December 2012, and continued releasing these omnibuses mostly every three or four months until June 2020.

== Volume list ==
=== Legend of the Golden Witch ===
No.	Original release date	Original ISBN	English release date	English ISBN
1 (1)	June 21, 2008	978-4-7575-2309-8	November 20, 2012	978-0-316-22916-6
1. "Rokkenjima" (六軒島); 2. "The Legend of the Witch" (魔女伝説, Majo Densetsu); 3. "The Golden Witch" (黄金の魔女, Ōgon no Majo); 4. "The Golden Epitaph" (黄金の碑文, Ōgon no Hibun); 5. "Letter From a Witch" (魔女からの手紙, Majo Kara no Tegami)
2 (1)	December 22, 2008	978-4-7575-2445-3	November 20, 2012	978-0-316-22916-6
6. "The Eternal Promise" (永遠の約束, Eien no Yakusoku); 7. "The First Night 1" (第一の晩①, Daiichi no Ban Ichi); 8. "The First Night 2" (第一の晩②, Daiichi no Ban Ni); 9. "The Witch's Sacrifices" (魔女の生贄, Majo no Ikenie); 10. "Witch without a Form" (姿なき魔女, Sugatanaki Majo)
3 (2)	June 22, 2009	978-4-7575-2589-4	February 26, 2013	978-0-316-22950-0
11. "The Invisible Witch" (見えざる魔女, Miezaru Majo); 12. "Eva vs. Natsuhi" (絵羽 VS 夏妃, Eba VS Natsuhi); 13. "Battler vs. Eva" (戦人 VS 絵羽, Batora VS Eba); 14. "The Second Night 1" (第2の晩①, Daini no Ban Ichi); 15. "The Second Night 2" (第2の晩②, Daini no Ban Ni); 16. "Kanon vs. Beatrice" (嘉音VS魔女, Kanon VS Beatorīche)
4 (2)	December 22, 2009	978-4-7575-2752-2	February 26, 2013	978-0-316-22950-0
17. "Chessboard Logic" (チェス盤思考, Chesuban Shikō); 18. "Confinement" (籠城, Rōjō); 19. "Separation" (離散, Risan); 20. "Discord" (不和, Fuwa); 21. "Golden Land" (黄金郷, Ōgonkyō); 22. "Tea Party —Episode 1—" (お茶会, Ochakai); 23. "Secret Tea Party —????—" (裏お茶会, Ura Ochakai)

=== Turn of the Golden Witch ===
No.	Original release date	Original ISBN	English release date	English ISBN
1 (3)	June 22, 2009	978-4-7575-2590-0	May 28, 2013	978-0-316-22951-7
1. "A Dream at the Bottom of the Water" (水の底で見る夢, Mizu no Soko de Miru Yume); 2. "Furniture" (家具, Kagu); 3. "Witch" (魔女, Majo); 4. "Seals" (刻印, Kokuin); 5. "Love" (恋, Koi); 6. "Something Unseen" (視えない、もの。, Mienai, Mono.)
2 (3)	December 22, 2009	978-4-7575-2763-8	May 28, 2013	978-0-316-22951-7
7. "School Festival" (学園祭, Gakuensai); 8. "Rejection" (拒絶, Kyozetsu); 9. "Mother & Daughter" (母娘, Hahako); 10. "The Battle Begins" (開戦, Kaisen); 11. "The Little Witch" (小さき魔女, Chiisaki Majo); 12. "Submission" (屈服, Kuppuku)
3 (3)	April 22, 2010	978-4-7575-2854-3	May 28, 2013	978-0-316-22951-7
13. "Chessboard Logic" (チェス盤理論, Chesuban Riron); 14. "The Devil's Proof 1" (悪魔の証明, Akuma no Shōmei); 15. "The Devil's Proof 2" (悪魔の証明 2, Akuma no Shōmei Ni); 16. "Happy Halloween for Maria."; 17. "Furniture's Blade" (家具の刃, Kagu no Yaiba); 18. "New Rule" (新しいルール, Atarashii Rūru)
4 (4)	August 21, 2010	978-4-7575-2974-8	August 20, 2013	978-0-316-22952-4
19. "Battler's Counterattack" (戦人反撃, Batora Hangeki); 20. "The Wolves and Sheep Riddle" (狼と羊のパズル, Ōkami to Hitsuji no Pazuru); 21. "Vanishing Remains" (遺体消失, Itai Shōshitsu); 22. "Unreaching Red" (届かぬ赤, Todokanu Aka); 23. "Spirit Mirror" (霊鏡, Reikyō)
5 (4)	December 22, 2010	978-4-7575-3099-7	August 20, 2013	978-0-316-22952-4
24. "An Eternal Promise" (永遠の誓い, Eien no Chikai); 25. "Act Close" (終劇, Shūgeki); 26. "Feast" (宴, Utage); 27. "Tea Party —Episode 2—" (お茶会, Ochakai); 28. "Secret Tea Party —????—" (裏お茶会, Ura-ochakai)

=== Banquet of the Golden Witch ===
No.	Original release date	Original ISBN	English release date	English ISBN
1 (5)	April 22, 2010	978-4-7575-2855-0	January 21, 2014	978-0-316-36903-9
1. "The Endless Witch" (無限の魔女, Mugen no Majo); 2. "Welcome Home" (おかえり, Okaeri); 3. "The Devil's Proof" (悪魔の証明, Akuma no Shōmei); 4. "Tenacity" (執念, Shūnen); 5. "Confession" (告白, Kokuhaku)
2 (5)	August 21, 2010	978-4-7575-2975-5	January 21, 2014	978-0-316-36903-9
6. "Kuwadorian" (九羽鳥庵); 7. "Furniture vs. Seven Sisters" (家具VS七杭, Kagu VS Nanakui); 8. "Magical Battle" (魔法大戦, Mahō Taisen); 9. "Victory Conditions" (勝利条件, Shōri Jōken)
3 (5)	December 22, 2010	978-4-7575-3100-0	January 21, 2014	978-0-316-36903-9
10. "Wish Fulfillment" (悲願成就, Higan Jōju); 11. "Succession Ceremony" (継承式, Keishō-shiki); 12. "Separation" (決別, Ketsubetsu); 13. "A Woman's Jealousy" (女の嫉妬, Onna no Shitto)
4 (6)	April 22, 2011	978-4-7575-3205-2	April 22, 2014	978-0-316-37041-7
14. "New Furniture" (新しき家具, Atarashiki Kagu); 15. "Resurrection Magic" (反魂魔法, Hangon Mahō); 16. "Internal Collapse" (内部崩壊, Naibu Hōkai); 17. "The True Endless Witch" (真なる無限の魔女, Shin Naru Mugen no Majo)
5 (6)	August 22, 2011	978-4-7575-3336-3	April 22, 2014	978-0-316-37041-7
18. "Battler vs. Eva" (戦人 VS エヴァ, Batora VS Eva); 19. "Red Truth" (赤き真実, Akaki Shinjitsu); 20. "An Uninvited Guest" (招かれざる客, Manekarezaru Kyaku); 21. "Tea Party —Episode 3—" (お茶会, Ochakai); 22. "Secret Tea Party —????—" (裏お茶会, Ura-ochakai)

=== Alliance of the Golden Witch ===
No.	Original release date	Original ISBN	English release date	English ISBN
1 (7)	April 22, 2010	978-4-7575-2856-7	July 22, 2014	978-0-316-37042-4
1. "One-Winged Eagle" (独羽の鷲, Ichiwa no Washi); 2. "Magic" (魔法, Mahō); 3. "It Is the One Element" (それは一なる元素, Sore wa Ichi Naru Genso); 4. "Truth Is Like a Kaleidoscope" (真実は万華鏡のように, Shinjitsu wa Mangekyō no Yō ni)
2 (7)	August 21, 2010	978-4-7575-2976-2	July 22, 2014	978-0-316-37042-4
5. "Beatrice" (ベアトリーチェ, Beatorīche); 6. "Mariage Sorciere" (マリアージュ・ソルシエール, Mariāju Sorushiēru); 7. "Two Butterflies" (二羽の蝶, Niwa no Chō); 8. "The Miracle of Magic" (魔法の奇跡, Mahō no Kiseki); 9. "Reunion" (再開, Saikai)
3 (8)	December 22, 2010	978-4-7575-3101-7	October 28, 2014	978-0-316-37043-1
10. "Opening" (開幕, Kaimaku); 11. "Mother" (母, Haha); 12. "The End of the Daydream" (白昼夢の終わり, Hakuchūmu no Owari); 13. "Sakutarou" (さくたろう, Sakutarō); 14. "The First Night" (第一の晩, Daiichi no Ban)
4 (8)	April 22, 2011	978-4-7575-3206-9	October 28, 2014	978-0-316-37043-1
15. "Evil" (魔, Ma); 16. "Future Heir" (次期当主, Jiki Tōshu); 17. "Absolute Determination" (絶対の決意, Zettai no Ketsui); 18. "Battle" (攻防, Kōbō)
5 (9)	August 22, 2011	978-4-7575-3337-0	January 20, 2015	978-0-316-37044-8
19. "The End of the Feast" (宴の終焉, Gishiki no Shūen); 20. "Mission" (使命, Shimei); 21. "Sin" (罪, Tsumi); 22. "Battler Ushiromiya?" (右代宮ばトラ?, Ushiromiya Batora?)
6 (9)	April 21, 2012	978-4-7575-3555-8	January 20, 2015	978-0-316-37044-8
23. "It Can't Be Seen Without Love" (愛がなければ視えな, Ai ga Nakereba Mienai); 24. "Black and White" (白と黒, Shiro to Kuro); 25. "Conclusion" (決着, Kecchaku); 26. "Ange Ushiromiya" (右代宮 縁寿, Ushiromiya Enje); 27. "Tea Party —Episode 4— Part 1" (お茶会EP4-Tea party-前編, Ochakai EP4 Tea party Zenpen); 28. "Tea Party —Episode 4— Part 2" (お茶会EP4-Tea party-後編, Ochakai EP4 Tea party Kōhen); 29. "Secret Tea Party —????—" (裏お茶会-???-, Ura-ochakai)

=== End of the Golden Witch ===
No.	Original release date	Original ISBN	English release date	English ISBN
1 (10)	April 22, 2011	978-4-7575-3207-6	May 19, 2015	978-0-316-30224-1
1. "Promise" (約束, Yakusoku); 2. "The Magic of Resurrection" (反魂の魔法, Hangon no Mahō); 3. "A Proper Mystery" (正式なミステリー, Seishiki na Misuterī); 4. "Storm Clouds" (暗雲, An'un); 5. "The Visitor" (訪問者, Hōmonsha)
2 (10)	December 22, 2011	978-4-7575-3452-0	May 19, 2015	978-0-316-30224-1
6. "Detective" (探偵, Tantei); 7. "Epitaph" (碑文, Hibun); 8. "The Arrivers" (辿り着きし者, Tadoritsukishi Mono); 9. "Tears" (涙, Namida); 10. "Ring" (指輪, Yubiwa); 11. "A Game for Two" (二人のゲーム, Futari no Gēmu)
3 (11)	April 21, 2012	978-4-7575-3556-5	September 22, 2015	978-0-316-34585-9
12. "The First Night" (第一の晩, Daiichi no Ban); 13. "Detective's Privilege" (探偵権限, Tantei Kengen); 14. "The Tenfold Witch-Piercing Wedge 1" (魔女を貫く十の楔①, Majo o Tsuranuku Jū no Kusabi Ichi); 15. "The Tenfold Witch-Piercing Wedge 2" (魔女を貫く十の楔②, Majo o Tsuranuku Jū no Kusabi Ni); 16. "The Tenfold Witch-Piercing Wedge 3" (魔女を貫く十の楔③, Majo o Tsuranuku Jū no Kusabi San)
4 (11)	August 22, 2012	978-4-7575-3700-2	September 22, 2015	978-0-316-34585-9
17. "Conclusion" (決着, Kecchaku); 18. "Deduction and Inspection" (推理と検証, Suiri to Kenshō); 19. "Closet" (クローゼット, Kurōzetto); 20. "Checkmate" (チェックメイト, Chekkumeito)
5 (12)	December 22, 2012	978-4-7575-3825-2	January 26, 2016	978-0-316-34586-6
21. "Different Truths 1" (異なる真実, Kotonaru Shinjitsu); 22. "Different Truths 2" (異なる真実（2）, Kotonaru Shinjitsu Ni); 23. "Court Dismissed" (閉廷, Heitei)
6 (12)	December 22, 2012	978-4-7575-3826-9	January 26, 2016	978-0-316-34586-6
24. "Confession" (告白, Kokuhaku); 25. "Tea Party —Episode 5—" (お茶会-EP5 Tea party-, Ochakai EP5 Tea party); 26. "Secret Tea Party —????— Part 1" (裏お茶会-???-（1）, Ura-ochakai Ichi); 27. "Secret Tea Party —????— Part 2" (裏お茶会-???-（2）, Ura-ochakai Ni)

=== Dawn of the Golden Witch ===
No.	Original release date	Original ISBN	English release date	English ISBN
1 (13)	August 22, 2011	978-4-7575-3342-4	May 24, 2016	978-0-316-34587-3
1. "The Sixth Game" (第6のゲーム, Dairoku no Gēmu); 2. "Fledgling" (雛, Hina); 3. "Confession" (告白, Kokuhaku); 4. "Beato's Existence" (ベアトの存在, Beato no Sonzai)
2 (13)	December 22, 2011	978-4-7575-3453-7	May 24, 2016	978-0-316-34587-3
5. "The Wedges of Blue Truth" (青き真実の楔, Aoki Shinjitsu no Kusabi); 6. "As Each Grows" (それぞれの成長, Sorezore no Seichō); 7. "A Different Interpretation of Magic" (別の解釈の魔法, Betsu no Kaishaku no Mahō); 8. "Trial of Lovers" (愛し合う者たちの試練, Aishiau Monotachi no Shiren)
3 (14)	April 21, 2012	978-4-7575-3557-2	September 27, 2016	978-0-316-34589-7
9. "Opening" (幕開け, Makuake); 10. "Absolute Will" (絶対の意思, Zettai no Ishi); 11. "The Hell of Love" (恋の地獄, Koi no Jigoku); 12. "Two in One" (二人で一人, Futari de Hitori)
4 (14)	August 22, 2012	978-4-7575-3701-9	September 27, 2016	978-0-316-34589-7
13. "Detective's Privileges and the Premise of Magic" (探偵権限と魔法の前提, Tantei Kengen to Mahō no Zentei); 14. "Battle of Red and Blue" (赤と青のバトル, Aka to Ao no Batoru); 15. "Arrogance and a Trap" (驕りと罠, Ogori to Wana); 16. "A Tiny Seam" (小さな綻び, Chiisana Hokorobi)
5 (15)	December 22, 2012	978-4-7575-3827-6	January 24, 2017	978-0-316-34590-3
17. "Battler's Counter" (戦人の応手, Batora no Ōshu); 18. "The Skirmish over Battler's Disappearance" (戦人消失を巡る攻防, Batora Shōshitsu o Meguru Kōbō); 19. "Erika's Trap" (ヱリカの罠, Erika no Wana); 20. "The Prize for Victory" (勝利へのご褒美, Shōri e no Gohōbi)
6 (15)	December 22, 2012	978-4-7575-3828-3	January 24, 2017	978-0-316-34590-3
21. "Ceremony and a Duel" (婚儀と決闘, Kongi to Kettō); 22. "Into One...." (ひとつに…。, Hitotsu ni....); 23. "Detective's Pride" (探偵のプライド, Tantei no Puraido); 24. "Conclusion" (決着, Kecchaku); 25. "Tea Party —Episode 6—" (お茶会, Ochakai); 26. "Secret Tea Party —????—" (裏お茶会-???-, Ura-ochakai)

=== Requiem of the Golden Witch ===
No.	Original release date	Original ISBN	English release date	English ISBN
1 (16)	December 22, 2011	978-4-7575-3454-4	December 19, 2017	978-0-316-41189-9
1. "Invitation to the Game" (ゲームへの招待, Gēmu e no Shōtai); 2. "Beatrice's Portrait" (べアトりーチェの肖像, Beatorīche no Shōzō); 3. "The Right to Spectate" (観劇者権限, Kangekisha Kengen); 4. "Kinzou's Confession" (金蔵の告白, Kinzō no Kokuhaku); 5. "Encounter on Rokkenjima" (六軒島の出会い, Rokkenjima no Deai); 6. "Submarine's Payload" (潜水艦の積荷, Sensuikan no Tsumini); 7. "Bargaining" (駆け引き, Kakehiki); 8. "Gold and Madness" (黄金と狂気, Ōgon to Kyōki)
2 (16)	August 22, 2012	978-4-7575-3702-6	December 19, 2017	978-0-316-41189-9
9. "Golden Magic" (黄金の魔法, Ōgon no Mahō); 10. "The Game Resumes" (ゲーム再開, Gēmu Saikai); 11. "Maria the Witch" (魔女マリア, Majo Maria); 12. "Will's Theory" (ウィルの考察, Wiru no Kōsatsu); 13. "Jessica's Confession" (朱志香の告白, Jeshika no Kokuhaku); 14. "The Witch in the V.I.P. Room" (貴賓室の魔女, Kihinshitsu no Majo)
3 (16)	December 22, 2012	978-4-7575-3829-0	December 19, 2017	978-0-316-41189-9
15. "Two Testimonies" (二つの証言, Futatsu no Shōgen); 16. "Will's Hypothesis" (ウィルの推理, Wiru no Suiri); 17. "The Identity of Lion Ushiromiya" (右代宮理御の正体, Ushiromiya Rion no Shōtai); 18. "The Beginning of Everything" (すべての始まり, Subete no Hajimari); 19. "A New Life" (新しい生活, Atarashii Seikatsu); 20. "The Culprit's Birth" (犯人の出生, Hannin no Shusshō)
4 (17)	August 22, 2013	978-4-7575-4044-6	April 10, 2018	978-0-316-44698-3
21. "Yasu and the Witch" (ヤスと魔女, Yasu to Majo); 22. "Interactions with the Witch" (魔女との交流, Majo to no Kōryū); 23. "Changing Days" (移り変わる日常, Utsuri Kawaru Nichijō); 24. "Witch Magic" (魔女の魔法, Majo no Mahō); 25. "Witch Manifestation" (魔女顕現, Majo Kengen)
5 (17)	December 21, 2013	978-4-7575-4175-7	April 10, 2018	978-0-316-44698-3
26. "The Golden Paradise" (黄金の理想郷, Ōgon no Risōkyō); 27. "An Answer Sought" (求めた答え, Motometa Kotae); 28. "Witch and Battler" (魔女と戦人, Majo to Batora); 29. "The Time of Tribulation" (試練の時, Shiren no Toki); 30. "At the End of the Trial" (試練の果てに, Shiren no Hate ni)
6 (17)	April 22, 2014	978-4-7575-4274-7	April 10, 2018	978-0-316-44698-3
31. "Shoots of Love" (恋の芽, Koi no Me); 32. "The Secret of the Epitaph" (碑文の謎, Hibun no Nazo); 33. "Attempting the Epitaph" (碑文への挑戦, Hibun e no Chōsen); 34. "The Answer" (解明, Kaimei); 35. "The Day of Fate" (運命の日, Unmei no Hi)
7 (18)	August 22, 2014	978-4-7575-4388-1	July 24, 2018	978-0-316-44703-4
36. "The Witch Returns" (魔女復活, Majo Fukkatsu); 37. "The End of the Witch's Fantasy" (魔女幻想の終焉, Majo Gensō no Shūen); 38. "Eternal Sleep" (永遠の眠り, Towa no Nemuri); 39. "The End of the Game, and Then..." (ゲーム閉幕、そして…。, Gēmu Heimaku, Soshite...)
8 (18)	December 22, 2014	978-4-7575-4496-3	July 24, 2018	978-0-316-44703-4
40. "A Different Story's First Day of Slaughter" (異なる展開、惨劇の初日へ, Kotonaru Tenkai, Sangeki no Shonichi e); 41. "The Witch's Murder Plot" (魔女の殺人計画, Majo no Satsujin Keikaku); 42. "The Gold's Magical Power" (黄金の魔力, Ōgon no Maryoku); 43. "Rudolf and Kyrie" (留弗夫と霧江, Rudorufu to Kirie)
9 (18)	April 22, 2015	978-4-7575-4608-0	July 24, 2018	978-0-316-44703-4
44. "Accelerating Tragedy" (加速する惨劇, Kasokusuru Sangeki); 45. "In the End, the Survivor..." (決着、生き残るのは…, Kecchaku, Ikinokoru no wa...); 46. "What Happened That Day" (あの日起った事, Ano Hi Okotta Koto); 47. "Inescapable Fate" (逃れ得ぬ運命, Nogareenu Unmei); 48. "In the Direction of Hope" (希望の先に, Kibō no Saki ni)

=== Twilight of the Golden Witch ===
No.	Original release date	Original ISBN	English release date	English ISBN
1 (19)	August 22, 2012	978-4-7575-3703-3	April 30, 2019	978-0-316-44705-8
1. "To Rokkenjima" (六軒島へ, Rokkenjima e); 2. "Six-Year-Old Ange" (6歳の縁寿, Rokusai no Enje); 3. "The Gold Is Returned" (黄金の返還, Ōgon no Henkan); 4. "A Reason to Live" (生きる目的, Ikiru Mokuteki); 5. "Ceremonial Return" (返還式, Henkan-shiki)
2 (19)	December 22, 2012	978-4-7575-3830-6	April 30, 2019	978-0-316-44705-8
6. "The Halloween Party 1" (ハロウィンパーティー（1）, Harowin Pātī Ichi); 7. "The Halloween Party 2" (ハロウィンパーティー（2）, Harowin Pātī Ni); 8. "The Halloween Party 3" (ハロウィンパーティー（3）, Harowin Pātī San); 9. "The Party of Human and Witches 1" (人間と魔女の宴, Ningen to Majo no Utage); 10. "The Party of Human and Witches 2" (人間と魔女の宴（2）, Ningen to Majo no Utage Ni)
3 (19)	August 22, 2013	978-4-7575-4045-3	April 30, 2019	978-0-316-44705-8
11. "Bern's Question" (ベルンの出題, Berun no Shutsudai); 12. "Bern's Challenge" (ベルンの挑戦, Berun no Chōsen); 13. "A Late Visitor 1" (遅れてきた来訪者, Okurete Kita Raihōsha); 14. "A Late Visitor 2" (遅れてきた来訪者（2）, Okurete Kita Raihōsha Ni); 15. "A Late Visitor 3" (遅れてきた来訪者（3）, Okurete Kita Raihōsha San)
4 (20)	December 21, 2013	978-4-7575-4176-4	August 6, 2019	978-0-316-44716-4
16. "Black Cat's Claw Marks 1" (黒猫の爪痕, Kuroneko no Tsumeato); 17. "Black Cat's Claw Marks 2" (黒猫の爪痕（2）, Kuroneko no Tsumeato Ni); 18. "Black Cat's Claw Marks 3" (黒猫の爪痕（3）, Kuroneko no Tsumeato San); 19. "Black Cat's Claw Marks 4" (黒猫の爪痕（4）, Kuroneko no Tsumeato Yon); 20. "Battle in the Chapel 1" (礼拝堂の攻防, Reihaidō no Kōbō); 21. "Battle in the Chapel 2" (礼拝堂の攻防（2）, Reihaidō no Kōbō Ni)
5 (20)	August 22, 2014	978-4-7575-4389-8	August 6, 2019	978-0-316-44716-4
22. "City of Books" (図書の都, Tosho no Miyako); 23. "In the Golden Land" (黄金郷にて, Ōgonkyō nite); 24. "The Book of the One Truth" (一なる真実の書, Ichi Naru Shinjitsu no Sho); 25. "Interlude: Ikuko Hachijou" (interlude —八城幾子—, interlude Hachijō Ikuko)
6 (20)	December 22, 2014	978-4-7575-4497-0	August 6, 2019	978-0-316-44716-4
26. "Confession of the Golden Witch 1"; 27. "Confession of the Golden Witch 2"; 28. "Confession of the Golden Witch 3"; 29. "Cage of Constraints" (しがらみの檻, Shigarami no Ori)
7 (21)	April 22, 2015	978-4-7575-4609-7	June 23, 2020	978-0-316-44717-1
30. "Final Notice" (最後通牒, Saigo Tsūchō); 31. "Detective" (探偵, Tantei); 32. "Opening Hostilities" (開戦, Kaisen); 33. "Love-Hate Relationship" (愛憎遊戯, Aizō Yūgi); 34. "Violation" (蹂躙, Jūrin)
8 (21)	August 22, 2015	978-4-7575-4718-6	June 23, 2020	978-0-316-44717-1
35. "After the Battle" (激闘の果て, Gekitō no Hate); 36. "Death" (死, Shi); 37. "Resurrection" (反魂, Hangon); 38. "Ange's Choice" (縁寿の選択, Enje no Sentaku)
9 (21)	August 22, 2015	978-4-7575-4719-3	June 23, 2020	978-0-316-44717-1
39. "Beyond the Door ― Sleight of Hand, and Then..." (扉の先に～手品～、そして。, Tobira no Saki ni Tejina, Soshite); 40. "Beyond the Door ― Magic" (扉の先に～魔法～, Tobira no Saki ni Mahō); 41. "When the Seagulls Cry" (うみねこのなく頃に, Umineko no Naku Koro ni); 42. "The Golden Land" (黄金郷, Ōgonkyō)

=== Umineko: When They Cry Tsubasa ===
No.	Release date	ISBN
1	April 21, 2012	978-4-7575-3558-9
1. "The Witches' Tanabata Isn't Sweet" (魔女達の七夕は甘くない, Majotachi no Tanabata wa Amakunai); 2. "Game Master Battler!" (ゲームマスター戦人!, Gēmu Masutā Batora!); 3. "Labor Thanksgiving Day Gifts" (勤労感謝の日の贈り物, Kinrōkansha no Hi no Okurimono); 4. "Notes from a Certain Chef" (ある料理人の雑記, Aru Ryōrinin no Zakki); 5. "To Mount Purgatory, Sakutaro" (さくたろう、煉獄山へ, Sakutarō, Rengoku-san e)
2	August 22, 2012	978-4-7575-3714-9
6. "The Seven Sisters' Valentine" (七姉妹のバレンタイン, Nana Shimai no Barentain); 7. "Beatrice's White Day" (ベアトリーチェのホワイトデー, Beatorīche no Howaito Dē); 8. "Jessica's Mother's Day Present" (朱志香の母の日プレゼント, Jeshika no Haha no Hi Purezento); 9. "Whose Tea Party?" (だれのおちゃかい?, Dare no Ochakai?)
3	August 22, 2013	978-4-7575-4046-0
10. "Cornelia the New Priest" (新人司祭コーネリア, Shinjin Shisai Kōneria); 11. "Jessica and the Love Charm" (朱志香と恋のおまじない⌒☆, Jeshika to Koi no Omajinai); 12. "Arigato for 556"; 13. "Jessica and the Killer Electric Fan" (朱志香と殺人扇風機, Jeshika to Satsujin Senpūki)
