= Mashiro Ayano =

Japanese singer

- Born: 綾野ましろ; April 23
- Origin: Tōyako, Hokkaido, Japan
- Genre: J-pop
- Occupation: Singer
- Years active: 2014–present
- Labels: Ariola Japan (2014–2017); Sacra Music (2017–2021)
- Website: www.ayanomashiro.com

Mashiro Ayano (綾野 ましろ, Ayano Mashiro; born April 23 in Tōyako, Hokkaido) is a Japanese singer. She released her first single "ideal white" on October 22, 2014, which is used as the opening theme to the 2014 anime television series Fate/stay night: Unlimited Blade Works. Her second single "Vanilla Sky" released on April 29, 2015, which is used as the opening theme to the 2015 anime television series Gunslinger Stratos. "infinity beyond". Ayano's third single was released August 19, 2015, and was used as the theme song for the Gunslinger Stratos Reloaded PC game. Her fourth single, "Lotus Pain", was released on August 3, 2016, and is used as the ending theme for D.Gray-Man Hallow.

Her first album White Palace released on October 5, 2016. Ayano moved to the Sacra Music record label under Sony Music Entertainment Japan in April 2017. Her fifth single "Newlook" was released on May 17, 2017; the song is used as the ending theme of anime Re:Creators. Her sixth single "starry" was released on January 17, 2018; the song is used as the first opening theme of anime Record of Grancrest War. Her seventh single "Shōdō" (衝動, Impulse) was released digitally on May 12, 2018, and received physical release on May 16, 2018; the song is used as the second ending theme of anime Record of Grancrest War.

Her eighth single "Get Over/confession/ Glamorous Sky" was released on July 17, 2019. The song "Get Over" was released digitally on July 1, 2019, and it was used as the fourth ending song of anime Puzzle & Dragons Her second album Arch Angel was released on September 2, 2019 Her ninth single "Alive" was released on January 11, 2020, and received physical release on February 19, 2020; the song is used as the ending theme of anime Darwin's Game. On September 22, 2021, she released her first digital compilation album white chronicles.

On December 14, 2021, it was announced that she will leave her agency "Creative Office Cue" and label Sacra Music at the end of the year, after her contract expired.

On January 17, 2024, it was announced that she would resume large-scale activities after a hiatus since 2021. On the same day, a new official website and an official fan club "Neo-Mashirontier" were opened. Additionally, on February 3 she released the music video for her new song "FLAVOR. (GUM)" on her official YouTube channel. She released her first EP FLAVOR on March 1, 2024, with a digital version scheduled to be released on March 13, 2024.

== Discography ==
=== Studio albums ===
	Year	Albums	Peak Oricon albums chart position
1st	2016	White Place	27
2nd	2019	Arch Angel	38
3rd	2025	Songs of Animation	—

=== Compilation albums ===
	Year	Albums	Peak Oricon Albums chart position
1st digital	2021	white chronicles	49

=== Mini-albums ===
	Year	Albums	Peak Oricon Albums chart position
1st	2016	Early Days	43
2nd	2024	Flavor.	—

=== Singles ===
	Title	Year	Peak Oricon singles chart position	Album
1st	"ideal white"	2014	14	White Place
2nd	"Vanilla Sky"	2015	52	White Place
3rd	"infinity beyond"	2015	64	White Place
4th	"Lotus Pain"	2016	31	White Place
5th	"Newlook"	2017	26	Arch Angel
6th	"starry"	2018	29	Arch Angel
7th	"Shōdō"	2018	24	Arch Angel
8th	"Get Over / Confession / Glamorous Sky"	2019	49	Arch Angel
9th	"Alive"	2020	42	white chronicles

==== Digital singles ====
Year	Song	Album
2015	"Focus Light"	White Place
2016	"Believe"	Arch Angel
2018	"GLAMOROUS SKY"	white chronicles
2024	"The Everlasting Guilty Crown (Cover)"	Songs of Animation
