= Miki Satō (singer) =

Japanese musician from Hokkaido

Miki Satō 佐藤 ミキ
- Born: September 29, 1996 (age 30); Hokkaido, Japan
- Genre: Anison
- Occupation: Singer
- Years active: 2020–present
- Label: Sacra Music
- Website: www.satomiki-official.com

Miki Satō (佐藤 ミキ, Satō Miki; born September 29, 1996) is a Japanese musician from Hokkaido who is signed to Sacra Music. She began her activities in 2020 with the release of her first single "Namonai Hana", the title track of which was used as the ending theme to the second season of The Irregular at Magic High School.

== Biography ==
Satō spent part of her elementary years studying in Australia as part of an exchange program, and would return to the country for studies while in high school. She originally considered pursuing as a career as a pharmacist or civil servant upon the advice of her parents, but decided to pursue a music career upon reaching high school. During that time, she became a member of her school's light music club, becoming a vocalist and later bassist of a band. Her desire to become a musician was also inspired by her seeing how amateur bands were being discovered on Twitter. Her parents were initially disapproving of her plans as they thought it would affect her studies for university entrance exams, but became supportive after she passed and entered university. While in university, she participated in a program where students could visit a Chinese school and bring gifts. During her commutes between her home and school, she would look at the scenery while riding the train and write down lyrics.

Satō made her major debut under Sacra Music in 2020. Her song "Play the Real" was released on her YouTube channel in July 2020, followed by the limited-release song "A Ka Sa Ta Na" in August of the same year. Her first major single "Namonai Hana" (名もない花) was released on December 2, 2020; the title song is used as the ending theme to the second season of The Irregular at Magic High School. Her second single "You & Me" was released on March 10, 2021; the title song is used as the ending theme of the anime television series Otherside Picnic.

== Discography ==
=== Singles ===
| Title | Peak Oricon position |
|---|---|
| "Namonai Hana" (名もない花): Release date: December 2, 2020 | 35 |
| "You & Me": Release date: March 10, 2021 | |
