= John Burgmeier =

American voice actor (born 1974)

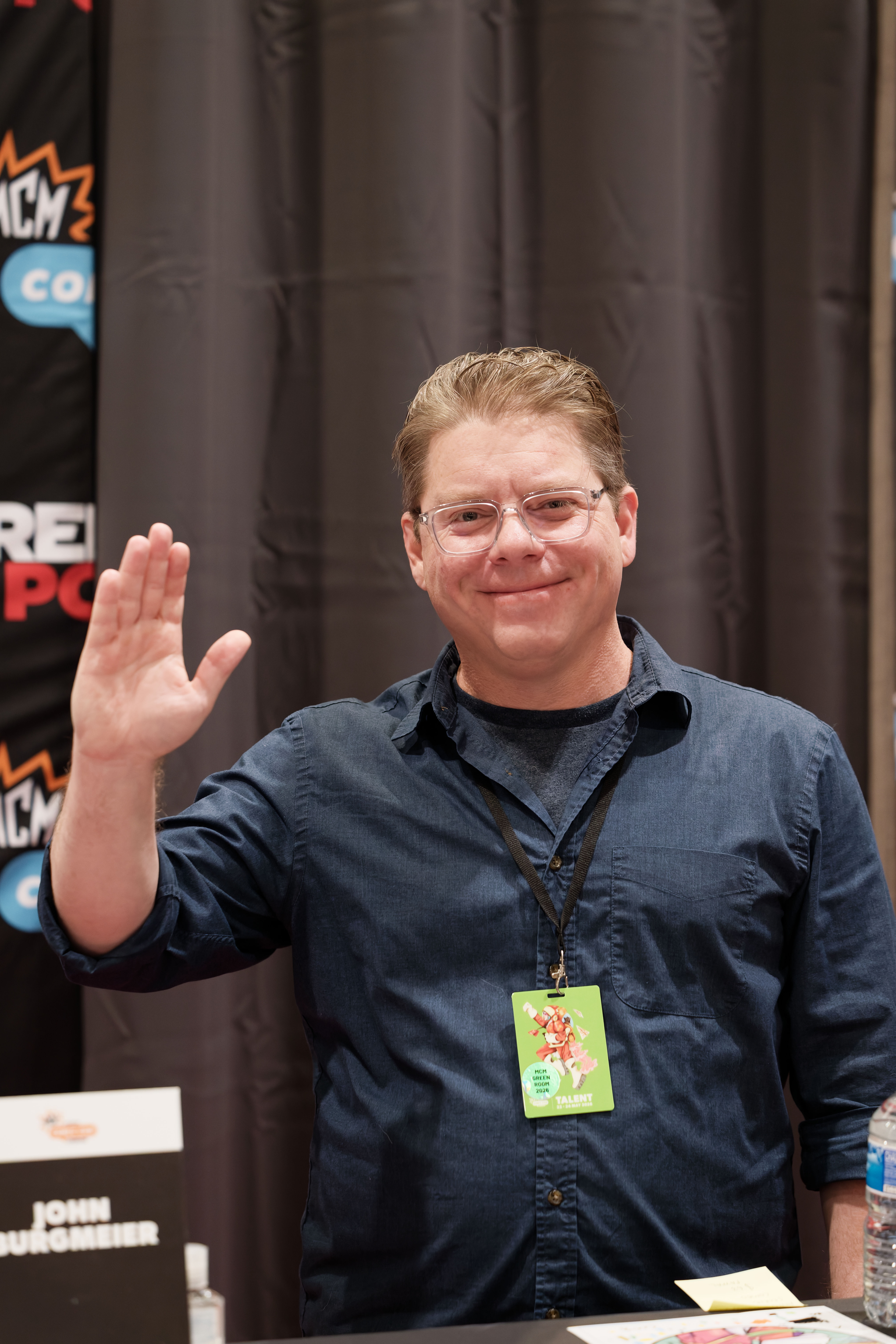
- Burgmeier at the 2026 MCM London Comic Con
- Born: October 24, 1974 (age 52); Chicago, Illinois, U.S.
- Occupations: Voice actor; ADR script writer; musician
- Mother: Linda Young

John Burgmeier (born October 24, 1974) is an American voice actor and ADR script writer who provides voices for English versions of Japanese anime series and video games. As a voice actor, he is best known as the voice of Kurama from YuYu Hakusho, Tien from the Dragon Ball series, Shigure Sohma from Fruits Basket, Eyes Rutherford from Spiral, and Switzerland from Hetalia: Axis Powers. Burgmeier is also the son of voice actress Linda Young. Burgmeier was the head writer at Funimation for several years before retiring from the role in 2018. During his tenure, he worked as head writer for the English dub version of One Piece and voiced several minor characters.

== Discography ==
Burgmeier is also a musician and member of the rock band El Gato. He plays guitar, keyboard, and other instruments across the band's two albums and EP. While the members of El Gato are not currently active, they will still occasionally play a show.

=== EP ===
- Everybody's a Pinata (1997)

=== Albums ===
- We're Birds (2002)
- Surrender! (2008)

== Dubbing roles ==
=== Anime ===
List of dubbing performances and production work in anime
Year	Series	Role	Crew role, Notes	Source
	Aesthetica of a Rogue Hero		Head Writer	
	All Out!!	Kenya Horikawa		
	B Gata H Kei		Head Writer	
	Beck: Mongolian Chop Squad	Eiji		
	Blood-C		Head Writer	
	Case Closed: The Time Bombed Skyscraper	Taguchi		
	Daimidaler: Prince vs Penguin Empire		Head Writer	
	Deadman Wonderland		Head Writer	
	Eden of the East	Haruo Kasuga	Head Writer	
	Fafner: Dead Aggressor: Heaven and Earth		Script writer	
	Future Diary		Head Writer	
	Garo: The Animation	Book	Ep. 18	
	Good Luck Girl!		Head Writer	
	Haganai		Head Writer	
	Hell Girl	Hajime Shibata		
	Hero Tales	Ryuko Mouten		
	Hetalia: Axis Powers series	Switzerland		
	High School DxD		Head Writer	
	High School DxD BorN	Loki		
	Initial D	Takeshi Nakazato	Head Writer, Funimation Dub, Takeshi for Third Stage only	
	Kamisama Kiss		Head Writer	
	King of Thorn		Head Writer	
	Last Exile: Fam, the Silver Wing	Sorush	Head Writer	
	Maken-ki!		Head Writer	
	Black Cat		River Zastory	
	Dragon Age: Dawn of the Seeker	Anthony Pentaghast		
	Panty & Stocking with Garterbelt		Head Writer	
1999-	One Piece series	Lucky Roux, Ironfist Fullbody, Kouzuki Sukiyaki, Monda	Head Writer	
2000	Dragon Ball series	Tien Shinhan, Saibamen, Yamu, Gregory, Caroni, Nuova Shenron, Dium, Shusugoro, Angila	Funimation dub	
2001	Blue Gender	Joey Heald		
2002	Fruits Basket	Shigure Sohma	English Script Adaptation	
2002	YuYu Hakusho	Kurama		
2003	Fullmetal Alchemist series	Dolchetto		
2004	Spiral	Eyes Rutherford		
2005	Gunslinger Girl series	Jose		
2005	Kodocha	Rei Sagami		
2009-14	Rebuild of Evangelion series		Funimation dub, Head Writer, Script (1.0 and 2.0)	
2010	Soul Eater	Rachel's Father	Head Writer	
2010	Summer Wars	Tasuke Jinnouchi	Head Writer	
2012	Sekirei: Pure Engagement	Takehito Asama		
2012-13	Shakugan no Shana	Johann	Head Writer, Season 2, Movie, and S OVAs	
2012	Shiki	Seishin Muroi		
2012	Steins;Gate		Head Writer	
2012-2019	Fairy Tail	Freed Justine	Script Adapter, Head Writer (season 2)	
2012	Mass Effect: Paragon Lost		ADR Lead Adapter	
2013	Tenchi Muyo! War on Geminar		Head Writer	
2014	Attack on Titan	Dieter, Tom Ksaver	Head Writer	
2014-16	Psycho-Pass	Amane Shibazaki	2 episodes, Head Writer	
2015-16	Noragami	Ebisu		
2015	Yona of the Dawn	Keishuk		
2016	Chaos Dragon		Head Writer	
2016	Izetta: The Last Witch	Arnold Berkmann		
2017	Black Clover	Seihi	Ep. 8	
2017	Blood Blockade Battlefront & Beyond	Philip Lenore	Ep. 5	
2017	Garo: Crimson Moon	Toru	Ep. 15, Head Writer	
2017	Garo: Vanishing Line	Pawn	Ep. 7	
2017	Gosick	Alan	Eps. 6-7	
2017	Kado: The Right Answer	Adam Ward		
2017	Regalia: The Three Sacred Stars		Head Writer	
2017	Samurai Warriors	Ii Naomasa	Head Writer	
2017	Space Patrol Luluco		Head Writer	
2017	The Ancient Magus' Bride	Matthew	Eps. 4-5	
2018	Full Metal Panic!	Michel Lemon		
2018	Junji Ito Collection	Yukihiko Kitawaki	ep 4	
2018	That Time I Got Reincarnated as a Slime	Clayman		
2018	Overlord	Piki	Episode: "The Dawn of Despair"	
2019	Fairy Gone	Damian Carme		
2019-21	Fruits Basket (2019)	Shigure Sohma		
2021	The Case Study of Vanitas	The Teacher		
2022	I'm the Villainess, So I'm Taming the Final Boss	Claude		
2022	One Piece Film: Red	Lucky Roux		
2022-23	Spy × Family	Donovan Desmond		
2023	Reign of the Seven Spellblades	Garland		
2024	Fairy Tail: 100 Years Quest	Freed Justine		
2024	Delico's Nursery	Dino Classico		
2025	Dr. Stone: Science Future	Dr. Xeno		
2025	Zenshu	Vendor		
2025	To Be Hero X	Shand		
2025	Gachiakuta	Regto		
2025	Let's Play	Samuel		
2026	As a Reincarnated Aristocrat, I'll Use My Appraisal Skill to Rise in the World	Raven Louvent		

=== Video games ===
List of dubbing performances in video games
Year	Series	Role	Notes	Source
2002-present	Dragon Ball series	Tien Shinhan, Tiencha, Nuova Shenron, Yamu, Saibamen		

=== Live action dubbing ===
List of dubbing performances in live action films
Year	Title	Role	Source
2016	Shin Godzilla	Gorō Sekiguchi	
2022	Shin Ultraman	Kimio Tamura	
