= Otherside Picnic =

Japanese novel series

- First novel volume cover, featuring Toriko Nishina (left) and Sorawo Kamikoshi (right)

裏世界ピクニック (Ura Sekai Pikunikku)
- Genre: Adventure, science fiction, yuri
- Novel series
- Written by: Iori Miyazawa
- Illustrated by: shirakaba
- Published by: Hayakawa Publishing
- English publisher: NA: J-Novel Club
- Imprint: Hayakawa Bunko JA
- Original run: February 23, 2017 – present
- Volumes: 11
- Manga
- Written by: Iori Miyazawa
- Illustrated by: Eita Mizuno
- Published by: Square Enix
- English publisher: NA: Square Enix
- Imprint: Gangan Comics
- Magazine: Monthly Shōnen Gangan
- Original run: February 10, 2018 – present
- Volumes: 17
- Anime television series
- Directed by: Takuya Satō
- Produced by: Shouta Watase; Yasutaka Kimura; Mitsutoshi Ogura; Rikimaru Mizoguchi; Ryuuji Abe; Tomoyuki Oowada; Tsuyoshi Aida; Nobuhito Hayashi; Youhei Kikuchi; Yoshihiro Ishikawa
- Written by: Takuya Satō
- Music by: Takeshi Watanabe
- Studio: Liden Films; Felix Film
- Licensed by: Crunchyroll (Note: In North America through Crunchyroll, LLC (formerly known as Funimation).); SA/SEA: Medialink
- Original network: AT-X, JAITS (Tokyo MX, SUN), BS11
- Original run: January 4, 2021 – March 22, 2021
- Episodes: 12
- icon

Otherside Picnic (Japanese: 裏世界ピクニック, Hepburn: Ura Sekai Pikunikku) is a Japanese yuri science fiction novel series written by Iori Miyazawa and illustrated by shirakaba, inspired by the novel Roadside Picnic by Arkady and Boris Strugatsky. Hayakawa Publishing have released ten volumes of the series since February 2017. A manga adaptation with art by Eita Mizuno has been serialized since February 2018 via Square Enix's shōnen manga magazine Monthly Shōnen Gangan, and has been collected in seventeen tankōbon volumes. The novels are licensed in North America by J-Novel Club, while the manga is licensed by Square Enix. An anime television series adaptation by Liden Films and Felix Film aired from January to March 2021.

== Synopsis ==
College student Sorawo Kamikoshi, in the midst of engaging in her hobby of urban exploration, stumbles upon a strange door in an abandoned building which leads into the Otherside—a mysterious and terrifying world seemingly populated by locations and monsters from internet creepypasta and urban legends. Sorawo nearly dies in her attempt to explore it, but is rescued by Toriko Nishina, a young woman who is skilled with guns, more experienced in regards to the Otherside, and is looking for a lost friend. Sorawo and Toriko, spurred by the payments delivered by a researcher named Kozakura, return to the Otherside to bring back artifacts and deal with the monsters best that they can. As time goes on, the two are increasingly affected by the byproducts of being involved with the Otherside, meet some humans who are trapped within it, and find themselves increasingly affected by each other.

== Characters ==
Sorawo Kamikoshi (紙越 空魚, Kamikoshi Sorao)
Voiced by: Yumiri Hanamori (Japanese); Madeleine Morris (English)
A sophomore at a university in Saitama Prefecture. She loves and has a wealth of knowledge about urban legends and real-life ghost stories. She enjoys exploring abandoned buildings, and discovered the existence of the Otherside through a door she found while doing so. She does not have many friends, but Toriko, who she met in the Otherside, invites her to go there to explore, research, and earn money. Her mother instantly died in an accident, and her grandmother and father became devoted to a cult afterwards, causing her to repeatedly run away from home and explore abandoned houses to escape her disintegrating family, which was persuading her to join the cult, but after her grandmother and father died, she is now attending college on a scholarship.
Toriko Nishina (仁科 鳥子, Nishina Toriko)
Voiced by: Ai Kayano (Japanese); Emily Neves (English)
A woman who searches the Otherside for her missing friend Satsuki. She appears to be a college student. Both of her mothers have died; one was a soldier in Joint Task Force 2, a special operations force of the Canadian army, so Toriko is familiar with firearms. She has long blond hair and is, in the opinion of Sorawo, "extremely beautiful". Her character in the story is very positive, but she has a tendency to isolate herself from others, and has no friends other than Sorawo and Satsuki, who was Toriko's tutor.
Kozakura (小桜)
Voiced by: Rina Hidaka (Japanese); Sarah Wiedenheft (English)
A researcher of the Otherside who has a residence near Shakujii Park. A friend of Satsuki's from her college days, she was concerned about Satsuki's investigation of the Otherside because it was dangerous and had warned her many times. When Satsuki ignores her warnings and continues with her research, she goes missing, which makes her angry and frustrated with Satsuki. When Sorawo first meets Kozakura, she looks so young that she gives off the impression of being in grade school, but she appears to be older than Sorawo and Toriko, and is shown drinking and driving a car. As a hobby, she has created an avatar named "Yozakura" (夜桜) on the Internet and has been streaming videos. The image of Yozakura is based on that of her friend Satsuki. In the past, she created another avatar based on her own image, but destroyed it due to the increase in the number of fans who disagreed with her intentions. For Sorawo and Toriko, she is a client of the goods they obtained during their exploration of the Otherside, and is in the position of a consultant. The artifacts that Sorawo and Toriko have acquired in the Otherside are purchased by Kozakura, while the funds to purchase them are provided by the DS Research Encouragement Association, a research organization that Satsuki and Kozakura joined to conduct research on the Otherside.
Satsuki Uruma (閏間 冴月, Uruma Satsuki)
Kozakura's peer who was exploring the Otherside. She disappears three months before the start of the story. She is a tall woman with long black hair and thick-rimmed glasses. She invited her friend Kozakura to be her partner in order to expand her investigation of the Otherside, but Kozakura was afraid of the Otherside and refused, so she went to search for a promising replacement partner. Toriko Nishina was one of them.
Akari Seto (瀬戸 茜理, Seto Akari)
Voiced by: Miyu Tomita (Japanese); AmaLee (English)
A freshman student studying at the same university as Sorawo. She is a karate practitioner and won the prefectural tournament in high school. She is from Saitama, but lives alone in an apartment because her parents moved away for work reasons. Her personality is bright and curious.
Yōichirō Migiwa (汀 曜一郎, Migiwa Yōichirō)
A man who serves as the Director General of DS. Although he is not a researcher himself, he once went to Central America during his adolescence because of his devotion to Carlos Castaneda, and he has a tattoo of Maya scripts on his arm. He is skilled in the use of firearms, traps, and torture, and has a personal connection to a private military company, making him a man of many mysteries.
Natsumi Ichikawa (市川 夏妃, Ichikawa Natsumi)
Voiced by: Miyuri Shimabukuro (Japanese); Michelle Rojas (English)
Akari's childhood friend and confidant. After graduating from high school, she did not go on to higher education, but instead works at her family's garage.

== Media ==
=== Novels ===
Otherside Picnic is written by Iori Miyazawa and illustrated by shirakaba. Hayakawa Publishing have published ten volumes since February 2017, while J-Novel Club have released nine volumes in North America.

==== Volumes ====
No.	Title	Original release date	English release date
1	Their Strange Exploration Files; Futari no Kaii Tanken Fairu (ふたりの怪異探検ファイル)	February 23, 2017; 978-4-15-031264-0	September 23, 2019; 978-1-7183-5998-7
File 1: "Kunekune Hunting" (くねくねハンティング, Kunekune Hantingu); File 2: "Hasshaku-sama Survival" (八尺様サバイバル, Hasshaku-sama Sabaibaru); File 3: "Station February" (ステーション・フェブラリー, Sutēshon Feburarī); File 4: "Time, Space, and a Middle-aged Man" (時間、空間、おっさん, Jikan, Kūkan, Ossan)
2	Resort Night at the Beach of the End; Hate no Hamabe no Rizōto Naito (果ての浜辺のリゾートナイト)	October 19, 2017; 978-4-15-031264-0	January 11, 2020; 978-1-7183-6000-6
File 5: "The Operation to Rescue the U.S. Forces at Kisaragi Station" (きさらぎ駅米軍救出作戦, Kisaragi Eki Beigun Kyūshutsu Sakusen); File 6: "Resort Night at the Beach of the End" (果ての浜辺のリゾートナイト, Hate no Hamabe no Rizōto Naito); File 7: "Attack of the Ninja Cats" (猫の忍者に襲われる, Neko no Ninja ni Osowareru); File 8: "Little Bird in a Box" (箱の中の小鳥, Hako no Naka no Kotori)
3	Yamanoke Presence; Yamanokehai (ヤマノケハイ)	November 20, 2018; 978-4-15-031351-7	April 12, 2020; 978-1-7183-6002-0
File 9: "Yamanoke Presence" (ヤマノケハイ, Yamanokehai); File 10: "Sannuki-san and Karateka-san" (サンヌキさんとカラテカさん, Sannuki-san to Karateka-san); File 11: "The Whispered Voice Requires Self-Responsibility" (ささやきボイスは自己責任, Sasayaki Boisu wa Jiko Sekinin)
4	Overnight on the Otherside; Urasekai Yakō (裏世界夜行)	December 19, 2019; 978-4-15-031408-8	December 27, 2020; 978-1-7183-6004-4
File 12: "The Matter of That Farm" (あの牧場の件, Ano Bokujō no Kudan); File 13: "Pandora in the Next Room" (隣の部屋のバンドラ, Tonari no Heya no Pandora); File 14: "The Inviting Hot Springs" (招きの湯, Maneki no Yu); File 15: "Overnight on the Otherside" (裏世界夜行, Urasekai Yakō)
5	Hasshaku-sama Revival; Hasshaku-sama Ribaibaru (八尺様リバイバル)	December 17, 2020; 978-4-15-031448-4	August 18, 2021; 978-1-7183-6006-8
File 16: "Pontianak Hotel" (ボンティアナック・ホテル, Pontianakku Hoteru); File 17: "Looking at the Past in the Diagonal Mirror" (斜め鏡に過去を視る, Naname Kagami ni Kako o Miru); File 18: "Alone Together in a Mayoiga" (マヨイガにふたりきり, Mayoiga ni Futari Kiri); File 19: "Hasshaku-sama Revival" (八尺様リバイバル, Hasshaku-sama Ribaibaru)
6	T is for Templeborn; T wa Tera Umare no T (Tは寺生まれのT)	March 17, 2021; 978-4-15-031476-7	November 15, 2021; 978-1-7183-6008-2
File 20: "T is for Templeborn" (Tは寺生まれのT, T wa Tera Umare no T)
7	Funeral of the Moon; Tsuki no Sōsō (月の葬送)	December 16, 2021; 978-4-15-031509-2	June 7, 2022; 978-1-7183-6010-5
File 21: "A Midterm Report on the Mysterious" (怪異に関する中間発表, Kaii ni Kansuru Chūkan Happyō); File 22: "Toilet Paper Moon" (トイレット・ペーパームーン, Toiretto Pēpāmūn); File 23: "Funeral of the Moon" (月の葬送, Tsuki no Sōsō)
8	Accomplices No More; Kyōhansha no Owari (共犯者の終り)	January 24, 2023; 978-4-15-031542-9	August 22, 2023; 978-1-7183-6012-9
File 24: "Mujina Attacks" (ムジナ・アタックス, Mujina Atakkusu); File 25: "Learn Your Lesson" (オモイシレ, Omoishire); File 26: "Accomplices No More" (共犯者の終り, Kyōhansha no Owari)
9	The Fourth Kinds' Summer Holiday; Daiyonshu-tachi no Natsuyasumi (第四種たちの夏休み)	May 22, 2024; 978-4-15-031573-3	March 24, 2025; 978-1-7183-6014-3
File 27: "The Lion's Divination" (獅子の卦, Shishi no Ke); File 28: "Kaidancraft" (カイダンクラフト, Kaidan Kurafuto); File 29: "The Fourth Kinds' Summer Holiday" (第四種たちの夏休み, Daiyonshu-tachi no Natsuyasumi)
10	All Possible Ghost Stories; Ariuru Subete no Kaidan (あり得るすべての怪談)	March 19, 2025; 978-4-15-031590-0	July 13, 2026; 978-1-7183-6016-7
File 30: "Have You Heard of a Reverse Lap Pillow?" (裏膝枕って知ってる？, Ura Hizamakura tte Shitteru?); File 31: "All Possible Ghost Stories" (あり得るすべての怪談, Ariuru Subete no Kaidan); File 32: "Underground People" (アンダーグラウンド・ピープル, Andāguraundo Pīpuru)

=== Manga ===
A manga adaptation by Eita Mizuno was announced in November 2017. The manga began serialization in February 2018 via Square Enix's shōnen manga magazine Monthly Shōnen Gangan, and has been collected in seventeen tankōbon volumes. In July 2020, Square Enix announced that they would publish the manga in North America.

==== Volumes ====
No.	Original release date	Original ISBN	English release date	English ISBN
1	August 22, 2018	978-4-7575-5805-2	August 31, 2021	978-1-64609-106-5
1. "Wriggler Hunting I" (くねくね ハンティング I, Kunekune Hantingu I); 2. "Wriggler Hunting II" (くねくね ハンティング II, Kunekune Hantingu II); 3. "Surviving the Eight-Foot-Tall Lady I" (八尺様 サバイバル I, Hasshaku-sama Sabaibaru I); 4. "Surviving the Eight-Foot-Tall Lady II" (八尺様 サバイバル II, Hasshaku-sama Sabaibaru II); 5. "Surviving the Eight-Foot-Tall Lady III" (八尺様 サバイバル III, Hasshaku-sama Sabaibaru III); Special Story: "Ms. Yozakura's Late-Night Livestream" (夜桜おねえさんの深夜配信, Yozakura Onee-san no Shinya Haishin)
2	January 9, 2019	978-4-7575-5973-8	August 23, 2022	978-1-64609-107-2
6. "Surviving the Eight-Foot-Tall Lady IV" (八尺様 サバイバル IV, Hasshaku-sama Sabaibaru IV); 7. "Station February I" (ステーション・フェブラリー I, Sutēshon Feburarī I); 8. Station February II (ステーション・フェブラリー II, Sutēshon Feburarī II); 9. "Station February III" (ステーション・フェブラリー III, Sutēshon Feburarī III); 10. "Station February IV" (ステーション・フェブラリー IV, Sutēshon Feburarī IV); Special Chapter: "Late-Night Chicken and a Gorilla" (真夜中のチキンとゴリラ, Mayonaka no Chikin to Gorira)
3	August 9, 2019	978-4-7575-6235-6	December 27, 2022	978-1-64609-108-9
11. "Station February V" (ステーション・フェブラリー V, Sutēshon Feburarī V); 12. "Station February VI" (ステーション・フェブラリー VI, Sutēshon Feburarī VI); 13. "Station February VII" (ステーション・フェブラリー VII, Sutēshon Feburarī VII); 14. "Time, Space, Man I" (時間、空間、おっさん I, Jikan, Kūkan, Ossan I); 15. "Time, Space, Man II" (時間、空間、おっさん I, Jikan, Kūkan, Ossan II); 16. "Time, Space, Man III" (時間、空間、おっさん I, Jikan, Kūkan, Ossan III); 17. "Time, Space, Man IV" (時間、空間、おっさん IV, Jikan, Kūkan, Ossan IV); Special Chapter: "Night of the Cornered Bird's Visit" (窮鳥来たる夜, Kyūchō Kitaru Yoru)
4	March 12, 2020	978-4-7575-7000-9	April 25, 2023	978-1-64609-109-6
18. "Time, Space, Man V" (時間、空間、おっさん V, Jikan, Kūkan, Ossan V); 19. "Time, Space, Man VI" (時間、空間、おっさん VI, Jikan, Kūkan, Ossan VI); 20. "Time, Space, Man VII" (時間、空間、おっさん VII, Jikan, Kūkan, Ossan VII); 21. "Time, Space, Man VIII" (時間、空間、おっさん V, Jikan, Kūkan, Ossan VIII); 22. "Time, Space, Man IX" (時間、空間、おっさん IX, Jikan, Kūkan, Ossan IX); 23. "Time, Space, Man X" (時間、空間、おっさん X, Jikan, Kūkan, Ossan X); 24. "The Kisaragi Station Marines Rescue Operation I" (きさらぎ駅米軍救出作戦 I, Kisaragi Eki Beigun Kyūshutsu Sakusen I); Special Chapter: "Before Night Falls" (夜が降りて来る前に, Yoru ga Orite Kuru Mae ni)
5	December 11, 2020	978-4-7575-6548-7	June 27, 2023	978-1-64609-130-0
25. "The Kisaragi Station Marines Rescue Operation II" (きさらぎ駅米軍救出作戦 II, Kisaragi Eki Beigun Kyūshutsu Sakusen II); 26. "The Kisaragi Station Marines Rescue Operation III" (きさらぎ駅米軍救出作戦 III, Kisaragi Eki Beigun Kyūshutsu Sakusen III); 27. "The Kisaragi Station Marines Rescue Operation IV" (きさらぎ駅米軍救出作戦 IV, Kisaragi Eki Beigun Kyūshutsu Sakusen IV); 28. "The Kisaragi Station Marines Rescue Operation V" (きさらぎ駅米軍救出作戦 V, Kisaragi Eki Beigun Kyūshutsu Sakusen V); 29. "The Kisaragi Station Marines Rescue Operation VI" (きさらぎ駅米軍救出作戦 VI, Kisaragi Eki Beigun Kyūshutsu Sakusen VI); 30. "The Kisaragi Station Marines Rescue Operation VII" (きさらぎ駅米軍救出作戦 VII, Kisaragi Eki Beigun Kyūshutsu Sakusen VII); Special Chapter: "And Then Night Falls" (やがて夜になる, Yagate Yoru ni Naru)
6	March 12, 2021	978-4-7575-7150-1	August 22, 2023	978-1-64609-149-2
31. "The Kisaragi Station Marines Rescue Operation VIII" (きさらぎ駅米軍救出作戦 VIII, Kisaragi Eki Beigun Kyūshutsu Sakusen VIII); 32. "Resort Night at the Beach of the End I" (果ての浜辺のリゾートナイト I, Hate no Hamabe no Rizōto Naito I); 33. "Resort Night at the Beach of the End II" (果ての浜辺のリゾートナイト II, Hate no Hamabe no Rizōto Naito II); 34. "Resort Night at the Beach of the End III" (果ての浜辺のリゾートナイト III, Hate no Hamabe no Rizōto Naito III); 35. "Resort Night at the Beach of the End IV" (果ての浜辺のリゾートナイト IV, Hate no Hamabe no Rizōto Naito IV); Special Chapter: "Ms. Yozakura's Food Spam Livestream" (夜桜お姉さんの飯テロ配信, Yozakura Onee-san no Meshi Tero Haishin)
7	October 12, 2021	978-4-7575-7525-7	October 24, 2023	978-1-64609-168-3
36. "Resort Night at the Beach of the End V" (果ての浜辺のリゾートナイト V, Hate no Hamabe no Rizōto Naito V); 37. "The Attack of the Ninja Cats I" (猫の忍者に襲われる I, Neko no Ninja ni Osowareru I); 38. "The Attack of the Ninja Cats II" (猫の忍者に襲われる II, Neko no Ninja ni Osowareru II); 39. "The Attack of the Ninja Cats III" (猫の忍者に襲われる III, Neko no Ninja ni Osowareru III); 40. "The Attack of the Ninja Cats IV" (猫の忍者に襲われる IV, Neko no Ninja ni Osowareru IV); 41. "The Attack of the Ninja Cats V" (猫の忍者に襲われる V, Neko no Ninja ni Osowareru V); Special Chapter: "The Tanuki Guards the Night" (狸は夜の番人, Tanuki wa Yoru no Bannin)
8	March 11, 2022	978-4-7575-7807-4	December 19, 2023	978-1-64609-197-3
42. "The Little Bird in a Box I" (箱の中の小鳥 I, Hako no Naka no Kotori I); 43. "The Little Bird in a Box II" (箱の中の小鳥 II, Hako no Naka no Kotori II); 44. "The Little Bird in a Box III" (箱の中の小鳥 III, Hako no Naka no Kotori III); 45. "The Little Bird in a Box IV" (箱の中の小鳥 IV, Hako no Naka no Kotori IV); 46. "The Little Bird in a Box V" (箱の中の小鳥 V, Hako no Naka no Kotori V); Special Chapter: "A Friend Who Works Nights" (夜仕事の友人, Yoru Shigoto no Yūjin)
9	September 12, 2022	978-4-7575-8133-3	April 23, 2024	978-1-64609-229-1
47. "The Little Bird in a Box VI" (箱の中の小鳥 VI, Hako no Naka no Kotori VI); 48. "Yamanoke Presence I" (ヤマノケハイ I, Yamanokehai I); 49. "Yamanoke Presence II" (ヤマノケハイ II, Yamanokehai II); 50. "Yamanoke Presence III" (ヤマノケハイ III, Yamanokehai III); 51. "Sannuki and the Karate Kid I" (サンヌキさんとカラテカさん I, Sannuki-san to Karateka-san I); Special Chapter: "A Daytime Guest" (白昼の客, Hakuchū no Kyaku)
10	March 10, 2023	978-4-7575-8465-5	July 9, 2024	978-1-64609-261-1
52. "Sannuki and the Karate Kid II" (サンヌキさんとカラテカさん II, Sannuki-san to Karateka-san II); 53. "Sannuki and the Karate Kid III" (サンヌキさんとカラテカさん III, Sannuki-san to Karateka-san III); 54. "The Whisper Is At-Your-Own-Risk I" (ささやきボイスは自己責任 I, Sasayaki Boisu wa Jiko Sekinin I); 55. "The Whisper Is At-Your-Own-Risk II" (ささやきボイスは自己責任 II, Sasayaki Boisu wa Jiko Sekinin II); 56. "The Whisper Is At-Your-Own-Risk III" (ささやきボイスは自己責任 III, Sasayaki Boisu wa Jiko Sekinin III); Special Chapter: "Getting Lost in Self-Loathing" (自己嫌悪で暮れてゆく, Jiko Ken'o de Kurete Yuku)
11	September 12, 2023	978-4-7575-8785-4	November 5, 2024	978-1-64609-304-5
57. "The Whisper Is At-Your-Own-Risk IV" (ささやきボイスは自己責任 IV, Sasayaki Boisu wa Jiko Sekinin IV); 58. "The Whisper Is At-Your-Own-Risk V" (ささやきボイスは自己責任 V, Sasayaki Boisu wa Jiko Sekinin V); 59. "The Whisper Is At-Your-Own-Risk VI" (ささやきボイスは自己責任 VI, Sasayaki Boisu wa Jiko Sekinin VI); 60. "The Whisper Is At-Your-Own-Risk VII" (ささやきボイスは自己責任 VII, Sasayaki Boisu wa Jiko Sekinin VII); 61. "The Whisper Is At-Your-Own-Risk VIII" (ささやきボイスは自己責任 VIII, Sasayaki Boisu wa Jiko Sekinin VIII); Special Chapter: "A Whisper in the Dead of Night" (夜半の髪さ, Yahan no Kami sa)
12	March 12, 2024	978-4-7575-9095-3	April 1, 2025	978-1-64609-368-7
62. "The Whisper Is At-Your-Own-Risk IX" (ささやきボイスは自己責任 IX, Sasayaki Boisu wa Jiko Sekinin IX); 63. "The Whisper Is At-Your-Own-Risk X" (ささやきボイスは自己責任 X, Sasayaki Boisu wa Jiko Sekinin X); 64. "About That Ranch I" (あの牧場の作I, Ano Bokujō no Saku I); 65. "About That Ranch II" (あの牧場の作II, Ano Bokujō no Saku II); 66. "About That Ranch III" (あの牧場の作III, Ano Bokujō no Saku III); 67. "About That Ranch IV" (あの牧場の作IV, Ano Bokujō no Saku IV); Special Chapter: "Flashback to That Night" (あの夜のフラッシュバック, Ano Yoru no Furasshu Bakku)
13	October 10, 2024	978-4-7575-9467-8	November 18, 2025	978-1-64609-436-3
68. "Pandora in the Next Room I" (隣の部屋のパンドラ I, Tonari no Heya no Pandora I); 69. "Pandora in the Next Room II" (隣の部屋のパンドラ II, Tonari no Heya no Pandora II); 70. "Pandora in the Next Room III" (隣の部屋のパンドラ III, Tonari no Heya no Pandora III); 71. "Pandora in the Next Room IV" (隣の部屋のパンドラ IV, Tonari no Heya no Pandora IV); 72. "Hot Springs Invitation I" (招きの湯 I, Maneki no Yu I); Special Chapter: "Packing as the Night Deepens" (夜は荷造りで更けていく, Yoru wa Nidzukuri de Fukete Iku)
14	March 12, 2025	978-4-7575-9731-0	May 5, 2026	978-1-64609-465-3
73. "Hot Springs Invitation II" (招きの湯 II, Maneki no Yu II); 74. "Hot Springs Invitation III" (招きの湯 III, Maneki no Yu III); 75. "Overnight on the Otherside I" (裏世界夜行 I, Ura Sekai Yakō I); 76. "Overnight on the Otherside II" (裏世界夜行 II, Ura Sekai Yakō II); 77. "Overnight on the Otherside III" (裏世界夜行 III, Ura Sekai Yakō III); Special Chapter: "Ms. Yozakura's 'I Took a Trip to Chichibu' Livestream" (夜桜おねえさんの秩父旅行いってきたよ配信, Yozakura Onee-san no Chichibu Ryokō Itte Kita yo Haishin)
15	September 11, 2025	978-4-301-00052-5	October 20, 2026	979-8-89910-006-2
78. "Overnight on the Otherside IV" (裏世界夜行 IV, Ura Sekai Yakō IV); 79. "Pontianak Hotel I" (ポンティアナック・ホテル I, Pontianakku Hoteru I); 80. "Pontianak Hotel II" (ポンティアナック・ホテル II, Pontianakku Hoteru II); 81. "Looking at the Past in the Diagonal Mirror I" (斜め鏡に過去を視る I, Naname Kagami ni Kako o Miru I); 82. "Looking at the Past in the Diagonal Mirror II" (斜め鏡に過去を視る II, Naname Kagami ni Kako o Miru II); Special Chapter: "Early-Morning Aftermath" (早朝のアフターマス, Sōchō no Afutāmasu)
16	May 12, 2026	978-4-301-00515-5	—	—
83. Naname Kagami ni Kako o Miru III (斜め鏡に過去を視る III); 84. Mayoiga ni Futari Kiri I (マヨイガにふたりきり I); 85. Mayoiga ni Futari Kiri II (マヨイガにふたりきり II); 86. Hasshaku-sama Ribaibaru I (八尺様リバイバル I); 87. Hasshaku-sama Ribaibaru II (八尺様リバイバル II); Special Chapter: Rokuniku Pāti Naito (鹿肉パーティナイト)
17	November 12, 2026	978-4-301-00872-9	—	—

=== Anime ===
The 12-episode anime television series produced by Liden Films and Felix Film was announced on March 5, 2020. It was directed and written by Takuya Satō. Ayumi Nishihata designed the characters, and Takeshi Watanabe composed the series' music. The series aired from January 4 to March 22, 2021, on AT-X, Tokyo MX, SUN, and BS11. The opening theme song is "Ugly Creature" (醜い生き物, Minikui Ikimono) performed by CHiCO with HoneyWorks, while the ending theme song is "You & Me" performed by Miki Satō.

Funimation licensed the series and streamed it on its website in North America and the British Isles, in Europe (minus Germany) through Wakanim, and in Australia and New Zealand through AnimeLab. On November 14, 2021, Funimation announced the series would receive an English dub, which premiered the following day. Following Sony's acquisition of Crunchyroll, the series was moved to Crunchyroll. In Germany, the series is licensed by KSM Anime. Medialink has licensed the series in Southeast Asia and South Asia, and streamed it on their Ani-One YouTube channel and Bilibili in Southeast Asia.

==== Episodes ====
No.	Title (Note: All English titles are taken from Funimation.)	Directed by	Written by	Original release date
1	"Wiggle-Waggle Hunting"; Transliteration: "Kunekune Hantingu" (Japanese: くねくねハンティング)	Tomoe Makino	Takuya Satō	January 4, 2021
College student Sorawo Kamikoshi is trapped in a bog pool in another world, afraid she'll die alone, when another woman named Toriko Nishina stumbles across her and pulls her out. The two then encounter a monster called a "Wiggle-Waggle" that will supposedly turn them insane if they look at it for too long. Toriko throws some rock salt at the monster and it turns into a strange cube with reflective surfaces. The next day, in the real world, Toriko tracks down Sorawo and asks her to help hunt more Wiggle-Waggles to sell them to a specialized researcher. After encountering another Wiggle-Waggle, the rock salt does not work, and neither does the pistol that Toriko carries with her. After staring at the Wiggle-Waggle for several seconds, Sorawo perceives the real form of the monster long enough for Toriko's pistol to shoot it.
2	"Surviving Lady Hasshaku"; Transliteration: "Hasshaku-sama Sabaibaru" (Japanese: 八尺様サバイバル)	Kōji Aritomi	Takuya Satō	January 11, 2021
After the events of their last trip to the "Otherside", Sorawo's right eye now turns blue and Toriko's left hand turns translucent at random. The two head off to sell their mysterious cube to a girl named Kozakura, who specializes in Otherside phenomena and pays handsomely for the cube, but has no solution for their recent body modifications. Toriko tells Sorawo that she's raising money to fund her Otherside expeditions to find her friend Satsuki, who disappeared in the recent past. Back in the Otherside, the two encounter a man who has been looking for his missing wife, and claims that the Otherside has been sending agents into their own reality for some nefarious purpose. The man wanders into a building with Toriko and Sorawo notices a woman who looks like "Hasshaku-sama", but the man thinks she is his missing wife and disappears after touching her. Sorawo suddenly awakens to realize the Hasshaku-sama has been using her feelings for Toriko against her. Sorawo and Toriko then team up to banish Hasshaku-sama and escape the Otherside.
3	"Big-Head Village"; Transliteration: "Kyotō no Mura" (Japanese: 巨頭の村)	Yūta Takamura	Iori Miyazawa	January 18, 2021
Sorawo tries to sort through her feelings about Toriko when the two of them return to the Otherside to visit a shack that Satsuki might have used in the past. As they travel through the Otherside, they remember the man's warnings about "glitches" and toss rocks along the path to ensure they do not die from a wrong step. Eventually, the two come across a desolate village, though Sorawo notices an offering of rice left in the recent past in one of the houses. Suddenly, Sorawo and Toriko are on the run from "Big Heads", insect-like monsters with big heads who chase them in large numbers. Sorawo spots a shrine that provides an emergency exit back to the real world and escapes with Toriko.
4	"Space, Time, and a Middle-Aged Man"; Transliteration: "Jikan, Kūkan, Ossan" (Japanese: 時間、空間、おっさん)	Michita Shiraishi	Yoriko Tomita	January 25, 2021
Sorawo receives a warning from the "Space-Time Man", an Otherside being, taking the form of a middle-aged man, not to investigate the Otherside any further or she'll be trapped there forever. Later at a cafe, Sorawo asks Toriko if Satsuki is even still alive after three months in the Otherside. Toriko abruptly leaves to go to the Otherside herself. The next day, Sorawo visits Kazakura to tell her about recent events, when Kozakura notices a picture of Satsuki on her phone. Suddenly, some strange people start banging on Kozakura's door. Kozakura unlocks a shotgun to face them, and Sorawo discovers that the door has become another portal to the Otherside, taking Kozakura with her by accident. Sorawo ignores a repeated warning from the Space-Time Man and navigates through some strange plant-like monsters to find Toriko in a copy of her apartment. Toriko believes she has finally found Satsuki, but Sorawo sees another monster and keeps firing Kozakura's shotgun at it until it disappears.
5	"Station February"; Transliteration: "Sutēshon Feburarī" (Japanese: ステーション・フェブラリー)	Takanori Yano	Toshizō Nemoto	February 1, 2021
Sorawo and Toriko hold an "apology dinner" for Kozakura at a restaurant in Ikebukuro, though Kozakura leaves immediately after running up a large tab. Toriko reveals she kept Hasshaku-sama's hat from their previous adventure, and tries it on in front of Sorawo. As Sorawo tries to split the check, the waiter speaks in cryptic nonsense. Soon after that, Sorawo and Toriko find themselves slipped back into the Otherside, and are soon chased by a giant metal monster carrying wrapped human bodies. As Sorawo and Toriko stumble across some train tracks, they are saved by Lieutenant Drake leading some United States Marines from the Pale Horse Battalion, stationed in Okinawa until they somehow shifted into the Otherside a month ago during an exercise. The metal monster chasing them was formerly a robotic pack mule that got caught in a "bear trap" and abandoned, but somehow grew sentient and started killing some of the Marines. Drake escorts the girls back to their outpost near Station February, a small train station that somehow has electric power.
6	"The Meat Train"; Transliteration: "Mīto Torein" (Japanese: ミート・トレイン)	Takeshi Tomita	Toshizō Nemoto	February 8, 2021
Sorawo and Toriko meet with Major Ray Barker, the acting commander of the outpost. After being trapped near the train station for over a month, several men in the Pale Horse Company were decimated. The unit offers the two girls an empty tent. Drake warns the girls not to use their phones, but Sorawo decides to call Kozakura anyway. However, halfway through the call, Kozakura starts yelling nonsense in a different voice. Suddenly, the outpost is attacked by an entire pack of "face dogs", a long body of blue ghostly faces that seems to ignore the Marines' gunfire and mortar shells. Toriko picks up an unused Mk 14 EBR and Sorawo manages to shoot the monster in its weak point with her help, but Sorawo loses her color contact during the battle and accidentally reveals her blue eye. Toriko and Sorawo run to the station and manage to jump on "The Meat Train" before the Marines catch them. Though the two girls are scared by what they find on board, they manage to return to their normal world. Meanwhile, Kozakura doesn't understand why Sorawo started talking nonsense halfway through their call.
7	"Resort Night at the World's Edge"; Transliteration: "Hate no Hamabe no Rizōto Naito" (Japanese: 果ての浜辺のリゾートナイト)	Kana Kawana	Yasunori Ide	February 15, 2021
After a night of drunken revelry, Sorawo and Toriko find themselves at a beach resort in Okinawa. Even though Toriko wants to continue their impromptu vacation, Sorawo insists they take a cab back home. However, the two girls fall asleep after seeing a strange hermit crab, and wake up at a beach on the Otherside with the cab in ruins. The two decide to make the best of their situation and enjoy the beach on the Otherside with their swimsuits, their guns, and what few supplies they brought with them. Soon after, they hear a man cry for help as he is being beaten up by bullies, who then attack the girls, but Sorawo puts them down with her gun, revealing that they are really monsters from the Otherside. As night falls on the beach, the girls find themselves nearly overwhelmed by monsters until Sorawo remembers packing Hasshaku-sama's hat. Sorawo guides Toriko and uses the hat to send them back to their world on a beach in Okinawa. Sorawo looks up and sees an image of a woman that appears to be Satsuki before the portal closes.
8	"Attack of the Ninja Cats"; Transliteration: "Neko no Ninja ni Osowareru" (Japanese: 猫の忍者に襲われる)	Tomoe Makino	Takayo Ikami	February 22, 2021
In the university cafeteria, Sorawo is approached by a freshman student named Akari Seto, who claims she is being stalked and attacked by "ninja cats". Sorawo and Toriko have trouble believing her at first, but after chatting with each other and Kozakura, Sorawo tells Toriko she is really afraid of having to shoot cats on the Otherside. The two girls decide to meet Akari in a café, and suddenly find themselves in a dimension between the real world and the Otherside where the entire town has been transformed into a cat town. Akari uses her karate skills to defend Sorawo and Toriko tries to shoot the cats, but none of the girls are able to hit them. Sorawo sees a mysterious object in Akari's chest with her blue eye, and gets Toriko to pull it out, revealing a good luck charm Akari forgot she had. After throwing it away, the ninja cats lose interest in them, and a bunch of white cats smother them. After the girls wake up in the real world, Akari remembers the charm was a gift from her former tutor, Uruma-sensei, less than a year ago. Toriko recognizes Uruma as the surname of Satsuki.
9	"Mrs. Sannuki and Karateka"; Transliteration: "Sannuki-san to Karateka-san" (Japanese: サンヌキさんとカラテカさん)	Michita Shiraishi	Takayo Ikami	March 1, 2021
Akari meets Sorawo and Toriko at Kozakura's house with another request: her childhood friend Natsumi Ichikawa saw a talking monkey in her yard a few days ago, who gave her some teeth. Sorawo quickly figures out it is similar to the urban legend of Kano Sannuki, who would give additional teeth if they were buried in the backyard. However, Natsumi threw the teeth away, and ever since then, has been facing misfortune. When Akari takes Sorawo and Toriko to Ichikawa's auto repair shop, Natsumi reveals all the misfortune she has faced. The girls try to dig around for the missing teeth, finding various remains, when Kano Sannuki herself appears and claims that she did not find teeth, so she remotely rips out one each from Natsumi and Akari. Sorawo uses her observation powers to convince Akari her karate will work on Kano Sannuki, and she quickly beats up the evil woman until she disappears. Back at Kozakura's house, Akari mentions that Sorawo would look like Satsuki with longer hair, making Sorawo wonder if Toriko had ulterior motives for her earlier suggestion.
10	"How to Get to the Barbeque Restaurant by Elevator"; Transliteration: "Erebētā de Yakiniku ni Iku Hōhō" (Japanese: エレベーターで焼肉に行く方法)	Kōji Aritomi	Iori Miyazawa	March 8, 2021
Sorawo receives a call from Toriko inviting her to a Japanese barbeque restaurant along with Kozakura and Akari. Once Sorawo arrives there, she and Toriko have a conversation. Akari then calls to let them know that she got off on a weird floor inside the building. When she claims to see them, Sorawo realizes that Akari is at the In-Between. Kozakura arrives just as Sorawo and Toriko decide to rescue Akari. When the trio finally catches up with her, she explains that she was wandering around because she thought Sorawo was ahead of her. Suddenly, they are confronted by a mysterious entity, which forces them to flee to the elevator. Once Sorawo regains consciousness, she sees Satsuki. She then uses Toriko's hand to return to the real world, much to everyone's relief.
11	"Operation Rescue U.S. Forces"; Transliteration: "Kisaragi Eki Beigun Kyūshutsu Sakusen" (Japanese: きさらぎ駅米軍救出作戦)	Yūta Takamura	Toshizō Nemoto	March 15, 2021
Sorawo and Toriko tells Kozakura they need her help so they can rescue the Marines at Kisaragi Station. At the café, they explain that they will wait until she leaves before they use Hasshaku-sama's hat to reach the Otherside. After a while, Sorawo and Toriko successfully meet back up with the Marines where they learn what has happened since they left. Once everyone returns to the camp, they stock up on ammunition and supplies before the operation commences. While they are on the move, Sorawo uses her eye to spot glitches. However, when they come across some enemies, everyone opens fire, which has no effect. Sometime later, when they reach the area believed to be the entry point, Drake becomes terrified. When Sorawo and Toriko go ahead to scout the area, they find Kakandara.
12	"Sorawo and Toriko"; Transliteration: "Sorao to Toriko" (Japanese: 空魚と鳥子)	Tomoe Makino	Yoriko Tomita; Takuya Satō	March 22, 2021
The Marines catch up with Sorawo and Toriko and everyone open fire on Kakandara, which has no effect thanks to her transformation. Toriko then hits her with an armored vehicle thanks to Sorawo's distraction. The combined effort ultimately leads to Kakandara's defeat. Afterwards, the Marines head back to the real world while the girls decide to stay behind. Sometime later, they return to Kozakura's house where they find a gate nearby. Sorawo and Toriko then enter it just before Akari arrives to greet them. Once they reach the Otherside, the girls reminisce about their first meeting before they head back to the real world to hang out with Kozakura and Akari.

== Reception ==
Constance Sarantos of CBR says that the series breaks the mold of the yuri genre, avoiding common stereotypes of the genre and creating a unique narrative, defying, in their view, "expectations for a yuri anime" as it delves into the horror genre and has a "Relationship built on crime and survival" rather than a slice of life about "interpersonal romantic drama." Sarantos also said that the series shows how well the sci-fi and yuri genres can mix, combining themes of fear and romance, something which is not often used in yuri anime, with the protagonists having to "work together to defeat frightening foes". Even so, Sarantos stated that while the anime does not "deconstruct the yuri genre" it shares storyboarding which "emphasizes intimate moments and loneliness" with Bloom Into You, Just Call it Love, Fragtime, Liz and the Blue Bird, and Adachi and Shimamura, among others, utilizing the "emotional scenery one would expect from a yuri series". In that respect, Sarantos said that it is similar to Kemono Friends and Girls' Last Tour, adding that there is an expectation it will "nail the aesthetic of yuri" even though it is an "unconventional yuri narrative".

Reviewers for Anime News Network shared the sentiment of Sarantos. Caitlin Moore called the series "one of a kind" and a welcome addition to a series of yuri anime about "teenagers falling blushingly in love for the first time", with neither of the protagonists, Sorawo or Toriko, based on stereotypes. Even so, Moore said that the chemistry between them "could have come through stronger", called the visuals a "mixed bag" and said that there has been "a real lack of queer genre fiction in anime" recently, meaning she is "all the more excited to explore it". James Beckett, on the other hand, said that he was only lukewarm to the anime and said that while he is "not asking the show to answer all of my questions upfront", he would like "a little more context" and that he hopes that it "manages to live up to its potential". Similarly, Nicholas Dupree said that he feels the show lost him the premiere, even while he called the two protagonists a "charming central couple", and cannot "click with the episode as a whole" while Theron Martin was more positive, saying that the series could be "worth watching" just for the interactions between the two protagonists. Just as positive was Rebecca Silverman, saying that the series was fascinating and creepy, saying it will likely be a faithful adaptation of the yuri manga it is based on, while saying there are "a few little missteps" and would like to know more "about the whole urban legend/internet myths piece" too. Hannah Alton of CBR argued that the series stands apart from the "usual fare" of the isekai genre because it is a yuri series, with the protagonists not trapped in the other world, but can easily move from the real world to the fictional world known as the Otherside, with the danger within the Otherside, which is "populated by monsters from Japanese urban legends" which cannot be killed unless someone looks directly at them.

Alton further says the two protagonists stand out in the genre, with Sorawo as a college student who "keeps to herself" and Toriko who is experienced at using a gun, something which violates existing Japanese law, which tightly controls firearms. Alton concludes by saying that while the anime falls into the isekai genre, it is different "from the usual high fantasy adventures in empowerment." Others have praised the anime, along with Moyasimon and Genshiken, saying that this prove that college anime can "offer a different take on "coming of age" storylines than the standard high school tropes" while focusing on "serious adult issues" like interpersonal conflict, struggles over identity, and mental health. Additionally, Christopher Farris reviewed the anime's fourth episode for Anime News Network, noting that the vibes and ideas of the episode fit the series, while pointing to inconsistencies with the storytelling, and stating that within the theme of fear, everything else "works wonderfully", praising the sound design and how it taps into people's fears. Jordan Ramée of GameSpot praised the anime for starring adults, unlike most anime, calling it a "a refreshingly wonderful series" which has a "pretty cute and wholesome romance".

Erica Friedman had a mixed view of Otherside Picnic, which she reviewed on her blog, Okazu. She praised the novel series as "an overt mix of Japanese netlore, science fiction, action and horror tropes and a big scoop of Yuri", but she was a "little disappointed" in the anime, specifically criticizing the animation style, disliking what she described as "comedy-action" in the series, and the pacing. Even so, she called the anime "very enjoyable" and praised the voice acting as "superb". Ultimately, she called the animation "unsatisfying", said the story was not "compelling", criticized what she saw as "pointless service" in the series, and said that the anime "feels like a children's version of the novels", giving the anime an overall rating of 7 out of 10.

Silverman reviewed the Otherside Picnic manga for Anime News Network, writing that it does not have "some of the issues that plagued the anime version", with more of a focus on horror, and gives readers "a little more yuri", saying it tells a unique story while "remaining true to the source novels". She argued that it feels like a "a statement on the isekai craze of recent years," and concluded it was a "solid adaptation...worth reading all on its own."
