= Linda Young =

American voice actress

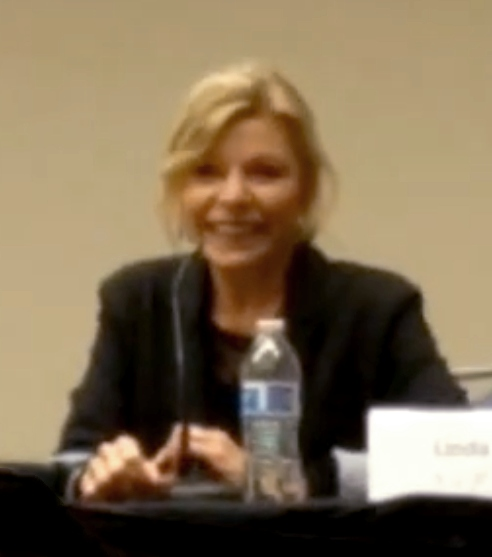
- Young at Animazement 2017
- Born: Milwaukee, Wisconsin, U.S.
- Occupation: Voice actress
- Years active: 1980s–present
- Children: John Burgmeier

Linda Chambers-Young is an American voice actress who voices characters in Japanese anime series. Her most notable roles are Frieza in Dragon Ball Z and Uranai Baba in Dragon Ball as well as Genkai in Yu Yu Hakusho.

Her son John Burgmeier works alongside her.

== Dubbing roles ==
=== Anime ===
- Attack on Titan – Moses's Mother (Ep. 1)
- Black Butler II – Elderly Japanese Women (Ep. 4)
- Black Cat – Madame Freesia (Ep. 15)
- Blassreiter – Chancellor (Ep. 18)
- Burst Angel – Dr. Quinn (Ep. 22–23)
- C – Control – The Money and Soul of Possibility – Hanabi's Mother (Ep. 9)
- Case Closed – Samantha, Clarissa Bunn, Katherine Sinclair
- Chainsaw Man – Zombie Devil (Ep. 1)
- Dragon Ball – Baba, Arale Norimaki
- Dragon Ball GT – Frieza
- Dragon Ball Z – Frieza, Baba (Ep. 7–34)
- Dragon Ball Z Kai – Frieza (Ep. 1), Baba
- Dragon Ball Super – Baba (Ep. 94), Piiza (eps 13–15, 42)
- Fairy Tail – Porlyusica
- Fullmetal Alchemist: Brotherhood – Shan
- Fruits Basket (2019) – Female Coworker 1A, Saki's Grandmother
- The Galaxy Railways – Kinuko Asai
- Ghost Hunt – Hiroe Yoshimi (Ep. 22, 24)
- Gunslinger Girl -Il Teatrino – Izabella D'Angelo (Ep. 6)
- Hell Girl – Tsugumi's Grandmother (Ep. 22)
- Kamisama Kiss – Elderly Woman (Ep. 1, uncredited)
- Michiko & Hatchin – Fortune Teller (Ep. 3, uncredited)
- Mushishi – Shirasawa (Ep. 3)
- My Bride Is a Mermaid – Narrator
- Nichijou – Apartment, Narrator Ep. 4
- Once Upon a Witch's Death – Faust
- One Piece – Slave 1134 (Ep. 420)
- One Piece – Movie: Strong World – Xiao's Grandmother
- Rurouni Kenshin (film) – Townsperson
- Rurouni Kenshin: Kyoto Inferno – Grieving Woman
- Shiki – Ikumi Ito
- Trapped in a Dating Sim: The World of Otome Games is Tough for Mobs – Zola
- Yu Yu Hakusho – Genkai
- Zenshu – Baobab

=== Video games ===
- Dragon Ball series – Frieza (2002–2009), Baba, Fasha
- Yu Yu Hakusho: Dark Tournament – Genkai
