= Spiral: The Bonds of Reasoning =

Japanese manga series and its adaptations

- The first volume of Spiral: The Bonds of Reasoning as released by Square Enix

スパイラル―推理の絆 (Supairaru: Suiri no Kizuna)
- Genre: Mystery, thriller
- Manga
- Written by: Kyo Shirodaira
- Illustrated by: Eita Mizuno
- Published by: Enix (1999-2003); Square Enix (2003-2005)
- English publisher: NA: Yen Press
- Magazine: Monthly Shōnen Gangan
- Original run: 1999 – 2005
- Volumes: 15
- Manga

Spiral: Alive
- Written by: Kyo Shirodaira
- Illustrated by: Eita Mizuno
- Published by: Square Enix
- Magazine: Gangan Wing; Monthly Shōnen Gangan
- Original run: May 2001 – June 2008
- Volumes: 5
- Anime television series
- Directed by: Shingo Kaneko
- Written by: Natsuko Takahashi
- Music by: Akira Mitake
- Studio: J.C.Staff
- Licensed by: AUS: Madman Entertainment; NA: Funimation (expired); UK: MVM Films
- Original network: TXN (TV Tokyo)
- English network: US: Funimation Channel, Colours TV
- Original run: October 1, 2002 – March 25, 2003
- Episodes: 25

Spiral: The Bonds of Reasoning (Japanese: スパイラル〜推理の絆, Hepburn: Supairaru: Suiri no Kizuna) is a Japanese manga series written by Kyo Shirodaira and illustrated by Eita Mizuno. It was published by Enix and then Square Enix in Monthly Shōnen Gangan from 1999 to 2005 and collected in 15 bound volumes. The series focuses on Ayumu Narumi and his efforts to solve the mystery of the Blade Children, cursed geniuses with cat-like eyes lacking a seventh rib bone. A prequel series, Spiral: Alive, was published in Gangan Wing and Monthly Shōnen Gangan from April 2004 to June 2008 and collected in five bound volumes. Yen Press acquired the license for Northern American release, and published the series from October 2007 to April 2011.

The series was adapted as a twenty-five episode anime television series broadcast on TV Tokyo and its affiliates from October 1, 2002, until March 25, 2003. The anime is licensed in Region 1 by Funimation, who released it on DVD and broadcast it on the Funimation Channel, along with the programming block on Colours TV in 2006. The series was also adapted as four light novels and a series of CD dramas.

== Plot ==
=== Spiral: The Bonds of Reasoning ===
About two years ago, Ayumu Narumi's older brother Kiyotaka, a famous detective and pianist, mysteriously disappears without a trace. Ayumu's only clue as to his brother's whereabouts is the phrase "Blade Children", the only words Ayumu could make out in Kiyotaka's final phone call. Now in his freshman year of high school, Ayumu becomes involved in solving a series of murders, crimes, and other incidents, all related to the Blade Children. Together with his school's journalist, Hiyono Yuizaki, and the unwilling assistance of his sister-in-law, Madoka, Ayumu tries to figure out who the Blade Children are and what are their goals.

The Blade Children are the central mystery of the series, known only as cursed children that few know about and are being pursued by so-called Hunters. They are distinguished by their cat-like eyes (though a few lack this feature) and by missing the seventh right rib bone. As Ayumu investigates them, he meets five Blade Children Kousuke Asazuki, Rio Takeuchi, Eyes Rutherford, Ryoko Takamachi, and Kanone Hilbert, and is tested in various ways by them. Those who meet him eventually conclude, some more reluctantly than others, that Ayumu does have what it takes to "save" the Blade Children, as they say Kiyotaka claims.

The anime series, which adapts the story through the sixth volume of the manga, compares the Blade Children to cuckoo birds, having been deposited in human "nests" to be raised, and suggesting that cuckoos go violently crazy toward the end of their lives. The manga continues the story, depicting Ayumu's discoveries about the origin of the Blade Children, their relationship with Kiyotaka, and why his older brother thinks Ayumu might be their savior.

Some thirty years ago, a man called Yaiba Mizushiro was born with one rib missing from his right ribcage. Like Kiyotaka, he excelled at everything he chose to put his mind to. When he turned twenty-three, Yaiba started his own secret society, which swiftly grew powerful enough to manipulate world events. Citing boredom, Yaiba initiated the "Blade Children Project": using in vitro techniques and his DNA, he created eighty children, and had a rib removed from each of them at birth as a mark of their relationship to Yaiba. These Blade Children were cursed in the same way Yaiba was: they would grow up as geniuses in their own right, but one day their blood would awaken murderously and take over their self-will, becoming Avatars of Yaiba. Yaiba's organization split into three parties over the Blade Children Project:

- The Savers supported Yaiba's goals and desire to create more Blade Children. With Yaiba's death, they sought to protect the fact the future had not been determined yet.
- The Watchers were neutral, wanting to observe the first batch of Children and gather results first.
- The Hunters were against Yaiba, and tried multiple times to assassinate him, but repeatedly failed. After Yaiba's death, they worked to eliminate the Blade Children because of their potentially dangerous natures.

When Yaiba was thirty-six, a Japanese man came out of nowhere and easily killed him: Kiyotaka Narumi, Yaiba's counterpart—if Yaiba had been a destroyer, Kiyotaka was a creator. Yaiba had intended to remake the world literally in his own image; with his death, the Blade Children project was halted. Kiyotaka had his hands full trying to stop the Hunters from killing the Blade Children, while trying to check the Savers at the same time.

Just as Kiyotaka and Yaiba were linked, Ayumu eventually meets his own counterpart: Hizumi Mizushiro, Yaiba's younger brother, and the one who will awaken the blood of the remaining Blade Children. As Ayumu learns of this and becomes friends with Hizumi, he comes to accept that his own powers are as strong as Kiyotaka's and his role as the savior of the Blade Children, leading to a final confrontation.

=== Spiral: Alive ===
Spiral: Alive is centered on a girl, Imari Sekiguchi, who falls in love with Shirou Sawamura, a boy who wants to become a detective. However, before Imari can confess to him, he unexpectedly quits school to pursue Kiyotaka Narumi. Imari learns that he also is dating Yukine Amanae, a beautiful girl at their school, and both Shirou and Imari are unaware that Yukine is actually a reluctant murderer. Meanwhile, Toru Saiki, a member of the Police Department's First Investigations Department, investigates the mysterious murders connected with Amanae and is unwilling to bring in Kiyotaka, believing that Tokyo's greatest detective is more demonic than divine. Imari, Shirou, and Saiki become involved in events that are mysteriously connected to the Blade Children. Several characters from the original series return, including Kiyotaka, Kousuke, Ryoko, Kanone, and Madoka.

The series reveals that of the eighty original Blade Children watched by the Hunters, Savers, and Watchers, thirteen have been completely erased from their lists of Blade Children. The one responsible for this had been a neutral party who committed suicide after accomplishing this. The only information about the thirteen missing Blade Children is contained in the Mikanagi File, named after Professor Isabel Mikanagi, who was responsible for their disappearance. With Professor Mikanagi's death, the file was entrusted to her associates, Yukine's parents. After their deaths as the result of a Hunter's actions, Yukine survived and currently holds in her memory the only record of the Mikanagi File.

== Main characters ==
Ayumu Narumi (鳴海歩, Narumi Ayumu)
The protagonist of Spiral, Ayumu is very intelligent, but is very introverted and has a lot of self-doubt. He fears that he cannot surpass his own perfect older brother and doubts himself to the point where he no longer believes he can do anything anymore without acting like his brother. He is a talented pianist like Kiyotaka, an excellent cook, and cares a lot for his sister-in-law Madoka. He had an affection toward Madoka, but stopped when Kiyotaka married Madoka. It also said as a fact, from Kiyotaka, that Hiyono was his most important person. Ayumu is also the supposed only hope for the Blade Children and their survival. Voiced by: Kenichi Suzumura (Japanese); Daniel Katsük (English)
Hiyono Yuizaki (結崎ひよの, Yuizaki Hiyono)
The infamous school journalist, Hiyono is the bubbly and energetic sidekick of Ayumu, always stuck to his side. Very clever and a quick-thinker, her confidence borders dangerously on overconfidence. She is extroverted and is Ayumu's polar opposite, serving as one of the series' few comic-relief characters. Her skill with computers are as amazing as her hacking abilities and she has access to over one hundred resources. She blackmails Wataya often, and is very fond of Ayumu's cooking. Hiyono is also one of the few who whole-heartedly believe in Ayumu; she also has a great deal of faith, feelings, and loyalty in him that carries on for the whole series. She attends Tsukiomi High School alongside Ayumu Narumi. Later on, she is revealed to actually be a spy set out by Kiyotaka to befriend Narumi and help him out. She has also lied about her age, she is actually older than what she has said. Voiced by: Masumi Asano (Japanese); Caitlin Glass (English)
Eyes Rutherford (アイズ·ラザフォード)
The 17-year-old world-class pianist, and he is second only to Kiyotaka Narumi, Ayumu Narumi's older brother. He is one of the Blade Children, Eyes is a quarter English and debuted in the musical world at the age of 14. He cares a great deal about the Blade Children and would do anything for them to survive at all costs. He is exceedingly loyal to Kiyotaka's words and seems to believe in Ayumu the most because after all, he is the clone of Kiyotaka Narumi. Eyes knows much more than the other Blade Children do, holding secrets he keeps to himself. Voiced by: Akira Ishida (Japanese); John Burgmeier (English)
Kanone Hilbert (カノン·ヒルベルト)
A Blade Child with a dual personality. He could be cute and friendly or manipulative and insane. He was very close to Eyes. He would cry for Eyes when Eyes could not when they were young, but their friendship fell apart as they grew older and developed vastly different opinions on the fate of the Blade Children. Kanone will go as far as he can to kill the people who give the Blade Children false hope, to prove to Eyes and the Blade Children they have no hope. Kanone is even willing to work with the Hunters to prove to the Blade Children that they have no hope. He does not believe that the Blade Children can be saved from their fates. Later on in the manga he regains his sanity and believes that Ayumu can save the Blade Children from a horrible fate. Just when he finally believes they can all be saved Hizumi kills him, he tells Ayumu to use his death as an opportunity. He also is an expert in fighting, he taught all the introduced Blade Children how to fight. Voiced by: Kenji Nojima (Japanese); Christopher Bevins (English)
Hizumi Mizushiro (ミズシロ 火澄, Mizushiro Hizumi)
He only appears in the manga; and is the 'younger brother' of Yaiba Mizushiro. Hizumi is the complete opposite of Ayumu in many ways. He is sinister and manipulative, though he and Ayumu got along very well upon their initial meeting. Supposedly he is a very dangerous adversary for Ayumu. He has a personality similar to that of Kanone. He is energetic and has an innocent nature about him. He always smiles and is usually well liked by people unrelated to the Blade Children, but that is actually a cover-up for his true personality; he is a desperate and lonely child who knows only despair.

== Media ==
=== Manga ===
Spiral: The Bonds of Reasoning was serialized by Enix in Monthly Shōnen Gangan magazine from 1999 to 2005, and collected in 15 tankōbon. The manga was licensed in North America in 2005 by Tokyopop, with the first volume initially scheduled for release October 2005. The series was never published and Tokyopop dropped the license. The license was later acquired by Yen Press in 2007. Yen Press released the first volume in October 2007, releasing the remaining volumes quarterly, with the final volume in April 2011.

Spiral: Alive, a prequel and spin off of the original series, also written by Shirodaira and illustrated by Mizuno, began publishing in the May 2001 issue of Gangan Wing. In 2006, the series moved to Monthly Shōnen Gangan, where it ended in June 2008. It has been collected in five bound volumes.

==== Volume list ====
===== Spiral: The Bonds of Reasoning =====
No.	Original release date	Original ISBN	North American release date	North American ISBN
1	February 22, 2000	978-4-7575-0175-1	October 17, 2007	978-0-7595-2341-8
1. "The Invisible Hand on the Landing (Part I)" (踊り場の見えざる手（前編）, Odoriba no Miezarute (Zenpen)); 2. "The Invisible Hand on the Landing (Part II)" (踊り場の見えざる手（後編）, Odoriba no Miezarute (Kōhen)); 3. "Apollo's Arrow" (アポロンの矢, Aporon no Ya); 4. "Room Behind the Ward Lock (Part I)" (ウォード錠の密室（前編）, Wōdo Shō no Misshitsu (Zenpen)); 5. "Room Behind the Ward Lock (Part II)" (ウォード錠の密室（中編）, Wōdo Shō no Misshitsu (Chūhen))
2	July 22, 2000	978-4-7575-0271-0	January 9, 2008	978-0-7595-2407-1
6. "Room Behind the Ward Lock (Part III)" (ウォード錠の密室（後編）, Wōdo Shō no Misshitsu (Kōhen)); 7. "Explosion Adventure" (爆弾太平記, Bakudan Taiheiki); 8. "The Painful Rib" (痛む肋骨, Itamu Abarabone); 9. "The Joy of a Believer (Part I)" (信じる者の幸福（前編）, Shinjiru Mono no Kōfuku (Zenpen)); 10. "The Joy of a Believer (Part II)" (信じる者の幸福（後編）, Shinjiru Mono no Kōfuku (Kōhen))
3	December 20, 2000	978-4-7575-0370-0	April 22, 2008	978-0-7595-2637-2
11. "A Boy's Strength" (少年の力, Shōnen no Chikara); 12. "Versus Rio" (VS理緒, Vāsesu Rio); 13. "Throw Off the Encompassing Net" (包囲網を抜けよ, Hōimō o Nukeyo); 14. "The Choice of the Non-Believer" (信じぬ者の選択, Shinjinu Mono no Sentaku)
4	June 22, 2001	978-4-7575-0468-4	July 15, 2008	978-0-7595-2834-5
15. "The Choice of the Believer" (信じる者の選択, Shinjiru Mono no Sentaku); 16. "A Day Full of Losers" (敗者ばかりの日, Haisha bakari no Hi); 17. "Flash of Lightning at Five o'Clock" (五時の稲妻, Go-ji no Inazuma); 18. "Cold Equation" (冷たい方程式, Tsumetai Hōteishiki); 19. "All That You Can Do" (きみにできるあらゆること, Kimi ni Dekiru Arayuru Koto)
5	October 22, 2001	978-4-7575-0557-5	October 28, 2008	978-0-7595-2835-2
20. "The Only Clear Way to Do It" (たったひとつの冴えたやり方, Tattahitotsu no Saeta Yarikata); 21. "Goodnight, Sweetheart" (グッドナイト スイートハーツ, Guddonaito Suītohātsu); 22. "Dry Eyes" (乾いた瞳, Kawaita Hitomi); 23. "Night Falls Again" (夜がまた来る, Yoru ga Mata Kuru); 24. "Moving Target" (動く標的, Ugoku Hyōteki); 25. "Like a Swan" (ライク・ア・スワン, Raiku A Suwan)
6	April 22, 2002	978-4-7575-0678-7	January 6, 2009	978-0-7595-2913-7
26. "Distant Dawn" (遠い夜明け, Tōi Yoake); 27. "Waltz Into Darkness" (暗闇へのワルツ, Kurayami e no Warutsu); 28. "Death Is My Dance Partner" (死はわが踊り手, Shi wa Waga Odorite); 29. "Black Angel" (黒い天使, Kuroi Tenshi); 30. "Black Path of Fear" (恐怖の冥路, Kyōfu no Meiro); 31. "The Seat of He Who Scoffs" (あざける者の座, Azakeru Mono no Za)
7	September 21, 2002	978-4-7575-0790-6	April 30, 2009	978-0-7595-2914-4
32. "The Sound of the Cookie Crumbling" (クッキーの崩れる音, Kūkī no Kuzereru Oto); 33. "Ant in a Glass Box" (ガラス箱のアリ, Garasu Hako no Ari); 34. "Who Knows What the Heavens Will Bring?" (天のさだめを誰が知る, Ten no Sadame o Dare ga Shiru); 35. "La Campanella" (ラ・カンパネラ, Ra Kanpanera); 36. "Lest Darkness Fall" (闇よ落ちるなかれ, Yami yo Ochirunakare)
8	January 22, 2003	978-4-7575-0854-5	July 14, 2009	978-0-7595-2915-1
37. "The Game of Rat and Dragon" (鼠と竜のゲーム, Nezumi to Ryū no Gēmu); 38. "A Scanner Darkly" (暗闇のスキャナー, Kurayami no Sukyanā); 39. "Fratres (Brothers)" (フラトレス（兄弟）, Furatoresu (Kyōdai)); 40. "The Choice of Life" (命の選択を, Inochi no Sentaku o)
9	July 22, 2003	978-4-7575-0982-5	October 27, 2009	978-0-7595-2916-8
41. "Footfall" (降伏の儀式, Dōbuku no Gishiki); 42. "The Mote in God's Eye" (神の目の小さな塵, Kami no Me no Chiisana Chiri); 43. "Time Enough For Love" (愛に時間を, Ai ni Jikan o); 44. "How's Shrödinger's Cat?" (シュレディンガーの猫は元気か, Shuredingā no Neko wa Genki ka); 45. "The Eagle Has Landed" (鷲は舞い降りた, Washi wa Maiorita); Bonus Story. "Great Detective Kiyokata Narumi: Kurumi Kohinata's Challenge" (名探偵鳴海清隆・小日向くるみの挑戦, Meitantei Narumi Kiyotaka – Kohinata Kurumi no Chōsen)
10	December 22, 2003	978-4-7575-1099-9	January 26, 2010	978-0-7595-2917-5
46. "Childhood's End" (幼年期の終わり, Yōnenki no Owari); 47. "Your Battle Song" (きみのたたかいのうた, Kimi no Tatakai no Uta); 48. "To Live Again" (いまひとたびの生を, Ima Hitotabi no Sei o); 49. "Curtain Fall" (カーテン・フォール, Kāten Fōru); 50. "Confessions of a Crap Artist" (戦争が終わり、世界の終わりがはじまった, Sensō ga Owari, Sekai no Owari ga Hajimatta)
11	April 22, 2004	978-4-7575-1186-6	April 20, 2010	978-0-7595-2918-2
51. "Reach For Tomorrow" (明日にとどく, Ashita ni Todoku); 52. "The Immortality Option" (造物主の選択, Zōbutsushu no Sentaku); 53. "Blood Music" (ブラッド・ミュージック, Buraddo Myūjikku); 54. "Untouched by Human Hands" (人間の手がまだ触れない, Ningen no Te ga Mada Furenai); 55. "The Player on the Other Side" (盤面の敵, Banmen no Teki); 56. "As a Non-Believer Despite It All" (されど信じぬ者として, Saredo Shinjinu Mono toshite)
12	August 21, 2004	978-4-7575-1252-8	July 13, 2010	978-0-7595-2919-9
57. "The Two Faces of Tomorrow" (未来の二つの顔, Mirai no Futatsu no Kao); 58. "The Doors of His Face, the Lamps of His Mouth" (その顔はあまたの扉、その口はあまたの灯, Sono Kao wa Amata no Tobira, Sono Kuchi wa Amata no Tomoshi); 59. "The Toynbee Convector" (二人がここにいる不思議, Futari ga Koko ni Iru Fushigi); 60. "And My Fear is Great" (そして私のおそれはつのる, Soshite Watashi no Osore wa Tsunoru); 61. "A Walk in the Sun" (日の下を歩いて』, Hi no Shite o Aruite)
13	April 22, 2005	978-4-7575-1366-2	October 26, 2010	978-0-7595-2920-5
62. "The Divine Invasion" (聖なる侵入, Seinaru Shinyū); 63. "Rustle of Wings" (翼のざわめき, Tsubasa no Zawameki); 64. "With Delicate Mad Hands" (たおやかな狂える手に, Taoyakana Kurueru Te ni); 65. "Towards Zero" (ゼロ時間へ, Zero Jikan e); 66. "The Lost World" (失われた世界, Ushinawareta Sekai)
14	September 22, 2005	978-4-7575-1521-5	January 25, 2011	978-0-7595-2921-2
67. "Twin Paradox" (双子のパラドックス, Futago no Paradokkusu); 68. "Reasons to be Cheerful" (しあわせの理由, Shiawase no Riyū); 69. "Two Skies" (ふたりのそら, Futari no Sora); 70. "The Darkness That Envelops You" (あなた達のくらやみで, Anata-tachi no Kurayami de); 71. "Good-Bye Song (Part I)" (お別れの日にうたう歌（前編）, Owakare no ni Utau Uta (Zenpen))
15	January 21, 2006	978-4-7575-1605-2	April 26, 2011	978-0-7595-2922-9
72. "Good-Bye Song (Part II)" (お別れの日にうたう歌（後編）, Owakare no ni Utau Uta (Kōhen)); 73. "Beyond Babel" (バベルの向こう, Baberu no Mukō); 74. "The Only Sure Thing" (ただひとつ確かなもの, Tada Hitotsu Tashikana Mono); 75. "God's Beautiful World" (神の美しき世界, Kami no Utsukushiki Sekai); 76. "Gently Stick a Feather in Your Cap" (優しく、羽飾りを, Yasashiku, Hane-kazari o); Final Chapter. "Spiral: May You Have As Many Wonderful Days as Possible" (Spiral ～なるべくなら良き日々が多くありますよう～, Supairaru: Narubeku Nara Yoki Hibi Ōku Arimasuyō)

===== Spiral: Alive =====
No.	Release date	ISBN
1	April 22, 2004	978-4-7575-0674-9
2	February 22, 2007	978-4-7575-1948-0
3	September 22, 2007	978-4-7575-2114-8
4	February 22, 2008	978-4-7575-2221-3
5	August 22, 2008	978-4-7575-2355-5

=== Anime ===
Spiral: The Bonds of Reasoning was adapted as a 25-episode anime television series by TV Tokyo with production by J.C.Staff. It adapts the first six volumes of the manga, with a different ending. It was directed by Shingo Kaneko with music by Akira Mitake and character designs by Yumi Nakayama. The series was broadcast from October 1, 2002, to March 25, 2003, and released on nine DVDs between December 18, 2002, and August 27, 2003.

The opening theme was "Kibouhou" ("Cape of Hope") by Strawberry Jam, and the ending theme was "Kakuteru" ("Cocktail") by Hysteric Blue. There was also an insert song, "Twinkle My Heart" by Mitake Akira, which is sung by the character Hiyono Yuizaki. Piano music used during the series includes Jeux d'eau by Maurice Ravel (episode 3), Liebestraume No. 3 by Franz Liszt (played in concert by Eyes Rutherford in episode 13), Benediction de Dieu dans la solitude by Liszt (episode 21; in the manga, this is a significant piece of music for Eyes and Kanone Hilbert), and Arabesque No. 1 by Claude Debussy (episode 25). A soundtrack album was released March 19, 2003.

The series is licensed in Region 1 by Funimation, which has released it on six DVDs and as a box set. Funimation also aired the series, in dubbed format, in the Funimation Channel programming block on Colours TV from June 19, 2006, until August 22, 2006.

No.	Title	Original airdate	U.S. airdate
1	"Spiral of Destiny" "Unmei no Rasen" (運命の螺旋)	October 1, 2002	June 19, 2006
The story begins with Ayumu Narumi getting blamed for pushing Sayoko Shiranagatani off the fifth floor. The crime inspector (his sister-in-law) Madoka and everyone else find him to be the only possible suspect, but he seems unconcerned. Enter, Hiyono Yuizaki, who offers to help him prove his innocence while referring to him as "Mr. Criminal". But at the same time Ayumu is slowly piecing the crime together. He confronts Sonobe, a new teacher at school, and tells him he will unveil his secret. Madoka, Ayumu, Hiyono, and Madoka's assistant find him on the roof and reveal him to be the culprit because he switched the girl's glasses, causing her to fall. But suddenly Sonobe congratulates him ny saying that he wouldn't expect less from Kiyotaka Narumi's brother and runs away after mentioning Blade Children. After giving a small chase the gang finds Sonobe unconscious.
2	"Manor of Death" "Shi no Seijukan" (死の聖樹館)	October 8, 2002	June 20, 2006
A middle-aged woman named Takako Adachi is found dead in Sayoko's house who is later found by her cousin Kei. Ayumu along with Hiyono decide to the house to investigate; they soon find out that the reason Takako was murdered was because she was an agent working undercover for the Hunters. Later on, the true culprit is revealed to be the housekeeper Reiko Hatsuyama, who had killed Takako to protect Sayoko because she's one of the Blade Children and is also the one responsible for attacking Sonobe in the first episode.
3	"Cursed Children" "Norowareta Kodomotachi" (呪われた子供たち)	October 15, 2002	June 21, 2006
A famous pianist named Eyes Rutherford gets Ayumu's attention during an interview on television. Once Ayumu arrived, Rutherford wanted him to play the piano, however Ayumu refused claiming that he lost interest in playing after Kiotaka went missing. Afterwards, Hiyono and Ayumu have to stop a bomb made by Rutherford before explodes. Along with Hiyono's help, Ayumu finally stopped the bomb. The episode ends with Hiyono and Ayumu sitting in the crowd, at Ruthford's concert.
4	"The Happiness of Those Who Believe" "Shinjirumono no Kōfuku" (信じる者の幸福)	October 22, 2002	June 22, 2006
The episode begins as Takashi Sonobe is suddenly killed by Kousuke Asazuki, another Blade Child. Ayumu and Hiyono discover the person who killed Sonobe once they confront him; Ayumu is then forced to play a game with him to guess his card, he guesses right by a trick he used with Kousuke's knife.
5	"Misty Gallows" "Kiri no Shikei dai" (霧の死刑台)	October 29, 2002	June 23, 2006
6	"Blind Spot in the Web" "Houi Ami no Hokaku" (包囲網の死角)	November 5, 2002	June 26, 2006
7	"The Choice of the Nonbeliever" "Shinjinumono no Sentaku" (信じぬ者の選択)	November 12, 2002	June 27, 2006
8	"Day of the Defeated" "Haisho Bakari no hi" (敗者ばかりの日)	November 19, 2002	June 28, 2006
9	"All Things That Are Possible to You" "Kimi ni Dekiru Arayurukoto" (きみにできるあらゆること)	November 26, 2002	June 29, 2006
10	"Only One Wise Action" "Tatta Hitotsu no Saeta Yari Kata" (たった一つの冴えたやり方)	December 3, 2002	June 30, 2006
11	"Goodnight Sweetheart" "Guddonaito Suītohātsu" (グッドナイトスイートハーツ)	December 10, 2002	July 3, 2006
12	"Dry Eyes" "Kawaita Hitomi" (乾いた瞳)	December 17, 2002	July 4, 2006
13	"Overture" "Overture -Jokyoku-" (Overture 〜序曲〜)	December 24, 2002	July 5, 2006
14	"Shimmering Fragrance" "Amaki Kaori Kagerou ni Nite" (甘き香り陽炎に似て!)	January 7, 2003	July 25, 2006
15	"Like a Swan" "Raiku a Suwan" (ライク·ア·スワン)	January 14, 2003	July 26, 2006
16	"Moving Targets" "Marekanezaru Hōmonsho" (まねかれざる訪問者)	January 21, 2003	July 27, 2006
17	"The Watcher in the Darkness" "Kurayami no Sukyanaa" (暗闇のスキャナー)	January 28, 2003	July 28, 2006
18	"The Lamenting Angel" "Nageki no Tenshi" (嘆きの天使)	February 4, 2003	July 31, 2006
19	"Mirror of the Heart" "Kokoro no Kagami" (心の鏡)	February 11, 2003	August 1, 2006
20	"Whispering Shadows" "Sasayaku Kage" (ささやく影)	February 18, 2003	August 2, 2006
21	"The Sound of a Breaking Heart" "Kokoro no Kudakeru Oto" (心の砕ける音)	February 25, 2003	August 3, 2006
22	"The Confession" "Kamen no Kokuhaku" (仮面の告白)	March 4, 2003	August 4, 2006
23	"Relentless Rain" "Yamanai Ame" (止まない雨)	March 11, 2003	August 18, 2006
24	"The Man in the High Castle" "Takai Shiru no Otoko" (高い城の男)	March 18, 2003	August 21, 2006
25	"The Sound of an Iris Freezing and Melting" "Ayame no Ite Toku Oto" (アヤメの凍て解く音)	March 25, 2003	August 22, 2006

== Reception ==
The manga and anime adaptation have been praised for their creation of suspense and good mystery stories. Although the manga has received slight criticism for its blatant display of sexual content.

== See also ==
- In/Spectre, another manga series written by Kyo Shirodaira
