= List of Spiral characters =

Characters of Japanese manga and anime series

This is a list of characters from the Japanese manga and anime series Spiral: The Bonds of Reasoning and its prequel, Spiral: Alive.

== Spiral: The Bonds of Reasoning Characters ==
=== Main characters ===
Ayumu Narumi (鳴海歩, Narumi Ayumu)
The protagonist of Spiral is a freshman high school student of Sukiyomi Academy-(スキヨミ 学園| Sukiyomi Gakuen). Ayumu is very intelligent, but is introverted and has a lot of self-doubt. He fears that he cannot surpass his own perfect older brother and doubts himself to the point where he no longer believes he can do anything anymore without acting like his brother. He is a talented pianist like Kiyotaka, as well as an excellent cook. He cares a lot for his sister-in-law Madoka, whom he had feelings for before his brother married her, some of which still lingers and reflects in how he worries about her. Ayumu is also the supposed only hope for the Blade Children and their survival. Ayumu has a preference for older women, which is alluded to several times. Later in the manga, he tells Kirie that he was going to switch his type of woman to "Someone who I can rely on, even when I am an inconvenience to others", admitting that he needs a girl such as that, implying Hiyono. Hiyono does eventually become a major support in Ayumu's life, and he links her to his happiness.
He is revealed to be a clone of his brother. In fact, he and Hizumi are the first clones to be made, and thus have a very limited life span with many biological complications. Ayumu was created as an 'insurance' for Kiyotaka by his parents. Mrs Narumi was also a pianist before she suffered an accident, resulting in the loss of function of her fingers. She tried numerous treatments to regain the use of her fingers, which eventually led to her fingers becoming almost entirely useless. When Kiyotaka became a pianist, Mrs Narumi decided to create Ayumu to become a 'guinea pig'. If anything should ever happened to Kiyotaka, Ayumu would first undergo treatment to find out whether it was suitable for Kiyotaka. However, at his last concert, Kiyotaka publicly announced that he would give up the piano to become a detective and crushed his fingers on the piano. His mother saw no more use for his clone Ayumu who was often ignored by his parents after that.
In the end, he is hospitalized because of his biological complications. Having lost the use of his left arm, he continues to write music, still adhering to his way of fighting destiny: to live on, creating new opportunities and generating hope under his own power. This is the answer he gives to the Blade Children.
Voiced by: Kenichi Suzumura (Japanese); Daniel Katsük (English)
Kiyotaka Narumi (鳴海清隆, Narumi Kiyotaka)
Ayumu's older brother, who is perfect at everything in the eyes of Ayumu. He became a world-class pianist after the age of ten and then an unimaginable world-class detective at twenty. He married Madoka - but left a year after they married. He is also the real reason why Ayumu always doubts himself, who is constantly comparing himself to him. Kiyotaka left one day after he was researching the mysterious case of the Blade Children. Many assume he is now dead. Ayumu discovers that he is not, after hearing that he has been associated with the Blade Children.
The anime never offers an explanation of his disappearance. In the manga, he is revealed to be the puppeteer behind the scenes, and returns at the very end. He created a situation where Ayumu would lose every last bit of his support, even Hiyono, but Ayumu managed to overcome despair on his own. He lives with Madoka and still controls his organization from Japan. In the anime version of the series, the top part of his face is never shown except for his nose and mouth, while in the manga his face is always visible.
Voiced by: Kazuhiko Inoue (Japanese); Christopher Sabat (English)
Hiyono Yuizaki (結崎ひよの, Yuizaki Hiyono)
The infamous school journalist, Hiyono is the bubbly and energetic sidekick of Ayumu, always stuck to his side. Very clever and a quick-thinker, her confidence borders dangerously on overconfidence. She is extroverted and is Ayumu's polar opposite, serving as one of the series' few comic-relief characters. Her skill with computers are as amazing as her hacking abilities and she has access to over one hundred resources. She blackmails Wataya often, and is very fond of Ayumu's cooking (to the point where she even thinks along with Rio that she wants to become his bride). Hiyono is also one of the few who whole-heartedly believe in Ayumu; she also has a great deal of faith and loyalty in him, and is also hinted by Madoka and herself that she has some feelings for Ayumu.
At the end, it is revealed that Hiyono was also part of Kiyotaka's machinations. The reason she knew so much about individual Blade Children, such as Kanone's foster parents' names, is because Kiyotaka told her. She is in fact several years older than Ayumu (ironically the type of girl he likes), and was hired to become "Hiyono Yuizaki" by Kiyotaka. She was to be Kiyotaka's final trump card—Kiyotaka would reveal her identity to knock away Ayumu's support, which Kiyotaka hoped would drive Ayumu to kill him. She was however unaware of this aspect of her role until near the time of Kiyotaka and Ayumu's confrontation. Despite her playing a role given to her, she does genuinely care about Ayumu. Towards the end of the manga she states that she hates Kiyotaka more than anyone else.
After the final confrontation between Kiyotaka and his clone Ayumu, "Hiyono" left Japan for her next assignment in Germany, for two years. The manga ends with an epilogue where Hiyono is visiting Ayumu in the hospital, where despite his failing body functions, he carries on, composing music in his room. He requests that she listens to him play the piano, and she complies.
At the end of the anime however, the camera view shows a field of purple iris and the viewers can hear Hiyono and Ayumu exchange a few words. Apparently they are on a picnic and Hiyono has packed them lunch. Ayumu takes a bite of her food but doesn't appear to like it very much, ending with Hiyono complaining to him.
Voiced by: Masumi Asano (Japanese); Caitlin Glass (English)
Madoka Narumi (鳴海まどか, Narumi Madoka)
Ayumu's sister-in-law and Kiyotaka's wife, she works as a police detective but is usually outsmarted by Ayumu in most cases. Her investigation skills are remarkable, but because of work she is rarely at home and therefore can do no domestic work. She cares a great deal for Ayumu. She is pretty selfish, not quite aware of the pain her brother-in-law endures because of how much he cares for her since she is his only family now that Kiyotaka has gone missing. Madoka tries to keep Ayumu from getting too involved with the Blade Children, but proves to be another weak spot of Ayumu and is often left in the dark by Ayumu about situations concerning the Blade Children for her own safety.
She lives with Kiyotaka and visits Ayumu in the hospital. Spiral: Alive reveals her maiden name to be Haneoka (羽丘).
Voiced by: Kotono Mitsuishi (Japanese); Gwendolyn Lau (English)
Suemaru Wataya (和田谷末丸, Wataya Suemaru)
A detective in training, he works under Madoka and isn't very smart as he jumps to conclusions without thinking about a situation thoroughly. He is regularly blackmailed by Hiyono and often hangs out with Madoka in a bar.
Voiced by: Bin Shimada (Japanese); Robert McCollum (English)

=== The Blade Children ===
Eyes Rutherford (アイズ・ラザフォード)
A 17-year-old world-class pianist, he is second only to Kiyotaka Narumi, Ayumu Narumi's older brother. He is seemingly cold-hearted but definitely not heartless (he brought Rio melons when she was stuck in the hospital). Eyes is quarter English and debuted in the musical world at the age of 14. He cares a great deal about the Blade Children and would do anything for them to survive at all costs. He is exceedingly loyal to Kiyotaka's words and seems to believe in Ayumu the most out of all the Blade Children. Eyes knows much more than the other Blade Children do, holding secrets he keeps to himself. He is one of the first targets of assassination by the Hunters (after Sayoko Shiranagatani) but outwits them at a charity concert with the help of Ayumu and Kousuke Asazuki. He and Kanone Hilbert have some sort of bond, even though the friendship between Eyes and Kanone seems to shatter once he learned of Kanone's betrayal of the Blade Children. Eyes appears to be the leader of the Blade Children but he treats Kanone as either an equal or even an older brother. Eyes and Kanone are revealed to be half-brothers in chapter 36 of the manga, and later it is revealed that all of the Blade Children are half siblings, for they share the same father.
In the end he concentrates on his piano skills, known as the "savior of the music world." This is the path he chose to create hope for himself.
Voiced by: Akira Ishida (Japanese); John Burgmeier (English)
Kousuke Asazuki (浅月香介, Asazuki Kōsuke)
The most arrogant, aggressive and most violent of all the Blade Children, Kousuke is usually the implementor of assassinations. Kousuke is very strong-willed and stubborn, choosing to fight the Hunters head-on rather than hide from them. He is not afraid to kill and does not really trust Eyes, resulting in arguments between them. It is revealed by Hiyono Yuizaki after his challenge with Ayumu Narumi that Kousuke's mother died in a car accident when he was 3, leaving him orphaned. While Rio Takeuchi calls him stupid, in reality Kousuke is very intelligent; after skipping most of elementary school, he still manages to catch up to secondary school level from reading and learning from books. Kousuke left middle school after a run-in with a teacher. He is a childhood friend of Ryoko Takamachi and harbors deep feelings for her as he goes out of his way to protect her (even jumping into a bear pit she had fallen into to save her). Kousuke's astrological sign is Virgo.
The final path Kousuke chose is "ordinary," in that he goes to college with Ryoko. He becomes the main character in the spin-off, Spiral Alive.
Voiced by: Takeshi Kusao (Japanese); Greg Ayres (English)
Rio Takeuchi (竹内理緒, Takeuchi Rio)
The "midget" of the Blade Children, she resembles a 13-year-old child rather than her actual age, 16. Rio is the youngest Blade Child in the tv show but in the Spiral Alive books she is older the Ryoko. Although Rio appears to be the most innocent of the Blade Children with her cherubic features and size, she is actually very shrewd and calculating. Rio knows how to create bombs, devise difficult plans and kill those she considers her enemies. Kanone even calls her a "fire pixie" in the manga for her small, impish appearance and skill with explosives. She is extremely intelligent and is able to escape from any sticky situation, no matter how small or tight it is. She is very straight-forward and has a crush on Eyes because he gives her "netted pattern" melons (her favorite food). Like Kousuke, she will not hesitate to kill people if she has to.
The path Rio takes is working in third-world countries, defusing land mines left over from war.
Voiced by: Yui Horie (Japanese); Monica Rial (English)
Ryoko Takamachi (高町亮子, Takamichi Ryōko)
One of the most down-to-earth members of the Blade Children; Ryoko is a clever and athletic person, probably the most athletic of the Blade Children. She is a natural-born runner and can outrace almost anyone. She is a childhood friend of Kousuke Asazuki and, unlike some of the other Blade Children, she despises killing. She dislikes Eyes Rutherford due to past issues and cares deeply for Kousuke, though she has a tendency to use him as a punching bag and make him buy her food. Her past is relatively unknown, though it is hinted that something traumatizing happened while Kousuke and Eyes were present. She is reluctantly brought back into the conflict of the Blade Children by Eyes after losing to him in a simple game of dodge ball. She honours their deal to join with the rest of the Blade Children, with only one condition: she will not kill anyone.
The manga reveals that Ryoko is capable to using a gun like the other Blade Children, though she dislikes using one. She is shown to have a strong intuition, being able to determine that Kanone would attempt to kill Rio. Ryoko's apparent feelings for Kousuke are also made more explicit in the manga. She blushes and cries as she hugs him after he wakes from a brief coma and becomes incredibly jealous of Rio when Kousuke stands up for her.
She is still with Kousuke and hopes to run in the Olympics.
Ryoko's surname, Takamachi (高町), is named after the same family in the Magical Girl Lyrical Nanoha franchise.
Voiced by: Hitomi Kato (Japanese); Laura Bailey (English)
Kanone Hilbert (カノン・ヒルベルト)
A Blade Child with a dual personality. He can be cute and friendly or manipulative and insane. He was very close to Eyes. He would cry for Eyes when Eyes could not when they were young, but their friendship fell apart as they grew older and developed vastly different opinions on the fate of the Blade Children. Hiyono Yuizaki confronts Kanone right before Eyes is shown to have woken up. She also knew his favorite food, which is banana bean jam.
In the manga, it also mentions that Kanone and Eyes are "brothers". Kanone will go as far as he can to kill the people who give the Blade Children false hope, to prove to Eyes and the Blade Children they have "no hope." He is capable of terrible things and is interested in killing Ayumu because he is the Blade Children's only hope that they can actually be saved. Kanone is even willing to work with the Hunters to prove to the Blade Children that they have no hope. In the manga, Kanone wants to kill his friends due to the fact that he fears losing them to the Hunters and would rather kill them himself, but his subconscious keeps him from killing them. Kanone, despite his lack of hesitation to kill, has vowed to himself that he would not kill innocent people, and would only kill all the people related with the Blade Children, and the Blade Children themselves. To Kanone, his actions were a form of salvation and punishment for everyone who caused the Blade Children to be born in this world.
In the manga, Kanone has incredible "killer reflexes" so that when he is attacked, or even senses danger, his body will automatically react and set himself up for battle position. Due to his powerful gift, Kanone vows to only kill the Blade Children since he does not want to lose control and go on a killing spree of innocents. These powerful traits and his vow are ultimately his downfall as Ayumu manipulates them to his advantage before hitting him with a tranquilizer.
He has a very close relationship with Eyes, since he is the only one Eyes ever called "big brother". Kanone also has a soft spot for cats, as he buys a kitty plushy in the manga and Rio suggests that they dress like kitties so he won't attack them during the school battle. Hiyono Yuizaki also revealed in her confrontation against Kanone after his attack on the girls, that his especially favorite cat are himalayan cats.
Kanone wishes for Ayumu to kill him - if Ayumu did, he could no longer be the saviour of the Blade Children. After a battle of wits and speed in Tsukiomi Academy, which spans multiple volumes, he is hit with a tranquilizer bullet and subsequently put under house arrest in a secure location. He is visited by Hizumi, and willingly killed by him. This is the path he chose. By killing Kanone, Hizumi's choices are severely limited, and he cannot fight his destiny. Kanone's last word to Ayumu was "Hope", asking Ayumu to have faith in his own path, for this is Ayumu's fate.
Voiced by: Kenji Nojima (Japanese); Christopher Bevins (English)
Sayoko Shiranagatani (白長谷小夜子, Shiranagatani Sayoko)
One of the Blade Children, she was adopted and raised with the hope that she would not suffer like others like her. However, once Sayoko's identity as one of the Blade Children emerged, she is mysteriously pushed off the roof of the school (In the manga, it is Munemiya Kana that is pushed off the roof). Ayumu becomes the first suspect because he was the only one present at the roof at the time, despite the fact he is completely innocent. She survives miraculously after landing on top of a truck and later recovers but suffers from amnesia, though she is happy with her current life and continues to live hopefully. In the manga, she feared something and attempted to commit suicide at age 10 after her mother died. After the attempt, she completely lost her memory. She is said to be different from the other Blade Children. Unlike the other Blade Children, she does not possess the characteristic slit-pupils and appears a lot more naive of the blade children situation.
Voiced by: Mai Nakahara (Japanese); Elise Baughman (English)

=== Supporting characters ===
Takashi Sonobe (ソノベ 高志, Sonobe Takashi)
A 40 year old male teacher at Sukiyomi Academy. He's the first person to witness Sayoko in an unconscious state after she fell off of the roof of the school and was injured from the top of a truck; but in the end it turns out that his teaching position at Ayumu and Hiyono's school is nothing but a ploy, as he's revealed to be working undercover as a Hunter and the one responsible for Sayoko's injuries after he switched her prescription glasses with another pair which made her lose her balance a fall off the roof of the school. With his real motivations revealed, he tries to flea after he mentions somethings about the Blade Children but is soon knocked unconscious by an unknown force. He is later killed by Kousuke in episode 3 after the latter pushed him out of a window of the hospital he was staying in.
Voiced by: Masaya Onosaka (Japanese); Sean Schemmel (English)
Kirie Tsuchiya (土屋 キリエ, Tsuchiya Kirie)
A manga-only character. Kirie is mysterious and ambiguous, a member of the Watchers. She makes her first appearance in Volume Eight of Spiral, and seems to be one of the few people who knows about the secret of the Blade Children. She smokes and has an arrogant personality, but helped an injured Eyes when he was severely wounded after his battle against Kanone.
Ayumu gave her blood samples from himself and Hizumi. Kirie confirms that their DNA is identical to their brothers' (Kiyotaka and Yaiba). Since their ages are so far apart, they cannot be twins. In the end, Kirie acts as liaison between the remaining Blade Children and Ayumu.
Hizumi Mizushiro (ミズシロ 火澄, Mizushiro Hizumi)
A manga only character; Hizumi is the "younger brother" of the Devil Mizushiro Yaiba, father to the Blade Children. Hizumi is the complete opposite of Ayumu in many ways. He is sinister and manipulative, though he and Ayumu got along very well upon their initial meeting. Supposedly he is a very dangerous adversary for Ayumu. He has a personality similar to that of Kanone. He is energetic and seems to have an innocent nature about him. He always smiles and seems well-liked. But that is actually a cover-up for his true personality. Hizumi is a deadly killer and seems to be distraught. He enjoys playing both basketball and his harmonica. It also seems that he enjoys annoying Ayumu. Although he is often mistakenly classified as one of the Blade Children due to his slit-pupils and relation to Yaiba he is not one.
He knows from the beginning that Ayumu and himself are clones, having done research when he was at college. Hizumi often tries to persuade Ayumu that both of them have no hope for the future. He even went to the extent to kill Kanone so that Ayumu would be forced to make a decision whether to be his ally or his enemy. In the end, Ayumu refused to kill Hizumi although Ayumu had the absolute advantage in a fight. Hizumi tries to commit suicide by jumping down from the Tokyo Tower and spends the rest of his life in a hospital where he eventually dies. Before that, he used his own body to test for chemicals and medicine to prolong clones' lives. As a result, his discovery caused Ayumu to live much longer than he was supposed to.
Yaiba Mizushiro (ミズシロ・ヤイバ, Mizushiro Yaiba)
The "father" of the Blade Children, born sixteen years before Kiyotaka and with one rib missing from his right ribcage. Like Kiyotaka, Yaiba excelled at everything he put his mind to. He began a secret society when he was twenty-three years old, which swiftly grew to gigantic proportions and became able to manipulate world events. Citing boredom, Yaiba initiated the "Blade Children Project" in order to literally remake the world in his own image. Using in vitro techniques, he seeded his DNA and created a total of eighty children. These children all had a rib removed at birth to signify them being of Yaiba's blood. They were cursed in the same way Yaiba was: they would grow up as geniuses in their own right, but one day their blood would awaken murderously and take over their self-will, becoming avatars of Yaiba. The project caused a split amongst his followers, creating three factions: the Savers, who continued to support him; the Hunters, who tried to kill him and the Blade Children; and the Watchers, who believed that the Blade Children should be kept under observation until it emerged that they would be dangerous. The Hunters tried multiple times to kill Yaiba, who managed to survive every assassination attempt, from bullets to bombs. Eventually, when Yaiba was thirty-six years old, Kiyotaka Narumi emerged from seemingly nowhere and easily killed him. With Yaiba's death, the Blade Children Project was halted; Kiyotaka took control of Yaiba's operations, trying to stop the Hunters from killing all the Blade Children and keeping the Savers in check at the same time.
Keishisei Kanzaka (神坂 警視正, Kanzaka Keishisei)
A hunter on the police force only seen in the anime. He is constantly ragging on Madoka by telling her to quit or putting her on smaller cases, causing her to gripe about it to Wataya at the local bar. Kanzaka also abducted Rio and Hiyono, holding them hostage in an abandoned hotel in order to lure Kousuke, Ryoko, and Ayumu into a trap. He set up a complex trap with Kanone Hilbert involving the sewer systems. Kanzaka also encourages Ayumu to leave the Blade Children alone and says "I'd hate for you to make a choice that would sadden your sister in-law" signifying that he will kill Ayumu if necessary.
He is considerably ruthless, not caring if his own men are killed in the process. When Ayumu and the others escape a building that mercenaries hired by Kanzaka are still inside, Kanzaka demolishes the building as a last resort to kill the Blade Children, presumably killing his own henchmen as he escapes.
Despite his old age, he is very resourceful and can turn the tides in his favour in a flash. In "The Confession", while outnumbered by the Blade Children, he manages to stop them by pulling out a gun and taking Ryoko hostage. He dies after letting go of Kousuke's hand and falling into an open water tank in the episode "The Confession".

== Spiral: Alive characters ==
Several of the main characters in Spiral: Alive are new characters. Several characters from the original series appear in Spiral: Alive and play key supporting roles, including Kosuke, Ryoko, Rio, Kiyotaka, and Kirie.

Imari Sekiguchi (関口伊万里, Sekiguchi Imari)
An eccentric girl who speaks and acts without thinking and falls in love with Shirou Sawamura. She intended to confess her love to him, but kept delaying because of trivial details, like how her hair was not perfect. On the day she finally intends to confess (finally without any inhibitions), Shirou has mysteriously dropped out of school to become a great detective and pursue Kiyotaka Narumi. In her pursuit of Shirou, Imari becomes involved with Yukine Amanae, Kiyotaka Narumi, and the Blade Children.
Imari is frequently described as moronic, especially because she has a fiery temper and tends to think up over-the-top somewhat unrealistic scenarios. She has two friends, Akane (茜) and Moegi (萌黄), who serve as explanatory foils, mostly because they tend to be level-headed and practical. After Yukine reveals herself as a serial killer, Imari is interrogated by the police and asserts a strange belief that Yukine was not involved with the murders. As a result, Kiyotaka expresses a belief that she could be the one who understands the Blade Children and Yukine Amanae. Imari is currently in contact with Kousuke, who is reluctantly working for Kiyotaka to investigate Yukine Amanae.
Shirou Sawamura (沢村史郎, Sawamura Shirō)
A calm and intelligent boy who lives alone. Like Imari, Shirou is seen as somewhat odd. He intends to become a detective like Kiyotaka and apparently does not worry about the consequences of pursuing this path. His obsession with Yukine Amanae and Kiyotaka stems from an incident where he was kidnapped by murderer with long black hair (like Yukine). Helpless and unable to act, Shirou watched as Kiyotaka arrived and save him by telling the murderer that she could die and the woman committed suicide. Shirou's desire to reach Kiyotaka is to see if Kiyotaka's decision was right, but he feels the only way to achieve this is to reach the detective's level.
After dropping out of school, he dates Yukine Amanae after she reveals a mutual interest in Kiyotaka. When Yukine's role as a serial killer is discovered, he turns her into the police. However, he continues to investigate Yukine with Ryoko in hopes of saving Yukine.
Yukine Amanae (雨苗雪音, Amanae Yukine)
An intelligent and beautiful girl who becomes a serial killer who leaves handmade music boxes after each murder. Yukine's motives are largely unknown, but she is apparently targeting Kiyotaka and the Blade Children for revenge. She is the sole holder of the Mikanagi File, with its information contained entirely in her memory - no concrete records of the file exist.
Her father, Fusai Amanae (雨苗夫妻, Amanae Fusai), was a surgeon and her mother was a psychiatrist. Her father, as an associate of Professor Isabel Mikanagi, was entrusted with information concerning thirteen Blade Children erased from the list of eighty Blade Children held by Kiyotaka, the Watchers, the Savers, and the Hunters. After Mikanagi's death, the Amanae family fled to Japan with one of the Blade Children, a girl named Charlotte. When Charlotte's blood awoke murderously, Yukine's parents and Charlotte were killed in a resulting house fire, leaving Yukine the only survivor. When Yukine turned seventeen, she inherited her parents' bequest - the Mikanagi File.
Toru Saiki (斉木 享, Saiki Tōru)
A member of the Police Department's First Investigations Department who investigates the mysterious murders connected with Amanae. During his investigation, he expresses an obvious dislike of Kiyotaka and the admiration most of the police department has in Kiyotaka, believing that Kiyotaka's abilities are more demonic than divine. Saiki is an acquaintance of both Kirie and Madoka, who he has apparently known since before she married Kiyotaka considering that he still refers to her by her maiden name out of habit. When Amanae is apprehended as a serial killer, Saiki maintains suspicion that the events involving Amanae have not fully concluded.
Professor Sheffield (シェフィールド博士, Shefirudo-hakase)
An associate of Professor Isabel Mikanagi and one of the more dangerous Hunters. He possesses extensive knowledge of chemicals and is able to create potent truth serums, offering one to Kiyotaka to use to interrogate Yukine Amanae for the location of the Mikanagi File. Professor Sheffield offers to cooperate with Kiyotaka to recover the Mikanagi File, but expresses a willingness to use less moral methods if necessary. To inhibit Professor Sheffield, Kiyotaka assigns Kanone Hilbert to attack Sheffield's lab. When Sheffield and Kiyotaka meet several days later, Kiyotaka reveals that Sheffield was responsible for pressing the "switch" that caused Charlotte to awaken murderously.
Charlotte (シャ－ロット, Shaarotto)
A Blade Child adopted by the Amanae family when they fled to Japan with the Mikanagi File. Yukine reveals that she and Charlotte lived like real sisters and recalls how protective she felt of Charlotte. When Charlotte was six years old, her blood was awakened murderously and she stabbed Yukine. Yukine's parents tried to stop Charlotte to protect the girls and a fire mysteriously started. Yukine managed to escape the burning house, but her parents and Charlotte perished in the fire. When their bodies were found, the bodies of Amanaes were found to be shielding Charlotte.
Professor Isabel Mikanagi (イザベル御巫, Izaberu Mikanagi)
When the Blade Children Project failed, Yaiba's followers divided into three factions: the Hunters, the Watchers, and the Savers. Because she felt that she could not trust any of the three factions with the safety of the Blade Children, Professor Isabel Mikanagi ensured that thirteen children would be able to flee and prevented any of the three factions from locating them. She deleted the personal information of thirteen Blade Children from the database, changed the children's names, and those of their guardians, and committed suicide. However, she was aware of the potential danger that the children may cause in the future and entrusted the information she had erased to one of her associates, Fusai Amanae. The Amanaes, to protect the information should anything happen them, had their daughter memorize the information when she was eight years old. As a result, Yukine holds in her memory the only information regarding the thirteen missing Blade Children; all her serial murders were actually Blade Children who were not listed in the three factions' database.
