= Eita Mizuno =

Japanese manga artist and illustrator

Eita Mizuno (水野 英多, Mizuno Eita) (born 17 January) is a Japanese manga artist and illustrator, best known for illustrating the Spiral: The Bonds of Reasoning series.

== Works ==
=== Manga ===
- Spiral: The Bonds of Reasoning (story by Kyō Shirodaira)
- Spiral: Alive (story by Kyō Shirodaira)
- Umineko no Naku Koro Ni: Episode 07 - Requiem of the Golden Witch (story by Ryukishi07)
- Otherside Picnic (story by Iori Miyazawa)

=== Art books ===
- Eita Mizuno Art Book: Spiral
- Eita Mizuno Art Book 2: Spiral All Along
- Eita Mizuno Art Book 3: Spiral Alive
