= Karin Takahashi (voice actress) =

Japanese voice actress

- 高橋 花林
- Born: September 9, 1994 (age 32); Kanagawa Prefecture, Japan
- Education: Rikkyo University
- Occupations: Voice actress; singer
- Years active: 2013–present
- Agent: Aoni Production
- Notable work: The Idolmaster Cinderella Girls as Nono Morikubo; Ongaku Shōjo as Sasame Mitsukuri; Between the Sky and Sea as Haru Soramachi; Dr. Stone as Suika; Chainsaw Man as Kobeni Higashiyama; Assault Lily as Miriam Hildegard von Gropius
- Height: 154 cm (5 ft 1 in)

Karin Takahashi (高橋 花林, Takahashi Karin; born September 9, 1994) is a Japanese voice actress and singer who is affiliated with Aoni Production. After winning an audition in 2012, she began her entertainment activities in 2013 with the release of the song "Kimi to Futari" which she sang with Yurika Endō. That same year, she played her first role as Yui Natsukawa in the anime television series Ace of Diamond. She is also known for her roles as Nono Morikubo in The Idolmaster Cinderella Girls, Sasame Mitsukuri in Ongaku Shōjo, and Haru Soramachi in Between the Sky and Sea. From 2013 to 2016, she was a member of the music group Trefle.

== Biography ==
Takahashi was born in Kanagawa Prefecture on September 9, 1994. She had been interested in songs used in anime since the age of four, when under the influence of her grandfather, she would listen to music from Inuyasha and Cardcaptor Sakura. While in elementary school, she wanted to become a lawyer as she had become fond of watching crime drama series on television, but later on decided to pursue an entertainment-related career instead. When she was 17, she participated in a voice acting audition held by the media company Pony Canyon; she would become the audition's winner, beating numerous other participants.

Takahashi's first activity as an entertainer was the release of the song "Kimi to Futari" (君と二人), which she performed together with fellow newcomer Yurika Endō as the duo Yuri*Kari; the song was used as the ending theme to the 2013 anime television series The Severing Crime Edge. That same year, she made her voice acting debut as the character Yui Natsukawa in the anime series Ace of Diamond.

In 2017, Takahashi announced that she had graduated from Rikkyo University. That same year, she was cast as Nono Morikubo in The Idolmaster Cinderella Girls. She was also cast as the character Haru Soramachi in the mobile game Between the Sky and Sea, where she, Honoka Inoue, and Momoko Suzuki would perform the game's theme song "Sora to Umi no Aida" (ソラとウミのアイダ). In 2018, she was cast as Sasame Mitsukuri in Ongaku Shōjo, and she would reprise the role of Haru for the anime television series adaptation of Between the Sky and Sea.

In 2022, Takahashi tested positive for COVID-19.

== Filmography ==
=== Anime ===
2013

- Ace of Diamond as Yui Natsukawa

2015

- My Love Story!! as Female student
- Lance 'N Masques (episode 6)

2017

- The Idolmaster Cinderella Girls Theater as Nono Morikubo

2018

- SSSS.Gridman as Anosillus the 2nd
- Ongaku Shōjo as Sasame Mitsukuri
- Between the Sky and Sea as Haru Soramachi

2019

- Dr. Stone as Suika
- SSSS.Dynazenon as The 2nd

2020

- Assault Lily Bouquet as Miriam Hildegard von Gropius

2021

- Gunma-chan as Gunma-chan
- Assault Lily Fruits as Miriam Hildegard von Gropius

2022

- Do It Yourself!! as Shii
- Chainsaw Man as Kobeni Higashiyama

2025

- Me and the Alien MuMu as Siberia

=== Anime films ===
- Gridman Universe (2023) as The 2nd
- Chainsaw Man – The Movie: Reze Arc (2025) as Kobeni Higashiyama

=== Video games ===
- Dengeki Bunko Fighting Climax (2014) as Zero
- Between the Sky and Sea (2017) as Haru Soramachi
- Fate/Grand Order (2020) as Van Gogh
- Xenoblade Chronicles: Definitive Edition (2020) as Teelan
- Granblue Fantasy (2021) as Lich
- Umamusume: Pretty Derby (2021) as Kawakami Princess
- Super Robot Wars 30 (2021) as Lian Ambird
- Assault Lily: Last Bullet (2021) Miriam Hildegard von Gropius
- Alchemy Stars (2022) as Kayano
- D4DJ (2022) as Lumina Ichihoshi
- Azur Lane (2023) as The 2nd, Hatsuzuki
- WitchSpring R (2023) as Pieberry
- Zenless Zone Zero (2024) as Burnice White
- Arknights: Endfield (2026) as Estella

=== Stage ===
- Kageki Shojo!! (2024) as Chika Sawada
