= Rakudai Majo =

Japanese children's novel series

- First novel volume cover

らくだい魔女
- Genre: Fantasy
- Novel series
- Written by: Satoko Narita
- Illustrated by: Senno Enaga
- Published by: Poplar Publishing
- Imprint: Poplar Pocket Bunko
- Original run: October 2006 – present
- Volumes: 17 + 1
- Anime film

Rakudai Majo: Fūka to Yami no Majo
- Directed by: Takayuki Hamana
- Written by: Kiyoko Yoshimura
- Music by: Shun Narita; Yasuyuki Yamazaki
- Studio: Production I.G
- Released: March 31, 2023
- Runtime: 59 minutes

Rakudai Majo (らくだい魔女; "Failure Witch") is a Japanese children's novel series, written by Satoko Narita and illustrated by Senno Enaga. Poplar Publishing have published seventeen volumes and one short story volume since October 2006 under their Poplar Pocket Bunko imprint. An anime film adaptation by Production I.G titled Rakudai Majo: Fūka to Yami no Majo opened in Japan in March 2023.

== Characters ==
Fūka (フウカ)
Voiced by: Honoka Inoue
Chitose (チトセ)
Voiced by: Mutsumi Tamura
Karin (カリン)
Voiced by: Manaka Iwami
Keith (キース, Kīsu)
Voiced by: Kensho Ono
Lilica (リリカ, Ririka)
Voiced by: Ayane Sakura
Megaira (メガイラ)
Voiced by: Yoko Hikasa
Reia (レイア)
Voiced by: Rie Tanaka
Abel (アベル, Aberu)
Voiced by: Jun Fukuyama
Glaudy (グラウディ, Guraudi)
Voiced by: Ken Uo
Lloyd (ロイド, Roido)
Voiced by: Katsuyuki Konishi
Karen (カレン)
Voiced by: Yumiri Hanamori
Patty (パティ, Pati)
Voiced by: Aya Endō
Cecil (セシル, Seshiru)
Voiced by: Saho Shirasu
Kai (カイ)
Voiced by: Nobuhiko Okamoto

== Media ==
=== Novels ===
No.	Release date	ISBN
1	October 2006	978-4-591-09464-8
2	January 2007	978-4-591-09574-4
3	May 2007	978-4-591-09778-6
4	September 2007	978-4-591-09904-9
5	January 2008	978-4-591-10054-7
6	September 2008	978-4-591-10339-5
7	January 2009	978-4-591-10752-2
8	May 2009	978-4-591-10956-4
9	September 2009	978-4-591-11143-7
10	December 2009	978-4-591-11492-6
11	April 2010	978-4-591-11737-8
12	August 2010	978-4-591-11989-1
13	December 2010	978-4-591-12207-5
14	April 2011	978-4-591-12412-3
15	October 2011	978-4-591-12612-7
16	October 2012	978-4-591-12902-9
SS	March 2013	978-4-591-13380-4
17	October 2013	978-4-591-13610-2

=== Anime film ===
An anime film adaptation was announced on October 10, 2021. The film, titled Rakudai Majo: Fūka to Yami no Majo, is animated by Production I.G and directed by Takayuki Hamana, with Kiyoko Yoshimura overseeing the scripts, Marumi Sugita handling the character designs, and Shun Narita and Yasuyuki Yamazaki composing the music. It opened in Japan on March 31, 2023. The theme song is "Tokimeki no Kaze ni Notte" (ときめきの風に乗って; "Ride the Heartthrobbing Wind") by Honoka Inoue.

== Reception ==
The novel series has a cumulative 1.6 million copies in print.
