= Uglymug, Epicfighter =

Japanese web novel series

- Light novel volume cover

ブサメンガチファイター (Busamen Gachi Faitā)
- Genre: Isekai
- Novel series
- Written by: Ryō Hiromatsu
- Published by: Shōsetsuka ni Narō
- Original run: February 19, 2015 – October 15, 2022
- Manga
- Written by: Ryō Hiromatsu
- Illustrated by: Osamu Kozuki
- Published by: Square Enix
- English publisher: NA: Square Enix
- Imprint: Big Gangan Comics
- Magazine: Monthly Big Gangan
- Original run: November 25, 2017 – December 25, 2020
- Volumes: 6
- Light novel
- Written by: Ryō Hiromatsu
- Illustrated by: Akira Banpai
- Published by: Kobunsha
- Imprint: Kobunsha Light Books
- Published: May 18, 2018
- Manga

Busamen Gachi Fighter SSS
- Written by: Ryō Hiromatsu
- Illustrated by: Osamu Kozuki
- Published by: Square Enix
- English publisher: NA: Square Enix
- Imprint: Big Gangan Comics
- Magazine: Monthly Big Gangan
- Original run: December 25, 2024 – September 25, 2025
- Volumes: 2
- Anime television series
- Directed by: Toshiyuki Sone
- Written by: Kenta Ihara
- Music by: Ryo Kawasaki
- Studio: White Fox
- Licensed by: Crunchyroll; SEA: Medialink
- Original network: Tokyo MX, Sun TV, BS Fuji, AT-X
- Original run: July 6, 2025 – September 21, 2025
- Episodes: 12
- icon

Uglymug, Epicfighter (ブサメンガチファイター, Busamen Gachi Faitā) is a Japanese web novel series written by Ryō Hiromatsu. It was serialized online from February 2015 to October 2022 on the user-generated novel publishing website Shōsetsuka ni Narō. A manga adaptation with art by Osamu Kozuki was serialized in Square Enix's seinen manga magazine Monthly Big Gangan from November 2017 to December 2020 and was collected in six tankōbon volumes, with a sequel manga serialized from 2024 to 2025 and collected into two volumes. A light novel version with illustrations by Akira Banpai was published under Kobunsha's Kobunsha Light Books imprint in May 2018. An anime television series adaptation produced by White Fox aired from July to September 2025.

== Plot ==
Shigeru Yoshioka, a 34-year-old former salesman, has his life collapses after he is falsely accused of a crime. Losing his job, reputation, and trust in others, Shigeru withdraws from society and lives as a shut-in. His life changes when he discovers a way to travel to another world while using his computer. A mysterious status screen pops up and offers him a choice: sacrifice his looks in exchange for immense power. Accepting the deal, Shigeru is reborn in a fantasy world with ugly looks, but absurdly high parameters, effectively making him an "absolute god" in terms of combat ability.

In his new life, Shigeru sets out as an adventurer and briefly joins a party that includes Seika, Seiji, and Leeds. Despite his overwhelming strength, his existence is shaped by weaknesses tied to his appearance, including intense pain whenever he touches a woman. As he navigates quests, battles, and relationships, Shigeru must decide whether companionship is worth the risks imposed by the circumstances of his power.

== Characters ==
Shigeru Yoshioka (吉岡 しげる, Yoshioka Shigeru)
Voiced by: Junichi Suwabe
The main protagonist, an ugly man who sacrificed his looks to gain superhuman strength and skills as the party's fighter. He was a salesman who ended up being framed for molesting a woman that led him to losing his job that led him to become fearful of women. In order to gain more bonus points, he gave himself multiple weaknesses, including the effect of taking damage when touched by women.
Seika (聖華)
Voiced by: Konomi Inagaki
The mage of the party. She is originally a 17-year-old girl who is pretty despite having a low stat for looks. Before she was sent to the other world, she was very sickly and couldn't even walk. Because of this, she enjoys the new world, but is somewhat naive.
Seiji (誠司)
Voiced by: Kento Shiraishi
The hero of the party. He is a handsome man who can transform into Aldean that makes him invincible. He was the CEO of a company Shigeru used to work with before it collapsed due to an AI accident.
Reeze (リーズ, Rīzu)
Voiced by: Maaya Uchida
The hunter of the party. Her real name is never revealed and goes by the name Reeze that was given by Seika. She is Seiji's younger sister and has the power to read the Special Notes from other adventurers.

== Media ==
=== Web novel ===
Written by Ryō Hiromatsu, Uglymug, Epicfighter was serialized as a web novel on the Shōsetsuka ni Narō website from February 19, 2015, to October 15, 2022.

=== Manga ===
A manga adaptation illustrated by Osamu Kozuki was serialized in Square Enix's seinen manga magazine Monthly Big Gangan from November 25, 2017, to December 25, 2020. The manga's chapters were collected into six tankōbon volumes released from April 25, 2018, to February 25, 2021. The manga is published in English on Square Enix's Manga Up! Global app.

A sequel manga also illustrated by Kozuki, titled Busamen Gachi Fighter SSS, was serialized from December 25, 2024, to September 25, 2025. The sequel's chapters were collected into two tankōbon volumes released on June 25 and October 24, 2025. The sequel is also published in English on Square Enix's Manga Up! Global app.

==== Uglymug, Epicfighter ====
No.	Release date	ISBN
1	April 25, 2018	978-4-7575-5703-1
2	October 25, 2018	978-4-7575-5898-4
3	April 25, 2019	978-4-7575-6106-9
4	October 25, 2019	978-4-7575-6361-2
5	June 25, 2020	978-4-7575-6715-3
6	February 25, 2021	978-4-7575-7116-7

==== Busamen Gachi Fighter SSS ====
No.	Release date	ISBN
1	June 25, 2025	978-4-7575-9918-5
2	October 24, 2025	978-4-301-00133-1

=== Light novel ===
A light novel version with illustrations by Akira Banpai was released under Kobunsha's then-newly launched Kobunsha Light Books imprint on May 18, 2018.

No.	Release date	ISBN
1	May 18, 2018	978-4-334-91219-2

=== Anime ===
An anime television series adaptation was announced on November 18, 2024. The series is produced by Egg Firm, animated by White Fox and directed by Toshiyuki Sone, with Kenta Ihara handling series composition, Miki Matsumoto designing the characters, and Ryo Kawasaki composing the music. was aired from July 6 to September 21, 2025, on Tokyo MX and other networks. The opening theme song is "My Way" performed by TEMPEST, while the ending theme song is "Bansōkō" (Bandage) performed by Miyu Kaneko. Crunchyroll will stream the series. Medialink licensed the series in Southeast Asia for streaming on Ani-One Asia's YouTube channel.

No.	Title	Directed by (Note: Production staff information is taken from the ending credits of each episode.)	Written by	Storyboarded by	Original release date
1	"An Epic God is Born"; Transliteration: "Bakutan Gachi Goddo" (Japanese: 爆誕ガチゴッド)	Toshiyuki Sone	Kenta Ihara	Kazuaki Mouri	July 6, 2025
After being falsely accused of molestation by a teenager named Kyoko the ugly man Shigeru becomes a Hikikomori. One day he performs an internet spell to send him to another world and is amazed when he is allowed to customise his next life. In exchange for making himself ugly, penniless and allergic to women he accumulates trillions of health, magic and skill points. He then awakens in another world as an ugly, obese 16 year old. With him are three others who performed the same spell; the handsome Seiji, his sister a nameless Loli-Girl, and a tsundere named Seika. Finding useful items they share them, but due to his Penniless status a coin Shigeru touches vanishes. Certain they think he is a thief Shigeru only accepts clothes and a wooden staff. Shigeru is not surprised Seika immediately dislikes him and he decides to separate from the group. They are attacked by goblins and Shigeru protects Seika, who chose a bow despite having no archery experience. A goblin injures him so he quickly puts 1 trillion points into each skill and instantly gains the title Almighty God. After reaching Iria town he tries to slip away but Seika gives him a hamburger for helping with her archery. Unfortunately, he accidentally touches her hand and his Female Allergy costs him 10% of everything (58trillion points). Seika is upset but recovers when he apologises, so he decides to stay temporarily.
2	"Exploring Epic Dungeon"; Transliteration: "Tansaku Gachi Danjon" (Japanese: 探索ガチダンジョン)	Hiroto Katou	Kenta Ihara	Hiroto Katou	July 13, 2025
Shigeru notices Seika's attitude towards him has changed. As Penniless takes away 99.99% of his money Shigeru instead trades items he makes with his skills. Seiji decides to earn money exploring a cave. Another adventurer named Kyoshiro offers to guide them, claiming he also came from Japan. Shigeru decides if Kyoshiro is untrustworthy he can just beat him up. Kyoshiro reveals he reincarnated with another man who went on to become a king. They reach the bottom floor where Kyoshiro offers them a celebratory snack. Shigeru detects sleeping poison in the drinks and confirms Kyoshiro is a bandit who enslaves people newly reincarnated from Japan. Not wanting to draw attention to his power Shigeru lets the others drink so they fall asleep. Seiji reveals he was a company president and remembers meeting an ugly salesman who gave him good advice. Years later he went bankrupt but still regrets he never managed to thank the ugly salesman. Shigeru hides that he was the salesman. Kyoshiro's bandits arrive and unable to use his power with Seiji watching Shigeru resorts to throwing his obese body around as a weapon, causing chaos. Seiji reveals when he was customising his new life he designed an ultimate skill activated by righteous anger. Shigeru is surprised when Seiji transforms into the winged warrior Aldean.
3	"Hero's Epic Burning"; Transliteration: "Yūsha Gachi Bāningu" (Japanese: 勇者ガチバーニング)	Chika Nenbe	Kenta Ihara	Shinji Itadaki	July 20, 2025
Aldean naively decides to arrest the bandits, almost getting himself stabbed in the back, but Shigeru causes a huge explosion. Aldean turns back into Seiji, who falls asleep, allowing Shigeru to properly capture the bandits. The bounty is R100,000, of which Seiji insists R30,000 is Shigeru's. Since Penniless would only let him keep R3 Shigeru gives it to Seika. From their conversation Shigeru concludes Seika must have been rich but incredibly sheltered. Seika reveals when designing her new life she set her attractiveness to -16 to get bonus points then sneakily gave herself a passive ability that keeps her beautiful. Shigeru is shocked he didn't think of that himself. Shigeru further deduces Seika's clumsiness comes from being in a wheelchair. Seiji decides everyone should choose a career path to assign skill points. Seiji chooses Hero, Seika a Mage, Loli-Girl a Hunter and Shigeru an Epic Fighter. Shigeru convinces Seika a skipping rope is a martial art weapon, hoping it will improve her ability to walk. Seika tries to be friends with Loli-Girl and asks permission to call her Reeze. Loli-Girl is surprised and doesn't answer, upsetting Seika. Loli-Girl later sends Seika a note accepting the nickname. Reeze speaks to Shigeru alone and reveals she knows he was the ugly salesman who gave Seiji good business advice.
4	"One-Arm Epic Danger"; Transliteration: "Kataude Gachi Denjā" (Japanese: 片腕ガチデンジャー)	Daisuke Eguchi	Kenta Ihara	Hitomi Ezoe	July 27, 2025
Reeze reveals in exchange for making herself unable to lie she gave herself the ability to read other people's status screens, so she knows who Seika and Shigeru were in the past. She admits in her old life she wrote an AI programme that bankrupted Seiji's company when it caused a major accident in which Seika was hurt. So far, Seiji is unaware Reeze is his sister. Due to her guilt she intends to help Shigeru improve life for Seiji and Seika. The group set off for Valleria City to find work. An injured woman named Reia stumbles into their camp missing an arm. In her sleep it is revealed she also came from Japan and due to being cheated on by her boyfriend she hates women. Reeze worries as Reia's status screen shows she gave herself a passive ability that compels her to murder attractive girls. Reia claims her party was attacked by bandits, though Shigeru doubts this. Reia asks Seika to help her bathe in the river. Shigeru is so worried he puts Seiji to sleep with a spell and follows them. Reia admits her passive ability has forced her to murder many women and now she intends to murder Seika. Shigeru intervenes, deciding to end Reia's suffering by killing her. Suddenly, Seika glows with a white light and gains angel wings.
5	"Epic Angel Descends"; Transliteration: "Kōrin Gachi Engeru" (Japanese: 降臨ガチエンジェル)	Yasuaki Fujiwara	Kenta Ihara	Kenichi Kawamura	August 3, 2025
Seika reveals when designing her second life she gave herself the power to fix what is broken. She restores Reia's missing arm but cannot fix her status screen. Reia convinces herself Seika has an ugly face when she is crying, allowing Reia to run away without killing. Shigeru prevents her blinding herself so she can't see attractive women. Instead he offers to curse her eyesight, which still blinds her but doesn't require hurting herself. Reia accepts but chooses to start a new life on her own. Shigeru advises Seika not to use her power again as it makes her a target for evil people. Shigeru agrees to always protect her and Seika insists on shaking hands. Not wanting to ruin the moment Shigeru shakes her hand, enduring the pain of his Female Allergy. Shigeru surprises Reeze by asking her to write down exactly what it says on Seiji's status screen, revealing he thinks Seiji has the potential to become king so he needs to know if Aldean has any weakness Shigeru needs to protect him from. They encounter monsters and Seiji tries to become Aldean but fails as he can't make himself righteously angry for no reason. Eventually he manages to transform and defeat the monsters before turning back. Seika doesn't realise Aldean is Seiji and starts hero worshipping him, making it awkward. Shigeru struggles to remember why he wanted Seiji to become king.
6	"Epic Undercover Mission"; Transliteration: "Sen'nyū Gachi Misshon" (Japanese: 潜入ガチミッション)	Daisuke Eguchi	Kenta Ihara	Daisuke Eguchi	August 10, 2025
The group arrives in Valleria, which Shigeru is disappointed has an unemployment centre. Shigeru laments it will be almost impossible for the others to earn a living adventuring so they will need to find normal jobs. Seiji decides to visit a casino to gather information. Seika gambles away R20,000 so casino manager Kajita approaches, believing Seika is rich. He offers her membership to the casino's Extra Stage for the extremely wealthy but Shigeru warns her to ask Seiji first. Reeze reveals Kajita's status screen shows he is immune to lies, hates rich people and delights in bankrupting them. Seiji notices the casino routinely posts high paying job offers at the unemployment centre, yet never hires anyone. The one exception was a man who was hired to identify potential rich people, except that man has now gone missing. Reeze also reveals a man leaving from the back of the casino accidentally dropped a human finger. Seika decides to accept the Extra Stage membership so she can investigate undercover. Reeze warns Shigeru Kajita might even be dangerous to him as his status screen shows if he is lied to he becomes able to use additional skills, plus his status screen is unnatural, like multiple screens smashed together at random. Seika goes undercover after learning from Shigeru how to avoid telling lies without actually telling the truth.
7	"Villainous Epic Master"; Transliteration: "Gokuaku Gachi Masutā" (Japanese: 極悪ガチマスター)	Chika Nenbe	Kenta Ihara	Hinako Shouki	August 17, 2025
Kajita takes Seika and Shigeru to the Extra Stage and assigns them a dealer, a nervous man named Kato. Shigeru eavesdrops on Kajita and learns Kajita's parents were poor but raised him to enjoy life, until greedy real estate developers murdered his parents for their store. Kajita murdered the developers and was going to commit suicide but was suddenly offered a new life. Shigeru watches Kajita catch one of his men lying, activating a skill that drains his skills and energy to death. Shigeru discovers Penniless doesn't activate when Seika wins casino tokens. Kajita invites them to wager on artificial monsters fighting in his Collosseum. Kato breaks down and tells them all Kajita's crimes. Aldean arrives to defeat Kajita, so Seika transforms into her own angel form but hides her identity by claiming she is El Carone the Sun Maiden. Reeze joins in with a pair of demon wings and becomes simply Demon Girl. Shigeru is baffled why all three are hiding secret identities from each other. Shigeru insists Kato come with them as a witness, as it is obvious the casino could only have survived with the protection of someone in Valleria's government. Realising Seika and Aldean are too innocent to handle real evil; Shigeru insists he will handle Kajita while they fight his men.
8	"Epic Collosseum Showdown"; Transliteration: "Kessen Gachi Koroshiamu" (Japanese: 決戦ガチコロシアム)	Hiroyuki Tsuchiya	Kenta Ihara	Naoto Hosoda	August 24, 2025
Shigeru retrieves a rich man from the Collosseum. Shigeru finds Kajita who insists kindness is learned by experiencing poverty, so he will force the rich to learn by taking everything from them. Shigeru points out he is acting like a rich person, using power instead of money. Kajita summons a level 9999 monster which Shigeru defeats, explaining how he tricked Kajita without lying; his job title is Epic Fighter, but his identity is Almighty God. Kajita is stabbed from behind by a second Almighty God, a woman, angry Kajita killed one of her men. Shigeru remains wary since as a woman she could defeat him by activating his Female Allergy. She reveals she belongs to Ordnung Spear, an alliance of reincarnated people like herself and Kajita who gave themselves unusual skills and can't fit into normal society. She invites Shigeru to join Ordnung Spear. Suspicious, Shigeru refuses until after he has guided his friends to a better life. The woman is enraged; having hoped Shigeru could have guided her instead, as she was tired of being the world's only supreme being. As she had lied to him Kajita tries to steal Almighty God from her, but she completely obliterates him. She departs, revealing she is Karina and promising to prevent Shigeru achieving any of his goals.
9	"Starting an Epic Company"; Transliteration: "Setsuritsu Gachi Kanpanī" (Japanese: 設立ガチカンパニー)	Daisuke Eguchi	Kenta Ihara	Kei Oikawa	August 31, 2025
The group are granted an R400,000 cash reward along with the R2million Seika won at gambling. Shigeru tells them about Ordnung, which Karina claimed rules the criminal underworld. Kato informs them the rich man Shigeru rescued is a weapons dealer who needs guards on his trip home. Shigeru is depressed to learn the man is Sakurai, his boss from Japan, infamous for sexual harassment and drinking. Luckily, he is unaware Shigeru is his former employee. Karina watches them leave. Sakurai's factory manager Suzuki does not recognise Ordnung's flag but does remember a man wearing a similar cloak purchasing 1000 spears. Seiji tells Shigeru he is thinking of owning his own business, planning to hire the troublesome reincarnations before they join Ordnung. Shigeru doubts this would work as the reincarnations unique abilities pose too many problems. Seiji persists and asks Shigeru to be a board member. Shigeru reveals his Penniless might affect company profits but Seiji accepts the risk. Seika and Reeze also agree to join and one month later open the company Vis Bridge. Seiji as Chairman, the others as board members, Kai Yoshio as President, the man Seiji hired to help infiltrate the casino, and Kato as an Assistant. Soon they have a steady supply of reincarnated employees. A beautiful woman applies for a job and Shigeru gets a very bad feeling about her.
10	"Bewitching Epic Lady"; Transliteration: "Yōen Gachi Redi" (Japanese: 妖艶ガチレディ)	Hitomi Ezoe	Kenta Ihara	Shinji Itadaki	September 7, 2025
The woman, Leah, reveals she was a fake psychic who started learning to manipulate people from an ugly salesman. Shigeru realises she must have been one of his junior co-workers. Shigeru and Reeze later witness Leah meet a loan shark named Kaido who wears an Ordnung flag. Leah buys a girl he was going to sell into slavery and sends her home safely but cries over a boy who died before she could buy him. Shigeru decides Leah isn't evil. Karina disguises herself as a human and becomes friends with Seika. Karina informs Shigeru Almighty Gods are created when a human reincarnates and exchanges one of the three primal desires for power. Shigeru sacrificed sexual desire, but Karina is twice as strong because she sacrificed sexual desire and sleep. She also gave herself a weakness; if she ever kisses a person she loves she dies. She then threatens to bring despair to the naïve Seika. The next day Leah admits when her ugly co-worker was falsely accused she hunted down Kyoko, the woman responsible, and stabbed her. Then when given a chance to reincarnate she impulsively made her status screen a bewitching villain who seduces fools with an elegant face until a God disguised as a prince on a horse comes to rescue her. Shigeru decides to hire her, convinced she has a good heart. The brother of the girl Leah bought rushes in crying that someone kidnapped his sister.
11	"Epic God in Despair"; Transliteration: "Zetsubō Gachi Goddo" (Japanese: 絶望ガチゴッド)	Yasuaki Fujiwara	Kenta Ihara	Hiromitsu Kanazawa	September 14, 2025
Reeze reveals Karina was Reiko, the twin sister of Kyoko. Kaido decides to betray Karina for not paying him, so he shouts that he does not believe in Gods, removing Karina's power as she only has power when people believe. Shigeru arrives but also loses his God powers, including his ugliness, transforming him into a handsome man whom Leah mistakes as her prince. Unable to explain to his friends Shigeru claims he is Sieg Schneider and joins Aldean and Demon Girl fighting Kaido. Karina partially transforms herself to remove her Almighty God status, circumventing Kaido's lack of belief and restoring most of her power. She defeats Kaido easily. Shigeru accuses her of wanting revenge on Leah for hurting Kyoko, but Karina admits she actually hates Leah because she didn't kill Kyoko, revealing Kyoko was born a violent monster that Karina wished would die. When Kyoko survived Leah's attack Karina reincarnated to escape her but grew tired of being God, so when she met Shigeru she hoped he would become her God instead, yet he only cared about Seika. Seika transforms into El Carone to protect Leah. Karina defeats Aldean and Demon Girl and moves to attack Leah.
12	"Uglymug, Epicfighter"; Transliteration: "Busamen Gachi Faitā" (Japanese: ブサメンガチファイター)	Toshiyuki Sone	Kenta Ihara	Kazuaki Mouri	September 21, 2025
Karina insists she is entitled to get revenge for the abuse she suffered. Believing they might die Reeze admits to Seiji she is his sister. Seika recalls after her accident children would bully her for her appearance, until Shigeru rescued her and told her she has a heart as warm as the sun. Shigeru suddenly remembers meeting her in Japan. With Seika's belief in him Shigeru regains his obese body and throws himself and Karina into an empty abyss to fight her at full strength. He urges her to stop living as Kyoka's victim when they don't even inhabit the same world anymore. Karina fights even harder than before so he summons an entire moon to crush her. Karina uses a forbidden skill that annihilates everything within 200km. Shigeru, having manipulated her into using that exact spell, strikes her during the spell's 2 second activation delay, obliterating her in a massive explosion. Shigeru returns to his friends and claims Sieg must have defeated Karina. Kaido is imprisoned. Vis Bridge becomes successful. Karina reappears alive and promises to see Shigeru again. Shigeru decides that since they all met before the four of them reincarnating together couldn't be an accident. Sakurai delivers information on Ordnung Spear. In the excitement to get started Seika touches Shigeru's hand, costing him another 10% of his points.
