= Do It Yourself!! =

Japanese anime television series

- Promotional poster for the anime

Do It Yourself!! -どぅー・いっと・ゆあせるふ- (Dū Itto Yuaserufu!!)
- Genre: Slice of life
- Created by: Avex Pictures; IMAGO
- Anime television series
- Directed by: Kazuhiro Yoneda
- Written by: Kazuyuki Fudeyasu
- Music by: Ryōhei Sataka
- Studio: Pine Jam
- Licensed by: Crunchyroll
- Original network: TV Tokyo, AT-X, BS11, NST
- Original run: October 6, 2022 – December 22, 2022
- Episodes: 12
- Manga
- Written by: Koyubita Beru
- Published by: Square Enix
- English publisher: NA: Square Enix
- Magazine: Manga Up!
- Original run: October 5, 2022 – July 11, 2023
- Volumes: 3
- Television drama
- Directed by: Mamoru Yoshino
- Written by: Masatoshi Nakamura
- Original network: MBS
- Original run: July 5, 2023 – August 30, 2023
- Episodes: 8
- icon

Do It Yourself!! (Japanese: どぅー・いっと・ゆあせるふ!!, Hepburn: Dū Itto Yuaserufu!!) is an original Japanese anime television series produced by Pine Jam and directed by Kazuhiro Yoneda. The series aired from October to December 2022 on TV Tokyo and other channels. A manga adaptation by Koyubita Beru was serialized in Square Enix's online manga magazine Manga Up! from October 2022 to July 2023. A live-action television drama adaptation aired from July to August 2023.

== Plot ==
Yua Serufu and Miku "Purin" Suride are two childhood friends who both applied to the prestigious Yuyu Girls' Vocational School. However, the two are separated after only Purin is accepted, with Yua instead enrolling at the nearby Gatagata Girls' High School. After a cycling accident, she encounters Rei Yasaku, a fellow Gatagata student who offers to repair her bike. Rei then invites Yua to join the school's DIY Club, which is in danger of disbandment. Remembering her friendship with Purin and seeing DIY as her path to reuniting with her, Yua decides to join the club.

== Characters ==
Serufu Yua (結愛 せるふ, Yua Serufu)
Voiced by: Konomi Inagaki
Portrayed by: Hinano Kamimura
A laid-back freshman attending Gatagata Girls' High School who ends up joining the DIY Club. She is very accident-prone, with a perfect attendance record at the nurse's office. Because of her being prone to injury, she is often seen with bandages on her body. Her name in Japanese order is a homonym of the "yourself" in "do it yourself".
Miku Suride (須理出 未来, Suride Miku) / Purin (ぷりん)
Voiced by: Kana Ichinose
Portrayed by: Iori Noguchi
Serufu's childhood friend and neighbor who attends Yuyu Girls' Vocational High School for technology as a first-year student. She is nicknamed "Purin" by Serufu (and subsequently "Pudding" by Jobuko) due to her cheeks puffing up when she pouts, and is often not honest about her feelings, particularly when it comes to Serufu. Her surname and nickname ("Suride Purin") are a play on "3D print".
Rei Yasaku (矢差暮 礼, Yasaku Rei) / Kurei (くれい)
Voiced by: Ayane Sakura
Portrayed by: Akiho Moriyama
A third-year student at Gatagata and head of the DIY Club. She has a strong passion for DIY, although this has led to some weird rumors about her around the school. Her family runs the Waku Waku Wan Wan hardware store.
Takumi Hikage (日蔭 匠, Hikage Takumi) / Takumi (たくみ)
Voiced by: Azumi Waki
Portrayed by: Kokoro Hirasawa
A shy first-year student at Gatagata and Serufu's classmate, who also joins the DIY Club.
Kokoro Kōki (幸希 心, Kōki Kokoro) / Shii (しー)
Voiced by: Karin Takahashi
Portrayed by: Mai Kikuchi
Miku's classmate at Yuyu, who is very friendly and energetic. She grew up in Southeast Asia. Because she does not go to Gatagata, she cannot be an official member of the DIY Club and is instead an external member.
Juliet Queen Elizabeth VIII (ジュリエット・クイーン・エリザベス8世, Jurietto Kuīn Erizabesu Hassei) / Jobuko (ジョブ子, Jobuko)
Voiced by: Nichika Ōmori
Portrayed by: Shizuku Ōta
A 12-year-old child prodigy from the United States who ended up enrolling at Gatagata instead of Yuyu due to a kanji spelling error and is staying at Miku's house. As she doesn't like her full name, she adopts the nickname "Jobuko" from Serufu after she hears her say "Good job!" She uses her skills and state-of-the-art technology to assist with her DIY projects. She returns to the US at the end of the series, as her stay in Japan was intended to be temporary.
Haruko Hoketsu (法華津 治子, Hoketsu Haruko)
Voiced by: Yumi Kakazu
The school nurse at Gatagata and advisor for the DIY Club, who constantly tends to Serufu's injuries. It is revealed later in the series that she is also an alumna of the DIY Club.
Serufu's mother (せるふの母, Serufu no Haha)
Voiced by: Kikuko Inoue
Serufu's mother, who is just as laid-back as her daughter.

== Media ==
=== Anime ===
The original anime television series by Pine Jam was announced on March 25, 2021. The series is directed by Kazuhiro Yoneda, written by Kazuyuki Fudeyasu, features character designs by Yūsuke Matsuo, and music composed by Ryōhei Sataka. It aired from October 6 to December 22, 2022, on TV Tokyo, AT-X, BS11, and NST. (Note: TV Tokyo listed the series premiere at 24:00 JST on October 5, 2022, which is effectively October 6 at midnight.) The opening theme is "Dokidoki Idea o Yoroshiku!" (どきどきアイデアをよろしく！) by Konomi Inagaki, Kana Ichinose, Ayane Sakura, Azumi Waki, Karin Takahashi, and Nichika Ōmori, while the ending theme is "Tsuzuku Hanashi" (続く話) by Inagaki and Ichinose. Crunchyroll streamed the series.

No.	Title (Note: All English titles are taken from Crunchyroll.)	Directed by	Written by	Storyboarded by	Original release date
1	"What is 'DIY'?"; Transliteration: "Dī Ai Wai tte, Dō Iu Yatsu?" (Japanese: DIYって、どー・いう・やつ？)	Kazuhiro Yoneda	Kazuyuki Fudeyasu	Kazuhiro Yoneda	October 6, 2022 (Note: This episode aired at 12:30 a.m. JST, 30 minutes after the original air time on TV Tokyo.)
Serufu Yua begins attending Gatagata Girls' High School after failing to get into the elite Yuuyuu Girls' Vocational High School with her childhood friend Miku "Purin" Suride. On her way to school, Serufu crashes her bicycle but is aided by third year student Rei "Kurei" Yasaku. Wanting to give Rei her thanks, Serufu comes to a hut around the back of school, which is revealed to be the clubhouse for the DIY Club that Rei leads. After trying out some DIY for herself and learning from school nurse Haruko Hoketsu that the club is in danger of being dissolved if it doesn't get more members, Serufu decides to join.
2	"Does 'DIY' Mean Doing Stuff With Somebody?"; Transliteration: "Dī Ai Wai tte, Dareka to Issho ni Yaru tte koto?" (Japanese: DIYって、だれかと・いっしょに・やるってこと？)	Megumi Soga	Kazuyuki Fudeyasu	Shinsaku Sasaki	October 13, 2022
Serufu brings her classmate Takumi Hikage to the DIY Club. While Serufu and Rei work on a bench made out of skis, Takumi tries her hand at making a mosaic sign for the club. After both projects are finished, Takumi decides to officially join the DIY Club.
3	"Does 'DIY' Mean Why Did You Suddenly Show Up?"; Transliteration: "Dī Ai Wai tte, Dōshite Ikinari Yattekita?" (Japanese: DIYって、どうして・いきなり・やってきた？)	Yoshiko Okuda	Kazuyuki Fudeyasu	Yoshiko Okuda	October 20, 2022 (Note: This episode aired at 12:10 a.m. JST, 10 minutes after the original air time on TV Tokyo.)
A young transfer student from America shows up outside the DIY Club house. However, her opinion that technology is superior to DIY leads her to squabble with Rei. The next day, Serufu, noticing that the girl is likely feeling lonely, involves her in a DIY activity; it is revealed that she actually enjoys DIY due to it being a hobby of her late mother. Deciding to join the club, the girl introduces herself as Juliet Queen Elizabeth VIII, a name she is not fond of, prompting Serufu to give her the nickname "Jobko". She also reveals she ended up at Gatagata instead of Yuuyuu due to a kanji mistake.
4	"'DIY' Means You'll Find It Possible to Feel Comfortable Anywhere"; Transliteration: "Dī Ai Wai tte, Dokodemo Igokochi Yoku naru yo" (Japanese: DIYって、どこでも・いごこち・よくなるよ)	Yūki Yonemori	Kazuyuki Fudeyasu	Yūki Yonemori	October 27, 2022
Miku comes over to Serufu's house while Jobko is visiting, discovering that Jobko is the daughter of the CTO of a cutting-edge tech company. After hitting it off with Miku, Jobko one-sidedly decides to start living at her house the next day, convincing Miku to help her build a hammock and Miku's mother to let her stay. The next day, just as the DIY Club takes on Miku's suggestion to build a treehouse to attract members, they are approached by another Yuuyuu Girls' student, Kokoro "Shii" Kōki.
5	"'DIY' Means Finding a Place to Belong... Finally"; Transliteration: "Dī Ai Wai tte, Doko ka ni Ibasho ga Yōyaku" (Japanese: DIYって、どこかに・いばしょが・ようやく)	Eri Irei	Kazuyuki Fudeyasu	Eri Irei	November 3, 2022
While initially reluctant to let Kokoro join, Rei comes to respect her strength through an arm-wrestling match, while Haruko, who knows Kokoro from childhood, gives her permission to become an outside club member and help build the treehouse. The next day, the club begins planning out their treehouse, learning that they will need funds for tree attachment bolts. To help save on lumber costs, Kokoro manages to locate a large quantity of unused wooden pallets, which the club makes into wall-mounted shelves to test their stability.
6	"'DIY' Means Dull, Unexciting Items Come in Handy!"; Transliteration: "Dī Ai Wai tte, Dōdemo Ii mono Yaku ni tatsu!" (Japanese: DIYって、どうでも・いいもの・やくにたつ！)	Naoya Andō	Kazuyuki Fudeyasu	Naoya Andō	November 10, 2022
The DIY Club, accompanied by Miku, go to the beach to gather materials—such as driftwood and shells—for accessories they can sell to raise funds for their treehouse. After finding everything they need, the girls spend the rest of the day playing at the beach and swimming, during which Serufu asks Miku if she'd be interested in joining the DIY Club too. The next day, the girls make their accessories, suggesting selling them at Rei's family store, while Miku contemplates making something for Serufu.
7	"'DIY' Means You Can Do Things Inside If It's Hot and Muggy Out"; Transliteration: "Dī Ai Wai tte, Jimejime shitetara Iede Yareba ii ne" (Japanese: DIYって、ぢめぢめしてたら・いえで・やればいいね)	Takashi Andō	Kazuyuki Fudeyasu	Satoshi Iwataki	November 17, 2022 (Note: This episode aired at 12:40 a.m. JST, 40 minutes after the original air time on TV Tokyo.)
With the rainy season making it too hot and humid to work in the clubroom, Rei invites the others to her house at the Waku Waku Wan Wan hardware store so they can continue their work. With assistance from Rei, the girls make resin shell necklaces, coffee drippers, and tablet stands. After a few more days of work, the items are put on sale.
8	"'DIY' Means... You Can't Do It? No, I Absolutely Can!"; Transliteration: "Dī Ai Wai tte, Dekinai? Iie! Yaremasutomo!" (Japanese: DIYって、できない？・いいえ！・やれますとも！)	Katakuri; Yoshinobu Tokumoto	Kazuyuki Fudeyasu	Yoshitsugu Kimura	November 24, 2022
Wanting to cheer Serufu up after her items do not sell, Takumi proposes that she be put in charge of the design for the treehouse that encompasses everyone's ideas. Although her initial design ends up being way too imaginative to make a reality, the girls manage to pull together choice elements into something more feasible, after which Jobko takes on the task of turning it into a blueprint. That night, as Serufu strives to become more useful to the DIY Club, Jobko confides in Miku that she does not actually know anything about making blueprints and does not have time to learn how on her own, prompting Miku to help her out, asking that her involvement be kept a secret from the club. With the blueprints completed in time, Serufu invites the others to her house to show them what she has been working on.
9	"Does 'DIY' Mean a Shocking Surprise? How Unexpected! It's Really Unexpected!"; Transliteration: "Dī Ai Wai tte, Dokkiri? Igai! Yoteigai!" (Japanese: DIYって、どっきり？・いがい！・よていがい！)	Megumi Soga	Kazuyuki Fudeyasu	Megumi Soga	December 1, 2022
After several days of preparing for the DIY Club and Miku to visit her house, Serufu reveals she is building a house for her pet pig Meat to prove herself useful to the others, who decide to make things for her other pets. As Serufu starts to struggle on her own, the others remind her that they're a team, highlighting that Serufu shines when it comes to creative ideas, and help her to complete the house. The next day, just as the DIY Club are finally about to begin building their treehouse, the girls are shocked to discover all of their materials have disappeared.
10	"'DIY' Means... Rock Bottom? Impossible? With Courage and Drive, Anything is Possible!"; Transliteration: "Dī Ai Wai tte, Donzoko? Inposshiburu? Yūki to Yaruki ga Areba Nandemo Dekiru!" (Japanese: DIYって、どんぞこ？・いんぽっしぶる？・ゆうきとやるきがあればなんでもできる！)	Kento Nakagomi	Kazuyuki Fudeyasu	Shinsaku Sasaki	December 8, 2022
With the DIY Club in a funk upon learning that a scheduling error led to their materials being mistaken for industrial waste and disposed of, Miku goes to cheer Serufu up and suggest an alternative way to gather materials. The next day, Serufu and the others, who all had the same idea, put up flyers and ask around the neighborhood for any unwanted materials. They soon regain half of the materials required for the treehouse, while the rest of the materials are donated by DIY club alumni and gathered by Haruko, who reveals she was originally a DIY Club member and one of the ones responsible for building their clubhouse. As the girls finally have enough materials to build their treehouse, Serufu asks Miku to help the club build it.
11	"'DIY' Means Do It Yourself!"; Transliteration: "Dī Ai Wai tte, Dū Itto Yuaserufu!" (Japanese: DIYって、どぅー・いっと・ゆあせるふ！)	Hideyuki Satake	Kazuyuki Fudeyasu	Hideyuki Satake	December 15, 2022
With Miku officially brought on as an external member of the DIY Club, the girls finally begin work on their treehouse with help from Rei's parents. As the treehouse nears completion, the girls find they don't have enough material to finish the roof, so they take some from the club house itself.
12	"'DIY' Means Friendship, Always and Forever!"; Transliteration: "Dī Ai Wai tte, Donna Toki mo Itsu Made mo Yūjō!" (Japanese: DIYって、どんなときも・いつまでも・ゆうじょう！)	Kento Nakagomi	Kazuyuki Fudeyasu	Kazuhiro Yoneda	December 22, 2022
After the treehouse is finally completed, the girls hold a party where they give farewell gifts to Jobko, who is due to return to America, while also managing to attract two potential recruits. As summer break begins and Jobko leaves, Miku brings Serufu over to the DIY Club grounds to build a swing for the treehouse together, along with a new wind chime like the one they made as children.

=== Manga ===
A manga adaptation illustrated by Koyubita Beru was serialized in Square Enix's online manga magazine Manga Up! from October 5, 2022, to July 11, 2023. The first tankōbon volume was released on November 7, 2022.

In August 2023, Square Enix began publishing the manga in English on their Manga Up! Global service.

No.	Japanese release date	Japanese ISBN
1	November 7, 2022	978-4-75-758234-7
2	March 7, 2023	978-4-75-758438-9
3	August 7, 2023	978-4-75-758716-8

=== Live-action ===
A live-action series adaptation was announced on April 11, 2023. It was later confirmed to be a television series directed by Mamoru Yoshino, with Masatoshi Nakamura writing the series' scripts. Hinatazaka46 member Hinano Kamimura was cast as Serufu Yua and =Love member Iori Noguchi as Miku Suride. It aired from July 5 to August 30, 2023, on MBS' Dramaism programming block. The opening theme is "Kanazuchi" (カナヅチ) by Hockrockb, while the ending theme is "Attitude" by Kohana Lam.

== Reception ==
Anime Feminist gave a positive review of the first anime episode: "... Do It Yourself!! has goofy girls, a charming visual style, and a chill vibe—all ingredients for a tasty slice-of-life experience."
