= Konomi Inagaki =

Japanese voice actress

- 稲垣 好
- Born: 24 July; Niigata Prefecture, Japan
- Occupation: Voice actress
- Years active: 2019–present
- Agent: I'm Enterprise
- Known for: Black Summoner as Ange; Do It Yourself!! as Serufu Yua; Synduality as Ellie; My Wife Has No Emotion as Mina; Umamusume: Pretty Derby as Copano Rickey

Konomi Inagaki (稲垣 好, Inagaki Konomi; born 24 July) is a Japanese voice actress from Niigata Prefecture who is affiliated with I'm Enterprise. After graduating from the Japan Narration Actor Institute, she made her voice acting debut in 2019. She played her first main role in 2022 as Serufu, the protagonist of the anime series Do It Yourself!!. She has also played the role of Ange in Black Summoner, Ellie in Synduality, Copano Rickey in Umamusume: Pretty Derby, and Mina in My Wife Has No Emotion.

== Filmography ==
=== Anime ===
2019

- Aikatsu on Parade! as Student

2022

- Black Summoner as Ange
- Do It Yourself!! as Serufu Yua
- Mobile Suit Gundam: The Witch from Mercury as Lilique Kadoka Lipati

2023

- Synduality as Ellie
- Umamusume: Pretty Derby Season 3 as Copano Rickey
- The Rising of the Shield Hero as Imiya

2024

- My Wife Has No Emotion as Mina
- Tower of God 2nd Season as Xiaxia
- You Are Ms. Servant as Naka Hikage

2025

- The Red Ranger Becomes an Adventurer in Another World as Yihdra Arvoln
- Uglymug, Epicfighter as Seika
- Wandance as Moa Mukogawa
- Li'l Miss Vampire Can't Suck Right as Yui Hashimoto
- Touring After the Apocalypse as Youko

2026

- Wash It All Away as Nairo Kataguchi
- Gals Can't Be Kind to Otaku!? as Kei Amane
- Shiboyugi: Playing Death Games to Put Food on the Table – 44: Cloudy Beach as Hizumi
- Reborn as a Space Mercenary: I Woke Up Piloting the Strongest Starship! as Mimi
- Devils' Crest as Sawa Ashihara

2027

- Arcanadea as Kaho Asagi

=== Video game ===
- Umamusume: Pretty Derby (2022) as Copano Rickey
- Mobile Legends: Bang Bang (2022) as Vexana
- Goddess of Victory: Nikke (2023) as Marciana
- Blue Archive (2025) as Rei Nomasa
- Honkai: Star Rail (2025) as Polyxia
- Genshin Impact (2025) as Jahoda
- Fire Emblem: Fortune's Weave (2026) as Ultand
