= Nia Liston: The Merciless Maiden =

Japanese light novel series

- First light novel volume cover

凶乱令嬢ニア・リストン 病弱令嬢に転生した神殺しの武人の華麗なる無双録 (Kyōran Reijō Nia Risuton: Byōjaku Reijō ni Tenseishita Kami-goroshi no Bujin no Kareinaru Musō Roku)
- Genre: Action; Fantasy; Martial arts
- Novel series
- Written by: Umikaze Minamino
- Published by: Shōsetsuka ni Narō
- Original run: May 25, 2019 – January 6, 2021
- Light novel
- Written by: Umikaze Minamino
- Illustrated by: Jishaku (1–2); Katana Canata (3–)
- Published by: Hobby Japan
- English publisher: NA: J-Novel Club
- Imprint: HJ Bunko
- Original run: September 30, 2022 – present
- Volumes: 12
- Manga
- Written by: Umikaze Minamino
- Illustrated by: Kabuto Kodai
- Published by: Square Enix
- English publisher: NA: Square Enix
- Imprint: Gangan Comics UP!
- Magazine: Manga Up!
- Original run: November 17, 2022 – present
- Volumes: 9
- Anime television series
- Directed by: Motoki Nakanishi; Haruta Segi (assistant)
- Written by: Gigaemon Ichikawa
- Music by: Naoki Endō
- Studio: Konami Animation
- Licensed by: Sentai Filmworks
- Original network: Tokyo MX, MBS, BS NTV
- Original run: October 6, 2026 – present
- Episodes: 4
- icon

Nia Liston: The Merciless Maiden (Japanese: 凶乱令嬢ニア・リストン 病弱令嬢に転生した神殺しの武人の華麗なる無双録, Hepburn: Kyoran Reijō Nia Risuton: Byōjaku Reijō ni Tenseishita Kami-goroshi no Bujin no Kareinaru Musō Roku), or simply Nia Liston, is a Japanese light novel series written by Umikaze Minamino and illustrated by Katana Canata. It was originally serialized on the user-generated novel publishing website Shōsetsuka ni Narō from May 2019 to January 2021. It was later acquired by Hobby Japan who began releasing it under their HJ Bunko imprint in September 2022. A manga adaptation illustrated by Kabuto Kodai began serialization on Square Enix's Manga Up! manga service in November 2022. An anime television series adaptation produced by Konami Animation premiered in October 2026.

== Plot ==
A great hero, who even killed a god, hoped to meet someone strong enough to kill her, but died of natural causes before she could achieve that goal. She woke up to find herself in the body of Nia Liston, the daughter of the Liston territory, who was consumed by illness. This possession occurred when Nia was originally sickly, and her parents, not wanting their daughter to die, sought a wizard's help, but when he realized the real Nia was already dead, he used the "Law of Resurrection" and put the great hero's soul in Nia's body. The great hero then purified her diseased body by manipulating "ki" and began living a second life as Nia.

== Characters ==
Nia Liston (ニア・リストン, Nia Risuton)
Voiced by: Honoka Inoue (Japanese); Brittney Karbowski (English)
A four year old girl, the only daughter of the fourth-order peer family Liston. She was plagued by a respiratory illness. On the verge of death a healer was brought to help her, but after she died, he instead put another soul in Nia's body. The nameless soul belonged to a peerless warrior who in life sought only to be defeated and aims while living as Nia to both repay the kindness of her new family and find that death in battle that eluded her in her previous life. After her revival Nia's story and health recovery jump starts her career as a budding start on the new technology known as magivision. She uses her rising fame to build to popularity of magivision sets which her family is heavily invested in.
Lynokis Funk (リノキス・ファンク, Rinokisu Fanku)
Voiced by: Fūka Izumi (Japanese); Luci Christian (English)
Lynokis is Nia’s personal maid and bodyguard. She is deeply devoted, protective, and affectionate toward Nia, having developed an intense, almost obsessive attachment to the young woman. Despite her impeccable manners and composed demeanor, Lynokis often acts as the voice of reason, keeping Nia's impulsive fighting instincts in check. However, toward anyone who disrespects, threatens, or harms her mistress, she becomes cold, hostile, and utterly merciless.
Hildetora Altoir (ヒルデトーラ・アルトワール, Hirudetōra Arutowāru)
Voiced by: Rina Honnizumi (Japanese); Natalie Rial (English)
The third princess of the Kingdom of Altoir. Although a member of the royal family, she is a star talent with the Royal Capital Broadcasting Station, and her catchphrase is “A Princess You Can Actually Meet.” She invites the new students, Nia and Relia, and the three of them work together to promote magical videos. Despite her young age, she also has an ambitious side, aiming to conquer the world through magical videos.
Reliared Silver (レリアレッド・シルヴァー, Reriareddo Shiruvuā)
Voiced by: Rina Hidaka (Japanese); Karlii Hoch (English)
She is the youngest daughter of the Silver family. She is a very popular TV personality at the Silver Domain Broadcasting Station, beloved for her straightforward and cheerful personality.
Anzel (アンゼル, Anzeru)
Voiced by: Taku Yashiro
Fressa (フレッサ, Furessa)
Voiced by: Yoko Hikasa
Gandolf Rogen (ガンドルフ・ローゲン, Gandorufu Rōgen)
Voiced by: Satoshi Hino
Bendelio (ベンデリオ, Benderio)
Voiced by: Kōichi Sakaguchi (Japanese); Ben McLaughlin (English)
Hyurence Altoire (ヒュレンツ・アルトワール, Hyurentsu Arutowāru)
Voiced by: Junichi Suwabe
Sharro White (シャロ・ホワイト, Sharo Howaito)
Voiced by: Maaya Uchida
Asuma (アスマ)
Voiced by: Kazuyuki Okitsu
Neal Liston (ニール・リストン, Nīru Risuton)
Voiced by: Tomoyo Takayanagi (Japanese); Shannon Emerick (English)
Lynette Blanc (リネット・ブラン, Rinetto Buran)
Voiced by: Yūki Urushiyama (Japanese); Olivia Swasey (English)
Essera Blanket (エスエラ・ブランケット, Esuera Buranketto)
Voiced by: Saeko Kamijō
Raffine Silver (ラフィネ・シルヴァー, Rafine Shiruvā)
Voiced by: Hitomi Ueda
Riculvitar Silver (リクルビタァ・シルヴァー, Rikurubita Shiruvā)
Voiced by: Azusa Tadokoro
Lilimi Silver (リリミ・シルヴァー, Ririmi Shiruvā)
Voiced by: Ayaka Ōhashi
Jayes (ジェイズ, Jeizu)
Voiced by: Shinya Takahashi (Japanese); Cris George (English)
Olnit Liston (オルニット・リストン, Ourinitto Risuton)
Voiced by: Yusuke Hoshino (Japanese); Philip Hays (English)
Arieux Liston (アリュー・リストン, Aryū Risuton)
Voiced by: Eriko Nakamura (Japanese); Patricia Duran (English)

== Media ==
=== Light novel ===
Written by Umikaze Minamino, Nia Liston: The Merciless Maiden was serialized on the user-generated novel publishing website Shōsetsuka ni Narō from May 25, 2019, to January 6, 2021. It was later acquired by Hobby Japan who began publishing it with illustrations by Jishaku under their HJ Bunko light novel imprint on September 30, 2022. Later volumes from volume 3 and onwards feature illustrations by Katana Canata. Twelve volumes have been released as of October 1, 2026.

During their panel at Anime NYC 2023, J-Novel Club announced that they had licensed the series for English publication.

No.	Original release date	Original ISBN	North American release date	North American ISBN
1	September 30, 2022	978-4-7986-2970-4	February 9, 2024	978-1-7183-1770-3
Prologue; Chapter 1: "Rising out of the Darkness"; Chapter 2: "The First Act of Love"; Chapter 3: "Magivision and MagiPads"; Chapter 4: "A Pivotal Winter"; Chapter 5: "Magivision Performance"; Chapter 6: "Nia Liston's Occupation Observation"; Chapter 7: "Work in the Capital"; Chapter 8: "After the Curtain Closes"; Epilogue
2	May 1, 2023	978-4-7986-3148-6	May 6, 2024	978-1-7183-1772-7
Prologue; Chapter 1: "The Brother's Greeting, the Girls' Meeting"; Chapter 2: "And So Begins a New School Life"; Chapter 3: "The Inaugural Meeting for Project Magivision"; Chapter 4: "The Shifty Shadow Rat"; Chapter 5: "The Martial Arts Tournament and a Review Meeting"; Chapter 6: "Infiltrating the Umbral Arena"; Chapter 7: "The Cursed Blade of the Sword Demon"; Chapter 8: "The Approach of Summer"; Epilogue
3	September 29, 2023	978-4-7986-3310-7	July 22, 2024	978-1-7183-1774-1
Prologue; Chapter 1: "An Arduous "Vacation""; Chapter 2: "A New Picture Project"; Chapter 3: "Capital Business"; Chapter 4: "Valiant Spirits"; Chapter 5: "An Adventuring Debut"; Epilogue
4	December 1, 2023	978-4-7986-3360-2	October 8, 2024	978-1-7183-1776-5
Prologue; Chapter 1: "Her Highness's New Project"; Chapter 2: "Contribution"; Chapter 3: "To the Empire of Flight"; Chapter 4: "Making Money"; Chapter 5: "Becoming Famous"; Chapter 6: "Assault"; Side story: "An Elegant Day in Helena Rhyme's Life—And What Lay Behind It"; Epilogue
5	April 1, 2024	978-4-7986-3504-0	January 2, 2025	978-1-7183-1778-9
Prologue; Chapter 1: "The Promotion Exam and What Lay After"; Chapter 2: "Wedding Preparations"; Chapter 3: "On to the Second Year"; Chapter 4: "A Summertime Prelude"; Chapter 5: "An Expedition Ends with Sky Pirates"; Epilogue; Extra: "A Job for Fressa"
6	August 1, 2024	978-4-7986-3597-2	March 28, 2025	978-1-7183-1780-2
Prologue; Chapter 1: "A Second Year, a Second Semester"; Chapter 2: "The Announcement"; Chapter 3: "Behind the Excitement"; Chapter 4: "Food for a New Project"; Chapter 5: "Behind the Scenes"; Intermission: "The Machinations of the Merchants"; Epilogue
7	November 29, 2024	978-4-7986-3694-8	June 26, 2025	978-1-7183-1782-6
Prologue; Chapter 1: "The Second Semester of the Third Year"; Chapter 2: "Let the Preliminaries Begin"; Chapter 3: "Registration Complete"; Chapter 4: "The First Days of Preliminaries"; Chapter 5: "The Third Day"; Chapter 6: "The Qualifiers"; Epilogue
8	May 1, 2025	978-4-7986-3823-2	December 18, 2025	978-1-7183-1784-0
Prologue; Chapter 1: "Before the Matches"; Chapter 2: "Let the Losers' Rounds Begin"; Chapter 3: "The Main Tournament Begins"; Chapter 4: "The First Rounds"; Chapter 5: "A Dealing in the Shadows"; Chapter 6: "The Matches Worth Seeing"; Chapter 7: "The Final Day"; Epilogue
9	September 1, 2025	978-4-7986-3956-7	May 26, 2026	978-1-7183-1786-4
Prologue; Chapter 1: "Nia's Worry"; Chapter 2: "A Troublesome Consultation"; Chapter 3: "The King Felling Incident"; Chapter 4: "Exile"; Chapter 5: "A Study Abroad in Marvella"; Chapter 6: "A Somewhat Shocking Abduction Case"; Chapter 7: "A Large-Scale Raid"; Epilogue; Side story: "The Movements of the Underworld"
10	January 30, 2026	978-4-7986-4080-8	September 1, 2026	978-1-7183-1788-8
Prologue; Chapter 1: "Marvella's Enemy"; Chapter 2: "At the Stronghold"; Chapter 3: "A Swarm of Ants"; Chapter 4: "An Indiscriminate Trampling"; Chapter 5: "A Triumphant and Honorable Return"; Chapter 6: "Her Students' Goals"; Epilogue
11	June 1, 2026	978-4-7986-4194-2	December 9, 2026	978-1-7183-1870-0
12	October 1, 2026	978-4-79-864303-8	—	—

=== Manga ===
A manga adaptation illustrated by Kabuto Kodai began serialization on Square Enix's Manga Up! manga service on November 17, 2022. The manga's chapters have been collected into nine tankōbon volumes as of October 2026.

The manga's chapters are published in English on Square Enix's Manga Up! Global service.

No.	Release date	ISBN
1	May 6, 2023	978-4-7575-8554-6
2	September 7, 2023	978-4-7575-8782-3
3	February 7, 2024	978-4-7575-9038-0
4	July 5, 2024	978-4-7575-9326-8
5	December 6, 2024	978-4-7575-9548-4
6	April 7, 2025	978-4-7575-9784-6
7	September 5, 2025	978-4-301-00036-5
8	February 6, 2026	978-4-301-00308-3
9	October 7, 2026	978-4-301-00794-4

=== Anime ===
An anime television series adaptation was announced on January 28, 2026. The series was produced by Konami Animation and directed by Motoki Nakanishi, with Haruta Segi serving as assistant director, Gigaemon Ichikawa handling series composition, Yūki Itō and Kana Tosaoka designing the characters, and Naoki Endō composing the music. It premiered on October 6, 2026, on Tokyo MX and other channels, and will run for two consecutive cours. The first opening theme song is "Respawn!!" (リスポーン!!), performed by Tsunomaki Watame, and the first ending theme song is "Tokimeki Un・Deux・Trois♪" (ときめきアン・ドゥ・トロワ♪; 'Heart Fluttering 1, 2, 3♪'), performed by Honoka Inoue, Rina Honnizumi and Rina Hidaka as their respective characters. In August 2026, Sentai Filmworks announced that it would stream the series on Hidive as part of a multi-year deal and expanded partnership with Mainichi Broadcasting. Hidive also announced an English dub will premiere on November 18.

==== Episodes ====
No.	Title	Directed by (Note: Production staff information is taken from the ending credits of each episode.)	Written by	Storyboard by	Original release date
1	"Emerging from the Darkness"; Transliteration: "Yami Yori Ukabite" (Japanese: 闇より浮かびて)	Unknown	Unknown	TBA	October 6, 2026
On a battlefield, a powerful warrior passes away peacefully while wishing she had fallen in battle to a more powerful foe. At that moment, she wakes up in the body of the four year old girl Nia Liston. A mysterious man admits that the original Nia had already passed away from illness, so he placed the warrior's soul into her body to fool her parents into thinking he cured her. The warrior cannot remember the details of her past life, but still retains most of her abilities and is able to cure her new body's illness. As she recovers, taking on the identity of Nia, she gradually learns from her personal maid Lynokis that the Liston family are very high ranking nobles in the Kingdom of Altoire. Her older brother Neal then shows her magivision, a magical device that shows broadcasts similar to television which she becomes fascinated with. Her parents also own the Liston Broadcasting Station and ask her to appear on magivision to show the kingdom that she recovered. She agrees and quickly becomes a celebrity in the kingdom, so she decides to make further appearances to help alleviate the debt her parents accrued for her treatment. Thanks to her efforts, Nia is able to promote the spread of magivision and is invited to take part in a play hosted by the Ice Rose Theater Company in the capital. Nia eagerly accepts the invitation, hoping that she will be able to find somebody capable of killing her in the capital.
2	"A Job in the Royal Capital"; Transliteration: "Ōto de no Shigoto" (Japanese: 王都での仕事)	Unknown	Unknown	TBA	October 13, 2026
Nia and Lynokis arrive at the capital and meet the twin owners of the Ice Rose Theater Company, Julian and Lucida Lordheart. The Lordhearts decide to hire Nia to be the co-star for their lead actress Sharro White, both to use Nia's popularity to promote the unproven actress as well as hoping Nia will be able to deal with her difficult personality which has caused all her previous co-stars to quit. During rehearsal, despite complaining about Nia being a newbie, Sharro gives her several tips on how to improve her acting skills, and the two end up befriending each other. One week before the debut of their new play, The Girl Who Fell In Love, Nia offers to help promote the play on magivision, and the Lordhearts instruct Sharro to participate. However, on the way the shoot, Sharro is accosted by a gang of thugs. Nia arrives and easily beats them up, challenging them to bring their strongest fighters to face her in two weeks. A bewildered Sharro thanks Nia for saving her, and the two continue practicing for the play until the opening night arrives.
3	"After the Curtain Falls"; Transliteration: "Butai no Maku ga Orita Ato" (Japanese: 舞台の幕が下りた後)	Unknown	Unknown	TBA	October 20, 2026
The play proves to be a huge success. Meanwhile, mafia bodyguard Anzel is ordered by his boss to eliminate Nia to get revenge for the men she beat up. Sharro, intrigued by Nia's desire fight, asks to observe her battle against he mafia, to which Nia reluctantly agrees. The next day, Nia spends most of her time with her family, but sneaks away at night in order to raid the mafia's hideout. There, she encounters Anzel and easily defeats him despite his best efforts. She subsequently defeats the rest of the mafia and intimidates the mafia boss into keeping their fight a secret. As Sharro watches, she is surprised that Lynokis is also present. Lynokis reveals she knows about Nia's strength and is ashamed that she cannot be Nia's protector if she is weaker than her. Afterwards, Nia and Lynokis return to the Liston estate, where Lynokis asks Nia to train her to be stronger so she can be a proper bodyguard to her. One year later, Lynokis accompanies Nia as she goes to her first day at Altoire Academy.
4	"The Girls Meet"; Transliteration: "Shōjo-tachi no Deai" (Japanese: 少女たちの出会い)	TBA	TBA	TBA	October 27, 2026
As Nia arrives at Altoire Academy, she meets Princess Hildetaura Altoire and Reliared Silver, who both are also child celebrities on magivision. Hildetaura tells Nia and Reliared that she plans to proliferate magivision around not just Altoire, but also foreign countries so that Altoire will ultimately dominate the world through its monopoly on magivision. Both girls agree, with Nia hoping the expansion of magivision means more opportunities to find a worthy opponent. However, Hildetaura doesn't have a plan to achieve this and hopes Nia and Reliared can help come up with one. Reliared also admits that like the Listons, the Silvers also took on heavy debt in their push to advance magivision. After filming themselves getting their school uniforms, Reliared introduces her older sisters Raffinee and Ririmi to Nia. During their conversation, Nia learns that one of the instructors of the popular Heavenstrike martial arts style will be visiting the school, and she gets excited about meeting him to see how strong he is.
5	"Project MagicVision Kickoff Meeting"; Transliteration: "MajikkuBijon Fukyū Katsudō Kaigi" (Japanese: 魔法映像(マジックビジョン)普及活動会議)	TBA	TBA	TBA	November 3, 2026
Nia and Reliared attend their school's physical examination, and Reliared becomes very competitive, determined to come out ahead of Nia. Nia meanwhile follows Lynokis' advice to hold back her full strength so as not to attract too much unwanted attention, but still easily defeats Reliared in every test. She then goes to see the Heavenstriker martial arts club, but is disappointed to see that they are not nearly as strong as she was hoping. She tries to politely decline joining them, but when the instructor proves to be too pushy, Nia instead goads him into challenging Lynokis to a duel by claiming she is her instructor. Despite initial impressions, Lynokis easily defeats the instructor in a single strike. Nia and her friends then gather together to brainstorm ways to make Magivision more popular, with the main stumbling blocking being the cost of each MagiPad making them out of reach for commoners. When Nia suggests they find ways to have viewers participate in Magivision programs, that inspires Hildetaura to organize a martial arts tournament the audience can participate in.
6	"The Academy Martial Arts Tournament Is On!"; Transliteration: "Gakuin Butō Taikai, Kaisai!" (Japanese: 学院武闘大会、開催！)	TBA	TBA	TBA	November 10, 2026
As Hildetaura organizes the martial arts tournament, Nia has no interest in it since only students would be participating. She approaches Anzel to see if he found any strong opponents for her, but he tells her she has already scared off all potential challengers. He does inform her about the Umbral Arena, an underground ring that hosts no holds barred fights. Nia is excited at the prospect of going to the Umbral Arena, but Lynokis warns her that going there even just to spectate risks her being recognized and creating a scandal for the Listons. Preparations for the martial arts tournament commence, and Hildetaura interviews Neal, who plans to participate. The next day, a group of boys harass Nia and Reliareed in an attempt to join their martial arts club, until Nia intimidates them by kicking one of their wooden swords away. An older student, Sanowil Badr, notices Nia's prowess and challenges to a sparring match to test her strength but she easily breaks his sword. During the tournament, Neal performs well, but ultimately loses to Sanowil in the quarterfinals. Afterwards, Nia offers a deal to the Heavenstriker instructor to teach him some of her techniques in return for getting her into the Umbral Arena. Lynokis meanwhile suspects Nia's plans and prepares to stop her.
7	"Infiltrating the Umbral Arena"; Transliteration: "Sen'nyū, Yami no Tōgi-jō!" (Japanese: 潜入、闇の闘技場)	TBA	TBA	TBA	November 17, 2026
Nia convinces the instructor, Gandolph, to take her to the Umbral Arena by posing as her father. As the martial arts tournament is broadcast to magivision, Nia sneaks out of the school, disguises herself by dying her hair, and meets with Gandolph to enter the Umbral Arena. They then witness the various fights while Nia correctly guesses which fighter will win, allowing Gandolph to win all of his bets. However, she is caught off guard when she sees Lynokis among the contestants, and Gandolph points out that Lynokis must be worried about her, but is concerned she will run into the Sword Demon Asuma Hinoki, a very powerful adventurer and swordsman who happens to be competing tonight. As Asuma begins defeating opponents, Nia realizes he is wielding a demon blade, which grants him power at the cost of self control. Asuma then challenges Lynokis and defeats her by cutting off her arm. Seeing that Asuma is strong, Nia intervenes before he can finish off Lynokis.
8	"The Sword Demon's Blade"; Transliteration: "Kenki no Maken" (Japanese: 剣鬼の魔剣)	TBA	TBA	TBA	November 24, 2026

== Reception ==
By April 2024, the series had over 400,000 copies in circulation.

== See also ==
- Kunon the Sorcerer Can See, another light novel series written by Umikaze Minamino
