= Black Summoner =

Japanese light novel series

- First light novel volume cover

黒の召喚士 (Kuro no Shōkanshi)
- Genre: Fantasy; Isekai
- Novel series
- Written by: Doufu Mayoi
- Published by: Shōsetsuka ni Narō
- Original run: October 6, 2014 – July 1, 2024
- Light novel
- Written by: Doufu Mayoi
- Illustrated by: Kurogin (1–6); DaiXt (7–)
- Published by: Overlap
- English publisher: NA: J-Novel Club Yen Press (print)
- Imprint: Overlap Bunko
- Original run: June 25, 2016 – present
- Volumes: 23
- Manga
- Written by: Doufu Mayoi
- Illustrated by: Gin Ammo
- Published by: Overlap
- English publisher: NA: J-Novel Club Yen Press (print)
- Magazine: Comic Gardo
- Original run: January 11, 2018 – October 13, 2026
- Volumes: 26
- Anime television series
- Directed by: Yoshimasa Hiraike
- Produced by: Koutarou Nakamura; Mikito Kyo; Masao Fukuda; Takumi Furuya; Tatsuya Ooshita; Yasushi Fukushima
- Written by: Yoshimasa Hiraike
- Music by: Michiru; Yuria Miyazono
- Studio: Satelight
- Licensed by: Crunchyroll: SEA: Medialink
- Original network: Tokyo MX
- Original run: July 9, 2022 – September 24, 2022
- Episodes: 12
- icon

Black Summoner (Japanese: 黒の召喚士, Hepburn: Kuro no Shōkanshi) is a Japanese light novel series written by Doufu Mayoi. It began publication online on the Shōsetsuka ni Narō novel posting website in October 2014. Overlap began publishing the series with illustrations by Kurogin under their Overlap Bunko imprint in June 2016. A manga adaptation with illustrations by Gin Ammo was serialized in Overlap's Comic Gardo website from January 2018 to October 2026. An anime television series adaptation produced by Satelight aired from July to September 2022.

== Plot ==
Waking up in a strange new place with no memory of his past life, Kelvin learns that he's bartered away those very memories in exchange for powerful new abilities during his recent transmigration. Heading out into a whole new world as a Summoner—with his first Follower being the very goddess who brought him over. Kelvin begins his new life as an adventurer, and it isn't long before he discovers his hidden disposition as a battle junkie. From the Black Knight of the Ancient Castle of Evil Spirits to the demon within the Hidden Cave of the Sage, he revels in the fight against one foe after another.

== Characters ==
Kelvin (ケルヴィン, Keruvin)
Voiced by: Koki Uchiyama (Japanese); Van Barr (English)
The main protagonist who is a reincarnated Summoner, the only S-rank summoner in the world. He bartered away his memories of his previous life to gain useful abilities; though only memory of himself, akin to amnesia. His current contracted servants are Clotho, Gerard, Melfina, and Sera. He is a "battle junkie", and gets extremely happy when fighting strong opponents, almost to a sadistic extent. This is proven when he orchestrated a full incident just to get a chance to fight the heroes. Despite that, he is very kind, training the heroes and helping people whenever he can. A natural chick magnet, Kelvin is in romantic relationships with Melfina, Efil, Sera and Ange.
Efil (エフィル, Efiru)
Voiced by: Manaka Iwami (Japanese); Bev Mageto (English)
Originally a slave, she is a Half-Elf, bought by Kelvin and trained to be a formidable Archer. She had a curse to set anybody she touches on fire, until Kelvin came and broke it. Like Melfina, she loves Kelvin and acts like the "second wife". She tends to be very possessive whenever a pretty woman hits on him. She is the perfect homemaker, even though they have maids, and is an excellent cook and seamstress.
Melfina (メルフィーナ, Merufīna)
Voiced by: Reina Ueda (Japanese); Tia Ballard (English)
The Goddess of Reincarnation, she is the one responsible for giving Kelvin his powers in exchange for his memories. Kelvin [before losing his memories] was so infatuated with her, he convinced her to come with him to his new world. As she is a goddess, she has a very high level, over 100. She is so strong that Kelvin himself, an S-rank summoner, could not summon her when he entered the world. Her true form was hidden, appearing as an interactive game menu until creating an artificial body for herself which Kelvin can summon. In her artificial body, she is shown to look like a very beautiful angel, with wings, light purple hair, and a white dress. She calls herself Kelvin's fiance/wife. She is a glutton, who even sleep talks about food.
Clotho (クロト, Kuroto)
Voiced by: Randhi (Japanese); Mary Morgan (English)
Clotho is a contracted Slime used by Kelvin. He is the first monster contracted by Kelvin, and is immediately put to use by him to kill another slime. He has since evolved into a Slime Gluttonia, a monster almost as strong as Demon Lords. He typically acts like a very cute dog/animal.
Gerard (ジェラール, Jerāru)
Voiced by: Yōsuke Akimoto (Japanese); Bruce Carey (English)
He is a Blackghost Knight, bound to earth by the pain and anger of losing his wife and kids. He is Kelvin's second contracted monster. As of episode 5, he has evolved into an Abyssal Knight Commander. He sees and addresses Kelvin as "[his] King". Despite this, they work together as equals during quests. He respects Kelvin greatly, especially since Kelvin promised to avenge his family who were consequently killed by the actions of a certain nation. He tends to tease Kelvin about his harem, especially during awkward moments with the girls.
Sera (セラ)
Voiced by: Minori Suzuki (Japanese); Alexis Tipton (English)
She is the daughter of the former Demon King Gustav, who was sealed away for her safety. She was taught to become an Arcane Pugilist and became Kelvin's third contracted servant. Despite her age, Sera is like a big child, since the world is all so new to her. She's very playful and somewhat of a battle junkie like Kelvin. With Kelvin, she tends to be playfully smug and likes teasing him. Like the other girls, she also competes for Kelvin's affection, such as who will sleep next to him at night.
Ange (アンジェ, Anje)
Voiced by: Konomi Inagaki (Japanese); Brittney Karbowski (English)
Receptionist of the Adventurer's Guild in Parth. She is secretly an assassin meant to keep an eye on Kelvin as oversight from the Reincarnation process, though she ends up in love with him as well. This is the more awkward of Kelvin's romances as Ange does not know how to express love normally; all she knows is her fake persona and how to kill.
Rion (リオン)
Voiced by: Yume Miyamoto (Japanese); Kristi Rothrock (English)
A reincarnated Hero summoned by Kelvin, who he adopts as his sister; she previously died young from illness. Kelvin is secretly grooming her as a Hero, but lets Rion enjoy her life as she wishes. Rion loves fantasy stories, which is why she adapts to the new world easily. Her adventuring partner is a wolf named Alex, whom Kelvin tamed for her. Rion feels no shame in exposing skin, from her revealing adventurer gear to simply being naked out of the bath; Alex has to act as a censor bar.
Claire (クレア)
Voiced by: Riho Sugiyama (Japanese)
The owner of a tavern Kelvin stayed at until buying his house. She is like a mother to him, and like Gerard, teases him on his collection of cute girls. She taught Efil how to cook.
Tsubaki Fujiwara (藤原つばき)
Voiced by: Shizuka Itou (Japanese)
The queen of Toraj, a very beautiful and bold woman. She is descended by other-worlders like Kelvin from Japan, which is why the nation resembles Japan heavily. Kelvin came to Toraj to secure rice, which she happily gave them after they caught a band of thieves and defeated a local boss. She is fond of Kelvin as well as Efil's cooking, so much so that she tried to seduce him to stay, but to no avail.

== Media ==
=== Light novels ===
Written by Doufu Mayoi, the series was published online on Shōsetsuka ni Narō from October 6, 2014, to July 1, 2024. The series was later acquired by Overlap, who began publishing the series with illustrations by Kurogin (and DaiXt as of volume 7) under their Overlap Bunko imprint on June 25, 2016. As of March 2026, twenty-three volumes have been released. In July 2020, J-Novel Club announced they licensed the series for English publication. In August 2023, Yen Press announced that they would release print versions of the light novel.

==== Volumes ====
No.	Title	Original release date	English release date
1	The Bound Demon; Fūin Sareshi Akuma (封印されし悪魔)	June 25, 2016; 978-4-86554-117-5	September 9, 2020 (digital); February 20, 2024 (print); 978-1-7183-7548-2 (digital); 978-1-9753-9220-8 (print)
Prologue: Summoner; Chapter 1: The Town of Parth; Chapter 2: Black Spirit Knight; Chapter 3: Hero; Chapter 4: Demon; Side Story 1: Demon Lord Gustav's Daughter; Side Story 2: The Heroes of Deramis; Side Story 3: Colette's Tribulations
2	The False Champions; Itsuwari no Eiyū (偽りの英雄)	September 25, 2016; 978-4-86554-157-1	November 11, 2020 (digital); June 18, 2024 (print); 978-1-7183-7550-5 (digital); 978-1-9753-9221-5 (print)
Chapter 1: Black Wind; Chapter 2: Champion; Chapter 3: Toraj, the Country of Water; Side Story 1: The Knights of Alcahl; Side Story 2: The End of a Dream
3	The Army of Monsters; Majū no Gunzei (魔獣の軍勢)	January 25, 2017; 978-4-86554-192-2	January 30, 2021 (digital); October 15, 2024 (print); 978-1-7183-7552-9 (digital); 978-1-9753-9229-1 (print)
Chapter 1: New Family; Chapter 2: Power-Leveling; Chapter 3: The Village of Elves; Chapter 4: Feast; Side Story 1: The Battle Junkie's Little Sister; Side Story 2: To Each Their Cooking
4	The Pristine Ice Princess; Mukunaru Kōri Hime (無垢なる氷姫)	May 25, 2017; 978-4-86554-217-2	April 11, 2021 (digital); February 18, 2025 (print); 978-1-7183-7554-3 (digital); 978-1-9753-9230-7 (print)
Chapter 1: Divine Pillars; Chapter 2: Promotion Ceremony; Chapter 3: Present; Chapter 4: Declaration of War; Side Story: The Phantom Springs of Toraj
5	The Demon Lord Rises; Mezameshi Maō (目覚めし魔王)	August 25, 2017; 978-4-86554-251-6	June 15, 2021 (digital); June 10, 2025 (print); 978-1-7183-7556-7 (digital); 978-1-9753-9231-4 (print)
Chapter 1: The Dragon Knight Order; Chapter 2: The Demon Lord Subjugation Alliance; Chapter 3: Descent
6	The Red Maidens; Beni no Otome (紅の乙女)	January 25, 2018; 978-4-86554-307-0	October 15, 2021 (digital); December 16, 2025 (print); 978-1-7183-7558-1 (digital); 978-1-9753-9232-1 (print)
Chapter 1: The Freeloading Princess; Chapter 2: Company Trip; Chapter 3: Beast King Festival; Chapter 4: Wall; Chapter 5: Deadly Poison; Side Story: The Other Beast King Festival
7	The Creeping Darkness; Ugomeku Yami (蠢く闇)	June 25, 2018; 978-4-86554-370-4	December 23, 2021 (digital); June 9, 2026 (print); 978-1-7183-7560-4 (digital); 978-1-9753-9233-8 (print)
Chapter 1: Firing Hammer; Chapter 2: Semifinals; Chapter 3: Profession of Love; Chapter 4: Enjoyment; Side Story: The Other Beast King Festival (Cont.)
8	The Pope of the Holy Empire; Kami no Kuni ni Zasuru Sumeragi (神の国に座する皇)	December 25, 2018; 978-4-86554-416-9	April 8, 2022 (digital); October 13, 2026 (print); 978-1-7183-7562-8 (digital); 978-1-9753-9234-5 (print)
Chapter 1: Apostles; Chapter 2: The Holy Empire of Deramis; Chapter 3: The Heroes Return; Chapter 4: The Catacombs of Heroic Spirit; Side Story: The Saint's Elegant Day Off
9	The True Champion; Shinnaru Eiyū (真なる英雄)	April 25, 2019; 978-4-86554-480-0	June 24, 2022 (digital); 978-1-7183-7564-2
Chapter 1: Pinnacle; Chapter 2: The Tribulations of a King; Chapter 3: Dragon King
10	The Empress Returns; Nyotei no Kikan (女帝の帰還)	August 25, 2019; 978-4-86554-534-0	September 23, 2022 (digital); 978-1-7183-7566-6
Chapter 1: Abyssland; Chapter 2: The Demon Lord's Ghost; Chapter 3: Growth and Results; Chapter 4: Homecomings Have to Be a Bit Dramatic
11	The Horn Sounds in the Abyss; Tsunobue Hibiku Shinen (角笛響く深淵)	February 25, 2020; 978-4-86554-613-2	December 23, 2022 (digital); 978-1-7183-7568-0
Chapter 1: Sisterly Fights Can Get Fierce; Chapter 2: Sister Ellen; Chapter 3: An Old Man's Tribulation; Chapter 4: Hero vs. Hero
12	Black Pierces the Sky; Ten Chuān no Kuro (天穿の黒)	May 25, 2020; 978-4-86554-662-0	April 7, 2023 (digital); 978-1-7183-7570-3
Chapter 1: Fated Enemy; Chapter 2: Godslaying; Interim: Memories of the Past
13	Blessings of the Dragon Kings; Ryūō no Kago (竜王の加護)	October 25, 2020; 978-4-86554-762-7	July 10, 2023 (digital); 978-1-7183-7572-7
Chapter 1: Towards the Final Battle; Chapter 2: Everyone's Wishes
14	Summoning the Goddess of Reincarnation; Tensei-shin no Shōkan (転生神の召喚)	March 25, 2021; 978-4-86554-868-6	September 22, 2023 (digital); 978-1-7183-7574-1
Chapter 1: Smothered Mate; Chapter 2: Magic Eye Monster; Chapter 3: Hero and Holy Sword and Love; Chapter 4: Consumed with Love; Special Episode: DarkMel's Reminiscence
15	The Rising of the Battle Junkie; Sentō-kyō no Nariagari (戦闘狂の成り上がり)	August 25, 2021; 978-4-86554-977-5	December 18, 2023 (digital); 978-1-7183-7576-5
Chapter 1: Final Battle; Chapter 2: Towards a New Age; Chapter 3: Battle Rally
16	Adventurers of the Labyrinthine Country; Meikyū-koku no Bōken-sha (迷宮国の冒険者)	February 25, 2022; 978-4-8240-0110-8	March 12, 2024 (digital); 978-1-7183-7578-9
Chapter 1: Academy City; Chapter 2: Entrance Exam; Chapter 3: Labyrinth Country Pub
17	Academy Battlefront; Gakuen Sensen (学園戦線)	June 25, 2022; 978-4-8240-0211-2	June 5, 2024 (digital); 978-1-7183-7580-2
Chapter 1: School Life of Dreams; Chapter 2: Exhibition Match
18	Distorted Love; Ibitsunaru Ai (歪なる愛)	September 25, 2022; 978-4-8240-0294-5	August 27, 2024 (digital); 978-1-7183-7582-6
Chapter 1: Conclusion and Manifestation; Chapter 2: The Defense of Leigant
19	Authority Invasion; Kennō Shinkō (権能侵攻)	April 25, 2023; 978-4-8240-0468-0	November 27, 2024 (digital); 978-1-7183-7584-0
Chapter 1: Tempering; Chapter 2: Brawn; Chapter 3: Gap; Chapter 4: Lethality
20	Mingling Twin Orges; Majiwaru sō Oni (交わる双鬼)	December 25, 2023; 978-4-8240-0684-4	March 26, 2025 (digital); 978-1-7183-7586-4
Chapter 1: The Three Great Authorities; Chapter 2: Control; Chapter 3: Border; Chapter 4: The Two Orges; Special Chapter: Additional Printing Celebration Party
21	Iron Vampire; Kurogane no Kyūketsu Hime (黒鉄の吸血姫)	December 25, 2024; 978-4-8240-1027-8	August 22, 2025 (digital); 978-1-7183-7588-8
Chapter 1: Fusion; Chapter 2: Unification; Chapter 3: God of Another World; Chapter 4: New Life; Chapter 5: Paramita; Chapter 6: I Object!
22	Curtains Rise on the Black Celebration; Kuro Utage no Makuaki (黒宴の幕開き)	July 25, 2025; 978-4-8240-1255-5	March 20, 2026 (digital); 978-1-7183-7590-1
Chapter 1: The Ceremony Approaches; Chapter 2: Wedding in Trycen; Chapter 3: Wedding in Parth
23	The Imposter God; Nisemonotaru Kami (贋物たる神)	March 25, 2026; 978-4-8240-1565-5	January 4, 2027 (digital)

=== Manga ===
A manga adaptation, illustrated by Gin Ammo, was serialized on Comic Gardo from January 11, 2018 to October 13, 2026. The manga's individual chapters were collected into twenty-six tankōbon volumes released from June 25, 2018, to October 20, 2026. J-Novel Club is also publishing the manga in English. During their panel at New York Comic Con 2023, Yen Press announced that they would start publishing the volumes in print in March 2024.

==== Volumes ====
No.	Original release date	Original ISBN	English release date	English ISBN
1	June 25, 2018	978-4-86554-366-7	January 6, 2021 (digital); March 19, 2024 (print)	978-1-7183-1620-1 (digital); 978-1-9753-9222-2 (print)
Chapter 1: Summoner; Chapter 2: Black Spirit Knight (Part 1); Chapter 3: Black Spirit Knight (Part 2); Chapter 4: Black Spirit Knight (Part 3); Chapter 5: Otherworlder; Original Short Story: Efil's First Dish
2	November 25, 2018	978-4-86554-419-0	June 9, 2021 (digital); June 18, 2024 (print)	978-1-7183-1621-8 (digital); 978-1-9753-9223-9 (print)
Chapter 6: Goddess (Part 1); Chapter 7: Goddess (Part 2); Chapter 8: Demon (Part 1); Chapter 9: Demon (Part 2); Chapter 10: Demon (Part 3); Chapter 11: Demon (Part 4); Chapter 12: Demon Lord Gustav's Daughter; Original Short Story: Sera's First Errand
3	April 25, 2018	978-4-86554-485-5	August 4, 2021 (digital); September 17, 2024 (print)	978-1-7183-1622-5 (digital); 978-1-9753-9224-6 (print)
Chapter 13: Black Wind (Part 1); Chapter 14: Black Wind (Part 2); Chapter 15: Black Wind (Part 3); Chapter 16: Black Wind (Part 4); Chapter 17: Heroes (Part 1); Chapter 18: Heroes (Part 2); Chapter 19: Heroes (Part 3); Chapter 20: Heroes (Part 4); Original Short Story: The Tribulations of a Protagonist
4	August 25, 2018	978-4-86554-539-5	September 23, 2021 (digital); December 10, 2024 (print)	978-1-7183-1623-2 (digital); 978-1-9753-9225-3 (print)
Chapter 21: Heroes (Part 5); Chapter 22: Toraj, The Country of Water; Chapter 23: New Family (Part 1); Chapter 24: New Family (Part 2); Chapter 25: New Family (Part 3); Chapter 26: Declaration of War (Part 1); Chapter 27: Declaration of War (Part 2); Chapter 28: Declaration of War (Part 3); Original Short Story: Simple Cooking Session with Mel and Rion
5	November 25, 2019	978-4-86554-579-1	January 26, 2022 (digital); March 18, 2025 (print)	978-1-7183-1624-9 (digital); 978-1-9753-9226-0 (print)
Chapter 29: The Village of Elves (Part 1); Chapter 30: The Village of Elves (Part 2); Chapter 31: The Village of Elves (Part 3); Chapter 32: The Village of Elves (Part 4); Chapter 33: The Village of Elves (Part 5); Chapter 34: The Village of Elves (Part 6); Chapter 35: The Village of Elves (Part 7); Chapter 36: The Village of Elves (Part 8); Original Short Story: Family Simulation
6	March 25, 2020	978-4-86554-631-6	May 11, 2022 (digital); August 26, 2025 (print)	978-1-7183-1625-6 (digital); 978-1-9753-9227-7 (print)
Chapter 37: The Village of Elves (Part 9); Chapter 38: Peach Ogre (Part 1); Chapter 39: Peach Ogre (Part 2); Chapter 40: Promotion Ceremony (Part 1); Chapter 41: Promotion Ceremony (Part 2); Chapter 42: Promotion Ceremony (Part 3); Chapter 43: Promotion Ceremony (Part 4); Chapter 44: Promotion Ceremony (Part 5); Original Short Story: Sudden Fashion Check
7	July 25, 2020	978-4-86554-710-8	August 31, 2022 (digital); December 16, 2025 (print)	978-1-7183-1626-3 (digital); 978-1-9753-9228-4 (print)
Chapter 45: Exhibition March (Part 1); Chapter 46: Exhibition March (Part 2); Chapter 47: Exhibition March (Part 3); Chapter 48: Exhibition March (Part 4); Chapter 49: Present (Part 1); Chapter 50: Present (Part 2); Chapter 51: Present (Part 3); Chapter 52: Dragon Knight Order (Part 1); Original Short Story: Efil's Cooking Classroom with Sylvia's Parth (2nd Try)
8	December 25, 2020	978-4-86554-815-0	October 19, 2022 (digital); July 28, 2026 (print)	978-1-7183-1627-0 (digital); 979-8-8554-2539-0 (print)
Chapter 53: Dragon Knight Order (Part 2); Chapter 54: Dragon Knight Order (Part 3); Chapter 55: Dragon Knight Order (Part 4); Chapter 56: Dragon Knight Order (Part 1); Chapter 57: Dragon Knight Order (Part 5); Chapter 58: Dragon Knight Order (Part 6); Chapter 59: Dragon Knight Order (Part 7); Original Short Story: Clotho's Terrifying Experience
9	March 25, 2021	978-4-86554-878-5	December 14, 2022 (digital); October 27, 2026 (print)	978-1-7183-1628-7 (digital); 979-8-8554-2540-6 (print)
Chapter 60: Dahak The Black Dragon (Part 1); Chapter 61: Dahak The Black Dragon (Part 2); Chapter 62: Dahak The Black Dragon (Part 3); Chapter 63: Dahak The Black Dragon (Part 4); Chapter 64: Demon Subjugation Alliance (Part 1); Chapter 65: Demon Subjugation Alliance (Part 2); Chapter 66: Demon Subjugation Alliance (Part 3); Original Short Story: The New Maid's "Menter"
10	July 25, 2021	978-4-86554-970-6	February 15, 2023	978-1-7183-1629-4
Chapter 67: Demon Subjugation Alliance (Part 4); Chapter 68: Demon Subjugation Alliance (Part 5); Chapter 69: Demon Subjugation Alliance (Part 6); Chapter 70: Demon Subjugation Alliance (Part 7); Chapter 71: Demon Subjugation Alliance (Part 8); Chapter 72: Demon Subjugation Alliance (Part 9); Chapter 73: Demon Subjugation Alliance (Part 10); Original Short Story: Black Dragon Line Heading for Trycen
11	October 25, 2021	978-4-8240-0039-2	April 19, 2023	978-1-7183-1630-0
Chapter 74: Demon Subjugation Alliance (Part 11); Chapter 75: Demon Subjugation Alliance (Part 12); Chapter 76: Battling The Generals (Part 1); Chapter 77: Battling The Generals (Part 2); Chapter 78: Battling The Generals (Part 3); Chapter 79: Battling The Generals (Part 4); Chapter 80: Battling The Generals (Part 5); Chapter 81: Battling The Generals (Part 6); Original Short Story: Kelvin Saw Nothing
12	February 25, 2022	978-4-8240-0121-4	June 14, 2023	978-1-7183-1631-7
Chapter 82: Merchant of Death (Part 1); Chapter 83: Merchant of Death (Part 2); Chapter 84: Merchant of Death (Part 3); Chapter 85: Merchant of Death (Part 4); Chapter 86: Merchant of Death (Part 5); Chapter 87: Merchant of Death (Part 6); Chapter 88: Descent (Part 1); Chapter 89: Descent (Part 2); Original Short Story: Demon Lord Discoveries
13	June 25, 2022	978-4-8240-0222-8	October 9, 2023	978-1-7183-1632-4
Chapter 90: Descent (Part 3); Chapter 91: Descent (Part 4); Chapter 92: Descent (Part 5); Chapter 93: Revenge; Chapter 94: The Princess' Lodging (Part 1); Chapter 95: The Princess' Lodging (Part 2); Chapter 96: The Princess' Lodging (Part 3); Original Short Story: Colette The Coordinator is One Bossy Bee
14	September 25, 2022	978-4-8240-0301-0	December 22, 2023	978-1-7183-1633-1
Chapter 97: Naming Ceremony (Part 1); Chapter 98: Naming Ceremony (Part 2); Chapter 99: Naming Ceremony (Part 3); Chapter 100: Naming Ceremony (Part 4); Chapter 101: Naming Ceremony (Part 5); Chapter 102: Beast King Festival (Part 1); Chapter 103: Beast King Festival (Part 2); Chapter 104: Beast King Festival (Part 3)
15	January 25, 2023	978-4-8240-0403-1	April 2, 2024	978-1-7183-1634-8
Chapter 105: Beast King Festival (Part 4); Chapter 106: Beast King Festival (Part 5); Chapter 107: Beast King Festival (Part 6); Chapter 108: Beast King Festival (Part 7); Chapter 109: Beast King Festival (Part 8); Chapter 110: Confession (Part 1); Chapter 111: Confession (Part 2); Original Short Story: Eve of the Beast King Festival
16	May 25, 2023	978-4-8240-0514-4	June 14, 2024	978-1-7183-1635-5
Chapter 112: Confession (Part 3); Chapter 113: Confession (Part 4); Chapter 114: Confession (Part 5); Chapter 115: Confession (Part 6); Chapter 116: Confession (Part 7); Chapter 117: Confession (Part 8); Chapter 118: Confession (Part 9); Chapter 119: Confession (Part 10); Original Short Story: Even Apostles Can Have A Girls-Only Party
17	October 25, 2023	978-4-8240-0644-8	August 29, 2024	978-1-7183-1636-2
Chapter 120: Apostles (Part 1); Chapter 121: Apostles (Part 2); Chapter 122: Apostles (Part 3); Chapter 123: Apostles (Part 4); Chapter 124: Deramis (Part 1); Chapter 125: Deramis (Part 2); Chapter 126: Return of the Hero (Part 1); Chapter 127: Return of the Hero (Part 2); Original Short Story: How A Maid Should Be
18	February 25, 2024	978-4-8240-0749-0	November 29, 2024	978-1-7183-1637-9
Chapter 128: The Catacombs of Heroic Spirits (Part 1); Chapter 129: The Catacombs of Heroic Spirits (Part 2); Chapter 130: The Catacombs of Heroic Spirits (Part 3); Chapter 131: The Catacombs of Heroic Spirits (Part 4); Chapter 132: The Catacombs of Heroic Spirits (Part 5); Chapter 133: The Catacombs of Heroic Spirits (Part 6); Chapter 134: The Catacombs of Heroic Spirits (Part 7); Chapter 135: The Catacombs of Heroic Spirits (Part 8); Original Short Story: The Mysterious Scream that Reverberated Throughout The Underground Catacombs
19	June 25, 2024	978-4-8240-0872-5	April 9, 2025	978-1-7183-1638-6
Chapter 136: The Catacombs of Heroic Spirits (Part 9); Chapter 137: The Catacombs of Heroic Spirits (Part 10); Chapter 138: The Catacombs of Heroic Spirits (Part 11); Chapter 139: The Catacombs of Heroic Spirits (Part 12); Chapter 140: Holy Lance Eclipse (Part 1); Chapter 141: Holy Lance Eclipse (Part 2); Chapter 142: Holy Lance Eclipse (Part 3); Chapter 143: Holy Lance Eclipse (Part 4); Short Manga: Path of the Heroes; Original Short Story: Even Apostles Want a Girls' Get-together
20	October 25, 2024	978-4-8240-0982-1	July 23, 2025	978-1-7183-1639-3
Chapter 144: Holy Lance Eclipse (Part 5); Chapter 145: Holy Lance Eclipse (Part 6); Chapter 146: Holy Lance Eclipse (Part 7); Chapter 147: Holy Lance Eclipse (Part 8); Chapter 148: Holy Lance Eclipse (Part 9); Chapter 149: Abyssland (Part 1); Chapter 150: Abyssland (Part 2); Chapter 151: Abyssland (Part 3); Original Short Story: Colette's Sisterly Love
21	February 25, 2025	978-4-8240-1102-2	November 5, 2025	978-1-7183-5366-4
Chapter 152: Abyssland (Part 4); Chapter 153: Abyssland (Part 5); Chapter 154: Abyssland (Part 6); Chapter 155: Abyssland (Part 7); Chapter 156: Black Grimoire (Part 1); Chapter 157: Black Grimoire (Part 2); Chapter 158: Black Grimoire (Part 3); Chapter 159: Black Grimoire (Part 4); Original Short Story: Yes, Sir, It's the Gloria Dojo!
22	June 25, 2025	978-4-8240-1236-4	April 8, 2026	978-1-7183-5367-1
Chapter 160: Black Grimoire (Part 5); Chapter 161: Blaze; Chapter 162: Survivor (Part 1); Chapter 163: Survivor (Part 2); Chapter 164: Survivor (Part 3); Chapter 165: To the Evil Deity's Heart (Part 1); Chapter 166: To the Evil Deity's Heart (Part 2); Chapter 167: To the Evil Deity's Heart (Part 3); Original Short Story: Meals Without Efil
23	October 25, 2025	978-4-8240-1392-7	September 16, 2026	978-1-7183-5368-8
24	February 25, 2026	978-4-8240-1546-4	—	—
25	June 20, 2026	978-4-8240-1705-5	—	—
26	October 20, 2026	978-4-8240-1905-9	—	—

=== Anime ===
An anime television series adaptation was announced on February 17, 2022. It is produced by Satelight and directed and scripted by Yoshimasa Hiraike, with Miwa Oshima designing the characters and Michiru and Yuria Miyazono composing the music. It aired from July 9 to September 24, 2022, on Tokyo MX. The opening theme song is "Atamannaka Dead End" (頭ん中DEAD END) by RetBear (unknown Vo:10fu), while the ending theme song is "Wherever" by Minori Suzuki. Crunchyroll has licensed the series, and has begun streaming an English dub starting on July 23, 2022. It also released the series on Blu-ray in August 2023. Medialink has licensed the series in Asian region and streaming on their YouTube channel Ani-One Asia.

==== Episodes ====
No.	Title	Directed by (Note: Information is taken from the ending credits of each episode.)	Written by	Storyboarded by	Original release date
1	"Reincarnated Without Memories"; Transliteration: "Kioku o Nakushita Tenseisha" (Japanese: 記憶を無くした転生者)	Mayo Nozaki	Yoshimasa Hiraike	Yoshimasa Hiraike	July 9, 2022
By the mistake of a god, a young man named Kelvin dies and agrees to be reincarnated into a new world with skills he chooses himself, in exchange for all memories except his name taken. Awakening in the new world, he finds he choose to be a Summoner mage and the Goddess of Reincarnation, Melfina, is now his servant in the form of an interactive game menu. Arriving in the town of Parth he joins the Adventurers Guild as a basic mage, keeping his Summoner skill secret as Melfina explains Summoners are so rare and powerful, kings and nations would start wars to acquire him. He takes a job to slay slime monsters which leads to taming a slime and naming it Clotho, which also gives it a distinct personality. He learns from Melfina that before reincarnating, he made his Summoner class Rank S, the highest possible, making him the most powerful living Summoner, and as he is still only Level 1, he will become even more powerful as his Level increases. His skill also provides a massive boost to his summons as Clotho is now a hundred times stronger. Returning to Parth, he is disturbed to find slavery is common in this world but tries not to think about it and instead rents a room for the night.
2	"Dark Knight"; Transliteration: "Kuro Reikishi" (Japanese: 黒霊騎士)	Yoshitaka Fujimoto	Yoshimasa Hiraike	Royden B Kiyoshi Okuyama (Note: Battle Scene Storyboard (バトルシーンコンテ))	July 16, 2022
Kelvin is quickly promoted to E Rank. D Rank adventurer Cashel, who seeks to humiliate Kelvin, advises him to hunt a monster known as a Blackghost Knight. With his Appraisal skill, Kelvin sees Cashel is titled as a Murderer, so instead of joining him he suggests a contest, Kelvin against Cashel's entire party. Cashel and his criminal party members, Gimul and Raj, plot to murder Kelvin. Kelvin captures Raj while Gimul is captured by Clotho, who has now evolved into a Slime Gluttonia, an almost Demon Lord class monster. Cashel is easily beaten up by Kelvin and confesses to hunting low rank adventurers for experience, so they are arrested. Kelvin locates the Blackghost Knight who already has a personality and a name, Gerard. Gerard is able to explain he was once a human knight, but became a monster after he died. After a short duel to gauge each other's strength Gerard abruptly remembers the kingdom he once served, Alcarl, was destroyed by an elf named Jildora when Alcarl would not help the Lizea Empire destroy the Holy Empire of Deramis. This also caused the death of Gerard's wife and daughter, Betty and Connie, the pain of which kept him tied to the world after he died. The next day, Kelvin supplies a piece of Gerard's armour as proof he completed the job, and combined with Cashel's bounty is promoted directly to Rank B. Gerard joins Clotho and Melfina as Kelvin's newest monster.
3	"A Secret Shared with the Guild, and a Slave Girl"; Transliteration: "Girudo to no Mitsuyaku to Dorei Shōjo" (Japanese: ギルドとの密約と奴隷少女)	Takaaki Ishiyama	Yoshimasa Hiraike	Yoshimasa Hiraike; Takeshi Mori	July 23, 2022
Kelvin meets Guildmaster Leo, who asks if Kelvin came from another world, showing his Appraisal Skill is more powerful than Kelvin's Concealment Skill, so he can see he is a Summoner. Leo admits he knew Cashel was a murderer, but he needed proof as Cashel was a foreign noble, so he is grateful to Kelvin. He also reveals other reincarnations were summoned as the current Heroes of the Deramis Empire to face a Demon Lord, so Leo wants Kelvin to instead focus on the monsters who become more powerful due to the Demon Lord's influence. Kelvin agrees and decides to purchase a female slave, to train and add her to his team. He seeks out the slave he saw on his first day, a beautiful half-elf named Efil who so far has not been sold due to a curse she has that burns those she touches. Purchasing her, he breaks her curse, allowing her to touch people for the first time. Returning to his lodgings, Efil is taken under the wing of his landlady Claire, while Kelvin shows her how to use her previously unspent skill points. Kelvin is unable to sleep at night as he is forced to share his bed with Efil.
4	"Demon"; Transliteration: "Akuma" (Japanese: 悪魔)	Miho Arai	Shingo Nagai	Yoshimasa Hiraike	July 30, 2022
Efil becomes a deadly archer and gains an affinity for fire due to her previous curse. She also befriends Angie, a Guild secretary. Tabura, third prince of Trycen, arrogantly confronts and attempts to grab Angie and Efil, so Kelvin beats up his guards. Tabura admits he came to Parth to hire a rumoured strong adventurer to boost his poor reputation, but Kelvin reveals he is the adventurer and refuses Tabura's offer. Melfina visits the Cathedral of Deramis to impart a prophecy to Oracle Colette, ordering the heroes deal with a threat in the west, and to stay away from Parth. Efil tells Kelvin she has fallen in love with him, but Kelvin resists his desire as she is still a slave and he feels he would be taking advantage. Melfina informs Kelvin the four heroes are weaker than she was expecting as Kelvin has almost surpassed them. Leo sends Kelvin to deal with a demon sealed in a cave. Kelvin finds two demons, the Archdemon Viktor, guarding a demon-girl named Sera, daughter to the most recently defeated Demon Lord Gustav. Viktor hopes by eating Kelvin he will gain the human ability to break the seal keeping Sera trapped. He will then eat Sera and become the next Demon Lord himself. Kelvin begins smiling and Melfina and Gerard reveal to Efil that Kelvin has an unfortunate habit, he is a total battle junkie; the more powerful his opponents, the more excited he becomes.
5	"Daughter of the Demon King"; Transliteration: "Maō no Musume" (Japanese: 魔王の娘)	Tsuyoshi Tobita	Shingo Nagai	Takeshi Mori; Kiyoshi Okuyama	August 6, 2022
Viktor attacks but is weakened by Clotho draining his magic, and his arms are destroyed by Efil's arrows and Gerard's sword. Viktor assumes his full demonic form but against their teamwork he is still defeated. A stone pillar almost falls on Sera, until Viktor saves her. Viktor admits he was never going to eat Sera. In reality, Viktor once trained and took care of Sera when she was young and was assigned to guard her by her father Gustav. Before he was defeated by the Hero, Gustav cast a spell on Sera sealing her away so only a human could unseal her, and Viktor has guarded her ever since. As his dying request, Viktor asks Kelvin to add Sera to his party so she can finally see the world. Kelvin agrees and Viktor dies peacefully. Despite the risk she will become the next Demon King, Kelvin frees Sera and conceals her demon traits. Gerard evolves into an Abyssal Knight Commander. Kelvin reports to Leo and is promoted to Rank A for defeating Viktor. Angie organises a celebration on Kelvin's promotion. After everyone passes out drunk Kelvin finds Sera mourning for Viktor who was her only childhood companion. She decides to experience the entire world in Viktor's memory, in particular, to see the ocean and learn to swim like Viktor once promised her.
6	"Rice and Thieves and Heroes"; Transliteration: "Kome to Tōzoku to Yūsha" (Japanese: コメと盗賊と勇者)	Kazuomi Koga	Mariko Mochizuki	Yoshimasa Hiraike; Takeshi Mori	August 13, 2022
Having tamed Sera, Kelvin crafts her armour from Viktor's armour and also a new sword, Dainsleif, for Gerard. Kelvin has a sudden powerful hunger for rice, so they all travel to the Water Kingdom of Toraj and its capital coastal city where rice can be found and Sera can swim in the ocean. Melfina disappears again, claiming she hopes to possess one of her avatars and finally appear in the physical world. Gerard privately suspects Melfina is jealous Kelvin has two other ladies in his party. On the journey they are attacked by the bandit gang Black Wind who want Sera and Efil for the slave trade. Sera enjoys defeating them before Kelvin interrogates them. Kelvin informs Toraj Guild leader Mist the Black Wind's secret leader is a famous adventurer from Trycen named Christoph who is secretly involved in the illegal slave trade. For political reasons they cannot accuse Christoph publicly, until Kelvin realizes the four heroes are in town. By his suggestion Mist formally requests the heroes look into recent kidnappings by the Black Wind. Kelvin locates and frees slaves captured by Black Wind before easily defeating Christoph and his lieutenants. The heroes eventually catch up but believe Christoph is another adventurer sent to free the slaves and find Kelvin and his team pretending to be the true leaders of Black Wind.
7	"Battle with the Heroes"; Transliteration: "Yūsha-tachi to no Taisen" (Japanese: 勇者たちとの対戦)	Masahiro Takada	Mariko Mochizuki	Mitsuru Sōma	August 20, 2022
Kelvin finally meets the heroes, sword wielders Touya and Setsuna, and mages Nana and Miyabi. Kelvin challenges them to a fight against him, with the losing side having to obey one order from the winner. Beginning the duel Kelvin reveals his new equipment Skill Eater, which are gloves absorbing other people's unique skills and allow Kelvin to use them. Having already borrowed Sera's Martial Combat skill, Kelvin next steals Parallel Processing from Miyabi. Touya tries to fight on his own, believing it is his job if he is to defeat the Demon Lord one day, until Setsuna slaps him for risking himself and ignoring his teammates. Touya apologizes and they fight as a team again. Kelvin thoroughly criticizes their amateur approach and gives them hints on how to improve. The heroes succeed in trapping him in an anti-magic trap, so Kelvin uses Parallel Processing to invent a new spell and frees himself. All four heroes are defeated but when they awaken, Kelvin explains he is the one who rescued the slaves and Christoph is the true criminal. The heroes realize Kelvin only fought them to measure their abilities and help them improve, and thank him. Kelvin reminds them they promised to obey one order, so he demands they strip their clothes.
8	"Returning to Parth and the Goddess Arrives"; Transliteration: "Pāzu e no Kikan to Megami no Kōrin" (Japanese: パーズへの帰還と女神の降臨)	Nozomu Kamiya	Yoshimasa Hiraike	Tatsuo Sato	August 27, 2022
Kelvin changes the heroes into swim clothes and takes them to a sea cave to train against a giant octopus. Kelvin notes they almost lost to the octopus, so they stand no chance against a Dungeon Boss, and the Demon Lord would kill them without effort. Sera locates a Dungeon Boss Dragon. The heroes decide to fight it, which impresses Kelvin with their resolve, so he gives them a break and defeats the dragon himself. The heroes leave so Kelvin gives them necklaces he enchanted himself. Kelvin is summoned by the Queen of Toraj, Tsubaki Fujiwara, and realizes from her castle architecture and her family name, one of her ancestors must have been Japanese. She thanks him for defeating Black Wind and the dragon and is surprised when Kelvin requests only rice, so she rewards him with a lifetimes supply and even teaches Efil Japanese cuisine. Tsubaki attempts to hire Kelvin to work for her personally, but he rejects the offer. In Parth, Kelvin purchases a large house and also hires two of the slaves he freed from Black Wind, Elly and her daughter Luca, as household servants. Melfina returns with her avatar body and Kelvin is able to summon her into the physical world for the first time.
9	"Hero Summoning"; Transliteration: "Yūsha Shōkan" (Japanese: 勇者召喚)	Miho Arai	Mariko Mochizuki	Takeshi Mori	September 3, 2022
Melfina rewards Kelvin with her Grace of Resurrection, which can save him from any fatal attack once a month, and also allows him to summon a hero from Japan, but this can only be used once in his lifetime. This worries Kelvin as it would mean forcing someone to come to this world against their will. He shares his worries with Melfina who explains the Demon Lords all possesses the skill Papiyas, which causes insanity and makes them invulnerable to all damage. Thus the only ones who can kill them are summoned heroes; since they come from other worlds their magic is fundamentally different. Kelvin still feels guilty, so Melfina tells him to only summon people who have already died, so it would feel less like kidnap and more like a second chance. Feeling better, Kelvin decides to reincarnate a hero immediately. Casting the spell, Kelvin summons a young girl named Rio, the strongest hero from all of Japan. Rio, who had been terminally ill in Japan, is grateful to be reincarnated in a healthy body and accepts Kelvin's offer to join his party so she can repay him. As she is the only other person Kelvin has seen with black hair he decides Rio should pose as his younger half-sister. Rio also decides to change her name to Rion.
10	"New Family"; Transliteration: "Arata Naru Kazoku" (Japanese: 新たなる家族)	Mayo Nozaki	Mariko Mochizuki	Takeshi Mori	September 10, 2022
Kelvin awakens and finds Sera, Melfina and Rion have all snuck into his bed. Kelvin decides for their own safety Rion, Elly and Luca should level up, so with his XP sharing skill he increases their levels without them having to fight. He also tames a Shadow-Wolf as a pet for Rion that she names Alex. Uld, another adventurer, joins them in a dungeon with his party who are slaying monsters for their promotion exam to Rank B. Unfortunately, Sera and Gerard already slew all the monsters. Kelvin learns Guildmaster Leo has put him forward for a promotion exam to Rank S. Over several weeks, Rion trains until she is a capable fighter. One night, 14 assassins enter Kelvin's lands and Kelvin lets Rion and Alex fight them as a test. The assassins, former teammates of Christoph, seek revenge against Kelvin but are all defeated by Rion while Kelvin captures their leader. Elsewhere, the Emperor of Trycen is disappointed at Christoph's failure as his exposure is an international embarrassment to Trycen, especially with the kingdoms of Gawn, Toraj and Deramis considering forming an alliance against them. Prince Azgrad and General Tristan vote to go to war immediately, while General Dan and Princess Shutola vote to wait for better conditions in which to start a war. The vote tiebreaker is left to General Clive, who is absent due to indulging his hedonistic appetite.
11	"Rank S Promotion Exam"; Transliteration: "Esu-kyū Shōkaku Shiken" (Japanese: S級昇格試験)	Yukio Takahashi	Shingo Nagai	Takeshi Mori; Kiyoshi Okuyama	September 17, 2022
Leo informs Kelvin that Trycen has been increasing aggression against Gawn kingdom. Coincidentally, he sends Kelvin on his Rank S promotion exam, to complete a job for Leonheart Gawn, Beast-King of Gawn, by slaying a Rank S monster to save an elven village. Elven Chief Nelras mistakes Efil for his own daughter Lumil, but realizes his mistake. Kelvin is curious about Lumil and Nelras explains that Lumil offered herself as sacrifice to save the village from a dragon 20 years prior. The dragon originally took her as his wife, but years later Lumil was found dead and fearing the dragons return, the elves fled to Gawn. Kelvin suspects Lumil was Efil's mother, though her human father remains unknown as pregnancy between the dragon and Lumil would've been impossible. Nelras reveals the monster has been kidnapping elves so Kelvin erects a stone barrier around the village. Trycen soldiers invade with monsters somehow under their command, but are killed by Efil using extremely long range archery magic. Their commander avoids capture by controlling the Rank S monster, a Gigant-Lord. The Gigant is defeated by Rion and Alex, only to transform into a flaming Gigant-Furnace. Rion defeats it again anyway and captures the commander. General Clive appears and almost kills Efil, who is saved by Kelvin. Kelvin realizes Clive is strong and feels his Battle-Junkie instincts rising.
12	"Another Reincarnated"; Transliteration: "Mō Hitori no Tenseisha" (Japanese: もう一人の転生者)	Daisuke Takashima	Shingo Nagai	Takeshi Mori; Kiyoshi Okuyama	September 24, 2022
Clive tries to hypnotize Efil into becoming his sex slave, but Kelvin defends her. He realizes Clive is also a reincarnation with a unique Hypnosis skill. Clive brags his hypnosis lets him do whatever he wants to anybody for his personal amusement. Angered by Clive's arrogance, Kelvin manages to scar his face, infuriating Clive who summons a Rank S hurricane spell. Kelvin is forced to use his most powerful magic staff, the Rank S Black Disaster. He cuts through Clive's spell and severs both Clive's legs. Clive is rescued by General Tristan who teleports them both away. The elves celebrate but Kelvin is disappointed the fight was a draw. Tristan has Clive imprisoned and puts his own sex slaves in charge of torturing him for experimentation, to see if reincarnations have any scientific value. Kelvin decides he must grow his power even further. Nelras gives Efil a hair ornament belonging to Lumil. An elven girl reveals she is actually a disguised Leonheart Gawn and, having seen everything, confirms Kelvin is now promoted to S Rank. There will be an official promotion ceremony which includes a mock battle against existing S Rank adventurers. Everyone is exasperated when the idea of fighting other S Rank warriors ignites Kelvin's battle junkie instincts again.

== Reception ==
As of May 2021, the series has over one million copies in circulation.
