= Ongaku Shōjo =

Japanese anime television series

音楽少女
- Genre: School life
- Created by: Studio Deen; King Records
- Anime film
- Directed by: Kenichi Ishikura
- Produced by: Norimitsu Urasaki
- Written by: Kana Yamada
- Music by: Taishi
- Studio: Studio Deen
- Released: March 22, 2015
- Runtime: 25 minutes
- Anime television series
- Directed by: Yukio Nishimoto
- Written by: Deko Akao
- Music by: Taishi
- Studio: Studio Deen
- Licensed by: Crunchyroll
- Original network: AT-X, Tokyo MX, BS11, Tochigi TV
- English network: SEA: Animax Asia
- Original run: July 6, 2018 – September 21, 2018
- Episodes: 12

Ongaku Shōjo (音楽少女, lit. 'Music Girls') is a 2018 Japanese anime television series about a fictional idol unit, produced by Studio Deen. It spawned from a short film that was produced by Studio Deen for Young Animator Training Project's Anime Mirai 2015. The 12-episode series aired between July 6 and September 21, 2018. A single titled "On Stage Life" was released on June 6, 2018, under the fictional group's name.

== Plot ==
Eccentric girl Hanako Yamadagi returns to Japan from the United States and finds herself enamored by the Music Girls, an obscure eleven member idol unit she discovered performing at the airport. The Music Girls' manager, Ikehashi, takes a shot on Hanako during open auditions hoping that a new member would help revitalize the band. Unfortunately for Ikehashi, while Hanako is good at dancing, she's not good at singing. Instead, Hanako becomes the secretary for the Music Girls, helping them solve various problems behind the scenes.

== Characters ==
Hanako Yamadaki (山田木 はなこ, Yamadagi Hanako)
Voiced by: Seria Fukagawa
Sasame Mitsukuri (箕作 沙々芽, Mitsukuri Sasame)
Voiced by: Karin Takahashi
Miku Nishio (西尾 未来, Nishio Miku)
Voiced by: Miho Okasaki
Hiyo Yukino (雪野 日陽, Yukino Hiyo)
Voiced by: Yūko Ōno
Shupe Gushiken (具志堅 シュープ, Gushiken Shūpu)
Voiced by: Miyuri Shimabukuro
Roro Morooka (諸岡 ろろ, Morooka Roro)
Voiced by: Nako Eguchi
Kotoko Kintoki (金時 琴子, Kintoki Kotoko)
Voiced by: Lynn
Uori Mukae (迎 羽織, Mukae Uori)
Voiced by: Yui Ogura
Kiri Mukae (迎 桐, Mukae Kiri)
Voiced by: Sumire Uesaka
Haru Chitose (千歳 ハル, Chitose Haru)
Voiced by: Manami Numakura
Eri Kumagai (熊谷 絵里, Kumagai Eri)
Voiced by: Asami Seto
Sarasa Ryuō (竜王 更紗, Ryuō Sarasa)
Voiced by: Mai Fuchigami

== Anime ==
The 12-episode anime television series aired between July 6 and September 21, 2018. The series opening theme is "Eien Shonen" (永遠少年, Eternal Boy), performed by Yui Ogura, and the ending theme is "Shining Peace" (シャイニング・ピース), performed by the show's cast as the Music Girls. The series is simulcasted by Crunchyroll. Digital Media Rights' AsianCrush streaming website also simulcasted the series. After the final episode, the series is available on Tubi and Amazon Prime's streaming service and for download on Amazon's website.

No.	Title (Note: All English titles are taken from Crunchyroll.)	Original release date
1	"A One-in-a-Million Idol" "100 Oku-ri ni hitori no aidoru" (100億人に一人のアイドル)	July 6, 2018
2	"Don't Take Idols Lightly!" "Aidoru namen na" (アイドルなめんな)	July 13, 2018
3	"Idols, Heart, Resonance!" "Aidoru kokoro kyōmei" (アイドル心共鳴)	July 20, 2018
4	"Naked Idols!" "Hadaka Aidoru" (はだかのアイドル)	July 27, 2018
5	"An Idol's Recipe" "Aidoru no reshipi" (アイドルのレシピ)	August 3, 2018
6	"Meat and Idols" "Niku to aidoru" (ニクとアイドル)	August 10, 2018
7	"Put Idols' Tears on an Airplane..." "Aidoru no namida wa kami hikōki ni nosete..." (アイドルの涙は紙飛行機に乗せて...)	August 17, 2018
8	"Can't Stop the Idols" (can't stop IDOL)	August 24, 2018
9	"Being an Idol isn't Easy" "Aidoru wa tsurai yo yo" (アイドルはつらいよよ)	August 31, 2018
10	"A Song, A Young Girl, & An Idol" "Uta to shōjo to aidoru" (歌と少女とアイドル)	September 7, 2018
11	"The Ultimate Idol" "Saigo no aidoru" (最後のアイドル)	September 14, 2018
12	"Shining Piece" "Aidoru no ippen (pīsu)" (アイドルの一片（ピース）)	September 21, 2018
