= My Wife Has No Emotion =

Japanese manga series

- First tankōbon volume cover, featuring Mina

僕の妻は感情がない (Boku no Tsuma wa Kanjō ga nai)
- Genre: Romance; Science fiction; Slice of life
- Manga
- Written by: Jirō Sugiura
- Published by: Self-published (webcomic); Media Factory (print)
- English publisher: NA: Seven Seas Entertainment
- Magazine: Monthly Comic Flapper
- Original run: August 5, 2019 – present
- Volumes: 8
- Anime television series
- Directed by: Fumihiro Yoshimura
- Produced by: Shintarou Yoshitake; Kazuo Tsutsui; Takuma Kishida; Masaaki Matsumoto; Hiroshi Kamei; Yuuki Konishi; Yuuko Matsui; Hideo Momota; Atsushi Yoshikawa
- Written by: Mitsutaka Hirota
- Music by: Kanade Sakuma; Hanae Nakamura; Natsumi Tabuchi; Miki Sakurai
- Studio: Tezuka Productions (animation); TMS Entertainment (production) (Note: Under the "Unlimited Produce by TMS" label)
- Licensed by: Crunchyroll (streaming); SEA: Plus Media Networks Asia
- Original network: Tokyo MX, MBS, BS Asahi, CBC, AT-X
- English network: SEA: Aniplus
- Original run: July 2, 2024 – September 17, 2024
- Episodes: 12
- icon

My Wife Has No Emotion (僕の妻は感情がない, Boku no Tsuma wa Kanjō ga nai) is a Japanese manga series written and illustrated by Jirō Sugiura. It was originally published as a webcomic on the author's Pixiv account in March 2019. It later began serialization as a manga published in Media Factory's Monthly Comic Flapper magazine in August 2019. An anime television series adaptation produced by TMS Entertainment and animated by Tezuka Productions, aired from July to September 2024.

== Plot ==
Takuma Kosugi is a single worker who lives alone. Due to being too tired to do any cooking and housework, he buys a domestic robot named Mina. One night, Takuma jokingly tells Mina that she should be his wife. Much to his surprise, she takes the joke seriously and they soon start acting like a married couple. As a result, Takuma and Mina must learn how to navigate their relationship.

== Characters ==
Takuma Kosugi (小杉 拓馬, Kosugi Takuma) / Takuma (タクマ)
Voiced by: Toshiyuki Toyonaga
Mina (ミーナ)
Voiced by: Konomi Inagaki
Akari Kosugi (小杉 あかり, Kosugi Akari)
Voiced by: Yoshino Aoyama
Super Mina (スーパーミーナ, Sūpā Mīna)
Voiced by: Yū Serizawa
Licht Nishionji (西園寺リヒト, Nishionji Rihito)
Voiced by: Risae Matsuda
Mamoru (マモル)
Voiced by: Yuki Wakai
Tomiichi Ōtani (大谷富一, Ōtani Tomiichi)
Voiced by: Shūichirō Umeda

== Media ==
=== Manga ===
Written and illustrated by Jirō Sugiura, My Wife Has No Emotion began publication as a webcomic on the authors's Pixiv account on March 19, 2019. It later began serialization as a manga published in Media Factory's Monthly Comic Flapper magazine on August 5, 2019. Its chapters have been collected in eight tankōbon volumes as of September 2024.

The manga is licensed in English by Seven Seas Entertainment.

On September 2, 2024, Sugiura announced the manga was going on indefinite hiatus due to stress in his personal life.

==== Volumes ====
| No. | Original release date | Original ISBN | English release date | English ISBN |
|---|---|---|---|---|
| 01 | February 22, 2020 | 978-4-04-064342-7 | September 21, 2021 | 978-1-64827-560-9 |
Chapters 1–7
| 02 | October 23, 2020 | 978-4-04-064981-8 | November 16, 2021 | 978-1-64827-567-8 |
Chapters 8–14; Extra Story: "Akari's Girlfriend"
| 03 | June 23, 2021 | 978-4-04-680484-6 | August 22, 2022 | 978-1-63858-200-7 |
Chapters 15–20; Extra Story: "My Roommate Has No Bones"
| 04 | December 23, 2021 | 978-4-04-681041-0 | February 28, 2023 | 978-1-63858-720-0 |
Chapters 21–27; Extra Story: "After the Move"
| 05 | July 23, 2022 | 978-4-04-681456-2 | August 15, 2023 | 978-1-68579-522-1 |
Chapters 28–34; Extra Story: "The Secrets Behind the Mina-chan Who Lives with Takuma-san"
| 06 | March 23, 2023 | 978-4-04-681992-5 | January 16, 2024 | 979-8-88843-110-8 |
Chapters 35–40; Extra Story: "Mamoru's Grand Adventure"
| 07 | October 23, 2023 | 978-4-04-682936-8 | September 17, 2024 | 979-8-89160-496-4 |
Chapters 41–47
| 08 | September 21, 2024 | 978-4-04-683766-0 | May 20, 2025 | 979-8-89373-300-6 |
Chapters 48–53

=== Anime ===
An anime television series adaptation was announced in March 2024. It was animated by Tezuka Productions and directed by Fumihiro Yoshimura, with Mitsutaka Hirota overseeing the series scripts, Zenjirou Ukulele designing the characters, and Kanade Sakuma, Hanae Nakamura, Natsumi Tabuchi, and Miki Sakurai composing the music. The series aired from July 2 to September 17, 2024, on Tokyo MX and other networks. The opening theme song is "Okaerinasai" (おかえりなさい; lit. Welcome Back) performed by VTuber Sora Tokino, while the ending theme song is "Wave" performed by Miisha Shimizu. Crunchyroll streamed the series. Plus Media Networks Asia licensed the series in Southeast Asia and broadcasts it on Aniplus Asia.

==== Episodes ====
| No. | Title | Directed by (Note: Production staff information is taken from the ending credits of each episode) | Written by | Storyboarded by | Original release date (Note: Episodes were released on Abema and Crunchyroll three days before their televised airings.) |
|---|---|---|---|---|---|
| 1 | "An Appliance Became My Wife"; Transliteration: "Kaden ga Tsuma ni Narimashita" (Japanese: 家電が妻になりました) | Fumihiro Yoshimura | Mitsutaka Hirota | Fumihiro Yoshimura | July 2, 2024 |
| 2 | "I Went Outdoors with My Wife"; Transliteration: "Tsuma to Gaishutsu Shimashita" (Japanese: 妻と外出しました) | Takuo Suzuki | Mitsutaka Hirota | Fumihiro Yoshimura | July 9, 2024 |
| 3 | "My Wife Met My Sister"; Transliteration: "Tsuma ga Imōto to Deaimashita" (Japanese: 妻が妹と出会いました) | Yuri Ueda | Mayumi Morita | Fumihiro Yoshimura | July 16, 2024 |
| 4 | "My Wife Changed into a Swimsuit"; Transliteration: "Tsuma ga Mizugi ni Kigaetara" (Japanese: 妻が水着に着替えたら) | Takuo Suzuki | Mitsutaka Hirota | Fumihiro Yoshimura | July 23, 2024 |
| 5 | "A Wife's Kiss Is Powerful"; Transliteration: "Tsuma no Kuchizuke ga Pawafuru Desu" (Japanese: 妻の口づけがパワフルです) | Toshiaki Kanbara | Naoto Iyoku | Daisuke Shimamura | July 30, 2024 |
| 6 | "My Wife Left Me (For Two Weeks)"; Transliteration: "Tsuma ga Deteitteshima Imashita (Ni Shūkan)" (Japanese: 妻が出て行ってしまいました（2週間）) | Takuo Suzuki | Mitsutaka Hirota | Fumihiro Yoshimura | August 6, 2024 |
| 7 | "An Appliance Became My Child"; Transliteration: "Kaden ga Kodomo ni Narimashita" (Japanese: 家電が子供になりました) | Shotaro Kamiyama | Mayumi Morita | Takeshi Mori | August 13, 2024 |
| 8 | "Looks Like My Wife Has a Will of Her Own"; Transliteration: "Tsuma ni Moiji ga aru Mitaidesu" (Japanese: 妻にも意地があるみたいです) | Yuri Ueda | Naoto Iyoku | Daisuke Shimamura | August 20, 2024 |
| 9 | "It Seems My Wife Has a Past"; Transliteration: "Tsuma ni Kako ga aru Yōdesu" (Japanese: 妻に過去があるようです) | Shotaro Kamiyama | Mitsutaka Hirota | Fumihiro Yoshimura | August 27, 2024 |
| 10 | "My Wife and Child Got Lost"; Transliteration: "Tsuma to Kodomo ga Maigo ni Narimashita" (Japanese: 妻と子供が迷子になりました) | Takashi Kamei | Mayumi Morita | Takashi Kamei | September 3, 2024 |
| 11 | "This Is My Wife"; Transliteration: "Boku no Tsuma desu" (Japanese: 僕の妻です) | Takuo Suzuki | Naoto Iyoku | Daisuke Shimamura | September 10, 2024 |
| 12 | "My Wife Is The Best"; Transliteration: "Boku no Tsuma wa Saikōdesu" (Japanese: 僕の妻は最高です) | Fumihiro Yoshimura; Mie Matsushima; Takashi Kamei | Mitsutaka Hirota | Fumihiro Yoshimura | September 17, 2024 |

== Reception ==
The series was nominated for the 6th Next Manga Awards in the print category and was ranked 15th out of 50 nominees. It was also nominated for the same award two years later and was ranked 6th out of 50 nominees.

== See also ==
- The Fake Alchemist, another manga series by Jirō Sugiura
