= Between the Sky and Sea =

Japanese manga series and video game

- Key visual

ソラとウミのアイダ (Sora to Umi no Aida)
- Video game
- Developer: ForwardWorks
- Publisher: ForwardWorks
- Platform: Android, iOS
- Released: JP: September 28, 2017
- Manga
- Written by: Oji Hiroi; ForwardWorks
- Illustrated by: Bekkourico
- Published by: ASCII Media Works
- Magazine: Dengeki Daioh
- Original run: September 27, 2017 – November 27, 2018
- Volumes: 2
- Anime television series
- Directed by: Atsushi Nigorikawa
- Written by: Takashi Yamada
- Music by: Asami Tachibana
- Studio: TMS/Double Eagle
- Licensed by: NA: Sentai Filmworks
- Original network: Tokyo MX, Sun TV, AT-X, BS11, BS Fuji, RCC
- Original run: October 4, 2018 – December 20, 2018
- Episodes: 12

Between the Sky and Sea (Japanese: ソラとウミのアイダ, Hepburn: Sora to Umi no Aida; lit. "The Space Between the Sky and Sea") is a Japanese media franchise created by Oji Hiroi and owned by ForwardWorks, at the time a subsidiary of Sony Interactive Entertainment. It primarily consists of a smartphone game, released for Android and iOS on September 28, 2017. A Microsoft Windows version by DMM was originally announced to be released in Q2 2018, but was ultimately never launched. The game's service ended on May 7, 2019. An anime television series adaptation by TMS Entertainment aired from October 4 to December 20, 2018. Sentai Filmworks have licensed the series.

== Characters ==
Haru Soramachi (空町 春, Soramachi Haru)
Voiced by: Karin Takahashi
A 17-year-old girl from Tokyo who went to the city of Onomichi to pursue her dream of becoming a space fisherman. She is very fond of her grandmother, who had raised her as her parents had separated when she was young, as well as cute things such as cats.
Namino Murakami (村上 波乃, Murakami Namino)
Voiced by: Rika Tachibana
A 17-year-old girl from Onomichi who is the most experienced of the group. She initially dislikes Haru due to Haru failing in her first fishing mission. Her favorite food is pancakes. She is descended from the Murakami Navy, a 16th-century navy of seafaring pirates who were active in the Seto Inland Sea.
Ruby Azumi (ルビー・安曇, Rubī Azumi)
Voiced by: Honoka Inoue
A 16-year-old Japanese-American kikokushijo girl from California who joins the group after saving them when a training session went wrong. She calls herself a "spy" and came to Japan in order to find out about Japan's space fishing technology.
Maiko Sakura (櫻 舞湖, Sakura Maiko)
Voiced by: Momoko Suzuki
A 17-year-old girl from Akita Prefecture who has a shy personality. It is revealed that she decided to become a space fisherman in order to find information on her older brother, who had disappeared in a fishing expedition years before. She is also initially afraid of water due to an incident during her childhood, but later overcomes this fear.
Makiko Maki (薪 真紀子, Maki Makiko)
Voiced by: Maori Komeno
A 17-year-old girl from Kumamoto Prefecture who joined the group at the same time as Haru. She is fond of outdoor activities such as cycling. She also used to date older men as a result of her father, who works in the Ministry of Agriculture, Forestry and Fisheries, frequently being away from home. It is later revealed that her father had covered up the disappearance of Maiko's brother during the first space fishing expedition.
Makoto Mitsurugi (美剣 真, Mitsurugi Makoto)
Voiced by: Ai Kōsaka
A 16-year-old girl from Kyoto who is descended from a line of swordsmiths. She decided to become a space fisherman despite having a fear of water because she wanted to prove her abilities to her family.

== Media ==
=== Manga ===
A manga adaptation was serialized by ASCII Media Works in their Dengeki Daioh magazine between September 2017 and November 2018. The series was compiled into two tankōbon volumes.

| No. | Release date | ISBN |
|---|---|---|
| 1 | April 27, 2018 | 978-4-04-893806-8 |
| 2 | December 25, 2018 | 978-4-04-912049-3 |

=== Anime ===
An anime television series adaptation was announced on July 25, 2017. Atsushi Nigorikawa directed the anime at TMS Entertainment, and Takashi Yamada is in charge of series composition. Shūhei Yamamoto drawn the character designs. The series aired from October 4 to December 20, 2018, on Tokyo MX and other channels. (Note: Tokyo MX lists the show at 24:00 on October 3, which is at October 4, 2018 at 12:00 a.m.) The opening theme is "Sora to Umi no Aida" (ソラとウミのアイダ) by Karin Takahashi, Honoka Inoue, and Momoko Suzuki under their character names, and the ending theme is "Ao no Kanata" (蒼の彼方, lit. 'Beyond the Blue') by Konomi Suzuki. The series ran for 12 episodes. Crunchyroll streamed the series, while Sentai Filmworks have licensed the series.

| No. | Title (Note: All English titles are taken from Crunchyroll.) | Original release date |
|---|---|---|
| 1 | "Gonna Fish in Space!" "Uchū de sakana o totchau zo!" (Japanese: 宇宙でサカナをとっちゃうぞ！) | October 4, 2018 |
| 2 | "The Girls Squad Gathers!" "Joshi-bu shūgou!" (Japanese: 女子部シューゴウ！) | October 11, 2018 |
| 3 | "Ruby's a Spy, Okay?!" "Rubī, supai dakara na!" (Japanese: ルビー、スパイだからな！) | October 18, 2018 |
| 4 | "Shall We All Hit the Beach?" "Min'na de umi ni ikimasen ka?" (Japanese: みんなでウミにいきませんか?) | October 25, 2018 |
| 5 | "Give Me Strength!" "Boku ni Chikara o!" (Japanese: ボクにチカラを！) | November 1, 2018 |
| 6 | "Ramume, Secrets, and Brothers" "Ramune to Himitsu to Oni-chan" (Japanese: ラムネと秘密とお兄ちゃん) | November 8, 2018 |
| 7 | "I'm the Leader!" "Rīda wa, watashi!" (Japanese: リーダは、わたし！) | November 15, 2018 |
| 8 | "Between Haru and Namino" "Haru to Namino no Aida" (Japanese: 春と波乃のアイダ) | November 22, 2018 |
| 9 | "A Super Fun Summer Break in Yukatas!" "Yukata de raku shī natsu yasumi!" (Japanese: 浴衣でラクしい夏休み！) | November 29, 2018 |
| 10 | "Records and Remembrance" "Kioku to Kiroku" (Japanese: キオクとキロク) | December 6, 2018 |
| 11 | "Take to the Skies with a Smile!" "Egao de sora e!" (Japanese: 笑顔でソラへ！) | December 13, 2018 |
| 12 | "Between the Sky and Sea" "Sora to Umi no Aida" (Japanese: ソラとウミのアイダ) | December 20, 2018 |
