= Honoka Inoue =

Japanese voice actress and singer

- 井上 ほの花
- Born: February 9, 1998 (age 28); Kanagawa Prefecture, Japan
- Other name: Honoka
- Occupations: Voice actress; singer
- Years active: 2015–present
- Agent: Office Anemone
- Mother: Kikuko Inoue

Honoka Inoue (井上 ほの花, Inoue Honoka; born February 9, 1998) is a Japanese voice actress and singer from Kanagawa Prefecture who is affiliated with Office Anemone. She is the daughter of voice actress Kikuko Inoue. She debuted as a singer in 2015, and she began her voice acting career in 2016, appearing as minor characters in the anime series Danganronpa 3: The End of Hope's Peak High School and Maho Girls PreCure!. She released her first mini-album First Flight in 2016, and her first single "Sparkling Chinatown" in 2017.

== Career ==
Inoue was born in Kanagawa Prefecture on February 9, 1998. She is the daughter of voice actress Kikuko Inoue.

In 2015, Inoue began her career in entertainment as a singer, performing the song "Koi Maboroshi (Love Fantasy)" (恋幻想(Love Fantasy)) under the mononym Honoka; the song was used in the video game Taiko no Tatsujin. She then made her voice acting debut in 2016 after becoming affiliated with Office Anemone, the same agency as her mother. Her first voice acting roles were in the anime series Danganronpa 3: The End of Hope's Peak High School and Maho Girls PreCure!. Later that year, she would release her first mini-album First Flight, and she performed the songs "Netemonetemo" (ネテモネテモ) and "Sekai wa Itsu Demo Mystery" (世界はいつでもミステリー, Sekai wa itsu demo misuterī) for Taiko no Tatsujin.

In 2016, Inoue provided the voice for the live action anime Japanese film Shimajiro in Bookland.

In 2017, Inoue and her mother appeared as a daughter and mother in the original net animation Pokémon Generations. She also appeared in the anime series WorldEnd as Phyracorlybia Dorio and In Another World With My Smartphone as Alma. That same year, she was cast as the character Ruby Azumi in the mobile game Between the Sky and Sea. She released her first single "Sparkling Chinatown" on June 28, 2017.

In 2018, Inoue played the role of Sakura Uzuki in the anime series Pazudora. She will also reprise the role of Ruby for the anime series adaptation of Between the Sky and Sea.

In 2021, it was announced that Inoue would be the voice actress for Nanami Asari in The Idolmaster franchise, who appears in two mobile games The Idolmaster Cinderella Girls and The Idolmaster Cinderella Girls: Starlight Stage. This role involves publishing CDs under the character's name as well as appearing in concerts.

In 2025, Inoue played the role of Kaoruko Waguri in the anime series The Fragrant Flower Blooms with Dignity.

== Filmography ==
=== Anime series ===
Year	Title	Role	Notes
2016	Danganronpa 3: The End of Hope's Peak High School	Karen Kisaragi	
2016	Maho Girls Precure!	Female Student	
2017	Tsuki ga Kirei	Sakura Tanaka	
2017	Tsugumomo	Tamami Tadata	
2017	The Laughing Salesman New	Yume Mamano	
2017	WorldEnd	Phyracorlybia Dorio	
2017	Pokémon Generations	Daughter	
2017	In Another World With My Smartphone	Alma	
2018	Katana Maidens ~ Toji No Miko	Sanae Iwakura	
2018	Pazudora	Sakura Uzuki	
2018	Asobi Asobase	Student Council President	
2018	Between the Sky and Sea	Ruby Azumi	
2018	Merc Storia	Princess Sarodia	
2019	Hachigatsu no Cinderella Nine	Tomoe Kawakita	
2021	Edens Zero	Xiaomei	
2022	Slow Loop	Aiko Ninomiya	
2022	Ninjala	Gumchi	
2022	RPG Real Estate	Kotone Kazairo	
2022	In the Heart of Kunoichi Tsubaki	Tanpopo	
2023	Record of Ragnarok II	Hlökk	
2024	'Tis Time for "Torture," Princess	Inki	
2024	Duel Masters Lost: Tsuioku no Suishō	Crysta	
2025	Anne Shirley	Anne Shirley	
2025	The Fragrant Flower Blooms with Dignity	Kaoruko Waguri	
2025	Puniru Is a Cute Slime	Maika Kirara	Season 2
2025	Wandance	Miru Ōmori	
2026	Roll Over and Die	Y'lla Jelicin	
2026	A Misanthrope Teaches a Class for Demi-Humans	Mirai Haruna	
2026	The World's Strongest Witch	Erna	
2026	Nia Liston: The Merciless Maiden	Nia Liston	
2026	Magical Girl Raising Project: Restart	Pechka	
TBA	Rebuild World	Sheryl	

=== Anime films ===
Year	Title	Role	Notes
2016	Shimajiro in Bookland	Voice	
2023	Rakudai Majo: Fūka to Yami no Majo	Fūka	

=== ONA ===
Year	Title	Role	Notes
2024	Duel Masters Lost: Tsuioku no Suishō	Crysta	

=== Video games ===
Year	Title	Role	Notes	Source
2016	Puyo Puyo Chronicle	Ally	Nintendo 3DS	
2021	The Idolmaster Cinderella Girls and The Idolmaster Cinderella Girls: Starlight Stage	Nanami Asari	iOS, Android	
2021	Arknights	Honeyberry	iOS, Android	
2022	Azur Lane	Emden	iOS, Android	
2022	Umamusume: Pretty Derby	Aston Machan	iOS, Android	
2023	Crymachina	Hayat		
2023	Brown Dust 2	Refithea	iOS, Android, Windows	
2026	Fate/Grand Order	Flora	iOS, Android	
2026	Nekopara: Sekai Connect	Marmelo	iOS, Android	
2026	Kantai Collection	Vautour, Visby	Web, Android	

=== Dubbing ===
- The 100, Madi Griffin (Lola Flanery)
- Annabelle: Creation, Janice (Talitha Bateman)
- Don't Breathe 2, Phoenix (Madelyn Grace)
- Dora and the Lost City of Gold, Dora (Isabela Moner)
- Resident Evil: Welcome to Raccoon City, Sherry Birkin (Holly de Barros)

=== Stage play ===
- Fate Grand Order THE DRAMALOGUE-Avalon le Fae (Nameless Fairy)
