= Thank You for Taking Care of Our Boy Banri =

Japanese manga series

- First tankōbon volume cover

ウチの万李がお世話になります (Uchi no Banri ga Osewa ni Narimasu)
- Genre: Romantic comedy
- Manga
- Written by: Chitose Kaido
- Published by: Hakusensha
- English publisher: NA: Yen Press
- Imprint: Hana to Yume Comics
- Magazine: LaLa
- Original run: February 24, 2024 – present
- Volumes: 6

Thank You for Taking Care of Our Boy Banri (Japanese: ウチの万李がお世話になります, Hepburn: Uchi no Banri ga Osewa ni Narimasu) is a Japanese manga series written and illustrated by Chitose Kaido. It was originally published as one-shot in Hakusensha's shōjo manga magazine LaLa in September 2023. It later began serialization in the same magazine in February 2024.

== Synopsis ==
Nanase has just been given an offer to be a temporary manager of her favorite idol, Banri Narita, by her older sister. Nanase accepts and is initially excited to work with Banri, until she sees his true nature. Feeling like quitting, Nanase catches a glimpse of Banri performing, and suddenly changes her mind.

== Characters ==
Banri Narita (成田万李, Narita Banri)
Voiced by: Yuma Uchida (PV)

== Media ==
=== Manga ===
Written and illustrated by Chitose Kaido, Thank You for Taking Care of Our Boy Banri was originally published as a one-shot in Hakusensha's shōjo manga magazine LaLa on September 22, 2023. It later began serialization in the same magazine on February 24, 2024. Its chapters have been compiled into six tankōbon volumes as of November 2026.

In December 2025, Yen Press announced that they had licensed the series for English publication beginning in June 2026.

| No. | Original release date | Original ISBN | North American release date | North American ISBN |
|---|---|---|---|---|
| 1 | July 5, 2024 | 978-4-592-23031-1 | June 23, 2026 | 979-8-8554-1817-0 |
Chapters 0–3
| 2 | January 4, 2025 | 978-4-592-23050-2 | April 27, 2027 | 979-8-8554-2752-3 |
| 3 | July 4, 2025 | 978-4-592-23079-3 | — | — |
| 4 | January 5, 2026 | 978-4-592-23111-0 | — | — |
| 5 | June 5, 2026 | 978-4-592-23136-3 | — | — |
| 6 | November 5, 2026 | 978-4-592-23174-5 | — | — |

=== Other ===
In commemoration of the release of the series' second volume, a voice comic promotional video was uploaded to Hakusensha's Hakusen Anime Channel on January 4, 2025. The video featured vocal performances from Yuma Uchida as Banri Narita.

== Reception ==
The series was ranked fourth in the Nationwide Publishers Recommended Comics of 2025 list. The series was nominated for the twelfth Next Manga Award in 2026 in the print category.
