= He Was My Brother (manga) =

Japanese manga series

- Cover of the first digital volume

兄だったモノ (Ani Datta Mono)
- Genre: Horror; Mystery; Romance
- Manga
- Written by: Minoru Matsuda
- Published by: Comic Smart (digital); Ichijinsha (print)
- English publisher: NA: Mangamo (digital) Yen Press
- Magazine: Ganma!
- Original run: May 27, 2021 – November 20, 2025
- Volumes: 10

He Was My Brother (Japanese: 兄だったモノ, Hepburn: Ani Datta Mono) is a Japanese manga series written and illustrated by Minoru Matsuda. It began serialization on Comic Smart's Ganma! manga service from May 2021 to November 2025.

== Synopsis ==
After the death of her brother, Kanoko visits his grave with Hijiri, her brother's lover and her current love interest. As she attempts to deepen her relationship with Hijiri, a ghost appears around him trying to prevent Kanoko from getting closer. Kanoko believes the ghost is her brother clinging on to his feelings for Hijiri.

== Media ==
=== Manga ===
Written and illustrated by Minoru Matsuda, He Was My Brother was serialized on Comic Smart's Ganma! manga service from May 27, 2021, to November 20, 2025. Its chapters were collected into ten ebook volumes released from December 15, 2021, to July 1, 2026. Ichijinsha released the first two volumes in print on April 25, 2023.

During their panel at Anime Expo 2023, Mangamo announced that they had licensed the series and added it to their platform. In May 2026, Yen Press announced that they had licensed the series for English publication, with the first volume set to release in November 2026.

| No. | Original release date | Original ISBN | English release date | English ISBN |
|---|---|---|---|---|
| 1 | December 15, 2021 (ebook); April 25, 2023 (print) | 978-4-7580-3877-5 | November 24, 2026 | 979-8-8554-4291-5 |
| 2 | September 1, 2022 (ebook); April 25, 2023 (print) | 978-4-7580-3878-2 | March 23, 2027 | 979-8-8554-4297-7 |
| 3 | April 25, 2023 (ebook) | — | — | — |
| 4 | October 1, 2023 (ebook) | — | — | — |
| 5 | April 1, 2024 (ebook) | — | — | — |
| 6 | October 1, 2024 (ebook) | — | — | — |
| 7 | May 1, 2025 (ebook) | — | — | — |
| 8 | September 1, 2025 (ebook) | — | — | — |
| 9 | December 1, 2025 (ebook) | — | — | — |
| 10 | July 1, 2026 (ebook) | — | — | — |

=== Other ===
A promotional video featuring music from Caronz Bekaluz was uploaded to the Ganma! YouTube channel on April 12, 2023.

== Reception ==
The series was nominated for the eighth and ninth Next Manga Awards in the web category in 2022 and 2023 respectively.
