= Me and My Beast Boss =

Japanese manga series

- Second tankōbon volume cover

獣上司に実は認められていた話 (Kemono Jōshi ni Jitsuwa Mitome Rareteita Hanashi)
- Genre: Fantasy; Romance
- Manga
- Written by: Shiroinu
- Published by: Enterbrain
- English publisher: NA: Yen Press
- Imprint: B's Log Comics
- Magazine: B's Log Cheek
- Original run: April 28, 2021 – present
- Volumes: 4

Me and My Beast Boss (獣上司に実は認められていた話, Kemono Jōshi ni Jitsuwa Mitome Rareteita Hanashi) is a Japanese manga series written and illustrated by Shiroinu. It was originally published as webcomic on the author's Twitter account in September 2020. It was later acquired by Enterbrain who began serializing it on the Pixiv Comic website under their B's Log Cheek brand in April 2021.

== Plot ==
The series is set in a world where beastmen have superiority over humans. The protagonist, Saki Oki, goes through seemingly endless discrimination at her work place from her beastmen superiors and coworkers. When she's called to the office of the company president, Atlas, she initially believes that she would get fired, only for Atlas to reward her with a promotion to become his private secretary.

== Characters ==
Saki Oki (沖咲, Oki Saki)
Voiced by: Yūko Kaida (PV)
Atlas (アトラス, Atorasu)
Voiced by: Satoshi Hino (PV)

== Media ==
=== Manga ===
Written and illustrated by Shiroinu, Me and My Beast Boss was originally published as a webcomic on the author's Twitter account on September 18, 2020. It was later acquired by Enterbrain who began serializing it on the Pixiv Comic website under their B's Log Cheek brand on April 28, 2021. Its chapters have been collected into four tankōbon volumes as of January 2025.

During their panel at Anime NYC 2022, Yen Press announced that they had licensed the series for English publication.

No.	Original release date	Original ISBN	North American release date	North American ISBN
1	December 27, 2021	978-4-04-736879-8	May 23, 2023	978-1-9753-6123-5
Chapters 1–8; Bonus
2	November 1, 2022	978-4-04-737245-0	October 31, 2023	978-1-9753-7395-5
Chapters 10–15; Bonus: "First Meeting: Atlas' Side"; Bonus: "Birthday"
3	November 1, 2023	978-4-04-737666-3	September 17, 2024	978-1-9753-9872-9
Chapters 16–22; Chapter 18.5: "A Small Change"; Bonus: "Memories"
4	January 31, 2025	978-4-04-738283-1	March 24, 2026	979-8-8554-2610-6
Chapters 23–29; Bonus: "Chemistry"; Bonus: "Year-End Special Story"

=== Other ===
A promotional video commemorating the release of the first volume was uploaded to the Kadokawa YouTube channel on December 27, 2021. It featured the voices of Satoshi Hino and Yūko Kaida.

== Reception ==
The series was nominated for the eighth Next Manga Awards in the web category.
