= Almark =

Japanese light novel series

- First light novel volume cover

アルマーク (Arumāku)
- Genre: Classical fantasy
- Novel series
- Written by: Noboru Yamada
- Published by: Shōsetsuka ni Narō
- Original run: October 19, 2019 – present
- Light novel
- Written by: Noboru Yamada
- Illustrated by: Posuka Demizu
- Published by: Media Factory
- English publisher: NA: Yen Press
- Imprint: MF Books
- Original run: August 25, 2022 – present
- Volumes: 5
- Manga
- Written by: Noboru Yamada
- Illustrated by: Hiyoto Yunoki
- Published by: Media Factory
- English publisher: NA: Yen Press
- Imprint: MF Comics
- Magazine: KadoComi
- Original run: July 25, 2022 – present
- Volumes: 8

Almark (アルマーク, Arumāku) is a Japanese light novel series written by Noboru Yamada and illustrated by Posuka Demizu. It began serialization on Shōsetsuka ni Narō in October 2019. It was later acquired by Media Factory who began publishing it under their MF Books imprint in August 2022. A manga adaptation illustrated by Hiyoto Yunoki began serialization on Kadokawa's KadoComi manga website in July 2022.

== Synopsis ==
The series focuses on Almark, the son of a northern mercenary. Having an aptitude for magic, Almark, similar to his father, becomes a mercenary at a young age. Despite that, his father wished for Almark to become a magician. So Almark heads to the south, where magicians are commonplace, and enrolls at the Norkh Institute for Magic in order to follow his father's wish.

== Characters ==
Almark (アルマーク, Arumāku)
Voiced by: Nobunaga Shimazaki (PV)

== Media ==
=== Light novel ===
Written by Noboru Yamada, Almark began serialization on Shōsetsuka ni Narō on October 19, 2019. It was later acquired by Media Factory who began publishing it with illustrations by Posuka Demizu under their MF Books light novel imprint on August 25, 2022. Five volumes (including two released digital-only) have been released as of April 24, 2026.

In February 2025, Yen Press announced that they had licensed the series for English publication.

No.	Title	Original release date	North American release date
1	The Institute for Magic 魔法学院入学編	August 25, 2022; 978-4-04-681088-5	August 12, 2025; 979-8-8554-1864-4
Prologue; Chapter 1; Chapter 2; Side Story
2	The Northern Assassin 北からの暗殺者編	August 25, 2022; 978-4-04-681089-2	April 14, 2026; 979-8-8554-1866-8
Prologue; Chapter 1; Chapter 2; Chapter 3; Side Story
3	The Dark Ruins 闇の遺跡編	July 25, 2023; 978-4-04-682558-2	January 12, 2027; 979-8-8554-1868-2
Prologue; Chapter 1; Chapter 2; Chapter 3; Side Story
4	— 武術大会編	September 25, 2025	—
Prologue; Chapter 1; Chapter 2; Chapter 3; Side Story
5	— 新たなる仲間編	April 24, 2026	—

=== Manga ===
A manga adaptation illustrated by Hiyoto Yunoki began serialization on Kadokawa's KadoComi manga website on July 25, 2022. The manga's chapters have been compiled into eight tankōbon volumes as of October 2026.

In February 2025, Yen Press announced that they had licensed the manga adaptation for English publication.

No.	Title	Original release date	North American release date
1	"Almark, become someone who truly matters."	January 23, 2023; 978-4-04-682070-9	July 22, 2025; 979-8-8554-1061-7
1. "Mercenaries of the North"; 2. "Norkh Institute for Magic"; 3. "Zeid's Tour"; 4. "A Morning's Resolve"
2	"Welcome, Almark!"	July 22, 2023; 978-4-04-682494-3	February 24, 2026; 979-8-8554-1063-1
5. "First Magic"; 6. "Equality"; 7. "Oath"; 8. "Part of the Class"; 9. "Magic Flute and Shadow"
3	"That day, I took an oath and staked the very name of House Shifei!"	January 23, 2024; 978-4-04-683210-8	July 28, 2026; 979-8-8554-1065-5
10. "Seeking Monsters"; 11. "To Each Their Own Role"; 12. "The Garden Whispers"; 13. "Summer Plans"; 14. "The First Exam"
4	—	September 21, 2024; 978-4-04-684035-6	April 27, 2027; 979-8-8554-2831-5
5	—	March 22, 2025; 978-4-04-684609-9	—
6	—	September 22, 2025; 978-4-04-685196-3	—
7	—	April 23, 2026; 978-4-04-685767-5	—
8	—	October 23, 2026; 978-4-04-660738-6	—

=== Other ===
In commemoration of the release of the manga's first volume, a promotional video was released on January 23, 2023. The video features a voice performance from Nobunaga Shimazaki.
