= Chef in the Demon King's Castle =

Japanese manga series

- Chef in the Demon King's Castle: Despite All the Scary-Hot Demons, This Is a Great Workplace
- First tankōbon volume cover

魔王城の料理番 〜コワモテ魔族ばかりだけど、ホワイトな職場です〜 (Maōjō no Ryōriban: Kowamote Mazoku Bakaridakedo, Howaito na Shokuba Desu)
- Genre: Cooking; Isekai; Romantic comedy
- Manga
- Written by: YMK
- Published by: Shinchosha
- English publisher: NA: Yen Press
- Imprint: Bunch Comics
- Magazine: Kurage Bunch
- Original run: February 21, 2023 – present
- Volumes: 6

Chef in the Demon King's Castle: Despite All the Scary-Hot Demons, This Is a Great Workplace (魔王城の料理番 〜コワモテ魔族ばかりだけど、ホワイトな職場です〜, Maōjō no Ryōriban: Kowamote Mazoku Bakaridakedo, Howaito na Shokuba Desu) is a Japanese manga series written and illustrated by YMK. It began serialization on Shinchosha's Kurage Bunch manga website in February 2023.

== Synopsis ==
On the brink of death due to a myriad of unfortunate events that culminated in her being homeless, Tsumugi is summoned to another world into the Demon King's castle and starts working as a chef in his kitchen. While working, she fights for her place while refusing to give in to her demon colleagues' intimidation.

== Characters ==
Tsumugi (ツムギ)
Voiced by: Miyu Tomita (audio drama)
Salt (ゾルト, Zoruto)
Voiced by: Junichi Suwabe (audio drama)
Sugar (シューガ, Shūga)
Voiced by: Yūki Ono (audio drama)
Yun (ユン)
Voiced by: Kengo Kawanishi (audio drama)
Vee (ヴィー, Vī)
Voiced by: Takuya Eguchi (audio drama)
Vinegar (ビネガル, Binegaru)
Voiced by: Yuichi Nakamura (audio drama)

== Media ==
=== Manga ===
Written and illustrated by YMK, Chef in the Demon King's Castle: Despite All the Scary-Hot Demons, This Is a Great Workplace began serialization on Shinchosha's Kurage Bunch manga website on February 21, 2023. Its chapters have been compiled into six tankōbon volumes as of August 2026.

In September 2026, Yen Press announced that it had licensed the series for English publication.

No.	Original release date	Original ISBN	English release date	English ISBN
1	July 7, 2023	978-4-10-772615-5	March 23, 2027	979-8-85-543084-4
2	February 8, 2024	978-4-10-772679-7	—	—
3	August 7, 2024	978-4-10-772736-7	—	—
4	May 9, 2025	978-4-10-772826-5	—	—
5	December 9, 2025	978-4-10-772893-7	—	—
6	August 7, 2026	978-4-10-772970-5	—	—

=== Other ===
An audio drama adaptation was included in Animate's limited edition release of the third volume on August 7, 2024. The audio drama consisted of performances from Miyu Tomita, Junichi Suwabe, Yūki Ono, Kengo Kawanishi, Takuya Eguchi and Yuichi Nakamura.

In commemoration of the series reaching 1 million copies in circulation, a promotional video was uploaded to the Bunch Manga YouTube channel on June 19, 2026. The video featured performances from Tomita and Suwabe reprising their roles from the audio drama.

== Reception ==
The series was ranked 10th in the Web Manga General Election 2023. The series was nominated for the tenth Next Manga Awards in the web category.

By June 2026, the series had over 1 million copies in circulation.
