= Magic Doctor Rex's Perverted Medical Record =

Japanese manga series

- First tankōbon volume cover

魔法医レクスの変態カルテ (Mahōi Rekusu no Hentai Karute)
- Genre: Erotic comedy; Fantasy comedy; Medical
- Manga
- Written by: Daisuke Motomi
- Published by: Shinchosha
- English publisher: NA: Yen Press
- Imprint: Bunch Comics
- Magazine: Kurage Bunch
- Original run: December 15, 2023 – present
- Volumes: 5

Magic Doctor Rex's Perverted Medical Record (魔法医レクスの変態カルテ, Mahōi Rekusu no Hentai Karute) is a Japanese manga series written and illustrated by Daisuke Motomi. It began serialization on Shinchosha's Kurage Bunch manga website in December 2023.

== Synopsis ==
The series is set in a world where the Demon King has been defeated. Rex runs a clinic in this world and he oversees patients of all kinds with myriads of issues, especially those of a sexual nature.

== Characters ==
Rex Landiel (レクス・ランディエル, Rekusu Randieru)
Voiced by: Jouji Nakata (PV)
Velma (ベルマ, Beruma)
Voiced by: Yū Kobayashi (PV)

== Media ==
=== Manga ===
Written and illustrated by Daisuke Motomi, Magic Doctor Rex's Perverted Medical Record began serialization on Shinchosha's Kurage Bunch manga website on December 15, 2023. Its chapters have been collected in five tankōbon volumes as of July 2026.

In January 2026, Yen Press announced that they had licensed the series for English publication, with the first volume set to release in July later in the year.

No.	Original release date	Original ISBN	North American release date	North American ISBN
1	March 8, 2024	978-4-10-772686-5	July 28, 2026	979-8-8554-2176-7
1. "Slime"; 2. "Interspecies Love"; 3. "Man-Eaters"; 4. "Incubus"; 5. "Bikini Armor"; 6. "Boonrunes and Goonrunes"; Bonus: Case 2.5: "A Cure for Premature Ejaculation"
2	September 9, 2024	978-4-10-772744-2	—	—
3	April 9, 2025	978-4-10-772812-8	—	—
4	January 8, 2026	978-4-10-772902-6	—	—
5	July 9, 2026	978-4-10-772961-3	—	—

=== Other ===
In commemoration of the release of the third volume, a promotional video was uploaded to Shinchosha's Comic Bunch YouTube channel on April 9, 2025. It featured vocal performances from Jouji Nakata and Yū Kobayashi.

== Reception ==
The series topped Niconico's 1st Manga General Election in the "Pink" Category in 2024.
