= Liste Rouge =

Japanese manga series

- First tankōbon volume cover

リストルージュ (Risuto Rūju)
- Genre: Dystopian, fantasy
- Manga
- Written by: Hoku Tomose
- Published by: Akita Shoten
- English publisher: NA: Yen Press
- Imprint: Princess Comics Bonita
- Magazine: Mystery Bonita
- Original run: April 6, 2024 – present
- Volumes: 5

Liste Rouge (リストルージュ, Risuto Rūju) is a Japanese manga series written and illustrated by Hoku Tomose. It was originally published as a one-shot on the author's Twitter account in November 2023. The one-shot was later published in Akita Shoten's shōjo manga magazine Mystery Bonita in February 2024. It later began serialization in the same magazine in April that same year.

== Synopsis ==
The series is set in a world where humans are regarded as endangered species by the Chimeras, a humanoid species that has a mixture of features from different animals. It focuses on the relationship between a protective Chimera boy, Juli, and a human girl, Meria.

== Publication ==
Written and illustrated by Hoku Tomose, Liste Rouge was originally published as a one-shot on the author's Twitter account on November 8, 2023. The one-shot was later published in Akita Shoten's shōjo manga magazine Mystery Bonita on February 6, 2024. It later began serialization in the same magazine on April 6, 2024. Its chapters have been compiled into five tankōbon volumes as of September 2026.

In January 2026, Yen Press announced that they had licensed the series for English publication, with the first volume set to release in July later in the year.

No.	Original release date	Original ISBN	North American release date	North American ISBN
1	August 16, 2024	978-4-253-26611-6	July 28, 2026	979-8-8554-3066-0
0. "Mira and Karen"; 1. "Juli and Meria"; 2. "A Big Mess"; 3. "The Show Must Go On"
2	February 14, 2025	978-4-253-26612-3	November 24, 2026	979-8-8554-3845-1
3	August 18, 2025	978-4-253-26613-0	—	—
4	March 16, 2026	978-4-253-01233-1	—	—
5	September 15, 2026	978-4-253-01962-0	—	—

== Reception ==
The series has been recommended by manga artist Hiroyuki Asada.
