= To Sir, Without Love: I'm Divorcing You =

Japanese light novel series

- First light novel volume cover

拝啓見知らぬ旦那様、離婚していただきます (Haikei Mishiranu Danna-sama, Rikonshite Itadakimasu)
- Genre: Fantasy; Romance
- Novel series
- Written by: Kori Hisakawa
- Published by: Kakuyomu
- Original run: April 12, 2020 – December 26, 2020
- Light novel
- Written by: Kori Hisakawa
- Illustrated by: Airumu
- Published by: ASCII Media Works
- English publisher: NA: Yen Press
- Imprint: Media Works Bunko
- Original run: January 25, 2022 – present
- Volumes: 6 (Note: Ten light novels in total have been released including the second part of volumes 1 and 2, and the second and third parts of volume 5) + 1
- Manga
- Written by: Kori Hisakawa
- Illustrated by: Iroto Tsumugi
- Published by: Kadokawa Shoten
- English publisher: NA: Kadokawa Yen Press
- Imprint: Flos Comic
- Magazine: Comic CMoa
- Original run: July 5, 2023 – present
- Volumes: 6

To Sir, Without Love: I'm Divorcing You (拝啓見知らぬ旦那様、離婚していただきます, Haikei Mishiranu Danna-sama, Rikonshite Itadakimasu) is a Japanese light novel series written by Kori Hisakawa and illustrated by Airumu. It was originally serialized on Kadokawa's Kakuyomu website between April and December 2020. It was later acquired by ASCII Media Works who began publishing it under their Media Works Bunko imprint in January 2022. A manga adaptation illustrated by Iroto Tsumugi began serialization on NTT Solmare's Comic CMoa website under the Flos Comic brand in July 2023.

== Plot ==
After eight years of an arranged marriage, Byletta's husband Arnald Swangan returned after a war that was as long as his marriage to Byletta. Byletta later hands in a request to Arnald demanding a divorce, then Arnald proposes a wager that if they sleep together for a month and she doesn't conceive, he'll agree to the divorce.

== Characters ==
Byletta (バイレッタ, Bairetta)
Voiced by: Natsumi Hioka (voice comic)
Arnald Swangan (アナルド・スワンガン, Anarudo Suwangan)
Voiced by: Atsushi Abe (voice comic)

== Media ==
=== Light novel ===
Written by Kori Hisakawa, To Sir, Without Love: I'm Divorcing You was initially serialized on Kadokawa's Kakuyomu website between April 12 and December 26, 2020. It was later acquired by ASCII Media Works who began publishing it with illustrations by Airumu under their Media Works Bunko light novel imprint on January 25, 2022. Six volumes with four separated parts have been released as of June 25, 2026.

On February 7, 2025, Yen Press announced that they also licensed the novels, with the first part of the first volume releasing in July.

No.	Original release date	Original ISBN	English release date	English ISBN
1	January 25, 2022	978-4-04-914171-9	July 8, 2025	979-8-8554-1188-1
Prologue: "A Letter from a Stranger of a Wife"; Chapter 1: "A Wager and a Wedding Night Come Eight Years Late"; Chapter 2: "An Estate Inspection and a Husband's Intentions"; Special chapter: "A Wicked Wife's True Form"; Chapter 3: "Trust and Betrayal"; Epilogue: "The Foxhunt Begins"
1.5	February 25, 2022	978-4-04-914172-6	March 10, 2026	979-8-8554-1190-4
Chapter 4: "A New Quandary and a Wager's End"; Special chapter: "The Leader of the Coup d'Etat"; Chapter 5: "A Husband's Unseen Heart"; Chapter 6: "You, Whom I Despise"; Epilogue: "A Letter from My Beloved Wife"
2	November 24, 2022	978-4-04-914642-4	September 8, 2026	979-8-8554-1192-8
Prologue: "A Letter from a Beloved Wife"; Chapter 1: "Disquieting Rumors"; Chapter 2: "A Troublesome Visitor and the White Reaper"; Special chapter: "Having Fun with One's Wife"; Chapter 3: "A New Title"; Prologue Revisited: "Orders from Above and a Beloved Wife's Affair"
2.5	July 24, 2023	978-4-04-914643-1	January 12, 2027	979-8-8554-1194-2
3	November 25, 2023	978-4-04-915304-0	—	—
4	June 25, 2024	978-4-04-915740-6	—	—
5	December 25, 2024	978-4-04-916139-7	—	—
5.25	February 25, 2025	978-4-04-916140-3	—	—
5.5	June 25, 2025	978-4-04-916141-0	—	—
SP	January 25, 2026	978-4-04-916845-7	—	—
6	June 25, 2026	978-4-04-952266-2	—	—
7	December 25, 2026	978-4-04-952519-9	—	—

=== Manga ===
A manga adaptation illustrated by Iroto Tsumugi began serialization on NTT Solmare's Comic CMoa website under Kadokawa's Flos Comic brand on July 5, 2023. The manga's chapters have been compiled into six tankōbon volumes as of May 2026.

The manga adaptation is published digitally in English on Kadokawa's BookWalker website. During their panel at New York Comic Con 2024, Yen Press announced that they had licensed the series for English publication with the first volume set to release in April 2025.

No.	Original release date	Original ISBN	North American release date	North American ISBN
1	December 5, 2023	978-4-04-682539-1	April 29, 2025	979-8-8554-1725-8
1. "A Letter from a Wife He's Never Met"; 2. "Her Husband's Return"; 3. "A Wedding Night Eight Years in the Making"; 4. "The Marriage Contract"; 5. "The Land Inspection" Part 1; A Note: "Newfound Feelings"
2	June 5, 2024	978-4-04-683615-1	September 23, 2025	979-8-8554-1909-2
6. "The Land Inspection" Part 2; 7. "The Land Inspection" Part 3; 8. "The Ruffian's Identity"; 9. "The Truth Behind His Wicked Wife"; 10. "A Day-Long Date"; 10.5. "After the Date"
3	December 5, 2024	978-4-04-684127-8	April 28, 2026	979-8-8554-2319-8
11. "Reunion With a Bitter Enemy"; 12. "His First Time"; 13. "The Foxhunt Commences"; 14. "A New Problem on the Estate"; 15. "A Narisian Courtship"; 16. "A Nameless Feeling"
4	June 5, 2025	978-4-04-684802-4	March 23, 2027	979-8-8554-3833-8
5	December 5, 2025	978-4-04-685410-0	—	—
6	May 2, 2026	978-4-04-660042-4	—	—
7	December 17, 2026	978-4-04-660729-4	—	—

=== Other ===
An audiobook version of the first volume with narration by Makoto Furukawa was released on the ListenGo service on August 24, 2022.

A voice comic adaptation was uploaded to the Comic Station YouTube channel on July 5, 2023. The voice comic featured performances from Natsumi Hioka and Atsushi Abe.

== Reception ==
The series won the Grand Prize in the Romance category in the 6th Kakuyomu Web Novel Contest in 2021. The manga adaptation won the Grand Prize at the 2025 Digital Comic Awards.

By June 2026, the series had over 2 million copies in circulation.
