= If the Villainess and Villain Met and Fell in Love =

Japanese light novel series

- First light novel volume cover

悪役令嬢と悪役令息が、出逢って恋に落ちたなら ～名無しの精霊と契約して追い出された令嬢は、今日も令息と競い合っているようです～ (Akuyaku Reijō to Akuyaku Reisoku ga, Deatte Koi ni Ochitanara: Nanashi no Seirei to Keiyaku Shite Oidasareta Reijō wa, Kyō mo Reisoku to Kisoiatte Iru Yō Desu)
- Genre: Romantic fantasy
- Novel series
- Written by: Harunadon
- Published by: Shōsetsuka ni Narō
- Original run: July 13, 2021 – March 2, 2022
- Light novel
- Written by: Harunadon
- Illustrated by: Yomi Sarachi
- Published by: SB Creative
- English publisher: NA: Yen Press
- Imprint: GA Novel
- Original run: December 15, 2021 – March 15, 2025
- Volumes: 6
- Manga
- Written by: Harunadon
- Illustrated by: Chiru Ukai
- Published by: SB Creative
- English publisher: NA: Yen Press
- Imprint: GA Comic
- Magazine: Piccoma
- Original run: September 9, 2022 – present
- Volumes: 7
- icon

If the Villainess and Villain Met and Fell in Love (悪役令嬢と悪役令息が、出逢って恋に落ちたなら ～名無しの精霊と契約して追い出された令嬢は、今日も令息と競い合っているようです～, Akuyaku Reijō to Akuyaku Reisoku ga, Deatte Koi no Ochitanara: Nanashi no Seirei to Keiyaku Shite Oidasareta Reijō wa, Kyō mo Reisoku to Kisoiatte Iru Yō Desu) is a Japanese light novel series written by Harunadon and illustrated by Yomi Sarachi. It was originally published on the user-generated novel publishing website Shōsetsuka ni Narō from July 2021 to March 2022. It was later acquired by SB Creative who published six volumes under their GA Novel imprint from December 2021 to March 2025. A manga adaptation illustrated by Chiru Ukai began serialization on the Piccoma website under SB Creative's GA Comic brand in September 2022.

== Synopsis ==
Brigitte Meidell is the outcast of her family, due to being contracted to an unknown spirit as a child. She later has her engagement to the third prince Joseph called off, and it brings her to despair. She gets no sympathy from anyone until she meets a young man named Yuri Aurealis, who is praised as a genius and is contracted to two high-ranking spirits. The two initially do not get along with each other, but grow to admire each other.

== Media ==
=== Light novel ===
Written by Harunadon, If the Villainess and Villain Met and Fell in Love was originally serialized on the user-generated novel publishing website Shōsetsuka ni Narō from July 13, 2021, to March 2, 2022. It was later acquired by SB Creative who published six volumes with illustrations by Yomi Sarachi under their GA Novel light novel imprint from December 15, 2021, to March 15, 2025. The series is licensed in English by Yen Press.

No.	Original release date	Original ISBN	North American release date	North American ISBN
1	December 15, 2021	978-4-8156-1348-8	October 17, 2023	978-1-9753-7593-5
1. "The Flame of Love Burns Out"; 2. "A Chance Encounter Between Birds of a Feather"; 3. "Tempestuous Tests"; 4. "Brigitte's Slumbering Power"; 5. "She Falls"; 6. "The Long-Suffering Attendants?"; 7. "The Magic-Stone Hunt"; 8. "People Who Believe in Me"; Original short story: "A Place to Come Home to"
2	April 15, 2022	978-4-8156-1349-5	February 20, 2024	978-1-9753-7907-0
1. "The Water Clan"; 2. "A Small Guest"; 3. "Brigitte's Spirit"; 4. "Magical Beginnings"; 5. "Prince Charming"; 6. "A Love Close By"; 7. "The Spirit Awakens"; 8. "The Words She Never Heard"; Exclusive story: "A Day in the Life of Peep"
3	August 10, 2023	978-4-8156-2140-7	January 21, 2025	979-8-8554-0205-6
1. "The Founding Festival Approaches"; 2. "The Day of the Shrine Visit"; 3. "The Missing Mother"; 4. "Older Sister and Younger Brother"; 5. "Even If We Never Agree"; 6. "The Parade Begins"; 7. "The Night of the Ball"; 8. "Longed-For Words"; Bonus story: "Blue Treasure"
4	March 15, 2024	978-4-8156-2437-8	December 9, 2025	979-8-8554-0652-8
1. "The Graduation Exam Nears"; 2. "Unseeable Intentions"; 3. "The World of the Crack"; 4. "The Unseelie Trap"; 5. "Because You Were Here"; 6. "Distorted Emotions"; 7. "Fallen in Love"; 8. "A Bad Omen"; Bonus story: "It Kept Building Up..."
5	September 14, 2024	978-4-8156-2438-5	August 11, 2026	979-8-8554-2229-0
1. "Where Brigitte Went"; 2. "A Darkness Within the Shrine"; 3. "Their Own Individual Battles"; 4. "An Uncharacteristic Temperature"; 5. "A Yearned-For Reunion"; 6. "An Undesired Reunion"; 7. "A Saintly Wedding"; 8. "Returning Home"; Bonus story: "The Four Brothers of the Water Clan"
6	March 15, 2025	978-4-8156-2782-9	January 12, 2027	979-8-8554-3516-0

=== Manga ===
A manga adaptation illustrated by Chiru Ukai began serialization on the Piccoma website under SB Creative's GA Comic brand on September 9, 2022. The manga's chapters have been collected into seven tankōbon volumes as of May 2026. The manga adaptation is also licensed in English by Yen Press.

No.	Original release date	Original ISBN	North American release date	North American ISBN
1	February 15, 2023	978-4-8156-1426-3	February 20, 2024	978-1-9753-7994-0
Chapters 1–5; Bonus: "Who's Being Toyed With?"
2	August 10, 2023	978-4-8156-1808-7	November 26, 2024	979-8-8554-0203-2
Chapters 6–10; Bonus: "Lunch with Ariel"
3	March 15, 2024	978-4-8156-2253-4	April 22, 2025	979-8-8554-1335-9
Chapters 11–15
4	September 15, 2024	978-4-8156-2254-1	September 23, 2025	979-8-8554-1823-1
Chapters 16–20; Bonus: "Little Cutie"
5	March 15, 2025	978-4-8156-2494-1	April 28, 2026	979-8-8554-2742-4
Chapters 21–25; Bonus: "Steeped in Sincerity"
6	September 15, 2025	978-4-8156-2495-8	—	—
7	May 15, 2026	978-4-8156-3438-4	—	—

== See also ==
- Even a Replica Can Fall in Love, another light novel series with the same writer
