= I Want a Gal Gamer to Praise Me =

Japanese manga series

- First tankōbon volume cover

ギャルゲーマーに褒められたい (Gyaru Gēmā ni Homeraretai)
- Genre: Romantic comedy
- Manga
- Written by: Geshumaro
- Published by: Kadokawa Shoten
- English publisher: NA: Yen Press
- Imprint: Kadokawa Comics A
- Magazine: Comic Newtype; (November 19, 2021–present)
- Original run: December 16, 2020 – present
- Volumes: 5

I Want a Gal Gamer to Praise Me (ギャルゲーマーに褒められたい, Gyaru Gēmā ni Homeraretai) is a Japanese manga series written and illustrated by Geshumaro. It initially began serialization on the author's Twitter account in December 2020. It was later acquired by Kadokawa Shoten who began serializing it on their Comic Newtype website in November 2021.

== Synopsis ==
The series is centered around Raito Sasaki, a high schooler who plays FPS games. Sasaki seeks help to improve on his skills, and recruits the services of Rion Suzuki, a gyaru who is also a skilled FPS player. Sasaki is impressed by Rion's skills, but is deeply concerned with Rion's closeness to him while he's playing.

== Characters ==
Raito Sasaki (笹木雷斗, Sasaki Raito)
Voiced by: Kengo Kawanishi (voice comic)
A shut-in high school student who wants to be a top FPS gamer.
Rion Suzuki (鈴木莉音, Suzuki Rion)
Voiced by: Ayaka Ōhashi (voice comic)
A gyaru who is a skilled FPS player. She volunteers to be Sasaki's coach. Later on, she begins to develop feelings for him.
Yuu Kunioka (国岡悠, Kunioka Yū)
Voiced by: Maaya Uchida (voice comic)
Raito's tomboyish childhood friend who seeks Raito's affection.

== Media ==
=== Manga ===
Written and illustrated by Geshumaro, I Want a Gal Gamer to Praise Me initially began serialization on the author's Twitter account on December 16, 2020. It was later acquired by Kadokawa Shoten who began serializing it on their Comic Newtype website on November 19, 2021. Its chapters have been collected into five tankōbon volumes as of June 2025.

During their panel at New York Comic Con 2023, Yen Press announced that they licensed the series for English publication.

No.	Original release date	Original ISBN	North American release date	North American ISBN
1	January 8, 2022	978-4-04-111905-1	March 19, 2024	978-1-9753-8020-5
Chapters 1–20; Original chapters 1–4
2	September 9, 2022	978-4-04-112695-0	July 30, 2024	978-1-9753-8022-9
Chapters 21–29; Original chapters 1–6; Bonus
3	June 9, 2023	978-4-04-113833-5	November 19, 2024	978-1-9753-9462-2
Chapters 30–36; Original chapters 1–5; Bonus
4	May 10, 2024	978-4-04-115093-1	April 22, 2025	979-8-8554-1496-7
Chapters 37–44; Original chapters 1–5
5	June 10, 2025	978-4-04-116323-8	January 26, 2027	979-8-8554-3366-1

=== Other ===
In commemoration of the release of the first volume, a voice comic adaptation was uploaded on the Kadokawa YouTube channel on January 8, 2022. The voice comic featured the voices of Kengo Kawanishi and Ayaka Ōhashi. In commemoration of the release of the third volume, another voice comic was uploaded to the same channel on June 16, 2023. Kawanishi and Ōhashi reprised their roles in the voice comic and also featured Maaya Uchida.

== Reception ==
The series was nominated for the eighth Next Manga Awards in the web category.
