= The Color of the End: Mission in the Apocalypse =

Japanese manga series

- First tankōbon volume cover

ウスズミの果て (Usuzumi no Hate)
- Genre: Post-apocalyptic
- Manga
- Written by: Haruo Iwamune
- Published by: Enterbrain
- English publisher: NA: Yen Press
- Imprint: Harta Comix
- Magazine: Harta
- Original run: March 15, 2022 – present
- Volumes: 5
- icon

The Color of the End: Mission in the Apocalypse (Japanese: ウスズミの果て, Hepburn: Usuzumi no Hate) is a Japanese manga series written and illustrated by Haruo Iwamune. It began serialization in Enterbrain's seinen manga magazine Harta in March 2022.

== Synopsis ==
Humanity has been wiped out due to an alien invasion, and inhaling the toxic fumes emitted from the aliens causes a mysterious disease that quickly leads to death. A young researcher named Saya, tasked with protecting the survivors and cleansing the land of the disease, combs the desert ruins of cities in search of the remnants of humanity.

== Publication ==
Written and illustrated by Haruo Iwamune, The Color of the End: Mission in the Apocalypse began serialization in Enterbrain's seinen manga magazine Harta on March 15, 2022. Its chapters have been collected into five tankōbon volumes as of April 2026. In August 2024, Yen Press announced that they had licensed the series for English publication beginning in January 2025.

No.	Original release date	Original ISBN	North American release date	North American ISBN
1	April 14, 2023	978-4-04-737455-3	January 21, 2025	978-1-9753-9722-7
1. "The Silent City"; 2. "The Day of the Ceremony"; 3. "Cinema"; 4. "Manor"; 5. "Moving"; 6. "Shelter"; 7. "Museum I"; 8. "Museum II"; Archives
2	September 15, 2023	978-4-04-737461-4	June 24, 2025	979-8-8554-0688-7
9. "Library"; 10. "Ethan"; 11. "Encounter"; 12. "Siblings"; 13. "Until We Meet Again"; 14. "Old World Military Archives"; 15. ""Aqua-Line Metro; Archives
3	July 12, 2024	978-4-04-737953-4	November 25, 2025	979-8-8554-1839-2
16. "Clock Tower I"; 17. "Clock Tower II"; 18. "Henrietta"; 19. "Sunflowers"; 20. "Worker Unit"; 21. "Unit Production Plant"; 22. "Assault"; 23. "Ark"; 24. "Omen"; Archives
4	May 15, 2025	978-4-04-738377-7	August 25, 2026	979-8-8554-3529-0
25. "Hans"; 26. "Job"; 27. "Hinomi's Clock Shop"; 28. "Central Control Tower"; 29. "Gravestone"; 30. "Giant Shadow"; 31. "Survivors"; 32. "Authenticity"; Archives
5	April 15, 2026	978-4-04-500054-6	—	—
33. "Proof"; 34. "Saya"; 35. "Nani"; 36. "Towako"; 37. "The Meaning Of Mourning"; 38. "On The Same Path"; 39. "Shelter Storage Room"; 40. "The Wedding"; Archives
6	December 15, 2026	978-4-04-500254-0	—	—

=== Chapters not yet released in tankōbon format ===
41. "Intercity Link Road"
42. "Sudden Assault"
43. "Surface Observation Base No. 22"

== Reception ==
The series was ranked sixth in the 2024 edition of Takarajimasha's Kono Manga ga Sugoi! guidebook for the best manga for male readers. MyAnimeList users recommended the series for its unique story and art as part of their 2024 manga recommendations list.
