= Chewed Flesh, Ground Bones =

Japanese manga series

- First tankōbon volume cover

ニクバミホネギシミ (Nikubami Honegishimi)
- Genre: Horror
- Manga
- Written by: Paregoric
- Published by: Shinchosha
- English publisher: NA: Yen Press
- Imprint: Bunch Comics
- Magazine: Kurage Bunch
- Original run: November 7, 2023 – present
- Volumes: 5

Chewed Flesh, Ground Bones (ニクバミホネギシミ, Nikubami Honegishimi) is a Japanese manga series written and illustrated by Paregoric. It began serialization on Shinchosha's Kurage Bunch manga website in November 2023.

== Synopsis ==
Set in 1999, the year Nostradamus predicted that the world would end, there has been a rise in the appearance of the occult in Japan. Inubosaki, an editor for magazine dealing with the paranormal, and Asama, a camerawoman with psychic abilities, team up to cover incidents featuring the occult. 24 years later, a man claiming to be Inubosaki's nephew reaches out to Asama asking for his whereabouts.

== Publication ==
Written and illustrated by Paregoric, Chewed Flesh, Ground Bones began serialization on Shinchosha's Kurage Bunch manga website on November 7, 2023. Its chapters have been collected in five tankōbon volumes as of May 2026.

In September 2026, Yen Press announced that it had licensed the series for English publication.

No.	Original release date	Original ISBN	North American release date	North American ISBN
1	April 9, 2024	978-4-10-772699-5	March 23, 2027	979-8-85-543094-3
2	October 8, 2024	978-4-10-772754-1	—	—
3	March 7, 2025	978-4-10-772802-9	—	—
4	October 9, 2025	978-4-10-772877-7	—	—
5	May 9, 2026	978-4-10-772938-5	—	—
6	December 9, 2026	978-4-10-773007-7	—	—

== Reception ==
The series has been recommended by manga artist Shuhei Miyazaki and comedian Kenji Yamauchi.

The series was nominated for the tenth and eleventh Next Manga Awards in the web category in 2024 and 2025.
