= Days on Fes =

Japanese manga series

- First tankōbon volume cover

デイズ・オン・フェス (Deizu On Fesu)
- Genre: Comedy
- Manga
- Written by: Kanato Oka
- Published by: Kadokawa Shoten
- English publisher: NA: Yen Press
- Imprint: Kadokawa Comics A
- Magazine: Comic Newtype
- Original run: September 25, 2018 – July 7, 2020
- Volumes: 5

Days on Fes (デイズ・オン・フェス, Deizu On Fesu) is a Japanese manga series written and illustrated by Kanato Oka. It was serialized on Kadokawa Shoten's Comic Newtype website from September 2018 to July 2020, with its chapters compiled into five volumes released.

== Synopsis ==
Kanade Sora was invited by her friend Otoha to a music festival, with the promise that her favorite band would perform. Kanade has never attended a music festival before, but as she enjoys her time at this festival, she begins to develop an interest in attending more.

== Publication ==
Written and illustrated by Kanato Oka, Days on Fes was serialized on Kadokawa Shoten's Comic Newtype website from September 25, 2018, to July 7, 2020. Its chapters were compiled into five tankōbon volumes released from April 10, 2019 to September 10, 2020. The series is licensed in English by Yen Press.

No.	Original release date	Original ISBN	North American release date	North American ISBN
1	April 10, 2019	978-4-04-108100-6	February 23, 2021	978-1-97-531961-8
Fes 1–5; Fes 1.5–5.5; Special chapters 1–2
2	June 10, 2019	978-4-04-108102-0	July 13, 2021	978-1-97-531963-2
Fes 6–9; Fes 6.5–9.5; Special chapters 3–4
3	December 10, 2019	978-4-04-108923-1	September 28, 2021	978-1-97-531965-6
Fes 10–13; Fes 10.5–13.5; Side story
4	September 10, 2020	978-4-04-109642-0	February 8, 2022	978-1-97-533977-7
Fes 14–18; Fes 14.5–18.5; Special chapters 5–7
5	September 10, 2020	978-4-04-109643-7	April 26, 2022	978-1-97-534001-8
Fes 19–22; Fes 19.5–22.5; Encore

== Reception ==
The series topped the 2020 Web Manga General Election poll.
