= Rich Johnson (publishing executive) =

American businessman

Rich Johnson is a publishing executive notable for his contributions in the field of graphic novels.

Johnson is a former Vice President of Book Trade Sales at DC Comics who has been credited with popularizing the graphic novel genre in mainstream bookstores and libraries. Under his watch DC Comics had their first New York Times Bestseller with Neil Gaiman’s The Sandman: Endless Nights. He also co-founded and was Co-Publishing Director for Yen Press and co-founded the magazine Yen Plus.

In 2011, he was a judge for the comic industry's highest award - The Eisner Awards.

From July 2016 to May 2019, he was Vice-President of Sales, Marketing and Business Development at Lion Forge Comics. In 2022, he was appointed Vice-President of Sales & Business Development at Diamond Book Distributors, the book trade division of Diamond Comic Distributors.

He has previously been a publishing consultant and packager as well as the writer of "Graphic Details" – a column that appears on the industry site comicsbeat.com.

From 2022 to 2025, he wrote several books for Universe Publishing celebrating the history of various Marvel Comics characters: Captain America, Spider-Man, The Hulk, and The Avengers.

He is also the author of the graphic memoir My Father's Eyes.
