= I'm That Monster Girl You Once Helped Out =

Japanese manga series

- I'm That Monster Girl You Once Helped Out: A Middle-Aged Teacher Finds Unexpected Popularity in Another World
- First tankōbon volume cover

「あのとき助けていただいたモンスター娘です。」異世界おっさん教師 突然のモテ期に困惑する ("Ano Toki Tasukete Itadaita Monsutā Musume Desu." Isekai Ossan Kyōshi Totsuzen no Moteki ni Konwaku Suru)
- Genre: Isekai; Romantic comedy
- Manga
- Written by: Okinosuke
- Published by: Comic Smart (digital); Ichijinsha (print)
- English publisher: NA: Mangamo (digital) Yen Press
- Magazine: Ganma!
- Original run: September 28, 2023 – present
- Volumes: 5

I'm That Monster Girl You Once Helped Out: A Middle-Aged Teacher Finds Unexpected Popularity in Another World (「あのとき助けていただいたモンスター娘です。」異世界おっさん教師 突然のモテ期に困惑する, "Ano Toki Tasukete Itadaita Monsutā Musume Desu." Isekai Ossan Kyōshi Totsuzen no Moteki ni Konwaku Suru) is a Japanese manga series written and illustrated by Okinosuke. It began serialization on Comic Smart's Ganma! manga website in September 2023.

== Synopsis ==
Twenty years ago, Washio was summoned to another world to become a hero. However, Washio found the role to be ill-fitting, and later decided to become a teacher. In the current day, Washio still works as a teacher, but gets no respect from his students or his fellow teachers, until one day, a busty girl with tentacles named Claudia comes in and reminds Washio that he saved her some time ago when she was younger.

== Publication ==
Written and illustrated by Okinosuke, I'm That Monster Girl You Once Helped Out: A Middle-Aged Teacher Finds Unexpected Popularity in Another World began serialization on Comic Smart's Ganma! manga website on September 28, 2023. Ichijinsha has compiled its chapters into five tankōbon volumes as of October 2026.

During their panel at Anime NYC 2025, Mangamo announced that they had licensed the series for English digital publication. In June 2026, Yen Press announced that they had licensed the series, under the title I'm the Monster Girl You Once Saved: A Middle-Aged Teacher in Another World Is Concerned About His Sudden Popularity, for English publication, with the first volume set to release in December 2026.

No.	Original release date	Original ISBN	English release date	English ISBN
1	January 24, 2025	978-4-7580-2842-4	December 15, 2026	979-8-8554-4293-9
2	July 10, 2025	978-4-7580-2928-5	—	—
3	January 15, 2026	978-4-7580-8914-2	—	—
4	June 25, 2026	978-4-7580-9950-9	—	—
5	October 23, 2026	978-4-8251-0171-5	—	—

== Reception ==
The series was nominated for the eleventh Next Manga Awards in 2025 in the web category.
