= My Oh My, Atami-kun =

Japanese manga series

- First tankōbon volume cover

いやはや熱海くん (Iyahaya, Atami-kun)
- Genre: Yaoi
- Manga
- Written by: Asa Tanuma
- Published by: Enterbrain
- English publisher: NA: Yen Press
- Imprint: Harta Comix
- Magazine: Harta
- Original run: April 15, 2022 – present
- Volumes: 6
- icon

My Oh My, Atami-kun (Japanese: いやはや熱海くん, Hepburn: Iyahaya, Atami-kun) is a Japanese manga series written and illustrated by Asa Tanuma. It began serialization in Enterbrain's Harta magazine in April 2022.

== Synopsis ==
Atami is a student who attracts the attention of the girls in his school due to his attractive looks and personality. Whenever a girl goes to him with the intent of entering a relationship, he turns down their requests to go out, due to the fact that he is attracted to an upperclassman named Adachi.

== Publication ==
Written and illustrated by Asa Tanuma, My Oh My, Atami-kun began serialization in Enterbrain's Harta magazine on April 15, 2022. Its chapters have been collected into six tankōbon volumes as of November 2026. The series is licensed by Yen Press for English publication.

| No. | Original release date | Original ISBN | North American release date | North American ISBN |
|---|---|---|---|---|
| 1 | January 14, 2023 | 978-4-04-737337-2 | July 23, 2024 | 978-1-9753-9263-5 |
1. "In Love, Curry Is a Hair Whorl"; 2. "Board Games, for Your Son, Around the Clock"; 3. "At a Knight's Jump, on Exhibit and Fielding Practice"; 4. "Haircuts Are the Rainy Season and a Maze"; 5. "At the Library, a Florist and Sighs"; 6. "Senpai Is a Wrist's Reverse Side"; 7. "Summer Vacation Is Curry Buns and Word Chains"; Bonus: "One Lunch Break"
| 2 | October 14, 2023 | 978-4-04-737472-0 | April 22, 2025 | 979-8-8554-0690-0 |
8. "Dinner Is a Middle School's Firstborn Son"; 9. "A Bookstore's Fireworks and Box"; 10. "Pears, in Mandarin Oranges, Are Blue Cards"; 11. "Oats Are an Obligation's Dango"; 12. "School Festival Is Folded Up and Helpful"; 13. "Art Room and the Number of Stars Is Ramune"; 14. "Sweet Red-Bean Soup Is Birthdays and the Open Sea"; 15. "Crabs Are Tycoon and the New Year"; Bonus: "Tsuji-kun's Day Off"
| 3 | August 9, 2024 | 978-4-04-737955-8 | September 23, 2025 | 979-8-8554-1921-4 |
16. "Firecrackers Are Unnatural and Self-Suggestion"; 17. "Anonymous and Arsonist Is a Valentine"; 18. "Bass and Financial Difficulties Make Fate"; 19. "Tomato's Number of Steps Are a Graduation Ceremony"; 20. "Bookstore for a Twenty Minute Cherry Blossom Viewing"; 21. "Career Paths Are a Sound Argument's Glance"; 22. "New School Year's Temple and Crossword"; 23. "Possibilites Are Also a Walking Speed's Room"; Bonus: "Oomori-san After the Incident"
| 4 | June 13, 2025 | 978-4-04-738382-1 | October 27, 2026 | 979-8-8554-3527-6 |
24. "Contrarian and Sukiyaki Are Many-Sided"; 25. "Class Duty's Height and Waterfalls"; 26. "Fan Club's Heart and Special Thanks"; 27. "Rules Are Hourglass's Ice Cream Too"; 28. "Living Spirit Makes Library Energy"; 29. "True-to-Life Japanese Omelets Are a Common Bluebattle"; 30. "A Cold Makes Dash's Ski Masks"; Bonus: "Special Thanks"
| 5 | May 15, 2026 | 978-4-04-500058-4 | — | — |
| 6 | November 13, 2026 | 978-4-04-500255-7 | — | — |

== Reception ==
The series won the 2nd Late Night Manga Award hosted by Bungeishunjū's Crea magazine in 2023. It was also ranked third in the 2024 edition of Takarajimasha's Kono Manga ga Sugoi! guidebook list of the best manga for female readers. The series was also ranked eighteenth in Freestyle Magazine's "The Best Manga 2024" ranking in 2023.
