= Don't Confuse Me, Yamori-kun =

Japanese manga series

- First tankōbon volume cover

まどわせないで矢守くん (Madowasenaide Yamori-kun)
- Genre: Coming-of-age; Drama
- Manga
- Written by: Shina Inoguchi
- Published by: Akita Shoten
- English publisher: NA: Yen Press
- Imprint: Young Champion Comics
- Magazine: Young Champion Web
- Original run: December 27, 2023 – present
- Volumes: 5

Don't Confuse Me, Yamori-kun (まどわせないで矢守くん, Madowasenaide Yamori-kun) is a Japanese manga series written and illustrated by Shina Inoguchi. It began serialization on Akita Shoten's Young Champion Web manga website in December 2023.

== Synopsis ==
Mori and Yamori are two students who decided that after the summer break they would return to school with a new look. Mori returns with a haircut and pierced ears, while Yamori returns growing his hair out and wearing a schoolgirl uniform. Yamori's new look and flirtatious advances towards Mori catches him off-guard.

== Publication ==
Written and illustrated by Shina Inoguchi, Don't Confuse Me, Yamori-kun began serialization on Akita Shoten's Young Champion Web manga website on December 27, 2023. Its chapters have been compiled into five tankōbon volumes as of October 2026.

In February 2026, Yen Press announced that they had licensed the manga for English publication, with the first volume set to release in August later in the year.

No.	Original release date	Original ISBN	English release date	English ISBN
1	July 19, 2024	978-4-253-30308-8	August 25, 2026	979-8-8554-2373-0
1. "Mori-kun and Yamori-kun"; 2. "Yamori-kun, It's Showing?"; 3. "Yamori-kun Wants a Job"; 4. "Yamori-kun and Usami-san"; 5. "Yamori-kun Wants to Have Fun"; 6. "Yamori-kun Wants to Hear It"; 7. "Yamori-kun Is Cute"; Bonus
2	January 20, 2025	978-4-253-30309-5	—	—
3	July 18, 2025	978-4-253-30310-1	—	—
4	March 18, 2026	978-4-253-01245-4	—	—
5	October 20, 2026	978-4-253-02029-9	—	—
