= You Can't Escape from Mizudako-chan! =

Japanese manga series

- First tankōbon volume cover

ミズダコちゃんからは逃げられない！ (Mizudako-chan kara wa Nigerarenai!)
- Genre: Coming-of-age; Romance
- Manga
- Written by: Megame
- Published by: Houbunsha
- English publisher: NA: Yen Press
- Imprint: FUZ Comics
- Magazine: Comic Fuz
- Original run: October 14, 2023 – present
- Volumes: 6

You Can't Escape from Mizudako-chan! (Japanese: ミズダコちゃんからは逃げられない！, Hepburn: Mizudako-chan kara wa Nigerarenai!) is a Japanese manga series written and illustrated by Megame. It began serialization on Houbunsha's Comic Fuz manga website in October 2023.

== Synopsis ==
Kanisuke Akigai is an ordinary high school student who becomes classmates with the transfer student Yuuko Mizuda, aka. Mizudako. Mizudako initially attracts attention with her tentacles, but after an incident where she destroys a student's desk after they make sexual remarks about her tentacles, she becomes isolated. Later, Kanisuke helps sort out the misunderstanding about Mizudako with her classmates, she shows gratitude for his intervention and unintentionally transforms his head into that of an octopus.

== Publication ==
Written and illustrated by Megame, You Can't Escape from Mizudako-chan! began serialization on Houbunsha's Comic Fuz manga website on October 14, 2023. Its chapters have been compiled into six tankōbon volumes as of November 2026.

During their panel at New York Comic Con 2025, Yen Press announced that they had licensed the series for English publication, with the first volume being released in April 2026.

No.	Original release date	Original ISBN	North American release date	North American ISBN
1	June 3, 2024	978-4-8322-0408-9	April 28, 2026	979-8-8554-1751-7
0. "Mizudako-chan Invades!"; 1. "Catch and Romance"; 2. "Favorite Food"; 3. "All-Powerful Hair"; 4. "Watchmen"; 5. "Lunch Break"; 6. "The Wriggler Club"; Bonus
2	October 1, 2024	978-4-8322-0442-3	October 27, 2026	979-8-8554-1753-1
7. "Sam Adam, Principal"; 8. "The Melancholy of Uki Surafune"; 9. "Nasuo Sarafune, Senju-User"; 10. "The Wriggler Club Gets Started!"; 11. "Boiled Octopus-chan"; 12. "Koma Iwane, the Fierce Carrying Turtle"; 13. "Mr. Octopus"; 14. "Special Reward"; 15. "Asa, Hiru, Yuu"; Bonus
3	April 1, 2025	978-4-8322-0493-5	March 23, 2027	979-8-8554-4720-0
4	October 1, 2025	978-4-8322-0546-8	—	—
5	June 1, 2026	978-4-8322-0623-6	—	—
6	November 2, 2026	978-4-8322-0667-0	—	—

== Reception ==
The series was nominated for the twelfth Next Manga Award in 2026 in the web category.
