= Your Castle's Little Helper =

Japanese light novel series

- First light novel volume cover

あなたのお城の小人さん (Anata no Oshiro no Kobito-san)
- Genre: Isekai, slice of life
- Novel series
- Written by: Kazuhito Minagi
- Published by: Shōsetsuka ni Narō
- Original run: April 4, 2021 – present
- Light novel
- Written by: Kazuhito Minagi
- Illustrated by: PenekoR
- Published by: Square Enix
- English publisher: NA: Yen Press
- Imprint: SQEX Novel
- Original run: April 7, 2022 – present
- Volumes: 7
- Manga
- Written by: Kazuhito Minagi
- Illustrated by: Kazumi Kurihara
- Published by: Square Enix
- English publisher: NA: Square Enix (digital) Yen Press
- Imprint: Gangan Comics Up!
- Magazine: Manga Up!
- Original run: July 2, 2024 – present
- Volumes: 5

Your Castle's Little Helper (あなたのお城の小人さん, Anata no Oshiro no Kobito-san) is a Japanese light novel series written by Kazuhito Minagi and illustrated by PenekoR. It began serialization on Shōsetsuka ni Narō in April 2021. It was later acquired by Square Enix who began publishing it under their SQEX Novel imprint in April 2022. A manga adaptation illustrated by Kazumi Kurihara began serialization on Square Enix's Manga Up! manga service in July 2024.

== Synopsis ==
Chihiro Sagami, an office worker from Japan, has woken up as a starving child in another world. Said child is actually the eighth princess who was abandoned by the king. In an attempt to save her life, Chihiro makes a deal with a chef where she gets food for the work she puts in their kitchen.

== Media ==
=== Light novel ===
Written by Kazuhito Minagi, Your Castle's Little Helper began serialization on Shōsetsuka ni Narō on April 4, 2021. It was later acquired by Square Enix who began publishing the series with illustrations by PenekoR under their SQEX Novel light novel imprint on April 7, 2022. Seven volumes have been released as of October 7, 2026.

In April 2026, Yen Press announced that they had licensed the series for English publication, with the first volume set to release in October of the same year.

No.	Original release date	Original ISBN	English release date	English ISBN
Part 1
1	April 7, 2022	978-4-7575-7872-2	October 13, 2026	979-8-8554-3226-8
"The Kitchen's Little Helper"; "The Prince's Little Helper"; Short Story: "The Prince's Little Helper"; "The Royal Knights' Little Helper"; "The Castle Town's Little Helper"; Short Story: "The Castle Town's Little Helper"; "His Majesty's Little Helper"; "You're Everyone's Little Helper"; "The Little Helper's Knight"; "Embroidered Roses and the Little Helper"; "The Secret Base's Little Helper"; "The Honeybees and the Little Helper"; "The Forest's Bounty and the Little Helper"; "The Secret Little Helper"; "Your Castle's Little Helper"
2	November 7, 2022	978-4-7575-8248-4	April 13, 2027	979-8-8554-3228-2
3	July 6, 2023	978-4-7575-8654-3	—	—
4	January 6, 2024	978-4-7575-8998-8	—	—
Part 2
5	September 5, 2025	978-4-301-00046-4	—	—
6	March 6, 2026	978-4-301-00377-9	—	—
7	October 7, 2026	978-4-301-00802-6	—	—

=== Manga ===
A manga adaptation illustrated by Kazumi Kurihara began serialization on Square Enix's Manga Up! manga service on July 2, 2024. The manga's chapters have been compiled into five tankōbon volumes as of September 2026.

The manga's chapters are published in English on Square Enix's Manga Up! Global manga service. In June 2026, Yen Press announced that they had also licensed the manga adapatation for English publication, with the first volume set to release in December 2026.

No.	Original release date	Original ISBN	English release date	English ISBN
1	October 7, 2024	978-4-7575-9462-3	December 8, 2026	979-8-8554-3222-0
2	March 7, 2025	978-4-7575-9727-3	—	—
3	September 5, 2025	978-4-301-00041-9	—	—
4	March 6, 2026	978-4-301-00371-7; 978-4-301-00372-4 (SE)	—	—
5	September 7, 2026	978-4-301-00730-2; 978-4-301-00731-9 (SE)	—	—

== Reception ==
The manga adaptation was ranked 5th in the sixth Sanyodo Bookstore Comic Awards in 2025. The manga, alongside Toshoshitsu no Kihara, was ranked eleventh in the 2026 edition of Takarajimasha's Kono Manga ga Sugoi! guidebook's list of the best manga for female readers. The manga was ranked third in the Nationwide Bookstore Employees' Recommended Comics list of 2026. The manga, alongside Kōshaku-sama, Akusai no Watashi wa Mō Hōtteoite Kudasai, won the Isekai Comic Prize at the 2026 Digital Comic Awards.
