= Snowmelt and Agapanthus =

Japanese manga series

- First tankōbon volume cover

雪解けとアガパンサス (Yukidoke to Agapansasu)
- Genre: Yuri
- Manga
- Written by: Nauchi
- Published by: ASCII Media Works
- English publisher: NA: Yen Press
- Imprint: Dengeki Comics NEXT
- Magazine: Comic Dengeki Daioh "g"
- Original run: September 27, 2022 – July 26, 2025
- Volumes: 5

Snowmelt and Agapanthus (雪解けとアガパンサス, Yukidoke to Agapansasu) is a Japanese manga series written and illustrated by Nauchi. It was serialized in ASCII Media Works' Comic Dengeki Daioh "g" magazine from September 2022 to July 2025, with its chapters compiled into five volumes.

== Synopsis ==
Though admired by her classmates for her prince-like aura, good grades, and athletic prowess, Natsuki feels empty inside. That is until a transfer student named Shun enters her life. Natsuki starts to genuinely develop feelings for Shun due to her viewing Natsuki as a friend than an idol.

== Publication ==
Written and illustrated by Nauchi, Snowmelt and Agapanthus was serialized in ASCII Media Works' Comic Dengeki Daioh "g" magazine from September 27, 2022 to July 26, 2025. Its chapters were compiled into five tankōbon volumes released from March 25, 2023 to September 27, 2025.

During their panel at Anime North 2026, Yen Press announced that they had licensed the series for English publication.

| No. | Original release date | Original ISBN | North American release date | North American ISBN |
|---|---|---|---|---|
| 1 | March 25, 2023 | 978-4-04-914952-4 | January 26, 2027 | 979-8-8554-3805-5 |
| 2 | October 26, 2023 | 978-4-04-915333-0 | — | — |
| 3 | May 27, 2024 | 978-4-04-915754-3 | — | — |
| 4 | January 27, 2025 | 978-4-04-916253-0 | — | — |
| 5 | September 27, 2025 | 978-4-04-916696-5 | — | — |

== Reception ==
The series was nominated for the ninth Next Manga Awards in the web category. The series was later nominated for the tenth edition in 2024 in the same category.
