= How to Handle My Sassy Big Sis =

Japanese manga series

- First tankōbon volume cover

生意気なギャル姉を解らせる話 (Namaiki na Gal Ane o Wakaraseru Hanashi)
- Manga
- Written by: Numa Egaki
- Published by: Shueisha
- English publisher: NA: Yen Press
- Imprint: Young Jump Comics
- Magazine: Tonari no Young Jump
- Original run: July 12, 2024 – present
- Volumes: 5

How to Handle My Sassy Big Sis (生意気なギャル姉を解らせる話, Namaiki na Gyaru Ane o Wakaraseru Hanashi; lit. "The Story of Making My Cheeky Gal Sister Understand") is a Japanese manga series written and illustrated by Numa Egaki. It was originally posted as an adult manga on Egaki's Pixiv account in November 2023, before beginning serialization on Shueisha's Tonari no Young Jump online service in July 2024. The series has been compiled into five volumes as of September 2026.

== Plot ==
The series follows Tanuki, a high school student whose older stepsister Komaru goes to a correspondence school located next door. Due to the correspondence school's reputation, the students of Tanuki's school often mock their students. Tanuki and Komaru are not on good terms despite being family; however, his friend advises him to become closer to her, saying that her cheeky personality could give way to a cute one if she opens up to him. Thus, Tanuki decides to help Komaru show her true feelings.

== Characters ==
Shinji Tanuki (田貫 しんじ, Tanuki Shinji)
A high school student who studies at a preparatory school in Hiroshima. He lives with his parents, while Komaru lives separately in an apartment. He and Komaru are not on good terms with each other, but he wants to understand her better. Despite their current relationship, he feels protective about her.
Komaru Konno (紺野 こまる, Konno Komaru)
Voiced by: Sumire Uesaka (PV)
Shinji's older stepsister. She in her early twenties and studies at a correspondence high school next to Shinji's school. She has the appearance of a gyaru, and has developed a bratty personality, which he wants to change. She is bad with alcohol, to the point that she once had to be rescued by Shinji after she was tricked during a drinking party. She was abused and abandoned by her parents and was taken in by Shinji's family, who were her relatives. After Higashioka resigns from the school, she starts working part-time at a restaurant.
Takenaka (竹中)
Shinji's best friend, who advised him to try to become closer to Komaru so she could show her true feelings.
Hiroshi Higashioka (東岡 広, Higashioka Hiroshi)
Komaru's teacher. He is known as the Passionate Teacher because of his dedication to his work, but he got into a controversy over him making advances towards his students. He is interested in Komaru and tried making advances towards her.
Hikaru Mochizuki (望月 ひかる, Mochizuki Hikaru)
A member of the sports festival committee, who has obsessive feelings for Shinji and his familial relationship with Komaru.

== Development ==
Egaki wanted to write a manga about the relationship between a rebellious older sister and an introverted younger brother. They wanted to write their own version of a romantic comedy, using their own family experiences as inspiration for the plot.

== Publication ==
The series was originally posted as an adult manga on Egaki's Pixiv account on November 29, 2023. They later started serializing it on Shueisha's Tonari no Young Jump online service on July 12, 2024. The first tankōbon volume was released on January 17, 2025; a promotional video featuring Sumire Uesaka as Komaru was released to coincide with its release. Five volumes have been released as of September 17, 2026.

In March 2026, Yen Press announced that they had licensed the series for English publication, with the first volume set to release in September later in the year.

No.	Original release date	Original ISBN	English release date	English ISBN
1	January 17, 2025	978-4-08-893507-2	September 22, 2026	979-8-8554-2903-9
2	September 19, 2025	978-4-08-893753-3	April 27, 2027	979-8-8554-4714-9
3	December 18, 2025	978-4-08-894079-3	—	—
4	May 19, 2026	978-4-08-894258-2	—	—
5	September 17, 2026	978-4-08-894402-9	—	—

== Reception ==
The series was nominated for Niconico's second Manga General Election in 2025, placing second in the Heart-Pounding category.
