= Hollow Regalia =

Japanese light novel series

- Cover of the first light novel volume

虚ろなるレガリア (Utsuronaru Regaria)
- Genre: Fantasy
- Light novel
- Written by: Gakuto Mikumo
- Illustrated by: Miyū
- Published by: ASCII Media Works
- English publisher: NA: Yen Press
- Imprint: Dengeki Bunko
- Original run: June 10, 2021 – present
- Volumes: 6
- Manga
- Written by: Gakuto Mikumo
- Illustrated by: Matsuki Ugatsu
- Published by: ASCII Media Works
- English publisher: NA: Yen Press
- Magazine: Dengeki Maoh
- Original run: September 27, 2022 – August 27, 2024
- Volumes: 4

Hollow Regalia (Japanese: 虚ろなるレガリア, Hepburn: Utsuronaru Regaria) is a Japanese light novel series written by Gakuto Mikumo and illustrated by Miyū. It began publication under ASCII Media Works' Dengeki Bunko imprint in June 2021; as of February 2024, six volumes have been released. A manga adaptation, illustrated by Matsuki Ugatsu, was serialized in Dengeki Maoh from September 2022 to August 2024, with its individual chapters collected into four volumes.

== Plot ==
In a post-apocalyptic world, Yahiro Narusawa struggles to survive monsters and bandits. One day, the twin sisters Julietta "Juli" and Rosetta "Ro" Berith seek him. Yahiro is code named "Lazarus" because he has a healing factor and seeming immortality. The sisters want to hire him to steal the Kushinada, an item that can supposedly control the monsters. In exchange, they will help him find his sister Sui, whom he bitterly hates and wants to kill.

== Media ==
=== Light novel ===
Written by Gakuto Mikumo and illustrated by Miyū, the light novel began publication under ASCII Media Works' Dengeki Bunko imprint on June 10, 2021. As of February 2024, six volumes have been released.

In September 2022, Yen Press licensed the light novel for English publication.

==== Volumes ====
No.	Title	Original release date	English release date
1	Corpse Reviver	June 10, 2021; 978-4-04-913252-6	March 21, 2023; 978-1-9753-5279-0
2	Between the Dragon and the Deep Blue Sea 龍と蒼く深い海の間で	December 10, 2021; 978-4-04-913905-1	August 22, 2023; 978-1-9753-6861-6
3	All Hell Breaks Loose	June 10, 2022; 978-4-04-914282-2	December 12, 2023; 978-1-9753-7262-0
4	Where Angels Fear To Tread	December 9, 2022; 978-4-04-914577-9	April 16, 2024; 978-1-9753-8777-8
5	When the Heavens Break and Fall 天が破れ落ちゆくとき	June 9, 2023; 978-4-04-914810-7	March 4, 2025; 978-1-9753-9394-6
6	The End of Eden 楽園の果て	February 9, 2024; 978-4-04-915202-9	September 16, 2025; 979-8-8554-0992-5

=== Manga ===
A manga adaptation, illustrated by Matsuki Ugatsu, was serialized in ASCII Media Works' magazine Dengeki Maoh form September 27, 2022, to August 27, 2024. ASCII Media Works published the individual chapters in four tankōbon volumes.

In February 2025, Yen Press also licensed the manga for English publication.

==== Volumes ====
No.	Original release date	Original ISBN	English release date	English ISBN
1	June 9, 2023	978-4-04-914884-8	August 26, 2025	979-8-8554-1234-5
2	September 26, 2023	978-4-04-915361-3	March 24, 2026	979-8-8554-1236-9
3	May 27, 2024	978-4-04-915765-9	April 27, 2027	979-8-8554-2327-3
4	October 25, 2024	978-4-04-916075-8	—	—

== Reception ==
Kim Morrissy and Rebecca Silverman of Anime News Network had differing opinions; Morrissy liked the initial plot twist but felt that it relied too heavily on tropes. Silverman liked the setting and use of folklore, though she also felt it relied too much on tropes. Demelza of Anime UK News described it as "[not] the polished fantasy series I was hoping for but there's plenty to enjoy here" and recommended it to fans of Strike the Blood.
