= Touge Oni: Primal Gods in Ancient Times =

Japanese manga series

- First tankōbon volume cover

峠鬼 (Tōge Oni)
- Genre: Historical fantasy
- Manga
- Written by: Kenji Tsurubuchi
- Published by: Enterbrain
- English publisher: NA: Yen Press
- Imprint: Harta Comix
- Magazine: Aokishi; (April 13, 2018 – February 15, 2019); Harta; (August 10, 2019 – present)
- Original run: April 13, 2018 – present
- Volumes: 9
- icon

Touge Oni: Primal Gods in Ancient Times (Japanese: 峠鬼, Hepburn: Tōge Oni) is a Japanese manga series written and illustrated by Kenji Tsurubuchi. It was initially serialized in the Aokishi booklet of Enterbrain's seinen manga magazine Harta from April 2018 to February 2019. It later began serialization in the Harta magazine in August 2019.

== Publication ==
Written and illustrated by Kenji Tsurubuchi, Touge Oni: Primal Gods in Ancient Times was initially serialized in the bimonthly Aokishi booklet of Enterbrain's seinen manga magazine Harta from April 13, 2018, to February 15, 2019. It later began serialization in the Harta magazine on August 10, 2019. Its chapters have been compiled into nine tankōbon volumes as of August 2026. The series is licensed in English by Yen Press.

No.	Original release date	Original ISBN	North American release date	North American ISBN
1	August 10, 2019	978-4-04-735614-6	August 22, 2023	978-1-9753-6257-7
2	August 10, 2019	978-4-04-735748-8	November 21, 2023	978-1-9753-6259-1
3	August 12, 2020	978-4-04-736103-4	April 16, 2024	978-1-9753-6261-4
4	April 15, 2021	978-4-04-736614-5	July 30, 2024	978-1-9753-6263-8
5	March 15, 2022	978-4-04-736761-6	December 10, 2024	978-1-9753-6824-1
6	April 14, 2023	978-4-04-737176-7	July 22, 2025	978-1-9753-9400-4
7	August 9, 2024	978-4-04-737944-2	September 23, 2025	979-8-8554-1923-8
8	August 12, 2025	978-4-04-738406-4	December 15, 2026	979-8-8554-3990-8
9	August 12, 2026	978-4-04-500125-3	—	—

== Reception ==
MyAnimeList users recommended the series under the category "Unique Story/Art" in their 2024 manga recommendations list.
