= Deep-Sea Aquarium Magmell =

Japanese manga series

- First tankōbon volume cover

マグメル深海水族館 (Magumeru Shinkai Suizokukan)
- Genre: Coming-of-age
- Manga
- Written by: Kiyomi Sugishita
- Published by: Shinchosha
- English publisher: NA: Yen Press
- Imprint: Bunch Comics
- Magazine: Go Go Bunch; (April 8, 2017 – February 9, 2018); Kurage Bunch; (March 9, 2018 – present)
- Original run: April 8, 2017 – present
- Volumes: 10

Deep-Sea Aquarium Magmell (マグメル深海水族館, Magumeru Shinkai Suizokukan) is a Japanese manga series written and illustrated by Kiyomi Sugishita. It was initially serialized in Shinchosha's seinen manga magazine Go Go Bunch from April 2017 to February 2018. After the magazine was discontinued, it was transferred to the Kurage Bunch website in March 2018.

== Synopsis ==
The series is set in an aquarium that is 200 meters below Tokyo Bay called "Magmell Deep Sea Aquarium". It is centered around Kotaro Tenjo, a young boy who is a fan of deep-sea creatures, and has started working a part-time job as a cleaner in the aquarium.

== Publication ==
Written and illustrated by Kiyomi Sugishita, Deep-Sea Aquarium Magmell was initially serialized in Shinchosha's seinen manga magazine Go Go Bunch from April 8, 2017, to February 9, 2018. After the magazine was discontinued, it was transferred to the Kurage Bunch website resuming serialization on March 9, 2018. Its chapters have been compiled into ten tankōbon volumes as of April 2025.

In February 2026, Yen Press announced that they had licensed the manga for English publication, with the first volume set to release in August later in the year.

No.	Original release date	Original ISBN	English release date	English ISBN
1	December 9, 2017	978-4-10-772029-0	August 25, 2026	979-8-8554-2156-9
Prologue: "Giant Squid"; 1. "Giant Isopod"; 2. "Frilled Shark"; 3. "Venus's Flower-Basket"; 4. "Sperm Whale"
2	June 9, 2018	978-4-10-772086-3	December 15, 2026	979-8-8554-2158-3
3	December 7, 2018	978-4-10-772138-9	—	—
4	July 9, 2019	978-4-10-772200-3	—	—
5	January 9, 2020	978-4-10-772239-3	—	—
6	August 6, 2020	978-4-10-772306-2	—	—
7	May 8, 2021	978-4-10-772378-9	—	—
8	April 8, 2022	978-4-10-772488-5	—	—
9	September 8, 2023	978-4-10-772610-0	—	—
10	April 9, 2025	978-4-10-772814-2	—	—

== Reception ==
The series was ranked fourteenth in the 2019 edition of Takarajimasha's Kono Manga ga Sugoi! guidebook of the best manga for female readers.
