= The World After the Fall =

South Korean web novel series

- Author: Sing-Shong
- Country: South Korea
- Language: Korean
- Genre: Action
- Publisher: Noi Company
- Published: February 2, 2022 – present
- Media type: web novel

The World After the Fall

멸망 이후의 세계 RR: Myeolmang ihuui segye MR: Myŏlmang ihuŭi segye
- Author: singNsong
- Illustrator: Undead Ttalgi
- Publisher: Redice Studio
- English publisher: NA: Yen Press
- Webtoon service: Naver Webtoon (Korean); Line Webtoon (English)
- Original run: February 7, 2022 – present

The World After the Fall (Korean: 멸망 이후의 세계) is a South Korean web novel written by Sing-Shong. It was serialized in Munpia's digital comic and fiction platform Naver beginning on February 2, 2022. A webtoon adaptation of The World After the Fall was first serialized in Webtoon on February 7, 2022. It received official English translations by Line Webtoon beginning with April 2022. An aeni adaptation by Studio EEK has been announced.

== Plot ==
Jae-hwan was an ordinary person buying chips at a local convenience store when strange towers suddenly appeared around the world, summoning people inside. Choosing to accept the summons, he witnessed monsters ravaging his home and managed to conquer 100 levels, defeating various boss monsters along the way. In the end, Jae-hwan discovered that the Tower was an illusion and that humanity had not been destroyed. He fights against those who created the Towers, which serve as cultivation methods for the Gods and Lords. As he confronts these adversaries, Jaehwan vows to dismantle the system and the world that betrayed him. His ultimate foe is Big Brother, the master of the System itself.

== Media ==
=== Webtoon ===
A webtoon adaptation launched in Webtoon on February 7, 2022. The webtoon has been published by Line Webtoon in English.

=== Aeni ===
An aeni television series adaptation by Studio EEK has been announced.
