= Witches Can't Be Collared =

Japanese light novel series

- First light novel volume cover

魔女に首輪は付けられない (Majo ni Kubiwa wa Tsukerarenai)
- Genre: Action; Fantasy; Mystery
- Light novel
- Written by: Yuri Yumemi
- Illustrated by: Wata
- Published by: ASCII Media Works
- English publisher: NA: Yen Press
- Imprint: Dengeki Bunko
- Original run: February 9, 2024 – present
- Volumes: 4
- Manga
- Written by: Yuri Yumemi
- Illustrated by: Makuei
- Published by: Kadokawa Shoten
- English publisher: NA: Yen Press
- Imprint: Kadokawa Comics A
- Magazine: Young Ace
- Original run: October 4, 2024 – September 4, 2025
- Volumes: 2
- icon

Witches Can't Be Collared (Japanese: 魔女に首輪は付けられない, Hepburn: Majo ni Kubiwa wa Tsukerarenai) is a Japanese light novel series written by Yuri Yumemi and illustrated by Wata. It began publication under ASCII Media Works' Dengeki Bunko light novel imprint in February 2024. A manga adaptation illustrated by Makuei was serialized in Kadokawa Shoten's seinen manga magazine Young Ace from October 2024 to September 2025.

== Media ==
=== Light novel ===
Written by Yuri Yumemi and illustrated by Wata, Witches Can't Be Collared began publication under ASCII Media Works' Dengeki Bunko light novel imprint on February 9, 2024. Four volumes have been released as of October 9, 2026.

On February 28, 2025, Yen Press announced that they had licensed the light novels for English publication beginning in August 2025.

No.	Original release date	Original ISBN	North American release date	North American ISBN
1	February 9, 2024	978-4-04-915525-9	August 12, 2025	979-8-8554-1742-5
2	September 10, 2024	978-4-04-915700-0	April 14, 2026	979-8-8554-1878-1
3	June 10, 2025	978-4-04-916232-5	October 13, 2026	979-8-8554-3827-7
4	October 9, 2026	978-4-04-916759-7	—	—

=== Manga ===
A manga adaptation illustrated by Makuei was serialized in Kadokawa Shoten's seinen manga magazine Young Ace from October 4, 2024, to September 4, 2025, and was collected into two tankōbon volumes.

On June 12, 2026, Yen Press announced that they had also licensed the manga adaptation for English publication beginning in December 2026.

No.	Original release date	Original ISBN	English release date	English ISBN
1	March 4, 2025	978-4-04-811460-8	December 15, 2026	979-8-8554-3815-4
2	October 3, 2025	978-4-04-116606-2	—	—

== Reception ==
The series won the Grand Prize at the 30th Dengeki Novel Prize in 2023.
