= Rise of the Lowborn: Ascending the Ranks by Crushing Incompetent Nobles =

Japanese light novel series

- First light novel volume cover

平民出身の帝国将官、無能な貴族上官を蹂躙して成り上がる (Heimin Shusshin no Shōkan, Munō na Kizoku Jōkan o Jūrin Shite Nariagaru)
- Genre: Fantasy
- Novel series
- Written by: Kosaka Hanane
- Published by: Kakuyomu
- Original run: July 14, 2022 – present
- Light novel
- Written by: Kosaka Hanane
- Illustrated by: Kurogiri
- Published by: Fujimi Shobo
- English publisher: NA: Yen Press
- Imprint: Fujimi Fantasia Bunko
- Original run: March 19, 2024 – present
- Volumes: 5
- Manga
- Written by: Kosaka Hanane
- Illustrated by: Shun Obuchi
- Published by: Kadokawa Shoten
- Imprint: Kadokawa Comics A
- Magazine: Young Ace Up
- Original run: March 28, 2024 – present
- Volumes: 5

Rise of the Lowborn: Ascending the Ranks by Crushing Incompetent Nobles (平民出身の帝国将官、無能な貴族上官を蹂躙して成り上がる, Heimin Shushhun no Shōkan, Munō na Kizoku Jōkan o Jūrin Shite Nariagaru) is a Japanese light novel series written by Kosaka Hanane and illustrated by Kurogiri. It began serialization as a web novel on Kadokawa Corporation's Kakuyomu website in July 2022. It later began publication under Fujimi Shobo's Fujimi Fantasia Bunko imprint in March 2024. A manga adaptation illustrated by Shun Obuchi began serialization on Kadokawa Shoten's Young Ace Up website in March 2024.

== Synopsis ==
After being appointed as a military Imperial General, Hazen Heim is sent to the front lines due to his commoner background. While at the front lines, Hazen deals with superiors who take credit for his and others achievements, malicious leadership, and incompetent subordinates. However, Hazen remembers his past life as a powerful mage, and vows to use his experience to get his revenge on his superiors.

== Media ==
=== Light novel ===
Written by Kosaka Hanane, Rose of the Lowborn: Ascending the Ranks by Crushing Incompetent Nobles began serialization as a web novel on Kadokawa Corporation's Kakuyomu website on July 14, 2022. It later began publication under Fujimi Shobo's Fujimi Fantasia Bunko light novel imprint on March 19, 2024. Five volumes have been released as of May 20, 2026.

In May 2026, Yen Press announced that they had licensed the series for English publication, with the first volume released in November 2026.

No.	Original release date	Original ISBN	North American release date	North American ISBN
1	March 19, 2024	978-4-04-075304-1	November 10, 2026	979-8-85-542696-0
2	August 20, 2024	978-4-04-075415-4	March 9, 2027	979-8-85-542699-1
3	March 19, 2025	978-4-04-075732-2	—	—
4	September 20, 2025	978-4-04-075936-4	—	—
5	May 20, 2026	978-4-04-076305-7	—	—
6	November 20, 2026	978-4-04-076598-3	—	—

=== Manga ===
A manga adaptation illustrated by Shun Obuchi began serialization on Kadokawa Shoten's Young Ace Up website on March 28, 2024. The manga's chapters have been compiled into five tankōbon volumes as of June 2026.

No.	Release date	ISBN
1	August 26, 2024	978-4-04-115276-8
2	January 10, 2025	978-4-04-115680-3
3	July 10, 2025	978-4-04-116307-8
4	December 10, 2025	978-4-04-116908-7
5	June 10, 2026	978-4-04-117431-9

== Reception ==
The series was ranked sixth in the bunkobon category at the 2024 Next Light Novel Awards. The series was ranked seventh in the same category in the 2025 edition.
