= In the Heavenly Prison, the Devil Enchants Me =

Japanese manga series

- First tankōbon volume cover, featuring Kaoru Shabana (front) and Kanra (back)

天獄で悪魔がボクを魅惑する (Tengoku de Akuma ga Boku o Miwaku Suru)
- Genre: Comedy; Fantasy; Romance
- Manga
- Written by: Meteor Gingami
- Published by: Fujimi Shobo
- English publisher: NA: Yen Press
- Imprint: Dragon Comics Age
- Magazine: Niconico Seiga (Dra Dra Sharp#)
- Original run: March 25, 2022 – present
- Volumes: 5
- icon

In the Heavenly Prison, the Devil Enchants Me (Japanese: 天獄で悪魔がボクを魅惑する, Hepburn: Tengoku de Akuma ga Boku o Miwaku Suru) is a Japanese web manga series written and illustrated by Meteor Gingami. It has been serialized on Niconico Seiga's Dra Dra Sharp# website from March 2022.

== Plot ==
Kaoru Shabana, a sheltered young man seeking independence, enrolls at Kibujima Academy—a remote institution secretly operated by succubi who prey upon male students. Upon arrival, he falls under the predatory attention of Kanra, the seductive yet ruthless leader of the student council. Trapped alongside other male students, Kaoru must navigate a perilous existence where every interaction with the academy's alluring rulers risks complete physical and mental subjugation. With escape routes heavily guarded and willpower constantly tested by supernatural temptation, the students' survival depends on resisting both Kanra's personal advances and the systematic harvesting conducted by her succubi sisters. Their only hope lies in maintaining their fading humanity long enough to uncover Kibujima's secrets and break free from this gilded prison.

== Publication ==
Written and illustrated by Meteor Gingami, In the Heavenly Prison, the Devil Enchants Me started on Niconico Seiga's Dra Dra Sharp# website on March 25, 2022. Fujimi Shobo has collected its chapters into individual tankōbon volumes, with the first one released on November 18, 2022. As of February 9, 2026, five volumes have been released.

In North America, the manga has been licensed for English release by Yen Press.

=== Volumes ===
| No. | Original release date | Original ISBN | English release date | English ISBN |
|---|---|---|---|---|
| 1 | November 8, 2022 | 978-4-04-074722-4 | March 25, 2025 | 979-8-8554-1550-6 |
| 2 | August 9, 2023 | 978-4-04-075077-4 | August 26, 2025 | 979-8-8554-1552-0 |
| 3 | June 7, 2024 | 978-4-04-075469-7 | March 24, 2026 | 979-8-8554-1667-1 |
| 4 | April 9, 2025 | 978-4-04-075866-4 | March 23, 2027 | 979-8-8554-3376-0 |
| 5 | February 9, 2026 | 978-4-04-076151-0 | — | — |

== Reception ==
Anime News Network's MrAJCosplay offered a mixed review, noting that the series struggles with tonal inconsistency as it attempts to blend fantasy, mystery and horror elements without fully committing to any genre. While praising the bold, sketch-like artwork, the critique found the narrative unfocused—too restrained to be effectively titillating, frightening or dramatically engaging. The reviewer ultimately deemed the series's scattered approach unsatisfying compared to more cohesive works.
