= Though You May Burn to Ash =

Japanese manga series by Kakashi Oniyazu

- First tankōbon volume cover

たとえ灰になっても (Tatoe Hai ni Nattemo)
- Manga
- Written by: Kakashi Oniyazu
- Published by: Square Enix
- English publisher: NA: Yen Press
- Imprint: YG Comics
- Magazine: Young Gangan
- Original run: December 18, 2015 – February 1, 2019
- Volumes: 6
- Manga

Subete Hai ni Natte mo
- Written by: Tsujimori
- Illustrated by: Sake no. Marine
- Published by: Square Enix
- Imprint: Gangan Comics UP!
- Magazine: Manga Up!
- Original run: October 26, 2018 – August 28, 2020
- Volumes: 5
- icon

Though You May Burn to Ash (Japanese: たとえ灰になっても, Hepburn: Tatoe Hai ni Nattemo) is a Japanese manga series written and illustrated by Kakashi Oniyazu. It was serialized in Square Enix's seinen manga magazine Young Gangan from December 2015 to February 2019, with its chapters collected in six tankōbon volumes.

== Plot ==
High school student Shinomiya Ryouma desperately tries to raise a billion yen to pay for treatment for his sister Yukina. One day, a mysterious woman asks him if he is willing to risk everything to get what he wants. When he says yes and she invites him to a game, he is killed in an accident. He abruptly wakes up in the body of a girl, along with others the woman invited, killed in accidents, and turned into girls. The woman, named Cruel, reveals herself as an apparent angel. She wants them to play a special game. Winning means gaining her boundless fortune, but losing means death.

== Publication ==
Written and illustrated by Kakashi Oniyazu, Though You May Burn to Ash started in Square Enix's seinen manga magazine Young Gangan on December 18, 2015. On February 27, 2019, it was announced that Oniyazu had died on February 2; Square Enix decided to cancel the series, making its 56th chapter, published on February 1, the last one. Square Enix collected its chapters in six tankōbon volumes, released from July 25, 2016, to April 25, 2019.

In North America, the manga was licensed for English release by Yen Press.

A spin-off manga, titled Subete Hai ni Natte mo (すべて灰になっても; lit. 'Though Everything May Turn to Ash'), written by Tsujimori and illustrated by Sake no. Marine, was serialized on Square Enix's Manga Up! app from October 26, 2018, to August 28, 2020. Square Enix collected its chapters in five tankōbon volumes, released from April 25, 2019, to October 7, 2020.

=== Volumes ===
No.	Original release date	Original ISBN	English release date	English ISBN
1	July 25, 2016	978-4-7575-5060-5	April 10, 2018	978-0-316-48010-9
2	January 25, 2017	978-4-7575-5198-5	June 26, 2018	978-0-316-44687-7
3	July 25, 2017	978-4-7575-5421-4	September 18, 2018	978-1-975-32740-8
4	January 25, 2018	978-4-7575-5605-8	February 19, 2019	978-1-975-32943-3
5	July 25, 2018	978-4-7575-5764-2	May 21, 2019	978-1-975-33052-1
6	April 25, 2019	978-4-7575-6072-7	February 4, 2020	978-1-975-30617-5
