= Yen Press =

American manga publishing company

- Parent company: Kadokawa Corporation (51%); Hachette Book Group (49%)
- Status: Active
- Founded: 2006; 20 years ago
- Founder: Kurt Hassler; Rich Johnson
- Country of origin: United States
- Headquarters location: New York City, New York, U S.
- Distribution: Hachette Book Group (U.S.); Diamond Book Distributors (international)
- Imprints: Yen On; JY; Ize Press
- Official website: www.yenpress.com; www.jyforkids.com

Yen Press is an American manga, graphic novel and light novel publisher co-owned by Kadokawa Corporation and Hachette Book Group. It published Yen Plus, a monthly comic anthology, between 2008 and 2013. Over the last few years, they expanded their website to include an audiobook catalog with more than 10 different genres. In addition to translated material, Yen Press has published original series, most notably Svetlana Chmakova's Nightschool and a manga adaptation of James Patterson's Maximum Ride.

== History ==
Yen Press was founded in 2006 by former Borders buyer Kurt Hassler and DC Comics VP Rich Johnson. In July 2007, it was announced that Yen Press was to absorb ICEkunion, a Korean publisher that had been publishing manhwa in the United States. While the manga titles bearing ICEkunion's label would continue to be sold in stores, subsequent printings would bear the Yen Press logo. Hassler assured fans, "We plan to pick up all the existing [ICEkunion] titles...We're going to continue everything, so fans shouldn't worry. None of these series are going to fall into a void."

The first issue of Yen Press's comic magazine Yen Plus was published on July 29, 2008. The magazine became online-only in 2010 and was discontinued altogether in 2013.

In 2009, Yen Press announced that it had acquired the rights to Kiyohiko Azuma's manga Yotsuba&! and Azumanga Daioh from their former licensee, A.D. Vision. In September 2009, Yen Press reissued the first five volumes of Yotsuba&!, in addition to publishing the sixth volume; Azumanga Daioh was reissued with a new translation in December 2009.

On April 11, 2016, it was announced that Yen Press would function as a joint venture between Hachette Book Group and major Japanese publisher Kadokawa Dwango, with Kadokawa owning 51% of the company.

In 2017, Yen Press launched JY, an imprint for publishing graphic novels aimed at middle-grade readers.

On April 15, 2022, Yen Press, in collaboration with REDICE Studio and RIVERSE, launched Ize Press, an imprint for publishing Korean webtoons and novels, with their first titles being, 7Fates: Chakho, Dark Moon, and The Star Seekers all written and illustrated by HYBE in collaboration with BTS, Enhypen, and Tomorrow X Together respectively. Other titles included were Tomb Raider King, The World After the Fall, The Boxer, My Gently Raised Beast, The Remarried Empress, and Villains Are Destined to Die.

At Anime NYC 2022, J-Novel Club announced its partnership with Yen Press in order to print their titles.

In June 2023, Yen Press began licensing novels from Kadokawa's Tsukasa Bunko novel imprint for its JY imprint.

== Titles ==
* - Published under the JY imprint
+ - Serialized in Yen Plus
† - Digital distribution rights only due to being a Square Enix title. Viz Media has the rights for series' paperback releases.
‡ - Published under the Ize Press imprint

=== Original series ===
- Beautiful Creatures
- The Beginning After the End
- Berrybrook Middle School series*
- The Clique
- Cuckoos Three
- Daniel X+
- The Dark-Hunters: Infinity
- Gabby & Gator
- Gossip Girl+
- Hollow City
- The Infernal Devices
- Interview with the Vampire: Claudia's Story
- Kitty & Dino
- Maximum Ride+
- Milkyway Hitchhiking
- Miss Peregrine's Home for Peculiar Children
- The Mortal Instruments
- The Night Angel Trilogy
- Nightschool+
- New Moon: The Graphic Novel
- Reindeer Boy
- Soulless
- Twilight: The Graphic Novel
- Witch & Wizard
- The Wolf Gift
- The World of Quest
- Zoo

=== Manga ===
- The 11th Cat Is Nene!
- The 13th Footprint
- 15 Minutes Before We Really Date
- The 31st Consort
- 86
- 86: Operation High School
- About a Place in the Kinki Region
- ACCA: 13-Territory Inspection Dept.
- ACCA 13-Territory Inspection Dept. P.S.
- Accel World
- Adachi and Shimamura
- Adult's Picture Book
- The Adventures of Othello and Archimedes
- After Midnight Skin
- After We Gazed at the Starry Sky
- After-School Bitchcraft
- After-School Duty
- After-school Hanako-kun
- Akame ga Kill!
- Akame ga Kill! Zero
- Ako and Bambi
- The Alchemist Who Survived Now Dreams of a Quiet City Life
- Aldnoah.Zero Season One
- Alice in Murderland
- Alice in the Country of Hearts
- Alice in the Country of Hearts: My Fanatic Rabbit
- Alice on Deadlines
- All or Nothing
- Alma-chan Wants to Be a Family!
- Almark
- Alone Together in the Nurse's Office
- Alya Sometimes Hides Her Feelings in Russian
- The Anemone Feels the Heat
- The Angel of Elhamburg
- Angels of Death
- Angels of Death Episode.0
- Ani - Imo
- Animan
- Anne Happy
- Another
- Aoharu × Machinegun
- Aphorism
- Apocalypse Bringer Mynoghra
- Appare-Ranman!
- Apparently, Disillusioned Adventurers Will Save the World
- Are You Alice?
- Aria of the Beech Forest
- As Miss Beelzebub Likes
- Associate Professor Akira Takatsuki's Conjecture
- Assorted Entanglements
- The Asterisk War
- Azumanga Daioh
- B. Ichi
- Baccano!
- Baka and Test
- Bamboo Blade+
- Banished from the Hero's Party, I Decided to Live a Quiet Life in the Countryside
- Barakamon
- Battle Royale
- Be My Worst Nightmare!
- Beatstrings
- Beneath the Fur
- Bestia
- The Betrayal Knows My Name
- Big Hero 6
- Big Order
- Black Bullet
- Black Butler+
- Black Detective
- Black God
- Black Summoner
- Blade & Bastard
- Blend S
- The Blood-Crawling Princess of a Ruined Country
- Blood Lad
- Bloody Brat
- Bloody Cross
- Bocchi the Rock!
- Bocchi the Rock! Comic Anthology
- Bocchi the Rock! Side Story: Kikuri Hiroi's Heavy-Drinking Diary
- Bofuri: I Don't Want to Get Hurt, so I'll Max Out My Defense.
- The Boy and the Beast
- The Boy Who Ruled the Monsters: Before I Knew It, the Ultimate Specialized Support Skill Led to the World’s Ultimate Party!
- Breasts Are My Favorite Things in the World!
- Bride of the Barrier Master
- A Bride's Story
- The BS Situation of Tougetsu Umidori
- Btooom!
- The Bubble Love of the Mermaid
- Bunny Drop
- Bungo Stray Dogs
- Bungo Stray Dogs: Another Story, Vol. 1: Yukito Ayatsuji vs. Natsuhiko Kyogoku
- Bungo Stray Dogs: BEAST
- Bungo Stray Dogs: Dazai, Chuuya, Age Fifteen
- Bungo Stray Dogs: Dead Apple
- Bungo Stray Dogs: The Untold Origins of the Detective Agency
- Bungo Stray Dogs: Wan!
- Bungo Stray Dogs Official Anthology
- Bushinden: Left as a Sacrifice, I Was Divinely Chosen to Master the Art of Combat
- Call the Name of the Night
- Can't Stop Cursing You
- Captivated, by You
- Caring for a Corpse
- Carole & Tuesday
- The Case Study of Vanitas
- Cat Paradise
- Catch These Hands!
- Caterpillar Girl and Bad Texter Boy
- A Certain Magical Index
- Chaika - The Coffin Princess
- Chained Soldier
- Champignon Witch
- Cheeky Brat
- Cheerful Amnesia
- Chef in the Demon King's Castle: Despite All the Scary-Hot Demons, This Is a Great Workplace
- Chewed Flesh, Ground Bones
- Chihaya Re:Start!
- Chio's School Road
- Chitose Is in the Ramune Bottle
- Cirque du Freak
- Clear and Cloudy Skies
- Clevatess: The King of Dark Beasts, the Baby, and the Undead Hero
- Cocoon Entwined
- Coffee Moon
- The Color of the End: Mission in the Apocalypse
- Combatants will be Dispatched!
- Common-Sense Monster
- Contract Sisters
- Convenient Semi-Friend
- Corpse Party: Blood Covered
- Corpse Party: Book of Shadows
- Corpse Princess
- Count Fujiwara's Suffering
- Crimson Prince
- Crimson-Shell
- Cross-Dressing Villainess Cecilia Sylvie
- The Crow's Ballad at Dawn
- Dance in the Déjà Vu of Spring
- Dara-san of Reiwa
- The Dark History of the Reincarnated Villainess
- Darker than Black
- The Daughter of the Demon Lord Is Too Kind!
- Days on Fes
- Days with My Stepsister
- Dead Mount Death Play
- Dead Mount Death Play Side Story: Phantom Solitaire's Art of Disguising Oneself as a Supernatural Being
- Dear NOMAN
- Death March to the Parallel World Rhapsody
- Deep-Sea Aquarium Magmell
- The Deer King
- Defying Expectations with Gravity Magic to Be Unparalleled
- Delicious in Dungeon
- Demi-Human Sharehouse
- The Demon Bride: "I Love You" Are Frightening Words
- Demon From Afar
- Demon King Ena-sama Goes to a Manga School
- Demon Lord 2099
- The Demon Sword Master of Excalibur Academy
- Demonizer Zilch
- The Demons Are Planning Something Good
- Desire of the Untouchable Flower
- The Deskmate Cat and the Love Novice
- Desperate March for Love
- The Detective Is Already Dead
- Detroit: Become Human: Tokyo Stories
- The Devil Is a Part-Timer!
- The Devil Is a Part-Timer! High School!
- The Devil Is a Part-Timer! Official Anthology Comic
- Dimension W
- The Disappearance of Nagato Yuki-chan
- Disenchantment Camera
- Dive!!
- Divine Incursions
- Do You Like the Nerdy Nurse?
- Do You Love Your Mom and Her Two-Hit Multi-Target Attacks?
- The Do-Over Damsel Conquers the Dragon Emperor
- Don't Confuse Me, Yamori-kun
- Don't Talk to Me
- Doomsday With My Dog
- Doubt
- Double the Trouble, Twice as Nice
- Dragon Girl
- The Dragon Prince's Ill-Mated Betrothal
- The Dragon School Is Atop the Mountain
- Dragons Rioting
- Dreams of Nubatama
- Dungeons That Surely Slaughter Adventurers
- Durarara!!
- Durarara!! Re;Dollars Arc
- Éclair: A Girls' Love Anthology That Resonates in Your Heart
- egg: I'm Your Child
- Elden Ring: Become Lord
- Elden Ring: Distant Tales Between
- Elden Ring: The Road to the Erdtree
- The Elder Sister-like One
- Embrace Your Size
- The Eminence in Shadow
- Emma
- Eniale & Dewiela
- The Ephemeral Scenes of Setsuna's Journey
- Erased
- The Essence of Being a Muse
- Excellent Property, Rejects for Residents
- Exchange Parties with Anthropomorphic Figures
- Even a Replica Can Fall in Love
- Everyone's Darling Has a Secret
- The Executioner and Her Way of Life
- The Failure at God School
- The Fake Alchemist
- Farewell, Daisy: Jun Mayuzuki Short Story Collection
- Farewell to My Alter
- Fate Rewinder: All Great Feats Require Time
- Fate/Prototype: Fragments of Sky Silver
- The Fiancée Chosen by the Ring
- Fiancée of the Wizard
- Final Fantasy Lost Stranger
- Final Fantasy Type-0
- Final Fantasy Type-0 Side Story
- First Love Monster
- For the Kid I Saw in My Dreams
- Forbidden Scrollery
- Fox-Colored Jealousy
- Friday at the Atelier
- From Old Country Bumpkin to Master Swordsman: My Hotshot Disciples Are All Grown Up Now, and They Won’t Leave Me Alone
- From the Red Fog
- Fruits Basket
- Fruits Basket Another
- Fruits Basket: The Three Musketeers Arc
- Full Metal Panic! Family
- Fullmetal Alchemist †
- Futari Switch
- GA Geijutsuka Art Design Class
- Gabriel DropOut
- Gahi-chan!
- Gals Can't Be Kind to Otaku!?
- Game of Familia
- The Garden Where Prisms Bloom
- The Gay Who Turned Kaiju
- The Geek Ex-Hitman
- The Girl I Saved on the Train Turned Out to Be My Childhood Friend
- The Girl Past the Filters
- The Girl Without a Face
- The Girls Offered at My Altar
- Girls' Last Tour
- Glitch
- Goblin Slayer
- Goblin Slayer: Brand New Day
- Goblin Slayer Side Story: Year One
- Goblin Slayer Side Story II: Dai Katana
- Goblin Slayer: A Day in the Life
- God Bless the Mistaken
- God Shining Moonlight Howling Moon
- GOGOGOGO-GO-GHOST!
- Golden Japanesque: A Splendid Yokohama Romance
- Golden Man
- Gou-dere Sora Nagihara
- Graineliers
- The Great Yet Flawed Gods
- Grim Reaper and 4 Girlfriends
- Grimgar of Fantasy and Ash
- Guillotine Bride
- Gusts and Beats
- The Guy She Was Interested in Wasn't a Guy at All
- The Hachioji Specialty: Tengu's Love
- Hakumei and Mikochi
- Hana-chan and the Shape of the World
- Hand in Hand with Mu-chan: Lessons from My Autistic Daughter
- Handa-kun
- Handyman Saitou in Another World
- Happy Sugar Life
- Hard-boiled Stories from the Cat Bar
- Hatsu*Haru
- He Was My Brother
- He's My Only Vampire
- Helena and Mr. Big Bad Wolf
- Hell Is Dark with No Flowers
- Hereditary Triangle
- The Hero is Overpowered but Overly Cautious
- The Hero Laughs While Walking the Path of Vengeance a Second Time
- Hero Tales+
- The Heroic Tale of the Villainous Prince
- Heterogenia Linguistico
- Hi, I'm a Witch, and My Crush Wants Me to Make a Love Potion
- High School DxD
- High School DxD: Asia and Koneko's Secret Contracts!?
- High School Prodigies Have It Easy Even in Another World
- Highschool of the Dead
- Higurashi When They Cry+
- Higurashi: When They Cry: MEGURI
- Higurashi When They Cry Gou Anthology Comic
- Himeyuka and Rozione's Story
- Hinatsugimura
- Hinowa ga Crush!
- Hirano and Kagiura
- The Hitman Stans
- Hollow Regalia
- holoX MEETing!
- How to Keep a Human
- The Honor Student at Magic High School
- Honey Lemon Soda
- Honey Trap Shared House
- Horimiya
- Horror Collector
- How to Handle My Sassy Big Sis
- Hybrid × Heart Magias Academy Ataraxia
- I Cannot Reach You
- I Don't Know How to Give Birth!
- I Don't Know How to Love
- I Don't Know Which Is Love
- I Don't Need a Happy Ending
- I Got a Cheat Skill in Another World and Became Unrivaled in the Real World, Too
- I Kept Pressing the 100-Million Button and Came Out on Top
- I Love You So Much, I Hate You
- I Made Friends with the Second Prettiest Girl in My Class
- I May Be a Guild Receptionist, But I'll Solo Any Boss to Clock Out on Time
- I Want a Gal Gamer to Praise Me
- I Want to be a Receptionist in This Magical World
- I Want to Be a Wall
- I Want You to Expose Me
- I Was a Bottom-Tier Bureaucrat for 1,500 Years, and the Demon King Made Me a Minister
- I'll Become a Villainess Who Goes Down in History: It Seems Turning into a High-Born Baddie Makes the Prince All the More Lovestruck
- I'm a Behemoth, an S-Ranked Monster, but Mistaken for a Cat, I Live as an Elf Girl's Pet
- I'm Here, Beside You
- I'm Just in a Faux BL
- #ImLookingForZombies
- I'm Quitting Heroing
- I'm the Catlords' Manservant
- I'm the Hero, but the Demon Lord's Also Me
- I'm the Monster Girl You Once Saved: A Middle-Aged Teacher in Another World is Concerned About His Sudden Popularity
- I'm the Villainess, So I'm Taming the Final Boss
- I've Been an Omega Since Today
- I've Been Killing Slimes for 300 Years and Maxed Out My Level
- I've Been Killing Slimes for 300 Years and Maxed Out My Level Spin-off: The Red Dragon Academy for Girls
- Ibitsu
- The Ice-Core Meteoria
- Ichiroh!
- Id:Invaded #Brake Broken
- The Idol's Escape
- If It's You, I Might Try Falling in Love
- If the RPG World Had Social Media
- If the Villainess and Villain Met and Fell in Love
- If Witch, Then Which?
- If You Could See Love
- The Illustrated Guide to Monster Girls
- Im: Great Priest Imhotep
- The Immortal Girl's Breeding and Cultivation Travelogue
- Immortality and Punishment
- In Another World, My Sister Stole My Name
- In Another World With My Smartphone
- In Such a Small World
- In the Heavenly Prison, the Devil Enchants Me
- In the Land of Leadale
- The Innocent
- Inu x Boku SS
- Interspecies Reviewers
- Interspecies Reviewers Comic Anthology: Darkness
- Is It Wrong to Try to Pick Up Girls in a Dungeon?
- Is It Wrong to Try to Pick Up Girls in a Dungeon? II
- Is It Wrong to Try to Pick Up Girls in a Dungeon? Familia Chronicle
- Is It Wrong to Try to Pick Up Girls in a Dungeon? Familia Chronicle Episode Freya
- Is It Wrong to Try to Pick Up Girls in a Dungeon? Memoria Freese
- Is It Wrong to Try to Pick Up Girls in a Dungeon?: Days of Goddess
- Is It Wrong to Try to Pick Up Girls in a Dungeon?: Sword Oratoria
- Is the Hot-Voiced Streamer Into Me?!
- Is the Order a Rabbit?
- Is This a Zombie?
- Isekai Samurai
- The Isolator
- Isshiki-san Wants to Know About Love
- It's a Little Late, but I've Fallen in Love with My Childhood Friend
- It's All Your Fault
- Izumi and the Dragon Encyclopedia
- Judge
- Josee, the Tiger and the Fish
- Kagerou Daze
- Kaiju Girl Caramelise
- Kakegurui – Compulsive Gambler
- Kakegurui Twin
- Kaoru Mori: Anything and Something
- K-On!+
- K-On! College
- K-On! High School
- K-On! Shuffle
- Karneval
- Kaze no Hana
- Kemono Friends a la Carte
- Kemono Friends: Welcome to Japari Park!
- The Kept Man of the Princess Knight
- Keyaki Shopping District's Sakura Bathhouse
- Kieli
- Killed Again, Mr. Detective?
- Killing Me!
- Kind of a Wolf
- Kingdom Hearts II
- Kingdom Hearts III
- Kingdom Hearts 358/2 Days
- Kingdom Hearts Final Mix
- Kingdom Hearts: Chain of Memories
- Kin-iro Mosaic
- Kin-iro Mosaic, Best Wishes
- Kiss and White Lily for My Dearest Girl
- Kiss the Scars of the Girls
- Kobato
- KonoSuba: An Explosion on This Wonderful World!
- Konosuba: Even More Explosions on This Wonderful World!
- KonoSuba: God's Blessing on this Wonderful World!
- Kowloon Generic Romance
- Kunon the Sorcerer Can See
- Kuzumi-kun, Can't You Read the Room?
- Laid-Back Camp
- Land
- Last Round Arthurs
- Let me listen to your heartbeat
- Let This Grieving Soul Retire! Woe is the Weakling Who Leads the Strongest Party
- Let's Go Karaoke!
- Let's Go Nirvana!
- Lethal Dose of Love
- Li'l Miss Vampire Can't Suck Right
- Liar, Liar
- Lilies Blooming in 100 Days
- Lilies in Love for 101 Days
- Lily: Lost and Found Again ~By the Sweet Lies and Love of a Nobleman Since Their First Night~
- Liselotte & Witch's Forest
- List Rouge
- Little Miss P
- Little Witch Academia*
- Log Horizon
- Log Horizon: The West Wind Brigade
- A Long & Short Love Story
- Lord Hades's Ruthless Marriage
- Lord Hades's Vernal Honeymoon
- Lost Lad London
- Love and Heart
- Love at Fourteen
- Love at the City's Edge on a Moonlit Night
- Love Bullet
- Love of Kill
- Love Me to My Core
- Love Quest
- The Lowly Elf Is the Blackhearted King's Plaything
- Luciole Has a Dream
- Lust Geass
- Lycoris Recoil
- Lycoris Recoil Official Comic Anthology: Reload
- Mad Miniscape
- Mage of Reda
- Magia Record: Puella Magi Madoka Side Story
- Magia Record: Puella Magi Madoka Side Story Another Story
- Magic Doctor Rex's Perverted Medical Record
- Magical Explorer
- The Magical Girl and the Evil Lieutenant Used to Be Archenemies
- Magical Girl Incident
- Magical Girl Raising Project
- Magical Midlifer
- The Magical Revolution of the Reincarnated Princess and the Genius Young Lady
- The Maid I Hired Recently Is Mysterious
- The Maid Is a Vampire
- Maiden of the Needle
- Mama Akuma
- Mane Mane Nichi Nichi: Baseball Manager Everyday
- Manner of Death
- Maoyu
- Me and My Beast Boss
- Mechanical Marie
- Megarosalia
- Meiji-Era Master-and-Servant Tungsten
- The Melancholy of Haruhi Suzumiya
- The Melancholy of Suzumiya Haruhi-chan
- Merit and the Egyptian God
- Mermaid Boys
- Mermaid Observation Diary
- meth-e-meth
- Mieruko-chan
- Minami Nanami Wants to Shine
- Minato's Laundromat
- Mint Chocolate
- A Misanthrope Teaches a Class for Demi-Humans
- The Misfortune of Kyon and Koizumi
- Miss Savage Fang
- Mizuno and Chayama
- Mobile Suit Gundam: The Witch From Mercury: Vanadis Heart
- Mobile Suit Zeta Gundam Define
- Monstaboo
- Monster and the Beast
- Monster of Absolute Evil
- Monster Tamer Girls
- Monster Tribe
- Monster Wrestling
- Monster-Colored Island
- Monstrosities and Me
- Monthly Girls' Nozaki-kun
- Monthly in the Garden with My Landlord
- The Moon and the Pietà
- Moscow 2160
- Mr. Flower Bride
- Mr. Flower Groom
- Murciélago
- My Beloved Supper
- My Broken Mariko
- My Childhood Friend Meows Under the Skirt
- My Dear, Curse-Casting Vampiress
- My First Love With You Again
- My Gemini
- My Girlfriend Is a Colossal Cutie
- My Girlfriend's a Geek
- My Instant Death Ability Is So Overpowered, No One in This Other World Stands a Chance Against Me! —AΩ—
- My Mate Is a Feline Gentleman
- My Monster Girl's Too Cool for You
- My Oh My, Atami-kun
- My Poison Princess Is Still Cute
- My Yandere Girlfriend Hiding in the Dungeon Kills Me Over and Over Again
- My Youth Romantic Comedy Is Wrong, As I Expected @comic
- N
- Nabari no Ou+
- Napping Princess: The Story of the Unknown Me
- NeNeNe
- Neighborhood Craftsmen: Stories from Kanda's Gokura-chou
- New Japan Academy
- New York New York
- Nightmare Inspector: Yumekui Kenbun †
- Nights with a Cat
- Ninja Soccer
- No Game No Life Chapter 2: Eastern Union
- No Game No Life, Please!
- No Longer Heroine
- No Matter How I Look at It, It's You Guys' Fault I'm Not Popular!
- Nomi × Shiba
- Non and Akari
- Not Love But Delicious Foods
- Now Playing
- Nyankees
- O-Parts Hunter †
- Of the Red, the Light, and the Ayakashi
- Oh, My Sweet Alien!
- Olympos
- Omamori Himari
- Once Upon a Witch's Death
- One More Step, Come Stand by My Side
- One Week Friends
- Oninagi
- Oshi no Ko
- The Other World's Books Depend on the Bean Counter
- The Otherworlder, Exploring the Dungeon
- Our Last Crusade or the Rise of a New World
- Out of the Cocoon
- Overlord
- Overlord a la Carte
- Overlord: The Undead King Oh!
- Pandora Hearts+
- Pandora Seven
- The Parasite Princess
- Pardon the Intrusion, I'm Home!
- A Peach Offering for the Imperial Court
- Penguin Gentlemen
- Penguin Highway
- Phantom Invasion
- Phantom Tales of the Night
- Pink & Habanero
- Planarian Humans
- Play It Cool, Guys
- Playing Death Games to Put Food on the Table
- Please Look After the Dragon
- Please Put Them On, Takamine-san
- Plunderer
- A Polar Bear in Love
- Prison School
- Psyche, Dancing in the Storm
- Puella Magi Homura Tamura
- Puella Magi Kazumi Magica: The Innocent Malice
- Puella Magi Madoka Magica
- Puella Magi Madoka Magica: The Different Story
- Puella Magi Madoka Magica: Homura's Revenge
- Puella Magi Madoka Magica: The Movie -Rebellion-
- Puella Magi Madoka Magica: Wraith Arc
- Puella Magi Oriko Magica
- Puella Magi Oriko Magica Sadness Prayer
- Puella Magi Suzune Magica
- Puella Magi Tart Magica: The Legend of Jeanne d'Arc
- The Purple Clavel: They Took Everything, So I’ve Bloomed Once More as a Villainous Femme Fatale
- The Ragnarok System of the Desperate Reincarnated Demon Lord and the Seven Aggressive Maidens
- Rascal Does Not Dream of Bunny Girl Senpai
- Raw Hero
- Re:Zero − Starting Life in Another World
- Re:Zero – The Frozen Bond
- Reborn as a Polar Bear: The Legend of How I Became a Forest Guardian
- Reborn as a Vending Machine, I Now Wander the Dungeon
- Reborn to Master the Blade: From Hero-King to Extraordinary Squire
- The Record of a Fallen Vampire †
- The Record of Fantastical Nomenclature
- The Red Thread
- The Reformation of the World as Overseen by a Realist Demon King
- Reign of the Seven Spellblades
- The Reincarnated Devil's Plot for Raising the Ultimate Hero
- A Reincarnated Witch Spells Doom
- Reincarnation Coliseum: The Weakest Skill Conquers the Strongest Women and Creates a Harem
- Rejected by the Hero's Party, a Princess Decided to Live a Quiet Life in the Countryside
- Renaissance Eve
- Restaurant to Another World
- Revenge Agent Hizumi-san
- Riviere and the Land of Prayer
- Rock Is a Lady's Modesty
- Rokka -Braves of the Six Flowers-
- Romeo × Juliet
- Rose Guns Days
- Rose Guns Days Sorrowful Cross Knife
- The Royal Tutor
- Run on Your New Legs
- Rust Blaster
- Sacrificial Princess and the King of Beasts
- Sacrificial Princess and the King of Beasts Heir: White Rabbit and the Prince of Beasts
- Sadako at the End of the World
- Saekano: How to Raise a Boring Girlfriend
- The Saga of Tanya the Evil
- Sailor Zombie
- Saint? Nope, Just a Monster Tamer Passing Through
- Saki
- Sakura no Himegoto
- Sasaki and Miyano
- Sasaki and Peeps
- Sasameke
- Scenes from Awajima
- School-Live!
- School-Live! Letters
- School of Horns
- Scum's Wish
- Scumbag Loser
- Secret
- The Secret Sakura Shares
- Secretly, I've been Suffering about being Sexless
- Secrets of the Silent Witch
- See You Tomorrow at the Food Court
- Seeds of Anxiety: Asterisk
- Sekirei
- Sekiro Side Story: Hanbei the Undying
- Senpai, This Can't Be Love!
- Sentenced to Be a Hero
- Servant × Service
- Servant Beast
- Seven Little Sons of the Dragon: A Collection of Seven Stories
- Sex Ed 120%
- Shadow Student Council Vice President Gives Her All
- Shadows House
- Sharkmaid of the Shore
- She Likes Gays, but Not Me
- She Loves to Cook, and She Loves to Eat
- Shibuya Goldfish
- Shigahime
- The Shiunji Family Children
- Shoulder-a-Coffin Kuro
- Shut-In Shoutarou Kominami Takes on the World
- Shy
- Silver Spoon
- Sinful Is the Angel Who Loves
- Singularity Love: A Kenji Tsurubuchi Collection
- A Sinner of the Deep Sea
- Sister and Giant: A Young Lady Is Reborn in Another World
- The Skeleton Enchanted by the Cursed Blade: The Greatest Demon Lord, Who Conquers the Dungeon and Commands an Invincible Army
- Skull-face Bookseller Honda-san
- Slasher Maidens
- The Small-Animallike Lady Is Adored by the Ice Prince
- Smokin' Parade
- Snowmelt and Agapanthus
- So, I Can't Play H!
- So I'm a Spider, So What?
- So I'm a Spider, So What? The Daily Lives of the Kumoko Sisters
- So What's Wrong with Getting Reborn as a Goblin?
- SOTUS
- Soul Eater+
- Soul Eater Not!
- Space Dandy
- Spice and Wolf
- Spice and Wolf Diner: Gourmet Exploration
- Spiral: The Bonds of Reasoning
- Spirits & Cat Ears
- The Splendid Work of a Monster Maid
- Spring Storm and Monster
- Spy Classroom
- Spy Classroom 2nd Period: Daughter Dearest
- Spy Classroom 3rd Period: Forgetter
- Spy Classroom 4th Period: Blazing Fire
- S.S. Astro
- Star Wars Leia, Princess of Alderaan
- Star Wars Rebels
- Star Wars: Lost Stars
- Stardust Family
- Steam-Pipe Broom Racing
- Stomp, Kick, Love
- The Strange Creature at Kuroyuri Apartments
- Strategic Lovers
- Strawberry Fields Once Again
- Stray Cat & Wolf
- Strike the Blood
- Studio Apartment, Good Lighting, Angel Included
- Studio Cabana
- Stupid Love Comedy
- The Succubus Meets Her Match
- Sugar Apple Fairy Tale
- Summer Boy Blues
- The Summer Hikaru Died
- Summer Love Begins with a Lie -squall-
- Sumomomo Momomo+
- Sunbeams in the Sky
- Sundome
- Sunshine Sketch
- Super Ball Girls
- Super String: Marco Polo's Travel to the Multiverse
- The Survived Alchemist with a Dream of Quiet Town Life!
- Suzuki-kun's Mindful Life
- Suzunari!
- Sword Art Online Alternative Gun Gale Online
- Sword Art Online Ordinal Scale
- Sword Art Online Unital Ring
- Sword Art Online: Aincrad
- Sword Art Online: Calibur
- Sword Art Online: Fairy Dance
- Sword Art Online: Girls Ops
- Sword Art Online: Hollow Realization
- Sword Art Online: Kiss & Fly
- Sword Art Online: Mother's Rosario
- Sword Art Online: Phantom Bullet
- Sword Art Online: Progressive
- Sword Art Online: Progressive - Barcarolle of Froth
- Sword Art Online: Progressive - Canon of the Golden Rule
- Sword Art Online: Progressive - Scherzo of Deep Night
- Sword Art Online: Project Alicization
- Sword Art Online: Re:Aincrad
- Taboo Tattoo
- Takahashi from the Bike Shop
- Takane-san and Arashi-chan
- Taking Care of God
- Tale of the Waning Moon
- Tale of the Wizrain Kingdom: The Dragon Is the Bride
- Tales of the Kingdom
- Tales of Wedding Rings
- Tamaki & Amane
- Teasing Master Takagi-san
- Tena on S-String
- Terrarium in a Drawer
- A Terrified Teacher at Ghoul School!
- The Terrifying Students at Ghoul School!
- Thank You for Taking Care of Our Boy Banri
- That Time I Got Reincarnated as a Slime: The Ways of the Monster Nation
- Then Shall I Kill in Your Stead?
- Thermae Romae
- This Monster Wants to Eat Me
- This Wolf Is Not Scary
- Thou Shalt Not Die
- Though You May Burn to Ash
- Three Days of Happiness
- Thus Spoke the Rabbit
- The Tiger Won't Eat the Dragon Yet
- A Timid Lady was Turned into an Ugly Cat, but on the Verge of Fainting Is Picked Up by the Most Fearsome Military Duke
- To Save the World, Can You Wake Up the Morning After with a Demi-Human?
- To Sir, Without Love: I'm Divorcing You
- Today's Cerberus
- Tohyo Game: One Black Ballot to You
- Toilet-Bound Hanako-kun
- Tokujo-chan: The Girls Who Brighten Your Day
- Tokyo Babylon
- Tokyo Ravens
- Torture Princess: Fremd Torturchen
- Touge Oni: Primal Gods in Ancient Times
- Tougen Anki: Legend of the Cursed Blood
- Touring After the Apocalypse
- Toxy Noxy Foresty Forest
- Triage X
- Trinity Seven
- Trinity Seven -Revision-
- Tsubaki-chou Lonely Planet
- Twilight Vessel Gods
- Twinkle Stars
- Two A.M. at the Dining Table
- Übel Blatt
- Ugly Duckling's Love Revolution
- Umineko When They Cry
- Uncle from Another World
- UNKNOWN
- Unnamed Memory
- Until Death Do Us Part
- Val × Love
- The Vampire & His Pleasant Companions
- Victoria of Many Faces
- The Villainess Stans the Heroes
- The Villainesses Are Unwavering
- The War Ends the World / Raises the World
- Welcome to the Erotic Bookstore
- Welcome to Wakaba-Soh
- What Do You Call This Trash?
- What Six Survivors Told...
- What This World Is Made Of
- When a Magician's Pupil Smiles
- When I Became a Commoner, They Broke Off Our Engagement!
- When the Villainess Seduces the Main Heroine
- Whenever Our Eyes Meet... A Women's Love Anthology
- The White Cat's Revenge as Plotted from the Dragon King's Lap
- Who Killed the Hero?
- Whoever Steals This Book
- The Whole of Humanity Has Gone Yuri Except for Me
- Witch and Cat
- Witch and Hound
- The Witch and the Knight Will Survive
- Witch Life in a Micro Room
- The Witch's House: The Diary of Ellen
- A Witch's Life in Mongol
- A Witch's Love at the End of the World
- Witch's Printing Office
- Witches Can't Be Collared
- The Witches' Marriage
- With the Light
- With You, Our Love Will Make It Through
- Wolf and Parchment: New Theory Spice & Wolf
- Wolf Children: Ame & Yuki
- The Wolf Never Sleeps
- Wonder Boy
- Woof Woof Story: I Told You to Turn Me Into a Pampered Pooch, Not Fenrir!
- Words Bubble Up Like Soda Pop
- The World's Finest Assassin Gets Reincarnated in Another World as an Aristocrat
- The World's Strongest Rearguard: Labyrinth Country's Novice Seeker
- Yamada's Class Diary
- Yankee & Carameliser
- Yattara
- Yokohama Station SF
- Yoshi no Zuikara: The Frog in the Well Does Not Know the Ocean
- Yotsuba&!+
- You Can't Escape from Mizudako-chan!
- Your Castle's Little Helper: Please Feed Me, I'll Work
- Your Forma
- Your Name
- Your Name. Another Side:Earthbound
- Your Turn to Die: Majority Vote Death Game
- Yowamushi Pedal
- Yuri Life
- Zo Zo Zombie*
- Zombie-Loan

=== Manhwa ===
- 7Fates: Chakho‡
- 11th Cat
- 13th Boy
- The Abandoned Empress
- Angel Diary
- The Antique Gift Shop
- Aron's Absurd Armada+
- Beware the Villainess!‡
- Bloody Sweet
- The Boxer‡
- Bring It On!
- A Business Proposal‡
- Chocolat
- Codename: Anastasia‡
- Comic
- Corpse Knight Gunther
- Croquis Pop
- Cynical Orange
- Dark Moon: The Blood Altar
- Daughter of the Emperor
- Finding Camellia‡
- Footsteps in the Snow‡
- Forest of Gray City
- Freak
- Goong
- Heavenly Executioner Chiwoo
- Hissing
- The Horizon‡
- I Love Amy ‡
- I Tamed My Ex-husband's Mad Dog ‡
- Imitation
- Itaewon Class‡
- Jack Frost+
- Jungle Juice‡
- Kill the H
- King of Eden
- Lady Devil‡
- Laon
- Legend
- Legroom‡
- Level Up with the Gods
- Lover Boy‡
- Marriage of Convenience‡
- Men of the Harem
- The Merman Trapped in My Lake ‡
- Merry Marbling‡
- Mignon‡
- Moon Boy
- Murderous Lewellyn's Candlelit Dinner‡
- My Gently Raised Beast‡
- My Secretly Hot Husband‡
- Not-Sew-Wicked Stepmom‡
- Omniscient Reader's Viewpoint‡
- On the Way to Meet Mom‡
- One Fine Day+
- One Thousand and One Nights
- Overgeared‡
- The Perks of Being an S-class Heroine‡
- Philomel the Fake‡
- Pig Bride+
- Radio Storm‡
- Raiders
- Real Lies
- The Remarried Empress‡
- A Returner's Magic Should Be Special
- Reunion‡
- Sarasah+
- See You in My 19th Life‡
- Semantic Error‡
- Seven Sundays‡
- Solo Leveling‡
- Special Civil Servant‡
- The Star Seekers‡
- SSS-Class Revival Hunter‡
- Sugarholic
- Tied to You‡
- Time and Again+
- Tomb Raider King‡
- The Uncanny Counter‡
- Unholy Blood‡
- Very! Very! Sweet
- The Villainess Is a Marionette‡
- The Villainess Turns the Hourglass‡
- Villains Are Destined to Die‡
- Void's Enigmatic Mansion
- What Does the Fox Say?
- What's Wrong with Secretary Kim?
- Why Raeliana Ended Up at the Duke's Mansion
- The World After the Fall‡
- You're So Cool
- Your Letter‡

=== Manhua ===
- An Ideal World
- The History of The West Wing
- Step
- The Three-Body Problem
- Wild Animals

=== Novels/Light novels ===
- 5 Centimeters per Second
- 86
- 86—Alter
- 1,000 Words to Live
- About a Place in the Kinki Region
- Accel World
- Agents of the Four Seasons
- The Alchemist Who Survived Now Dreams of a Quiet City Life
- Almark
- Alya Sometimes Hides Her Feelings in Russian
- Amalgam Hound
- And Thus, the Wizard Noi Garené Became a Bride 100 Years Later
- The Angel Next Door Spoils Me Rotten
- Another
- Another 2001
- Another: Episode S/0
- Apparently, Disillusioned Adventurers Will Save the World
- Argonaut: Is It Wrong to Try to Pick Up Girls in a Dungeon? Tales of Heroes
- Associate Professor Akira Takatsuki's Conjecture
- The Asterisk War
- Ayakashi à la Mode
- The Azure Sword, Slayer of Distortions
- Babel
- Baccano!
- Banished from the Hero's Party
- Before the Tutorial Starts: A Few Things I Can Do to Keep the Bosses Alive
- Black Bullet
- Black Dungeon Castle
- Black Summoner
- Blade & Bastard
- Bofuri: I Don't Want to Get Hurt, so I'll Max Out My Defense.
- Bond & Book
- Bone Ash
- Book Girl
- Bottom-tier Character Tomozaki
- The Boy and the Beast
- The Bride of Demise
- Bride of the Barrier Master
- Brunhild the Dragonslayer
- The BS Situation of Tougetsu Umidori
- Bungo Stray Dogs
- Bungo Stray Dogs: Storm Bringer
- Buying a Classmate Once a Week
- Bye Bye, Earth
- Canine Detective Chris*
- A Certain Magical Index
- A Certain Magical Index NT
- A Certain Magical Index SS
- The Chef of the Adventurers' Tavern
- Children Who Chase Lost Voices
- Chitose Is in the Ramune Bottle
- Chronicles of the Hidden World: How I Became a Doctor for the Gods
- Combatants Will Be Dispatched!
- The Contract of the Phantom and His Servant
- Cross-Dressing Villainess Cecilia Sylvie
- Cross-Dressing Villainess Cecilia Sylvie: Extra Round!
- Date A Live
- Days with My Stepsister
- Death March to the Parallel World Rhapsody
- The Deer King
- Defeating the Demon Lord's a Cinch (If You've Got a Ringer)
- The Demon King Seems to Have Infiltrated the Hero's Party
- Demon Lord 2099
- The Demon Sword Master of Excalibur Academy
- Demons' Crest
- The Detective Is Already Dead
- The Devil Is a Part-Timer!
- Did You Think My Yuri Was Just for Show?
- The Dirty Way to Destroy the Goddess's Heroes
- Divine Incursion
- Do You Love Your Mom and Her Two-Hit Multi-Target Attacks?
- Dragon and Ceremony
- Dungeon Master: Creating a Hot Spring Dungeon
- Durarara!!
- Durarara!! SH
- The Eminence in Shadow
- The Empty Box and Zeroth Maria
- The Ephemeral Scenes of Setsuna's Journey
- Even a Replica Can Fall in Love
- Even If These Tears Disappear Tonight
- Even If This Love Disappears From the World Tonight
- The Executioner and Her Way of Life
- Fate/Strange Fake
- Final Fantasy VII Lateral Biography Turks -The Kids Are Alright-
- Final Fantasy VII: On the Way to a Smile
- Fireworks
- A Flower in Black Crude Clothes
- Fox Tales
- The Garden of Words
- The Genius Prince's Guide to Raising a Nation Out of Debt (Hey, How About Treason?)
- The Girl I Saved on the Train Turned Out to Be My Childhood Friend
- Goblin Slayer
- Goblin Slayer Side Story: Year One
- Goblin Slayer Side Story II: Dai Katana
- The God of Nishi-Yuigahama Station
- Gods' Games We Play
- The Girl Who Wants to Be a Hero and the Girl Who Ought to Be a Hero
- The Girls Adrift Among the Stars
- The Greatest Demon Lord Is Reborn as a Typical Nobody
- Guillotine Bride
- Haruhi Suzumiya
- Hazure Skill: The Guild Member with a Worthless Skill is Actually a Legendary Assassin
- Hell Is Dark with No Flowers
- Hell Mode: The Hardcore Gamer Dominates in Another World with Garbage Balancing
- The Hero and His Elf Bride Open a Pizza Parlor in Another World
- The Hero is Overpowered but Overly Cautious
- The Hero Laughs While Walking the Path of Vengeance a Second Time
- Hero Syndrome
- Higehiro
- High School DxD
- High School Prodigies Have It Easy Even in Another World
- Hirano and Kagiura
- Hollow Regalia
- The Holy Grail of Eris
- Honey Lemon Soda
- Horror Collector*
- How to Eat Life
- How to Win Her Heart on the Nth Try
- I Got a Cheat Skill in Another World and Became Unrivaled in the Real World, Too
- I Kept Pressing the 100-Million Button and Came Out on Top
- I May Be a Guild Receptionist, But I'll Solo Any Boss to Clock Out on Time
- I Was a Bottom-Tier Bureaucrat for 1,500 Years, and the Demon King Made Me a Minister
- I'll Become a Villainess Who Goes Down in History
- I'm a Behemoth, an S-Ranked Monster, but Mistaken for a Cat, I Live as an Elf Girl's Pet
- I'm the Strongest in This Zombie World, But I Can't Beat This Girl!
- I'm the Villainess, So I'm Taming the Final Boss
- If the RPG World Had Social Media
- If the Villainess and Villain Met and Fell in Love
- The Immortal Witch Would Sacrifice Ten Thousand Lives to Fulfill a Simple Wish
- In My Seventh Life, I Met a Monster Princess
- In the Land of Leadale
- Ishura
- I've Been Killing Slimes for 300 Years and Maxed Out My Level
- Interspecies Reviewers: Ecstasy Days
- The Irregular at Magic High School
- Is It Wrong to Try to Pick Up Girls in a Dungeon?
- Is It Wrong to Try to Pick Up Girls in a Dungeon? Astrarea Record
- Is It Wrong to Try to Pick Up Girls in a Dungeon? Familia Chronicle
- Is It Wrong to Try to Pick Up Girls in a Dungeon? Familia Chronicle Episode Asfi
- Is It Wrong to Try to Pick Up Girls in a Dungeon? Minor Myths and Legends
- Is It Wrong to Try to Pick Up Girls in a Dungeon?: Sword Oratoria
- The Isolator
- Josee, the Tiger and the Fish
- Kafka's Journey
- Kagerou Daze
- The Kept Man of the Princess Knight
- Kieli
- The King of the Dead at the Dark Palace
- King of the Labyrinth
- King's Proposal
- Kingdom Hearts: The Novel
- Kingdom Hearts II: The Novel
- Kingdom Hearts III: The Novel
- Kingdom Hearts 358/2 Days: The Novel
- Kingdom Hearts 3D: Drop Dream Distance The Novel
- Kingdom Hearts Birth by Sleep: The Novel
- Kingdom Hearts: Chain of Memories The Novel
- Kingdom Hearts Re:coded: The Novel
- Kingdom Hearts χ
- Kino's Journey
- KonoSuba: An Explosion on This Wonderful World!
- KonoSuba: God's Blessing on This Wonderful World!
- KonoSuba: God's Blessing on This Wonderful World! Fantastic Days
- Kunon the Sorcerer Can See
- Kusunoki's Garden of Gods
- Last Round Arthurs
- The Lawyer in Shizuku-ishi Sleeps with a Wolf
- Let's Begin, a Battle Without the Hero
- Liar, Liar
- Lira and the Winds of War
- Little Witch Academia: The Nonsensical Witch and the Country of Fairies
- Log Horizon
- Looks Are All You Need
- Lord of Mysteries
- Love Is Dark
- Love Unseen Beneath the Clear Night Sky
- Lycoris Recoil: Ordinary Days
- Maboroshi
- Mafia
- Magical Explorer
- Magical Girl Raising Project
- The Magical Revolution of the Reincarnated Princess and the Genius Young Lady
- Magistealth Bad Trip
- Maiden of the Needle
- May These Leaden Battlegrounds Leave No Trace
- Meikyuu: Labyrinth Kingdom, A Tactical Fantasy World Survival Guide
- Melody of the Boundary
- Mercenary Sisters
- The Miracles of the Namiya General Store
- Mirai
- Miri Lives in the Cat’s Eyes
- A Misanthrope Teaches a Class for Demi-Humans
- The Misfit of Demon King Academy
- Miss Savage Fang
- Monsterholic
- Moscow 2160
- My First Love's Kiss
- My Girlfriend's a Geek
- My Instant Death Ability Is So Overpowered, No One in This Other World Stands a Chance Against Me!
- My Happy Marriage
- My Summoned Beast Is Dead
- My Yandere Girlfriend Hiding in the Dungeon Kills Me Over and Over Again
- My Youth Romantic Comedy Is Wrong, As I Expected
- A Mysterious Job called Oda Nobunaga
- Nagisa Natsunagi Still Wants to Be a High School Girl
- New Game Plus After Defeating the Last Boss
- The Night Is Short, Walk On Girl
- No Game No Life
- No Game No Life Practical War Game
- Oh Boy, Was I Wrong About Her
- On the Way Home After Defeating the Demon King
- Once Upon a Witch's Death: The Tale of the One Thousand Tears of Joy
- Online! The Unbeatable Game*
- Only I Know the Ghoul Saved the World
- The Only Thing I'd Do in a No-Boys-Allowed Gaming World
- The Opportunistic Princess Has All the Answers
- Orc Eroica
- Oshi no Ko: Étude for Two
- Oshi no Ko: Spica of the First Star
- The Other World's Books Depend on the Bean Counter
- The Otherworlder, Exploring the Dungeon
- Our Last Crusade or the Rise of a New World
- Our Last Crusade or the Rise of a New World: Secret File
- Our Party Nearly Wiped and Then Everything Went Downhill
- Overlord
- Pandora Hearts: Caucus Race
- Penguin Highway
- Phantom Thief Red*
- Pitch-Black Infatuation
- Playing Death Games to Put Food on the Table
- Playful Relationships
- The Place Promised in Our Early Days
- Psycome
- Rascal Does Not Dream of Bunny Girl Senpai
- Re:Zero − Starting Life in Another World
- Reborn as a Vending Machine, I Now Wander the Dungeon
- Reborn to Master the Blade: From Hero-King to Extraordinary Squire
- Recommendations for Bad Children
- The Reformation of the World as Overseen by a Realist Demon King
- Reign of the Seven Spellblades
- Reign of the Seven Spellblades: Side of Fire
- The Returned Tyrant Princess Rewrites Her Dark Past
- Rise of the Lowborn: Ascending the Ranks by Crushing Incompetent Nobles
- Riviere and the Land of Prayer
- Rokka -Braves of the Six Flowers-
- Sabikui Bisco
- The Saga of Tanya the Evil
- Sasaki and Miyano: First-Years
- Sasaki and Peeps
- Scarlet
- Scribbles
- Secrets of the Silent Witch
- Secrets of the Silent Witch (spin-off) -another-
- See You at That Site of Grace After Work
- Sentenced to Be a Hero
- Shanti
- Shino & Ren: Future
- A Sister's All You Need
- So I'm a Spider, So What?
- Solo Leveling
- Sound! Euphonium
- Spice and Wolf
- Spy Classroom
- The Story of the Moon Waiting for the Evening
- Strike the Blood
- Studio Chizu's Belle
- Sugar Apple Fairy Tale
- Suppose a Kid from the Last Dungeon Boonies Moved to a Starter Town
- Suzume
- Sword Art Online
- Sword Art Online Alternative Gun Gale Online
- Sword Art Online Alternative Clover's Regret
- Sword Art Online: Progressive
- Sword of Stallion
- Tale of the Wizrain Kingdom: The Nation's Dragon Guardian Is Reborn as a Downtrodden Young Lady
- Tezcatlipoca
- That Time I Got Reincarnated as a Slime
- Therefore, First Love Was Proven
- This Is the Wizard's Secret Weapon
- Thou, as My Knight...
- Three Days of Happiness
- To Sir, Without Love: I'm Divorcing You
- Torture Princess: Fremd Torturchen
- Tower of the Sun
- The Trials of Chiyodaku
- The Undead King's Reign of Peace
- The Unimplemented Overlords Have Joined the Party!
- Unnamed Memory
- Valkyrie Bullet
- The Vexations of a Shut-In Vampire Princess
- Victoria of Many Faces
- Wandering Witch: The Journey of Elaina
- Warlords of Sigrdrifa Rusalka
- Watching the Angel Sleep, Drowning in Bed Together
- The Weakling Who Died a Million Times
- Weathering with You
- When You Died in August
- Who Killed the Hero?
- Whoever Steals This Book
- Why Run? My Summoned Beast Is Cute!
- Wistoria: Wand and Sword
- Witches Can't Be Collared
- Wolf and Parchment: New Theory Spice & Wolf
- Wolf Children: Ame & Yuki
- Woof Woof Story: I Told You to Turn Me Into a Pampered Pooch, Not Fenrir!
- Words Bubble Up Like Soda Pop
- The World Bows Down Before My Flames
- The World's Finest Assassin Gets Reincarnated in Another World as an Aristocrat
- The World's Strongest Rearguard: Labyrinth Country's Novice Seeker
- The World's Strongest Witch
- WorldEnd
- Yami-hara
- Yokohama Station SF
- Yokohama Station SF National
- You Are My Regret
- You Call That Service?
- You Can Have My Back
- You Can't Sleep in the Snow
- Your Castle's Little Helper
- Your Forma
- Your Name.
- Your Name. Another Side:Earthbound

=== European titles ===
- Dystopia (Germany)
- Goldilocks and the Seven Squat Bears (France)
- Never Open It: The Taboo Trilogy (Spain)
- Toxic Planet (France)
- W.I.T.C.H. (Italy)*
- Y Square (Germany)
- Y Square Plus (Germany)
