= What Do You Call This Trash? =

Japanese manga series

- First tankōbon volume cover

このゴミをなんとよぶ (Konogomi o Nantoyobu)
- Genre: Romantic comedy; Comedy-drama
- Manga
- Written by: Tetsukazu
- Published by: Enterbrain
- English publisher: NA: Yen Press
- Imprint: Beam Comix
- Magazine: ComicWalker
- Original run: May 28, 2022 – August 5, 2023
- Volumes: 2

What Do You Call This Trash? (Japanese: このゴミをなんとよぶ, Hepburn: Konogomi o Nantoyobu) is a Japanese manga series written and illustrated by Tetsukazu. It was serialized on the author's Twitter account between May 2022 and August 2023, with its chapters collected by Enterbrain in two volumes.

== Synopsis ==
Yuuto has romantic feelings for his brother's ex-girlfriend, Akira. However, Akira still clings onto her feelings for Kai, and uses Yuuto's feeling for her in order to talk to Kai, to which Yuuto is willing to oblige. Kai, on the other hand, wants nothing to do with Akira due to her obsessive personality during their previous relationship.

== Publication ==
Written and illustrated by Tetsukazu, What Do You Call This Trash? was serialized on the author's Twitter account from May 28, 2022, to August 5, 2023. It was also serialized on Kadokawa's ComicWalker website under the Comic Beam label. Its chapters were collected in two tankōbon volumes that were released on November 10, 2023. The series is licensed in English by Yen Press, who released it in a 2-in-1 paperback omnibus on September 23, 2025.

No.	Original release date	Original ISBN	North American release date	North American ISBN
1	November 10, 2023	978-4-04-737682-3	September 23, 2025	979-8-8554-1621-3
Chapters 1–15; Bonus
2	November 10, 2023	978-4-04-737683-0	September 23, 2025	979-8-8554-1621-3
Chapters 16–30; Bonus

== Reception ==
The series was nominated for the ninth Next Manga Awards in the web category in 2023, and was ranked 15th.
