= Be My Worst Nightmare! =

Japanese manga series

- First tankōbon volume cover

誰か夢だと言ってくれ (Dareka Yume Dato Itte Kure)
- Genre: Boys' love
- Manga
- Written by: Michelle
- Published by: Shueisha
- English publisher: NA: Yen Press
- Imprint: Margaret Comics
- Magazine: Manga Mee
- Original run: March 30, 2021 – April 2, 2024
- Volumes: 10

Be My Worst Nightmare! (誰か夢だと言ってくれ, Dareka Yume Dato Itte Kure) is a Japanese manga series written and illustrated by Michelle. It was serialized on Shueisha's Manga Mee website from March 2021 to April 2024, with its chapters compiled into ten tankōbon volumes.

== Synopsis ==
Sayo Hoshikawa suffers from a complex due to his short stature. One day, when he witnesses his crush get turned down by a tall boy named Mashiba, he challenges him to a series of contests which goes in Mashiba's favor. Later, Mashiba calls him cute, which disgusts Sayo. Afterwards, Sayo starts having dreams about Mashiba.

== Publication ==
Written and illustrated by Michelle, Be My Worst Nightmare! was serialized on Shueisha's Manga Mee website from March 30, 2021, to April 2, 2024. Its chapters were compiled into ten tankōbon volumes released from March 25, 2022 to June 25, 2024.

During their panel at Anime Expo 2024, Yen Press announced that they had licensed the series for English publication, with the first volume being released in December 2024.

No.	Original release date	Original ISBN	North American release date	North American ISBN
1	March 25, 2022	978-4-08-855192-0	December 10, 2024	978-1-97-539754-8
Chapters 1–6.5; Bonus
2	March 25, 2022	978-4-08-855193-7	April 22, 2025	978-1-97-539756-2
Chapters 7–12; Side stories; Bonus
3	June 23, 2022	978-4-08-855195-1	August 26, 2025	978-1-97-539758-6
Chapters 13–18; Chapters 13.5, 17.5 and 18.5; Bonus
4	September 22, 2022	978-4-08-855201-9	March 24, 2026	978-1-97-539760-9
Chapters 19–24; Chapter 22.5; Bonus
5	December 23, 2022	978-4-08-855202-6	January 26, 2027	978-1-97-539762-3
6	March 24, 2023	978-4-08-855206-4	—	—
7	June 23, 2023	978-4-08-855207-1	—	—
8	October 25, 2023	978-4-08-855215-6	—	—
9	February 22, 2024	978-4-08-855216-3	—	—
10	June 25, 2024	978-4-08-855225-5; 978-4-08-855226-2 (SE)	—	—

== Reception ==
The series was ranked 6th in AnimeJapan's 6th "Most Wanted Anime Adaptation" poll in 2023. The series, alongside 10 Things I Want to Do Before I Turn 40, won the BL Comic Prize at NTT Solmare's Digital Comic Awards 2024.
