= Yokohama Station SF =

Japanese light novel series

- First light novel volume cover

横浜駅SF (Yokohama Eki SF)
- Genre: Science fiction
- Novel series
- Written by: Yuba Isukari
- Published by: Kakuyomu
- Original run: January 11, 2016 – March 31, 2017
- Light novel
- Written by: Yuba Isukari
- Illustrated by: Tatsuyuki Tanaka
- Published by: Fujimi Shobo
- English publisher: NA: Yen Press
- Imprint: Kadokawa Books
- Published: December 24, 2016
- Volumes: 1
- Manga
- Written by: Yuba Isukari
- Illustrated by: Gonbe Shinkawa
- Published by: Kadokawa Shoten
- English publisher: NA: Yen Press
- Imprint: Kadokawa Comics A
- Magazine: Young Ace Up
- Original run: December 27, 2016 – October 25, 2018
- Volumes: 3
- Light novel

Yokohama Station SF National
- Written by: Yuba Isukari
- Illustrated by: Tatsuyuki Tanaka
- Published by: Fujimi Shobo
- English publisher: NA: Yen Press
- Imprint: Kadokawa Books
- Published: August 10, 2017
- Volumes: 1

Yokohama Station SF (横浜駅SF, Yokohama Eki SF) is a Japanese light novel written by Yuba Isukari and illustrated by Tatsuyuki Tanaka. It was initially serialized as a web novel published on Kadokawa Corporation's Kakuyomu website between January 2016 and March 2017. A single volume was published under Fujimi Shobo's Kadokawa Books imprint in December 2016. A sequel titled Yokohama Station SF National was published in August 2017. A manga adaptation illustrated by Gonbe Shinkawa was serialized on Kadokawa Shoten's Young Ace Up website between December 2016 and October 2018.

== Synopsis ==
Approximately 200 years have passed since the Winter War, and most of Honshu has been covered by the proliferation of Yokohama Stations. Hiroto Mishima, who was born and raised outside of Yokohama Station, obtains a "18 Ticket" from a man associated with the Kiseru Alliance, allowing him to enter Yokohama Station for five days, and heads inside the station.

As he continues his journey, meeting spies sent from Hokkaido and the leader of the Kiseru Alliance, Hiroto learns the truth about the origins of Yokohama Station and makes the decision to put an end to it. By the time Hiroto returns to his hometown, where he learned agriculture in preparation for a life without Yokohama Station, a year has passed since he set out on his journey.

== Media ==
=== Light novel ===
Written by Yuba Isukari, Yokahama Station SF was initially serialized on Kadokawa Corporation's Kakuyomu website from January 11, 2016, to March 31, 2017. A single volume with illustrations by Tatsuyuki Tanaka was released under Fujimi Shobo's Kadokawa Books light novel imprint on December 24, 2016. A sequel light novel titled Yokohama Station SF National was released on August 10, 2017.

The novels are licensed in English by Yen Press.

No.	Original release date	Original ISBN	North American release date	North American ISBN
1	December 24, 2016	978-4-04-072157-6	March 30, 2021	978-1-97-531951-9
1. "A Clockwork Ticket"; 2. "20,000 Kilometers Inside the Station"; 3. "Do Androids Dream of Electric Rails?"; 4. "Or All Seas with the Stations"; 5. "Code of the Expander"; 6. "Turnstile Organ"; 7. Epilogue
2	August 10, 2017	978-4-04-072365-5	June 28, 2022	978-1-97-534417-7
1. Prologue; 2. "Seto Insland Sea & Kyoto: A Harsh Mistress"; 3. "Gunma: Self-Replicating Engine"; 4. "Kumamoto: Confectionary 451"; 5. "Iwate: Scanners Live in Your Brain"; 6. "Inside City Guide"

=== Manga ===
A manga adaptation illustrated by Gonbe Shinkawa was serialized on Kadokawa Shoten's Young Ace Up website from December 27, 2016, to October 25, 2018. The manga's chapters were collected into three tankōbon volumes released from August 10, 2017, to November 2, 2018.

The manga adaptation is also licensed by Yen Press.

No.	Original release date	Original ISBN	North American release date	North American ISBN
1	August 10, 2017	978-4-04-105916-6	May 23, 2023	978-1-97-535089-5
1. "A Clockwork Ticket I"; 2. "A Clockwork Ticket 2"; 3. "20,000 Kilometers Inside the Station I"; 4. "20,000 Kilometers Inside the Station II"; 5. "Do Androids Dream of Electric Rails? I"
2	March 2, 2018	978-4-04-106495-5	August 22, 2023	978-1-97-535091-8
6. "Do Androids Dream of Electric Rails? II"; 7. "Do Androids Dream of Electric Rails? III"; 8. "Or All the Seas with Stations (Intro)"; 9. "Or All the Seas with Stations (Process)"; 10. "Or All the Seas with Stations (Output)"
3	November 2, 2018	978-4-04-107294-3	November 21, 2023	978-1-97-535093-2
1. "Or All the Seas with Stations (Contemplation)"; 2. "Code of the Expander I"; 3. "Code of the Expander II"; 4. "Turnstile Organ I"; 5. "Turnstile Organ II"; 6. Epilogue; Supplement: "JR Fukuoka, Operation Honshu Landfall"

== Reception ==
The series won the Grand Prize in the Science Fiction category at the 1st Kakuyomu Web Novel Contest in 2016. The first novel was ranked eighth in the tankōbon category in the 2018 edition of Takarajimasha's Kono Light Novel ga Sugoi! guidebook.
