= Promotional video =

Use of video

In video production, a promotional video is marketing or advertising:

== Arts, media and entertainment ==
- Promotional recording, an audio or video recording distributed to publicize a recording
- Trailer (promotion), a commercial advertisement for a feature film
- Music video, a short film that integrates a song with imagery

== Corporate use ==
- Corporate video, non-advertisement media created for and commissioned by an organization

== Personal use ==
- Video resume, a recording used to promote a jobseeker
- Promotional dating video, a video dating recording made to find a romantic partner
