= Playing Death Games to Put Food on the Table =

2022 Japanese light novel series and its adaptations

- First light novel volume cover, featuring Yuki

死亡遊戯で飯を食う (Shibōyūgi de Meshi o Kuu)
- Genre: Action
- Light novel
- Written by: Yūshi Ukai
- Illustrated by: Nekometaru
- Published by: Media Factory
- English publisher: NA: Yen Press
- Imprint: MF Bunko J
- Original run: November 25, 2022 – present
- Volumes: 10
- Manga
- Written by: Yūshi Ukai
- Illustrated by: Banzai Kotobuki Daienkai
- Published by: Kadokawa Shoten
- English publisher: NA: Yen Press
- Imprint: Kadokawa Comics A
- Magazine: Comp Ace
- Original run: April 26, 2023 – present
- Volumes: 6
- Anime television series

Shiboyugi: Playing Death Games to Put Food on the Table
- Directed by: Souta Ueno
- Written by: Rintarou Ikeda
- Music by: Junichi Matsumoto
- Studio: Studio Deen
- Licensed by: Crunchyroll (streaming); Netflix (streaming); SEA: Muse Communication
- Original network: Tokyo MX, BS NTV, TVh, TVA, TVQ, ABC TV, AT-X, tbc, WOWOW Prime
- Original run: January 7, 2026 – March 18, 2026
- Episodes: 11
- Anime film

Shiboyugi: Playing Death Games to Put Food on the Table – 44: Cloudy Beach
- Directed by: Souta Ueno
- Written by: Rintarou Ikeda
- Music by: Junichi Matsumoto
- Studio: Studio Deen
- Licensed by: Crunchyroll (streaming); Netflix (streaming); SEA: Muse Communication
- Released: July 10, 2026
- Runtime: 89 minutes
- icon

Playing Death Games to Put Food on the Table (Japanese: 死亡遊戯で飯を食う, Hepburn: Shibōyūgi de Meshi o Kuu) is a Japanese light novel series written by Yūshi Ukai and illustrated by Nekometaru. It began publication under Media Factory's MF Bunko J light novel imprint in November 2022. The series follows Yuki, a death game player who treats the games like a job, and her journey to break a record by surviving 99 games.

Ukai wrote the series after deciding to create a story focusing around themes of life, death, and associated emotions. The debut volume won an Excellence Award at the 2022 MF Bunko J Light Novel Newcomer Awards.

A manga adaptation illustrated by Banzai Kotobuki Daienkai began serialization in Kadokawa Shoten's magazine Comp Ace in April 2023. An anime television series adaptation produced by Studio Deen aired from January to March 2026. A sequel anime film adapting the light novel's Cloudy Beach arc premiered in Japanese theaters on July 10, 2026. A new sequel has been announced.

== Synopsis ==
The series is set in a dystopian society where the elite create and televise death games. Most players willingly participate to win cash prizes, but others are forced to do so. To make games sustainable, only about a third of participants tend to die in each game. Their blood is modified such that it turns into a cotton-like substance upon contact with air, and those who survive have their injuries healed or replaced with cybernetics by the organization operating the games.

The story revolves around Yuki, a 17-year-old girl who participates in death games as a career. Finding the rest of society mundane by comparison, Yuki's goal is to set the death game survival record by surviving 99 games. Throughout the series, Yuki takes part in games that require her to escape, survive, or compete against other players. Though kind at heart, using her expertise and natural leadership skills to help as many of the other participants survive, she ruthlessly prioritizes her own survival when the situation calls for it. As she pursues her goal, she sometimes finds herself unsure of why she so desperately wants to achieve it.

== Characters ==
=== Main ===
Yuki (幽鬼) / Yuki Sorimachi (反町 友樹, Sorimachi Yūki)
Voiced by: Yuki Nakashima (PV), Chiyuki Miura (anime) (Japanese); Suzie Yeung (English)
A 17-year-old veteran player who participates primarily for her own entertainment, finding ordinary life boring and wanting to set a record by surviving 99 death games. Calm and composed, she is actually far kinder than most veterans, going out of her way to protect her fellow players, even if she only claims to do so to curry favors. However, she can be ruthless and is willing to kill people should the situation demand it.

=== Maiden Race ===
Yuki's 1st game: an obstacle course on a track field.

Setsuna (雪名)
Voiced by: Yukiyo Fujii
Yuki's private agent, who transports her to and from games. Though she maintains a cold, businesswoman-like demeanor, she has occasionally shown genuine care for Yuki. She was once a suicidal newbie player who participated in Yuki's first game, Maiden Race. However, after seeing Yuki utterly dominate the game, along with nearly dying herself, she regained her will to live.
Kanade (花奏)
Shizuku's younger sister, a newbie player who got tricked into participating. Throughout the game, she is a nervous wreck who holds back the other players, with Shizuku needing to help her keep it together. She gets killed by one of the obstacles.
Shizuku (静久)
Kanade's older sister, a newbie player who got tricked into participating alongside the former. Throughout the game, she attempts to keep Kanade safe. As a result, after Kanade dies, she snaps and attempts to kill Setsuna, only to be killed herself.

=== Candle Woods ===
Yuki's 9th game: players are divided into two groups—"Bunnies" and "Stumps"—with the Bunnies needing to survive in a forest for a week as the Stumps hunt them.

Hakushi (白士) / Manami Shiratsukawa (白津川 真実, Shiratsukawa Manami)
Voiced by: Shizuka Itō (Japanese); Dawn M. Bennett (English)
Yuki's mentor and a 96-game veteran player who got slotted into the Bunnies. She is widely considered the greatest living death game player, with Yuki's goal of completing ninety-nine games originally being hers. Though sustaining grievous wounds, she survives Candle Woods thanks to body modification that she performed on herself. However, she opts to retire after Yuki, who believes her to be deceased, chooses to carry on her legacy by completing ninety-nine games in her place.
Airi (藍里) / Airi Hitose (一瀬 藍里, Hitose Airi)
Voiced by: Yume Miyamoto (Japanese); Erica Mendez (English)
A newbie player who got slotted into the Stumps. She survives Candle Woods, quietly fulfilling her kill quota while the veteran players are occupied with each other. Afterward, despite wanting to retire from death games, she is forced to continue playing to support her family. After becoming a successful veteran, she once again participates alongside Yuki in Cloudy Beach her 33rd game, which she also survives.
Sumiyaka (墨家)
Voiced by: Ayana Taketatsu (Japanese); Rebecca Wang (English)
An acquaintance of Yuki, a twenty-nine-game veteran player who got slotted into the Bunnies. Kyara kills her during her rampage.
Moegi (萌黄)
Voiced by: Natsuko Abe (Japanese); Jenny Yokobori (English)
A three-game veteran player and one of Kyara's protégés who participates to gain courage. Being the only experienced Stump, she quickly assumes leadership and teaches her teammates how to kill. Upon realizing Kyara is participating in this game, she hurriedly attempts to complete her kill quota, only to be killed by Yuki.
Kyara (伽羅)
Voiced by: Rina Honnizumi (Japanese); Anairis Quiñones (English)
A ten-game veteran who got slotted in the Bunnies. She is a psychopath who participates to satisfy her murderous urges by killing her fellow players, except for those she takes a liking to and trains as her protégés. Unsatisfied with the game's rules, she eventually kills a Stump, puts on their clothes and begins indiscriminately slaughtering both Bunnies and Stumps alike, until Yuki finally kills her.

=== Scrap Building ===
Yuki's 10th game: escaping from a booby-trapped polling station before time runs out.

Mishiro (御城)
Voiced by: Rio Tsuchiya (Japanese); Allegra Clark (English)
A nine-time veteran player who participates primarily to satisfy her ego, causing her to develop a one-sided rivalry with Yuki after the latter proves herself the better player. She survives Scrap Building and goes on to become a successful player, training multiple protégés. In the end, Yuki kills her when they face each other again in Yuki's thirtieth death game, Golden Bath.
Keito (毛糸)
Voiced by: Wakana Maruoka (Japanese); Riley Fussenegger (English)
A six-time veteran player who claims to have a talent for determining a game's survivors. In truth, she is an opportunist who allies with whoever can help her survive. She survives Scrap Building and later plays alongside Yuki again in another death game, Mossy Grove, and once again makes it through.
Kotoha (言葉)
Voiced by: Shion Wakayama (Japanese); Xanthe Huynh (English)
A five-time veteran player whose primary asset is her intelligence. Tired of modern society, she participates in death games to save up enough money to become a hikikomori. During the game, her legs get blown off, but Yuki saves her, and she survives. Afterward, she begins using a wheelchair and retires from death games, becoming a recruiter instead.
Chie (智恵)
Voiced by: Rui Tanabe (Japanese); Kimoy Lee (English)
A four-time veteran player who describes herself as a jack-of-all-trades. Though an opportunist who allies herself with whoever can help her survive, she is also a genuinely kind and sociable person. She dies after losing the game's final challenge—a vote that kills whoever gets a plurality—getting singled out for contributing nothing to her teammates.

=== Ghost House ===
Yuki's 28th game: escaping from a dollhouse-like mansion before it burns down.

Beniya (紅野)
Voiced by: Mutsumi Tamura (Japanese); Morgan Berry (English)
A rookie player who participates to settle her business debts. Throughout the game, she grows sympathetic toward fellow player Momono and helps her make it out. She survives the game.
Momono (桃乃)
Voiced by: Rina Kawaguchi (Japanese); Kayli Mills (English)
A rookie player who was tricked into participating after accepting a fake job offer. A nervous wreck throughout the game, she garners sympathy from fellow player Beniya, who helps her make it through. She survives the game.
Kokuto (黒糖, Kokutō)
Voiced by: Haruka Satō (Japanese); Sky Santacruz (English)
A one-time player who participates for the prize money, being too lazy to get an ordinary job, and a self-described opportunist who sides with whoever can help her survive. She is the first player to die, killed by a booby-trap.
Aoi (青井)
Voiced by: Rena Motomura (Japanese); Brianna Knickerbocker (English)
A rookie player who participates due to struggling to find an ordinary job. She is the second player to die, killed by giant saws during a challenge to unlock restraints after the other players fail to give her the key in time.
Kinko (金子)
Voiced by: Inori Minase (Japanese); Michelle Marie (English)
A rookie player who participates to pay off her father's debt. Throughout the game, she becomes guilty over the other players' deaths, even offering herself up so her teammates can beat a challenge, but Yuki convinces her to continue. She is the third and final player to die, killed by Yuki in the game's final challenge: kill three players to unlock the exit.

=== Golden Bath ===
Yuki's 30th death game: escaping from a bathhouse by stealing keys from other players.

Azuma (吾妻)
Voiced by: Haruka Oribe (Japanese); Tiana Camacho (English)
A seven-game veteran who participates due to her lack of femininity, struggling to fit into normal society. She becomes the leader of a group of players whom Yuki later joins. She is killed when her and Yuki's plan to charge the exit fails, getting drowned by Mishiro's team camping there.
Riko (狸狐)
Voiced by: Sumire Morohoshi (Japanese); Sarah Anne Williams (English)
An eight-game veteran player whose body has been mostly replaced with prosthetics following injuries in a previous game, granting her superhuman strength. While initially participating due to being suicidal, she continued playing out of loyalty to Mishiro after the latter saved her during a game. Following Mishiro's death at Yuki's hands, she attempts to avenge her, only to be killed herself by the game's final obstacle: an electrified floor (automated turrets in the anime).

=== One Fine Day ===
Yuki's 40th game: survive a whole day against murderous mascots at an amusement park.

Maguma (真熊) / Sayuri Shaguma (赭熊 早百合, Shaguma Sayuri)
Voiced by: Aino Shimada
A 39-game veteran player with a tall and muscular physique who generally works alone. She survives One Fine Day and once again plays alongside Yuki in Cloudy Beach, which she also survives.
Essay (永世)
Voiced by: Anna Nagase
A 47-game veteran player known for her intelligence. She survives One Fine Day and once again plays alongside Yuki in Cloudy Beach. Although initially appearing to be Cloudy Beach's first casualty, she is later revealed to be the game's "murderer", having faked her own death by modifying her own body to survive even fatal injuries. In the end, Yuki kills her by disassembling her body piece by piece.

=== Cloudy Beach ===
Yuki's 44th game: survive on a deserted island for a week whilst a murderer hiding amongst the players attempts to kill 3 players before time runs out.

Mozuku (海雲)
Voiced by: Hikaru Tono
A 9-game veteran player who is generally considered the game's weakest participant. Despite this, when the murderer attacks her, she uses a self-made stun gun to scare them off, and she survives the game.
Koyomi (古詠)
Voiced by: Yukari Tamura
A 20-game veteran player from Hakushi's generation who participates whenever she needs money. She is known for her strong intuition, which helps her avoid dangerous situations. She survives the game but retires after concluding that she cannot compete with current players.
Mitsuba (蜜羽)
Voiced by: Riko Akechi
A 30-game veteran player and one of Mishiro's protégés. However, upon meeting Yuki, she reveals that she holds no interest in avenging her mentor. She is later ambushed and killed by the murderer.
Hizumi (日澄)
Voiced by: Konomi Inagaki
An elementary-school-aged veteran player and one of Kyara's protégés. Constantly giving off a murderous aura, she is a top suspect for being the murderer throughout the game, but later gets killed by the real murderer herself.

== Production ==
=== Light novels ===
==== Conception ====
Yūshi Ukai, the writer of the light novels, composed the first volume after he had quit his part-time job and was struggling to "make any progress" in his life. He became interested in the death game genre because he felt his emotions spilling over into his writing and saw the genre as an outlet for them. After not finding success with his other works, he grew "more and more disturbed until [he] wrote this disturbing story". Ukai usually worked on the novels at night, drinking coffee and writing until he was exhausted.

Ukai wanted to explore the psychological aspects of a world completely focused around life and death. He remarked that the narrative was comparable to other books about working at a job, and that the story was simply a special case of this. He decided to have Yuki, the protagonist, treat the death games like a profession to justify why she continued playing.

Several inspirations for the work were named by Ukai; among them were the light novel series Iriya no Sora, UFO no Natsu and the game franchise Ace Attorney. He often read classic literature, such as The Old Man and the Sea, while working on the novels.

==== Development ====
According to Ukai, he wanted to use common stylistic conventions of light novels to explore a less popular genre. He felt that the rise of works such as Spy Classroom and The Detective Is Already Dead indicated that unique stories were becoming a trend. Since he struggled to read books until high school, he tried to make the story accessible with his younger self in mind.

Yuki's character was partly based on Ukai's own personality. He aimed to characterize Yuki as someone who is comfortable with deadly situations and treats the games like a job. For example, Yuki often expresses banal thoughts regarding the food or clothing during a game, which is meant to show how mundane the games are from her perspective. Ukai also portrayed Yuki as having a neutral attitude towards others, and emphasized that one of the work's themes is not judging people as good or evil solely on first appearances.

Ukai took inspiration from the manga Are You a Werewolf?, itself based on the social deduction game Werewolf, for the characters' costumes. He sought to use the format of a light novel, which includes illustrations, to show the players in various outfits.

==== Release ====
Ukai submitted the manuscript to the MF Bunko J Light Novel Awards, but did not expect his work to be recognized, since he felt his story had gone too far. He was surprised when he learned that he had won the Newcomer Prize. Although he called his story highly unusual, he remarked that this uniqueness may have allowed the work to stand out.

Shortly after winning the Newcomer Prize, the first volume was published by MF Bunko J. After publication, Ukai described himself as being in a state of emotional suspense, since he was not sure how long the success of his series would last. Additionally, he had not planned the story beyond the first volume. Nevertheless, he was pleased that his work had been received much more positively than he had anticipated.

=== Anime ===
==== Adaptation ====
The editor for the light novels had worked with Studio Deen producer Takaaki Kayama on the anime adaptation of Days with My Stepsister, and suggested that Kayama consider adapting Playing Death Games to Put Food on the Table as well. Kayama was initially hesitant, as he felt that the story's genre and narrative might not translate well into animation. However, after reading the second volume, he was impressed by the work's portrayal of human nature and relationships under extreme situations, and decided to pursue an anime adaptation.

Kayama noted that the original work contained some lighthearted or comedic elements, which he significantly toned down in the anime, both as a deliberate choice and as a natural consequence of focusing on Yuki's emotions. He described the story as being merciless, with sympathetic characters at risk of elimination at any moment.

Unlike the light novels, the anime does not immediately reveal Yuki's motivation. This was done through both directorial choices, such as the portrayal of Yuki's inner thoughts, and narrative structuring, such as reordering the source material. Furthermore, Souta Ueno, the director of the anime adaptation, added an original scene where Yuki dries Kinko's hair, which was meant to present additional depth in Yuki's character.

==== Development ====
The premiere episode was 60 minutes long, roughly twice the length of a typical episode. Kayama chose this format to depict an entire death game in a single episode, allowing viewers to understand what the story was about. By committing to an ending which portrayed Yuki as a morally ambiguous protagonist, Kayama sought to distinguish the anime from traditional works in the genre where the protagonist remains innocent.

Though the story features a varied cast of characters, Ueno tried to have each of them impact Yuki in some way. While giving instructions to the voice actors, he referenced the final scene of the book Fahrenheit 451, where each survivor finds a reason to live; similarly, he wanted every character in the story to have some motivation for living on, which influences Yuki's mindset as she interacts with them. In addition, Ueno sought to portray Yuki as a complex and often contradictory character to emphasize that she has emotional weaknesses and is more than just an unfeeling protagonist.

Regarding the themes of the work, Kayama stated that its extreme setting was designed to allow for portraying the unique emotions that arise under such circumstances. Similarly, Ueno emphasized that the background of a death game was meant to allow for hope. The two also noted that the series was meant to have viewers to interpret many details themselves.

==== Visual design ====
Ueno stated that the light novels' atmosphere reminded him of the ballet dancers in Edgar Degas's paintings, who often lived harsh lives behind their public appearances. In directing the animation, Ueno sought to portray the characters from a removed perspective using distant camera shots, avoiding exclusive focus on direct emotional reactions. While close-up shots were rendered in detail, more distant shots used flatter visuals, creating deliberate contrasts as an aesthetic effect.

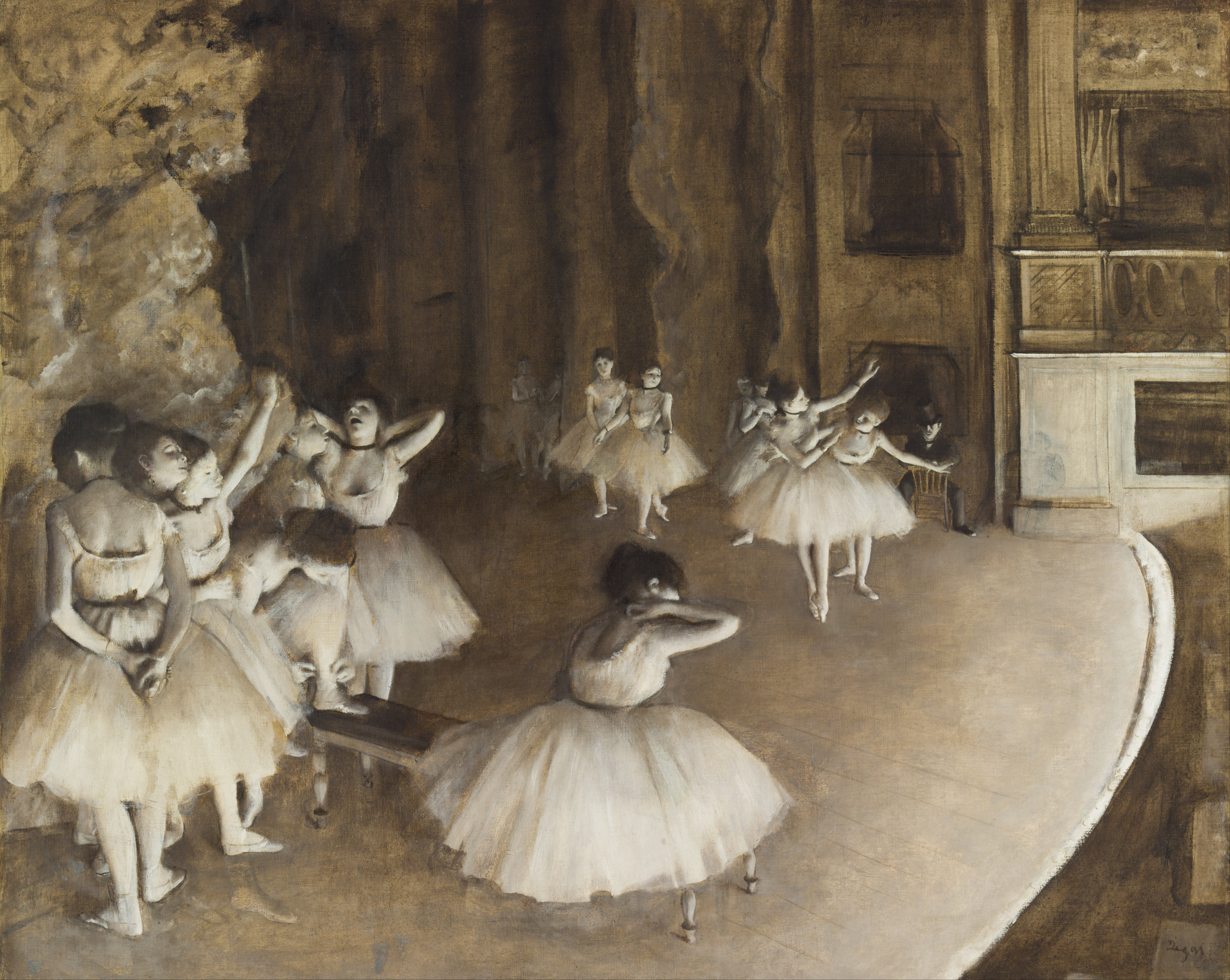
Ballet Rehearsal on Stage, 1874, Edgar Degas

The concept artist, Hewa, worked closely with Ueno on the series' visual design, particularly the settings. Hewa constructed the settings as 3D models to simulate camera placement, and the art team then worked on the background. Kayama noted that almost every part of the final production was built from Hewa's initial concept art.

Kayama praised Eri Osada's work on the character designs, which were similar in intricacy to the light novels' drawings by Nekometaru. Particular detail was given to the characters' eyes, especially Yuki's heterochromatic ones. Ueno digitally composited microscopic photographs of minerals to create the animation of the eyes, and their reflects were drawn differently in every cut.

For one scene in a shower room, Ueno had characters be soaked in water so that their clothes clung to their bodies. He explained that their human silhouettes were meant to emphasize them as living people amidst a death game. In contrast, for character deaths, he made the scenes brief, since he wanted them to feel realistic rather than dramatized. He took inspiration from the film Cure, directed by Kiyoshi Kurosawa, for the style of those sequences.

The series uses a CinemaScope aspect ratio, which is rare in modern anime. This aspect ratio leaves black bars near the top and bottom of the screen, which were intended to express the dual feelings of isolation and instability caused by the empty space.

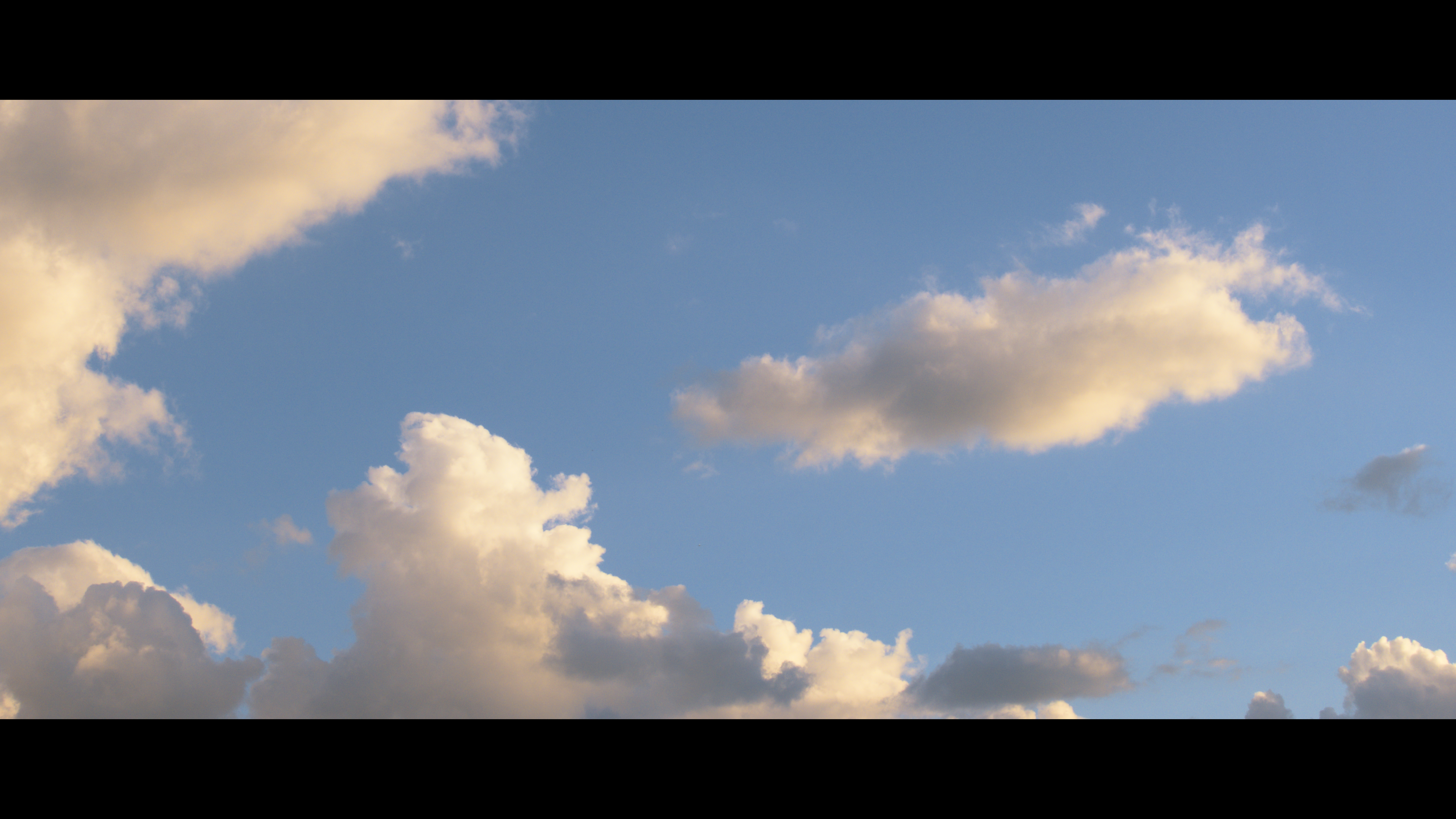
A CinemaScope aspect ratio leaves black bars on the top and bottom of the screen.

==== Sound design ====
Yuki's monologues were composed in a unique way; Chiyuki Miura, Yuki's Japanese voice actress, recorded the same lines twice, once with first-person pronouns ("I") and once with third-person pronouns ("Yuki"). The recordings were then layered, sometimes with one emphasized more than the other, to convey Yuki's tendency to view the world from a detached perspective.

Kayama had enjoyed the music of composer Junichi Matsumoto in a previous documentary called A Holiday in the Ruins, and wanted the soundtrack to naturally blend in with the story. To this end, Noriyoshi Konuma, the anime's sound director, aimed to make the distinction between background music and sound effects as ambiguous as possible, while Matsumoto would often include footstep sounds within the music tracks.

For a scene where one of the players dies, the song "Que Sera, Sera (Whatever Will Be, Will Be)" plays. Ueno felt that the cruelty of having the song sung at that moment was central to the themes of the story.

==== Voice acting ====
Many voice actors auditioned for Yuki's role. Miura was ultimately selected for her ability to convey a deliberately restrained emotional range, which had a significant influence on Ueno; parts of the storyboards for the second half of the anime were adjusted in response to her performance. Miura found her role challenging, and used the full recording session for the premiere episode to perfect her lines. She described her approach to her role as trying to be ghost-like.

Miura noted that her voice's expression was subdued because Yuki's lines are close to a whispering level. As a result, she tried to pay attention to her breathing between lines. In addition, scenes were typically recorded in long takes, rather than short excerpts, so Miura had to stay in character for almost the whole recording time.

== Themes and analysis ==
=== Death and agency ===
Ukai explained that the idea for the series came from his despondency. During a period of depression, he fixated on the idea that "every human slowly approaches death". In terms of this shared inevitability, he felt that the only agency available to a hopeless person was the ability to die on their own terms. He concluded that "deciding on how to die is the same as deciding on how to live", which inspired by him to create a story focusing on death games in which players participate voluntarily.

As a result of this premise, several critics have regarded the story as being a subversion of the death game genre. Iori Kanzaki, author of That Summer is Saturated, argued that it differs from similar works because most characters participate freely, thus offering them a unique form of agency; he wrote that "although their lives are being toyed with ... they are actually the ones in control". Similarly, Takemachi, author of Spy Classroom, opined that that the work "completely shuns the common tropes" of the genre by portraying Yuki as having "no earnest reason" to participate beyond her own desires.

=== Moral ambiguity ===
Analyzing Yuki's character, Yuuki Shasendou, author of An Illness that Leads to Love, described her as an "outlandish protagonist" who "lives according to her own rules". She felt that this characterization allowed Yuki's actions to be easily grasped despite her motivations otherwise possessing little meaning to the reader. Similarly, Takemachi regarded Yuki as having a mindset that he was "unable to understand", yet characterized this "absurdity" as being "extremely appealing". Kanzaki contended that despite Yuki's calm nature, she has a "passionate resolve" for the games themselves.

Ryuichi Taniguchi of Da Vinci Web opined that because Yuki does not challenge the system of the death games, she cannot be considered a just character. By portraying Yuki as morally ambiguous, Taniguchi felt that the story achieves an unsettling effect. In contrast, Haruki Kuou, author of Liar, Liar, stated that Yuki was someone the reader can "continuously root for", but only because she is the sole character who can be expected to survive the story.

=== Violence and competition ===
The story features an unusual visual portrayal of violent imagery by using a plot device (known as "Preservation Treatment"), which alters players' blood such that its appearance and even texture changes upon leaving the body. Nigojū, author of The Detective Is Already Dead, held that this allows the author to "leave shocking scenes to the reader's imagination", while Kanzaki argued that it "tones down the image of 'death'" and even "give[s] death a hint of charm". Kanzaki further suggested that by avoiding a "grotesque" depiction of death despite it being a "selling point" of death games, the work embraces genre conventions without allowing them to overshadow the story itself.

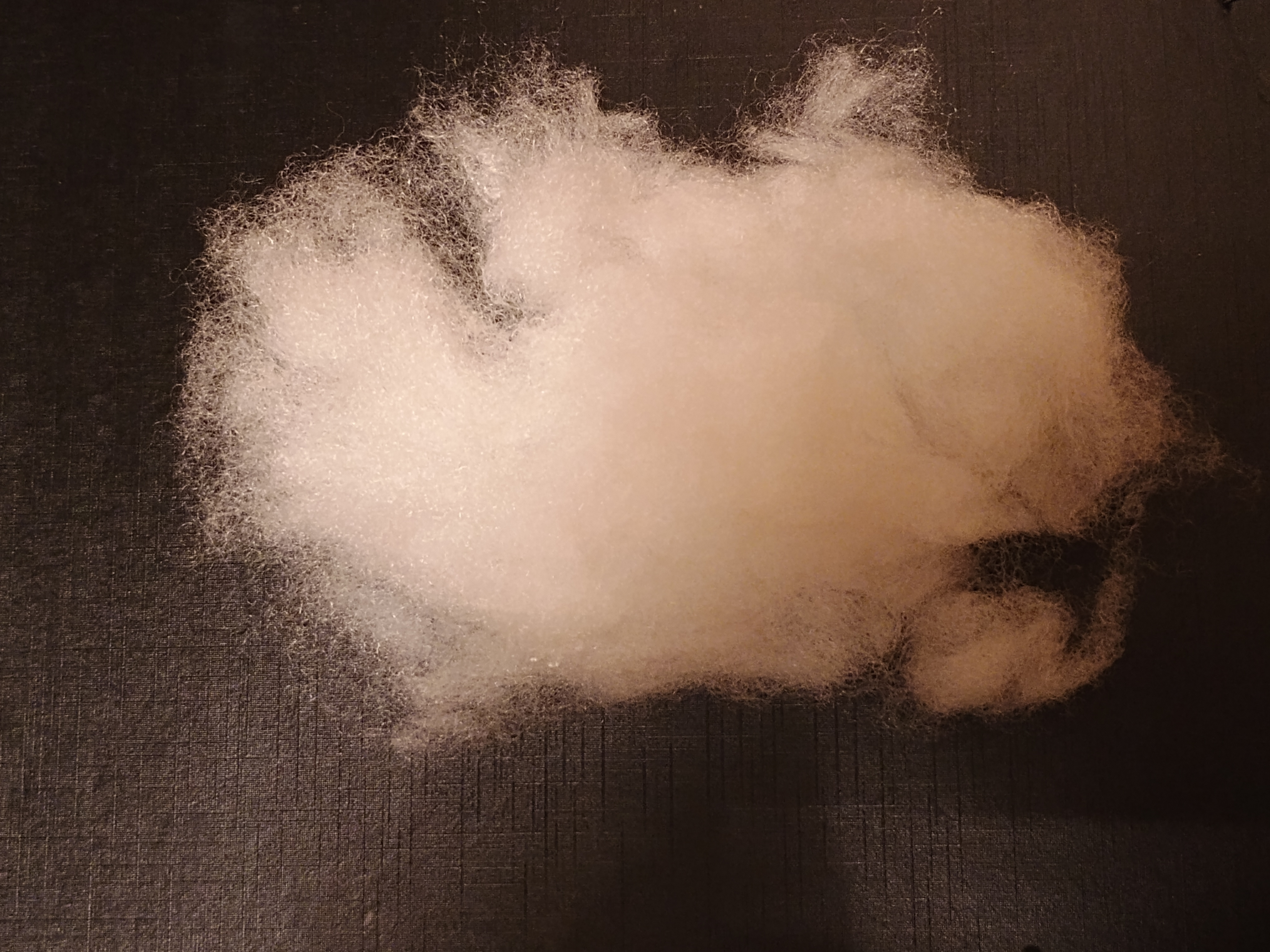
Blood becomes white fluff that resembles polyfill.

Ghost Mikawa, author of My Friend's Little Sister Has It In for Me!, focused on the series's overarching themes. He regarded the work as addressing "familiar topics in everyday life" despite its appearance, and opined that the characters are driven by "commonplace emotions". Comparing the death games to typical games or sports, he identified familiar feelings such as the desire to win and the refusal to lose, as well as carelessness and inexperience. Mikawa concluded that the "most engrossing element" of the story lies not in its exploration of human nature or its entertainment value, but rather its portrayal of relatable themes in an abstract setting.

Taniguchi maintained that the story's themes of competition are relevant to today, particularly regarding the idea of prioritizing profit over emotions to survive in society. He contended that through its genre, the story successfully portrays the mindset needed for survival at all costs.

=== Entertainment value ===
The work's controversial elements have been widely discussed. Yozora Fuzuno, author of Even If All Love Fades noted that light novel writers typically make "calculated decisions", such as including fan service and sympathetic characters, to attract readers' attention. He proclaimed that the story "does away" with those decisions and instead was solely intended to be "consider[ed] entertaining". From this perspective, he suggested that what some critics called the work's "monstrous" nature was simply a natural result of this approach. Nigojū offered a different opinion, asserting that certain elements, such as the restrained depiction of violence, were deliberately designed to appeal to a larger audience, and that the work's divisive nature was therefore inherent to the story itself.

Caitlin Moore of Anime News Network argued that the story addresses a dual audience, both within the narrative and within the real world. She observed that "by the simple act of viewing, we ourselves become participants", and contended that this framing is either meant to evoke reflection or sadness in the audience.

== Media ==
=== Light novel ===
The light novels of Playing Death Games to Put Food on the Table are written by Yūshi Ukai and illustrated by Nekometaru. The series began publication under Media Factory's MF Bunko J light novel imprint on November 25, 2022. Ten volumes have been released as of June 25, 2026.

During its panel at Anime Expo 2023, Yen Press announced that it had licensed the series for English-language release.

No.	Original release date	Original ISBN	North American release date	North American ISBN
1	November 25, 2022	978-4-04-681937-6	June 18, 2024	978-1-9753-9261-1
1. "Ghost House (#28)"; 2. "Candle Woods (#9)"; 3. "A Lifetime Job"; Commentary: Nigoju; Commentary: Takemachi
2	January 25, 2023	978-4-04-682109-6	October 15, 2024	979-8-8554-0087-8
1. "Scrap Building (#10)"; 2. "Golden Bath (#30)"; 3. "Crimson Lake"; Commentary: Haruki Kuou; Commentary: Ghost Mikawa
3	April 25, 2023	978-4-04-682405-9	February 18, 2025	979-8-8554-0089-2
1. "One Fine Day (#40)"; 2. "Cloudy Beach (#44) Day 1"; 3. "Cloudy Beach (#44) Day 2"; 4. "Cloudy Beach (#44) Day 3"; 5. "Cloudy Beach (#44) Day 4"; 6. "Leaving the Front Line"; Commentary: Iori Kanzaki; Commentary: Yuuki Shasendou; Commentary: Yozora Fuyuno
4	August 25, 2023	978-4-04-682765-4	August 12, 2025	979-8-8554-0091-5
1. "Cloudy Beach: Day 8"; 2. "Schoolmate (#47.5)"; 3. "City Scenario (#44.5)"; 4. "Halloween Night (#45)"; 5. "Lost and Found"
5	December 25, 2023	978-4-04-683149-1	February 10, 2026	979-8-8554-0110-3
1. "Flickering Candleflame"; 2. "Teacher's Melancholy (#47.5)"; 3. "Royal Palace (#62)"; 4. "Coming Full Circle"
6	April 25, 2024	978-4-04-683544-4	September 8, 2026	979-8-8554-2432-4
1. "Head-to-Head"; 2. "Maiden Race (#1)"; 3. "Snow Room (#62.5)"; 4. "Postwar Process"
7	September 25, 2024	978-4-04-684006-6	—	—
8	February 25, 2025	978-4-04-684556-6	—	—
9	January 23, 2026	978-4-04-685603-6	—	—
10	June 25, 2026	978-4-04-660162-9	—	—
11	December 25, 2026	978-4-04-660641-9	—	—

=== Manga ===
A manga adaptation illustrated by Banzai Kotobuki Daienkai began serialization in Kadokawa Shoten's seinen manga magazine Comp Ace on April 26, 2023. The manga's chapters have been collected in six tankōbon volumes as of July 2026.

In February 2026, Yen Press announced that they had licensed the manga for English publication, with the first volume set to release in August later in the year.

No.	Original release date	Original ISBN	English release date	English ISBN
1	December 26, 2023	978-4-04-114456-5	August 25, 2026	979-8-8554-2087-6
1. "Ghost House 1"; 2. "Ghost House 2"; 3. "Ghost House 3"; 4. "Ghost House 4"; 5. "Ghost House 5"; 6. "Candle Woods 1"; Bonus: "Ghost House Player Profiles"
2	July 25, 2024	978-4-04-115036-8	December 15, 2026	979-8-8554-2089-0
3	February 26, 2025	978-4-04-115861-6	—	—
4	September 24, 2025	978-4-04-116476-1	—	—
5	January 23, 2026	978-4-04-117080-9	—	—
6	July 23, 2026	978-4-04-117662-7	—	—

=== Anime ===
An anime television series adaptation was announced in September 2024. It is produced by Studio Deen and directed by Souta Ueno, with Rintarou Ikeda handling series composition, Eri Osada designing the characters, and Junichi Matsumoto composing the music. The series aired from January 7 to March 18, 2026, on Tokyo MX and other networks. The opening theme song is "¬Ersterbend", performed by Lin from Madkid, and the ending theme song is "Inori" (祈り; lit. 'Prayer'), performed by Chiai Fujikawa. It is streaming globally on Crunchyroll and Netflix under the title Shiboyugi: Playing Death Games to Put Food on the Table, while Muse Communication licensed the series in Southeast Asia.

A sequel anime film adapting the light novel's Cloudy Beach arc was announced at the AnimeJapan event on March 18, 2026. It released in Japanese theaters with a limited 2-week release date on July 10, 2026 via Animec.

On November 22, 2026, during MF Bunko J's "Fall School Festival 2026" livestream event, a new sequel for the television series was announced.

==== Episodes ====
No.	Title	Directed by	Written by	Storyboarded by	Original release date
Ghost House
1	"All You Need Is ----"	Yui Kamura, Taro Kubo, Masahiko Watanabe & Matsuo Asami	Rintarou Ikeda	Souta Ueno	January 7, 2026
Twenty-seven death game veteran Yuki must escape a booby-trapped mansion before it burns down alongside five newbie players: Aoi and Kokuto, who want the prize money; Kinko and Beniya, who are in debt; and Momono, who is forced to participate. After a trap kills Kokuto, the remaining girls are forced into a challenge where they take turns undoing restraints before giant saws kill them, resulting in Aoi's death after they waste time fighting over the key. Next, they must use an elevator with a weight limit. Blaming herself for Aoi's death, Kinko offers to stay behind, but Yuki talks her out of it, arguing that the petite girl leaving will not put them below the limit. Instead, Yuki convinces everyone to amputate a leg, which lowers their weight enough for them to reach the exit. However, they find that three players must have died for it to open. Out of options, Yuki kills Kinko and exits the mansion. The next day, after waking up at her apartment with her leg reattached, Yuki reminisces about the victims and reiterates her goal: survive ninety-nine death games.
Scrap Building
2	"Chains of ----"	Masahiko Watanabe	Rintarou Ikeda	Noriyuki Abe	January 14, 2026
Yuki participates in her tenth death game: escape an abandoned building rigged with mines alongside veteran players Mishiro, Keito, Kotoha, and Chie before time runs out. She soon finds herself being the odd one out, as the others already know each other from other death games, which Mishiro uses to assume leadership despite Yuki having more experience. After Yuki makes an incorrect prediction about a trap, Mishiro starts to ignore Yuki's suggestions, even when she offers sound reasoning. As time passes and resources dwindle, the group gradually tires until Kotoha accidentally triggers a mine, blasting off her legs and knocking her unconscious. Since Kotoha is still alive, Yuki wants to go back for her. Mishiro argues for abandoning her, since she is no longer useful, and the others agree. Fed up with Mishiro's leadership, Yuki promptly splits from the group after claiming none of them truly understands the meaning behind this death game.
3	"In the Name of ----"	Naoki Murata	Rintarou Ikeda	Osamu Yamasaki	January 21, 2026
Yuki saves Kotoha, though she admits to only doing so to curry favor. As Yuki carries her around, Kotoha deduces that she is a survivor of "Candle Woods"—the worst death game in history. The two then bond over Kotoha's reason for participating: saving money to become a hikikomori. Meanwhile, having not encountered any mines for a while, Mishiro's group feels something is wrong before being attacked by a wolf, prompting them to flee separately. Later, Yuki and Kotoha also run into the wolf, but Yuki scares it off by standing her ground. They then meet up with Keito and Chie, who quickly switch allegiances. Elsewhere, wounded and in hiding, Mishiro blames Yuki for her misfortunes. Growing up with high expectations, which she never reached, she eventually snapped and violently attacked her sister before being scouted for death games, where she was promised that "no one would stand above her". Yuki comes back for her, but after finding her, offers to help only if Mishiro admits that Yuki is the better player.
4	"Bad ----"	Shunji Yoshida	Rintarou Ikeda	Shinji Ishihira	January 28, 2026
Although Yuki is just teasing Mishiro, the latter snaps at her demand and runs off, only to get ambushed by the wolf. Fortunately for her, Yuki has taken a liking to her and helps her escape by using herself as bait. Mishiro meets up with the others, who immediately ally with her again after previously abandoning her. However, upon reaching the exit, they learn that Yuki is still alive and must wait for her before the final challenge: a vote in which whoever gets a plurality dies. Kotoha already predicted this from pamphlets among their supplies and secretly allied with Chie, agreeing not to vote for each other. After Yuki arrives, having fended off the wolf with a knife, the vote takes place. In the end, Chie loses—Mishiro votes for Chie; Kotoha and Keito vote for each other; Chie's vote is unknown; and Yuki votes for everyone, but only the one for Chie got counted. Before parting ways after the game ends, Mishiro complies with Yuki's earlier demand by admitting that she is the better player. However, in private, Mishiro throws a tantrum and vows to beat Yuki.
Golden Bath
5	"---- Is All You Need"	Yui Kamura & Matsuo Asami	Rintarou Ikeda	Yui Kamura	February 4, 2026
Following her twenty-ninth death game, Yuki is nervous as she prepares to participate in her thirtieth, which is when most veteran players tend to die. She is also silently guilt-ridden over killing Kinko, but keeps telling herself that she is fine. Suffering from side effects of anesthesia, which she takes every game, Yuki leaves her apartment and wanders around aimlessly. Eventually, she is contacted by a man claiming to be Kinko's father, who is part of an organization attempting to end the death games. He tries to recruit her, but she turns him down. He nevertheless gives her a pill-shaped tracking device and tells her to swallow it if she changes her mind. Not long after, Yuki is picked up for her thirtieth game and given anesthesia. However, she accidentally consumes the tracker instead, forcing her to take the real anesthesia in secret. She falls asleep before waking up in a bathhouse where the game will take place. Elsewhere, Mishiro is revealed to be participating as well, leading a group of players to hunt down other participants.
6	"Who's ----ing You"	Masahiko Watanabe	Takumi Fukaya	Mitsuki Kobayashi	February 11, 2026
Exploring the bathhouse, Yuki is attacked by fellow player Azuma. Fortunately, she stops upon realizing Yuki is not part of Mishiro's group and introduces her to her comrades, who are hiding at one of the pools. Azuma explains the situation: the game's goal is to escape the building by stealing keys from other participants; Mishiro's group is camping at the exit while hunting other participants. Concluding that the opposing team might negotiate if the players and keys match, Yuki and Azuma plot an offensive to reduce the number of participants. Meanwhile, Mishiro learns that Yuki is in the game after her teammates spot her collecting miscellaneous items to craft weapons for her group's planned attack. Yuki and Azuma bond by revealing their reasons for participating, with Azuma doing so because of struggles with her lack of femininity. Shortly afterward, they learn that Mishiro's group attacked their hideout by breaking through the walls. In response, Yuki and Azuma rush back, only find that their teammates are dead and their enemy awaits them.
7	"Good ----"	Keijirō Taguchi & Matsuo Asami	Rintarou Ikeda	Taiei Andō	February 18, 2026
In the end, Mishiro's team defeats Yuki's. Yuki is spared on Mishiro's orders, but Azuma and the others are killed. As her teammates exit the bathhouse using the stolen keys, Mishiro confronts Yuki and is disappointed to find the latter reduced to begging for her life. Yuki attempts to flee, but Mishiro eventually corners her. Realizing she does not want to die, Yuki fights back and ultimately kills Mishiro, although she permanently loses three fingers in the process. Reaching the exit, Yuki is awaited by Mishiro's protégé, Riko, who was ordered to kill Yuki should Mishiro fail. Outmatched, Yuki steals Riko's key and tricks her into being killed by the game's final obstacle: automated turrets that gun down whoever approaches the exit without a key. Afterward, Yuki exits the bathhouse and is escorted home, where she reminisces about the casualties. She also deduces that the tracking device she swallowed was found and removed, and her late awakening during the game was a penalty.
Candle Woods
8	"---- It All"	Naoki Murata	Rintarou Ikeda	Shinji Ishihira	February 25, 2026
Yuki participates in her ninth death game, where she is reunited with her mentor, Hakushi, a legendary 96-game veteran. The players are divided into two factions: "Bunnies," who must survive in a forest for a week, and "Stumps", who must kill at least five Bunnies to win. While waiting for the game to start, Yuki and Hakushi discuss the latter's goal of surviving 99 games and breaking the rumored record of 98. Once the game begins, the Bunnies form a defense strategy. Veteran player Sumiyaka notes the near-impossible mathematical odds of Hakushi's survival streak, praising her genius before opting to wander off on her own. On the Stumps' side, a three-game veteran named Moegi steps up to lead the group, which is otherwise made up of newbies. Knowing they will die if they do not fulfill their kill quotas, Moegi forces her teammates to kill each other as practice, killing those who are unwilling to.
9	"Can't Help Falling in ----"	Shunji Yoshida	Rintarou Ikeda	Ryōji Fujiwara & Souta Ueno	March 4, 2026
After arming themselves with weapons prepared for them, the Stumps set out to fulfill their kill quotas. However, under Hakushi's leadership, the Bunnies easily turn the tables on them. Sumiyaka confides in Yuki about being nervous, since this is her thirtieth game. The outmatched Stumps retreat to the game's starting point, where infighting ensues. Blaming herself for the situation, Moegi recalls a previous game she played: viewing herself as "weak", she grew infatuated with a fellow player named Kyara, a homicidal maniac who murdered all the other participants. Moegi requested that Kyara teach her how to kill, which she did. In the present, upon learning that one of her teammates was found brutally murdered, Moegi deduces that Kyara is in the game. Meanwhile, Hakushi realizes Kyara has been hiding among the Bunnies and tries to warn Yuki and the others. However, when they are gathered, Kyara suddenly throws a smoke bomb looted from a Stump.
10	"Goin' ----"	Shinya Kawabe	Rintarou Ikeda	Shinya Kawabe	March 11, 2026
Having been taught by Hakushi never to fight a homicidal player, Yuki flees amidst Kyara's attack. Meanwhile, Moegi and the remaining Stumps desperately attempt to fulfill their kill quotas before Kyara kills all their targets; they also start killing each other to eliminate competition. Yuki and Moegi cross paths, resulting in a fight. Despite Moegi's best efforts, she is utterly outmatched by the more experienced Yuki, leaving her frustrated that, even after all of Kyara's training, she was never able to become "strong". Yuki takes Moegi's weapons and kills her. Afterward, Yuki wanders the game grounds aimlessly as she comes across the corpses of Kyara's victims, including Sumiyaka. She eventually finds Hakushi, who has seemingly been brutally murdered as well, with Kyara awaiting her.
11	"--v-"	Yui Kamura	Rintarou Ikeda	Shinobu Tagashira	March 18, 2026
Yuki is outraged about Kyara killing so many players simply to satiate her murderous urges, but Kyara reveals that Hakushi already had most of her body replaced with prosthetics. Kyara then attacks, and Yuki fights back. However, having reinforced her bones with metal, Kyara shrugs off Yuki's attacks and grievously injures her. As Yuki bleeds, Kyara accuses her of being the same as herself: an empty person who takes comfort in death games. While admitting Kyara is right, Yuki vows to live and continues fighting until she deduces that Hakushi hid a gun looted off a Stump, killing Kyara by shooting her at point-blank range. This seemingly leaves Yuki and Stump member Airi, who completed her kill quota in the chaos, as the game's sole survivors. Afterward, Yuki vows to carry on Hakushi's legacy by completing ninety-nine death games in her place, finally giving her life purpose, unaware that Hakushi secretly survived thanks to her prosthetics.

==== OVAs ====
No.	Title	Directed by	Written by	Storyboarded by	Original release date
Cloudy Beach
12	"L-o---e"	Yui Kamura	Rintarou Ikeda	TBA	July 10, 2026
Following her 40th game, Yuki is reunited with Airi—now a 32-game veteran—who predicts that another Candle Woods-like game is coming. Several months later, Yuki participates in her 44th game: survive on an abandoned island for a week alongside Airi, 49-game veteran Essay, 19-game veteran Koyomi, 42-game veteran Maguma, 29-game veteran Mitsuba, 9-game veteran Mozuku, and child-player Hizumi. However, on the second day, Essay is found seemingly deceased, causing the participants to realize there is a "murderer" amongst them with a three-player kill quota. Another day later, Mitsuba, who was Mishiro's protégé, is found dead after Yuki turned down a private conversation with her. Meanwhile, Airi is forced to kill Hizumi when the latter attacked her after she deduced that she was Kyara's protégé. Ultimately, Yuki deduces that Essay is the murderer, having faked her death, after Koyomi reveals that she was Hakushi's protégé. Elsewhere, with Mitsuba having actually committed suicide, Essay gets desperate and, on the last day, steals a gun from the rescue ship sent to retrieve the participants before opening fire on them. In the end, Yuki distracts Essay by threatening to commit suicide, allowing her to overpower and kill her. Afterward, having learned of Hakushi's survival from Koyomi, Yuki meets with her, during which Hakushi reveals that she cannot participate anymore due to her injuries before entrusting Yuki with her dream of completing 99 games.

=== Other media ===
Starting on October 26, 2022, a spin-off story was serialized over the course of a month in video and text form. The story used an epistolary format of interviewing Yuki about herself and her participation in the games, with Yuki being portrayed by Himari Meimei from the voice synthesizer software VOICEVOX.

Following the release of the first volume, another story was serialized, showing the perspectives of other players on Yuki in an interview-style format. It featured various voice actors.

The following volumes were all associated with media featuring voice actress Yuki Nakashima as Yuki. The second volume's publication came with the release of a promotional video for the series. The third volume features a scannable QR code that links to a voice drama where Yuki finds herself in a romantic situation. The fourth volume features another code which links to a voice drama in which Yuki visits a summer festival.

An artbook is set to be released on March 25, 2026.

== Reception ==
=== Light novels ===
==== Sales ====
According to Oricon charts, the seventh volume ranked 4th in total sales for the week of October 7, 2024, while the eighth volume ranked 2nd in total sales for the week of March 10, 2025.

By November 2025, the series had over 400,000 copies in circulation. In anticipation of the anime adaptation, the light novels underwent a large-scale reprint.

==== Accolades ====
The debut volume won the Excellence Award at the 18th annual MF Bunko J Light Novel Newcomer Awards in 2022. Two of the judges gave it the highest possible rating, while two of the judges gave it the lowest. The reviewing judge commented favorably on the story, stating that it was compelling and one of the most polarizing works ever submitted to the contest.

In November 2022, the first volume won the Light Novel News Online Awards in both the general and newcomer divisions. Both reviewing judges commended the story's characters, with particular praise for Yuki's portrayal.

The series ranked first in the New Title category and second in the Bunkobon category in Takarajimasha's Kono Light Novel ga Sugoi! 2024 guidebook. In the same year, it placed tenth in the Next Light Novel Awards in the bunkobon division.

==== Critical reception ====
Adam Symchuk of Asian Movie Pulse commended the "delectably dark and disturbing" first volume. He opined that the work's strength was in its characters, finding Yuki particularly "intriguing" for her "wonderfully twisted" actions. He also praised the story's second half, writing that it was "hard to understate [its] strength", and appreciated the work's avoidance of gratuitous violence. Despite lamenting some occasional flaws, he considered it "ridiculously fun" and worth continuing.

Kennedy of Anime News Network rated the first volume a "B", praising it as "fresh and original". He argued that the story distinguished itself by taking death games "to an extreme", and had an "interesting" protagonist in the calm and calculated Yuki. He was more mixed on the writing style, calling it "kinetic" but occasionally "clunky". Although he was less enthused about the deliberate avoidance of violent imagery, which he felt dampened the stakes, he ultimately concluded that the story was one that "instantly commands your attention".

Ota Shoki of Dengeki Online noted that most works in the death game genre typically end after a single game to avoid losing narrative tension. Shoki argued that the story dealt with this problem through portraying Yuki's unusually detached perspective, where she repeatedly enters games and treats them as a job rather than a moral struggle. He opined that this direct approach presented a different form of suspense and concluded that the story was an outstanding entry in the genre.

=== Anime ===
==== Critical reception ====
A panel by Anime News Network gave a generally warm reception to the premiere episode. James Beckett, writing the lead review, awarded the episode a perfect score, with particular praise for the "perfectly atmospheric [and] haunting" presentation in the visuals and soundtrack. He went on to acclaim the "bold, blistering confidence" of the premise, concluding that he "[could] not wait to see what comes next". Caitlin Moore held that the episode had the potential to be an "astounding achievement", though with reservations—she opined that while the show succeeded in evoking emotions from the viewers, its overall message was still ambiguous. Richard Eisenbeis commended the show's production value, contending that its unique aspects, such as unusual cuts and camera angles, were used to provide insight into the characters and their emotions. Rebecca Silverman was the only one to express a more neutral opinion; though she "appreciate[d] what this episode is trying to do", she felt that the detail was sometimes "excessive".

== See also ==
- Jishō F-Rank no Onii-sama ga Game de Hyōka Sareru Gakuen no Chōten ni Kunrin Suru Sō Desu yo?, another light novel series by the same illustrator
