= Sotsugyō Album no Kanojo-tachi =

Japanese manga series

- First tankōbon volume cover, featuring Manaka Muranaka, Takaho Takase (front), Sora Ōtsuka, and Koyuki Onomine (back)

卒業アルバムの彼女たち
- Genre: Harem; Romantic comedy
- Manga
- Written by: Ghost Mikawa
- Illustrated by: Takami Nobi
- Published by: Kodansha
- Imprint: Monthly Shōnen Magazine Comics
- Magazine: Magazine Pocket
- Original run: February 2, 2025 – present
- Volumes: 5

Sotsugyō Album no Kanojo-tachi (卒業アルバムの彼女たち; lit. 'The Heroines in My Graduation Albums') is a Japanese manga series written by Ghost Mikawa and illustrated by Takami Nobi. It began serialization on Kodansha's Magazine Pocket online service in February 2025, and has been compiled into five volumes as of August 2026.

== Plot ==
The series follows Meguru Kanae, a university student with an interest in movies. Looking back at his graduation album, he remembers girls he befriended in the past: his childhood friend Koyuki Onomine, track prodigy Manaka Muranaka, bookworm Takaho Takase. As none of these relationships advanced to romance, he decides to instead focus on his studies and the university's film club. During his second year, he and another member, Sora Ōtsuka, decide to quit their club due to creative disagreements. Sora informs him that she is starting a new film club and that three new members would be joining them: the three turn out to be Koyuki, Manaka, and Takaho. Now reunited with the three, Meguru must learn to deal with his relationships with them, while also dealing with his feelings for Sora.

== Characters ==
Meguru Kanae (叶絵 廻, Kanae Meguru)
A second-year university student who is studying business, who has a passion for filmmaking. His grandfather ran a cinema, which helped inspire his interest. He greatly admires Dwayne Johnson. Due to disagreeing with the university film club, he decides to quit together with Sora. He has had feelings for Sora since their first year of university.
Sora Ōtsuka (大塚 大空, Ōtsuka Sora)
A fellow business student and film buff. Meguru has had a crush on her since their first year. She left the university's original film club and starts her own with Sora, bringing in three other girls from different departments. She serves as the club's director and president. She has large breasts, which she uses to tease him.
Koyuki Onomine (小野峰 小雪, Onomiya Koyuki)
A psychology student, who serves as the club's leading actress. She was childhood friends with Meguru and his original crush, but the two grew apart after going to different schools. She is a popular model who goes by the name Yuki.
Manaka Muranaka (村中 愛中, Muranaka Manaka)
A sports science student, who serves as the club's stuntperson and scripwriter. She and Meguru were schoolmates in junior high school, with Manaka being the ace of the track team. Although the two became friends, their relationship never progressed beyond that.
Takaho Takase (高瀬 高穂, Takase Takaho)
A commerce student, who serves as the club's publicist. She was a member of the library committee in high school. Meguru befriended her over their shared interest in novels. She later worked for a successful businessperson, and she uses this experience in helping promote the club and its work.

== Publication ==
The series is written by Ghost Mikawa, who had previously written light novels such as My Friend's Little Sister Has It In for Me! and Days with My Stepsister. It began serialization on Kodansha's Magazine Pocket service on February 2, 2025. The first tankōbon volume was released on April 16, 2025; five volumes have been released as of August 17, 2026.

No.	Release date	ISBN
1	April 16, 2025	978-4-06-539010-8
Chapters 1–6
2	August 12, 2025	978-4-06-540417-1
Chapters 7–14
3	December 17, 2025	978-4-06-541576-4
Chapters 15–22
4	April 16, 2026	978-4-06-543163-4
Chapters 23–31
5	August 17, 2026	978-4-06-544459-7
Chapters 32–39

== See also ==
- Days with My Stepsister, a light novel series by the same writer
- Jishō F-Rank no Onii-sama ga Game de Hyōka Sareru Gakuen no Chōten ni Kunrin Suru Sō Desu yo?, a light novel series by the same writer
- My Friend's Little Sister Has It In for Me!, a light novel series by the same writer
