= Jishō F-Rank no Onii-sama ga Game de Hyōka Sareru Gakuen no Chōten ni Kunrin Suru Sō Desu yo? =

Japanese light novel series

- First light novel volume cover

自称Fランクのお兄さまがゲームで評価される学園の頂点に君臨するそうですよ? (Jishō F-Ranku no Onii-sama ga Gēmu de Hyōka Sareru Gakuen no Chōten ni Kunrin Suru Sō Desu yo?)
- Genre: Fantasy
- Light novel
- Written by: Ghost Mikawa
- Illustrated by: Nekometaru
- Published by: Media Factory
- Imprint: MF Bunko J
- Original run: April 25, 2017 – February 25, 2022
- Volumes: 12 + 1
- Manga
- Written by: Ghost Mikawa
- Illustrated by: Sorani
- Published by: Media Factory
- Imprint: MF Comics Alive Series
- Magazine: Monthly Comic Alive
- Original run: March 27, 2018 – March 27, 2024
- Volumes: 10

Jishō F-Rank no Onii-sama ga Game de Hyōka Sareru Gakuen no Chōten ni Kunrin Suru Sō Desu yo? (Note: Japanese: 自称Fランクのお兄さまがゲームで評価される学園の頂点に君臨するそうですよ?, Hepburn: Jishō F-Ranku no Onii-sama ga Gēmu de Hyōka Sareru Gakuen no Chōten ni Kunrin Suru Sō Desu yo?), also known as Jishō F-Rank (自称Fランク) for short, is a Japanese light novel series written by Ghost Mikawa and illustrated by Nekometaru. It is published by Media Factory under their MF Bunko J imprint; 13 volumes were released between April 2017 and February 2022. A manga adaptation illustrated by Sorani was serialized in Media Factory's Monthly Comic Alive magazine between March 2018 and March 2024, with the series' chapters being collected into 10 volumes.

== Plot ==
Guren Saijō, a legend in underworld games, enrolls at the prestigious Shishio Academy, a school whose students are known for being at the top of their fields. Despite his past and his desire to study there, Guren wishes for a normal life, not wanting to be caught between the school's intense pressures and rivalries. He goes as far as deliberately doing poorly on the entrance exam so he could enter the school under the lowest rank, F. However, things become complicated when he is reunited with his younger sister Karen. Finding himself entangled in the school's intense underworld game scene, Guren has no choice but to show his real strength whenever Karen is in trouble.

== Characters ==
Guren Saijō (砕城 紅蓮, Saijō Guren)
A first-year student at Shishio Academy who is skilled in underground games and is famous for his undefeated record. Because of his desire to live a normal school life, he hides his true powers from others unless necessary. He has the ability to see other people's thoughts.
Karen Saijō (砕城 可憐, Saijō Karen)
Guren's younger sister, who is deeply attached to him.

== Media ==
=== Light novels ===
The series is written by Ghost Mikawa and illustrated by Nekometaru. It is published by Media Factory, which released it under its MF Bunko J imprint. The first volume was released on April 25, 2017, and the twelfth and last volume was released on February 25, 2022. An extra volume, labeled as volume 6.5 and focusing on the characters' everyday life, was released on June 25, 2019.

| No. | Japanese release date | Japanese ISBN |
|---|---|---|
| 1 | April 25, 2017 | 978-4-04-069178-7 |
| 2 | August 25, 2017 | 978-4-04-069396-5 |
| 3 | January 25, 2018 | 978-4-04-069606-5 |
| 4 | May 25, 2018 | 978-4-04-069917-2 |
| 5 | October 25, 2018 | 978-4-04-065241-2 |
| 6 | March 25, 2019 | 978-4-04-065623-6 |
| 6.5 | June 25, 2019 | 978-4-04-065796-7 |
| 7 | August 24, 2019 | 978-4-04-065864-3 |
| 8 | December 25, 2019 | 978-4-04-064263-5 |
| 9 | May 25, 2020 | 978-4-04-064660-2 |
| 10 | October 24, 2020 | 978-4-04-065937-4 |
| 11 | September 25, 2021 | 978-4-04-680893-6 |
| 12 | February 25, 2022 | 978-4-04-681182-0 |

=== Manga ===
A manga adaptation illustrated by Sorani was serialized in Media Factory's Monthly Comic Alive magazine from March 27, 2018, and March 27, 2024. Ten tankōbon volumes were released between October 23, 2018, and May 23, 2024.

| No. | Japanese release date | Japanese ISBN |
|---|---|---|
| 1 | October 23, 2018 | 978-4-04-065174-3 |
| 2 | March 23, 2019 | 978-4-04-065493-5 |
| 3 | December 23, 2019 | 978-4-04-064089-1 |
| 4 | September 23, 2020 | 978-4-04-064892-7 |
| 5 | March 23, 2021 | 978-4-04-680306-1 |
| 6 | November 22, 2021 | 978-4-04-680864-6 |
| 7 | May 23, 2022 | 978-4-04-681429-6 |
| 8 | December 22, 2022 | 978-4-04-682057-0 |
| 9 | September 22, 2023 | 978-4-04-682743-2 |
| 10 | May 23, 2024 | 978-4-04-683588-8 |

== Reception ==
It was reported with the release of the tenth light novel volume that the series had sold over 500,000 copies. The series ranked 8th in a 2018 poll by the website Anime! Anime! on what novels or light novels readers wanted to receive an anime adaptation. Karen Saijō ranked 5th in a 2018 general popularity poll for Kadokawa light novel heroines.

== See also ==
- Days with My Stepsister, a mixed-media project created by the same author
- My Friend's Little Sister Has It In for Me!, another light novel series with the same author
- Playing Death Games to Put Food on the Table, another light novel series with the same illustrator
- Sotsugyō Album no Kanojo-tachi, a manga series written by the same author
