= My Friend's Little Sister Has It In for Me! =

Japanese light novel series and its adaptations

- First light novel volume cover featuring Iroha Kohinata

友達の妹が俺にだけウザい (Tomodachi no Imōto ga Ore ni Dake Uzai)
- Genre: Romantic comedy
- Light novel
- Written by: Ghost Mikawa
- Illustrated by: Tomari
- Published by: SB Creative
- English publisher: NA: J-Novel Club
- Imprint: GA Bunko
- Original run: April 15, 2019 – present
- Volumes: 11
- Manga
- Written by: Ghost Mikawa
- Illustrated by: Hira Hiraoka
- Published by: Square Enix
- English publisher: NA: Comikey Square Enix
- Magazine: Manga Up!
- Original run: December 13, 2019 – present
- Volumes: 11
- Anime television series
- Directed by: Kazuomi Koga
- Produced by: Shintarou Yoshitake; Kazuo Tsutsui; Koutarou Asanuma; Natsuko Nagase; Kazuo Oonuki; Tomoyuki Oowada; Airi Sawada; Eimi Nakagawa; Shintarou Shiozawa
- Written by: Touko Machida
- Music by: Tsugumi Tanaka; Kaho Sawada; Kanade Sakuma; Hanae Nakamura
- Studio: Blade
- Licensed by: Crunchyroll
- Original network: ANN (TV Asahi), BS11, AT-X
- Original run: October 5, 2025 – December 21, 2025
- Episodes: 12
- icon

My Friend's Little Sister Has It In for Me! (友達の妹が俺にだけウザい, Tomodachi no Imōto ga Ore ni Dake Uzai), or ImoUza!, is a Japanese light novel series written by Ghost Mikawa and illustrated by Tomari. The series began publication by SB Creative under their GA Bunko imprint in April 2019. The light novel is licensed in North America by J-Novel Club. A manga adaptation by Hira Hiraoka began serialization online in December 2019. An anime television series adaptation produced by Blade aired from October to December 2025.

== Plot ==
The series follows Akiteru Ōboshi, an ordinary student who is best friends with his classmate Ozuma Kohinata. Iroha, Ozuma's younger sister, often hangs out at his house and acts annoying towards him, a contrast to her in-school persona as a kind and diligent honor student. One day, he is asked by his uncle to start a relationship with his cousin Mashiro Tsukinomori in exchange for him providing support for his game development group, which they call the 5th Floor Alliance. Meanwhile, Iroha aims to be a professional voice actress, providing the voices for the 5th Floor Alliance's work, but does so in secret due to her family's disapproval of her interests.

== Characters ==
=== Main characters ===
Akiteru Ooboshi (大星 明照, Ooboshi Akiteru)
Voiced by: Haruki Ishiya
Akiteru is a second year high school student. In the series, Akiteru calls himself a well-rounded average student but still has a hidden side to him.
Iroha Kohinata (小日向 彩羽, Kohinata Iroha)
Voiced by: Sayumi Suzushiro
Iroha is Akiteru's best friend's younger sister. In the story, Iroha is a bright, kind, and beautiful honor student. She is described as an excitable person who also acts clingy towards Akiteru. She aims to become a voice actress. When she was in junior high school, she was on bad terms with Ozuma and was a loner, with only her dream of becoming a voice actress pushing her forward, despite her mother's disapproval. However, after meeting Akiteru, she opens up and gets into voice acting. Due to being on bad terms with her mother, she keeps her identity as a voice actress a secret from others, with only a few knowing about her career.
Mashiro Tsukinomori (月ノ森 真白, Tsukinomori Mashiro)
Voiced by: Tomori Kusunoki
Mashiro is a second year high school student, classmate and cousin of Akiteru. She is childhood friends with Akiteru and often played with him when they were younger. In the story, Mashiro is described as a gentle person when meeting strangers with a cold demeanor towards Akiteru. She speaks in the third-person. She is also a popular novelist who writes under the pen name Namako Makigai (巻貝 なまこ, Makigai Namako).
Ozuma Kohinata (小日向 乙馬, Kohinata Ozuma)
Voiced by: Soma Saito
Ozuma is a second year high school student and Iroha's older brother. In the story, Ozuma is a kind and caring person. He is described as "handsome like a prince" and is a genius programmer. Ozuma is Akiteru's only friend and has absolute faith in Akiteru due to some past events.
Sumire Kageishi (影石 菫, Kageishi Sumire)
Voiced by: Kana Hanazawa
Sumire is Akiteru's mathematics and homeroom teacher. She is described as a ruthless guidance and has a poisonous tongue. She secretly works as an illustrator under the pen name Shikibu Murasaki (紫 式部, Murasaki Shikibu). She is often late in finishing her work, much to Akiteru's chagrin.
Reiku Otoi (音井 麗紅, Otoi Reiku)
Voiced by: Azusa Tadokoro
Reiku is a second year high school student. She is a sound engineer.
Midori Kageishi (影石 翠, Kageishi Midori)
Voiced by: Reina Kondō
Midori is Sumire's little sister and the President of the Drama Club.
Kanaria Kiraboshi (綺羅星 金糸雀, Kiraboshi Kanaria)
Voiced by: Yukari Tamura
An idol and a famous editor at UZA Publishing, whose real name is Kana Hoshino (Hoshino Kana).
Sasara Tomosaka (友坂 茶々良, Tomosaka Sasara)
Voiced by: Ikumi Hasegawa
A first year high school student. She is an influencer on Pinstagram.

=== Supporting characters ===
Makoto Tsukinomori (月ノ森 真琴, Tsukinomori Makoto)
Voiced by: Katsuyuki Konishi
Mashiro's father and Akiteru's uncle. He is the president of the large entertainment enterprise Honeyplace Works.
Otoha Kohinata (小日向 乙羽, Kohinata Otoha)
Voiced by: Atsuko Tanaka (drama CD)
Otoha is the mother of both Ozuma and Iroha.
Kou Kageishi (影石 鉱, Kageishi Kou)
Sumire and Midori's Grandfather.
Mizuki Tsukinomori (月ノ森 海月, Tsukinomori Mizuki)
Mashiro's mother.
Asagi Tachibana (橘 浅黄, Tachibana Asagi)
Voiced by: Sayaka Kikuchi

== Media ==
=== Light novels ===
The light novel series is written by Ghost Mikawa and features illustrations by Tomari. It is published by SB Creative under their GA Bunko imprint, with the first volume being released on April 15, 2019; eleven volumes have been released as of March 2025. The series is licensed in English by J-Novel Club.

No.	Original release date	Original ISBN	English release date	English ISBN
1	April 12, 2019	978-4-8156-0187-4	February 10, 2021 (digital); December 7, 2021 (print)	978-1-7183-2680-4
2	July 12, 2019	978-4-8156-0277-2	April 23, 2021 (digital); February 1, 2022 (print)	978-1-7183-2681-1
3	November 14, 2019	978-4-8156-0427-1	July 9, 2021 (digital); March 29, 2022 (print)	978-1-7183-2682-8
4	March 13, 2020	978-4-8156-0480-6; 978-4-8156-0479-0 (SE)	October 29, 2021 (digital); May 24, 2022 (print)	978-1-7183-2683-5
5	August 6, 2020	978-4-8156-0623-7	January 14, 2022 (digital); August 2, 2022 (print)	978-1-7183-2684-2
6	December 10, 2020	978-4-8156-0781-4; 978-4-8156-0780-7 (SE)	April 15, 2022 (digital); January 17, 2023 (print)	978-1-7183-2685-9
7	March 12, 2021	978-4-8156-0783-8; 978-4-8156-0782-1 (SE)	July 8, 2022 (digital); April 18, 2023 (print)	978-1-7183-2686-6
8	August 12, 2021	978-4-8156-1014-2; 978-4-8156-1013-5 (SE)	October 7, 2022 (digital); August 8, 2023 (print)	978-1-7183-2687-3
9	January 15, 2022	978-4-8156-1227-6; 978-4-8156-1226-9 (SE)	January 12, 2023 (digital); June 11, 2024 (print)	978-1-7183-2688-0
10	October 15, 2022	978-4-8156-1600-7; 978-4-8156-1599-4 (SE)	August 4, 2023 (digital); December 10, 2024 (print)	978-1-7183-2689-7
11	March 15, 2025	978-4-8156-1912-1	December 5, 2025 (digital); October 13, 2026 (print)	978-1-7183-2690-3

=== Manga ===
A manga adaptation by Hira Hiraoka began serialization in Square Enix's Manga Up! online web service on December 13, 2019, and has been compiled into eleven tankōbon volumes as of May 2026. The manga is set to end with the release of its twelfth volume. The manga is published in English in North America by Comikey and Square Enix through the global version of Manga Up!.

No.	Japanese release date	Japanese ISBN
1	August 6, 2020	978-4-7575-6754-2
2	November 7, 2020	978-4-7575-6929-4
3	June 7, 2021	978-4-7575-7298-0
4	January 7, 2022	978-4-7575-7550-9
5	July 7, 2022	978-4-7575-8011-4
6	February 7, 2023	978-4-7575-8388-7
7	September 7, 2023	978-4-7575-8770-0
8	July 5, 2024	978-4-7575-9288-9
9	March 7, 2025	978-4-7575-9602-3
10	October 7, 2025	978-4-301-00100-3
11	May 7, 2026	978-4-301-00505-6

=== Anime ===
An anime television series adaptation was announced during a livestream for the "GA Fes 2021" event on January 31, 2021, with the cast of the series' drama CDs reprising their roles. It is produced by Blade and directed by Kazuomi Koga, with series composition and screenplays by Touko Machida, character designs Katsuyuki Sato, and music by Tsugumi Tanaka, Kaho Sawada, Kanade Sakuma and Hanae Nakamura. The series aired from October 5 to December 21, 2025, on the NUMAnimation programming block on TV Asahi and its affiliates. (Note: TV Asahi listed the series premiere on October 4 at 25:30, which is effectively Sunday at 1:30 a.m. JST.) The opening theme song is "Uza Kawaikute Nani ga Warui!" (ウザ可愛くて何が悪い！; 'What's Wrong With Being Annoyingly Cute!'), performed by Karubi Akami, while the ending theme song is "Hoshi no Kodō" (星の鼓動; 'Beat of the Star'), performed by Kohana Lam. Crunchyroll streamed the series.

==== Episodes ====
No.	Title	Directed by	Storyboarded by	Original release date
1	"My Friend's Little Sister Has It In for Me!"; Transliteration: "Tomodachi no Imōto ga Ore ni Dake Uzai" (Japanese: 友達の妹が俺にだけウザい)	Kazuomi Koga	Kazuomi Koga	October 5, 2025
2	"The Cousin I Haven't Seen in Years Is Cold to Me"; Transliteration: "Hisabisa no Itoko ga Ore ni Dake Tsumetai" (Japanese: 久々の従姉妹が俺にだけ冷たい)	Naoko Takeichi	Miyana Okita	October 12, 2025
3	"Only I Can Be a Pain to My Uncle’s Daughter"; Transliteration: "Oji-san no Musume ni Oredake ga Uzai" (Japanese: 伯父さんの娘に俺だけがウザい)	Naoki Hishikawa	Miyana Okita	October 19, 2025
4	"My Friend's Little Sister Might Be a Delinquent"; Transliteration: "Tomodachi no Imōto ga Moshikashite Furyō" (Japanese: 友達の妹がもしかして不良)	Daisuke Tsukushi	Daisuke Tsukushi	October 26, 2025
5	"My Friend's Little Sister Keeps Getting Close to Me"; Transliteration: "Tomodachi no Imōto ga Ore ni Dake Chikai" (Japanese: 友達の妹が俺にだけ近い)	Michita Shiraishi	Miyana Okita	November 2, 2025
6	"My Friend's Little Sister Has It In for My Friend's Enemy"; Transliteration: "Tomodachi no Imōto wa Tomodachi no Teki ni Uzai" (Japanese: 友達の妹は友達の敵にウザい)	Kentarō Mizuno	Miyana Okita	November 9, 2025
7	"The Girl Who Confessed to Me Is Cold to Me in Reality"; Transliteration: "Kokuhaku Shite Kita Joshi ga Genjitsu de Dake Tsumetai" (Japanese: 告白してきた女子が現実でだけ冷たい)	Naoko Takeichi	Miyana Okita	November 16, 2025
8	"Everyone I Know Is Being Weird With Me"; Transliteration: "Ore no Mawari no Renchū ga Ore ni Dake Okashī" (Japanese: 俺の周りの連中が俺にだけおかしい)	Naoki Hishikawa	Hideki Futamura	November 23, 2025
9	"My Fake Girlfriend Gets Tough When I Respond to Her Confession"; Transliteration: "Kokuhaku no Henji ni Nise Kanojo ga Tezuyoi" (Japanese: 告白の返事にニセ彼女が手強い)	Arisa Shima	Miyana Okita	November 30, 2025
10	"My Friend's Little Sister Only Gets an Apology from Me"; Transliteration: "Tomodachi no Imōto ni ore Dake ga Shazai" (Japanese: 友達の妹に俺だけが謝罪)	Kentarō Mizuno	Kōji Yoshikawa & Hikari Takeuchi	December 7, 2025
11	"We're Perfect for Training the Drama Club"; Transliteration: "Engeki-bu no Tokkun ni Oretachi ga Tsuyoi" (Japanese: 演劇部の特訓に俺達が強い)	Naoko Takeichi	Miyana Okita	December 14, 2025
12	"My Friend's Little Sister Really Does Have It In for Me"; Transliteration: "Yappari Tomodachi no Imōto ga Ore ni Dake Uzai" (Japanese: やっぱり友達の妹が俺にだけウザい)	Kazuomi Koga & Yamato Hayashi	Kazuomi Koga	December 21, 2025

== See also ==
- Days with My Stepsister, a mixed-media project by the same author.
- Jishō F-Rank no Onii-sama ga Game de Hyōka Sareru Gakuen no Chōten ni Kunrin Suru Sō Desu yo?, another light novel series by the same author.
- Sotsugyō Album no Kanojo-tachi, a manga series written by the same author.
- Spy Classroom, another light novel series illustrated by the same illustrator.
