= Days with My Stepsister =

Japanese media franchise

- First light novel volume cover, featuring Yūta Asamura and Saki Ayase

義妹生活 (Gimai Seikatsu)
- Genre: Romantic comedy
- Light novel
- Written by: Ghost Mikawa
- Illustrated by: Hiten
- Published by: Media Factory
- English publisher: NA: Yen Press
- Imprint: MF Bunko J
- Original run: January 25, 2021 – present
- Volumes: 18
- Manga
- Written by: Ghost Mikawa
- Illustrated by: Yumika Kanade
- Published by: Kadokawa Shoten
- English publisher: NA: Yen Press
- Magazine: Shōnen Ace Plus
- Original run: July 16, 2021 – present
- Volumes: 5
- Anime television series
- Directed by: Souta Ueno
- Written by: Mitsutaka Hirota
- Music by: Citoca
- Studio: Studio Deen
- Licensed by: Crunchyroll
- Original network: AT-X, Kansai TV, Tokyo MX, BS11
- Original run: July 4, 2024 – September 19, 2024
- Episodes: 12
- icon

Days with My Stepsister (義妹生活, Gimai Seikatsu) is a Japanese mixed-media project created by Ghost Mikawa. It started with a YouTube channel created in April 2020, with its first video uploaded on May 1, 2020. A light novel series is written by Ghost Mikawa and illustrated by Hiten. The series began publication by Media Factory under their MF Bunko J imprint in January 2021. A manga adaptation by Yumika Kanade began serialization online in Kadokawa Shoten's Shōnen Ace Plus in July 2021. An anime television series adaptation produced by Studio Deen aired from July to September 2024.

== Premise ==
After his father's remarriage, Yūta Asamura finds himself getting a new stepsister, Saki Ayase, who happens to be the hottest girl in his grade, and living together with her. Having learned the important values about man-woman relationships, seen through their parents as they carry the scars of their parents' troubled divorces, and in order to not cause discord in the family, Yūta and Saki promise to keep a reasonable distance from each other, not to be too close or too opposing. Saki, who is longing for affection from her family and worked in solitude for their sake, does not know how to depend on others, while Yūta is bewildered at how to properly connect to Saki as his younger sister. Feeling somewhat similar, the two of them gradually feel comfortable living together. But what starts as cautious camaraderie blossoms into something deeper from shared experiences. Is it admiration, familial love, or something more?

== Characters ==
Yūta Asamura (浅村 悠太, Asamura Yūta)
Voiced by: Kōhei Amasaki
The protagonist of the Days with My Stepsister series. He is Saki's step-brother and a second-year high school student. He works part-time at a bookstore. Although he and Saki initially have a distant relationship, he develops feelings for her, triggered by the sight of her during a visit to the swimming pool. They later officially become a couple and enter university.
Saki Ayase (綾瀬 沙季, Ayase Saki)
Voiced by: Yuki Nakashima
She is Yuuta's step-sister and a second-year high school student. She has the appearance of a gyaru. She later works part-time at the same bookstore Yuuta works. Although she and Yuuta initially have a distant relationship, she develops feelings for him, triggered by him turning down her offer to have sex with him and talking about their issues about their former mother/father. She later cuts her hair short which later regrows back to its original length in later volumes.
Tomokazu Maru (丸 友和, Maru Tomokazu)
Voiced by: Daiki Hamano
Yuuta's friend at school. He is a member of the baseball team and an otaku.
Maaya Narasaka (奈良坂 真綾, Narasaka Maaya)
Voiced by: Ayu Suzuki
Saki's friend at school. She is always cheerful and meddlesome. She got increasingly involved with Saki because she could not stand to see her isolated, and later became her friend.
Shiori Yomiuri (読売 栞, Yomiuri Shiori)
Voiced by: Minori Suzuki
A university student who works part-time as a senior to Yuuta at the bookstore.
Taichi Asamura (浅村 太一, Asamura Taichi)
Voiced by: Kōhei Amasaki (voice comic), Chikahiro Kobayashi (anime)
Yuuta's father and Saki's new step-father. After divorcing his ex-wife for various reasons, he re-married to Akiko. He has a good relationship with Yuuta and Saki.
Akiko Ayase (綾瀬 亜季子, Ayase Akiko)
Voiced by: Eriko Hara (voice comic), Reina Ueda (anime)
Saki's mother and Yuuta's new step-mother. After divorcing her ex-husband, she worked tirelessly to provide for Saki until she re-married to Taichi. She was a gyaru during her high school years.
Kaho Fujinami (藤波 夏帆, Fujinami Kaho)
Voiced by: Atsumi Tanezaki
Keisuke Shinjō (新庄 圭介, Shinjō Keisuke)
Voiced by: Ryōhei Arai
Eiha Kudō (工藤 英葉, Kudō Eiha)
Voiced by: Mie Sonozaki

== Media ==
=== YouTube channel ===
While writing several works, author Ghost Mikawa learned of the existence of a reader who had a request to "deeply dig into the daily life of the characters". He was interested in seeing what would happen if he tried to write an unusual work, and decided to write a story depicting the relationship between step-siblings.

Regarding the production of the videos, Mikawa is the original author of the Gimai Seikatsu storyline, but the script of the story is handled by multiple writers. According to Mikawa, the writing style of each writer is shown in each script, so it is often taken as it is.

All videos on the YouTube channel are subtitled in English, Chinese, Spanish and Vietnamese.

=== Light novels ===
The light novel series is written by Ghost Mikawa and features illustrations by Hiten. It is published by Media Factory under their MF Bunko J imprint, with the first volume being released on January 25, 2021; sixteen volumes have been released as of February 25, 2026.

At Sakura-Con 2023, Yen Press announced that they licensed the series for English publication.

| No. | Original release date | Original ISBN | English release date | English ISBN |
|---|---|---|---|---|
| 1 | January 25, 2021 | 978-4-04-064726-5 | October 17, 2023 | 978-1-9753-7203-3 |
Prologue; June 7 (Sunday); June 8 (Monday); June 9 (Tuesday); June 10 (Wednesday); June 11 (Thursday); June 12 (Friday); June 13 (Saturday); Epilogue; Saki Ayase's Diary
| 2 | March 25, 2021 | 978-4-04-680326-9 | February 20, 2024 | 978-1-9753-7205-7 |
Prologue; July 16 (Thursday); July 17 (Friday); July 18 (Saturday); July 19 (Sunday); July 20 (Monday); July 21 (Tuesday); July 22 (Wednesday); Epilogue; Saki Ayase's Diary
| 3 | July 21, 2021 | 978-4-04-680607-9 | June 18, 2024 | 978-1-9753-7207-1 |
Prologue; August 22 (Saturday); August 23 (Sunday); August 24 (Monday); August 25 (Tuesday); August 26 (Wednesday); August 27 (Thursday); August 28 (Friday); Epilogue; Saki Ayase's Diary?
| 4 | December 24, 2021 | 978-4-04-681001-4 | November 19, 2024 | 978-1-9753-7209-5 |
Prologue—Yuuta Asamura; September 3 (Thursday)—Yuuta Asamura; September 3 (Thursday)—Saki Ayase; September 4 (Friday)—Yuuta Asamura; September 4 (Friday)—Saki Ayase; September 24 (Thursday)—Yuuta Asamura; September 24 (Thursday)—Saki Ayase; September 25 (Friday)—Yuuta Asamura; September 25 (Friday)—Saki Ayase; September 26 (Saturday)—Saki Ayase; September 26 (Saturday)—Yuuta Asamura; September 27 (Sunday)—Yuuta Asamura; September 27 (Sunday)—Saki Ayase; September 28 (Monday)—Yuuta Asamura
| 5 | April 25, 2022 | 978-4-04-681361-9 | March 25, 2025 | 978-1-9753-7211-8 |
Prologue—Yuuta Asamura; October 19 (Monday)—Yuuta Asamura; October 19 (Monday)—Saki Ayase; October 20 (Tuesday)—Yuuta Asamura; October 20 (Tuesday)—Saki Ayase; October 21 (Wednesday)—Yuuta Asamura; October 21 (Wednesday)—Saki Ayase; October 29 (Thursday)—Yuuta Asamura; October 29 (Thursday)—Saki Ayase; October 30 (Friday)—Yuuta Asamura; October 30 (Friday)—Saki Ayase; October 31 (Saturday)—Yuuta Asamura; October 31 (Saturday)—Saki Ayase
| 6 | August 25, 2022 | 978-4-04-681656-6 | November 11, 2025 | 978-1-9753-7213-2 |
Prologue—Yuuta Asamura; December 11 (Friday)—Yuuta Asamura; December 11 (Friday)—Saki Ayase; December 13 (Sunday)—Yuuta Asamura; December 13 (Sunday)—Saki Ayase; December 19 (Saturday)—Yuuta Asamura; December 19 (Saturday)—Saki Ayase; December 20 (Sunday)—Yuuta Asamura; December 20 (Sunday)—Saki Ayase; December 24 (Thursday)—Yuuta Asamura; December 24 (Thursday)—Saki Ayase; December 31 (Thursday)—Yuuta Asamura; December 31 (Thursday)—Saki Ayase; January 1 (Friday)—Yuuta Asamura; January 1 (Friday)—Saki Ayase
| 7 | December 23, 2022 | 978-4-04-682033-4 | June 9, 2026 | 979-8-8554-0833-1 |
Prologue—Yuuta Asamura; February 14 (Sunday)—Yuuta Asamura; February 14 (Sunday)—Saki Ayase; February 16 (Tuesday)—Yuuta Asamura; February 16 (Tuesday)—Saki Ayase; February 17 (Wednesday)—Yuuta Asamura: Day 1 of the School Trip; February 17 (Wednesday)—Saki Ayase: Day 1 of the School Trip; February 18 (Thursday)—Yuuta Asamura: Day 2 of the School Trip; February 18 (Thursday)—Saki Ayase: Day 2 of the School Trip; February 19 (Friday)—Saki Ayase: Day 3 of the School Trip; February 19 (Friday)—Yuuta Asamura: Day 3 of the School Trip; February 20 (Saturday)—Yuuta Asamura: Day 4 of the School Trip (Final Day); February 20 (Saturday)—Saki Ayase: Day 4 of the School Trip (Final Day)
| 8 | April 25, 2023 | 978-4-04-682404-2 | November 10, 2026 | 979-8-8554-0835-5 |
| 9 | August 25, 2023 | 978-4-04-682764-7 | — | — |
| 10 | January 25, 2024 | 978-4-04-683233-7 | — | — |
| 11 | July 25, 2024 | 978-4-04-683793-6 | — | — |
| 12 | October 25, 2024 | 978-4-04-684229-9 | — | — |
| 13 | February 25, 2025 | 978-4-04-684554-2 | — | — |
| 14 | June 25, 2025 | 978-4-04-684885-7 | — | — |
| 15 | October 24, 2025 | 978-4-04-685288-5 | — | — |
| 16 | February 25, 2026 | 978-4-04-685707-1 | — | — |
| 17 | June 25, 2026 | 978-4-04-660163-6 | — | — |
| 18 | October 23, 2026 | 978-4-04-660639-6 | — | — |

==== Spin-off ====
Ghost Mikawa has also worked on a spin-off, focusing on Shiori Yomiuri and his comment of each anime episode titled, Gimai Seikatsu another days (義妹生活 another days; "Days with My Stepsister Another Days"). It is published by Media Factory under their MF Bunko J imprint.

| No. | Release date | ISBN |
|---|---|---|
| 1 | February 25, 2025 | 978-4-04-684555-9 |

=== Manga ===
A manga adaptation with art by Yumika Kanade began serialization in Kadokawa Shoten's Shōnen Ace Plus online web service on July 16, 2021.

During their Anime NYC 2023 panel, Yen Press announced that they also licensed the manga for English publication.

| No. | Original release date | Original ISBN | English release date | English ISBN |
|---|---|---|---|---|
| 1 | April 26, 2022 | 978-4-04-112284-6 | October 22, 2024 | 978-1-9753-7215-6 |
1. A Real Stepsister; 2. The New Stepsister; 3. Less like Siblings; 4. The Rumored Older Brother; 5. "Stop it—it's embarrassing." 6. "Hey, Asamura-kun?"
| 2 | December 26, 2022 | 978-4-04-113171-8 | January 21, 2025 | 978-1-9753-7899-8 |
7. Would You Be Willing...; 8. Modern Japanese and Jealousy; 9. A Late-Night Movie Date with Yomiuri; 10. My Stepsister Meets Yomiuri for the First Time; 11. Pay More Attention to Me; Bonus Manga
| 3 | September 26, 2023 | 978-4-04-113914-1 | April 22, 2025 | 978-1-9753-9866-8 |
12. What's This Feeling I'm Experiencing?; 13. An Unknown Promise; 14. It Would Ruin Everything; 15. A Simple "Why Not?"; 16. First Time at the Pool with My Stepsister; 17. Siblings
| 4 | June 25, 2024 | 978-4-04-115047-4 | September 23, 2025 | 979-8-8554-1679-4 |
18. A Joint Declaration; 19. Someone Other Than You; 20. As Siblings; 21. True Feelings; 22. Becoming Regular Siblings; 23. Even If You Feel That Way
| 5 | March 24, 2025 | 978-4-04-115957-6 | April 28, 2026 | 979-8-8554-2773-8 |
24. Being Cute and Vulnerable; 25. Fashion; 26. Our First Date; 27. Our Birthdays; 28. Always Thinking of You; 29. On Halloween Night
| 6 | February 25, 2026 | 978-4-04-117168-4 | — | — |
| 7 | September 25, 2026 | 978-4-04-117769-3 | — | — |

=== Others ===
An art book Gimai Seikatsu Hiten ātowākusu (義妹生活 Hitenアートワークス; Days with My Stepsister Hiten Artworks) is published by Kadokawa.

| No. | Release date | ISBN |
|---|---|---|
| 1 | September 25, 2024 | 978-4-04-683800-1 |

=== Anime ===
In July 2022, during the "Natsu no Gakuensai 2022" event for MF Bunko J, an anime television series adaptation was announced. The cast of the YouTube channel are reprising their roles. It is produced by Studio Deen and directed by Souta Ueno, with scripts written by Mitsutaka Hirota, characters designed by Manabu Nii, and music composed by Citoca. The series aired from July 4 to September 19, 2024, on AT-X and other networks, with Crunchyroll streaming the series worldwide outside of East Asia. The opening theme song is "Tenshi-tachi no Uta" (天使たちの歌, lit. 'Song of the Angels') performed by fhána, while the ending theme song is "Suisō no Buranko" (水槽のブランコ, lit. 'Aquarium Swing') performed by Kitri.

==== Episodes ====
| No. | Title | Directed by | Written by | Storyboarded by | Original release date |
|---|---|---|---|---|---|
| 1 | "I'm Home with a Stranger"; Transliteration: "Tanin to Tadaima" (Japanese: 他人とただいま) | Daiei Ando, Mizuki Kobayashi & Naoki Murata | Mitsutaka Hirota | Souta Ueno | July 4, 2024 |
| 2 | "A Deal and Fried Eggs"; Transliteration: "Torihiki to Medama Yaki" (Japanese: 取引と目玉焼き) | Shun Nakajima | Mitsutaka Hirota | Hiroyuki Fukushima | July 11, 2024 |
| 3 | "Reflection and Revision"; Transliteration: "Hansha to Shūsei" (Japanese: 反射と修正) | Souta Ueno, Taro Kubo & Naoki Murata | Mitsutaka Hirota | Souta Ueno | July 18, 2024 |
| 4 | "Tendencies and Strategies"; Transliteration: "Keikō to Taisaku" (Japanese: 傾向と対策) | Daiei Ando, Shun Nakajima & Naoki Murata | Hana Yamada | Daiei Ando | July 25, 2024 |
| 5 | "A Late Show and the Real Deal"; Transliteration: "Reitoshō to Gachi na Yatsu" (Japanese: レイトショーとガチなやつ) | Mizuki Kobayashi | Megumi Sasano | Mizuki Kobayashi | August 1, 2024 |
| 6 | "Sweet & Sour Pork and Rain"; Transliteration: "Subuta to Ame" (Japanese: 酢豚と雨) | Shintaro Ito | Hana Yamada | Souta Ueno | August 8, 2024 |
| 7 | "Feelings and Summer Vacation"; Transliteration: "Kanjō to Natsuyasumi" (Japanese: 感情と夏休み) | Souta Ueno & Taro Kubo | Mitsutaka Hirota | Hiroyuki Fukushima | August 15, 2024 |
| 8 | "A Response and Hot Milk"; Transliteration: "Henji to Hotto Miruku" (Japanese: 返事とホットミルク) | Hamana Takayuki | Megumi Sasano | Mizuki Kobayashi | August 22, 2024 |
| 9 | "Stepsister and Diary"; Transliteration: "Gimai to Nikki" (Japanese: 義妹と日記) | Souta Ueno & Mizuki Kobayashi | Mitsutaka Hirota | Souta Ueno | August 29, 2024 |
| 10 | "Relations and Regrets"; Transliteration: "En to Miren" (Japanese: 縁と未練) | Shun Nakajima | Hana Yamada | Shun Nakajima | September 5, 2024 |
| 11 | "Brother and Sister"; Transliteration: "Ani to Imōto" (Japanese: 兄と妹) | Shintaro Ito & Daiei Ando | Mitsutaka Hirota | Hiroyuki Fukushima | September 12, 2024 |
| 12 | "and" Transliteration: "to" (Japanese: と) | Souta Ueno, Mizuki Kobayashi & Shintaro Ito | Mitsutaka Hirota | Souta Ueno | September 19, 2024 |

== Reception ==
In the 2022 edition of Takarajimasha's annual light novel guide book Kono Light Novel ga Sugoi!, the novel series ranked 7th in the bunkobon category, and 3rd in the new work category. By January 2024, the series had over 600,000 copies in circulation.

== See also ==
- Jishō F-Rank no Onii-sama ga Game de Hyōka Sareru Gakuen no Chōten ni Kunrin Suru Sō Desu yo?, another light novel series by the same author
- My Friend's Little Sister Has It In for Me!, another light novel series by the same author
- Sotsugyō Album no Kanojo-tachi, a manga series by the same author
