= Spy Classroom =

Japanese light novel series

- Cover of the first light novel volume

スパイ教室 (Supai Kyōshitsu)
- Genre: Adventure
- Light novel
- Written by: Takemachi
- Illustrated by: Tomari
- Published by: Fujimi Shobo
- English publisher: NA: Yen Press
- Imprint: Fujimi Fantasia Bunko
- Original run: January 18, 2020 – present
- Volumes: 16 + 6 short stories
- Manga
- Written by: Takemachi
- Illustrated by: Kaname Seu (Part 1, 3, 4); Benishake (Part 2)
- Published by: Media Factory
- English publisher: NA: Yen Press
- Magazine: Monthly Comic Alive
- Original run: May 27, 2020 – present
- Volumes: 9
- Anime television series
- Directed by: Keiichiro Kawaguchi
- Produced by: Aya Iizuka; Hajime Maruyama; Satoshi Motonaga; Akihiro Sotokawa; Kayoko Ninomiya
- Written by: Shinichi Inotsume
- Music by: Yoshiaki Fujisawa
- Studio: Feel
- Licensed by: Sentai Filmworks: SEA: Bilibili
- Original network: AT-X, Tokyo MX, BS Nittele, KBS Kyoto, SUN, TV Aichi
- Original run: January 5, 2023 – September 28, 2023
- Episodes: 24
- Light novel

Side "Ōtori"
- Written by: Takemachi
- Illustrated by: Gabiran
- Published by: Fujimi Shobo
- Imprint: Fujimi Fantasia Bunko
- Original run: November 20, 2025 – present
- Volumes: 2
- icon

Spy Classroom (Japanese: スパイ教室, Hepburn: Supai Kyōshitsu), also known as Spy Room, is a Japanese light novel series written by Takemachi and illustrated by Tomari. Fujimi Shobo published the first volume under their Fujimi Fantasia Bunko imprint in January 2020. As of November 2026, sixteen main series volumes and six short story volumes in February 2024 have been released.

A manga adaptation with illustrations by Kaname Seu was serialized in Media Factory's Monthly Comic Alive magazine between May 2020 and April 2022. As of July 2022, its chapters have been collected into three tankōbon volumes. A second part of the manga by Benishake and a third part by Seu both began serializiation in the same magazine in June 2022.

An anime television series adaptation produced by Feel aired from January to March 2023. A second season aired from July to September 2023.

== Plot ==
After a devastating war, there has been a realization that weapons are now too powerful and destructive. Thus ends the era of war fought in the "light" and begins the era of war fought within "darkness", a war fought with information and trickery, a war of spies. After the destruction of the spy team Inferno, their only surviving member, Klaus, sets off to create a team who specializes in "Impossible Missions". Impossible missions are missions that a spy team has already failed thus leading to higher security resulting in a chance of failure to be 90 percent.

The problem? The seven girls that Klaus has recruited are all terrible, according to him, flunking the spy schools they hailed from. Klaus only has a month to teach them everything he knows and in turn the girls will have to employ every possible trick to have a chance of surviving.

== Characters ==
The assembled Lamplight agents (from left to right: Sibylla, Thea, Erna, Lily, Monika, Annette, Grete and Sara) as seen from the anime adaptation

=== Lamplight ===
Klaus (クラウス, Kurausu)
Voiced by: Yūichirō Umehara
Portrayed by: Makoto Renjō
The boss of Lamplight and former member of Inferno, 20 years old, code name Bonfire (燎火, Kagaribi), who re-established Lamplight after Inferno was wiped out. Self proclaimed "the Greatest Spy in the World". Despite being "the Greatest Spy in the World" he is terrible at teaching as he does things intuitively.
His catchphrase is "It's the best" (極上だ, gokujōda)
Lily (リリィ, Rirī)
Voiced by: Sora Amamiya
Portrayed by: Yui Yokoyama
She has silver hair, 17 years old, code name Flower Garden (花園, Hanazono). The team leader of Lamplight. Her specialty is using poison to disable her enemies while she has a special immunity to poison herself. She wants to become a spy due to her life being saved by one after she survived a poison gas attack during the Great War. Due to her concern for the Lamplight team and her own skills, she is designated by Klaus to be the team leader for Lamplight.
Her catchphrase is "I'm code name《Flower Garden》it's time to bloom out of control." (コードネーム《花園》咲き狂う時間です, Kōdo nemu《Hanazono》sakikuruu jikandesu)
Grete (グレーテ, Gurēte)
Voiced by: Miku Itō
Portrayed by: Fuyuna Asakura
She has red hair, 18 years old, code name Daughter Dearest (愛娘, Manamusume). She is good with disguises. She was a daughter of politician but due to being born with a disfiguring birthmark on her face, she was shunned by her family which drove her to become a spy. Her efforts in hiding the birthmark helped her develop her disguise skills. Although she has an excellent brain, she has a deep-rooted distaste for men.
Her catchphrase is "I'm code name《Daughter Dearest》now let's fill this time with laughter and tears." (コードネーム《愛娘》笑い嘆く時間にしましょう, Kōdo nemu《Manamusume》warai nageku jikan ni shimashou)
Sibylla (ジビア, Jibia)
Voiced by: Nao Tōyama
Portrayed by: Sena
She has white hair, 17 years old, code name Pandemonium (百鬼, Hyakki). She is good at stealing and the most athletic member of the team. She was born into a gangster family, which she and her younger siblings were forced to help in gang activities. She has a strong sense of justice and wanted to be a spy to protect her younger siblings.
Her catchphrase is "I'm code name《Pandamonium》it's time I cleaned you out." (コードネーム《百鬼》攫い叩く時間にしてやんよ, Kōdo nemu《Hyakki》sarai tataku jikan ni shite yan yo)
Monika (モニカ)
Voiced by: Aoi Yūki
Portrayed by: Sana Hoshimori
She has cerulean hair, 16 years old, code name Glint (氷刃, Hyojin). The most talented as a spy amongst the members of Lamplight. She is the daughter of an artist, but she ran away from home and aspired to be a spy. She is also secretly in love with another member of Lamplight.
Her catchphrase is "I'm code name《Glint》now, let's harbor love for as long as we can." (コードネーム《氷刃》時間の限り愛し抱け, Kōdo nemu《Hyojin》jikan no kagiri aishi dake)
Thea (ティア, Tia)
Voiced by: Sumire Uesaka
Portrayed by: Haruna Ishii
She has black hair, 18 years old, code name Dreamspeaker (夢語, Yumegatari). The oldest and most attractive member of Lamplight, she is good with negotiations. As she is older than the other members, she often acts like a leader. She was the daughter of a newspaper company president and abducted when she was 11 as a hostage. She was saved by Hearth, the leader of Inferno, who she admired and became her inspiration to becoming a spy.
Her catchphrase is "I'm code name《Dreamspeaker》it's time to lure them to their ruin." (コードネーム《夢語》惹き壊す時間よ, Kōdo nemu《Yumegatari》hiki kowasu jikan yo)
Sara (サラ)
Voiced by: Ayane Sakura
Portrayed by: Kaoru Takaoka
She has brown hair, 15 years old, code name Meadow (草原, Sōgen). She is good with rearing animals. She is a timid but kind-hearted girl who tends to add "ssu" at the end of her words. She is the daughter of chef and restaurant owner in a rural town. She owns and commands both a trained dog and hawk.
Her catchphrase is "I'm code name《Meadow》it's time to run circles around them." (コードネーム《草原》駆け回る時間っす, Kōdo nemu《Sōgen》kakemawaru jikanssu)
Annette (アネット, Anetto)
Voiced by: Tomori Kusunoki
Portrayed by: Saki Kitazawa
She has ash pink hair, 14 years old, code name Forgetter (忘我, Bōga). She is good with engineering. She has no memories from her past before she join training school, and she became a spy because of her special skills, without even knowing who she was. She is a mechanical genius, being able to craft all types of traps and gadgets but possesses a warped sense of morality that makes her the most ruthless member of Lamplight.
Her catchphrase is "I'm code name《Forgetter》it's time to put it all together." (コードネーム《忘我》組みあげ時間にしましょう, Kōdo nemu《Bōga》kumiage jikan ni shimashou)
Erna (エルナ, Eruna)
Voiced by: Inori Minase
Portrayed by: Ui Sakura
She has blonde hair, 14 years old, code name Fool (愚人, Gujin). The eighth and youngest member of Lamplight who arrived at Heat Haze Palace and joined Lamplight a day later than other members, due to running into a series of accidents. She is good at predicting misfortune before it occurs. She was born into an aristocratic family and lost her parents in a tragic mansion fire. Since the loss, she's been plagued with misfortune at an alarming rate. After so many close brushes with misfortune, she developed a sense for bad luck which she states holds a certain smell.
Her catchphrase is "I'm code name《Fool》it's time to kill with everything." (コードネーム《愚人》尽くしす時間なの, Kōdo nemu《Gujin》tsukushi su jikan'na no)

== Media ==
=== Light novels ===
The light novel is written by Takemachi and illustrated by Tomari; Fujimi Shobo published the first volume under its Fujimi Fantasia Bunko imprint on January 18, 2020. As of November 2026, sixteen volumes of the main series have been released. Six short story volumes have also been released. Asaura is listed as "assistance with firearm research" of the series.

Before the first volume was published, a promotional video was released, where Yūichirō Umehara, Sora Amamiya, Miku Itō, Nao Tōyama, Aoi Yūki, Sumire Uesaka, Ayane Sakura and Tomori Kusunoki played the roles of the members in Lamplight. It was the first time for a promotional video of a light novel series to feature as many as eight voice actors.

A spin-off written by Takemachi and illustrated by Gabiran, titled スパイ教室 side『鳳』 (Supai Kyōshitsu side "Ōtori"), was published by Fujimi Fantasia Bunko on November 20, 2025. It follows a newly-formed team Avian.

In January 2021, Yen Press announced they licensed the series for English publication. During their New York Comic Con 2022 panel, Yen Press announced that they had also licensed the short story collections.

==== Volumes ====
===== Main series =====
No.	Title	Original release date	English release date
1	Lily of the Garden 《花園》のリリィ	January 18, 2020; 978-4-04-073480-4	August 24, 2021; 978-1-9753-2240-3
Prologue: Special Assignment; Chapter 1: Coercion; Chapter 2: Coordination; Chapter 3: Intel Gathering; Chapter 4: Lies and Retrieval; Epilogue: Loss and Rebirth
2	To My Dearest Grete 《愛娘》のグレーテ	April 17, 2020; 978-4-04-073636-5	January 25, 2022; 978-1-9753-2242-7
Prologue: Succession; Chapter 1: Disguise; Chapter 2: Placation; Chapter 3: Exposed; Chapter 4: Love and Assassination; Epilogue: Dearest Daughter; Next Mission
3	To Forget Is Annette 《忘我》のアネット	August 20, 2020; 978-4-04-073740-9	May 17, 2022; 978-1-9753-3882-4
Prologue: Disappearance; Chapter 1: Appeal; Interlude: Missing ①; Chapter 2: Reunion; Interlude: Missing ②; Chapter 3: Mother and Daughter; Interlude: Missing ③; Chapter 4: Schism; Interlude: Missing ④; Interlude: Villain; Chapter 5: A Battle Against Great Evil; Epilogue: Forgetter; Next Mission
4	Thea in Dreamland 《夢語》のティア	December 19, 2020; 978-4-04-073741-6	October 18, 2022; 978-1-9753-3884-8
Prologue: Purple Ant ①; Chapter 1: Mobilizing; Interlude: Purple Ant ②; Chapter 2: Hostilities; Chapter 3: Hero; Interlude: Purple Ant ③; Chapter 4: Peril; Interlude: Purple Ant ④; Chapter 5: Domination and Negotiation; Epilogue: Boss and Graduation
5	Fool Erna Once 《愚人》のエルナ	May 20, 2021; 978-4-04-073742-3	May 23, 2023; 978-1-9753-4312-5
Prologue; Chapter 1: Encounter; Chapter 2: Liecraft; Chapter 3: Unlucky; Chapter 4: Ideals and Reality; Chapter 5: Fool; Next Mission
6	Pandemonium, Thy Name Is Sybilla 《百鬼》のジビア	September 18, 2021; 978-4-04-074253-3	August 22, 2023; 978-1-9753-5028-4
Prologue: Reminiscence; Chapter 1: Interrogation; Chapter 2: Searching; Chapter 3: Counterattack; Chapter 4: Lamplight and Avian; Epilogue: Joint Mission; Next Mission
7	A Glint in Monika's Eye 《氷刃》のモニカ	March 18, 2022; 978-4-04-074254-0	May 21, 2024; 978-1-9753-6749-7
Prologue: Nightmare; Chapter 1: Scarlet Leviathan ①; Chapter 2: Glint ①; Chapter 3: Scarlet Leviathan ②; Chapter 4: Glint ②; Chapter 5: Scarlet Leviathan ③; Chapter 6: Glint ③; Chapter 7: Scarlet Leviathan ④; Chapter 8: Glint ④; Chapter 9: Glint and Scarlet Leviathan; Chapter 10: Traitor; Epilogue: The Girl and the World; Next Mission
8	Sara's Meadow of Opportunity 《草原》のサラ	July 20, 2022; 978-4-04-074607-4	September 17, 2024; 978-1-9753-6751-0
Prologue: Machinations; Chapter 1: Rearing; Chapter 2: White Spider; Chapter 3: Resurrection; Chapter 4: The Status Quo; Chapter 5: Bird of Fire; Epilogue: Retirement and Legacy; Secret Epilogue: Serpent
9	Annette and Her Many Knickknacks 《我楽多》のアネット	January 20, 2023; 978-4-04-074766-8	July 15, 2025; 978-1-9753-9150-8
Prologue: The Thirteenth Day (Part One); Chapter 1: The Islanders; Chapter 2: The Navy; Chapter 3: The Pirates; Epilogue: The Thirteenth Day (Part Two); Next Mission
10	The High Plain of Sara 《高天原》のサラ	July 20, 2023; 978-4-04-075017-0	March 10, 2026; 978-1-9753-9710-4
Prologue: Secret; Chapter 1: Undercover; Interlude: Meadow I; Chapter 2: Society; Interlude: Meadow II; Chapter 3: Brainwashing; Interlude: Meadow III; Chapter 4: Human and Superhuman; Interlude: Meadow IV; Epilogue: Meetup
11	Monika's Thin Veneer 《付焼刃》のモニカ	November 17, 2023; 978-4-04-075018-7	September 8, 2026; 979-8-8554-0524-8
Prologue: Secret; Chapter 1: Solution; Chapter 2: Clown; Chapter 3: Troupe; Chapter 4: Pathology; Chapter 5: Royal Guard; Chapter 6: Tactician God; Chapter 7: Bloodsucker; Chapter 8: Cohabitation; Epilogue: Bouquet; Interlude: Empire
12	《万愚節》のエルナ	October 19, 2024; 978-4-04-075338-6	—
13	《燎火》のクラウス	June 20, 2025; 978-4-04-075893-0	—
14	《夢幻劇》のティア	November 20, 2025; 978-4-04-075894-7	—
15	《天邪鬼》のジビア	July 17, 2026; 978-4-04-076490-0	—
16	《失楽園》のリリィ	November 20, 2026; 978-4-04-076655-3	—

===== Short stories =====
No.	Title	Original release date	English release date
1	Bridal Royale 花嫁ロワイヤル	March 19, 2021; 978-4-04-074066-9	April 18, 2023; 978-1-9753-6496-0
Prologue: The Bridal Hearing; Chapter 1: Sybilla's Case; Chapter 2: Sara's Case; Interlude: Intermission ①; Chapter 3: Monika's Case; Chapter 4: Grete's Case; Interlude: Intermission ②; Chapter 5: Bridal Royale
2	The Spy Teacher Who Loved Me 私を愛したスパイ先生	December 18, 2021; 978-4-04-074358-5	December 12, 2023; 978-1-9753-6498-4
Prologue: The Spy Teacher Who Loved Me; Chapter 1: Annette's Case; Chapter 2: Thea's Case; Interlude: Intermission ①; Chapter 3: Erna's Case; Chapter 4: Lily's Case; Interlude: Intermission ②; Chapter 5: The Spy Who Loved Us; Bonus Episode
3	Honeymoon Raker ハネムーン・レイカー	October 20, 2022; 978-4-04-074728-6	December 17, 2024; 978-1-9753-9712-8
Prologue: The Legend of the Moonrakers; Chapter 1: Pharma's Case; Flashback ①: The Avian Ecosystem; Chapter 2: Lan's Case; Flashback ②: Girls' Night; Chapter 3: Queneau's Case; Flashback ③: Football; Chapter 4: Vics's Case; Flashback ④: Guys' Night; Chapter 5: Qulle's Case; Flashback ⑤: "Sky Monk" Adi; Chapter 6: Honeymoon Raker
4	No Time for Goodbye; NO TIME TO 退	March 17, 2023; 978-4-04-074919-8	September 16, 2025; 978-1-9753-9714-2
Prologue: No Time to Leave; Chapter 1: The Spy Academies' Case; Chapter 2: Another Spy Team's Case; Interlude: Intermission ①; Chapter 3: The Foreign Intelligence Office Management's Case; Chapter 4: A Life Outside of Espionage's Case; Interlude: Intermission ②; Chapter 5: No Time for Goodbye; Bonus Short Story
5	From Inferno with Love 『焔』より愛をこめて	February 20, 2024; 978-4-04-075264-8	July 14, 2026; 979-8-8554-1494-3
6	消されたアクトレス	March 19, 2026; 978-4-04-076295-1	—

===== Side "Ōtori" =====
No.	Title	Japanese release date	Japanese ISBN
1	スパイには向かない殺人	November 20, 2025	978-4-04-076101-5
2	安楽椅子の密偵	March 19, 2026	978-4-04-076296-8

=== Manga ===
A manga adaptation, illustrated by Kaname Seu, was serialized in Media Factory's Monthly Comic Alive magazine from May 27, 2020, to April 27, 2022. As of July 2022, the individual chapters have been collected into three tankōbon volumes. A second part of the manga illustrated by Benishake and a third part illustrated by Seu both began serializiation in the same magazine on June 27, 2022.

Yen Press is also publishing the first part of the manga adaptation in English.

==== Volumes ====
===== First part =====
No.	Original release date	Original ISBN	English release date	English ISBN
1	December 23, 2020	978-4-04-680002-2	January 25, 2022	978-1-9753-3888-6
1. Assembly; 2. Coercion; 3. Theft; 4. Coordination; 5. Discovery
2	August 23, 2021	978-4-04-680542-3	June 21, 2022	978-1-9753-4512-9
6. Seduction; 7. Hostage (Part 1); 8. Hostage (Part 2); 9. Situation; 10. Departure
3	July 20, 2022	978-4-04-681523-1	May 23, 2023	978-1-9753-6919-4
11. Intel Gathering; 12. Confrontation; 13. Impossible; 14. Lies and Retrieval; 15. Loss and Rebirth

===== Second part =====
No.	Original release date	Original ISBN	English release date	English ISBN
1	February 21, 2023	978-4-04-682136-2	April 22, 2025	979-8-8554-0292-6
1. Holiday A 2. Decision; 3. Scheme; 4. Maids; 5. Senator; 6. Masterpiece; 7. Cinderella
2	November 17, 2023	978-4-04-682841-5	September 23, 2025	979-8-8554-0294-0
8. Covert; 9. Showdown; 10. Disciple Dearest; 11. Teacher and Student; 12. Dearest Daughter I 13. Dearest Daughter II; 14. Dearest Daughter III

===== Third part =====
No.	Original release date	Original ISBN	English release date	English ISBN
1	February 21, 2023	978-4-04-682137-9	August 26, 2025	979-8-8554-0291-9
1. Holiday B 2. Charm; 3. The Corpse Mission; 4. Mother; 5. Memories; 6. Discovery; 7. Unchanging
2	November 17, 2023	978-4-04-682842-2	March 24, 2026	979-8-8554-0297-1
8. Duel, Part 1; 9. Duel, Part 2; 10. Army; 11. Escape; 12. Wiles; 13. Forgetter I 14. Forgetter II

===== Fourth part =====
No.	Original release date	Original ISBN	English release date	English ISBN
1	December 27, 2024	978-4-04-811298-7	September 22, 2026	979-8-8554-3053-0
2	March 28, 2025	978-4-04-811472-1	January 26, 2027	979-8-8554-3055-4

=== Anime ===
An anime television series adaptation was announced during the "Fantasia Bunko Online Festival 2022" event on March 13, 2022. The series is produced by Feel and directed by Keiichiro Kawaguchi, with scripts written by Shinichi Inotsume, character designs handled by Sumie Kinoshita, and music composed by Yoshiaki Fujisawa. It aired from January 5 to March 30, 2023, on AT-X and other networks. The opening theme song is "Tōmoshibi" (灯火; "Light") performed by Nonoc, while the ending theme song is "Secret Code" performed by Konomi Suzuki. At Anime NYC 2022, Hidive announced that the series will be streamed in North America in 2023. On February 16, 2023, it was announced that episode 8 was delayed a week from February 23 to March 2, due to COVID-19.

A second season was announced on April 7, 2023. It is again directed by Kawaguchi, with returning staff. It aired from July 13 to September 28, 2023. The opening theme song is "Rakuen" (楽園; "Paradise") performed by Nonoc, while the ending theme song is "Nuisance" (ニューサンス) performed by Sajou no Hana.

==== Season 1 ====
No. overall	No. in season	Title	Directed by (Note: Information is taken from the ending credits of each episode.)	Written by	Storyboarded by	Original release date
1	1	"Mission: Flower Garden"; Transliteration: "Misshon "Hanazono"" (Japanese: MISSION《花園》)	Takafumi Fujii	Shinichi Inotsume	Keiichiro Kawaguchi	January 5, 2023
2	2	"Mission: Flower Garden"; Transliteration: "Misshon "Hanazono"" (Japanese: MISSION《花園》)	Tatsuya Sasaki	Shinichi Inotsume	Tomoki Kobayashi	January 12, 2023
3	3	"Mission: Flower Garden"; Transliteration: "Misshon "Hanazono"" (Japanese: MISSION《花園》)	Shōta Imai	Shinichi Inotsume	Masahiko Murata	January 19, 2023
Part I: Ten years after the destructive Great War, the nations of the world decided to turn to espionage rather than open warfare to resolve their conflicts. In the Din Republic, master spy Klaus is given an "Impossible Mission" which if he manages to pull off, will cement his reputation as the "Greatest Spy in the World". As part of this mission, Klaus gathers seven young spy cadets who are struggling in training, including a girl named Lily, into a team codenamed Lamplight. He explains that he will help train them to prepare for an Impossible Mission in the Galgad Empire, but while he proves to be a master spy, he is actually a poor teacher. Thinking that Klaus intends to use them as sacrificial pawns, Lily ambushes Klaus with poison gas in an attempt to force him to disband Lamplight. However, Klaus reveals he already saw through Lily's ambush, but he is impressed how she took the initiative to try and improve her situation, which gives him inspiration on how to teach the other students. The next day, Klaus installs Lily as the team leader for Lamplight and assures them that he won't let any of them die. In order for them to learn the skills they need, Klaus challenges the students to defeat him in a game of espionage. Part II: For the next five days, Lamplight works together to try and ambush Klaus, but with little success as he easily thwarts their plots. Eventually, the team starts to get frustrated until Lily suggest they actually try investigating Klaus' background. Meanwhile, Klaus is briefed by his superior C that the Galgad Empire stole a sample of a deadly bioweapon from the Din Republic called Abyss Doll, and the Impossible Mission is to retrieve the sample before the Galgad Empire can reverse engineer it. Klaus then returns to Lamplight and comes clean with them, revealing that he is a member of Team Inferno, the Din Republic's best spy team. However, the rest of Inferno was killed trying to retrieve Abyss Doll, and he accepted the mission in order to avenge them. Lamplight, having already learned of his connection to Inferno and inspired by his resolve, agree to follow Klaus. The team then infiltrates the Galgad Empire to collect information on the Endry Lab where Abyss Doll is stored. The night before the mission, Lamplight invite Klaus to attend a party so they call relieve their built up stress. Klaus arrives to find the girls asleep, and he remembers a lesson he was taught where a person willing to sleep in front of another is a sign of ultimate trust. Klaus once again swears to get the entire team home safely. The next night, Lamplight and Klaus prepare to infiltrate Endry to retrieve Abyss Doll. Part III: Klaus and Lamplight infiltrate the complex, but Lamplight is intercepted by Klaus' mentor, Guido, who reveals that he had betrayed Inferno and switched sides. In addition, he had arranged for their headquarters to be bugged, so the Empire already knows all of their plans. Regardless, Lamplight decides to fight back but are quickly neutralized by Guido. However, as Guido gloats over his victory, Lily reveals that they had already suspected there was a traitor within Inferno and acted accordingly, hiding the existence of an eighth member named Erna who stabs Guido. Klaus then arrives, having recovered Abyss Doll and orders Lamplight to escape with it while he deals with Guido. Slowed down by his wound, Guido is no match for Klaus, and after being defeated he saves Klaus from a sniper, taking the hit himself and dying before he could reveal why he betrayed Inferno. Klaus and Lamplight return to the Din Republic, but instead of disbanding and returning to their respective academies, the team decides to stay together and continue to learn under Klaus' tutelage.
4	4	"File: Fool Erna"; Transliteration: "Fairu "Gujin" no Eruna" (Japanese: File《愚人》のエルナ)	Shin'ichi Tatsuta	Keiichiro Kawaguchi	Kō Matsuo	January 26, 2023
Twenty days prior to the Impossible Mission, Erna takes it upon herself to try and defeat Klaus. She is apparently cursed with bad luck, which causes accidents to happen to people around her and makes her the perfect assassin, though it means she cannot get close to anybody. She meets Klaus in town and attempts to lead him into accidents, but Klaus' skill means he is able to avoid all of them. He then tells Erna that he already knows how her ability works. Erna doesn't actually cause or attract misfortune, but her survivor's guilt over the fire that killed her family has caused her to subconsciously seek out misfortune as a way of punishing herself. Klaus instead praises Erna, pointing out that all the accidents that happened to him would have hurt other people. Klaus and Erna are then captured by kidnappers, though Klaus figures out they were tricked by Lamplight into attacking him. With the ruse exposed, Lamplight takes down the kidnappers and assure Erna that they can handle any misfortune she brings their way. Encouraged, Erna begins to feel more at home with Lamplight.
5	5	"File: Lamplight Time"; Transliteration: "Fairu "Tomoshibi" no Jikan" (Japanese: File《灯》の時間)	Yasunori Gotō	Shinichi Inotsume	Keiichiro Kawaguchi, Shin'ichi Tatsuta & Yasunori Gotō	February 2, 2023
Prior to the Impossible Mission, after another failed attempt at defeating Klaus, the members of Lamplight decide to try their own solo plans rather than work as a team. Thea tries to convince Lily to seduce Klaus, but the attempt fails spectacularly. Meanwhile, Erna ends up being exasperated at Annette because her bad luck keeps triggering Annette's traps. Lily then learns from Grete that Klaus always cooks his own meals and she recalls he never eats with the team. After Sibylla and Monika's own plots fail, Lily suggests another team plan. They secretly tail Klaus and surmise that he actually allergic to beef, shrimp, and dairy, which is why he is careful of what he eats. The team then cooks a full meal using those three ingredients, and pressure Klaus to eat it. Klaus eats the meal and thanks the girls, and they realize that Klaus had already known about their plot and tricked them into cooking what he wanted to eat. However, upon learning from Erna that Klaus is only 20 years old, the girls move on to their next plot. Klaus is pleased that Lamplight are beginning to bond together like a true family, but is despondent this his own family, Inferno, is gone.
6	6	"File: Pandemonium Sibylla"; Transliteration: "Fairu "Hyakki" no Jibia" (Japanese: File《百鬼》のジビア)	Takafumi Fujii	Kazuho Hyōdō	Minoru Ōhara	February 9, 2023
After another failed attack where Lamplight attempted to use Lily as an unwitting chili bomb carrier, Sibylla decides to handle the next attack on Klaus alone, planning to steal a classified document he is supposed to pick up tomorrow. That night, Lily finds out that Sibylla wants to become a spy to help support her two younger siblings who are still living in an orphanage. The next day, Sibylla tails Klaus, but can't find an opening to steal his bag. However, she does catch a young girl named Finé attempting to pickpocket Klaus. Reminded of her own rough childhood, Sibylla takes pity on Finé who takes advantage of her kindness to steal her bag. Klaus then reveals that he has been investigating a criminal who has been forcing orphans to steal valuables for him. Sibylla confronts and takes down the criminal, while Klaus apprehends him, leaving Finé and the other children to be taken in by the police. Sibylla remarks that she wants to be a spy to create a world where children won't be exploited, and Klaus praises her on how a spy's strength is in their motivation. He then reveals that Lamplight had planted a chili bomb on Sibylla and avoids the blast as it explodes. Sibylla later confronts Lily about the bomb, but Lily turns the tables when she intimates that Sibylla has a crush on Klaus. Klaus observes and is glad that Lamplight are capable of deceiving each other.
7	7	"File: Meadow Sara"; Transliteration: "Fairu "Sōgen" no Sara" (Japanese: File《草原》のサラ)	Taichi Yoshizawa	Noboru Kimura	Tetsuo Hirakawa	February 16, 2023
Sara recalls her motivations for becoming a spy, which is mainly to earn enough money to support her family and not out any sense of patriotism. However, she has so far struggled in training, which has led her to have self doubts about her skills. During their training with Klaus, Lamplight realize that their repeated attacks on him have been steadily damaging the mansion they are living in. However, they decide to continue focus on attacking Klaus rather than try to fix the damage. Late at night, Sara stumbles across Klaus washing dishes, and he correctly surmises that Sara has been secretly repairing parts of the mansion alone during the night. Sara explains she doesn't want to trouble her teammates and she feels repairing the mansion is all she is good for. The next day, Klaus challenges Lamplight to a series of contests to repair parts of the mansion. On the final challenge, which involves washing windows on the second floor, Sara employs the use of her trained animals to help ferry water to the rest of the team. Even though Lamplight loses all the contests, Sara finally gains the courage to convince the rest of the rest of the team to take maintenance of the mansion more seriously. Sara then thanks Klaus, realizing he set up the contests to show Sara that she possesses strengths the other girls don't. In the present, after the completion of the Impossible Mission, Klaus meets C, who tells him that the sniper who killed Guido is likely part of the Empire's top spy team, Serpent.
8	8	"Mission: Daughter Dearest"; Transliteration: "Misshon "Manamusume"" (Japanese: MISSION《愛娘》)	Jun Takada	Keiichiro Kawaguchi	Keiichiro Kawaguchi	March 2, 2023
9	9	"Mission: Daughter Dearest"; Transliteration: "Misshon "Manamusume"" (Japanese: MISSION《愛娘》)	Tatsuya Sasaki	Shinichi Inotsume	Minoru Ōhara	March 9, 2023
10	10	"Mission: Daughter Dearest"; Transliteration: "Misshon "Manamusume"" (Japanese: MISSION《愛娘》)	Shin'ichi Tatsuta	Noboru Kimura	Tomoki Kobayashi	March 16, 2023
11	11	"Mission: Daughter Dearest"; Transliteration: "Misshon "Manamusume"" (Japanese: MISSION《愛娘》)	Takashi Ikehata	Kazuho Hyōdō	Tetsuo Hirakawa & Keiichiro Kawaguchi	March 23, 2023
Part I: Some time after the completion of the Impossible Mission, Klaus returns to the mansion from vacation, where he thwarts more attempts by Lamplight to ambush him. In addition, Grete begins serving tea to him privately in his room and openly flirts with him, leading him to wonder why she has such an interest in him. Klaus is given a second Impossible Mission to hunt down the infamous assassin Corpse, who has killed many politicians and Republic spies. Klaus is also assigned a mission to apprehend an enemy spy, and he takes Lily with him. Though he completes the mission, he is stabbed with a poison needle by Lily, who claims he instructed her to earlier. Klaus then realizes that Grete disguised herself as him and gave false orders to Lily so he wouldn't pick up any hostile intent. While he's impressed with Grete's plan, he reveals he had already caught on to her trap. However, Grete and Lamplight insist on helping him on his missions, which he so far has been handling solo which has been affecting his health. That night, when Grete serves tea to him again, Klaus correctly deduces that Grete has romantic feelings for him. Still impressed with how Grete was able to come up with such an elaborate plan to trap him in such a short amount of time, Klaus decides to have her and Lamplight's strongest members accompany him on the hunt for Corpse. Part II: Klaus informs Lamplight about the mission to neutralize Corpse. Fearing they won't be picked, Lily and Sibylla attempt a ploy to poison Klaus to prove themselves, but Klaus tricks them into drinking their own poison. Despite this, Klaus picks Lily, Grete, Sibylla, and Sara for the mission and the infiltrate politician Uwe Appel's mansion under the guise of newly hired servants to protect him from Corpse. However, Uwe proves to be paranoid from the assassinations, and is also thrifty and difficult to please, putting strain on the girls. During a break, Grete confides in Sibylla that she is actually the daughter of a prestigious political family, and that she gets physically ill when she has to talk to any men besides Klaus. Frustrated, Sibylla sneaks into Uwe's office to try and find blackmail material on him, but finds that he is actually an ardent supporter of philanthropy and welfare. Uwe catches Sibylla and recognizes her as the orphan who helped bring down a criminal organization. He decides to overlook her trespass, but fires all of the girls. Despite this, Sibylla is still determined to protect Uwe since they have the shared goal helping the country's orphans. She manages to convince Uwe to reverse his decision, and she becomes his personal driver. One night, Corpse makes his move and attempts to shoot Uwe but misses his shot. Klaus, Lily, and Sibylla then chase him into the forest. Part III: Corpse manages to escape into the forest, leaving the girls with no choice but to keep protecting Uwe until he makes his next move. Head maid Olivia later confronts Grete about refusing to mingle with male guests at a dinner party, and Grete tells a partial lie that she's in love with another man. Later that night, Corpse attacks again, but Uwe is saved thanks to Sibylla's intervention. Olivia then openly becomes suspicious of the girls, warning Uwe how they are acting uncharacteristically calm despite the attempted assassinations. However, Grete points out Olivia's odd behavior as well, and she backs off. Lily, Sibylla, and Sara then secretly confront Grete, suspecting she has been hiding part of the plan from them. Grete admits that she had disguised herself as Corpse and initiated the two previous assassination attempts in order to flush out the real Corpse hiding among the mansion staff. Her cover blown, Olivia attempts to kill the girls with grenades. When Lily suggests they summon Klaus for help, Grete tells her that Klaus will not be coming, so they will have to handle Olivia on their own. Part IV: Grete reveals that Klaus was never present, and that she had been impersonating him during their mission briefings in order to throw off Corpse. In addition, Olivia is one of Corpse's accomplices. Trusting Grete, Lily, Sibylla, and Sara to be able to handle Olivia themselves, Klaus left on a second mission with the rest of Lamplight to take down Corpse. As she flees, Olivia recalls how she first met Corpse when she stumbled onto one of his assassinations and fell in love with him, becoming his apprentice. She manages to evade Lily and Sibylla and confronts Grete directly. Grete lures Olivia into a situation where she thinks she has the advantage, until she tricks Uwe into shooting Olivia. Grete then reveals a disfiguring birthmark on her face, which she honed her disguise skills to hide. Klaus then arrives with Corpse in his custody, and reveals he was awed by Grete's dedication to hiding her birthmark before capturing Olivia. Afterwards, Lily arranges for Klaus and Grete to go out on a date, where Klaus makes it clear he holds no romantic feelings for Grete or anybody else. However, wants to consider Grete as part of his family and reiterates that he thinks she is beautiful despite her birthmark, which makes Grete happy.
12	12	"File: Daughter Dearest Grete"; Transliteration: "Fairu "Manamusume" no Gurēte" (Japanese: File《愛娘》のグレーテ)	Taichi Yoshizawa	Shinichi Inotsume	Keiichiro Kawaguchi & Shin'ichi Tatsuta	March 30, 2023
Several weeks before the mission to eliminate Corpse, Grete decides to buy a special meat pie for Lamplight while Klaus is away on vacation. However, they are dismayed to discover that the baker who makes the meat pies has recently been harassed by the president of the Mannheim food corporation, who is attempting to coerce him into selling his meat pie recipe. Too old to deal with the harassment, the baker considers closing down permanently which Grete cannot accept since the bakery is important to Klaus. Working together, Lamplight craft an elaborate con to sell a fake recipe to the Mannheim president. The plan is mostly successful, with Lamplight stealing the president's money, though Lily is forced to use knockout gas on him when he pulls a gun on her. After the conclusion of the mission to eliminate Corpse, Grete returns to the bakery to get a meat pie for the rest of Lamplight, and is pleasantly surprised to see that the baker has taken on an apprentice to continue his business. Grete and Klaus then return to the mansion, where Lily warns them that the second team hasn't returned yet. Elsewhere, Thea watches over a sleeping Annette and Erna while Monika holds her at gunpoint, asking whether she intends to betray Lamplight.

==== Season 2 ====
No. overall	No. in season	Title	Directed by	Written by	Storyboarded by	Original release date
13	1	"Mission: Forgetter"; Transliteration: "Misshon "Bōga"" (Japanese: MISSION《忘我》)	Shōta Imai	Keiichiro Kawaguchi	Shōta Imai	July 13, 2023
14	2	"Mission: Forgetter"; Transliteration: "Misshon "Bōga"" (Japanese: MISSION《忘我》)	Taichi Yoshizawa	Keiichiro Kawaguchi	Kō Matsuo	July 20, 2023
15	3	"Mission: Forgetter"; Transliteration: "Misshon "Bōga"" (Japanese: MISSION《忘我》)	Shin'ichi Tatsuta	Kazuho Hyōdō	Itsuro Kawasaki	July 27, 2023
16	4	"Mission: Forgetter"; Transliteration: "Misshon "Bōga"" (Japanese: MISSION《忘我》)	Satoshi Saga	Shinichi Inotsume	Takashi Yamamoto	August 3, 2023
Part I: With the second team still missing, C considers declaring them traitors, but Klaus assures him that he can solve the issue himself. He then explains Lily and her team what the second team had been doing. Shortly after Lily's team left, Klaus designated Thea to lead the second team and issued a test where they would need to touch his hand before the end of the day. However, Monika, Erna, and Annette were notorious in their respective academies for having poor teamwork. Consulting with Klaus, Thea revealed that she wanted to become a spy after being saved once by Klaus' superior, Hearth. Klaus advised that Thea should be more direct with her teammates to get them to work together. She used her ability to discern people's desires to win over Erna and Annette, though she is troubled at how childlike the amnesiac Annette's desires are. Thea attempted to lure Klaus into a trap, only to learn that Monika had already pulled off her own plan, forcing Klaus to shake her hand after she sabotaged all of the mansion's faucets while using the others as a diversion. Klaus decides to take Lily to look for Thea's team while the others take care of his other missions. Meanwhile, Thea's team are relaxing at a swimming pool when Annette is suddenly hugged by a woman claiming to be her mother. Part II: As Klaus and Lily head out to search for Thea's team, Klaus learns that spies from Lylat and Galgad recently had a covert battle in the city, making the situation dangerous. At the pool, the woman identifies herself as Matilda Barbet, a mechanic from Lylat. While she doesn't intend to hand Annette over, Thea does agree to let Matilda have dinner with Annette in hopes that Annette connecting with her mother will give her a stronger motivation to be a spy. However, during the dinner, Thea and her team notice Matilda is being followed and help her elude her pursuers. Matilda admits that she is being chased by debt collectors because her toolbox was stolen and she was tricked into pawning off her passport in an attempt to get it back. Thea and her team decide to retrieve her toolbox and return it to Matilda. However, Monika reveals that she recovered Matilda's passport but the name on it doesn't match Matilda's, meaning she is a Galgad spy. Part III: Klaus and Lily arrive in the city, where they notice a covert but heavy military presence and meet their leader, Welter Barth from Military Intelligence. Welter informs them that the military is hunting a Galgad spy loose in the city, and Klaus already suspects the spy has a connection to Annette. Earlier, Thea and Monika come to a disagreement over whether to turn Matilda in to the military or not. Monika gives Thea and Annette one more day to come to a final decision before she reports to Klaus. Thea and Annette meet Matilda again, and she admits that she became a spy in order to support to Annette, and promises to retire if she can escape the Republic with her. Thea recalls the time she was saved by Hearth and how she wanted to become a hero like her, and both she and Annette decide to save Matilda. Thea and Monika then have a confrontation, and Thea is able to figure out that Monika is secretly in love with somebody in Lamplight. An embarrassed Monika agrees to go with Thea's plan to keep her secret, but warns that somebody will eventually take advantage of Lamplight's kindness. The next day, Thea assures Matilda that they will help her escape the country if she promises to retire as a spy. However, it appears that Matilda is actually manipulating Thea and her team. Part IV: Thea and her team plan to smuggle Matilda out of the country by ship. Meanwhile, Klaus and Lily investigate a murder scene where the thieves who had targeted Matilda had all been killed. Klaus figures out that Matilda is manipulating Thea's team, but decides to prioritize neutralizing the Galgad agent sent to back her up. Meanwhile, the backup agent White Spider meets Matilda, and she admits she doesn't truly love Annette and is actually responsible for her amnesia through repeated beatings. That night, White Spider attempts to snipe Thea but is stopped by Klaus, who recognizes him as a member of Serpent and the sniper responsible for killing Guido. Meanwhile, Monika distracts the military while Thea and the others get Matilda to a shipping container, but Thea realizes too late that Matilda is manipulating them and has no choice but to let her go. White Spider also manages to barely escape Klaus by using a bomb as a distraction. Afterwards, Klaus tracks down Annette, as he has figured out that Annette already knew Matilda was lying and manipulated everybody to ensure Matilda's death, killing her with her own bomb. Klaus praises Annette, as she possesses the ruthlessness the rest of Lamplight lacks. As Lamplight returns home, Klaus encourages an embarrassed Thea that she can atone for her mistake by succeeding in her next mission.
17	5	"File: Glint Monika"; Transliteration: "Fairu "Hyojin" no Monika" (Japanese: File《氷刃》のモニカ)	Taichi Yoshizawa	Momoko Murakami	Minoru Ōhara	August 10, 2023
Klaus, Lily, and Thea's team return to the mansion and reunite with the others, with Thea complimenting Monika as a genius. Two months earlier during the first Impossible Mission, Monika was tasked with getting close to electrical engineer Jordan Cupca through his son Mattel to collect more intel on Endy Laboratory. She manages to befriend Mattel after saving him from bullies, and agrees to help teach him self defense techniques. Monika recalls her past as an artist's daughter, and how she can easily copy skills but couldn't find any passion for art so she became a spy. However, during training, she was confronted by an expert spy who warned her about lacking passion in spycraft, causing Monika to lose motivation and wash out from her academy. Monika discovers that Jordan was collecting evidence of Galgad's inhumane experiments, but he and Mattel are arrested by Galgad counterintelligence agents. Monika considers leaving the family to their fate, but recalling her friends in Lamplight spurs her to rescue Jordan and Mattel and help them defect to the Din Republic, with Mattel wishing to be spy like Monika. In the present, Klaus recalls how the expert spy, who was a member of Inferno, passed over Monika for membership into Inferno due to her lack of passion, and Klaus remarks that people like Monika can change for the better.
18	6	"File: Dreamspeaker Thea"; Transliteration: "Fairu "Yumegatari" no Tia" (Japanese: File《夢語》のティア)	Takafumi Fujii	Momoko Murakami	Minoru Ōhara	August 17, 2023
After a failed attempt to seduce Klaus, Thea wonders if anybody else in Lamplight are interested in romance. Sara then approaches her, seeking advice on how to deal with a boy named Dominic Maura who keeps sending her love letters despite her turning down his advances. Thea suggests that Sara go on a date with Dominic to confirm if she really has feelings for him or not. During the date, all of the Lamplight quietly watch over Sara, but after it appears that Dominic has genuine feelings for Sara, most of them lose interest and leave. Thea, however, checks Dominic's desires and has Lamplight investigate him. In truth, Dominic is actually a con artist by the name of Tarik Pupke who specializes in romance scams, and he was planning to steal Sara's dog to resell to a rich buyer. With all of Lamplight is angered, Thea takes the lead to bring Tarik to justice. With Thea's help, Sara is able to turn the tables and seduce Tarik instead, convincing him to admit his crimes. Afterwards, Klaus offers to take Sara on a date to encourage her desire for romance. Thea confides to Monika that she washed out of her academy because she was too skilled at seduction and had too many improper relationships with the school staff, all in an effort to emulate Hearth. Later that night, Monika asks Klaus why Thea's seduction attempts don't work on him, and he explains that Thea needs to make eye contact with her target for her ability to work, which he has been avoiding all this time. Thea then attempts to seduce Klaus by having Grete dress up as a Playboy Bunny, only to have Klaus bluntly turn her down.
19	7	"File: Forgetter Annette"; Transliteration: "Fairu "Bōga" no Anetto" (Japanese: File《忘我》のアネット)	Tatsuya Sasaki	Momoko Murakami	Shōta Imai	August 24, 2023
Listening to Klaus' request, C assigns Lamplight a relatively simple mission to investigate a local restaurant where Galgad agents are suspected of using it as a front to deal drugs. Klaus assigns the mission to Annette due to her request to earn some extra money for a project she's working on. While the rest of Lamplight are skeptical that the normally chaotic Annette is capable of focusing on the mission, they are shocked at how competent she is posing as a waitress. Sara explains that Annette is actually very talented and adaptable, but only displays it when she's motivated enough. Eventually, Lamplight discovers that the drug ring is using bathroom graffiti as a system to deal cannabis. They apprehend the waiter running the ring, but have no leads on the real mastermind. Later that night, Annette ambushes a customer who had harassed her in the restaurant earlier, who coincidentally happens to be the spy masterminding the drug ring. Klaus apprehends the spy and chastises Annette that eliminating problem customers isn't part of a waitress' duties. The next day, Klaus receives a new mission from C. He then informs Lamplight that he will be taking the entire team with him to the United States of Mouzaia to track down Serpent.
20	8	"Mission: Dreamspeaker"; Transliteration: "Misshon "Yumegatari"" (Japanese: MISSION《夢語》)	Yasushi Murotani	Kazuho Hyōdō	Hiroyuki Shimazu	August 31, 2023
21	9	"Mission: Dreamspeaker"; Transliteration: "Misshon "Yumegatari"" (Japanese: MISSION《夢語》)	Shin'ichi Tatsuta	Noboru Kimura	Hiroyuki Shimazu	September 7, 2023
22	10	"Mission: Dreamspeaker"; Transliteration: "Misshon "Yumegatari"" (Japanese: MISSION《夢語》)	Shōta Imai	Keiichiro Kawaguchi	Tomoki Kobayashi	September 14, 2023
23	11	"Mission: Dreamspeaker"; Transliteration: "Misshon "Yumegatari"" (Japanese: MISSION《夢語》)	Takafumi Fujii	Shinichi Inotsume	Itsuro Kawasaki	September 21, 2023
Part I: White Spider meets with fellow Serpent member Purple Ant in the city of Mitouza in the United States. White Spider explains that the Tolfa Economic Conference will begin soon, which will attract spies from all over the world, and orders Purple Ant to eliminate them all, including Klaus. Meanwhile, Klaus assigns Thea to lead the mission, but she remains self conscious about her failures to deal with Corpse and Matilda. After Klaus and Thea visit Corpse at a secret prison, Klaus realizes that Annette has sabotaged their car in an effort to get him to admit defeat. Klaus if forced to ditch the car where he is ambushed by Lamplight, but he is narrowly able to win due to calling the police ahead of time, forcing Lamplight to flee. However, Klaus is impressed with their growth and tells them their next mission will also double as their graduation exam. Realizing Lamplight was able to pull off such an ambitious plan without her involvement, Thea grows even more self conscious. Klaus and Lamplight then arrive in the United States and quickly infiltrate various areas of Mitouza to gather intelligence, though they also learn that foreign spies are being killed. It is also revealed that they had brought Corpse with them as their prisoner in order to identify Serpent. Part II: Lamplight continues their intelligence gathering, though Klaus warns that numerous foreign spies have been killed so far. Grete's main worry is that since Lamplight's training is focused on attacking Klaus, they have a lot of experience being on the offensive but little training to defend themselves against enemy spies. During the night, a politician's chauffeur named Barron attempts to drug Sibylla, but she thwarts the attempt and chases Barron into an abandoned building, which turns out to be a trap. Fortunately, Erna arrives to assist Sibylla against Barron. Meanwhile, Lily is framed for a murder and the police attempt to arrest her, and she is rescued by the intervention of Annette. Monika is lured into a high stakes game of darts by a woman named Miranda, and is narrowly able to defeat her by deflecting her dart. However, instead of giving any information, Miranda stabs herself in the neck with a dart. In a flashback, Purple Ant boasts to a wounded spy that he has filled Mitario with his "Worker Ants", regular citizens who he has brainwashed into his own army of sleeper agents. Part III: Monika manages to thwart Miranda's suicide attempt by knocking her unconscious. Meanwhile, Sibylla and Erna are able to defeat Barron, but upon learning that Barron was coerced by Purple Ant under threats to his family, Sibylla prevents him from letting himself bleed to death. However, despite their successes, Lamplight are ambushed by additional assassins. In the flashback, Purple Ant boasts to Hearth that he has hundreds of expendable Worker Ants in Mitario that he can use to overwhelm enemy spies, and then shoots her in the femoral artery. In the present, Grete heads out to support the others, leaving Thea to wonder how she can help in the situation. Annette then informs Thea of a rumor of a black haired woman assuring the Worker Ants a hero will save them, and Lily suggests Thea take advantage of that. Thea then confronts Corpse, who offers to help her since unlike the other Worker Ants, he didn't commit suicide. Thea frees Corpse, who immediately attacks and captures her before turning her over to Purple Ant. Part IV: Purple Ant boasts to Thea that he killed Hearth six months ago after she was betrayed by Guido, though Hearth promised that Klaus and Thea would return to avenge her. However, Thea reveals that she figured out Hearth's plan, so she mimicked Hearth's voice to break Corpse's brainwashing and turn him to her side, and had him capture her a ruse to lure Purple Ant into the open. Klaus then arrives to back up Thea and Purple Ant flees. After being cornered, Purple assembles his most elite operatives, the General Ants. Corpse and the rest of Lamplight then arrive to even the odds, and a all out battle breaks out. Corpse sacrifices himself to protect Thea, while Klaus reveals he has learned all of the skills Lamplight demonstrated trying to attack him, easily defeating the General Ants and capturing Purple Ant. Lamplight leaves the United States after making an agreement with the US government to cover up Purple Ant's murders by pinning them on Lily's cover identity. Thea then mentions to Klaus that Hearth promised to give her a present if they ever met again, and he shows her a secret compartment in Hearth's room containing and key and a message congratulating Thea. Thea then cries in Klaus' chest, finally feeling relief that she was able to live up to Hearth's expectations.
24	12	"File: Flower Garden Lily"; Transliteration: "Fairu "Hanazono" no Rirī" (Japanese: File《花園》のリリィ)	Satoshi Saga	Shinichi Inotsume	Keiichiro Kawaguchi	September 28, 2023
Thea manages to find the box Hearth's key unlocks, but only finds an incomplete note inside it. Curious how Klaus knew to recruit her into Lamplight, Thea tries to reconstruct the note by writing numerous variations, including one that says "Klaus loves you." However, she accidentally drops the note in Lily's room. Lily discovers the note and gets flustered, and through a series of misunderstandings the note is spread around the mansion, leading Erna, Monika, Sibylla, and Sara to believe the note is directed at them instead. Klaus then announces he will need one partner to accompany him on his next mission, causing the girls to compete for the position. Meanwhile, Grete assists Thea with deciphering Hearth's note, and with some information provided by Olivia, Grete deduces it really says "Klaus saved you." At the time Thea was rescued by Hearth as a child, Hearth had already arranged for Klaus to train her as a spy to help her deal with her trauma. Upon returning, Thea clears up the misunderstanding about the note with the others, but she admits the whole situation lightened her mood. Klaus quietly observes and concludes that making Lily the team leader was the right choice, due to her ability to make others smile. Afterwards, Klaus congratulates Lamplight for officially graduating, and informs them they will focus on defeating Serpent, who appear to have gone rogue to pursue their own goals apart from Galgad's.

=== Stage play ===
During the "Fantasia Bunko Daikanshasai Online 2023", a stage play adaptation was announced. It run for 13 performances at the Ginza Hakuhinkan Theater from January 20–28, 2024.

== Reception ==
Rebecca Silverman from Anime News Network praised the story as fun and interesting, while criticizing what she felt were authorial stumbles trying to pull everything together. Demelza from Anime UK News praised the first volume as well, as she felt it was unique compared to most other light novels available in English. Satoshi Maejima from The Asahi Shimbun also praised the story, while criticizing the main female protagonist as underdeveloped.

In the Kono Light Novel ga Sugoi! guidebook, the series ranked second in the bunkobon category in 2021. As of February 23, 2023, the series has sold 1,100,000 units between the digital and print versions.

== See also ==
- My Friend's Little Sister Has It In for Me!, another light novel series illustrated by the same illustrator
