= ICEkunion =

South Korean publishing company

ICEkunion (Korean: 아이스쿠니온) is a South Korean publishing company. Created by Sigongsa, Seoul Munhwasa, and Haksan Publishing it published South Korean manhwa in the United States. The firm's industry experience come from Studio ICE. Titles were licensed from manhwa publishing companies that originally sold them in South Korea in the Korean language. According to an interview conducted by ICv2, the original creators themselves were involved in the adaptation process for the English-language markets. In July 2007 it was announced through PW Comic Week that ICEkunion would be absorbed by Yen Press. Titles released through ICEkunion were re-released by Yen Press beginning in Q2 2008. Manhwa bearing the ICEkunion logo remained in stores.

ICEkunion's former editorial director Ju-Youn Lee (now Yen Press' senior editor) is quoted with saying "I asked them, would they like to join Yen Press with all the resources of Hachette behind the titles. They decided it would be a better chance to take risks with Hachette". Lee said that while the ICEkunion co-venture was a good project, "We didn't have any staff working in U.S., and we had our limits doing work from Korea".

== List of published titles ==
- The 11th Cat
- Angel Diary
- The Antique Gift Shop
- Bring It On! by Baek hye kyung
- Chocolat by Shin Ji Sang
- Comic by Ha Si-hyun
- Cynical Orange
- Forest of Gray City
- Heavenly Executioner Chiwoo
- Hissing
- Moon Boy
- One Thousand and One Nights
- Real Lies by Lee Shi-Young
