= Demon King =

Demon King may refer to:

- The Demon King (album), a 2014 release by Demonic Resurrection
- Demon King (Doraemon), a character in the film Doraemon: Nobita's New Great Adventure into the Underworld
- Demon King of Chaos, a character in Water Margin, one of the Four Great Classical Novels of Chinese literature
- Demon King Chestra, a character in the fantasy adventure manga Violinist of Hameln
- Demon King of Confusion, a character in the Chinese classical novel Journey to the West
- Demon King Daimao, a Japanese light novel series
- Great Demon King Koopa, the main antagonist of Nintendo's Mario franchise, known as Bowser in English media
- Ganondorf, also known as the Demon King, the main antagonist of Nintendo’s Legend of Zelda franchise
- Demon King Piccolo, a character in the Dragon Ball manga series
- Ox-Demon-King, a character in the 16th century Chinese novel Journey to the West
- Diary of a Demon King, a manhwa (Korean comic)
- Rage of a Demon King, a 1997 novel by Raymond E. Feist
- Oda Nobunaga (1534–1582), Japanese samurai and warlord

== See also ==
- Agaliarept, a demon king in two 1980s computer games by Level 9 Computing in their Middle Earth trilogy
- Balor, a character in Irish mythology
- Dark Lord, a powerful villain or antagonist with evil henchmen
- Demon Lord (disambiguation)
- Finn Bálor, nicknamed the “Demon King” in WWE
- Fomortiis, a character described as a demon king, and the main antagonist of the Game Boy Advance game Fire Emblem: The Sacred Stones
- King Banasura, a demon king said to have ruled over Banapur, Odisha State, India
- Majūō, a 1995 video game
- Prince of Darkness
- Ravana, a demon king in the Hindu epic Ramayana
- Satan
