= Infernax =

2022 video game

- Developer: Berzerk Studio
- Publisher: The Arcade Crew
- Director: Étienne Jean
- Producer: Simon Lachance
- Programmers: François-Xavier Vézina; Shayne Wheeler
- Artists: Émilie Bourget; Marc-Antoine Jean
- Writers: Hunter Bond; Mike Ducarme
- Composer: Jason Létourneau
- Engine: Unity
- Platforms: Nintendo Switch; PlayStation 4; Windows; Xbox One; Xbox Series X/S
- Release: February 14, 2022
- Genres: Metroidvania; Side-scrolling video game
- Modes: Single-player, multiplayer

Infernax is a 2D Metroidvania video game developed by Berzerk Studio and published by The Arcade Crew. It was released on February 14, 2022, for Nintendo Switch, PlayStation 4, Windows, Xbox One, and Xbox Series X/S. The game follows the young Duke Alcedor, who finds his homeland of Upel overrun by monsters upon returning from the Crusades. Infernax received generally favorable reviews. An update to the game, Deux or Die, was released on April 5, 2023, in which another player can join in as Cervul the Squire.

== Gameplay ==
Alcedor attacking an enemy with his mace

Infernax is set in a dark fantasy world where the player controls Alcedor, while the second player controls Cervul; both find their homeland overrun by a sect of satanists and hordes of monsters upon returning from the Crusades. Alcedor wields a shield and a mace, while Cervul wields throwing axes, a crossbow, a pavise (shield), and a banner, along with using bandages to keep himself and Alcedor healed up; all of these weapons and armor can be upgraded as the player progresses through the game. Players can also obtain a variety of magical spells, with some being able to be upgraded. Players earn gold and experience points by defeating enemies, with gold being used to buy upgrades for equipment while experience points allow players to increase their health, mana (Alcedor only), or attack power.

Players can also visit several villages scattered throughout the game in order to buy items from shops or accept quests from villagers. Villages and their residents are also affected by the choices that players make throughout the game. The goal of Infernax is to defeat the enemies within five different castles and destroy the gems inside of them. Once players destroy all five gems, the last castle – the Urzon Citadel – is unlocked, containing the final boss of the game. Infernax features multiple endings, with the actions of the player determining the ending they receive:

== Plot ==
Tired of the constant fighting and bloodshed of the Crusades, the young duke Alcedor returns to his homeland of Upel. However, the ancient tome known as the Necronomicon, a book written by a madman rumored to hold great power, has been brought to Upel around a year before Alcedor's return. As a result, hordes of monsters have been ravaging the duchy, with Alcedor having to help defend the town of Darsov from an attack upon his return. Alcedor and the town's defenders successfully drive off the attackers, though one of the monsters manages to flee.

After tracking down and slaying the monster outside the Urzon Citadel, Alcedor finds that the way inside is blocked by a magical seal. Father Henry, a priest from Darsov, explains that Alcedor must track down and destroy five crystal orbs scattered across Upel that keep the seal in place by killing the elder demons that hold them. Once all five crystal orbs have been destroyed, the Urzon Citadel will be unlocked, allowing Alcedor to enter and encounter a powerful demon known as Belphegor.

Additionally, Alcedor will also encounter Robert, the leader of a demon-worshiping cult that seeks to take over the duchy of Upel. Alcedor has the option of either joining Robert and the cult, or killing them. Joining the cult will change Alcedor's weapon from a mace and shield to a greatsword, Cervul's axes to bombs, his crossbow to poisoned daggers, his banner to an eye-summoning monster (eyelord), with his shield becoming magic and capable of casting a large fire beam which can be recharged by collecting enemy projectiles with the shield's magic. Additionally, joining the cult gives Alcedor the opportunity to join the cult's attack on Darsov, slaying the town's defenders along with Father Henry.

The game has multiple endings that depend upon the player's choices throughout the story regarding the game's morality system. The endings are as follows:

- If Alcedor enters the Urzon Citadel with a positive morality but does not possess the Necronomicon, then he will engage in battle with Belphegor. Alcedor defeats Belphegor, but succumbs to his wounds. A statue of Alcedor is then erected in the town of Darsov as the people come to remember their fallen leader. This ending is known as The Path of the Martyr.
- If Alcedor enters the Urzon Citadel with a negative morality but does not possess the Necronomicon, then he will engage in battle with Belphegor. Alcedor defeats Belphegor and survives the battle, but turns into a zombie hunted by the people of Upel. This ending is known as The Path of the Wretch.
- If Alcedor starts off with a negative morality but shifts to a positive morality before entering the Urzon Citadel and does not possess the Necronomicon, then he will engage in battle with Belphegor. Alcedor defeats Belphegor, but succumbs to his wounds. The people of Upel will regard that while there was evil in Alcedor's heart, his selfless sacrifice saved the land. This ending is known as The Path of Redemption.
- If Alcedor enters the Urzon Citadel with a positive morality and possesses the Necronomicon, he will use the Necronomicon to open a portal to Hell when a giant hand reaches through the portal and crushes Belphegor's head, dragging him through as Alcedor follows. Alcedor then fights a giant demon known as Baphomet and slays him, ending the demonic invasion. After burning the Necronomicon with the help of Father Henry, Alcedor gathers an army of knights and sets out to cleanse the monster threat once and for all. This ending is known as The Path of the Righteous.
- If Alcedor joins the cult and agrees to submit to Robert after laying siege to Darsov, he will become Robert's right-hand man as the cult takes over the duchy of Upel. This ending is known as The Path of Submission.
- If Alcedor joins the cult and refuses to submit to Robert after laying siege to Darsov, he will kill Robert and take the Necronomicon for himself, becoming the cult's new leader. He then enters the Urzon Citadel and uses the Necronomicon to open a portal to Hell when a pair of tentacles grab Belphegor and drag him through. Alcedor then assumes a demon form and flies through the portal, fighting a powerful demon named Abbadon. After defeating him, Alcedor uses the Necronomicon's power to bend the world to his will. Having mastered the Necronomicon, he becomes a nightmarish dark lord with demonic powers and founds an empire feared throughout the kingdoms of both Earth and Hell. This ending is known as The Path of Evil.
- If Alcedor possesses the Necronomicon and brings it to a priest named Gregor while also having at least 95% of the game's demonology filled out (which requires completing any path that ends in a battle with Belphegor, the Path of the Righteous and the Path of Evil, and also defeat almost any enemy type in order to earn demonology entries), Gregor will send Alcedor to an apocalyptic future where the descendants of Gregor's order will give Alcedor a machine gun. Alcedor takes the gun and fights through a horde of cybernetically enhanced monsters, culminating in a battle against a massive cyborg demon named Azazel. After defeating Azazel, Alcedor stays in the future and sets off on a motorcycle. This ending is known as The Path of the Future. This ending is also a reference to the Contra franchise.
- If Alcedor kills the first monster after landing on the shores of Upel but heads back to the boat, the sailor will ask if Alcedor wants to leave. If Alcedor agrees, the game will end. This ending is known as The Path of the Coward.
- If Alcedor chooses to sleep at an inn five times in a row, a cutscene will play showing Alcedor sleeping peacefully while demons attack in the background as the credits roll. This ending is known as The Path of Drowsiness. This ending is also a reference to the ending of Super Mario Bros. 2.

== Development ==
Infernax was developed by Canadian game studio Berzerk Studio. The game was originally designed as an online Flash game. The game was crowdfunded through Kickstarter in 2015. In January 2020, a game demo of Infernax was released at PAX South 2020, revealing the overall plot of the game. Infernax was officially announced through a trailer on October 21, 2021, with a release date of Q1 2022 on PC and consoles. On January 11, 2022, The Arcade Crew released a trailer, revealing the game's release date of February 14, 2022. On February 14, 2022, Infernax released for Nintendo Switch, PlayStation 4, Windows, Xbox One, and Xbox Series X/S. The game was also added to the Xbox Game Pass library on the same day.

An update to the game, called Deux or Die, was released on April 5, 2023, in which a second player can control Cervul the Squire, who chooses to be loyal to Alcedor, right or wrong.

Infernax was primarily influenced by Zelda II: The Adventure of Link and Castlevania II: Simon's Quest, but also took inspiration from the accounts of knights such as Jean de Joinville and historical accounts from the Battle of Agincourt. The team also drew inspiration from the heavy metal genre, influenced by bands such as Mercyful Fate to "fit the feeling we wanted for the game".

== Reception ==
Reception

Aggregate score
Aggregator	Score
Metacritic	PC: 84/100; PS4: 83/100; XSXS: 81/100; NS: 84/100

Review scores
Publication	Score
Destructoid	8/10
Game Informer	8/10
Hardcore Gamer	4/5
Nintendo Life	8/10
Nintendo World Report	9/10
TouchArcade	4.5/5

Infernax received "generally favorable" reviews according to review aggregator Metacritic.

Hardcore Gamer's James Cunningham described Infernax as a "fantastic throwback to 8-bit gaming". Cunningham stated that the difficulty of the game was appealing, writing that Infernax "knows when to go hard and when to back off".

Shaun Musgrave of TouchArcade praised the solid gameplay mechanics, and said that the fundamentals were "done properly". Musgrave recommended the game to those who enjoyed exploratory 2D platformers. Jordan Rudek from Nintendo World Report gave the game a 9/10, calling the game's pacing "excellent" and the gameplay "simple, but fun". However, Rudek criticized the initial difficulty curve of the game, and said that boss fights "seem much easier than some of the platforming". Game Informer's Wesley LeBlanc scored the game an 8/10, commending the uniqueness of the bosses, the challenging gameplay, describing it as a "fun Castlevania-inspired design". However, LeBlanc felt that the layout of some of the dungeons was frustrating.

Destructoid reviewer Chris Moyse rated the game 8/10, praising the game's challenge, the chiptune score, and the visuals, describing them as "neat". Moyse criticized the slim cast of characters, and the game's story, calling it "relatively thin". Stuart Gipp of Nintendo Life lauded the game's challenge, the visuals, and the Metroidvania structure of the game. Gipp felt that familiarity let Infernax down, but wrote that it was done in a way that "you won't really care unless you're desperate for a completely fresh experience".
