= Dark Lord (disambiguation) =

A Dark lord is a powerful, villainous stock character that appears in the fantasy genre.

Dark Lord may also refer to:

== Fictional characters ==
- Dark Lord of the Sith, a title held by the main antagonists in the fictional Star Wars universe
- Ming the Merciless, a comic book character and archenemy of Flash Gordon
- Morgoth, the main antagonist of J. R. R. Tolkien's Middle-earth works
- Sauron, the main antagonist of The Lord of the Rings by J. R. R. Tolkien
- Lord Voldemort, the main antagonist in the Harry Potter novel series by J. K. Rowling, called Dark Lord by his Death Eaters
- Dark Lord Chuckles the Silly Piggy, a character from Dave the Barbarian
- Ganon or Dark Lord Ganondorf, the main antagonist of The Legend of Zelda series
- Mordru or The Dark Lord, a supervillain in DC Comics
- Dark Lord, a villain from Flint the Time Detective
- Darklords of Helgedad, antagonists in the Lone Wolf gamebooks
- Dark Lord, the antagonist in the Doom and its sequel Doom Eternal
- Dracula (Castlevania), known as the Dark Lord in the Castlevania series
- Diablo, the titular main antagonist of the Diablo series
- Darkseid, an alien despot from DC Comics
- Darklord (Ravenloft), a ruler of a domain of the Ravenloft campaign setting for Dungeons & Dragons
- The Darkling Lords, antagonists from Visionaries: Knights of the Magical Light
- The Dark Overlords of the Universe, characters from Howard the Duck
- Dark Lord, the main antagonist in the game Miitopia
- The Dark Lord, a character in the Animator vs. Animation series created and animated by Alan Becker

== Other ==
- Dark Lord, a famous Russian Imperial Stout beer from Three Floyds Brewing
- Devil or Satan, the personification of evil in certain religions (see also Prince of Darkness)

== See also ==
- Dark Lady (disambiguation)
- Dark Lord of Derkholm, a novel by Diana Wynne Jones
- Darklords, a Dungeons & Dragons accessory
- Demon Lord (disambiguation)
- Evil Emperor (disambiguation)
- Evil Overlord List
- Good Lord (disambiguation)
- Prince of Darkness (disambiguation)
