= Dark Queen =

Dark Queen may refer to:

- Dark Queen, the recurring main antagonist of the Battletoads video game series
- Dark Queen, a main antagonist in the video game Sonic and the Black Knight
- Queen of Shadows, or Dark Queen, the antagonist of the 2005 fantasy film MirrorMask
- Dark Queen (song), a song by American rapper Lil Uzi Vert

== See also ==
- Dark Lord (disambiguation)
