= Anti-corporate activism =

Anti-corporate activism is activism directed against the private sector, particularly larger corporations. It is based on the belief that the activities and impacts of big business are detrimental to the public good and the democratic process.

== Disagreements with corporations ==
International trade and financial deregulation facilitated corporate globalization. As more economies have embraced free markets and deregulation, the power and autonomy of corporations have grown.

Opponents of corporate globalization believe that governments need greater powers to control the market, limit or reduce corporate power, and eliminate rising income inequality. Usually on the political left, anti-corporate globalization activists rail against corporate power and advocate for reduced income gaps and improved economic equity.

Anti-corporate activists believe that large multinational corporations gained too much influence by hiring lobbyists to advance their political and economic agendas worldwide and to increase corporate profits.

== Counter-arguments ==
The defenders of corporations, such as Ron Arnold, highlight that governments legislate in ways that restrict the actions of corporations and that lawbreaking companies and executives are routinely caught and punished, usually in the form of monetary fines.

== Alliances ==
Anti-corporate activists often ally with other activists, such as environmental activists or animal-rights activists, in condemning the business practices of organizations such as McDonald's Corporation (McLibel) and forestry company Gunns Limited (Gunns 20).

In recent years, the number of books (Naomi Klein's 2000 No Logo being a well-known example) and films on the subject has increased, such as The Corporation, which has to a certain extent supported anti-corporate politics.

== Art activism ==
An artist critical of sociopolitical agendas in business is conceptualist Hans Haacke.

== Anti-corporate web sites ==
In June 2008, Condé Nast Publications released an article entitled "The Secret Seven", which listed the top seven anti-corporate web sites. These included: WikiLeaks, Mini-Microsoft, Wal-Mart Watch, Brenda Priddy and Company (automotive spy photos), AppleInsider and MacRumors. In 2020, a group called "Save our Elders from Corporate Abuse" was formed on Facebook. The page tried to report and expose businesses that trap senior citizens into predatory loans, perpetual billing for products, or other schemes.

== Rise of anti-corporate globalization ==
On November 30, 1999, nearly fifty thousand people protested the WTO meetings in Seattle, which disrupted and ended the meetings. Participants communicated their strategies through emails, websites, and other platforms. Some new anti-globalization networks have emerged.

In the United States, anti-corporate globalization movements reemerged after less attention was given to the war in Iraq, resulting in an increase in mass mobilizations.

== See also ==
- Anti-consumerism – Sociopolitical ideology involving intentionally and meaningfully reducing consumption
- Anti-globalization – Worldwide political movement against multinational corporations
- Bernie Sanders – American politician and activist (born 1941)
- Jeremy Corbyn – British politician (born 1949)
- Corporatocracy – Society controlled by business corporations
- Culture jamming – Form of protest to subvert media culture
- Evil corporation – Corporation that ignores social responsibility
- Lobbying in the United States
- McLibel case – Legal action against and by activists
- Multinational Monitor – Defunct magazine covering corporate accountability and related topics
- Occupy movement – 2011–2012 protests against socioeconomic inequality
- POCLAD – The Program On Corporations, Law, and Democracy
- Public Citizen – Think tank and progressive advocacy group
- Ralph Nader – American lawyer and activist (born 1934)
- Criticisms of corporations
