= Cognitive computing =

Concept of "brainlike" computing

Cognitive computing refers to technology platforms that, broadly speaking, are based on the scientific disciplines of artificial intelligence and signal processing. These platforms encompass machine learning, reasoning, natural language processing, speech recognition and vision (object recognition), human–computer interaction, dialog and narrative generation, among other technologies.

== Definition ==
At present, there is no widely agreed upon definition for cognitive computing in either academia or industry.

In general, the term cognitive computing has been used to refer to new hardware and/or software that mimics the functioning of the human brain (2004). In this sense, cognitive computing is a new type of computing with the goal of more accurate models of how the human brain/mind senses, reasons, and responds to stimulus. Cognitive computing applications link data analysis and adaptive page displays (AUI) to adjust content for a particular type of audience. As such, cognitive computing hardware and applications strive to be more affective and more influential by design.

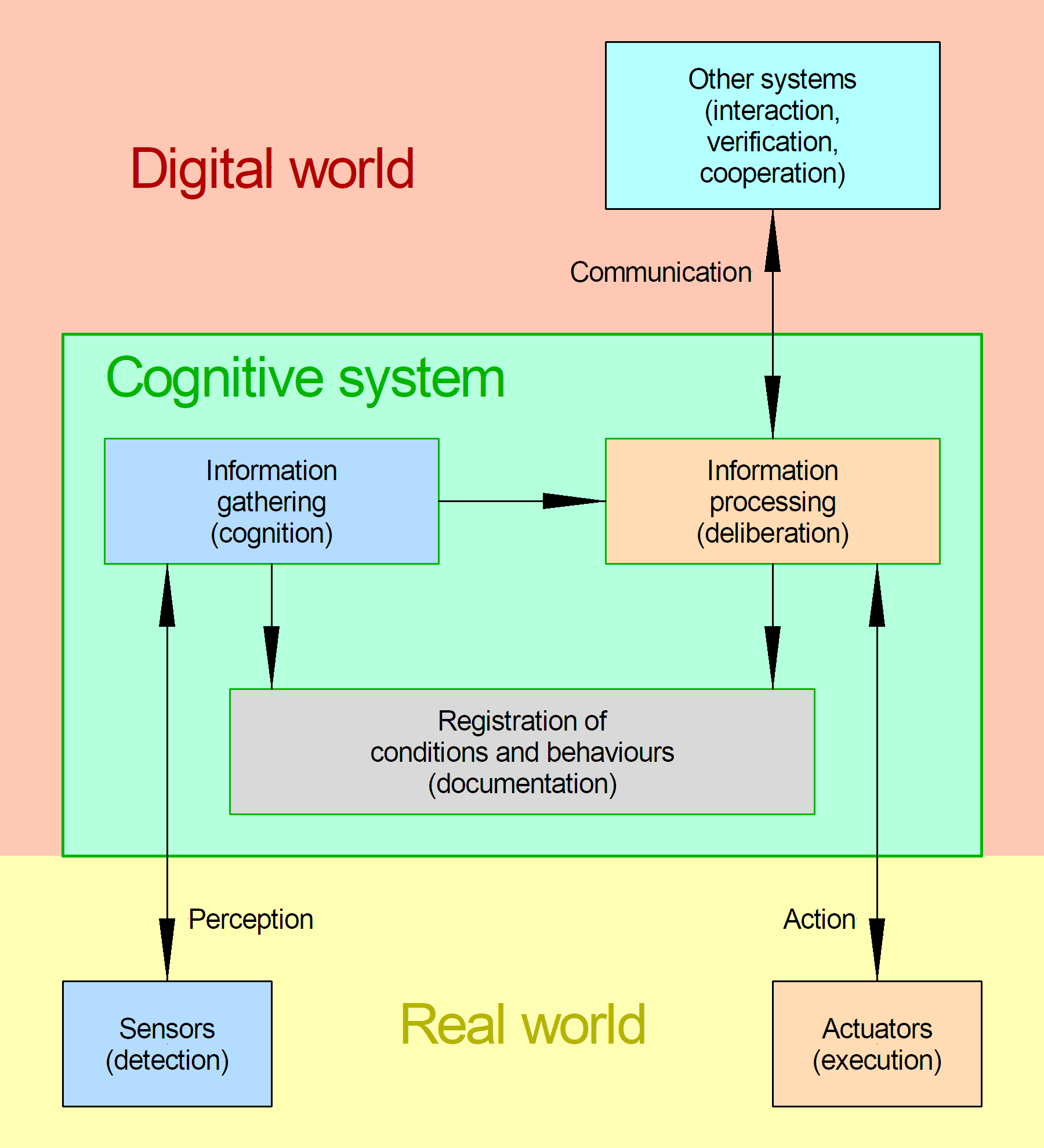
Basic scheme of a cognitive system. With sensors, such as keyboards, touchscreens, cameras, microphones or temperature sensors, signals from the real world environment can be detected. For perception, these signals are recognised by the cognition of the cognitive system and converted into digital information. This information can be documented and is processed. The result of deliberation can also be documented and is used to control and execute an action in the real world environment with the help of actuators, such as engines, loudspeakers, displays or air conditioners for example.

The term "cognitive system" also applies to any artificial construct able to perform a cognitive process where a cognitive process is the transformation of data, information, knowledge, or wisdom to a new level in the DIKW Pyramid. While many cognitive systems employ techniques having their origination in artificial intelligence research, cognitive systems, themselves, may not be artificially intelligent. For example, a neural network trained to recognize cancer on an MRI scan may achieve a higher success rate than a human doctor. This system is certainly a cognitive system but is not artificially intelligent.

Cognitive systems may be engineered to feed on dynamic data in real-time, or near real-time, and may draw on multiple sources of information, including both structured and unstructured digital information, as well as sensory inputs (visual, gestural, auditory, or sensor-provided).

== Cognitive analytics ==
Cognitive computing-branded technology platforms typically specialize in the processing and analysis of large, unstructured datasets.

== Applications ==
Education
Even if cognitive computing can not take the place of teachers, it can still be a heavy driving force in the education of students. Cognitive computing being used in the classroom is applied by essentially having an assistant that is personalized for each individual student. This cognitive assistant can relieve the stress that teachers face while teaching students, while also enhancing the student's learning experience over all. Teachers may not be able to pay each and every student individual attention, this being the place that cognitive computers fill the gap. Some students may need a little more help with a particular subject. For many students, Human interaction between student and teacher can cause anxiety and can be uncomfortable. With the help of Cognitive Computer tutors, students will not have to face their uneasiness and can gain the confidence to learn and do well in the classroom. While a student is in class with their personalized assistant, this assistant can develop various techniques, like creating lesson plans, to tailor and aid the student and their needs.
Healthcare
Numerous tech companies are in the process of developing technology that involves cognitive computing that can be used in the medical field. The ability to classify and identify is one of the main goals of these cognitive devices. This trait can be very helpful in the study of identifying carcinogens. This cognitive system that can detect would be able to assist the examiner in interpreting countless numbers of documents in a lesser amount of time than if they did not use Cognitive Computer technology. This technology can also evaluate information about the patient, looking through every medical record in depth, searching for indications that can be the source of their problems.
Commerce
Together with Artificial Intelligence, it has been used in warehouse management systems to collect, store, organize and analyze all related supplier data. All these aims at improving efficiency, enabling faster decision-making, monitoring inventory and fraud detection
Human Cognitive Augmentation
In situations where humans are using or working collaboratively with cognitive systems, called a human/cog ensemble, results achieved by the ensemble are superior to results obtainable by the human working alone. Therefore, the human is cognitively augmented. In cases where the human/cog ensemble achieves results at, or superior to, the level of a human expert then the ensemble has achieved synthetic expertise. In a human/cog ensemble, the "cog" is a cognitive system employing virtually any kind of cognitive computing technology.

Other use cases

- Speech recognition
- Sentiment analysis
- Face detection
- Risk assessment
- Fraud detection
- Behavioral recommendations

== Industry work ==
Cognitive computing in conjunction with big data and algorithms that comprehend customer needs, can be a major advantage in economic decision making.

The powers of cognitive computing and artificial intelligence hold the potential to affect almost every task that humans are capable of performing. This can negatively affect employment for humans, as there would be no such need for human labor anymore. It would also increase the inequality of wealth; the people at the head of the cognitive computing industry would grow significantly richer, while workers without ongoing, reliable employment would become less well off.

The more industries start to use cognitive computing, the more difficult it will be for humans to compete. Increased use of the technology will also increase the amount of work that AI-driven robots and machines can perform. The influence of competitive individuals in conjunction with artificial intelligence/cognitive computing has the potential to change the course of humankind.

== See also ==
- Automation
- Affective computing
- Analytics
- Artificial intelligence
- Artificial neural network
- Brain computer interface
- Cognitive computer
- Cognitive reasoning
- Cognitive science
- Enterprise cognitive system
- Semantic Web
- Social neuroscience
- Synthetic intelligence
- Usability
- Neuromorphic engineering
- AI accelerator
