= Prince of Darkness =

Prince of Darkness may refer to:

== Religion and mythology ==
- Prince of Darkness (Manichaeism), the term used by Mani for the principle of evil
- Prince of Darkness (Satan), a term used in John Milton's poem Paradise Lost referring to Satan as the embodiment of evil

== Nickname ==
- Jeremiah Hamilton (1806–1875), broker & first Black millionaire in New York.
- Ozzy Osbourne (1948–2025), British metal singer and television personality
- Miles Davis (1926–1991), jazz musician
- Bill Demchak (born 1962), American banker and CEO of PNC Financial Services
- William F. Galvin (born 1950), Secretary of the Commonwealth of Massachusetts since January 1, 1995
- Mike Jackson (British Army officer) (born 1944), Chief of British General Staff, commander of KFOR military administration of Kosovo
- Warren Kinsella (born 1960), Canadian political consultant and former PMO staffer to Prime Minister Jean Chretien
- Peter Mandelson (born 1953), former British Cabinet Minister and First Secretary of State
- Robert Novak (1931–2009), American journalist and conservative commentator
- Richard Perle (born 1941), American assistant Secretary of Defense during the Reagan administration
- Gordon Willis (1931–2014), cinematographer famous for his work on The Godfather films

== Literature ==
=== Books ===
- A Prince of Darkness, an 1884 novel by Florence Warden
- The Prince of Darkness: A Romance of the Blue Ridge, an 1861 novel by E. D. E. N. Southworth, first published in serial form as Hickory Hall; or The Outcast
- Prince of Darkness, a 1946 short story anthology co-written and edited by Gerald Verner
- Prince of Darkness and Other Stories, a 1947 short story collection by J. F. Powers
- Prince of Darkness, a 1969 novel by Barbara Mertz, writing as Barbara Michaels
- Prince of Darkness, a 1971 short story collection by Ray Russell
- Mörkrets furste, eller Djävulstornets hemlighet, a. k. a. The Prince of Darkness, a 1975 novel by Sam J. Lundwall
- The Prince of Darkness, a 1978 novel by Jean Plaidy, the fourth volume in The Plantagenet Saga
- The Prince of Darkness: Radical Evil and the Power of Good in History, a 1988 non-fiction work by Jeffrey Burton Russell
- The Prince of Darkness, a 1992 novel by Paul C. Doherty, the fifth volume in the Hugh Corbett series
- Prince of Darkness, a 2005 novel by Sharon Kay Penman, the fourth volume in the Justin de Quincy series

=== Subjects ===
- The Prince of Darkness, the subtitle of Monsieur, the first book of Lawrence Durrell's 1974 The Avignon Quintet

== Film and television ==
=== Films ===
- Dracula: Prince of Darkness, a 1966 horror film by Terence Fisher
- Prince of Darkness (film), a 1987 horror film by John Carpenter
- Martian Successor Nadesico: The Motion Picture – Prince of Darkness, a 1998 anime film directed by Tatsuo Satō

=== Television ===
- "Prince of Darkness", an episode of American television series Law & Order

== Music ==
=== Albums ===
- Prince of Darkness (Alice Cooper album) or the 1987 title song (see below), 1989
- Prince of Darkness (Big Daddy Kane album) or the title song, 1991
- Prince of Darkness (Nosferatu album), 1996
- Prince of Darkness (Ozzy Osbourne album), 2005
- Prince of Darkness (soundtrack), by John Carpenter from the 1987 film

=== Songs ===
- "Prince of Darkness", by Alice Cooper from Raise Your Fist and Yell, 1987
- "Prince of Darkness", by Bow Wow Wow from See Jungle! See Jungle! Go Join Your Gang Yeah, City All Over! Go Ape Crazy!, 1981
- "Prince of Darkness", by the Indigo Girls from Indigo Girls, 1989
- "Prince of Darkness", by Lucifer's Friend from ...Where the Groupies Killed the Blues, 1972
- "Prince of Darkness", by Megadeth from Risk, 1999
- "Prince of Darkness", by Miles Davis from Sorcerer, 1967

== See also ==
- Dark Lord (disambiguation)
- Demon King (disambiguation)
- Prince of Hell (disambiguation)
- Prince of Light (disambiguation)
- Phil, the Prince of Insufficient Light, a supernatural being in Scott Adams' comic strip Dilbert
- The Undertaker (born 1965), professional wrestler, called "Lord of Darkness"
- "The Princess of Darkness", a television episode
