= The Tarot Café =

Manhwa

- Cover, The Tarot Café volume 1 (Tokyopop edition)
- Genre: Horror, romance; Mythology
- Author: Park Sang-sun
- Publisher: (South Korea) Sigongsa
- English publisher: (Australia) (New Zealand) Madman Entertainment (Canada) (United States) Tokyopop
- Other publishers: (Argentina) Deux Studio (France) Soleil Manga (Hungary) Fumax (Italy) Flashbook (Spain) La Cupula (Russia) Comics Factory (Ukraine) Manga Media
- Volumes: 7

The Tarot Café is a manhwa by Park Sang-sun (박상선) being published by Sigongsa in South Korea, and distributed by Tokyopop in the United States. Seven volumes have been published in Korea, all of which have been translated into English. Each chapter starts or ends with a modified tarot card often relating to the story, featuring well known commercial tarot decks replaced with story characters.

== Plot ==
In contemporary Great Britain, Pamela is the owner of a mysterious Tarot Café. After midnight, she receives supernatural clients who come to her for advice through tarot readings. From cats to fairies to vampires, they tell her their stories even as she unravels their past, present and future through her cards. In exchange for her advice, they pay her with beads of Berial's Necklace, which Pamela gathers for her own secret ends.

== Characters ==
Pamela: Pamela was orphaned at age eleven when her mother was burned at the stake for witchcraft. As a result of her mother's begging, she was spared, despite having the ability to foresee the future. Led away from the village by a priest, Pamela was abandoned in the forest. After a chance encounter, she was raised by a dragon named Ash, who ultimately became both her lover and her mentor. Years later, Ash was murdered, and whilst dying in Pamela's arms, inadvertently gave Pamela his immortal life through a drop of blood from his heart, which manifested as a mark on her forehead. After trying unsuccessfully to end her life by many means, she makes a pact with Belus. In exchange for collecting the beads of Berial's necklace, he has agreed to kill her. Now, hundreds of years later, she is the wise proprietor of the Tarot Café. She is both kind and stern with her many customers, particularly her "special" ones. In her own words, she doesn't profess to know the future but instead depends on examining her clients to fully understand their motivations and problems. Also to aid her is a vast store of esoteric knowledge, particularly identification of magical creatures, and her companion Belus. Pamela is a kind-hearted young woman, shown when she takes in the young werewolf Aaron after he comes to her for a tarot reading, but at times cynical about humanity (though not quite to the extent of Belus). She has a complicated relationship with Belus, who she is bound to by a pact. While they outwardly appear to dislike each other and violently deny any sort of romantic relationship with one another, they tolerate and ultimately depend on one another for strength (or a good shove in one direction or another). However, he is simply an aspect of Belial, and being a devil he toys with her, revealing his true form and forcing her to choose between seeing her mother in heaven by killing Ash, and living forever. When she is saved, she remains close to Aaron and Neribos, saying goodbye to him when he dies. When Belus returns, he attempts in desperation to re-establish their old contract. However, she reveals she has decided to live, and tentatively lets him back into her life after he admits that he's lonely. It is implied they stay together and begin their relationship anew.

Belus: A mysterious young man with an intimate tie with Pamela, Belus is always at her shop to annoy her or offer cynical remarks about humanity and her clients. When they first "meet" he claims to be Prince of Pandemonium. After she is thrown in a body of water as a witch, he rescues her from a mob. He is often shown smoking a small opium pipe. Mercurial and flippant, he nevertheless shows a serious side, particularly when Pamela is threatened, slaughtering many to save her life. This may be because he has made a pact with her; in exchange for her gathering all the pieces of the mystic 'Belial's Necklace', he will end her immortal life. He also has a strange connection with Ash and Nebiros, and seems to know either everything or nothing at all about any given subject. He is often found to be involved in different episodes where one might not expect him to be. According to Ash, who hates Pamela because Belus his only friend as a child, he left to find her because she made him happier than anyone else. Despite his normal appearance, he exhibits several supernatural traits - his stamina, strength, speed and damage resistance are all far above humans, surviving falls and injuries that would kill humans and most immortals, and able to strangle a feral werewolf to near death without straining himself. Later in the series it is revealed he is capable of great magical feats. Eventually, he comes to be nearly killed defending Pamela, but appears in Hell where he and Pamela sleep together after he saves her life. In the end, it is revealed that Belus is just another form of Belial, who genuinely loves Pamela, but being a Devil and not knowing anything else, he has been playing a cruel game with her because she is the only thing that amuses him. He attempts to force her to choose between living for the rest of eternity, or killing Ash and dying. When she is saved by God, he goes into isolation for 60 years, only admitting his feelings when Neribos visits him to taunt him about love. At the end, he goes back to find Pamela after receiving a handkerchief soaked with her tears from Nebiros, and she lets him in. The two of them decide to spend the rest of eternity together with neither one dying, though it is unclear what their relationship becomes.

Aaron: Abused and ultimately sold by his alcoholic father, Aaron is a young boy who once was the companion of a demon named Nebiros, who granted his every wish. He ultimately grew dissatisfied in Nebiros's castle, and is lured by the enticing company of a young shepherd girl who persuaded him to run away with her. Once he left the castle, however, she turned into a werewolf and bit him with the intention of devouring him. Although Nebiros arrived in time to save him, Nebiros was stung by his young charge's betrayal and abandoned him. With a bite wound from the female werewolf, Aaron is now cursed to turn into a werewolf every full moon. After Pamela takes him from the streets and reads his cards, she hires him as her cafe employee. He is a flighty but good-hearted boy (described by Pamela as having 'the nose of a dog and the brain of a bird') who is haunted by the horrific change that comes over him every month and with the memory of the man who was like a true father to him. He is kidnapped and rescued by Nebiros and sixty years later at the end of the story, he is seen dying as an eighty-year-old man after Nebiros and he finally reconciled with each other, with Nebiros promising Aaron that they would see each other again once Nebiros returned to the rank of an angel.

Ash (past): Ash is the name of two virtually identical men with intimate connections to Pamela: one her former teacher and lover and the other a mysterious young man who suddenly appears on Pamela's doorstep. The past Ash was a dragon of great rank, though a kind, slightly scatterbrained recluse, in comparison to his closest friend, the serious and belligerent, though dutiful, Emperor Alecto. This is a deception however, though he does love Pamela, he admits to loving himself more, and is described by Belial himself as "the coldest person" he knows. He discovered Pamela after her mother was executed, and raised her, ultimately falling in love with her against the misgivings of Alecto. Pamela's and Ash's idyllic existence soon was shattered upon Ash's death and the passing of his immortality to her with the first drop of blood from his heart. Despite his love for Pamela and his genuine affection for Alecto, he truly detested life, describing his heart as stone and wanted nothing more to die, unleashing a tragic series of events that resulted in Pamela's anguished inheritance of his immortality.

Ash (present): The present day Ash appears to have no memories of his past and yet seems to attract the worst sort of company. Despite his sweet, almost innocent demeanor, he is in reality a cruel sociopath who has no trouble torturing and seducing others for mere amusement. He was apparently raised by the curious fortuneteller Cora since childhood though he shows her no real affection. He has a similarly tumultuous relationship with Belus, able to threaten the other man without repercussions, though due to Belus's true nature it is unsure how much of this is Belus humouring him for his own ends. According to him, Belus was his teacher and friend, but abandoned him for Pamela, causing him to hate her. Eventually he comes to be kidnapped by a confused Alecto and after a failed seduction attempt, faints at the speaking of the Past Ash's full name. Once he is returned, he comes to haunt both Pamela and Cora's steps once more, culminating in a devastating revelation about his past and purpose. Alecto tells the Ash that he is only a doll created by Belial and given life by a gemstone of Belial's necklace. Eventually, it is revealed that he is actually the real Ash, who had signed a contract with Belial for a new life in which one may die, be reborn, and have an end. After 60 years passed at the end of the series, Ash is seen as a young student among a group of friends walking past Pamela. Both of them share a long stare, before looking away. When questioned by one of his friends whether he knows her, Ash answers "no."

Alecto: Another dragon from the days of Dark England, apparently the Emperor of Dragons, with a grim prophecy hanging over him: the day he falls in love with a human female would be the day death takes him. Though friends with Ash, he treats him with open contempt and a gruff concern, particularly regarding Ash raising Pamela. His callousness extends to the point that he calls Ash a useless dragon, and were he a female Alecto would impregnate the other to propagate the species. Belatedly finding of Ash's death from a loyal wind servant, he was unable to find anything at the site of the death. He has since hunted Pamela, insistent she killed Ash, whether in malice or carelessness. So when he finally finds her, and proceeds to attack her, who should walk into the cafe but Ash himself. Confused, Alecto questions him fiercely, only to be told that this was not the real Ash. Refusing to accept the fact, he later kidnaps Ash and chains him in his bedchamber. After nearly being taken in by Ash's charms, he flees and later returns to explain to the new Ash about his past. When he speaks the past Dragon's name, he is then thrown back by a mysterious force later revealed to be Belial and obliterated. Later, it is revealed he was sent to Hell and spoke with a three-headed crone who told him his fate. It is later revealed that Alecto was also in love with Pamela since he first saw her and that he wishes to kill her to end his pain. He is infected by a Mind Worm, causing him to go insane, and is eventually killed in his dragon form by Belus.

Nebiros: Nebiros is a mysterious figure and the foster father of Aaron. He claims to be a demon though he is more commonly associated with werewolves, who fear and adore him. Some time before, he had "purchased" Aaron from his drunken father and lured him into a secluded castle. He provides the boy with everything he desires and soon takes him as a confidant. Cursed by "forces of light," (possibly for siding with Lucifer and the rebel angels in the War of Heaven) he becomes wracked with pain and must remain in isolation. Despite this curse, he is a powerful demon, able to turn underlings into stone with one touch of his sigil ring. Upon Aaron's betrayal, he abandons the boy and isolates himself. Oddly enough, he seems to be acquaintances with Belus, though he shows no liking for the other male. It is revealed at the end that Nebiros was a former angel who was cast from heaven and turned into a demon by the Almighty. He is Belial's rival, explaining his connection with Belus (Belus is another form of Belial). He later returns for Aaron and leads Pamela to Belial in Hell, getting his revenge on Belial as he can watch whilst he unwittingly betrays and crushes the thing he loves most, Pamela, forcing Belial to live without her. At the end, he somewhat helps Belial to reconcile with Pamela knowing the truth about his seclusion, saying Belus can't hide the truth of his real love for Pamela from him since they're brothers after all, and gives him a tissue soaked with Pamela's tears. He also reconciles with Aaron sixty years later in the storyline and waits to return to his angelic status so he can be with Aaron in Heaven.

Cora: A mysterious albino fortune teller. She found the present day Ash when he was just a child and raised him. When she goes to find Pamela later, Pamela is shocked at the resemblance between her mother and Cora. Upon meeting, Cora dissolves and leaves behind a gemstone from Belial's necklace, indicating that she was a doll like Ash.

Victor: A wicked monk from Pamela's past who was in love with Pamela. After she refused him (on the grounds that she was in love with another and that Victor must only love God as a monk), he attempts to rape her. He declares he would have her even if he had to make a deal with the devil. After she escapes, he makes a contract with Belial to have the strength to kill Ash, become immortal, and win Pamela. Though he succeeds in killing Ash, he does not obtain his other desires, as Belial only promised to give him the means, the fact he failed was his fault.

Berial/Belial: A devil-like figure. Known as the King of Fear and Deceit, Lord of Fire, Great Prince, and Noble of Malice (among other titles) and has great power in hell, rivaled only by Nebiros. It is implied throughout the series that despite being a Devil, he is simply bored rather than evil, though due to his power he has no respect for most people and treats them as pawns in his games to amuse himself. These games are usually cruel and malicious, no matter what he feels towards the individuals themselves.

Belial is first introduced with the concept of his necklace: The necklace holds immense power but was broken apart. These pieces gravitate towards mystical beings but have no power by themselves. Belus charged Pamela with collecting the bead in return for her death. It is later revealed that Belial disguised himself as a Sage who gave bread to the poor when Pamela was a child. When Pamela and her mother went to him for food, the girl's power let her see his true evil form, a winged demon feeding people the dead. This impressed and intrigued Belial, who then set about making Pamela immortal by granting Ash's wish to die (he wanted Pamela around forever so that he could continue to "enjoy" her). It is further revealed that he was responsible for creating Cora and the present day Ash with gemstones from his necklace and that they, along with Alecto, Pamela, and Belus, were pawns in his games. At the end of the series, it is revealed that Belial and Belus are one and the same and that he actually loves Pamela, but being a Devil and not knowing how to deal with this, plays a cruel game with her that only succeeds in driving her away. He was also disguised as the first monk who decreed that the mother must die but that Pamela was young enough to possibly be redeemed. After 60 years in isolation, Belial/Belus is gloated over by Nebiros, as since he and Belial are brothers, he knows Belial truly loved Pamela, claiming he enjoyed watching Belial rip himself apart, and leaves a handkerchief Pamela cried into. He begins to hope he can have this love reciprocated through Belus, an aspect of himself that Pamela loves, and attempts to re-establish his old contract with her just for a reason to contact her. When she reveals her desire to live, she tentatively lets him in, and it is implied they stay together, though it is unknown what happens to his realm in Hell after he leaves.

== Release ==
The Tarot Café is licensed for an English-language release in North America by Tokyopop, who published the seven volumes from March 8, 2005 to June 10, 2008. The series is also licensed in Brazil by NewPop Editora, and in France by Soleil Manga.

=== Volume List ===
No.	Original release date	Original ISBN	North American release date	North American ISBN
01	—	—	March 8, 2005	978-1-59532-555-6
001. "A Wish-Fulfilling Cat"; 002. "Eternal Beauty"; 003. "A Fairy"; 004. "A Heartless Princess, an Alchemist, and a Jester (Part 1)"
02	—	—	June 7, 2005	978-1-59532-556-3
005. "A Heartless Princess, an Alchemist and a Jester (Part 2)"; 006. "The Werewolf Boy"; 007. "The Witch Hunt"
03	—	—	September 13, 2005	978-1-59532-557-0
008. "The Star of Jealousy"; 009. "Lady of the Lake"; 010. "Dragon Heart"
04	—	—	December 13, 2005	978-1-59532-814-4
011. "A Butterfly in My Dreams"; 012. "Contract"; 013. "Leanan Sidhe (One)"
05	—	—	June 12, 2007	978-1-4278-0395-5
014. "Leanan Sidhe (Two)"; 015. "Perfume"; 016. "Tree and Long-Horned Beetle"
06	—	—	October 9, 2007	978-1-4278-0396-2
017. "Invitation to Hell"
07	—	—	June 10, 2008	978-1-4278-0397-9
018. "End of the Journey"
