= Dark Lady =

Dark Lady may refer to:

== Fictional entities ==
- Tragic mulatto, a stock fictional character often called a "dark lady"
- Sylvanas Windrunner, a World of Warcraft character
- The Dark Lady, a playable hero in the computer game Heroes of Newerth
- A female Dark Lord

== Literature ==
- Dark Lady (Shakespeare), the claimed addressee in a sonnet sequence by William Shakespeare
- Dark Lady (novel), a 1999 novel by Richard North Patterson
- Rosalind Franklin: The Dark Lady of DNA
- The Dark Lady: A Romance of the Far Future, a 1987 novel by Mike Resnick

== Music ==
- Dark Lady (album), an album by Cher
  - "Dark Lady" (song), the title track
- "Dark Lady", a song by The Scorpions from In Trance

== Other uses ==
- Jiutian Xuannü, the Dark Lady of the Nine Heavens (or simply Xuannü, the Dark Lady) in Chinese mythology

== See also ==
- Dark Lord (disambiguation)
