= Wink (manhwa) =

1993–2012 South Korean manhwa magazine

- Categories: Manhwa
- First issue: 1 August 1993
- Final issue: July 2012
- Company: Seoul Media Group
- Country: South Korea
- Language: Korean
- Website: winklove.jumps.co.kr

Wink (Korean: 윙크) is a popular South Korean manhwa magazine published by Seoul Media Group. The first issue was released on 1 August 1993. It publishes Bride of the Water God, Goong, and Hissing.

In July 2012, the magazine moved to digital format and the ongoing series in the magazine are available monthly through online subscription.

== Serializations ==
The following is a list of titles serialized in Wink and/or published under the Wink Comics book imprint. Some series are updated infrequently and as such do not appear in every issue of the magazine.

Title	Creator	Years
Absolute Witch (절대마녀, Jeoldae Manyeo)	Kim Tae-yoon (김태연)	2006-2010
Angel Shop (엔젤 샵-ANGEL SHOP)	Hwang Sook-ji (황숙지)	2003-2004
Antique Romance (소녀화첩, Son Yeohwa Cheob)	Kim Mi-jung (김미정)	2006-2008
Bride of the Water God (하백의 신부, Habaek-eui Shinbu)	Yun Mi-kyung (윤미경)	2006–2014
Book Club (독서클럽, Dogseokeulleob)	Cho Ju-hee (조주희)	2006-2008
Chronicles of Choon Eng (춘앵전, Choon Eng Jeon)	Jun Jin-suk (전진석)	2008-2012
Cool Hot (쿨핫)	Yoo Shi-jin	1997
DIY Girl (디아이와이 걸, Diaiwai Geol)	Lee Eun (이은)	2008-2010
DoDoRi (도도리)	Lee Eun (이은)	2011–present
Dokebi Bride (도깨비 신부, Chun-aengjeondokkaebi Shinbu)	Marley (말리)	2002-2009
Don't Cry Boreum (어화둥둥 내보르미, Eohwadungdungnae Boreumi)	Lee Yun-hee (이윤희)	2010–present
DVD	Chon Kye-young (천계영)	2003-2006
Fever	Park Hee-jung (박희정)	2003-2007
Girl in Heels (하이힐을 신은 소녀, Haihil-eul Sin-eun Sonyeo)	Chon Kye-young (천계영)	2007-2010
God is Love (하나님, 연애하다, Hananim, Yeonaehada)	Park Hui-hyeol (박희열)	2011–present
The Royal Palace: Goong (궁, Goong)	Park So-hee (박소희)	2002-2012
H2O	Hwang Sook-ji (황숙지)	2005-2007
Hello, I'm Simba (안녕하세요? 세바스찬입니다, Annyeonghaseyo? Sebaseuchan-ibnida)	Shim Hye-jin (심혜진)	1997
Hissing (히싱, Hi-sing)	Kang Eun-young (강은영)	2004-2006
Kitchen (키친, Kichin)	Cho Ju-hee (조주희)	2009-2011
Let Dai (렛 다이)	Won Soo-yeon (원수연)	1995-2005
Lingerie (란제리)	Seo Yoon-young (서윤영)	2008-2010
Mana (마나)	Lee Vin (이빈)	2006-2008
Mani (마니)	Yoo Shi-jin	1995
Martin & John (마틴&존, Matin & Jon)	Park Hee-jung (박희정)	2006-2011
My Mother and the Game-Room Guest (게임방 손님과 어머니, Geimbang Sonnimgwa Eomeoni)	Kisun (기선)	2005-2007
Nexio (넥시오)	Jun Euho (전유호)	2012-present
A Night of a Thousand Dreams (천일야화, Cheon-il-yahwa)	Han Seung-hee (한승희)	2004-2008
Oh, My Romantic Kumiho (Oh, My 로맨틱 구미호, Oh, My Lomaentig Gumiho)	Kim Yeong-mi (김영미)	2010-present
Outside (아웃사이드)	Yoo Shi-jin	1994
Railroad (레일로드)	Yun Mi-kyung (윤미경)	2004-2006
Red Moon (레드문)	Hwang Mi-na (황미나)	1993
Romantic Dream (헬프 미 베이베, Helpeu Mi Beibe)	Lee Hannah (이한아)	2008
Royal Love (로열 러브)	Lee Han-Ah (이한아)	2009
Running Through the City in the Sunset (잿빛 도시숲을 달리다, Jaesbich Dosisup-eul Dallida)	Uhm Jung-hyun (엄정현)	2005-2006
Safe Again Today (오늘도 무사히!, Oneuldo Musahi!)	Yuu Jin-soo (유진수) - author Park Suhlah (박설아) - artist	2006-2007
Shipwrecked (탐나는 도다, Tamnaneun Doda)	Jung Hye-na (정혜나)	2007-present
Sugar Addiction (설탕 중독, Seoltang Jungdog)	Maria (マリア) and Yang-ah (공구구)	2005-2007
The Summit (절정, Jeoljeong)	Lee Young-lee (이영희)	2005-hiatus
Shiwhamong (시화몽)	Lee Jong-eun (이종은)	2002-hiatus
Youthful Animator Sihwa (생기발랄 시화관, Saeng-giballal Sihwagwan)	Park Tae-yoon (김태연)	2011-present

== See also ==
- Issue (magazine)
