= Prince of Hell =

In Demonology, a Prince of Hell is a frequently assigned title for a variety of particularly powerful demons. Prince or Princes of Hell can refer to:

- Lucifer as the singular Prince of Hell in particular (see also the Prince of Darkness (Milton)).
  - Beelzebub.
- Various ranks in many different classifications of demons.
  - Seven embodiments of the Seven Deadly Sins, such as those within the Lanterne of Light or Binsfeld hierarchies.
  - Princes, the tertiary rank of demons below Dukes and above Marquises in the Ars Goetia
- A monstrous figure nicknamed the Prince of Hell by scholars in the right panel of Hieronymus Bosch's The Garden of Earthly Delights

== See also ==
- Prince of Darkness (disambiguation)
