= Angel Diary =

2005–2010 manhwa by Lee Yoon-hee

- Cover of the Yen Press edition of Angel Diary vol. 6 (2007), art by Kara

천행기 RR: Cheonhaenggi MR: Ch'ŏnhaenggi
- Genre: Fantasy
- Author: Lee Yoon-hee
- Illustrator: Kara
- Publisher: (South Korea) Sigongsa
- English publisher: (United States) Yen Press
- Original run: 2005–2010
- Volumes: 13

Angel Diary (Korean: 천행기; Hanja: 天行記; lit. 'Destination Heaven Chronicles') is a manhwa written by Lee Yoon-hee and drawn by Kara. It is based around the errant Princess of Heaven who is hiding on Earth as a boy, and the four guardians of heaven who watch over her.

== Synopsis ==
The Princess of Heaven, Chun-yoo, runs away from her betrothed fiancé, the King of Hell, and finds refuge on Earth disguised as a high school boy, Dong-young. "He" has a perverted best friend Bi-wal who likes to grope "him" in front of everyone. The Four Guardians of Heaven are sent to find her in the mortal world. But on Earth, there is also hidden dangers and evil beings trying to capture the now vulnerable princess.

Kara has noted that Angel Diary takes place in the same universe as a previous work, Demon Diary, though any characters from the first series have yet to be seen, except as similarities in appearance. In volume 5, however, Ah-hin can be seen reading a Demon Diary volume.

== Characters ==
Whang Chun-yoo/Dong-young

The Princess of Heaven and protagonist of Angel Diary. She does not wish to be married to the King of Hell, to whom she is betrothed, assuming he is some kind of perverted old man. Determined to escape her fate, Chun-yoo retreats to earth and disguises herself as a boy. Her school boy alter-ego is named Dong-Young. She also begins to have feelings for her mysterious friend Bi-Wal, who acts as though they are a couple. Doung-Young is watched over by two of the Four Guardians of Heaven, Ah-Hin (The White Tiger and her closest friend) and Ah-Hin's brother; Ee-Jung (Red Phoenix). Later in the manga it is revealed that the royal children of heaven are genderless until a certain age, that then can the child can choose its gender.

Dong-young was raised as a boy during this period and was born with the power to be the General Winter. He trained with the Ice Snow Sword up until a certain age, when it was declared he would become a she for the Peace treaty between Heaven and Hell to work. Dong-young's main goal was to have a lazy life just like her brothers, who had all grown up and moved away, sitting lazily around in palaces and slowly inheriting money. It is said by Doh-hyun that Dong-young could have been a great and powerful King, if not for the need of a Princess and her being the youngest. Later, in order to allow demons into the heaven/hell system, she became the Lord of Heaven, marrying Bi-wal and living in the demon world with him.

She shows traits of being strong-willed and very determined, as she was ready to fight Doh-hyun as he attempted to take her back to Heaven. Although she tolerates her friends, she can be provoked to anger, such as how touchy-feely Bi-wal is with her. Characters such as Mya-Oh and Ah-hin describe her "dim-witted". Referred to as "simple, straightforward and hopelessly honest" by Bi-wal. Though she has her quirks, she is incredibly compassionate and wishes to protect to those she cares about.

Jin Bi-wal

Bi-wal is the friend of Dong-young and attends the same high school. They are very close and are often confused by other students to be homosexual or "boy-lovers". He is the only character who suspects Dong-young to be the Princess. He sometimes likes to grope Dong-young even after "finding out" that she was a girl (he had already known that she was a girl before he accidentally saw her bound chest). Bi-wal is also shown to be something more than a human (as he seems to have a great deal of power by killing a nymph to save Dong-young and is also a fiancé of a noble from Hell) and has a hidden agenda regarding Dong-young. Later in the series, Bi-wal is said to be the real King of Hell. Bi-wal and Doung-young knew each other since their childhood, but Dong-young doesn't remember it and the promise they made. He also shows love for Dong-young.

Initially, laid back and humorous, he enjoys teasing others, especially Dong-young. When his brother becomes involved with a scenario, however, he became more serious and loses his "funny, charming classmate" facade. During the rescue of Dong-Young's kidnapping, he tells his brother that he stayed with her because he knew that Ryung-Jin would some time approach the Princess, and it would make it easier for him to find Ryung. He goes on to say that he thinks Dong-Young to be nothing more than a tool to manipulate. However, he says this to try to get closer to his brother and actually loves the princess. Once Ryung agrees to make peace, Bi-Wal returns to his post as King of Hell. He marries Doung-young when she becomes Lord of Heaven and together, they live in a palace in the demon world.

Some fans note that Bi-wal resembles a younger version of Eclipse, the dour tutor from Demon Diary, an earlier Kara work.

Ah-hin

One of the Four Guardians of Heaven, the "White Tiger", and was mistaken as Ee-jung by Woo-hyun, who had bullied her when they were little because of his crush on her. She is the childhood friend of Dong-young and is also a student at Dong-young's school in order to protect her and to prevent her identity from being discovered by the other two Guardians of Heaven who were sent to capture the angel princess. Ee-jung's older sister, she cares for her brother dearly and tries to make him enjoy himself more. Despite having been bullied by Woo-hyun and saying she'd never talk to him again, Ah-hin seems to have some feelings for him, and later become a couple.

She was mistaken as a boy during her childhood in Heaven, but desired to become more feminine and "pretty". With the help of Dong-young, Ah-hin became "beautiful". As she became more attractive, Ah-hin discovered at a young age how to tell disingenuous personalities from true characters. Shown to be bold, yet at the same time hesitant to the situation at hand. She is quite perceptive, shown when she confronted Woo-hyun on his true identity, as well as Doh-hyun's feelings for Dong-young.

Ee-jung

Another of the Four Guardians of Heaven, the "Red Phoenix". Because he is the Red Phoenix, it is traditional that he wore female clothing as a child and as a result, he was mistaken as Ah-hin by Woo-hyun. He is very protective of Ah-hin because she was bullied and is very cold toward Woo-hyun because he blames him for changing Ah-hin's personality. Ee-jung is close to his elder sister and will do almost whatever she asks of him. He is also a student at Dong-young's school.

Shown to have a calm and collected personality, but tends to "whine and complain". Noted to have a "sister complex" by Dong-young, Ee-jung dislikes if others treat her any less than what he sees fit, especially towards Woo-hyun. He also appears to be distant or even indifferent of most situations.

Ee-jung has a startling similarity in appearance to the Demon Lord Raenef V from Demon Diary, though both are near polar opposites in personality.

Woo-hyun

One of the Four Guardians of Heaven, the "Blue Dragon". He is also one of the two Guardians ordered to capture the angel princess. When they were all little, Woo-hyun teased Ah-hin while thinking that she was Ee-jung because he had a crush on her. Even after a few years, Woo-hyun still likes Ah-hin and tries to make it up to her even with her bitter rejections and Ee-jung's cold warnings. He is also one of the students at Dong-young's school and hunts down evil spirits with Doh-hyun, his cousin.

Probably one of the most energetic of the group next to Dong-young, but at times can be seen as serious, such as when he threatened to fight the Princess in order to return her to Heaven. He is incredibly cheery and easy-going compared to Ee-jung or Doh-hyun. At times can be perceived as naive or even lazy, but Woo-hyun cares deeply for his friends, especially towards his cousin Doh-hyun.

Doh-hyun

One of the Four Guardians of Heaven and perhaps the strongest of them all, the "Black Turtle". He is the second of the two Guardians ordered to capture the angel princess. Despite his observing nature, Doh-hyun finds out that Dong-young is a girl but still does not make the connection that she is, in fact, the Princess of Heaven that he was ordered to capture. He later develops a crush on Dong-young, though does his best to place his feelings aside.

In later volumes of the manga, it was found out that since they were still little kids, Doh-hyun has liked the princess and wanted to protect her. After Doh-hyun found out Dong-young was the princess, Doh-Hyun became more protective of her and he threatens that if he finds her in a bad situation he will be taking her back to Heaven for her own protection. Later he begins to "develop feelings" for Mi-Hyang So-Wal and they become a couple.

Cho-Ryun

This tree spirit appears in volume two, at first he appears to Doh-hyun and Woo-hyun, looking for his friend. He is from the Princess's Garden in Heaven and has come to Earth to look for his friend (who is Ah-Hin) He looks like a girl, and so at first Doh-Hyun and Woo-Hyun think he is a 'she', but they found out that 'she' is a 'he' by when Woo-hyun told him "You can stay with us for a while, Miss Cho-Ryun" and he responds "I'm not a 'miss', but a 'mister' (a male tree with flowers) and he is also involved in an idea to find out who the real princess is by recognizing her with Woo-Hyun and Doh-Hyun.

Mi-Hyang So-Wal

Bi-Wal's fiance from Hell. She comes from a noble family in Hell, known for their spell casting abilities and medical abilities, and has a crush on Bi-Wal. Her mother was a close friend of the late queen, Bi-Wal's mother. Mi-Hyang runs away from home comes to earth to find the princess. She doesn't like the idea of the Princess of Heaven marrying the King of Hell because she was in love with Bi-Wal "first" and wanted to end the engagement.

She is shown to be somewhat self-centered and snobbish, but she comes from a good heart. She is able to perform spells relatively well, considering how she healed Doh-hyun after his defeat with Ryung-nim. She also has a knack for running into people, as she has with Doh-hyun on multiple occasions. She is later seen in a relationship with Doh-Hyun as they bond over both being rejected by their "first loves". Although both are show to be happy together in the final chapters, they morn the wedding of Bi-Wal and Doung-Young, saying they feel sad over their former crushes.

Water Nymph

A water nymph appearing in volumes one and two that lives in the pond near Dong-Young's school vacation spot. A legend surrounds the pond, saying that a beautiful nymph lived there. One rainy day, a young man came to the pond and kept crying out a girls name. The nymph fell in love with the man and came to him, telling him "You are handsome and kindhearted. You deserve to be loved.". Happy, he stayed with her for some days, bringing her a hair clip and talking to her, thinking them friends. However, one day he came by and said he was going to marry the girl he loved, while running away. The nymph panicked and called his name, reaching out to him and saying she could not leave her pond. Not knowing that humans cannot live underwater, she took him in her arms and accidentally drowned her lover in an attempt to live with him forever in her submerged palace. Thinking he was only ill, she called on the advice of a mysterious Bi-Wal lookalike (revealed later to be Bi-Wal's brother) who told her to call an angel from Heaven to her pond and use its sacrificed blood to "cure" her lover.

The water nymph seizes the opportunity to lure Dong-Young into her home for the sacrifice. However, upon finding his love interest kidnapped, Bi-Wal enters the underwater lair to rescue Dong-Young. Before killing the nymph, he reveals to her that she in fact, killed her lover and that no sacrifice would bring him back. Bi-Wal summons a sword during the battle, which Dong-young sees. Bi-wal then deletes her memory of the events and takes her back to the resort. (it seems as though the water nymph has a tail in water, but can give herself legs when needed, as when she first lures Dong-young, she walks to her room in the resort, but when she has her walk into the pond and Doh-Hyun interrupts her, they show a tail retreating into the water.)

Queen Hong

She is the Queen of Heaven and in volume 7 she is revealed to be the Red Princess, or the Princess of Hell. Her true name being Wal-Hyang Jin. We also discover Bi-wal is Queen Hong's younger brother. She was behind Doung Young's escapade to earth and ordering White tiger and Red Phoenix to guard her. She is the eldest child of the royal family of Hell, and Ryung-Jin and Bi-Wal are her twin brothers, younger by 100 years.

Jin Ryung

He is Bi-wal's older twin brother by 3 hours, he did not become the king of hell because he was not supposedly blessed by the moon, which is why his hair is white, but because he is not blessed by the moon that makes him more powerful and many fear him because of that. He feels responsible because of Queen Hong's marriage to the king of heaven and wants to take Dong-Young away from Bi-wal to spare him from the marriage.

Se-In

Se-In is a high-level demon that looks very human. He can hide his black wings. He loves Ryung and will do anything for him. When he was young Ryung Num found him beaten and helped him. He discovered Se-In was next in line to rule the demons. It is discovered that one demon is born with immense power each generation and eventually kills the current leader. The current leader tried to get rid of Se-In before he matured so he wouldn't be a threat. Se-In is severely injured when Dong-Young pierces him with her ice snow sword. He tried to kill Dong-Young for Ryung, but was killed by Doh-hyun and was turned into dust. Dong-Young seeing Ryung's true feelings realizes that he needs Se-In and regenerates him in a seed because he was given her blood she is able to. He is unable to reborn from the seed because demons are not registered in the Heaven/Hell system, however once Doung-Young becomes Lord of Heaven, she enters demons into the system, allowing Se-In to be reborn as a baby, without any of his former memories. Ryung raised him as his son after that.

Hee Young

Bi-Wal's closest friend and most trusted aid. Hee-Young is the only son of the Red Moon family, a powerful family in hell that held very little respect for the royal family. Hee-young was set to inherit the family, along with his sister, Hee-Me. Hee-Me, however, gambled with Wal-Hyang Jin, the regent at the time. Hee-Me lost the bet, and Hee-Young became Wal-Hyang's property. She then gave him to Bi-Wal as a present. Wal-Hyang placed both boys in danger for entertainment, leading Hee-Me to want to gamble again for her brother back, for she wanted to torture him too. She lost again and Hee-Young became Bi-Wal's servant for eternity, with no pay. Hee-Young is still very angry about this and refuses to see his family. He is fiercely loyal to Bi-Wal, following him into the human realm and enrolling into school with him to help look for Ryung. Hee-Young also helps Bi-Wal with paperwork and tasks while he is away from Hell.

Chun Jae

He is The King of Heaven and Doung-Young's Father, he met the princess of hell while he was patrolling the borders of hell and heaven, in order to marry her he betrothed Dong-Young to the King of Hell. He became King of Heaven due to the fact he pulled the shortest stick.

Dong-young Unnamed brother

He was originally going to be the next King of Heaven since he lost at rock paper scissors. He tried killing himself many times and he, and Dong-young's other brothers, automatically agreed to support her for being the next King.

== Comic ==
Ice Kunion had published volumes 1-5 and very small number of volume 6. Yen Press has published volumes 7, 8, and 9 and will publish 10 November 2009. Volumes 11 and 12 were also released by Yen Press in 2010.
