= The Antique Gift Shop =

- Cover of The Antique Gift Shop vol. 1 (2005), art by Eun Lee

분녀네 선물가게 Bunnyeone seonmulgage
- Genre: Horror, mystery, romance
- Author: Eun Lee
- Publisher: (South Korea) Seoul Cultural Publishers
- English publisher: (United States) Yen Press, Ice Kunion
- Original run: 2004–2008
- Volumes: 10

The Antique Gift Shop (Korean: 분녀네 선물가게) is a manhwa created by Lee Eun. In the United States, Yen Press (originally Ice Kunion) publishes the series.

The series is about Bun-nyuh Cho, a girl who once attended the famous S University with stellar grades who was tricked by her grandmother to run an antique shop instead. But the cursed antiques have their own way of selecting and affecting the lives of their new owners, or mysteriously finding a way back to their old masters.

Bun-nyuh is a modern girl who can't stand her new job as shop proprietor, speaks her mind, hates everything superstitious and doesn't believe in things that can't be explained by science. Originally slated to go to medical school, she makes a bet with her grandmother that if she is able to sell all the antiques in the shop, she will be free to live the life she chooses. If she does not, she must give up her modern lifestyle and follow in her grandmother's footsteps as a shaman in the family business.

In the United States the first volume was originally released in November 2005 by Ice Kunion, while the second appeared in February 2006 and the third appeared in May 2006. All ten volumes have now been published by Yen Press, starting in December 2005 with volume one and concluding in March 2010 with volume ten.

== Volume One ==
Chapter 1: The Summer Guest
An introductory story about a twice returned antique "jookbu-in." The long-haired, tall and handsome Mr. Yang, the store's sole employee, makes his first appearance. He has a mysterious knowledge of all the antiques in the store and an uncanny talent for reading minds.
Chapter 2: The Fox Lantern
One day a girl who is incapable of loving others walks into the shop and asks for some candles but ends up buying a magic fox lantern, once used in the emperor's palace to quell anxieties. The spirit in the lantern brings her dreams of a young man who has lost his love.
Chapter 3: The Secret Garden, part 1
The tale of a love triangle between three high school students, Eun-jae, Yang-ji and Dan-soo that almost ends badly but for the help of Mr. Yang and an antique diary that can only be read when moistened with tears.

== Volume Two ==
Chapter 3: The Secret Garden, part 2
The story of Dan-soo, cursed now by "mongdalgui" until the day he dies, and Jae-min, a recently deceased mongdalgui. It's an unlucky day for Bun-nyuh when she, out of spite, takes off the talisman her grandmother gave her for protection.

== Volume Three ==
Chapter 4: The Secret Garden, conclusion
Mr. Yang comes to Bun-nyuh's rescue with the help of an antique back scratcher and places the talisman around her neck once more. Bun-nyuh learns that even if she doesn't believe in her grandmother's ways, her past is still a part of who she is.
Chapter 5: Gahwi
Bun-nyuh's past is surrounded by bad luck—it's no wonder she's suppressed most of the bad memories. Raised by her grandmother in a small, quiet village in rural Korea, young Bun-nyuh's first encounter with the cursed antiques results in tragedy. Mr. Yang's connection to Bun-nyuh's past, and the origins of the antique gift shop are revealed.

== Volume Four ==
Chapter 6: The Four Posts of Fate
Mr. Yang finds an unlikely "girlfriend" in a mob daughter. Strong willed Yun-ook attempts to use Mr. Yang to make the one she loves jealous. Unfortunately, the one she loves is the one person she cannot have. Bun-nyuh tries to sell Mr. Yang as a fortuneteller to the mobsters in order to have her debt with them forgiven. In turn, Mr. Yang tells the mobsters about a peculiar ritual called "bosam" which may help Yun-ook rewrite her own destiny.
Chapter 7: Strange Family in Snow Heights, part 1
A young assassin, Young-woo, takes refuge from the authorities in a creepy mansion called Snow Heights where its inhabitants are even creepier but strangely welcoming. The family there is keeping a secret that is tied to his past.

== Volume Five ==
Chapter 7: Strange Family in Snow Heights, conclusion
Chapter 8: Go? Or Stop?
When Mr. Yang takes a vacation for the first time, Bun-nyuh is left alone in the shop with her cursed antiques on a rainy day. She has always had a phobia of rain, since two of the saddest events of her life occurred on rainy days, and hides herself in a closet, ignoring her customers. Help comes to her in the most unexpected ways.

== Volume Six ==
Chapter 9: Bun-hong
The story of Bun-nyuh's mother is finally revealed, as is the mysterious way she died. Bun-nyuh has always blamed her grandmother for her mother's death but unknown to her, her grandmother made a sacrifice so that Bun-nyuh could live.
Chapter 10: Suspicious Relationship
Bun-nyuh goes to an OB-GYN for the first time to ask a peculiar question. Seeing through a pair of antique glasses she uses to disguise herself, Bun-nyuh finds herself suddenly attracted to the doctor! The feeling seems mutual until he reveals the story of his missing (and quite insane) wife. Unfortunately, the tale is all too familiar to Bun-nyuh.
Chapter 11: Don't Worry
When Mr. Yang gives an antique Guatemalan Indian "Worry Doll" to a little girl crying outside of the shop, he decides to give them out to every one in the city who carries worries in their heart. Unfortunately, the result turns out to be more trouble than it was worth.

== Volume Seven ==
Chapter 12: The Pot of Sungjoo
ChanYoung always thought he was the troublemaker in the family. But when his older brother is killed in a hit-and-run accident, ChanYoung discovers a few secrets in his late brother's house...namely a mysterious girl living there.
Chapter 13: Kumari Soon, part 1
Bun-Nyuh lets a beautiful woman with a knack for selling antiques take charge of the shop. But this goddess's sales come with strings attached.

== Volume Eight ==
Chapter 13: Kumari Soon, conclusion

Chapter 14: A Mermaid Princess Lives in the Han River, part 1

== Volume Nine ==
Chapter 14: A Mermaid Princess Lives in the Han River, conclusion

Chapter 15: The River of Oblivion, part 1

== Volume Ten ==
Chapter 15: The River of Oblivion, conclusion

Chapter 16: Door

== List of characters ==
Bun-nyuh Cho: The young proprietor of The Antique Gift Shop who would rather be in school. She was raised by her grandmother in the rural countryside of Korea but abandoned in Seoul at a young age on a rainy night. Her mother was also buried on a rainy day, therefore causing Bun-nyuh to have a phobia of rain. Bun-nyuh was raised in a Christian orphanage and watched over by a distant relative during her adolescence. Because of her tomboyish and rough attitude, she was much admired by the girls in school when she was younger.

Though she is able to see spirits and ghosts, she stubbornly refuses to admit belief in anything that can't be explained by science. Bun-nyuh also excels in fortune-telling, just like her mother and grandmother. She has a selective memory of the tragic events in her past and is constantly in denial of her true feelings. She hates feeling weak or helpless. Bun-nyuh is also very modern, cursing and swearing and giving the one-fingered salute wherever she goes. She loves designer labels and would rather go shopping than pay her employees. She maintained excellent grades while in school before taking a leave of absence from the prestigious S University. Despite her loathing for it, she is also an excellent salesperson.

Yang/Mr. Yang: The only employee of the Antique Gift Shop, Mr. Yang is almost 7 feet tall and has long, silky hair flowing nearly to the floor. He has a very god-like quality about him. When he is not dressed in his shop uniform and apron, he dons archaic embroidered robes and very old-fashioned clothing. His delicate features are very beautiful and almost feminine.

Though not revealed in volumes 1 - 6, the reader has the sense that he has known Bun-nyuh's family for quite some time. He refers to her ancestral village as his "hometown." He also possesses the ability to "speak" to the antiques and to read minds. Though he dislikes humans for their inability to believe things they don't understand our cannot see, he is known by the antiques as "the one who serves humans." There is the sense that he has served one human in particular, Bun-nyuh, for centuries.

Mr. Yang actually knows more about Bun-nyuh and her family than he lets on, and more than even Bun-nyuh is aware of herself. Though their relationship is often characterized as "master-servant" in other instances the relationship between Bun-nyuh and Mr. Yang could be characterized as "student-teacher." In brief moments in the manhwa, their relationship can be characterized as "intimate," as when they go to the movies together, when he puts her to bed as she recovers from a hangover, when he saves her from being raped by the mongdalgui possessed Dan-soo, and when he tells the hwatu characters to cheer her up while he's gone because he knows it will rain.

Grandmother: Bun-nyuh's only living blood relative in the world, her grandmother is a shaman of the Divine Spirit and can see ghosts/spirits, conduct purifications, exorcisms and predict/read fortunes. She is mysteriously under a curse and is constantly hounded by a 'spirit guide' who takes the form of a woman in white with long hair. Her spirit guide claims that Bun-nyuh's grandmother 'owes her' but is willing take over Bun-nyuh to satisfy this debt. The nature of grandmother's curse stems from both her and her spirit guide having the same fiancé in the past who collected the cursed antiques to begin with, Mr. Sailor Park. Bun-nyuh's grandmother abandoned her in Seoul to let her granddaughter live a 'normal' life for as long as possible before the family curse caught up with Bun-nyuh.

Ie-rang Ha/Nae-soong Ha: Bun-nyuh's best friend in high school who subsequently became a popular Korean actress. Ie-rang was a beautiful but shy girl who was bullied. Like Bun-nyuh, Ie-rang was primarily an orphan. Bun-nyuh holds a grudge against Ie-rang for stealing her first love. Ie-rang only stole Bun-nyuh's first love because she was in love with Bun-nyuh. She later confesses that Bun-nyuh was her first love in her autobiographical movie, "Raise the Flag." Bun-nyuh slept through most of the movie. Ie-rang was supposed to go the US for her career, but she postponed that and additional plastic surgery to pop in on Bun-nyuh from time to time after she discovered Bun-nyuh's Antique Gift Shop.

In-gyu: A young man from a wealthy family who has amnesia after a car accident. He loses his lover in the accident and his family will not let him remember her because they disapproved of their union. He is beckoned to wander and find the red lantern he sees in his dreams.

Yoon-ju: In-gyu's deceased lover. She was known to have a psychological disorder.

Soo-young: The anti-social young writer who takes up renting In-gyu and Yoon-ju's old apartment. She purchases the Fox Lantern from the shop because its spirit called to her. The lantern brings her dreams of In-gyu and she finds herself falling in love with him and wishing she were Yoon-ju. She is unaware of their plight until she finally meets In-gyu in person.

Eun-jae Jung: A young girl who purchases the Hollow Diary from the shop. She intents to share it with her best friend Yang-ji, whom she is secretly in love with. Yang-ji, however, is in love with Dan-soo, a popular boy from school. Eun-jae soon discovers that Dan-soo is a playboy who is dating and mistreating her sister. Yang-ji misunderstands and believes Eun-jae is in love with Dan-soo, thus causing a rift in their relationship.

Dan-soo: One of the most good looking and popular boys in school, his classmates are unaware that he made a pact with cursed ghosts called mongdalgui in order to get that way. Over time, he begins to lose control to the mongdalgui and lust after more women and even tries to force himself on Yang-ji and Bun-nyuh. Yang stops him and tells him he must become a monk or he will die young.

Yang-ji: Eun-jae's clueless best friend from school who doesn't realize the value of their friendship until she almost loses it.

Ji-yong: Bun-nyuh's childhood friend who carried an umbrella everywhere he went and died under mysterious circumstances. His spirit still lingers at Bun-nyuh's ancestral home.

Yun-ook: A headstrong mob daughter who is in love with her childhood friend Tae-joo, but can't have him because of a prophecy that she will kill her first husband.

Tae-joo: The unlucky object of Yun-ook's desires since childhood. He runs the mob group organized by her father after the untimely death of the mob boss. He is unable to marry because he is in love with Yun-ook.

Green Ruperts: Grim reapers who take the dead to Hell. They have pale faces and dress all in black as they carry a list in the form of a scroll with the names of the dead when they work. Their mottos are 'no gambling' and 'precision.' Despite this they have a love for gambling and playing hwatu cards, and on some occasions are not precise in who they claim for dead. The leader of the Green Ruperts has an intimate history with Bun-nyuh's family as he was the one who took her mother on the day she died when he was originally supposed to take Bun-nyuh.

Bun-hong: Bun-nyuh's insane mother. Faulted for being 'weak minded' as a shaman, she was possessed and then went insane, was cursed to act like a child for the remainder of her days. She ran away from home and worked in a beauty salon for a time, conceived Bun-nyuh with the son of a wealthy family, and then came back. Every February 12, on the anniversary of her death, Bun-nyuh's grandmother and Mr. Yang will greet Bun-hong's spirit, now in her right mind in death. Bun-hong waits every year for her daughter to come pay her respects, but every year waits in vain.
