= Heavenly Executioner Chiwoo =

- Cover for volume1 for the series in korean

치우천하 Chiu cheonha
- Genre: Action/adventure
- Author: Park KangHo
- Publisher: Seoul Cultural Publishers, inc
- English publisher: (United States) iceKunion (United States) Yen Press
- Volumes: 5

Heavenly Executioner Chiwoo (Korean: 치우천하) is a manhwa created by Park KangHo and Lee HaNa. The series was first introduced to american audiences in the 2005 San Diego Comic-Con as part of the manhwa booth being run by the Korea Culture & Contents Agency.

In the United States iceKunion originally licensed the series; Yen Press later took the license. In the U.S. Volume 1 was released in November 2005, Volume 2 in February 2006, Volume 3 in May 2006, Volume 4 in May 2008, and Volume 5 in September 2008. Volume 5 is the final volume, but it does not conclude the story line.

The series stars Chiwoo, who discovers that his father was a mangnani, an executioner in ancient Korea. An emperor's army attempts to wipe out all mangnanies. After Chiwoo sees Uncle Wolbak attacked by soldiers, Chiwoo becomes a mangnani.
