= Prince of Light =

Prince of Light may refer to:

- Prince of Light, a title of the archangel Michael
- Ramayana: The Legend of Prince Rama, a 1992 Indo-Japanese animated film

== See also ==
- Prince of Darkness (disambiguation)
