= Evil corporation =

Corporation that ignores social responsibility

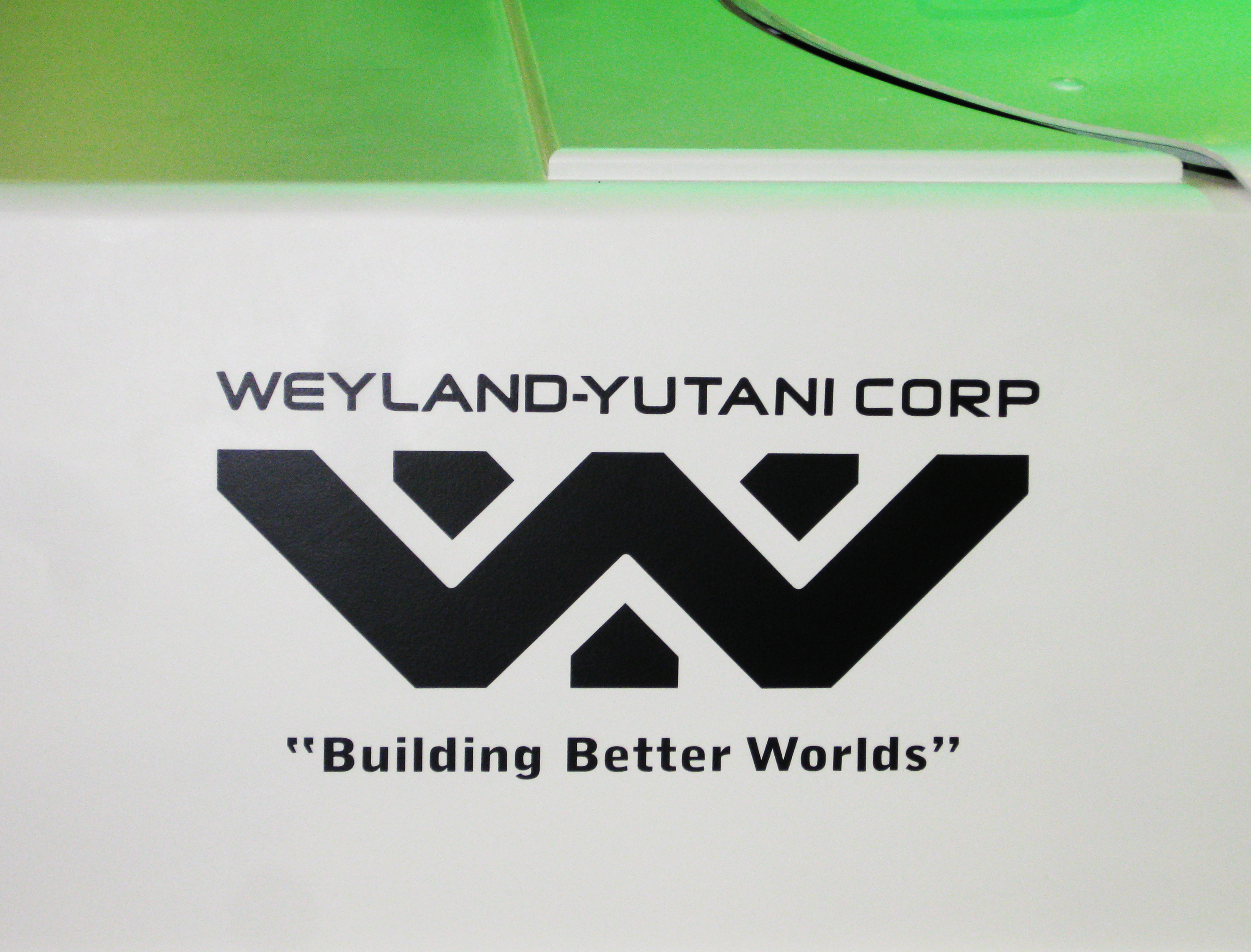
Logo and slogan of the fictional evil Weyland-Yutani corporation from the Alien franchise

An evil corporation is a term which frequently appears in science fiction and or dystopian works to refer to corporations that ignore ethics, morality, laws and social responsibility in order to make a profit for their shareholders.

== In fiction ==
The notion is "deeply embedded in the landscape of contemporary culture—populating films, novels, video games, and more." The science fiction genre served as the initial background to portray corporations in this dystopian light.

Evil corporations can be seen to represent the danger of combining capitalism with larger hubris.

Examples of the trope include Arasaka Corporation in Cyberpunk 2077, the Tyrell and Wallace corporations in Blade Runner, Weyland-Yutani in Alien, Vault-Tec in Fallout, InGen in Jurassic Park, Resources Development Administration (RDA) in Avatar, Umbrella Corporation in Resident Evil, Lumon Industries in Severance, Omni Consumer Products (OCP) in RoboCop, Cyberdyne Systems in Terminator, Aperture Science in Portal, Shinra Electric Power Company in Final Fantasy VII, E Corp in Mr. Robot, and Vought International in The Boys.

== Real-world usage ==
Some real-world corporations have been accused of being evil. To guard against such accusations, Google used the official motto "Don't be evil" until the formation of Alphabet Inc. Rob Enderle argued that this motto was never truly followed, and critics of Google have accused the company of "evil" acts such as secret data collection, violating customers' privacy, and political bias. The motto was eventually moved to the very end of its code of conduct. The New Yorker wrote that "many food activists consider Monsanto (which later merged with Bayer) to be the definitively evil corporation".

The Debate over Corporate Social Responsibility wrote, "For many consumers, Walmart serves as the evil corporation prototype, but record numbers shop at the stores for low prices."

In Japan, a committee of journalists and rights activists issues an annual "corporate raspberry award" known as the Most Evil Corporation of the Year Award (also called the Black Company Award) to a company "with a culture of overwork, discrimination and harassment".

After the shooting of Brian Thompson in December 2024, many Americans used social media to express their outrage against health insurance companies and the American healthcare system overall, often using terms associated with the trope to describe these corporations.

== See also ==
- Anti-capitalism
- Anti-consumerism
- Anti-corporate activism
- Big Pharma conspiracy theory
- Business ethics
- Corporate crime
- Corporate warfare
- Criticism of capitalism
- Criticisms of corporations
- Cyberpunk
- Evil Empire
- Human rights § Corporations
- Karen Silkwood
- List of corporate collapses and scandals
- Megacorporation
- Military–industrial complex
- Multinational corporation
- Organized crime
- Prison–industrial complex
- Shareholder primacy
- State crime
- State-corporate crime
- The Corporation (2003 film)
