= Evil Emperor =

Evil Emperor may refer to:

- Evil Emperor Zurg, the main antagonist in the Toy Story franchise
- Palpatine, or Darth Sidious, a character in Star Wars
- Ming the Merciless, a character in the Flash Gordon comic strip and its related movie serials, television series and film adaptation

== See also ==
- Dark Lord, a powerful villain or antagonist with evil henchmen
- Evil empire (disambiguation)
