= Criticisms of corporations =

The notion of a legally sanctioned corporation remains controversial for several reasons, most of which stem from the granting of corporations both limited liability on the part of its members and the status and rights of a legal person. Some opponents to this granting of "personhood" to an organization with no personal liability contend that it creates a legal entity with the extensive financial resources to co-opt public policy and exploit resources and populations without any moral or legal responsibility to encourage restraint.

== Divisions between labor, management, and owners ==
Adam Smith in The Wealth of Nations criticized the joint-stock company corporate form because the separation of ownership and management could lead to inefficient management.

The directors with of such [joint-stock] companies, however, being the managers rather of other people's money than of their own, it cannot well be expected, that they should watch over it with the same anxious vigilance with which the partners in a private copartnery frequently watch over their own.... Negligence and profusion, therefore, must always prevail, more or less, in the management of the affairs of such a company.

The context for Adam Smith's term for "companies" in The Wealth of Nations was the joint-stock company. In the 18th century, the joint-stock company was a distinct entity created by the King of Great Britain as Royal Charter trading companies. These entities were sometimes awarded legal monopoly in designated regions of the world, such as the British East India Company.

Furthermore, the context of the quote points to the complications inherent in chartered joint-stock companies. Each company had a Courts of Governors and day-to-day duties were overseen by local managers. Governor supervision of day-to-day operations was minimal and was exacerbated by the poor communications of the 18th century.

Bribery and corruption were inherent in this type of corporate model because the local managers sought to avoid close supervision by the Courts of Governors, politicians, and Prime Ministers. In these circumstances, Smith did not consider joint-stock company governance to be honest. More importantly, the East India Company demonstrated inherent flaws in the corporate form. The division between owners and managers in a joint-stock company, and the limited legal liability this division was based on guaranteed that stockholders would be apathetic about a company's activities as long as the company continued to be profitable. Just as problematic, the laws of agency upon which the corporate form was based allowed for boards of directors to be so autonomous from and unconstrained by stockholder wishes that directors became negligent and ultimately self-interested in the management of the corporation.

== Psychopathic behavior ==
Legal Scholar and Professor of Law at the University of British Columbia Joel Bakan describes the modern corporate entity as 'an institutional psychopath' and a 'psychopathic creature.' In the documentary The Corporation, Bakan claims that corporations, when considered as natural living persons, exhibit the traits of antisocial personality disorder or psychopathy. Also in the film, Robert A. G. Monks, a former Republican Party candidate for Senate from Maine, says:

The corporation is an externalizing machine (moving its operating costs to external organizations and people), in the same way that a shark is a killing machine.

— Joel Bakan

Writing for the American socialist publication Jacobin, writer and sociologist Nicole Aschoff attributes the "unscrupulous" and "sometimes deadly" behavior of corporations to the "elevation of profit above all else," which she says is "a defining feature of capitalism." She adds that "the catalog of the ethical and moral crimes of corporations is impressive":

Coca-Cola killed trade unionists in Latin America. General Motors built vehicles known to catch fire. Tobacco companies suppressed cancer research. And Boeing knew that its planes were dangerous. Corporations don't care if they kill people — as long as it's profitable.

== Analogy with totalitarian regime ==
Noam Chomsky and others have criticized the legal decisions that led to the creation of the modern corporation:

Corporations, which previously had been considered artificial entities with no rights, were accorded all the rights of persons, and far more, since they are "immortal persons", and "persons" of extraordinary wealth and power. Furthermore, they were no longer bound to the specific purposes designated by State charter, but could act as they choose, with few constraints.

— Noam Chomsky

When the corporatization of the state capitalist societies took place a century ago, in part in reaction to massive market failures, conservatives – a breed that now scarcely exists– objected to this attack on the fundamental principles of classical liberalism. And rightly so. One may recall Adam Smith's critique of the "joint stock companies" of his day, particularly if management is granted a degree of independence; and his attitude toward the inherent corruption of private power, probably a "conspiracy against the public" when businessmen meet for lunch, in his acid view, let alone when they form collectivist legal entities and alliances among them, with extraordinary rights granted, backed, and enhanced by state power.

— Noam Chomsky

Chomsky contends that corporations transfer policy decisions out of the hands of the people and into corporate boardrooms, where public oversight is limited. The extensive financial resources of corporations and the extent to which they're employed to influence political campaigns in the United States has also been implicated as a way in which corporations undermine the democratic institutions in a society.

American philosopher Elizabeth S. Anderson argues that upon entering the corporate workplace, workers in the United States effectively surrender their rights to an "authoritarian private government" which strictly regulates both their work life, and through employment-at-will, their off-duty life by firing workers for lifestyle choices, recreational activities, political speech, social media posts, or voicing criticism about working conditions. She argues this runs contrary to the ideas of early champions of the free market who were progressive thinkers and envisioned the effects of the market being to liberate workers from the control of feudal lords, but in reality this vision evaporated following the Industrial Revolution which established large, hierarchical corporations enforcing a new corporate serfdom, and also by neoliberal orthodoxy which posited that the workplace is a voluntary contract between equals, obscuring that it is a highly asymmetrical relationship.

== Reception ==
"No other institution in American history—not even slavery—has ever been so consistently unpopular...with the American public. It was controversial from the outset, and it has remained controversial to this day."

John D. Rockefeller was one of the first to experience that paradox in a spectacular and personal way. By the last decade of the 19th century, Rockefeller found that he had become "the most hated man in the world."

Around the middle of the 20th century, the economist John Kenneth Galbraith noted that the corporate businesses which foreign visitors came to see and marvel at, as "showpiece[s] of American industrial achievement," were the very same ones that government attorneys scrutinized in their search for monopolistic wrongdoing.

== See also ==
- Anti-corporate activism
- Multinational corporation#Criticism
- Big business#Criticism of big business
- Corporate crime
- Evil corporation
