= Evil empire =

Speculative fiction trope

Banner of the Galactic Empire in the Star Wars franchise

An evil empire is a speculative fiction trope in which a major antagonist of the story is a technologically advanced nation, typically ruled by an evil emperor or empress, that aims to control the world or conquer some specific group. They are opposed by a hero from more common origins who uses their guile or the help of an underground resistance to fight them.

== Characteristics ==
Fantastical evil empires typically make heavy use of technology and mechanization, refusing to coexist with nature and destroying or exploiting it instead. The indiscriminate colonization and subjugation of both land and people are also common. The hero or heroes of the story often make use of natural elements to fight the empire, such as the Ewoks of Endor or the Sandworms of Arrakis. When the empire is defeated, the world returns to its natural state. This is often a metaphor for modern environmental problems caused by the negligence of global superpowers.

== In popular culture ==
Well-known examples are the Galactic Empire in Star Wars (1977), which forms as a result of a fascist auto-coup which abolishes the liberal-democratic Galactic Republic and is opposed by the Rebel Alliance including Luke Skywalker, as well as the Empire of the Known Universe in Dune (1965), whose Emperor plots the downfall of House Atreides, and is opposed by Paul Atreides. Akira Kurosawa's The Hidden Fortress (1958) established the trope of rebels against an evil empire, which inspired Star Wars.

The theme also often appears in video games. A recurring element of the Final Fantasy series is an evil empire as the primary antagonistic faction, starting with Final Fantasy II (1988). It is a major aspect of the story of Final Fantasy VI (1994) in the form of the Gestahl Empire, proceeding onward to Final Fantasy XV (2016), in which the empire of Niflheim conquers the kingdom of Lucis, forcing its heir, Noctis Lucis Caelum, to fight back and reclaim his homeland. In Mother 3 (2006), the protagonist Lucas has his home attacked by the villainous Pigmask Army, which seeks to turn animals into robotic Chimeras and brainwash the land's agrarian inhabitants via Happy Boxes. Half-Life 2 (2004) and its sequels also featured an evil empire as its main antagonist in the form of the multi-dimensional Combine empire.

The title has also been used as a nickname for the New York Yankees. The nickname originated from a comment made to The New York Times by the then team president of the Boston Red Sox, Larry Lucchino.

== Use in politics ==
The concept of an "evil empire" was appropriated from Star Wars by Ronald Reagan, who used it in his 1983 Evil Empire speech to describe the Soviet Union, dramatically raising the stakes in the arms race between it and the United States.

== See also ==
- Evil corporation
- Galactic empire
