= Goong (manhwa) =

2002–2012 manhwa series by Park So-hee

- Cover of the Yen Press edition of Goong vol. 2 ( 2008), art by Park So-hee

궁 RR: Gung MR: Kung
- Genre: Romantic comedy
- Author: Park So-hee
- Publisher: (South Korea) Seoul Munhwasa
- English publisher: (United States) (Canada) Yen Press
- Other publishers: (Japan) Shinshokan (Italy) Flashbook (Vietnam) Kim Dong Publishing House
- Magazine: (South Korea) Wink
- Original run: 2002–2012
- Collected volumes: 27

Goong (Korean: 궁; lit. 'Palace') is a manhwa series by author Park So-hee. It has been adapted into a popular TV drama series of the same name.

== Summary ==
Set in an alternate world where the Korean monarchy still exists, Chae-kyung Shin is an ordinary strong-willed girl who attends the same high school as Shin Lee, the crown prince of Korea. After accidentally witnessing Shin proposing to his girlfriend Hyo-rin and being rejected, Chae-kyung suddenly learns that she will marry Shin and become Crown Princess of Korea. Due to a promise between the former king of Korea and her grandfather, Chae-kyung has been betrothed to the seemingly cold-hearted prince of Korea. Meanwhile, Shin's cousin Yul unexpectedly returns from England with his mother, the wife of the king's deceased older brother — both with their own plans to take what they believe rightfully belong to Yul: the position of the crown prince and Chae-kyung, the girl who was intended to be the wife of the crown prince.

Both unwilling parties agree to the marriage, each with his and her own different motivations for the agreement to marry. Chae-kyung is forced into the difficult and restrictive role of the crown princess, being forced to live in the palace without permission to return home and learn its endless traditions and rituals. Her only comfort appears to be Shin's assurance that he will divorce her if she cannot adjust to palace life. However, they fall deeply in love with one another, in spite of everything that begins to pull them apart.

== Characters ==
- Chae-kyung Shin (신채경, Shin Chae-gyeong)

Chae-kyung is a lively and strong-willed ordinary high school girl who attends the same school as Shin Lee, the Crown Prince of Korea. Although she often seems immature and irritating, she is a kindhearted, innocent, honest person. Because her grandfather was best friends with the previous king of Korea, the previous King dictated that Chae-kyung is to become the Crown Princess, and she will marry the grandson who is the Crown Prince at the time of the marriage. After realizing how her impoverished family would benefit from the marriage, she reluctantly agrees to marry Shin, though palace life causes her to suffer and her health declines. Despite constantly reacting to Shin with irritation, Chae-kyung falls in love with Shin while believing that her love for him is unreciprocated. When Shin finally reveals he returns her feelings, they are forced to divorce due to Yul blackmailing the Queen. Chae-kyung tries to move on with her life, though she finds she is unable to let go of her love for Shin.

- Shin Lee (이신, Lee Shin)

The crown prince of Korea, Shin appears to be a cold and indifferent young man. After his girlfriend Hyo-rin turns down his marriage proposal, he decides to go along with his elders' arranged marriage with Chae-kyung to satisfy them. While initially irritated by her naivete and enthusiasm, he recognizes how genuinely sweet she is, he begins to open his heart to her, and falls deeply in love. Throughout the series, it becomes obvious that inside, he is just a lonely, sensitive, warm and kind young man. As his cousin re-enters the picture after being forced out of the country many years earlier, the prince quickly butts head with him, as Yul is a contender not only for the throne, but for the crown princess Chae-kyung's love. After being forced to divorce Chae-kyung, he becomes determined to find a way for them to be together again, but becomes divided by his responsibilities as the crown prince and his love for her.

- Yul Lee (이율, Lee Yul)

Yul is Shin's cousin; at birth, he was the son of the current king's older brother, who died before becoming king. After living many years abroad in England with his mother, the widow of the former crown prince, he returns to Korea, apparently set on taking back what he believes rightfully belongs to him: his title as crown prince and Chae-kyung, the girl who was intended for the crown prince. While he expresses a kindhearted personality, charisma and good looks make him an instant hit with the girls, Yul hides his twisted and manipulative true nature. Being born as the crown prince he has a prideful and arrogant demeanor and has great contempt for Shin and his parents for taking what he considers his god given right. Originally uninterested in the throne, Yul decides to follow his mother's wishes and compete with Shin for the throne after falling in love with Chae-kyung and resorts to underhanded tactics to obtain both.

- Hyo-rin Seong (성효린, Seong Hyo-rin)

Hyo-rin is a skilled ballerina, as well as a beautiful and intelligent young woman who is Shin's girlfriend at the beginning of the series. However, she rejects Shin's proposal, dismissing it as a joke and being unwilling to give up her dreams to live a cloistered life in the palace. After he marries Chae-kyung, Hyo-rin comes to reject her hasty decision and tries to draw Shin back to her by various means, particularly with the revelation that she can no longer dance due to a leg injury. After realizing that Shin has come to love Chae-kyung, Hyo-rin gives up her attempts, which have come to hurt her more than anyone else. She develops an uncertain friendship with Chae-kyung's younger brother, Chae-jun, who had approached her initially out of fear that Hyo-rin was trying to ruin his sister and brother-in-law's relationship. Though she tries to become Shin's wife after his divorce from Chae-kyung, she ultimately gives up on him after realizing that his heart belongs only to Chae-kyung.

- The King (국왕, Gugwang)

The current King of Korea, Shin's father. The King was actually the second son of the previous king; the death of his older brother resulted in the King's advancement as crown prince when the senate feared what Yul's mother would do if she were to serve as Yul's regent. Though regarded as a wise and dignified man who is respected for his moderate reforms, the King maintains deep guilt for exiling Yul and his mother, particularly after his father had requested that the King make Yul the crown prince rather than Shin. In hopes of resolving the past, the King eventually elects to make Yul the crown prince and give Shin the freedom to remarry Chae-kyung and live as an ordinary person.

- The Queen (중전, Joongjeon)

The Queen of Korea, Shin's mother. Though she comes across as blunt and cold, the Queen loves both her sons greatly and cares for Chae-kyung as her own daughter and is deeply torn when Yul blackmails her into forcing Chae-kyung and Shin's divorce in order to protect the royal family. The incident pushes the queen to move beyond her feelings to only serve as queen to bringing retribution on Yul's mother and Yul for bringing misery upon Shin and the king. Once Yul's blackmail is exposed, the Queen gradually accepts Shin's wish to be with Chae-kyung again and encourages their relationship.

- Grand Royal Queen Dowager (대왕대비, Daewang-daebi)

The dowager queen, Shin and Yul's grandmother. A conservative woman who is the greatest obstacle for the King's attempt to reform the palace and the royal family's role in government, she is a morally upright woman. While in private she is a silly person who is genuinely fond of Chae-kyung's liveliness and appears to want nothing more than for Shin and Chae-kyung to have a child, the Grand Royal Queen Dowager is a politically astute woman who wishes to protect the royal family. Though she was considerably stricter in her youth, the difficulties in Chae-kyung and Shin's relationship has softened her views and she sincerely wants them to be happy together.

- Uibin, the Queen Dowager (대비, Daebi)

Yul's mother, a woman who married the current king's older brother in order to become crown princess. Though she had loved the King in their youth, she chose to marry his older brother out of ambition and the desire to change the palace. However, she and Shin's father maintained an illicit affair for a brief time during their marriages. When her husband died prematurely, she and Yul were exiled to England in order prevent a succession struggle between Yul and Shin. When she and her son return, the beginning of her plan to restore Yul's former position as crown prince is marked by the posthumous promotion of her late husband as a king, resulting in her status as a daebi (queen dowager) in the royal family. She particularly does not like Chae-kyung, regarding her as an empty headed child of common status. Though she is coldhearted and ruthless with her methods, she is a deeply sad woman who only wants Yul to have she believes he deserves.

- Chae-jun Shin (신채준, Shin Chae-jun)

Chae-kyung's younger brother, an innocent boy who is still attending junior high school when Chae-kyung marries Shin. Out of worry for his sister and Shin's relationship, Chae-jun begins following Hyo-rin, believing that she will cause Shin and Chae-kyung to break up. However, Chae-jun begins to fall in love with Hyo-rin after seeing how vulnerable she is under her cool exterior. Though he allows Hyo-rin to depend on him emotionally while she is still interested in Shin, he is angered by Hyo-rin's repeated willingness to take advantage of him in order to separate Chae-kyung and Shin. When Hyo-rin uses his fear that Chae-kyung is the reason behind Yul's attempt to usurp the throne, Chae-jun breaks off their relationship after Chae-kyung is badly injured because of Hyo-rin's machinations. They gradually resume their friendship, once Hyo-rin has given up Shin for good and Chae-jun has managed to forgive her.

- Sun Lee (이선, Lee Seon)

Shin's younger brother, who is born when Shin and Chae-kyung are about eighteen years old. His birth further complicates the plans Yul's mother has to usurp Shin's position as crown prince. In order to protect his mother and Sun, Shin gives up his plans to leave his position as crown prince, which furthers the strain on his relationship with Chae-kyung. A charming and affectionate child, he is well-loved by his family and he looks up to Shin. After Sun innocently remarks on a national interview that his brother wishes to leave his position to Sun in order to remarry Chae-kyung, Shin notices that Sun is surprisingly ambitious and expresses the desire to become king one day.

- Mi-Roo Oh (오미루, Oh Mi-ru)

The daughter of a rich family, Mi-roo is betrothed to Yul against his will. Because of her immature and haughty attitude, she is disliked amongst the palace maids and even Yul's mother, who had chosen her for her status and ambition to become queen. She appears to trust very few people and often deceives others to her advantage. Though she appears interested in Shin, she devotes her affections entirely to Yul after she witnesses his ambition. When she learns that Yul is unwilling to give up his feelings for Chae-kyung, she deliberately plans for Chae-kyung and Shin to meet and give into their feelings for one another. In spite of Yul's revulsion towards her, his attempts to get rid of her only encourage her feelings for him. Yul gradually develops an attachment to her, though apparently unaware of the extent of her two-sided personality.

== Publication ==
Written and illustrated by Park So-hee, Goong was serialized in Seoul Munhwasa's Wink magazine from 2002 to 2011. In July 2020, the manhwa was remastered as a coloured Webtoon by Jaedam Media on KakaoPage.

Yen Press licensed the series in August 2007. The entire series was released in English in 18 omnibus volumes.

== Live-action adaptations ==
In 2006, a live-action television adaptation of the manhwa was broadcast from 11 January to 30 March 2006 on Munhwa Broadcasting Corporation (MBC), starring Yoon Eun-hye, Ju Ji-hoon, Kim Jeong-hoon and Song Ji-hyo.

In 2010, a theatrical musical spin-off of the television drama, Goong: Musical (뮤지컬 궁) premiered. It starred Kim Kyu-jong of SS501 as male lead Lee Shin, where he also performed Kyoto on 11 June 2011. It also starred U-Know Yunho of TVXQ.
