= Cynical Orange =

Manhwa by Yoon JiUn

- Cover for the korean version of volume 1

시니컬 오렌지 Sinikeol orenji
- Genre: Romance
- Author: Yoon JiUn
- Publisher: Seoul Cultural
- English publisher: (United States) iceKunion (United States) Yen Press
- Original run: 2002
- Volumes: 9

Cynical Orange (Korean: 시니컬 오렌지) is a manhwa created by Yoon JiUn.

In the United States iceKunion originally held the license; Yen Press later took the license.

In the series, Hwang Hyemin, a girl with a beautiful face and "sincere" personality, receives adoration from boys and jealous hatred from other girls at her school. Hyemin hides her "cynical and dark side" and adopts "an innocent face" to attract her "secret crush" JongYon. When she discovers that JongYon does not like her, she sheds her previous persona and attacks MaHa, a "playboy."
