= Demon Lord =

Demon lord or Demon Lord may refer to:

- Demon lord (Dungeons & Dragons), a type of monster in the role-playing game Dungeons & Dragons
- Demon Lord Dante, a manga series by Go Nagai
- Demon Lord of Karanda, a 1988 David Eddings novel
- Demon Lord, Retry!, a 2017 light novel and manga series adapted into an anime television series in 2019
- Demon Lord 2099, a 2021 light novel series adapted into an anime television series in 2024
- Lord Demon, a 1999 Roger Zelazny novel
- Shin Hae-chul (1968–2014), South Korean singer-songwriter and record producer affectionally nicknamed "Demon Lord" (마왕, mawang)

== See also ==
- Dark Lord (disambiguation)
- Demon King (disambiguation)
