= Martin & John =

Manhwa by Park Hee-jung (2006–2011)

마틴&존 RR: Matin & Jon MR: Mat'in & Chon
- Genre: Romance, Boys' Love
- Author: Park Hee-jung
- Publisher: (South Korea) Seoul Munhwasa
- English publisher: (United States) Tokyopop (1 volume)
- Magazine: (South Korea) Wink
- Original run: 2006–2011
- Collected volumes: 12

Martin & John is manhwa by Park Hee-jung.

== Plot ==
Three Martins and Three Johns are living in different places and loving each other. The series is a collection of stories set in different times and places, all involving a man named Martin and a man named John, and the struggle for love between them.
