= Evil Empire =

An evil empire is a speculative fiction trope.

Evil Empire may also refer to:

- Evil Empire speech, given by U.S. President Ronald Reagan referring to the Soviet Union in 1983

== Arts and entertainment ==
- Evil Empire (album), by Rage Against the Machine, 1996
- The Evil Empire: 101 Ways That England Ruined the World, a 2007 book by Steven Grasse
- "Evil Empire", a 1989 song by Joe Jackson from Blaze of Glory
- Evil Empire (company), a French video game development studio spun off from Motion Twin

== Sports teams with the nickname ==
- Edmonton Elks, Canadian Football League
- New England Patriots, National Football League
- New York Yankees, Major League Baseball

== See also ==
- Evil Emperor (disambiguation)
