= Good Lord (disambiguation) =

Good Lord was a New Zealand thoroughbred racehorse.

Good Lord may also refer to:

- "Good Lord" (song), a 2019 song by Birds of Tokyo
- God
- Jesus in Christianity (0s BC–30s AD)
- Guru Nanak (1469 AD-1539 AD)

== See also ==
- Dark Lord (disambiguation)
