= Hissing (manhwa) =

2004–2005 manhwa series by Kang EunYoung

- ICEkunion edition of Hissing

히싱 RR: Hising MR: Hising
- Genre: Romance
- Author: Kang Eun-young
- Publisher: (South Korea) Seoul Cultural Publishers, Inc.
- English publisher: (Canada) (United Kingdom) (United States) Yen Press (Canada) (United States) ICEkunion (former)
- Magazine: (South Korea) Wink
- Collected volumes: 6

Hissing (Korean: 히싱) is a Korean manhwa series written and illustrated by Kang Eun-young. Originally serialized in the magazine Wink, Hissing was later released in 6 volumes between January 2004 and August 2005 by Seoul Cultural Publishers, Inc. ICEkunion licensed the series for an English release and published 3 volumes, but was absorbed into the Hachette Book Group USA's graphic novel imprint Yen Press. Yen Press continued to release Hissing, and the final volume was made available in March 2009. Western critics gave the series mixed reviews, with its art and storytelling both criticized and applauded.

== Media ==
Hissing, written and illustrated by Kang Eun-young, was published in Korea by Seoul Cultural Publishers, Inc. The manhwa was serialized in the magazine Wink and collected into 6 volumes. Hissing's serialization in Wink ended in the magazine's August 2005 issue, published on July 15, 2005. Seoul Cultural released the first volume on January 15, 2004 and the final volume on August 11, 2005. Publisher ICEkunion acquired the rights to publish the series in North America and proceeded to release the first three volumes between June 2006 and February 2007. ICEkunion was later absorbed by Yen Press, a graphic novel imprint of Hachette Book Group USA. Yen Press inherited ICEkunion's entire catalog and subsequently resumed publishing Hissing under their label. Their distribution rights for the series extended to the United States, Canada, and the United Kingdom. Yen Press released the remaining volumes of Hissing between July 2008 and March 2009.

=== Volume list ===
No.	Original release date	Original ISBN	North America release date	North America ISBN
1	January 15, 2004	8953248639	June 2006	978-89-527-4463-0
2	May 17, 2004	8953252024	September 2006	978-89-527-4495-1
3	August 28, 2004	8953255465	February 2007	978-89-527-4700-6
4	January 1, 2005	8953258596	July 2008	978-0-7595-2883-3
5	April 25, 2005	8953261325	November 2008	978-0-7595-2884-0
6	August 11, 2005	8953264693	March 2009	978-0-7595-2885-7

== Reception ==
Hissing has received mixed reviews from Western critics. Patricia Bear of Mania gave the fourth volume an overall grade of "B+", and recommended it as a "lovely and moving story". Beard praised how "EunYoung Kang [sic] gives her characters the time and space to show what they're experiencing rather than telling the readers of the romance as a statement of fact", which she felt allowed "the irrationality of love" to be "believable". Beard went on to say that the art had flaws, but could be "very beautiful and expressive", and that leaving out backgrounds in some scenes "[emphasized] the emotional experience and reflection of the character". However, Library Journal's Krista Hutley did not recommend the series. She noted that "poor dialog, hard-to-follow viewpoint shifts, and "mysterious" plotting" caused attempts to "build suspense" to "fail". Hutley also criticized that the "two male leads [were] confusingly indistinguishable from each other".

Michelle Smith reviewed volumes four through six for PopCulture Shock. Volumes four and five were collectively rated with a "B"; Smith wrote that though she disliked the first volume, the series "grew" on her and that flaws in the series "grow less glaring with time". The sixth and final volume of Hissing was graded with a "B+". She commented that it was a "very satisfying" final volume, with "a good balance between humorous and more emotional moments". She stated that the "only complaint [she] could make [was] that Sun-Nam’s irritating brothers made it all the way through the series without contributing much of anything to the story".
