= Enterprise cognitive system =

Computing system

Enterprise cognitive systems (ECS) are part of a broader shift in computing, from a programmatic to a probabilistic approach, called cognitive computing. An Enterprise Cognitive System makes a new class of complex decision support problems computable, where the business context is ambiguous, multi-faceted, and fast-evolving, and what to do in such a situation is usually assessed today by the business user. An ECS is designed to synthesize a business context and link it to the desired outcome. It recommends evidence-based actions to help the end-user achieve the desired outcome. It does so by finding past situations similar to the current situation, and extracting the repeated actions that best influence the desired outcome.

While general-purpose cognitive systems can be used for different outputs, prescriptive, suggestive, instructive, or simply entertaining, an enterprise cognitive system is focused on action, not insight, to help in assessing what to do in a complex situation.

== Key characteristics ==
ECS have to be:

1. Adaptive: They must learn as information changes, and as goals and requirements evolve. They must resolve ambiguity and tolerate unpredictability. They must be engineered to feed on dynamic data in real time, or near real time. In the Enterprise, near-real time learning from data requires an agile information federation approach to ingest incremental data updates as they occur, and an unsupervised learning approach to ensure that new best practice is leveraged across the organization in a timely manner.
2. Interactive: They must interact easily with users so that those users can define their needs comfortably. They may also interact with other processors, devices, and Cloud services, as well as with people. In the Enterprise, interactions are controlled via existing workflows and UIs. Therefore, embedding best practices directly into these existing interfaces, in the context of a specific step, is critical to ensure maximum end-user adoption.
3. Iterative and stateful: They must aid in defining a problem by asking questions or finding additional source input if a problem statement is ambiguous or incomplete. They must “remember” previous interactions in a process and return information that is suitable for the specific application at that point in time. In the Enterprise, business context is often structured by a business process, and therefore sufficiently data-rich to make relevant recommendations without significant iterations from the end-user. A stateful memory of overall interactions across communication channels is critical for understanding of context, as a static profile will not capture intent and outcome potential the way behavior does.
4. Contextual: They must understand, identify, and extract contextual elements such as meaning, syntax, time, location, appropriate domain, regulations, user's profile, process, task and goal. They may draw on multiple sources of information, including both structured and unstructured digital information, as well as sensory inputs (visual, gestural, auditory, or sensor-provided). In the Enterprise, Context is fragmented and must be aggregated across data types, sources, and locations. In most business environments, such data is captured in existing enterprise information systems, and the effort is linked to quickly source and unify such information. It is rare to have to directly process sensor, audio or visual data in real-time as direct input into the enterprise cognitive system. Instead, these data types are captured by Enterprise Applications and pre-processed into a binary or text format prior to consumption by the System.

== Business applications powered by an ECS ==
- Bottlenose – trends and brands monitoring
- Cybereason – security threat monitoring
- Dataminr – social media monitoring
