= Demon Diary =

Comic series

- Cover of the Tokyopop edition of Demon Diary vol. 1 (2005), art by Kara

마왕일기 RR: Mawang ilgi MR: Mawang ilgi
- Genre: Action/adventure, comic fantasy
- Author: Lee Jeehyung (volume 1); Lee Yun-hee (volumes 2 - 7)
- Illustrator: Kara
- Publisher: (South Korea) Sigongsa
- English publisher: (United States) (Canada) Tokyopop (Australia) (New Zealand) Madman Entertainment
- Other publishers: (Germany) Tokyopop (France) Saphira (Denmark) (Norway) (Sweden) Mangismo (Czech Republic) Talpress (Poland) Kasen Comics (Italy) Free Books (Hungary) Fumax
- Volumes: 7

Demon Diary (Korean: 마왕일기; lit. 'Diary of a Demon King') is a 7-volume soonjung Japanese style manhwa (Korean comic) illustrated by Kara. "Kara" is the name of the duo team consisting of Kim Yoon-gyeong and Jeong Eun-sook. The name Kara is taken from the Hebrew Bible - Jeremiah 35:17 - and it means "to invite". Demon Diary was originally published by Sigongsa and has been licensed in North America by Tokyopop. In Scandinavia, it was published by Mangismo between 2005-2006.

A number of writers have worked with Kara on the production of Demon Diary. The story for volume 1 was written by Lee Jeehyung. Lee stopped writing, because he had to prepare for the upcoming high school exams. The stories for volumes 2 through 7 were written by Lee Yun-hee.

== Story ==
Demon Diary is a light story about Raenef, a newly appointed Demon Lord, and Eclipse, his instructor, who is both a powerful demon and a veteran of a human-versus-demon war. Because of his actions during the Hangma War (which are not elaborated upon), he became known for his cruelty and incredible power. However, when attempting to teach Raenef, Eclipse's 'anger' is often played for laughs.

== Characters ==
Raenef V

A sweet, somewhat naive boy who is the complete opposite of a proper Demon Lord. Though he drives Eclipse to endless distraction, he warms the stoic demon's heart quite quickly. Despite his happy-go-lucky personality (even as a thief), he harbors a dark past, which includes joining the thieves' guild in order to survive because he was an orphan. At first, he is quite an idiot but somewhat cute. However, as the series progresses, he becomes weary of his own sweetness and another side of his personality is revealed. The "other Raenef" is a particularly cruel Demon Lord with high intelligence and a strong grasp of magic. In the end, the two personalities are blended. Raenef IV said he is his child.

Eclipse

A powerful and ancient high ranking demon whose occupation consists of serving those of the Raenef name. It is revealed that his services are highly sought after by many demon lords. He is charged with finding the newest Lord Raenef (Raenef V) and educating him. Though the newest demon lord never ceases to annoy and exasperate him, he comes to care very deeply for the innocent boy. He and Raenef IV are implied to have had a relatively close relationship, which becomes a point of conflict later in the series.

Erutis

A young Swordsmaster and former mercenary who originally came to kill the "fearsome demon lord," only to find Raenef. Not believing that such a naive, innocent boy could be an evil demon lord, she tried to leave, only to be attacked by a somewhat miffed Raenef. Though she easily beats him in a fight, when she tried to kill him, her sword broke, leaving her with no weapon. Thinking quickly, she managed to trick Raenef into thinking that she would work as a henchman for him. Her intentions were to slip away once he fell asleep. Unfortunately, she ran into Eclipse, who trapped her in a bubble shield and later coerces her into really becoming a servant. Her ambiguous gender becomes a running joke throughout the series (in a character omake, she is seen kicking the artist and writer for deliberately making her seem so boyish). Despite her role as comic relief for most of the series, she is quite skilled as a warrior, with an enchanted blade (which unfortunately broke when Raenef defended himself), replaced with a handmade wooden sword that she is able to use almost as well because of her abilities as a Swordsmaster. To her dismay, her fearsome temper only attracts the attentions of the eccentric Demon Lord Krayon, who insists on following her around and quite inadvertently gets her a position as the head of her own mercenary group.

Chris

He is a hot-headed, over-zealous High-Priest-in-training. Chris accidentally summons Raenef with a summoning circle, almost causing another war. Because of his infraction, the High Priest sends Chris to Raenef's palace to learn some humility. With his delusions of grandeur, Chris acts as another source of comic relief. However, like most of the characters, he has a tragic past. As a child, he watched as his mother was killed and his entire village was destroyed by demons, leaving him in a catatonic state. The High Priest of Rased saved him in time, only to be visited by the God of Light, Rased, who had chosen to protect the boy, declaring that Chris was "someone very precious" to him. Though it is yet to be seen how important Chris is to the demon and human world, it is only due to Chris's clerical magic that an evil Raenef is able to be stalled and weakened long enough to be stabilized.

Meruhesae

She is one of the main Demon Elders. She is a seductive and elegant female demon also known for her abilities as a seer. She directs Eclipse to the location of Raenef V and is one of the few characters able to unsettle the normally stoic demon. Flirtatious and somewhat vain, she has a serious side, revealed in her particular relationship with the previous Raenef. She particularly likes to annoy Eclipse, who has a curious dislike of her, asking for "payment" for her services. In the case of information on Raenef V, she asks for a kiss--however, she simply kisses Eclipse on the forehead. She states her reasoning as not wanting to bring on the wrath of Eclipse's fans by going for more.

Krayon

He is one of the five elders. He is a very eccentric and flamboyant demon who nevertheless is not to be underestimated (As shown in the last volume when he burns down a town after a family there "wronged" Euritis). He is the Demon Lord of Dreams, therefore he is able to throw Raenef, Erutis, and Chris into a dream world when he comes to the castle to buy Eclipse's services from Raenef. During the ensuing battle with the trio, he comes to be particularly attracted to Erutis, who blanches at his declarations of love. He goes as far as to ask Raenef IV to protect her if any upheavals were to happen in the demon world and ceaselessly follows her around. He took care of Raenef IV and tutored him at one point (when both were much younger), and seems to be somewhat wary of the other Demon Lord.

Raenef IV

He is the previous Demon Lord Raenef. A powerful Demon Lord, he specialized in incantations, written spells that increase the user's power tremendously when memorized or written correctly. Much of him is shrouded in mystery, particularly the circumstances of his death. Though he is portrayed as eccentric and even a little mischievous (particularly by a very irritated Krayon, who had to "tutor" the younger demon lord in years past), he is ruthless and somewhat self-serving. Though he has been dead for some time, his spirit still appears, though the older demons Meruhesae and Krayon don't seem to be particularly ruffled by his apparition. It is revealed that Raenef IV caused his own death to avoid a powerful curse, called "the Destruction of the Name," placed on him during the war. He had a particularly close relationship with Eclipse, which could echo the latter's growing bond with Raenef V.

Leeche

A young girl from a noble human family who runs off to find adventure and/or kill the Demon Lord. She drugs the actual Demon Lord's bride - a young human maiden sent off to marry the Demon Lord in order to please him - and takes her place. She meshes quite well with Chris, although they fight a lot, they agree on one thing: they must kill the Demon Lord. However, as Leeche got to know Raenef better, she found out that he isn't at all like the Demon Lord she expected. Her father comes with the actual Demon Lord's bride and brings her home, along with the bride after Raenef - by the way of Eclipse - refuses the bride. Before she leaves, she confesses her love for Raenef with a kiss on his lips (Eclipse and Leeche's father are shocked and pull them apart quickly). She said that Raenef should wait ten years and that she wouldn't forgive him if he finds another girl and marries her.
