= Mini-Microsoft =

Defunct unofficial blog about Microsoft

Mini-Microsoft is a blog that was maintained by an anonymous author who appeared to be a Microsoft employee. The site credited its sole author as "Who da'Punk", but many readers referred to him (Note: The author has not made his identity public, although he has identified himself as male in interviews and in some blog posts.) as "Mini" or "Mini-Microsoft". The nominal goal of the blog was to shrink Microsoft down to a smaller, more efficient company, but the blog also served as a forum where Microsoft employees and others engaged in discussion about the company and about its corporate culture. It was last updated in 2014.

== History ==
Mini-Microsoft began on July 6, 2004 with a post entitled "Blast off for Mini-Microsoft". Throughout 2005, the site began to gather attention. The blog’s author was interviewed for an article in the September 26, 2005 issue of Business Week, part of a cover package about trouble at Microsoft. In April 2006, Robert Scoble, who was then a Microsoft employee, wrote on his personal blog that Mini-Microsoft was "doing a lot of good for the company" and that Scoble would "quit on the spot" if the anonymous author were fired. After a May 27, 2006 article by Danny Westneat in The Seattle Times, in which the blog's author admitted that his secret identity was wearing on him, he announced on his blog that he was taking a break and switched to posting very terse posts with links to other sites. He returned to his previous article format a few months later. The author announced another hiatus in February 2009, saying that he was considering leaving the company; in response, the local TechFlash blog suggested, "He should just reveal his identity, and see what happens."

The publication pace of Mini-Microsoft slowed from 2006 to 2012. Since July 2012, only three posts have appeared: one in November 2012 commenting on the departure of then-Windows head Steven Sinofsky, another in August 2013 commenting on the announcement of Steve Ballmer's retirement, and one in July 2014 commenting on a Microsoft announcement of upcoming job cuts.

== Issues discussed ==
The anonymous author was particularly critical of Microsoft's performance review system, writing in 2006, "I'd love our review and compensation system to be so straightforward and fair that it just fades into the background of everyday worklife." In May 2006, Microsoft announced myMicrosoft, a series of changes including a new performance review system, improved compensation, and new perks, to improve employee morale and retention. Lisa Brummel, Microsoft's head of human resources, told the Seattle Times in October 2006 that she planned to start an internal blog called InsideMS where employees can discuss issues with each other, anonymously if they so preferred. Brummel said that she intended to contribute to discussions on InsideMS herself, and that she read Mini-Microsoft but did not engage in discussion there, because she did not know whether external blogs' contributors were currently Microsoft employees. Robert Scoble credited the Mini-Microsoft blog's author with inspiring myMicrosoft. In March 2007, a post on Mini-Microsoft said that "this blog and its conversation changed pretty dramatically when InsideMS came on the internal Microsoftie scene". The anonymous author suggested that Microsoft should replace InsideMS, whose anonymous commenting features were reportedly removed, with an internal blog written by senior leaders at the company.

The Financial Times described Mini-Microsoft in 2007 as having "become a soap box for employee discontent over the past three years." The FT described the site as being a resource for details of managerial pay packages, employee bonuses, and stock grants. At the time, similarly-named sites existed for the company's Indian and French offices.

== Impact ==
Mini-Microsoft was one of the first successful examples of an unofficial blog that was written by a major tech company employee and that was open to the general public. Previously, corporate confidentiality and communications policies, along with the lack of attention paid to social media, limited such blogs' reach. The Financial Times in 2009 noted that Microsoft's attitude to employee-run blogs was "relaxed" compared with most companies. A member of the company's business strategy division estimated that 5,000 to 6,000 Microsoft employees wrote blogs.

The anonymous blogger, nicknamed "Microsoft's Deep Throat" by Business Week, became popular among reporters as a source for leads on news stories about the company. Rob Enderle wrote in 2007 that he considered Mini-Microsoft a "guilty pleasure" and praised the blogger for mixing thoughtful criticism and actionable recommendations. Individual posts on the blog were cited as sources in news reporting. Steven Sinofsky wrote in 2022 about the blogger, whose identity he did not know, "… they were a fixture over everything that was going on at Microsoft, even if I chose to ignore them the rest of the Windows team and the company followed every word (and so did the press)." Sinofsky wrote that he was challenged to respond to the blog's critiques, and that it was difficult to do so, because "Mini [the blogger] did not always have the complete context."

Alex Shin, head of operations at TeamBlind, ran a branding campaign in 2016 for the Blind social media app by referring to it as "Mini-Microsoft 2.0". Shin credited this campaign with the increase in Microsoft employees' presence on Blind, an anonymous social media app for discussion of employee concerns, from 1,000 employees to over 10,000.
