= Yun Mi-kyung =

South Korean manhwa artist (born 1980)

- Born: October 14, 1980 (age 46)
- Area: Artist
- Notable works: Bride of the Water God

- Yun Mi-kyung
- Hangul: 윤미경
- RR: Yun Migyeong
- MR: Yun Migyŏng

Yun Mi-kyung (Korean: 윤미경; born October 14, 1980) is a South Korean manhwa artist best known for her work Bride of the Water God.

== Career ==
Yun received the silver medal in the New Artist Debut Competition for her work Na-eu Ji-gu Bang-moon-gi (The Journey of my Earth Visit) in 2003.

She received a Best New Artist award from the Dokja Manhwa prize organization for Railroad in 2004.

Currently working on Bride of the Water God in the magazine Wink.

== Works ==
- A Cat that Loved a Fish
- Railroad
- Bride of the Water God
