= One Thousand and One Nights (manhwa) =

South Korean manhwa

- Cover of the Yen Press edition of One Thousand and One Nights vol. 1 (2005), art by Han Seung-he
- Genre: Fantasy
- Author: Jeon Jin-seok
- Illustrator: Han Seung-he
- Publisher: (South Korea) Seoul Munhwasa
- English publisher: (United States) Yen Press

One Thousand and One Nights (천일야화 Cheon-il-ya-hwa) is a Korean manhwa written by Jeon JinSeok (전진석 Jeon Jin-seog) and illustrated by Han SeungHee (한승희 Han Seung-hui). It is a different take on the events of the original One Thousand and One Nights story, where the main character dresses up like a woman to take his sister's place in the sultan's harem. There are eleven volumes, all of which have been published in English.

== Synopsis ==
The story begins with the mad sultan Shahryar preparing to bed his latest wife by telling her he will have her beheaded at sunrise. Upon kissing her the Shahryar discovers that his "bride" is in reality a beautiful young man -- the "Scheherazade" of the original story (Korean 셰에라자드 Sye'ela-jadeu) is now "Sehera" (셰에라 Sye'ela) -- who had pretended to be a girl in order to give his younger sister Dunya (두냐자드 Du'nya-jadeu) time to flee to China with a book seller. Thrown into prison, Sehera meets Jafar, Shahryar's former vizier and friend, who tells Sehera the history and fate of Fatima, Shahryar's adulterous wife who was originally his father's latest concubine; unknown to all, Sehera's plan was inspired by Shahryar having mistaken him for her while delirious from an almost successful assassination attempt. When Shahryar entered the cell with the intention of executing them, Sehera says he would happily die for Shahryar if his death gave him peace of mind but wants to tell him a story first, saying Shahryar is free to do as he wishes afterwards.

== The Tales ==
- Turandot
- Cho-yong
- Cleopatra
- The Angel and the Woodsman (Korean form of the Swan Maiden)
- Socrates and Alcibiades
- Romance of the Three Kingdoms, detailing Guan Yu's short service under Cao Cao
