= 11th Cat =

South Korean manhwa

- Cover of the Yen Press edition of 11th Cat vol. 5 (2007), art by Kim Mi-kyung

열한번째 고양이 RR: Yeolhan beonjjae goyangi MR: Yŏrhan pŏntchae koyangi
- Genre: Romantic fantasy
- Author: Kim Mi-kyung
- Publisher: (South Korea) Danbi
- English publisher: (United States) Yen Press
- Other publishers: (Germany) Tokyopop
- Original run: 2002
- Volumes: 5

11th Cat (Korean: 열한번째 고양이) is a fictional fantasy/romance Korean manhwa written by Kim Mi-kyung. It follows Rika, a spunky, yet clumsy, and forgetful girl who hopes to become a wizard, and her friends on their adventures.

== Storyline ==
Cute and charming, yet not so bright little Rika is training to become a real wizard. The first step is to find a magic staff. Ah, that can't be too hard, can it? As Rika and Eujen journey deep into the forest in search of this wonderful magic staff, Rika loses her way. She winds up in an unfortunate chance encounter with the dark sorcerer who kidnapped the princess! Will Rika be able to free the princess and become a real wizard? Follow this cute fantasy story with Rika and find out.

== Characters ==
Rika

Spunky but clumsy Rika is a novice wizard in training. She lives with her aunts and uncles. Though her aunts and uncles aren't her real family, Rika loves them like her real family. It is also later revealed that her father is Arthur and her mother is Priscilla. The reason the Sword Master of Black Iron befriended Rika was to grain her trust so he could carry out his plan to sacrifice her to revive her dead father, Arthur. Arthur is revived, but Rika still lives due to her second life. Rika had two lives, and only one died when she was sacrificed. Rika was only with her father for a short time, but the White Dragon mentioned that the day Rika met her father, she began to improve her skill day by day. Now Rika has set off to find her cat friend Nomi with the help of the White Dragon.

Nomi (Guardian Spirit of Black Wishstone)

Nomi is a cute cat guardian spirit that came out from the Black Wishstone. He likes Rika since she's the first female owner of the Wishstone and travels alongside her. He's loud and obnoxious, but is quite powerful despite his appearance. It is said that he once served the Sword Master of Black Iron.

Arthur

Arthur is married to Priscilla and the father of Rika. He is also the sword master of Black Iron best friend and the most powerful wizard that ever live. Though he is dead he is later revived by the Murika stone and his daughter's life, which the Sword Master of Black Iron used to revived him. Arthur deeply loves his daughter and wife, whom he cares for. He didn't want to be brought to life again because he knew that he had broken every law of nature just to be alive and that he is an unnatural being that shouldn't exist because he was already dead. He has no more magic after being brought to life, it was explained that he knew that his friend, the Sword Master of Black Iron was going to ignore his wish to remain dead. He was not going to let his daughter be an ordinary wizard so he transferred all his powers to his daughter, Rika. He knew all those powers were maintaining her other life, so when the Sword Master of Black Iron killed her to bring Arthur to life, Arthur knew that his daughter would survive. Arthur only lived for a while, but he was happy that he got to see his little daughter Rika grown up and his wife Priscilla one more time. He killed himself because he didn't want to carry the shameful existence clinging to his lifeless body.

Priscilla

Priscilla is married to Arthur and the mother of Rika. She loves both her daughter and husband. Although she was never there for Rika, she loves Rika and considers herself a bad mother because she never lifted a finger to help her daughter and because she couldn't take care of her. This is because Priscilla knew if she did she would sacrifice her own daughter life for Arthur as she dearly love him and wanted to see him again so she gave Rika to Louis who does care for and love Rika as if she was his daughter.
