= Story generator =

Tool to generate story ideas

A story generator or plot generator is a tool that generates basic narratives or plot ideas. The generator could be in the form of a computer program, a chart with multiple columns, a book composed of panels that flip independently of one another, or a set of several adjacent reels that spin independently of one another, allowing a user to select elements of a narrative plot. The tool may allow the user to select elements for the narrative, or it may combine them randomly, a specific variation known as a random plot generator. Such tools can be created for virtually any genre, although they tend to produce formulaic and hackneyed situations.

== Overview ==
Plot generators were described as early as the late 1920s, with Plotto; a new method of plot suggestion for writers of creative fiction, by William Wallace Cook, appearing in 1928. Plotto is a non-random plot generator; the reader makes all the decisions within the framework set out by the book.

In an article originally published in 1935 and reprinted in 2002, Robert J. Hogan described a book-based device called the Plot Genie which consisted of three lists of 180 items each: murder victims in the first list, crime locations in the second list, and important clues in the third list. The item to use from each list was chosen by spinning a dial with 180 numbers on it. Plot Genie (formally Plot Robot) was developed over the course of sixteen years by Wycliffe A. Hill and published around 1931. Hogan also mentions other similar devices such as The 36 Dramatic Situations (described by Polti in 1895, who claims to have improved on the work of Carlo Gozzi, 1720–1806) and Plotto (see above).

The earliest computerized story generator was TALE-SPIN, an artificial intelligence program developed in the 1970s. More recently in the 1990s, the computer program MEXICA was developed for academic research into automated plot generation. It produces plots related to the Mexica people. Using an approach similar to that of MEXICA, the program ProtoPropp generates stories related to Russian folklore. There are a large number of "random plot generators" available on the internet—generic and relating to specific fandoms, with a certain amount of academic research into the subject.

The term story generator algorithms (SGAs) refers to computational procedures resulting in an artifact that can be considered a story. In the field of Artificial Intelligence (AI), the automated generation of stories has been a subject of research for over fifty years. An algorithm is understood as a set of instructions that, when applied to a given input, produces an output. In the present context, the desired output is a story. The underlying concept of “story” in SGAs is functional and does not imply any aesthetic notion. This is important because it sets the context for evaluation of generated stories, for which having a surface realization as a readable and appealing text is not necessarily a core issue.

GPT-2 (2019) could be used to generate stories, if given appropriate prompts. "TalkToTransformer.com", released later that year, offered an accessible front-end to the public to use GPT-2's technology to generate stories. AI Dungeon, also layered on GPT-2, debuted in December 2019, and by August 2020 reportedly claimed over a million active monthly users.
