= Prince of Darkness (Satan) =

Term for Satan from Paradise Lost

The Prince of Darkness is a term used in John Milton's poem Paradise Lost referring to Satan as the embodiment of evil. It is an English translation of the Latin phrase princeps tenebrarum, which occurs in the Acts of Pilate, written in the 4th century, in the Historia Francorum by Gregory of Tours (6th century), in the 11th-century hymn Rhythmus de die mortis by Pietro Damiani, and in a sermon by Bernard of Clairvaux from the 12th century.

== See also ==
- Beelzebub
- Dark lord
- Devil in Christianity
- Lucifer
- Ozzy Osbourne
- Peter Mandelson
- Prince of Darkness (Manichaeism)
- Janez Janša
- Tomislav Tomašević
