= Sigongsa =

South Korean publishing company

- Founded: 17 August 1990
- Country of origin: South Korea
- Official website: www.sigongsa.com

Sigongsa. Co., Ltd. (Korean: 시공사) is a South Korean publishing media group (including sub-businesses Sigong Books, Sigong Junior, and Sigong Magazines) that produces magazines, books, and digital content. The group launched in 1990, and published a vast number of manhwa, working with the biggest North American comic book companies such as Tokyopop, Image Comics, and Dream Wave Productions. In 2005, the company's sales hit 60 million dollars and was ranked as the top publisher in South Korea. Currently the business publishes three main magazines: Stereo Sound, CASA Living, Chronos, and numerous books every year.
