= Dark lord =

Fantastical stock antagonist characterized by immense villainy and power

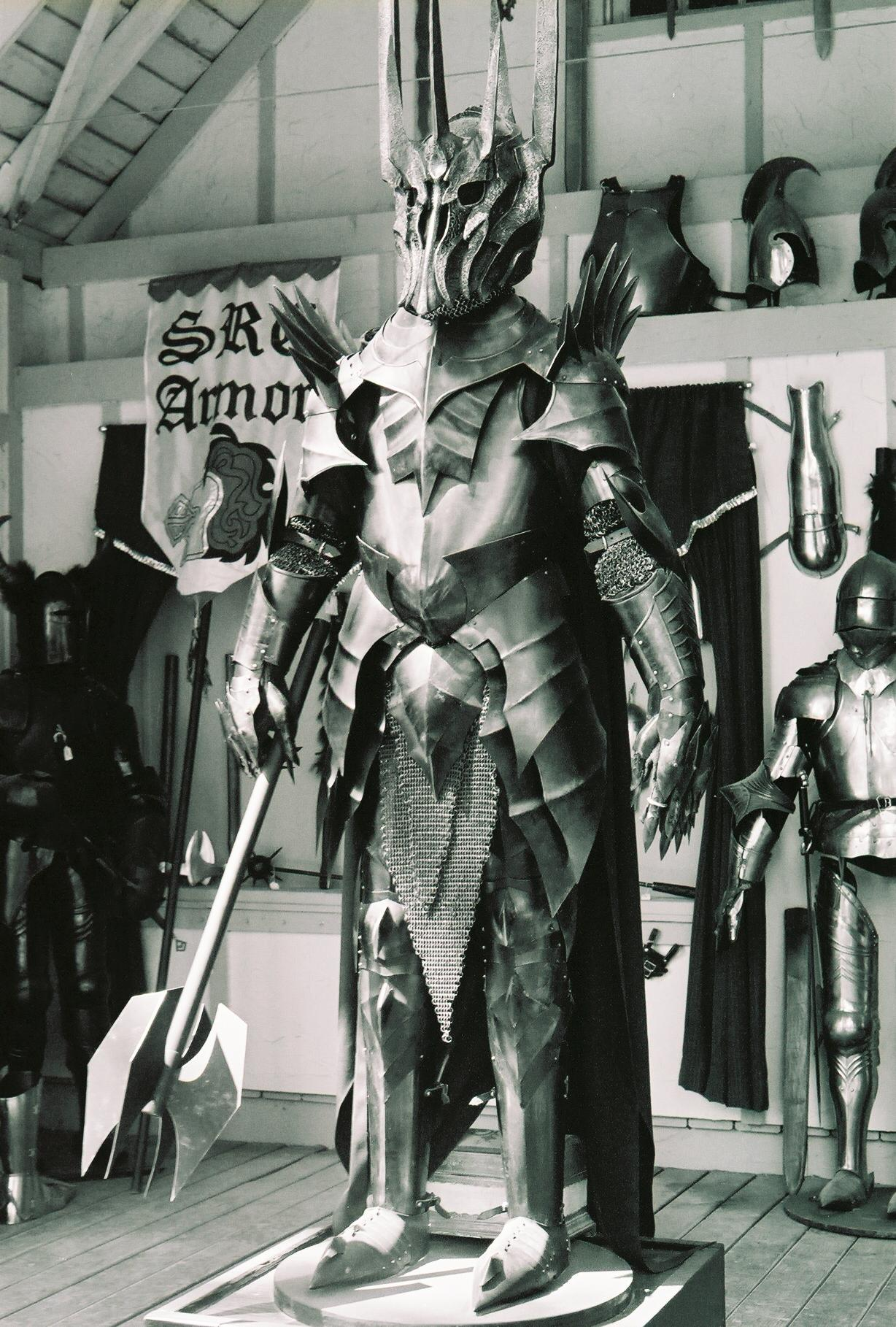
The armor design of the dark lord Sauron, as depicted in Peter Jackson's Lord of the Rings trilogy

In fiction and mythology, a dark lord (sometimes capitalized as Dark Lord or referred to as an evil overlord or evil emperor) is an antagonistic archetype, acting as the pinnacle of villainy and evil within a typically heroic narrative.

== Description ==
The term and similar concepts enjoy widespread popularity as a stock character and a villainous moniker in fantasy and related genres as well as in literary analysis of such works. As the name implies, a dark lord is characterized as a given setting's embodiment of evil, darkness, or death (either metatextually or as literal figure within a work's mythopoeia) in a position of immense power, most often as a leader or emperor with a variety of minions and/or lesser villains at their disposal to influence their conflict against a heroic protagonist in a primarily indirect way, though they may additionally be depicted as wielding great physical or magical capabilities should a hero ever confront them personally.

There is a wealth of literary, folkloric, and theological precedent for the idea of a dark lord, including the Celtic Balor, the Christian Lucifer, (known in Latin as the Princeps Tenebrarum, the Prince of Darkness in Milton's Paradise Lost) and various other chthonic figures or evil kings and sorcerers. The concept was developed throughout the nineteenth century with characters such as Richard Wagner's Alberich or Bram Stoker's Count Dracula, before crystalizing in 1954 with the character of Sauron in J. R. R. Tolkien's epic fantasy novel The Lord of the Rings, from which the archetype most often takes its name. Later The Silmarillion would focus on the character of Morgoth, of whom Sauron was the principal lieutenant and then successor, while other works would further popularize and diversify the concept with antagonists such as Darkseid in the DC Universe, Emperor Palpatine in the science fantasy Star Wars saga, or Lord Voldemort in the Harry Potter series. More recent works sometimes also move away from the archetype's mythic origins in favour of historical allusions to infamous conquerors and dictators such as Julius Caesar or Adolf Hitler.

== Characteristics ==
Dark lord figures are characterized by aspirations to power and identification with some fundamental force of evil or chaos, such as a devil or antichrist figure. The Encyclopedia of Fantasy notes that common features of a dark lord character include being "already defeated but not destroyed aeons before" and engaging in "wounding of the land" or other rituals of desecration.

Japanese media often features an equivalent of this archetype called a "demon king" (魔王, maō), drawing from analogous figures in religion and folklore.

Philip Pullman noted that the dark lord archetype in literature can often reflect the belief that "evil in the real world is usually embodied in a single person and requires a high position to be effective" and that this contrasts with Hannah Arendt's notion of the banality of evil.

== Notable examples ==
- Alberich of Richard Wagner's Ring cycle, a prototypical dark lord
- Count Dracula of Bram Stoker's novel and later franchises
- Sauron and Morgoth of J. R. R. Tolkien's The Lord of the Rings and The Silmarillion, respectively
- Darkseid of the New Gods in DC Comics, originally appearing in Jack Kirby's Fourth World metaseries
- Darth Vader and Emperor Palpatine of the Star Wars series
- Skeletor from the Masters of the Universe franchise
- The Skeksis from The Dark Crystal are portrayed as evil overlords
- Ganondorf from The Legend of Zelda series
- The Dark Lord from Flint the Time Detective
- The Crimson King of Stephen King's The Dark Tower series
- Lord Voldemort of J. K. Rowling's Harry Potter series
- Ming the Merciless from Flash Gordon
- Nerona Imu from One Piece

== Evil overlord list ==
In part due to the literary popularity of dark lords in fiction, science fiction and fantasy fans have collected several satirical lists of resolutions for a competent evil overlord to avoid the well-known, cliché blunders committed by dark lords, supervillains, and other archetypal antagonists in popular fiction. For example, one such resolution is: "I will not gloat over my enemies' predicament to show my superiority. I will shoot them." Internet copies of these lists vary in number and order of entries.

The most famous lists, both referred to as the Evil Overlord List, were developed concurrently. Both were published to the Web in the early 1990s. The original, if lesser-known list was compiled in 1990 by members of the now-defunct FidoNet Science Fiction and Fandom (SFFAN) email echo. The FidoNet list originated with a 1988 Saturday Night Live skit featuring Bond villains touting the book What Not to Do When You Capture James Bond. The FidoNet list arose out of discussions regarding what sort of advice might be in that book, and was compiled and published by Jack Butler. It predated the following list, but was only widely published later, and is the more obscure of the two.

The later-produced and more famous version of the list was compiled in 1994 by Peter Anspach (hence it is occasionally titled "Peter's Evil Overlord List") based on informal discussions at conventions and on online bulletin boards in the early 1990s, and has subsequently become one of the best-known parodies of bad SF/F writing, frequently referenced online. It was originally The Top 100 Things I'd Do If I Ever Became an Evil Overlord, but grew to include over 100 entries.

The Evil Overlord List has led to spin-offs, including lists for stock characters including (but not limited to) heroes, henchmen, sidekicks, the Evil Overlord's Accountant, and Starfleet captains.

In Australia, a minor literary scandal erupted in 1997 when it emerged that award-winning author Helen Darville plagiarised the list for her regular column in Brisbane's The Courier-Mail newspaper, which led to her being fired.

Teresa Nielsen Hayden, author and lecturer, uses an expanded version of the list in her lectures on writing science fiction. She recommends selecting five random clichés from the list, and using them, or their reverse ("Say you've drawn A-34, 'I will not turn into a snake. It never helps.' You can have a character turn into a snake and find it doesn't help, or do it and find it very useful indeed") as the basis for a plot.

== See also ==
- Devil – Mythical personification of evil
