= List of Kingdom Hearts media =

Kingdom Hearts
- Genres: Action role-playing; Hack and slash; Rhythm action
- Developers: Square Enix: Square; Jupiter; h.a.n.d.; BitGroove Inc.; Success; indieszero
- Publisher: Square Enix: Square
- Creators: Tetsuya Nomura; Shinji Hashimoto
- Composer: Yoko Shimomura
- Platforms: Various: PlayStation 2; Game Boy Advance; Mobile phone; Nintendo DS; PlayStation Portable; Nintendo 3DS; PlayStation 3; Web browser; PlayStation 4; Xbox One; Android; iOS; Windows; Nintendo Switch; Nintendo Switch 2; PlayStation 5; Xbox Series X/S
- First release: Kingdom Hearts; March 28, 2002
- Latest release: Kingdom Hearts: Melody of Memory; November 11, 2020
- Parent series: Final Fantasy

Kingdom Hearts is a series of action role-playing games developed and published by Square Enix (formerly Square). It is the result of a collaboration between Square Enix and Disney Interactive Studios, combining characters and elements from Square Enix's Final Fantasy series and multiple Disney franchises. Currently the series includes seven video games released on various platforms, a manga series, a novel series, video game soundtracks released on audio CDs, and a collectible card game.

The video games provide the canonical story of the series. The manga series is adapted by Shiro Amano and the novels are written by Tomoco Kanemaki and illustrated by Shiro Amano. The stories follow the events that take place in the video games with differences to account for the loss of interactivity that a video game provides. The manga and novel series are both divided up into three series based on each of the three main video games. Each series is further broken up into multiple volumes. The manga was originally serialized in Japan by Square's Monthly Shonen Gangan, but has since been released worldwide. The manga was released in the United States by Tokyopop near the end of 2005, but was discontinued in 2008.

== Games ==
=== Video games ===
Each game in the series has been critically and commercially successful, though each title has seen different levels of success. As of December 2006, the Kingdom Hearts series has shipped over 10 million copies worldwide, with 2.0 million copies in PAL regions, 3.0 million copies in Japan, and 5.6 million copies in North America. The main games in the series were released in chronological order, with each new game following the events of the previous. The exception is the V CAST mobile game, which was developed independently of Square Enix's games. Three new titles in the series were announced at the 2007 Tokyo Game Show. Coded and Mobile were only released for Japan. Kingdom Hearts: Melody of Memory is the latest game of the series, having been released worldwide in November 2020.

Title	Original release date		
Title	Japan	North America	PAL region
Kingdom Hearts	March 28, 2002	September 17, 2002	November 15, 2002
Notes: Released on the PlayStation 2; Developed by Square Enix; North American and PAL release featured additional content that was not in the original Japanese version.; An international version was released exclusively in Japan as Kingdom Hearts Final Mix on December 26, 2002. Final Mix includes the content from the North America/PAL version with additional enemies, cutscenes, and weapons. Various additions foreshadowed later plot developments in the series.
Kingdom Hearts: Chain of Memories	November 11, 2004	December 7, 2004	May 6, 2005
Notes: Released on the Game Boy Advance; Developed by Square Enix and Jupiter; Features two player battles via Game Link Cable; Remade into a PlayStation 2 game with 3D graphics and additional features titled Kingdom Hearts Re:Chain of Memories. It was released in Japan as a package with Kingdom Hearts II Final Mix on March 29, 2007. It was released in North America as a standalone title on December 2, 2008. It was released in Europe as part of Kingdom Hearts HD 1.5 Remix on September 13, 2013.
Kingdom Hearts II	December 22, 2005	March 28, 2006	September 29, 2006
Notes: Released on the PlayStation 2; Developed by Square Enix; A special edition box set containing Kingdom Hearts, Kingdom Hearts: Chain of Memories, and Kingdom Hearts II was released concurrently in Japan. The set is titled Kingdom Hearts: Trinity Master Pieces.; An international version was released as Kingdom Hearts II Final Mix, which contains bonus content, such as additional cutscenes and bosses, along with Kingdom Hearts Re:Chain of Memories. This collection is titled Kingdom Hearts II Final Mix+ and was released in Japan on March 29, 2007. Those who pre-ordered the collection also received Kingdom Hearts -Another Report-, a book which includes plot and development information, as well as the "Director's Secret Report XIII".
Kingdom Hearts Coded	November 18, 2008	January 11, 2011 (Nintendo DS)	January 14, 2011 (Nintendo DS)
Notes: Released on mobile phones; Collaboration between Square Enix and the Walt Disney Internet Group; Released in several Episodes over time; Kingdom Hearts Re:coded, an enhanced remake for the Nintendo DS, was released in Japan October 7, 2010 and was released January 11 and 14, 2011, in North America and Europe, respectively.
Kingdom Hearts Mobile	December 15, 2008	—	—
Notes: Released on NTT docomo cell phone; Developed by Square Enix; A Kingdom Hearts themed online community-based social gaming networking service featuring player avatars and mini-games
Kingdom Hearts 358/2 Days	May 30, 2009	September 29, 2009	October 9, 2009
Notes: Released on the Nintendo DS; Developed by Square Enix and h.a.n.d.; It was then made into a remastered movie in 2013 with the release of Kingdom Hearts HD 1.5 Remix.
Kingdom Hearts Birth by Sleep	January 9, 2010	September 7, 2010	September 10, 2010
Notes: Released on the PlayStation Portable; Developed by Square Enix; Kingdom Hearts Birth by Sleep Final Mix was released in Japan on January 20, 2011.
Kingdom Hearts 3D: Dream Drop Distance	March 29, 2012	July 31, 2012	July 20, 2012
Notes: Released on the Nintendo 3DS; Developed by Square Enix
Kingdom Hearts HD 1.5 Remix	March 14, 2013	September 10, 2013	September 13, 2013
Notes: Released on the PlayStation 3; Developed by Square Enix; HD remakes of Kingdom Hearts Final Mix and Re:Chain of Memories and HD remastered cinematic scenes from Kingdom Hearts 358/2 Days.; First time Kingdom Hearts Final Mix is released outside of Japan and Re:Chain of Memories is released in Europe; Ported to the PlayStation 4 as part of Kingdom Hearts HD 1.5 + 2.5 Remix in March 2017.
Kingdom Hearts χ	July 18, 2013	April 7, 2016	June 16, 2016
Notes: Initially released via Web browser; Developed by Square Enix; Kingdom Hearts Unchained χ was released in Japan on September 3, 2015 for Android and iOS devices.
Kingdom Hearts HD 2.5 Remix	October 2, 2014	December 2, 2014	December 5, 2014
Notes: Released on the PlayStation 3; Developed by Square Enix; HD remakes of Kingdom Hearts II Final Mix and Birth By Sleep Final Mix and HD remastered cinematic scenes from Kingdom Hearts Re:coded.; First time Kingdom Hearts II Final Mix and Birth By Sleep Final Mix are released outside of Japan; Ported to the PlayStation 4 as part of Kingdom Hearts HD 1.5 + 2.5 Remix in March 2017.
Kingdom Hearts HD 2.8 Final Chapter Prologue	January 12, 2017	January 24, 2017	January 24, 2017
Notes: Released on the PlayStation 4; Developed by Square Enix; HD remake of Kingdom Hearts 3D: Dream Drop Distance; Includes Kingdom Hearts 0.2 Birth By Sleep: A Fragmentary Passage and a one-hour movie companion to Kingdom Hearts χ, Kingdom Hearts χ Back Cover.
Kingdom Hearts III	January 25, 2019	January 29, 2019	January 29, 2019
Notes: Released on the PlayStation 4 and Xbox One; Developed by Square Enix; First multiplatform release, as well as the first for a Microsoft console; A DLC titled Kingdom Hearts III Re Mind was released for the PlayStation 4 and Xbox One on January 23, 2020 and February 25, 2020, respectively; A version of the game bundled with the DLC and titled Kingdom Hearts III + Re Mind was released on Windows on March 30, 2021 and on the Nintendo Switch on February 10, 2022.
Kingdom Hearts Dark Road	June 22, 2020	June 22, 2020	June 22, 2020
Notes: Released for iOS and Android devices; Developed by Square Enix
Kingdom Hearts: Melody of Memory	November 11, 2020	November 13, 2020	November 13, 2020
Notes: Released on the Nintendo Switch, PlayStation 4 and Xbox One; Developed by Square Enix and indieszero; Ported to Windows on March 30, 2021; Rhythm action game that retells the events of the series.

=== Collectible card game ===
The Kingdom Hearts Trading Card Game is a collectible card game based on the Kingdom Hearts series. It was first released in Japan to coincide with the release of Chain of Memories and was produced by Tomy. The TCG features starter decks, playing mats, and booster packs. In 2007, Fantasy Flight Games acquired the rights to translate the game and market it in North America. In the game, the player takes the role of Sora from the Kingdom Hearts games. Using the cards, players travel to worlds to battle the Heartless. The game allows for two players with a deck and "Player Card" to play together. The game is distributed in a variety of booster packs. The game was released in North America on November 15, 2007.

== Soundtracks ==
The music of the video game series Kingdom Hearts was composed by Yoko Shimomura with orchestral music arranged by Kaoru Wada. The original soundtracks of each game have been released on two albums and a third compilation album. The games feature two main theme songs, which were written and performed by Hikaru Utada, as well as music from Disney films.

Title	Original release date		
Title	Japan	North America	PAL region
Kingdom Hearts Original Soundtrack	March 27, 2002	March 23, 2003	November 25, 2002
Notes: Two CD set (2:40:16); Released in Japan (Toshiba-EMI), United States (Walt Disney Records), and Europe (Virgin Records)
Kingdom Hearts -Final Mix- Additional Tracks	December 26, 2002	—	—
Notes: One CD (0:14:34) containing four new tracks from Kingdom Hearts Final Mix; Released only in Japan by Walt Disney Records
Kingdom Hearts II Original Soundtrack	January 25, 2006	—	—
Notes: Two CD set (2:28:47); Released only in Japan by Toshiba EMI
Kingdom Hearts Original Soundtrack Complete	March 28, 2007	—	—
Notes: Nine CD set (8:51:33); Contains music from all three games, as well as previously unreleased music; Released only in Japan by Toshiba EMI; Includes a deluxe booklet containing new illustrations by Tetsuya Nomura and comments from Yoko Shimomura
Piano Collections Kingdom Hearts	May 27, 2009	—	—
Notes: One CD (44:37); Contains arranged music from all three games as chosen by members of Square Enix's music website.; Released only in Japan by Square Enix
Piano Collections Kingdom Hearts Field & Battle	January 13, 2010	—	—
Notes: One CD (37:46); Second compilation album of compositions from the Kingdom Hearts series arranged for solo piano by Sachiko Miyano and Natsumi Kameoka; Released only in Japan by Square Enix.
Kingdom Hearts Birth by Sleep & 358/2 Days Original Soundtrack	February 2, 2011	—	—
Notes: Three CDs set (3:51:54); Album containing music from the games Kingdom Hearts Birth by Sleep and Kingdom Hearts 358/2 Days, as well as Kingdom Hearts Re:coded, composed by Yoko Shimomura.; Released only in Japan by Square Enix.
Kingdom Hearts Dream Drop Distance Original Soundtrack	April 18, 2012	—	—
Notes: Three CDs set (3:20:18); Album containing music from the game Kingdom Hearts 3D: Dream Drop Distance composed by Yoko Shimomura, Takeharu Ishimoto and Tsuyoshi Sekito.; Released only in Japan by Square Enix.

== Printed media ==
In addition to video games, the Kingdom Hearts franchise includes printed media.

=== Manga ===
The plot of the manga, drawn by Shiro Amano, stays true to the events in the video games, though it does diverge at certain points. Certain fights were shortened or excluded and some minor characters and worlds visited in the game were also excluded. The first series was re-released in three volumes in Japan in December 2006 as "Kingdom Hearts: Final Mix". The manga series has been well received. Several of the manga volumes were listed on USA Today's "Top 150 best sellers". The highest ranked volume was Kingdom Hearts volume 4 at #73. Every volume listed stayed on the list for at least two weeks; Kingdom Hearts volume 4 stayed the longest at four weeks. However, due to Tokyopop's 2008 restructuring, the Kingdom Hearts manga series was cancelled after the 2nd volume of Kingdom Hearts II's manga was released.

==== Kingdom Hearts ====
Title	Original release date		
Title	Japan	North America	PAL region
Volume 1	October 25, 2003	October 11, 2005	—
Notes: Published by Enterbrain (JP), Tokyopop (US), and Madman Entertainment (AUS, NZ); Thirteen chapters which follow the storyline of the first game, Kingdom Hearts; Includes a special section, "Shiro Amano Character Sketches"; (JP) ISBN 4-7577-1657-5; (US) ISBN 1-59816-217-9
Volume 2	April 24, 2004	January 10, 2006	—
Notes: Published by Enterbrain (JP), Tokyopop (US), and Madman Entertainment (AUS, NZ); Twelve chapters which follow the storyline of the first game, Kingdom Hearts; Includes an extra section, "Kingdom Bites"; (JP) ISBN 4-7577-1845-4; (US) ISBN 1-59816-218-7
Volume 3	November 24, 2004	April 11, 2006	—
Notes: Published by Enterbrain (JP), Tokyopop (US), and Madman Entertainment (AUS, NZ); Nine chapters which follow the storyline of the first game, Kingdom Hearts; Includes an extra section, "Kingdom Bites"; (JP) ISBN 4-7577-2072-6; (US) ISBN 1-59816-219-5
Volume 4	January 31, 2005	July 11, 2006	—
Notes: Published by Enterbrain (JP), Tokyopop (US) and Madman Entertainment (AUS, NZ); Seven chapters which follow the storyline of the first game, Kingdom Hearts; Includes a special chapter, "Winnie the Pooh"; (JP) ISBN 4-7577-2187-0; (US) ISBN 1-59816-220-9
Boxed Set	—	October 10, 2006	—
Notes: Published by Tokyopop (US); Contains all four volumes of the Kingdom Hearts manga; (US) ISBN 1-59816-808-8

==== Kingdom Hearts: Chain of Memories ====
Title	Original release date		
Title	Japan	North America	PAL region
Volume 1	October 22, 2005	October 10, 2006	—
Notes: Published by Square Enix (JP) and Tokyopop (US); Six chapters which follow the storyline of the second game, Kingdom Hearts: Chain of Memories; Includes a bonus section, "Transform Sora"; (JP) ISBN 4-7575-1552-9; (US) ISBN 1-59116-359-5
Volume 2	April 22, 2006	February 13, 2007	—
Notes: Published by Square Enix (JP) and Tokyopop (US); Seven chapters which follow the storyline of the second game, Kingdom Hearts: Chain of Memories; Includes a special chapter, "Strange News of Riku—Strange Story of the Replica"; (JP) ISBN 4-7575-1670-3; (US) ISBN 1-59116-739-6
Boxed Set	—	October 9, 2007	—
Notes: Published by Tokyopop (US); Contains both volumes of the Kingdom Hearts: Chain of Memories manga; (US) ISBN 1-4278-0629-2

==== Kingdom Hearts II ====
Title	Original release date		
Title	Japan	North America	PAL region
Volume 1	December 22, 2006	July 3, 2007	—
Notes: Published by Square Enix (JP) and Tokyopop (US); Seven chapters which follow the storyline of the third game, Kingdom Hearts II; (JP) ISBN 4-7575-1832-3; (US) ISBN 978-1-4278-0058-9
Volume 2	August 22, 2007	May 9, 2008	—
Notes: Published by Square Enix (JP) and Tokyopop (US); Six chapters which follow the storyline of the third game, Kingdom Hearts II; (JP) ISBN 4-7575-2084-0; (US) ISBN 1-4278-0059-6
Volume 3	April 22, 2008		—
Notes: Published by Square Enix (JP); Eight chapters which follow the storyline of the third game, Kingdom Hearts II; (JP) ISBN 4-7575-2084-0; (US) ISBN 978-1-4278-0060-2
Volume 4	November 22, 2008	—	—
Notes: Published by Square Enix (JP); Eight chapters which follow the storyline of the third game, Kingdom Hearts II; (JP) ISBN 978-4-7575-2426-2
Volume 5	August 22, 2009	—	—
Notes: Published by Square Enix (JP); Eight chapters which follow the storyline of the third game, Kingdom Hearts II; (JP) ISBN 978-4-7575-2607-5
Volume 6	May 22, 2013	—	—
Notes: Published by Square Enix (JP); Eight chapters which follow the storyline of the third game, Kingdom Hearts II; (JP) ISBN 978-4-7575-3938-9
Volume 7	November 22, 2013	—	—
Notes: Published by Square Enix (JP); Eight chapters which follow the storyline of the third game, Kingdom Hearts II; (JP) ISBN 978-4-7575-4086-6
Volume 8	July 22, 2014	—	—
Notes: Published by Square Enix (JP); Eight chapters which follow the storyline of the third game, Kingdom Hearts II; (JP) ISBN 978-4-7575-4305-8
Volume 9	February 22, 2015	—	—
Notes: Published by Square Enix (JP); Eight chapters which follow the storyline of the third game, Kingdom Hearts II; (JP) ISBN 978-4-7575-4533-5
Volume 10	August 22, 2015	—	—
Notes: Published by Square Enix (JP); Eight chapters which follow the storyline of the third game, Kingdom Hearts II

==== Kingdom Hearts Final Mix ====
Title	Original release date		
Title	Japan	North America	PAL region
キングダムハーツFINAL MIX 1	December 22, 2006	May 28, 2013	—
Notes: Published by Square Enix (JP); Follows the storyline of the first game's international version, Kingdom Hearts Final Mix; (JP) ISBN 978-4-7575-1833-9; (US) ISBN 978-0-316-25420-5
キングダムハーツFINAL MIX 2	January 22, 2007	May 28, 2013	—
Notes: Published by Square Enix (JP); Follows the storyline of the first game's international version, Kingdom Hearts Final Mix; (JP) ISBN 978-4-7575-1923-7; (US) ISBN 978-0-316-25421-2
キングダムハーツFINAL MIX 3	March 22, 2007	—	—
Notes: Published by Square Enix (JP); Follows the storyline of the first game's international version, Kingdom Hearts Final Mix; (JP) ISBN 978-4-7575-1947-3

==== Kingdom Hearts 358/2 Days ====
No.	Original release date	Original ISBN	English release date	English ISBN
1	June 22, 2010	9784757529021	November 19, 2013	978-0-316-40118-0
2	March 22, 2011	9784757531673	January 21, 2014	978-0-316-40119-7
3	October 22, 2011	9784757533882	March 25, 2014	978-0-316-40120-3
4	April 22, 2012	9784757535213	October 28, 2014	978-0-316-28676-3
5	September 22, 2012	9784757536913	January 20, 2015	978-0-316-33626-0

=== Novels ===
A novel series has also been released in Japan. It is written by Tomoko Kanemaki (金巻ともこ, Kanemaki Tomoko) and illustrated by Shiro Amano. Like the manga series, it is divided up into separate series based on the games. Yen Press began releasing the novels in English-language omnibus editions in 2015.

==== Kingdom Hearts ====
Title	Original release date		
Title	Japan	North America	PAL region
The First Door	June 30, 2005	March 24, 2015	October 29, 2014
Notes: Published by Square Enix (JP), Yen Press (EN), and Pika Édition (FR); Follows the storyline of the first game, Kingdom Hearts; (JP) ISBN 4-7575-1468-9; (US) ISBN 978-0-3162-6019-0
Darkness Within	July 29, 2005	March 24, 2015	October 29, 2014
Notes: Published by Square Enix (JP), Yen Press (EN), ki and Pika Édition (FR); Follows the storyline of the first game, Kingdom Hearts; (JP) ISBN 4-7575-1495-6; (US) ISBN 978-0-3162-6019-0

==== Kingdom Hearts: Chain of Memories ====
Title	Original release date		
Title	Japan	North America	PAL region
《ソラ編》上	October 22, 2005	September 22, 2015	—
Notes: Published by Square Enix (JP), Yen Press (EN); Follows the storyline of the second game, Kingdom Hearts Chain of Memories; (JP) ISBN 4-7575-1568-5; (EN) ISBN 978-0-3162-6173-9
《ソラ編》下	November 30, 2005	September 22, 2015	—
Notes: Published by Square Enix (JP), Yen Press (EN); Follows the storyline of the second game, Kingdom Hearts Chain of Memories; (JP) ISBN 4-7575-1581-2; (EN) ISBN 978-0-3162-6173-9
Reverse/Rebirth	January 31, 2006	September 22, 2015	—
Notes: Published by Square Enix (JP), Yen Press (EN); Follows the storyline of the second game, Kingdom Hearts Chain of Memories; (JP) ISBN 4-7575-1618-5; (EN) ISBN 978-0-3162-6173-9

==== Kingdom Hearts II ====
Title	Original release date		
Title	Japan	North America	PAL region
Roxas—Seven days	April 22, 2006	June 20, 2017	—
Notes: Published by Square Enix (JP), Yen Press (EN); Follows the storyline of the third game, Kingdom Hearts II; (JP) ISBN 4-7575-1679-7; (EN) ISBN 978-0-3164-7193-0
The Destruction of Hollow Bastion	July 16, 2006	June 20, 2017	—
Notes: Published by Square Enix (JP), Yen Press (EN); Follows the storyline of the third game, Kingdom Hearts II; (JP) ISBN 4-7575-1715-7; (EN) ISBN 978-0-3164-7193-0
Tears of Nobody	September 29, 2006	December 19, 2017	—
Notes: Published by Square Enix (JP), Yen Press (EN); Follows the storyline of the third game, Kingdom Hearts II; (JP) ISBN 4-7575-1792-0; (EN) ISBN 978-0-3164-1179-0
Anthem—Meet Again/Axel Last Stand	February 27, 2007	December 19, 2017	—
Notes: Published by Square Enix (JP), Yen Press (EN); Follows the storyline of the third game, Kingdom Hearts II; (JP) ISBN 4-7575-1964-8; (EN) ISBN 978-0-3164-1179-0

==== Kingdom Hearts 358/2 Days ====
No.	Title	Original release date	English release date
1	The 14th	July 30, 2009; 9784757526044	June 26, 2018; 9781975327491
2	Go to the Sea	January 28, 2010; 9784757527744	June 26, 2018; 9781975327491
3	Xion-Seven Days	May 28, 2010; 9784757528888	June 26, 2018; 9781975327491

==== Kingdom Hearts Birth by Sleep ====
No.	Title	Original release date	English release date
1	Something Strange	December 24, 2010; 9784757531116	-
2	Best Friends	February 24, 2011; 9784757531543	-
3	To the Future	May 26, 2011; 9784757532212	-

==== Kingdom Hearts 3D: Dream Drop Distance ====
No.	Title	Original release date	English release date
1	Side Sora	June 28, 2012; 978-4-7575-3652-4	-
2	Side Riku	September 27, 2012; 978-4-7575-3751-4	-

=== Companion books ===
There have been numerous books that provide walkthroughs and supplemental information to the video games. Square Enix has released six Ultimania guides and one bonus book on the Kingdom Hearts series exclusively in Japan. The Ultimania guides primarily serve as strategy guides for their respective games, revealing secrets from the developers' perspective. They also contain interviews with the staff, extended information on backstory, and original artwork. In North America, BradyGames has been given exclusive rights to publish strategy guides for the games.

Title	Original release date		
Title	Japan	North America	PAL region
Kingdom Hearts Ultimania	June 13, 2002	—	—
Notes: Published by Square Enix (JP); A guide for the first game, Kingdom Hearts; (JP) ISBN 4-88787-042-6
Kingdom Hearts Official Strategy Guide	—	September 11, 2002	—
Notes: Published by Brady Games (NA); Features a comprehensive walkthrough and a sticker activity journal; (NA) ISBN 0-7440-0198-6
Kingdom Hearts: Chain of Memories Official Strategy Guide	—	December 3, 2004	—
Notes: Published by Brady Games (NA); Features a comprehensive walkthrough; (NA) ISBN 0-7440-0473-X
Kingdom Hearts Ultimania Revised Edition	December 17, 2004	—	—
Notes: Published by Square Enix (JP); A guide for the first game, Kingdom Hearts with new information on the "Final Mix" edition of the game; (JP) ISBN 4-7575-1349-6
Kingdom Hearts: Chain of Memories Ultimania	December 17, 2004	—	—
Notes: Published by Square Enix (JP); A guide for the second game, Kingdom Hearts: Chain of Memories; (JP) ISBN 4-7575-1344-5
Kingdom Hearts Series Ultimania α ~Introduction of Kingdom Hearts II~	December 9, 2005	—	—
Notes: Published by Square Enix (JP); Provides a walkthrough and review of the events of the first two games; Provides information on the new characters and locations in Kingdom Hearts II; (JP) ISBN 4-7575-1597-9
Kingdom Hearts II Ultimania	February 23, 2006	—	—
Notes: Published by Square Enix (JP); A guide for the third game, Kingdom Hearts II; (JP) ISBN 4-7575-1621-5
Kingdom Hearts II Limited Edition Strategy Guide	—	March 23, 2006	—
Notes: Published by BradyGames (NA); Features a comprehensive walkthrough and includes a copy of Jiminy's Journal along with 400 stickers; Available in four different covers; (NA) ISBN 0-7440-0624-4
Kingdom Hearts II Official Strategy Guide	—	March 27, 2006	—
Notes: Published by BradyGames (NA); Features a comprehensive walkthrough and a foldout poster; (NA) ISBN 0-7440-0526-4
Kingdom Hearts -Another Report-	March 29, 2007	—	—
Notes: Published by Square Enix (JP); Available only to those who pre-ordered Kingdom Hearts II Final Mix+; Contains "Director's Secret Report XIII"
Kingdom Hearts II Final Mix+ Ultimania	May 2, 2007	—	—
Notes: Published by Square Enix (JP); A guide for the collection that contains Kingdom Hearts II Final Mix and Kingdom Hearts Re:Chain of Memories, Kingdom Hearts II Final Mix+; (JP) ISBN 4-7575-2013-1
Kingdom Hearts Birth by Sleep Ultimania	March 25, 2010	—	—
Notes: Published by Square Enix (JP); A guide for Kingdom Hearts Birth by Sleep; (JP) I9784757527881
Kingdom Hearts Birth by Sleep: Signature Series Guide	—	August 31, 2010	—
Notes: Published by BradyGames (NA); A guide for Kingdom Hearts Birth by Sleep.; (NA) ISBN 0744012392
Kingdom Hearts 3D: Dream Drop Distance Ultimania	May 28, 2012	—	—
Notes: Published by Square Enix; (JP) ISBN 9784757536159
Kingdom Hearts 3D: Dream Drop Distance Signature Series Guide	—	July 31, 2012	—
Notes: Published by BradyGames (NA); A guide for Kingdom Hearts 3D: Dream Drop Distance.; (NA) ISBN 0744014026
