= Kingdom Hearts =

Video game franchise

- The series' logo used from Kingdom Hearts until Melody of Memory
- Created by: Tetsuya Nomura; Shinji Hashimoto
- Original work: Kingdom Hearts (2002)
- Owner: The Walt Disney Company
- Years: 2002-present

Print publications
- Books: See List of Kingdom Hearts media § Companion books
- Novels: See List of Kingdom Hearts media § Novels
- Comics: See List of Kingdom Hearts media § Manga

Films and television
- Television series: Kingdom Hearts: The Series

Games
- Traditional: Kingdom Hearts Trading Card Game
- Video games: See List of Kingdom Hearts media § Video games

Audio
- Original music: See Music of Kingdom Hearts

Official website
- North American website

Kingdom Hearts (Note: Japanese: キングダム ハーツ, Hepburn: Kingudamu Hātsu) is a Japanese video game series and media franchise developed and published by Square Enix (formerly Square) and owned by The Walt Disney Company. A collaboration between the two companies, Kingdom Hearts is a crossover of various Disney properties and original characters based within an original fictional universe, also featuring appearances by characters from Square Enix properties such as Final Fantasy and The World Ends with You. Noted for its intricate lore and complex narrative, the series features a large ensemble cast of characters and includes several story arcs. The series' main plot centers on Sora, a boy who wields a Keyblade, as he journeys across various worlds to protect his friends and thwart the schemes of numerous villains. Longtime Square designer Tetsuya Nomura has served as the series' director and creative lead since its beginning.

The series consists of thirteen games available for multiple platforms, with the first eleven games collectively comprising the "Dark Seeker Saga", and future games are planned. Most of the games in the series have been positively received and commercially successful. As of August 2026, the Kingdom Hearts franchise has grossed over $1 billion and shipped more than 39 million games worldwide. A wide variety of related merchandise has been released along with the games, including a manga series, light novels, soundtracks, action figures, companion books and a collectible card game.

== Media ==
=== Games ===
Release timeline Main series in bold
2002	**Kingdom Hearts**
2003
2004	**Chain of Memories**
2005	**Kingdom Hearts II**
2006
2007	Re:Chain of Memories
2008	**Coded**
2008	Mobile
2009	**358/2 Days**
2010	**Birth by Sleep**
2010	Re:coded
2011
2012	**Dream Drop Distance**
2013	1.5 Remix
2013	**χ**
2014	2.5 Remix
2015	(Unchained / Union) χ
2016
2017	2.8 Final Chapter Prologue
2018
2019	**Kingdom Hearts III**
2020	**Dark Road**
2020	**Melody of Memory**
2021–2026
2027	**Kingdom Hearts IV**

- **Kingdom Hearts** is the first game in the series, released in 2002 for the PlayStation 2. Kingdom Hearts introduces the main characters of the series, and establishes the plot's framework involving hearts and dark beings known as the Heartless, as well as the supporting roles of Disney and Final Fantasy characters in the series. An expanded re-release of the game featuring new and additional content, **Kingdom Hearts Final Mix**, was released exclusively in Japan later in 2002. Final Mix was later released globally as part of the Kingdom Hearts HD 1.5 Remix collection.
- **Kingdom Hearts: Chain of Memories** is a direct sequel to the first game, released for the Game Boy Advance in 2004. Touted as a bridge between the two PlayStation 2 games, Chain of Memories introduces characters and plot points that would be further explored in Kingdom Hearts II. The gameplay is a departure from the original game, employing a real-time card-based battle system. Chain of Memories received a full 3D remake for the PlayStation 2 titled **Kingdom Hearts Re:Chain of Memories**, released in Japan in 2007 and North America in 2008. Re:Chain of Memories later received an HD port as part of the Kingdom Hearts HD 1.5 Remix collection.
- **Kingdom Hearts II** takes place one year after the events of Chain of Memories. It was released for the PlayStation 2 in Japan in 2005 and globally in 2006. The game further explores the "heart" concept by involving a new group of enemies, the Nobodies. The gameplay is similar to that of the first Kingdom Hearts game. Like the first game, Kingdom Hearts II received an expanded re-release titled **Kingdom Hearts II Final Mix**, containing new and additional content. Kingdom Hearts II Final Mix was originally released exclusively in Japan in 2007, and was later released globally as part of the Kingdom Hearts 2.5 HD Remix collection.
- **Kingdom Hearts Coded** is an episodic mobile phone game that picks up directly after Kingdom Hearts II. The "preinstall" episode was released in Japan in 2008, with an additional eight episodes released between 2009 and 2010. The game was remade as **Kingdom Hearts Re:coded** for the Nintendo DS, released in Japan in 2010 and globally in 2011, featuring updated gameplay.
- **Kingdom Hearts 358/2 Days** was released for the Nintendo DS in 2009. It is primarily set between Kingdom Hearts and Kingdom Hearts II, focusing on Roxas' time in Organization XIII and leading directly into the beginning of Kingdom Hearts II. It is the first game in the series to feature a protagonist other than Sora, as well as the first in the series to feature cooperative multiplayer. Gameplay is mission-based, and features a unique panel system which governs character improvement, special abilities and equipped weapons.
- **Kingdom Hearts Birth by Sleep** was released for the PlayStation Portable in 2010. A prequel to the series, the game is set ten years before the events of the first Kingdom Hearts game, revealing the origins of the villain Xehanort. The game features three new protagonists, Terra, Ventus, and Aqua, and consists of four separate scenarios, introducing a new Command Deck system to the game's combat. The game received an expanded re-release, **Kingdom Hearts Birth by Sleep Final Mix**, released exclusively in Japan in 2011. The Final Mix version of the game was later released globally as part of the Kingdom Hearts 2.5 HD Remix collection.
- **Kingdom Hearts 3D: Dream Drop Distance** was released for the Nintendo 3DS in 2012. The game focuses on Sora and Riku's Mark of Mastery exam in anticipation of Xehanort's return. Inheriting similar gameplay systems from Birth by Sleep, the game also features "Dream Eater" companions which can be trained to assist the player in battle. The game later received an HD console port, released as part of the Kingdom Hearts HD 2.8 Final Chapter Prologue collection.
- **Kingdom Hearts χ**, previously known as Kingdom Hearts for PC Browsers, was a browser game exclusively playable in Japan from July 2013 to September 2016. It featured cartoon-like 2D models and served as a prequel to the series, taking place thousands of years before the first Kingdom Hearts and detailing events leading up to the Keyblade War.
  - **Kingdom Hearts: Unchained χ**: An international port of Kingdom Hearts χ titled Kingdom Hearts: Unchained χ was released for Android and iOS devices in Japan in 2015 and globally in 2016. Later in April 2017, it was rebranded as **Kingdom Hearts: Union χ**, featuring an all-new story that expanded and diverged from the original. In January 2019, the game was made available on the Amazon Appstore for Amazon devices. The app was rebranded once again to **Kingdom Hearts: Union χ Dark Road** with the release of Kingdom Hearts Dark Road. The game was shut down and converted into a cutscene viewer in May 2021, and delisted in August 2024.
  - **Kingdom Hearts Dark Road** is a mobile game accessed within Kingdom Hearts Union χ[Cross], which released globally in 2020. The game is set 70 years before Birth by Sleep and explores the origins of Xehanort and his eventual turn to darkness, and was developed by the same team working on Union χ. Following the shutdown of Union χ, Dark Road was converted into an offline game and received its final story update in August 2022.
- **Kingdom Hearts 0.2: Birth by Sleep -A fragmentary passage-** was released as a part of the Kingdom Hearts HD 2.8 Final Chapter Prologue collection for the PlayStation 4 in 2017. Intended as a short, playable prologue for Kingdom Hearts III, the game features Aqua as the protagonist and depicts events both leading into Kingdom Hearts III and intersecting with the ending of the original Kingdom Hearts.
- **Kingdom Hearts III** was released in 2019 for the PlayStation 4 and Xbox One. The game sees a return to the gameplay style seen in the previous two numbered titles, In Kingdom Hearts III, Sora embarks on a journey to regain his lost "Power of Waking" while uniting his allies to face Xehanort and his cohorts in a final battle. The game concludes the "Dark Seeker Saga".
  - **Kingdom Hearts III Re Mind**: A downloadable content (DLC) expansion for Kingdom Hearts III titled Re Mind was released in 2020. The DLC continues the story after the original game's conclusion and teases the future of the franchise.
- **Kingdom Hearts: Melody of Memory** is a rhythm game released in 2020 for the Nintendo Switch, PlayStation 4, and Xbox One. Featuring 140 songs, it features gameplay similar to Theatrhythm Final Fantasy. Melody of Memory continues the story from the end of Kingdom Hearts III.

==== Other games ====
A Kingdom Hearts game was developed for V CAST, Verizon Wireless's broadband service, and was released on February 1, 2005, in the United States. It was one of the launch games for the V CAST services. The game, developed by Superscape and published by Disney Mobile with no involvement from Square Enix, features gameplay akin to the first Kingdom Hearts game, modified for the input method of mobile phones. The game's non-canon storyline features Sora struggling to free himself from a nightmare induced by Maleficent's magic.

Kingdom Hearts Mobile was a Kingdom Hearts-themed social game in which players could play mini-games together. Unlike Kingdom Hearts for the V CAST and Kingdom Hearts Coded, this game does not have a storyline and focuses more on socializing. The service operated in conjunction with Kingdom Hearts Coded, as new avatar costumes became available after the player completed an episode of Kingdom Hearts Coded. Kingdom Hearts-related media such as wallpapers, ringtones, graphics, and other items could be purchased and downloaded through the service for mobile phones.

Kingdom Hearts VR Experience is a 10-minute interactive video released in 2019 "featuring iconic moments [and music] from the Kingdom Hearts games" with the ability to unlock additional content by progressing through the experience.

Sora has made guest appearances in other video games, including World of Final Fantasy, Super Smash Bros. Ultimate and Fortnite.

==== Collections and bundles ====
The series has seen many collections, packages and re-releases throughout its history, centered on three HD collections.

- **Kingdom Hearts HD 1.5 Remix** was originally released for the PlayStation 3 in 2013. The collection includes HD remasters of Kingdom Hearts Final Mix (released outside of Japan for the first time) and Re:Chain of Memories, as well as a 3-hour collection of cutscenes to represent Kingdom Hearts 358/2 Days.
- **Kingdom Hearts HD 2.5 Remix** was originally released for the PlayStation 3 in 2014, and includes HD remasters of Kingdom Hearts II Final Mix and Kingdom Hearts Birth by Sleep Final Mix (both released globally for the first time), as well as a 3-hour cutscene collection representing Kingdom Hearts Re:coded.
- **Kingdom Hearts HD 2.8 Final Chapter Prologue** was originally released for the PlayStation 4 in 2017, featuring an HD console port of Kingdom Hearts 3D: Dream Drop Distance, a new game entitled Kingdom Hearts 0.2: Birth by Sleep -A fragmentary passage- intended as a short playable prologue for Kingdom Hearts III, and Kingdom Hearts χ Back Cover, a one-hour cutscene movie telling the story of Kingdom Hearts χ.

The three collections have been repackaged and re-released together in various combinations for various platforms:

- Kingdom Hearts Starter Pack -HD 1.5 + 2.5 ReMIX- was released for the PlayStation 3 exclusively in Japan in 2014, featuring the first two collections on separate discs.
- Kingdom Hearts HD 1.5 + 2.5 Remix was released globally for the PlayStation 4 in 2017, featuring the first two collections included on a single disc. The compilation also features additional enhancements to the games, including 60 FPS gameplay and faster load times. It was later released for the Xbox One in 2020, for Windows in 2021, and for the Nintendo Switch in 2022.
- Kingdom Hearts: The Story So Far was released for the PlayStation 4 in North America in 2018 and in Europe in 2019, including all three collections with HD 1.5 + 2.5 Remix on one disc and 2.8 Final Chapter Prologue on another.
- Kingdom Hearts: All-In-One-Package was released digitally in North America and Europe in 2019 for the PlayStation 4, and was given a physical release in 2020. This bundle includes The Story So Far in addition to Kingdom Hearts III.
- Kingdom Hearts Integrum Masterpiece was first released via cloud streaming for the Nintendo Switch in 2022, and includes all three collections in addition to Kingdom Hearts III and its Re Mind DLC. A non-cloud version of the game was released on Steam in 2024. The games feature AI-upscaled textures as well as the ability to toggle between English and Japanese voice overs.
- Kingdom Hearts Collection [I~III] is a rebrand of the Integrum Masterpiece collection, released in October 2026. featuring native versions of the games for the PlayStation 5, Xbox Series X/S, Nintendo Switch 2 and Windows via the Microsoft Store.

==== Future games ====
In April 2022, Square Enix announced Kingdom Hearts IV was in development. The game's announcement trailer confirmed that Sora, Donald, and Goofy would return, and that the game would be set in Quadratum, a realistic world inspired by Tokyo. Nomura has stated that Kingdom Hearts IV is intended to be the start of a new saga for the series entitled the "Lost Master" arc. Further trailers for the game were shown during a Nintendo Direct presentation in June 2026 and at the D23 event in August 2026, the latter of which revealed Mickey, Donald, and Goofy as playable characters, as well as a release window of late 2027.

==== Cancelled games ====
A mobile game titled Kingdom Hearts: Fragmented Keys was briefly worked on in 2013, but was ultimately cancelled before being announced. Concept art for the game was later discovered in 2015, revealing it would have featured Game Central Station from Wreck-It Ralph as the central hub, through which the player would access both new and returning worlds based on films such as Aladdin, Frozen, and Star Wars.

In April 2022, Square Enix revealed that a new mobile game for iOS and Android devices titled Kingdom Hearts Missing-Link was in development, with its story set in the Scala ad Caelum world between the events of Union X and Dark Road. A closed beta was originally set for late 2022. However, the iOS beta testing, which consisted of around 1,500 players from Australia and the United Kingdom, was delayed to the end of 2023. The Android beta testing was also delayed from its original January 2024 date until later in spring of that year. The delay was to allow the developers time to make the game compatible with a wider range of Android devices. The game was expected to launch on mobile devices at an undetermined date. On May 14, 2025, Square Enix announced that the game had been cancelled. The game's opening cinematic was leaked in July 2026.

=== Printed adaptations ===
A manga based on Kingdom Hearts was released in Japan and the United States. The story and art were done by Shiro Amano, who is known for his manga adaptation of the Legend of Mana series. The story follows the events that took place in the video games with differences to account for the loss of interactivity a video game provides. The manga was originally serialized in Japan by Square Enix's Monthly Shōnen Gangan, and the first tankōbon was released in Japan in October 2003. The manga was released in the US by Tokyopop two years later in October 2005. Yen Press now holds the rights to publish the books for the USA market. The first series, Kingdom Hearts, consists of four volumes, while the second series, Kingdom Hearts: Chain of Memories, has two volumes. The third series, Kingdom Hearts II, consists of ten volumes. A fourth series based on Kingdom Hearts 358/2 Days was released in five volumes while Kingdom Hearts II was in progress. As of April 2019, a fifth series based on Kingdom Hearts III has been serialized monthly in Gangan Online with Amano returning to do story and artwork. Yen Press also licensed the series and published it online in English on apps such as Comixology and BookWalker alongside the Japanese release. This series will soon have two volumes published in tankōbon format.

The games have also been adapted as a light novel series, written by Tomoco Kanemaki and illustrated by Shiro Amano. Like the manga series, it is divided into separate series based on the individual games. Kingdom Hearts is divided into two volumes; "The First Door" and "Darkness Within". Kingdom Hearts: Chain of Memories is divided into two volumes. Kingdom Hearts II is divided into four volumes; "Roxas—Seven Days", "The Destruction of Hollow Bastion", "Tears of Nobody", and "Anthem—Meet Again/Axel Last Stand".

=== Television ===
Following the release of the first game in 2002, Walt Disney Television Animation hired Seth Kearsley to develop and direct a television pilot animatic for a potential Disney Channel animated series adaption of the game. The series would have covered much of the plot of the first game, with the animatic set in Agrabah, the world based on the film Aladdin (1992). The animatic featured the same voice actors from the game, except for Sora's voice actor Haley Joel Osment, who was unable to work on the pilot because of a scheduling conflict; he was replaced by Bobby Edner. Despite the pilot testing "exceptionally well", Square Enix decided not to move forward with the television series in order to not conflict with future games in the franchise.

In May 2020, it was reported that a CGI-animated Kingdom Hearts television series was being created for Disney's streaming service, Disney+. Disney had planned to produce the series, before production was shifted to Square Enix, who were tasked with creating a pilot episode with Unreal Engine, the game engine used to create the modern games in the series. In April 2024, Skyler Shuler of The DisInsider reported that Disney had shifted their plans for the franchise to try and develop a feature film instead of a television series. At D23 2026, Disney announced that an anime series based on the franchise was in development, and would be released on both Disney Channel and Disney+.

== Concept and design ==
Nomura intended hearts and the strengths and connections of the heart to be a common theme in the games. Characters within the Kingdom Hearts series are composed of three parts: body, soul, and heart. The body acts as a vessel for the heart and soul, with the soul giving life to the body. The heart holds their memories and gives them emotion, light, and darkness.

The Kingdom Hearts games are divided into various game levels, referred to as "worlds", which the player progresses through. Worlds vary in appearance, typically dependent on the Disney setting on which they are based. The worlds' graphics resemble the art style from the originating Disney film, and the worlds are inhabited by characters from their respective films; for example, Hercules and Philoctetes appear in Olympus Coliseum from Hercules, while Aladdin, Princess Jasmine, and the Genie appear in Agrabah from Aladdin. The game worlds consist of interconnected field maps where battles and plot-related events occur. Players travel between worlds in different ways in each game, such as the "Gummi Ship" in the original Kingdom Hearts, "Keyblade glider" in Kingdom Hearts Birth by Sleep, "Corridors of Darkness" in 358/2 Days, and "Sleeping Keyholes" in Dream Drop Distance. Worlds created specifically for the series mirror the overall appearance of other worlds and predominantly feature characters from Square Enix games and original characters.

Though Disney gave director Tetsuya Nomura freedom to choose which characters and worlds would be used in the games, he and his staff tried to stay within the established roles of characters and boundaries of the worlds. Nomura found managing and keeping multiple worlds consistent to be problematic. After determining the number of worlds in the universe, Nomura picked ones he felt would fit into the series' scenario, which was then evaluated by his team and Disney representatives. He tried to maintain the same number of worlds in each game and tried to minimize any overlap in the overall look and feel of each world, which he and his staff did by categorizing Disney worlds by appearance and setting. For example, a world based on The Jungle Book was considered for the first game, but was omitted because it was similar to Deep Jungle from Tarzan. They also took into account worlds with Disney characters that would be interesting. For example, Nomura chose to include a Mulan world for its unique atmosphere. The Tron world's design was meant to emulate an old computer game in the style of the 1982 film. Nomura got the idea to include this world after seeing a Disney employee working on Tron 2.0. He hoped that the fact that it was so different from the other worlds would make it enjoyable to players.

== Common elements ==
=== Characters ===
Kingdom Hearts features a mixture of Disney and Square Enix characters, as well as several new characters designed and created by Nomura. In addition to original locations, the Kingdom Hearts series features worlds from Disney films. Sora must visit these worlds and interact with various Disney characters to protect them from enemies. Often, his actions in these worlds closely follow the storylines of their respective Disney films. The main characters try not to interfere with the affairs of other worlds, as it could negatively affect the universe's order. Various Final Fantasy characters also make appearances within several worlds throughout the series. This includes Moogles, small creatures who are another common element in the games. They provide the player with a synthesis shop to create and purchase items used in the game. The main cast from The World Ends with You - Neku Sakuraba, Joshua, Beat, Rhyme, and Shiki - appear in Dream Drop Distance, and Kingdom Hearts III features characters from Pixar films such as the Toy Story series and Monsters, Inc. (2001), as well as Schwarzgeist, one of the bosses from Einhänder. Nevertheless, the usage of Disney characters is not without restrictions. For example, Nomura had requested the use of Oswald the Lucky Rabbit in Kingdom Hearts III, but the response from Disney was that the character would be "too difficult" to use, with no further clarification or details from Disney.

Common enemies in the series include the Heartless (ハートレス, Hātoresu), creatures who are born from the darkness of people's hearts, lack a soul, and seek to consume others' hearts. When Heartless are created, the body left behind becomes a Nobody (ノーバディ, Nōbadi). Nobodies typically have monstrous appearances, but the members of Organization XIII retain their human forms due to possessing strong hearts as humans and remembering their original selves. If both a Heartless and their Nobody counterpart are killed, then the original person is resurrected.

The Unversed (アンヴァース, Anvāsu) are creatures that are introduced and predominantly appear in Kingdom Hearts Birth by Sleep. Described by Nomura as being "those who are not well-versed in their own existences", they are Vanitas' emotions given form and feed on negativity. Vanitas pits these creatures against Ventus to strengthen him as part of Xehanort's plan to obtain the χ-blade. Upon defeat, the Unversed's negativity reintegrates with Vanitas, allowing him to recreate them no matter how many times they are destroyed.

Dream Eaters (ドリームイーター, Dorīmu Ītā) are primarily featured in Kingdom Hearts 3D: Dream Drop Distance. Like the Heartless, they are beings of darkness that inhabit the Sleeping worlds isolated from the realm of light and are compelled to find the worlds' keyholes. Dream Eaters manifest in two kinds: hostile "Nightmares", which devour good dreams and create bad ones and serve as the game's enemies; and benevolent "Spirits", which the player can create to serve as party members and combat the Nightmares. Additionally, cat-like Dream Eaters called Chirithy appears in Kingdom Hearts χ and Kingdom Hearts III as NPCs.

==== Heartless ====
The Heartless (ハートレス, Hātoresu) are creatures born from the darkness of people's hearts, and lack a body or soul. They are the most common type of enemy the player encounters in the Kingdom Hearts series, acting as forces of darkness who seek to consume more hearts, including those of worlds. Their name derives from their lack of a heart, despite originating from people's hearts after darkness consumes them.

Initially, the Heartless existed within an all-encompassing variety, the "Pureblood", and, prior to the events of the first Kingdom Hearts, they were typically only encountered in the realm of darkness, although people with a strong will may summon them to the realm of light. While studying the Pureblood Heartless, as a side effect of their research to control the mind through the heart, Xehanort and Ansem's other apprentices found a way to create artificial "Emblem" Heartless via the corruption of living hearts, which are differentiated from Purebloods by an insignia on their bodies. Unlike Purebloods, Emblem Heartless release hearts once defeated. However, unless the Keyblade is used to defeat the Heartless, the stolen hearts go to the realm of darkness and turn into Heartless again. This, combined with Maleficent's quest to gather the seven Princesses of Heart by using the forces of darkness, make the Heartless a common sight within the realm of light by the time of the first Kingdom Hearts.

Ordinarily, the Heartless are mindless and function on instinct, but obey those with a strong will. However, in worlds closer to darkness, the Heartless are more powerful and uncontrollable. They invade worlds through corridors of darkness, which are unpredictable pathways that interlink the worlds.

==== Nobody ====
When Heartless are created, the body and soul of those with strong hearts that have lost their hearts to darkness become another type of creature called a Nobody (ノーバディ, Nōbadi). As they lack hearts possessing light and darkness, they are "nothing", yet still exist within the Kingdom Hearts universe. Despite this, Nobodies can gain new hearts of their own over time, separate from their original selves. Nobodies typically assume malformed, inhuman shapes, but the members of Organization XIII keep their human forms because they possessed strong hearts as humans and thus remember their original self. Most members of the Organization control one type of Nobody suited to their fighting style, each corresponding to a job in Final Fantasy.

Like the Emblem Heartless, the Nobodies have an insignia—an upside-down, incomplete heart—which was designed to resemble a splintered heart as a complement to the Heartless emblem. Upon being defeated, a Nobody fades into a state of non-existence until its Heartless counterpart is destroyed with the captive heart released, recreating the original being.

Within the series, two Nobodies, Roxas and Naminé are considered "special cases" regarding the circumstances of their births. Both were created when Sora used Xehanort's Keyblade of heart to release his and Kairi's hearts, respectively, but coexist alongside their original selves, rather than in lieu of them. Unlike most of Organization XIII's members, who resemble their original selves with their memories and personalities intact, Roxas resembles Ventus rather than Sora due to holding the former's heart within himself, and lacks Sora's memories due to the short duration of Sora's Heartless state. Meanwhile, Naminé was born of Kairi's heart through Sora's body and, in addition to not having Kairi's memories, has the ability to alter the memories of Sora and those close to him.

==== Unversed ====
The Unversed (アンヴァース, Anvāsu) are creatures that are introduced and predominantly appear in Kingdom Hearts Birth by Sleep. Described by Nomura as being "those who are not well-versed in their own existences", they are Vanitas' emotions given form and feed on the negativity of others, which allows them to assume more powerful forms. Vanitas pits these creatures against his counterpart, Ventus, to strengthen him as part of Master Xehanort's plan to obtain the χ-blade. Upon defeat, the Unversed's negativity reintegrates with Vanitas, allowing him to recreate them no matter how many times they are destroyed. The Unversed cease to be after Vanitas integrates back into Ventus and is subsequently destroyed within Ventus's subconscious, but are temporarily restored following his return during the events of Kingdom Hearts III.

==== Bug Blox ====
Kingdom Hearts Coded includes software bugs, referred to in-game as Bug Blox (バグブロックス, Bagu Burokkusu) or simply "Bugs", who serve as the game's main antagonistic force. To investigate a message hidden in Jiminy Cricket's journal that Naminé left, King Mickey has the book digitized to uncover the mystery. However, due to the "hurt" the message contains, most of the data ended up corrupted and caused the data worlds to be infected with bugs. They primarily take the form of cubes that the game's main protagonist, a virtual replica of Sora called "Data-Sora", can destroy or use as platforms. There are several different varieties of Bug Blox, with the most common, breakable variety being black-and-red in color. Other bugs take the appearance of boss-level Heartless that Sora had defeated in Kingdom Hearts. Villains and boss-level Heartless make use of the bugs to assist them in fighting Data-Sora.

It is later revealed that the recording of Sora's Heartless had gained sentience and is responsible for the journal being blank even after Sora's memories were restored, because the book revolved around him. It seeks to devour the rest of the digital Heartless for power and escape into the real world to sate its hunger for hearts. While its most basic form is the weak and common "Shadow" variety of Heartless, it grows increasingly powerful and gains the ability to take other forms, such as an entirely black lookalike of Sora with yellow eyes or an enormous variety of Heartless called "Darkside". The bugs cease to be after Data-Sora destroys the original bug and resets the entire datascape.

==== Dream Eater ====
Dream Eaters (ドリームイーター, Dorīmu Ītā) are primarily featured in Kingdom Hearts 3D: Dream Drop Distance. Like the Heartless, they are beings of darkness that inhabit the Sleeping worlds isolated from the realm of light and are compelled to find the worlds' keyholes. Dream Eaters manifest in two kinds: hostile "Nightmares", which devour good dreams and create bad ones and serve as the game's enemies; and benevolent "Spirits", which the player can create to serve as party members and combat the Nightmares. Several boss enemy Nightmares appear under the control of Young Xehanort and various Disney villains throughout the game. Riku temporarily turns into a Dream Eater by subconsciously entering Sora's dreams upon sensing Xehanort's interference within the Mark of Mastery exam. Additionally, a type of Dream Eater called Chirithy appears in Kingdom Hearts χ and Kingdom Hearts III as NPCs.

=== Objects ===
==== Keyblade ====
The icon that represents the Keyblade

Keyblades (キーブレード, Kīburēdo) are key-shaped melee weapons created to combat darkness and are the only thing that can free hearts from a Heartless form, thus allowing the restoration of complete beings. Keyblades are also capable of locking and unlocking doors and keyholes. Initially, Keyblades were crafted in the image of the original "χ-blade" by those who wanted the light within Kingdom Hearts for themselves and those who sought the opposite. Wielders acknowledged as "Keyblade Masters" can bequeath the power to wield a Keyblade to one they deem worthy by letting them touch the handle of the blade or connecting their heart to another. There are also Keyblades like Xehanort's, which are passed down from different owners through generations.

Keyblades change in both appearance and strength with different keychains, which augment its wielder's fighting capabilities; some are obtained as a result of in-game events, while others can be obtained by completing mini-games. A driving element in the first game is the ability to seal the "heart" of a world by locking the keyhole to the door leading to it, preventing it from being destroyed by Heartless. In Kingdom Hearts II, the player uses the Keyblade to unlock pathways between worlds that were closed after the events of the first game. While Sora is the only one who uses the Keyblade in the first game, later games reveal more characters who wield Keyblades. In Birth by Sleep, Keyblades can be transformed into hovercraft called Keyblade Gliders, which can be used to travel from world to world, making Keyblade wielders the only people with the means of transportation between worlds before Gummi Ships are used. The "gates" Sora would open later are known as the Lanes Between, which can be accessed by any Keyblade wielder.

==== χ-blade ====
The χ-blade (χブレード, Kīburēdo; pronounced the same as "Keyblade") is an ancient weapon of unknown origin introduced in Birth by Sleep that is capable of directly unlocking Kingdom Hearts. It is a double-handed weapon that takes the shape of two "Kingdom Key" Keyblades that intersect in an "X" shape, with additional features that give it the shape of an actual sword. It has the power to open the heart of all worlds, and exists alongside Kingdom Hearts as its guardian. It led to "Keyblades" being crafted in its image by those seeking Kingdom Hearts' power, those who sought to extinguish the light, and those who sought to protect it. This resulted in the Keyblade War, which ended in a world known as the Keyblade Graveyard; the aftermath led the χ-blade to shatter into seven pieces of light and thirteen pieces of darkness. These seven lights, which are said to be the source of all light in the World, later became the hearts of the Princesses of Heart, who are targeted by Organization XIII as a result.

In Birth by Sleep, Master Xehanort's over-eagerness to obtain the weapon causes him to seek two hearts of equal strength—one of pure light and one of pure darkness—to fight each other. He finds such a means through his former apprentice Ventus and his personified darkness Vanitas, who Xehanort created and enlisted to ensure his plans succeeded. Though Ventus and Vanitas fuse back into one being with the χ-blade in hand, the unstable χ-blade explodes due to Vanitas' destruction within Ventus. Dream Drop Distance reveals that, as a contingency to his previous plan, Xehanort arranged the formation of his thirteen "Seekers of Darkness", the new Organization XIII composing of his various incarnations and vessels, to fight the Keyblade users, who would form seven "Guardians of Light".

==== Kingdom Hearts ====
The symbol that represents Kingdom Hearts

The titular Kingdom Hearts (キングダムハーツ, Kingudamu Hātsu) is the "heart of all worlds" and the source of hearts. It is an object of immense power, which caused conflict as its light drove many to fight over it in what became the Keyblade War. In the end, Kingdom Hearts was consumed in the darkness caused by the conflict, and the worlds became separate from each other. During Birth by Sleep, Master Xehanort seeks the return of Kingdom Hearts, and while it does appear over the Keyblade Graveyard, the flawed reunion of Ventus and Vanitas causes the unstable χ-blade to explode and Kingdom Hearts to vanish. After splitting himself into a Heartless and a Nobody, Ansem seeks out the Door to Darkness to gain access to an artificial Kingdom Hearts created from the hearts of worlds, while Xemnas seeks to create his own artificial Kingdom Hearts from the hearts of people. These artificial constructs, however, are only small-scale versions of the "true" Kingdom Hearts, which can only be accessed with its counterpart, the χ-blade.

Each Kingdom Hearts takes different shapes depending on from which hearts they are created. The first game's Kingdom Hearts, artificially created from the hearts of worlds, has the appearance of a sphere of light beyond a white door. The Kingdom Hearts made by Organization XIII, on the other hand, takes the form of a yellow heart-shaped moon. The authentic Kingdom Hearts called upon by the χ-blade is depicted as a blue heart-shaped moon in Birth by Sleep and yellow in Kingdom Hearts III.

=== Story ===
A boy named Sora is separated from his friends Riku and Kairi when dark beings called Heartless consume their home, Destiny Islands. Sora gains a Keyblade that lets him fight the Heartless, but a storm of darkness transports him to Traverse Town. There he meets Donald Duck and Goofy, who were sent by their missing king Mickey to find the Keyblade wielder. Together they travel to various worlds, battling Heartless and defeating Disney villains led by Maleficent. She recruits Riku to help gather the seven Princesses of Heart, whose power can access Kingdom Hearts, the heart of all worlds. After defeating Maleficent, Sora learns Kairi's heart has been residing inside him and sacrifices himself to revive her, becoming a Heartless, but Kairi restores him to his human form. The group discovers that a powerful Heartless named Ansem has possessed Riku and seeks Kingdom Hearts. Sora defeats Ansem but must leave Riku and Mickey in the Realm of Darkness while Kairi returns to the restored Destiny Islands, and Sora resolves to save his friends.

Their search leads them to Castle Oblivion, a fortress controlled by a group of Nobodies named Organization XIII. One member, Marluxia, forces the sorceress Naminé to alter the group's memories. After Marluxia's defeat, Naminé puts them in a year-long sleep to restore their memories. Meanwhile, Riku, aided by Mickey, ascends the castle and joins a man named DiZ to protect Sora. Unexpected events force Riku to capture Roxas—Sora's Nobody born when he sacrificed himself, and an Organization XIII member—after Roxas defeats Xion, a Replica of Sora in Kairi's image.

Roxas fuses with Sora, who awakens and resumes his search. Mickey's mentor Yen Sid familiarizes the trio with the Nobodies and Organization XIII's remaining members. The three reunite with Mickey, who reveals that the defeated "Ansem" was the Heartless of Xehanort, the real Ansem's apprentice, while Organization XIII's leader Xemnas is Xehanort's Nobody. The Organization seeks to regain their lost hearts and create an artificial Kingdom Hearts by having Keyblade users slay Heartless. Axel, a rogue Organization member, abducts Kairi in an attempt to reunite with Roxas, and sacrifices himself to help Sora's group reach Organization XIII's headquarters. DiZ, the real Ansem, is killed trying to destroy the artificial Kingdom Hearts. Sora and Riku defeat Xemnas, but become trapped in the Realm of Darkness. A letter from Kairi opens a path home, reuniting the two with their friends.

Mickey shares some history uncovered by Naminé: Xehanort was a Keyblade Master who manipulated Terra, Ventus, and Aqua, the apprentices of fellow Keyblade Master Eraqus. Xehanort possessed Terra, and Ventus sacrificed his heart to prevent Xehanort from recreating the χ-blade, which would allow its user to control Kingdom Hearts. Ventus' heart was absorbed into Sora, while Aqua placed Ventus' body in Castle Oblivion before becoming trapped within the Realm of Darkness. An amnesiac Xehanort, in Terra's body, became Ansem's apprentice. Destroying Xehanort's Heartless and Xemnas has fully resurrected him. Sora and Riku take the Mark of Mastery exam to prepare. During the exam they encounter a time-traveling younger Xehanort. They learn Organization XIII's true purpose was to provide thirteen vessels for Xehanort to battle seven hearts of pure light and recreate the χ-blade. Sora's interference forces Xehanort to gather his alternate selves from across time into Replica bodies, and Riku saves Sora from becoming the final vessel. Riku is declared a Keyblade Master, while Sora embarks on a journey to regain his Power of Waking, the ability to revive hearts, while Riku and Mickey search for Aqua in the Realm of Darkness. Yen Sid begins training Kairi and Lea as Keyblade wielders.

Sora regains his Power of Waking during his travels with Donald and Goofy. He and Riku find Aqua consumed by darkness, purify her, and restore Castle Oblivion as the Land of Departure to revive Ventus. At the Keyblade Graveyard, the guardians face Xehanort's forces. They are initially defeated and killed, but are revived by Sora's Power of Waking, which also calls on past Keyblade wielders. Saïx and Vexen sabotage the Organization's plans by restoring Roxas. The guardians defeat Xehanort's remaining selves while freeing Xion and Terra from his control. Xehanort kills Kairi to provoke Sora into manifesting the χ-blade, intending to use Kingdom Hearts to destroy reality, but Sora, Donald and Goofy finally defeat him. Sora revives Kairi again despite Mickey's warnings of overusing the Power of Waking. As the group celebrates on Destiny Islands, Sora fades away. Xigbar, revealed to be the reincarnated Keyblade Master Luxu, summons the Foretellers, his fellow Keyblade Masters, for the next phase of his mission. A year later Riku searches for Sora, believing him trapped in another reality. Elsewhere Sora encounters Yozora, a character from a video game in the Toy Story universe, who claims he must "save Sora". After a battle in what resembles a modern metropolis, Sora defeats Yozora, who fades away as Sora is transported elsewhere.

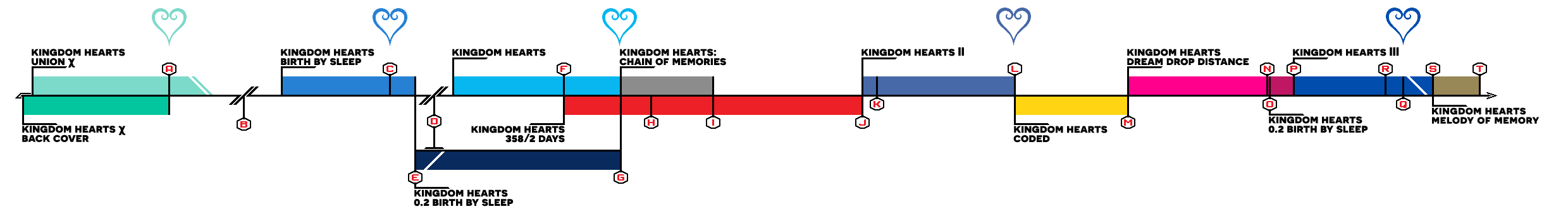
The Kingdom Hearts timeline

=== Gameplay ===
The Kingdom Hearts games contain elements of action role-playing games with hack-and-slash elements. The games are driven by a linear progression from one story event to the next, usually shown in the form of a cutscene, though there are numerous side quests available that provide bonus benefits to the characters. In most games, the player primarily controls the principal protagonist of the series, Sora. Sora is usually accompanied by Donald Duck and Goofy, who are artificial intelligence-controlled non-playable characters that aid Sora in battle. In the first and third game, their behavior can be altered to suit different combat objectives. The games feature real-time combat that incorporates physical attacks, magic, and summonings, though each game handles battles differently. The game also allows for items to be used on the field of battle to heal oneself or one's party members.

Gummi Ships are another common element of the series, which serve as the main mode of transportation between worlds in the games. The gameplay for the Gummi Ship sections is more akin to a rail shooter. Because it received negative criticism in the first game, it was modified in the third game. Most games also feature a journal which is accessible from the main menu. This journal keeps track of information regarding the story, characters, enemies, and locations. In Kingdom Hearts, Chain of Memories, Kingdom Hearts II, and Kingdom Hearts III, the journal is kept by Jiminy Cricket, who was appointed by Queen Minnie as the royal chronicler. In 358/2 Days, Birth by Sleep, and Dream Drop Distance, the main characters write their own journal entries.

A battle in the first Kingdom Hearts game

The games are influenced by their parent franchise, Final Fantasy, and carry its gameplay elements over into their own action-based, hack-and-slash system. Like many traditional role-playing games, Kingdom Hearts features an experience point system which determines character development. As enemies are defeated, the player gains experience which culminates in a "level-up", where the characters grow stronger and gain access to new abilities. The amount of experience is shared with all party members and each character grows stronger as experience is gained.

=== Music ===
The music for the series has been primarily composed by Yoko Shimomura. Kaoru Wada works as the arranger for orchestral music, including orchestral renditions of the main vocal themes and the ending themes. The orchestral music was performed by the New Japan Philharmonic Orchestra and the Tokyo Philharmonic Orchestra. Soundtracks were released for the first and third installments following the release of their respective games. A compilation soundtrack was later released that included soundtracks for the entire series, including reworked tracks for the re-released Kingdom Hearts Re:Chain of Memories.

While the themes for some of the Disney-based worlds are taken directly from their Disney film counterparts, most of them are given entirely original musical scores. In addition to each world having unique background music, each is given its own battle theme rather than having a common theme to cover all fights. Several of the main characters have themes, and the final boss of each game has several themes played in the various phases of those fights. The fights with Sephiroth feature a modified version of Nobuo Uematsu's "One-Winged Angel" from Final Fantasy VII.

The main theme songs for the Kingdom Hearts games were written and performed by Japanese singer Hikaru Utada. The three main themes are "Hikari", originally from Kingdom Hearts, "Passion", from Kingdom Hearts II, and "Oath" from Kingdom Hearts III. Each song has an English counterpart, "Simple and Clean", "Sanctuary", and "Don't Think Twice" respectively, for the North American and European releases. Utada was the only singer Tetsuya Nomura had in mind for the first Kingdom Hearts theme song. This marked the first time Utada had produced a song for a video game. Both of the first two theme songs reached notable popularity; on weekly Oricon charts, "Hikari" reached No. 1 in 2002 and "Passion" reached No. 4 in 2005.

=== Universe ===
The World That Never Was is a setting introduced in a secret trailer in Kingdom Hearts. The heart-shaped moon is an attempt to create an imitation of "Kingdom Hearts", a central plot point throughout the series.

The Kingdom Hearts universe is divided into planes of existence called "realms". Most of the series takes place in the "Realm of Light". Opposite the Realm of Light is the "Realm of Darkness", where Kingdom Hearts resides and where Heartless are born. The "Realm Between" is a plane where Nobodies come into existence. Additionally, there is the "Realm of Sleep" where the Sleeping Worlds featured in Kingdom Hearts 3D: Dream Drop Distance are located.

In the Kingdom Hearts universe, travelling between worlds is normally not possible, and they are protected from extraterrestrial interference by an invisible shell. When the heart of a world is opened, the shell breaks apart, appearing as a meteor shower. Fragments from the wall are called "Gummi blocks" and are used to make spaceships called "Gummi Ships", which can be shaped into any structure, and the origin of the material used to build them allows travel to other worlds. Gummi blocks serve different functions, from navigation to offense and defense. Other methods to travel between worlds are the "corridors of darkness" and the "lanes between"—interdimensional pathways through which frequent travel eventually erodes unprotected users' hearts with darkness. Heartless and Nobodies normally use these paths, but other characters have used them, including Riku and Mickey Mouse.

Those who travel between worlds are advised to limit their interactions with their inhabitants to avoid causing chaos. For this reason, the main characters change their appearance in certain worlds to avoid standing out. In the worlds based on The Little Mermaid and The Nightmare Before Christmas, Sora, Donald, and Goofy transform into undersea creatures and Halloween monsters, respectively. For The Lion King, they transform into savannah animals because Nomura felt that it would be odd to have them appear in their standard forms when no humans appear in the film.

==== Disney worlds ====
Most worlds that appear in the games are based on Disney films and follow abridged versions of their stories, such as in Wonderland, the Land of Dragons, and Castle of Dreams. Agrabah covers the first two Aladdin films in Kingdom Hearts and Kingdom Hearts II, while Atlantica and Halloween Town have original plots in the first game and plots based on their films in the second game. Worlds like Monstro and Neverland focus heavily on the main plot, the latter being reduced to Captain Hook's ship, where Riku reveals to Sora that Kairi has lost her heart. These worlds would not be able to be explored fully until the releases of Kingdom Hearts 3D: Dream Drop Distance, Kingdom Hearts 358/2 Days and Kingdom Hearts Birth by Sleep, respectively. In Beauty and the Beast, the Beast appears in Kingdom Hearts to aid Sora when he temporarily loses the Keyblade, and after the restoration of Beast's Castle, he becomes a pawn in the plot of Organization XIII during Kingdom Hearts II.

During the development of Kingdom Hearts II, Nomura had more creative freedom due to advances in technology, which Port Royal/The Caribbean, Space Paranoids, and Pride Lands benefited from. In Port Royal and Space Paranoids, the character models were generated from live-action pictures using a new program. Nomura had wanted to include a world based on The Lion King in the first game, but was unable to since the engine could not process quadrupedal character models properly, a feature included in Kingdom Hearts II.

Birth by Sleep introduced several new Disney-based worlds to the series: Castle of Dreams, Enchanted Dominion, Dwarf Woodlands and Deep Space. Dream Drop Distance included more new Disney worlds, such as La Cité des Cloches, The Grid, Prankster's Paradise, Country of the Musketeers, and Symphony of Sorcery.

Kingdom Hearts III introduces more worlds, such as Kingdom of Corona, San Fransokyo, Toy Box, Monstropolis, and Arendelle. When questioned on the possibility of including worlds based on Disney-purchased properties such as Pixar, Marvel Entertainment and Lucasfilm, co-director Tai Yasue said, "We have to come up with a world that has a lot of originality. We want variety... so we don't want too many of one sort of world, that would look the same. For each world there has to be some meaning for it, in the plot... Also, gameplay-wise, is that world something that would make gameplay fun?" The game does not feature any worlds based on Final Fantasy.

In addition to the Gummi Ship mini-game, mini-games feature prominently in certain worlds. While Atlantica is an ordinary world in Kingdom Hearts, albeit with a unique "underwater" control scheme, it becomes an interactive rhythm game in Kingdom Hearts II which is unrelated to the overall story and serves as filler. Space Paranoids features a Light Cycle mini-game that strongly deviates from the original film, which Nomura included because he knew people associated the Light Cycles with Tron.

- Disney Town: The homeworld of Mickey, Donald, Goofy, and Pete. Parts of it include Disney Castle and two sub-worlds that depict the world's past. The first is called the Timeless River, which is the past of Disney Castle, shortly before it was built. The world is portrayed in black and white, which Nomura had intended from the beginning of development. The world has many throwback effects, including intentionally poor sound quality to imitate old cartoons that Disney produced in the 1920s and 1930s. In this world, Sora's character model is simplified to the style of early cartoons, while Goofy and Donald Duck revert to their original designs from when they first appeared in Disney cartoons. The second sub-world is a sleeping world known as the Country of the Musketeers.
- The Mysterious Tower: The residence of Yen Sid, which includes the sub-world Symphony of Sorcery that depicts the tower as it appeared in the past, when Mickey had become Yen Sid's apprentice.
- The 100 Acre Wood: The residence of Winnie the Pooh and friends, which is accessed via a book and consists of mini-games based on classic Winnie the Pooh shorts, with Sora taking on the role of Christopher Robin.
- Olympus Coliseum: The homeworld of Hercules, which serves as a place for optional fighting tournaments. Due to Hades' popularity, the Underworld was added in Kingdom Hearts II, where he has opened a tournament.

==== Original worlds ====
The worlds created specifically for the series predominantly feature original and Square Enix characters and are more integral to the series' overarching plot. The first world of each game serves as a tutorial to introduce new gameplay elements and frame the story. Both they and the Disney worlds are fragments of the original world, which is identified in Kingdom Hearts III as Scala Ad Caelum, the seat of power for the ancient Keyblade masters that serves as the game's final dungeon.

- Destiny Islands: The homeworld of Sora, Riku, and Xehanort.
- Traverse Town: A world that serves as a haven for those whose homes were destroyed by the Heartless. It serves as a hub world in Kingdom Hearts and a sleeping world in Dream Drop Distance. The main cast from The World Ends with You appears in the latter game, where the world is used to host the Reaper's Game.
- Radiant Garden: The homeworld of Ansem the Wise and his apprentices as well as various Final Fantasy characters, and Kairi's birthplace. Because of Xehanort's machinations, Ansem's study of the darkness in people's hearts enables Terra-Xehanort to bring Radiant Garden to ruin. Throughout Kingdom Hearts and most of Kingdom Hearts II, Radiant Garden is known as Hollow Bastion. Maleficent uses it as her base during the first game, while Squall and his group rebuilds the world, as shown in Kingdom Hearts II.
- The End of the World: A land created from the remnants of worlds destroyed by the Heartless, which serves as the final world in Kingdom Hearts.
- The Realm of Darkness: The world of the Pureblood Heartless, where Riku and Mickey appear at the end of Kingdom Hearts and help Sora seal the door linking it to the End of the World. Sora and Riku briefly visit the realm at the end of Kingdom Hearts II, while Aqua spends years trapped in it following the events of Birth by Sleep.
- The Land of Departure: The homeworld of Eraqus and his apprentices, which acted on the will of Eraqus before he passed his title to his apprentice Aqua. Following the end of Birth by Sleep, Aqua uses her power to transform the main castle of the Land of Departure into Castle Oblivion. Castle Oblivion serves as the main setting of Chain of Memories, with its multiple floors holding memory-based reconstructions of other worlds created via unique cards. Aqua restores the world to its original state in Kingdom Hearts III.
- Twilight Town: The homeworld of Hayner, Pence, and Olette, where Ansem the Wise takes refuge as DiZ. It serves as both a tutorial world and the penultimate world in Kingdom Hearts II. It returns as a hub in Kingdom Hearts III.
- The World That Never Was: A world in the in-between realm that Organization XIII uses as their base of operations while working on their artificial Kingdom Hearts. It serves as the final world in Kingdom Hearts II and Dream Drop Distance. This conception of Kingdom Hearts was designed to appear as the heart-shaped moon from the first Kingdom Hearts game cover. When the scenario writer, Kazushige Nojima, created the scenario, he described it as a moon floating in the World That Never Was. Upon reading this, Nomura thought of using the visuals from the first game to create a connection.
- The Keyblade Graveyard: A world that was the site of the final battle of the Keyblade War, and is the setting of the climax in Birth by Sleep and Kingdom Hearts III.
- Scala ad Caelum: A vast city that was the seat of power for the ancient Keyblade masters and where Eraqus and Xehanort trained in their youth, as seen in Kingdom Hearts Dark Road. It later serves as the site of Sora's final battle with Xehanort in Kingdom Hearts III. Scala ad Caelum was set to return as the main world of Kingdom Hearts Missing-Link prior to the game's cancellation.
- Daybreak Town: The homeworld of the Foretellers and their Unions, which serves as the hub world in Kingdom Hearts χ. It is left in ruins following the Keyblade War, and Scala ad Caelum was built upon its remains.
- The Final World: A realm on the edge of reality inhabited by faded remnants of those unable to move on due to their hearts' strong attachments. Sora unknowingly appeared in the Final World during his dreams before ending up in the realm during his group's battle with Terra-Xehanort. Though Sora is able to return, he ends up back in the Final World after sacrificing himself to revive Kairi.
- Quadratum: A "fictional" world that resembles real life Shibuya. Ansem the Wise believes that Quadratum exists in a realm of fiction outside of the main universe.

== Development and history ==
=== History ===
The initial idea for Kingdom Hearts began with a discussion between Shinji Hashimoto and Hironobu Sakaguchi about Super Mario 64. They were planning to make a game with freedom of movement in three dimensions like Super Mario 64 but lamented that only characters as popular as Disney's could rival a Mario game. Tetsuya Nomura, overhearing their conversation, volunteered to lead the project and the two producers agreed to let him direct. A chance meeting between Hashimoto and a Disney executive in an elevator (Square and Disney previously shared the same building in Japan) allowed Hashimoto to pitch the idea directly to Disney. Development began in February 2000 with Nomura as director and Hashimoto as producer. While Nomura had done previous work in the Final Fantasy series as monster designer and graphic director, he did not gain widespread recognition until he was the lead character designer for Final Fantasy VII. Kingdom Hearts marked his transition into a directorial position, though he also served as the game's character designer. Scenarios were provided by Kazushige Nojima who was a scenario writer for Square from Final Fantasy VII until he left in 2003. Originally the development focused on the gameplay with a simple story to appeal to Disney's target age range. After Kingdom Hearts executive producer Hironobu Sakaguchi told Nomura the game would be a failure if it did not aim for the same level as the Final Fantasy series, he began to develop the story further. In June 2013, Nomura stated the name of the game came from him thinking about Disney Theme Parks, especially Animal Kingdom. However, Nomura could not get the IP with just "Kingdom", so the development team began to think about "heart" as a core part of the story, so they decided to combine the two to form "Kingdom Hearts".

Nomura placed a secret trailer in Kingdom Hearts in hopes that fans would want a sequel. He was unsure if fans would want a sequel and felt that if they did not, then it would be best to leave certain events in the first game unexplained. After Kingdom Hearts Final Mix was completed, development for Kingdom Hearts II began. There were several obstacles to clear before development could begin on a sequel. One was the development team's desire to showcase Mickey Mouse more; Mickey's inclusion in the first game was restricted to a very small role. Nomura had planned for the sequel to take place a year after the first and originally intended for the events of that year to be left unexplained. To bridge the gap between the two games, Kingdom Hearts: Chain of Memories was developed. Nomura was hesitant about releasing a game on the Game Boy Advance because he felt the 3D graphics of the original game would not translate well into 2D. He changed his position after hearing that children wanted to play Kingdom Hearts on the handheld system.

=== Creation and design ===
Though Disney gave Nomura freedom in the characters and worlds used for the games, he and his staff tried to stay within the established roles of characters and boundaries of the worlds. Nomura has stated that though many of the Disney characters are not normally dark and serious, there were not many challenges making them so for the story and despite this, their personalities shine because they maintain their own characteristics. He also felt managing and keeping multiple worlds was problematic. When deciding which worlds to include in the game, the development staff tried to take into account worlds with Disney characters that would be interesting and made an effort to minimize any overlap in the overall look and feel of each world.

The inclusion of specific Final Fantasy characters was based on the opinions of both fans and staff. Another criterion for inclusion was whether the staff felt the characters would fit into the storyline and in the Kingdom Hearts universe. Initially, Nomura was hesitant to use characters he did not design, because he was unfamiliar with the backstory of such characters. For Kingdom Hearts II, he changed his mind after receiving pressure from his staff. Throughout the development of the games, Nomura has often left certain events and connections between characters unexplained until the release of future games. Nomura does this because he feels that games should have room for fans to speculate and use their imagination. He has stated that with speculation, even though a game gets old, people can still be happy with it.

== Promotion and marketing ==
The first Kingdom Hearts was announced at E3 in May 2001. Initial details were that it would be a collaboration between Square and Disney Interactive, and would feature worlds developed by both companies and Disney characters. New characters were designed by Nomura and include Sora, Riku, Kairi, and the Heartless. On May 14, 2002, a press release announced a list of the English voice actors. The list included Haley Joel Osment, David Gallagher, and Hayden Panettiere as the three new characters introduced into the game. It was also announced that many of the Disney characters would be voiced by the official voice actors from their respective Disney films.

A secret trailer in the first Kingdom Hearts and Kingdom Hearts Final Mix hinted at the possibility of a sequel. Rumors for a sequel on the PlayStation 2 were spurred in Japan when a Japanese video game site, Quiter, stated that "an internal (and anonymous) source at Square Japan" confirmed that development of Kingdom Hearts II had begun. It was not until Kingdom Hearts II was announced, along with Kingdom Hearts: Chain of Memories, at the Tokyo Game Show in September 2003 that rumors were confirmed. Initial details were that it would take place some time after Kingdom Hearts: Chain of Memories, which takes place directly after the first game. Other details included the return of Sora, Donald, and Goofy, as well as new costumes. At the 2004 Square Enix E3 press conference, the producer, Shinji Hashimoto, stated that many mysteries of the first game would be answered.

To help market the games, websites were set up for each game and demos were on display at gaming events. Each game in the main series was also re-released in Japan with additional content and served as canonical updates to the series. The additional content foreshadowed later plot elements in the series. The rereleases of the main series games had the term "Final Mix" added after the title, while Kingdom Hearts: Chain of Memories and Kingdom Hearts Coded were re-released as Kingdom Hearts Re:Chain of Memories and Kingdom Hearts Re:coded and released on the PlayStation 2 and Nintendo DS, respectively, with 3D graphics, voice overs during some cutscenes, and new game content.

=== Merchandise ===
Both Square Enix and Disney have released a wide variety of Kingdom Hearts merchandise including toys, figurines, clothing, and jewelry. Two of the games, Kingdom Hearts and Kingdom Hearts II, had a soundtrack released to coincide with the video games. These were followed by a nine CD complete set which featured both soundtracks and unreleased tracks. Kingdom Hearts has been adapted as a trading card game by the Tomy corporation of Japan. An English version of the game was released in November 2007 by Fantasy Flight Games. The video games have also been adapted into manga and novel series.

Like the Final Fantasy games, a series of "Ultimania" books were released in Japan for many of the games. These books include game walkthroughs, interviews, and extra information from the developers. Kingdom Hearts -Another Report- was released along with Kingdom Hearts II Final Mix+ and features game information, visuals by Shiro Amano, and a director interview. In North America, Brady Games released strategy guides for each game. For Kingdom Hearts II, they released two versions, a standard version and a limited-edition version. The limited edition was available in four different covers and included a copy of Jiminy's Journal along with 400 stickers.

== Reception ==
Japanese and Western review scores As of January 24, 2019.
Game	Famitsu	Metacritic
Kingdom Hearts	36/40	85
Kingdom Hearts: Chain of Memories	36/40	76
Kingdom Hearts II	39/40	87
Kingdom Hearts Re:Chain of Memories		68
Kingdom Hearts 358/2 Days	36/40	75
Kingdom Hearts Birth by Sleep	37/40	82
Kingdom Hearts Re:coded		66
Kingdom Hearts 3D: Dream Drop Distance	38/40	75
Kingdom Hearts HD 1.5 Remix		77
Kingdom Hearts HD 2.5 Remix		81
Kingdom Hearts Unchained χ		70
Kingdom Hearts HD 2.8 Final Chapter Prologue	34/40	78
Kingdom Hearts HD 1.5 + 2.5 Remix		84
Kingdom Hearts III	39/40	83
Kingdom Hearts: Melody of Memory	34/40	74

The Kingdom Hearts series has been critically and commercially successful. As of March 2014, the series has sold over 20 million copies worldwide. The three main games in the series all met with positive sales at the time of their releases. In the first two months since the North American release of Kingdom Hearts, it was one of the top three highest-selling video games. Chain of Memories sold 104,000 units in 48 hours in Japan, a record for a Game Boy Advance game at the time. Its positive debut sales placed it in the top spot of sales charts in Japan. In the first month of its North American release, it was ranked 1st on GameSpot's ChartSpot for portable systems and 6th for all consoles. Within three days of the Kingdom Hearts II release in Japan, it shipped 1 million copies, selling through within a month. By the end of March 2006, the NPD Group reported that Kingdom Hearts II was the highest-selling console game in North America, with 614,000 copies. In the month after its release in North America, Kingdom Hearts II sold an estimated 1 million copies. As of February 2019, the Kingdom Hearts series has shipped more than 30 million copies worldwide. This number reached to over 35 million copies shipped by October 2021. On April 11, 2022, Kingdom Hearts III was revealed to reach a total of 6.7 million units as of September 2021 surpassing Kingdom Hearts 6 million units to become the current best selling title in the series. As of March 2022, the Kingdom Hearts series has shipped more than 36 million copies worldwide.

The games have also received high ratings and positive comments from reviewers. All of the main games in the series have scored a 36 out of 40 or higher from the Japanese gaming magazine Famitsu, known for its harsh grading. All six games have been praised for their visuals. Game Informer considers the series the eleventh "must-play PlayStation 2" series. The individual games have also won several awards. GameSpot commented that the concept of mixing the serious elements of Final Fantasy with the lighter elements of Disney seemed impossible, but was pulled off quite well. Because of that they awarded Kingdom Hearts "Best Crossover Since Capcom vs. SNK" in their 2002 Best and Worst of the Year awards. IGN named Kingdom Hearts "Best Art Style/Direction" in their 2003 list of "Best Looking Games on PS2". G4 awarded it "Best Story" at their 2003 G-Phoria awards show. Electronic Gaming Monthly awarded Kingdom Hearts II "Best Sequel" of 2006. It tied with Resident Evil 4 as Famitsu's Game of the Year 2005. The manga series has also been well received. Several of the manga volumes were listed on USA Today's "Top 150 best sellers". The highest ranked volume was Kingdom Hearts volume 4 at #73. Every volume listed stayed on the list for at least two weeks; Kingdom Hearts volume 4 stayed the longest at four weeks.

The series' setting has garnered mostly positive reception from critics. Following Kingdom Hearts' initial announcement, publications expressed skepticism towards the first game's viability. Andrew Reiner of Game Informer stated that despite the extreme differences between Final Fantasy and Disney properties, they blend well together along with the new content created for the series. A second Game Informer reviewer, Matt Miller, described the concept as a "hard sell", describing the combination of the two properties as "ridiculous". He also stated his belief that the franchise's formula is successful. The graphics of the games have received generous praise, with particular focus on their similarity to the source material. IGN stated that the "worlds look very much like their filmed counterparts". Japanese gaming site, Gpara.com also praised the look of the worlds. GameSpot referred to the worlds as "wonderfully rich familiar environments", and GamePro described the worlds as "spot-on with the original movies."

Following the release of the first game, the Disney settings were well received by critics. Allgame's Scott Marriott stated the Disney settings are the most attractive feature of the game and considered some of the world choices a surprise. He praised the level designs, commenting that many familiar elements from the Disney films were integrated into them. Marriott further stated that though the stages were small, interacting with beloved characters and exploring familiar settings were enjoyable aspects. Maura Sutton of Computer and Video Games attributed the Disney elements as a major factor in creating the game's "astounding worlds". She summarized her review by calling Kingdom Hearts a "delightful mixture of two enchanted worlds". Video game critics of Kingdom Hearts: Chain of Memories expressed disappointment at the limited number of new worlds to explore in the game. 1UP.com's Bryan Intihar lauded Kingdom Hearts II's environment, calling it appealing and stating it was an improvement over the first title's. He described the level designs as "impeccable", citing the presentation of the Timeless River stage's atmosphere. Intihar further commented that the expansions and changes to previous worlds made them "feel fresh". In contrast, Reiner described the Disney elements in Kingdom Hearts II as "tacked on".

== See also ==
- List of Square Enix video game franchises
