= Kingdom Hearts Mobile =

2008 video game

- Developer: Square Enix/Disney Mobile
- Type: Online community service Virtual world
- Launched: JP: December 15, 2008
- Last updated: December 17, 2009
- Platform: NTT DoCoMo
- Status: Defunct on April 30, 2013
- Website: Official website

Kingdom Hearts Mobile (Japanese: キングダム ハーツ モバイル, Hepburn: Kingudamu Hātsu Mobairu) was an online community-based social gaming networking service developed by Square Enix for the NTT DoCoMo in partnership with Disney Mobile Japan. It was launched on December 15, 2008 in Japan in conjunction with the video game Kingdom Hearts coded for mobile phones.

Mobile is not part of the main Kingdom Hearts storyline. It consists of various mini-games as well as downloadable Kingdom Hearts related content such as ringtones and wallpapers. The service ended on April 30, 2013.

== Gameplay ==
Avatars of Sora and Kairi in Kingdom Hearts Mobile

Kingdom Hearts Mobile is a 2D online world known as the Avatar Kingdom where players can explore and roam around freely as their avatars.

=== Avatars ===
Players roam the Avatar Kingdom by controlling their own customized avatar which can be personalized through various means and items. These include outfits, weapons, and items which are purchasable in the game's online store using the virtual currency munny. Avatars are used to play mini-games, meet up and chat with friends as well as do activities together within the Avatar Kingdom. Outfits as well as backgrounds can be earned by players whenever they complete an episode of Kingdom Hearts coded.

=== Areas ===
There are many areas located within the Avatar Kingdom, including areas for downloading items, socializing, and playing mini-games. The areas are as follows: Event Hall which serves as the main area for people to participate together with friends in activities; Point Bank where players can keep track of their points as well as munny that they have earned; Mini-game Item Shop where avatars can buy outfits based on Kingdom Hearts characters which they have earned by winning certain mini-games; Point Item Shop where players can buy different clothes for their avatars as well as customizing the avatar's facial features and hairstyles; Mini-game Shop where players can buy new mini-games; Information Center which provides help and support for players; V Net Room which is the player's own personal area where you can customize profiles, view friends and email other avatars; Point Melody Shop where players can buy ringtones based on songs from Kingdom Hearts games; Point Art Gallery where players can buy various backgrounds, wallpapers, graphics or icon based on the Kingdom Hearts series; Awards Area which is the player's own trophy room displaying the player's high scores at mini-games; Changing Area which is where the player can customize your avatars clothing and items.

=== Mini-games ===
An avatar playing the mini-game Rhythm Parade.

There are various types of mini-games scattered all around the Avatar Kingdom which players can engage their avatars in these include: Magical Canvas, Pair Card Battle, Card Struggle, Balloon Glider, Gummi Ship Studio, Card Struggle II, and Rhythm Parade. Each game is unique and contains its own unique gameplay such as Card Struggle being based on Spider Solitaire, Gummi Ship Studio on traditional color-based puzzle games, Rhythm Parade on popular music games which involves pressing a string of buttons based on what appears on-screen, and Balloon Glider on one of the mini-games in the 100 Acre Wood world of Kingdom Hearts Re:Chain of Memories.

== Development ==
Kingdom Hearts Mobile was announced at the same time as Kingdom Hearts coded and launched a month later on December 15, 2008 in Japan. Various updates have been added to it such as new costumes to coincide with the release of new episodes of Kingdom Hearts coded as well as new areas to explore, and new mini-games to play such as Rhythm Parade which was added in September 2009.

Kingdom Hearts Mobile celebrated its first anniversary on December 15, 2009 with special events going on within the Avatar Kingdom as well as new costumes of Terra, Aqua, and Ventus from Kingdom Hearts Birth by Sleep, which was released less than a month later. On December 27, 2009, Square Enix released special Kingdom Hearts-themed wallpapers for mobile phones to celebrate Christmas, as well as additional wallpapers to celebrate its first anniversary.

== Reception ==
The art style has been called "cute" by Wired Magazine and "disgustingly cute" by Siliconera. The game's art style was used again in Theatrhythm Final Fantasy, Kingdom Hearts Re:coded, and Final Fantasy Airborne Brigade.
