= Kingdom Hearts Dark Road =

2020 video game

- Key art featuring (left to right) Eraqus, Urd, Xehanort, Hermod, Vor, and Bragi
- Developers: Square Enix; Success; BitGroove
- Publisher: Square Enix
- Directors: Tetsuya Nomura; Hiroyuki Itou; Yu Suzuki; Satoru Imai; Shuko Mitsuda
- Producers: Hironori Okayama; Naoya Matsumoto
- Designers: Masahiro Ishihara; Haruki Nakano; Yoshiaki Kasa; Takashi Kato; Kazuki Sato; Yusuke Matsuda
- Programmer: Takahiro Hojo
- Artist: Tatsuya Kando
- Writers: Masaru Oka; Tetsuya Nomura
- Composers: Yoko Shimomura; Tsuyoshi Sekito
- Series: Kingdom Hearts
- Platforms: Android; iOS
- Release: WW: June 22, 2020
- Genre: Role-playing
- Mode: Single-player

Kingdom Hearts Dark Road (Note: Japanese: キングダム ハーツ ダーク ロード, Hepburn: Kingudamu Hātsu Dāku Rōdo) is a 2020 role-playing video game developed by Square Enix (in collaboration with Disney Interactive Studios), BitGroove and Success, and published by Square Enix for Android and iOS as the thirteenth installment in the Kingdom Hearts series. It is a prequel that explores the origins of series antagonist Xehanort and his eventual turn to darkness.

The game launched in June 2020 as a standalone game accessed through the Kingdom Hearts Union χ mobile app, which was rebranded as Kingdom Hearts Union χ Dark Road. In February 2021, Square Enix announced that Kingdom Hearts Union χ Dark Road would be shutting down its online features and transitioning into an offline app. Dark Road was made unplayable during this transition period until August 2022, when its final update was released. The app was delisted from all storefronts in August 2024.

== Gameplay ==
Gameplay in Dark Road combines elements of role-playing games and deck-building games. Players construct a deck of cards, each of which features a red, blue, or green background with a gold "upright" or dark "reversed" border; decks can contain a maximum of 30 cards, and must contain equal numbers of cards with each background color and border. Cards are divided into attack, magic, and support types, which determines their abilities. New cards could be obtained by purchasing them from the in-game shop using premium currency, earned in events, or won through a premium draw; following the offline update, all 88 cards can be purchased from the shop. Collecting duplicates of a card will automatically boost its base power, up to 10 levels.

In combat, the player controls Xehanort, with Eraqus and one of four others (Hermod, Bragi, Urd, or Vor) as computer-controlled party members, while enemies attack based on a timer similar to an Active Time Battle. During a battle, five random cards from the player's deck will appear at the bottom of the screen. The player selects three of the available cards, with the first in the sequence determining Xehanort's action, while the remaining two cards will raise the ability's efficacy by up to double if they are the same color. The three cards are then discarded and replaced with others from the deck, which continues until all cards have been used. Alternately, an "auto battle" option can be activated at any time, with the game automatically selecting and playing cards for as long as it is enabled, requiring no player input. If the player runs out of cards, they will enter a "reload" state and briefly be unable to act until their deck is replenished. Dealing damage and defeating enemies will fill a meter at the bottom of the screen; when full, a "bonus time" state will be activated, temporarily causing all card combinations to be doubly effective regardless of color. Defeating enemies in battles will earn Battle Points (BP), which can be spent to increase Xehanort's level. Following the offline update, BP is also used for all shop purchases.

To progress through the game's story, the player must complete "quests", which feature battles against predetermined sets of enemies. Prior to the game's offline update, additional missions would occasionally appear, requiring certain objectives be fulfilled before the next quest would be unlocked. The story is divided into eight chapters, with three chapters containing 70 quests released throughout 2020; the remaining chapters and 35 quests were added with the offline update. The player can also participate in "world battles", in which the player battles endless waves of random opponents to grind for additional BP.

An in-game album lists every card the player has collected and enemy they have defeated, along with the total numbers of each; the player will receive a small increase to one of Xehanort's stats whenever these numbers reach a specific milestone. A crafting menu allows players to use materials collected from defeated enemies to create accessories, which can be equipped to Xehanort to further improve his stats. The game also includes a theater mode to replay any previously viewed story cutscenes.

== Synopsis ==
=== Setting ===
Kingdom Hearts Dark Road is set roughly 65 years prior to the events of Kingdom Hearts Birth by Sleep. The story explores the origins of series antagonist Xehanort, including his friendship with fellow Keyblade wielder Eraqus and his growing fascination with the nature of darkness, which leads to the events of Kingdom Hearts' "Dark Seeker Saga". During the game, Xehanort visits several worlds based on Disney films, all of which were previously featured in Kingdom Hearts χ, including Agrabah (Aladdin); Wonderland (Alice in Wonderland); Dwarf Woodlands (Snow White and the Seven Dwarfs); Beast's Castle (Beauty and the Beast); and Olympus Coliseum (Hercules). Scala ad Caelum, a world first seen in Kingdom Hearts III, acts as a central hub for the characters in the story.

=== Story ===
As a child, Xehanort lives on the Destiny Islands under the care of his elderly mentor, a former Keyblade wielder who was reborn in a new vessel. (Note: As depicted in Kingdom Hearts Union χ (2015).) The mentor believes Xehanort to be the "child of destiny", a prophesied savior of the world, and has sequestered him there to hide him from the thirteen incarnations of True Darkness until he becomes strong enough to defeat them. Years later, the mentor dies and a teenage Xehanort is approached by Ansem, his Heartless from the future, who transports him to Scala ad Caelum, a world where Keyblade wielders are trained.

Two years later, Xehanort — now a Keyblade wielder — and his classmates Eraqus, Hermod, Bragi, Urd, and Vor are told by their master, Odin, that seven upperclassmen have gone missing before their Mark of Mastery exam. Their fellow classmate Baldr has also left in search of his sister, Hoder, who is one of the missing upperclassmen. Odin tasks the youths to explore the many worlds and find the missing students, reminding them not to interfere in the affairs of other worlds.

Xehanort and his friends eventually find three of the upperclassmen – Vidar, Vala, and Vali – who have been stealing items essential to worlds' natural order. Having learned of the True Darknesses from Odin, Vidar explains that his group seeks to purge the world of them by finding the seven pure lights needed to summon Kingdom Hearts. Most of Xehanort's class opposes this, realizing this could destroy the worlds, but a sympathetic Vor joins the upperclassmen. Baldr returns, revealing Hoder was killed protecting him, and suggests they go to the Underworld to find her and gain more information on Vidar's plan. There they find the souls of Hoder and her fellow upperclassmen — Heimdall, Helgi and Sigrun — learning that Vidar's intention is to avenge their deaths. Hades attempts to trap them all in the Underworld, and the group is separated; only Xehanort and Eraqus are found and rescued by Odin.

After they return, Scala ad Caelum comes under attack by Baldr, revealed to have been possessed by an incarnation of lesser Darkness, which killed Hoder to make Baldr vulnerable to its possession. Baldr reveals he killed the other upperclassmen to trick the survivors into summoning Kingdom Hearts, with which he intends to consume the worlds with darkness, having also killed Urd, Bragi, and Hermod when the upperclassmen abandoned the plan. Baldr kills Vidar, Vala, Vali and Vor before facing Xehanort and Eraqus in a final battle. With help from Odin and Hoder's spirit, Xehanort kills Baldr, destroying his Darkness in the process. As they mourn their friends, Odin decides to retire, planning to make Xehanort and Eraqus his successors. Unbeknownst to them, Bragi is alive, having secretly been possessed by Luxu, and decides to keep watch over Xehanort.

One year later, Xehanort meets the Master of Masters while preparing for his Mark of Mastery exam. (Note: As depicted in Kingdom Hearts III Re Mind (2019).) Their conversation, combined with his own observations over the following six years, leads Xehanort to believe that darkness lives in every heart, and that there must be balance between light and darkness to maintain the worlds' order. Eraqus rebukes him, believing only in the purity of light, and the two go their separate ways. Xehanort spends the next six decades studying darkness, eventually reconnecting with Eraqus when he leaves his student Ventus in Eraqus's care after extracting the True Darkness from Ventus's heart, which becomes Vanitas. (Note: As depicted in Kingdom Hearts Birth by Sleep (2010).)

== Development and release ==
Prior to Kingdom Hearts Dark Road, series producer Tetsuya Nomura had expressed interest in making a game about Xehanort's past, but shelved the idea due to it not fitting in with the Kingdom Hearts development team's desires. Nomura later decided to revisit the concept when he was approached by the Union χ team about creating another game with a new protagonist. Several of the new characters introduced in Dark Road were given names based on Norse mythology.

The game was first announced in January 2020, initially under the working title Project Xehanort, being developed by the same team working on Union χ. It was later clarified that Dark Road would be a standalone game accessed within Union χ and that the app would be rebranded as Kingdom Hearts Union χ Dark Road upon Dark Road's release. Players would be able to access Dark Road without needing to meet certain criteria within Union χ and would have the ability to link the two games, earning free currency when they first start Dark Road based on their progress in Union χ. While initially planned to launch in early 2020, the game was later delayed for unspecified reasons, with some outlets speculating it to be the result of development complications from the COVID-19 pandemic. Dark Road was released worldwide on June 22, 2020 as part of Union χ's version 4.0.0 update.

On February 25, 2021, Square Enix announced that the app would be reaching its end of service in April of that year for the Japan server, and May for the global servers; this end of service was later delayed until June 17. While Dark Road was rendered unplayable after that date, Square Enix confirmed a subsequent version 5.0.0 update in September 2021 would add the remaining story chapters and allow the game to be played in its entirety offline, removing microtransactions and carrying over existing users' progress. Following several delays due to the amount of story content being added, the 5.0.0 update was released on August 26, 2022.

The app was delisted from all digital storefronts in August 2024. In September 2026, a fan developer released an unofficial browser-based port of the offline version. The port adds minor quality of life changes, including the ability to adjust the speed of gameplay and give the player unlimited BP.

== Reception ==
Reviews of Dark Road praised the game's story, but criticized the simplicity of the gameplay. Satoshi Kondo of 4Gamer found the rate of progression to be reasonable, though he acknowledged some players may find it lacking. Famitsu appreciated the game's simple nature, noting that fans would not have difficulty keeping up with playing both Union χ and Dark Road. Stacey Henley of NME felt there was no incentive to actually play the game, rather than activate the auto battle function and let the game play itself. Reviewing the offline version, Sorrel Kerr-Nung of Destructoid felt Dark Road had one of the best stories in the series, but claimed that due to the auto battle system and removal of microtransactions, the game "used to be a game about one thing (spending money) and now it is a game about nothing."
