= Kingdom Hearts χ =

2013 role-playing browser game

- Developers: Square Enix; Success; BitGroove
- Publisher: Square Enix
- Directors: Tetsuya Nomura; Hiroyuki Itou; Satoru Imai; Hisazumi Arai
- Producer: Hironori Okayama
- Designers: Masahiro Ishihara; Yu Suzuki; Haruki Nakano
- Programmer: Takahiro Hojo
- Artists: Tatsuya Kando; Takeshi Nagata; Akihito Nonami
- Writers: Masaru Oka; Tetsuya Nomura
- Composers: Yoko Shimomura; Tsuyoshi Sekito
- Series: Kingdom Hearts
- Platforms: Web browser; Android; iOS; Fire OS
- Release: Web browser: JP: July 18, 2013; Android, iOS: JP: September 3, 2015; NA: April 7, 2016; PAL: June 16, 2016; Fire OS: WW: January 29, 2019
- Genre: Role-playing
- Modes: Single-player, multiplayer

Kingdom Hearts χ, (Note: Japanese: キングダム ハーツ キー, Hepburn: Kingudamu Hātsu Kī) stylized as Kingdom Hearts χ[chi], was a Japanese role-playing browser game developed by Square Enix (in collaboration with Disney Interactive Studios), Success, and BitGroove, and published by Square Enix for web browsers as the eighth installment in the Kingdom Hearts series. Gameplay involved players navigating a customized avatar through Disney-inspired worlds fighting enemies, along with taking down bosses in multiplayer matches in competition with other teams. The browser game was launched in July 2013 and shut down in September 2016.

A version of the game for mobile devices called Kingdom Hearts Unchained χ was released as the ninth installment of the series in Japan in September 2015, and worldwide in 2016. In April 2017, Unchained χ was rebranded as Kingdom Hearts Union χ[Cross]. It was rebranded once again in June 2020 to Kingdom Hearts Union χ Dark Road with the release of the standalone game Kingdom Hearts Dark Road, accessed within Union χ. It was announced in February 2021 that Kingdom Hearts Union χ Dark Road would be shutting down its online features and transitioning into an offline app in May 2021. In August 2024, the game was delisted from all app stores.

Kingdom Hearts χ is a prequel to the Kingdom Hearts series as a whole, taking place centuries prior. It takes place before the Keyblade War, which established the organization of the Kingdom Hearts universe as of the original game. The player assumes the role of a Keyblade wielder who joins one of five factions led by Keyblade Masters fighting for control of the limited light existing in the world. Union χ acts as a sequel, retelling part of the story of Kingdom Hearts χ before diverging and telling a new story set after its events. The game's plot is connected to Kingdom Hearts III. The title refers to the χ-blade, a weapon central to the series' story arc.

The game was designed as a playing experience that could attract newcomers to the series. Its presentation was compared to that of a fairy tale, as depicting the usual style of the series would have been difficult on the platform. Tetsuya Nomura and Yoko Shimomura, veterans from the main series, returned as director and composer respectively. The game received favorable reception from critics. A companion film, Kingdom Hearts χ Back Cover, was released as part of Kingdom Hearts HD 2.8 Final Chapter Prologue in January 2017.

== Gameplay ==
A player character fighting a Heartless Raid Boss in Kingdom Hearts Union χ

Kingdom Hearts χ was a role-playing video game set in the universe of Kingdom Hearts which includes original characters and locations as well as ones from Disney and Final Fantasy media properties. Before beginning, players created their own character. Players could customize the gender, hair, and clothing, and choose accessories themed after both Square Enix and Disney universes present in the Kingdom Hearts series. Story missions were unlocked by the player. After a certain amount of the available content had been completed, new story missions became available. Players navigated their surroundings by dragging their cursor across the screen. Players navigated different worlds, defeating monsters known as the Heartless. The base game was free to play, with optional microtransactions. Actions used up AP, which could be replenished by either waiting or by using potions, which could be earned or bought. Rare items such as special cards could also be purchased. Alongside the single-player mode, there was a multiplayer mode where teams of players take on Raid Bosses, gigantic Heartless with high HP.

Enemies would appear on-screen, and could be engaged by clicking on them. During the player's turn, three cards would be randomly drawn from a deck of nine, each resulting in an attack. If the cards' combined strength and attached skills were insufficient to exhaust the enemy's HP, the heartless would counterattack. If the player survived this attack, or continued by spending additional AP, a new turn would begin. Upon defeating an enemy, the player would earn Lux (which unlocked rewards as it accumulates, but resets weekly), experience points (through which the player advanced in level), and Munny (an in-game currency). The player would also earn Fragments, cards based on the characters original to the Kingdom Hearts series and those from Disney and Final Fantasy franchises: the fragments were imbued with different properties depending on the character, such as physical or elemental strikes. Players could level up their cards to improve their attack and defense. Players could strengthen their Keyblade using materials found in each world, and new Keyblades were acquired as the story progresses. Each strengthened different types of cards; for example, Starlight was an all-around Keyblade offering boosts for Power-, Speed- and Magic-type cards, while the Snow White-inspired Treasure Trove was Power-type focused.

The mobile version of the game, entitled Kingdom Hearts Union χ, shared multiple gameplay features with its browser counterpart: the main exception is that this version was tailored for a touch screen. The ability to travel freely between different Disney worlds was also replaced with a stage system. These stages, called quests, were confined to specific areas of specific worlds. Instead of spending AP on individual actions, the player would spend AP to start a quest, and they could attack as many enemies, collect as many materials, and open as many chests as they could find before defeating a target Heartless. If the player's HP was fully depleted, a choice would be offered between forfeiting all progress in the quest or continuing to fight by spending Jewels, a new general-purpose in-game currency. Lux was considered another name for character-leveling experience points. Clothing, hair, and accessories could be obtained through Avatar Boards, which each contained an array of nodes on branching pathways. These nodes would be unlocked, in set sequences, with Avatar Coins, and could also yield such benefits as increased limits for AP and HP. Cards from the browser version were replaced by Medals, which were no longer drawn randomly in battle. Instead, each equipped Medal would be presented one at a time, and the player would be given the choice of attacking one enemy, attacking all enemies (dealing less damage), or using the special attack granted by the Medal (provided the Keyblade's special attack gauges are sufficiently filled). Medals could be combined with matching Medals to improve their special attacks. An update in April 2017 added multiplayer matchmaking for up to six players, and a theater mode to replay cutscenes.

== Synopsis ==
=== Setting ===
Kingdom Hearts χ is set in a world called Daybreak Town, hundreds of years prior to the other games in the series. The game begins before the Keyblade War, a conflict sparked due to disputes between Keyblade wielders over the light that created the world, triggering a calamity that reshaped the world into that seen in the rest of the Kingdom Hearts series. Prior to the war, a precognizant Keyblade Master known only as the Master of Masters bestows a Book of Prophecies to five of his six apprentices, the Foretellers, before disappearing. The book manifests objects and people from the future, and contains an account of future events, from which the Foretellers learn of the world's prophesied destruction. To prevent this, the Foretellers use their books to project distant worlds and defeat the Heartless infesting them to gather pieces of light, called Lux. Each Foreteller leads their own "Union" themed around their individual animal icon: Unicornis, governed by Ira; Anguis, governed by Invi; Leopardus, governed by Gula; Vulpes, governed by Ava; and Ursus, governed by Aced. The player character, a newly awakened Keyblade wielder, chooses to support one of the Unions and works to ensure the chosen faction's supremacy. The projected worlds include several locations introduced in previous series entries: Dwarf Woodlands (based on Snow White and the Seven Dwarfs), Agrabah (Aladdin), Wonderland (Alice in Wonderland), Olympus Coliseum (Hercules), and Beast's Castle (Beauty and the Beast).

Kingdom Hearts Union χ takes place shortly after the events of Kingdom Hearts χ in an alternate data worldline, with the player reliving the past to forget the events of the Keyblade War. Due to the book's loss of power without the Master or Foretellers present, the Keyblade wielders instead visit simulated datascapes based on the various Disney worlds. The game initially repeats the story of the original, dubbed Unchained χ, but diverges partway through the narrative in a new narrative titled Union χ. New stories feature the player forming a new team with four other Keyblade wielders, who become friends, while a new set of Union leaders must contend with new formless, sentient incarnations of True Darkness. Other major story events that do not involve the player were delivered via game updates, serving to expand on the story of Kingdom Hearts χ and continue the narrative. All of the worlds from Kingdom Hearts χ reappear, alongside returning worlds Castle of Dreams (Cinderella) and Enchanted Dominion (Sleeping Beauty). The game also introduces four new worlds themed around Wreck-It Ralph: Game Central Station, Niceland, Cy-Bug Sector, and Candy Kingdom.

The events of both games are told in a non-linear order; they are presented below chronologically.

=== Kingdom Hearts χ ===
The player character receives a Keyblade and is given a choice of joining one of five Unions, after which a spirit called a Chirithy explains the player's role of destroying Heartless to collect Lux. Under their Chirithy's direction, the player visits projections of other worlds to carry out their mission. As they continue, Chirithy explains that the Foretellers have learned from the Book of Prophecies about a great battle in which the world will be consumed by darkness. To save the future, the Foretellers use the book's powers to project the future into their era, hoarding Lux to protect the world's light.

The player befriends Ephemer, a Keyblade wielder from a rival Union who wishes to explore the Foretellers' tower in the center of town. The player agrees to help, but Ephemer disappears shortly thereafter. Later, the player meets another wielder from Ephemer's Union named Skuld, who is investigating his disappearance. Exploring the tower, the player and Skuld are caught by Ava, (Note: Ava disguises herself as Ira if the player has chosen the Vulpes Union. If any other Union is chosen, she disguises herself as that Union's leader.) who challenges them to a duel. Upon her defeat, Ava reveals that she has recruited Ephemer into the Dandelions, a group of Keyblade wielders intended to be kept out of the impending war so they may rebuild the world in its aftermath. Ava offers the same invitation to Skuld and the player; Skuld accepts, but the player is uncertain. As time passes, other wielders accuse one another of stealing Lux, and the Foretellers – suspecting one among themselves to be a traitor – begin rallying more wielders to their Unions to bolster their forces for the war.

Seeking a solution, the player, Skuld, and Chirithy find Gula, who believes the only one who can stop the war is the now missing Master of Masters. Ava tracks down the Master's sixth apprentice, Luxu, who vanished to watch the war unfold as per the Master's instructions; when Luxu reveals the true nature of the traitor, Ava attacks him, starting the war as prophesied. Skuld returns to the Dandelions while the player participates in the war alone, battling for as long as they can before collapsing in exhaustion. The war ends with the player as the sole survivor, reuniting with Chirithy, Skuld, and Ephemer before losing consciousness. Sometime later, Chirithy awakens the player and lies to them that the events surrounding the war were all a dream. Unbeknownst to them, Maleficent appears nearby – having traveled back in time after being defeated by Sora and his friends (Note: As depicted in Kingdom Hearts (2002)) – and makes plans to conquer her world in the past.

=== Kingdom Hearts Union χ ===
Prior to the Keyblade War, the Master of Masters gives Ava a list of five Keyblade wielders who are to become the new Union leaders; against his orders, she gives a Book of Prophecies to one of them, Brain. Strelitzia, another of the new leaders, attempts to convince the player to join the Dandelions, but she is ambushed and killed by an unknown figure. The Master entrusts Luxu with his Keyblade and a black box, which he instructs him to never open, revealing his plan to end a greater war against thirteen willful embodiments of True Darkness by using his apprentices and the new Union leaders as vessels to contain them. The Master plans to travel into the future and escape into a fictional world with Luxu's help.

After the war, the Dandelions reside in a data simulation of Daybreak Town, with all but the Union leaders made to forget what had happened. To prevent another war, the five new Union leaders – Ephemer, Skuld, Ventus, Brain, and Strelitzia's older brother Lauriam – agree to keep the world's destruction a secret and form a single Union, Union Cross. Meanwhile, Maleficent encounters a Darkness, who explains the virtual nature of the world she is in. Fearing the damage Maleficent could cause with her knowledge of the future, the Darkness instructs her to use a "lifeboat" pod within the Foretellers' tower to return to the real world.

Lauriam and the Dandelion Elrena investigate Strelitzia's disappearance before confronting Maleficent in the tower. Maleficent defeats Lauriam and escapes, but the lifeboat is damaged during the fight. Upon returning to the real world, Maleficent uses another pod to return to the future. (Note: As depicted in Kingdom Hearts II (2005)) Meanwhile, a malfunction causes the datascape to display afterimages of events from before the war. While searching the Book of Prophecies for a solution, Brain finds the Master's list and discovers that Ventus is not one of the intended Union leaders. Suspecting that Ventus had replaced Strelitzia, the group learns that a Darkness possessed Ventus and killed Strelitzia to sow discord between the leaders.

The Darkness within Ventus emerges and reveals that Maleficent's use of the lifeboat has triggered a failsafe meant to shut down the datascape with the Darkness trapped inside. Ventus absorbs and binds the Darkness within himself to stop it from attacking. Brain, Lauriam, Ventus, and Elrena use the remaining pods to return to the real world; Ephemer, Skuld, and the player stay behind and protect the Dandelions until they can all be rescued. They are confronted by four Darknesses, but the player pretends to be possessed by one of them and attacks Ephemer and Skuld, who are forced to seal the player and the other Darknesses in the datascape.

In the real world, a Darkness encounters Luxu, who places a white-cloaked figure into the lifeboat and sends it into the future. Later, the escaped Keyblade wielders use the pods to reach the future, but Brain stays behind and meets Luxu. Daybreak Town is destroyed, and the remaining Dandelions' Chirithies become Dream Eaters to protect their hearts. The player instead chooses to be reborn in a new vessel; many years later, they become Xehanort's mentor before dying. (Note: As depicted in Kingdom Hearts Dark Road (2020)) The surviving Keyblade wielders each emerge in different time periods, though Skuld is unaccounted for. Later, Brain awakens in Scala ad Caelum, a town founded by Ephemer on the ruins of Daybreak Town.

== Development ==
Kingdom Hearts χ was co-directed by Tetsuya Nomura, one of the series' creators, and Tatsuya Kando, who had previously directed Nintendo DS game The World Ends with You. The game's music was composed by Yoko Shimomura, a regular contributor to the series' music. The game was co-developed by Square Enix and Japanese studio Success Corporation. Square Enix originally handled the planning and design itself, but due to their developers' inexperience with creating browser games, development was transferred to the Success Corporation, who were familiar with the process. Despite multiplayer elements being included, the game was "fundamentally single-player", as with most other entries in the series. Chirithy, the player characters' companion, was designed around the concept of a supportive yet unobtrusive guide. Nomura based the character's design on the Scottish Fold domestic cat.

Due to difficulties that arose adapting the core Kingdom Hearts experience into a browser game, the presentation was designed in a similar style of fantasy classics of the locations encountered previously by series protagonists Sora and Riku. And because the game was to be played with a mouse instead of a game controller, the gameplay focus became simple controls and "flashy" battles. In an interview, Nomura stated that the work on developing Kingdom Hearts χ was paused for a time so developers could work on Kingdom Hearts III. He also stated that at the time they were exploring ways to allow more fans of the series to experience the game. The stories of Kingdom Hearts χ and Kingdom Hearts III were written at the same time, and thus share a strong connection. Despite this strong link, it was described by Tetsuya Nomura as a title where story was not the focus, and that its content was completely separate from the main series, making it accessible for newcomers. The game's title refers to the χ-blade (chi-blade), the original Keyblade and a weapon central to the Kingdom Hearts storyline.

The creation of a mobile version of the game was decided upon while the browser version was still being developed. Nomura initially planned to release both titles simultaneously, with each being updated individually. However, as development went on, the team's efforts became focused on finishing Kingdom Hearts χ, and development on Unchained was halted. The original plan was to make the game a simpler version of its browser counterpart, but with the increasing specs of mobile devices, the workload increased, contributing to the halt to development. As mobile devices employ a different control set-up to web browsers, Unchained could not work simply as a port of Kingdom Hearts χ. Its title "Unchained" signified the gameplay and story of Kingdom Hearts χ being released into a mobile format. One of the changes instituted during the games mobile remake was to make the gameplay more "casual" than Kingdom Hearts χ, with battles being shorter and potentially easier.

In March 2017, ahead of the first anniversary of the North American launch of Unchained χ, Square Enix announced that the game would be renamed Kingdom Hearts Union χ[Cross] the following month, to coincide with the addition of Union Cross multiplayer mode. In September 2018, a series of special "Classic Kingdom" minigames was added to Union χ; by completing certain objectives in these minigames, players were able to get early access to the "Starlight" Keyblade in Kingdom Hearts III.

== Release ==
The game was first announced at the Tokyo Game Show on September 20, 2012 alongside Kingdom Hearts HD 1.5 Remix under the tentative title Kingdom Hearts for PC Browsers. Its official title was announced in February the following year. To promote the game, codes for special items and in-game currency were included with first-print copies of Kingdom Hearts HD 1.5 Remix. A closed beta for the title began on March 22, 2013, with Beta recruitment beginning on March 13. The test was available for users who had a Yahoo Japan ID, and included in-game items and currency as a starting gift. An open beta test began on July 9, 2013, and the game's official service began on July 18 of the same year. Since the original release, the game received constant updates to its story missions, providing additional content to players. In April 2016, Square Enix announced that the browser game would be discontinued in September 2016.

Disney Interactive Studios was forced to delay a western localization of the game when the game's publisher Playdom, a social game network owned by Disney, was shut down. Despite this, planning continued for a western release with playtesting taking place to improve upon the game before launch. The western localization was revealed to the public with the title Kingdom Hearts Unchained X at the 2015 Electronic Entertainment Expo. Unchained χ was released in Japan on September 3, 2015, in North America on April 7, 2016, and in Europe on June 16, 2016. Union χ became available on the Amazon Appstore for Amazon devices on January 29, 2019.

In June 2020, the app was rebranded as Kingdom Hearts Union χ Dark Road, with the new mobile game Kingdom Hearts Dark Road added as a standalone game accessible from within the app. Players would receive additional currency when starting Dark Road based on their progress in Union χ.

On February 25, 2021, Square Enix announced that the game would be reaching its end of service in April of that year for the Japan server, and May for the global servers; this end of service was later delayed until June 17 for Japan, and June 30 for the global servers. The end of service came with an update to the game allowing players to view all the game's cutscenes offline in theater mode. An update converting Dark Road to an offline game and concluding its story was released in August 2022.

The app was delisted from all digital storefronts in August 2024. In September 2026, a fan developer released an unofficial browser-based port of the offline version.

=== Back Cover ===
In September 2015, Square Enix announced a new game titled Kingdom Hearts HD 2.8 Final Chapter Prologue. The collection features Kingdom Hearts χ Back Cover, a 60-minute cinematic film that retells the events of Kingdom Hearts χ from the perspective of the Foretellers, elaborating on their actions and their attempts to determine who is the traitor among them. It was released in January 2017.

== Reception ==
Reception

Aggregate score
Aggregator	Score
Metacritic	iOS: 70/100

Review score
Publication	Score
TouchArcade	iOS: 3/5

By September 2013, 200,000 users were announced to have enrolled for the game. During the 2013 WebMoney Awards, Kingdom Hearts χ was among the games voted into the "Best Rookie of the Year Good Games" category, with most voters praising the game for being accessible to series newcomers, and fun to play. Richard Eisenbeis of Kotaku was generally positive, saying that despite it being similar to other Japanese browser games and using a micro-transaction system, it was "an enjoyable little time waster."

Unchained was also well received, with Metacritic giving the game a score of 70 out of 100 based on 5 reviews. The A.V. Club praised the game for being a true Kingdom Hearts title despite its free to play format. TouchArcade gave the game three out of five stars, praising the music and graphics while calling the gameplay shallow with an overcomplicated user interface. Gamezebo called the title "better than expected", citing the game's fun but simple combat and extensive character customization but critiquing the game's dialogue for being cheesy and the story for being weaker than the console Kingdom Hearts titles. In the month after it was released, the mobile version was downloaded over two million times.
