= List of manhwa =

The following is a list of manhwa (Korean: 대한민국의 만화 목록; Korean comics) that have been licensed for translation into English.

== List ==
English title	Korean title	Creator	Licensor	Ref.
0/6 (Zero/Six)	가물치傳	Lee You-jung	Net Comics	
4 Cut Hero	4컷용사	Gojira-kun	Lezhin Comics	
4 Week Lovers	4주 애인	Maroron	Lezhin, Manta	
7Fates:Chakho		HYBE, BTS	WEBTOON	
8mm	8미리	You Na	DramaQueen	
9 Faces of Love	사랑에 관한 7가지 이야기	Wann	Net Comics	
11th Cat	열한번째 고양이	Kim Mi-kyung	Yen Press	
13th Boy	열세번째 남자	SangEun Lee	Yen Press	
50 Rules for Teenagers	10대에 하지 않으면 안 될 50가지	Na Ye-ri	ADV Manga	
100% Perfect Girl	100%의 그녀	Wann	Net Comics	
A Business Proposal	사내맞선	Haehwa (story), NARAK (art)	Tapas	
A Kiss for my Prince	왕자님에게 Kiss를	Kim Hee-eun	Infinity Studios	
A Returner's Magic Should Be Special	귀환자의 마법은 특별해야 합니다	Yu So-nan (story), Uk-jakga (art)	Tappytoon	
Ability	어빌리티	Son Jae Ho	WEBTOON	
The Abandoned Empress	버림 받은 황비	Jeong Yuna (story), iNA (art)	Tappytoon, Yen Press	
Act Like You Love Me!	순정말고 순종	Xuann	WEBTOON	
Adrenalin	아드레날린	Lee Jung-hwa	Infinity Studios	
Aegis	이지스 - 신의 방패	Yoo Jin-ha	Net Comics	
Aflame Inferno	불꽃의 인페르노	Lim Dall-young (story), Kim Kwang Hyun (art)		
Almost Highly Classified		JTK	Net Comics	
Angel Cup	엔젤컵	Youn Jae-ho (story), Kim Dong-wook (art)	Tokyopop	
Angel Diary	천행기	Kara (art)	Yen Press	
Angel Shop	엔젤 샵-ANGEL SHOP	Hwang Sook-ji	Central Park Media	
Animal Paradise	애니멀 파라다이스	Yu Sue-mi Korean: 유수미	Infinity Studios	
Another Typical Fantasy Romance	아무튼 로판 맞습니다	WOLHET	Pocket Comics	
Arcana	아르카나	Lee So-young	Tokyopop	
ArchLord		Park Jin-hwan	Tokyopop	
Ark Angels	아크엔젤	Park Sang-sun	Tokyopop	
The Archmage’s Restaurant	어느 마법사의 식당	Studio Inus	WEBTOON	
Armageddon	아마게돈	Se Lee-hyun	Central Park Media	
The Antique Gift Shop	분녀네 선물가게	Lee Eun	Yen Press	
Aron's Absurd Armada	아론의 무적함대	MiSun Kim	Yen Plus	
Aspirin	아스피린	Kim Eun-jeong	Tokyopop	
Audition	오디션	Chon Kye-young	DramaQueen	
Bambi	밤비	Park Young-ha	Infinity Studios	
Banya: The Explosive Delivery Man	폭주배달부 반야	Kim Young-oh	Dark Horse Comics	
Beauty and the Brawn	나만 보면 살랑살랑	Magic mangnani XXL	Tapas	
Bird Kiss	버드 키스	Park Eun-ah	Tokyopop	
Blade of Heaven	소마신화전기	Hwang Yong-su (story), Yang Kyung-il (art)	Tokyopop	
Blazin' Barrels	웨스턴샷건	Park Min-seo	Tokyopop	
The Boss	짱	Lim Jae-won	ADV Manga	
Boy Princess		Kim Se-young	Net Comics	
The Boxer	더 복서	story and art by H	WEBTOON	
Bride of the Water God	하백의 신부	Yun Mi-kyung	Dark Horse Comics	
Bring It On!	건강합니다!	Baek Hye-kyung	Yen Press	
Café Occult	카페 오컬트	Oh Rhe Bar Ghun (story), Ahn No-uhn (art)	Infinity Studios	
Can't Lose You	세상과도 바꿀 수 없어!	Wann	Net Comics	
Cherry Blossoms After Winter	겨울 지나 벚꽃	Bamwoo	Tappytoon	
Chocolat	浓情巧克力	Shin Ji-sang, Geo	Yen Press	
Chonchu: The Genocide Fiend	천추	Kim Sung-jaee (story), Kim Byung-jin (art)	Dark Horse Comics	
Chronicles of the Cursed Sword	파검기	Yeo Beop-ryong (story), Park Hui-jin (art)	Tokyopop	
Chronicles of the Grim Peddler	아기장수 이야기	Lee Joung-a	UDON	
Chrono Code	리버사이드	Shin Eui-chul (story), Choi Il-ho (art)	Tokyopop	
Cheollang Yeoljeon	천랑열전	Park Sung-woo	Infinity Studios	
Click	CLiCK 클릭	Lee Young-ran	Net Comics	
Comic		Ha Si-hyun	Yen Press	
Couple		Jae Sung Park (story), Sung Jae Park (art)	Central Park Media	
Crazy Love Story	크레이지 러브스토리	Lee Vin	Tokyopop	
Croquis Pop	크로키팝	Seo Kwang-hyun (story), Ko Jin-ho (art)	Yen Press	
Cynical Orange	시니컬 오렌지	Yun Ji-un	Yen Press	
Dark Moon: The Blood Altar	DARK MOON: 달의 제단	HYBE, Enhypen	WEBTOON	
Daring Students' Association	위태위태 학생회	Cha Min-yi	UDON	
Daughter of the Emperor	황제의 외동딸	Yunsul (story), Rino (art)	Tappytoon	
Damn Reincarnation	빌어먹을 환생	Kiki (키키)	Tapas	
Dear Waltz	디어 왈츠	Yun Ji-un	UDON	
Deja Vu	데자부	Youn In-wan Yoon In-Wan (Story), Yoon Seung-Ki (Art), Yang Kyung-il (Art), Lee Vin (Art), Park Sung-Woo (Art), Kim Tae-Hyung (Art), Byun Byung Jun (Art)	Tokyopop	
Demon Diary	마왕일기	Lee Chi-hyong (story), Lee Yun-hee (story), Kara (art)	Tokyopop	
The Demon Queen Has a Death Wish	마왕님은 죽고 싶어	Gaejuk	Manta	
Denma	덴마	Yang Yeong-Soon	WEBTOON	
Devil's Bride	악마의 신부	Kim Se-young	Tokyopop	
The Devil's Trill	아름다운 사냥	Won Son-yeon	Net Comics	
Die, Please!	부탁이니 죽어주라	Euntae	Manta	
Daytime Star	낮에 뜨는 별	Chaeun, Godago	LINE Webtoon	
Do Whatever You Want	네 멋대로 해라	Na Ye-ri	Net Comics	
Doctor Elise: The Royal Lady With the Lamp	외과의사 엘리제	Yuin, mini	Tappytoon	
Doctor’s Rebirth	의원, 다시 살다	Taesun (태선)	Tapas	
Dokebi Bride	도깨비 신부	Marley	Net Comics	
Dorothy of Oz	도로시	Son Hee-joon	UDON	
Dragon Devouring Mage	용을 삼킨 마법사	람우	tapas	
Dragon Hunter	용잡이	Hong Seock-seo	Tokyopop	
The Druid of Seoul Station	서울역 드루이드	Mun sung ho, Jin Seol woo, liveBear (Art)	WEBTOON	
DVD	디비디	Chon Kye-young	DramaQueen	
Emperor's Castle	황제의 성	Kim Sung-mo	Net Comics	
Eleceed	일렉시드	Jeho Son(story), ZHENA(art)	Line Webtoon, Inklore	
Existence	존재	Kwang jin, Kim Kyeong-jun	Tapas	
Eternity	이터너티	Park Jin-ryong (story), Shin Yong-gwan (art)	Tokyopop	
Ending Maker	엔딩메이커	Chwiryong (story), DOES (art)	Tapas	
Evil's Return	천지인	Lee Jong-kyu (story), Shin Hwan (art)	Tokyopop	
Evyione: Ocean Fantasy	에뷔오네	Kim Young-hee	UDON	
Faeries' Landing	선녀 강림	Hyun You	Tokyopop	
Fantamir	판타미르	Seo Eun-jin	Tokyopop	
Fantasy Land	게임 이시영	Kim Si-young	ADV Manga	
Fever	FEVƎR (피버)	Park Hee-jung	Tokyopop	
Fighting!! Guidance	파이팅!! 선도부	Jeon Keuk-jin (story), and Eom Hye-jin (art)	Infinity Studios	
For Your Murder	당신의 살인을 위하여	Seyoon (story), Jink (art)	WEBTOON	
Forest of Gray City	잿빛 도시숲을 달리다	Uhm Jung-hyun	Yen Press	
From a Knight to a Lady	그 기사가 레이디로 사는 법!	Hyerim Sung, Ink. (Art)	WEBTOON	
Forget About Love	애인발견	SangEun Lee	Tokyopop	
The Forgotten Princess Just Wants Peace	잊혀진 황녀는 평화롭게 살고 싶어	Lemon and Dulhana	Manta	
Freak: Legend of the Nonblonds	프리크	Yi Dong-eun and Chung Yu	Yen Press	
Full House	풀하우스	Woo Soo-yeon	Central Park Media	
Gadirok	가디록	Hwang Jeong-ho	ADV Manga	
The Gamer	더 게이머	Sung Sang-Young	WEBTOON	
Guest House	게스트 하우스	Ban-Jang HONG	Toptoon	
The Girl Downstairs	이두나!	MIN SONGA	WEBTOON	
Girls of the Wild's	소녀 더 와일즈	Hun	WEBTOON	
The God of High School	갓 오브 하이스쿨	Park Yong-Je	Line Webtoon	
Good Luck	굿럭	Kang E-jin	Tokyopop	
Goong	궁	Park So-hee	Yen Press	
Gosu	고수	Ryu Gi-un, Mun Jeong-hoo	WEBTOON	
The Great Catsby	위대한 캣츠비	Doha	Net Comics	
The Greatest Estate Developer	역대급 영지 설계사	Back-kyung (Story), Kim, Hyunsoo (Art)	Webtoon	
Hard Boiled Angel	블루엔젤	Lee Hung-se	Central Park Media	
Heaven Above Heaven		Hyun Kang-suk (story), Jeon Joong-won (art)	Tokyopop	
Heavenly Executioner Chiwoo	치우천하	Lee Ha-na (story), Park Kang-ho (art)	Yen Press	
Her Tale of Shim Chong	그녀의 심청	Seri (story), Biwan (art)	Random House	
Hissing	히싱	Kang EunYoung	Yen Press	
Home Plate Villain	홈 플레이트의 빌런	이블라인, Eveline(novel), Randomorder (Art)	KakaoPage	
Honey Mustard	허니 머스타드	Yeo Ho-kyung	Tokyopop	
Hotel Africa	호텔 아프리카	Park Hee-jung	Tokyopop	
Hotel California		JTK	Net Comics	
I Accept You	넌 내가 접수한다	Kwon Yeul Hee (story), Kwon Yeul Hee (art)	Qutie Comic	
I Became A Part Time Employee For Gods	신들의 알바나라	God Thingjak, Jeon Tae Hwan, Deany, Mir	Tapas	
I Dare You	쪽팔려게임	Bongsoo (story), dai (Art)	WEBTOON	
I Love Amy	나는 에이미를 사랑해	Unni	Yen Press	
I Wish...	아이 위시	Seo Hyun-Joo	Tokyopop	
I'm the Max-Level Newbie	나혼자만렙뉴비	WAN.Z (redice studio), Maslow, SWING BAT (Art)	WEBTOON	
I.N.V.U.		Kim Kang-won	Tokyopop	
iD eNTITY	유레카	Son Hee-joon (story), Kim Youn-kyung (art)	Tokyopop	
Id - The Greatest Fusion Fantasy	이드	Kim DaeWoo (Story) Kenny A.t. (Art)		
I-Doll		Choi Mi-ae	Tokyopop	
Immortal Regis	불멸의 레지스	Ga On-Bi	Ablaze Publishing	
In Dream World	인드림월드	Yoon Jae-ho	Tokyopop	
In the Starlight	별빛속에	Kang Kyung-ok	Net Comics	
The Indomitable Martial King	권왕전생	Lim Kyung-bae (novel), Nafundal, Yang Kyung-il	Tapas	
The Iron-Blooded Necromancer Has Returned	철혈의 네크로맨서가 귀환했다	Bisoo	Alandal	
Island	아일랜드	Youn In-wan (story), Yang Kyung-il (art)	Tokyopop	
Itaewon Class	이태원 클라쓰	Gwang Jin	WEBTOON, Ize Press	
Jack Frost	잭 프로스트	Go Jin-ho	Yen Press	
Jade of Bango	몽환백서	Yim Ae-ju (story), Yim Jin-ju (art)	Tokyopop	
June	유월	Lee Young-ran	Net Comics	
Karsearin: Adventures of a Red Dragon	카르세아린	Lim Kyung bae (novel), WM	WEBTOON	
Keep It A Secret From Your Mother	엄마한텐 비밀이야!	Nova	Toptoon	
Kill Me, Kiss Me	K2 -케이투-	Lee Young-you	Tokyopop	
Killing Stalking	킬링 스토킹	Koogi	Lezhin Comics, Seven Seas Entertainment	
Kill the Hero	킬더히어로	D-Dart	Tapas	
King of Hell	마제	Ra In-soo (story), Kim Jae-hwan (art)	Tokyopop	
The Knight Only Lives Today	오늘만 사는 기사	SOULPUNG (story), IAN (art)	Webtoon	
Knight Run	나이트런	Kim Sung-min	WEBTOON	
Kubera	쿠베라	Currygom (story), (art)		
Lady Devil	마귀	FUKI Choco and B. cenci	Manta, Ize Press	
The Lady And The Beast	그녀와 야수	Hongseul	Tappytoon	
Land of Silver Rain	은비가 내리는 나라	Lee Mi-ra	Net Comics	
Laon	라온	YoungBin Kim (story), Hyun You (art)	Yen Press	
Last Fantasy	라스트환타지	Creative Hon (story), Kwon Yong-wan (art)	Tokyopop	
Survival Story Of a Sword King In a Fantasy World	이계 검왕 생존기	Lim Kyung-bae (novel), Studio Chun (art)		
Legend	리젠드	Woo Soo-jung (story), Kara (art)	Yen Press	
The Legendary Moonlight Sculptor	달빛조각사	Do-gyeong LEE, Hui-seong NAM (Story), Tae-Hyung KIM, Grimza (Art)	Kross Komics	
Les Bijoux	레비쥬	Jo Eun-ha (story), Park Sang-sun (art)	Tokyopop	
Let Dai	Let 다이	W oon Soo-yeon	Net Comics	
Let's Be Perverts	변태가 되자	Lee You-jung	Net Comics	
Lie to Me	내게 거짓말을 해봐	Lee Young-ran	Net Comics	
Lights Out	어쩐지 좋은 일이 생길 것 같은 저녁	Lee Myung-jin	Tokyopop	
Like Mother, Like Daughter	똑 닮은 딸	YIDAHM	WEBTOON	
Like Wind on a Dry Branch	마른 가지에 바람처럼	Dalsaeowl (story), Hwaeum (art)	WEBTOON	
Little Queen	소녀왕	Kim Yeon-joo	Tokyopop	
Lookism (manhwa)	외모지상주의	Park Tae Joon	Daewon and Book, WEBTOON	
The Love Doctor	이성연애박사	Chamsae (Story), Bansook (Art)	Lezhin Comics	
Love or Money	콩깍지	SangEun Lee	Tokyopop	
Madtown Hospital	왕십리 종합병원	JTK	Net Comics	
Magical JxR	매지컬 JR	Lee Sun-young	UDON	
The Maid And The Vampire	하녀와 흡혈귀	JU Yujeong (story), LEE Seon (art)	WEBTOON	
Martin & John	마틴&존	Park Hee-jung	Tokyopop	
Masca	마스카	Kim Young-hee	Central Park Media	
Max Level Returner	나 혼자 만렙 귀환자	Anaziro, Honey, VERTWO	Tappytoon	
Milkyway Hitchhiking	은하수의 히치하이킹	Sirial	Yen Press	
The Missing White Dragon	하얀용의 실종	Park Young-ha	Infinity Studios	
Model	모델	Lee So-young	Tokyopop	
Moon Boy	月요일 소년	Lee Young-you	Yen Press	
My Boyfriend is a Vampire	내 남친은 뱀파이어	Han Yu-rang	Seven Seas Entertainment	
Mom, I'm Sorry	맘마미안	MiTi (story), GUGU (art)	WEBTOON	
Mythology of the Heavens	천국의신화	Lee Hyun-se	Central Park Media	
Nabi	나비	Kim Yeon-joo	Tokyopop (Nabi: The Prototype only)	
Nambul: War Stories	남벌	Lee Hyun-se	Central Park Media	
Narration of Love at 17	17세의 나레이션	Kang Kyung-ok	Net Comics	
Neck and Neck	막상막하	Lee Sun-hee	Tokyopop	
Night Shift in Another World	이세계 편돌이	Sadsnake, cooljamong	WEBTOON	
Noblesse	노블레스	Son Jae ho (story), Gwang su (art)	WEBTOON	
Noona Fan Dot Com	누나팬닷컴	Kim Sung-yeon	WEBTOON	
No Love Zone	연애제한구역	Danbi	Manta	
No More Princes	노 모어 프린스	Meelbaat (original webnovel), Mr. General Store (artist)	Pocket Comics	
Not So Bad	낫 소 배드	E-hae	Net Comics	
NOW	나우	Park Sung-woo	Infinity Studios	
Oath to Love and Passion	사랑과 정열에게 맹세!!	Hwang Sook-ji	Central Park Media	
Odd Girl Out	소녀의 세계	Morangji	WEBTOON	
Observing Elena Evoy	일레나 에보이 관찰 일지	Dorong and Myeongcho	Manta	
Omniscient Reader's Viewpoint	전지적 독자 시점	Sing Shong (story), SleepyC (art)	WEBTOON	
One		Vin Lee	Tokyopop	
One Fine Day	나나이랑 그루's One Fine Day	Sirial	Yen Press	
One Thousand and One Nights	천일야화	Jeon Jin-seok (story), Han Seung-he (art)	Yen Press	
Operation Liberate Men	남성해방 대작전	Lee Mi-ra	Net Comics	
Overgeared	템빨	Dong Wook Lee	Tapas	
Passionate Two-Face	열정의 투 페이스	Lee You-jung	Net Comics	
Peigenz	페이건즈	Park Sung-woo (art)	Infinity Studios	
Peppermint	페퍼민트	Seo Eun-jin	Tokyopop	
Perfect Half	퍼펙트 하프	Luv P	Lezhin Comics	
The Perks Of Being An S-Class Heroine	빙의자를 위한 특혜	Irinbi (story), Grrr (art)	Tapas, Ize Press	
Peter Panda	피터판다	Na Ye-ri	DramaQueen	
Phantom	팬텀	Lee Ki-hoon (story), Cho Seung-yup (art)	Tokyopop	
Positively Yours		Lee Jung, Kang Ki		
PhD: Phantasy Degree	마스터스쿨 올림프스	Son Hee-joon	Tokyopop	
Pig Bride	정체불명 새색시	Huh Kook-hwa (story), Kim Su-jin (art)	Yen Press	
Pine Kiss	파인키스	Lee Eun-hye	Net Comics	
Pink Lady	핑크레이디	Yeon-woo/Seo-na	Joongang	
Platina	플라티나	Kim Yeon-joo	Central Park Media	
Player Who Can't Level Up	레벨업 못하는 플레이어	GaVinGe (story), Parrot Kim (story), PARK Jungjae (art), Parrot Kim (art)	Tapas Media	
President Dad	소녀교육헌장	Rhim Ju-yeon	Tokyopop	
Priceless	봄봄	Lee Young-you	Tokyopop	
Priest	프리스트	Hyung Min-woo	Tokyopop	
Princess	프린세스	Han Seong-won	Central Park Media	
Planet Blood	레드블러드	Kim Tae-young	Tokyopop	
Promise	프라미스	Lee Eun-young	DramaQueen	
The Queen's Knight	여왕의 기사	Kim Kang-won	Tokyopop	
Quantum Mistake	체인지가이	Hong Eun-so (story), Choi Myung-soo (art)	ADV Manga	
Raiders	레이더스	Pak Jin-joon		
Ragnarok	라그나로크	Lee Myung-jin	Tokyopop	
Reading Club	독서클럽	Cho Ju-hee (story), Suh Yun-young (art)	UDON	
Real Lies	새빨간 거짓말	Lee Si-young	Yen Press	
The Reason Why Raeliana Ended Up at the Duke's Mansion	그녀가 공작저로 가야 했던 사정	Milcha (story), Gorae (art)	Tappytoon, Yen Press	
Reborn As a Scholar	학사재생	Yu Hyun So (소유현)	Tapas	
Reborn Rich	재벌집 막내아들	San Gyung	WEBTOON, Seven Seas Entertainment	
The Reborn Young Lord is an Assassin	회귀한 공작가의 막내도련님은 암살자	swingbat (story), Swing Bat (Art)	Webtoon	
Recast	리캐스트	Seung Hui-kye	Tokyopop	
Redrum 327	레드럼 327	Ko Ya-seong	Tokyopop	
Regarding Death	죽음에 관하여	Sini Hyeono	WEBTOON	
The Remarried Empress	재혼 황후	alphatart (story), sumpul (art)	WEBTOON	
The Regressed Demon Lord is Kind	회귀한 마왕은 착하게 산다	Hungry Panda (novel), Studio Inus (art)	KakaoPage	
Return Of Mount Hua Sect	화산귀환	Biga (비가)	WEBTOON	
The Return of the Disaster-Class Hero	재앙급 영웅님이 귀환하셨다	Sanji Jiksong (novel), BGman, HEATS	KakaoPage	
Rebirth	리버스	Lee Kang-woo	Tokyopop	
Rolling	롤링	Shin Ji-sang	Tokyopop	
Romance Papa	로맨스 파파	Lee Young-ran	Net Comics	
Roureville	루르빌	E-hae	Net Comics	
Return of the SSS-Class Ranker	SSS급 랭커 회귀하다	Gald, Hojun (novel), Rooty House (art)	KakaoPage	
Ruler of the Land	열혈강호 리마스터	Jun Kook-jin (story), Yang Jae-hyun (art)	ADV Manga	
Rure	루어	Seomoon Da-mi	Tokyopop	
Saint Marie	세인트 마리	Yang Yuh-jin	ADV Manga	
Sarasah	사라사	Ryu Ryang	Yen Press	
Sartai	살례탑	Roh Miyeng		
Saver	세이버	Lee Eun-young	Tokyopop	
The Star Seekers	별을 쫓는 소년들	HYBE, Tomorrow X Together	WEBTOON, Ize Press	
Seasons of Blossom	청춘 블라썸	Hongduck(author), Nemone(illustrator)		
Season of Change	느린 장마	AJS	Manta	
Second Life Ranker	두 번 사는 랭커	Do-yeon SA, Nong-Nong (Art)	KakaoPage	
Secret Class	비밀수업	Wang Chang Cheol, MinaChan	Day Comics	
Seduction More Beautiful Than Love	사랑보다 아름다운 유혹	Lee Hyeon-sook	Tokyopop	
Sex Stop-watch	섹톱워치	Serious	Toptoon	
Shaman Warrior	단구	Park Joong-ki	Dark Horse Comics	
Silent War	작은 전쟁	Tharchog (story), Yansae (art)	Day Comics	
SSS-Class Revival Hunter				
Sky Blade Sword of the Heavens	파천일검	Hyun Kang-suk (story), and Shin Ah (art)	ADV Manga	
So I Married the Anti-Fan	그래서 나는 안티팬과 결혼했다 (재림)	Kim Eun Jeong, Jaerim	WEBTOON	
Solo Leveling	나 혼자만 레벨업	Chu-Gong (story), Hyoen-Gun, Jang Sung-Rak (Illustrator)	Tappytoon	
Sora & Haena!	소라해나!	Jackbull	Random House	
Soul to Seoul	이스트 코스트	Kim Ji-eun	Tokyopop	
Soul Cartel	소울 카르텔	Kim Eun-hyo		
Snow Drop	스노우 드롭	Choi Kyung-ah	Tokyopop	
Star Project Chiro	치로	Baek Hye-kyung	UDON	
The Summit	절정	Lee Young-hee	DramaQueen	
Super Secret	슈퍼 시크릿	eon	WEBTOON	
Surviving the Game as a Barbarian	게임 속 바바리안으로 살아남기	Jung Yoon-kang (Story), Midnight Studio (Art)	Webtoon	
Sweet and Sensitive	다정다감	Park Eun-ah	ADV Manga	
Sweety	스위티	Park Jae-sung (story), Kim Ju-ri (art)	Infinity Studios	
The Tarot Café	타로카페	Park Sang-sun	Tokyopop	
Teenage Mercenary	입학용병	YC (story), Rakyeon (art)	WEBTOON	
Terminally-ill Genius Dark Knight	시한부 천재 암흑기사	Jung SeonYul (정선율)	WEBTOON	
Terrarium Adventure	테라리움 어드벤처	Suha Suha	Manta	
Terror Man	테러맨	Dongwoo Han	WEBTOON	
Threads of Time	살례탑	Noh Mi-young	Tokyopop	
There Are No Bad Heroes In This World	세상에 나쁜 용사는 없다	Ghost Tofu, Hanso	WEBTOON	
Totally Captivated	완전무결하게 사로잡히다	Yoo Ha-jin	Net Comics	
Tower of God	신의 탑	Lee Jong-hui	WEBTOON	
Tomb Raider King	도굴왕	Sanji jiksong (novel), 3B2S	KakaoPage	
Transmigrating to the Otherworld	이계진입 리로디드	Lim Kyung-bae (novel), Jiya		
True Beauty	여신강림	Yaongyi	WEBTOON	
Traveler of the Moon		Lee Na-hyeon	Infinity Studios	
Two Will Come	두 사람이다	Kang Kyung-ok	Net Comics	
The Ultimate Shut-In	집구석 절대자	Maeng ju-gyeong, Artwork by Bihyeon	Webtoon	
Unbalance Unbalance	언밸런스×2	Lim Dall-young (story), Lee Soo-hyun (art)	Infinity Studios	
Under the Glass Moon	유리달 아래서	Ko Ya-seong	Tokyopop	
Under the Oak Tree	상수리나무 아래	Kim Soo-ji, Namu (story), P (Illustrator)	Manta	
Unnie, I Like You!		Jeongussi	WEBTOON, Tokyopop	
Utopia's Avenger	홍길동 무림전사록	Oh Se-kwon	Tokyopop	
Villains Are Destined to Die	악역의 엔딩은 죽음뿐	Gwon Gyeoeul (story), SUOL (art)	Tapas	
Veritas	베리타스	Yoon Joon-sik (story), Kim Dong-hoon (art)		
Very! Very! Sweet	Very! Very! 다이스키	Shim Ji-sang (story), Geo (art)	Yen Press	
Visitor		No Yi-jung	Tokyopop	
Viral Hit				
Volcano High Prelude	화산고 Pre Story	Ahn Chul-jung	Dark Horse Comics	
The Wailing Perversion	울부짖는 역린	Jordan, gegegek	WEBTOON	
Wendy The Florist	웬디의 꽃집에 오지 마세요	Kim Ji Seo (story), Sizh (art)	WEBTOON	
What do u take me for?	동네 누나	Tharchog (story), kyun (art)	Day Comics	
What Does the Fox Say?	여우는 뭐라고 하는가?	Team Gaji	Yen Press	
What Happens In Rio	카니발 베이비	Neote, ReadPeachStudio	Tapas	
What's Wrong with Secretary Kim	김비서가 왜 그럴까	Jung Kyung-yoon (novel), Kim Myeongmi (Art)	Tappytoon	
Wedding Impossible	웨딩 임파서블	Song Jung-won (novel), Lee Chung (Art)	KakaoPage	
Witch Buster	위치헌터	Cho Jung-man	Seven Seas Entertainment	
Witch Class		Lee Ru	Infinity Studios	
Who Made Me a Princess	어느 날 공주가 되어버렸다	Plutus (story), Spoon (art)	Seven Seas Entertainment	
Why Are You Doing This, Shinseonnim?!	왜 이러세요, 신선님?!	Enyoti	Lezhin Comics	
The World After the Fall	멸망 이후의 세계	singNsong (original novel), S-Cynan (story), Undead Potato (art)	WEBTOON	
XS	XS엑세스	Song Ji-Hyoung	Dark Horse Comics	
Yodong's Vampire	요동의 뱀파이어 단	Lee You-jung	Net Comics	
Yongbi the Invincible	용비불패 완전판	Ryu Ki-woon (story), Moon Jung-who (art)	Central Park Media	
You're So Cool	넌 너무 멋져	Lee Young-hee	Yen Press	
Your Lover	그대의연인	Han Seung-won	Net Comics	
Your Throne	하루만 네가 되고 싶어	SAM	WEBTOON	
Yumi’s Cells	유미의 세포들	Lee Dong Gun	WEBTOON	
Zero	제로: 시작의 관	Lim Dall-young (story), Park Sung-woo (art)	Infinity Studios	
Zippy Ziggy	지피지기	Kim Eun-jung (story), Hwang Seung-man (art)	Infinity Studios	
