= Doctor Elise =

South Korean web novel

Doctor Elise: The Royal Lady with the Lamp
- Webtoon cover of Doctor Elise volume 1 featuring titular character Elise

외과의사 엘리제 RR: Oegwa uisa Ellije MR: Oekwa ŭisa Ellije
- Genre: Medical; Fantasy; Romance; Isekai
- Author: Yuin
- Illustrator: Mini
- Publisher: Kidari Studio (South Korea); Kadokawa Shoten (Japan)
- Webtoon service: KakaoPage (South Korea); Piccoma (Japan); Tappytoon (English); Lezhin Comics (English)
- Original run: September 18, 2017 – February 16, 2021
- Volumes: 10
- Anime television series
- Directed by: Kumiko Habara
- Written by: Deko Akao
- Music by: Ken Itō
- Studio: Maho Film
- Licensed by: Crunchyroll (streaming); SEA: Plus Media Networks Asia
- Original network: AT-X, Tokyo MX, BS NTV, Kansai TV
- Original run: January 10, 2024 – March 27, 2024
- Episodes: 12

Doctor Elise: The Royal Lady with the Lamp (Korean: 외과의사 엘리제) is a South Korean web novel written by Yuin. It was serialized in Kakao's KakaoPage service from December 2015 to April 2016. A webtoon adaptation illustrated by Mini was serialized in KakaoPage from September 2017 to February 2021. An anime television series adaptation produced by Maho Film aired from January to March 2024.

== Plot ==
Elise was an unpopular, spoiled, and hot-headed empress. After the people rebelled and she was executed, she reincarnated in the modern world with her memories intact. She studies and becomes an expert doctor to atone for her previous life. When she dies in a plane crash, she wakes up as Elise again, as a teenager. To avoid repeating her mistakes, she gained popularity by setting up medical reforms and other improvements and aimed to improve her relationship with her peers and the people.

== Characters ==
Elise (엘리제) / Song Ji-hyeon (송지현) / Aoi Takamoto (高本 葵, Takamoto Aoi)
Voiced by: Yui Ishikawa
Formerly a terrible ruler, Elise was double reincarnated in a closed loop between Earth and her native kingdom. Thanks to her medical knowledge from modern earth, she begins atonement by raising the health standards and survival rates.
Linden (린덴) / Ron (론)
Voiced by: Yōhei Azakami (Linden), Satoshi Hino (Ron)
The crown prince of the empire, who in Elise's first life had been her husband and executioner. As a member of the imperial family, he possesses some magical skill, such as changing his appearance to his blonde hair, blue eyes counterpart known as 'Ron'.
Graham (그라함)
Voiced by: Yoshimasa Hosoya
Elise's mentor when she interns at Teresa Hospital as an intern. Although he's strict with her and closed off, he eventually warms up to Elise when she helps him save the life of his only family left.
Lenne De Clorance (렌 드 클로랜스)
Voiced by: Daisuke Ono
Elise's eldest brother. He's the most skeptical of Elise's sudden change of heart.
Chris De Clorance (크리스 드 클로랜스)
Voiced by: Hiro Shimono
Elise's second eldest brother.
Michael De Romanoff (미하일 드 로마노프)
Voiced by: Soma Saito
Linden's younger half-brother and Julian's cousin. In the first timeline, Linden killed him during his revenge against the Childe family.
Julian De Childe (유리엔 드 차일드)
Voiced by: Megumi Han
Minchester De Romanoff (민체스터 드 로마노프)
Voiced by: Kazuhiko Inoue

== Media ==
=== Novel ===
Written by Yuin, Doctor Elise: The Royal Lady with the Lamp was serialized on Kakao's KakaoPage service from December 30, 2015, to April 27, 2016, and has been published in four volumes. A side story was released from May 4 to 30, 2016. A second side story was serialized from September 19 to November 27, 2017.

=== Webtoon ===
A webtoon adaptation illustrated by Mini was serialized in KakaoPage from September 18, 2017, to February 16, 2021; a 13-chapter side story was published from January 9 to April 9, 2024. FineToon has compiled the main chapters into ten volumes. The series is published digitally in English by Tappytoon and Lezhin Comics. In Japan, the webtoon has been released digitally on Kakao's Piccoma service and published in print by Kadokawa Shoten.

=== Anime ===
An anime television series adaptation was announced on February 28, 2023. It is produced by Maho Film and directed by Kumiko Habara, with scripts supervised by Deko Akao, character design by Yūko Watanabe, and music composed by Ken Itō. The series aired on AT-X and other networks from January 10 to March 27, 2024. The opening theme song is "Believer", performed by Yui Ishikawa, while the ending theme song is "Listen", performed by Maju Arai. Crunchyroll is streaming the series. Plus Media Networks Asia licensed the series for Southeast Asia.

==== Episodes ====
No.	Title (Note: All English titles are taken from Crunchyroll.)	Directed by	Written by	Storyboarded by	Original release date
1	"Atonement"; Transliteration: "Tsugunai" (Japanese: 償い)	Kumiko Habara	Deko Akao	Kumiko Habara	January 10, 2024
2	"A Gamble"; Transliteration: "Kake" (Japanese: 賭け)	Kyohei Oyabu	Deko Akao	Kumiko Habara	January 17, 2024
3	"The Lady Saint"; Transliteration: "Seijo" (Japanese: 聖女)	Yoshihisa Matsumoto	Maika Shizuhara	Yoshihisa Matsumoto	January 24, 2024
4	"Which Way the Wind Blows"; Transliteration: "Satsuzen" (Japanese: 颯然)	Katsumi Minokuchi	Sawako Hirabayashi	Kunihisa Sugishima	January 31, 2024
5	"Ordeal"; Transliteration: "Shiren" (Japanese: 試練)	Naoyoshi Kusaka	Toshima Hara	Dojagagen	February 7, 2024
6	"Daylight Fantasies, Nighttime Dreams"; Transliteration: "Chusouyamu" (Japanese: 昼想夜夢)	Hidetoshi Watanabe	Sawako Hirabayashi	Takeshi Mori	February 14, 2024
7	"Reminiscence"; Transliteration: "Tsuioku" (Japanese: 追憶)	Tomihiko Okubo	Toshima Hara	Takeshi Mori	February 21, 2024
8	"Days Long Ago"; Transliteration: "Sekijitsu" (Japanese: 昔日)	Yoshihisa Matsumoto	Maika Shizuhara	Yoshihisa Matsumoto	February 28, 2024
9	"After the Storm"; Transliteration: "Arashi no Ato" (Japanese: 嵐の後)	Naoyoshi Kusaka	Deko Akao	Dojagagen	March 6, 2024
10	"For a Brief While"; Transliteration: "Tamayura" (Japanese: 玉響)	Kyohei Oyabu	Sawako Hirabayashi	Takeshi Mori	March 13, 2024
11	"A Wish"; Transliteration: "Negai" (Japanese: 願い)	Katsumi Minokuchi	Deko Akao	Kumiko Habara & Takeshi Mori	March 20, 2024
12	"A Path"; Transliteration: "Michi" (Japanese: 道)	Naoyoshi Kusaka	Deko Akao	Kumiko Habara	March 27, 2024
