= Latna Saga: Survival of a Sword King =

South Korean web novel

이계 검왕 생존기 RR: Igye geomwang saengjongi MR: Igye kŏmwang saengjon'gi
- Genre: Adventure, isekai
- Author: Kyungbae Lim
- Illustrator: Soon-Q Kwon
- Webtoon service: KakaoPage (South Korea); Piccoma (Japan); Tapas (English)
- Original run: December 31, 2019
- Anime
- Studio: Studio Pierrot; Red Dog Culture House

Latna Saga: The Survival Sword King (Korean: 이계 검왕 생존기, romanized: Igye Geom-Wang Saengjongi, Japanese: 異世界剣王生存記, romanized: Isekai Ken-Ō Seizon-Ki) is a South Korean web novel written by Kyungbae Lim. It was serialized via Kakao's digital comic and fiction platform KakaoPage from September 2018 to July 2019. A manhwa webtoon adaptation illustrated by Soon-Q Kwon has been serialized via KakaoPage since December 2019. The manhwa has been published in English by Tapas. A Japanese-South Korean anime adaptation produced by Studio Pierrot and Red Dog Culture House has been announced.

== Plot ==
The story of Latna Saga: Survival of a Sword King follows the main protagonist Ryu Han-bin a Korean man that completed his mandatory military service who was summoned to another world. Unlike the others who were summoned to the fantasy world Rathna his guideline (a system given to people from earth that allows them to level up and use skills) was broken and left him to be stuck in Selha Latna a training area for otherworlders that get them ready to transition to Rathna. Han-bin was stuck in Selha Latna for over 20 years constantly leveling up and getting reset back to level 1. After being stuck for so many years leveling up and getting reset when he escapes, he is way stronger than the normal otherworlders at his level and is overpowered compared to most. After escaping Selha Latna the real story begins as Han-bin adventures out into Rathna with the goal of surviving and getting stronger given to him by the system. As Han-bin explores Ratna he meets his companions Atisse a dragon with the ability to turn himself into a human and Ephyr a wyvern that can also turn into a human that travels with him on his journey. But quickly their adventure turns into a mission to defeat the evil god Ormphlaus (the creator of the guidelines) that is trying to take over the world of Rathna.

== Characters ==
- Ryu-Han Bin

After being discharged from his military mandatory service, Ryu Han Bin was transported to a fantasy world where he's tasked to fight monsters, however his guide system was filled with errors leaving him trapped in that world for years.

- Kivye
