= Who Made Me a Princess =

South Korean web novel series

- First webtoon adaptation volume cover
- Author: Plutus
- Country: South Korea
- Language: Korean
- Genre: Drama, fantasy
- Publisher: Ridi (Korean); Tapas (English)
- Published: December 20, 2017 – October 24, 2018
- Media type: web novel
- No. of books: 9

Who Made Me a Princess

어느 날 공주가 되어버렸다 RR: Eoneu nal gongjuga doeeo beoryeotda MR: Ŏnŭ nal kongjuga toeŏ pŏryŏtta
- Author: Plutus
- Illustrator: Spoon
- Publisher: Location Book; Carrotoon; Kadokawa Shoten (Japan)
- English publisher: NA: Seven Seas Entertainment (English)
- Webtoon service: Ridi (South Korea); Tapas (English); Tappytoon (English)
- Original run: December 20, 2017 – April 30, 2022
- Volumes: 9

Who Made Me a Princess
- Also known as: The Fated Magical Princess: Who Made Me a Princess
- Directed by: Yingying Zhang
- No. of episodes: 16

Production
- Production company: Colored Pencil Animation

Original release
- Network: iQIYI (China)
- Release: September 28 – December 28, 2025
- Network: Tokyo MX, BS NTV, AT-X (Japan)
- Release: October 2 – December 29, 2025
- Network: Crunchyroll (streaming); SEA: Muse Communication

Who Made Me a Princess (Korean: 어느 날 공주가 되어버렸다) is a South Korean fantasy web novel written by Plutus. The webtoon, illustrated by Spoon, was first serialized in Ridi on December 20, 2017, with the first season concluded on February 10, 2019, followed by its second season which was released from July 2019 to August 2020, and thereafter with its third season which was released from November 2020 to April 2022. The webtoon has been licensed in English by Seven Seas Entertainment, with individual chapters have been collected and published in nine volumes, as of December 2022.

A Chinese animated television series adaptation produced by Colored Pencil Animation was released in September 2025, alongside the Japanese dub in October 2025, which aired till December of the same year.

== Plot ==
A modern-day woman suddenly awakens in the body of Athanasia, a young princess from a novel she once read, who is destined to be executed by her own father, Emperor Claude de Alger Obelia. Knowing the tragic fate that awaits her, Athanasia resolves to survive by avoiding attention, saving money to escape the palace, or, if necessary, winning over the emperor to change her destiny.

As she grows up within the imperial palace, Athanasia unexpectedly encounters Claude earlier than in the original story. Despite his reputation as a cold and ruthless ruler, their interactions begin to alter the course of events. Through cautious behavior and gradual efforts to build a relationship with him, Athanasia starts to influence the emperor's feelings, creating a fragile bond between father and daughter that did not exist before. As time passes, Athanasia becomes entangled in the politics of the palace and the appearance of other key figures from the original story, including those whose actions could still lead to her downfall.

== Characters ==
Athanasia (アタナシア, Atanashia)
Voiced by: Sumire Morohoshi (Japanese)
Claude (クロード, Kurōdo)
Voiced by: Tomoaki Maeno (Japanese)
Felix (フィリックス, Firikkusu)
Voiced by: Ryōhei Kimura (Japanese)
Lucas (ルーカス, Rūkasu)
Voiced by: Nobuhiko Okamoto (Japanese)
Ijekiel (イゼキエル, Izekieru)
Voiced by: Shūichirō Umeda (Japanese)
Jennette (ジェニット, Jenitto)
Voiced by: Manaka Iwami (Japanese)
Lilian York (リリアン・ヨルク, Ririan Yoruku)
Voiced by: Azumi Waki (Japanese)
Diana (ダイアナ, Daiana)
Voiced by: Kana Hanazawa (Japanese)
Duke Alpheus (アルフィアス公爵, Arufiasu Kōshaku) / Roger Alpheus (ロジャー・アルフィアス, Rojā Arufiasu)
Voiced by: Junichi Suwabe (Japanese)
Anastacius (アナスタシウス, Anasutashiusu)
Voiced by: Hidenori Takahashi (Japanese)

== Media ==
=== Web novel ===
Who Made Me a Princess was first serialized on Ridi's digital comic since December 20, 2017. The novel is licensed in English by Tapas.

==== Volumes ====
No.	Korean release date	Korean ISBN
01	December 27, 2017	979-11-2930-711-8
02	December 27, 2017	979-11-2930-712-5
03	March 28, 2018	979-11-2930-713-2

=== Webtoon ===
A webtoon adaptation launched in Ridi on December 20, 2017, and concluded its first season on February 10, 2019; its second season began on July 9 of that same year, and concluded on April 30, 2022, with the third season. The webtoon has been published digitally in English by Tappytoon and Tapas, with the collected volumes licensed and published in North America by Seven Seas Entertainment since May 16, 2023.

==== Volumes ====
No.	Original release date	Original ISBN	English release date	English ISBN
01	August 30, 2019	979-11-29335-41-8	May 16, 2023	978-1-68579-678-5
02	November 8, 2019	979-11-29338-18-1	September 12, 2023	978-1-68579-684-6
03	March 4, 2020	979-11-29345-58-5	November 7, 2023	978-1-68579-770-6
04	Juky 3, 2020	979-11-29352-56-9	January 23, 2024	978-1-68579-771-3
05	July 20, 2021	979-1-12-937858-3	March 26, 2024	978-1-68579-780-5
06	December 31, 2021	979-1-12-938738-7	June 6, 2024	979-8-88843-204-4
07	September 27, 2022	979-1-14-040171-0	September 24, 2024	979-8-89160-113-0
08	November 30, 2022	979-1-14-040497-1	December 10, 2024	979-8-89160-114-7
09	November 30, 2022	979-1-14-040498-8	March 18, 2025	979-8-89160-115-4

=== Donghua ===
A Chinese animated television series adaptation by Colored Pencil Animation was announced. The series was released from September 28 to December 28, 2025, on iQIYI, with the Japanese dub aired from October 2 to December 29 of the same year, on Tokyo MX and other networks. (Note: Tokyo MX and BS NTV listed the series premiere on October 1 at 25:00, which is effectively October 2 at 1:00 a.m. JST.) For the Japanese dub, the opening theme song is "Ii yo" (いいよ; 'Alright'), performed by Daoko, while the ending theme song is "Sono Hitomi de" (その瞳で; 'In Those Eyes'), performed by XAI. Crunchyroll streamed the series under the title The Fated Magical Princess: Who Made Me a Princess. Muse Communication licensed the series in Southeast Asia.

==== Episodes ====
No.	Title	Directed by (Note: Production staff information is taken from the ending credits of each episode.)	Written by	Storyboarded by	Original release date (Note: Episodes are released on dAnime Store, U-NEXT, Crunchyroll and simulcast platforms by Muse 3 days before their televised airings.)
1	"Fate Begins to Stir"; Transliteration: "Ugokidasu Unmei" (Japanese: 動きだす運命)	Unknown	Unknown	TBA	October 2, 2025 (Note: The first 3 episodes aired back-to-back.)
Empress Consort Diana dies giving birth to Emperor Claude Obelia's daughter Athanasia. Having never loved Diana Claude completely ignores Athanasia. At a few days old Athanasia gains adult intelligence and has a vision of her future where she is accused of plotting Claude's assassination, leading to her imprisonment and suicide. Diana's friend Lilian decides to raise Athanasia herself. Three years later Athanasia is beloved by her servants who find her adorable, except for a greedy maid who searches Athanasia's home hoping to steal treasure. Athanasia takes her to the kitchen where the only remaining treasure is dinner plates decorated with jewels. When she attacks Athanasia with a knife Athanasia drops a chandelier on her and she is arrested by the guards. It is shown Athanasia has continued to have prophetic dreams and predicted that if she hadn’t captured the thief herself the thief would have murdered Lilian. Athanasia hides the jewels, hoping to use them to change her future. Claude is informed of Athanasia's capture of the thief but shows no interest. Elsewhere, the most powerful wizard in the world senses someone has changed the fate of the Obelia Empire.
2	"Papa"; Transliteration: "Papa" (Japanese: パパ)	Unknown	Unknown	TBA	October 2, 2025
Athanasia continues to steal jewels. From her predictions she knows she won't meet Claude for four years. She wonders if Claude hates her because she didn't inherit magic. She also wonders if Claude's other daughter, Jennette, has magic. She overhears her maids discussing an upcoming security inspection and decides to move part of her treasure to a large building across the garden. The building turns out to be another palace and by unfortunate chance she encounters Claude much sooner than predicted. Rather than the demon she expected Claude is merely stern but recognises her from her resemblance to Diana. Despite discovering the treasure she was carrying Claude invites her to tea. Claude explains Athanasia is a historical name granted only to royal heirs, so Diana was presumptuous to have given her the name when she is not an heir. Athanasia knows from her dreams Claude was also a consort's child and seized the throne from his cruel older brother in a war. Unsure how to talk to him Athanasia calls him "Papa" and then panics it might make him angry. Amazingly, Claude sends her home with his guard Felix, promising to invite her to tea again. Lilian is amazed Claude actually took an interest in her.
3	"Princess of the Obelia Empire"; Transliteration: "Oberia Teikoku no Hime" (Japanese: オベリア帝国の姫)	Unknown	Unknown	TBA	October 2, 2025
Claude decides he will oversee Athanasia's upbringing as a princess, starting with having tea together once a day. Athanasia slowly relaxes around him, though he remains intimidating. Claude takes her boating on his lake, worrying Lilian and Felix as Claude is unused to looking after children by himself. When Claude asks what she is thinking she blurts out that she likes his golden hair. Claude reminds her he has the treasure he confiscated if she wants it back, but she daren't ask. While reaching for a lotus flower Athanasia falls into the water. Claude rescues her and while he appears furious he uses magic to dry her and orders Felix to teach her to swim. Athanasia is amazed Claude calls her his daughter for the first time. As he leaves Athanasia notices Claude experiences pain in his chest. Lilian explains the lotus was a Dream Lotus that lures in prey with hallucination magic. Athanasia worries she disappointed Claude. Later, Claude visits the lotus and allows it to give him hallucinations of Diana, causing him to realise he doesn't hate Athanasia after all. Athanasia is shocked when Claude assigns her an additional 20 maids and Felix as her personal knight.
4	"Taboos and Memories"; Transliteration: "Tabū to Kioku" (Japanese: タブーと記憶)	Unknown	Unknown	TBA	October 9, 2025
Athanasia dreams of Diana. Felix sends her to wake Claude, but she instead pinches his cheeks, then sings a lullaby when he almost wakes up. Seeing lots of family portraits Athanasia goes looking for one of Diana but is devastated to find only one remains, with half the face burned away. Realising Claude must have truly hated Diana she decides not to mention her again. However, the next time they have breakfast Athanasia finds she likes Rive tea and claims it tastes of flowers blooming. This seemingly enrages Claude, with Felix explaining Rive comes from Diana's homeland, and she described the tea the same way. Athanasia burns all the pictures she drew of Diana from her dreams. Felix considers asking Claude to magically share memories of Diana with Athanasia, but Athanasia refuses in case it makes Claude hate her. Surprised, Felix insists Claude never hated Diana. Claude uses magic to restore the drawings Athanasia burned. Athanasia asks him to show her his memories, so he asks her to repeat the lullaby, causing Athanasia to realise he was awake when she pinched his cheeks. Singing the lullaby she falls asleep and sees a memory of Diana and Claude laughing together. Claude is amused Athanasia is as impudent as Diana was.
5	"Uninvited Guests"; Transliteration: "Manekarezaru Kyaku" (Japanese: 招かれざる客)	Unknown	Unknown	TBA	October 16, 2025
Duke Alpheus insists Athanasia needs a study companion, then suggests his own son Ijikiel. Athanasia does not trust Alpheus, since one of her visions showed him to be manipulative. Athanasia demonstrates she has already surpassed Ijikiel, amusing Claude. Athanasia begins studying magic intensely. Two years later the wizard spots Lilian and senses her fate was changed to prevent her death, so he follows fate's thread back to Athanasia. Alpheus revisits to suggest a new study companion, Jennette, now an expert in law. Again, Athanasia demonstrates her expertise in the law. Athanasia still cannot use magic so she has Claude buy one of the oldest grimoires in the world that supposedly activates latent magic. The wizard appears and while he fails to realise Athanasia is the one who changes fate he advises she not try the spell. Felix suggests Claude allow Athanasia friends her own age as he is certain she gets lonely, though she denies it. She tries the spell and experiences a strange feeling. The wizard returns and introduces himself as Lucas. He also realises Athanasia is the fate changer and demands to know how she shifted between worlds. She is rescued by a strange creature and uses her first spell to escape. Lucas is unconcerned since Athanasia doomed herself by using the Grimoire. Athanasia reaches Claude but begins vomiting blood and passes out.
6	"The Genius Boy Wizard"; Transliteration: "Tensai Shōnen Mahōtsukai" (Japanese: 天才少年魔法使い)	Unknown	Unknown	TBA	October 23, 2025
Claude feels the pain in his chest again. He summons his healing wizards but they all agree Athanasia's illness has no source. Lucas arrives transformed into a young boy, explaining Athanasia has awoken magic of incredibly high purity. He removes the excess, making her well again, but reveals she has the potential to surpass Claude. Claude hires Lucas to watch Athanasia in case she grows sick again. He also moves Athanasia from Ruby Palace to Emerald Palace. Athanasia worries as she foresaw Jennette was supposed to receive Emerald Palace. She is forced to accept Lucas' presence since someone had placed a seal on her powers that she forced open with the Grimoire. As Lucas is unable to tell who cast the seal he monitors it in case it fails and kills her. Lucas reveals the creature that protected her is a Divine Beast formed from her excess magic. Athanasia names him Raven but Lucas warns touching Raven too much could also kill her. Claude decides she can keep Raven but only for one hour a day. Athanasia convinces Claude Lucas could be her study companion, frustrating Alpheus again. Lucas begins teaching her magic control. Meanwhile, Claude discovers Lucas isn't who he claims as there are signs he manipulated the memories of several people to create a fake life story.
7	"Angel"; Transliteration: "Tenshi-sama" (Japanese: 天使様)	Unknown	Unknown	TBA	October 30, 2025
Lucas explains no two people's magic is alike, so no matter what he teaches her she must find what works for herself. Tired of him being unhelpful Athanasia wishes she had let Alpheus' son Ijikiel teach her instead. Irritated, Lucas teleports her to Alpheus' house on top of Ijikiel, who is so dazed by the impact he mistakes Athanasia for an angel. She hides and overhears Alpheus plans to send Ijikiel to another kingdom for school, since he is no longer in a position to seduce Athanasia into a betrothal by becoming her tutor. Surprised Ijikiel has empathy for others, Athanasia advises him to study hard and prove himself to Alpheus. Lucas suddenly teleports her back, only to be surprised when Athanasia punches him in the face. The servants agree Lucas has made Athanasia more lively. Two weeks pass and Athanasia still cannot find what will make her magic work. While sulking in the gardens a vision of her mother causes her to again be ensnared by the Dream Lotus. Lucas rushes to rescue her, but Athanasia rescues herself by suddenly using water magic. Athanasia decides Lucas can continue teaching her. However, on seeing her soaking wet and filthy, Claude assumes they were up to no good and punishes them both.
8	"A Girl a Lot Like Me"; Transliteration: "Watashi ni Nita Shōjo" (Japanese: 私に似た少女)	Unknown	Unknown	TBA	November 6, 2025
Athanasia asks Lucas to teach her to fly, but he insists she must master levitating inanimate objects first. She convinces Lucas to send her to Ijikiel, since she didn't say goodbye last time. Ijikiel is thrilled to see her again. Athanasia is upset he will be leaving to Arlanta Kingdom as her visions say he is supposed to stay and fall in love with Jennette. At Athanasia's urging Ijikiel takes Jennette to explore the gardens. Athanasia remembers that Jennette's mother rejected Claude for being illegitimate. When Claude took the throne she tried to get him back but was rejected and married a minor royal instead before dying giving birth to Jennette. In the original timeline Jennette would be adopted by Claude and eventually marry him, becoming Athanasia's enemy. Having changed her fate Athanasia wonders if they might become friends. Lucas suspects Jennette is a Chimera, a human child affected by black magic. Lucas also deduces Athanasia has been having visions of the future, though she denies it. Seeing Jennette makes Athanasia miss Claude, so on returning home she insists on hugging him and telling him all about her magic lessons, making Claude proud of her determination. That night, examining the threads of her fate, Lucas is fascinated to see what kind of future Athanasia will bring about.
9	"A Special Present"; Transliteration: "Tokubetsu na Purezento" (Japanese: 特別なプレゼント)	Unknown	Unknown	TBA	November 13, 2025
Athanasia is about to turn 14 and must debut into society with a dance. With only a month to go Athanasia still requires a partner. Athanasia recalls Claude never attended her birthday parties as it is also the anniversary of Diana's death when he mourns in private. Lucas tells her to ask Claude to attend her debut. She does so but after seeing Claude's reaction she changes her mind. She considers asking Felix to be her dance partner but he refuses from fear of Claude. Lily suggests asking Claude to be her partner and Athanasia realises Claude might have wanted her to ask him the whole time. Lucas apologises for interfering so Athanasia demands he help her practice dancing. A maid overhears and spreads gossip that Lucas will be her dance partner. The servants are all confused when Athanasia begins a secret project alongside her magic and dance lessons. She eventually tells Claude she painted a picture for him and asks him to be her dance partner. After celebrating her birthday Lucas gifts her a fireworks display made from magic. As Claude mourns it is shown Athanasia painted a family portrait of herself, Claude and a perfect recreation of Diana from the memory he once shared with her.
10	"Love Rival's Homecoming"; Transliteration: "Koi no Raibaru no Kikyō" (Japanese: 恋のライバルの帰郷)	Unknown	Unknown	TBA	November 20, 2025
Athanasia has a nightmare of Claude dancing with Jennette while ignoring her. This makes her fearful as in the original timeline it was at the dance she was replaced by Jennette and accused of trying to assassinate Claude. Claude finally sends a message agreeing to be her dance partner. Athanasia asks Lucas to transform into an adult as she needs practise dancing with someone as tall as Claude, but he refuses. She considers asking Ijikiel who recently came home after seven years at Arlanta University to be Jennette's dance partner. From sheer pettiness Luces teleports her on top of Ijikiel again at Alpheus' mansion, who still remembers her as the Angel. Not wanting to waste the opportunity Ijikiel shows her his favourite field of flowers where they first met. He tells her about his time in Arlanta but before they can talk further Athanasia is summoned back by Lucas. Lucas appears in an unusually foul mood but refuses to explain why. The night before the dance Lily tells her she is proud of her and to enjoy the experience. Athanasia still worries if she has done enough to make Claude proud of her.
11	"Glittering Stars of the Ball"; Transliteration: "Butōkai no Hoshi no Kirameki" (Japanese: 舞踏会の星のきらめき)	Unknown	Unknown	TBA	November 27, 2025
Claude escorts Athanasia to the ball. She worries about what might happen but is able to explain her fear as nervousness of dancing with an audience. Alpheus has secretly brought Jennette as a guest, promising to introduce her to her real father and sister she has never met. The dance begins and Athanasia steps on Claude's foot, but he covers her mistake so no one notices. The dance ends successfully and Athanasia is able to socialise with other girls her own age but notices Jennette is absent. Ijikiel appears and asks her to dance. Alpheus meets Claude and explains he has a foster-daughter he would like Claude to meet, and hopefully become friends with Athanasia, but Claude spots a masked man in the audience and ignores Alpheus. Athanasia announces she has spent her whole life practising magic in order to give Claude a gift on this night. She projects a starry sky onto the ceiling and amidst a field of flowers and butterflies she conjures a perfect illusion of Diana to dance with Claude one last time. The dance ends and returning home Claude gives Athanasia a jewelled hair ornament as a late birthday gift. Alpheus meets with the masked man, who is disappointed Claude didn't meet Jennette but assures Alpheus he has a plan. Jennette is upset she couldn't meet her family.
12	"Tea Party in the Rose Garden"; Transliteration: "Baraen de no Ochakai" (Japanese: バラ園でのお茶会)	Unknown	Unknown	TBA	December 4, 2025
Athanasia remains confused why Alpheus didn’t introduce Jennette to Claude as predicted. Athanasia faints and Lucas diagnoses her magic fluctuating dangerously. Lucas is stuck between resenting Athanasia’s weakness and guilt for knowing she will die without him. Athanasia receives social invitations from dozens of people, displeasing Claude who suspects they want to manipulate her. Athanasia takes Claude boating, hoping the Dream Lotus will relax him enough to let her accept the invitations. Exasperated, Claude levitates a Lotus out of the water, showing her it is a monster under the surface. Athanasia panics and flips the boat so they both fall in, forcing Claude to rescue her again before scolding her. Claude later gifts her a rose garden, implying she can invite people to visit her instead. Excited, Athanasia invites Jennette and several others to tea. Jennette becomes lost in the palace grounds and encounters Claude, who almost punishes her for trespassing until realising she is Athanasia’s guest. Jennette is shaken by the experience but is sure Claude won’t be angry when he learns she is his daughter. Over tea Jennette notices Athanasia struggling to socialise and makes attempts to help her, which Athanasia appreciates and accepts an invitation to visit Jennette’s home. Later, Lucas grows concerned after removing a piece of black magic from Athanasia, the same type he sees attached to Claude all the time with no clue as to its source.
13	"The Princess's Adventure"; Transliteration: "Hime-sama no Bōken" (Japanese: 姫様の冒険)	Unknown	Unknown	TBA	December 11, 2025
A sinister man retrieves something from Lucas’ wizard tower, intending to use it against Athanasia. Athanasia is confused to find Ijikiel in her library but Lucas interrupts, claiming Claude would not be happy Ijikiel was alone with Athanasia. Ijikiel realises Lucas is the wizard who became Athanasia’s tutor instead of him and agrees to leave. As she has been invited to several tea parties Athanasia requires gifts for her friends, so Lucas helps by teleporting her from the palace to shop in town. They spot Jennette also shopping for gifts and overhear her plans to buy something from the Magic Market. Athanasia decides to follow her as the Market is full of criminals and dangerous magical items. Lucas suddenly senses powerful black magic nearby and rushes to find the source. The sinister man approaches Jennette and suggests a hair ornament as a gift. As she returns home the ornament summons a giant monster. Athanasia steps in to protect Jennette. Trapped fighting the black magic Lucas sends Raven to help Athanasia. Raven attacks the monster, which Athanasia kills with Light magic, destroying the ornament. Since neither of them should have been there Athanasia and Jennette agree to keep it secret between them. Lucas sends everyone home. The sinister man admits Athanasia impressed him.
14	"The Hero Who Saved Aug"; Transliteration: "Ōgu-kun o Sukū Eiyū" (Japanese: オーグ郡を救う英雄)	Unknown	Unknown	TBA	December 18, 2025
Due to an unprecedented rise in monsters attacking farms Claude suspects an enemy is responsible and deploys extra wizards. Athanasia learns Lucas funded her shopping trip with magical coins that disappear after 24 hours. She is forced to borrow money from Felix to repay the shopkeepers. Unfortunately, this leaves her owing money to Felix, so she decides to earn money protecting farms with the other wizards. Claude is reluctant but lets her protect farms in Aug District where Diana was born. Lucas announces he is also leaving to deal with a particular problem and is unsure when he will return. He is surprised Athanasia is worried about him as he has never had a friend before. Felix and Athanasia reach Aug where Count Harris is surprised a young princess like Athanasia is also the strongest wizard he has ever seen, able to kill monsters with ease. Athanasia repays Felix and Harries reveals he was there the day Claude met Diana. During a famine caused by the black magic of his older brother Anastacius Claude visited Aug with emergency food supplies and fell in love with Diana almost instantly. To end the spread of black magic Claude killed Anastacius and made Diana his Empress Consort. Meanwhile, the sinister man casts black magic over one of Athanasia’s hair ribbons. Lucas locates a grave in the forest leaking black magic and concludes whoever the man was he must have been unspeakably evil to still be so corrupted by black magic after being dead for decades.
15	"Claude's Precious Memory"; Transliteration: "Kurōdo no Taisetsuna Omoide" (Japanese: クロードの大切な思い出)	Unknown	Unknown	TBA	December 25, 2025
Claude visits Aug to offer the first wheat of the harvest at Aug’s Wellspring. Lucas traces the black magic back to his own tower and finds evidence of the sinister man. Meanwhile, Claude and Athanasia also visit the tower which is built over Aug’s Wellspring, which Lucas has protected for generations. The Wellspring turns out to be a pool feeding a giant tree, where all souls are said to originate. Athanasia and Claude offer the wheat as thanks, but the black magic placed in her hair ribbon lures in Dream Lotuses from under the water. Claude saves Athanasia but ends up unconscious inside his own magic barrier. Lucas realises he can only be awoken inside his mind, and only people he trusts with his life can enter. Athanasia volunteers but Lucas warns her if she fails Claude will be erased from existence while the Lotuses destroy her mind. Lucas sends her into his mind to find the memory at the centre of Claude’s soul. Athanasia travels though dozens of memories of Diana, but none are Claude’s most precious memory. She sees a memory of Claude refusing to let her be born as he knew Athanasia would steal Diana’s magic and she would die giving birth, yet Diana insisted on giving birth anyway. She locates the correct memory in Claude’s subconscious and learns after Diana’s death he cast a black magic spell on himself to suppress his emotions and all memory of Diana. The grief of the memory is so strong Athanasia cannot get inside to wake him up.
16	"Love That Transcends Time"; Transliteration: "Toki o Koeta Ai" (Japanese: 時を超えた愛)	Unknown	Unknown	TBA	December 28, 2025 (Note: This episode aired 3 days earlier than the scheduled broadcast date.)
Athanasia is confronted by a manifestation of her loneliness and resentment that claims without emotions Claude has never once loved her. It also claims it is inevitable she will be replaced by Jennette as it was Athanasia that killed Diana. Athanasia almost succumbs to despair but is saved by Diana’s soul returning from the Wellspring. Athanasia tearfully tells her everything she ever wanted to say to her. Diana reveals Athanasia’s dreams were actually memories of a life Athanasia lived before, but at the moment of her suicide Diana rewound time to give Athanasia her adult memories while still a baby. It was also Diana that sealed her magic until she could use it properly. Diana breaks the seal and promises Athanasia she will be watching. With her full powers Athanasia breaks open Claude’s subconscious and assures him Diana would want him to be happy. They are freed from the Wellspring but remain unconscious. Lucas visits Athanasia in her subconscious to warn her the sinister man is still dangerous, but he is determined to protect her. To that end he must leave to find the power he needs but promises to return. Athanasia awakens but Claude has somehow lost his memories of her. Without those memories he reverts to a bitter, angry version of himself with no interest in her, so he confines her inside the Emerald Palace. Feeling lost, she sends a magical message to Lucas as he crosses a frozen wasteland seeking another tree.

== Reception ==
The series came in fourth place in AnimeJapan's 2022 poll of series people want to see receive an anime adaptation. The series was ranked fourth in the 2024 Vertical Manga Award in the completed comic category.
