= A Returner's Magic Should Be Special =

South Korean web novel

- Cover of the first volume of the manhwa adaptation, featuring Desir Herrman

귀환자의 마법은 특별해야 합니다 RR: Gwihwanjaui mabeobeun teukbyeolhaeya hamnida MR: Kwihwanjaŭi mabŏbŭn t'ŭkpyŏrhaeya hamnida
- Genre: Adventure, fantasy
- Author: Usonan
- Illustrator: Wookjakga
- Publisher: D&C Media (South Korea); Kadokawa Shoten (Japan)
- English publisher: NA: Yen Press
- Webtoon service: KakaoPage (South Korea); Piccoma (Japan); Tappytoon (English)
- Original run: May 19, 2018 – present
- Volumes: 6
- Anime television series
- Directed by: Taishi Kawaguchi
- Written by: Takamitsu Kōno
- Music by: Kenta Higashiohji
- Studio: Arvo Animation
- Licensed by: Crunchyroll (streaming); SEA: Muse Communication
- Original network: AT-X; Tokyo MX, BS11, GTV, GYT, Chukyo TV, MBS (S1); Fuji TV (+Ultra), Kansai TV, THK (S2)
- Original run: October 8, 2023 – present
- Episodes: 13

A Returner's Magic Should Be Special (Korean: 귀환자의 마법은 특별해야 합니다; Japanese: 帰還者の魔法は特別です) is a South Korean web novel written by Usonan. It was serialized in Kakao's digital comic and fiction platform KakaoPage from September 2016 to August 2019. A webtoon adaptation was first serialized in KakaoPage in May 2018, and is illustrated by Wookjakga. An anime television series adaptation produced by Arvo Animation aired from October to December 2023. A second season premiered in October 2026.

== Plot ==
In 3626, an alternate dimension eroding the world (the "shadow world") appears, and the only way to stop it and save the world is to conquer it. Desir Herrman and several of his companions manage to defeat the final boss of the shadow world, only for it to explode. Desir thought that he would be killed, but instead wakes up as himself 13 years earlier, when he takes the entrance exam for Hebrion Academy. There he meets his friends Romantica and Azest, but they did not share his memories of the future. Knowing the challenge that lies ahead, Desir decides to take action to change the future and save the world.

== Characters ==
Desir Herrman (デジール・アルマン, Dejīru Aruman; Korean: 데지르 아르망)
Voiced by: Takuma Terashima (Japanese); Austin Tindle (English)
A mage who returned to the past after failing to clear the Shadow World. He was one of last six survivors of the Shadow Labyrinth that defeated the boss Boromir Napolitan, but died after Napolitan's dying heart exploded that destroyed the world. Having retained his memories of the previous timeline, he uses that knowledge in order to avoid a repeat of the future he experienced.
Romantica Eru (ロマンティカ・エル, Romantika Eru; Korean: 로맨티카 에루)
Voiced by: Sayumi Suzushiro (Japanese); Sarah Roach (English)
A wind mage and one of Desir's party members. Romantica hails from a noble family, but was placed in the beta class despite her strong aptitude for magic due to the fact that she is from a commoner family who bought their nobility title. In the previous timeline, she is killed in action.
Pram Schneider (プラム・シュナイザー, Puramu Shunaizā; Korean: 프람 슈나이저)
Voiced by: Natsumi Fujiwara (Japanese); Macy Anne Johnson (English)
A swordsman and one of Desir's party members. Pram is the son of a noble father that he never met, and a commoner mother who raised him until her death. He is known for his swordsmanship using a rapier, but started out reluctant to use it due to his disdain for father before he was convinced by Desir to use it. In the previous timeline, he is killed in action.
Azest Kingscrown (アゼスト・キングスクラウン, Azesuto Kingusukuraun; Korean: 아제스트 킹스크라운)
Voiced by: Asami Seto (Japanese); Anastasia Muñoz (English)
The heir to the Hebrion throne and the top student at the academy. She is Desir's girlfriend who takes on the identity as a member of the noble Kingscrown family to hide her identity. She was one of the last survivors of the Shadow Labyrinth in the previous timeline and the one who delivered the final strike to slay Napolitan.

== Media ==
=== Novel ===
Written by Usonan, the novel was serialized on Kakao's digital comic and fiction platform KakaoPage from September 2, 2016, to August 3, 2019. It was collected into eight volumes.

==== Volumes ====
| No. | Korean release date | Korean ISBN |
|---|---|---|
| 1 | June 30, 2017 | 979-11-6145-022-3 |
| 2 | July 1, 2017 | 979-11-6145-023-0 |
| 3 | October 1, 2017 | 979-11-6145-041-4 |
| 4 | February 1, 2018 | 979-11-6145-058-2 |
| 5 | May 1, 2018 | 979-11-6145-085-8 |
| 6 | August 1, 2018 | 979-11-6145-122-0 |
| 7 | February 1, 2019 | 979-11-6145-203-6 |
| 8 | November 27, 2019 | 979-11-6145-289-0 |

=== Manhwa ===
A manhwa adaptation, illustrated by Wookjakga, began serialization on KakaoPage on May 19, 2018. As of March 2025, D&C Media has published seven volumes.

In Japan, the series is published by Piccoma digitally and Kadokawa Shoten in print. In English, Tappytoon publishes the series digitally. In October 2021, Yen Press announced that they licensed the series for English publication.

==== Volumes ====
| No. | Original release date | Original ISBN | English release date | English ISBN |
|---|---|---|---|---|
| 1 | January 11, 2021 | 979-11-973038-3-8 | August 9, 2022 | 978-1-9753-4116-9 |
| 2 | July 9, 2021 | 979-11-91363-94-4 | April 18, 2023 | 978-1-9753-6063-4 |
| 3 | February 10, 2023 | 979-11-6777-062-2 | March 19, 2024 | 978-1-9753-9204-8 |
| 4 | May 22, 2023 | 979-11-6777-088-2 | July 23, 2024 | 978-1-9753-9206-2 |
| 5 | December 28, 2023 | 979-11-93549-60-5 | September 23, 2025 | 979-8-8554-1987-0 |
| 6 | June 27, 2024 | 979-11-93821-29-9 | April 28, 2026 | 979-8-8554-1989-4 |
| 7 | March 14, 2025 | 979-11-93821-86-2 | — | — |

=== Anime ===
An anime television series adaptation was announced by Aniplex at AnimeJapan on March 25, 2023. It is produced by Arvo Animation and directed by Taishi Kawaguchi, with scripts written by Takamitsu Kōno, character designs handled by Hiromi Katō, and music composed by Kenta Higashiohji. The series aired from October 8 to December 24, 2023, on Tokyo MX and other networks. (Note: Tokyo MX lists the series premiere on October 7 at 24:00, which is effectively October 8 at 12:00 a.m. JST.) The opening theme song is "Get Back" by Flow, while the ending theme song is "6 o Naderu" (6を撫でる; "Stroke the 6") by Momosu Momosu. Crunchyroll streamed the series outside of East Asia. Muse Communication licensed the series in Southeast Asia.

A second season was announced after the final episode of the first season. Following a re-air of the first season on Fuji TV and Kansai TV from July 3 to October 2, 2026, the second season premiered on Fuji TV's +Ultra programming block on October 8 of the same year. The opening theme song is "Sorrow" by Flow, and the ending theme song is "Everlasting" by Krage.

==== Episodes ====
===== Season 1 (2023) =====
| No. | Title | Directed by (Note: Information is taken from the ending credits of each episode.) | Storyboarded by | Original release date |
|---|---|---|---|---|
| 1 | "Destruction"; Transliteration: "Hametsu" (Japanese: 破滅) | Taishi Kawaguchi | Taishi Kawaguchi | October 8, 2023 |
Ten years ago, the world became a Shadow World that killed the majority of the world's inhabitants. To save the world, 150 million mages entered the Shadow Labyrinth to clear it, but only six remained. The remaining mages finally defeat the dungeon boss Boromir Napolitan. After the battle, the dragon's heart suddenly explodes that destroys the world and kills the remaining mages with a massive burst of mana. One of the last six, Desir Herrman, finds himself returning 13 years into the past right before the Hebrion Academy entrance ceremony. Brigitte, a professor at the school, explains the entrance exam and its objective, to clear a pseudo-Shadow World. In the school's courtyard, Desir is approached by his mentor, the second-year student Ladoria Doriche, who brings him to the test area. Desir explains that Hebrion Academy discriminates by putting all nobles in the alpha class and commoners in the beta class regardless of ability, and beta students are not properly educated. After passing by Elheim Trikincy, a second-year alpha student who Ladoria despises, and being ridiculed by him, Desir arrives at the test area where he meets Romantica Eru, a comrade who died in the previous timeline.
| 2 | "The Test"; Transliteration: "Shiken" (Japanese: 試験) | Taishi Kawaguchi | Taishi Kawaguchi | October 15, 2023 |
Before the test, Desir is introduced to Azest Kingscrown, who delivered the final strike on Napolitan in the previous timeline, by her mentor Elheim. The test begins as Desir, Romantica, Azest, and three other applicants enter an artificial Shadow World in which the objective is to be one of the first three to cross the goal using any means necessary. The test begins with Azest running towards the goal, while Desir and Romantica team up to take out one of the other three applicants after the applicant nearly hits Romantica with his attack, with Azest taking out the other two. Romantica then engages in a battle with Desir. Despite casing powerful wind spells, Desir counters it with inverse spells. Desir then casts a fireball spell on himself to catapult him to Azest's location. Desir uses inverse spells again to defeat Azest and cross the goal first. Azest then crosses second, while Romantica crosses the goal to finish third and pass the test.
| 3 | "Comrades"; Transliteration: "Nakama" (Japanese: 仲間) | Taishi Kawaguchi | Shōtarō Hashiguchi | October 22, 2023 |
The academy faculty and staff assemble to discuss placement, and despite their stance on relegating all commoners to the beta class, Brigitte recommends Desir to be in the alpha class. The results are released and Romantica is surprised to find herself in the beta class. After her first day in class, Romantica is invited by the alpha class student Doneta Hadoon to join his party, but hesitates when Doneta requires her to go on a date. Afterwards, Desir approaches Romanica with a request to join his party and leaves her with a letter to read in private. Later in the day, Desir watches another beta class student Pram Schnaizer, another comrade Desir fought with, have a sparring match with the alpha student Percival Asenguitz. Pram, known for his fast strikes with the sword, he uses a heavy sword and loses. Afterwards, Desir and Romantica talk in private regarding the letter, and Desir reveals that the administration is aware that Romantica's parents bought the nobility title from a merchant, hence her placement in the beta class. With Desir having formed a party with Pram and Romantica determined to be in the same party as Pram, Romantica joins Desir's party.
| 4 | "Forming a Party"; Transliteration: "Kessei" (Japanese: 結成) | Daisuke Kurose | Kaori Higuchi | October 29, 2023 |
Desir, Romantica, and Pram meet with Brigitte to officially form a party with Brigitte as its advisor. Desir explains his plan to get promoted to alpha by placing in the top nine of the ranking tournament, which has never been accomplished by a beta student. Brigitte approves the party hoping to reform the academy's discriminatory system. Afterwards, Desir cleans up the rat-infested training room assigned to the party. Romantica begins her training by improving her magic accuracy, while Desir tells Pram that there is nothing he can teach him knowing that getting him to wield a rapier instead of a heavy sword is the key. Pram shows Desir a rapier his father passed to him, then explains his background having been born to a noble father and a commoner mother. Wanting to impress his father that he never knew, Pram trained with the rapier. But his mother passed away and with her last words, told Pram to stay away from his father. Afterwards, Pram enrolled at Hebrion to find his father knowing that several nobles attend the school. Three days later, Romanitca improves her magical accuracy, while Pram sold his rapier out of disgust for his father.
| 5 | "Rapier"; Transliteration: "Reipia" (Japanese: 細剣(レイピア)) | Masato Kitagawa | Nagisa Miyazaki | November 5, 2023 |
Pram brings Desir to the shop he sold his rapier to buy it back, paying forty silver coins for it after Pram sold it for three silver coins as Pram sold it as a sword, but Desir bought it as a special kind of sword called a kemuvin. With Desir using his magic to figure out how to unsheathe it, he gives it to Pram to unsheathe it, learning that the sword is made of blancium, a rare metal that is powerful and lightweight. Despite already agreeing to sell the sword, the shop owner demands Pram return the rapier. As such, Pram fights the shop's bodyguard in a duel. Pram is knocked around as his moves were easy to read, but is able to quickly react and use his speed to knock the bodyguard out and get out of the shop. Meanwhile, Romantica completes the training exercise. She has dinner with Doneta and rejects his offer to join, telling him that she was once a commoner. She leaves with a warning for Doneta not to look down on commoners, and Doneta reacts angrily as it is revealed that his father was executed in a rebellion organized by commoners.
| 6 | "Final Round"; Transliteration: "Honsen" (Japanese: 本戦) | Taishi Kawaguchi | Tsukasa Sunaga | November 12, 2023 |
Desir's party makes the final round of the ranking tournament in dominating fashion. Outraged by the party's success, Professor Fergman calls Blue Moon, the top-ranked party at Hebrion led by Azest and advised by Fergman, in for a meeting, instructing them to use any means necessary to eliminate them. After the meeting, fellow party members Doneta and Percival approach Azest demanding that they be given permission to defeat Romantica and Pram, respectively. Azest agrees with the condition that she defeats Desir. In preparation for the final round, Desir's party studies Shadow Worlds at the school's library, and Azest approaches Desir to declare war. Desir reveals that he engaged in combat with Azest at the entrance ceremony to motivate her to get as strong as possible. The day of the final round arrives with the parties battling each other to clear the artificial Shadow World. The final round begins with Desir fighting a female ice mage. Despite her impressive ability to cast two spells at once, Desir exposes her inability to control her magic and uses an inversion spell to defeat her with her own magic to make her the first of 30 students to be eliminated.
| 7 | "Magical Beasts"; Transliteration: "Majū" (Japanese: 魔獣) | Taishi Kawaguchi | Nagisa Miyazaki | November 19, 2023 |
Romantica and Pram meet up and with their teamwork, take out two participants. Afterwards, Desir finds Romantica and Pram, and the party is together again. With 18 participants remaining, the party plots their course of action as Desir decides that their chances of getting promoted are better if they are among the last nine remaining rather than to clear the Shadow World. The Privius Clock Tower rings that summons magical beasts into the Shadow World, triggering a survival quest. The remaining participants are attacked by a pack of Kildra mice. Desir's party runs away, and needing to defeat only the leader that Desir draws it out with his blood. Romantica attacks it with her magic, but fails to kill it due to its high magic resistance. Pram goes into the pack to defeat the leader and succeeds after an exhausting battle to clear the survival quest. The party rests while Desir recomposes himself after Pram went against his orders to retreat. The other parties clear their survival quests with a member of Blue Moon being the only casualty. The parties head to the Privius Clock Tower where a battle royale awaits.
| 8 | "Crash"; Transliteration: "Gekitotsu" (Japanese: 激突) | Daisuke Kurose | Tsukasa Sunaga | November 26, 2023 |
Romantica eliminates two members of Blue Moon and Pine Tree each with a sneak attack from the clock tower, leaving just 13 participants left. The Blue Moon, Red Dragon, and Pine Tree parties meet up at the clock tower entrance and begin fighting each other. Having figured out that Desir had set a trap for the three parties to eliminate each other to get to the top nine, Azest immobilizes the opponents from the two parties without eliminating them, forcing Desir's party to have to defeat Blue Moon in order to get promoted. The parties have their promised one-on-one battles as Desir fights Azest, Romantica fights Doneta, and Pram fights Percival. Romantica uses a fog spell, but Doneta disperses it with his Artifact. Doneta becomes enraged when Romantica tells him that they are alike despite their status. Doneta overwhelms Romantica with his Artifact, and Pram covers for Romantica as Doneta tells Percival to stay out of the fight. Taking advantage of a blind spot caused by Doneta's focus on Romantica, Pram dislodges the Artifact. Pram and Romantica decide that they will take on this battle with Doneta and Percival together. Meanwhile, Desir and Azest fight in the floor above.
| 9 | "Showdown"; Transliteration: "Ketchaku" (Japanese: 決着) | Taishi Kawaguchi | Taishi Kawaguchi; Shiori Sakaguchi | December 3, 2023 |
Frustrated by her inability to beat Desir, Azest unleashes her ultimate spell, Frozen Throne, but Desir inverses her magic circles, prompting Azest to use her magic sword instead. Meanwhile, Doneta and Percival attack Romantica and Pram with a pincer attack, but Romantica defeats both of them with her wind magic. As Azest attacks Desir with her magic sword, Desir uses inversion on the clock tower to sever its magical power and clear the Shadow World to win the tournament. Afterwards, Fergman throws a tantrum in front of the professors and baselessly accuses Brigitte of cheating. The next day, Desir explains his strategy to Azest in that while she correctly figured out that he had set up a trap for the alpha students to eliminate each other, it also bought him time to analyze the clock tower's spell as he could not do so with several opponents present. Brigitte celebrates the party's promotion with an exclusive cake in her office. Brigitte reflects on how strong Desir has gotten as it is revealed that she taught Desir how to use magic. Meanwhile, a rebel group in the shadow labyrinth prepares to strike.
| 10 | "Respite"; Transliteration: "Kyūsoku" (Japanese: 休息) | Masato Kitagawa | Nagisa Miyazaki | December 10, 2023 |
During the school break, Desir's party goes shopping at a mall for a day of fun. Desir runs into Azest at the mall, and the four play a game of air hockey. Azest's competitiveness takes over leading her to use her ice magic that Desir inverses. The next day, the new term begins with Desir's party starting their first day in alpha class with their usual morning practice with Azest joining them. Following the lecture taught by Prelude, Desir approaches her with a request for the party to be dispatched to the Heurelli branch of the magical tower to guard the Tear of Regernel knowing that in ten hours, a rebel group called the Outers will come to steal it. After initially refusing, Prelude agrees to the request. Meanwhile at the magical tower headquarters, Zod Exarion, the inventor of the technology to use magic gems, receives the request and is surprised to see that Desir's party is being sent to the Heurelli branch.
| 11 | "A Raid"; Transliteration: "Shūgeki" (Japanese: 襲撃) | Taishi Kawaguchi | Nagisa Miyazaki | December 17, 2023 |
A poor person carrying a bag of bread bumps into Kraiken, the leader of the Outers, in Heurelli, and Kraiken spoils the bread after warning him to be careful going out at night. Kraiken leads the army of Outers to the gate where they breach it with a combined magic and sword attack knowing that the barrier can only withstand one of the attacks at a time. They are greeted by an army of soldiers and after seeing that they are wearing strong armor, they sneak into the room where the Tear of Regernel is located. Kraiken uses his earth magic to disable the security, but he and his henchmen are met by Pram and Romantica. They take out most of Kraiken's henchmen, but Kraiken escapes with the Tear. Kraiken is met by Desir, who posed as that poor person as by touching Kraiken, he is able to track his mana. Desir and Kraiken engage in battle.
| 12 | "Anti-Mage"; Transliteration: "Anchimeiji" (Japanese: アンチメイジ) | Taishi Kawaguchi | Taishi Kawaguchi; Shiori Sakaguchi | December 24, 2023 |
Kraiken launches a barrage of attacks, only for Desir to inverse all of them. Desir pins Kraiken down with Gravity Control to take back the Tear. Kraiken counters by transforming into a magical beast and initially overwhelms Desir, but Desir inverses the magical beast spell as he just needed time to analyze it. Desir defeats Kraiken with a fireball spell powered by the Tear. The next day, Desir meets Zod and has a chess match as his reward for defending the Tear. During the match, Desir and Zod make a wager with Desir showing his ability to power magical stones. Meanwhile at Fergman's villa, Azest tells Fergman that she is leaving Blue Moon. Sometime later back at school, Desir tells Romantica and Pram that in 13 days, a Shadow World will appear, and he trained them hard to prepare for it. Romantica asks Desir about his secret of being a returner, but just as Desir was about to answer, Romantica stops him and decides she wants to find out herself. Afterwards, Azest joins Desir's party and the four train hard for the upcoming Shadow World. 13 days later, the Shadow World appears, and Desir's party is deployed.

===== Season 2 (2026) =====
| No. overall | No. in season | Title | Directed by | Storyboarded by | Original release date |
|---|---|---|---|---|---|
| 13 | 1 | "Into the Shadow"; Transliteration: "Into~u za Shadō" (Japanese: イントゥザシャドー) | Taishi Kawaguchi | Taishi Kawaguchi | October 7, 2026 |
Desir's party enters the Shadow World to correct the fall of the Holy Domain Evernatten. Desir and Pram are attacked by the Estebans, a tribe of savage warriors that invaded and conquered Evernatten in recorded history. As they assist the guards in defending Evernatten's walls, Azest battles the Esteban's leader Hawk and defeats him. The next day, Desir and Pram speak with the ruler, Wilhelm Evernatten, explaining that he has come to protect the city, but unable to share the details causing Wilhelm to be skeptical of Desir. Wilhelm sees his younger self inside Desir and decides to trust him, clearing another objective. Afterwards, Desir visits Hawk in prison and convinces him to agree to a truce, leaving him with one last objective to resolve the refugee crisis in Evernatten as the town starts to overflow with refugees. Meanwhile, Romanitica, who got separated from the party, works as a merchant in Kelban and learns that there is trouble in the holy capital of Godheim with heavy taxes and disappearing children. Romantica and heads for Evernatten after learning that the rest of her party is there.
| 14 | 2 | "Judgment"; Transliteration: "Jajjimento" (Japanese: ジャッジメント) | Taishi Kawaguchi | Taishi Kawaguchi | October 14, 2026 |
| 15 | 3 | "Yellow Ocean"; Transliteration: "Ierō Ōshan" (Japanese: イエローオーシャン) | Daisuke Kurose | Nagisa Miyazaki | October 21, 2026 |
| 16 | 4 | "Beginning"; Transliteration: "Biginingu" (Japanese: ビギニング) | Taiji Kobayashi | Nagisa Miyazaki | October 28, 2026 |
| 17 | 5 | "Error"; Transliteration: "Erā" (Japanese: エラー) | Daisuke Kurose | Taishi Kawaguchi | November 4, 2026 |
| 18 | 6 | "Arch Wizard"; Transliteration: "Āku U~izādo" (Japanese: アークウィザード) | TBA | TBA | November 11, 2026 |
