= Operation Liberate Men =

Operation Liberate Men (남성해방 대작전) is a manhwa series both written and illustrated by Mira Lee. South Korean publisher Ecomix gained official rights to the series after it was put on hiatus, with Netcomics distributing its English version. The latest edition of the English series was launched beginning in 2007, and has received positive reviews from both readers and the press. Mira Lee is scheduled to continue the series after completing her current project.

== Synopsis ==
After failing her high school entrance exam, Sooha Jung, bullied throughout her life for her boyish manner and appearance, wants nothing more than to disappear from the face of the earth. Ironically, the moment she wishes this, she is found by a boy named Ganesha who offers her that chance. The Para Empire he lives in is a world where women rule and men are slaves. Mistaking her for a boy herself, he begs her to come with him to Para to fight alongside Laharshita, the Male Liberation Army.

Thanks to her failed exam and her difficulties in being her society’s ideal woman, Sooha eagerly agrees to come. But when she arrives in Para, she experiences the cruel reality of the situation. She commits to Laharshita, fighting both for their ideals, but to hide her true gender, as well. Eventually, the men begin to look to her as their new leader, and Sooha learns that fate has a funny way of leading people to their destiny.

== Characters ==
=== Main characters ===
==== Sooha Jung ====
Sixteen-year-old Sooha is a tomboy constantly mistaken for a boy in school and admired for her fighting ability, which she often used to protect her friends from the teasing of male classmates. Her lack of femininity is a sore point for her, but she also has a strong sense of justice, bravery, and loyalty. She was brought to Laharshita due to her status as Shiva’s counterpart, which allows her to stabilize and share powers with Shiva.

==== Ganesha ====
Once known as Esana, the former emperor’s only son, Ganesha was raised in Laharshita and is one of the few male asad (magic) users. After taking the name Ganesha, he was reintroduced into society and became the current Emperor’s only concubine, known as "The Man of Matchless Beauty". He is simultaneously admired for his extraordinary beauty and scorned for his abuse of his wealth and status.

==== Shiva ====
Although the mythology of the Para Empire paints Shiva as a dark god of destruction, he has shown himself to be calm and loyal. Secretly resurrected by Laharshita’s leader, Yuisad, to be their warrior, he lacks control over his powers. He is also said to have lacked empathy upon his rebirth, but through contact with Sooha, he predicted to regain both.

==== Laharshita ====
- Danium - he hostile towards Sooha from the begin, he's the first person to discover sooha is a girl.
- Ati - he friendly towards sooha.
- Yuisad - he's the second person discovering sooha's true gender; his looks are similar of those of shiva that's why when first meeting him sooha mistook him for the real shiva.

==== Royalty and Nobility ====
- Emperor Para - The current Emperor. Violent and immature, Emperor Para is known both for her hunting ability and her jealous, unrequited obsession with her sole concubine, Ganesha.
- Princess Mayura - Para's eccentric sister, she prefers to dress and act as a man, earning her sister's scorn and spurring rumors that she is a lesbian. Despite their opposing personalities she is rarely seen without Milinda, her cousin and childhood friend.
- General Milinda - Mayura's cousin, she is fairer to her slaves than most women, though she does not indulge in their company. She is renowned for her legendary archery skills and the fact that she owns Ednil.
- Lord Frada - A devoted noble in service to the Emperor, she is embittered by the attention Ganesha receives from the Emperor, ashamed that her devotion is being overshadowed by a "mere concubine".

== Publication ==
Ecomics and Netcomics has released 9 volumes of Operation Liberate Men. However, as of February 13, 2012, only volumes 1 – 4 are available in print for the English version. Both these and the proceeding volumes are available on Netcomics’ website on a pay-per-chapter basis.

In 2018, Operation Liberate Men was published on Naver Webtoon.

== Reception ==
Operation Liberate Men has received positive reviews from both the press and readers. As of February 13, 2012, it has earned an average of 9.5/10 from readers and is Netcomics’ 11th most highly rated offering. Furthermore, the series has been described by the Graphic Novel Reporter as an “intriguing and absorbing read” that brings up questions about gender discrimination, but can also “be read exactly at face value and enjoyed”.
