= The Love Doctor (webtoon) =

2017 South Korean manhwa

이성연애박사 RR: Iseong yeonae baksa MR: Isŏng yŏnae paksa
- Genre: Romance, girls' love
- Author: Chamsae
- Illustrator: Bansook
- Publisher: Lezhin Comics
- Original run: April 23, 2016 – December 9, 2017

The Love Doctor (Korean: 이성연애박사) is a South Korean girls' love manhwa series written by Chamsae and illustrated by Bansook. The manhwa was serialized online via Lezhin Comics from April 23, 2016, to December 9, 2017. The story follows Jung Erae, a college student who is so clueless about dating she contacts a love doctor, Cha Yoon, to help her out. The manhwa was published digitally in English by Lezhin Comics two months after the series first began publication.

== Plot ==
Jung Erae, a college student who is clueless about romantic relationships to the point of driving anyway any man she's dated, is fascinated by a flyer of a self-proclaimed love doctor, Cha Yoon. She goes to the doctor in hopes of finally learning everything about dating but instead starts developing newfound feelings for this so-called doctor.

== Reception ==
Kat Calamia, writing for Popverse, praised The Love Doctor for being a "relatable queer story as Erae discovers what it means to love, and the book tackles what it means to find out you're queer." The Comic Book Resources similarly included the series in their "25 Top Manhwa You Need To Read".
