= What Does the Fox Say? (webtoon) =

2017 South Korean manhwa

- Korean cover for Volume 1

^여우는 뭐라고 하는가?
- Genre: Drama, Romance, Yuri
- Author: Team Gaji
- Publisher: Lezhin Comics, Polar Fox
- English publisher: Lezhin Comics, Yen Press
- Magazine: Lezhin Comics
- Original run: April 30, 2015 – December 16, 2019
- Collected volumes: 6

What Does the Fox Say? (Korean: 여우는 뭐라고 하는가?) is a Korean girls' love manhwa series written by Gyeomji and illustrated by Gaji under the collective Team Gaji. The series follows Sungji as she joins a mobile game developer, Hello Studio, and begins a relationship with her team manager Sumin. The manhwa was serialized online via Lezhin Comics from April 2015 to December 2019 after winning Lezhin Comics first World Comic Contest. It was collected into six print volumes by Polar Fox on December 20, 2021.

== Plot ==
As Ju Sungji starts working at a new game development company, Hello Studio, she captures the attention of her coworkers as the newest recruit. However, only one person piques Sungji's interest, her direct and no-nonsense team leader Sung Sumin, who she meets at her welcoming party. At the party Sungji finds out how little Sumin can handle her alcohol, and watches as she is brought home by the company president, Baek Seju. Soon an intense love triangle develops between the three women.

== Media ==
=== Manhwa ===
Written by Gyeomji and illustrated by Gaji under the collective Team Gaji, What Does the Fox Say?, was serialized online via Lezhin Comics from April 2015 to September 2017 after winning Lezhin Comics first World Comic Contest. It was announced in 2018 that the series would go on a hiatus due to dissatisfaction with Lezhin's alleged mistreatment of creators on its platform; only returning in 2019 with three extra side stories. The series was published into two print volumes on March 31, 2017, by Lezhin Comics, and as a six volume complete collection by Polar Fox on December 20, 2021.

The manhwa was published digitally in English by Lezhin Comics, being part of the first batch of titles available when Lezhin launched in North America in 2016. Yen Press announced that they had licensed the series for an English print publication under their Ize Press imprint in 2026.

No.	Original release date	Original ISBN	English release date	English ISBN
1	December 20, 2021	9791191022964	August 25, 2026	9798855423938
2	December 20, 2021	9791191022971	December 15, 2026	9798855423945
3	December 20, 2021	9791191022988	—	—
4	December 20, 2021	9791191022995	—	—
5	December 20, 2021	9791191022032	—	—
6	December 20, 2021	9791191022674	—	—

=== Audio drama ===
On October 29, 2015, Voice Story released a drama CD of What Does the Fox Say?. In July 2021, ACO began releasing their own audio drama of the series through their GLC++ label.

== Reception ==
Kat Calamia, writing for Popverse, praised What Does the Fox Say? as a "well-paced story that isn't afraid to show a slow romance, as Sungji experiences what it means to be in love for the first time" further noting that "Team Gaji does a good job at creating interesting scenarios for the main couple to triumph over that rarely have to do with the fact that they’re two women in a relationship, which is a breath of fresh air."
