= The Greatest Estate Developer =

South Korean web novel series

- First volume cover, featuring Lloyd Frontera

역대급 영지 설계사 Yeokdaegeup yeongji seolgyesa
- Genre: Comedy; Isekai
- Author: BK_Moon; Lee Hyun‑min (adaptation)
- Illustrator: Kim Hyun‑soo
- Publisher: Moon Phase
- Webtoon service: Naver Webtoon (South Korea); Line Webtoon (English)
- Original run: August 5, 2021 – present
- Volumes: 7

The Greatest Estate Developer (Korean: 역대급 영지 설계사) is a South Korean web novel series written by BK_Moon. It was serialized on Naver Corporation's web novel platform Naver Web Novel from June 2019 to November 2020. A manhwa adaptation, which was released as a webtoon, adapted by Lee Hyun‑min, and illustrated by Kim Hyun‑soo, began serialization on Naver Corporation's webtoon platform Naver Webtoon in August 2021. As of November 2025, the webtoon's individual chapters have been collected into seven volumes.

== Plot ==
Suho Kim, a civil engineering student, suddenly wakes up in the body of Lloyd Frontera, a lazy and indebted nobleman in a fantasy world. Using his engineering knowledge, he strives to restore his family's fortunes while introducing innovations from the modern world.

== Media ==
=== Web novel ===
Written by BK_Moon, the web novel was serialized on Naver Corporation's web novel platform Naver Web Novel from June 3, 2019, to November 12, 2020. The web novel was published in English digitally by Yonder.

=== Manhwa ===
A manhwa adaptation, which was released as webtoon, adapted by Lee Hyun‑min, and illustrated by Kim Hyun‑soo, began serialization on Naver Corporation's webtoon platform Naver Webtoon on August 5, 2021. As of November 2025, the webtoon's individual chapters have been collected into seven volumes. An English translation is published digitally by Line Webtoon.

== Reception ==
Merlyn De Souza of ComicBook.com felt the story uses a generic premise but in a unique way. De Souza also felt the beginning of the story was hilarious and engaging. A columnist of Multiversity Comics felt the story was generic conventions combined in a "mildly intriguing" way. They also liked the artwork, describing the panels lush and detailed, and praising their drawing of the characters. They compared the design of the setting to Poldark. Cha Kyung-mo of The Hankyoreh liked the main character, particularly describing the way he solves problems in a unique manner. Aaheli Pradhan of FandomWire described it as "the One-Punch Man of the webtoon world", comparing their style of comedy and the role the illustrations have in it.
