= Let's Be Perverts =

Manhwa series

- Cover of the Net Comics edition of Let's Be Perverts vol. 1 (2006), art by Lee You-jung

변태가 되자 Byeontaega doeja
- Genre: Humor/comedy
- Author: Lee You-jung
- English publisher: (United States) Net Comics
- Other publishers: (Italy) Free Books
- Original run: 2006
- Volumes: 4

Let's Be Perverts (Korean: 변태가 되자) is a manhwa series created by Lee You-jung (이유정).

The series follows the life of the 17-year-old Perverto, who always encounters the unavoidable nickname "pervert" (변태 byeontae, which translates into Japanese as 変態 hentai). Contrary to this nickname, Perverto is actually quite naïve when it comes to sexual matters. Perverto transfers to a new school to escape the epithet, but his new math teacher revives it at the new school.
