= Kang Kyung-ok =

South Korean manhwa artist

Kang Kyung-ok 강경옥
- Born: October 16, 1965 (age 61)
- Notable works: Narration in Seventeen; Normal City

Kang Kyung-ok (born October 16, 1965) is a manhwa artist whose work It's Two People was adapted into the film Someone Behind You. She also has had work published by Netcomics.

== Works ==
- Narration in Seventeen (1991)
- Present Continuous (1991)
- Normal City (1993)
- In the Starlight (1996)
- It's Two People (1999)
- Seol Hui (2008)
