= Shin Ji-sang =

- Shin Su-mi
- Hangul: 신수미
- RR: Sin Sumi
- MR: Sin Sumi

Art name
- Hangul: 신지상
- RR: Sin Jisang
- MR: Sin Chisang

Shin Ji-sang (Korean: 신지상) is the pen name of manhwa artist Shin Su-mi. She debuted in 1991. Shin collaborated with Geo (real name Min Jung-Hwa) to publish Chocolat through Ice Kunion. They also collaborated to create the manhwa called Very! Very! SWEET!

== Career ==
Her early work reflected the unstableness of her 20s. She later gamed some fame due to the influence from the Korean Wave.

== Works ==
- Chocolat, volumes 1, 2, 3, 4, 5, 6, 7, 8
- Very! Very! Sweet, volumes 1, 2, 3, 4, 5, 6, 7, 8
- Rolling, volume 1
