= Sarasah =

South Korean manhwa

Sarasah is a Korean manhwa written by Ryu Ryang and published by Yen Press.

== Plot ==
Ji-Hae is a regular high school girl who has had a crush on Seung-Hyu for a very long time. Seung-Hyu has rejected Ji-Hae's public confessions of love on multiple occasions. After her last & most embarrassing declaration of love, Seung-Hyu lost his patience and pushed her, causing Ji-hae to fall down a flight of stairs to her death. In the afterlife, Ji-Hae is greeted by a couple of sympathetic gods who are touched by her unrequited feelings & untimely death. Looking at her spirit, they sense that Ji-Hae's problems were caused in a former life and therefore send her back in time.

After being sent back a few centuries, Ji-Hae wakes up in the body of her past life with a floral tattoo on her chest, which will gradually bloom more as someone falls deeper in love with her. She meets Seung-Hyu's past self, Ja-Yun, who is already in love with another girl who will eventually end up dying due to Ja-Yun's actions.

As a daughter to a high-ranking official, Ji-Hae disguises herself as a boy to join the Hwa Rang (local male educational facility) to get close to Ja-Yun. Ji-Hae's life becomes more complicated as she tries to balance her multiple identities (a modern girl from the future, a socially elite female and a lower-class young male with aspirations). She strikes up a close friendship with Ja-Yun's girlfriend, and attracts the affections of various different handsome young men.

As of January 2013, the story remains unfinished as only five volumes have been translated into English by Yen Press in 2009–2010, with no sign of further volumes being published.

== Characters ==
Ji-hae – A tomboyish girl who likes Seung-hyu but was pushed down from a flight of stairs that led to her death. When she was sent to the past, she grew her hair longer. She used the name Seung-hyu to be a "Nang-do".

Seung-hyu – The boy Ji-Hae has a crush on who pushed her down a flight of stairs leading to her death (it might have been accidental).

Ja-yun – The past self of Seung-Hyu. A boy who comes from a low-class background. He attends the Hwa Rang; he is also the reason Ji-Hae joins the Hwa Rang disguised as a boy. Currently thinks Ji-Hae is a boy. Finds out Ji-Hae is a girl later on. It seems that he fell in love with Ji-hae a little.

Bun Min Rang – A general in the Hwa Rang and the only one who knows Ji-Hae's secret. He fell in love with Ji-hae. He doesn't like Misa-heul very much. Has excellent skills in sword fighting

Misa-heul – A cold/smart guy. The leader of The Hwa-Rang's and he's also Ja-Yun's boss. Ji-Hae accidentally injures him with and arrow but later treats his wound. Also finds out Ji-Hae is a girl later on.

Lady Ari – Ji-hae's past self, she is the opposite of Ji-hae as she is feminine, smart and arrogant. She fell in love with Ja-yun, but was rejected and she was jealous of So-dan because she was his lover, so she paid So-dan's father to sell her to a noble who loves young beautiful girl and ended up (unintentionally) killing her.

So-dan – Seung-hyu's past lover. She is very beautiful and kind. In the past she was killed by Ari unintentionally. Her death is what led Seung-hyu to hate Ji-hae in the present.
