= Sora & Haena! =

South Korean manhwa series

- Cover of Volume 1
- Genre: Romantic comedy, girls' love
- Author: Jackbull
- Publisher: C&C Revolution
- English publisher: Comikey; Inklore
- Webtoon service: Ktoon
- Original run: April 6, 2020 – January 22, 2023

Sora & Haena! (Korean: 소라해나!) is a Korean girls' love manhwa series created by Jackbull. The manhwa was serialized online via Ktoon from April, 2021 to January, 2023. The story follows Sora, a shy high school student who makes an unlikely deal with the brash Haena to help her overcome her shyness in exchange for helping Haena study for her college entrance exams.

== Plot ==
Yoon Sora, the top student at the prestigious Munjeil Girls' High School, unexpectedly ends up making a deal with delinquent Woo Haena, if Sora can help Haena get into college then Haena will help Sora get a boyfriend. However, as Sora spends more time Haena she finds herself falling for her instead of the boy Haena agreed to help her pursue.

== Publication ==
Written and illustrated by Jackbull, Sora & Haena! was serialized online via Ktoon from April 6, 2020, to January 8, 2022. A sequel titled Ah-Young Jae-In? was later serialized from November 4, 2022, to January 22, 2023. The series has since been released on various other webtoon platforms following Ktoon's closure on December 31, 2025.

The manhwa was first published in English digitally by Comikey in 2023. Random House announced in 2025 that it had licensed the series for an English print publication under its Inklore imprint.

| No. | Release date | ISBN |
|---|---|---|
| 1 | July 14, 2026 | 9781807110024 |
| 2 | February 9, 2027 | 9781807110055 |
