= 13th Boy =

2009–2012 manhwa by SangEun Lee

- Cover of the Yen Press edition of 13th Boy vol. 1 (2009), art by SangEun Lee
- Genre: Mystery, Romance, Comedy, Fantasy, Supernatural,
- English publisher: (United States) Yen Press
- Original run: 2009–2012
- Volumes: 12

13th Boy (열세번째 남자, 13th Guy, Chàng trai thứ 13) is a 12-volume Korean manhwa written by SangEun Lee, published in English by Yen Press.

== Storyline ==
Hee-So Eun is determined to find her fated one; she has dated 12 boys so far, but to her, her love stops there. Hoping and trying to get back with boyfriend number 12, Won-Jun Kang, it seems as though it's going to be a difficult task. Not just because he is not interested anymore, but also because... what exactly lies in her past that she has forgotten? The only clue left is a very special gift, a mysterious boy, and her long-to-be remembered thoughts from before.

== Characters ==
Hee-So Eun

Hee-So, a 15-year-old girl who is trying to find the one, but is she looking in the right direction. Stubborn, clueless at times, mean, and crazy, she still manages to be loved by many. As the story progresses she manages to remember a few things that she has forgotten, but she still needs to learn a lot more at that. But what DOES she need to remember?

Whie-Young Jang

Whie-Young is a very mysterious person. Extremely popular with girls, but he doesn't seem to notice... or care, probably because he's truly focused on one girl that doesn't seem to be interested. He is a JERK in a lot of people's eyes, but that's really not his true nature. He is an important person as well because in the story there is something strange about him, that not only doesn't seem right, but something that not many know about, but what is his big secret? And why does he always act so strange around so many people?

Won-Jun Kang Won-Jun is a quiet boy. He is also popular with girls but no one ever approaches him because he always looks so cold, although no one really knows if that is true. He is a smart person who has done a couple of things in the past that he regrets and cannot ever turn back, but at least that's what he thinks.

Sae-Bom Son

Sae-Bom is a 15-year-old girl stuck in the past. Nothing ever really goes good for her, except for the attention she gets from certain people around her. She's lonely in a sort of way and just can't grow up, that is in some people's eyes, but there is a reason why and there is also someone who is at fault at that, but who and why?

Beatrice

Beatrice is a talking cactus that turns into a human once a month on a full moon. Beatrice is Hee-So's loyal sidekick as well as her little secret, always by her side when she's down, happy, angry, or just being an idiot even though she treats him like a slave. Beatrice has a secret of his own though and just like Hee-So, he must find the truth of his past but when he does, How will Hee-So react when he tells her and who is the one that made him the way he is?
