= Manta (platform) =

South Korean comic platform

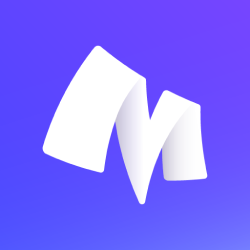
- Website type: Digital comics platform
- Available in: English, Spanish
- Owner: RIDI Corporation
- Founder: Kisik Bae
- Website: manta.net
- Registration: Optional
- Launched: November 2020
- Current status: Active

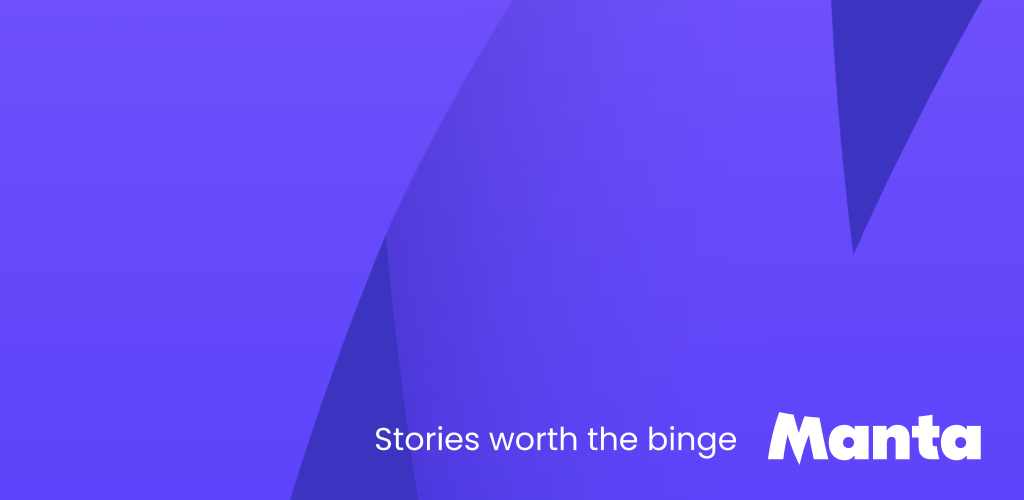
Logo

Manta is a South Korean digital comics (or webtoons, webcomics, manhwa) platform owned and operated by RIDI Corporation. It works with its own in-house studio as well as outside partners to create original digital comics.

== Service ==
Manta is a subscription-based service that allows all members to read unlimited amounts of content on its app at a fixed price. The app is available for Android and iOS devices, and all content can be viewed from its official website.

Manta is known to be the first subscription-based webcomic platform in the market.

Many of Manta's webcomics share the IP with those in Ridibooks, which is RIDI Corporation's domestic South Korean business. Main titles of Ridibooks such as Under the Oak Tree (상수리 나무 아래) and Lady Devil (마귀) are also well known globally through Manta.

The platform now serves both English and Spanish.

== History ==
Manta was founded by Kisik Bae, Founder and CEO of RIDI Corporation, in November 2020. In October 2023, Travis Kim, formerly with Amazon and LG Electronics, was appointed CEO of Manta.

RIDI Corporation initially established its presence in the industry as an e-book publisher, and over time, it expanded into other content domains, with a particular focus on webnovels. Later, RIDI Corporation, with an extensive portfolio of IP it has acquired, started to adapt the stories into digital comic formats. A significant portion of the comics published on Manta are Manta-owned, and they also do collaborate with external partners and license certain series from them.

It was a latecomer in the webcomic industry, but rather than pay-per-episode, Manta was one of the few subscription-based webcomics services available.

Four months after its launch in March 2021, Manta ranked first in the US Google Play Store's cartoon category.

== Content ==
Manta focuses mainly on bringing original stories from RIDI, a Korean digital content platform also owned by RIDI Corporation, into webcomics.

Most of Manta's titles are in the romance genre, with titles including Under the Oak Tree, a romance fantasy webcomic based on a web novel by Kim Suji, Disobey the Duke if you Dare, and Semantic Error, the latter having also been adapted into a live action streaming television series. It also offers stories in other genres including action, thriller, and horror.

The platform also works with third-party IP rights holders to extend existing films and live-action storytelling into webcomics, such as Svaha: the Sixth Finger and A Hard Day.

In Q3 2022, two volumes of Semantic Error were released as ebooks on Amazon Kindle, marking the series the first of Manta's titles to be published outside its platform. In March 2023, Manta announced that Disobey the Duke If You Dare would become its first title for distribution as printed graphic novels.

== Userbase ==
In an Interview, Kisik Bae said the app has reached five million downloads as of April 2022. The number has gone up to eight million in October 2022, then to 10 million by March 2023. In a June 2024 interview, Manta's CEO, Travis Kim, mentioned that the number has now increased to 15 million.

== See also ==
- Webtoon
- Webtoon (platform)
- Kakao Webtoon
