= Tappytoon =

South Korean digital webtoon platform

- Website type: Webtoon platform
- Available in: English, German, French
- Owner: Contents First Inc
- Creators: Ernest Woo and Sun Bang
- Website: https://www.tappytoon.com/en/comics/home
- Commercial: Yes
- Registration: Optional
- Launched: 2016 (English); 2020 (German, French)
- Current status: Active

Tappytoon is a South Korean digital webtoon platform that was developed and is operated by Contents First Inc., a venture-backed media and entertainment company founded in 2013.

In 2018, it was ranked the number one Android Comics App in both North America and Europe, and in the Top Five iPhone apps in the Book category. Tappytoon surpassed seven million registered users across 241 countries in November 2022.

== Content ==
Tappytoon offers English, French, and German titles licensed from South Korean and other Asian publishers, such as Kakao Entertainment, Mr. Blue, Jaedam, Haksan Publishing, and Comico. The platform also hosts comics that tie into other media like K-dramas, K-pop, and games. Tappytoon may also consider titles depending on reader needs and requests.

Its Tappytoon Studio imprint, which allows creators to publish original works, began July 2021. A month later, Tappytoon launched its webnovel service. According to Tappytoon co-founder Sun Bang, "having both the novel and webtoon versions creates a synergy so that readers from one version can easily try out the other format, and they end up enjoying both."

As of December 2022, 78.6% of Tappytoon's readers were from the United States, and the most popular genres of content with Americans were romance (at 57%), boys' love (at 17%), action (at 12%), and "other" (at 14%).

In interviews with co-founders Ernest Woo and Sun Bang, Tappytoon felt that female readers were overlooked by American superheroes and comics, and so made a conscious effort to attract that demographic to their platform via quality, female-centered stories whose main leads "are out to take charge of their life and love, protect someone, and right some wrong, whether personal or a more significant issue....Empowerment, inspiration, catharsis, and even humor, it's all there, and it resonates with our female readers."

== Adaptations into other media ==
=== Paperback editions ===
- The Legend of the Northern Blade,an adaptation of Woogack's Buk-geomjeon-gi novel series, was published in Korea in book format by Seoul Media Comics (서울미디어코믹스).
- Bloody Sweet, was published in paperback format by C&C Revolution, Inc. Two volumes were financed via Kickstarter campaigns. C&C Revolution, Inc. has since been acquired by Tappytoon. In November 2022, Yen Press announced that they would be publishing the title in paperback as well.
- Yen Press, as well as its Ize Press imprint, has collected and published in paperback format some of Tappytoon's other titles as well. These include:
  - A Returner's Magic Should Be Special
  - Daughter of the Emperor
  - Solo Leveling
  - The Abandoned Empress
  - The Reason Why Raeliana Ended Up at the Duke's Mansion
  - Who Made Me a Princess

=== TV shows ===
What's Wrong with Secretary Kim? and Cherry Blossoms After Winter were adapted into live-action dramas in 2018 and 2022 respectively.
