= Tapas (website) =

Webcomics hosting website

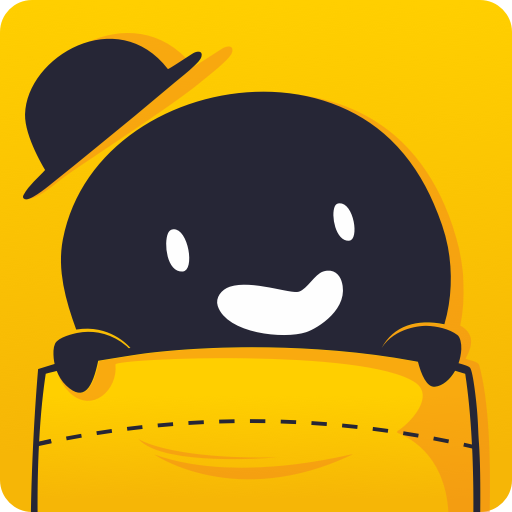
- Icon of the Tapas app
- Website type: Webcomic platform
- Available in: English
- Owner: Kakao Entertainment
- Creators: Chang Kim; Young-Jun Jang
- Parent: Tapas Entertainment
- Website: tapas.io
- Commercial: Yes
- Registration: Optional
- Launched: 2012
- Current status: Active

Tapas, formerly known as Tapastic and originally known as Comic Panda, (Note: Comic Panda should not be confused with Big Panda, a webcomics portal which was operating in the late 1990s.) is a South Korean webtoon and prose publishing website and app owned by Tapas Entertainment, a subsidiary of Kakao Entertainment. It was created in 2012 by entrepreneurs Young-Jun Jang and Chang Kim, who is currently Tapas Media's CEO.

As of February 2021 the website reports that it hosts English-language works by over 61,000 creators. Most of the works on Tapas are in romance and fantasy genres. Tapas reports that around 63% of creators on its service are women and that the majority of its users are women aged 18–24. Around 80% of its works are comics, while the rest are prose.

The site works on a freemium business model; many series have the first few episodes available for free but further episodes must be purchased. Tapas reported that in 2020, users in total typically spent US$50,000–$70,000 each day on the service, and over that year Tapas paid US$14 million to creators.

In 2026, it was reported that Tapas's owner Kakao planned to shut down the platform.

== History ==
"We discovered a lot of people still use print publishing, and paid their own money to print comics ... Or people start their own website, in which case you have to build your audience, think about mobile, pay for hosting. It just doesn't really work out."

— Chang Kim

Tapas was founded by San Francisco-based Korean entrepreneur Chang Kim and Young-Jun Jang in 2012, initially under the name Comic Panda. The Wall Street Journal described Kim as a "serial entrepreneur"; he was once in charge of Samsung's mobile content strategy, and he sold his Korean blogging company TNC to Google and also worked for Google on Blogger.

Kim became a fan of webtoons during his college years, and came up with the idea of an open-publishing platform after wondering if there was a single online location to read all the webcomics he was a fan of. Kim drew parallels to YouTube, a site where people can upload their video content and earn money, and noted that such a model for comics hosting was already successful in South Korea. The site's name later changed to "Tapastic"; Kim based the name on the snack food tapas, to indicate the site provided bite-sized entertainment, and the word "fantastic". As of 2014, the company was based in Santa Clara, California, USA.

By 2015 the company had received $3.4 million USD in backing from both American and Korean investors, including from South Korean internet company Daum Kakao and from former Facebook Chief Technology Officer Adam D'Angelo. This included $2 million USD of Series A funding which Tapastic received in 2014 through a partnership with Daum Communications. Through this partnership, Tapastic hoped to bring over successful Korean titles to see if they could find success in the United States market, such as Like a Wolf, one of the most popular webcomics in South Korea.

In April 2016, Tapas Media released a new mobile app, titled "Tapas". The app was announced on a freemium business model; according to Tapas Media, around 10–20% of the works were offered for free – either directly free, or unlockable as rewards for engagement with the app – with the rest of the works requiring payment. CEO Chang Kim specifically cited Candy Crush as a model for the app, for its freemium model and for providing three to five minutes of engagement, which he said they were trying to mimic with the amount of content in each "bite-sized micro chapter".

On April 17, 2017, the company announced that it had changed its website name to Tapas, redesigning parts of their website in the process. Tapas Media changed its terms of service the same day: the addition of a "Right of First Refusal" clause spurred controversy among the service' users. According to this clause, users who wanted to sell the rights to works that had been hosted on Tapas had to offer them to Tapas Media first, and then negotiate with the company "in good faith". Users could only sell rights to a third party if Tapas declined to buy the rights or if 30 days passed without agreement. Tapas released a statement in May 2017, saying that the Right of First Refusal was "not to take any rights away or steal your content. The purpose is to help you." Tapas stated that the change of terms was to prevent creators accepting bad deals and instead to allow them to use Tapas' connections to "get the best deal possible." However, Tapas removed its right of first refusal requirement on May 18, 2017, due to the poor community reception.

In May 2021, Kakao Entertainment agreed to acquire U.S.-based digital storytelling platforms Tapas and Radish. The Tapas acquisition valued the company at approximately US$510 million, while Radish was valued at approximately US$440 million. The acquisitions expanded Kakao Entertainment's webtoon and web novel operations into North America and provided platforms for distributing Korean intellectual property alongside content from local creators.

In September 2026, Kakao Entertainment announced plans to wind down Tapas, its North American webtoon platform, following the closure of the web novel service Radish in 2025. Kakao Entertainment had acquired Tapas and Radish in 2021 for a combined approximately ₩1.1 trillion (US$820.73 million), but subsequently scaled back its strategy of directly operating content platforms in North America. Tapas had previously recorded a ₩46 billion (US$34.32 million) goodwill impairment in 2023. The closure forms part of a broader restructuring in which Kakao Entertainment plans to consolidate its webtoon and web novel services around KakaoPage by the end of 2026. The company said the integration would combine content, user data, artificial intelligence and operational capabilities across its platforms. Its international strategy is increasingly focused on intellectual property and established businesses such as Piccoma in Japan rather than direct operation of overseas platforms. The restructuring coincides with Kakao's proposed 2027 corporate split into Kakao AI and Kakao X. Kakao Entertainment is expected to become part of Kakao X, alongside other entertainment and investment businesses, with the company pursuing further efficiency measures and consolidation of its content operations. On October 1, provision of the in-app currency was discontinued, and the date of shutdown was announced to be March 31, 2027 at 23:59 Pacific Time. Content and users' unlocks will not be carried over to KakaoPage, but support services were provided to help creators migrate their content, including to cancel exclusivity contracts. Chang Kim criticized Kakao for its arbitrary decision to consolidate its web publishing outlets and the unclear, poorly communicated announcements that resulted in unnecessarily bad PR.

== Content ==
Tapas published comics from over 6,000 creators as of 2015, and from over 16,000 creators as of 2016. As of February 2021, Tapas reports that it hosts work from over 61,000 creators. Most of its works are in the romance and fantasy genres. Of the works on the system, 80 percent is in comic form while 20 percent is prose. Tapas also includes a "Mature" section on its website (but not on its app), dedicated to explicit content. According to Tapas, 63 percent of its creators are female.

In an interview, Chang Kim said that their revenue model of providing a few free chapters then requiring payment to continue means that works that grab readers immediately are preferred, saying, "In print, stories can have a slow buildup, but our series need to hook readers from the first chapter, because people are quick to decide if a story is for them or not." Tapas provides assistance for creators to optimize their work for the audience, including formatting stories to ensure they work best when read on phones. The website has formed an interactive community, with fans discussing the comics and some creators asking for fan feedback.

All works on Tapas are in English. Some of the comics on the site are translated from other languages. Tapastic has offered a translation service for Korean and French creators.

In a 2016 review, Caitlin Rosberg of The A.V. Club said that "[the] mobile app... is absolutely the future for most comic content, but [Tapas] has a steep but fast learning curve if you read comics on the website instead."

Yen Press, under its Ize Press imprint for Korean content, has collected and published several of Tapas' works into paperback format. These include:

- Villains Are Destined to Die
- Tomb Raider King
- A Business Proposal
- The Beginning After the End

== Financial model ==
Tapas operates on a freemium model; some series on Tapas are free to read, while some provide the first few issues for free then require payment to continue reading. The Tapas app has an in-app currency called "Ink", which users can purchase with money or earn through certain actions such as watching video ads. Ink can be used to unlock episodes of a series, and can also be directly given to creators. Tapas earns money through the purchase of Ink, the sale of advertising slots, and merchandise, and may also earn money through deals that license Tapas comics for physical publishing, TV or movies. For example, Tapas announced a deal in December 2020 to publish the comic Magical Boy by The Kao (also called Vincent Kao) as a graphic novel through Scholastic.

Creators may earn money through a number of means. Creators with a work that has at least 100 subscribers earn about 70 percent of ad revenue. When users pay to access an episode or series, creators receive 50 percent of that payment. Creators can also ask for one-off donations from readers if they have at least 250 subscribers. Creators retain ownership of their works and may also profit from selling licenses of their media for movie and TV adaptations.

While Tapas does not make its financial data public, it reported that in 2020 users typically spent $50,000–$70,000 USD in total each day on the service.

In 2015, the WSJ reported that some artists on Tapas were making around US$800 per month on the service; after 2020, the company announced that in that year it had paid US$14 million to creators.

== Market share ==
According to Publishers Weekly in April 2016, Tapas had over a million active readers, most of which were from North America and 90% of which were under the age of 34. In 2021, Tapas said that the majority of Tapas readers are women aged 18–24. CEO Chang Kim said that reaching this demographic, "wasn't our intention" but that fantasy and romance perform the best and is popular with this demographic.

One of Tapas' main competitors is Naver's Webtoon, which launched in English in 2014. In 2015, data compiled by Alexa Rankings and reported by The Wall Street Journal showed that Line Webtoon was slightly ahead of Tapastic in the total number of global visitors, while Tapastic was just ahead of Webtoon in the United States. In 2016, Publishers Weekly called Tapastic "the leading online publishing platform and community for comics."

== Audience and commercial performance ==
Year	Metric	Figure	Description
2016	Active readers	1 million+	Primarily North American readers; 90% were under 34.
2019	Monthly active users	2.2 million	Tapas also reported nearly 250% year-on-year revenue growth.
2020	Creator payments	US$14 million	Total payments to creators during the year; the platform also reached 100 million paid episode unlocks.
2021	Monthly views	246 million+	Tapas also reported nine million registered users and 99,000 series.
2024	Daily transaction volume	₩200 million+	Reached a 43% year-on-year increase in transaction volume.
2026	Registered users	10 million+	Tapas also had 75,000 creators and 100,000 titles, according to figures released by the company.

== End of service ==
On 1 October 2026, Tapas announced that it would wind down its platform after more than a decade of operation, with the service scheduled to end on 31 March 2027. The announcement ended the availability of new Ink purchases, although users could continue using their remaining balance to unlock episodes until the closure date.

According to the company's FAQ, previously unlocked content would no longer be accessible after the service ended. Creators could continue publishing new material during the wind-down period, while existing titles would remain available until the closure unless removed earlier.

== See also ==
- WEBTOON, another webtoon publishing service
- Webtoon, a term for web-published comics from South Korea or Korean owned websites
