= Netcomics =

American publishing company

- Founded: 2005
- Founder: Heewoon Chung
- Defunct: December 29, 2024
- Country of origin: United States
- Headquarters location: Los Angeles, California
- Distribution: Diamond Book Distributors
- Publication types: manga, manhwa
- Fiction genres: Boy's Love, Romance, Action
- Owner(s): Heewoon Chung
- Official website: www.netcomics.com

Netcomics was a publisher of manhwa, webtoons, manga, and comics in the United States, based in Los Angeles, CA, which contributed to the Korean Wave. South Korean publisher Ecomix Media Company created Netcomics, with the first titles appearing in the first quarter of 2006 and they were considered one of the pioneers in digital publication of manhwa.

They offered a variety of English titles that could be either rented or purchased on their homepage or app.

Netcomics served as a distributor for some titles by manga publisher Aurora Publishing until Aurora's closure in April 2010.

Netcomics ended service on December 29, 2024.
