= Piccoma =

Japanese webtoon subscription service

- Developer: Kakao Piccoma Corp.
- Release: April 2016
- Operating system: iOS, Android
- Available in: Japanese, French
- Type: webtoon, manga
- Website: piccoma.com

Piccoma (Japanese: ピッコマ, Hepburn: Pikkoma) is a Japanese digital comic app that is available on smartphones, tablets, and personal computers. It was developed and released by Kakao Piccoma Corp., the Japanese subsidiary of Kakao.

== Service ==
When the service was first launched, it offered a regular model of buying each individual manga and volume similar to other online shops but it has since moved to adopt the webtoon model where a user can purchase individual chapters and wait 24 hours to read some for free. Korean webtoons that are offered on Kakao's services (Daum Webtoon and KakaoPage) are offered through Piccoma in Japanese. Kakao Japan announced that it would start offering original Japanese, Korean, and Chinese webtoons for Piccoma in Q3 2018. Kakao Japan changed its name to Kakao Piccoma Corporation in November 2021.

In 2018, they founded the manga award "Piccoma AWARD".

In November 2021, Piccoma announced its expansion in Europe and North America; in September of the same year, it established a local subsidiary in France. On March 17, 2021, Kakao launched its French language service of Piccoma, which includes translated webtoons as well as translated manga.

On 27 May, 2024, Piccoma Europe announces that it will be forced to cease all its operations, which will result in the definitive closure of the platform and the definitive termination of the Piccoma service on September 30, 2024, at 11:59 pm. This was the result of a desire to downsize or shut down unprofitable overseas units. Since September 30, the app and website are no longer accessible in France.

== See also ==
- Kakao Webtoon
- KakaoPage
- Line Manga
