= Lezhin Comics =

South Korean webtoon portal

Lezhin Entertainment
- Industry: Webtoons
- Founded: 2013
- Founder: Han Hee-sung
- Headquarters: Seoul
- Parent: KidariStudio, Inc.
- Subsidiaries: Lezhin Studio
- Website: www.lezhinus.com/en

Lezhin Comics is a webtoon portal that was founded by South Korean blogger Han Hee-sung in 2013. It is based in South Korea and its services are offered in Korean, Japanese, German and English.

== History ==
Han Hee-sung, a Korean blogger, launched Lezhin Comics in June 2013. By November 2014, it hosted over 400 webtoons and cartoons, making it South Korea's largest webtoon publisher as of 2014. The content is created by professional and amateur cartoonists including 2013 Korea Content Awards winner Lee Jin-young (Yool Lee) and 2014 Today's Cartoon Award winner Yoo Ayoung.

In April 2015, Lezhin Comics launched its services in Japan. It first started as a beta site, before an official website was opened in July.

In December 2015, Lezhin Comics expanded its services to include English speaking regions.

In May 2017, it became the largest shareholder in management agency UL Entertainment.

In April 2019, it founded a drama and film production company Lezhin Studio. It is led by former Warner Bros. Pictures Korea and NEW executive Byun Sung-min.

In February 2021, reports confirmed that KidariStudio, Inc. completed their acquisition of Lezhin Entertainment, Inc. for approximately KRW 130 billion on December 14, 2020.

== Controversies ==
In September 2017, Lezhin faced a scandal regarding their treatment of Gray (회색), the author of Records of the Cold Moon (월한강천록), who announced on Twitter at the end of her contract with Lezhin that she was forced to work on her webtoon, despite her reporting that she had cancer.

In September 2017, the Korean Webtoon Authors Association posted a statement regarding problems in Lezhin's late penalty fee. The late penalty fee charged the artist up to 9% of their monthly income should they give their manuscript late by more than two days after the due date. In November 2017, Lezhin released a statement announcing that the late penalty would be discontinued by February 1, 2018, to allow a three-month period to negotiate contracts with the artists.

In December 2017, an article reported a blacklist Lezhin had for their artists, which specifically excluded them from advertisements and promotional events. Lezhin responded by denying the existence of the blacklist. In January 2018, SBS reported a leaked email to exclude several works from the main page and any promotional works.

In January 2018, Lezhin announced that their contracts with authors EunSong and Michii would be terminated on February 6. Both authors stated that they were informed not by Lezhin but by their social media accounts. Lezhin later stated that they would take legal action against EunSong and Michii for the spread of false rumors.

On January 11, a protest was held in front of the Lezhin office for the legal action and treatment against the authors. A forum organized by the culture ministry was held late in the month to address the issue of abusive practices within the industry.

In July 2018, Lezhin's CEO Hee-Sung Han officially acknowledged and apologized for the allegation that it created a blacklist of creators that gave them a disadvantages in the exposure and advertisements of their works as well as the confusion caused to writers after the sudden discontinuation of its web novel platform.
