= Yen Plus =

American manga and manhwa magazine

- Cover of the first issue of Yen Plus featuring Maka and Soul Eater from Soul Eater. Illustration by Atsushi Okubo.
- Categories: Manga, manhwa, OEL manga
- Frequency: Monthly
- Publisher: Yen Press
- First issue: July 29, 2008
- Final issue: July 2010 (print); December 2013 (online)
- Country: United States
- Language: English
- Website: yenpress.com/yenplus/
- ISSN: 1942-440X

Yen Plus was an American monthly anthology magazine of Japanese manga, Korean manhwa, and original English-language (OEL) manga published by Yen Press.

== History ==
The first issue of Yen Plus went on sale on July 29, 2008, with five manga titles originally published by Gangan Comics, four manhwa titles, and two OEL manga titles. The magazine contained over 450 pages per issue. Manga titles were read from right-to-left, while manhwa and OEL manga titles read left-to-right; because of this, each issue had two covers.

Although Yen Plus did not publicize official circulation figures, Hachette Book Group publicity materials for the Maximum Ride OEL manga reported a circulation figure for Yen Plus of "nearly 100,000 copies" as of late 2008.

The July 2010 issue was the last issue of the physical magazine to be published; all subsequent issues were exclusively published online. In December 2013, the online magazine also folded.

== Serialized titles ==
This is a complete list of all titles serialized in Yen Plus. It does not include single chapter previews of titles. Twenty titles (ten manga, six manhwa and four OEL manga) were serialized, but only two (the manhwa One Fine Day and Pig Bride) were serialized in their entirety.

Manga

Title	Author	Artist	First Issue	Last Issue	Completed?
Bamboo Blade	Masahiro Totsuka	Aguri Igarashi	August 2008	May 2009	No
Black Butler	Yana Toboso		August 2009	July 2010	No
Higurashi When They Cry	Ryukishi07	Various	August 2008	January 2009	No
Hero Tales	Huang Jin Zhou	Hiromu Arakawa	February 2009	April 2010	No
K-On!	Kakifly		September 2010	December 2013	No
Nabari no Ou	Yuhki Kamatani		August 2008	Unknown	No
Pandora Hearts	Jun Mochizuki		June 2009	Unknown	No
Soul Eater	Atsushi Okubo		August 2008	Unknown	No
Sumomomo Momomo	Shinobu Ohtaka		August 2008	October 2009	No
Yotsuba&!	Kiyohiko Azuma		September 2010	December 2013	No

Manhwa

Title	Author	Artist	First Issue	Last Issue	Completed?
Aron's Absurd Armada	MiSun Kim		August 2010	December 2013	No
Jack Frost	Jinho Ko		August 2008	December 2013	No
One Fine Day	Sirial		August 2008	July 2010	Yes
Pig Bride	Huh Kook-hwa	Kim Su-jin	August 2008	July 2010	Yes
Sarasah	Ryu Ryang		August 2008	June 2009	No
Time and Again	JiUn Yun		February 2009	December 2013	No

OEL manga

Title	Author	Artist	First Issue	Last Issue	Completed?
Daniel X	SeungHui Kye		August 2010	December 2013	No
Gossip Girl	HyeKyung Baek		January 2010	December 2013	No
Maximum Ride	Narae Lee		August 2008	December 2013	No
Nightschool	Svetlana Chmakova		August 2008	December 2013	No

== See also ==
- List of manga magazines published outside of Japan
