= Hiraeth: The End of the Journey =

Japanese manga series

- Cover of the first tankōbon volume

ヒラエスは旅路の果て (Hiraesu wa Tabiji no Hate)
- Genre: Drama
- Manga
- Written by: Yuhki Kamatani
- Published by: Kodansha
- English publisher: NA: Kodansha USA
- Imprint: Morning KC
- Magazine: Monthly Morning Two
- Original run: October 22, 2020 – May 20, 2022
- Volumes: 3
- icon

Hiraeth: The End of the Journey (Japanese: ヒラエスは旅路の果て, Hepburn: Hiraesu wa Tabiji no Hate) is a Japanese manga series written and illustrated by Yuhki Kamatani. It was serialized in Kodansha's seinen manga magazine Monthly Morning Two from October 2020 to May 2022, with its chapters collected in three tankōbon volumes. The story follows a god, an immortal, and a suicidal girl who travel together.

== Plot ==
Mika, a junior high student, is grieving the loss of her best friend and determined to reunite with her in death. However, her path collides with an unnamed god journeying to Yomi (the land of the dead) and their companion Hibino, an immortal man who is following the god in hopes of learning how to finally end his own life. Together, the three travel by motorbike to Shimane Prefecture, where the entrance to Yomi is said to be located.

== Publication ==
Written and illustrated by Yuhki Kamatani, Hiraeth: The End of the Journey was serialized in Kodansha's seinen manga magazine Monthly Morning Two from October 22, 2020, to May 20, 2022. Kodansha collected its chapters in three tankōbon volumes, released from April 23, 2021, to August 23, 2022.

In North America, the series is licensed by Kodansha USA. The three volumes were released from March 29, 2022, to February 21, 2023.

=== Volumes ===
| No. | Original release date | Original ISBN | English release date | English ISBN |
|---|---|---|---|---|
| 1 | April 23, 2021 | 978-4-06-522827-2 | March 29, 2022 | 978-1-63699-542-7 |
| 2 | November 22, 2021 | 978-4-06-516903-2 | July 12, 2022 | 978-1-68491-351-0 |
| 3 | August 23, 2022 | 978-4-06-528965-5 | February 21, 2023 | 978-1-68491-712-9 |

== Reception ==
Hiraeth: The End of the Journey was one of the Jury Recommended Works at the 25th Japan Media Arts Festival in 2021.
