= Pig Bride =

Manhwa by Huh Kook-hwa

정체불명 새색시 RR: Jeongchebulmyeong saesaeksi MR: Chŏngch'ebulmyŏng saesaeksi
- Genre: Romantic comedy
- Author: Huh Kook-hwa
- Illustrator: Kim Su-jin
- Publisher: (South Korea) Haksan Publishing
- English publisher: (United States) (Canada) Yen Press
- Magazine: (South Korea) Party (파티) (United States) (Canada) Yen Plus
- Collected volumes: 5

Pig Bride (Korean: 정체불명 새색시) is a manhwa written and illustrated by Huh Kook-hwa (허국화) and Kim Su-jin (김수진). The story follows Si-Joon Lee, who was tricked as an eight-year-old boy, into fulfilling a prophecy and marrying the mysterious "Pig Bride"—a young blonde girl who hides her supposedly disfigured face under a pig-faced mask. When Si-Joon turns sixteen, the Bride reappears and causes havoc, interrupting the blossoming romance between Si-Joon and classmate Doe-Doe.

The series was released in five volumes between 2007 and 2008 in South Korea by Haksan Publishing and later localized by Yen Press for North American distribution. Yen Press also serialized Pig Bride in Yen Plus, a manga anthology. Yen Press's localization kept the Korean onomatopoeia and sound effects and used Anglicization followed by the English translation. Reception of the initial volumes was mixed and the entire series was reviewed negatively by Manga Critic's Katherine Dacey as one of the worst manga of 2009. The artwork and styling received mixed praise, but the manhwa-style artwork was noted to be a divisive aspect for readers.

== Characters ==
Si-Joon Lee
Male protagonist. Only child, 16 years old, of a Korean Senator with Presidential aspirations. When he was much younger he got lost in the mountains. A woman asks if he has heard the legend of the Park bride. She tells him that he is the 36th son of Si-Baek Lee of the tale, her daughter wearing a pig mask is the reincarnation of the woman of the story, cursed, and that the curse is lifted if Si-Joon marries her. He gets roped into it, but does not have to consummate it until he turns 16.

Mu-Yeon Park
Female protagonist. The reincarnation of the female protagonist of 'The Tale of the Park Bride'. Is never clearly seen without a pig mask up through volume 4, appears without a mask in the last volume, volume 5.

Ji-Oh Yun
Si-Joon Lee's roommate, and his best friend. More sober and rational than Si-Joon. He too has rich parents.

Doe-Doe Eun
The leading girl at the school, and presumes to be Si-Joon Lee's girlfriend. He does not dispute that. Hence a rival to Mu-Yeon Park. She is the adopted daughter of a rich couple.

Princess Ki-Ryong
Thirty-six generations ago the antagonist in 'The Legend of the Park Bride', and in the current era the antagonist against Si-Joon Lee and Mu-Yeon Park. The climax of her story is in volume 4.

Mu-Hwa Park
Mu-Yeon Park's stony faced sister, a swords-woman.

Kuem-Ja Kim
The School Principal. She becomes important to the story starting in Volume 4.

Pres. Jung
A company president and very wealthy. Si-Joon's maternal grandfather and the root of Si-Joon's family's wealth. He becomes important to the story in Volume 5.

== Plot ==
Rebellious and spoiled eight-year-old Si-Joon Lee is sent to a summer camp in the mountains by his senator father. He escapes and finds himself lost, but is saved when he finds a house in the middle of nowhere. A mysterious woman who lives there reveals to him that he is part of an ancient prophecy and must marry her daughter, Mu-Yeon, a descendant of the Park family of the 'Park Bride' folktale. The daughter is a small girl of Si-Joon's age who hides her face behind a smiling pig mask. Tempted by food, Si-Joon agrees to the marriage. That night, Mu-Yeon tells him she will meet him on his sixteenth birthday. True to her words, on his sixteenth birthday, she appears before Si-Joon with her sister and bodyguard, Mu-Hwa. A holy priest who serves Si-Joon's family reveals that the marriage must commence and the prophecy must be fulfilled or Si-Joon will die before the year ends. Si-Joon attempts to live his life normally, but begins to experience recurrences involving his past life and Mu-Yeon.

The last volume's last chapter reveals Si-Joon and Mu-Yeon going to the countryside for a year of getting the spoiled upbringing out of him. They encounter Doe-Doe Eun, whose adoptive parents gave away all their money and went abroad when the scandal involving Doe-Doe and her birth mother came out, and Doe-Doe had to change schools to one in this village. Si-Joon takes pity on Doe-Doe and sends her to live with Ji-Oh Yun in his parents' mansion. Ji-Oh is already hosting Mu-Hwa and he hopes that no conflicts occur. The last page indicates that Si-Joon's and Mu-Yeon's life together will not be smooth. The epilogue on the last page glimpses 25 years into the future to reveal that Mu-Yeon became South Korea's first female president, Si-Joon became a successful businessman who "works behind the scenes" to support Mu-Yeon, Ji-Oh became a doctor, Mu-Hwa became the head of Secret Service, and Doe-Doe became a banker.

== Production ==
Huh had difficulty in designing the Pig Girl's mask and attempted several different designs which were rejected before arriving at the chosen mask, but cannot imagine Mu-Yeon wearing any other mask now. Yen Press licensed Pig Bride for an English-language release in North America and began serializing it in the manga anthology Yen Plus. The final issue of Yen Plus in July 2010 contained the conclusion to Pig Bride. The English localization process included Korean onomatopoeia and sound effects with the anglicized word followed by the English translations. Signage and text is commonly written with English translations in or near the panel it appears instead of replacing the original text.

== Volume list ==
No.	Original release date	Original ISBN	North America release date	North America ISBN
01	April 25, 2007	9788952998033	April 2009	9780759529564
02	September 15, 2007	9788925802268	August 2009	9780759529557
03	February 25, 2008	9788925809687	December 2009	9780316077705
04	July 15, 2008	9788925817194	April 2010	9780316077729
05	October 25, 2008	9788925822396	July 2010	9780316077736

== Reception ==
Joy Kim of Manga Life also praised the art style saying the characters were distinctive. She criticized the relationship of the lead couple, Si-Joon Lee and Mu-Yeon Park, saying that Mu-Yeon should not be so sweet and protective of someone who does not return her feelings. Kim praised the character Ji-Oh Yun as the most interesting character in the series and that his relationship with Mu-Hwa Park is interesting. Melinda Beasi of Manga Bookshelf reviewed the first volume and concluded that despite being "somewhat muddled, the visual storytelling is not. The art is clean, lovely, and easy to follow, with a nicely restrained use of elaborate backgrounds and imaginative panel layouts. The character designs are pretty, distinct, and occasionally even creepy, as with Mu-Yeon's eternally smiling mask. The overall look is undeniably "manhwa" – a draw for some and a turn-off for others." Erin Jones of Mania.com noted the distinct and typical romance story in the first volume, but found the first volume enjoyable and noted that the interactions of the "Pig Girl" are what will drive the series despite the volume ending without strong development of the characters. A review of volume two by Pop Culture Shock gave it a "B+" despite confusion caused by the plot and "vagueness on the villain front, Pig Bride is still a very entertaining tale."

The series was received negatively by Katherine Dacey of Mangacritic.com where it was listed as fifth on Manga Critic's "The 2009 Manga Hall of Shame Inductees". Dacey criticized the series' lack of comedy, art style, and the personality of girls stating the author must hate girls. Kurt Hassler of Yen Press rebutted Mangacritics review and disagreed and praised the characters and the art style. Hassler's response to the review led to Dacey modifying her review to specify it was not hatred of women, but of the characters. Hassler also highlighted a quote from a review by Julie Opipari of Manga Maniac Cafe, a personal website, which stated, "The art alone makes this title worthy of a read, with its fine lines, elegant details, and overall attractiveness…the vision revealed inside this book is gorgeous. Dramatic and comedic scenes are played out with equal effectiveness, making the visuals a joy to behold."
