= Nabari no Ou =

Japanese manga series

- First tankōbon volume cover, featuring Miharu Rokujou

隠の王 (Nabari no Ō)
- Genre: Martial arts; Supernatural
- Manga
- Written by: Yuhki Kamatani
- Published by: Square Enix
- English publisher: NA: Yen Press
- Magazine: Monthly GFantasy
- English magazine: NA: Yen Plus
- Original run: May 18, 2004 – August 18, 2010
- Volumes: 14
- Anime television series
- Directed by: Kunihisa Sugishima
- Produced by: Mie Ide; Yūji Matsukura
- Written by: Michiko Yokote
- Music by: Michiru Oshima
- Studio: J.C.Staff
- Licensed by: NA: Funimation; UK: Manga Entertainment
- Original network: TXN (TV Tokyo)
- English network: US: Funimation Channel
- Original run: April 6, 2008 – September 28, 2008
- Episodes: 26
- icon

Nabari no Ou (Japanese: 隠の王, Hepburn: Nabari no Ō; lit. 'King of Nabari') is a Japanese manga series written and illustrated by Yuhki Kamatani. It was serialized in Square Enix's shōnen manga magazine Monthly GFantasy from May 2004 to August 2010, with its chapters collected in 14 tankōbon volumes. In North America, it was licensed for English release by Yen Press. A 26-episode anime television series animated by J.C.Staff and directed by Kunihisa Sugishima was broadcast on TV Tokyo from April to September 2008. In North America, the anime series was licensed by Funimation.

== Plot ==
Miharu Rokujou is a disaffected Japanese high school student who remains indifferent to the world around him. His life changes when he is rescued from an attack by Koichi Aizawa and Tobari Kumohira, ninja from Banten Village. They inform him that his body harbors the Shinra Bansho, a sacred scroll containing the most powerful secret art in the hidden world of Nabari. The Grey Wolves, a faction aligned with Iga Village, seek to claim the Shinra Bansho for their own ambitions, forcing Miharu into hiding as returning to his ordinary life becomes impossible. Though Miharu expresses no desire to engage with the ninja world, Tobari pledges to protect him until he ascends as Nabari's ruler. Miharu, however, requests the removal of the Shinra Bansho, a feat never before accomplished. Shortly afterward, Raimei Shimizu, a samurai from Fuuma Village, arrives to assess Miharu's capabilities. Recognizing his predicament, she invites the Banten ninja to consult Kotarou Fuuma, the leader of Fuuma Village and the foremost scholar of ninjutsu, who may hold the key to extracting the Shinra Bansho.

Upon arriving at Fuuma Village, they discover the Grey Wolves are also searching for the village's forbidden art. The group is ambushed by Yoite, a Grey Wolf operative who wields the forbidden Kira technique, capable of erasing a target's existence. After a brief confrontation, the assailants retreat, leading the Banten and Fuuma ninja to realize the Grey Wolves are gathering forbidden arts in hopes of forcibly removing the Shinra Bansho. Both factions resolve to do the same. After returning to Banten Village, Miharu is confronted by Yoite, who demands that his existence be erased. Threatened with the deaths of Tobari, Aizawa, and Raimei, Miharu reluctantly agrees to master the Shinra Bansho's power to fulfill Yoite's wish. As the factions continue their search for forbidden arts, Yoite defects from the Grey Wolves alongside his caretaker Kazuhiko Yukimi and physician Kazuho Amatsu after learning of the faction's intent to eliminate him. Meanwhile, Raiko Shimizu and Gau Meguro abandon the Grey Wolves as well, joining Raimei to revive the nearly extinct Shimizu clan.

Aizawa and Shijima Kurookano are revealed to have attained immortality long ago through the Shinra Bansho's power, and they subsequently sever ties with Banten. During an assault by the Grey Wolves, Yoite perishes after overusing Kira, a technique that consumes the user's lifespan. Honoring his final wish, Miharu erases Yoite's existence. Kotarou Fuuma is later exposed as a collaborator with the Grey Wolves, prompting Tobari to develop a ninjutsu capable of extracting the Shinra Bansho. Before doing so, he intends to restore the memories lost by all inhabitants of Nabari using Banten's forbidden art. A decade earlier, Tobari and his grandfather had attempted to remove the Shinra Bansho from Miharu's mother, Asahi. Before they could succeed, Miharu's father, Tobari's grandfather, and Miharu himself were slain by a mysterious assailant. Driven to madness, Asahi revived Miharu at the cost of her own life, inadvertently transferring the Shinra Bansho to him. In the present, as Tobari prepares to extract the scroll, the cloaked figure reappears—revealed to be Fuuma himself.

Miharu retreats inward, where Asahi confronts the Shinra Bansho within his consciousness. The scroll urges Miharu to remain isolated, while Asahi implores him to trust others again. Ultimately, Miharu overcomes his apathy, embracing newfound confidence. Satisfied, Asahi fades away, and the Shinra Bansho restores the lost memories of the past decade, though it notes lingering "lies" within Miharu's heart. Elsewhere, Ichiki regains her memories of the incident ten years prior, leading her to kill Hattori under unexplained circumstances. For the first time, she opens her eyes, revealing she was never blind, and departs with an undisclosed agenda. Meanwhile, Fuuma declares his ambition to transcend human understanding and attain godlike wisdom. Betrayed, Tobari attacks him, joined by Raimei and Raiko, who renounce their allegiance to Fuuma. Shijima and Aizawa likewise sever their long-standing alliance with him. The confrontation ends with Tobari grievously wounded, though he manages to stab Fuuma, causing him to wither away. Aizawa and Shijima then take the Shinra Bansho, vowing to sleep eternally "with their mother". Before parting, Miharu is granted a final glimpse of Yoite.

The story concludes with a celebration of Tobari's recovery. Gathered in Hana's backyard, Miharu expresses his desire to speak openly of Aizawa, Shijima, and Yoite. Holding a new cat named Yoi, he gazes toward the sun, finally free to live without fear, his loved ones at peace.

== Media ==
=== Manga ===
Written and illustrated by Yuhki Kamatani, Nabari no Ou was serialized in Square Enix's shōnen manga magazine Monthly GFantasy from May 18, 2004, to August 18, 2010. Square Enix collected its chapters in fourteen tankōbon volumes from November 27, 2004, to January 27, 2011.

In North America, the manga was licensed for English release by Yen Press. The manga was serialized in Yen Press' Yen Plus anthology magazine, from its first issue, released on July 29, 2008. The fourteen volumes were published from May 12, 2009, to July 23, 2013.

=== Anime ===
An anime adaptation directed by Kunihisa Sugishima, and animated by J.C.Staff premiered in Japan on TV Tokyo on April 6, 2008. The series aired weekly, with each episode subsequently airing on various other TXN networks, including TV Aichi, TVQ Kyushu Broadcasting, TV Osaka, TV Setouchi, and TV Hokkaido. The series ran for a total of twenty-six episodes.

On August 19, 2008, Funimation, on the behalf of d-rights, sent cease and desist orders to the fansub groups who were subtitling the series, to prevent copyright infringement, although the company did not have licensing rights at the time.

On December 24, 2008, Funimation announced that they will be releasing the English dub of the anime in 2009. At Otakon 2009, the first episode was shown in English at a Funimation panel. The first DVD was released on September 22, 2009.

The series made its North American television debut when it started airing on the Funimation Channel on March 29, 2010.

== Reception ==
Nabari no Ou was a finalist in the 2005 Japan Media Arts Festival and was a recommended title.
