= Shonen Note =

Japanese manga series

- Shonen Note: Boy Soprano
- Cover of the first volume

少年ノート (Shōnen Nōto)
- Manga
- Written by: Yuhki Kamatani
- Published by: Kodansha
- English publisher: NA: Kodansha USA
- Magazine: Monthly Morning Two
- Original run: November 22, 2010 – May 22, 2014
- Volumes: 8

Shonen Note: Boy Soprano (Japanese: 少年ノート, Hepburn: Shōnen Nōto) is a Japanese manga series written and illustrated by Yuhki Kamatani. It was serialized in Kodansha's seinen manga magazine Monthly Morning Two from November 2010 to May 2014, with its chapters collected in eight tankōbon volumes. The story follows a boy soprano named Yutaka Aoi as he enters the world of competitive choir and approaches inevitable voice changes due to puberty.

== Plot ==
Yutaka Aoi is a talented boy soprano with an angelic voice and an unusual sensitivity to sounds. Upon starting junior high, he joins his school's choir and develops friendships with various other members as they participate in competitions. He also becomes involved with his community's local opera. However, he must face the transient nature of his gift as soon puberty will deepen his voice. As the school year goes by, he crosses paths with a famous Russian boy soprano who is already losing his high singing voice, and Yutaka's fellow choir members also face their own challenges.

== Characters ==
Yutaka Aoi
A first-year student with the rare gift of singing soprano. He occasionally becomes overwhelmed by noise.
Akitoshi Betsuyaku
Third-year student, captain of the school choir, and pianist. A serious boy who sometimes clashes with others.
Midori Machiya
Second-year student and vice captain of the school choir. Others consider her mysterious. She also participates in opera with Yutaka.
Tomoya Tomo
Yutaka's friend and fellow first-year on the choir. He is unusually tall and often mistaken to be older than he is.
Mariko Ise
Another first-year on the choir. She is shy and has a hard time speaking up.
Vladimir Ilyich Popov
A Russian boy soprano who is known around the world. He is struggling with his changing voice.
Natsumi Mito
A choir member who admires Machiya and is coming to terms with who they are.
Minoru Aoi
Yutaka's older sibling and a former soprano. Currently a free-spirited wanderer who plays flute.

== Publication ==
Written and illustrated by Yuhki Kamatani, Shonen Note was serialized in Kodansha's seinen manga magazine Monthly Morning Two from November 22, 2010, to May 22, 2014. Kodansha collected its chapters in eight tankōbon volumes. The Japanese version is subtitled "Days of Evanescence." The story was developed from Kamatani's oneshot Octave (オクターブ) which was published in Morning Two in 2010; this pilot chapter is included in the seventh bound volume.

Kodansha USA licensed the series for an English-language release beginning in 2022.

== Reception ==
Shonen Note was a Jury Selection for the 17th Japan Media Arts Festival in 2013; they described it as a work that "portrays the harmony of the passing days of life at school, in which boys and girls share both their joys and conflicts."
