= Our Dreams at Dusk =

Japanese manga series

- Cover of the first volume, featuring the main character Tasuku Kaname

しまなみ誰そ彼 (Shimanami Tasogare)
- Genre: Coming-of-age, drama, magical realism
- Manga
- Written by: Yuhki Kamatani
- Published by: Shogakukan
- English publisher: NA: Seven Seas Entertainment
- Imprint: Big Comics Special
- Magazine: Hibana; Manga One
- Original run: March 6, 2015 – May 16, 2018
- Volumes: 4

Our Dreams at Dusk (Japanese: しまなみ誰そ彼, Hepburn: Shimanami Tasogare) is a Japanese manga series written and illustrated by Yuhki Kamatani. The story follows Tasuku Kaname, a gay teenager who meets other LGBTQ+ people at a discussion lounge after being involuntarily outed. The manga was serialized in Shogakukan's Hibana magazine from 2015 to 2017 and on the Manga One app from 2017 to 2018. Shogakukan collected the untitled chapters into four bound volumes under the Big Comics Special imprint. Seven Seas Entertainment licensed the series for an English-language release in North America.

== Plot ==
Set in Onomichi, Hiroshima Prefecture, high school student Tasuku Kaname prepares to commit suicide after his classmates discover gay pornography on his phone. Before he is able to do so, he witnesses someone leaping from a window, only to discover they were unharmed in the building where they jumped from. Tasuku discovers that the building is an open "drop-in center", where he meets other people with various troubles and learns to accept his sexuality.

== Characters ==
Tasuku Kaname (要 介, Kaname Tasuku)
Protagonist of the story. A closeted student at Shimanami High School and a member of the table tennis club. He has a crush on Toma Tsubaki, a member of the school volleyball team.
Someone (誰かさん, Dareka-san)
A mysterious and secretive person who owns the drop-in center. They are later revealed to be asexual, and their gender identity is indeterminate (as shown in Volume 4, Chapter 21, and stated by Yuhki Kamatani).
Tachibana (橘)
Tasuku's friend from the table tennis club.
Haruko Daichi (大地 春子, Daichi Haruko)
A member of the drop-in center who works for a non-profit organization that restores vacant houses in Onomichi. She is in a lesbian relationship with Saki.
Saki (早輝)
A member of the drop-in center. She is in a lesbian relationship with Haruko.
Utsumi (内海)
A member of the drop-in center who belongs to the same organization as Haruko. He is later revealed to be a trans man.
Tchaiko (チャイコ)
An elderly member of the drop-in center. He presents Tchaikovsky musical pieces (such as Symphony No. 1, Winter Daydreams) to Tasuku.
Shuji Misora (美空 秋治, Misora Shūji)
A sixth-grader student, who prefers to dress as a girl whenever they are at the drop-in center. They are unsure about their gender identity. Lives with their mother, grandmother, and two older sisters.
Touma Tsubaki (椿冬馬)
The boy Tasuku is in love with. A very popular student at school, the ace of the volleyball club and together with the protagonist he is a member of the health association. A lover of ichthyology, throughout the story they will grow closer to each other.

== Publication ==
Written and illustrated by Yuhki Kamatani, Our Dreams at Dusk was first serialized in Shogakukan's seinen manga magazine Hibana, premiering in the inaugural April 2015 issue (released on March 6). When the magazine ceased publication on August 7, 2017, the series transferred to Shogakukan's MangaOne app; there, it ran until its conclusion on May 16, 2018. Shogakukan collected the 23 untitled chapters into four tankōbon (bound volumes) under the Big Comics Special imprint; the first volume was published on December 11, 2015, and the fourth volume was published on July 19, 2018.

Seven Seas Entertainment licensed the manga for an English-language release in North America; the first volume was published on May 7, 2019, and the fourth volume was published on December 17, 2019. Seven Seas' marketing manager Lianne Sentar said of the series: "It manages to represent so many different ways that people shape their identities and find their unique spaces, which is something anyone can relate to. It's no wonder this compelling drama has resonated with so many people."

The manga is also licensed by Ediciones Tomodomo in Spain, J-Pop Manga in Italy, Akata in France, Carlsen in Germany and Dango in Poland.

No.	Original release date	Original ISBN	English release date	English ISBN
1	December 11, 2015	978-4-09-187419-1	May 7, 2019	978-1-642750-60-7
Chapters 1–5
2	October 12, 2016	978-4-09-189276-8	July 23, 2019	978-1-642750-61-4
Chapters 6–10
3	November 15, 2017	978-4-09-189740-4	September 24, 2019	978-1-642750-62-1
Chapters 11–15
4	July 19, 2018	978-4-09-860040-3	December 17, 2019	978-1-642750-63-8
Chapters 16–23

== Reception ==
In her review of the manga, Erica Friedman, the founder of Yuricon, described the series' coming out narrative as "crucial for gay Japanese youth." Rachel Thorn, an associate professor in the Faculty of Manga at Kyoto Seika University, described the work as "a much more realistic portrayal of the reality for a lot of LGBT et cetera folks in Japan right now." Beatrice Viri of CBR praised the comic for exploring LGBTQ themes and called it a "beautiful, metaphorical art and a heartfelt story leaving a lasting impact."

On August 14, 2019, the series was nominated for Best Manga at the 2019 Harvey Awards.

The Japan Media Arts Festival selected Shimanami Tasogare for their 2020 online exhibit "Manga, diversity and inclusion", a selection of "[f]ive outstanding works that tackle diversity and inclusion issues."
