= Aron's Absurd Armada =

South Korean manhwa series

- Front cover of the English translation of Aron's Absurd Armada, Volume 1.
- Genre: Comedy
- Author: MiSun Kim
- Publisher: (South Korea) Daewon C.I.
- English publisher: (United States) Yen Plus
- Original run: 2008–2012
- Volumes: 5

Aron's Absurd Armada is a Korean manhwa series by MiSun Kim. Originally published as a yonkoma webcomic, it has been serialized by Daewon between 2008 and 2012 in five volumes. The series is licensed in North America by Yen Plus in full color, and a collection of three omnibus volumes. The series revolves around the adventures of a gang of pirates led by idiotic Lord Aron Cornwall.

== Plot ==
Lord Aron Cornwall, son of bookish Duke Victor Cornwall and warrior-like Duchess Cornwall, and nephew of the seemingly psychic King, has decided to become a pirate. However, he is a stupid fool who makes for a poor captain. His crew consists of his manservant Robin, who acts as Aron's bodyguard and whose main interest is making money, and general servants Anton and Gilbert. The crew rescue a woman called Ronnie, but because a jellyfish got caught in her long hair, Anton and Gilbert cut her hair to a more boyish length resulting in the crew thinking that she is a man. When she denies this, the crew come to the conclusion that Ronnie is gay. She also instantly falls in love with Robin at first sight. Later on, the crew are joined by two more members: Mercedes, a male transvestite who joins the crew as a hair stylist but is actually an assassin; Vincent, a cook whose food tastes so awful that it can be used as a weapon; the masked burglar Luna, who works under the name of Phantom Thief XX; and Wendy, a witch who specialises in making rare poisons.

Aron's crew go out searching for treasure, including the tiny but valuable "Crown of the Queen of Ants". Along the way the marines try to scupper their plans. The marines responsible are Lieutenant Luther Nelson, who has had an antagonistic relationship with Aron since childhood and is the illegitimate son of Duchess Cornwall's rival Admiral Nelson, and Ensign Dorothy Nelson, Luther's cousin with whom he is deeply in love.

== Reception ==
Melinda Beasi, writing for Manga Bookshelf gave Aron's Absurd Armada a positive review. Beasi wrote, when reviewing the opening sections of the comic: "This is a supremely silly comic, but I don't actually mean that as a criticism. It's light and whimsical, and though I had to read it through a couple of times to really get the premise, I found it genuinely enjoyable."

When reviewing the first printed collection Beasi gave a more mixed review saying: "True to its name, Aron's Absurd Armada is devoted to humor rather than plot, and in this it largely succeeds. Though translating foreign comedy tends to err on the "miss" side of "hit-or-miss," Kim's sense of humor easily bridges cultural barriers—most of the time, at least. Only two or three jokes rely too heavily on Korean pop culture references to translate effectively in this first volume, which is a fairly good track record when compared to much of the Japanese 4-koma that's been licensed for English-language release.

L.B. Bryant of ICV2 also liked the series, writing: "Aron's Absurd Armada is a delightful and fun romp with a cast of characters that will constantly have you giggling. It's really got everything that you want in a comedy series such as a strong mix of characters that all balance each other out and artwork that is pleasing to look at as you turn each page. Even better, there is an actual story that plays out swiftly from page to page. There is very little that you can say about this comic that isn't a compliment."

However, Bryant also said that it was best read in small segments saying, "Aron's Absurd Armada is basically the manhwa equivalent of candy. It's absolutely delicious and delightful when you take it in as a treat but once you start trying to consume too much of it in one sitting it just doesn't sit right in your stomach."

The series has however been criticised by some due to the use of gay jokes which could possibly be seen as homophobic. Beasi wrote that, "the biggest cultural disconnect is the unfortunate volume of gay jokes that crop up, a large number of which originate in the series' deliberate BL overtones. As a general rule, however, the series is genuinely funny, light, and satisfyingly whimsical."

Bryant said on the subject of the comic's gay humor: "The 'Older Teen' rating is appropriate for this book thanks to the language and more adult humor that plays out throughout each page however particularly as the series likes to play around with gender roles (for example, Ronnie, one of the lone females of the series, is seen and treated as a gay male due to her short hair) and will sometimes take jabs that can be taken in worse lights in the wrong hands (constant 'homo' jokes are made against Ronnie due to her open crush on Robin). Provided that you have a sense of maturity however, these jokes are harmless and all in good fun."
