= Yuhki Kamatani =

Japanese manga artist

Yuhki Kamatani 鎌谷 悠希
- Born: June 22, 1983 (age 43) Fukuyama, Hiroshima, Japan
- Area: Manga artist
- Notable works: Nabari no Ou; Our Dreams at Dusk

Yuhki Kamatani (鎌谷 悠希, Kamatani Yūki; born June 22, 1983) is a Japanese manga artist and illustrator, best known for their series Nabari no Ou (隠の王, Nabari no Ō; lit. Ruler of Nabari), published by Square Enix.

== Personal life ==
In 2012, Kamatani came out on Twitter as asexual and X-gender. They are also aromantic. In their Twitter profile, Kamatani notes their gender as "toX"—following the tradition of transgender individuals identifying as FTM or MTF—which conceals the gender they were assigned at birth.

In a 2018 interview, Kamatani described the pain they faced in their teenage years due to their own identity struggles. These experiences are somewhat reflected in their work Our Dreams at Dusk, which according to Rachel Thorn marks "probably the first time that I can think of where an actual trans person is talking about [trans experiences] or portraying [them]" outside of the essay manga format.

== Works ==
Kamatani's manga frequently features characters in transitional life stages and issues regarding identity and marginalization. They cite Moto Hagio as a major inspiration; like Hagio, their manga often explores gender and visual metaphor.

=== Nabari no Ou ===
Kamatani's debut work, Nabari no Ou (隠の王), was a "modern ninja manga" about a seemingly ordinary teenage boy whose body contains an omnipotent ninja power that hidden ninja clans battle to claim. It was a finalist under the Story Manga division in the ninth Japan Media Arts Festival in 2005 and was ultimately recommended by the committee. The first volume of an English translation of the manga was released in May 2009 by Yen Press. The 14th and final volume was published in Japan in 2011 and in the United States in 2013. Kamatani worked with J.C.Staff to create a 26-episode anime adaptation of Nabari no Ou. Directed by Kunihisa Sugishima, the series aired in Japan on TV Tokyo in 2008.

=== Shonen Note ===
Shonen Note: Days of Evanescence (少年ノート) was published by Kodansha, serialized in their seinen Monthly Morning Two magazine. The story follows a boy soprano with an angelic voice and his life as a member of his middle school choir. Kodansha published eight volumes in Japan from 2011 to 2014. In 2013, the manga was a Jury Selection for the 17th Japan Media Arts Festival.

Kodansha USA licensed the series for North America release under the title Shonen Note: Boy Soprano; volume one will be published during Fall 2022.

=== Busshi no Busshin ===
Busshi no Busshin: Kamakura Hanbun Busshiroku (ぶっしのぶっしん 鎌倉半分仏師録) is a historical fantasy manga published by Square Enix and serialized in its digital magazine Gangan Online. The first volume was published in Japan in 2014.

=== Our Dreams at Dusk ===
In Our Dreams at Dusk (しまなみ誰そ彼, Shimanami Tasogare), set in Onomichi, Hiroshima, Kamatani depicts queer characters coming to terms with their identity. Shogakukan published four tankōbon volumes from December 11, 2015, to July 19, 2018. The main character is a gay man named Tasuku Kaname, who has a crush on Toma Tsubaki, a member of the school volleyball team. The book also features lesbian, asexual, transmasculine, genderqueer, and cross-dressing characters.

Seven Seas Entertainment licensed the manga for North American release beginning on May 7, 2019, stating "It manages to represent so many different ways that people shape their identities and find their unique spaces, which is something anyone can relate to. It's no wonder this compelling drama has resonated with so many people."

=== Hiraeth: The End of the Journey ===
Kamatani returned to Kodansha's Monthly Morning Two with Hiraeth: The End of the Journey (ヒラエスは旅路の果て, Hiraesu wa Tabiji no Hate), starting October 22, 2020. The story follows a god, an immortal man, and a girl who wants to die so she can reunite with a friend.

Kodansha USA licensed the series for a digital North American release.

=== Other works ===
Liberamente (リベラメンテ, Riberamente), a collection of fantasy manga short stories, was published in 2005 by Square Enix.

Manga short stories by Kamatani have appeared in several official Touken Ranbu anthologies published by Shogakukan and Square Enix.

In 2017, Kamatani collaborated with screenwriter Yasuko Kobayashi on a three-chapter contemporary "period drama" manga titled Unlock (アンロック).

In 2024, Hayacomic started publishing Kamatani's manga adaptation of Tōma Aisaka's Dōshi Shōjo yo, Teki o Ute (Shoot the Enemy, Comrade Women) novel, telling the story of a female Red Army sniper during World War Two.
