= Beyblade: Metal Masters =

- Season 2
- The cover of the first DVD compilation released by Sony Pictures Entertainment
- No. of episodes: 51

Release
- Original network: TV Tokyo
- Original release: April 4, 2010 – March 27, 2011

Season chronology
- ← Previous; Metal Fusion Next → Metal Fury

Beyblade: Metal Masters, known in Japan as Metal Fight Beyblade Baku (メタルファイト ベイブレード 爆, Metaru Faito Beiburēdo Baku), is the second season of the Japanese anime television series Beyblade: Metal Saga based on Takafumi Adachi's manga series Beyblade: Metal Fusion, which itself is based on the Beyblade spinning top game from Takara Tomy and Hasbro. The 51-episode season was produced by d-rights and Nelvana under the direction of Kunihisa Sugishima. The season was first broadcast on TV Tokyo in Japan between April 4, 2010, and March 27, 2011. The English season with English opening premiered in Australia on Cartoon Network on July 25, 2011 and later on Network Ten on November 8, 2011, at 7:30 am, and in the United States on Cartoon Network on August 20, 2011, at 10:30 am. On Canada on YTV September 10, 2011, at 11:30 am.

Two pieces of theme music were used for the opening and closing themes. The opening theme is "Galaxy Heart" (ギャラクシーハート, "Gyarakushī Hāto") performed by YU+KI, and the ending theme is "It Goes Over the Sky" (大空を越えてゆけ, "Ōzora o Koete Yuke"), performed by Odoriba Soul. Beyblade: Metal Masters was followed by a third season, Beyblade: Metal Fury.

== Episode list ==
No. overall	No. in season	Title	Original release date	English air date
52	1	"Seeking the Legend"; Transliteration: "Densetsu o motomete" (Japanese: 伝説を求めて)	April 4, 2010	July 25, 2011 (AUS); August 20, 2011 (US)
An unknown blader arrives by plane, seemingly in search of somebody to challenge. He walks into the arena during the final battle and interrupts Yu and Tsubasa's battle. The anonymous Blader's bey Ray Striker stops Earth Eagle and Flame Libra from striking each other. Fortunately, all Beyblades are still spinning inside the stadium. Tsubasa calls back his Earth Eagle, uninterested by this new challenger, however Yu takes up his request for a beybattle. He soon finds out that Ray Striker can skirt around his opponent at a moment's notice; seemingly able to teleport before it can be attacked. Flame Libra gets buried into the stadium floor after Ray Striker delivers a powerful blow. Yu does not give up yet, but the new blader, Masamune Kadoya, figures that he has simply won and, ignoring Yu, he calls for Gingka in the arena. Blader DJ tells him that Gingka is not present right now, that he is away in the mountains. Determined to find his real opponent, Masamune goes to find him. Ryo, now the director and manager of the WBBA, chuckles at Masamune's behavior, while Hikaru, his secretary, is mostly surprised. He stops laughing when Masamune starts calling after Gingka though. Ryo asks Hikaru if she plans on going back to Beyblading, however she is too traumatised by her shattering defeat against Ryuga. On his part, Ryo wonders out loud if it is not time for Phoenix to return, as he poses as a super hero. Meanwhile, Madoka and Kenta meet with Gingka at a restaurant to tell him to hurry so they can take a bus to Koma Village. There, Hokuto and Hyoma join them to go on a search for the legendary Beyblade: Galaxy Pegasus. They have to go through scorching hot sceneries and cold wintery mountains to find it. They finally reach a tepid waterfall, but the opening of the cave that is supposed to be where Galaxy Pegasus is most likely hidden. Since Gingka has no Beyblade now, Hyoma and Kenta take out theirs and the opening is revealed. On the walls of the cavern are prehistoric drawings of men, horses, and Beyblades. All of a sudden, they reach the end of the cave where a huge block of rock stands, a Beyblade imprisoned in its centre. Kenta and Hyoma try to use their Beyblades again to dislodge the new Legend-based Bey, but the rock does not even sport scratches from their attack. While everybody is shocked, Gingka walks towards the block to stand in front of it. Suddenly, rays of light come out of the Beyblade's Face Bolt. Intrigued, Gingka reaches towards it with his hand, and the Beyblade as well as his whole body light up in a blue aura. He takes hold of the bey, and cracks begin to appear in the rocky cocoon, making the bey shine brightly. Gingka gets seemingly transported in an illusion where he is in a galaxy. A rain of stars start showering around him and Pegasus finally advances towards him. Gingka is so happy to see it that tears appear in his eyes. The two meet and touch, signaling the reunion of two allies. Galaxy Pegasus can now be removed from the block of rock, and an overwhelming light shoots from Galaxy Pegasus into the universe, in the direction of the Pegasus Constellation. Gingka is very eager to test his new Beyblade, so they all exit the cave and he gets to a place where he can target a pillar of rock. As soon as he launches it, he gets pulled backwards by the force of his Beyblade, and the rock gets completely destroyed. Even though he is shocked by this power, Gingka is ecstatic to know that he owns a Beyblade again. Out of nowhere, Masamune appears and challenges him. They start fighting and Gingka wins easily, but Galaxy Pegasus gets out of control!
53	2	"The Persistent Challenger"; Transliteration: "Fukutsu no charenjaa" (Japanese: 不屈の一角獣 (チャレンジャー))	April 11, 2010	July 26, 2011 (AUS); August 20, 2011 (USA)
Masamune jumps incredibly high from the rock he had been standing onto and lands behind Gingka, Madoka, Kenta, Hyoma, and Hokuto. Doubting his credibility, the group of friends crouch to make a cocus about him. Masamune gets irritated and runs towards Gingka. Both of them begin to talk back to each other heatedly, and both end up wanting to battle the other. They go to a man-made hole in the ground that will serve as a stadium. Both launch and Gingka's Galaxy Pegasus quickly starts showing its untamed strength. At one point, it decides to go straight into the walls of the Beystadium, making big explosions of dirt. One of the rocks it destroys though lands back on its Face, making it immobile while still spinning. Masamune sees this opportunity to strike, however Galaxy Pegasus starts emitting blue light and seems to explode in a huge fireball. The rock on top of it disintegrates in the explosion and Galaxy Pegasus has enough time to nonchalantly hit Ray Striker backwards at full force, knocking it way out of the stadium. Masamune runs after it. After searching a lot, he finds it in a river, stuck to a surfacing rock, so he plunges into the water to get it. He is happy to have got his Beyblade back and he is still ready to fight Gingka again, but he soon notices that standing in the water has made his back cold. At the other location, Gingka grabs his new Beyblade in his hand, and he observes it silently while the others cheer for him. After a moment, he faces them and expresses his irritation at not being able to control Galaxy Pegasus at all. He won, however he felt no passion in his play, and therefore he is very upset by his performance and he knows he has to practice more with Pegasus all over again. At the train station, Hokuto and Hyoma stay behind, but they encourage Gingka by giving him wise words, also inviting him to come back whenever he wants. Unknown to them, Masamune is also in the train with them, eating some weird spicy orange sticks. At the basement of the B-Pit, Madoka analyses Galaxy Pegasus with her machine and they discover that it is a strong combination of Attack-type parts. In the middle of their discussion, a voice calls for them from upstairs, searching for Gingka. As they reach the first floor, they see Masamune standing at the door of the hobby shop. Masamune challenges him and Gingka accepts his challenge, and a huge explosion beats Masamune's Ray Striker. Still unhappy about his control of Galaxy Pegasus, Gingka gets some help from Kenta with another beybattle. Masamune keeps coming back after running after his Bey several times, but unexpected explosions happen every time. Eventually, they battle on the riverside, and the fight is slightly longer than usual. Gingka believes for an instant that he has mastered Galaxy Pegasus, however the latter suddenly decides to send Ray Striker straight into the hill, where an explosion is triggered again and Ray Striker stops spinning. Gingka slowly and sadly walks to take his Beyblade and Masamune runs past him to get his. He promises Gingka that he will come back stronger, and he flees. Kenta decides to run after him. He eventually thinks that he has lost him when he reaches the old warehouses that the Face Hunters used to inhabit, but he hears noise at one door. Entering, he discovers that Masamune is practicing with Ray Striker by having it swiftly dodge big chunks of wood that swing left and right. Just as Ray Striker moves too slowly and gets knocked away by one of them, Kenta makes his presence known, scaring Masamune. Ray Striker hits the far wall and stops spinning. Masamune aggressively asks Kenta what he is doing there, and Kenta refuses to leave. After some arguing, they decide to establish peace and help each other. Masamune offers some of his orange stick food to Kenta, the latter who did not expect it to be so spicy in his mouth starts feeling the spice. While Masamune takes one in his mouth casually, Kenta struggles to speak to him now that his tongue and lips are burnt. Eventually, they both go to meet Gingka at a construction site, where a hole in the ground still represents a stadium for them. A pile of small rocks lies on one side of it. The battle begins excitedly, and Galaxy Pegasus already starts moving around in a circle. Masamune knows how to counter the attacks though: he either makes his blade quickly turn away from the hits, or Ray Striker simply teleports. It is even able to change directions completely in a mere second. Ray Striker succeeds in striking Galaxy Pegasus and forcing it back into the pile of rock, which falls on Gingka's beyblade, burying it. Masamune catches his Beyblade back, knowing he has finally won against his rival. Gingka grimly walks to take his Pegasus too and after concentrating a lot, he comes to find the real strength of Galaxy Pegasus and succeeds in forming a bond with it. Satisfied with this, Gingka wants to test his new performance and they all see how extremely powerful Gingka now is. Gingka asks Masamune if he wants to battle again now that he controls his Pegasus, but Masamune, not blind at all to the power he just witnessed, firmly refuses, figuring out that he has already won once against Gingka and that this is enough for him, that Gingka will never be able to beat him again. Both begin another argument, of course. Standing on a construction vehicle not far away, a new Chinese Blader calls out for them.
54	3	"A New Challenge"; Transliteration: "Aratanaru chousen" (Japanese: 新たなる挑戦)	April 18, 2010	July 27, 2011 (AUS); August 20, 2011 (USA)
Masamune and Gingka do several childish challenges to see who is better: for instance, who can stand on his hands the longest, who can hold his breath the longest, etc. Benkei, Kenta, and Madoka are completely flabbergasted about their attitudes. Gingka and Masamune continuously argue. Suddenly, they hear a 'gong' sound being done repeatedly. They turn around and see a Chinese girl at the door of the B-Pit. As she enters, she greets everybody, and Gingka introduces himself. The girl immediately looks up and starts asking Masamune and Benkei if they are Gingka, until the latter reminds her of his identity. She gravely tells them about an invitation the Chinese team has for them; they have to meet up in Chinatown. Once she has left, they meet Benkei and they all salivate at the thought that there is going to be a lot of delicious Chinese food there, so they hurry to Chinatown. After much trouble understanding the location in the invitation, they finally arrive to a temple. The doors are locked, so they impatiently wait. Without warning, the doors suddenly open. the hungry boys run inside, and only see the four inner walls and three doors. Two Beybladers, including Mei Mei, the Chinese girl who had invited them to Chinatown, come out of the main one, and Gingka and his friends are surprised to see such a small boy at Mei Mei's side who apparently holds some authority over her. They learn that they were invited to a battle against the both of them and while Gingka was particularly targeted, he has to fight with Masamune on his side, which of course begins a new argument between them. Benkei also complains because he really wanted Chinese food, and Chi-yun Li, the short Blader, grants his wishes by presenting two chefs just waiting for him. Benkei hurriedly runs to them while the match begins. The two new Bladers are used to Blading as a tag team, unlike Masamune and Gingka, therefore they easily avoid Galaxy Pegasus and Ray Striker's hits. Instead, they make the two Beys clash at each other, which creates even more frustration between Masamune and Gingka. Chi-yun invokes powerful attacks that push the beyblades away with his free-rotation Spin Track. Eventually, after many arguments and failures, Gingka and Masamune succeed in trapping Thermal Lacerta, Chi-yun's Beyblade. unfortunately, as the result of the hit--after the flash has disappeared--is that all three Beys are still spinning, but Mei Mei's Aquario 105F has somehow been ejected from the stadium. This ends the match since the Chinese team basically lost, and Gingka and Masamune get into another fight, criticising each other's performance on the battle. The two Chinese tell them that they will see each other again. Meanwhile, Ryo and Hikaru realize how many people around the world are beyblading, and Ryo gets an interesting idea: the WBBA will organise a tournament reuniting Beybladers from every region of the world.
55	4	"Ticket to the World"; Transliteration: "Sekai he no kippu" (Japanese: 世界への切符)	April 25, 2010	July 28, 2011 (AUS); August 27, 2011 (USA)
The World Beyblade Championships, the most major competition hosted by the WBBA is beginning. The Japanese qualifier for the tournament starts and the majority of the rounds are over very quickly with Masamune, Tsubasa, Yu, and Kyoya all making it to the semi-finals. Yu desperately tries to face Masamune but Kenta battles him instead and loses. Yu then proceeds to face Masamune but time is up before they can even start. Because Gingka won Battle Bladers he is automatically selected as Japan's first representative. Gingka doesn't know this until Kenta tells him. He goes to his father and pleads with him to let him battle. Gingka then launches Galaxy Pegasus and it goes around a chair leg and Gingka says that battling alone isn't fun. In the first semi-final match, Yu faces off with Masamune. Their Beys clash in battle as Yu gains the upper hand with his Flame Libra against Masamune's Ray Striker. Despite this, Masamune fights back and eventually defeats Yu, making Masamune one of Japan's representatives to the World Beyblade Championships. Despite the loss, Yu still has a chance to become a sub for the team. At the end of the battle, Masamune states he won the battle because he is the number 1 Blader in the world.
56	5	"Final Battle! Leone VS Eagle"; Transliteration: "Kessen! Reoone VS Akuira" (Japanese: 決戦!レオーネVSアクイラ)	May 2, 2010	July 29, 2011 (AUS); September 3, 2011 (USA)
Yu has lost to Masamune and the next battle will begin, which is Kyoya Vs Tsubasa. Before the event, they have gone through serious training to beat each other. The time finally comes for the match. Kyoya and Tsubasa ready their beys and then the battle begins! Kyoya is determined to win and attacks Tsubasa's bey. Just as Tsubasa seems about to lose, the dark power from his previous battle with Ryuga overwhelms him. A while later, Tsubasa's dark side takes total control and then Eagle tries to push Leone into the stadium floor! But then Kyoya stopped Tsubasa and won. Tsubasa's pet eagle was what let Tsubasa control his dark side again. the harsh cry of the eagle brought him back to the reality of the battle. Gingka went over to congratulate Kyoya, but he said that beating Gingka was his one and only goal and then leaves, leaving Tsubasa a spot in the Beyblade World Championships team.
57	6	"Soar Into the World"; Transliteration: "Shouke, sekai he!" (Japanese: 翔け、世界へ!)	May 9, 2010	August 1, 2011 (AUS); September 10, 2011 (USA)
After Kyoya refused the offer to join the Japanese team, Gingka is left wondering why. Meanwhile Hikaru and Ryo consider who will replace Kyoya, Ryo considers Tsubasa and Yu. Yu, Kenta and Masamune are eating in a cafe in a shopping centre. Yu complains loudly to anyone who will listen about how even if he wins against Tsubasa, he will only be the sub member of the team. Madoka then rushes up to them and announces if Yu wins his match he will become the last regular member. Yu is overjoyed by the news and warns Masamune not to interfere in this match with Tsubasa, Masamune becoming very confused at this. Elsewhere, Tsubasa is sitting by a fire, thinking over his match with Kyoya. His eagle friend cries out, making ripples appear over the surface of the water in the mug he is holding. Tsubasa ponders over this. The next day, Tsubasa and Yu face each other in battle, Yu complaining he'd had enough of Masamune talking like he was above him. Tsubasa uses tactics to stop Yu from firing Libra's special move, and pulls it off. As Tsubasa already knows how to break through this special move, victory looks to be his. At the last moment, Yu changes the frequency of the move, making it shine different colours, and stops Tsubasa's attack. Instead of fighting back, Tsubasa gives up resistance, allowing him to counter the special move and win the match. Gingka though is still disappointed by Kyoya, until that night Kenta and Benkei confront him about it, resulting in a battle that Madoka spectates. At the airport, the team are all excited for the tournament except Yu, who is still complaining about only being the sub. Benkei tries to encourage Yu to look on the bright side of this, just as Madoka turns up to be their support member as she now works for the WBBA. Ryo announces the team's name is Gan Gan Galaxy and will be flying out to China. Gingka comments the name suits them perfectly, whilst Masamune complains it only suits Gingka perfectly. The five board the plane, whilst all their friends wave them off with their beys.
58	7	"The Beylin Temple in the Sky"; Transliteration: "Tenkuu no Beirinji" (Japanese: 天空のベイ林寺)	May 16, 2010	August 2, 2011 (AUS); September 17, 2011 (USA)
Gan Gan Galaxy arrives in China and wonders what they should do until their battle. They hear a bey battle and go watch. To the team's surprise, it is Mei Mei winning back the beys that a bunch of thugs stole from some kids. Gingka asks her can she take them to where Wang Hu Zhong, the Chinese team trains and she readily agrees. She tells them not to get discouraged by what they see. When they all arrive at Beylin Temple they see the rigorous training the bladers are doing. Chi-yun tells them that Beylin Temple has been around for 4000 years. Mei Mei takes them to meet Wang Hu Zhong's leader Dashan Wang. Gingka and Masamune try some of training that Da Shan and the bladers did and do well on their first try. Dashan also battles Gingka to match but Masamune interfere when Gingka was going to use his special move. When Gan Gan Galaxy left Beylin Temple Masamune figured outed that Dashan tried to see Galaxy Pegasus special move but now they know Rock Zurafa's power.
59	8	"The Third Man"; Transliteration: "Daisan no otoko" (Japanese: 第三の男)	May 23, 2010	August 3, 2011 (AUS); September 24, 2011 (USA)
Madoka receives an e-mail from the WBBA that is about the tournament and the team tries to decide in what order they go but has problems in doing so. So Madoka goes to Beylin Temple to try to find out the third member of Wang Hu Zhong but gets caught by Mei Mei and finds out that Gingka is there as well. He asks Chi-yun about the third blader accept he doesn't go to Beylin Temple. Masamune Battles at a bey park and is winning until his Striker knockouted the stadium by Chao Xin's Virgo and demands a battles, but denieds it and also finds out that is Wang Hu Zhong's third blader. Masamune still demands a battle but Chao Xin still won't accept until Dashan appears makes him battle. Gingka and Madoka learns about Chao Xin from Mei Mei and Chi-yun. Tsubasa and Yu watch Masamune and Chao Xin battle on the Great Wall of China. Chao Xin's Virgo gets the upper the hand until Masamune uses his lightning sword flash but it a piece a wall to causing him to fall and Ray Striker losing its balance so he loses. Back at the hotel Madoka receives another e-mail from the WBBA that is the line of order Wang Hu Zhong is Battling.
60	9	"The World Championships Begin!"; Transliteration: "Kaimaku! Sekai Taikai" (Japanese: 開幕!世界大会)	May 30, 2010	August 4, 2011 (AUS); October 1, 2011 (USA)
Masamune struggles to overcome his loss of Chao Xin during their last battle. In order to overcome this, he attempts to undergo training, while the rest of his team, wonder what he is doing. As Masamune undergoes training, he launches Ray Striker into a pillar of rock. He is successfully able to break it into pieces but hears someone screaming. He runs to see and then finds an elderly man who appears to be hurt. Masamune asks what is wrong with him, as the man replies his stomach is grumbling for food. Masamune lets the man eat some food but eventually eats all of his food and his water. He later finds out his Ray Striker did not hurt the man, much to Masamune's dismay. Meanwhile, Chao Xin is busy signing autographs for his many fangirls. His fangirls are very confident that Chao Xin will win in the first battle of the World Beyblade Championships. Chao Xin has a flashback of his earlier battle and remembers how hard it was to defeat Masamune, but he remains confident. Later, the man brings Manasmune to a bamboo forest. He tells him to crush a small leaf with his fists, which Masamune does. However, he does not crush through it, just pushes it away into the air, The man tells him he has to focus his strength into one point in order to crush through the leaf. Masamune understands this and focus his power into one point to crush the leaf. The World Beyblade Championships have begun as Team Gan Gan Galaxy and Team Wang Hu Zhong take center stage. The first battle will be between Masamune and Chao Xin. Masamune appears very confident despite losing to Chao Xin before. The two ready their Beyblades as they Let it Rip and battle. Masamune's Ray Striker faces off between Chao Xin's Virgo. The Beys clash in an epic battle as they continue to hit each other. Soon enough however, Masamune learns that Chao Xin has customized his Virgo, into a Poison Virgo, making it even harder for Masamune to win the battle. Despite this, Masamune fights back and eventually breaks off one blade off Poison Virgo. Chao Xin is shocked at this, and struggles to fight back, as his fangirls are very confused at how Chao Xin could let this occur. Chao Xin takes off his jacket and starts to finally focus and concentrate in his battle. Despite Chao's best efforts, Poison Virgo is now unbalanced due to Ray Striker breaking one of the blades on the Poison Wheel and eventually loses, as Masamune has finally defeated Chao Xin in their rematch. Despite the loss, Chao Xin's fangirls cheer on him as Chao Xin does not care if he lost, making Masamune angry since more people were cheering for Chao Xin, who lost, instead of him, but on the other hand, Team Gan Gan Galaxy cheer and hug Masamune on his win. Masamune then gives his thanks to the elderly man for teaching him how to defeat Chao Xin.
61	10	"Lacerta's Will"; Transliteration: "Racheruta no iji" (Japanese: ラチェルタの意地)	June 6, 2010	August 5, 2011 (AUS); October 8, 2011 (USA)
While waiting for the second match Chi-yun practice and promises Da Shayan that he will win the match. Tsubasa worries about remaining calm and not losing control in the battle. When the second begins Chi-yun asks Tsubasa what happened to Kyoya and tells him that if he doesn't fight as strong as he did in that battle he won't win. They launch their beys and Chi-yun uses Iron Defense on Thermal Lacerta. When Tsubasa attacks prove to be avail, he tries his special move, but it gets countered. Chi-yun Thermal Lacerta begins to go all out on Earth Eagle, use his special moves. When Earth Eagle begins to stop spinning, Tsubasa tries another move taunted by again by Chi-yun but it still doesn't work. Chi-yun taunts start to make Tsubasa crazy. His dark side kicks in and Earth Eagle begins to smash Thermal Lactera into the stadium until it blasts itself out with Lactera barely spinning, making Chi-yun the winner. Tsubasa collapses after the match and the rest of the team go check on him.
62	11	"The 4000 Year Old Secret"; Transliteration: "Yonsennen no ougi" (Japanese: 四千年の奥義)	June 13, 2010	August 8, 2011 (AUS); October 15, 2011 (USA)
As the finals of the World Beyblade Championships that will decide which Team: Gan Gan Galaxy or Wang Hu Zhong, will head to the second round of the Championships. Gan Gan Galaxy rests before the battle while Tsubasa is nervous for what happened in the previous battle. His teammates however, assure him that everything is ok and are sure Gingka will get them to the second round. For Wang Hu Zhong however, Chi-yun trains himself even harder despite winning in the previous match. Dashan's teammates are confident enough to know that Dashan will lead them to the second round. As Gan Gan Galaxy walk to their match, they are confronted by Wang Hu Zhong and the Beyline Temple Bladers. They tell Gan Gan Galaxy that Dashan will for sure, win the battle as the tradition of the 4,000 Year-Old Beylin Temple goes. Although this tempts Gingka, he is confident that he will win. The match begins as Gingka and Dashaun ready their Beyblades and Let it Rip. Gingka tries to be careful this time, as he does not want to lose to Dashan like in their last battle. Gingka makes sure that Pegasus doesn't hit Zurafa too hard as Zurafa's R145 Spin Track will only absorb those hits. Instead, Gingka uses small hits so the rubber will not absorb them. Dashan however, knows this will not do much and attacks Pegasus, launching with a Special Move. It hits Pegasus so hard, it seems that Pegasus will have no chance to win and will take another loss. Gingka tries to make sure not to let this happen and strikes back, but to no avail. In the heat of the battle, Gingka decides that he will have no chance to defeat Dashan and his confidence is broken. However, Gingka's friends; Kenta, Benkei, and Kyoya, encourage Gingka to not give up and this reawakens Gingka as he fights back. In one final epic clash, Pegasus and Zurafa hit each other with so much power an explosion appears. After the mist from it is cleared, it is shown that Zurafa has stopped spinning, giving Pegasus the win and thus, entry to the second round of the World Beyblade Championships. Dashan, disappointed for losing the match knows he broke the 4,000 Year-Old Tradition of the Beylin Temple. His teammates however, tell him that even though he lost, he did not break the tradition and that the tradition is still going. Gingka's teammates praise Gingka for winning the match and are glad that they are moving on to the second round. Now, they will head to Russia, for the second match of the World Beyblade Championships.
63	12	"The Bey with a Hero's Name"; Transliteration: "Yuusha no mei o motsu Bei" (Japanese: 勇者の名を持つベイ)	June 20, 2010	August 9, 2011 (AUS); October 22, 2011 (USA)
After the match where GanGan Galaxy defeated Wang Hu Zhong and moved to the second round, Benkei is just about to board a plane. After he says his goodbyes to all the friends he made, he boards the plane and heads for an unknown destination. Elsewhere, a young man is seen riding a horse on a rich estate. He then rides the horse into a first-class helicopter and enters it. He then receives his Launcher and Beyblade. As Gan Gan Galaxy are on their plane heading to Arabia, to find out about Team Desert Blaze, Gingka remembers how before they boarded their flight, Dashan told Gingka that he must win the World Beyblade Championships, for the honour of the Beylin Temple. Gingka assures this as Dashan tells him how the rest of Wang Hu Zhong are training in order to become more powerful. As the team arrives, they find out about Team Desert Blaze, the Arabic Representative Team. They meet up with Desert Blaze and are amazed at how much power the Team holds. Being able to summon the Beasts and combine them in order to win a battle. Desert Blaze find Gan Gan Galaxy and have a chat with them. The two Teams discuss their place in the Beyblade World Championships and are very enthusiastic to face one another in an upcoming match. Desert Blaze, which consists of Gasur, and two other Bladers are also eager to face them. The two teams make friends as Gan Gan Galaxy waits to see Desert Blaze's match against the EU Representative, Team Excalibur. As Gan Gan Galaxy walks along a sidewalk, they find the young man earlier on from the episode, getting out of a limo, appearing to look very wealthy as he enters a building. Gan Gan Galaxy are confused by this but decide to ignore it, knowing it will not have any importance. Finally, the match between Desert Blaze and Excalibur is about to begin. Gasur and the others take stage as Excalibur does also. However, there is only one Blader from Excalibur, the young man, Julian Konzern. This shocks Gan Gan Galaxy, not expecting to see him here and surprised at how only one representative from the EU Team showed up. Julian appears to be very confident, despite being in a 3 vs. 1 match. Desert Blaze are confident they will win as Julian and Gasur ready their Beyblades for the first round and Let it Rip. The battle goes off to a great start as Gasur seems very confident in his battle. However, when he attacks Julian's Bey, it does not seem to have any effect. Madoka analyzes this and finds out something shocking, Julian's Bey, "Gravity Destroyer", has a very thick Fusion Wheel and a unique Energy Ring that serves as a "helmet" to the Fusion Wheel, which is why the attacks of Gasur do not affect Destroyer. Julian then hears a mystic melody and cannot take it anymore, he soon tells the story of the hero, "Destroyer". A hero that slayed the evil Medusa by cutting off her head and using it against anyone. Anyone who stared at Medusa's eyes turned to stone. Soon enough however, Destroyer switches from Defense Mode, to "Counter Mode" which feature red dots on the Fusion Wheel, meant to represent the "eyes" of Medusa. As Destroyer closes in, Gasur's Bey is stopped and then hit out of the Stadium by Destroyer as it shocks the audience. Gasur's teammates take the stage for round two as they take on Julian on 2 vs. 1, already knowing his tricks. Despite this, Destroyer suddenly spins to the left, shocking everyone, especially Gingka. As Julian Konzern defeats Desert Blaze. Desert Blaze cannot believe they were defeated as Gingka is in total shock at this Destroyer, knowing it will be a very powerful Beyblade that he will face in the World Beyblade Championships.
64	13	"The Wintry Land of Russia"; Transliteration: "Goukan no chi Roshia" (Japanese: 極寒の地ロシア)	June 27, 2010	August 10, 2011 (AUS); October 29, 2011 (USA)
Team Gan Gan Galaxy go on a train to the cold land of Russia where they will face the Russian team Lovushka. They first meet them on the train and they decide to have a battle with each other. Madoka seems to have a crush on a scientist named Aleksei who unbenounced is the team leader of Lovushka shows the same interest with bey statistics. Gingka and Masamune end up beating Nowaguma and Lera and Aleksei is defeated on purpose by Yu to conduct a bey analysis on the Team Gan Gan Galaxy's beys. While this all happening Aleksei is secretly downloading data of the teams beys from Madoka's computer. After this Masmune goes to the other train car and decides to go back to sleep, but when he wakes up he ends up on a tropical resort and the rest of the team ends up at the arena.
65	14	"How Grand! The Cage Match"; Transliteration: "Souzetsu! Kanaami Desumacchi!" (Japanese: 壮絶!金網デスマッチ!)	July 4, 2010	August 11, 2011 (AUS); November 5, 2011 (USA)
Anton looks at the stolen data from Madoka's computer. Gan Gan Galaxy haven't received a message from the WBBA about Masamune as he walked the mountains. Aleksei shows Gan Gan Galaxy the space shuttle that his team will go on if they win the tournament. The next round of the tournament is beginning and Masamune still hasn't come back yet Gingka will battle in the first round and Anton has found out by spying on them so he chose Nowaguma. Masamune gets help from sky pilot. The battle between Gingka and Nowaguma will be a steel cage match. Gingka try to use his Star Booster Attack but can't because of the cage, so he tries again but Anton activates an electric field that stops Pegasus. Rock Orso stops Galaxy Pegasus attacks and knocks it into the cage. Pegasus absorbs Orso power to break through the cage and use Star Booster Attack again sending Rock Orso into the cage defeating Nowaguma. The sky pilot drops Masamune at the train station near Russia.
66	15	"Libra Departs for the Front!"; Transliteration: "Ribura shutsujin!" (Japanese: リブラ出陣!)	July 11, 2010	August 12, 2011 (AUS); November 12, 2011 (USA)
Masamune is still missing, so they have to make do with another member. The gang all suggests Tsubasa goes except for Yu, who wants to battle. Tsubasa said that was fine, and soon Yu was facing Aleksei. In the meantime, Masamune arrives and is looking for the team. He then runs into Anton, who is controlling the electromagnetic wave currents. He then faces Anton and stops him. Yu then defeats Aleksei as well, before Masamune stopped the wave currents. In the end, the Russian Team gets their wish after all to go into space.
67	16	"The Festival of Warriors"; Transliteration: "Senshi no saiten" (Japanese: 戦士の祭典)	July 18, 2010	August 15, 2011 (AUS); November 19, 2011 (USA)
Gingka along with his friends arrives in Greece to try to get into the Festival of Warriors, however, Madoka just wants to see the scenery so, as there is still time for the Festival to begin, they decide to visit the beach. There, Masamune notices a girl standing on the edge of a high cliff and they try to save her, Madoka hears them running and shouting and follows them. The girl then explains that she wants to become an archaeologist and is looking for ruins of a sunken Greek ship. She uses her Beyblade to successfully locate the ship by using it to move the water. Later when they are eating at a restaurant, they discuss who that girl might be, and Yu comments that she could be one of the EU representatives. Suddenly, they hear a commotion, and a Blader challenges another Blader called Wales, who is from England, to a Beybattle. Wales accepts, and tells him that he shall give him three seconds of his time. The Beybattle lasts for only three seconds and Wales breaks the opponents Beyblade with one hit. Gingka and co. are amazed at how he was able to do that and question the possibility of him being an EU representative. Later, when they try to get into the Festival of Warriors, they are denied access because they are not EU Members. Wales comes out, and the girl from earlier comes out afterwards and reveals her name to be Sophie. Later, Gingka and co. decide to sneak in and watch from a gap in the pillars, however, when Gingka pushes Masamune too much, they all end up falling in and get caught. They then get into huge trouble and a few Bladers representing their countries challenge them for breaking in and lose. Wales and Sophie then declare that they will battle them and Yu comments that he wants to battle as well and Julian comes out and says that he will battle against them, making it a three on three battle between Julian, Sophie and Wales, and Gingka, Masamune and Yu. The EU Bladers then reveal their Beys and where they are from: Wales announces that he is representing England and has the Blue Grand Cetus, Sophie announces that she is representing France and has the White Grand Cetus, and Julian announces that he is the team leader and is representing Italy. When the battle starts Wales and Sophie protect Gravity Destroyer. Yu then uses two of his Special Moves but Sophie stops them and defeats Yu with ease. Sophie and Wales then use their Special Moves and then their Dual Special Move. During their Team Move, Masamune gets an idea and breaks through their tidal wave using his Special Move, giving Gingka the chance to attack Gravity Destroyer. Gingka then attempts to use Star Booster attack, but him and Masamune both get defeated in the end by Julian's beast and the power of the combined attack. But in the end Gingka, Masamune and Yu lose.
68	17	"We Meet Again! Wang Hu Zhong"; Transliteration: "Saikai! Wanfuujon" (Japanese: 再会! 王虎衆 (ワンフージョン))	July 25, 2010	August 16, 2011 (AUS); November 26, 2011 (USA)
After their team lost to the EU team, Gingka, Masamune, Tsubasa and Yu decide to undergo intense teamwork training and decide to split into pairs. Tsubasa says that to decide the pairs, they will do rock-paper-scissors, to which the others agree. Tsubasa then says the 2 winners will be on one team and the 2 losers on the other. The first time is a tie. The second time is a tie. The third time is the same. After 7 ties Gingka says that that is useless. Madoka then uses straws to decide the pairs, which are: Gingka and Yu and Tsubasa and Masamune. Their battle eventually turns into a free-for-all 4-way battle. Hence they start getting on each other's nerves. This results in Madoka getting angry with them and says that the team is disbanded before storming off in fury. They try to apologize by bringing her a drink and a fruit basket, but she shuts the door on them, still furious with them. Later Wang Hu Zhong appear from nowhere and Dashan says that he hasn't seen faces that long in a while. Wang Hu Zhong then say they got into another tournament and that they are trying and get back into the Beyblade World Championships as a wildcard. Chao Xin then tries to calm Madoka down, first startling her upon when she thought it was Gingka and the others again trying to apologize, then forcing his way in to speak with her privately, and does so successfully, convincing her to restore the team and restart the training. Wang Hu Zhong impress them by standing on top of each other on top of a ball on top of a rock in this order: Dashan, Chao Xin, Chi-yun and Mei-Mei. Wang Hu Zhong train them by firstly tying a white ribbon around Tsubasa and Yu's ankles, and Gingka and Masamune's ankle. They then finish the team training with tag team battles: Gingka and Masamune vs Dashan and Chao Xin; Tsubasa and Yu vs. Chi-yun and Mei Mei. Gan Gan Galaxy them learn about teamwork. Then all 8 Special Moves are used and all 8 Beyblades are knocked out. Though the guys make Madoka believe they are going to squabble and infuriate her once more to the point of disbanding the team again, Mei-Mei asks Madoka if she knows who they are playing next. Madoka then uses her computer to figure out who they are playing and says the winners of the match between Team Chandora and Team Wild Fang. Dashan comments that the leader of Team Wild Fang uses a Leone, making the team wonder who he/she is.
69	18	"The Scorching Hot Lion"; Transliteration: "Shakunetsu no shishi" (Japanese: 灼熱の獅子)	August 1, 2010	August 17, 2011 (AUS); December 3, 2011 (USA)
Team Gan Gan Galaxy are relaxing together at a table, when Gingka asks Madoka to see who their next competitor will be. Madoka pulls up the information on her computer and it seems like it'll be Team Wild Fang. Madoka pulls up the names of the team members, Gingka and the group are surprised that the Team Leader is Kyoya. The scene changes. A lone cloaked figure, is traveling through a dry harsh landscape, dragging a coffin. He is stopped by a group of bladers who attempt to harass him. The group is provoked by the cloaked figure's silence and kick open the coffin revealing that it is full of rocks. The cloaked figure then jumps behind them and prepares to launch his bey, quickly defeating the group. The cloak's hood falls revealing that it is Kyoya. The group runs away. Kyoya continues dragging the coffin full of rocks, to a city where they are holding a tournament for the African Beyblade Team. The competing bladers are divided into three color groups and must battle in a battle royale style competition in order to earn a spot on the team. Competing Bladers, Demure and Marcus are competing in the same battle while Marcus's other friends are competing in different groups. As they prepare to launch their Beys, Marcus intentionally knocks into Demure, messing up his launch. Meanwhile, Kyoya is quickly clearing away the competitors. The remaining Bladers team up against Kyoya. Kyoya launches his special move, King Lion Tearing Blast and the remaining Beys are swept up in the tornadoes and out of the stadium eliminated. Kyoya is announced the winner. Nile impressed with Kyoya, anxiously competes in his battle to be part of the team. He goes on the offensive, eliminating his competitors. In the final round, Marcus manages to win his division. They are all presented with their bracelets. However, the three learn that the competition is not over. It is announced that they must battle to keep the bracelets for 24 hours. At the end of the 24 hours, the blader in possession of the bracelet will be on the team. Marcus runs screaming from the stadium as Kyoya and Nile look on with disgust. Meanwhile, Kyoya and Nile team up in the city battling large groups of bladers with ease. However, one Blader targets Nile and baits him down an alley while Kyoya is battling another large group of Bladers. Nile is led into ambush and is close to being overwhelmed when Leone comes and evens out the playing field. Nile finishes off the rest of them. Demure is watching hiding behind a box. Kyoya and Nile meet up with Marcus who has been hiding in a bunker. Marcus invites them to hide with him. While hiding in the bunker, the door begins to open. Marcus convinces Kyoya and Nile to hide but it's a trick; Kyoya and Nile fall into a trap and are hanging onto the ledge. The bunker door opens and it is Marcus's friends who were defeated earlier. They take the bracelets from Kyoya and Nile and leave them behind. Kyoya and Nile slip and fall into the sewer system and eventually make it street level only to be met by Demure who challenges them to a Bey battle. However they reveal that they no longer have their bracelets and tell her of Marcus' treachery. Demure tells them he saw them headed for the mountains. They catch up to Marcus and his friends and engage in a Bey battle. Demure has exceptional eyesight and is able to analyze the opposing beys and advises Kyoya and Nile what is going on. They defeat the three and recover their bracelets along with taking Marcus's bracelet. Kyoya shoves the third bracelet at Demure and they face the new hordes of Bladers after their bracelets.
70	19	"The Shocking Wild Fang"; Transliteration: "Shougeki no Wairudo Fangu" (Japanese: 衝撃のワイルドファング)	August 8, 2010	August 18, 2011 (AUS); December 10, 2011 (USA)
Gingka haves a bad dream and wakes up screaming and wakes Masamune up. Masamune wonders who made the noise and looks around only to realise that it was Gingka who was making the noise. Gingka & Co. later discuss Gingka's dream and Masamune says he could take out Kyoya in one hit. Kenta then runs into the stadium where the Team Chandora and Team Wild Fang match is being shown in Japan. Kenta then enters the stadium wondering where Benkei could be. The winners of the match will play Gan Gan Galaxy in the third round. Ryo then says that he winner of the 3rd round match will go on to the Block A Finals. Hikaru then reveals that Team Excalibur will play the wildcard entry for the right to play in the A Block Finals. Team Chandora and Team Wild Fang have a press conference. When it is time for Wild Fang to come out, only Benkei comes out, disguised as the Masked Bull. Only Wild Fang never show up. The Indian fans then start booing Wild Fang. Nile is up first and uses his Special Move to completely overpower the Indian team's first Blader. Kyoya is up in the second round against Solhan. Kyoya begins with the Lion Gale Force Wall. Sahan then uses his Special Move to neutralize the Lion Gale Force Wall. Kyoya then wins the second match with ease, ending Team Chandora's challenge, Kyoya then turn to Gingka and said only he can match Kyoya's grown power and challenges him and it's decided Gan Gan Galaxy will play Wild Fang in Japan for a place in the Block A Finals.
71	20	"Horuseus VS Striker"; Transliteration: "Tenku no kami (Horuseusu) VS Ikakkuju (Yunikoruno)" (Japanese: 天空の神 (ホルセウス) VS一角獣 (ユニコルノ))	August 15, 2010	August 19, 2011 (AUS); December 17, 2011 (USA)
The long awaited match has just started and Masamune faces Nile in the first round. Although confident that he would win at first, Masamune mood suddenly changes when his Striker is pushed fiercely back by Horuseus. Gingka tries to fire up Masamune's spirit, and Striker goes in for one shot with his special move. However, Nile calls up his special move as well, and in a flash, Masamune is defeated, leaving him in tears.
72	21	"Eternal Rivals"; Transliteration: "Shukumei no koutekishu (raibaru)" (Japanese: 宿命の好敵手 (ライバル))	August 22, 2010	December 6, 2011 (AUS); December 31, 2011 (USA)
Gingka and Kyoya finally meet in battle, their spirits fired and ready to go. A fierce clash is performed as Pegasus and Leone push each other to their limits. In the end though the match was a tie, leaving Tsubasa to decide the final battle.
73	22	"The Third Match: On The Edge"; Transliteration: "Gakeppuchi no daisan shiai" (Japanese: 崖っぷちの第三試合)	August 29, 2010	December 7, 2011 (AUS); January 7, 2012 (USA)
The episode begins with the end of Gingka and Kyoya's match. They struggle to fight to win but end up collapsing on the floor. The match is a draw. They are both taken to their rooms unconscious while their teams try to wake them up. Then Blader DJ announces that the final battle will determine the winner, who'll go further in the Beyblade World Championships. It is revealed that the final battle is between Tsubasa and Demure. Both Members walk up to the arena, but wait! Benkei and Demure both walk up to the arena. This causes confusion with the audience. Yu then jumps down from the audience and says that he will battle alongside Tsubasa, making it a Double Match. The match begins and it seems as if Gan Gan Galaxy is winning. Demure checks out Earth Eagle and he and Benkei use amazing tactics to outwit Tsubasa. Tsubasa then has second thoughts and his dark side kicks in. He destroys everything in his path, including his partner Yu's Flame Libra. The Eagle beast transforms into a Dragon-like bird, which swirls around the stadium, frightening all of the audience and leaving Hikaru traumatized, reminding her of L-Drago. Eagle then knocks every Beyblade in the stadium out except for Eagle, leaving him in a maniacal state. Team Gan Gan Galaxy wins and Tsubasa collapses on the ground, to the team's dismay.
74	23	"The End Of A Fierce Struggle!"; Transliteration: "Shitou no hate!" (Japanese: 死闘の果て!)	September 5, 2010	December 8, 2011 (AUS); January 14, 2012 (USA)
Once the stadium is repaired, it is decided that another tag team battle will end the tie between both teams. Yu, who was knocked unconscious in the battle earlier, asks about Tsubasa. Tsubasa is in the hospital now with tests being done on him. An injured Kyoya and Gingka join as partners despite their injuries and the damage to their beys. Both Masamune and Nile are worried, but stay focused on the battle. Masamune suddenly gets an idea of teamwork, and he and Gingka go in for the final attack. A huge explosion is made as all four of the Blader's special moves are unleashed and collide. Three beys stop spinning, but Masamune's Striker still lives on, bringing Team Gan Gan Galaxy the win and they move up in the Beyblade World Championships.
75	24	"The Creeping Darkness"; Transliteration: "Shinobi yoru yami" (Japanese: 忍びよる闇)	September 12, 2010	December 9, 2011 (AUS); January 21, 2012 (USA)
Gingka, Masamune, Madoka, Yu and Kenta are at the B-Pit speaking to team Wang Hu Zhong through video conferencing. They discuss Team Wild Fang and Wang Hu Zhong's upcoming wildcard match against Team Excalibur. Team Wang Hu Zhong tells them not to count them out yet, though Yu bluntly states they will probably lose to Excalibur. After wishing each other luck, they hang up and wonder about Tsubasa Otori's health. Meanwhile at the hospital, Tsubasa dreams that he is running from a dark force towards safety but before he can reach the light, he is overcome by the darkness that appears to take his form. He awakens in a panic. Later the Team and Hikaru visit him at the hospital. They discuss the previous match and Masamune brags that he won the round but also admits that Tsubasa and Yu also helped too. Gingka asks about his health, and Tsubasa is unable to answer, not knowing exactly what will happen now. Gingka then assures him that they will advance through the competition together. Tsubasa thanks Gingka and asks if their next competitor has been determined yet. The team starts discussing the wild card game between Team Wang Hu Zhong and Team Excaliber. Yu again states that he doesn't think Team Wang Hu Zhong will win. As this discussion goes on, Tsubasa hears a mysterious voice. He appears very confused to the others and Gingka inquires if he's okay. The voice tells Tsubasa to look over at the window and Tsubasa sees a reflection of himself speaking to him in the mysterious voice. Only Tsubasa is able to see it. It taunts him, asking him if he really thinks he's going to compete with the others. Then Tsubasa begins to have a burning pain in his chest. Hikaru rushes to get help. The others try to calm him down as he clutches his chest in pain. His reflection continues to taunt him saying Tsubasa is his and that it has grown quite comfortable with his body. Tsubasa gets upset and smashes the window. The rest of the team barely manages to hold him then. Meanwhile at WBBA headquarters, Ryo is reviewing all of Tsubasa's past battles and realizes something. As he does, Hikaru interrupts to tell him that there's trouble at the hospital. He arrives as a sedated Tsubasa is being wheeled to another room for further testing. He speaks to the group and shows them footage from Battle Bladers of Ryuga when L-Drago's dark power possessed him. Then he shows Tsubasa's battle a few days ago and the group is horrified to see the striking similarities. Ryo explains he believes during Tsubasa's battle with Ryuga at Battle Bladers, some of L-Drago's dark energy flowed into him. In the Battle Bladers battle, Tsubasa was possessed by the dark power for a few minutes.and Ryo says that Tsubasa was infected with l drago's dark power, As they can see, the dark power is steadily growing and gaining more control over Tsubasa. Due to its danger and its growing power, Ryo has cut Tsubasa from the team. The others protest but Ryo won't budge. Finally, Yu quits the team and admonishes the others for not following suit in solidarity for Tsubasa. Ryo understands their feelings and assures them that the WBBA will use all its resources to help Tsubasa but admits that they know nothing about the dark power, letting Tsubasa and Yu come back on. Yu brings up Ryuga, and Ryo considers it. A mysterious figure on top of the Eiffel Tower grins.
76	25	"The Axe Of Destruction"; Transliteration: "Hakai no ono" (Japanese: 破壊の斧)	September 19, 2010	December 12, 2011 (AUS); January 28, 2012 (USA)
At the WBBA Gingka and the others watch the battle between Team Excalibur and Team Wang Hu Zhong. Tsubasa is in the hospital, unconscious. Chi-yun prepares for his match and remembers the time he first went to Beylin Temple and meeting Dashan. Tsubasa wakes up and watches the battle between Klaus and Chi-yun in the second round, remembering his own battle against Chi-yun. Klaus gets the advantage over Chi-yun and breaks through his moves. Chi-yun snaps and tries to win, but is defeated, putting Wang Hu Zhong out of the tournament. Chi-yun is heart broken, until Dashan cheers him up. Tsubasa leaves the hospital after major pain from the dark power, which appears to inwardly burn him. In a cold, arctic land, Ryuga was then seen training inside a volcano there with his Meteo L-Drago, marking his first anime appearance since the episode Blader's Spirit, the season finale of Metal Fusion. Hyoma enters the volcano and meets up with Ryuga, commenting that he is a "hard guy to find". With the exception of making brief cameo appearances during the final battle with the God of Destruction Nemesis in Metal Fury, this marked Hyoma's final appearance in the anime.
77	26	"The Dragon Emperor Returns"; Transliteration: "Ryuuoh (Eru Dorago), futatabi" (Japanese: 竜皇 (エルドラゴ)、再び)	September 26, 2010	December 13, 2011 (AUS); February 4, 2012 (USA)
Gingka, Masamune, Yu, Kenta, Madoka, and Hikaru all search for Tsubasa after his disappearance from the hospital. Everyone fails to locate him, including his pet eagle. Meanwhile, Team Excalibur fly home after their victory. Wales and Sophie dismiss the idea of Team Gan Gan Galaxy beating them, but Julian reminds them that Gingka and Masamune did manage to break through their special move and should not be underestimated. At the moment, the plane lands, but Julian chooses to ignore all the reporters waiting for them accept one who asks him why he chooses Beyblade over anything else. Upon returning home, Wales and Sophie battle against Klaus and defeat him. Klaus is impressed with their strength, but Wales and Sophie are still uneasy about Masamune breaking through their special move. Klaus smiles, saying he would like to battle Masamune, but they point out that Gan Gan Galaxy are yet to choose an order to battle in. They hear Julian practicing the piano, and Wales remarks all the Konzern family are extremely talented. Back in Japan, it's been five days since Tsubasa's disappearance. As everyone reports to Ryo, Madoka worries about what could happen if Tsubasa's dark power runs wild whilst he's still missing. Ryo explains Hyoma is in the process of tracking Ryuga down, but Gingka wonders if Ryuga will listen to Hyoma, or anyone one of them for that matter. Masamune worries that Tsubasa won't turn up for their battle in Italy, but Yu reassures them Tsubasa will return for that. Meanwhile, Julian plays a piano at a concert. The audience appludes and wishes him luck in his next beyblade match. From up in the shadow of a curtain in the stands, a pair of golden-brown eyes watch Julian. Returning home, Julian takes Gravity Destroyer out into the forest while riding. His horse spooks as Tsubasa walks out of the bushes, demanding a battle. Julian recognies him as a member of Team Gan Gan Galaxy, and comments he didn't think it was the team's style to launch a surprise attack before a competition. Tsubasa explains he's come alone to battle and repeats his demand. They begin a battle, but the partially dark Tsubasa stops it and demands Julian to use reverse rotation. Reluctantly he agrees. However, just before they can begin, Wales and Sophie jump in and attack Earth Eagle. Just as it seems Eagle will lose, the dark power takes control of Tsubasa totally and sends Wales and Sophie's beys flying. Klaus questions what this dark power is, and Julian answers, claiming it must be some sort of evil presence. On a hill nearby, Ryuga watches the dark power, although merely comments: "That's all then?" As the dark power runs wild, Tsubasa tries to take control again, explaining he only wanted to test his strength against the best in the world, who he believed to be Julian. The dark power confronts him, explaining it and Tsubasa are the same and that Tsubasa subconsciously created it. Tsubasa denies this, but the dark power taunts him and explains everyone has darkness in their hearts, including Tsubasa. Even so, Tsubasa regains control as Eagle runs wild, smashing into everything. Just before Wales and Sophie can take advantage and finish him off, Ryuga interrupts with his new bey: Meteo L-Drago LW105LF. Whilst L-Drago proceeds to damage both Cetus beys, Ryuga tells Tsubasa the dark power he possesses is a small fragment of it, the last fragment in existence. He goes on to explain that the original L-Drago had gained power and lost its natural strength from the evil people who had used it. Meteo L-Drago is the result of much hard training, the original power of L-Drago without human interference. As Tsubasa ponders over this, Ryuga tells him not to resist the dark power, instead to become one with it. Tsubasa is silenced as he wonders about this, meanwhile Ryuga proceeds to use L-Drago to hurt Wales and then go after Sophie. Before he can make contact, Julian gets in the way, complaining there has been enough destruction tonight. Ryuga notices Destroyer is a reverse-rotating bey, but comments the only true reverse-rotating bey is L-Drago. Julian disagrees, and Ryuga smiles as he tells Julian they will decide that later. Oddly enough, Julian and Ryuga ended up never having a battle as of Galaxy Heart (the season finale of Metal Masters).
78	27	"Exceed The Limit!"; Transliteration: "Genkai o koero!" (Japanese: 限界を越えろ!)	October 3, 2010	February 11, 2012 (USA); March 24, 2012 (AUS)
Team Gan Gan Galaxy minus Tsubasa fly to Italy, where the finals are held. They are questioned about Tsubasa being in the hospital, and deny it. Just before the finals, Gingka and co. find Ryuga with Tsubasa, who falls to the ground unconscious. Ryuga challenges Gingka to a battle, and so Gingka tells the team to take Tsubasa with them and that he will battle Ryuga. In the Beyblade World Championships A Block final, Team Excaliber and Team Gan Gan Galaxy are ready to face off. Masamune faces off against Klaus. He is overconfident at first but comes to learn that confidence alone can't win him the battle. Meanwhile, Madoka bandages up Tsubasa. When she is done, Madoka is told to go on ahead to the battle. Tsubasa is then overwhelmed by a pain inside. When Klaus launches his special move Steel Darkness, Masamune uses Striker's special move Lightning Sword Flash. He wins the clash but Klaus goes over his limits to survive the explosion and then proceeds to defeat Masamune and Striker. Gingka launches Galaxy Pegasus and Ryuga launches Meteo L-Drago showing their beast forms in a head-on clash!
79	28	"Dark Eagle"; Transliteration: "Daaku Akuira" (Japanese: 暗黒鷲 (ダークアクイラ))	October 10, 2010	February 18, 2012 (USA); March 24, 2012 (AUS)
The episode begins with Klaus defeating Masamune in the first round and passing out after exhaustion. The second match begins with Tsubasa and Yu vs Wales and Sophie. The battle between Gingka and Ryuga continues and Meteo L-Drago is absorbing Galaxy Pegasus' strength. Gingka asks Ryuga does he do have the dark power, but Ryuga tells him that Meteo L-Drago is able do the same thing the dark power did. When Galaxy Pegasus gets trapped into the sand, Ryuga tells Gingka that he has not yet mastered its power. Tsubasa and Yu attack both Grand Cetus' but it has no effect. Tsubasa's dark power begins taunting him and takes him back to one of his memories where one of his rivals cheated in a battle as a kid. He loses control again and attacks both Cetus' and Yu's Flame Libra with Eagle's dark form. Yu then attacks Earth Eagle in order to bring Tsubasa back to normal. Another one of his memories shown with him finding a baby eagle and him taking care of it. While Tsubasa is fighting the darkness, Wales and Sophie used their joined special move, Grand Decallion. Tsubasa's last memory shows him defeating the kid that cheated him in their first match. When Grand Decallion swallows up Tsubasa, he reminds his dark side that though there are bad things, there is always light too. Tsubasa defeats the dark power and uses his new special move, Shining Tornado Buster, to knock both Grand Cetus' out of the stadium with both teams tied now in wins. Meanwhile, Ryuga used L-Drago to free Pegasus from the sand and tells Gingka to defeat Julian, saying that one reverse rotating is enough in this world and disappears.
80	29	"Gravity Destroyer"; Transliteration: "Gurabitei Peruseusu" (Japanese: グラビティペルセウス)	October 17, 2010	February 25, 2012 (USA); March 31, 2012 (AUS)
After Tsubasa and Yu defeat Wales and Sophie, it is the final match of the A-block finals between Gingka and Julian Konzern. Since his last battle with Ryuga, Gingka learned new strategies since Gravity Destroyer can be a left rotating bey. Gingka has a good start, but Destroyer's spin track is the strongest in the world. Julian uses the Eyes of Medusa to push Galaxy Pegasus down into the ground which would result in a sleep out, but Gingka will not back down. Using the light rubber flat performance tip and the spin track that goes in the other direction, he is able to increase its speed to defy the gravity and make a great hit to Destroyer. Gingka tries to go for the Star Booster Attack, but Destroyer counters with Black Excalibur. Gingka makes a memory of Ryuga's words, "It seems that you have not yet mastered its powers now have you?". He understands what he was saying and uses Pegasus's full power to make a new special move, Stardust Driver. Julian uses Black Excalibur a second time, but with Pegasus's new special move Stardust Driver, it breaks through Black Excalibur and once it made contact, Destroyer goes out of the stadium and Team Gan Gan Galaxy wins the A-block finals.
81	30	"The Midday Street Battle"; Transliteration: "Hakuchu no Sutoriito Batoru" (Japanese: 白昼のストリートバトル)	October 24, 2010	March 3, 2012 (USA); March 31, 2012 (AUS)
Gingka and the others are on a ship on its way to Brazil. Team Garcia are watching the battle between Team Gan Gan Galaxy and Team Excalibur. They arrive in Brazil and go to the stadium where they will battle. Kenta arrives there to cheer them on and brings info to Team Garcia. They watch the B-block finals with Team Garcia vs Team Star Breaker. They notice that both teams were not using their full power. Yu goes to find info on his own after nobody listens to him and meets a boy, Enzo, who they will tell him about Team Garcia if he defeats him in a battle. Masamune finds out his friend, Zeo is on Team Star Breaker while watching the battle. Two more bladers the battles and Yu finds out he has been ambushed by Team Garcia. He is about to win, but Argo enters the battle and destroys Flame Libra. Gingka and the others rush to the explosion and finds Yu on the ground hurt.
82	31	"The Brazilian Trap"; Transliteration: "Burajirian torappu" (Japanese: ブラジリアントラップ)	October 31, 2010	March 10, 2012 (USA & Canada)
The episode starts out with Gingka and co bandaging up Yu who was ambush by Team Garcia. The next day Team Garcia asks for the match to be a four on four match with immediate switchouts. The winner will be the team with the most wins. Yu is the first one to battle for Team Gan Gan Galaxy. His opponent is Enzo and tells Yu that beyblade is life for the Garcia's and that Yu is just taking it as a joke. Enzo uses his special move, Slumdog Driver and Yu uses his special move, Inferno Blast and as a result his bey is cracked and partially falls apart, and loses the first round. Masamune takes his place and defeats Enzo with his special move, Lightning Sword Flash. The next blader is Selen who keeps on distracting Masamune and defeats him. Gingka steps up and is about to battle at the end.
83	32	"The Explosive Cyclone Battle!"; Transliteration: "Bakutou! Toruneedo Batoru" (Japanese: 爆闘! トルネードバトル)	November 7, 2010	March 10, 2012 (Canada); March 17, 2012 (USA)
Gingka attempts to strike Ray Gasher but Selen's bey keeps dodging his attacks. She is successful but after some attempts Galaxy Pegasus successfully starts a series of attacks at Ray Gasher. Pegasus continues attacking and the power of Ray Gasher starts draining. Everybody starts to think that Gingka was going to win but then Selen told him that the fact is that she has never been defeated in a knockout battle before, not even once. But Gingka tells her that he is going to win but after hearing that the audience starts laughing at him. Gingka gets angry and takes an attempt to push Ray Gasher out of the stadium but Selen manages to escape. Gingka again tries to attack but Ray Gasher dodges every attack of his. Gingka asks Selen whether she even wanted to fight the battle but Selen replies that she does not have even the slightest desire to battle. She explains that her Ray Gasher does not have enough strength left for fighting so her policy is that when you can't fight, don't fight at all. She also says that this a knockout battle and when he can defeat her, he cannot face the next opponent. Tsubasa then calls out to Gingka and explains that she wanted to keep the match going until Pegasus's power is completely drained. Gasher then starts running away and Pegasus chases it and tries to attack it but Gasher dodges every attack of his. Then she says that she has been running her whole life since her childhood for her brothers. Pegasus is successful in doing one attack and it slows down Gasher. Pegasus attempts to attack once again to finish it off, but Gasher goes out of the stadium and lands on Selen's hand. Selen purposely withdraws from the game and remains undefeated. Selen then tells Gingka that she told him that she was never defeated by an opponent. Gingka gets angry that he got fooled by her. Ian tells Selen that she had done a great job but could have drained more of Pegasus's power. When Ian comes to the battle it is announced that the match was going to be a cyclone battle. All of team Gan Gan Galaxy members get shocked by that announcement because they never heard of a cyclone battle. Ian tells Gingka to prepare to face his Cyclone Herculeo in a cyclone battle. Ian asks Gingka whether he has the courage to accept the challenge. Gingka accepts and Ian launches his bey and both beys face off. Both beys are pushed away and Pegasus tries to strike Cyclone Herculeo but it dodges. Ian waited for the right time and when the time had come, it went to the cyclone point that rotated very fast. Ian said that it was just the beginning and he launched a cyclone attack at Pegasus and was set flying but managed to escape. Gingka goes into the cyclone point and tries to the cyclone attack but the cyclone point does not move. Ian tells him that he has to go there at the right time, only then it will work. Pegasus gets stuck in the cyclone point and Herculeo attacks him with his special move Blazer Slash. Pegasus is set flying again but narrowly escapes. Pegasus becomes really weak due to the damage taken and battles Herculeo but it goes back to the cyclone point. Now, Gingka wanted to send Herculeo flying but the cyclone point started to spin again. Gingka is shocked that it is working for Ian but not for him. Herculeo again launches a cyclone attack at Pegasus but escapes again. Ian says he used to battle in a cyclone stadium ever since he was a kid and remembers the cyclone time. Both beys clash once more and Herculeo again enters the cyclone point and launches a cyclone attack, but Pegasus survives. Herculeo again goes for the cyclone point but this time Pegasus interrupts and it goes into the cyclone point. Gingka says it is now his turn and tries to use cyclone attack, but Herculeo goes into the sky and attacks Pegasus from above, crushing Gingka's plan. Gingka then finds out a way to stop a cyclone attack. Herculeo goes for another cyclone attack, but Pegasus goes into the air. Gingka thanks Ian for showing him how to stop a cyclone attack. Pegasus uses Star Booster Attack to hit Herculeo and the cyclone point gets destroyed. Herculeo ends up in a stadium out and Gingka wins. Ray Gil suddenly comes into the battle when Gingka was rejoicing and Pegasus is out. Argo says it was a knockout match with no breaks and he should not have let his guard down.
84	33	"Charge! Ray Gil!"; Transliteration: "Gekisou! Rei Giru!" (Japanese: 激走! レイギル)	November 14, 2010	March 10, 2012 (Canada); March 24, 2012 (USA)
After beating Cyclone Herculeo, Gingka rejoices, only to be surprise-attacked by Argo. Tsubasa jumps in, and believes it to be an easy match since he defeated the dark power. But the power of Ray Gil's the Rubber Semi-Flat performance tip allows Tsubasa's Earth Eagle to be rapidly attacked. Ray Gil's clearwheel also prevents Tsubasa's use of aerial attacks. Argo only makes the situation worse, taunting Tsubasa so much that he nearly lets the dark power come over him again. Tsubasa feels the same pain as the Garcia's, seeing as he had to overcome the dark power gained from his battle with Ryuga earlier. Through the motivation and help of Gingka, Yu, Masumune, and Madoka allows Tsubasa to defeat Argo by finding a weak-spot between Ray Gil's metal wheel and performance tip. Using his special move Shining Tornado Buster, Tsubasa finally defeats Argo leading Team Gan-Gan Galaxy to the championships, much to Argo's dismay. Elsewhere, Ryuga is pursued by five mysterious guys. They corner him, but instead of using his launcher Ryuga launches Meteo L-Drago with his hand. As the five guys think he's crazy, they launch their beys. Because of L-Drago's spin-stealing capabilities, the bey gains spin and defeats all five beys with ease. Another mysterious person wearing a hood and a cloak outfit interrupts the match (later revealed to be Jack), and Ryuga comments that he might actually be able to put up a fight.
85	34	"The Friend's Name is Zeo"; Transliteration: "Tomo no mei ha Zeo" (Japanese: 友の名はゼオ)	November 21, 2010	March 17, 2012 (Canada); March 31, 2012 (USA)
Team Gan Gan Galaxy arrives in New York shortly after their battle with Team Garcia. Masamune runs off to go look for Toby. The rest of the team and Kenta go around the city before finding Masamune. Toby was not at the hospital he was in and Masamune goes to the Dungeon Gym to find out where he is. Coach Steel tells Masamune that Zeo has moved him to a hospital but doesn't know where. Masamune tells his friends about his history with Toby and Zeo. Zeo appears then and brings Masamune and the others to the old training lot. The two friends catch up, and Zeo tells Masamune how he went to train at HD Academy. Zeo gives Masamune the address to the hospital Toby's in now and then battles him. Zeo's bey, Flame Byxis has a tall spin track, making it hard to attack the fusion wheel. Masamune's Ray Striker delivers blows to Byxis despite the height of the spin track. Both Zeo and Masamune are about to call out their special moves but then stop them so that Toby will be able to watch the battle. Masamune and the others go back to Dungeon Gym and are then asked to battle with several bladers. Zeo is shown watching Team Gan Gan Galaxy and says darkly that he will never forgive Masamune.
86	35	"Our Slogan Is Number 1"; Transliteration: "Aikotoba ha NO.1" (Japanese: 合言葉はNO.1)	November 28, 2010	March 24, 2012 (Canada); April 7, 2012 (USA)
Masamune meets up with Toby and they take a look back into the past to when they met. Back then Masamune had just arrived from Japan and was looking for a bey-battle but nobody was available. Masamune found a bey-gym and went in meeting Zeo and Toby and also joined the gym. Zeo told both Masamune and Toby about a new bey-park opening up and to meet him there the next day. Zeo and Masamune both meet there but Toby is late, right before they start a battle with bladers from Team Gold-Bank and they are challenged to a battle. Vince is facing Masamune and when Masamune seems to become a threat to him the other two join in to try to destroy Masamune's Ray Striker. Zeo joins in to save Masamune but is blown away in one hit, Toby arrives and stops the battle and tells Team Gold-Bank to really battle them at the local tournament. Both teams make it to the finals and Masamune and Vince are facing-off, Masamune thinks there is no hope but when Toby reminds him they have to become #1 he miraculously defeats Vince. Masamune tells Toby to cheer for whoever he wants and challenge the winner so they can decide who is number 1 in the world. Gingka and the others find Masamune while wondering why Zeo joined HD Academy and become so strong.
87	36	"The Plot Thickens"; Transliteration: "Ugoki hajime ta inbou" (Japanese: 動き始めた陰謀)	December 5, 2010	March 31, 2012 (Canada); April 14, 2012 (USA)
Zeo is seen training outside and gets a call from the HD Academy and is told to go there. During that time Gingka, Masamune, and Kenta are off to the Dungeon Gym and they start a battle with everybody from the gym in it while Madoka, Tsubasa, and Yu are fixing Flame Libra and Earth Eagle. At HD Academy, Ryuga is battling training beys from the academy, he launches his bey with his hand and then uses Meteo L-Drago's spin stealing capability to win the battle. After the battle, Zeo is talking to Dr. Ziggurat about facing Ryuga to see the power of Meteo L-Drago and use that power to make the arrange system even better than it currently. Zeo tells him that he wants to battle Ryuga without using the arrangement system. Ryuga tells Jack to come battle him, but can't because his bey is not complete. Jack also revealed that he was the mysterious cloaked person at the end of Episode 33. Zeo enters the room and blames him and Gingka for making Masamune leave. Their battle start and Meteo L-Drago can't steal Flame Byxis spin power because of the spin track height. Ryuga tries to have Meteo L-Drago attack from above but Flame Byxis starts controlling its movement. Meteo L-Drago sends Flame Byxis crashing into the stadium. Zeo tries to use his special move but it wouldn't work. Ryuga uses his special move, Dragon Emperor Supreme Flight, and blasts Flame Byxis out of the stadium. After the battle, Dr. Ziggurat introduces himself and tells Ryuga that he owns the Dark Nebula to send him to Koma Village to get Lightning L-Drago and control its dark power but failed. After he failed, he created the arrangement system to make bladers reach their limits. He even brought him to the academy to observe him. Flashback scenes from Metal Fusion were shown, including when L Drago first awakened, and when Ryuga was controlled by the Dark Power during the Battle Bladers final match. Ryuga gets angry and destroys the room with Meteo L-Drago, leaving HD Academy and Ziggurat saying he won't let him escape.
88	37	"The Compass of Fate: Byxis"; Transliteration: "Unmei no Bikushisu" (Japanese: 運命の羅針盤 (ビクシス))	December 12, 2010	April 7, 2012 (Canada); April 21, 2012 (USA)
Zeo is in the arrangement system and is experiencing pain from it. Dr. Ziggurat says he should be able to endure the pain because he is one of the few people compatible with it Toby can be saved. Zeo screams Toby's name and remembering the time he met him to Masamune leaving to beat Gingka to become number 1. Dr. Ziggurat stops the arrange system because Zeo couldn't handle the pain anymore after 80%. He tells Zeo to after Ryuga until Damian finishes his arranging. Madoka finishes fixing Earth Eagle and Flame Libra for Tsubasa and Yu. Gingka and the others go to the sports arena so Tsubasa and Yu can test out Eagle and Libra. At the arena Masamune spots Zeo and follows him with Gingka chasing him. At the park they see Ryuga being circled around by him and HD Bladers. Zeo tells Ryuga to come back to HD Academy or he will bring him by force. Ryuga tells him to go on but Masamune interferes and is about to challenge him but an angry Zeo tells him to stay out of it. This is how Masamune and Zeo's long-time friendship became toxic for a brief amount of time. He also tells Masamune that he's done living in his shadow and challenges him to a battle. Damian finishes his arrangement and Dr. Zigurrat tells him to go help find Ryuga. Masamune and Zeo's battle start and Zeo uses his real power which shocks Masamune and Gingka. Ryuga tells him that it's the arrangement system and is challenged by the HD Bladers. He defeats them by using the power of Meteo L-Drago and tells Gingka to watch for the U.S. team while leaving. Zeo's Flame Byxis continues to attack Ray Striker until Gingka enters the battle. Masamune tells Gingka to stay out but Zeo continues to attack. He enters HD Academy to get back at Masamune and uses his special move, Destiny Needle. It starts to control Galaxy Pegasus and Ray Striker to make to crash into each other. Masamune asked him why he's acting so furious and Zeo told him that Toby's sickness got worse after he left. He also revealed that he met Dr. Ziggurat one day and joined HD Academy in order to put Toby into a better hospital. Eventually, Zeo would be against the idea of Ziggurat curing Toby's illness as this experiment turned out to brainwash Toby. At the sports arena, Damian looks for Ryuga but can't find him. Tsubasa asks him who is he and Damian tells him he's from Team Star Breaker. He asks Tsubasa and Yu to help him test out his bey, Hades Kerbecs, and unleashes powerful energy that Gingka and Masamune can see. Zeo stops the battle after finding out Damian has finished his arrangement. His battle with Masamune and Gingka would be cut short by this and he tells Masamune he will defeat him in the finals and become number 1 in the world. Gingka goes back to the stadium and finds Tsubasa and Yu on the ground unconscious with their beys destroyed again. Gingka recalls Ryuga's warning to watch out for the U.S. team and screams saying Team Star Breaker will pay.
89	38	"The Wicked Peacock: Befall"; Transliteration: "Kyouki no Bifooru" (Japanese: 凶気の孔雀 (ビフォール))	December 19, 2010	April 14, 2012 (Canada); April 28, 2012 (USA)
After they were humiliated by Damian in the previous episode, Tsubasa and Yu are in the hospital and are unable to compete in the final round. Gingka asks Madoka and Kenta who did this to them. They tell him it was Team Star Breaker's Damian and he remembers Ryuga's warning about the U.S. team. Ryo contacts them and he knows what happened to Tsubasa and Yu. He says that at the start of the world championships, he became aware of HD Academy but did not know its purpose. Hikaru says they gathering bladers all over the U.S. and train them to dominate the first world championships. Ryo says he will have to suspend them for attacking Team Gan Gan Galaxy, but Gingka wants to defeat them in the stadium. Ryo won't suspend them, but he's negotiating with the WBBA for a sub member to replace Tsubasa and Yu in the final round. Meanwhile, Masamune is seen upset about Zeo's claim that Masamune abandoned him and Toby and wonders what has been wrong with Zeo and why has he been accusing Masamune of abandoning him and Toby in a furious way. The match start with Klaus using his special move, Claw of the Storm, but Evil Befall takes no damage. Grand Capricorn uses barrage attacks on Evil Befall, but it still takes no damage. Jack says Befall has limitless stamina and will spin forever. Grand Capricorn continues its attacks but Evil Befall counters and its attacks to cut through the stadium. It clashes Grand Capricorn and leaves scratches on its fusion wheel. It also continues to cut through the stadium and chases after Grand Capricorn. Jack uses his special move, Befall The Ripper, to attack Grand Capricorn and cuts through the whole stadium. Klaus uses Claw of the Storm again to attack from the air, but Evil Befall counters it. Julian encourages Klaus to win and not lose a second time. Klaus begins to power up and Capricorn regains it balance. Klaus rips his shirt while Capricorn begins to charge at Befall. Jack uses his second special move, Beautiful Dead and Klaus uses his second one, Steel Darkness. Both special moves clash with each other causing an explosion. Grand Capricorn stops spinning while stand up in scratches. Evil Befall comes down to the stadium while still spinning. Jack wins and tells Klaus that he became a part of his masterpiece. Wales and Sophie run to go check on Klaus, but he isn't moving. It is unknown how he became so stiff or what caused this injury. Gingka and the others look on in shock. Jack gives his masterpiece a title called The Pitiful Baby Goat and laughs in joy.
90	39	"The Guard Dog of Hades: Kerbecs"; Transliteration: "Jigoku no Kerubekusu" (Japanese: 地獄の番犬 (ケルベクス))	December 26, 2010	April 21, 2012 (Canada); May 5, 2012 (USA)
Klaus is taken to the hospital after the battle with Jack. Before the next match starts, Damian asks Julian for a two out of three match because Gravity Destroyer can rotate both ways. Julian accepts and Dr. Ziggurat likes it because he needs data on a left-spinning bey since Ryuga escaped from him. the match starts with Julian using right rotation and Hades Kerbecs sends Gravity Destroyer into the air. Kerbecs begins to get the upper hand on Destroyer, but Julian switches to Counter Mode and uses the eyes of Medusa to stop its gravity. Hades Kerbecs isn't affected by it and attacks Gravity Destroyer. Julian uses his special move, Gravity Brave, and begins Destroyer begins to shoot gravity arrows at Kerbecs. Damian makes Hades Kerbecs stop and is hit by Gravity Brave, but still has no effect on it. Damian says he's done with Destroyer's right rotation and uses his special move, Hades Drive, winning the first match. Julian picks up Gravity Destroyer and launches it in left rotation. Destroyer charges at Kerbecs and sends it into the air and uses Gravity Brave again but the arrow scatters into smaller ones. He then uses his second special move, Black Excalibur, but it has no effect because Damian changed Kerbecs spin track to Boost Mode. Kerbecs continues to attack Destroyer, sadisitcally attacking again and again without knocking Destroyer out of the stadium, and Julian starts to lose confidence, but Wales and Sophie enter the battle, causing Team Excalibur to be disqualified. Julian, Wales, and Sophie use their special moves, Black Excalibur, Grand Fleet, and Grand Victoire. Damian uses his second special move, Hades Gate, and chains come out of the door, pulling Destroyer and both Cetus in. Kerbecs then bites Destroyer on the neck and shoot flames at all three of them. Gravity Destroyer and both Grand Cetus stop spinning, making Damian the winner. To add one final insult to injury, Damian forces Julien to admit he's weak. When Julien, completely demoralized and shattered, does so, Damian cackles demonically in triumph.
91	40	"The Furious DJ Battle!?"; Transliteration: "Hakunetsu no DJ Batoru!?" (Japanese: 白熱のDJバトル!?)	January 9, 2011	April 28, 2012 (Canada); May 12, 2012 (USA)
Gingka, Masamune, Kenta, and Madoka are eating at a restaurant, talking about their plan for the final matches. Madoka believes that having a replacement member would increase the team's chances of winning and that Tsubasa and Yu would feel bad if the lack of a third team member became the cause of their loss to Team Star Breaker. Gingka and Masamune reluctantly see the truth of her words, and Gingka suggests Kyoya as an option, however they realize that they don't know where to find him. Kenta proceeds to propose himself, but before the team can settle on it, Team Wang Hu Zhong comes in with pork buns, inviting them to dig in. They explain to them that they had heard about their problem, and they ask if one of their members could possibly be the sub member. Kenta stands firm about his desire to be Japan's third representative for the final battle, so they decide to hold a bey battle to determine who will get the position. The four members of Team Wang Hu Zhong and Kenta begin their battle at the Bey Stadium, and Gingka and Masamune eventually join in as well, unable to hold themselves back, much to Madoka's annoyance. All seven of them start their Special Moves, but Phoenix suddenly interrupts the battle and knocks all of their beys out of the stadium. Phoenix hands his mask to Hikaru and explains that the replacement member for Team Gan Gan Galaxy had already been settled on: himself. Everyone is shocked at his announcement, Gingka being a little embarrassed as Phoenix is his dad. Hikaru objects, and points out that as the Director of the WBBA, Ryo isn't allowed to join the team according to the rule book. Kenta and Team Wang Hu Zhong are not allowed to join either because they participate in the tournament already. Suddenly, Blader DJ jumps in, stating that he has come to save them. American DJ appears too, and it is revealed that the two DJs will fight each other in a bey battle to determine who will get the rights to announce the final matches of the world championships. They start their battle and begin announcing as if it were extremely heated and intense. However they actually aren't very good at beyblading because their beys are simply wobbling in one spot. As the battle drags on, the two DJs continue to announce their battle's "shocking moments", but everyone else groans at the irony. The two DJs then commence a tongue twister contest to see whose mouth is the most agile and deserving of announcing the final battle. After their competition, they see that their beys have started to slow down. They then decide to use their special moves to determine the winner with one hit. Blader DJ use his special move Blader DJ Scratch, and American DJ use his special move American DJ Crossfader. They make it out to be an enormous clash, but nothing really happened at all and the final result is a tie. They finally make the decision to announce the final battle of the World Beyblade Championships together. The two DJs make a public announcement about the final battle. Teams and people from all over the world are listening in anticipation.
92	41	"The Final Countdown"; Transliteration: "Fainaru Kauntdaun" (Japanese: ファイナル・カウントダウン)	January 16, 2011	May 5, 2012 (Canada); May 19, 2012 (USA)
Zeo and Dr. Ziggurat visit Toby before the final round. Gingka and the others visit Tsubasa and Yu, promising them they are going to win. Team Star Breaker goes into the arrangement system and Zeo stops at 92% because of the pain. Dr. Ziggurat tells Zeo he will cut off Toby's medical treatment if he loses. Gingka tells Masamune that he will battle Zeo, but Masamune says he has to because he doesn't know why Zeo is mad at him so Gingka lets him battle Zeo. Masamune and Zeo battle in the first round with both wanting to become number 1 in the world. Ray Striker starts attacking Flame Byxis. Zeo uses his special move, Destiny Needle, and starts controlling Striker. Zeo tries to make Striker have a ring out, but Masamune sends Ray Striker into the air to attack Byxis. Masamune tells Zeo he's gonna become number 1 in the world for Toby and Zeo remembers he can not lose and activates a button on his belt. Flame Byxis starts to become stronger and Zeo's arrangement starts to increase. Masamune use his special move, Lightning Sword Flash, and Zeo says if lose Toby will die. Masamune stops his special move because of shock. Once his arrangement reaches 100%, Zeo uses his second special move, Magnetic Needle Storm, sending Ray Striker out of the ring and knocking Masamune to the ground. Zeo wins the first round and passes out from the power and Dr. Ziggurat says he can rest for now. Ryo and Hikaru have now confirmed that Dr. Ziggurat is up to something, and Gingka is more determined than ever to win the next battle. Ryuga is walking towards the city for the final round.
93	42	"The Dragon Emperor Descends"; Transliteration: "Ryuuou, kourin" (Japanese: 竜皇、降臨)	January 23, 2011	May 12, 2012 (Canada); May 26, 2012 (USA)
In the locker room, Masamune arm is broken and wonders about why Zeo had to win their battle together. He tells Gingka he's got to win and Gingka says he will battle in next two matches. Dr. Ziggurat tells Zeo that Toby's treatment will continue and that he can rest. Jack starts shaking, saying he wants to battle. Before the second round officially starts, Meteo L-Drago crashes into the stadium and starts circling around it, with Ryuga catching it. He challenges Jack to a battle and replaces Gingka. Masamune says he will battle Jack, but can't because his arm is injured. He asks Gingka if they can trust him with the battle, and Gingka tells him Ryuga is strong. They launch their beys and both clash with each other. Jack has Evil Befall to continue attacking Meteo L-Drago. Masamune starts to get worry but Gingka tells him L-Drago can steal power and make it its own. Jack uses his special move, Befall The Ripper, but Meteo L-Drago dodges the attacks until Ryuga stops it and gets hit. Meteo L-Drago continues to spin and Jack makes Evil Befall attack and it starts to cut through the stadium. It makes a peacock on the stadium while attacking L-Drago and Jack uses his second special move, Beautiful Dead, to make Meteo L-Drago the peacock's eye. Jack names it The Full of Hot Air Dragon, Silenced By The Peacock. Meteo L-Drago then starts to spin faster from the power it stole from Evil Befall. Ryuga uses his special move, Dragon Emperor Supreme Flight, again, and Jack sends Evil Befall to counter it, but is defeated and becomes the peacock's eye. Dr. Ziggurat is happy because he has data on Meteo L-Drago now to study. Ryuga then sends L-Drago through a window Dr. Ziggurat is standing at and a piece of glass cuts him on the face. Ryuga tells Gingka that he will not allow him to lose to those fake Bladers in the next match while leaving.
94	43	"Spirits' Last Battle"; Transliteration: "Tamashii no Rasuto Batoru" (Japanese: 魂のラストバトル)	January 30, 2011	May 19, 2012 (Canada); June 2, 2012 (USA)
Gan Gan Galaxy talks about how Ryuga helped them, but Gingka tells them that Ryuga cared about defeating his own enemy. They wonder what he knows about HD Academy they don't. Ryo and Hikaru come in to show them a list of bladers that didn't a match in lives HD Academy recruited and Jack is one of bladers on that list. Ryo tells them those bladers started to come strong after joining the corporated academy. They tell them the owner is Dr. Ziggurat and owns a company called Hades Inc. Ryo says that he wants to show off his research through beyblade. He has Hikaru show them clips from Zeo and Jack's battle that an unknown power starts coming from them. He says Ziggurat is bringing out their hidden power through science. Hikaru shows clips that some bladers couldn't handle it and had to stop blading. Ryo also saids that HD Academy start searching for the right bladers that can handle it and the last three became Team Star Breaker. Masamune says Zeo said the same thing and he did it for Toby. Gingka said he will stop them and win, but Ryo saids Dr. Ziggurat is after him because he's perfect blader to test on. Hikaru tells him that Hades Inc. has close ties with the Dark Nebula. Gingka realized that Dr. Ziggurat was controlling them. Ryo say the Dark Nebula once set their sights on the dark power, but it took control of Ryuga and when Gingka defeated him, their plan ended in failure and in the final round they want to get their revenge against him. Hikaru says the opponent they chose for him is Damian Hart and there is no data on him. Gingka said Ryuga must have known about all of this. Gingka and Damian start the final round and launch their beys. Galaxy Pegasus attacks Hades Kerbecs, but it has no effect and is sent flying into the air. Gingka goes for another attack, but Pegasus is sent back again. Pegasus continues to attack Kerbecs and it starts to wobble, but Kerbecs power up and sends Pegasus into the air again. Hades Kerbecs starts to attack Galaxy Pegasus and push it back. Damian says that the scientists at HD Academy created the bey just for him. Gingka asks him do he have any fun with beyblades, but Damian says he doesn't know what fun is. Damian uses his special move, Hades Drive, and asks Gingka if he is weak now.
95	44	"Showdown! Gingka vs. Damian"; Transliteration: "Ketchaku! Ginga VS Damian" (Japanese: 決着! 銀河VSダミアン)	February 6, 2011	May 26, 2012 (Canada); June 9, 2012 (USA)
Damian uses his special move, Hades Drive, and Hades Kerbecs attack Galaxy Pegasus while its trap in the flames. Gingka remembers when Galaxy Pegasus was calling out to him when he first obtained it. Pegasus starts to power up and Gingka uses his old special move, Storm Bringer, but Kerbecs counters the attack and sends Pegasus flying. Damian uses his second special move, Hades Gate, and it pulls Gingka and Pegasus into the gate. Gingka wakes up in the underworld and sees Kerbecs holding Pegasus with its chains. Damian tells Gingka the bey spirit is weak against science as chains start to grab Gingka. Damian remembers when he was a kid at HD Academy and Dr. Ziggurat giving him a beyblade. Damian says his sole purpose is to win, but Gingka starts to power up, breaking free from the chains along with Pegasus. Gingka and Galaxy Pegasus charges at Hades Kerbecs while dodging the chains, but is knocked down. Damian tells him he still hasn't used his full power yet. Gingka tells him he still hasn't used his full power either. Gingka climbs on Pegasus and charges at Kerbecs again, head-butting him. He tries again, but is hit by lava and both of them fall to the ground. Damian wants Gingka to admit he's weak, but doesn't it and attacks him with Kerbecs chain. Gingka doesn't give up and Damian asks him why. He tells him his bey spirit makes that decision. He climbs on Pegasus again and charge at Kerbecs one more time, but Damian has Kerbecs to use its chain grab them. Gingka and Pegasus power up to break free from the chains and charges at Kerbecs, breaking free from Hades Gate. Gingka and Damian power up along with their beys for one final attack. Pegasus is sent back into the air again, but Gingka uses his special move, Stardust Driver, and Damian uses Hades Gate again. Both special moves clash against each other and Pegasus destroys the gate. The stadium turns into rubble and Hades Kerbecs stops spinning, Team Gan Gan Galaxy wins the Beyblade World Championships. Ryuga leaves after watching the final round on top of a building. Masamune and Madoka joins with Gingka at stadium and celebrate at becoming number 1 in the world. Damian gets shoked that he lost to Gingka ultil passes out, despite all his boasts and taunting, and Dr. Ziggurat says they are the real winners of the game. Gingka, Masamune, and Madoka are rewarded medals and a Beyblade World Championships trophy for winning the tournament.
96	45	"The Miraculous Spiral Force"; Transliteration: "Kyoui no Supairaru Fousu" (Japanese: 驚異のスパイラルフォース)	February 13, 2011	June 2, 2012 (Canada); June 16, 2012 (USA)
Team Gan Gan Galaxy is given a victory party for winning the tournament, but nobody is there except Ryo, Hikaru, and Blader DJ. Team Wang Hu Zhong and Kenta arrive and start a water fight with Gingka, Masamune, and Madoka. A helicopter arrives at the party and Dr. Ziggurat, Team Star Breaker, Team Garcias, and Julian Konzern come out of it. Ziggurat launches Spiral Capricorn to destroy the tables. He says used the tournament for his research and didn't care if he won or lost. He wants to use beyblades as energy source and created the Spiral Force. He created HD Academy for it and trained bladers for tournaments in order to collect data. He created Twisted Tempo, a bey with data from the strongest left and right rotating beys. He also has a blader named Faust to control it. Zeo realize that Toby is Faust and asks Ziggurat why is he. Dr. Ziggurat tells Zeo that Toby's illness has been cured and reborn as Faust through the arrangement. Faust launches Twisted Tempo to start the Spiral Force. Its power reaches 100% and wipes out a mountain, forest, and lake around Hades City. Dr. Ziggurat says he will supply it to anyone who offers him most. Gingka and Masamune tries to stop him and bring Toby back, but Team Garcias stop them. Gingka asks them why are they helping him and they say he's paying them. He asks Julian why is he helping him, but he doesn't answer. Dr. Ziggurat leaves and a battle starts between Gingka, Damian, and Jack in the streets with Hades Kerbecs attacking Galaxy Pegasus. Masamune and Dashan battle Julian and Argo in front of the building and their beys attacking each other on it while Zeo looks at them from the top of it. Rock Zurafa and Ray Striker goes to attack Ray Gil and Gravity Destroyer, but both land on the ground. Masamune and Dashan sends Striker and Zurafa to attack Ray Gil, but it goes through a window and attacks both through another window. Julian uses his special move, Black Excalibur, but is encountered by Nile's special move, Mystic Zone, and joins the battle. Flame Sagittario and Poison Virgo are sent into wall and begin to wobble. Chi-yun uses his special move, Tempestuous Whirlwind Sword, but is encountered by Enzo and Selen special move, Double Slumdog Driver. Benkei and Damoure join the battle and Benkei uses his special move, Red Horn Uppercut, to defeat both Ray Gashers. Damian uses his special move, Hades Gate, but is stopped by Kyoya's special move, True Lion Gale Force Wall. Kyoya challenges Damian and Jack, but both retreat for now. Julian and Argo also retreat with the rest of Team Garcias. Masamune goes to chase them, but is stopped by Nile. Team Wild Fang joins the fight to help Gingka and the others to stop Dr. Ziggurat and Masamune promises to rescue Toby from the Spiral Force.
97	46	"Charge! Hades City"; Transliteration: "Totsunyuu! Hadesu Shiti" (Japanese: 突入!ハデスシティ)	February 20, 2011	June 9, 2012 (Canada); June 23, 2012 (USA)
Ryo doesn't let Gingka and the others go to stop Dr. Ziggurat because of the Spiral Force's power. Gingka wants to stop him because he's using beyblades to make money and the Beyblade World Championships for research. Everyone begs him to let them go, but still's says no. Hikaru shows them Hades City and tells Ryo that Hades Inc. hasn't done anything illegal yet. She tells tower in the middle of the city is their headquarters and the Spiral Core is in that tower with Faust and Twisted Tempo. Wales, Sophie, and Klaus comes to help Gingka stop Dr. Ziggurat. Madoka stays behind to do something while everyone else go on ahead. Zeo goes to Toby and asks him if he remembers who Zeo is, but Faust tells him that's not his name. Zeo urges Dr. Ziggurat to turn Toby back to normal. Dr. Ziggurat says Toby has been reborn as Faust through the arrangement and his body became healthy. Zeo realized he was after Toby as well and wants him to turned back to normal, but Dr. Ziggurat has him locked away and told him to relax. As Zeo and Ziggurat's relationship became bitter, Zeo is then sent to a jail cell which he wouldn't be freed from until Episode 50, thanks to Ryuga's Meteo L Drago damaging the entire city and causing an "earthquake" that somehow opened Zeo's cell. This was possibly Zeo's punishment for not thanking Ziggurat for curing Toby. Gingka and the others arrive at the desert and are about to go to Hades City, but are attacked by Team Garcias and HD Bladers. They launch their beys and Argo use his special move, Keel Strangler, Ian use his special move, Blazer Slash, and Selen and Enzo use their special move, Double Slumdog Driver. Everyone gets separated and battle a member of Team Garcias and HD Bladers. Madoka finishes fixing Earth Eagle and Flame Libra for Tsubasa and Yu. Team Wild Fang battles Ian and Masamune and Team Excalibur battles Selen. Team Wang Hu Zhong battles Enzo and use their special moves, Tempestous Whirlwind Sword, Blue Dragon Whirlwind Sword, Soaring Fire Bird, & Storm Surge and send Ray Gasher flying. Faust continues to power up the Spiral Force and Dr. Ziggurat uses it to make Hades City come out of the ground. Ryo contacts Hikaru to tell them Hades City is rising and Gingka warns the others. Kyoya uses his special True King Lion Tearing Blast to destroy the rocks and leaves. Despite promising Ian that he will come back and have a real battle, the battle would never happen oddly enough. The HD Bladers launch their beys and Team Wild Fang launch their beys. Nile uses his special move, Mystic Zone, to defeat them but more comes and launch their beys. They tell Kyoya to go on while they battle them. Klaus uses his special move, Claw of the Storm, to let Masamune, Wales, and Sophie to go on ahead without him and more HD Bladers launch their beys. Kyoya, Masamune, Wales, and Sophie climb on Hades City while it is still coming out of the ground. Team Wang Hu Zhong are surrounded by HD Bladers, but they sent Dashan to Hades City and they stayed behind. Gingka, Hikaru, and Kenta run to Hades City and Argo uses Keel Strangler to attack them, but Gingka counters with his special move, Star Booster Attack. More HD Bladers come and launch their beys at them. Hikaru launches Storm Aquario and uses her special move, Aquario Infinite Assault, to defeat them and Kenta stays behind to help her. Gingka continues to run to Hades City, but Ray Gil comes out of the ground to attack him. Yu, uses Inferno Blast to stop Ray Gil and Tsubasa uses Metal Wing Smash to defeat him. Gingka gets in the truck with them and Madoka and Blader DJ drives close to the city for them to get on it. Dr. Ziggurat tells Damian, Jack, and Julian to remove Gingka and the others.
98	47	"The Fallen Emperor"; Transliteration: "Ochita koutei" (Japanese: 堕ちた皇帝)	February 27, 2011	June 16, 2012 (Canada); June 30, 2012 (USA)
Gingka defeats HD Bladers and continues to run to the tower with the others. As they are running, security walls come out of the ground to stop them, but Kyoya destroys them. More security walls come up, but Masamune destroys them. When they make it to the tower Gravity Destroyer changes the gravity to stop them. Sophie uses her special, Grand Malestrom, to stop Gravity Destroyer. She tells the others to go on while her and Wales battle Julian. They ask him why he join with Dr. Ziggurat and says he's not the Julian they know. Dr. Ziggurat tells him his family businesses, land, factories, and other possessions have been taken over by Hades Inc. Dr. Ziggurat tells him if he helps him, he will keep his family name intact. While Madoka hacks the computers to find where to go, more HD Bladers launch their beys at them and Gingka, Kyoya, Masamune, Tsubasa, and Yu launch theirs. Sophie tries to convince Julian to come back, but he continues to attack. Wales and Sophie use their special move, Grand Deucalion, and Julian uses his special move, Black Excalibur, to defeat them and after the battle he encounters Dashan, whom is sitting at the entrance of the Hades Inc. headquarters, challenges Julian to a battle. Dashan reveals to Julian that he had been waiting to have a battle together since Team Wang Hu Zhong's elimination from the World Tournament. Madoka continues to hack the computer and finds the Spiral Core, while Masamune finish off the HD Bladers. Gingka notices Dashan is about to battle Julian and decides to go on. Dashan and Julian launch their beys and Rock Zurafa begins to dodge Gravity Destroyer. Rock Zurafa absorbs Gravity Destroyer's attacks and sends it back. Dashan use his special move, Storm Surge, and sends Gravity Destroyer through a window. Zurafa and Destroyer begin to clash with each other and pushes Destroyer back. Julian changes to counter mode and uses the eyes of Medusa. Dashan overcomes the Eyes of Medusa attacks Gravity Destroyer. He uses Strong Arm Barrage, and Zurafa attacks Destroyer and Julian uses his second special move, Gravity Brave, but Dashan uses Solid Iron Wall. Julian tells him he reminds him of himself, but Dashan asks him why he joined Hades. Julian tells him the Konzern's were unbeatable and he lost everything with one defeat and has nothing. Dashan tells their not similar because he trains for beyblade, while Julian sees it as tool to control the world and for money. Julian uses Gravity Brave again, but Rock Zurafa continues to spin. Dashan uses Storm Surge again and Julian falls to the ground. Julian says he's weak and Gravity Destroyer starts to slow down. Wales and Sophie tell him to stand up and tells him their friends. Julian and Dashan power up and their beys begin to clash again. Julian uses Black Excalibur and Dashan uses his special move, Crushing Blast, and both special moves clash. After an epic, hard fought battle, Gravity Destroyer stops spinning, but Julian says there will be a new, stronger Excalibur. Gingka and the others continue to run to the Spiral Core.
99	48	"Befall's Trap"; Transliteration: "Gemiozu no wana" (Japanese: ビフォールの罠)	March 6, 2011	June 23, 2012 (Canada); July 7, 2012 (USA)
Hades City is flying over a city and helicopters are following it while Dr. Ziggurat begins charging the Spiral Force to destroy something else. Gingka and the others continue to go to the Spiral Core, but has to split up into two groups to find it. Tsubasa, Yu, and Madoka go through a hallway and see paintings on the wall with beyblades as the eyes. They find the arrangement system and Jack is inside of it. Jack finishes his arrangement and comes out of it, challenging Tsubasa to a battle. Yu goes inside the arrangement, thinking it's a bed and gets stuck in there. Gingka, Kyoya, and Masamune are cornered by HD Bladers, but they defeat them. Madoka tries to get Yu out of the arrangement system. Tsubasa and Jack launch their beys and both clash. Jack use his special move, Befall The Ripper, to make statue out of Tsubasa. Evil Befall goes through a pillar to attack Earth Eagle and Jack names the pillar, 'Practice Piece'. Eagle attacks Befall and sends it into a pillar. Jack has Befall go through another pillar to attack Eagle and names his third art, 'Distress'. Evil Befall goes through all the pillars and Earth Eagle dodges the broken pieces. Befall sends Eagle through a pillar and continues to attack. Jack regrets that his true masterpiece couldn't be fulfill at the World Championships. Tsubasa asks him can he understand the regret he had of not being able to participate at the final battle. Evil Befall continues to push back Earth Eagle. Yu launches Flame Libra and uses his special move, Inferno Blast, to get out of the arrangement system. Tsubasa uses his special move, Shining Tornado Buster, and Jack uses his second special move, Beautiful Death. Both special moves clash and Tsubasa defeats Jack. The pillars fall apart and Jack gets angry and Tsubasa names it 'The Peacock Gets Plucked'. Jack goes to get another arrangement, but Yu told him that he had destroyed the arrangement system. Tsubasa, Yu, and Madoka leave to go find Spiral Core while Jack cries over the destroyed arrangement system.
100	49	"The Wild Beast Unleashed"; Transliteration: "Houttareta yajuu" (Japanese: 放たれた野獣)	March 13, 2011	July 7, 2012 (Canada); July 14, 2012 (USA)
Hades City continues to fly over the city and the people look up at it. Dr. Ziggurat finds out that Jack has been defeated by Tsubasa and Gingka, Masamune, and Kyoya are getting close to the Spiral Core. HD Bladers try to stop Gingka and the others but Kyoya defeats them. Damian gets another arrangement to make him stronger using data from his battle with Gingka to stop him. Gingka, Masamune, and Kyoya run into dead end and gets trapped in the room. Damian comes in the room for a battle and Kyoya launches Rock Leone into the wall for Gingka and Masamune to go on. They launch their beys and Damian uses his special move, Hades Drive, but Kyoya uses True Lion Gale Force Wall to wipe out the flames. Kyoya use Wild Wind Fang Dance to attack Hades Kerbecs, but Kerbecs blows up the tornado and sends Leone across the stadium. He tries King Lion Tearing Blast to attack Kerbecs but it still has no effect against it. Then he uses Lion 100 Fang Fury to hurl the debris at Hades Kerbecs, but it dodges them. Kyoya increases the power to throw a giant debris at Kerbecs and remains unaffected. Damian uses his second special move, Hades Gate, and the chains pull Leone in. Kyoya goes into hell on his own and sees Kerbecs holding Leone with its chains. Damian tends to give Kyoya more fear for coming to hell on his own. Kerbecs three heads bite Leone on his neck and toss him to the ground, beating him with the chains. The chains try to attack Kyoya but he dodges them and gets set on fire. Gingka hears Kyoya screaming but continues on to the Spiral Core with Masamune hoping Kyoya wins. Damian stops the flames and Kyoya falls to the ground. He gets back up and tells Damian it didn't hurt, so Damian has Kerbecs shoot a fireball at him and continues beating Leone with the chains. Kyoya falls to the ground again and Leone gets rammed next to him. Damian tells him he can return to the world once he enter Hades. Kyoya tells him its nothing compare to his training against Gingka and Leone gets back up to. Kerbecs starts to back up in fear and Damian wonders what's wrong. Leone's roar shatters hell and pulls them into the wild. Leone slams Kerbecs into ground and Kyoya has Rock Leone to attack Hades Kerbecs. Damian asks him where does his power come from and Kyoya tells him from the wild. He tells Damian that in the wild you are alone and you can rely on own power. Leone continues his barrage of attacks on Kerbecs and sends it to the ground. Kyoya continues to tell him you have to become stronger own and Rock Leone sends Hades Kerbecs flying. Damian falls on the ground and lands in something. Damian sees Hades Kerbecs starting to slow down and starts powering up, making Kerbecs stronger against Leone's attacks. Hades Kerbecs attacks Rock Leone and its fusion wheel starts to shatter. Damian uses his power to put them back in hell and Kyoya powers up to use True Lion Gale Force Wall. Rock Leone rides the tornado to go in the air and Kyoya use his special move, King Lion Reverse Wind Strike. Damian sends flames in the air and both attacks clash. In the explosion, Leone attacks Kerbecs, shattering its fusion wheel and Hades Kerbecs stop spinning, defeated for good. Damian has a mental breakdown, unable to accept he had lost again, despite all his arraignment, and unable to understand how he lost, passes out in a dead faint from shock and disbelief. Kyoya simply retorts that "as long as you're on the end of a leash, you won't get it." Gingka and Masamune defeats more HD Bladers and made to the Spiral Core. Dr. Ziggurat finds out that Damian has been defeated by Kyoya and decides to perform one final test with the Spiral Force by destroying an island. Gingka and Masamune reached the Spiral Core and sees the power of the Spiral Core. Masamune tells Toby that he will rescue him. This episode was also released in Japan just 2 days after the 2011 Tohoku earthquake and tsunami, and on the Japanese broadcast, an emergency alert was shown on screen showing a map of the affected areas of the earthquake and also an advisory to take shelter and stay cautious if necessary. Ironically, the next episode featured an earthquake-like scene in a part where Ryuga launches Meteo L Drago to damage the Spiral Core, and it aired a week and 3 days after the Tohoku earthquake.
101	50	"Rampage! Tempo"; Transliteration: "Bousou! Horogiumu" (Japanese: 暴走!ホロギウム)	March 20, 2011	July 14, 2012 (Canada); July 21, 2012 (USA)
Gingka and Masamune reached the Spiral Core and Masamune tells Toby he will rescue him. Masamune runs to Toby, but Gingka tries to him because of the lightning from the Spiral Core. Faust tells him he is not Toby and doesn't know who he is. Dr. Ziggurat comes in and tells them that Faust was created through the arrangement and is the strongest blader. Gingka tells Ziggurat he will stop him from using Spiral Force. Dr. Ziggurat has Faust to increase Twisted Tempo's power making the Spiral Core stronger. Ziggurat tells them Tempo's rotation can never stop spinning and Spiral Force can continue to be supply. Hades City flies over the city and lightning bolts start striking down from it hitting the city. Dr. Ziggurat asks them can they defeat the ultimate bey with data from the world championships. Gingka and Masamune launch their beys to stop Twisted Tempo, but is blocked by the lightning. Ray Striker breaks through to attack Twisted Tempo, but is sent flying back. Galaxy Pegasus attacks, but is sent back as well. Gingka and Masamune decides to attack together, but their beys are sent crashing into the stadium. They try again, but it still has no effect. Dr. Ziggurat tells them Tempo's fusion wheel is the heaviest one ever created and the strongest defense type bey. Tempo pushes Pegasus and Striker back and Gingka and Masamune gets sent to a wall. The Spiral Force continues to power up to level 7. Faust uses his special move, Spiral Dimension, and it causes Hades City to shake. Gingka and Masamune gets pulled into another dimension and Galaxy Pegasus and Ray Striker are getting pulled into a black hole. Faust tells them the black hole controls space and time and no attack can stop it. Dr. Ziggurat looks on as the two bladers are frozen in time and trapped. Faust screams in pain as the Spiral Force increases power. Kenta, Benkei, Hikaru, and Blader DJ continue to chase Hades City as it gets close to the ocean. Gingka and Masamune get sucked into the black hole along with their beys. As the Spiral Force is about to be fired, Ryuga launches Meteo L-Drago into it. L-Drago destroys it and continues to rise up to the stadium where Gingka, Masamune, Faust, and Dr. Ziggurat are at. It breaks through Faust's special move and continues to rise out of the ground. Zeo escapes his cell after L-Drago destroyed the controls. Gingka and Masamune ride on Pegasus and Striker to escape the black hole through the opening L-Drago left. Tempo starts to slow down, but Faust makes it spin faster. Gingka and Masamune use the chance to attack and use their special moves, Stardust Driver and Lightning Sword Flash. Faust uses Spiral Dimension again and all special moves clash. Pegasus and Striker break through Spiral Dimension and Twisted Tempo is sent crashing into the wall next to Faust. He falls from where he's standing but Masamune catches him. Madoka, Tsubasa, Yu, & Kyoya arrive where the Spiral Core has b een critically damaged. Faust wakes up and tells Masamune he don't know who he is and goes to pick up Tempo. As Hades City continues to blow up, Dr. Ziggurat finds out that it will crash in 20 minutes if the Spiral Force isn't released, having triggered a massive meltdown of the core.
102	51	"Galaxy Heart"; Transliteration: "Gyarakushii Haato" (Japanese: ギャラクシーハート)	March 27, 2011	July 21, 2012 (Canada); July 28, 2012 (USA)
Hades City crashes into the ocean and has 15 minutes until meltdown. Dr. Ziggurat has a breakdown when he finds out that the core meltdown is going to happen and blames Gingka and the others for ruining his plan. Faust picks up Twisted Tempo and is going to make it a spin again, but Dr. Ziggurat tries to stop him, knowing doing so will speed up the meltdown. Faust tells him that it is his mission to keep Tempo spinning. Gingka says he's gonna stop the reactor with Galaxy Pegasus. Ziggurat tries to escape, but Kyoya launches Rock Leone into the elevator so he can't get in. Gingka and Madoka use the elevator to go to the Spiral Core to stop it. Kyoya, Tsubasa, and Yu goes to leave the building and Masamune and Faust have a bey battle. Ray Striker attacks Twisted Tempo but gets pushed back and Masamune gets sent back to the wall. Masamune tries again, but it has no effect and him and Striker gets pushed back again. The Spiral Force continues to charge, and Ray Striker attacks a third time, and it still has no effect. Ziggurat walks up the stairs trying to escape and is surprised to see Zeo break out of the cell Ziggurat sent him to 5 episodes earlier. They both have a short-lived battle with Zeo defeating him in one hit. It is possible that Ziggurat died when Hades City sunk into the ocean. Twisted Tempo continues to push back Masamune and Striker. Ryo arrives where Kenta and the others are at. Gingka launches Pegasus into the Spiral Core to stop it. Ray Striker starts to slow down, but Masamune doesn't give up and starts to push back Tempo. Faust uses his special move, Spiral Dimension, and Zeo launches Flame Byxis into it. Masamune and Faust end up in another dimension and Zeo crosses over to it with them. As Masamune and Zeo try to turn Faust back into Toby, the three transport to Dungeon Gym and Faust starts remembering his past and watches a flashback scene of when a young Masamune first met Zeo and Toby, and the three raise their hand to be number 1. Galaxy Pegasus continues to absorb energy but starts to shatter from it. Meteo L-Drago comes through the wall and Ryuga has L-Drago to help stop the Spiral Core. Pegasus strength comes back and raises into the galaxy to release the energy. Striker, Byxis, and Tempo stop spinning and the power from the arrangement leaves Faust's body, and he passes out. Masamune and Zeo run to him, and Toby turns back to his normal self, marking Toby's first appearance since being cured from his illness. This also marked the last appearance for Ray Striker/Unicorno, Flame Byxis, and Twisted Tempo/Basalt Horogium, as Masamune, Zeo, and Toby were all granted new beys in Metal Fury. As Hades City is on the brink of sinking to the ocean, Jack and Damian are seen on a ship along with several HD Bladers escaping the destruction of Hades City. Kyoya, Tsubasa, and Yu run into Gingka and Madoka and they leave the building. Masamune, Zeo, and Toby come out to, and Kenta and the others are outside as well. Pegasus comes back and lands in Gingka's hand badly damaged. Yu tells Tsubasa that Gingka has passed them again and it bothers him. Tsubasa tells him he will go on a training journey. Kyoya gets mad because Gingka kept the good action to himself, but Gingka tells him he wasn't alone. Kyoya tells him as soon as Pegasus is fixed, they will have another battle. Masamune wants to challenge him as well and that he's a part of Team Dungeon from now on. Gingka tells them he won't give up his number 1 in the world spot and Kenta and Benkei won't give up either. Gingka wants another world tournament to start sooner, and Ryo tells them that they will go back home to start training for the next world tournament.
