= Kunihisa Sugishima =

Japanese anime director (born 1959)

- Born: 1959 (age 66–67); Gifu Prefecture, Japan
- Occupations: Director, storyboarder

Kunihisa Sugishima (Japanese: 杉島邦久, Hepburn: Sugishima Kunihisa) is a Japanese anime director.

== Career ==
Sugishima started his career on Sunrise in the 1980s, having worked as the setting producer for Heavy Metal L-Gaim's episodes 1 to 18, as well as the director and storyboarder for other episodes. Another major work in his early career was his involvement with the Gundam series; he directed several episodes of Mobile Suit Zeta Gundam and Mobile Suit Gundam ZZ. His first work as the main director was in 1994 when he directed at Sunrise a single-episode special titled Shinizokonai Kakarichō. His subsequent works were not at Sunrise; he directed Gokudo (1999) at Trans Arts, Yu-Gi-Oh! Duel Monsters (2000–2004) at Gallop, and Speed Grapher (2005) at Gonzo. For the latter company he also directed the original video animation Strike Witches in 2007. After directing Nabari no Ou at J.C.Staff in 2008, he went on to direct four Beyblade-related television series and one film at Tatsunoko Productions and SynergySP between 2009 and 2012. He returned to work for Sunrise where he was the director for two Battle Spirits anime; Burning Soul (2015) and Double Drive (2016).

== Works ==
=== As main director ===
- Shinizokonai Kakarichō (1994)
- Tekken: The Motion Picture (1998)
- Gokudo the Adventurer (1999)
- Yu-Gi-Oh! Duel Monsters (2000–2004)
- Speed Grapher (2005)
- Strike Witches OVA (2007)
- Nabari no Ou (2008)
- Beyblade: Metal Fusion (2009–2010)
- Beyblade: Metal Masters (2010–2011)
- Beyblade: Sol Blaze, the Scorching Hot Invader (2010)
- Beyblade: Metal Fury (2011–2012)
- Beyblade: Shogun Steel (2012)
- Battle Spirits: Burning Soul (2015–2016)
- Battle Spirits Double Drive (2016–2017)
- I've Been Killing Slimes for 300 Years and Maxed Out My Level: Season 2 (2025)
- Mercedes and the Waning Moon (2027)

=== Other works ===
- Combat Mecha Xabungle (1982)
- Aura Battler Dunbine (1983)
- Heavy Metal L-Gaim (1984)
- Mobile Suit Zeta Gundam (1985)
- Mobile Suit Gundam ZZ (1986)
- Kamen no Ninja Akakage (1987)
- Metal Armor Dragonar (1987)
- Mister Ajikko (1987)
- Ronin Warriors (1988)
- Brave Command Dagwon (1996)
- 7th Time Loop (2024) for storyboard on episode 5
