= List of Go! Go! Loser Ranger! chapters =

Go! Go! Loser Ranger! is a Japanese manga series written and illustrated by Negi Haruba. It began serialization in Kodansha's Weekly Shōnen Magazine in the 10th issue published on February 3, 2021. Kodansha has collected its chapters into individual tankōbon volumes. The first volume was released on April 16, 2021. As of November 17, 2026, twenty-three volumes have been released.

In November 2021, during their panel at Anime NYC, Kodansha USA announced their license to the series and would release it in both print and digital.

On February 19, 2025, it was announced the manga was going on a two-issue hiatus due to Haruba's health issues. It went on another hiatus on May 7 of the same year due to the same reason. On February 18, 2026, it was announced the manga was going on a three-issue hiatus. On July 8 of the same year, it was announced the manga was going on hiatus for a fourth time due to Haruba's health issues. On October 21 of the same year, it was announced the manga was going on hiatus for a fifth time due to Haruba's health issues.

== Volumes ==
No.	Original release date	Original ISBN	English release date	English ISBN
1	April 16, 2021	978-4-06-522984-2	November 8, 2022	978-1-64651-509-7 (print); 978-1-68491-728-0 (digital)
1. "Round 1000" (R(ラウンド)1000, Raundo 1000); 2. "Find the Red Keeper" (レッドキーパーを探せ, Reddo Kīpā o Sagase); 3. "Paths of Good and Evil" (正道と悪道, Seitō to Akutō); 4. "The Immortal Bullet" (不死の鉄砲玉, Fushi no Teppōdama); 5. "The Monsters Strike!" (怪人の一撃!, Kaijin no Ichigeki!)
2	June 17, 2021	978-4-06-523575-1	December 13, 2022	978-1-64651-510-3 (print); 978-1-68491-832-4 (digital)
6. "Hammer of Justice" (正義の鉄槌, Seigi no Tettsui); 7. "Peace and Domination" (平和と制服, Heiwa to Seifuku); 8. "Parallel Paths" (交わらない道, Majiwaranai Machi); 9. "Sticky Hide-and-Seek" (ねっとりかくれんぼ, Nettori Kakurenbo); 10. "Emotional Weight" (思いの重さ, Omoi no Omosa); 11. "Hibiki Sakurama, Age 4" (桜間日々輝4歳, Sakurama Hibiki Yon-sai); 12. "The Plan Begins" (作戦開始, Sakusen Kaishi); 13. "In the White Dragon's Nest" (パイロンの巣にて, Pairon No Sunite); 14. "Dusters & Dragon Keepers" (ダスター&ドラゴンキーパー, Dasutā & Doragon Kīpā)
3	September 17, 2021	978-4-06-524852-2	February 21, 2023	978-1-64651-511-0 (print); 978-1-68491-919-2 (digital)
15. "The Fighter That Day" (あの日の戦闘員, Ano Hi no Sentōin); 16. "The Pink Siblings" (ピンク姉弟, Pinku Kyōdai); 17. "The Worst Pairing" (最悪あくのコンビ, Saiaku no Konbi); 18. "The White Dragon's Test: Vs. The Red Monster 1" (パイロンの試験VS.赤の怪人役①, Pairon no Shinken Bāsasu Aka no Kaijin'yaku 1); 19. "The White Dragon's Test: Vs. The Red Monster 2" (パイロンの試験VS.赤の怪人役②, Pairon no Shinken Bāsasu Aka no Kaijin'yaku 2); 20. "The White Dragon's Test: Vs. The Red Monster 3" (パイロンの試験VS.赤の怪人役③, Pairon no Shinken Bāsasu Aka no Kaijin'yaku 3); 21. "The White Dragon's Test: Vs. The Red Monster 4" (パイロンの試験VS.赤の怪人役④, Pairon no Shinken Bāsasu Aka no Kaijin'yaku 4); 22. "The White Dragon's Test" (パイロンの試験, Pairon no Shinken); 23. "Toward a World Without War" (争いの無い世界へ, Arasoi no Nai Sekai e)
4	February 17, 2022	978-4-06-525997-9	April 18, 2023	978-1-64651-697-1 (print); 978-1-68491-988-8 (digital)
24. "The White Dragon's Test: Vs. The Blue Monster" (パイロンの試験VS.青の怪人役, Pairon no Shinken Bāsasu Ao no Kaijin'yaku); 25. "The White Dragon's Test: Vs. The Green Monster" (パイロンの試験VS.緑の怪人役, Pairon no Shinken Bāsasu Midori no Kaijin'yaku); 26. "The White Dragon's Test: Vs. The Yellow Monster 1" (パイロンの試験VS.黄の怪人役①, Pairon no Shinken Bāsasu Ki no Kaijin'yaku 1); 27. "The White Dragon's Test: Vs. The Yellow Monster 2" (パイロンの試験VS.黄の怪人役②, Pairon no Shinken Bāsasu Ki no Kaijin'yaku 2); 28. "Yamato Kurusu, Age 12" (来栖大和12歳, Kurusu Yamato Jūni-sai); 29. "The White Dragon's Test: Vs. The Candidate Team 1" (パイロンの試験VS.候補生チーム①, Pairon no Shinken Bāsasu Kōhosei Chīmu 1); 30. "The White Dragon's Test: Vs. The Candidate Team 2" (パイロンの試験VS.候補生チーム②, Pairon no Shinken Bāsasu Kōhosei Chīmu 2); 31. "The White Dragon's Test: Vs. The Candidate Team 3" (パイロンの試験VS.候補生チーム③, Pairon no Shinken Bāsasu Kōhosei Chīmu 3); 32. "The White Dragon's Test: Vs. The Candidate Team 4" (パイロンの試験VS.候補生チーム④, Pairon no Shinken Bāsasu Kōhosei Chīmu 4)
5	April 15, 2022	978-4-06-527529-0	June 20, 2023	978-1-64651-698-8 (print); 979-8-88933-017-2 (digital)
33. "The White Dragon's Test: Vs. The Candidate Team 5" (パイロンの試験VS.候補生チーム⑤, Pairon no Shinken Bāsasu Kōhosei Chīmu 5); 34. "The White Dragon's Test: Vs. The Candidate Team 6" (パイロンの試験VS.候補生チーム⑥, Pairon no Shinken Bāsasu Kōhosei Chīmu 6); 35. "The White Dragon's Test: Vs. The Candidate Team 7" (パイロンの試験VS.候補生チーム⑦, Pairon no Shinken Bāsasu Kōhosei Chīmu 7); 36. "The White Dragon's Test: Vs. The Candidate Team 8" (パイロンの試験VS.候補生チーム⑧, Pairon no Shinken Bāsasu Kōhosei Chīmu 8); 37. "The White Dragon's Test: Vs. The Candidate Team 9" (パイロンの試験VS.候補生チーム⑨, Pairon no Shinken Bāsasu Kōhosei Chīmu 9); 38. "The White Dragon's Test: Vs. The Blue Keeper 1" (パイロンの試験VS.ブルーキーパー①, Pairon no Shinken Bāsasu Burū Kīpā 1); 39. "The White Dragon's Test: Vs. The Blue Keeper 2" (パイロンの試験VS.ブルーキーパー②, Pairon no Shinken Bāsasu Burū Kīpā 2); 40. "The Blue Keeper Vs. The Boss Monster Peltrola" (ブルーキーパーVS.試験ペルトロラ, Burū Kīpā Bāsasu Kanbu Perutorora); 41. "The White Dragon's Test: Vs. The Boss Monster Peltrola 1" (パイロンの試験VS.幹部ペルトロラ①, Pairon no Shinken Bāsasu Kanbu Perutorora 1); 42. "The White Dragon's Test: Vs. The Boss Monster Peltrola 2" (パイロンの試験VS.幹部ペルトロラ②, Pairon no Shinken Bāsasu Kanbu Perutorora 2)
6	July 15, 2022	978-4-06-528429-2	August 22, 2023 (digital); August 29, 2023 (print)	979-8-88933-174-2 (digital); 978-1-64651-828-9 (print)
43. "The White Dragon's Test: Vs. The Boss Monster Peltrola 3" (パイロンの試験VS.幹部ペルトロラ③, Pairon no Shinken Bāsasu Kanbu Perutorora 3); 44. "The White Dragon's Test: Vs. The Boss Monster Peltrola 4" (パイロンの試験VS.幹部ペルトロラ④, Pairon no Shinken Bāsasu Kanbu Perutorora 4); 45. "The White Dragon's Test: Vs. The Boss Monster Peltrola 5" (パイロンの試験VS.幹部ペルトロラ⑤, Pairon no Shinken Bāsasu Kanbu Perutorora 5); 46. "The White Dragon's Test: Vs. The Boss Monster Peltrola 6" (パイロンの試験VS.幹部ペルトロラ⑥, Pairon no Shinken Bāsasu Kanbu Perutorora 6); 47. "Shougo Aoshima, Age 18 1" (青嶋庄吾18歳①, Aoshima Shōgo Jūhachi-sai 1); 48. "Shougo Aoshima, Age 18 2" (青嶋庄吾18歳②, Aoshima Shōgo Jūhachi-sai 2); 49. "Fighter D, Age 0" (戦闘員D0歳, Sentōin D Zero-sai); 50. "The White Dragon's Test: Vs. The Blue Keeper 3" (パイロンの試験VS.ブルーキーパー③, Pairon no Shinken Bāsasu Burū Kīpā 3); 51. "Breaking News" (ニュース速報, Nyūsu Sokuhō); 52. "Vanishing Point" (姉と弟と神隠し, Ane to Otōto to Kamigakushi)
7	October 17, 2022	978-4-06-529432-1	October 24, 2023	978-1-64651-894-4 (print); 979-8-88933-303-6 (digital)
53. "The Squadron on the Edge" (限界部隊, Genkai Butai) (Note: This chapter is titled "Squadron on the Edge" in the English volume release.); 54. "A Friendly Visit" (愛想の奇襲, Aiso no Kishū) (Note: This chapter is titled "A Friendly Ambush" in the English volume release.); 55. "High School Paradise 1" (夢の学園生活①, Yume no Gakuen Seikatsu 1) (Note: This chapter is titled "The Dream School Life 1" in the English volume release.); 56. "High School Paradise 2" (夢の学園生活②, Yume no Gakuen Seikatsu 2) (Note: This chapter is titled "The Dream School Life 2" in the English volume release.); 57. "High School Paradise 3" (夢の学園生活③, Yume no Gakuen Seikatsu 3) (Note: This chapter is titled "The Dream School Life 3" in the English volume release.); 58. "High School Paradise 4" (夢の学園生活④, Yume no Gakuen Seikatsu 4) (Note: This chapter is titled "The Dream School Life 4" in the English volume release.); 59. "High School Paradise 5" (夢の学園生活⑤, Yume no Gakuen Seikatsu 5) (Note: This chapter is titled "The Dream School Life 5" in the English volume release.); 60. "High School Paradise 6" (夢の学園生活⑥, Yume no Gakuen Seikatsu 6) (Note: This chapter is titled "The Dream School Life 6" in the English volume release.); 61. "High School Paradise 7" (夢の学園生活⑦, Yume no Gakuen Seikatsu 7) (Note: This chapter is titled "The Dream School Life 7" in the English volume release.); 62. "High School Paradise 8" (夢の学園生活⑧, Yume no Gakuen Seikatsu 8) (Note: This chapter is titled "The Dream School Life 8" in the English volume release.)
8	December 16, 2022	978-4-06-529941-8	January 16, 2024	978-1-64651-895-1 (print); 979-8-88933-399-9 (digital)
63. "Kanon Hisui, Age Eight" (翡翠かのん 8歳, Hisui Kanon Hachi-sai) (Note: This chapter is titled "Kanon Hisui, Age 8" in the English volume release.); 64. "High School Paradise" (夢の学園生活⑨, Yume no Gakuen Seikatsu 9) (Note: This chapter is titled "The Dream School Life 9" in the English volume release.); 65. "High School Paradise 10" (夢の学園生活⑩, Yume no Gakuen Seikatsu 10) (Note: This chapter is titled "The Dream School Life 10" in the English volume release.); 66. "High School Paradise 11" (夢の学園生活⑪, Yume no Gakuen Seikatsu 11) (Note: This chapter is titled "The Dream School Life 11" in the English volume release.); 67. "High School Paradise 12" (夢の学園生活⑫, Yume no Gakuen Seikatsu 12) (Note: This chapter is titled "The Dream School Life 12" in the English volume release.); 68. "High School Paradise 13" (夢の学園生活⑬, Yume no Gakuen Seikatsu 13) (Note: This chapter is titled "The Dream School Life 13" in the English volume release.); 69. "High School Paradise 14" (夢の学園生活⑭, Yume no Gakuen Seikatsu 14) (Note: This chapter is titled "The Dream School Life 14" in the English volume release.); 70. "Dream's End" (夢の終わり, Yume no Owari) (Note: This chapter is titled "The Dream Ends" in the English volume release.); 71. "A Tiny Banquet" (小さな大直会, Chīsana Dai Nao Rai) (Note: This chapter is titled "A Small Sacred Banquet" in the English volume release.); 72. "Next on the List" (次の標的へ, Tsugi no Hyōteki e) (Note: This chapter is titled "On to the Next Target" in the English volume release.)
9	March 16, 2023	978-4-06-530920-9	March 12, 2024	979-8-88877-043-6 (print); 979-8-88933-519-1 (digital)
73. "An Unknown Monster" (未知の怪人, Michi no Kaijin) (Note: This chapter is titled "The Unknown Monster" in the English volume release.); 74. "The World's Most Famous Monster" (この世で一番有名な怪人, Konoyo de Ichiban Yūmeina Kaijin) (Note: This chapter is titled "The Most Famous Monster in the World" in the English volume release.); 75. "Stalking Date" (ストーキングデート, Sutōkingudēto) (Note: This chapter is titled "A Stalking Date" in the English volume release.); 76. "Turning Around" (逆向きになってる, Gyaku-muki ni Natteru) (Note: This chapter is titled "Facing the Other Way" in the English volume release.); 77. "Labyrinth" (迷路, Meiro); 78. "Half-Hearted Assassination" (その程度の暗殺, Sono Teido no Ansatsu) (Note: This chapter is titled "An Assassination That Meaningless" in the English volume release.); 79. "Fighter D's Research" (戦闘員Dの研究, Sentōin D no Kenkyū); 80. "Zoo of Beasts 1" (怪獣の園①, Kaijū no En 1) (Note: This chapter is titled "The Garden of Monsters 1" in the English volume release.); 81. "Zoo of Beasts 2" (怪獣の園②, Kaijū no En 2) (Note: This chapter is titled "The Garden of Monsters 2" in the English volume release.); 82. "Zoo of Beasts 3" (怪獣の園③, Kaijū no En 3) (Note: This chapter is titled "The Garden of Monsters 3" in the English volume release.)
10	June 15, 2023	978-4-06-531890-4	May 21, 2024	979-8-88877-044-3 (print); 979-8-88933-608-2 (digital)
83. "Monster Life Crisis" (怪人ライフクライシス, Kaijin Raifu Kuraishisu) (Note: This chapter is titled "Monster-Life Crisis" in the English volume release.); 84. "The Yellow Squad's Abhorrent Experiments" (忌まわしきイエロー部隊の実験, Imawashiki Ierō Butai no Jikken) (Note: This chapter is titled "The Loathsome Yellow Squadron's Experiment" in the English volume release.); 85. "Welcome to the Monster Aid Society 1" (ようこそ怪人保護協会へ①, Yōkoso Kaijin Hogo Kyōkai e 1) (Note: This chapter is titled "Welcome to the Monster Protection Society 1" in the English volume release.); 86. "Welcome to the Monster Aid Society 2" (ようこそ怪人保護協会へ②, Yōkoso Kaijin Hogo Kyōkai e 2) (Note: This chapter is titled "Welcome to the Monster Protection Society 2" in the English volume release.); 87. "Welcome to the Monster Aid Society 3" (ようこそ怪人保護協会へ③, Yōkoso Kaijin Hogo Kyōkai e 3) (Note: This chapter is titled "Welcome to the Monster Protection Society 3" in the English volume release.); 88. "The Justice Show" (どっちの正義ショー, Dotchi no Seigi Shō) (Note: This chapter is titled "A Show of Justice" in the English volume release.); 89. "Victory By Default" (不戦勝, Fusenshō); 90. "The Winning Horse" (勝ち馬, Kachi-ba) (Note: This chapter is titled "The Strong Favorite" in the English volume release.); 91. "Fight Among Yourselves!" (勝手に戦え！, Katte ni Tatakae!) (Note: This chapter is titled "Fight by Yourself!" in the English volume release.); 92. "Fight for Yourself!" (身勝手に戦え！, Migatte ni Tatakae!)
11	September 14, 2023	978-4-06-532887-3	August 27, 2024	979-8-88877-045-0 (print); 979-8-89478-043-6 (digital)
93. "Monster Aid Battle 1" (戦保怪戦①, Senpo Kaisen 1) (Note: This chapter is titled "Three Way Melee 1" in the English volume release.); 94. "Kaede Ukyo, Age 18 Juuji Sazan, Age 16" (右京楓18歳 左山十字16歳, Ukyō Kaede Jūhachi-sai, Sazan Jūji Jūroku-sai) (Note: This chapter is titled "Kaede Ukyo, Age 18 Juji Sazan, Age 16" in the English volume release.); 95. "Monster Aid Battle 2" (戦保怪戦②, Senpo Kaisen 2) (Note: This chapter is titled "Three Way Melee 2" in the English volume release.); 96. "Monster Aid Battle 3" (戦保怪戦③, Senpo Kaisen 3) (Note: This chapter is titled "Three Way Melee 3" in the English volume release.); 97. "Monster Aid Battle 4" (戦保怪戦④, Senpo Kaisen 4) (Note: This chapter is titled "Three Way Melee 4" in the English volume release.); 98. "Keisuke Souma, Age 17" (蒼馬圭介17歳, Sōma Keisuke Jūnana-sai); 99. "Monster Aid Battle 5" (戦保怪戦⑤, Senpo Kaisen 5) (Note: This chapter is titled "Three Way Melee 5" in the English volume release.); 100. "Monster Aid Battle 6" (戦保怪戦⑥, Senpo Kaisen 6) (Note: This chapter is titled "Three Way Melee 6" in the English volume release.); 101. "Monster Aid Battle 7" (戦保怪戦⑦, Senpo Kaisen 7) (Note: This chapter is titled "Three Way Melee 7" in the English volume release.); 102. "Monster Aid Battle 8" (戦保怪戦⑧, Senpo Kaisen 8) (Note: This chapter is titled "Three Way Melee 8" in the English volume release.)
12	November 16, 2023	978-4-06-533515-4	February 18, 2025 (digital); March 11, 2025 (print)	979-8-89478-411-3 (digital); 979-8-88877-269-0 (print)
103. "Akane Yamabuki, Age 10, 17, and 23" (山吹茜10・17・23歳, Yamabuki Akane Jū, Jūnana, Nijūsan-sai) (Note: This chapter is titled "Akane Yamabuki, Age 10/17/23" in the English volume release.); 104. "Monster Aid Battle 9" (戦保怪戦⑨, Senpo Kaisen 9) (Note: This chapter is titled "Three Way Melee 9" in the English volume release.); 105. "Monster Aid Battle 10" (戦保怪戦⑩, Senpo Kaisen 10) (Note: This chapter is titled "Three Way Melee 10" in the English volume release.); 106. "Monster Aid Battle 11" (戦保怪戦⑪, Senpo Kaisen 11) (Note: This chapter is titled "Three Way Melee 11" in the English volume release.); 107. "Monster Aid Battle 12" (戦保怪戦⑫, Senpo Kaisen 12) (Note: This chapter is titled "Three Way Melee 12" in the English volume release.); 108. "Monster Aid Battle 13" (戦保怪戦⑬, Senpo Kaisen 13) (Note: This chapter is titled "Three Way Melee 13" in the English volume release.); 109. "Monster Aid Battle 14" (戦保怪戦⑭, Senpo Kaisen 14) (Note: This chapter is titled "Three Way Melee 14" in the English volume release.); 110. "Monster Aid Battle 15" (戦保怪戦⑮, Senpo Kaisen 15) (Note: This chapter is titled "Three Way Melee 15" in the English volume release.); 111. "Monster Aid Battle 16" (戦保怪戦⑯, Senpo Kaisen 16) (Note: This chapter is titled "Three Way Melee 16" in the English volume release.); 112. "Sesera Sakurama, Age 13" (桜間世々良13歳, Sakurama Sesera Jūsan-sai)
13	February 16, 2024	978-4-06-534553-5	May 20, 2025	979-8-88877-334-5 (print); 979-8-89478-565-3 (digital)
113. "Monster Aid Battle 17" (戦保怪戦⑰, Senpo Kaisen 17) (Note: This chapter is titled "Three Way Melee 17" in the English volume release.); 114. "Monster Aid Battle 18" (戦保怪戦⑱, Senpo Kaisen 18) (Note: This chapter is titled "Three Way Melee 18" in the English volume release.); 115. "Angel Usukubo, Age 4" (薄久保天使(えんじぇる)4歳, Usukubo Enjeru Yon-sai); 116. "Monster Aid Battle 19" (戦保怪戦⑲, Senpo Kaisen 19) (Note: This chapter is titled "Three Way Melee 19" in the English volume release.); 117. "The Changed Real, Age 20" (千萬の歳月(ザ・チェンジドリアル) 20歳, Za Chenjido Riaru Nijū-sai) (Note: This chapter is titled "The Change De Real, Age 20" in the English volume release.); 118. "Monster Aid Battle 20" (戦保怪戦⑳, Senpo Kaisen 20) (Note: This chapter is titled "Three Way Melee 20" in the English volume release.); 119. "Monster Aid Battle 21" (戦保怪戦㉑, Senpo Kaisen 21) (Note: This chapter is titled "Three Way Melee 21" in the English volume release.); 120. "Monster Aid Battle 22" (戦保怪戦㉒, Senpo Kaisen 22) (Note: This chapter is titled "Three Way Melee 22" in the English volume release.); 121. "Yakushi Usukubo, Age 18, 1" (薄久保薬師18歳①, Usukubo Yakushi Jūhachi-sai 1) (Note: This chapter is titled "Yakushi Usukubo, Age 18 1" in the English volume release.); 122. "Yakushi Usukubo, Age 18, 2" (薄久保薬師18歳②, Usukubo Yakushi Jūhachi-sai 2) (Note: This chapter is titled "Yakushi Usukubo, Age 18 2" in the English volume release.)
14	May 16, 2024	978-4-06-535511-4	August 19, 2025	979-8-88877-413-7 (print); 979-8-89478-673-5 (digital)
123. "Monster Aid Battle 23" (戦保怪戦㉓, Senpo Kaisen 23) (Note: This chapter is titled "Three Way Melee 23" in the English volume release.); 124. "Monster Aid Battle 24" (戦保怪戦㉔, Senpo Kaisen 24) (Note: This chapter is titled "Three Way Melee 24" in the English volume release.); 125. "Monster Aid Battle 25" (戦保怪戦㉕, Senpo Kaisen 25) (Note: This chapter is titled "Three Way Melee 25" in the English volume release.); 126. "Interval" (インターバル, Intābaru); 127. "A Pure-White Red" (真っ白な赤, Masshirona Aka) (Note: This chapter is titled "A Pure White Red" in the English volume release.); 128. "Home Party" (ホームパーティ, Hōmu Pāti) (Note: This chapter is titled "House Party" in the English volume release.); 129. "An Official Investigation" (御用改めである, Goyō Aratamedearu) (Note: This chapter is titled "We're Coming In" in the English volume release.); 130. "Revenge Is Best Served After Remembering" (復讐は想起のあとで, Fukushū wa Sōki no Ato de) (Note: This chapter is titled "Revenge Comes After Remembrance" in the English volume release.); 131. "Character" (キャラクター, Kyarakutā); 132. "Revamping" (テコ入れ, Tekoire) (Note: This chapter is titled "Propped Up" in the English volume release.)
15	July 17, 2024	978-4-06-536156-6	November 18, 2025	979-8-88877-433-5 (print); 979-8-89478-750-3 (digital)
133. "Revenge Match 1" (リベンジマッチ①, Ribenji Matchi 1) (Note: This chapter is titled "Rematch 1" in the English volume release.); 134. "Revenge Match 2" (リベンジマッチ②, Ribenji Matchi 2) (Note: This chapter is titled "Rematch 2" in the English volume release.); 135. "Career Advancement" (キャリアアップ, Kyaria Appu) (Note: This chapter is titled "Career Boost" in the English volume release.); 136. "Chop Man and the Pink Squadron 1" (チョップマンとピンク部隊①, Choppu Man to Pinku Butai 1) (Note: This chapter is titled "Chopman and the Pink Squad 1" in the English volume release.); 137. "Chop Man and the Pink Squadron 2" (チョップマンとピンク部隊②, Choppu Man to Pinku Butai 2) (Note: This chapter is titled "Chopman and the Pink Squad 2" in the English volume release.); 138. "Chop Man and the Pink Squadron 3" (チョップマンとピンク部隊③, Choppu Man to Pinku Butai 3) (Note: This chapter is titled "Chopman and the Pink Squad 3" in the English volume release.); 139. "Chop Man and the Pink Squadron 4" (チョップマンとピンク部隊④, Choppu Man to Pinku Butai 4) (Note: This chapter is titled "Chopman and the Pink Squad 4" in the English volume release.); 140. "Chop Man and the Pink Squadron 5" (チョップマンとピンク部隊⑤, Choppu Man to Pinku Butai 5) (Note: This chapter is titled "Chopman and the Pink Squad 5" in the English volume release.); 141. "Tomoshige Shigeoka and Noa Hagino" (重岡智茂と萩野乃愛, Shigeoka Tomoshige to Hagino Noa); 142. "Reunion" (再会, Saikai)
16	October 17, 2024	978-4-06-537051-3	February 17, 2026	979-8-88877-525-7 (print); 979-8-89478-879-1 (digital)
143. "We, the Invincible Rangers" (我等戦隊永久不滅, Warera Sentai Eikyū Fumetsu) (Note: This chapter is titled "We Rangers Will Never Die" in the English volume release.); 144. "Lazing About the House" (家でゴロゴロ, Ie de Gorogoro) (Note: This chapter is titled "Lazing Around at Home" in the English volume release.); 145. "Fighter on the Run 1" (戦闘員逃走中①, Sentōin Tōsōchū 1); 146. "Fighter on the Run 2" (戦闘員逃走中②, Sentōin Tōsōchū 2); 147. "Fighter on the Run 3" (戦闘員逃走中③, Sentōin Tōsōchū 3); 148. "Fighter on the Run 4" (戦闘員逃走中④, Sentōin Tōsōchū 4); 149. "Fighter on the Run 5" (戦闘員逃走中⑤, Sentōin Tōsōchū 5); 150. "Fighter on the Run 6" (戦闘員逃走中⑥, Sentōin Tōsōchū 6); 151. "Fighter on the Run 7" (戦闘員逃走中⑦, Sentōin Tōsōchū 7); 152. "Fighter on the Run 8" (戦闘員逃走中⑧, Sentōin Tōsōchū 8)
17	January 17, 2025	978-4-06-538056-7	May 26, 2026	979-8-88877-623-0 (print); 979-8-89830-094-4 (digital)
153. "Fighter on the Run 9" (戦闘員逃走中⑨, Sentōin Tōsōchū 9); 154. "Fighter on the Run 10" (戦闘員逃走中⑩, Sentōin Tōsōchū 10); 155. "A Guest" (お客様, Okyakusama) (Note: This chapter is titled "The Guest" in the English volume release.); 156. "Yellow Rankers" (イエロー位階持ち(ランカー), Ierō Rankā) (Note: This chapter is titled "Yellow Ranker" in the English volume release.); 157. "Inerasable Past" (消せない過去, Kesenai Lako) (Note: This chapter is titled "An Unfading Past" in the English volume release.); 158. "Fire and Ice" (炎と氷, Honō to Kōri); 159. "Those Who Will End It" (終わらせる者達, Owaraseru-mono-tachi) (Note: This chapter is titled "Bringers of the End" in the English volume release.); 160. "Back to Sleep Yet Again" (三度寝, San-do Ne) (Note: This chapter is titled "Third Time Dreaming" in the English volume release.); 161. "What Yellow Is This?" (この黄なんの黄, Kono Kinan no Ki); 162. "Backdoor Route" (裏ルート, Ura Rūto) (Note: This chapter is titled "Back-Alley Deal" in the English volume release.)
18	April 16, 2025	978-4-06-539044-3	August 25, 2026 (digital); September 8, 2026 (print)	979-8-89830-200-9 (digital); 979-8-88877-679-7 (print)
163. "Shinya Kiritani, Age 28" (黄理谷真夜 28歳①, Kiritani Shinya Nijūhachi-sai 1) (Note: This chapter is titled "Shinya Kiritani, Age 28 1" in the English volume release.); 164. "Shinya Kiritani, Age 28 2" (黄理谷真夜 28歳②, Kiritani Shinya Nijūhachi-sai 2); 165. "Shinya Kiritani, Age 28 3" (黄理谷真夜 28歳③, Kiritani Shinya Nijūhachi-sai 3); 166. "Shinya Kiritani, Age 28 4" (黄理谷真夜 28歳④, Kiritani Shinya Nijūhachi-sai 4); 167. "Shinya Kiritani, Age 28 5" (黄理谷真夜 28歳⑤, Kiritani Shinya Nijūhachi-sai 5); 168. "Shinya Kiritani, Age 10" (黄理谷真夜 10歳①, Kiritani Shinya Jū-sai 1) (Note: This chapter is titled "Shinya Kiritani, Age 10 1" in the English volume release.); 169. "Shinya Kiritani, Age 10 2" (黄理谷真夜 10歳②, Kiritani Shinya Jū-sai 2); 170. "Shinya Kiritani, Age 10 3" (黄理谷真夜 10歳③, Kiritani Shinya Jū-sai 3); 171. "Destruction" (崩壊, Hōkai) (Note: This chapter is titled "Breaking Down" in the English volume release.); 172. "The Mega Super Sunday Showdown Begins" (超スーパー日曜決戦開幕, Chō Sūpā Nichiyō Kessen Kaimaku) (Note: This chapter is titled "The Ultra-Super Sunday Showdown Begins" in the English volume release.)
19	August 12, 2025	978-4-06-540002-9	November 24, 2026	979-8-88877-864-7 (print); 979-8-89830-323-5 (digital)
173. "Resurrection" (回生, Kaisei); 174. "Luna, Keith, Age 3" (瑠憂那 騎偉寿 ３歳, Ryūna Kiiju San-sai) (Note: This chapter is titled "Ruuna, Kiisu, Age 3" in the English volume release.); 175. "Affection" (親愛, Shin'ai); 176. "Kanon Hisui, Age 11" (翡翠かのん 11歳, Hisui Kanon Jūichi-sai) (Note: This chapter is titled "Kanon Hisui, Age 11 1" in the English volume release.); 177. "Kanon Hisui, Age 11 2" (翡翠かのん 11歳②, Hisui Kanon Jūichi-sai 2); 178. "The Strongest" (最強, Saikyō); 179. "Foundation" (基軸, Kijiku) (Note: This chapter is titled "Cornerstone" in the English volume release.); 180. "Birds of a Feather" (同類, Dōrui) (Note: This chapter is titled "Alike" in the English volume release.); 181. "Clownery" (道化, Dōke) (Note: This chapter is titled "Clown" in the English volume release.); 182. "Reconstruction" (再構築, Sai Kōchiku)
20	November 17, 2025	978-4-06-541549-8	March 9, 2027	979-8-88877-972-9
183. "Villain" (悪役, Akuyaku); 184. "Target" (標的, Hyōteki); 185. "Mirror Upon Mirror" (共鏡, Kyō Kagami); 186. "Long-Held Dream" (念願, Nengan); 187. "Real Thing" (本物, Honmono); 188. "Distinctions" (区別, Kubetsu); 189. "Firefly's Glow" (蛍火, Hotarubi); 190. "Blind Spot" (死角, Shikaku); 191. "Birth" (誕生, Tanjō); 192. "Yumeko" (夢子)
21	February 17, 2026	978-4-06-542624-1	June 1, 2027	979-8-90074-105-5
193. "Final Showdown" (決勝, Kesshō); 194. "Top Four" (四傑, Yon Ketsu); 195. "Drop Out" (脱落, Datsuraku); 196. "Main Character" (主役, Shuyaku); 197. "Rebirth" (新生, Shinsei); 198. "Trust" (信用, Shinyō); 199. "Creation" (創造, Sōzō); 200. "The Pair" (二人, Futari); 201. "Transform" (変身, Henshin); 202. "Hero" (英雄, Eiyū)
22	May 15, 2026	978-4-06-543312-6	—	—
203. Za Chenjido Riaru Jūnana-sai (千萬の歳月(ザ・チェンジドリアル) 17歳); 204. Za Chenjido Riaru Jūnana-sai 2 (千萬の歳月(ザ・チェンジドリアル) 17歳②); 205. Za Chenjido Riaru Jūnana-sai 3 (千萬の歳月(ザ・チェンジドリアル) 17歳③); 206. Za Chenjido Riaru Jūnana-sai 4 (千萬の歳月(ザ・チェンジドリアル) 17歳④); 207. Tōbatsu (討伐); 208. Kanketsu (完結); 209. Shinsei Sentai Jeneraru Naito (新星戦隊ジェネラルナイト); 210. Kurotō Jiken (黒塔事件); 211. Nichijō to Fantajī (日常とファンタジー); 212. Amanogawa ni Sukuu Ryū (天ノ川に巣食う竜)
23	November 17, 2026	978-4-06-544646-1	—	—
213. Ryūketsu da yo Zenin Shūgō (竜穴だよ全員集合); 214. Shin Shinki to Shin Shingu (新神機と新神具); 215. Hansoku-waza (反則技); 216. Hīrō Sanjō (ヒーロー参上); 217. Ni Kokoro Dōtai (二心同体); 218. Fainaru Raundo (ファイナルラウンド); 219. Shitennō no Tsurayogoshi (四天王の面汚し); 220. Mayoi Tori no Su (迷い鳥の巣); 221. Kenzen na Shinto no Ichinichi (健全な信徒の1日); 222. Fuyūjō Dai Sōhonzan Jūshoku (浮遊城大総本山住職)

=== Chapters not yet in tankōbon format ===
- 223. Dainana no Ko (第七の子)
- 224. Girigiri Uragiri (ギリギリ裏切り)
