= Why Raeliana Ended Up at the Duke's Mansion =

2016 South Korean manhwa

- Volume 1 cover of the webtoon adaptation

그녀가 공작저로 가야 했던 사정 RR: Geunyeoga gongjakjeoro gaya haetdeon sajeong MR: Kŭnyŏga kongjakchŏro kaya haettŏn sajŏng
- Genre: Romance, fantasy, isekai
- Author: Milcha
- Illustrator: Whale
- Publisher: D&C Media (South Korea); Kadokawa Shoten (Japan)
- English publisher: NA: Yen Press
- Webtoon service: KakaoPage (South Korea); Piccoma (Japan); Tappytoon, Tapas (English)
- Original run: September 3, 2017 – March 22, 2021
- Volumes: 9 (as of August 2023)
- Anime television series
- Directed by: Junichi Yamamoto
- Written by: Mitsutaka Hirota
- Music by: Keiji Inai
- Studio: Typhoon Graphics
- Licensed by: Crunchyroll
- Original network: AT-X, Tokyo MX, BS11
- English network: SEA: Animax Asia
- Original run: April 10, 2023 – June 26, 2023
- Episodes: 12

Why Raeliana Ended Up at the Duke's Mansion (Korean: 그녀가 공작저로 가야 했던 사정, Japanese: 彼女が公爵邸に行った理由) is a South Korean web novel written by Milcha. It has been serialized in Kakao's digital comic and fiction platform KakaoPage since September 19, 2016. A webtoon adaptation was first serialized in KakaoPage on September 3, 2017, and is illustrated by Whale. An anime television series adaptation produced by Typhoon Graphics aired from April to June 2023.

== Plot ==
Eunha Park dies in modern day Seoul and gets reincarnated in a novel as a supporting character named Raeliana McMillan who eventually gets killed off during the original story. To avoid her second death, she makes a deal with the male lead Duke Noah Volstaire Wynknight to pretend to be his fiancée in exchange for her silence regarding the whereabouts of the Royal Seal, information she knows from her prior knowledge of the original novel. Will Noah help Raeliana avoid her ill-fated ending, or is history doomed to repeat?

== Characters ==
=== Main ===
Raeliana McMillan (Korean: 레리아나 맥밀런), (Reriana Makumiran (レリアナ・マクミラン)) / Eun-ha Park (Korean: 박은하) / Rinko Hanasaki (花咲凛子, Hanasaki Rinko)
Voiced by: Jang, Mi (Korean); Yume Miyamoto (Japanese); Lindsay Seidel (English)

Noah Volstaire Wynknight (Korean: 노아 벌스테어 윈나이트), (Noa Borusutea Winnaito (ノアボルステア・ウィンナイト))
Voiced by: Kang, Seong-woo (Korean); Yūichirō Umehara (Japanese); Ian Sinclair (English)

Beatrice Tranchett (Korean: 베아트리스 트란쳇), (Beatorisu Toranche (ベアトリス・トランチェ))
Voiced by: Saori Hayami (Japanese); Macy Anne Johnson (English)

=== Supporting ===
Adam Taylor (Korean: 아담 테일러), (Adamu Teirā (アダム・テイラー))
Voiced by: Lee, Kyung-tae (Korean); Shūichirō Umeda (Japanese); Eduardo Vildasol (English)

Keith Westernberg (Korean: 키이스 웨스턴버그), (Kīsu Uesutanbāgu (キース・ウエスタンバーグ))
Voiced by: Jung, Ju-won (Korean); Shun'ichi Toki (Japanese); Lee George (English)

Heika Demint (Korean: 히이카 데민트), (Hīkā Deminto (ヒーカー・デミント))
Voiced by: Akira Ishida (Japanese); Emi Lo (English)

Justin Shamall (Korean: 저스틴 샤말), (Jasutin Shamaru (ジャスティン・シャマル))
Voiced by: Tomokazu Sugita (Japanese); Ivan Jasso (English)

Vivian Shamall (Korean: 비비안 샤말), (Bibian Shamaru (ビビアン・シャマル))
Voiced by: Yumika Yano (Japanese); Monica Rial (English)

Siathrich Newreal Chamos (Korean: 시아트리히 뉴리얼 체이머스), (Shiatorihi Nyūriaru Cheimosu (シアトリヒ・ニューリアル・チェイモス))
Voiced by: Junichi Suwabe

Nick Maddocks (Korean: 닉 매덕스), (Niku Maddukusu (ニック・マダックス))
Voiced by: Hiroki Yasumoto (Japanese); Oscar Seung (English)

=== Others ===
Freese Eriteal
Voiced by: Mirei Kumagai

Gideon Jura
Voiced by: Hiroshi Naka

Ansley
Voiced by: Ami Koshimizu

Francis Brooks
Voiced by: Shin, Yong-woo (Korean); Daisuke Kishio (Japanese)

Jake Langston
Voiced by: Hiroyuki Yoshino

Naomi O'Brian
Voiced by: Arisa Sakuraba

Wade Davis
Voiced by: Nobuhiko Okamoto

Eugene
Voiced by: Minami Takahashi

Rosemary McMillan
Voiced by: Kim, Do-hee (Korean); Tsukino Chikasada (Japanese)

Elma
Voiced by: Hina Natsume

Wheaton
Voiced by: Souma Shiomi

Stephanie Carlisle
Voiced by: Chikako Sugimura

Christine Barkley
Voiced by: Megumi Nakajima

Lady Baylene
Voiced by: Riho Kuma

== Media ==
=== Novel ===
Written by Milcha, the novel began serialization on Kakao's digital comic and fiction platform KakaoPage on September 19, 2016. It composed of 159 chapters and collected in three volumes plus one volume of side stories.

A digital English translation of the novel was published exclusively on the Tappytoon app, under the title The Reason Why Raeliana Ended up at the Duke's Mansion.

==== Volumes ====
No.	Korean release date	Korean ISBN
01	December 28, 2016	979-11-7033-775-1
02	December 28, 2016	979-11-7033-776-8
03	February 28, 2017	979-11-7033-928-1
Side Story	August 17, 2018	979-11-6268-650-8

=== Webtoon ===
A webtoon adaptation, illustrated by Whale, was serialized on KakaoPage on September 3, 2017 to March 22, 2021. It has been collected into nine volumes by D&C Media.

The webtoon is published digitally in English by Tappytoon, in Japan digitally by Piccoma and in print by Kadokawa Shoten. In October 2021, Yen Press announced that they licensed the webtoon for English publication.

==== Volumes ====
No.	Original release date	Original ISBN	English release date	English ISBN
1	July 22, 2019	979-11-973156-8-8	June 28, 2022	978-1-9753-4108-4
2	November 25, 2019	979-11-973156-9-5	November 22, 2022	978-1-9753-4110-7
3	August 12, 2020	979-11-91363-81-4	April 18, 2023	978-1-9753-4112-1
4	January 4, 2021	979-11-973038-1-4	July 18, 2023	978-1-9753-4114-5
5	June 28, 2021	979-11-91363-91-3	November 21, 2023	978-1-9753-6692-6
6	August 30, 2021	979-11-6777-003-5	April 16, 2024	978-1-9753-6695-7
7	January 3, 2022	979-11-6777-016-5	July 23, 2024	978-1-9753-9208-6
8	April 10, 2023	979-11-6777-084-4	November 19, 2024	978-1-9753-9210-9
9	August 2, 2023	979-11-6777-112-4	October 28, 2025	979-8-8554-1991-7

=== Video game ===
A romance video game adaptation was developed by SHIFT UP Corp. and released on May 27, 2021.

=== Anime ===
An anime television series adaptation was announced on July 4, 2022. It is produced by Typhoon Graphics and directed by Junichi Yamamoto, with scripts written by Mitsutaka Hirota, character designs handled by Haruna Hashimoto, and music composed by Keiji Inai. The series aired from April 10 to June 26, 2023, on AT-X and other networks. The opening theme song is "Survive" by MindaRyn, while the ending theme song is "Always and Forever" by Serra. MindaRyn also sang "Fireworks", which served as an insert ending theme song for episode six. Crunchyroll licensed the series outside of Asia, and is streaming it along with an English dub.

==== Episodes ====
No.	Title	Directed by	Written by	Storyboarded by	Original release date
1	"Why Raeliana Made a Deal"; Transliteration: "Kanojo ga Torihiki Shita Riyū" (Japanese: 彼女が取引した理由)	Junichi Yamamoto	Mitsutaka Hirota	Junichi Yamamoto	April 10, 2023
After being pushed to her death by a mysterious figure, Rinko Hanasaki reincarnates in the world of a novel as Raeliana McMillan, a side character destined to be poisoned by her fiancé.
2	"Why Raeliana Made a Contract"; Transliteration: "Kanojo ga Keiyaku Shita Riyū" (Japanese: 彼女が契約した理由)	Hiromichi Matano	Mitsutaka Hirota	Harume Kosaka	April 17, 2023
Raeliana moves to the Wynknight mansion so she and Noah can be officially engaged. She used her knowledge of Noah's possession of the royal seal to convince him to make the deal with her, but Noah seems unfazed, making her wonder if he'll really accept.
3	"Why Raeliana Trained in Domestic Arts"; Transliteration: "Kanojo ga Hanayome Shūgyō Shita Riyū" (Japanese: 彼女が花嫁修業した理由)	Naoki Murata	Yū Murai	Ichizō Kobayashi	April 24, 2023
Raeliana begins her bridal training at the Wynknight mansion. She and Noah must put on the perfect performance to convince society that their engagement is real, but the road ahead of them is clearly rocky...
4	"Why Raeliana Took Up the Fight"; Transliteration: "Kanojo ga Kenka o Katta Riyū" (Japanese: 彼女がケンカを買った理由)	Oyunam	Mitsutaka Hirota	Katsuhiko Nishijima	May 1, 2023
Noah and Raeliana attend a ball. Raeliana attempts to get closer to the wife of Marquess Eriteal at Noah's request, seeking to make him owe her a favor, but then another character from the novel appears: the antagonist Vivian.
5	"Why Raeliana Was Taken Away"; Transliteration: "Kanojo ga Tsuresarareta Riyū" (Japanese: 彼女が連れ去られた理由)	Masaharu Tomoda	Yū Murai	Kazuo Takigawa	May 8, 2023
Raeliana has been kidnapped, and a rescue by Noah and his knights is her best chance. But can they make it in time? And what kind of trap will they find waiting for them if they do?
6	"Why Raeliana Cosplayed"; Transliteration: "Kanojo ga Kosupure Shita Riyū" (Japanese: 彼女がコスプレした理由)	Takahiro Uezono; Junichi Yamamoto	Mitsutaka Hirota	Romanov Higa	May 15, 2023
Raeliana wakes up in Noah's room, with Noah lying half-naked beside her. Panicked, she seeks Adam's help in fleeing the mansion. Noah sends out all his knights to find her, but Raeliana uses a maid disguise to avoid discovery.
7	"Why Raeliana Handed Her a Handkerchief"; Transliteration: "Kanojo ga Hankachi o Watashita Riyū" (Japanese: 彼女がハンカチを渡した理由)	Naoki Murata	Yū Murai	Ichizō Kobayashi	May 22, 2023
Raeliana attends the annual monster hunt in the Sycret Mountains, where each lady traditionally gives a handkerchief to her chosen participant, who in turn gives the lady a monster he's killed. On the first day, Noah makes a request of Raeliana...
8	"Why Raeliana's Going to the Temple"; Transliteration: "Kanojo ga Shinden ni Iku Riyū" (Japanese: 彼女が神殿に行く理由)	Masayuki Iimura; Yoshihiro Ōtsu	Mitsutaka Hirota	Ho Pyeon-Gang	May 29, 2023
Noah and his retinue return from their hunt with a very surprising quarry in tow. Preparations for the lighting of the sacred flame begin, but His Holiness is distracted by other matters. Raeliana's letter to Beatrice finally gets a response.
9	"Why Raeliana Was Called a Barbarian"; Transliteration: "Kanojo ga Yabanjin to Yobareta Riyū" (Japanese: 彼女が野蛮人と呼ばれた理由)	Tadao Ōkubo; Mitsuo Hashimoto	Mitsutaka Hirota	Katsuhiko Nishijima	June 5, 2023
During a break in her purification period, Raeliana encounters His Holiness Heika, and their first meeting quickly devolves into an argument. But this only makes Heika more curious about the girl who spoke so impudently to him...
10	"Why Raeliana Called Him Grandpa"; Transliteration: "Kanojo ga Ojii-chan to Yonda Riyū" (Japanese: 彼女がおじいちゃんと呼んだ理由)	Takahiro Uezono	Yū Murai	Harume Kosaka	June 12, 2023
Heika tries everything he can think of to make Raeliana agree to be his disciple. He opens the seldom-opened gate to the Holy Land and summons its knights to show off his authority, and even tells Raeliana he'll be her grandpa.
11	"Why Raeliana Feigned Ignorance"; Transliteration: "Kanojo ga Shiranai Furi Shita Riyū" (Japanese: 彼女が知らないふりした理由)	Mitsuo Hashimoto	Yū Murai	Ichizō Kobayashi	June 19, 2023
A maid tells Raeliana about a mirror in the west building that promises to give visitors any information they want, and warns her not to go near it. But Raeliana is too curious about what could have happened to Beatrice, the novel's heroine...
12	"Why Raeliana Ended Up at the Duke's Mansion"; Transliteration: "Kanojo ga Kōshaku-tei ni Kita Riyū" (Japanese: 彼女が公爵邸に来た理由)	Nobuhiro Mutō	Mitsutaka Hirota	Ichizō Kobayashi	June 26, 2023
Raeliana continues to wonder what's become of Beatrice. When Raeliana visits a place Beatrice visited in the novel's plot, she meets someone completely unexpected instead, and learns that the status of the royal seal has changed.
