= Watari-kun's ****** Is About to Collapse =

Japanese manga series by Naru Narumi

- First tankōbon volume cover (Kodansha edition)

渡くんの××が崩壊寸前 (Watari-kun no xx ga Hōkaisunzen)
- Genre: Drama; Romantic comedy; Thriller
- Manga
- Written by: Naru Narumi
- Published by: Kadokawa Shoten (2014–2015); Kodansha (2015–2023)
- English publisher: NA: Kodansha USA
- Magazine: Young Ace; (August 4, 2014–June 4, 2015); Monthly Young Magazine; (November 20, 2015–September 20, 2023)
- Original run: August 4, 2014 – September 20, 2023
- Volumes: 16
- Anime television series
- Directed by: Takashi Naoya; Matsuo Asami (assistant)
- Written by: Tatsuya Takahashi (Note: Series composition); Takashi Naoya (Note: Screenplay); Tetsuya Yamada
- Music by: Ken Muramatsu
- Studio: Staple Entertainment
- Licensed by: Crunchyroll
- Original network: Tokyo MX, BS NTV, SUN, tvk, AT-X
- Original run: July 5, 2025 – December 27, 2025
- Episodes: 26
- icon

Watari-kun's ****** Is About to Collapse (Japanese: 渡くんの××が崩壊寸前, Hepburn: Watari-kun no xx ga Hōkaisunzen) is a Japanese manga series written and illustrated by Naru Narumi. It was originally serialized in Kadokawa Shoten's Young Ace magazine from August 2014 to June 2015. The series was later transferred to Kodansha's Monthly Young Magazine where it continued from November 2015 to September 2023. An anime television series adaptation produced by Staple Entertainment aired from July to December 2025.

== Plot ==
Following his parents' death, Naoto Watari has been living with his aunt and his younger sister Suzushiro. Years ago, he was close to his childhood friend Satsuki Tachibana, but after an incident, she suddenly moved away, with him developing resentment towards her. Having been traumatized by that incident, he is surprised when Satsuki returns, transferring to his school. With Satsuki back in his life, Naoto now has to deal with his past traumas, her re-appearance, and his past feelings for her.

== Characters ==
Naoto Watari (渡直人, Watari Naoto)
Voiced by: Shūichirō Umeda (Japanese); Abi Kumar, Nia Celeste (young) (English)
The protagonist of the series. He has been raising his younger sister Suzu ever since the death of their parents, but suddenly finds his peaceful life turned upside down with Satsuki's return.
Satsuki Tachibana (館花紗月, Tachibana Satsuki)
Voiced by: Yumika Yano (Japanese); Sarah Roach (English)
Naoto's childhood friend who suddenly reappears in his life during their high school years. She has an unresolved history with Naoto that makes him want nothing to do with her, though it is revealed that he still cares for her deeply. She later moves away and transfers schools, although she and Naoto reunite when their respective schools have their school trips in Okinawa.
Yukari Ishihara (石原紫, Ishihara Yukari)
Voiced by: Yurie Igoma (Japanese); Kelly Greenshield (English)
Naoto's classmate who has a crush on him, though she now finds competition with Satsuki's return. She later becomes a popular actress.
Makina Umezawa (梅澤真輝奈, Umezawa Makina)
Voiced by: Megu Umezawa
Naoto's junior who is a famous athlete that he knew in middle school.
Shigenobu Tokui (徳井重信, Tokui Shigenobu)
Voiced by: Yoshiki Nakajima (Japanese); Daryl Mayfield (English)
One of Naoto's friends.
Suzushiro Watari (渡鈴白, Watari Suzushiro)
Voiced by: Hinaki Yano (Japanese); Jad Saxton (English)
Naoto's younger sister who dotes heavily on her big brother as much as Nao prioritizes taking care of her.
Tamayo Watari (渡多摩代, Watari Tamayo)
Voiced by: Naomi Ōzora (Japanese); Ariel Graham (English)
The Watari siblings' aunt, who took in the two orphans.

== Media ==
=== Manga ===
Written and illustrated by Naru Narumi, Watari-kun's ****** Is About to Collapse was initially serialized in Kadokawa Shoten's Young Ace magazine from August 4, 2014, to June 4, 2015. It was later transferred to Kodansha's Monthly Young Magazine where it continued from November 20, 2015, to September 20, 2023. The series' chapters were compiled into sixteen tankōbon volumes from February 2015 to November 2023.

During their 2019 Anime NYC panel, Kodansha USA announced that they licensed the manga in digital-only formats.

No.	Original release date	Original ISBN	English release date	English ISBN
1	February 14, 2015 (KS); May 6, 2016 (K)	978-4-04-102797-4 (KS); 978-4-06-382780-4 (K)	December 17, 2019	978-1-64659-146-6
1. "The Day Peace Starts to Fall Apart"; 2. "The Unfathomable Female Mind"; 3. "After-School Committee Activity"; 4. "Eviction"; 5. "A Trivial Lie"
2	June 17, 2016	978-4-06-382809-2	January 28, 2020	978-1-64659-221-0
6. "Priority"; 7. "An Uncomfortably Close Call"; 8. "Memories of the Past"; 9. "Getting Rid of Carnal Desires"; 10. "Showing Off and Being Walked in On"; 11. "A Truth One Can't Bear to Hear"
3	January 6, 2017	978-4-06-382909-9	February 25, 2020	978-1-64659-249-4
12. "Shopping List"; 13. "Ex-Boyfriend"; 14. "You're Not a Normal Girl"; 15. "The Two Who Just Don't Click"; 16. "The Reason She's Gone Missing"; 17. "An Ideal Person"
4	July 6, 2017	978-4-06-510023-3	March 24, 2020	978-1-64659-269-2
18. "That Time..."; 19. "What I Want to Say"; 20. "Inscrutable Feelings"; 21. "Just Childhood Friends"; 22. "The Reply to the Confession"; 23. "The After-School Hours Before Summer Break"
5	January 5, 2018	978-4-06-510701-0	April 28, 2020	978-1-64659-347-7
24. "A Cute Kouhai"; 25. "A Carefree Attitude"; 26. "The Line That Can't Be Crossed"; 27. "The Fireworks Show"; 28. "A Rainy Night"; 29. "Uncontrollable Feelings"
6	September 6, 2018	978-4-06-512808-4	May 26, 2020	978-1-64659-372-9
30. "Lingering Anxiety"; 31. "I Don't Want to Fail at Romance"; 32. "A Girl with a Can-Do Attitude"; 33. "More and More"; 34. "A Mother's Recognition"; 35. "Still Just a Child"
7	March 6, 2019	978-4-06-514805-1	June 23, 2020	978-1-64659-398-9
36. "Naoto's Choice"; 37. "Becoming Independent"; 38. "The Future"; 39. "Do You Actually Love Her?"; 40. "What's Most Important to Me"; 41. "A Test"
8	October 4, 2019	978-4-06-517291-9	July 28, 2020	978-1-64659-606-5
42. "The City Satsuki Grew Up In"; 43. "Satsuki's Home"; 44. "Nao-kun Number Two"; 45. "A Lovely Date in the City"; 46. "Unnoticed Feelings"; Extra chapters: 1. "Yukari Ishihara"; 2. "Satsuki Tachibana"
9	September 4, 2020	978-4-06-520694-2	March 23, 2021	978-1-63699-010-1
10	March 5, 2021	978-4-06-522588-2	September 7, 2021	978-1-63699-343-0
11	August 5, 2021	978-4-06-524343-5	June 14, 2022	978-1-68491-218-6
12	February 18, 2022	978-4-06-526831-5	January 31, 2023	978-1-68491-664-1
13	July 20, 2022	978-4-06-528418-6	April 4, 2023	978-1-68491-882-9
14	January 19, 2023	978-4-06-530414-3	July 11, 2023	979-8-88933-037-0
15	August 18, 2023	978-4-06-532372-4	February 6, 2024	979-8-88933-370-8
16	November 20, 2023	978-4-06-532693-0	April 16, 2024	979-8-88933-441-5

=== Anime ===
An anime adaptation was announced in Monthly Young Magazine on September 20, 2023, which was later confirmed to be a television series produced by Staple Entertainment and directed by Takashi Naoya, with Tatsuya Takahashi handling series composition, Tetsuya Yamada writing scripts alongside Naoya, Matsuo Asami serving as assistant director, and Shōko Yasuda designing the characters and serving as chief animation director alongside Yukiyo Komito, Toshimitsu Kobayashi, and Taeko Ōgi. The series aired from July 5 to December 27, 2025, on Tokyo MX and other networks. (Note: Tokyo MX listed the series premiere on July 4, 2025, at 25:00, which is effectively July 5 at 1:00 a.m. JST.) The first opening theme song is "Yuurei ni Naritai" (ゆうれいになりたい; I Want to be a Ghost), performed by Yuika, while the first ending theme song is "Ai Ai Ai Ai Ai" (愛愛愛愛愛; Love Love Love Love Love), performed by Pedro. The second opening theme song is "Futari-bun" (ふたりぶん), performed by Shallm, while the second ending theme song is "Shippai Shinai Menhera no Sodate-kata" (失敗しないメンヘラの育て方; How to Successfully Raise a Mentally Unstable Person), performed by Yurina Hirate. Crunchyroll is streaming the series.

==== Episodes ====
No.	Title	Directed by	Written by	Storyboarded by	Original release date
1	"The Day Peace Began to Collapse"; Transliteration: "Heion ga Kuzure Hajimeru Hi" (Japanese: 平穏が崩れ始める日)	Matsuo Asami	Tatsuya Takahashi	Takashi Naoya	July 5, 2025
Ever since the death of his parents Naoto Watari has been living with his reclusive aunt Tamayo and looking after his younger sister Suzushiro. At school, he is a member of the Beautification Committee and has a crush on committee member Ishihara. A girl named Satsuki transfers to Naoto's school who was his childhood friend, until the day she destroyed their family garden, for which he never forgave her. Suzushiro asks for a new garden, so Tamayo donates her overgrown one for them to fix. Satsuki offers to help with weeding and when Naoto refuses she suddenly kisses him, witnessed by a furious Tamayo. Ishihara, who has her own crush on Naoto, also sees everything. Satsuki asks if he can forgive her but leaves upset when he asks why she kissed him. Later, with Suzushiro's help, Satsuki gets Naoto to let her help with the garden. Ishihara appears and asks Naoto for help buying supplies for the committee, allowing her to ask him about Satsuki. Naoto assures her they are not dating. Naoto returns home and finds Satsuki already weeded the entire garden. Naoto is grateful, until Satsuki starts stripping off her dirty clothes, causing another misunderstanding with Tamayo who threatens to evict him.
2	"Small Lies"; Transliteration: "Chīsana Uso" (Japanese: 小さなウソ)	Matsuo Asami	Tetsuya Yamada	Takashi Naoya	July 12, 2025
Satsuki offers to let him live with her if he needs to. Tamayo lets him stay as long as he stops fooling around with girls. Ishihara invites Naoto to a study session. When it rains Satsuki offers him her spare umbrella to get home. There he finds Suzushiro got a 100 on her math test and realizes Suzushiro is more capable than she pretends so he will keep treating her like a child. He goes on a walk to think and encounters Satsuki. He walks her home where she asks him to stay but he chooses to leave, even though he now knows he has been using Suzushiro to avoid people. He asks Suzushiro about his study session with Ishihara, but Suzushiro insists she needs help with her homework so he cannot go. Naoto reveals he saw her math test and knows she does not need him. Before they can argue Naoto passes out from a fever. The next day Satsuki sneaks into Naoto's room, feeling guilty he got sick from walking her home. She reveals she got him medicine to feel better, but Naoto is terrified to find they are suppositories. Ishihara also visits to make him lunch, so Satsuki quickly hides under the blanket with Naoto and becomes trapped, unable to move without Ishihara seeing her.
3	"Worldly Desires, Begone"; Transliteration: "Bon'nō Taisan" (Japanese: 煩悩退散)	Matsuo Asami	Tetsuya Yamada	Masayoshi Nishida	July 19, 2025
Despite Ishihara's presence Naoto is so excited lying on Satsuki he orgasms. Ishihara eventually leaves, allowing Naoto to kick Satsuki out. Suzushiro asks Satsuki why she ruined their previous garden and if it was because of the man she saw that day. Satsuki denies there was a man but Suzushiro remembers she almost told Naoto about the man but chose not to so he would stay away from Satsuki and spend more time with her. Ishihara reveals she respects Naoto for caring about his sister when other boys only care about sex. Later, she convinces herself Naoto is too decent to be seduced by Satsuki. She decides to become a braver person so she can tell Naoto her secret. Naoto becomes sleep deprived from avoiding lustful dreams before their exams. Satsuki makes this worse by hinting she has no panties on. Ishihara bravely invites him and Suzushiro to go somewhere fun after their exams. A sudden breeze almost exposes Satsuki, so he grabs her to stop her skirt flying up. Ishihara runs away while Satsuki reveals she is actually wearing Naoto's underwear, so technically she really was not wearing panties. Naoto does terribly on his exams, and Ishihara does not speak to him all week. The class decides to go on a weekend beach trip.
4	"Showing and Been Seen"; Transliteration: "Miseru no Tomi Rareru no" (Japanese: 見せるのと見られるの)	Matsuo Asami	Tatsuya Takahashi	Masayoshi Nishida	July 26, 2025
Naoto learns Suzushiro has her own beach trip at school and insists Naoto pick her swimsuit. Satsuki asks to join them and Naoto is actually grateful for some female input. Ishihara is jealous Naoto is dating Satsuki, but his friend Tokui advises this is only a rumor. Naoto cannot handle Satsuki and Suzushiro's antics so he storms off. Nearby, Ishihara tries on several bikinis hoping to attract Naoto's attention. Satsuki asks why he never told anyone bad things about her. Naoto claims the destroyed garden is private between them. They encounter Ishihara who is convinced by Satsuki she is not dating Naoto. On the trip Naoto notices Satsuki seems upset and she admits she never learned to swim. Naoto is unsure how to respond until Tokui intervenes and sends Naoto on a lunch date with Ishihara. Satsuki claims to Tokui she is not interested in Naoto romantically. Tokui claims the same thing about his feelings for Ishihara, but does not plan to ruin it for Naoto. Naoto compliments Ishihara's bikini and is pleasantly surprised when this makes her happy. Suddenly, they are confronted by Fujioka, a classmate from Ishihara's middle school. The encounter is so sudden that Ishihara returns to their hotel upset. Tokui also learns Fujioka is nearby and immediately worries about Ishihara.
5	"Ideal Partner"; Transliteration: "Risō no Hito" (Japanese: 理想の人)	Matsuo Asami	Takashi Naoya	Takashi Naoya	August 2, 2025
Naoto learns Fujioka was Ishihara's boyfriend who dumped her when they graduated middle school. Fujioka asks Ishihara to restart their relationship. Satsuki is confused when Ishihara claims she never dated Fujioka. Flashbacks show Fujioka did confess to her in middle school, but when she rejected him he started a rumor they were dating that she was always too nervous to deny. Now, she tells Fujioka she likes someone else, then she leaves. Learning everything that happened Tokui sends Naoto to where Ishihara is hiding. Naoto finds Ishihara who explains about never dating Fujioka. She almost confesses to Naoto, but they are interrupted by Fujioka and several classmates. Sensing her fear, Naoto himself explains Ishihara never dated Fujioka. Fujioka insists he and Ishihara are dating but is then shocked when Ishihara insists she never wants to see him again. Fujioka loses his temper, grabs Ishihara and demands she just date him already. Satsuki knocks him down and threatens to call the police, so Fujioka agrees to leave, but only temporarily. Ishihara informs Satsuki she plans to confess to Naoto. Satsuki later confronts Naoto, accusing him of being half-hearted and forgetting why destroying the garden was also partially his fault. She then kisses him and insists either he start acting more honestly or she will destroy something else he loves.
6	"Confession"; Transliteration: "Kokuhaku" (Japanese: 告白)	Ryō Nakamura	Takashi Naoya	Kōji Iwai	August 9, 2025
Naoto remembers before Satsuki destroyed the garden they pretended to run away together. Naoto tells Satsuki what hurt more than her destroying his garden was her disappearing afterwards. Satsuki asks him not to speak to her again. At school Ishihara attempts to confess to Naoto but keeps being interrupted. Tokui finds Satsuki sulking and she admits she wishes she had not met Naoto again. Ishihara is so distracted she starts changing clothes for her club duties in the male locker room, forcing Naoto to hold the door closed so boys cannot see her. Ishihara decides to confess, but the PE teacher suddenly forces the door open, knocking Naoto on top of Ishihara who ends up confessing while Naoto is holding her breasts. Ishihara runs away, leaving Naoto in disbelief. Suzushiro insists Naoto apologize to Satsuki. Satsuki is furious Naoto tries to talk to her. Naoto insists it is unsafe to be living alone without her family. Satsuki insists her family will not care, causing Naoto to admit he cares, because she is his friend. This makes Satsuki happy, so she flashes her panties at him. She also warns him that whatever his answer is, he should not take too long to respond to Ishihara's confession. The next day Naoto meets Ishihara determined to give her his answer.
7	"After School, Just Before Summer Break"; Transliteration: "Natsu Yasumi Mae no Hōkago" (Japanese: 夏休み前の放課後)	Ryō Nakamura	Tetsuya Yamada	Masayoshi Nishida	August 16, 2025
Feeling unworthy, Naoto asks Ishihara for more time before he gives his answer. Ishihara proposes a compromise; they will enter a temporary relationship, and if it does not work, they split up with no hard feelings. Naoto decides to get a part time job at a restaurant but gets in trouble when one of the other candidates, a girl he recognizes from somewhere, mistakes him as a pervert. Ishihara asks Naoto on their first date but he is forced to bring Suzushiro with them as he already promised to take her to the zoo. Suzushiro is unimpressed that Naoto brought a girl with them. Observing from nearby, Tokui and Satsuki are certain a date cannot go well with a little sister tagging along. After lunch while Suzushiro is asleep Naoto promises to take Ishihara on a proper date once he has a job. Suzushiro spots Tokui and Satsuki who admit they were observing to see how badly Naoto messed up his first date. They then take Suzushiro for ice cream, leaving Naoto and Ishihara alone. Despite their nerves they hold hands. Ishihara continues to worry about Satsuki since she already saw her kissing Naoto once before, so she impulsively buys condoms in preparation for the approaching summer break. The girl from Naoto's job interview, Makina, appears at their school, demanding to see him.
8	"A Cute Junior"; Transliteration: "Kawaī Kōhai" (Japanese: かわいい後輩)	Matsuo Asami	Tatsuya Takahashi	Kōji Iwai	August 23, 2025
Naoto remembers they were in the same running club where Makina was a famous middle school athlete. Makina informs Naoto they both got jobs, but because Naoto does not own a phone, the manager could not call him. Makina drags Naoto to buy a phone but becomes upset he has a girlfriend. She returns to her academy where it is revealed she has been struggling lately and risks losing her athletic scholarship. Makina decides to steal Naoto but somehow he is immune to her flirting. She is surprised when the manager praises her work, since no one has praised her for anything recently. She encounters Satsuki who bluntly states her boobs are too small to interest Naoto. Angry, Makina follows Satsuki, dragging Naoto with her, where they find Satsuki now works in the love hotel district. Before they can investigate, they are caught by Makina's team captain. Ishihara invites Naoto to her house over summer so she can cook for him. Still worried, Naoto visits Satsuki but is relieved she actually works at a normal restaurant and the love district is just a useful shortcut. Makina stubbornly invites Naoto to a fireworks festival to prove she has a boyfriend, having lied to her friends about dating him. Naoto refuses and offers to introduce her to Tokui instead. He also flatly refuses to let Makina meet Ishihara.
9	"The Fireworks"; Transliteration: "Hanabi Taikai" (Japanese: 花火大会)	Takuya Sawada	Tatsuya Takahashi	Takashi Naoya	August 30, 2025
Naoto invites Ishihara to the fireworks. Tokui arrives with Makina, but she leaves him to look for Naoto. Ishihara arrives, and Makina is surprised Naoto got such a beautiful girlfriend. At first, she thinks she is jealous of Naoto's happiness but quickly realizes it is because she has actual feelings for him. Ishihara asks Naoto to take her home early but a rainstorm forces them to detour to Naoto's house. There, they encounter Satsuki weather-proofing Suzushiro's plants. Due to the rain Naoto invites them both to spend the night. Before going to sleep Satsuki teases them about kissing. Later, Ishihara sneaks into Naoto's room, planning to kiss him but Naoto mistakes her for Satsuki. This upsets Ishihara that he thought Satsuki was the most likely to sneak into his room instead of her, so she nervously offers to let him "do it". Naoto mistakes this to mean kissing, only to realize what she means when she mentions only just finishing her period so they cannot "go all the way" just yet, only "half way". Unsure of her exact meaning Naoto controls himself and tells Ishihara they should stop if she is not ready. Ishihara leaves upset, certain Naoto thinks she is shameless. Naoto curses himself for doing the right thing. Secretly still awake, Satsuki concludes Naoto is a major idiot.
10	"A Relationship I Don't Want to Mess Up"; Transliteration: "Shippai Shitakunai Ren'ai" (Japanese: 失敗したくない恋愛)	Ryō Nakamura	Tetsuya Yamada	Masayoshi Nishida	September 6, 2025
Satsuki scolds Naoto for his blatant inability to communicate properly with girls, so he texts Ishihara asking to talk. When Makina asks him about taking Ishihara home, he snaps it is none of her business. The manager gives Naoto movie tickets for Suzushiro, and he ends up inviting Makina to apologize for shouting. Ishihara encounters Tokui and shares her fear that Naoto does not like her. Tokui points out if she is feeling insecure then she needs to tell Naoto. Unfortunately, due to being at the movies, Naoto misses all her calls, and it is only later he arranges to meet in person. They end up encountering each other before their arranged meeting, during which Makina asks to borrow Naoto temporarily. Ishihara decides to trust Naoto and agrees. Makina claims there is a boy she likes but is too afraid to approach, so she demands Naoto massage her breasts to make them grow then accuses him of being too cowardly, even with Ishihara. Naoto admits he is constantly trying to avoid upsetting Ishihara, even if it means hiding his feelings. Makina leaves angry, accidentally forgetting her shopping bags. Ishihara overhears this and they end up discussing their feelings honestly for once. Makina frets as she is close to being kicked from her running team and having to transfer schools. Naoto returns her bags and wishes her well with her mystery boy. Makina decides to voluntarily quit her team and pursue Naoto no matter the cost.
11	"Still a Child"; Transliteration: "Mada Mada Kodomo" (Japanese: まだまだ子供)	Matsuo Asami	Takashi Naoya	Takashi Naoya	September 13, 2025
Naoto tells Satsuki he is now dating Ishihara. Satsuki is unconcerned since she will always be Naoto's only childhood friend. Ishihara invites him to her house for lunch. There he meets her mother Mio who admits to being overprotective. Despite this she feels comfortable leaving them alone while she picks up Ishihara's younger brother. Alone, Ishihara admits she is now confident she wants to have sex. Naoto worries but she convinces him it is what she wants. Unfortunately Mio returns early before they can do anything and she sees the condom box. Naoto runs away when she warns him Ishihara is too young. Ishihara becomes upset but Mio insists it would be better if she and Naoto were just friends. Naoto realizes he wants advice from Satsuki, but having run so far he passes out from the heat. He awakens to Satsuki, who claims he told her everything that happened while he was dizzy. She assures him he did nothing wrong and Ishihara was clearly rushing things. She then offers to have sex with him so he knows how to do it properly with Ishihara. Naoto abruptly wakes up, having dreamed the entire conversation. Satsuki, who really was there, explains she found him unconscious in the street apparently having a bad nightmare. Naoto realizes Mio was right; he and Ishihara are still too immature to be having sex.
12	"Being Independent"; Transliteration: "Jiritsu Suru Koto" (Japanese: 自立すること)	Takuya Sawada	Tetsuya Yamada	Kōji Iwai	September 20, 2025
Mio suddenly appears in her car and picks up both Naoto and Satsuki, making Naoto incredibly nervous. Mio reassures him she is not angry as it was obvious that sex was Ishihara's idea. She would prefer if they broke up until they are both adults, but also advises he keep the condoms. Naoto understands her reasons but that night he invites Ishihara on a date. Mio is amused it took him so long. Naoto makes sure their dates are always in public so nothing can happen. Meanwhile, Ishihara remains angry at Mio. Makina continues to yearn form Naoto, who remains oblivious. Naoto plans to get his own apartment with Suzushiro once he graduates high school and starts working, worrying Tamayo. Ishihara also worries he is doing too much. Mio visits Tokui, whom she has known since he was a child, and admits she likes Naoto, despite her parental disapproval. Tokui warns her they might seem weak but there is no way Naoto and Ishihara are going to break up, which Mio accepts is only natural. Naoto begins to struggle with lustful thoughts whilst Ishihara worries seeing her every day is getting in his way. Makina injures her foot and takes advantage by asking Naoto to visit her dorm room.
13	"Do You Really Love Her?"; Transliteration: "Hontō ni Suki na no?" (Japanese: 本当に好きなの？)	Ryō Nakamura	Tatsuya Takahashi	Masayoshi Nishida	September 27, 2025
When Makina learns Mio does not want Naoto dating Ishihara she questions why they are dating, since if Naoto is not willing to fight he must not love Ishihara that much. Naoto realizes Makina was partially right, since all his future plans were for Suzushiro and did not include Ishihara. Satsuki receives a letter from her parents. Ishihara asks to stay the night at his house. Naoto tries to refuse in case it worsens her relationship with Mio, but Ishihara insists. Ishihara overhears Satsuki planning to quit school and return home. She leaves it to Ishihara to either tell Naoto or keep it secret. Naoto visits Mio and talks about her main fear, teenage pregnancy. Since his own parents had him as teenagers, he has no intention of letting it happen to him and Ishihara. Mio agrees they can date as long as they honor Ishihara's nightly curfew and do not have sex. Ishihara tells him Satsuki is leaving and sends him to say goodbye, despite worrying what might happen. Naoto makes it to the train station with barely time to talk, so Satsuki simply pulls him onto the train with her. Naoto is upset she planned to disappear from his life a second time. Naoto realizes even as children he never visited Satsuki's house. Naoto panics when he realizes he left his phone on the train and cannot call Ishihara. Satsuki tries to send him home but he refuses until he has met her parents. Exasperated, Satsuki takes him to her parents house, an inn.
14	"Nao-kun Mk. II"; Transliteration: "Nao-kun Ni'gō" (Japanese: 直くん2号)	Ryō Nakamura	Tatsuya Takahashi	Masayoshi Nishida	October 4, 2025
Satsuki leaves Naoto with inn employee Yayoi who reveals to Naoto that Satsuki's adoptive grandmother died six months previously, and rather than become the new manager Satsuki ran away from her adoptive parents to live in Tokyo. Naoto is shocked to learn Satsuki was recently adopted. Suzushiro remembers the man she saw with Satsuki after destroying their garden was her newly adopted brother. Said brother, Naozumi, arrives at the inn. Satsuki admits she does not feel capable of running the inn successfully. Naoto meets Satsuki's surprisingly fragile parents who reveal they adopted Satsuki to help her mother Sayuki, who had financial problems. They also admit to help with the inn's future they sent Satsuki the letter asking her to marry Naozumi, shocking Naoto at their lack of tact. Naozumi also refuses to marry Satsuki, who he only sees as a sister. Satsuki asks to return to Tokyo to think about her future and her parents agree as long as she starts calling them regularly. Naozumi advises Satsuki if she does secretly love Naoto to steal him from Ishihara by any means. He also wonders if Naoto is the only reason Satsuki moved to Tokyo. Satsuki admits to herself she is in love with Naoto.
15	"What It Means to Love Someone"; Transliteration: "Sukitte Koto" (Japanese: 好きってこと)	Akihiro Nagashima	Tetsuya Yamada	Takashi Naoya	October 11, 2025
Ishihara frets Naoto has not called, so she decides to take a sexy selfie for him. Naoto finally calls, having retrieved his phone. Disappointed Satsuki will be returning to school, Ishihara impulsively decides to take a nude selfie for him, only to accidentally expose herself to her brother Shou. Tokui later talks Ishihara out of the nude photo, which is unsafe for several reasons. Naoto gives her a lover's charm from a shrine, so she takes a photo of them as a couple. Watching nearby, Makina is incredibly frustrated. Satsuki appears and confesses to Naoto in front of Ishihara. Fearing what his response might be, Ishihara takes Satsuki away to talk privately. Satsuki is surprised Ishihara is so insecure but regardless she admits being Naoto's childhood friend is no longer enough for her. Later, Satsuki drags Naoto to a swimming centre, reminding him he promised to teach her to swim. Naoto insists he loves Ishihara and while he is fond of Satsuki as a childhood friend it cannot be more than that. Upset, Satsuki admits she would rather remain friends than have him hate her. At his own swimming lesson, Shou sees them, misunderstands what is happening, and tells Ishihara Naoto is cheating on her. This makes Ishihara more determined.
16	"A Contract for Sex"; Transliteration: "Ecchi no Tame no Keiyaku" (Japanese: エッチのための契約)	Takuya Sawada	Takashi Naoya	Kōji Iwai	October 18, 2025
Ishihara breaks up with Naoto. Satsuki asks Ishihara about it, and she admits her insecurity was making her a horrible person. She told Naoto she was afraid she could not be his girlfriend, but never actually broke up with him. Satsuki tells her not explaining things properly like that is unfair, since Naoto is worried and confused now. Ishihara apologizes to Naoto but again does not explain properly, so Naoto continues to believe they are broken up. Satsuki offers to have sex with him whenever he wants. Tokui explains to Ishihara that Naoto still thinks they are broken up. He also says that if she still feels insecure, she can use the curse of their school festival; anyone who kisses at the after-party will marry within three years. Ishihara decides to delay explaining things to Naoto so it will be more exciting when she finally kisses him at the after-party. Naoto hears a rumor that Ishihara will confess to Tokui at the festival. While shopping for festival supplies Naoto tries to talk to Satsuki but is interrupted by Ishihara and Tokui, making Naoto certain Ishihara likes Tokui. Satsuki invites him to her apartment, but Naoto realizes he cannot just have sex with a friend for no reason, it must be with someone he is dating properly. Satsuki offers to date him but gives him until the festival in two weeks to ask her properly.
17	"Answers for Satsuki and Ishihara-san"; Transliteration: "Satsuki to Ishihara-san e no Henji" (Japanese: 紗月と石原さんへの返事)	Takuya Sawada	Takashi Naoya	Masayoshi Nishida	October 25, 2025
The festival arrives and Naoto overhears Ishihara tell her friends it is him she likes, not Tokui. Ishihara tries to talk to Naoto but they are forced to flee from her obsessed admirers. Ishihara admits despite dating she felt they were growing apart. They almost kiss but are interrupted by her fans who push Naoto violently aside. A teacher intervenes and Ishihara is forced to return to her class while Satsuki takes Naoto to the nurse. With the festival almost over Satsuki demands his answer. Naoto admits he loves her but he is also in love with Ishihara. Satsuki asks if Naoto would be willing to sleep with her whilst dating Ishihara, which he refuses. The after-party begins, so Satsuki quickly kisses him to activate the curse and then leaves. Naoto decides to confess to Ishihara about the kiss after rejecting her confession, causing Ishihara to run away crying. Satsuki begins ignoring him, convincing him their friendship is over. Shou demands Tokui force Naoto to apologize to Ishihara. As Naoto does not answer his phone Suzushiro decides to apologize for him. Shou develops a crush on Suzushiro. Ishihara decides rejecting both her and Satsuki was what was best for Naoto. Tamayo informs Naoto his former landlady is tearing down their old house so she asks him to go save his father's laptop Tamayo is interested in. Naoto has mixed feelings about visiting the house where he and Satsuki first met.
18	"What They're Searching For"; Transliteration: "Sagashi Mono" (Japanese: 捜しもの)	Akihiro Nagashima	Tetsuya Yamada	Masayoshi Nishida	November 1, 2025
Naoto arrives at the house and meets Rika, the landlady's granddaughter. Rika reveals Satsuki was there that morning looking for the laptop. Naoto suspects Satsuki was looking for their childhood photos. Naoto tells Rika everything about Satsuki and Ishihara, claiming he cannot choose between them. Rika suspects he already knows who he wants to be with, but is afriad. Tamayo rings and tells him it is fine if he does not find the laptop as long as no one else has it either as it contains a secret. Rika remembers Naoto's father used to e-mail Tamayo all the time despite not speaking to the rest of his family. Naoto tells Tamayo they probably threw the laptop away, having remembered that Suzushiro broke it, so her emails will remain secret. Satsuki tells Tokui she did not find the photo, but she is determined to move on and asks Tokui to keep Naoto away from her. Tokui informs Naoto Satsuki has transferred schools, and that she and Tokui have started dating. Naoto realizes Rika is right that he was being selfish and relied on Satsuki always being there, even while trying to push her away. Three months later, Naoto decides to find Satsuki and apologize. Rika contacts him to inform him her grandmother found one of his father's USB drives which contains the photo Satsuki wanted. He quickly prints the photo before calling Satsuki's parents; however Yayoi informs him Satsuki has not been living there. Satsuki is shown living in her new school's dormitory.
19	"Seeing Things"; Transliteration: "Maboroshi o Miru" (Japanese: 幻を見る)	Akihiro Nagashima	Tatsuya Takahashi	Masayoshi Nishida	November 8, 2025
Naoto receives Valentine's chocolates from Tamayo and Makina. He is surprised to receive chocolates from Ishihara but she reassures him they are only obligatory. Tokui receives a text from Satsuki and immediately arranges to see Naoto. Tokui admits he was never dating SatsukI; she did not want Naoto trying to find her. He also has no idea where Satsuki is as the text she sent was a request to never contact her again. Ishihara goes shopping with Shimada to prepare for the class trip to Okinawa and admits she wants to make up with Naoto. The class trip arrives in Okinawa where Ishihara realises Satsuki's school is on the same trip. Satsuki confronts Tokui, who admits he figured out which school she transferred to and that their school trip was in Okinawa, but he chose not to tell her or Naoto. Ishihara tries to make sure Naoto does not see Satsuki, but thanks to Tokui's meddling, they end up visiting the same places all day. Satsuki is furious at Tokui, but he insists she and Naoto need to talk. Satsuki almost talks to him, but sees he is with Ishihara and leaves. Naoto suspects he saw Satsuki at the aquarium and tells Ishihara. Ishihara confesses it really was Satsuki, so he abandons Ishihara and rushes to find Satsuki, but she ignores his shouting and leaves with her class.
20	"Now's My Chance"; Transliteration: "Chansu wa Ima" (Japanese: チャンスは今)	Takuya Sawada	Takashi Naoya	Takashi Naoya	November 15, 2025
Naoto gets caught trying to sneak into Satsuki's hotel room and is yelled at by the teachers. He is determined to try again, so Tokui learns Satsuki is faking illness and has moved into a teacher's room, but Ishihara and Shimada successfully lure the teacher away, allowing Naoto inside. Satsuki turns out to be asleep, so he leaves a note telling her he has the photo. Tokui's friend Abe, from Satsuki's school, brings a reply from Satsuki insisting she only wants the photo, but refuses to talk to Naoto. With Abe passing notes, Naoto insists he will only give her the photo in person. As their schools will not be at any of the same places that day, Naoto swaps uniforms with Abe to infiltrate her class. Satsuki is angry to see him, but Naoto convinces her to visit a sunflower field nearby, just like in the photo. Satsuki admits she ruined the peaceful life he had, so she planned not to see him again for his sake. Naoto apologizes for making a mess of everything. She insists she needs more time, but in the future if he is the one that decides to kiss her, she will know he genuinely loves her. She then takes a photo of Naoto with the sunflowers to keep for herself. Naoto is happy he might get to see her again after they return home.
21	"Honest Feelings"; Transliteration: "Sunaona Kimochi" (Japanese: 素直な気持ち)	Akihiro Nagashima	Takashi Naoya	Masayoshi Nishida	November 22, 2025
Naoto arranges to meet Satsuki the next day. Ishihara admits to Shimada she loves Naoto more now they are trying to be just friends. Naoto learns Makina is quitting the restaurant, so he visits her dorm, only to learn from her older sister Makina has been skipping training, so she is being taken out of school to move back home. Upset, Makina asks Naoto to pretend to be her boyfriend for one day. Naoto agrees but is determined not to be late to meet Satsuki. Naoto feels nervous since Satsuki warned him Makina is clearly in love with him. Makina admits that while she was a star in middle school when she got to high school, she met people far better than her, so she made excuses to skip practice and eventually stopped going at all. She tries to ask Naoto to be her boyfriend, but he refuses, explaining he is meeting Satsuki to discuss something important. Makina is upset she failed but accepts his answer. Naoto is late to meet Satsuki and as her dorm has a curfew he walks her back. She explains she will take over her family inn, so she deliberately transferred to a school that offers foreign languages and business qualifications. At the dorm Naoto suddenly tries to kiss her, but Satsuki pulls away due to the dorm's security cameras and says goodnight. Naoto wonders if Satsuki was actually rejecting him.
22	"The One I Need"; Transliteration: "Hitsuyōna Hito" (Japanese: 必要な人)	Takuya Sawada	Takashi Naoya	Kōji Iwai	November 29, 2025
Naoto is surprised everyone has started thinking about careers already. Ishihara suggests going to college, as does Tamayo who offers to pay his tuition if he does more housework. Satsuki visits Naoto, strips to her underwear and asks him to try kissing her again. The suddenness of this makes Naoto suspect something has happened, so he hugs her instead. Satsuki reveals Naozumi is marrying Yayoi and will be running the inn together. She apologises for dodging Naoto's kiss as she was scared to get her hopes up and ruined the moment on purpose. After she leaves Naoto gets on a train to the inn and learns Naozumi is not running the inn, it was Satsuki's mother explaining the situation badly that led Satsuki to assume Naozumi was running the inn. Naoto asks Naozumi's help understanding Satsuki. He reveals Satsuki's biological mother worked at the inn but neglected Satsuki to party with random men and one day just disappeared. Naozumi was put in charge of Satsuki and they decided to visit her old house where Naoto now lived with his parents. Satsuki befriended him but learned once summer ended she would be unable to visit Naoto again. Naoto remembers it was the last day of summer when she destroyed his garden, likely because she was upset at never seeing him again. Understanding Satsuki more now Naoto decides to confess his feelings to her one last time and wait for her answer, even if it takes years.
23	"A Story from Another Time"; Transliteration: "Itsuka no Hanashi" (Japanese: いつかの話)	Chie Yamazaki	Tetsuya Yamada	Chie Yamazaki	December 6, 2025
Tokui meets with Satsuki and admits he is disappointed she and Naoto are still not dating. Satsuki is aware she needs to move on from the past, but demands Tokui stop pressuring her. Ishihara harshly scolds Satsuki, blaming her for getting in between her and Naoto, but also admits their break up was her own fault due to her insecurities and it wouldn't work out between her and Naoto, even if Satsuki wasn't involved. She has decided to move on from Naoto as he and Satsuki are clearly a better match for each other. Satsuki fears she might not be able to give Naoto the love he deserves. In private, Ishihara still has feelings for Naoto. Satsuki surprises Naoto by visiting him at school where he confesses he loves her, wishes to marry and have children one day. After some initial hesitation, Satsuki accepts and they kiss. Despite being a couple they both admit it will be some time before they can see each other again as Naoto has decided to skip college and become a chef, whereas Satsuki is studying to go to college. Three months later, Ishihara has become a model after Shimada convinced her into a beauty pageant, which she won. Tokui has been accepted to a top college and Naoto is working at a European restaurant. After three months apart, Satsuki and Naoto decide to begin living together over summer break.
24	"New Life"; Transliteration: "Atarashī Seikatsu" (Japanese: 新しい生活)	Shigeyasu Yamauchi	Tetsuya Yamada	Shigeyasu Yamauchi	December 13, 2025
Satsuki wants to start having sex. Naoto is reluctant due to worries about pregnancy. Abe later overhears Satsuki tell her friends she missed her period, so he assumes she is pregnant and tells Tokui. Meanwhile, Satsuki is diagnosed with fever. Abe and Tokui talk to Naoto about the possible pregnancy so he rushes home and spends all night looking after her. Naoto wonders why Tokui never dated anyone and Satsuki reveals Tokui is still in love with his ex, a gyaru three years older than him called Aki. They meet with Abe and Tokui at the beach the next day and reveal there was never a pregnancy as they won't be having sex until after graduation. Tokui has been searching for Aki who lives near the beach and admits to Naoto she broke up with him because she was pregnant with her ex's baby. Naoto realises Tokui still isn't over her. They encounter Aki by chance with her daughter and she admits she broke up with her daughter's father and is now engaged to another man. She credits Tokui for seeing everything good about her, giving her confidence to make a better life for herself and her family. Having gained closure Tokui wishes her happiness with her fiancé. Satsuki can't imagine herself as a mother but tells Naoto to invite Suzushiro the next time they go to the beach.
25	"The Shape of a Family"; Transliteration: "Kazoku no Katachi" (Japanese: 家族のカタチ)	Takuya Sawada	Tatsuya Takahashi	Masayoshi Nishida	December 20, 2025
Shimada manipulates Naoto into visiting Ishihara. Ishihara admits there is a kissing scene in her first tv series but she doesn't want it to be her first kiss. Despite knowing he might hate her afterwards, she asks Naoto to be her first kiss as a final goodbye. Naoto refuses but they part on good terms. Naoto and Satsuki attend Yayoi and Naozumi's wedding. Satsuki writes her thoughts down so she knows what to say to congratulate them. Naozumi admits if it weren't for Satsuki and Naoto he wouldn't have had the courage to propose to Yayoi. Yayoi admits she wants children. Naozumi finds Satsuki's letter and shows Naoto a line where she thanks Naoto for always supporting her. Satsuki admits to Yayoi she doesn't think she could marry Naoto as she still can't picture herself as a mother. Naoto overhears this and advises she stay with her parents for a few days but reassures her her feelings on motherhood won't change how he feels about her. Naoto spends time with Suzushiro and Tamayo but worries about Satsuki as Naozumi had revealed Satsuki's feelings come from her lack of relationship with her birth mother. Satsuki returns home and Naoto reveals his own mother had a bad relationship with her family, and according to Tamayo she eloped with his father to escape them. Naoto believes they can be a happy family without children and Satsuki agrees to discuss it again when they are older.
26	"One Last Thing to Make Sure Of"; Transliteration: "Saigo ni Tashikametai Koto" (Japanese: 最後に確かめたいこと)	Matsuo Asami	Takashi Naoya	Takashi Naoya	December 27, 2025
Makina visits Naoto and reveals she managed to stay in school and is considering becoming a coach. Ishihara and Shimada also visit Naoto, having finished Ishihara's television series. Shimada reveals the whole kissing scene was a prank to try get Naoto to kiss her, as the scene was actually a dog licking Ishihara's face, much to Ishiahara's embarrassment, as she wanted to surprise Naoto. Naoto's boss inspires him to focus on his career if he is serious about marrying Satsuki one day, so Naoto decides to earn his Chef License. Satsuki spends an afternoon with Suzushiro and Tamayo ends up joining them to advise Satsuki on careers; as she can't choose between her parents' inn or getting a job elsewhere. Tamayo, who is about to return to work as a lawyer after taking extended leave to look after Naoto and Suzushiro, offers to keep looking after Suzushiro if Naoto and Satsuki decide to keep living together. Naoto thanks her for looking after them for so long. Naoto invites Satsuki and Suzushiro to the beach like Satsuki wanted. There, Naoto gives her a watch and asks if they can live together again once they graduate in a few months, with the eventual goal of getting married. Satsuki accepts his semi-proposal and confesses she loves him, which she had not said out loud before.

== See also ==
- Ms. Koizumi Loves Ramen Noodles, another manga series with the same author
