= Yumika Yano =

Japanese voice actress

- 矢野 優美華
- Born: February 19; Tokyo, Japan
- Occupation: Voice actress
- Years active: 2018–present
- Agent: Yu-Rin Pro
- Notable work: Go! Go! Loser Ranger! as Yumeko Suzukiri; Watari-kun's ****** Is About to Collapse as Satsuki Tachibana

Yumika Yano (矢野 優美華, Yano Yumika; born February 19) is a Japanese voice actress who is affiliated with Yu-Rin Pro. She started her career in 2018, and in 2024 she played her first main role as Yumeko Suzukiri in the anime television series Go! Go! Loser Ranger!. She is also known for her roles as Vivian Shamall in Why Raeliana Ended Up at the Duke's Mansion and Satsuki Tachibana in Watari-kun's ****** Is About to Collapse.

== Career ==
Yano's interest in voice acting began when she was in junior high school, having been influenced by her anime-loving friends as well as visits to specialized anime stores such as Animate. Finding it interesting that voice actors often performed jobs outside of voice acting, such as hosting radio programs and having music careers, she decided to become one herself. Her interest strengthened in high school when she learned that enrolling in a training school would make her more likely to become a voice actor.

After enrolling in a training school, Yano took lessons for six years before she became affiliated with an agency. Her first voice acting role was in a mobile game, while her first anime work was in the television series Hanebado!, where she performed multiple background and supporting roles. In 2023, she played Vivian Shamall in the anime series Why Raeliana Ended Up at the Duke's Mansion. In 2024, she played her first main role as Yumeko Suzukiri in the anime series Go! Go! Loser Ranger!. In 2025, she voiced Satsuki Tachibana in Watari-kun's ****** Is About to Collapse.

== Filmography ==
=== Anime ===
| Year | Title | Role | Other notes |
|---|---|---|---|
| 2018 | Hanebado! | | |
| 2023 | Why Raeliana Ended Up at the Duke's Mansion | Vivian Shamall | |
| 2024 | Go! Go! Loser Ranger! | Yumeko Suzukiri | |
| 2025 | Watari-kun's ****** Is About to Collapse | Satsuki Tachibana | |
| 2026 | The 100 Girlfriends Who Really, Really, Really, Really, Really Love You | Kishika Torotoro | Season 3 |
