= Go! Go! Loser Ranger! =

Japanese manga series by Negi Haruba

- First tankōbon volume cover, featuring Red Keeper

戦隊大失格 (Sentai Daishikkaku)
- Genre: Action; Comedy; Superhero
- Manga
- Written by: Negi Haruba
- Published by: Kodansha
- English publisher: NA: Kodansha USA
- Imprint: Shōnen Magazine Comics
- Magazine: Weekly Shōnen Magazine
- Original run: February 3, 2021 – present
- Volumes: 23
- Anime television series
- Directed by: Keiichi Sato
- Written by: Keiichirō Ōchi
- Storyboarded by: Keiichi Sato
- Music by: Yoshihiro Ike
- Studio: Yostar Pictures
- Licensed by: Disney Platform Distribution
- Original network: JNN (TBS & CBC), BS11, AT-X (S1–S2)
- Original run: April 7, 2024 – June 29, 2025
- Episodes: 24
- icon

Go! Go! Loser Ranger! (Note: Japanese: 戦隊大失格, Hepburn: Sentai Daishikkaku; lit. Sentai Great Disqualification), also known as Ranger Reject, is a Japanese manga series written and illustrated by Negi Haruba. It has been serialized in Kodansha's Weekly Shōnen Magazine since February 2021, with its chapters collected in twenty-three tankōbon volumes as of November 2026. An anime television series adaptation produced by Yostar Pictures aired from April to June 2024. A second season aired from April to June 2025.

== Plot ==
Thirteen years ago, the Villainous Army of Evil attempted to invade Earth, faced by the Super Sentai squadron known as the Divine Dragon Rangers (竜神戦隊ドラゴンキーパー, Ryūjin Sentai Doragon Kīpā; lit. 'Dragon God Squadron Dragon Keeper'), also known as the Dragon Keepers, and their super weapons, the Divine Tools. The evil army, however, was defeated within a year, all of its Executives wiped out, and the surviving (and almost immortal) foot soldiers have been forced ever since to reenact their defeat to the Keepers in front of a crowd of spectators every Sunday. Tired of the charade, and realizing that this amounts to little more than slavery, one of the foot soldiers rebels and decides he will defeat the Dragon Keepers by infiltrating the organization.

== Characters ==
=== Main ===
Footsoldier D (戦闘員D, Sentōin D)
Voiced by: Yūsuke Kobayashi (Japanese); Zeno Robinson (English)
A rebellious foot soldier from the villainous army in the sky fortress that arrived 13 years ago, he is a Duster with transformative and regeneration abilities alongside his fellow foot soldiers who vowed to defeat the Dragon Keepers by infiltrating their organization and ranks. He takes on two disguises for most of the series; one is an appearance of an average black haired teenage guy, and the other as Hibiki so he can use his identity to infiltrate their ranks easier.
Hibiki Sakurama (桜間 日々輝, Sakurama Hibiki)
Voiced by: Daishi Kajita, Tenma Takeshita (young) (Japanese); Paul Castro Jr., William Luke (young; episode 4), Bryan Chao (young; episode 11), Charlie Carroccio (young; season 2) (English)
An inspiring independent Ranger cadet who is aware of the Dragon Keepers' corruption but wishes to fix their system by bringing them back to their original sense of justice. Following an attack to cover D, he swaps places with him after becoming disfigured while D carries on using his identity for most of the series. His current whereabouts remain unknown.
Yumeko Suzukiri (錫切 夢子, Suzukiri Yumeko)
Voiced by: Yumika Yano (Japanese); Heather Gonzalez (English)
A Junior First-Class ranked Ranger from the Yellow Battalion, who has a mysterious grudge against the Dragon Keepers. She and D made an alliance together to collect their Divine Tools and plans to kill them, though her background and motives remains unknown.

=== Dragon Keepers ===
The Dragon Keepers team

The Dragon Keepers organization comprises the five "First Class" Dragon Keepers and those under their command. Each Keeper has their own battalion with distinct responsibilities within the organization, and each member has a different rank determined by their respective Keeper. The First Class Keepers also possess the Divine Tools that have the power to permanently kill members of the Villainous Army, although lower-ranking members can be assigned replicas or other weapons with similar power.

==== First Class ====
Sosei Akabane (赤刎 創星, Akabane Sōsei) / Red Keeper (レッドキーパー, Reddo Kīpā)
Voiced by: Yuichi Nakamura (Japanese); Jonah Scott (English)
The leader of the Dragon Keepers and commander of the Red Battalion. Despite appearing friendly and inspiring, he possesses an extremely violent nature that he will not hesitate to use on those that anger him, including his own subordinates.
Shougo Aoshima (靑嶋 庄吾, Aoshima Shōgo) / Blue Keeper (ブルー キーパー, Burū Kīpā)
Voiced by: Go Inoue (Japanese); Alain Mesa (English)
The Blue Keeper and commander of the Blue Battalion, and the only member with visible scars on his face. Originally in a gang to raise money for an orphanage, he joined the Rangers after Akabane blackmails him while in jail. He is killed by Peltrola's sneak attack while he is fighting D.
Shinya Kiritani (黄理谷 真夜, Kiritani Shinya) / Yellow Keeper (イエロー キーパー, Ierō Kīpā)
Voiced by: Kensho Ono (Japanese); Dino Andrade (English)
The Yellow Keeper and commander of the Yellow Battalion. He is often seen smiling constantly.
Chidori (千鳥) / Green Keeper (グリーンキーパー, Gurīn Kīpā)
Voiced by: Kohsuke Toriumi (Japanese); Michael Sinterniklaas (English)
The Green Keeper and commander of the Green Battalion. He is the only member of the team to have his entire face covered and is almost always silent.
Sesera Sakurama (桜間 世々良, Sakurama Sesera) / Pink Keeper (ピンクキーパー, Pinku Kīpā)
Voiced by: M.A.O (Japanese); Cherami Leigh, Cassie Glow (young) (English)
The Pink Keeper and commander of the Pink Battalion and Hibiki's older sister. She is obsessed with keeping Hibiki safe. When un-transformed, it is revealed she is crippled after getting caught up in Peltrola's battle and has to rely on a wheelchair. She is struck down by Hwalipon during a war with his monsters.
Keisuke Souma (相馬 圭介, Sōma Keisuke) / Blue Keeper (ブルー キーパー, Burū Kīpā)
Voiced by: Shō Karino (Japanese); Matthew Yang King (English)
The original Blue Keeper who stepped down from the role when Shougo Aoshima was chosen, but returned upon the latter's death.
Noa Hagino (萩野 ノア, Hagino Noa) / Pink Keeper (ピンクキーパー, Pinku Kīpā)
Voiced by: Tomomi Jiena Sumi (Japanese); Anjali Kunapaneni (English)
The second Pink Keeper who previously held the rank of Third Class before taking up the mantle of Pink Keeper following Sesera's fall.

==== Red Battalion ====
Shun Tokita (朱鷺田 隼, Tokita Shun)
Voiced by: Hiroyuki Yoshino (Japanese); Todd Haberkorn, Lenn Faynboym (young) (English)
The current second-in-command of the Red Battalion who formerly held the position of Third Class.
Kai Shion (獅音 海, Shion Kai)
Voiced by: Yūki Ono (Japanese); Sunil Malhotra (English)
A former colorless cadet who originally joined to seek revenge on the boss monsters for the death of his brother and to get the truth of why their existence was hidden by the Ranger Academy, feeling betrayed by them in their corruption. He transferred over to the Red Battalion due to his actions in fighting Peltrola in the first year, even though he failed the test; the Rangers were impressed by his skill.
Funga Baraki (薔薇木 噴牙, Baraki Funga)
Voiced by: Robert Waterman (Japanese); Eric Braa (English)
A member of the Red Battalion with the rank of Junior Third Class. In spite of his intimidating lion-like appearance, he shows himself to be quite compassionate and considerate of his fellow cadets.
Jin Himura (緋村 仁, Himura Jin)
Voiced by: Naoya Miyase (Japanese); Aleks Le (English)
The first former second-in-command of the Red Battalion with the rank of Junior First Class. Despite appearing polite and civil, he has ambitions of replacing Akabane as Red Keeper. After Akabane gets outsmarted by D at one point, Jin loses faith in his leader and demands that he hand over the role of Red Keeper to him, only to get beaten to death by his former idol.
Dairyu Azuki (小豆 大粒, Azuki Dairyū)
Voiced by: Genki Muro^{Ep. 12 credits} (Japanese); Benjamin Diskin (English)
The second second-in-command of the Red Battalion after Jin's death to serve under Akabane. Unlike Jin, Dairyu is far more reserved and withdrawn. During a meeting between the Dragon Keepers and their second-in-commands, Dairyu accidentally spills tea on Akabane after tripping on himself. Akabane then promptly beats him to death like he did his previous second-in-command.
Yamato Beni (紅倭, Beni Yamato)
Voiced by: Masayuki Akasaka (Japanese); Nicholas Thurkettle (English)
A member of the Red Battalion with the rank of Second Class, serving as a rival to Tokita. He is killed by monsters when investigating a zoo.
Shochiku Umezawa (梅沢松竹, Umezawa Shōchiku)
Voiced by: Yuto Mimura (Japanese); Jon Allen (English)
The third second-in-command of the Red Battalion after Dairyu's death to serve under Akabane. At some point, he is murdered by the Executive Hwailipon, who then wears his skin to infiltrate the Dragon Keepers and keep an eye on their activities.

==== Blue Battalion ====
Komachi Aizome (藍染 小町, Aizome Komachi)
Voiced by: Rika Nagae (Japanese); Michelle Marie (English)
The second-in-command of the Blue Battalion, first serving under Keisuke Souma until he stepped down and then serving Shougo Aoshima when he took over, forming a deep bond with the latter. Formerly cheerful and light-hearted, she becomes cold-hearted and obsessed with getting revenge for Aoshima's death, treating Souma with indifference when he takes over again.
Eigen Urabe (浦部 永玄, Urabe Eigen)
Voiced by: Seiichiro Yamashita (Japanese); Eric Vale (English)
A former colorless cadet who gets inducted into the Blue Battalion for his actions against Peltrola despite failing the entrance test. He once shared the dream of becoming Rangers together with Koguma, and continues on for his sake after the latter falls into a coma due to his injuries in fighting Peltrola. He is very protective of his younger siblings who look up to him and convinces the Fighters in the floating fortress to aid him fighting the Death Messiah.
Kujaku (孔雀)
Voiced by: Nina Tamaki (Japanese); Alyson Leigh Rosenfeld (English)
A lower-rank member of the Blue Battalion.
Konno (今野)
Voiced by: Junichi Saito (Japanese); Marc Swint (English)
A second class member of the Blue Battalion under Aizome who also looked up to Aoshima and is devastated by his death.
Aran Hekiru (碧流 亜乱, Hekiru Aran)
Voiced by: Kensho Ono (Japanese); Benjamin Diskin (English)
A member of the Blue Battalion with the rank of Junior Third Class. Known for his emotional instability, he is shown having a severe weakness complex and cares too much about what others think of him.
Sorakaze (空風)
Voiced by: Shōya Ishige^{Ep. 21 credits} (Japanese); Howard Wang (English)
A lower class member of the Blue Battalion known for his recklessness.

==== Green Battalion ====
Kanon Hisui (翡翠 かのん, Hisui Kanon)
Voiced by: Azumi Waki (Japanese); Jessica DiCicco, Vivienne Rutherford (young) (English)
The second-in-command of the Green Battalion under Chidori. Hisui lost her family to the monster invaders as a child and harbors a great deal of vitriol against them. It was only after climbing the ranks of the Rangers that she became more open-minded and chose to fight for justice instead of revenge. Similar to Chidori, she is aware of the corruption in the Ranger organization.
Angel Usukubo (薄久保 天使, Usukubo Enjeru)
Voiced by: Shiori Mikami (Japanese); Stephanie Sheh, Lillian Lo (young) (English)
A former colorless cadet who passes the entrance test and joins the Green Battalion. She is secretly a member of the Invader Rights Association who infiltrated the Rangers under her father's orders. However, after discovering the group's true plans, she breaks away and sides fully with the Rangers.
Kanade Tokiwa (常盤 奏, Tokiwa Kanade)
Voiced by: Shizuka Ishigami (Japanese); Laci Morgan (English)
The original second-in-command of the Green Battalion under Chidori. Kanade used to be rivals with Hisui, often sparring whenever they could, but they held respect for one another. Kanade was killed by her fellow Green Battalion member Kyosuke Wakaba, who betrayed them and took the side of the Executive Magatia.

==== Yellow Battalion ====
Akane Yamabuki (山吹 茜, Yamabuki Akane)
Voiced by: Akiho Suzumoto (Japanese); Caitlyn Elizabeth (English)
The second-in-command of the Yellow Battalion under Shinya Kiritani. She is known for her analytical mind and genius, helping her leader invent new things.
Angelica Yukino (雪野 アンジェリカ, Yukino Anjerika)
Voiced by: Akari Kitō (Japanese); Erica Lindbeck (English)
A former colorless cadet who passes the entrance exam. She initially joins the Blue Battalion before transferring to the Yellow Battalion after discovering her smarts are better suited for science and analyzation.
Nagisa Chabatake (茶畑 渚, Chabatake Nagisa)
Voiced by: Junpei Baba^{Ep. 21 credits} (Japanese); Jon Allen (English)
A member of the Yellow Battalion under Shinya Kiritani with the rank of Third Class. Known for his curiosity, he ends up getting into trouble with the Invader Rights Association where Shinya ends up sacrificing him to defeat an enemy he gets entangled with.

==== Pink Battalion ====
Masurao Nadeshiko (撫子 益荒男, Nadeshiko Masurao)
Voiced by: Fumihiko Tachiki (Japanese); Jamieson Price (English)
The second-in-command of the Pink Battalion under Sesera until her fall during the fight with Hwalipon, now serving under Noa Hagino after she takes up the mantle. In spite of his Bara-like appearance and imposing visage, he is actually quite gentlemanly, except for battle where he can cut loose. He is devastated after Seresa's fall.

==== Colorless Rangers ====
The "Colorless" refer to the lowest-ranking members of the Keeper hierarchy, and are often looked down upon by those higher up the ranks.

Soujirou Ishikawa (石川 宗次郎, Ishikawa Sōjirō)
Voiced by: Daiki Hamano (Japanese); Andrew Kishino (English)
The oldest of the colorless cadets who once held the Keepers in high regards. He is killed by Peltrola during the monster's reveal in the final exams to become Rangers, sacrificing his life to ensure his friends succeed.
Renren Akebayashi (明林 恋蓮, Akebayashi Renren)
Voiced by: Tomoyo Kurosawa (Japanese); Cassandra Lee Morris (English)
The only female left of the colorless cadets. Even after failing the first test, she remains where she is in an attempt to become a full cadet eventually. She and Shippou become close after the first year.
Yamato Kurusu (来栖 大和, Kurusu Yamato)
Voiced by: Ryōta Ōsaka (Japanese); Alan Lee (English)
A member of the colorless cadets who originally joined in order to become popular with the ladies. After the first year, he becomes close with all his fellow cadets and now seeks to fight for real justice.
Tsukasa Shippou (七宝 司, Shippō Tsukasa)
Voiced by: Masanori Shimizu (Japanese); Patrick Seitz (English)
The strongest physically of the colorless cadets. Though he passes his test, he chooses to stay behind to help his fellow low level cadets, becoming particularly close with Akebayashi in the process.
Ranmaru Koguma (小熊 蘭丸, Koguma Ranmaru)
Voiced by: Yukihiro Nozuyama (Japanese); Luis Bermudez (English)
The shortest of the colorless cadets who is childhood friends with Urabe, both with dreams of joining the Keepers. He is the first to discover D's identity when he is in disguise as Hibiki, the Duster having trusted him enough to reveal his secret. He is nearly killed by Petrola when the monster reveals himself in the Blue Garrison, but survives and is left in a coma for a time; reawakening after the fall of the Invader Rights Association.

==== Others ====
Draggie-kun (リュージン君, Ryūjin-kun)
Voiced by: Masako Nozawa (Japanese); Dino Andrade (English)
The mascot of the Dragon Keepers.
Kyosuke Wakaba (若葉 京介, Wakaba Kyōsuke)
Voiced by: Yuki Kaji (Japanese); Griffin Puatu (English)
A former member of the Green Battalion, who led Ouroboros with the Executive Magatia. He betrayed and murdered the second-in-command Kanade Tokiwa out of jealousy for her Divine Artifact and out of disillusionment with the world around him, preferring to live in the fantasy Magatia gave him. He is ultimately killed by Hisui, avenging Kanade and the lives of the other Green Battalion he murdered.
Mine Gatou (我藤 嶺, Gatō Mine)
Voiced by: Hiroshi Shirokuma (Japanese); Evan Michael Lee (English)
A former soldier who fought in war that became disillusioned with the undeserved deaths of children, swayed into joining Magatia under the false promise of creating a more perfect world without strife and made to operate in the abandoned school as a teacher.
Yuu Nishiki (西木 有, Nishiki Yū)
Voiced by: Akira Ishida (Japanese); Stephen Fu (English)
A young teen who was spirited away and killed by Magatia to be made into his human vessel for the purpose of hiding his presence in the abandoned school.
Masashi Nishiki (西木 正志, Nishiki Masashi)
Voiced by: Masakazu Morita (Japanese); John Patneaude (English)
A detective of the Metropolitan Police Department and the older brother of Yuu who seeks to learn the truth of his younger brother's disappearance, inadvertently getting involved in the fight against the boss monsters in the process.
Shigenobu Murakami (村上 重信, Murakami Shigenobu)
Voiced by: Satoru Ito (Japanese); Keone Young (English)
A detective from the Metropolitan Police Department. He and Nishiki are investigating the spirited away cases of young students in the Amanogawa City.
Yakushi Usukubo (薄久保 薬師, Usukubo Yakushi)
Voiced by: Hiroshi Kamiya (Japanese); Howard Wang (English)
The chairman of Invader Rights Association board and the father of Angel Usukubo.
Yulimerida (ユリメリダ, Yurimerida)
Voiced by: Risa Shimizu (Japanese); Victoria Grace (English)
A former Executive who was banished for being too passive. Unlike many of her peers, she did not see the Fighters as pawns and actually sought coexistence with humans, becoming the first boss monster to gain the power to shift into a human form instead of stealing a human's body. At some point after her banishment, she met and fell in love with Yakushi while she was in her human form. Through their union, she gave birth to their daughter Angel. She was later killed, leaving both her lover and daughter distraught.
Kaede Ukyo (右京 楓, Ukyō Kaede)
Voiced by: Mana Nakatomi (Japanese); Melissa Medina (English)
A journalist and a board member of the Invader Rights Association. She injects herself with the DNA of the boss monster Andrega, gaining his powers and part of his appearance. She is killed during the raid on the association's headquarters.
Juji Sazan (左山 十字, Sazan Jūji)
Voiced by: Tatsuya Koizumi (Japanese); Caleb Yen (English)
A devout monster supporter and one of the board members of the Invader Rights Association who was once a bullied high school student. He injects himself with the DNA of Magatia, allowing the boss monster to resurrect through him as a vessel only to end up losing once more to the Dragon Keepers.
Inko Tachibana (立花 音呼, Tachibana Inko)
Voiced by: Chiko Mizumori (Japanese); Stephanie Komure (English)
The owner of the Amanogawa Central Wildlife Park and one of the board members of the Invader Rights Association. She injects herself with the DNA of the boss monster Todomask, becoming his vessel and allowing him to come back in her body only for both to be killed by Green Keeper, who had killed Todomask prior.
Daisuke Daidai (橙代 大介, Daidai Daisuke)
Voiced by: Kazuho Nagasaki (Japanese); Christopher Sabat (English)
A former Second Class cadet for the Yellow Battalion who retired and joined the Invader Rights Association as a board member. He is killed by Red Keeper when he tried infiltrate their headquarters.
Kiisu (騎偉寿, Kīsu)
Voiced by: Kentarō Mashiro (Japanese); Sean Burgos (English)
A former Executive, once named Chakobul, who was exiled from the Villainous army for being "different". After meeting up with fellow exiled Executive Ruuna, both became lovers and even gained the power to combine. Unlike many of his fellow boss monsters, he never saw the footsoldiers as cannon fodder and even felt sympathy towards them. Now he and Ruuna work to stand against both the other Executives and other corrupt individuals in the world.
Ruuna (瑠憂那, Rūna)
Voiced by: Rika Abe (Japanese); Courtney Lin (English)
A former Executive, once named Yakekokab, who was exiled from the Villainous army for being "different". After meeting up with fellow exiled Executive Kiisu, both became lovers and even gained the power to combine. Unlike many of her fellow boss monsters, she never saw the footsoldiers as cannon fodder and even felt sympathy towards them. Now she and Kiisu work to stand against both the other Executives and other corrupt individuals in the world.

=== Villainous Army ===
==== Executives ====
Peltrola (ペルトロラ, Perutorora)
Voiced by: Hōchū Ōtsuka (Japanese); Adam Sietz (English)
A surviving Executive of the Villainous Army who resides in the Blue Garrison yet eventually escapes with the aid of XX who had been serving him in secret. He kills the Blue Keeper while the latter was preoccupied in a fight against D and now seeks revenge on the Dragon Keepers.
Hwalipon (フワリポン, Fuwaripon)
Voiced by: Kōji Yusa (Japanese); John Patneaude (English)
A surviving Executive of the Villainous Army who lives in disguise while working with the Invader Rights Association, being well known by the world for his livestreams, where he would call out the truth behind the Rangers.
Magatia (マガティア)
Voiced by: Akira Ishida (Japanese); Stephen Fu (English)
A surviving Executive of the Villainous Army who resides in a school by trapping it in a loop. After his loop is thwarted through the efforts of D, he killed by Green Keeper. He is then revived by the Invader Rights Association who acquired his DNA which member Juji injects himself with, becoming a host for the Executive.
Andrega (アンデレガ, Anderega)
Voiced by: Takaaki Torashima^{Ep. 22 credits} (Japanese); Derek Stephen Prince (English)
A deceased Executive, killed by Blue Keeper in the past, but his DNA was seized by the Invader Rights Association in an attempt to revive him when member Kaede Ukyo injects it into herself.
Todomask (トドマスク, Todomasuku)
Voiced by: Shinichirō Ōta^{Ep. 22 credits} (Japanese); Doug Stone (English)
A deceased Executive, killed by Green Keeper in the past, but his DNA was acquired by the Invader Rights Association. He is revived by member Inko Tachibana who injects his DNA into herself, becoming his host, only to be killed by Green Keeper once more.

==== Dusters ====
Footsoldier A (戦せん闘とう員 A, Sentōin A)
Voiced by: Haruki Ishiya (Japanese); Colby Rummell (English)
A loyal footsoldier who stayed in the fortress, submitting to the Dragon Keepers. He was the de facto representative and lead of the footsoldiers and would take the lead during the Sunday Showdowns, apologizing for his comrades whenever they would act up against the Dragon Keepers in order to save their skins. He often appraised the fake boss monsters and would lead the charge during each Sunday. In the end, he is inspired by D and Urabe to stand up to the Executives for their oppression.
Footsoldier B (戦せん闘とう員 B, Sentōin B)
Voiced by: Genki Muro^{Ep. 1 credits} (Japanese); Benjamin Diskin (English)
A loyal footsoldier who stayed in the fortress, submitting to the Dragon Keepers. After spending so much time in the fortress being forced to serve the Dragon Keepers, he eventually is inspired by D and Urabe to stand up to the Executives for their oppression.
Footsoldier C (戦せん闘とう員 C, Sentōin C)
Voiced by: Takaaki Torashima (Japanese); Jack DeSena (English)
A loyal footsoldier who stayed in the fortress, submitting to the Dragon Keepers. After spending so much time in the fortress being forced to serve the Dragon Keepers, he eventually is inspired by D and Urabe to stand up to the Executives for their oppression.
Footsoldier F (戦せん闘とう員 F, Sentōin F)
Voiced by: Taito Ban (Japanese); Daniel Walton (English)
A loyal footsoldier who stayed in the fortress, submitting to the Dragon Keepers. He was D's first true friend and leaves the fortress to find him when he leaves to infiltrate the Dragon Keepers, only to end up being caught by them and executed by Red Keeper. His death heavily affects D.
Footsoldier G (戦せん闘とう員 G, Sentōin G)
Voiced by: Jin Ogasawara (Japanese); Parker Simmons (English)
A loyal footsoldier who stayed in the fortress, submitting to the Dragon Keepers. After spending so much time in the fortress being forced to serve the Dragon Keepers, he eventually is inspired by D and Urabe to stand up to the Executives for their oppression.
Footsoldier H (戦せん闘とう員 H, Sentōin H)
Voiced by: Takeru Yagi^{Ep. 1 credits}
A loyal footsoldier who stayed in the fortress, submitting to the Dragon Keepers. After spending so much time in the fortress being forced to serve the Dragon Keepers, he eventually is inspired by D and Urabe to stand up to the Executives for their oppression.
Footsoldier L (戦せん闘とう員 L, Sentōin L)
Voiced by: Ayumi Mano (Japanese); Ellie Dritch (English)
A loyal footsoldier who stayed in the fortress, submitting to the Dragon Keepers. She is one of the only known female footsoldiers. After spending so much time in the fortress being forced to serve the Dragon Keepers, she eventually is inspired by D and Urabe to stand up to the Executives for their oppression.
Footsoldier N (戦せん闘とう員 N, Sentōin N)
Voiced by: Yūjirō Kakuda^{Ep. 1 credits}
A loyal footsoldier who stayed in the fortress, submitting to the Dragon Keepers. After spending so much time in the fortress being forced to serve the Dragon Keepers, he eventually is inspired by D and Urabe to stand up to the Executives for their oppression.
Footsoldier Z (戦せん闘とう員 Z, Sentōin Z)
Voiced by: Shōmaru Zōza (Japanese); Jason Marnocha (English)
A loyal footsoldier who stayed in the fortress, submitting to the Dragon Keepers. He was often made to play the fake boss monsters for the Sunday Showdown due to his height and strength. After spending so much time in the fortress being forced to serve the Dragon Keepers, he eventually is inspired by D and Urabe to stand up to the Executives for their oppression.
Footsoldier XX (戦闘員XX, Sentōin Ekusuzu)
Voiced by: Hina Yōmiya (Japanese); Cristina Vee (English)
A stray female footsoldier who left the fortress in search of any surviving boss monsters and resides in Hibiki's room who befriends D.

== Production ==
On October 27, 2020, Negi Haruba started recruiting regular assistants for his coming new series. On December 23, 2020, it was announced that Haruba would start his new manga series Go! Go! Loser Ranger! on February 3, 2021.

On February 19, 2025, it was announced the manga was going on a two-issue hiatus due to Haruba's health issues. It went on another hiatus on May 7 of the same year due to the same reason. On February 18, 2026, it was announced the manga was going on a three-issue hiatus. On July 8 of the same year, it was announced the manga was going on hiatus for a fourth time due to Haruba's health issues. On October 21 of the same year, it was announced the manga was going on hiatus for a fifth time due to Haruba's health issues.

== Media ==
=== Manga ===
Go! Go! Loser Ranger! is written and illustrated by Negi Haruba. The series began serialization in Kodansha's Weekly Shōnen Magazine in the 10th issue published on February 3, 2021. Kodansha has collected its chapters into individual tankōbon volumes. The first volume was released on April 16, 2021. As of November 17, 2026, twenty-three volumes have been released.

In November 2021, during their panel at Anime NYC, Kodansha USA announced their license to the series and would release it in both print and digital.

=== Anime ===
An anime television series adaptation was announced on December 6, 2022. It was produced by Yostar Pictures and directed by Keiichi Sato, with scripts written by Keiichirō Ōchi, and character designs handled by Kahoko Koseki, with Kenji Hayama serving as animation supervisor. The series aired from April 7 to June 30, 2024, on TBS and its affiliates. The opening theme song is "Jikai Yokoku" (次回予告; "Next Time Preview"), performed by Tatsuya Kitani, (Note: "Jikai Yokoku" is heard during the end credits of episode 24.) while the ending theme song is "Seikai wa Iranai" (正解はいらない; "Don't Need the Right Answer"), performed by Akari Nanawo. (Note: "Seikai wa Iranai" is used as an insert song in episode 24.) The series is streaming worldwide on Disney+, and on Hulu in the United States, with the English dub premiered on Hulu on June 12, 2024.

Following the final episode of the first season, a second season was announced, which aired from April 13 to June 29, 2025, on the Agaru Anime programming block on all JNN affiliates, including CBC and TBS. The opening theme song is "Maji de Sekai Kaechau 5-byō Mae" (マジで世界変えちゃう5秒前; "It's Really 5 Seconds Before the World Changes"), performed by Orange Range, while the ending theme song is "Seigi" (正偽; "True False"), performed by Fukurow note. (Note: "Maji de Sekai Kaechau 5-byō Mae" is used as an insert song in episode 24.) (Note: "Seigi" is used as an insert song in episode 24.)

==== Episodes ====
===== Season 1 (2024) =====
No. overall	No. in season	Title	Directed by (Note: Production staff information is taken from the ending credits of each episode.)	Written by	Storyboarded by	Original release date
1	1	"We Are Justice! The Dragon Keepers!"; Transliteration: "Oretachi Seigi sa! Ryūjin Sentai Doragon Kīpā!" (Japanese: 俺たち正義さ！竜神戦隊ドラゴンキーパー！)	Takahiro Kaneko	Keiichirō Ōchi	Keiichi Sato & Takashi Igari	April 7, 2024
A flying fortress appears over the town as a group of heroes called the Dragon Keepers dedicate themselves to defend humanity in a never ending war against the invaders. Thirteen years later, the fortress continues to send down monsters and creatures called Dusters to fight the Dragon Keepers every Sunday in an arena display called the Sunday Showdown. The latest is Ul-Tora Tiger, who puts up a dramatic fight against the Dragon Keepers before being defeated. However, it is revealed that this was all staged. In reality, the Dragon Keepers beat the invaders within the first year they arrived. They set up a truce with the remaining Dusters to have them put on performances like this in exchange for being allowed to live. One of the Dusters, Footsoldier D, has grown tired of this and tries to take a stand against the Dragon Keepers before being swiftly cut down by the Red Keeper. He decides to disguise himself as a human and join the Dragon Keepers so he can take them down from within.
2	2	"Go! Fighter D!"; Transliteration: "Susume! Sentōin D!" (Japanese: 進め！戦闘員D！)	Fukutarō Takahashi	Keiichirō Ōchi	Keiichi Sato & Fukutarō Takahashi	April 14, 2024
D has started his plan by taking the entrance exam to join the Ranger Force. While there, he runs into the two humans he met before, Yumeko Suzukiri and Hibiki Sakurama. They take him out to lunch where he learns that Suzukiri has a mission to deliver a letter to the Red Garrison HQ. Seeing his opportunity, he transforms into Sakurama and accompanies her. Meanwhile, Red and Blue Keeper arrive at the fortress to punish D and scare the Dusters back in line. D plans to stab Red Keeper when he sees him but is scared off by the garrison members and Red Keeper himself. After leaving, Suzukiri reveals she knew about the knife and who D really is. She tells D she wants to work with him to kill the Keepers. Just then, the real Sakurama shows up and says a monster has appeared nearby. The monster is D's friend Footsoldier F, who is trying to find D to bring him back. Red Keeper himself shows up and uses the Divine Artifact to truly kill F.
3	3	"Our Evil Will Bloom, Someday"; Transliteration: "Itsuka, Aku no Hana wa Saku Darou" (Japanese: いつか、悪の花は咲くだろう)	Yasunori Gotō	Keiichirō Ōchi	Keiichi Sato & Kiyotaka Suzuki	April 21, 2024
After witnessing F's death, D runs into Sukurama, who reveals he knows the truth after he overheard D and Suzukiri's conversation. However, he also reveals he wants to make a world where humans and monsters can co-exist, which D rejects. D meets with Suzukiri who tells him that the key to defeat the Keepers is to steal their five Divine Artifacts. She also says that the best time to do this is during the Sunday Showdown. D impersonates the Red Keeper and sneaks into Red Garrison headquarters, but is stopped by garrison member Shun Tokita. Tokita repeatedly kills D but D manages to trick and beat him. As D escapes with the Divine Artifact, he is confronted by the Keepers. Green Keeper comes up with an idea to have D surrender peacefully but D refuses. As such, Blue Keeper uses his Divine Artifact to kill D. When Red Keeper goes to get his artifact back, it is shown to be a fake as it was created by D using his arm Red Keeper severed earlier. The real one was stolen by Suzukiri. Later on, multiple Blue Ranger members are killed by an unknown monster.
4	4	"The Soldier With Love, Hibiki!"; Transliteration: "Ai no Sorujā Hibiki!" (Japanese: 愛のソルジャー日々輝!)	Takashi Igari	Naruhisa Arakawa	Keiichi Sato & Kazuyoshi Katayama	April 28, 2024
The Dragon Keepers have a meeting along with their second-in-commands where Red reveals his Divine Artifact was stolen. His second-in-command argues that he should hand the title of Red Keeper to him, but Red beats him to death. Blue and one of subordinates, Hikeru, investigate the battle site to try and find D and the Divine Artifact. Meanwhile, D is revealed to be alive but now has a stomach wound that will not heal thanks to Blue's Divine Artifact. He is found by Sukurama, who tells D his backstory. They are then found by Hikeru. Sukurama tries to lure him away but after Hikeru threatens him, D arrives to fight. Hikeru counters with a Divine Artifact replica that D cannot touch due to it only being able to be used by someone Hikeru "bonds" with. D runs away and tries to use Sukurama as a hostage. Hikeru backs off and drops the replica. Sukurama grabs it and appears to kill D. In reality, the two made an agreement to swap disguises so D could infiltrate the Rangers. The disguised D and Hikeru fly away in a chopper, while Sukurama stays in the forest disguised as D.
5	5	"Fighter D, as a Part of 'Ranger Force'"; Transliteration: "Ima, Taisen Sai no Naka de" (Japanese: いま、大戦際のなかで)	Takahiro Kaneko	Keiichirō Ōchi	Keiichi Sato & Takahiro Kaneko	May 12, 2024 (Note: Due to the broadcast of The Crowns, this episode was delayed one week from its originally scheduled air date of May 5, 2024.)
A disguised D is living at the independent Ranger's HQ. He smashes Hibiki's laptop which contains all the information Hibiki left behind. While a blue cadet repairs it, D is tasked with delivering badges to all of his fellow trainees. On his way back to his room, D meets Hibiki's sister, who is revealed to be the Pink Keeper Sesera. He runs back to his room and goes to investigate a noise coming from his closet. A female Duster Hibiki has been hiding in his room pops out and attacks him. After revealing his identity, she calms down. Sesera then shows up wanting to talk. She tries to convince Hibiki to have both of them quit the Rangers and go back to living a quiet life. The female Duster hears this and is convinced that D is a traitor. D gets Sesera to temporarily leave so he can trap the female Duster's head in a box. Once Sesera returns, D rejects her offer. When Sesera leaves the room, D convinces the female Duster to work with him. Meanwhile on the ride home, Sesera stops a group of thugs while rejoicing at how much Hibiki has changed.
6	6	"1 Plus 2 Equals... Threat!"; Transliteration: "Ichi Tasu Ni Tasu Sanzanda!" (Japanese: 1たす2たす散々だ!)	Fukutarō Takahashi	Sayaka Harada	Keiichi Sato & Iwao Teraoka	May 19, 2024
D begins training but is beat by the other trainees. XX, the female Duster, reminds him not to get friendly with the other trainees. At the final exam, they are told they will have to fight other Rangers acting as monsters and retrieve a key from them in three days. D gets paired up with a volatile trainee named Kai Shion and sent after a now maimed Tokita. Shion repeatedly tries to fight Tokita but gets defeated each time. While it appears D has run away, in actuality he steals a car and rams it, which also brings the Green Ranger actor, Kanon Hisui, and the trainees fighting her. D gets one of the trainees to draw Tokita and Hisui. He then causes a smokescreen and uses his transformation ability to disorient and aggravate the two into fighting each other. D ambushes Tokita and goads Shion into attacking him as well. Hisui shows up and attacks Tokita and Shion but is stopped from attacking D by the other trainees. D moves in to finish Tokita off but the bell rings before he can, signaling the end of the first day.
7	7	"The Zigzag Road to the Final Exam!"; Transliteration: "Jiguzagu Saishū Shiken Rōdo!" (Japanese: ジグザグ最終試験ロード!)	Ayumu Ono	Keiichirō Ōchi	Keiichi Sato & Kazuyoshi Katayama	May 26, 2024
One of the trainees quit after the first day. Shion says he wants to talk to D but the latter sees XX running outside and goes after her. He catches her in the maintenance area tapping on pipes before locking her back in the closet. D meets back with Shion where they talk about why they joined the Rangers. Shion reveals his brother was killed by a boss monster four years ago despite D thinking all the bosses were killed thirteen years ago. Elsewhere, XX gets discovered by the Blue Ranger who repaired the laptop but is saved by a boss monster, Peltrola, who got her distress message she sent through the pipes earlier. On the second day of the test, D finds out that Shion teamed up with four other trainees to take all the keys. D decides to team up with the remaining trainees to go after the last key held by Suzukiri. She willingly hands it over to them to further help D. However, Shion's team shows up and takes the key just as the bell rings. Meanwhile, Peltrola and XX are making their escape, killing multiple people along the way.
8	8	"Shout Out Loud, Cadets!"; Transliteration: "Kunren-sei, Hoero!" (Japanese: 訓練生、吼えろ!)	Takahiro Kaneko & Tatsuya Nokimori	Naruhisa Arakawa	Keiichi Sato & Kazuyoshi Katayama	June 2, 2024
The elite trainees gloat over their victory when D snatches the key back. It is revealed that the second day is not over yet as the bell ringing early was a trap set by trainee Renmaru to get Suzuriki to lower her guard. D's team manage to hold on to the key until the second day actually ends. Meanwhile, Peltrola and XX are still on their rampage but get confronted by Aizome, who manages to wound Peltrola with her replica Divine Artifact. Elsewhere, D goes around spying on his fellow trainees while the rest of his team recruit a fifth member. Renmaru runs into Peltrola, XX, and Aizome and is seemingly killed when he manages to get Aizome to safety. Peltrola flees to heal from his injuries and leaves XX to dispose of Renmaru's body. The remaining junior rangers team up to hunt Peltrola down. On the third and final day, the teams agree to one-on-one matches. With XX having disguised herself as Renmaru, D's team gain the advantage using a hidden third form of their gadgets called Burst Mode. D fights Shion and easily overwhelms him until Shion accidentally triggers the Burst Mode as well.
9	9	"Battle! Fever! Fighter D!"; Transliteration: "Batoru! Fībā! D!" (Japanese: バトル! フィーバー! D!)	Hiroshi Takeuchi	Keiichirō Ōchi	Keiichi Sato & Hiroshi Takeuchi	June 9, 2024
Aizome is badly injured when the Dragon Spirit Draggie comes to her aid. Meanwhile, D's team takes three of the keys while the fourth is surrendered to Shion's team. Shion and D continue to fight when XX steps in and pins Shion. Just then, the Blue Keeper arrives and uses his Divine Artifact to trap XX. He proceeds to torture her for information about Peltrola. D attempts to kill the Blue Keeper but he fails. D and XX then retreat while the Blue Keeper attacks with homing explosives and laser blasts from his Divine Artifact. While XX loses both of her arms, she rams a truck into him but the Blue Keeper is uninjured. As such, XX states she and D have no chance against him and apologizes to Peltrola. Hearing this provides confirmation to D that a boss monster is actually still alive.
10	10	"It's Showtime for Blue Keeper!"; Transliteration: "Zenryoku Zenkai! Burū Kīpā!" (Japanese: 全力全開! ブルーキーパー!)	Kazuki Yokouchi	Sayaka Harada	Keiichi Sato & Kazuki Yokouchi	June 16, 2024
Given no other option, XX takes D and Blue Keeper to where Peltrola is hiding. Peltrola reveals he has evolved since then and produces a massive army of clones to fight the Blue Keeper. The Blue Keeper holds his own while XX brings D to meet Peltrola. Peltrola thanks D for his continued fighting and states that together they will have their goal of world domination and death of all humanity. However, after remembering the pain he and his fellow Dusters went through for thirteen years and all the new friends he has made, D betrays and kills the Peltrola clone. Besides resenting the boss monster for his long and torturous abandonment, D realizes his ideal world will never be possible if the boss monsters are still around as they would seek to destroy everything instead of ruling it. One of the Peltrola clones tries to escape to the surface but is confronted by the Junior Cadets. Another clone tries to escape through the pipes but is stopped by Shion and the other trainees. D joins them as he states to himself that the only side he is fighting for is himself.
11	11	"On the Road to My Justice!"; Transliteration: "Chōsensha ON THE ROAD!" (Japanese: 挑戦者 ON THE ROAD!)	Shigatsu Yoshikawa & Fukutarō Takahashi	Naruhisa Arakawa	Keiichi Sato & Kazuyoshi Katayama	June 23, 2024
The cadets continue to fight against the Peltrola clone. Unfortunately, Yukino is held hostage after Ishikawa is wounded trying to save her. Elsewhere, it is revealed Suzukiri made a deal with Peltrola to allow one clone to escape, only for the escaped clone to be killed by the Pink Keeper. D convinces the others to surrender their Dragon Gadgets, which causes Akebayashi to run away. Ishikawa distracts Peltrola long enough for Yukino to land a blow on him, while Kurusu grabs one of the smaller clones trying to escape. Akebayashi soon returns with Shippou, who quickly kills the clones. Peltrola seemingly destroys everyone's gadgets. However, it is shown D faked them with his mimicry as Shion and Urabe land a fatal blow on Peltrola. Ishikawa succumbs to his injury following the battle. Blue Keeper's origin story is shown as he continues his fight. Konno sacrifices himself to save the Blue Keeper and gives the latter another cartridge for his Divine Artifact, which he uses to quickly destroy the remaining Peltrola clones just as D appears to challenge him.
12	12	"Never Stop, Fighter D!" (Note: Stylized as "NEVER STOP D!")	Takashi Igari & Takahiro Kaneko	Keiichirō Ōchi	Keiichi Sato, Hiroshi Takeuchi, Kazuyoshi Katayama & Kazuki Yokouchi	June 30, 2024
A series of flashbacks show the day D was born, the day the Keepers defeated the boss monsters, and D's time in the Sunday Showdown. D reveals himself to the Blue Keeper and fights him but is unable to touch him due to the Divine Artifact. However, D finds an opening and rushes to stab him. Just then, a surviving Peltrola clone arrives and kills the Blue Keeper. D is upset at being robbed of his victory and moves to attack Peltrola but XX absorbs the clone and leaves. In the wake of the Blue Keeper's death, multiple revelations are shown: Renmaru is still alive but is in critical condition. D's team consisting of himself, Yukino, Shippou, Usukubo, and Kurusu is being promoted to full Rangers. A secret organization is working from within the Rangers to take them down. The Blue Keeper's Divine Artifact has gone missing. Tokita found out that Suzukiri stole the cartridge to the Red Keeper's missing Divine Artifact, but is unable to reveal it without implicating himself. D is now more determined than ever to complete his mission of killing the Dragon Keepers. Finally, Sakurama is shown hiding in a junkyard.

===== Season 2 (2025) =====
No. overall	No. in season	Title	Directed by	Written by	Storyboarded by	Original release date
13	1	"Look! The Dragon Keepers!"; Transliteration: "Miyo! Doragon Kīpā!" (Japanese: 見よ！ドラゴンキーパー！)	Shigatsu Yoshikawa	Keiichirō Ōchi	Kazuyoshi Katayama & Keiichi Sato	April 13, 2025
A mysterious being known as Hwalipon hijacks multiple screens to tell the public the truth about the Blue Keeper's death. Meanwhile, the Rangers have another Sunday Showdown but are out of sync. The Red Keeper gets angry after getting punched in the face and uses the Dragon Buster, which almost kills the audience. D goes to lunch with Sesera but stops to save a boy named Chidori getting arrested by the police, who think he is behind a string of missing persons cases. After finding out Chidori lied about having a sibling who went missing, D is convinced Peltrola is behind it. Later, D reports to Ranger HQ with Usukubo. There, they meet with Hisui, who informs them that they have been assigned to the Green Squadron and that their job is to hunt down the remaining Boss Monsters.
14	2	"For This School, in This Moment"; Transliteration: "Kono Gakuen o Kono Toki o" (Japanese: この学園をこの時を)	Yūsuke Nakagama	Keiichirō Ōchi	Kazuyoshi Katayama & Keiichi Sato	April 20, 2025
D and the Green Squadron's search for suspicious activity lead them to a school ground where they find themselves trapped in an illusionary loop run by a mysterious organization.
15	3	"Lost Memories"; Transliteration: "Chigireta Kioku" (Japanese: ちぎれた記憶)	Takahiro Kaneko	Keiichirō Ōchi	Takahiro Kaneko & Keiichi Sato	April 27, 2025
D and Hisui prepare for a fight as they discover how the look works, and the Green Squadron ends up reuniting with someone unexpected.
16	4	"Make Our Dreams Come True, Ranger Force"; Transliteration: "Yume o Kanaete Dai Sentai" (Japanese: 夢をかなえて大戦隊)	Fukutarō Takahashi	Naruhisa Arakawa	Fukutarō Takahashi & Keiichi Sato	May 4, 2025
After being forcibly ejected from the illusionary world by Magatia, D makes his way back inside the school with the aid of Detective Nishiki, whose brother had gone missing in the same school.
17	5	"The Arrival of Green -The Maji Tsuyo Force-"; Transliteration: "Gurīn Kōrin ~ Maji Tsuyo Fōsu ~" (Japanese: グリーン降臨 ~マジ強フォース~)	Yūsuke Nakagama	Sayaka Harada	Kazuyoshi Katayama & Keiichi Sato	May 11, 2025
D continues his search for the boss monster Magatia with Hisui and Detectiv Nishiki who seeks to uncover the truth of what happened to his brother.
18	6	"Lost in Confusion... Seriously"; Transliteration: "Gorimuchū Shinken ka......" (Japanese: 五里霧中 真剣か......)	Shigatsu Yoshikawa	Keiichirō Ōchi	Shigatsu Yoshikawa & Keiichi Sato	May 18, 2025
D begins executing his plan to fight the Green Keeper with Suzukiri's help, only to discover deeper truths in doing so.
19	7	"We Are the Monster Protection Society"; Transliteration: "We are the KHK ~ Warera Kaijin Hogo Kyōkai ~" (Japanese: We are the KHK ~我ら怪人保護協会~)	Takahiro Kaneko	Sayaka Harada	Hiroshi Takeuchi & Keiichi Sato	May 25, 2025
The dark nature behind the Ranger Force is exposed to the public by the broadcasts of the Boss monster Hwalipon, and a shadow faction — the Monster Protection Society — makes its move in secret.
20	8	"Come and Join the Monsters!"; Transliteration: "Min'na Atsumare! Kaijin ja" (Japanese: みんな集まれ! 怪人じゃ)	Fukutarō Takahashi	Naruhisa Arakawa	Toshihiko Masuda & Keiichi Sato	June 1, 2025
Public approval for the Rangers plummets after chaotic live-streamed outbursts of their leader, leading to the temporary suspension of the Dragon Keepers. At the same time, D and Hisui confront Yakushi Usukubo - the Head Director of the Monster Protection Society.
21	9	"Here Comes Fighter D!"; Transliteration: "Sentōin D Sanjō!" (Japanese: 戦闘員D参上!)	Shōji Ikeno	Keiichirō Ōchi	Akira Umino & Keiichi Sato	June 8, 2025
D and specific allies of his are in for a shock upon discovering that the divine artifacts originated from dragon God sources, and the Yellow Keeper previously created monsters to continue justifying the Ranger Force's existence after their original enemy was vanquished.
22	10	"A Special Bond ~Hibiki and Sesera~"; Transliteration: "Kizuna ~ Hibiki to Sesera ~" (Japanese: キズナ ~日々輝と世々良~)	Yūsuke Nakagama & Shigatsu Yoshikawa	Naruhisa Arakawa	Toshihiko Masuda & Keiichi Sato	June 15, 2025
The ties that connect Hibiki and Sesera begin unraveling towards an unexpected outcome when the Boss monsters make their move.
23	11	"The Dragon Keepers vs. Deathmecia"; Transliteration: "Doragon Kīpā VS Desumeshia" (Japanese: ドラゴンキーパーVSデスメシア)	Keisuke Nishijima	Keiichirō Ōchi	Kazuyoshi Katayama & Keiichi Sato	June 22, 2025
As the world falls under attack by the Monster Army after the Monster Protection Society's true nature is revealed, D renews his resolve once again and rises to the occasion with his friends. Everyone joins together from the Dragon Keepers to the cadets and even to the Fighters from the floating fortress, putting aside their differences to unite against a common threat.
24	12	"The One and Only Fighter D"; Transliteration: "D Koso Onrīwan" (Japanese: Dこそオンリーワン)	Fukutarō Takahashi, Takashi Igari & Takahiro Kaneko	Keiichirō Ōchi	Keiichi Sato & Akira Umino	June 29, 2025
The final battle with Deathmecia concludes after a fierce struggle. D convinces Angel Usukubo to reclaim her individuality, ultimately ending the conflict and restoring a fickle peace for the time being.

=== Stage play ===
On July 1, 2024, a stage play was announced. It ran at Theatre G-Rosso in Tokyo from September 11 to September 16, 2024.

== Reception ==
The manga has been nominated for the seventh Next Manga Award in the Best Printed Manga category in 2021.
