= Issue (magazine) =

South Korean comic magazine

- Coverof the August 2008 issue
- Categories: Comics
- Frequency: Monthly
- Publisher: Daewon C.I.
- First issue: December 15, 1995
- Country: South Korea
- Based in: Seoul
- Language: Korean
- Website: 홈페이지 대원만화 블로그

Issue (Korean: 이슈) is a South Korean magazine published by Daewon C.I. Its first publication was made in 1995, and it is currently released on the 25th day of each month. It specializes in serialization of domestic and imported comics that are mostly targeted towards women. Individual titles are collected into volumes and published under the Issue Comics imprint. Light novels imported from Japan are also translated and published under the name Issue Novels.

Below is a list of all titles serialized in the magazine and published under its book imprint, Issue Comics. Titles are separated into domestic publications and translated works licensed from foreign publishing companies.

== Domestic titles ==
Title	Creator	Years
50 Rules for Teenagers (특명! 10대에 하지 않으면 안될 50가지, Teukmyeong! 10daee Haji Anheumyeon Andoer 50gaji)	Na Ye-ri (나예리)	1998-2004
A Seduction More Beautiful Than Love (사랑보다 아름다운 유혹, Sarang Boda Areumdaun Yuhok)	Lee Hyeon-sook (이현숙)	2004-2005
Adami Mandeun Ohu (아담이 만든 오후)	Kim Ki-hye (김기혜)	1996
Agnus Dei (아뉴스데이, Anyuseudei)	Hwang Mi-na (황미나)	1998-1999
Aju Teukbyeolhan Geol (아주 특별한 걸)	Kim Ji-yeong (김지영)	2001-2002
Akasig Rekodeu Sang (아카식 레코드 상)	Choi Kyung-ah (최경아)	1998
The Queen of Anites (안티퀸 쓰파걸, Antikwin Sseupageol)	Jeon Su-hyeon (전수현)	2007-present
Arakeunoa (아라크노아)	Kim Hye-rin (김혜린)	1998
Arcana (아르카나, Areukana)	Lee So-yeong (이소영)	2003-2008
Aron's Absurd Armada (아론의 무적함대, Aronui Mujeokhamdae)	Kim Mi-seon (김미선)	2008-present
Atreuta Yeondaegi Ha (아테르타 연대기 하)	Lee Joung-a (이정애)	1996
Bad Guys (나쁜 녀석들, Nappeun Nyeoseokdeul)	Kim Ki-hye (김기혜)	1997-2001
Banji's Dream Bubbling (반지꿈은 방울방울, Banjikkumeun Bangulbangul)	Jong-i (종이)	2008-2008
Banji and BongBong Club (반지와 봉봉클럽, Banjiwa Bongbongkeulleop)	Jong-i (종이)	2004-2005
Be My Sweet Darling (스위트 달링이 되어줘, Seuwiteu Dalling I Doeeojwo)	Do Chan (도짱)	2003
Bibi (비비, Bibi)	Choi Kyung-ah (최경아)	2004-present
Bicheonmu (비천무)	Kim Hye-rin (김혜린)	1997
Bicheonmu Aejangpan (비천무 애장판)	Kim Hye-rin (김혜린)	2005
Bisangsojib - Jeonggangie Pin Kkocbonguri (비상소집 - 정강이에 핀 꽃봉우리)	Ko Yu-ri (고유리)	2000-2002
Bur ui Geom (불의 검)	Kim Hye-rin (김혜린)	1999-2004
Bur ui Geom Aejanagpan (불의 검 애장판)	Kim Hye-rin (김혜린)	2002-2005
Ciel (씨엘, Ssiel)	Rhim Ju-yeon	2005-present
Comic Club (코믹클럽, Komikkeulleop)	Kim Ji-yun (김지윤)	1997
DaDa!!	Mun Na-yeong (문나영)	2003-2004
Daddy Long Legs (키다리 아저씨, Kidari Ajeossi)	Kim Hyung-jun (김형준)	2004-2005
Daenggi Sonyeo Dyeon (댕기소녀 뎐)	Ahn Jung-hui (안정희)	2001-2003
Dear Diary (디어 다이어리, Diao Daieori	Yun Lee-hyeon (윤이현)	2006-2007
Devil's Bride (악마의 신부, Akmaui Sinbu)	Rhim Ju-yeon	2001
Donginbaekseo (동인백서)	Park Jim-i (박진아), story; Jang So-yeong (장소영), art	2008-2009
End (엔드, Endeu)	Seo Moon Da-mi (서문다미)	1999-2002
Funny Money (퍼니머니 리치걸, Peonimeoni Richigeol)	Seo Su-yeon (서수연), story; Cha Kyung-hui (차경희), art	2005-2006
Geungyeoseokgwa Na (그녀석과 나)	Shim Hye-jin	2001
Geureonikka Joha (그러니까 좋아)	Lee Si-yeong (이시영)	2007
Girls on Top (걸스 온 탑, Geolseu on Tap)	Cha Kyung-hee (신지상)	2007-present
Ghost Stage (고스트 스테이지, Goseuteu Seuteiji)	Park Il-ha (박일하)	2002
Go! Go! (高! GO!)	Jo Eun-sil (조은실)	2001-2002
Gongjunimggwa Geondalnim (공주님과 건달님)	Kim Hui-kyung (김희경)	2005-2007
Ghost Gate (귀문(鬼門), Gwimun)	Yeondu (연두)	2007-2009
Haetbicsogeuro (햇빛속으로)	Kim Ji-yun (김지윤)	1999
Happy & Murphy (해피 앤 머피, Haepi aen Meopi)	Ko Min-jung (고민정)	2004-2005
Haneulgwa Nalda (하늘과 날다)	Kang Hye-jin (강혜진)	2007-2009
Hannune Banhada (한눈에 반하다)	Lee Si-yeong (이시영)	2006-present
Happy Epicurean (행복한 미식가, Haengbokhan Misikga)	Seomoon Da-sil (서문다실), story; Seomoon Da-mi (서문다미), art	2007
Happy Wild (해피 와일드, Haepi Waildeu)	Seo Jin (서진)	2003-2004
Horror Collector (호러컬렉터, Horeo Keollekteo)	Lee So-yeong (이소영)	2007-2008
Igoseun Naui Neipkeullobeo (이곳은 나의 네잎클로버)	Park Mi-suk (박미숙)	2008-present
Isanghan Naraui Hasukjip 이상한 나라의 하숙집	Ha Seong-hyeon (하성현)	2006-present
Jigueseo Yeongeopjung (지구에서 영업중)	Lee Si-yeong (이시영)	2002-2005
Kill Me, Kiss Me	Lee Young-you	2000-2002
Kongkkakji (콩깍지)	Lee Sang-eun (이상은)	2000-2002
Les Bijoux	Jo Eun-ha (조은하), story; Park Sang-sun (박상선), art	2000-2001
Little Queen (소녀왕, Sonyeowang)	Kim Yeon-joo (김연주)	2003-2006
Memory Eaters (기억술사, Gieocksulsa)	Kang Kyung-nam (강경남)	2007
Model	Lee So-young (이소영)	1999-2001
Mureungdowoneuro Oseyo (무릉도원으로 오세요)	Choe Su-jeong (최수정)	2008-present
My Guardian Chick, Pi (안녕, Pi Annyoung, Pi)	Shin Yu-ha (신유하)	2007-present
My Sweet Home (마이 스위트 홈, Mai Seuwiteu Hom)	Maru (마루), story; Kim Jin-hui (김진희), art	2006-2007
Myeongtaejadyeoh Aejangpan (명태자뎐 애장판)	Choi Kyung-ah (최경아)	2003
Nabi: The Prototype (나비, Nabi)	Kim Yeon-joo (김연주)	2005-present
Naegen Neomu Jaegeun Yeonin (내겐 너무 작은 연인)	Kim Ji-eun (김지은)	1998
Naemeotdaero Dodogeol (내멋대로 도도걸)	Kim Ye-bin (김예빈)	2008-present
Naesarang Bongja (내사랑 봉자)	Park Yeon-ah (박연아) story; Keum Myung (금명) art	2005-2007
Nage Neomu Sarang Seureoun Ttungttaengi (내게 너무 사랑스러운 뚱땡이)	Lee Hui-jeong (이희정)	2003-2005
Nalari Sueop (날라리 수업)	Yeondu (연두), story; Kim Ye-bin (김예빈), art	2006-2007
Nampyeon ui Jogeon (남편의 조건)	Lee Si-yeong (이시영)	2007
Nanairang Geuru's One Fine Day (나나이랑 그루's One Fine Day)	Shi Ri-eol (시리얼)	2007-present
Next Town (라이어 타운, Raieo Taun)	Lee Ju-ryeong (이주령)	2007-present
Nocturne (녹턴, Nokteon)	Park Eun-ah (박은아)	2008-present
Office Girl J (오피스 걸 J, Opiseu Geol J)	Cider (사이다)	2008-present
Orange Bubble Gum (오렌지 버블껌, Orenji Beobeul Kkeom)	Mun Na-yeong (문나영)	2005
Paendeonteu (팬던트)	Lee Yeong-suk (이영숙)	1998
Pahanjip (파한집, 破閑集)	Yun Ji-un (윤지운)	2006-2008
Partner (파트너, Pateuneo)	Ryu Sung-soon (류승순)	2006-2007
Peter Panda (피터 판다, Piteo Panda)	Na Ye-ri (나예리)	2005-2007
Pibada Hagwongi (피바다 학원기)	Park Yeon-ah (박연아), story; Eun-hui (은희), art	2006-present
President Dad	Rhim Ju-yeon	2002-2004
Priceless	Lee Young-you	2003
Princess (프린세스, Peurinseseu)	Han Seung-won (한승원)	1999-present
Promise (프라미스, Peuramiseu)	Lee Eun-young (이은영)	2005-present
Pure Love Stories (순애보, Sunaebo)	Various	2006-present
Ready Go! (레디 고!, Redi Go!)	Baek Sang-eun (백상은)	2004-2005
Redrum 327' (레드럼 327)	Ko Ya-seong (고야성)	2003-2004
Reobeullirinui Jemeotdaero Sinema Toking Eobaut (러블리린의 제멋대로 시네마 토킹 어바웃!!)	Yun Rin (윤린)	2004
Rolling (롤링, Rolling)	Cha Kyung-hee (신지상)	2004-present
Ruby Doll (루비돌, Rubi Dol)	Choi Kyung-ah (최경아)	2006-present
Saint Marie	Yang Yoo-jin (양여진)	2002-present
Saver (세이버, Seibeo)	Lee Eun-young (이은영)	2002-present
Sebeuntin Rock (세븐틴 락)	Lee Kang-ju (이강주)	1997-2000
Seol (설)	Kim Ki-hye (김기혜)	1996-1999
Seol Aejangpan (설 애장판)	Kim Ki-hye (김기혜)	2004-2005
Seulpeunyeonga (슬픈연가)	Cha Kyung-hee (신지상)	2005
Shin Il-suk's Short Story Collection (신일숙 단편집, Shin Il-suk Danpyeonjip)	Shin Il-suk (신일숙)	1996-1998
Snow Drop (스노우 드롭, Seunou Deurop)	Choi Kyung-ah	1999-2003
Sodellinigyosu ui Sagosucheop (소델리니교수의 사고수첩)	Lee Joung-a (이정애)	1998-2000
Sonyeon Buseojida (소년 부서지다)	Lee Ju-ryeong (이주령)	2002-2003
Spam Mail Hunter (SM헌터, SM Heonteo)	You Na (유나)	2005-present
Super Scandal (슈퍼 스캔들, Syupeo Seukaendeul)	Lee Ji-yu (이지유)	2003-2004
Supui Ireum (숲의 이름)	Kim Jin (김진)	1996-1997
Sweet and Sensitive (다정다감, Dajeong Dagam)	Park Yeon-ah (박은아)	1999-2007
Sweet Recipe (스위트 레시피, Seuwiteu Resipi)	Yun Lee-hyeon (윤이현)	2004
Syaman ui Bawi (샤만의 바위)	Kim Hye-rin (김혜린)	1998
The Flower of Evil (악의 꽃, Aguikkoc)	Lee Hyeon-sook (이현숙)	2006-2008
The Sareksyon Eumbansa (The 세렉숀 음반사)	Yun Rin (윤린)	2004-present
Time Between Dog and Wolf(개와 늑대의 시간, Gaewa Neukdaeui Sigan)	You Na (유나)	2007-present
Too Young to Die	Lee Sang-eun (이상은)	1999-2000
Ttoraekung Sadjjakkung Urikkiri Araboneun Simri Teseuteu (또래쿵 살짝쿵 우리끼리 알아보는 심리 테스트)	Kang Nam-kong (강남콩)	2004
Ujubyeor Reobeueotaek (우주별 러브어택)	Kim Si-yeon (김시연)	2004-2005
Un	Kim U-hyeon (김우현)	2001-2002
Under the Glass Moon (유리달 아래서, Yuridar Araeseo)	Ko Ya-seong (고야성)	2001
Victory Viki (빅토리 비키, Biktori Biki)	Han Seung-won (한승원)	2002-2003
We Are Still...! (우리는 아직..!, Urineun Ajik)	Lee Ji (이지)	2004-2006
Wing (윙, Wing)	Kim Yun-jung (김윤정)	2000-2002
Xtra Syndrome (Xtra 신드롬, Xtra Sindeurom)	Jo Eun-ha (조은하)	1998
Yangachi Kelleop (양아치 클럽)	Chae Min2 (채민2)	2002-2003

== Licensed titles ==
Title	Localized Title	Creator	Years	Origin
Atashin'chi	아따맘마, Attamamma	Eiko Kera	2004-2008	Japan
Baby and Me	아기와 나, Agiwana	Marimo Ragawa	1995-2002	Japan
Gakko no Ojikan	학교에 가자!, Hakgyoe Gaja	Mimi Tajima	2004-present	Japan
Gakuen Prince	학원왕자, Hagwonwangja	Jun Yuzuki	2007-present	Japan
Hanasekeru Seishounen	카시카	Natsumi Itsuki	1997-2000	Japan
Koucha Ōji	홍차왕자	Nanpei Yamada	1998-2004	Japan
Koucha Ōji no Himegimi	애장판 홍차왕자, aejangpan Hongchawangja	Nanpei Yamada	2008-present	Japan
Papillon -Hana to Chō-	빠삐용, Ppappiyon	Miwa Ueda	2007-present	Japan
Penguin Revolution	펭귄혁명, Penggwin Hyeokmyeong	Sakura Tsukuba	2005-2008	Japan
Sailor Moon	달의 요정 세일러문	Naoko Takeuchi	1997-1999	Japan
Shanimuni Go	Just Go Go!, 저스트 고고!	Marimo Ragawa	1999-present	Japan
Sprout	스프라우트, 스프라우트	Atsuko Nanba	2006-present	Japan
