= Priceless =

Priceless may refer to:

- Something so rare, unique or desirable that it transcends normal concepts of price; in other words, it cannot be sold at any price
- Priceless (2006 film) (aka Hors de prix), a 2006 French film starring Audrey Tautou
- Priceless (2016 film), an American film starring Joel Smallbone
- Priceless (horse), a horse that competed at Olympic level in eventing
- Priceless (manhwa), a three-volume graphic novel series by Lee Young You
- Priceless (professional wrestling), the former name for tag team and stable of Ted DiBiase, Jr. and Cody Rhodes
- Priceless (TV series), 2012 Japanese television drama starring actor Takuya Kimura
- Priceless (advertising campaign), a long-running and successful ad campaign of MasterCard that has entered into the lexicon of common pop culture

== Music ==
- Priceless (Birdman album), 2009 rap album
- Priceless (Elkie Brooks album), a compilation album by Elkie Brooks
- Priceless (Frankie J album), 2006
- Priceless (Kelly Price album), 2003 R&B and soul album
- "Priceless" (song), a song by Maroon 5, from the 2025 album Love Is Like
- "Priceless", a song by Melanie Fiona from the 2009 album The Bridge
- "Priceless", a song by Mayday Parade from the 2011 album Mayday Parade
- "Priceless", a song by Flo Rida from the 2008 album Mail on Sunday
- "Priceless", a song by Jolin Tsai from the 2007 album Agent J
- "Priceless", a song by For King & Country from the 2014 album Run Wild. Live Free. Love Strong.

== People ==
- Priceless the Kid (born 1987), American artist, musician, and song writer

== See also ==
- Price (disambiguation)
