= Saver (manhwa) =

Historical fantasy manhwa

- Cover of the Tokyopop edition of Saver vol. 1 (2006), art by Lee Eun-young

^세이버
- Genre: Fantasy
- Author: Lee Eun-young
- Publisher: (South Korea) Daewon C.I.
- English publisher: (United States) Tokyopop
- Magazine: (South Korea) Issue
- Original run: 2002–2010
- Collected volumes: 17

Saver (세이버) is a manhwa written by Lee Eun-young (이은영). It is a historical fantasy based around an emotionally scarred woman who is transported magically to the Scottish Middle Ages. Serialized in the magazine Issue, the publication has accumulated seventeen volumes since 2002 and is completed. Its English translation under Tokyopop was discontinued after six volumes.

== Plot ==
Lena Ha is a beautiful and tough girl who is the captain of kumdo team. She grew up under the eye of her single mother, who is constantly harassed by the wife of Lena's father. She meets Hyun-Min Kang, the son of the president of a large company in Korea, and the two seem to feel love at first sight. The couple learn that they are half-siblings, and Hyun-Min's mother thinks Lena has motives of revenge for her relationship with Hyun-Min. Thus Hyun-Min's mother sends her thugs to take care of the problem. They murder Lena's mother with Lena's sword and then chase Lena down and attack her until she falls into a strange body of water. When Lena comes to, she finds herself in an unfamiliar kingdom, with only the sword that ended her mother's life and thoughts of revenge. She is told by a prophet that her only way to return home is to disguise herself as a man and find the rightful king of the land. On her journey to find this man she comes to discover a feeling of responsibility towards the people of this land, and the people of the land discover that they might have found their "Child of Destiny."

== Characters ==
=== The Five ===
Lena Ha (aka Ley) is an intelligent, strong, and beautiful Korean girl who was the captain of the kumdo team. She lived with her single adoptive mother, a self-proclaimed 'Herb Fanatic,' whom Lena tried to protect from her father's wife. She despises her father, but also wants his acknowledgment, which she thinks she could only have earned had she been born a boy. Upon her arrival in the Scottish Middle Ages, she hides her sex and calls herself "Ley" and is known as a fearsome warrior. Her actions and words show the charisma of "a born leader", causing many to follow her instinctively. When she meets Maron, she is told she is originally from Scotland, not Korea. A child of Jira, who became a concubine of the King of Aran. Lena had been stolen as a baby by the previous Queen Ariana who had become mentally unstable from the loss of her son to her daughter who later became Queen Eleanor. After Maron told Eleanor that Lena would eventually kill her, she pushed Ariana and Lena into the river. Before Ariana drowned, she sent Lena to present-day Korea where she was adopted by her mother. After the final battle at Sevia, Ariana sends Lena back to Korea where she says her goodbyes to Hyun-Min and then returns to Scotland to stay.

Sean Renock the 3rd is one of Ley's first companions. Sean is a bored prince who, after a fight with his father, leaves his castle and heads toward the city in search of adventure. He finds it in Ley, whose skill in breaking up a bar fight causes Sean to respect Ley's fighting ability. Ley refuses to take Sean under her wing, but cannot shake him from following. Sean is a very pure-hearted and inexperienced boy, and as a result is often the butt of jokes about his ineptitude.

Cid is another of Ley's early companions, who has sworn an oath to avenge the death of his father by the Jager Tribe. He meets Ley soon after Ley escapes the slave trading practices of the Jagers. He teams up with Ley to successfully save the rest of the slaves including Sean. Because of Ley's charisma Cid is convinced that Ley is the Child of the Prophecy, and vows to protect him.

Michael is another companion of Ley's who is quite mysterious. He seems to have an untrustworthy aura around him, and both Cid and Ley are slightly wary of him. It is revealed he is a "toy" of Queen Eleanor who sent to capture the Child of the Prophecy. Instead he falls in love with Ley, and walks the tenuous line between betraying his owner and betraying his love. His name was given to him by the queen for his "angelic beauty".

Sharis is a short-tempered, young girl with excellent archery skills. She attempted to murder the Earl in his sleep, however she was badly injured and barely managed to escape. Sean finds her in the woods and brings her back to Cid. After she recovers, she becomes the last of "the five" to join Ley's group. She despises the Earl as he killed & burned down her entire village in exchange for her sister, Brenna, "the woman he wanted the most", who he keeps captive in his castle.

=== Royalty ===
Lucien Wyclef is the rightful king of Tamir who lost his kingdom to the Earl Auye plunging his subjects into tyranny and poverty. At one point he tries to reclaim his kingdom through a marriage alliance with the powerful, but tyrannical Queen Eleanor. He and Ley meet each other in a dream, and he proclaims her his true love and kisses her before a shadow, later discovered to be Queen Eleanor, takes him away. Upon waking, he decides to ignore the dreams of love and continue his political advancement through marriage. He later meets Ley and is confused by the fact that Ley is a "man" though he cannot shake the feelings he has toward Ley. He later discovers that Ley true gender during the gladiator battle that took place the day before he was to be wed to Queen Eleanor.

Arena Wyclef is Lucien's younger sister, and a princess of Tamir. She lost her voice due to the shock of her parents' murder.

Jaime Wyclef is Lucien's younger brother, and a prince of Tamir. He has been missing since the murder of his parents, and is assumed to be dead.

Lucien's parents are the former king and queen of Tamir who were murdered by Earl Auye during a revolt of the top feudal Earls of Tamir when Lucien was still in his early teens. The influence Lucien's father had on him plays a big part in how Lucien acts and makes decisions.

Queen Eleanor is a dark and sadistic woman who is essentially responsible for the breakout of war. She strategically has planned everything from the start, manipulating many people such as the Jager tribe and the Earl. She has disturbing methods of torturing and brands the majority of her prisoners. She is entertained by murder and has killed so many people that the river carries hundreds of corpses. When she was a child, she pushed Ariana and Lena into the river, which resulted in Lena being sent to present-day Korea. During the final battle at Sevia, she is killed by the 'ghost' of Ariana.

Ariana was a member of the Leon tribe until she was raped by the king of Kabul, and was forced to marry him and become queen of Kabul. Four years after she gave birth to Eleanor, she gave birth to a son who Eleanor killed as a baby. Afterward, Ariana went insane. Several years later, the king took her to a party in Aran, and Ariana stole baby Lena from Jira and then returned to Kabul. Shortly afterward, she and the baby were pushed into the river by Eleanor, and Ariana used the last of her power before she died to send Lena to present-day Korea.

Eleanor's father is the former king of Kabul. He got lost in the Leon Tribe's land, and happened upon Ariana. He fell in love with her at first sight, raped her, and forced her to marry him. He loved Eleanor, and doted on her.

Siegfried is the prince of Aran, and Lena's stepbrother. He is very immature and frequently flirts with girls, including Ley and Eleanor. Initially he seems to be on the Queens side, but it is revealed that he was only getting close to her to kill her and take control of Kabul. He openly supports Lucien later on, and helps him escape with the others after the gladiator fight.

Sean Renock the 2nd is Sean's father, and the king of Laud. He is very strict with Sean, but only because he is trying to protect him. He and his wife were put into captivity by his illegitimate son, but were later rescued by Sean. He supports Lucien in the war between Kabul and Tamir.

Kal is Sean's half-brother, and was Laud's captain of defense. He was unsatisfied with his position, and started a rebellion while Sean was missing. With the help of Earl Auye, he became the king of Laud for a short time, until Sean returned and put the real king back into power. He is imprisoned until Sean's father decides what to do with him.

=== Leon Tribe ===
Members of the Leon Tribe all have pale hair and eyes, special powers, incredibly long lives, and are very powerful warriors. Their beauty often causes them to be mistaken for fairies. They tend to keep to themselves, content to quietly and peacefully ignore the conflicts of the surrounding countries. They are merciless to those who happen to trespass on their land, especially toward those of the Jager Tribe. Ley manages to convince them to support Lucien in the war between Kabul and Tamir.

Shine is a high-ranking individual in the Leon Tribe, and Ariana's older brother. He leads the armies in battle. He seems to have special feelings for Ley, telling her that he doesn't have a lover because "there was no one like you," and frequently helps and protects her.

The tribe leader is Ariana's father. For a long time he was neutral in the conflict, presumably "keeping an eye on" Eleanor to make sure her Leon powers didn't awaken. Ley convinces him to take action, and he allows the Leon army to aid Lucien.

Gideon is a prophet who saved Lena when she first appeared in his world, he is also the major prophet Kabul. He and his foster daughter, Maria, find and save Lena after she was stabbed. He believes that Lena is the 'Child of the Prophecy', who is meant to save his world. He has Lena disguise herself as a man under the name of "Ley." After the attack on his village which separated him and Lena, he has been traveling with his foster daughter.

Maron is an elderly Leon who was confined to a cave under Eleanor's orders. Her power to only speak the truth was used by Eleanor to hunt people down, including Ariana and Lena, thus burdening her with constant guilt over the murders. She is the one who made the prophecy about Ley, and used to be Ariana's maidservant.

=== Jager Tribe ===
The members of the Jager tribe are assassins under the control of Queen Eleanor, and are led by Yuriel. They all bear tattoos somewhere on their bodies. They are the enemies of the Leon Tribe. They eventually turn against Eleanor when she kills the majority of them under the suspicion that they were preparing to betray her.

Yuriel was the chief of the Jager tribe, and Daniel's older brother. He planned to capture the Child of the Prophecy and use that power to become the next ruler. He was cruel and merciless, ordering his troops to kill and destroy entire villages (women and children included). He was killed by Ley during the final battle at Sevia.

Kiel was one of the Jagers who went to Billa to find the Child of the Prophecy. After discovering Ley in Gideon's house, Gideon killed him. He was Ethelle's brother.

Ethelle is one of the Jagers closest to Yuriel. She seems to have a connection with Gideon, and holds a grudge against him for killing her brother, Kiel. She is Kiel's sister.

Joel was one of the Jagers who killed Cid's father. Cid hunted him down and wounded his eye, and shortly afterward he was killed by Leons.

Nicole is a Jager also involved in Cid's father's death, and is running from Cid.

Camiel is a Jager who was in charge of keeping track of Lady Linua. He eventually switches sides, and helps Sharis and Linua escape when they are being held captive by the Earl.

Daniel is Yuriel's younger brother and polar opposite. He is rarely serious, and tends to do things very half-heartedly to irritate Yuriel. He is only shown as being angry when Eleanor kills most of the Jagers after the Earl tried to get them to follow him instead.

=== Allies ===
Willem is Lucien's grandfather, and the Earl of Belus. He is often called the Wise One, or the Great One. He is a scholar and considered to be the greatest intellectual of that time. Ley entrusted his katana in Willem's care after they escaped from the Cave of Death, and he gave it to Lucien much later. He knows Ley came from a different world.

Ian is a man who bears a striking resemblance to Hyun-Min. He is the leader of a village of thieves that had joined together after escaping their previously miserable lifestyles. He has no memories of his childhood, therefore his true family and birthplace are unknown. After the village was attacked and destroyed by Yuriel's army, he swore to rebuild it and start again. He promised to help Ley's group if ever needed. He aided Sean in returning Laud to Sean's father's control. He seems to have special feelings for Linua.

Max is the captain of the guards at Glasgow. He was removed from his position by Chris and labeled a rebel because of his loyalty to Lucien. He threatened Ley and his friends to rescue Earl Romero, and was reunited with Lucien soon after. Later on, he discovered Eleanor's plans to use Lucien, but was captured before he could warn anyone. He was imprisoned for a while until he was put into the gladiator ring alongside Ley and Sharis where he was severely wounded protecting Ley.

Nox is one of Lucien's servants, and accompanies Lucien wherever he goes. The two are very good friends. For Lucien's sake, he often tries to bring Lucien and Ley closer to one another.

Romero is the Earl of Glasgow, and Chris' uncle. He was imprisoned and had his eyes gouged out by Yuriel when Chris took over Glasgow. He was later rescued by Ley and his friends under Max's request.

Lady Linua is the illegitimate daughter of Earl Auye, and is used as a tool in the Earl and Eleanor's plans. However, she often runs away with her maid to avoid doing what the Earl wants. She fell in love with Ley when he rescued her from Ian in the Forest of Evil. Later, her focus of affection changes to Ian. She helps Sharis, Ley, and Sean infiltrate Earl Auye's castle to rescue Sharis' sister and allow Lucien to attack the castle, resulting in her father's death.

=== Enemies ===
Chris was the ruler of Glasgow with the help of Yuriel. He had a preference for men, and tended to flirt with whoever he liked the looks of. He fled to Cunak after Glasgow was taken from him. He held a grudge against Ley for a facial injury Ley inflicted on him after he killed Edith. He was later killed by Ley during the final battle at Sevia.

Earl Auye is a usurper who was once the minister of the former kingdom of Tamir. His shameless and merciless strategies often cause attacked nations to lose all hope of ever rising again. He holds especial disdain for Lucian Wyclef and vows to take "all he holds dear". In contrast to his cruel nature, he is known for being very beautiful. He is Linua's father, and tries to get her to marry Kal (as well as Sean, before he disappeared) to gain power in Laud. Sharis' older sister, Brenna, is his wife, and they have a son. Auye was killed by Lucien when Tamir's armies attacked his castle in Cunak. (EDIT: Earl Auye was killed by his wife, Sharis' sister, Brenna, with a dagger because he killed her family and village, then kidnapped and raped her. She then voluntarily married him because she did not want to raise her child as a bastard and was waiting for the right time to strike.)

Mark is the younger cousin of Earl Auye, and one of the leaders of the Earl's armies. He is very loyal to the Earl, and follows his orders without hesitation. He is killed by Ley during the battle at Rohim due to an underestimation of the town's people's fighting skills.

Demitri is Mark's younger brother. He is cruel and violent, showing obvious jealousy toward Mark when the Earl puts him in charge of leading the armies. He is often at odds with the Earl, disagreeing with the Earl's reckless battle plans and strategies. After Mark's death, Demitri kills all of the survivors in Rohim, resulting in Ley chasing him down for revenge.

Yan was one of Queen Eleanor's servants. His position and duties were similar to that of Michael's, though he seemed to be of a slightly lower rank. He was very competitive with Michael, and often taunted him when Eleanor chose him over Michael for a task. When he attempted to kill Michael during the final battle at Sevia, Lucien killed him.

=== People from the Present ===
Hyun-Min Kang is Lena's half brother, who fell in love with her before he learned of their family connections. He continues to love her after he finds out they share a father and insists that their blood should have nothing to do with their love. After his mother discovered the relationship between Lena and Hyun-Min she attempted to have Lena murdered but in the confusion Hyun-Min was injured and slipped into a coma. He is later shown sitting catatonic in a wheel chair outside a hospital when Lena returns to say goodbye to him.

Lena's mother is a weak woman who found Lena as a baby during an attempt at suicide. She adopted Lena and passed her off as her ex-lover's baby with whom she was still in love with, though he had no feelings for her. She often frustrated Lena because of her pathetic love. She raised Lena like a boy in a futile attempt to gain his recognition. Lena's father's wife despised them both and often harassed them. Eventually, she hired thugs that killed Lena's mother using Lena's own sword. Lena swore to purify the sword with the blood of her mother's killers.

Lena's father is the president of a large company, and Lena's adoptive mother's ex-lover. He has a strong yet cold personality, and it was once said that Lena had inherited this. He puts the reputation of his company before Lena (an illegitimate child) and her mother (of low status). Lena claims it is because they "remind him that he has made mistakes" that he ignores them both. His words towards Lena are harsh, but they often don't match what he truly feels. His cold, cruel attitude towards Lena likely contributed to her distrust of others.

Hyun-Min's mother is the wife of Lena's father, and technically Lena's stepmother. She absolutely despises both Lena and her mother, calling them "cheap and dirty". She sends thugs after Lena who accidentally send Hyun-Min into a coma. After hearing of this, she becomes furious and sends more thugs who kill both Lena's mother and Hee-Soo Kwon.

Hee-Soo Kwon is Lena's roommate. She deeply loves Lena without ulterior motives, which Lena can't understand. Out of jealousy, Hee-Soo informs Hyun-Min's mother of Hyun-Min's relationship with Lena. The situation quickly spirals out of control, and Hee-Soo regrets her actions. She is killed by thugs while acting as a decoy for Lena to escape.

Chief Noh is Lena's father's assistant. He is the one who tells Hyun-Min that Lena was in trouble after Hyun-Min's mother finds out about his and Lena's relationship. He often shows concern for Lena's relationship with her father.

Seung-Wook Park is one of the members of the kumdo team. He is egotistical and relies on his father's power and influence to get him a position in the kumdo nationals, rather than Lena. He frequently starts fights with the other team members, and constantly challenges Lena's leadership due to the fact that she's a girl. She finally confronts him and wins against him in a sword fight, after which she kicks him off the team.

=== Minor characters ===
Edith is a shy, kind woman from Billa who fell in love with Ley. She was captured and taken to Glasgow where she was tortured for information about the 'Child of the Prophecy'. Ley came to save her, but she was killed by Chris before they could escape.

Maria is Gideon's foster daughter. Gideon found her in a village full of corpses when she was a baby. She has a mysterious healing power, and used it to save Lena when she first arrived in Scotland. Maria has a pet squirrel named Yoshi who is often a source of jealousy for Gideon.

Anna is a woman from Billa who loves Gideon, and often helps him take care of Maria. After Billa was destroyed by Yuriel, she left with Gideon and Maria, and they went to Lucia Island. When Gideon and Maria left the island to find Ley, she stayed.

Ruan is Cid's father, and one of the twelve knights of Kabul who swore to protect the Child of the Prophecy. He was fatally wounded by members of the Jager Tribe, and instructed Cid to find and protect the Child in his place.

Dein is one of Lucien's servants, and stays at Ashton castle to protect it in Lucien's absence.

Adam Wilson is a very mysterious servant to the Earl who was responsible for planning the attack on Leven, Campbell, and Dumlon. He is impressively well-informed concerning current and past events. His entire face has never been fully shown, making him more mysterious. Ley, Cid, and Sean once stayed with a woman named Margaret who claimed Ley reminded her of her husband who she had not seen in some time. She asked Ley to tell Adam Wilson that "Margaret was waiting for him", however Ley and Adam have not met. When the Earl is killed, Adam tells Camiel that he was only using the Earl's power, and was not truly loyal to him. He then prepares to return to Margaret.

Jira is a mysterious woman said to have come from a distant land with Lena, and became the king of Aran's concubine. Lena was stolen from her as a baby when Ariana visited Aran, and she died shortly after from the loss. She was loved by many of Aran's citizens, and supposedly looked very similar to Ley.

Visal is Prince Siegfried's servant. He often allows Siegfried to do as he pleases, even if it puts him in danger. Under Lucien's request and with Siegfried's help, he rescued Michael from Eleanor before he could be tortured to death for his betrayal.

Sir Wolf is one of the twelve knights sworn to protect the Child of the Prophecy. When the other knights were hunted down and murdered under Eleanor's orders, he went into hiding. When Lucien and Eleanor's wedding was nearing, he helped Cid, Sean, and Nox infiltrate Sevia castle to stop the gladiator match. He is later approached by Michael to join forces with Lucien.

Brenna is Sharis' older sister, and the wife of Earl Auye. She was forced into the marriage, and was unhappy to the point of attempting suicide on more than one occasion. She gave birth to a son, and was rescued by Ley, Sharis, and Linua soon after.

== Volume list ==
No.	Title	Original release date	English release date
1	The First Fate	2002	2006-08-08; 9781598165098
1. "The Meeting"; 2. "Stupor"; 3. "Kiss of Death"
Lena Ha is a tough and beautiful captain of her high school's the kumdo team. She is very skilled at everything she does, but dislikes getting close to anyone. Her mother is a love-sick woman who can't move on from her one-sided love, and her father is the CEO of an important company who acts like Lena and her mother don't exist. When a boy named Hyun-Min Kang transfers to Lena's school and joins the kumdo team, her icy exterior begins to melt as the two draw closer. Lena's dormitory roommate, Hee-Soo Kwon, begins to feel jealous of their relationship and uses the dean of the school to dig up information on Hyun-Min. As Hyun-Min's mother becomes aware of the situation, she storms into Lena's school and forcefully drags Hyun-Min away. Lena then discovers that Hyun-Min is her half-brother; the son of her father, and his mother is the woman who continually torments Lena's mother. Hyun-Min's mother sends thugs after Lena, but with the help of the kumdo team, Lena fends them off. However, Hyun-Min is injured during the fight and ends up in a coma. In a fit of rage, his mother once again sends men after Lena. Lena's mother is killed, and Lena tries to escape. Hee-Soo, feeling terrible for causing so many problems, acts as a decoy and tells Lena to run away, but is killed before Lena can get far. Lena is then stabbed and left for dead in a river. Meanwhile, a young man named Cid stumbles across a large number of corpses, among which is his father, still alive, but fatally wounded. Cid's father instructs him to find and protect the mysterious Child of the Prophecy, and then dies. Cid buries him and promises he will find the Child.
2	The First Destiny	2002	2006-12-12; 9781598165104
4. "Scarlet Memory"; 5. "Pursuer"; 6. "First Meeting: Sean"
Nearly two weeks after she was stabbed, Lena wakes up to find herself in a small village named Billa, in Scotland during the middle ages. Under the care of a mysterious man named Gideon and his foster daughter, Maria, she heals from her wounds and takes on a new identity of a man named Ley. One day, the village is suddenly attacked by an army, and all of the girls with black hair are taken prisoner. Everyone else is killed, and the buildings are all burned. Ley, Gideon, Maria, and Anna, a woman from the village, manage to escape unscathed. Ley parts ways with the others and starts a journey to Glasgow to rescue the kidnapped girls. On the way, in the city of Scoan she meets the prince of Laud, a bumbling, childish teen named Sean Renock III who has run away from the castle and is looking for adventure. When Ley reluctantly saves Sean from a group of kidnappers, he begins to follow her and together they join a caravan of merchants who are heading for Glasgow. Before they can go far, the caravan is attacked by a group of thieves and everyone is taken prisoner, and trapped in a cave. Meanwhile in Ashton, the young king of Tamir, Lucien Wyclef, is preparing to take a leave of absence from the castle due to his suspicions that Earl Romer, a friend and ally, is in trouble.
3	The First Fortune	2003	2007-04-10; 9781598165111
7. "Cid"; 8. "Escape"; 9. "Second Meeting"
Cid is tracking down members of the Jager Tribe, assassins who are responsible for his father's death. Along the way, he meets Gideon who encourages Cid to keep searching for the Child. Trapped in the Cave of Death, Ley and the others discover that their captors are planning to sell them as slaves. Ley and a few of the men are taken to participate in a contest for the amusement of the slave traders. They are told to battle with one of the slave trader's "toys", a burly fighter. Two of the men are killed, but Ley manages to kill the fighter and escape into the depths of the cave. She eventually finds her way outside, but is attacked by Cid who assumes she is one of the Jager Tribe. When he discovers she isn't, he treats her wounds and asks if she will lead him back to the slave traders, among which were a few Jagers. Ley refuses and leaves, but soon returns under the excuse that she can't find her way back on her own. They both then enter the cave and make their way to where the captives are being held.
4	The First Epic	2003	2007-07-31; 9781598165128
10. "Confined in Darkness"; 11. "Toward Glasgow"; 12. "Third Meeting: Michael"
Cid and Ley manage to free the captives, but the slave traders and Jagers escape, setting off traps as they go; sealing off the cave and trapping everyone inside. Sean discovers a hidden exit and they manage to leave the cave, discovering the kidnappers escaping on a ship. They find a small boat floating nearby, and they use it to get back to shore. Willem, an old noble who was among the captives, gives Ley a small pouch and asks if she will deliver it to Earl Romero in Glasgow. In return, she asks him to keep her katana for her; the sword which was used to kill her mother. Ley, Sean, and Cid then leave for Glasgow. On the way, they stop in a small village and stay at a woman's house for the night. Ley attempts to take a bath while Cid and Sean sleep, but is hindered by a mysterious man already bathing in the river. She runs away after he asks her to wash his back for him, and the next morning, she leaves with Cid and Sean. Meanwhile, Yuriel, the leader of the Jager Tribe, is inspecting the girls from Billa who are suspected to be the Child of the Prophecy. When he discovers none of them bear the tell-tale mark, he tortures them for information on the "man", Ley, who escaped them. Ley, Cid, and Sean arrive in Glasgow soon after, and coincidentally meet the man Ley saw bathing, Michael. That night, they are asked by Max, the former captain of the guard, to go rescue Earl Romero who is being held hostage in the castle by his nephew, Chris. Joined by Michael, the four of them manage to infiltrate the castle under the guise of being mercenaries.
5	The First Augury	2003	2007-12-11; 9781598165135
13. "Grief"; 14. "Crossing Paths"; 15. "Pursuit"; 16. "Forest of Evil"
While Cid, Sean, and Michael look for Earl Romero, Ley finds Edith, one of the girls from Billa, in Glasgow Castle's dungeon. She attempts to rescue the injured girl, but is intercepted by Chris who kills Edith. Ley, enraged at her death, attacks Chris and injures his face. A man named Daniel steps in and stops her from killing Chris, and Michael rescues Ley. The two escape and are reunited with Cid and Sean who have Earl Romero in tow. The group is then surrounded by the castle soldiers and are attacked. Outside the castle, Max and the newly arrived Lucien stand watch and wait for the four's signal. Inside, Cid manages to get the gate open, allowing Max and Lucien to charge into the castle and join in the fight. Chris and Daniel escape, and the fighting eventually dies down. Ley leaves Glasgow alone without warning the other three, but they follow and catch up with her. Ley, not knowing that Lucien was at Glasgow, tells the others she wishes to meet the king of Tamir and they head for Ashton. Along the way, they are attacked several times not only by Jagers, but also ordinary citizens. One night, Ley has a dream of a man she's never met, but feels like she knows. The man gets pulled away from her by a mysterious shadow, and she abruptly wakes up. At the same time in Glasgow, Lucien wakes up screaming as if he had a nightmare, and wonders who the woman is that he saw in his dream. The next morning when Michael suggests they take a shortcut, the group enters the Forest of Evil and save two women who are being attacked. That night, they are ambushed by the same people who were trying to kidnap the women. Ley rushes forward when she sees that one of the men bears a striking resemblance to Hyun-Min.
6	The First Fate	2004	2008-04-01; 9781598165142
17. "Ominous Wind"; 18. "An Attack"; 19. "Yuriel"
Ley discovers that the man, Ian, who looks like Hyun-Min is not the same person. Ian takes the four into his custody and takes them to a small town in the forest where he gives them food and treats them much better than they had been expecting. However, one of Ian's men who is unsatisfied with the lifestyle Ian has provided for him, leaves the town, killing one of the look-out's along the way. In Cunak Castle, Daniel, Chris, and Yuriel are plotting their next move with the Earl Auye, the ruler of Cunak, to once again try to capture Ley. Under the Earl's orders, Yuriel goes to Allem Castle to find Linua, the Earl's runaway daughter; one of the women Ian had tried to kidnap in the forest. Shortly after Yuriel arrives, the man from the forest also shows up and gives away the location of Ian's town. Yuriel then attacks the town while the men are all bathing and kills almost all of the women and children who were there unprotected. Ley tries to run away, but gets shot in the back with an arrow. Cid and Sean return with the town's men, but arrive too late and discover only dead bodies and burning buildings. Michael finds Ley on the ground where she fell some ways from the town, and takes her elsewhere instead of finding the others.
7	The First Destiny	N/A	N/A
20. "Meeting the Leon Tribe"; 21. "The Start of the Battle"; 22. "The Battle of Rohim"
Michael reflects on his past when he was taken in by Eleanor. He considers killing Ley to avoid taking her to Kabul, but his love for her stops him. Instead, he treats her wound, and thus discovers her true gender. Ley later wakes up alone and gets attacked. She is saved by two members of the Leon Tribe, and leaves the forest. Meanwhile, Cid and Sean join forces with Ian and the town's other survivors. They find and kill the man who betrayed Ian, and then Cid and Sean leave for Ashton to find Ley. At Cunak, the Earl deploys his army and they head for Bilbow, destroying all the towns in their path. In Ashton, Lucien hears of their movement, and goes to meet the Earl's troops with his own. Before the Earl's troops reach Bilbow, they attack a small village called Rohim where Ley is staying. Ley helps the citizens fight back, and they win, killing Mark, the Earl's brother who was leading the troops.
8	Part 2 of the Battle	N/A	N/A
23. "Castle Bilbow"; 24. "Fourth Meeting: Sharis"; 25. "Into the Battlefield"; 26. "Lucien"
Ley leaves Rohim and heads for Bilbow where Lucien is staying. However, when she asks for an audience with him, he has her put in prison until he has time to see her. Outside the castle, a young girl named Sharis attempts to assassinate the Earl, but gets injured. She flees to the forest where she stumbles across Sean and Cid. They treat her wounds, and the battle begins at Bilbow. Ley manages to escape prison when the fighting starts, and she rushes out onto the battlefield to find Lucien. She saves him as he is almost killed, and they both recognize each other from the dream they had shared. As Lucien's troops begin their retreat back to the castle, Lucien tries to take Ley with him, but they get separated. Cid rides onto the field on a horse and he takes Ley to the castle where they both get hired as mercenaries. Michael arrives soon after, and Lucien questions him about Ley, and is disappointed to hear that Ley is a man, apparently not the woman from his dream. Soon after, the Earl orders his army into retreat when he receives a letter from queen Eleanor to whom Lucien is engaged. Lucien then orders Ley to guard him on the way to Sevia where his wedding will take place.
9	Part 2 of the Battle	N/A	N/A
27. "Dangerous Journey"; 28. "To Kabul"; 29. "Journey Just for Two"
Ley and the others leave for Sevia, with Sharis accompanying as well. They are attacked several times, and decide to take a chance by trespassing on the Leon Tribe's territory. They get drugged and kidnapped by Leons, and Ley and Lucien are separated from the others and left somewhere in the wilderness, while everyone else is taken to a Leon castle. Meanwhile, Demitri, the Earl's other brother, kills everyone in Rohim while looking for Ley. Yuriel also goes to visit Kal, Sean's half-brother who has taken over Laud, and tells him the Earl wants him to marry Linua. The Shine of the Leon Tribe eventually sets the group free, but rather than taking them back outside, they are drugged and nearly kill each other. Sean, who is mysteriously unaffected by the Leon's drugs, stops them, and they manage to leave safely. Ley and Lucien both find themselves surrounded by wolves in an unknown place. They defeat the wolves and go to find shelter for the night. They eventually find a village to stay in. However, it is run by thieves, and Lucien gets poisoned. Ley manages to get them both to safety, and forces Lucien to throw up the poison, thus saving his life. They then continue on their way to Sevia.
10	Part 2	N/A	N/A
30. "At the Cabin"; 31. "Goodbye"; 32. "Meeting Queen Eleanor"
Max is captured and tortured by the queen after he discovers her plans to behead Lucien on their wedding day. Meanwhile, Lucien and Ley are still wandering around in the wilderness. They finally reach the Yuca River, and take a boat to Sevia. The rest of their group arrives in Sevia ahead of them, and they stay at an inn. Michael leaves them there and heads to the castle where he gives a report to Queen Eleanor, resulting in the arrests of Cid, Sean, Sharis, and Nox. They are then tortured for information. When Ley and Lucien arrive, they are taken straight to the castle where they meet Eleanor. She provides them both with baths and fresh clothing. The next day, they have dinner with Eleanor and she drugs Ley, and has her put in a room for one of the visiting nobles to have his way with her. Before the man can arrive, Michael pushes Ley into a hidden trap door and takes her place. Ley, woken up from the fall, wanders around in the tunnel she landed in, and eventually finds her way out, into the room of Prince Siegfried who is visiting from Aran. Thinking the queen sent her there for his amusement, he attempts to rape her, but Lucien bursts into the room and stops him before anything happens. When Eleanor discovers that Ley had escaped from the room she'd put her in, she sends Yan, one of her servants, to capture Ley.
11	Part 2: War	N/A	N/A
33. "Under the Moonlight"; 34. "Trapped in the Darkness"; 35. "The Other Side of Memory"; 36. "Sword Fight"
Ley spots Yuriel going into the queen's chambers, and nearly gets caught by her guards, but is helped by Prince Siegfried and manages to escape. Siegfried asks her if she's ever heard of "Jira" and looks disappointed when Ley says no. She returns to Lucien's bedchambers, and he angrily pulls her inside and asks where she's been, apparently thinking she was sleeping with one of the maids. He kisses her, but apologizes directly after, feeling angry with himself for falling in love with Ley (who he still thinks is a man) when he already has Eleanor. Ley leaves his room and reminds herself that Hyun-Min is waiting, and denies she has any feelings for Lucien. Moments later, she is captured by Yan. Meanwhile, Cid, Sean, and Nox are busy working in a mine. A man named Sir Wolf who knew Cid's father approaches them in their cell and offers to help them escape, which they agree to. Ley is transported to an underground dungeon where she is reunited with Max and Sharis. The next day, Lucien begins to wonder where Ley went. Eleanor reassures him that Ley is probably exploring the city, and drugs Lucien's tea. The drug causes him to forget all about Ley until Michael forces him to remember, and tells Lucien that she's in trouble. Cid, Nox, and Sean disguise themselves as guards to infiltrate Sevia Castle with Sir Wolf and his troops during the wedding celebrations. Michael prepares to rescue Ley from the dungeon, but is hindered by Eleanor's request to have him as her personal body guard. Yuriel plans to leave Sevia with the other Jagers to join forces with the Earl while Eleanor is occupied with her wedding. Ley, Sharis, and Max, as well as Eleanor's other prisoners, are all required to take part in the celebrations; a gladiator match. With the revealing outfit Ley is forced to wear, her gender is revealed to everyone as she steps into the arena with the rest of the prisoners.
12	Part 2: Betrayal	2008-12-30; 978-89-252-3866-1	N/A
37. "Betrayal"; 38. "Before the Edge of Death"; 39. "Attack of the Rebels"; 40. "Reunion"
As the gladiator match starts, Ley faints and has a vision of her mother who then turns into Ariana, and leads her into a cave where Ley sees Maron. Maron exclaims happily that Ley is alive, and calls her "the child". Ley then wakes up and begins to fight. Sharis points out Lucien and Michael who are both beside the queen in her box overlooking the arena. Cid, who is watching from the stands with Sean and Nox, rushes out of the stands to try to stop the tournament. Cid tries to enter the queen's box, but is stopped by her guards and Michael, much to Cid's shock. When he asks Michael if he is the one who betrayed them, Michael pretends to not know him and returns to Eleanor's side. Back in the arena, Ley and the others win the fight, though Max was severely injured in the process. She asks Eleanor to set them free, as Eleanor had promised prior to the match. Eleanor agrees, and has archers shoot at them saying she didn't agree to let them live. Lucien tries to stop her, but she has him restrained. The troops brought by Sir Wolf begin to fight Eleanor's soldiers, and allows Lucien a chance to escape. Ley and the others hide behind corpses to avoid being shot, and Ley has Sharis shoot an arrow at Eleanor to cause a distraction to allow them time to escape, but Michael shields Eleanor, and takes the arrow in her stead. Yuriel attacks Lucien and tells him Eleanor and the Earl's real motives for having him marry her. Prince Siegfried rescues Lucien, Yuriel gets injured, but manages to escape. Lucien and Michael kill the guards at the arena gates, and Michael makes Lucien promise that he won't tell Ley that Michael helped. Lucien opens the arena gates, and everyone escapes. The other prisoners decide to stay behind and fight, while Ley and her friends leave on Prince Siegfried's ship. Michael, who was left behind, is captured by Eleanor for helping everyone escape.
13	Part 2: War	2009-05-30; 978-89-252-4555-3	N/A
41. "Long Night, Longer Day"; 42. "Ariana"; 43. "Gathering People"
Michael is continually tortured by Eleanor as she searches for Ley's whereabouts. Yuriel, Ethelle, and Camiel return to the room where the Jager are staying in the castle and discover that everyone had been murdered by Eleanor's guards. Daniel arrives as they get attacked by guards, and helps them escape to Laud where Kal tends to their injuries. Ley and the others are sailing away from Sevia. Lucien tells Ley of his childhood and his relationship with the Earl. He asks Ley why she'd been pretending to be a man the whole time, but Sharis calls for her and she leaves his question unanswered. The next day, they discuss what their next course of action should be. Sean finally learns of his parents' confinement and Kal's seizing of the throne. Lucien once again confronts Ley and asks why she lied and protected him. She tells him it was to return home and he gets angry and demands to know if there is someone waiting for her. She says yes and he kisses her, and offers her the position of queen. When she refuses, he offers her himself. She refuses again and he leaves, laughing. Shortly after, Visal asks Ley is she's heard of "Jira", just as Prince Siegfried did. She once again says no, and Visal tells her who Jira was, and also gives her information on the Leon Tribe. As they're talking, Eleanor's guards approach in boats to inspect the ship while Siegfried isn't on board. Everyone hides under the deck, but they discover Sean isn't with them. Ley looks for him and they nearly get caught by a guard, but Ley jumps at him and pushes him overboard, falling into the water as well. Ley sees Ariana's ghost, and she once more takes her to the cave where Maron is. Maron tells her about Ariana and Eleanor's pasts, and what Ley's role is. Maron then gives Ley the jewel from her forehead and begs for forgiveness as Ley is dragged back into the water. Lucien jumps overboard and swims down to get Ley. He returns to the deck of the ship and performs mouth-to-mouth resuscitation on Ley until she begins to breathe again. Prince Siegfried returns to the boat and reveals that Eleanor is wildly searching for them. Ley tells everyone she is leaving to go find the Leons to get their help for the upcoming battles. Siegfried decides to stay and hinder Eleanor's armies, Lucien decides to return to Ashton, and Sean decides to go to Laud with Cid and Sharis to stop Kal. Meanwhile, Ian and his friends attack a caravan on the border of Laud that Linua is in, once again attempting to kidnap her. Sean, Cid, and Sharis arrive in Laud and unite with Sean's old tutor. Siegfried and Visal, under Lucien's request, save Michael from Eleanor's torture chamber. Ley and the two bodyguards Siegfried forced her to take arrive on Leon land, and they are immediately intercepted by Leons. Ley meets with the Shine, and he agrees to take her to their main castle.
14	Part 2: War	2009-09-30; 978-89-252-5096-0	N/A
44. "Dance Under the Moonlight"; 45. "The Truth"; 46. "Kidnap"
Shine leads Ley through the underground path to the Leon's main castle as Lucien and Nox return to Ashton. The Earl and Demitri decide to gather their armies to attack Lucien. Ley and Shine arrive at the castle, but her request for an audience with their tribe leader is rejected. Shine tells her to go back to Sevia, but she refuses. When Ley tells Shine Maron sent her, he tells her more of Ariana's past, and then agrees to take her to the tribe leader. When Ley meets the leader, he supplies more information about the past and of the Leon Tribe, and reveals to Ley that Ariana was able to open other dimensions, and has passed that ability to Eleanor, though her powers haven't awakened. Michael wakes up in Siegfried's custody and Siegfried asks him to contact Sir Wolf and ask to join forces. Ian, his friends, and Linua join Sean in Laud and they infiltrate Scoan castle under the guise that Linua is going to meet with Kal to prepare for their wedding. When Kal attempts to convince her to marry him that very night, Ian steps in and claims Linua is his wife. A fight breaks out between Sean and Kal's troops, and Camiel manages to kidnap Linua before Sean can get to them. Sean reveals himself to Kal and imprisons him while his parents are released from their captivity. Ian is found a short while later unconscious on the floor, and Sharis and Linua are gone.
15	Part 2: War	2009-12-30; 978-89-252-5553-8	N/A
47. "Moonless Night"; 48. "The Second War"; 49. "At Cunak Castle"; 50. "A Sudden Attack"
Michael approaches Sir Wolf to gain his help in the upcoming battles as Cid and Sean travel with Ian to rescue Sharis and Linua from the Earl. They stumble across a caravan of people getting attacked by the Earl's men, and save them. Gideon and Maria are part of the group. Meanwhile, Lucien is leading his army in pursuit of the Earl's troops, reclaiming many cities along the way. He then engages Demitri's army in battle. On her way to Sevia, Ley decides to visit Rohim, but discovers that it has been destroyed by Demitri. In Cunak, Sharis and Linua plan to rescue Sharis' sister, Brenna. Camiel questions Adam, the Earl's servant, about Brenna's location. The three find Brenna, and try to leave with her, but she reveals that she is pregnant and can't leave. Adam discovers them in Brenna's room, and attacks them. They manage to escape, and reunite with Sean and the others outside of the castle. Cid tries to send warning to Lucien after they see a large number of Jagers heading for the battle, but his eagle is shot down by one of Yuriel's men. The Jagers attack Lucien's army's camp, and they manage to murder several generals in their sleep, but Lucien manages to avoid injury. Afterward, Demitri begins attacking them during the day, and Yuriel at night. Lucien calls for retreat after his army suffers massive damage, but Yuriel and Demitri follow him, destroying everything in their path. Lucien decides to confront the enemy head-on, and as the battle begins to take a turn for the worse, Ley arrives with the Leon army and they easily win the battle.
16	Part 3: Life and Death	2010-3-31; 978-89-252-5888-1	N/A
51. "Retreat"; 52. "Toward Cunak"
Lucien's army, joined by the forces of Laud, Aran, and Leon, manages to beat back Demitri's army, but as he retreats to Cunak, he once again spreads death and destruction in his wake. Lucien asks Ley why she returned, and she tells him it isn't for him, but only because she is chasing Demitri to get revenge for Rohim. As they approach Cunak, Ley volunteers to ride ahead as a scout. She, and several Leons who accompanied her, stumble across Sean and the others who are getting attacked by Demitri. Ley tries to kill Demitri, but Cid stops her when she nearly gets shot by archers. Demitri takes Linua and retreats and destroys a bridge, forcing the others to take the round-about route to Cunak. Gideon asks Ley if she still wants to go home, and Ley tells him she doesn't know anymore. At Cunak, the Earl punishes Demitri for allowing the Leons to overpower his army, and tells them that the Leons are nothing to be feared. Yuriel decides to leave the Earl and return to Eleanor with a "present". Lucien and everyone else arrive outside Cunak Castle, and they prepare to battle once more as the Earl's army comes out of the gates. However, Lucien orders a retreat when he discovers the "army" is actually made up of hostages whom the Earl took from the surrounding villages. Ley, Sean, Cid, Sharis, and Camiel all infiltrate the castle through a hidden passage. They manage to get into Brenna's room, and discover Linua there. Brenna goes into labor, and Ley leads everyone toward the gates, and releases all of the hostages the Earl had been holding captive inside the castle. The Earl attempts to fight against the surprise attack Lucien launched, but he is defeated and retreats into the castle once more. He rushes to Brenna's room to take her and escape, and discovers she has given birth to a son. When he tries to take her with him, she stabs him in the neck and says she hates him. As he collapses, Lucien and Sharis burst into the room. The Earl stabs Lucien. At the same time elsewhere in the castle, Ley collapses and is taken by Yuriel.
17	Part 3: Life and Death	2010-7-30; 978-89-252-6510-0	N/A
53. "Kidnapped Ley"; 54. "Truth of the Past"; 55. "The Last Duel"
Lucien manages to kill the Earl at long last, but collapses directly after from his own wounds. Everyone searches the battlefield for Ley, but she is nowhere to be found. When Lucien wakes up later, he asks why Ley isn't there. Camiel tells everyone that Yuriel is taking her back to Sevia. Everyone prepares to leave to rescue her, and Willem gives Lucien Ley's katana, telling Lucien she isn't from this world and that he must let her go when the time comes. Eleanor drugs Ley so she becomes an obedient "doll". Rumors are started that the Child of the Prophecy has joined forces with the Queen, and distrust starts to spread through Sir Wolf's forces. Michael is reunited with the others, and they make plans to infiltrate Sevia Castle to rescue Ley and attack Eleanor. Ley faints from an overdose of the drug and sees a glimpse of the past of when Ariana stole the baby Lena from Jira during a party to celebrate Lena's birth and took her back to Kabul. Shortly after, Eleanor branded Lena and Ariana took her and ran away. Eleanor then pushed them both into the Yume River, and Ariana sent Lena to present-day Korea where Lena's mother found her. Michael kisses Ley to bring her out of her drug-induced state, ending the flashback. They send a signal to Lucien and the others outside the castle, and the armies attack. Michael returns Hyun-Min's necklace to Ley, and proceeds to fight with Eleanor's guard. Ley confronts Eleanor, and kills Yuriel and Chris in the process. Eleanor then runs out of the castle, and Ley corners her by the river. Eleanor is killed by Ariana, and Ley is sent back to Korea. She briefly talks to her father, and tells him she no longer hates him. Afterward, she visits Hyun-Min in the hospital, discovering that he is catatonic and doesn't recognize her. She returns his necklace, and says goodbye to him before returning to Scotland for good where she is reunited with Lucien and everyone else, and she knows that she is finally where she belongs.
