= Moon Boy (manhwa) =

Manhwa series by Lee Young-yoo

- The Yen Press edition of the first volume featuring Myung-Ee (top-left) and Yu-Da (bottom-right).

월요일 소년 Woryoil sonyeon
- Genre: Action/adventure, comic fantasy, romantic comedy, romantic fantasy
- Author: Lee Young-you
- Publisher: (South Korea) Haksanpub
- English publisher: (United States) ICEkunion, Yen Press
- Other publishers: (Germany) EMA (France) Saphira
- Magazine: Party
- Original run: 2005–2009
- Collected volumes: 9

Moon Boy (Korean: 月요일 소년) is a Korean manhwa created by Korean author Lee Young-you. The series, as of June 2009 (July '09 Party issue), is completed in Korea. It is complete with nine volumes. Nine of them have been translated and released in the United States and other parts of the world. It is translated into English by Yen Press, license absorbed from ICEkunion following the latter's dissolution.

== Plot ==
Five years before the story begins, a fifth grade girl named Myung-Ee Joo is on her way to school when she accidentally bumps into a classmate, a boy named Yu-Da Lee. Yu-Da and Myung-Ee both have an instant dislike of each other but they have one thing in common; eyes that turn red at night when the moon's out.

Later, Myung-Ee is asked out on a date by a tenth-grader and is annoyed at Yu-Da for his suspicions that the older boy wished to take advantage of her. This resulted in a conflict where she challenged Yu-Da to a fight after school. Yu-Da's suspicions of the tenth grader turned out to be correct. After school the older boy reveals himself to be a Fox who craves "Earth Rabbit Meat," this being Yu-Da and Myung-Ee.

Luckily, Yu-Da is saved by an unknown boy and faints. Myung-Ee, not knowing of what had happened, is left still waiting for Yu-Da thinking she has been stood up and resolves to never talk to him again. On the following day however, Yu-Da does not show up for class and no one in class remembers him. No one in the entire school except for Myung-Ee.

Five years later, Myung-Ee transfers to a school in a new city but is shocked to see Yu-Da among the student council with no recollection of her or ever living in the city where they both went to school together. Yu-Da's school council friends prevent Myung-Ee from speaking with Yu-Da for long and one member, Sa-Eun, tries to attack her in her home to wipe her memories of ever meeting Yu-Da. She is rescued by Ho-Rang a fellow student at her new school.

She soon finds out that she is an "Earth Rabbit". A descendant of the Rabbit people who came from the Moon. The school council members guarding Yu-Da are Foxes who hunt the Rabbits for their flesh. Yu-Da is the "black rabbit" whose liver is said to have special immortality powers. Since his disappearance, Yu-Da was imprisoned by the Foxes and put under a memory spell to forget his childhood. He is guarded by the Foxes until he matures and his liver is harvested.

Mung-Ee decides she wants to save Yu-Da's life with the help of fellow Rabbit Ho-Rang even if it means being targeted by the powerful Foxes guarding him.

== Characters ==
=== Main characters ===
Yu-Da Lee
The main protagonist of the story, though he does not seem like it much. Yu-Da was raised by his kind grandpa who was killed by Foxes when he was in the fifth grade. He was outcast a little bit by his peers because of his background of having no parents and living in a poor part of the city. Even Myung-Ee made his life difficult by getting angry at him. His fifth grade personality was somewhat serious. He's known to be kind, not snobby, but he teased Myung-Ee on her hair and her rabbit print underwear.

Five years later, he's the Secretary of Chun-Ah High School's student council. His personality is completely opposite of what he was five years ago. He smiles a lot, wears glasses, has an unusual talisman on his hair, and is extremely kind. Can be considered the peace maker among the student council. He is living with Se-Eun because he is the "black rabbit". His liver has special powers that can grant the Fox, who devours the liver, an immortal life. So, he has to be protected by the student council, which consist of all Foxes. In order for the Foxes to watch Yu-Da, his memory had to be altered so he doesn't remember anything from five years ago.

When Yu-Da's glasses come off by either some kind of force or any other way, he becomes a completely different person known as "Black" Yu-Da. He wears his school uniform unbuttoned and loose. His expression is very cold, calculating, and very confident. Also, his "black rabbit" power is super strong at this point. He can hit Foxes without touching them. He does not even need a Ho-Se sword. Another ability he can do is erase/alter people's memories. He realizes that Myung-Ee really cares for him after her punch, and tells her not to hang out with Sa-Eun to get attention, yet she does not know what he means.

Myung-Ee Joo
The main heroine of the story. A tenth grader who is super boy crazy and loves taking pictures of boys with her camera phone. She thought her life was pretty much normal with an exception that her eyes turn red whenever it's night time. She can be pretty loud and a bit obnoxious, but in truth, she really does care about other people and feels friendship is an important trait to have. Overall, she can be very brave and determined when fighting against the Foxes. Her "courage" gives her strength in certain situations. It is revealed that in her past life, she was the greatest female warrior of the rabbit tribe. She befriended Hang-Ah, but she had to kill two of her fox companions on the king's order. In her past life, she had died from the foxes while defending rabbits escaping to Earth during the attack of the foxes.

Ho-Rang Jin
A serious but also whimsical twelfth grade boy. He is a very honorable heroic person. His family background is that of a noble family. Ho-Rang ran away from home when he was just seven years old because he didn't want to cause his grandfather any trouble concerning the Soon-La army. After vigorous training, Ho-Rang ended up being a Mo-Dal, which is the top rank for being in the Soon-La army. His fighting skills are very good and many Rabbit people in Junghyun Mountain admire him just for being strong. When he first met Myung-Ee, he dressed himself up in a super-hero costume calling himself Taekwon V. At his side is his talking cat, Ya-Ho. At school, he is the president of the kendo club which only had two members until Myung-Ee came along. Ho-Rang also accidentally saw Myung-Ee's "bumbum", and since he's such an honorable person, he made Myung-Ee his future wife. When it comes to meeting the student council, Ho-Rang has a small grudge against Sa-Eun and will sometimes challenge him to a fight.Ho-Rang once fought Sa-Eun in order to restore Myung-Ee's "honor" and found out that he likes her when he got hurt.

Sa-Eun Won
The Treasurer for the student council. He's an unusual case of being an elite Fox. He was brought to the Bon-Ga at the age of 10 unlike other Foxes who were born at the Bon-Ga. Sa-Eun is also the one responsible for finding Yu-Da and taking care of him. His personality is rather stern but he does crack a smirk/grin here and there. He takes his guardian duty seriously over Yu-Da since they live in the same house. His powers are considerably strong too since he's an elite Fox. He can wield a sword quite well, use some magic, and isn't afraid of crashing into people's apartments. Sa-Eun is a smoker so along with his cigarette comes a perverted imprisoned smokey soul named Moky-Moky. He starts to like Myung-Ee because she wasn't afraid of him. He does not want to give up on her even if she's still after Yu-Da.

=== Secondary characters ===
Ya-Ho
She is Ho-Rang's talking cat. When it's school time, she changes into a human in order to spy for Ho-Rang. Ya-Ho is the first friend that Myung-Ee meets in Chun-Ah High. At first, she couldn't speak really well. Then, she could only move her mouth to make out words. Finally, with Myung-Ee's small advice, Ya-Ho was able to speak using her voice. She can't speak human well so her words are choppy. Despite that, what she says can come out really funny. Ya-Ho acts sometimes like a mentor towards both Myung-Ee and Ho-Rang when she lectures them.

During a confrontation between Hee-Ju and Ha-Eun, Ya-Ho is severely injured by the stray foxes and is taken into He-Eun's care. When Myung-Ee goes to see Ha-Eun, Ya-Ho has no memory of her.

Chi-In Shin
He is the student council President and a classmate in Ho-Rang's class. Correction, the "sick" student council president. He's always sick because he refuses to drink Rabbit blood. He seems to disagree with the way he and the other foxes plan on using Yu-da in the future and considers him a friend, even going so far as to start crying when confronted by it from Myung-Ee. Without Rabbit blood, he's very weak so the Vice-President has been always watching over him. Chi-In doesn't like Ho-Rang that much and wishes to see Ho-Rang's kendo club to be officially closed.

It is revealed in volume 6 that Chi-In is in contact with Ha-Eun and his ideals. During the attack in volume 8, Ha-Eun takes over his body after Sun-Ok's becomes of no use to him.
Jin-Soo Jung
She is the feisty student council's Vice-President in leopard patterned boots. Jin-Soo, in eleventh grade, loves to see everything kept in order and would constantly check to make sure of that. She's also the one who would usually report things to and from the Bon-Ga elders. Jin-Soo cares greatly about Chi-In's health and has been taking care of him since their Bon-Ga days. Sa-Eun can sometimes say something that sets off Jin-Soo's anger, which causes Jin-Soo to beat up Sa-Eun. Jin-Soo's damage to Sa-Eun is pretty severe so it's best to never ever cross paths with her when she's in that state. Even Yu-Da's "shiny face attack" doesn't work on pacifying Jin-Soo's anger.

Mok-Hee Kum (Moky-Moky)
The smoke spirit that hangs around in Sa-Eun's cigarettes who likes girls a lot. He speaks in a perverted tone. Actually, he's not really a spirit. He's a Fox who was banished to become smoke and was entrusted in Sa-Eun's care because of a lot of bad mistakes that he committed in the past. He is good with magic and not really much of a fighter, but he dodges attacks quite easily. When drinking Earth Rabbit blood, he doesn't take a lot because he considers himself one of the more "gentle" Foxes. Mok-Hee seems to appear more for the comedy relief but behind his cutesy smile, there's always some sort of ulterior plan that he's bound to pull off.

Ga-Woo Yang
The cross-dresser of the story. He owns a clothing store in Junghyun Mountain and loves dressing himself in dresses of all sorts. His power and strength is only second to that of Ho-Rang. Back when he and Ho-Rang were kids, Ho-Rang accidentally asked Ga-Woo to go out with him because he thought Ga-Woo was a girl. Now, he likes to call Ho-Rang his "fiance" just for kicks. Ga-Woo helps Myung-Ee train to become a part of the Soon-La army. He seems to always know more than what he says or does.

Hee-Ju Lim
The boy with the mafia hair-do as Myung-Ee usually refers to him as. He first meets Myung-Ee in Junghyun Mountain and finds a hard time accepting her as a true Rabbit fit for the Soon-La army. When both of them get stuck in a high level training simulator, Hee-Ju learns the importance of friendship and decides to respect Myung-Ee. He acts tough because he wants to be the best warrior in the army but his heart has a soft-side for his friends. He later appears again in an older form of himself in order to pass off as a high school student.
Soon after Sun-Ok is taken over, Hee-Ju goes back to Junghyun Mountain feeling as though he failed.

=== Supporting characters ===
Fan-Sy-Cou
Their full name is "Fans of Sa-Eun and Yu-Da Couple". They are three insane crazy girls who support a yaoi couple of Sa-Eun and Yu-Da. When they say their club motto, they do it in a Charlie Angels style. They were asked by Seo-Wha to do something horrible to Myung-Ee so they stole her underwear and pinned it across from the student council room.

Seo-Wha
Even though she appeared at the end of volume one, most of volume two, and the beginning of volume three, she doesn't seem like the type who would come back again after her "incident" with Yu-Da. A Fox who has a bad childhood. As a kid in Bon-Ga, she grew up being disliked by many of the other Fox children and adults alike. This is due to her habit of eating just about anything. She'll eat a cute innocent kitten. She'll eat a bird. Seo-Wha only knows how to cast small spells on Earth Rabbits, which are considered "pitiful" by the Fox Tribe.

She was subjugated to bullying until Sa-Eun came along telling the other kids to bug off. Seo-Wha realized that while she's with Sa-Eun, she won't get bullied. Now in high school, Seo-Wha is still attached to Sa-Eun. She grew jealous of both Myung-Ee and Yu-Da for being so close to Sa-Eun. She hates Yu-Da above all for being a Rabbit and living with Sa-Eun. Seo-Wha couldn't accept the fact that the "prey" is living with the foxes. When Seo-Wha got injured in a fight against Ho-Rang and Myung-Ee, she came across Yu-Da. She whacked Yu-Da's comforting hand away from her in anger causing Yu-Da's glasses to fall off. It was then that "Black" Yu-Da woke up and made sure that she wouldn't make another anger rant again.

Ah-Ri and Min-Soo
Best friends of Hee-Ju who were possessed by Foxes in the training simulator in Junghyun Mountain.

Myung-Ee's Teacher
The teacher of Myung-Ee's class appears in the form of a tiger with an Olympic medal on his/her chest. He/She can be very fierce but great for comedy relief.

Yu-Da's Grandpa
A very gentle and kind grandfather who was the only remaining family member left of Yu-Da's. He appears only in the first volume and some flashbacks later on. He walks around with a walking stick and wears glasses. Myung-Ee saw him briefly. At first, she thought he was a kind old man until he started to joke around, which Myung-Ee took whatever he said, personally. He died in the hands of Foxes. "Black" Yu-Da, to this very day, can't forgive the Foxes for killing his grandpa.

Elders
From both Rabbit and Fox sides, there are going to be these so-called "Elders". Old people who have the highest authority over their respective sides. They've been mentioned several times.

Sun-Ok
A human girl who Hee-Ju meets during the culture festival. He saves her from when low level foxes attack, but ends up getting possessed by the spirit of Ha-Eun. In volume 8, her body is discarded by Ha-Eun after it becomes too damaged.

=== Antagonists ===
Ha-Eun
A noble being in the Moon Palace. In order to live on earth, he must possess one's body. He calls them 'sacrifices' or 'tools', though he is very thankful for them.
In the past, Ha-Eun was the White Rabbit on the moon. He invited Hang-Ah to the moon and made her immortal without telling her. When she discovers the truth, she is thrown into a depression. Hang-Ah begins to slowly lose her sanity and soon begins attacking those in the palace. Ha-Eun disappeared.

Yumei
A Low-Level fox taken in by Ha-Eun. She has no facial expressions, as a side effect of taking restoration medicine. In volume 8, it is revealed that she likes Yu-Da.

== Terminology ==
Bon-Ga
The place where high level Foxes get to live and play away from human contact. The elite group of Foxes are chosen here and one of their missions is to keep the Black Rabbit from being rescued.

Earth Rabbit
Rabbits who fled to the Earth from the Moon in order to escape the Fox invasion. Upon living on Earth for many years, many of them have lost their identity and became more like humans. The only difference that set them apart from the humans are their eyes that turn red when it's night. If any Earth Rabbit comes to Junghyun Mountain, their eyes turn red in an instant.

Foxes' Sword
Some Foxes uses their long claws as defense weapons but the highly trained Foxes don't use their claws. Like Sa-Eun, there are foxes that use swords that's made out of their claws.

Fox Tribe
Creatures from who knows where. When there was no more Rabbits on the Moon, they followed the Rabbits to Earth. They assumed human form and made their own little community which is Bon-Ga. There are two different types of foxes.

1. High Level Foxes: Are the elite ones chosen to have a good education mentally and physically so they can live among humans and be able to defend themselves against the Soon-La army. They are chosen right away from birth so they don't even know who their real parents are.
2. Low Level Foxes: Are the Foxes who aren't capable of controlling themselves. They seem to act almost zombie/animalistic. They are always hungry for Rabbit blood and meat they have already attacked humans. Very dangerous people.

Ho-Se Sword
A sword that can be formed upon will by a Rabbit. Depending on the wielder's control, the sword will take the shape of whatever the wielder desires of it.

Hun-Choo-Oak
A special talisman that acts like a tracking device for the Foxes.

Junghyun Mountain
The place where Rabbits, who don't want to live among humans, stay. The gravity in the area is equivalent to the Moon's gravity so no human is even able to survive being there.

Mung-Guh-Wan
A special pill that's used for altering memories.

Mung-Guh-Yeon
Used for mass wide manipulation/altering that only works on humans.

Rabbit Tribe
The same as Earth Rabbits except, these Rabbits are the ones who are able to preserve their sense of identity by building a hidden community underneath Earth's surface called Junghyun Mountain. They don't live among humans, except when they're on missions. When they are in Junghyun Mountain, not only do their eyes turn red but also, their rabbit ears come out as well.

Soon-La Army
The elite group of Rabbits chosen to help fight and defend themselves and each other against Foxes. A part of their mission is to rescue the Black Rabbit from the Foxes. Just like the high level Foxes, those chosen to be in the army are usually picked from birth and have never once met their parents.
