= Ciel (manhwa) =

Korean manhwa written by Rhim Ju-yeon

^씨엘
- Genre: Romantic fantasy
- Author: Rhim Ju-yeon
- Publisher: (South Korea) Daiwon C.I. Inc.
- English publisher: (United States) Tokyopop
- Other publishers: (Germany) Tokyopop
- Magazine: (South Korea) Issue
- Original run: 2005–2013
- Collected volumes: 23

Ciel: The Last Autumn Story (씨엘) is a fantasy Korean manhwa written by Rhim Ju-yeon. It began serialization in 2005 in Daiwon C.I. Issue manhwa magazine. The first bound volume was released in December 2005 in South Korea; as of 2013, twenty-two volumes have been released, and it is planned to end at twenty-three. It follows a young girl named Yvien Magnolia as she escapes her hometown and enrolls in the prestigious Lowood Institution for Witches and Wizards. The manhwa has been licensed for release in German by Tokyopop under the title Ciel - Der letzte Herbst. Tokyopop licensed the manhwa to be released in English; however, it became postponed in 2008 along with many other Tokyopop releases.

== Plot ==
With the author's characteristic humor and creativity, the work describes one girl’s fantasy adventure.

Yvienne Magnolia lives in a small village and her beauty turns the villagers' heads, yet she would never have imagined the grand future destined for her.

Because a count tries to kidnap her, Yvienne flees to the Lowood Institution for wizardry and witchcraft, forced to leave her family.

In the school, she meets interesting people, like January Lightsphere who comes from a noble but peculiar family, or Lariatte, an heir to an orthodox fighter family, who might yet become her closest friend.

== Characters ==
Yvienne Magnolia

A beautiful girl from a small village who was forced to run away to Lowood after rejecting a local aristocrat's son and earning the family's wrath. Yvienne met January Lightsphere in the train to Newton, and later at the school, Lariatte Kingdiamond, who would become her familiar. Throughout the story, she feels a deep emptiness inside her and struggles with understanding her purpose in life. Her love interest is Krohiten, who is her teacher as well as her father's. Her field's element is the sky; time travel.

Lariatte KingDiamond

A descendant of a family famous for their martial arts abilities. She becomes Yvienne's familiar after she saves her from life-threatening situation, and their relationship gives Yvienne a reason to live. Her field's element is water; dimension travel.

January Lightsphere

A young duke from the Lightsphere family; a line of aristocrats with a dark history and even darker secrets. He meets Yvienne in the train to Newton, and they become very close friends. His magic is unknown as he repeatedly refused to take magic lessons.

Daughter

A former student at who lives at Lowood as Krohiten's aide and January's roommate. He's lived at Lowood since he was ten years old, and while he keeps his own past is kept private, he has a reputation for being nosy on campus. His magic power is 'Close', which enables him to close doors and such from long distances away, and seal off areas from magic.

Krohiten

A professor at the academy, and the Arc Dragon of the Heavens. He is notoriously lazy and miserly, giving his aide, Daughter, a lot of trouble. His late wife is Carola Everett, Marion Everett's daughter from 300 years ago.
