= Kill Me, Kiss Me =

Korean manhwa series

- Cover of the Tokyopop edition of Kill Me, Kiss Me vol. 1 (2004), art by Lee Young-you

K2 -케이투- RR: K2 -keitu- MR: K2 -k'eit'u-
- Genre: Romantic comedy, Drama, Serio-comic, Contemporary romance
- Author: Lee Young-you
- Publisher: (South Korea) Daiwon C.I.
- English publisher: (Australia) (New Zealand) Madman Entertainment (Canada) (United States) Tokyopop
- Other publishers: (France) Saphira (Spain) La Cúpula (Sweden) B. Wahlströms (Finland) Punainen jättiläinen
- Magazine: (South Korea) Monthly Issue
- Original run: 2000–2002
- Collected volumes: 5

Kill Me, Kiss Me (Korean: K2 -케이투-) is a Korean high school romantic-comedy manhwa originally created by Korean author Lee Young-you revolving around two identical cousins of different gender who end up switching places for about one week's time. K2 was first released in Korea published by Daiwon C.I. with the first volume on December 22, 2000, and later formed a total of five individual volumes by May 29, 2002. The manhwa volumes were distributed in English by Tokyopop between February 2004 and February 2005. Tokyopop radically redesigned the covers of the volumes from how they appeared in the Korean version. Kill Me, Kiss Me is published by Egmont Manga & Anime in Germany.

== Plot ==
Kill Me, Kiss Me is a story with two separate but loosely connected plots. The first, spanning only the first volume of the manhwa, centers around the high school girl Tae Yeon Im and her obsession over a handsome model named Kun Kang. Tae finds out that Kun goes to the same school as her cousin Jung-Woo Im, to whom she is almost identical in appearance. She makes a deal with Jung-Woo to trade places so she can get closer to the model of her dreams, though they settle on only one week for the switch. However, upon arriving at Pure Water High, she promptly gets beaten up by the gang member Ga-Woon Kim, apparently Kun Kang's closest friend. Despite this minor setback, Tae does not give up and goes back to the school the next day to continue her attempt to get closer with Kun. Most of the rest of the plot from this first story arc involves Ga-Woon starting to develop feelings of attraction towards Tae, though still under the belief that Tae is really Jung-Woo, Ga-Woon starts to question his sexuality.

The second arc in the Kill Me, Kiss Me series spans the rest of the manhwa from volumes two through five, and has almost no connection with the first arc. The story now concentrates on the beautiful girl Que-Min Ghun, who although appearing innocent at first glance is actually incredibly strong. She attends the same school as Jung-Woo and after meeting him one day in the street, starts to develop a crush on him, going as far as trying to protect him from people like Ghoon-Hahm Che and his gang, the Yi Won. Eventually, Ghoon-Hahm offers an arrangement: in exchange for not beating up Jung-Woo, Que-Min will have to go out with the gang leader himself. Ghoon-Hahm and Que-Min start their forced relationship, and Que-Min finally gets Jung-Woo to remember her name and notice her.

== Characters ==
=== Main characters ===
Im Tae Yeon
Tae Yeon is the main heroine of the first arc of the story but otherwise appears relatively sparingly throughout the rest of the series. She tends to be a strong-willed girl who does not usually give up very easily, and is also not afraid to pick a fight with others stronger than her. She switches places with her male cousin Jung-Woo in order to get closer to a model she admires named Kun Kang. Although eventually she starts to learn more about Kun and his best friend Ga-Woon, whom she also starts developing feelings towards.

Im Jung-Woo
He is the main character of the second arc of the story though serves to start the plot for the first arc. Most of the time Jung-Woo is very passive, showing no emotion unless he is engaged in a fight. Despite his frail appearance, he is relatively physically strong, which takes his opponents off guard. His most defining feature is that he looks a lot like a female, especially later on when he grows his hair out. He has an intense affinity towards dogs as when he was young he found a stray he later named Ghost though it died after it got run over by a car.

Kang Kun
A male model who attends Pure Water High School who is usually either gone from school in a photo shoot, found sleeping in class, or otherwise hanging around his best friend Ga-Woon Kim who he has known since junior high school. Other than in the first arc, he almost never appears again.

Kim Ga-Woon
He is the leader of his small gang though has still gained a reputation as being a strong deviant character. After Tae-Yeon and Jung-Woo switch places, he eventually finds himself starting to feel attracted to Tae-Yeon, though while still thinking her as Jung-Woo, he also starts to question his sexuality.

Lin
She is a short, conceited girl who uses a lot of different tactics to make herself more appealing to the eye, like wearing hair extensions, skin concealer, and plucking her eyebrows, among other things. She has developed a crush on Ghoon-Hahm, but he does not want anything to do with her and also barely even knows she exists. She is also the younger sister of Jin Lee, but the two were not that close, even in their childhood.

Kai
He is the leader of the Ghoo Won gang who knew Ghoon-Hahm back from junior high school, when he was known as Bok-Chil. After a run in they had together during a fight with about twenty other guys against Ghoon-Hahm, he fled to Japan only to come back later.

=== Pretty-boy Fan Club members ===
The "Pretty-boy Fan Club" is a club of a group of female students at Pure Water High School, where Jung-Woo also attends, who take pictures of all of the boys in their school who they view as especially attractive.

Ghun Que-Min
One of the main characters of the second arc, she is a beautiful seventeen-year-old girl who has a past that she has tried very hard to forget. At her old school, she was known as a female thug due to how physically strong she is and this had somewhat of a bad reputation. However, after moving and attending a new school, she was determined not to show anyone new she met her other more stronger side and wanted to be viewed as a normal high school girl. She met Jung-Woo and saved him from gangsters and also wanted to Jung-Woo know her name. One of her interests is writing and she has even taken it upon herself to start writing her first novel which she publishes online.

Me-Yang
She is a very hyper girl who usually wears her hair in two pig tails. Me-Yang also seems to be the most enthusiastic about being in the club and is more or less the unofficial leader of the group. She also appeared in the first arc since she is in Jung-Woo's class and appears to be friends with him.

Yeon-Wha
She is also very enthusiastic about obsessing over all the pretty boys in her high school. She has been observed to have a mild temper when around Lin Lee, who most of the girls in the club detest due to her always stealing all the boys away from them.

Min-Ju
One of the members of the club, though not much is known about her as she appears so sparingly and only has a few lines in the whole series. Other than that, she seems like a typical boy-crazy girl.

=== Yi-Won gang members ===
Che Ghoon-Hahm
Only a first year in high school, he is the leader of the Yi Won gang and has a reputation to be a very tough individual. While in junior high school, he got into several fights where he was outnumbered, but ended up winning them anyway. He and Que-Min first met while still in elementary school and is also where Ghoon-Hahm developed his first crush on Que-Min.

Won-Hee
A third year student, he tends to be one of the most charismatic members of the gang and also the one that talks the most other than Ghoon-Hahm. He seems to be a very friendly person most of the time.

Ju-Yoo
A first year in high school, he has been described as being love struck most of the time but is otherwise a good guy. In the summer, he is nicknamed "Red Sleeveless" due to the red sleeveless shirt he wears during that time and in contrast he is nicknamed "black turtleneck" in the winter for similar reasons.

Dar-Jay
A second year in high school, most of the time he is all talk and is not really that strong. He loves to sing karaoke but is not very good at it.

Yeong-Joon
A first year in high school, he is one of the homosexual members of the gang who is currently in an intimate relationship with Jin Lee. Yeong usually does not say much and seems to be pretty aloof most of the time.

Jin
He is a third year in high school who is the only other homosexual member of the gang. Most of the time he is tending to Yeong Joon in a playful manner, as in feeding him food. On top of that, he also looks very much like a girl. Jin's father is the boss of the Sang-Lee gang, a hardcore mob and so Jin is also the source of money for the Yi-Won gang. He is also the older brother of Lin, but the two were not that close, even in their childhood.
