= Saint Marie (manhwa) =

2004–2005 manhwa series by Yang Yuh-jin

- Cover of the ADV Manga edition of Saint Marie vol. 1, art by Yang Yuh-jin

세인트 마리 RR: Seinteu Mari MR: Seint'ŭ Mari
- Genre: Action/adventure
- Author: Yang Yuh-jin
- Publisher: Daewon C.I.
- English publisher: ADV Manga
- Magazine: Issue
- Original run: 2004–2005
- Collected volumes: 7

Saint Marie (Korean: 세인트 마리) is a manhwa series created by Yang Yuh-jin. It is about a fictional private school, Saint Marie, that becomes a battleground between good and evil.

== Story ==
Dah-In Hyun, a normal everyday schoolgirl, discovers that she and the other students at Saint Marie have become pawns in a proverbial chess game. When her best friend dies trying to defend herself, Dah-In finds herself trapped in a battle where no one is who they seem, and the line between black and white is blurred.

== Characters ==
Dah-In "Illumina" Hyun
A normal, spunky teenager who just happens to be stuck in between a battle between sides. Dah-In's roommate, Na-Na, is a pawn in a battle between sides, and unintentionally involves Dah-In. Undecided side.

Na-Na
Dah-In's roommate and best friend. She has the power to project pictures onto items, which she passes onto Dah-In upon her death. White pawn.

Yoon-Ha
Dah-in's "crush" and boyfriend—for a while. Carefree, rebellious, and downright foxy, he enjoys toying with Dah-In's emotions. Unknown side.

Seung-Hae "Elphege" Kim
He's a freshman in high school, "Matthew" Class. Pessimistic and of noble descent (French), he prefers classy clothes. When it comes to people, he's very cautious and cold-hearted. A perfectionist. Being stubborn and insensitive, some people call him "Whiney". His hobbies are finding other people's weaknesses and screaming. A talent of his is playing the violin. (Seung-Hae even played a violin solo during a choir performance.) His specialty is teleporting, being the fastest among the white chess pieces, and his after school activity is the English club. White Knight.

Suh-Rin "Fabian" Kim
Freshman in middle school, "Matthew" Class. He's the younger brother of Seung-Hae, and he's two years younger than most middle school students, being a child prodigy. This makes him more immature than most other students at Saint Marie. For some reason, he's in love with Shi-Young. Liking old-fashioned clothes, he almost always has a hat to complement his outfit. He extremely dislikes glamorous girls (like Hyun-Jin). His hobby is assembling plastic models and his talent is fixing electronics. He has great fighting skills, and his after school club is the Geology club. White chess piece.

== Reception ==
Critical reception for Saint Marie was positive, with Mania.com calling the book "confusing" and an "intriguing piece of work". Anime News Network wrote that the first volume was "A diamond in the rough; Saint Marie is as beautiful to look at as it is intriguing to read."

=== Publishing notes ===
- Saint Marie was originally published in the United States by ADV Manga but was put on hold due to budget cuts. ADV has since announced that they have no plans on finishing the series.
