= Snow Drop (manhwa) =

Manhwa series

스노우 드롭 RR: Seunou deurop MR: Sŭnou tŭrop
- Genre: Romance, Soap opera, Drama
- Author: Choi Kyung-ah
- Publisher: (South Korea) Daiwon C.I. Inc.
- English publisher: (United States) (Germany) Tokyopop
- Magazine: (South Korea) Issue
- Original run: 1999–2004
- Collected volumes: 12

Snow Drop (Korean: 스노우 드롭) is a manhwa, written and illustrated by Choi Kyung-ah. It was serialized from 1999–2004, becoming one of the most popular Sujeong (Korean shōjo titles). The title "Snow Drop" is also the name, in the storyline, for a book written by the family's mother, and her daughter runs a plant nursery called "Snow Drop".

This manhwa was licensed by Tokyopop for German and English publication. The plot and characters are described, below, using in-universe tone. The characters are named as last-name first.

== Plot ==
After a traumatic event, young Yoo So-na focuses on growing flowers in her Snow Drop plant nursery. However, she is forced by her widowed father to return to a new high school. She is miserable until she meets Oh Hae-gi, a teen model. They easily understand each other because they both have tragic pasts. Against their families' wishes, they fall in love. However, their families have dark secrets. In fact, Hae-gi's brother had kidnapped So-na, who was 12 at the time and caused her mother's death. So-na's friend Ha-da falls in love with Ko-mo, who happened to be Hae-gi's brother whom he believes is a girl. So-na is forced to marry Kwon Hwi-rin, who was grandson of Mr. Yoo's friend.

== Characters ==
- Yoo So-na was named after a tree by her dead mother, Mrs Yoo. So-na struggles in coping with her past. When she was 12, she was kidnapped and sexually assaulted by Oh Gae-ri who happens to be Hae-gi's older brother. Her mother died after the event. Due to this, she became depressed and tried to kill herself. She was taken out of school by her father, to be treated for her depression. On returning to high school, she meets Hae-gi and falls in love with him. So-na owns the flower nursery called "Snow Drop" named after the book her mother wrote, Snow Drop. At the end of the story, Hae-gi and So-na have married and were having a son. Her name is derived from "So-Na-Moo", which means "pine tree by winter".
- Oh Hae-gi is a high school student who works as a model to pay for his mom's surgery. He first meets So-na in school. Shortly after their meeting he quits school to work full-time as a model but then returns to school. Once her father finds out they are dating, Hae-gi is beaten up by So-na's bodyguards. Later, he learns his brother Gae-ri kidnapped So-Na because he needed money, and they are forced to break up. He goes to Hollywood, but Hae-gi still loves So-na. In Volume 9, he and So-na reunite. Following this, he is nearly killed by Ko-mo. Both Hae-gi and So-na are in comas and wake up in Volume 12. Hae-gi becomes a successful actor in Hollywood and marries So-na, with whom he has a son. His name is derived from "Hae-Ba-Ra-Gi", which means "sunflower by summer".
- Oh Ko-mo is Hae-gi's younger brother, who works as a hairdresser. He is obsessed with his brother Gae-ri's death. Later, he meets Ha-da, who falls in love with him without realizing that he is not a girl. He uses Ha-da to get information about Gae-ri's death. In the end, he realises that he loves Ha-da as well. His name is derived from "Cosmos", and stands for autumn.
- Jang Ha-da is the son of a gangster and So-na's childhood friend. He meets Ko-mo and falls in love without realizing she is actually male. He does not like Hae-gi very much, but when So-na tells him that Ko-mo is Hae-gi's "sister" he decides to help them. Ha-da stated that he only likes girls but his love for Ko-Mo overcame the gender boundary.
- Charles is a guy who hires Hae-gi as a nude model, unwilling to let him go. He is also Sun-mi's cousin.
- Jin Sun-mi is a rich, spoiled girl who likes Hae-gi and always tries to tear So-na and Hae-gi apart. She and So-na knew each other from when they were young. Sun-mi knows about So-na's dropping out of school and never fails to mention it. She eventually accepted their relationship. In Volume 12, she and So-na become really close friends, and Sun-mi stops her attempts on "stealing" Hae-gi from So-na. In the end, she is dating like crazy and has a new boyfriend every single day.
- Kwon Hwi-rim is the "fiancée" of So-na, trying to make her fall in love with him instead of Hae-gi. In fact, he was son of a callgirl and a rich man. He has got a troublesome past, and lives with his grandfather. He is actually quite awful sometimes and tried to rape Yoo So-na. He took over his grandfather's company in volume 11. It was never stated how because he was supposed to have the company when he married So-na. In Volume 12 he falls in love with a girl who is living with her sick mother, and they become a couple.
- Oh Gae-hi is Hae-gi's older brother and So-na's kidnapper. He was killed by Jang Ha-da's father age 17, and it was made to look like he died in a car accident. He kidnapped So-na because he needed money so he could take his mother away. She always said that she didn't like their world. Before his death, Gae-hi wanted to become a pilot and enjoyed riding motorcycles. He gave Gae-hi a marble that had an image of an angel's feather. His name is from "Gae-Na-Ri," which means "forsythia by spring".
- Mr Yoo is So-na's father, who was a politician who was widowed by his wife's death. When he realizes that So-na is in love with her kidnapper's brother, he does everything to keep them apart. In volume 11, he accepted his daughter's and Hae-gi's relationship and let So-na do whatever she wants.
- Mrs Yoo is So-na's deceased mother who was a friend of Mrs Oh. She died by the time So-na got kidnapped. She wrote the book Snow Drop, from which So-na's, Hae-gi's, Gae-ri's, and Ko-mo's names come. She spoke to So-na in volume 11 when she got into a suicidal accident. She told So-na that Heaven wasn't where she was meant to be and that she should go back.
- Mrs Oh is the mother of Gae-hi, Hae-gi and Ko-mo. Her son's father left early, and she raised them by herself. She was also best friend to Mrs Yoo. They were the ones who decided about the names in the book "Snow Drop". She was in a coma with supposedly amnesia for five years. At first, she didn't accept Hae-gi's and So-na's relationship. She didn't want anything to happen to her family again. After his close death, she accepted their relationship.
- Jang Hae-Yo is Ha-da's father and a friend of Mr Yoo who killed Oh Gae-ri. When Ha-da was young, he gave Ha-da the club called Romeo after So-na's kidnapping.
