= Choi Kyung-ah =

South Korean manhwa artist

Choi Kyung-ah 최경아
- Born: September 20, 1969 (age 57)
- Notable works: Snow Drop, Bibi, Ice Kiss, Ruby Doll, Crazy Coffie Cat, Love Nawara Dundan!, Myeongtaeja Dyeon

Choi Kyung-ah (Korean: 최경아; born 20 September 1969) is a South Korean manhwa artist. Her popular series Snow Drop is a story about star-crossed teenagers So-na and Hae-gi who fall madly in love. She is married and has a son.

== Works ==
- Snow Drop (1999)
- Bibi (2001)
- Crazy Coffie Cat (written by her husband Uhm Re-Kyeong)
- Love Nawara Dundan! (1999)
- Myeongtaeja Dyeon (2003)
- Ruby Doll (2006)
- Ice Kiss (2006)
- Dreaming Lilac (2008)
