= Rhim Ju-yeon =

South Korean comic writer (born 1976)

Rhim Ju-yeon 임주연
- Born: April 9, 1976 (age 50)
- Area: Artist
- Notable works: President Dad, Ciel

- Rhim Ju-yeon
- Hangul: 임주연
- RR: Im Juyeon
- MR: Im Chuyŏn

Rhim Ju-yeon (born April 9, 1976) is a comics creator from South Korea, creator of manhwa President Dad and Ciel. Rhim debuted in 1999 after she won an accessit from the fourth manhwa contest held by "ISSUE", a manhwa magazine for girls' readers. The awarded work titled "Confession of a Corrupted Public Official" is a parody of The X-Files. Since that her works are known for her sharp sense of humor and parody.

== Works ==
- Confession of a Corrupted Public Official (어느 비리공무원의 고백)
- President Dad
- Rainbow ISBN 3867191719
- Pure Love (순애보)
- Devil's Bride (not to confuse with Se-Young Kim's manhwa of the same name)
- Ciel (씨엘)
- Pure Crown (퓨어크라운)
