= Priceless the Kid =

- Born: Stephan Sullivan Jr. August 3, 1987 (age 39); Valdosta, Georgia
- Other names: PTK, Price
- Occupations: rapper, singer, composer
- Years active: 2008-Present
- Website: http://www.listentoprice.com

Stephan Sullivan Jr. (born August 3, 1987), better known as his stage name Priceless the Kid (or PTK), is an American artist, musician, and songwriter. In 2010 he released a project titled "Diamond Life", which was hosted by Don Cannon and California-based skateboarding and lifestyle company Diamond Supply. It was mixed and mastered by Atlanta engineer and producer Anthony Arasi.

== Early life ==
Priceless was born in Valdosta, Georgia, on Moody Air Force Base. With his father being in the military, soon after his birth the family relocated to southern California. Spending most of his life moving and traveling he has also grown up in Charleston, South Carolina; New Jersey; Guam; and Hawaii. Priceless states in numerous interviews that one of the biggest influences of his sound and the way he creates his records is his travels as a young man.

== Discography ==
=== Studio albums ===
- No Barcode EP (2009)
- Humbled Arrogance (2012)

=== Mixtapes ===
- Diamond Life (2010)
