= Lee Young-you =

South Korean manhwa artist

Lee Young-you 이영유
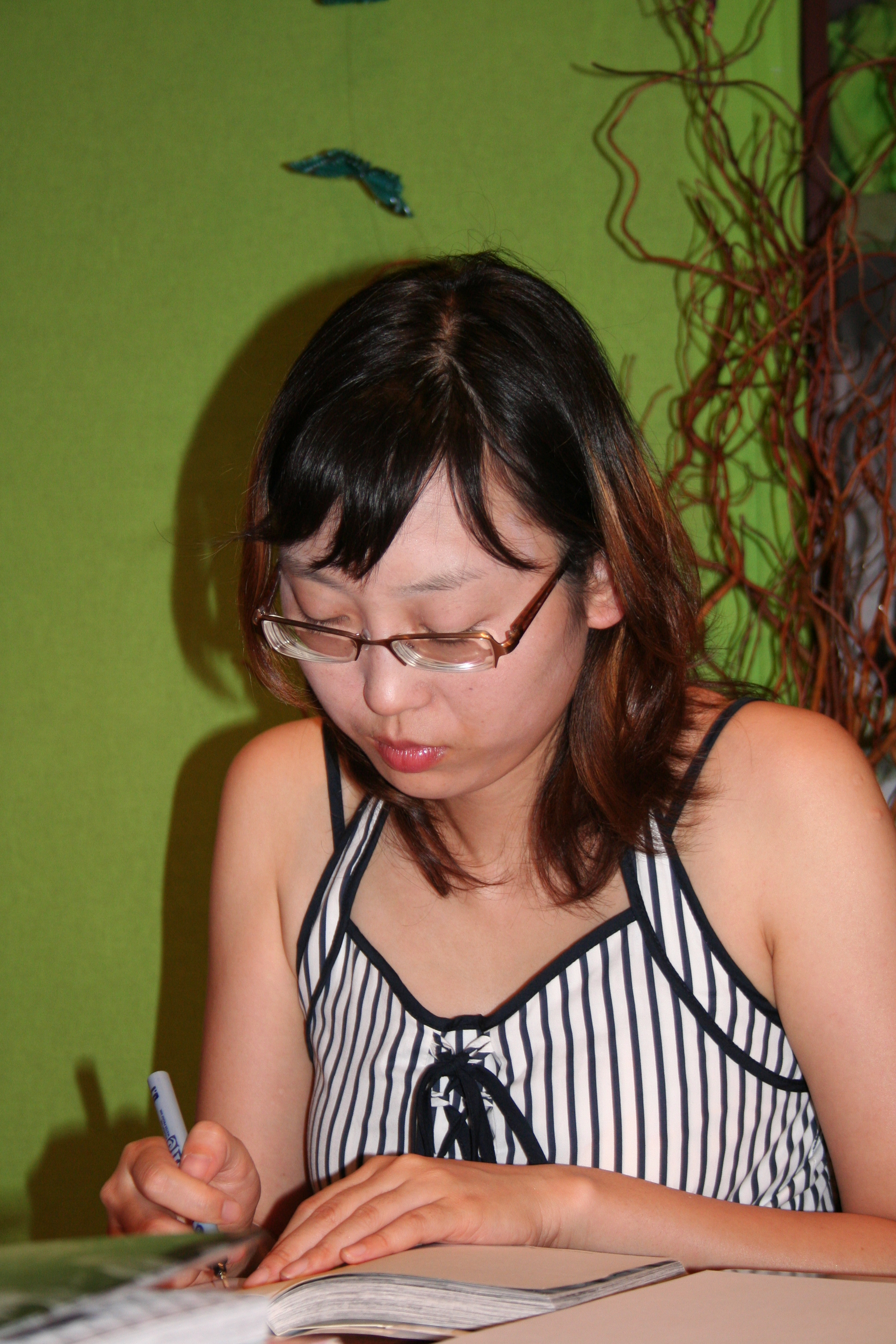
- Born: April 11, 1977 (age 49) Seoul, South Korea
- Areas: Writer, Artist
- Notable works: Kill Me, Kiss Me

Korean name
- Hangul: 이영유
- RR: I Yeongyu
- MR: I Yŏngyu

Lee Young-you (born April 11, 1977, in Seoul, South Korea) is a female creator of Korean manhwa. Several of her series have been translated into English and released in the United States.

== Works ==
- Kill Me, Kiss Me
- Moon Boy
- Priceless
- Pastel Green Spell
- Siesta
- Spring Spring
