= Priceless (manhwa) =

2002 manhwa by Lee Young-You

- Cover of the Tokyopop edition of Priceless vol. 1 (2006), art by Lee Young-you

봄봄 RR: Bombom MR: Pombom
- Genre: Romantic comedy
- Author: Lee Young-you
- Publisher: (South Korea) Daiwon C.I.
- English publisher: (Australia) (New Zealand) Madman Entertainment (Canada) (United States) Tokyopop
- Magazine: (South Korea) Monthly Issue
- Original run: 2002
- Collected volumes: 3

Priceless (Korean: 봄봄) is a South Korean manhwa series by Lee Young-You, published by Daiwon C.I., and was serialized in its monthly girls' magazine, Issue. It was licensed by Tokyopop in North America, and is currently distributed by Madman Entertainment in Australia, who released the third volume in May 2007.

== Plot ==
Left to fend for herself after her mother's drug scam is exposed, Lang-bee has to find a way to repay all the people her mother cheated. She does odd-jobs for her classmates, but she dreams of catching the attention of Dan Won, the rich heir to a corporate empire. Unfortunately, Lang-bee's beautiful and wealthy arch rival Yuka Lee is after the same man! Just as things are getting tough, a young man shows up at Lang-bee's door claiming to be her new father. This 17-year-old playboy is about to turn Lang-bee's life upside down!

== Other information ==
3 Volumes - Complete
