= List of Freezing chapters =

Freezing is a Japanese manga series written by Dall-Young Lim and illustrated by Kwang-Hyun Kim. The series revolves around an extraterrestrial force called the Nova that are invading Earth, and genetically engineered girls called Pandoras and their male partners called Limiters are created to combat them. The story centers on Kazuya Aoi, a Limiter whose late sister was a Pandora, and Satellizer el Bridget, a Pandora with a cold personality who is known as the "Untouchable Queen" for her intense fear of being touched. Both are enrolled at West Genetics Academy, which is a special school that is part of a series of academies that trains Pandoras and Limiters alike to fight against the Nova.

Freezing started serialization in Kill Time Communication's seinen manga magazine Comic Valkyrie in its March 2007 issue, published on January 27, 2007. The first tankōbon was released on October 26, 2007, with a total of twenty-five volumes sold in Japan as of October 25, 2014, under its Valkyrie Comics imprint. Freezing is currently split into two parts: Part 1 which ran from Volume 1 to Volume 14, spanning 96 chapters; and Part 2, going from Volume 15 onwards and currently ongoing in Comic Valkyrie.

A spinoff manga, called Freezing: First Chronicle (フリージング ファーストクロニクル, Furījingu: Fāsuto Kuronikuru), illustrated by Jae-Ho Yoon (the illustrator of Lim's light novel-based manhwa The Phantom King), began serialization in the November 2011 issue of Comic Valkyrie (released on September 27, 2011), and ran four chapters until the March 2012 issue (released January 27, 2012). A prequel to the original series, the story centers on Chiffon Fairchild and Ticy Phenyl's first year at West Genetics prior to them becoming Student Council President and Vice President, and also explains the origin of Chiffon's title, "The Unmatched Smiling Monster". First Chronicle was later released as a tankōbon volume on February 29, 2012.

A second spinoff manga, called Freezing: Zero (フリージングZERO, Furījingu: Zero), illustrated by Soo-Cheol Jeong (the illustrator of Lim's novel-based manhwa The Legend of Maian), began serialization in the May 2012 issue of Comic Valkyrie (published on March 27, 2012) and ended on September 4, 2015. Like First Chronicle before it, Zero is also a prequel to the original series, chronicling the back stories of many Pandoras prior to them attending Genetics. The first bound volume of Zero was released on August 29, 2012. Zero was collected into nine volumes. A third spinoff, called Freezing Pair Love Stories (フリージング ペアラブストーリーズ), was serialized from April 2013 to March 2014 issues of Comic Valkyrie and collected in three volumes.

Outside Japan, Freezing is published in South Korea by Haksan Culture Company, where it is serialized in Booking; in France by Bamboo Edition under their Doki-Doki manga imprint; and in Taiwan by Tong Li Publishing. A 12-episode anime adaptation by A.C.G.T. aired in Japan between January and April 2011 on AT-X and other channels.

== Volume list ==
=== Part 1: Volumes 1-14 ===
The English omnibus editions are published by Seven Seas Entertainment with two volumes per book.

No.	Original release date	Original ISBN	English omnibus release date	English omnibus ISBN
1	October 26, 2007	978-4-86032-474-2	June 23, 2015	978-1-62692-197-9
1. "The Untouchable Queen" (接触禁止の女王, Sesshokukinshi no Jo Ō); 2. "The Hunted Girl" (狙われた女, Nerawa reta on'na); 3. "Pandora vs. Pandora" (パンドラVSパンドラ, Pandora VS Pandora); 4. "Retaliation" (報復役, Hōfuku-yaku); 5. "Target" (ターゲット, Tāgetto)
The Earth has been terrorized by large creatures called Nova; in order to combat them, Pandoras, teenage girls with special abilities, have been developed and trained at West Genetics Academy in Japan. In one of the school’s tournament battles known as the Carnival, two girls are fighting each other, however a guy suddenly rushes one of the girls with a hug, thinking that she is his sister. Kazuya Aoi, the guy in question, is a new student at West Genetics; he learns that the girl is Satellizer el Bridget, nicknamed the “Untouchable Queen”, who, as a result of his interference, lost her number-one ranking among the second-year Pandoras. In an unsanctioned fight, she and Ganessa Roland, the other girl in the match, both activate Pandora Mode, which upgrades their abilities, until their teachers order them to stand down. As Kazuya gets settled at the dorms, he learns that the Pandoras partner with younger male students called Limiters who cast “Freezing” auras that paralyze their opponent. He apologizes to Satellizer, and upon learning that she is actually quite shy and sweet in private, asks to become her Limiter. They are interrupted by the sadistic Miyabi Kannazuki, a third-year student who employs multiple Limiters, and who wants Kazuya for her own. Miyabi humiliates Satellizer, but when Kazuya surprises everyone by countering with his Freezing ability, Satellizer fights back and stabs Miyabi. Later on, third-year Pandora Ingrid Bernstein challenges Satellizer to a duel, but gives her one last chance to find a Limiter.
2	April 30, 2008	978-4-86032-570-1	June 23, 2015	978-1-62692-197-9
6. "Difference in Power" (実力の差, Jitsuryoku no sa); 7. "The Restrained Ingrid - Part 1" (束縛のイングリッド（１）, Sokubaku no Inguriddo (1)); 8. "The Restrained Ingrid - Part 2" (束縛のイングリッド（２）, Sokubaku no Inguriddo (2)); 9. "Decision" (決着, Ketchaku); 10. "The Visitor from Tibet" (チベットからの訪問者, Chibetto kara no hōmon-sha dai); 11. "Her Name is Rana Linchen" (彼女の名はラナ＝リンチェン, Kanojo no na wa Rana Rinchen)
Ingrid fights Satellizer without her Limiter and takes one of her Stigmata. When Ingrid’s Limiter arrives, Kazuya volunteers himself to be Satellizer’s Limiter, but Satellizer refuses. Ingrid is angry that Kazuya and Satellizer are not acting properly. The story flashes back to when Ingrid was in a squad with her friend Marin Maxwell for a training exercise against dummy Nova opponents when they were attacked by a real Nova. Marin sacrificed herself in order to give time for the then second-years to retreat. Back at the present, Ingrid goes into Pandora Mode, but almost loses her sanity until Kazuya stops her. Satellizer agrees to have Kazuya be her Limiter but without going through the “baptism” (Note: Freezing normally can only be done after the pair has performed a ceremony called a "baptism", in which a Pandora implants her own Stigmata tissue into a Limiter. This enables the Pandora and Limiter to unify their senses.) process. In anticipation of their first “room visit”, Kazuya goes to the town to shop, but when he is ambushed by city thugs, he is saved by Rana Linchen, a girl from Tibet. They meet Hiiragi and Arthur, but the thugs return and hold Arthur captive at gunpoint.
3	October 30, 2008	978-4-86032-650-0	September 29, 2015	978-1-62692-198-6
12. "A Sign of Rivalry" (相克の兆し, Sōkoku no kizashi); 13. "Stigma Body" (聖痕体, Seikon-tai); 14. "Strategy" (策謀, Sakubō); 15. "Rana's Strength" (ラナの力, Rana no chikara); 16. "Mortal Combat" (死闘, Shitō); 17. "Punishment" (制裁, Seisai)
Thanks to Kazuya's Freezing, he and his friends defeat the thugs. While he is recovering, Rana believes that Kazuya is her soulmate, but Satellizer attends to Kazuya for the night. Rana joins Satellizer’s class, and spars with Ganessa. Arthur shares with Kazuya about Satellizer’s past at school. Rana flirts with Kazuya, asking him to refer to each other without honorifics, which causes Satellizer to do the same. When Attia Simmons, a third-year, tells Rana that Satellizer has been treating Kazuya like a pet, Rana takes Satellizer to the gym area where they duel. Kazuya interrupts their fight, but Attia arrives with two schoolmates, Arnett McMillan and Creo Brand, who knock Kazuya out and who plan to fight Satellizer (and Rana).
4	April 10, 2009	978-4-86032-739-2	September 29, 2015	978-1-62692-198-6
18. "The Majestic Third-Years - Part 1" (３年の威容１, 3-nen no iyō 1); 19. "The Majestic Third-Years - Part 2" (３年の威容 2, 3-nen no iyō 2); 20. "Reminiscence" (回想, Kaisō); 21. "Counterattack" (反撃, Hangeki); 22. "Each's Respective Pride" (それぞれの誇り, Sorezore no hokori); 23. "Sharpened Stone" (尖った石, Togatta ishi); 24. "Conclusion" (一段落, Hitodanraku)
Arnett and Creo beat Satellizer and Rana using their advanced Double Accel and Tempest Turn techniques. Satellizer refuses to give up; the story flashes back to when she and her mother began living with the El Bridgets. She was abused by her half-brother Louis until her half-sister Violet intervenes. Her mother’s dying words were to become strong and to never lose. Back at the present, Satellizer recovers and beats Arnett with an improved version of the latter's technique, while Rana does the same with Creo. But before Arnett and Creo can retaliate, Chiffon and Ticy stop the fights. As Kazuya recovers, he is attended to by Satellizer and Rana. Because of Satellizer’s improving abilities, Elizabeth Mably, the leader of the third-year Pandoras, orders the girls to withdraw from fighting Satellizer. Kazuya takes Satellizer to a food-theme park where they participate in a couples eating contest along with Ganessa and Arthur.
5	July 12, 2009	978-4-86032-787-3	December 8, 2015	978-1-62692-221-1
25. "East Clash" (イーストクラッシュ, īsutokurasshu); 26. "Cassie Lockheart" (キャシー＝ロックハート, Kyashī Rokkuhāto); 27. "Corrosion" (侵食, Shinshoku); 28. "A Looming Threat" (迫り来る脅威, Semari kuru kyōi); 29. "Nova Form" (ノヴァフォーム, Novu~a fōmu); 30. "Target Location" (狙われた場所, Nerawa reta basho); 31. "Desperate Struggle" (死闘, Shitō)
In the Tenth Nova Crash, East Genetics Academy is attacked by four Type-S Novas. The hours before the battle, Cathy Lockharte, a star third-year student, considers whether to settle and to have a normal life, while her friend Milena Marius persuades her that her abilities are useful for the Chevalier. The Nova show new powers, including a devastating beam attack and one that absorbs Pandoras, the latter of which captures Cathy and Milena. They reappear at West Genetics, deploying the captured Pandoras as Nova forms to invade the school. Their goal is to reach the chamber that holds Marie Lancelot, the Mother of the Pandoras. The elevator entrance is guarded by Satellizer and Ganessa, who end up facing Nova Cathy.
6	October 28, 2009	978-4-86032-829-0	December 8, 2015	978-1-62692-221-1
32. "Elizabeth Mably" (エリザベス＝メイブリー, Erizabesu Meiburī); 33. "Trauma" (トラウマ, Torauma); 34. "Tears" (涙, Namida); 35. "Comrade" (仲間, Nakama); 36. "Stigmata of Sympathy" (同調する聖痕, Dōchō suru seikon); 37. "Shocking Finale" (激動の終わり, Gekidō no owari dai); 38. "Dinner Party" (ディナーパーテ, Dināpāte)
Elizabeth attacks the Nova Forms and discovers a way to free the Pandoras from the Nova’s control. Satellizer continues to fight Nova Cathy. Reflecting on her past when she wanted to be a novelist but was forced to be a Pandora by her father, Cathy struggles against her Nova Form, but launches a fierce attack on Satellizer that is absorbed by Ganessa. Satellizer gets angry that she assumes a Nova Form to attack Cathy and rip out her Stigmata, but does not kill her as Kazuya holds her back. Following the defeat of the Nova, the girls have a party where Satellizer and Elizabeth end up in a drinking contest.
7	March 29, 2010	978-4-86032-898-6	March 15, 2016	978-1-62692-249-5
39. "Invitation" (招待, Shōtai); 40. "To the Tropical Islands" (南の島へ, Minami no shima e); 41. "The Older Sister's Feelings" (姉の気持ち, Ane no kimochi); 42. "Bound" (束縛, Sokubaku); 43. "Jealous Lover" (束縛２, Sokubaku 2; "Bound - Part 2"); 44. "A Woman's Intuition" (女の直感, On'na no chokkan); 45. "True Feelings" (本心, Honshin)
Satellizer invites Kazuya come to their family’s resort in Bali. There, they meet Violet, Louis, and Louis’s Pandora partner, Holly Rose. Although Violet intends to have Louis and Satellizer reconcile, Louis has other plans, blackmailing Satellizer into being his toy again, punishing Holly for saying bad things about Satellizer, and telling Kazuya to find a different partner. He calls the three out to a cliffside where he forces Holly and then Satellizer to say that he is her master.
8	August 25, 2010	978-4-86032-964-8	March 15, 2016	978-1-62692-249-5
46. "Mark of Slavery" (隷属の証, Reizoku no akashi); 47. "Bonds" (絆, Kizuna); 48. "Released Shackles" (解き放たれた束縛, Tokihanata reta sokubaku); 49. "Siblings - Part 1" (姉弟 I, Kyōdai I); 50. "Siblings - Part 2" (姉弟 II, Kyōdai II); 51. "The E-Pandora Project" (Eパンドラ計画, E Pandora keikaku); 52. "Forget That; Let's Play Soccer!" (そんなことよりサッカーしようぜ！, Son'na koto yori sakkā shiyou ze!)
Having claimed ownership over Satellizer, Louis has Holly attack Kazuya, but Satellite blocks her attack and the two girls fight. Holly asks Louis if he ever loved her, but when Louis rejects her, she stabs him, and both of them go off the cliff. After Satellizer rescues them, Louis and Holly reconcile. Following their return to West Genetics, Satellizer and Kazuya learn that the E-Pandora Project of implanting Stigmata into regular people has been approved by the Chevalier. Chiffon, Elizabeth, Satellizer, and Rana are selected to go to Alaska. In a side story, the third-year and second-year girls have a mixed soccer match, however, their tackling maneuvers result in clothes being shredded.
9	October 30, 2010	978-4-86032-993-8	June 21, 2016	978-1-62692-275-4
53. "Sub-Zero Earth" (零下の大地, Reika no daichi); 54. "Pandora vs. Pandora" (パンドラVSパンドラ, Pandora VS Pandora); 55. "Difference in Strength" (実力の差, Jitsuryoku no sa); 56. "Those Who Crawl Along the Ground" (地を這う者達, Chi o hau-sha-tachi); 57. "MARK IV" (マーク IV, Māku IV); 58. "Scarlett Ohara" (スカーレット＝大原, Sukāretto Ōhara); 59. "The Cost of Sacrifice" (生け贄の代償, Ikenie no daishō)
At Alaska, Satellizer and Kazuya meet Pandoras from the other academies including Roxanne Elipton, Charles Bonaparte and Julia Munberk. They are welcomed by Scarlet Ohara, who is in charge of the Evolution Pandora (E-Pandora) Project, where ordinary girls who are implanted with Stigmata are trained to become Pandoras. The regular Pandoras participate in a series of duels with the E-Pandoras; in the third duel, Elizabeth easily defeats Amelia Evans without using her Volt Weapon, but Amelia tries until she cannot move anymore. Ohara wants the E-Pandoras to take the Mark IV drug. Jina Purpleton becomes the first test subject; she has a successful demonstration, but her body breaks down and she turns into a Nova form.
10	February 22, 2011	978-4-7992-0029-2	June 21, 2016	978-1-62692-275-4
60. "The Cost of Sacrifice - Part 2" (生け贄の代償 2, Ikenie no daishō 2); 61. "Typhon Tempest" (テュポン・テンペスト, Te~yupon tenpesuto); 62. "Death of a Comrade" (戦友の死, Sen'yū no shi); 63. "Doubt" (疑念, Ginen); 64. "Determination" (決意, Ketsui); 65. "Obstacle" (立ちはだかる壁, Tachihadakaru kabe); Side Story: "Those Who Make the School Rules" (外伝 ルールを作りし者, Gaiden rūru o tsukurishi mono)
Jina has gone berserk as a Nova Form, fighting Elizabeth, but Amelia tries to stop them from killing Jina, but Jina fights until she is killed by Charles. Her resulting death raises protests from Amelia about the senseless loss of her comrade’s life, but Ohara does not publicly sympathize. Elizabeth agrees to visit Amelia’s brother should Amelia suffer a similar fate. When Elizabeth tries to get her family involved by writing a report questioning the Chevalier’s actions, she is arrested and tortured by the Chevalier, and her family is smeared with scandal. The side story describes Arnett’s early school life at West Genetics where she and Elizabeth become friends.
11	July 27, 2011	978-4-7992-0108-4	October 25, 2016	978-1-62692-341-6
66. "Ideals and Reality" (理想と現実, Risō to genjitsu); 67. "Cold Decision" (非情な決断, Hijōna ketsudan); 68. "Rebellion" (反乱, Hanran); 69. "Elizabeth's Determination" (エリザベスの決意, Erizabesu no ketsui); 70. "Traitors" (反逆者, Hangyaku-sha); 71. "Conflicting Intentions" (激突する意思, Gekitotsu suru ishi); 72. "Fierce Battle" (激闘, Gekitō)
Elizabeth’s limiter Andrei laments being unable to help Elizabeth. Satellizer gets a call from her stepmother, who offers to help if she is in trouble. For the next test, Ohara plans to administer the Mark IV to all of the first-generation E-Pandoras. Amelia and her friends decide to break into the lab and activate their Stigmatas, inciting a rebellion. Elizabeth tries to help Amelia, going against Chiffon’s wishes. Satellizer and Rana try to support as well; when Julia tries to stop them, Cathy steps in to fight Julia. Similarly, Elizabeth steps in to fight Charles.
12	October 27, 2011	978-4-7992-0151-0	October 25, 2016	978-1-62692-341-6
73. "Collision - Part 1" (衝突I, shōtotsu I); 74. "Collision - Part 2" (衝突II, shōtotsu II); 75. "Charles Bonaparte" (シャルル＝ボナパルト, Sharuru Bonaparuto); 76. "Condition for Victory" (勝利の条件, Shōri no jōken); 77. "Difference in Experience" (経験の差, Keiken no sa); 78. "Monster - Part 1" (怪物I, Kaibutsu I); 79. "Monster - Part 2" (怪物II, Kaibutsu II); 80. "An Existence that Can't Be Allowed" (許されなき存在, Yurusa renaki sonzai)
Satellizer and Rana are ordered to stand down by Chiffon. Andrei risks becoming unstable in a Freezing attack to help Elizabeth, but Charles is able to get the upper hand using her Hero’s Stigmata. The story briefly goes into Charles’s past, how she meets the Chevalier vice-president Marks Spencer and is adopted into his family to become a Pandora. After Charles and Elizabeth exchange words about whose sense of justice and sacrifice is right, Andrei lays down a Freezing at the cost of his life so that Elizabeth recovers and defeats Charles with a Volt Loginus. Meanwhile, Satellizer and Rana fight Chiffon, who beats them back, and asks if they know what a True Pandora is. Amelia reaches the lab, but must face Ohara.
13	February 29, 2012	978-4-7992-0212-8	February 28, 2017	978-1-62692-415-4
81. "Forbidden Door" (禁断の扉, Kindan no tobira); 82. "Resonance - Part 1" (共鳴I, Kyōmei I); 83. "Resonance - Part 2" (共鳴II, Kyōmei II); 84. "Connected Hearts" (繋がる心, Tsunagaru kokoro); 85. "Distant Memories" (記憶の底, Kioku no soko); 86. "Anti-Nova - Part 1" (アンチノヴァI, Anchinovu~a I); 87. "Anti-Nova - Part 2" (アンチノヴァII, Anchinovu~a II); 88. "Illusion Turn" (イリュージョンターン, Iryūjontān)
Amelia discovers that Ohara has been making clones of Maria. She goes berserk and turns into a full-on Nova (Eleventh Nova Clash), while the clones break free and absorb into her. The Pandoras begin to react to Amelia’s influence, Satellizer and Rana are corrupted and turn into Nova Forms to fight Chiffon, but Andrei tells Kazuya to use his Freezing to reach their hearts to transform them back to normal. Meanwhile, the other Pandoras fight two type-S Novas and the Maria clones. Chiffon gets serious, opening her eyes for the first time, and takes on Nova Amelia.
14	April 27, 2012	978-4-7992-0244-9 (w/CD Edition); ISBN 978-4-7992-0243-2 (Regular Ed.)	February 28, 2017	978-1-62692-415-4
89. "Heart to Heart" (心と心, Kokoro to kokoro); 90. "Friends" (友達, Tomodachi); 91. "The Meaning of a Smile" (微笑の意味, Bishō no imi); 92. "What She Left Us" (彼女が残したもの, kanojo ga nokoshita mono); 93. "A Time for Change - Part 1" (変革の時 I, Henkaku no toki I); 94. "A Time for Change - Part 2" (変革の時 II, Henkaku no toki II); 95. "A Time for Change - Part 3" (変革の時 III, Henkaku no toki III); 96. "A Time for Change - Part 4" (変革の時 IV, Henkaku no toki IV)
Chiffon tries to get Nova Amelia to surrender but she refuses, and plans to self-destruct. While the Pandoras retreat to take shelter, Chiffon stays out and says goodbye to her friends. Nova Amelia explodes but Chiffon confines the nuclear explosion, sacrificing herself in the process. Chiffon’s love scatters and affects the Pandoras, and the E-Pandoras are neutralized from the effects of the Mark IV. Following the Eleventh Nova Clash, Ohara and Spencer take the fall. Elizabeth takes a break from being a Pandora, leaving the student council president position open at West Genetics. Arnett and Ticy make bids to become the next president, employing a duel instead of a general election. In the battle, Arnett pulls out No Interval Triple Accels but Ticy beats her with her own version of Illusion Turn, and announces she will be stricter than ever as president.

=== Part 2: Volumes 15-29 ===
No.	Original release date	Original ISBN	English release date	English ISBN
15	August 29, 2012	978-4-7992-0303-3	June 27, 2017	978-1-626924-90-1
97. "A New Rival Appears!" (嵐の予兆, Arashi no yochō); 98. "Exercise" (演習, Enshū); 99. "Valkyrie - Part 1" (ヴァルキリーI, Vu~arukirī I); 100. "Valkyrie - Part 2" (ヴァルキリーII, Vu~arukirī II); 101. "A Promise for a Rival" (約束の相手, Yakusoku no aite); 102. "Ouka Tenjouin" (天上院桜花, Tenjōin ōka); 103. "Team 13" (第13小隊, 13 shōtai); 104. "What Kazuha Has Left" (カズハが残したもの, Kazuha ga nokoshita mono)
Gengo Aoi, Kazuya’s grandfather, announces a new project called Valkyrie, which also allows normal girls to assume Pandora powers with temporary Injection Stigmata. Arnett asks Satellizer to help watch over Ticy, but Satellizer declines. Following a demo of the Valkyries’ power, Team 13 is established with the Valkyries, Satellizer and Rana. Ouka Honda, a Valkyrie who is also Kazuya’s cousin, announces that she is his fiancee by arranged marriage. Other members of Team 13 arrive: Cathy, Charles, Roxanne, and the team leader Suna Lee. Kazuya learns why Ouka joined the Valkyries.
16	November 2, 2012	978-4-7992-0335-4	June 27, 2017	978-1-626924-90-1
105. "Causes of Breaking - Part 1" (亀裂の種I, Kiretsu no tane I); 106. "Causes of Breaking - Part 2" (亀裂の種II, Kiretsu no tane II); 107. "Causes of Breaking - Part 3" (亀裂の種III, Kiretsu no tane III); 108. "A Grandfather's Thoughts" (祖父の想い, Sofu no omoi); 109. "Old Memories" (古き記憶, Furuki kioku); 110. "A Risky Situation - Part 1" (一触即発I, Isshokusokuhatsu I); 111. "A Risky Situation - Part 2" (一触即発II, Isshokusokuhatsu II); 112. "Unsolicited" (お節介, Osekkai)
Attia gets upset that Team 13 is given special treatment, Although Charles does not want to be friends with her teammates, Satellizer pledges not to betray her. Attia and Charles’s arguments over their opinions on Elizabeth escalate to fighting where Attia is severely injured, and Charles is detained. Satellizer meets Gengo Aoi; Kazuya is surprised to see Chiffon in an old photo. Attia’s classmates retaliate against Charles but Satellizer intervenes, resulting in disappointment from both Charles and Arnett. Afterwards, Roxanne supports Charles, while Kazuya comforts Satellizer, who is worried that her friendships with Charles and Arnett have fallen apart.
17	January 29, 2013	978-4-7992-0377-4	October 31, 2017	978-1-626925-56-4
113. "Were You Waiting for Me?" (待っててくれる？, Mattete kureru?); 114. "Plasma Weapon" (プラズマウェポン, purazumau~epon); 115. "Maria" (マリア, Maria); 116. "Joint Exercise - Part 1" (合同演習I, Gōdō enshū I); 117. "Joint Exercise - Part 2" (合同演習II, Gōdō enshū II); 118. "Cries - Part 1" (叫呼I, Kyōko I); 119. "Cries - Part 2" (叫呼II, Kyōko II)
After Rana foils Satellizer’s attempt to get intimate with Kazuya, the two girls agree to ally against Ouka as a love rival. Ouka recalls a conversation with Gengo Aoi about their group being potentially stronger than the Pandoras. Atsuko Seiga of Seiga Industries arrives with Faylan Generators, which power not only the Valkyrie’s Plasma Weapons but also the dummy Novas to be used in the training exercise. The Valkyrie Lucy Renault tells Kazuya that they are related and have a connection with the Nova. During the training exercise in which Team 13, along with other teams from West Genetics, fight six dummy Novas, one of the Novas emits a strange sound that resonates with the Pandoras, causing illusions of being taunted and attacked (Rana sees an illusion of her sister while Satellizer sees an illusion of Kazuha). Roxanne and Charles are able to dispel theirs, and the Pandoras are ordered to remove the Stigmatas of those still affected, Gengo authorizes the Valkyries to use the Plasma Weapons on the dummy Novas.
18	March 3, 2013	978-4-7992-0402-3	October 31, 2017	978-1-626925-56-4
120. "Cries - Part 3" (叫呼III, Kyōko III); 121. "Plan" (計画, Keikaku); 122. "Transcendence" (変貌, Henbō); 123. "With All Yourself" (自分の全て, Jibun no subete); 124. "New Power" (新しい力, Atarashī chikara); 125. "Beyond" (超越, Chōetsu); 126. "New Life Forms" (新生, Shinsei)
As the Valkyries attack the dummy Novas, Headquarters detects the presence of N1 Novas all over the battlefield. Satellizer continues to struggle against the illusion of Kazuha, but inadvertently stabs Kazuya in the chest. Charles and Roxanne battle Nova Arnett. Satellizer manages to “transcend” her Nova Form and revives Kazuya. Although the Valkyries defeat three of the dummy Novas, the Nova cores break up to form smaller saurian Novas, which ravage the Pandoras and their Limiters. Kazuha blesses the transcended Satellizer to look after Kazuya; Rana has transcended. Ticy cowers in fear as she is taunted by Chiffon’s image. In the sky, a female Nova figure (Nova commander) watches over the battle.
19	May 29, 2013	978-4-7992-0429-0	February 27, 2018	978-1-626926-86-8
127. "Anxiety" (不安, Fuan); 128. "Growth" (増殖, Zōshoku); 129. "Sacrifices" (犠牲, Gisei); 130. "Courage" (勇気, Yūki); 131. "Overwhelming Power" (圧倒, Attō); 132. "Return" (帰還, Kikan); 133. "Trust" (信頼, Shinrai)
The Chevalier move to the battlefield but can only fight at limited strength so as to not be turned into Nova Forms. The Nova commander has the other dummy Novas break up into hundreds more saurian Novas to join the fray. Sister Margaret confronts Gengo over his actions. Waking up from her illusion, Arnett tries to save Charles against the saurian Novas; they are saved by the transcended Satellizer and Rana. Lucy tells the Valkyries to retreat, saying that she is a True Pandora and that the sisters are reacting to those who have transcended. Ticy continues to struggle with Chiffon’s image as she tries to save a Pandora in battle, when Elizabeth arrives to help.
20	July 27, 2013	978-4-7992-0454-2	February 27, 2018	978-1-626926-86-8
134. "Violated" (蹂躙, Jūrin); 135. "The Immortal Pandora" (不死身のパンドラ, Fujimi no Pandora); 136. "A Cry From the Soul" (魂の叫び, Tamashī no sakebi); 137. "Difference In Strength" (格の違い, Kaku no chigai); 138. "Light Speed Bullet" (光速の弾丸, Kōsoku no dangan); 139. "Guardians" (守護者, Gādian); 140. "Legends" (レジェンド, Rejendo)
As Ticy and Elizabeth fight the saurian Novas, Ticy overcomes her fears and transcends. Meanwhile, the Nova commander defeats Roxanne, turning her into a Nova Form. Satellizer, Rana, and Arnett must fight Nova Roxanne, but Charles pleads for them not to kill her. The pleas reach Roxanne who turns back enough to self-destruct. The girls fight the Nova commander, but lose badly until they are saved by a new girl: Windy May. Meanwhile, scores of saurian Novas are being blasted by Legendary Pandoras Cassandra and Teslad.
21	October 5, 2013	978-4-7992-0497-9	June 26, 2018	978-1-626928-03-9
141. "The Sisters from Lab.13 - Part 1" (ラボ13の姉妹 I, Rabo 13 no shimai I); 142. "The Sisters from Lab.13 - Part 2" (ラボ13の姉妹 II, Rabo 13 no shimai II); 143. "Lull" (小康状態, Shōkō jōtai); 144. "Distant memory" (遠い記憶, Tōi kioku); 145. "Kin" (血縁, Ketsuen); 146. "Definition of a Human Being" (人間の定義, Ningen no teigi); 147. "Preliminary Battle - Part 1" (前哨戦 I, Zenshōsen I)
Windy heals Satellizer’s group, and easily defeats the Nova commander. Gengo reveals that Windy and the other Legendary Pandoras are part of his family. Following the Nova Clash, Sister Margaret announces the classifications of the saurian Novas to be N2, and the Nova commander to be N3 / Pandora Class. Gengo tells Kazuya the truth about their family and their connection to the Legendary Pandoras. Kazuya leaves to cool his head, telling Satellizer and Rana he does not want to see them for a while. Gengo offers Atsuko Seiga a job with his next research project. The Pandoras and Valkyries ponder what to do next. Frustrated with the progress of her research, Atsuko recruits a Stigmata technology expert: Scarlet Ohara.
22	December 21, 2013	978-4-7992-0521-1	June 26, 2018	978-1-626928-03-9
148. "Preliminary Battle - Part 2" (前哨戦 II, Zenshōsen II); 149. "Failure list" (不適因子, Futeki inshi); 150. "Restart" (再始動, Saishidō); 151. "A Brief Reprieve" (束の間の休息, Tsukanoma no Kyūsoku); 152. "Motherhood" (母性, Bosei); 153. "Behind the smile" (微笑みの裏, Hohoemi no ura); 154. "Family Bonds" (家族の絆, Kazoku no kizuna)
Perceiving Gengo Aoi to be a threat, Radox Phantomime of the Chevalier hires assassins to “kill the cat”. The assassins, known as Busters, consist of three incarcerated felons with hundreds of years of murder sentences, and one who was not convicted but has a related past of killing Pandoras. Gengo persuades Ohara to join his new research team, revealing a secret about Maria’s status. Kazuya must escort his aunts as they visit town; Cassandra causes a ruckus when she refuses to hand over a child to her mother. Isuzu Sawatari is recruited to join the Busters. Arnett has Satellizer ask Elizabeth for love advice.
23	March 29, 2014	978-4-7992-0562-4	February 19, 2019	978-1-626929-54-8
155. "Busters Mobilize - Part 1" (バスターズ始動I, Basutāzu shidō I); 156. "Busters Mobilize - Part 2" (バスターズ始動II, Basutāzu shidō II); 157. "Raid" (強襲, Kyōshū); 158. "License to Kill" (殺人免許, Satsujin menkyo); 159. "Vicious" (悪辣, Akuratsu); 160. "The Busters' Terrifying Might - Part 1" (スターズの脅威I, Basutāzu no kyōi I); 161. "The Busters' Terrifying Might - Part 2" (スターズの脅威II, Basutāzu no kyōi II)
The Busters approach West Genetics, who are having a party to brighten up the mood. Petty challenges Sawatari to assume leadership of the Busters. Amelia Evans reveals to Ohara why she is serving as her bodyguard. Kazuya and Satellizer reconcile, but Satellizer’s plan to drug and seduce Kazuya fails as the Busters interrupt the party and attack the Pandoras. Realizing that the Busters are targeting him, Gengo wants the Legendary Pandora to fight. The Busters fight Arnett, Satellizer, and Elizabeth, beating them with ease that Petty and Sawatari move onward, encountering Rana with Legendary Pandoras Windy, Lucy, and Teslad. Ticy joins the fight against Jessica and Isabella.
24	June 28, 2014	978-4-7992-0599-0	February 19, 2019	978-1-626929-54-8
162. "The Busters' Terrifying Might - Part 3" (スターズの脅威III, Basutāzu no kyōi III); 163. "Humiliation" (屈辱, Kutsujoku); 164. "Anti-Freezing - Part 1" (アンチフリージングI, Anchifurījingu I); 165. "Anti-Freezing - Part 2" (アンチフリージングII, Anchifurījingu II); 166. "Inevitable" (さだめられしこと, Sadame rareshi koto); 167. "True Nature" (本性, Honshō); 168. "Weakness - Part 1" (弱点I, Jakuten I)
The Busters show their prowess with Jessica defeating Ticy, and Isabella attempting to rape Abel. Cassandra wakes up and challenges Jessica and Isabella. Meanwhile, Windy beats down Petty, but the legendary Pandoras are then caught in an Anti-Freezing field by Sawatari. Gengo organizes a retreat and deploys the Valkyries to go after the Busters. Jessica activates Anti-Freezing on Cassandra, however the latter hears an alien message commanding her and her sisters to “destroy everything”. Windy and Teslad are similarly affected and the three turn into N3 Nova. The Valkyries arrive; Lucy orders the Chevalier and Genetics Pandora to retreat while she battles her affected sisters. Petty flees, but discovers Sawatari has fled as well, but when she confronts Sawatari on that, she is quickly killed. As Gengo and Suna Lee try to escape, but Sawatari arrives and kills Gengo’s guards, and is prepared to face Suna Lee.
25	October 25, 2014	978-4-7992-0648-5	November 12, 2019	978-1-642757-20-0
169. "Weakness - Part 2" (弱点II, Jakuten II); 170. "Shared Past - Part 1" (공유과거I); 171. "Shared Past - Part 2" (공유과거II); 172. "Devilsh"; 173. "Struggle"; 174. "Sudden Change"; 175. "Way Out"
26	December 25, 2014	978-4-7992-0675-1	November 12, 2019	978-1-642757-20-0
176. "Comeback"; 177. "Simulacrum"; 178. "Created Existences"; 179. "Illusion - Part 1"; 180. "Illusion - Part 2"; 181. "Soul"; 182. "Sacrifice"
27	March 3, 2015	978-4-7992-0704-8	-	—
183. "Legacy of the Past"; 184. "Aoi Ryuuichi" (隆一葵, Ryūichi Aoi); 185. "Siblings"; 186. "Mask - Part 1"; 187. "Mask - Part 2"; 188. "Decision"; 189. "Substitute"
28	August 27, 2015	978-4-7992-0783-3	-	—
190. "Rejection - Part 1"; 191. "Rejection - Part 2"; 192. "Rejection - Part 3"; 193. "Role - Part 1"; 194. "Role - Part 2"; 195. "Values"; 196. "Suitable Power"
29	April 27, 2016	978-4-7992-0892-2	-	—
197. "Turning Point"; 198. "Noise"; 199. "Coming of the War Princess"; 200. "Arcadia"; 201. "Evolution"; 202. "Mother"

=== Part 3: Volumes 30- ===
No.	Original release date	Original ISBN	English release date	English ISBN
30	August 26, 2016	978-4-7992-0946-2	-	—
203. "A New Door"; 204. "Their Decisions"; 205. "He Who Accepts Fate"; 206. "Unknown World I"; 207. "Unknown World II"
31	September 30, 2017	978-4-7992-1078-9	-	—
208. "Rounds" September 6, 2016; 209. "Stone Statues of Lamentation" October 14, 2016; 210. "Maria" June 26, 2017; 211. "Circle of Knots" July 24, 2017
32	May 29, 2018	978-4-7992-1151-9	-	—
212. August 21, 2017; 213. October 2, 2017; 214. October 30, 2017; 215. December 25, 2017; 216. February 5, 2018
33	November 30, 2018	978-4-7992-1203-5	-	—

== Spin-offs ==
=== Freezing: First Chronicle ===
No.	Release date	ISBN
1	February 29, 2012	978-4-7992-0211-1
1. "Zero Points Girls" (ロポイントの少女達, Zero pointo no shōjo-tachi); 2. "Friends" (友達, Tomodachi); 3. "Beginning of the Legend" (伝説の始まり, Densetsu no hajimari); 4. "Monster" (化け物, Bakemono)
During the Winter Carnival, Sister Margaret notes that Chiffon Fairchild has amassed 35,000 points to top her class. The story then transitions back to when Chiffon first joins the academy as a late enrolled new student. Ticy Phenyl, known as “Zero Points” for her lack of participation in her year's first Carnival, is bullied by her schoolmates to do jobs for them. Chiffon arrives and becomes Ticy's roommate. Schoolmates Feris and Tasha tell Chiffon to stay away from Ticy, but Chiffon prefers they all be friends, and does not care about pecking orders. Feris and Tasha extort Ticy into taking embarrassing photos of Chiffon by abducting her pet turtle. However, the turtle dies and they try to replace it. Chiffon gets upset for Ticy that she asks for the girls to return her turtle, but the girls tell her they can settle it at the Summer Carnival. Ticy tries to make it a duel, but the girls beat her up and humiliate her, until Chiffon defends Ticy and beats them up. Chiffon goes on a rampage, killing 50 Pandora, and almost killing Arnett until Ticy intervenes and tells her to stop, and to go back to being the friendly Chiffon she used to be. Following the battle, she checks in with the Chevalier, and encourages Ticy, who happened to “defeat” Chiffon to become third place.

=== Freezing: Zero ===
No.	Release date	ISBN
1	August 29, 2012	978-4-7992-0304-0
1. "Kazuha Aoi - Part 1" (アオイ＝カズハ I, Aoi Kazuha I); 2. "Kazuha Aoi - Part 2" (アオイ＝カズハ II, Aoi Kazuha II); 3. "Kazuha Aoi - Part 3" (アオイ＝カズハ III, Aoi Kazuha III); 4. "Kazuha Aoi - Part 4" (アオイ＝カズハ IV, Aoi Kazuha IV); 5. "Kazuha Aoi - Part 5" (アオイ＝カズハ V, Aoi Kazuha V)
Centers on Kazuha Aoi's second year at West Genetics alongside Yumi and Elize as part of the Numbers elite unit.
2	February 27, 2013	978-4-7992-0390-3
6. "Arnett McMillan - Part 1" (アーネット＝マックミルランI, Ānetto Makkumiruran I); 7. "Arnett McMillan - Part 2" (アーネット＝マックミルランII, Ānetto Makkumiruran II); 8. "Elizabeth Mably - Part 1" (エリザベス＝メイブリーI, Erizabesu Meiburī I); 9. "Elizabeth Mably - Part 2" (エリザベス＝メイブリーII, Erizabesu Meiburī II); 10. "Elizabeth Mably - Part 3" (エリザベス＝メイブリーIII, Erizabesu Meiburī III)
Centers on Arnett McMillan and Elizabeth Mably's backstories prior to entering West Genetics.
3	June 27, 2013	978-4799204429
11. "28th Generation West Genetics - Part 1" (第28期ウェストゼネティックスI, 28-ki Uesutozenetikkusu I); 12. "28th Generation West Genetics - Part 2" (第28期ウェストゼネティックスII, 28-ki Uesutozenetikkusu II); 13. "28th Generation West Genetics - Part 3" (第28期ウェストゼネティックスIII, 28-ki Uesutozenetikkusu III); 14. "28th Generation West Genetics - Part 4" (第28期ウェストゼネティックスIV, 28-ki Uesutozenetikkusu IV)
4	November 29, 2013	978-4799205099
15. "28th Generation West Genetics - Part 5" (第28期ウェストゼネティックスV, 28-ki Uesutozenetikkusu V); 16. "28th Generation West Genetics - Part 6" (第28期ウェストゼネティックスVI, 28-ki Uesutozenetikkusu VI); 17. "Effort and Talent - Part 1" (努力と才能I, Doryoku to sainō I); 18. "Effort and Talent - Part 2" (努力と才能II, Doryoku to sainō II)
5	March 29, 2014	978-4799205631
19. "Sister and Brother - Part 1" (姉と弟I, Ane to otōto I); 20. "Sister and Brother - Part 2" (姉と弟II, Ane to otōto II); 21. "Sister and Brother - Part 3" (姉と弟III, Ane to otōto III); 22. "Sister and Brother - Part 4" (姉と弟IV, Ane to otōto IV)
6	July 26, 2014	978-4799206126
Stories about Cathy Lockharte, Satellizer el Bridget, and Sister Margaret.
7	December 25, 2014	978-4799206768
8	March 30, 2015	978-4799207178
9	October 2, 2015	978-4799207987

=== Freezing Pair Love Stories ===
No.	Release date	ISBN
1	September 27, 2013	978-4799204559
1. "Ganessa Roland x Arthur Clipton" (ガネッサ＝ローランド×アーサー＝クリプトン, Ganessa Rōrando × Asā Kuriputon); 2. "Creo Brand x Itsuki Goro" (クレオ＝ブランド×イツキ＝ゴロウ, Kureo Burando × Itsuki Gorō); 3. "Kim Yumi x Elise Schmitz" (キム＝ユミ×エリズ＝シュミッツ, Kimu Yumi × Erizu Shumittsu); 4. "Ticy Phenyl x Abel Rotomaster" (ティシー＝フェニール×アベル＝ロトマスター, Tishī Fenīru × Aberu Rotomasutā)
A series of stories about how different Pandoras have met the guys that would become their Limiters. Ganessa struggles with the idea of having to find a Limiter, but during a preparation for her class haunted house, she meets Arthur. Creo is one of the shortest girls in her class that she becomes a target for harassment by juniors and seniors alike, but is befriended by the tall Itsuki, who is overcoming his own fears. Yumi and Elise were students, they were fierce rivals that fall in love with the same guy. When Ticy Phenyl goes undercover at a club, she gets in trouble with some guys but is saved by Abel, who later takes her on a date and asks her for advice on asking someone to be his partner.
2	November 29, 2013	978-4799205105
5. "Arnett MacMillan x Morrison Abebe" (アーネット＝マックミルラン×モリソン＝アベベ, Ānetto Makkumiruran × Morison Abebe); 6. "Arnett MacMillan x Morrison Abebe - Part 2" (アーネット＝マックミルラン×モリソン＝アベベ II, Ānetto Makkumiruran × Morison Abebe II); 7. "Attia Simmons x Mark Antony" (アティア＝シモンズ×マーク＝アントニー, Atia Shimonzu × Māku Sntonī); 8. "Ingrid Bernstein x Leo Bernard " (イングリッド＝バーンシュタイン×レオ＝バーナード, Inguriddo Bānshutain × Reo Bānādo)
3	March 29, 2014	978-4799205655
9. "Holly Rose x Luis el Bridget - Part 1" (ホーリー＝ローズ×ルイス＝エル＝ブリジットI, Hōrī Rōzu × Ruisu Eru Burijitto I); 10. "Holly Rose x Luis el Bridget - Part 2" (ホーリー＝ローズ×ルイス＝エル＝ブリジットII, Hōrī Rōzu × Ruisu Eru Burijitto II); 11. "Miyabi Kannazaki x Kannazuki Guards" (神無月ミヤビ×神無月親衛隊, Kan'nadzuki Miyabi × Kan'nadzuki Shin'eitai); 12. "Roxanne Elipton x Han Shijin " (ロックサンヌ＝エリプトン×ハン＝シジン, Rokkusan'nu Eriputon × Han Shijin)
