= Sanction =

A sanction may be either a permission or a restriction, depending upon context, as the word is an auto-antonym.

Examples of sanctions include:

== Government and law ==
- Sanctions (law), penalties imposed by courts
- Economic sanctions, typically a ban on trade, possibly limited to certain sectors (such as armaments), or with certain exceptions (such as food and medicine), e.g.,
  - Sanctions against Iran
  - Sanctions against North Korea
- International sanctions, coercive measures adopted by a country or a group of countries against another state or individual(s) in order to elicit a change in their behavior
  - International sanctions during the Russo-Ukrainian War
- Pragmatic sanction, historically, a sovereign's solemn decree which addresses a matter of primary importance and which has the force of fundamental law

== Television episodes ==
- "Sanction", Freezing season 1, episode 7 (2011)
- "Sanctions", Gangsta episode 5 (2015)
- "The Sanction", V: The Series episode 5 (1984)

== Other uses ==
- Sanctions, a mechanism of social control
- Sports governing body or sanctioning body

== See also ==
- Sanctions involving Russia
- Sanctioned name, a special name in mycology
- Wikipedia:Sanctions
