= List of Freezing characters =

Satellizer el Bridget (left) and Kazuya Aoi (right), two of the three main characters of Freezing.

The manga and anime series Freezing features a cast of characters designed by Dall-Young Lim and illustrated by Kwang-Hyun Kim. The series is set in the year 2065 where Earth is in the middle of a war with extra-dimensional aliens called Nova. In order to fight the Nova, the military develops Pandoras (パンドラ): girls who are able to adapt special genetic tissue called stigmata (聖痕, Seikon) to manifest superhuman fighting skills and weapons. (Note: Volt Weapons (ボルトウェポン, Boruto Wepon) are special weapons that Pandoras fashion in combat. They are made with a special material called Volt Texture (ボルトテクスチャー, Boruto Tekusuchā) which is activated through their stigmata. The Volt Texture heightens and improves a Pandora's senses such as hearing and eyesight, and allows them to make quick clothing changes or repair any damaged clothes.^{[S1 ep 2]} Pandoras also have the ability to regenerate lost limbs.) Supporting the Pandoras are male partners called Limiters (リミッター, Rimittā), who use special "freezing" powers to restrict their opponent's mobility. The main story focuses on Kazuya Aoi, a Limiter whose late sister was a Pandora, and Satellizer el Bridget, a powerful Pandora with a cold personality who is known as the Untouchable Queen. Both are enrolled at West Genetics Academy, where they encounter various Pandoras who view Satellizer as a rival and troublemaker, and who pride themselves by a strict ranking system within their school years. They are joined by Rana Linchen, a transfer student Pandora from Tibet who wants to make Kazuya her soulmate. They meet students from other schools, girls who aspire to acquire Pandora powers, and have to deal with Nova threats. Lim has written several spin-off stories that focus on the supporting characters, and the anime adaptation has also highlighted some of his other characters. Reception of the characters from the manga and anime reviewers has been mixed.

== Main characters ==
=== Kazuya Aoi ===
Voiced by: Mitsuhiro Ichiki^{[S1 ep 1]} (Japanese); Jessie James Grelle (English)
Kazuya Aoi (アオイ=カズヤ, Aoi Kazuya) is the protagonist of the series. Hailing from Japan, he enrolls at West Genetics as a first-year student.^{[ch 2]}^{[ep 12]} His older sister, Kazuha, was a Pandora who sacrificed herself in order to defeat a powerful Nova during the eighth Nova Clash in Japan. At first, he mistakes Satellizer for his sister and gives her a big hug. Despite warnings from his schoolmates to stay away from her, he realizes that she is misunderstood, and continues to treat her kindly, defending her even when she does not ask for such help,^{[vol 1]} and asking to partner with her.^{[vol 2]}
As a Limiter, he is able to cast a "Freezing" field, however, unlike the other Limiters, he is able to do so without being Baptized (Note: Freezing normally can only be done after the pair has performed a ceremony called a Baptism (洗礼, Senrei), in which a Pandora implants her own stigmata tissue into a Limiter. This enables the Pandora and Limiter to unify their senses. When the Pandora and the Limiter synchronize their senses in a battle, they form an Ereinbar Set (イレインバーセット, Ireinbā Setto).) with a Pandora.^{[ch 3]}^{[ch 13]} His ability is also unusual in that it is omnidirectional,^{[ch 9]} and can sometimes override the freezings cast by multiple Limiters.^{[ch 3]} The reason for this because of his genetic makeup where over 30% of his body mass is pure stigmata, ^{[S1 ep 5]} which is even greater than his sister. When he learns from his grandfather about his connection to the Nova and the Legendary Pandoras, he becomes enraged at his manipulations.^{[vol 21]} During the thirteenth Nova Clash, when he tries to stop Cassandra from her N3 Nova state, he awakens his Stigmatic body and obtains a special power that allows him to control several Pandoras at once and make them work in tandem to bring out their full potential.^{[vol 25]}

=== Satellizer el Bridget ===
Voiced by: Mamiko Noto (Anime), Haruka Tomatsu (Extension) (Japanese); Caitlin Glass (English)^{[S1 ep 1]}
Satellizer el Bridget (サテライザー=エル=ブリジット, Sateraizā Eru Burijitto) is the heroine of the series and one of the strongest Pandoras at West Genetics. She was the top-ranked student in her year until she loses in the Carnival (Note: A Carnival (カーニバル, Kānibaru) is a battle royal event held every season to determine a Pandora's ranking within her school year. Battles conducted outside the Carnival do not count towards changing a Pandora's rank.^{[vol 1]} Pandoras accumulate points based on which foes they defeat and also for consecutive wins. The points can carry through to other Carnivals.^{[First Chron]}) (battle royal tournament) at the beginning of the story because of Kazuya's interference. Known as the Untouchable Queen (接触禁止の女王, Sesshokukinshi no Joō) because she despises being touched, she is cold and ruthless, reputed to have killed 20 Pandoras.^{[S1 ep 2]}^{[vol 1]} Her Genetics uniform consists of a red dress with gold accents. Her Volt Weapon is Nova Blood (ノヴァ・ブラッド, Nova Buraddo), a single-edged sword with the blade running past the length of the guard.^{[vol 1]} She has multiple stigmata, six of which were originally from Kazuha Aoi, and displays an exceptional ability to learn and use high-end battle techniques such as Accel Turn (Note: High-end skills (ハイエンドスキル, Hai Endo Sukiru) allow a Pandora to increase her speed and maneuverability during battle. * Accel Turn (アクセルターン, Akuseru Tān) gives the Pandora short bursts in speed. The abilities include variants in speed (e.g. Double Accel, Triple Accel, Quad Accel) as well as a lag time (interval, no interval).^{[S1 ch 19]} * Tempest Turn (テンペストターン, Tenpesuto Tān) is a high-end skill that allows a Pandora to create copies of herself to attack from multiple angles. Pandoras usually specialize in either Accel Turn or Tempest Turn.^{[S1 ch 19]}) typically taught to third-year Pandoras.^{[ch 26]}^{[S1 ep 9]}
Despite her fearsome reputation and ruthlessness in battle, in private she has a quiet and reserved nature, with a shy, sensitive, and gentle personality, keeping a diary, stuffed animals, and knitting materials.^{[ch 5]} Originally, she does not want anything to do with Kazuya, but is won over by his kindness and persistence.^{[vol 1]} She accepts him as her Limiter, but, withholds from performing the Baptism ritual with him. She gets jealous that Rana has Kazuya refer to her without the honorifics, that she insists that Kazuya do the same with her nickname, Satella (サテラ, Satera; also Satelli).^{[S1 ep 6]}^{[ch 14]} Every once in a while, she tries to muster up her courage to ask Kazuya to perform the Baptism with her but she is usually interrupted by another classmate,^{[vol 15]} or some major incidents.^{[vol 23]}
Hailing from the United Kingdom, she is the daughter of Howard el Bridget, who runs the El corporation,^{[ch 14]} and his mistress, Noel Alon-Grache. At nine years old, she and her mother are taken in by the El Bridgets where she meets her father's wife Olivia and her two kids, Violet and Louis, the last of whom mistreats and then sexually abuses her. She stays silent about it so that her terminally-ill mother can continue to receive medical care, but when Violet discovers what happened, she moves Satellizer away for her own safety. Her mother's final words are for her to become stronger than anyone and to never lose.^{[ch 20]}^{[S1 ep 7]} This becomes Satellizer's driving force in life, resulting in her severe determination and will. Because of the abuse, she hates being touched and retaliates with violence if anyone does so, with Kazuya being the only exception. In an incident at East Genetics, she brutally cripples Brooks Leevon, a male student who tried to touch her, and was consequently suspended for the school year.^{[ch 14]}^{[S1 ep 6]} In the Bali story, she still has trouble standing up against Louis, but tells him that she loves Kazuya.^{[vol 7]}
In several interviews, English voice actor Caitlin Glass has mentioned how Satellizer was a different from her usual acting roles, that it helped challenge her acting range. She describes Satellizer as an ice queen and misunderstood, but liked that she had a duality in her character: a strong front wherever she goes, but a different one in her private life, something that all people have. Satellizer also has a troubled past that gave her more depth than other heroine characters. She also noted that with all the new voice actors in the project, it was vaguely similar to how Satellizer feels at her school.
A poll by Japanese internet service provider BIGLOBE had Satellizer placed 30th on a list of their favourite tsundere characters, as ranked by fans, with 24 votes. She was also ranked 25th on a list of anime characters that "Prove Japan Loves Blue Eyes" by anime website GoBoiano. She again made a list by the same website of anime characters that "Prove Glasses Are Sexy", and ranked 2nd on a third list of the "27 Hottest Blonde Girls In Anime". Dakimakuras of Satellizer and Elizabeth Mably featured as Freezing merchandise at Comiket 85. Other Freezing merchandise include figurines of the character.

=== Rana Linchen ===
Voiced by: Kana Hanazawa (Japanese); Jamie Marchi (English)^{[S1 ep 5]}
Rana Linchen (垃娜 林沁/ラナ=リンチェン, Rana Rinchen) is a Pandora from Tibet; she has dark hair and a side ponytail tied with a ribbon.^{[vol 3 cover]} Kind yet naive, she transfers to West Genetics as a second-year student to learn more about her Pandora abilities.^{[S1 ep 6]} Because of Kazuya's kindness when they first meet, and because her stigmata resonate with his presence, she believes Kazuya is her soulmate.^{[S1 ep 5]}^{[ch 12]} She is tricked by Attia into thinking Satellizer has been using Kazuya for his powers,^{[ch 14]}^{[S1 ep 6]} but later allies with her to fight Attia and the rival third-year students. Although Kazuya chooses Satellizer as his partner, she still hopes to convince him to become her Limiter, and maintains a love rivalry with Satellizer.^{[vol 3]}
Rana has six stigmata, which she calls Kunlun's Tears (クンルンの涙, Kunrun no Namida).^{[S1 ep 5]}^{[S1 ep 12]} One of her stigmata is a "Maria-type" (appeared when she was born) while the others were surgically implanted.^{[ch 39]} Her specialty is in close-quarters combat; her Volt Weapon, Four Mindsets (四念, Shinen; lit. 'Four Senses'), hardens her gloves and boots.^{[S1 ep 6]}^{[ch 13]} She uses Hallowed Gate Baiji Quan (聖門八極拳, Seimon Hakkyoku-ken), a fighting style where her stigmata energy enhances her abilities so she can use powerful techniques such as: Void Fang (空牙, Kūga), a punch that sends long-distance shockwaves to hit an opponent;^{[ch 15-16]} and Enga (炎牙, Flaming Fang), a short-range flame strike from her fist.^{[S1 ep 6]}^{[ch 16]} In the Japanese versions, she frequently ends her sentences with "de arimasu" (〜であります).^{[vol 2]} During the twelfth Nova Clash, where she is attacked by an image of her sister, Rana is able to "transcend". (Note: During the twelfth Nova Clash, some of the Pandoras experience delusions where they face images of their enemies or people they fear. When the Pandora is able to overcome that, she is said to "transcend", allowing her more powers including stronger attacks and healing.^{[vol 18]}) to become stronger.^{[vol 18]}
In a Funimation interview, Glass noted that Marchi tried to voice Rana with a patterned kind of speech, like an ESL student. Marchi liked that her character has a friendly rivalry with Satellizer, like they would fight each other but then share a bath together afterwards

== Supporting characters ==
=== West Genetics Academy ===
==== First and second-year students ====
Ganessa Roland (ガネッサ=ローランド, Ganessa Rōrando)
Voiced by: Eri Kitamura (Japanese); Luci Christian (English)^{[S1 ep 1]}
A second-year Pandora from the UK who wears her pink hair in twin tails.^{[ch 1]}^{[vol 4 cover]} She is known as the Angel of Binding (束縛の天使, Sokuaku no Tenshi).^{[S1 ep 1]}^{[S1 ep 2]} At the beginning of the series, she becomes the top-ranked second-year Pandora when she defeats Satellizer at the Carnival because of Kazuya's interference. She is easily angered and tends to let her pride get into her head sometimes, much to her Limiter Arthur's chagrin. While she sees herself as Satellizer's rival, she considers her a friend and comrade, and barely survives when she sacrifices herself to defend her against Nova Cathy.^{[S1 ep 12]}^{[ch 35]} Her Volt Weapon, Chains of Binding (束縛の鎖, Sokubaku no Rensa), consists of chained flails attached to her back which she can manipulate their movements and extend their lengths.^{[S1 ep 1]}^{[ch 1]} Despite her rank, she has yet to learn some of the high-end skills typical of third-year Pandoras.^{[S1 ep 11]} In Freezing: Pair Love Stories, Arthur describes her as too shy to show her kind side, likes to distance herself, yet strong enough to scold others, and willing to support someone from behind the scenes.^{[Pair vol 1]}
Arthur Clipton (アーサー=クリップトン, Āsā Kuripputon; alt. Arthur Crypton)
Voiced by: Nobuhiko Okamoto (Japanese); Chris Burnett (English)^{[S1 ep 1]}
Kazuya's next-door neighbor in the dorms who befriends him early in the series. He serves as Ganessa's Limiter, and enjoys fawning over her and treating her kindly. Because of Satellizer's reputation, he warns Kazuya to stay away from her, but stays friends with Kazuya regardless.^{[S1 ep 2]}^{[vol 1]} He and Kaho Hiiragi are friends, but he is attracted to Ganessa for her honesty and strength that she shows behind her sometimes distancing facade.^{[Pair vol 1]}
Kaho Hiiragi (ヒイラギ=カホ, Hiiragi Kaho)
Voiced by: Rumi Okubo (Japanese); Alexis Tipton (English)^{[S1 ep 1]}
Arthur and Kazuya's class representative.^{[S1 ep 3]}^{[ch 2]} Like Kazuya, she is also Japanese.^{[ch 2]} Her Volt Weapon, Dual Katana (デュアル･カタナ, Dyuaru Katana), is a pair of wakizashi.^{[ch 11]}
Audrey Duval (オードリー=デュバル, Ōdorī Dyubaru)
Voiced by: Mana Tsuzurahara (Japanese); Martha Harms (English)^{[S1 ep 1]}
A third-ranked second-year French Pandora,^{[S1 ep 1]} known as the Slice-and-Dice Maiden (斬撃の乙女, Zangeki no Otome). She has red shoulder-length hair with two long braids.^{[S1 ep 5]} Her Volt Weapon, Bolt Axe (ボルトアックス, Boruto Akkusu), is a poleaxe.^{[S1 ep 5]}
Aika Takeuchi (竹内 愛香/タケウチ=アイカ, Takeuchi Aika)
Voiced by: Eri Mimura^{[S1 ep 1]} (Japanese); Anastasia Muñoz (English)^{[S1 ep 5]}
The fifth-ranked second-year Japanese Pandora, known as Intoxicating Bondage (陶酔の銀幕, Tōsui no Ginmaku). She wears her hair in a brown ponytail.^{[S1 ep 5]} Her Volt Weapon is a chained flail.^{[S1 ep 5]}
Tris McKenzie (トリス=マッケンジー, Torisu Makkenjī)
Voiced by: Rie Yamaguchi (Japanese); Trina Nishimura (English)^{[S1 ep 1]}
The fourth-ranked second-year American Pandora with a tomboyish personality, known as the Twin Fang (双発の牙, Sōgami no Kiba). She has long brown hair and wears her shirt with an exposed midriff and jean shorts.^{[S1 ep 5]} Her Volt Weapon, Arondight (アロンダイト, Arondaito), is a pair of broadswords.^{[S1 ep 5]}

==== Third-year students ====
Chiffon Fairchild (シフォン=フェアチャイルド, Shifon Feachairudo)
Voiced by: Marina Inoue (Japanese); Cherami Leigh (English)^{[S1 ep 1]}
Chiffon is introduced as the student council president at West Genetics.^{[ch 1]} She has a bubbly personality, and is almost always seen with narrowed eyes and smiling. Her nickname is the Unparalleled Monster (不世出の怪物（モンスター）, Fuseishutsu no Monsutā; also Unparalleled Smiling Monster), ^{[S1 ep 12]}^{[vol 5]} or Monster (化け物, Bakemono) for short.^{[vol 12]}^{[First Chron]} It is later revealed that she is the top-ranked third-year student at West Genetics^{[S1 ep 7]} and the top rank among the five strongest third-year Pandoras at Genetics worldwide. She hails from Canada.^{[S1 ep 10]}
During the E-Pandora rebellion, she fights off Satellizer and Rana, easily subduing them.^{[vol 12]} She then refers to herself as a True Pandora, rather than a human.^{[vol 12]} Later, when she faces Nova Amelia, her eyes open for the first time in the series, revealing that she has "Type-Maria" eyes.^{[vol 13]} She sacrifices herself to absorb Nova Amelia's nuclear explosion.^{[vol 13]}^{[vol 14]} It is revealed that Chiffon is older than a teenager, having appeared in a photo dated from 40 years ago.^{[vol 16]} Lucy Renault reveals that she is one of the Legendary Pandoras.^{[vol 17]}
Chiffon has four stigmata; her special abilities include Illusion Turn, (Note: Illusion Turn (イリュージョンターン, Iryūjon Tān) is a high-end skill which increases a Pandora's speed further than Accel Turn, giving the impression that she instantly teleports from one point to another.)^{[S1 ep 7]} and switching to a controlled Nova Form (Note: Nova Form (ノヴァフォーム, Nova Fōmu) refers to Pandoras who have lost control to their stigmata. They can fashion Volt Weapons from their arms and can fire high-energy beams. In the eleventh Nova Clash, the Nova turn the East Genetics Pandora into Nova Forms, but they are able to return to normal after their controlling gem in their collar bone is destroyed. Very few Pandoras are able to revert to normal after assuming Nova Form.) at will.^{[ch 23]} Her Volt Weapon, Anti-Nova Trial Version (アンチノヴァ・トライアルバージョン, Anchi Nova Toraiaru Bājon), appears as a clawed gauntlet (or two), later revealed to be derived from Maria Lancelot's original weapon. Her Limiter is Yujin (ユ=ジン/柳 眞) (Voiced by: Shuhei Iwase (Japanese); Z. Charles Bolton (English)).^{[S1 ep 12]}^{[vol 5]}
The spin-off volume Freezing: First Chronicle highlights some events in Chiffon's first year at West Genetics, As Ticy's roommate, she encourages her in times of trouble and is observant of her schoolmates intentions, good or bad. She then establishes her reputation of being a monster by brutally defeating 50 Pandora in the school's summer Carnival, until she is stopped by Ticy, who wants her to return to her friendly ways. She reveals that she was told to always smile in order to find true happiness.^{[First Chron]}
Ticy Phenyl (ティシー=フェニール, Tishī Fenīru)
Voiced by: Aya Uchida (Japanese); Tia Ballard (English)^{[S1 ep 1]}
Ticy is introduced as the vice-president on the student council; she has long dark hair,^{[vol 14 cover]}^{[S1 ep 1]} and is from Finland.^{[S1 ep 10]} Ranking third in her school year, she is known as the Silent Confidant (質実剛健の懐刀, Futokorogatana).^{[S1 ep 12]}^{[vol 5]} Her Volt Weapon is a zanbatō (sword) and her Limiter is Abel Rotomaster (アベル, Aberu) (Voiced by: Ryuichi Maruyama (Japanese); Christopher Curtis (English)).^{[S1 ep 12]}^{[vol 5]}^{[Pair ch 4]} After Chiffon's death and Elizabeth's leave of absence from West Genetics, she becomes the new student council president, getting a haircut similar to Chiffon's and starts acting coldly towards others.^{[vol 14]} In the twelfth Nova Clash, she is haunted by the spirit of Chiffon, questioning her self-worth as a leader, until Elizabeth Mably returns and supports her.^{[vol 19]}^{[vol 20]} Afterwards, she acts more relaxed and friendlier towards others.
The Freezing: First Chronicle manga focuses on Ticy's first year at West Genetics. Initially nicknamed Zero Points for not participating in the students' spring Carnival, she is regularly bullied into doing errands by her schoolmates. After her roommate Chiffon supports her even when she is forced into doing things that would normally break their friendship, she is able to talk down Chiffon from her killing rampage during the fall Carnival. She grows strong enough to defend her third-place ranking in subsequent Carnivals by protecting Chiffon.^{[First Chron]}
Miyabi Kannazuki (カンナヅキ=ミヤビ, Kannazuki Miyabi; alt. Miyabi Kannaduki)
Voiced by: Natsuko Kuwatani (Japanese); Leah Clark (English)^{[S1 ep 2]}
Miyabi has short blue hair; she introduces herself as the Releaser of Chastity (貞操の解放者, Teisō no Kaihōsha), but she is derogatorily known as the Limiter Eater (新入りリミッター喰い, Shin'iri Rimittā Kui) for seducing Limiters then taking back her stigma when she tires of them. Her Volt Weapon, Homing Dagger (ホーミングダガー, Hōmingu Dagā), can split into several knives.^{[ch 2-3]} Although she employs three Limiters, she tries to seduce Kazuya, but when that fails, she defeats and sexually humiliates Satellizer, until Kazuya surprises her by casting a Freezing.^{[ch 3-4]}^{[S1 ep 3]} In First Chronicle, it is revealed she has four stigmata and that she had placed third in her first Carnival.^{[First Chron]} In Part 2, she leads one of the troops in the training exercises.^{[vol 17]}
Ingrid Bernstein (イングリッド=バーンシュタイン, Inguriddo Bānshutain)
Voiced by: Ami Koshimizu (Japanese); Brittney Karbowski (English)^{[S1 ep 3]}
Ingrid is the seventh-ranked Pandora;^{[ch 4]} she has long red hair and is from Germany.^{[vol 2 cover]}^{[S1 ep 4]} Known as the Protector of Order (秩序の守護者, Chitsujo no Shugosha), she punishes those who cause trouble and break the Academy rules. Her strong determination stems from an incident that happened during her second year at the Academy where her friend, Marin Maxwell, was killed by a Nova. After her battle with Satellizer, she learns the truth about Marin's death, and breaks down into tears. Her Volt Weapon, Divine Trust (ディバイン・トラスト, Dibain Torasuto), is a pair of bladed tonfas, and she uses third-year techniques such as Tempest Turn.^{[S1 ep 4]}^{[vol 2]} In the manga, she goes into Pandora Mode, (Note: Pandora Mode (パンドラモード, Pandora Mōdo) is a powered-up form used by higher-ranking Pandoras. In the manga, it appears as a powered armored suit. The mode only lasts about three minutes, but it enables the Pandoras to move around without the Freezing fields caused by the Limiters and Novas.) but almost loses herself, threatening to turn into a Nova Form.^{[vol 2]} Her Limiter is Leo Bernard (レオ=バーナード, Reo Bānādo) (Voiced by: Kazuyoshi Shiibashi (Japanese); Alexander Moran (English)).^{[S1 ep 3]}^{[vol 2]}^{[vol 5]}
Attia Simmons (アティア=シモンズ, Atia Shimonzu)
Voiced by: Kana Ueda^{[S1 ep 1]} (Japanese); Monica Rial (English)
Attia is a petite girl with silver hair in twin tails shaped like drills. Hailing from Italy,^{[S1 ep 6]} she ranks sixth among the Pandoras in her school year.^{[vol 5]} As the Architect of Evil (魔性の策士, Mashō no Sakushi), she tricks Rana into fighting Satellizer,^{[S1 ep 6]}^{[vol 5]} and later has Arnett and Creo beat up Satellizer and Rana.^{[S1 ep 7]}^{[vol 3]} After Elizabeth orders the third-years to not fight Satellizer anymore, she plots schemes to humiliate her, including trying to have her drink an "over 90% cocktail",^{[ch 38]} and, in the anime, she provides a skimpy coronation outfit during the school's Pandora Queen beauty contest.^{[S1 ep 8]} Her Volt Weapon, "Elegant Glory" (エレガンテ・クォレ, Eregante Kwore; also "Elegant Cuore" or "Morning Star"), is a combination of the morning star and a meteor hammer.^{[S1 ep 11]} She tends to refer to her group of friends as a team (e.g. Team Arnett, Team Elizabeth).^{[S1 ch 96]}^{[vol 16]} Her Limiter is Mark Anthony (マーク, Māku) (Voiced by: Kaito Aoi (Japanese); Kyle Phillips (English)).^{[vol 5]}
Attia ranked 15th on a list of the top 34 characters with drill styled hair by anime website GoBoiano.
Arnett McMillan (アーネット=マックミルラン, Ānetto Makkumiruran)
Voiced by: Yu Asakawa (Japanese); Jad Saxton (English)^{[S1 ep 1]}
A fourth-ranked Pandora from Switzerland with rose-colored hair styled in a long ponytail,^{[vol 8 cover]}^{[ch 17]} Arnett is known as the Slashing Trickster (暫撃のトリックスター, Zangeki no Torikkusutā).^{[S1 ep 7]}^{[vol 5]} She wields a scythe called Scythe Machina (サイスマキナー, Saisu Makinā) as her Volt Weapon.^{[ch 17]} Her Start Double Accel allows her to attack from directions not perceivable.^{[S1 ep 7]}^{[vol 4]} In a side story, it is revealed that she originally enrolled at West Genetics due to her high (80%) compatibility with stigmata. Her nickname back then was Mad Dog. Because of her poor background, she despises upper-class girls, picking fights with upperclassmen, until she is befriended by Elizabeth.^{[ch 65.5]} After Chiffon's death, she fights Ticy in a duel to decide the next student council president.^{[vol 14]} During the twelfth Nova Clash, she gets corrupted by the Nova to attack Team 13, but is defeated by Roxanne.^{[vol 18]} She helps fight the Nova Commander but is defeated and later revived by Windy May.^{[vol 20]} Her Limiter is Morrison Abebe (モリソン, Morison).^{[vol 5]}
Creo Brand (クレオ=ブランド, Kureo Burando)
Voiced by: Izumi Kitta (Japanese); Liza Gonzales (English)^{[S1 ep 7]}
A fifth-ranked Pandora from Germany, with short silver hair and a dark complexion, Creo is known as the Lightning Hammer (電光の鉄槌, Raikō no Kanaduchi).^{[S1 ep 7]} Her Volt Weapon, Infinity Fang (インフィニティファング, Infiniti Fangu), is a pair of steel-plated gloves.^{[S1 ep 7]}^{[ch 17]}She is able to perform Tempest Turns and other high-end maneuvers without having to power up beforehand.^{[S1 ep 7]}^{[vol 4]} During her first and second year at West Genetics she was quite short, even shorter than Attia and that caused her discomfort, specially with her juniors, but in her third year she became one of the tallest Pandoras in the series.^{[Pair]} Her Limiter is Goro Itsuki (イツキ=ゴロウ, Itsuki Gorō)^{[vol 5]}^{[Pair vol 1]}.
Elizabeth Mably (エリザベス=メイブリー, Erizabesu Meiburī)
Voiced by: Yuko Kaida (Japanese); Tia Ballard (English)
Known as the Executor of Ingenious Schemes (神算鬼謀の執行者, Shinsankibō no Shikkōsha; lit. Academy Reigning Enforcer) and the second-ranked Pandora in her year,^{[S1 ep 11]}^{[vol 5]} Elizabeth is well-respected among the third-years who maintain the Academy's hierarchy and who punish those who break them. She has long blonde hair ^{[vol 6 cover]} and hails from the United Kingdom.^{[S1 ep 8]} When she hears news of Miyabi's defeat at the hands of Satellizer early in the series, she has Attia to take care of the matter,^{[S1 ep 3]} but after Satellizer demonstrates that she is able to defeat her classmates, she orders the third-years to withdraw.^{[vol 4]}
Despite her tough stance on hierarchy, she feels she has a noblesse oblige to look after those who do not have power like her family.^{[vol 10]} She plays a major role in the E-Pandora storyline (also covered in Freezing Vibration), where she befriends Amelia and the E-Pandora girls, and supports their cause when they are being used and abused for some controversial experiments. She tries to get her family to initiate investigations on the Chevalier, but the Chevalier arrest and torture her, and smear her family's name.^{[vol 10]} Despite this, she continues to support Amelia in the E-Pandora Rebellion, dueling with Charles. Following the eleventh Nova Clash, she takes a leave of absence from West Genetics,^{[vol 14]} later returning for the twelfth Nova Clash to assist Ticy.^{[vol 19]}
Elizabeth's Volt Weapon is the Stigma Satellite System (スティグマ・サテライト・システム, Sutiguma Sateraito Shisutemu; "SSS"), a pair of drones the size of softballs that fire energy beams or create a barrier.^{[S1 ep 11]}^{[ch 32]} Given enough time, it can power up to fire Volt Longinus, which she uses to defeat Charles during the E-Pandora rebellion.^{[ch 76]} Her Limiter is Andrei Francoise (アンドレ・フランソワーズ, Andore Furansowāzu)^{[S1 ep 11]}^{[ch 32]}, who, in the battle against Charles, sacrifices his eyesight to support Elizabeth.^{[vol 12]}
Among other interests, the Mably family also runs a cosmetics firm and a winery;^{[ch 38]} a running gag has her offer items to other Pandoras at a corporate discount.^{[ch 56]}^{[ch 65.5]} In the anime, she was the former winner of the Pandora Queen beauty contest, and often swims in the nude.^{[S1 ep 8]}^{[S2 ep 3]}

==== Staff and alumni ====
Sister Margaret (シスター・マーガレット, Shisutā Māgaretto)
Voiced by: Rieko Takahashi (Japanese); Dusty Jacks (English)^{[S1 ep 1]}
A nun who is the principal of West Genetics.^{[ch 1]} In her youth, Margaret was a renowned Pandora of the Chevalier. Her Volt Weapon took the form of a pair of blunted tonfas. As an elite soldier, she was one of the first Pandora to use Pandora Mode, which she used to almost single-handedly destroy a Type-F Nova, although doing so injured her greatly.
Yumi Kim (金 由美/キム=ユミ, Kimu Yumi)
Voiced by: Akeno Watanabe (Japanese); Carmen Smith (English)^{[S1 ep 1]}
A physics teacher and training instructor from Korea^{[S1 ep 11]} at West Genetics. She fought alongside Kazuha and Elise in the eighth Nova Clash as part of the elite Numbers (ナンバーズ, Nanbāzu) unit.^{[S1 ep 1]}^{[ch 2]} Her Volt Weapon, Getsurō (月浪; "Moon Wave"), is a lance.^{[S1 ep 10]} During her second year as a Pandora, she had a fierce rivalry with Elise, with culminated in both of them fighting to pair with the Limiter Max Hamilton (who ironically ended up paired with their mutual friend Shion Nayfield), but after sometime they became friends.^{[Pair vol 1]} She was the student council president during her third year as a Pandora, and despite a harsh beginning, she became a friend of Kazuha Aoi.
Elise Schmitz (エリズ=シュミッツ, Erizu Shumittsu)
Voiced by: Fumie Mizusawa (Japanese); Stephanie Young (English)^{[S1 ep 1]}
A green-haired German^{[S1 ep 11]} doctor and former Pandora who fought in the eighth Nova Clash alongside Kazuha and Kim in the Numbers unit.^{[ch 2]} She now works at West Genetics and is responsible for healing the Pandoras when they are injured in combat.^{[S1 ep 1]}^{[S1 ep 2]} Her Volt Weapon, Doppelganger (ドッペルゲンガー, Dopperugengā), is a pair of twin daggers.^{[S1 ep 10]} During her student days in West Genetics, Elize was known to be a very laid-back person in comparison to her close friend Yumi; who was mostly always serious.^{[Pair vol 1]} She and Yumi were roommates during their third year and she also became a friend of Kazuha Aoi when she joined West Genetics, despite her harsh first encounter with Yumi.
Kazuha Aoi (アオイ=カズハ, Aoi Kazuha)
Voiced by: Mamiko Noto (Japanese); Catherine DuBord (English)^{[S1 ep 1]}
Kazuya's older sister was the most powerful Pandora at the time of the eighth Nova Clash. She is said to have sacrificed herself at the Nova Clash to save her friends. Much of her body was composed of stigmata tissue, which allowed 20 stigmata to be implanted into her body,^{[S1 ep 9]}^{[ch 13]} but she was consumed by them and was in the process of turning into a Nova Form before her death.^{[ch 29]}^{[S1 ep 10]} Because of this, the higher-ups started limiting the number of stigmata a Pandora can have.^{[S1 ep 10]} Six of her stigmata (also known as Sacreds (英痕, also Hero's stigmata)) were given to Satellizer,^{[S1 ep 9]} three (six in the anime) to Cathy,^{[S1 ep 9]}^{[S1 v5]} two to Charles Bonaparte, two to Julia Munberk, and one to Roxanne Elipton.^{[S1 v5]} The first volume of the prequel manga Freezing Zero depicts her early years as a Pandora.^{[FZ v1]}
Marin Maxwell (マリン=マックスウェル, Marin Makkusuweru)
Voiced by: Akira Kasahara (Japanese); Shelly Osterberger (English)^{[S1 ep 4]}
Ingrid's late friend. A second-year Pandora, she died fighting off a Nova to allow first-year students under her command to retreat. Her death was the cause of Ingrid's obsession with rules and hierarchy. Albert was her limiter.^{[S1 ep 4]}^{[vol 2]}
Mi-Ryung Baek (ベク=ミリョン, Beku Miryon)
A former cadet Pandora in her junior year at West Genetics in 2060, when she came in first at the spring Carnival. She missed out being selected for the Numbers squad, due to the family connections of Kazuha Aoi, who got the place instead, even though she finished last. A friend of Yumi since her freshman year and although at first she disliked Kazuha, after being saved by her in an incident that involved a fake Nova, they became friends alongside Yumi, Elize and Saeko Kotou, her former rival. She serves as the gym teacher at West Genetics.
Shion Nayfield (シオン=ネイフィールド, Shion Neifīrudo)
A third-year Pandora during the time of the enrollment of Kazuha Aoi, and a member of Numbers unit. She is also a teammate of Elize Schmitz and Yumi Kim.^{[Pair vol 1]} Her unnamed Volt Weapon takes the shape of a pair of gauntlets with matching boots, making her a close-combat type. She took a liking towards Kazuha and became her friend, she also enjoyed to tease Yumi alongside Elize. Currently she is Howard el Bridget's assistant.

=== Other Genetics academies ===
Some of the characters come from Genetics (ゼネティックス, Zenetikkusu) academies from all over the world. In addition to the West Genetics and East Genetics academies in Japan, there are schools in the United Kingdom (named UK), America (US), France (L.D.T.), Germany (Panzer), China (Phi Buster), Korea (South / North, KR in the anime), and India (Chakra).^{[ch 53]}^{[S2 ep 1]}^{[S2 ep 2]}

Cathy Lockharte (キャシー=ロックハート, Kyashī Rokkuhāto; alt. Cassie Lockheart)
Voiced by: Rie Kugimiya (Japanese); Kristi Kang (English)^{[S1 ep 9]}
The top-ranked third-year Pandora at East Genetics, known as Godspeed of the East (イーストの神速, Īsuto no Shinsoku) for her Quadruple Acceleration technique and considered to be the most powerful Pandora at her academy. She has green hair^{[vol 5 cover]} and hails from the United States.^{[S1 ep 9]} Despite having the highest synchronization rate with Kazuha's stigmata (90%), and receiving three of them (six in the anime). Cathy does not feel she is the most powerful Pandora, and believes herself to be undeserving of the title after she fought with Satellizer during the Leevon incident, which made her realize how weak and scared she was compared to Satellizer's determination and refusal to give up despite the large gap in skill between them which causes her to flee. As a child, she wanted to be a novelist, but her father forced her to attend East Genetics to become a Pandora for his political career. Her encounter with Satellizer made her change her mind, in which she decides to settle down with her Limiter Kyoichi Minase (水瀬 恭一, Minase Kyōichi) (Voiced by: Hiroyuki Endo (Japanese); Scott Freeman (English)), a second-year student.^{[S1 ep 9]}^{[vol 5]}^{[vol 9]}
When four Type-S Novas attacked East Genetics, she, along with several of her Pandora comrades (including Milena) were absorbed by one of the Novas,^{[S1 ep 9]} and turned into Nova Form Pandoras, which in turn attack the Pandoras of West Genetics.^{[S1 ep 10]}^{[vol 5]} She fights a long and grueling battle with Satellizer, nearly killing her until she is beaten by the latter's ability to assume Nova Form.^{[S1 ep 12]} Her Volt Weapon is a pair of arm-mounted blades called Halcyon (ファルシオン, Farushion; also "Falchion").^{[S1 ep 9]} She later joins the Pandoras in Alaska on the E-Pandora project. In chapter 69, Julia considers Cathy the fifth overall among the top five worldwide third-year Pandoras.^{[ch 69]} In Part 2, she trains at West Genetics as part of Team 13.^{[vol 15]}
Milena Marius (ミレーナ=マリウス, Mirēna Mariusu)
Voiced by: Sayaka Ohara (Japanese); Lydia Mackay (English)^{[S1 ep 9]}
A fourth-year student and Chevalier at East Genetics and Cassie's best friend.^{[ch 25-26]} She was one of the many Pandoras infected into Nova Form during the tenth Nova Clash at West Genetics until she was defeated by Chiffon.^{[vol 5]} Her Volt Weapon is a drill lance.^{[S1 ep 11]} In the anime, she is an instructor at East Genetics and Cassie's teacher.^{[S1 ep 9]} Her Limiter is Alex Browning (アレックス=ブラウニング, Arekkusu Barauningu)^{[vol 5]}

Louis el Bridget (ルイス=エル=ブリジット, Ruisu Eru Burijitto)
Voiced by: Asami Sanada (Young/Teen), Kenji Nojima (adult) (Japanese); Lara Woodhull (young), Ryan Reynolds (teen), Austin Tindle (adult) (English)^{[S1 ep 7]}
Satellizer's younger half-brother and the youngest sibling of the El Bridget family. He first meets Satellizer when he was eight years old, but has a low opinion of her, thinking of her as his personal toy. His tormenting turns into sexual abuse, resulting in her fear of being touched, until Violet removes her from the manor.^{[ch 20]} He reappears in the Bali storyline where he has been attending Genetics UK and serves as a Limiter for Holly Rose. Although Violet thinks he has changed his ways, he soon reveals that he is still sadistic, ruthless and obsessed with Satellizer, treating Holly as just a substitute. He blackmails Satellizer into being his toy again, tells Kazuya to break off the partnership, ^{[vol 7]} and directs the jealous Holly to kill Kazuya. However, when he tells Holly he never loved her, Holly stabs him in a murder suicide attempt, but they are saved by Satellizer. He realizes he can not control Satellizer anymore; he then tries to reconcile with Holly.^{[vol 8]}
Theron Martin of Anime News Network awarded Louis the title of being the "Biggest Bastard" of anime in 2013, as "We knew from the first series that Satellizer became known as "the Untouchable Queen" largely because Louis's molestation of her had left her unable to tolerate anyone's touch, but one two-episode mid-season arc here portrays how he did it, and the control methods he uses to bend Satellizer to his will [...] so vividly and reprehensibly that him somewhat reforming, rather than being offed, at the end of the arc is unquestionably the series' biggest disappointment." Marks Spencer, also from Freezing, was another contender.
Holly Rose (ホーリー=ローズ, Hōrī Rōzu)
Voiced by: Hiroko Kusunoki (Japanese); Felecia Angelle (English)
The top third-year Pandora at Genetics UK, she resembles Satellizer except for her silver hair.^{[vol 7 cover]} She secretly has an abusive relationship with her Limiter Louis, who used his family's influence to make her his Pandora. Despite enduring the abuse, and the realization that she is but a substitute toy for Satellizer, Holly does love him and despises Satellizer.^{[vol 7]} During their fight, she confesses her love to Louis, and wants him to do the same, even if it is a lie, but when Louis replies that he never did love her, she stabs him in a murder-suicide attempt, but they are saved by Satellizer, after which they reconcile. Her Volt Weapon is a longsword. She is able to do high-end maneuvers such as No-Interval and Triple Accels.^{[vol 7]}^{[vol 8]}
Roxanne Elipton (ロックサヌ=エリプトン, Rokkusanu Eriputon)
Voiced by: Aimi (Japanese); Angela Chase (English)^{[S2 ep 1]}
Known as the Immortal (不死身, Fushisha),^{[S2 ep 1]} she is the top Pandora from Genetics America, and the second highest among third-year Pandoras world-wide.^{[vol 9]} She has rose-colored hair where the bottom is styled around her neck.^{[vol 13 cover]}^{[S2 ep 1]} Her Limiter is Shi-Jing Hong (ハン=シジン, Han Shijin).^{[vol 9]} She is reputed to be able to regenerate her body;^{[ch 26]}^{[vol 9]} that Charles calls her Zombie Girl (ゾンビ女, Zonbi Shōjo)^{[S2 ep 1]} and Undead (アンデッド, Andeddo)^{[S2 ep 1]}.
In Part 2, she joins the newly formed Team 13 alongside the Valkyries as they were to be a special Anti-Nova Unit.^{[vol 15]} During the joint exercise which became the twelfth Nova clash, she and Charles are able to dispel their illusions by reducing their stigmata synchronizations.^{[vol 17]}^{[vol 18]} She uses the Fairchild Buster, a Volt Weapon consisting of a pair of gauntlet claws and arm guards.^{[vol 18]} Although she is able to defeat Nova Arnett,^{[vol 18]} she is later caught by the Nova Commander and converted to a Nova Form.^{[vol 20]} She fights her control and self-destructs, but is miraculously restored by Windy May.^{[vol 21]}
Charles Bonaparte (シャルル=ボナパルト, Sharuru Bonaparuto)
Voiced by: Rikako Yamaguchi (Japanese); Megan White (English)^{[S2 ep 1]}
Known as the Young Tempest Phoenix (テンペストの鳳雛, Tenpesuto no Hōsū),^{[S2 ep 1]} a Pandora from Genetics France (L.D.T.) who is an advanced user of the Tempest Turn technique, being able to create eight copies of herself.^{[ch 26]}^{[vol 10]} She has short blonde hair, and is usually seen wearing headphones.^{[vol 10 cover]} She is also petite in height, that Roxanne calls her pipsqueak.^{[S2 ep 3]} She is the adopted daughter of Marks Spencer, who saved her from a gang of teenagers,^{[ch 74]} and who wanted her to be a Pandora because of her high compatibility rate with stigmata. She loves and believes in her father very much, and becomes a Pandora to support him.^{[ch 75]} She ranked fourth out of the top five strongest third-year Pandoras at Genetics worldwide.^{[ch 26]} During the E-Pandora rebellion, she fights Elizabeth, whom she thinks is a traitor for supporting the rebels.^{[vol 12]} Her Volt Weapon, Vibrato Hell (ビブラート・ヘル, Biburāto Heru), is a pair of trench knives. Citroën (シトロエン, Shitoroen) is her Limiter.^{[vol 10]}
In Part 2, she joins the newly formed Team 13 as a Striker.^{[vol 15]} Because of the events in Alaska, she does not want to be friends with her teammates, and is irritated to violence when the subjects of her father, Elizabeth, or her own height are brought up.^{[vol 16]} During the twelfth Nova Clash, she loses her arm against Nova Arnett^{[vol 18]} and the other one against a saurian Nova,^{[vol 20]} but the limbs are miraculously restored by Windy May.^{[vol 21]}
Julia Munberk (ユリア=ムンベルク, Yuria Munberuku)
Voiced by: Hisako Tōjō (Japanese); Sarah Wiedenheft (English)^{[S2 ep 1]}
Known as the Maverick of Walpurgis (異端児, Itanji),^{[S2 ep 1]} a Pandora from Genetics Germany (Panzer) with short blue hair in a ponytail.^{[vol 10 cover]}^{[S2 ep 2]} She is one of the top five strongest third-year Pandoras at Genetics worldwide, being ranked third. Her Volt Weapon is a Stigma Satellite System of two sickles that launch omnidirectional shock waves.^{[ch 26]}^{[ch 72]} In the anime, she likes to grab the girls' breasts to assess their sizes, mostly Cathy.^{[S2 ep 2]}^{[S2 ep 3]}

=== Chevalier ===
Chevalier (シュヴァリエ, Shuvarie) is an organization dedicated to fighting the Novas, developing the Pandoras, stigmata, and limiter classes, and founding the Genetics academies. Its members include their schools' fourth-year students.^{[S1 ep 9]}^{[ch 14]}

==== Staff ====
Scarlet Ohara (スカーレット=大原, Sukāretto Ōhara)
Voiced by: Satsuki Yukino (Japanese); Krishna Smitha (English)^{[S2 ep 1]}
Ohara is the founder and chief researcher of the E-Pandora Project.^{[vol 9]} She believes that Chevalier should use all of first Pandora Maria Lancelot's genes, which causes conflict with Gengo Aoi and her subsequent dismissal. She detests that the E-Pandoras are treated as expendable lab animals, but complies with the Chevalier council's wishes, believing her work will redeem the sacrifices.^{[vol 10]}^{[vol 11]} After failing with the Mark III drug, she develops the Mark IV to buy time for her actual project, a set of Maria Lancelot clones.^{[vol 13]} Having ignored Amelia's wishes to not abuse her friends multiple times, she is confronted by Amelia one last time where the latter transforms into a full-sized Nova.^{[vol 13]} She survives the consequent destruction, but her legs are damaged. Upon the closure of the project, she and Marks Spencer take the blame for the eleventh Nova Clash and are arrested.^{[vol 14]} She is later recruited by Gengo Aoi to help in his Plasma Stigmata project.^{[vol 22]}
Gengo Aoi (アオイ=源吾, Aoi Gengo)
Voiced by: Atsushi Ono (Japanese); R. Bruce Elliott (English)^{[S2 ep 1]}
Kazuya's grandfather and chief scientist of the Chevalier.^{[ch 27]}^{[vol 9]} He is the one who developed the Pandoras, Limiters, and stigmata with Maria Lancelot as his test subject. He believes that Maria is a gift from the Heavens, that they are only borrowing her power, and that it would be hubris to take the research too far or believe that all the advancements discovered are solely due to human efforts. After the failure of Ohara's E-Pandora project, Gengo starts the Valkyrie Project that makes use of the newly developed Injection Stigmata.^{[vol 15]} He later reveals that he was behind the Lab 13 Experiments to create the Legendary Pandora, who are the prototypes for the Pandora Project.^{[vol 21]} He develops the Legend Stigmata project, recruiting Atsuko Seiga and Scarlet Ohara.^{[vol 21]}^{[vol 22]}
Marks Spencer (マークス=スペンサー, Mākusu Supensā)
Voiced by: Takashi Matsuyama (Japanese); David Wald (English)
A former vice-director of Chevalier, he is asked to oversee the E-Pandora Project with Ohara. He is Charles Bonaparte's adoptive father.^{[ch 74-75]} Following the failure of the E-Pandora project and the resulting eleventh Nova Clash, he is arrested.^{[vol 14]}
Suna Lee (リースナ, Rī Suna)
Voiced by: Fūko Saitō (Japanese); Mary Morgan (English)
A lieutenant hailing from Korea and one of the strongest Pandora of the Chevalier.^{[ch 59]} In Part 2, she joins the newly formed Team 13 alongside the Valkyries as their captain. She also serves as the live-in bodyguard and assistant to Gengo Aoi.^{[vol 15]} In the twelfth Nova Clash, Gengo has her awaken the remaining Legendary Pandoras from their slumber.^{[vol 19]}^{[vol 20]} She was in the 25th generation class of West Genetics and was a rival of Isuzu Sawatari.^{[vol 22]} In the Busters storyline, she faces Sawatari again when she tries to protect Gengo.^{[vol 25]}

==== Evolution Pandoras ====
The Evolution Pandora (エボリューション・パンドラ, Eboryūshon Pandora) (E-Pandora) project's goal is to make Pandoras out of ordinary girls who do not naturally exhibit compatibility with stigmata.^{[vol 9]} Their story is covered in volumes 9-14 in the manga series and the Freezing Vibration anime.

Amelia Evans (アミリア=エヴァンス, Amiria Evansu)
Voiced by: Suzuko Mimori (Japanese); Whitney Rodgers (English)^{[S2 ep 2]}
Amelia is an Evolution Pandora with a red tuft at the front of her long silver hair;^{[vol 9 cover]} she says she is about three times stronger than other E-Pandoras. Unlike the other E-Pandoras, she is able to manifest a Volt Weapon lance in her battle against Elizabeth. She can use Double Accel, but in her first spar with the Pandoras, she is easily defeated by Elizabeth. However, she has a very strong will and continues to fight even after she is beaten badly and given a concussion that she ends up standing unconscious.^{[vol 9]}^{[S2 ep 2]} She was the first to try the Mark III drug, which was a failure and almost killed her. She joined the program to help her younger brother who is in a wheelchair. After her comrade Jina goes berserk as a Nova Form from the Mark IV drug,^{[vol 10]} and after learning that all her E-Pandora friends are being ordered to take the drug, she leads a rebellion of the E-Pandoras.^{[vol 11]} When she discovers from Ohara that the project was actually a smokescreen for cloning the first Pandora, Maria Lancelot,^{[vol 13]} she loses control of herself and turns into a full-fledged Nova, who tries to kill everyone in a rage.^{[vol 13]} While battling with Chiffon, she attempts to self-destruct in a nuclear explosion, but Chiffon absorbs the blast, dying in the process, but saving Amelia.^{[vol 14]} After treatment, she reappears in a later storyline as Ohara's aide and bodyguard,^{[ch 150]} saving Gengo and Suna from the assassin Isuzu Sawatari.
Jina Purpleton (ジーナ=パープルトン, Jīna Pāpuruton)
Voiced by: Izumi Kitta (Japanese); Milly Prower (English)^{[S2 ep 2]}
Jina is the second E-Pandora to spar with the original Pandoras; she has short purple hair. She uses a pole but is easily defeated by Jung Ara. She became an Evolution Pandora after being sold off by her parents.^{[vol 9]}^{[S2 ep 2]} She is the first to try the Mark IV drug, which at first gave her a successful demonstration, however, her body degenerates and turns her into an uncontrollable Nova Form.^{[vol 9]} She tells Amelia that the Mark IV drug was a sham. Although she is able to fight Elizabeth, she is consequently killed by Charles Bonaparte.^{[vol 10]}^{[S2 ep 4]}
Rattle (ラトル, Ratoru)
Voiced by: Yūki Kuwahara (Japanese); Megan Shipman (English)^{[S2 ep 2]}
Rattle has dark hair and a tan complexion. She became an Evolution Pandora so she would not have to be hungry anymore. Her Volt Weapon is a pair of chakrams. She is the first E-Pandora to spar with the original Pandoras, but is defeated easily.^{[vol 9]}^{[S2 ep 2]} She is presumed to have died during the E-Pandora rebellion, according to a retrospect by Amelia.^{[ch 150]}

==== Valkyries ====
The Valkyries are a second generation of ordinary girls who are able to become Pandoras, but instead of taking on stigmata with a Mark IV drug, they use Injection Stigmata, which gives them the abilities of the original Pandoras but without the corrosive side effects that the E-Pandoras experienced. They are given Plasma Weapons which are their equivalent to Volt Weapons.^{[vol 17]}

Ouka Tenjouin (天上院 桜花, Tenjōin Ōka)
Introduced as Ouka Honda (桜花=ホンダ, Ōka Honda), hailing from Japan, she is Kazuya's maternal cousin, and the granddaughter of Gengo Aoi who became a Valkyrie in order to be with Kazuya. She refers to Kazuya as "big brother" even though they are about the same age. Prior to the series, she made a promise to Kazuha to look after him; and thus declares herself Kazuya's fiancée, even though Kazuya has openly responded that he does not love her. She calls Kazuya's relationship with Satellizer and Rana "impure" and thus sparks a rivalry between herself and the two girls for Kazuya's affection.^{[vol 15]}^{[vol 17]} She uses a technique called Tachyon Accel.^{[vol 17]}
Lucy Renault (ルーシー=ルノー, Rūshī Runō)
Originating from France, Lucy has long, silver purple hair.^{[vol 19 cover]} The night before the joint exercise, she confronts Kazuya and reveals that she, along with Chiffon and other girls, is one of Kazuya's aunts. She was brought in to the Valkyries at Gengo's request.^{[vol 17]} She stays quiet most of her time during the Valkyries but is more talkative after her sisters appear.^{[ch 151]} She is capable of decapitating a Humanoid-Type Nova with her bare hands. She can also fire beams of energy that annihilate Nova. When her sisters Windy May and Teslad turn into N3 Novas and the Valkyries engage them, she remains unimpressed with her comrades' new prowess.^{[vol 24]}
Franka Porsche (フランカ=ポルシェ, Furanka Porushe)
Hailing from Germany, she wears glasses and has braided hair. When she first meets Kazuya, she acts flirty and wants to do research on him.^{[vol 15]} Franka's Plasma Weapon resembles the large arm guards of a giant robot. When combined with Tiziana's weapon, she can fire a cannon beam at her opponent.^{[vol 18]}
Christine Evora (クリスティン=エヴォーラ, Kurisutin Evōra)
Christine is from Great Britain; she has light hair that is curled in twin drills like Attia's but pointing sideways.^{[vol 17 cover]} Her Plasma Weapon is a composed set of gauntlets, strong enough to deflect the dummy Nova's attacks.^{[vol 18]} She arrives just in time to save Rana from Windy, but despite her and Ouka's enhancements, Lucy looks down on them, stating their fake "Legendary Stigmata" are not enough to defeat her sisters.^{[vol 24]}
Tiziana Ferrari (ティチアナ=フェラーリ, Tichiana Ferāri)
A Valkyrie with shoulder-length brown hair,^{[vol 18 cover]} hailing from Italy. She has a shy personality and a large chest.^{[vol 15]} Her Plasma Weapon is of the Stigma Satellite System type.^{[vol 18]}

=== Other Pandoras ===
Maria Lancelot (マリア=ランスロット, Maria Ransurotto)
The first Pandora, known as the Mother of all Pandoras, as all stigmata used by other Pandoras and Limiters were fragments of her body.^{[S1 ep 10]}^{[S1 ep 11]} Her "holy remains" reside deep within West Genetics' underground chamber, the Ravensborne Nucleochede (レヴェンスボルン・ヌクレオチド, Revensuborun Nukureochide), and was the main target of the Nova in the tenth Nova Clash.^{[S1 ep 10]}^{[vol 5]} She was the one who warned mankind about the Nova's invasion. Her origins are a mystery as she first materialized on Earth before Gengo Aoi. She is the mother of Ryuuichi Aoi, thus being Kazuya and Kazuha's grandmother as well, which could explain the high concentration of stigmata tissue into their bodies, and her DNA was used for the creation of the Legendary Pandoras as well. She was reintroduced to Scarlett Ohara by Gengo while he told her why he couldn't return Scarlett's feelings, he reveals the Top Secret: Maria is alive and is cognizant of what is going on. She revealed her knowledge to Scarlett, and gave her the incentive to finish the Plasma Stigmata project.

==== Legendary Pandoras ====
The first Pandoras who were created from the DNA of Gengo Aoi and Maria Lancelot. They are known as the Sisters of Lab 13 (ラボ13の姉妹, Rabo 13 no shimai). Their bodies are composed mostly of stigmata tissue. In addition to Chiffon Fairchild and Lucy Renault, there are three Legendary Pandoras who were placed in suspended animation until the twelfth Nova Clash when they were released to defeat the Novas.^{[vol 20]}^{[vol 21]}

Cassandra (カサンドラ, Kasandora)
Cassandra has long blonde hair that she uses a large jagged hair clip to hold back.^{[vol 20 cover]} As Kazuya's aunt, she took care of him until he was two years old, and still treats him that way, offering him to feast on her breasts.^{[vol 21]} In battles, she wields an even larger version of Satellizer's Nova Blood, and can fire particle beams that devastate enemy Nova.^{[vol 21]} She saves Kazuya from the Busters and manages to heal everyone, but once Jessica Edwin uses her Anti-Freezing to stop her and Isabella Lucas tries to kill her, she remains unscathed, but the Anti-Freezing field causes her to hear an alien message to kill everyone that is not one of them, at which she then is classified as a N3 Nova.^{[vol 24]} She effortlessly stands the attacks of the Busters and after permanently blowing the arm of Isabella, she acts as a beacon to summon five N3 Nova.^{[vol 25]}
Windy May (ウィンディ月, Windi Mayu)
Windy has pink hair styled in twin tails;^{[vol 21 cover]} she has a bright and energetic personality, and is rarely seen without a smile on her face, even during the midst of battle. In the twelfth Nova Clash, she takes an energy blast from the Nova commander at point-blank range, but does not sustain injury, and then lops off the commander's head with a simple swing of her large mallet. She heals the fallen Pandoras, restoring Charles's limbs, and even reviving Roxanne who self-destructed the upper half of her body.^{[vol 21]} When the Busters attack, she has the upper hand against Petty Layner, but when Sawatari uses her Anti-Freezing technique, she and Teslad become N3 Novas. As the Busters flee, Nova Windy beheads a Chevalier Pandora with her hands in front of Rana, and faces the Valkyries, with Rana personally facing her.^{[vol 24]}
Teslad (テスラド, Tesurado)
She has medium length dark purple hair.^{[vol 22 cover]} Her weapon is a pair of bladed tonfas that can unleash sonic waves to cut down her enemies.^{[vol 21]} She stays quiet, preferring to just stare intently when she wants something.^{[ch 151]} In the attack from the Busters, she, too, transforms into an N3 Nova as a result of the Anti-Freezing from Sawatari, ending up fighting her sister Lucy.^{[vol 24]}

==== Busters ====
A group of highly skilled Pandoras that were relieved from duty because of their criminal acts; they are gathered by the Chevalier leader in an attempt to assassinate Gengo Aoi after the latter's betrayal.^{[vol 22]} Equipped with the unstable and experimental Plasma Stigmata, their abilities are considered to be comparable with Chiffon Fairchild's, and they are enabled with a powerful "Anti-Freezing" ability comparable to Kazuha Aoi's.^{[vol 23]}^{[vol 24]} The Busters are recruited by an ex-Chevalier leader, Raddox Phantomime.^{[vol 23]} However, their mission turns to the worse when they face the Legendary Pandoras, who transform themselves into Novas thanks to an unexpected reaction to their Anti-Freezing, becoming a threat to friends and foes alike.

Petty Layner (ペティ=ライナー, Peti Rainā)
Petty is introduced as a prisoner in Arizona with a 210-year sentence for attacking a Pandora until she was unable to move, and killing her Limiter.^{[ch 149]} She has shoulder-length dark blue hair.^{[vol 24 cover]} Prideful, foul-mouthed and sadistic with a habit of taunting her opponents. Her Volt weapon is a pair of reinforced gauntlets.^{[ch 153]} In the invasion of West Genetics, she challenges and easily beats Sawatari to assume leadership of the Busters. She then beats the Genetics Pandoras,^{[vol 23]} but when she faces the Legendary Pandoras, she is humiliated by Windy May, and flees when the Legendary Pandoras go berserk. After seeing that Sawatari ditched her, she tries to fight her again, but is easily defeated and then killed.^{[vol 24]}
Jessica Edwin (ジェシカ=エドウィン, Jeshika Edowin)
Incarcerated for killing her parents and attempting to murder her brother, Jessica was serving a 350-year sentence in New Alcatraz when she is recruited into Busters.^{[ch 149]} Her weapon is a pair of knives.^{[ch 153]} She rarely speaks, and her cold expression hardly changes. In the invasion of West Genetics, she and Isabella fight the Genetics Pandoras,^{[vol 23]} easily slicing off Ticy's arms. But when she uses Anti-Freezing on Cassandra, the latter turns into an N3 Nova.^{[vol 24]} She is unable to beat Nova Cassandra, who then converts Jessica into a Nova.^{[vol 25]}
Isabella Lucas (イザベラ=ルーカス, Izabera Rūkasu)
Formerly a nurse before being recruited to be a Pandora, Isabel was sentenced for a 500-year term after being convicted of killing thirteen newborns.^{[ch 149]} She has long blonde hair and a tanned complexion.^{[vol 25 cover]} Her Volt weapon is a cannon that she holds under her arm;^{[ch 153]} she wields a second cannon, and can combine it to form a directed beam cutting attack.^{[vol 23]} After Jessica defeats Ticy, Isabella then attempts to rape Abel, Ticy's Limiter.^{[vol 24]} She finds Satellizer and the other Pandoras to be weak, slicing their limbs, but is surprised by Cassandra's ability.^{[vol 24]} When Cassandra becomes an N3 Nova, she realizes that she is outmatched, and flees when Cassandra summons five more N3 Novas and transforms her fellow Buster Jessica into one.^{[vol 25]} Isabella later returns as part of the army sent by the European and Asian branches of Chevalier to bring down West Genetics once and for all.
Isuzu Sawatari (沢渡 五十鈴, Sawatari Isuzu)
The only member of Busters that was not incarcerated, Sawatari was discharged from the Chevalier after some incidents in which she killed two Pandoras, but in self-defense when the Pandoras attacked her for seducing their Limiters, and then end up killing themselves with their own weapons or stigmata going out of control. She also "killed" two civilian women in the same manner.^{[ch 149]} She has long pink hair.^{[vol 23 cover]} When she was in the 25th generation of West Genetics, she had eight stigmata, and was at the top of her class except for Suna Lee. She seduces and sleeps with Lee's Limiter, but Lee does not fall for her trap. When Lee responds with a smile indicating that she has the upper hand, Sawatari is traumatized to the point where she can no longer enjoy sex with men, so she makes it her life's mission to seek revenge on her.^{[ch 153]}
When the Busters invade West Genetics, she initially lets herself be defeated by Petty, who becomes the leader of the group. However, during the subsequent battles, she proves to be the strongest of the four Busters, breaking Satellizer and Arnett's Volt Weapons with her bare hands, easily slaughtering any Chevalier Pandora that got in her way, all with a smile on her face.^{[vol 23]} When the Legendary Pandoras turn into Novas, she flees, but when Petty confronts her about it, they have another fight where she easily defeats and then slices her head in two.^{[vol 24]} She reaches Gengo, who is guarded by Lee, and agrees to duel Lee first before attacking Gengo. Although she gets the upper hand in beating Lee down, she was stalled by Amelia Evans then was defeated by Lee and is captured.^{[vol 25]}^{[vol 26]}

== Other characters ==
Nova (異次元体ノヴァ, Ijigentei Nova; lit. 'Different Dimension Form Nova')
The Nova are the primary antagonists in the series, introduced as giant aliens from another dimension that resemble armored humans. They come in different types such as Type-R and Type-S. Early in the series, it is mentioned that only one of them has appeared at a time; each encounter has been logged as a Nova Clash. They are able to cast Freezing fields, which are only able to be countered by the Pandoras and their Limiters.^{[vol 1]} In the eighth Nova Clash, Kazuha Aoi sacrifices herself to fight off the Nova.^{[vol 1]} In the tenth Nova Clash, multiple Type-S Novas appear and attack East Genetics, where they are able to capture Pandoras, ^{[S1 ep 9]} and turn them into Nova Forms under their control.^{[vol 6]}^{[S1 ep 10]} Their goal in the Clash is to reach the body of Maria Lancelot, the first Pandora.^{[vol 5]}^{[vol 6]} In the E-Pandora story, Amelia Evans loses control and transforms into an "unknown-type" Nova.^{[vol 13]} In the Valkyrie story, it is revealed that the Nova attempted to communicate with Gengo Aoi.^{[vol 17]} During the twelfth Nova Clash, it is revealed that the Chevalier uses classifications for the humanoid-sized Nova such as N1 for the original ones, and afterwards, classify the saurian Novas as N2, and the human commanders as Pandora Class, or N3.^{[vol 21]}
Noel Alon-Grache (ノエル=アロングラッチュ, Noeru Arongruatchu)
Voiced by: Yuri Amano (Japanese); Linda Leonard (English)^{[S1 ep 7]}
Satellizer's late biological mother and Howard's mistress. She and Satellizer were taken in by the El Bridgets when Satellizer was nine years old and Noel still had a terminal medical condition.^{[S1 ep 7]}
Olivia el Bridget (オリビア=エル=ブリジット, Oribia eru Burijitto)
Voiced by: Miki Itō (Japanese); Nancy Sherrard (English)^{[S1 ep 7]}
The matriarch of the El Bridget family, Satellizer's stepmother, and Louis and Violet's biological mother. Initially, she despised Satellizer and her mother when she discovered the truth of her husband's affair. But Olivia later on regretted her actions towards them. After the incident at Bali she calls Satellizer and tells her that she has come to consider Satellizer as her daughter and genuinely wants to make amends with her.
Violet el Bridget (バイオレット=エル=ブリジット, Baioretto Eru Burijitto)
Voiced by: Ai Kayano (Japanese); Lindsay Seidel (English)^{[S1 ep 7]}
Satellizer's older half-sister and the eldest sibling of the el Bridget family. Unlike the rest of her family, Violet treated Satellizer and her mother with respect and cared about her younger half-sister. She was unaware of Satellizer's abuse from Louis until later on, and moved her away once she found out the truth.^{[S1 ep 7]}^{[ch 20]} She manages some of the El Bridget hotel resorts, including one in Bali.^{[vol 7]}
Howard el Bridget (ハワード=エル・ブリジット, Hawādo eru Burijitto)
Voiced by: Ryūzaburō Ōtomo (Japanese); John Swasey (English)
The patriarch of the el Bridget family and President and CEO of the El Corporation (エル・コーポレーション, Eru Kōporēshon). He became the head of the el Bridget family when he was only 18, and he was already dating his future wife Olivia at that time. He has worked with Gengo since the time both the Pandora and Valkyrie Projects where first suggested.
Atsuko Seiga (菅 敦子, Seiga Atsuko)
Executive Director of Seiga Heavy Industries, a private company that is known for creating artificial training Nova, as well as the Injection Stigmata for the newly developed Valkyries.^{[vol 16]} After the twelfth Nova Clash, she is forced to work under Gengo Aoi to help him accomplish his plan to create an organization independent from Chevalier, as she knows she lacks the power to oppose him. She then recruits Ohara to help her on the Legendary Stigmata plan.^{[vol 21]}
Ryuuichi Aoi (竜一葵, Aoi Ryuuichi)
Kazuya and Kazuha's father, the husband of Orie Aoi and the only son of Gengo and Maria Lancelot, who died years before the story began. A kind, caring and cheerful man, who valued his family's future before that of mankind's, in stark contrast to his father, who had always made sacrifices in the name of protecting mankind. As the first human born with a stigmatic body, he was chosen by his father to lead mankind against the "Transient Will" that intents to wipe out all humanity, but after the death of his wife he refused to accept the mission given to him by Gengo and committed suicide instead.
Orie Aoi (オリエ 葵, Aoi Orie)
Kazuha and Kazuya's mother, the wife of Ryuuichi Aoi and the aunt of Ouka Tenjouin, who died years before the story began. An insecure and unstable woman who greatly resented Cassandra and her closeness with her children, specially Kazuya, which led her to have a fight with her husband, in which she refused to acknowledge Kazuya as her son, to the point of attempting to killing him, forcing Kazuha to kill her own mother in order to protect her baby brother.
Arcadia Aoi (アルカディア葵, Arukadia Aoi)
A Pandora and the only member of the Arcadia Project. She's the daughter of Ryuuichi and Cassandra, making her Kazuya's younger half-sister. Kept cryogenically frozen since her birth, she was awakened by the battle between Kazuya and her aunts. She faced her aunts Teslad and Windy May and defeated them by draining their powers, ending the 13th Nova Clash. Arcadia wields a pair of massive gauntlets that have a resemblance to Chiffon Fairchild's machined looking version of Anti-Nova. After absorbing their power, her body develop into that of a buxom woman, very similar to her mother Cassandra.

== Works cited ==
=== Manga ===
==== Freezing ====
- Lim, Dall-Young and Kim, Kwang-Hyun フリージング. (in Japanese) 24 vols. Valkyrie Comics, 2007-present.
- Lim, Dall-Young and Kim, Kwang-Hyun Freezing. 12 omnibus vols. Seven Seas, 2015-.

- Vol. 1 (ch. 1-5): フリージング 1 (in Japanese). October ISBN 978-4-86032-474-2. and Freezing Omnibus 1. 2015.
- Vol. 2 (ch. 6-11): フリージング 2 (in Japanese). April 2008. ISBN 978-4-86032-570-1. and Freezing Omnibus 1. 2015.
- Vol. 3 (ch. 12-17): フリージング 3 (in Japanese). October 2008. ISBN 978-4-86032-650-0.
- Vol. 4 (ch. 18-24): フリージング 4 (in Japanese). April 2009. ISBN 978-4-86032-739-2.
- Vol. 5 (ch. 25-31): フリージング 5 (in Japanese). July 2009. ISBN 978-4-86032-787-3.
- Vol. 6 (ch. 32-38): フリージング 6 (in Japanese). October 2009. ISBN 978-4-86032-829-0.
- Vol. 7 (ch. 39-45): フリージング 7 (in Japanese). March 2010. ISBN 978-4-86032-898-6.
- Vol. 8 (ch. 46-52): フリージング 8 (in Japanese). August 2010. ISBN 978-4-86032-964-8
- Vol. 9 (ch. 53-59): フリージング 9 (in Japanese). October 2010. ISBN 978-4-86032-993-8.
- Vol. 10 (ch. 60-65): フリージング 10 (in Japanese). February 2011. ISBN 978-4-7992-0029-2.
- Vol. 11 (ch. 66-72): フリージング 11 (in Japanese). July 2011. ISBN 978-4-7992-0108-4.
- Vol. 12 (ch. 73-80): フリージング 12 (in Japanese). October 2011. ISBN 978-4-7992-0151-0.
- Vol. 13 (ch. 81-88): フリージング 13 (in Japanese). February 2012. ISBN 978-4-7992-0212-8.
- Vol. 14 (ch. 89-96): フリージング 14 (in Japanese). April 2012. ISBN 978-4-7992-0243-2.
- Vol. 15 (ch. 97-104): フリージング 15 (in Japanese). August 2012. ISBN 978-4-7992-0303-3.
- Vol. 16 (ch. 105-112): フリージング 16 (in Japanese). November 2012. ISBN 978-4-7992-0335-4.
- Vol. 17 (ch. 113-119): フリージング 17 (in Japanese). January 2013. ISBN 978-4-7992-0377-4.
- Vol. 18 (ch. 120-126): フリージング 18 (in Japanese). March 2013. ISBN 978-4799204023.
- Vol. 19 (ch. 127-133): フリージング 19 (in Japanese). May 2013. ISBN 978-4799204290.
- Vol. 20 (ch. 134-140): フリージング 20 (in Japanese). July 2013. ISBN 978-4799204542.
- Vol. 21 (ch. 141-147): フリージング 21 (in Japanese). October 2013. ISBN 978-4799204979.
- Vol. 22 (ch. 148-154): フリージング 22 (in Japanese). December 2013. ISBN 978-4799205211.
- Vol. 23 (ch. 155-161): フリージング 23 (in Japanese). March 2014. ISBN 978-4799205624.
- Vol. 24 (ch. 162-168): フリージング 24 (in Japanese). June 2014. ISBN 978-4799205990.
- Vol. 25 (ch. 169-??): フリージング 25 (in Japanese). October 2014. ISBN 978-4799206485.
- Vol. 26 (ch. ??-??): フリージング 26 (in Japanese). December 2014. ISBN 978-4799206751.

==== Freezing: First Chronicle ====
- Lim, Dall-Young and Yoon, Jae-Ho "フリージング ファーストクロニクル" (Freezing: First Chronicle) (in Japanese) February 2012. ISBN 978-4-7992-0211-1.

==== Freezing: Zero ====
- Lim, Dall-Young and Jeong, Soo-Cheol フリージングZERO. (in Japanese) 7 vols. Valkyrie Comics, 2012-present.

- Vol. 1 (ch. 1-5): フリージングZERO1 (in Japanese). August 2012. ISBN 978-4-7992-0304-0.
- Vol. 2 (ch. 6-10): フリージングZERO2 (in Japanese). February 2013. ISBN 978-4-7992-0390-3.
- Vol. 3 (ch. 11-14): フリージングZERO3 (in Japanese). June 2013. ISBN 978-4799204429.
- Vol. 4 (ch. 15-18): フリージングZERO4 (in Japanese). November 2013. ISBN 978-4799205099.
- Vol. 5 (ch. 19-22): フリージングZERO5 (in Japanese). March 2014. ISBN 978-4799205631.
- Vol. 6 (ch. 23-??): フリージングZERO6 (in Japanese). July 2014. ISBN 978-4799206126.
- Vol. 7 (ch. ??-??): フリージングZERO7 (in Japanese). December 2014. ISBN 978-4799206768.

==== Freezing: Pair Love Stories ====
- Lim, Dall-Young and Kim, So-Hee "フリージング ペアラブストーリーズ" (Freezing: Pair Love Stories) (in Japanese) 3 vols. Valkyrie Comics, 2013–14

- Vol. 1 (ch. 1-4): フリージング ペアラブストーリーズ 1 (in Japanese) September 2013. ISBN 978-4799204559.
- Vol. 2 (ch. 5-8): フリージング ペアラブストーリーズ 2 (in Japanese) November 2013. ISBN 978-4799205105.
- Vol. 3 (ch. 9-12): フリージング ペアラブストーリーズ 3 (in Japanese) March 2014. ISBN 978-4799205655.

=== Freezing anime ===
==== Season 1 ====
- EP 1: "Untouchable Queen".
- EP 2: "Pandora Mode".
- EP 3: "Accelerating Turn".
- EP 4: "Tempest Turn".
- EP 5: "She is Rana Linchen".
- EP 6: "Machination".
- EP 7: "Sanction".
- EP 8: "Pandora Queen".
- EP 9: "Godspeed of the East".
- EP 10: "NOVA Form".
- EP 11: "Ambush! Ravensborne Nucleochede".
- EP 12: "Satellizer Vs. Pandora".

==== Season 2: Freezing Vibration ====
- EP 1: "Pandora Returns".
- EP 2: "Evolution Pandora".
- EP 3: "Mark IV".
- EP 4: "Mate".
- EP 5: "Noblesse Oblige".
- EP 6: "Marionettes".
- EP 7: "Spellbound".
- EP 8: "Rebellion".
- EP 9: "Traitor".
- EP 10: "True Pandora".
- EP 11: "Nova Crash".
- EP 12: "Shaft of Light".
