= List of Freezing episodes =

Cover of the first DVD/Blu-ray volume of Freezing as released by Media Factory on March 30, 2011.

Freezing is an anime series adapted from the manga of the same title written by Dall-Young Lim and illustrated by Kwang-Hyun Kim. Set in a slightly futuristic world, Earth has been invaded and is at war with aliens from another dimension called the Nova. In order to counter them, genetically modified girls with super fighting skills called Pandoras and their male partners called Limiters who use special "freezing" powers to limit their opponent's mobility are made to fight against the Nova. The series focuses on Kazuya Aoi, a Limiter whose late sister was a Pandora, and Satellizer el Bridget, a powerful Pandora with a cold personality. Both are enrolled at the West Genetics Academy in which Pandoras and Limiters are trained. The plot follows Kazuya's friendship with Satellizer, the students of the Academy, and Earth's ongoing war against the Nova.

The anime was produced by A.C.G.T. and is directed by Takashi Watanabe, written by Masanao Akahoshi and Takao Yoshioka, and features music by Masaru Yokoyama, direction by Shinsaku Tanaka and Takashi Tachizaki, character design by Mayumi Watanabe, and art and sound direction by Satoru Kuwabara and Koji Tsujitani, respectively. The anime's first season aired on AT-X between January 8, 2011, and April 7, 2011, with subsequent runs on Chiba TV, Sun TV, Tokyo MX, TV Aichi, TV Kanagawa and TV Saitama. The show aired uncensored in 4:3 format on AT-X, while the airing on Tokyo MX (which began on January 9) and other channels were in 16:9 widescreen format and heavily censored. Six DVD and Blu-ray volumes were released by Media Factory between March 23 and August 24, 2011, each volume containing two episodes and original video animation called It'll Explode! Heart-Pounding Trouble♥Freezing (はじけちゃう!ドキドキトラブル♥フリージング, Hajikechau! Dokidoki Toraburu♥Furījingu), as well as other bonus material. The anime was licensed in North America by Funimation Entertainment for simulcasting (in its 16:9 edited format) on their video portal. Funimation later gained additional licensing rights to the series and released it in 2012 on DVD and Blu-ray. A second season titled "Freezing Vibration", began airing on AT-X on October 4, 2013. From December 25, 2013, to May 28, 2014, Freezing Vibration will be released in DVD and Blu-ray with OVA specials and CD dramas included.

The opening theme for the first season is "Color" by MARiA, a cover of a song by Hatsune Miku, and the ending theme is Kimi wo Mamoritai (君を守りたい, "To Protect You") by Aika Kobayashi. A CD single containing the two songs was released by Media Factory on February 23, 2011. The opening theme for the second season is "AVENGE WORLD" and the ending theme is Sekai wa Kizu o Dakishimeru (世界は疵（きず）を抱きしめる, "Embracing the World's Wounds (Wound)"); both are sung by Konomi Suzuki.

== Episode list ==
=== Season 1 (Freezing) ===
No. overall	No. in season	Title	Original air date
1	1	"Untouchable Queen" (Japanese: アンタッチャブルの女王)	January 8, 2011
In a battle royale to determine the rankings of second-year Pandoras, Satellizer el Bridget, also known as The Untouchable Queen, is the strongest-ranked Pandora. During class, teacher Yumi Kim talks about her experiences as a Pandora during the last war against the Nova, in which one battle against a powerful Nova was ultimately won thanks to the sacrifice of her squadmate, Kazuha Aoi. Meanwhile, Kazuha's brother, Kazuya, is transported to West Genetics Academy by student president Chiffon Fairchild, and is given a rundown about the nature of Pandoras and Limiters. Kazuya arrives while Satellizer is in a battle against the second-ranked Pandora, Ganessa Roland, but Kazuya mistakes her for his late sister and hugs her, provoking an embarrassing reaction from her and leaves her open to attack.
2	2	"Pandora Mode" (Japanese: パンドラモード)	January 15, 2011
Because of Kazuya's interference, Satellizer lost the battle against Ganessa, whom is now the number-one-ranked second-year Pandora. Kazuya wants to apologize to Satellizer, but Chiffon advises him against it due to Satellizer's fear of being touched and her lashing out on anyone who does. Soon, Satellizer arrives, and Kazuya tries to apologize. Despite Kazuya holding her arm, Satellizer does nothing but tell him to leave her alone. Just then, a gloating Ganessa arrives and insults her, which starts a fight between the two despite Chiffon's warnings. When Satellizer manages to knock her down, Ganessa goes into Pandora Mode proceeding to beat and torture Satellizer. Kazuya tries to stop the fight, but Ganessa slaps him away causing Satellizer to go into Pandora Mode as well, and defeats Ganessa. Kim and Medical Officer Elise Schmitz stop the fight, and they punish both girls by putting them in the brig. After getting to know the headmistress, Sister Margaret, and his dorm neighbor, Arthur Clipton (Ganessa's Limiter), Kazuya still wants to apologize properly to Satellizer. Meanwhile, a Pandora named Miyabi Kannazuki takes an interest with Kazuya and wants to make him her newest Limiter.
3	3	"Accelerating Turn"; Transliteration: "Dengen wo Irete Kasoku" (Japanese: 電源を入れて加速)	January 22, 2011
After introducing himself to his class and having lunch with class representative Kaho Hiiragi, Kazuya sees Satellizer and decides to apologize to her properly. He finds her on the rooftop, and through their conversations, he is glad to find that she is a shy and nice person. Both Arthur and Kaho are shocked to find that Kazuya can talk to her normally. However, third-year Pandora Miyabi and her three Limiters arrive. Miyabi offers Kazuya to be her limiter but when he rejects, she threatens Kazuya, which prompts Satellizer to raise her weapon against Miyabi. After taking a strike to her face, which angers her, Miyabi orders her Limiters to freeze both Kazuya and Satellizer and beat them. As Miyabi and her Limiters humiliate and sexually harass Satellizer, Kazuya activates his Freezing powers to stop them. By the time Kim, Elise and Chiffon arrive to stop the fight, Satellizer has brutally beaten Miyabi and her Limiters and is about to deliver a deadly blow when Kazuya pleads with her to stop, which she does. As Kim and Elise learn the secrets of Kazuya's abilities, Chiffon warns him again to stay away from Satellizer because she is now the target of the other third-years, who do not take lightly to those who disrespect the Academy's hierarchy.
4	4	"Tempest Turn" (Japanese: テンペストターン)	January 29, 2011
After spending a week in solitary confinement for her actions, Satellizer faces Ingrid Bernstein, a third-year who challenges her to a duel to punish her for going against the third-years and tells her to find a Limiter. Upon hearing about it, Kazuya asks Satellizer to let him be her partner, but she again refuses. Afterwards, Satellizer attacks Ingrid before their match, but Ingrid is well-prepared and gets the upper hand. When her Limiter, Leo, arrives, Ingrid gives Satellizer one more chance find a Limiter, for which Kazuya volunteers despite being warned of the consequences by Ingrid. Thanks to his powerful Freezing ability, Satellizer is able to knock down both Leo and Ingrid, but, hellbent on punishing Satellizer, Ingrid refuses to give up and goes into Pandora Mode, leaving Kazuya confused as to why Ingrid takes hierarchy discipline so seriously. Ganessa reveals to Kazuya that a year ago during an outdoor training session, Ingrid's best friend Marin died when she fought a Nova alone, and she believes Marin would have survived had the younger students not run away due to a lack of discipline in their ranks. Hearing this, Kazuya freezes Ingrid and tells her that he understands her pain just like he had when he lost his sister. He tells her actions are tainting her late friend's memories, that Marin did not die in vain as she was actually sacrificing her life to protect the younger students. With Ganessa confirming it as well, Ingrid realizes this is not what Marin wanted, and breaks down in tears.
5	5	"She is Rana Linchen" (Japanese: 彼女はラナLinchenです)	February 5, 2011
Satellizer finally accepts Kazuya as her Limiter, as she does not feel uncomfortable when he touches her and he can do Freezing without performing a baptism. Arthur and Kaho are shocked by this development and even more so when they learn Satellizer has invited Kazuya into her room tonight. Meanwhile, a new student named Rana Linchen arrives at West Genetics. As Kazuya, Arthur and Kaho head to the girls' dormitory they are confronted by second-year Pandoras Audrey Duval, Tris Mckenzie and Aika Takeuchi, whom all lost to Satellizer at the battle royale and want to take it out on Kazuya torturing Arthur and Kaho for interfering in the process. In anger, Kazuya activates his Freezing powers but soon loses consciousness as Rana arrives to rescue them and defeats the second-year Pandoras. Informed on what just happened, Satellizer visits the hospitalized Kazuya. As she has a chat with Arthur and a hospitalized Kaho, Rana believes Kazuya is her chosen one (a Limiter) but Arthur and Kaho advise her not to as Kazuya is Satellizer's Limiter.
6	6	"Machination"; Transliteration: "Inbou" (Japanese: 陰謀)	February 12, 2011
Rana enrolls into Satellizer's class, and defeats Ganessa during a practice bout. Despite being warned, Rana makes her move on Kazuya, hoping to make him her partner much to Satellizer's jealousy. Arthur and Kaho continue to warn Kazuya not to be with Satellizer after telling him how she was expelled from East Genetics for injuring a potential Limiter. Later, Attia tells Rana that Satellizer has not performed a baptism with Kazuya, and that she is only using him for his Freezing powers, which Rana brings Satellizer to a training facility where she challenges her over who should be Kazuya's partner. After a brutal fight, Kazuya intervenes to clarify to Rana about his relationship with Satellizer but Attia, along with two other third-year Pandoras, Arnett McMillan and Creo Brand, arrive.
7	7	"Sanction"; Transliteration: "Seisai" (Japanese: 制裁)	February 19, 2011
After Kazuya is knocked unconscious, Satellizer starts fighting against Arnett while Rana, who seeks revenge for being used, goes against Cleo. Arnett manages to use her Double Accel technique to take advantage of Satellizer, allowing her to slit her neck while Rana is similarly overwhelmed by Cleo's Tempest Turn. As she tries to remain conscious while the third-years argue on what to do with her, Satellizer recalls when she and her mother were brought into the El Bridget household. Because her mother was her father's mistress, Satellizer was treated harshly by her younger half-brother, Luis, who even sexually abused her, and she was forced to bear it for her mother's sake until her older half-sister Violet learned about it and put a stop to it. On her deathbed, Satellizer's mother apologizes to Satellizer for what she had gone through and encourages her to never lose to anyone. Remembering those words, Satellizer stands up and defeats Arnett with a Triple Accel technique while Rana uses Cleo's Tempest Turn together with her fighting style to defeat Cleo. However, all four girls refuse to give up but the fight is stopped when Chiffon and Ticy arrive ordering the third-years to stand down after Chiffon quickly subdues Arnett. As Satellizer and Rana bring Kazuya to the hospital, Chiffon meets with Elizabeth Mably at the swimming pool and tells her to stop targeting Satellizer as it is useless and their peaceful days are about to be over soon.
8	8	"Pandora Queen"; Transliteration: "Pandora no Jou" (Japanese: パンドラの女王)	February 26, 2011
The West Genetics Academy decides to hold a prom where Satellizer and Rana cross eyes over who will be Kazuya's dancing partner; he chooses the former. Meanwhile, Elizabeth decides to take Chiffon's advice and tells the third-years to stop targeting Satellizer but Attia still wants to humiliate her. On the night of the prom, Attia challenges Satellizer to compete in the Pandora Queen beauty contest which the latter agrees out of pride. When she's about to go on stage, Satellizer becomes nervous but Rana, who is also competing, encourages her to withstand it for the sake of her partner. Despite being shy on stage, her timidness appeases the crowd and she wins the crown. Angry about her loss, Attia arranges for Satellizer to wear a skimpy outfit which becomes transparent under the spotlight, but Kazuya Freezes the crowd so they can escape.
9	9	"Godspeed of the East" (Japanese: 東のゴッドスピード)	March 5, 2011
Kazuya is invited to East Genetics Academy to meet the #1 ranked third-year Pandora, Cathy Lockharte, who possesses Stigmata from his late sister, Kazuha. Despite her potential, she explains she plans to become a novelist, staying around to graduate. As Kazuya returns home, Sister Margaret reveals that Satellizer also possesses six of Kazuha's Stigmata, but showed little compatibility with them. Cathy reveals to her teacher Milena that the reason she doesn't want to join the Chevalier, the Pandora elite, was because she was there when Satellizer attacked the playboy Limiter when she was still a student at East Genetics, and Satellizer's resolve to never give up no matter how many times Cathy put her down made her scared and realize how weak she was. Just then, East Genetics is attacked by a four Type-S Nova who exhibit abilities that have never been seen before. The Nova overwhelm the students, but then absorb some of the Pandoras, including Cathy and Milena. Meanwhile, Satellizer overhears Kazuya talking with Arthur and Kaho, believing that Kazuya only chose her because she reminded him of his sister.
10	10	"NOVA Form" (Japanese: NOVAフォーム)	March 12, 2011
West Genetics Academy is soon attacked and surrounded by the Nova. With the fourth-years deployed to East Genetics and too far away to help them, Kim and Elise lead the remaining fourth-years to the front lines while the rest of West Genetics' Pandoras and Limiters are ordered to guard the Academy. However, the Nova soon release a bunch of Nova Forms, Pandoras they absorbed earlier at East Genetics who are now under their control. Meanwhile, Satellizer is angry that Kazuya sees her only as a replacement for his sister and is about to engage in a fight with Rana when they are called by Sister Margaret to defend the underground Ravensborne Nucleochede facility, which holds the body of Maria Lancelot, the first and the mother of Pandoras. A small group of Nova Forms led by Cathy and Milena breach the underground facility.
11	11	"Ambush! Ravensborne Nucleochede" (Japanese: AMBUSH! Ravensbourneのヌクレオチド)	March 26, 2011 (Note: Episode was delayed due to the 2011 Tōhoku earthquake and tsunami)
As the Nova Forms head towards the Ravensborne Nucleochede, Ingrid, Attia, Creo and Arnett attempt to stop them. Cathy and Milena manage to evade them only to encounter Elizabeth and her Limiter, whom the latter learns the Nova Forms weak point is the Nova Stigma between their collarbones which will destroy the infection and release them from Nova control. However, Cathy breaks into the lower levels where Satellizer and the others are. After defeating Rana and Ganessa, Cassie goes after Satellizer who refuses Kazuya's help, where they both get into a fierce battle using all of their Tempest Turn and Accel techniques. As Cathy prepares a finishing blow to Satellizer, Kazuya summons up all of his Freezing abilities to stop Cathy and tells Satellizer how important she is to him which the latter realize how much Kazuya cares about being her partner. Cathy breaks free of Kazuya's Freezing and temporarily in her normal self, begs Satellizer to stop her before her Nova Stigma takes control again. Meanwhile, Milena defeats Elizabeth and finally arrives at the facility where Maria's body is being held.
12	12	"Satellizer VS. Pandora" (Japanese: サテライザーVS.パンドラ)	April 7, 2011
Milena is stopped by Chiffon and Ticy from approaching Maria's body. Meanwhile, Cathy shoots an energy beam at Satellizer but Ganessa sacrifices her life to shield her. Traumatized from Ganessa's death who considers Satellizer her comrade, Satellizer goes berserk and turns into Nova Form where she brutally beats Cathy, cutting both her arms and ripping off her infected Stigma. Free from Nova control, Cathy begs Satellizer to kill her but she is stopped by Kazuya who manages to hold her back and calm her, which turns her back to normal. With Ganessa revealed to have survived and Milena defeated, the Pandoras believe it is over, but the last remaining Nova uses Milena's Stigma as a beacon to teleport into the Ravensborne Nucleotide, forcing Satellizer, Rana, Ingrid, Cleo, Arnett, Attia, Elizabeth, Chiffon and Ticy to fight it. However, the Nova uses Cathy's infected Stigma to infect Satellizer into a Nova Form and uses her to cast a powerful Freezing ability to stop the Pandoras as it goes after Maria's body. Hearing her cries for help, Kazuya activates his Freezing on Satellizer and thanks to Kazuha's spirit, she breaks free of the Nova's control and stops its Freezing which finally allows the Pandoras to finish off the Nova. After recovering and returning to East Genetics, Cathy, influenced by both Kazuya and Satellizer's ideals, tells Milena that she decided to join the Chevalier and still be a novelist. With her change of personality, the other Pandoras comment how much Satellizer has changed thanks to Kazuya. In the epilogue, Sister Margaret has a talk with a "Professor Aoi" over the Stigmata as a double-edged sword, but he warns the fight with the Nova is far from over.

=== Season 2 (Freezing Vibration) ===
No. overall	No. in season	Title	Original air date
13	1	"Pandora Returns"	October 4, 2013
Satellizer, Kazuya and Rana are en route to a Chevalier base in Alaska when they are called for help to defend an oil field from a Type S Nova. As the three of them fight the Nova, their battle is watched by a female scientist. Together with Chiffon, Elizabeth and their Limiters, they destroy the Nova which they discover is a robot Dummy Nova, realizing the whole thing was set up to test their skills. Since the incident at West Genetics, the Nova are coming into their dimension at a shorter time. In response, the Chevalier have approved the E-Pandora Project by Scarlett Ohara, which aims to make young woman who aren't genetically compatible with Stigmata into Pandoras despite oppositions by others including Professor Gengo Aoi, Kazuya's grandfather. At the Alaskan base where the world's top Pandoras have gathered, Chiffon introduces the others to Roxanne Elipton, Charles Bonaparte and Julia Munberk, the top Pandoras of Genetics America, France and Germany respectively. Together with Cassie and Chiffon, the five of them are the top five Pandoras of their generation. After trying their new uniforms, Scarlett explains she gathered the top Pandoras in collecting data to help the E-Pandora Project. When Roxanne comments Scarlett may have performed human experiments before the E-Pandora Project was approved, she is angrily confronted by a trio of E-Pandoras.
14	2	"Evolution Pandora"	October 11, 2013
Rana is to displeased when she discovers Satellizer and Kazuya will be sharing a room. Later, a mock battle between the Pandoras and E-Pandoras is held to test their strengths. In the first two rounds, E-Pandoras Gina Papleton and Rattle are defeated. Amelia Evans, the strongest E-Pandora, battles Elizabeth in the third round. Despite being badly beaten by Elizabeth, Amelia refuses to give up even when it becomes clear her body cannot take it. It is only after when her friends and Scarlett persuades her that she gives up the fight. The E-Pandoras feel down with their defeat but Amelia cheers up her comrades by telling them they will defeat the Pandoras, who they consider uppity elites due to coming from rich families, while they themselves came from even worse backgrounds. The next day at lunch, Amelia, Jina and Rattle are surprised to find Elizabeth having lunch with them. Elizabeth assures the E-Pandoras they only lost because the regular Pandoras had longer training and experience than them so she and others Pandoras will help them to be strong as the Pandoras, cheering the E-Pandoras. Meanwhile, Secretary Spencer orders Scarlett to administered "Mark IV" despite her opposition.
15	3	"Mark IV"	October 18, 2013
Scarlett reveals the Mark IV proposition to the E-Pandoras and original Pandoras explaining it to be a nanomachine infusion containing original Pandora data to enhance the E-Pandora's compatibility with their Stigmata. Afterwards, the original Pandoras discuss the timing of Mark IV and its viability. While Satellizer and Rana train competitively, Amelia meets with Scarlett to discuss her concerns about the Mark IV wherein Scarlett reveals that due to the E-Pandoras willing agreement to join the project, they have no say in the matter but somewhat manages to allay Amelia's concerns. Back in training, Satellizer manages to defuse a confrontation between Rana and Jina over Rattle's eating habits. Amelia confronts Jina about volunteering for the Mark IV but Jina rebukes her stating its only fairly her turn. Later, Jina thanks Satellizer revealing that it's Satellizer's data she'll be using and that'll allow her to defeat Satellizer for their practice match. During the administration, a problem arises before a flash forward to the match wherein Jina appears to be holding her own as shown in a promotional video to the public. Spencer is briefed in Jina's increasing unusual Stigmata activity, but he considers it to be expected and necessary to the point of her being a living corpse for the public's support. At the administration lab, a helpless Jina is shown to be becoming a Nova and consciously aware of it. Desiring to see Amelia and Rattle again, Jina breaks free of the lab while Spencer orders the mobilization of selected Pandora to stop her.
16	4	"Mate"	October 25, 2013
Satellizer departs as she remembers the match with Jina while Jina in Nova Form engages Elizabeth. Barely conscious, Jina reveals to Amelia that the Mark IV is a sham as Charles starts to engage Jina as well, ultimately killing her. Later, the other E-Pandoras hold a memorial service for Jina by burning her mementos. Scarlett interrupts the service ordering the others to stop the fire as she reveals the Mark IV experiments will continue whether the E-Pandoras choose to or not. Elizabeth, overseeing the service visits Satellizer after being turned away by Dr. Ohara while investigating and warns her to stay away. Outside the facility, Elizabeth consoles Amelia. Pursuing the matter, Elizabeth attempts to enlist the aid of Chiffon but is denied while being overheard by Satellizer. Curious about Elizabeth's methods while attempting to forcible assist and intervene, Satellizer is shot in the joints by Elizabeth who continues on her own.
17	5	"Noblesse Oblige"	November 1, 2013
As Kazuya accompanies Satellizer, who is a wheelchair user, to West Genetics for treatment, she has a change of plans and heads to Bali instead. Meanwhile, Elizabeth, as her noblesse oblige duty, sends information about the E-Pandora project to her family, hoping their influence will lead to an investigation into Chevalier's shady activities and save the E-Pandoras. However, Spencer and the Chevaliers discover the leak and have Elizabeth tortured with electroshock as punishment. Three days later, Chiffon, Yujin, Andre and Rana are worried over Elizabeth, but much to their shock, the Chevaliers return a catatonic Elizabeth to them. At the same time, the Mably Conglomerate are hit with a series of scandals which ruins the company's reputation. Andre and Chiffon realize this was the work of the Chevaliers in retaliation of Elizabeth's leak as she discovered the Mark IV experiment is incomplete and the Chevaliers were trying to cover up the truth to the public. Amelia is saddened by what has happened to Elizabeth. Elsewhere, Satellizer reveals to Kazuya she came to Bali to ask her family for help to stop the E-Pandora project. Arriving at a resort owned by the el Bridget family, Satellizer is reunited with her older sister Violet. But to her horror, her younger brother Louis is here as well.
18	6	"Marionettes"	November 8, 2013
Traumatized in seeing Louis, Satellizer shuts herself in her room much to Kazuya's confusion. Later that night, Louis visits Satellizer, revealing the Chevaliers framed the Mably family and their family had suspicious on the E-Pandora project hence why he and his Pandora Holly Rose didn't come. Louis tells Satellizer he can ask his parents help if she becomes his toy once more. Satellizer tries to resist but Louis hits her and makes her remember the humiliation and abuses he did, mentally breaking her. With her will broken and obedient, Louis is about to have his way with Satellizer until he is put off when his sister says she is his obedient servant. The next morning, Louis has a talk with Kazuya, telling him he should quit being Satellizer's Limiter as he is not worthy as he plans to have his sister quit being a Pandora. But to his anger, Kazuya rejects his threats and bribery as the relationship between him and Satellizer is none of Louis' business. After a talk with Violet, Kazuya heads to a temple where Satellizer is. Louis appears before them, revealing he tricked them to come here as he beats Kazuya and reveals what he did to Satellizer in the past and she is his slave. However, Kazuya is not intimidated, telling Louis that Satellizer is no longer the weak girl he knew but the strong Pandora he loves. Enraged, Louis orders Holly to cut Kazuya's arm.
19	7	"Spellbound"	November 15, 2013
Holly and Satellizer engage on a duel and Louis continues to berate Satellizer. However, Satellizer firms her resolve in protecting Kazuya as their bond is mutual and manages to gain upper hand on Holly. Holly, on the other hand, will do anything because of her love for Louis and being jealous of Satellizer. As Holly loses to Satellizer, Louis loses his mind, accepts that he cannot love Satellizer and jumps off the cliff. Holly follows Louis in attempt to save from drowning. After the fight, Rana manages to call Satellizer and tells them to come back as soon as possible. Satellizer and Kazuya leaves Bali as Louis says goodbye to them and starts to make up his feelings with Holly.
20	8	"Rebellion"	November 22, 2013
Furious that the Mark IV experiments are scheduled to resume, the E-Pandora girls plan to escape from the Alaskan base.
21	9	"Traitor"	November 29, 2013
The E-Pandora rebellion tears allegiances apart and pits Pandora comrades against each other in battle. Amelia continues to transform into a Nova.
22	10	"True Pandora"	December 6, 2013
The in-fighting among regular Pandora rages on as the E-Pandora rebellion continues. Skills and hidden talents are revealed as are new secrets.
23	11	"Nova Crash"	December 13, 2013
Seeing Scarlett Ohara and an array of Maria Lancelot clones, Amelia was shocked as Ohara justifies the deaths of her comrades Rattle and Gina and now fully transforms into an unknown type of Nova after her emotions lose control. The clones easily assimilate to Amelia's Nova and destroys the laboratory. Meanwhile, Aoi Gengo removes Spencer from commanding duties and orders all Pandoras and Limiters to mobilize against Amelia's Nova form which is heading to a photon generator. The Pandoras lose their morale as the Stigmata synchronization emits mental disruption, to which Satellizer recalls her saddest memories such as the death of her mother to which she intends to give in to the power of Amelia's Nova. With the help of Kazuya and Rana, Satellizer's mind become stable. As Amelia's Nova gets closer to the generator, Chiffon unleashes her Anti-Nova drive and finally opens her eyes.
24	12	"Shaft of Light"	December 20, 2013
Chiffon fights Amelia's Nova in attempt to protect the photon generator and her fellow comrades Satellizer, Rana, Kazuya and her Limiter Yujin. She lands some blows to Amelia but the Nova's armor quickly repairs and protect its core. Chiffon further transforms herself to increase her strength. Amelia's Nova delivers a powerful energy beam but Chiffon manages to nullify its attack. During the fight, Chiffon and Amelia converse each other within their subconscious and Chiffon decides to protect her comrades and suggests to stop the attack while Amelia agrees on Chiffon's suggestion but her emotions completely took over her and the attack is unavoidable. With the assimilation of Type Maria's power to Amelia's Nova, Amelia further transforms her Nova into a powerful self-destructing core and Chiffon decides to sacrifice herself in order to prevent annihilation. After Chiffon's successful absorption of Amelia's attack, her aura spreads throughout the Alaskan laboratory putting Pandoras to tears and realizing it came from Chiffon's love. Even Chiffon's aura reaches to Ticy, which she tells Ticy that she would be the successor of becoming President on their organization. In the aftermath of Amelia's Nova attack, Ohara was hospitalized and Spencer was taken to custody. Kazuya returns to Japan to be with Satellizer and Rana, but afterwards they see a new Ticy Phenyl with hair length same as Chiffon and the ribbon being tied to her right part of the hair walking somewhat grieving due to Chiffon's death.

== OVA episodes ==
=== Season 1 (Freezing) ===
No.	Title	Original release date
1	"I Want to Touch Her♥Satellizer, the Girl with Glasses"; Transliteration: "Sesshoshitai no♥Megane-musune Sateraizā" (Japanese: 接触したいの♥メガネっ娘サテライザー)	March 29, 2011
Satellizer and Kazuya battles Ganessa and Arthur but Satellizer gets a cold and sneezes which accidentally disables her Volt Texture which includes her clothes. Completely naked, Satellizer is soon groped by Rana who decides to get naked as well and disables her Volt Texture. Accusing them of seducing Arthur who is completely aroused from watching, Ganessa also disables her Volt Texture and gropes Rana. Kazuya, who has been injured this whole time, can't do anything but watch as all the girls get the cold.
2	"Lots of Secrets♥The First Room Invitation"; Transliteration: "Himitsu ga Ippai♥Hatsu Heya-iri" (Japanese: 秘密がいっぱい♥初部屋入り)	April 27, 2011
In the public baths, Arnett, Cleo, Attia and Ingrid ask Satellizer if she has already invited Kazuya to her room. When she reveals she hasn't as she does not know what to do next, the girls sneak Kazuya inside and decide "to teach" Satellizer. However, Elizabeth arrives and chastises the girls for trying to teach Satellizer since their first time of inviting their Limiters weren't perfect either. As they ask Elizabeth to teach them properly, Chiffon arrives and falls on the floor laughing over the girls' talk while an embarrassed Kazuya is ignored.
3	"Someone's Going to See♥Overly-extreme Physical"; Transliteration: "Mie Chau no♥Kageki Sugiru Shintai Sokutei" (Japanese: 見えちゃうの♥過激すぎる身体測定)	May 25, 2011
The girls are having their body measurement check-up, where Rana shows her ability to correctly guess the breast size of the girls by groping them as she demonstrates it on Kaho, Ganessa, Satellizer, Chiffon and Ticy. Attia, who has an inferiority complex due to her smaller breasts, refuses to join until Chiffon decides to do the "examination" on her. Unknown to the girls, the boys are secretly listening from outside.
4	"The Genetics Swim Meet♥There Are Nip Slips, Too"; Transliteration: "Zenetikkusu Suiei Taikai♥Porori mo aru yo" (Japanese: ゼネティックス水泳大会♥ポロリもあるよ)	June 22, 2011
Kazuya, Ingrid, Ganessa, Satellizer, Rana and Attia compete in a swimming competition. When Ganessa takes the advantage after Attia stops Rana from using her Pandora powers, Attia stops her by stripping her swimsuit, which leads to all of the girls to strip each other's swimsuits as well. Kazuya arrives at the finish line believing he had won, only to learn to his shock that a Nova actually won the race.
5	"Don't Look♥The Pandora's Bare Change of Clothes"; Transliteration: "Micha dame♥Pandora-tachi no Nama Kigae" (Japanese: 見ちゃだめ♥パンドラ達の生着替え)	July 27, 2011
Kim and Elise learns to their horror that there is a critical error within the Volt Texture system and it is spreading quickly. In order to stop it, Sister Margaret orders the system to be shut down. Unfortunately, her timing couldn't have been perfect as the Pandoras are having a group exercise performing cheerleading moves with the male Limiters watching. When Sister Margaret orders the shut down, the girls lose their Volt-Textured gym clothes much to their embarrassment and the boys' joy. Ironically, Kim, Elise, and Sister Margaret's clothes were made of Volt Texture as well, which makes everyone gawk at the middle-aged Margaret's supermodel-level body.
6	"Freezing Gone Wild♥Sighs-a-plenty for the Pandoras"; Transliteration: "Bōsō Furījingu♥O Ane-sama-tachi no Toiki ga Ichi-hai" (Japanese: 暴走フリージング♥お姉さまたちの吐息が一杯)	August 24, 2011
Kim has the Pandoras train trying to escape Kazuya's freezing field without using Pandora Mode. However, due to their Ereinbar Set synchronizing with Kazuya's, the girls (including Kim) are too aroused to do anything as the feeling is too pleasurable. In their confusion, the Pandoras strip Satellizer's clothes which causes Kazuya to faint, ending the training session. Later, Satellizer cries for being humiliated in front of Kazuya while the girls try to comfort her.

=== Season 2 (Freezing Vibration) ===
No.	Title	Original release date
1	"Satellizer L. Bridget"	December 25, 2013
Satellizer is used as a test subject by Amelia and the E-Pandora in a zero gravity chamber. The test involves some intense stimulation and groping in order to steal her powers. Eventually, an extremely aroused Satellizer releases so much energy that she overloads the machine and sends the girls flying. Kazuya arrives and gawks at the scene.
2	"Scarlett O'Hara"	January 29, 2014
Dr. O'Hara gives Charles a device to increase her breast size. When she struts around the pool, the other girls get jealous and ask how she did it, so she pulls out the device, which resembles a dildo. Dr. O'Hara arrives, finds several girls used it and are exhausted and aroused, and complains that they were supposed to follow the instructions. Satellizer complains that she didn't get to use it yet.
3	"Julia Munberk"	February 26, 2014
Julia presents her latest work of fiction for Satellizer and Rana to critique: A Cinderella-style love story with Cathy as Cinderella, Charles and Roxanne as the stepsisters, and her as the Fairy Godmother. In the story, the stepsisters sexually harass Cinderella before leaving for the ball. When the Fairy Godmother arrives, she erases Cinderella's clothes and gives her a bath while groping her. The story abruptly ends and a stunned Satellizer and Rana realize this is just Julia's lesbian fantasy.
4	"Holly Rose"	March 26, 2014
When Louis and Kazuya fall into icy water, it's up to Holly and Satellizer to warm up their partners: using their naked bodies. The girls compete with each other by rubbing against their partner at super speed. Unfortunately, they generate so much heat that the iceberg they are on breaks and sends them all tumbling into the water.
5	"Roxanne Elipton"	April 25, 2014
Surprised by their lack of progress in baptizing Kazuya, Roxanne teaches Satellizer and Rana how to seduce a Limiter. After the two practice sexy underwear and poses, Roxanne hurls Kazuya into the room and tells them to start, but they scream. Chiffon shows up and when she learns what they are doing, asks to join in, shocking everyone.
6	"March Through The Snow"	May 28, 2014
The Pandoras are ordered to march through a blizzard in their underwear to test their limits. Soon the cold makes them go crazy and strip naked. Chiffon laments their weakness.
