= Black God (manga) =

Japanese manga series and its adaptation(s)

- Cover of the first English volume as released by Yen Press

黒神 (Kuro Kami)
- Manga
- Written by: Lim Dall-young
- Illustrated by: Park Sung-woo
- Published by: Square Enix
- English publisher: NA / UK: Yen Press
- Magazine: Young Gangan
- Original run: March 2005 – August 2012
- Volumes: 19
- Anime television series

Kurokami: The Animation
- Directed by: Tsuneo Kobayashi
- Produced by: Jun Yukawa; Noboru Sugiyama; Hiroyuki Satō
- Written by: Reiko Yoshida
- Music by: Tomohisa Ishikawa
- Studio: Sunrise
- Licensed by: AUS: Madman Entertainment; NA: Discotek Media
- Original network: TV Asahi
- Original run: January 8, 2009 – June 18, 2009
- Episodes: 24
- icon

Black God (Japanese: 黒神, Hepburn: Kuro Kami) is a Japanese-Korean manga series written by Dall-Young Lim and illustrated by Park Sung-woo. Square Enix published the manga in Japan's bi-monthly seinen magazine Young Gangan. The story is initially set in modern-day Tokyo, then changes to the island of Okinawa in the middle of the story. The word Black in the title refers to the character Kuro (黒), as it means black in Japanese. God in the title refers to the fact that Kuro is a superhuman, or "Tera Guardian". In France and other French-speaking countries and territories, the manga goes under the name Kurokami: Black God.

The manga is created entirely by a South Korean manhwa team led by both Lim and Park. They would occasionally make fun of the fact that none of them were fluent in Japanese in omake segments drawn at the end of each manga volume.

Black God was among four manga titles licensed by Yen Press along with Zombie-Loan, Alice on Deadlines, and Spiral: The Bonds of Reasoning when it was announced by their panel at the 2007 New York Comic Convention. Nineteen volumes have been released in North America.

It has been adapted into an anime animated by Sunrise, and first aired in Japan and in the United States on January 8, 2009, while South Korea aired it on January 9, 2009.

== Development ==
When Black God was being created, written, and illustrated by Lim, Park, and their manhwa team, it was done entirely in Korean first before it would then be translated from Korean to Japanese, as it was meant to be published and serialized for the Japanese manga market and not for South Korea. The other works of Lim and Park had been done for the manhwa market in South Korea.

== Plot ==
Keita Ibuki is a 19-year-old independent and struggling freelance computer programmer. The two biggest things on his mind are the death years ago of his mother, a few days after she and he had seen her doppelganger; and his project, with two of his friends, to develop and sell a video game program to a big-time video game company in Tokyo. He tries to stay afloat, survive financially and finance his video game project with money given to him by his 21-year-old childhood friend Akane Sano (In the anime, Keita is an ordinary high school student).

One night, he has a chance meeting with a high Tera Guardian named Kuro while eating alone at a ramen stand. He gives her his dinner, a bowl of ramen, and tries to protect her when she is attacked in an ambush by an unknown Tera Guardian. Keita loses an arm during the second round of that fight but Kuro is able to save his life by exchanging his arm for hers since she has enhanced healing abilities like all Tera Guardians (In the anime, his heart is injured and their hearts are exchanged instead). This creates a contract between them, which can make her more powerful than before. In the manga, Keita and Akane strongly disbelieve what Kuro is telling them until Akane grabs Keita's left arm and yanks it around to show that it belongs to Keita, and it comes off. Kuro tells them that during this process he must stay close to her as the host body until the arm is completely fused, or it will rot and fall off; and that because of the swap her power is temporarily diminished by 50%. Once they are synchronized, she will have 200% as much power (In the anime, Kuro warns Keita that they need to be together at all times because her heart will become necrotic if it is away from the main body).

As Kuro stays with Keita and gets acquainted with him while meeting with other Tera Guardians and their human masters, they are targeted by the strongest Tera Guardian clan of the East, the Shishigam Clan in an attempt to kidnap Akane and bring about the destruction of the coexistence balance, which Tera Guardians are supposed to protect. Meanwhile, Keita is determined to find out why his mother died after seeing her double as a young boy and to find out who is responsible for trying to destroy the coexistence balance on Earth.

== Characters ==
Main protagonists of Black God. From left to right: Akane Sano, Kuro (with Punipuni) and Keita Ibuki.

=== Main characters ===
Keita Ibuki (伊吹 慶太, Ibuki Keita)
Voiced by: Daisuke Namikawa (Japanese); Jason Griffith (English)
The main character. As a child, Keita and his mother met a person who looked exactly like her. The next day, she died. Years later, he is a struggling video game programmer. One day, at a ramen house, he met Kuro, offered her food and their story began there. Keita does not appear to be aware of Akane's feelings for him, although in the anime, he accepts Akane's feelings and marries her in the final episode.
In the anime, Keita is portrayed as an ordinary high school student. Unlike his manga counterpart, he is neither extremely arrogant nor openly antagonistic of Kuro. He does not physically assault her either to express his displeasure, and unlike his manga counterpart, Kuro trades their hearts instead of their arms, when forming a contract. He is a Sub (substitute) in the anime, while in the manga he is initially a typical human with two doppeliners out there, none of whom he had met. After having two crests on his hands, he escaped the fate of dying after meeting his root in the manga.
In the final episode, Keita is shown to have grandchildren and dies of old age after several decades have passed. Kuro thanks Keita and wishes him to rest in peace.
Kuro (クロ)
Voiced by: Noriko Shitaya (Japanese); Laura Bailey (English)
Keita's partner. As a child, she was the princess of the Tera Guardians. However, tragedy met up with her when her most cherished brother slaughtered her whole tribe. She came to the human world to stop him. Her manga version fights using boxing, having learned it from a former professional boxer, while her anime version does not have any particular style. Both, however, use an Exceed which massively increases her offensive power. In the anime, her exceed is the Mega-exe, though in episode 16 it changes to Giga-exe when Keita and Kuro connect their Tera to become one and later it became Terra-exe in episode 22 it the help of Akane's Tera.
Kuro has a crush on Keita, proving so in Episode 22, though she never confessed how she felt to Keita.
Akane Sano (佐野 茜, Sano Akane)
Voiced by: Sayaka Ohara (Japanese); Julie Ann Taylor (English)
Keita's childhood friend who has romantic feelings toward him. Her Doppeliner is Reishin's partner, Yuki Kaionji. In the anime, she is later to be revealed to be Reishin's contractee after the Holy Land appeared, and also known to be the ultimate Master Root.
In the final episode, Akane is married to Keita, changing her name to Akane Ibuki.
Punipuni (プニプニ)
Voiced by: Yumi Touma (Japanese); Michael Sinterniklaas (English)
Kuro's pet dachshund pup. He is often shown stealing food from Kuro's plate, causing the master and pet to launch into one of their fights, he can be found most of the time hiding in Kuro's shirt.

=== Supporting characters ===
Excel (エクセル, Ekuseru)
Voiced by: Yukari Tamura (Japanese); Stephanie Sheh (English)
Her real name is Maria. After she is rescued by Steiner from "Alter Egos", who killed her younger brother, she asks Steiner to make a contract with her to make Steiner stronger. Her childlike appearance is the result of a mutation caused by her contract with Steiner; it severely slows down her physical growth and aging process. As a veteran contractee, she has gained considerable experience and a keen insight. She possesses several combat accessories called "Thousands", but only two are shown in the manga. One is the "Hexa Ring" which creates an energy shield that can blocks attacks, while the other one is the ring she gave to Keita. In an omake, it is revealed that the contract between them has lasted for a century. In the anime, she was rescued by one of Steiner's split images during the climax of Steiner and Reishin's showdown. She is also shown to have a romantic interest in Keita, proven by kissing him. She later forms a contract with Mikami Houjou to avenge the death of Steiner and Shingo. In the manga, she and Steiner are missing after their infiltration mission to the Kaionji base of operations. She survives the mission though she loses her left leg. She is shown living with Mikami.
Steiner (シュタイナー, Shutainā)
Voiced by: Jōji Nakata (Japanese); Patrick Seitz (English)
A high Tera Guardian of the German High-Council. He prides himself on his unparalleled combat skills that single him out from the many high Tera Guardians employed at "The Noble One". He also possesses nerves of steel, those don't prevent him from getting his personal feelings mixed up in his duties. Steiner's Exceed, "Stampede", allows him to split himself into clones with equal mass and power to attack the enemy. Though the clones follow the command of the original body, they can also judge the situation of the fight autonomously. In the anime, he dies during the fight at Pure Island. In the manga, he sacrifices himself to ensure Excel's escape during their infiltration mission.
Yakumo (八雲)
Voiced by: Hirofumi Nojima (Japanese); Wil Wheaton (All but Ep. 13), Taliesin Jaffe (Episode 13 only) (English)
A Tera Guardian belonging to Kuro's clan. He is quite strong but tries to avoid getting into fights as much as possible. However, despite this, he would gladly sacrifice himself in order to protect Kuro or Riona.
Riona Kogure (木暮月 里緒奈, Kogure Riona)
Voiced by: Shizuka Itō (Japanese); Emily Bauer (English)
Yakumo's contractee. She is a Main Root who escaped from the Kaionji Group when she learned they were planning on conducting experiments on humans like her. She has a crush on Yakumo, and is always worried about him if he risks his life to protect her.
Kakuma (かくま)
Voiced by: Eri Kitamura (Japanese); Amanda Schuckman (English)
One of the three survivors of the Hima clan. He is one of the twins of the former leader whose entire clan was killed by Reishin and Hiyou in their attempt to destroy the Tera Stone. In the manga, Kakuma's contractee is Keita's grandfather Nagamine Ryujin. Kakuma sacrifices his life and turns into the Tera Stone after the original Tera Stone was destroyed by Hiyou. Kakuma's Exceed is "Shining Gallop", which takes the form of a white galloping horse. In the anime however, he was sacrificed in order to annihilate the barrier and open the path to the Pure Land, the island holding the Tera Stone.
Makana (まかな)
Voiced by: Eri Sendai (Japanese); Kether Donahue (English)
Kakuma's sister. She shares a very strong connection to her brother, realizing at once when Kakuma was killed. In the manga, she was left in the protection of The Noble Ones under Bernhard.
Nam (ナム, Namu)
Voiced by: Yukana (Japanese); Bella Hudson (English)
A Sanshinryon, the rough Korean equivalent of a Tera Guardian, she came to Japan to star in a TV show, but due to her naivety got conned out of most of her money and had her luggage stolen, which also included her recommendation letter and directions to the TV studio. She eventually ended up freeloading at Keita's house after trying to cook Punipuni for a meal. She is highly skilled and wields a Thousand which takes the form a sword capable of banishing spirits.

=== Kaionji Group ===
Reishin (黎真)
Voiced by: Katsuyuki Konishi (Japanese); Crispin Freeman (English)
Kuro's brother. He is the central antagonist for most of the series. He is the creator of the Doppeliner system. His mother, the priestess of the Shishigami (Lion God) clan, told him of her prophecy that either he would lead the tribe into prosperity and everlasting order under his rule as "a bringer of peace" or he would be "a bringer of destruction" crushing all in his path. During the fight at Pure Island, he is betrayed by Kuraki in episode 12 of the anime. His contractee is Akane, which they formed the contract when the Holy Land appeared.
In order to protect his sister, he killed almost everyone in the clan because they are under orders to kill Kuro due to her being a Masagami. He dies after destroying the two Masagami, but the Masagami quickly revive after his death.
Reishin is also in love with Yuki. After her apparent death, he forms a pact with Akane due to her being Yuki's doppeliner in order to save her from dying.
Daichi Kuraki (蔵木 大地, Kuraki Daichi)
Voiced by: Satoshi Hino (Japanese); Christopher Kromer (English)
Daichi's real identity was Keita's best friend, Shun Sawamura, during his junior high school years. Shun's doppeliner, who was the real Daichi Kuraki, committed suicide by jumping into a moving train. Shun was mistaken as Daichi during the funeral, due to their facial similarities as doppeliners; taking advantage of the mix up, Shun took on this new identity in order to rise up the ranks of the Kaionji Group. During his infiltration, Shun began to investigate the death of Keita's mother which led him to discover the Doppeliner rule. Shun does not share Reishin's perspective on the new world and consequently betrays him.
Eventually, with Reishin's demise, he has been promoted by the Kaionji Group's Chairperson.
Yuki Kaionji (魁音寺 雪, Kaionji Yuki)
Voiced by: Satsuki Yukino (Japanese); Veronica Taylor (English)
She is the daughter of the chairperson of the Kaionji Group. She desires to become a Master root in order to surpass her brothers and sisters, thus forming a contract with Reishin. However, she is only a sub of Akane Sano. She died in a helicopter crash when she and Akane escaped from the hotel.
She is also in love with Reishin, and after his disappearance, she has lost meaning in her life and becomes increasingly depressed.
Raiga (雷呀)
Voiced by: Eiji Miyashita (Japanese); Matt Caplan (English)
The Tera Guardian with whom Daichi has a contract with. As the sole surviving member of the Kiba clan, he seeks revenge against Reishin. His Exceed is the "Seeding Sword".
He dies shortly after his defeat by Kuro and Keita.
Hiyō (ひよう, Hiyō)
Voiced by: Kenji Hamada (Japanese); Marc Diraison (English)
Tera Guardian who has a contract with Shinobu. His Exceed, "Maryuu Touda" allows him to freely manipulate the movement and state of water, allowing him to attack with condensed water bullets or stakes of ice as well as cause the blood of his opponent's to burst from their bodies. In the manga, he died after Kuro performed an Exceed on him. However, in the anime, his body is recovered by Kuraki who drains his Tera energy afterwards.
Shinobu Nanase (七瀬 忍, Nanase Shinobu)
Voiced by: Yumi Touma (Japanese); Carrie Keranen (English)
The sub of Keita's mother. She is a Minus/Negative Root capable of absorbing other humans' Tera energy and luck. She made a contract with Hiyō in order to escape from her inevitable death under the Doppeliner rule.
She dies after Hiyō is defeated.
Mikami Hojo (法帖 三神, Hōjō Mikami)
Voiced by: Yuko Kaida (Japanese); Mary Elizabeth McGlynn (English)
A Tera Guardian of the Ginko clan working for the Kaionji Group in exchange for the medicine her sub-type contractee, Shingo, reguires to stay alive. Her Exceed, "Renkoubushin", fortifies all of her physical attributes increasing both offensive and defensive abilities. After Shingo's death, she forms a pact with Excel.

== Terminology ==
Tera Guardian (元神霊, Mototsu Mitama)
God-like beings charged with maintaining the balance of existence. However, they can become corrupt which result in conflicts between them.
Doppeliner (ドッペルライナー, Dopperurainā)
One of three people with identical bodies and minds who share the same fate. In the manga Kuro explains that every normal human being begins as a Doppeliner. If two of them meet, they die. The luck and fate of the two go to the remaining person, who is then called the root, giving them unimaginable good luck. In the anime, this system was revealed to be a curse placed on humans by the Masagami.
Minus Root (マイナスルート, Mainasu Rūto)
When an Alter Ego kills the Doppeliner that should have become the Root, all the remaining luck flows into the Alter Ego, but it is negative luck, and a Minus Root has to constantly suck out Tera from others in order to survive else his or her Tera will continue to diminish.
Contract (契約)
A pact or a bond made between a human and a Tera Guardian through sharing limbs. In the manga, Kuro exchanges left arms with Keita to save his life and unwillingly formed a contract, while in the anime Kuro exchanges her heart after Keita was hit.
Synchro
The greatest initiation of a contract, usually when both partners have a shared will. When Synchro is reached, a Tera Guardian's power multiplies. However, Synchro is really strenuous on the human partner because the human shares all injuries the Tera Guardian receives.
Exceed (イクシード, Ikushīdo)
Abilities used in fighting by the Tera Guardian once Synchro has been initiated. Each Tera Guardian has a unique Exceed, and some may be dangerous to the human partner due to the high use of Tera.
Tribal Ends
Humans who have been given Tera Guardian powers by Tera Guardians.
Tera (テラ循環)
Spiritual life force that inhabits all life-forms. Tera Guardians usually form contracts with humans with high amounts of Tera because it enables them to use Exceed more often.
Alter Ego (逸れし者（アルターエゴ）, Arutā Ego)
A human who has met his Doppeliner, yet has not died. Alter Egos disrupt the coexistence balance. Tera Guardians, who are in charge of keeping the balance, carry out the deaths of Alter Egos to protect the coexistence balance.
Thousands (サウザンド, Sauzando)
Relics made by the Tera Guardians of old that are given to humans as a means of self defense. By channeling their Tera, these relics release specific effects (i.e. Excel's Hexa Ring creates the Hexa Shield which blocks attacks or heavy gravitational pull). It also has the ability to transfer Tera from one contractee to another.
Pure Place
Also known as Holy Land, a desolate area which few humans visit, surrounded by a barrier made by the Tera Guardians to keep away humans and preserve the Tera flow, keeping it pure. It houses the Master Tera Stone (Reiouseki) which binds the Masagami, a dark entity that is the physical manifestations of malice.
The Noble One, "TNO"
An alliance of four Tera Guardian groups in Europe, which was established with the goal of supporting fellow Tera Guardians, extinguishing Alter Egos and preserving the coexistence equilibrium. At present, they manage all of Europe, Central Asia, and part of Africa. At first the Tera Guardian's stance was not to interfere in human society at all, so they differ from the Tera Guardians of Japan and Asian countries who keep to that doctrine faithfully as they secretly have relations with major power structures of human society (like royalty, dynasties, religion, etc.)
The names of the four Tera Guardian groups in The Noble One are the Norman Majestic Council, the Celt Alliance, Roman Cognate and the German High-Council.

== Media ==
=== Manga ===
The manga adaptation of Black God has been serialized with 19 bound volumes already released to the public by Square Enix in Japan and in magazine form by Young Gangan. In North America and in the United Kingdom, Yen Press has already released Black God in English with 19 volumes translated and released. Its first volume was released on October 17, 2007.

Black God has also been released in France and also distributed in French-speaking countries and territories by Editions Ki-oon, but it was marketed under the title Kurokami: Black God from its original name. It was also released in Taiwan and distributed in Chinese-speaking countries and territories by Ching Win Publishing Co., Ltd., translated in the Traditional Chinese language.

Manga list
	(Japan) Square Enix		(South Korea) Daewon C.I.		(Taiwan) Ching Win Pub. Co.,		(United States) (United Kingdom) Yen Press		(France) Ki-oon	
	『黒神』(Kurokami)		《흑신》		《黑神》		Black God		Kurokami: Black God	
#	Date	ISBN	Date	ISBN	Date	ISBN	Date	ISBN	Date	ISBN
1	May 25, 2005	ISBN 978-4-7575-1443-0	June 30, 2005	ISBN 978-8952895530	November 1, 2006	ISBN 978-9861567518	October 30, 2007	ISBN 978-0-7595-2349-4	February 28, 2008	ISBN 978-2-35592-003-5
2	September 24, 2005	ISBN 978-4-7575-1528-4	September 30, 2005	ISBN 978-8959631513	January 15, 2007	ISBN 978-9861568133	February 5, 2008	ISBN 978-0-7595-2841-3	April 28, 2008	ISBN 978-2-35592-008-0
3	March 25, 2006	ISBN 978-4-7575-1644-1	March 28, 2006	ISBN 978-8925241364	February 15, 2007	ISBN 978-9861568423	June 10, 2008	ISBN 978-0-7595-2842-0	June 26, 2008	ISBN 978-2-35592-015-8
4	July 25, 2006	ISBN 978-4-7575-1724-0	July 31, 2006	ISBN 978-8925201375	March 15, 2007	ISBN 978-9861568638	October 28, 2008	ISBN 978-0-7595-2843-7	August 21, 2008	ISBN 978-2-35592-025-7
5	January 25, 2007	ISBN 978-4-7575-1913-8	February 15, 2007	ISBN 978-8925208787	May 1, 2007	ISBN 978-9861569208	February 17, 2009	ISBN 978-0-7595-2844-4	October 23, 2008	ISBN 978-2-35592-036-3
6	June 25, 2007	ISBN 978-4-7575-2017-2	June 30, 2007	ISBN 978-8925215952	September 1, 2007	ISBN 978-9862090862	June 9, 2009	ISBN 978-0-7595-3091-1	December 11, 2008	ISBN 978-2-35592-044-8
7	December 25, 2007	ISBN 978-4-7575-2184-1	February 1, 2008	ISBN 978-8925222233	February 20, 2008	ISBN 978-9862093054	October 27, 2009	ISBN 978-0-7595-3093-5	February 26, 2009	ISBN 978-2-35592-052-3
8	May 24, 2008	ISBN 978-4-7575-2279-4	July 30, 2008	ISBN 978-8925229249	July 9, 2008	ISBN 978-9862095164	February 23, 2010	ISBN 978-0-7595-3094-2	April 23, 2009	ISBN 978-2-35592-064-6
9	December 22, 2008	ISBN 978-4-7575-2447-7	January 30, 2009	ISBN 978-8925240626	March 16, 2009	ISBN 978-9862098035	May 18, 2010	ISBN 978-0-316-09765-9	June 2, 2009	ISBN 978-2-35592-081-3
10	February 25, 2009	ISBN 978-4-7575-2497-2	March 30, 2009	ISBN 978-8925243276	May 12, 2009	ISBN 978-9862098530	August 17, 2010	ISBN 978-0-316-10227-8	October 22, 2009	ISBN 978-2-35592-103-2
11	April 25, 2009	ISBN 978-4-7575-2546-7	July 30, 2009	ISBN 978-8925246000	July 7, 2009	ISBN 978-9862099308	November 30, 2010	ISBN 978-0-316-10228-5	January 28, 2010	ISBN 978-2-35592-122-3
12	July 25, 2009	ISBN 978-4-7575-2621-1	September 30, 2009	ISBN 978-8925250311	September 24, 2009	ISBN 978-9862560006	March 29, 2011	ISBN 978-0-316-10230-8	March 25, 2010	ISBN 978-2-35592-137-7
13	December 25, 2009	ISBN 978-4-7575-2756-0	February 26, 2010	ISBN 978-8925257174	March 20, 2010	ISBN 978-9862562215	June 19, 2011	ISBN 978-0-316-18821-0	June 24, 2010	ISBN 978-2-35592-172-8
14	May 25, 2010	ISBN 978-4-7575-2857-4	July 30, 2010	ISBN 978-8925264769	August 18, 2010	ISBN 978-9862564257	October 25, 2011	ISBN 978-0-316-18961-3	October 28, 2010	ISBN 978-2-35592-208-4
15	September 25, 2010	ISBN 978-4-7575-3003-4	November 30, 2010	ISBN 978-8925270982	January 21, 2011	ISBN 978-9862566367	January 31, 2012	ISBN 978-0-316-18962-0	March 24, 2011	ISBN 978-2-35592-252-7
16	February 25, 2011	ISBN 978-4-7575-3148-2	May 30, 2011	ISBN 978-8925279237	May 18, 2011	ISBN 978-9862567753	April 10, 2012	ISBN 978-0-316-20487-3	August 18, 2011	ISBN 978-2-35592-296-1
17	August 25, 2011	ISBN 978-4-7575-3343-1	October 30, 2011	ISBN 978-8925289090	May 10, 2012	ISBN 978-9863101765	October 30, 2012	ISBN 978-0-316-22535-9	February 23, 2012	ISBN 978-2-35592-360-9
18	January 25, 2012	ISBN 978-4-7575-3455-1	March 30, 2012	ISBN 978-8925296012	September 16, 2012	ISBN 978-9863103394	January 22, 2013	ISBN 978-0-316-23193-0	July 5, 2012	ISBN 978-2-35592-417-0
19	August 25, 2012	ISBN 978-4-7575-3705-7	August 30, 2012	ISBN 978-8967254797	May 8, 2013	ISBN 978-9863106043	May 28, 2013	ISBN 978-0-316-25089-4	January 24, 2013	ISBN 978-2-35592-439-2

=== Anime ===
The anime adaptation of Black God was produced by Sunrise, directed by Tsuneo Kobayashi with Reiko Yoshida as the series' supervisor and Hiroyuki Nishimura as the series' animation director and chief character designer.

Among the Japanese voice actors involved in the Sunrise production include Noriko Shitaya, who played Kuro, and Daisuke Namikawa as Keita. Other voice actors for the production include Sayaka Ohara as Akane Sano, Yukari Tamura as Excel, and Jōji Nakata as Steiner. Its title is called Kurokami: The Animation or Black God: The Animation. The anime aired on Japanese TV is in January 2009. Kurokami: The Animation aired first on January 8, 2009, simultaneously in Japan on TV Asahi and in the United States on ImaginAsian, followed by South Korea on January 9, 2009, in AniBOX.

The voice actors for its US broadcast include Jason Griffith, who played Keita, Laura Bailey as Kuro with Julie Ann Taylor playing Akane and Stephanie Sheh as Excel.

Bandai released the Blu-ray and DVD sets of the anime in March 2010. Following the 2012 closure of Bandai Entertainment, Sunrise announced at Otakon 2013, that Sentai Filmworks has rescued Kurokami, along with a handful of other former BEI titles. On October 16, 2023, Discotek Media announced that they had licensed the show for a 2024 release.

== Reception ==
Eye on Anime's review praised the manga due to its storyline, but has criticized Keita for having most of the reader's initial attention due to his arrogant and disrespectful attitude and character. Matthew Alexander of Mania.com noted Black God for having good character development and creative fight scenes, not to mention that it has an excellent and thrilling storyline for readers to follow into without any trouble.

About.com's review said that Black God was good for the combination of various genres including action, drama, suspense, humor combined with the theme of the supernatural in its story and at the same time, questions the need of having fanservice in the manga as the review insists that it is not necessarily needed in the first place. UK Anime Net's Review said that the art is "solid, imaginative layout. It never looks rushed and the paneling flows smoothly." Comic Book Resources pointed out that the fanservice being portrayed in the manga was rather amusing and not offensive as it was the main source of Black God's humor.

Comics Village criticized Black God heavily for having questionable aspects of the storyline being left out initially without being given the chance to have them fully explained to its readers, which can make them a bit confused. On the other hand, it singles out the art and character details at its strong side, with the latter being greatly detailed without being overdone with the "use of speed lines for action scenes and moments of emotion."
