= NOW (manhwa) =

Korean manwha

- Cover of the Infinity Studios edition of NOW vol. 2 (2005), art by Park Sung-woo

나우 RR: Nau MR: Nau
- Genre: Action/adventure
- Author: Park Sung-woo
- Publisher: (South Korea) Seoul Munhwasa
- English publisher: (United States) Infinity Studios
- Other publishers: (Malaysia) Tora Aman
- Magazine: (South Korea) IQ Jump Comics
- Original run: 2001–2007
- Collected volumes: 25

NOW (Korean: 나우; Hanja: 儺雨) is a manhwa by Park Sung-woo. It is published by Seoul Munhwasa and serialized in the weekly magazine IQ Jump Comics. It was printed in the United States by ComicsOne until it closed, and then distributed by Infinity Studios, who mainly published newer volumes digitally, until it was also defunct, leaving the series incomplete to English-speakers.

== Story ==
The story of NOW is set in Goguryeo and stars Bi-Ryu, a martial artist, and Ah-Rin, a bubbly girl with a sword, as they go on various adventures. The series is currently finished with 25 volumes in South Korea and up to 6 volumes in United States. NOW is an action/fighting oriented comic targeted towards male fans.

== Characters ==
=== Sa-Shin-Mu disciples ===
Pa Goon-Sung's disciples

- Bi-Ryu (Korean: 비류; Hanja: 沸流; RR: Biryu)

The main character of NOW. Practitioner of the "Sashinmu" (사신무) killing style. He has distinct silver colored hair. He was the adopted grandson of North Star, and holds himself responsible for North Star's death. He seems to be developing a crush on Rin. Bi-Ryu is a rather simple young man, unable to catch up with the times on his own. This is shown when he and Ah-Rin prepare to embark on their quest. She asks if he is all packed, and if so, where are his things. He casts a finger to Cho-Ryung in response. He also had casually walked in on Yhun Ah-Rin and Cho Ryung in a bath, Bi Ryu asked directions and left as though she was not naked, Cho Ryung seems to have the same casualness. However, he is merciless in combat, referring to himself as a Sa-Shin, a death god. He has been shown to descend into a ferocious killing rage during battle, with Ah-Rin being the only one able to return him to normal.

- Yu Sae-Ha (Korean: 유세하; Hanja: 劉世河; RR: Yu Seha)

One of the male protagonists of NOW. A good person at first but is becomes twisted and evil by a traumatic incident in the first volume. Originally sent with his brothers to destroy Sashinmu's secrets upon his swordmaster's last wishes. He discovered his older brother had secretly been working for an opposing force, and was nearly killed by him. It was this brother's sword that left the scar on his cheek. Together, the two plunge into a chasm, and he barely survived unlike his brother. He acquires the Sashinmu killing technique from reading the Sashinmu book with the purpose of changing the world so as to acknowledge his strength and, indirectly, his reason for existing. Yu Sae-Ha's style of Sashinmu is unique, for it utilizes negative (ice / Yin) ki instead of positive (fire / Yang) ki, as a result of him having absorbed Yhun Ah-Ran's ki. Originally starting out as a shy and timid character, Yu Sae-Ha grows obsessed with power as the story goes on, willing to do anything to become stronger. He harbors feelings for Yhun Ah-Ran.

Yhun Oh-Rhang's disciples

- Yhun Ah-Rin (Korean: 연아린; Hanja: 延娥璘; RR: Yeon Arin)

The 15-year-old female protagonist of NOW. Though powerful thanks to her father's transferred Sashinmu energy, she is considered a bit of a klutz. She seems to be developing a romantic interest upon Bi-Ryu, starting from when Bi Ryu saw her naked body, her mother and sister have told her she has to marry the first man to see her naked body. Her mother, the legendary Whur Ha-Rhang(Lunar Ice in English version) (월하랑), has trained both her and her sister in the heavenly mountain sword stance, which constantly circulates a type of internal ki to accentuate constant movement in battle. However, when Ah-Rin was younger, she accidentally ingested a poisonous herb. To save her life, her father transmitted some of his own Sashinmu energy to her, thus saving her life and at the same time preventing her from mastering the sword stance at her current level.

- Yhun Ah-Ran (Korean: 연아란; Hanja: 延娥蘭; RR: Yeon Aran)

Elder sister of Yhun Ah-Rin. Ah-Rin is much more stoic than her sister. After a confrontation with Bi-Ryu, she is left injured and drained of energy. It is here that she is captured and taken to Mother Demon's palace, where she is held captive until Yu-Sae Ha rescues her. It is discovered that she had killed Demon Mother's younger brother in an earlier confrontation during her search for Rin. She is eventually paired up with Yu Sae-Ha in a secondary storyline. Unlike her sister, Ah-Ran seems to have nearly, if not completely, mastered the stance, as she has displayed advanced techniques. However, as Yu Sae-Ha has absorbed her ki, it is unknown whether or not she is still able to fight.

Gi-Wang-Mu's disciple traveling with Bi-Ryu

- Cho-Ryung (Korean: 초령; Hanja: 貂鈴; RR: Choryeong)

A feral cat-like girl that is the traveling companion of Ah-Rin and Bi-Ryu. She is unable to talk and instead makes animal-like noises to communicate. It is speculated that she is the creation of Mother Demon. Bi-Ryu considers her a simple piece of property, to which she holds no objection to. She is very powerful, able to make off with Ah-Rin's rather heavy sword at the beginning of the series holding it only by her teeth. Cho-Ryung, like most animals, despises water and only after being caught and forced will she bathe.

=== Myung Wang Shin Gyo ===
(Korean: 명왕신교; Hanja: 明王神教; RR: Myeong Wang Sin Gyo)

Head

- The former head

She was also a reincarnation of Parvati. She is the eldest sister of Shiva and Ganesha. During a war between the Shaolin and the Myeong Wang Shin Gyo, she sacrificed herself by throwing her own body into fire in order to save Shiva and the Myong Wang Shin Gyo children.

- Nirvana (니르바나)

A little girl introduced in volume 4, Nirvana is not all she appears to be. She is Indian and is first seen as a child who Ah-Gi has taken to kill and make into food. Bi-Ryu and Ah-Rin show up just in time to save her, though she shows no fear towards the man. He believes her to be a mute, as she has not spoken since he abducted her. Later, after meeting Bi Ryu's Party she speaks slowly with future predictions, accurately predicting Yhun Ah-Rin kicking Bi Ryu. It is also known that she apparently is wanted, as a group of assassins intrude upon Bi-Ryu's party and attempt to kill them to take Nirvana. She seems to like Cho Ryung, as she hugs her like a stuffed animal a lot (She's also the only one who can understand what Cho Ryung says). She carries the memory of the former heads of Myung Wong Shin Gyo, Parvati.

Chief minister and left-right ministers

- Asura (아수라)

The former chief minister of Myung Wong Shin Gyo, master of Shiva. He and Sho-Rhim's head Cheon Jong were former friends, they planned to keep the peace between Chinese Martial World and Myung Gyo, but failed by the evil Sho-Rhim monk Cheon Seung, who only followed the way of power.

- Brahma Brothers

They were the ministers of Myung Wong Shin Gyo, in the generation of Shiva's eldest sister.

After the Cult's House had been destroyed, they served Shiva as new chief minister. When they discovered that Shiva was using Yaksha's seal to create Ananga, they attempted to stop him but were defeated. The elder lost his eyes and two arms, while the younger lost the lower body. They combined to form a body to protect together. They taught Yu Sae-Ha the secret skill of Gyu Yeom — grandmaster of Sa-Shin-Mu — Pa-Yeol-Jin (Destroying Quake).

- Shiva (시바)

Chief minister of Myeong Wang Shin Gyo. He used Yaksha's seal to create the Ananga to assist him in the way to destroy the Chinese Martial World.

- Lakshmi (라크슈미)

Head of the security detail in Myeong Wang Shin Gyo. She and Ganesha make up the Ministers of the Right and Left respectively. Her primary duty is to provide security to the Chief Minister (Shiva). Her and Ganesha are apparently not on good terms. It is said that her powers are on par with Ganesha, but she is not the "brute force" type. Instead, she is known to make deals and use subversive methods to do her job. She often passes herself off as the "lovely little lady". When Ganesha returns with Yu Sae-Ha and Yhun Ah-Rin, Shiva requests that she "lightly spar" with Yu Sae-Ha. She displays here her actual strength, seeming to teleport to and from. It also seems her physical strength is above average, as with one kick, she sends Yu Sae-Ha flying upwards into the air, despite his unintentional defense. She also cares much for Rakshasha, despite her attempts to deny it.

- Ganesha (가네샤)

The head of security in the Myung Wong Shin Gyo. He seems to be a controlling man, telling Ran and Rin's parents he had come to handle business with Mother Demon, but became captivated with their fighting skills. His apparently true purpose of coming was to obtain the secrets of Sashinmu. He seems to be powerful as well, escaping from the two skilled warriors with the only damage received the losing of the bottom portion of his mask. He entices Yu Sae-Ha to accompany him to Myeong Wang Shin Gyo along with Yhun Ah-Ran. It is later revealed that he is the twin (younger) brother of Shiva, and that he only takes off his mask when he is needed to "stand in" for Shiva in certain situations.

Chil-Rhun-Sa (Seven-Wheels Children)

(Korean: 칠륜자; Hanja: 七輪子; RR: Chillyunja)

- Cheong Mo (Korean: 청목; Hanja: 靑木; RR: Cheongmok)

Il-Rhun (Korean: 일륜; Hanja: 日輪; RR: Illyun, Sun Wheel)
A Westerner who, as a child, was brought into the East as a slave. He has the skill Dok-Shim-Sul (Mind-Reading Skill), as well as high-level Qing Gong. He tested Bi Ryu's strength before revealing him the way to the Myeong Wang Shin Gyo.

- Unknown member - Whur-Rhun (Korean: 월륜; Hanja: 月輪; RR: Wollyun, Moon Wheel)

He is the assassin sent to kill Ah-Rin in Mo-Yong house. But he is killed by Ja Hye and Mo-Yong Bi. In the end, he puts a joke: "I'm killed so fast that I can't present my name!".

- Akni (아크니)

Hwa-Rhun (Korean: 화륜; Hanja: 火輪; RR: Hwaryun, Fire Wheel)

- Baraha (바라하)

To-Rhun (Korean: 토륜; Hanja: 土輪; RR: Toryun, Earth Wheel)
Is his best status in the ground. Defeated by Bi-Ryu.

- Matshia (마트시아)

Sue-Rhun (Korean: 수륜; Hanja: 水輪; RR: Suryun, Water Wheel)
Is his best battle status in the deep water. Defeated by Ah-Rin.

- Hanuman (하누만)

Mok-Rhun (Korean: 목륜; Hanja: 木輪; RR: Mongnyun, Wooden Wheel)
Uses the poisonous insects to eliminate opponents. Defeated by Mo-Yong Rin and Hyun.

- Rakshasha (라크샤샤)

Kim-Rhun (Korean: 금륜; Hanja: 金輪; RR: Geumnyun, Metal Wheel)
Best in assassination. Defeated by Ah-Ran.

Gwi-Wang-Mo's faction (Lady Demon King Mother)

- Gwi-Wang-Mo (Korean: 귀왕모; Hanja: 鬼王母; RR: Gwiwangmo)

An old lady with powerful strength. She raised Cho Ryung, So Goon, Shi Rang, and the Mae Ran Guk Juk. Her desire to become the strongest in the Wulin World went to smoke when she met Yhun Orang. Ultimately, she died by the hands of Lakshmi, but not before showing last bit of kindness to her pupil, So Gun.

- So Gun (Korean: 소군; Hanja: 昭君; RR: Sogun)

A beautiful cross-dressing boy. He used to envy "Baek-Rhang-Gyeon" (White Wolf-Dog), who actually is Cho-Ryung, because his master praised her very highly. After his master's death, he sets out to seek revenge against Ma Yeom Cheol, who he mistakenly believed had killed his master.

- Shi Rang (Korean: 시랑; Hanja: 豺狼; RR: Sirang)

Another cross-dressing boy in Gi-Wang-Mu's faction. After Cho-Ryung's escape, the Demon Mother had Shi Rang wearing the hand-claws with hope equal to Cho-Ryung's ability.

- The four sisters

Mae, Ran, Guk, Juk (Korean: 매란국죽; Hanja: 梅蘭菊竹; RR: Mae Ran Guk Juk) are the guardian quadruplets protecting their master. They are later "freed" after So Gun, who wished them to experience freedom, decided to undertake the revenge for his master by himself. Their names are flowers: Ochna, Orchid, Chrysanthemum, Phyllostachys

Others

- Britra (브리트라)

A powerful fighter of Myung Wong Shin Gyo. He provoked Sae-Ha and Ah-Ran when they first came there. Defeated and killed by Sae-Ha after his training with the Brahma brothers, two former ministers of Myung Wong Shin Gyo in Shiva's eldest sister's generation.

- Ah-Gi (Korean: 아귀; Hanja: 餓鬼; RR: Agwi)

An evil monk who is also a cannibal. He wields a cooking knife attached to a chain, which emits loud clinking sounds meant to distract the opponent during battle and perhaps make up for a lack of physical strength. He flaunts himself as a master cook. As the story progresses, Ah-Gi becomes more of a comic relief character than an actual threat. He has his own pages, located at the end of the Manhwa, called "Ask Ah-Gi," a short comical strip of few pages where he (supposedly) answers questions from the readers, often involving Ah-Rin and Ah-Ran, and ends up getting beaten up/stabbed/slashed/etc. by the two girls.

- Dharma (다르마)

An antagonist introduced in volume 4, he is a large muscular man with dark skin. His weapon is a spear named Shin-Chang NAGA that absorbs all his negative ki thus giving him the ability to hide his ki in fights. He is defeated by Bi Ryu, after mortally wounding Yhun Ah Rin. This inspires Bi-Ryu to "pass judgement" and deliver the "Seven Dark Star Attacks" upon the man and finally kill him. His last sight is that of Nirvana, whom he states is the Founder of Myeong Wang Shin Gyo.

- Seop Poong (섭풍)

An assassin from Gi-Ryung-Bae, an assassin faction. He is the younger brother of Seop Jung, who was killed by Whur Ha-Rhang in The Legend of the Sirius. Followed by the author, his name came from the name of the protagonist of the manhua Feng Yun, Nie Feng.

- Ma Yeom-Cheol (Korean: 마염철; Hanja: 馬炎鐵; RR: Ma Yeomcheol)

Also known as Ryong-Ma-Do-Jae (Korean: 용마도제; Hanja: 龍馬刀帝; RR: Yongmadoje) (Longma Saber's Emperor). His daughter is kept hostage by Myeong Wang Shin Gyo, so he must obey the cult's orders. He was ordered to kill the Mother of the Demon King, but before he would do so, Lakshmi intervened and killed the Mother.

== Other martial artists ==
=== Yhun Oh-Rhang's family ===
- Yhun Oh-Rhang (Korean: 연오랑; Hanja: 延烏郞; RR: Yeon Orang)

Only one to have mastered the complete sashinmu, Yhun Oh-Rhang is said to be even stronger than Pa Goon-Sung, the eldest disciple of Gyu Yeom. He is also the father of Yhun Ah-Rin and Yhun Ah-Ran.

- Whur Ha-Rhang (Korean: 월하랑; Hanja: 月下浪; RR: Wol Harang)

Master of Heavenly Mountain Sword Stance and also mother of Yhun Ah-Rin and Yhun Ah-Ran.

=== Gyu Yeom's disciple ===
- Ghyur Mah-Ro (Korean: 결마로; RR: Gyeol Maro)

He's a person from Goguryeo (고구려), teacher of Ah-Rin. In the war between Goryeo and Chinese Martial World, he killed Ja Hye's sisters so when he met Mo Yong Bi again, he cut one of his arms to apologize.

=== Shin Ryong Moon (Shen Long Faction) ===
- Juk Woon (Korean: 적운; Hanja: 赤雲; RR: Jeogun)
- So-Hyang (Korean: 소향; Hanja: 小香; RR: Sohyang)

=== Mo-Yong Bi's family ===
- Mo-Yong Bi (Korean: 모용비; Hanja: 慕容琵; RR: Moyong Bi)

In his younger days Mo-Yong Bi has fought Yhun Oh-Rhang and Ghyur Mah-Ro as enemies. However since those days he has corrected his ways and gave up fighting and picked up medical skill (holistic medical skills are very close to pressure point based martial arts).

- Ja Hye (Korean: 모용비; RR: Jahye)

She was a servant/assassin to Mo-Yong Bi in his younger days. NOWJa Hye is Mo-Yong Bi's wife. During the fight between Yhun Oh-Rhang, Ghyur Mah-Ro, and Mo-Yong Bi, Ja Hye has lost two of her younger sister who were also Mo-Yong Bi's servant/assassin.

- Mo-Yong Rin (Korean: 모용린; Hanja: 慕容璘; RR: Moyong Rin)

The adopted daughter of Mo-Yong Bi.

- Mo-Yong Hyun (Korean: 모용현; Hanja: 慕容賢; RR: Moyong Hyeon)

The adopted son of Mo-Yong Bi.

=== Sho-Rhim-Sa (Shaolin Temple) ===
Head

- Cheon Jong (Korean: 천종; Hanja: 天宗; RR: Cheonjong)

The former friend of Asura. He and Asura wanted to prevent the battle of Myung Gyo and Mu- Rhim (World of Martial Artists).
Elders

They are the elder monks of Sho-Rhim Temple. Their name are Cheon Kwang, Cheon Gak, Cheon Seung, Cheon Woon.

- Cheon Seung (천승)

Though he is not Sho-Rhim's head, he is the most powerful monk.

=== Others ===
- Im Chol-Sim (Korean: 임철심; Hanja: 林哲心; RR: Im Cheolsim)

An old man who was an expert martial artist, but retired. He saved Bi-Ryu and Ah-Rin after their fight against Dharma.

== Notes ==
- NOWis a sequel to an earlier Sung-woo Park manhwa, Cheollang Yeoljeon (Legend of the Sirius), which featured Yhun Oh-Rhang and Whur Ha-Rhang, the parents of Yhun Ah-Rin and Ah-Ran. Thus the significance of some characters and story might be lost without reading the prequel.
- This manhwa was formerly distributed in the United States in English by ComicsOne. It was later acquired by Infinity Studios.
- The Sa-Shin-Mu Martial Art is divided to five ways: Cheong-Ryong, Baek-Ho, Hyeon-Mu, Ju-Jak and Hwang-Ryong. In these ways, the Hwang-Ryong is the most powerful. The five ways are based on the Ssu Ling Gods of Chinese mythology: Qing Long, Bai Hu, Xuan Wu, Zhu Que and Huang Long. A disciple only learns it when he can remove his killing aura. The ultimate skills are "Pa-Yeol-Jin" and "Mu-Jin", "Pa-Yeol-Jin" is the most powerful skill of killing sashinmu, and "Mu-Jin" is the most powerful skill in the complete sashinmu.
- The faction "Myung Wong Shin Gyo" or shortcut to "Myung Gyo" is the cult "Ming Jiao" (明教), a Persian Cult which is called "Mo Jiao" (魔教, Demonic Cult) by the Chinese martial artists. The story of this faction is told in Jin Yong's novel Yi Tian Tu Long Ji (the tale about Yitian-jian, the heavenly sword, and Tulong-dao, the dragon saber).
- If you read the manhwa carefully, you will notice the names of Myung Gyo's members are based on the names in Hindu mythology. Examples are Shiva, Nirvana, Ganesha, Lakshmi, Rakshasha, Akni, Hanuman, Baraha, Asura, etc.

== Publishers ==
NOW was originally published by ComicsOne Corp. On 15 June 2005 Infinity Studios LLC took over publishing, announced that will be republishing the first 5 volumes in the series.

== See also ==
- Chun Rhang Yhur Jhun
