= Tadokoro-san =

Japanese manga series

- First tankōbon volume cover, featuring Sakurako Nikaidou (left) and Kageko Tadokoro (right)

田所さん
- Genre: Romantic comedy; Slice of Life; Yuri
- Manga
- Written by: Tatsubon
- Published by: Self-published (webcomic)
- English publisher: NA: Lilyka
- Original run: November 22, 2018 – February 21, 2022
- Manga
- Written by: Tatsubon
- Published by: Kill Time Communication
- Magazine: Comic Valkyrie
- Original run: August 13, 2019 – December 21, 2021
- Volumes: 4
- Manga

Inko-sensei
- Written by: Tatsubon
- Published by: Self-published (webcomic)
- Original run: November 13, 2022 – present

Tadokoro-san (田所さん) is a Japanese yuri manga series written and illustrated by Tatsubon. It was posted online via Tatsubon's Pixiv account from November 2018 to February 2022 and has been licensed for a digital release in English by Lilyka. It was later serialized in Kill Time Communication's Comic Valkyrie from August 2019 to December 2021, featuring new art and storylines from the original web version. Tadokoro-san is about the relationship between a shy girl who likes to draw and a popular girl in her class.

== Plot ==
When a popular high school student named Sakurako Nikaidou catches a glimmer of a picture that the shy class introvert Kageko Tadokoro is drawing, she instantly falls in love with her art style. Nikaidou then begins to secretly following Tadokoro's artist account on social media and gradually falls in love not only with her style but also with Tadokoro herself.

== Publication ==
Written and illustrated by Tatsubon, Tadokoro-san was posted online via Tatsubon's Pixiv account from November 22, 2018, to February 21, 2022. It was later serialized in Kill Time Communication's Comic Valkyrie from August 9, 2019, to December 21, 2021 before returning to Tatsubon's Pixiv and Nico Nico Manga accounts.

The web version is licensed for an English release in North America by Lilyka.

A sequel series, titled Inko-sensei (インコ先生), has been posted on Tatsubon's Pixiv account since November 13, 2022.

No.	Release date	ISBN
1	April 28, 2020	978-4-79-921367-4
2	October 28, 2020	978-4-79-921424-4
3	July 8, 2021	978-4-79-921519-7
4	January 8, 2022	978-4-79-921590-6

== Reception ==
Tadokoro-san was nominated for the 2019 Next Manga Award in the web manga category.
