= Cheollang Yeoljeon =

1997–2001 manhwa by Park Sung-woo

- Cover of the Infinity Studios edition of Cheollang Yeoljeon vol. 1 (2006), art by Park Sung-woo

천랑열전 RR: Cheollang yeoljeon MR: Ch'ŏllang yŏlchŏn
- Genre: Action/adventure
- Author: Park Sung-woo
- Publisher: (South Korea) Seoul Munhwasa
- English publisher: (United States) Infinity Studios
- Magazine: (South Korea) IQ Jump Comics
- Original run: 1997–2001
- Collected volumes: 10

Cheollang Yeoljeon (Korean: 천랑열전; Hanja: 天狼熱戰) is a South Korean manhwa by Park Sung-woo. It is distributed by Infinity Studios in the United States and serialized in the weekly manhwa magazine IQ Jump Comics.

== Plot ==
The story takes place in the mid 7th century, predominantly in Tang China and Goguryeo. Where Yhun Oh-Rhang is sent to find his eldest Hyung (brother), Pa Goon-Sung who disappeared after leaving for training in China years ago.

=== Sequel ===
NOW is the direct continuation of Cheollang Yeoljeon. It follows the descendants of Sashinmu and the daughters of two protagonists from Cheollang Yeoljeon. Along with them is the Myung Wang Shin Gyo from India.

== Characters ==
=== Main characters ===
- Yhun Oh-Rhang

The main character of Cheollang Yeoljeon is the third and youngest disciple of the famous warrior Kyu Yeom, who had developed a new martial art called "Sashinmu".

- Whur Ha-Rhang (or Wol Ha-Rhang)

The female protagonist of the story, she is a mysterious young woman who is the only disciple of the legendary Lady Chun-San-Gum-Nya (Swordswoman of Mt. Heaven).

=== Taiwon Samhyeop (Taiyuan's Three Generous Ones) ===
- Kyu Yeom

Master of the three: Pa Goon-Sung (eldest), Ghyur Mah-Ro (second) and Yhun Oh-Rhang (third). He had died before the series because of illness. He was Dai-Myak-Ryeo-Chyeo of Goguryeo.

- Lady Chun-San-Gum-Nya

Whur Ha-Rhang's Master and sole Master of Chun San Shin Gum or Divine Sword Dance of Mt Heaven and wielder of the Chung Sa Sword (Blue Snake Sword), she is known as the Swordswoman of Mt. Heaven. Its practitioners are required to master their emotions and keep them bound in icy calm. This emotionless state helps to master the potent han-ghi (cold energy) required to effectively use Chun San Shin Gum.

She was poisoned with Sub-Hyang-Han or Cold Leaf Fragrance that drained one of their internal energy and subsequently murdered.

- Master Jung

The third of Taiwon Samhyeop. He taught Yhun and Whur many things, about life and martial.

=== Juk-Rhim-O-Gwai (Zhu Lin's Five Goblins) ===
Also known as Five Goblins of Bamboo Forest. Three of them are killed by So Gwong-Bi.

- Dae Ho-Rhang

Eldest brother of Juk-Rhim-O-Gwai. Known as Il-Do-Sam-Sur. He's believed to have died but actually he is saved by master Jung.

- Baek Bong-Ok

Second brother of Juk-Rhim-O-Gwai. Known as Ran-Hwa-Do-Chang (Open Palm Wrath of War). His weapons are his speed, fans, and throwing darts. His signature technique is a quick moving palm attack from which he can throw darts from as well. He specializes in pressure point strikes due to his quick handspeed.

- Wang Pae

Third brother of Juk-Rhim-O-Gwai. Known as Hang-Ma-Wang. Very strong, he's capable of lifting and throwing almost boulder-sized rocks at his opponents.

- Sha Yoo-Rhang

Fourth brother of Juk-Rhim-O-Gwai. Known as Bong-Ma-Gon (Staff of Wind and Evil). Skilled in staff fighting, his only known attack is Hook-Ho-Choor-Dohng (Advance of the Black Tiger).

- Dahn Ryoung

The youngest sister of the Juk-Rhim-O-Gwai. She doesn't have much fighting skill, if any, so she sticks to acts of theft. Her theft of two items from Chung-Sue-Moon (The Chung-Sa Sword and a peculiar scroll) is what initially brought Ha-Rhang Whur to the Juk-Rhim-O-Gwai's doorsteps in pursuit of her master's murderer.

=== Chung Sue Moon (Qing Shui Faction) ===
- Suk Jung-Woong (or Seok Jung-Wung)

The Chief of "Chung Sue Moon" (Gates of Blue Water), one of the largest and most powerful clans in China.

==== Mu-Rhim-O-Sung (The Five Saints of Martial Arts) ====
- Goo Ma-So

A ruthless blind swordsman who is one of the "Mu-Rhim-O-Sung". His father was killed by Pa Goon Sung.

- Hong Goon

A beautiful but vicious young women who is another member of the "Mu-Rhim-O-Sung" her weapon of choice is a double-headed whip. Other one of "Mu-Rhim-O-Sung".

- Bi So-Gwong

Other one of "Mu-Rhim-O-Sung". Disciple of "Chung Sue Moon".

- Ma Won

Other one of "Mu-Rhim-O-Sung". Known as Geon-Shin (God of Fists).

Mo-Yong Bi's Group

- Mo-Yong Bi

Maybe the most powerful and talented one of "Mu-Rhim-O-Sung". Known as "O-Wang" (5th King). He also has the talent of Sirius (Chun Rhang) as Yhun Oh-Rhang.

- Ja sisters

The three sisters who bodyguard Mo-Yong Bi. Their names as their age following are Ja Hye, Ja Hong, Ja Hee (Ja Heh). They used to plan assassinating Lee Yeon-Bi with Ma Won. Two of them, Ja Hong and Ja Hee, are killed by Ghyur Mah-Ro.

=== Sashinmu Disciples & Goguryeo People ===
Kyu Yeom's Disciples

- Pa Goon-Sung

The first and eldest disciple of the master of Ghyur Mahro and Yhun Oh-Rhang. Known by his crime of killing many martial artists 20 years ago.

- Ghyur Mah-Ro

The 2nd disciple of Yhun Oh-Rhang's master, instead of learning Sashinmu their master taught him "Bi Hong Gum Soor" a powerful sword style and lady Yu Hwa calls him Goguryeo's finest swordmaster. He makes his first appearance in volume 2.

- Yhun Oh-Rhang

See above
Other Goguryeo People

- Yu Hwa

A lady from Goguryeo Dynasty. She falls for Oh-Rhang.

=== Shin Ryong Moon (Shen Long Faction) ===
- Sa Ma-Hyun

The head of "Shin Ryong Moon" (Gate of Godly Dragon).

- Kyeom Chun-Moo

The eldest disciple of "Shin Ryong Moon".

- Juk Woon

The second disciple of "Shin Ryong Moon".
Ok Yeon-Bi's Group

- Ok Yeon-Bi

His true name is Lee Yeon-Bi (known as Li Yanfei in Chinese), the 8th prince of Tang Dynasty. The disciple of "Shin Ryong Moon".

- Jin Mu

The trustful guard of Lee Yeon-Bi.

- Jin So-Young

Little sister of Mu Jin. She falls for Lee Yeon-Bi.

- Yak No

Doctor of Lee.

- Poong Kwan

Guard of Lee.

- Jung So-Pul

Actually he is sent to spy "Shin Ryong Moon" and prince Lee Yeon-Bi. Discovered when he nearly attacked So-Young.

=== Others ===
- Seop Jung

The head of Gi-Ryung-Bai, the faction of assassins. Sent to kill Whur but failed and died.

- So-Hyang

The girl who helps Oh-Rhang when he fell to the valley's river and was saved by master Jung.

== See also ==
- NOW (manhwa)
