= Freezing (manga) =

Japanese manga series

- Cover of the first manga volume featuring Satellizer el Bridget

フリージング (Furījingu)
- Genre: Action, science fiction
- Manga
- Written by: Dall-Young Lim
- Illustrated by: Kwang-Hyun Kim
- Published by: Kill Time Communication
- English publisher: NA: Seven Seas Entertainment
- Magazine: Comic Valkyrie
- Original run: January 27, 2007 – November 30, 2018 (on hiatus)
- Volumes: 33
- Anime television series
- Directed by: Takashi Watanabe
- Produced by: Shinsaku Tanaka; Takashi Tachizaki
- Written by: Masanao Akahoshi
- Music by: Masaru Yokoyama
- Studio: ACGT
- Licensed by: Crunchyroll
- Original network: AT-X (4:3, uncensored); Tokyo MX, CTC, SUN, TV Aichi, tvk, TV Saitama (16:9, censored)
- English network: US: Funimation Channel
- Original run: January 8, 2011 – April 7, 2011 (Note: Episodes 11 and 12 were delayed due to the 2011 Tōhoku earthquake and tsunami)
- Episodes: 12 + 6 OVAs
- Manga

Freezing: First Chronicle
- Written by: Dall-Young Lim
- Illustrated by: Jae-Ho Yoon
- Published by: Kill Time Communication
- Magazine: Comic Valkyrie
- Original run: September 27, 2011 – January 27, 2012
- Volumes: 1
- Manga

Freezing: Zero
- Written by: Dall-Young Lim
- Illustrated by: Soo-Cheol Jeong
- Published by: Kill Time Communication
- Magazine: Comic Valkyrie
- Original run: March 27, 2012 – September 4, 2015
- Volumes: 9
- Manga

Freezing Pair Love Stories
- Written by: Dall-Young Lim
- Illustrated by: So-Hee Kim
- Published by: Kill Time Communication
- Magazine: Comic Valkyrie
- Original run: March 27, 2013 – February 28, 2014
- Volumes: 3
- Anime television series

Freezing Vibration
- Directed by: Takashi Watanabe
- Produced by: Shō Tanaka; Satoshi Ōmori; Shingo Yokota; Tatsuya Ueki
- Written by: Masanao Akahoshi
- Music by: Masaru Yokoyama
- Studio: A.C.G.T
- Licensed by: Crunchyroll
- Original network: AT-X (4:3, uncensored); Tokyo MX, SUN, TV Aichi, BS11 (16:9, censored)
- Original run: October 4, 2013 – December 20, 2013
- Episodes: 12 + 6 OVAs
- Video game

Freezing Extension
- Developer: CREEK & RIVER Co., Ltd.
- Publisher: TRINITY GAMES
- Genre: Bishōjo, RPG, Strategy
- Platform: Android, iOS
- Released: August 23, 2018 –; October 31, 2019
- icon

Freezing (Japanese: フリージング, Hepburn: Furījingu) is a Japanese manga series written by Dall-Young Lim and illustrated by Kwang-Hyun Kim. The series revolves around the invasion of Earth by an interdimensional force called the Nova, and a special military group of genetically engineered young women called Pandoras. Pandoras fight alongside their male partners known as Limiters, who are created to combat the Nova. The story centers around Kazuya Aoi, a Limiter whose late sister was a Pandora, and Satellizer el Bridget, a Pandora with a cold personality who is known as the "Untouchable Queen" due to her intense aphephobia. Both are enrolled at West Genetics Academy, which is a training school for Pandoras and Limiters.

Freezing began serialization in Kill Time Communication's seinen manga magazine Comic Valkyrie in its March 2007 issue. The first collected volume was released on October 17, 2010, with a total of 28 volumes released as of August 27, 2015, under its Valkyrie Comics imprint. An English translation by Seven Seas Entertainment is also currently available. On August 12, 2010, an anime adaptation produced by A.C.G.T was announced, airing twelve episodes in Japan between January and April 2011 on AT-X and on other channels. The anime is licensed in North America by Funimation Entertainment, who released the series in August 2012. A second anime season titled Freezing Vibration (フリージング ヴァイブレーション, Furījingu Vaiburēshon) premiered on October 4, 2013.

There are currently three spin-off series based on the world of Freezing being published. The first spin-off, called Freezing: First Chronicle (フリージング ファーストクロニクル, Furījingu: Fāsuto Kuronikuru), was serialized in Comic Valkyrie from the November 2011 issue to the March 2012 issue. The second spinoff, called Freezing: Zero (フリージングZERO, Furījingu: Zero), began serialization in the May 2012 issue of Comic Valkyrie. A third spinoff, called Freezing Pair Love Stories (フリージング ペアラブストーリーズ), began serialization in the April 2013 issue of Comic Valkyrie.

== Plot ==
In 2065, Earth is in the middle of a war with extra-dimensional aliens called Nova. The military develops and trains Pandoras (パンドラ), girls who are able to use special genetic tissue called Stigmata (聖痕, Seikon) to manifest superhuman fighting skills and weapons. Supporting the Pandoras are male partners called Limiters (リミッター, Rimittā), who use special "freezing" powers to limit their opponent's mobility.

One of these Limiters is Kazuya Aoi, whose late sister was a Pandora. While attending West Genetics Academy in Japan, Kazuya meets Satellizer el Bridget, a powerful Pandora, nicknamed the Untouchable Queen, for her ruthless personality and her intense aphephobia. Despite warnings from his schoolmates to keep away from Satellizer, Kazuya befriends her, and asks to be her Limiter. After helping her through several fights against school rivals of varying ranks and classes, Satellizer agrees to partner with him, although she soon encounters a rival in romance named Rana Linchen, who thinks Kazuya is her soulmate. Their rivalry is put aside when the Novas attack their school using Pandoras under their control to access the school's underground lab.

Satellizer and Kazuya join a handful of West Genetics students at a research lab in Alaska, where they are to help with the Evolution Pandora (E-Pandora) project. The E-Pandora project allows ordinary girls to undergo Stigmata transplants and become Pandoras. When one of the E-Pandoras goes berserk, the others question whether the drugs in the experiment are safe, but are forced to comply with the director and the corporation's wishes. Upon discovering that they are considered expendable, the E-Pandora Amelia Evans leads a rebellion which escalates into a full-on Nova Clash.

Kazuya learns more about his family's connections to the Pandora and the Nova. Kazuya's grandfather Gengo Aoi launches a similar project, which puts Satellizer and Rana into a special team with girls called Valkyries. However, during the demonstration exercise with custom-designed dummy Nova, the Pandoras experience illusions, and the dummy Novas become a legion of hundreds of Nova that decimate Genetics. Gengo counters this by unleashing the Legendary Pandoras who are Kazuya's aunts. The Chevalier attempt to assassinate Gengo using a group of convicts called the Busters, but the mission falls apart when some of the Legendary Pandoras turn into deadly Novas due to the anti-freezing of the Busters, but they are defeated by the power of Kazuya's special freezing, and Arcadia 01, Daughter of Cassandra conceived from Kazuha's father which awakens from stasis in response to her brother's awakened power.

Before Chevalier launches another attack, Gengo moves on with his main plan, which involves sending Kazuya to Elca, the world from which the Novas come from to learn the truth about them. During his time there, he discovers that there might be a direct link between the two worlds with relation to Novas, Pandoras, and Limiters. There also appear to be several alternate versions of people he knows on Elca.

== Media ==
=== Manga ===
Written by Korean manhwa author Dall-Young Lim and illustrated by Kwang-Hyun Kim, Freezing began serialization in Kill Time Communication's male-oriented Japanese manga magazine Comic Valkyrie in its March 2007 issue. The first collected bound volume was released on October 26, 2007, with a total of thirty volumes sold in Japan as of August 26, 2016 under its Valkyrie Comics imprint. Freezing is split into two parts: Part 1 which ran from Volume 1 to Volume 14, spanning 96 chapters; and Part 2, going from Volume 15 onwards and currently ongoing in Comic Valkyrie. Outside Japan, Freezing is published in South Korea by Haksan Publishing and serialized in Booking; in France by Bamboo Edition under their Doki-Doki manga imprint; and in Taiwan by Tong Li Publishing. An English translation of Freezing is currently being published in 2-in-1 omnibus editions, starting with Volumes 1–2 by Seven Seas Entertainment in June 2015. As of early 2019, the manga has been put on indefinite hiatus due to circumstances regarding the authors.

A spinoff manga, called Freezing: First Chronicle (フリージング ファーストクロニクル, Furījingu: Fāsuto Kuronikuru), illustrated by Jae-Ho Yoon (the illustrator of Lim's light novel-based manhwa The Phantom King), began serialization in the November 2011 issue of Comic Valkyrie (released on September 27, 2011), and ran four chapters until the March 2011 issue (released January 27, 2012). A prequel to the original series, the story centers on Chiffon Fairchild and Ticy Phenyl's first year at West Genetics prior to them becoming Student Council President and Vice President, and also explains the origin of Chiffon's title, "The Unmatched Smiling Monster". First Chronicle was later released as a tankōbon volume on February 29, 2012.

A second spinoff manga, called Freezing: Zero (フリージングZERO, Furījingu: Zero), illustrated by Soo-Cheol Jeong (the illustrator of Lim's novel-based manhwa The Legend of Maian), began serialization in the May 2012 issue of Comic Valkyrie (published on March 27, 2012) and ended on September 4, 2015. Like First Chronicle before it, Zero is also a prequel to the original series, chronicling the back stories of many Pandoras prior to them attending Genetics. The first bound volume of Zero, centering on Kazuha Aoi's second year at West Genetics alongside Yumi and Elize, was released on August 29, 2012. Zero was collected into nine volumes.

A third spinoff manga, called Freezing Pair Love Stories (フリージング ペアラブストーリーズ), illustrated by So-Hee Kim, was serialized in Comic Valkyrie from April 2013 to March 2014 and was collected into three volumes.

=== Anime ===
An anime adaptation produced by A.C.G.T aired on AT-X from January 8 to April 2, 2011. The series aired uncensored in 4:3 format on AT-X, while the airing on Tokyo MX and other channels, which began on January 9, 2011, were in 16:9 widescreen format, albeit heavily censored. Episodes 11 and 12 were pushed back due to the 2011 Tōhoku earthquake and tsunami. Six DVD and Blu-ray volumes were released by Media Factory between March 23, 2011, and August 24, 2011, each volume containing two episodes and an original video animation called It'll Explode! Heart-Pounding Trouble♥Freezing (はじけちゃう!ドキドキトラブル♥フリージング, Hajikechau! Dokidoki Toraburu♥Furījingu), as well as other bonus material. The anime is licensed in North America by Funimation Entertainment for simulcasting (in its 16:9 censored format prior to the Elite subscription) on their video portal, Funimation later gained additional licensing rights to the series, and released the series on August 28, 2012, on DVD and Blu-ray. A second anime season, titled Freezing Vibration (フリージング ヴァイブレーション), premiered on October 4, 2013, with a promotional video being featured at the 2013 Anime Contents Expo and the show's official website. Funimation simulcasted Vibration on their website.

The opening theme for the series is "Color" by MARiA, a cover of a song that was originally sung by the Vocaloid Hatsune Miku, while the ending theme is "To Protect You" (君を守りたい, Kimi o Mamoritai) by Aika Kobayashi, who was making her performing debut. A CD single containing the two songs was released by Media Factory on February 23, 2011. For the second season, the opening theme is "Avenge World" and the ending theme is "The World Embraces Scars" (世界は疵を抱きしめる, Sekai wa Kizu o Dakishimeru), both are performed by Konomi Suzuki.

=== Internet ===
An internet radio show called Izumi Kitta and Aya Uchida of Freezing: West Middlefield Genetics Academy!! (橘田いずみと内田彩のフリージング ウエストミドルフィールド ゼネティックス学園分校!!) aired six episodes on HiBiKi Radio Station between December 10, 2010, and May 13, 2011. The show is hosted by Izumi Kitta and Aya Uchida, the respective voices for Cleo Brand and Ticy Phenyl. Each radio episode features guest voices from the anime series. One of those interviews featured Kobayashi's first radio interview, which was notable since Uchida was interviewing a future Love Live! colleague – Uchida was already portraying Kotori Minami from μ's (School Idol Project) while Kobayashi went on to portray Yoshiko Tsushima from Aqours (Sunshine!!)

An internet video show called Freezing: Genetics TV (フリージング ゼネティックスTV, Furījingu Zenetikkusu Terebi) aired on Media Factory's official YouTube account. The show is hosted by Mamiko Noto and Kana Hanazawa, the respective voices of Satellizer el Bridget and Rana Linchen, and ran eight episodes from December 10, 2010, to March 10, 2011.

== Reception ==
The anime adaption of Freezing has received generally positive reviews. The series' animation, character development and soundtrack were frequently praised, though critics' thoughts on the series' plotline and sexualization was generally more mixed. Davey C. Jones of Active Anime lauded Freezing as a "fantastic series that is part sci-fi and a huge part twisted fan service", which, "despite all the gratuity, the story is solid and had heart". Additional praise was directed at the animation, vibrant characters (including the relationship between Kazuya and Satellizer), as well as the soundtrack, with Jones writing that "the anime was great ... it's sick, it's twisted, yet somehow also managed to be sweet at times." In a later review of Freezing: The Complete Series (which includes Vibration), Jones continued to praise the characters, storyline, and sexualization, writing that it "has the action, the gripping story and wonderful visuals it [Freezing] has come to be known for – Freezing will captivate you." Although some criticism was directed at the series' plot holes, the positive reception was echoed by Brian Auxier of Anime Herald, whom praised the strong visuals, noting that "scenes burst with color as heroines speed through the air. The animation is clean, and the overall sense of speed is exhilarating." The Funimation English dub was also commended as being fitting, with Auxier concluding that "the intense and sexually charged combat scenes are the real centerpiece of the series, and generally eclipse the major faults in storytelling. Fans of action and fan service need to look no farther than Freezing. This one's definitely for you." Sequential Tart too opined that the series was highly enjoyable, praising the "exciting" story, breadth of characters, and the action scenes, with "the battles [being] as exciting as they are bloody", for a rating of 8 out of 10.

Theron Martin of Anime News Network gave the series a B− overall, stating "As is, the series is nowhere near as bad as its premise suggested it could have been, and comes off a little better in the end than the initial impression it gives, but its appeal is still not going to extend much beyond the normal crowd of fan service and graphic action aficionados." The writing quality and character development was critiqued as varied, though praise was directed at the visuals. Freezing ranked 14th on a list of "36 Titillating Ecchi Anime That Won't Let You Down" by anime website GoBoiano. Martin earlier gave Freezing a score of 3.5 out of 5 in his preview of 2011 winter anime, finding the artwork and animation to be very good at times though sometimes inconsistent; however, he opined that "any of the series' other potential weaknesses aren't going to matter if you have a sweet spot for the fan service/violence combo, though, as on that front it scores big-time." Carl Kimlinger, also of Anime News Network, complained that the mixture of the "serious" premise and storyline coupled with the gratuitous sexualization was "uncomfortable at best; disturbing at worst", and attacked the "creative bankruptcy, interminable explication, lazy characterization" of the series. Ultimately, a score of 1.5 was given. Carlo Santos too gave Freezing a score of 1.5, finding it to feel "like the brainchild of that one person you knew in high school [who wrote a] Big Epic Space Adventure that no publisher would be dumb enough to accept because it was too unwieldy and confusing ... Except that in Japan, someone actually did accept that Big Epic Space Adventure. And made an unwieldy, confusing anime out of it."

Freezing: Vibration also received generally positive critical reception. Anime News Network's Theron Martin noted that "the content follows through well enough that this is looking like a largely satisfying follow-up to the original" for a final score of 3 out of 5. Chris Beveridge of The Fandom Post commended the audio and storytelling capability of Vibration, and particular praise was directed at the humanity and relatability of the characters, including Elizabeth's character and Satellizer's backstory, with Beveridge finding the series to not be afraid of "screwing with" its cast. Vibration was summarized as "solid ... across the board and it's definitely a great second act to the story of Freezing", with a content grade of A−. Sequential Tart rated Vibration an 8 out of 10, critiquing the "deeper and darker" direction of the plot (especially Satellizer's past relationship with her brother Louis), new characters, and storyline, finding the enjoyability of the second season to be "equally as well as the first, though in different ways. It has great characters and an interesting story."
