= Crossdressing Pandemic =

Japanese manga series

- Volume 1 cover, depicting (left to right) Ryou, Nanaki, and Hikaru

女装パンデミック (Josō Pandemikku)
- Manga
- Written by: Mikuzu Shinagawa
- Published by: Kill Time Communication
- Imprint: Valkyrie Comics
- Magazine: Comic Valkyrie
- Original run: August 13, 2019 – July 12, 2021
- Volumes: 2

Crossdressing Pandemic, known in Japan as Josou Pandemic (Japanese: 女装パンデミック, Hepburn: Josō Pandemikku), is a Japanese manga series by Mikuzu Shinagawa. Kill Time Communication serialized it in their web magazine Comic Valkyrie from August 13, 2019, to July 12, 2021, and collected it across two tankōbon volumes in 2020–2021. It follows Nanaki Koga, a young man who wakes up from a two-year coma to learn that cross-dressing has become very popular among men while he was unconscious, and that the students and teachers in his all-male school now dress like women.

Shinagawa wrote the series with a focus on what he considered the major points of appeal in cross-dressing stories, including Nanaki's motivation for starting to wear women's clothes, how it turns habitual, and his behavior while dressed up. The series was among the most popular in the magazine during its serialization and sold well digitally, and was well received for its characters.

== Synopsis ==
Crossdressing Pandemic follows Nanaki Koga, who falls into a coma following an accident and remains unconscious for two years. After waking up, he learns that cross-dressing has become highly popular among men worldwide in the past two years, to the point where the vast majority of students and teachers at his all-male school wear women's clothes, as do an estimated 90% of young men in general. Because of this environment of feminine fashion, Nanaki learns to present himself like a woman to fit in, and is helped by his experienced friend Hikaru.

=== Characters ===
- Nanaki Koga (古賀ナナキ, Koga Nanaki) is a young man who is puzzled by the popularity of cross-dressing but ends up wearing women's clothes with Hikaru's help.
- Hikaru Watakashi (綿樫ヒカル, Watakashi Hikaru) is a childhood friend of Nanaki's, who already is used to cross-dressing and helps Nanaki with it.
- Ryou Sonogami (園上リョウ, Sonogami Ryou) is one of Nanaki's classmates, who Nanaki finds beautiful.

== Production and release ==
Crossdressing Pandemic was written and illustrated by Mikuzu Shinagawa, and was serialized by Kill Time Communication in Japanese in their digital magazine Comic Valkyrie from August 13, 2019 to July 12, 2021. Kill Time Communication also collects the chapters in tankōbon print volumes, which they publish under their Valkyrie Comics imprint, starting with the first volume on July 31, 2020; certain retailers included a number of art prints with the first volume, featuring characters from the series. In October 2020, versions of the opening chapters with added voice acting were released in the form of videos, in a collaboration with the VTuber agency Nijisanji: Nanaki was played by Yuki Chihiro, Ryou by Rindou Mikoto, Hikaru by Suzuki Masaru, and another cross-dressing character by Yuka Hiyamizu.

Shinagawa, who also has created other manga about male-to-female cross-dressing, described his writing process for Crossdressing Pandemic as involving a focus on what the reasons are behind why the male main character ends up dressing up like a woman for the first time; on the process of how the cross-dressing ends up becoming a habit for him; and on the way he behaves while wearing women's clothes. Shinagawa thought that these aspects, and the ways in which they can vary between characters, were the main points of appeal of stories about cross-dressing, and described them as what he personally enjoyed reading about in cross-dressing stories. He described the premise of Crossdressing Pandemic as cute, albeit not particularly deep. Funbo, another creator of cross-dressing manga, contributed a guest page for the second volume.

=== Volumes ===
No.	Release date	ISBN
1	July 31, 2020	978-4-7992-1393-3
Chapter 1–10: "Pandemic 01–10"; "Omake" ("Bonus")
2	August 10, 2021	978-4-7992-1530-2
Chapter 11–20: "Pandemic 11–20"

== Reception ==
Crossdressing Pandemic was by July 2020 among the most popular manga serialized in Comic Valkyrie, and topped the weekly comics rankings on DLsite, one of the largest digital distributors in Japan, in August the same year; conversely, neither of the physical print volumes debuted on the weekly Oricon charts for the top 30 highest selling Japanese comic book sales. Excite News liked the series' cast and recommended it to readers who like stories about cross-dressing male characters. Utako Suzuka of Nijisanji recommended the series for its characters and its combination of a pop art style and erotic elements, and said that it made her want to visit the manga's setting.
