= Lim Dall-young =

South Korean writer (born 1977)

- 임달영
- Born: June 14, 1977 (age 48); Seoul, South Korea
- Other names: Moonzero, Shigahaku
- Occupations: Novelist, manhwa/manga artist, Comic writer
- Known for: Unbalance Unbalance, Zero, Freezing, Black God
- Website: Official blog (in Korean); Artlim Media website (in Korean)

- Lim Dall-young
- Hangul: 임달영
- Hanja: 林達永
- RR: Im Dalyeong
- MR: Im Taryŏng

Lim Dall-young (born June 14, 1977) is a South Korean writer known for scripting the manhwa Unbalance Unbalance and the Korean–Japanese manga Black God and Freezing. He is the founder of Artlim Media, which was established in 1999.

== Works ==
=== Manhwa ===
- Zero: The Gate of Beginning (with Park Sung-woo) (2001–2004)
- Unbalance ×2 (with Soo-Hyun Lee) (2005–2011)
- Zero: Circle of Flow (Version 1) (with Sang-Young Roh) (2005–on hiatus)
- Zero: Circle of Flow (Version 2) (with Sang-Young Roh) (2006–on hiatus)
- Aflame Inferno (with Kwang-Hyun Kim) (2006–on hiatus)
- The Legend of Maian (with Soo-Cheol Jeong) (2007–on hiatus)
- The Phantom King (with Jae-Ho Yoon) (2009–2013)
- Unbalance ×3 (with Soo-Hyun Lee) (2015–on hiatus)
- Re:BIRTH 2: The Life Taker (with Soo-Hyun Lee) (2015–2016)
- Seokeuljeroui Isegye Yongjasaeop (with Lunar Phase & Hyein Bak) (2017–2018)
- Yaghyonjaneun Donggeojung (with Soo-Hyun Lee) (2017–2019)
- Unbalance x2: After Story (with Soo-Hyun Lee) (2018–2019)
- Sajangnimeun Iutsachon (with Won-Yong Sim) (2018–2019)
- Seokeuljeroui Isegye Yongjasaeop :Re (with Lunar Phase & Yujeong) (2020–on hiatus)

=== Manga ===
- Black God (with Park Sung-woo) (2004–2012)
- Onihime VS (with Soo-Hyun Lee) (2007–2012)
- Freezing (with Kwang-Hyun Kim) (2007–on hiatus)
- Re:Birth – The Lunatic Taker (with Soo-Hyun Lee) (2009–2011)
- Koimoku (with Hae-Won Lee) (2011–2012)
- Freezing: First Chronicle (with Jae-Ho Yoon) (2011–2012)
- Sai:Taker – Futari no Artemis (with Soo-Hyun Lee) (2012–2013)
- Freezing: Zero (with Soo-Cheol Jeong) (2012–2015)
- Ace Maid (with Hae-Won Lee) (2013–2014)
- Freezing: Pair Love Stories (with So-Hee Kim) (2013–2014)
- Ark Romancer (with So-Hee Kim) (2014–2015)
- Monochrome - Teito Ninpouchou (2015–2016)
- A Clumsy Goddess's Whole New Universe (with Kwang-Hyun Kim) (2019–2021)
- JK kara Yarinaosu Silver Plan (with hye-seong Lee) (2019–2024)
- JK kara Yarinaosu Silver Plan: Akuyaku Reijou-hen (2021–2022)
- Drawing: Saikyou Mangaka wa Oekaki Skill de Isekai Musou Suru! (with Kwang-Hyun Kim) (2021–present)

=== Light novels ===
- Zero: The Root (2000–2002)
- Zero: Perfect Dimension (with Kwang-Hyun Kim) (2007–2009)
- The Phantom King (with Soo-Hyun Lee) (2007–on hiatus)

=== Novels ===
- Legios (1995)
- Antithese (1998)
- The Legend of Maian (2000)
- March (2001)
- Third-Year Highschool Love (2001)

=== Video games ===
- Zero: Circle of Flow (2000)
- Scarred Gem (2001)
- Aoi Namida (Blue Tears) (2003)

=== Dōjinshi (under pen name Moonzero) ===
- Cross Make (with CDPA) (2008–present)

=== Artbooks ===
- Lim Extra Works (2011)
