= Comic Valkyrie =

Japanese manga magazine

- September 2008 issue of Comic Valkyrie
- Categories: Seinen manga
- Frequency: Bimonthly (formerly monthly from May 2011 to September 2011)
- Publisher: Kill Time Communication
- First issue: July 25, 2006
- Final issue: September 27, 2012
- Country: Japan
- Language: Japanese
- Website: Official website

Comic Valkyrie (コミックヴァルキリー, Komikku Varukirī) is a Japanese science fiction and fantasy seinen manga magazine published by Kill Time Communication. Its target readership is males between their teens and thirties. The first volume was released on July 25, 2006, and ran in bimonthly volumes until it switched to monthly publication, starting with Volume 30 on May 27, 2011. However, it switched back to bimonthly serialization following the release of Volume 34 on September 27, 2011. The final issue (Volume 40) was published on September 27, 2012, before it switched to a free, online-only publication on its website with full volumes and chapters available on Nico Nico Douga's online book service, Nico Nico Seiga. The digital publication ended with its final issue being published on December 15, 2025, with all currently serialized titles at the time being transferred to the KimiComi website.

At the time it was launched, it was described by Anime News Network as a "bishōjo battle magazine," reflecting the large proportion of stories featuring attractive young women engaged in adventure or combat in futuristic or young adult fantasy settings. Many manga serialized in Comic Valkyrie are later published in bound volumes under Kill Time Communication's Valkyrie Comics imprint. The magazine was published in B5 format and sold every other month on the twenty-seventh for 650 yen.

== Serialized titles ==
=== Current titles (online) ===
- Dream Hunter Rem Alternative (Seiji Okuda & Hiura R)
- Freezing (Dall-Young Lim & Kwang-Hyun Kim)
- Freezing Pair Love Stories
- Freezing: Zero (Dall-Young Lim & Soo-Cheol Jeong)
- Gaia Kitan (Toshimasa Komiya)
- How to Build a Dungeon: Book of the Demon King (Warau Yakan & Komiya Toshimasa)
- Infinite Blade (KEN+)
- Kada Gaiden (Umio Sai)
- Necrophile of Darkside Sister (Akira Kuzumiya)
- Sister Bullet (Matsuzaki Yutaka)
- Tatakau Onna no Ko-tachi (Katsuma Takazuki)
- Wrestle! The Under Ground (Buredo)
- Ziggurat (Miss Black)
- Tadokoro-san (Tatsubon)
- Management of a Novice Alchemist (Mizuho Itsuki & kirero)

=== Past titles ===
- Mugen Senshi Valis (ZOL)
- The Phantom King (Dall-Young Lim & Soo-Hyun Lee)
- Onihime VS (Dall-Young Lim & Soo-Hyun Lee)
- Yankano! (Yanagihara Mitsuki)
- Enma no Hanayome to Kimetsukerareta Fukou na Ore no Jinsei Keikaku (Sakuya Yūki)
- Koimoku (Dall-Young Lim & Hae-Won Lee)
- Freezing: First Chronicle (Dall-Young Lim and Jae-Ho Yoon)
- Unbalance Unbalance (Dall-Young Lim & Soo-Hyun Lee)
- GUNNER QUEEN (R-Ex)
- Dual Soul One Body (Hiroshi Kajiyama)
- Kite Liberator (Riku Omiya)
- Princess Lover! (Ricotta & Yu Midorigi)
- Tentacle Princess (Kuroha)
- Rose × Marie (Shioji Urase)
- MikoTama (Rei Kusakabe)
- Nekomimi Gakuen Yorozuya (Yūki Kagura)
- Wrestle! Idol (Buredo)
- Susume! Kaijin Club (Noritaka Suzuki)
- Tarot Maiden Kisara (Robaa)
- BLANGEL (Yukito Watase)
- Endless Eden (Tateo Retsu)
- Zettai Fuhatsu Atomic Girl (Yukiji Nakayama)
- Mitsurugi Haruka KikiIppai! (Kadiba Ataru)
- Justice Research Group Serenade (Naoki Yokoyama)
- Crossdressing Pandemic (Mikuzu Shinagawa)
