= Zero (manhwa) =

Korean manhwa

Zero: The Gate of Beginning

제로: 시작의 관 RR: Jero: sijagui gwan MR: Chero: sijagŭi kwan
- Genre: science fiction
- Author: Lim Dall-young
- Illustrator: Park Sung-woo
- Publisher: (South Korea) Daewon C.I. (United States) Infinity Studios (France) Tokebi (Russia) Comics Factory
- Demographic: Seinen
- Original run: 2000–2005
- Volumes: 10

Zero (Korean: 제로: 시작의 관; lit. 'Zero: The Gate of Beginning') is a Korean manhwa written by Dall-Young Lim and illustrated by Park Sung-woo. Based on a popular series of Korean eroge of the same title. The manhwa was serialized into 69 chapters. The individual chapters were published into 10 bound volumes by Daiwon C.I. The manhwa is licensed in North America by Infinity Studios, in France by Tokebi and in Russia by Comics Factory. Infinity Studios announced its plans to Zero volume 4 onwards in Portable Document Format for e-book.

Its sequel, Zero: Circle of Flow is a Korean manhwa written by Dall-Young Lim. It is licensed in France by Panini Comics under its imprint, Génération Comics. Lim adapted the manhwa from an Eroge computer game.

== Plot ==
From Infinity Studios:

Having been born in a secret government laboratory that cultivated esper (Extrasensory Perception) powers with humans, Shuuichi and his two sisters, Sumire and Katsumi, are forced to endure a difficult life as test subjects until their escape. Years later, these siblings are still being sought after by unknown organizations that are after Shuuichi's powers as he is what they refer to as a "Zero Sample" with the ability to cause "Zero Shock".

== Characters ==
Shuuichi Asakawa

Born in 1965, he is the father of Katsumi and the lover of Sumire. He inherited his immense power from his father which was transmitted through the incestuous relation he had with his daughter. He is known to the Extrasensory Perception Control System (ECS) as "Zero-type Sample".

Sumire Asakawa

Born in 1961, An artificial life form created from the genes of Shuiichi's dead mother with the purpose of being a generator of SG capable espers. She was brought up believing that she was Shuiichi's sister. Although appearing very mannerful in front of others, she can show a different side of herself to Shuuichi akin to that of an angry child. .

Katsumi Asakawa

The daughter of Sumire and Shuuichi. Because of the belief that Sumire and Shuu are brother and sister they hide the fact that she is their daughter explaining her as being their youngest sister. They do this so that she will be able to live a normal life free of persecution. Being the daughter of Shuuichi this would make her a 3rd gen "zero sample" however her power is never seen other than the fact that she can pilot the "SG Armor"

Natsuko Ishihara

Born in 1958, she is currently the Senior Research Agent of Tokyo's ESC Division. She is in an affair with her director, Kenji. She shows a weakness to children and has an inability to lie. Her well-endowed body is subject to Kenji's lust.

Kenji Oshima

Born in 1943, he is currently the Branch Director of Tokyo's ESC Division. Although he is married with two children, he is in an affair with Natsuko. He is an expert marksman

Sendo Akira

A man who thought he could do what wanted because he had power. After being defeated by Shuu and spending time in a detention center he finally began to repent for his actions.

Sendo Ayaka

Older sister of Akira. After Shuuichi defeats her and her brother, she falls in love with Shuu, and even begins to date him.

M.O. Minatsuki Osei

A "control factor" created for Shuuichi's father. She claims to have spent most of her life in Osaka and has a kansai accent. Before the events of the second "Zero Shock" she and Shuuichi have relations and a child is conceived.

Kei Asukawa

Kei is the son of Shuuichi Asukawa and Minatsuki Osei. Only appearing in the epilogue chapter, Kei has the same abilities as Shuuchi and is a third generation Zero Sample

== Publication ==
In the bonus section of the end of the first volume, Dall-Young Lim talks about his difficulties in trying to adapt the manhwa, target at older teens, from its adult game.

== Sequel ==
In 2005, Dall young-lim created a sequel entitled Zero: The Circle of Flow
