= Ninja Nonsense =

2004 comedy manga and anime series

- Ninja Nonsense: The Legend of Shinobu
- Cover of volume 1 of Ninja Nonsense as published by MediaWorks, featuring Shinobu and Onsokumaru

ニニンがシノブ伝 (Ninin ga Shinobuden)
- Genre: Comedy
- Manga

Ninin Ga Shinobuden
- Written by: Ryoichi Koga
- Published by: MediaWorks
- English publisher: US: Infinity Studios
- Imprint: Dengeki Comics EX
- Magazine: Dengeki Daioh
- Original run: July 18, 2000 – January 21, 2006
- Volumes: 4
- Anime television series
- Directed by: Haruo Sotozaki (series director); Hitoyuki Matsui
- Written by: Ryunosuke Kingetsu
- Studio: Ufotable
- Licensed by: NA: Crunchyroll
- Original network: CBC
- English network: US: Funimation Channel, Anime Network, Anime Selects
- Original run: July 8, 2004 – September 23, 2004
- Episodes: 12 (24 segments)
- Manga

Ninin ga Shinobuden Plus
- Written by: Ryoichi Koga
- Published by: Kadokawa Corporation
- Magazine: Comic Newtype
- Original run: June 26, 2020 – present
- Volumes: 3
- icon

Ninja Nonsense: The Legend of Shinobu (ニニンがシノブ伝, Ninin ga Shinobuden), also known as 2×2 = Shinobuden, is a Japanese manga series written and illustrated by Ryoichi Koga. The series subtitle is "The Nonsense Kunoichi Fiction". The manga was serialized in MediaWorks' Dengeki Daioh magazine between August 2000 and March 2006; the chapters were later compiled into four tankōbon volumes. The manga was released in English in North America by Infinity Studios under the title Ninin ga Shinobuden. A 12-episode anime adaptation produced by Ufotable aired in Japan between July and September 2004. The anime has been released in North America by The Right Stuf International under the title Ninja Nonsense: The Legend of Shinobu. A sequel manga titled Ninin ga Shinobuden Plus began serialization on Kadokawa Corporation's Comic Newtype website in June 2020.

Ninja Nonsense is an absurdist comedy series which follows a young woman named Shinobu as she trains to become a ninja. However, the series does not only focus on ninja training, but also focuses on Shinobu's lifestyle and friends through a series of disjointed comedic plot lines. The series uses character designs that favor a soft and rounded look rather than the slender bishōjo style. The original title of the series is based on a pun. In the Japanese numerical system, ni is two, and shi is four. Ni (2) × ni (2) = shi (4), therefore Ni-ni-n ga Shi-nobuden.

== Plot ==
Ninja Nonsense is an absurdist comedy centering on Shinobu, a ninja apprentice, who is attempting to pass her ninja exams while Kaede, a normal schoolgirl, studies for her school exams. As a part of her exam, Shinobu is ordered to break into Kaede's room to steal her panties by her instructor, Onsokumaru. Shinobu, who despite her enthusiasm, possesses little if any actual ninja skill, believes herself to be invisible and 'sneaks' into Kaede's room. Since Shinobu is perfectly visible to Kaede, the mission does not go as planned. Despite all of this, Kaede takes pity on Shinobu and the two become close friends. Shinobu trains alongside other male ninjas who are identical in appearance, though one is known as Sasuke.

== Characters ==
Shinobu (忍)
Voiced by: Nana Mizuki (Japanese); Emily Blau (English)
The title character is a kind, hardworking, and dedicated, but naive ninja who is somewhat clumsy with complex tasks. She is usually charged with taking care of her dojo, because everyone else is too lazy. She usually wears a purple and pink ninja outfit, but sometimes wears other costumes. Her ambiguous relationship with Kaede, whom she describes as "more than a friend but less than a lover", ranges from admiration and idolization to romantic interest. Despite the influence of Onsokumaru, she remains fairly innocent.

Kaede Shiranui (不知火 楓, Shiranui Kaede)
Voiced by: Ayako Kawasumi (Japanese); Meredith Zeitlin, Zoe Martin (English)
Kaede is an ordinary high school student attending Shirazuchi High School, Shinobu's classmate and the straight man character of the series. She does not allow herself to be tormented and usually puts annoying people in their place. She is often shown making remarks about how Onsokumaru and the male ninja are annoying.

Onsokumaru (音速丸)
Voiced by: Norio Wakamoto (Japanese); Sean Schemmel (English)
Onsokumaru is a shape-shifting creature; his name roughly translates to "sonic speed ball". He is usually depicted as a round, yellow sphere with a face, variably with wings or arms, deep voice and a loud temperament. Often, when getting emotional, he will transform into an extremely muscular full human body. In spite of being such a bizarre creature, he is the leader of Shinobu's ninja clan. Onsokumaru is perverted, lecherous, messy, loud, a cheat and greedy. He imagines softcore pornographic fantasies about Shinobu and Kaede, either for his own personal pleasure or to enthrall or persuade the male ninja into helping him. On the other hand, he is often friendly and has a silly, playful side.

Miyabi (雅)
Voiced by: Rie Kugimiya (Japanese); Veronica Taylor (English)
Miyabi is Shinobu's younger sister who has chosen the field of "magical summoning" rather than ninjutsu. She mutally dislikes Onsokumaru and believes that her elder sister should switch fields and become a magical summoner like herself. Though just ten years old, she is something of a prodigy and is skilled enough to consistently defeat Onsokumaru when he gets on her nerves.

Sasuke (サスケ)
Voiced by: Tomokazu Seki (Japanese), David Wills (ep. 1–3), Jason Linder (ep. 4–12) (English)
Sasuke is the class president of the Igumi Ninja Academy. Sasuke is sometimes easy to spot, but he is one of the dozens of faceless male ninja in the series. These male ninja are seen in different outfits, but never without their masks. Onsokumaru and Shinobu seem able to tell them apart. They share many of Onsokumaru's traits, although they are more kindhearted and conscientious, attempting to act noble and wise. They often join in on Onsokumaru's perverted schemes, but have shown a distaste for certain levels he will go to. The ninja have even more than once joined together to punish Onsokumaru when he goes too far. They have a tendency to act with a hive mind, but are easily distracted and get little done. Sasuke and some of the other male ninja form the "Miyabi Fan Club".

== Media ==
=== Manga ===
The manga is written and illustrated by Ryoichi Koga. It was serialized in MediaWorks' shōnen manga magazine Dengeki Daioh between the August 2000 and March 2006 issues. The chapters were collected into four tankōbon volumes under the Dengeki Comics EX imprint between February 2002 and May 2006. The manga is released in English in North America under the title Ninin Ga Shinobuden by Infinity Studios, who released the volumes between May 2006 and April 2008. A sequel manga titled Ninin ga Shinobuden Plus began serialization on Kadokawa Corporation's Comic Newtype website on June 26, 2020. As of January 2024, the chapters have been collected into three tankōbon volumes.

=== Drama CDs ===
A drama CD based on the manga titled Ninpō Drama CD Ninin ga Shinobuden: Bloom was released in May 2003. Three more drama CDs were released between June and October 2004 alongside the anime and feature the same cast as the anime. Although most of the cast from the original drama CD was different, Norio Wakamoto was the only voice actor who retained his voice in the anime as Onsokumaru. A fifth drama CD was included as a bonus CD for the "fandisc" DVD released in Japan in 2005.

=== Anime ===
A 12-episode anime television series adaptation, produced by Ufotable and directed by Hitoyuki Matsui, aired between July 8 and September 23, 2004, on Chubu-Nippon Broadcasting in Japan. The anime's opening theme is "Shinobu Sanjō!" (シノブ参上!) by Kiyomi Kumano and the ending theme is "Kurukururin" (くるくるりん) by Kaoru. An insert song used in episode five is titled "Shinobu Ondo" (シノブ音頭) by Nana Mizuki. The English dub was produced by NYAV Post, with Marc Diraison and Michael Sinterniklaas as voice directors. It was released by Right Stuf in North America originally across four DVD volumes from July 25 to November 28, 2006, under their Nozomi Entertainment label. A DVD box set was released on December 7, 2007, and was re-released with bonus materials on June 8, 2010. A Blu-ray collection was released on January 2, 2018. In 2020, Frontier Works re-released the anime television series to celebrate the manga's 20th anniversary.

No.	Title	Original release date
1	"Ninja Trainee Shinobu"; Transliteration: "Minarai Ninja, Shinobu Kenzan no Maki" (Japanese: 見習い忍者、忍見参の巻)	July 8, 2004
1	"The Head Master Appears"; Transliteration: "Tōryō, Arawaru no Maki" (Japanese: 頭領、現るの巻)	July 8, 2004
While studying for final exams late at night in her bedroom, high school girl Kaede Shiranui is interrupted by ninja trainee Shinobu, who claims that her mission is to collect underwear from high school girls as ordered by her headmaster. Instead, Shinobu summons her instructor Onsokumaru, a yellow shape-shifting creature, for help completing the mission. Kaede ends up failing her final exams since she was unable to study. Later on, Kaede comes across Shinobu hanging from a tree branch. As a token of appreciation, Shinobu invites Kaede to the Valley of the Ninjas, home to the Igumi Ninja Academy and its dormitory manor. They are momentarily halted by Onsokumaru in the neck of the woods. After Shinobu and Kaede are greeted by the masked ninja gatekeeper Sasuke, Kaede realizes that the headmaster is Onsokumaru sporting a beard in disguise, though Shinobu is oblivious to this. Even though an outsider like Kaede is not permitted to leave the facility alive, Shinobu temporarily knocks out Onsokumaru, which causes him to regress into childlike behavior. After Shinobu reveals several scars all over her body due to her ninja training, she takes Kaede back home.
2	"Ninjas Elated Over Cherry Blossom Viewing"; Transliteration: "Ninja, Hanami de Ukareru no Maki" (Japanese: 忍者、花見で浮かれるの巻)	July 15, 2004
2	"Shinobu Goes on a Date with Kaede"; Transliteration: "Shinobu, Kaede to Dēto Suru no Maki" (Japanese: 忍、楓とデートするの巻)	July 15, 2004
Everyone at the manor is very excited for the upcoming cherry blossom viewing party. As it unfortunately begins to rain outside, Shinobu is struck by lightning, which singes her homemade rice balls into white dust. Although it is revealed that the white dust can cause various flowers to bloom, no one is able to create cherry blossoms out of the white dust. During an expedition at a lake, Onsokumaru finds himself about to be eaten by a crocodile. Shinobu tries to save Onsokumaru, but to no avail. Later on, Kaede invites Shinobu to go downtown on a shopping excursion in the midst of a crowd. Onsokumaru and Sasuke end up joining them, while Kaede's friend Midori also accompanies them. They all eat at a diner, where Onsokumaru and Sasuke fight over a steak. Shinobu's younger sister Miyabi shows up and pranks both Onsokumaru and Sasuke with her magical summoning technique by using charms. Onsokumaru attempts to attack Miyabi with his own magical summoning technique, but Sasuke manages to protect Miyabi by using throwing stars. Aside from the shopping excursion being a bust, Kaede now has to deal with Miyabi as the newest addition of bizarre characters in her bedroom.
3	"Onsokumaru Gets Angry"; Transliteration: "Onsokumaru, Okoru no Maki" (Japanese: 音速丸、怒るの巻)	July 22, 2004
3	"Shinobu Leaves the Manor"; Transliteration: "Shinobu, Ie o Deru no Maki" (Japanese: 忍、家を出るの巻)	July 22, 2004
Despite Shinobu's pleas, an angry Onsokumaru plans to get even with Miyabi after she easily defeats him. Sasuke convinces Onsokumaru to use the crocodile named Devil as a suit of armor in a battle against Miyabi, but this does not go as planned. Onsokumaru supposedly writes slander in Miyabi's school notebook. Shinobu, Kaede and Miyabi find Onsokumaru and his doppelganger in the same room. It is revealed that Onsokumaru created his doppelganger using a magical summoning technique. Onsokumaru and his doppelganger are evenly matched in a fight, but Onsokumaru surprisingly absorbs his doppelganger back into his body. Later on, Onsokumaru has a secret monthly meeting while Shinobu is away. While eavesdropping, Shinobu fears that she will be kicked out of the manor. Shinobu goes to Kaede at her house, where Kaede's mother Kaori Shiranui agrees to let Shinobu join the family. When Onsokumaru, Sasuke and the other ninja barge into Kaede's bedroom and demand that Shinobu should return to the manor, it is revealed that the meeting was actually about pest control while Shinobu temporarily leaves the manor. Shinobu and Kaede bathe together, while Onsokumaru, Sasuke and the other ninja are tossed outside like garbage after attempting to join the girls in the bath.
4	"Ninjas Hate the Heat"; Transliteration: "Ninja, Atsugaru no Maki" (Japanese: 忍者、暑がるの巻)	July 29, 2004
4	"Miyabi in Love"; Transliteration: "Miyabi, Koi o Suru no Maki" (Japanese: 雅、恋をするの巻)	July 29, 2004
During a heat wave, Onsokumaru is surprised when Shinobu and Kaede wear swimsuits in a kiddie pool. At a secret river, Miyabi takes Shinobu and Kaede to change back into their swimsuits in an arbor, though Onsokumaru and Sasuke get distracted by beetles when they try to follow the girls. As they all return to the river, Onsokumaru gets irritated when he gets swept by the current. He creates a tidal wave, turning the river into a hot spring full of geysers. Later on, Shinobu, Onsokumaru and Sasuke learn that Miyabi is in love with a boy named Takeru. Onsokumaru brings Shinobu and Miyabi to a laboratory, but he guzzles down a love potion initially concocted for Miyabi to drink. Miyabi destroys the laboratory in retaliation after Onsokumaru temporarily falls in love with his own reflection. In the woods, Miyabi relentlessly attacks Onsokumaru and Sasuke when they confront Takeru, but she runs away in shame. Takeru catches up to Miyabi, and he honestly tells her how cool she was in the woods. It turns out that Takeru already has a girlfriend, much to Miyabi's frustration.
5	"Onsokumaru Goes to Hell"; Transliteration: "Onsokumaru, Jigoku ni Ochiru no Maki" (Japanese: 音速丸、地獄に落ちるの巻)	August 5, 2004
5	"Ninjas Host a Summer Festival"; Transliteration: "Ninja, Natsumatsuri o Okonau no Maki" (Japanese: 忍者、夏祭りを行うの巻)	August 5, 2004
After Shinobu and Kaede accuse Onsokumaru of being selfish, he makes snide remarks about going to Hell. Onsokumaru suddenly suffers a skull fracture from a falling metal washbowl. Finding himself in Hell, Onsokumaru is surprised when Shinobu appears as an angel staffer and Kaede appears as a judge named Lord Enma. According to Sasuke, Hell is a place where people who did evil deeds in life do their penance in the afterlife. Due to his selfish attitude, Onsokumaru manages to visit Heaven, where Miyabi and Devil shockingly appear as angels. After his rowdiness goes haywire, Onsokumaru suffers another skull fracture when Kaede bangs his head with her gavel. In the real world, it is revealed that Onsokumaru is still alive, though Shinobu embraces him too tightly. Later on, Onsokumaru suggests telling a ghost story on a hot summer night, much to Shinobu's fantasy. However, it ends up being about a life-size maid figurine, much to Kaede's chagrin. Instead, Onsokumaru suggests hosting a carnival. During the summer festival, Shinobu, Kaede and Miyabi notice that Onsokumaru is recklessly playing various carnival games, including the shooting gallery. After the Shinobu song is performed, the fireworks blast off in the sky.
6	"A Typhoon Arrives"; Transliteration: "Taifū ga Kita no Maki" (Japanese: 台風が来たの巻)	August 12, 2004
6	"The Ninjas Go Mushroom Picking"; Transliteration: "Ninja, Kinoko-garu no Maki" (Japanese: 忍者、きのこ狩るの巻)	August 12, 2004
When a typhoon arrives, Onsokumaru somehow finds his way to Kaede's house. A worried Shinobu soon arrives at Kaede's house, only to realize that Kaede already kicked out Onsokumaru. As the typhoon gets stronger, Shinobu stays the night at Kaede's house. Left in charge of cooking for Onsokumaru at the manor, Miyabi accidentally sprinkles gunpowder instead of pepper in her pot and causes it to explode. The next morning on a sunny day, Shinobu returns to the manor, falsely assuming that Onsokumaru and Sasuke had a candlelight party when they really had a terrible night. Later on, Onsokumaru and Sasuke prepare to go mushroom picking on a beautiful autumn day after learning that Shinobu, Kaede and Miyabi are already in the woods. Sasuke accidentally and Onsokumaru purposely start to hallucinate when they eat poisonous mushroom. Thankfully, the poisonous mushrooms are soon destroyed by Izumi, the headmaster of Rogumi Ninja Academy, who was Onsokumaru's former classmate and lover. The female ninja trainees of Rogumi practice with the male ninja trainees of Igumi. Kaede contemplates how Shinobu always seems to be so cheerful despite carrying the burden of being a ninja trainee.
7	"Onsokumaru Is Stuck"; Transliteration: "Onsokumaru, Kuttsuku no Maki" (Japanese: 音速丸、くっつくの巻)	August 19, 2004
7	"Shinobu Plays Ball"; Transliteration: "Shinobu, Purei Bōru no Maki" (Japanese: 忍、プレイボーるの巻)	August 19, 2004
Shinobu learns that Onsokumaru is stuck to Miyabi's sash. It is revealed that Miyabi tripped and fell on top of Onsokumaru about five minutes ago despite a weeklong synopsis. Sasuke gestures with his axe as he prepares to chop wood, causing Onsokumaru to fly into the atmosphere out of panic with Miyabi in tow. Onsokumaru and Miyabi soon descend into the pond at the manor, and they manage to fully separate and somewhat reconcile. Later on, Onsokumaru says that Shinobu and Kaede have no place in baseball, though Shinobu proves to be a worthy baseball pitcher. This turns into a battle of the sexes, with Onsokumaru and Sasuke versus Shinobu, Kaede, Miyabi and Izumi. After an intense first inning, Shinobu bats an incredible home run from Onsokumaru's screwball, causing the baseball to land in the fourth planet named Pacman from the second solar system named Bernard Star System, part of the Great Magellan Galaxy, which is 148,000 light years away from Earth. During the second inning, Onsokumaru cheats by duplicating his batted baseball into the outfield, though Miyabi duplicates her baseball glove and catches all the batted baseballs, thereby winning the overall game.
8	"Shinobu in Disguise"; Transliteration: "Shinobu, Bakeru no Maki" (Japanese: 忍、化けるの巻)	August 26, 2004
8	"A Monster Plant Goes Crazy"; Transliteration: "Kaishokubutsu, Abareru no Maki" (Japanese: 怪植物、暴れるの巻)	August 26, 2004
In Kaede's bedroom, Shinobu watches as Onsokumaru plans to pull a prank using Kaede's desktop computer and mouse. However, Kaede pulls a prank of her own by disguising herself with a monster mask, which is being used for a haunted house during an upcoming cultural festival at her school. An intrigued Shinobu wants to participate, resulting in an argument between Kaede and Onsokumaru over dressing up Shinobu as either a cat monster or an erotic imp. Although Kaede believes that Shinobu should be greeting outside the haunted house, Onsokumaru points out that Kaede might not have the stamina to endure the long hours inside the haunted house. After Shinobu trains Kaede to build up her stamina, Onsokumaru has a secret agenda inside the haunted house. Later on, Shinobu and Kaede witness Sasuke and Onsokumaru performing techniques while jumping over a plant. Shinobu then shows Kaede her own monster plant named Pochinosuke, which uses its pheromones to devour everything in its path including all the butterflies and birds. Pochinosuke goes crazy and ransacks the manor, but it has a change of heart when a crying Shinobu tells it to stop.
9	"The Girls Get Warm"; Transliteration: "Onna no Ko, Attamaru no Maki" (Japanese: 女の子、あったまるの巻)	September 2, 2004
9	"Kaede Gets Sick"; Transliteration: "Kaede, Kaze o Hiku no Maki" (Japanese: 楓、風邪を引くの巻)	September 2, 2004
After jumping into a bathtub full of cold bathwater, Onsokumaru is warmed up by Sasuke using blow dryers. With the idea of going to the hot spring, Onsokumaru and Sasuke urge to bathe with Shinobu, Kaede and Miyabi, but to no avail. As the girls get warm in their section of the hot spring, Onsokumaru is disappointed when a spying monkey turns out to be useless, yet he is shocked when Devil proves to be useful. After visiting random sections of the hot spring, Onsokumaru is catapulted towards the girls. He evades Miyabi's charms, but he is smacked by Shinobu's ponytail. Later on, a bedridden Kaede gets sick with a fever. While looking after Kaede, Shinobu plans to find an herb in the Fuji Forest that works well against fevers even though Onsokumaru already has the herb in his possession. Kaede recovers from her fever the next day, though Onsokumaru feigns illness and coerces Shinobu to fulfill his fantasies until Sasuke ruins the mood. At sunset, a bedridden Shinobu gets sick with the fever. Although Kaede looks after Shinobu, the former leaves when she is invited to sleep with the latter.
10	"The Ninjas Have Christmas"; Transliteration: "Ninja, Kurisumasu-ru no Maki" (Japanese: 忍者、クリスマスるの巻)	September 9, 2004
10	"The Ninjas Are Cursed"; Transliteration: "Ninja, Norowareru no Maki" (Japanese: 忍者、呪われるの巻)	September 9, 2004
Invited by Shinobu to a Christmas Eve party at the manor, Kaede plans to share her knowledge of what a party should be. Onsokumaru decorates an oversized poisonous mushroom as the Christmas tree and eats Kaede's two Christmas cakes. Exchanging gifts, Kaede gives Shinobu a scarf, while Shinobu gives Kaede a concealed sword. It begins to snow outside after Kaede tells Shinobu that a girl will have the best Christmas if she spends it with the one she loves. Later on, Onsokumaru sparks an argument with the chores given for the year-end housecleaning. Shinobu suddenly appears out of a pull-down wall from a secret passageway, which she previously found through a trapdoor. Miyabi explains that the secret passageways were used as an escape route filled with dangerous booby traps. Shinobu and Onsokumaru accidentally stumble upon a secret passageway through a swiveling wall. After encountering various booby traps, they find their way out in front of Kaede's house. Back at the manor, Shinobu opens a cursed box that Sasuke found in the attic. Onsokumaru and Miyabi soon discover that the cursed box is actually a congrats box since it contains various novelty items.
11	"The Legend of Sasuke Begins"; Transliteration: "Sasukeden, Hajimaru no Maki" (Japanese: サスケ伝、始まるの巻)	September 16, 2004
11	"The Grateful Ninja"; Transliteration: "Ninja, Ongaeshi Suru no Maki" (Japanese: 忍者、恩返しするの巻)	September 16, 2004
Sasuke oversleeps after dreaming of a fantasy involving Shinobu, Kaede, Miyabi, Izumi and Kaori, though this ends with Sasuke being tortured by Onsokumaru. Two trolls named Sodom and Gomorrah encounter Miyabi outside the manor. As a way to maintain his status as the class president, Sasuke picks a fight with Sodom and Gomorrah, using cheap tricks in order to defeat them. However, it turns out that the trolls were just looking for their lost baseball. Shinobu is then appointed as the new class president. Later on, Kaede and Kaori get a surprise visit from Shinobu, Onsokumaru and Sasuke on New Year's Day. Shinobu invites Kaede to participate in a theater contest held at the academy. This is loosely based on The Grateful Crane, which depicts a grateful crane who returns the favor to a girl who released him from a hunter's trap. After telling an adaptation of the story, an irritated Onsokumaru puts orange slices on the sleeping faces of Shinobu, Kaede and Sasuke. Onsokumaru is suddenly slapped in the face by Kaori, who scolds him for wasting fruit, though they reconcile soon afterwards.
12	"Onsokumaru's Secret"; Transliteration: "Onsokumaru no Himitsu no Maki" (Japanese: 音速丸の秘密の巻)	September 23, 2004
12	"Farewell Ninja Nonsense (2x2=Shinobuden)"; Transliteration: "Saraba Ninin ga Shinobuden no Maki" (Japanese: さらばニニンがシノブ伝の巻)	September 23, 2004
As springtime arrives, Kaede leaves the house in order to shop for a gift. Sasuke confronts Onsokumaru concerning his secret. Afterwards, Sasuke theorizes that Shinobu is actually a magical girl. Shinobu delivers a letter concerning a notice of the graduation exam. After joking about Shinobu being his younger sister, Onsokumaru reveals that he is Shinobu's headmaster, though Shinobu does not believe him. Furthermore, Shinobu will become an exchange student in England if she passes her graduation exam. Kaede overhears this news as she approaches the manor. Later on, Kaede, Miyabi and Sasuke encourage Shinobu to pass her graduation exam. All ninjas from various ninja academies assemble at the graduation exam hall. While having second thoughts, Shinobu is cheered on by Kaede at the sidelines. This gives Shinobu the confidence to take her graduation exam, testing her wisdom, strength and luck inside a cave of trials before a final battle against Onsokumaru. A few days later, Kaede recounts her farewell to Shinobu at the airport. Instead, Shinobu did not perform well as an exchange student and was consequently kicked out of the school. Kaede embraces Shinobu after the latter asks for the former's help in reporting the matter to Onsokumaru.

== Reception ==
The anime series of Ninja Nonsense has received generally favorable reviews since its release by Right Stuf Inc. in North America. Positive reception has been given regarding its gag style comedy, the animation, and the cast of characters. T.H.E.M Anime rated the anime 4 out of 5 stars, saying that "Ninja Nonsense is hardly highbrow stuff, but it's clever enough to be amusing and just up the alley of those who want a good gag-laden comedy." Carl Kimlinger, from Anime News Network, praised the anime for its varied animation styles as well as its quality, stating that, "The only constants are that, no matter what style of animation used, no matter how distorted or wild the art, it is always appropriate to the joke or mood of the moment." Furthermore, Kimlinger also credited the characters for their dynamic nature, however advised that marathoning the series can be difficult due to its pacing. In his review on The Fandom Post, Chris Beveridge credited the series for the twists it made to its episodic plots that would be cliche in its "slice of life" genre, highlighting funny moments from certain episodes, including the final episode, calling it "...a very satisfying close." Paul Jensen wrote that the show had a "narrow focus on absurd screwball humor, but did it very well" in his review for Anime News Network. Jensen also called the English dub noteworthy and praised Sean Schemmel's take on Onsokumaru.
