= Zero: Circle of Flow =

Korean manga

Zero: The Circle of Flow

제로 - 흐름의 원 RR: Jero - heureumui won MR: Chero - hŭrŭmŭi wŏn
- Author: Lim Dall-young
- Illustrator: ROH Sang-Young
- Publisher: (South Korea) Daewon C.I.
- Magazine: Planet Manhwa
- Original run: 2005 – ongoing
- Collected volumes: 3

Zero: the Circle of Flow (Korean: 제로 - 흐름의 원) is a Korean manhwa written by Dall-Young Lim and illustrated by ROH Sang-young. It is the sequel to Zero: The Gate of the Beginning and a direct adaption of the Korean eroge of the same name. It features different main characters and setting from its prequel, with a few of the original characters returning.

== Plot ==
Gi Yuh is a juvenile delinquent who leads a gang of students in his high school. After suffering a coma to save a girl from a car accident, he wakes up with strange powers that allow him to take possession of dying people.

== Characters ==
Yu-Gi

The protagonist of the story. Yu-gi is the Jjang of his high school and it is made apparent that he has ESPer abilities. it is said by many of the characters in the story that he possesses dangerous abilities and should not be left alive. Yu-Gi and his sister Young-Shi make a short appearance at the end of Zero: The Gate of The Beginning.

Young-Shi

Yu-Gi's younger sister. She seems to have incestuous feelings for him.

Irie

Yu-Gi's next door neighbor and the focus of his affection. In the past Yu-Gi did something to her that made her hate him. Irie is childhood friends with Yu-Gi and Young-Shi.

Ha-Na

A rich girl with the ability to locate people with special abilities. She was saved from being hit by a truck by Yu-Gi and instantly fell in love with him. She later explains to Estel that Yu-Gi's very existence goes against the grain of the universe.

Estel

A German-Korean teacher who teaches at Yu-Gi's school. She and Yu-Gi are on friendly terms (as far as Korean teachers and students go).
