= Iono-sama Fanatics =

Japanese manga series

- Iono-sama Fanatics volume 1 cover.

いおの様ファナティクス (Iono-sama Fanatikusu)
- Genre: Harem, romantic comedy, yuri
- Manga
- Written by: Miyabi Fujieda
- Published by: MediaWorks
- English publisher: NA: Infinity Studios (former)
- Magazine: Dengeki Teioh
- Original run: April 26, 2004 – November 26, 2006
- Volumes: 2

Iono-sama Fanatics (いおの様ファナティクス, Iono-sama Fanatikusu; translated by the author as Iono the Fanatics) is a Japanese manga series written and illustrated by Miyabi Fujieda. The manga was serialized between the first and last issues of the now-defunct Dengeki Teioh, a special edition version of Dengeki Daioh, from April 26, 2004, until November 26, 2006, and was published by MediaWorks. The series contains twelve chapters released in two bound volumes originally published under MediaWorks Dengeki Comics EX label. The manga has been licensed for English language distribution by Infinity Studios. The first volume in English was published on June 15, 2007, but the series was canceled before volume two was released.

== Plot ==
The series is about Iono, the queen of a small European kingdom with a fetish for black-haired women, who comes to Japan to recruit "sobame" (側女), which can mean both "lady-in-waiting" and "concubine" in Japanese.
