= Infinity Studios =

American publishing company

Infinity Studios was an American publisher of Japanese manga and Korean manhwa, publishing such series as Iono-sama Fanatics and Unbalance Unbalance.

== Manhwa and manga distributed by Infinity Studios ==
- Animal Paradise (manhwa)
- Bambi (manhwa)
- Blood Alone
- Cafe Occult (manhwa)
- Chun Rhang Yhur Jhun (manhwa)
- Fighting!! Guidance (manhwa)
- Hurrah! Sailor
- Ichigeki Sacchu!! HoiHoi-san
- Iono-sama Fanatics
- A Kiss for my Prince (manhwa)
- Menacing Dog's (manga)
- Missing White Dragon (manhwa)
- Na Na Na Na
- Ninja Nonsense (Ninin Ga Shinobuden)
- NOW (manhwa)
- Popo Can
- Sweety (manhwa)
- Traveler of the Moon (manhwa)
- Unbalance Unbalance (manhwa)
- Witch Class (manhwa)
- Zero (manhwa)
- Zippy Ziggy (manhwa)
