= A Kiss for my Prince =

Graphic novel by Hee-Eun Kim

- Cover of the Infinity Studios edition of A Kiss To my Prince vol. 1 (2007), art by Kim Hee-eun

왕자님에게 Kiss를 Wangjanimege Kissreul
- Author: Kim Hee-eun
- English publisher: (United States) Infinity Studios
- Magazine: Mink
- Original run: 2006
- Collected volumes: 3

A Kiss for my Prince (Korean: 왕자님에게 Kiss를), also known as A Kiss to the Prince, is a manhwa by Kim Hee-eun that is published in the Korean monthly girls magazine Mink. The story tells of Sei-Ann, a former noble girl whose family falls on hard times, forcing her to work in a countess' kitchen. She decides to become a palace maid in order to marry a prince and make life easier for herself, but soon, she discovers that her name isn't just Sei-Ann. Also, the story of the former powerful family Antweif is stirring up the court, and the three princes uses all possible means to spill out the truth.

== Characters ==
Sei-Ann (Asurey Antoweif)

The main female protagonist. She was an orphan who was taken in by the Countess. Sei-Ann isn't her real name. When a prince comes to the castle of the Countess to attend a party, Sei-Ann comes up with the idea of marrying the Prince so she can leave her life of being a servant. She makes a deal with Shion, a young man who Sei-Ann thought was a servant. The deal is for her to get closer to Prince Joon.

Sei-Ann actually comes from the royal house called 'Antoweif'. The entire royal house of Antoweif was exterminated for treason against the king; Sei-Ann is the only one who survived the massacre, and consequently loses her memories prior to the Countess taking her in. Eventually, she regains her memories and reclaims her rightful place as the heiress of the Antoweif family, aided by Prince Joon. In chapter 20 after Sei-Ann proposes to Shion, the Queen comes with the guards to arrest Sei-Ann because of a fake marriage. After the audience with the King Sei-Ann gives the King the "Flame of the Sea" which she finds in the passageways. Sei-Ann is missing and Shion finds her. They confess their feelings for each other. In the extra chapter, Joon calls Sian "older brother" and Kira asks if it's okay that Joon is still madly in love with Sei-Ann and that Yu-jen hits on her constantly. Shion replies, "I don't care if it's Joon or Yu-jen, Sei-Ann's prince is me and me only".

Prince Shion

The real crown prince. At first he tries to help Sei-Ann get closer to Prince Joon but it turns out that the prince Sei-Ann was looking for was Shion. He orders Sei-Ann to spy on Joon although it is against her will. Shion, Yu-Jen, and Joon share the same father, but Yu-Jen and Joon have a different mother. Shion's mother, Adelle Morianne, is dead but Joon and Yu-Jen's mother, Lorraine Muirla, is alive. Shion develops feelings for Sei-Ann and gets jealous when she gets close with other guys. In truth, Shion has romantic feelings toward Sei-Ann, and agrees to marry her to protect her from the queen and her men, who have come to take Sei-Ann away as a traitor.

Side Note: In the setting of A Kiss for My Prince, traitors may only be absolved of their crimes if they marry someone from the royal house. Therefore, Prince Joon seeks to marry her to revive the Antoweif House.

Countess

A very wealthy noblewoman who took Sei-Ann in as an orphan. She desires to have Sei-Ann grow up as a normal girl and consequently has Sei-Ann do maid's work around the castle. However, it is revealed that she was very close with Sei-Ann's mother, the Countess Antoweif, and managed to keep herself out of the Antoweif Treason Plot in order to save Ashley (Sei-Ann). When Sei-Ann reclaims her place as the heiress, the new Countess Antoweif, the Countess attempts to stop the Queen from assassinating Sei-Ann by persuading the Queen that Sei-Ann is no longer plotting to overthrow the crown, but acting on the advice of Prince Joon (the Queen's oldest son).

Prince Joon

The Prince that Sei-Ann thought was a crowned prince. Sei-Ann tries to get him to like her and she soon finds out that the real crowned prince is Shion. He owns a bird and told Sei-Ann to take extreme care of it. He wears a pendant that has the symbol of the Royal House Antoweif on it. He said it belongs to someone precious to him. He once mistook Sei-Ann as another woman, maybe the one he was in love with, and once he realised it was not her, he was mean and spiteful towards her. Once Sei-Ann takes him up on what he says he apologises and invites her to join him, his brothers and a close friend on a ride to a palace where they used to play. Mentions an incident that has stopped them from going there.

Prince Joon used to be a close friend of Ellen, Sei-Ann's mother and the Countess Antoweif. Upon death, Ellen made Prince Joon promise to give her pendant with the family insignia (a sign of the owner's status as the head of the Antoweif family) to her daughter Ashley. Although Ashley was supposedly found dead of disease, the girl was a double that is common among noble families-and Joon eventually discovered that Sei-Ann is in fact Ashley.

Because of his promise, Joon loses the claim to the throne-something that he had been virtually guaranteed of due to his mother's high status prior to becoming queen. He seeks to revive the Antoweif house, marry Sei-Ann, and claim the title of Crown Prince. He reveals that the treason plot of the Antoweif house had actually been a plot against the power and prestige of the Antoweif House, which rivaled that of the Royal House itself. Prince Joon wants to marry Sei-ann, and Sei-ann doesn't agree to marry Prince Joon.

Prince Yu-Jen

The third prince and Prince Joon's younger brother. He can be feminine at times and at seeing Sei-Ann at first sight he kissed her on his own intentions. There are two children that live in his room; he is known as a gay male in the palace until he takes an interest in Sei-Ann, something that the ministers encourage for the prince. Yu-Jen acts as Sei-Ann's rescuer and silent guard, facilitated by his seemingly silly and carefree demeanor. Yu-Jen never takes a side in the plot, choosing to play the middle man between his two elder brothers. He acts in the best interests of Sei-Ann foremost, and then his brothers. He once claimed that he loves Sei-Ann even if she is not Ashley.

Rona

Sei-Ann's closest friend. Like Sei-Ann, she is also a maid in Beck-Ja's household. She wears round glasses and helps Sei-Ann periodically throughout the plot, frequently coming to Sei-Ann's aid by bringing one of the princes. In the later chapters, she became the personal maid of an influential noble named Kira instead of Sei-Ann.

Kira/Keira Lucheren

An influential noble, a particular friend of Prince Joon. Her influence is quite strong in the royal family that she can order all three princes to set aside their work to spend time with her. She also sees to Sei-Ann accompanying them on a horseback ride out in the country. It is said that she is a crown princess and is first introduced as a boy.

== Volume Details ==
There are three volumes published by Infinity Studios. The left side of the jacket cover of the book has an introduction by Hee Eun Kim and a Pin-Up poster came with the first volume. In Korea, the series has been concluded at five volumes.
