= Park Sung-woo (artist) =

South Korean comics artist (born 1972)

Park Sung-woo 박성우
- Born: July 7, 1972 (age 54)
- Area: Artist

Korean name
- Hangul: 박성우
- Hanja: 朴晟佑
- RR: Bak Seongu
- MR: Pak Sŏngu

Park Sung-woo (Korean: 박성우; born July 7, 1972) is a South Korean manhwa artist. He made his debut in 1993 in IQ Jump. His author name as a manhwa artist is REDICE.

== Works ==
- Anima Cal Livs
- Black God
- Chun Rhang Yul Jun
- Dark Striker
- Deja-vu
- Meteo Emblem
- NOW
- Peigenz
- Space☆Dandy
- Zero
