= Alice on Deadlines =

Japanese manga series

- Cover of Japanese volume 1

D線上のアリス (Dī Senjō no Arisu)
- Genre: Action, comedy, supernatural
- Manga
- Written by: Shiro Ihara
- Published by: Square Enix
- English publisher: NA: Yen Press
- Magazine: Monthly Gangan Wing
- Original run: 2004 – 2006
- Volumes: 4

Alice on Deadlines (Japanese: D線上のアリス, Hepburn: Dī Senjō no Arisu) is a Japanese manga series written and illustrated by Shiro Ihara. The manga was serialized in Square Enix's shōnen magazine, Gangan Wing. Square Enix released the manga's four tankōbon volumes between March 26, 2005, and May 27, 2006. It is licensed in North America by Yen Press, which released the four tankōbon volumes between November 2007 and November 2008.

== Characters ==
Lapan (ラパン, Rapan)
Lapan is a perverted Shinigami, literally translated as "Death God". Lapan is introduced as perverted, initially reading a porn magazine, and is severely disappointed when he must go to the human world as a skeleton as he will not be allowed to 'play' with a young female body like last time. However, due to a mishap, he instead possesses Alice's body instead of a skeleton.
Because he broke one of the principal laws of the shinigami realm, that no shinigami may go to the human realm in his/her true form, all of his memories were erased as punishment.
Alice (アリス, Arisu)
Alice is a sweet and attractive girl. She is always thinking about the well being of others. However, due to a mishap when Lapan came to the Human Realm, she ended up in the body arranged for him, a skeleton.
Umenosuke Tsurukame (鶴亀 梅之助, Tsurukame Umenosuke)
The third son of Tsurukame commercial affairs, he is introduced as a cocky, arrogant and self-centered person. He believed that being a shinigami meant being a god. However, through a turn of events that included Lapan saving him, Ume got in touch with his feminine side, and he developed a deep love for Lapan.
Yuu
Yuu, also transliterated as "You" or "Yoo", is introduced in the start of the manga as Lapan's superior. He is apathetic and seems to enjoy using weapons, such as guns. In a later part of the series, after he is sent after a Shibito known as "Mad Hatter", who has proclaimed himself the "Shibito King", he encounters Lapan, Ume, and a new friend of Lapan's (who, very much like Ume, expresses much attraction toward Lapan, though she is truly a girl, unlike Ume) named Somuria. Shortly afterward, the four go on a vacation to a beach and hot spring. When Somuria asks Yuu why he has not changed into a bathing suit, he states that he has no desire to "put on a girl's bathing suit and frolic around." Somuria then feigns being upset and says she had hoped that they could all play and then enjoy some cream anmitsu together, at which Yuu seems quite interested, asking her if anmitsu tastes good. Ume and Lapan then get the idea to use Yuu's desire to try the anmitsu to get him into a (very revealing) bathing suit and flaunt, stating that if he doesn't, he can't have any. This is the only time Yuu shows much emotion (namely embarrassment and desperation).

== Manga ==
Alice on Deadlines is written and illustrated by Shiro Ihara. The manga was serialized in Square Enix's shōnen magazine, Gangan Wing. Square Enix released the manga's four tankōbon volumes between March 26, 2005, and May 27, 2006. It is licensed in North America by Yen Press, which released the manga's four tankōbon volumes between November 2007 and November 2008.

No.	Original release date	Original ISBN	English release date	English ISBN
1	March 26, 2005	4-7575-1397-6	November 2007	978-0-7595-2351-7
1st Line: Alice and Shinigami; 2nd Line: Eyeball and Koneko-chan; 3rd Line: Honey and Prince; 4th Line: Ume and La-chin
2	August 27, 2005	4-7575-1511-1	March 2008	978-0-7595-2845-1
5th Line: Thieving Cat and the Black Butterfly; 6th Line: Puppets and Ume of the Past; 7th Line: Cherry Blossoms and Memories; 8th Line: Shibito King and a White Bride
3	February 25, 2006	4-7575-1637-1	July 2008	978-0-7595-2846-8
9th Line: Underground Battle and Yoo Chun the Destroyer
4	May 27, 2006	4-7575-1688-6	November 2008	978-0-7595-2847-5

== Reception ==
Jason Thompson's appendix to Manga: The Complete Guide criticises the manga for its "grotesque figures and flat artwork" which "make it more ugly than sexy, and the incoherent plot makes a disappointing stab at sentimentality at the end". ComicMix's Andrew Wheeler commends the first volume for being "quite funny, with art that's easy to follow and lots of visual interest (mostly of the nubile female kind, though there is some monster-fighting)". However, he also criticises the manga for being "offensive to a whole lot of people. (Mostly humorless people, but I guess they count, too)". The second volume is criticised by Wheeler for being "very much not politically correct – it's sophomoric and almost entirely focused on jokes about underwear." The third volume is criticised for having "lots and lots of self-referential fan service follows, with very little plot or purpose to connect it all." Wheeler's review of the fourth volume comments that "Alice on Deadlines ends just like a good shōjo series should, which is odd, because I would never have thought that was the audience for a story about a lecherous skeleton". Pop Culture Shock's Ken Haley comments that the manga's "art is kind of pretty, but that's about it, as the non-stop pervy humor wears thin after about ten pages". Pop Culture Shock's Phil Guie criticises manga artist Shiro Ihara for running "out of scenarios for his main characters and decided to just end it all with lots of flashy, occasionally incomprehensible violence". Mania.com's Gary Thompson criticises the manga for its "vapid at best, incomprehensible at worst" plot and that "character relationships change at the drop of a hat".
