= The Legend of Maian =

South Korean manhwa series

마이언 전기 RR: Maieon jeongi MR: Maiŏn chŏn'gi
- Genre: Action/adventure, romantic fantasy
- Author: Lim Dall-young
- Illustrator: Jeong Soo Cheol
- Publisher: (South Korea) Haksan Culture Company
- Magazine: Young Champ; Prequel: Chance
- Original run: 1998
- Collected volumes: 14

The Legend of Maian (Korean: 마이언 전기; lit. 'Mayan Chronicles') is an ongoing Korean manhwa created by Lim Dall-young and illustrated by Soo-Cheol Jeong based on a Korean web novel. The plot revolves around the story of Felix Maian, a weak and naive young man who unknowingly releases the powerful sorceress Felicia Rand Philistine.

The manhwa was first published in 1998. The prequel was first published by Haksan in 2007. Currently this manhwa has been serialized in fourteen tankōbon volumes with none so far being published outside Asia. The Legend of Maian was also licensed in Russian by Comics Factory.

== Setting ==
The Legend of Maian takes place in the fictional world of Shuria. In The Legend of Maian world, countries bid for power by using regular military means or by using jewsts (mages) or people that can use madra (magic). Of all the countries, the countries of Meningrad and Pennsylvania are the strongest. Each country is ruled by a king with its jewsts often having a high-ranking position. So far, only Meningrad and Pennsylvania are the only countries to be mentioned.

== Plot ==
In post modern human civilization, technology regresses back to middle age level. The powerful sorceress, Felicia Rand Philistine, once tried to take over the country of Shurian. In the wake of her terror and destruction, a man rebelled against her oppression and domination. The people called him Yongja Maian (Maian the Brave), and he was eventually able to seal away the evil sorceress.

A thousand years later Felix Maian has just probably made the biggest mistake of his life when he releases the sealed sorceress that his ancestors had tried so hard to imprison. Now he is charged with the task of trying to keep the sorceress from once again trying to take over the world. Her powers limited because of a personal seal, to remove, Felix must kiss Felicia.

== Release history ==
Volume 14 available on April 30, 2012.

As of now (08/13/2016), The Legend of Maian is on hiatus and it is unknown when the next volume will be released.
