= Ming Cult =

Fictional cult and martial arts sect

- Chinese: 明教
Transcriptions
Standard Mandarin
- Hanyu Pinyin: Míng Jiào
Yue: Cantonese
- Jyutping: Ming^{4} Gaau^{3}

Cult of Mani
- Chinese: 摩尼教
Transcriptions
Standard Mandarin
- Hanyu Pinyin: Móní Jiào
Yue: Cantonese
- Jyutping: Mo^{1}-Nei^{4} Gaau^{3}

Demonic Cult
- Chinese: 魔教
Transcriptions
Standard Mandarin
- Hanyu Pinyin: Mó Jiào
Yue: Cantonese
- Jyutping: Mo^{1} Gaau^{3}

The Ming Cult (明教) is a fictional cult and martial arts sect featured in the wuxia novel The Heaven Sword and Dragon Saber by Jin Yong, first published in serial form from 1961 to 1963. It is also briefly mentioned in The Legend of the Condor Heroes, another novel also by Jin Yong. It is loosely based on Manichaeism, an actual Gnostic religion which originated in Persia in the third century and later spread to other parts of the world, including China. The cult is based at Bright Peak (光明頂) in the Kunlun Mountains and has several branches spread throughout China. Its most powerful skills are the "Heaven and Earth Great Shift" (乾坤大挪移) and the "Martial Arts of the Holy Flame Tablets" (聖火令武功).

== Fictional history ==
In The Heaven Sword and Dragon Saber, the Ming Cult is also known as the "Cult of Mani" (摩尼教) or "Demonic Cult" (魔教) in the wulin (martial artists' community). The cult originated in Persia and spread to China in the seventh century.

The cult is highly secretive and conducts its activities out of sight of the rest of the wulin. Its founding principles also deviate largely from other martial arts sects. While other sects typically seek to become a leading sect in the wulin, the Ming Cult strongly adheres to its mission of "delivering humankind from suffering and eliminating evil". This is aptly summed up in a mantra repeated by its members:

"The blazing Holy Flame burns my withered body. Life is lamentable, but death is also painful. Only with the Brightness can we do good and exterminate evil. Joy and sorrow will all become dirt and dust eventually. Pity the people of my world! They face many hardships indeed! Pity the people of my world! They face many hardships indeed!"

Despite its poor reputation in the wulin, the cult is not "evil" or "demonic". Though it was welcomed during the Tang dynasty (618–907), it faced government persecution during the Song dynasty (960–1279) when people started spreading rumours about how it was a heretical or "unorthodox" cult corrupting the masses.

During the Yuan dynasty (1271–1368), the Ming Cult started a rebellion to overthrow the corrupt government and save the people. Yet, it receives no support from other martial arts sects, and instead faces hostility from them. Towards the end of the Yuan dynasty, the six leading "orthodox" sects in the wulin – Wudang, Shaolin, Emei, Kunlun, Kongtong, and Mount Hua – form an alliance to attack the cult at its base on Bright Peak in the Kunlun Mountains.

The Ming Cult's new leader, Zhang Wuji, fends off the attack and resolves the conflict, making the cult more open to the wulin for the first time. Through his efforts, the wulin's views of and attitudes towards the Ming Cult start to improve, and the wulin gradually shows support for the cult in resisting the corrupt government. Zhang Wuji eventually passes the leadership of the Ming Cult to Yang Xiao and retires from the wulin. Zhu Yuanzhang, a minor leader in the cult, betrays his fellows and unites all rebel factions in China under his control. He ultimately topples the Yuan dynasty, defeats his rivals such as Chen Youliang, and establishes the Ming dynasty.

== Organisation ==
The cult is headed by a leader referred to as the Cult Master (教主). The Left and Right Bright Emissaries (左右光明使) serve as the Cult Master's deputies. The cult also has four Guardian Kings (護教法王) who assist the Cult Master in overseeing the cult's activities. Ranked below the Guardian Kings are the five Banner Chiefs (Chinese: 旗主), with each banner named after one of the Five Elements (Earth, Fire, Water, Wood, and Metal). The cult members are divided among the five banners. The cult has branches spread throughout China often disguised as buildings such as inns and shops to avoid unwanted attention. The cult's base, called the General Altar (總壇), is based on Bright Peak (光明頂) in the Kunlun Mountains.

The Ming Cult's structure in Persia differs from the one in China. In Persia, the cult is led by a woman who is selected from three specially chosen virgins called Holy Maidens (聖女). There are twelve Guardian Kings (寶樹王) instead of four. The Three Emissaries (Wind, Cloud and Moon) are tasked with safekeeping the Holy Flame Tablets, the cult's most sacred artefacts, and they are also the most powerful fighters among the cult members in Persia.

== Heaven and Earth Great Shift ==
The "Heaven and Earth Great Shift" (乾坤大挪移) also translated into English as "Universal Grand Shift", is one of the Ming Cult's most powerful skills. It is also the signature skill of Zhang Wuji, the protagonist of The Heaven Sword and Dragon Saber. Zhang Wuji learns it after accidentally venturing into an area on Bright Peak forbidden to all cult members except the Cult Master, and finding the manual for the skill.

The "Heaven and Earth Great Shift" came from the Persian Ming Cult, and is the most powerful among all the martial arts originating from the Western Regions. It is a martial art passed down from generation to generation in the Ming Cult and only the Cult Master is qualified to learn it, even though Yang Xiao, the Bright Left Emissary partially mastered it.

The main purpose of the "Heaven and Earth Great Shift" is to reverse the two kinds of qi flowing in the practitioner's body, namely rigidity and softness, yin and yang, and the red colour of the cultivator's face indicates the sinking of blood and the transformation of true qi in the body.

== Heavenly Eagle Cult ==
The Heavenly Eagle Cult (天鷹教) was founded by one of the Ming Cult's Guardian Kings, "White Brows Eagle King" Yin Tianzheng. Yin had left the Ming Cult during its internal conflict and established his own sect. The Heavenly Eagle Cult does not follow the Ming Cult's original practices and customs, but its members are still morally upright in their ways. The Heavenly Eagle Cult is often regarded as a branch of the Ming Cult and deemed to be as equally "evil" and "unorthodox" in the wulin because of Yin's affiliation with the Ming Cult. The Heavenly Eagle Cult merges with the Ming Cult after Yin's maternal grandson, Zhang Wuji, becomes the new leader of the Ming Cult.

== Connection to historical Manichaeism ==
The names "Ming Jiao" (literally "Religion of Light") and "Moni Jiao" (literally "Religion of Mani") were used in China during the Song dynasty (960–1279) to describe the faith practised by Chinese adherents of Manichaeism such as the White Lotus Societies.
