= Glossary of anime and manga =

The following is a glossary of terms that are specific to anime and manga. Anime includes animated series, films, and videos, while manga includes graphic novels, drawings, and related artwork.

Note: Japanese words that are used in general (e.g. oniisan, kawaii, and senpai) are not included on this list, unless a description with a reference for notability can be provided that shows how they relate.

== Character traits ==
- ahoge (アホゲ, "foolish hair"): Refers to any noticeable strand of hair which sticks in a different direction from the rest of an anime/manga character's hair.
- bishōjo (美少女, "pretty girl"): Beautiful young woman.
- bishōnen (美少年, "beautiful boy"; sometimes abbreviated bishie): Japanese aesthetic concept of the ideally beautiful young man: androgynous, effeminate or gender-ambiguous. In Japan, it refers to youth with such characteristics, while in Europe and the Americas, it has become a generic term for attractively androgynous males of all ages.
- chūnibyō (中二病, lit. 'second-grade middle-schooler syndrome'): typically used to describe early teens who have delusions of grandeur and have convinced themselves they have hidden knowledge or secret powers.
- denpa (電波), also denpa-kei (電波系) or denpa-san (電波さん), is a Japanese term for individuals or persons who may feel disconnected from reality or dissociated from the people around them. They may entertain wild fantasies and persecutory delusions or other strong views, and their speech or actions may seem strange or incoherent to outside observers. The literal meaning of the term is "electromagnetic wave", and the original sense of denpa-kei and denpa-san was of someone who thought they were receiving voices, thoughts, or instructions directly to their mind via electromagnetic radiation.
- dojikko (ドジっ子): A cute girl who tends to be clumsy. They may make mistakes that hurt themselves or others. Dojikko character traits are often used for stock characters in anime and manga series.
- kemonomimi (獣耳, けものミミ, ケモノミミ, lit. "animal ears"): Characters with animal features such as ears and a tail, but a human body. One of the most common types is the catgirl.
- menhera (メンヘラ): A portmanteau of "mental health-er". The most common type is the menhera girls, who exhibit unstable emotionality, obsessive love, and stereotypical self-injurious behaviors such as wrist cutting.
- mukokuseki (無国籍, "statelessness" or "nationlessness"): A character with a purposefully ambiguous national or ethnic identity.
- otokonoko (男の娘, "male daughter" or "male girl"): a man who has a culturally feminine gender expression, which includes amongst others a feminine appearance, or cross-dressing.

=== Dere-dere traits ===
- -dere (デレ): any stock character, usually a female love interest, distinguished by "lovey dovey" or "lovestruck" behavior, which manifests in the particular way they interact with their love interest. An umbrella term for all words with the suffix, examples include:
  - dandere (ダンデレ): A character who is quiet and asocial. They are generally afraid to speak, fearing that what they say will get them in trouble. A portmanteau of deredere (でれでれ) with danmari (黙り), meaning "silence".
  - goudere (豪デレ): A character who relentlessly pursues their own vision of their love interest's desires, which they typically misunderstand in a comically over-the-top fashion. A portmanteau of deredere (でれでれ) with gou (豪), meaning "bold" or "unrestrained".
  - kuudere (クーデレ; also kūdere): A character who appears to not have emotions. They are often stoic and expressionless, and they remain calm in stressful situations, but may be hiding their true emotions. A portmanteau of deredere (でれでれ) with the Japanese pronunciation of cool (クール).
  - tsundere (ツンデレ): A character who is usually harsh, stern, cold or hostile to the person they like, while occasionally letting slip the warm and loving feelings hidden inside due to being shy, nervous, insecure or simply unable to help acting badly in front of the person they like. A portmanteau of deredere (でれでれ) with tsuntsun (ツンツン), meaning "stern" or "hostile".
  - yandere (ヤンデレ): A character who is initially loving and caring to someone they like a lot until their love and devotion becomes feisty and mentally destructive in nature through either overprotectiveness, violence, brutality or all three combined. Yandere are usually, but not always, female characters. A portmanteau of deredere (でれでれ) with yanderu (病んでる), meaning "(mentally or emotionally) ill".
  - guandere (グアンデレ): A character who expresses their love in unhygenic ways, love and devotion tends to dwindle later in the relationship. Guanderes are normally make characters, A portmanteau of deredere (デレデレ) with fuesiena (不衛生な).

== Demographics ==
- josei (女性, "woman"): Anime and manga intended for the adult female demographic.
- kodomo (子供) or kodomomuke (子供向け): Anime and manga for children.
- seinen (青年, "man"): Anime and manga intended for the adult male demographic.
- shōjo (少女, "young woman"): Anime and manga intended for the adolescent female demographic.
- shōnen (少年, "young man"): Anime and manga intended for the adolescent male demographic.

== Fandom ==
- aniparo (アニパロ): A slang term for the parodic use of anime characters by fans, a portmanteau of "anime" and "parody".
- Comiket (コミケット, Komiketto; "comics market"): One of the largest trade fairs for dōjinshi comics, held twice a year in Ariake, Tokyo.
- dōjinshi (同人誌): A fan-made or amateurly produced work such as a parody, fan fiction, or manga.
- fandub: Short for fan-made dub, describing a film or video in which fans have voiced over the dialogue.
- fansub: Short for fan-made subtitles, describing a film or video in which fans have translated and subtitled the dialogue into another language.
- fudanshi (腐男子, "rotten boy"): A male fan of yaoi.
- fujoshi (腐女子, "rotten girl"): A female fan of yaoi.
- nijikon (二次コン, "2D complex"): Appeared in the early 1980s and describes the perception that two-dimensional anime, manga, and light novel characters are more attractive visually, physically or emotionally than people from the real world, or that a person is solely sexually aroused by 2D characters.
- Odagiri effect: A phenomenon in which a piece of media, typically a television program, attracts a larger than expected female audience because it features attractive male actors or characters.
- otaku (おたく, オタク, ヲタク): The literal translation of the word is another person's house or family (お宅, otaku). In Japanese slang, otaku is mostly equivalent to "geek" or "nerd", but in a more derogatory manner than used in the West. In 1989, the word "otaku" was shunned in relation to anime and manga after Tsutomu Miyazaki (dubbed "The Otaku Murderer") brutally killed underage girls. Since then, the word has become less negative in Japan with more people identifying themselves as some type of an otaku.
- waifu (俺の嫁, ore no yome; lit. "my wife") / husbando (俺の婿, ore no muko; lit. "my husband") : A fictional character from non-live-action visual media (typically an anime, manga, or video game) to whom one is attracted or whom one considers their ideal significant other. Originated as a loanword in Japan during the 1980s before being re-appropriated as a slang term among English speakers in the 2000s; some online tabloids claim the latter stems from a scene in Azumanga Daioh in which the character Mr. Kimura uses the term to describe his own spouse.
- weeaboo (shortened to weeb): A derogatory internet slang term for an obnoxious fan of Japanese culture, originally a replacement word for "wapanese" (a contraction of "wannabe" Japanese or "white" Japanese).

== Genres ==
- bakunyū (爆乳, "enormous breasts"): A genre of pornographic media focusing on the depiction of women with large breasts.
- bara (薔薇, "rose"): A masculine gay men's culture and, in manga circles, a genre of manga about beefcakey gay men usually by gay men. Compare with the female-created Boys' Love. Also known as gay manga (ゲイ コミ, geikomi; "gay comics")
- boys' love (ボーイズラブ, bōizu rabu): Abbreviated "BL", male homosexual content generally aimed at women, currently in general use in Japan to cover yaoi and shōnen-ai.
- harem (ハーレムもの, hāremumono): A subgenre of anime and manga characterized by an ordinary guy surrounded by a group of women with some being potential love interests. An ordinary girl surrounded by guys is a reverse harem.
- isekai (異世界, "different world"): A subgenre of manga and anime in which characters are transported or reincarnated into an alternate world, often with a high fantasy setting.
- iyashikei (癒し系, "healing"): a sub-genre of slice of life, portraying characters living out peaceful lives in calming environments, which is intended to have a healing effect on the audience.
- lolicon (ロリコン, rorikon): Portmanteau for "lolita complex". A genre of manga and anime in which childlike female characters are depicted in an erotic manner.
- mecha (メカ, meka): anime and manga that feature robots (mecha) in battle. Series that feature mecha are divided into two subgenres: "super robots", where the mecha have unrealistic powers, and "real robots", where the mecha have more realistic powers and are generally more utilitarian.
- shōjo-ai (少女愛, "girls love"): Manga or anime that focus on romances between women.
- shōnen-ai (少年愛, "boys love"): A term denoting male homosexual content in women's media, although this usage is obsolete in Japan. English-speakers frequently use it for material without explicit sex, in anime, manga, and related fan fiction. In Japan, it denotes ephebophilia.
- guro: A genre of erotic art popular in hentai associated with extreme graphic violence, derived from the ero guro nansensu movement of the Shōwa era.
- ryona (リョナ), portmanteau: "ryōki" (猟奇; "seeking the bizarre"); "onanī" (オナニー; "masturbation"): a Japanese term for a sexual complex. This fetish revolves around a victim, almost exclusively a female, being physically assaulted or psychologically abused by an offender. It differs from sadism in that it is a voyeuristic fantasy fetish with focus towards fictional characters from video games, anime, manga, television and movies that include battering, abusing or otherwise killing women. In case the victim is male it is often labeled as gyaku-ryona (逆リョナ).
- shotacon (ショタコン, shotakon): Pormanteau for "Shōtarō Complex". A genre of manga and anime wherein childlike male characters are depicted in an erotic manner.
- yaoi (やおい): Anime or manga with a focus on homosexual male relationships and/or male-on-male sexual content; usually created by women for women.
- yuri (百合): Anime or manga with a focus on lesbian relationships. In Japan, the term denotes a broad spectrum of attraction between women. It is also used for sexually explicit content outside Japan, and is more explicit than shojo-ai.

== Other terms ==
- anime music video (AMV): Video clips from at least one anime series arranged to fit a musical piece playing in the background.
- CV: Character Voice, see Seiyu.
- dub: When the voices in an anime are translated into another language.
- eroge (エロゲー, erogē): An eroge, a portmanteau of erotic game (エロチックゲーム, erochikku gēmu), is a Japanese video or computer game that features erotic content, usually in the form of anime-style artwork. Eroge originated from galge that added adult content rated 18+.
- eyecatch (アイキャッチ, aikyatchi): A short scene or illustration used to begin and end a commercial break in a Japanese TV program, similar to commercial bumpers in the United States.
- fan service (ファンサービス, fan sābisu): Elements specifically included to sexually amuse (such as scantily-clad or naked males or females, or ecchi content) or titillate the audience, which may or may not be necessary to plot development.
- galge (ギャルゲー, gyarugē): This is a type of Japanese video game centered around interactions with attractive anime-style girls. These games are a subgenre of dating sims targeted towards a male audience.
- glomp: a form of aggressive hugging in which the active party dives or lunges at the passive party in the manner of a tackle, sometimes called a "tackle hug".
- gekiga (劇画, "dramatic pictures"): A term adopted by more serious Japanese cartoonists, who did not want their work to be associated with manga. It is akin to English speakers who prefer the term "graphic novel", as opposed to "comic book".
- gensakusha (原作者, "original author"): A term used by derivative works to credit the original creator of a series. It is also used to refer to the writer of a completely original manga, as opposed to its illustrator or mangaka.
- Hanahaki disease: A fictional disease that originated in shōjo manga before becoming a popular trope in slash fiction.
- henshin (変身, "transformation"): The action of a character transforming into a superhero form. Mostly used by the Kamen Riders in the Kamen Rider Series, this term ended being used for anything related to metamorphosis in manga, anime and tokusatsu, since Kamen Rider ended being mainly a tokusatsu series, despite its roots being the works of the manga artist Shotaro Ishinomori.
- hentai (変態, "pervert"): A term used outside of Japan to describe erotic or pornographic manga and anime. In Japan, terms such as "ero manga" and "ero anime" are used to describe the genre.
- juné (ジュネ): A manga or text story with male homosexual themes written for women in an aesthetic (耽美, tanbi) style, named so because of the Juné magazine.
- kabedon (壁ドン): When a person slaps or leans against the wall and the other person has nowhere to go. This has become popular as a "clever move of confession"
- lemon (レモン, remon): Derived from the hentai anthology series Cream Lemon (くりいむレモン, Kurīmu Remon), the term is used to refer to material with explicit sexual content.
- mangaka (漫画家, マンガ家): Manga artist. A creator of manga; this can refer to both the writer and illustrator of the work.
- mihiraki (見開き): A manga scene, usually one single image, spread to cover two opposing pages.
- name (ネーム, nēmu): A rough draft of a proposed manga. Also known as a manga storyboard.
- omake (おまけ, オマケ, "extra"): An add-on bonus to anime and manga, like a regular "extra" on western DVDs; or a bonus strip at the end of a manga chapter or volume.
- original net animation (ONA): An anime production intended to be distributed through the internet via streaming or direct download, as opposed to on TV or cinemas.
- otome game (乙女ゲーム, otome gēmu; lit. "maiden game"): A video game that is targeted towards a female market, where one of the main goals, besides the plot goal, is to develop a romantic relationship between the player character (a female) and one of several male characters.
- original video animation (OVA): A type of anime which is intended to be distributed on VHS tapes or DVDs and not shown in movies or on television. It is also less frequently referred to as original animated video (OAV). DVDs are sometimes known as Original Animated DVD (OAD).
- raw: Anime episode or manga scans in its original language without editing or subtitles.
- scanlation (also scanslation): The scanning, translation, and editing of comics from one language into another.
- seiyū (声優): A Japanese voice actor. As well as voicing characters in anime, seiyū do voicing for video games, radio shows, drama CDs, and other media.
- tobirae (扉絵, "door page"): Refers to the full-page illustration that marks the beginning of most manga chapters. Designed to capture the reader's attention, they sometimes spread to cover two opposing pages, and typically contain the series' title and the chapter's title. The equivalent in American comics is the splash page.
- yonkoma (4コマ漫画, "four cell manga"): Refers to manga drawn in a four-panel comic strip format.
- zettai ryōiki (絶対領域, "absolute territory"): Refers to the area of exposed thigh when a girl is wearing a short skirt and thigh-high socks. The ideal skirt:thigh:sock-above-knee ratio is often reported to be 4:1:2.5. Zettai ryōiki are often referred to by letter grades, where grade A is the ideal.

== See also ==
- Japanese fashion
- Japanese honorifics
- Japanese subcultures
- Manga iconography
- List of English words of Japanese origin
