= Twenty-Eight Famous Murders with Verse =

Series of muzan-e works

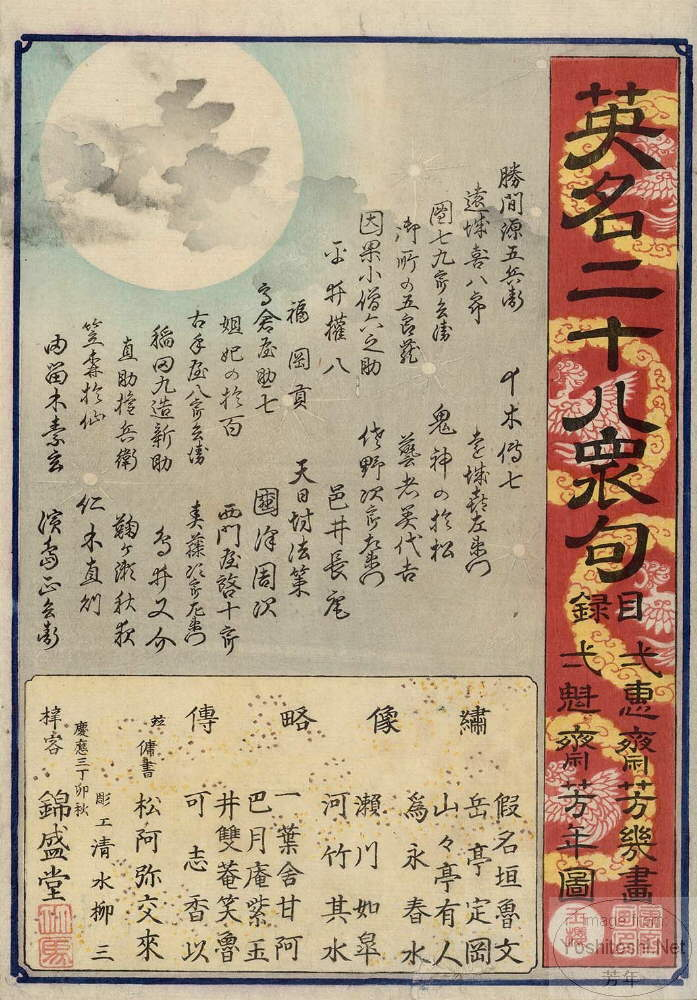
Title page of Twenty-Eight Famous Murders with Verse

Twenty-Eight Famous Murders with Verse (Japanese: 英名二十八衆句, Hepburn: eimei nijūhasshūku) is a series of ukiyo-e woodblock prints by Tsukioka Yoshitoshi and Utagawa Yoshiiku, with each artist creating 14 prints. It was published from 1866 to 1867 (Keiō 2 to Keio 3). Most of the works are based on acts of murder or torture based on historical events which were later depicted in kabuki and noh theatre. The series is considered a masterpiece and defining piece of the so-called "cruel pictures" (muzan-e) genre of ukiyo-e. The main title is inscribed in a red rectangular frame along with the subject of the painting, and on the left, in a white rectangular frame, are haiku supposedly by Matsuo Bashō, Ryota Oshima, Mukai Kyorai, and others. The series supposedly contains text from 10 different authors, although one author was listed twice. The term "eimei nijūhasshūku" is based on the Buddhist "Twenty-Eight Mansions", and the word "shūku" (衆句, "a collection of poems") is a pun on "shuku" (衆苦, meaning "mass suffering".) The series was published by Nishikimorido.

== Gallery ==
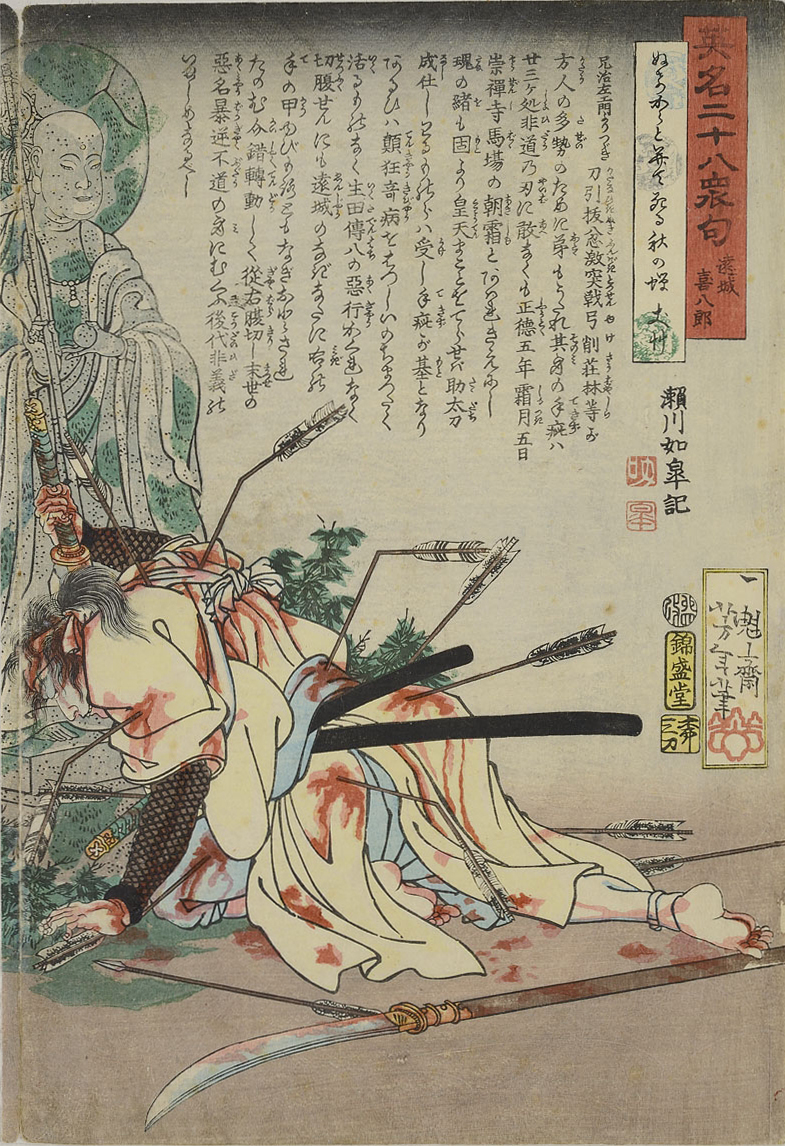
Enjō Kihachiro fallen at the foot of a statue

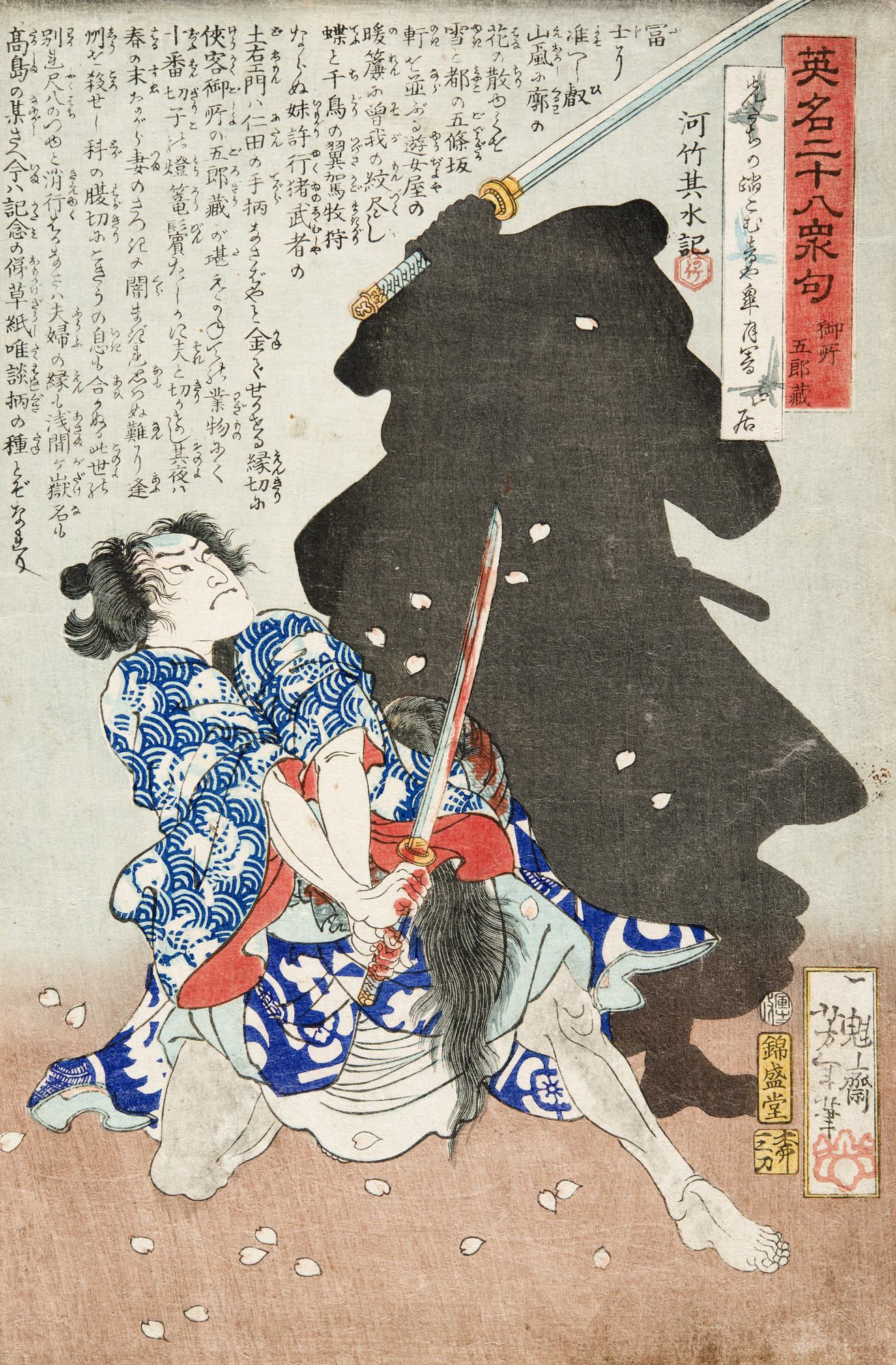
Gosho Gorozo battling a shadow

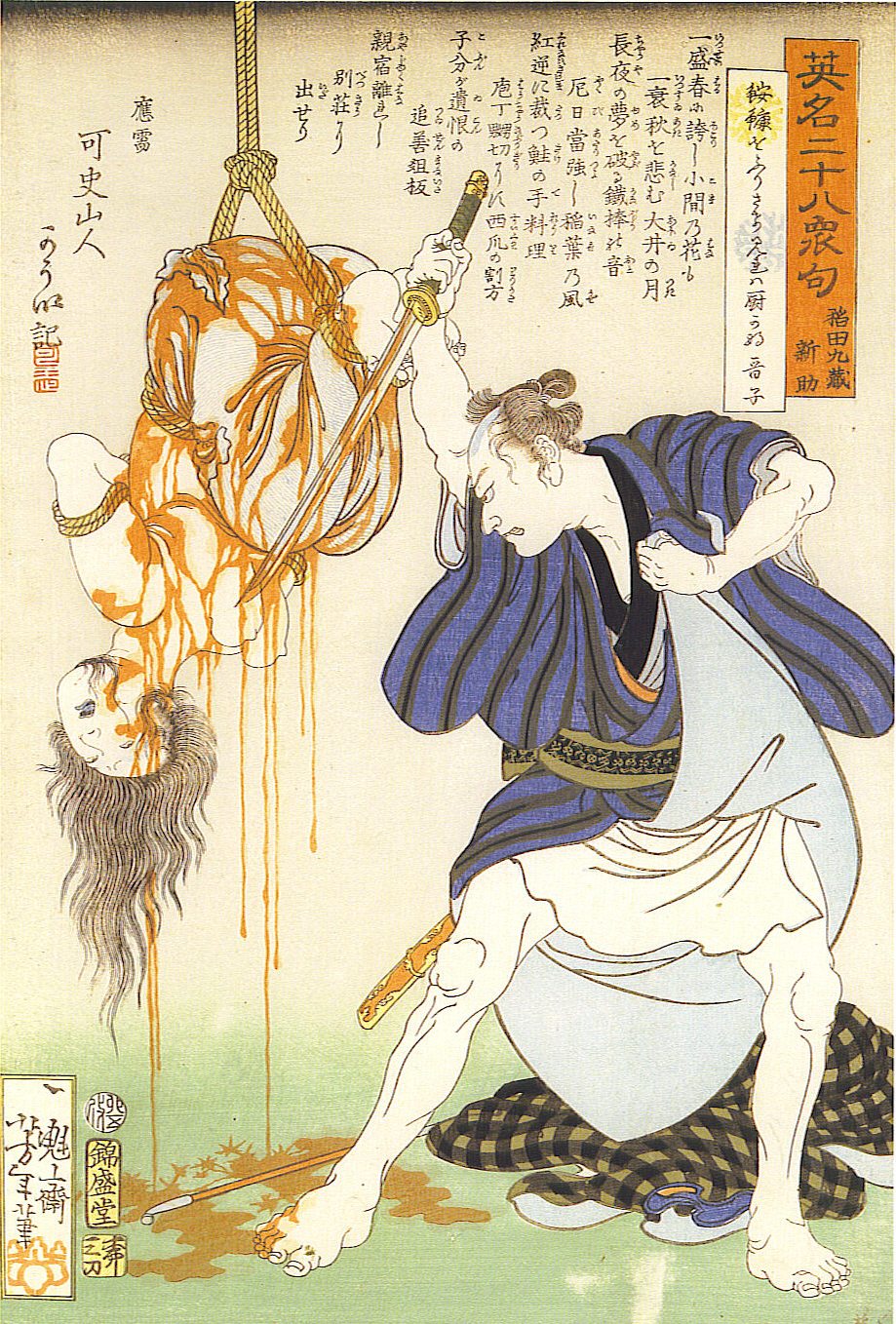
IInada Kyūzō Shinsuke: woman suspended from rope

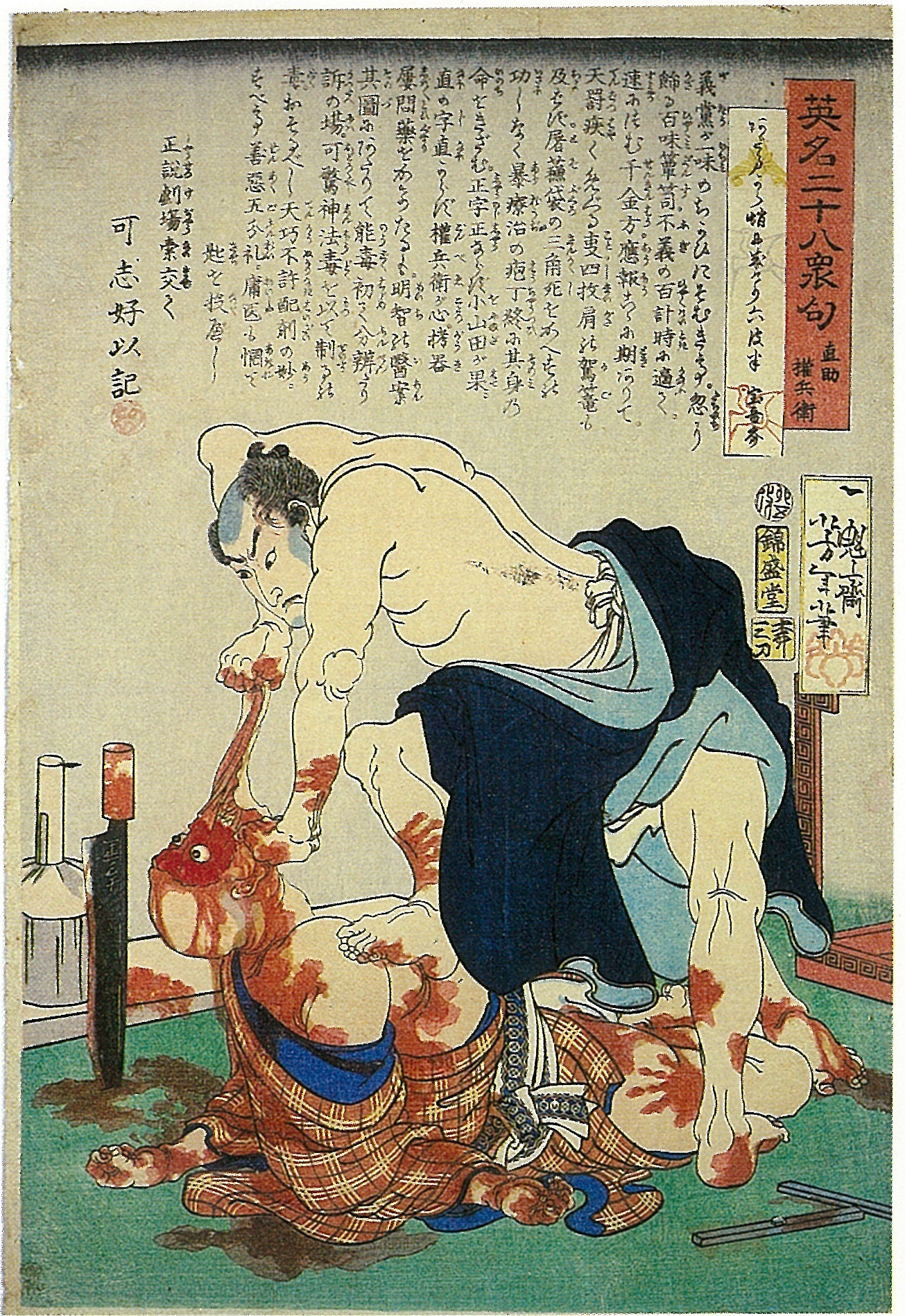
Naosuke Gombei ripping off a face

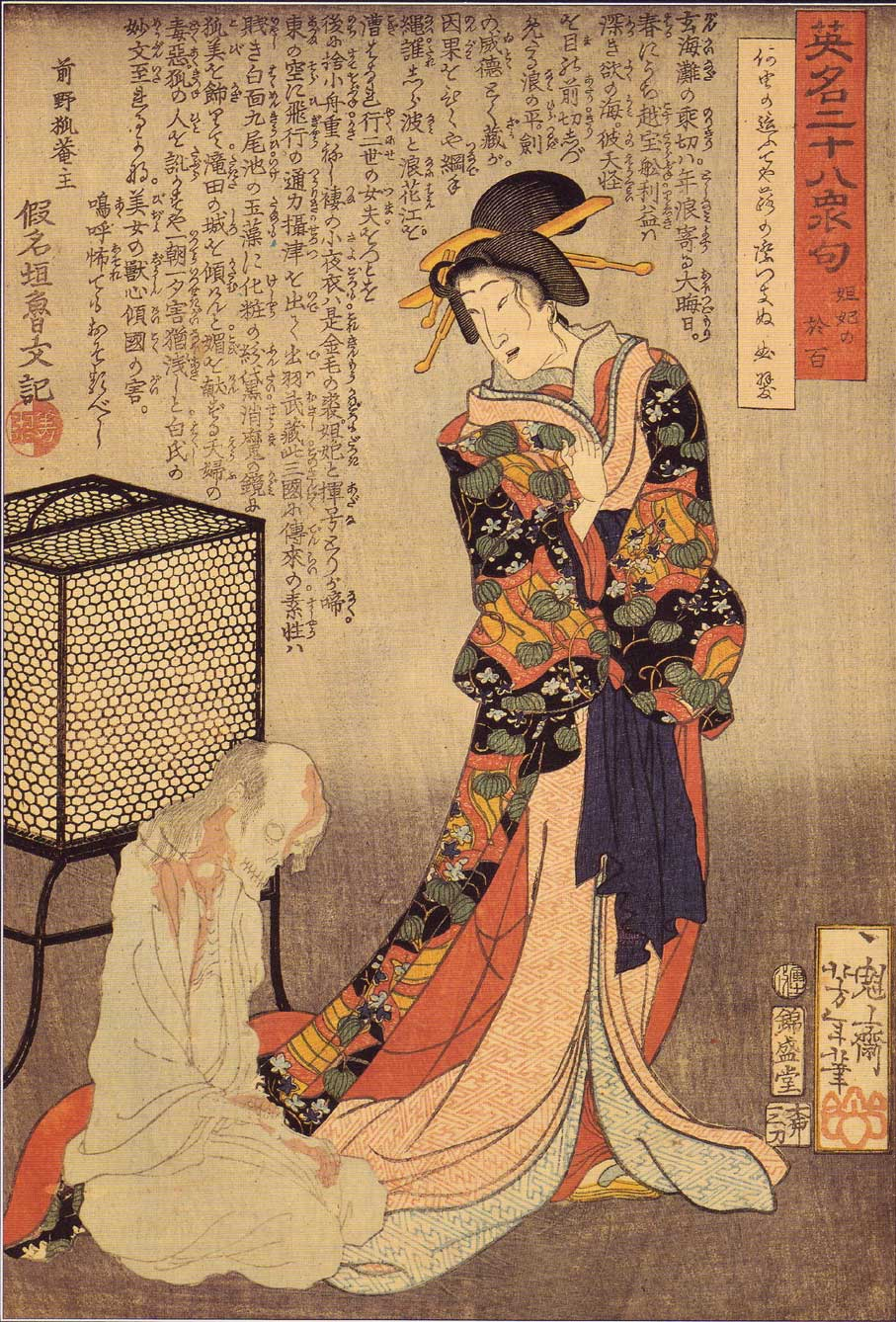
The prostitute Ohyaku and a seated ghost

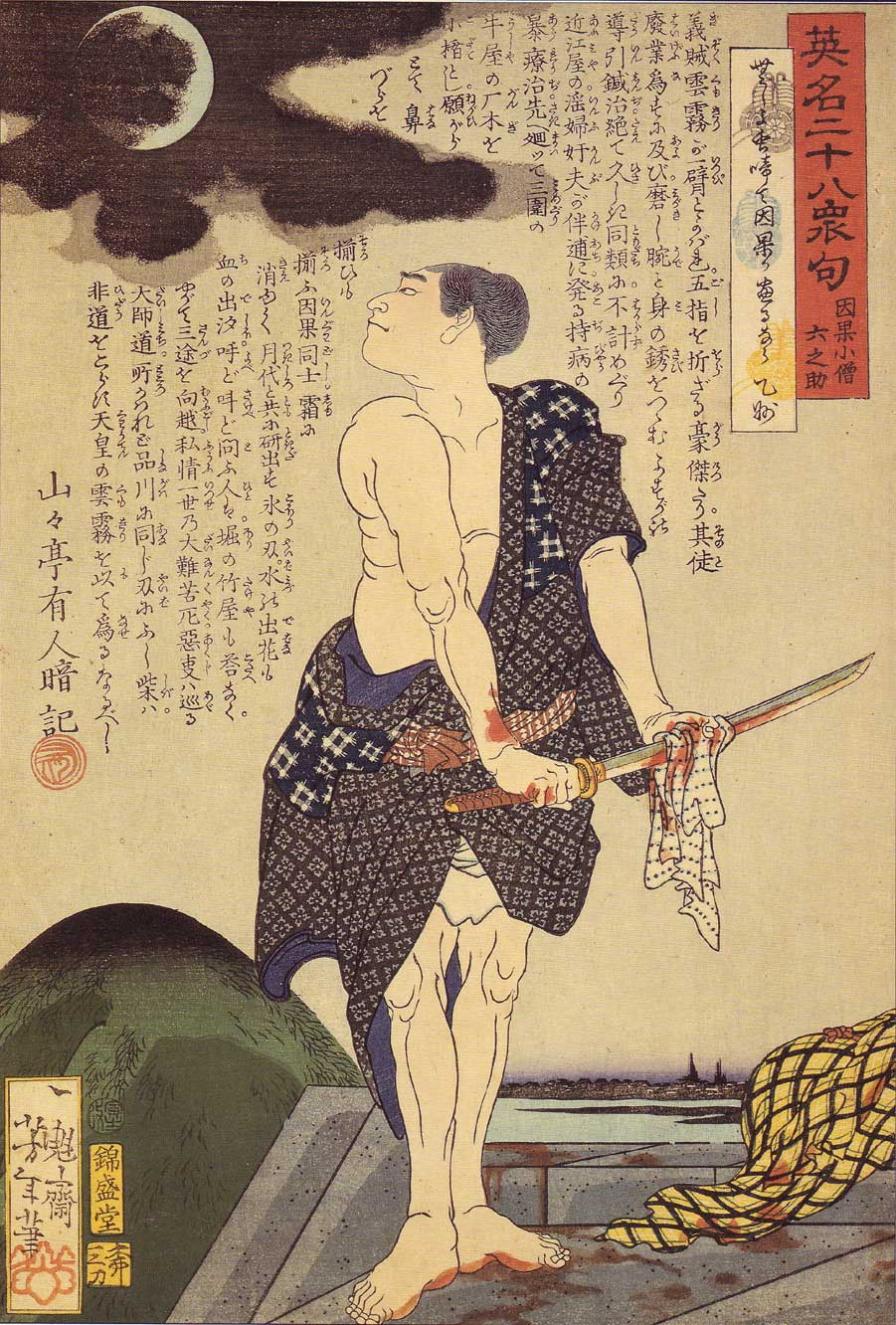
Inga Kozō Rokunosuke wiping his sword

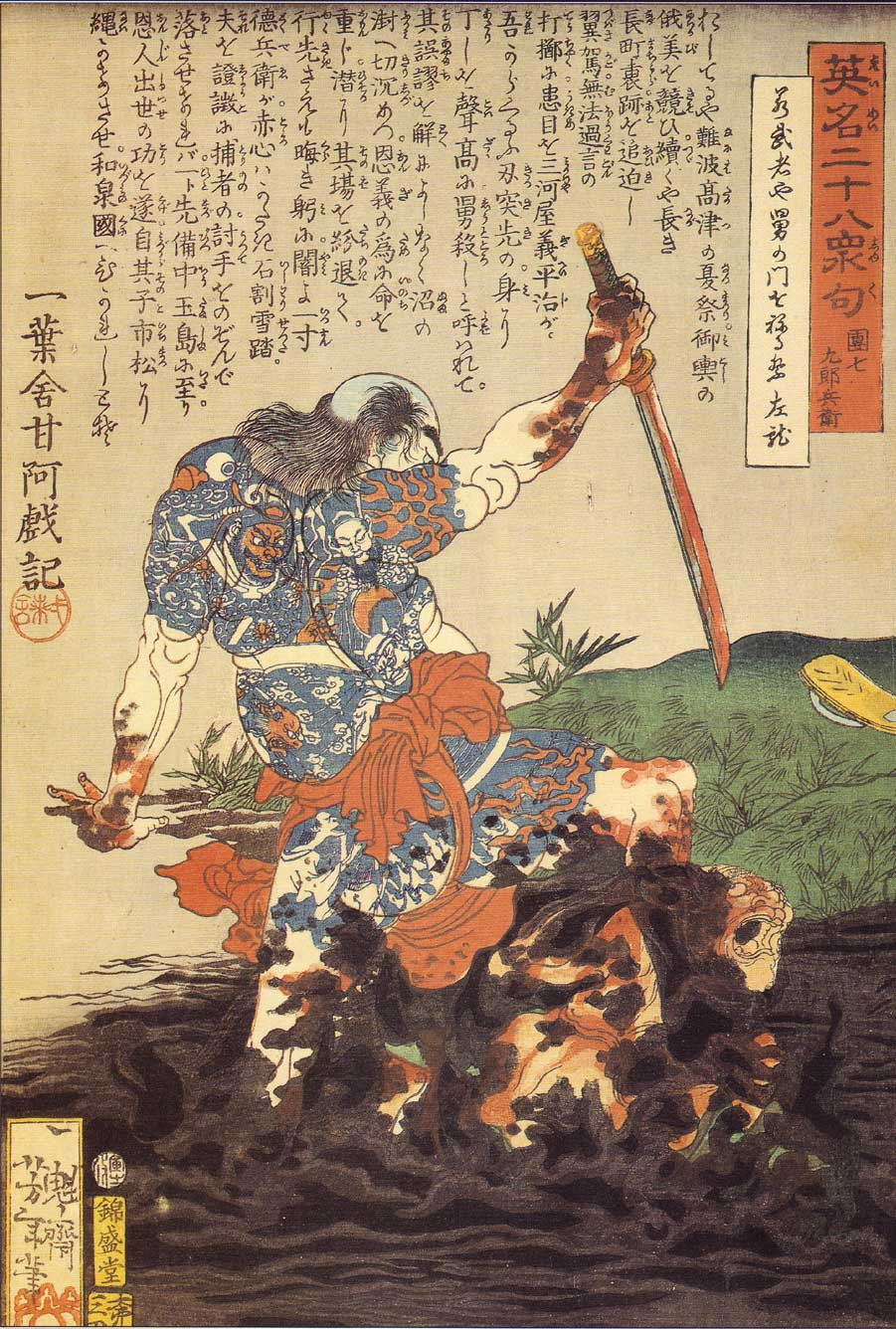
Danshichi Kurobei murdering the old man in the mud

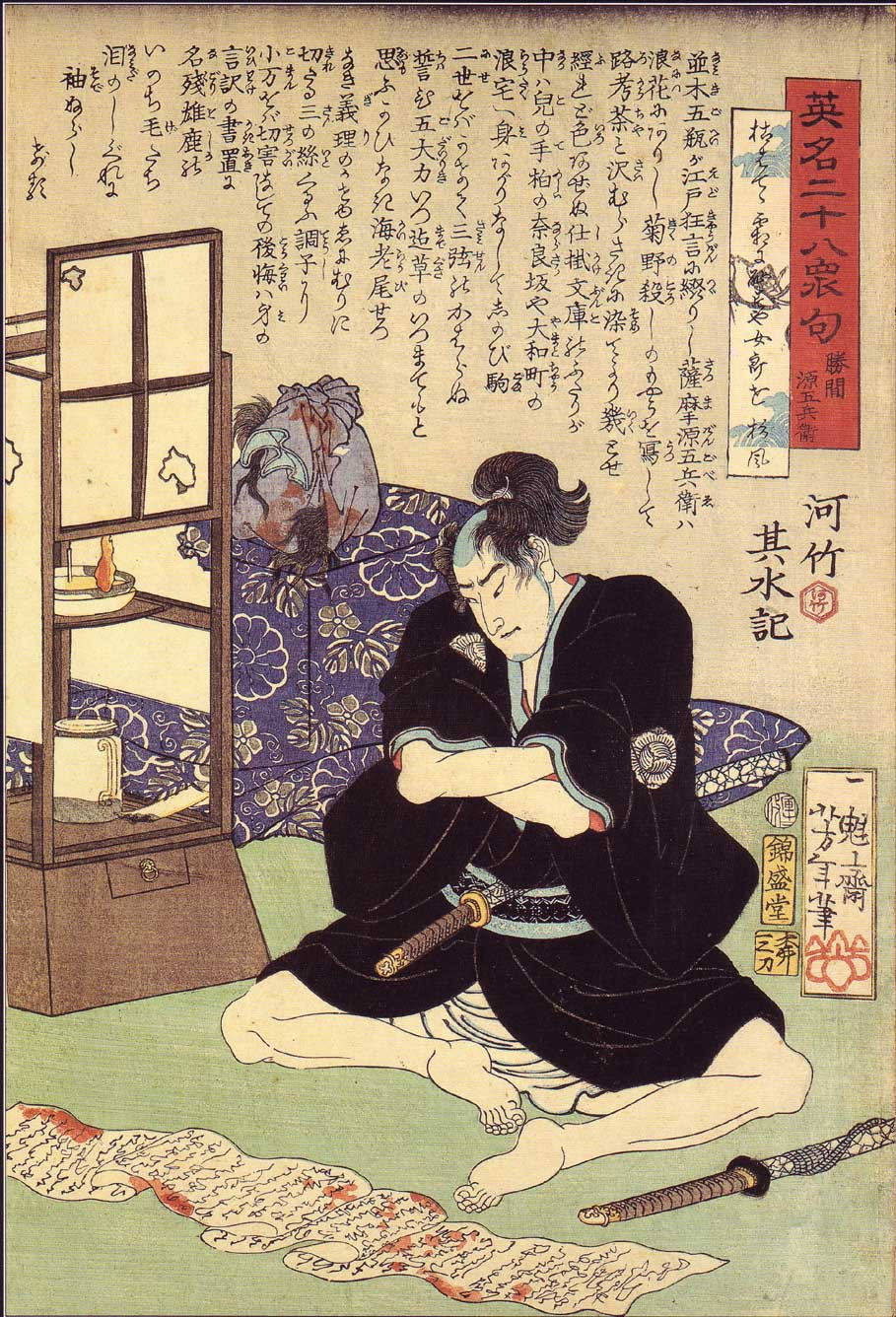
Katsuma Gengobei reading a blood-stained letter

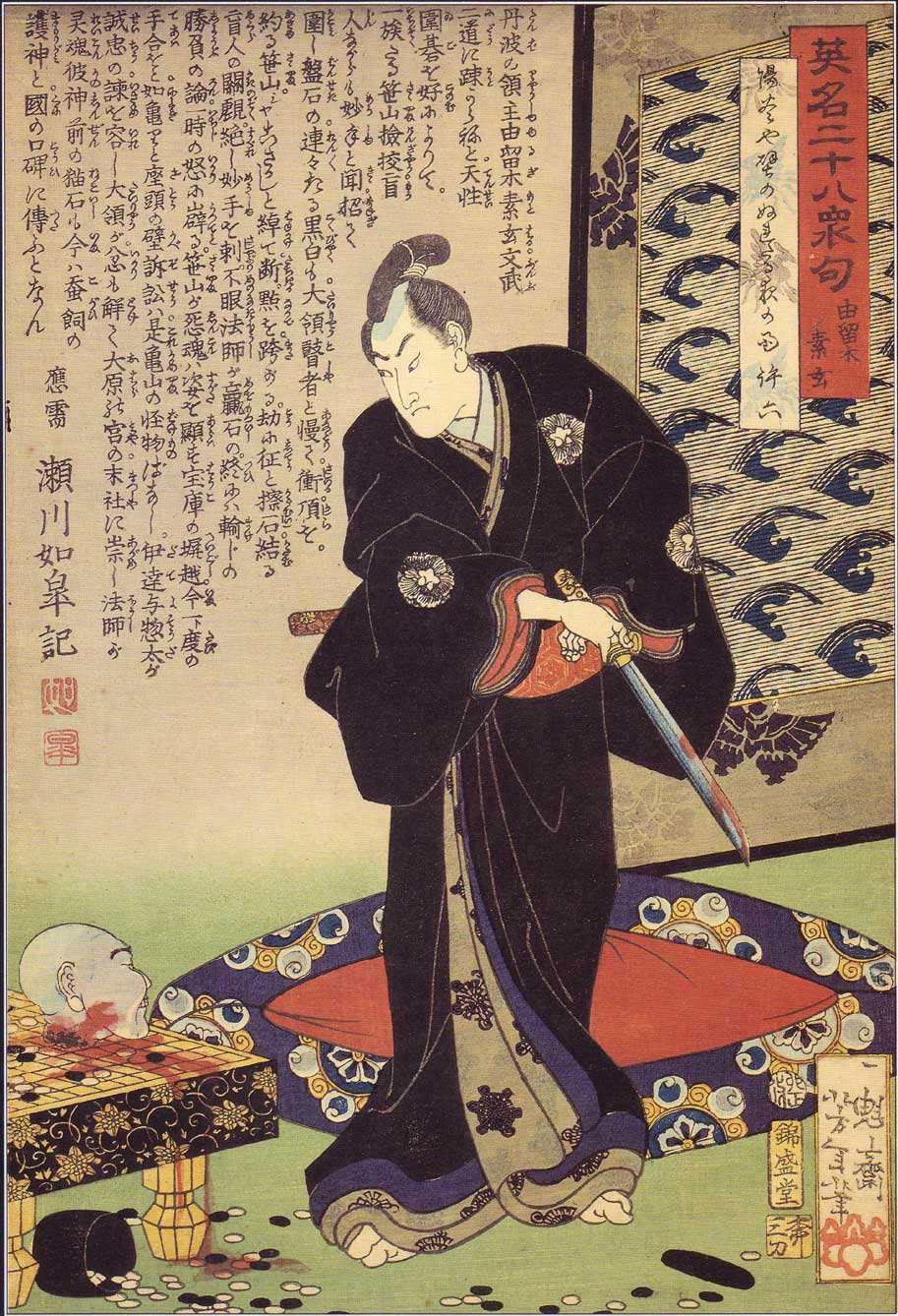
Yurugi Sogen with a head on a go board

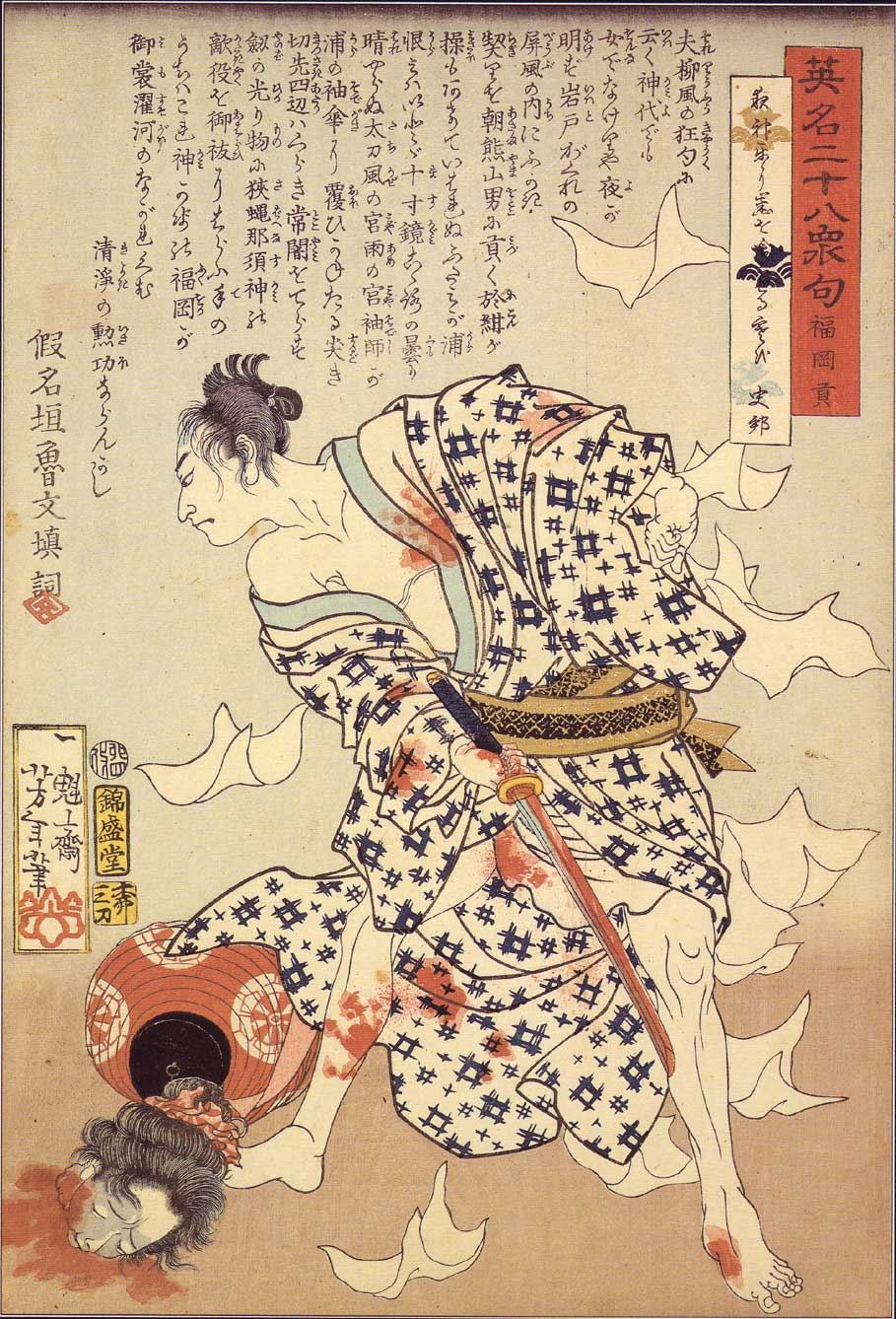
Fukuoka Mitsugi with flying papers, severed head

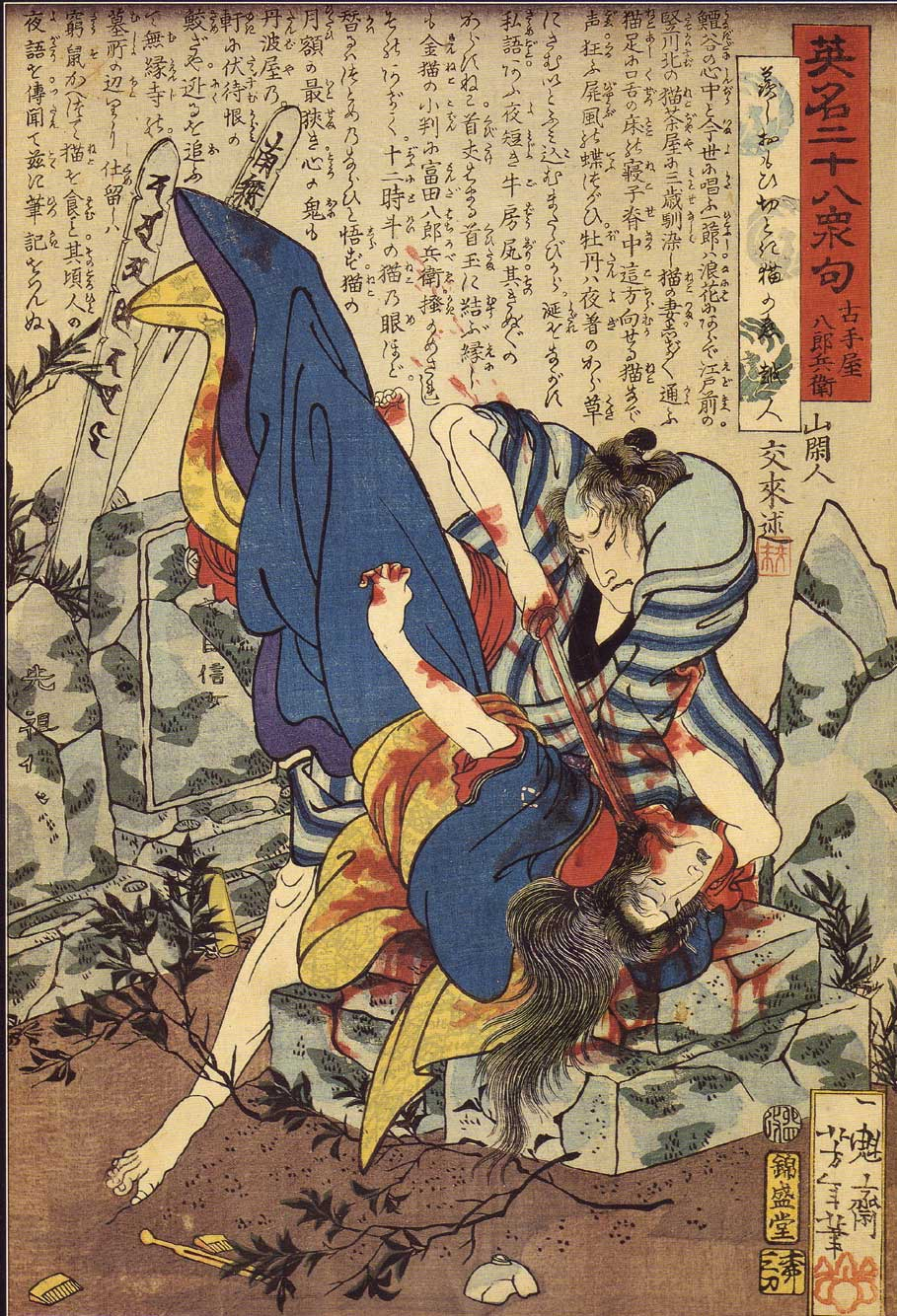
Furuteya Hachirōbei murdering a woman in a graveyard

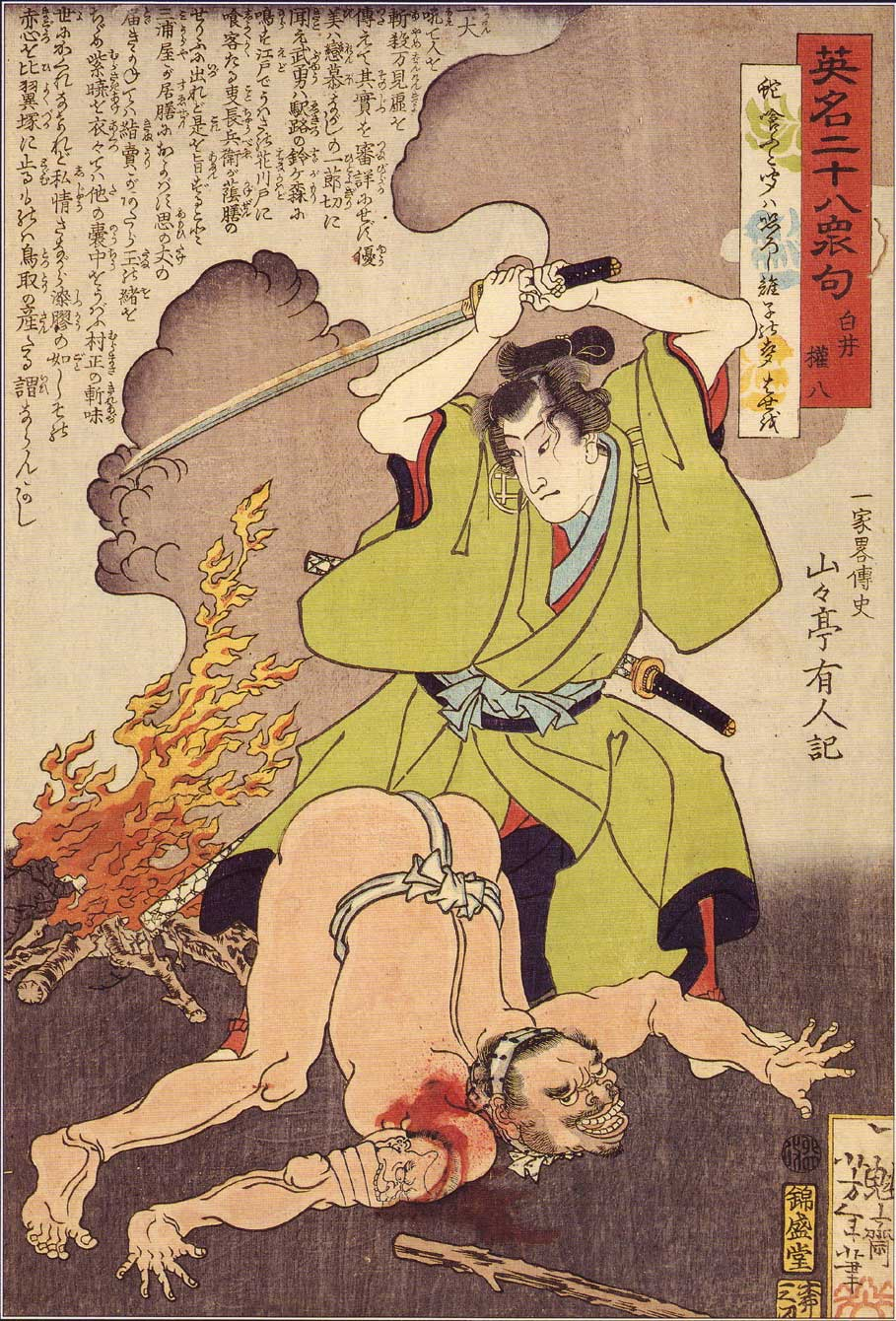
Shirai Gompachi slashing an assailant by a fire

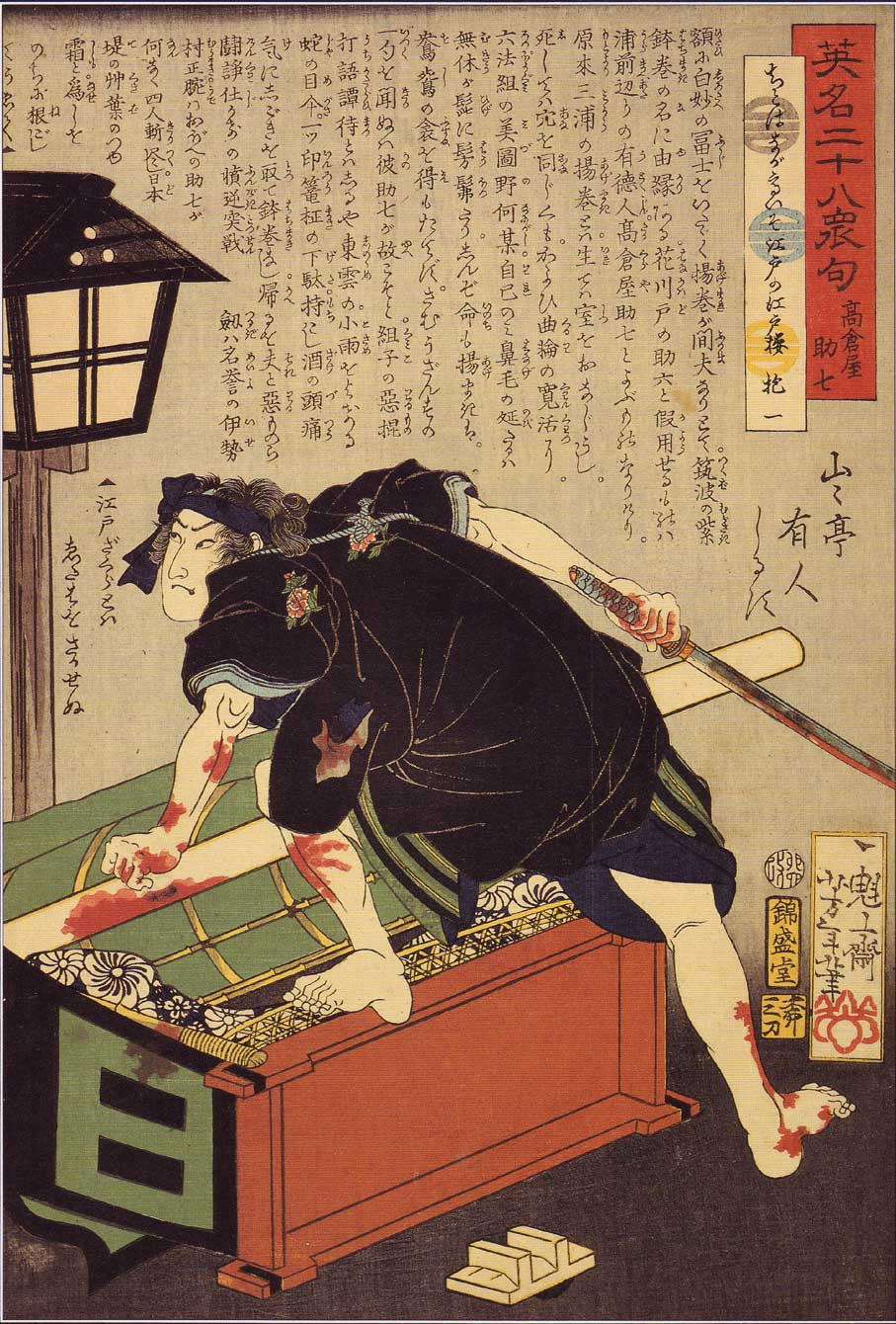
Takekura Sukekichi and overturned palanquin

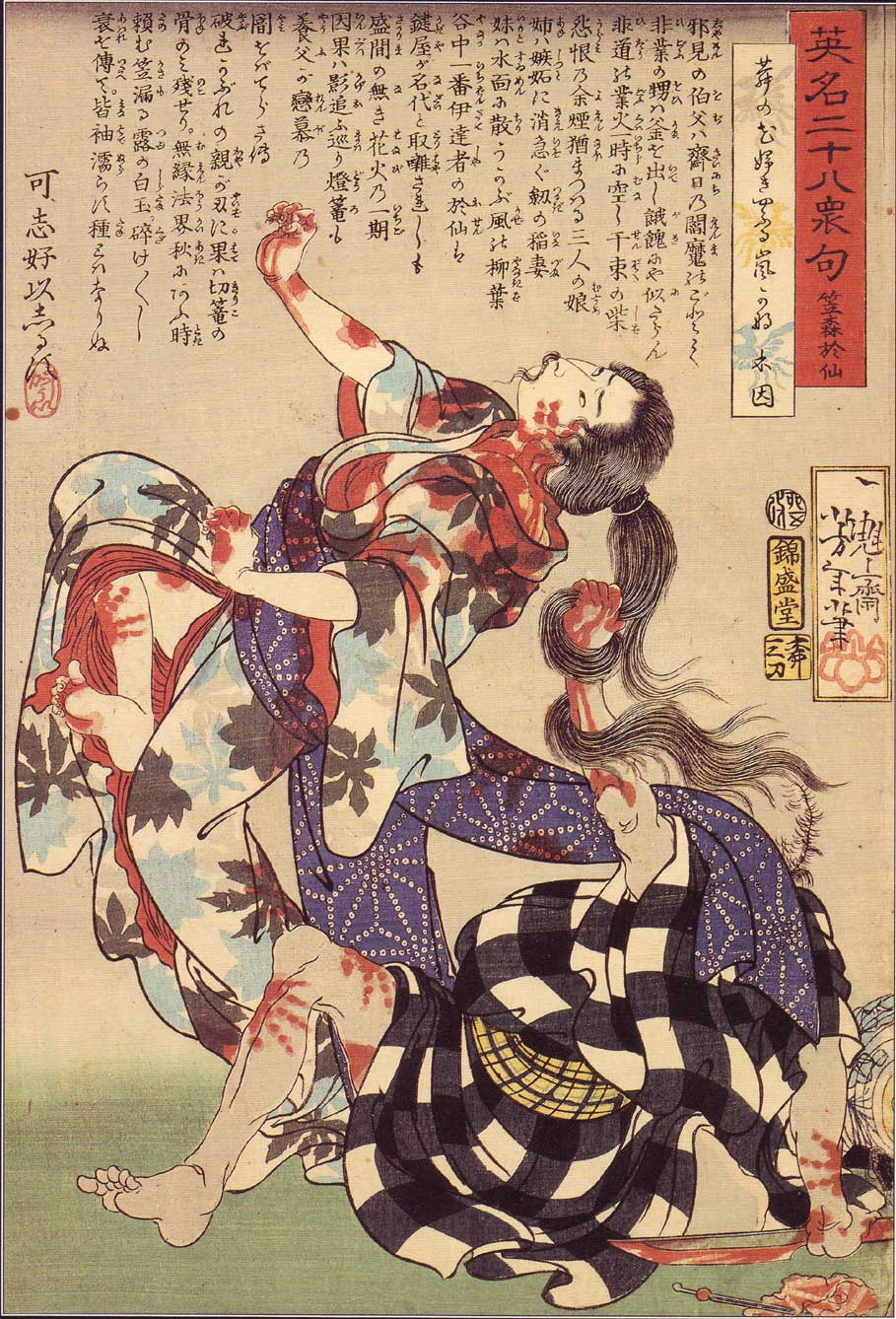
The murder of Kasamori Osen
