= Carnography =

Term referencing extended scenes of carnage, violence, and gore in media

Carnography (also carno) refers to excessive or extended scenes of carnage, violence, and gore in media such as film, literature, and images. The term carnography—a portmanteau of the words carnage and pornography—was used as early as 1972 in Time magazine's review of David Morrell's book First Blood, upon which the Rambo film series is based. Rambo was later called "carnography" as well.

The term refers to an obsession with the human body that "suggests a connection between horror and pornography", often relating to hardcore horror films. Carnography is considered taboo and a disreputable genre. It has been described as "nastily impure work", "splatter-obsessed hard core horror", and "watching flesh fly". Carnographic horror films have a "superfluous plot" in which characters are "initiated, only to be discarded", and the gore seems to be the only reason the film exists. Pornography and carnography share the feature of close, intimate physical contact, whether it be to caress or to attack.

== See also ==
- Splatter film
- Ero guro
