= Ero guro =

Japanese genre of grotesque erotica

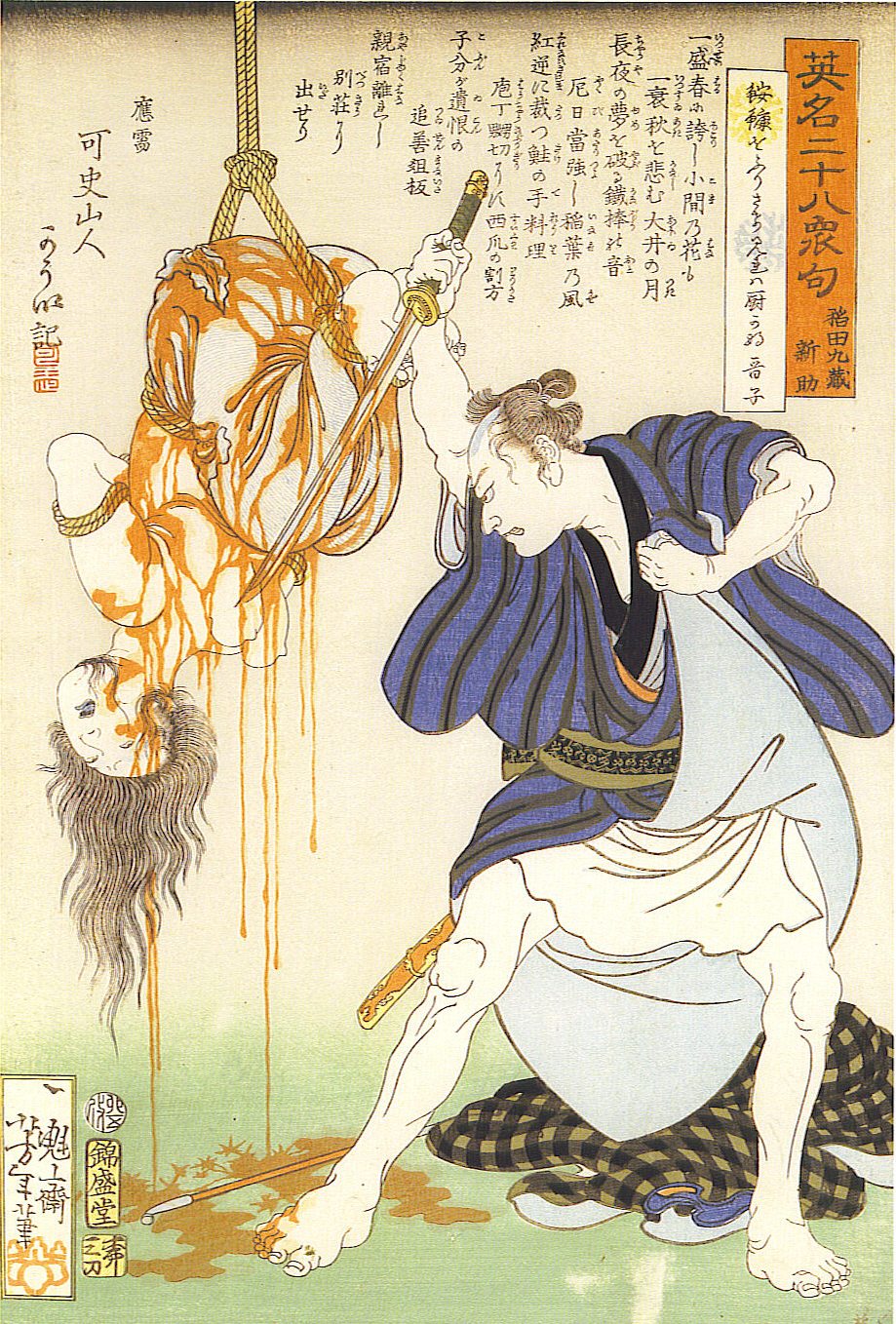
Twenty-Eight Famous Murders with Verse, early 1867 ero guro

Ero guro (Japanese: エログロ) is an artistic genre that puts its focus on eroticism, sexual corruption, and decadence. As a term, it is used to denote something that is both erotic and grotesque.

The term itself is an example of wasei-eigo, a Japanese combination of English words or abbreviated words: ero from erotic and guro from grotesque. The "grotesqueness" implied in the term refers to things that are malformed, unnatural, or horrific. Items that are pornographic and bloody are not necessarily ero guro, and vice versa. The term is often mistaken by Western audiences to mean "gore" – depictions of horror, blood, and guts.

== History ==
Ero guro art experienced a boom when ero guro nansensu, a subculture characterized as a "prewar, bourgeois cultural phenomenon that devoted itself to explorations of the deviant, the bizarre, and the ridiculous", manifested in the popular culture of Taishō Tokyo during the 1920s. Writer Ian Buruma describes the social atmosphere of the time as "a skittish, sometimes nihilistic hedonism that brings Weimar Berlin to mind."

Ero guro nansensu's first distinct appearance began in the 1920s and 1930s Japanese literature. The Sada Abe Incident of 1936, where a woman strangled her lover to death and castrated his corpse, struck a chord with the ero guro nansensu movement but shortly led to the censorship of related media. Other similar activities and movements were generally suppressed in Japan during World War II, but re-emerged in the postwar period, especially in manga and music.

Eroguro nansensu of the 20’s and 30’s was seen as a bourgeois cultural phenomenon which was partially the result of the sudden influx of Western goods into Japan after World War I. The phrase eroguro nansensu was originally coined by the media as a derogatory term for the “consumer culture organized around the consumption of things, images, and entertainment”. Those who participated did not use the term at first, but eventually appropriated it so others could find similar forms of entertainment.

Despite fading into obscurity due to Japan’s militarism and censorship, the postwar bubble of the 1980s led to the reemergence of ero guro as a movement. This led to the prominence of contemporary ero guro artist Maruo Suehiro. His art style was influenced by ads from the 20s and 30s, with his stories such as Shoujo Tsubaki taking place during the time of eroguro nansensu’s nascence.

Another one of the most important and influential post-war ero guro illustrators was Toshio Saeki. Some visual kei bands have a concept or theme relating to ero guro, most notably Cali Gari.

== See also ==
- Body horror
- Carnography
- Erotic horror
- Grotesque
- L'histoire de l'œil
- List of genres
- Marquis de Sade
- Mnemosyne (TV series)
- Muzan-e
- Ryona
- Snuff film
- Splatter film
- Tokyo Red Hood
- Urotsukidoji
