= Muzan-e =

Japanese woodblock prints

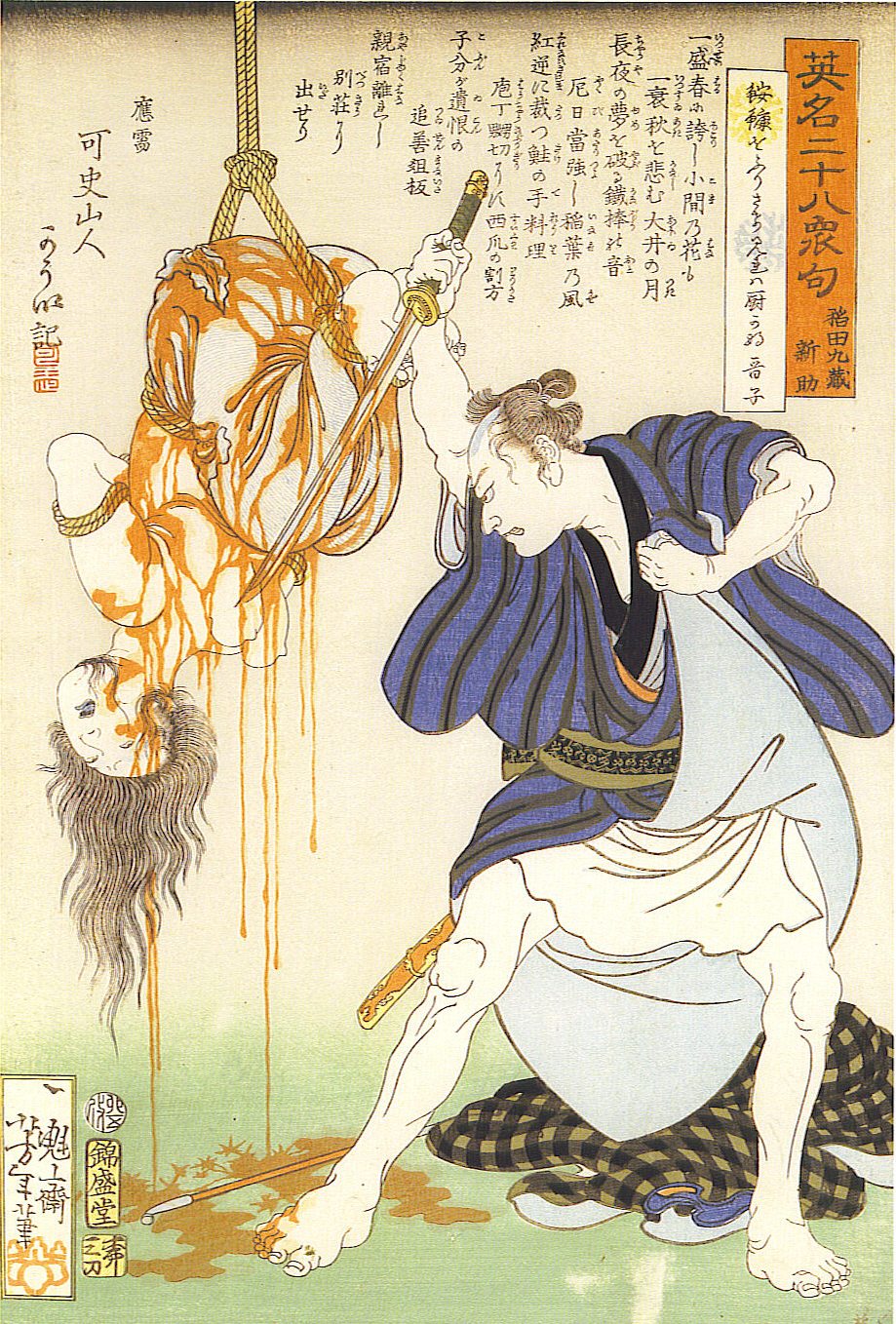
"Murder of Ohagi by Saisaburô", Twenty-eight famous murders with verse (1867)

Muzan-e (無残絵), also known as "Bloody Prints", refers to Japanese woodcut prints of violent nature published in the late Edo and Meiji periods.

One of the earliest and best-known examples is the collection Twenty-Eight Famous Murders with Verse (英名二十八衆句, eimei nijūhasshūku) by the artists Yoshitoshi and Yoshiiku from the 1860s, which depicted several gruesome acts of murder or torture based on historical events or scenes in Kabuki plays.

== Reception ==
The Muzan-e is perhaps the first example of ero guro or the erotic grotesque in Japanese culture, an art subgenre which depicts either erotic or extreme images of violence and mutilation. It has influenced many modern day art formats and ero guro can be found in manga with the works of Suehiro Maruo, Shintaro Kago or Toshio Maeda; in many live action films such as the pink film movement and most of the works of director Takashi Miike and even non-Japanese artists such as Trevor Brown.

Muzan translates from Japanese as cruelty or atrocity, and the works were said to spread a general panic amongst the populace at the time of publishing, with the extreme violence depicted in the paintings taken as a sign of social and moral decline.

=== References to the Muzan-e in other media ===
- Suehiro Maruo, a manga artist whose works are heavily influenced by the original woodcuts, and artist Kazuichi Hanawa, created a modern version of the Muzan-e in 1988 with an art book entitled Bloody Ukiyo-e. While just as bloody and disturbing as the collection it is based on, Bloody Ukiyo-e also showcases a higher degree of full frontal nudity, sexual perversion and includes pop-culture references and modern real life events, such as painting a gun-wielding Marc Bolan as a mercenary or the suicide of Adolf Hitler.
- The Muzan-e is intrinsic to the concluding story arc of the anime series Requiem from the Darkness.
- Muzan-E or Celluloid Nightmares is a 1999 Japanese movie about a female reporter investigating underground snuff tapes.
