= Ryona =

Hentai genre

The word ryona (リョナ, ryona; a blend of ryōki ("seeking the bizarre") and onanī ("masturbation")) is a type of sexual fetish in hentai wherein a protagonist is subject to sexual, physical, or psychological abuse from an offender. The term is mostly used in connection to Japanese culture, although the themes of misogyny, sadomasochism, compassion, exoticism, and extreme erotica is seen in many other cultures.

The term ryona almost exclusively refers to the action of a distressed woman being abused and dominated by men at an extreme level as its narrative centerpiece. In a case where the target is male, it is more commonly called gyaku-ryona (逆リョナ, gyaku-ryona; "reverse ryona"), and generally implies content with a female assailant and a male victim. The genre focuses exclusively on fictional characters in these situations. In some cases, the perpetrator could be a monster or other non-human being.

Because the fetish is very broad in scope, it often contrasted with or incorporates other, more common, fetishes such as humiliation, sexual sadism, and rape pornography. Ryona is a complex and nuanced voyeuristic fantasy fetish, a romanticized subgenre often of non-explicit sexual nature.

Pornographic works featuring ryona are often mistaken as ero guro, due to the common misconception of guro (グロ) being a shorthand for gore. However, ryona can be considered distinct from ero guro due to its exclusive focus on excessive graphic violence, primarily against women, and its origins in sexual sadism.

== Description ==
Works in the ryona genre depict torture and/or death, often through the use of external devices (such as the wooden horse). These devices, as well as the resulting injuries/death, are often unrealistic and/or exaggerated. Erotic amputation is also commonly featured in ryona-focused work, such as in the erotic visual novel Manakashi no Yuri wa Akaku Somaru.
