= Ero guro nansensu =

Artistic eroticism movement in Japan

Ero guro nansensu (Japanese: エロ・グロ・ナンセンス) is a specific set of cultural trends that arose during the Shōwa era in Japan. Ero guro nansensu is a wasei-eigo word derived from the English words erotic, grotesque, and nonsense.

== Overview ==
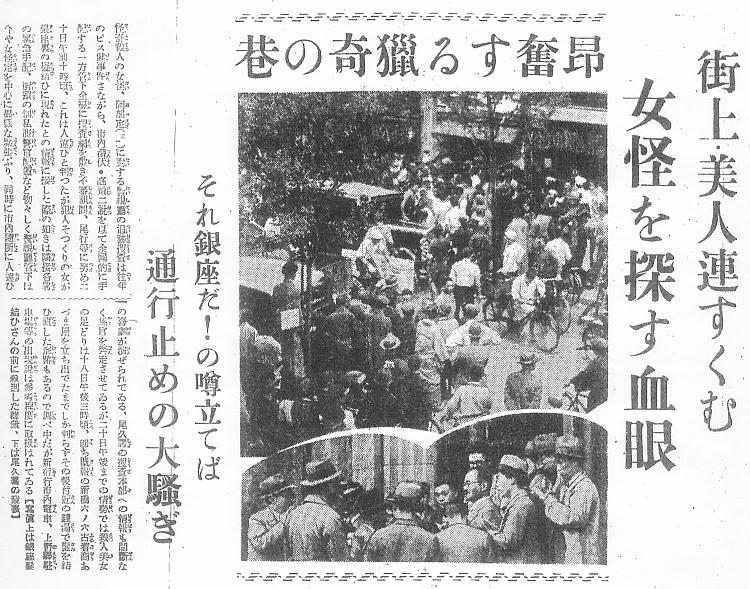
"The Sada Abe Panic" May 1936. Newspapers of the time reported on crowds gathered in the streets following news of the Sada Abe Incident, noting the nonsensical nature of the incident.

Apt to its namesake, this period of time in Japan saw a large increase in the release of literature, magazines, news articles, and music centered around erotic grotesqueness. The popularization of such media arose during the advent of the Great Depression (1929) and died down following the February 26 incident. After the publishing of Edogawa Ranpo's short story, "Injū" (陰獣), in the magazine Shinseinen in 1928, Japanese society saw a boom of bizarre and grotesque media. That same year, Yumeno Kyūsaku published his novel Binzume no Jigoku (瓶詰の地獄). Around this time, nansensu was added to ero guro as a buzzword that draws from the established sense of erotic grotesqueness to convey a certain style of media, culture and lifestyle. The 1932 publication of Complete Works of Edogawa Ranpo (江戸川乱歩全集, Edogawa Ranpo Zenshū) marks the peak of this boom. In 1936, Kyūsaku died shortly after the release of his novel Dogra Magra (ドグラマグラ). Ranpo moved to works aimed towards younger male audiences with his release of Kaijin ni-jū Mensō (怪人二十面相) in the same year, and many of his previous novels either went out of print, or were banned as war efforts became increasingly pervasive. The boom of bizarre media ended around this time.

The massive news coverage of the Sada Abe incident in May 1936 is seen as a pivotal element of the ero guro nansensu movement. Shortly afterwards, the popular song "Wasurecha Iya yo" (忘れちゃいやヨ), released earlier in March of the same year, was banned from airing in June on the grounds that it was too erotic. The ero guro nansensu period is said to have ended with the start of NHK Kokumin Kayō radio broadcasts during the same month.

Along with several books which had managed to avoid censorship by the Ministry of Home Affairs, books of this theme that had been banned during this period are often circulated through book-buying clubs as underground books and are subject to study and analysis. Many books of this era were banned for their propoundment of radical ideologies such as anarchism, but most were banned on the grounds of their ero guro nansensu content.

After the conclusion of World War II, censored books of this period resided in the National Diet Library as "Banned Books held under Possession by the National Diet Library", but some books were confiscated by American forces during the Occupation of Japan. The National Diet Library has worked with the American Library of Congress to digitize this content, including material that would have been considered obscene back in the day, but are not by today's standards (e.g. Kiyoshi Sakai's (ja) Eroero Soushi). Much of this content is free to view online if copyright laws have allowed for it to be available as such. Pages that had been censored from these books have also been re-released to the public under these archives. However, because of the relatively recent commencement of public access to these libraries, there have been few in-depth analyses of the works. With the efforts of librarians such as Noritada Ōtaki (ja), endeavors to encourage studies of these books and further extensions of access to the public have been made. However, of the roughly 11,000 books banned during this period, the National Diet Library only holds about 7,000. The rest of the books exist only in personal collections or are lost works.

Unlike books which have gained the reputation of being "underground" after being banned, books that were written to be circulated discreetly and thus avoid charges of obscenity are rarely held by the National Diet Library, so researchers make an effort to hunt down the books themselves. Even publishers of these books may not know the whereabouts of any existing copies, making knowledge of these books scarce in underground-literature circles. In 2011, a specialist in and collector of banned books, Jō Ichirō, donated roughly 7,000 books of this nature to Meiji University.

Major publishers responsible for popularizing the movement include Hakubunkan, which published Shinseinen, and Heibonsha, which published Edogawa Ranpo Zenshū.

=== Censorship ===
Under the Empire of Japan, all major publications were heavily monitored by the Home Ministry Police Affairs Bureau and, in some cases, censored. Books, news articles, and magazines containing ero guro nansensu material were immediately subject to prohibition from being sold or published. Standards for censorship were not well understood, and even works such as Sakutarō Hagiwara's Tsuki ni Hoeru (月に吠える) (which came to be considered a masterpiece after World War II) had its first edition banned from sale.

In the 1920s, major publishers began to take preemptive measures to avoid censorship and implemented "private perusal". In a system of prepublication self-censorship, they consulted official censors and erased words from their content that would face scrutiny for obscenity before they were even printed. However, even with these measures in place, the July 1926 publication of Kaizō was banned from sale altogether, prompting the publishing industry to fight back against the overbearing censorship. That same year, the Japan Writers' Association formed the Committee for the Revision of Censorship Policy (制度改正期成同盟) and spoke to Hamaguchi Osachi (then the home minister) directly, pressuring him to make changes to the censorship system. These efforts eventually allowed for the abolition of "private perusal" in many publishers in the following year.

With the passage of the General Election Law and Taishō Democracy at its peak, Kaizōsha, the publisher of Kaizō, began to publish enpon (円本), books that collected modern Japanese literature that could be purchased for one yen, to make up for its faltering magazine sales. Soon enough, not just small and medium-sized publishers, but also large publishers followed suit, publishing cheap and accessible ero guro nansensu literature in the form of enpon. The liberal atmosphere of the time fostered a rebellious temperament amongst the publishing industry, one which disregarded the censorship and bans placed upon their books. As usual, the censorship was strict, and some publishers still self-censored, but some companies played around with the law in various ways; for example, some included a "Table of Omitted Words" as a piece of paper attached to their books, so the reader understand what was being censored.

In theory, a book banned under this policy would not be able to make it onto the market. Nonetheless, many books of this nature managed to circumvent the authorities through various means. Ero guro nansensu literature gained a reputation for being "underground" as they were circulated through secret buying clubs. One method used to avoid censorship was to conduct "guerrilla releases", in which the released books were to be almost completely sold out before delivering them to the Home Ministry for review. A few copies of the books would be kept specifically to be confiscated if the Home Ministry deemed it to be unworthy for public release. A list released post-World War II by one of the buying clubs distributing these works, Sōtaikai, revealed the then-president of Dai-ichi Tokyo Bar Association, Kiyosaku Toyohara, along with many other intellectuals of the time, as members of the buying club. To describe such books as "underground" may be an overstatement, as the scale of these operations were quite large, evidenced by lawyers who testified against such buying clubs.

Large publishing companies during this time period also engaged in guerrilla releases. For example, in 1932 the company Heibonsha published an appendix to Edogawa Ranpo Zenshū, entitled "Hanzai Zukan" (犯罪図鑑) which was promptly banned from sale for "corruption of public morals". The boom in ero guro nansensu media inspired Heibonsha and other large publishers such as Shinchosha to release large amounts of bannable content.

There were no laws during this period regarding audio media and as a result, erotic music developed into a popular genre of the time. In 1934, a revision on publishing legislation made audio media subject to censorship and bans, though enforcement of these laws was relatively low for a while.

In 1936, enforcement of censorship began to increase and under the Public Order and Police Law of 1900, old music and audio records were also subject to banning. The first record to be censored was a comic dialogue, on the grounds that it was "too playful" ("ふざけすぎている"). Another popular song at the time, "Wasurecha Iya yo" was banned and copies withdrawn for being too erotic, warranting the offense of "disturbing public law and order, damaging customs". This led to the introduction of a de facto pre-emptive self-censorship system in the Japanese recording industry, conducted with the consultation of officials from the Home Ministry.

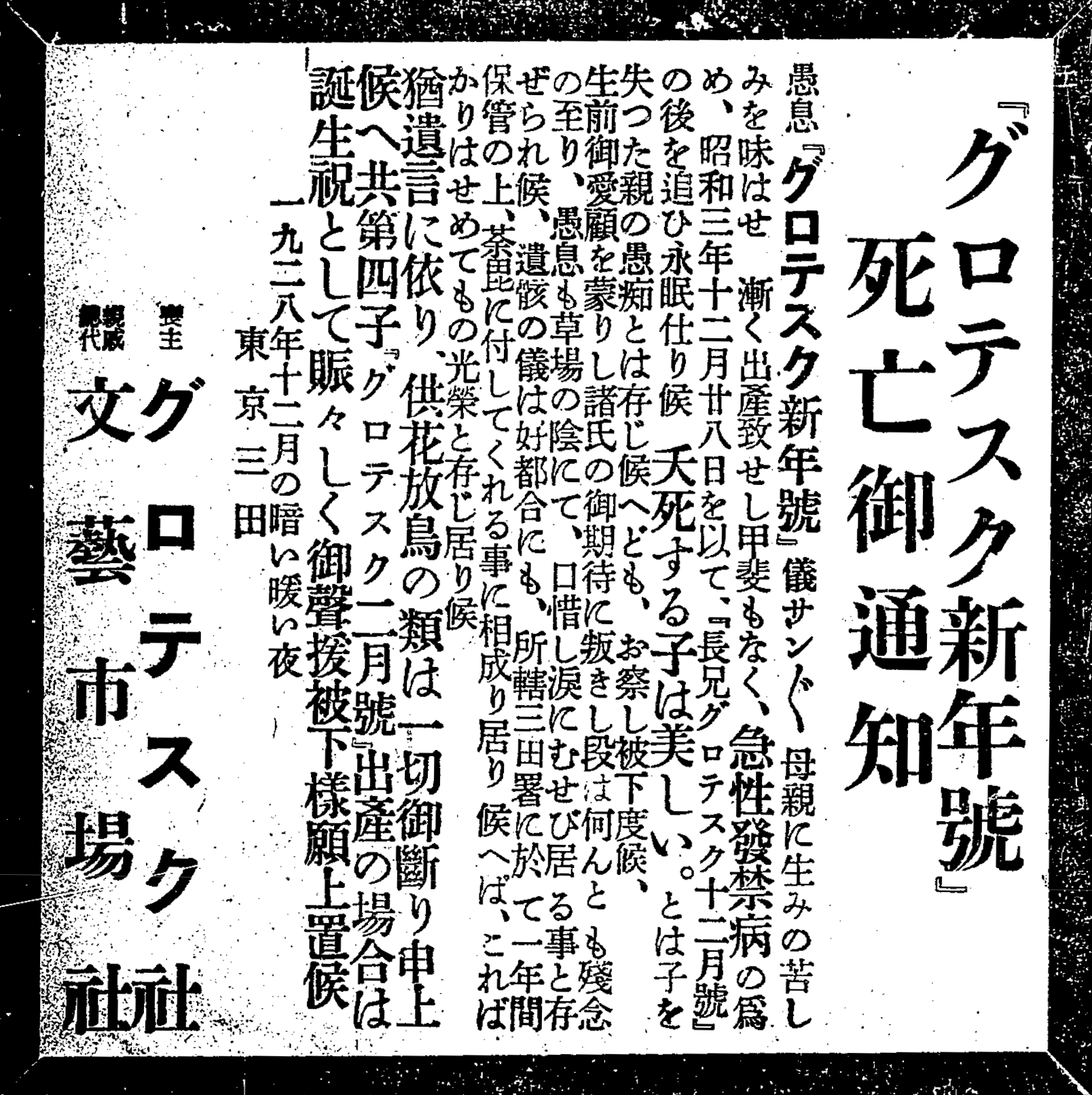
A newspaper headline announcing the ban of Hokumei Umehara's magazine Grotesque. Umehara was extolled as the "King of Underground Publishing" in ero guro nansensu culture. (December 1928)

Because punishment for publishing media that was banned was minimal (the maximum jail sentence was under two years, but most publishers were simply fined), there were some people who specialized in publishing such media. Miyatake Gaikotsu's literature was repeatedly banned throughout the Meiji, Taishō, and Shōwa eras, and even during the occupation of Japan through Allied General Headquarters. However, one such writer named Hokumei Umehara (ja) was placed under constant surveillance and eventually deported from Japan.

In 1925, a new law termed the Peace Preservation Law was put in place to suppress political dissent. The highest punishment for breaking this law was the death penalty. Offenders were known to be placed under imprisonment by the Special Higher Police without trial and brutally tortured. However, this punishment was not usually enforced on ero guro nansensu media produced by underground publishers. Kaizōsha faced multiple bans on its left-wing publications (for example Takiji Kobayashi's 1929 novel Kani Kōsen), but these were only subject to normal publication laws, not the Public Security Preservation Law. Kaizōsha went on publishing writers like Edogawa Ranpo without any subsequent bans. Because of this, it is theorized that the Home Ministry tacitly consented to the left wing's ero guro nansensu subculture under the premise that it kept its "eroticism over terrorism" and "pink over red". However, this may also simply be because the distinction between socialist publications and ero guro nansensu publications is rather vague in publication legislation. In his book Proletarian Literature is Incredible (プロレタリア文学はものすごい), ero guro nansensu researcher Aratsuki Hiroshi emphasizes that proletarian literature of the era was "sexually perverted" and "erotic and grotesque".

In the years following 1936, enforcement of censorship heightened as the Second Sino-Japanese War begun. As a result, ero guro nansensu publications were restricted, and publishers who once advocated the ero guro nansensu culture lost their rebellious temperament. Edogawa Ranpo, whose work largely contributed to the boom of ero guro media in the 1930s was struck with a ban on his short story "Imo Mushi" (芋虫), and many of his previous books were taken out of print.

After the downfall of the liberal atmosphere that fostered ero guro nansensu culture during the Second Sino-Japanese war, it experienced a revival during the post-war generation, termed après-guerre (アプレゲール). New kasutori magazines (カストリ雑誌), cheap magazines that took advantage of the liberalization of publication laws, contained sexual and grotesque content and led to a resurgence of ero guro nansensu, restoring the liberal atmosphere of the Shōwa era.

After the establishment of the Constitution of Japan, ero guro nansensu media still faced suppression. Notably, Michiyo Ogura, a writer and member of Sōtaikai arrested before wartime, resumed her writings after the war, but was arrested again in 1957 in violation of Article 175 of the Penal Code. It was only after 1970, with the relaxation of laws dealing with obscene media that ero guro nansensu content was completely free of legislative scrutiny. In the 1990s, Heibonsha reissued Hanzai Zukan. After 2010, the National Diet Library started to publish its collection of banned literature onto its online digital collection.

== See also ==
- Literary modernism
- Proletarian literature
- Underground culture
- Ero guro
- Edogawa Ranpo
- Samizdat
- Decadent movement
- Buraiha
