= Dojikko =

Extremely clumsy female character in anime and manga

Unofficial personification of Wikipedia and mascot Wikipe-tan assembling a 3D jigsaw puzzle that collapses

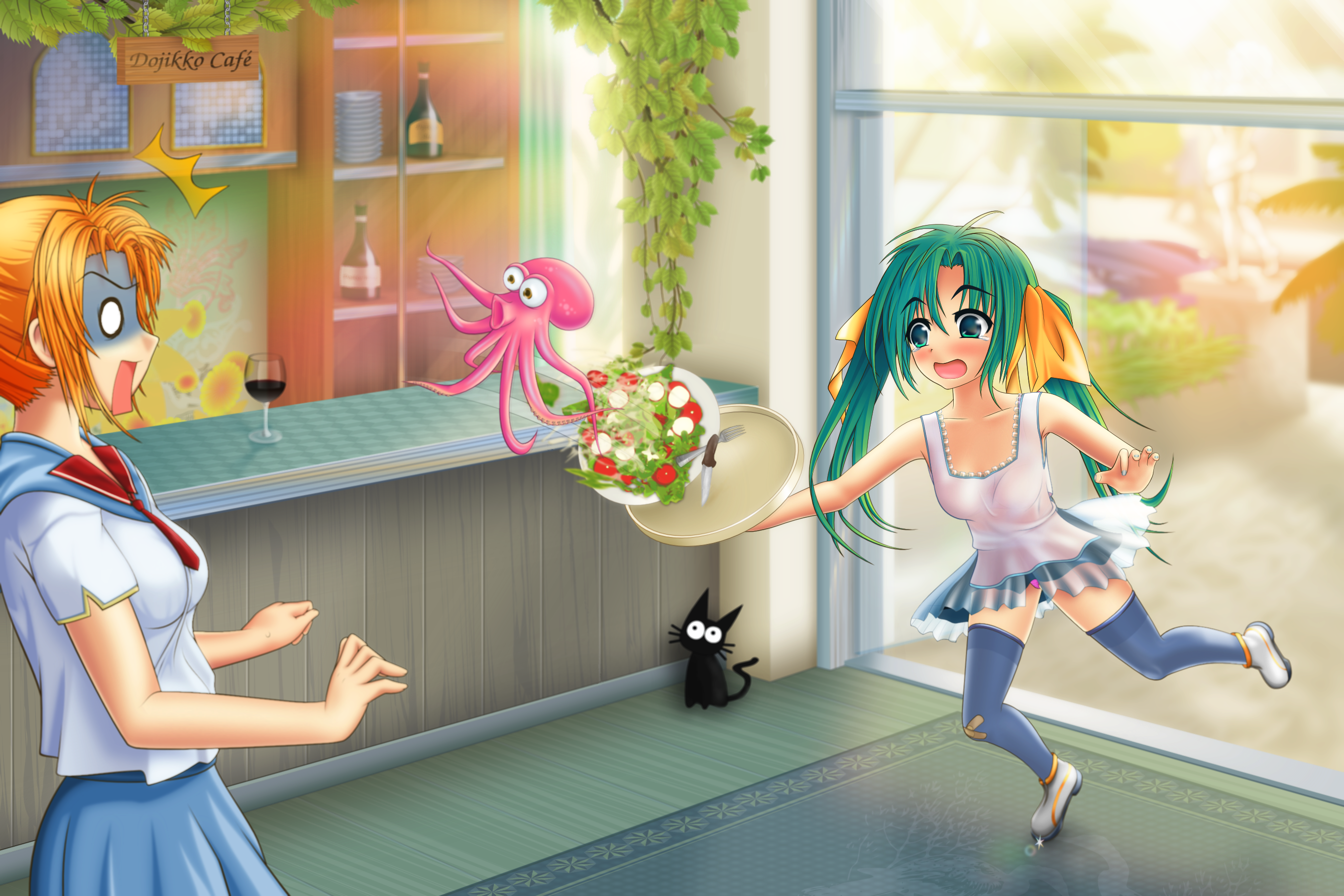
A dojikko girl spills a plate with an octopus and salad

Dojikko (ドジっ娘), in otaku culture terminology, refers to an extremely clumsy female (doji means "blunder" in Japanese). The type is used as a stock character in Japanese light novels, anime, and manga.

The word can also be written as "ドジっ子". Spelled like this, it can refer to male characters as well.

Generally, the girl is pretty and cute or so sweet and innocent that readers are expected to like her. She repeatedly fails in everyday house and school activities, like housework, sport competitions, even simply walking. She frequently falls, runs into things, or trips over the lowest obstacles. Even though she is annoyed at her misfortunes, a dojikko always shows her good side and regrets messing things up. Examples of dojikko behaviour include slipping on stairs, knocking over a drink, breaking a dish while serving customers, and other such slapstick.

Although in anime, video games and other works of the otaku subculture, cute clumsiness is one of the attributes of moe characters designed for male audiences to fall in love with, main protagonists of shōjo manga are also often dojikko; examples being Hiromi Oka in Aim for the Ace! and Usagi Tsukino in Sailor Moon.

Attraction towards dojikko characters is called "dojikko-moe" (ドジっ娘萌え).
