= Utagawa Yoshiiku =

Japanese artist (1833 - 1904)

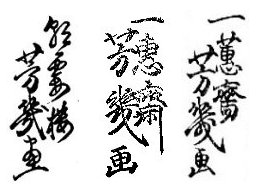
Signatures of Utagawa Yoshiiku reading from left to right: “Chōkarō Yoshiiku ga” (朝霞楼 芳幾 画), “Ikkeisai Yoshiiku ga” (一恵斎 芳幾 画), and “Ikkunsai Yoshiiku ga” (一薫斎 芳幾 画)

Utagawa Yoshiiku (歌川 芳幾; 1833 – 6 February 1904), also known as or Ochiai Yoshiiku (落合 芳幾), was a Japanese artist of the Utagawa school.

== Life and career ==
Born the son of teahouse proprietor Asakusa Tamichi in 1833, Yoshiiku became a student of ukiyo-e artist Utagawa Kuniyoshi toward the end of the 1840s. His earliest known work dates to 1852 when he provided the backgrounds to some actor prints by his master.

Yoshiiku's earliest works were portraits of actors (yakusha-e), beauties (bijin-ga), and warriors (musha-e). He later followed Kuniyoshi into making satirical and humorous pieces, and became the leading name in the field after Kuniyoshi's death in 1861. By the Meiji period, however, his former rival and fellow Kuniyoshi pupil Tsukioka Yoshitoshi, prolific and by then working under the gō Taiso, had overtaken Yoshiiku as the dominant figure in ukiyo-e, garnering greater acclaim among their contemporaries. He illustrated the Tokyo Nichi Nichi Shimbun ("Tokyo Daily News") from 1874 to 1876, and then co-founded the Tokyo E-iri Shinbun ("Tokyo Illustrated News"). The latter folded in 1889, and Yoshiiku returned to making prints. He struggled during his last years, and his last known print appeared in 1903. His three known students, Ikumura, Ikuei, and Ikumasa, failed to achieve recognition.

Yoshiiku had ten children with his second wife, only one of whom survived childhood. Yoshiiku died at age 71 in a temporary residence on 6 February 1904 in Honjo. He was buried at Anseiji temple in Asakusa and given the posthumous Buddhist name Juzen'in Hōkinikkaku Koji.

== Prints ==
Yoshiiku's works include the print Kokkei Wanisshi-ki (滑稽倭日史記, "Comical Record of Japanese History"), which employs the traditional theme of Hyakki Yagyō on contemporary Japanese military actions in China. He cooperated with Tsukioka Yoshitoshi in the production of the muzan-e ("cruel pictures") series Eimei nijūhasshūku ("Twenty-eight famous murders with verse").

=== Gallery ===
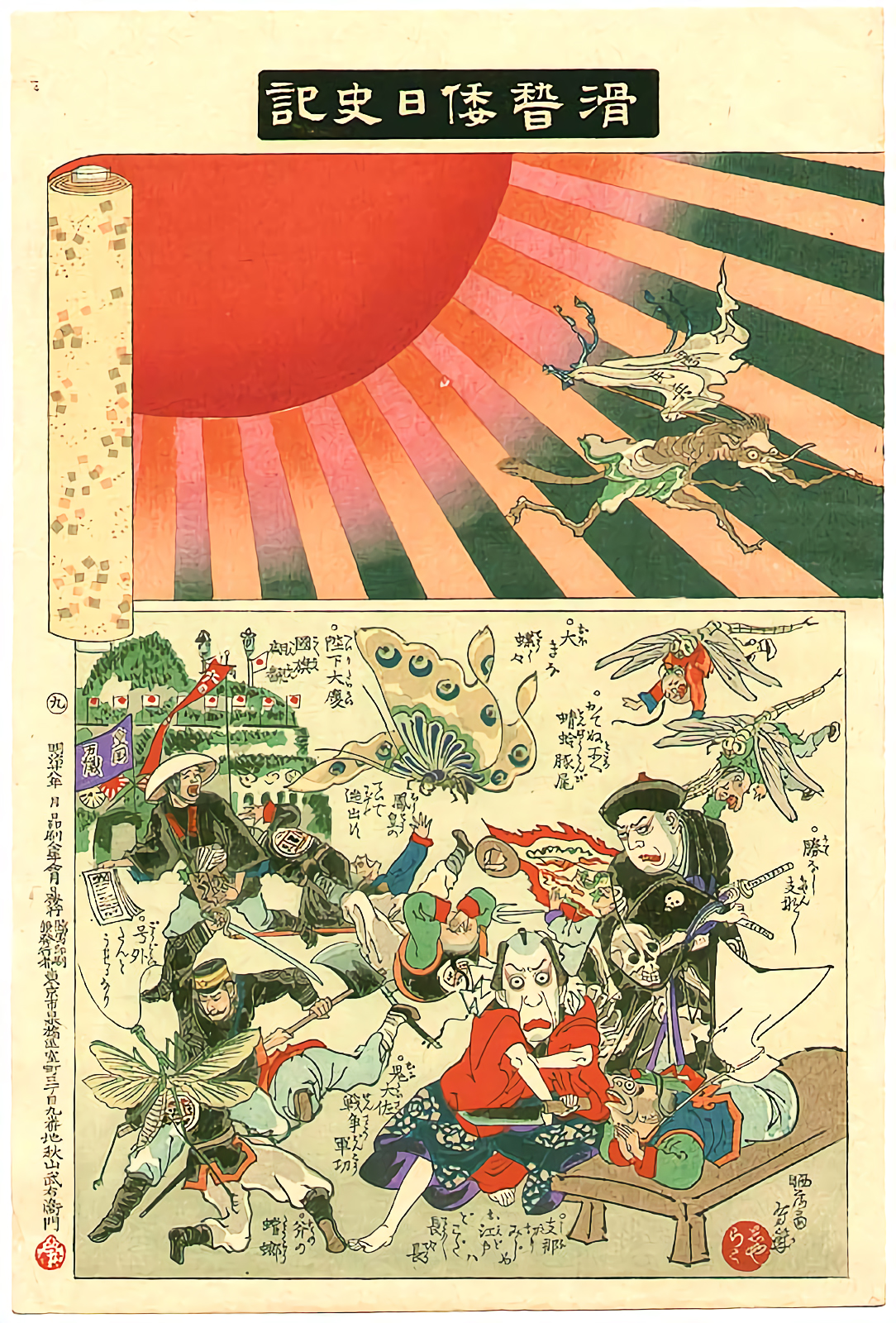
Sino-Japanese War, Butterfly and Praying Mantis, 1895

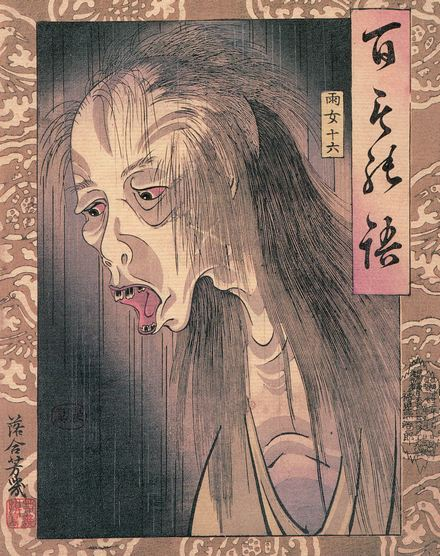
A female rain spirit (Hyakumonogatari Ameonna), 1890

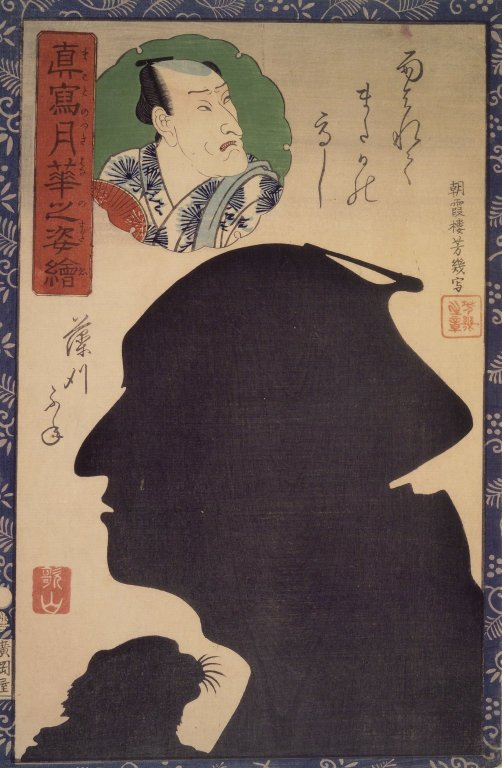
Portraits as True Likeness in the Moonlight (Makoto no Tsukihana no Sugata-e), c. 1845–1865. Woodblock print, 35.1 cm × 23 cm (13.8 in × 9.1 in)

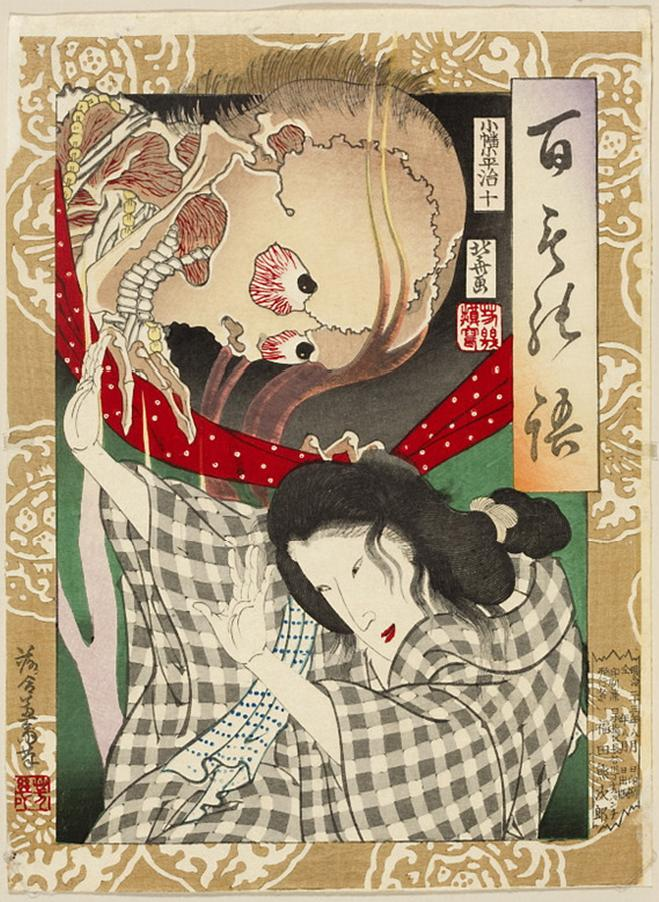
Specter frightening a young woman, 1890

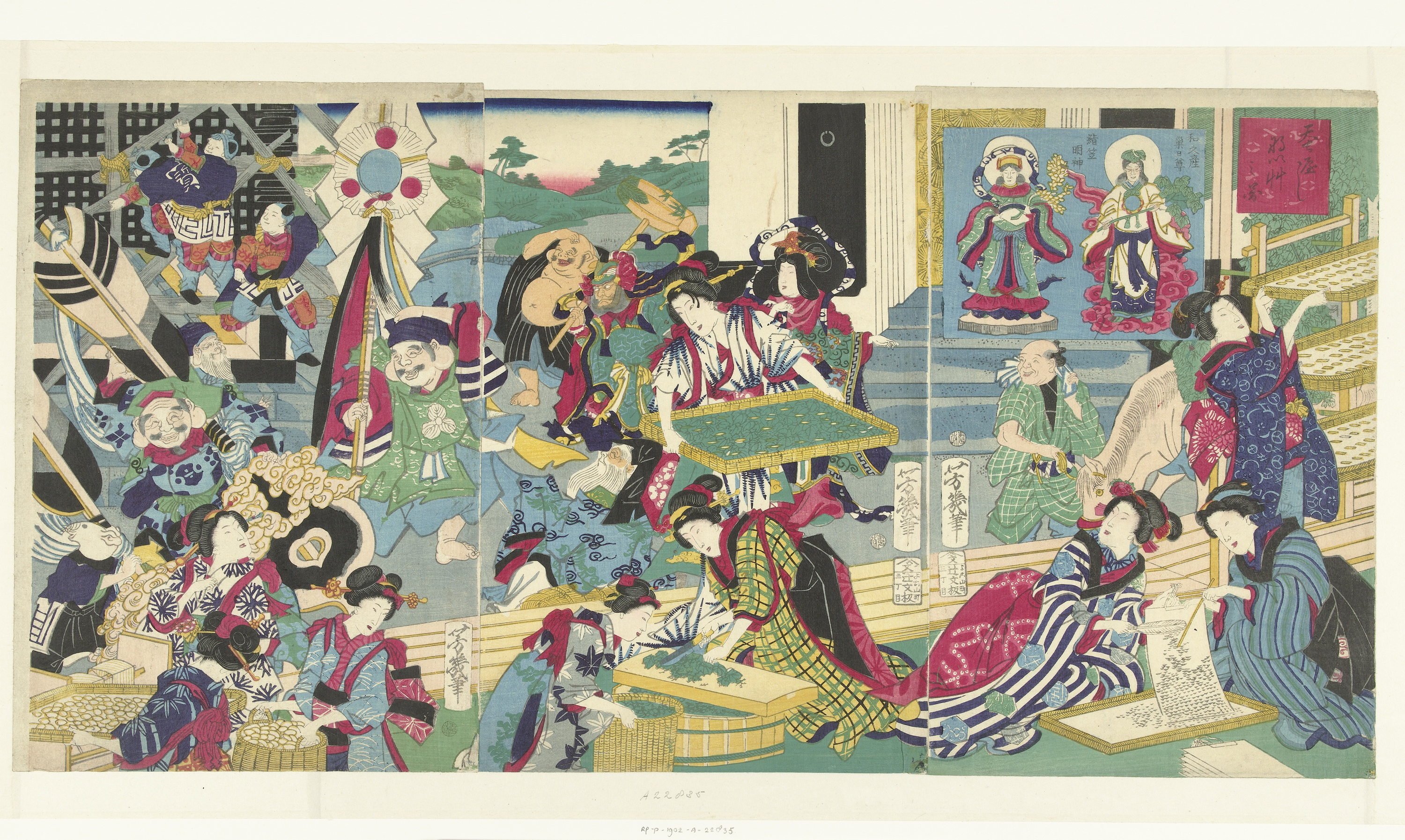
The Seven Gods of Luck in Silkworm Breeding, 1875

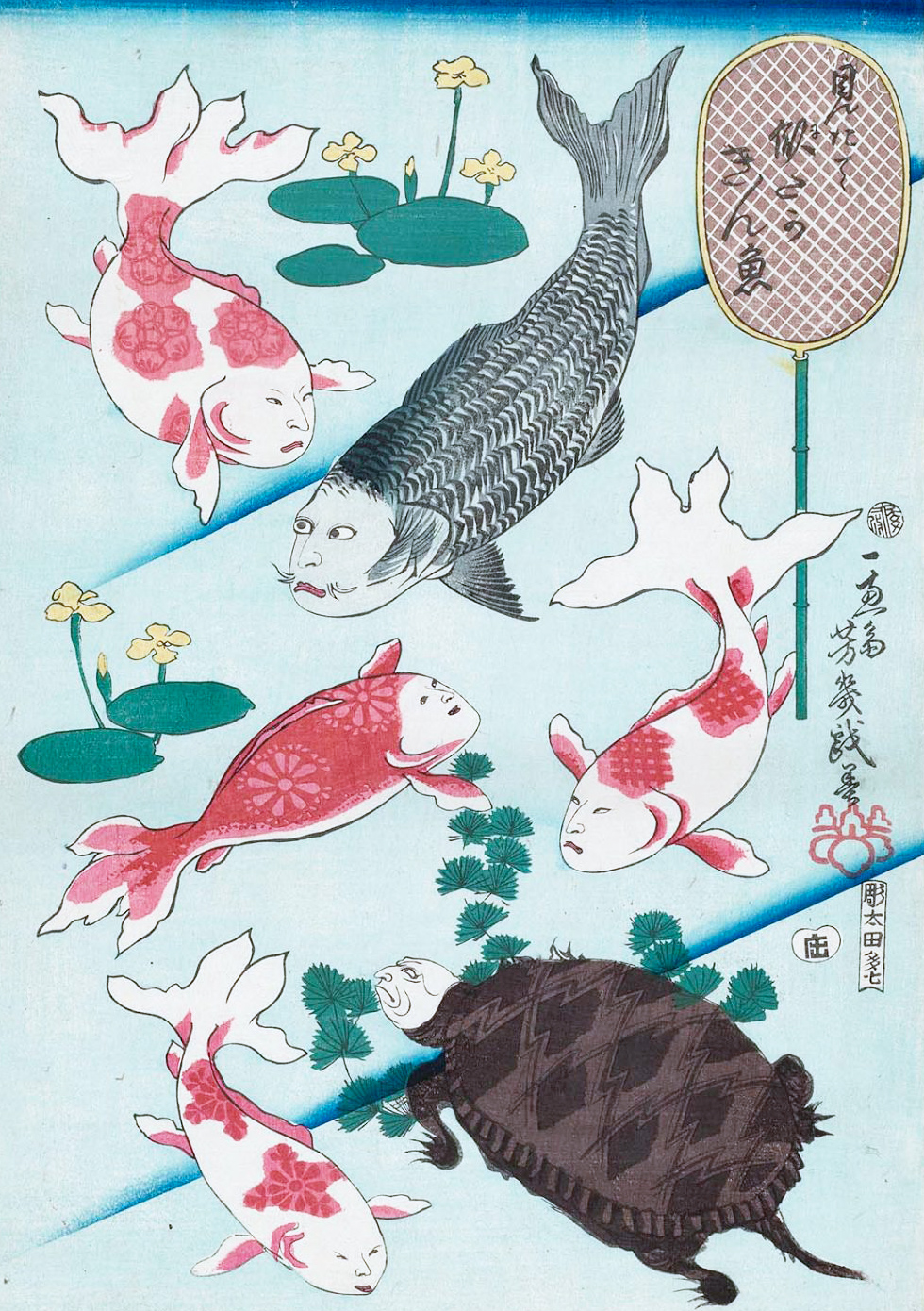
1863

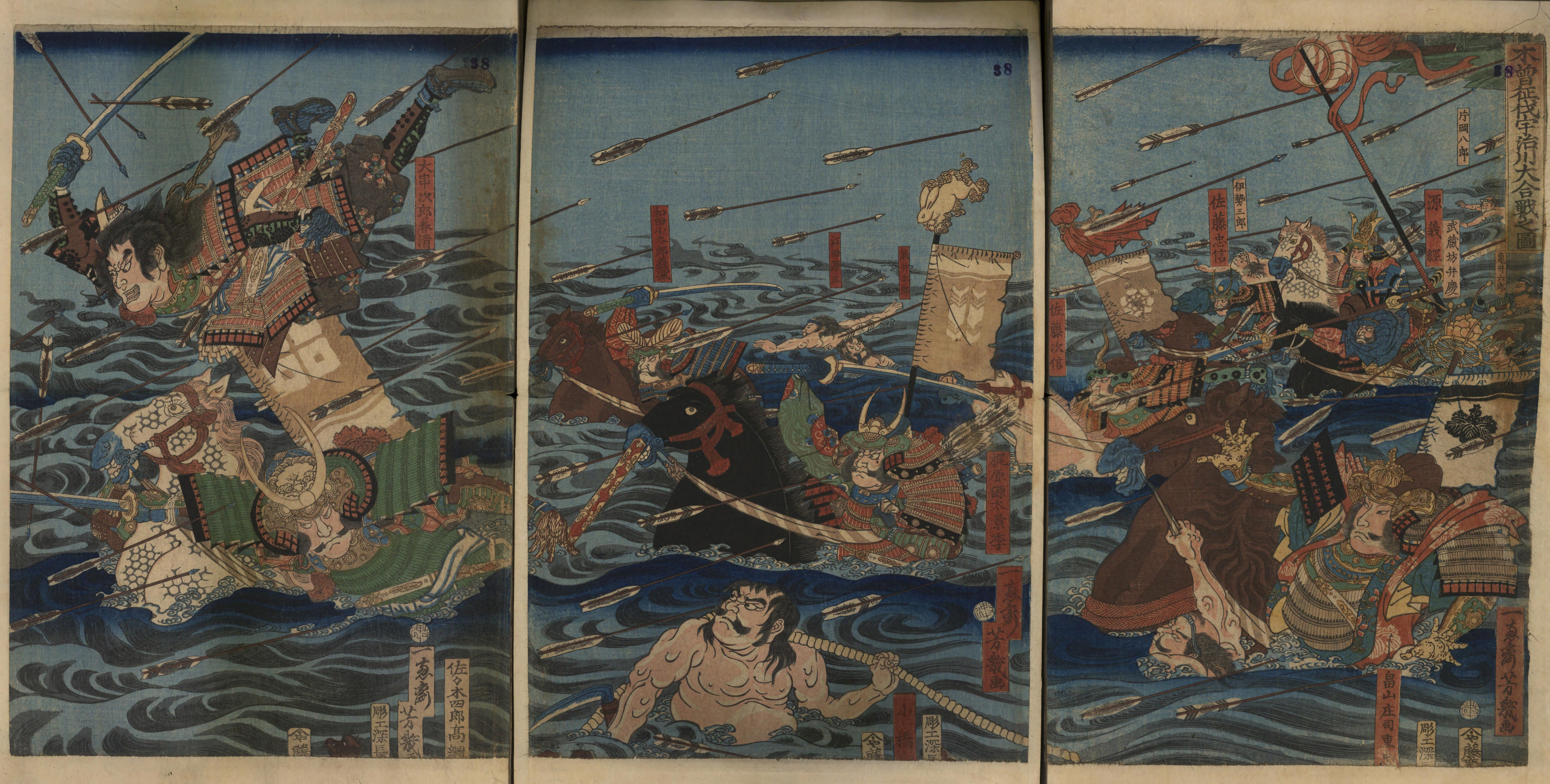

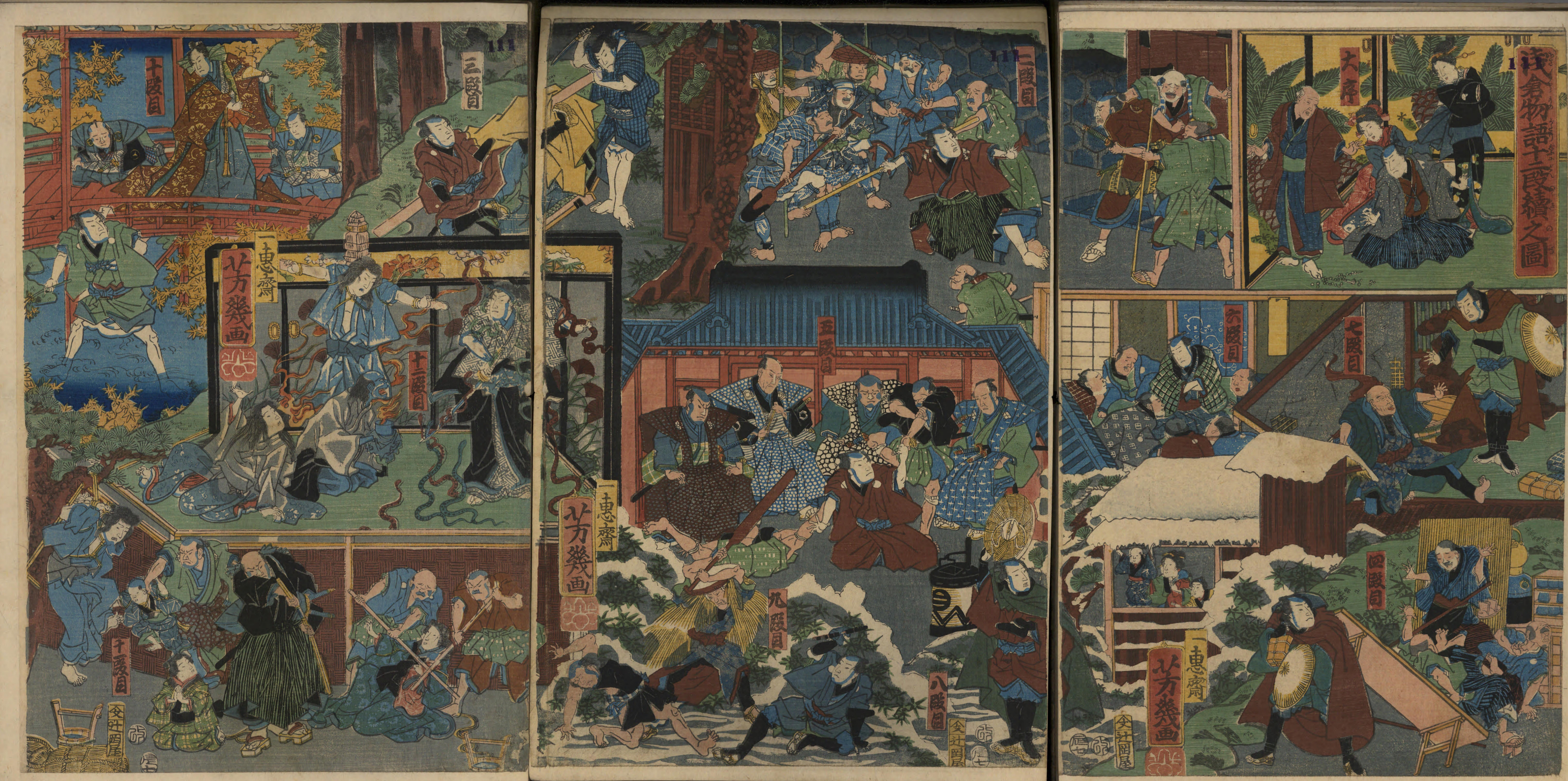

Imayo Nazorae Genji no. 30 (Contemporary Allusion to the Tale of Genji) 1864

== See also ==
- Schools of ukiyo-e artists
- List of ukiyo-e terms
