= Comics Factory =

Imprint of the Russian publisher AST

- Industry: publication
- Genre: manga, Original English-language manga, manhwa
- Founded: 2006
- Headquarters: Yekaterinburg, Russia
- Number of locations: 3
- Area served: Commonwealth of Independent States
- Key people: Feodor Yeremeev (CEO)
- Website: comics-factory.ru

Comics Factory (Russian: Фабрика комиксов, Fabrika komiksov) is a comics imprint of major Russian book publisher AST. It serves as a translator and the licensor of European graphic novels, Japanese manga, Korean manhwa, Taiwan and Hong Kong manhua, Original English-language manga. It also released Russian-language manga of Russian and Ukrainian authors, i.e. Almanac of Russian Manga (MNG). Comics Factory is a part of Publishers Association of Russia (ASKI). It was founded in 2006 by publisher Feodor Yeremeev, translator Igor Bogdanov and film director Pavel Braila. Its headquarters are located in Yekaterinburg, Moscow and Vladivostok.

Comics Factory is known for publishing horror comics and highly controversial titles, such as Suehiro Maruo's ero guro manga Shōjo Tsubaki (aka Mr. Arashi's Amazing Freak Show) and Lunatic Lover's.

== Licenses ==
=== Manga ===
Taimashin; Alien 9; Dolls; Legend of Lemnear; The Hino Horror series: The Bug Boy, Oninbo and the Bugs from Hell, Mystique Mandala of Hell.; Crime and Punishment; Princess Knight; Night Exile (夜の過客) by Matsuri Akino; Hunt for the Thumb (親指さがし) by Kirihito Ayamura; Lament of the Lamb; Plastic Little; Garden by Yokoyama Yuuichi; Chirality	Vampire Princess Miyu; Lunatic Lover's (月的愛人LUNATIC LOVER'S) by Suehiro Maruo; Petshop of Horrors; Constellation of the Imaginary Beast; Figure Maker (ふぃぎゅあめいかー) by Matsuoka Okada; Goth; Mr. Arashi's Amazing Freak Show (少女椿, Shōjo Tsubaki) by Suehiro Maruo; World Embryo; The Music Melody by Marie (Marieの奏でる音楽) by Usamaru Furuya; Paradise Kiss; Hetalia: Axis Powers; Panorama Island (パノラマ島綺譚, Panorama-tō Kidan) by Suehiro Maruo

=== Manhwa ===
Demon Diary; In Dream World (Korean: 인드림월드) by Yoon Jae Ho; Evil'S Return by Jong Kyu-Lee, Hwan Shin; Moon Boy; Memory of the Mask (Korean: 가면의 기억) by Jeong Han Kim; Model; Heroes Lore. Wind of Soltia by Won-sik Yoon; Jack Frost; The Tarot Café; The Legend of Maian; War Angels by Jae-Hwan Kim; The Flower of Evil by Lee Hyeon-sook	Zero; Tokebi World by Lee Young-you & So Hee Park; Faeries' Landing; One Fine Day by Sirial; Witch Buster; Aflame Inferno (Korean: 불꽃의 인페르노) by Lim Dall-young and Kim Kwang Hyun; Raiders (Korean: 레이더스) by JinJun Park; Unbalance x Unbalance; June the Little Queen; One by Vin Lee; Redrum 327 (Korean: 레드럼 327) by Ko Ya-seong

=== Manhua ===
- Divine Melody

== Internet buffet ==
On May 17, 2012, the Comics Factory opened an online buffet where it sells its books, as well as books by the affiliated publishing house «Cabinet Scientist».
