= Another Lady Innocent =

2004 original video animation

フロントイノセント ～もうひとつのレディイノセント～ エピソード (Front Innocent ~Mō Hitotsu no Rēdi Inosento~ Episōdo)
- Genre: Romance, Drama, Hentai, Yuri
- Original video animation
- Directed by: Kinji Yoshimoto; Satoshi Urushihara
- Studio: ARMS+
- Licensed by: NA: Kitty Media
- Released: November 11, 2004

Another Lady Innocent (フロントイノセント, Front Innocent) is the title of a hentai anime directed by Satoshi Urushihara and Kinji Yoshimoto in 2004, based on Urishihara's artbook Lady Innocent, and released in Japan under the title Front Innocent.

== Plot ==
During the Civil War, the powerful landowner Carson had a beautiful young daughter with an innocent heart, Faye. As Faye enjoys an intense sexual relationship with her friend John and her servant girl Sophia, the end of her innocent days draws near. The mysterious Lord Mark has set his eyes on her and will stop at nothing to get her.

== Characters and cast ==
- Faye (フェイ) - Voiced by Kumi Sakuma
- Sophia (ソフィア) - Voiced by Takamori Nao
- John (ジョン) - Voiced by Kazuhiko Inoue
- Eichel (イチェル) - Voiced by Hiromi Hirata
- Aine (アイネ) - Voiced by Shiho Kawaragi
- Mark (マーク) - Voiced by Ryūzaburō Ōtomo
- Michael (マイケル) - Voiced by Ikuya Sawaki

== Reception ==
Carlos/Giancarla Ross of THEM Anime Reviews praised the quality of the animation and the attractive character designs, regarding Another Lady Innocent as an unusually accomplished production within the hentai genre. However, Ross criticized its underdeveloped plot, recycled animation and frequently absurd situations, noting that the principal antagonist received little attention outside the preview for the unproduced second episode. Ross acknowledged that the favorable assessment rested almost entirely on the strength of the animation.

Writing in the third edition of The Anime Encyclopedia (2015), Jonathan Clements and Helen McCarthy also criticized the narrative's lack of coherence, questioning the presence of a European aristocratic title in the setting of the American Civil War. They identified similar storytelling weaknesses in Satoshi Urushihara's earlier works, including Legend of Lemnear and Plastic Little, while praising his distinctive rendering of skin tones in his depictions of female nudity.
