= Japonica Polonica Fantastica =

Polish publishing company

J. P. Fantastica Shin Yasuda
- Company type: Sole proprietorship
- Industry: Publishing
- Founded: 1996
- Founder: Shin Yasuda
- Headquarters: Mierzyn
- Area served: Poland
- Key people: Shin Yasuda, Andrzej Kownacki
- Products: manga
- Website: https://jpf.com.pl/

Japonica Polonica Fantastica, also known as JPF, is the oldest Polish manga publisher, founded in 1996 in Olecko. The first titles (Aż do nieba, Czarodziejka z Księżyca [volumes 1–8]) were translated by JPF's founder, Shin Yasuda. At the end of 1998, Rafał "Kabura" Rzepka took over the role of translator. In 2006 the publishing house moved to Mierzyn near Szczecin, Poland. Currently, translators: Paweł Dybała, Michał Żmijewski, Urszula Knap and Monika Nowicka are responsible for translating manga.

== Publishing policy ==
Manga published by JPF have varying release schedules. They include biweekly (some Dragon Ball volumes), monthly (e.g. Czarodziejka z Księżyca, Naruto), bimonthly (e.g. Tajemnica przeszłości, Fullmetal Alchemist) and quarterly (e.g. Akira). Most of the comics have a pocket format (close to B6), although it is not the rule. Some come with so-called "boxy" - boxes for singular volumes (e.g. Legend of Lemnear, Neon Genesis Evangelion) or for several parts of a given series (e.g. six boxes for nineteen volumes of Akira). JPF's manga also vary in layout - most series retain the Japanese page order (original layout), however some present a mirror image of the original (left-to-right page layout).

== Titles published ==
=== Manga ===
- .hack//Bransoleta Zmierzchu
- 7 Miliardów Igieł
- Abara
- Akira
- All You Need Is Kill
- Angel Sanctuary
- Another
- Atak Tytanów
- Atak Tytanów - Bez żalu
- Aż do nieba
- Battle Angel Alita
- Berserk
- Black Paradox
- Blame!
- Bleach
- Blue Heaven
- Było ich jedenaścioro
- Chirality
- Chobits
- City Hunter
- Cowboy Bebop
- Crying Freeman
- Czarodziejka z Księżyca
- Death Note
- D.N.Angel
- Doubt
- Dr. Slump
- Dragon Ball
- Drifters
- Fullmetal Alchemist
- Fushigi Yuugi
- Ghost in the Shell
- Ghost in the Shell 2
- Ghost in the Shell 1.5
- Gra w króla
- Green Blood
- Goth
- Gyo
- Hasło brzmi: Sailor V
- Heat
- Hellsing
- Hideout
- Hiroki Endo - krótkie historie
- Initial D
- Judge
- Klan Poe
- Kobato.
- Legend of Lemnear
- Magiczni Wojownicy – Slayers
- Mobile Suit Gundam The Origin
- Mobile Suit Gundam Thunderbolt
- Mobile Suit Gundam Unicorn: Bande Dessinée
- Mój drogi bracie...
- Naruto
- Neon Genesis Evangelion
- Oh! My Goddess
- One Piece
- One-Punch Man
- Ouran High School Host Club
- Pieśń Apolla
- Plastic Little
- Pokémon Adventures
- Record of Lodoss War
- Remina - gwiazda piekieł
- RESIDENT EVIL marhawa desire
- Rewolucja według Ludwika
- Róża Wersalu
- Służąca Przewodnicząca
- Souichi i jego głupie klątwy
- Soul Eater
- Tokyo Mew Mew
- Tomie
- Uzumaki
- Vampire Princess Miyu
- Wish
- Wolf's Rain
- Wzgórze Apolla
- X Clamp
