= Maruo =

Maruo (written: 丸尾) is a Japanese surname. Notable people with the surname include:

- Suehiro Maruo (丸尾 末広, born 1956), Japanese manga artist
- Tomoko Maruo (丸尾 知子, born 1966), Japanese voice actress from Japan

== See also ==
- Maruo Station, a railway station in Yamaguchi Prefecture, Japan
