= Yuri Kim =

Yuri Kim may refer to:

== People ==
- Yuri Kim (ambassador) (born 1972), American diplomat
- Kim Yoo-ri (born 1984, Korean: 김유리), South Korean actress
- Kim Yu-ri (1989-2011, Korean: 김유리), South Korean fashion model
- Kim You-ri (born 1987, Korean: 김유리), South Korean track cyclist
- Kim Jong-il (1941-2011), North Korean politician who was born Yuri Irsenovich Kim (Russian: Юрий Ирсенович Ким)

== Fiction ==
- Yuri Kim, character in White Nights 3.98
- Yuri Kim, character in Faeries' Landing

== See also ==
- Yuri (disambiguation)
- Kim (disambiguation)
