= List of Unbalance Unbalance chapters =

Unbalance Unbalance is a Korean manhwa series written by Dall-Young Lim and illustrated by Soo-Hyun Lee. The series focuses on Jin-Ho Myung, a slacker student in his last year of high school, and Hae-Young Nah, a beautiful young woman in her mid-twenties who is revealed to be Jin-Ho's homeroom teacher. The story focuses on the ongoing romantic relationship between the two, as well as other relationships with other girls in Jin-Ho's life as the story progresses.

Unbalance Unbalance began biweekly serialization in Daewon C.I.'s Young Champ magazine on May 30, 2005. The first bound volume was released in South Korea on June 25, 2005 under their Young Comics imprint, and sold ten volumes until January 13, 2012, spanning 82 chapters throughout its run. The series had a long hiatus following the release of the ninth volume, and resumed serialization in Young Champ from October 5, 2010 to October 1, 2011. The manhwa was licensed in North America by Infinity Studios, and released two volumes of the series between January 11, 2007 and December 12, 2007 prior to its closure.

Unbalance Unbalance has been licensed for international releases in a number of languages. It is licensed in France by Tokebi, in Hong Kong, Macau and China by Asia Comics, in Russia by Comics Factory, and in Japan by Kill Time Communications, where it was serialized in Comic Valkyrie. Japanese releases of the series feature unique cover art and uncensored scenes, as well as being localized to better suit Japanese readers. Individual chapters of the series are called Touches.

== Volumes list ==
No.	Original release date	Original ISBN	English release date	English ISBN
1	June 15, 2005	978-89-528-9543-1	January 11, 2007	978-1-59697-144-8
1. "Meeting"; 2. "I Don't Like You"; 3. "I'm Gonna Get You!"; 4. "Caught Red-Handed!"; 5. "My Heart Isn't Ready~"; 6. "I Can't Forgive You..."; 7. "This is Too Much"; 8. "Do You Like It That Much?"
2	September 30, 2005	978-89-252-2733-7	December 12, 2007	978-1-59697-145-5
9. "I'm Sorry..."; 10. "How Much Do You Like Them?"; 11. "This is a Joke, Right?!"; 12. "I'll Take Responsibility!"; 13. "Did We Get Lucky?"; 14. "Then What Are You Looking At?"; 15. "We're Not Even Similar..."; 16. "Her, Bring Her Here."
3	January 31, 2006	978-89-596-3497-2	—	—
17. "You Wanna Come to My House?"; 18. "Girlfriend...?"; 19. "I...to the Teacher?"; 20. "5 Years Younger?!"; 21. "I Think It's Alright"; 22. "You're Very Understanding"; 23. "Then Why Did You Go?"; 24. "Things Do Change..."
4	May 31, 2005	978-89-596-3908-3	—	—
25. "Somehow, I Can't Stop"; 26. "Get Your Hands Off Her, Now!"; 27. "Want Me To Tell You Something?"; 28. "Get On Your Knees!!"; 29. "Scary Bastard"; 30. "I'll Take Care of the Rest"; 31. "Why Are You Looking For Me?"; 32. "Are You Really Strong?"
5	September 2, 2006	978-89-252-3922-4	—	—
33. "Annoying"; 34. "Just What Kinda Bastard Are You?"; 35. "Get Away From Each Other This Instant!"; 36. "WOW~"; 37. "Do Yankees Even Eat Spicy Rice Cakes?"; 38. "Come On Baby~"; 39. "I've Decided Now"; 40. "Exclusive Entrance!"
6	February 28, 2007	978-89-252-2734-4	—	—
41. "Lower Your Tone"; 42. "I Want To Wash Up..."; 43. "Is This Seduction?!"; 44. "That's Right, I Know, Too"; 45. "Identical, Those Girls"; 46. "A Misunderstanding, Right?"; 47. "Already Crossed Over!"; 48. "Video Room~?"
7	June 28, 2007	978-89-252-1404-7	—	—
49. "Nothing's Going On"; 50. "Jealousy?"; 51. "Who's That Bastard?"; 52. "You're Coming Along Too?"; 53. "You're Alright After All"; 54. "Just the Two of Us..."; 55. "Close Your Eyes"; 56. "I'll Do Everything...!"
8	January 29, 2008	978-89-252-1968-4	—	—
57. "So Childish"; 58. "It Might Crumble"; 59. "Most Go For It"; 60. "Why Of All Things...?"; 61. "At the Very Least, Convey The Feelings..."; 62. "I'll Tell Him Myself"; 63. "I Like You, Jin-Ho Myung"; 64. "Even Though You Tried To Kiss..."
9	October 30, 2008	978-89-252-3354-3	—	—
65. "Shall We Do It Once?!"; 66. "You... Be A Teacher Or"; 67. "I Wonder If Jin-Ho Is Well?"; 68. "Something Like That..."; 69. "A Mature Adult's Sensuality"; 70. "Shall We Make A Bet?"; 71. "Are You Going...?"; 72. "Don't Go"
10	January 13, 2012	978-89-252-9364-6	—	—
73. "The Only One"; 74. "Let's Go on a Date, You and I"; 75. "A Place to Return To"; 76. "Everything's Fine, Right?"; 77. "Cause... You're a Good Guy"; 78. "You Must Choose"; 79. "He'll Come Back to Me?"; 80. "Yeah, I'm a Crazy Bitch"; 81. "Goodbye, Jin-Ho"; 82. "Right Now, the Teacher is on Break"
