= Tokonami Station =

Railway station in Ube, Yamaguchi Prefecture, Japan

Tokonami Station 床波駅
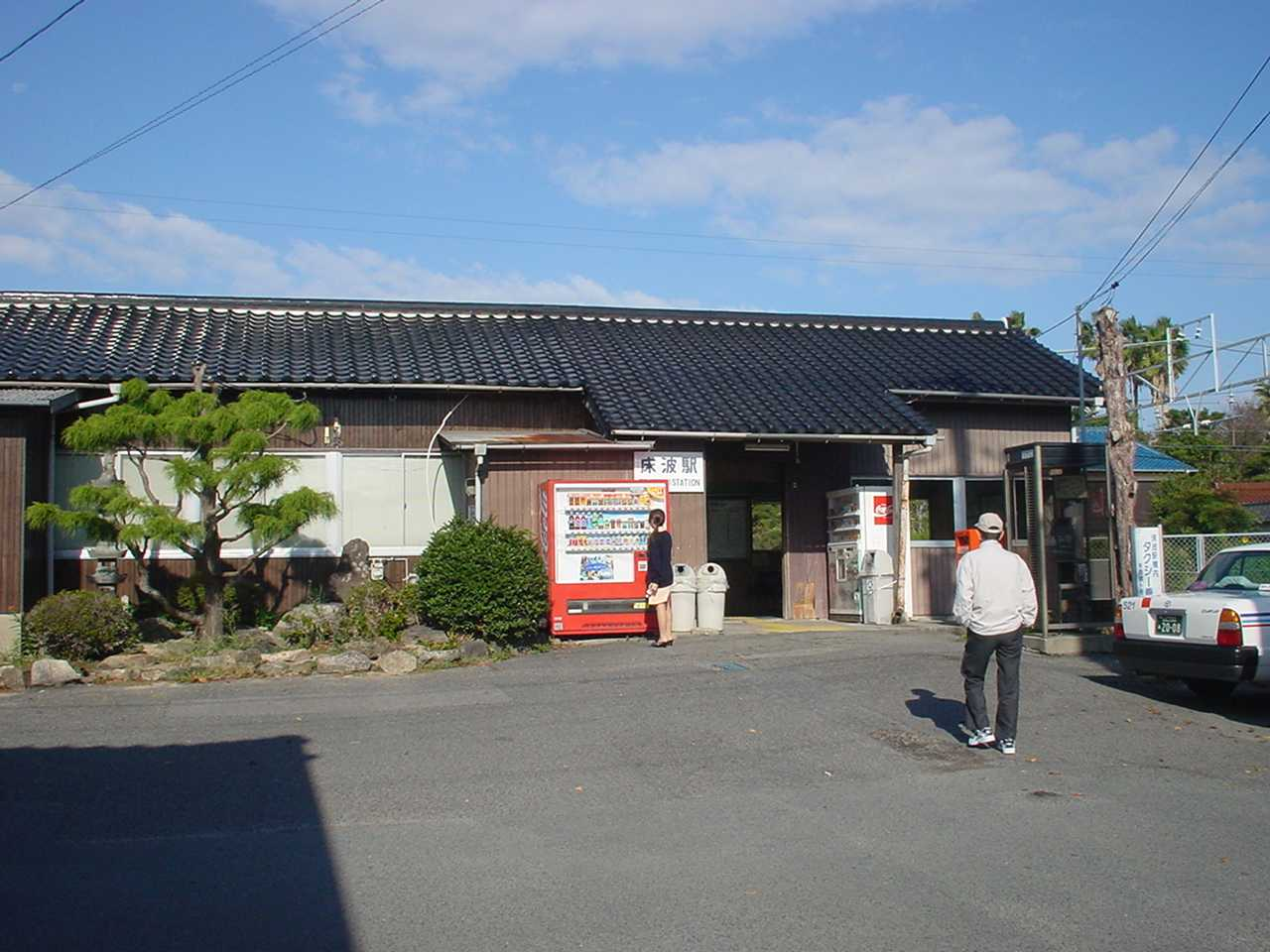
- Tokonami Station in October 2005

General information
- Location: 2-4 Tokonami, Ube-shi, Yamaguchi-ken 755-0153; Japan
- Coordinates: 33°57′9.07″N 131°18′19.71″E
- Owner: West Japan Railway Company
- Operator: West Japan Railway Company
- Line: Ube Line
- Distance: 18.9 km (11.7 miles) from Shin-Yamaguchi
- Platforms: 2 side platform
- Tracks: 2
- Connections: Bus stop

Other information
- Status: Unstaffed
- Website: Official website

History
- Opened: 1 August 1923; 103 years ago

Passengers
- FY2020: 300

Services
Preceding station	JR West	Following station
Maruo towards Shin-Yamaguchi	Ube Line Local	Tokiwa towards Ube
Location
- Location within Yamaguchi Prefecture Location within Japan

Tokonami Station (床波駅, Tokonami-eki) is a passenger railway station located in the city of Ube, Yamaguchi Prefecture, Japan. It is operated by the West Japan Railway Company (JR West).

== Lines ==
Tokonami Station is served by the JR West Ube Line, and is located 18.9 kilometers from the terminus of the line at Shin-Yamaguchi.

== Station layout ==
The station consists of two ground-level unnumbered side platforms connected to the station building by a footbridge. The station is unattended.

=== Platforms ===
station side	■ Ube Line	for Ube-Shinkawa and Inō
opposite side	■ Ube Line	for Shin-Yamaguchi

== History ==
Tokonami was opened on 1 August 1923 when the Ube Railway was extended from Hon-Ajisu Station (present-day Ajisu Station) to Tokonami. The line was nationalized in 1943, becoming the Ube Higashi Line, and was renamed the Ube Line on 1 February 1948. With the privatization of the Japan National Railway (JNR) on 1 April 1987, the station came under the aegis of the West Japan railway Company (JR West).

== Passenger statistics ==
In fiscal 2020, the station was used by an average of 300 passengers daily.

== Surrounding area ==
- Ube City Nishikiwa Elementary School
- Ube City Nishikiwa Junior High School
- Shiratsuchi Beach
- Tokonami Fishing Port

== See also ==
- List of railway stations in Japan
