= Vampire Master Dark Crimson =

Manga series

Vampire Master ダーククリムゾン (Vanpaiya Masutā Dāku Kurimuzon)
- Manga
- Written by: Satoshi Urushihara
- Published by: Kodansha
- Magazine: Monthly Magazine Z
- Original run: August 1999 – December 2001
- Volumes: 3

Vampire Master Dark Crimson (Vampire Master ダーククリムゾン, Vanpaiya Masutā Dāku Kurimuzon) is a Japanese manga series by Satoshi Urushihara which was serialized in Monthly Magazine Z published by Kodansha.

== Plot synopsis ==
The story begins before the dawn of time, when people (identified as Crimsons) have been under control of a deadly foe (identified as Clients), who consider themselves as gods. At the end of the 20th century, the Crimsons still fall under the domain of the Clients, powerful beings who survive by making sacrificial offerings of live human people.

The protagonist is Shion, a child who is half-Client and half-Crimson, i.e. a vampire. He has chosen to fight ceaselessly against the Clients. He is aided by his companion, Rain, a human girl who acts not only as his ally, but also as his source of nourishment and lover. During a mission, Shion meets Helen, a young girl whose family fell victim to the Clients. He makes a blood oath and takes Helen as one of his followers.

== Characters ==
Shion (シオン)

Shion was born in the home world of the Clients, but his human mother escaped with him through a portal created by Shion's father. His mother was later killed by the Clients. As a vampire, Shion cannot sustain himself on normal food, but must instead drink the blood of others. Shion has a pair of black wings that he keeps folded up in his back until needed. He can also turn his nails into claws, and his eyes become cat-like at times. While Shion is half-Client in his biological nature, his actions constantly defy this. The Clients see humans as cattle and have no qualms with raping them. Shion, by contrast, devotes himself only to protecting humans and truly loves Rain and Helen, only drinking their blood when he needs it and giving them true affection when he makes love to them.

Rain

Rain is Shion's first companion since childhood, and his weapon. Rain can transform into armor with special abilities to help Shion in battle. Despite being several years older than Shion, Rain is deeply in love with him and quickly becomes jealous when Shion meets or has to help other women, though she ultimately goes along with his decisions. She also enjoys shopping.

Helen

Helen was orphaned by the Clients and was raised by a church minister. She first met Shion and Rain by accident when the pair were looking for hospitality. She fell in love with Shion but was too shy to act on her feelings. Later, the Clients gained control of her and used her to try to kill Shion. Helen wounded Shion, but regained her senses and offered Shion her blood. She is now Shion's companion with Rain.
Like Rain, Helen can turn into armor for Shion, but does not yet have as many abilities as Rain does. Helen also has the power to detect Clients and their minions, and has an exceptionally beautiful singing voice.

== Publication ==
The manga is published in French by Pika Edition, in Spanish by Planetacomic, in German and Italian by Panini Comics.

In 2002, Germany's Federal Department for Media Harmful to Young Persons classified the story as "endangering" due to the violence and sex scenes in the manga. A censored edition is sold called "Vampire Master", which is restricted to 16 and over, and an uncensored edition for people over 18 is sold as "Dark Crimson".

=== Volume List ===
| No. | Release date | ISBN |
|---|---|---|
| 1 | November 10, 2000 | 978-4063490268 |
First night: The Angel of the Red Death.; Second night: When death falls on the city; Third Night: The Gods of Darkness; Fourth Night: The Offering to Darkness; Fifth Night: The Edge of Tears; Sixth Night: The Black Winged Knight; Night Seven: The Mansion of Sacrifices; Night Eight: Blood Bond; Ninth Night: This Place I Know I
| 2 | May 21, 2003 | 978-4063491272 |
Tenth Night: This Place I Know II; Eleventh Night: Memory of Blood; Twelfth Night: Blood Bond; Thirteenth night: When does the night that never end begin; Fourteenth night: The ceremony; Fifteenth Night: The Vampire's Betrothed; Sixteenth night: The place of the end and the beginning...; Seventeenth Night: Those Born of Darkness; Eighteenth Night: A New Power; Nineteenth Night: Returning from the Darkness
| 3 | October 23, 2003 | 978-4063491494 |
Twentieth Night: A New Beginning; Twenty-first Night: Fallen Knight I; Twenty-second Night: Fallen Knight II; Twenty-third Night: Call of Darkness; Twenty-fourth Night: City in the Mist; Twenty-fifth Night: The Man with the Dark Eyes; Twenty-sixth Night: The Sword of Forgiveness; Twenty-seventh Night: A Much-Loved Name; Twenty-eighth Night: Forbidden City I; Twenty-ninth Night: Forbidden City, II; Thirtieth Night: Two-Faced Mask; Thirty-first Night: Blood Ritual I; Thirty-second Night: Blood Ritual, II

== Reception ==
Manga-News considers the story to be "secondary" to the art in the manga, and the fanservice in the second volume to be over the top, finding the second volume "not worth the money", calling the series "an excuse to show erotic art" and recommending the series as a whole only for fans of the author's art.
