= Shōjo Tsubaki =

Japanese ero guro manga by Suehiro Maruo

- Cover for the 2003 Japanese edition

少女椿
- Genre: Ero guro
- Manga

Mr. Arashi's Amazing Freak Show
- Written by: Suehiro Maruo
- Published by: Seirindō
- English publisher: NA: Blast Books
- Magazine: Garo
- Original run: August 1983 – July 1984
- Volumes: 1
- Anime film

Midori: The Girl in the Freak Show
- Directed by: Hiroshi Harada
- Produced by: Hiroshi Harada
- Written by: Hiroshi Harada
- Music by: J. A. Seazer
- Studio: Mippei Eiga Kiryūkan
- Released: May 2, 1992
- Runtime: 47–56 minutes
- Live-action film

Midori: The Camellia Girl
- Directed by: Torico
- Produced by: Masahiro Tashiro
- Written by: Torico
- Music by: Hitomi Kuroishi; Charan-Po-Rantan
- Studio: Link Rights
- Released: May 21, 2016
- Runtime: 90 minutes
- icon

Shōjo Tsubaki (少女椿, lit. 'The Camellia Girl') is a Japanese manga series written and illustrated by Suehiro Maruo. Serialized in the seinen magazine Garo between August 1983 and July 1984, it was published in a single volume in September 1984 by Seirindō. The story is an ero guro reimagining of Naniwa Seiun's eponymous Shōwa period kamishibai about a young flower seller named Midori who is tricked into working for an abusive freak show.

Revised editions of the manga were published by Seirindō in 1999 and Seirin Kogeisha in 2003, and Blast Books published an English translation in 1993 under the title Mr. Arashi's Amazing Freak Show. The manga was adapted into an anime film by Hiroshi Harada in 1992, released in English as Midori: The Girl in the Freak Show. A live-action film adaptation by Torico, titled Midori: The Camellia Girl, was released in 2016.

Shōjo Tsubaki is considered a classic of Maruo's 1920s-inspired brand of ero guro and remains one of the most acclaimed manga in its genre. The anime film is notorious for its graphic content and elaborate screenings. The live-action film features animated segments and an expanded story with elements from the original kamishibai.

== Plot ==
Born into a poor family in 1938, Midori is a young girl who lives with her bedridden mother after her father abandons them. To make ends meet, Midori drops out of school and begins selling camellia flowers in the city, where she meets a man who tells her that if she is in trouble, she can come visit him. Upon returning home, Midori finds her mother dead and partially eaten by rats. Now an orphan, Midori decides to seek the man who promised to help her.

The man's address turns out to be the Red Cat Circus, a freak show where Midori is forced to work as a servant for the disfigured performers who abuse and rape her. Midori dreams of escaping, but has nowhere else to go and becomes despondent. The Red Cat starts to lose money and its owner, Mr. Arashi, hires Masamitsu, an older man with dwarfism who is proficient in Western magic. Masamitsu takes an immediate liking to Midori and turns her into his assistant and lover, using his magic to protect her from the abuse of the circus troupe.

Masamitsu's show becomes successful, but his relationship with Midori turns controlling and abusive. She witnesses him using his magic to murder a rival performer, and he violently stops her from starting a new life as an actress. After fighting with Midori, Masamitsu's powers spiral out of control during a show and temporally cause all audience members to become grotesquely deformed, prompting the police to shut down the Red Cat. Arashi runs away with the circus money, leaving the performers to their own devices.

Masamitsu apologizes to Midori and asks her to start over. They leave the troupe members, who have grown to become friendly to Midori. Masamitsu asks Midori to wait for him at a bus stop while he buys her food, but on his way, he is stabbed to death by a thief. Midori becomes desperate and tries to find Masamitsu, eventually believing he has abandoned her. She begins to hallucinate that the circus troupe and her parents are mocking her, and she attacks the hallucinations until they disappear. Alone, Midori cries in desperation.

== Characters ==
Midori (みどり)
Voiced by: Minako Naka
Portrayed by: Risa Nakamura
A young girl who becomes a camellia flower seller to help support her mother. After becoming an orphan, Arashi tricks her into working for a freak show where she is abused by the performers. She dreams of escaping the circus and becoming an actress, and finds solace in Masamitsu and his magic. In the live-action film, she is given the surname Hanamura and briefly becomes a famous actress.
Wonder Masamitsu (ワンダー正光, Wandā Masamitsu)
Voiced by: Norihiko Morishita
Portrayed by: Shunsuke Kazama
A middle-aged magician who is an expert in Western magic. His signature trick involves him getting inside a small bottle, which proves very popular with audiences. He has a pedophilic attraction towards Midori and makes her his assistant in the show. Though he has a gentle demeanor, he becomes enraged when people make fun of his dwarfism.
Koijirō Arashi (嵐 鯉治郎, Arashi Koijirō)
Voiced by: Keinosuke Okamoto
Portrayed by: Akihiro Nakatani
The boss of the Red Cat freak show, who first appears as a benevolent man but forces Midori to work as a servant and allows her to be abused. Arashi is attracted to young boys and he has a fetish for oculolinctus, which he practices with Kanabun. He seems to care for the troupe, but he ultimately takes the Red Cat's money and abandons the performers.
Muchisute Tokkuriji (徳利児 鞭棄, Tokkuriji Muchisute)
Voiced by: Yoshifumi Nomura
Portrayed by: Daichi Saeki
A disfigured leper with missing arms and a face covered in bandages, resembling a mummy. He performs archery with his feet at the show. Muchisute is a pedophile who prefers young girls to older women, so he abuses Midori, who he claims to have feelings for. Masamitsu uses his magic to kill Muchisute by forcing him to suffocate with dirt.
Akaza the Human Pump (人間ポンプ 赤座, Ningen ponpu Akaza)
Voiced by: Kazuyoshi Hayashi
Portrayed by: Motoki Fukami
A sword-swallowing, one-eyed strongman who enjoys eating, money, and having sex with Benietsu. He can be temperamental, but is usually laid back and goes along with the sadism and fetishes of the troupe. After the Red Cat is disbanded, Akaza looks for another circus that will take him and the other performers.
Benietsu the Snake Woman (蛇女 紅悦, Hebi-onnna Benietsu)
Voiced by: Sanae Katō
Portrayed by: Misaki Morino
A sadistic and promiscuous snake charmer who engages in sex with her fellow troupe members except Arashi, who is indifferent to her advances. Despite also taking part in assaulting Midori both violently and sexually, Benietsu would later defend her and wish her happiness.
Kanabun (カナブン)
Voiced by: Yumiko Takagi
Portrayed by: Takeru
An adolescent with male genitalia who wears both his hair and clothes like a girl and is advertised as a futanari in the freak show, where he performs daring acts such as fire breathing stunts as a cover-up. Kanabun is vain and extremely adversarial towards Midori, even splattering puppies she adopts and tricks her into eating their cooked meat. After Arashi disbands the circus, Kanabun stops antagonizing Midori and starts dressing more like a boy.
Midori's mother (みどりの母, Midori no haha)
Voiced by: Akiko Tanaka
Portrayed by: Miyuki Torii
Midori's mother becomes the sole breadwinner after her husband leaves the family. She eventually falls ill and becomes bedridden, depending on Midori for support. She dies in bed and is eaten from the inside out by rats. Midori misses her parents and asks Masamitsu to let her see them again with his magic.
Midori's father (みどりの父, Midori no chichi)
A middle-aged man with a crew cut and a laborer's look. He is irresponsible and disappeared three years prior, leaving Midori and his wife.

== Development ==
=== Context ===
Cover illustration of Seiun's kamishibai

Shōjo Tsubaki is Suehiro Maruo's adaptation of the eponymous kamishibai 21-volume play by Naniwa Seiun. Seiun's play is a Shōwa period melodrama about Midori, a young girl with a bob haircut who starts to sell camellia flowers on the streets to help her mother after her father disappears. Human traffickers force her to perform in a revue show and as she becomes famous, her parents try to rescue her. The story ends with Midori's family reunited.

Maruo's reimagining utilizes the premise of an ingénue flower seller being trafficked, but replaces the revue show with a freak show circus and retells the story as an ero guro, with depictions of abuse and a tragic ending that heavily deviates from Seiun's story.

=== Production ===
In order to create imagery that would be faithful to the setting of Seiun's kamishibai, Maruo researched different historical materials, such as photo books of Shōwa period Tokyo. According to Hiroshi Harada, these materials show that certain parts of Maruo's version of the story were based on real events.

=== Release ===
Shōjo Tsubaki was serialized in the seinen magazine Garo, comprising eight chapters and a prologue. The first chapter was published on the August 1983 issue and the final chapter was published in July 1984. Seirindō collected all chapters in a single volume in September 1984, and released a revised edition of this volume in 1999. Seirin Kogeisha released a further revision in 2003.

The collected manga was translated to English by Blast Books in 1993 under the title Mr. Arashi's Amazing Freak Show. It was also translated to Italian in 2001 by Coconino Press, Spanish in 2003 by Glénat, French in 2005 by Éditions IMHO, and Russian in 2008 by Comics Factory. The international translations preserve the original title except for the Russian edition, which is based on Blast Books' English title.

== Anime film ==
Cover of the 2006 Ciné Malta DVD of the film

Midori: The Girl in the Freak Show (地下幻燈劇画 少女椿, Chika Gentō Gekiga: Shōjo Tsubaki; lit. 'Underground Projected Dramatic Pictures: The Camellia Girl') is a 1992 Japanese independent semi-animated ero guro fantasy horror drama film written and directed by Hiroshi Harada under the pseudonym of Hisaaki Etsu (絵津久秋, Etsu Hisaaki), whom he presented as a missing filmmaker he worked under. The film adapts Maruo's manga with small additions and rearranged scenes.

=== Production ===
Director Hiroshi Harada was interested in adapting Maruo's manga, but Maruo was dismissive of his ability to do so after other companies had given up on producing an anime version. In 1987, after Harada's insistence, Maruo accepted his offer and provided him with historical materials he had used for the manga.

Because of Harada's personal interest in the themes of bullying, the film has a greater emphasis on abuse and prejudice, and displays more graphic violence than its source material. Due to this, Harada could not find producers to finance the project, so he used his life savings to draw the movie on his own over five years, and therefore the final film consists primarily of paintings and cels held, panned, or zoomed over with music, sound effects, and voice acting.

=== Release ===
Midori: The Girl in the Freak Show premiered in 1992 in a Shinto shrine in Ikebukuro with live theater performances and decor related to the freak show setting, and Harada intended for all screenings to be underground events that incorporated live performances. Due to its graphic content, Eirin, the Japanese film censor board, requested a censored version to be produced in 1994, which premiered internationally in France on that year and continued to be featured in different international festivals without any accompanying performances.

In 2013, the original 16 mm negative of the film was rediscovered in an Imagica warehouse, and Harada's company, Kiryūkan, set out to remaster it. A remaster of the film was completed in 2020 and premiered at Cinema Skhole in Nagoya on January 3rd. A Blu-ray release was planned, but Kiryūkan were not able to find a willing distributor for it.

=== Home media ===
Although Harada has not allowed the film to be distributed on home media in Japan, French company Ciné Malta released the uncensored 1992 version on DVD in 2006 with subtitles in French, English, Spanish, Italian, and German, under the title Midori.

== Live-action film ==
Cover for the theatrical release of the film

Midori: The Camellia Girl (映画 少女椿, Eiga Shōjo Tsubaki; lit. 'The Camellia Girl Movie') is a 2016 ero guro fantasy horror drama film written and directed by Torico. The film combines live-action and animation and is an adaptation of Suehiro's Maruo manga, with an extended final act inspired by Naniwa Seiun's original kamishibai.

=== Production ===
The manga publisher had received complaints about the 1992 anime version, which had increased the graphic violence of the source material, so director Torico promised the production company to tone down its gore. She focused on the potential artistry of gore instead of on its horror, and to keep audiences engaged, she included transitional animation sequences in the film.

Midori: The Camellia Girl was Torico's second feature film. A fan of Suehiro Maruo, she worked with him in order to achieve a colorful aesthetic that Maruo felt would be more true to the real Shōwa period setting, the depictions of which are usually influenced by the sepia tone of its surviving photographs.

The film changed the setting of the story from 1938 to the retrofuturistic 2032, in an alternate timeline where the Shōwa period did not end, and gives the characters of Midori and Masamitsu more background and development. It also includes a new final act inspired by Naniwa Seiun's kamishibai, where Midori briefly becomes a famous actress before the story returns to Maruo's ending.

=== Release ===
Midori: The Camellia Girl premiered in Japan on May 21, 2016, and internationally in Germany in 2017 at the 18th Japan-Filmfest Hamburg.

=== Home media ===
In Japan, the film was released on Blu-ray and DVD in November 2016. In 2020, distributor Midori-Impuls released a limited edition DVD (limited to 1000 copies in total) with Japanese audio and both German and English subtitles in German-speaking Europe, featuring alternative cover art by artists Tomo Hyakutake, Shintaro Kago, and Suehiro Maruo.

== See also ==
- GeGeGe no Kitarō – Another manga and anime franchise with its origins in kamishibai.
- The Golden Bat – Another kamishibai that was later adapted into live-action and anime.
- Belladonna of Sadness – An earlier erotic Japanese film using still paintings and animation.
- Santa Sangre – A surrealist psychological horror film with a similar plot involving the circus theme.
- Freaks - A 1932 pre-Code American horror film focusing on a circus freak show.
