= Unbalance ×2 =

South Korean manhwa series

- Cover of the first English volume of Unbalance Unbalance featuring Hae-Young Nah

언밸런스×2 RR: Eonbaelleonseu×2 MR: Ŏnbaellŏnsŭ×2
- Genre: Romantic comedy, Drama, Slice of life, Harem
- Author: Dall-Young Lim
- Illustrator: Soo-Hyun Lee
- Publisher: (South Korea) Daewon C.I.
- English publisher: (Canada) (United States) Infinity Studios
- Other publishers: (France) Tokebi, Samji (Hong Kong) (Macau) (Taiwan) Asia Comics (Japan) Kill Time Communication (Russia) Comics Factory
- Magazine: (South Korea) Young Champ
- Original run: 2005–2012
- Collected volumes: 10

Unbalance ×2 (Korean: 언밸런스×2) is a Korean manhwa series written by Lim Dall-Young and illustrated by Soo-Hyun Lee. The series focuses on Jin-Ho Myung, a high school senior, and his romantic relationship with his homeroom teacher, Hae-Young Nah. The manhwa began biweekly serialization in Young Champ magazine in May 2005, and the first volume was released on June 15, 2005 by Daewon C.I. The series had a long hiatus following the release of the ninth volume, and resumed serialization in Young Champ from October 2010 to October 2011. The tenth and final volume was released by Daewon C.I. on January 13, 2012. Unbalance Unbalance was licensed in North America by Infinity Studios, which released the first volume on January 11, 2007. A drama CD was released in Japan in September 2009.

== Story ==
Jin-Ho Myung returns a wallet and cell phone to a beautiful young woman (Hae-Young Nah) in a book shop, little realizing that she would notice that he has already (rather presumptuously) taken 7000 won to buy a book he really wanted. The woman in question is understandably rather upset but decides to consider the money as a loan, which she expects to be paid back.

On the first day of the new school year, he learns, to his horror, that the very same woman is to be his new homeroom teacher. The bad news for Jin-Ho is that she remembers their previous encounter very well.

After a series of misadventures, Jin-Ho and Hae-Young become friends. Eventually, Jin-Ho confesses his feelings for Hae-Young, who is also attracted to him, but is apprehensive because she is older than him and the fact that she is his teacher. All this happens despite the fact that Ji-Soo (Jin-Ho's classmate and Class President) and Jae-Kyung (Jin-Ho's senior and the founder of the school Film Club) are secretly in love with Jin-Ho. Carrie, Hae-Young's half sister from England enters their lives and makes a move on Jin-Ho to taunt her sister. She quickly understands Jin-Ho's love for Hae-Young and supports them.

Hae-Young becomes increasingly conflicted with her feelings for Jin-Ho and dares him to steal her heart by the end of the month, or else she shall leave his life forever. Meanwhile Jae-Kyung breaks up with her boyfriend and resolves to re-enter Jin-Ho's life. She is aware of Hae-Young's love for Jin-Ho and tells her she will steal him. Anguished, Hae-Young admits her love for Jin-Ho who accepts.

Currently, Jin-Ho declines Jae-Kyung's confession of love. Jae-Kyung sorrowfully accepts Jin-Ho's decision on loving Hae-Young instead of her. As Jin-Ho leaves the Film Studies Club room, Jae-Kyung cries in total depression. She soon has a mental breakdown, in which she wears her high school uniform and goes back to school, reminiscing her old days as the president of the Film Studies Club and thinking about Jin-Ho. Jin-Ho soon learns about Jae-Kyung's condition and she is rushed to the hospital. In hopes of bringing her back to normal, the doctor suggests Jin-Ho to support and love her in order for her to recover much faster. Hae-Young later meets Jin-Ho and invites him to her house for a date. Jin-Ho, knowing Jae-Kyung's mental condition, abruptly turns her down much to Hae-Young's dismay. Jin-Ho shares his woes to Carrie, stating that while he certainly loves Hae-Young, he cannot abandon Jae-Kyung because of her mental breakdown. Later Carrie reveals the whole situation to Hae-Young. She visits Jin-Ho and tells him she is willing to fulfil his desire. Jin-Ho once more turns her down and Hae-Young angrily breaks up with him. However, she gets upset and starts sobbing.

Following her break-up with Jin-Ho, Hae-Young decides to resign from her post after the first semester of school. She decides to leave Jin-Ho's life for good. Ji-Soo later asks if Jin-Ho was aware of this fact and if Jae-Kyung was involved, but Jin-Ho denies the involvement of Jae-Kyung and claims that he no longer loves Hae-Young. Ji-Soo later goes to see Jae-Kyung where she overhears her phone call, saying that she had already recovered. After hearing the phone call, Ji-Soo confronts Jae-Kyung, who claims that she doesn't know Ji-Soo, who beats her out of anger for tricking Jin-Ho.

Hae-Young eventually goes to the airport to leave Korea, which she confesses to Caroline that she's happy to be her sister. When she arrives in the UK, she is confronted by Jin-Ho who hands her a device resembling an iPad containing a video message from Jae-Kyung. Jae-Kyung wishes well for Hae-Young and Jin-Ho. Hae-Young tearfully reconciles with Jin-Ho and the two kiss.

== Characters ==
The characters' original names are shown on the left, while their names from the Japanese version appear on the right. Only Carrie, Ami, and Mi-Na retain their names in both versions.

=== Main characters ===
Jin-Ho Myung (Korean: 명진호; RR: Myeong Jin-ho; MR: Myŏng Chin-ho) / Kenichi Kando (神門 健一, Kando Ken'ichi)
Voiced by: Tomokazu Sugita (Drama CD)
Jin-Ho is a student in his final year at Arim High School and finds himself a student in Hae-Young's class. Seemingly caring little for schoolwork, he has been known to go to the nurse's office to sleep, watch erotic movies in school, and complete mathematics tests (generally unsuccessfully) using pure guesswork. In middle school, it appears he was something of a delinquent who got into many fights, becoming quite skilled along the way. When it comes to his teachers, friends, or family, he takes their physical abuse and, in most cases, takes the blame and punishments simply because he can (especially early on in the story). This has been a source of concern to his family, or at the very least for his aunt who usually acts more like an older sister than a parent figure. However, he can also become focused if something interests him, like film, which caused him to be the co-founder and eventually the president of the school's Film Studies Club.

He lives with his aunt and father and there are suggestions in the story that he is estranged or separated from his mother, a possible cause for some of his rather more reckless behavior. His sometimes rather cavalier attitude leads him into a number of compromising situations with his teacher. These instances have led Hae-Young to fall in love with him.

Hae-Young Nah (Korean: 나해영; RR: Na Hae-yeong; MR: Na Hae-yŏng) / Elina Takanashi (高梨 エリナ, Takanashi Erina)
Voiced by: Kikuko Inoue (Drama CD)
A beautiful woman in her mid-20s, Hae-Young teaches mathematics at Arim High and also acts as the homeroom teacher for class 3-2. She lives with her sister and niece in an apartment block quite close to Jin-Ho's. Her father's unexpected departure from her life when she was young has had a huge impact on her. Even though she is extremely attractive and was apparently popular (and pursued) throughout her school life, she has become very guarded around men, feeling unable to trust or form relationships with them. Consequently, she is still a virgin and even shares her first kiss with Jin-Ho during the course of the story. She also seems to be following her mother's career path: she was also a teacher and became the district superintendent before retirement. There have been several instances where she acts rather childishly. In one instance, she takes out her (misplaced) anger on Jin-Ho after being reminded of her absentee father by a news article, and she repeatedly slapped him hard enough to give him a nosebleed because he didn't think he should apologize for a prior incident. Despite Hae-Young trying to be strict and meticulous in her work and home life, she has found herself in increasingly compromising and desperate situations with Jin-Ho. Much to her own initial displeasure and continuing discomfort, she finds herself developing increasingly romantic feelings for him, so much that during the course of the MT (Membership Training) trip, they kissed several times.

=== Supporting characters ===
Young-Gi Cha (Korean: 차영기; RR: Cha Yeong-gi; MR: Ch'a Yŏng-gi) / Hiro Hanai (花井 尋, Hanai Hiro)
Voiced by: Hiroaki Miura (Drama CD)
Jin-Ho's friend and classmate. They have been placed together in the same class for the previous six years. Like his friend, he is skilled at fighting. It has been implied that he likes Ji-Soo; he is very protective of her and careful of how she perceives him. Young-Gi also has a strong sense of justice and, despite his tall, athletic build, prefers to find the most peaceful resolutions to otherwise violent confrontations. His first encounter with Jin-Ho was back in middle school when Jin-Ho, who was a notable delinquent at the time, was harassing another student; the two fought and soon afterwards became close friends.

Ji-Soo Ha (Korean: 하지수; RR: Ha Ji-su; MR: Ha Chi-su) / Mai Sugihara (杉原 麻衣, Sugihara Mai; English manhwa: Ji-Sue)
Voiced by: Mai Nakahara (Drama CD)
The senior class president as well as now being the president of the Student Council. She is hardworking, studious, performs well and is also popular. She appears to have liked Jin-Ho ever since her freshmen year of high school, when he helped her make origami flowers. He does not feel the same way towards her, though at one point he does suddenly notice that she is attractive.
In the After Story, Jin-Ho reveals to Hae-Young that he had always suspected Ji-Soo having feelings for him. At one point, Jin-Ho wanted to date her, but kept quiet because he was aware of Young Ki having feelings for Ji-Soo. He admits that if he had actually dated Ji-Soo, he would probably end up betraying her for Hae-Young.

Ami Eun (Korean: 은아미; RR: Eun A-mi; MR: Ŭn A-mi) / Ami Nagumo (南雲 亜美, Nagumo Ami)
Voiced by: Mai Goto (Drama CD)
She is a senior and a friend of Ji-Soo. She is shy and quiet at school, where she often reads yaoi manhwa. She is one of the first to find out about Hae-Young and Jin-Ho's complicated out-of-school relationship. When Jin-Ho learns that she is the one who told Ji-Soo about his situation with Hae-Young, he attempts to confront her. During this face-off, she threatens to publicly reveal the relationship, which would be likely to get Jin-Ho suspended and, even worse for him, ruin Hae-Young’s career. She even forces Jin-Ho to kneel in front of her without a second thought so as to exert her power over him, and gets pleasure out of it. She seems to not like men in general, and also appears to dislike Jin-Ho in particular. It transpires that this was an empty threat on Ami's part, since she herself is also in love with Hae-Young; she even tries to force herself on her teacher, who then turns her down.

Caroline Pendleton Korean: 캐롤라인; RR: Kaerollain; MR: K'aerollain) / Caroline Takanashi (キャロライン 高梨, Kyarorain Takanashi)
Voiced by: Ayako Kawasumi (Drama CD)
Nicknamed "Carrie", she is a Eurasian (half Korean/half British) woman who has recently arrived in Korea. She has lived in the United States for a while, learning the French martial art of savate. She has come to Korea because she is curious about her father's homeland and her siblings, who turn out to be Hae-Young and Hae-Jung. When she first arrives, she lives in a temporarily motel while her father arranges for her to stay with her half-sisters for about a month. She has been employed at Arim High as an English teacher and an assistant homeroom teacher under Hae-Young. It is revealed by Hae-Jung that her Korean name is Hae-Eun Nah. Whether she changed her name while living in America or while living in Britain remains unknown.

Her first encounter with Jin-Ho, like her half-sister's, is not entirely without its troubles, ending in a fight and injury (which she somehow gave herself as Jin-Ho did not actually hit her) for her. Her opinion of Jin-Ho changes however when he escorts her back to her motel room and shows concern for her well-being. As she has no full siblings, she appears to harbor a strong desire for a warm relationship with her half-sisters, though this is complicated somewhat by their rather cold and distant relationship with their father. She expresses great romantic interest in Jin-Ho and has challenged Hae-Young Nah to see who can first win his heart. Although this was originally just a ploy to provoke her half-sister, Jin-Ho's rather chivalrous inner nature made her realize she might actually fall for him. She spends the remainder of the Manhwa supporting Jin-Ho and Hae-Young's romance.

Jae-Kyung Park (Korean: 박재경; RR: Bak Jae-gyeong; MR: Pak Chae-gyŏng) / Akane Honda (本多 茜, Honda Akane)
Voiced by: Omi Minami (Drama CD)
She is a college freshman and a friend of Jin-Ho's. In her high school days (where it is revealed she had short hair), she was the co-founder and former president of the Film Studies Club (now passed on to Jin-Ho) as well as the former president of the Student Council (which is now succeeded by Ji-Soo). Even though she flirts with him, Jin-Ho feels comfortable enough with her to confide his girl problems to her. There are also hints that Jin-Ho may have had rather deeper feelings for her while she was in high school, and seems that Jin-Ho has been rather more distant with girls since she left. There are implications that Jae-Kyung has romantic inclinations towards Jin-Ho, most prominent when she breaks up with her boyfriend and seeking out Jin-Ho for comfort, and acts very coldly towards Hae-Young after she finds out he was waiting for her. Caroline even states that Jae-Kyung is one of Hae-Young's rivals.

It is later revealed that long before Hae-Young's arrival, Jin-Ho was best friends with Jae-Kyung and had a crush on her. Jae-Kyung initially didn't return his feelings, but afterwards she secretly changed her mind. Before graduating from high-school, Jae-Kyung tried to seduce Jin-Ho, but he rejected the idea, because he was interested in a meaningful relationship and not an affair. The two parted ways but remained good friends.

Afterwards, Jae-Kyung dated a guy but later broke up with him and decides to have a proper relationship with Jin-Ho. She is displeased to discover that Jin-Ho is in love with Hae-Young. Jae-Kyung threatens to steal Jin-Ho from Hae-Young, prompting the latter to desperately confess her love for Jin-Ho. Jin-Ho meets Jae-Kyung to politely decline her feelings and leaves. Jae-Kyung is devastated and develops temporary anterograde amnesia. Feeling responsible for her, Jin-Ho is forced to break up with Hae-Young. Jae-Kyung recovers but decides not to tell Jin-Ho so that he will accept her affections. Ji-Soo discovers Jae-Kyung's ploy and starts slapping her for deceiving Jin-Ho. Jae-Kyung relents and allows Jin-Ho to reunite with Hae-Young.

== Media ==
=== Manhwa ===
Unbalance Unbalance began biweekly serialization in Daewon C.I.'s Young Champ magazine on May 30, 2005. The first bound volume was released in South Korea on June 25, 2005 under their Young Comics imprint, and sold ten volumes until January 13, 2012, spanning 82 chapters throughout its run. The series had a long hiatus following the release of the ninth volume, and resumed serialization in Young Champ from October 5, 2010 to October 1, 2011. The manhwa was licensed in North America by Infinity Studios, and released two volumes of the series between January 11, 2007 and December 12, 2007 prior to its closure.

Unbalance Unbalance has been licensed for international releases in a number of languages. It is licensed in France by Tokebi, in Hong Kong, Macau and in China by Asia Comics, in Russia by Comics Factory, and in Japan by Kill Time Communication, where it was serialized in Comic Valkyrie from the November 2010 issue (published on September 27, 2010) to the January 2012 issue (published on November 28, 2011). The Japanese releases feature unique cover art designs and uncensored scenes, as well as being localized to better suit Japanese readers. In a Japanese interview with Dall-Young Lim, the author of the series, he claims the reasons for the unedited scenes is due to Korea's stricter censorship policy keeping him from doing so. He also claims he has much more freedom in terms of mature content with the Japanese version than with the Korean version.

=== Drama CD ===
A drama CD produced by Indies Mega was released in Japan on September 26, 2009. It featured Tomokazu Sugita and Kikuko Inoue as the voices of Kenichi Kando (Jin-Ho Myung) and Elina Takanashi (Hae-Young Nah), respectively.

== Sequels and other series ==
A spin-off sequel Unbalance ×2: After Story (언밸런스X2 애프터스토리) was serialized in Comic GT in 2019. It explores Jin-Ho and Hae-Young's relationship after reconciliation. Jin-Hi and Ji-Soo pretend to date to prevent Hae-Young from being suspected. It ends with Jin-Ho and Hae-Young reaffirming to continue their relationship.

Unbalance ×3 or Unbalance Triangle manhwa series was serialized in Comic GT. The story is by Lim in 2015, with art by Lee Soo-Hyun. The series focuses on a relationship between a guy and his older sister who gets amnesia.
