= Satoshi Urushihara =

Japanese manga artist and illustrator (born 1966)

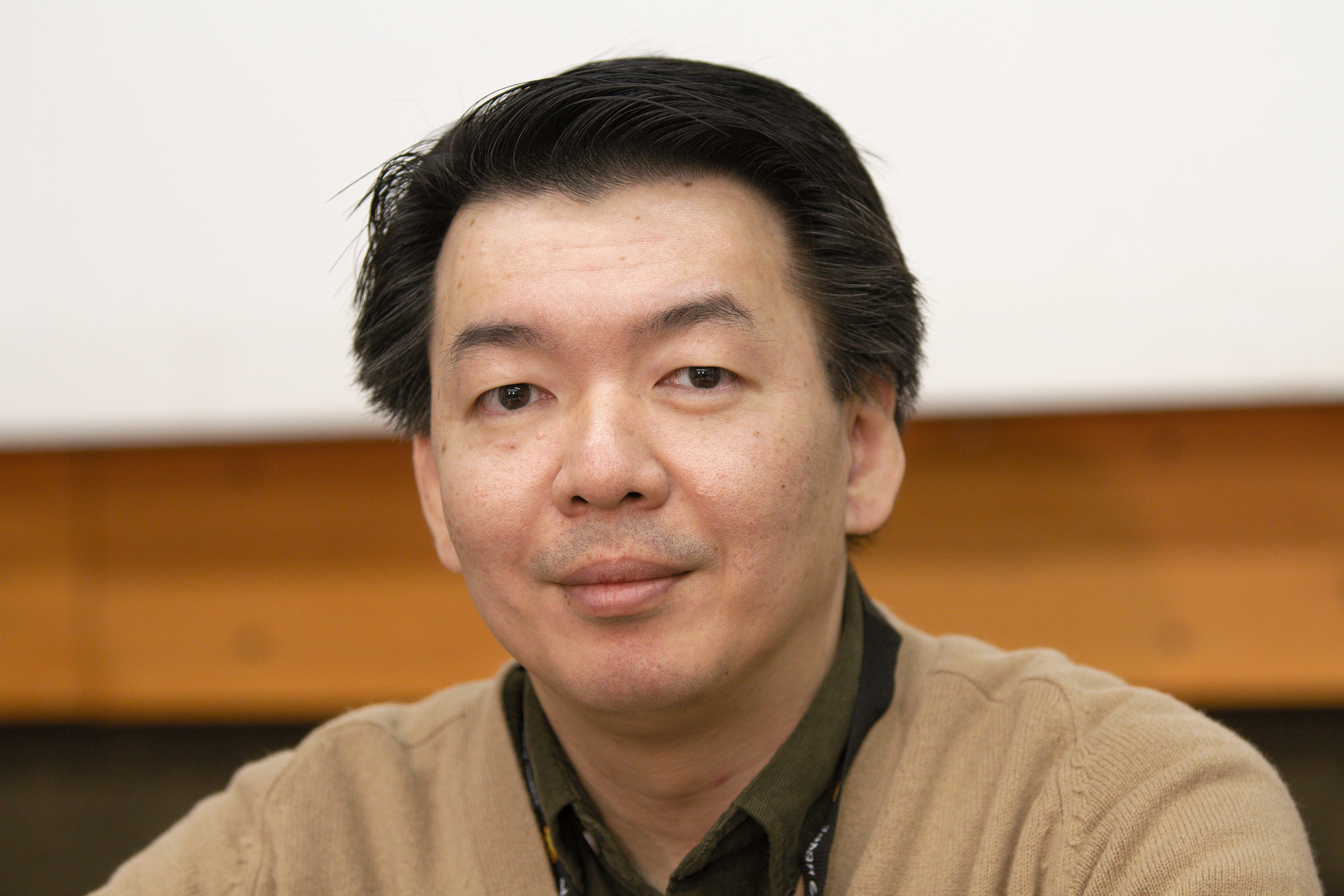
- At Japan Expo Sud 2010, Marseille, France (2010-02-20)
- Born: February 9, 1966 (age 60); Hiroshima Prefecture, Japan
- Other name: Master of Breasts
- Occupations: Manga artist, Illustrator
- Known for: Legend of Lemnear; Plastic Little; The Transformers: The Movie; Growlanser; Langrisser
- Website: blog.livedoor.jp/uruchi1

Satoshi Urushihara (うるし原 智志) (pen name) or Urushihara Satoshi (漆原 智志; (real name) born February 9, 1966), the "Master of Breasts", is a Japanese manga artist and illustrator known for his distinctive style of beautiful characters. His work is the basis for anime such as Plastic Little and Legend of Lemnear, and appears in the Langrisser and Growlanser series of tactical role-playing video games.

== Early life ==
Satoshi Urushihara was born on February 9, 1966, in Hiroshima Prefecture, Japan. He met fellow illustrator Kinji Yoshimoto in 1983 while attending a technical high school in Miyajima. He effectively started his career in manga and anime when he was selected as animator for the animated movie Jungle Boy Kenya (少年ケニヤ, Shōnen Keniya), produced by Kadokawa Haruki Jimusho and Toei Animation, a position he was actively looking for.

== Anime and manga career ==
After graduating from high school in 1984, he was employed by Toei Animation and after gaining some experience he was promoted to key animator with the animated TV series The Transformers and provided mechanical designs for The Transformers: The Movie.

The next year, Urushihara became a freelancer, working mainly in original video animations. It was his work with the OVA Megazone 23 Part II (1986) that made him recognized by producers of AIC. This lead him to be the character designer and animation supervisor of the adult-restricted OVA White Shadow (ホワイトシャドウ) (New Cream Lemon series, episode 2) released in 1987. This work was his debut as character designer, although at the time of the original OVA release, his name was kept secret and afterwards announced on the official website of Earthwork. In 1990, he was the character designer and chief production supervisor for the seventh episode of Bubblegum Crisis called "Double Vision".

In 1990, along with illustrators Kinji Yoshimoto and Yoshihiro Kimura, he created the production company Earthwork.

== Works ==
=== Manga ===
- Legend of Lemnear (1991–1993)
- Plastic Little: Captain's Log (1994)
- Chirality (1995–1997)
- Eidron Shadow (1999–2002)
- Mirowoire: The Mirror Within a Mirror
- Ragnarock City (2000–2001)
- Ryoujoku (also known as Love Intermission)
- Vampire Master Dark Crimson (2000)
- RC Twins (enclosed within the "Sigma" artbook) (2006)

=== Artbooks ===
- Satoshi Urushihara Cell Works. ISBN 4-89601-086-8. (1994/05/01) (Note: title is in English.)
- Urushihara Satoshi Illustration Collection Langrisser Complete I II III (うるし原智志イラスト集ラングリッサー・コンプリート I II III, Urushihara Satoshi Irasuto Shū Langrisser Complete I II III). ISBN 4-89389-126-X. (1996/10)
- Urushihara Satoshi Illustration Collection Venus (うるし原智志イラスト集VENUS, Urushihara Satoshi Irasuto Shū Venus). ISBN 4-05-601681-X. (1997/11/06)
- Urushihara Satoshi Illustration Collection Legend of Langrisser (うるし原智志イラスト集レジェンド・オブ・ラングリッサー, Urushihara Satoshi Irasuto Shū Legend of Langrisser). ISBN 4-05-601955-X. (1998/08/14)
- Growlanser Character Collection (グローランサーキャラクターコレクション). ISBN 4-8402-1918-4. (2002/08)
- Urushihara Satoshi Illustration Collection Love (Naked Dance) (うるし原智志イラスト集LOVE(裸舞), Urushihara Satoshi Irasuto Shū Love (Hadaka Mai)). ISBN 4-05-603122-3. (2003/04)
- Growlanser IV—Wayfarer of the time—Official Special Fan Book (グローランサー4‐Wayfarer of the time‐公式スペシャルファンブック). ISBN 4-7973-2547-X. (2003/12) (Note: title is in English, with katakana transliteration.)
- Urushihara Satoshi Illustration Collection U:Collection (うるし原智志イラスト集 U: COLLECTION, Urushihara Satoshi Irasuto Shū U:Collection). ISBN 4-06-364533-9. (2003/12/17)
- Growlanser IV—Wayfarer of the time—Character & Scenario Collection (グローランサー4—Wayfarer of the time—キャラクター&シナリオコレクション). ISBN 4-8402-2668-7. (2004/06) (Note: title is in English, with katakana transliteration.)
- Growlanser IV Return: Official Visual Fan Book (グローランサー4リターン 公式ビジュアルファンブック). ISBN 4-86176-113-1. (2005/03)
- Urushihara Satoshi Illustration Collection Φ [Phi] (うるし原智志イラスト集 Φ, Urushihara Satoshi Irasuto Shū Φ). ISBN 4-05-603961-5. (2005/04/02)
- Urushihara Satoshi visual works ~[From] Front Innocent Vol. 1~ (うるし原智志ビジュアルワークス~フロントイノセントvol.1より~, Urushihara Satoshi visual works ~Front Innocent Vol. 1 yori~). ISBN 4-7577-2496-9. (2005/10/03)
- Urushihara Satoshi Illustration Collection Σ [Sigma] (うるし原智志イラスト集Σ, Urushihara Satoshi Irasuto Shū Σ). ISBN 4-05-604485-6. (2006/06/30)
- Reira Urushihara Satoshi Illustration Collection (麗裸うるし原智志イラスト集, Reira Urushihara Satoshi Irasuto Shū). ISBN 4-05-605670-6. (2009/11/30)

=== Anime ===
- Another Lady Innocent (2004; Japanese title Front Innocent)
- Riding Bean (1989; vehicle animation designer)
- Crying Freeman (Production Supervision (vol. 3 & 4))
- Growlanser IV (2003; Character Design)
- Legend of Lemnear (1989)
- Plastic Little (1994)
- Bubblegum Crisis (Chief Production Supervisor and Guest Character Designer (Episode 7: "Double Vision" (1990)))
- Record of Lodoss War (OVA; Assistant Animator, Production Supervision (Ep. 5))
- Ikki Tousen: Dragon Destiny (Ending Animation Character Design)

=== Video games ===
- Langrisser series
- Growlanser series
- Cybernator (Assault Suits Valken in Japan)
- Next King: Millennial Kingdom of Love

=== Other works ===
- Provided artwork for the Street Fighter II drama CDs, Mad Revenger, and Portrait of the Magician
- Satoshi Urushihara Posterbox
- Transformers series
- Tenma Magazine covers
- In his artbook Nostalgic Heroines, Urushihara creates a series of images that involves characters, mainly female, from well-known popular anime series including Neon Genesis Evangelion, Martian Successor Nadesico, and Dirty Pair.
