= The Strange Tale of Panorama Island =

Japanese manga

- Volume cover

パノラマ島綺譚 (Panorama-tō Kitan)
- Manga
- Written by: Suehiro Maruo
- Published by: Enterbrain
- English publisher: Last Gasp
- Imprint: Beam Comics
- Magazine: Comic Beam
- Published: February 25, 2008
- Volumes: 1

The Strange Tale of Panorama Island (Japanese: パノラマ島綺譚, Hepburn: Panorama-tō Kitan) is a Japanese manga written and illustrated by Suehiro Maruo and based on a 1926 novella of the same name [ja] by Edogawa Ranpo. The manga was published in English by Last Gasp on July 1, 2013.

== Plot ==
Hitomi Hirosuke, a struggling novelist, writes a story titled "The Tale of RA" about a protagonist who suddenly gains wealth and constructs a utopian paradise where everyone can live in their idyllic fantasies and hedonistic desires are indulged in blissful pleasure. His editor informs him that his wealthy boarding school friend, Genzaburo Komoda, who is the son of a renowned industrial magnate, has died. Hitomi forms a plan in order to impersonate the dead Genzaburo, who looks exactly like him, to gain his wealth and fortune. He fakes his suicide and exhume Genzaburo's corpse, hiding it and pulling out his own tooth to match Genzaburo's false one. When Hitomi is discovered in Genzaburo's hometown, a doctor attributes his resurrection to catalepsy and Hitomi successfully passes for Genzaburo.

After he takes over all aspects of the industrialist's life, Hitomi, who still daydreaming about his desire to build a paradise, travels to Kagoshima where he convinces his family advisor, Tsunoda, of his plan to build an idyllic resort on the nearby island of Nakanoshima, relocating the fishermen living there. In order to build an artificially constructed "paradise", he finances the construction by selling the Komoda family's industry to improve the island's infrastructure and appeases his business associate by giving him their kiln. Meanwhile, Genzaburo's widow, Chiyoko, whose late husband has been replaced by ill-intentioned Hitomi, learns about his deception after he has sex with her.

Near the completion of the resort island, Hitomi sends invitations to the island's villagers and escorts Chiyoko to the island on a tour. Upon the entrance to the island through an aquarium tunnel, he shows her extravagant manmade landscapes filled with entrancing music, complete with flowing waterfalls, luxurious grand palaces, enchanted pleasure garden, precious statues, frolicking attractive people romping on slopes carpeted with rainbow-colored flowers, and portions of the island made to look larger optically like a panorama. Having been entranced and overwhelmed by the island's optical illusion, Chiyoko unconsciously collapsed, and Hitomi choked and drowned her to death.

After the construction has been finished, Hitomi becomes a proprietor of his world, with the guests and employees enjoying staying at Panorama Island to live in fantastical leisure. However, sometime later, one of his servants receives a letter from a private detective named Kogoro Akechi, who has read "The Tale of RA" and visits the island to discover Hitomi's act. Hitomi, realizing his identity has been exposed after confessing his deception, leaves the island and commits suicide by launching himself into a firework, leaving the island pouring in a rain of blood.

== History ==
Japanese mystery and suspense author Edogawa Ranpo originally serialized his novella The Strange Tale of Panorama Island in the October 1926 issue of Shinseinen.

== Reception ==
The manga won the New Artist Prize at the 13th Tezuka Osamu Cultural Prize in 2009 and was nominated in 2014 for an Eisner Award for Best Adaptation from Another Medium.

== See also ==
- Fantasy Island, a 1977–1984 American television series with a similar plot
- The White Lotus, a 2021 American anthology television series with a similar theme
