= Lee Hyeon-sook =

South Korean manhwa artist (born 1971)

Lee Hyeon-sook (Korean: 이현숙; born December 29, 1971) is a South Korean manhwa artist who made her debut in 1992. Her works include Seduction More Beautiful Than Love, about a teacher and her student, and The Flower of Evil, a dark story about twins.

== Works ==
- Making Friends (1992)
- Ocean of Stars (1999)
- Really?! (2001)
- The Shadow of Moon (2001)
- Seduction More Beautiful Than Love (2004)
- Pure Love Stories (2006)
- The Flower of Evil (2006)
- Savage Garden (2009)
- Nobody Knows (2012)
- The Mean Boy (BL Webtoon) (CopinComics) (2014)
- The Beast Must Die (BL Webtoon) (Lezhin) (2017)
- I will be here for you (BL Webtoon) (Lezhin) (2022)
