= Faeries' Landing =

South Korean manhwa

- Cover of the Tokyopop edition of Faeries' Landing vol. 1 (2004), art by You Hyun

선녀강림 Seonnyeo gangnim
- Genre: Action/adventure, romantic fantasy
- Author: You Hyun (유현)
- Publisher: Daiwon C.I.
- English publisher: Madman Entertainment; Tokyopop
- Other publishers: Tokyopop Comics Factory
- Original run: 1998 – Present
- Volumes: 23

Faeries' Landing (Korean: 선녀 강림) is a 1998 Japanese style manhwa created by You Hyun and licensed in 2004 by Tokyopop. The original title is Seonnyeo Gangnim (선녀 강림). Seonnyeo refers to the Korean version of a female angel.

Set in modern-day South Korea with a strong element of fantasy, it follows the misadventures of 16-year-old Ryang Jegal (the Korean pronunciation of the Chinese historical figure, Zhūgě Liàng) which result when he meets the faerie Fanta, as well as his fate of having 108 doomed relationships. The plot also shares common elements with the classic Korean fairytale of the Fairy and the Woodcutter (also known as the story of Star Fisher in China and the Tennyo in Japan), both in Fanta and Ryang's story, but as well as the story of Fanta's parents, who were the basis of the legend. In the English version, the names of the characters and settings were changed dramatically. Korean version follows a traditional Korean folktale and settings while English version was altered to fit the world of faeries (resulting in Goodfellow and variety of characters). Translated character dialogs has been localized for North American audiences.

== Story ==
Ryang Jegal lives a relatively normal life; save whenever his teachers try to force him to remove his trademark bandana. When he saves a deer spirit called Goodfellow (Chunrok), Goodfellow offers him the opportunity to see something extraordinary. Since he has nothing better to do, Ryang accepts.

It turns out, Goodfellow's surprise is an enchanted spring where three beautiful faeries are bathing. Since he and Goodfellow cannot manage to stay undetected, Ryang accidentally tears the gown of one of the faeries. While Thea and Sina, the other two, can return to Avalon (the home of the faeries), the third cannot. The faerie Fanta decides that she will stay with Ryang until her gown heals. Fanta, despite the fact she cannot return home, is more than happy to stay on earth with Ryang.

Things seem to be going fine until Fanta's rival for the throne of Avalon and the king's affections, the faerie Medea, arrives on the scene. Determined to stir up some trouble, Medea anoints poor Ryang with magic eyedrops. If Ryang makes eye contact with a girl who already has romantic interest of any sort, an evil affinity will result. Ryang is destined to suffer 108 evil affinities and cannot control who he affects.

Since Fanta is the only one able to purify the evil affinities, it looks like Ryang will have to welcome her into his life. Little does he know, Fanta has her own reasons and problems for coming to earth in the first place...

== Characters ==
=== Main characters ===
Ryang Jegal (제갈량)
Ryang is the 16-year-old protagonist of Faeries' Landing. He lives with his oldest brother Hun Jegal and his wife, Taeyeong Oh. His parents are both working overseas, and his other brother Kang is currently serving out his mandatory Korean military term. (Kang does come back in the later volumes, and gets used by Ryang's psycho ex-girlfriend Yuri.) Ryang always wears a bandana to cover up a long scar that Yuri gave him on his forehead.

His best friend is Mungyeong Seong, who goes to school with him and Fanta. Ryang was held back a year because he missed too much school, for a reason that has not been disclosed yet, but he seems to be a decent student. He is fairly athletic as well, as he is an extremely fast runner and good skateboarder. It is said that Ryang has no problem attracting girls, something that would get him into trouble later on. As for Ryang himself, there are more and more hints that he is attracted to Fanta.

Fanta
The heroine of Faeries' Landing and the Faerie of Affinity. She is usually the only one who can purify Ryang's evil affinities, though her brother Pain and others with strong magical abilities can hold off the negative effects for an undisclosed amount of time. Until her gown heals itself (since a gown is a living part of a faerie), Fanta lives with Ryang's family on earth. Rather than being upset, she is quite happy to stay, mostly because it is the best opportunity to find her father's reincarnation and learn more about him. Ryang, Seho Yun, and Yuri Kim are the only humans who know that Fanta is a Faerie since Fanta has wiped the memories of everyone else who has seen her at work.

Though she looks sixteen, Fanta is actually 172 years old (since one Avalon year is about 10 earth years). She can be manipulative, especially since her innocent and sweet appearances allows others to trust her. Despite the handicap of being a half-faerie, Fanta is extremely powerful, and was even able to summon a master class gown in the middle of a magical battle against her rival Medea and the exiled god Neptune, despite the fact such a feat should have been impossible. Fanta likes life in the mortal realm so much she completely torn her dress in half to stay longer, which was why summoning a master class dress was such an impressive feat, considering how badly her regular dress was damaged. Beyond her impressive magical powers, Fanta is very agile and strong, something that comes in handy more than once while fighting evil affinities. Furthermore, her body possesses the unique quality of being to absorb, store, and then release vast amounts of magical energy. Because the power was dangerous, it was sealed off when Fanta was very young and she undid the seal only when Oreadia's life was threatened. This quality is shared by the King of Avalon and one of the primary reasons why he wants to marry her; since both he and Oreadia noticed this aspect of Fanta before it was sealed off, Fanta has become instrumental in both their plans.

Fanta's true main goal in life is to find her father and she will trust anyone who might say where he is, including her mother. However, even after a trip to the past to witness how her father and mother met, she finds that no one knows of her father's fate after Oran returned to Avalon with her two children and is left only with a rumour that he is possibly a prison in the Gwimun Mountains. Towards the end of volume 16, Fanta returns to Avalon with her mother under the impression that Oran will allow her to meet Sindo; in truth, Oran attempting to keep her daughter from interfering with her plans. However, Fanta really does see her father, whose only care in life is to be free from his imprisonment.

Seho Yun
One of Ryang's classmates. He learned early that Fanta is a faerie. When Fanta tried to wipe his memory it was uncovered that Seho has a multiple-personality disorder consisting of two distinct personalities, which possibly resulted when his twin brother died at birth. This condition prevents Fanta from wiping his memory or cutting his line of affinity. His personalities consist of a "geek" Seho with glasses, closed eyes and a quieter disposition and a "cool" Seho with no glasses, open eyes and a wilder personality. In the eleventh book, the "geek" Seho called himself Jun when meeting with Sorim (his girlfriend).

Zero and the "Spirit Squad of Five"
For a good deal of time, Ryang had to rely on Fanta to deal with evil affinities until they could be purified. This changed when Fanta's brother gave Ryang some strong magical abilities using his skateboard as a medium. So far, Ryang has used the skateboard to fly, and created a powerful energy blast by drawing on its power, even though it was nowhere near him. Five spirits can inhabit the skateboard, each representing one of the five elements (earth, fire, wood, water, and metal). Evidently, Ryang does not have to have the skateboard with him to access magical power, and is extremely likely he can do much more.

The de facto leader of the five is Zero, an earth spirit, and the first to inhabit the skateboard. As far as volume 10, only a spirit of metal is required to balance the current four. The other three spirits include Gabija (fire), Nyrckes (wood), and Neptune (water). Neptune, originally a sea god and initially not a true water elemental until Fanta enchanted him so he would be bound by the elemental cycle, does not appear to work with Zero, Nyrckes, and Gabija as often. None of the spirits are particularly fond of Ryang and rarely listen to his concerns, though are much more cooperative with Fanta.

Yuri Kim
A rich and revenge-minded teenage girl at the high school usually described as "psycho" and Ryang's ex-girlfriend. She is extremely beautiful and is popular among men, and also likes to dress up in unique styles. (Her hairstyle changes every time she shows up and she seems to possess an impressive wardrobe) Readers are shown Ryang's first date with Yuri Kim in vol 3, as told to Fanta by Mungyeong Seong. Yuri treated Ryang abusively, making it hard to believe that they ever had any more dates. However, in vol 16 readers are shown a bit of Ryang's memory of him dating Yuri. She is the one responsible for the long scar on his forehead, a parting "gift" when their relationship broke up.

She is obsessed with Ryang because he is the only man who ever got over her after their relationship ended. She is keen on getting him back, and is willing to do criminal deeds to satisfy her goal. She is resentful of Fanta and Fanta's relationship with Ryang, eventually taking advantage of Ryang's brother, Kang, in order to get to Ryang. She took in Bast, as a cat, after Bast lost one of her nine lives in vol 5. Since then Bast has shown Yuri Kim the existence of faeries and the two have worked together to take down Fanta. Yuri Kim employs two Japanese "body-guards", whom were birthday gifts from her father. She is currently being used as the host of the next evil force; when the force awakens, her life light will blow out.

Sindo
Pain and Fanta's father, who appears when Fanta uses a History Hex on Ryang to enter the past (volume 12). He is not attractive, but is good, honest, and compassionate. He lives as a woodcutter with his elderly mother in a modest shack in the middle of the forest. However, his kind heart and fear of heavy responsibility result in him giving his less honourable brother far too much leeway.

By chance, he saves Goodfellow, who offers as a reward to Sindo the opportunity to marry a beautiful faerie. Sindo initially takes up Goodfellow's offer and steals Oran's gown, but finds himself unable to do such a dishonourable task and tries to return the dress when Oran catches him. However, the interference of his brother prevents him from doing so; Sindo winds up taking care of and marrying Oran when she loses her memory and becomes attached to him. He adopts Pain as his own son; though he cares deeply about his family, he fears becoming too attached to them as he is aware his unearthly wife and her son may someday leave him.

However, when Seraphina and Sino switch the bodies of the brothers, Sindo is forced to take on the responsibilities as the provincial lord. He does the job well (to which Sino's aides are shocked and relieved with "Sino" finally working responsibly) and willingly gives up his own happiness with Oran until she attempts suicide. They are reunited briefly when he saves her, but in an ensuing fight with Sino, their bodies are restored and Oran regains her memories. In his final attempt to keep his family together before Oran returns to Avalon with their children, she offers him an ultimatum: he must kill his brother. Speculation hints that he is the human being kept at the Gwimun Mountains (Volume 8). Shindo's fate is further told in volume 19.

Sino
Sindo's half brother, on the side of their father; unlike his brother, Sino is handsome, but has questionable morals and is self-centered. He is lord of a province in ancient Korea, but is lecherous and selfish. Though Sindo was originally supposed to be the lord, he surrendered the position to Sino from fear of responsibility.

Sino is Pain's biological father, which resulted from raping Oran, and fathered Fanta when he switched bodies with Sindo. He is affectionate towards Fanta and Pain, who despite his prodigious abilities is unaware of the body switch. Oran, realizing that Sindo was not as he appeared, becomes erratic before her son and daughter and eventually leaves him and reunites with Sindo. After his and Sindo's bodies are restored, he returns to his libertine life as provincial lord. His ultimate fate is outlined in volume 19.

Yusin Min
The only girl/evil-affinity who continued to have tender feelings for Ryang after Fanta purified the affinity. Introduced in volume 6. Author You Hyun had intended Yusin to be a one-time character, but later decided to bring her back. Starting in volume 16, Yusin is the current damsel-in-distress and the current object of Yuri Kim's jealousy and hatred.

=== Other faeries/magical beings ===
Goodfellow (천록, Chunrok)
The messenger of the King of Avalon, as well as one of Heaven's Beasts, magical creatures that are half-animal, half-faerie in form. Goodfellow has the horns, ears, tail, and coloring of a deer, and can also turn into a real deer at will. Although he is nowhere near as skilled or powerful as Fanta in terms of magical power, he does have the ability to cast illusions, jump incredibly high, and ascend to Avalon. Whenever Goodfellow appears, trouble is sure to follow.

His greatest joy in life, however, is stealing bras and peeping at naked women, whether faerie or human in various states of undress, especially in the bath. He was also the one responsible for Ryang and Fanta's meeting. Ryang helped him escape the police, and he rewarded Ryang by taking him to the local bath house to peep at three faeries bathing.

Chunrok is a substitute for the deer in the original Korean folktale that was saved by the woodcutter.

Medea (미란다, Miranda)
Beautiful and ambitious, Medea's sole goal in life is to become Queen of Avalon by marrying the current king. Unfortunately for Medea, the only faerie he is interested in is her rival Fanta, whom he has preferred since her arrival and has promised to marry, even when Fanta refused him. Medea's petty rivalry is one-sided as Fanta often fails to notice Medea's attempts to better her. Medea is unintelligent and weak-minded, a fact many of the characters comment on, and she is much weaker than Fanta, who is only half-faerie compared to Medea. She is vain and proud, though the only good quality she has is her beauty. Unlike from her gifted brother, she scarcely has any magical powers. She greatly admires Fanta's mother Oran, a very skilled and powerful faerie.

Medea comes to earth with a plot to set up Fanta to kill or injure a human, which would forever bar Fanta from Avalon. She anoints Ryang with eye drops that will create up to 108 evil affinities with each girl he makes eye contact with, but her plan backfires when her gown is also torn by Ryang and she is miserably forced to stay on earth. For breaking the rules, the Prime Minister of Avalon (her brother Charon) exiles her, though the Chief Inspector (Fanta's brother Pain) offers parole if Medea helps Fanta deal with Ryang's evil affinities. Medea's recent plotting with rebels against the King of Avalon will probably end this deal. Though she and Charon do not seem to always get along, they care about each great deal; Charon comforted her when she failed an exam miserably, partly from the pressure of having a brilliant faerie like Charon as a brother and the Prime Minister as her father, while Medea becomes visibly upset when Charon mysteriously disappears and agrees to help Pain find her brother and investigate the King of Avalon.

Lady Oran/Oreadia (오란, Oran)
Fanta and Pain's mother, an extremely powerful faerie even after a liaison with a human man and the previous Faerie of Affinity. Oran was originally a candidate to be Queen of Avalon, but a jealous rival named Seraphina tricked her when the two of them went to earth to bathe. Oran was left on earth with a torn gown and married a human man after she was raped and lost her memory. Though having three children would have trapped her on earth forever, Oran got her gown back in a moment of desperation to stop Sindo (in Sino's body) from being killed by Sino (in Sindo's body).

Regaining her gown also brought back her memory and she was eventually found by the King and Syndra. Oran was allowed to return to Avalon, provided that she kill no humans, despite her hatred, and that Pain and Fanta must be taken back with her to heaven. Though Oran expresses a desire to rid herself of her children, she is unable to kill them because she had developed human compassion and found that, at some degree, she did love them. Bitter with her fall from the graces of the higher echelon, Oran took a new name, Oreadia, and grew to resent her children, who were a constant reminder of her relations with a human. She appears to have her own agenda concerning Fanta, who can drain her mother's own power when she is fully awakened as a faerie, in opposition to the King's own plan. In volume 18, it is revealed that she has taken revenge on faerie Seraphina, who is responsible for disgracing Oran, using Fanta's powers to absorb outer energy and change them into her own power. Oran cunningly implants fear and discomfort in Fanta towards Seraphina when Fanta is only a child, then persuades Seraphina to teach Fanta about faerie magic. During the lesson, Fanta feels threatened by Seraphina and she unconsciously attacks her, knocking her out. Oran steals the body of another faerie (Seraphina's best friend and minion, Melinda) and visits injured Seraphina. She casts a curse there that sends Seraphina to human world - she is to live perfectly ordinary human life until her fifteenth birthday, when all her memories as faeries come back to her. This is when she made a contract with Sanjae (King of Avalon) that if he overlooks this revenge and claims Oran not guilty of Seraphina's banishment, she will serve as a source of Fanta's powers - which means that every time Fanta unlocks the seal that prevents her from absorbing outer forces, all energy she draws will be drawn from Oran. In volume 19, Oran dies in front of Fanta as Fanta unknowingly unlocks her seal to help her mother.

Oreadia is the name that Lady Oran gives herself after returning to Avalon and believing herself unworthy of the title of "Lady". Her power is drained by Lady Samsin, which reduced her dress to a simpler and duller form and reveals her life can be blown out like a candle.

Pain (파인, Pa-in)
Fanta's older homosexual brother, and is a half-faerie like her. He shows extremely discriminative attitude towards all females except his sister, presumably because he had traumatic childhood relationship with his cold and distant mother. This also is implied to be the reason his romantic interests lie within males. He and his sister are close, even if they do argue sometimes like most siblings. Pain is the one who enchanted Ryang's skateboard (after hitting on him) so he could fight the evil affinities along with Fanta. Pain's best friend is Charon, the Prime Minister of Avalon and Medea's brother. Although the full extent of Pain's power is unknown, the fact that he has attained the position of Royal Inspector, a job which requires both power and precision, as well as being the only character seen so far that is able to hold off evil affinities. Like Fanta, he is much more powerful than the other inhabitants realize; as a child, he was able to detect Seraphina's spells when Charon and others could not. Pain also possesses powers to trace magical energy back to the original performer of magic.

Unlike Fanta, he can recall his father, but chooses not to tell Fanta of their father to protect her. It is revealed that Fanta's memories were erased once she arrived in Avalon, but Oran ensured that she and Pain would not. He and his mother do not get along and merely tolerate one another, though Oran admits to Fanta that she favors Pain over Fanta because her happiest memories in the human world were before Fanta was born, when Pain was growing up. While Pain strongly dislikes his mother-he refuses to call her 'mother', and it is he who gathered up evidence against Oran's crimes- he has some warm emotions towards her in truth. When Sangjae asks Pain to permit killing of Oran to save the faery world, Pain refuses.

Pain was most likely named after a popular Oran-C soft drink flavor, Pine-flavor.

The King (상제, Sang-jae)
He is the almighty ruler of Avalon. He is never referred to as anything but his Highness, the king, etc.. so it can be supposed that he doesn't have a name, just his royal title. The King has varying character traits; he can be annoying and comic at one moment then change to cunning and serious the next. He seems to have a pique interest in Fanta though it has not been fully disclosed as to what interests him so.

In the later volumes it shows him plotting to acquire a new body with Samsin; the Goddess of Birth in Avalon. Because the King must marry and reincarnate in the form of his son, his queen must be both powerful and beautiful, yet not ambitiously vying to become queen. The King originally had chosen Fanta's mother, Oran, but after her rival tricked her into marrying a human, Oran was no longer eligible. The King no longer wished to marry (since no faerie was as qualified as Oran) until he met Fanta, who he deemed worthy because she was of Oran's blood.

He has a youthful and somewhat 'girly' appearance (because of his long hair) which causes no end of teasing from Ryang when he visits earth in vol 5 to get the Scroll of Divination back from Bast. Now his only real concern is getting a new body, but Lady Samsin knows what he wants is impossible and should just get married. He is continuously losing his powers as an entire generation was delayed when Oran became incapable of marrying him. The king abducts Charon, who realized his plan to acquire a new body, and changes him into a form of a nine-tailed fox. He then holds a hunting competition for catching Charon in his fox form, then soon loses conscience as he has not married and reincarnated for too long.

Charon (천상, Chun-sang)
Medea's older brother and the Prime Minister of Avalon. He is fairly serious and is constantly frustrated by the King of Heaven always giving him the slip. Charon always does things by the book and is extremely perceptive, despite the fact that his king always manages to sneak away undetected until it is too late. Charon is deeply concerned with the King's recent activities, especially as the King still has not chosen a queen and worries the King may die before this occurs.

His recent investigations concerning the King's actions have had unfortunate consequences. Though he is rendered either apparently dead or unconscious by the King, Charon ended up taking the form of a nine-tailed fox and will be hunted by Samsin in order to further ease the King's plan with Samsin. When he is freed from the spell, he moves to confront the king.

Bast (묘향, Myo-hyang)
In the English version, Bast is a cat 'Goddess' who was rejected after rumor was spread that she was an evil monster. In the original, she is just a monsterish half-breed named Myohyang; discarded by family because of what she was. She plays a key role in the story as one of the main 'bad guys'. She teams up with Yuri (Ryang's psycho-ex) to plot to take down Fanta and Ryang, though she comments to Yuri at one point that she somewhat likes Fanta, but has to do what her 'mastuh' wants done. Her 'mastuh' is in fact Lady Oran/Oreadia.

When Ryang and Fanta time travel to the past they meet her as a 'kitten' and Fanta takes it upon herself to protect her because of Bast's cuteness and helplessness. Young Bast loves Sindo (Oran's husband), but dislikes his son Pain. The last we see of the early Bast is that Sindo has mindlessly slashed her with a knife Oran intended be used on Sindo's despicable brother Sino. It is unknown how she arrived in Avalon and entered Oreadia's service, though there may be a few clues, and deductions in the first chapters of vol. 15. Her memories have apparently been altered, given that she fails to recognize Sindo's name when Fanta asks her and tells Fanta that she has always served Oreadia.

Seraphina (예영, Yeyoung)
Once a devoted and bright faerie, she questioned the King as to why a faerie like herself was not permitted to visit him as often and freely as Oran. The King responds by saying that she and Oran are different by birth, and faery as lowly as Seraphina can not possibly compare herself with Oran. This left Seraphina jealous and determine to best Oran, no matter what it took, and constantly strove towards what ever goal Oran was headed to. She tricks Oran into staying on Earth by ordering Goodfellow to lead Sindo to the bathing spring, then altering the barrier that was supposed to hide them from humans so that Oran's gown was exposed for stealing. Seraphina uses the opportunity to achieve her ambitions and become the Queen of Avalon. Unfortunately, she is rejected again and again by the King, who constantly reminds Seraphina that no matter how hard she works, even after she becomes a first class faerie, she will never compare to Oran because Seraphina simply tries too hard to be something Oran comes by naturally. When Pain and Fanta arrive in Avalon, Seraphina appears again to eliminate Pain only to find that he is powerful enough to detect her spells with ease. Oreadia eventually masterminds Seraphina's downfall by using Fanta, Pain, and Syndra; Seraphina is punished for her attempt to get rid of Oreadia and reborn as a human on earth who would remember her heavenly origins only when she turned fifteen.

Syndra (수마, Soma)
One of Oran's companions, who was involved with the prank that left Oran stranded on Earth. In the end, Syndra is Oran's truest friend because she is the only one who never gave up on finding Oran and trying to help her return to Avalon. Syndra is allowed to descend to Earth at an inappropriate time (faeries can descend and ascend at the full moon) with the King to find Oran at the price of being forced to be reborn as a spirit force of gold and then confined for all eternity, as Gabija, Nyrckes, and Neptune once were.

Her sacrifice apparently will come into play as Oreadia initiates her unknown plan. Syndra is most likely the evil force to be awoken by nourishing on Yuri, as she is seen thinking about thanking her host for her revival.

Lady Samsin
The oldest faerie in Avalon and the Goddess of Birth. The King conspires with her in order to gain a new body, though little is known as to how the King intends to do so. She is extremely powerful and still appears beautiful, despite her age.
