= Maruo Station =

Railway station in Ube, Yamaguchi Prefecture, Japan

Maruo Station 丸尾駅
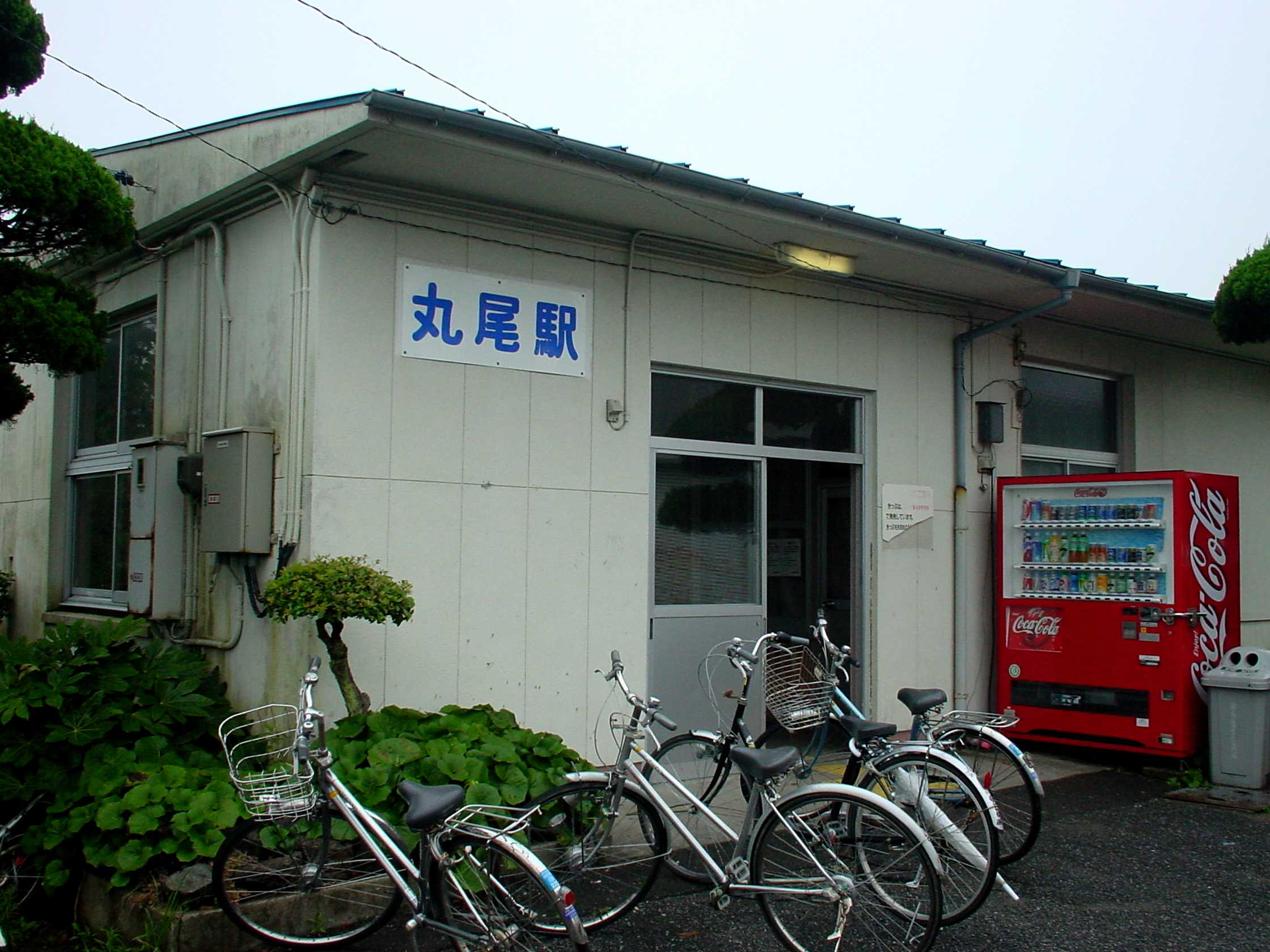
- Maruo Station in July 2006

General information
- Location: 5034 Kirinuki, Higashikiwa, Ube-shi, Yamaguchi-ken 755-0241; Japan
- Coordinates: 33°58′12.94″N 131°20′12.26″E
- Owner: West Japan Railway Company
- Operator: West Japan Railway Company
- Line: Ube Line
- Distance: 15.2 km (9.4 miles) from Shin-Yamaguchi
- Platforms: 1 island platform
- Tracks: 1
- Connections: Bus stop

Other information
- Status: Unstaffed
- Website: Official website

History
- Opened: 17 August 1924; 102 years ago

Passengers
- FY2020: 192

Services
Preceding station	JR West	Following station
Kiwa towards Shin-Yamaguchi	Ube Line Local	Tokonami towards Ube
Location
- Location within Yamaguchi Prefecture Location within Japan

Maruo Station (丸尾駅, Maruo-eki) is a passenger railway station located in the city of Ube, Yamaguchi Prefecture, Japan. It is operated by the West Japan Railway Company (JR West).

== Lines ==
Maruo Station is served by the JR West Ube Line, and is located 15.2 kilometers from the terminus of the line at Shin-Yamaguchi.

== Station layout ==
The station consists of one ground-level unnumbered island platform connected to the station building by a level crossing. Only one side of the platform is in use. The station is unattended.

== History ==
Maruo Station was opened on 17 August 1924 when the Ube Railway was extended from Hon-Ajisu Station (present-day Ajisu Station) to Tokonami. The line was nationalized in 1943, becoming the Ube Higashi Line, and was renamed the Ube Line on 1 February 1948. With the privatization of the Japan National Railway (JNR) on 1 April 1987, the station came under the aegis of the West Japan railway Company (JR West).

== Passenger statistics ==
In fiscal 2020, the station was used by an average of 192 passengers daily.

== Surrounding area ==
- Yamaguchi Prefectural Heart Medical Center
- Ube Industries Central Hospital
- Ube Municipal Higashikiwa Junior High School
- Ube Municipal Higashikiwa Elementary School

== See also ==
- List of railway stations in Japan
