= Legend of Lemnear =

Japanese original video animation (OVA)

- The Legend of Lemnear

極黒の翼バルキサス (Kyokkoku no Tsubasa Barukisasu)
- Genre: Sword and sorcery
- Original video animation
- Directed by: Kinji Yoshimoto
- Produced by: Hidenobu Ohyama
- Music by: Norimasa Yamanaka
- Studio: AIC
- Licensed by: US: Central Park Media
- Released: August 25, 1989
- Runtime: 45 minutes
- Manga
- Written by: Kinji Yoshimoto
- Illustrated by: Satoshi Urushihara
- Published by: Gakken
- English publisher: NA: CPM Manga
- Magazine: Comic Nora
- Original run: September 1991 – February 1993
- Volumes: 3

Legend of Lemnear (極黒の翼 バルキサス, Kyokkoku no Tsubasa Barukisasu; "Wings of Absolute Darkness: Valkysas") is an anime OVA directed by Kinji Yoshimoto with character designs by Satoshi Urushihara, produced by AIC. It was released on August 25, 1989, on video in Japan. The English subtitled version was released in 1995 and distributed by Central Park Media and U.S. Manga Corps.

The series had been adapted as a fantasy manga (レジェンド・オブ・レムネア, Rejendo obu Remunea) written by Kinji Yoshimoto with art by Satoshi Urushihara. It is licensed in North America by CPM Manga, in Poland by JPF and in Russia by Comics Factory. It focuses heavily on the "swords and sorcery" genre, and in typical Urushihara style provides a great deal of fan service.

The story focuses around the title character, Lemnear, who according to prophecy is the Champion of Silver. She seeks revenge on the evil wizard Gardein and the master he serves, attempting to avenge the slaughter of her people.

== Plot summary ==
Lemnear, a young warrior girl, arrives at a city ruled by the corrupt slaver Lord Vuan. She seeks revenge on the evil wizard Lord Gardein, Vuan's master, who slaughtered Lemnear's people when she was a child, in his search of a mysterious, prophesied, Champion of Silver. Eventually, Lemnear confronts Gardein, but she is knocked out by a magic blast and sent to the city's dungeons, where young girls are retained for Vuan's harem. There, an old mage tells Lemnear a prophecy: that the Champion of Silver will turn a Champion of Bronze into Gold, and destroy the evil dark lord Varohl, the ultimate mastermind behind Gardein and Vuan.

In order to rescue a friend from the dungeons, Lemnear infiltrates the harem, but Vuan brainwashes her into becoming another slave. Thanks to her magic choker, she breaks out, kills Vuan, and hears from Gardein that Varohl challenges her from his Castle of Valkysas. Upon reaching the castle, she learns of another survivor of her people, Mesh, whom Gardein had believed to be the Champion of Silver but who is actually the Champion of Bronze.

She fights and kills Gardein, but he turns out to be just the enchanted right arm of Varohl. The villain reveals that he is a Champion of Gold himself. He was raised up by dark powers, after his village kicked him out for being a human hybrid. Lemnear and Mesh fight him, defeating both his human and dragon form, but he then turns into a stone giant by possessing the castle and moves on to conquer the world. Realizing the prophecy, Lemnear awakes her power through her choker, turns Mesh into a Champion of Gold, and they together destroy Varohl's weak spot, killing him for good.

== Cast ==
=== Japanese ===
- Eiko Yamada - Lemnear
- Keiko Yokozawa - Lian
- Ryusei Nakao - Mesh
- Akio Ohtsuka - Vuan
- Iemasa Kayumi - Gardin
- Nobuo Tanaka - Barol
- Ryūji Saikachi - Sendoshi/Old Mage

=== English ===
- Jezabel Montero - Lemnear
- Veronica Taylor - Lian
- Greg Baglia - Mesh
- Bill Rogers - Vuan
- Bart Shattuck - Gardin
- Bill Rogers - Old Mage
- Harvey Shane - Barol
- Wendy Scharfman - Mother

== Reception ==
Similarities between Lemnear and the Taarakian Taarna from Heavy Metal, including her sword, hair color, and mode of transportation, were noted by critics.
