= Kinji Yoshimoto =

Japanese animator, writer, and director (1966–2021)

- よしもときんじ
- Born: 27 February 1966; Hiroshima Prefecture, Japan
- Died: 5 November 2021 (aged 55)
- Occupations: Animator; film director; television director; screenwriter; producer; manga artist
- Years active: 1985–2021
- Employers: Earthwork (1990–2005); Fortes (2002–2021)

Kinji Yoshimoto (よしもときんじ, Yoshimoto Kinji; 吉本 欣司) 27 February 1966 – 5 November 2021 was a Japanese animator, producer, writer and director. Some of his major works include Megazone 23 and Plastic Little. He also directed several of the Queen's Blade anime series, as well as anime adaptations for I Couldn't Become a Hero, So I Reluctantly Decided to Get a Job and Unbreakable Machine-Doll, and is known for his manga and anime productions with manga artist Satoshi Urushihara. The two along with Yoshihiro Kimura created their own production company called Earthwork. Yoshimoto died on 5 November 2021.

== Filmography ==
=== Anime ===
Year	Title	Crew role	Notes	Source
1985–1986	Megazone 23	Key animation	OVA series Part 1, 2	
1989	Legend of Lemnear	Director	OVA	
1994	Plastic Little	Key animation, Director, Screenplay		
2007	Genshiken Pt. 2	Director		
2009	Queen's Blade: The Exiled Virgin	Director, Screenplay, Series Composition		
2009	Queen's Blade 2: The Evil Eye	Story concept, Director		
2010–2011	Queen's Blade: Beautiful Warriors	Director	OVA	
2013	I Couldn't Become a Hero, So I Reluctantly Decided to Get a Job	Director		
2013	Unbreakable Machine-Doll	Director		
2013–2014	Vanquished Queens	Director, Composer	OVA	
2016	Queen's Blade Grimoire	Chief director	OVA	
2017	Seven Mortal Sins	Director		
2018	Joshi Ochi! 2-kai kara Onnanoko ga... Futte Kita!?	Director, Series Composition	ONA	(Note: Credited under the pseudonym of Jinki Tomoshiyo (ジンキトモシヨ).)
2019	Arifureta: From Commonplace to World's Strongest	Director, Series Composition		

=== Other projects ===
Year	Title	Crew role	Notes	Source
1996	Langrisser III	Opening Animation Staff (director)	Video game originally released for the Sega Saturn	
1998	Langrisser V: The End of Legend	Opening Animation Staff (director, key frame artist), Development Staff (visual artist)	Video game originally released for the Sega Saturn	
1999	Growlanser	Opening Animation Staff (director)	Video game originally released for the PlayStation	
2015	The Shisho (Master Teacher)	Animation Director	Combination live-action and anime	
