= Chirality (manga) =

Japanese manga series by Satoshi Urushihara

- Cover of the first volume of the Japanese re-release

キラリティー (Kiraritī)
- Genre: Romance, Science fiction, Yuri
- Manga
- Written by: Satoshi Urushihara
- Published by: Gakken
- English publisher: NA: CPM Manga
- Magazine: Comic NORA
- Original run: 1995 – 1997
- Volumes: 3 (Japanese re-release two volumes; initial CPM production 18 issues, re-released as four graphic novels)
- icon

Chirality (キラリティー, Kiraritī) is a four-volume yuri manga series written and illustrated by author Satoshi Urushihara. The manga was originally serialized in Comic NORA in 1995, and later published in three bound volumes, which was re-released into two bound volumes in 2003. In 1997 Chirality was licensed for released in North America by Central Park Media. It was originally published as 18 issues between March 1997 and August 1998, as well as being released into four bound volumes from 1997 to 2000. The art was also flipped so that it would read left to right, which was not an uncommon practice for manga released in the Western Hemisphere at the time.

== Plot ==
The story is set in a not too distant future, in which Earth has been overrun by a horrifying artificial virus. Mechanical parasites, mistakenly created in an attempt to advance technology, attach themselves to human spinal cords and turn their hosts into cyborgs, called GM. The Original GM were created by Gaia, a program designed by humans to regulate nature. Gaia malfunctioned and started creating their own GM. Currently, Gaia is repairing parts of it that were damaged, and once this is done, it will attempt to destroy the Earth.

Desperate to rid themselves of this technological terror, the remaining human survivors try to band together and learn to defend themselves against these android enemies.

Carol is an artificial being that was created specifically to save mankind. Unfortunately, in her youth she suffered greatly at the hands of the very humans she sought to save, and lost sight of her mission. Only through the kindness of one human girl named Shiori was Carol able to find her focus and a reason to save the world; for Shiori's sake.

The two reunite years later, as Carol saves Shiori from her friend Elena, who was tragically infected with the parasitic virus. Although Shiori doesn't remember Carol at first, Carol remembers Shiori and stops at nothing to protect her and express her love for her. Though Shiori is uncomfortable and embarrassed with Carol at first, she quickly grows to return her feelings. However, the two soon find out that their deep love isn't just a small matter between the two of them; it'll be a big factor in saving the entire world.

== Characters ==
Carol

An artificial being that was created specifically to save mankind. Unfortunately, in her youth, she suffered greatly at the hands of the very humans she sought to save and lost sight of her mission. Due to the kindness of Shiori, a human girl, she now stops at nothing to protect her and express her love for her. Author notes say Carol chose to have a "male mentality" in order to fall in love with Shiori.
Her abilities include immunity to GM infestation, assuming a male form -which provides her with additional strength during battle-, and creating animals from her own body. She was implanted with many kinds of animal DNA, meant to restore the animal population. Since Carol is able to absorb DNA through physical contact, she has been able to donate organs to injured humans with no chance of rejection, since they are their organs.

Shiori

A human girl who showed kindness towards Carol, and becomes the one thing that Carol strives to protect. She is very brave and compassionate, very close to her family and friends, and wholeheartedly wishes to end the GM threat with Carol and her family. While not trained in combat, she doesn't usually panic in the middle of a battle, and has some skill with firearms.

Big (Vic in some versions)

Carol's robot companion and auxiliary weapon against the GM. Maintains a sort of telepathic contact with her, which proves decisive in their mission to take down Gaia. Big possesses superhuman strength and has a veritable arsenal of weapons hidden in his body.

Adam

An android like Carol, but with male genes. He was intended to protect Carol, but Mother, a program building him, was destroyed. Being left incomplete, he was eventually revived by Gaia, therefore making his mission from protecting Carol to having to kill her.

Patty

A medic who accompanies the Gaia expedition and knows of Shiori and Carol's relationship.

Shizuma

Shiori's older brother who's oblivious to Shiori and Carol's relationship.
