= Suehiro Maruo =

Manga artist, illustrator and painter

- 丸尾 末広
- Born: January 28, 1956 (age 70); Nagasaki, Japan
- Occupations: Manga artist; illustrator; painter
- Writing career
- Period: 1980–

Suehiro Maruo (Japanese: 丸尾 末広, Hepburn: Maruo Suehiro; born January 28, 1956 in Nagasaki, Japan) is a Japanese manga artist, illustrator, and painter.

== Biography ==
Maruo graduated from junior high school in March 1967 but dropped out of senior high school. At the age of 15, he moved to Tokyo and began working for a bookbinder. At 17, he made his first manga submission to Weekly Shōnen Jump, but it was considered by the editors to be too graphic for the magazine's format and was subsequently rejected. Maruo temporarily removed himself from manga until November 1980 when he made his official debut as a manga artist in Ribon no Kishi (リボンの騎士) at the age of 24. It was at this stage that the young artist was finally able to pursue his artistic vision without such stringent restrictions over his work's visual content. Two years later, his first stand-alone anthology, Barairo no Kaibutsu (薔薇色の怪物; Rose Colored Monster) was published.

Maruo was a frequent contributor to the underground manga magazine Garo (ガロ).

Like many manga artists, Maruo sometimes makes cameo appearances in his own stories. When photographed, he seldom appears without his trademark sunglasses.

Although Maruo is primarily recognized for his work as a manga artist, he has also created illustrations for concert posters, CD jackets, magazines, novels, and other media. Additionally, some of his characters have been turned into figures.

Though relatively few of Maruo's manga have been published outside Japan, his work enjoys an international cult following.

His book Shōjo Tsubaki (aka Mr. Arashi's Amazing Freak Show) was adapted into an animated film (Midori) by Hiroshi Harada with a soundtrack by J.A. Seazer. The film premiered in 1992 at a Shinto shrine in a replica of the "Red Cat" theater where the film takes place. The film became known for its elaborate gimmick screenings which included having the audience traverse through a labyrinth with freak show theming to enter the theater, live performers and live effects during key moments of the film. Harada did not allow the film to be released on home media for years, though he eventually allowed a company called Ciné Malta to release the film on DVD in France in 2006 under the name Midori. The film received a resurgence in interest on the Internet during the 2010s due to a false urban legend that the film was banned everywhere.

American composer John Zorn used Suehiro illustrations for the liner art of his band Naked City's albums. Zorn has contributed the foreword to Suehiro's collection of works (published in 2005).

== Style ==
Maruo's nightmarish manga fall into the Japanese category of "erotic grotesque" (エログロ; "ero-guro"). The stories often take place in the early years of Showa Era Japan. Maruo also has a fascination with human oddities, deformities, birth defects, and "circus freaks". Many such characters figure prominently in his stories and are sometimes the primary subjects of his illustrations. Maruo also adapted to manga stories by Edogawa Ranpo, such as "The Strange Tale of Panorama Island" and "The Caterpillar". An English translation of The Strange Tale of Panorama Island was published by Last Gasp in July 2013.

The illustrations throughout several of his works show grotesquely dark imagery, strange sexual acts / rituals, as well as sexual-violence towards minors. It is referred to as contemporary "bloody prints" muzan-e (a subset of Japanese ukiyo-e depicting violence or other atrocities.) Maruo himself featured in a 1988 book on the subject with fellow artist Kazuichi Hanawa entitled Bloody Ukiyo-e (江戸昭和競作無惨絵英名二十八衆句), presenting their own contemporary works alongside the traditional prints of Yoshitoshi and Yoshiiku.

== Bibliography ==
- 薔薇色ノ怪物 (Barairo no Kaibutsu)
  - 1982, July 25 – Seirindo
  - 1992 – Seirindo ISBN 4-7926-0105-3
  - 2000, February 25 – Seirindo ISBN 4-7926-0310-2 (new edition)
- 夢のQ-SAKU (Yume no Q-SAKU)
  - 1982, December 25 – Seirindo ISBN 4-7926-0110-X
  - 2000, April 14 – Seirindo ISBN 4-7926-0311-0 (new edition)
- DDT
  - 1983, November 25 – Seirindo ISBN 4-7926-0122-3
  - 1999, January 25 – 青林工藝舎 ISBN 4-88379-020-7 (new edition)
- 少女椿 (Shōjo Tsubaki)
  - 1984, September 25 – Seirindo ISBN 4-7926-0129-0
  - 1999, August 25 – Seirindo ISBN 4-7926-0306-4 (revised edition)
  - 2003, October 24 – 青林工藝舎 ISBN 4-88379-141-6 (2003 revised edition)
- キンランドンス (Kinrandonsu)
  - 1985, September 1 – Seirindo ISBN 4-7926-0143-6
  - 2000, June 20 – Seirindo ISBN 4-7926-0319-6 (new edition)
- 丸尾末広ONLY YOU (maruo suehiro ONLY YOU)
  - 1985, December 25
- パラノイア・スター (Paranoia Star)
  - 1986, January 31
  - 1994, September 25 – 秋田書店 ISBN 4-253-10379-0
- 江戸昭和競作無惨絵英名二十八衆句 (Edo Shōwa Kyōsaku Muzan-e Eimei Nijūhasshūku (Bloody Ukiyo-e in 1866 & 1988))
  - 1988, January 20
- 丸尾地獄 (Maruo Jigoku)
  - 1983, November 25
  - 2001, October 2
- 国立少年 (ナショナルキッド) (Kokuritsu Shōnen (National Kid))
  - 1989, August 1 – Seirindo ISBN 4-7926-0191-6
- 犬神博士 (Inugami Hakase)
  - serialized in Young Champion
  - 1994, September 25
- 風の魔転郎 (Kaze no Matenrō)
  - 1995, April 25 – 徳間書店 ISBN 4-19-950011-1
- 丸尾地獄2 (Maruo Jigoku 2)
  - 1995 – Seirindo
  - 2001 December 12 – Seirindo
- 丸尾画報1 (MARUOGRAPH1) (Maruo Gahō 1)
  - 1996, September 1 – トレヴィル
- 丸尾画報2 (MARUOGRAPH2) (Maruo Gahō 2)
  - 1996, November 1 – トレヴィル
- ギチギチくん (Gichigichi-kun)
  - serialized in Young Champion
  - 1996, December 1 – 秋田書店 ISBN 4-253-10318-9
- 月的愛人LUNATIC LOVER'S
  - 1997, February 25 – Seirindo
  - 1999, December 20 – Seirindo
- マルヲグラフ (Maruograph)
  - 1999, March 1 – パロマ舎
- 新ナショナルキッド (NEW NATIONAL KID) (Shin National Kid)
  - 1999, November 25 – 青林工藝舎 ISBN 4-88379-044-4
- 笑う吸血鬼 (Warau Kyūketsuki (Laughing Vampire))
  - 1998-1999 - serialized in Young Champion
  - 2000, March 15 – 秋田書店 ISBN 4-253-10310-3
- マルヲボックス 特装版 (Maruo Box)
  - 2000, August 1 – パロマ舎 (limited edition of 50)
- マルヲボックス 普及版 (Maruo Box)
  - 2000, August 1 – パロマ舎 (limited edition of 100)
- 新世紀SM画報 (Shinseiki SM Gahō)
  - 2000, August 20 – 朝日ソノラマ
- ハライソ 笑う吸血鬼2 (Paraiso: Warau Kyūketsuki 2)
  - 2003 - serialized in Young Champion
  - 2004 – 秋田書店 ISBN 4-253-10311-1
- 丸尾画報EX1 (MARUOGRAPH EX 1) (Maruo Gahō EX 1)
  - 2005, June 11 – Editions Treville Pan-Exotica ISBN 4-309-90640-0 (new expanded edition of 丸尾画報1)
- 丸尾画報EX2 (MARUOGRAPH EX 2) (Maruo Gahō EX 2)
  - 2005, August 11 – Editions Treville Pan-Exotica ISBN 4-309-90641-9 (new expanded edition of 丸尾画報2)
- The Strange Tale of Panorama Island (パノラマ島綺譚, Panorama-tō Kidan)
  - 2008, February 25 – Enterbrain ISBN 4-7577-3969-9 (adaptation of a Edogawa Rampo story)
- The Inferno in Bottles (瓶詰の地獄)

== Translations ==
Year	Title	Publisher	ISBN	Notes
1992	How to Take a Japanese Bath	Stone Bridge Press	978-0962813795	Written by Leonard Koren with illustrations by Maruo.
1993	How To Rake Leaves	Stone Bridge Press	978-1880656075	Written by Leonard Koren with illustrations by Maruo.
1993	Shōjo Tsubaki	Blast Books	978-0922233069	English title "Mr. Arashi's Amazing Freak Show " Originally published in Japanese in 1983-94. English translation by Yoko Umezawa & Laura Lindgren
1996	Comics Underground Japan	Blast Books	978-0922233168	English translation by Kevin Quigley.
2001	Ultra-Gash Inferno	Creation Books	978-1840680393	Anthology including Maruo's story "Planet of the Jap". English translation by James Havoc.
2013	The Strange Tale of Panorama Island	Last Gasp	978-0867197778	English translation by Ryan Sands. Second printing released May 15, 2025.
2025	Beautiful Monster	Bubbles Fanzine	978-1737826439	English translation by Ryan Holmberg.
2026	Lunatic Lover’s	Bubbles Fanzine	978-1737826453	English translation by Ryan Holmberg.

== Figures and toys ==
- 人間豹と少年探偵 (ningenhyō to shōnen tantei) The Leopard-man and the Young Detectives produced by Eastpress (イーストプレス) of Japan
- 少女椿 (shōjo midori) Young Girl Midori 18 cm figure produced by Artstorm (アート・ストーム) of Japan

== Sources ==
- Ing, Eric van den & Schaap, Robert (1992). Beauty and Violence. ISBN 90-70216-04-3.
