= Plastic Little =

Japanese anime and manga series by Satoshi Urushihara

- The cover of the Plastic Little DVD.

プラスチックリトル (Purasuchikku Ritoru)
- Genre: Science fiction
- Created by: Kinji Yoshimoto; Satoshi Urushihara
- Original video animation

Plastic Little: The Adventures of Captain Tita
- Directed by: Kinji Yoshimoto
- Produced by: Kazuhiko Ikeguchi; Hideaki Fujii
- Written by: Mayori Sekijima
- Music by: Tamiya Terashima
- Studio: Pierrot
- Licensed by: NA: ADV Films
- Released: 21 March 1994
- Runtime: 47 minutes
- Manga

Plastic Little: Captain's Log
- Written by: Kinji Yoshimoto
- Illustrated by: Satoshi Urushihara
- Published by: Gakken
- English publisher: NA: CPM Manga
- Magazine: Comic Nora
- Published: May 1994
- icon

Plastic Little (プラスチックリトル, Purasuchikku Ritoru) is a Japanese original video animation film and a manga series created by Satoshi Urushihara. It was released in North America on VHS by ADV Films in July 1994. It was released on DVD in February 2002. Along with Burn-Up Excess, it is one of two ADV titles to include the trademarked "Jiggle Counter".

== Plot summary ==
The main character of Plastic Little is Tita Mu Koshigaya, a young woman who captains a ship, the Cha-Cha Maru, whose business is capturing exotic creatures in the 'sea of clouds' of the planet Ietta, apparently a gas giant of some kind, and selling them to collectors and zoos. By chance, she saves Elysse Aldo Mordish, a young woman of her own age, from a rogue faction of Ietta's own military forces, led by the armored commander Guizel, who already killed Elysse's scientist father. As the military conducts a vicious chase for Elysse, it becomes apparent that she holds the key to a secret that could determine the fate of the entire planet's independence.

Although the anime's overriding goal is of course that of saving the world, an almost equal amount of time is spent on character interaction. Much of Tita's crew once served under her father, and Tita has inherited much of the respect and devotion that he earned from them. Tita and Elysse's relationship is the focus of much screen time; Tita risks life and limb for Elysse seemingly on a whim, later explaining that she felt it was impossible to stand by and watch her capture. In a small heartfelt speech delivered during a sunrise breakfast, Elysse speaks of feelings for Tita that could be interpreted as being "like love at first sight". Tita has also shown some fondness for Nichol Hawking, a somewhat bumbling young man on her crew who has a long-term crush on her. Tita's feelings for Nichol are shown in much less detail, restrained to a small, chaste kiss on his forehead after Nichol has fallen asleep beside her sickbed. Tita never makes romantic feelings clear for either of the possible love interests.

In a short miniseries of comics that followed the OVA, this tendency to use action and adventure mostly as a vehicle for character interaction continues. Elysse and Tita are not together physically, but apparently keep in very regular communication via videophone. (For which communications, Tita does not seem particularly inclined to wear clothes.) Other issues see Tita searching the Cloud Sea in the vain hope her father might somehow still be alive, and helping Nichol to win a race he has been attempting for years. Much is made of a family dynamic among the crew, with Balboa an obvious father figure for Tita, Mei as mother, and Mikhail as gruff grandfather.

== Characters ==
Titaniva Mu Koshigaya
Voiced by: Yuriko Fuchizaki (Japanese); Amanda Winn-Lee (English)
The chief heroine of Plastic Little, Titaniva Mu Koshigaya (or Tita to her friends) is the captain of the Cha-Cha Maru, a pet shop hunter ship she inherited from her father, Gentaro Koshigaya. A tomboy at heart, whenever she gets time away from the gas ocean, Tita often enjoys riding on her jetcycle. However, Tita would prefer to cruise the gas ocean. Although it is apparent her father is dead, Tita still believes that a part of Gentaro still lives or that he may be still alive.
In the manga version of Plastic Little, it is further known that Tita also has the ability to sense weather patterns at least a day ahead of time. She can even know if a storm is due just because of the air currents.
Elysse Aldo Mordish
Voiced by: Hekiru Shiina (Japanese); Tiffany Grant (English)
The target of Lord Guizel's search, Elysse Aldo Mordish had escaped the gravity belt complex with the aid (and ultimate sacrifice) of her father, Nalderof Aldo Mordish. Her last twelve digits of her D.N.A. sequence, decoded using the BRG method, is the code to unleashing the Gravity Destruction Ray, a potent weapon created from one of the gravity belts which could destroy the island colony.
When she was first rescued by Tita, she was more than a little bashful, even when Tita invited her to the Cha-Cha Maru's bathhouse (and VERY embarrassed when Tita accidentally fondled her when she helped her undress for that bath). However, as time went on, she began to trust her. However, in the end, Ellyse decided to go back to the colony to continue her father's work.
Joshua L. Balboa
Voiced by: Norio Wakamoto (Japanese); Aaron Krohn (English)
Joshua L. Balboa (called "Balboa" for short) serves on the Cha-Cha Maru as a sailor. In the manga, he is revealed to be a former high-ranking army commander by the name of Andy Furlong, who disappeared following a failed assassination attempt against "Cloud Killer Whale", the boss of the North Colony Mafia, and the supposed death of his partner, Jeff Griess, and was subsequently taken in by Tita's father. 12 years later, however, Griess resurfaced as a cyborg, forced into service by the Mafia until he learned that Andy/Balboa was still alive, and enlisted his help in taking down "Cloud Killer Whale" once and for all. In the end, Balboa shot Griess to grant him a merciful demise after the latter's cyborg life systems were critically damaged. Due to his military training, Balboa is a skilled pilot and combatant.
Mei Lin Jones
Voiced by: Keiko Yokozawa (Japanese); Marcy Rae (English)
Medical officer on board the Cha-Cha Maru, Mei Lin Jones is charged with the health of the crew. The medical talents of this stunning beauty is tested to the limit, especially when Tita is gravely injured at the hands of Guizel.
In the manga, Mei is depicted as a sister figure to Tita; Tita was raised as part of Mei's family after her father died. It is also revealed that Mei once saved Tita's life when Tita was suffering from a deadly disease called 'Ietta Fever'. She is also a skilled martial artist.
Mikhail Diagilev
Voiced by: Chikao Ōtsuka (Japanese); Tristan MacAvery (English)
The chief engineer of the Cha-Cha Maru, Mikhail Diagilev might be the most loyal supporter of Tita on board. His service goes back to Tita's father the previous owner of the Cha-Cha Maru. He still bears guilt of allowing Tita's father to die when he jettisoned the engineering section eleven years prior and would die rather than seeing Tita die as well.
Nichol Hawking
Voiced by: Kappei Yamaguchi (Japanese); Spike Spencer (English)
Nichol Hawking, the Cha-Cha Maru's chief pilot, has a big crush on Tita. Once he, with a little help from Roger Rogers, spied on Tita as she and Ellyse bathed (and suffered a nosebleed as a result). Tita, however, got even with the both of them. When Tita was injured by Guizel, Nichol stayed at her bedside while she healed.
Nichol is an expert pilot. Although he tends to panic, he knows enough to keep a level head in a crisis situation, especially when Tita leads the Cha-Cha Maru against the rogue fleet of Guizel. In the manga, he is shown to be a natural favorite at a dangerous racing event, which he eventually wins with Tita acting as his navigator.
Roger Rogers
Voiced by: Ryusei Nakao (Japanese); Doug Smith (English)
Roger is an Afro-American serving as assistant engineer aboard the Cha-Cha Maru. While highly dependable in a crisis situation, in everyday life Roger demonstrates few redeeming qualities: He is a peeping tom who likes to spy on Tita and Mei Lin while they are in the bath; a glutton who regularly depletes the ship's food supplies; and he keeps tempting Nichol with dirty stories about Tita. In the manga, his background story and age are listed as "Unknown".
